= 1958 Memorial Cup =

Canadian junior ice hockey championship

The Memorial Cup trophy

The 1958 Memorial Cup final was the 40th junior ice hockey championship of the Canadian Amateur Hockey Association. The George Richardson Memorial Trophy champions Ottawa-Hull Junior Canadiens an independent team in Eastern Canada competed against the Abbott Cup champions Regina Pats of the Saskatchewan Junior Hockey League in Western Canada. In a best-of-seven series, held at the Ottawa Auditorium in Ottawa, Ontario and at Hull Arena in Hull, Quebec, Ottawa-Hull won their 1st Memorial Cup, defeating Regina 4 games to 2.

== Scores ==
- Game 1: Regina 4-3 Ottawa-Hull
- Game 2: Ottawa-Hull 4-2 Regina
- Game 3: Ottawa-Hull 6-2 Regina
- Game 4: Regina 4-3 Ottawa-Hull (OT)
- Game 5: Ottawa-Hull 6-3 Regina
- Game 6: Ottawa-Hull 6-1 Regina

== Winning roster ==
Jon Annable, Ralph Backstrom, Jacques Begin, Bob Boucher, Bill Carter, Claude Cyr, Dick Dawson, Claude Fournel, Bruce Gamble, Terry Gray, John Longarini, Nick Murray, Bob Olajos, Claude Richard, Bobby Rousseau, Claude Ruel, Andre Tardif, Gilles Tremblay, J. C. Tremblay, Harold White. Coach: Scotty Bowman
