= Montreal Junior Canadiens =

Canadian junior ice hockey team (1933–1972)

- City: Montreal, Quebec
- League: Junior Amateur Hockey Association (1933–1949); Quebec Junior Hockey League (1949–1955); Independent (1955–1958); Eastern Ontario Senior Hockey League (1958–59); Metropolitan Junior Hockey League (1959–60); Senior Interprovincial Hockey League (1960–61); Ontario Hockey Association (1961–1972)
- Operated: 1933–1972
- Home arena: Montreal Forum
- Colours: Red, white and blue
- Parent clubs: Montreal Canadiens (1933–1967)

Franchise history
- 1933–1956: Montreal Junior Canadiens
- 1956–1959: Ottawa-Hull Canadiens
- 1959–1960: Brockville Canadiens
- 1960–1961: Hull Canadiens
- 1961–1972: Montreal Junior Canadiens
- 1972–1975: Montreal Bleu Blanc Rouge
- 1975–1982: Montreal Juniors
- 1982–1984: Verdun Juniors
- 1984–1989: Verdun Junior Canadiens
- 1989–1996: Saint-Hyacinthe Laser
- 1996-present: Rouyn-Noranda Huskies

Championships
- Playoff championships: 1950, 1958, 1969, & 1970 Memorial Cup Champions

The Montreal Junior Canadiens were a Canadian junior ice hockey team from 1933 to 1972, and a farm team to the Montreal Canadiens. They were mostly based in Montreal and played home games at the Montreal Forum, except for a five-year span in Ottawa, Hull, Quebec, and Brockville, Ontario. The Junior Canadiens were national champions four times, winning the Memorial Cup in 1950, 1958, 1969, and 1970.

The Junior Canadiens played in the Junior Amateur Hockey Association (1933–1949), the Quebec Junior Hockey League (1949–1955), then were an independent team without a league from 1955 to 1958. They later played in the Eastern Ontario Senior Hockey League (1958–59), the Metropolitan Junior Hockey League (1959–60), the Senior Interprovincial Hockey League (1960–61), then finally in the Ontario Hockey Association from 1961 to 1972.

== History ==
=== Early years in Quebec ===
The Junior Canadiens played home games at the Montreal Forum, and were a farm team to the Montreal Canadiens of the National Hockey League.

In the 1949–50 season, the Junior Canadiens defeated the Quebec Citadelles in the playoffs, then won a series versus Halifax St. Mary's when they surrendered following losses of 11–3 and 10–1 at Montreal. After that the Junior Canadiens defeated the Guelph Biltmores to represent eastern Canada in the Memorial Cup. The 1950 Memorial Cup featured two farm teams of the Montreal Canadiens. The Junior Canadiens defeated the Regina Pats in a best-of-seven game series by 4 games to 1, winning on home ice at the Forum.

Coach and manager Sam Pollock signed Ron Attwell in 1953, despite the player's transfer from the Ontario Hockey Association (OHA) not being approved by the Canadian Amateur Hockey Association (CAHA). Subsequently, the Quebec Amateur Hockey Association (QAHA) was suspended by the CAHA, rendering Quebec Junior Hockey League (QJHL) teams ineligible for the Memorial Cup playoffs. In game three of the 1953 QJHL finals versus the Quebec Citadelles, Montreal scored the winning goal with eight second remaining. The game ended in a brawl involving players, spectators, and Quebec's coach Phil Watson. Quebec led the series two games to one at the time. Instead of resuming the best-of-nine series, the Citadelles withdrew from the QAHA, and were reinstated for the 1953 Memorial Cup playoffs. With the playoffs now abandoned, the Junior Canadiens arranged charity exhibition game versus a team of all-stars led by Frank Eddolls. Montreal won the game by a 3–2 score, then planned a series versus the QAHA senior ice hockey champions, the St-Joseph d'Alma Eagles. The proposed series was called off due to differences on financial guarantees for the travelling team.

=== Moving to Ottawa, Hull, and Brockville ===
When the QJHL disbanded in 1955, the Canadiens played exhibition games and competed in the Laurier Cup versus the OHA. The Canadiens won the Laurier Cup in 1956, and entered the Memorial Cup playoffs as an independent team, but lost in the Eastern Canada finals to the OHA's Toronto Marlboros 4-games-to-3 with 1 tie.

Becoming the Ottawa-Hull Canadiens in 1956, they played exhibition games against the OHA, the Quebec Hockey League, and the OHA Senior A League. In the 1957 season with the minor professional Quebec Hockey League, Ottawa had a record of 7 wins, 12 losses, and a tie, with 57 goals for and 74 goals against. In the junior A Eastern Canada semifinal, the Canadiens defeated the Ottawa Shamrocks in two consecutive games. Ottawa-Hull then won the Eastern Canada final by defeating the Guelph Biltmores in six games. The Canadiens lost the 1957 Memorial Cup in seven games to the Flin Flon Bombers.

In 1958, the team was known as the Hull-Ottawa Junior Canadiens. Hull-Ottawa won the Eastern Canada semifinal in two games versus the Cape Breton All-Stars, and won the Eastern Canada final in five games versus the Toronto Marlboros. The Canadiens won the 1958 Memorial Cup by defeating the Regina Pats in five games, who were also a farm team of the Montreal Canadiens.

Playing in the Eastern Ontario Senior Hockey League for the 1958–59 season, the Canadiens had a mixed roster of junior and senior ice hockey players. The Canadiens finished third in the league, and lost the playoffs semifinal to the Kingston Merchants 4-games-to-3 with 1 tie. The junior portion of the roster moved onto the 1959 Memorial Cup playiffs, losing in the Eastern Canada final to Peterborough Petes. In 1959, the Eastern Professional Hockey League formed the Hull-Ottawa Canadiens, another Montreal farm team. The Junior Canadiens moved, becoming the Brockville Canadiens in the Metropolitan Junior Hockey League. The Canadiens dominated their new league with a 25-1-0 record. The Canadiens became 1960 Quebec Junior Champions by defeating the Alma Aiglons 11-1 and 10-0, when Alma conceded the third game. In the Richardson Trophy final, they faced the OHA's St. Catharines Teepees. The Teepees won the first three games of the series, but the Canadiens tied the series at 3-games-to-3 with 1 tie. The Teepees won the eighth game 6-3 to clinch the series.

Becoming the Hull Canadiens for the 1960–61 season, they joined the Interprovincial Senior Hockey League despite having a roster of junior players. They were 1960-61 regular season champions, losing only twice. The 1960–61 playoffs, the Canadiens defeated the Smiths Falls Rideaus in four consecutive games in the semifinal, and won the league championship three-games-to-one versus Ottawa St. Anthony's. In the 1961 Allan Cup Eastern Canada quarterfinal, the Canadiens lost in three consecutive games to the Granby Victorias.

=== Ontario Hockey Association ===
In 1961, the Ontario Hockey Association (OHA) junior A division was reduced to five teams, when several teams departed to form the Metro Junior A League. OHA president Lloyd Pollock applied to the Canadian Amateur Hockey Association (CAHA) to permit the Canadiens to switch from the Quebec Amateur Hockey Association to play in the OHA as its sixth team. The request was denied by CAHA president Jack Roxburgh, who stated that CAHA rules do not allow en masse transfers between provincial associations. The proposal was later approved in September 1961, when the CAHA branch presidents voted in favour of the Junior Canadiens playing in the 1961–62 OHA season.

The Junior Canadiens defeated the St. Catharines Black Hawks for the 1969 OHA championship, then defeated the Sorel Black Hawks in four games for the Richardson Cup. The Montreal roster in the 1968–69 OHA season included 13 rookies. The 1969 Memorial Cup was a rematch of 19 years earlier with the Regina Pats. The Canadiens picked up netminder Jim Rutherford from the Hamilton Red Wings for the national championship. The first two games were scheduled for the Montreal Forum, with the remainder of the games to be played at Regina Exhibition Stadium. The Junior Canadiens won the series in four consecutive games. The team included multiple future NHL stars and all-stars: Gilbert Perreault, Rick Martin, Marc Tardif, Rejean Houle, Ian Turnbull, Andre Dupont, Guy Charron, J.P. Bordeleau, Bobby Lalonde and Jocelyn Guevremont.

The Junior Canadiens finished first place in the 1969–70 OHA season, then defeated the Ottawa 67's and St. Catharines Black Hawks in the first two playoffs rounds. In the J. Ross Robertson Cup final versus the Toronto Marlboros, the Junior Canadiens won four games to three. Playing the Northern Ontario Hockey Association (NOHA) champion Sault Ste. Marie Greyhounds, Montreal won the first game 6–2, then Sault Ste. Marie won game two 5–4. It was the first time that a NOHA team won a game from an OHA team in the playoffs. Montreal won the next three games by 10–1, 9–2 and 20–1 scores. For the Richardson Cup, the Junior Canadiens played the Quebec Junior Hockey League champions Quebec Remparts featuring Guy Lafleur. Montreal prevailed in three consecutive games playing in front of crowds exceeding 14,000 in Quebec City, and 18,000 in Montreal. Montreal's opponents for the 1970 Memorial Cup were the Weyburn Red Wings of the Saskatchewan Junior Hockey League, coached by Stan Dunn. The Junior Canadiens won in four consecutive games, with the decisive game on home ice at the Forum.

=== Move to the QMJHL ===
The Junior Canadiens had been allowed to play in the OHA by an agreement with the Quebec Amateur Hockey Association (QAHA) and the Canadian Amateur Hockey Association. The Junior Canadiens were accused by the newly formed Quebec Major Junior Hockey League (QMJHL) of poaching talent in the province.The QAHA pressured Junior Canadiens ownership to join the QMJHL. The Junior Canadiens suspended operations in the OHA for one year, and were purchased by the Entreprises Sportif de Montreal group which moved the team to the QMHJHL for the 1972–73 season. The team was renamed Montreal Bleu Blanc Rouge and continued play at the Montreal Forum.

== Coaches ==
Sam Pollock and Billy Reay coached the 1950 Memorial Cup champions Junior Canadiens. Elmer Lach coached the 1954–55 squad. Lou Passador coached the team during the 1955–56 season.

Claude Ruel coached the team its first two seasons in the OHA. Former goaltender Yves Nadon piloted the team to its first OHA finals in 1964. Scotty Bowman coached the Junior Canadiens in the 1964–65 and 1965–66 seasons. Leo Bossy coached the 1966–67 season. Roger Bedard coached the team from 1967 to 1970, including successive Memorial Cups in 1969 and 1970.

== Players ==
=== OHA award recipients ===
Season	Player	Award(s)	Recognition	Source
1961–62	André Boudrias	Eddie Powers Memorial Trophy	Top point scorer	
1961–62	George Holmes	Dave Pinkney Trophy	Lowest team goals against average	
1963–64	André Boudrias	Eddie Powers Memorial Trophy	Top point scorer	
1963–64	Yvan Cournoyer	Red Tilson Trophy	Most valuable player	
1965–66	Ted Ouimet	Dave Pinkney Trophy	Lowest team goals against average	
1968–69	Réjean Houle	Eddie Powers Memorial Trophy	Top point scorer	
1968–69	Réjean Houle	Red Tilson Trophy	Most valuable player	
1968–69	Réjean Houle	Max Kaminsky Trophy	Most sportsmanlike player	
1968–69	Wayne Wood and Ted Tucker	Dave Pinkney Trophy	Lowest team goals against average	
1969–70	Gilbert Perreault	Red Tilson Trophy	Most valuable player	
1970–71	Jocelyn Guevremont	Max Kaminsky Trophy	Most outstanding defenceman	

=== Hall of Fame alumni ===
List of Junior Canadiens' alumni inducted into the Hockey Hall of Fame:

- Scotty Bowman
- Émile Bouchard
- Yvan Cournoyer
- Jacques Laperrière
- Guy Lapointe
- Jacques Lemaire
- Dickie Moore
- Craig Patrick
- Gilbert Perreault
- Jacques Plante
- Henri Richard
- Serge Savard

=== Notable alumni ===
Notable Junior Canadiens who played in the National Hockey League or World Hockey Association:

Junior Amateur Hockey Association (1933–1949) and Quebec Junior Hockey League (1949–1955)

- Ron Attwell
- Ralph Backstrom
- Émile Bouchard
- Claude Bourque
- Tom Brennan
- Connie Broden
- Ralph Buchanan
- Kelly Burnett
- Tod Campeau
- Billy Carter
- Gilles Dubé
- Reg Fleming
- Phil Goyette
- Charlie Hodge
- Bucky Hollingworth
- Eddie Johnston
- Forbes Kennedy
- Claude LaForge
- Donnie Marshall
- George McAvoy
- Bob McCord
- Al Millar
- Dickie Moore
- Johnny Peirson
- Jimmy Peters Sr.
- Gerry Plamondon
- André Pronovost
- Claude Pronovost
- Claude Provost
- Henri Richard
- Ernie Roche
- Dollard St. Laurent
- Gerry Wilson

Independent (1955–1958), Eastern Ontario Senior Hockey League (1958–59), Metropolitan Junior Hockey League (1959–60) and Senior Interprovincial Hockey League (1960–61)

- Ralph Backstrom
- Murray Balfour
- Gilles Boisvert
- André Boudrias
- Billy Carter
- Claude Cyr
- Norm Dennis
- Germain Gagnon
- Bruce Gamble
- Terry Gray
- Don Johns
- Jacques Laperrière
- Keith McCreary
- Bobby Rousseau
- Brian Smith
- Irv Spencer
- Gilles Tremblay
- J. C. Tremblay
- Gerry Wilson

Ontario Hockey Association (1961–1972)

- Kerry Bond
- Christian Bordeleau
- J. P. Bordeleau
- Paulin Bordeleau
- Pierre Bouchard
- André Boudrias
- Robin Burns
- Bob Champoux
- Bob Charlebois
- Guy Charron
- Terry Clancy
- Gary Connelly
- Jacques Cossette
- Yvan Cournoyer
- Norm Dennis
- Norm Descôteaux
- Michel Dion
- René Drolet
- Jude Drouin
- Guy Dufour
- André Dupont
- Rocky Farr
- Norm Ferguson
- Germain Gagnon
- Scott Garland
- André Gaudette
- John Garrett
- Allan Globensky
- Jean-Guy Gratton
- Norm Gratton
- John Gravel
- Lucien Grenier
- Jocelyn Guevremont
- Bob Guindon
- Réjean Houle
- Mike Hyndman
- Billy Inglis
- François Lacombe
- André Lacroix
- Jean-Guy Lagace
- Serge Lajeunesse
- Bobby Lalonde
- Jacques Laperrière
- Camille LaPierre
- Guy Lapointe
- Jacques Lemaire
- Bob Lemieux
- Rich Lemieux
- Dave Logan
- Blair MacKasey
- Rick Martin
- Hartland Monahan
- Ted Ouimet
- Craig Patrick
- Gilbert Perreault
- Larry Pleau
- Rich Pumple
- Fern Rivard
- Jim Rutherford
- Nick Sanza
- Serge Savard
- André St. Laurent
- Ralph Stewart
- Steve Sutherland
- Marc Tardif
- Jean Tétreault
- Leo Thiffault
- Ted Tucker
- Ian Turnbull
- Rogatien Vachon
- Carol Vadnais
- Wayne Wood

== Season-by-season results ==
Regular season and playoffs results:

- Junior Amateur Hockey Association (1933–1937 and 1940–1949)
- Quebec Junior Hockey League (1949–1955)
- Independent team without a league (1955–1958)
- Eastern Ontario Senior Hockey League (1958–59)
- Metropolitan Junior Hockey League (1959–60)
- Interprovincial Senior Hockey League (1960–61) (Note: 1960–61 seasons results are calculated based on the standings before the last game, and the result of the last game.)
- Ontario Hockey Association (1961–1972)

Legend: GP = Games played, W = Wins, L = Losses, T = Ties, Pts = Points, GF = Goals for, GA = Goals against

Memorial Cup champions	Memorial Cup finalists	League champions	League finalists

Season	Regular season									Playoffs
Season	GP	W	L	T	Pts	Pct	GF	GA	Finish	Playoffs
1933–34	8	4	1	3	11		27	15	1st JAHA	Lost JAHA final (Montreal Junior Royals) 5–4
1934–35	10	3	6	1	7		28	46	5th JAHA	Lost 4th-place tiebreaker (Verdun Maple Leafs) 5-4
1935–36	10	0	7	3	3		28	35	6th JAHA	Did not qualify
1936–37	11	5	4	2	12		46	40	3rd JAHA	Lost semifinal (Montreal Junior Royals) 14–13
Did not operate from 1937 to 1940
1940–41	12	7	5	0	14		42	33	3rd JAHA	Won semifinal (Verdun Maple Leafs) 11–2; Lost JAHA final (Montreal Junior Royals) 2–0
1941–42	12	5	6	1	11		54	44	2nd JAHA	Won semifinal (Montreal Concordia Civics) 16–11; Lost JAHA final (Montreal Junior Royals) 2–0
1942–43	21	13	7	1	27		102	68	1st JAHA	Won semifinal (Verdun Maple Leafs) 3–0; Won JAHA final (Montreal Junior Royals) 3–1; Won QAHA semifinal (Valleyfield Canadiens) 15–5; Won QAHA final (Town of Mount Royal) 6–1; Won Eastern Canada semifinal (Sydney Bruins) 2–0; Lost Eastern Canada final (Oshawa Generals) 3–0
1943–44	15	10	3	2	22		79	39	2nd JAHA	Lost semifinal (Montreal Concordia Civics) 2–1
1944–45	12	8	4	0	16		66	45	2nd JAHA	Won semifinal (Verdun Terriers) 2–0; Lost JAHA final (Montreal Junior Royals) 4–0
1945–46	19	11	7	1	23		92	69	1st JAHA	Won semifinal (Montreal Nationale) 2–0–2; Won JAHA final (Montreal Concordia Civics) 2–1; Won Eastern Canada semifinal (Ottawa St. Patrick's) 2–0; Lost Eastern Canada final (Toronto St. Michael's Majors) 3–0
1946–47	27	23	2	2	48		164	62	1st JAHA	Won semifinal (Lachine Rapides) 4–0; Won JAHA final (Montreal Nationale) 3–1; Won Eastern Canada quarterfinal (Halifax St. Mary's) 3–0; Won Eastern Canada semifinal (Inkerman Rockets) 2–0; Lost Eastern Canada final (Toronto St. Michael's Majors) 3–0
1947–48	32	15	12	5	35		105	86	3rd South	Lost quarterfinal (Quebec Citadelles) 3–2
1948–49	44	23	20	1	53		–	–	3rd South	Lost quarterfinal (Trois-Rivieres Reds) 3–1
1949–50	36	28	8	0	56		–	–	1st QJHL	Won semifinal (Trois-Rivieres Reds) 5–4; Won QJHL final (Quebec Citadelles) 4–2–1; Won Eastern Canada semifinal (Halifax St. Mary's) 2–0; Won Eastern Canada final (Guelph Biltmores) 4–2; Won 1950 Memorial Cup final (Regina Pats) 4–1
1950–51	45	27	18	0	54		157	132	3rd QJHL	Lost semifinal (Quebec Citadelles) 5–4
1951–52	50	35	12	3	73		218	115	1st QJHL	Won semifinal (Trois-Rivieres Reds) 5–0; Won QJHL final (Quebec Citadelles) 4–2; Won Eastern Canada semifinal (Eastview-St. Charles) 2–0; Lost Eastern Canada final (Guelph Biltmores) 4–2
1952–53	47	37	10	0	74		230	107	1st QJHL	Won semifinal (Montreal Junior Royals) 4–0; Won QJHL final (Quebec Citadelles) by default (Note: The Quebec Citadelles withdrew from the QAHA and abandoned the QJHL playoffs, following a dispute over a suspension to coach Phil Watson.); QJHL teams ineligible for Eastern Canada playoffs (Note: The Quebec Amateur Hockey Association which was the governing body of the QJHL, was suspended from the Canadian Amateur Hockey Association and ineligible for the national playoffs.)
1953–54	55	45	8	2	92		312	116	1st QJHL	Won semifinal (Trois-Rivieres Reds) 4–0; Lost QJHL final (Quebec Frontenacs) 4–0
1954–55	34	16	17	1	33		112	104	3rd QJHL	Lost semifinal round-robin (Quebec Frontenacs and Trois-Rivieres Flambeaux) 3rd place
1955–56	24	18	3	3	39		97	51	1st Laurier Cup	Won Eastern Canada semifinal (Ottawa Shamrocks) 2–0; Lost Eastern Canada final (Toronto Marlboros) 4–3–1
1956–57	68	35	26	7	N/A		253	220	Exh. Schedule	Won Eastern Canada semifinal (Ottawa Shamrocks) 2–0; Won Eastern Canada final (Guelph Biltmores) 4–1–1; Lost 1957 Memorial Cup final (Flin Flon Bombers) 4–3
1957–58	63	32	29	2	N/A		319	283	Exh. Schedule	Won Eastern Canada semifinal (Cape Breton All-Stars) 2–0; Won Eastern Canada final (Toronto Marlboros) 4–1; Won 1958 Memorial Cup final (Regina Pats) 4–2
1958–59	52	20	25	7	47		161	219	3rd EOSHL	Lost EOSHL semifinal (Kingston Merchants) 3–2–2; Won Eastern Canada semifinal (Quebec Baronets) 2–0; Lost Eastern Canada final (Peterborough Petes) 4–2–1
1959–60	26	25	1	0	50		–	–	1st MJHL	Won Quebec provincial semifinal (Shawinigan Cataractes) 2–0; Won Quebec provincial final (Alma Aiglons) 2–0; Won Eastern Canada semifinal (Ottawa-Hawkesbury Montagnards) 3–0; Lost Eastern Canada final (St. Catharines Teepees) 4–3–1
1960–61	24	16	2	6	38		–	–	1st ISHL	Won semifinal (Smiths Falls Rideaus) 4–0; Won ISHL final (Ottawa St. Anthony's) 3–1; Lost Eastern Canada Allan Cup quarterfinal (Granby Victorias) 3–0
1961–62	50	34	11	5	73	0.730	230	138	1st OHA	Lost semifinal (Niagara Falls Flyers) 8–4
1962–63	50	27	14	9	63	0.630	201	146	2nd OHA	Won semifinal (Peterborough Petes) 9–3; Lost OHA final (Niagara Falls Flyers) 8–0
1963–64	56	35	16	5	75	0.670	289	188	2nd OHA	Won quarterfinal (Peterborough Petes) 8–2; Won semifinal (St. Catharines Black Hawks) 9–5; Lost OHA final (Toronto Marlboros) 9–1
1964–65	56	20	28	8	48	0.429	215	214	5th OHA	Lost quarterfinal (Toronto Marlboros) 9–7
1965–66	48	24	15	9	57	0.594	200	147	2nd OHA	Won quarterfinal (Hamilton Red Wings) 8–0; Lost semifinal (Oshawa Generals) 8–2
1966–67	48	16	23	9	41	0.427	176	204	7th OHA	Lost quarterfinal (Toronto Marlboros) 8–4
1967–68	54	39	12	3	81	0.750	261	170	2nd OHA	Won quarterfinal (St. Catharines Black Hawks) 9–1; Lost semifinal (Niagara Falls Flyers) 8–4
1968–69	54	37	11	6	80	0.741	303	171	1st OHA	Won quarterfinal (Hamilton Red Wings) 8–0; Won semifinal (Peterborough Petes) 8–0; Won OHA final (St. Catharines Black Hawks) 9–1; Won Eastern Canada final (Sorel Éperviers) 3–1; Won 1969 Memorial Cup final (Regina Pats) 4–0
1969–70	54	37	12	5	79	0.731	316	200	1st OHA	Won quarterfinal (Ottawa 67's) 8–2; Won semifinal (St. Catharines Black Hawks) 8–0; Won OHA final (Toronto Marlboros) 8–6; Won Eastern Canada semifinal (Sault Ste. Marie Greyhounds) 4–1; Won Eastern Canada final (Quebec Remparts) 3–0; Won 1970 Memorial Cup final (Weyburn Red Wings) 4–0
1970–71	62	35	19	8	78	0.629	295	235	4th OHA	Won quarterfinal (London Knights) 8–0; Lost semifinal (St. Catharines Black Hawks) 9–5
1971–72	63	13	40	10	36	0.286	237	315	9th OHA	Did not qualify

== Sources ==
- Lapp, Richard M.; Macaulay, Alec (1997). The Memorial Cup: Canada's National Junior Hockey Championship. Madeira Park, British Columbia: Harbour Publishing. ISBN 1-55017-170-4.
