= 19th National Hockey League All-Star Game =

Professional ice hockey exhibition game

19th NHL All-Star Game
	1	2	3	Total
All-Stars	0	3	2	5
Montreal Canadiens	0	2	0	2
- Date: October 20, 1965
- Arena: Montreal Forum
- City: Montreal
- MVP: Henri Richard (Montreal)
- Attendance: 13,529

The 19th National Hockey League All-Star Game was played in Montreal Forum on October 20, 1965, where the host Montreal Canadiens lost to a team of all-stars from the remaining NHL teams 5–2. It was the last time that an All-Star Game was held at the start of the season.

== The game ==
=== Game summary ===
#
Score
Team
Goalscorer (assist(s))
Time
First period

Montreal
Goaltender in: Worsley
0:00

All-Stars
Goaltender in: Hall
0:00

0–0
All-Stars
Penalty: Gadsby
0:48

0–0
Montreal
Goaltender out: Worsley
Goaltender in: Hodge
5:00

0–0
Montreal
Penalty: Beliveau
7:13

0–0
Montreal
Penalty: Harris
9:48

0–0
Montreal
Goaltender out: Hodge
Goaltender in: Worsley
9:48

0–0
Montreal
Penalty: Larose
13:27

0–0
Montreal
Goaltender out: Worsley
Goaltender in: Hodge
14:26

0–0
All-Stars
Penalty: Pronovost
16:08

0–0
Montreal
Penalty: Harris
16:33
Second period

0–2
Montreal
Goaltender out: Hodge
Goaltender in: Worsley
0:00

Montreal
Goaltender out: Worsley
Goaltender in: Hodge
5:14
1
0–1
Montreal
Goal: Beliveau (Duff, Rousseau)
6:48
2
0–2
Montreal
Goal: Laperriere (Backstrom, Larose)
11:00

0–2
Montreal
Goaltender out: Hodge
Goaltender in: Worsley
11:00
3
1–2
All-Stars
Goal: Ullman (Hull, Howe)
12:40

1–2
Montreal
Penalty: Balon
16:31

1–2
Montreal
Goaltender out: Worsley
Goaltender in: Hodge
16:31
4
2–2
All-Stars
Goal: Hull (Howe, Oliver) (PPG)
16:34
5
3–2
All-Stars
Goal: Howe (Ullman, Baun)
19:19
Third period

3–2
Montreal
Goaltender out: Hodge
Goaltender in: Worsley
0:00

3–2
Montreal
Goaltender out: Worsley
Goaltender in: Hodge
5:45

3–2
All-Stars
Penalty: Ellis
6:20
6
4–2
All-Stars
Goal: Bucyk (Gadsby, Oliver)
10:52

4–2
Montreal
Goaltender out: Hodge
Goaltender in: Worsley
11:05

4–2
Montreal
Penalty: Ferguson
11:57

4–2
All-Stars
Penalty: Howell
14:31

4–2
Montreal
Goaltender out: Worsley
Goaltender in: Hodge
15:44

4–2
All-Stars
Penalty: Howell
18:31
7
5–2
All-Stars
Goal: Howe (unassisted) (SHG)
18:39
Goaltenders
- Montreal : Worsley (30:46 minutes, 1 goal), Hodge (29:14 minutes, 4 goals).
- All-Stars: Hall (60:00 minutes, 2 goals)

Win/loss	W – Glenn Hall	L – Charlie Hodge

Shots on goal

	1	2	3	T
Montreal Canadiens	13	14	15	41
NHL All-Stars	8	12	5	25

Officials
- Referee: Art Skov
- Linesmen: Neil Armstrong, Matt Pavelich

- MVP: Gordie Howe, Detroit Red Wings
- Attendance: 14,284

Source: Podnieks

== Rosters ==
	Montreal Canadiens	All-Stars
Head coach	Toe Blake	Sid Abel (Detroit Red Wings)
Lineup	1 – G Charlie Hodge; 2 – D Jacques Laperriere; 3 – D J. C. Tremblay; 4 – C Jean Beliveau; 6 – C Ralph Backstrom; 8 – LW Dick Duff; 10 – D Ted Harris; 11 – RW Claude Larose; 14 – RW Claude Provost; 14 – RW Bobby Rousseau; 16 – C Henri Richard; 17 – D Jean-Guy Talbot; 19 – D Terry Harper; 20 – LW Dave Balon; 21 – LW Gilles Tremblay; 22 – LW John Ferguson; 24 – C Red Berenson; 26 – RW Jim Roberts; 30 – G Gump Worsley; Note: Laperriere and Provost were members of the 1964–65 First All-Star team.	First All-Star Team: 7 – LW Bobby Hull (Chicago Black Hawks); 8 – C Norm Ullman (Detroit Red Wings); 18 – D Pierre Pilote (Chicago Black Hawks); Second All-Star Team: 4 – D Bill Gadsby (Detroit Red Wings); 9 – RW Gordie Howe (Detroit Red Wings); 22 – LW Frank Mahovlich (Toronto Maple Leafs); Other players: 2 – D Bobby Baun (Toronto Maple Leafs); 3 – D Harry Howell (New York Rangers); 5 – D Marcel Pronovost (Detroit Red Wings); 6 – D Ted Green (Boston Bruins); 10 – C Alex Delvecchio (Detroit Red Wings); 11 – RW Ron Ellis (Toronto Maple Leafs); 12 – LW Vic Hadfield (New York Rangers); 14 – D Doug Mohns (Chicago Black Hawks); 15 – RW Rod Gilbert (New York Rangers); 16 – C Murray Oliver (Boston Bruins); 21 – LW Johnny Bucyk (Boston Bruins); 23 – RW Eric Nesterenko (Chicago Black Hawks); 24 – G Glenn Hall (Chicago Black Hawks)

Note: G = Goaltender, D = Defence, C = Centre, LW = Left Wing, RW = Right Wing Source: Podnieks

== See also ==
- 1965–66 NHL season
