= Rocky Farr =

Canadian ice hockey player

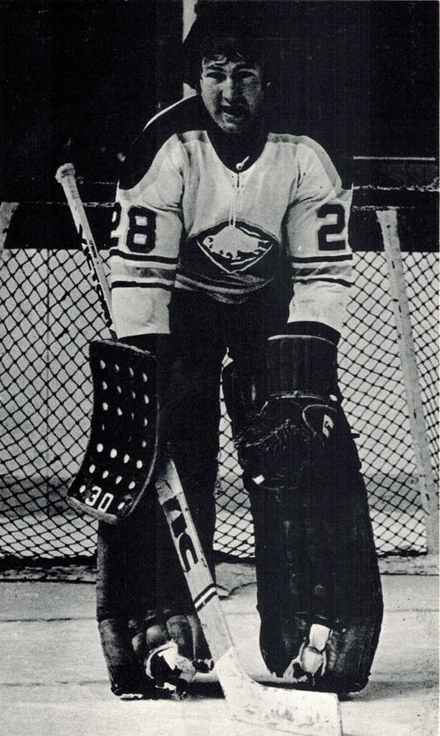
- Born: April 7, 1947 (age 78) Toronto, Ontario, Canada
- Height: 5 ft 11 in (180 cm)
- Weight: 180 lb (82 kg; 12 st 12 lb)
- Position: Goaltender
- Caught: Right
- Played for: Buffalo Sabres
- Playing career: 1967–1976

Norman Richard "Rocky" Farr (born April 7, 1947) is a Canadian former professional ice hockey goaltender. He played nineteen games in the National Hockey League with the Buffalo Sabres between 1973 and 1975, accumulating a record of 2-6-3. The rest of his career, which lasted from 1967 to 1976, was spent in various minor leagues.

== Junior career ==
Unsigned by any NHL team, Farr started his career with the Montreal Junior Canadiens of the major junior Ontario Hockey Association in 1964, a powerful team (with future NHL stars Yvan Cournoyer, Rogie Vachon, Jacques Lemaire, Serge Savard, Andre Lacroix and Andre Boudrias) that was the losing finalist to the Toronto Marlboros in the playoffs. He played eleven games that season, with the lowest goals against of any of the team's goaltenders.

The team did much more poorly in the 1965 season, and as the team's fourth-string goalie, Farr was sent down after ten games to the Maisonneuve Braves of the Montreal Metropolitan Junior Hockey League. He was traded in 1966 to the London Nationals, for which he played for a season and a half before being traded to the Oshawa Generals to finish his junior career.

== Professional career ==
Undrafted by any NHL team, Farr started his professional career with the Houston Apollos of the Central Hockey League (CHL). He spent the next five years in the minor leagues, principally with the Denver Spurs of the CHL. Drafted 38th in the 1970 NHL Expansion Draft by the Buffalo Sabres, he played for three seasons with their Cincinnati Swords farm team, including its record-shattering 1973 season, in which the Swords rampaged to the Calder Cup championship amidst breaking league marks for wins and points.

During that season, Farr made his NHL debut with the Sabres, due to starter Roger Crozier's recurring health problems with pancreatitis. He allowed three goals in 29 minutes in a losing effort against the Detroit Red Wings.

After a 1975 season in which Farr was the fourth goaltender on the Sabres' depth chart, he was sold to the Kansas City Scouts. His final season was spent with the Springfield Indians of the American Hockey League, and, playing poorly, retired at season's end.

In retirement, Farr and his wife Susan moved to Fort Worth, Texas, where he is a partner and vice-president in a financial advisory and wealth management firm.

== Career statistics ==
=== Regular season and playoffs ===
			Regular season									Playoffs
Season	Team	League	GP	W	L	T	MIN	GA	SO	GAA	SV%	GP	W	L	MIN	GA	SO	GAA	SV%
1963–64	Montreal NDG Monarchs	MMJHL	2	—	—	—	120	7	0	3.50	—	—	—	—	—	—	—	—	—
1963–64	Montreal Junior Canadiens	OHA	11	—	—	—	660	33	2	3.00	—	2	—	—	100	9	0	5.40	—
1964–65	Montreal Junior Canadiens	OHA	10	—	—	—	600	40	0	4.00	—	—	—	—	—	—	—	—	—
1965–66	London Nationals	OHA	47	11	29	7	2820	232	0	4.94	—	—	—	—	—	—	—	—	—
1966–67	London Nationals	OHA	24	—	—	—	1440	112	0	4.63	—	4	—	—	240	17	0	4.86	—
1967–68	Houston Apollos	CHL	18	4	10	1	888	53	1	3.58	—	—	—	—	—	—	—	—	—
1967–68	Cleveland Barons	AHL	5	2	2	0	270	17	0	3.78	—	—	—	—	—	—	—	—	—
1968–69	Denver Spurs	WHL	46	16	23	4	2667	180	2	4.05	.904	—	—	—	—	—	—	—	—
1968–69	Cleveland Barons	AHL	3	2	0	1	180	3	1	1.00	—	—	—	—	—	—	—	—	—
1969–70	Denver Spurs	WHL	47	16	21	7	2769	188	1	4.07	—	—	—	—	—	—	—	—	—
1970–71	Springfield Kings	AHL	4	0	3	1	166	18	0	6.50	—	—	—	—	—	—	—	—	—
1970–71	Salt Lake Golden Eagles	WHL	25	6	15	0	1276	83	3	3.91	—	—	—	—	—	—	—	—	—
1970–71	Fort Worth Wings	CHL	1	0	0	0	15	0	0	0.00	1.000	1	0	1	60	4	0	4.00	—
1971–72	Cincinnati Swords	AHL	52	20	16	10	2843	145	2	3.06	—	9	4	3	472	21	0	2.66	—
1972–73	Buffalo Sabres	NHL	1	0	1	0	29	3	0	6.25	.864	—	—	—	—	—	—	—	—
1972–73	Cincinnati Swords	AHL	48	—	—	—	2746	121	3	2.64	—	12	—	—	720	35	0	2.91	—
1973–74	Buffalo Sabres	NHL	11	2	4	1	478	25	0	3.14	.905	—	—	—	—	—	—	—	—
1973–74	Cincinnati Swords	AHL	16	7	3	2	812	47	1	3.47	—	—	—	—	—	—	—	—	—
1974–75	Buffalo Sabres	NHL	7	0	1	2	214	14	0	3.93	.876	—	—	—	—	—	—	—	—
1975–76	Springfield Indians	AHL	6	0	3	1	222	30	0	8.11	—	—	—	—	—	—	—	—	—
1976–77	Johnstown Jets	NAHL	1	0	1	0	60	8	0	8.00	—	—	—	—	—	—	—	—	—
NHL totals			19	2	6	3	720	42	0	3.50	.894	—	—	—	—	—	—	—	—
