= 21st National Hockey League All-Star Game =

Professional ice hockey exhibition game

21st NHL All-Star Game
	1	2	3	Total
All-Stars	1	1	1	3
Toronto Maple Leafs	1	2	1	4
- Date: January 16, 1968
- Arena: Maple Leaf Gardens
- City: Toronto
- MVP: Bruce Gamble (Toronto)
- Attendance: 15,753

The 21st National Hockey League All-Star Game was played in Maple Leaf Gardens on January 16, 1968, where the host Toronto Maple Leafs battled a team of all-stars from the remaining NHL teams. It was the last time that Maple Leaf Gardens would host the game, and it was also the final game under the Stanley Cup champions-versus-NHL All-Stars format, as the NHL would switch to a divisional format for the game in 1969.

== Death of Bill Masterton ==
The game, compared to other years, was in a somber mood: two days before, Bill Masterton, a player for the Minnesota North Stars, was hit by two Oakland Seals players on the ice, causing him to lose his balance and hit his head on the ice. Masterton was pronounced dead the next day.

The death of Masterton raised an issue about the use of helmets in hockey - whether they should be mandatory, and whether they affect a player's abilities. Response was mixed in the helmet debate even in the days following Masterton's death: Gordie Howe claimed that he would not, but nevertheless encouraged the next generation of players to do so, while Bobby Hull claimed that he was in serious consideration. At one extreme, Stafford Smythe claimed that helmets should be made mandatory.

As for the game itself, only two players would wear helmets: J. C. Tremblay, who had worn a helmet all season, and Brian Conacher, as a result of Masterton's death. Helmets would not become mandatory in the NHL until 1979, and even then players under contract prior to June 1, 1979, were grandfathered in provided they signed a waiver. Craig MacTavish was the last player to appear in the All-Star Game without a helmet, appearing in the 1996 All-Star Game during his second-to-last season as a player.

On the day of the all-star game, the National Hockey League Writers' Association proposed that a trophy should be presented in Masterton's honor, and by the end of the season, the league made it a reality. The Bill Masterton Memorial Trophy is awarded to each year to the player who best exemplifies dedication, perseverance, and sportsmanship.

As an aside, despite the somber mood, Toronto coach Punch Imlach and his wife celebrated their silver wedding anniversary the night of the All-Star Game.

== The game ==
The 1968 classic was also home to a notable first: because Toronto goaltender Johnny Bower was injured ten days before the game and could not play, he was replaced with Al Smith, their starting minor league goaltender.

As it turned out, this year would be the last in which the defending champions faced off against a team consisting of the "best of the rest" - NHL president Clarence Campbell hinted that the following year would be the first in which there would be an East-versus-West battle, citing that the game could be easily moved to different cities. The 21st classic was also the last in which the teams were determined based on the previous season's First and Second All-Star Teams, a move supported by the absence of then-rookie Bobby Orr in the previous season's game and the fact that the game had moved to mid-season.

Orr was injured in the third period by Pete Stemkowski, breaking his collarbone.

=== Game summary ===
#	Score	Team	Goalscorer (Assist(s))	Time
First period
		Toronto	Goaltender in: Gamble	0:00
		All-Stars	Goaltender in: Giacomin	0:00
1	0-1	Toronto	Goal: Oliver (Mahovlich, Hillman)
	0–1	Toronto	Penalty: Stemkowski	14:10
	0–1	All-Stars	Penalty: Howell	17:54
2	1-1	All-Stars	Goal: Mikita (Hull, Tremblay) (SH)	19:53
Second period
	1–1	All-Stars	Goaltender out: Giacomin; Goaltender in: Sawchuk	0:00
3	2–1	All-Stars	Goal: Wharram (Mikita)	0:35
	2–1	All-Stars	Penalty: Howe	3:53
4	2–2	Toronto	Goal: Stanley (Stemkowski, Carleton)	7:56
5	2–3	Toronto	Goal: Stemkowski (Carleton, Rupp)	16:36
Third period
	2–3	Toronto	Goaltender out: Gamble; Goaltender in: Smith	0:00
	2–3	All-Stars	Goaltender out: Sawchuk; Goaltender in: Hall	0:00
6	2-4	Toronto	Goal: Ellis (Mahovlich, Hillman)	5:56
7	3-4	All-Stars	Goal: Ullman (Howe, Orr)	8:23
	3–4	Toronto	Penalty: Walton	14:42
	3–4	All-Stars	Penalty: Howe	14:42
	3–4	All-Stars	Goaltender out: Hall	18:59
Goaltenders
Toronto: Gamble (40:00 minutes), Smith (W) (20:00 minutes).; West: Giacomin (20:00 minutes), Sawchuk (20:00 minutes), Hall (W) (18:59 minutes).; Win/loss / W - Al Smith / L - Glenn Hall
Shots on goal
Shots on goal: Toronto / 9 / 18 / 14 / 41; All-Stars / 19 / 11 / 10 / 40
Officials
Referee: Bill Friday; Linesmen: Brent Casselman, Pat Shetler

- MVP: Bruce Gamble, Toronto Maple Leafs
- Attendance: 15,753

Source: Podnieks

== Rosters ==
	Toronto Maple Leafs	All-Stars
Head coach	Punch Imlach	Toe Blake (Montreal Canadiens)
Lineup	1 - G Al Smith; 2 - D Larry Hillman; 3 - D Marcel Pronovost; 4 - D Duane Rupp; 7 - D Tim Horton; 8 - RW Ron Ellis; 10 - RW George Armstrong (Captain); 11 - C Murray Oliver; 12 - C Pete Stemkowski; 14 - C Dave Keon; 16 - C Mike Walton; 18 - RW Jim Pappin; 20 - LW Bob Pulford; 22 - LW Brian Conacher; 25 - LW Wayne Carleton; 26 - D Allan Stanley; 27 - LW Frank Mahovlich; 30 - G Bruce Gamble	First All-Star Team: 1 - G Ed Giacomin (New York Rangers); 2 - D Pierre Pilote (Chicago Black Hawks); 3 - D Harry Howell (New York Rangers); 10 - LW Bobby Hull (Chicago Black Hawks); 17 - RW Ken Wharram (Chicago Black Hawks); 21 - C Stan Mikita (Chicago Black Hawks); Second All-Star Team: 5 - D Bobby Orr (Boston Bruins); 7 - C Norm Ullman (Detroit Red Wings); 9 - RW Gordie Howe (Detroit Red Wings); 22 - LW Don Marshall (New York Rangers); 25 - G Glenn Hall (St. Louis Blues); Other Players: 4 - C Jean Beliveau (Montreal Canadiens); 6 - D Jacques Laperriere (Montreal Canadiens); 8 - D Bobby Baun (Oakland Seals); 11 - LW Johnny Bucyk (Boston Bruins); 12 - RW Ken Schinkel (Pittsburgh Penguins); 14 - D J. C. Tremblay (Montreal Canadiens); 15 - RW Leon Rochefort (Philadelphia Flyers); 18 - LW Dave Balon (Minnesota North Stars); 24 - G Terry Sawchuk (Los Angeles Kings)

Note: G = Goaltender, D = Defence, C = Centre, LW = Left Wing, RW = Right Wing Source: Podnieks

== See also ==
- 1967–68 NHL season
