= 20th National Hockey League All-Star Game =

Professional ice hockey exhibition game

20th NHL All-Star Game
	1	2	3	Total
All-Stars	0	0	0	0
Montreal Canadiens	2	0	1	3
- Date: January 18, 1967
- Arena: Montreal Forum
- City: Montreal
- MVP: Henri Richard (Montreal)
- Attendance: 14,284

The 20th National Hockey League All-Star Game was played in Montreal Forum on January 18, 1967, where the host Montreal Canadiens defeated a team of all-stars from the remaining NHL teams 3–0. It was the first, and to date, only time a shutout occurred in an All-Star Game. It was the first All-Star Game held in mid-season. The previous Game was held in October 1965.

== The game ==
The game was considered a dull affair by the writers. Only three minor penalties were called. Montreal's John Ferguson scored two goals and punched Norm Ullman to earn a penalty. The All-Stars' coach, Sid Abel, chose New York's Ed Giacomin over his own goalie Roger Crozier, who had been playoff MVP in the previous playoffs. Bobby Orr was not chosen to the game, as the selections were to be based on the previous season's performance.

=== Game summary ===
#
Score
Team
Goalscorer (Assist(s))
Time
First period

Montreal
Goaltender in: Hodge
0:00

All-Stars
Goaltender in: Hall
0:00
1
0-1
Montreal
Goal: Richard (Rousseau, Harper)
14:03
2
0-2
Montreal
Goal: Ferguson (Larose)
15:59
Second period

0–2
Montreal
Goaltender out: Hodge
Goaltender in: Bauman
0:00

0–2
All-Stars
Penalty: Howell
6:58

0–2
Montreal
Penalty: Richard
7:19

0–2
Montreal
Penalty: Ferguson
10:00

0–2
All-Stars
Goaltender out: Hall
Goaltender in: Giacomin
10:00
Third period

0–2
Montreal
Goaltender out: Bauman
Goaltender in: Hodge
0:00
3
0-3
Montreal
Goal: Ferguson (Richard, Rousseau)
19:52
Goaltenders
- Montreal : Hodge (40:00 minutes), Bauman (20:00 minutes).
- All-Stars: Hall (30:00 minutes), Giacomin (30:00 minutes).

Win/loss	W - Charlie Hodge	L - Glenn Hall

Shots on goal

	1	2	3	T
Montreal Canadiens	14	7	9	30
NHL All-Stars	10	10	15	35

Officials
- Referee: Vern Buffey
- Linesmen: Neil Armstrong, Matt Pavelich

- MVP: Henri Richard, Montreal Canadiens
- Attendance: 14,284

Source: Podnieks

== Rosters ==
	Montreal Canadiens	All-Stars
Head coach	Toe Blake	Sid Abel (Detroit Red Wings)
Lineup	1 - G Charlie Hodge; 2 - D Jacques Laperriere; 3 - D J. C. Tremblay; 6 - C Ralph Backstrom; 8 - LW Dick Duff; 10 - D Ted Harris; 11 - RW Claude Larose; 12 - RW Yvan Cournoyer; 12 - RW Claude Provost; 14 - RW Bobby Rousseau; 16 - C Henri Richard; 17 - D Jean-Guy Talbot; 18 - LW Andre Boudrias; 19 - D Terry Harper; 20 - LW Dave Balon; 21 - LW Gilles Tremblay; 22 - LW John Ferguson; 23 - D Noel Price; 30 - G Gary Bauman; Note: Laperriere was a member of the 1965–66 First All-Star team, and Rousseau was a member of the 1965–66 Second All-Star team. Montreal captain Jean Beliveau, who did not play, and goaltender Gump Worsley, who was injured, were also members of the Second All-Star team.	First All-Star Team: 1 - G Glenn Hall (Chicago Black Hawks); 9 - RW Gordie Howe (Detroit Red Wings); 11 - LW Bobby Hull (Chicago Black Hawks); 18 - D Pierre Pilote (Chicago Black Hawks); 21 - C Stan Mikita (Chicago Black Hawks); Second All-Star Team: 2 - D Allan Stanley (Toronto Maple Leafs); 12 - D Pat Stapleton (Chicago Black Hawks); 22 - LW Frank Mahovlich (Toronto Maple Leafs); Other Players: 3 - D Harry Howell (New York Rangers); 4 - D Jim Neilson (New York Rangers); 7 - C Norm Ullman (Detroit Red Wings); 8 - RW Bob Nevin (New York Rangers); 10 - C Alex Delvecchio (Detroit Red Wings); 14 - C Dave Keon (Toronto Maple Leafs); 15 - RW Rod Gilbert (New York Rangers); 16 - C Murray Oliver (Boston Bruins); 24 - G Ed Giacomin (New York Rangers)

Note: G = Goalkeeper, D = Defence, C = Centre, LW = Left Wing, RW = Right Wing Source: Podnieks

== See also ==
- 1966–67 NHL season
