= Billy Carter (ice hockey) =

Canadian ice hockey player (1937–2024)

- Born: December 2, 1937 Cornwall, Ontario, Canada
- Died: June 25, 2024 (aged 86) South Stormont, Ontario, Canada
- Height: 5 ft 11 in (180 cm)
- Weight: 154 lb (70 kg; 11 st 0 lb)
- Position: Centre
- Shot: Left
- Played for: Montreal Canadiens; Boston Bruins
- Playing career: 1956–1969

William Gordon Carter (December 2, 1937 – June 25, 2024) was a Canadian professional ice hockey forward who played 16 games in the National Hockey League for the Montreal Canadiens and Boston Bruins between 1957 and 1962. The rest of his career, which lasted from 1956 to 1969, was spent in various minor leagues. Carter died on June 25, 2024, at the age of 86.

== Playing career ==
A native of Eastern Ontario's easternmost city, Cornwall, Billy Carter started in 1956 at the age of 18, playing for the Ottawa Junior Canadiens.. He participated in two Memorial Cup championships, losing to Flin Flon Bombers in 1957, and victorious in 1958, over the Regina Pats. In his 13-year professional career, he also played for many American teams, including the Omaha Knights in 1964–65 and 1967–68, the Buffalo Bisons in 1965–66, 1966–67 and, alongside his Omaha Knights commitment, in 1967–68. His final season before retirement, 1968–69, was spent with the Denver Spurs. In Ottawa Hull, and briefly in Omaha, he played under coach Scotty Bowman. After retirement, he returned to the Cornwall-Seaway Valley area, and was involved in the community until his death in 2024.

== Career statistics ==
=== Regular season and playoffs ===
			Regular season					Playoffs
Season	Team	League	GP	G	A	Pts	PIM	GP	G	A	Pts	PIM
1954–55	Hochelaga Indians	QJHL	36	25	35	60	6	—	—	—	—	—
1955–56	Montreal Junior Canadiens	QJHL	—	—	—	—	—	—	—	—	—	—
1955–56	Montreal Junior Canadiens	M-Cup	—	—	—	—	—	1	0	0	0	2
1956–57	Hull-Ottawa Canadiens	QHL	20	5	18	23	2	—	—	—	—	—
1956–57	Hull-Ottawa Canadiens	OHA	28	14	17	31	21	—	—	—	—	—
1956–57	Hull-Ottawa Canadiens	EOHL	16	7	7	14	6	11	7	11	18	28
1956–57	Rochester Americans	AHL	1	0	0	0	0	—	—	—	—	—
1956–57	Hull-Ottawa Canadiens	M-Cup	—	—	—	—	—	15	11	9	20	2
1957–58	Hull-Ottawa Canadiens	OHA	27	15	29	44	26	—	—	—	—	—
1957–58	Hull-Ottawa Canadiens	EOHL	34	14	38	52	2	—	—	—	—	—
1957–58	Montreal Royals	QHL	1	0	0	0	0	—	—	—	—	—
1957–58	Montreal Canadiens	NHL	1	0	0	0	0	—	—	—	—	—
1957–58	Rochester Americans	AHL	1	1	0	1	0	—	—	—	—	—
1957–58	Hull-Ottawa Canadiens	M-Cup	—	—	—	—	—	13	15	15	30	4
1958–59	Rochester Americans	AHL	69	7	19	26	10	5	0	0	0	0
1959–60	Hull-Ottawa Canadiens	EPHL	70	42	60	102	2	7	1	4	5	2
1960–61	Boston Bruins	NHL	8	0	0	0	8	—	—	—	—	—
1960–61	Hull-Ottawa Canadiens	EPHL	60	27	32	59	6	14	4	5	9	6
1961–62	Montreal Canadiens	NHL	7	0	0	0	4	—	—	—	—	—
1961–62	Hull-Ottawa Canadiens	EPHL	62	26	47	73	17	13	6	8	14	0
1962–63	Hull-Ottawa Canadiens	EPHL	72	27	50	77	12	3	0	0	0	0
1963–64	Quebec Aces	AHL	36	2	9	11	2	—	—	—	—	—
1963–64	Seattle Totems	WHL	16	3	4	7	0	—	—	—	—	—
1964–65	Seattle Totems	WHL	16	0	2	2	0	—	—	—	—	—
1964–65	Memphis Wings	CHL	29	5	16	21	0	—	—	—	—	—
1964–65	Omaha Knights	CHL	12	1	4	5	0	6	1	4	5	0
1965–66	Buffalo Bisons	AHL	71	16	45	61	2	—	—	—	—	—
1966–67	Buffalo Bisons	AHL	71	14	38	52	8	—	—	—	—	—
1967–68	Buffalo Bisons	AHL	2	0	0	0	0	—	—	—	—	—
1967–68	Omaha Knights	CHL	67	9	30	39	6	—	—	—	—	—
1968–69	Denver Spurs	WHL	74	16	49	65	4	—	—	—	—	—
AHL totals			251	40	111	151	22	5	0	0	0	0
NHL totals			16	0	0	0	6	—	—	—	—	—
