= Jacques Laperrière =

Canadian ice hockey player (born 1941)

- Hockey Hall of Fame, 1987
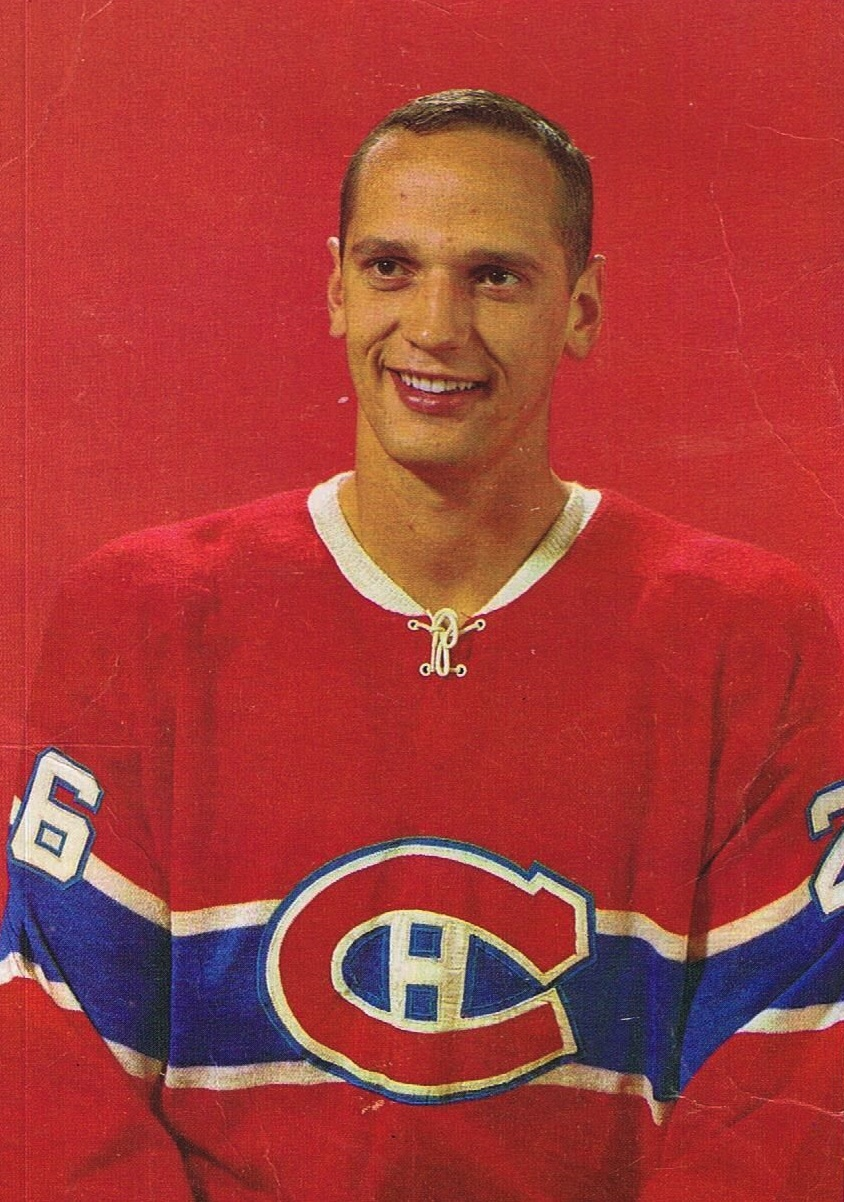
- Laperrière with the Montreal Canadiens, c. 1963
- Born: November 22, 1941 (age 84) Béarn, Quebec, Canada
- Height: 6 ft 2 in (188 cm)
- Weight: 190 lb (86 kg; 13 st 8 lb)
- Position: Defence
- Shot: Left
- Played for: Montreal Canadiens
- Playing career: 1962–1974

Joseph Jacques Hughes Laperrière (born November 22, 1941) is a Canadian professional ice hockey coach and former player. Laperrière played for the Montreal Canadiens in the National Hockey League (NHL) from 1962 until 1974, winning six Stanley Cups on his way to induction in the Hall of Fame. As a coach, he was a member of two Stanley Cup-winning staffs. He is the father of NHL hockey player Daniel Laperrière and of AHL coach Martin Laperrière.

== Playing career ==
Born in Béarn, Quebec, Laperrière grew up idolizing the Montreal Canadiens. Doug Harvey was Laperriere's favourite player as they both played defence. Laperrière spent his junior career with the Hull-Ottawa Canadiens, the Montreal Junior Canadiens and the Brockville Jr. Canadiens. In 1962–63 he made his debut in the National Hockey League with the Montreal Canadiens, playing six games in the regular season and five more in the playoffs against the Toronto Maple Leafs.

The next season saw Laperrière earn a full-time spot on the Canadiens' roster. In his rookie season, he recorded 30 points, served 102 minutes in penalties and made few defensive errors. He won the Calder Memorial Trophy as the top rookie in the NHL, beating out teammate John Ferguson. He also was selected to play in the 1964 NHL All-Star Game and named to the NHL second All-Star team as a defenceman. This was the first time a rookie had earned a spot on the NHL All-Star team since World War II.

In 1964–65, Laperrière had another stellar season as he was named to the NHL's first All-Star team, and he won the Stanley Cup as the Canadiens defeated the Chicago Black Hawks in seven games. The following season Laperrière missed 13 games and the entire playoffs due to injuries, but was still awarded the James Norris Memorial Trophy for best defenceman in the league, and he was selected to the NHL first All-Star team for the second year in a row. The Canadiens won the Stanley Cup that year, defeating the Detroit Red Wings.

Laperrière played eight more seasons with the Canadiens, winning four more Stanley Cups. In 1972–73, he led the league in P Plus–minus being the only player other than Bobby Orr to lead the league in that statistic between 1969 and 1975. He retired halfway through the 1973–74 season due to a career-ending knee injury.

He was inducted into the Hockey Hall of Fame in 1987.

== Coaching career ==
After his playing career, Laperrière became the coach of the Montreal Juniors in 1975–76. He resigned the following year due to his distaste of the pressure and violence at the amateur level. In 1980–81, he rejoined the Canadiens as an assistant coach, a position he held for 16 years, serving under six different head coaches, and winning two Stanley Cups in 1985–86 and in 1992–93. In 1997–98, Laperrière joined the Boston Bruins, serving as an assistant coach for four seasons. In 2001–02 he joined the New York Islanders, with whom he spent two seasons. He then joined the New Jersey Devils in 2003–04, first as an assistant coach, then, in 2006–07, as a special assignment coach.

== Awards and achievements ==
- Calder Memorial Trophy — 1964
- NHL second All-Star team — 1964, 1970
- NHL All-Star Games — 1964, 1965, 1967, 1968, 1970
- Stanley Cup champion — 1965, 1966, 1968, 1969, 1971, 1973 (as a player, Montreal)
- NHL first All-Star team — 1965, 1966
- James Norris Memorial Trophy — 1966
- NHL Plus/Minus leader — 1973
- Stanley Cup champion — 1986, 1993 (as an assistant coach, Montreal)
- Inducted into Hockey Hall of Fame in 1987

== Career statistics ==
=== Regular season and playoffs ===
			Regular season					Playoffs
Season	Team	League	GP	G	A	Pts	PIM	GP	G	A	Pts	PIM
1958–59	Hull-Ottawa Canadiens	EOHL	1	1	1	2	2	2	0	0	0	0
1958–59	Hull-Ottawa Canadiens	M-Cup	—	—	—	—	—	9	1	0	1	16
1959–60	Brockville Canadiens	OVJHL	—	—	—	—	—	—	—	—	—	—
1959–60	Hull-Ottawa Canadiens	EPHL	5	0	2	2	0	—	—	—	—	—
1959–60	Brockville Jr. Canadiens	M-Cup	—	—	—	—	—	13	0	13	13	34
1960–61	Hull Canadiens	IPSHL	—	11	29	40	—	—	—	—	—	—
1960–61	Hull-Ottawa Canadiens	EPHL	5	0	0	0	2	3	0	2	2	4
1960-61	Hull Canadiens	Al-Cup	—	—	—	—	—	3	0	0	0	4
1961–62	Montreal Jr. Canadiens	OHA	48	20	37	57	98	6	0	1	1	11
1961–62	Hull-Ottawa Canadiens	EPHL	1	0	0	0	4	7	1	4	5	6
1962–63	Montreal Canadiens	NHL	6	0	2	2	2	5	0	1	1	4
1962–63	Hull-Ottawa Canadiens	EPHL	40	8	19	27	51	2	0	0	0	0
1963–64	Montreal Canadiens	NHL	65	2	28	30	102	7	1	1	2	8
1964–65	Montreal Canadiens	NHL	67	5	22	27	92	6	1	1	2	16
1965–66	Montreal Canadiens	NHL	57	6	25	31	85	—	—	—	—	—
1966–67	Montreal Canadiens	NHL	61	0	20	20	48	9	0	1	1	9
1967–68	Montreal Canadiens	NHL	72	4	21	25	84	13	1	3	4	20
1968–69	Montreal Canadiens	NHL	69	5	26	31	45	14	1	3	4	28
1969–70	Montreal Canadiens	NHL	73	6	31	37	98	—	—	—	—	—
1970–71	Montreal Canadiens	NHL	49	0	16	16	20	20	4	9	13	12
1971–72	Montreal Canadiens	NHL	73	3	25	28	50	4	0	0	0	2
1972–73	Montreal Canadiens	NHL	57	7	16	23	34	10	1	3	4	2
1973–74	Montreal Canadiens	NHL	42	2	10	12	14	—	—	—	—	—
NHL totals			691	40	242	282	674	88	9	22	31	101

Preceded by Pierre Pilote	Winner of the Norris Trophy; 1966	Succeeded by Harry Howell
Preceded by Kent Douglas	Winner of the Calder Memorial Trophy; 1964	Succeeded by Roger Crozier
