= Norm Dennis =

Canadian retired ice hockey right winger

- Born: December 10, 1942 (age 82); Aurora, Ontario, Canada
- Height: 5 ft 11 in (180 cm)
- Weight: 180 lb (82 kg; 12 st 12 lb)
- Position: Right wing
- Shot: Left
- Played for: St. Louis Blues
- Playing career: 1962–1978

Norman Marshall Dennis (born December 10, 1942) is a Canadian retired ice hockey right winger. He played 12 games in the National Hockey League with the St. Louis Blues from 1969 to 1972. The rest of his career, which lasted from 1962 to 1978, was spent in the minor leagues.

== Career statistics ==
=== Regular season and playoffs ===
			Regular season					Playoffs
Season	Team	League	GP	G	A	Pts	PIM	GP	G	A	Pts	PIM
1959–60	Brockville Junior Canadiens	OVJHL	—	—	—	—	—	—	—	—	—	—
1959–60	Brockville Junior Canadiens	M-Cup	—	—	—	—	—	13	0	4	4	4
1960–61	Hull Canadiens	IPSHL	—	—	—	—	—	—	—	—	—	—
1961–62	Montreal Junior Canadiens	OHA	50	28	44	72	56	6	2	3	5	14
1962–63	Montreal Junior Canadiens	OHA	37	23	32	55	59	8	1	7	8	6
1962–63	Hull-Ottawa Canadiens	EPHL	1	0	0	0	0	—	—	—	—	—
1963–64	Omaha Knights	CHL	72	30	22	52	43	10	3	2	5	6
1964–65	Hershey Bears	AHL	6	1	1	2	4	—	—	—	—	—
1964–65	Cleveland Barons	AHL	1	0	0	0	0	—	—	—	—	—
1964–65	Omaha Knights	CHL	66	30	40	70	59	6	2	5	7	11
1965–66	Houston Apollos	CHL	70	23	36	59	82	—	—	—	—	—
1966–67	Houston Apollos	CHL	54	13	33	46	25	4	0	2	2	0
1967–68	Cleveland Barons	AHL	72	11	25	36	42	—	—	—	—	—
1968–69	St. Louis Blues	NHL	2	0	0	0	2	—	—	—	—	—
1968–69	Kansas City Blues	CHL	70	23	38	61	65	4	0	0	0	11
1969–70	St. Louis Blues	NHL	5	3	0	3	5	2	0	0	0	2
1969–70	Kansas City Blues	CHL	62	16	47	63	68	—	—	—	—	—
1970–71	St. Louis Blues	NHL	4	0	0	0	0	3	0	0	0	0
1970–71	Kansas City Blues	CHL	70	25	43	68	52	—	—	—	—	—
1971–72	St. Louis Blues	NHL	1	0	0	0	4	—	—	—	—	—
1971–72	Kansas City Blues	CHL	72	31	47	78	67	—	—	—	—	—
1972–73	Denver Spurs	WHL	72	27	50	77	35	5	4	1	5	0
1973–74	Providence Reds	AHL	75	23	50	73	43	15	2	12	14	19
1974–75	Providence Reds	AHL	36	2	11	13	22	3	0	0	0	0
1975–76	Trail Smoke Eaters	WIHL	24	3	8	11	24	—	—	—	—	—
1976–77	Trail Smoke Eaters	WIHL	24	0	5	5	4	—	—	—	—	—
1977–78	Trail Smoke Eaters	WIHL	24	2	6	8	4	—	—	—	—	—
CHL totals			536	191	306	497	461	24	5	9	14	17
NHL totals			12	3	0	3	11	5	0	0	0	2
