= Germain Gagnon =

Canadian ice hockey player (1942–2014)

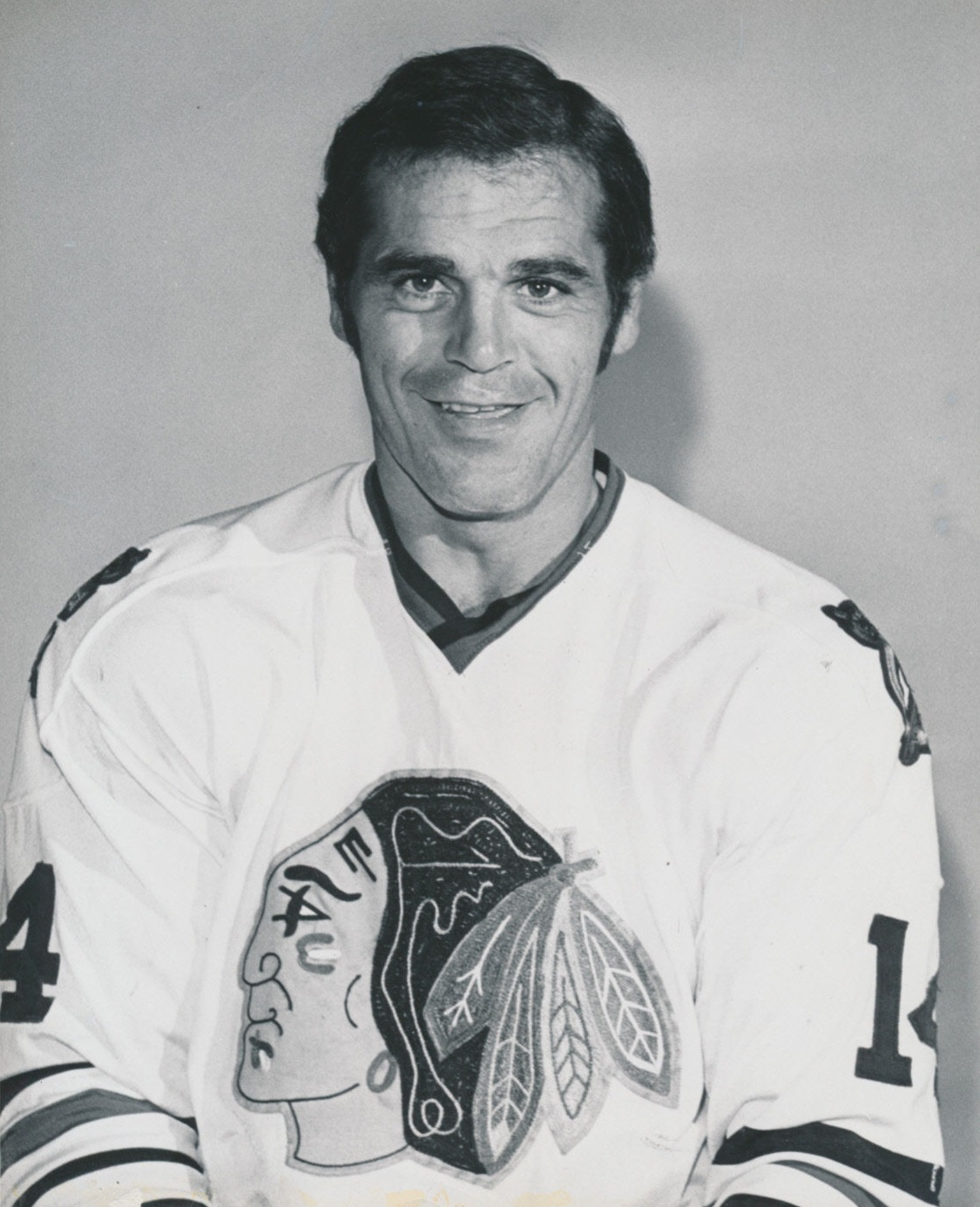
- Gagnon in 1973
- Born: December 9, 1942 Chicoutimi, Quebec, Canada
- Died: October 26, 2014 (aged 71) Chicoutimi, Quebec, Canada
- Height: 6 ft 0 in (183 cm)
- Weight: 175 lb (79 kg; 12 st 7 lb)
- Position: Left wing
- Shot: Left
- Played for: Montreal Canadiens; New York Islanders; Chicago Black Hawks; Kansas City Scouts
- Playing career: 1961–1976

Joseph Adrien Germain Gagnon (December 9, 1942 – October 26, 2014) was a Canadian professional ice hockey player who played 259 games in the National Hockey League. He played for the Montreal Canadiens, New York Islanders, Chicago Black Hawks, and Kansas City Scouts. An original Islander, Gagnon recorded three points, including the winning goal, in the Islanders first win on October 12, 1972. The full name was found in his Baptism document. Gagnon returned to Chicoutimi and died there after a long illness on October 26, 2014.

== Career statistics ==
=== Regular season and playoffs ===
			Regular season					Playoffs
Season	Team	League	GP	G	A	Pts	PIM	GP	G	A	Pts	PIM
1960–61	Lachine Maroons	MMJHL	—	—	—	—	—	—	—	—	—	—
1961–62	Montreal Junior Canadiens	OHA	48	20	37	57	63	6	3	4	7	4
1962–63	Montreal Junior Canadiens	OHA	50	19	38	57	72	10	3	4	7	16
1962–63	Hull-Ottawa Canadiens	EPHL	1	0	0	0	0	—	—	—	—	—
1963–64	Omaha Knights	CHL	59	10	25	35	32	10	7	4	11	6
1964–65	Quebec Aces	AHL	14	2	7	9	10	—	—	—	—	—
1964–65	Omaha Knights	CHL	55	13	25	38	73	6	0	1	1	11
1965–66	Houston Apollos	CHL	64	14	30	44	58	—	—	—	—	—
1966–67	Quebec Aces	AHL	7	0	1	1	0	—	—	—	—	—
1966–67	Providence Reds	AHL	5	0	0	0	0	—	—	—	—	—
1966–67	Houston Apollos	CHL	30	6	10	16	43	5	2	2	4	0
1967–68	Memphis South Stars	CHL	65	26	34	60	23	3	0	0	0	0
1968–69	Vancouver Canucks	WHL	61	8	21	29	16	8	1	2	3	0
1969–70	Vancouver Canucks	WHL	72	16	27	43	23	11	2	3	5	4
1970–71	Montreal Voyageurs	AHL	61	20	28	48	36	3	3	1	4	0
1971–72	Montreal Canadiens	NHL	4	0	0	0	0	—	—	—	—	—
1971–72	Nova Scotia Voyageurs	AHL	70	25	56	81	34	15	5	15	20	8
1972–73	New York Islanders	NHL	63	12	29	41	31	—	—	—	—	—
1973–74	New York Islanders	NHL	62	8	14	22	8	—	—	—	—	—
1973–74	Chicago Black Hawks	NHL	14	3	14	17	4	11	2	2	4	2
1974–75	Chicago Black Hawks	NHL	80	16	35	51	21	8	0	1	1	0
1975–76	Chicago Black Hawks	NHL	5	0	0	0	2	—	—	—	—	—
1975–76	Springfield Indians	AHL	4	0	1	1	2	—	—	—	—	—
1975–76	Kansas City Scouts	NHL	31	1	9	10	6	—	—	—	—	—
1975–76	New Haven Nighthawks	AHL	26	12	16	28	14	3	1	0	1	0
CHL totals			273	69	124	193	229	24	9	7	16	17
NHL totals			259	40	101	141	72	19	2	3	5	2
