= Bob Boucher (ice hockey) =

Canadian ice hockey player and coach

- Born: March 23, 1938 Ottawa, Ontario, Canada
- Died: December 16, 2004 (aged 66) Kemptville, Ontario, Canada
- EHL team: Greensboro Generals
- Played for: Hull-Ottawa Canadiens; Jersey Devils

Robert "Bob" Boucher (March 23, 1938 – December 16, 2004) was a Canadian ice hockey player and coach.

== Career ==
Boucher is best known for coaching the Saint Mary's Huskies for 13 years, leading the Huskies to four straight national championship games. He served as an assistant coach of the Philadelphia Flyers for two seasons under head coach Pat Quinn. He died of lung cancer at age 66 after a short illness.
