= J. C. Tremblay =

Canadian ice hockey player (1939–1994)

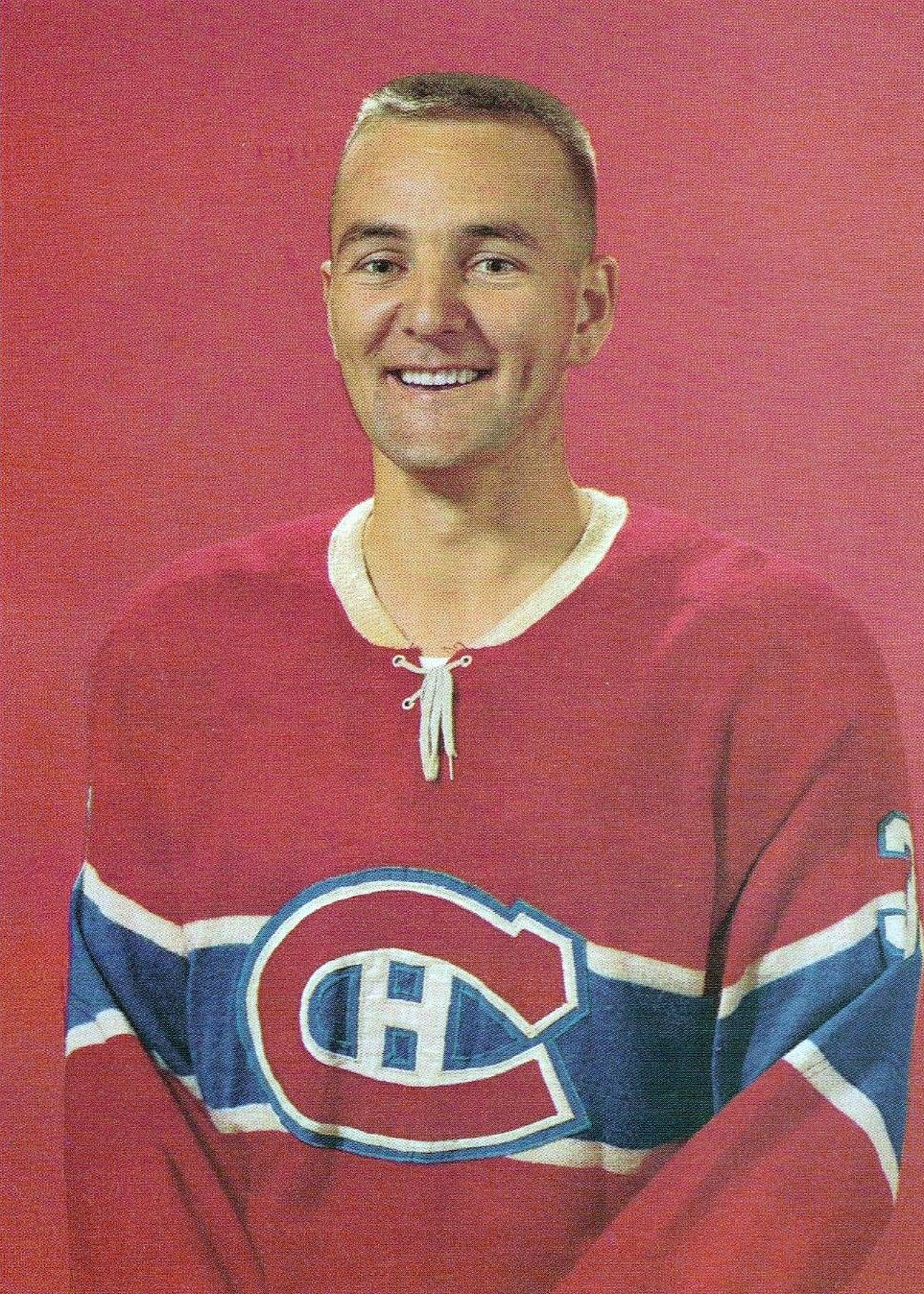
- Tremblay with the Montreal Canadiens, c. 1963
- Born: January 22, 1939 Bagotville, Quebec, Canada
- Died: December 7, 1994 (aged 55) Montreal, Quebec, Canada
- Height: 5 ft 11 in (180 cm)
- Weight: 170 lb (77 kg; 12 st 2 lb)
- Position: Defence
- Shot: Left
- Played for: Montreal Canadiens; Quebec Nordiques
- National team: Canada
- Playing career: 1958–1979

Joseph Henri Jean-Claude Tremblay (trawm-BLAY; January 22, 1939 – December 7, 1994) was a Canadian professional ice hockey defenceman for the Montreal Canadiens of the National Hockey League (NHL) and the Quebec Nordiques of the World Hockey Association (WHA), notable for playmaking and defensive skills.

== Playing career ==
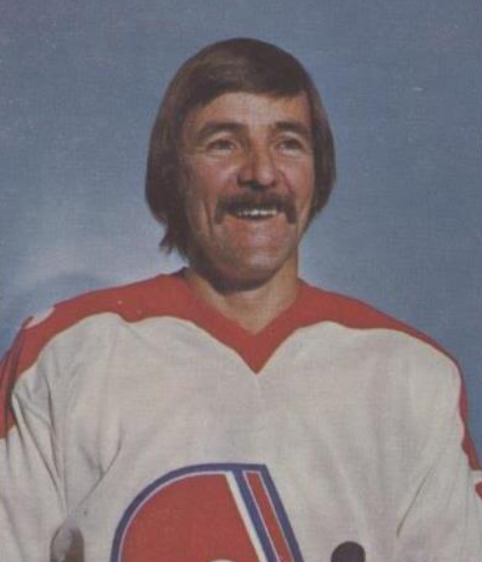
Tremblay with the Quebec Nordiques, c. 1975.

After an amateur and minor professional career that saw him move from playing as left winger to defenceman and win the league most valuable player title in 1960, Tremblay began play for the Montreal Canadiens of the National Hockey League (NHL) in the 1959–60 season and became a regular player for Montreal in the 1961–62 season, playing for five Stanley Cup-winning teams. He became one of the NHL's preeminent stars on defence for both his offense and defensive work, playing in seven NHL All-Star Games and setting the franchise record for points by a defenceman, and was recognized as a first team All-Star in 1970–71 and a second team All-Star in 1967–68 seasons.

For the 1972–73 season, Tremblay jumped to the upstart World Hockey Association (WHA) with the Quebec Nordiques, which had negotiated with the Los Angeles Sharks for his rights. By doing this, he lost his spot on team Canada in the 1972 Summit Series, although he would later be named to the Team Canada roster for the 1974 Summit Series against the Soviet Union men's national ice hockey team. He later considered the first season in the WHA the greatest thrill in his career. He was the Nordiques franchise's first great star, as well as the league's first great defenceman, winning the league honours for best defenceman in 1972–73 and 1974–75 seasons and being named to the WHA's Team Canada in 1973–74, leading that club in defensive scoring. He led the league in assists in 1973 and 1976. Tremblay also led his team to the 1977 AVCO World Trophy championship. He was the only player to play for the Nordiques' all seven seasons in the WHA and retired after the 1978–79 season. He played in 454 games and scored 66 goals and 358 assists for 424 points. His number 3 jersey was retired by the Nordiques after that season just before the franchise's move into the NHL, thus gaining Tremblay the distinction of being one of only three players to have a number retired by an NHL team without ever actually playing for it (the other two being Johnny McKenzie by the Hartford Whalers and Frank Finnigan by the modern-day Ottawa Senators). He later scouted in Europe for the Montreal Canadiens.

In 1977, he lost a kidney to a tumor. Tremblay died of kidney cancer on December 7, 1994, at the age of 55.

== Honours and achievements ==
- Stanley Cup champion: 1965, 1966, 1968, 1969, 1971
- Avco World Trophy: 1977
- NHL All-Star Game: 1959 (Note: At the time, the All-Star Game pitted the Stanley Cup champion against a select group of All-Stars just before the start of a season, and Tremblay played in the game as part of the defending Stanley Cup champion team), 1965, 1967, 1968, 1969, 1971 and 1972
- Dennis A. Murphy Trophy: 1973, 1975
- WHA First All-Star team: 1973, 1975, 1976
- WHA Second All-Star Team: 1974
- NHL First All-Star Team: 1971
- NHL Second All-Star Team: 1968

== Legacy ==
At the time of leaving the Montreal Canadiens, he was 45th all-time for assists in the National Hockey League. For players listed in his position, he was 12th in points. He finished second in WHA history in assists, 14th in points, and 16th in games played. In Quebec, Tremblay had a street named after him in Vaudreuil-Dorion and an arena in La Baie (now part of the City of Saguenay). He was elected as an inaugural member to the World Hockey Association Hall of Fame in 2010.

== Career statistics ==
=== Regular season and playoffs ===
| | | | Regular season | | | | | Playoffs |
| Season | Team | League | GP | G | A | Pts | PIM | GP | G | A | Pts | PIM |
|---|---|---|---|---|---|---|---|---|---|---|---|---|
| 1957–58 | Hull-Ottawa Canadiens | OHA-Jr. | 24 | 7 | 12 | 19 | 8 | — | — | — | — | — |
| 1957–58 | Hull-Ottawa Canadiens | EOHL | 34 | 5 | 17 | 22 | 16 | — | — | — | — | — |
| 1957–58 | Hull-Ottawa Canadiens | M-Cup | — | — | — | — | — | 13 | 2 | 5 | 7 | 10 |
| 1958–59 | Hull-Ottawa Canadiens | EOHL | 26 | 4 | 13 | 17 | 22 | 1 | 0 | 1 | 1 | 9 |
| 1958–59 | Buffalo Bisons | AHL | 3 | 0 | 0 | 0 | 0 | — | — | — | — | — |
| 1958–59 | Hull-Ottawa Canadiens | M-Cup | — | — | — | — | — | 9 | 4 | 5 | 9 | 12 |
| 1959–60 | Montreal Canadiens | NHL | 11 | 0 | 1 | 1 | 0 | — | — | — | — | — |
| 1959–60 | Hull-Ottawa Canadiens | EPHL | 55 | 25 | 31 | 56 | 55 | 7 | 1 | 4 | 5 | 2 |
| 1960–61 | Montreal Canadiens | NHL | 30 | 1 | 3 | 4 | 18 | 5 | 0 | 0 | 0 | 2 |
| 1960–61 | Hull-Ottawa Canadiens | EPHL | 37 | 7 | 33 | 40 | 28 | — | — | — | — | — |
| 1961–62 | Montreal Canadiens | NHL | 70 | 3 | 17 | 20 | 18 | 6 | 0 | 2 | 2 | 2 |
| 1962–63 | Montreal Canadiens | NHL | 69 | 1 | 17 | 18 | 10 | 5 | 0 | 0 | 0 | 0 |
| 1963–64 | Montreal Canadiens | NHL | 70 | 5 | 16 | 21 | 24 | 7 | 2 | 1 | 3 | 9 |
| 1964–65 | Montreal Canadiens | NHL | 68 | 3 | 17 | 20 | 22 | 13 | 1 | 9 | 10 | 18 |
| 1965–66 | Montreal Canadiens | NHL | 60 | 6 | 29 | 35 | 10 | 10 | 2 | 9 | 11 | 2 |
| 1966–67 | Montreal Canadiens | NHL | 60 | 8 | 26 | 34 | 14 | 10 | 2 | 4 | 6 | 2 |
| 1967–68 | Montreal Canadiens | NHL | 73 | 4 | 26 | 30 | 18 | 13 | 3 | 6 | 9 | 2 |
| 1968–69 | Montreal Canadiens | NHL | 75 | 7 | 32 | 39 | 18 | 13 | 1 | 4 | 5 | 6 |
| 1969–70 | Montreal Canadiens | NHL | 58 | 2 | 19 | 21 | 7 | — | — | — | — | — |
| 1970–71 | Montreal Canadiens | NHL | 76 | 11 | 52 | 63 | 23 | 20 | 3 | 14 | 17 | 15 |
| 1971–72 | Montreal Canadiens | NHL | 76 | 6 | 51 | 57 | 24 | 6 | 0 | 2 | 2 | 0 |
| 1972–73 | Quebec Nordiques | WHA | 75 | 14 | 75 | 89 | 32 | — | — | — | — | — |
| 1973–74 | Quebec Nordiques | WHA | 68 | 9 | 44 | 53 | 10 | — | — | — | — | — |
| 1974–75 | Quebec Nordiques | WHA | 68 | 16 | 56 | 72 | 18 | 11 | 0 | 10 | 10 | 2 |
| 1975–76 | Quebec Nordiques | WHA | 80 | 12 | 77 | 89 | 16 | 5 | 0 | 3 | 3 | 0 |
| 1976–77 | Quebec Nordiques | WHA | 53 | 4 | 31 | 35 | 16 | 17 | 2 | 9 | 11 | 2 |
| 1977–78 | Quebec Nordiques | WHA | 54 | 5 | 37 | 42 | 26 | 1 | 0 | 1 | 1 | 0 |
| 1978–79 | Quebec Nordiques | WHA | 56 | 6 | 38 | 44 | 8 | — | — | — | — | — |
| NHL totals | | | 796 | 57 | 306 | 363 | 206 | 108 | 14 | 51 | 65 | 58 |
| WHA totals | | | 454 | 66 | 358 | 424 | 126 | 34 | 2 | 23 | 25 | 4 |
