= 1950 Memorial Cup =

Canadian junior ice hockey championship

The Memorial Cup trophy

The 1950 Memorial Cup final was the 32nd junior ice hockey championship of the Canadian Amateur Hockey Association. The George Richardson Memorial Trophy champions Montreal Junior Canadiens of the Quebec Junior Hockey League in Eastern Canada competed against the Abbott Cup champions Regina Pats of the Western Canada Junior Hockey League in Western Canada. In a best-of-seven series, held at the Montreal Forum in Montreal, Quebec and Maple Leaf Gardens in Toronto, Ontario, Montreal won its first Memorial Cup, defeating Regina 4 games to 1.

== Scores ==
- Game 1: Montreal 8–7 Regina (in Montreal)
- Game 2: Montreal 5–2 Regina (in Montreal)
- Game 3: Montreal 5–1 Regina (in Toronto)
- Game 4: Regina 7–4 Montreal (in Toronto)
- Game 5: Montreal 6–3 Regina (in Montreal)

== Winning roster ==
Doug Binning, Kevin Conway, Bob Dawson, Herb English, Bill Goold, Reg Grigg, Charles Hodge, Gordon Hollingworth, Don Marshall, Dave McCready, Brian McKay, Dickie Moore, Roger Morrissette, Bill Sinnett, Ernie Roche, Kevin Rochford, Art Rose. Coaches: Sam Pollock, Bill Reay.
