= Dave Reid (ice hockey, born 1934) =

Canadian ice hockey player (1934–2021)

- Born: January 11, 1934; Toronto, Ontario, Canada
- Died: June 8, 2021 (aged 87); Nanaimo, British Columbia, Canada
- Height: 6 ft 2 in (188 cm)
- Weight: 180 lb (82 kg; 12 st 12 lb)
- Position: Centre
- Shot: Left
- Played for: Toronto Maple Leafs (NHL)
- Playing career: 1952–1957

David Sidney Reid (January 11, 1934 – June 8, 2021) was a Canadian professional ice hockey player. He played seven games in the National Hockey League, over three seasons (1952–53 to 1955–56), with the Toronto Maple Leafs.

== Career statistics ==
=== Regular season and playoffs ===
| | | | Regular season | | | | | Playoffs |
| Season | Team | League | GP | G | A | Pts | PIM | GP | G | A | Pts | PIM |
|---|---|---|---|---|---|---|---|---|---|---|---|---|
| 1951–52 | Toronto Marlboros | OHA | 3 | 2 | 2 | 4 | 0 | — | — | — | — | — |
| 1951–52 | Weston Dukes | MetJBHL | — | — | — | — | — | — | — | — | — | — |
| 1952–53 | Toronto Maple Leafs | NHL | 2 | 0 | 0 | 0 | 0 | — | — | — | — | — |
| 1952–53 | Toronto Marlboros | OHA | 52 | 12 | 19 | 31 | 29 | 7 | 0 | 1 | 1 | 4 |
| 1953–54 | Toronto Marlboros | OHA | 59 | 22 | 31 | 53 | 38 | 15 | 8 | 11 | 19 | 4 |
| 1954–55 | Toronto Maple Leafs | NHL | 1 | 0 | 0 | 0 | 0 | — | — | — | — | — |
| 1954–55 | University of Toronto | CIAUC | 12 | 17 | 10 | 27 | — | — | — | — | — | — |
| 1955–56 | Toronto Maple Leafs | NHL | 4 | 0 | 0 | 0 | 0 | — | — | — | — | — |
| 1955–56 | University of Toronto | OQAA | 12 | 17 | 10 | 27 | — | — | — | — | — | — |
| 1956–57 | Hull-Ottawa Canadiens | QSHL | 15 | 4 | 1 | 5 | 2 | — | — | — | — | — |
| 1956–57 | Hull-Ottawa Canadiens | EOHL | 12 | 8 | 5 | 13 | 6 | — | — | — | — | — |
| NHL totals | | | 7 | 0 | 0 | 0 | — | — | — | — | — | — |
