= Guy Dufour (ice hockey) =

Canadian ice hockey player

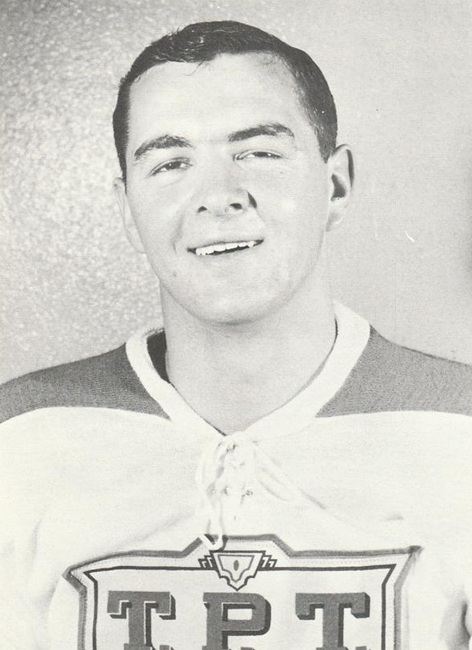
- Dufour in 1965-66 card for Peterborough Petes
- Born: February 9, 1946 (age 80) La Tuque, Quebec, Canada
- Height: 5 ft 11 in (180 cm)
- Weight: 160 lb (73 kg; 11 st 6 lb)
- Position: Forward
- Shot: Right
- Played for: Quebec Nordiques (WHA)
- Playing career: 1966–1975

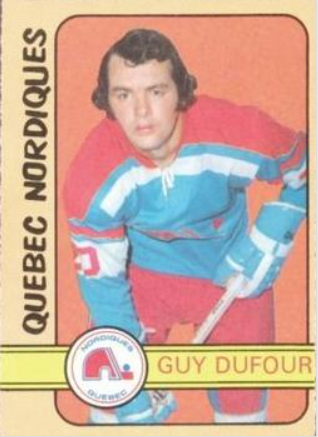
1972-73 OPC card of Dufour for Quebec Nordiques

Guy Dufour (born February 9, 1946) is a Canadian retired professional ice hockey forward who played 83 games in the World Hockey Association (WHA) with the Quebec Nordiques over parts of two seasons.

== Career statistics ==
=== Regular season and playoffs ===
			Regular season					Playoffs
Season	Team	League	GP	G	A	Pts	PIM	GP	G	A	Pts	PIM
1962–63	Quebec Citadelles	QPJHL	––	34	57	91	126	—	—	—	—	—
1963–64	Montreal Junior Canadiens	OHA	3	0	0	0	0	—	—	—	—	—
1964–65	Quebec Aces	AHL	1	0	0	0	0	—	—	—	—	—
1965–66	Peterborough Petes	OHA	48	15	20	35	81	—	—	—	—	—
1966–67	Muskegon Mohawks	IHL	60	17	33	50	67	—	—	—	—	—
1968–69	Quebec Aces	AHL	71	37	15	52	49	15	6	6	12	4
1969–70	Quebec Aces	AHL	45	17	7	24	14	6	1	2	3	4
1970–71	Providence Reds	AHL	37	14	14	28	12	10	2	2	4	6
1970–71	Phoenix Roadrunners	WHL	14	2	4	6	2	—	—	—	—	—
1971–72	Syracuse–Roanoke	EHL	54	17	30	47	14	—	—	—	—	—
1972–73	Quebec Nordiques	WHA	9	3	2	5	2	—	—	—	—	—
1973–74	Quebec Nordiques	WHA	74	27	23	50	30	—	—	—	—	—
1974–75	Cape Codders	NAHL	51	32	25	57	40	—	—	—	—	—
WHA totals			83	30	25	55	32	—	—	—	—	—
