= Bob Lemieux =

Canadian ice hockey player and coach (1944–2025)

- Born: December 16, 1944 Rochester, New York, U.S.
- Died: May 9, 2025 (aged 80) Portage, Michigan, U.S.
- Height: 6 ft 1 in (185 cm)
- Weight: 195 lb (88 kg; 13 st 13 lb)
- Position: Defenceman
- Shot: Left
- Played for: Oakland Seals
- Playing career: 1965–1970

Robert Lemieux (December 16, 1944 – May 9, 2025) was a Canadian professional ice hockey defenceman and coach. He played 19 games for the Oakland Seals of the National Hockey League (NHL) in 1967–68. He was a First Team All-Star and was named the top defenceman of the International Hockey League in 1965–66 while playing with the Muskegon Zephyrs. He played three seasons with the Western Hockey League's Vancouver Canucks before retiring in 1970. After retiring he coached in the minor leagues for several years, finishing in 1978. He died in Portage, Michigan on May 9, 2025, at the age of 80.

== Career statistics ==
=== Regular season and playoffs ===
			Regular season					Playoffs
Season	Team	League	GP	G	A	Pts	PIM	GP	G	A	Pts	PIM
1962–63	Montreal Junior Canadiens	OHA	50	5	12	17	135	10	4	1	5	24
1962–63	Hull-Ottawa Canadiens	EPHL	1	0	0	0	0	—	—	—	—	—
1963–64	Montreal Junior Canadiens	OHA	56	7	33	40	219	17	2	8	10	58
1964–65	Montreal Junior Canadiens	OHA	52	3	20	33	132	7	0	1	1	12
1965–66	Houston Apollos	CHL	2	0	0	0	2	—	—	—	—	—
1965–66	Muskegon Zephyrs	IHL	70	14	44	58	199	4	0	2	2	24
1966–67	Seattle Totems	WHL	72	10	13	23	117	10	2	2	4	14
1967–68	Oakland Seals	NHL	19	0	1	1	12	—	—	—	—	—
1967–68	Vancouver Canucks	WHL	44	10	21	31	70	—	—	—	—	—
1968–69	Vancouver Canucks	WHL	65	3	12	15	115	7	0	2	2	4
1969–70	Vancouver Canucks	WHL	59	7	10	17	62	11	1	0	1	2
NHL totals			19	0	1	1	12	—	—	—	—	—
