= Ernie Roche =

Canadian ice hockey player

- Born: February 4, 1930 Montreal, Quebec, Canada
- Died: January 2, 1988 (aged 57) Montreal, Quebec, Canada
- Height: 6 ft 1 in (185 cm)
- Weight: 170 lb (77 kg; 12 st 2 lb)
- Position: Defense
- Caught: Left
- Played for: Montreal Canadiens
- Playing career: 1950–1961

Ernest Charles Roche (February 4, 1930 – January 2, 1988) was a Canadian professional ice hockey defenceman. He played four games in the National Hockey League for the Montreal Canadiens during the 1950–51 season. The rest of his career, which lasted from 1950 to 1961, was spent in the minor leagues for numerous teams, including the Vancouver Canucks and the Montreal Royals.

== Career statistics ==
=== Regular season and playoffs ===
			Regular season					Playoffs
Season	Team	League	GP	G	A	Pts	PIM	GP	G	A	Pts	PIM
1946–47	Montreal Junior Canadiens	QJAHA	27	3	9	12	52	8	2	9	11	14
1946–47	Montreal Junior Canadiens	M-Cup	—	—	—	—	—	8	1	6	7	16
1947–48	Montreal Junior Canadiens	QJAHA	32	9	10	19	68	5	0	0	0	6
1948–49	Montreal Junior Canadiens	QJAHA	48	11	12	33	73	4	1	1	2	2
1949–50	Montreal Junior Canadiens	QJHL	36	12	12	24	81	15	5	13	18	26
1949–50	Montreal Junior Canadiens	M-Cup	—	—	—	—	—	13	1	10	11	30
1950–51	Montreal Canadiens	NHL	4	0	0	0	2	—	—	—	—	—
1950–51	Cincinnati Mohawks	AHL	60	3	10	13	21	—	—	—	—	—
1951–52	Buffalo Bisons	AHL	4	0	1	1	2	—	—	—	—	—
1951–52	Vancouver Canucks	PCHL	64	6	17	23	60	10	0	1	1	4
1952–53	Vancouver Canucks	WHL	65	10	25	35	69	—	—	—	—	—
1953–54	Montreal Royals	QSHL	51	1	15	16	48	9	2	1	3	4
1953–54	Vancouver Canucks	WHL	5	0	0	0	4	—	—	—	—	—
1954–55	Montreal Royals	QSHL	56	11	11	22	52	14	1	4	5	14
1955–56	Springfield Indians	AHL	22	3	5	8	10	—	—	—	—	—
1955–56	Shawinigan Falls Cataractes	QSHL	24	2	8	10	10	11	0	1	1	4
1956–57	Montreal Royals	QSHL	64	4	21	25	66	4	0	0	0	0
1956–57	Hull-Ottawa Canadiens	EOHL	1	0	0	0	0	—	—	—	—	—
1957–58	Montreal Royals	QSHL	53	5	15	20	40	7	1	1	2	2
1958–59	Montreal Royals	QSHL	51	1	8	9	16	3	0	0	0	0
1959–60	Sudbury Wolves	EPHL	62	4	29	33	38	14	2	3	5	22
1960–61	Sudbury Wolves	EPHL	5	0	2	2	2	—	—	—	—	—
1960–61	Milwaukee Falcons	IHL	10	2	0	2	4	—	—	—	—	—
1960–61	Windsor Maple Leafs	NSSHL	22	4	6	10	6	10	0	0	0	4
QSHL totals			299	24	78	102	232	48	4	7	11	24
NHL totals			4	0	0	0	2	—	—	—	—	—
