= 18th National Hockey League All-Star Game =

Professional ice hockey exhibition game

18th NHL All-Star Game
	1	2	3	Total
All-Stars	0	2	1	3
Toronto Maple Leafs	0	1	1	2
- Date: October 10, 1964
- Arena: Maple Leaf Gardens
- City: Toronto
- MVP: Jean Beliveau (Montreal)
- Attendance: 14,232

The 18th National Hockey League All-Star Game took place at Maple Leaf Gardens on October 10, 1964. The NHL All-Stars defeated the hometown Toronto Maple Leafs 3–2.

== All-Star uniforms ==
The unusual shoulder loops introduced to the All-Star jerseys in 1960 gave way to more traditional striping. The shoulder yoke featured a thin orange-black-orange stripe on the front and back, and the sleeves and waist featured a pair of orange-black-orange stripes. The ends of the sleeves and waistline were black. The orange tie-up collar from the previous set remained, and the two large orange stars outlined in black on the front of the jersey were matched with another pair of stars on the back. The player numbers on the front and back of the jersey were displayed in plain black block numbers. The jerseys would continue to be used through the 1970 game - the league would actually continue to reuse the actual game jerseys year after year until they needed to be replaced.

== The game ==
Both Johnny Bower of the Toronto Maple Leafs and the All-Stars' Glenn Hall of the Chicago Black Hawks were unbeatable through the first half of the game. However, in the second half, the All-Stars managed to put three pucks behind Terry Sawchuk while the Leafs could only score twice on Charlie Hodge of the Montreal Canadiens. Montreal's Jean Béliveau scored the go-ahead goal, on assists from Chicago's Bobby Hull and Gordie Howe of the Detroit Red Wings, late in the second period. Murray Oliver of the Boston Bruins and Jim Pappin of the Leafs traded goals in the third. Hodge became the first goaltender to be penalized in the eighteen-year history of the All-Star game when he was whistled down in the second period for holding the puck.

=== Game summary ===
	Toronto Maple Leafs	All-Stars
Final score	2	3
Scoring summary	Douglas (Bathgate, Mahovlich) 11:45 second (power-play); Pappin (Ehman) 13:35 third	Boivin (Laperriere, Oliver) 10:47 second; Beliveau (Hull, Howe) 13:52 second; Oliver (Bucyk, Howell) 6:11 third
Penalties	Bathgate 1:05 first; Baun 15:38 first; Douglas 17:42 first; Baun 9:43 second; Stewart 5:43 third; Douglas 8:35 third	Howell 7:25 first; Oliver 17:42 first; Laperriere 2:27 second; Mikita 9:43 second; Howell 11:03 second; Hodge 15:33 second (served by Gilbert); Pilote 5:43 third; Provost 10:51 third
Loss/Win	Terry Sawchuk	Charlie Hodge

Shots on goal
Toronto	8	8	12	28
All-Stars	9	14	9	32

- Referee: John Ashley
- Linesmen: Neil Armstrong and Matt Pavelich
- Attendance: 14,232

== Rosters ==
	Toronto Maple Leafs	All-Stars
Head coach	Punch Imlach	Sid Abel (Detroit Red Wings)
Lineup	1 - G Johnny Bower; 2 - D Carl Brewer; 7 - D Tim Horton; 8 - RW Gerry Ehman; 9 - RW Andy Bathgate; 10 - C George Armstrong (captain); 11 - RW Ron Ellis; 12 - C Ron Stewart; 14 - C Dave Keon; 15 - LW Bill Harris; 17 - C Don McKenney; 18 - RW Jim Pappin; 19 - D Kent Douglas; 20 - LW Bob Pulford; 21 - D Bobby Baun; 22 - D Larry Hillman; 23 - LW Eddie Shack; 24 - G Terry Sawchuk; 27 - LW Frank Mahovlich	First team All-Stars: 1 - G Glenn Hall (Chicago Black Hawks); 7 - LW Bobby Hull (Chicago Black Hawks); 11 - D Pierre Pilote (Chicago Black Hawks); 21 - C Stan Mikita (Chicago Black Hawks); Second team All-Stars: 2 - D Jacques Laperriere (Montreal Canadiens); 4 - C Jean Beliveau (Montreal Canadiens); 5 - D Elmer Vasko (Chicago Black Hawks); 9 - RW Gordie Howe (Detroit Red Wings); 25 - G Charlie Hodge (Montreal Canadiens); Other players: 3 - D Harry Howell (New York Rangers); 8 - C Norm Ullman (Detroit Red Wings); 10 - LW Alex Delvecchio (Detroit Red Wings); 12 - RW Rod Gilbert (New York Rangers); 15 - C Murray Oliver (Boston Bruins); 16 - RW Claude Provost (Montreal Canadiens); 20 - LW Camille Henry (New York Rangers); 22 - LW Johnny Bucyk (Boston Bruins); 23 - D Leo Boivin (Boston Bruins)
