= Tom Brennan (ice hockey) =

American ice hockey player (1922–2003)

- Born: January 22, 1922 Philadelphia, Pennsylvania, U.S.
- Died: September 27, 2003 (aged 81) Mississauga, Ontario, CAN
- Height: 5 ft 9 in (175 cm)
- Weight: 155 lb (70 kg; 11 st 1 lb)
- Position: Right wing
- Shot: Right
- Played for: Boston Bruins
- Playing career: 1942–1953

Thomas Ernest Brennan (January 22, 1922 – September 27, 2003) was an American professional ice hockey right winger who played twelve National Hockey League (NHL) games over parts of two seasons for the Boston Bruins. He moved to Montreal, Canada at the age of 15 in order to improve his skills. He returned to his native Philadelphia in 1942 where he played one season in the Eastern Hockey League before the Bruins signed him to a major league contract.

== Career statistics ==
=== Regular season and playoffs ===
| | | | Regular season | | | | | Playoffs |
| Season | Team | League | GP | G | A | Pts | PIM | GP | G | A | Pts | PIM |
|---|---|---|---|---|---|---|---|---|---|---|---|---|
| 1937–38 | Montreal Victorias | MCJHL | — | — | — | — | — | — | — | — | — | — |
| 1938–39 | Montreal Victorias | MCJHL | 12 | 11 | 7 | 18 | 15 | 2 | 1 | 1 | 2 | 14 |
| 1939–40 | Montreal Westmount | MCHL | 11 | 9 | 6 | 15 | 7 | 2 | 2 | 0 | 2 | 0 |
| 1940–41 | Montreal Junior Canadiens | QJHL | 10 | 5 | 10 | 15 | 10 | 4 | 6 | 1 | 7 | 0 |
| 1941–42 | Montreal Senior Canadiens | QSHL | 5 | 2 | 0 | 2 | 2 | — | — | — | — | — |
| 1942-43 | Philadelphia Falcons | EAHL | 44 | 34 | 34 | 68 | 28 | 12 | 8 | 6 | 14 | 16 |
| 1943–44 | Boston Bruins | NHL | 11 | 2 | 1 | 3 | 2 | — | — | — | — | — |
| 1943–44 | Boston Olympics | EAHL | 30 | 36 | 25 | 61 | 58 | 11 | 10 | 4 | 14 | 19 |
| 1944–45 | Boston Bruins | NHL | 1 | 0 | 1 | 1 | 0 | — | — | — | — | — |
| 1944–45 | Boston Olympics | EAHL | 46 | 53 | 55 | 108 | 42 | 10 | 13 | 17 | 30 | 15 |
| 1946–47 | Valleyfield Braves | QSHL | 13 | 4 | 2 | 6 | 16 | — | — | — | — | — |
| 1946–47 | Boston Olympics | EAHL | 32 | 15 | 21 | 36 | 35 | 6 | 3 | 3 | 6 | 0 |
| 1947–48 | Boston Olympics | QSHL | 13 | 3 | 4 | 7 | 4 | — | — | — | — | — |
| 1947–48 | Boston Olympics | EAHL | 5 | 3 | 1 | 4 | 2 | — | — | — | — | — |
| 1948–49 | Halifax St. Mary's | MSHL | 49 | 26 | 35 | 61 | 56 | 11 | 6 | 3 | 9 | 0 |
| 1948–49 | Halifax St. Mary's | Al-Cup | — | — | — | — | — | 5 | 1 | 3 | 4 | 12 |
| 1949–50 | Halifax St. Mary's | MSHL | 61 | 23 | 34 | 57 | 12 | 12 | 7 | 8 | 15 | 12 |
| 1949–50 | Boston Olympics | EAHL | 1 | 0 | 0 | 0 | 0 | — | — | — | — | — |
| 1949–50 | Halifax St. Mary's | Al-Cup | — | — | — | — | — | 5 | 0 | 6 | 6 | 4 |
| 1950–51 | Saint John Beavers | MMHL | 53 | 24 | 42 | 66 | 78 | — | — | — | — | — |
| 1951–52 | Saint John Beavers | MMHL | 1 | 0 | 0 | 0 | 0 | — | — | — | — | — |
| 1951–52 | Joliette Cyclones | QPHL | — | — | — | — | — | — | — | — | — | — |
| 1952–53 | Ste-Therese Titans | QPHL | 41 | 19 | 40 | 59 | 0 | — | — | — | — | — |
| EAHL totals | | | 158 | 141 | 136 | 277 | 165 | 39 | 34 | 30 | 64 | 50 |
| NHL totals | | | 12 | 2 | 2 | 4 | 5 | — | — | — | — | — |
