= Terry Gray (ice hockey) =

Canadian ice hockey player (1938–2020)

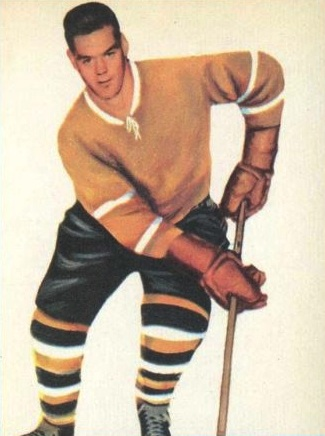
- Born: March 21, 1938; Montreal, Quebec, Canada
- Died: January 2, 2020 (aged 81); Ottawa, Ontario, Canada
- Height: 6 ft 0 in (183 cm)
- Weight: 175 lb (79 kg; 12 st 7 lb)
- Position: Right wing
- Shot: Right
- Played for: Montreal Canadiens; Boston Bruins; Los Angeles Kings; St. Louis Blues
- Playing career: 1956–1974

Terence Stanley Gray (March 21, 1938 – January 2, 2020) was a Canadian professional ice hockey forward who played 147 games in the National Hockey League for the Montreal Canadiens, Boston Bruins, Los Angeles Kings, and St. Louis Blues.

After a brief illness, Gray died on January 2, 2020, in Ottawa, Ontario.

== Career statistics ==
=== Regular season and playoffs ===
			Regular season					Playoffs
Season	Team	League	GP	G	A	Pts	PIM	GP	G	A	Pts	PIM
1953–54	Montreal Junior Royals	QJHL	49	3	4	7	63	4	0	1	1	12
1954–55	Montreal Junior Royals	QJHL	—	—	—	—	—	—	—	—	—	—
1955–56	Montreal Nationale	QJHL	46	45	29	74	33	—	—	—	—	—
1956–57	Montreal Nationale	QJHL	30	30	24	54	59	—	—	—	—	—
1956–57	Hull-Ottawa Canadiens	OHA	1	0	0	0	0	—	—	—	—	—
1956–57	Montreal Royals	QHL	3	1	0	1	0	—	—	—	—	—
1957–58	Hull-Ottawa Canadiens	OHA	24	9	11	20	15	—	—	—	—	—
1957–58	Hull-Ottawa Canadiens	EOHL	33	13	13	26	15	—	—	—	—	—
1957–58	Montreal Royals	QHL	1	0	0	0	0	—	—	—	—	—
1957–58	Hull-Ottawa Canadiens	M-Cup	—	—	—	—	—	13	6	2	8	12
1958–59	Rochester Americans	AHL	45	10	14	24	14	5	1	2	3	2
1958–59	Montreal Royals	QHL	19	11	9	20	33	—	—	—	—	—
1959–60	Calgary Stampeders	WHL	49	20	14	34	29	—	—	—	—	—
1959–60	Sault Ste. Marie Thunderbirds	EPHL	16	4	11	15	19	—	—	—	—	—
1959–60	Buffalo Bisons	AHL	3	0	0	0	0	—	—	—	—	—
1960–61	Hull-Ontario Canadiens	EPHL	69	40	37	77	63	14	8	11	19	13
1961–62	Kingston Frontenacs	EPHL	24	9	11	20	24	9	9	6	15	9
1961–62	Boston Bruins	NHL	42	8	7	15	15	—	—	—	—	—
1962–63	Cleveland Barons	AHL	10	3	5	8	8	—	—	—	—	—
1962–63	Quebec Aces	AHL	58	22	20	42	53	—	—	—	—	—
1963–64	Montreal Canadiens	NHL	4	0	0	0	6	—	—	—	—	—
1963–64	Quebec Aces	AHL	55	25	22	47	65	4	0	1	1	6
1964–65	Quebec Aces	AHL	72	39	28	67	47	5	2	1	3	12
1965–66	Pittsburgh Hornets	AHL	15	5	4	9	10	3	2	0	2	4
1965–66	Quebec Aces	AHL	63	25	29	54	52	—	—	—	—	—
1966–67	Pittsburgh Hornets	AHL	63	25	29	54	52	9	3	4	7	11
1967–68	Los Angeles Kings	NHL	65	12	16	28	22	7	0	2	2	10
1968–69	St. Louis Blues	NHL	8	4	0	4	4	11	3	2	5	8
1968–69	Kansas City Blues	CHL	53	22	28	50	84	—	—	—	—	—
1969–70	St. Louis Blues	NHL	28	2	5	7	17	16	2	1	3	4
1969–70	Kansas City Blues	CHL	22	15	15	30	89	—	—	—	—	—
1970–71	Montreal Voyageurs	AHL	63	24	22	46	78	3	1	1	2	4
1970–71	St. Louis Blues	NHL	—	—	—	—	—	1	0	0	0	0
1972–73	New Haven Nighthawks	AHL	71	25	25	50	40	—	—	—	—	—
1973–74	Fort Worth Wings	CHL	60	18	17	35	30	—	—	—	—	—
AHL totals			518	203	198	401	419	29	9	9	18	39
NHL totals			147	26	28	54	64	35	5	5	10	22
