= André Boudrias =

Canadian ice hockey player (1943–2019)

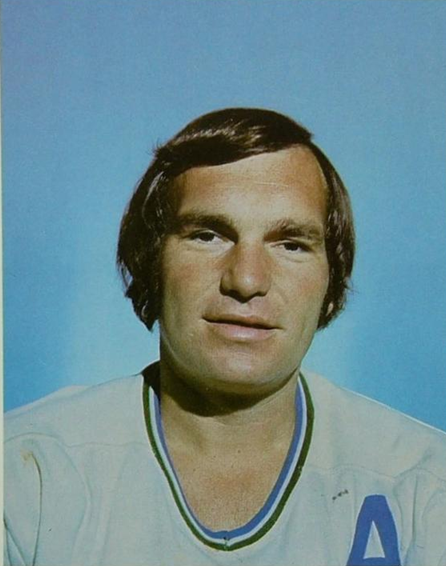
- Born: September 19, 1943 Montreal, Quebec, Canada
- Died: February 5, 2019 (aged 75) Whistler, British Columbia, Canada
- Height: 5 ft 8 in (173 cm)
- Weight: 165 lb (75 kg; 11 st 11 lb)
- Position: Centre
- Shot: Left
- Played for: Montreal Canadiens; Minnesota North Stars; Chicago Black Hawks; St. Louis Blues; Vancouver Canucks; Quebec Nordiques
- Playing career: 1963–1978

André Gerard Boudrias (September 19, 1943 – February 5, 2019) was a Canadian professional ice hockey centre who spent 12 seasons in the National Hockey League (NHL) as well as two more years in the World Hockey Association between 1963 and 1978. He is best remembered for his time with the Vancouver Canucks, where he was the first offensive star in the team's history. He was most recently a scout for the New Jersey Devils.

== Playing career ==
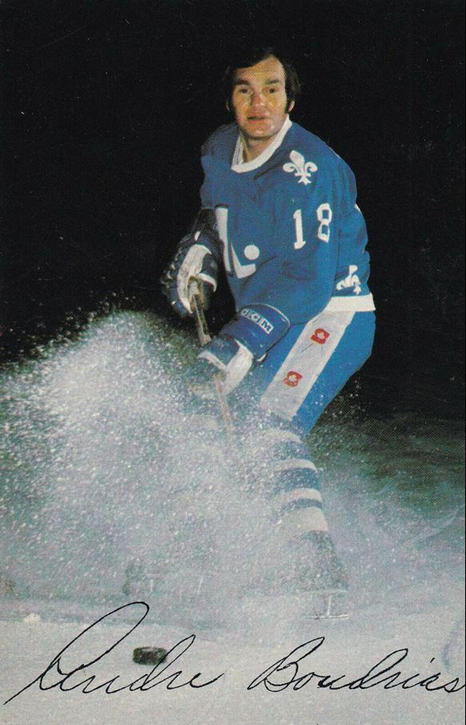
André Boudrias in 1976 postcard for Quebec Nordiques

Boudrias was signed by his hometown Montreal Canadiens at an early age and starred for the Montreal Junior Canadiens between 1961 and 1964. He would twice lead the Jr. Canadiens in scoring, including the 1963–64 team which featured future Hall of Famers Yvan Cournoyer, Jacques Lemaire and Serge Savard. He had an explosive start to his NHL career in a four-game callup during the 1963–64 season, notching 4 assists and 5 points.

When he turned pro in 1964, Boudrias was projected to have a great future for the Canadiens, but his career would stall while former teammates like Cournoyer became stars. He would see just three games of NHL action over the next three seasons, recording a single assist, while buried in the Canadiens' deep farm system.

However, the NHL's expansion in 1967 would prove to be a great opportunity for players like Boudrias, and he was dealt to the Minnesota North Stars on the day of the 1967 Expansion Draft. He would go on to a terrific rookie NHL season in 1967–68, leading the North Stars in assists with 35 and finishing 2nd in points with 53 in their inaugural season. However, he would struggle the following season, posting just 13 points in 53 games. He, along with Mike McMahon was sent to the Chicago Black Hawks for Tom Reid and Bill Orban on February 14, 1969. He would have a strong finish to the season in Chicago, but was lost to the St. Louis Blues in the intra-league draft that summer. Boudrias would endure another disappointing season in St. Louis, as he recorded just 3 goals in 50 games, and was demoted to the minors for 19 games. However, he would notch 6 points in 14 games in helping the Blues to the Stanley Cup Finals, where they would lose on Bobby Orr's famous goal.

Boudrias' career would finally take off when he was dealt to the expansion Vancouver Canucks for the 1970–71 season. He would quickly become the team's top offensive player, leading the team with a career-high 66 points. He would ultimately lead the team in scoring in 4 of their first 5 seasons, and only trailed Bobby Schmautz by a point the other year.

Boudrias would set franchise records for assists and points in 1973–74, and break both his own records in 1974–75. His 62 assists that year remained the franchise record for more than three decades until it was broken by Henrik Sedin in 2006–07. He helped Vancouver to their first-ever playoff appearance in 1975, the only player from the inaugural squad in 1970 to do so.

For the 1975–76 season, Boudrias was named the team's captain, but slumped to his lowest totals as a Canuck, finishing with just 7 goals and 38 points as he began to be used in a more exclusively defensive role.

Now in his mid-30s and with his NHL career on the decline, Boudrias left the Canucks following the 1975–76 season to return closer to home, signing with the Quebec Nordiques of the WHA. He would spend two more successful seasons in Quebec, helping the Nordiques to the WHA Championship with a strong playoff performance in 1977, before retiring in 1978.

Boudrias finished his NHL career with 151 goals and 340 assists for 491 points in 662 games, along with just 216 penalty minutes. He also notched 22 goals and 48 assists for 70 points in 140 WHA games.

== Later life ==
Following his career, Boudrias would go on to become one of the game's most respected scouts with Montreal Canadiens and New Jersey. In 1986, 1993 won the Stanley Cup with Montreal Canadiens as assistant general manager/director of scouting. He then joined New Jersey in summer of 1994. A long-time employee of the New Jersey Devils, Boudrias later served as one of the team's pro scouts and helped build the team which won Stanley Cups in 1995, 2000 and 2003.

Boudrias died on February 5, 2019, at the age of 75.

== Career statistics ==
			Regular season					Playoffs
Season	Team	League	GP	G	A	Pts	PIM	GP	G	A	Pts	PIM
1958–59	Saint-Jérôme Alouettes	MMJHL	—	—	—	—	—	—	—	—	—	—
1959–60	Montreal NDG Monarchs	MMJHL	—	—	—	—	—	—	—	—	—	—
1960–61	Hull Canadiens	IPSHL	—	15	17	32	—	—	—	—	—	—
1960–61	Hull Canadiens	AC	—	—	—	—	—	3	0	0	0	0
1961–62	Montreal Jr. Canadiens	OHA-Jr.	50	34	63	97	54	6	2	3	5	4
1961–62	Hull-Ottawa Canadiens	EPHL	1	0	0	0	0	—	—	—	—	—
1961–62	North Bay Trappers	EPHL	1	0	3	3	2	1	0	0	0	0
1962–63	Montreal Jr. Canadiens	OHA-Jr.	50	12	43	55	72	10	3	4	7	18
1962–63	Hull-Ottawa Canadiens	EPHL	3	0	1	1	0	—	—	—	—	—
1963–64	Montreal Jr. Canadiens	OHA-Jr.	55	38	97	135	48	16	11	26	37	18
1963–64	Montreal Canadiens	NHL	4	1	4	5	2	—	—	—	—	—
1964–65	Montreal Canadiens	NHL	1	0	0	0	2	—	—	—	—	—
1964–65	Quebec Aces	AHL	14	4	9	13	4	—	—	—	—	—
1964–65	Omaha Knights	CPHL	52	15	49	64	10	6	1	7	8	2
1965–66	Quebec Aces	AHL	1	2	0	2	0	—	—	—	—	—
1965–66	Houston Apollos	CPHL	70	27	46	73	53	—	—	—	—	—
1966–67	Montreal Canadiens	NHL	2	0	1	1	0	—	—	—	—	—
1966–67	Houston Apollos	CPHL	67	16	48	64	58	6	1	2	3	6
1967–68	Minnesota North Stars	NHL	74	18	35	53	42	14	3	6	9	8
1968–69	Minnesota North Stars	NHL	53	4	9	13	6	—	—	—	—	—
1968–69	Chicago Black Hawks	NHL	20	4	10	14	4	—	—	—	—	—
1969–70	St. Louis Blues	NHL	50	3	14	17	20	14	2	4	6	4
1969–70	Kansas City Blues	CHL	19	7	16	23	16	—	—	—	—	—
1970–71	Vancouver Canucks	NHL	77	25	41	66	16	—	—	—	—	—
1971–72	Vancouver Canucks	NHL	78	24	37	61	26	—	—	—	—	—
1972–73	Vancouver Canucks	NHL	77	30	40	70	24	—	—	—	—	—
1973–74	Vancouver Canucks	NHL	78	16	59	75	18	—	—	—	—	—
1974–75	Vancouver Canucks	NHL	77	16	62	78	46	5	1	0	1	0
1975–76	Vancouver Canucks	NHL	71	7	31	38	10	1	0	0	0	0
1976–77	Quebec Nordiques	WHA	74	12	31	43	12	17	3	12	15	6
1977–78	Quebec Nordiques	WHA	66	10	17	27	22	11	0	2	2	4
NHL totals			662	151	340	491	216	34	6	10	16	12
CPHL/CHL totals			208	65	159	224	137	12	2	9	11	8
WHA totals			140	22	48	70	34	28	3	14	17	10
AHL totals			15	6	9	15	4	—	—	—	—	—

Preceded by Orland Kurtenbach	Vancouver Canucks captain 1975–76	Succeeded by Chris Oddleifson
