= Bruce Gamble =

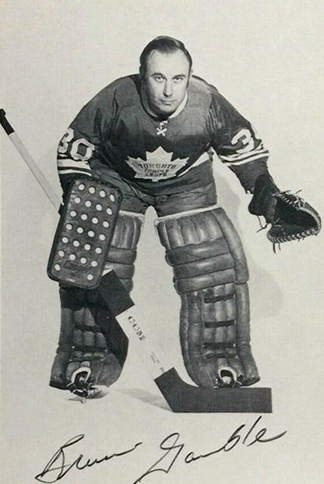
- Gamble in 1970 photo
- Born: May 24, 1938 Port Arthur, Ontario, Canada
- Died: December 29, 1982 (aged 44) Niagara Falls, Ontario, Canada
- Height: 5 ft 9 in (175 cm)
- Weight: 190 lb (86 kg; 13 st 8 lb)
- Position: Goaltender
- Caught: Left
- Played for: New York Rangers; Boston Bruins; Toronto Maple Leafs; Philadelphia Flyers
- Playing career: 1958–1972

Bruce George Gamble (May 24, 1938 – December 29, 1982) was a professional ice hockey goaltender who played in the National Hockey League (NHL) between 1962 and 1972, with some stints in the minor leagues during that time.

== Junior career ==
Gamble played three seasons with the Port Arthur Bruins of the Thunder Bay Junior A Hockey League between 1953 and 1955. In the 1955–56 season, he backstopped the Port Arthur North Stars to a berth in the Memorial Cup. He did so again the following season with the Guelph Biltmores of the Ontario Hockey Association, and was elected to the 1957 OHA first All-Star team. He made it to the Memorial Cup a third time with the Hull-Ottawa Canadiens the following year.

== Professional career and after ==
Gamble played his first year as a pro with the Vancouver Canucks of the WHL, and also played two games in the NHL for the New York Rangers. His performance impressed other NHL teams, and the Boston Bruins chose him in the 1959 intra-league draft. After a year with the Providence Reds in the AHL, Gamble became the team's starting goalie in 1960–61. During the next four seasons he played mainly in the minors with the Portland Buckaroos, Kingston Frontenacs and Springfield Indians, and was called up by the Bruins for 28 games in 1961–62.

Gamble refused to go back to the minors in 1964–65, and so the Bruins suspended him from Springfield for the entire season. The following year he was traded to the Toronto Maple Leafs.

In his first few seasons in Toronto, Gamble was a back-up to Hall of Famers Johnny Bower and Terry Sawchuk. He recorded four shutouts in six games in March 1966. In 1966–67, when the Leafs won the Stanley Cup, he played in 23 regular season games and rang up a record of 5–10–4 and a GAA of 3.39. However, he was sent to the minors to the Tulsa Oilers before the trading deadline; as a result, he did not spend the whole season with Toronto, and his name was left off the Stanley Cup. With the loss of Sawchuk in the 1967 NHL expansion draft, Gamble saw more action with the Leafs and established himself as a solid, workhorse goalie. He played in 41 games in 1967–68, 62 in 1968–69 and 52 in 1969–70. He played in the 1968 NHL All-Star game and was named its Most Valuable Player. He was the last Leaf goalie to play without a mask, finally donning one in 1970-71. Gamble, along with a first-round selection (Pierre Plante) in the 1971 NHL Amateur Draft, was traded to the Philadelphia Flyers for Bernie Parent and a second-round pick (Rick Kehoe) in the same draft as part of a three-way deal which also involved the Boston Bruins on January 31, 1971. The Leafs also sent Mike Walton to the Bruins who shipped Rick MacLeish and Danny Schock to the Flyers.

Gamble served mainly as a back-up to Doug Favell with the Flyers for the rest of that season, appearing in 11 regular season games and two playoff games. The following year, he began to compete for the starting role. He put in a run of solid performances which ended when he suffered a heart attack during a 3–1 victory over the Vancouver Canucks on February 8, 1972. Although he fell at one point during the game, he did not complain of problems until afterward, and traveled with the team to Oakland on February 9 for a game that evening against the California Golden Seals. As his chest pains continued, Gamble was admitted to an Oakland hospital where it was found that he had had a heart attack. Gamble did not play in the NHL again. Apparently, Gamble went missing for a number of years after 1972, with a multiple news stories stating that neither family nor former associates knew where he resided as late as 1979.

On December 29, 1982, after a practice session the evening before with an old-timers hockey team, the Niagara Falls Flames, Gamble woke up with chest pains, and died at a hospital in Niagara Falls, Ontario, at the age of 44.

Gamble was inducted into the Northwestern Ontario Sports Hall of Fame in 1984.

== Urban legends ==
Because Gamble suffered both heart attacks after playing or practising hockey, accounts have been written that he was taken to a hospital during the 1972 NHL game, or that he "died during an old-timers game". Neither of Gamble's heart attacks forced him from the ice; he finished the game after the first attack and suffered the second one the morning after a practice session.

== Career statistics ==
=== Regular season and playoffs ===
			Regular season									Playoffs
Season	Team	League	GP	W	L	T	MIN	GA	SO	GAA	SV%	GP	W	L	MIN	GA	SO	GAA	SV%
1952–53	Port Arthur Bruins	TBJHL	11	—	—	—	660	82	0	7.45	—	—	—	—	—	—	—	—	—
1953–54	Port Arthur Bruins	TBJHL	36	20	15	1	2160	150	0	4.17	—	9	—	—	540	42	0	4.67	—
1954–55	Port Arthur Bruins	TBJHL	—	—	—	—	—	—	—	—	—	—	—	—	—	—	—	—	—
1955–56	Port Arthur North Stars	TBJHL	31	19	10	2	1860	97	0	3.13	—	9	8	1	540	27	0	3.00	—
1955–56	Port Arthur North Stars	MC	—	—	—	—	—	—	—	—	—	13	7	6	800	53	0	4.74	—
1956–57	Guelph Biltmores	OHA	40	—	—	—	2360	102	6	2.59	—	10	—	—	600	34	0	3.40	—
1956–57	Guelph Biltmores	MC	—	—	—	—	—	—	—	—	—	6	1	4	370	28	0	4.54	—
1957–58	Guelph Biltmores	OHA	50	13	32	5	3000	205	1	4.10	—	—	—	—	—	—	—	—	—
1957–58	Providence Reds	AHL	1	1	0	0	60	1	0	1.00	—	—	—	—	—	—	—	—	—
1957–58	Hull-Ottawa Canadiens	MC	—	—	—	—	—	—	—	—	—	13	10	3	610	30	2	2.95	—
1958–59	New York Rangers	NHL	3	0	3	0	180	11	0	3.67	.894	—	—	—	—	—	—	—	—
1958–59	Vancouver Canucks	WHL	65	29	26	10	3900	199	7	3.06	.891	5	2	3	300	11	2	2.20	—
1959–60	Providence Reds	AHL	71	37	32	2	4280	231	4	3.24	—	5	1	4	328	19	0	3.48	—
1960–61	Boston Bruins	NHL	52	12	33	7	3118	193	0	3.71	.892	—	—	—	—	—	—	—	—
1960–61	Providence Reds	AHL	19	6	13	0	1140	85	0	4.47	—	—	—	—	—	—	—	—	—
1961–62	Boston Bruins	NHL	28	6	18	4	1680	121	1	4.32	.879	—	—	—	—	—	—	—	—
1961–62	Portland Buckaroos	WHL	41	28	11	2	2476	108	2	2.62	—	—	—	—	—	—	—	—	—
1962–63	Kingston Frontenacs	EPHL	68	39	18	11	4080	220	1	3.23	—	5	4	1	300	13	1	2.60	—
1963–64	Springfield Indians	AHL	21	5	12	3	1230	80	0	3.90	—	—	—	—	—	—	—	—	—
1965–66	Toronto Maple Leafs	NHL	10	5	2	3	502	21	4	2.51	.925	—	—	—	—	—	—	—	—
1965–66	Tulsa Oilers	CPHL	54	21	24	9	3240	155	4	2.87	—	—	—	—	—	—	—	—	—
1966–67	Toronto Maple Leafs	NHL	23	5	10	5	1181	67	0	3.40	.900	—	—	—	—	—	—	—	—
1966–67	Tulsa Oilers	CPHL	7	2	4	1	420	24	0	3.43	—	—	—	—	—	—	—	—	—
1966–67	Rochester Americans	AHL	5	2	3	0	300	25	0	5.00	—	—	—	—	—	—	—	—	—
1967–68	Toronto Maple Leafs	NHL	41	20	14	2	2194	85	5	2.32	.934	—	—	—	—	—	—	—	—
1968–69	Toronto Maple Leafs	NHL	61	28	20	11	3439	161	3	2.81	.914	3	0	2	86	13	0	9.08	.803
1969–70	Toronto Maple Leafs	NHL	52	19	24	9	3054	156	5	3.06	.915	—	—	—	—	—	—	—	—
1970–71	Toronto Maple Leafs	NHL	23	6	14	1	1280	83	2	3.89	.882	—	—	—	—	—	—	—	—
1970–71	Philadelphia Flyers	NHL	11	3	6	2	658	37	0	3.37	.901	2	0	2	120	12	0	6.01	.821
1971–72	Philadelphia Flyers	NHL	24	7	8	2	1184	58	2	2.94	.912	—	—	—	—	—	—	—	—
NHL totals			328	111	152	46	18,470	993	22	3.23	.906	5	0	4	206	25	0	7.28	.809
