= Charlie Hodge (ice hockey) =

Canadian ice hockey player

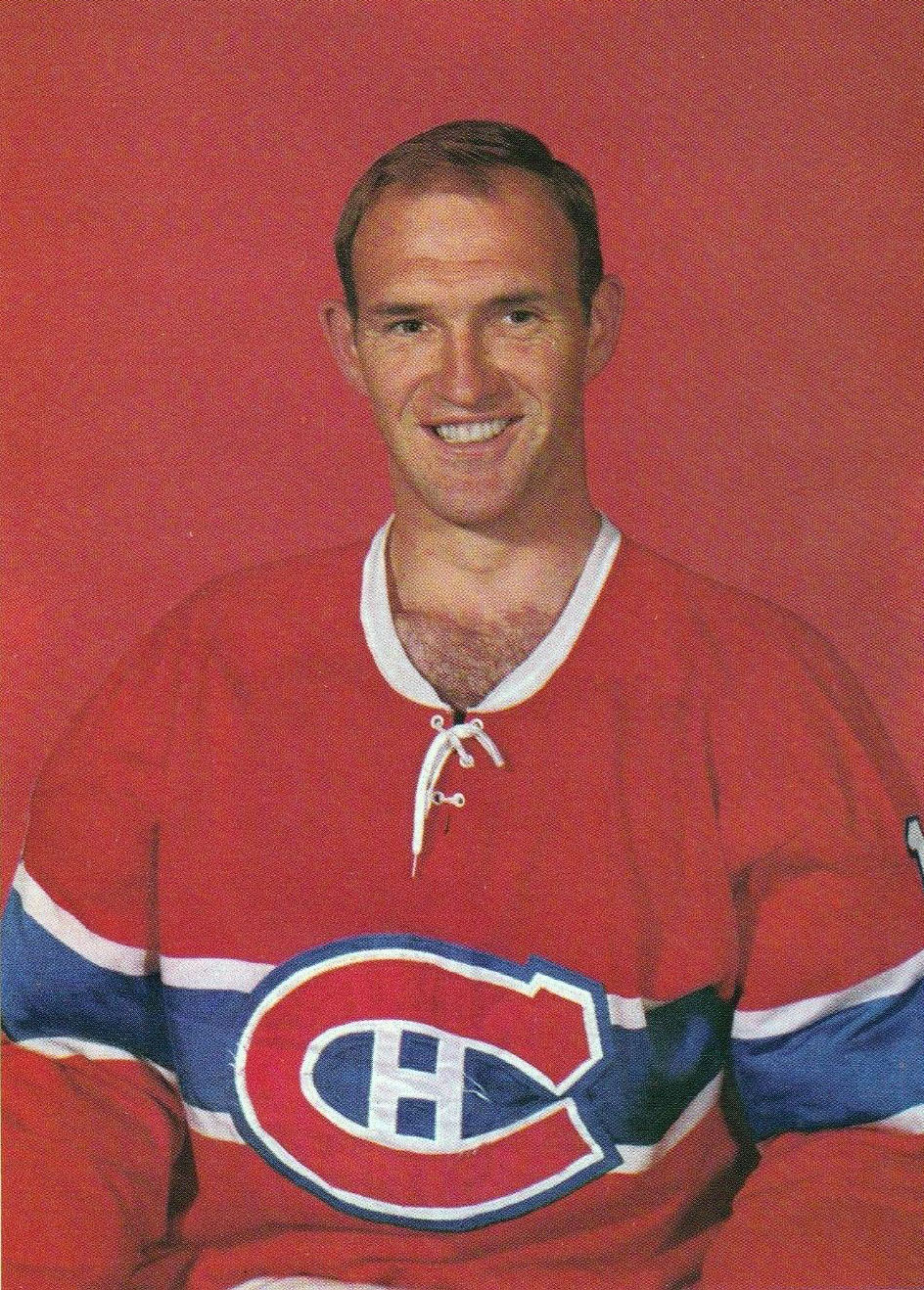
- Hodge with the Montreal Canadiens, c. 1963
- Born: July 28, 1933 Lachine, Quebec, Canada
- Died: April 16, 2016 (aged 82) Vancouver, British Columbia, Canada
- Height: 5 ft 6 in (168 cm)
- Weight: 150 lb (68 kg; 10 st 10 lb)
- Position: Goaltender
- Caught: Left
- Played for: Montreal Canadiens; Oakland Seals; Vancouver Canucks
- Playing career: 1955–1971

Charles Edward Hodge (July 28, 1933 – April 16, 2016) was a Canadian ice hockey player who played as a goaltender for the Montreal Canadiens, Vancouver Canucks, and Oakland Seals of the National Hockey League between 1954 and 1971.

== Early career ==
Charlie Hodge was born in Lachine, Quebec. Hodge was devoted to becoming a member of the Montreal Canadiens. Charlie Hodge began his hockey career with the Montreal Jr. Canadiens in 1950. In 1952, Hodge began showing his true skills finishing with a 2.22 GAA. The next year, he led the Quebec Junior Hockey League with 35 wins and 5 shutouts. Hodge then moved on to the Cincinnati Mohawks in the International Hockey League. There, he led the league in wins and shutouts and helped the Cincinnati Mohawks win the Turner Cup. In the 1954–55 season, he played his first game with the Montreal Canadiens.

== NHL career ==
Hodge's first NHL game occurred in 1954 with Montreal. Because teams in that era only carried one goalie, and Montreal had perhaps the best goalie of the era in Jacques Plante, Hodge was only used in emergency situations. During this time, he played mostly in the American Hockey League. When Plante was traded in 1963, Hodge got his chance to play full-time. He twice won the Vezina Trophy for being the goaltender of the team allowing the fewest goals during the regular season, once outright in 1963–64 and shared with Gump Worsley in 1965–66. Hodge's name appears on the league championship Stanley Cup six times, although he only actually played in one of those finals. He also played one game in the finals in 1955, but lost to Detroit. In 1967, young goaltender Rogatien Vachon was called up by the Canadiens. Vachon played superbly, and there was no more room for Hodge. Hodge was left unprotected in 1967 and he was picked up by the Oakland Seals in the 1967 NHL Expansion Draft.

In Oakland, Hodge earned 13 wins, including 3 shutouts. Next season, he saw his playing time greatly reduced and was sent down to the Western Hockey League where he played for the Vancouver Canucks. Hodge was an expansion pick again when the Vancouver Canucks entered the NHL in 1970. He posted a winning record while sharing netminding duties with George Gardner and Dunc Wilson. He retired after being unable to come to contract terms with General Manager Bud Poile.

== Post-playing career ==
Hodge sold real estate for a decade until Winnipeg Jets GM John Ferguson recruited him for the team's scout in Western Canada.

Hodge thereafter was an amateur scout for the NHL's Tampa Bay Lightning after two decades with the Pittsburgh Penguins. He received Stanley Cup rings with Pittsburgh in 1991 and 1992. He primarily scouted the Vancouver Giants and Chilliwack Bruins of the Western Hockey League and the Lower Mainland clubs in the British Columbia Hockey League.

== Awards and achievements ==
- Turner Cup Championship in 1954.
- Stanley Cup Championship as a goaltender in 1956, 1958, 1959, 1960, 1965, 1966 with Montreal.
- Stanley Cup Champion 1992 as a scout with Pittsburgh.
- Vezina Trophy Winner in 1964 and in 1966 (shared with Gump Worsley).
- Played in 1964, 1965, and 1967 NHL All-Star Games.
- Selected to the NHL Second All-Star Team in 1964 & 1965.

== Career statistics ==
=== Regular season and playoffs ===
			Regular season									Playoffs
Season	Team	League	GP	W	L	T	MIN	GA	SO	GAA	SV%	GP	W	L	MIN	GA	SO	GAA	SV%
1949–50	Montreal Junior Canadiens	QJHL	—	—	—	—	—	—	—	—	—	—	—	—	—	—	—	—	—
1949–50	Montreal Junior Canadiens	M-Cup	—	—	—	—	—	—	—	—	—	2	0	2	122	11	0	5.41	—
1950–51	Montreal Junior Canadiens	QJHL	23	14	8	0	1320	57	1	2.59	—	9	4	5	564	31	0	3.30	—
1951–52	Montreal Junior Canadiens	QJHL	45	32	10	3	2700	100	3	2.22	—	11	9	2	669	19	0	1.70	—
1951–52	Montreal Royals	QMHL	1	0	0	0	40	3	0	4.50	—	—	—	—	—	—	—	—	—
1951–52	Montreal Junior Canadiens	M-Cup	—	—	—	—	—	—	—	—	—	8	4	4	480	32	1	4.00	—
1952–53	Montreal Junior Canadiens	QJHL	44	35	9	0	2640	100	5	2.27	—	7	—	—	560	18	0	2.57	—
1952–53	Montreal Royals	QMHL	1	0	1	0	60	4	0	4.00	—	—	—	—	—	—	—	—	—
1953–54	Cincinnati Mohawks	IHL	62	—	—	—	3720	145	10	2.34	—	11	8	3	660	19	2	1.73	—
1953–54	Buffalo Bisons	AHL	3	2	1	0	180	10	0	3.33	—	—	—	—	—	—	—	—	—
1954–55	Montreal Canadiens	NHL	14	6	4	4	820	31	1	2.27	.918	4	1	2	84	6	0	4.29	.867
1954–55	Providence Reds	AHL	5	3	2	0	300	18	1	3.60	—	—	—	—	—	—	—	—	—
1954–55	Montreal Royals	QHL	35	17	17	1	2100	113	2	3.23	—	—	—	—	—	—	—	—	—
1955–56	Seattle Americans	WHL	70	31	37	2	4245	239	6	3.38	—	—	—	—	—	—	—	—	—
1955–56	Montreal Canadiens	NHL	—	—	—	—	—	—	—	—	—	—	—	—	—	—	—	—	—
1956–57	Rochester Americans	AHL	41	18	18	4	2460	132	2	3.22	—	—	—	—	—	—	—	—	—
1956–57	Shawinigan Cataracts	QHL	14	7	5	2	859	39	2	2.72	—	—	—	—	—	—	—	—	—
1957–58	Montreal Canadiens	NHL	12	8	2	2	720	31	1	2.58	.912	—	—	—	—	—	—	—	—
1957–58	Montreal Royals	QHL	48	23	21	4	2880	153	4	3.19	—	7	2	4	380	25	1	3.95	—
1958–59	Montreal Royals	QHL	24	15	8	1	1440	67	1	2.79	—	2	2	0	120	4	0	2.00	—
1958–59	Rochester Americans	AHL	4	0	4	0	240	12	0	3.00	—	—	—	—	—	—	—	—	—
1958–59	Montreal Canadiens	NHL	2	1	1	0	120	6	0	3.00	.880	—	—	—	—	—	—	—	—
1959–60	Montreal Royals	EPHL	33	15	12	6	1980	96	5	2.91	—	—	—	—	—	—	—	—	—
1959–60	Hull-Ottawa Canadiens	EPHL	26	15	6	5	1560	74	2	2.85	—	7	3	4	430	24	0	3.35	—
1959–60	Montreal Canadiens	NHL	1	0	1	0	60	3	0	3.00	.880	—	—	—	—	—	—	—	—
1960–61	Montreal Canadiens	NHL	30	18	8	4	1800	74	4	2.47	.917	—	—	—	—	—	—	—	—
1960–61	Montreal Royals	EPHL	22	5	13	4	1320	74	0	3.36	—	—	—	—	—	—	—	—	—
1961–62	Quebec Aces	AHL	65	28	33	4	3900	185	5	2.85	—	—	—	—	—	—	—	—	—
1962–63	Quebec Aces	AHL	67	31	25	11	4020	190	4	2.84	—	—	—	—	—	—	—	—	—
1963–64	Montreal Canadiens	NHL	62	33	18	11	3720	140	8	2.26	.920	7	3	4	420	16	1	2.29	.920
1963–64	Quebec Aces	AHL	10	4	6	0	600	32	1	3.20	—	—	—	—	—	—	—	—	—
1964–65	Montreal Canadiens	NHL	53	26	16	10	3180	135	3	2.55	.905	5	3	2	300	10	1	2.00	.925
1965–66	Montreal Canadiens	NHL	26	12	7	2	1301	56	1	2.58	.906	—	—	—	—	—	—	—	—
1966–67	Montreal Canadiens	NHL	37	11	15	7	2055	88	3	2.57	.910	—	—	—	—	—	—	—	—
1967–68	Oakland Seals	NHL	58	13	29	13	3311	158	3	2.86	.905	—	—	—	—	—	—	—	—
1968–69	Oakland Seals	NHL	14	4	6	1	781	48	0	3.69	.881	—	—	—	—	—	—	—	—
1968–69	Vancouver Canucks	WHL	13	7	2	4	779	32	0	2.54	—	8	8	0	497	12	1	1.45	—
1969–70	Oakland Seals	NHL	14	3	5	2	738	43	0	3.50	.891	—	—	—	—	—	—	—	—
1970–71	Vancouver Canucks	NHL	35	15	13	5	1967	112	0	3.42	.892	—	—	—	—	—	—	—	—
AHL totals			195	86	89	19	11,700	567	13	2.91	—	—	—	—	—	—	—	—	—
NHL totals			358	150	125	61	20,753	925	24	2.70	.907	16	7	8	804	32	2	2.39	.915

"Hodge's stats". The Goaltender Home Page.

Preceded by Glenn Hall	Winner of the Vezina Trophy; 1964	Succeeded by Johnny Bower and Terry Sawchuk
Preceded by Johnny Bower and Terry Sawchuk	Winner of the Vezina Trophy with Gump Worsley; 1966	Succeeded by Denis DeJordy and Glenn Hall
