= Hull-Ottawa Canadiens =

The Hull-Ottawa Canadiens were a semi-professional ice hockey franchise from 1959 until 1963.

== History ==
The Hull-Ottawa Canadiens were formed as members of the Eastern Professional Hockey League in 1959. The professional team was granted to the area after the success of a junior/senior mixed squad in the area called the Ottawa-Hull Canadiens, formerly the Montreal Junior Canadiens and junior farm team of the NHL's Montreal Canadiens, relocated to the capital region after the top tier of junior hockey dried up temporarily in Quebec.

With the EPHL entering the market, the Ottawa-Hull Canadiens were relocated by their parent, Montreal Canadiens, to Brockville, Ontario. The EPHL teams lasted for 4 years until the EPHL folded after the 1962-63 season. In the Montreal Canadiens system, the EPHL Canadiens were able to draw up junior players from the Brockville team to fill their roster. The next season when the junior team moved to the Interprovincial Senior Hockey League and relocated to Hull, the EPHL Canadiens were able to draw both junior and senior players from their roster. The most notable being Jacques Laperriere.

Games were played at the Ottawa Auditorium and at the Arena de Hull later renamed the Arena Robert Guertin.

== NHL alumni ==
Hockey Hall of Fame members in bold.

- Bob Armstrong
- Norm Beaudin
- Red Berenson
- Andre Boudrias
- Wayne Connelly
- Bob Courcy
- Claude Cyr
- Norm Dennis
- Germain Gagnon
- Bruce Gamble
- Jean Gauthier
- Terry Gray
- Chuck Hamilton
- Terry Harper
- Charlie Hodge
- Billy Inglis
- Eddie Johnston
- **Jacques Laperriere**
- Claude Larose
- Bob Lemieux
- Al MacNeil
- Cesare Maniago
- Bill Masterton
- Bill McCreary
- Keith McCreary
- Willie O'Ree
- Cliff Pennington
- Garry Peters
- Barclay Plager
- Claude Pronovost
- Dave Reid
- Jim Roberts
- Ernie Roche
- Bobby Rousseau
- **Harry Sinden**
- Glen Skov
- Brian Smith
- Dallas Smith
- Joe Szura
- Gilles Tremblay
- J. C. Tremblay
- Ernie Wakely
- Bryan Watson

== Season records ==
Season	League	Games	Won	Lost	Tied	Points	Pct %	Goals for	Goals against
1959-60	EPHL	70	31	28	11	73	0.521	249	241
1960-61	EPHL	70	41	20	9	91	0.650	268	187
1961-62	EPHL	70	38	21	11	87	0.621	233	172
1962-63	EPHL	72	40	25	7	87	0.604	279	224

== See also ==
- Ice hockey in Ottawa
