= 1961 Allan Cup =

Canadian senior ice hockey championship

The Allan Cup trophy

The 1961 Allan Cup was the Canadian senior ice hockey championship for the 1960–61 senior "A" season. The event was hosted by the Galt Terriers and Galt, Ontario. The 1961 playoff marked the 53rd time that the Allan Cup has been awarded.

== Teams ==
- Galt Terriers (Eastern Canadian Champions)
- Winnipeg Maroons (Western Canadian Champions)

== Playdowns ==
=== Allan Cup Best-of-Seven Series ===
Galt Terriers 4 - Winnipeg Maroons 3 (2OT)
Galt Terriers 3 - Winnipeg Maroons 2
Winnipeg Maroons 2 - Galt Terriers 1
Galt Terriers 4 - Winnipeg Maroons 2
Galt Terriers 5 - Winnipeg Maroons 0

=== Eastern Playdowns ===
Quarter-final

Granby Victorias defeated Hull Canadiens 3-games-to-none

Granby Victorias 2 - Hull Canadiens 1
Granby Victorias 5 - Hull Canadiens 3
Granby Victorias 4 - Hull Canadiens 1

Semi-final

Galt Terriers defeated Rouyn-Noranda Alouettes 3-games-to-none

Galt Terriers 4 - Rouyn-Noranda Alouettes 2
Galt Terriers 5 - Rouyn-Noranda Alouettes 3
Galt Terriers 4 - Rouyn-Noranda Alouettes 3

Amherst Ramblers defeated Granby Victorias 3-games-to-1

Amherst Ramblers 5 - Granby Victorias 3
Granby Victorias 5 - Amherst Ramblers 3
Amherst Ramblers 2 - Granby Victorias 0
Amherst Ramblers 5 - Granby Victorias 1

Final

Galt Terriers defeated Amherst Ramblers 4-games-to-none

Galt Terriers 5 - Amherst Ramblers 4
Galt Terriers 5 - Amherst Ramblers 0
Galt Terriers 4 - Amherst Ramblers 2
Galt Terriers 3 - Amherst Ramblers 2

=== Western Playdowns ===
Quarter-final

Winnipeg Maroons defeated Port Arthur Bearcats 3-games-to-2

Port Arthur Bearcats 4 - Winnipeg Maroons 0
Winnipeg Maroons 3 - Port Arthur Bearcats 2
Port Arthur Bearcats 5 - Winnipeg Maroons 3
Winnipeg Maroons 8 - Port Arthur Bearcats 6
Winnipeg Maroons 4 - Port Arthur Bearcats 0

Semi-final

Winnipeg Maroons defeated Moose Jaw Pla-Mors 3-games-to-1

Winnipeg Maroons 3 - Moose Jaw Pla-Mors 2
Winnipeg Maroons 5 - Moose Jaw Pla-Mors 3
Moose Jaw Pla-Mors 5 - Winnipeg Maroons 2
Winnipeg Maroons 3 - Moose Jaw Pla-Mors 1

Final

Winnipeg Maroons defeated Nelson Maple Leafs 4-games-to-2

Winnipeg Maroons 7 - Nelson Maple Leafs 2
Nelson Maple Leafs 4 - Winnipeg Maroons 3
Winnipeg Maroons 5 - Nelson Maple Leafs 3
Nelson Maple Leafs 3 - Winnipeg Maroons 2
Winnipeg Maroons 4 - Nelson Maple Leafs 0
Winnipeg Maroons 6 - Nelson Maple Leafs 1
