= List of NHL players (S) =

This is a list of National Hockey League (NHL) players who have played at least one game in the NHL from 1917 to present and have a last name that starts with "S".

List updated as of the 2020–21 NHL season.

== Sa ==
- Brandon Saad
- Aleksi Saarela
- Simo Saarinen
- Shaun Sabol
- Bob Sabourin
- Dany Sabourin
- Gary Sabourin
- Ken Sabourin
- Scott Sabourin
- David Sacco
- Joe Sacco
- Larry Sacharuk
- Kirill Safronov
- Rocky Saganiuk
- Joe Sakic
- Alexander Salak
- Ruslan Salei
- Don Saleski
- Anssi Salmela
- Tony Salmelainen
- Borje Salming
- Robin Salo
- Sami Salo
- Tommy Salo
- Miikka Salomaki
- Andreas Salomonsson
- Barry Salovaara
- Bryce Salvador
- Dave Salvian
- Dylan Samberg
- Phil Samis
- Dmitri Samorukov
- Mackie Samoskevich
- Gary Sampson
- Jerome Samson
- Ilya Samsonov
- Sergei Samsonov
- Henrik Samuelsson
- Kjell Samuelsson
- Martin Samuelsson
- Mikael Samuelsson
- Philip Samuelsson
- Ulf Samuelsson
- Scott Sandelin
- Derek Sanderson
- Geoff Sanderson
- Jake Sanderson
- Ed Sandford
- Linus Sandin
- Rasmus Sandin
- Jim Sandlak
- Charlie Sands
- Mike Sands
- Felix Sandstrom
- Tomas Sandstrom
- Terran Sandwith
- Curtis Sanford
- Zach Sanford
- Bobby Sanguinetti
- Travis Sanheim
- Everett Sanipass
- Tommi Santala
- Steven Santini
- Mike Santorelli
- Oleg Saprykin
- Yves Sarault
- Gary Sargent
- Cory Sarich
- Geoff Sarjeant
- Craig Sarner
- Peter Sarno
- Juuse Saros
- Dick Sarrazin
- Fred Sasakamoose
- Grant Sasser
- Miroslav Satan
- Harri Sateri
- Glen Sather
- Kurt Sauer
- Mike Sauer
- Bernie Saunders
- David Saunders
- Teddy Saunders
- Ashton Sautner
- Bob Sauve
- Jean-Francois Sauve
- Maxim Sauve
- Philippe Sauve
- Yann Sauve
- Andre Savage
- Brian Savage
- Gordon "Tony" Savage
- Joel Savage
- Reggie Savage
- Andre Savard
- David Savard
- Denis Savard
- Jean Savard
- Marc Savard
- Serge Savard
- Ryan Savoia
- Matthew Savoie
- Raymond Sawada
- Zachary Sawchenko
- Terry Sawchuk
- Kevin Sawyer

== Sb–Sc ==
- Luca Sbisa
- Peter Scamurra
- Marco Scandella
- Brandon Scanlin
- Dave Scatchard
- Colton Sceviour
- Darin Sceviour
- Joe Schaefer
- Nolan Schaefer
- Paul "Butch" Schaefer
- Peter Schaefer
- Paxton Schafer
- Tim Schaller
- Kevin Schamehorn
- Petr Schastlivy
- Mark Scheifele
- John Schella
- Brayden Schenn
- Luke Schenn
- Nikita Scherbak
- Chuck Scherza
- Cameron Schilling
- Ken Schinkel
- Brad Schlegel
- David Schlemko
- Andy Schliebener
- Jordan Schmaltz
- Nick Schmaltz
- Bobby Schmautz
- Cliff Schmautz
- Akira Schmid
- Chris Schmidt
- Clarence Schmidt
- Jack Schmidt
- Joe "Otto" Schmidt
- Milt Schmidt
- Norm Schmidt
- Robert Schnabel
- Werner Schnarr
- Andy Schneider
- Braden Schneider
- Cole Schneider
- Cory Schneider
- Mathieu Schneider
- Danny Schock
- Ron Schock
- Jim Schoenfeld
- Dwight Schofield
- Wally Schreiber
- Rob Schremp
- David "Sweeney" Schriner
- Jordan Schroeder
- Christoph Schubert
- Corey Schueneman
- Jimmy Schuldt
- Paxton Schulte
- Dave Schultz
- Jeff Schultz
- Jesse Schultz
- Justin Schultz
- Nick Schultz
- Ray Schultz
- M. F. Schurman
- Rod Schutt
- Corey Schwab
- Jaden Schwartz
- Marek Schwarz
- Cole Schwindt
- Scott Scissons
- Enio Sclisizzi
- Ganton Scott
- John Scott
- Laurie Scott
- Richard Scott
- Ron Scott
- Travis Scott
- Darrel Scoville
- Claudio Scremin
- Ben Scrivens
- Howard Scruton
- Rob Scuderi

== Se ==
- Brent Seabrook
- Glen Seabrooke
- Al Secord
- Daniel Sedin
- Henrik Sedin
- Lukas Sedlak
- Ron Sedlbauer
- Nick Seeler
- Steve Seftel
- Brandon Segal
- Dan Seguin
- Steve Seguin
- Tyler Seguin
- Earl Seibert
- Dennis Seidenberg
- Moritz Seider
- Ric Seiling
- Rod Seiling
- Jiri Sejba
- Peter Sejna
- Jiri Sekac
- Andrej Sekera
- Lubomir Sekeras
- Teemu Selanne
- Brit Selby
- Steve Self
- Alexander Selivanov
- Luke Sellars
- Eric Selleck
- Sean Selmser
- Brad Selwood
- Alexander Semak
- Brandy Semchuk
- Dave Semenko
- Alexei Semenov
- Anatoli Semenov
- Alexander Semin
- Kirill Semyonov
- Brett Seney
- George Senick
- Gilles Senn
- Zachary Senyshyn
- Jyrki Seppa
- Ron Serafini
- Mikhail Sergachev
- Jeff Serowik
- George Servinis
- Tim Sestito
- Tom Sestito
- Devin Setoguchi
- Jaroslav Sevcik
- Cam Severson
- Damon Severson
- Brent Severyn
- Pierre Sevigny
- Richard Sevigny
- Ben Sexton
- Dan Sexton

== Sg–Sh ==
- Michael Sgarbossa
- Eddie Shack
- Joe Shack
- Konstantin Shafronov
- Paul Shakes
- Evgeny Shaldybin
- Brendan Shanahan
- Sean Shanahan
- David Shand
- Daniel Shank
- Charles Shannon
- Darrin Shannon
- Darryl Shannon
- Gerry Shannon
- Ryan Shannon
- Jeff Shantz
- Yegor Sharangovich
- Vadim Sharifijanov
- MacGregor Sharp
- Patrick Sharp
- Jeff Sharples
- Scott Sharples
- Glen Sharpley
- Kevin Shattenkirk
- Scott Shaunessy
- Andrew Shaw
- Brad Shaw
- David Shaw
- Logan Shaw
- Mason Shaw
- Normand Shay
- Pat Shea
- Riley Sheahan
- Rob Shearer
- Ryan Shea
- Conor Sheary
- Doug Shedden
- Bobby Sheehan
- Neil Sheehy
- Tim Sheehy
- Jody Shelley
- Doug Shelton
- Hunter Shepard
- Frank Sheppard
- Gregg Sheppard
- James Sheppard
- John Sheppard
- Ray Sheppard
- John Sherf
- Fred Shero
- Gordon "Moose" Sherritt
- Kiefer Sherwood
- Kole Sherwood
- Gord Sherven
- Igor Shesterkin
- Jeff Shevalier
- Jack Shewchuk
- Alex Shibicky
- Allan Shields
- Steve Shields
- Bill Shill
- Jack Shill
- Hunter Shinkaruk
- Brendan Shinnimin
- Rick Shinske
- Vadim Shipachyov
- Jim Shires
- Sergei Shirokov
- Timofei Shishkanov
- Paul Shmyr
- Bruce Shoebottom
- Devin Shore
- Drew Shore
- Eddie Shore
- Hamby Shore
- Nick Shore
- Steve Short
- Mikhail Shtalenkov
- Gary Shuchuk
- Ron Shudra
- Justin Shugg
- Richard Shulmistra
- Steve Shutt
- Denis Shvidki

== Si ==
- Peter Sidorkiewicz
- Albert "Babe" Siebert
- Jonas Siegenthaler
- Patrick Sieloff
- Duncan Siemens
- Jamie Sifers
- Jonathan Sigalet
- Jordan Sigalet
- Mike Siklenka
- Dylan Sikura
- Jakob Silfverberg
- Dave Silk
- Zach Sill
- Cole Sillinger
- Mike Sillinger
- Arturs Silovs
- Mike Siltala
- Risto Siltanen
- Jonathan Sim
- Trevor Sim
- Martin Simard
- Radim Simek
- Roman Simicek
- Charlie Simmer
- Wayne Simmonds
- Al Simmons
- Don Simmons
- Gary Simmons
- Ben Simon
- Chris Simon
- Dominik Simon
- Jason Simon
- John "Cully" Simon
- Thain Simon
- Todd Simon
- Frank Simonetti
- Bobby Simpson
- Cliff Simpson
- Craig Simpson
- Dillon Simpson
- Harold "Joe" Simpson
- Kent Simpson
- Reid Simpson
- Todd Simpson
- Al Sims
- Shane Sims
- Reggie Sinclair
- Alex Singbush
- Ilkka Sinisalo
- Ville Siren
- Bob Sirois
- Mike Sislo
- Colton Sissons
- Darryl Sittler
- Michal Sivek

== Sj–Sl ==
- Lars-Erik Sjoberg
- Tommy Sjodin
- Fredrik Sjostrom
- Bjorn Skaare
- Jarrod Skalde
- Mackenzie Skapski
- Randy Skarda
- Paul Skidmore
- Jack Skille
- Raymie Skilton
- Alf Skinner
- Brett Skinner
- Jeff Skinner
- Larry Skinner
- Stuart Skinner
- Brady Skjei
- Wade Skolney
- Andrei Skopintsev
- Warren Skorodenski
- Martin Skoula
- Glen Skov
- Karlis Skrastins
- Pavel Skrbek
- Petri Skriko
- Rob Skrlac
- Brian Skrudland
- Peter Skudra
- Juraj Slafkovsky
- Landon Slaggert
- John Slaney
- Jim Slater
- Jaccob Slavin
- Josiah Slavin
- John Sleaver
- Jiri Slegr
- Louis Sleigher
- Anton Slepyshev
- Blake Sloan
- Tod Sloan
- Tyler Sloan
- David Sloane
- Peter Slobodian
- Ed Slowinski
- Darryl Sly
- Matt Smaby
- Doug Smail
- Alex Smart
- Dale Smedsmo
- Richard Smehlik
- Jiri Smejkal

== Sm ==
- Ladislav Smid
- Don Smillie
- Alexei Smirnov
- Al Smith
- Alex Smith
- Art Smith
- Barry Smith
- Ben Smith
- Billy Smith
- Bobby Smith
- Brad Smith
- Brandon Smith
- Brendan Smith
- Brian Smith (born 1937)
- Brian Smith (born 1940)
- C. J. Smith
- Carl "Winky" Smith
- Clint Smith
- Cole Smith
- Colin Smith
- Craig Smith
- D. J. Smith
- Dallas Smith
- Dalton Smith
- Dalton "Nakina" Smith
- Dan Smith
- Dennis Smith
- Derek Smith (born 1954)
- Derek Smith (born 1984)
- Derrick Smith
- Des Smith
- Don Smith (born 1887)
- Don Smith (born 1929)
- Doug Smith
- Floyd Smith
- Gary Smith
- Gemel Smith
- Geoff Smith
- George Smith
- Givani Smith
- Glen Smith
- Glenn Smith
- Gord Smith
- Greg Smith
- Jason Smith
- Jeremy Smith
- Kenny Smith
- Mark Smith
- Mike Smith
- Nathan Smith (born 1982)
- Nathan Smith (born 1998)
- Nick Smith
- Normie Smith
- Randy Smith
- Reginald "Hooley" Smith
- Reilly Smith
- Rick Smith
- Rodger Smith
- Ron Smith
- Sid Smith
- Stanford Smith
- Steve Smith (born 1963 in Canada)
- Steve Smith (born 1963 in Scotland)
- Stuart Smith (born 1919)
- Stuart Smith (born 1960)
- Tommy Smith
- Trevor Smith
- Ty Smith
- Vern Smith
- Wayne Smith
- Wyatt Smith
- Zack Smith
- Devante Smith-Pelly
- Jerred Smithson
- Radek Smolenak
- Bryan Smolinski
- Jordan Smotherman
- Peter Smrek
- John Smrke
- Stan Smrke
- Stan Smyl
- Rod Smylie
- Brad Smyth
- Greg Smyth
- Kevin Smyth
- Ryan Smyth

== Sn-Sr ==
- Bob Sneddon
- Carl Sneep
- Chris Snell
- Ron Snell
- Ted Snell
- Harold Snepsts
- Joe Snively
- Garth Snow
- Sandy Snow
- Dave Snuggerud
- Dan Snyder
- Dennis Sobchuk
- Gene Sobchuk
- Vladimir Sobotka
- Carl Soderberg
- Arvid Söderblom
- Elmer Soderblom
- Tommy Soderstrom
- Victor Soderstrom
- Doug Soetaert
- Mads Sogaard
- Egor Sokolov
- Ken Solheim
- Bob Solinger
- Ilya Solovyov
- Art Somers
- Radovan Somik
- Roy Sommer
- Tom Songin
- Glen Sonmor
- Martin Sonnenberg
- Brent Sopel
- Marcus Sorensen
- Nick Sorensen
- Lee Sorochan
- Ilya Sorokin
- John Sorrell
- Nikita Soshnikov
- Carson Soucy
- Christian Soucy
- Sheldon Souray
- Justin Sourdif
- Jaroslav Spacek
- Nick Spaling
- Martin Spanhel
- Garret Sparks
- Emory "Spunk" Sparrow
- Fred Speck
- Bill Speer
- Blake Speers
- Ted Speers
- Gord Spence
- Brian Spencer
- Irv Spencer
- Jordan Spence
- Chris Speyer
- Jason Spezza
- Matthew Spiller
- Red Spooner
- Ryan Spooner
- Corey Spring
- Don Spring
- Frank Spring
- Jesse Spring
- Daniel Sprong
- Ryan Sproul
- Andy Spruce
- Janis Sprukts
- Jared Spurgeon
- Tomas Srsen

== St ==
- Martin St. Amour
- Rick St. Croix
- Frederic St. Denis
- Jack St. Ivany
- Bruno St. Jacques
- Andre St. Laurent
- Dollard St. Laurent
- Sam St. Laurent
- Martin St. Louis
- Frank St. Marseille
- Martin St. Pierre
- Claude St. Sauveur
- Eric Staal
- Jordan Staal
- Marc Staal
- Ron Stackhouse
- Ted Stackhouse
- Drew Stafford
- Garrett Stafford
- Frank "Butch" Stahan
- Steve Staios
- Matthew Stajan
- Nick Stajduhar
- Viktor Stalberg
- Alan "Red" Staley
- Alex Stalock
- Steven Stamkos
- Lorne Stamler
- Rastislav Stana
- George Standing
- Fred Stanfield
- Jack Stanfield
- Jim Stanfield
- Ed Staniowski
- Ed Stankiewicz
- Myron Stankiewicz
- Logan Stankoven
- Allan Stanley
- Barney Stanley
- Daryl Stanley
- Logan Stanley
- Wally Stanowski
- Paul Stanton
- Ryan Stanton
- Brian Stapleton
- Mike Stapleton
- Pat Stapleton
- Tim Stapleton
- Sergei Starikov
- Harold Starr
- Wilfie Starr
- Vic Stasiuk
- Spencer Stastney
- Anton Stastny
- Marian Stastny
- Paul Stastny
- Peter Stastny
- Yan Stastny
- Ray Staszak
- Jaxson Stauber
- Robb Stauber
- Brad Staubitz
- Troy Stecher
- Dave Steckel
- Sam Steel
- Frank Steele
- Alexander Steen
- Anders Steen
- Oskar Steen
- Thomas Steen
- Alex Steeves
- Greg Stefan
- Patrik Stefan
- Morris Stefaniw
- Bud Stefanski
- Phil Stein
- Pete Stemkowski
- Lee Stempniak
- Kevin Stenlund
- Vern Stenlund
- Derek Stepan
- Tobias Stephan
- Charlie Stephens
- Mitchell Stephens
- Bob Stephenson
- Chandler Stephenson
- Shay Stephenson
- Wayne Stephenson
- Brett Sterling
- Ronnie Stern
- Ulf Sterner
- John Stevens
- Kevin Stevens
- Mike Stevens
- Phil Stevens
- Scott Stevens
- Doug Stevenson
- Grant Stevenson
- Jeremy Stevenson
- Shayne Stevenson
- Turner Stevenson
- Alan Stewart
- Anthony Stewart
- Bill Stewart
- Blair Stewart
- Bob Stewart
- Cam Stewart
- Chris Stewart
- Gaye Stewart
- Greg Stewart
- Jack Stewart
- Jim Stewart
- John Stewart (born 1950)
- John Stewart (born 1954)
- Karl Stewart
- Ken Stewart
- Nels Stewart
- Paul Stewart
- Ralph Stewart
- Ron Stewart
- Ryan Stewart
- Trevor Stienburg
- Tony Stiles
- Cory Stillman
- Riley Stillman
- Ryan Stoa
- P. J. Stock
- Jack Stoddard
- Alek Stojanov
- Anthony Stolarz
- Jarret Stoll
- Karl Stollery
- Roland Stoltz
- Mark Stone
- Michael Stone
- Ryan Stone
- Steve Stone
- Clayton Stoner
- Jim Storm
- Jamie Storr
- Zack Stortini
- Mike Stothers
- Blaine Stoughton
- Steve Stoyanovich
- Tyson Strachan
- Neil Strain
- Brian Strait
- Martin Straka
- Petr Straka
- Anton Stralman
- Austin Strand
- Gord Strate
- Art Stratton
- Martin Strbak
- Ben Street
- Mark Streit
- Art Strobel
- Dylan Strome
- Ryan Strome
- Ken Strong
- Garret Stroshein
- Jayden Struble
- David Struch
- Jason Strudwick
- Todd Strueby
- Bill "Red" Stuart
- Brad Stuart
- Colin Stuart
- Mark Stuart
- Mike Stuart
- Marian Studenic
- Jack Studnicka
- Jozef Stumpel
- Bob Stumpf
- Peter Sturgeon
- Marco Sturm
- Nico Sturm
- Mike Stutzel
- Tim Stutzle

== Su ==
- Malcolm Subban
- P. K. Subban
- Radoslav Suchy
- C. J. Suess
- Aleksander Suglobov
- Kai Suikkanen
- Libor Sulak
- Doug Sulliman
- Barry Sullivan
- Bob Sullivan
- Brian Sullivan
- Frank Sullivan
- George "Red" Sullivan
- Mike Sullivan
- Peter Sullivan
- Steve Sullivan
- Alexander Sulzer
- Raimo Summanen
- Bill Summerhill
- Chris Summers
- Niklas Sundblad
- Mats Sundin
- Ronnie Sundin
- Oskar Sundqvist
- Johan Sundstrom
- Niklas Sundstrom
- Patrik Sundstrom
- Peter Sundstrom
- Antti Suomela
- Al Suomi
- Damian Surma
- Tomas Surovy
- Maxim Sushinski
- Maxim Sushko
- Andrej Sustr
- Gary Suter
- Pius Suter
- Ryan Suter
- Brian Sutherby
- Bill Sutherland
- Ron "Max" Sutherland
- Brandon Sutter
- Brent Sutter
- Brian Sutter
- Brody Sutter
- Darryl Sutter
- Duane Sutter
- Rich Sutter
- Ron Sutter
- Andy Sutton
- Ken Sutton
- Mark Suzor
- Nick Suzuki

== Sv–Sz ==
- Per Svartvadet
- Marek Svatos
- Andrei Svechnikov
- Evgeny Svechnikov
- Viktor Svedberg
- Robert Svehla
- Jaroslav Svejkovsky
- Leif Svensson
- Magnus Svensson
- Alexandr Svitov
- Jaroslav Svoboda
- Petr Svoboda (born 1966)
- Petr Svoboda (born 1980)
- Stanislav Svozil
- Garry Swain
- Nick Swaney
- Brian Swanson
- George Swarbrick
- Jeremy Swayman
- Bill Sweatt
- Lee Sweatt
- Bill Sweeney
- Bob Sweeney
- Don Sweeney
- Tim Sweeney
- Billy Sweezey
- Darryl Sydor
- Bob Sykes
- Phil Sykes
- Michal Sykora
- Petr Sykora (born 1976)
- Petr Sykora (born 1978)
- Dean Sylvester
- Don Sylvestri
- Danny Syvret
- Paul Szczechura
- Maksymilian Szuber
- Joe Szura
- Jordan Szwarz

== See also ==
- hockeydb.com NHL Player List - T
