= Cummy Burton =

Canadian ice hockey player

- Born: May 12, 1936 Sudbury, Ontario, Canada
- Died: August 25, 2015 (aged 79) Sudbury, Ontario, Canada
- Height: 5 ft 10 in (178 cm)
- Weight: 170 lb (77 kg; 12 st 2 lb)
- Position: Right wing
- Shot: Right
- Played for: Detroit Red Wings
- Playing career: 1956–1968

Cumming Scott Burton (May 12, 1936 – August 24, 2015) was a Canadian professional ice hockey right winger who played three seasons in the National Hockey League for the Detroit Red Wings between 1956 and 1959. The rest of his career, which lasted from 1956 to 1968, was spent in different minor leagues.

== Playing career ==
Burton is the cousin of Larry Aurie and wore #6 in Aurie's honor, having received special permission to do so while with the Red Wings as the number had been retired by team owner James Norris. The retirement status of Aurie's #6 has become controversial for the Wings, as unlike other numbers retired by the team, no banner for it hangs in Little Caesars Arena. Regarding this, Burton was quoted as saying, "Not hanging up Larry's number would be compared to the Yankees' not retiring Lou Gehrig's number, just because he was from the 1930s and now forgotten, just because it's all old stuff now. It's like saying that war heroes don't mean anything, just because they're not around anymore."

== Post-playing career ==
Following his retirement from hockey, he worked as a sports broadcaster for CKSO-TV in his hometown of Sudbury. He died on August 24, 2015.

== Career statistics ==
=== Regular season and playoffs ===
			Regular season					Playoffs
Season	Team	League	GP	G	A	Pts	PIM	GP	G	A	Pts	PIM
1952–53	Windsor Spitfires	OHA	54	7	4	11	88	—	—	—	—	—
1953–54	Hamilton Tiger Cubs	OHA	58	30	25	55	100	7	0	1	1	10
1954–55	Hamilton Tiger Cubs	OHA	28	6	10	16	64	3	1	1	2	6
1955–56	Hamilton Tiger Cubs	OHA	38	31	30	61	50	—	—	—	—	—
1955–56	Detroit Red Wings	NHL	3	0	0	0	0	3	0	0	0	0
1956–57	Edmonton Flyers	WHL	57	14	15	29	83	8	3	4	7	16
1957–58	Detroit Red Wings	NHL	25	0	1	1	12	—	—	—	—	—
1957–58	Edmonton Flyers	WHL	35	10	11	21	26	5	3	2	5	8
1958–59	Detroit Red Wings	NHL	14	0	1	1	9	—	—	—	—	—
1958–59	Seattle Totems	WHL	50	16	25	41	60	—	—	—	—	—
1959–60	Sudbury Wolves	EPHL	64	26	32	58	44	10	1	5	6	6
1960–61	Sudbury Wolves	EPHL	62	15	21	36	49	—	—	—	—	—
1961–62	Sudbury Wolves	EPHL	63	18	31	49	59	1	0	2	2	0
1962–63	Edmonton Flyers	WHL	42	4	10	14	24	3	0	0	0	7
1962–63	Pittsburgh Hornets	AHL	3	0	0	0	0	—	—	—	—	—
1963–64	Charlotte Checkers	EHL	35	15	31	46	28	3	0	1	1	0
1967–68	Florida Rockets	EHL	52	7	30	37	23	—	—	—	—	—
EPHL totals			189	59	84	143	152	11	1	7	8	6
WHL totals			184	44	61	105	193	16	6	6	12	31
NHL totals			42	0	2	2	19	3	0	0	0	0
