= Sandy McGregor =

Canadian ice hockey player (1939–2023)

- Born: March 30, 1939 Toronto, Ontario, Canada
- Died: November 6, 2023 (aged 84) McHenry, Illinois, U.S.
- Height: 5 ft 11 in (180 cm)
- Weight: 165 lb (75 kg; 11 st 11 lb)
- Position: Right wing
- Shot: Right
- Played for: New York Rangers
- Playing career: 1959–1969

Donald Alexander McGregor (March 30, 1939 – November 6, 2023) was a Canadian professional ice hockey player who played two games in the National Hockey League with the New York Rangers during the 1963–64 season. The rest of his career, which lasted from 1959 to 1969, was spent in the minor leagues.

McGregor died in McHenry, Illinois on November 6, 2023, at the age of 84.

== Career statistics ==
=== Regular season and playoffs ===
| | | | Regular season | | | | | Playoffs |
| Season | Team | League | GP | G | A | Pts | PIM | GP | G | A | Pts | PIM |
|---|---|---|---|---|---|---|---|---|---|---|---|---|
| 1956–57 | Toronto Marlboros | OHA | 1 | 0 | 0 | 0 | 0 | — | — | — | — | — |
| 1957–58 | Guelph Biltmores | OHA | 32 | 7 | 10 | 17 | 2 | — | — | — | — | — |
| 1958–59 | Guelph Biltmores | OHA | 54 | 34 | 36 | 70 | 26 | 6 | 0 | 4 | 4 | 2 |
| 1959–60 | Trois-Rivières Lions | EPHL | 58 | 11 | 6 | 17 | 14 | 7 | 0 | 1 | 1 | 4 |
| 1960–61 | Kitchener Beavers | EPHL | 62 | 11 | 26 | 37 | 30 | 7 | 1 | 0 | 1 | 4 |
| 1961–62 | Kitchener Beavers | EPHL | 70 | 24 | 33 | 57 | 65 | 7 | 3 | 0 | 3 | 8 |
| 1962–63 | Baltimore Clippers | AHL | 69 | 21 | 28 | 49 | 22 | 3 | 0 | 0 | 0 | 0 |
| 1963–64 | New York Rangers | NHL | 2 | 0 | 0 | 0 | 2 | — | — | — | — | — |
| 1963–64 | Baltimore Clippers | AHL | 55 | 15 | 12 | 27 | 10 | — | — | — | — | — |
| 1964–65 | Baltimore Clippers | AHL | 66 | 23 | 16 | 39 | 14 | 5 | 1 | 0 | 1 | 2 |
| 1965–66 | Baltimore Clippers | AHL | 55 | 8 | 8 | 16 | 22 | — | — | — | — | — |
| 1966–67 | Baltimore Clippers | AHL | 54 | 12 | 16 | 28 | 25 | 7 | 1 | 3 | 4 | 0 |
| 1967–68 | Baltimore Clippers | AHL | 72 | 29 | 27 | 56 | 22 | — | — | — | — | — |
| 1968–69 | Baltimore Clippers | AHL | 73 | 44 | 19 | 63 | 34 | 4 | 0 | 2 | 2 | 2 |
| AHL totals | | | 444 | 152 | 126 | 278 | 149 | 19 | 2 | 5 | 7 | 4 |
| NHL totals | | | 2 | 0 | 0 | 0 | 2 | — | — | — | — | — |
