= Bob Sabourin =

Canadian ice hockey player, coach, and general manager (1933–2020)

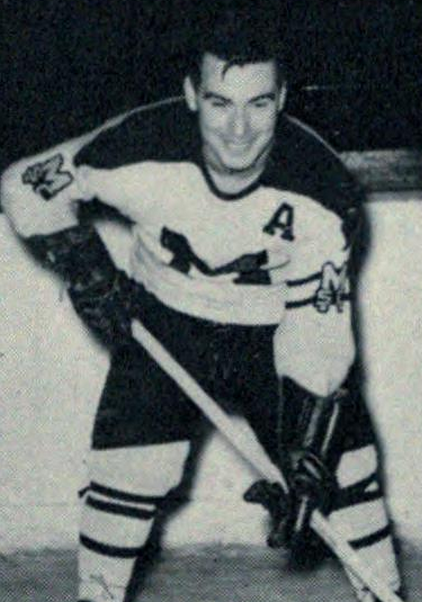
- Sabourin c. 1952 at St. Michaels
- Born: March 17, 1933; Sudbury, Ontario, Canada
- Died: July 9, 2020 (aged 87); Jacksonville, Florida, US
- Height: 5 ft 9 in (175 cm)
- Weight: 177 lb (80 kg; 12 st 9 lb)
- Position: Left wing
- Shot: Left
- Played for: Toronto Maple Leafs
- Playing career: 1952–1968

Robert Patrick Sabourin (March 17, 1933 – July 9, 2020) was a Canadian professional ice hockey player, coach, and general manager. A left winger, he played one game in the National Hockey League (NHL), for the Toronto Maple Leafs during the 1951–52 NHL season. He later played in the minor leagues, eventually joining the Jacksonville Rockets of the Eastern Hockey League in the 1960s. He subsequently became their head coach and general manager, serving with the team until they folded in 1971. Afterward he remained in Jacksonville, where he formed an advertising company with partner Jimmy Murdock to promote concerts, professional wrestling, and other events. He later owned the skating rink Skate World (now Jacksonville Ice) and owned another hockey team, the Jacksonville Bullets, which folded in 1996. He died on July 9, 2020.

== Career statistics ==
=== Regular season and playoffs ===
			Regular season					Playoffs
Season	Team	League	GP	G	A	Pts	PIM	GP	G	A	Pts	PIM
1948–49	Toronto St. Michael's Majors	OHA	10	2	2	4	0	—	—	—	—	—
1949–50	Toronto St. Michael's Majors	OHA	47	21	11	32	38	5	3	0	3	2
1950–51	Toronto St. Michael's Majors	OHA	54	25	18	43	54	—	—	—	—	—
1951–52	Toronto St. Michael's Majors	OHA	51	31	23	54	26	8	2	4	6	4
1951–52	Toronto Maple Leafs	NHL	1	0	0	0	2	—	—	—	—	—
1952–53	Pittsburgh Hornets	AHL	51	22	20	42	19	10	6	0	6	14
1953–54	Ottawa Senators	QSHL	4	2	5	7	2	—	—	—	—	—
1953–54	Pittsburgh Hornets	AHL	64	16	30	46	29	5	3	1	4	6
1954–55	Pittsburgh Hornets	AHL	49	8	19	27	14	3	0	0	0	2
1955–56	Pittsburgh Hornets	AHL	47	6	16	22	39	3	0	0	0	0
1956–57	Springfield Indians	AHL	59	11	29	40	21	—	—	—	—	—
1957–58	Quebec Aces	QSHL	64	28	32	60	8	13	5	1	6	12
1958–59	Trois-Rivières Lions	QSHL	59	25	25	50	12	8	1	2	3	5
1959–60	Trois-Rivières Lions	EPHL	66	22	31	53	24	4	1	0	1	14
1960–61	Kitchener Beavers	EPHL	70	20	36	56	24	7	1	1	2	2
1961–62	North Bay Trappers	EPHL	67	12	24	36	16	—	—	—	—	—
1962–63	Sudbury Wolves	EPHL	1	0	0	0	0	—	—	—	—	—
1962–63	Seattle Totems	WHL	41	15	18	33	10	17	8	9	17	6
1963–64	Seattle Totems	WHL	68	13	19	32	15	—	—	—	—	—
1964–65	Seattle Totems	WHL	57	11	10	21	12	7	1	0	1	4
1965–66	Long Island Ducks	EHL	72	31	43	74	40	12	3	7	10	22
1966–67	Florida Rockets	EHL	71	16	30	46	38	—	—	—	—	—
1967–68	Florida Rockets	EHL	55	13	22	35	10	—	—	—	—	—
AHL totals			270	63	114	177	122	21	9	1	10	22
EPHL totals			204	54	91	145	64	11	2	1	3	16
NHL totals			1	0	0	0	2	—	—	—	—	—

== See also ==
- List of players who played only one game in the NHL
