= Jack Martin (ice hockey) =

Canadian ice hockey player (1940–2023)

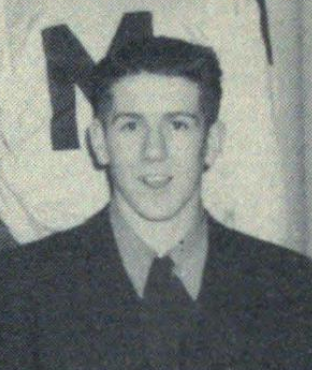
- Martin c. 1956
- Born: November 29, 1940; St. Catharines, Ontario, Canada
- Died: December 8, 2023 (aged 83)
- Height: 5 ft 11 in (180 cm)
- Weight: 184 lb (83 kg; 13 st 2 lb)
- Position: Centre
- Shot: Left
- Played for: Toronto Maple Leafs
- Playing career: 1960–1965

Jack Raymond Martin (November 29, 1940 – December 8, 2023) was a Canadian professional ice hockey centre who played in one National Hockey League game for the Toronto Maple Leafs during the 1960–61 season, on November 27, 1960, against the Detroit Red Wings. The rest of his career, which lasted from 1960 to 1965, was spent in the minor leagues. Martin died on December 8, 2023, at the age of 83.

== Career statistics ==
=== Regular season and playoffs ===
| | | | Regular season | | | | | Playoffs |
| Season | Team | League | GP | G | A | Pts | PIM | GP | G | A | Pts | PIM |
|---|---|---|---|---|---|---|---|---|---|---|---|---|
| 1957–58 | St. Michael's Majors | OHA | 50 | 11 | 15 | 26 | 32 | 9 | 2 | 4 | 6 | 10 |
| 1958–59 | Toronto Marlboros | OHA | 51 | 15 | 14 | 29 | 62 | 5 | 3 | 0 | 3 | 13 |
| 1959–60 | Toronto Marlboros | OHA | 42 | 30 | 30 | 60 | 63 | 4 | 1 | 3 | 4 | 10 |
| 1959–60 | Sudbury Wolves | EPHL | — | — | — | — | — | 4 | 1 | 0 | 1 | 2 |
| 1960–61 | Toronto Maple Leafs | NHL | 1 | 0 | 0 | 0 | 0 | — | — | — | — | — |
| 1960–61 | Sudbury Wolves | EPHL | 44 | 9 | 12 | 21 | 22 | — | — | — | — | — |
| 1961–62 | Sault Thunderbirds | EPHL | 10 | 1 | 1 | 2 | 8 | — | — | — | — | — |
| 1961–62 | Pittsburgh Hornets | AHL | 4 | 0 | 1 | 1 | 0 | — | — | — | — | — |
| 1961–62 | San Francisco Seals | WHL | 28 | 3 | 6 | 9 | 12 | — | — | — | — | — |
| 1962–63 | Charlotte Checkers | EHL | 67 | 32 | 33 | 65 | 57 | 10 | 2 | 6 | 8 | 4 |
| 1963–64 | Nashville Dixie Flyers | EHL | 71 | 47 | 60 | 107 | 10 | 2 | 1 | 0 | 1 | 2 |
| 1964–65 | Knoxville Knights | EHL | 67 | 39 | 69 | 108 | 32 | 10 | 5 | 5 | 10 | 4 |
| EHL totals | | | 205 | 118 | 162 | 280 | 99 | 22 | 8 | 11 | 19 | 10 |
| EPHL totals | | | 143 | 56 | 59 | 115 | 157 | 18 | 6 | 7 | 13 | 33 |
| NHL totals | | | 1 | 0 | 0 | 0 | 0 | — | — | — | — | — |

== See also ==
- List of players who played only one game in the NHL
