= Leon Rochefort =

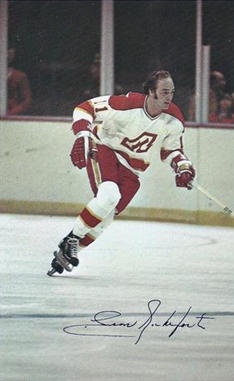
- Born: May 4, 1939 (age 86) Cap-de-la-Madeleine, Quebec, Canada
- Height: 6 ft 0 in (183 cm)
- Weight: 184 lb (83 kg; 13 st 2 lb)
- Position: Centre
- Shot: Right
- Played for: New York Rangers; Montreal Canadiens; Philadelphia Flyers; Los Angeles Kings; Detroit Red Wings; Atlanta Flames; Vancouver Canucks
- Playing career: 1959–1976

Joseph Fernand Léon Rochefort (born May 4, 1939) is a Canadian former professional ice hockey centreman who spent 15 seasons in the National Hockey League playing for seven clubs in a career that lasted from 1959 to 1976. A hard-working journeyman, he won the Stanley Cup with the Montreal Canadiens in 1966 and 1971.

== Playing career ==
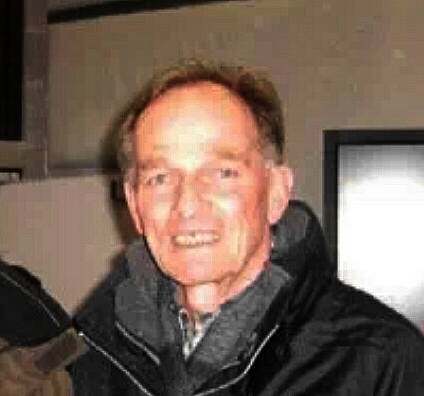
Rochefort in 2009

Rochefort was born in Cap-de-la-Madeleine, Quebec. He came up through the junior system of the New York Rangers, playing for the Guelph Biltmores alongside future Hall of Famers Rod Gilbert and Jean Ratelle. He turned pro in 1959 and made his NHL debut in 1960–61 appearing in a single game for the Rangers. In 1962–63, he appeared in 23 games for the Rangers, recording 5 goals and 9 points.

Before the 1963–64 campaign, Rochefort was dealt to the Montreal Canadiens in a seven-player trade involving star goaltenders Jacques Plante and Gump Worsley. He would find it difficult to crack the powerful Montreal roster, spending most of the next three years with the Quebec Aces of the American Hockey League and appearing in just 11 games in Montreal over that span. However, he was called up to the team for the 1966 playoffs and appeared in 4 games, recording a goal and an assist, as Montreal won the Stanley Cup. He would build on that success the following year, spending most of the 1966–67 season in Montreal, notching 9 goals and 7 assists in 27 games.

Rochefort was claimed by the Philadelphia Flyers in the 1967 NHL Expansion Draft, and in Philadelphia was finally able to establish himself as a full-time NHL player. He would have his finest NHL season in 1967–68, leading the Flyers with 21 goals and finishing 3rd in overall scoring with 42 points. He would have another solid year in 1968–69, finishing 5th on Philadelphia with 35 points, but was dealt to the Los Angeles Kings after the season in a deal for enforcer Reggie Fleming. He spent a single season in Los Angeles, and led the team in assists although the team struggled to a last-place finish.

For the 1970–71 season, Rochefort was re-acquired by the Canadiens. He finished the year with just 5 goals and was briefly dispatched to the AHL, but appeared in 10 playoff games as Montreal again won the Stanley Cup. Following the season, he was dealt to the Detroit Red Wings, where he had a bounce-back year to finish with 17 goals and 28 points. Early in the 1972–73 season, he was dealt again, this time to the expansion Atlanta Flames where he would be a stabilizing influence in the team's first two NHL seasons.

Before the 1974–75 season, Rochefort was sold to the Vancouver Canucks, who would be his seventh NHL team. At the age of 35, he turned in one of the best seasons of his career, notching 18 goals - good for 5th on the team - and 29 points, and was a valuable veteran influence on a Canuck team that would win their division for the first time in their history. However, he was sent to the minors after a sluggish start to the following year, and he retired from the sport in 1976.

Rochefort finished his career with totals of 121 goals and 147 assists for 268 points in 617 NHL games, along with just 93 penalty minutes.

Rochefort is the uncle of Normand Rochefort, who spent 13 seasons as an NHL defender between 1980 and 1994.

== Career statistics ==
=== Regular season and playoffs ===
			Regular season					Playoffs
Season	Team	League	GP	G	A	Pts	PIM	GP	G	A	Pts	PIM
1954–55	Trois-Rivières Lions	QAAA	20	15	21	36	—	—	—	—	—	—
1955–56	Trois-Rivières Lions	QHL	—	—	—	—	—	—	—	—	—	—
1956–57	Trois-Rivières Lions	QHL	—	—	—	—	—	—	—	—	—	—
1957–58	Guelph Biltmores	OHA	52	17	18	35	19	—	—	—	—	—
1958–59	Guelph Biltmores	OHA	54	16	19	35	16	10	8	4	12	4
1959–60	Trois-Rivières Lions	EPHL	70	27	22	49	35	4	0	0	0	9
1960–61	New York Rangers	NHL	1	0	0	0	0	—	—	—	—	—
1960–61	Kitchener-Waterloo Beavers	EPHL	65	20	18	38	33	7	3	1	4	14
1961–62	Kitchener-Waterloo Beavers	EPHL	69	33	27	60	29	—	—	—	—	—
1962–63	New York Rangers	NHL	23	5	4	9	6	—	—	—	—	—
1962–63	Baltimore Clippers	AHL	50	14	20	34	12	—	—	—	—	—
1963–64	Montreal Canadiens	NHL	3	0	0	0	0	—	—	—	—	—
1963–64	Quebec Aces	AHL	71	27	25	52	14	9	4	3	7	2
1964–65	Montreal Canadiens	NHL	9	2	0	2	0	—	—	—	—	—
1964–65	Quebec Aces	AHL	41	18	21	39	12	5	0	3	3	6
1965–66	Montreal Canadiens	NHL	1	0	1	1	0	4	1	1	2	4
1965–66	Quebec Aces	AHL	71	35	37	72	12	6	5	3	8	0
1966–67	Montreal Canadiens	NHL	27	9	7	16	6	10	1	1	2	4
1966–67	Quebec Aces	AHL	8	3	2	5	2	—	—	—	—	—
1967–68	Philadelphia Flyers	NHL	73	21	21	42	16	7	2	0	2	2
1968–69	Philadelphia Flyers	NHL	65	14	21	35	10	3	0	0	0	0
1969–70	Los Angeles Kings	NHL	76	9	23	32	14	—	—	—	—	—
1970–71	Montreal Canadiens	NHL	57	5	10	15	4	10	0	0	0	6
1970–71	Montreal Voyageurs	AHL	10	1	6	7	0	—	—	—	—	—
1971–72	Detroit Red Wings	NHL	64	17	12	29	10	—	—	—	—	—
1972–73	Detroit Red Wings	NHL	20	2	4	6	2	—	—	—	—	—
1972–73	Atlanta Flames	NHL	54	9	18	27	10	—	—	—	—	—
1973–74	Atlanta Flames	NHL	56	10	12	22	13	—	—	—	—	—
1974–75	Vancouver Canucks	NHL	76	18	11	29	2	5	0	2	2	0
1975–76	Vancouver Canucks	NHL	11	0	3	3	0	—	—	—	—	—
1975–76	Tulsa Oilers	CHL	60	25	40	65	2	9	2	5	7	6
NHL totals			617	121	147	268	93	39	4	4	8	16

== Awards ==
- 1966 and 1971 Stanley Cup Champion (Montreal)
- Led Philadelphia Flyers in goals during their inaugural season (1967–68)
