= Wayne Hall (ice hockey) =

Canadian ice hockey player

- Born: May 22, 1939 (age 87) Melita, Manitoba, Canada
- Height: 5 ft 9 in (175 cm)
- Weight: 165 lb (75 kg; 11 st 11 lb)
- Position: Left wing
- Shot: Left
- Played for: New York Rangers
- Playing career: 1956–1972

Gary Wayne Hall (born May 22, 1939) is a Canadian retired professional ice hockey winger who played four games in the National Hockey League for the New York Rangers in December 1960. The rest of his career, which lasted from 1959 to 1972, was spent in the minor leagues.

== Career ==
The Rangers signed Hall as a free agent in 1957. In December 1960 he played four games in the National Hockey League for the New York Rangers before being returned to the Kitchener Beavers. He also played for a number a minor league hockey teams during his career, including the junior league Flin Flon Bombers (1956–59), Trois-Rivières Lions (1959–60), Vancouver Canuck, and Seattle Totems, among others. After playing his last season with the Buffalo Bisons, he retired from hockey in 1972.

== Career statistics ==
=== Regular season and playoffs ===
			Regular season					Playoffs
Season	Team	League	GP	G	A	Pts	PIM	GP	G	A	Pts	PIM
1956–57	Flin Flon Bombers	SJHL	12	0	3	3	2	—	—	—	—	—
1956–57	Flin Flon Bombers	M-Cup	—	—	—	—	—	1	0	0	0	)
1957–58	Flin Flon Bombers	SJHL	38	8	19	27	20	2	0	1	1	2
1958–59	Flin Flon Bombers	SJHL	45	36	48	84	24	11	5	10	15	16
1958–59	Barrie Flyers	M-Cup	—	—	—	—	—	8	7	7	14	2
1959–60	Trois-Rivières Lions	EPHL	64	9	29	38	16	7	0	1	1	0
1960–61	New York Rangers	NHL	4	0	0	0	0	—	—	—	—	—
1960–61	Kitchener Beavers	EPHL	56	9	27	36	14	7	0	1	1	5
1961–62	Vancouver Canucks	WHL	61	12	30	42	4	—	—	—	—	—
1962–63	Seattle Totems	WHL	53	10	14	24	8	17	1	8	9	0
1963–64	St. Paul Rangers	CPHL	72	15	28	43	14	10	3	4	7	0
1964–65	Providence Reds	AHL	23	4	13	17	14	—	—	—	—	—
1964–65	St. Paul Rangers	CPHL	24	3	9	12	4	1	1	0	1	0
1965–66	Minnesota Rangers	CPHL	60	17	35	52	10	7	1	2	3	2
1966–67	Omaha Knights	CPHL	58	12	29	41	20	—	—	—	—	—
1967–68	Omaha Knights	CPHL	65	18	23	41	0	—	—	—	—	—
1968–69	Omaha Knights	CPHL	1	0	0	0	0	—	—	—	—	—
1968–69	Buffalo Bisons	AHL	54	5	18	23	16	6	0	0	0	2
1971–72	Waterloo Black Hawks	USHL	35	8	17	25	32	—	—	—	—	—
CPHL totals			279	65	124	189	48	18	5	6	11	2
NHL totals			4	0	0	0	0	—	—	—	—	—
