= Mel Pearson (ice hockey, born 1938) =

Ice hockey player

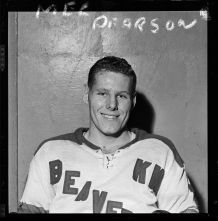
- Pearson in KW Beavers jersey. (1961)
- Born: April 29, 1938 Flin Flon, Manitoba, Canada
- Died: January 9, 1999 (aged 60) Flin Flon, Manitoba, Canada
- Height: 5 ft 10 in (178 cm)
- Weight: 180 lb (82 kg; 12 st 12 lb)
- Position: Centre
- Shot: Left
- Played for: New York Rangers; Pittsburgh Penguins; Minnesota Fighting Saints
- Playing career: 1957–1973

George Alexander Melvin Pearson (April 29, 1938 – January 9, 1999) was a Canadian professional ice hockey forward. He played 38 games in the National Hockey League for the New York Rangers and Pittsburgh Penguins from 1960 to 1968. He also played 70 games in the World Hockey Association with the Minnesota Fighting Saints during the 1972–73 season.

== Personal life ==
Pearson had three children, including hockey coach Mel Pearson. Mel is the former head coach of the Michigan Wolverines hockey team. His other son, Ted, was a Calgary Flames draft pick who played over 200 games of professional hockey in the AHL, IHL, and Germany's second-tier Bundesliga.

== Career statistics ==
=== Regular season and playoffs ===
			Regular season					Playoffs
Season	Team	League	GP	G	A	Pts	PIM	GP	G	A	Pts	PIM
1955–56	Flin Flon Bombers	SJHL	48	26	23	49	32	—	—	—	—	—
1955–56	Flin Flon Bombers	M-Cup	—	—	—	—	—	7	2	2	4	2
1956–57	Flin Flon Bombers	SJHL	56	59	49	108	86	10	13	9	22	6
1957–58	Providence Reds	AHL	10	1	2	3	0	—	—	—	—	—
1957–58	Trois-Rivières Lions	QSHL	54	17	28	45	60	—	—	—	—	—
1957–58	Fort William Canadiens	M-Cup	—	—	—	—	—	17	10	10	20	17
1958–59	Vancouver Canucks	WHL	70	16	33	49	35	8	1	2	3	11
1959–60	Trois-Rivières Lions	EPHL	43	21	23	44	26	—	—	—	—	—
1959–60	New York Rangers	NHL	23	1	5	6	13	—	—	—	—	—
1960–61	Kitchener Beavers	EPHL	69	20	27	47	62	7	1	1	2	10
1961–62	New York Rangers	NHL	3	0	0	0	2	—	—	—	—	—
1961–62	Kitchener Beavers	EPHL	66	23	38	61	44	7	1	0	1	10
1962–63	New York Rangers	NHL	5	1	0	1	6	—	—	—	—	—
1962–63	Baltimore Clippers	AHL	67	13	29	42	40	3	1	1	2	4
1963–64	Baltimore Clippers	AHL	68	8	22	30	35	—	—	—	—	—
1964–65	New York Rangers	NHL	5	0	0	0	4	—	—	—	—	—
1964–65	St. Paul Rangers	CPHL	61	24	46	70	30	11	5	7	12	20
1965–66	Buffalo Bisons	AHL	72	18	40	58	30	—	—	—	—	—
1966–67	Los Angeles Blades	WHL	68	17	45	62	24	—	—	—	—	—
1967–68	Pittsburgh Penguins	NHL	2	0	1	1	0	—	—	—	—	—
1967–68	Portland Buckaroos	WHL	68	19	20	39	16	12	1	4	5	7
1968–69	Portland Buckaroos	WHL	74	19	26	45	44	11	0	1	1	10
1969–70	Portland Buckaroos	WHL	72	26	22	48	24	11	2	4	6	30
1970–71	Portland Buckaroos	WHL	72	23	19	42	52	11	1	6	7	10
1971–72	Portland Buckaroos	WHL	72	21	38	59	45	11	1	1	2	17
1972–73	Minnesota Fighting Saints	WHA	70	8	12	20	12	6	3	0	3	0
WHA totals			70	8	12	20	12	6	3	0	3	0
NHL totals			38	2	6	8	25	—	—	—	—	—
