= Jack Bownass =

Canadian ice hockey player

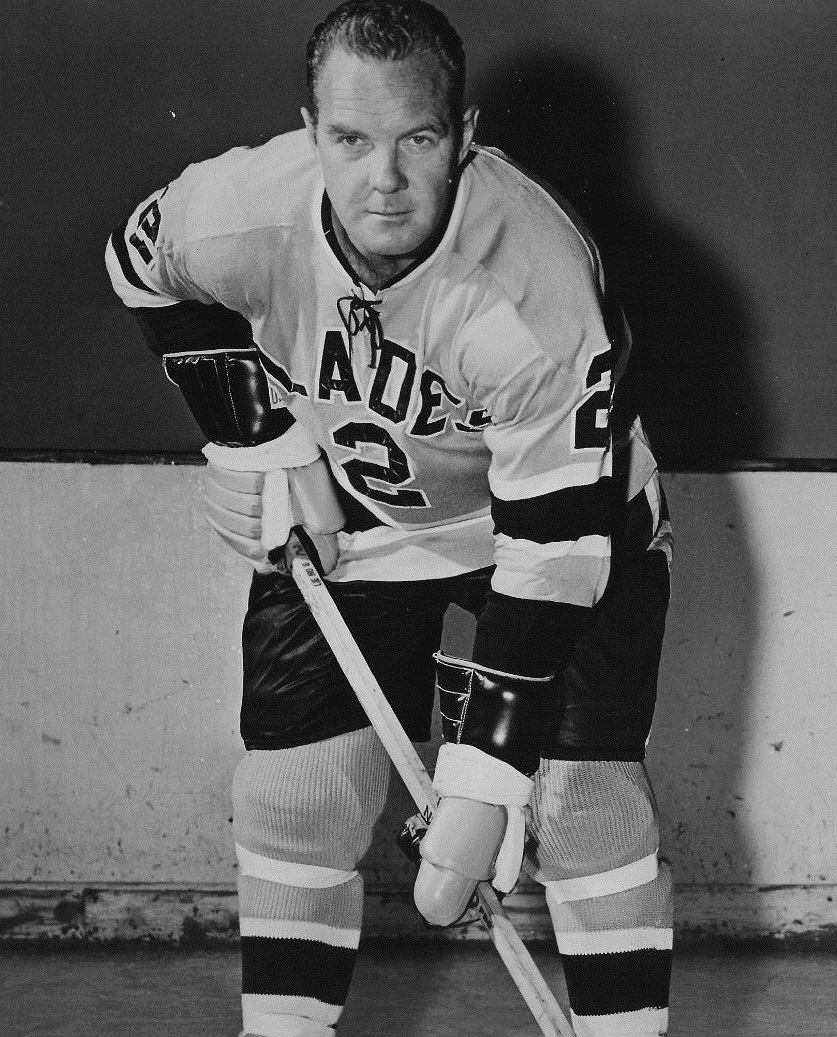
- Born: July 27, 1930 Winnipeg, Manitoba, Canada
- Died: February 10, 2010 (aged 79) Winnipeg, Manitoba, Canada
- Height: 6 ft 1 in (185 cm)
- Weight: 185 lb (84 kg; 13 st 3 lb)
- Position: Defence
- Shot: Left
- Played for: Montreal Canadiens; New York Rangers
- National team: Canada
- Playing career: 1950–1971

John Jack Bownass (July 27, 1930 – February 10, 2010) was a Canadian ice hockey player. In the early 1960s he served as captain of the Kitchener-Waterloo Beavers in the Eastern Professional Hockey League. He went on to play 80 games in the National Hockey League with the Montreal Canadiens and New York Rangers from 1958 to 1961. The rest of his career, which lasted from 1950 to 1971, was spent in the minor leagues. He was born and died in Winnipeg, Manitoba.

The Canadian Amateur Hockey Association established a second Canadian national team in 1967, to increase the available pool of players at the 1968 Winter Olympics, and Father David Bauer recruited Bownass to coach the second team which was based in Ottawa.

== Career statistics ==
=== Regular season and playoffs ===
			Regular season					Playoffs
Season	Team	League	GP	G	A	Pts	PIM	GP	G	A	Pts	PIM
1946–47	Winnipeg Rangers	MJHL	—	—	—	—	—	—	—	—	—	—
1947–48	Winnipeg Black Hawks	MJHL	1	0	0	0	0	—	—	—	—	—
1948–49	Winnipeg Black Hawks	MJHL	29	3	2	5	16	—	—	—	—	—
1949–50	Winnipeg Black Hawks	MJHL	36	3	7	10	76	6	1	1	2	12
1950–51	Sarnia Sailors	IHL	3	0	0	0	0	—	—	—	—	—
1950–51	Detroit Hettche	IHL	43	6	7	13	101	3	0	0	0	4
1951–52	Shawinigan Falls Cataractes	QSHL	49	0	3	3	84	—	—	—	—	—
1952–53	Chicoutimi Sagueneens	QSHL	38	2	4	6	59	—	—	—	—	—
1953–54	Sherbrooke Saints	QSHL	71	9	17	26	111	5	1	0	1	4
1954–55	Montreal Royals	QSHL	56	5	27	32	88	14	1	2	3	8
1955–56	Seattle Americans	WHL	65	10	22	32	131	—	—	—	—	—
1956–57	Trois-Rivières Lions	QSHL	62	7	16	23	75	4	0	4	4	4
1957–58	Montreal Canadiens	NHL	4	0	1	1	0	—	—	—	—	—
1957–58	Montreal Royals	QSHL	61	3	31	34	120	7	0	6	6	21
1958–59	New York Rangers	NHL	35	1	2	3	20	—	—	—	—	—
1958–59	Buffalo Bisons	AHL	21	3	9	12	26	—	—	—	—	—
1959–60	New York Rangers	NHL	37	2	5	7	34	—	—	—	—	—
1959–60	Springfield Indians	AHL	16	0	0	0	37	—	—	—	—	—
1960–61	Kitchener Beavers	EPHL	70	1	36	37	110	7	0	4	4	12
1961–62	New York Rangers	NHL	4	0	0	0	4	—	—	—	—	—
1961–62	Kingston Beavers	EPHL	62	6	40	46	119	7	2	0	2	0
1962–63	Los Angeles Blades	WHL	67	4	24	28	55	3	0	1	1	0
1963–64	Los Angeles Blades	WHL	53	2	19	21	65	—	—	—	—	—
1963–64	Baltimore Clippers	AHL	15	0	4	4	27	—	—	—	—	—
1966–67	Canadian National Team	Intl	—	—	—	—	—	—	—	—	—	—
1967–68	Hull Nationals	QUE Sr	24	0	13	13	21	—	—	—	—	—
1968–69	Ottawa Nationals	OHA Sr	4	0	0	0	2	—	—	—	—	—
1969–70	Canadian National Team	Intl	—	—	—	—	—	—	—	—	—	—
1970–71	Jacksonville Rockets	EHL	8	0	0	0	2	—	—	—	—	—
1970–71	Omaha Knights	CHL	—	—	—	—	—	1	0	0	0	0
QSHL totals			337	26	98	124	537	30	2	12	14	37
NHL totals			80	3	7	10	58	—	—	—	—	—

=== International ===
Year	Team	Event	GP	G	A	Pts	PIM
1967	Canada	WC	7	0	2	2	12
1969	Canada	WC	4	0	0	0	4
Senior totals			11	0	2	2	16

== Awards and achievements ==
- MJHL Second All-Star Team (1949)
- MJHL First All-Star Team (1950)
- IHL Second All-Star Team (1951)
- QSHL First All-Star Team (1958)
- MJHL First All-Star Team Coach (1966)
- Turnbull Cup MJHL Championship (1966)
- Honoured Member of the Manitoba Hockey Hall of Fame
