= Al LeBrun =

Canadian ice hockey player

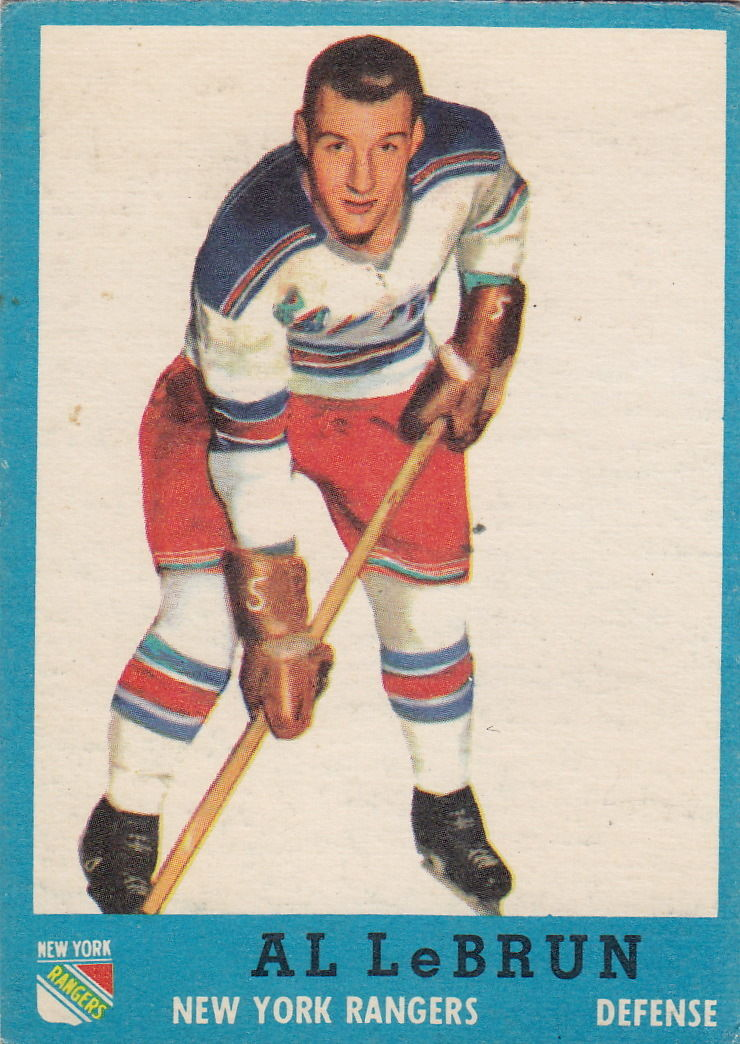
- Born: December 1, 1940 (age 85) Timmins, Ontario, Canada
- Height: 6 ft 0 in (183 cm)
- Weight: 185 lb (84 kg; 13 st 3 lb)
- Position: Defence
- Shot: Right
- Played for: New York Rangers
- Playing career: 1960–1974

Albert Ivan LeBrun (born December 1, 1940) is a Canadian retired professional ice hockey player who played six games in the National Hockey League for the New York Rangers during the 1960–61 and 1965–66 seasons. The rest of his career, which lasted from 1960 to 1974, was spent in the minor leagues.

== Career statistics ==
=== Regular season and playoffs ===
			Regular season					Playoffs
Season	Team	League	GP	G	A	Pts	PIM	GP	G	A	Pts	PIM
1957–58	Guelph Biltmores	OHA	34	0	1	1	16	—	—	—	—	—
1958–59	Guelph Biltmores	OHA	54	3	12	15	55	10	0	1	1	17
1959–60	Guelph Biltmores	OHA	48	5	13	18	74	5	1	0	1	8
1960–61	New York Rangers	NHL	4	0	2	2	4	—	—	—	—	—
1960–61	Guelph Royals	OHA	47	4	12	16	127	12	1	4	5	40
1960–61	Kitchener Beavers	EPHL	1	0	0	0	0	—	—	—	—	—
1961–62	Kitchener Beavers	EPHL	70	0	16	16	36	7	0	1	1	8
1962–63	Vancouver Canucks	WHL	55	5	8	13	31	—	—	—	—	—
1964–65	St. Paul Rangers	CPHL	66	11	15	26	52	11	1	1	2	0
1965–66	New York Rangers	NHL	2	0	0	0	0	—	—	—	—	—
1965–66	St. Paul Rangers	CPHL	69	4	13	17	38	7	0	3	3	4
1966–67	Pittsburgh Hornets	AHL	26	1	8	9	24	—	—	—	—	—
1966–67	Los Angeles Blades	WHL	42	1	8	9	33	—	—	—	—	—
1967–68	Dallas Black Hawks	CPHL	61	6	17	23	53	4	0	0	0	4
1968–69	Memphis South Stars	CPHL	34	1	4	5	20	—	—	—	—	—
1968–69	San Diego Gulls	WHL	29	1	4	5	8	3	0	0	0	2
1969–70	San Diego Gulls	WHL	72	7	18	25	37	6	0	1	1	2
1970–71	San Diego Gulls	WHL	66	3	13	16	50	—	—	—	—	—
1971–72	San Diego Gulls	WHL	72	2	17	19	67	4	0	0	0	2
1972–73	San Diego Gulls	WHL	72	2	16	18	101	6	0	0	0	2
1973–74	San Diego Gulls	WHL	37	0	4	4	10	4	0	1	1	0
WHL totals			445	21	88	109	337	23	0	2	2	8
NHL totals			6	0	2	2	4	—	—	—	—	—
