= John Sleaver =

Canadian ice hockey player (1934–2001)

- Born: August 18, 1934; Copper Cliff, Ontario, Canada
- Died: November 19, 2001 (aged 67)
- Height: 6 ft 1 in (185 cm)
- Weight: 180 lb (82 kg; 12 st 12 lb)
- Position: Centre
- Shot: Right
- Played for: Chicago Black Hawks
- Playing career: 1954–1970

John Arthur Sleaver (August 18, 1934 in– November 19, 2001) was a Canadian professional ice hockey player who played 13 games in the National Hockey League with the Chicago Black Hawks between 1954 and 1957. The rest of his career, which lasted from 1954 to 1970, was spent in various minor leagues.

== Playing career ==
While playing for the Sudbury Wolves in the Eastern Professional Hockey League, Sleaver was involved in an incident with a spectator in Trois-Rivières, Quebec on December 27, 1959. He was alleged to have swung his stick at fan Michel Beauchamp, who was hit on the wrist. A warrant was issued for Sleaver's arrest. Four policemen were sent to the Wolves' dressing room after the game, but Sleaver had already changed and left. Provincial police stopped the Wolves' team bus on its way back to Sudbury, but Sleaver was not found aboard.

== Career statistics ==
=== Regular season and playoffs ===
			Regular season					Playoffs
Season	Team	League	GP	G	A	Pts	PIM	GP	G	A	Pts	PIM
1950–51	Galt Black Hawks	OHA	46	9	14	23	23	3	0	1	1	4
1951–52	Galt Black Hawks	OHA	54	22	35	57	53	3	0	3	3	4
1952–53	Galt Black Hawks	OHA	56	20	36	56	96	10	3	7	10	6
1953–54	Chicago Black Hawks	NHL	1	0	0	0	2	—	—	—	—	—
1953–54	Galt Black Hawks	OHA	58	23	37	60	67	—	—	—	—	—
1954–55	Galt Black Hawks	OHA	49	14	20	34	36	4	3	0	3	4
1955–56	Buffalo Bisons	AHL	2	1	1	2	2	—	—	—	—	—
1955–56	Windsor Bulldogs	OHA	48	13	17	30	27	—	—	—	—	—
1956–57	Chicago Black Hawks	NHL	12	1	0	1	4	—	—	—	—	—
1956–57	Buffalo Bisons	AHL	29	7	9	16	22	—	—	—	—	—
1956–57	Windsor Bulldogs	OHA Sr	21	7	15	22	43	—	—	—	—	—
1957–58	Buffalo Bisons	AHL	1	0	0	0	0	—	—	—	—	—
1957–58	Quebec Aces	QSHL	59	17	19	36	56	13	3	5	8	23
1958–59	Trois-Rivières Lions	QSHL	61	10	14	24	42	8	0	4	4	12
1959–60	Sudbury Wolves	EPHL	70	20	35	55	42	14	2	6	8	12
1960–61	Vancouver Canucks	WHL	3	0	0	0	2	—	—	—	—	—
1960–61	Sudbury Wolves	EPHL	60	17	34	51	34	—	—	—	—	—
1961–62	North Bay Trappers	EPHL	70	24	34	58	59	—	—	—	—	—
1962–63	Springfield Indians	AHL	38	6	16	22	8	—	—	—	—	—
1963–64	Denver Invaders	WHL	69	23	46	69	59	5	1	5	6	4
1964–65	Victoria Maple Leafs	WHL	70	14	49	63	39	12	3	6	9	16
1965–66	Victoria Maple Leafs	WHL	72	19	49	68	47	14	1	6	7	10
1966–67	Providence Reds	AHL	72	13	42	55	24	—	—	—	—	—
1967–68	Providence Reds	AHL	72	15	35	50	42	8	0	3	3	6
1968–69	Providence Reds	AHL	73	7	18	25	29	9	2	5	7	0
1969–70	Columbus Checkers	IHL	72	12	49	61	71	—	—	—	—	—
AHL totals			287	49	121	170	107	17	2	8	10	6
NHL totals			13	1	0	1	6	—	—	—	—	—
