= Bob Wilson (ice hockey) =

Canadian ice hockey player (1934–2020)

- Born: February 18, 1934; Sudbury, Ontario, Canada
- Died: July 29, 2020 (aged 86)
- Height: 5 ft 9 in (175 cm)
- Weight: 178 lb (81 kg; 12 st 10 lb)
- Position: Defence
- Shot: Left
- Played for: Chicago Black Hawks
- Playing career: 1954–1970

Robert Wayne Wilson (February 18, 1934 – July 29, 2020) was a Canadian professional ice hockey defenceman who played in one game in the National Hockey League for the Chicago Black Hawks during the 1953–54 season, on February 4, 1954 against the New York Rangers. The rest of his career, which lasted from 1954 to 1970, was spent in the minor leagues.

== Career statistics ==
=== Regular season and playoffs ===
			Regular season					Playoffs
Season	Team	League	GP	G	A	Pts	PIM	GP	G	A	Pts	PIM
1952–53	Galt Black Hawks	OHA	49	2	10	12	165	11	1	2	3	24
1953–54	Chicago Black Hawks	NHL	1	0	0	0	0	—	—	—	—	—
1953–54	Galt Black Hawks	OHA	55	5	17	22	127	—	—	—	—	—
1954–55	Belleville TPT's	EOHL	—	—	—	—	—	—	—	—	—	—
1955–56	Belleville TPT's	EOHL	34	4	15	19	88	—	—	—	—	—
1956–57	Buffalo Bisons	AHL	1	0	0	0	0	—	—	—	—	—
1956–57	Huntington Hornets	IHL	44	3	10	13	72	—	—	—	—	—
1956–57	Windsor Bulldogs	OHA Sr	9	0	3	3	16	12	0	4	4	45
1957–58	Buffalo Bisons	AHL	4	0	0	0	26	—	—	—	—	—
1957–58	Windsor Hornets	OHA Sr	31	2	4	6	53	—	—	—	—	—
1958–59	Buffalo Bisons	AHL	6	0	2	2	10	—	—	—	—	—
1958–59	Trois-Rivières Lions	QSHL	54	1	7	8	170	8	0	3	3	21
1959–60	Sault Thunderbirds	EPHL	40	3	14	17	60	—	—	—	—	—
1959–60	Calgary Stampeders	WHL	21	0	4	4	41	—	—	—	—	—
1959–60	Buffalo Bisons	AHL	4	0	1	1	6	—	—	—	—	—
1960–61	Sault Thunderbirds	EPHL	33	3	9	12	131	—	—	—	—	—
1960–61	Buffalo Bisons	AHL	40	0	5	5	53	4	0	1	1	33
1961–62	Sault Thunderbirds	EPHL	55	3	15	18	120	—	—	—	—	—
1961–62	Buffalo Bisons	AHL	—	—	—	—	—	2	0	0	0	0
1962–63	Buffalo Bisons	AHL	60	0	6	6	95	9	0	2	2	15
1963–64	Buffalo Bisons	AHL	63	1	9	10	123	—	—	—	—	—
1964–65	St. Louis Braves	CHL	13	1	3	4	27	—	—	—	—	—
1964–65	Buffalo Bisons	AHL	46	0	10	10	86	9	0	0	0	0
1965–66	Los Angeles Blades	WHL	68	0	7	7	102	—	—	—	—	—
1966–67	Baltimore Clippers	AHL	34	0	1	1	36	1	0	0	0	0
1967–68	Baltimore Clippers	AHL	39	1	5	6	59	—	—	—	—	—
1969–70	Belleville Mohawks	OHA Sr	7	0	2	2	16	—	—	—	—	—
AHL totals			297	2	39	41	494	25	0	3	3	48
NHL totals			1	0	0	0	0	—	—	—	—	—

== See also ==
- List of players who played only one game in the NHL
