= Matt Ravlich =

Canadian ice hockey player

- Born: July 12, 1938 (age 86); Sault Ste. Marie, Ontario, Canada
- Height: 5 ft 10 in (178 cm)
- Weight: 185 lb (84 kg; 13 st 3 lb)
- Position: Defence
- Shot: Left
- Played for: Boston Bruins; Detroit Red Wings; Chicago Black Hawks; Los Angeles Kings
- Playing career: 1954–1974

Matthew Joseph Ravlich (born July 12, 1938) is a Canadian retired ice hockey defenceman. He played in the National Hockey League for four teams between and 1962 and 1972.

== Playing career ==
Ravlich started his National Hockey League career with the Boston Bruins. He also played with the Detroit Red Wings, Chicago Black Hawks and Los Angeles Kings. His career lasted from 1962 to 1972.

== Career statistics ==
=== Regular season and playoffs ===
			Regular season					Playoffs
Season	Team	League	GP	G	A	Pts	PIM	GP	G	A	Pts	PIM
1954–55	Galt Black Hawks	OHA	3	1	1	2	0	—	—	—	—	—
1954–55	Woodstock Athletics	OHA-B	—	—	—	—	—	—	—	—	—	—
1955–56	St. Catharines Teepees	OHA	48	2	15	17	188	6	0	0	0	11
1956–57	St. Catharines Teepees	OHA	52	7	27	34	137	14	9	12	21	4
1957–58	St. Catharines Teepees	OHA	49	38	35	73	105	8	3	7	10	15
1958–59	Trois-Rivieres Lions	QHL	61	14	31	45	58	8	2	3	5	7
1959–60	Sault Thunderbirds	EPHL	70	18	37	55	94	—	—	—	—	—
1960–61	Sault Thunderbirds	EPHL	55	5	25	30	104	12	0	2	2	0
1961–62	Providence Reds	AHL	69	10	29	39	112	3	0	2	2	0
1962–63	Providence Reds	AHL	70	7	38	45	97	6	0	2	2	8
1962–63	Boston Bruins	NHL	2	1	0	1	0	—	—	—	—	—
1963–64	Providence Reds	AHL	69	8	31	39	79	3	2	2	4	2
1964–65	Buffalo Bisons	AHL	8	1	5	6	12	—	—	—	—	—
1964–65	Chicago Black Hawks	NHL	61	3	16	19	80	14	1	4	5	14
1965–66	Chicago Black Hawks	NHL	62	0	16	16	78	6	0	1	1	2
1966–67	Chicago Black Hawks	NHL	62	0	3	3	39	—	—	—	—	—
1967–68	Dallas Black Hawks	CHL	15	1	8	9	55	5	0	1	1	2
1967–68	Chicago Black Hawks	NHL	—	—	—	—	—	4	0	0	0	0
1968–69	Chicago Black Hawks	NHL	60	2	12	14	57	—	—	—	—	—
1968–69	Dallas Black Hawks	CHL	12	0	4	4	16	8	0	3	3	6
1969–70	Detroit Red Wings	NHL	46	0	6	6	33	—	—	—	—	—
1969–70	Los Angeles Kings	NHL	21	3	7	10	34	—	—	—	—	—
1970–71	Los Angeles Kings	NHL	66	3	16	19	41	—	—	—	—	—
1971–72	Seattle Totems	WHL	8	0	2	2	2	—	—	—	—	—
1971–72	Boston Bruins	NHL	25	0	1	1	2	—	—	—	—	—
1971–72	Boston Braves	AHL	20	1	6	7	14	8	1	3	4	14
1972–73	Boston Bruins	NHL	5	0	1	1	0	—	—	—	—	—
1972–73	Boston Braves	AHL	67	5	15	20	71	9	2	4	6	21
1973–74	Boston Braves	AHL	50	4	20	24	21	—	—	—	—	—
NHL totals			410	12	78	90	364	24	1	5	6	16
