= Roy Edwards (ice hockey) =

Canadian ice hockey player (1937–1999)

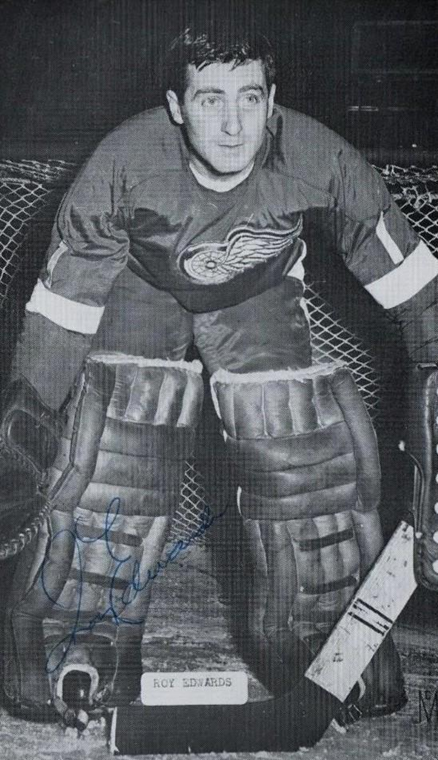
- Born: March 12, 1937 Haldimand County, Canada
- Died: August 16, 1999 (aged 62) Buffalo, New York, US
- Height: 5 ft 8 in (173 cm)
- Weight: 165 lb (75 kg; 11 st 11 lb)
- Position: Goaltender
- Caught: Right
- Played for: Detroit Red Wings; Pittsburgh Penguins
- Playing career: 1959–1974

Medal record

Representing Canada

World Championships
Gold medal – first place	1958 Oslo	

Allan Roy Edwards (March 12, 1937 – August 16, 1999) was a Canadian professional ice hockey goaltender who played 236 games in the National Hockey League with the Detroit Red Wings and the Pittsburgh Penguins between 1967 and 1973. Internationally, he played for the Canadian national team at the 1958 World Championships, winning the gold medal.

== Playing career ==
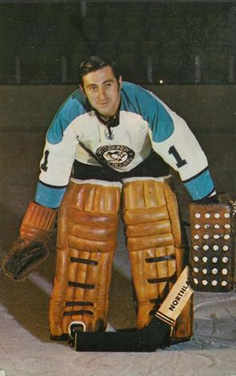
1971-72 postcard of Edwards for Pittsburgh Penguins

In 1958, at age 21, Edwards backstopped the Whitby Dunlops, Canada's representative, to the World Championships at Oslo, Norway. He posted a perfect 7–0 record in the eight-team round-robin tournament. In those seven games, Edwards played every minute. He recorded three shutouts and allowed six total goals to have a 0.86 goals-against average.

In 1960, he became property of the Chicago Black Hawks. His name was engraved on the Stanley Cup in 1961 even though he never played a single game for Chicago.

Edwards' road to the NHL was a long, winding one. In nine years, he played for seven teams in four leagues. On June 6, 1967, the Pittsburgh Penguins selected him in the expansion draft, but traded him to the Detroit Red Wings the very next day.

In 1967–68, Roger Crozier, the Red Wings' first-string goaltender, retired due to illness, and Edwards was called upon to take his place. He led the team in games and wins for four consecutive seasons.

A collision in 1970 with an opposing forward and the goalpost caused a hairline fracture in Edwards' skull, and this caused him headaches and dizzy spells. His health caused him to retire, but only briefly. He made a comeback with the Pittsburgh Penguins, and after one season there, he returned to the Wings. He had his best season in 1972–73: he won 27 games and led the NHL with six shutouts. The following season, he lost his first three games and retired for good.

== Personal life ==
Edwards was the uncle of Don Edwards, also an NHL goalie.

== Career statistics ==
=== Regular season and playoffs ===
			Regular season									Playoffs
Season	Team	League	GP	W	L	T	MIN	GA	SO	GAA	SV%	GP	W	L	MIN	GA	SO	GAA	SV%
1955–56	St. Catharines Teepees	OHA	41	26	12	3	2460	160	1	3.00	—	6	—	—	360	26	0	4.33	—
1956–57	St. Catharines Teepees	OHA	49	24	23	2	2940	179	3	3.65	—	14	—	—	840	55	1	3.93	—
1957–58	Whitby Dunlops	OHA Sr	7	—	—	—	420	21	0	3.00	—	—	—	—	—	—	—	—	—
1957–58	Fort Wayne Komets	IHL	25	—	—	—	1500	84	0	3.36	—	—	—	—	—	—	—	—	—
1958–59	Calgary Stampeders	WHL	63	42	20	1	3780	192	2	3.05	—	8	4	4	480	27	0	3.37	—
1959–60	Buffalo Bisons	AHL	72	33	35	4	4360	267	4	3.67	—	—	—	—	—	—	—	—	—
1960–61	Buffalo Bisons	AHL	30	12	16	1	1800	128	1	4.27	—	—	—	—	—	—	—	—	—
1960–61	Sault Thunderbirds	EPHL	37	16	15	6	2220	119	3	3.22	—	12	7	5	739	34	0	2.76	—
1961–62	Sault Thunderbirds	EPHL	36	4	26	6	2160	157	1	4.36	—	—	—	—	—	—	—	—	—
1961–62	Pittsburgh Hornets	AHL	10	1	8	1	600	52	0	5.20	—	—	—	—	—	—	—	—	—
1961–62	Portland Buckaroos	WHL	8	3	5	0	480	32	0	4.00	—	—	—	—	—	—	—	—	—
1962–63	Calgary Stampeders	WHL	70	23	44	2	4140	274	0	3.97	—	—	—	—	—	—	—	—	—
1962–63	Spokane Comets	WHL	1	0	1	0	60	3	0	3.00	—	—	—	—	—	—	—	—	—
1963–64	Buffalo Bisons	AHL	47	14	27	6	2820	155	2	3.30	—	—	—	—	—	—	—	—	—
1963–64	St. Louis Braves	CPHL	3	1	1	1	180	8	0	2.66	—	—	—	—	—	—	—	—	—
1964–65	St. Louis Braves	CPHL	65	12	47	6	3900	302	1	4.65	—	—	—	—	—	—	—	—	—
1965–66	Buffalo Bisons	AHL	40	15	22	2	2389	140	3	3.52	—	—	—	—	—	—	—	—	—
1966–67	Buffalo Bisons	AHL	39	9	24	5	2235	189	0	5.07	—	—	—	—	—	—	—	—	—
1967–68	Detroit Red Wings	NHL	41	14	17	5	2175	127	0	3.50	.884	—	—	—	—	—	—	—	—
1967–68	Fort Worth Wings	CPHL	9	8	0	1	540	12	4	1.33	—	—	—	—	—	—	—	—	—
1968–69	Detroit Red Wings	NHL	40	18	11	6	2098	89	4	2.55	.915	—	—	—	—	—	—	—	—
1968–69	Fort Worth Wings	CPHL	10	4	2	3	560	28	0	3.00	—	—	—	—	—	—	—	—	—
1969–70	Detroit Red Wings	NHL	47	24	15	6	2681	116	2	2.60	.915	4	0	3	205	11	0	3.23	.909
1970–71	Detroit Red Wings	NHL	37	11	19	7	2099	119	0	3.40	.893	—	—	—	—	—	—	—	—
1971–72	Pittsburgh Penguins	NHL	15	2	8	4	846	36	0	2.55	.907	—	—	—	—	—	—	—	—
1972–73	Detroit Red Wings	NHL	52	27	17	7	3005	132	6	2.64	.904	—	—	—	—	—	—	—	—
1973–74	Detroit Red Wings	NHL	4	0	3	0	186	18	0	5.82	.856	—	—	—	—	—	—	—	—
NHL totals			236	96	90	35	13,088	637	12	2.92	.902	4	0	3	205	11	0	3.23	.909

=== International ===
Year	Team	Event	GP	W	L	T	MIN	GA	SO	GAA	SV%
1958	Canada	WC	7	7	0	0	420	6	3	0.86	—
Senior totals			7	7	0	0	420	6	3	0.86	—
