= George Standing =

Canadian ice hockey player

- Born: August 3, 1941 (age 83); Toronto, Ontario, Canada
- Height: 5 ft 10 in (178 cm)
- Weight: 190 lb (86 kg; 13 st 8 lb)
- Position: Right wing
- Shot: Right
- Played for: Minnesota North Stars
- Playing career: 1962–1972

George Michael Standing (born August 3, 1941) is a Canadian former professional ice hockey player who played two games in the National Hockey League with the Minnesota North Stars during the 1967–68 season. The rest of his career, which lasted from 1962 to 1972, was spent in various minor leagues.

== Career statistics ==
=== Regular season and playoffs ===
			Regular season					Playoffs
Season	Team	League	GP	G	A	Pts	PIM	GP	G	A	Pts	PIM
1957–58	Toronto Marlboros	OHA	2	1	0	1	0	—	—	—	—	—
1958–59	Weston Dukes	MetJBHL	—	—	—	—	—	—	—	—	—	—
1958–59	Toronto Marlboros	OHA	26	1	2	3	18	—	—	—	—	—
1959–60	Toronto Marlboros	OHA	45	1	1	2	4	4	0	0	0	0
1960–61	Toronto Marlboros	OHA	48	18	24	42	69	—	—	—	—	—
1961–62	Guelph Royals	OHA	10	5	5	10	18	—	—	—	—	—
1961–62	St. Catharines Teepees	OHA	39	17	19	36	25	6	0	2	2	20
1961–62	North Bay Trappers	EPHL	1	0	0	0	2	—	—	—	—	—
1963–64	Nashville Dixie Flyers	EHL	72	20	33	53	39	3	0	0	0	0
1964–65	Nashville Dixie Flyers	EHL	67	54	34	88	79	13	4	10	14	4
1965–66	Nashville Dixie Flyers	EHL	72	30	36	66	36	11	4	5	9	4
1966–67	Nashville Dixie Flyers	EHL	72	47	40	87	46	14	14	8	22	4
1967–68	Minnesota North Stars	NHL	2	0	0	0	0	—	—	—	—	—
1967–68	Memphis South Stars	CHL	63	20	15	35	34	3	0	3	3	0
1968–69	Memphis South Stars	CHL	13	3	3	6	14	—	—	—	—	—
1968–69	Jacksonville Rockets	EHL	36	15	20	35	6	4	1	2	3	0
1969–70	Nashville Dixie Flyers	EHL	74	30	45	75	35	—	—	—	—	—
1970–71	Nashville Dixie Flyers	EHL	36	10	15	25	7	4	1	2	3	0
1971–72	St. Petersburg Suns	EHL	15	3	7	10	6	—	—	—	—	—
EHL totals			444	209	230	439	254	49	24	27	51	12
NHL totals			2	0	0	0	0	—	—	—	—	—
