= Gordie Haworth =

Canadian ice hockey player (1932–2019)

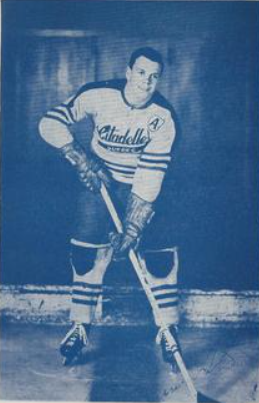
- Born: February 15, 1932 Drummondville, Quebec, Canada
- Died: September 2, 2019 (aged 87) Drummondville, Quebec, Canada
- Height: 5 ft 10 in (178 cm)
- Weight: 166 lb (75 kg; 11 st 12 lb)
- Position: Centre
- Shot: Left
- Played for: New York Rangers
- Playing career: 1949–1970

Gordon Joseph Haworth (February 15, 1932 – September 2, 2019) was a Canadian professional ice hockey player who played two games in the National Hockey League with the New York Rangers during the 1952–53 season. The rest of his career, which lasted from 1949 to 1970, was spent in the minor leagues. He was inducted into the Drummondville sports hall of fame in his hometown. He is the father of Alan Haworth and Carey Haworth. He died of cancer in 2019.

== Career statistics ==
=== Regular season and playoffs ===
			Regular season					Playoffs
Season	Team	League	GP	G	A	Pts	PIM	GP	G	A	Pts	PIM
1947–48	Drummondville College	HS-CA	—	—	—	—	—	—	—	—	—	—
1947–48	Drummondville Diggers	QUE U18	—	—	—	—	—	—	—	—	—	—
1948–49	Victoriaville Tigres	QJHL	46	9	13	22	36	4	0	1	1	6
1949–50	Quebec Citadelles	QJHL	—	—	—	—	—	—	—	—	—	—
1949–50	Atlantic City Sea Gulls	EAHL	7	0	1	1	2	—	—	—	—	—
1950–51	Quebec Citadelles	QJHL	46	27	30	57	43	13	5	3	8	8
1950–51	Barrie Flyers	M-Cup	—	—	—	—	—	10	5	5	10	14
1951–52	Quebec Citadelles	QJHL	46	31	51	82	49	15	7	6	13	19
1952–53	New York Rangers	NHL	2	0	1	1	0	—	—	—	—	—
1952–53	Valleyfield Braves	QSHL	53	9	21	30	26	4	0	1	1	2
1953–54	Valleyfield Braves	QSHL	69	24	28	52	64	6	1	0	1	0
1954–55	Valleyfield Braves	QSHL	60	16	32	48	33	—	—	—	—	—
1955–56	Springfield Indians	AHL	30	3	13	16	30	—	—	—	—	—
1955–56	Trois-Rivières Lions	QSHL	16	4	6	10	8	—	—	—	—	—
1956–57	Vancouver Canucks	WHL	64	17	35	52	26	3	0	0	0	0
1957–58	Vancouver Canucks	WHL	67	23	37	60	18	—	—	—	—	—
1958–59	Vancouver Canucks	WHL	65	21	52	73	32	3	2	0	2	0
1959–60	Vancouver Canucks	WHL	70	27	33	60	24	11	3	7	10	4
1960–61	Portland Buckaroos	WHL	68	18	47	65	24	14	3	3	6	0
1961–62	Sudbury Wolves	EPHL	63	14	41	55	32	5	2	1	3	4
1962–63	Los Angeles Blades	WHL	69	11	40	51	16	3	2	3	5	2
1963–64	Los Angeles Blades	WHL	68	17	36	53	24	12	2	7	9	4
1964–65	Los Angeles Blades	WHL	47	7	18	25	15	—	—	—	—	—
1965–66	Drummondville Eagles	QSHL	41	14	30	44	26	5	0	2	2	6
1966–67	Drummondville Eagles	QSHL	40	13	28	41	26	9	2	10	12	4
1966–67	Drummondville Eagles	Al-Cup	—	—	—	—	—	11	4	12	16	2
1967–68	Drummondville Eagles	QSHL	48	15	31	46	21	10	3	10	13	0
1969–70	Jacksonville Rockets	EHL	70	16	56	72	6	4	0	1	1	2
WHL totals			518	141	298	439	179	46	12	20	32	10
NHL totals			2	0	1	1	0	—	—	—	—	—
