= Billy Taylor (ice hockey, born 1942) =

Canadian ice hockey player

- Born: October 14, 1942 Kincaid, Saskatchewan, Canada
- Died: September 8, 1979 (aged 36) Guelph, Ontario, Canada
- Height: 6 ft 1 in (185 cm)
- Weight: 175 lb (79 kg; 12 st 7 lb)
- Position: Centre
- Shot: Left
- Played for: New York Rangers
- Playing career: 1960–1968

William Gordon Taylor (October 14, 1942 – September 8, 1979) was a professional ice hockey centre. He played two games in the National Hockey League with the New York Rangers during the 1964–65 season. The rest of his career, which lasted from 1960 to 1968, was spent in the minor leagues. He is the son of the former NHL hockey player, Billy Taylor Sr.

== Playing career ==
Taylor spent most of his playing career in various minor leagues on various teams from 1960 to 1968. He managed to play only two games in the NHL for the New York Rangers during the 1964–65 season, recording no points.

After retirement as a player, he spent one season, 1971–72, as a head coach for the Guelph CMC's of the Southern Ontario Junior A Hockey League. That season the CMC's went on to win the Manitoba Centennial Cup as National Tier II Junior "A" Champions under Taylor's watch.

Taylor died on September 8, 1979 aged 36 years in Guelph, Ontario.

== Career statistics ==
=== Regular season and playoffs ===
			Regular season					Playoffs
Season	Team	League	GP	G	A	Pts	PIM	GP	G	A	Pts	PIM
1958–59	Saint John's High School	HS-MA	6	10	5	15	—	—	—	—	—	—
1958–59	St John's Junior Guards	SJSHL	—	—	—	—	—	4	4	2	6	2
1959–60	Prince of Wales Collegiate	HS-CA	5	4	4	8	23	—	—	—	—	—
1959–60	St. John's Junior Guards	SJJHL	18	23	11	34	40	7	5	2	7	13
1959–60	St. John's All-Stars	NFLD Sr	—	—	—	—	—	2	1	2	3	0
1960–61	Guelph Royals	OHA	48	12	19	31	89	14	7	5	12	77
1961–62	Guelph Royals	OHA	38	20	26	46	81	—	—	—	—	—
1961–62	Kitchener Beavers	EPHL	2	0	0	0	0	—	—	—	—	—
1962–63	Guelph Royals	OHA	49	32	31	64	61	—	—	—	—	—
1962–63	Sudbury Wolves	EPHL	4	0	1	1	4	4	0	0	0	0
1963–64	St. Paul Rangers	CPHL	69	30	29	59	87	11	4	4	8	10
1964–65	New York Rangers	NHL	2	0	0	0	0	—	—	—	—	—
1964–65	Baltimore Clippers	AHL	5	1	1	2	4	—	—	—	—	—
1964–65	St. Paul Rangers	CPHL	43	17	24	41	65	—	—	—	—	—
1965–66	St. Louis Braves	CPHL	68	13	21	34	72	5	1	1	2	2
1966–67	Buffalo Bisons	AHL	63	9	26	35	38	—	—	—	—	—
1967–68	Memphis South Stars	CPHL	30	2	7	9	34	1	0	0	0	2
CPHL totals			210	62	81	143	258	17	5	5	10	14
NHL totals			2	0	0	0	0	—	—	—	—	—
