= George Blair (ice hockey) =

Canadian ice hockey player

George “Dusty” Blair
- Born: September 15, 1929 South Porcupine, Ontario, Canada
- Died: July 9, 2010 (aged 80) Fort Erie, Ontario, Canada
- Height: 5 ft 8 in (173 cm)
- Weight: 160 lb (73 kg; 11 st 6 lb)
- Position: Centre
- Shot: Left
- Played for: Toronto Maple Leafs
- Playing career: 1949–1965

George Johnston "Dusty" Blair (September 15, 1929 – July 9, 2010) was a Canadian professional hockey player. Dusty played two games in the National Hockey League with the Toronto Maple Leafs during the 1950–51 season. The rest of his career, which lasted from 1949 to 1965, was spent in various minor leagues.

== Career ==
Blair began his career when he signed with the Pittsburgh Hornets of the American Hockey League. He played with the Toronto Maple Leafs in the National Hockey Leaguefor two games, one more than his brother, Chuck Blair. He then went on to play in the OMHL, AHL, Maritime Major Hockey League, Quebec Senior Hockey League, Ontario Hockey Association, WHL, Eastern Professional Hockey League, and Eastern Hockey League. He retired with the Nashville Dixie Flyers after the 1964–65 season.

== Career statistics ==
=== Regular season and playoffs ===
| | | | Regular season | | | | | Playoffs |
| Season | Team | League | GP | G | A | Pts | PIM | GP | G | A | Pts | PIM |
|---|---|---|---|---|---|---|---|---|---|---|---|---|
| 1947–48 | Oshawa Generals | OHA | 36 | 17 | 13 | 30 | 17 | 6 | 0 | 3 | 3 | 5 |
| 1948–49 | Oshawa Generals | OHA | 46 | 23 | 26 | 49 | 15 | 2 | 1 | 1 | 2 | 0 |
| 1949–50 | Los Angeles Monarchs | PCHL | 44 | 18 | 14 | 32 | 10 | — | — | — | — | — |
| 1949–50 | Pittsburgh Hornets | AHL | 17 | 1 | 3 | 4 | 2 | — | — | — | — | — |
| 1950–51 | Toronto Maple Leafs | NHL | 2 | 0 | 0 | 0 | 0 | — | — | — | — | — |
| 1950–51 | St. Michael's Monarchs | OMHL | 23 | 11 | 13 | 24 | 4 | 9 | 4 | 2 | 6 | 4 |
| 1951–52 | St. John Beavers | MMHL | 60 | 31 | 33 | 64 | 6 | 10 | 7 | 7 | 14 | 0 |
| 1951–52 | Pittsburgh Hornets | AHL | 4 | 0 | 0 | 0 | 0 | — | — | — | — | — |
| 1952–53 | Smiths Falls Rideaus | OHA Sr | 45 | 22 | 43 | 65 | 11 | 10 | 2 | 8 | 10 | 2 |
| 1952–53 | Ottawa Senators | QSHL | 3 | 0 | 1 | 1 | 0 | — | — | — | — | — |
| 1952–53 | Smiths Falls Rideaus | Al-Cup | — | — | — | — | — | 11 | 3 | 9 | 12 | 0 |
| 1953–54 | Ottawa Senators | QSHL | 71 | 28 | 43 | 71 | 0 | 22 | 9 | 12 | 21 | 0 |
| 1954–55 | Buffalo Bisons | AHL | 64 | 18 | 31 | 49 | 6 | 10 | 3 | 1 | 4 | 0 |
| 1955–56 | Providence Reds | AHL | 55 | 18 | 16 | 34 | 6 | 9 | 1 | 12 | 13 | 0 |
| 1956–57 | Providence Reds | AHL | 59 | 9 | 24 | 33 | 4 | 5 | 1 | 1 | 2 | 2 |
| 1957–58 | Calgary Stampeders | WHL | 69 | 11 | 31 | 42 | 11 | 14 | 3 | 4 | 7 | 2 |
| 1958–59 | Calgary Stampeders | WHL | 53 | 14 | 13 | 27 | 4 | 8 | 3 | 1 | 4 | 0 |
| 1959–60 | Calgary Stampeders | WHL | 69 | 6 | 27 | 33 | 7 | — | — | — | — | — |
| 1960–61 | Sault Thunderbirds | EPHL | 66 | 11 | 23 | 34 | 20 | 10 | 1 | 1 | 2 | 0 |
| 1961–62 | Sault Thunderbirds | EPHL | 67 | 9 | 28 | 37 | 8 | — | — | — | — | — |
| 1962–63 | Clinton Comets | EHL | 65 | 17 | 44 | 61 | 4 | 13 | 2 | 9 | 11 | 0 |
| 1963–64 | Clinton Comets | EHL | 15 | 1 | 3 | 4 | 0 | — | — | — | — | — |
| 1963–64 | New Haven Blades | EHL | 21 | 2 | 7 | 9 | 0 | — | — | — | — | — |
| 1964–65 | Nashville Dixie Flyers | EHL | 66 | 13 | 42 | 55 | 141 | 13 | 4 | 8 | 12 | 0 |
| AHL totals | | | 199 | 46 | 74 | 120 | 18 | 24 | 5 | 14 | 19 | 2 |
| WHL totals | | | 191 | 31 | 71 | 102 | 22 | 22 | 6 | 5 | 11 | 2 |
| NHL totals | | | 2 | 0 | 0 | 0 | 0 | — | — | — | — | — |
