= Gord Strate =

Canadian ice hockey player

- Born: May 28, 1935 Edmonton, Alberta, Canada
- Died: September 5, 2012 (aged 77) Sherwood Park, Alberta, Canada
- Height: 6 ft 1 in (185 cm)
- Weight: 190 lb (86 kg; 13 st 8 lb)
- Position: Defence
- Shot: Left
- Played for: Detroit Red Wings
- Playing career: 1955–1962

Gordon Lynn Strate (May 28, 1935 – September 5, 2012) was a Canadian professional ice hockey player who played 61 games in the National Hockey League for the Detroit Red Wings as a defenceman between 1957 and 1959. The rest of his career, which lasted from 1955 to 1962, was spent in the minor leagues. He holds the record as the player to have played the most NHL games without recording a point.

== Post-playing career ==
After retiring from hockey, he owned a tire shop in Fort St. John, British Columbia. Gord and his wife eventually returned to Sherwood Park, Alberta, just outside his hometown, to retire. He was an active member of the Church of Jesus Christ of Latter-day Saints and died at the age of 77.

== Career statistics ==
=== Regular season and playoffs ===
			Regular season					Playoffs
Season	Team	League	GP	G	A	Pts	PIM	GP	G	A	Pts	PIM
1952–53	Edmonton Oil Kings	WCJHL	31	3	3	6	32	13	0	1	1	6
1953–54	Edmonton Oil Kings	WCJHL	33	1	7	8	41	10	3	3	6	12
1953–54	Edmonton Oil Kings	M-Cup	—	—	—	—	—	14	0	2	2	28
1954–55	Edmonton Oil Kings	WCJHL	40	6	12	18	55	3	0	0	0	2
1954–55	Edmonton Flyers	WHL	2	1	0	1	0	—	—	—	—	—
1955–56	Regina/Brandon Regals	WHL	60	0	6	6	64	—	—	—	—	—
1956–57	Detroit Red Wings	NHL	5	0	0	0	4	—	—	—	—	—
1956–57	Edmonton Flyers	WHL	64	0	15	15	33	8	0	0	0	0
1957–58	Detroit Red Wings	NHL	45	0	0	0	24	—	—	—	—	—
1957–58	Cleveland Barons	AHL	15	0	1	1	4	7	0	1	1	2
1958–59	Detroit Red Wings	NHL	11	0	0	0	6	—	—	—	—	—
1958–59	Hershey Bears	AHL	53	0	2	2	40	13	0	0	0	5
1959–60	Edmonton Flyers	WHL	69	1	8	9	47	4	1	0	1	0
1960–61	Sudbury Wolves	EPHL	14	0	3	3	10	—	—	—	—	—
1960–61	Edmonton Flyers	WHL	57	1	7	8	40	—	—	—	—	—
1961–62	Sudbury Wolves	EPHL	70	2	17	19	83	5	0	0	0	4
WHL totals			252	3	36	39	184	26	3	4	7	20
NHL totals			61	0	0	0	34	—	—	—	—	—
