= Joe Szura =

Canadian ice hockey player (1938–2006)

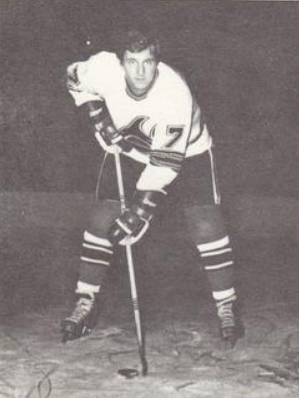
- Szura in 1972 photo
- Born: December 18, 1938 Fort William, Ontario, Canada
- Died: October 13, 2006 (aged 67)
- Height: 6 ft 3 in (191 cm)
- Weight: 185 lb (84 kg; 13 st 3 lb)
- Position: Centre
- Shot: Left
- Played for: Oakland Seals; Los Angeles Sharks; Houston Aeros
- Playing career: 1960–1975

Joseph Boleslaw Szura (December 18, 1938 – October 13, 2006) was a Canadian professional ice hockey forward who played 90 games in the National Hockey League for the Oakland Seals. Born in Fort William, Ontario, he played 115 games in the World Hockey Association for the Los Angeles Sharks and Houston Aeros.

== Career statistics ==
=== Regular season and playoffs ===
			Regular season					Playoffs
Season	Team	League	GP	G	A	Pts	PIM	GP	G	A	Pts	PIM
1956–57	Fort William Canadiens	TBJHL	30	27	36	63	14	8	3	4	7	0
1957–58	Fort William Canadiens	TBJHL	30	10	21	31	2	4	1	5	6	0
1958–59	Fort William Canadiens	TBJHL	30	13	27	40	20	—	—	—	—	—
1959–60	Montreal Royals	EPHL	40	7	11	18	8	—	—	—	—	—
1959–60	Hull-Ottawa Canadiens	EPHL	26	5	8	13	4	6	0	1	1	0
1960–61	Hull-Ottawa Canadiens	EPHL	65	10	24	34	20	—	—	—	—	—
1961–62	North Bay Trappers	EPHL	68	27	35	62	24	—	—	—	—	—
1962–63	Cleveland Barons	AHL	72	15	29	44	20	7	1	1	2	2
1963–64	Cleveland Barons	AHL	72	23	44	67	33	9	13	6	19	2
1964–65	Cleveland Barons	AHL	67	29	30	59	26	—	—	—	—	—
1965–66	Cleveland Barons	AHL	72	46	30	76	22	12	1	4	5	8
1966–67	Cleveland Barons	AHL	68	27	42	69	32	3	0	0	0	4
1967–68	Buffalo Bisons	AHL	43	13	22	35	16	5	3	1	4	2
1967–68	California/Oakland Seals	NHL	20	1	3	4	10	—	—	—	—	—
1968–69	Oakland Seals	NHL	70	9	12	21	20	7	2	3	5	2
1969–70	Providence Reds	AHL	72	21	46	67	23	—	—	—	—	—
1970–71	Providence Reds	AHL	70	21	53	74	39	10	5	6	11	23
1971–72	Baltimore Clippers	AHL	72	38	38	76	20	18	1	10	11	12
1972–73	Los Angeles Sharks	WHA	73	13	32	45	25	2	0	0	0	0
1973–74	Houston Aeros	WHA	42	8	7	15	4	10	0	0	0	0
1974–75	Cape Cod Codders	NAHL	10	3	2	5	0	4	0	1	1	0
WHA totals			115	21	39	60	29	12	0	0	0	0
NHL totals			90	10	15	25	30	7	2	3	5	2
