= Pierre Gagne =

Canadian ice hockey player (born 1940)

- Born: June 5, 1940 (age 84); North Bay, Ontario, Canada
- Height: 6 ft 1 in (185 cm)
- Weight: 180 lb (82 kg; 12 st 12 lb)
- Position: Left wing
- Shot: Left
- Played for: Boston Bruins
- Playing career: 1960–1970

Pierre Reynald Gagne (born June 5, 1940) is a Canadian former professional ice hockey left winger. He played 2 games in the National Hockey League with the Boston Bruins during the 1959–60 season. The rest of his career, which lasted from 1960 to 1970, was spent in various minor leagues.

== Playing career ==
Born in North Bay, Ontario, Gagne played two games for the Boston Bruins during the 1959–60 season, on March 19, 1960 against the Montreal Canadiens, and March 20 against the Chicago Black Hawks. He later moved to the Eastern Hockey League for the Clinton Comets and the New York Rovers. He played one game in the Eastern Professional Hockey League for the North Bay Trappers before moving to the International Hockey League with the Fort Wayne Komets.

Gagne moved on to play for the University of Ottawa and the Quebec senior league before moving to the Providence Reds of the American Hockey League for three years. He then returned to the EHL with the Nashville Dixie Flyers. He spent the final two years of his career playing for Dalhousie University before retiring.

== Personal life ==
Gagne is the father of Bill Gagne.

== Career statistics ==
=== Regular season and playoffs ===
			Regular season					Playoffs
Season	Team	League	GP	G	A	Pts	PIM	GP	G	A	Pts	PIM
1958–59	Barrie Flyers	OHA	54	20	18	38	10	6	1	4	5	14
1959–60	Barrie Flyers	OHA	48	32	34	66	14	6	6	3	9	6
1959–60	Boston Bruins	NHL	2	0	0	0	0	—	—	—	—	—
1960–61	Clinton Comets	EHL	16	5	9	14	24	—	—	—	—	—
1960–61	New York Rovers	EHL	29	5	10	15	7	—	—	—	—	—
1961–62	North Bay Trappers	EPHL	1	0	0	0	0	—	—	—	—	—
1961–62	Fort Wayne Komets	IHL	59	19	32	51	39	—	—	—	—	—
1962–63	University of Ottawa	OQAA	—	—	—	—	—	—	—	—	—	—
1963–64	University of Ottawa	OQAA	—	—	—	—	—	—	—	—	—	—
1964–65	Hull Volants	QUE Sr	—	—	—	—	—	—	—	—	—	—
1965–66	Hull Volants	QUE Sr	—	—	—	—	—	—	—	—	—	—
1966–67	Providence Reds	AHL	70	20	21	41	18	—	—	—	—	—
1966–67	New Haven Blades	EHL	18	1	3	4	8	—	—	—	—	—
1967–68	Providence Reds	AHL	28	5	13	18	6	5	0	0	0	2
1968–69	Providence Reds	AHL	67	17	22	39	18	9	3	5	8	4
1969–70	Nashville Dixie Flyers	EHL	67	41	44	85	35	—	—	—	—	—
1970–71	Dalhousie University	CIAU	18	27	35	62	16	—	—	—	—	—
1971–72	Dalhousie University	CIAU	18	10	24	34	70	—	—	—	—	—
AHL totals			165	42	56	98	42	14	3	5	8	6
NHL totals			2	0	0	0	0	—	—	—	—	—
