= Cliff Pennington (ice hockey) =

Canadian ice hockey player (1940–2020)

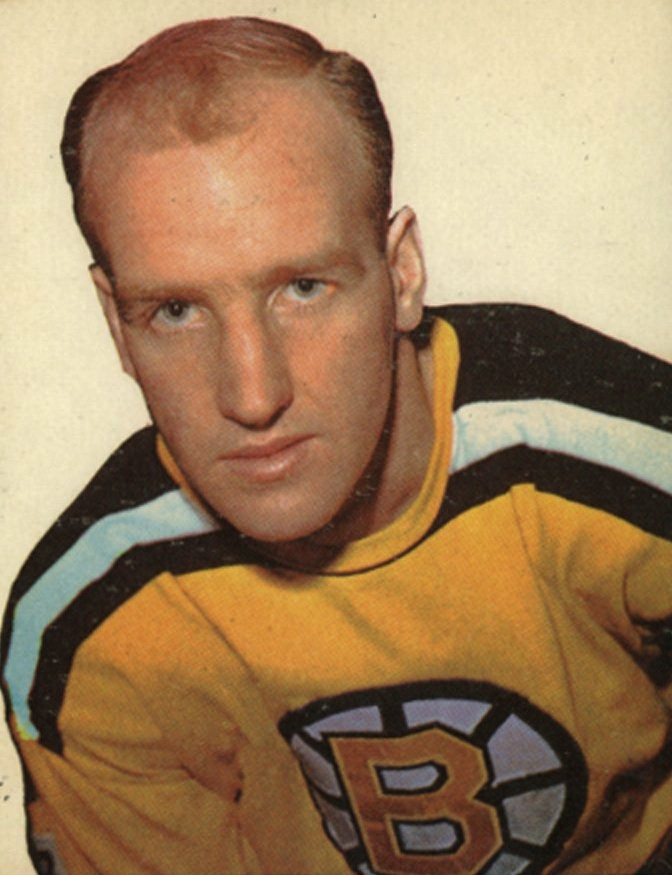
- Born: April 18, 1940 Winnipeg, Manitoba, Canada
- Died: May 26, 2020 (aged 80) St. Petersburg, Florida, US
- Height: 6 ft 0 in (183 cm)
- Weight: 170 lb (77 kg; 12 st 2 lb)
- Position: Centre
- Shot: Right
- Played for: Montreal Canadiens; Boston Bruins
- Playing career: 1959–1973

Olympic medal record

Men's Ice hockey

Representing Canada
Silver medal – second place	1960 Squaw Valley	Ice hockey

Clifford Raymond Pennington (April 18, 1940 – May 26, 2020) was a Canadian professional ice hockey forward who played 102 games in the National Hockey League for the Montreal Canadiens and Boston Bruins between 1961 and 1962. Internationally Pennington played for the Canadian national team at the 1960 Winter Olympics, winning a silver medal. He died in 2020.

== Career statistics ==
=== Regular season and playoffs ===
			Regular season					Playoffs
Season	Team	League	GP	G	A	Pts	PIM	GP	G	A	Pts	PIM
1955–56	St. Boniface Canadiens	MJHL	1	1	1	2	0	1	1	1	2	0
1955–56	St. Boniface Canadiens	M-Cup	—	—	—	—	—	4	1	0	1	2
1956–57	St. Boniface Canadiens	MJHL	30	28	27	55	2	7	3	1	4	0
1957–58	Flin Flon Bombers	SJHL	47	32	39	71	8	12	12	5	17	0
1958–59	Flin Flon Bombers	SJHL	48	62	50	112	116	12	7	9	16	15
1958–59	Winnipeg Warriors	WHL	5	4	1	5	0	—	—	—	—	—
1958–59	Flin Flon Bombers	M-Cup	—	—	—	—	—	10	10	10	20	4
1959–60	Kitchener-Waterloo Dutchmen	OHA	47	23	28	51	5	6	4	6	10	0
1959–60	Winnipeg Warriors	WHL	2	1	1	2	2	—	—	—	—	—
1959–60	Flin Flon Bombers	SJHL	—	—	—	—	—	1	0	0	0	0
1959–60	Flin Flon Bombers	M-Cup	—	—	—	—	—	5	9	4	13	6
1959–60	Edmonton Oil Kings	M-Cup	—	—	—	—	—	6	6	2	8	0
1960–61	Montreal Canadiens	NHL	4	1	0	1	0	—	—	—	—	—
1960–61	Hull-Ottawa Canadiens	EPHL	65	33	69	102	10	14	4	11	15	0
1961–62	Boston Bruins	NHL	70	9	32	41	2	—	—	—	—	—
1962–63	Boston Bruins	NHL	28	7	10	17	4	—	—	—	—	—
1962–63	Kingston Frontenacs	EPHL	39	21	41	62	6	5	2	9	11	0
1963–64	San Francisco Seals	WHL	26	6	15	21	4	—	—	—	—	—
1963–64	Quebec Aces	AHL	43	11	19	30	2	7	1	1	2	0
1964–65	Verdun Pirates	QSHL	—	—	—	—	—	—	—	—	—	—
1965–66	Los Angeles Blades	WHL	36	6	8	14	6	—	—	—	—	—
1966–67	Florida Rockets	EHL	64	37	49	86	2	—	—	—	—	—
1967–68	Nashville Dixie Flyers	EHL	68	49	66	115	18	4	3	3	6	0
1968–69	Nashville Dixie Flyers	EHL	72	59	58	117	26	14	6	11	17	4
1969–70	Des Moines Oak Leafs	IHL	72	43	57	100	6	3	1	2	3	0
1970–71	Des Moines Oak Leafs	IHL	54	22	42	64	8	—	—	—	—	—
1971–72	St. Petersburg Suns	EHL	66	25	56	81	61	2	1	2	3	2
1972–73	Suncoast Suns	EHL	48	25	47	72	10	—	—	—	—	—
1973–74	Suncoast Suns	EHL	5	0	5	5	0	—	—	—	—	—
EHL totals			318	195	276	471	117	20	10	16	26	6
NHL totals			102	17	42	59	6	—	—	—	—	—

=== International ===
Year	Team	Event	GP	G	A	Pts	PIM
1960	Canada	Ice hockey at the Olympics	4	0	2	2	6
Senior totals			4	0	2	2	6

== Awards and achievements ==
- Turnbull Cup MJHL Championship (1956)
- EPHL Championships (1961 & 1963)
- EPHL First All-Star Team (1962)
- EHL South First All-Star Team (1969)
- IHL First All-Star Team (1970)
- IHL MVP (1970)
- Honoured Member of the Manitoba Hockey Hall of Fame
