= Doug Senior =

Canadian ice hockey player

- Born: January 4, 1941 (age 85) Kingston, Ontario, Canada
- Height: 5 ft 7 in (170 cm)
- Weight: 180 lb (82 kg; 12 st 12 lb)
- Position: Left wing
- Shot: Left
- Played for: EPHL; Hull-Ottawa Canadiens; North Bay Trappers; CPHL; Omaha Knights; Memphis South Stars; AHL; Cleveland Barons; Providence Reds; Quebec Aces; WHL; California Seals
- Playing career: 1961–1970

Doug Senior (born January 4, 1941) is a Canadian former professional ice hockey player.

== Career ==
Senior played junior hockey with the TPT Petes of the Ontario Hockey Association, turning professional in 1961 with the Hull-Ottawa Canadiens of the Eastern Professional Hockey League. He went on to play nine seasons of professional hockey, winning the 1964 Adams Cup with the Omaha Knights in the Central Professional Hockey League's inaugural season and playing parts of five seasons in the American Hockey League.
