= Bill Speer =

Canadian ice hockey player

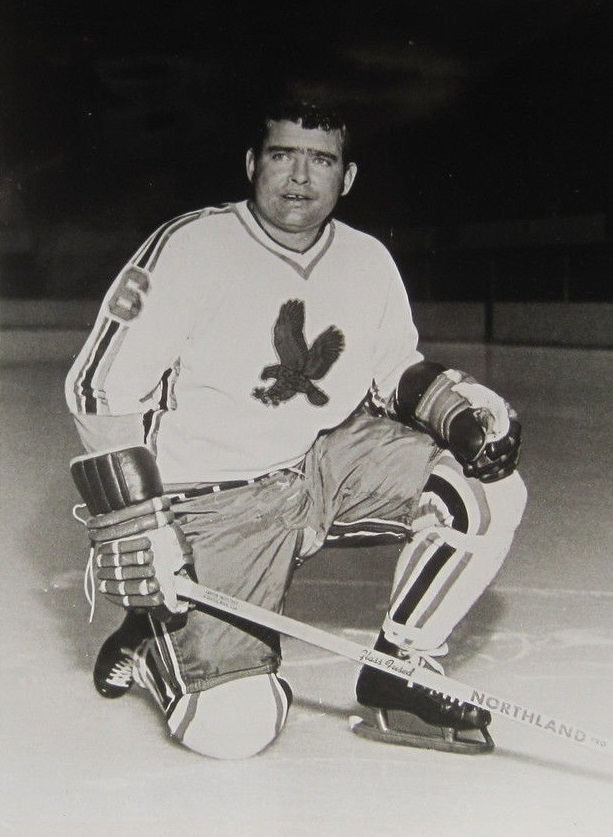
- Speer with the Salt Lake Golden Eagles, 1969–70
- Born: March 20, 1942 Lindsay, Ontario, Canada
- Died: March 12, 1989 (aged 46) Fenelon Falls, Ontario, Canada
- Height: 5 ft 11 in (180 cm)
- Weight: 201 lb (91 kg; 14 st 5 lb)
- Position: Defense
- Shot: Left
- Played for: Pittsburgh Penguins; Boston Bruins; New York Raiders; New York Golden Blades; Jersey Knights
- Playing career: 1961–1975

Francis William Speer (March 20, 1942 – March 12, 1989) was a Canadian professional ice hockey player. He played in the National Hockey League and World Hockey Association between 1967 and 1974. He won the Stanley Cup with the Boston Bruins in 1970.

== Career ==
Speer played 135 games in the World Hockey Association and 130 games in the National Hockey League. Born in Lindsay, Ontario, he played for the Boston Bruins, Pittsburgh Penguins, New York Raiders, New York Golden Blades, and Jersey Knights. Speer was known as a solid, shot-blocking defenseman throughout his career.

Speer was known for his weight issues during his hockey career. Although generally listed as 5' 11" and 200 pounds throughout his career, his regularly played closer to 210 pounds and even weighed as much as 242 pounds during the 1966–67 offseason. Speer was able to lose most of the weight, dropping down to 210 for the opening of Penguins' training camp and even dropping as low as 206.

During his time with the Pittsburgh Penguins, he was also the designated team barber, setting up a makeshift barbershop in the wash room of the Penguins' dressing room in the Civic Arena. Speer became a barber at the age of 15 and took over his father's shop in 1967 after his father died. Although he never mentioned a specific fee for the haircuts, Speer did say that a 25-cent tip was standard. Speer earned the nickname "The Lindsay Clipper" during his time with the Bruins. After his playing days were over, some of his former teammates would visit the shop from time to time.

Speer won the Stanley Cup with the Boston Bruins in 1970, scoring one goal that season. It occurred on February 11, 1970, in Boston's 3–2 victory at St. Louis. It was the last NHL goal of Speer's career.

== Death ==
Speer died on February 12, 1989, while riding his snowmobile on a lake in Fenelon Falls, Ontario. The snowmobile plunged through the thin ice, and Speer drowned. He was 46 years old.

Speer is buried in Riverside Cemetery in Lindsay, Ontario.

== Career statistics ==
=== Regular season and playoffs ===
			Regular season					Playoffs
Season	Team	League	GP	G	A	Pts	PIM	GP	G	A	Pts	PIM
1959–60	St. Catharines Teepees	OHA	43	1	6	7	53	16	0	1	1	10
1959–60	St. Catharines Teepees	M-Cup	—	—	—	—	—	14	4	0	4	0
1960–61	St. Catharines Teepees	OHA	42	5	22	27	70	6	0	2	2	8
1961–62	St. Catharines Teepees	OHA	38	6	24	30	96	6	0	0	0	8
1961–62	Sault Thunderbirds	EPHL	4	0	0	0	2	—	—	—	—	—
1962–63	Knoxville Knights	EHL	68	10	44	54	46	5	1	0	1	4
1963–64	Springfield Indians	AHL	28	2	4	6	10	—	—	—	—	—
1964–65	Cleveland Barons	AHL	71	4	16	20	54	—	—	—	—	—
1965–66	Cleveland Barons	AHL	70	3	16	19	36	12	2	2	4	6
1966–67	Buffalo Bisons	AHL	64	6	25	31	52	—	—	—	—	—
1967–68	Pittsburgh Penguins	NHL	68	3	13	16	44	—	—	—	—	—
1967–68	Baltimore Clippers	AHL	5	0	5	5	8	—	—	—	—	—
1968–69	Pittsburgh Penguins	NHL	34	1	4	5	27	—	—	—	—	—
1968–69	Baltimore Clippers	AHL	13	1	4	5	21	—	—	—	—	—
1968–69	Amarillo Wranglers	CHL	7	1	1	2	14	—	—	—	—	—
1969–70	Boston Bruins	NHL	27	1	3	4	4	8	1	0	1	4
1969–70	Salt Lake Golden Eagles	WHL	19	1	3	4	47	—	—	—	—	—
1970–71	Boston Bruins	NHL	1	0	0	0	4	—	—	—	—	—
1970–71	Hershey Bears	AHL	27	2	6	8	42	—	—	—	—	—
1970–71	Providence Reds	AHL	25	3	19	22	35	10	1	6	7	6
1971–72	Boston Braves	AHL	7	0	0	0	2	—	—	—	—	—
1971–72	Providence Reds	AHL	52	5	27	32	36	5	2	2	4	8
1972–73	New York Raiders	WHA	69	3	23	26	40	—	—	—	—	—
1973–74	New York Golden Blades/Jersey Knights	WHA	66	1	3	4	30	—	—	—	—	—
1974–75	Orillia Terriers	OHA Sr	13	0	11	11	18	—	—	—	—	—
WHA totals			135	4	26	30	70	—	—	—	—	—
NHL totals			130	5	20	25	79	8	1	0	1	4
