= Mike Chernoff (ice hockey) =

Canadian ice hockey player

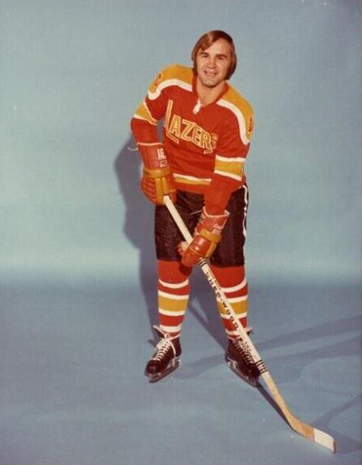
- Chernoff in 1973 photo
- Born: May 13, 1946 Yorkton, Saskatchewan, Canada
- Died: November 13, 2011 (aged 65) Moose Jaw, Saskatchewan, Canada
- Height: 5 ft 10 in (178 cm)
- Weight: 175 lb (79 kg; 12 st 7 lb)
- Position: Left wing
- Shot: Left
- Played for: Minnesota North Stars; Vancouver Blazers
- Playing career: 1966–1975

Michael Terence Chernoff (May 13, 1946 — November 13, 2011) was a Canadian ice hockey left winger. He played one game in the National Hockey League for the Minnesota North Stars, on December 15, 1968, and 39 games in the WHA for the Vancouver Blazers during the 1973–74 and 1974–75 seasons.

== Career statistics ==
=== Regular season and playoffs ===
			Regular season					Playoffs
Season	Team	League	GP	G	A	Pts	PIM	GP	G	A	Pts	PIM
1963–64	Moose Jaw Canucks	SJHL	62	7	14	21	170	5	0	1	1	6
1964–65	Moose Jaw Canucks	SJHL	52	22	25	47	106	—	—	—	—	—
1965–66	Moose Jaw Canucks	SJHL	60	42	34	76	106	2	0	1	1	0
1966–67	St. Louis Braves	CHL	70	14	16	30	55	—	—	—	—	—
1967–68	Dallas Black Hawks	CHL	31	8	7	15	41	—	—	—	—	—
1968–69	Memphis South Stars	CHL	68	20	31	51	48	—	—	—	—	—
1968–69	Minnesota North Stars	NHL	1	0	0	0	0	—	—	—	—	—
1969–70	Iowa Stars	CHL	69	36	39	75	29	11	7	4	11	6
1970–71	Cleveland Barons	AHL	72	31	23	54	37	8	3	1	4	2
1971–72	Cleveland Barons	AHL	71	8	13	21	30	6	0	0	0	0
1972–73	Cleveland/Jacksonville Barons	AHL	76	35	33	68	37	—	—	—	—	—
1973–74	Roanoke Valley Rebels	SHL	4	2	4	6	7	—	—	—	—	—
1973–74	Vancouver Blazers	WHA	36	11	10	21	4	—	—	—	—	—
1974–75	Tulsa Oilers	CHL	20	7	12	19	25	—	—	—	—	—
1974–75	Vancouver Blazers	WHA	3	0	0	0	0	—	—	—	—	—
1974–75	Johnstown Jets	NAHL	41	9	19	28	32	14	8	6	14	0
WHA totals			39	11	10	21	4	—	—	—	—	—
NHL totals			1	0	0	0	0	—	—	—	—	—

== See also ==
- List of players who played only one game in the NHL
