= North Bay Trappers =

North Bay Trappers may refer to:

- North Bay Trappers (1962–1982), defunct Canadian junior ice hockey team
- North Bay Trappers (1988–), Canadian junior ice hockey team in the Northern Ontario Junior Hockey League
- North Bay Trappers (EPHL), defunct Canadian ice hockey team in the Eastern Professional Hockey League
