= Fern Rivard =

Canadian ice hockey player

- Born: January 18, 1946 Grand-Mère, Quebec, Canada
- Died: July 31, 1993 (aged 47) Quebec City, Quebec, Canada
- Height: 5 ft 9 in (175 cm)
- Weight: 160 lb (73 kg; 11 st 6 lb)
- Position: Goaltender
- Caught: Left
- Played for: Minnesota North Stars
- Playing career: 1964–1975

Fernand Joseph Rivard (January 18, 1946 – July 31, 1993) was a Canadian professional ice hockey player. He played in 55 National Hockey League games with the Minnesota North Stars from 1968 to 1975. The rest of his career, which lasted from 1964 to 1975, was spent in the minor leagues.

== Career statistics ==
=== Regular season and playoffs ===
| | | | Regular season | | | | | | | | | Playoffs |
| Season | Team | League | GP | W | L | T | MIN | GA | SO | GAA | SV% | GP | W | L | MIN | GA | SO | GAA | SV% |
|---|---|---|---|---|---|---|---|---|---|---|---|---|---|---|---|---|---|---|---|
| 1961–62 | Quebec Citadelles | QPJHL | 6 | — | — | — | 360 | 22 | 0 | 3.67 | — | — | — | — | — | — | — | — | — |
| 1962–63 | Quebec Citadelles | QPJHL | — | — | — | — | — | — | — | — | — | — | — | — | — | — | — | — | — |
| 1963–64 | Quebec Aces | AHL | 1 | 1 | 0 | 0 | 60 | 2 | 0 | 2.00 | — | — | — | — | — | — | — | — | — |
| 1963–64 | Quebec Citadelles | QPJHL | — | — | — | — | — | — | — | — | — | 7 | 3 | 4 | 420 | 40 | 0 | 5.71 | — |
| 1964–65 | Thetford Mines Aces | QJHL | 19 | 12 | 7 | 0 | 1140 | 69 | 1 | 3.63 | — | — | — | — | — | — | — | — | — |
| 1964–65 | Montreal Junior Canadiens | OHA | — | — | — | — | — | — | — | — | — | 7 | — | — | 400 | 30 | 0 | 4.50 | — |
| 1965–66 | Peterborough Petes | OHA | 15 | — | — | — | 880 | 61 | 0 | 4.16 | — | 1 | 0 | 1 | 60 | 7 | 0 | 7.00 | — |
| 1966–67 | Muskegon Mohawks | IHL | 68 | — | — | — | 4080 | 265 | 1 | 3.91 | — | — | — | — | — | — | — | — | — |
| 1967–68 | Quebec Aces | AHL | 46 | 19 | 16 | 7 | 2529 | 132 | 0 | 3.13 | — | 11 | — | — | 614 | 36 | 0 | 3.52 | — |
| 1968–69 | Minnesota North Stars | NHL | 13 | 0 | 6 | 4 | 649 | 48 | 0 | 4.44 | .859 | — | — | — | — | — | — | — | — |
| 1968–69 | Memphis South Stars | CHL | 29 | — | — | — | 1682 | 101 | 2 | 3.53 | — | — | — | — | — | — | — | — | — |
| 1969–70 | Minnesota North Stars | NHL | 14 | 3 | 5 | 5 | 800 | 42 | 1 | 3.15 | .909 | — | — | — | — | — | — | — | — |
| 1969–70 | Iowa Stars | CHL | 18 | 9 | 5 | 4 | 1050 | 61 | 1 | 3.49 | — | 7 | 3 | 4 | 415 | 24 | 1 | 3.47 | — |
| 1970–71 | Cleveland Barons | AHL | 36 | 15 | 14 | 4 | 2047 | 102 | 2 | 2.98 | — | 1 | 0 | 1 | 60 | 6 | 0 | 6.00 | — |
| 1971–72 | Cleveland Barons | AHL | 40 | 12 | 19 | 5 | 2199 | 118 | 1 | 3.21 | — | 4 | 1 | 2 | 173 | 11 | 0 | 3.82 | — |
| 1972–73 | Jacksonville Barons | AHL | 65 | — | — | — | 3643 | 250 | 2 | 4.11 | — | — | — | — | — | — | — | — | — |
| 1973–74 | Minnesota North Stars | NHL | 13 | 3 | 6 | 2 | 701 | 50 | 1 | 4.28 | .869 | — | — | — | — | — | — | — | — |
| 1973–74 | New Haven Nighthawks | AHL | 12 | 7 | 3 | 2 | 700 | 41 | 2 | 3.51 | — | — | — | — | — | — | — | — | — |
| 1974–75 | Minnesota North Stars | NHL | 15 | 3 | 9 | 0 | 707 | 50 | 0 | 4.25 | .883 | — | — | — | — | — | — | — | — |
| 1974–75 | New Haven Nighthawks | AHL | 7 | 1 | 4 | 1 | 404 | 26 | 0 | 3.86 | — | — | — | — | — | — | — | — | — |
| NHL totals | | | 55 | 9 | 26 | 11 | 2856 | 190 | 2 | 3.99 | .882 | — | — | — | — | — | — | — | — |
