= Cliff Pennington =

Cliff Pennington may refer to:

- Cliff Pennington (ice hockey) (1940–2020), Canadian ice hockey forward
- Cliff Pennington (baseball) (born 1984), Major League Baseball infielder
