= Chuck Scherza =

Canadian ice hockey player

- Born: February 15, 1923 Brandon, Manitoba, Canada
- Died: March 16, 2014 (aged 91) Pawtucket, Rhode Island, U.S.
- Height: 5 ft 10 in (178 cm)
- Weight: 190 lb (86 kg; 13 st 8 lb)
- Position: Centre
- Shot: Right
- Played for: Boston Bruins; New York Rangers
- Playing career: 1943–1959

Charles Henry Scherza (February 15, 1923 – March 16, 2014) was a Canadian professional ice hockey player. He played 36 games in the National Hockey League with the Boston Bruins and New York Rangers between 1943 and 1945. The rest of his career, which lasted from 1943 to 1959, was mainly spent in the American Hockey League, where he played 11 seasons, winning a Calder Cup championship with the Providence Reds in 1949. He was born in Brandon, Manitoba and died on March 16, 2014, at the age of 91.

== Career statistics ==
=== Regular season and playoffs ===
| | | | Regular season | | | | | Playoffs |
| Season | Team | League | GP | G | A | Pts | PIM | GP | G | A | Pts | PIM |
|---|---|---|---|---|---|---|---|---|---|---|---|---|
| 1941–42 | Regina Abbotts | S-SJHL | 12 | 7 | 7 | 14 | 8 | 5 | 1 | 2 | 3 | 6 |
| 1941–42 | Regina Abbotts | M-Cup | — | — | — | — | — | 9 | 8 | 5 | 13 | 16 |
| 1942–43 | Oshawa Generals | OHA | 21 | 8 | 5 | 13 | 26 | 21 | 14 | 6 | 20 | 12 |
| 1943–44 | Boston Bruins | NHL | 9 | 1 | 1 | 2 | 6 | — | — | — | — | — |
| 1943–44 | New York Rangers | NHL | 5 | 3 | 2 | 5 | 11 | — | — | — | — | — |
| 1944–45 | New York Rangers | NHL | 22 | 2 | 3 | 5 | 18 | — | — | — | — | — |
| 1944–45 | Hershey Bears | AHL | 27 | 6 | 3 | 9 | 29 | 11 | 1 | 6 | 7 | 8 |
| 1945–46 | Providence Reds | AHL | 61 | 15 | 27 | 42 | 81 | 2 | 0 | 0 | 0 | 0 |
| 1946–47 | Providence Reds | AHL | 64 | 21 | 36 | 57 | 78 | — | — | — | — | — |
| 1947–48 | Providence Reds | AHL | 68 | 18 | 65 | 83 | 72 | 5 | 1 | 0 | 1 | 2 |
| 1948–49 | Providence Reds | AHL | 68 | 14 | 13 | 27 | 54 | 14 | 0 | 4 | 4 | 7 |
| 1949–50 | Providence Reds | AHL | 63 | 6 | 10 | 16 | 41 | 4 | 0 | 0 | 0 | 0 |
| 1950–51 | Providence Reds | AHL | 69 | 13 | 26 | 39 | 33 | — | — | — | — | — |
| 1951–52 | Providence Reds | AHL | 68 | 11 | 9 | 20 | 32 | 15 | 1 | 2 | 3 | 2 |
| 1952–53 | Providence Reds | AHL | 59 | 9 | 37 | 46 | 40 | — | — | — | — | — |
| 1953–54 | Providence Reds | AHL | 67 | 18 | 47 | 65 | 50 | — | — | — | — | — |
| 1954–55 | Providence Reds | AHL | 62 | 14 | 27 | 41 | 58 | — | — | — | — | — |
| 1955–56 | Trois-Rivieres Lions | QHL | 49 | 14 | 23 | 37 | 42 | — | — | — | — | — |
| 1956–57 | North Bay Trappers | NOHA | 47 | 13 | 33 | 46 | 64 | 13 | 1 | 12 | 13 | 14 |
| 1957–58 | North Bay Trappers | OHA Sr | 6 | 1 | 4 | 5 | 6 | — | — | — | — | — |
| 1958–59 | North Bay Trappers | OHA Sr | 12 | 1 | 4 | 5 | 8 | — | — | — | — | — |
| AHL totals | | | 676 | 145 | 300 | 445 | 568 | 51 | 3 | 12 | 15 | 19 |
| NHL totals | | | 36 | 6 | 6 | 12 | 35 | — | — | — | — | — |

== Awards and achievements ==
- Calder Cup (AHL) Championship (1949)
- Honoured Member of the Manitoba Hockey Hall of Fame
- Enshrined in the Rhode Island Hockey Hall of Fame in 2024
