= Dan Seguin =

Canadian ice hockey player

- Born: June 7, 1948 (age 78) Sudbury, Ontario, Canada
- Height: 5 ft 8 in (173 cm)
- Weight: 165 lb (75 kg; 11 st 11 lb)
- Position: Left wing
- Shot: Left
- Played for: Vancouver Canucks; Minnesota North Stars
- Playing career: 1968–1977

Daniel Seguin (born June 7, 1948) is a Canadian former professional ice hockey player who played 37 games in the National Hockey League for the Vancouver Canucks and Minnesota North Stars between 1970 and 1974. He also played several years in the minor Central Hockey League, Western Hockey League, and American Hockey League, in a professional career that last from 1968 to 1977.

His son, Brett, was selected by the Los Angeles Kings in the 1991 NHL entry draft, but never played in the NHL.

== Career statistics ==
=== Regular season and playoffs ===
			Regular season					Playoffs
Season	Team	League	GP	G	A	Pts	PIM	GP	G	A	Pts	PIM
1964–65	Kitchener Greenshirts	CJBHL	—	—	—	—	—	—	—	—	—	—
1964–65	Kitchener Rangers	OHA	1	0	0	0	0	—	—	—	—	—
1965–66	Kitchener Greenshirts	CJBHL	—	—	—	—	—	—	—	—	—	—
1966–67	Kitchener Rangers	OHA	48	13	32	45	78	13	1	3	4	21
1967–68	Kitchener Rangers	OHA	43	20	49	69	65	10	10	15	25	62
1968–69	Memphis South Stars	CHL	72	25	32	57	60	—	—	—	—	—
1969–70	Iowa Stars	CHL	72	20	49	69	43	10	3	7	10	12
1970–71	Minnesota North Stars	NHL	11	1	1	2	4	—	—	—	—	—
1970–71	Vancouver Canucks	NHL	25	0	5	5	46	—	—	—	—	—
1970–71	Rochester Americans	AHL	14	3	3	6	4	—	—	—	—	—
1971–72	Rochester Americans	AHL	66	15	24	39	82	—	—	—	—	—
1972–73	Seattle Totems	WHL	72	32	47	79	66	—	—	—	—	—
1973–74	Vancouver Canucks	NHL	1	1	0	1	0	—	—	—	—	—
1973–74	Seattle Totems	WHL	67	26	35	61	54	—	—	—	—	—
1974–75	Seattle Totems	CHL	73	37	47	84	26	—	—	—	—	—
1975–76	Tulsa Oilers	CHL	62	22	28	50	56	—	—	—	—	—
1976–77	Rhode Island Reds	AHL	80	27	37	64	31	—	—	—	—	—
1977–78	EV Landshut	GER	37	20	26	46	63	—	—	—	—	—
1978–79	Stratford Perths	OHA-Sr	42	30	48	78	—	—	—	—	—	—
1979–80	Stratford Combines	OHA-Sr	40	30	64	94	—	—	—	—	—	—
NHL totals			37	2	6	8	50	—	—	—	—	—
