= Memphis South Stars =

- City: Memphis, Tennessee
- League: Central Professional Hockey League
- Founded: 1967
- Operated: 1967 to 1969
- Home arena: Mid-South Coliseum

The Memphis South Stars were a minor professional ice hockey team in Memphis, Tennessee, that replaced the Memphis Wings in the city. They played in the Central Professional Hockey League for two seasons (1967–68 and 1968–69). They were a farm team of the Minnesota North Stars of the National Hockey League.

== Season-by-season records ==
=== Central Hockey League ===
Season    Games Won Lost Tied Points GoalsFor GoalsAgainst Standing     Playoffs 
1967-68   70    24  34   12   60     206      249          3rd North    Lost Quarter Final 
1968-69   72    14  41   17   45     208      304          4th North    out of playoffs

== Memphis South Stars who played in the NHL ==
- Garry Bauman
- Ken Block
- Bob Charlebois
- Mike Chernoff
- Gary Dineen
- Sandy Fitzpatrick
- Germain Gagnon
- Bill Goldsworthy
- Murray Hall
- Don Johns
- Joey Johnston
- Al LeBrun
- Parker MacDonald
- Barry MacKenzie
- Milan Marcetta
- Ted McCaskill
- Barrie Meissner
- Lou Nanne
- Bill Plager
- Andre Pronovost
- Fern Rivard
- Danny Seguin
- Brian Smith
- George Standing
- Bill Sweeney
- Billy Taylor
- Leo Thiffault
- Carl Wetzel
