= North Bay Trappers (EPHL) =

Canadian professional ice hockey (1961–62)

- City: North Bay, Ontario
- League: Eastern Professional Hockey League
- Operated: 1961–62
- Home arena: North Bay Memorial Gardens
- Colours: blue and white
- Head coach: Bob Sabourin

The North Bay Trappers were a Canadian professional ice hockey team in North Bay, Ontario. They played in the Eastern Professional Hockey League during the 1961–62 season.

== History ==
The Trappers were coached by Bob Sabourin, and placed fifth of six Eastern Professional Hockey League teams during the 1961–62 season, and did not qualify for the playoffs. Joe Szura led the team in scoring with 62 points and 35 assists. The team also had 20-or-more goals each from George Gosselin, Doug Senior, John Sleaver, and Norman Waslawski. Goaltender Claude Dufour played in 60 of the team's 70 games.

The Trappers were sponsored by a combination of five National Hockey League (NHL) teams, who covered only $30,500 of the nearly $44,000 deficit spending on the season. The team was folded following a meeting of NHL executives in July 1962. The Detroit Red Wings and Toronto Maple Leafs declined to support any EPHL team, and the Chicago Black Hawks supported the Syracuse Braves instead of North Bay as a farm team.

Equipment and jerseys of the Trappers were sold to Pete Palangio to operate a junior hockey team of the same name in the Northern Ontario Hockey Association for the 1962–63 season.

== Results ==
| Season | GP | W | L | T | Pts | GF | GA | Standing | Playoffs |
| 1961–62 | 70 | 23 | 37 | 10 | 56 | 186 | 229 | 5th in EPHL | — |

== Notable players ==
List of notable players:

- Pierre Gagne
- Claude Pronovost
- Bob Sabourin
- John Sleaver
- George Standing
- Joe Szura
