= Sault Thunderbirds =

Defunct Canadian ice hockey team

The Sault Thunderbirds were a professional ice hockey team in the Eastern Professional Hockey League from 1959 to 1962. The Thunderbirds were based in Sault Ste. Marie, Ontario, and played at the Sault Memorial Gardens.

== Players ==
=== Hockey Hall of Fame Members ===
There are two members of the Hockey Hall of Fame that played for the Sault Thunderbirds. Gerry Cheevers and Phil Esposito played for the Thunderbirds in the Eastern Professional Hockey League (EPHL) between 1959 and 1962.

=== NHL Alumni ===
- Garry Blaine
- Dusty Blair
- Bill Burega
- Alain Caron
- Gerry Cheevers
- Roger Crozier
- Denis DeJordy
- Roy Edwards
- Phil Esposito
- Terry Gray
- Murray Hall
- Duke Harris
- Rich Healey
- Wayne Hicks
- Eddie Kachur
- Merve Kuryluk
- Milan Marcetta
- Jack Martin
- Matt Ravlich
- Doug Robinson
- Cliff Schmautz
- Bill Speer
- Pat Stapleton
- Bob Wilson
