= Jacksonville Rockets =

Coordinates: 30.3245°N 81.6409°W

- City: Jacksonville, Florida
- League: Eastern Hockey League
- Operated: 1964–1972
- Home arena: Jacksonville Coliseum
- Colors: Orange, white, and blue

The Jacksonville Rockets were a professional minor league ice hockey team based in Jacksonville, Florida. They played in the Eastern Hockey League from 1964–1972, when they folded. They were the first professional hockey team to be based in Florida. They played most of their home games at the Jacksonville Coliseum; from 1966–68 they were known as the Florida Rockets, playing some of their home games in St. Petersburg, Florida.

== History ==
The Rockets joined the Eastern Hockey League (EHL) in 1964, becoming Jacksonville's first professional ice hockey team; they were also the first professional team in Florida since the folding of the Tropical Hockey League in 1939. The league decided to expand into Florida and other Southern states after the unexpected success of the Charlotte Checkers in Charlotte, North Carolina. Organizers chose Jacksonville as the Jacksonville Coliseum was one of the few arenas in Florida equipped for ice hockey. For most of their existence, the Rockets were coached by Bob Sabourin, who initially joined the team as a player and subsequently became the head coach and general manager.

The Rockets faced an uphill battle in attracting fans, as at the time hockey had made few inroads in the southern United States. A contemporary article in the Jacksonville Journal commented that when the Rockets began play, locals "didn't know a hockey puck from a bedwarmer or a hockey stick from a shepherd's staff." Sabourin and the team launched a number of ventures to promote the sport, organizing youth leagues and skating lessons at the Coliseum. Beginning in the 1965–1966 season they played some of their home games at the Bayfront Arena in St. Petersburg, Florida. In 1966 the Rockets hoped to add West Palm Beach as a home city as well, and they changed their name to the Florida Rockets to reflect their new "all-Florida" status. However, the West Palm Beach games were cancelled due to construction delays, and the team resumed their original name in 1968.

The Rockets fielded mostly losing teams and drew modest crowds for most of their run. They drew sellout and near-sellout crowds in Jacksonville in 1967, when they were in contention for the EHL championship. Otherwise, they averaged around 2,500 spectators per game. The Rockets finally folded in 1972 due to economic pressures. They were followed by the American Hockey League's Jacksonville Barons, who relocated from Cleveland, Ohio in 1973. The Barons folded at the end of the 1973–1974 season, and Jacksonville did not have a hockey team for nearly two decades. Bob Sabourin remained in Jacksonville, promoting concerts, professional wrestling and other events. He eventually opened his own skating rink and owned another minor league hockey team, the Jacksonville Bullets.
