= Nashville Dixie Flyers =

The Nashville Dixie Flyers were a professional minor league ice hockey team in Nashville, Tennessee. They played in the Eastern Hockey League from 1962 until the franchise folded in 1971. Their home games were held at the Nashville Municipal Auditorium.

== Record ==
Season	League	GP	W	L	T	Playoffs
1962–63	EHL	68	16	48	4	Lost first round
1963–64	EHL	72	37	31	4	Lost first round
1964–65	EHL	76	54	18	0	Lost finals
1965–66	EHL	72	42	23	7	Champions
1966–67	EHL	72	51	19	2	Champions
1967–68	EHL	72	42	23	7	Lost first round
1968–69	EHL	72	41	25	6	Lost finals
1969–70	EHL	74	27	38	9	Did not qualify
1970–71	EHL	74	26	43	5	Lost first round
