= Trois-Rivières Lions (1955–1960) =

Trois-Rivieres
- City: Trois-Rivières, Quebec
- League: Quebec Hockey League; Eastern Professional Hockey League
- Founded: 1955
- Folded: 1960

Franchise history
- 1955–1960: Trois-Rivieres Lions

The Trois-Rivières Lions were an ice hockey team in Trois-Rivières, Quebec. They played in the Quebec Hockey League from 1955 to 1959, and the Eastern Professional Hockey League for the 1959-1960 season.

== Results ==
Season	GP	W	L	T	OTL	SOL	Pts	GF	GA	Place	Playoffs
1959–60	70	30	31	9	–	–	69	226	235	4th, EPHL	—
