= 1959–60 EPHL season =

The 1959–60 Eastern Professional Hockey League season was the first season of the Eastern Professional Hockey League, a North American minor professional league. Six teams participated in the regular season, and the Montreal Royals were the league champions.

== Regular season ==
Eastern Professional Hockey League	GP	W	L	OTL	GF	GA	Pts
Sudbury Wolves	70	36	26	8	310	283	80
Montreal Royals	70	30	26	14	215	198	74
Hull-Ottawa Canadiens	70	31	28	11	249	241	73
Lions de Trois-Rivières	70	30	31	9	226	235	69
Sault Ste. Marie Thunderbirds	70	27	32	11	248	262	65
Kingston Frontenacs	70	28	39	3	297	326	59

== Playoffs ==
Semifinals
1	Sudbury Wolves	4
3	Hull-Ottawa Canadians	3
2	Montreal Royals	4
4	Trois Rivieres Lions	3

Final
1	Sudbury Wolves	3
2	Montreal Royals	4
