= Sudbury Wolves (EPHL) =

Defunct Canadian minor league hockey team

The Sudbury Wolves of the Eastern Professional Hockey League (EPHL) were a minor league professional ice hockey team affiliated with the National Hockey League. The team was based in Sudbury, Ontario, and played home games at the Sudbury Arena.

Prior to becoming professional, the Wolves played as an amateur senior ice hockey team in the Northern Ontario Hockey Association (NOHA) from 1951 to 1957, and the Ontario Hockey Association (OHA) Senior division from 1957 to 1959. The senior amateur club was the Eastern Canada representative at the 1954 Allan Cup, losing that year's national senior championship to the Western Canada representative, the Penticton Vees.
