= 1968–69 CHL season =

American ice hockey season

The 1968–69 CHL season was the sixth season of the Central Hockey League, a North American minor professional league. Nine teams participated in the regular season, and the Dallas Black Hawks won the league title.

== Regular season ==
Northern Division	GP	W	L	OTL	GF	GA	Pts
Tulsa Oilers	72	28	28	16	250	240	72
Kansas City Blues	72	26	28	18	236	242	70
Omaha Knights	72	29	32	11	247	250	69
Memphis South Stars	72	14	41	17	208	304	45

Southern Division	GP	W	L	OTL	GF	GA	Pts
Oklahoma City Blazers	72	40	19	13	295	225	93
Dallas Black Hawks	72	37	25	10	264	218	84
Houston Apollos	72	34	26	12	224	204	80
Amarillo Wranglers	72	29	32	11	238	252	69
Fort Worth Wings	72	23	29	20	210	237	66

== Playoffs ==
Semifinals
S1	Oklahoma City Blazers
Bye
N1	Tulsa Oilers
Bye
S2	Dallas Black Hawks	3
S3	Houston Apollos	0
N2	Kansas City Blues	1
N3	Omaha Knights	3

Final
S1	Oklahoma City Blazers	4
N1	Tulsa Oilers	3
S2	Dallas Black Hawks	3
N3	Omaha Knights	0

Adams Cup Final
S1	Oklahoma City Blazers	1
S2	Dallas Black Hawks	4
