= Kitchener Beavers =

- City: Kitchener, Ontario
- League: Eastern Professional Hockey League
- Founded: 1960
- Folded: 1962

Franchise history
- 1960-1962: Kitchener Beavers

The Kitchener Beavers were a Canadian professional ice hockey team in Kitchener, Ontario. They played in the Eastern Professional Hockey League from 1960-1962.

== Results ==
Season	GP	W	L	T	OTL	SOL	Pts	GF	GA	Place	Playoffs
1960-61	70	31	28	11	—	—	73	220	215	2., EPHL	—
1961-62	70	36	24	10	—	—	82	263	217	3., EPHL	—
