= 1960–61 EPHL season =

The 1960–61 Eastern Professional Hockey League season was the second season of the Eastern Professional Hockey League, a North American minor professional league. Six teams participated in the regular season, and the Hull-Ottawa Canadians were the league champions.

== Regular season ==
Eastern Professional Hockey League	GP	W	L	OTL	GF	GA	Pts
Hull-Ottawa Canadiens	70	41	20	9	268	187	91
Kitchener-Waterloo Beavers	70	31	28	11	220	215	73
Sault Thunderbirds	70	32	29	9	236	234	73
Kingston Frontenacs	70	29	33	8	259	269	66
Sudbury Wolves	70	28	33	9	236	257	65
Montreal Royals	70	19	37	14	167	224	52

== Playoffs ==
Semifinals
1	Hull-Ottawa Canadians	4
3	Kitchener-Waterloo Beavers	3
2	Sault Thunderbirds	4
4	Kingston Frontenancs	1

Final
1	Hull-Ottawa Canadiens	4
2	Sault Thunderbirds	3
