= 1961–62 EPHL season =

The 1961–62 Eastern Professional Hockey League season was the third season of the Eastern Professional Hockey League, a North American minor professional league. Six teams participated in the regular season, and the Hull-Ottawa Canadians were the league champions.

== Regular season ==
Eastern Professional Hockey League	GP	W	L	OTL	GF	GA	Pts
Hull-Ottawa Canadiens	70	38	21	11	233	172	87
Kingston Frontenacs	70	38	24	8	274	224	84
Kitchener-Waterloo Beavers	70	36	24	10	263	217	82
Sudbury Wolves	70	27	31	12	235	271	66
North Bay Trappers	70	23	37	10	186	229	56
Sault Ste. Marie Thunderbirds	70	17	42	11	207	285	45

== Playoffs ==
Semifinals
1	Hull-Ottawa Canadians	4
3	Kitchener-Waterloo Beavers	3
2	Kingston Frontenacs	4
4	Sudbury Wolves	1

Final
1	Hull-Ottawa Canadiens	4
2	Kingston Frontenacs	2
