= Eastern Professional Hockey League (1959–1963) =

Hockey league

The Eastern Professional Hockey League (EPHL) was a minor professional ice hockey league that operated primarily in Ontario and Quebec from 1959 to 1963.

While the NHL had established working relationships with teams in leagues such as the AHL and WHL, these leagues and their teams were not fully under the control of the NHL, and in this era they operated more independently than is the case today. The Eastern Professional Hockey League was created in 1959 as the first farm league fully run and controlled by the NHL. While the league proved to be a success on the ice, it largely failed off the ice. Attendance in these smaller cities could not support professional hockey, and by 1962, the league was reduced to just four teams. While the intent was for the EPHL to be the primary development league for the NHL, the Detroit Red Wings did not participate until the final season, and the Toronto Maple Leafs never had an affiliate.

During its final season, the league played an interlocking schedule with the International Hockey League. Following the demise of the EPHL, the NHL created the new Central Hockey League of minor-pro farm teams in larger, midwestern U.S. cities. Four of the CHL's initial five franchises were relocations of the previous season's EPHL teams.

== Member teams ==
EPHL Teams
- Hull-Ottawa Canadiens (1959–1963)
- Kingston Frontenacs (1959–1963)
- Kitchener Beavers (1960–1962)
- Montreal Royals (1959–1961)
- North Bay Trappers (1961–1962)
- St. Louis Braves (1962–1963)
- Sault Thunderbirds (1959–1962) (moved to Syracuse for 1962–63 season)
- Sudbury Wolves (1959–1963)
- Syracuse Braves (1962–1963) (moved to St. Louis during the 1962–63 season)
- Trois-Rivières Lions (1959–1960) (moved to Kitchener for 1960–61 season)

== League champions ==
- 1960 - Montreal Royals
- 1961 - Hull-Ottawa Canadiens
- 1962 - Hull-Ottawa Canadiens
- 1963 - Kingston Frontenacs
