= Eric Nesterenko =

Canadian ice hockey player (1933–2022)

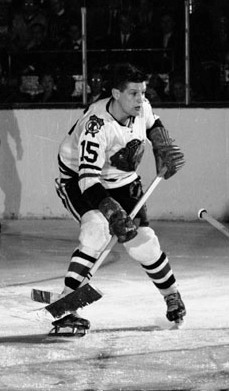
- Nesterenko with the Chicago Black Hawks
- Born: October 31, 1933 Flin Flon, Manitoba, Canada
- Died: June 4, 2022 (aged 88) Grand Junction, Colorado, U.S.
- Height: 6 ft 1 in (185 cm)
- Weight: 186 lb (84 kg; 13 st 4 lb)
- Position: Centre
- Shot: Right
- Played for: Toronto Maple Leafs; Chicago Black Hawks; Chicago Cougars
- Playing career: 1951–1974

Eric Paul Nesterenko (October 31, 1933 – June 4, 2022) was a Canadian professional ice hockey centre who played in the National Hockey League (NHL) for the Toronto Maple Leafs from 1951 until 1956 and for the Chicago Black Hawks from 1956 until 1972.

== Early life ==
Nesterenko was born in Flin Flon, Manitoba, to immigrants from Ukraine. He moved at 16 and attended high school at North Toronto Collegiate Institute. Nesterenko played as a member of the Toronto Marlboros.

== Playing career ==
Nesterenko played five years with the Toronto Maple Leafs before being traded to the Blackhawks for cash. He played 16 years with the Blackhawks from 1956 to 1972 for a total of 1,013 games, which ranks seventh in team history. Nesterenko was known as a superb penalty killer and was given the nickname “Elbows". In both 1965 and 1967, he led the league in shorthanded goals.

Nesterenko was an NHL All-Star in 1961 and 1965, and was a key part of 1961 Stanley Cup championship. He also made 12 other playoff appearances with the Blackhawks.

Nesterenko was better known for speed on the ice than for goal-scoring. Chicago Tribune columnist Bob Markus commented, "I've always thought that Nesterenko would have been the greatest player of all time if they played the game without a puck." Nesterenko had 495 points (207 goals along with 288 assists) and 1,014 penalty minutes while playing for the Blackhawks. He had a total of 250 goals and 324 assists during his NHL career.

Following his NHL career, Nesterenko played for the Chicago Cougars of the World Hockey Association in 1973-74 after a year of coaching in Switzerland.

=== Controversy ===
During one game in 1961, Nesterenko infamously attacked Willie O'Ree, the first Black player in the NHL, with racial slurs and butt-ended O'Ree with his hockey stick, breaking O'Ree's nose and knocking out his front teeth. O'Ree retaliated with his stick and Nesterenko required 15 stitches in his head. During the next game that Nesterenko and O'Ree played, Nesterenko slashed O'Ree's ankles. Nesterenko never apologized to O'Ree, despite having an opportunity 30 years later when they met at an all-star game. O'Ree later named Nesterenko and described the incidents in his autobiography.

== Personal life ==
In 1986, Nesterenko played the father of character Dean Youngblood (Rob Lowe) in the movie Youngblood, and was also the film's hockey consultant. He has worked as a disk jockey, a stockbroker, a travel broker, a freelance writer, a university professor, and a ski instructor.

Near the end of Nesterenko's NHL career, he was interviewed for Studs Terkel's bestselling book, Working: What People do all Day and How They Feel About What They Do.

Nesterenko spent his later life in Colorado, and died on June 4, 2022 at the age of 88.

== Awards and achievements ==
- WHL championship (1956)
- Edinburgh Trophy championship (1956)
- Stanley Cup championship (1961)
- Played in NHL All-Star Game (1961 and 1965)
- Honoured Member of the Manitoba Hockey Hall of Fame

== Career statistics ==
=== Regular season and playoffs ===
			Regular season					Playoffs
Season	Team	League	GP	G	A	Pts	PIM	GP	G	A	Pts	PIM
1949–50	Toronto Marlboros	OHA	1	0	0	0	0	—	—	—	—	—
1950–51	Toronto Marlboros	OHA	46	28	22	50	90	13	7	9	16	27
1951–52	Toronto Marlboros	OHA	52	53	42	95	133	6	2	6	8	12
1951–52	Toronto Maple Leafs	NHL	1	0	0	0	0	—	—	—	—	—
1952–53	Toronto Marlboros	OHA	34	27	21	48	46	—	—	—	—	—
1952–53	Toronto Maple Leafs	NHL	35	10	6	16	27	—	—	—	—	—
1953–54	Toronto Maple Leafs	NHL	68	14	9	23	70	5	0	1	1	9
1954–55	Toronto Maple Leafs	NHL	62	15	15	30	99	4	0	1	1	6
1955–56	Toronto Maple Leafs	NHL	40	4	6	10	65	—	—	—	—	—
1955–56	Winnipeg Warriors	WHL	20	8	6	14	27	14	3	7	10	22
1956–57	Chicago Black Hawks	NHL	24	8	15	23	32	—	—	—	—	—
1957–58	Chicago Black Hawks	NHL	70	20	18	38	104	—	—	—	—	—
1958–59	Chicago Black Hawks	NHL	70	16	18	34	81	6	2	2	4	8
1959–60	Chicago Black Hawks	NHL	61	13	23	36	71	4	0	0	0	2
1960–61	Chicago Black Hawks	NHL	68	19	19	38	125	11	2	3	5	6
1961–62	Chicago Black Hawks	NHL	68	15	14	29	97	12	0	5	5	22
1962–63	Chicago Black Hawks	NHL	67	12	15	27	103	6	2	3	5	8
1963–64	Chicago Black Hawks	NHL	70	7	19	26	93	7	2	1	3	8
1964–65	Chicago Black Hawks	NHL	56	14	16	30	63	14	2	2	4	16
1965–66	Chicago Black Hawks	NHL	67	15	25	40	58	6	1	0	1	4
1966–67	Chicago Black Hawks	NHL	68	14	23	37	38	6	1	2	3	2
1967–68	Chicago Black Hawks	NHL	71	11	25	36	37	10	0	1	1	2
1968–69	Chicago Black Hawks	NHL	72	15	17	32	29	—	—	—	—	—
1969–70	Chicago Black Hawks	NHL	67	16	18	34	26	7	1	2	3	4
1970–71	Chicago Black Hawks	NHL	76	8	15	23	28	18	0	1	1	19
1971–72	Chicago Black Hawks	NHL	38	4	8	12	27	8	0	0	0	11
1973–74	Chicago Cougars	WHA	29	2	5	7	8	—	—	—	—	—
1975–76	Trail Smoke Eaters	WIHL	40	10	25	35	38	—	—	—	—	—
WHA totals			29	2	5	7	8	—	—	—	—	—
NHL totals			1,219	250	324	574	1,273	124	13	24	37	127

== See also ==
- List of NHL players with 1,000 games played
