= Bill Mosienko =

Canadian ice hockey player (1921–1994)

- Hockey Hall of Fame, 1965
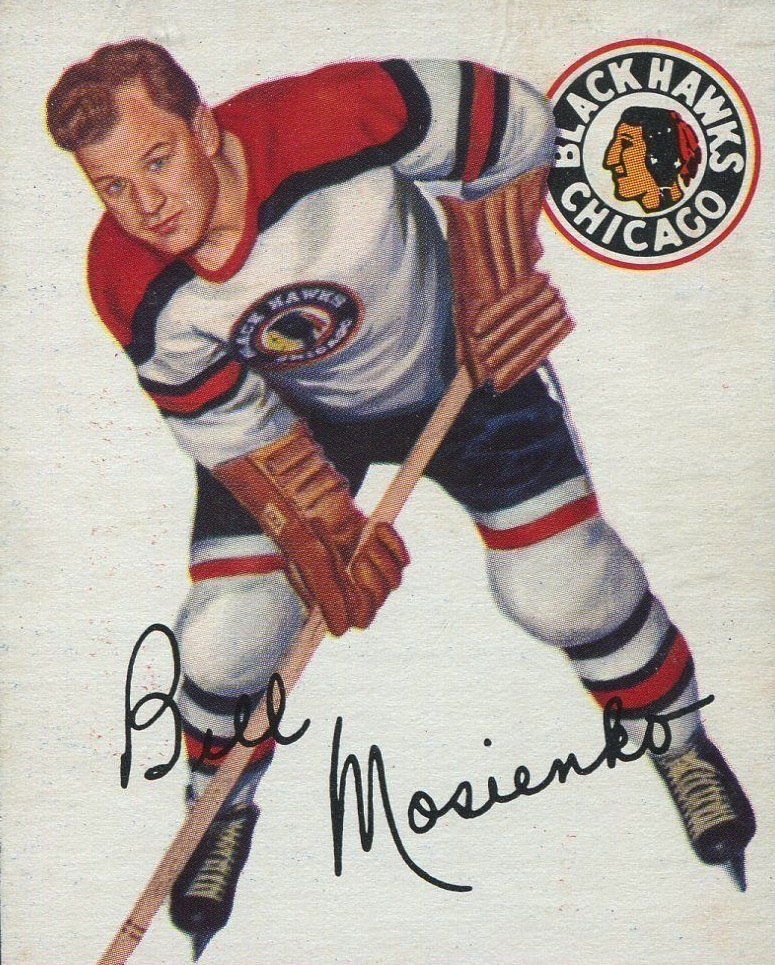
- Born: November 2, 1921 Winnipeg, Manitoba, Canada
- Died: July 9, 1994 (aged 72) Winnipeg, Manitoba, Canada
- Height: 5 ft 8 in (173 cm)
- Weight: 160 lb (73 kg; 11 st 6 lb)
- Position: Right wing
- Shot: Right
- Played for: Chicago Black Hawks
- Playing career: 1940–1959

William Mosienko (November 2, 1921 – July 9, 1994) was a Canadian professional ice hockey player who was a right winger for 14 seasons in the National Hockey League (NHL) for the Chicago Black Hawks from 1942 to 1955. He is best noted for recording the fastest hat trick in NHL history. In a 1952 game against the New York Rangers, Mosienko scored three goals in 21 seconds.

In the NHL, Mosienko won the Lady Byng Memorial Trophy in 1945 as the most gentlemanly player in the league, played in five All-Star Games and was twice named to the second All-Star team. He left the league in 1955 to help bring professional hockey to his hometown of Winnipeg. He helped create the Winnipeg Warriors of the Western Hockey League and was a three-time All-Star in his four years of play in the league. He won the league championship in 1956.

Mosienko was inducted into the Hockey Hall of Fame in 1965 and into the Manitoba Sports Hall of Fame and Museum in 1980.

== Early life ==
Mosienko was born on November 2, 1921, in Winnipeg, Manitoba. He was one of 13 children, having eight brothers and four sisters. His parents, Daniel and Natalia, were Ukrainian immigrants who came from Ekaterinoslav (modern Dnipro, Ukraine). In Canada Daniel worked as a boilermaker with the Canadian Pacific Railway. Mosienko grew up in Winnipeg's north end.

He developed a passion for hockey and began playing at the age of 10 with the Tobans and later Sherburn athletic clubs. At 17, he sought to try out with the St. James Canadians junior team in 1939 and after being told he was too young, instead joined the Winnipeg Monarchs. He played the 1939–40 MJHL season with them and scored 21 goals in 24 games. Though still eligible for junior hockey, Mosienko left the team as they did not cover the cost of transportation for him within Winnipeg, later noting that as he was from a poor family he needed that money to help him out.

== Playing career ==
=== Chicago Black Hawks ===
Chicago Black Hawks player Joe Cooper discovered Mosienko playing on outdoor rinks in Winnipeg and recommended that Hawks management sign him. He had also been signed by the New York Rangers, but as Chicago submitted their claim first, they retained Mosienko's rights. Mosienko signed with Chicago at the age of 18 and was assigned to their minor league team, the Providence Reds of the American Hockey League. He played 36 games with Providence during the 1940–41 season, scoring 33 points, before being reassigned to the Kansas City Americans of the American Hockey Association, whom Chicago had just purchased as an additional minor-league affiliate. He finished the AHA season with 4 points in 7 games. The Black Hawks first recalled Mosienko in 1942, replacing players who had left to fight World War II. He scored his first two NHL goals on February 9, 1942, 21 seconds apart. An ankle injury kept him out for several weeks, and he finished the season with 14 points in 12 NHL games.

Mosineko returned to Winnipeg for the summer of 1942 and worked in a defence plant. He tried to enlist in the military but was refused for medical reasons, likely related to his small size. He was also unable to cross into the United States as a result of travel restrictions and played the 1942–43 season primarily with the Quebec Aces of the Quebec Senior Hockey League, appearing in 8 games for them and scoring 5 points. He appeared in two games when the Hawks traveled to Toronto. He finally established himself as an NHL regular in 1943–44 and scored a career high 70 points. Mosienko and his linemates Clint Smith and Doug Bentley combined to score 219 points, at that time an NHL record. His 70 points set a team rookie record that stood for 37 years until broken by Denis Savard in 1980–81.

In 1944–45, Mosienko finished sixth in league scoring with 54 points and did not record a single penalty minute throughout the course of the season. He was awarded the Lady Byng Memorial Trophy as the NHL's most gentlemanly player and named a second-team All-Star. He was also voted the most popular player on the team by its fans.

The following season, Chicago coach Johnny Gottselig paired Mosienko with the Bentley brothers: Max and Doug. The trio formed what came to be known as the "Pony Line" due to their speed and small size and emerged as one of the top scoring trios in the NHL. Max Bentley led the league in scoring in 1945–46, and despite missing time with a knee injury, Mosienko finished sixth. He was again named a second-team All-Star. He played in the first National Hockey League All-Star Game prior to the start of the 1947–48 season, during which he suffered a broken leg and was initially feared lost for the year. He ultimately missed the first two months of play, while the Pony Line was broken up for good shortly after his injury when Max Bentley was traded to the Toronto Maple Leafs.

Mosienko remained a key contributor to the Black Hawks offence, appearing in five All-Star Games during his career. His most famous moment came on March 23, 1952, in a game against the New York Rangers on the final night of the regular season. He scored three goals in a 21-second span of the third period against New York's Lorne Anderson to set a new record for the fastest hat-trick by one player. Linemate Gus Bodnar assisted on all three goals, and he nearly had a fourth goal 45 seconds later on a shot that deflected off the goalpost. Mosienko's feat remains an NHL record.

Due to his small size, Mosienko was a frequent target of physical abuse from larger opponents, and suffered numerous injuries as a result. Despite this, he refrained from retaliation and was well regarded across the league for his gentlemanly conduct. In 14 NHL seasons, he totaled only 121 penalty minutes and had just one fight.

After the 1953–54 season Mosienko decided to retire from hockey, but the Black Hawks asked him to return for one more season, which he agreed to do. He played 64 games and had 27 points in the 1954–55 season, his last in the NHL. Feeling the Black Hawks lowballed him in regards to salary, Mosienko retired a second and final time from the NHL in 1955.

=== Winnipeg Warriors ===
Retired from the NHL, Mosienko returned to Winnipeg, where he was offered a contract with the newly founded Winnipeg Warriors of the Western Hockey League. He led the Warriors to the President's Cup championship in the team's first year of 1955–56 and helped the Warriors defeat the Quebec Hockey League's Montreal Royals for the Edinburgh Trophy, Canada's minor professional championship. He scored two goals in the deciding sixth game of a 3–1 victory to capture the trophy. He was named to the WHL All-Star team three times: 1957, 1958 and 1959. Though he scored 88 points in the 1958–59 season, Mosienko announced his retirement after 18 seasons of professional hockey. He coached the team for one season in 1959–60, but quit after one year as he found it took up too much time.

At the time of his retirement from the NHL, Mosienko was seventh all-time in league scoring with 540 points. He was inducted into the Hockey Hall of Fame in 1965, and to the Manitoba Sports Hall of Fame and Museum in 1980. Additionally, Mosienko is honoured by the Manitoba Hockey Hall of Fame and in 2000 was named to its provincial All-Century first All-Star team.

== Off the ice ==
In 1947 Mosienko and Joe Cooper built a bowling alley in Winnipeg, which opened in 1948. Cooper ran the business during Mosienko's playing career, though Mosienko would actively take a role during summers when he was in Winnipeg. On retiring from hockey Mosienko became more involved, though his relationship with Cooper worsened, and Mosienko ultimately bought out Cooper's interest in the bowling alleys. Mosienko and his family owned and operated them until 2007. He was a supporter of Winnipeg minor hockey and Manitoba oldtimers associations. There is an arena named in Mosienko's honor in his hometown of Winnipeg.

Mosienko had known his wife, Wanda Swita, since they were both children; they were married on July 13, 1946. They had three children: two sons and one daughter. His grandson, Tyler, was also a professional hockey player. The younger Mosienko remembers his grandfather as a humble man who would join him on the family's backyard rink when he was learning to skate as a child. Diagnosed with stomach cancer in 1986, Mosienko initially recovered, but in 1991 a follow-up exam found the cancer had spread to his brain; he died on July 9, 1994. He was buried in Brookside Cemetery in Winnipeg. In October 2021, a book about Mosienko's life titled Mosienko: The Man Who Caught Lightning In A Bottle by Ty Dilello was published.

== Career statistics ==
=== Regular season and playoffs ===
			Regular season					Playoffs
Season	Team	League	GP	G	A	Pts	PIM	GP	G	A	Pts	PIM
1939–40	Winnipeg Monarchs	MJHL	24	21	8	29	14	7	8	3	11	2
1940–41	Providence Reds	AHL	36	14	19	33	8	—	—	—	—	—
1940–41	Kansas City Americans	AHA	7	2	2	4	0	8	4	1	5	2
1941–42	Kansas City Americans	AHA	33	12	19	31	9	—	—	—	—	—
1941–42	Chicago Black Hawks	NHL	11	6	8	14	4	3	2	0	2	0
1942–43	Chicago Black Hawks	NHL	2	2	0	2	0	—	—	—	—	—
1942–43	Quebec Aces	QSHL	8	5	3	8	2	4	2	2	4	2
1943–44	Chicago Black Hawks	NHL	50	32	38	70	10	8	2	2	4	6
1944–45	Chicago Black Hawks	NHL	50	28	26	54	0	—	—	—	—	—
1945–46	Chicago Black Hawks	NHL	40	18	30	48	12	4	2	0	2	2
1946–47	Chicago Black Hawks	NHL	59	25	27	52	2	—	—	—	—	—
1947–48	Chicago Black Hawks	NHL	40	16	9	25	9	—	—	—	—	—
1948–49	Chicago Black Hawks	NHL	60	17	25	42	6	—	—	—	—	—
1949–50	Chicago Black Hawks	NHL	69	18	28	46	10	—	—	—	—	—
1950–51	Chicago Black Hawks	NHL	65	21	15	36	18	—	—	—	—	—
1951–52	Chicago Black Hawks	NHL	70	31	22	53	10	—	—	—	—	—
1952–53	Chicago Black Hawks	NHL	65	17	20	37	8	7	4	2	6	7
1953–54	Chicago Black Hawks	NHL	65	15	19	34	17	—	—	—	—	—
1954–55	Chicago Black Hawks	NHL	64	12	15	27	24	—	—	—	—	—
1955–56	Winnipeg Warriors	WHL	64	22	23	45	37	14	6	12	18	4
1955–56	Winnipeg Warriors	Ed-Cup	—	—	—	—	—	6	6	3	9	6
1956–57	Winnipeg Warriors	WHL	61	27	26	53	25	—	—	—	—	—
1957–58	Winnipeg Warriors	WHL	65	38	36	74	43	7	1	0	1	6
1958–59	Winnipeg Warriors	WHL	63	42	46	88	55	7	1	3	4	10
NHL totals			710	258	282	540	121	22	10	4	14	15

== Awards and honours ==
Award	Year
National Hockey League
Lady Byng Memorial Trophy	1944–45
second-team All-Star	1944–45; 1945–46
Western Hockey League
WHL All-Star team	1956–57; 1957–58; 1958–59
Other
Manitoba Athlete of the Year	1957

== Bibliography ==
- Dilello, Ty (2021), Mosienko: The Man Who Caught Lightning in a Bottle, Winnipeg, Manitoba: Great Plains Publishers, ISBN 978-1-77337-062-0

Preceded by Clint Smith	Winner of the Lady Byng Trophy; 1945	Succeeded by Toe Blake
