= John Cullen =

Canadian ice hockey player (born 1964)

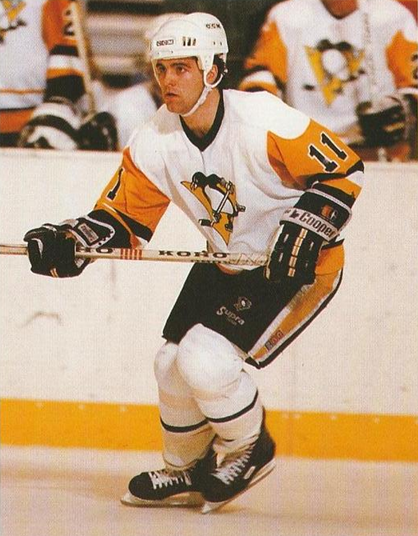
- Born: August 2, 1964 (age 62) Puslinch, Ontario, Canada
- Height: 5 ft 10 in (178 cm)
- Weight: 187 lb (85 kg; 13 st 5 lb)
- Position: Centre
- Shot: Right
- Played for: Pittsburgh Penguins; Hartford Whalers; Toronto Maple Leafs; Tampa Bay Lightning
- National team: Canada
- NHL draft: 1986 NHL supplemental draft Buffalo Sabres
- Playing career: 1987–1998

Barry John Cullen (born August 2, 1964) is a Canadian former professional ice hockey player who was a centre for ten seasons in the National Hockey League (NHL). He played college ice hockey for the Boston University Terriers, where he was a standout player, and is the school's all-time leading scorer. After the Buffalo Sabres selected him in the 1986 NHL supplemental draft but chose not to offer him a contract, Cullen signed with the Flint Spirits of the International Hockey League (IHL) for the 1987–88 season, where he was named the IHL's co-Rookie of the Year and Most Valuable Player after leading the league in scoring.

His career was halted in 1997 when he was diagnosed with non-Hodgkin lymphoma. He attempted a brief comeback in 1998 after an 18-month battle with the disease, for which the NHL awarded him the Bill Masterton Memorial Trophy, before retiring to serve as an assistant coach for a year with the Tampa Bay Lightning. Cullen played in two NHL All-Star Games in his career. He joined his brother in the car dealership business after leaving the game, and briefly operated his own dealership until forced to close during the automotive industry crisis of 2008–10.

== Early life ==
Cullen was born in Puslinch, Ontario, on August 2, 1964. He is one of six children of Barry and Loretta Cullen. His father and uncles Brian and Ray all played in the NHL, and while Cullen and his three brothers all played as well, their father never pressured them, preferring that they enjoy the game.

He idolized his elder brother Terry, who was considered a top NHL prospect until Terry's career was ended when he suffered a broken neck after being hit from behind into the boards during a college game. While his brother was highly sought by American universities, John received only two scholarship offers, choosing to play for Boston University (BU) in 1983. His other offer came from Ferris State University.

At the same time, his mother Loretta was diagnosed with skin cancer. Following her death early in his freshman year, Cullen contemplated returning to his Ontario home, but was convinced by his father to continue with both school and hockey. He used the game to cope with the loss and dedicated every game he played to his mother's memory. Cullen felt that the inspiration he drew from his mother's battle allowed him to become a better player.

== Playing career ==
Cullen was a standout with BU; he was named the East Coast Athletic Conference Rookie of the Year in 1983–84 after leading his team in scoring with 56 points. The National Hockey League passed him over, however, as he went unclaimed in the 1984 NHL entry draft. He was named to the Hockey East All-Star Teams in 1985, 1986 and 1987, and a National Collegiate Athletic Association East Second Team All-American in 1986. He graduated as BU's all-time scoring leader with 241 points, and was named to BU's Hockey East 25th anniversary team in 2009.

Passed over in the entry draft, Cullen was finally selected by the Buffalo Sabres in the 1986 NHL supplemental draft. When the Sabres failed to offer him a contract, Cullen signed with the Flint Spirits of the International Hockey League (IHL) for the 1987–88 season. He led the league with 157 points, scoring 48 goals, and won the James Gatschene Memorial Trophy as league most valuable player while sharing the Gary F. Longman Memorial Trophy with Ed Belfour as rookie of the year. Cullen's outstanding season in Flint caught the attention of the Sabres and the Pittsburgh Penguins. He signed a contract with the Penguins for the league minimum, passing up a superior contract offer from Buffalo as he remained upset at how they released him the year before.

=== National Hockey League ===
Cullen made his NHL debut in 1988–89, appearing in 79 games with the Penguins and scoring 49 points. He was given a greater role with the Penguins the following year after Mario Lemieux missed 21 games due to a back injury and responded by scoring 32 goals and 92 points to finish third in team scoring. Additionally, he played for Team Canada at the 1990 World Championship, scoring four points in ten games. Cullen had his best season in 1990–91. As one of the team's top offensive centres, he scored 94 points in the Penguins' first 65 games and played in his first NHL All-Star Game. However, when Lemieux returned after missing an additional 50-games due to injury, Cullen's playing time and production declined.

The Penguins' needs led them to complete a blockbuster trade on March 1, 1991. Cullen was sent to the Hartford Whalers, along with Zarley Zalapski and Jeff Parker in exchange for Hartford's all-time leading scorer, Ron Francis, along with Ulf Samuelsson and Grant Jennings. The Penguins almost turned down the deal as they were concerned about giving up Cullen's playmaking and leadership abilities, while his former teammates credited Cullen as being the primary reason they were in a playoff position at the time the trade happened. After the Penguins won their first Stanley Cup that season, Phil Bourque later said it "broke his heart" that Cullen was not able to share in that championship.

In Hartford, Cullen worked to overcome the team's fans' disappointment at losing Francis. The Hartford fans initially booed him to show their dissatisfaction with the trade. He scored 16 points in 13 regular season games to finish the season with 110 points combined between the Penguins and Whalers, and was the team's best player in their first round loss to the Boston Bruins in the 1991 Stanley Cup Playoffs. He initially accepted an invitation to join the Canadian team at the 1991 Canada Cup, but subsequently chose not to participate as his contract had expired, leading to greater insurance concerns. Still without a contract when the 1991–92 season began, Cullen missed the first four games before signing a four-year deal with Hartford worth a total of $4 million. He returned to score 77 points in 77 games in his first full season with the Whalers and represented the team at the 1992 All-Star Game.

Midway through the 1992–93 NHL season, the Whalers sent Cullen to the Toronto Maple Leafs for Toronto's second round selection at the 1993 NHL entry draft. Cullen was excited to play for his father's old team, but injuries reduced his ability to perform. His most significant injury was a herniated disc in his neck that doctors initially feared would end his career. A bulky neck brace allowed Cullen to return and play out his contract in Toronto. When the Leafs chose not to re-sign him following the 1993–94 season, he returned to the Penguins for one season before Tony Esposito convinced him to sign with the Tampa Bay Lightning in 1995.

Cullen enjoyed immediate success with linemates Shawn Burr and Alexander Selivanov as the trio combined to score 130 points and helped lead the Lightning to the first playoff appearance in franchise history. They were eliminated by the Philadelphia Flyers in five games while Cullen led the team in playoff scoring with three goals and three assists. The Lightning looked to improve in 1996–97; Cullen was leading the team in scoring, but was suffering flu-like symptoms that he could not shake. As Tampa was fighting for a playoff spot, he played through his condition for weeks.

=== Cancer and comeback ===
After two months of quietly dealing with his symptoms, Cullen's wife finally called team trainers and asked them to check into his illness. The team took an x-ray and found a large black shadow in his chest. He underwent a CAT scan which revealed Cullen had a baseball-sized tumor; he was diagnosed as having Non-Hodgkin lymphoma. The diagnosis ended his season, and he immediately began chemotherapy treatments that quickly reduced his cancer. The tumor was gone by September 1997, but a precautionary test prior to training camp revealed that Cullen still had cancer cells in his body. He missed the entire 1997–98 NHL season as he continued to battle the disease, while his teammates wore a uniform patch with his #12 in support throughout the year.

On one day during his treatments, as his wife was wheeling him down a hospital corridor, Cullen went into cardiac arrest, requiring doctors to use a defibrillator to revive him. He underwent a bone marrow transplant that briefly reduced his immune system to the point that he could have very little human contact. Another examination in April 1998 revealed that the cancer was finally gone, and Cullen immediately began training for a comeback.

The Lightning signed Cullen to a one-year, $500,000 contract for the 1998–99 season. He played his first game in nearly 18 months on September 18, 1998, in an exhibition game between the Lightning and Sabres at Innsbruck, Austria. Cullen scored the game-winning goal in a 3–1 victory, after which he said he sat on the bench in disbelief over how he was given a second chance. He was named to the roster and was greeted with a loud standing ovation by the fans in Tampa Bay when he was introduced prior to their season opening game.

Cullen appeared in four of the Lightning's first eight games, but it was evident that he had lost much of his speed and strength. The Lightning assigned him to the IHL's Cleveland Lumberjacks, but also gave him the option of retiring and taking up a position as an assistant coach. He chose to accept the demotion, giving himself one month to determine if he could continue playing. He appeared in six games for Cleveland, and in one game against the Chicago Wolves tied an IHL record when he scored seven points in a 7–3 victory.

However, a bout of bronchitis led Cullen to fear that his cancer had returned. Tests came back negative, but after spending time with his family, he realized that neither he nor his family were interested in returning to Cleveland. Cullen announced his retirement on November 28, 1998, and accepted the Lightning offer to become an assistant coach. In recognition of his comeback attempt, the NHL named him the 1999 winner of the Bill Masterton Memorial Trophy for dedication and perseverance, while the IHL renamed its Comeback Player of the Year award the John Cullen Award.

Former Lightning head coach Terry Crisp has stated publicly that Cullen was a player that stood out as something special saying "John Cullen ... beat cancer and came back to play and helped us win."

== Off the ice ==
Cullen and his wife Valerie have three daughters, Kennedy and twins Karlyn and Kortland. Unwilling to spend so much time away from his family, he left the Lightning in 1999 and settled in the Atlanta area, joining his brother's car dealership in Jonesboro, Georgia. He had always expected to become a car dealer after his hockey career, as his father, uncles and brother all worked in the industry. After apprenticing under his brother for five years, he bought a Dodge dealership in Newnan, Georgia in 2007. However, he owned the dealership for less than two years before Chrysler closed him down as part of its recovery plan in response to the Automotive industry crisis of 2008–2010. He has since returned to his brother's dealership, serving as its general manager.

Cullen's battle with cancer inspired Timm Harmon of the Moffitt Cancer Centre to partner with the Lightning to raise awareness and money for cancer research. The NHL itself joined the cause in the winter of 1998, creating the Hockey Fights Cancer program to raise money for research. Cullen has spent time promoting the initiative.

Prior to marrying his wife Valerie, Cullen dated Carolyn Bessette, the future wife of John F. Kennedy Jr. The two met while attending Boston University.

== Career statistics ==
=== Regular season and playoffs ===
| | | | Regular season | | | | | Playoffs |
| Season | Team | League | GP | G | A | Pts | PIM | GP | G | A | Pts | PIM |
|---|---|---|---|---|---|---|---|---|---|---|---|---|
| 1981–82 | Guelph Platers | OJHL | 42 | 45 | 49 | 94 | 34 | — | — | — | — | — |
| 1982–83 | Cambridge Winter Hawks | OJHL | 45 | 42 | 56 | 98 | 52 | — | — | — | — | — |
| 1983–84 | Boston University | ECAC | 40 | 23 | 33 | 56 | 28 | — | — | — | — | — |
| 1984–85 | Boston University | HE | 41 | 27 | 32 | 59 | 46 | — | — | — | — | — |
| 1985–86 | Boston University | HE | 43 | 25 | 49 | 74 | 54 | — | — | — | — | — |
| 1986–87 | Boston University | HE | 36 | 23 | 29 | 52 | 35 | — | — | — | — | — |
| 1987–88 | Flint Spirits | IHL | 81 | 48 | 109 | 157 | 113 | 16 | 11 | 15 | 26 | 16 |
| 1988–89 | Pittsburgh Penguins | NHL | 79 | 12 | 37 | 49 | 112 | 11 | 3 | 6 | 9 | 28 |
| 1989–90 | Pittsburgh Penguins | NHL | 72 | 32 | 60 | 92 | 138 | — | — | — | — | — |
| 1990–91 | Pittsburgh Penguins | NHL | 65 | 31 | 63 | 94 | 83 | — | — | — | — | — |
| 1990–91 | Hartford Whalers | NHL | 13 | 8 | 8 | 16 | 18 | 6 | 2 | 7 | 9 | 10 |
| 1991–92 | Hartford Whalers | NHL | 77 | 26 | 51 | 77 | 141 | 7 | 2 | 1 | 3 | 12 |
| 1992–93 | Hartford Whalers | NHL | 19 | 5 | 4 | 9 | 58 | — | — | — | — | — |
| 1992–93 | Toronto Maple Leafs | NHL | 47 | 13 | 28 | 41 | 53 | 12 | 2 | 3 | 5 | 0 |
| 1993–94 | Toronto Maple Leafs | NHL | 53 | 13 | 17 | 30 | 67 | 3 | 0 | 0 | 0 | 0 |
| 1994–95 | Pittsburgh Penguins | NHL | 46 | 13 | 24 | 37 | 66 | 9 | 0 | 2 | 2 | 8 |
| 1995–96 | Tampa Bay Lightning | NHL | 76 | 16 | 34 | 50 | 65 | 5 | 3 | 3 | 6 | 0 |
| 1996–97 | Tampa Bay Lightning | NHL | 70 | 18 | 37 | 55 | 95 | — | — | — | — | — |
| 1998–99 | Tampa Bay Lightning | NHL | 4 | 0 | 0 | 0 | 2 | — | — | — | — | — |
| 1998–99 | Cleveland Lumberjacks | IHL | 6 | 2 | 7 | 9 | 0 | — | — | — | — | — |
| NHL totals | | | 621 | 187 | 363 | 550 | 898 | 53 | 12 | 22 | 34 | 58 |

=== International ===
| Year | Team | Event | Result | GP | G | A | Pts | PIM |
|---|---|---|---|---|---|---|---|---|
| 1990 | Canada | WC | 4th | 10 | 1 | 3 | 4 | 0 |
| Senior totals | | | | 10 | 1 | 3 | 4 | 0 |

== Awards ==
Cullen is the namesake of the John Cullen Award, previously given to key IHL players.

| Award | Year |
|---|---|
College
| ECAC Rookie of the Year | 1983–84 |
| All-Hockey East First Team | 1984–85; 1985–86 |
| AHCA East Second-Team All-American | 1985–86 |
| All-Hockey East Second Team | 1986–87 |
IHL
| Gary F. Longman Memorial Trophy; James Gatschene Memorial Trophy; Leo P. Lamoureux Memorial Trophy; First Team All-Star | 1987–88 |
NHL
| Bill Masterton Memorial Trophy | 1998–99 |

== See also ==
- List of NHL players with 100-point seasons

Awards and achievements
| Preceded by George Servinis | ECAC Hockey Rookie of the Year; 1983–84 | Succeeded by Joe Nieuwendyk |
| Preceded by Jamie McLennan | Bill Masterton Trophy winner 1999 | Succeeded by Ken Daneyko |
