= Dick Bouchard =

Canadian ice hockey player

- Born: December 2, 1934 Letellier, Manitoba, Canada
- Died: September 10, 1996 (aged 61) Winnipeg, Manitoba, Canada
- Height: 5 ft 8 in (173 cm)
- Weight: 155 lb (70 kg; 11 st 1 lb)
- Position: Right wing
- Shot: Right
- Played for: New York Rangers
- Playing career: 1955–1964

Richard Joseph Bouchard (December 2, 1934 – September 10, 1996) was a Canadian ice hockey right winger. He played one game in the National Hockey League, with the New York Rangers during the 1954–55 season. The rest of his career, which lasted from 1955 to 1964, was spent in the minor leagues.

== Biography ==
Bouchard spent his junior days playing for the Quebec Frontenacs before being called up to the New York Rangers roster to play in his one and only NHL game during the 1954–55 season, on January 2, 1955 against the Boston Bruins. He then played two games for the Western Hockey League's Winnipeg Warriors before spending two seasons with the Shawinigan Falls Cataracts of the Quebec Hockey League. In 1958, Bouchard signed with the American Hockey League's Rochester Americans. After a year of inactivity, Bouchard signed for the International Hockey League's St. Paul Saints, spending three seasons with the team before playing one final season for the St. Paul Rangers of the Central Professional Hockey League before retiring.

After retirement, Bouchard stayed in the Twin Cities area and coached the high school Richfield men's hockey team from 1965 to 1973, then the Apple Valley high school from 1976 to 1980. Bouchard went on to work as a scout for the NHL with the Minnesota North Stars from 1981 to 1988 and then with the Toronto Maple Leafs from 1991 until he died in 1996.

== Personal life ==
Bouchard married Leda Desharnais in August 1958. Richard and Leda Bouchard had 5 children together named Bryan, Ronald, Guy, Lyse, and Michelle.

== Career statistics ==
=== Regular season and playoffs ===
| | | | Regular season | | | | | Playoffs |
| Season | Team | League | GP | G | A | Pts | PIM | GP | G | A | Pts | PIM |
|---|---|---|---|---|---|---|---|---|---|---|---|---|
| 1953–54 | Quebec Frontenacs | QJHL | 63 | 21 | 29 | 50 | 43 | 8 | 9 | 8 | 17 | 4 |
| 1953–54 | Quebec Frontenacs | M-Cup | — | — | — | — | — | 8 | 6 | 7 | 13 | 8 |
| 1954–55 | New York Rangers | NHL | 1 | 0 | 0 | 0 | 0 | — | — | — | — | — |
| 1954–55 | Quebec Frontenacs | QJHL | 45 | 25 | 33 | 58 | 52 | 9 | 8 | 3 | 11 | 14 |
| 1954–55 | Quebec Frontenacs | M-Cup | — | — | — | — | — | 9 | 3 | 8 | 11 | 4 |
| 1955–56 | Winnipeg Warriors | WHL | 2 | 0 | 0 | 0 | 0 | — | — | — | — | — |
| 1955–56 | Shawinigan Falls Cataractes | QSHL | 54 | 10 | 22 | 32 | 28 | 11 | 2 | 6 | 8 | 8 |
| 1956–57 | Shawinigan Falls Cataractes | QSHL | 65 | 15 | 30 | 45 | 27 | — | — | — | — | — |
| 1957–58 | Shawinigan Falls Cataractes | QSHL | 63 | 23 | 38 | 61 | 60 | 14 | 4 | 6 | 10 | 6 |
| 1958–59 | Rochester Americans | AHL | 43 | 2 | 11 | 13 | 19 | — | — | — | — | — |
| 1960–61 | St. Paul Saints | IHL | 35 | 9 | 14 | 23 | 24 | 10 | 6 | 4 | 10 | 16 |
| 1961–62 | St. Paul Saints | IHL | 57 | 27 | 31 | 58 | 48 | 11 | 6 | 2 | 8 | 8 |
| 1962–63 | St. Paul Saints | IHL | 65 | 31 | 34 | 65 | 29 | — | — | — | — | — |
| 1963–64 | St. Paul Rangers | CPHL | 29 | 6 | 11 | 17 | 16 | — | — | — | — | — |
| IHL totals | | | 157 | 67 | 79 | 146 | 101 | 21 | 12 | 6 | 18 | 24 |
| QSHL totals | | | 182 | 48 | 90 | 138 | 115 | 25 | 6 | 12 | 18 | 14 |
| NHL totals | | | 1 | 0 | 0 | 0 | 0 | — | — | — | — | — |

== See also ==
- List of players who played only one game in the NHL
