= 1960 Memorial Cup =

Canadian junior ice hockey championship

The Memorial Cup trophy

The 1960 Memorial Cup final was the 42nd junior ice hockey championship of the Canadian Amateur Hockey Association. The George Richardson Memorial Trophy champions St. Catharines Teepees of the Ontario Hockey Association in Eastern Canada competed against the Abbott Cup champions Edmonton Oil Kings of the Central Alberta Hockey League in Western Canada. The same teams played each in the 1954 Memorial Cup final. In a best-of-seven series, held at the Garden City Arena in St. Catharines, Ontario and at Maple Leaf Gardens in Toronto, Ontario, St. Catharines won their 2nd Memorial Cup, defeating Edmonton 4 games to 2.

== Scores ==
Scheduling for the 1960 Memorial Cup was supervised by Canadian Amateur Hockey Association first vice-president Jack Roxburgh. He directed the referees to be tougher on physical play and stick-swinging, due to aggressive and dangerous play.

- Game 1: Edmonton 5-3 St. Catharines (in St. Catharines)
- Game 2: St. Catharines 6-2 Edmonton (in Toronto)
- Game 3: St. Catharines 9-1 Edmonton (in Toronto)
- Game 4: Edmonton 9-7 St. Catharines (in Toronto)
- Game 5: St. Catharines 9-6 Edmonton (in Toronto)
- Game 6: St. Catharines 7-3 Edmonton (in Toronto)

== Winning roster ==
Pete Berge, John Brenneman, Larry Burns, Pete Creco, Roger Crozier, Ray Cullen, Don Grosso, Vic Hadfield, Murray Hall, Duke Harris, Bill Ives, Carlo Longarini, Chico Maki, Terry McGuire, Rich Predovich, Pete Riddle, Doug Robinson, Bill Speer. Coach: Max Kaminsky
