= Cecil Hoekstra =

Canadian ice hockey player (1935–2018)

- Born: April 2, 1935; Winnipeg, Manitoba, Canada
- Died: January 14, 2018 (aged 82); St. Catharines, Ontario, Canada
- Height: 6 ft 0 in (183 cm)
- Weight: 175 lb (79 kg; 12 st 7 lb)
- Position: Centre
- Shot: Left
- Played for: Montreal Canadiens
- Playing career: 1955–1972

Cecil Thomas Hoekstra (April 2, 1935 – January 14, 2018) was a Canadian ice hockey left winger. He played four games in the National Hockey League with the Montreal Canadiens during the 1959–60 season. The rest of his career, which lasted from 1955 to 1972, was spent in various minor leagues.

== Career ==
In the AHL, Hoekstra was a member of the Rochester Americans. He played in four NHL games for the Montreal Canadiens. After retiring from professional hockey, he became the superintendent of the Cherry Hill Club in Fort Erie, Ontario, and remained with the team for over thirty years until his retirement in 2007. He died in 2018, aged 82.

== Personal life ==
Hoekstra's brother, Ed Hoekstra, played for the Philadelphia Flyers.

== Career statistics ==
=== Regular season and playoffs ===
			Regular season					Playoffs
Season	Team	League	GP	G	A	Pts	PIM	GP	G	A	Pts	PIM
1951–52	Weston Wildcats Juveniles	MAHA	25	15	15	30	—	—	—	—	—	—
1952–53	St. Boniface Canadiens	MJHL	31	11	17	28	10	8	5	6	11	2
1952–53	St. Boniface Canadiens	M-Cup	—	—	—	—	—	17	2	14	16	0
1953–54	St. Catharines Teepees	OHA	59	24	35	59	8	14	4	8	12	0
1953–54	St. Catharines Teepees	M-Cup	—	—	—	—	—	11	2	5	7	2
1954–55	St. Catharines Teepees	OHA	49	30	50	80	24	11	5	7	12	11
1954–55	Montreal Royals	QSHL	—	—	—	—	—	3	1	0	1	0
1955–56	Montreal Royals	QSHL	34	6	5	11	8	—	—	—	—	—
1955–56	Winnipeg Warriors	WHL	28	1	9	10	4	14	0	0	0	2
1956–57	Winnipeg Warriors	WHL	69	21	12	33	16	—	—	—	—	—
1957–58	Montreal Royals	QSHL	31	13	24	37	11	7	3	4	7	0
1957–58	Rochester Americans	AHL	13	1	2	3	0	—	—	—	—	—
1958–59	Rochester Americans	AHL	70	26	24	50	4	5	1	1	2	0
1959–60	Montreal Canadiens	NHL	4	0	0	0	0	—	—	—	—	—
1959–60	Rochester Americans	AHL	69	17	32	49	2	5	1	1	2	0
1960–61	Buffalo Bisons	AHL	68	6	16	22	14	4	0	0	0	0
1961–62	Pittsburgh Hornets	AHL	68	16	31	47	16	—	—	—	—	—
1962–63	Calgary Stampeders	WHL	67	14	31	45	10	—	—	—	—	—
1963–64	Cleveland Barons	AHL	72	23	28	51	12	9	3	7	10	0
1964–65	Cleveland Barons	AHL	20	2	3	5	6	—	—	—	—	—
1965–66	Cleveland Barons	AHL	70	21	26	47	10	12	2	6	8	6
1966–67	Cleveland Barons	AHL	59	20	34	54	10	2	0	0	0	0
1967–68	Cleveland Barons	AHL	72	24	36	60	14	—	—	—	—	—
1968–69	Cleveland Barons	AHL	73	15	26	41	8	5	0	2	2	2
1969–70	Cleveland Barons	AHL	72	8	20	28	0	—	—	—	—	—
1970–71	Galt Hornets	OHA Sr	—	—	—	—	—	—	—	—	—	—
1971–72	Galt Hornets	OHA Sr	3	0	1	1	4	—	—	—	—	—
AHL totals			726	179	278	457	96	42	7	17	24	8
NHL totals			4	0	0	0	0	—	—	—	—	—

== Awards and achievements ==
- Turnbull Cup MJHL Championships (1953 & 1954)
- Memorial Cup Championship (1954)
- WHL Championship (1956)
- Edinburgh Trophy Championship (1956)
- Allan Cup Championship (1971)
- Calder Cup (AHL) Championship (1964)
- Honoured Member of the Manitoba Hockey Hall of Fame
