= 15th National Hockey League All-Star Game =

Professional ice hockey exhibition game

15th NHL All-Star Game
	1	2	3	Total
All-Stars	1	2	0	3
Chicago Black Hawks	0	1	0	1
- Date: October 7, 1961
- Arena: Chicago Stadium
- City: Chicago
- Attendance: 14,534

The 15th National Hockey League All-Star Game took place at Chicago Stadium on October 7, 1961. The NHL All-Stars defeated the hometown Chicago Black Hawks 3–1.

== Red Wing Line Leads Stars to Victory ==
The Detroit Red Wings' line of Gordie Howe, Alex Delvecchio and Norm Ullman opened and closed the scoring, as the NHL All-Stars toppled the Stanley Cup champion Chicago Black Hawks 3–1 before a record crowd of 14,534 spectators. Delvecchio opened the scoring twelve minutes into the first period on assists from Howe and Ullman, and Howe closed the scoring twelve minutes into the second period on assists from Delvecchio and Ullman. Don McKenney of the Boston Bruins also scored for the All-Stars, while Eric Nesterenko beat Toronto Maple Leafs' Johnny Bower for Chicago's only goal.

== Game summary ==
	Chicago Black Hawks	All-Stars
Final score	1	3
Head coach	Rudy Pilous	Sid Abel (Detroit Red Wings)
Lineup	1 - G Glenn Hall; 2 - D Bob Turner; 3 - D Pierre Pilote (captain); 4 - D Elmer Vasko; 5 - D Jack Evans; 6 - D Reg Fleming; 7 - C Murray Hall; 8 - RW Murray Balfour; 9 - C Bronco Horvath; 10 - LW Ron Murphy; 11 - C Bill Hay; 12 - C Gerry Melnyk; 14 - LW Ab McDonald; 15 - RW Eric Nesterenko; 16 - LW Bobby Hull; 17 - RW Ken Wharram; 18 - RW Chico Maki; 19 - D Dollard St. Laurent; 21 - C Stan Mikita	First team All-Stars: 1 - G Johnny Bower (Toronto Maple Leafs); 2 - D Doug Harvey (New York Rangers); 3 - D Marcel Pronovost (Detroit Red Wings); 5 - RW Bernie Geoffrion (Montreal Canadiens); 8 - LW Frank Mahovlich (Toronto Maple Leafs); Second team All-Stars: 21 - D Allan Stanley (Toronto Maple Leafs); 9 - RW Gordie Howe (Detroit Red Wings); 12 - LW Dickie Moore (Montreal Canadiens); 16 - C Henri Richard (Montreal Canadiens); Other players: 1 - G Gump Worsley (New York Rangers); 4 - C Phil Goyette (Montreal Canadiens); 6 - RW Andy Bathgate (New York Rangers); 7 - C Norm Ullman (Detroit Red Wings); 10 - LW Alex Delvecchio (Detroit Red Wings); 14 - RW Claude Provost (Montreal Canadiens); 17 - C Don McKenney (Boston Bruins); 18 - D Carl Brewer (Toronto Maple Leafs); 19 - D Doug Mohns (Boston Bruins); 20 - D Leo Boivin (Boston Bruins)
Scoring summary	Nesterenko (Pilote, Hull) 6:26 second (power-play)	Delvecchio (Howe, Ullman) 11:37 first; McKenney (Bathgate, Pronovost) 2:37 second; Howe (Delvecchio, Ullman) 11:38 second
Penalties	Hay 15:02 first; Vasko 19:15 first; Nesterenko 7:36 second; Nesterenko 7:36 second; Nesterenko 16:21 second; Pilote 1:38 third; Hull 19:24 third	Mahovlich 8:26 first; Goyette 4:46 second; Mahovlich 7:36 second; Mahovlich 7:36 second; McKenney 19:47 second; Richard 11:49 third
Win/loss	Glenn Hall	Johnny Bower

Shots on goal
Chicago	6	9	8	23
All-Stars	11	13	11	35

- Referee: Frank Udvari
- Linesmen: George Hayes and Neil Armstrong
- Attendance: 14,534
