= Alf Pike =

Canadian ice hockey player

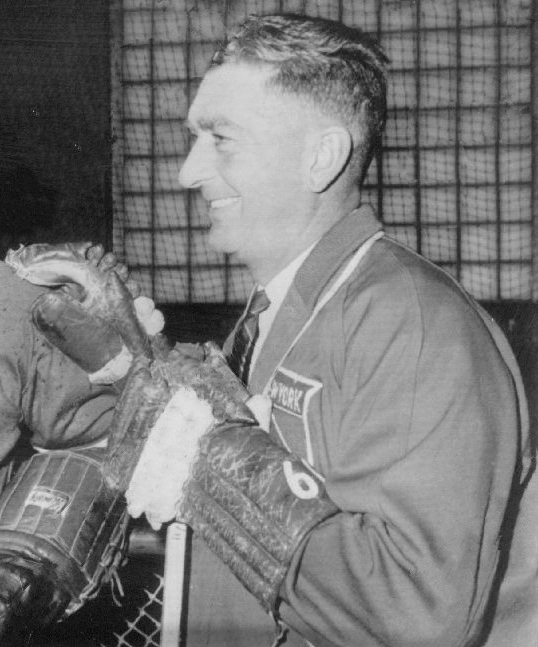
- Alf Pike in 1960
- Born: September 15, 1917 Winnipeg, Manitoba, Canada
- Died: March 1, 2009 (aged 91) Calgary, Alberta, Canada
- Height: 6 ft 0 in (183 cm)
- Weight: 187 lb (85 kg; 13 st 5 lb)
- Position: Left wing/Centre
- Shot: Left
- Played for: New York Rangers
- Playing career: 1939–1943; 1945–1947

Alfred George Pike (September 15, 1917 – March 1, 2009) was a Canadian professional ice hockey player who spent six National Hockey League (NHL) seasons with the New York Rangers between 1939 and 1947. Born in Winnipeg, Manitoba, he was a product of the hockey school there that was operated by Lester Patrick, the Rangers' coach and general manager. A licensed mortician in the offseason, Pike's nickname was "The Embalmer". He also served as coach at various levels of the sport. During World War II, Pike attained rank of Leading Aircraftsman with the Royal Canadian Air Force. He served, and played hockey, in Winnipeg and also while stationed at Leeming Yorkshire home to RCAF 427 Lion and 429 Bison heavy bomber Squadrons.

== Playing career ==
He played two years of junior hockey with the Winnipeg Monarchs of the Manitoba Junior Hockey League (MJHL). In 1936–37, his second campaign with the team, he centered the top forward line as the Monarchs captured both the league title and Memorial Cup.

After immediately signing a contract with Patrick's franchise in 1937, he spent two years with the New York Rovers, the Rangers' minor league affiliate in the Eastern Amateur Hockey League that shared Madison Square Garden III with the parent club. He was the team captain when the Rovers won the EAHL crown in 1938–39. He also made two appearances with the Philadelphia Ramblers of the International-American Hockey League (IAHL) that same season.

As a rookie with the Rangers in 1939–40, he was the center on the third forward line with Dutch Hiller and Clint Smith. Pike contributed two key goals in the 1940 Stanley Cup Final. He scored the winner in overtime of game one, and tallied again midway through the third period of game six to tie the match at 2–2 and eventually extend it beyond regulation. Bryan Hextall's goal in the extra period clinched the Stanley Cup Championship for the Rangers.

His most productive season was in 1941–42 with 27 points (8 goals, 19 assists). He was converted into a defenseman the following year. His hockey career was put on hold between 1943 and 1945 when he was stationed with the Royal Canadian Air Force in his hometown during World War II. He played two more seasons with the Rangers, the final one as a left winger in 1946–47, becoming one of the very few individuals in professional hockey history to play three different positions. His final NHL totals were 119 points (42 goals, 77 assists) in 234 games.

He appeared in a handful of matches with the Winnipeg Nationals in 1948 and 1949 before ending his playing career.

== Coaching career ==
Pike's first coaching job began in 1949–50 with the Guelph Biltmores, the Rangers' Ontario Hockey Association (OHA) Junior A farm club. The highlight of his five years with Guelph was in 1952 when the team, which featured Andy Bathgate and Harry Howell, won both the league championship and Memorial Cup. His next stop was the Winnipeg Warriors from 1954 to 1959, collecting a Western Hockey League (WHL) title and Edinburgh Trophy national minor professional championship in 1956.

He returned to the Rangers as its coach eighteen games into the 1959–60 NHL season. His personality was a direct contrast from that of the man he replaced, the temperamental Phil Watson (Muzz Patrick served as the interim for two matches). After compiling a 36–66–21 record in two years without a postseason appearance, Pike was replaced by Doug Harvey in 1961.

Before his retirement in 1970, he returned to the WHL to coach three different franchises: the Calgary Stampeders (1961–62 to 1962–63), Los Angeles Blades (1963–64 to 1964–65) and Phoenix Roadrunners (1967–68 to 1969–70).

Pike died at age 91 on March 1, 2009, in Calgary, Alberta.

== Career statistics ==
=== Regular season and playoffs ===
			Regular season					Playoffs
Season	Team	League	GP	G	A	Pts	PIM	GP	G	A	Pts	PIM
1935–36	Winnipeg Monarchs	MJHL	14	10	11	21	20	—	—	—	—	—
1936–37	Winnipeg Monarchs	MJHL	14	10	10	20	21	8	2	10	12	21
1936–37	Winnipeg Monarchs	M-Cup	—	—	—	—	—	9	7	6	13	4
1937–38	New York Rovers	EAHL	45	16	23	39	58	—	—	—	—	—
1938–39	New York Rovers	EAHL	25	9	4	13	12	—	—	—	—	—
1938–39	Philadelphia Ramblers	AHL	3	1	1	2	0	9	4	2	6	4
1939–40	New York Rangers	NHL	47	8	9	17	38	12	3	1	4	6
1940–41	New York Rangers	NHL	48	6	13	19	23	3	0	1	1	2
1941–42	New York Rangers	NHL	34	8	19	27	16	6	1	0	1	4
1942–43	New York Rangers	NHL	41	6	16	22	48	—	—	—	—	—
1943–44	Winnipeg RCAF	WNDHL	9	3	4	7	10	—	—	—	—	—
1944–45	Winnipeg Ramblers	WNDHL	9	5	2	7	20	—	—	—	—	—
1945–46	New York Rangers	NHL	33	7	9	16	18	—	—	—	—	—
1946–47	New York Rangers	NHL	31	7	11	18	2	—	—	—	—	—
1947–48	Winnipeg Nationals	MTBHL	11	5	1	6	17	—	—	—	—	—
1948–49	Winnipeg Nationals	MTBHL	2	2	4	6	4	—	—	—	—	—
NHL totals			234	42	77	119	145	21	4	2	6	12

== NHL coaching record ==
Team	Year	Regular season						Post season
Team	Year	G	W	L	T	Pts	Division rank	Result
New York Rangers	1959–60	53	14	28	11	39	6th in NHL	Missed playoffs
New York Rangers	1960–61	70	22	38	10	54	5th in NHL	Missed playoffs
NHL totals		123	36	66	21			

== Awards and achievements ==
- 1937 Turnbull Cup Championship (MJHL) – Winnipeg Monarchs (player)
- 1937 Memorial Cup Championship – Winnipeg Monarchs (player)
- 1939 Eastern Amateur Hockey League Champions – New York Rovers (player)
- 1940 Stanley Cup Championship – New York Rangers (player)
- 1952 J. Ross Robertson Cup Championship (OHA) – Guelph Biltmore Mad Hatters (coach)
- 1952 Memorial Cup Championship – Guelph Biltmore Mad Hatters (coach)
- 1956 Lester Patrick Cup Championship (WHL) – Winnipeg Warriors (coach)
- 1956 Edinburgh Trophy Championship – Winnipeg Warriors (coach)
- Honoured Member of the Manitoba Hockey Hall of Fame
- In the 2009 book 100 Ranger Greats, was ranked No. 69 all-time of the 901 New York Rangers who had played during the team's first 82 seasons

Preceded by Muzz Patrick	Head coach of the New York Rangers; 1959–61	Succeeded by Doug Harvey
