= John Draper Perrin =

Canadian business executive (1890–1967)

John Draper Perrin (August 26, 1890 – September 19, 1967) was a Canadian entrepreneur, mining executive and civic leader.

== Life and career ==
Perrin was born in Medicine Hat, North-West Territories, to William Perrin, a former British soldier in the Wolseley Expedition, (1st Battalion, 60th King's Royal Rifles) and Sergeant in the North-West Mounted Police and Sarah Lytle; both parents were Irish immigrants. Perrin attended school in Regina and Winnipeg, including Aberdeen School.

He worked for the Canadian Pacific Railway land office from 1906 to 1908, eventually embarking on a mining career. Perrin founded and developed the San Antonio Gold Mine, serving as president from 1931 to 1962. The San Antonio mine was the first dividend paying metal mine between the Great Lakes and the Rocky Mountains in Canada. He financed development of the mining town of Bissett, Manitoba.

Having successfully secured the financial support of Noah Timmins and Hollinger Mines Perrin took the stock public in 1934, one of the first in Manitoba on the Toronto Stock Exchange. The offering made him one of Canada's wealthiest citizens. He was also an early adopter of commercial aviation, organizing charter service Wings Limited, later purchased by Canadian Pacific Airways. Perrin has been credited as the first person in the world to use an aircraft to access a remote mining site. He was financier and president of the minor pro Winnipeg Warriors Hockey Club in the 1950s. Perrin was inducted with the 1955-56 Warriors team into the Manitoba Hockey Hall of Fame in the Champions category as winners of the Edinburgh Trophy.

Perrin was chairman and a key leader in the Greater Winnipeg Victory Loan organization, which put on If Day on February 19, 1942. He also served during the Second World War as National Vice Chairman of The Canadian Red Cross Prisoners of War Parcels Committee. In this capacity Perrin was the organizer and sole Director of the Winnipeg Prisoners of War Parcels Packaging Plant (the only such facility in western Canada) which packaged 2,604,990 parcels for shipment overseas to POW's. Beginning in 1948 he was also Chairman of The Children's Hospital of Winnipeg Building Committee, which successfully raised the funds necessary to build the Children's Hospital on William Avenue, opened in 1958 and now part of the Health Sciences Centre. Perrin served as a Director on the Board of the Children's Hospital from 1946 until his death in 1967. He was President of the Manitoba Club in 1953–54. At one time he owned the rural property that now makes up the largest portion of Beaudry Provincial Park (Manitoba), on the Assiniboine River near Winnipeg.

Perrin died in Winnipeg and is buried at St. Johns Cathedral Cemetery. He is commemorated by John Perrin Marsh at Beaudry Provincial Park (Manitoba) and in the Manitoba Sports Hall of Fame and Museum and the Manitoba Hockey Hall of Fame as president of the Edinburgh Trophy champions Winnipeg Warriors Hockey Club.

== Family ==
Perrin was married for 53 years to Ruth Taylor Litle; they had one son and three daughters, Alix Elizabeth, Sarah "Sally" Ruth and Marion Joan. His son J. D. "Jack" Perrin Jr. worked in the family businesses and in their hockey operations, for which he was inducted into the Manitoba Hockey Hall of Fame and the Manitoba Sports Hall of Fame and Museum. He owned Winnipeg's Olympic Rink and Fort Garry Hotel. Perrin's son-in-law Duncan Jessiman served as chair of the Board of Regents of the University of Winnipeg and was appointed to the Senate of Canada from Manitoba. Perrin's son-in-law W. J. "Jack" Hopwood served in the 1967 Winnipeg Pan American Games organizing committee and as President of the St. Charles Country Club and the Winnipeg Squash Racquet Club. Musician Johnny Perrin is his great-grandson.
