= Ed Chadwick =

Canadian ice hockey player (1933–2024)

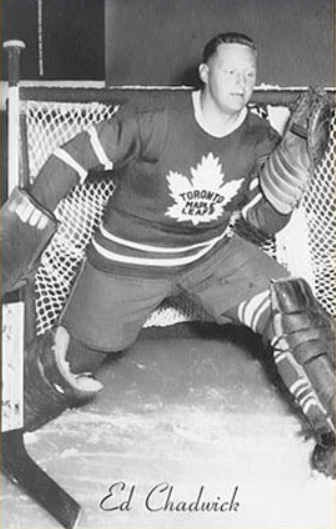
- Born: May 8, 1933 Fergus, Ontario, Canada
- Died: April 23, 2024 (aged 90) Fort Erie, Ontario, Canada
- Height: 5 ft 11 in (180 cm)
- Weight: 188 lb (85 kg; 13 st 6 lb)
- Position: Goaltender
- Caught: Left
- Played for: Toronto Maple Leafs; Boston Bruins
- Playing career: 1952–1968

Edwin Walter Chadwick (May 8, 1933 – April 23, 2024) was a Canadian ice hockey goaltender who played in the National Hockey League (NHL) for the Toronto Maple Leafs and the Boston Bruins between 1955 and 1962. The rest of his career, which lasted from 1952 to 1968, was spent in various minor leagues.

== Playing career ==
Chadwick started his NHL career in the 1955–56 season by playing five games for the Toronto Maple Leafs as a substitute for injured future Hall of Famer Harry Lumley. Over the next two seasons, he played 140 consecutive regular season games for the Leafs, which is still a team record. His playing time shrank in the next two seasons and he was shipped down to the Rochester Americans of the American Hockey League. He played only four more NHL games, as a member of the Boston Bruins in 1961–62. He spent the remainder of his playing days in the AHL, first for the Hershey Bears, and then the Buffalo Bisons before retiring in 1968.

== Later life and death ==
Later he became a scout for the Edmonton Oilers, with whom he won five Stanley Cup rings and his name appeared on the Stanley Cup in 1985, 1987, and 1990.

Chadwick died in Fort Erie, Ontario on April 23, 2024, at the age of 90.

== Career statistics ==
=== Regular season and playoffs ===
			Regular season									Playoffs
Season	Team	League	GP	W	L	T	MIN	GA	SO	GAA	SV%	GP	W	L	MIN	GA	SO	GAA	SV%
1950–51	St. Michael's Majors	OHA	40	—	—	—	2350	148	2	3.78	—	—	—	—	—	—	—	—	—
1951–52	St. Michael's Majors	OHA	49	28	17	3	2900	168	0	3.48	—	8	5	3	490	31	1	3.80	—
1952–53	St. Michael's Majors	OHA	46	—	—	—	2760	151	3	3.28	—	16	8	8	960	59	0	3.69	—
1952–53	Pittsburgh Hornets	AHL	1	1	0	0	60	1	0	1.00	—	—	—	—	—	—	—	—	—
1953–54	Stratford Indians	OHA Sr	4	—	—	—	210	17	0	4.86	—	—	—	—	—	—	—	—	—
1953–54	Pittsburgh Hornets	AHL	2	1	1	0	120	9	0	4.50	—	—	—	—	—	—	—	—	—
1954–55	Sault Ste. Marie Greyhounds	NOHA	38	—	—	—	2240	96	3	2.57	—	14	—	—	840	34	2	2.43	—
1954–55	Buffalo Bisons	AHL	2	1	1	0	120	10	0	5.00	—	—	—	—	—	—	—	—	—
1955–56	Winnipeg Warriors	WHL	68	39	27	2	—	—	2	2.96	—	20	16	4	1232	52	1	2.53	—
1955–56	Toronto Maple Leafs	NHL	5	2	0	3	300	3	2	0.60	.976	—	—	—	—	—	—	—	—
1956–57	Toronto Maple Leafs	NHL	70	21	34	15	4196	186	5	2.66	.905	—	—	—	—	—	—	—	—
1957–58	Toronto Maple Leafs	NHL	70	21	38	11	4197	223	4	3.19	.894	—	—	—	—	—	—	—	—
1958–59	Toronto Maple Leafs	NHL	31	12	15	4	1860	92	3	2.97	.905	—	—	—	—	—	—	—	—
1959–60	Toronto Maple Leafs	NHL	4	1	2	1	240	15	0	3.75	.889	—	—	—	—	—	—	—	—
1959–60	Rochester Americans	AHL	67	39	24	4	4020	184	4	2.75	—	12	5	7	720	35	0	2.92	—
1960–61	Rochester Americans	AHL	71	32	35	4	4300	236	2	3.29	—	—	—	—	—	—	—	—	—
1961–62	Boston Bruins	NHL	4	0	3	1	240	22	0	5.50	.852	—	—	—	—	—	—	—	—
1961–62	Kingston Frontenacs	EPHL	67	36	23	8	4020	214	2	3.19	—	11	6	5	671	36	1	3.22	—
1962–63	Hershey Bears	AHL	68	34	26	7	4080	219	6	3.22	—	15	8	7	922	42	1	2.73	—
1963–64	Hershey Bears	AHL	57	31	22	3	3340	189	2	3.40	—	6	3	3	360	29	0	4.84	—
1964–65	Buffalo Bisons	AHL	61	33	21	6	3696	186	5	3.02	—	9	5	4	542	18	2	1.99	—
1965–66	Buffalo Bisons	AHL	34	14	18	1	1983	102	3	3.09	—	—	—	—	—	—	—	—	—
1966–67	Buffalo Bisons	AHL	36	5	23	2	1829	158	0	5.18	—	—	—	—	—	—	—	—	—
1967–68	Buffalo Bisons	AHL	18	5	8	1	881	55	1	3.75	—	1	0	0	53	5	0	5.66	—
NHL totals			184	57	92	35	11033	541	14	2.94	.901	—	—	—	—	—	—	—	—

== Awards ==
- AHL First All-Star Team (1960)
- AHL Second All-Star team (1961, 1965)
- Harry "Hap" Holmes Memorial Award Winner for fewest goals allowed in the AHL (1960)
- NHL - Stanley Cup (Edmonton) (1987, 1990)
