= Barry Cullen =

Canadian ice hockey player (1935–2022)

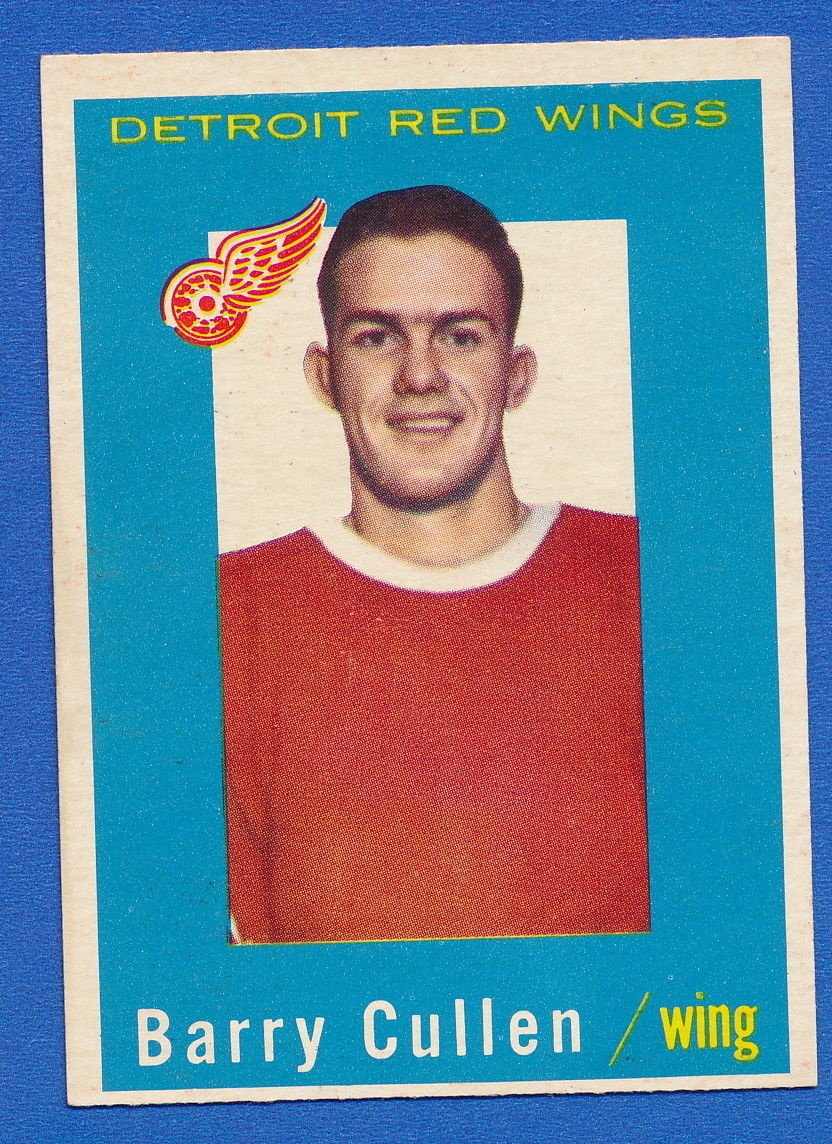
- Cullen with the Detroit Red Wings, c. 1959
- Born: June 16, 1935; Ottawa, Ontario, Canada
- Died: December 16, 2022 (aged 87); Guelph, Ontario, Canada
- Height: 6 ft 0 in (183 cm)
- Weight: 175 lb (79 kg; 12 st 7 lb)
- Position: Right wing
- Shot: Right
- Played for: Toronto Maple Leafs; Detroit Red Wings
- Playing career: 1953–1964

Charles Francis "Barry" Cullen (June 16, 1935 – December 16, 2022) was a Canadian ice hockey right winger who played five seasons in the National Hockey League (NHL).

Cullen began his NHL career with the Toronto Maple Leafs in 1955, where he played alongside his brother Brian. He ended his career in 1960, with the Detroit Red Wings. His younger brother Ray also played in the NHL. Cullen's eldest son, Terry, played for the Michigan Wolverines, where he was hit from behind and broke his neck. Cullen's fourth child, John, played for the Boston University Terriers and in the NHL for the Pittsburgh Penguins, Hartford Whalers, Toronto Maple Leafs, and Tampa Bay Lightning.

Cullen lived in Guelph, Ontario where he owned a car dealership. He died in Guelph on December 16, 2022, at the age of 87.

== Career statistics ==
=== Regular season and playoffs ===
| | | | Regular season | | | | | Playoffs |
| Season | Team | League | GP | G | A | Pts | PIM | GP | G | A | Pts | PIM |
|---|---|---|---|---|---|---|---|---|---|---|---|---|
| 1953–54 | St. Catharines Teepees | OHA | 58 | 62 | 45 | 107 | 35 | 15 | 9 | 7 | 16 | 13 |
| 1953–54 | St. Catharines Teepees | M-Cup | — | — | — | — | — | 11 | 8 | 9 | 17 | 12 |
| 1954–55 | St. Catharines Teepees | OHA | 49 | 45 | 42 | 87 | 87 | 11 | 9 | 5 | 14 | 34 |
| 1955–56 | Toronto Maple Leafs | NHL | 3 | 0 | 0 | 0 | 4 | — | — | — | — | — |
| 1955–56 | Winnipeg Warriors | WHL | 67 | 38 | 34 | 72 | 72 | 14 | 7 | 6 | 13 | 14 |
| 1956–57 | Toronto Maple Leafs | NHL | 51 | 6 | 10 | 16 | 30 | — | — | — | — | — |
| 1956–57 | Rochester Americans | AHL | 7 | 4 | 4 | 8 | 6 | — | — | — | — | — |
| 1957–58 | Toronto Maple Leafs | NHL | 70 | 16 | 25 | 41 | 31 | — | — | — | — | — |
| 1958–59 | Toronto Maple Leafs | NHL | 40 | 6 | 8 | 14 | 15 | 2 | 0 | 0 | 0 | 0 |
| 1959–60 | Detroit Red Wings | NHL | 54 | 4 | 9 | 13 | 23 | 4 | 0 | 0 | 0 | 2 |
| 1959–60 | Hershey Bears | AHL | 7 | 2 | 2 | 4 | 0 | — | — | — | — | — |
| 1960–61 | Buffalo Bisons | AHL | 71 | 16 | 37 | 53 | 59 | 4 | 1 | 0 | 1 | 10 |
| 1961–62 | Buffalo Bisons | AHL | 69 | 41 | 53 | 94 | 61 | 11 | 2 | 4 | 6 | 10 |
| 1962–63 | Buffalo Bisons | AHL | 53 | 20 | 23 | 43 | 20 | 13 | 3 | 3 | 6 | 14 |
| 1963–64 | Buffalo Bisons | AHL | 72 | 23 | 38 | 61 | 32 | — | — | — | — | — |
| AHL totals | | | 279 | 106 | 157 | 263 | 178 | 28 | 6 | 7 | 13 | 34 |
| NHL totals | | | 218 | 32 | 52 | 84 | 103 | 6 | 0 | 0 | 0 | 2 |

== Awards and achievements ==
- WHL Rookie of the Year Award (1956)
- AHL First All-Star Team (1962)

== See also ==
- List of family relations in the NHL
