= Fred Burchell (ice hockey) =

Canadian ice hockey player (1931 - 1998)

- Burchell, 1947 Montreal Royals
- Born: January 9, 1931; Montreal, Quebec, Canada
- Died: June 4, 1998 (aged 67); Montreal, Quebec, Canada
- Height: 5 ft 6 in (168 cm)
- Weight: 145 lb (66 kg; 10 st 5 lb)
- Position: Centre
- Shot: Left
- Played for: Montreal Canadiens
- Playing career: 1949–1966

Frederick Leo Gerald Burchell (January 9, 1931 – June 4, 1998) was a Canadian professional ice hockey player. He played four games in the National Hockey League with the Montreal Canadiens: two games in each the 1950–51 and 1953–54 seasons. The rest of his career, which lasted from 1949 to 1966, was spent in the minor leagues. Burchell was born in Montreal, Quebec.

== Career ==
Burchell began his hockey career when he played two games for the Montreal Royals of the Quebec Senior Hockey League in 1949. He played the next season with the Montreal Canadiens of the National Hockey League. He moved on to the Eastern Hockey League to play for the Johnstown Jets, where he finally found his scoring touch (37 goals and 56 assists). He played for the next two seasons for the Montreal Royals again (during their league transition into a semi-pro league). He was again called up to the Canadiens and again played two games and went pointless. He returned to the Montreal Royals before joining the Winnipeg Warriors. He began scoring more consistently as he re-joined the QHL Montreal Royals and stayed with their years when they joined the Eastern Professional Hockey League, where he won that league's MVP award in 1961. He spent the next few seasons in the American Hockey League with the Quebec Aces before playing for one final season with the Jersey Devils in the EHL.

Burchell coached the Toledo Hornets of the International Hockey League during the 1973–74 season, where he led the team to a record of 33 wins, 42 losses, and one tie.

== Career statistics ==
=== Regular season and playoffs ===
| | | | Regular season | | | | | Playoffs |
| Season | Team | League | GP | G | A | Pts | PIM | GP | G | A | Pts | PIM |
|---|---|---|---|---|---|---|---|---|---|---|---|---|
| 1947–48 | Montreal Junior Royals | QJAHA | 2 | 3 | 0 | 3 | 0 | 10 | 1 | 5 | 6 | 0 |
| 1948–49 | Montreal Junior Royals | QJAHA | 47 | 10 | 25 | 35 | 15 | 10 | 4 | 6 | 10 | 7 |
| 1948–49 | Montreal Junior Royals | M-Cup | — | — | — | — | — | 15 | 4 | 8 | 12 | 12 |
| 1949–50 | Montreal Junior Royals | QJHL | 1 | 0 | 1 | 1 | 0 | — | — | — | — | — |
| 1949–50 | Laval Titan | QJHL | 34 | 22 | 54 | 76 | 47 | 7 | 4 | 5 | 9 | 4 |
| 1949–50 | Montreal Royals | QSHL | 2 | 0 | 0 | 0 | 0 | — | — | — | — | — |
| 1950–51 | Montreal Canadiens | NHL | 2 | 0 | 0 | 0 | 0 | — | — | — | — | — |
| 1950–51 | Montreal Nationale | QPJHL | 45 | 48 | 76 | 124 | 46 | 3 | 0 | 1 | 1 | 6 |
| 1951–52 | Johnstown Jets | EAHL | 56 | 37 | 56 | 93 | 73 | 8 | 2 | 12 | 14 | 12 |
| 1952–53 | Montreal Royals | QSHL | 52 | 18 | 38 | 56 | 41 | 11 | 0 | 0 | 0 | 9 |
| 1953–54 | Montreal Canadiens | NHL | 2 | 0 | 0 | 0 | 0 | — | — | — | — | — |
| 1953–54 | Montreal Royals | QSHL | 66 | 31 | 59 | 90 | 34 | 11 | 2 | 8 | 10 | 6 |
| 1954–55 | Montreal Royals | QSHL | 61 | 19 | 41 | 60 | 50 | 13 | 2 | 2 | 4 | 6 |
| 1955–56 | Winnipeg Warriors | WHL | 61 | 11 | 47 | 58 | 48 | 14 | 7 | 12 | 19 | 8 |
| 1955–56 | Montreal Royals | QSHL | 5 | 1 | 3 | 4 | 4 | — | — | — | — | — |
| 1956–57 | Winnipeg Warriors | WHL | 66 | 17 | 40 | 57 | 22 | — | — | — | — | — |
| 1957–58 | Rochester Americans | AHL | 70 | 20 | 40 | 60 | 65 | — | — | — | — | — |
| 1958–59 | Montreal Royals | QSHL | 59 | 11 | 41 | 52 | 31 | 8 | 7 | 2 | 9 | 4 |
| 1959–60 | Montreal Royals | EPHL | 67 | 12 | 58 | 70 | 44 | 13 | 7 | 8 | 15 | 2 |
| 1960–61 | Montreal Royals | EPHL | 68 | 13 | 61 | 74 | 12 | — | — | — | — | — |
| 1961–62 | Quebec Aces | AHL | 67 | 21 | 57 | 78 | 14 | — | — | — | — | — |
| 1962–63 | Quebec Aces | AHL | 69 | 17 | 55 | 72 | 12 | — | — | — | — | — |
| 1963–64 | Quebec Aces | AHL | 58 | 4 | 30 | 34 | 10 | 8 | 1 | 2 | 3 | 0 |
| 1964–65 | Verdun Pirates | QUE Sr | — | — | — | — | — | — | — | — | — | — |
| 1964–65 | Sherbrooke Castors | ETSHL | — | — | — | — | — | — | — | — | — | — |
| 1964–65 | Sherbrooke Castors | Al-Cup | — | — | — | — | — | 15 | 6 | 17 | 23 | 2 |
| 1965–66 | Jersey Devils | EHL | 2 | 1 | 0 | 1 | 2 | — | — | — | — | — |
| 1965–66 | St-Hyacinthe Saints | QUE Sr | 32 | 10 | 31 | 41 | 6 | 12 | 6 | 11 | 17 | 2 |
| AHL totals | | | 264 | 62 | 182 | 244 | 101 | 8 | 1 | 2 | 3 | 0 |
| NHL totals | | | 4 | 0 | 0 | 0 | 2 | — | — | — | — | — |

== Awards and achievements ==
- Memorial Cup Championship (1949)
- QJHL Second All-Star Team (1950, 1951)
- EAHL First All-Star Team (1952)
- QHL First All-Star Team (1954)
- 1960–61 EPHL Most Valuable Player (shared with Cliff Pennington)
