= Gordie Byers =

Canadian ice hockey player (1930–2001)

- Born: March 11, 1930 Eganville, Ontario, Canada
- Died: November 2, 2001 (aged 71) Langley, British Columbia, Canada
- Height: 5 ft 10 in (178 cm)
- Weight: 182 lb (83 kg; 13 st 0 lb)
- Position: Defence
- Shot: Right
- Played for: Boston Bruins
- Playing career: 1949–1957

Gordon Charles "Gord" Byers (March 11, 1930 – November 2, 2001) was a Canadian professional ice hockey player. Byers played most of his career in the minor leagues. He played one game in the National Hockey League for the Boston Bruins during the 1949–50 season.

== Playing career ==
After spending his junior days with the Copper Cliff Jr. Redmen and the St. Catharines Teepees, Byers played one game in the National Hockey League for the Boston Bruins during the 1949–50 season and well as two games for the Boston Olympics. The next season, Byers would then have spells in the United States Hockey League for the Kansas City Mohawks and the Tulsa Oilers in what would turn out to be the USHL's final year in operation before folding. He would end up returning to the Olympics for a season before joining the Troy Uncle Sam's Trojans. Both teams folded at the conclusion of the respective seasons with the Trojans folding after just one season. After a season of senior hockey with the Chatham Maroons, Byers finished his career in the Northern Ontario Hockey Association with the Sudbury Wolves before retiring.

== Career statistics ==
=== Regular season and playoffs ===
| | | | Regular season | | | | | Playoffs |
| Season | Team | League | GP | G | A | Pts | PIM | GP | G | A | Pts | PIM |
|---|---|---|---|---|---|---|---|---|---|---|---|---|
| 1947–48 | Copper Cliff Jr. Redmen | NBHL | 8 | 0 | 2 | 2 | 10 | 3 | 1 | 1 | 2 | 2 |
| 1947–48 | Copper Cliff Jr. Redmen | M-Cup | — | — | — | — | — | 7 | 2 | 2 | 4 | 12 |
| 1948–49 | St. Catharines Teepees | OHA | 29 | 2 | 2 | 4 | 63 | 5 | 0 | 1 | 1 | 11 |
| 1949–50 | St. Catharines Teepees | OHA | 41 | 5 | 17 | 22 | 102 | 5 | 0 | 1 | 1 | 8 |
| 1949–50 | Boston Bruins | NHL | 1 | 0 | 1 | 1 | 0 | — | — | — | — | — |
| 1949–50 | Boston Olympics | EAHL | 2 | 0 | 1 | 1 | 6 | 5 | 0 | 2 | 2 | 9 |
| 1950–51 | Tulsa Oilers | USHL | 61 | 6 | 7 | 13 | 67 | — | — | — | — | — |
| 1951–52 | Boston Olympics | EAHL | 50 | 0 | 5 | 5 | 100 | — | — | — | — | — |
| 1952–53 | Troy Uncle Sam's Trojans | EAHL | 56 | 3 | 13 | 16 | 103 | — | — | — | — | — |
| 1953–54 | Chatham Maroons | OHA Sr | 43 | 1 | 10 | 11 | 133 | 6 | 2 | 1 | 3 | 18 |
| 1954–55 | Sudbury Wolves | NOHA | 14 | 0 | 1 | 1 | 20 | — | — | — | — | — |
| 1955–56 | Sudbury Wolves | NOHA | 5 | 1 | 0 | 1 | 10 | — | — | — | — | — |
| NHL totals | | | 1 | 0 | 1 | 1 | 0 | — | — | — | — | — |

== See also ==
- List of players who played only one game in the NHL
