= Brian Cullen =

Canadian retired ice hockey forward

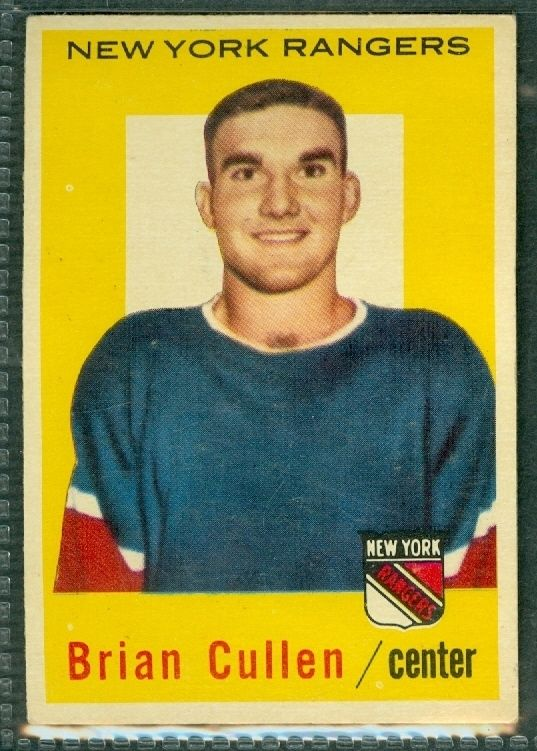
- Cullen with the New York Rangers, c. 1959
- Born: November 11, 1933 (age 92) Ottawa, Ontario, Canada
- Height: 5 ft 10 in (178 cm)
- Weight: 165 lb (75 kg; 11 st 11 lb)
- Position: Centre
- Shot: Left
- Played for: Toronto Maple Leafs; New York Rangers
- Playing career: 1951–1963

Brian Joseph Cullen (born November 11, 1933) is a Canadian former professional ice hockey centre who played seven seasons in the National Hockey League (NHL).

Cullen began his NHL career with the Toronto Maple Leafs in 1954. He also played two seasons with the New York Rangers. He left the NHL after the 1961 season, playing two more seasons with the Buffalo Bisons of the American Hockey League (AHL), before retiring from hockey following the 1963 season. He is the brother of fellow hockey players Barry Cullen and Ray Cullen. After retiring from professional hockey, Cullen became an auto dealership owner.

== Career statistics ==
=== Regular season and playoffs ===
			Regular season					Playoffs
Season	Team	League	GP	G	A	Pts	PIM	GP	G	A	Pts	PIM
1951–52	St. Catharines Teepees	OHA	54	30	31	61	25	14	7	6	13	4
1951–52	Buffalo Bisons	AHL	1	0	0	0	0	—	—	—	—	—
1952–53	St. Catharines Teepees	OHA	56	41	28	69	29	3	4	0	4	2
1952–53	Buffalo Bisons	AHL	3	1	5	6	0	—	—	—	—	—
1953–54	St. Catharines Teepees	OHA	59	68	93	161	40	15	12	17	29	18
1953–54	St. Catharines Teepees	M-Cup	—	—	—	—	—	11	10	14	24	18
1954–55	Toronto Maple Leafs	NHL	27	3	5	8	6	4	1	0	1	0
1954–55	Pittsburgh Hornets	AHL	36	11	25	36	20	—	—	—	—	—
1955–56	Toronto Maple Leafs	NHL	21	2	6	8	8	5	1	0	1	2
1955–56	Winnipeg Warriors	WHL	50	16	35	51	10	—	—	—	—	—
1956–57	Toronto Maple Leafs	NHL	46	8	12	20	27	—	—	—	—	—
1956–57	Rochester Americans	AHL	9	2	10	12	2	—	—	—	—	—
1957–58	Toronto Maple Leafs	NHL	67	20	23	43	29	—	—	—	—	—
1958–59	Toronto Maple Leafs	NHL	59	4	14	18	10	10	1	0	1	0
1959–60	New York Rangers	NHL	64	8	21	29	6	—	—	—	—	—
1960–61	New York Rangers	NHL	42	11	19	30	6	—	—	—	—	—
1960–61	Buffalo Bisons	AHL	15	6	6	12	9	4	0	0	0	0
1961–62	Buffalo Bisons	AHL	67	22	59	81	18	11	5	3	8	11
1962–63	Buffalo Bisons	AHL	31	5	17	22	23	5	1	0	1	0
NHL totals			326	56	100	156	92	19	3	0	3	2

== Awards and achievements ==
- OHL MVP (1954)
- OHL First All-Star Team (1954)

== See also ==
- List of family relations in the NHL
