= If Day =

Simulated Nazi invasion of Winnipeg, Manitoba (1942)

Coordinates: 49°53′44″N 97°08′19″W

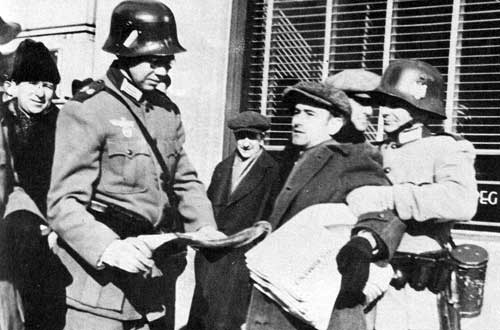
Simulated German soldiers harassing a newspaper carrier during If Day

If Day (French: Si un jour, lit. 'If one day') was a simulated Nazi German invasion and occupation of the Canadian city of Winnipeg, Manitoba, and surrounding areas on 19 February 1942, during the Second World War. It was organized as a war bond promotion by the Greater Winnipeg Victory Loan organization, which was led by prominent Winnipeg businessman J. D. Perrin. The event was the largest military exercise in Winnipeg to that point.

If Day included a staged firefight between Canadian troops and volunteers dressed as German soldiers, the internment of prominent politicians, the imposition of Nazi rule, and a parade. The event was a fundraiser for the war effort: over $3 million was collected in Winnipeg on that day. Organizers believed that the fear induced by the event would help increase fundraising objectives.

== Background ==
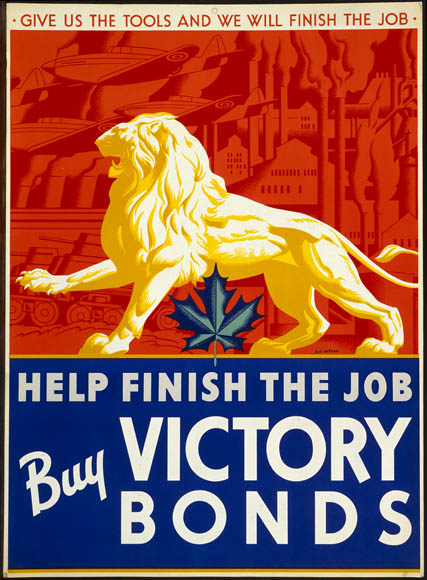
A. J. Casson's Canadian Victory Bonds poster Give Us The Tools 1941

If Day was an elaborate campaign to promote the purchase of Victory Bonds. These bonds, which were loans to the government to allow for increased war spending, were sold to individuals and corporations throughout Canada. If Day was the second Victory Loan campaign of the Second World War. The campaign began on 16 February 1942, and continued until 9 March. Manitoba's fundraising target was $45 million ($806 million in 2024 dollars), including $24.5 million from Winnipeg. The national campaign planned to light "Beacon Fires of Freedom" in communities across the country, but Winnipeg's February weather was not conducive to this idea, leading to the Greater Winnipeg Victory Loan committee, a regional branch of the National War Finance Committee, under chairman John Draper Perrin, to opt for a different approach. The organizers believed that bringing the war (or, rather, a simulation thereof) to people's homes would result in a change of attitude among those not directly affected by the war.

The committee drew up a map of Manitoba, which was divided into 45 sections, each representing $1 million of their fundraising target. As money came in from those selling Victory Bonds, the sections were "reclaimed" from the Nazi invaders. The map was posted at the corner of Portage and Main, the city's central intersection. The campaign was publicized in local newspapers for a few days before the event, although the "invasion" took many citizens by surprise. To prevent a rush to emergency shelters, residents of neighbouring northern Minnesota were also warned because radio broadcasts dramatizing the event could be received in that area. (Note: Organizers hoped to avoid a similar situation to the 1938 radio drama The War of the Worlds, when a fictional broadcast of an alien invasion was interpreted as real by frightened citizens.) Royal Canadian Air Force aircraft painted to look like German fighter planes flew over the city on 18 February 1942. Selkirk, a small town northeast of Winnipeg, held its own fundraising simulation, a one-hour blackout and mock bombing, on 18 February 1942 in preparation for the main If Day event.

== Events ==
The simulation included 3,500 Canadian Army members, representing all of Winnipeg's units, making it the largest military exercise in Winnipeg to that point. The defending forces were commanded by Colonels E. A. Pridham and D. S. McKay. Troops were drawn from the Fifth Field Regiment, the Royal Winnipeg Rifles, the Winnipeg Grenadiers, the Queen's Own Cameron Highlanders of Canada, and a number of reserve and civilian groups. The 'Nazi' troops were volunteers from the Young Men's Board of Trade, using uniforms rented from Hollywood and with painted sabre scars on their faces. They were commanded by Erich von Neuremburg. (Note: It is unclear whether this was a real name or a pseudonym, and is also spelled Neurenberg in some sources.) Approximately $3,000 was spent on the event.

'Nazi' patrols in the city began before 5:30 am on 19 February. A radio announcer was detained and his microphone commandeered for radio broadcasts, beginning at 5:45 am. 'Nazi' troops assembled on the west side of the city half an hour after the first patrols. Canadian troops were massed at Fort Osborne barracks and the Minto and McGregor armouries at 6:30 am, and at 7:00 am air-raid sirens were sounded and a blackout ordered in preparation for the invasion. The aerial blitzkrieg began before 7 am with mock bombings. Beginning at 7:03 am, troops started their simulated attack on the city, which was defended by a small group of active and reserve troops assisted by local community groups. The defenders formed a perimeter around the industrial and downtown areas of the city, approximately 5 kilometres (3 mi) from City Hall, retreating to a 3-kilometre (2 mi) perimeter at 7:45.

The firefight included large-scale troop movements and the simulated destruction of major bridges – coal dust and dynamite were used to create explosions. Nine troop formations held three positions each during the tightly scripted invasion sequence; they were directed via telephone (one line per formation) and flash-lamp signals from the headquarters established at the Chamber of Commerce building. The defensive pattern employed was similar to that used during the First World War in Paris to conduct soldiers to the front. Light tanks were stationed at road and rail junctions as fighting intensified. Thirty anti-aircraft vehicles fired blanks at fighter planes overhead, assisted by anti-aircraft gunners on buildings downtown. The first mock casualty was reported at 8:00 am. Dressing stations were set up at strategic points to treat the mock casualties; they also treated the two real casualties of the event – a soldier who sprained his ankle, and a woman who cut her thumb preparing toast during the early-morning blackout.

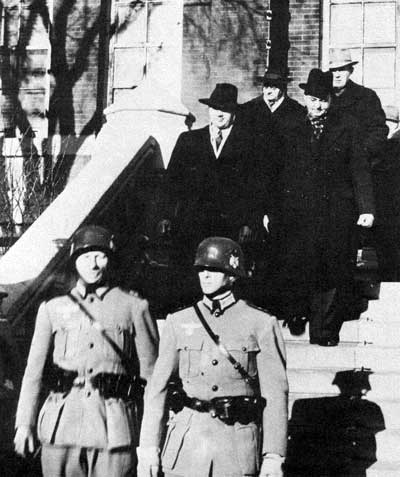
City officials being arrested and taken to the internment camp

At 9:30 am, the defenders surrendered to the 'Nazis' and withdrew to the downtown muster point, and the city was occupied. The fake Nazis began a widespread harassment campaign, sending armed troops throughout the city. A tank was driven down Portage Avenue, one of the main streets of the downtown area. Some people were taken to an internment camp at Lower Fort Garry; those interned included prominent local politicians like Premier John Bracken (arrested with several members of his cabinet at a caucus meeting), Mayor John Queen, Lieutenant Governor of Manitoba Roland Fairbairn McWilliams, and visiting Norwegian ambassador to the United States Wilhelm de Morgenstierne. One council member, Dan McClean, escaped but was recaptured after an intensive search. Chief of Police George Smith avoided capture because he was dining out when soldiers arrived at his office. The Union Flag at Lower Fort Garry was replaced with the swastika. The city was renamed "Himmlerstadt", and Main Street was termed "Hitlerstrasse".

Erich von Neuremburg was installed as gauleiter (provincial leader); he was assisted by George Waight, who acted as the local Gestapo chief. Their stated purpose was to assist Hitler in his plans to take advantage of Canada's relatively low population density by colonizing the country. Von Neuremburg issued the following decree, which was posted throughout the city:

1. This territory is now a part of the Greater Reich and under the jurisdiction of Col. Erich Von Neuremburg, Gauleiter of the Fuehrer.
2. No civilians will be permitted on the streets between 9:30 pm and daybreak.
3. All public places are out of bounds to civilians, and not more than 8 persons can gather at one time in any place.
4. Every householder must provide billeting for 5 soldiers.
5. All organizations of a military, semi-military or fraternal nature are hereby disbanded and banned. Girl Guide, Boy Scout and similar youth organizations will remain in existence but under direction of the Gauleiter and Storm troops.
6. All owners of motor cars, trucks and buses must register same at Occupation Headquarters where they will be taken over by the Army of Occupation.
7. Each farmer must immediately report all stocks of grain and livestock and no farm produce may be sold except through the office of the Kommandant of supplies in Winnipeg. He may not keep any for his own consumption but must buy it back through the Central Authority in Winnipeg.
8. All national emblems excluding the Swastika must be immediately destroyed.
9. Each inhabitant will be furnished with a ration card, and food and clothing may only be purchased on presentation of this card.
10. The following offences will result in death without trial
  1. Attempting to organize resistance against the Army of Occupation
  2. Entering or leaving the province without permission.
  3. Failure to report all goods possessed when ordered to do so.
  4. Possession of firearms.

NO ONE WILL ACT, SPEAK OR THINK CONTRARY TO OUR DECREES.

The masthead of the Winnipeg Tribune, 19 February 1942

Notices were posted on churches forbidding worship services, and priests who objected were arrested. Buses were stopped and their passengers searched by armed troops. The Winnipeg Tribune was renamed Das Winnipeger Lügenblatt ("The Winnipeg Lies-sheet"), a 'Nazi' publication featuring heavily censored columns and a front page written almost entirely in German. One satirical story noted that "this is a great day for Manitoba ...The Nazis, like Der Fuehrer, are patient, kind and tolerant, but THEIR PATIENCE IS RAPIDLY EXHAUSTED BECOMING", while another included an "official joke", approved by the German authorities, at which all readers were ordered to laugh or be imprisoned. Henry Weppler, a newspaper seller for the Winnipeg Free Press, was attacked and his papers ripped up. The Winnipeg Free Press featured a front-page story about the "invasion", describing in great detail the devastation caused by the Nazis in Winnipeg.

Books were burned in front of the main Carnegie branch of the Winnipeg Public Library (the books had been pre-selected for incineration as damaged or outdated). Soldiers entered the cafeteria at Great West Life and stole lunches from workers. They seized buffalo coats from the police station and wore them throughout the day, as the temperature was below −8 °C (18 °F). At one local elementary school, the principal was arrested and replaced with a 'Nazi' educator dedicated to teaching the "Nazi Truth"; special lessons were prepared for high-school students throughout the city. Some stores and homes were looted by the fake troops. Canadian currency was replaced with fake German Reichsmarks, the only propaganda notes that Canada created during the war.

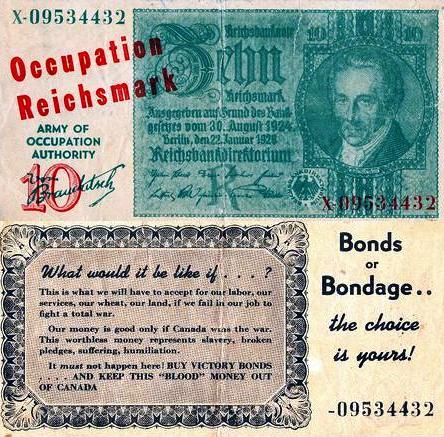
Fake German Reichsmarks; the reverse features an advertisement for Victory Loans.

The day ended at 5:30 pm with a ceremonial release of prisoners, a parade, and speeches from the released dignitaries. Members of the organizing committee and local businesspeople marched down Portage Avenue with banners reading "It MUST Not Happen Here!" and "Buy Victory Bonds". Following the parade, a banquet was held at the Hudson's Bay Company building. Ambassador de Morgenstierne spoke about his experiences with If Day and in Norway, suggesting that the "make-believe Nazi occupation of [Winnipeg] was an authentic glimpse of German behavior in German-ridden Europe".

Surrounding towns were also affected by the invasion: for example, in Neepawa, 'Nazi' soldiers confronted citizens in the streets. Virden was renamed "Virdenberg". A mock attack was planned for strategic targets in Brandon. The Canadian Broadcasting Corporation broadcast a program called "Swastika over Canada" on the radio throughout the province, along with military music and extracts of Hitler's speeches; students were dismissed from school early to listen.

== Effects ==
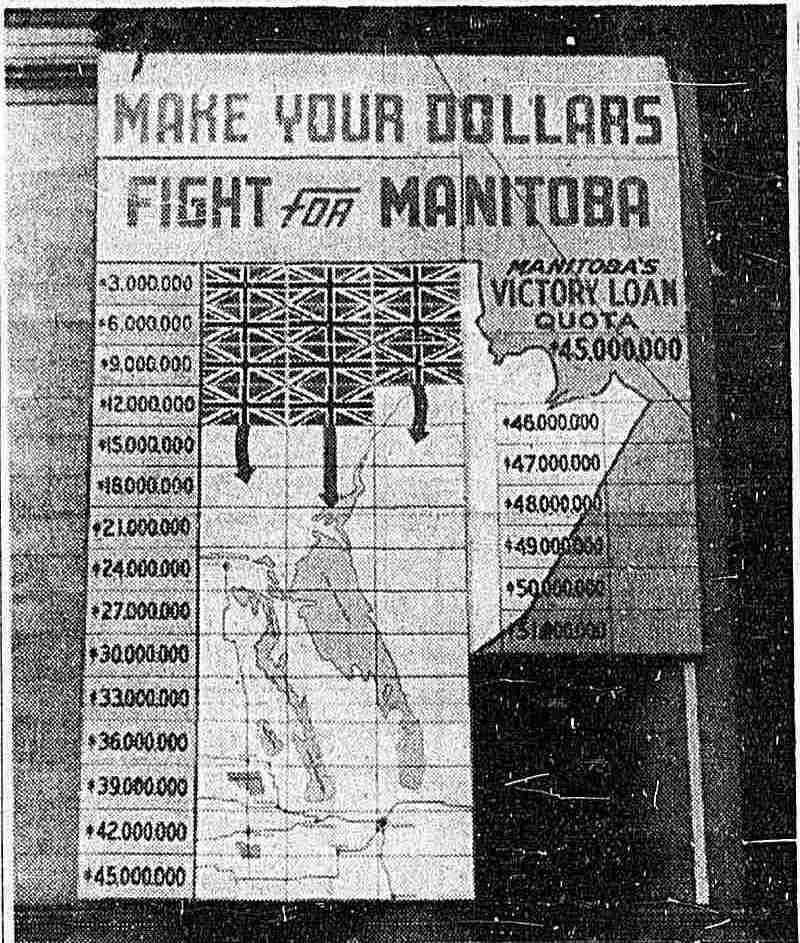
Map showing the sale of Victory Bonds in Manitoba

If Day pushed Victory Bond sales well over Greater Winnipeg's goal, and brought the tactic to the attention of people throughout North America. Life Magazine ran a pictorial spread of the If Day activities in Winnipeg and smaller centres across Manitoba, photographed by William Shrout. Reporters from several American publications, including Newsweek, The New York Times and The Christian Science Monitor, were also present; cameraman Lucien Roy shot newsreel footage for Paramount News. Newspapers in New Zealand included stories about the event. An estimated 40 million people worldwide saw coverage.

If Day raised $3.2 million for the Victory Loan campaign, which was the city's largest single-day total. Winnipeg passed its $24 million Victory Loan quota on 24 February, largely because of If Day. The campaign's provincial total was $60 million, well above its target quota of $45 million. It raised approximately $2 billion nationwide for the war effort, and If Day was considered one of the most successful fundraising events of the nationwide drive. The army had expected a significant increase in recruits on If Day, but it failed to end the long-term decline in recruitment numbers: only 23 people enlisted in Winnipeg, compared to an average of 36 per day for the first half of February.

If Day was successful enough to spark imitations in other communities. The US government contacted the organizing committee for details of the event. A smaller-scale invasion was staged in Vancouver, using promotional materials from the Winnipeg campaign.

In 2006, a television documentary of the event was made by Aaron Floresco for CTV's local series Manitoba Moments. It incorporates newsreel footage as well as interviews of historians and participants. Filmmaker Guy Maddin included a brief newsreel clip of If Day in his film My Winnipeg.

== See also ==
- Nazi plans for North America
- Mosinee, Wisconsin: an American city that had a similar mock invasion by "Communists" on May 1, 1950.
