= Winnipeg Warriors (minor pro) =

Canadian hockey team

Winnipeg Warriors logo

The Winnipeg Warriors were a minor league hockey team that played in the Western Hockey League from 1955 to 1961. Owned by Winnipeg's prominent Perrin family, the Warriors represented the return of professional hockey to Winnipeg after a 27-year absence.

== History ==
In 1955, the Warriors Club was the first tenant in the brand-new Winnipeg Arena. The grand opening of Winnipeg Arena occurred on October 18, 1955, during the Warriors' WHL season opening game against the Calgary Stampeders (hockey) club. The ceremonial faceoff, conducted by John Draper Perrin, Sr., President of the Warriors, occurred before a standing room crowd of 9,671 fans, the largest in WHL history. Captained by Fred Shero, the team also included Bill Mosienko, Eric Nesterenko, Danny Summers, Gary Aldcorn, Cecil Hoekstra, Fred Burchell, Bill Burega, Barry Cullen, Mickey Keating, Eddie Mazur and Ed Chadwick.

The 1955–56 Warriors, managed by J. D. "Jack" Perrin, Jr. and coached by Alf Pike, went on to win the Edinburgh Trophy. After six seasons, due to financial issues relating to their long WHL traveling distances and uncompetitive rents levied by Winnipeg Enterprises, owners of Winnipeg Arena, Warriors owner Jack Perrin asked for a leave of absence from the WHL, which was granted. However, the Warriors never returned to the league.

The 1956, Winnipeg Warriors were the President's Trophy (later known as the Lester Patrick Cup) and Edinburgh Trophy champions. The team was also inducted into the Manitoba Hockey Hall of Fame in the team category and Jack Perrin was inducted in the Builder category. A number of the Warriors' players were also inducted over the years.

== NHL Alumni ==
- Gary Aldcorn
- Gary Bergman
- Garry Blaine
- Buddy Boone
- Dick Bouchard
- Gerry Brisson
- Fred Burchell
- Bill Burega
- Ed Chadwick
- Real Chevrefils
- Bob Chrystal
- Barry Cullen
- Brian Cullen
- Lorne Davis
- Kent Douglas
- Garry Edmundson
- Bill Folk
- Howie Glover
- Ted Green
- Pat Hannigan
- Cecil Hoekstra
- Howie Hughes
- Earl Ingarfield, Sr.
- Gerry James
- Bill Johansen
- Don Johns
- Al Johnson
- Eddie Johnston
- Bill Juzda
- Julian Klymkiw
- Gord Labossiere
- Bob Leiter
- Harry Lumley
- Paul Masnick
- Eddie Mazur
- Gerry McNamara
- Nick Mickoski
- Bill Mosienko
- Eric Nesterenko
- Al Nicholson
- Mike Nykoluk
- Cliff Pennington
- Jack Price
- Noel Price
- Gord Redahl
- Al Rollins
- Fred Shero
- Art Stratton
- Tom Thurlby
- Ernie Wakely
- Don Ward
- Steve Witiuk
