= Mickey Keating (athlete) =

Canadian ice hockey player and executive

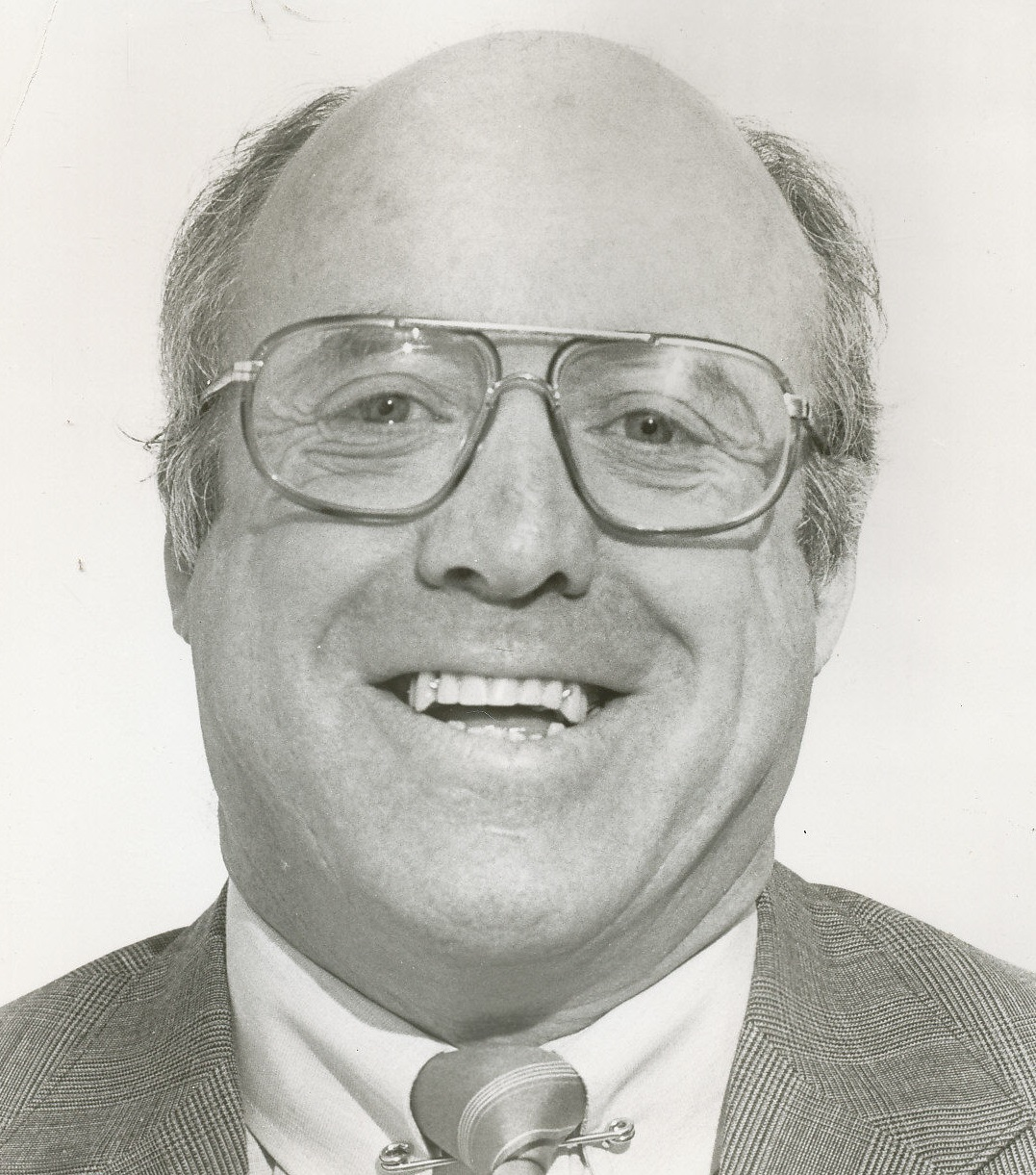
Keating in 1979

Mickey Keating (April 12, 1931 – January 19, 2004) was a Canadian professional ice hockey player and executive. While a player, he played the defenceman position. After his playing career, he became Coach and General Manager of the Flin Flon Bombers and was an Assistant General Manager with the New York Rangers. Keating was born in Winnipeg, Manitoba.

== Awards and achievements ==
- IHL Championships (1953, 1954, 1960, & 1961)
- WHL Championship (1956)
- Edinburgh Trophy Championship (1956)
- Honoured Member of the Manitoba Hockey Hall of Fame
