= Hockey Fights Cancer =

Charitable organization of the National Hockey League

- Formation: 1998; 28 years ago
- Type: Nonprofit organization
- Purpose: Cancer research
- Owner: National Hockey League
- Key people: Timm Harmon (founder)
- Website: Hockey Fights Cancer

Hockey Fights Cancer is a charitable initiative of the US and Canadian National Hockey League (NHL) and the National Hockey League Players' Association (NHLPA) dedicated to raising money and awareness toward cancer research. It was founded in 1998 as an outgrowth of a similar program instituted by the Tampa Bay Lightning after former player John Cullen made a brief NHL comeback after suffering from non-Hodgkin lymphoma. The program had raised over US$14 million according to its Web site in 2015.

== Founding ==
Tampa Bay Lightning forward John Cullen was leading his team in scoring late in the 1996–97 NHL season when he was forced out of the lineup after being diagnosed with non-Hodgkin lymphoma. He missed the remainder of that season and all of the following season as he suffered from the disease. Cullen attempted a comeback in 1998–99, but chose to retire after four NHL and three minor league games. In recognition of his comeback attempt, the NHL named him the 1999 winner of the Bill Masterton Memorial Trophy for dedication and perseverance.

Cullen's cancer inspired Timm Harmon of the Moffitt Cancer Centre at the University of South Florida to partner with the Lightning to raise awareness and money for cancer research. By December 1998, both the NHL and its union had joined themselves to the cause, creating the Hockey Fights Cancer initiative. Hockey Fights Cancer is also supported by the National Hockey League Officials Association, the league's professional trainers' association and media and business partners.

== Initiatives ==
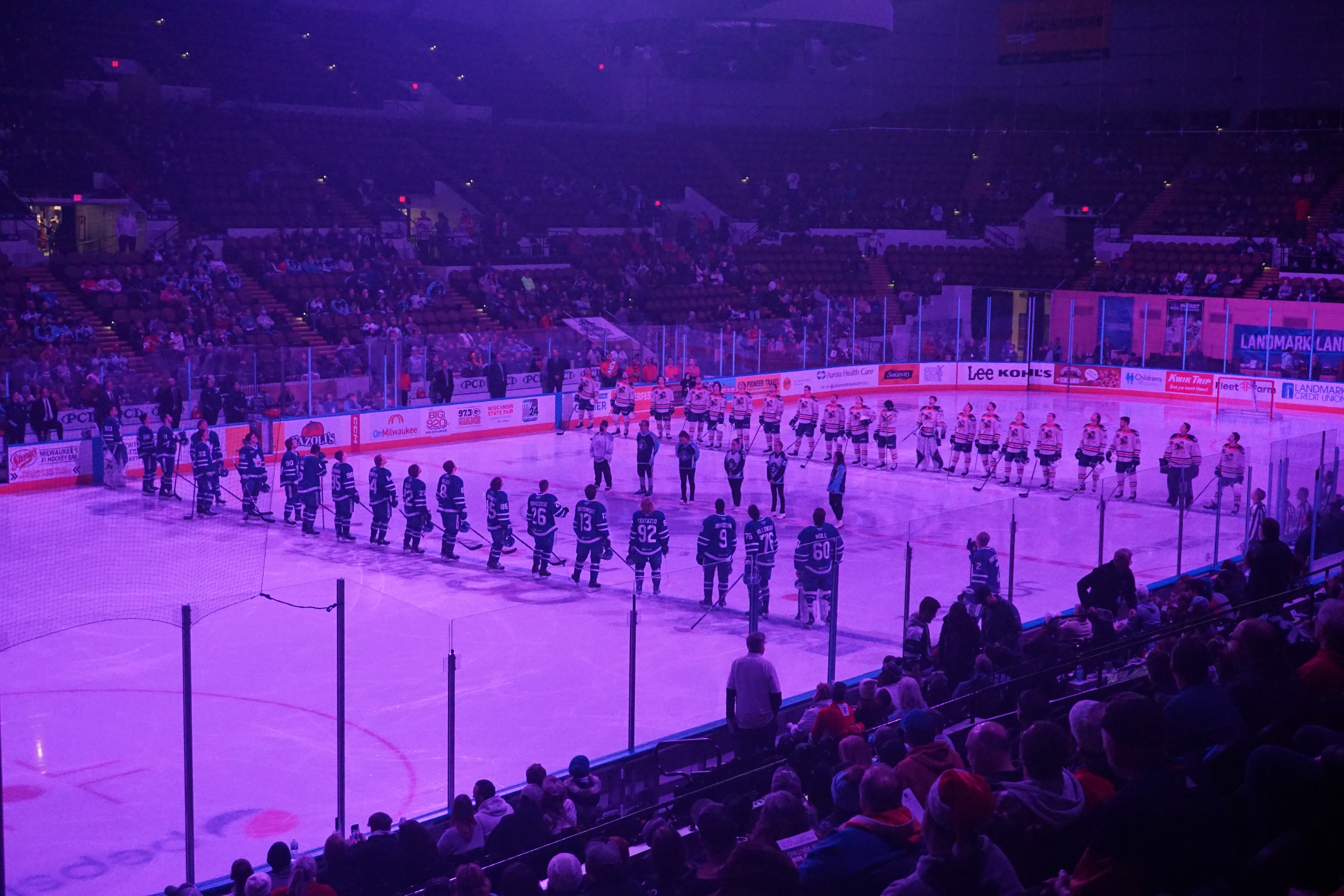
Hockey Fights Cancer night in Milwaukee, December 2022

Coinciding with Breast Cancer Awareness Month, Hockey Fights Cancer Month is held in October/November. During the month, players, teams, fans and corporate partners combine to raise money via a variety of means, including auctions of team branded and player autographed merchandise and equipment. Game-worn jerseys are popular at the auctions; Pittsburgh Penguins star Sidney Crosby's All-Star Game jersey sold for $47,520 in 2007, while that year's jersey auctions raised over $140,000 in total.

A Hockey Fights Cancer night in Pittsburgh on November 5, 2018 was especially memorable; cancer survivor Brian Boyle of the New Jersey Devils, who had been diagnosed with chronic myeloid leukemia in September 2017, scored his first NHL hat trick as the Devils defeated the Pittsburgh Penguins 5-1.

During the month, some players wear equipment specially painted purple to raise awareness for the initiative. In addition, each of the league's 32 teams designates at least one of their home games as "Hockey Fights Cancer Awareness Night/Day" to raise money. During these host games, the teams donate proceeds from 50/50 raffles, offer numerous promotions and donate tickets to hospitals and causes that support the fight against cancer. $1.1 million was raised in October 2010, bringing the charity's 13-year total to over $12 million.
