= St. Catharines Teepees =

Canadian junior ice hockey team (1947–1962)

- City: St. Catharines, Ontario
- League: Ontario Hockey Association
- Operated: 1947–1962
- Home arena: Garden City Arena

Franchise history
- 1943–1947: St. Catharines Falcons
- 1947–1962: St. Catharines Teepees
- 1962–1976: St. Catharines Black Hawks
- 1976–1982: Niagara Falls Flyers
- 1982–2002: North Bay Centennials
- 2002–present: Saginaw Spirit

Championships
- Playoff championships: 1954 Memorial Cup; 1960 Memorial Cup

The St. Catharines Teepees were a Canadian junior ice hockey team in the Ontario Hockey Association from 1947 to 1962. The team was based in St. Catharines, Ontario, and won the 1954 Memorial Cup and 1960 Memorial Cup as national champions.

== History ==
The St. Catharines Teepees were established in 1947, when George Stauffer, the president of Thompson Products, purchased the St. Catharines Falcons from Rudy Pilous, and named the team after the company's initials. Playing junior ice hockey in the Ontario Hockey Association (OHA), home games for the Teepees were at the Garden City Arena. The Teepees became a farm team for the Buffalo Bisons of the American Hockey League in 1950, when Pilous was named the team's general manager and signed defenceman Pierre Pilote.

In the 1953–54 OHA season, Pilous coached the Teepees to a J. Ross Robertson Cup, defeating the Toronto Marlboros in seven games for the OHA championship. Brian Cullen set OHA records that season, with 68 goals, 93 assists, and 161 points scored. In the Eastern Canada finals, the Teepees defeated the Quebec Frontenacs to win the George Richardson Memorial Trophy. The Teepees won the 1954 Memorial Cup played at Maple Leaf Gardens, defeating the Edmonton Oil Kings with four wins and a draw in five games.

In the 1959–60 OHA season, the Teepees were coached by Max Kaminsky and managed by Pilous. The Teepees defeated the Toronto St. Michael's Majors in a six-game series for the OHA championship. The Teepees won the first three games of the George Richardson Memorial Trophy series versus the Brockville Canadiens, then lost three and tied one game, before winning the series in an eighth game. The 1960 Memorial Cup was a rematch versus the Edmonton Oil Kings, with first game played at the Garden City Arena with remaining games played at Maple Leaf Gardens. The Teepees won their second Memorial Cup, by four games to two in a best-of-seven series.

The Teepees were renamed the St. Catharines Black Hawks following the 1961–62 OHA season, when the team was sold to new owners who retained the farm team agreement with the Chicago Black Hawks.

== Award winners ==
| Season | Player | Award(s) | Recognition | Source |
|---|---|---|---|---|
| 1953–54 | Brian Cullen | Eddie Powers Memorial Trophy | Scoring champion | |
| 1953–54 | Brian Cullen | Red Tilson Trophy | Most outstanding player | |
| 1954–55 | Hank Ciesla | Eddie Powers Memorial Trophy | Scoring champion | |
| 1954–55 | Hank Ciesla | Red Tilson Trophy | Most outstanding player | |
| 1957–58 | John McKenzie | Eddie Powers Memorial Trophy | Scoring champion | |
| 1958–59 | Stan Mikita | Eddie Powers Memorial Trophy | Scoring champion | |
| 1958–59 | Stan Mikita | Red Tilson Trophy | Most outstanding player | |
| 1959–60 | Chico Maki | Eddie Powers Memorial Trophy | Scoring champion | |

== Notable players ==
Four alumni of the Teepees were inducted into the Hockey Hall of Fame; including Phil Esposito (1961–1962), Bobby Hull (1955–1957), Stan Mikita (1956–1959), and Pierre Pilote (1950–1952).

List of Teepees who played in the National Hockey League or World Hockey Association:

- Buddy Boone
- John Brenneman
- Wayne Brown
- Gord Byers
- Hank Ciesla
- Norm Corcoran
- Roger Crozier
- Barry Cullen
- Brian Cullen
- Ray Cullen
- Ian Cushenan
- Norm Defelice
- Denis DeJordy
- Marv Edwards
- Roy Edwards
- Phil Esposito
- Gerry Foley
- Vic Hadfield
- Murray Hall
- Duke Harris
- Wayne Hillman
- Ken Hodge
- Cecil Hoekstra
- Ed Hoekstra
- Brent Hughes
- Bobby Hull
- Dennis Hull
- Doug Jarrett
- Chico Maki
- Frank Martin
- Larry Mavety
- Ab McDonald
- Jack McIntyre
- John McKenzie
- Stan Mikita
- Ellard O'Brien
- Pierre Pilote
- Dan Poliziani
- Poul Popiel
- Matt Ravlich
- Doug Robinson
- Len Ronson
- Ken Schinkel
- Don Simmons
- Bill Speer
- George Standing
- Fred Stanfield
- Jack Stanfield
- Pat Stapleton
- Art Stratton
- Red Sullivan
- Skip Teal
- Jerry Toppazzini
- Zellio Toppazzini
- Moose Vasko

== Season-by-season results ==
Regular season and playoffs results:

Legend: GP = Games played, W = Wins, L = Losses, T = Ties, Pts = Points, GF = Goals for, GA = Goals against

| Memorial Cup champions | League champions | League finalists |

| Season | Regular season | | | | | | | | | Playoffs |
| Season | GP | W | L | T | Pts | Pct | GF | GA | Finish | Playoffs |
|---|---|---|---|---|---|---|---|---|---|---|
| 1947–48 | 36 | 19 | 17 | 0 | 38 | 0.528 | 137 | 155 | 6th OHA | Lost quarterfinal (Galt Rockets) 2–1 |
| 1948–49 | 48 | 25 | 20 | 3 | 53 | 0.552 | 191 | 198 | 4th OHA | Won quarterfinal (Oshawa Generals) 2–0; Lost semifinal (Toronto Marlboros) 3–0 |
| 1949–50 | 48 | 27 | 17 | 4 | 58 | 0.604 | 269 | 211 | 3rd OHA | Lost quarterfinal (Guelph Biltmores) 3–2 |
| 1950–51 | 54 | 23 | 24 | 7 | 53 | 0.491 | 200 | 192 | 6th OHA | Won quarterfinal (Guelph Biltmores) 3–2; Lost semifinal (Toronto Marlboros) 3–1 |
| 1951–52 | 54 | 30 | 23 | 1 | 61 | 0.565 | 249 | 229 | 5th OHA | Won quarterfinal (Kitchener Greenshirts) 3–1; Won semifinal (Toronto St. Michael's Majors) 3–2; Lost OHA final (Guelph Biltmores) 4–1 |
| 1952–53 | 56 | 31 | 20 | 5 | 67 | 0.598 | 219 | 234 | 4th OHA | Lost quarterfinal (Toronto St. Michael's Majors) 3–0 |
| 1953–54 | 59 | 42 | 15 | 2 | 86 | 0.729 | 308 | 211 | 1st OHA | Won semifinal (Toronto St. Michael's Majors) 4–3–1; Won OHA final (Toronto Marlboros) 4–3; Won Eastern Canada championship final (Quebec Frontenacs) 4–2; Won 1954 Memorial Cup final (Edmonton Oil Kings) 4–0–1 |
| 1954–55 | 49 | 32 | 15 | 2 | 66 | 0.673 | 260 | 176 | 1st OHA | Won semifinal (Toronto St. Michael's Majors) 4–0–1; Lost OHA final (Toronto Marlboros) 4–2 |
| 1955–56 | 48 | 28 | 17 | 3 | 59 | 0.615 | 219 | 197 | 1st OHA | Lost semifinal (Toronto Marlboros) 4–1–1 |
| 1956–57 | 52 | 25 | 25 | 2 | 52 | 0.500 | 184 | 193 | 3rd OHA | Won quarterfinal (Barrie Flyers) 3–0; Won semifinal (Toronto Marlboros) 3–2; Lost OHA final (Guelph Biltmores) 4–2 |
| 1957–58 | 52 | 32 | 14 | 6 | 70 | 0.673 | 246 | 174 | 1st OHA | Lost semifinal (Toronto Marlboros) 4–3 |
| 1958–59 | 54 | 40 | 11 | 3 | 83 | 0.769 | 257 | 175 | 1st OHA | Lost semifinal (Toronto St. Michael's Majors) 4–2–1 |
| 1959–60 | 48 | 25 | 19 | 4 | 54 | 0.562 | 209 | 191 | 2nd OHA | Won quarterfinal (Guelph Biltmores) 4–1; Won semifinal (Peterborough Petes) 4–1–1; Won OHA final (Toronto St. Michael's Majors) 3–1–2; Won Eastern Canada championship final (Brockville Canadiens) 4–3–1; Won 1960 Memorial Cup final (Edmonton Oil Kings) 4–2 |
| 1960–61 | 48 | 18 | 24 | 6 | 42 | 0.438 | 167 | 204 | 5th OHA | Lost quarterfinal (Toronto St. Michael's Majors) 4–2 |
| 1961–62 | 50 | 19 | 23 | 8 | 46 | 0.460 | 194 | 206 | 3rd OHA | Lost semifinal (Hamilton Red Wings) 4–1–1 |

== Sources ==
- Lapp, Richard M.; Macaulay, Alec (1997). The Memorial Cup: Canada's National Junior Hockey Championship. Madeira Park, British Columbia: Harbour Publishing. ISBN 1-55017-170-4.
- Gregoire, L. Waxy; Dupuis, David; Pilote, Pierre (2013). "Flight of the Teepee". Heart of the Blackhawks: The Pierre Pilote Story. Toronto, Ontario: ECW Press. ISBN 9781770411364 – via Google Books.
