= Hank Ciesla =

Canadian ice hockey player

- Born: October 15, 1934 St. Catharines, Ontario, Canada
- Died: April 22, 1976 (aged 41)
- Height: 6 ft 2 in (188 cm)
- Weight: 190 lb (86 kg; 13 st 8 lb)
- Position: Centre
- Shot: Left
- Played for: Chicago Black Hawks; New York Rangers
- Playing career: 1955–1965

Henry Edward "Hank" Ciesla (October 15, 1934 in St. Catharines, Ontario – April 22, 1976) was a Canadian professional ice hockey forward who played 269 games in the National Hockey League. He played for the Chicago Black Hawks and New York Rangers.

== Transfer History ==
• September, 1955: Rights traded to Chicago by Buffalo (AHL) for $15,000 with Montreal receiving Bob Duncan (Toronto/OHA-Jr.) and Toronto receiving Gary Collins (Kitchener/OHA-Jr).

• June, 1957: Traded to NY Rangers by Chicago for Ron Murphy.

• October 3, 1959: Traded to Toronto by NY Rangers with Bill Kennedy and future considerations for Noel Price.

• August, 1961: Traded to Cleveland (AHL) by Toronto (Rochester-AHL) for Bill Dineen and cash.

• June 4, 1963: Claimed by Detroit (Pittsburgh-AHL) from Cleveland (AHL) in Inter-League Draft.

• October 10, 1964: Traded to Chicago (Buffalo-AHL) by Detroit (Pittsburgh-AHL) for Jerry Toppazzini.

== Career statistics ==
| | | | Regular season | | | | | Playoffs |
| Season | Team | League | GP | G | A | Pts | PIM | GP | G | A | Pts | PIM |
|---|---|---|---|---|---|---|---|---|---|---|---|---|
| 1950–51 | St. Catharines Teepees | OHA-Jr. | 1 | 0 | 1 | 1 | 0 | 1 | 0 | 0 | 0 | 0 |
| 1951–52 | St. Catharines Teepees | OHA-Jr. | 41 | 14 | 25 | 39 | 27 | 14 | 5 | 7 | 12 | 14 |
| 1952–53 | St. Catharines Teepees | OHA-Jr. | 56 | 19 | 24 | 43 | 43 | 1 | 0 | 0 | 0 | 0 |
| 1953–54 | St. Catharines Teepees | OHA-Jr. | 59 | 39 | 30 | 69 | 66 | 15 | 6 | 7 | 13 | 8 |
| 1953–54 | St. Catharines Teepees | MC | — | — | — | — | — | 11 | 5 | 8 | 13 | 29 |
| 1954–55 | St. Catharines Teepees | OHA-Jr. | 45 | 57 | 49 | 106 | 36 | 11 | 7 | 8 | 15 | 23 |
| 1955–56 | Chicago Black Hawks | NHL | 70 | 8 | 23 | 31 | 22 | — | — | — | — | — |
| 1956–57 | Chicago Black Hawks | NHL | 70 | 10 | 8 | 18 | 28 | — | — | — | — | — |
| 1957–58 | New York Rangers | NHL | 60 | 2 | 6 | 8 | 16 | 6 | 0 | 2 | 2 | 0 |
| 1958–59 | New York Rangers | NHL | 69 | 6 | 14 | 20 | 21 | — | — | — | — | — |
| 1959–60 | Rochester Americans | AHL | 64 | 27 | 44 | 71 | 31 | 11 | 3 | 7 | 10 | 14 |
| 1960–61 | Rochester Americans | AHL | 70 | 30 | 44 | 74 | 23 | — | — | — | — | — |
| 1961–62 | Cleveland Barons | AHL | 70 | 25 | 38 | 63 | 22 | 6 | 4 | 3 | 7 | 6 |
| 1962–63 | Cleveland Barons | AHL | 72 | 42 | 56 | 98 | 41 | 7 | 3 | 8 | 11 | 8 |
| 1963–64 | Pittsburgh Hornets | AHL | 69 | 18 | 38 | 56 | 46 | 5 | 1 | 3 | 4 | 8 |
| 1964–65 | Buffalo Bisons | AHL | 49 | 8 | 8 | 16 | 34 | — | — | — | — | — |
| NHL totals | | | 269 | 26 | 51 | 77 | 87 | 6 | 0 | 2 | 2 | 0 |
| AHL totals | | | 394 | 150 | 228 | 378 | 197 | 29 | 11 | 21 | 32 | 36 |
