= Chico Maki =

Canadian ice hockey player

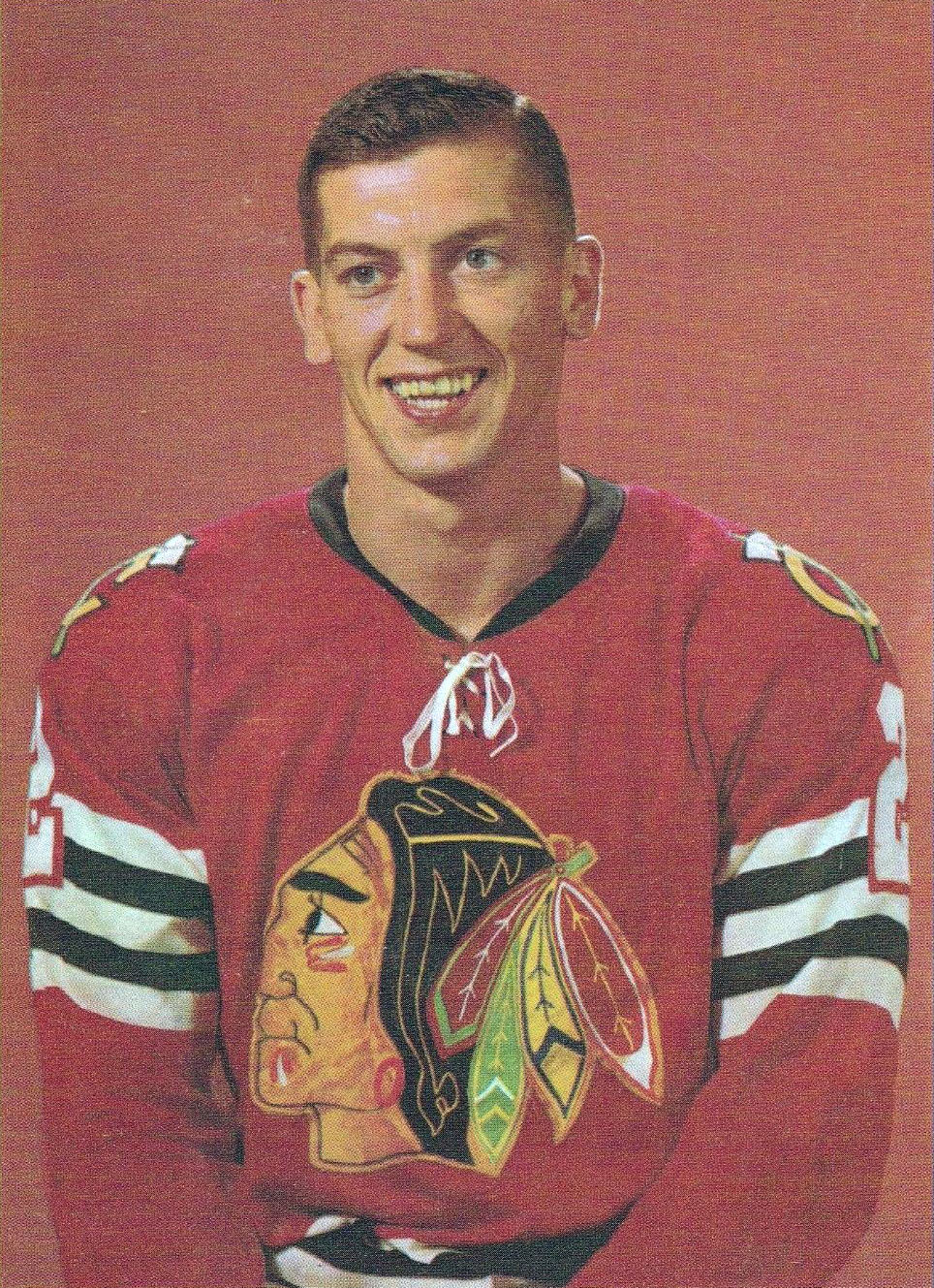
- Born: August 17, 1939 Sault Ste. Marie, Ontario, Canada
- Died: August 25, 2015 (aged 76) Port Dover, Ontario, Canada
- Height: 6 ft 1 in (185 cm)
- Weight: 180 lb (82 kg; 12 st 12 lb)
- Position: Right wing
- Shot: Right
- Played for: Chicago Black Hawks
- Playing career: 1960–1976

Ronald Patrick "Chico" Maki (August 17, 1939 – August 24, 2015) was a Canadian ice hockey forward. Maki played his entire National Hockey League (NHL) career with the Chicago Black Hawks, starting in the 1960–61 NHL season, and retiring after the 1975–76 season.

== Playing career ==
Maki played junior hockey with the St. Catharines Teepees, and was team captain when they won the 1960 Memorial Cup. He won the Dudley "Red" Garrett Memorial Award as American Hockey League (AHL) rookie of the year while playing for the Buffalo Bisons in 1961. Maki then dressed for games one and two of the 1961 Stanley Cup Final, but did not play; Chicago still included his name on the Stanley Cup when they won it that year.

Maki became known as a skilled two-way forward, perennially in the league leaders in shorthanded goals, and played in three All-Star Games: in 1961, 1971 and 1972.

== Personal life ==
He was the older brother of former NHL player Wayne Maki, who died of brain cancer in 1974. Maki also bought the Hillcrest Restaurant and Motel, which he later called Chico Maki's Inn. He was of Finnish descent.

== Career statistics ==
			Regular season					Playoffs
Season	Team	League	GP	G	A	Pts	PIM	GP	G	A	Pts	PIM
1956–57	St. Catharines Teepees	OHA-Jr.	47	6	6	12	32	14	2	1	3	32
1957–58	St. Catharines Teepees	OHA-Jr.	49	21	19	40	72	8	3	5	8	10
1958–59	St. Catharines Teepees	OHA-Jr.	54	41	53	94	64	7	2	1	3	10
1958–59	Buffalo Bisons	AHL	1	0	0	0	2	—	—	—	—	—
1958–59	Trois-Rivières Lions	QHL	—	—	—	—	—	1	0	0	0	0
1959–60	St. Catharines Teepees	OHA-Jr.	47	39	53	92	75	17	11	18	29	40
1959–60	Sault Ste. Marie Thunderbirds	EPHL	1	0	1	1	0	—	—	—	—	—
1959–60	Buffalo Bisons	AHL	3	1	4	5	0	—	—	—	—	—
1959–60	St. Catharines Teepees	M-Cup	—	—	—	—	—	14	8	19	27	41
1960–61	Buffalo Bisons	AHL	69	30	42	72	20	4	0	0	0	2
1960–61	Chicago Black Hawks	NHL	—	—	—	—	—	1	0	0	0	0
1961–62	Chicago Black Hawks	NHL	16	4	6	10	2	—	—	—	—	—
1961–62	Buffalo Bisons	AHL	51	21	28	49	65	11	3	5	8	15
1962–63	Chicago Black Hawks	NHL	65	7	17	24	35	6	0	1	1	2
1963–64	Chicago Black Hawks	NHL	68	8	14	22	70	7	0	0	0	15
1964–65	Chicago Black Hawks	NHL	65	16	24	40	58	14	3	9	12	8
1965–66	Chicago Black Hawks	NHL	68	17	31	48	41	3	1	1	2	0
1966–67	Chicago Black Hawks	NHL	56	9	29	38	14	6	0	0	0	0
1967–68	Chicago Black Hawks	NHL	60	8	16	24	4	11	2	5	7	4
1968–69	Chicago Black Hawks	NHL	66	7	21	28	30	—	—	—	—	—
1969–70	Chicago Black Hawks	NHL	75	10	24	34	27	8	2	2	4	2
1970–71	Chicago Black Hawks	NHL	72	22	26	48	18	18	6	5	11	6
1971–72	Chicago Black Hawks	NHL	62	13	34	47	22	8	1	4	5	4
1972–73	Chicago Black Hawks	NHL	77	13	19	32	10	16	2	8	10	0
1973–74	Chicago Black Hawks	NHL	69	9	25	34	12	11	0	1	1	2
1975–76	Chicago Black Hawks	NHL	22	0	6	6	2	4	0	0	0	0
NHL totals			841	143	292	435	345	113	17	36	53	43
