= 1954 Memorial Cup =

Canadian junior ice hockey championship

The Memorial Cup trophy

The 1954 Memorial Cup final was the 36th junior ice hockey championship of the Canadian Amateur Hockey Association. The George Richardson Memorial Trophy champions St. Catharines Teepees of the Ontario Hockey Association in Eastern Canada competed against the Abbott Cup champions Edmonton Oil Kings of the Western Canada Junior Hockey League in Western Canada. In a best-of-seven series, held at Maple Leaf Gardens in Toronto, Ontario, St. Catharines won their 1st Memorial Cup, defeating Edmonton 4 games to 0 with 1 tie.

== Scores ==
- Game 1: Sunday May 9, St. Catharines 8-2 Edmonton
- Game 2: Tuesday May 11, St. Catharines 5-3 Edmonton
- Game 3: Thursday May 13, St. Catharines 4-1 Edmonton
- Game 4: Saturday May 15, Edmonton 3-3 St. Catharines
- Game 5: Sunday May 16, St. Catharines 6-2 Edmonton

== Winning roster ==
Jack Armstrong, Hugh Barlow, Hank Ciesla, Barry Cullen, Brian Cullen, Nelson Bulloch, Ian Cushanen, Marv Edwards, Jack Higgins, Cecil Hoekstra, Pete Koval, Bob Maxwell, Don McLean, Wimpy Roberts, Reg Truax, Elmer Vasko, Chester Warchol. Coach: Rudy Pilous
