= Ray Cullen =

Canadian ice hockey player (1941–2021)

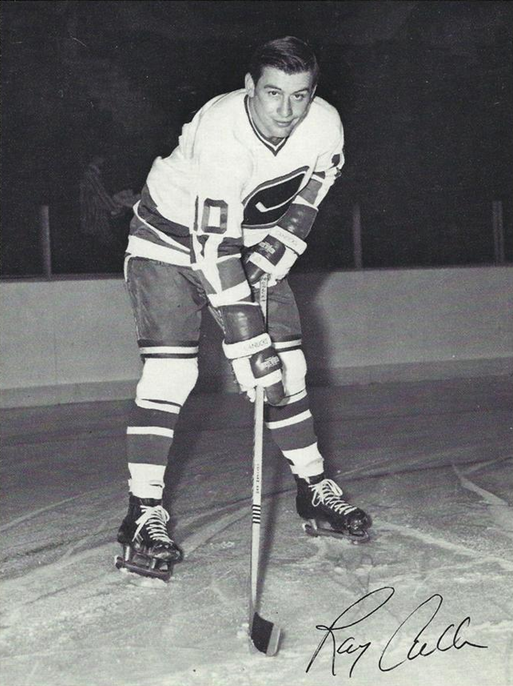
- Cullen in 1970 photo
- Born: September 20, 1941 St. Catharines, Ontario, Canada
- Died: March 14, 2021 (aged 79) London, Ontario, Canada
- Height: 5 ft 11 in (180 cm)
- Weight: 178 lb (81 kg; 12 st 10 lb)
- Position: Centre
- Shot: Right
- Played for: New York Rangers; Detroit Red Wings; Minnesota North Stars; Vancouver Canucks
- Playing career: 1965–1971

Raymond Murray Cullen (September 20, 1941 – March 14, 2021) was a Canadian professional ice hockey centre who played six seasons in the National Hockey League (NHL). He played for the Detroit Red Wings, New York Rangers, Minnesota North Stars and Vancouver Canucks. Cullen scored in the first North Stars home game and also in the first North Stars home playoff game. As of 2026, Cullen is one of just four players in the expansion era to score a goal in the first home game of an expansion team in the regular season and the playoffs.

Prior to joining the NHL, Cullen played several seasons in different minor leagues, being named to the First All-Star Team in his only seasons in both the EHL and CPHL, as well as being named the EHL rookie of the year. He also was the winner of the Dudley "Red" Garrett Memorial Award as the rookie of the year in the American Hockey League in 1964–65. Ray's older brothers, Brian and Barry, also played in the NHL.

Born in St. Catharines, Ontario, Cullen was the owner of Ray Cullen Chevrolet Buick GMC dealership in London, Ontario. He died on March 14, 2021, at the age of 79.

== Career statistics ==
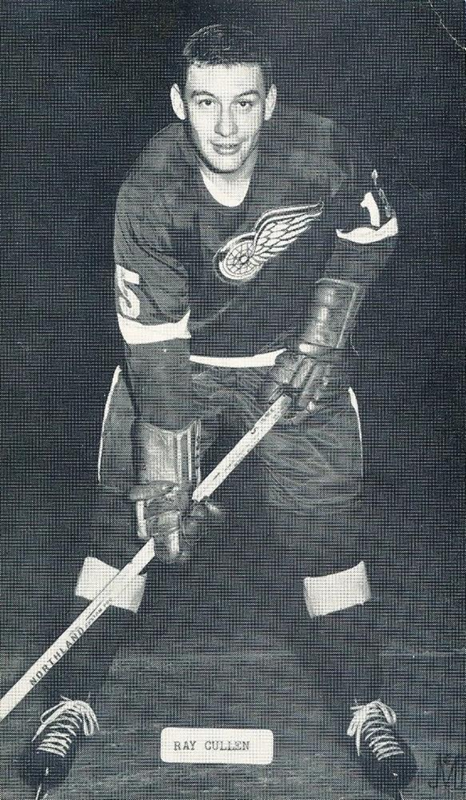
1966-67 postcard of Cullen for Detroit Red Wings

=== Regular season and playoffs ===
| | | | Regular season | | | | | Playoffs |
| Season | Team | League | GP | G | A | Pts | PIM | GP | G | A | Pts | PIM |
|---|---|---|---|---|---|---|---|---|---|---|---|---|
| 1958–59 | St. Catharines Teepees | OHA | 54 | 19 | 14 | 33 | 46 | 7 | 1 | 1 | 2 | 0 |
| 1959–60 | St. Catharines Teepees | OHA | 48 | 48 | 29 | 77 | 60 | 17 | 15 | 17 | 32 | 20 |
| 1960–61 | St. Catharines Teepees | OHA | 45 | 24 | 50 | 74 | 56 | 6 | 2 | 2 | 4 | 10 |
| 1961–62 | St. Catherines Teepees | OHA | 50 | 36 | 42 | 78 | 63 | 6 | 4 | 2 | 6 | 0 |
| 1962–63 | Knoxville Knights | EHL | 67 | 66 | 43 | 109 | 32 | 5 | 4 | 1 | 5 | 0 |
| 1963–64 | St. Louis Braves | CPHL | 63 | 46 | 52 | 98 | 24 | — | — | — | — | — |
| 1964–65 | Buffalo Bisons | AHL | 70 | 28 | 36 | 64 | 18 | 9 | 3 | 6 | 9 | 17 |
| 1965–66 | New York Rangers | NHL | 8 | 1 | 3 | 4 | 0 | — | — | — | — | — |
| 1965–66 | Baltimore Clippers | AHL | 63 | 27 | 46 | 73 | 40 | — | — | — | — | — |
| 1966–67 | Detroit Red Wings | NHL | 27 | 8 | 8 | 16 | 8 | — | — | — | — | — |
| 1966–67 | Pittsburgh Hornets | AHL | 28 | 15 | 14 | 29 | 8 | — | — | — | — | — |
| 1967–68 | Minnesota North Stars | NHL | 67 | 28 | 25 | 53 | 18 | 14 | 2 | 6 | 8 | 2 |
| 1968–69 | Minnesota North Stars | NHL | 67 | 26 | 38 | 64 | 44 | — | — | — | — | — |
| 1969–70 | Minnesota North Stars | NHL | 74 | 17 | 28 | 45 | 8 | 6 | 1 | 4 | 5 | 0 |
| 1970–71 | Vancouver Canucks | NHL | 70 | 12 | 21 | 33 | 42 | — | — | — | — | — |
| NHL totals | | | 313 | 92 | 123 | 215 | 120 | 20 | 3 | 10 | 13 | 2 |

== Awards ==
=== EHL ===
| Award | Year(s) |
|---|---|
| EHL First All-Star Team | 1962–63 |
| EHL Rookie of the Year | 1962–63 |

=== CPHL ===
| Award | Year(s) |
|---|---|
| CPHL First All-Star Team | 1963–64 |

=== AHL ===
| Award | Year(s) |
|---|---|
| Dudley "Red" Garrett Memorial Award | 1964–65 |

== See also ==
- List of family relations in the NHL
