= Edinburgh Trophy =

The Edinburgh Trophy was a trophy given to the winners of a series played between the champions of the Western Hockey League and the Quebec Hockey League professional ice hockey leagues. It was contested in the years 1954 to 1957.

== Donation ==
The trophy was donated by the Prince Philip, Duke of Edinburgh in March 1954. It was described as a "silver figure of a hockey player mounted on top of a silver globe with a map of North America raised on it." The globe was attached to a black ebony base with the coat of arms of the Dominion of Canada. On the sides of the base, there were small plaques to inscribe the winning team's name. The winners were to be considered the "World's Minor Professional Champions".

At the same time, the terms of the championship were announced. The two leagues would play off annually, alternating in the east and the west. The first playoff would be held in the city of the champion of the Western Hockey League.

== Series record ==
All contested series were best-of-nine format.

| Year | Winner | Runner-up | Result |
|---|---|---|---|
| 1954 | Calgary Stampeders | Quebec Aces | 5–1 |
| 1955 | Shawinigan-Falls Cataracts | Edmonton Flyers | 5–2 |
| 1956 | Winnipeg Warriors | Montreal Royals | 5–1 |
| 1957 | Quebec Aces | Brandon Regals | 5–1 |
