= 1955–56 WHL season =

- League: Western Hockey League
- Sport: Ice hockey
- Games: 70
- Teams: 9

Regular season

President's Cup
- Champions: Winnipeg Warriors
- Runners-up: Vancouver Canucks

Seasons
- 1954–55 1956–57

The 1955–56 WHL season was the fourth season of the Western Hockey League. The Winnipeg Warriors were the President's Cup champions as they beat the Vancouver Canucks in six games in the final series.

Three new teams joined the league: the Seattle Totems, Winnipeg Warriors, and Regina Regals. However due to low attendance the Regals moved to Brandon, Manitoba after 11 games and finished the season there.

== Teams ==
1955–56 Western Hockey League
Division	Team	City	Arena	Capacity
Coast	New Westminster Royals	New Westminster, British Columbia	Queen's Park Arena	3,500
Coast	Seattle Totems	Seattle, Washington	Civic Ice Arena	5,000
Coast	Vancouver Canucks	Vancouver, British Columbia	PNE Forum	5,050
Coast	Victoria Cougars	Victoria, British Columbia	Victoria Memorial Arena	5,000
Prairie	Regina/Brandon Regals	Regina, Saskatchewan; Brandon, Manitoba	Queen City Gardens; Wheat City Arena	5,000; 5,100
Prairie	Calgary Stampeders	Calgary, Alberta	Stampede Corral	6,475
Prairie	Edmonton Flyers	Edmonton, Alberta	Edmonton Stock Pavilion	6,000
Prairie	Saskatoon Quakers	Saskatoon, Saskatchewan	Saskatoon Arena	3,304
Prairie	Winnipeg Warriors	Winnipeg, Manitoba	Winnipeg Arena	9,500

=== Map of teams ===
Coast Division Teams Prairie Division Teams

== Final standings ==
Coast Division Standings
R	Team	GP	W	L	T	GF	GA	Pts
**1**	**Vancouver Canucks**	**70**	**38**	**28**	**4**	**252**	**181**	**80**
**2**	**Victoria Cougars**	**70**	**35**	**30**	**5**	**206**	**196**	**75**
**3**	**New Westminster Royals**	**70**	**31**	**37**	**2**	**238**	**258**	**64**
4	Seattle Totems	70	31	37	2	201	243	64

Prairie Division Standings
R	Team	GP	W	L	T	GF	GA	Pts
**1**	**Winnipeg Warriors**	**70**	**40**	**28**	**2**	**248**	**212**	**82**
**2**	**Calgary Stampeders**	**70**	**40**	**30**	**0**	**292**	**242**	**80**
**3**	**Saskatoon Quakers**	**70**	**27**	**35**	**8**	**208**	**249**	**62**
**4**	**Edmonton Flyers**	**70**	**33**	**34**	**3**	**236**	**256**	**56**
5	Regina/Brandon Regals	70	23	39	8	199	243	54

bold - qualified for playoffs

== Playoffs ==
The Winnipeg Warriors win the President's Cup 4 games to 2.

== Bibliography ==
- Stott, Jon C. (2008), Ice Warriors: The Pacific Coast/Western Hockey League 1948–1974, Surrey, British Columbia: Heritage House Publishing, ISBN 978-1-894974-54-7
