= 1967–68 Philadelphia Flyers season =

NHL hockey team season (inaugural season)

1967–68 Philadelphia Flyers
- West Division champions
- Division: 1st West
- 1967–68 record: 31–32–11
- Home record: 17–13–7
- Road record: 14–19–4
- Goals for: 173 (11th)
- Goals against: 179 (3rd)

Team information
- General manager: Bud Poile
- Coach: Keith Allen
- Captain: Lou Angotti
- Alternate captains: Bill Sutherland; Ed Van Impe
- Arena: Spectrum (Note: After a March 1 storm blew parts of the Spectrum's roof off, the Flyers played their final seven regular season home games at neutral-site locations. After playing their next two home games at Madison Square Garden and Maple Leaf Gardens, they played their final five home games at Le Colisee in Quebec City, the home arena of their AHL affiliate.)
- Average attendance: 9,625
- Minor league affiliates: Quebec Aces; Seattle Totems; Phoenix Roadrunners; Knoxville Knights

Team leaders
- Goals: Leon Rochefort (21)
- Assists: Lou Angotti (37)
- Points: Lou Angotti (49)
- Penalty minutes: Ed Van Impe (141)
- Plus/minus: Joe Watson (+12); Larry Zeidel (+12)
- Wins: Doug Favell (16)
- Goals against average: Doug Favell (2.27)

The 1967–68 Philadelphia Flyers season was the franchise's inaugural season in the National Hockey League (NHL), and the first for a team based in Philadelphia since the Philadelphia Quakers in 1930–31. The Flyers won the West Division, but lost in the first round of the playoffs to the St. Louis Blues in seven games.

== NHL expansion ==
Philadelphia waited almost 35 years from when the Quakers' played their last home game (a 4–0 loss to Chicago on March 17, 1931) for the NHL to return when the city was awarded an expansion franchise on February 9, 1966. Philadelphia was a bit of a surprise choice since a group from the nearby city of Baltimore were considered favorites to land a team.

The man who often receives the most credit for bringing NHL hockey back to Philadelphia is Ed Snider. While attending a basketball game in 1964 at the Boston Garden, the then vice-president of the Philadelphia Eagles observed a crowd of Boston Bruins fans lining up to purchase tickets to see a last-place team. Intrigued, he began making plans for a new arena upon hearing the NHL was looking to expand due to fears of a competing league taking hold on the West Coast and the desire for a new television contract in the United States. Snider made his proposal to the league and the Philadelphia group – including Snider, Bill Putnam, Jerome Schiff, and Eagles owner Jerry Wolman – was chosen over the Baltimore group.

On April 4, 1966, Putnam announced there would be a name-the-team contest and that orange, black and white would be the team colors. Wanting what he referred to as "hot" colors, Putnam's choice was influenced by the orange and white of his alma mater, the University of Texas, and the orange and black of Philadelphia's previous NHL team, the Quakers. Also announced on April 4 was the hiring of a Chicago firm to design the team's arena.

Details of the name-the-team contest were released on July 12, 1966. As sponsor of the contest, ballots were available at local Acme Markets grocery stores and included a top prize of a RCA 21" color television, two season tickets for both the second and third prize winners, and a pair of tickets to a game for the next 100 winners. Among the names considered behind the scenes were Quakers, Ramblers, and Liberty Bells. The first two were the names of previous Philadelphia hockey teams and given the connotations of losing (Quakers) and the minor leagues (Ramblers), were passed over. Liberty Bells, though seriously considered, was also the name of a local race track. Bashers, Blizzards, Bruisers, Huskies, Keystones, Knights, Lancers, Raiders, and Sabres were among the other names considered.

The flying P has been the Flyers' primary logo since the beginning.

It was Ed Snider's sister Phyllis who ended up naming the team when she suggested Flyers on a return trip from a Broadway play. Ed knew immediately it would be the winning name, since it captured the speed of the game and went well phonetically with Philadelphia. On August 3, 1966, the team name was announced. Of the 11,000 ballots received, more than 100 selected Flyers as the team name and were entered into a drawing to select a winner. 9-year-old boy Alec Stockard from Narberth, who had spelled it "Fliers" on his entry, won the drawing and was declared the winner.

With the name and colors already known, Philadelphia advertising firm Mel Richmann Inc. was hired to design a logo and jersey. With Tom Paul as head of the project, artist Sam Ciccone designed both the logo and jerseys with the concept to represent speed. Ciccone's winged P design, four stylized wings attached to a slanted P with an orange dot to represent a puck, was considered the "obvious choice" over his other designs which included a winged skate. Ciccone's jersey design, a stripe down each shoulder and down the arms, represented wings.

== Off-season ==
The men hired to build the expansion Flyers were Bud Poile as general manager and Keith Allen as head coach. Both were former NHL players and were Western Hockey League coaches in the years preceding expansion, Poile with the San Francisco Seals and Allen with the Seattle Totems. On May 8, 1967, the Flyers purchased the American Hockey League's Quebec Aces and with them acquired sixteen professional players and the rights to sixteen amateur players. The NHL expansion draft was held a month later on June 6. The six expansion franchises selected 20 players from the Original Six teams, though most of the players available were either aging veterans or career minor-leaguers before expansion occurred. Among the Flyers' 20 selections were Bernie Parent, Doug Favell, Ed Van Impe, Joe Watson, Lou Angotti (who was named the Flyers' first captain), Leon Rochefort, and Gary Dornhoefer. The following day, the Flyers made two selections in the 1967 NHL amateur draft, notably Serge Bernier fifth overall from the Sorel Eperviers.

== Regular season ==
The Flyers made their debut on October 11, 1967, losing 5–1 on the road to the California Seals. Bill Sutherland scored the first goal in franchise history. They won their first game a week later, defeating the St. Louis Blues on the road, 2–1. The Flyers made their home debut in front of a crowd of 7,812, shutting out their trans-Pennsylvania rivals, the Pittsburgh Penguins, 1–0 on October 19. With all six expansion teams grouped into the same division, the Flyers were able to win the division with a below .500 record and after being forced to play their last seven home games on the road (five of them at Le Colisee in Quebec City, the home of their AHL affiliate) due to a March 1 storm blowing parts of the Spectrum's roof off. The March 7 game against Boston, relocated to Toronto, featured a bloody stick-swinging duel between the Flyers' Larry Zeidel and the Bruins' Eddie Shack, resulting in suspensions for both players.

The team was led offensively by Leon Rochefort in goals (21) and Lou Angotti in assists (37) and points (49). Bill Sutherland was the only other player on the team with at least 20 goals and Gary Dornhoefer was the only other player with at least 30 assists. Rochefort was the only Flyer to take part in the NHL All-Star Game. Despite the lack of offensive firepower, the Flyers were strong enough defensively to be a respectable 8–15–1 against Original Six teams, winning at least one game against all six and winning three of their four games against the defending Stanley Cup champion Toronto Maple Leafs. 22-year-old goaltenders Doug Favell and Bernie Parent split time in net and put up similar numbers. Favell finished third in Calder Memorial Trophy voting.

=== Season standings ===
West Division
		GP	W	L	T	GF	GA	DIFF	Pts
1	Philadelphia Flyers	74	31	32	11	173	179	−6	73
2	Los Angeles Kings	74	31	33	10	200	224	−24	72
3	St. Louis Blues	74	27	31	16	177	191	−14	70
4	Minnesota North Stars	74	27	32	15	191	226	−35	69
5	Pittsburgh Penguins	74	27	34	13	195	216	−21	67
6	Oakland Seals	74	15	42	17	153	219	−66	47

=== Record vs. opponents ===
==== Vs. West Division ====
1967–68 NHL records
Team	LAK	MIN	OAK	PHI	PIT	STL	Total
Los Angeles	—	2–6–2	4–4–2	5–4–1	6–4	4–3–3	21–21–8
Minnesota	6–2–2	—	5–2–3	3–6–1	3–4–3	3–5–2	20–19–11
Oakland	4–4–2	2–5–3	—	4–3–3	1–5–4	0–7–3	11–24–15
Philadelphia	4–5–1	6–3–1	3–4–3	—	3–4–3	7–1–2	23–17–10
Pittsburgh	4–6	4–3–3	5–1–4	4–3–3	—	4–6	21–19–10
St. Louis	3–4–3	5–3–2	7–0–3	1–7–2	6–4	—	22–18–10

==== Vs. East Division ====
1967–68 NHL records
Team	BOS	CHI	DET	MTL	NYR	TOR	Total
Los Angeles	1–3	1–2–1	2–1–1	2–2	2–2	2–2	10–12–2
Minnesota	2–2	1–3	2–2	1–2–1	0–2–2	1–2–1	7–13–4
Oakland	2–2	0–3–1	0–3–1	1–3	0–4	1–3	4–18–2
Philadelphia	1–3	1–3	1–3	1–2–1	1–3	3–1	8–15–1
Pittsburgh	2–2	1–2–1	1–3	0–4	0–3–1	2–1–1	6–15–3
St. Louis	1–2–1	0–2–2	1–2–1	0–3–1	1–3	2–1–1	5–13–6

== Playoffs ==
The Flyers returned to the Spectrum in time to open up their first playoff series on April 4, 1968, against the St. Louis Blues. The Blues came into the series as underdogs, but they took game one 1–0. Pat Hannigan scored the Flyers first ever playoff goal 1:32 into the first period of game two. Tied going into the third period, Leon Rochefort's goal with 13:09 left proved to be the game winner in a 4–3 result. The series shifted to St. Louis and the Flyers lost both games three and four. With the Flyers on the verge of elimination, Rosaire Paiement scored a hat trick in game five and the Flyers won 6–1. Returning to St. Louis for game six, Don Blackburn's goal with 8:42 left in the second overtime forced a game seven. However, the Flyers lost game seven by a score of 3–1.

== Schedule and results ==
=== Preseason ===
1967 preseason
Preseason: 5–3–2

Game	Date	Score	Opponent	Record	Recap
1	September 17	1–6	@ Quebec Aces (AHL)	0–1–0	L
2	September 19	2–2	@ Quebec Aces (AHL)	0–1–1	T
3^{[a]}	September 21	5–4	Springfield Kings (AHL)	1–1–1	W
4^{[b]}	September 22	1–3	Los Angeles Kings	1–2–1	L
5^{[c]}	September 23	3–7	Pittsburgh Penguins	1–3–1	L
6	September 30	5–1	@ Hershey Bears (AHL)	2–3–1	W
7^{[d]}	October 3	4–4	Minnesota North Stars	2–3–2	T
8^{[e]}	October 4	5–3	Quebec Aces (AHL)	3–3–2	W
9	October 6	3–1	@ Quebec Aces (AHL)	4–3–2	W
10	October 8	4–3	@ Providence Reds (AHL)	5–3–2	W
Notes:^{a} Game played in Hamilton, Ontario.^{b} Game played in Guelph, Ontario.^{c} Game played in Brantford, Ontario.^{d} Game played in Kingston, Ontario.^{e} Game played in Sorel, Quebec.

Legend: W Win (2 points) L Loss (0 points) T Tie (1 point)

=== Regular season ===
1967–68 regular season
October: 3–3–1 (home: 2–1–1; road: 1–2–0)

Game	Date	Score	Opponent	Decision	Attendance	Record	Points	Recap
1	October 11	1–5	@ California Seals	Parent	6,886	0–1–0	0	L
2	October 14	2–4	@ Los Angeles Kings	Favell	7,035	0–2–0	0	L
3	October 18	2–1	@ St. Louis Blues	Favell	5,234	1–2–0	2	W
4	October 19	1–0	Pittsburgh Penguins	Favell	7,812	2–2–0	4	W
5	October 22	5–2	California Seals	Favell	5,783	3–2–0	6	W
6	October 28	1–3	Detroit Red Wings	Favell	10,859	3–3–0	6	L
7	October 29	2–2	California Seals	Favell	4,708	3–3–1	7	T

November: 7–4–3 (home: 4–2–1; road: 3–2–2)

Game	Date	Score	Opponent	Decision	Attendance	Record	Points	Recap
8	November 2	1–3	Minnesota North Stars	Favell	4,203	3–4–1	7	L
9	November 4	4–1	@ Montreal Canadiens	Parent	14,822	4–4–1	9	W
10	November 5	1–1	Montreal Canadiens	Parent	9,188	4–4–2	10	T
11	November 8	1–1	@ Pittsburgh Penguins	Parent	4,719	4–4–3	11	T
12	November 12	4–2	@ Boston Bruins	Parent	13,909	5–4–3	13	W
13	November 15	0–5	@ Pittsburgh Penguins	Parent	6,876	5–5–3	13	L
14	November 16	3–2	New York Rangers	Favell	11,276	6–5–3	15	W
15	November 18	2–2	@ Minnesota North Stars	Favell	10,466	6–5–4	16	T
16	November 19	3–2	St. Louis Blues	Parent	7,102	7–5–4	18	W
17	November 22	4–2	Detroit Red Wings	Parent	12,086	8–5–4	20	W
18	November 25	2–1	@ St. Louis Blues	Parent	8,570	9–5–4	22	W
19	November 26	7–2	Los Angeles Kings	Parent	11,420	10–5–4	24	W
20	November 29	1–3	@ Chicago Black Hawks	Parent	17,200	10–6–4	24	L
21	November 30	1–3	California Seals	Parent	3,167	10–7–4	24	L

December: 7–5–1 (home: 4–2–1; road: 3–3–0)

Game	Date	Score	Opponent	Decision	Attendance	Record	Points	Recap
22	December 3	4–2	St. Louis Blues	Parent	8,727	11–7–4	26	W
23	December 6	2–4	@ California Seals	Favell	2,426	11–8–4	26	L
24	December 8	3–0	@ Los Angeles Kings	Favell	4,624	12–8–4	28	W
25	December 10	0–3	Chicago Black Hawks	Favell	14,646	12–9–4	28	L
26	December 14	2–2	St. Louis Blues	Parent	8,005	12–9–5	29	T
27	December 16	1–0	@ St. Louis Blues	Parent	7,570	13–9–5	31	W
28	December 17	2–1	Pittsburgh Penguins	Parent	7,522	14–9–5	33	W
29	December 21	6–0	Minnesota North Stars	Parent	7,638	15–9–5	35	W
30	December 23	2–3	@ Chicago Black Hawks	Parent	17,500	15–10–5	35	L
31	December 25	1–3	New York Rangers	Parent	9,456	15–11–5	35	L
32	December 28	3–5	@ Detroit Red Wings	Favell	13,568	15–12–5	35	L
33	December 30	2–0	@ Los Angeles Kings	Favell	14,000	16–12–5	37	W
34	December 31	9–1	Los Angeles Kings	Favell	5,643	17–12–5	39	W

January: 4–7–2 (home: 1–4–1; road: 3–3–1)

Game	Date	Score	Opponent	Decision	Attendance	Record	Points	Recap
35	January 4	2–3	Boston Bruins	Parent	10,097	17–13–5	39	L
36	January 6	2–2	@ Pittsburgh Penguins	Favell	7,351	17–13–6	40	T
37	January 7	3–1	Pittsburgh Penguins	Favell	7,935	18–13–6	42	W
38	January 10	4–6	@ Minnesota North Stars	Favell	9,768	18–14–6	42	L
39	January 11	2–4	Montreal Canadiens	Parent	14,126	18–15–6	42	L
40	January 14	6–3	@ Oakland Seals^{[a]}	Parent	2,878	19–15–6	44	W
41	January 18	4–2	@ Minnesota North Stars	Favell	9,098	20–15–6	46	W
42	January 20	2–4	@ Boston Bruins	Parent	13,527	20–16–6	46	L
43	January 21	2–2	St. Louis Blues	Parent	10,834	20–16–7	47	T
44	January 24	2–1	@ Toronto Maple Leafs	Favell	15,834	21–16–7	49	W
45	January 25	0–3	Minnesota North Stars	Parent	9,334	21–17–7	49	L
46	January 27	2–3	@ Detroit Red Wings	Parent	12,820	21–18–7	49	L
47	January 28	0–2	Los Angeles Kings	Favell	13,577	21–19–7	49	L
Notes:^{a} The California Seals changed their name to the Oakland Seals on December 8, 1967.

February: 5–6–2 (home: 3–2–1; road: 2–4–1)

Game	Date	Score	Opponent	Decision	Attendance	Record	Points	Recap
48	February 1	3–3	Oakland Seals	Favell	6,386	21–19–8	50	T
49	February 3	5–3	Chicago Black Hawks	Parent	14,646	22–19–8	52	W
50	February 4	4–1	Toronto Maple Leafs	Favell	14,646	23–19–8	54	W
51	February 7	1–4	@ Montreal Canadiens	Parent	14,026	23–20–8	54	L
52	February 10	2–1	@ St. Louis Blues	Favell	13,112	24–20–8	56	W
53	February 11	3–2	@ Minnesota North Stars	Favell	15,154	25–20–8	58	W
54	February 14	0–4	@ Oakland Seals	Parent	3,069	25–21–8	58	L
55	February 16	1–7	@ Los Angeles Kings	Parent	9,867	25–22–8	58	L
56	February 18	1–3	@ New York Rangers	Favell	17,250	25–23–8	58	L
57	February 21	1–1	@ Pittsburgh Penguins	Favell	9,198	25–23–9	59	T
58	February 22	7–3	Minnesota North Stars	Favell	14,392	26–23–9	61	W
59	February 25	1–2	Pittsburgh Penguins	Favell	14,418	26–24–9	61	L
60	February 29	1–3	Los Angeles Kings	Favell	9,115	26–25–9	61	L

March: 5–7–2 (home: 3–2–2; road: 2–5–0)

Game	Date	Score	Opponent	Decision	Attendance	Record	Points	Recap
61	March 2	0–4	@ New York Rangers	Parent	17,235	26–26–9	61	L
62	March 3	1–1	Oakland Seals^{[b]}	Favell	12,127	26–26–10	62	T
63	March 6	2–7	@ Toronto Maple Leafs	Favell	15,831	26–27–10	62	L
64	March 7	1–2	Boston Bruins^{[c]}	Parent	10,452	26–28–10	62	L
65	March 10	2–0	Minnesota North Stars^{[d]}	Parent	10,171	27–28–10	64	W
66	March 13	4–2	@ Minnesota North Stars	Favell	13,387	28–28–10	66	W
67	March 14	0–0	Los Angeles Kings^{[d]}	Parent	4,116	28–28–11	67	T
68	March 17	7–4	Toronto Maple Leafs^{[d]}	Parent	13,650	29–28–11	69	W
69	March 20	5–1	@ Oakland Seals	Parent	3,918	30–28–11	71	W
70	March 23	2–4	@ Los Angeles Kings	Parent	14,003	30–29–11	71	L
71	March 27	0–3	@ St. Louis Blues	Favell	9,315	30–30–11	71	L
72	March 28	2–0	St. Louis Blues^{[d]}	Favell	5,382	31–30–11	73	W
73	March 30	0–2	Pittsburgh Penguins^{[d]}	Favell	5,569	31–31–11	73	L
74	March 31	1–5	@ Pittsburgh Penguins	Favell	6,756	31–32–11	73	L
Notes:^{b} Game played at Madison Square Garden due to the roof blowing off the Spectrum during a March 1 storm.^{c} Game played at Maple Leaf Gardens due to the roof blowing off the Spectrum during a March 1 storm.^{d} Game played at Le Colisée due to the roof blowing off the Spectrum during a March 1 storm.

Legend: W Win (2 points) L Loss (0 points) T Tie (1 point)

=== Playoffs ===
1968 Stanley Cup playoffs
Quarterfinals vs. St. Louis Blues – Blues win 4–3

Game	Date	Score	Opponent	Decision	Attendance	Series	Recap
1	April 4	0–1	St. Louis Blues	Parent	10,649	Blues lead 1–0	L
2	April 6	4–3	St. Louis Blues	Favell	11,111	Series tied 1–1	W
3	April 10	2–3 2OT	@ St. Louis Blues	Parent	10,867	Blues lead 2–1	L
4	April 11	2–5	@ St. Louis Blues	Favell	11,070	Blues lead 3–1	L
5	April 13	6–1	St. Louis Blues	Parent	10,587	Blues lead 3–2	W
6	April 16	2–1 2OT	@ St. Louis Blues	Parent	13,738	Series tied 3–3	W
7	April 18	1–3	St. Louis Blues	Parent	14,646	Blues win 4–3	L

Legend: W Win L Loss

== Player statistics ==
=== Scoring ===
- Position abbreviations: C = Center; D = Defense; G = Goaltender; LW = Left wing; RW = Right wing
- † = Joined team via a transaction (e.g., trade, waivers, signing) during the season. Stats reflect time with the Flyers only.
- ‡ = Left team via a transaction (e.g., trade, waivers, release) during the season. Stats reflect time with the Flyers only.

No.	Player	Pos	Regular season						Playoffs					
No.	Player	Pos	GP	G	A	Pts	+/-	PIM	GP	G	A	Pts	+/-	PIM
7	Lou Angotti	C	70	12	37	49	4	35	7	0	0	0	1	2
12	Gary Dornhoefer	RW	65	13	30	43	6	134	3	0	0	0	−3	15
9	Leon Rochefort	RW	74	21	21	42	−1	16	7	2	0	2	−2	2
18	Ed Hoekstra	C	70	15	21	36	6	6	7	0	1	1	−3	0
10	Brit Selby	LW	56	15	15	30	−3	24	7	1	1	2	0	4
11	Bill Sutherland	LW	60	20	9	29	1	6	7	1	3	4	−1	0
8	Don Blackburn	LW	67	9	20	29	−2	23	7	3	0	3	1	8
22	Forbes Kennedy	C	73	10	18	28	4	130	7	1	4	5	0	14
14	Pat Hannigan	RW	65	11	15	26	6	36	7	1	2	3	−2	9
16	Claude LaForge	LW	63	9	16	25	8	36	5	1	2	3	0	15
4	John Miszuk	D	74	5	17	22	1	79	7	0	3	3	1	11
3	Joe Watson	D	73	5	14	19	12	56	7	1	1	2	0	28
2	Ed Van Impe	D	67	4	13	17	−5	141	7	0	4	4	−1	11
15	Andre Lacroix	C	18	6	8	14	0	6	7	2	3	5	−2	0
15	Garry Peters	C	31	7	5	12	−2	22	—	—	—	—	—	—
5	Jean Gauthier	D	65	5	7	12	0	74	7	1	3	4	−2	6
24	Larry Zeidel†	D	57	1	10	11	12	68	7	0	1	1	0	12
17	Wayne Hicks‡	RW	32	2	7	9	−5	6	—	—	—	—	—	—
19	Art Stratton†	C	12	0	4	4	−4	4	5	0	0	0	−1	0
21	Jim Johnson	C	13	2	1	3	−1	2	—	—	—	—	—	—
20 (Note: Paiement wore number 19 in his final three regular season games.)	Rosaire Paiement†	RW	7	1	0	1	1	11	3	3	0	3	2	0
20	Jean-Guy Gendron	LW	1	0	1	1	1	2	—	—	—	—	—	—
30	Bernie Parent	G	38	0	1	1		23	5	0	0	0		0
21	Terry Ball	D	1	0	0	0	−1	0	—	—	—	—	—	—
21	Dwight Carruthers	D	1	0	0	0	0	0	—	—	—	—	—	—
1	Doug Favell	G	37	0	0	0		37	2	0	0	0		5
6	John Hanna	D	15	0	0	0	1	0	—	—	—	—	—	—
6	Ralph MacSweyn	D	4	0	0	0	0	0	—	—	—	—	—	—
21	Simon Nolet	RW	4	0	0	0	−1	2	1	0	0	0	0	0
19	Roger Pelletier	D	1	0	0	0	0	0	—	—	—	—	—	—
20	Keith Wright	LW	1	0	0	0	1	0	—	—	—	—	—	—

=== Goaltending ===
No.	Player	Regular season											Playoffs									
No.	Player	GP	GS	W	L	T	SA	GA	GAA	SV%	SO	TOI	GP	GS	W	L	SA	GA	GAA	SV%	SO	TOI
1	Doug Favell	37	37	16	15	6	1204	83	2.27	.931	4	2,191	2	2	1	1	62	8	4.01	.871	0	120
30	Bernie Parent	38	37	15	17	5	1249	93	2.49	.926	4	2,244	5	5	2	3	215	8	1.36	.963	0	354

== Awards and records ==
=== Awards ===
Type	Award/honor	Recipient	Ref
League (in-season)	NHL All-Star Game selection	Leon Rochefort	

=== Records ===
Excluding the shortened 1994–95, 2012–13, and 2020–21 seasons, the 173 goals scored during the regular season is the lowest total in franchise history. During game six of the team’s playoff series against St. Louis that the Flyers won 2–1 in the second overtime period, goaltender Bernie Parent made 63 saves on 64 shots against, both team records. His playoff year totals for goals against average (1.36) is also a team record and his save percentage (.963) is a league record.

=== Milestones ===
Milestone	Player	Date	Ref
First game	Ed Hoekstra	October 11, 1967	
First game	Doug Favell	October 14, 1967	
First game	Rosaire Paiement	October 18, 1967	
First game	Roger Pelletier	December 31, 1967	
First game	Keith Wright	February 7, 1968	
First game	Simon Nolet	February 10, 1968	
First game	Andre Lacroix	February 21, 1968	
First game	Terry Ball	March 6, 1968	
First game	Ralph MacSweyn	March 10, 1968	

=== Franchise firsts ===
Milestone	Player	Date	Ref
Players on ice for opening faceoff	Lou Angotti (F)	October 11, 1967	
Players on ice for opening faceoff	Jean Gauthier (D)	October 11, 1967	
Players on ice for opening faceoff	Wayne Hicks (F)	October 11, 1967	
Players on ice for opening faceoff	John Miszuk (D)	October 11, 1967	
Players on ice for opening faceoff	Bernie Parent (G)	October 11, 1967	
Players on ice for opening faceoff	Brit Selby (F)	October 11, 1967	
Penalty	Lou Angotti	October 11, 1967 (Note: 2 minutes for interference at 0:21 of the first period)	
Goal	Bill Sutherland	October 11, 1967 (Note: Even-strength goal at 10:07 of the second period against Charlie Hodge. Rochefort and Miszuk received assists.)	
Assists	Leon Rochefort	October 11, 1967	
Assists	John Miszuk	October 11, 1967	
Game-winning goal	Ed Hoekstra	October 18, 1967 (Note: Even-strength goal at 12:40 of the third period against Glenn Hall)	
Shutout	Doug Favell	October 19, 1967 (Note: Stopped all 21 shots against the Pittsburgh Penguins)	
Powerplay goal	Ed Hoekstra	October 22, 1967 (Note: Scored at 13:17 of the first period against Charlie Hodge)	
Shorthanded goal	Forbes Kennedy	October 29, 1967 (Note: Scored at 4:19 of the first period against Charlie Hodge)	
Hat-trick	Leon Rochefort	November 4, 1967 (Note: Rochefort scored a powerplay goal at 4:23 of the first period and even-strength goals at 10:18 and 13:31 of the third period against Canadiens goalie Rogie Vachon.)	
20-goal season	Leon Rochefort	February 29, 1968 (Note: Powerplay goal at 14:58 of the first period against Wayne Rutledge)	
Penalty, playoffs	John Miszuk	April 4, 1968 (Note: 2 minutes for high-sticking at 1:00 of the first period)	
Goal, playoffs	Pat Hannigan	April 6, 1968 (Note: Even-strength goal at 1:32 of the first period against Glenn Hall. LaForge and Gauthier received assists.)	
Assists, playoffs	Claude LaForge	April 6, 1968	
Assists, playoffs	Jean Gauthier	April 6, 1968	
Powerplay goal, playoffs	Don Blackburn	April 6, 1968 (Note: Scored at 18:37 of the first period against Glenn Hall)	
Game-winning goal, playoffs	Leon Rochefort	April 6, 1968 (Note: Even-strength goal at 6:51 of the third period against Glenn Hall)	
Shorthanded goal, playoffs	Forbes Kennedy	April 13, 1968 (Note: Scored at 15:52 of the first period against Glenn Hall)	
Hat-trick, playoffs	Rosaire Paiement	April 13, 1968 (Note: Paiement scored an even-strength goal at 13:18 of the first period and powerplay goals at 10:27 and 13:25 of the third period against Blues goalie Glenn Hall.)	
Overtime goal, playoffs	Don Blackburn	April 16, 1968 (Note: Even-strength goal at 11:18 of the second overtime period against Glenn Hall)	

== Transactions ==
The Flyers were involved in the following transactions from May 3, 1967, the day after the deciding game of the 1967 Stanley Cup Final, through May 11, 1968, the day of the deciding game of the 1968 Stanley Cup Final.

=== Trades ===
Date	Details		Ref
September 12, 1967	To Philadelphia Flyers: Al Millar	To Toronto Maple Leafs: cash	
September 14, 1967	To Philadelphia Flyers: Dick Sarrazin	To Detroit Red Wings: cash	
October 18, 1967	To Philadelphia Flyers: Rosaire Paiement	To Boston Bruins: 1st-round pick in 1970	
October 20, 1967	To Philadelphia Flyers: Larry Zeidel	To Cleveland Barons (AHL): cash	
February 27, 1968	To Philadelphia Flyers: Future considerations (Note: The Penguins had to send a player or cash to the Flyers. Art Stratton was sent to the Flyers on March 1.)	To Pittsburgh Penguins: Wayne Hicks	

=== Players acquired ===
Date	Player	Former team	Via	Ref
May 8, 1967	Gil Banville	Quebec Aces (AHL)	Purchase of AHL team	
May 8, 1967	Rene Drolet	Quebec Aces (AHL)	Purchase of AHL team	
May 8, 1967	Jean-Guy Gendron	Quebec Aces (AHL)	Purchase of AHL team	
May 8, 1967	John Hanna	Quebec Aces (AHL)	Purchase of AHL team	
May 8, 1967	Wayne Hicks	Quebec Aces (AHL)	Purchase of AHL team	
May 8, 1967	Ed Hoekstra	Quebec Aces (AHL)	Purchase of AHL team	
May 8, 1967	Yvon Lacoste	Quebec Aces (AHL)	Purchase of AHL team	
May 8, 1967	Andre Lacroix	Quebec Aces (AHL)	Purchase of AHL team	
May 8, 1967	Claude LaForge	Quebec Aces (AHL)	Purchase of AHL team	
May 8, 1967	Ray LaRose	Quebec Aces (AHL)	Purchase of AHL team	
May 8, 1967	Ralph MacSweyn	Quebec Aces (AHL)	Purchase of AHL team	
May 8, 1967	Jim Morrison	Quebec Aces (AHL)	Purchase of AHL team	
May 8, 1967	Keke Mortson	Quebec Aces (AHL)	Purchase of AHL team	
May 8, 1967	Simon Nolet	Quebec Aces (AHL)	Purchase of AHL team	
May 8, 1967	Roger Pelletier	Quebec Aces (AHL)	Purchase of AHL team	
May 8, 1967	Fern Rivard	Quebec Aces (AHL)	Purchase of AHL team	
May 8, 1967	Rino Robazza	Quebec Aces (AHL)	Purchase of AHL team	
May 8, 1967	Bill Sutherland	Quebec Aces (AHL)	Purchase of AHL team	
June 6, 1967	Dick Cherry	Boston Bruins	Expansion draft	
June 6, 1967	Gary Dornhoefer	Boston Bruins	Expansion draft	
June 6, 1967	Doug Favell	Boston Bruins	Expansion draft	
June 6, 1967	Forbes Kennedy	Boston Bruins	Expansion draft	
June 6, 1967	Bernie Parent	Boston Bruins	Expansion draft	
June 6, 1967	Joe Watson	Boston Bruins	Expansion draft	
June 6, 1967	Keith Wright	Boston Bruins	Expansion draft	
June 6, 1967	Lou Angotti	Chicago Black Hawks	Expansion draft	
June 6, 1967	Pat Hannigan	Chicago Black Hawks	Expansion draft	
June 6, 1967	John Miszuk	Chicago Black Hawks	Expansion draft	
June 6, 1967	Ed Van Impe	Chicago Black Hawks	Expansion draft	
June 6, 1967	Dwight Carruthers	Detroit Red Wings	Expansion draft	
June 6, 1967	Bob Courcy	Montreal Canadiens	Expansion draft	
June 6, 1967	Jean Gauthier	Montreal Canadiens	Expansion draft	
June 6, 1967	Garry Peters	Montreal Canadiens	Expansion draft	
June 6, 1967	Leon Rochefort	Montreal Canadiens	Expansion draft	
June 6, 1967	Terry Ball	New York Rangers	Expansion draft	
June 6, 1967	Jim Johnson	New York Rangers	Expansion draft	
June 6, 1967	Don Blackburn	Toronto Maple Leafs	Expansion draft	
June 6, 1967	Brit Selby	Toronto Maple Leafs	Expansion draft	
August 12, 1967	Claude Cyr	Drummondville Eagles (QSHL)	Free agency	
September 20, 1967	Ian Campbell	Florida Rockets (EHL)	Free agency	
September 20, 1967	Larry McKillop	Charlotte Checkers (EHL)	Free agency	
April 30, 1968	Andre Gaudette	Montreal Junior Canadiens (OHA)	Free agency	

=== Signings ===
Date	Player	Term	Ref
August 12, 1967	Bernie Parent	3-year	
September 13, 1967	Gary Dornhoefer		
September 13, 1967	Forbes Kennedy		
September 13, 1967	Jim Johnson		
September 13, 1967	Keith Wright		
September 14, 1967	Serge Bernier		
September 14, 1967	Andre Lacroix		
September 15, 1967	Lou Angotti		
September 15, 1967	Gil Banville	1-year	
September 18, 1967	John Miszuk		
September 18, 1967	Garry Peters		
September 22, 1967	Ralph MacSweyn		
September 25, 1967	Dwight Carruthers		
September 25, 1967	Brit Selby		
September 28, 1967	Doug Favell		
September 28, 1967	Jean Gauthier		
September 30, 1967	Ed Van Impe	2-year	
October 3, 1967	Joe Watson	2-year	
October 5, 1967	John Hanna		
October 5, 1967	Ed Hoekstra		
October 5, 1967	Al Millar		
October 9, 1967	Don Blackburn	1-year	
October 9, 1967	Pat Hannigan	1-year	
October 9, 1967	Bill Sutherland	2-year	
October 11, 1967	Wayne Hicks		
October 11, 1967	Leon Rochefort		
October 24, 1967	Jim Morrison		

== Draft picks ==
=== NHL expansion draft ===
Philadelphia's picks at the 1967 NHL expansion draft, which was held at the Queen Elizabeth Hotel in Montreal, on June 6, 1967.

Round	Pick	Player	Position	Team
1	2	Bernie Parent	Goaltender	Boston Bruins
2	9	Doug Favell	Goaltender	Boston Bruins
3	16	Ed Van Impe	Defense	Chicago Black Hawks
4	21	Joe Watson	Defense	Boston Bruins
5	27	Brit Selby	Left wing	Toronto Maple Leafs
6	33	Lou Angotti	Right wing	Chicago Black Hawks
7	39	Leon Rochefort	Right wing	Montreal Canadiens
8	45	Don Blackburn	Left wing	Toronto Maple Leafs
9	51	John Miszuk	Defense	Chicago Black Hawks
10	57	Garry Peters	Center	Montreal Canadiens
11	63	Dick Cherry	Defense	Boston Bruins
12	69	Jean Gauthier	Defense	Montreal Canadiens
13	75	Jim Johnson	Center	New York Rangers
14	81	Gary Dornhoefer	Right wing	Boston Bruins
15	87	Forbes Kennedy	Center	Boston Bruins
16	93	Pat Hannigan	Left wing	Toronto Maple Leafs
17	99	Dwight Carruthers	Defense	Detroit Red Wings
18	105	Bob Courcy	Center	Montreal Canadiens
19	111	Keith Wright	Right wing	Boston Bruins
20	117	Terry Ball	Defense	New York Rangers

=== NHL amateur draft ===
Philadelphia's picks at the 1967 NHL amateur draft, which was held at the Queen Elizabeth Hotel in Montreal, Quebec, on June 7, 1967.

Round	Pick	Player	Position	Nationality	Team (league)
1	5	Serge Bernier	Center	Canada	Sorel Éperviers (QJHL)
2	14	Al Sarault	Defense	Canada	Pembroke Lumber Kings (CJAHL)

=== NHL special internal amateur draft ===
Philadelphia's picks at the 1967 NHL special internal amateur draft, which was held at the Queen Elizabeth Hotel in Montreal, Quebec, on June 7, 1967. Sponsored players aged 20 before May 31, 1967, who played as amateurs during the 1966–67 season were eligible for selection. There were only four selections total in this draft, two of which were made by the Flyers.

Player	Position	Nationality	Team (league)	NHL rights
John Marshall	Right wing	Canada	Markham Seal-a-Wax (MJBHL)	Toronto Maple Leafs
Ken Schutz	Right wing	Canada	London Nationals (OHA)	Toronto Maple Leafs

== Farm teams ==
The Flyers were affiliated with the Quebec Aces of the AHL, whom they purchased on May 8, 1967, the Seattle Totems and Phoenix Roadrunners of the WHL, and the Knoxville Knights of the EHL. Quebec finished second in their division and made it to the Calder Cup Finals before losing to the Rochester Americans in six games. Head coach Vic Stasiuk was awarded the Louis A. R. Pieri Memorial Award as coach of the year and Simon Nolet won the John B. Sollenberger Trophy as the league's leading scorer. Seattle finished second in the five-team WHL and won the Lester Patrick Cup as league champions. Knoxville finished ninth in the 12-team EHL and missed the playoffs in what proved to be their final season in existence.
