= Ed Hoekstra =

Canadian ice hockey player

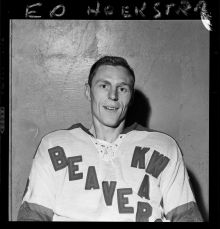
- Ed Hoekstra in KW Beavers jersey. (1961)
- Born: November 4, 1937; Winnipeg, Manitoba, Canada
- Died: November 10, 2011 (aged 74); St. Catharines, Ontario, Canada
- Height: 5 ft 11 in (180 cm)
- Weight: 170 lb (77 kg; 12 st 2 lb)
- Position: Centre
- Shot: Right
- Played for: Philadelphia Flyers; Houston Aeros
- Playing career: 1958–1974

Edward Adrian Hoekstra (November 4, 1937 – November 10, 2011) was a Canadian professional ice hockey player. He played 70 games in the National Hockey League (NHL) with the Philadelphia Flyers during the 1967–68 season and played 97 games in the World Hockey Association (WHA) with the Houston Aeros from 1972 to 1974. The rest of his career, which lasted from 1958 to 1974, was spent in the minor leagues. He was the brother of Cecil Hoekstra, who also played hockey.

== Career statistics ==
=== Regular season and playoffs ===
| | | | Regular season | | | | | Playoffs |
| Season | Team | League | GP | G | A | Pts | PIM | GP | G | A | Pts | PIM |
|---|---|---|---|---|---|---|---|---|---|---|---|---|
| 1954–55 | St. Catharines Teepees | OHA | 49 | 17 | 21 | 38 | 20 | 11 | 3 | 2 | 5 | 21 |
| 1955–56 | St. Catharines Teepees | OHA | 48 | 22 | 31 | 53 | 18 | 6 | 2 | 0 | 2 | 4 |
| 1956–57 | St. Catharines Teepees | OHA | 52 | 28 | 42 | 70 | 22 | 14 | 11 | 15 | 26 | 2 |
| 1957–58 | St. Catharines Teepees | OHA | 49 | 35 | 58 | 93 | 28 | 8 | 2 | 6 | 8 | 4 |
| 1958–59 | Trois-Rivières Lions | QSHL | 58 | 19 | 37 | 56 | 8 | 8 | 3 | 4 | 7 | 0 |
| 1959–60 | Cleveland Barons | AHL | 66 | 20 | 38 | 58 | 4 | 7 | 4 | 3 | 7 | 0 |
| 1960–61 | Kitchener Beavers | EPHL | 70 | 32 | 33 | 65 | 18 | 7 | 2 | 3 | 5 | 0 |
| 1961–62 | Kitchener Beavers | EPHL | 44 | 23 | 27 | 50 | 16 | — | — | — | — | — |
| 1961–62 | Quebec Aces | AHL | 22 | 6 | 10 | 16 | 2 | — | — | — | — | — |
| 1962–63 | Quebec Aces | AHL | 30 | 6 | 8 | 14 | 2 | — | — | — | — | — |
| 1963–64 | Quebec Aces | AHL | 71 | 20 | 44 | 64 | 22 | 6 | 2 | 2 | 4 | 2 |
| 1964–65 | Quebec Aces | AHL | 71 | 28 | 51 | 79 | 16 | 5 | 0 | 3 | 3 | 6 |
| 1965–66 | Quebec Aces | AHL | 61 | 24 | 50 | 74 | 10 | 6 | 5 | 0 | 5 | 4 |
| 1966–67 | Quebec Aces | AHL | 7 | 1 | 0 | 1 | 0 | — | — | — | — | — |
| 1966–67 | California Seals | WHL | 31 | 11 | 7 | 18 | 4 | 6 | 1 | 3 | 4 | 2 |
| 1967–68 | Philadelphia Flyers | NHL | 70 | 15 | 21 | 36 | 6 | 7 | 0 | 1 | 1 | 0 |
| 1968–69 | Denver Spurs | WHL | 62 | 20 | 49 | 69 | 4 | — | — | — | — | — |
| 1969–70 | Denver Spurs | WHL | 27 | 9 | 18 | 27 | 2 | — | — | — | — | — |
| 1969–70 | Buffalo Bisons | AHL | 1 | 0 | 0 | 0 | 0 | — | — | — | — | — |
| 1970–71 | Denver Spurs | WHL | 30 | 11 | 11 | 22 | 0 | — | — | — | — | — |
| 1970–71 | Springfield Kings | AHL | 44 | 13 | 22 | 35 | 4 | 12 | 4 | 2 | 6 | 4 |
| 1971–72 | Springfield Kings | AHL | 74 | 16 | 69 | 85 | 32 | 5 | 1 | 1 | 2 | 0 |
| 1972–73 | Houston Aeros | WHA | 78 | 11 | 28 | 39 | 12 | 9 | 1 | 2 | 3 | 0 |
| 1973–74 | Houston Aeros | WHA | 19 | 2 | 0 | 2 | 0 | — | — | — | — | — |
| 1973–74 | Macon Whoopees | SHL | 2 | 0 | 5 | 5 | 0 | — | — | — | — | — |
| 1973–74 | Jacksonville Barons | AHL | 29 | 11 | 12 | 23 | 2 | — | — | — | — | — |
| WHA totals | | | 97 | 13 | 28 | 41 | 12 | 9 | 1 | 2 | 3 | 0 |
| NHL totals | | | 70 | 15 | 21 | 36 | 6 | 7 | 0 | 1 | 1 | 0 |
