= John Hanna (ice hockey) =

Canadian ice hockey player and coach

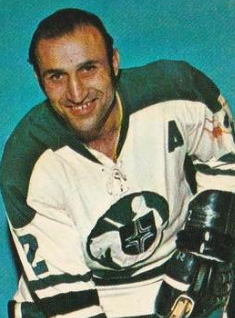
- Hanna in 1972–73
- Born: April 5, 1935 Sydney, Nova Scotia, Canada
- Died: November 20, 2005 (aged 70) Sydney, Nova Scotia, Canada
- Height: 5 ft 10 in (178 cm)
- Weight: 175 lb (79 kg; 12 st 7 lb)
- Position: Defence
- Shot: Right
- Played for: New York Rangers; Montreal Canadiens; Philadelphia Flyers; Cleveland Crusaders
- Playing career: 1955–1975

John Isaac "Junior" Hanna (April 5, 1935 – November 20, 2005) was a Canadian professional ice hockey defenceman and coach. He played in the National Hockey League (NHL) from 1958 to 1968 and in the World Hockey Association (WHA) from 1972 to 1973. Hanna was one of the first NHL players to be of Lebanese descent.

== Biography ==
Hanna was born in Sydney, Nova Scotia. He played junior hockey for the Trois-Rivières Lions and the Chicoutimi Sagueneens before signing a professional contract. He played 198 games in the NHL with the New York Rangers, Montreal Canadiens, and Philadelphia Flyers. He also played 66 games in the WHA with the Cleveland Crusaders. However, the majority of his career was spent in the minors with the Quebec Aces of the American Hockey League (AHL) and the Seattle Totems of the Western Hockey League (WHL).

After retiring from competitive play, he was hired for several brief coaching stints in the AHL. He also served as head coach of the Cleveland Crusaders of the WHA for part of the 1974–75 season.

Hanna died of cancer on November 20, 2005.

== Career statistics ==
=== Regular season and playoffs ===
			Regular season					Playoffs
Season	Team	League	GP	G	A	Pts	PIM	GP	G	A	Pts	PIM
1953–54	Sydney Bruins	CBJHL	—	—	—	—	—	—	—	—	—	—
1953–54	North Sydney Falcons	M-Cup	—	—	—	—	—	5	1	1	2	4
1954–55	Trois-Rivières Reds	QJHL	42	3	6	9	107	9	0	1	1	10
1955–56	Philadelphia Ramblers	EHL	28	1	4	5	13	—	—	—	—	—
1955–56	Chicoutimi Sagueneens	QSHL	40	3	14	17	101	5	0	0	0	4
1956–57	Chicoutimi Sagueneens	QSHL	43	1	14	15	64	10	1	2	3	10
1957–58	Trois-Rivières Reds	QSHL	48	3	25	28	66	—	—	—	—	—
1957–58	Providence Reds	AHL	7	0	3	3	24	3	1	1	2	10
1958–59	New York Rangers	NHL	70	1	10	11	83	—	—	—	—	—
1959–60	New York Rangers	NHL	61	4	8	12	87	—	—	—	—	—
1960–61	New York Rangers	NHL	46	1	8	9	34	—	—	—	—	—
1960–61	Springfield Indians	AHL	18	2	2	4	14	—	—	—	—	—
1961–62	Quebec Aces	AHL	65	0	17	17	85	—	—	—	—	—
1962–63	Quebec Aces	AHL	70	7	21	28	61	—	—	—	—	—
1963–64	Montreal Canadiens	NHL	6	0	0	0	2	—	—	—	—	—
1963–64	Quebec Aces	AHL	58	4	14	18	54	9	0	4	4	10
1964–65	Quebec Aces	AHL	70	9	25	34	83	5	0	0	0	6
1965–66	Quebec Aces	AHL	69	4	22	26	93	6	0	1	1	20
1966–67	Quebec Aces	AHL	67	6	20	26	54	4	0	0	0	4
1967–68	Philadelphia Flyers	NHL	15	0	0	0	0	—	—	—	—	—
1967–68	Quebec Aces	AHL	24	1	12	13	27	14	2	6	8	34
1968–69	Seattle Totems	WHL	71	25	27	52	49	4	0	1	1	2
1969–70	Seattle Totems	WHL	66	9	33	42	38	6	0	1	1	11
1970–71	Seattle Totems	WHL	70	20	40	60	68	—	—	—	—	—
1971–72	Seattle Totems	WHL	36	5	10	15	16	—	—	—	—	—
1972–73	Cleveland Crusaders	WHA	66	6	20	26	68	—	—	—	—	—
1973–74	Jacksonville Barons	AHL	11	2	4	6	4	—	—	—	—	—
1974–75	Syracuse Eagles	AHL	1	0	0	0	0	—	—	—	—	—
WHA totals			66	6	20	26	68	—	—	—	—	—
NHL totals			198	6	26	32	206	—	—	—	—	—

=== Coaching stats ===
Team	Year	Regular season						Postseason
Team	Year	G	W	L	T	Pts	Division rank	Result
Cleveland Crusaders	1974-75	34	14	19	1	29	2nd in East	Missed playoffs
