= Claude LaForge =

Canadian ice hockey player

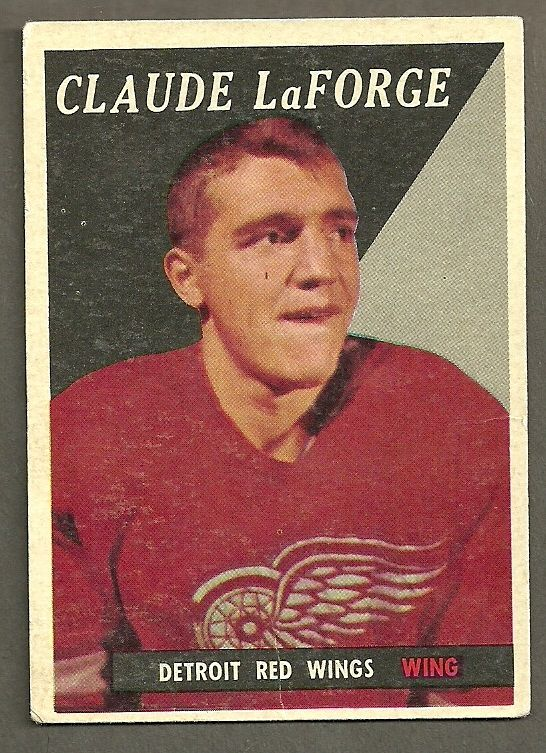
- Born: July 1, 1936; Sorel-Tracy, Quebec, Canada
- Died: May 4, 2015 (aged 78); Longueuil, Quebec, Canada
- Height: 5 ft 8 in (173 cm)
- Weight: 160 lb (73 kg; 11 st 6 lb)
- Position: Left wing
- Shot: Left
- Played for: Montreal Canadiens; Detroit Red Wings; Philadelphia Flyers
- Playing career: 1957–1973

Joseph Claude Roger LaForge (July 1, 1936 – May 4, 2015) was a Canadian ice hockey player. He played in the National Hockey League with the Montreal Canadiens, Detroit Red Wings, and Philadelphia Flyers between 1958 and 1968. The rest of his career, which lasted from 1957 to 1973, was mainly spent in the American Hockey League.

== Playing career ==
Before playing in the NHL, LaForge played 2 games with the Montreal Royals and one season with the Shawinigan Falls Cataractes of the Quebec Hockey League (QHL) and one season with the Cincinnati Mohawks of the International Hockey League (IHL). In 1958, LaForge was named to the QHL Second All-Star Team.

He started his NHL career with the Montreal Canadiens during the 1957–58 season. He would play a total of 5 games with the Canadiens. On June 3, 1958, the Canadiens traded LaForge along with Gene Achtymichuk and Bud MacPherson to the Detroit Red Wings in exchange for money.

LeForge spent time between the Red Wings and their American Hockey League-affiliates, the Hershey Bears and Pittsburgh Hornets. After spending parts of 5 years with Detroit, he was sent down to the Hornets and was then traded to the Quebec Aces of the AHL in exchange for Terry Gray on March 1, 1966.

When the Philadelphia Flyers bought the Aces on May 8, 1967, LaForge's NHL rights were transferred to the team. He played 65 regular-season games with the Flyers. In August 1970, the Flyers traded LaForge to the Denver Spurs of the Western Hockey League (WHL) in exchange for money. After spending 3 seasons with the Spurs, LaForge retired from playing professional ice hockey.

== Career statistics ==
=== Regular season and playoffs ===
			Regular season					Playoffs
Season	Team	League	GP	G	A	Pts	PIM	GP	G	A	Pts	PIM
1954–55	Montreal Junior Canadiens	QJHL	45	18	4	22	43	5	1	0	1	0
1955–56	Montreal Junior Canadiens	QJHL	—	—	—	—	—	—	—	—	—	—
1955–56	Montreal Royals	QSHL	2	0	0	0	2	—	—	—	—	—
1955–56	Montreal Junior Canadiens	M-Cup	—	—	—	—	—	10	1	4	5	11
1956–57	Shawinigan Falls Cataractes	QSHL	60	12	13	25	10	—	—	—	—	—
1956–57	Cincinnati Mohawks	IHL	8	5	5	10	2	—	—	—	—	—
1957–58	Montreal Canadiens	NHL	5	0	0	0	0	—	—	—	—	—
1957–58	Shawinigan Falls Catarates	QSHL	52	26	27	53	45	—	—	—	—	—
1957–58	Rochester Americans	AHL	14	7	6	13	10	—	—	—	—	—
1958–59	Detroit Red Wings	NHL	57	2	5	7	18	—	—	—	—	—
1958–59	Hershey Bears	AHL	10	4	5	9	16	—	—	—	—	—
1959–60	Hershey Bears	AHL	68	27	31	58	38	—	—	—	—	—
1960–61	Detroit Red Wings	NHL	10	1	0	1	2	—	—	—	—	—
1960–61	Hershey Bears	AHL	49	20	30	50	55	8	2	1	3	35
1961–62	Detroit Red Wings	NHL	38	10	9	19	20	—	—	—	—	—
1961–62	Hershey Bears	AHL	31	13	13	26	59	—	—	—	—	—
1962–63	Pittsburgh Hornets	AHL	50	10	23	33	73	—	—	—	—	—
1963–64	Detroit Red Wings	NHL	17	2	3	5	4	—	—	—	—	—
1963–64	Pittsburgh Hornets	AHL	51	19	23	42	59	5	1	3	4	4
1964–65	Detroit Red Wings	NHL	1	0	0	0	2	—	—	—	—	—
1964–65	Pittsburgh Hornets	AHL	67	23	32	55	26	4	4	2	6	2
1965–66	Pittsburgh Hornets	AHL	55	11	20	31	38	—	—	—	—	—
1965–66	Quebec Aces	AHL	9	2	6	8	0	—	—	—	—	—
1966–67	Quebec Aces	AHL	60	16	25	41	46	5	4	2	6	0
1967–68	Philadelphia Flyers	NHL	63	9	16	25	36	5	1	2	3	15
1967–68	Quebec Aces	AHL	8	5	4	9	2	—	—	—	—	—
1968–69	Philadelphia Flyers	NHL	2	0	0	0	0	—	—	—	—	—
1968–69	Quebec Aces	AHL	57	21	31	52	24	11	0	7	7	2
1969–70	Quebec Aces	AHL	72	28	39	67	44	6	0	2	2	6
1970–71	Denver Spurs	WHL	64	25	28	53	34	5	2	3	5	4
1971–72	Denver Spurs	WHL	56	15	31	46	12	9	1	5	6	6
1972–73	Denver Spurs	WHL	25	8	11	19	12	—	—	—	—	—
AHL totals			601	206	288	494	490	39	11	17	28	49
NHL totals			193	24	33	57	82	5	1	2	3	15
