= Bob Courcy =

Canadian ice hockey player

- Born: January 4, 1936 (age 89); Granby, Quebec, Canada
- Height: 5 ft 11 in (180 cm)
- Weight: 170 lb (77 kg; 12 st 2 lb)
- Position: Centre
- Shot: Right
- Played for: Buffalo Bisons; Quebec Aces; Cleveland Barons; Seattle Totems; San Diego Gulls
- Playing career: 1956–1974

Robert Courcy (born January 4, 1936) is a Canadian former professional ice hockey centre. Although he never played in the National Hockey League (NHL), he spent several seasons in the American Hockey League (AHL) and Western Hockey League (WHL). Drafted by the Philadelphia Flyers in the 1967 NHL Expansion Draft from the Montreal Canadiens, he was the only player out of the 20 drafted by the Flyers not to play for them.

== Awards and honours ==
Award	Year
EPHL First All-Star Team	1959–60

== Career statistics ==
			Regular season					Playoffs
Season	Team	League	GP	G	A	Pts	PIM	GP	G	A	Pts	PIM
1953–54	Montreal Junior Canadiens	QPJHL	6	1	0	1	0	—	—	—	—	—
1954–55	Montreal Junior Canadiens	QPJHL	23	5	3	8	6	—	—	—	—	—
1955–56	Montreal Junior Canadiens	Ind	—	—	—	—	—	—	—	—	—	—
1956–57	Shawinigan-Falls Cataracts	QHL	21	2	1	3	0	—	—	—	—	—
1957–58	Chicoutimi Sagueneens	QHL	59	10	18	28	16	—	—	—	—	—
1958–59	Trois-Rivieres Lions	QHL	62	29	22	51	13	—	—	—	—	—
1959–60	Hull-Ottawa Canadiens	EPHL	70	46	56	102	71	7	5	4	9	19
1960–61	Buffalo Bisons	AHL	67	14	13	27	10	1	0	0	0	0
1961–62	Buffalo Bisons	AHL	20	5	5	10	5	—	—	—	—	—
1961–62	Sault Thunderbirds	EPHL	49	19	26	45	29	—	—	—	—	—
1962–63	Quebec Aces	AHL	11	0	5	5	0	—	—	—	—	—
1962–63	Hull-Ottawa Canadiens	EPHL	55	38	27	65	30	3	0	3	3	2
1963–64	Omaha Knights	CPHL	70	36	46	82	46	10	6	8	14	2
1964–65	Cleveland Barons	AHL	65	33	35	68	20	—	—	—	—	—
1965–66	Cleveland Barons	AHL	72	26	60	86	10	12	5	2	7	8
1966–67	Cleveland Barons	AHL	64	32	28	60	10	—	—	—	—	—
1967–68	Quebec Aces	AHL	23	6	15	21	2	—	—	—	—	—
1967–68	Seattle Totems	WHL	31	11	16	27	0	9	4	7	11	6
1968–69	Seattle Totems	WHL	74	43	26	69	7	4	1	0	1	2
1969–70	Seattle Totems	WHL	73	40	49	89	17	6	1	4	5	0
1970–71	San Diego Gulls	WHL	72	48	41	89	17	6	1	5	6	0
1971–72	San Diego Gulls	WHL	70	34	37	71	17	4	3	0	3	0
1972–73	San Diego Gulls	WHL	71	33	38	71	6	6	2	3	5	2
1973–74	San Diego Gulls	WHL	63	28	34	62	10	4	0	0	0	0
WHL totals			454	237	241	478	74	39	12	19	31	10
AHL totals			322	116	161	277	57	13	5	2	7	8
