= René Drolet =

Canadian ice hockey player

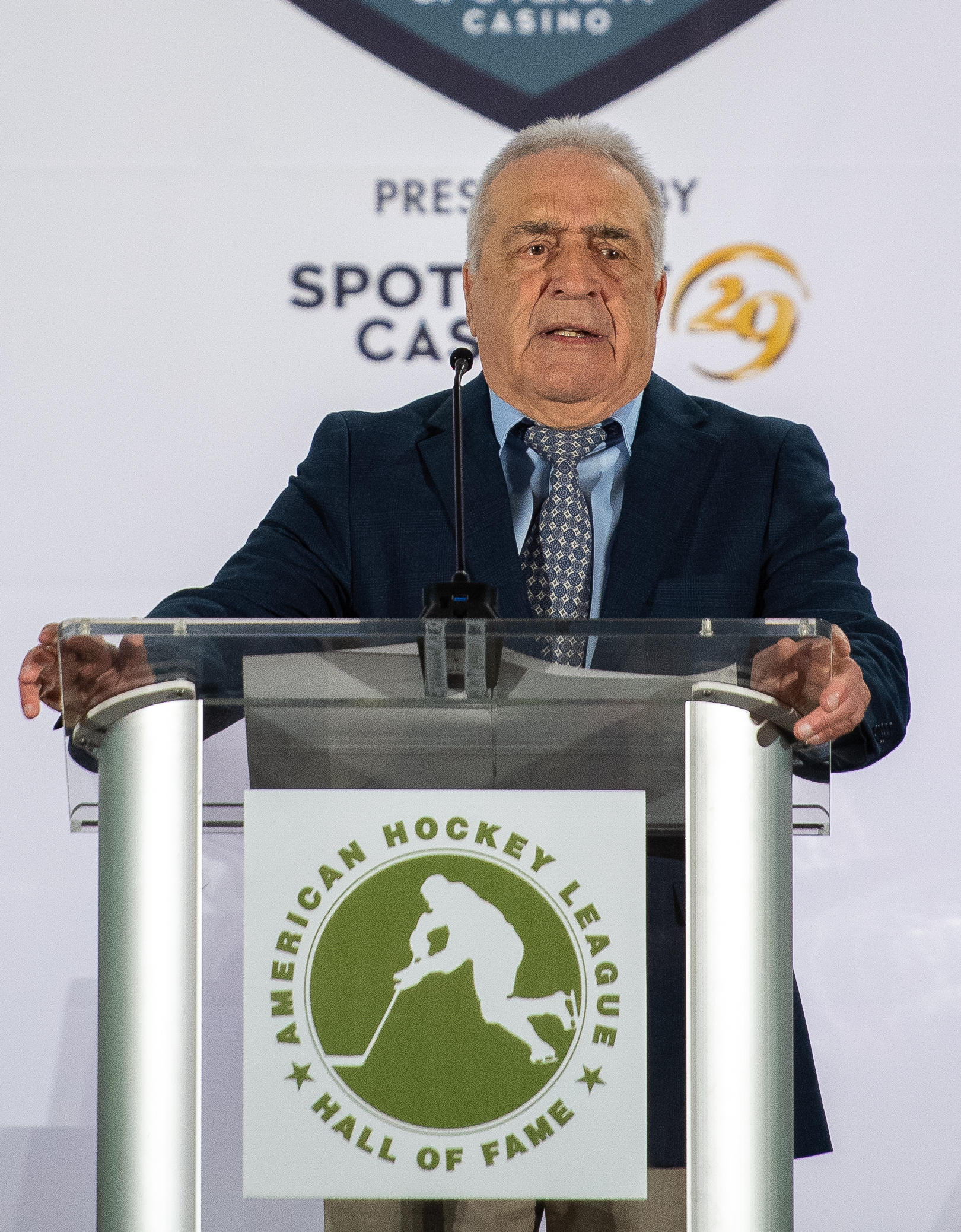
- Born: November 13, 1944 (age 80); Quebec City, Quebec, Canada
- Height: 5 ft 7 in (170 cm)
- Weight: 155 lb (70 kg; 11 st 1 lb)
- Position: Centre
- Shot: Right
- Played for: Philadelphia Flyers; Detroit Red Wings
- Playing career: 1963–1978

René Georges Drolet (born November 13, 1944) is a Canadian former professional ice hockey centre who played in two National Hockey League (NHL) games, one with the Philadelphia Flyers in 1972 and the other with the Detroit Red Wings in 1974. The rest of his career, which lasted from 1963 to 1978, was mainly spent in the American Hockey League.

== Playing career ==
Drolet was one of the leading scorers in American Hockey League history, totalling 298 goals and 443 assists for 741 points in 840 games with the Quebec Aces, Richmond Robins, Virginia Wings and Rochester Americans. He registered 10 consecutive 20-goal seasons in the AHL and was the league's leading scorer during the 1970s.

== Career statistics ==
=== Regular season and playoffs ===
			Regular season					Playoffs
Season	Team	League	GP	G	A	Pts	PIM	GP	G	A	Pts	PIM
1960–61	Quebec Citadelles	QPJHL	6	3	1	4	0	—	—	—	—	—
1961–62	Quebec Citadelles	QPJHL	50	49	49	98	8	10	6	5	11	2
1961–62	Quebec Citadelles	M-Cup	—	—	—	—	—	9	6	6	12	8
1962–63	Quebec Citadelles	QPJHL	45	52	54	106	47	12	9	12	21	7
1962–63	Quebec Aces	AHL	1	0	0	0	0	—	—	—	—	—
1963–64	Montreal Junior Canadiens	OHA	34	13	19	32	0	5	2	6	8	4
1964–65	Montreal Junior Canadiens	OHA	56	35	39	74	0	7	1	4	5	6
1964–65	Quebec Aces	AHL	3	0	1	1	6	—	—	—	—	—
1965–66	Muskegon Mohawks	IHL	68	42	53	95	24	4	2	1	3	2
1965–66	Quebec Aces	AHL	1	0	0	0	0	—	—	—	—	—
1966–67	Quebec Aces	AHL	48	6	7	13	0	5	0	0	0	2
1967–68	Quebec Aces	AHL	61	18	22	40	6	15	6	8	14	2
1968–69	Quebec Aces	AHL	61	30	42	72	14	15	4	10	14	28
1969–70	Quebec Aces	AHL	71	32	48	80	42	6	2	1	3	2
1970–71	Quebec Aces	AHL	72	20	37	57	26	1	1	1	2	0
1971–72	Richmond Robins	AHL	74	31	30	61	18	—	—	—	—	—
1971–72	Philadelphia Flyers	NHL	1	0	0	0	0	—	—	—	—	—
1972–73	Richmond Robins	AHL	76	34	53	87	30	4	2	1	3	0
1973–74	Richmond Robins	AHL	76	26	47	73	18	5	5	2	7	2
1974–75	Virginia Wings	AHL	72	26	52	78	36	5	1	3	4	2
1974–75	Detroit Red Wings	NHL	1	0	0	0	0	—	—	—	—	—
1975–76	Rochester Americans	AHL	74	23	40	63	42	7	0	1	1	0
1976–77	Rochester Americans	AHL	80	28	37	65	42	12	5	4	9	4
1977–78	Rochester Americans	AHL	70	24	27	51	20	6	5	1	6	2
AHL totals			840	298	443	741	300	81	31	32	63	44
NHL totals			2	0	0	0	0	—	—	—	—	—
