= Roger Pelletier =

Canadian ice hockey player

- Born: June 22, 1945 Montreal, Quebec, Canada
- Died: September 7, 2026 (aged 81) Quebec City, Quebec, Canada
- Height: 5 ft 11 in (180 cm)
- Weight: 185 lb (84 kg; 13 st 3 lb)
- Position: Defence
- Shot: Right
- Played for: Philadelphia Flyers
- Playing career: 1965–1974

Joseph Georges Roger Pelletier (June 22, 1945 – September 7, 2026) was a Canadian former professional ice hockey player. He played one game in the National Hockey League for the Philadelphia Flyers during the 1967–68 season.

Pelletier was born in Montreal, Quebec. He played junior hockey with the Quebec Citadelles, the Quebec Aces junior team, and Thetford Mines Aces. He joined the Quebec Aces for a game in 1965–66, then played full-time for the Aces in 1966–67. Pelletier played for Quebec until 1970, when he joined the Richmond Robins. He played for Richmond until February 1974 when he was traded to the Springfield Kings. Pelletier died in Quebec City on September 7, 2026 aged 81.

== Career statistics ==
=== Regular season and playoffs ===
			Regular season					Playoffs
Season	Team	League	GP	G	A	Pts	PIM	GP	G	A	Pts	PIM
1962–63	Quebec Citadelles	QPJHL	—	1	9	10	83	10	0	3	3	12
1963–64	Quebec Citadelles	QPJHL	25	1	6	7	108	7	0	1	1	15
1964–65	Quebec Citadelles	QPJHL	5	0	0	0	14	5	0	0	0	14
1965–66	Thetford Mines Aces	QJAHL	38	7	17	24	266	12	2	2	4	54
1965–66	Quebec Aces	AHL	1	0	1	1	0	—	—	—	—	—
1966–67	Quebec Aces	AHL	31	0	1	1	24	3	0	0	0	4
1967–68	Philadelphia Flyers	NHL	1	0	0	0	0	—	—	—	—	—
1967–68	Quebec Aces	AHL	56	5	8	13	42	15	0	0	0	8
1968–69	Quebec Aces	AHL	64	2	14	16	66	4	0	0	0	6
1969–70	Quebec Aces	AHL	44	3	4	7	26	6	0	0	0	2
1970–71	Quebec Aces	AHL	71	3	14	17	123	1	0	0	0	0
1971–72	Richmond Robins	AHL	58	5	11	16	62	—	—	—	—	—
1972–73	Richmond Robins	AHL	76	6	18	24	93	4	1	0	1	6
1973–74	Richmond Robins	AHL	41	1	7	8	49	—	—	—	—	—
1973–74	Springfield Kings	AHL	26	1	12	13	37	—	—	—	—	—
NHL totals			1	0	0	0	0	—	—	—	—	—
AHL totals			468	26	90	116	522	33	1	0	1	26

== See also ==
- List of players who played only one game in the NHL
