= John Miszuk =

Canadian ice hockey player (1940–2025)

- Born: September 29, 1940 Nalibaki, Byelorussian SSR, Soviet Union
- Died: July 28, 2025 (aged 84) Hamilton, Ontario, Canada
- Height: 6 ft 2 in (188 cm)
- Weight: 200 lb (91 kg; 14 st 4 lb)
- Position: Defence
- Shot: Left
- Played for: Detroit Red Wings; Chicago Black Hawks; Philadelphia Flyers; Minnesota North Stars; Michigan Stags/Baltimore Blades; Calgary Cowboys
- Playing career: 1961–1979

John Stanley Miszuk (born Jan Miszuk; September 29, 1940 – July 28, 2025) was a Canadian professional ice hockey defenceman who played in the National Hockey League (NHL) for the Detroit Red Wings, Chicago Black Hawks, Philadelphia Flyers and Minnesota North Stars between 1963 and 1970. He also played in the World Hockey Association (WHA) for the Michigan Stags/Baltimore Blades and Calgary Cowboys between 1974 and 1977.

== Playing career ==
Miszuk was born in the Polish village of Nalibaki, which had been annexed into the Byelorussian SSR of Soviet Union during the Second World War. The family moved to Canada and he grew up in Hamilton, Ontario where he began playing hockey in the Ontario Hockey League (OHL). After a season with the Hamilton Red Wings, Miszuk turned professional and joined the Detroit Red Wings organization.

After playing in the Western Hockey League (WHL) and the American Hockey League (AHL) Miszuk moved up to the National Hockey League (NHL) with Detroit in 1963–64. At the end of that season, he moved to the Chicago Black Hawks, but in the following three years, he played only eight NHL games, spending most of his time in the minor leagues.

In the summer of 1967, Miszuk was chosen during NHL expansion draft by the Philadelphia Flyers, one of the six new franchises in the NHL. With the Flyers he found a place in NHL and he played two full seasons and then was traded to the Minnesota North Stars for Wayne Hillman.

He eventually moved to the World Hockey Association (WHA) with the Michigan Stags. At the end of his career, Miszuk returned to the minor leagues, spending two seasons in the Pacific Hockey League (PHL) before retiring from competitive hockey.

== Personal life and death ==
Miszuk was married to Cora for 63 years and had two daughters and two sons. He died on July 28, 2025, at the age of 84.

== Career statistics ==
=== Regular season and playoffs ===
			Regular season					Playoffs
Season	Team	League	GP	G	A	Pts	PIM	GP	G	A	Pts	PIM
1957–58	Hamilton Tiger Cubs	OHA	—	—	—	—	—	1	0	0	0	0
1958–59	Hamilton Tiger Cubs	OHA	2	0	0	0	0	—	—	—	—	—
1959–60	Hamilton Tiger Cubs	OHA	6	1	3	4	0	—	—	—	—	—
1960–61	Hamilton Red Wings	OHA	48	6	19	25	89	12	1	8	9	28
1961–62	Edmonton Flyers	WHL	65	4	30	34	88	12	1	6	7	20
1962–63	Edmonton Flyers	WHL	59	8	25	33	99	3	0	0	0	8
1962–63	Pittsburgh Hornets	AHL	10	0	3	3	16	—	—	—	—	—
1963–64	Pittsburgh Hornets	AHL	25	1	7	8	34	—	—	—	—	—
1963–64	Detroit Red Wings	NHL	42	0	2	2	30	3	0	0	0	2
1964–65	Buffalo Bisons	AHL	71	9	46	55	100	9	0	3	3	12
1965–66	St. Louis Braves	CHL	69	7	29	36	116	5	0	2	2	4
1965–66	Chicago Black Hawks	NHL	2	1	1	2	2	3	0	0	0	4
1966–67	St. Louis Braves	CHL	68	3	28	31	104	—	—	—	—	—
1966–67	Chicago Black Hawks	NHL	3	0	0	0	0	2	0	0	0	2
1967–68	Philadelphia Flyers	NHL	74	5	17	22	79	7	0	3	3	11
1968–69	Philadelphia Flyers	NHL	66	1	13	14	70	4	0	0	0	0
1969–70	Iowa Stars	CHL	16	1	6	7	37	9	0	3	3	10
1969–70	Minnesota North Stars	NHL	50	0	6	6	51	—	—	—	—	—
1970–71	San Diego Gulls	WHL	72	5	30	35	98	6	0	1	1	4
1971–72	San Diego Gulls	WHL	72	5	33	38	118	4	0	1	1	6
1972–73	San Diego Gulls	WHL	72	2	39	41	85	6	0	4	4	13
1973–74	San Diego Gulls	WHL	77	8	49	57	103	4	0	0	0	2
1974–75	Michigan Stags/Baltimore Blades	WHA	66	2	19	21	56	—	—	—	—	—
1975–76	Calgary Cowboys	WHA	69	2	21	23	66	10	1	0	1	28
1976–77	Calgary Cowboys	WHA	79	2	26	28	57	—	—	—	—	—
1977–78	San Francisco Shamrocks	PHL	10	0	15	15	12	—	—	—	—	—
1978–79	San Diego Hawks	PHL	25	2	11	13	24	—	—	—	—	—
WHA totals			214	6	66	72	179	10	1	0	1	28
NHL totals			237	7	39	46	232	19	0	3	3	19
