= Wayne Hicks =

American-born Canadian ice hockey player (born 1937)

- Born: April 9, 1937 (age 89) Aberdeen, Washington, U.S.
- Height: 5 ft 11 in (180 cm)
- Weight: 185 lb (84 kg; 13 st 3 lb)
- Position: Right wing
- Shot: Right
- Played for: Chicago Black Hawks; Boston Bruins; Montreal Canadiens; Pittsburgh Penguins; Philadelphia Flyers
- Playing career: 1960–1974

Wayne Wilson Hicks (born April 9, 1937) is an American-born Canadian former professional ice hockey right winger who played in the National Hockey League (NHL) with the Chicago Black Hawks, Boston Bruins, Montreal Canadiens, Pittsburgh Penguins and Philadelphia Flyers.

Hicks was born in Aberdeen, Washington and raised in Kelowna, British Columbia.

Hicks played one game for Chicago in the 1961 Stanley Cup Final, helping them win the Stanley Cup.

Hicks has the distinction of being the first American-born player to play for the Philadelphia Flyers and was part of the team's starting lineup for the opening shift against the California Golden Seals in the franchise's inaugural regular-season game on October 11, 1967.

Hicks scored the first goal at the renovated Madison Square Garden on February 18, 1968.

Hicks is the father of Alex Hicks, who also played for the Pittsburgh Penguins. When Alex had his first game for the Penguins, it marked the first time a father and son played for the Penguins franchise.

== Awards ==
- Stanley Cup champion, Chicago Black Hawks (1961)
- Inducted to Central Okanagan Sports Hall of Fame, 2015

== Career statistics ==
=== Regular season and playoffs ===
| | | | Regular season | | | | | Playoffs |
| Season | Team | League | GP | G | A | Pts | PIM | GP | G | A | Pts | PIM |
|---|---|---|---|---|---|---|---|---|---|---|---|---|
| 1954–55 | Moose Jaw Canucks | WCJHL | — | — | — | — | — | — | — | — | — | — |
| 1956–57 | Calgary Stampeders | WHL | 4 | 0 | 0 | 0 | 0 | — | — | — | — | — |
| 1956–57 | Melville Millionaires | SJHL | — | — | — | — | — | — | — | — | — | — |
| 1957–58 | Calgary Stampeders | WHL | 60 | 7 | 14 | 21 | 19 | 14 | 0 | 1 | 1 | 6 |
| 1958–59 | Calgary Stampeders | WHL | 64 | 15 | 20 | 35 | 41 | 8 | 1 | 2 | 3 | 5 |
| 1959–60 | Sault Ste. Marie Thunderbirds | EPHL | 69 | 30 | 47 | 77 | 64 | — | — | — | — | — |
| 1959–60 | Chicago Black Hawks | NHL | — | — | — | — | — | 1 | 0 | 1 | 1 | 0 |
| 1960–61 | Chicago Black Hawks | NHL | 1 | 0 | 0 | 0 | 0 | 1 | 0 | 0 | 0 | 2 |
| 1960–61 | Buffalo Bisons | AHL | 72 | 20 | 35 | 55 | 57 | 4 | 2 | 2 | 4 | 6 |
| 1961–62 | Buffalo Bisons | AHL | 70 | 22 | 42 | 64 | 74 | 11 | 3 | 3 | 6 | 8 |
| 1961–62 | Calgary Stampeders | WHL | 4 | 1 | 0 | 1 | 0 | — | — | — | — | — |
| 1962–63 | Boston Bruins | NHL | 65 | 7 | 9 | 16 | 14 | — | — | — | — | — |
| 1963–64 | Montreal Canadiens | NHL | 2 | 0 | 0 | 0 | 0 | — | — | — | — | — |
| 1963–64 | Quebec Aces | AHL | 70 | 36 | 42 | 78 | 30 | 9 | 4 | 2 | 6 | 12 |
| 1964–65 | Quebec Aces | AHL | 72 | 38 | 47 | 85 | 52 | 5 | 1 | 0 | 1 | 2 |
| 1965–66 | Quebec Aces | AHL | 72 | 32 | 49 | 81 | 24 | 6 | 0 | 0 | 0 | 0 |
| 1966–67 | Quebec Aces | AHL | 72 | 31 | 60 | 91 | 34 | 5 | 1 | 2 | 3 | 2 |
| 1967–68 | Philadelphia Flyers | NHL | 32 | 2 | 7 | 9 | 6 | — | — | — | — | — |
| 1967–68 | Quebec Aces | AHL | 13 | 4 | 9 | 13 | 13 | — | — | — | — | — |
| 1967–68 | Pittsburgh Penguins | NHL | 15 | 4 | 7 | 11 | 2 | — | — | — | — | — |
| 1968–69 | Baltimore Clippers | AHL | 65 | 33 | 36 | 69 | 55 | — | — | — | — | — |
| 1969–70 | Baltimore Clippers | AHL | 64 | 14 | 21 | 35 | 58 | 3 | 0 | 0 | 0 | 0 |
| 1970–71 | Salt Lake Golden Eagles | WHL | 8 | 1 | 3 | 4 | 5 | — | — | — | — | — |
| 1970–71 | Phoenix Roadrunners | WHL | 67 | 29 | 32 | 61 | 36 | 10 | 1 | 8 | 9 | 2 |
| 1971–72 | Phoenix Roadrunners | WHL | 69 | 17 | 31 | 48 | 59 | 6 | 3 | 3 | 6 | 2 |
| 1972–73 | Phoenix Roadrunners | WHL | 67 | 17 | 33 | 50 | 31 | 10 | 4 | 12 | 16 | 4 |
| 1973–74 | Phoenix Roadrunners | WHL | 72 | 27 | 32 | 59 | 23 | 9 | 4 | 5 | 9 | 4 |
| AHL totals | | | 570 | 230 | 341 | 571 | 397 | 43 | 11 | 9 | 20 | 30 |
| WHL totals | | | 415 | 114 | 165 | 279 | 214 | 57 | 13 | 31 | 44 | 23 |
| NHL totals | | | 115 | 13 | 23 | 36 | 22 | 2 | 0 | 1 | 1 | 2 |

== Transactions ==
- May 30, 1962: Traded from Chicago Black Hawks to Montreal Canadiens for Al MacNeil.
- June 5, 1962: Claimed by Boston Bruins from Montreal in Intra-League Draft.
- September 28, 1963: Traded from Boston Bruins to Montreal Canadiens for cash.
- May 8, 1967: Transferred from Quebec Aces to Philadelphia Flyers
- February 27, 1968: Traded from Philadelphia Flyers to Pittsburgh Penguins for Art Stratton.
- November, 1970: Traded from Salt Lake Golden Eagles to Phoenix Roadrunners for Rick Charron.
