= Pat Hannigan =

Canadian ice hockey player

- Born: March 5, 1936; Timmins, Ontario, Canada
- Died: December 11, 2007 (aged 71); Welland, Ontario, Canada
- Height: 5 ft 10 in (178 cm)
- Weight: 183 lb (83 kg; 13 st 1 lb)
- Position: Left wing
- Shot: Left
- Played for: Toronto Maple Leafs; New York Rangers; Philadelphia Flyers
- Playing career: 1956–1971

Patrick Edward Hannigan (March 5, 1936 – December 11, 2007) was a Canadian professional ice hockey left winger who played five seasons in the National Hockey League (NHL) with the Toronto Maple Leafs, New York Rangers and Philadelphia Flyers between 1959 and 1968. He later served as a television analyst for the Buffalo Sabres, where he was paired with Ted Darling, until his retirement from broadcasting in 1982.

Pat is the brother of Ray and Gord Hannigan and Colleen Yates. He was married to the former Lynn McCormick and had daughter Carey, and two sons, Ted and Bill.

== Career statistics ==
=== Regular season and playoffs ===
			Regular season					Playoffs
Season	Team	League	GP	G	A	Pts	PIM	GP	G	A	Pts	PIM
1953–54	Schumacher Lions	NOHA	—	—	—	—	—	—	—	—	—	—
1953–54	St. Michael's Majors	OHA	20	1	2	3	17	1	0	0	0	0
1954–55	St. Michael's Majors	OHA	44	13	19	32	40	5	2	3	5	2
1955–56	St. Michael's Majors	OHA	46	38	31	69	121	8	5	8	13	2
1956–57	Winnipeg Warriors	WHL	67	12	19	31	82	—	—	—	—	—
1957–58	New Westminster Royals	WHL	52	26	28	54	67	4	1	0	1	2
1957–58	Rochester Americans	AHL	8	0	4	4	4	—	—	—	—	—
1958–59	New Westminster Royals	WHL	69	37	46	83	73	—	—	—	—	—
1958–59	Rochester Americans	AHL	—	—	—	—	—	4	0	1	1	0
1959–60	Toronto Maple Leafs	NHL	1	0	0	0	0	—	—	—	—	—
1959–60	Rochester Americans	AHL	65	29	33	62	91	11	4	6	10	14
1960–61	New York Rangers	NHL	53	11	9	20	24	—	—	—	—	—
1960–61	Rochester Americas	AHL	13	5	6	11	4	—	—	—	—	—
1961–62	New York Rangers	NHL	56	8	14	22	34	4	0	0	0	2
1962–63	Baltimore Clippers	AHL	40	16	20	36	35	—	—	—	—	—
1963–64	Portland Buckaroos	WHL	34	12	8	20	43	—	—	—	—	—
1963–64	Buffalo Bisons	AHL	40	9	24	33	20	—	—	—	—	—
1964–65	Buffalo Bisons	AHL	72	38	54	92	118	9	3	4	7	23
1965–66	Buffalo Bisons	AHL	66	21	43	64	69	—	—	—	—	—
1966–67	Buffalo Bisons	AHL	68	18	38	56	37	—	—	—	—	—
1967–68	Philadelphia Flyers	NHL	65	11	15	26	36	7	1	2	3	9
1968–69	Philadelphia Flyers	NHL	7	0	1	1	22	—	—	—	—	—
1968–69	Buffalo Bisons	AHL	31	14	25	39	37	—	—	—	—	—
1968–69	Vancouver Canucks	WHL	12	4	4	8	2	6	4	1	5	4
1969–70	Vancouver Canucks	WHL	69	28	42	70	47	—	—	—	—	—
1970–71	Phoenix Roadrunners	WHL	10	1	2	3	0	—	—	—	—	—
AHL totals			403	150	247	397	415	24	7	11	18	37
WHL totals			313	120	149	269	314	10	5	1	6	6
NHL totals			182	30	39	69	116	11	1	2	3	1

== Awards ==
- WHL Coast Division First All-Star Team (1959)
- AHL First All-Star Team (1965)
