= Don Blackburn =

Canadian ice hockey player (1938–2023)

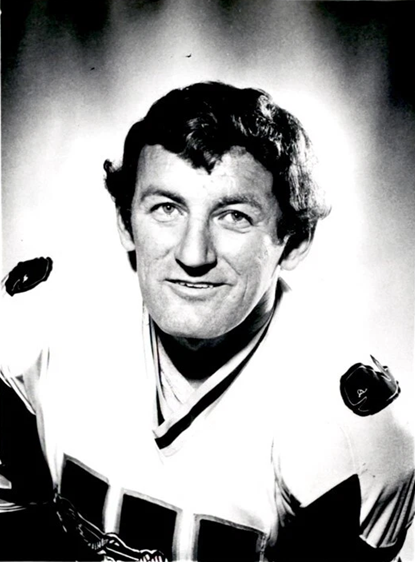
- Blackburn in 1973 photo
- Born: May 14, 1938 Kirkland Lake, Ontario, Canada
- Died: February 4, 2023 (aged 84) Sarasota, Florida, U.S.
- Height: 6 ft 0 in (183 cm)
- Weight: 175 lb (79 kg; 12 st 7 lb)
- Position: Left wing
- Shot: Left
- Played for: Boston Bruins; Philadelphia Flyers; New York Rangers; New York Islanders; Minnesota North Stars; New England Whalers
- Playing career: 1959–1976

John Donald Blackburn (May 14, 1938 – February 4, 2023) was a Canadian professional ice hockey player who was a left winger in the National Hockey League (NHL) with the Boston Bruins, Philadelphia Flyers, New York Rangers, New York Islanders and Minnesota North Stars. He also played in the World Hockey Association (WHA) with the New England Whalers. After retiring in 1976 he became a coach with the Whalers, and remained in that position through 1981, serving as their first coach when they joined the NHL in 1979 as the Hartford Whalers.

== Playing career ==
Except for a six-game stint with the Boston Bruins, Blackburn spent the majority of the early portion of his career with various minor league teams. He was a dominant force with the Quebec Aces of the AHL during the mid-1960s, including a 36-goal performance in 1965–66. He was selected by the Philadelphia Flyers in the NHL expansion draft and was a regular contributor during the first two years of the fledgling team's existence. In the 1968 Stanley Cup playoffs, Blackburn scored three goals for the Flyers, with his goal in Game 6 of the Quarterfinals against the St. Louis Blues being the first playoff overtime goal in Flyers history. In 1969, he was traded to the New York Rangers, but he played sparingly in two years with the team. He was claimed by the New York Islanders in the 1972 expansion draft, but was traded to the Minnesota North Stars late in the season. He finished his career with three seasons with the WHA's Whalers, scoring 59 points in 1973–74.

== Coaching career ==
On December 26, 1975, Blackburn became coach of the New England Whalers when Jack Kelley resigned as general manager/coach to the acceptance of general partner Howard Baldwin (Kelley did not leave coaching for long, as he accepted the position at Colby College to begin in June of 1976). Blackburn won seven of his first nine games (which included his first game on the 26th by a score of 4–3 over the Cincinnati Stingers) before hitting a slump that saw him go 14–18–3 before he resigned from his position on March 11 (with just twelve games remaining) which saw him replaced by Harry Neale, who had been coaching the Minnesota Fighting Saints before the team went under. Afterwards, Blackburn served as an assistant coach.

On April 1, 1979, near the end of the 1978-79 WHA season, Blackburn, by then the head scout of the Whalers, was appointed with nine games remaining to replace Bill Dineen as head coach. He went 4-5-0 and led the team as they competed in the 1979 WHA playoffs, where they won the first round matchup against Cincinnati before falling to the Edmonton Oilers in seven games. After the end of the season, the team rebranded itself as the "Hartford Whalers" and Blackburn was retained as coach. He led them to a 27–34–19 record in the 1979–80 NHL season. In the playoffs, the Whalers were swept by Montreal in three games. On February 20, 1981, with the Whalers having won just two of their last 25 games with a record of 15–29–16, Blackburn was fired by the Whalers and was replaced on an interim basis by assistant coach Larry Pleau that director of operations Jack Kelley said was due to "a lack of success and obvious frustration that has been building up within the club".

== Career statistics ==
=== Regular season and playoffs ===
			Regular season					Playoffs
Season	Team	League	GP	G	A	Pts	PIM	GP	G	A	Pts	PIM
1956–57	Hamilton Tiger Cubs	OHA	52	9	8	17	17	4	0	2	2	0
1957–58	Hamilton Tiger Cubs	OHA	52	15	18	33	37	15	4	3	7	16
1958–69	Vancouver Canucks	WHL	50	15	16	31	14	—	—	—	—	—
1959–60	Vancouver Canucks	WHL	41	8	7	15	8	11	1	1	2	2
1959–60	Providence Reds	AHL	16	1	1	2	8	—	—	—	—	—
1960–61	Kingston Frontenacs	EPHL	59	14	31	45	27	5	1	0	1	0
1961–62	Kingston Frontenacs	EPHL	51	13	24	37	30	11	2	12	14	5
1962–63	Boston Bruins	NHL	6	0	5	5	4	—	—	—	—	—
1962–63	Kingston Frontenacs	EPHL	67	42	54	96	22	5	4	4	8	0
1963–64	Quebec Aces	AHL	63	19	19	38	39	9	1	1	2	9
1964–65	Quebec Aces	AHL	70	20	42	62	34	5	0	2	2	0
1965–66	Quebec Aces	AHL	72	36	42	78	51	6	1	4	5	4
1966–67	Rochester Americans	AHL	70	20	37	57	24	13	3	3	6	10
1967–68	Philadelphia Flyers	NHL	67	9	20	29	23	7	3	0	3	8
1968–69	Philadelphia Flyers	NHL	48	7	9	16	36	4	0	0	0	2
1968–69	Baltimore Clippers	AHL	12	6	13	19	10	—	—	—	—	—
1969–70	New York Rangers	NHL	3	0	0	0	0	1	0	0	0	0
1969–70	Buffalo Bisons	AHL	68	27	44	71	40	13	5	7	12	6
1970–71	Rochester Americans	AHL	62	25	44	69	22	—	—	—	—	—
1970–71	New York Rangers	NHL	1	0	0	0	0	—	—	—	—	—
1971–72	Providence Reds	AHL	76	34	65	99	12	5	1	3	4	2
1972–73	New York Islanders	NHL	56	7	10	17	20	—	—	—	—	—
1972–73	Minnesota North Stars	NHL	4	0	0	0	4	—	—	—	—	—
1973–74	New England Whalers	WHA	75	20	39	59	18	7	2	4	6	4
1974–75	New England Whalers	WHA	50	18	32	50	16	5	1	2	3	2
1974–75	Cape Codders	NAHL	2	2	2	4	0	—	—	—	—	—
1975–76	New England Whalers	WHA	21	2	3	5	6	—	—	—	—	—
1975–76	Cape Codders	NAHL	8	4	4	8	0	—	—	—	—	—
WHA totals			146	40	74	114	40	12	3	6	9	6
NHL totals			185	23	44	67	87	12	3	0	3	10

== NHL coaching record ==
Team	Year	Regular season						Post season
Team	Year	G	W	L	T	Pts	Finish	Result
New England Whalers (WHA)	1975–76	35	14	18	3	(31)	3rd in East	(interim coach)
New England Whalers (WHA)	1978–79	9	4	5	0	(8)	4th in WHA	Lost in semi-finals
Hartford Whalers (NHL)	1979–80	80	27	34	19	73	4th in Norris	Lost in preliminary round
Hartford Whalers (NHL)	1980–81	60	15	29	6	(46)	4th in Norris	(fired)
NHL Total		140	42	63	25			

== Personal life ==
Blackburn died in Sarasota, Florida, on February 4, 2023.

Preceded by Jack Kelley	Head coach of the Hartford Whalers; 1975–76	Succeeded by Harry Neale
Preceded by Bill Dineen	Head coach of the New England/Hartford Whalers; 1979–80	Succeeded by Larry Pleau
