= Fran Huck =

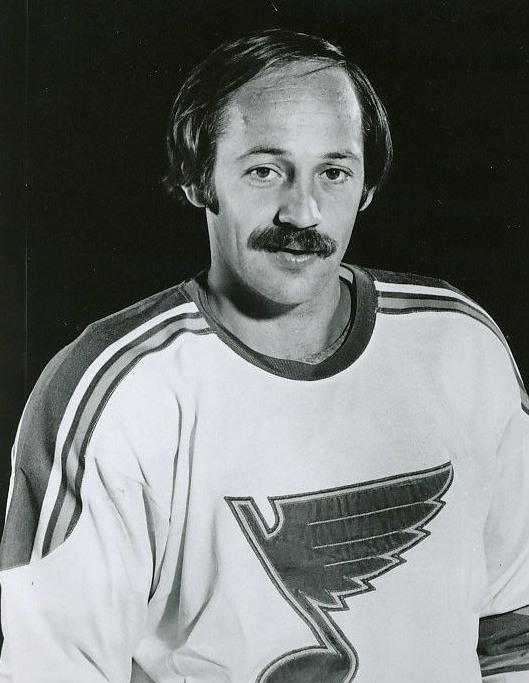
- Born: December 4, 1945 (age 80) Regina, Saskatchewan, Canada
- Height: 5 ft 7 in (170 cm)
- Weight: 165 lb (75 kg; 11 st 11 lb)
- Position: Centre
- Shot: Left
- Played for: Montreal Canadiens; St. Louis Blues; Winnipeg Jets; Minnesota Fighting Saints; ZSC Lions
- National team: Canada
- Playing career: 1969–1978

Medal record

Winter Olympics
Bronze medal – third place	1968 Grenoble	

World Championships
Bronze medal – third place	1966 Yugoslavia	
Bronze medal – third place	1967 Austria	

Anthony Francis Huck (born December 4, 1945) is a Canadian former ice hockey player. Huck played professionally in both the National Hockey League (NHL) and World Hockey Association (WHA) between 1970 and 1978. However, his greatest contributions may have been with the Canadian national team during years before NHL players were allowed to compete internationally. His amateur career peaked at the 1968 Winter Olympics where he helped the team win the bronze medal. In 1999, Huck was inducted into the IIHF Hall of Fame.

== Amateur career ==
Huck excelled in junior hockey with the Regina Pats. His achievements included winning the scoring title, making the all-star team and being named league MVP. After junior, Huck shocked many by joining the Canadian national team instead of the NHL. At the time the program, run by Father David Bauer, afforded hockey players the alternative of pursuing higher education while still playing hockey. Huck wanted to study law. He was with the national team from 1965 to 1969 winning the bronze medal at the 1968 Olympics and also bronze at the IIHF World Championships in 1966 and 1967.

== Professional career ==
After playing with the national team, Huck began his professional career with the Montreal Canadiens, followed by two seasons with the St. Louis Blues and the Western Hockey League's Denver Spurs. He then moved over to the WHA, joining the Winnipeg Jets and Minnesota Fighting Saints. In all, Huck played three seasons in the NHL and five in the WHA. He retired after the 1977-78 season.

== Personal life and post-hockey career ==
Huck graduated from the University of Manitoba with a law degree in 1970. Today he is a practicing lawyer in British Columbia. He is also senior partner in a firm which specializes in helping former athletes make the transition to life after their sporting career.

== Career statistics ==
=== Regular season and playoffs ===
			Regular season					Playoffs
Season	Team	League	GP	G	A	Pts	PIM	GP	G	A	Pts	PIM
1962–63	Regina Pats	SJHL	28	4	11	15	20	5	4	2	6	8
1963–64	Regina Pats	SJHL	62	86	67	153	104	19	22	18	40	60
1963–64	Estevan Bruins	M-Cup	—	—	—	—	—	5	3	0	3	4
1963–64	Edmonton Oil Kings	M-Cup	—	—	—	—	—	4	2	3	5	0
1964–65	Regina Pats	SJHL	56	77	59	136	36	12	10	13	23	18
1964–65	Edmonton Oil Kings	M-Cup	—	—	—	—	—	10	15	10	25	4
1965–66	Canadian National Team	Intl	—	—	—	—	—	—	—	—	—	—
1966–67	Canadian National Team	Intl	—	—	—	—	—	—	—	—	—	—
1967–68	Ottawa Nationals	OHA Sr	18	8	17	25	24	—	—	—	—	—
1968–69	Canadian National Team	Intl	—	—	—	—	—	—	—	—	—	—
1969–70	Canadian National Team	Intl	—	—	—	—	—	—	—	—	—	—
1969–70	Montreal Canadiens	NHL	2	0	0	0	0	—	—	—	—	—
1969–70	Montreal Voyageurs	AHL	2	1	2	3	0	—	—	—	—	—
1970–71	Montreal Canadiens	NHL	5	1	2	3	0	—	—	—	—	—
1970–71	Montreal Voyageurs	AHL	31	12	17	29	18	—	—	—	—	—
1970–71	St. Louis Blues	NHL	29	7	8	15	18	6	1	2	3	2
1971–72	Denver Spurs	WHL	72	28	63	91	83	9	9	4	13	16
1972–73	St. Louis Blues	NHL	58	16	20	36	20	5	2	2	4	0
1973–74	Winnipeg Jets	WHA	74	26	48	74	68	4	0	0	0	2
1974–75	Minnesota Fighting Saints	WHA	78	22	45	67	26	12	3	13	16	6
1975–76	Minnesota Fighting Saints	WHA	59	17	32	49	27	—	—	—	—	—
1976–77	Zürcher SC	NLB	—	—	—	—	—	—	—	—	—	—
1976–77	Winnipeg Jets	WHA	12	2	2	4	10	7	0	2	2	6
1977–78	Winnipeg Jets	WHA	5	0	0	0	2	—	—	—	—	—
WHA totals			228	67	127	194	133	23	3	15	18	4
NHL totals			94	24	30	54	38	11	3	4	7	2

=== International ===
Year	Team	Event	GP	G	A	Pts	PIM
1966	Canada	WC	7	4	4	8	8
1967	Canada	WC	7	5	6	11	6
1968	Canada	OLY	7	4	5	9	10
1969	Canada	WC	10	3	2	5	12
Junior totals			31	16	17	33	36

== Honours and awards ==
- Named to First All-Star Team 1966 and 1968 IIHF World Championships.
- Inducted International Ice Hockey Federation Hall of Fame in 1999
- WHL Most Valuable Player, 1971–72
- Inducted into the Saskatchewan Sports Hall of fame in 2006
