= Gerry Ehman =

Canadian ice hockey player

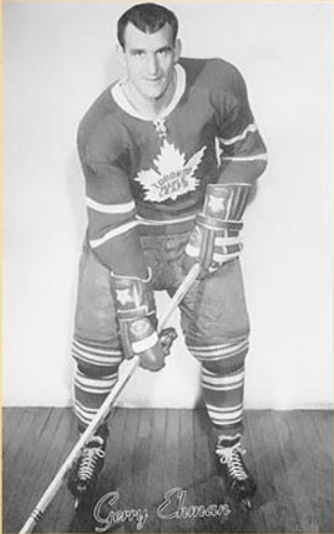
- Born: November 3, 1932 Cudworth, Saskatchewan, Canada
- Died: March 21, 2006 (aged 73)
- Height: 6 ft 0 in (183 cm)
- Weight: 175 lb (79 kg; 12 st 7 lb)
- Position: Right wing
- Shot: Left
- Played for: Boston Bruins; Detroit Red Wings; Toronto Maple Leafs; Oakland Seals/California Golden Seals
- Playing career: 1952–1971

Gerald Joseph Ehman (November 3, 1932 – March 21, 2006) was a Canadian ice hockey player. He played in the National Hockey League (NHL) for the Boston Bruins, Detroit Red Wings, Toronto Maple Leafs and the Oakland Seals/California Golden Seals between 1957 and 1971, and also spent several years in the minor American Hockey League, and other leagues. He won the Stanley Cup once as a player with Toronto in 1964. After retiring, he worked in executive positions for several years. He scouted for the New York Islanders during their dynasty, which led to his name being engraved on the Stanley Cup four straight times from 1980 to 1983.

== Playing career ==
Ehman played 429 regular season games in the NHL, scoring 96 goals and 118 assists for 214 points. He also played for various teams in the American Hockey League, Western Hockey League and the Quebec Hockey League. He was a four-time postseason All-Star selection and a two-time Calder Cup champion in the AHL.

Ehman died on March 21, 2006, of lung cancer.

== Career statistics ==
=== Regular season and playoffs ===
			Regular season					Playoffs
Season	Team	League	GP	G	A	Pts	PIM	GP	G	A	Pts	PIM
1951–52	Flin Flon Bombers	SJHL	50	40	42	82	18	14	5	11	16	0
1952–53	Edmonton Flyers	WHL	22	3	3	6	0	—	—	—	—	—
1952–53	St. Louis Flyers	AHL	39	3	1	4	8	—	—	—	—	—
1953–54	Sherbrooke Saints	QHL	65	13	21	34	29	5	0	2	2	0
1954–55	Quebec Aces	QHL	59	14	25	39	58	8	2	3	5	12
1955–56	Vancouver Canucks	WHL	15	5	7	12	6	15	9	2	11	14
1956–57	Springfield Indians	AHL	64	23	35	58	18	—	—	—	—	—
1957–58	Boston Bruins	NHL	1	1	0	1	0	—	—	—	—	—
1957–58	Springfield Indians	AHL	68	40	39	79	32	13	10	6	16	8
1958–59	Detroit Red Wings	NHL	6	0	1	1	4	—	—	—	—	—
1958–59	Hershey Bears	AHL	23	8	7	15	4	—	—	—	—	—
1958–59	Toronto Maple Leafs	NHL	38	12	13	25	12	12	6	7	13	8
1959–60	Toronto Maple Leafs	NHL	69	12	16	28	26	9	0	0	0	0
1960–61	Toronto Maple Leafs	NHL	14	1	1	2	2	—	—	—	—	—
1960–61	Rochester Americans	AHL	53	32	23	55	14	—	—	—	—	—
1961–62	Rochester Americans	AHL	66	29	37	66	26	2	1	1	2	0
1962–63	Rochester Americans	AHL	72	30	40	70	32	1	0	0	0	0
1963–64	Toronto Maple Leafs	NHL	4	1	1	2	0	9	1	0	1	4
1963–64	Rochester Americans	AHL	66	36	49	85	26	2	0	1	1	0
1964–65	Rochester Americans	AHL	70	38	49	87	20	10	2	5	7	10
1965–66	Rochester Americans	AHL	70	39	49	88	28	12	5	4	9	8
1966–67	Rochester Americans	AHL	68	33	36	69	27	13	2	7	9	6
1967–68	California/Oakland Seals	NHL	73	19	25	44	20	—	—	—	—	—
1968–69	Oakland Seals	NHL	70	21	24	45	12	7	2	2	4	0
1969–70	Oakland Seals	NHL	76	11	19	30	8	4	1	1	2	0
1970–71	California Golden Seals	NHL	78	18	18	36	16	—	—	—	—	—
AHL totals			659	311	365	676	235	53	20	24	44	32
NHL totals			429	96	118	214	100	41	10	10	20	12

== Awards and achievements ==
- AHL scoring champion (1963-64)
- 3x First Team AHL All-Star (1957-58, 1963-64, 1966-67)
- Second Team AHL All-Star (1960-61)
- Stanley Cup champion with Toronto (1964)
- 2x Calder Cup champion with Rochester (1965, 1966)
- 4x Stanley Cup champion with New York Islanders as scout/assistant GM (1980, 1981, 1982, 1983)
