= Ray LaRose =

Canadian ice hockey player

- Born: November 20, 1941 (age 84) Waterloo, Quebec, Canada
- Height: 6 ft 0 in (183 cm)
- Weight: 190 lb (86 kg; 13 st 8 lb)
- Position: Defence
- Shot: Left
- Played for: Houston Aeros; New York Golden Blades/Jersey Knights
- Playing career: 1962–1974

Raymond LaRose (born November 20, 1941) is a Canadian former professional ice hockey defenceman who played parts of two seasons in the World Hockey Association (WHA) for the Houston Aeros and New York Golden Blades/Jersey Knights.

== Career statistics ==
=== Regular season and playoffs ===
| | | | Regular season | | | | | Playoffs |
| Season | Team | League | GP | G | A | Pts | PIM | GP | G | A | Pts | PIM |
|---|---|---|---|---|---|---|---|---|---|---|---|---|
| 1961–62 | Quebec Citadelles | QPJHL | 27 | 5 | 15 | 20 | 62 | –– | –– | –– | –– | –– |
| 1962–63 | Long Island Ducks | EHL | 66 | 2 | 14 | 16 | 162 | –– | –– | –– | –– | –– |
| 1962–63 | Quebec Aces | AHL | 1 | 0 | 0 | 0 | 4 | –– | –– | –– | –– | –– |
| 1963–64 | Long Island Ducks | EHL | 65 | 8 | 25 | 33 | 183 | 5 | 1 | 2 | 3 | 22 |
| 1964–65 | St. Louis Braves | CPHL | 31 | 3 | 7 | 10 | 48 | –– | –– | –– | –– | –– |
| 1964–65 | Quebec Aces | AHL | 36 | 1 | 3 | 4 | 14 | 1 | 0 | 0 | 0 | 0 |
| 1965–66 | Quebec Aces | AHL | 9 | 0 | 0 | 0 | 8 | –– | –– | –– | –– | –– |
| 1965–66 | Los Angeles Blades | WHL | 53 | 8 | 13 | 21 | 64 | –– | –– | –– | –– | –– |
| 1966–67 | Quebec Aces | AHL | 63 | 0 | 10 | 10 | 63 | 4 | 1 | 1 | 2 | 2 |
| 1967–68 | Quebec Aces | AHL | 23 | 2 | 0 | 2 | 30 | –– | –– | –– | –– | –– |
| 1967–68 | Seattle Totems | WHL | 41 | 5 | 7 | 12 | 59 | 9 | 1 | 3 | 4 | 17 |
| 1968–69 | Seattle Totems | WHL | 74 | 9 | 18 | 27 | 98 | 4 | 0 | 1 | 1 | 0 |
| 1969–70 | Seattle Totems | WHL | 73 | 4 | 21 | 25 | 70 | 6 | 0 | 0 | 0 | 25 |
| 1970–71 | Denver Spurs | WHL | 67 | 1 | 13 | 14 | 66 | 5 | 0 | 1 | 1 | 8 |
| 1971–72 | Kansas City Blues | CHL | 2 | 0 | 2 | 2 | 4 | –– | –– | –– | –– | –– |
| 1971–72 | Denver Spurs | WHL | 65 | 12 | 23 | 35 | 63 | –– | –– | –– | –– | –– |
| 1972–73 | Houston Aeros | WHA | 68 | 1 | 10 | 11 | 25 | –– | –– | –– | –– | –– |
| 1973–74 | Syracuse Blazers | NAHL | 4 | 0 | 0 | 0 | 7 | –– | –– | –– | –– | –– |
| 1973–74 | New York Golden Blades/Jersey Knights | WHA | 18 | 0 | 1 | 1 | 20 | –– | –– | –– | –– | –– |
| WHA totals | | | 86 | 1 | 11 | 12 | 45 | — | — | — | — | — |
