= Ron Delorme =

Canadian ice hockey player and scout

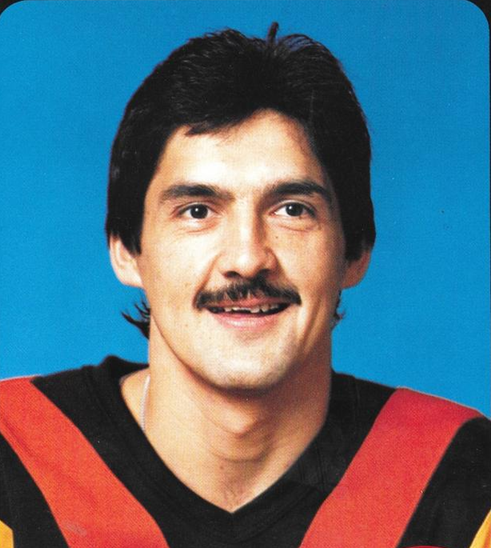
- Delorme in 1982 card
- Born: September 3, 1955 (age 70) North Battleford, Saskatchewan, Canada
- Height: 6 ft 2 in (188 cm)
- Weight: 185 lb (84 kg; 13 st 3 lb)
- Position: Right wing
- Shot: Right
- Played for: Denver Spurs/Ottawa Civics; Colorado Rockies; Vancouver Canucks
- NHL draft: 56th overall, 1975; Kansas City Scouts
- WHA draft: 34th overall, 1975; Denver Spurs
- Playing career: 1975–1985

Ronald Elmer "Chief" Delorme (born September 3, 1955) is a Canadian former professional ice hockey player and the chief amateur scout for the Vancouver Canucks of the National Hockey League (NHL). Delorme played in the NHL for the Colorado Rockies and the Vancouver Canucks, and in the World Hockey Association (WHA) for the Denver Spurs/Ottawa Civics.

Delorme was born in North Battleford, but grew up in Cochin, Saskatchewan. Though Delorme retired from the NHL in 1985, he has remained on the Vancouver Canucks staff for over 20 years as a scout and was appointed chief amateur scout in 2000.

Delorme is a Canadian Métis.

== Career statistics ==
=== Regular season and playoffs ===
			Regular season					Playoffs
Season	Team	League	GP	G	A	Pts	PIM	GP	G	A	Pts	PIM
1972–73	Prince Albert Raiders	SJHL	45	14	22	36	—	—	—	—	—	—
1973–74	Swift Current Broncos	WCHL	59	19	15	34	96	13	1	2	3	17
1974–75	Lethbridge Broncos	WCHL	69	30	57	87	144	6	1	7	8	20
1975–76	Lethbridge Broncos	WCHL	26	8	12	20	87	7	3	6	9	24
1975–76	Tucson Mavericks	CHL	18	2	5	7	18	—	—	—	—	—
1975–76	Denver Spurs/Ottawa Civics	WHA	22	1	3	4	28	—	—	—	—	—
1976–77	Tulsa Oilers	CHL	6	1	2	3	0	—	—	—	—	—
1976–77	Baltimore Clippers	SHL	24	4	6	10	4	—	—	—	—	—
1976–77	Colorado Rockies	NHL	29	6	4	10	23	—	—	—	—	—
1977–78	Colorado Rockies	NHL	68	10	11	21	47	2	0	0	0	10
1978–79	Colorado Rockies	NHL	77	20	8	28	47	—	—	—	—	—
1979–80	Colorado Rockies	NHL	75	19	4	23	76	—	—	—	—	—
1980–81	Colorado Rockies	NHL	65	11	16	27	70	—	—	—	—	—
1981–82	Vancouver Canucks	NHL	59	9	8	17	177	15	0	2	2	31
1982–83	Vancouver Canucks	NHL	56	5	8	13	87	4	0	0	0	10
1983–84	Vancouver Canucks	NHL	64	2	2	4	68	4	1	0	1	8
1984–85	Vancouver Canucks	NHL	31	1	2	3	51	—	—	—	—	—
NHL totals			524	83	63	146	667	25	1	2	3	59
WHA totals			22	1	3	4	28	—	—	—	—	—
