= Keith Wright (ice hockey) =

Canadian ice hockey player

- Born: April 13, 1944 (age 82) Aurora, Ontario, Canada
- Height: 6 ft 1 in (185 cm)
- Weight: 175 lb (79 kg; 12 st 7 lb)
- Position: Right wing
- Shot: Left
- Played for: Philadelphia Flyers
- Playing career: 1964–1973

Keith Edward Wright (born April 13, 1944) is a Canadian former professional ice hockey right winger. He played one game in the National Hockey League for the Philadelphia Flyers during the 1967–68 season, on February 7, 1968 against the Montreal Canadiens, and he recorded no points. The rest of his career, which lasted from 1964 to 1973, was spent in the minor leagues. Wright was born in Aurora, Ontario.

== Career statistics ==
=== Regular season and playoffs ===
			Regular season					Playoffs
Season	Team	League	GP	G	A	Pts	PIM	GP	G	A	Pts	PIM
1960–61	Peterborough T.P.T.'s Petes	OHA	48	5	10	15	50	5	0	1	1	2
1961–62	Peterborough T.P.T.'s Petes	OHA	50	13	22	35	67	—	—	—	—	—
1962–63	Peterborough T.P.T.'s Petes	OHA	50	21	23	44	59	6	0	2	2	0
1963–64	Peterborough T.P.T.'s Petes	OHA	5	2	3	5	6	3	1	0	1	4
1964–65	Omaha Knights	CHL	55	21	14	35	49	—	—	—	—	—
1965–66	Oklahoma City Blazers	CHL	68	16	22	38	66	9	2	3	5	7
1966–67	Oklahoma City Blazers	CHL	10	0	3	3	2	—	—	—	—	—
1966–67	California Seals	WHL	36	2	17	19	19	5	0	1	1	0
1967–68	Philadelphia Flyers	NHL	1	0	0	0	0	—	—	—	—	—
1967–68	Quebec Aces	AHL	72	20	23	43	42	15	6	6	12	4
1970–71	Quebec Aces	AHL	39	0	14	14	22	—	—	—	—	—
1970–71	Oklahoma City Blazers	CHL	14	1	2	3	2	5	0	0	0	0
1972–73	Orillia Terriers	OHA Sr	37	13	20	33	52	—	—	—	—	—
CHL totals			133	37	39	76	117	9	2	3	5	7
NHL totals			1	0	0	0	0	—	—	—	—	—

== See also ==
- List of players who played only one game in the NHL
