= Garry Peters (ice hockey) =

Canadian ice hockey player

- Born: October 9, 1942 (age 83) Regina, Saskatchewan, Canada
- Height: 5 ft 11 in (180 cm)
- Weight: 170 lb (77 kg; 12 st 2 lb)
- Position: Centre
- Shot: Left
- Played for: Montreal Canadiens; New York Rangers; Philadelphia Flyers; Boston Bruins; New York Raiders; New York Golden Blades; Jersey Knights
- Playing career: 1962–1974

Garry Lorne Peters (born October 9, 1942) is a Canadian former professional ice hockey centre and head coach who played in the National Hockey League (NHL) for the Montreal Canadiens, New York Rangers, Philadelphia Flyers and Boston Bruins. He also played in the World Hockey Association (WHA) for the New York Raiders and New York Golden Blades/Jersey Knights.

== Career statistics ==
=== Regular season and playoffs ===
			Regular season					Playoffs
Season	Team	League	GP	G	A	Pts	PIM	GP	G	A	Pts	PIM
1959–60	Regina Pats	SJHL	37	9	6	15	39	—	—	—	—	—
1960–61	Regina Pats	SJHL	57	36	46	82	94	10	10	12	22	8
1960–61	Regina Pats	M-Cup	—	—	—	—	—	6	2	2	4	2
1961–62	Regina Pats	SJHL	56	45	69	114	68	16	10	14	24	4
1962–63	Regina Pats	SJHL	50	37	39	76	100	4	1	0	1	15
1962–63	Hull-Ottawa Canadiens	EPHL	4	0	1	1	2	1	0	0	0	0
1962–63	Estevan Bruins	M-Cup	—	—	—	—	—	6	4	0	4	25
1963–64	Omaha Knights	CPHL	72	32	49	81	82	10	5	9	14	17
1964–65	Omaha Knights	CPHL	43	21	23	44	56	—	—	—	—	—
1964–65	Quebec Aces	AHL	4	1	2	3	4	—	—	—	—	—
1964–65	Montreal Canadiens	NHL	13	0	2	2	6	—	—	—	—	—
1965–66	New York Rangers	NHL	63	7	3	10	42	—	—	—	—	—
1966–67	Houston Apollos	CHL	50	21	31	52	90	—	—	—	—	—
1967–68	Philadelphia Flyers	NHL	31	7	5	12	22	—	—	—	—	—
1968–69	Philadelphia Flyers	NHL	66	8	6	14	49	4	1	1	2	16
1969–70	Philadelphia Flyers	NHL	59	6	10	16	69	—	—	—	—	—
1970–71	Philadelphia Flyers	NHL	73	6	7	13	69	4	1	1	2	15
1971–72	Boston Bruins	NHL	2	0	0	0	2	1	0	0	0	0
1971–72	Boston Braves	AHL	58	39	34	73	118	8	1	2	3	4
1972–73	New York Raiders	WHA	23	2	7	9	24	—	—	—	—	—
1973–74	New York Golden Blades/Jersey Knights	WHA	34	2	5	7	18	—	—	—	—	—
WHA totals			57	4	12	16	42	—	—	—	—	—
NHL totals			311	34	34	68	261	9	2	2	4	31

=== Coaching career ===
Season	Team	League	GP	W	L	T	W%
1974–75	Syracuse	NAHL	74	46	25	3	0.642%

== Awards ==
- 1963–64 — CPHL Rookie of the Year
- 1971–72 — Les Cunningham Award
