= 1969–70 WHL season =

- League: Western Hockey League
- Sport: Ice hockey
- Number of games: 72 (73)
- Number of teams: 7

Regular season
- Season champions: Portland Buckaroos
- Top scorer: Art Jones

Lester Patrick Cup
- Champions: Vancouver Canucks
- Runners-up: Portland Buckaroos

Seasons
- ← 1968–69 1970–71 →

The 1969–70 WHL season was the 18th season of the Western Hockey League. Seven teams played a 74-game schedule, and the Vancouver Canucks were the Lester Patrick Cup champions, defeating the Portland Buckaroos four games to one in the final series. The Salt Lake Golden Eagles joined the WHL as seventh team.

Prior to the start of the season the Vancouver Canucks were purchased by a group that was awarded a National Hockey League expansion team for the 1970–71 season, with plans to move the team to the NHL.

== Teams ==
1969–70 Western Hockey League
| Team | City | Arena | Capacity |
| Denver Spurs | Denver, Colorado | Denver Coliseum | 8,140 |
| Phoenix Roadrunners | Phoenix, Arizona | Arizona Veterans Memorial Coliseum | 12,371 |
| Portland Buckaroos | Portland, Oregon | Memorial Coliseum | 12,000 |
| Salt Lake Golden Eagles | Salt Lake City, Utah | Salt Palace | 10,594 |
| San Diego Gulls | San Diego, California | San Diego International Sports Center | 12,920 |
| Seattle Totems | Seattle, Washington | Seattle Center Coliseum | 12,250 |
| Vancouver Canucks | Vancouver, British Columbia | Pacific Coliseum | 15,038 |

=== Map of teams ===
WHL Teams

== Final standings ==
WHL Standings
| R | Team | GP | W | L | T | GF | GA | Pts |
|---|---|---|---|---|---|---|---|---|
| **1** | **Vancouver Canucks** | **72** | **47** | **17** | **8** | **334** | **219** | **102** |
| **2** | **Portland Buckaroos** | **72** | **42** | **23** | **7** | **322** | **241** | **91** |
| **3** | **San Diego Gulls** | **72** | **33** | **29** | **10** | **263** | **242** | **76** |
| **4** | **Seattle Totems** | **73** | **30** | **35** | **8** | **240** | **260** | **68** |
| 5 | Phoenix Roadrunners | 73 | 27 | 34 | 12 | 252 | 257 | 66 |
| 6 | Denver Spurs | 72 | 24 | 37 | 11 | 250 | 316 | 59 |
| 7 | Salt Lake Golden Eagles | 72 | 15 | 43 | 14 | 240 | 366 | 44 |

bold - qualified for playoffs

== Playoffs ==
Semifinals
1 | Vancouver Canucks | 4
3 | San Diego Gulls | 2
2 | Portland Buckaroos | 4
4 | Seattle Totems | 2

Finals
1 | Vancouver Canucks | 4
2 | Portland Buckaroos | 1

The Vancouver Canucks defeated the Portland Buckaroos 4 games to 1 to win the Lester Patrick Cup.
