= 1971–72 AHL season =

- League: American Hockey League
- Sport: Ice hockey

Regular season
- F. G. "Teddy" Oke Trophy: Boston Braves
- Season MVP: Garry Peters
- Top scorer: Don Blackburn

Playoffs
- Champions: Nova Scotia Voyageurs
- Runners-up: Baltimore Clippers

AHL seasons
- 1970–71 1972–73

The 1971–72 AHL season was the 36th season of the American Hockey League. Major changes occurred in the off-season. The league welcomed four expansion teams, and lost both Quebec-based teams. Eleven teams played 76 games each in the schedule. The Boston Braves finished first overall in the regular season. The Nova Scotia Voyageurs won their first Calder Cup championship.

== Team changes ==
- The Quebec Aces move to Richmond, Virginia becoming the Richmond Robins, playing in the West Division.
- The Montreal Voyageurs move to Halifax, Nova Scotia becoming the Nova Scotia Voyageurs.
- The Rochester Americans switch divisions from West to East.
- The Boston Braves join the AHL as an expansion team, based in Boston, Massachusetts, playing in the East Division.
- The Cincinnati Swords join the AHL as an expansion team, based in Cincinnati, Ohio, playing in the West Division.
- The Tidewater Wings join the AHL as an expansion team, based in Norfolk, Virginia, playing in the West Division.

== Final standings ==
Note: GP = Games played; W = Wins; L = Losses; T = Ties; GF = Goals for; GA = Goals against; PTS = Points;

East	GP	W	L	T	Pts	GF	GA
Boston Braves^{†} (BOS)	76	41	21	14	96	260	191
Nova Scotia Voyageurs (MTL)	76	41	21	14	96	274	202
Springfield Kings (LAK)	76	31	30	15	77	273	266
Providence Reds (NYR)	76	28	37	11	67	250	274
Rochester Americans (VAN)	76	28	38	10	66	242	311

West	GP	W	L	T	Pts	GF	GA
Baltimore Clippers (CGS)	76	34	31	11	79	240	249
Hershey Bears (PIT)	76	33	30	13	79	266	253
Cincinnati Swords (BUF)	76	30	28	18	78	252	258
Cleveland Barons (independent)	76	32	34	10	74	269	263
Richmond Robins (PHI)	76	29	34	13	71	237	218
Tidewater Wings (DET)	76	22	45	9	53	197	275

^{†} First place tiebreaker determined by head-to-head competition during regular season.

== Scoring leaders ==
Note: GP = Games played; G = Goals; A = Assists; Pts = Points; PIM = Penalty minutes

Player	Team	GP	G	A	Pts	PIM
Don Blackburn	Providence Reds	76	34	65	99	12
Fred Harvey	Cleveland Barons	73	41	54	95	72
Terry Caffery	Cleveland Barons	65	29	59	88	18
Gord Labossiere	Cleveland Barons	66	40	45	85	71
Ed Hoekstra	Springfield Kings	74	16	69	85	32
Pete Laframboise	Baltimore Clippers	72	37	44	81	95
Wayne Rivers	Springfield Kings	68	48	33	81	67
Germain Gagnon	Nova Scotia Voyageurs	70	25	56	81	34
Joe Szura	Baltimore Clippers	72	38	38	76	20
Doug Roberts	Boston Braves	74	35	40	75	107

- complete list

== Calder Cup playoffs ==
Division Semifinals
1	Boston	4
4	Providence	1
Eastern Division
2	Nova Scotia	4
3	Springfield	1
1	Baltimore	4
4	Cleveland	2
Western Division
2	Hershey	0
3	Cincinnati	4

Division Finals
1	Boston	0
2	Nova Scotia	4
1	Baltimore	4
3	Cincinnati	2

Calder Cup Final
E2	Nova Scotia	4
W1	Baltimore	2

== Trophy and award winners ==
Team awards

Calder Cup; Playoff champions:	Nova Scotia Voyageurs
F. G. "Teddy" Oke Trophy; Regular Season champions, East Division:	Boston Braves
John D. Chick Trophy; Regular Season champions, West Division:	Baltimore Clippers

Individual awards

Les Cunningham Award; Most valuable player:	Garry Peters - Boston Braves
John B. Sollenberger Trophy; Top point scorer:	Don Blackburn - Providence Reds
Dudley "Red" Garrett Memorial Award; Rookie of the year:	Terry Caffery - Cleveland Barons
Eddie Shore Award; Defenceman of the year:	Noel Price - Springfield Kings / Nova Scotia Voyageurs
Harry "Hap" Holmes Memorial Award; Lowest goals against average:	Dan Bouchard & Ross Brooks - Boston Braves
Louis A.R. Pieri Memorial Award; Coach of the year:	Al MacNeil - Nova Scotia Voyageurs

Other awards

James C. Hendy Memorial Award; Most outstanding executive:	Robert W. Clarke
James H. Ellery Memorial Award; Outstanding media coverage:	Al Fischer, Baltimore

== See also ==
- List of AHL seasons

Preceded by 1970–71 AHL season	AHL seasons	Succeeded by 1972–73 AHL season
