= 1971–72 WHL season =

- League: Western Hockey League
- Sport: Ice hockey
- Number of games: 72
- Number of teams: 6

Regular season
- Season champions: Portland Buckaroos
- Season MVP: Fran Huck (Denver)
- Top scorer: Art Jones (Portland)

Lester Patrick Cup
- Champions: Denver Spurs
- Runners-up: Portland Buckaroos

Seasons
- ← 1970–71 1972–73 →

The 1971–72 WHL season was the 20th season of the Western Hockey League. Six teams played a 72-game schedule, and the Denver Spurs were the Lester Patrick Cup champions, defeating the Portland Buckaroos four games to one in the final series.

Art Jones of Portland led the league in scoring and Fran Huck of Denver was named the most valuable player.

== Teams ==
1971–72 Western Hockey League
Team	City	Arena	Capacity
Denver Spurs	Denver, Colorado	Denver Coliseum	8,140
Phoenix Roadrunners	Phoenix, Arizona	Arizona Veterans Memorial Coliseum	12,371
Portland Buckaroos	Portland, Oregon	Memorial Coliseum	12,000
Salt Lake Golden Eagles	Salt Lake City, Utah	Salt Palace	10,594
San Diego Gulls	San Diego, California	San Diego Sports Arena	12,920
Seattle Totems	Seattle, Washington	Seattle Center Coliseum	12,250

=== Map of teams ===
WHL Teams

== Final standings ==
WHL Standings
R	Team	GP	W	L	T	GF	GA	Pts
**1**	**Denver Spurs**	**72**	**44**	**20**	**8**	**293**	**209**	**96**
**2**	**Phoenix Roadrunners**	**72**	**40**	**27**	**5**	**283**	**235**	**85**
**3**	**Portland Buckaroos**	**72**	**38**	**31**	**3**	**301**	**271**	**79**
**4**	**San Diego Gulls**	**72**	**32**	**31**	**9**	**241**	**243**	**73**
5	Salt Lake Golden Eagles	72	29	33	10	250	254	68
6	Seattle Totems	72	12	53	7	175	331	31

bold - qualified for playoffs

== Playoffs ==
Semifinals
1	Denver Spurs	4
3	San Diego Gulls	0
2	Portland Buckaroos	4
4	Phoenix Roadrunners	2

Finals
1	Denver Spurs	4
2	Portland Buckaroos	1

The Portland Buckaroos defeated the Phoenix Roadrunnrers 4 games to 1 to win the Lester Patrick Cup.

== Bibliography ==
- Stott, Jon C. (2008), Ice Warriors: The Pacific Coast/Western Hockey League 1948–1974, Surrey, British Columbia: Heritage House Publishing, ISBN 978-1-894974-54-7
