= Art Jones (ice hockey) =

Canadian ice hockey player (1935–2021)

- Born: January 31, 1935; Bangor, Saskatchewan, Canada
- Died: February 3, 2021 (aged 86); Happy Valley, Oregon, U.S.
- Height: 5 ft 10 in (178 cm)
- Weight: 150 lb (68 kg; 10 st 10 lb)
- Position: Centre
- Shot: Left
- Played for: New Westminster Royals; Portland Buckaroos; Seattle Totems; Victoria Cougars
- NHL draft: undrafted
- Playing career: 1957–1976

Art Jones (January 31, 1935 – February 3, 2021) was a Canadian ice hockey centre who played the majority of his career in the Western Hockey League for the Portland Buckaroos.

== Career ==
Jones played for the Buckaroos for their entire existence in the Western Hockey League (WHL) and led the team to three Lester Patrick Cups, the WHL championship. He was the WHL's leading scorer six times, and won the George Leader Cup, given to the league's most valuable player, twice (in 1967–68 and 1970–71). In 1970, he set the WHL scoring record for most points (127) in a season. Jones also played for the New Westminster Royals and Victoria Cougars of the WHL, and the Seattle Totems of the Central Hockey League.

After retiring from hockey, Jones settled in Portland, Oregon. He was named to the Oregon Sports Hall of Fame in 1984.

Jones scored 1,580 points in 1,180 games, which is second only to Guyle Fielder's 1,771 points in 1,368 WHL games. Although Fielder outscored Jones in the WHL by almost 200 points, Jones averaged a higher points per game total, averaging 1.34 PPG vs Fielder's WHL average of 1.29. As of February 2021, when including playing time in all minor professional leagues, Jones finished his career with 1,618 points, the third-highest total in minor league history. Fielder (1,929 career points) and longtime Johnstown Jets forward Dick Roberge (1,740 career points) are the only players ahead of Jones.

== Personal life ==
Jones retired from hockey in 1976. He died in Happy Valley, Oregon in 2021, three days after his 86th birthday.
