= 1970–71 WHL season =

- League: Western Hockey League
- Sport: Ice hockey
- Games: 72
- Teams: 6

Regular season
- Season champions: Portland Buckaroos
- Season MVP: Art Jones (Portland)
- Top scorer: Art Jones (Portland)

Lester Patrick Cup
- Champions: Portland Buckaroos
- Runners-up: Phoenix Roadrunners

Seasons
- 1969–70 1971–72

The 1970–71 WHL season was the 19th season of the Western Hockey League. Six teams played a 72-game schedule, and the Portland Buckaroos were the Lester Patrick Cup champions, defeating the Phoenix Roadrunners four games to one in the final series.

Art Jones of Portland led the league in scoring and was named the most valuable player.

== Teams ==
1970–71 Western Hockey League
Team	City	Arena	Capacity
Denver Spurs	Denver, Colorado	Denver Coliseum	8,140
Phoenix Roadrunners	Phoenix, Arizona	Arizona Veterans Memorial Coliseum	12,371
Portland Buckaroos	Portland, Oregon	Memorial Coliseum	12,000
Salt Lake Golden Eagles	Salt Lake City, Utah	Salt Palace	10,594
San Diego Gulls	San Diego, California	San Diego Sports Arena	12,920
Seattle Totems	Seattle, Washington	Seattle Center Coliseum	12,250

=== Map of teams ===
WHL Teams

== Final standings ==
WHL Standings
R	Team	GP	W	L	T	GF	GA	Pts
**1**	**Portland Buckaroos**	**72**	**48**	**17**	**7**	**306**	**210**	**103**
**2**	**Phoenix Roadrunners**	**72**	**36**	**27**	**9**	**271**	**234**	**81**
**3**	**San Diego Gulls**	**72**	**33**	**27**	**12**	**248**	**223**	**78**
**4**	**Denver Spurs**	**72**	**25**	**31**	**16**	**242**	**253**	**66**
5	Seattle Totems	72	27	36	9	223	260	63
6	Salt Lake Golden Eagles	72	18	49	5	217	327	41

bold - qualified for playoffs

== Playoffs ==
Semifinals
1	Portland Buckaroos	4
3	San Diego Gulls	2
2	Phoenix Roadrunners	4
4	Denver Spurs	1

Finals
1	Portland Buckaroos	4
2	Phoenix Roadrunners	1

The Portland Buckaroos defeated the Phoenix Roadrunnrers 4 games to 1 to win the Lester Patrick Cup.

== Bibliography ==
- Stott, Jon C. (2008), Ice Warriors: The Pacific Coast/Western Hockey League 1948–1974, Surrey, British Columbia: Heritage House Publishing, ISBN 978-1-894974-54-7
