= San Diego Gulls (1966–1974) =

WHL San Diego Gulls logo

The San Diego Gulls were a professional ice hockey team based in San Diego, California, that competed in the Western Hockey League (WHL). The team, the first to use the Gulls nickname, was founded in 1966. The Gulls ceased operations in 1974, when the World Hockey Association's Jersey Knights relocated to San Diego, becoming the San Diego Mariners. The team played its home games at the San Diego Sports Arena.

== History ==
Prior to the Gulls, the very first hockey team came to San Diego in the 1940s. They were called the San Diego Skyhawks and played at Glacier Gardens downtown. Even though they were a hockey team, they weren’t considered a pro team until the San Diego Gulls came to town. The Gulls arrived in 1966 and the Sky Hawks went out of business in 2006.

The Gulls were coached by Max McNab for six seasons from 1966 to 1972, and by Jack Evans for two seasons from 1972 to 1974. Willie O'Ree, the first black athlete to play in the NHL, was an All-Star for the team. His jersey is retired.

== Season-by-season results ==
Source: Legend: Pct=Winning percentage

Season	Games	Won	Lost	Tied	Points	Pct %	Goals for	Goals against
1966-67	72	22	47	3	47	0.326	222	266
1967-68	72	31	36	5	67	0.465	241	236
1968-69	74	33	29	12	78	0.527	273	260
1969-70	72	33	29	10	76	0.528	263	242
1970-71	72	33	27	12	78	0.542	248	223
1971-72	72	32	31	9	73	0.507	241	243
1972-73	72	32	29	11	75	0.521	239	223
1973-74	78	40	33	5	85	0.545	278	281
