= Denver Spurs =

- City: Denver, Colorado
- League: WHL 1968–74; CHL 1974–75; WHA 1975–76
- Operated: 1968–1976
- Home arena: Denver Coliseum (1968–1975); McNichols Sports Arena (1975–1976)
- Owner: Ivan Mullenix
- Media: KOA-TV; KLZ

Franchise history
- 1968–1976 (to January 1): Denver Spurs
- 1976 (folded January 17): Ottawa Civics

Championships
- Regular season titles: 1971–72 (WHL's Lester Patrick Cup)

The Denver Spurs were a professional ice hockey team based in Denver. The Spurs began play in the Western Hockey League in 1968, and played at the Denver Coliseum. The Spurs became the first professional sports team in Colorado to win a championship in 1971–72. After the WHL folded in 1974, the team transferred to the Central Hockey League for the 1974–75 season.

== Spurs in the WHA ==
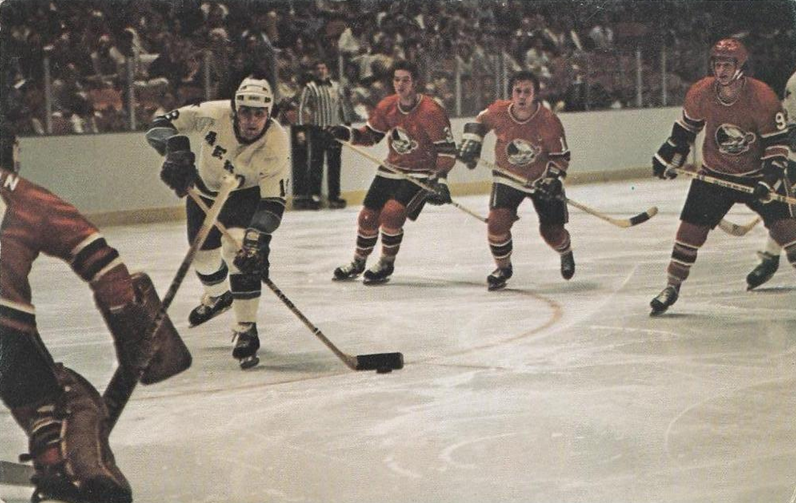
The Denver Spurs in action against the Houston Aeros, c. 1975

In June, 1974, Ivan Mullenix, owner of the CHL Spurs, was awarded a "conditional" NHL franchise for the 1976-77 season. With the McNichols Sports Arena already complete by 1975, he looked to enter the NHL a year early, and the league attempted to broker an arrangement whereby Mullenix would acquire the California Golden Seals (then under league ownership) and move them to Denver in lieu of an expansion team. At the same time, the bankrupt Pittsburgh Penguins would be sold to a Seattle group who also held a conditional franchise, which would have been named the Seattle Totems.

The proposed arrangement fell through, and with the continuing franchise difficulties, the NHL called off the 1976-77 expansion. Mullenix accepted an offer from the WHA to join that league for the 1975-76 season. The Spurs were the second WHL refugee to join the WHA, following the Phoenix Roadrunners.

The WHA Spurs claimed most of the players in a dispersal draft from the Chicago Cougars, who had folded in 1975, and some players from the CHL Spurs were also retained.

A Sports Illustrated preview on the upcoming WHA season noted that it was stalwart Gordie Howe's 28th year in major league hockey, and the Spurs' first. The magazine picked the expansion team to finish last in the WHA's Western Division. It also said that unless the Spurs drew well immediately, "Denver's stay in big-league hockey could be exactly 27 years shorter than Gordie Howe's."

The Spurs' first exhibition game, against Howe's Houston Aeros, proved to be a harbinger of things to come. No beer was available because Mullenix was unable to get a liquor license, there was no flag to face during the national anthem, and the scoreboards didn't work. Only 5,000 fans showed up. The situation didn't get much better during the regular season; they only averaged 3,000 fans in a 16,800-seat arena. The most widely cited reason for the poor attendance was hard feelings over being spurned by the NHL. Denver-area fans had been banking on an NHL team after three years of advertising and did not consider the WHA to be a major league.

The situation wasn't much better on the ice either. Veteran Ralph Backstrom, one of the many refugees from the Cougars, was one of the Spurs' few experienced players. However, at 38 his career was in decline. Still, he wound up leading the team with 50 points in 41 games. The rest of the roster was filled with cast-offs and career minor-leaguers, such as Don Borgeson, who had played for the WHL Spurs from 1971–73; he finished second to Backstrom in points scored with 41. They could never find an answer in goal; one of their goalies ran up a staggering 15.00 goals against average (GAA).

The Spurs played their first regular-season game at home against the Indianapolis Racers. Before only 5,000 fans, the Spurs scored the first goal, only to give up seven unanswered goals en route to a 7-1 loss. By December 30, they were in the Western Division cellar with a 13–20–1 mark, despite an overtime win over the Racers that night in Denver. It would turn out to be the last game the Spurs would play in Colorado.

Rumors had abounded even before the Spurs got on the ice that the NHL was planning to move either the Seals or the second-year Kansas City Scouts to Denver. By late December, Mullenix got word that the Scouts were in very serious discussions about moving to Denver for the following season. Knowing he couldn't hope to compete with an NHL team, Mullenix began the process of selling the team to the "Founders Club," a group of businessmen based in Ottawa, on New Year's Eve. He had initially begun negotiations with the Founders Club a month into the season when the first rumors cropped up of a Scouts move to Denver. Soon after Mullenix reopened the Ottawa feelers, the Founders Club insisted that Mullenix move the team to Ottawa immediately.

In the middle of a road trip, Mullenix quietly moved the Spurs to Ottawa on January 2, 1976, where they were renamed the Ottawa Civics. The players had heard talk a move out of Denver was imminent, but only learned of the move at their next road game that night in Cincinnati, when they took the ice in their Denver jerseys and saw the name "Civics" on the scoreboard.

Despite playing to sellout crowds at two home games in Ottawa, Mullenix and the Founders Club were unable to reach a deal. The Founders Club could not meet Mullenix' asking price, and Mullenix was not willing to operate the team in Ottawa. After the Founders Club offered $1 million for the franchise, short of Mullenix' demand of $1.5 million, negotiations for the sale were called off on January 15, and the team folded for good two days later. The Spurs/Civics' 41-game existence made them easily the shortest-lived franchise in WHA history, and one of the shortest-lived franchises in North American professional sports history.

The Spurs' abrupt departure turned out to be a prescient move, as the Scouts indeed moved to Denver for the following season, becoming the Colorado Rockies. The Rockies only lasted six seasons, though, before relocating again and becoming the New Jersey Devils. It would not be until the relocation of the Quebec Nordiques (ironically, a former WHA franchise) to Denver as the Colorado Avalanche in 1995 that Denver would enjoy lasting success in major league hockey.

The last active Spurs player in the NHL was Ron Delorme, who retired after the 1984-85 season and also played with the Colorado Rockies. As well, Spurs draft pick Mel Bridgman played in the NHL until 1989, but never played in the WHA. In 1992 Bridgman became the first general manager of the new Ottawa Senators NHL franchise, which would initially play its home games at the Civic Centre.

== Season-by-season record ==
- 1968–74 – Western Hockey League
- 1974–75 – Central Hockey League
- 1975–76 – World Hockey Association

Note: GP = Games played, W = Wins, L = Losses, T = Ties, Pts = Points, GF = Goals for, GA = Goals against, PIM = Penalties in minutes

Season	GP	W	L	T	Pts	GF	GA	PIM	Finish	Playoffs
1968–69	74	23	44	7	53	254	308	683	Fifth in League	Out of playoffs
1969–70	72	24	37	11	59	250	316	736	Sixth in League	Out of playoffs
1970–71	72	25	31	16	66	242	253	804	Fourth in League	Lost semi-final to Phoenix Roadrunners, 1-4
1971–72	72	44	20	8	96	293	209	993	First in League	Won semi-final over San Diego Gulls, 4-0; Won final over Portland Buckaroos, 4-1
1972–73	72	27	32	13	67	264	275	1022	Fourth in League	Lost semi-final to Salt Lake Golden Eagles, 1-4
1973–74	78	28	50	0	56	249	335	0	Sixth in League	Out of playoffs
1974–75	78	36	29	13	85	285	263	1406	Second in Northern	Lost quarter-final to Omaha Knights, 0-2
1975–76	41	14	26	1	29	134	172	536	Fifth in Western	Team moved to Ottawa to become Ottawa Civics after 34 games. Franchise folded 7 games later.
