= 1965–66 AHL season =

- League: American Hockey League
- Sport: Ice hockey

Regular season
- F. G. "Teddy" Oke Trophy: Quebec Aces
- Season MVP: Dick Gamble
- Top scorer: Dick Gamble

Playoffs
- Champions: Rochester Americans
- Runners-up: Cleveland Barons

AHL seasons
- 1964–65 1966–67

The 1965–66 AHL season was the 30th season of the American Hockey League. Nine teams played 72 games each in the schedule. The league played a limited interlocking schedule with the Western Hockey League which was repeated two seasons later. The Quebec Aces finished first overall in the regular season. The Rochester Americans won their second consecutive Calder Cup championship.

== Final standings ==
Note: GP = Games played; W = Wins; L = Losses; T = Ties; GF = Goals for; GA = Goals against; Pts = Points;

| East | GP | W | L | T | Pts | GF | GA |
|---|---|---|---|---|---|---|---|
| Quebec Aces (MTL) | 72 | 47 | 21 | 4 | 98 | 337 | 226 |
| Hershey Bears (BOS) | 72 | 37 | 30 | 5 | 79 | 268 | 232 |
| Springfield Indians (independent) | 72 | 31 | 38 | 3 | 65 | 207 | 235 |
| Baltimore Clippers (NYR) | 72 | 27 | 43 | 2 | 56 | 212 | 254 |
| Providence Reds (independent) | 72 | 20 | 49 | 3 | 43 | 184 | 310 |

| West | GP | W | L | T | Pts | GF | GA |
|---|---|---|---|---|---|---|---|
| Rochester Americans (TOR) | 72 | 46 | 21 | 5 | 97 | 288 | 221 |
| Cleveland Barons (independent) | 72 | 38 | 32 | 2 | 78 | 243 | 217 |
| Pittsburgh Hornets (DET) | 72 | 38 | 33 | 1 | 77 | 236 | 218 |
| Buffalo Bisons (CHI) | 72 | 29 | 40 | 3 | 61 | 215 | 243 |

== Scoring leaders ==
Note: GP = Games played; G = Goals; A = Assists; Pts = Points; PIM = Penalty minutes

| Player | Team | GP | G | A | Pts | PIM |
|---|---|---|---|---|---|---|
| Dick Gamble | Rochester Americans | 71 | 47 | 51 | 98 | 22 |
| Cleland Mortson | Quebec Aces | 65 | 33 | 62 | 95 | 56 |
| Gerry Ehman | Rochester Americans | 70 | 39 | 49 | 88 | 28 |
| Jim Pappin | Rochester Americans | 63 | 36 | 51 | 87 | 116 |
| Bob Courcy | Cleveland Barons | 72 | 26 | 60 | 86 | 10 |
| Gene Ubriaco | Hershey Bears | 72 | 42 | 44 | 86 | 18 |
| Mike Walton | Rochester Americans | 68 | 35 | 51 | 86 | 67 |
| Gord Labossiere | Quebec Aces | 63 | 31 | 51 | 82 | 137 |
| Wayne Hicks | Quebec Aces | 72 | 32 | 49 | 81 | 24 |
| Gerry Melnyk | Buffalo Bisons | 69 | 18 | 61 | 79 | 10 |

- complete list

== Calder Cup playoffs ==
First round

- Rochester Americans defeated Quebec Aces 4 games to 2.
- Springfield Indians defeated Hershey Bears 3 games to 0.
- Cleveland Barons defeated Pittsburgh Hornets 3 games to 0.

Second round

- Rochester Americans earned second round bye.
- Cleveland Barons defeated Springfield Indians 3 games to 0.

Finals

- Rochester Americans defeated Cleveland Barons 4 games to 2, to win the Calder Cup.
- list of scores

== Trophy and award winners ==
Team awards

| Calder Cup; Playoff champions: | Rochester Americans |
| F. G. "Teddy" Oke Trophy; Regular season champions, East Division: | Quebec Aces |
| John D. Chick Trophy; Regular season champions, West Division: | Rochester Americans |

Individual awards

| Les Cunningham Award; Most valuable player: | Dick Gamble – Rochester Americans |
| John B. Sollenberger Trophy; Top point scorer: | Dick Gamble – Rochester Americans |
| Dudley "Red" Garrett Memorial Award; Rookie of the year: | Mike Walton – Rochester Americans |
| Eddie Shore Award; Defenceman of the year: | Jim Morrison – Quebec Aces |
| Harry "Hap" Holmes Memorial Award; Lowest goals against average: | Les Binkley – Cleveland Barons |

Other awards

| James C. Hendy Memorial Award; Most outstanding executive: | Jack Riley |
| James H. Ellery Memorial Award; Outstanding media coverage: | Hans Tanner, Rochester |

== See also ==
- List of AHL seasons

| Preceded by 1964–65 AHL season | AHL seasons | Succeeded by 1966–67 AHL season |
