= Quebec Aces =

Ice hockey team

Quebec Aces As de Québec
- City: Quebec City, Quebec
- League: Quebec City Railway-Paper League (1928–1936); Quebec Amateur Hockey Association (1936–1941); Quebec Senior Hockey League (1941–1953); Quebec Hockey League (1953–1959); American Hockey League (1959–1971)
- Operated: 1928–1971
- Home arena: Colisée de Québec
- Colors: Green, White & Red
- Affiliates: Philadelphia Flyers

Franchise history
- 1928–1971: Quebec Aces
- 1971–1976: Richmond Robins

Championships
- Division titles: 5 (2 QHL, 3 AHL)

The Quebec Aces, known in French as As de Québec, were an amateur and later a professional men's ice hockey team from Quebec City, Quebec.

== History ==
The Aces were founded in 1928 by Anglo-Canadian Pulp and Paper Mills, the name Aces standing for Anglo-Canadian Employees with an s to form a plural. The French name was added later. The Aces played until 1971, from 1930 on playing home games at the Colisée de Québec. Most notable of the Aces' players was the legendary Jean Béliveau, who played for the Quebec Aces in 1951-52 and 1952–53.

The Aces were Allan Cup champions in 1944, while still playing as an amateur team. The Aces turned professional the following season, joining the Quebec Senior Hockey League (1944–1953), Quebec Hockey League (1953–1959) and American Hockey League (1959–1971).

The Aces were league champions of the Quebec Hockey League in 1953–54 and 1956–57, winning the Thomas O'Connell Memorial Trophy. The Aces challenged for the Edinburgh Trophy both seasons, versus the Western Hockey League champions, losing in 1953–54 versus the Calgary Stampeders, and winning in 1956–57 versus the Brandon Regals. (Stott, Jon C. Ice Warriors: The Pacific Coast/Western Hockey League 1948–74, pp. 58, 82)

During the team's later years in the AHL, the Aces were the farm club for the Philadelphia Flyers four seasons from 1967 to 1971, giving the early Flyers teams a strong Quebec presence with players such as Andre Lacroix, Jean-Guy Gendron, Simon Nolet, Serge Bernier and Rosaire Paiement, all former Aces. The Flyers also owned the "Junior Aces" team which played in the Quebec Junior Hockey League since the 1964–65 season. The Flyers sold the junior team's assets in 1969 to group who founded the Quebec Remparts. Paul Dumont, served as the general manager of the Junior Aces. In 1971, the Flyers chose to relocate their farm team to Richmond, Virginia. The Aces became the Richmond Robins for the 1971–72 season.

The Aces name was revived by a team from the Ligue nord-américaine de hockey from 1997 to 1998, and 2001 to 2003. The team relocated in 2007 and is now known as Pont Rouge Lois Jeans.

== Season-by-season results ==
- 1928–1936 (Quebec City Railway-Paper League)
- 1936–1941 (Montreal Senior Group, QAHA)
- 1941–1953 (Quebec Senior Hockey League)
- 1953–1959 (Quebec Hockey League)
- 1959–1971 (American Hockey League)

=== Regular season ===
Some results unavailable from 1928 to 1944.

Season	Games	Won	Lost	Tied	Points	Goals for	Goals against	Standing
1936–37	24	13	10	1	27	81	58	3rd, QAHA(MSG)
1937–38	22	12	8	2	30†	61	37	2nd, QAHA(MSG)
1938–39	22	5	14	3	15†	62	72	6th, QAHA(MSG)
1939–40	30	10	14	6	26	85	85	6th, QAHA(MSG)
1940–41	36	19	12	5	43	151	125	3rd, QAHA(MSG)
1942–43	34	16	14	4	36	149	131	2nd, QSHL
1943–44	18	17	1	0	34	129	50	1st, QSHL
1944–45	24	15	7	2	32	160	89	2nd, QSHL
1945–46	50	17	30	3	37	149	169	4th, QSHL
1946–47	40	19	15	6	44	159	158	3rd, QSHL
1947–48	48	23	20	5	51	175	185	4th, QSHL
1948–49	60	22	32	6	50	186	213	5th, QSHL
1949–50	60	35	22	3	73	207	175	2nd, QSHL
1950–51	60	31	22	7	69	228	195	2nd, QSHL
1951–52	60	37	16	7	81	230	168	1st, QSHL
1952–53	60	22	26	12	56	178	197	6th, QSHL
1953–54	72	30	34	8	68	216	212	4th, QHL
1954–55	60	31	27	2	65	206	208	2nd, QHL
1955–56	64	23	37	4	50	190	230	4th, QHL
1956–57	68	40	21	7	87	226	175	1st, QHL
1957–58	64	29	31	4	62	224	233	4th, QHL
1958–59	62	21	33	8	50	176	232	4th, QHL
1959–60	72	19	51	2	40	178	333	7th, AHL
1960–61	72	30	39	3	63	217	267	6th, AHL
1961–62	70	30	36	4	64	208	207	4th, East
1962–63	72	33	28	11	77	206	210	4th, East
1963–64	72	41	30	1	83	258	225	1st, East
1964–65	72	44	26	2	90	280	223	1st, East
1965–66	72	47	21	4	98	337	226	1st, East
1966–67	72	35	30	7	77	275	249	3rd, East
1967–68	72	33	28	11	77	277	240	2nd, West
1968–69	74	26	34	14	66	235	258	3rd, West
1969–70	72	27	39	6	60	221	272	3rd, East
1970–71	72	25	31	16	66	211	240	4th, East

† From 1936 to 1939, Quebec played some 4-point games against Victorias and McGill. 1936-41: Source: Ottawa Citizen, 1943–44: Ottawa Citizen

=== Playoffs ===
American Hockey League seasons only.

Season	1st round	2nd round	Finals
1959–60	Out of playoffs		
1960–61	Out of playoffs		
1961–62	Out of playoffs		
1962–63	Out of playoffs		
1963–64	W, 4–1, Pittsburgh	bye	L, 0–4, Cleveland
1964–65	L, 1–4, Rochester	—	—
1965–66	L, 2–4, Rochester	—	—
1966–67	L, 2–3, Baltimore	—	—
1967–68	W, 3–2, Buffalo	W, 3–1, Providence	L, 2–4, Rochester
1968–69	W, 3–2, Cleveland	W, 3–2, Providence	L, 1–4, Hershey
1969–70	L, 2–4, Buffalo	—	—
1970–71	L, 3-4, Springfield^{†}	Out of playoffs	

^{†}One game tiebreaker to determine final playoff position.
