= List of Boston Bruins players =

This is a complete list of ice hockey players who have played for the Boston Bruins in the National Hockey League (NHL). It includes players that have played at least one game, either in the NHL regular season or in the NHL playoffs.

== Key ==
- * Appeared in a Bruins game during the 2025–26 season.
- † Stanley Cup Champion or Hockey Hall of Fame.

Abbreviations
| GP | Games played |
| SC | Stanley Cup Champion |

Goaltenders
| W | Wins |
| SO | Shutouts |
| L | Losses |
| GAA | Goals against average |
| T | Ties |
| OTL ^{a} | Overtime losses |
| SV% | Save percentage |

Skaters
| Pos | Position | RW | Right wing | A | Assists |
| D | Defenseman | C | Center | P | Points |
| LW | Left wing | G | Goals | PIM | Penalty minutes |

The "Seasons" column lists the first year of the season of the player's first game and the last year of the season of the player's last game. For example, a player who played one game in the 2000–01 season would be listed as playing with the team from 2000–2001, regardless of what calendar year the game occurred within.

Statistics complete as of the 2025–26 NHL season.

== Goaltenders ==
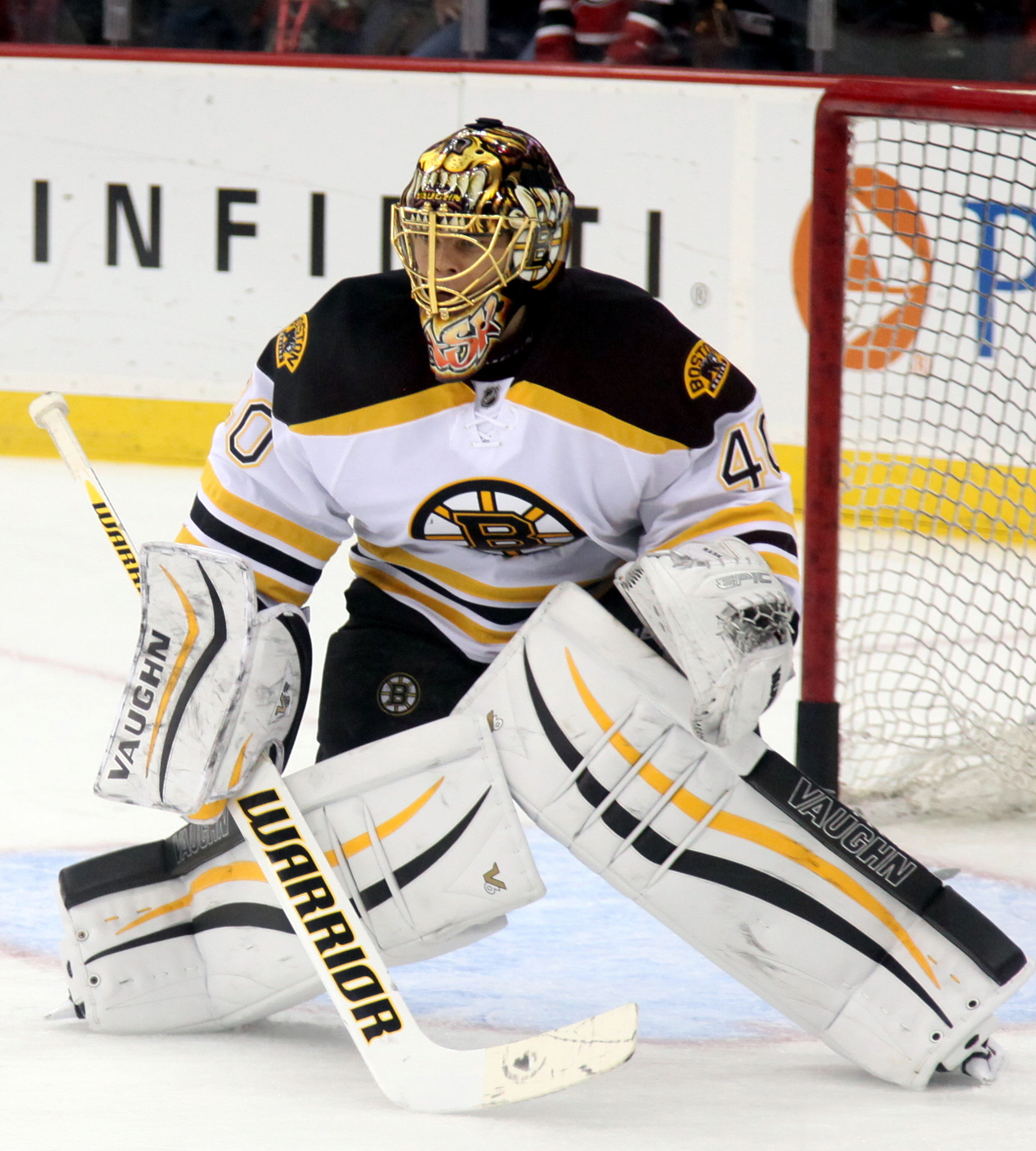
Tuukka Rask

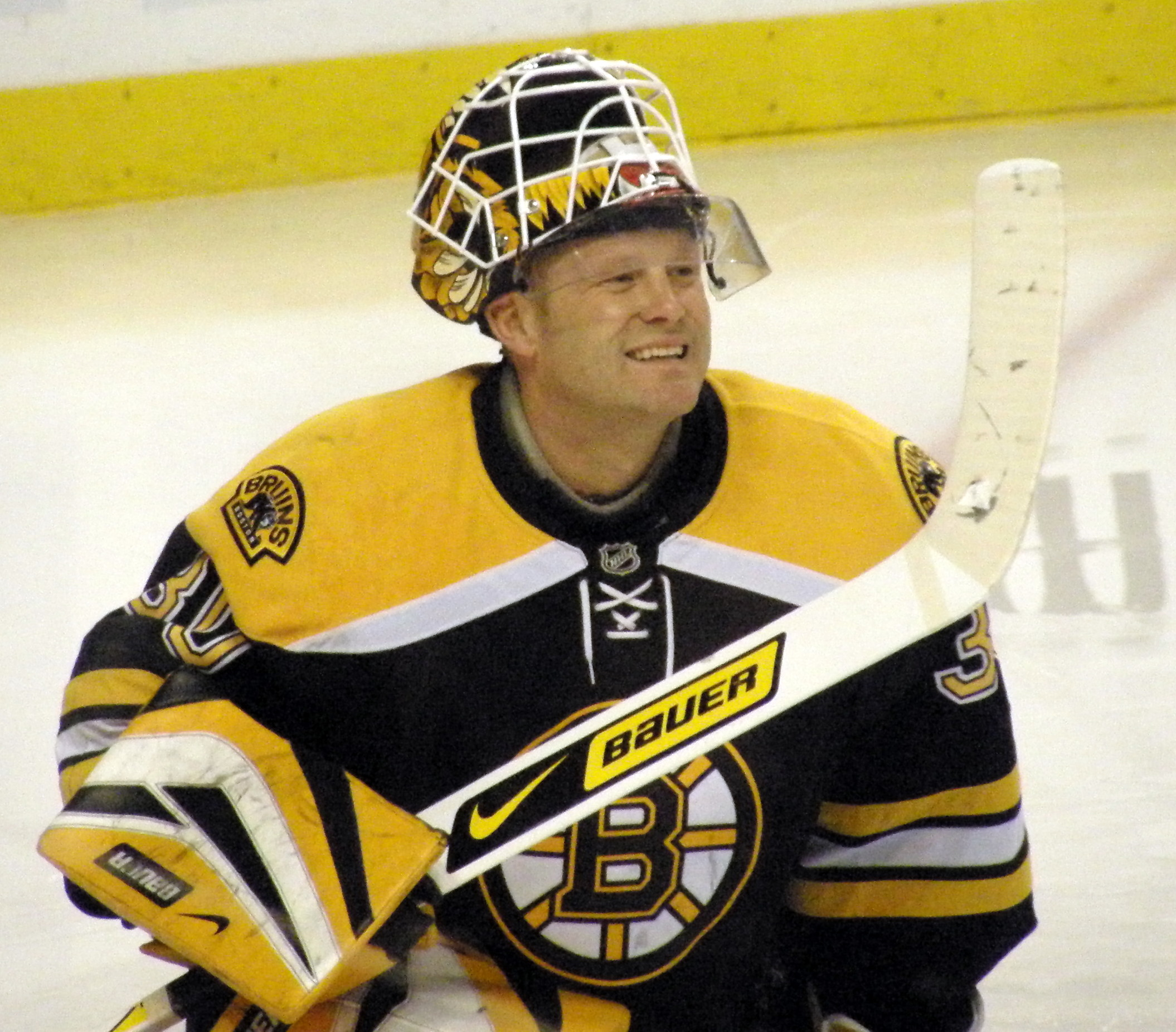
Tim Thomas

| Goalie | Nationality | Seasons | Regular season | | | | | | | | Playoffs | | | | | | Notes |
| Goalie | Nationality | Seasons | GP | W | L | T | OTL | SO | GAA | SV% | GP | W | L | SO | GAA | SV% | Notes |
|---|---|---|---|---|---|---|---|---|---|---|---|---|---|---|---|---|---|
| Abbott, George | Canada | 1943–1944 | 1 | 0 | 1 | 0 | — | 0 | 7.00 | — | — | — | — | — | — | — | |
| Adams, John | Canada | 1972–1973 | 1 | 0 | 0 | — | 0 | 0 | 0.00 | .000 | — | — | — | — | — | — | |
| Auld, Alex | Canada | 2007–2008 | 23 | 9 | 7 | — | 5 | 2 | 2.32 | .919 | — | — | — | — | — | — | |
| Bailey, Scott | Canada | 1995–1997 | 19 | 6 | 6 | 2 | — | 0 | 3.42 | .876 | — | — | — | — | — | — | |
| Bales, Mike | Canada | 1992–1993 | 1 | 0 | 0 | 0 | — | 0 | 2.42 | .900 | — | — | — | — | — | — | |
| Baron, Marco | Canada | 1979–1983 | 64 | 31 | 23 | 5 | — | 1 | 3.41 | .866 | 1 | 0 | 1 | 0 | 9.00 | .750 | |
| Belanger, Yves | Canada | 1979–1980 | 8 | 2 | 0 | 3 | — | 0 | 3.48 | .856 | — | — | — | — | — | — | |
| Bennett, Harvey | Canada | 1944–1945 | 25 | 10 | 12 | 2 | — | 0 | 4.20 | — | — | — | — | — | — | — | |
| Berthiaume, Daniel | Canada | 1991–1992 | 8 | 1 | 4 | 2 | — | 0 | 3.16 | .865 | — | — | — | — | — | — | |
| Bibeault, Paul | Canada | 1944–1946 | 43 | 14 | 22 | 6 | — | 2 | 3.86 | — | — | — | — | — | — | — | |
| Billington, Craig | Canada | 1994–1996 | 35 | 15 | 14 | 3 | — | 1 | 3.35 | .866 | 2 | 0 | 1 | 0 | 4.94 | .816 | |
| Bittner, Richard | United States | 1949–1950 | 1 | 0 | 0 | 1 | — | 0 | 3.00 | – | — | — | — | — | — | — | |
| Blue, John | Canada | 1992–1994 | 41 | 14 | 16 | 7 | — | 1 | 2.94 | .889 | 2 | 0 | 1 | 0 | 3.12 | .898 | |
| Brimsek, Frank† | United States | 1938–1949 | 444 | 230 | 144 | 70 | — | 35 | 2.57 | — | 68 | 32 | 36 | 2 | 2.54 | — | HOF 1966, SC 1939, SC 1941 |
| Broderick, Ken | Canada | 1973–1975 | 20 | 9 | 8 | 1 | — | 1 | 2.61 | .895 | — | — | — | — | — | — | |
| Brooks, Ross | Canada | 1972–1975 | 54 | 37 | 7 | 6 | — | 4 | 2.64 | .903 | 1 | 0 | 0 | 0 | 9.00 | .727 | |
| Carey, Jim | United States | 1996–1998 | 29 | 8 | 15 | 1 | — | 2 | 3.52 | .878 | — | — | — | — | — | — | |
| Casey, Jon | United States | 1993–1994 | 57 | 30 | 15 | 9 | — | 4 | 2.88 | .881 | 11 | 5 | 6 | 0 | 2.92 | .890 | |
| Chadwick, Ed | Canada | 1961–1962 | 4 | 0 | 3 | 1 | — | 0 | 5.50 | .852 | — | — | — | — | — | — | |
| Cheevers, Gerry† | Canada | 1965–1972; 1975–1980 | 416 | 226 | 103 | 76 | — | 26 | 2.89 | .901 | 88 | 53 | 34 | 8 | 2.70 | .902 | HOF 1985, SC 1970, SC 1972 |
| Cheveldae, Tim | Canada | 1996–1997 | 2 | 0 | 1 | 0 | — | 0 | 3.22 | .848 | — | — | — | — | — | — | |
| Colvin, Les | Canada | 1948–1949 | 1 | 0 | 1 | 0 | — | 0 | 4.00 | — | — | — | — | — | — | — | |
| Courteau, Maurice | Canada | 1943–1944 | 6 | 2 | 4 | 0 | — | 0 | 5.50 | — | — | — | — | — | — | — | |
| Craig, Jim | United States | 1980–1981 | 23 | 9 | 7 | 6 | — | 0 | 3.68 | .861 | — | — | — | — | — | — | |
| Cude, Wilf | Great Britain | 1931–1932 | 2 | 1 | 1 | 0 | — | 0 | 3.00 | — | — | — | — | — | — | — | |
| Dafoe, Byron | Canada | 1997–2002 | 283 | 132 | 104 | 40 | — | 25 | 2.30 | .911 | 24 | 10 | 14 | 3 | 2.26 | .909 | |
| Damore, Nick | Canada | 1941–1942 | 1 | 1 | 0 | 0 | — | 0 | 3.00 | — | — | — | — | — | — | — | |
| Daskalakis, Cleon | United States | 1984–1987 | 12 | 3 | 4 | 1 | — | 0 | 4.86 | .839 | — | — | — | — | — | — | |
| Defelice, Norm | Canada | 1956–1957 | 10 | 3 | 5 | 2 | — | 0 | 3.00 | .894 | — | — | — | — | — | — | |
| DelGuidice, Matt | United States | 1990–1992 | 11 | 2 | 5 | 1 | — | 0 | 3.87 | .886 | — | — | — | — | — | — | |
| DiPietro, Michael* | Canada | 2025–2026 | 1 | 0 | 0 | — | 0 | 0 | 0.00 | 1.000 | — | — | — | — | — | — | |
| Evans, Claude | Canada | 1957–1958 | 5 | 1 | 2 | 1 | — | 0 | 3.69 | .882 | — | — | — | — | — | — | |
| Fernandez, Manny | Canada | 2007–2009 | 32 | 18 | 10 | — | 3 | 2 | 2.76 | .902 | — | — | — | — | — | — | |
| Finley, Brian | Canada | 2006–2007 | 4 | 0 | 2 | — | 0 | 0 | 4.70 | .851 | — | — | — | — | — | — | |
| Foster, Norm | Canada | 1990–1991 | 3 | 2 | 1 | 0 | — | 0 | 2.73 | .891 | — | — | — | — | — | — | |
| Fowler, Hec | Canada | 1924–1925 | 7 | 1 | 6 | 0 | — | 0 | 6.16 | — | — | — | — | — | — | — | |
| Franks, Jimmy | Canada | 1943–1944 | 1 | 0 | 1 | 0 | — | 0 | 6.00 | — | — | — | — | — | — | — | |
| Gamble, Bruce | Canada | 1960–1962 | 80 | 18 | 51 | 11 | — | 1 | 3.93 | .887 | — | — | — | — | — | — | |
| Gardiner, Bert | Canada | 1943–1944 | 41 | 17 | 19 | 5 | — | 1 | 5.17 | — | — | — | — | — | — | — | |
| Gelineau, Jack | Canada | 1948–1951 | 141 | 46 | 62 | 33 | — | 7 | 3.04 | — | 4 | 1 | 2 | 1 | 1.62 | — | |
| Gilbert, Gilles | Canada | 1973–1980 | 277 | 155 | 73 | 39 | — | 16 | 2.95 | .890 | 31 | 17 | 14 | 3 | 3.01 | .895 | |
| Gill, Andre | Canada | 1967–1968 | 5 | 3 | 1 | 0 | — | 1 | 2.89 | .903 | — | — | — | — | — | — | |
| Grahame, John | United States | 1999–2003 | 76 | 29 | 30 | 9 | — | 4 | 2.78 | .899 | — | — | — | — | — | — | |
| Grahame, Ron | Canada | 1977–1978 | 40 | 26 | 6 | 7 | — | 3 | 2.76 | .874 | 4 | 2 | 1 | 0 | 2.08 | .894 | |
| Grant, Benny | Canada | 1943–1944 | 1 | 0 | 1 | 0 | — | 0 | 10.00 | — | — | — | — | — | — | — | |
| Gustavsson, Jonas | Sweden | 2015–2016 | 24 | 11 | 9 | — | 1 | 1 | 2.72 | .908 | — | — | — | — | — | — | |
| Hackett, Jeff | Canada | 2002–2003 | 18 | 8 | 9 | 0 | — | 1 | 3.03 | .894 | 3 | 1 | 2 | 0 | 1.67 | .934 | |
| Halak, Jaroslav | Slovakia | 2018–2021 | 90 | 49 | 23 | — | 14 | 10 | 2.40 | .918 | 9 | 4 | 5 | 0 | 2.76 | .902 | |
| Head, Don | Canada | 1961–1962 | 38 | 9 | 26 | 3 | — | 2 | 4.16 | .879 | — | — | — | — | — | — | |
| Henderson, John | Canada | 1954–1956 | 46 | 15 | 14 | 16 | — | 5 | 2.58 | .857 | 2 | 0 | 2 | 0 | 4.00 | .758 | |
| Henry, Gord | Canada | 1948–1950 | 3 | 1 | 2 | 0 | — | 1 | 1.67 | — | 5 | 1 | 4 | 0 | 4.24 | .753 | |
| Henry, Jim | Canada | 1951–1955 | 237 | 93 | 99 | 44 | — | 24 | 2.53 | — | 23 | 8 | 14 | 1 | 2.91 | .879 | |
| Jackson, Percy | Canada | 1931–1932; 1935–1936 | 7 | 1 | 3 | 1 | — | 0 | 4.00 | — | — | — | — | — | — | — | |
| Johnson, Chad | Canada | 2013–2014 | 27 | 17 | 4 | — | 3 | 2 | 2.10 | .925 | — | — | — | — | — | — | |
| Johnston, Eddie† | Canada | 1962–1973 | 444 | 182 | 192 | 54 | — | 27 | 3.22 | .900 | 13 | 7 | 6 | 1 | 2.91 | .908 | SC 1970, SC 1972 |
| Junkin, Joe | Canada | 1968–1969 | 1 | 0 | 0 | 0 | — | 0 | 0.00 | 1.000 | — | — | — | — | — | — | |
| Keans, Doug | Canada | 1983–1988 | 154 | 83 | 46 | 13 | — | 4 | 3.33 | .877 | 6 | 2 | 4 | 0 | 4.37 | .845 | |
| Keenan, Don | Canada | 1958–1959 | 1 | 0 | 1 | 0 | — | 0 | 4.00 | .902 | — | — | — | — | — | — | |
| Khudobin, Anton | Russia | 2011–2013; 2016–2018 | 62 | 33 | 16 | — | 9 | 2 | 2.50 | .914 | 1 | 0 | 0 | 0 | 0.00 | 1.000 | |
| Kinkaid, Keith | United States | 2022–2023 | 1 | 1 | 0 | — | 0 | 0 | 1.00 | .968 | — | — | — | — | — | — | |
| Korpisalo, Joonas* | Finland | 2024–2026 | 58 | 25 | 19 | — | 9 | 4 | 3.03 | .894 | 1 | 0 | 0 | 0 | 0.00 | 1.000 | |
| Lacher, Blaine | Canada | 1994–1996 | 47 | 22 | 16 | 4 | — | 4 | 2.80 | .887 | 5 | 1 | 4 | 0 | 2.55 | .904 | |
| Lemelin, Rejean | Canada | 1987–1993 | 183 | 92 | 62 | 17 | — | 6 | 3.09 | .884 | 28 | 12 | 10 | 1 | 3.09 | .879 | |
| Lockhart, Howard | Canada | 1924–1925 | 2 | 0 | 2 | 0 | — | 0 | 5.50 | — | — | — | — | — | — | — | |
| Lumley, Harry† | Canada | 1957–1960 | 77 | 35 | 33 | 9 | — | 6 | 3.16 | .903 | 8 | 3 | 5 | 0 | 3.02 | .897 | HOF 1980 |
| MacDonald, Joey | Canada | 2006–2007 | 7 | 2 | 2 | — | 1 | 0 | 2.68 | .918 | — | — | — | — | — | — | |
| McIntyre, Zane | United States | 2016–2017 | 8 | 0 | 4 | — | 1 | 0 | 3.97 | .858 | — | — | — | — | — | — | |
| Millar, Al | Canada | 1957–1958 | 6 | 1 | 4 | 1 | — | 0 | 4.17 | .863 | — | — | — | — | — | — | |
| Moffat, Mike | Canada | 1981–1984 | 18 | 7 | 6 | 2 | — | 0 | 4.38 | .826 | 11 | 6 | 5 | 0 | 3.45 | .869 | |
| Moog, Andy | Canada | 1987–1993 | 261 | 136 | 75 | 36 | — | 13 | 3.08 | .886 | 70 | 36 | 32 | 3 | 2.99 | .888 | |
| Norris, Jack | Canada | 1964–1965 | 23 | 10 | 11 | 2 | — | 1 | 3.70 | .898 | — | — | — | — | — | — | |
| Parent, Bernie† | Canada | 1965–1967 | 57 | 16 | 32 | 5 | — | 1 | 3.68 | .896 | — | — | — | — | — | — | HOF 1984 |
| Peeters, Pete | Canada | 1982–1986 | 171 | 91 | 58 | 16 | — | 9 | 3.00 | .883 | 21 | 9 | 12 | 1 | 3.57 | .870 | |
| Perreault, Bob | Canada | 1962–1963 | 22 | 3 | 12 | 7 | — | 1 | 3.83 | .893 | — | — | — | — | — | — | |
| Pettie, Jim | Canada | 1976–1979 | 21 | 9 | 7 | 2 | — | 1 | 3.68 | .855 | — | — | — | — | — | — | |
| Plante, Jacques† | Canada | 1972–1973 | 8 | 7 | 1 | 0 | — | 2 | 2.00 | .927 | 2 | 0 | 2 | 0 | 5.00 | .841 | HOF 1978 |
| Potvin, Felix | Canada | 2003–2004 | 28 | 12 | 8 | 6 | — | 4 | 2.51 | .903 | — | — | — | — | — | — | |
| Pronovost, Claude | Canada | 1955–1956 | 3 | 1 | 1 | 0 | — | 1 | 3.50 | .887 | — | — | — | — | — | — | |
| Ranford, Bill | Canada | 1985–1987; 1995–1997 | 122 | 52 | 49 | 14 | — | 6 | 3.19 | .891 | 8 | 1 | 7 | 0 | 3.87 | .853 | |
| Rask, Tuukka*† | Finland | 2007–2022 | 564 | 308 | 165 | — | 66 | 52 | 2.28 | .921 | 104 | 57 | 46 | 7 | 2.22 | .925 | SC 2011 |
| Raycroft, Andrew | Canada | 2000–2006 | 108 | 43 | 46 | 10 | 2 | 3 | 2.62 | .908 | 7 | 3 | 4 | 1 | 2.15 | .924 | |
| Redding, George | Canada | 1924–1925 | 1 | 0 | 0 | 0 | — | 0 | 5.45 | — | — | — | — | — | — | — | |
| Reece, Dave | United States | 1975–1976 | 14 | 7 | 5 | 2 | — | 2 | 3.32 | .877 | — | — | — | — | — | — | |
| Riendeau, Vincent | Canada | 1993–1995 | 29 | 10 | 12 | 2 | — | 1 | 3.00 | .879 | 2 | 1 | 1 | 0 | 4.00 | .810 | |
| Riggin, Pat | Canada | 1985–1987 | 49 | 20 | 16 | 9 | — | 1 | 3.37 | .871 | 1 | 0 | 1 | 0 | 3.00 | .870 | |
| Ring, Bob | United States | 1965–1966 | 1 | 0 | 0 | 0 | — | 0 | 7.24 | .810 | — | — | — | — | — | — | |
| Roberts, Maurice | United States | 1925–1926 | 2 | 1 | 1 | 0 | — | 0 | 3.53 | — | — | — | — | — | — | — | |
| Romano, Roberto | Canada | 1986–1987 | 1 | 0 | 1 | 0 | — | 0 | 6.00 | .824 | — | — | — | — | — | — | |
| Sauve, Philippe | United States | 2006–2007 | 2 | 0 | 0 | — | 0 | 0 | 5.80 | .826 | — | — | — | — | — | — | |
| Sawchuk, Terry† | Canada | 1955–1957 | 102 | 40 | 43 | 19 | — | 11 | 2.53 | .917 | — | — | — | — | — | — | HOF 1971 |
| Schafer, Paxton | Canada | 1996–1997 | 3 | 0 | 0 | 0 | — | 0 | 4.65 | .760 | — | — | — | — | — | — | |
| Shields, Steve | Canada | 2002–2003 | 36 | 12 | 13 | 9 | — | 0 | 2.76 | .896 | 2 | 0 | 2 | 0 | 3.03 | .897 | |
| Sigalet, Jordan | Canada | 2005–2006 | 1 | 0 | 0 | — | 0 | 0 | 0.00 | .000 | — | — | — | — | — | — | |
| Simmons, Don | Canada | 1956–1961 | 169 | 67 | 71 | 30 | — | 15 | 2.90 | .905 | 21 | 11 | 10 | 3 | 2.55 | .915 | |
| Skudra, Peter | Latvia | 2000–2001 | 25 | 6 | 12 | 1 | – | 0 | 3.33 | .879 | — | — | — | — | — | — | |
| Stewart, Charles | Canada | 1924–1927 | 77 | 30 | 41 | 5 | — | 10 | 2.45 | — | — | — | — | — | — | — | |
| Stewart, Jim | United States | 1979–1980 | 1 | 0 | 1 | 0 | — | 0 | 15.00 | .444 | — | — | — | — | — | — | |
| Subban, Malcolm | Canada | 2014–2017 | 2 | 0 | 2 | — | 0 | 0 | 5.82 | .727 | — | — | — | — | — | — | |
| Svedberg, Niklas | Sweden | 2013–2015 | 19 | 8 | 5 | — | 1 | 2 | 2.31 | .920 | — | — | — | — | — | — | |
| Swayman, Jeremy* | United States | 2020–2026 | 245 | 132 | 80 | — | 26 | 18 | 2.61 | .910 | 26 | 11 | 14 | 0 | 2.51 | .918 | |
| Sylvestri, Don | Canada | 1984–1985 | 3 | 0 | 0 | 2 | — | 0 | 3.53 | .885 | — | — | — | — | — | — | |
| Tallas, Robbie | Canada | 1995–2000 | 87 | 26 | 35 | 10 | — | 3 | 2.85 | .894 | — | — | — | — | — | — | |
| Thomas, Tim† | United States | 2002–2012 | 378 | 196 | 123 | 0 | 45 | 31 | 2.48 | .921 | 50 | 29 | 21 | 6 | 2.07 | .933 | SC 2011 |
| Thompson, Tiny† | Canada | 1928–1939 | 468 | 252 | 153 | 63 | — | 74 | 1.99 | — | 33 | 15 | 18 | 6 | 1.72 | — | HOF 1959, SC 1929 |
| Toivonen, Hannu | Finland | 2005–2007 | 38 | 12 | 14 | — | 5 | 1 | 3.33 | .896 | — | — | — | — | — | — | |
| Turco, Marty | Canada | 2011–2012 | 5 | 2 | 2 | — | 0 | 0 | 3.68 | .855 | — | — | — | — | — | — | |
| Ullmark, Linus | Sweden | 2021–2024 | 130 | 88 | 26 | — | 10 | 5 | 2.28 | .924 | 10 | 3 | 6 | 0 | 3.59 | .887 | |
| Vachon, Rogie† | Canada | 1980–1982 | 91 | 44 | 30 | 12 | — | 2 | 3.48 | .861 | 4 | 0 | 2 | 0 | 5.57 | .841 | HOF 2016 |
| Vladar, Dan | Czech Republic | 2019–2021 | 5 | 2 | 2 | — | 1 | 0 | 3.40 | .886 | 1 | 0 | 0 | 0 | 6.27 | .800 | |
| Whitmore, Kay | Canada | 2000–2001 | 5 | 1 | 2 | 0 | — | 0 | 5.33 | .809 | — | — | — | — | — | — | |
| Wilson, Lefty | Canada | 1957–1958 | 1 | 0 | 0 | 1 | — | 0 | 1.16 | .958 | — | — | — | — | — | — | |
| Winkler, Hal | Canada | 1926–1928 | 67 | 32 | 22 | 13 | — | 19 | 1.56 | — | 10 | 2 | 3 | 2 | 1.69 | — | |

== Skaters ==
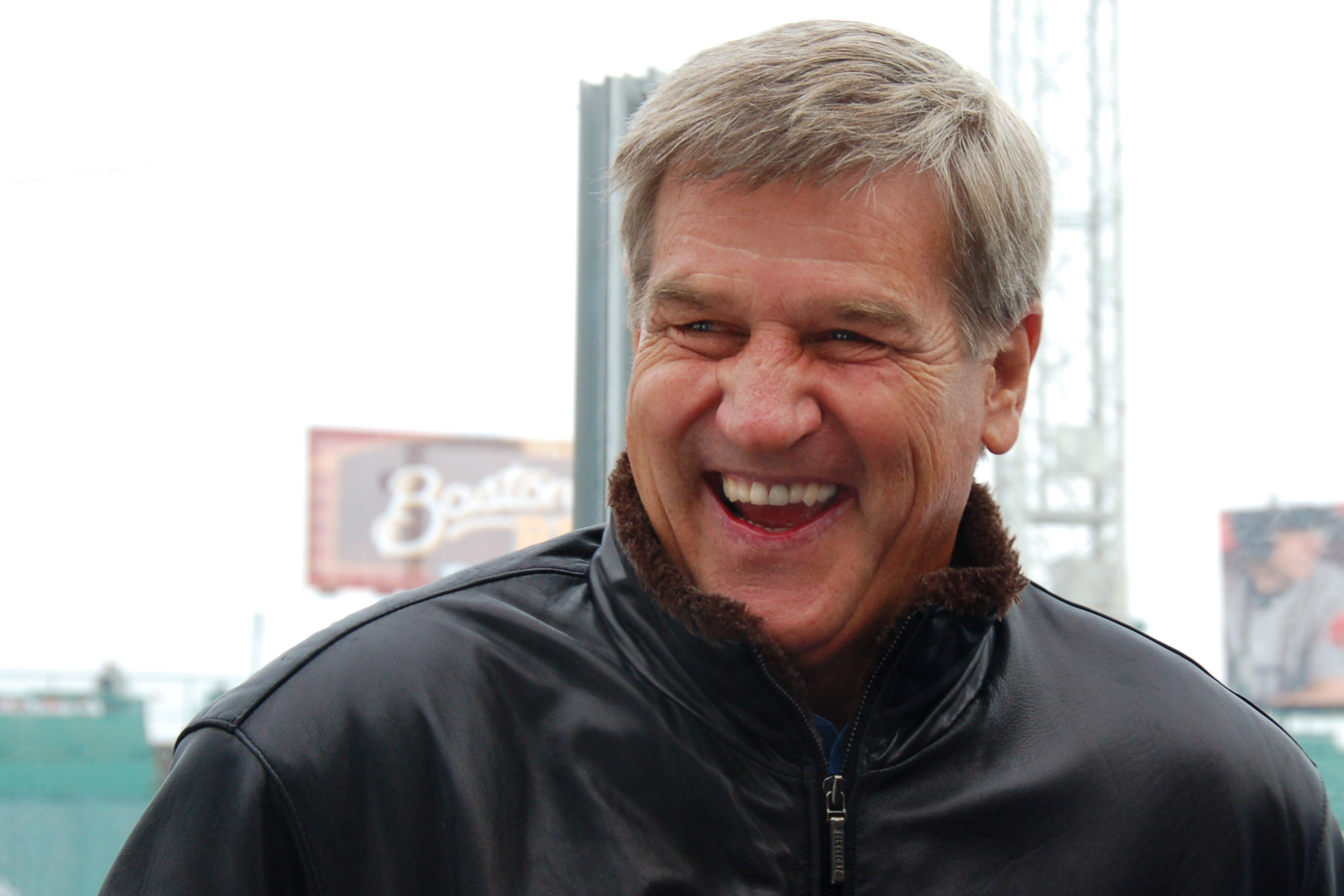
Bobby Orr

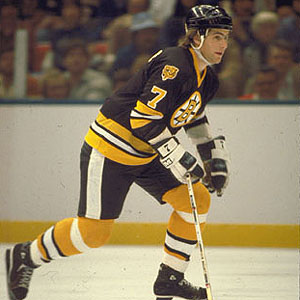
Ray Bourque

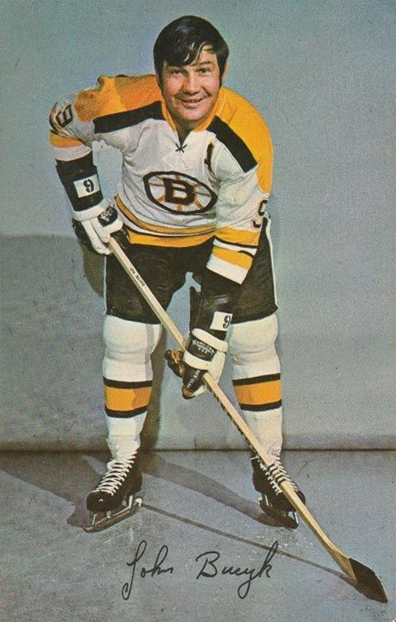
Johnny Bucyk

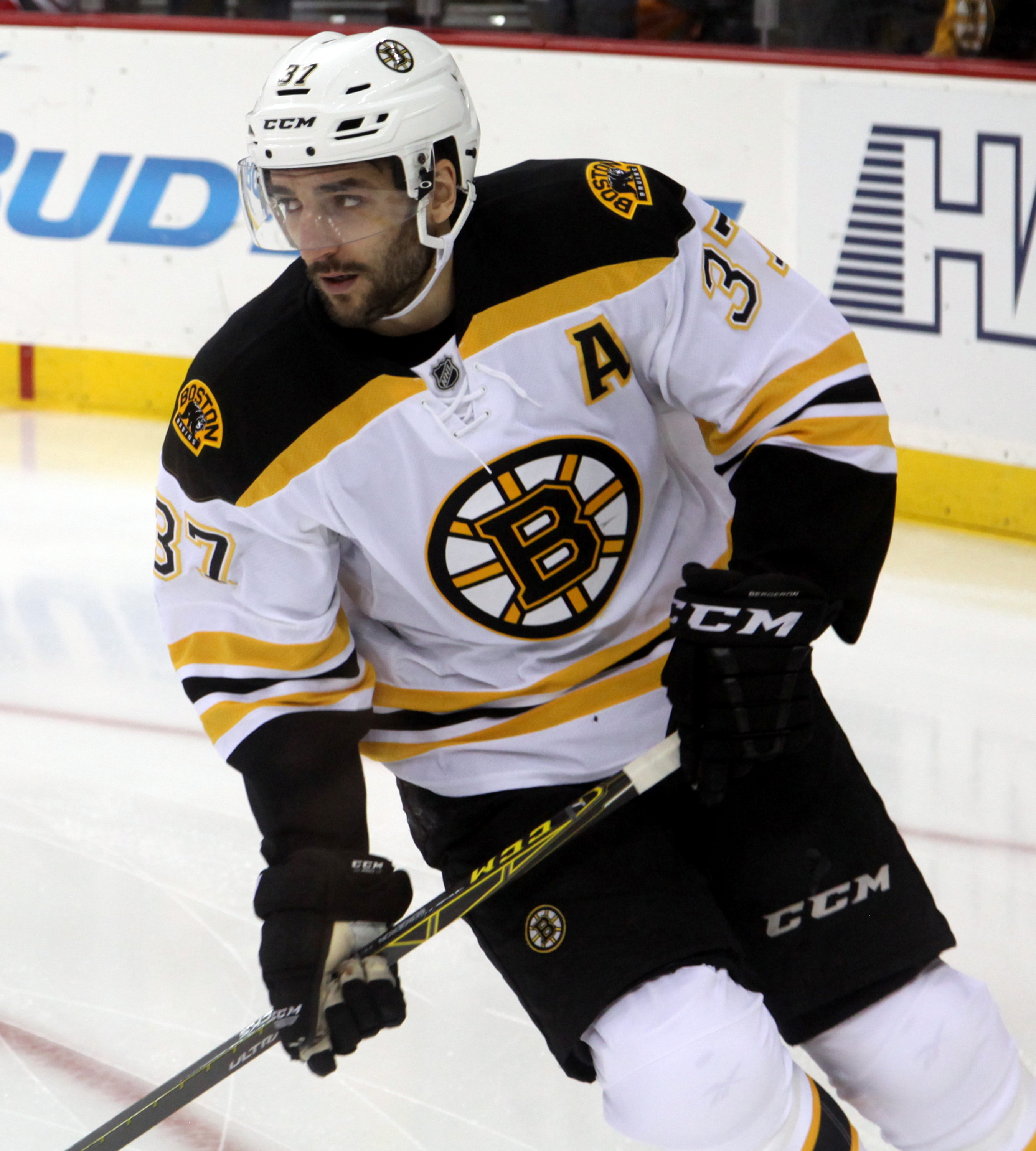
Patrice Bergeron

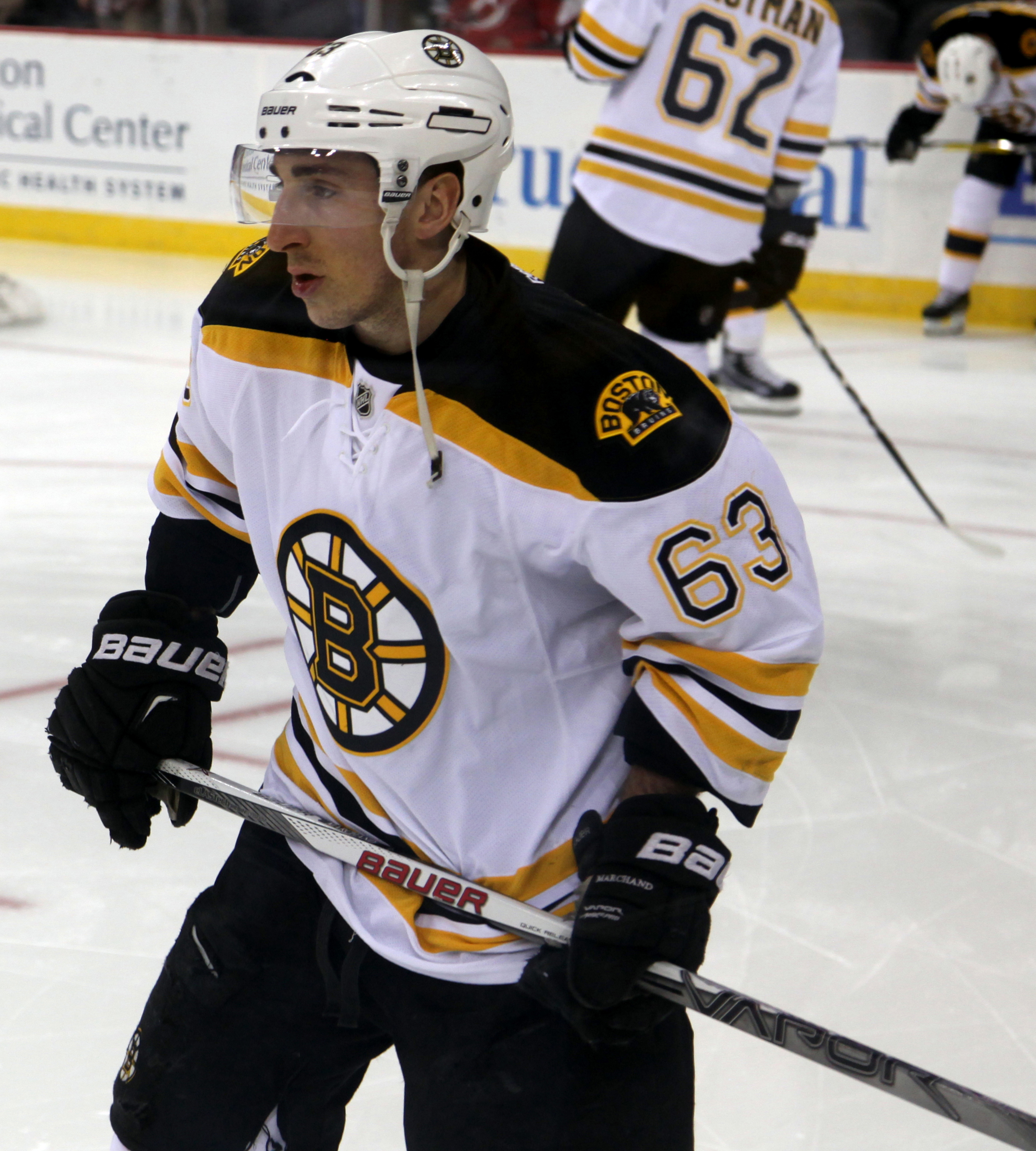
Brad Marchand

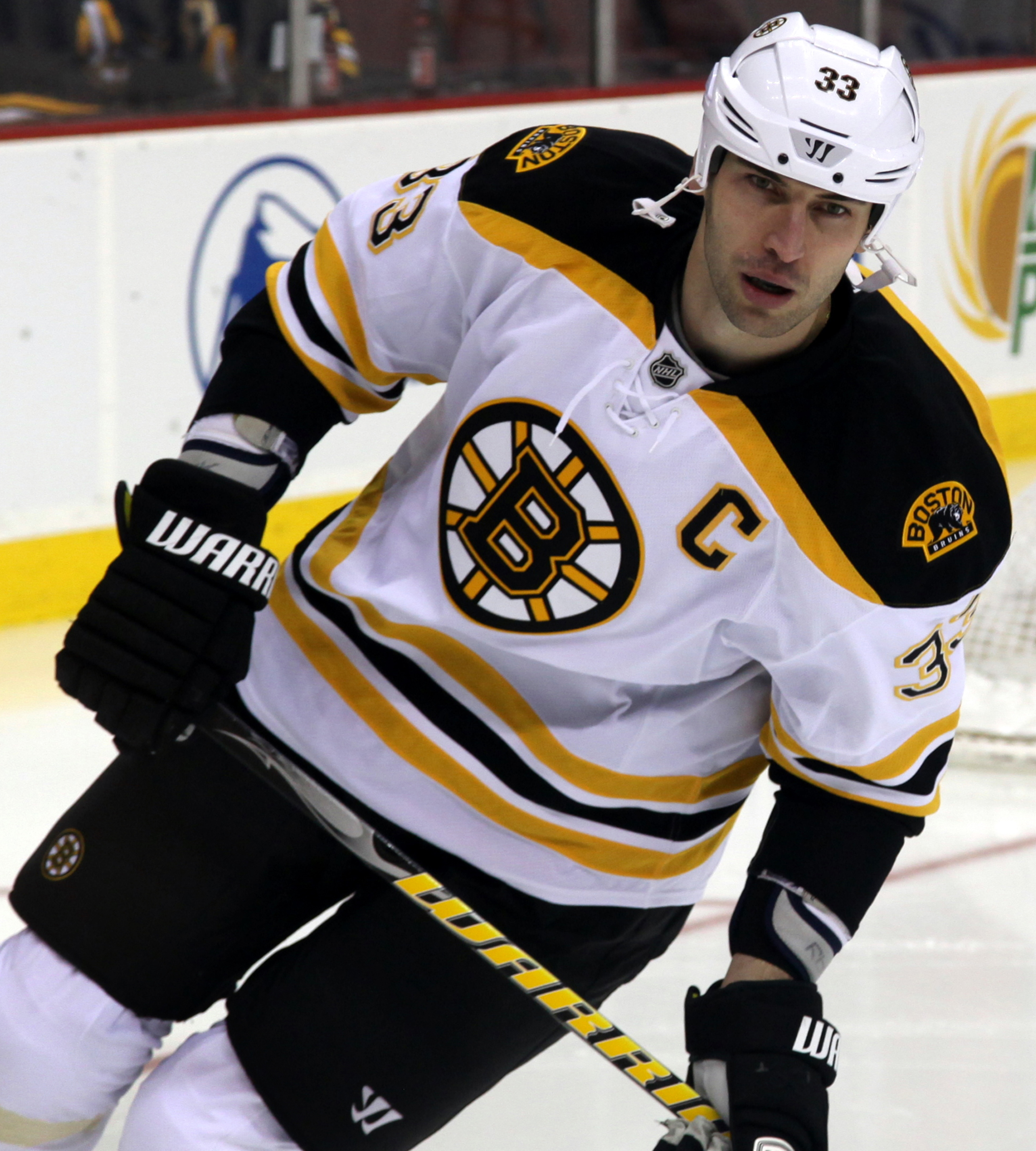
Zdeno Chara

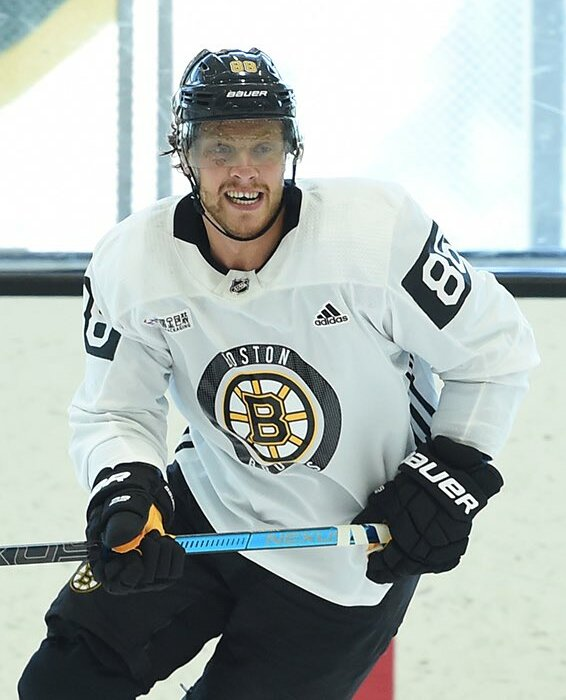
David Pastrňák

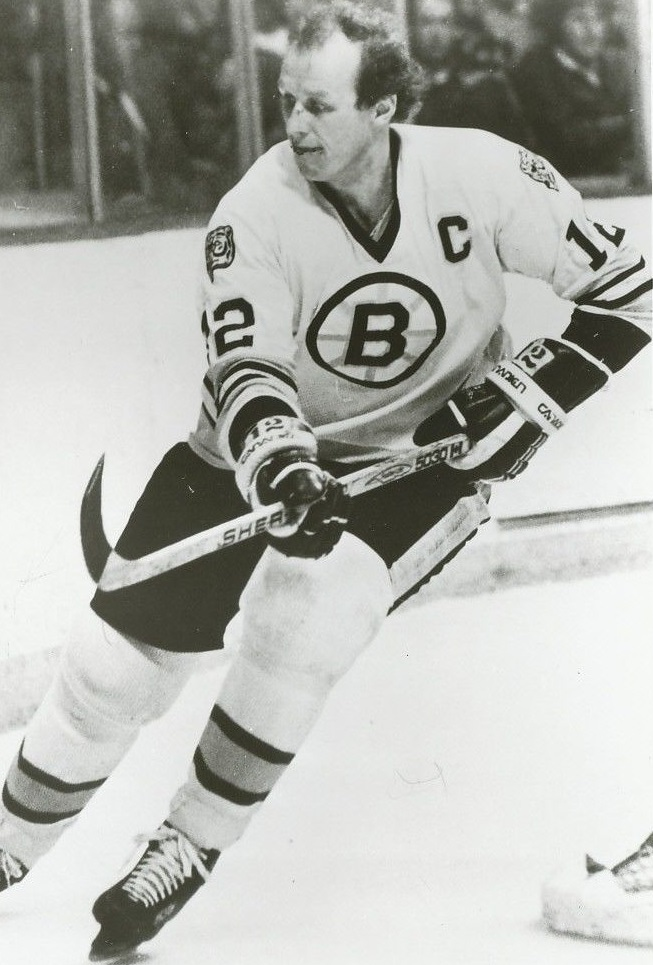
Wayne Cashman

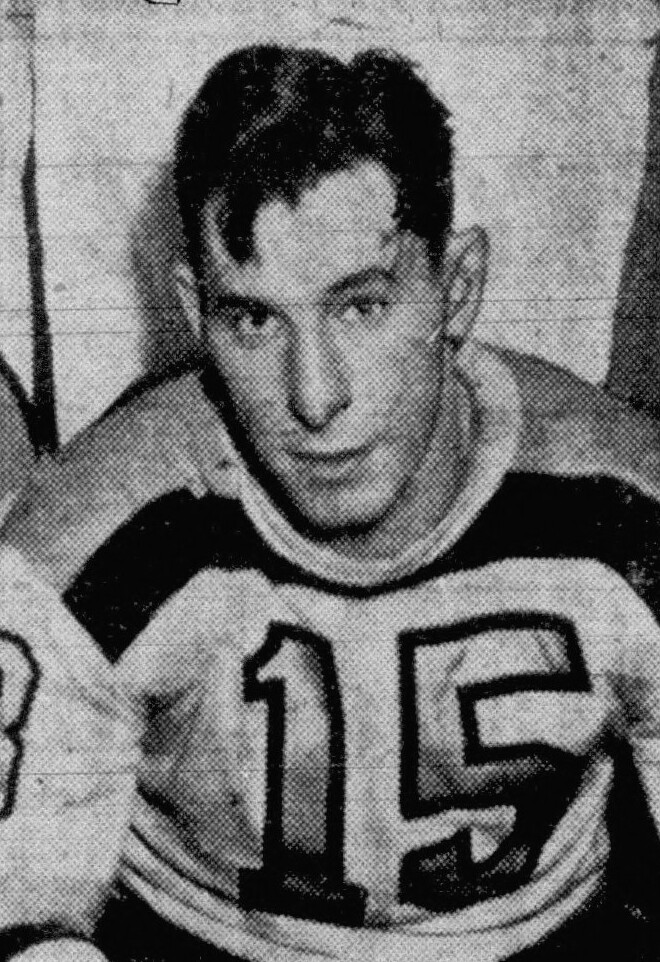
Milt Schmidt

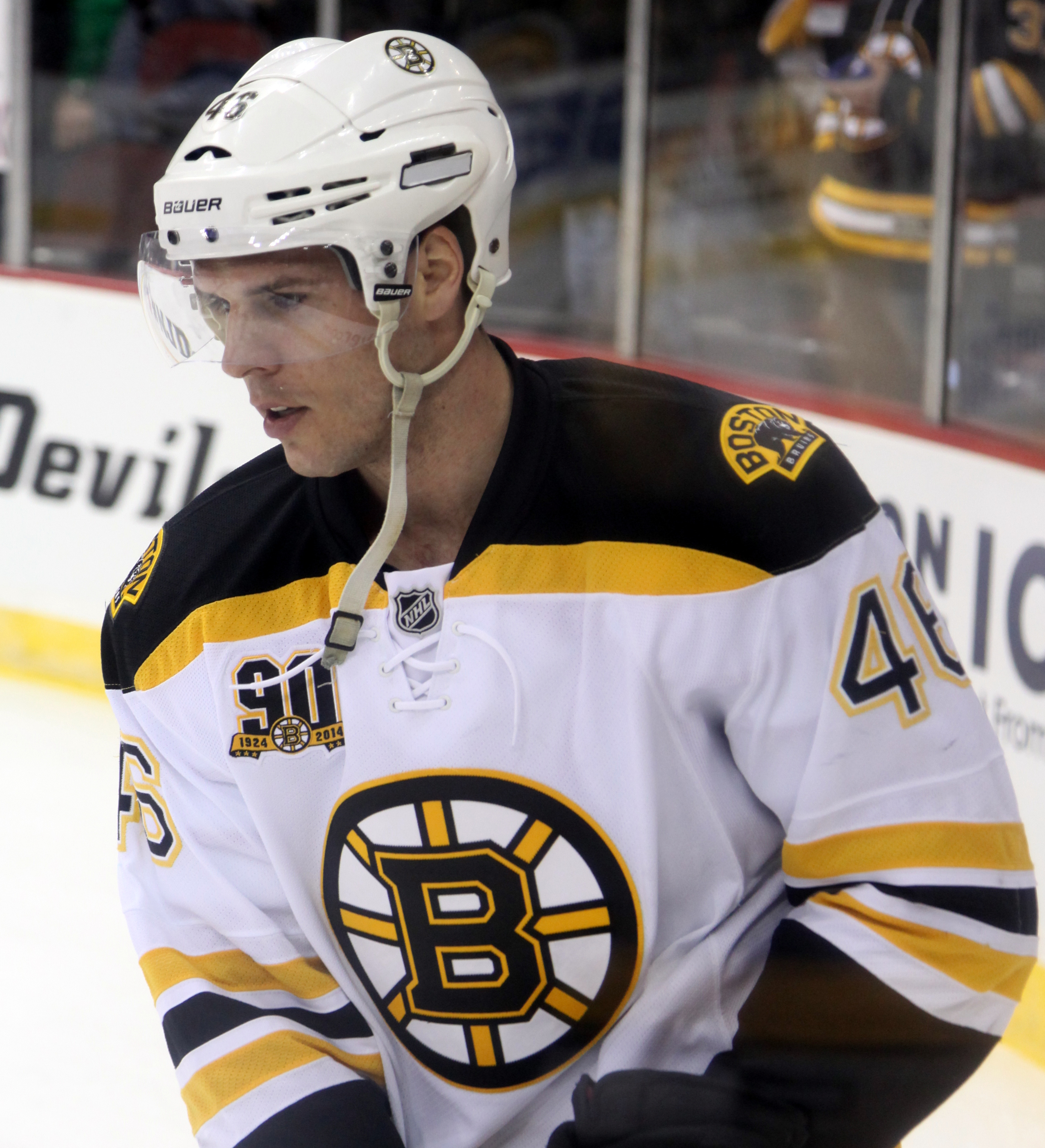
David Krejci

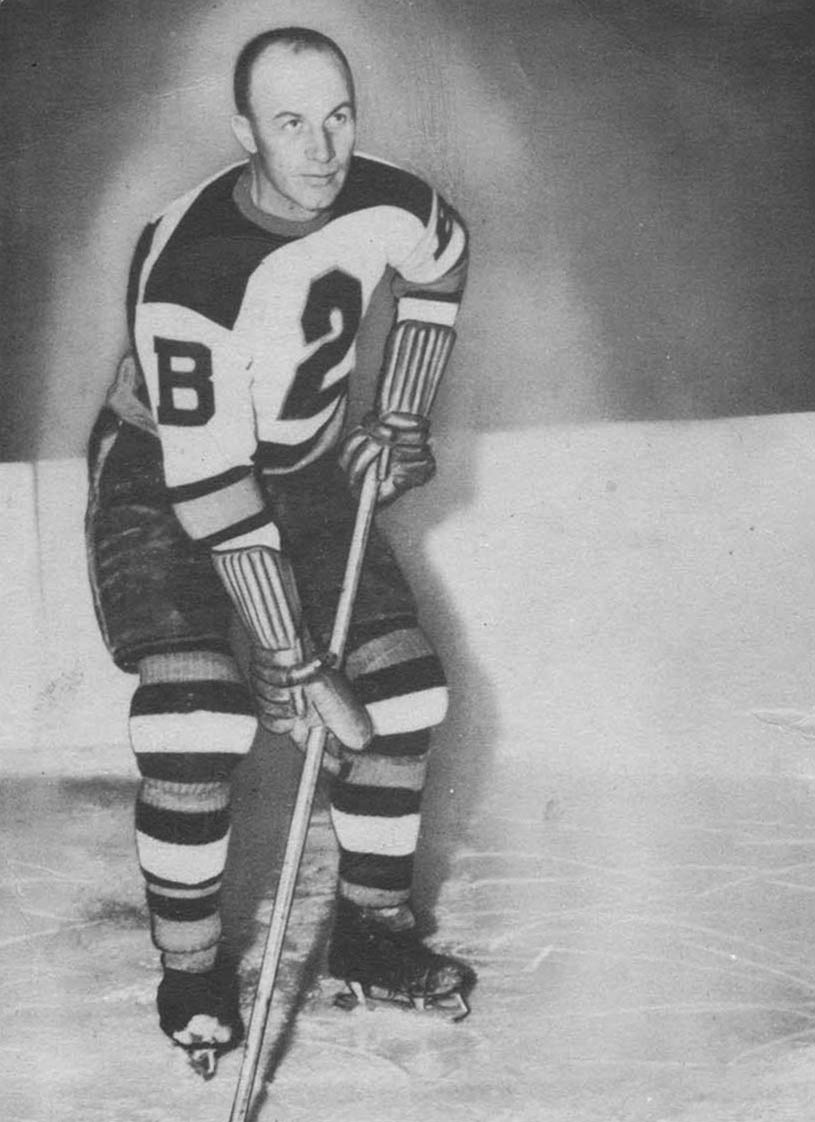
Eddie Shore

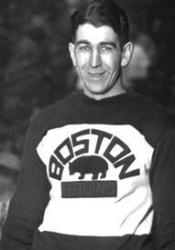
Lionel Hitchman

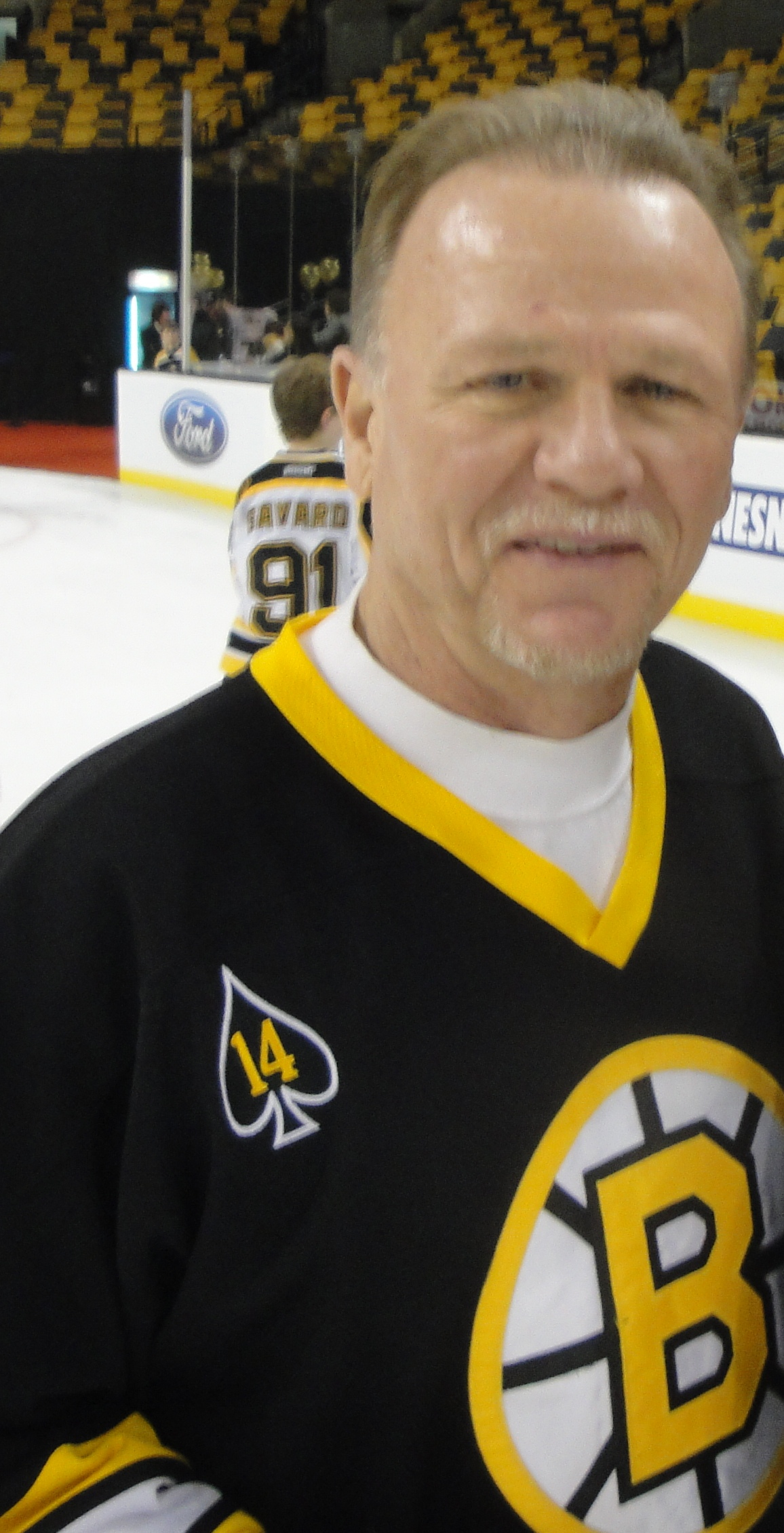
Rick Middleton

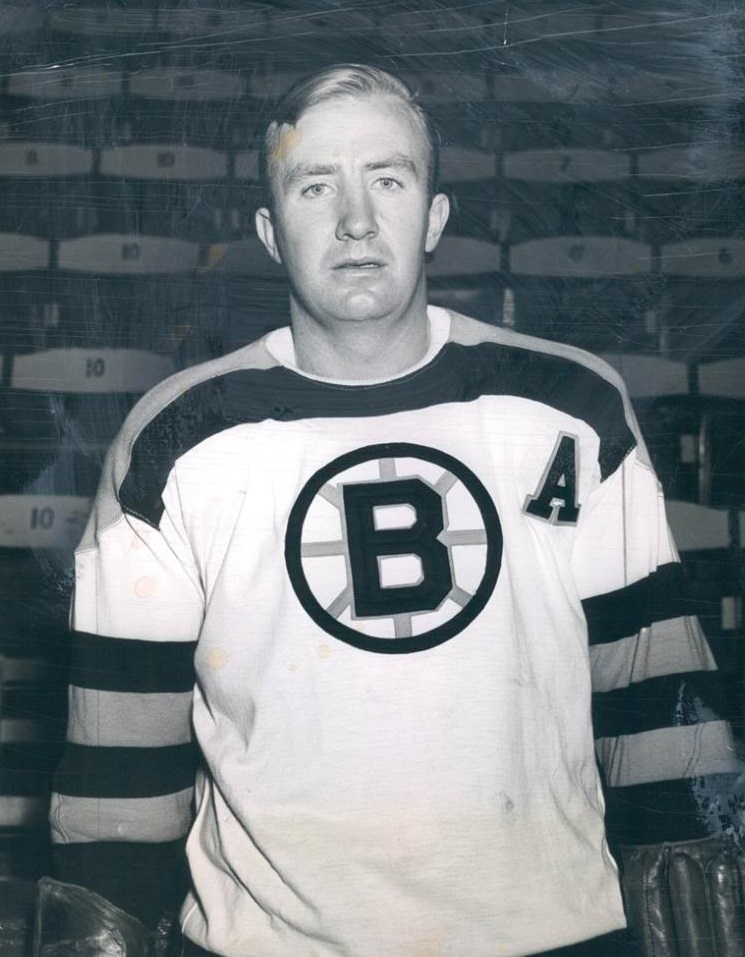
Bill Quakenbush

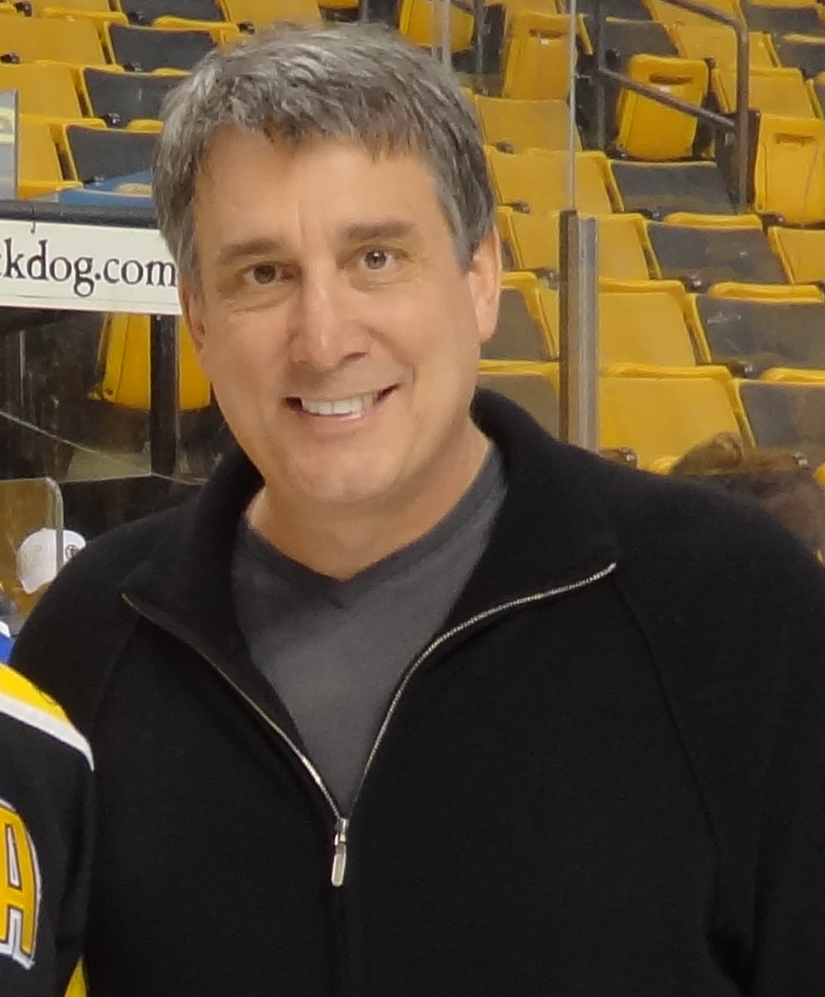
Cam Neely

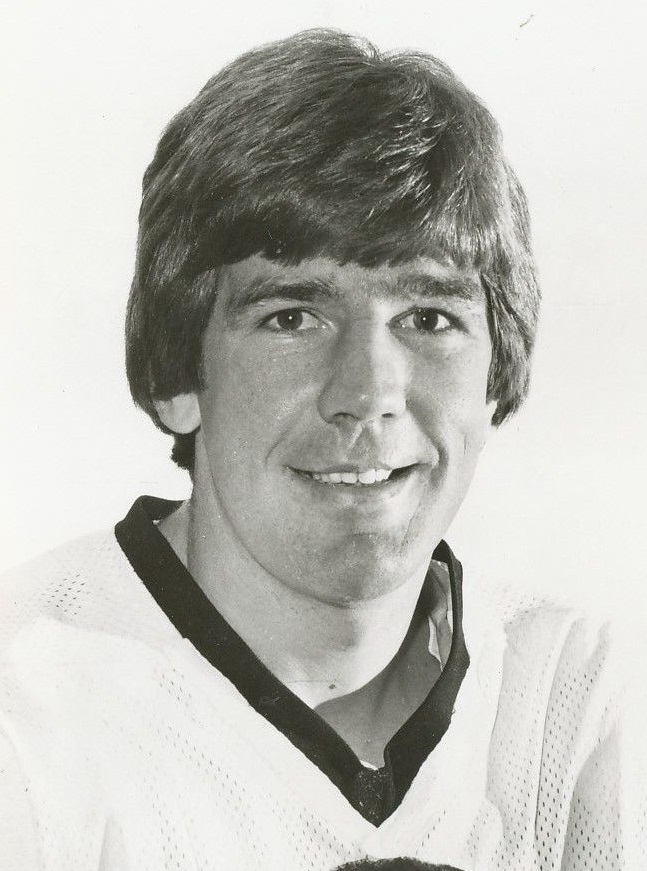
Teryy O’Rielly

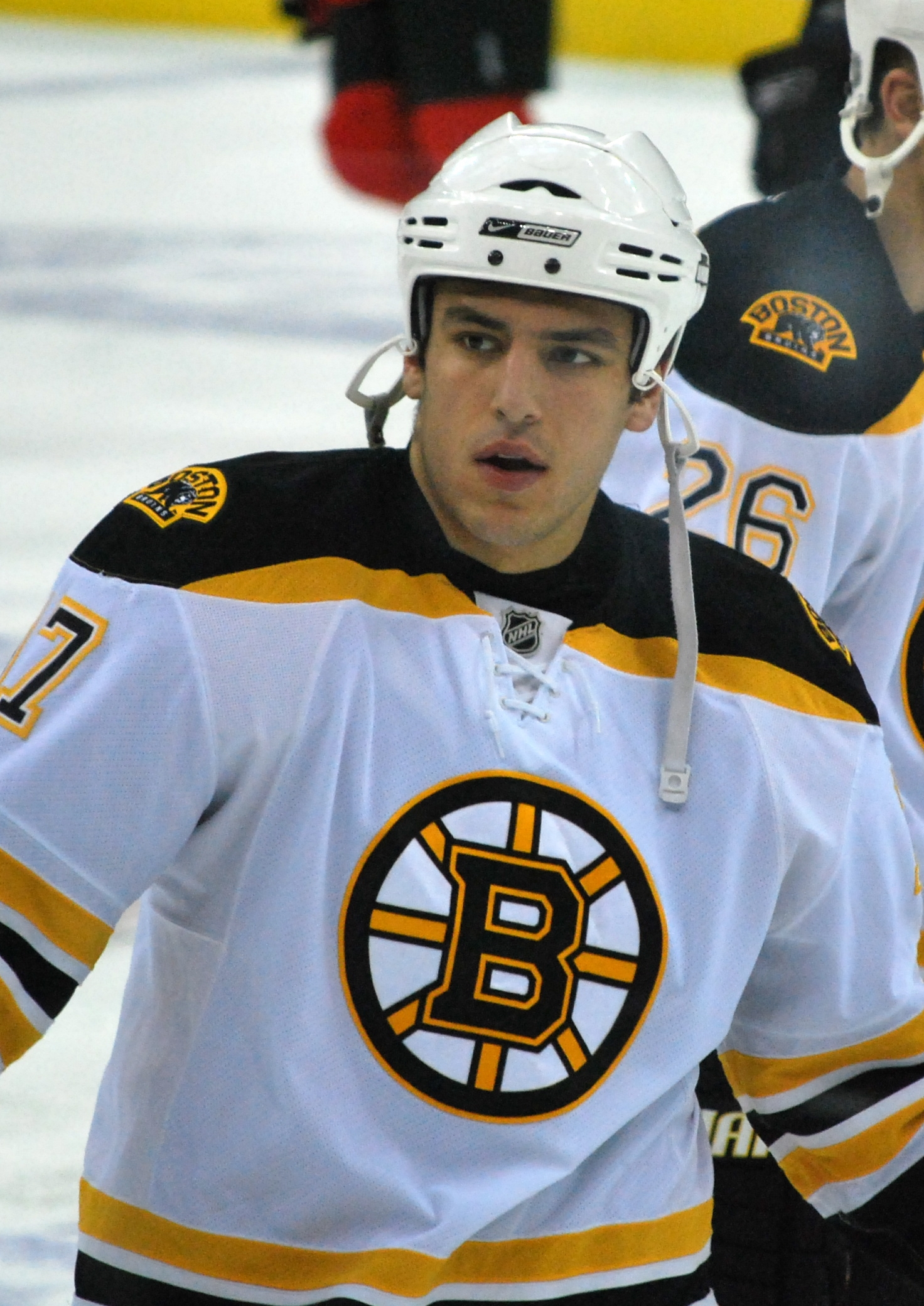
Milan Lucic

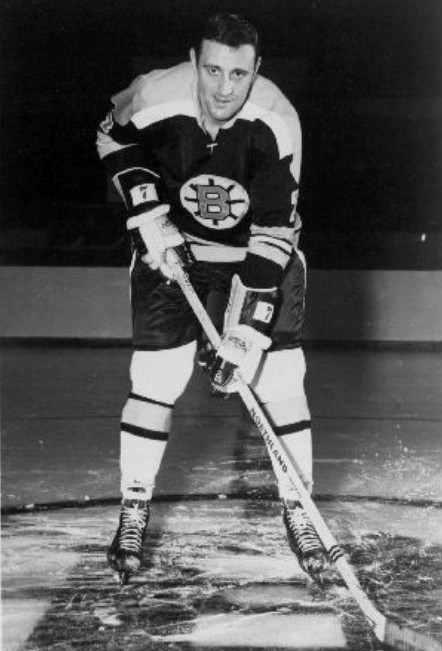
Phil Esposito

| Skater | Nat | Pos | Seasons | Regular season | | | | | Playoffs | | | | | Notes |
| Skater | Nat | Pos | Seasons | GP | G | A | P | PIM | GP | G | A | P | PIM | Notes |
|---|---|---|---|---|---|---|---|---|---|---|---|---|---|---|
| Acciari, Noel | United States | C | 2015–2019 | 180 | 18 | 13 | 31 | 80 | 34 | 4 | 3 | 7 | 4 | |
| Adduono, Rick | Canada | C | 1975–1976 | 1 | 0 | 0 | 0 | 0 | – | – | – | – | – | |
| Agostino, Kenny | United States | LW | 2017–2018 | 5 | 0 | 1 | 1 | 4 | – | – | – | – | – | |
| Ahcan, Jack | United States | D | 2020–2022 | 9 | 1 | 0 | 1 | 0 | – | – | – | – | – | |
| Aitken, Johnathan | Canada | D | 1999–2000 | 3 | 0 | 0 | 0 | 0 | – | – | – | – | – | |
| Alberts, Andrew | United States | D | 2005–2008 | 184 | 1 | 18 | 19 | 231 | 2 | 0 | 0 | 0 | 0 | |
| Aldcorn, Gary | Canada | LW | 1960–1961 | 24 | 2 | 3 | 5 | 12 | – | – | – | – | – | |
| Allen, Bobby | United States | D | 2006–2008 | 50 | 0 | 3 | 3 | 12 | – | – | – | – | – | |
| Allison, Jason | Canada | C | 1996–2001 | 301 | 105 | 189 | 294 | 242 | 18 | 4 | 15 | 19 | 10 | |
| Anderson, Red | Canada | D | 1942–1943 | – | – | – | – | – | 1 | 0 | 0 | 0 | 0 | |
| Anderson, Earl | United States | RW | 1974–1977 | 64 | 12 | 16 | 28 | 10 | 5 | 0 | 1 | 1 | 0 | |
| Andreychuk, Dave† | Canada | LW | 1999–2000 | 63 | 19 | 14 | 33 | 28 | – | – | – | – | – | HOF 2017 |
| Arbour, John | Canada | D | 1965–1968 | 6 | 0 | 1 | 1 | 11 | – | – | – | – | – | |
| Armstrong, Bob | Canada | D | 1950–1962 | 541 | 13 | 86 | 99 | 671 | 42 | 1 | 7 | 8 | 28 | |
| Arniel, Jamie | Canada | C | 2010–2011 | 1 | 0 | 0 | 0 | 0 | – | – | – | – | – | |
| Arniel, Scott | Canada | LW | 1991–1992 | 29 | 5 | 3 | 8 | 20 | – | – | – | – | – | |
| Arvidsson, Viktor* | Sweden | LW | 2025–2026 | 69 | 25 | 29 | 54 | 24 | 4 | 2 | 0 | 2 | 0 | |
| Ashbee, Barry | Canada | D | 1965–1966 | 14 | 0 | 3 | 3 | 14 | – | – | – | – | – | |
| Ashton, Brent | Canada | LW | 1991–1993 | 87 | 19 | 24 | 43 | 58 | – | – | – | – | – | |
| Aspirot, Jonathan* | Canada | D | 2025–2026 | 61 | 3 | 10 | 13 | 43 | 6 | 0 | 2 | 2 | 2 | |
| Atkinson, Steve | Canada | RW | 1968–1969 | 1 | 0 | 0 | 0 | 0 | – | – | – | – | – | |
| Aubuchon, Oscar | Canada | LW | 1942–1944 | 12 | 4 | 0 | 4 | 0 | 6 | 1 | 0 | 1 | 0 | |
| Awrey, Don | Canada | D | 1963–1973 | 543 | 21 | 87 | 108 | 830 | 54 | 0 | 11 | 11 | 132 | |
| Axelsson, P. J. | Sweden | LW | 1997–2009 | 797 | 103 | 184 | 287 | 276 | 54 | 4 | 3 | 7 | 24 | |
| Babando, Pete | United States | LW | 1947–1949 | 118 | 42 | 25 | 67 | 86 | 9 | 1 | 1 | 2 | 4 | |
| Backes, David | United States | C | 2016–2020 | 217 | 39 | 55 | 94 | 169 | 33 | 5 | 7 | 12 | 23 | |
| Bailey, Ace† | Canada | LW | 1968–1973 | 232 | 31 | 46 | 77 | 289 | 15 | 2 | 4 | 6 | 2 | SC 1972 |
| Balfour, Murray | Canada | RW | 1964–1965 | 15 | 0 | 2 | 2 | 26 | – | – | – | – | – | |
| Baluik, Stan | Canada | C | 1959–1960 | 7 | 0 | 0 | 0 | 2 | – | – | – | – | – | |
| Banks, Darren | Canada | LW | 1992–1994 | 20 | 2 | 2 | 4 | 73 | – | – | – | – | – | |
| Barahona, Ralph | United States | C | 1990–1992 | 6 | 2 | 2 | 4 | 0 | – | – | – | – | – | |
| Barr, Dave | Canada | RW | 1981–1983 | 12 | 1 | 1 | 2 | 7 | 15 | 1 | 0 | 1 | 2 | |
| Barry, Ed | Canada | LW | 1946–1947 | 19 | 1 | 3 | 4 | 2 | – | – | – | – | – | |
| Barry, Marty† | Canada | C | 1929–1935 | 279 | 129 | 89 | 218 | 167 | 20 | 6 | 6 | 12 | 26 | HOF 1965, SC 1936, SC 1937 |
| Barry, Ray | United States | C | 1951–1952 | 18 | 1 | 2 | 3 | 6 | – | – | – | – | – | |
| Bartkowski, Matt | United States | D | 2010–2015 | 131 | 0 | 24 | 24 | 77 | 15 | 1 | 2 | 3 | 14 | |
| Bartlett, Jim | Canada | LW | 1960–1961 | 63 | 15 | 9 | 24 | 95 | – | – | – | – | – | |
| Bates, Shawn | United States | C | 1997–2001 | 135 | 14 | 14 | 28 | 44 | 12 | 0 | 0 | 0 | 4 | |
| Bauer, Bobby† | Canada | RW | 1936–1952 | 328 | 123 | 136 | 259 | 38 | 48 | 11 | 8 | 19 | 6 | HOF 1996, SC 1939, SC 1941 |
| Baumgartner, Ken | Canada | LW | 1997–1999 | 151 | 1 | 4 | 5 | 318 | 9 | 0 | 0 | 0 | 14 | |
| Beattie, Jack | Canada | LW | 1930–1938 | 286 | 58 | 79 | 137 | 124 | 19 | 2 | 0 | 2 | 6 | |
| Beckett, Bob | Canada | C | 1956–1964 | 68 | 7 | 6 | 13 | 18 | – | – | – | – | – | |
| Beddoes, Clayton | Canada | C | 1995–1997 | 60 | 2 | 8 | 10 | 57 | – | – | – | – | – | |
| Beecher, John* | Canada | C | 2023–2026 | 136 | 11 | 11 | 22 | 50 | 12 | 1 | 1 | 2 | 2 | |
| Beers, Bob | United States | D | 1989–1992; 1996–1997 | 77 | 3 | 11 | 14 | 53 | 21 | 1 | 1 | 2 | 22 | |
| Begin, Steve | Canada | C | 2009–2010 | 77 | 5 | 9 | 14 | 53 | 13 | 1 | 0 | 1 | 10 | |
| Belanger, Ken | Canada | LW | 1998–2001 | 122 | 5 | 8 | 13 | 317 | 12 | 1 | 0 | 1 | 16 | |
| Beleskey, Matt | Canada | C | 2015–2018 | 143 | 18 | 27 | 45 | 129 | 3 | 0 | 0 | 0 | 4 | |
| Bennett, Bill | United States | LW | 1978–1979 | 7 | 1 | 4 | 5 | 2 | – | – | – | – | – | |
| Benson, Bobby | Canada | D | 1924–1925 | 8 | 0 | 2 | 2 | 4 | – | – | – | – | – | |
| Beraldo, Paul | Canada | RW | 1987–1989 | 10 | 0 | 0 | 0 | 4 | – | – | – | – | – | |
| Berard, Bryan | United States | D | 2002–2003 | 80 | 10 | 28 | 38 | 64 | 3 | 1 | 0 | 1 | 2 | |
| Bergdinon, Fred | Canada | RW | 1925–1926 | 2 | 0 | 0 | 0 | 0 | – | – | – | – | – | |
| Bergeron, Patrice† | Canada | C | 2003–2023 | 1294 | 427 | 613 | 1040 | 494 | 170 | 50 | 78 | 128 | 96 | SC 2011 |
| Bertuzzi, Tyler | Canada | LW | 2022–2023 | 21 | 4 | 12 | 16 | 6 | 7 | 5 | 5 | 10 | 26 | |
| Besler, Phil | Canada | RW | 1935–1936 | 30 | 1 | 4 | 5 | 18 | – | – | – | – | – | |
| Bettio, Silvio | Canada | LW | 1949–1950 | 44 | 9 | 12 | 21 | 34 | – | – | – | – | – | |
| Beverley, Nick | Canada | D | 1966–1974 | 82 | 1 | 10 | 11 | 28 | – | – | – | – | – | |
| Bionda, Jack | Canada | C | 1956–1959 | 80 | 3 | 8 | 11 | 93 | 11 | 0 | 1 | 1 | 14 | |
| Bitz, Byron | Canada | RW | 2008–2010 | 80 | 8 | 8 | 16 | 49 | 5 | 1 | 1 | 2 | 2 | |
| Bjork, Anders | United States | LW | 2017–2021 | 138 | 16 | 23 | 39 | 28 | 10 | 0 | 1 | 1 | 6 | |
| Blackburn, Don | Canada | LW | 1962–1963 | 6 | 0 | 5 | 5 | 4 | – | – | – | – | – | |
| Blake, Bob | United States | C | 1935–1936 | 12 | 0 | 0 | 0 | 0 | – | – | – | – | – | |
| Blatny, Zdenek | Czech Republic | LW | 2005–2006 | 5 | 0 | 0 | 0 | 2 | – | – | – | – | – | |
| Blidh, Anton | Sweden | LW | 2016–2022 | 70 | 4 | 8 | 12 | 37 | – | – | – | – | – | |
| Blum, John | United States | D | 1983–1990 | 169 | 5 | 22 | 27 | 443 | 14 | 0 | 1 | 1 | 23 | |
| Blumel, Matej* | Czech Republic | RW | 2025–2026 | 4 | 0 | 0 | 0 | 0 | – | – | – | – | – | |
| Bochenski, Brandon | United States | C | 2006–2008 | 51 | 11 | 17 | 28 | 20 | – | – | – | – | – | |
| Bodnar, Gus | Canada | C | 1953–1955 | 82 | 7 | 7 | 14 | 22 | 6 | 0 | 1 | 1 | 4 | |
| Bodnarchuk, Andrew | Canada | D | 2009–2010 | 5 | 0 | 0 | 0 | 2 | – | – | – | – | – | |
| Boivin, Leo† | Canada | D | 1954–1966 | 717 | 47 | 164 | 211 | 768 | 34 | 3 | 9 | 12 | 45 | HOF 1986 |
| Boldirev, Ivan | Canada | C | 1970–1972 | 13 | 0 | 2 | 2 | 6 | – | – | – | – | – | |
| Boll, Buzz | Canada | C | 1942–1944 | 82 | 44 | 52 | 96 | 22 | – | – | – | – | – | |
| Bonin, Marcel | Canada | C | 1955–1956 | 67 | 9 | 9 | 18 | 49 | – | – | – | – | – | |
| Bonvie, Dennis | Canada | C | 2001–2002 | 23 | 1 | 2 | 3 | 84 | 1 | 0 | 0 | 0 | 0 | |
| Boone, Buddy | Canada | RW | 1956–1958 | 34 | 5 | 3 | 8 | 28 | 22 | 2 | 1 | 3 | 27 | |
| Boqvist, Jesper | Sweden | C | 2023–2024 | 47 | 6 | 8 | 14 | 8 | 8 | 0 | 1 | 1 | 0 | |
| Boucher, Billy | Canada | RW | 1926–1927 | 16 | 2 | 0 | 2 | 14 | 8 | 0 | 0 | 0 | 2 | |
| Bourque, Chris | United States | LW | 2012–2013 | 18 | 1 | 3 | 4 | 6 | – | – | – | – | – | |
| Bourque, Ray† | Canada | D | 1979–2000 | 1518 | 395 | 1111 | 1506 | 1087 | 180 | 36 | 125 | 161 | 151 | HOF 2004 |
| Boutilier, Paul | Canada | D | 1986–1987 | 52 | 5 | 9 | 14 | 84 | – | – | – | – | – | |
| Boychuk, Johnny | Canada | D | 2008–2014 | 317 | 19 | 56 | 75 | 198 | 79 | 13 | 14 | 27 | 34 | |
| Boyd, Irwin | United States | RW | 1931–1944 | 55 | 8 | 7 | 15 | 15 | 5 | 0 | 1 | 1 | 4 | |
| Boyes, Brad | Canada | RW | 2005–2007 | 144 | 39 | 64 | 103 | 55 | – | – | – | – | – | |
| Boynton, Nick | Canada | D | 1999–2006 | 299 | 22 | 62 | 84 | 397 | 18 | 1 | 5 | 6 | 14 | |
| Brackenborough, John | Canada | LW/C | 1925–1926 | 7 | 0 | 0 | 0 | 0 | – | – | – | – | – | |
| Bradley, Bart | Canada | C | 1949–1950 | 1 | 0 | 0 | 0 | 0 | – | – | – | – | – | |
| Brazeau, Justin | Canada | F | 2023–2025 | 76 | 15 | 12 | 27 | 18 | 9 | 1 | 1 | 2 | 12 | |
| Brennan, Rich | United States | D | 2002–2003 | 7 | 0 | 1 | 1 | 6 | – | – | – | – | – | |
| Brennan, Tom | United States | RW | 1943–1945 | 12 | 2 | 2 | 4 | 2 | – | – | – | – | – | |
| Brickley, Andy | United States | LW/C | 1988–1992 | 177 | 37 | 76 | 113 | 38 | 12 | 0 | 2 | 2 | 0 | |
| Briden, Archie | Canada | LW | 1926–1927 | 17 | 1 | 1 | 2 | 4 | – | – | – | – | – | |
| Brookbank, Wade | Canada | D | 2006–2007 | 7 | 1 | 0 | 1 | 15 | – | – | – | – | – | |
| Brown, Adam | Canada | LW | 1951–1952 | 33 | 8 | 9 | 17 | 6 | – | – | – | – | – | |
| Brown, Josh | Canada | D | 2021–2022 | 6 | 0 | 0 | 0 | 5 | 1 | 0 | 0 | 0 | 0 | |
| Brown, Patrick | United States | C | 2023–2025 | 26 | 0 | 2 | 2 | 10 | 1 | 0 | 0 | 0 | 2 | |
| Brown, Sean | Canada | D | 2001–2003 | 81 | 1 | 6 | 7 | 164 | 4 | 0 | 0 | 0 | 2 | |
| Brown, Wayne | Canada | RW | 1953–1954 | – | – | – | – | – | 4 | 0 | 0 | 0 | 0 | |
| Bruce, Gordie† | Canada | LW | 1940–1946 | 27 | 4 | 9 | 13 | 13 | 7 | 2 | 3 | 5 | 4 | SC 1941 |
| Brunet, Frederic | Canada | D | 2024–2025 | 1 | 0 | 0 | 0 | 0 | – | – | – | – | – | |
| Buchanan, Ron | Canada | C | 1966–1967 | 3 | 0 | 0 | 0 | 0 | – | – | – | – | – | |
| Bucyk, Johnny† | Canada | LW | 1957–1978 | 1436 | 545 | 794 | 1339 | 436 | 109 | 40 | 60 | 100 | 34 | HOF 1981, SC 1970, SC 1972 |
| Burch, Billy† | United States | C/LW | 1932–1933 | 25 | 3 | 1 | 4 | 4 | – | – | – | – | – | HOF 1974 |
| Burke, Eddie | Canada | RW/C | 1931–1932 | 16 | 3 | 0 | 3 | 12 | – | – | – | – | – | |
| Burns, Charlie | United States | C | 1959–1963 | 262 | 48 | 70 | 118 | 122 | – | – | – | – | – | |
| Burridge, Randy | Canada | LW | 1985–1991 | 359 | 108 | 115 | 223 | 275 | 78 | 12 | 30 | 42 | 91 | |
| Byce, John | United States | C | 1989–1992 | 21 | 2 | 3 | 5 | 6 | 8 | 2 | 0 | 2 | 2 | |
| Byers, Gordie | Canada | D | 1949–1950 | 1 | 0 | 1 | 1 | 0 | – | – | – | – | – | |
| Byers, Lyndon | Canada | RW | 1983–1992 | 261 | 24 | 42 | 66 | 959 | 37 | 2 | 2 | 4 | 96 | |
| Caffery, Jack | Canada | C | 1956–1958 | 54 | 3 | 2 | 5 | 22 | 10 | 1 | 0 | 1 | 4 | |
| Cahill, Charles | Canada | RW | 1925–1927 | 31 | 0 | 1 | 1 | 9 | – | – | – | – | – | |
| Cain, Herb† | Canada | LW | 1939–1946 | 316 | 140 | 118 | 258 | 81 | 45 | 14 | 11 | 25 | 9 | SC 1941 |
| Calladine, Norm | Canada | C | 1942–1945 | 63 | 19 | 29 | 48 | 8 | – | – | – | – | – | |
| Callahan, Michael* | United States | D | 2024–2026 | 22 | 1 | 0 | 1 | 7 | – | – | – | – | – | |
| Campbell, Gregory† | Canada | C | 2010–2015 | 358 | 39 | 52 | 91 | 306 | 59 | 4 | 9 | 13 | 19 | SC 2011 |
| Campbell, Wade | Canada | D | 1985–1988 | 28 | 0 | 4 | 4 | 60 | 4 | 0 | 0 | 0 | 11 | |
| Camper, Carter | United States | C | 2011–2012 | 3 | 1 | 0 | 1 | 0 | – | – | – | – | – | |
| Capuano, Jack | United States | D | 1991–1992 | 2 | 0 | 0 | 0 | 0 | – | – | – | – | – | |
| Carey, Paul | United States | C | 2018–2020 | 3 | 0 | 0 | 0 | 0 | – | – | – | – | – | |
| Carleton, Wayne† | Canada | LW | 1969–1971 | 111 | 28 | 43 | 71 | 67 | 18 | 2 | 4 | 6 | 14 | SC 1970 |
| Carlo, Brandon | United States | D | 2016–2025 | 617 | 29 | 80 | 109 | 331 | 72 | 5 | 9 | 14 | 34 | |
| Caron, Jordan | Canada | C | 2010–2015 | 134 | 12 | 16 | 28 | 76 | 9 | 1 | 0 | 1 | 4 | |
| Carpenter, Bob | United States | C | 1988–1992 | 187 | 63 | 71 | 134 | 175 | 38 | 5 | 9 | 14 | 51 | |
| Carrick, Connor | United States | D | 2022–2023 | 1 | 0 | 1 | 1 | 0 | – | – | – | – | – | |
| Carroll, George | Canada | D | 1924–1925 | 10 | 0 | 0 | 0 | 7 | – | – | – | – | – | |
| Carson, Bill† | Canada | C | 1928–1930 | 64 | 11 | 9 | 20 | 36 | 11 | 3 | 0 | 3 | 14 | |
| Carter, Anson | Canada | RW | 1996–2000 | 211 | 70 | 73 | 143 | 69 | 18 | 5 | 4 | 9 | 0 | |
| Carter, Billy | Canada | C | 1960–1961 | 8 | 0 | 0 | 0 | 0 | – | – | – | – | – | |
| Carter, John | United States | LW | 1985–1991 | 185 | 33 | 41 | 74 | 120 | 31 | 7 | 5 | 12 | 51 | |
| Carveth, Joe | Canada | RW | 1946–1948 | 73 | 29 | 24 | 53 | 20 | 5 | 2 | 1 | 3 | 0 | |
| Cashman, Wayne† | Canada | LW | 1964–1983 | 1027 | 277 | 516 | 793 | 1039 | 145 | 31 | 57 | 88 | 250 | SC 1970, SC 1972 |
| Cave, Colby | Canada | C | 2017–2019 | 23 | 1 | 4 | 5 | 10 | – | – | – | – | – | |
| Cehlarik, Peter | Slovakia | LW | 2016–2020 | 40 | 5 | 6 | 11 | 10 | – | – | – | – | – | |
| Chamberlain, Murph | Canada | LW | 1942–1943 | 45 | 9 | 24 | 33 | 67 | 6 | 1 | 1 | 2 | 12 | |
| Chapman, Art | Canada | C | 1930–1934 | 159 | 24 | 29 | 53 | 61 | 10 | 0 | 1 | 1 | 9 | |
| Chara, Zdeno† | Slovakia | D | 2006–2020 | 1023 | 148 | 333 | 481 | 1055 | 150 | 15 | 41 | 56 | 159 | SC 2011 |
| Cherry, Dick | Canada | D | 1956–1957 | 6 | 0 | 0 | 0 | 4 | – | – | – | – | – | |
| Cherry, Don | Canada | D | 1954–1955 | – | – | – | – | – | 1 | 0 | 0 | 0 | 0 | |
| Chervyakov, Denis | Russia | D | 1992–1993 | 2 | 0 | 0 | 0 | 2 | – | – | – | – | – | |
| Chevrefils, Real | Canada | LW | 1951–1959 | 349 | 101 | 93 | 194 | 161 | 30 | 5 | 4 | 9 | 20 | |
| Chisholm, Art | United States | C/D | 1960–1961 | 3 | 0 | 0 | 0 | 0 | – | – | – | – | – | |
| Chistov, Stanislav | Russia | LW | 2006–2007 | 60 | 5 | 8 | 13 | 36 | – | – | – | – | – | |
| Christian, Dave | United States | RW | 1989–1991 | 128 | 44 | 38 | 82 | 49 | 40 | 12 | 5 | 17 | 8 | |
| Church, Jack | Canada | D | 1945–1946 | 43 | 2 | 6 | 8 | 28 | 9 | 0 | 0 | 0 | 4 | |
| Chynoweth, Dean | Canada | D | 1995–1998 | 94 | 2 | 8 | 10 | 259 | 4 | 0 | 0 | 0 | 24 | |
| Cimetta, Rob | Canada | LW/RW | 1988–1990 | 54 | 10 | 9 | 19 | 33 | 1 | 0 | 0 | 0 | 15 | |
| Clapper, Dit† | Canada | RW/D | 1927–1947 | 835 | 229 | 248 | 477 | 452 | 82 | 13 | 16 | 29 | 50 | HOF 1947, SC 1929, SC 1939, SC 1941 |
| Clark, Gordie | Canada | RW | 1974–1976 | 8 | 0 | 1 | 1 | 0 | 1 | 0 | 0 | 0 | 0 | |
| Clark, Nobby | Canada | D | 1927–1928 | 2 | 0 | 0 | 0 | 0 | – | – | – | – | – | |
| Cleghorn, Sprague† | Canada | D | 1925–1928 | 109 | 15 | 11 | 26 | 151 | 10 | 1 | 0 | 1 | 8 | HOF 1958 |
| Clifton, Connor | United States | D | 2018–2023 | 232 | 10 | 33 | 43 | 157 | 46 | 4 | 6 | 10 | 34 | |
| Coffey, Paul† | Canada | D | 2000–2001 | 18 | 0 | 4 | 4 | 30 | – | – | – | – | – | HOF 2004 |
| Conacher, Roy† | Canada | LW | 1938–1946 | 166 | 94 | 52 | 146 | 40 | 37 | 11 | 12 | 23 | 16 | HOF 1998, SC 1939, SC 1941 |
| Connelly, Wayne | Canada | C | 1961–1967 | 169 | 25 | 38 | 63 | 58 | – | – | – | – | – | |
| Connolly, Brett | Canada | RW | 2014–2016 | 76 | 9 | 18 | 27 | 30 | – | – | – | – | – | |
| Connor, Harry | Canada | LW | 1927–1930 | 55 | 9 | 1 | 10 | 40 | 8 | 0 | 0 | 0 | 0 | |
| Cook, Bud | Canada | C | 1931–1932 | 28 | 4 | 4 | 8 | 14 | – | – | – | – | – | |
| Cook, Bun† | Canada | C | 1936–1937 | 44 | 4 | 5 | 9 | 8 | – | – | – | – | – | HOF 1995 |
| Cook, Lloyd | Canada | D | 1924–1925 | 4 | 1 | 0 | 1 | 0 | – | – | – | – | – | |
| Cooper, Carson | Canada | RW | 1924–1927 | 66 | 40 | 14 | 54 | 30 | – | – | – | – | – | |
| Corazzini, Carl | United States | C | 2003–2004 | 12 | 2 | 0 | 2 | 0 | – | – | – | – | – | |
| Corcoran, Norm | Canada | C/RW | 1949–1955 | 4 | 0 | 0 | 0 | 2 | 4 | 0 | 0 | 0 | 6 | |
| Cornforth, Mark | Canada | D | 1995–1996 | 6 | 0 | 0 | 0 | 4 | – | – | – | – | – | |
| Corvo, Joe | United States | D | 2011–2012 | 75 | 4 | 21 | 25 | 13 | 5 | 0 | 0 | 0 | 0 | |
| Costello, Murray† | Canada | C | 1954–1956 | 95 | 10 | 17 | 27 | 44 | 1 | 0 | 0 | 0 | 2 | HOF 2005 |
| Cote, Alain | Canada | D | 1985–1989 | 68 | 2 | 9 | 11 | 65 | – | – | – | – | – | |
| Courtnall, Geoff | Canada | LW | 1983–1988 | 259 | 78 | 81 | 159 | 368 | 9 | 0 | 2 | 2 | 9 | |
| Coutu, Billy | Canada | D | 1926–1927 | 42 | 1 | 1 | 2 | 39 | 7 | 1 | 0 | 1 | 4 | |
| Cowley, Bill† | Canada | C | 1935–1947 | 508 | 190 | 347 | 537 | 133 | 64 | 12 | 34 | 46 | 22 | HOF 1968, SC 1939, SC 1941 |
| Coyle, Charlie | United States | C | 2018–2025 | 452 | 96 | 134 | 230 | 163 | 75 | 18 | 19 | 37 | 38 | |
| Crawford, Jack† | Canada | D | 1937–1950 | 547 | 38 | 140 | 178 | 202 | 66 | 3 | 13 | 16 | 40 | SC 1939, SC 1941 |
| Crawford, Lou | Canada | LW | 1989–1992 | 26 | 2 | 1 | 3 | 29 | 1 | 0 | 0 | 0 | 0 | |
| Creighton, Dave | Canada | C | 1948–1954 | 295 | 72 | 65 | 137 | 76 | 30 | 6 | 7 | 13 | 12 | |
| Crisp, Terry | Canada | C | 1965–1966 | 3 | 0 | 0 | 0 | 0 | – | – | – | – | – | |
| Cross, Tommy | United States | D | 2015–2016 | 3 | 0 | 1 | 1 | 0 | 1 | 0 | 1 | 1 | 0 | |
| Crowder, Bruce | Canada | RW | 1981–1984 | 217 | 43 | 44 | 87 | 133 | 31 | 8 | 4 | 12 | 41 | |
| Crowder, Keith | Canada | RW | 1980–1989 | 607 | 219 | 258 | 477 | 1261 | 78 | 13 | 22 | 35 | 209 | |
| Cunningham, Craig | Canada | RW | 2013–2015 | 34 | 2 | 1 | 3 | 2 | – | – | – | – | – | |
| Cupolo, Bill | Canada | RW | 1944–1945 | 49 | 11 | 14 | 25 | 10 | 7 | 1 | 2 | 3 | 0 | |
| Curran, Brian | Canada | D | 1983–1986 | 115 | 3 | 7 | 10 | 407 | 5 | 0 | 0 | 0 | 11 | |
| Czarnik, Austin | United States | C | 2016–2018 | 59 | 5 | 12 | 17 | 12 | – | – | – | – | – | |
| Czerkawski, Mariusz | Poland | RW | 1993–1996; 2005–2006 | 100 | 23 | 22 | 45 | 45 | 18 | 4 | 3 | 7 | 4 | |
| Dallman, Kevin | Canada | D | 2005–2006 | 21 | 0 | 1 | 1 | 8 | – | – | – | – | – | |
| Darragh, Harold | Canada | LW | 1930–1931 | 24 | 2 | 4 | 6 | 6 | 5 | 0 | 0 | 0 | 2 | |
| Daugavins, Kaspars | Latvia | LW | 2012–2013 | 6 | 0 | 1 | 1 | 0 | 6 | 0 | 0 | 0 | 2 | |
| Davie, Bob | Canada | D | 1933–1936 | 41 | 0 | 1 | 1 | 25 | 4 | 0 | 0 | 0 | 0 | |
| Davis, Lorne | Canada | RW | 1955–1960 | 25 | 1 | 2 | 3 | 10 | – | – | – | – | – | |
| Davison, Murray | Canada | D | 1965–1966 | 1 | 0 | 0 | 0 | 0 | – | – | – | – | – | |
| DeBrusk, Jake | Canada | LW | 2017–2024 | 465 | 138 | 128 | 266 | 101 | 86 | 27 | 20 | 47 | 36 | |
| Delmonte, Armand | Canada | RW | 1945–1946 | 1 | 0 | 0 | 0 | 0 | – | – | – | – | – | |
| DeMarco, Ab | Canada | C | 1942–1944 | 4 | 4 | 2 | 6 | 0 | 9 | 3 | 0 | 3 | 2 | |
| DeMarco Jr., Ab | United States | D | 1978–1979 | 3 | 0 | 0 | 0 | 0 | – | – | – | – | – | |
| Dempsey, Nathan | Canada | D | 2006–2007 | 17 | 0 | 1 | 1 | 6 | – | – | – | – | – | |
| Denneny, Cy† | Canada | LW | 1928–1929 | 23 | 1 | 2 | 3 | 2 | 2 | 0 | 0 | 0 | 0 | HOF 1959, SC 1929 |
| Derlago, Bill | Canada | C | 1985–1986 | 39 | 5 | 16 | 21 | 15 | – | – | – | – | – | |
| Dillabough, Bob | Canada | C | 1965–1967 | 113 | 13 | 25 | 38 | 32 | – | – | – | – | – | |
| DiMaio, Rob | Canada | RW | 1996–2000 | 272 | 35 | 62 | 97 | 301 | 18 | 3 | 0 | 3 | 16 | |
| Doak, Gary† | Canada | D | 1965–1981 | 610 | 20 | 81 | 101 | 656 | 66 | 2 | 4 | 6 | 75 | SC 1970 |
| Dobbin, Brian | Canada | RW | 1991–1992 | 7 | 1 | 0 | 1 | 22 | – | – | – | – | – | |
| Donatelli, Clark | United States | LW | 1991–1992 | 10 | 0 | 1 | 1 | 22 | 2 | 0 | 0 | 0 | 0 | |
| Donato, Ryan | United States | C | 2017–2019 | 46 | 11 | 7 | 18 | 4 | 3 | 0 | 0 | 0 | 0 | |
| Donato, Ted | United States | LW | 1991–2004 | 528 | 119 | 147 | 266 | 297 | 49 | 8 | 9 | 17 | 22 | |
| Donnelly, Dave | Canada | C | 1983–1986 | 62 | 9 | 12 | 21 | 65 | 4 | 0 | 0 | 0 | 0 | |
| Donovan, Shean | Canada | RW | 2006–2007 | 76 | 6 | 11 | 17 | 56 | – | – | – | – | – | |
| Dornhoefer, Gary | Canada | RW | 1963–1966 | 62 | 12 | 12 | 24 | 35 | – | – | – | – | – | |
| Doull, Doug | Canada | LW | 2003–2004 | 35 | 0 | 1 | 1 | 132 | – | – | – | – | – | |
| Douris, Peter | Canada | RW | 1989–1993 | 148 | 24 | 25 | 49 | 38 | 26 | 3 | 5 | 8 | 11 | |
| Downey, Aaron | Canada | C | 1999–2000 | 1 | 0 | 0 | 0 | 0 | – | – | – | – | – | |
| Drouin, P. C. | Canada | LW | 1996–1997 | 3 | 0 | 0 | 0 | 0 | – | – | – | – | – | |
| Dufour, Luc | Canada | LW | 1982–1984 | 114 | 20 | 15 | 35 | 154 | 17 | 1 | 0 | 1 | 30 | |
| Duguid, Lorne | Canada | LW | 1935–1937 | 31 | 2 | 4 | 6 | 4 | 2 | 1 | 0 | 1 | 2 | |
| Dumart, Woody† | Canada | LW | 1935–1954 | 774 | 211 | 219 | 430 | 99 | 88 | 12 | 15 | 27 | 23 | HOF 1992, SC 1939, SC 1941 |
| Dunbar, Dale | United States | D | 1988–1989 | 1 | 0 | 0 | 0 | 0 | – | – | – | – | – | |
| Duran, Riley | United States | C | 2024–2025 | 2 | 0 | 0 | 0 | 2 | – | – | – | – | – | |
| Edestrand, Darryl | Canada | D | 1973–1978 | 215 | 8 | 37 | 45 | 195 | 34 | 2 | 6 | 8 | 47 | |
| Egan, Pat | Canada | D | 1943–1949 | 294 | 47 | 85 | 132 | 415 | 32 | 6 | 3 | 9 | 38 | |
| Ehman, Gerry | Canada | RW | 1957–1958 | 1 | 1 | 0 | 1 | 0 | – | – | – | – | – | |
| Elik, Todd | Canada | C | 1995–1997 | 90 | 17 | 45 | 62 | 56 | 4 | 0 | 2 | 2 | 16 | |
| Ellett, Dave | United States | D | 1997–1999 | 136 | 3 | 26 | 29 | 92 | 14 | 0 | 1 | 1 | 10 | |
| Eloranta, Mikko | Finland | LW | 1999–2002 | 118 | 18 | 23 | 41 | 76 | – | – | – | – | – | |
| Emma, David | United States | C | 1996–1997 | 5 | 0 | 0 | 0 | 0 | – | – | – | – | – | |
| Emmons, John | United States | C | 2001–2002 | 22 | 0 | 2 | 2 | 16 | – | – | – | – | – | |
| Emms, Hap | Canada | LW/D | 1934–1935 | 10 | 1 | 1 | 2 | 8 | – | – | – | – | – | |
| Erickson, Autry | Canada | D | 1959–1961 | 126 | 3 | 12 | 15 | 92 | – | – | – | – | – | |
| Erickson, Grant | Canada | LW | 1968–1969 | 2 | 1 | 0 | 1 | 0 | – | – | – | – | – | |
| Eriksson, Loui | Sweden | LW | 2013–2016 | 224 | 62 | 85 | 147 | 32 | 12 | 2 | 3 | 5 | 4 | |
| Esposito, Phil† | Canada | C | 1967–1976 | 625 | 459 | 553 | 1012 | 512 | 71 | 46 | 56 | 102 | 81 | HOF 1984, SC 1970, SC 1972 |
| Eyssimont, Michael* | United States | C | 2025–2026 | 56 | 8 | 10 | 18 | 31 | 2 | 0 | 0 | 0 | 0 | |
| Ezinicki, Bill | Canada | RW | 1950–1952 | 81 | 21 | 24 | 45 | 164 | 6 | 1 | 1 | 2 | 18 | |
| Farinacci, John | United States | C | 2024–2025 | 1 | 1 | 0 | 1 | 0 | – | – | – | – | – | |
| Featherstone, Glen | Canada | D | 1991–1994 | 99 | 7 | 13 | 20 | 274 | 1 | 0 | 0 | 0 | 0 | |
| Ference, Andrew† | Canada | D | 2006–2013 | 373 | 16 | 78 | 94 | 278 | 69 | 5 | 16 | 21 | 69 | SC 2011 |
| Fergus, Tom | United States | C | 1981–1985 | 289 | 98 | 138 | 236 | 138 | 29 | 7 | 2 | 9 | 28 | |
| Ferguson, Lorne | Canada | LW | 1949–1956 | 204 | 47 | 41 | 88 | 87 | 10 | 2 | 0 | 2 | 4 | |
| Ferlin, Brian | United States | RW | 2014–2015 | 7 | 0 | 1 | 1 | 0 | – | – | – | – | – | |
| Ferraro, Landon | Canada | C | 2015–2016 | 58 | 5 | 5 | 10 | 20 | – | – | – | – | – | |
| Ferraro, Peter | United States | LW | 1998–2000 | 51 | 6 | 9 | 15 | 44 | – | – | – | – | – | |
| Fielder, Guyle | United States | C | 1953–1954 | – | – | – | – | – | 2 | 0 | 0 | 0 | 0 | |
| Fillion, Marcel | Canada | LW | 1944–1945 | 1 | 0 | 0 | 0 | 0 | – | – | – | – | – | |
| Filmore, Tommy | Canada | RW | 1932–1934 | 5 | 0 | 0 | 0 | 0 | – | – | – | – | – | |
| Finnigan, Eddie | Canada | LW | 1935–1936 | 3 | 0 | 0 | 0 | 0 | – | – | – | – | – | |
| Fisher, Dunc | Canada | RW | 1950–1953 | 125 | 24 | 33 | 57 | 22 | 8 | 1 | 0 | 1 | 0 | |
| Fitzgerald, Tom | United States | RW | 2005–2006 | 71 | 4 | 6 | 10 | 40 | – | – | – | – | – | |
| Flaman, Fern† | Canada | D | 1944–1951; 1954–1961 | 683 | 30 | 147 | 177 | 1004 | 48 | 3 | 6 | 9 | 67 | HOF 1990 |
| Fleming, Reg | Canada | D/LW | 1964–1966 | 101 | 22 | 29 | 51 | 182 | – | – | – | – | – | |
| Flockhart, Ron | Canada | C | 1988–1989 | 4 | 0 | 0 | 0 | 0 | – | – | – | – | – | |
| Florek, Justin | United States | LW | 2013–2014 | 4 | 1 | 1 | 2 | 0 | – | – | – | – | – | |
| Fogarty, Steven | United States | C | 2021–2022 | 2 | 0 | 0 | 0 | 2 | – | – | – | – | – | |
| Foligno, Nick | United States | C | 2021–2023 | 124 | 12 | 27 | 39 | 106 | 13 | 1 | 3 | 4 | 22 | |
| Forbes, Dave | Canada | LW | 1973–1977 | 283 | 53 | 52 | 105 | 220 | 45 | 1 | 4 | 5 | 13 | |
| Forbes, Mike | Canada | D | 1977–1978 | 32 | 0 | 4 | 4 | 15 | – | – | – | – | – | |
| Forbort, Derek | United States | D | 2021–2024 | 165 | 9 | 21 | 30 | 88 | 17 | 1 | 1 | 2 | 33 | |
| Forsbacka Karlsson, Jakob | Sweden | C | 2016–2019 | 29 | 3 | 6 | 9 | 2 | – | – | – | – | – | |
| Foster, Dwight | Canada | RW | 1977–1981; 1985–1987 | 252 | 51 | 82 | 133 | 165 | 29 | 5 | 11 | 16 | 4 | |
| Foster, Yip | Canada | D | 1931–1932 | 32 | 1 | 2 | 3 | 12 | – | – | – | – | – | |
| Fraser, Matt | Canada | LW | 2013–2015 | 38 | 5 | 0 | 5 | 17 | 4 | 1 | 1 | 2 | 0 | |
| Frederic, Trent | United States | C | 2018–2025 | 337 | 55 | 54 | 109 | 307 | 22 | 3 | 2 | 5 | 46 | |
| Fredrickson, Frank† | Canada | C | 1926–1929 | 80 | 27 | 12 | 39 | 141 | 10 | 2 | 3 | 5 | 24 | HOF 1958 |
| Froden, Jesper | Sweden | F | 2021–2022 | 7 | 1 | 0 | 1 | 2 | – | – | – | – | – | |
| Frost, Harry† | Canada | RW | 1938–1939 | 2 | 0 | 0 | 0 | 0 | 1 | 0 | 0 | 0 | 0 | SC 1939 |
| Gagne, Art | Canada | RW | 1929–1930 | 9 | 0 | 2 | 2 | 8 | – | – | – | – | – | |
| Gagne, Pierre | Canada | LW | 1959–1960 | 2 | 0 | 0 | 0 | 0 | – | – | – | – | – | |
| Gagne, Simon | Canada | LW | 2014–2015 | 23 | 3 | 1 | 4 | 4 | – | – | – | – | – | |
| Gagnon, Johnny | Canada | RW | 1934–1935 | 23 | 1 | 2 | 3 | 9 | – | – | – | – | – | |
| Gainor, Dutch† | Canada | C | 1927–1931 | 164 | 48 | 43 | 91 | 118 | 15 | 2 | 1 | 3 | 12 | SC 1929 |
| Galbraith, Percy† | Canada | LW/D | 1926–1934 | 346 | 31 | 29 | 60 | 238 | 31 | 4 | 7 | 11 | 22 | SC 1929 |
| Galley, Garry | Canada | D | 1988–1992 | 257 | 24 | 82 | 106 | 322 | 46 | 4 | 9 | 13 | 84 | |
| Gallinger, Don | Canada | C | 1942–1948 | 222 | 65 | 88 | 153 | 89 | 23 | 5 | 5 | 10 | 19 | |
| Gardner, Cal | Canada | C | 1953–1957 | 280 | 57 | 83 | 140 | 225 | 19 | 3 | 2 | 5 | 6 | |
| Gariepy, Ray | Canada | D | 1953–1954 | 35 | 1 | 6 | 7 | 39 | – | – | – | – | – | |
| Gaudreault, Armand | Canada | LW | 1944–1945 | 45 | 15 | 9 | 24 | 27 | 7 | 0 | 2 | 2 | 8 | |
| Gaunce, Brendan | Canada | C | 2019–2020 | 1 | 0 | 1 | 1 | 2 | – | – | – | – | – | |
| Gauthier, Jean | Canada | D | 1968–1969 | 11 | 0 | 2 | 2 | 8 | – | – | – | – | – | |
| Geekie, Morgan* | Canada | C | 2023–2026 | 234 | 89 | 75 | 164 | 72 | 19 | 6 | 3 | 9 | 12 | |
| Gendron, Jean-Guy | Canada | LW | 1958–1964 | 270 | 66 | 62 | 128 | 228 | 7 | 1 | 0 | 1 | 18 | |
| Geran, Gerry | United States | C | 1925–1926 | 33 | 5 | 1 | 6 | 6 | – | – | – | – | – | |
| Getliffe, Ray† | Canada | C/LW | 1935–1939 | 128 | 37 | 40 | 77 | 57 | 19 | 3 | 3 | 6 | 6 | SC 1939 |
| Gibbs, Barry | Canada | D | 1975–1976 | 24 | 0 | 0 | 0 | 4 | – | – | – | – | – | |
| Gibson, Doug | Canada | C | 1973–1976 | 52 | 7 | 18 | 25 | 0 | 1 | 0 | 0 | 0 | 0 | |
| Gilbert, Jeannot | Canada | C | 1962–1965 | 9 | 0 | 1 | 1 | 4 | – | – | – | – | – | |
| Gill, Hal | United States | D | 1997–2006 | 626 | 20 | 77 | 97 | 588 | 36 | 0 | 2 | 2 | 28 | |
| Gillis, Mike | Canada | LW | 1980–1984 | 125 | 17 | 24 | 41 | 104 | 27 | 2 | 5 | 7 | 10 | |
| Gionta, Brian | United States | RW | 2017–2018 | 20 | 2 | 5 | 7 | 2 | 1 | 0 | 0 | 0 | 0 | |
| Girard, Jonathan | Canada | D | 1998–2003 | 150 | 10 | 34 | 44 | 46 | 3 | 0 | 1 | 1 | 2 | |
| Giroux, Art | Canada | RW | 1934–1935 | 10 | 1 | 0 | 1 | 0 | – | – | – | – | – | |
| Gladu, Jean-Paul | Canada | LW | 1944–1945 | 40 | 6 | 14 | 20 | 2 | 7 | 2 | 2 | 4 | 0 | |
| Glennon, Matt | United States | LW | 1991–1992 | 3 | 0 | 0 | 0 | 2 | – | – | – | – | – | |
| Godfrey, Warren | Canada | D | 1952–1959; 1962–1963 | 261 | 9 | 48 | 57 | 227 | 18 | 0 | 1 | 1 | 6 | |
| Goldsworthy, Bill | Canada | RW | 1964–1967 | 33 | 6 | 6 | 12 | 30 | – | – | – | – | – | |
| Goldsworthy, Leroy | United States | RW | 1936–1938 | 93 | 17 | 16 | 33 | 22 | 6 | 0 | 0 | 0 | 2 | |
| Gonchar, Sergei | Russia | D | 2003–2004 | 15 | 4 | 5 | 9 | 12 | 7 | 1 | 4 | 5 | 4 | |
| Gordon, Fred | Canada | RW | 1927–1928 | 43 | 3 | 2 | 5 | 42 | 2 | 0 | 0 | 0 | 0 | |
| Goren, Lee | Canada | RW | 2000–2003 | 35 | 4 | 1 | 5 | 14 | 5 | 0 | 0 | 0 | 5 | |
| Goring, Butch | Canada | C | 1984–1985 | 39 | 13 | 21 | 34 | 6 | 5 | 1 | 1 | 2 | 0 | |
| Gould, Bobby | Canada | RW | 1989–1990 | 77 | 8 | 17 | 25 | 92 | 17 | 0 | 0 | 0 | 4 | |
| Gracie, Bob | Canada | C/LW | 1933–1934 | 23 | 2 | 6 | 8 | 14 | – | – | – | – | – | |
| Gradin, Thomas | Sweden | C | 1986–1987 | 64 | 12 | 31 | 43 | 18 | 4 | 0 | 4 | 4 | 0 | |
| Graham, Rod | Canada | LW | 1974–1975 | 14 | 2 | 1 | 3 | 7 | – | – | – | – | – | |
| Graham, Ted | Canada | D | 1935–1937 | 49 | 4 | 1 | 5 | 37 | 2 | 0 | 0 | 0 | 0 | |
| Gray, Terry | Canada | RW | 1961–1962 | 42 | 8 | 7 | 15 | 15 | – | – | – | – | – | |
| Green, Red† | Canada | LW | 1928–1929 | 22 | 0 | 0 | 0 | 14 | 1 | 0 | 0 | 0 | 0 | SC 1929 |
| Green, Ted† | Canada | D | 1961–1972 | 621 | 48 | 206 | 254 | 1029 | 31 | 4 | 8 | 12 | 54 | SC 1972 |
| Green, Travis | Canada | C | 2003–2006 | 146 | 21 | 17 | 38 | 146 | 7 | 0 | 1 | 1 | 8 | |
| Greer, A. J. | Canada | LW | 2022–2023 | 61 | 5 | 7 | 12 | 114 | – | – | – | – | – | |
| Griffith, Seth | Canada | C | 2014–2016 | 34 | 6 | 5 | 11 | 10 | – | – | – | – | – | |
| Gronsdahl, Lloyd | Canada | RW | 1941–1942 | 10 | 1 | 2 | 3 | 0 | – | – | – | – | – | |
| Grosek, Michal | Czech Republic | RW | 2002–2004 | 96 | 5 | 20 | 25 | 104 | 5 | 0 | 0 | 0 | 13 | |
| Gross, Lloyd | Canada | LW | 1933–1934 | 6 | 1 | 0 | 1 | 6 | – | – | – | – | – | |
| Grosso, Don | Canada | LW/C | 1946–1947 | 33 | 0 | 2 | 2 | 2 | – | – | – | – | – | |
| Gruden, John | United States | D | 1993–1996 | 59 | 0 | 7 | 7 | 28 | 3 | 0 | 1 | 1 | 0 | |
| Gryp, Bob | Canada | LW | 1973–1974 | 1 | 0 | 0 | 0 | 0 | – | – | – | – | – | |
| Grzelcyk, Matt | United States | D | 2016–2024 | 445 | 25 | 110 | 135 | 237 | 66 | 5 | 9 | 14 | 26 | |
| Guay, Paul | United States | RW | 1988–1989 | 5 | 0 | 2 | 2 | 0 | – | – | – | – | – | |
| Guerin, Bill | United States | RW | 2000–2002 | 142 | 69 | 60 | 129 | 213 | 6 | 4 | 2 | 6 | 6 | |
| Guidolin, Bep | Canada | LW | 1942–1947 | 195 | 49 | 70 | 119 | 246 | 22 | 5 | 7 | 12 | 31 | |
| Guite, Ben | Canada | RW | 2005–2006 | 1 | 0 | 0 | 0 | 0 | – | – | – | – | – | |
| Hagens, James* | United States | C | 2025–2026 | 2 | 0 | 1 | 1 | 2 | 3 | 0 | 0 | 0 | 2 | |
| Hagman, Matti | Finland | C | 1976–1978 | 90 | 15 | 18 | 33 | 2 | 8 | 0 | 1 | 1 | 0 | |
| Hall, Taylor | Canada | LW | 1987–1988 | 7 | 0 | 0 | 0 | 4 | – | – | – | – | – | |
| Hall, Taylor | Canada | LW | 2020–2023 | 158 | 44 | 67 | 111 | 68 | 25 | 10 | 7 | 17 | 19 | |
| Halward, Doug | Canada | D | 1975–1978 | 65 | 3 | 9 | 12 | 14 | 7 | 0 | 0 | 0 | 4 | |
| Hamill, Red† | Canada | LW | 1937–1942 | 59 | 16 | 14 | 30 | 20 | 16 | 0 | 1 | 1 | 13 | SC 1939 |
| Hamill, Zach | Canada | C | 2009–2012 | 20 | 0 | 4 | 4 | 4 | – | – | – | – | – | |
| Hamilton, Dougie | Canada | D | 2012–2015 | 178 | 22 | 61 | 83 | 95 | 19 | 2 | 8 | 10 | 14 | |
| Hammond, Ken | Canada | D | 1990–1991 | 1 | 1 | 0 | 1 | 2 | 8 | 0 | 0 | 0 | 10 | |
| Harkins, Brett | United States | LW | 1994–1997 | 45 | 4 | 15 | 19 | 8 | – | – | – | – | – | |
| Harnott, Walter | Canada | LW | 1933–1934 | 6 | 0 | 0 | 0 | 2 | – | – | – | – | – | |
| Harrington, Hago | United States | LW | 1925–1928 | 48 | 8 | 4 | 12 | 19 | 2 | 0 | 0 | 0 | 0 | |
| Harris, Jordan* | United States | D | 2025–2026 | 8 | 1 | 2 | 3 | 0 | 1 | 0 | 0 | 0 | 0 | |
| Harris, Fred | Canada | LW | 1924–1925 | 6 | 3 | 1 | 4 | 8 | – | – | – | – | – | |
| Harris, Henry | Canada | RW | 1930–1931 | 32 | 2 | 4 | 6 | 20 | – | – | – | – | – | |
| Harrison, Ed | Canada | C/LW | 1947–1951 | 189 | 26 | 24 | 50 | 51 | 9 | 1 | 0 | 1 | 2 | |
| Harrison, Jim | Canada | C | 1968–1970 | 39 | 4 | 3 | 7 | 37 | – | – | – | – | – | |
| Hathaway, Garnet | United States | RW | 2022–2023 | 25 | 4 | 2 | 6 | 17 | 7 | 0 | 1 | 1 | 10 | |
| Haula, Erik | Finland | LW | 2021–2022 | 78 | 18 | 26 | 44 | 47 | 7 | 1 | 2 | 3 | 8 | |
| Hawgood, Greg | Canada | D | 1987–1990 | 134 | 27 | 51 | 78 | 160 | 28 | 2 | 5 | 7 | 14 | |
| Hayes, Jimmy | United States | RW | 2015–2017 | 133 | 15 | 19 | 34 | 89 | – | – | – | – | – | |
| Haynes, Paul | Canada | C | 1934–1935 | 30 | 4 | 3 | 7 | 8 | 3 | 0 | 0 | 0 | 0 | |
| Headley, Fern | United States | D | 1924–1925 | 13 | 1 | 3 | 4 | 4 | – | – | – | – | – | |
| Healey, Eric | United States | LW | 2005–2006 | 2 | 0 | 0 | 0 | 2 | – | – | – | – | – | |
| Hebenton, Andy | Canada | RW | 1963–1964 | 70 | 12 | 11 | 23 | 8 | – | – | – | – | – | |
| Heinen, Danton | Canada | C/LW | 2016–2020; 2023–2024 | 294 | 51 | 88 | 139 | 70 | 41 | 3 | 7 | 10 | 4 | |
| Heinrich, Lionel | Canada | LW | 1955–1956 | 35 | 1 | 1 | 2 | 33 | – | – | – | – | – | |
| Heinze, Steve | United States | RW | 1991–2000 | 515 | 131 | 108 | 239 | 275 | 52 | 8 | 11 | 19 | 36 | |
| Henderson, Jay | Canada | LW | 1998–2001 | 33 | 1 | 3 | 4 | 37 | – | – | – | – | – | |
| Henderson, Murray | Canada | D | 1944–1952 | 405 | 24 | 62 | 86 | 305 | 41 | 2 | 3 | 5 | 23 | |
| Hennessy, Josh | United States | C | 2011–2012 | 3 | 0 | 0 | 0 | 2 | – | – | – | – | – | |
| Herbert, Jimmy | Canada | C/RW | 1924–1928 | 112 | 63 | 25 | 88 | 179 | 8 | 3 | 0 | 3 | 13 | |
| Hergesheimer, Phil | Canada | RW | 1941–1942 | 3 | 0 | 0 | 0 | 12 | – | – | – | – | – | |
| Herr, Matt | United States | C | 2002–2003 | 3 | 0 | 0 | 0 | 0 | – | – | – | – | – | |
| Hervey, Matt | United States | D | 1991–1992 | 16 | 0 | 1 | 1 | 55 | 5 | 0 | 0 | 0 | 6 | |
| Heximer, Obs | Canada | LW/C | 1932–1933 | 48 | 7 | 5 | 12 | 12 | 5 | 0 | 0 | 0 | 2 | |
| Hicks, Wayne | United States | RW | 1962–1963 | 65 | 7 | 9 | 16 | 12 | – | – | – | – | – | |
| Hilbert, Andy | United States | C/LW | 2001–2004 | 38 | 3 | 3 | 6 | 18 | 5 | 1 | 0 | 1 | 0 | |
| Hill, Mel† | Canada | RW | 1937–1941 | 131 | 26 | 24 | 50 | 41 | 25 | 7 | 4 | 11 | 19 | SC 1939, SC 1941 |
| Hiller, Wilbert | Canada | LW | 1941–1943 | 44 | 7 | 10 | 17 | 19 | 5 | 0 | 1 | 1 | 0 | |
| Hillier, Randy | Canada | D | 1981–1984 | 164 | 3 | 30 | 33 | 253 | 11 | 0 | 1 | 1 | 20 | |
| Hillman, Floyd | Canada | D | 1956–1957 | 6 | 0 | 0 | 0 | 10 | – | – | – | – | – | |
| Hillman, Larry | Canada | D | 1957–1960 | 127 | 6 | 30 | 36 | 73 | 18 | 0 | 3 | 3 | 6 | |
| Hitchman, Lionel† | Canada | D | 1924–1934 | 378 | 25 | 27 | 52 | 511 | 31 | 2 | 1 | 3 | 64 | SC 1929 |
| Hnidy, Shane† | Canada | D | 2007–2011 | 111 | 4 | 13 | 17 | 88 | 17 | 2 | 1 | 3 | 16 | SC 2011 |
| Hodge, Ken† | Canada | RW | 1967–1976 | 652 | 289 | 385 | 674 | 620 | 86 | 34 | 47 | 81 | 118 | SC 1970, SC 1972 |
| Hodge, Jr., Ken | Canada | C/RW | 1990–1992 | 112 | 36 | 40 | 76 | 30 | 15 | 4 | 6 | 10 | 6 | |
| Hodgson, Ted | Canada | RW | 1966–1967 | 4 | 0 | 0 | 0 | 0 | – | – | – | – | – | |
| Hoggan, Jeff | Canada | RW | 2006–2008 | 47 | 0 | 2 | 2 | 33 | – | – | – | – | – | |
| Hogue, Benoit | Canada | C | 2001–2002 | 17 | 4 | 4 | 8 | 9 | – | – | – | – | – | |
| Holden, Nick | Canada | D | 2017–2018 | 18 | 1 | 4 | 5 | 0 | 2 | 0 | 1 | 1 | 0 | |
| Hollett, Flash† | Canada | D | 1935–1944 | 353 | 84 | 115 | 199 | 198 | 48 | 5 | 20 | 25 | 20 | SC 1939, SC 1941 |
| Hoover, Ron | Canada | C | 1989–1991 | 17 | 4 | 0 | 4 | 31 | 8 | 0 | 0 | 0 | 18 | |
| Horeck, Pete | Canada | LW | 1949–1951 | 100 | 15 | 18 | 33 | 79 | 4 | 0 | 0 | 0 | 13 | |
| Horton, Nathan† | Canada | RW | 2010–2013 | 169 | 56 | 51 | 107 | 161 | 43 | 15 | 21 | 36 | 49 | SC 2011 |
| Horvath, Bronco | Canada | C | 1957–1961 | 227 | 103 | 112 | 215 | 204 | 19 | 7 | 6 | 13 | 8 | |
| Howe, Marty | United States | D | 1982–1983 | 78 | 1 | 11 | 12 | 24 | 12 | 0 | 1 | 1 | 9 | |
| Huard, Bill | Canada | LW | 1992–1993 | 2 | 0 | 0 | 0 | 0 | – | – | – | – | – | |
| Hughes, Brent | Canada | LW | 1991–1995 | 191 | 25 | 22 | 47 | 511 | 29 | 4 | 1 | 5 | 53 | |
| Hughes, Cameron | Canada | C | 2019–2021 | 2 | 0 | 0 | 0 | 0 | – | – | – | – | – | |
| Hughes, Ryan | Canada | C | 1995–1996 | 3 | 0 | 0 | 0 | 0 | – | – | – | – | – | |
| Hulbig, Joe | United States | LW | 1999–2001 | 31 | 2 | 2 | 4 | 12 | – | – | – | – | – | |
| Huml, Ivan | Czech Republic | C | 2001–2004 | 49 | 6 | 12 | 18 | 36 | – | – | – | – | – | |
| Hunwick, Matt | United States | D | 2007–2011 | 164 | 13 | 32 | 45 | 76 | 14 | 0 | 6 | 6 | 2 | |
| Hurley, Paul | United States | D | 1968–1969 | 1 | 0 | 1 | 1 | 0 | – | – | – | – | – | |
| Huscroft, Jamie | Canada | D | 1993–1995 | 70 | 0 | 7 | 7 | 247 | 9 | 0 | 0 | 0 | 20 | |
| Hutton, Bill | Canada | D/RW | 1929–1931 | 29 | 2 | 0 | 2 | 4 | – | – | – | – | – | |
| Hynes, Dave | United States | LW | 1973–1975 | 22 | 4 | 0 | 4 | 2 | – | – | – | – | – | |
| Hynes, Gord | Canada | D | 1991–1992 | 15 | 0 | 5 | 5 | 6 | 12 | 1 | 2 | 3 | 6 | |
| Iafrate, Al | United States | D | 1993–1994 | 12 | 5 | 8 | 13 | 20 | 13 | 3 | 1 | 4 | 6 | |
| Iginla, Jarome | Canada | RW | 2013–2014 | 78 | 30 | 31 | 61 | 47 | 12 | 5 | 2 | 7 | 12 | |
| Ingram, Frank | Canada | RW | 1924–1925 | 1 | 0 | 0 | 0 | 0 | – | – | – | – | – | |
| Irvine, Ted | Canada | LW | 1963–1964 | 1 | 0 | 0 | 0 | 0 | – | – | – | – | – | |
| Irwin, Matt | Canada | D | 2015–2016 | 2 | 0 | 0 | 0 | 0 | – | – | – | – | – | |
| Isbister, Brad | Canada | LW | 2005–2006 | 58 | 6 | 17 | 23 | 46 | – | – | – | – | – | |
| Jackman, Richard | Canada | D | 2001–2002 | 2 | 0 | 0 | 0 | 2 | – | – | – | – | – | |
| Jackson, Art† | Canada | C | 1937–1945 | 308 | 94 | 134 | 228 | 103 | 33 | 8 | 9 | 17 | 23 | SC 1941 |
| Jackson, Busher† | Canada | LW | 1941–1944 | 112 | 35 | 43 | 78 | 81 | 14 | 1 | 3 | 4 | 10 | HOF 1971 |
| Jackson, Stan | Canada | LW | 1924–1926 | 52 | 8 | 7 | 15 | 72 | – | – | – | – | – | |
| Jackson, Walter | Canada | LW | 1935–1936 | 2 | 0 | 0 | 0 | 0 | – | – | – | – | – | |
| Jagr, Jaromir | Czech Republic | RW | 2012–2013 | 11 | 2 | 7 | 9 | 2 | 22 | 0 | 10 | 10 | 8 | |
| Janney, Craig | United States | C | 1987–1992 | 262 | 85 | 198 | 283 | 44 | 69 | 17 | 56 | 73 | 45 | |
| Jeannot, Tanner* | Canada | F | 2025–2026 | 77 | 6 | 16 | 22 | 66 | 6 | 1 | 0 | 1 | 6 | |
| Jenkins, Roger | United States | RW/D | 1935–1936 | 40 | 2 | 6 | 8 | 51 | 2 | 0 | 1 | 1 | 2 | |
| Jennings, Bill | Canada | RW | 1944–1945 | 39 | 20 | 14 | 34 | 25 | 7 | 2 | 2 | 4 | 6 | |
| Jeremiah, Eddie | United States | RW/D | 1931–1932 | 5 | 0 | 0 | 0 | 0 | – | – | – | – | – | |
| Jerwa, Frank | Canada | LW/D | 1931–1935 | 65 | 7 | 9 | 16 | 37 | – | – | – | – | – | |
| Jerwa, Joe | Canada | D | 1931–1934; 1936–1937 | 39 | 3 | 5 | 8 | 42 | – | – | – | – | – | |
| Jillson, Jeff | United States | D | 2003–2004 | 50 | 4 | 10 | 14 | 35 | – | – | – | – | – | |
| Johansson, Marcus | Sweden | F | 2018–2019 | 10 | 1 | 2 | 3 | 0 | 21 | 4 | 7 | 11 | 0 | |
| Johnson, Aaron | Canada | D | 2012–2013 | 10 | 0 | 0 | 0 | 10 | – | – | – | – | – | |
| Johnson, Nick | Canada | RW | 2013–2014 | 9 | 0 | 0 | 0 | 0 | – | – | – | – | – | |
| Johnson, Norm | Canada | C | 1957–1959 | 54 | 4 | 20 | 24 | 33 | 12 | 4 | 0 | 4 | 6 | |
| Johnson, Tom† | Canada | D | 1963–1965 | 121 | 4 | 30 | 34 | 63 | – | – | – | – | – | HOF 1970 |
| Johnson, Tyler | United States | C | 2024–2025 | 9 | 0 | 2 | 2 | 10 | – | – | – | – | – | |
| Johnston, Greg | Canada | RW | 1983–1990 | 183 | 26 | 28 | 54 | 119 | 22 | 2 | 1 | 3 | 12 | |
| Jokiharju, Henri* | Finland | D | 2024–2026 | 59 | 2 | 17 | 19 | 16 | 2 | 0 | 0 | 0 | 0 | |
| Jonathan, Stan | Canada | LW | 1975–1983 | 392 | 91 | 107 | 198 | 738 | 62 | 8 | 4 | 12 | 137 | |
| Jones, Max | United States | LW | 2024–2025 | 7 | 0 | 0 | 0 | 8 | – | – | – | – | – | |
| Jones, Ron | Canada | D | 1971–1973 | 8 | 0 | 0 | 0 | 2 | – | – | – | – | – | |
| Joyce, Bob | Canada | LW | 1987–1990 | 115 | 26 | 38 | 64 | 78 | 32 | 13 | 8 | 21 | 20 | |
| Juneau, Joe | Canada | C | 1991–1994 | 161 | 51 | 142 | 193 | 72 | 19 | 6 | 12 | 18 | 27 | |
| Jurcina, Milan | Slovakia | D | 2005–2007 | 91 | 8 | 6 | 14 | 74 | – | – | – | – | – | |
| Kaberle, Tomas† | Czech Republic | D | 2010–2011 | 24 | 1 | 8 | 9 | 2 | 25 | 0 | 11 | 11 | 4 | SC 2011 |
| Kalbfleisch, Walter | Canada | D | 1936–1937 | 1 | 0 | 0 | 0 | 0 | – | – | – | – | – | |
| Kalus, Petr | Czech Republic | RW | 2006–2007 | 9 | 4 | 1 | 5 | 6 | – | – | – | – | – | |
| Kaminsky, Max | Canada | C | 1934–1936 | 75 | 13 | 17 | 30 | 24 | 4 | 0 | 0 | 0 | 0 | |
| Kampfer, Steven | United States | D | 2010–2012; 2018–2021 | 113 | 10 | 15 | 25 | 44 | 3 | 1 | 0 | 1 | 0 | |
| Karsums, Martins | Latvia | RW | 2008–2009 | 6 | 0 | 1 | 1 | 0 | – | – | – | – | – | |
| Kasatonov, Alexei | Russia | D | 1994–1996 | 63 | 3 | 14 | 17 | 45 | 5 | 0 | 0 | 0 | 2 | |
| Kasper, Steve | Canada | C | 1980–1989 | 564 | 135 | 220 | 355 | 450 | 63 | 14 | 16 | 30 | 62 | |
| Kase, Ondrej | Czech Republic | RW | 2019–2021 | 9 | 0 | 1 | 1 | 4 | 11 | 0 | 4 | 4 | 2 | |
| Kastelic, Mark* | United States | C | 2024–2026 | 143 | 17 | 19 | 36 | 246 | 6 | 0 | 1 | 1 | 11 | |
| Keats, Duke† | Canada | C | 1926–1927 | 17 | 4 | 4 | 8 | 20 | – | – | – | – | – | HOF 1958 |
| Kekalainen, Jarmo | Finland | LW | 1989–1991 | 27 | 4 | 3 | 7 | 14 | – | – | – | – | – | |
| Kelleher, Chris | United States | D | 2001–2002 | 1 | 0 | 0 | 0 | 0 | – | – | – | – | – | |
| Kemppainen, Joonas | Finland | LW | 2015–2016 | 44 | 2 | 3 | 5 | 4 | – | – | – | – | – | |
| Kelly, Chris† | Canada | C/LW | 2010–2016 | 288 | 43 | 58 | 101 | 143 | 54 | 8 | 11 | 19 | 29 | SC 2011 |
| Kennedy, Forbes | Canada | C | 1962–1966 | 221 | 30 | 45 | 75 | 237 | – | – | – | – | – | |
| Kennedy, Sheldon | Canada | RW | 1996–1997 | 56 | 8 | 10 | 18 | 30 | – | – | – | – | – | |
| Kessel, Phil | United States | RW | 2006–2009 | 222 | 66 | 60 | 126 | 56 | 15 | 9 | 6 | 15 | 6 | |
| Khristich, Dmitri | Ukraine | RW | 1997–1999 | 161 | 58 | 79 | 137 | 90 | 18 | 5 | 6 | 11 | 8 | |
| Khokhlachev, Alexander | Russia | C | 2013–2016 | 9 | 0 | 0 | 0 | 2 | – | – | – | – | – | |
| Khusnutdinov, Marat* | Russia | C | 2024–2026 | 95 | 18 | 20 | 38 | 22 | 6 | 0 | 0 | 0 | 2 | |
| Kimble, Darin | Canada | RW | 1992–1993 | 55 | 7 | 3 | 10 | 177 | 4 | 0 | 0 | 0 | 0 | |
| Klein, Lloyd | Canada | LW | 1928–1932 | 13 | 2 | 0 | 2 | 5 | – | – | – | – | – | |
| Klukay, Joe | Canada | LW | 1952–1955 | 150 | 33 | 33 | 66 | 51 | 15 | 1 | 2 | 3 | 9 | |
| Kluzak, Gord | Canada | D | 1982–1991 | 299 | 25 | 98 | 123 | 541 | 46 | 6 | 13 | 19 | 129 | |
| Knibbs, Bill | Canada | C | 1964–1965 | 53 | 7 | 10 | 17 | 4 | – | – | – | – | – | |
| Knipscheer, Fred | United States | C | 1993–1995 | 27 | 6 | 3 | 9 | 16 | 16 | 2 | 1 | 3 | 6 | |
| Knuble, Mike | Canada | RW | 1999–2004 | 307 | 69 | 76 | 145 | 164 | 14 | 2 | 2 | 4 | 2 | |
| Kobasew, Chuck | Canada | RW | 2006–2010 | 158 | 44 | 40 | 84 | 112 | 11 | 3 | 3 | 6 | 14 | |
| Koepke, Cole | United States | LW | 2024–2025 | 73 | 10 | 7 | 17 | 17 | – | – | – | – | – | |
| Kolarik, Pavel | Czech Republic | D | 2000–2002 | 23 | 0 | 0 | 0 | 10 | – | – | – | – | – | |
| Kolyachonok, Vladislav* | Belarus | D | 2025–2026 | 2 | 0 | 0 | 0 | 0 | – | – | – | – | – | |
| Kopak, Russ | Canada | C | 1943–1944 | 24 | 7 | 9 | 16 | 0 | – | – | – | – | – | |
| Koppanen, Joona | Finland | LW | 2022–2023 | 5 | 0 | 1 | 1 | 4 | – | – | – | – | – | |
| Kostynski, Doug | Canada | C | 1983–1985 | 15 | 3 | 1 | 4 | 4 | – | – | – | – | – | |
| Kovalenko, Andrei | Russia | RW | 2000–2001 | 76 | 16 | 21 | 37 | 27 | – | – | – | – | – | |
| Kraftcheck, Stephen | Canada | D | 1950–1951 | 21 | 0 | 0 | 0 | 8 | 6 | 0 | 0 | 0 | 7 | |
| Krake, Skip | Canada | C | 1963–1968 | 87 | 11 | 9 | 20 | 17 | 4 | 0 | 0 | 0 | 2 | |
| Krejci, David† | Czech Republic | C | 2006–2023 | 1032 | 231 | 555 | 786 | 359 | 160 | 43 | 85 | 128 | 60 | SC 2011 |
| Krug, Torey | United States | D | 2011–2020 | 523 | 67 | 270 | 337 | 220 | 75 | 11 | 41 | 52 | 46 | |
| Krushelnyski, Mike | Canada | LW/C | 1981–1984 | 162 | 51 | 65 | 116 | 100 | 20 | 8 | 6 | 14 | 14 | |
| Kryzanowski, Ed | Canada | D | 1948–1952 | 232 | 15 | 22 | 37 | 65 | 18 | 0 | 1 | 1 | 4 | |
| Kuhlman, Karson | United States | C | 2018–2022 | 75 | 7 | 8 | 15 | 15 | 16 | 1 | 3 | 4 | 2 | |
| Kullman, Arnie | Canada | C | 1947–1950 | 13 | 0 | 1 | 1 | 11 | – | – | – | – | – | |
| Kultanen, Jarno | Finland | D | 2000–2003 | 102 | 2 | 11 | 13 | 59 | – | – | – | – | – | |
| Kuraly, Sean* | United States | C | 2016–2021; 2025–2026 | 352 | 30 | 60 | 90 | 175 | 63 | 10 | 11 | 21 | 26 | |
| Kurtenbach, Orland | Canada | C | 1961–1965 | 142 | 18 | 45 | 63 | 188 | – | – | – | – | – | |
| Kutlak, Zdenek | Czech Republic | D | 2000–2004 | 16 | 1 | 2 | 3 | 4 | – | – | – | – | – | |
| Kvartalnov, Dmitri | Russia | LW | 1992–1994 | 112 | 42 | 49 | 91 | 26 | 4 | 0 | 0 | 0 | 0 | |
| Kyle, Gus | Canada | D | 1951–1952 | 69 | 1 | 12 | 13 | 127 | 2 | 0 | 0 | 0 | 4 | |
| Laaksonen, Antti | Finland | LW | 1998–2000 | 38 | 7 | 5 | 12 | 4 | – | – | – | – | – | |
| Labine, Leo | Canada | RW | 1951–1961 | 571 | 123 | 180 | 303 | 670 | 49 | 9 | 9 | 18 | 98 | |
| Labrie, Guy | Canada | D | 1943–1944 | 15 | 2 | 7 | 9 | 2 | – | – | – | – | – | |
| LaCouture, Dan | United States | LW | 2005–2006 | 55 | 2 | 2 | 4 | 53 | – | – | – | – | – | |
| Lacroix, Daniel | Canada | LW | 1994–1995 | 23 | 1 | 0 | 1 | 38 | – | – | – | – | – | |
| Lalonde, Bobby | Canada | C | 1979–1981 | 133 | 14 | 37 | 51 | 59 | 7 | 2 | 2 | 4 | 4 | |
| Lamb, Joe | Canada | RW | 1932–1934 | 90 | 21 | 23 | 44 | 115 | 5 | 0 | 1 | 1 | 6 | |
| Lane, Myles† | United States | D | 1928–1934 | 47 | 3 | 1 | 4 | 21 | 11 | 0 | 0 | 0 | 0 | SC 1929 |
| Lang, Robert | Czech Republic | C | 1997–1998 | 3 | 0 | 0 | 0 | 2 | – | – | – | – | – | |
| Langdon, Steve | Canada | LW | 1974–1978 | 7 | 0 | 1 | 1 | 0 | 4 | 0 | 0 | 0 | 0 | |
| Langfeld, Josh | United States | RW | 2005–2006 | 18 | 0 | 1 | 1 | 10 | – | – | – | – | – | |
| Langlois, Albert | Canada | D | 1965–1966 | 65 | 4 | 10 | 14 | 54 | – | – | – | – | – | |
| Lapointe, Guy† | Canada | D | 1983–1984 | 45 | 2 | 16 | 18 | 34 | – | – | – | – | – | HOF 1993 |
| Lapointe, Martin | Canada | RW | 2001–2004 | 205 | 40 | 43 | 83 | 255 | 18 | 2 | 2 | 4 | 40 | |
| Larman, Drew | United States | C | 2009–2010 | 4 | 0 | 0 | 0 | 0 | – | – | – | – | – | |
| Larose, Bonner | Canada | LW | 1925–1926 | 6 | 0 | 0 | 0 | 0 | – | – | – | – | – | |
| Larson, Reed | United States | D | 1985–1988 | 141 | 25 | 52 | 77 | 196 | 15 | 1 | 3 | 4 | 14 | |
| Lashoff, Matt | United States | D | 2006–2009 | 46 | 1 | 7 | 8 | 22 | – | – | – | – | – | |
| Lauder, Martin | Canada | D/C | 1927–1928 | 3 | 0 | 0 | 0 | 2 | – | – | – | – | – | |
| Lauko, Jakub | Czech Republic | C | 2022–2025 | 101 | 8 | 14 | 22 | 63 | 8 | 1 | 1 | 2 | 6 | |
| Lauzon, Jeremy | Canada | D | 2018–2021 | 76 | 3 | 8 | 11 | 71 | 13 | 0 | 0 | 0 | 20 | |
| Lavoie, Dominic | Canada | D | 1992–1993 | 2 | 0 | 0 | 0 | 0 | – | – | – | – | – | |
| Lawton, Brian | United States | LW | 1989–1990 | 8 | 0 | 0 | 0 | 14 | – | – | – | – | – | |
| Laycoe, Hal | Canada | D | 1950–1956 | 326 | 20 | 52 | 72 | 178 | 31 | 2 | 4 | 6 | 26 | |
| Lazar, Curtis | Canada | C/RW | 2020–2022 | 87 | 10 | 10 | 20 | 22 | 17 | 1 | 1 | 2 | 2 | |
| Lazaro, Jeff | United States | LW | 1990–1992 | 76 | 8 | 19 | 27 | 98 | 28 | 3 | 3 | 6 | 32 | |
| Leach, Jay | United States | D | 2005–2006 | 2 | 0 | 0 | 0 | 7 | – | – | – | – | – | |
| Leach, Larry | Canada | C | 1958–1962 | 126 | 13 | 29 | 42 | 91 | 7 | 1 | 1 | 2 | 8 | |
| Leach, Reggie | Canada | RW | 1970–1972 | 79 | 9 | 17 | 26 | 12 | 3 | 0 | 0 | 0 | 0 | |
| Leach, Steve | United States | RW | 1991–1996 | 293 | 76 | 83 | 159 | 501 | 24 | 5 | 2 | 7 | 14 | |
| Leahy, Pat | United States | RW | 2003–2006 | 49 | 4 | 4 | 8 | 19 | – | – | – | – | – | |
| LeDuc, Rich | Canada | C | 1972–1974 | 33 | 4 | 4 | 8 | 14 | 5 | 0 | 0 | 0 | 9 | |
| Ledyard, Grant | Canada | D | 1997–1999 | 69 | 6 | 15 | 21 | 39 | 8 | 0 | 0 | 0 | 4 | |
| Leetch, Brian† | United States | D | 2005–2006 | 61 | 5 | 27 | 32 | 36 | – | – | – | – | – | HOF 2009 |
| Lefebvre, Guillaume | Canada | LW | 2009–2010 | 1 | 0 | 0 | 0 | 0 | – | – | – | – | – | |
| Lehmann, Tommy | Sweden | C | 1987–1989 | 35 | 5 | 5 | 10 | 16 | – | – | – | – | – | |
| Lehtonen, Mikko | Finland | RW | 2008–2010 | 2 | 0 | 0 | 0 | 0 | – | – | – | – | – | |
| Leiter, Bobby | Canada | C | 1962–1969 | 135 | 20 | 28 | 48 | 85 | – | – | – | – | – | |
| Lemay, Moe | Canada | LW | 1987–1989 | 14 | 0 | 0 | 0 | 23 | 15 | 4 | 2 | 6 | 32 | |
| Lesuk, Bill† | Canada | LW | 1968–1970 | 8 | 0 | 1 | 1 | 0 | 3 | 0 | 0 | 0 | 0 | SC 1970 |
| Leswick, Pete | Canada | W | 1944–1945 | 2 | 0 | 0 | 0 | 0 | – | – | – | – | – | |
| Lettieri, Vinni | United States | C | 2022–2023; 2024–2025 | 27 | 3 | 2 | 5 | 6 | – | – | – | – | – | |
| Leveille, Normand | Canada | LW | 1981–1983 | 75 | 17 | 25 | 42 | 49 | – | – | – | – | – | |
| Lewington, Tyler | Canada | D | 2021–2022 | 2 | 0 | 0 | 0 | 7 | – | – | – | – | – | |
| Liles, John-Michael | United States | D | 2015–2017 | 53 | 0 | 11 | 11 | 6 | 6 | 0 | 2 | 2 | 0 | |
| Lindblad, Matt | United States | C | 2013–2015 | 4 | 0 | 0 | 0 | 0 | – | – | – | – | – | |
| Lindholm, Elias* | Sweden | C | 2024–2026 | 151 | 34 | 61 | 95 | 52 | 6 | 2 | 0 | 2 | 2 | |
| Lindholm, Hampus* | Sweden | D | 2021–2026 | 247 | 21 | 96 | 117 | 185 | 30 | 1 | 5 | 6 | 20 | |
| Lindholm, Pär | Sweden | C | 2019–2021 | 41 | 3 | 3 | 6 | 4 | 6 | 0 | 0 | 0 | 2 | |
| Linseman, Ken | Canada | C | 1984–1990 | 389 | 125 | 247 | 372 | 744 | 35 | 16 | 22 | 38 | 103 | |
| Lohrei, Mason* | United States | D | 2023–2026 | 191 | 16 | 56 | 72 | 54 | 14 | 1 | 3 | 4 | 10 | |
| Lonsberry, Ross | Canada | LW | 1966–1969 | 33 | 2 | 3 | 5 | 16 | – | – | – | – | – | |
| Lorentz, Jim† | Canada | C/RW | 1968–1970 | 79 | 8 | 19 | 27 | 38 | 11 | 1 | 0 | 1 | 4 | SC 1970 |
| Lowe, Ross | Canada | D/LW | 1949–1951 | 46 | 5 | 3 | 8 | 40 | – | – | – | – | – | |
| Lucic, Milan† | Canada | LW | 2007–2015; 2023–2024 | 570 | 139 | 205 | 344 | 774 | 96 | 26 | 35 | 61 | 155 | SC 2011 |
| Lukowich, Morris | Canada | LW | 1984–1986 | 36 | 6 | 12 | 18 | 31 | 1 | 0 | 0 | 0 | 0 | |
| Lund, Pentti | Finland | RW | 1946–1953 | 77 | 8 | 14 | 22 | 2 | 7 | 1 | 0 | 1 | 0 | |
| Lynn, Vic | Canada | LW/D | 1950–1952 | 68 | 16 | 8 | 24 | 73 | 5 | 0 | 0 | 0 | 2 | |
| Lyons, Ron | Canada | LW | 1930–1931 | 12 | 0 | 0 | 0 | 10 | 5 | 0 | 0 | 0 | 0 | |
| Lysell, Fabian | Sweden | RW | 2024–2025 | 12 | 1 | 2 | 3 | 6 | – | – | – | – | – | |
| MacDermid, Lane | United States | LW | 2011–2013 | 8 | 0 | 0 | 0 | 15 | – | – | – | – | – | |
| MacDonald, Craig | Canada | LW | 2003–2004 | 18 | 0 | 3 | 3 | 8 | 1 | 0 | 0 | 0 | 0 | |
| MacDonald, Parker | Canada | C | 1965–1966 | 29 | 6 | 4 | 10 | 6 | – | – | – | – | – | |
| MacKay, Mickey† | Canada | C | 1928–1930 | 65 | 12 | 7 | 19 | 31 | 9 | 0 | 0 | 0 | 6 | HOF 1952, SC 1929 |
| MacKell, Fleming | Canada | C | 1951–1960 | 514 | 127 | 185 | 312 | 477 | 53 | 17 | 33 | 50 | 49 | |
| MacTavish, Craig | Canada | C | 1979–1984 | 217 | 44 | 66 | 110 | 74 | 28 | 5 | 4 | 9 | 25 | |
| Makela, Mikko | Finland | LW | 1994–1995 | 11 | 1 | 2 | 3 | 0 | – | – | – | – | – | |
| Malkoc, Dean | Canada | D | 1996–1998 | 73 | 1 | 0 | 1 | 156 | – | – | – | – | – | |
| Mallette, Troy | Canada | LW | 1996–1997 | 68 | 6 | 8 | 14 | 155 | – | – | – | – | – | |
| Maloney, Phil | Canada | C | 1949–1951 | 83 | 17 | 31 | 48 | 8 | – | – | – | – | – | |
| Maluta, Ray | Canada | D | 1975–1977 | 25 | 2 | 3 | 5 | 6 | 2 | 0 | 0 | 0 | 0 | |
| Manlow, Eric | Canada | C | 2000–2002 | 11 | 0 | 1 | 1 | 2 | – | – | – | – | – | |
| Mann, Cameron | Canada | RW | 1997–2001 | 89 | 14 | 10 | 24 | 40 | 1 | 0 | 0 | 0 | 0 | |
| Manson, Ray | Canada | LW | 1947–1948 | 1 | 0 | 0 | 0 | 0 | – | – | – | – | – | |
| Mantha, Sylvio† | Canada | D | 1936–1937 | 4 | 0 | 0 | 0 | 2 | – | – | – | – | – | HOF 1960 |
| Mara, Paul | United States | D | 2006–2007 | 59 | 3 | 15 | 18 | 95 | – | – | – | – | – | |
| Marchand, Brad† | Canada | LW | 2009–2025 | 1090 | 422 | 554 | 976 | 1113 | 157 | 56 | 82 | 138 | 159 | SC 2011 |
| Marcotte, Don† | Canada | LW | 1965–1982 | 868 | 230 | 254 | 484 | 317 | 132 | 34 | 27 | 61 | 81 | SC 1970, SC 1972 |
| Mario, Frank | Canada | C | 1941–1945 | 53 | 9 | 19 | 28 | 24 | – | – | – | – | – | |
| Markwart, Nevin | Canada | LW | 1983–1992 | 299 | 39 | 67 | 106 | 769 | 19 | 1 | 0 | 1 | 33 | |
| Marois, Daniel | Canada | RW | 1993–1994 | 22 | 7 | 3 | 10 | 18 | 11 | 0 | 1 | 1 | 16 | |
| Maroon, Patrick | United States | LW | 2023–2024 | 2 | 0 | 0 | 0 | 0 | 13 | 0 | 2 | 2 | 18 | |
| Marotte, Gilles | Canada | D | 1965–1967 | 118 | 10 | 25 | 35 | 166 | – | – | – | – | – | |
| Marquess, Mark | Canada | RW | 1946–1947 | 27 | 5 | 4 | 9 | 6 | 4 | 0 | 0 | 0 | 0 | |
| Martin, Clare | Canada | D | 1941–1948 | 78 | 8 | 14 | 22 | 38 | 12 | 0 | 1 | 1 | 0 | |
| Martin, Frank | Canada | D | 1952–1954 | 82 | 3 | 19 | 22 | 44 | 10 | 0 | 2 | 2 | 2 | |
| Martin, Pit | Canada | C | 1965–1967 | 111 | 36 | 33 | 69 | 50 | – | – | – | – | – | |
| Mathieu, Marquis | United States | C | 1998–2001 | 16 | 0 | 2 | 2 | 14 | – | – | – | – | – | |
| Matte, Joe | Canada | D | 1925–1926 | 4 | 0 | 0 | 0 | 0 | – | – | – | – | – | |
| Maxner, Wayne | Canada | LW | 1964–1966 | 61 | 8 | 9 | 17 | 48 | – | – | – | – | – | |
| May, Alan | Canada | RW | 1987–1988 | 3 | 0 | 0 | 0 | 15 | – | – | – | – | – | |
| McAtee, Norm | Canada | C | 1946–1947 | 13 | 0 | 1 | 1 | 0 | – | – | – | – | – | |
| McAvoy, Charlie* | United States | D | 2016–2026 | 573 | 71 | 290 | 361 | 491 | 97 | 6 | 44 | 50 | 103 | |
| McCarthy, Sandy | Canada | RW | 2003–2004 | 37 | 3 | 1 | 4 | 28 | – | – | – | – | – | |
| McCarthy, Tom | Canada | LW | 1986–1988 | 75 | 32 | 34 | 66 | 37 | 17 | 4 | 5 | 9 | 22 | |
| McCarthy, Tom | Canada | LW | 1960–1961 | 24 | 4 | 5 | 9 | 0 | – | – | – | – | – | |
| McCleary, Trent | Canada | RW | 1996–1997 | 59 | 3 | 5 | 8 | 33 | – | – | – | – | – | |
| McCord, Bob | Canada | D | 1963–1965 | 108 | 1 | 15 | 16 | 70 | – | – | – | – | – | |
| McCrimmon, Brad | Canada | D | 1979–1982 | 228 | 17 | 37 | 54 | 325 | 15 | 1 | 2 | 3 | 32 | |
| McDonald, Ab | Canada | LW | 1964–1965 | 60 | 9 | 9 | 18 | 6 | – | – | – | – | – | |
| McEachern, Shawn | United States | RW | 1995–1996; 2005–2006 | 110 | 26 | 35 | 61 | 56 | 5 | 2 | 1 | 3 | 8 | |
| McGill, Jack | Canada | C | 1941–1947 | 98 | 23 | 36 | 59 | 42 | 27 | 7 | 4 | 11 | 17 | |
| McGillis, Dan | Canada | D | 2002–2004 | 90 | 5 | 24 | 29 | 75 | 12 | 3 | 0 | 3 | 4 | |
| McInenly, Bert | Canada | LW/D | 1933–1936 | 42 | 2 | 1 | 3 | 26 | 4 | 0 | 0 | 0 | 2 | |
| McInnis, Marty | United States | RW | 2001–2003 | 96 | 11 | 13 | 24 | 46 | 11 | 1 | 1 | 2 | 2 | |
| McIntyre, Jack | Canada | D | 1949–1953 | 123 | 19 | 35 | 54 | 49 | 19 | 5 | 4 | 9 | 4 | |
| McKechnie, Walt | Canada | C | 1974–1975 | 53 | 3 | 3 | 6 | 8 | – | – | – | – | – | |
| McKegg, Greg | Canada | C | 2020–2021 | 5 | 1 | 0 | 1 | 2 | – | – | – | – | – | |
| McKenney, Don | Canada | C | 1954–1963 | 592 | 195 | 267 | 462 | 183 | 34 | 13 | 20 | 33 | 10 | |
| McKenzie, John† | Canada | RW | 1965–1972 | 454 | 169 | 227 | 396 | 710 | 50 | 15 | 30 | 45 | 119 | SC 1970, SC 1972 |
| McKim, Andrew | Canada | C | 1992–1994 | 36 | 1 | 4 | 5 | 4 | – | – | – | – | – | |
| McLaren, Kyle | Canada | D | 1995–2002 | 417 | 34 | 90 | 124 | 370 | 27 | 1 | 3 | 4 | 48 | |
| McLaughlin, Marc | United States | F | 2021–2025 | 26 | 6 | 0 | 6 | 10 | – | – | – | – | – | |
| McLellan, Scott | Canada | RW | 1982–1983 | 2 | 0 | 0 | 0 | 0 | – | – | – | – | – | |
| McMahon, Mike | Canada | D | 1945–1946 | 2 | 0 | 0 | 0 | 2 | – | – | – | – | – | |
| McManus, Sammy | Canada | LW | 1936–1937 | 1 | 0 | 0 | 0 | 0 | – | – | – | – | – | |
| McNab, Peter | Canada | C | 1976–1984 | 595 | 263 | 324 | 587 | 111 | 79 | 38 | 36 | 74 | 16 | |
| McQuaid, Adam† | Canada | D | 2009–2018 | 462 | 13 | 53 | 66 | 652 | 68 | 3 | 8 | 11 | 30 | SC 2011 |
| McReavy, Pat† | Canada | C | 1938–1942 | 22 | 0 | 2 | 2 | 4 | 11 | 2 | 2 | 4 | 5 | SC 1941 |
| McSorley, Marty | Canada | D/RW | 1999–2000 | 27 | 2 | 3 | 5 | 62 | – | – | – | – | – | |
| Megna, Jayson | United States | C | 2023–2024 | 1 | 0 | 0 | 0 | 0 | – | – | – | – | – | |
| Meeking, Harry | Canada | LW | 1926–1927 | 26 | 1 | 0 | 1 | 4 | 7 | 0 | 0 | 0 | 0 | |
| Meissner, Dick | Canada | RW | 1959–1962 | 135 | 8 | 10 | 18 | 37 | – | – | – | – | – | |
| Melnyk, Larry | Canada | D | 1980–1983 | 75 | 0 | 12 | 12 | 123 | 22 | 0 | 3 | 3 | 49 | |
| Merkulov, Georgii* | Russia | F | 2023–2026 | 11 | 0 | 1 | 1 | 2 | – | – | – | – | – | |
| Meszaros, Andrej | Slovakia | D | 2013–2014 | 14 | 2 | 3 | 5 | 6 | 4 | 0 | 2 | 2 | 2 | |
| Metropolit, Glen | Canada | C | 2007–2008 | 82 | 11 | 22 | 33 | 36 | 7 | 1 | 0 | 1 | 4 | |
| Mickoski, Nick | Canada | LW | 1959–1960 | 18 | 1 | 0 | 1 | 2 | – | – | – | – | – | |
| Middleton, Rick | Canada | RW | 1976–1988 | 881 | 402 | 496 | 898 | 124 | 111 | 45 | 55 | 100 | 17 | |
| Milbury, Mike | United States | D | 1975–1987 | 754 | 49 | 189 | 238 | 1552 | 86 | 4 | 24 | 28 | 219 | |
| Millar, Mike | Canada | RW | 1989–1990 | 15 | 1 | 4 | 5 | 0 | – | – | – | – | – | |
| Miller, Bob | United States | C | 1977–1981 | 263 | 55 | 82 | 137 | 143 | 34 | 4 | 6 | 10 | 27 | |
| Miller, Jay | United States | LW | 1985–1989 | 216 | 13 | 20 | 33 | 858 | 14 | 0 | 0 | 0 | 141 | |
| Miller, Kevan | United States | D | 2013–2021 | 352 | 13 | 58 | 71 | 281 | 33 | 1 | 6 | 7 | 16 | |
| Minten, Fraser* | Canada | C | 2024–2026 | 88 | 18 | 18 | 36 | 22 | 6 | 0 | 0 | 0 | 0 | |
| Mitchell, Herb | Canada | LW | 1924–1926 | 55 | 6 | 2 | 8 | 60 | – | – | – | – | – | |
| Mitchell, Ian | Canada | D | 2023–2025 | 28 | 0 | 3 | 3 | 12 | – | – | – | – | – | |
| Mittelstadt, Casey* | United States | C | 2024–2026 | 89 | 19 | 29 | 48 | 16 | 6 | 0 | 2 | 2 | 0 | |
| Moger, Sandy | Canada | C | 1994–1997 | 132 | 27 | 23 | 50 | 116 | 5 | 2 | 2 | 4 | 12 | |
| Mohns, Doug | Canada | LW/D | 1953–1964 | 711 | 118 | 229 | 347 | 677 | 35 | 6 | 15 | 21 | 40 | |
| Mokosak, Carl | Canada | LW | 1988–1989 | 7 | 0 | 0 | 0 | 31 | 1 | 0 | 0 | 0 | 0 | |
| Montador, Steve | Canada | D | 2008–2009 | 13 | 0 | 1 | 1 | 18 | 11 | 1 | 2 | 3 | 18 | |
| Moore, Dominic | Canada | C | 2016–2017 | 82 | 11 | 14 | 25 | 44 | 6 | 0 | 1 | 1 | 4 | |
| Moore, John | United States | D | 2018–2022 | 97 | 6 | 13 | 19 | 43 | 11 | 0 | 0 | 0 | 0 | |
| Moran, Ian | United States | D | 2002–2006 | 55 | 2 | 6 | 8 | 40 | 5 | 0 | 1 | 1 | 4 | |
| Morris, Bernie | Canada | C/RW | 1924–1925 | 6 | 1 | 1 | 2 | 0 | – | – | – | – | – | |
| Morris, Derek | Canada | D | 2009–2010 | 58 | 3 | 22 | 25 | 26 | – | – | – | – | – | |
| Morris, Jon | United States | C | 1993–1994 | 4 | 0 | 0 | 0 | 0 | – | – | – | – | – | |
| Morrison, Doug | Canada | RW | 1979–1985 | 23 | 7 | 3 | 10 | 15 | – | – | – | – | – | |
| Morrison, Jim | Canada | D | 1951–1952; 1958–1959 | 84 | 8 | 19 | 27 | 44 | 6 | 0 | 6 | 6 | 16 | |
| Morrisonn, Shaone | Canada | D | 2002–2004 | 41 | 1 | 7 | 8 | 18 | – | – | – | – | – | |
| Morrow, Joseph | Canada | D | 2014–2017 | 65 | 2 | 7 | 9 | 16 | 5 | 0 | 1 | 1 | 2 | |
| Mottau, Mike | United States | D | 2011–2012 | 6 | 0 | 0 | 0 | 0 | 2 | 0 | 0 | 0 | 0 | |
| Motter, Alex | Canada | C | 1934–1936 | 26 | 1 | 4 | 5 | 4 | 6 | 0 | 0 | 0 | 2 | |
| Mowers, Mark | United States | C | 2006–2007 | 78 | 5 | 12 | 17 | 26 | – | – | – | – | – | |
| Mullen, Joe† | United States | RW | 1995–1996 | 37 | 8 | 7 | 15 | 0 | – | – | – | – | – | HOF 2000 |
| Murphy, Gord | Canada | D | 1991–1993; 2001–2002 | 106 | 8 | 20 | 28 | 126 | 15 | 1 | 0 | 1 | 12 | |
| Murphy, Joe | Canada | RW | 1999–2000 | 26 | 7 | 7 | 14 | 41 | – | – | – | – | – | |
| Murphy, Ron | Canada | LW | 1965–1970 | 133 | 29 | 61 | 90 | 44 | 14 | 4 | 4 | 8 | 12 | |
| Murray, Glen | Canada | RW | 1991–1995; 2001–2008 | 570 | 209 | 180 | 389 | 408 | 55 | 12 | 13 | 25 | 44 | |
| Myhres, Brantt | Canada | RW | 2002–2003 | 1 | 0 | 0 | 0 | 31 | – | – | – | – | – | |
| Myrvold, Anders | Norway | D | 1996–1997 | 9 | 0 | 2 | 2 | 4 | – | – | – | – | – | |
| Nash, Rick | Canada | LW | 2017–2018 | 11 | 3 | 3 | 6 | 4 | 12 | 3 | 2 | 5 | 10 | |
| Nash, Riley | Canada | C | 2016–2018 | 157 | 22 | 36 | 58 | 32 | 15 | 0 | 3 | 3 | 6 | |
| Naslund, Mats | Sweden | LW | 1994–1995 | 34 | 8 | 14 | 22 | 4 | 5 | 1 | 0 | 1 | 0 | |
| Nazarov, Andrei | Russia | LW | 2000–2002 | 110 | 1 | 6 | 7 | 364 | – | – | – | – | – | |
| Neely, Cam† | Canada | RW | 1986–1996 | 525 | 344 | 246 | 590 | 921 | 86 | 55 | 32 | 87 | 160 | HOF 2005 |
| Neufeld, Ray | Canada | D | 1988–1990 | 11 | 0 | 0 | 0 | 0 | – | – | – | – | – | |
| Nicholson, Al | Canada | D | 1955–1957 | 11 | 0 | 0 | 0 | 0 | – | – | – | – | – | |
| Nickulas, Eric | United States | RW | 1998–2001; 2005–2006 | 45 | 7 | 10 | 17 | 24 | 1 | 0 | 0 | 0 | 0 | |
| Nicholson, Graeme | Canada | D | 1978–1979 | 1 | 0 | 0 | 0 | 0 | – | – | – | – | – | |
| Nielsen, Kirk | United States | RW | 1997–1998 | 6 | 0 | 0 | 0 | 0 | – | – | – | – | – | |
| Nienhuis, Kraig | Canada | LW | 1985–1988 | 87 | 20 | 16 | 36 | 39 | 2 | 0 | 0 | 0 | 14 | |
| Nilan, Chris | United States | RW | 1990–1992 | 80 | 11 | 14 | 25 | 463 | 19 | 0 | 2 | 2 | 62 | |
| Nill, Jim | Canada | RW | 1983–1985 | 76 | 4 | 11 | 15 | 143 | 3 | 0 | 0 | 0 | 4 | |
| Nokelainen, Petteri | Finland | C | 2007–2009 | 90 | 7 | 6 | 13 | 29 | 7 | 0 | 2 | 2 | 4 | |
| Nordstrom, Joakim | Sweden | C | 2018–2020 | 118 | 11 | 8 | 19 | 30 | 36 | 3 | 7 | 10 | 6 | |
| Nordstrom, Peter | Sweden | LW | 1998–1999 | 2 | 0 | 0 | 0 | 0 | – | – | – | – | – | |
| Norton, Jeff | United States | D | 2001–2002 | 3 | 0 | 1 | 1 | 0 | 3 | 0 | 0 | 0 | 5 | |
| Nosek, Tomas | Czech Republic | C | 2021–2023 | 141 | 10 | 25 | 35 | 80 | 14 | 0 | 4 | 4 | 0 | |
| Nowak, Hank | Canada | LW | 1974–1977 | 111 | 18 | 15 | 33 | 81 | 13 | 1 | 0 | 1 | 8 | |
| Nylander, Michael | Sweden | C | 2003–2004 | 15 | 1 | 11 | 12 | 14 | 6 | 3 | 3 | 6 | 0 | |
| O'Brien, Dennis | Canada | D | 1977–1980 | 83 | 4 | 11 | 15 | 138 | 14 | 0 | 1 | 1 | 28 | |
| O'Brien, Ellard | Canada | D | 1955–1956 | 2 | 0 | 0 | 0 | 0 | – | – | – | – | – | |
| O'Connell, Mike | United States | D | 1980–1986 | 424 | 70 | 199 | 269 | 312 | 39 | 7 | 15 | 22 | 34 | |
| O'Donnell, Fred | Canada | RW | 1972–1974 | 115 | 15 | 11 | 26 | 98 | 5 | 0 | 1 | 1 | 5 | |
| O'Donnell, Sean | Canada | D | 2001–2004 | 232 | 5 | 47 | 52 | 275 | 13 | 0 | 2 | 2 | 4 | |
| O'Dwyer, Billy | United States | C | 1987–1990 | 102 | 8 | 13 | 21 | 93 | 10 | 0 | 0 | 0 | 2 | |
| O'Gara, Rob | United States | D | 2016–2018 | 11 | 0 | 0 | 0 | 0 | – | – | – | – | – | |
| O'Neil, Jim | Canada | C/RW | 1933–1937 | 140 | 6 | 26 | 32 | 105 | 6 | 1 | 1 | 2 | 13 | |
| O'Neil, Paul | United States | C/RW | 1975–1976 | 1 | 0 | 0 | 0 | 0 | – | – | – | – | – | |
| O'Ree, Willie† | Canada | W | 1957–1961 | 45 | 4 | 10 | 14 | 26 | – | – | – | – | – | HOF 2018 |
| O'Reilly, Terry | Canada | RW | 1971–1985 | 891 | 204 | 402 | 606 | 2095 | 108 | 25 | 42 | 67 | 335 | |
| Oates, Adam† | Canada | C | 1991–1997 | 368 | 142 | 357 | 499 | 123 | 42 | 11 | 37 | 48 | 20 | HOF 2012 |
| Oddleifson, Chris | Canada | C | 1972–1974 | 55 | 10 | 11 | 21 | 25 | – | – | – | – | – | |
| Odgers, Jeff | Canada | RW | 1996–1997 | 80 | 7 | 8 | 15 | 197 | – | – | – | – | – | |
| Oesterle, Jordan | United States | D | 2024–2025 | 22 | 1 | 5 | 6 | 2 | – | – | – | – | – | |
| Oliver, Harry | Canada | RW | 1926–1934 | 353 | 109 | 59 | 168 | 129 | 31 | 9 | 4 | 13 | 24 | HOF 1967, SC 1929 |
| Oliver, Murray | Canada | C | 1960–1967 | 429 | 116 | 216 | 332 | 175 | – | – | – | – | – | |
| Oliwa, Krzysztof | Poland | LW | 2002–2003 | 33 | 0 | 0 | 0 | 110 | – | – | – | – | – | |
| Orlov, Dmitry | Russia | D | 2022–2023 | 23 | 4 | 13 | 17 | 12 | 7 | 0 | 8 | 8 | 2 | |
| Orr, Bobby | Canada | D | 1966–1976 | 631 | 264 | 624 | 888 | 924 | 74 | 26 | 66 | 92 | 107 | HOF 1979, SC 1970, SC 1972 |
| Orr, Colton | Canada | RW | 2003–2006 | 21 | 0 | 0 | 0 | 27 | – | – | – | – | – | |
| Ouellette, Gerry | Canada | RW | 1960–1961 | 35 | 5 | 4 | 9 | 0 | – | – | – | – | – | |
| Owen, George† | Canada | D | 1928–1933 | 183 | 44 | 33 | 77 | 151 | 21 | 2 | 5 | 7 | 25 | SC 1929 |
| Pachal, Clayton | Canada | C/LW | 1976–1978 | 11 | 0 | 0 | 0 | 26 | – | – | – | – | – | |
| Pahlsson, Samuel | Sweden | C | 2000–2001 | 17 | 1 | 1 | 2 | 6 | – | – | – | – | – | |
| Paille, Daniel† | Canada | LW | 2009–2015 | 375 | 50 | 45 | 95 | 81 | 74 | 9 | 10 | 19 | 10 | SC 2011 |
| Palazzari, Aldo | United States | RW | 1943–1944 | 24 | 6 | 3 | 9 | 4 | – | – | – | – | – | |
| Palmer, Brad | Canada | LW | 1982–1983 | 73 | 6 | 11 | 17 | 18 | 7 | 1 | 0 | 1 | 0 | |
| Panagabko, Ed | Canada | C | 1955–1957 | 29 | 0 | 3 | 3 | 38 | – | – | – | – | – | |
| Pandolfo, Jay | United States | LW | 2012–2013 | 18 | 0 | 0 | 0 | 2 | – | – | – | – | – | |
| Panteleev, Grigori | Latvia | LW | 1992–1995 | 50 | 8 | 6 | 14 | 12 | – | – | – | – | – | |
| Parise, J. P. | Canada | LW | 1965–1967 | 21 | 2 | 2 | 4 | 10 | – | – | – | – | – | |
| Park, Brad† | Canada | D | 1975–1983 | 501 | 100 | 317 | 417 | 553 | 91 | 23 | 55 | 78 | 77 | HOF 1988 |
| Pasin, Dave | Canada | RW | 1985–1986 | 71 | 18 | 19 | 37 | 50 | 3 | 0 | 1 | 1 | 0 | |
| Pastrnak, David* | Czech Republic | RW | 2014–2026 | 833 | 420 | 513 | 933 | 414 | 96 | 42 | 52 | 94 | 65 | |
| Patterson, George | Canada | W | 1933–1934 | 6 | 0 | 1 | 1 | 2 | – | – | – | – | – | |
| Payne, Davis | Canada | LW | 1995–1997 | 22 | 0 | 1 | 1 | 14 | – | – | – | – | – | |
| Pedersen, Allen | Canada | D | 1986–1991 | 333 | 4 | 31 | 35 | 408 | 64 | 0 | 0 | 0 | 91 | |
| Pederson, Barry | Canada | C | 1980–1986; 1991–1992 | 379 | 166 | 251 | 417 | 248 | 34 | 22 | 30 | 52 | 25 | |
| Peeke, Andrew* | United States | D | 2023–2026 | 168 | 6 | 27 | 33 | 45 | 12 | 0 | 1 | 1 | 16 | |
| Peirson, Johnny | Canada | RW | 1946–1958 | 544 | 153 | 173 | 326 | 309 | 48 | 10 | 16 | 26 | 26 | |
| Pellerin, Scott | Canada | LW | 2001–2002 | 35 | 1 | 5 | 6 | 6 | – | – | – | – | – | |
| Pelletier, Pascal | Canada | LW | 2007–2008 | 6 | 0 | 0 | 0 | 0 | – | – | – | – | – | |
| Penner, Jeff | Canada | D | 2009–2010 | 2 | 0 | 0 | 0 | 0 | – | – | – | – | – | |
| Pennington, Cliff | Canada | C | 1961–1963 | 98 | 16 | 42 | 58 | 6 | – | – | – | – | – | |
| Peters, Garry† | Canada | C | 1971–1972 | 2 | 0 | 0 | 0 | 0 | 1 | 0 | 0 | 0 | 0 | SC 1972 |
| Peters, Jimmy | Canada | RW | 1947–1949 | 97 | 28 | 29 | 57 | 44 | 9 | 1 | 3 | 4 | 2 | |
| Pettinger, Eric | Canada | LW/C | 1928–1929 | 18 | 0 | 0 | 0 | 17 | – | – | – | – | – | |
| Pettinger, Gord† | Canada | C | 1937–1940 | 106 | 20 | 28 | 48 | 20 | 15 | 1 | 1 | 2 | 7 | SC 1939 |
| Peverley, Rich† | Canada | C | 2010–2013 | 127 | 21 | 46 | 67 | 40 | 53 | 9 | 10 | 19 | 33 | SC 2011 |
| Pidhirny, Harry | Canada | C | 1957–1958 | 2 | 0 | 0 | 0 | 0 | – | – | – | – | – | |
| Plett, Willi | Canada | RW | 1987–1988 | 65 | 2 | 3 | 5 | 170 | 17 | 2 | 4 | 6 | 74 | |
| Podloski, Ray | Canada | C | 1988–1989 | 8 | 0 | 1 | 1 | 17 | – | – | – | – | – | |
| Poile, Bud† | Canada | RW | 1949–1950 | 38 | 16 | 14 | 30 | 6 | – | – | – | – | – | HOF 1990 |
| Poitras, Matthew* | Canada | C | 2023–2026 | 69 | 7 | 20 | 27 | 18 | – | – | – | – | – | |
| Poliziani, Daniel | Canada | RW | 1958–1959 | 1 | 0 | 0 | 0 | 0 | 3 | 0 | 0 | 0 | 0 | |
| Popiel, Poul | United States | D | 1965–1966 | 4 | 0 | 1 | 1 | 2 | – | – | – | – | – | |
| Popovic, Peter | Sweden | D | 2000–2001 | 60 | 1 | 6 | 7 | 48 | – | – | – | – | – | |
| Portland, Jack† | Canada | D | 1934–1940 | 188 | 7 | 20 | 27 | 148 | 18 | 0 | 0 | 0 | 19 | SC 1939 |
| Postma, Paul | Canada | D | 2017–2018 | 14 | 0 | 1 | 1 | 2 | – | – | – | – | – | |
| Potter, Corey | United States | D | 2013–2014 | 3 | 0 | 0 | 0 | 0 | 1 | 0 | 0 | 0 | 0 | |
| Potvin, Marc | Canada | RW | 1994–1996 | 33 | 0 | 1 | 1 | 16 | 5 | 0 | 1 | 1 | 18 | |
| Poulin, Dave | Canada | C | 1989–1993 | 165 | 34 | 68 | 102 | 117 | 53 | 12 | 18 | 30 | 60 | |
| Pouliot, Benoit | Canada | LW | 2011–2012 | 74 | 16 | 16 | 32 | 38 | 7 | 1 | 1 | 2 | 6 | |
| Prajsler, Petr | Czechoslovakia | D | 1991–1992 | 3 | 0 | 0 | 0 | 2 | – | – | – | – | – | |
| Pratt, Babe† | Canada | D | 1946–1947 | 31 | 4 | 4 | 8 | 25 | – | – | – | – | – | HOF 1966 |
| Pratt, Jack | Canada | C/D | 1930–1932 | 37 | 2 | 0 | 2 | 42 | 4 | 0 | 0 | 0 | 0 | |
| Prentice, Dean | Canada | LW | 1962–1966 | 170 | 50 | 56 | 106 | 63 | – | – | – | – | – | |
| Primeau, Wayne | Canada | C | 2005–2007 | 101 | 13 | 16 | 29 | 115 | – | – | – | – | – | |
| Pronger, Sean | Canada | C | 1999–2000 | 11 | 0 | 1 | 1 | 0 | – | – | – | – | – | |
| Pronovost, Andre | Canada | LW | 1960–1963 | 138 | 26 | 21 | 47 | 110 | – | – | – | – | – | |
| Propp, Brian | Canada | LW | 1989–1990 | 14 | 3 | 9 | 12 | 10 | 20 | 4 | 9 | 13 | 2 | |
| Prpic, Joel | Canada | C | 1997–2000 | 15 | 0 | 3 | 3 | 2 | – | – | – | – | – | |
| Pusie, Jean | Canada | D | 1934–1935 | 8 | 1 | 0 | 1 | 0 | 4 | 0 | 0 | 0 | 0 | |
| Quackenbush, Bill† | Canada | D | 1949–1956 | 461 | 22 | 133 | 155 | 46 | 33 | 0 | 13 | 13 | 4 | HOF 1976 |
| Quackenbush, Max | Canada | D | 1950–1951 | 47 | 4 | 6 | 10 | 26 | 6 | 0 | 0 | 0 | 4 | |
| Quilty, John | Canada | C | 1947–1948 | 10 | 3 | 1 | 4 | 2 | – | – | – | – | – | |
| Quintal, Stephane | Canada | D | 1988–1992 | 158 | 8 | 19 | 27 | 217 | 3 | 0 | 1 | 1 | 7 | |
| Randell, Tyler | Canada | RW | 2015–2016 | 27 | 6 | 0 | 6 | 47 | – | – | – | – | – | |
| Ranieri, George | Canada | LW | 1956–1957 | 2 | 0 | 0 | 0 | 0 | – | – | – | – | – | |
| Ratelle, Jean† | Canada | C | 1975–1981 | 419 | 155 | 295 | 450 | 84 | 58 | 23 | 33 | 56 | 10 | HOF 1985 |
| Rathwell, Jake | Canada | RW | 1974–1975 | 1 | 0 | 0 | 0 | 0 | – | – | – | – | – | |
| Ravlich, Matt | Canada | D | 1962–1963; 1971–1973 | 33 | 1 | 2 | 3 | 2 | – | – | – | – | – | |
| Reardon, Terry† | Canada | C/RW | 1938–1941; 1945–1947 | 148 | 24 | 30 | 54 | 57 | 27 | 6 | 8 | 14 | 10 | SC 1941 |
| Reasoner, Marty | United States | C | 2005–2006 | 19 | 2 | 6 | 8 | 8 | – | – | – | – | – | |
| Recchi, Mark† | Canada | RW | 2008–2011 | 180 | 42 | 65 | 107 | 71 | 49 | 14 | 16 | 30 | 16 | HOF 2017, SC 2011 |
| Redahl, Gord | Canada | RW | 1958–1959 | 18 | 0 | 1 | 1 | 0 | – | – | – | – | – | |
| Redden, Wade | Canada | D | 2012–2013 | 6 | 1 | 1 | 2 | 0 | 5 | 1 | 1 | 2 | 0 | |
| Redding, George | Canada | LW/D | 1924–1926 | 33 | 3 | 2 | 5 | 10 | – | – | – | – | – | |
| Redmond, Dick | Canada | D | 1978–1982 | 235 | 36 | 79 | 115 | 124 | 26 | 1 | 7 | 8 | 13 | |
| Regan, Larry | Canada | RW | 1956–1959 | 164 | 30 | 53 | 83 | 61 | 20 | 3 | 10 | 13 | 14 | |
| Reichel, Lukas* | Germany | LW | 2025–2026 | 10 | 1 | 2 | 3 | 0 | 1 | 0 | 0 | 0 | 0 | |
| Reibel, Earl | Canada | C | 1958–1959 | 63 | 6 | 8 | 14 | 14 | 4 | 0 | 0 | 0 | 0 | |
| Reich, Jeremy | Canada | LW | 2006–2008 | 90 | 2 | 3 | 5 | 141 | 4 | 0 | 0 | 0 | 8 | |
| Reid, Dave | Canada | LW | 1983–1988; 1991–1996 | 387 | 89 | 92 | 181 | 115 | 45 | 5 | 8 | 13 | 8 | |
| Reigle, Ed | Canada | D | 1950–1951 | 17 | 0 | 2 | 2 | 25 | – | – | – | – | – | |
| Reilly, Mike | United States | D | 2020–2023 | 95 | 4 | 22 | 26 | 38 | 16 | 0 | 4 | 4 | 10 | |
| Renouf, Dan | Canada | D | 2022–2023 | 1 | 0 | 0 | 0 | 0 | – | – | – | – | – | |
| Richard, Anthony | Canada | C | 2023–2024 | 9 | 1 | 2 | 3 | 2 | – | – | – | – | – | |
| Richer, Stephane | Canada | D | 1992–1993 | 21 | 1 | 4 | 5 | 18 | 3 | 0 | 0 | 0 | 0 | |
| Richter, Barry | United States | D | 1996–1997 | 50 | 5 | 13 | 18 | 32 | – | – | – | – | – | |
| Riley, Jack | Canada | C | 1935–1936 | 6 | 0 | 0 | 0 | 0 | – | – | – | – | – | |
| Rinaldo, Zac | Canada | C | 2015–2016 | 52 | 1 | 2 | 3 | 83 | – | – | – | – | – | |
| Ripley, Vic | Canada | LW | 1932–1934 | 37 | 4 | 6 | 10 | 25 | 5 | 1 | 0 | 1 | 0 | |
| Ritchie, Brett | Canada | RW | 2019–2020 | 27 | 2 | 4 | 6 | 21 | – | – | – | – | – | |
| Ritchie, Nick | Canada | LW | 2019–2021 | 63 | 16 | 12 | 28 | 56 | 19 | 2 | 3 | 5 | 26 | |
| Rittinger, Al | Canada | W | 1943–1944 | 19 | 3 | 7 | 10 | 0 | – | – | – | – | – | |
| Rivers, Jamie | Canada | D | 2001–2002 | 64 | 4 | 2 | 6 | 45 | 3 | 0 | 0 | 0 | 0 | |
| Rivers, Wayne | Canada | RW | 1963–1967 | 80 | 11 | 26 | 37 | 86 | – | – | – | – | – | |
| Roberts, Doug | United States | RW | 1971–1974 | 55 | 5 | 8 | 13 | 9 | 5 | 2 | 0 | 2 | 6 | |
| Roberts, Gordie | United States | D | 1992–1994 | 124 | 6 | 18 | 24 | 145 | 16 | 0 | 1 | 1 | 14 | |
| Robins, Bobby | United States | C | 2014–2015 | 3 | 0 | 0 | 0 | 14 | – | – | – | – | – | |
| Robinson, Nathan | Canada | C | 2005–2006 | 2 | 0 | 0 | 0 | 0 | – | – | – | – | – | |
| Robitaille, Randy | Canada | C | 1996–1999 | 9 | 0 | 2 | 2 | 0 | 1 | 0 | 0 | 0 | 0 | |
| Roche, Earl | Canada | LW | 1932–1933 | 3 | 0 | 0 | 0 | 0 | – | – | – | – | – | |
| Rodden, Eddie | Canada | C | 1928–1929 | 11 | 0 | 0 | 0 | 10 | – | – | – | – | – | |
| Rohloff, Jon | United States | D | 1994–1997 | 150 | 7 | 25 | 32 | 129 | 10 | 1 | 2 | 3 | 8 | |
| Rolfe, Dale | Canada | D | 1959–1960 | 3 | 0 | 0 | 0 | 0 | – | – | – | – | – | |
| Rolston, Brian | United States | C | 1999–2004; 2011–2012 | 359 | 104 | 147 | 251 | 144 | 25 | 6 | 5 | 11 | 8 | |
| Ronty, Paul | Canada | C | 1947–1951 | 224 | 56 | 98 | 154 | 39 | 16 | 1 | 7 | 8 | 4 | |
| Rowe, Bobby | Canada | RW/D | 1924–1925 | 4 | 1 | 0 | 1 | 0 | – | – | – | – | – | |
| Roy, Andre | United States | RW | 1995–1997 | 13 | 0 | 2 | 2 | 12 | – | – | – | – | – | |
| Roy, Jean-Yves | Canada | RW | 1996–1998 | 54 | 10 | 15 | 25 | 22 | – | – | – | – | – | |
| Rozzini, Gino | Canada | C | 1944–1945 | 31 | 5 | 10 | 15 | 20 | 6 | 1 | 2 | 3 | 6 | |
| Ruhnke, Kent | Canada | RW | 1975–1976 | 2 | 0 | 1 | 1 | 0 | – | – | – | – | – | |
| Runge, Paul | Canada | C/LW | 1930–1932; 1935–1936 | 48 | 8 | 3 | 11 | 22 | 2 | 0 | 0 | 0 | 2 | |
| Ruzicka, Vladimir | Czechoslovakia; Czech Republic | C | 1990–1993 | 166 | 66 | 66 | 132 | 105 | 30 | 4 | 14 | 18 | 2 | |
| Ryder, Michael† | Canada | RW | 2008–2011 | 235 | 63 | 64 | 127 | 87 | 49 | 17 | 18 | 35 | 18 | SC 2011 |
| Samsonov, Sergei | Russia | C | 1997–2006 | 514 | 164 | 212 | 376 | 103 | 35 | 9 | 15 | 24 | 0 | |
| Samuelsson, Martin | Sweden | RW | 2002–2004 | 14 | 0 | 1 | 1 | 2 | – | – | – | – | – | |
| Sanderson, Derek† | Canada | C | 1965–1974 | 389 | 135 | 159 | 294 | 686 | 50 | 17 | 12 | 29 | 187 | SC 1970, SC 1972 |
| Sandford, Ed | Canada | LW | 1947–1955 | 442 | 94 | 136 | 230 | 299 | 42 | 13 | 11 | 24 | 27 | |
| Sands, Charlie† | Canada | C/RW | 1934–1939 | 212 | 63 | 41 | 104 | 36 | 13 | 2 | 3 | 5 | 0 | SC 1939 |
| Sarner, Craig | United States | RW | 1974–1975 | 7 | 0 | 0 | 0 | 0 | – | – | – | – | – | |
| Satan, Miroslav | Slovakia | LW/RW | 2009–2010 | 38 | 9 | 5 | 14 | 12 | 13 | 5 | 5 | 10 | 16 | |
| Sather, Glen† | Canada | LW | 1966–1969 | 146 | 12 | 23 | 35 | 101 | 13 | 0 | 0 | 0 | 18 | HOF 1997 |
| Sauve, Maxime | Canada | C | 2011–2012 | 1 | 0 | 0 | 0 | 0 | – | – | – | – | – | |
| Savage, Andre | Canada | C | 1998–2001 | 50 | 8 | 13 | 21 | 10 | – | – | – | – | – | |
| Savage, Tony | Canada | D | 1934–1935 | 8 | 0 | 0 | 0 | 2 | – | – | – | – | – | |
| Savard, Andre | Canada | C | 1973–1976 | 228 | 52 | 62 | 114 | 144 | 31 | 5 | 7 | 12 | 35 | |
| Savard, Marc | Canada | C | 2006–2011 | 304 | 74 | 231 | 305 | 275 | 25 | 8 | 14 | 22 | 22 | |
| Sawyer, Kevin | Canada | LW | 1995–1997 | 4 | 0 | 0 | 0 | 5 | – | – | – | – | – | |
| Scatchard, Dave | Canada | C | 2005–2006 | 16 | 4 | 6 | 10 | 28 | – | – | – | – | – | |
| Schaefer, Peter | Canada | LW | 2007–2008 | 63 | 9 | 17 | 26 | 18 | 7 | 1 | 3 | 4 | 0 | |
| Schaller, Tim | United States | LW | 2016–2018 | 141 | 19 | 17 | 36 | 65 | 17 | 1 | 2 | 3 | 4 | |
| Scherza, Chuck | Canada | LW/C | 1943–1944 | 9 | 1 | 1 | 2 | 6 | – | – | – | – | – | |
| Schmautz, Bobby | Canada | RW | 1973–1980 | 354 | 134 | 161 | 295 | 444 | 70 | 26 | 30 | 56 | 90 | |
| Schmidt, Clarence | United States | RW | 1943–1944 | 7 | 1 | 0 | 1 | 2 | – | – | – | – | – | |
| Schmidt, Jackie | Canada | LW | 1942–1943 | 45 | 6 | 7 | 13 | 6 | 5 | 0 | 0 | 0 | 0 | |
| Schmidt, Milt† | Canada | C/D | 1936–1955 | 776 | 229 | 346 | 575 | 466 | 86 | 24 | 25 | 49 | 64 | HOF 1961, SC 1939, SC 1941 |
| Schmidt, Otto | Canada | D | 1943–1944 | 2 | 0 | 0 | 0 | 0 | – | – | – | – | – | |
| Schnarr, Werner | Canada | C | 1924–1926 | 26 | 0 | 0 | 0 | 0 | – | – | – | – | – | |
| Schock, Danny† | Canada | LW | 1969–1971 | 6 | 0 | 0 | 0 | 0 | 1 | 0 | 0 | 0 | 0 | SC 1970 |
| Schock, Ron | Canada | C | 1963–1967 | 128 | 17 | 31 | 48 | 26 | – | – | – | – | – | |
| Schoenfeld, Jim | Canada | D | 1983–1984 | 39 | 0 | 2 | 2 | 20 | – | – | – | – | – | |
| Secord, Al | Canada | LW | 1978–1981 | 166 | 39 | 26 | 65 | 337 | 14 | 0 | 3 | 3 | 69 | |
| Seguin, Tyler† | Canada | C | 2010–2013 | 203 | 56 | 65 | 121 | 64 | 42 | 6 | 12 | 18 | 6 | SC 2011 |
| Seidenberg, Dennis† | Germany | D | 2009–2016 | 401 | 23 | 94 | 117 | 164 | 50 | 2 | 13 | 15 | 37 | SC 2011 |
| Senyshyn, Zachary | Canada | RW | 2018–2021 | 14 | 1 | 2 | 3 | 2 | – | – | – | – | – | |
| Serowik, Jeff | United States | D | 1994–1995 | 1 | 0 | 0 | 0 | 0 | – | – | – | – | – | |
| Shack, Eddie | Canada | LW | 1967–1969 | 120 | 34 | 30 | 64 | 181 | 13 | 0 | 3 | 3 | 29 | |
| Shaldybin, Evgeny | Russia | D | 1996–1997 | 3 | 1 | 0 | 1 | 0 | – | – | – | – | – | |
| Shanahan, Sean | Canada | C/RW | 1977–1978 | 6 | 0 | 0 | 0 | 7 | – | – | – | – | – | |
| Shannon, Gerry | Canada | LW | 1977–1978 | 39 | 1 | 2 | 3 | 10 | 4 | 0 | 0 | 0 | 2 | |
| Shattenkirk, Kevin | United States | D | 2023–2024 | 61 | 6 | 18 | 24 | 18 | 6 | 0 | 1 | 1 | 0 | |
| Shaw, David | Canada | D | 1992–1995 | 176 | 14 | 27 | 41 | 229 | 22 | 1 | 4 | 5 | 26 | |
| Shay, Norm | Canada | D/RW | 1924–1926 | 31 | 2 | 4 | 6 | 16 | – | – | – | – | – | |
| Sheppard, Gregg | Canada | C | 1972–1978 | 416 | 155 | 220 | 375 | 130 | 65 | 28 | 33 | 61 | 29 | |
| Sheppard, Johnny | Canada | LW | 1933–1934 | 3 | 0 | 0 | 0 | 0 | – | – | – | – | – | |
| Shewchuk, Jack | Canada | D | 1938–1945 | 187 | 9 | 19 | 28 | 160 | 20 | 0 | 1 | 1 | 29 | |
| Shields, Al | Canada | D | 1936–1937 | 19 | 0 | 4 | 4 | 12 | 3 | 0 | 0 | 0 | 2 | |
| Shill, Bill | Canada | RW | 1942–1947 | 79 | 21 | 13 | 34 | 18 | 7 | 1 | 2 | 3 | 2 | |
| Shill, Jack | Canada | C | 1934–1935 | 45 | 4 | 4 | 8 | 22 | 2 | 0 | 0 | 0 | 0 | |
| Shoebottom, Bruce | Canada | D | 1987–1991 | 35 | 1 | 4 | 5 | 53 | 14 | 1 | 2 | 3 | 77 | |
| Shore, Eddie† | Canada | D | 1926–1940 | 541 | 103 | 176 | 279 | 1090 | 52 | 7 | 11 | 18 | 183 | HOF 1947, SC 1929, SC 1939 |
| Siebert, Babe† | Canada | LW/D | 1933–1936 | 125 | 23 | 33 | 56 | 179 | 6 | 0 | 1 | 1 | 6 | HOF 1964 |
| Sigalet, Jonathan | Canada | D | 2006–2007 | 1 | 0 | 0 | 0 | 4 | – | – | – | – | – | |
| Silk, Dave | United States | RW | 1983–1985 | 64 | 20 | 22 | 42 | 86 | 3 | 0 | 0 | 0 | 7 | |
| Simmer, Charlie | Canada | LW | 1984–1987 | 198 | 98 | 94 | 192 | 136 | 9 | 2 | 2 | 4 | 8 | |
| Simmons, Al | Canada | D | 1973–1976 | 10 | 0 | 1 | 1 | 21 | 1 | 0 | 0 | 0 | 0 | |
| Simonetti, Frank | United States | D | 1984–1988 | 115 | 5 | 8 | 13 | 76 | 12 | 0 | 1 | 1 | 8 | |
| Sims, Al | Canada | D | 1973–1979 | 311 | 22 | 48 | 70 | 172 | 38 | 0 | 2 | 2 | 12 | |
| Skinner, Alf | Canada | RW | 1924–1925 | 10 | 0 | 1 | 1 | 17 | – | – | – | – | – | |
| Skriko, Petri | Finland | LW | 1990–1992 | 37 | 6 | 14 | 20 | 15 | 18 | 4 | 4 | 8 | 4 | |
| Slegr, Jiri | Czech Republic | D | 2003–2006 | 68 | 9 | 26 | 35 | 83 | 7 | 1 | 1 | 2 | 0 | |
| Sleigher, Louis | Canada | RW | 1984–1986 | 83 | 16 | 21 | 37 | 65 | 6 | 0 | 0 | 0 | 18 | |
| Smillie, Don | Canada | LW | 1933–1934 | 12 | 2 | 2 | 4 | 4 | – | – | – | – | – | |
| Smith, Alex | Canada | D | 1932–1934 | 61 | 9 | 10 | 19 | 60 | 5 | 0 | 2 | 2 | 8 | |
| Smith, Barry | Canada | C | 1975–1976 | 19 | 1 | 0 | 1 | 2 | – | – | – | – | – | |
| Smith, Brandon | Canada | D | 1998–2001 | 30 | 3 | 4 | 7 | 10 | – | – | – | – | – | |
| Smith, Craig | United States | C | 2020–2023 | 170 | 33 | 45 | 78 | 60 | 17 | 2 | 3 | 5 | 6 | |
| Smith, Dallas† | Canada | D | 1959–1977 | 860 | 54 | 248 | 302 | 932 | 85 | 3 | 28 | 31 | 128 | SC 1970, SC 1972 |
| Smith, Des† | Canada | D | 1939–1942 | 113 | 15 | 18 | 33 | 164 | 20 | 1 | 4 | 5 | 16 | SC 1941 |
| Smith, Floyd | Canada | RW | 1954–1957 | 27 | 0 | 1 | 1 | 4 | – | – | – | – | – | |
| Smith, Gemel | Canada | C | 2018–2019 | 3 | 0 | 0 | 0 | 0 | – | – | – | – | – | |
| Smith, Hooley† | Canada | C/RW | 1936–1937 | 44 | 8 | 10 | 18 | 36 | 3 | 0 | 0 | 0 | 0 | HOF 1972 |
| Smith, Kenny | Canada | LW | 1944–1951 | 331 | 78 | 93 | 171 | 49 | 30 | 8 | 13 | 21 | 6 | |
| Smith, Reilly | Canada | RW | 2013–2015 | 163 | 33 | 58 | 91 | 34 | 12 | 4 | 1 | 5 | 0 | |
| Smith, Rick† | Canada | D | 1968–1972; 1976–1980 | 513 | 36 | 125 | 161 | 389 | 75 | 3 | 22 | 25 | 69 | SC 1970 |
| Smolinski, Bryan | United States | C | 1992–1995 | 136 | 50 | 36 | 86 | 113 | 22 | 6 | 5 | 11 | 10 | |
| Sobotka, Vladimir | Czech Republic | C | 2007–2010 | 134 | 6 | 16 | 22 | 64 | 19 | 2 | 2 | 4 | 15 | |
| Soderberg, Carl | Sweden | C | 2012–2015 | 161 | 29 | 65 | 94 | 68 | 14 | 1 | 5 | 6 | 2 | |
| Soderstrom, Victor* | Sweden | D | 2025–2026 | 8 | 0 | 1 | 1 | 0 | – | – | – | – | – | |
| Songin, Tom | United States | RW | 1978–1981 | 43 | 5 | 5 | 10 | 22 | – | – | – | – | – | |
| Sparrow, Emory | Canada | RW/C | 1924–1925 | 8 | 0 | 0 | 0 | 4 | – | – | – | – | – | |
| Speer, Bill† | Canada | D | 1969–1971 | 28 | 1 | 3 | 4 | 8 | 8 | 1 | 0 | 1 | 4 | SC 1970 |
| Spencer, Irv | Canada | D | 1962–1963 | 69 | 5 | 17 | 22 | 34 | – | – | – | – | – | |
| Spooner, Ryan | Canada | C | 2012–2018 | 253 | 41 | 101 | 142 | 59 | 4 | 0 | 2 | 2 | 0 | |
| Spring, Frank | Canada | RW | 1969–1970 | 1 | 0 | 0 | 0 | 0 | – | – | – | – | – | |
| St. Pierre, Martin | Canada | C | 2008–2009 | 14 | 2 | 2 | 4 | 4 | – | – | – | – | – | |
| Stafford, Drew | United States | RW | 2016–2017 | 18 | 4 | 4 | 8 | 12 | 6 | 2 | 0 | 2 | 2 | |
| Staios, Steve | Canada | D | 1995–1997 | 66 | 3 | 8 | 11 | 75 | 3 | 0 | 0 | 0 | 0 | |
| Stanfield, Fred† | Canada | F | 1967–1973 | 448 | 135 | 274 | 409 | 82 | 55 | 17 | 29 | 46 | 6 | SC 1970, SC 1972 |
| Stanley, Allan† | Canada | D | 1956–1958 | 129 | 12 | 50 | 62 | 82 | 12 | 1 | 3 | 4 | 6 | HOF 1981 |
| Stanton, Paul | United States | D | 1993–1994 | 71 | 3 | 7 | 10 | 54 | – | – | – | – | – | |
| Stapleton, Pat | Canada | D | 1961–1963 | 90 | 2 | 8 | 10 | 50 | – | – | – | – | – | |
| Stasiuk, Vic | Canada | LW | 1955–1961 | 378 | 125 | 166 | 291 | 457 | 29 | 6 | 8 | 14 | 26 | |
| Stastny, Yan | United States | C | 2005–2007 | 38 | 1 | 5 | 6 | 29 | – | – | – | – | – | |
| Steen, Oskar | Sweden | C | 2020–2024 | 60 | 4 | 4 | 8 | 12 | – | – | – | – | – | |
| Steeves, Alex* | United States | F | 2025–2026 | 43 | 9 | 7 | 16 | 34 | 2 | 0 | 0 | 0 | 0 | |
| Stempniak, Lee | United States | RW | 2015–2016; 2018–2019 | 21 | 3 | 7 | 10 | 4 | – | – | – | – | – | |
| Stevens, Kevin | United States | LW | 1995–1996 | 41 | 10 | 13 | 23 | 49 | – | – | – | – | – | |
| Stevens, Mike | Canada | LW | 1987–1988 | 7 | 0 | 1 | 1 | 9 | – | – | – | – | – | |
| Stevens, Phil | Canada | C/D | 1925–1926 | 25 | 1 | 0 | 1 | 3 | – | – | – | – | – | |
| Stevenson, Shayne | Canada | RW | 1990–1992 | 19 | 0 | 1 | 1 | 28 | – | – | – | – | – | |
| Stewart, Allan | Canada | LW | 1991–1992 | 4 | 0 | 0 | 0 | 17 | – | – | – | – | – | |
| Stewart, Bob | Canada | D | 1971–1972 | 8 | 0 | 0 | 0 | 15 | – | – | – | – | – | |
| Stewart, Cam | Canada | LW | 1993–1997 | 83 | 3 | 7 | 10 | 72 | 13 | 1 | 3 | 4 | 9 | |
| Stewart, Nels† | Canada | C | 1932–1935; 1936–1937 | 153 | 64 | 55 | 119 | 181 | 9 | 2 | 1 | 3 | 4 | HOF 1952 |
| Stewart, Ron | Canada | RW | 1965–1967 | 126 | 34 | 26 | 60 | 50 | – | – | – | – | – | |
| Stock, P. J. | Canada | C | 2001–2004 | 130 | 1 | 12 | 13 | 282 | 6 | 1 | 0 | 1 | 19 | |
| Stralman, Anton | Sweden | D | 2022–2023 | 8 | 0 | 0 | 0 | 2 | – | – | – | – | – | |
| Stuart, Billy | Canada | D | 1924–1927 | 101 | 14 | 4 | 18 | 95 | 8 | 0 | 0 | 0 | 6 | |
| Stuart, Brad | Canada | D | 2005–2007 | 103 | 17 | 31 | 48 | 64 | – | – | – | – | – | |
| Stuart, Mark | United States | D | 2005–2011 | 283 | 13 | 27 | 40 | 284 | 22 | 0 | 2 | 2 | 21 | |
| Studnicka, Jack | Canada | C | 2019–2023 | 38 | 1 | 6 | 7 | 10 | 5 | 0 | 0 | 0 | 2 | |
| Stumpel, Jozef | Czechoslovakia; Slovakia | C | 1991–2003 | 424 | 75 | 206 | 281 | 80 | 34 | 2 | 13 | 15 | 4 | |
| Sturm, Marco | Germany | C | 2005–2010 | 302 | 106 | 87 | 193 | 156 | 14 | 2 | 2 | 4 | 10 | |
| Sullivan, Mike | United States | C | 1997–1998 | 77 | 5 | 13 | 18 | 34 | 6 | 0 | 1 | 1 | 2 | |
| Sullivan, Red | Canada | C | 1949–1953 | 102 | 15 | 21 | 36 | 32 | 12 | 0 | 0 | 0 | 2 | |
| Sutherland, Max | Canada | LW | 1931–1932 | 2 | 0 | 0 | 0 | 0 | – | – | – | – | – | |
| Sutter, Ron | Canada | C | 1995–1996 | 18 | 5 | 7 | 12 | 24 | 5 | 0 | 0 | 0 | 8 | |
| Sweeney, Bob | United States | C/RW | 1986–1992 | 382 | 81 | 112 | 193 | 509 | 87 | 13 | 16 | 29 | 185 | |
| Sweeney, Don | Canada | D | 1988–2003 | 1052 | 52 | 210 | 262 | 663 | 103 | 9 | 10 | 19 | 79 | |
| Sweeney, Tim | United States | LW | 1992–1993; 1995–1997 | 91 | 19 | 26 | 45 | 34 | 4 | 0 | 0 | 0 | 2 | |
| Szwarz, Jordan | Canada | RW | 2017–2018 | 12 | 0 | 3 | 3 | 2 | – | – | – | – | – | |
| Talbot, Maxime | Canada | C | 2014–2016 | 56 | 2 | 8 | 10 | 17 | – | – | – | – | – | |
| Tanabe, Dave | United States | D | 2005–2006 | 54 | 4 | 12 | 16 | 48 | – | – | – | – | – | |
| Tardif, Jamie | Canada | RW | 2012–2013 | 2 | 0 | 0 | 0 | 0 | – | – | – | – | – | |
| Tatarinov, Mikhail | Russia | D | 1993–1994 | 2 | 0 | 0 | 0 | 2 | – | – | – | – | – | |
| Taylor, Billy | Canada | C | 1947–1948 | 39 | 4 | 16 | 20 | 25 | – | – | – | – | – | |
| Taylor, Bob | United States | RW | 1929–1930 | 6 | 0 | 0 | 0 | 4 | – | – | – | – | – | |
| Taylor, Chris | Canada | C | 1998–1999 | 37 | 3 | 5 | 8 | 12 | – | – | – | – | – | |
| Taylor, Tim | Canada | C | 1997–1999 | 128 | 24 | 18 | 42 | 112 | 18 | 0 | 3 | 3 | 18 | |
| Teal, Skip | Canada | C | 1954–1955 | 1 | 0 | 0 | 0 | 0 | – | – | – | – | – | |
| Tenkrat, Petr | Czech Republic | RW | 2006–2007 | 64 | 9 | 5 | 14 | 34 | – | – | – | – | – | |
| Tessier, Orval | Canada | C | 1955–1956; 1960–1961 | 55 | 5 | 7 | 12 | 6 | – | – | – | – | – | |
| Thelin, Mats | Sweden | D | 1984–1987 | 163 | 8 | 19 | 27 | 176 | 5 | 0 | 0 | 0 | 6 | |
| Thelven, Michael | Sweden | D | 1985–1990 | 207 | 20 | 80 | 100 | 217 | 34 | 4 | 10 | 14 | 34 | |
| Thomlinson, Dave | Canada | LW | 1991–1992 | 12 | 0 | 1 | 1 | 17 | – | – | – | – | – | |
| Thompson, Cliff | United States | D | 1941–1942; 1948–1949 | 16 | 0 | 1 | 1 | 2 | – | – | – | – | – | |
| Thompson, Nate | United States | C | 2006–2007 | 4 | 0 | 0 | 0 | 0 | – | – | – | – | – | |
| Thoms, Bill | Canada | C | 1944–1945 | 17 | 4 | 2 | 6 | 0 | 1 | 0 | 0 | 0 | 2 | |
| Thornton, Joe | Canada | C | 1997–2006 | 532 | 169 | 285 | 454 | 617 | 35 | 6 | 12 | 18 | 41 | |
| Thornton, Shawn† | Canada | RW | 2007–2014 | 480 | 34 | 42 | 76 | 748 | 86 | 1 | 6 | 7 | 62 | SC 2011 |
| Timander, Mattias | Sweden | D | 1996–2000 | 146 | 2 | 23 | 25 | 52 | 4 | 1 | 1 | 2 | 2 | |
| Tinordi, Jarred | United States | D | 2020–2021 | 21 | 0 | 1 | 1 | 11 | 4 | 0 | 0 | 0 | 5 | |
| Tocchet, Rick | Canada | C | 1995–1997 | 67 | 32 | 22 | 54 | 131 | 5 | 4 | 0 | 4 | 21 | |
| Toppazzini, Jerry | Canada | RW | 1952–1954; 1955–1964 | 661 | 151 | 218 | 369 | 329 | 40 | 13 | 9 | 22 | 15 | |
| Toppazzini, Zellio | Canada | RW | 1948–1951 | 45 | 6 | 7 | 13 | 18 | 2 | 0 | 0 | 0 | 0 | |
| Touhey, Bill | Canada | LW | 1931–1932 | 26 | 5 | 2 | 7 | 14 | – | – | – | – | – | |
| Townshend, Graeme | Canada | RW | 1989–1991 | 22 | 2 | 5 | 7 | 19 | – | – | – | – | – | |
| Traverse, Patrick | Canada | D | 2000–2001 | 37 | 2 | 6 | 8 | 14 | – | – | – | – | – | |
| Trotman, Zach | United States | D | 2013–2016 | 67 | 3 | 9 | 12 | 22 | – | – | – | – | – | |
| Tufte, Riley* | United States | LW | 2024–2026 | 10 | 1 | 0 | 1 | 4 | – | – | – | – | – | |
| Turlik, Gord | Canada | LW/C | 1959–1960 | 2 | 0 | 0 | 0 | 2 | – | – | – | – | – | |
| Tuzzolino, Tony | United States | RW | 2001–2002 | 2 | 0 | 0 | 0 | 0 | – | – | – | – | – | |
| Vaakanainen, Urho | Finland | D | 2018–2022 | 31 | 0 | 6 | 6 | 6 | – | – | – | – | – | |
| Vadnais, Carol† | Canada | D | 1971–1976 | 263 | 47 | 134 | 181 | 433 | 39 | 2 | 19 | 21 | 93 | SC 1972 |
| Van Impe, Darren | Canada | D | 1997–2001 | 220 | 15 | 56 | 71 | 216 | 17 | 3 | 3 | 6 | 4 | |
| van Riemsdyk, James | United States | LW | 2023–2024 | 71 | 11 | 27 | 38 | 20 | 11 | 1 | 4 | 5 | 0 | |
| Vaske, Dennis | United States | D | 1998–1999 | 3 | 0 | 0 | 0 | 6 | – | – | – | – | – | |
| Vernarsky, Kris | United States | C | 2002–2004 | 17 | 1 | 0 | 1 | 2 | – | – | – | – | – | |
| Vesey, Jim | United States | C/RW | 1991–1992 | 4 | 0 | 0 | 0 | 0 | – | – | – | – | – | |
| Viel, Jeffrey* | Canada | F | 2024–2026 | 15 | 0 | 0 | 0 | 44 | – | – | – | – | – | |
| Virtue, Terry | Canada | D | 1998–1999 | 4 | 0 | 0 | 0 | 0 | – | – | – | – | – | |
| Von Stefenelli, Phil | Canada | D | 1995–1996 | 27 | 0 | 4 | 4 | 16 | – | – | – | – | – | |
| Wagner, Chris | United States | C | 2018–2023 | 186 | 20 | 14 | 34 | 122 | 38 | 4 | 1 | 5 | 8 | |
| Wahlstrom, Oliver | United States | RW | 2024–2025 | 16 | 1 | 1 | 2 | 28 | – | – | – | – | – | |
| Walter, Ben | Canada | C | 2005–2007 | 10 | 0 | 0 | 0 | 4 | – | – | – | – | – | |
| Walton, Mike† | Canada | C | 1970–1973; 1978–1979 | 168 | 60 | 57 | 117 | 92 | 25 | 9 | 7 | 16 | 34 | SC 1972 |
| Walz, Wes | Canada | C | 1989–1992 | 73 | 9 | 12 | 21 | 44 | 2 | 0 | 0 | 0 | 0 | |
| Ward, Aaron | Canada | D | 2006–2009 | 150 | 9 | 17 | 26 | 116 | 17 | 1 | 1 | 2 | 8 | |
| Ward, Dixon | Canada | RW | 2000–2001 | 63 | 5 | 13 | 18 | 65 | – | – | – | – | – | |
| Ward, Don | Canada | D | 1959–1960 | 31 | 0 | 1 | 1 | 18 | – | – | – | – | – | |
| Warsofsky, David | United States | D | 2013–2015 | 10 | 1 | 2 | 3 | 0 | – | – | – | – | – | |
| Warwick, Grant | Canada | RW | 1947–1949 | 76 | 28 | 20 | 48 | 24 | 10 | 2 | 3 | 5 | 4 | |
| Watson, Joe | Canada | D | 1964–1967 | 74 | 2 | 14 | 16 | 38 | – | – | – | – | – | |
| Webster, Tom | Canada | RW | 1968–1970 | 11 | 0 | 3 | 3 | 11 | 1 | 0 | 0 | 0 | 0 | |
| Weiland, Cooney† | Canada | C | 1928–1932; 1935–1939 | 365 | 131 | 107 | 238 | 125 | 36 | 10 | 8 | 18 | 8 | HOF 1971, SC 1929, SC 1939 |
| Weinrich, Eric | United States | D | 2000–2001 | 22 | 1 | 5 | 6 | 10 | – | – | – | – | – | |
| Wensink, John | Canada | LW | 1976–1980 | 248 | 57 | 55 | 112 | 429 | 39 | 2 | 6 | 8 | 86 | |
| Wesley, Glen | Canada | D | 1987–1994 | 537 | 77 | 230 | 307 | 421 | 105 | 15 | 32 | 47 | 109 | |
| Westfall, Ed† | Canada | D/RW | 1961–1972 | 733 | 126 | 213 | 339 | 410 | 50 | 13 | 17 | 30 | 29 | SC 1970, SC 1972 |
| Wheeler, Blake | United States | RW | 2008–2011 | 221 | 50 | 60 | 110 | 131 | 21 | 1 | 5 | 6 | 6 | |
| Whitfield, Trent | Canada | C | 2009–2012 | 17 | 0 | 1 | 1 | 7 | 4 | 0 | 0 | 0 | 0 | |
| Wideman, Dennis | Canada | D | 2006–2010 | 256 | 33 | 86 | 119 | 165 | 30 | 1 | 21 | 22 | 8 | |
| Wiemer, Jim | Canada | D | 1989–1994 | 201 | 11 | 47 | 58 | 259 | 40 | 2 | 7 | 9 | 36 | |
| Wilcox, Archie | Canada | RW/D | 1933–1934 | 13 | 0 | 1 | 1 | 2 | – | – | – | – | – | |
| Wilkins, Barry | Canada | D | 1966–1970 | 8 | 1 | 0 | 1 | 2 | – | – | – | – | – | |
| Wilkinson, John | Canada | D | 1943–1944 | 9 | 0 | 0 | 0 | 6 | – | – | – | – | – | |
| Williams, Burr | United States | D | 1934–1935 | 7 | 0 | 0 | 0 | 6 | – | – | – | – | – | |
| Williams, Tom | United States | RW | 1961–1969 | 391 | 96 | 136 | 232 | 111 | 4 | 1 | 0 | 1 | 2 | |
| Wilson, Gord | Canada | LW | 1954–1955 | – | – | – | – | – | 2 | 0 | 0 | 0 | 0 | |
| Wilson, Landon | United States | RW | 1996–2000 | 130 | 12 | 21 | 33 | 91 | 9 | 1 | 1 | 2 | 8 | |
| Wilson, Wally | Canada | C | 1947–1948 | 53 | 11 | 8 | 19 | 18 | 1 | 0 | 0 | 0 | 0 | |
| Wingels, Tommy | Canada | C | 2017–2018 | 18 | 2 | 3 | 5 | 2 | 4 | 0 | 0 | 0 | 0 | |
| Winnes, Chris | United States | RW | 1991–1993 | 29 | 1 | 4 | 5 | 6 | 1 | 0 | 0 | 0 | 0 | |
| Wiseman, Eddie† | Canada | RW | 1939–1942 | 111 | 30 | 52 | 82 | 18 | 22 | 8 | 4 | 12 | 2 | SC 1941 |
| Wotherspoon, Parker | Canada | D | 2023–2025 | 96 | 1 | 14 | 15 | 41 | 10 | 0 | 2 | 2 | 6 | |
| Woytowich, Bob | Canada | D | 1964–1967 | 154 | 6 | 34 | 40 | 134 | – | – | – | – | – | |
| Wozniewski, Andy | United States | D | 2009–2010 | 2 | 0 | 0 | 0 | 0 | – | – | – | – | – | |
| Yackel, Ken | United States | RW | 1958–1959 | 6 | 0 | 0 | 0 | 2 | 2 | 0 | 0 | 0 | 2 | |
| Yelle, Stephane | Canada | C | 2008–2009 | 77 | 7 | 11 | 18 | 32 | 11 | 0 | 1 | 1 | 2 | |
| York, Jason | Canada | D | 2006–2007 | 49 | 1 | 7 | 8 | 32 | – | – | – | – | – | |
| Young, C. J. | United States | RW | 1992–1993 | 15 | 4 | 5 | 9 | 12 | – | – | – | – | – | |
| Zacha, Pavel* | Czech Republic | C | 2022–2026 | 320 | 86 | 142 | 228 | 83 | 26 | 2 | 13 | 15 | 8 | |
| Zadorov, Nikita* | Russia | D | 2024–2026 | 162 | 6 | 38 | 44 | 297 | 6 | 0 | 1 | 1 | 37 | |
| Zamuner, Rob | Canada | LW | 2001–2004 | 178 | 26 | 24 | 50 | 58 | 18 | 0 | 2 | 2 | 8 | |
| Zanon, Greg | Canada | D | 2011–2012 | 17 | 1 | 1 | 2 | 4 | 7 | 0 | 1 | 1 | 0 | |
| Zanussi, Joe | Canada | D | 1975–1977 | 68 | 1 | 8 | 9 | 38 | 4 | 0 | 1 | 1 | 2 | |
| Zboril, Jakub | Czech Republic | D | 2018–2023 | 76 | 1 | 15 | 16 | 28 | – | – | – | – | – | |
| Zehr, Jeff | Canada | LW | 1999–2000 | 4 | 0 | 0 | 0 | 2 | – | – | – | – | – | |
| Zhamnov, Alexei | Russia | C | 2005–2006 | 24 | 1 | 9 | 10 | 30 | – | – | – | – | – | |
| Zholtok, Sergei | Latvia | C | 1992–1994 | 25 | 2 | 2 | 4 | 2 | – | – | – | – | – | |
| Zinovjev, Sergei | Russia | C | 2003–2004 | 10 | 0 | 1 | 1 | 2 | – | – | – | – | – | |
| Zombo, Rick | United States | D | 1995–1996 | 67 | 4 | 10 | 14 | 53 | – | – | – | – | – | |

== See also ==
- List of NHL players
