= 1968–69 Los Angeles Kings season =

National Hockey League team season

1968–69 Los Angeles Kings
- Division: 4th West
- 1968–69 record: 24–42–10
- Home record: 19–14–5
- Road record: 5–28–5
- Goals for: 185
- Goals against: 260

Team information
- General manager: Larry Regan
- Coach: Red Kelly
- Captain: Bob Wall
- Alternate captains: Bill White; Dale Rolfe; Eddie Joyal
- Arena: Los Angeles Forum

Team leaders
- Goals: Eddie Joyal (33)
- Assists: Real Lemieux (29)
- Points: Eddie Joyal (52)
- Penalty minutes: Dale Rolfe (85)
- Wins: Gerry Desjardins (18)
- Goals against average: Gerry Desjardins (3.26)

The 1968–69 Los Angeles Kings season was the second ever for the Los Angeles Kings in the National Hockey League (NHL). After finishing a surprising second place during the 1967–68 season, the Kings stumbled in their second regular season, finishing with a 24–42–10 record, good for 58 points and fourth place in the six-team Western Division. The Kings made the playoffs, losing in the West Division Final to the St. Louis Blues.

== Offseason ==
The Kings acquired goaltender Gerry Desjardins from the Montreal Canadiens in June, giving up two first-round picks. Goaltender Terry Sawchuk was traded to the Detroit Red Wings in October for Jimmy Peters Jr. On the same day the Kings picked up goaltender prospect Wayne Thomas of the University of Wisconsin from the Toronto Maple Leafs. Desjardins would play the majority of games with Wayne Rutledge his main backup.

== Regular season ==
The Kings second season began with playoff expectations following a second-place finish in their inaugural season. The Kings played well enough at home to be competitive for a playoff spot, but they only won 5 road games all season.

Attendance for the season exceeded 300,000 for the first time over a 38-game home schedule.

=== Season standings ===
West Division
		GP	W	L	T	GF	GA	DIFF	Pts
1	St. Louis Blues	76	37	25	14	204	157	+47	88
2	Oakland Seals	76	29	36	11	219	251	−32	69
3	Philadelphia Flyers	76	20	35	21	174	225	−51	61
4	Los Angeles Kings	76	24	42	10	185	260	−75	58
5	Pittsburgh Penguins	76	20	45	11	189	252	−63	51
6	Minnesota North Stars	76	18	43	15	189	270	−81	51

=== Record vs. opponents ===
==== Vs. West Division ====
1968–69 NHL records
Team	LAK	MIN	OAK	PHI	PIT	STL	Total
Los Angeles	—	1–4–3	4–2–2	3–4–1	5–2–1	1–6–1	14–18–8
Minnesota	4–1–3	—	3–4–1	2–3–3	3–5	2–4–2	14–17–9
Oakland	2–4–2	4–3–1	—	4–2–2	4–2–2	1–7	15–18–7
Philadelphia	4–3–1	3–2–3	2–4–2	—	4–1–3	1–6–1	14–16–10
Pittsburgh	2–5–1	5–3	2–4–2	1–4–3	—	3–4–1	13–20–7
St. Louis	6–1–1	4–2–2	7–1	6–1–1	4–3–1	—	27–8–5

==== Vs. East Division ====
1968–69 NHL records
Team	BOS	CHI	DET	MTL	NYR	TOR	Total
Los Angeles	1–5	1–5	2–4	0–4–2	3–3	3–3	10–24–2
Minnesota	0–4–2	0–5–1	2–4	0–5–1	1–5	1–3–2	4–26–6
Oakland	1–3–2	5–1	2–3–1	3–2–1	1–5	2–4	14–18–4
Philadelphia	2–4	0–3–3	1–3–2	1–5	1–3–2	1–1–4	6–19–11
Pittsburgh	1–5	2–4	2–4	1–4–1	1–5	0–3–3	7–25–4
St. Louis	2–2–2	2–3–1	4–0–2	0–5–1	1–3–2	1–4–1	10–17–9

== Playoffs ==
The Kings pulled off a first round upset, knocking off their in-state rivals the Oakland Seals in seven games in the NHL Quarter-finals. The Kings would then be swept by the St. Louis Blues in the West Division final. Bill Flett led all Kings playoff scorers with 7 points, while Eddie Joyal and Ted Irvine had 6 points each. Irvine had 5 goals to lead the club.

== Schedule and results ==
1968–69 regular season
October

Game	Date	Opponent	Score	Location	Record
1	12	St. Louis Blues	0–6	St. Louis	0–1–0
2	13	Oakland Seals	4–4	Oakland	0-1–1
3	17	Boston Bruins	2–1	Los Angeles	1–1-1
4	19	Minnesota North Stars	1–4	Minnesota	1–2–1
5	20	New York Rangers	0–7	New York	1–3–1
6	23	Montreal Canadiens	2–5	Los Angeles	1–4–1
7	26	Philadelphia Flyers	6–2	Los Angeles	2–4-1
8	30	Chicago Black Hawks	2–4	Los Angeles	2–5–1

November

Game	Date	Opponent	Score	Location	Record
9	2	Pittsburgh Penguins	3–2	Los Angeles	3–5-1
10	6	New York Rangers	2–0	Los Angeles	4–5-1
11	9	Toronto Maple Leafs	3–1	Los Angeles	5–5-1
12	12	Oakland Seals	3–1	Los Angeles	6–5-1
13	14	Detroit Red Wings	2–5	Los Angeles	6–6–1
14	16	Minnesota North Stars	2–3	Minnesota	6–7–1
15	17	Philadelphia Flyers	1–3	Philadelphia	6–8–1
16	20	New York Rangers	2–4	New York	6–9–1
17	21	Boston Bruins	1–4	Boston	6–10–1
18	23	Pittsburgh Penguins	2–2	Pittsburgh	6-10–2
19	24	Philadelphia Flyers	3–1	Philadelphia	7–10-2
20	27	Montreal Canadiens	2–4	Los Angeles	7–11–2
21	30	Pittsburgh Penguins	2–4	Los Angeles	7–12–2

December

Game	Date	Opponent	Score	Location	Record
22	4	Philadelphia Flyers	3–1	Los Angeles	8–12-2
23	7	Minnesota North Stars	3–2	Los Angeles	9–12-2
24	11	Detroit Red Wings	6–3	Los Angeles	10–12-2
25	14	Pittsburgh Penguins	2–1	Pittsburgh	11–12-2
26	15	St. Louis Blues	1–3	St. Louis	11–13–2
27	18	Montreal Canadiens	2–2	Montreal	11-13–3
28	19	Boston Bruins	4–6	Boston	11–14–3
29	21	Philadelphia Flyers	1–2	Los Angeles	11–15–3
30	26	Minnesota North Stars	4–4	Los Angeles	11-15–4
31	28	Toronto Maple Leafs	4–1	Toronto	12–15-4
32	29	Chicago Black Hawks	1–4	Chicago	12–16–4

January

Game	Date	Opponent	Score	Location	Record
33	1	St. Louis Blues	0–0	Los Angeles	12-16–5
34	5	Oakland Seals	0–0	Oakland	12-16–6
35	7	St. Louis Blues	0–5	St. Louis	12–17–6
36	9	Detroit Red Wings	2–6	Detroit	12–18–6
37	11	Toronto Maple Leafs	2–4	Toronto	12–19–6
38	12	Chicago Black Hawks	2–4	Chicago	12–20–6
39	14	New York Rangers	3–1	Los Angeles	13–20-6
40	16	Chicago Black Hawks	3–2	Los Angeles	14–20-6
41	18	Pittsburgh Penguins	4–0	Los Angeles	15–20-6
42	23	New York Rangers	1–3	New York	15–21–6
43	25	Minnesota North Stars	2–3	Minnesota	15–22–6
44	26	Chicago Black Hawks	3–9	Chicago	15–23–6
45	29	Toronto Maple Leafs	3–1	Los Angeles	16–23-6
46	30	Boston Bruins	5–7	Los Angeles	16–24–6

February

Game	Date	Opponent	Score	Location	Record
47	1	Oakland Seals	8–5	Los Angeles	17–24-6
48	4	St. Louis Blues	4–2	Los Angeles	18–24-6
49	6	Montreal Canadiens	2–4	Los Angeles	18–25–6
50	8	Pittsburgh Penguins	4–2	Pittsburgh	19–25-6
51	9	Detroit Red Wings	0–5	Detroit	19–26–6
52	11	Montreal Canadiens	3–7	Montreal	19–27–6
53	13	New York Rangers	4–1	Los Angeles	20–27-6
54	15	St. Louis Blues	1–4	St. Louis	20–28–6
55	16	Detroit Red Wings	3–6	Detroit	20–29–6
56	19	Minnesota North Stars	4–7	Minnesota	20–30–6
57	20	Chicago Black Hawks	2–6	Los Angeles	20–31–6
58	22	St. Louis Blues	1–3	Los Angeles	20–32–6
59	23	Oakland Seals	4–3	Oakland	21–32-6
60	24	Minnesota North Stars	1–1	Los Angeles	21-32–7
61	26	Boston Bruins	2–4	Los Angeles	21–33–7

March

Game	Date	Opponent	Score	Location	Record
62	1	Philadelphia Flyers	2–2	Los Angeles	21-33–8
63	5	Toronto Maple Leafs	4–6	Toronto	21–34–8
64	6	Philadelphia Flyers	1–5	Philadelphia	21–35–8
65	8	Montreal Canadiens	3–3	Montreal	21-35–9
66	9	Boston Bruins	2–7	Boston	21–36–9
67	12	Toronto Maple Leafs	0–4	Los Angeles	21–37–9
68	15	Pittsburgh Penguins	3–1	Los Angeles	22–37-9
69	18	Oakland Seals	3–2	Los Angeles	23–37-9
70	20	Detroit Red Wings	4–2	Los Angeles	24–37-9
71	22	Oakland Seals	0–4	Los Angeles	24–38–9
72	23	Oakland Seals	4–5	Oakland	24–39–9
73	26	Pittsburgh Penguins	4–8	Pittsburgh	24–40–9
74	27	Philadelphia Flyers	2–4	Philadelphia	24–41–9
75	29	St. Louis Blues	1–3	Los Angeles	24–42–9
76	30	Minnesota North Stars	3–3	Los Angeles	24-42–10

Legend: Win (2 points) Loss (0 points) Tie (1 point)

=== Playoffs ===
West Division Semifinal

Los Angeles Kings vs. Oakland Seals

Date	Away	Score	Home	Score	Notes
April 2	Los Angeles	5	Oakland	4	(OT)
April 3	Los Angeles	2	Oakland	4	
April 5	Oakland	5	Los Angeles	2	
April 6	Oakland	2	Los Angeles	4	
April 9	Los Angeles	1	Oakland	4	
April 10	Oakland	3	Los Angeles	4	
April 13	Los Angeles	5	Oakland	3	

Los Angeles wins best-of-seven series 4–3.

West Division Final

Los Angeles Kings vs. St. Louis Blues

Date	Away	Score	Home	Score	Notes
April 4	Los Angeles	0	St. Louis	4	
April 6	Los Angeles	2	St. Louis	3	
April 9	St. Louis	5	Los Angeles	2	
April 11	St. Louis	4	Los Angeles	1	

St. Louis wins best-of-seven series 4–0.

== Player statistics ==
=== Forwards ===
Note: GP = Games played; G = Goals; A = Assists; Pts = Points; PIM = Penalty minutes

Player	GP	G	A	Pts	PIM
Eddie Joyal	73	33	19	52	24
Bill Flett	72	24	25	49	53
Real Lemieux	75	11	29	40	68
Ted Irvine	76	15	24	39	47
Howie Hughes	73	16	14	30	10
Lowell MacDonald	58	14	14	38	10
Gord Labossiere	48	10	18	28	12
Howie Menard	56	10	17	27	31
Jimmy Peters	76	10	15	25	28
Phil "Skip" Krake	30	3	9	12	11
Doug Robinson	31	2	10	12	2
Ron Anderson	56	3	5	8	26
Gary Croteau	11	5	1	6	6
Bryan Campbell	18	2	1	3	4
Bill Inglis	10	0	1	1	0
Gerry Foley	1	0	0	0	0
Marc Dufour	2	0	0	0	0

=== Defensemen ===
Note: GP = Games played; G = Goals; A = Assists; Pts = Points; PIM = Penalty minutes

Player	GP	G	A	Pts	PIM
Bill White	75	5	28	33	38
Bob Wall	71	13	13	26	16
Dale Rolfe	75	3	19	22	85
Brent Hughes	72	2	19	21	73
Larry Cahan	72	3	11	14	76
Dave Amadio	65	1	5	6	60
Jacques Lemieux	0	0	0	0	0

=== Goaltending ===
Note: GP = Games played; MIN = Minutes; W = Wins; L = Losses; T = Ties; SO = Shutouts; GAA = Goals against average

Player	GP	MIN	W	L	T	SO	GAA
Gerry Desjardins	60	3499	18	34	6	4	3.26
Wayne Rutledge	17	921	6	7	4	0	3.65
Jacques Caron	3	140	0	1	0	0	3.86

== Transactions ==
The Kings were involved in the following transactions during the 1968–69 season.

=== Trades ===
May 20, 1968	To Los Angeles Kings Skip Krake	To Boston Bruins 1st round pick in 1970 – Reggie Leach
June 11, 1968	To Los Angeles Kings Gerry Desjardins	To Montreal Canadiens 1st round pick in 1969 – Dick Redmond; 1st round pick in 1972 – Steve Shutt
June 11, 1968	To Los Angeles Kings Myron Stankiewicz	To St. Louis Blues Terry Gray
July 1, 1968	To Los Angeles Kings Larry Cahan	To Montreal Canadiens Brian Smith; Yves Locas
September 30, 1968	To Los Angeles Kings Gary Croteau; Brian Murphy; Wayne Thomas	To Toronto Maple Leafs Grant Moore; Lou Deveault
October 10, 1968	To Los Angeles Kings Jimmy Peters Jr.	To Detroit Red Wings Terry Sawchuk
November 12, 1968	To Los Angeles Kings Ron Anderson	To Detroit Red Wings Poul Popiel

=== Reverse Draft ===
June 6, 1968	To Vancouver Canucks (WHL) Brian Kilrea
June 10, 1968	From Montreal Canadiens Noel Price

=== Intra-league Draft ===
June 12, 1968	To St. Louis Blues Myron Stankiewicz

== Draft picks ==
Round	Pick	Player	Nationality
1	7	Jim McInally	Canada

- NOTE: Back before 1979, the amateur draft was held with varying rules and procedures. In 1968, teams only needed to select as many player as they wanted to, which is why there was only one Kings player drafted.
