= 1968–69 Pittsburgh Penguins season =

NHL team season

1968–69 Pittsburgh Penguins
- Division: 5th West
- 1968–69 record: 20–45–11
- Home record: 12–20–6
- Road record: 8–25–5
- Goals for: 189
- Goals against: 248

Team information
- General manager: Jack Riley
- Coach: George "Red" Sullivan
- Captain: Vacant
- Alternate captains: Lou Angotti; Noel Price; Ken Schinkel; Bob Woytowich
- Arena: Pittsburgh Civic Arena
- Average attendance: 6,008

Team leaders
- Goals: Keith McCreary (25)
- Assists: Charlie Burns (38)
- Points: Ken Schinkel (52)
- Penalty minutes: Dunc McCallum (81)
- Wins: Les Binkley, Joe Daley (10)
- Goals against average: Marv Edwards (3.00)

The 1968–69 Pittsburgh Penguins season was the franchise's second season in the National Hockey League (NHL). The Penguins were unable to make the playoffs for the second straight year.

== Regular season ==
=== Final standings ===
West Division
		GP	W	L	T	GF	GA	DIFF	Pts
1	St. Louis Blues	76	37	25	14	204	157	+47	88
2	Oakland Seals	76	29	36	11	219	251	−32	69
3	Philadelphia Flyers	76	20	35	21	174	225	−51	61
4	Los Angeles Kings	76	24	42	10	185	260	−75	58
5	Pittsburgh Penguins	76	20	45	11	189	252	−63	51
6	Minnesota North Stars	76	18	43	15	189	270	−81	51

=== Record vs. opponents ===
==== Vs. West Division ====
1968–69 NHL records
Team	LAK	MIN	OAK	PHI	PIT	STL	Total
Los Angeles	—	1–4–3	4–2–2	3–4–1	5–2–1	1–6–1	14–18–8
Minnesota	4–1–3	—	3–4–1	2–3–3	3–5	2–4–2	14–17–9
Oakland	2–4–2	4–3–1	—	4–2–2	4–2–2	1–7	15–18–7
Philadelphia	4–3–1	3–2–3	2–4–2	—	4–1–3	1–6–1	14–16–10
Pittsburgh	2–5–1	5–3	2–4–2	1–4–3	—	3–4–1	13–20–7
St. Louis	6–1–1	4–2–2	7–1	6–1–1	4–3–1	—	27–8–5

==== Vs. East Division ====
1968–69 NHL records
Team	BOS	CHI	DET	MTL	NYR	TOR	Total
Los Angeles	1–5	1–5	2–4	0–4–2	3–3	3–3	10–24–2
Minnesota	0–4–2	0–5–1	2–4	0–5–1	1–5	1–3–2	4–26–6
Oakland	1–3–2	5–1	2–3–1	3–2–1	1–5	2–4	14–18–4
Philadelphia	2–4	0–3–3	1–3–2	1–5	1–3–2	1–1–4	6–19–11
Pittsburgh	1–5	2–4	2–4	1–4–1	1–5	0–3–3	7–25–4
St. Louis	2–2–2	2–3–1	4–0–2	0–5–1	1–3–2	1–4–1	10–17–9

== Schedule and results ==
1968–69 regular season
October: 1–4–2 (home: 1–2–1; road: 0–2–1), 4 points

#	Date	Visitor	Score	Home	Location (Attendance)	Record	Points
1	Oct 12	Montreal Canadiens	1–1	Pittsburgh Penguins	Montreal Forum (10,701)	0–0–1	1
2	Oct 16	Pittsburgh Penguins	2–2	Toronto Maple Leafs	Maple Leaf Gardens (16,321)	0–0–2	2
3	Oct 17	Pittsburgh Penguins	0–3	Philadelphia Flyers	The Spectrum (9,862)	0–1–2	2
4	Oct 19	Boston Bruins	5–1	Pittsburgh Penguins	Boston Garden (8,071)	0–2–2	2
5	Oct 23	Chicago Black Hawks	8–5	Pittsburgh Penguins	Chicago Stadium (5,889)	0–3–2	2
6	Oct 26	St. Louis Blues	2–4	Pittsburgh Penguins	St. Louis Arena (7,026)	1–3–2	4
7	Oct 30	Pittsburgh Penguins	3–7	New York Rangers	Madison Square Garden (IV) (13,111)	1–4–2	4

November: 4–8–2 (home: 1–4–2; road: 3–4–0), 10 points

#	Date	Visitor	Score	Home	Location (Attendance)	Record	Points
8	Nov 2	Pittsburgh Penguins	2–3	Los Angeles Kings	The Forum (6,602)	1–5–2	4
9	Nov 3	Pittsburgh Penguins	3–1	Oakland Seals	Oakland Coliseum Arena (2,166)	2–5–2	6
10	Nov 6	St. Louis Blues	3–1	Pittsburgh Penguins	St. Louis Arena (8,526)	2–6–2	6
11	Nov 7	Pittsburgh Penguins	4–5	Montreal Canadiens	Montreal Forum (16,704)	2–7–2	6
12	Nov 9	Philadelphia Flyers	3–0	Pittsburgh Penguins	The Spectrum (7,284)	2–8–2	6
13	Nov 13	Pittsburgh Penguins	5–6	Chicago Black Hawks	Chicago Stadium (16,666)	2–9–2	6
14	Nov 14	Chicago Black Hawks	6–4	Pittsburgh Penguins	Chicago Stadium (5,386)	2–10–2	6
15	Nov 16	New York Rangers	2–1	Pittsburgh Penguins	Madison Square Garden (IV) (7,062)	2–11–2	6
16	Nov 20	Pittsburgh Penguins	2–5	Toronto Maple Leafs	Maple Leaf Gardens (16,356)	2–12–2	6
17	Nov 21	Oakland Seals	1–3	Pittsburgh Penguins	Oakland Coliseum Arena (3,506)	3–12–2	8
18	Nov 23	Los Angeles Kings	2–2	Pittsburgh Penguins	The Forum (6,242)	3–12–3	9
19	Nov 27	Toronto Maple Leafs	3–3	Pittsburgh Penguins	Maple Leaf Gardens (7,107)	3–12–4	10
20	Nov 28	Pittsburgh Penguins	3–2	Chicago Black Hawks	Chicago Stadium (16,666)	4–12–4	12
21	Nov 30	Pittsburgh Penguins	4–2	Los Angeles Kings	The Forum (7,243)	5–12–4	14

December: 2–10–2 (home: 1–6–0; road: 1–4–2), 6 points

#	Date	Visitor	Score	Home	Location (Attendance)	Record	Points
22	Dec 1	Pittsburgh Penguins	4–4	Oakland Seals	Oakland Coliseum Arena (2,676)	5–12–5	15
23	Dec 4	Detroit Red Wings	7–2	Pittsburgh Penguins	Olympia Stadium (4,451)	5–13–5	15
24	Dec 7	Pittsburgh Penguins	1–1	St. Louis Blues	St. Louis Arena (15,057)	5–13–6	16
25	Dec 8	Toronto Maple Leafs	4–1	Pittsburgh Penguins	Maple Leaf Gardens (5,167)	5–14–6	16
26	Dec 11	Pittsburgh Penguins	4–2	Minnesota North Stars	Met Center (10,068)	6–14–6	18
27	Dec 14	Los Angeles Kings	2–1	Pittsburgh Penguins	The Forum (6,346)	6–15–6	18
28	Dec 15	Pittsburgh Penguins	3–5	Boston Bruins	Boston Garden (14,436)	6–16–6	18
29	Dec 17	Pittsburgh Penguins	2–8	Philadelphia Flyers	The Spectrum (6,986)	6–17–6	18
30	Dec 21	Minnesota North Stars	3–1	Pittsburgh Penguins	Met Center (5,307)	6–18–6	18
31	Dec 22	Pittsburgh Penguins	1–3	Chicago Black Hawks	Chicago Stadium (16,666)	6–19–6	18
32	Dec 25	Detroit Red Wings	3–6	Pittsburgh Penguins	Olympia Stadium (2,420)	7–19–6	20
33	Dec 26	Pittsburgh Penguins	2–3	St. Louis Blues	St. Louis Arena (15,056)	7–20–6	20
34	Dec 28	Oakland Seals	4–3	Pittsburgh Penguins	Oakland Coliseum Arena (8,196)	7–21–6	20
35	Dec 31	Montreal Canadiens	4–3	Pittsburgh Penguins	Montreal Forum (3,979)	7–22–6	20

January: 3–10–1 (home: 1–4–1; road: 2–6–0), 7 points

#	Date	Visitor	Score	Home	Location (Attendance)	Record	Points
36	Jan 2	Pittsburgh Penguins	5–2	Montreal Canadiens	Montreal Forum (16,104)	8–22–6	22
37	Jan 4	Philadelphia Flyers	1–1	Pittsburgh Penguins	The Spectrum (6,329)	8–22–7	23
38	Jan 5	Pittsburgh Penguins	1–2	Detroit Red Wings	Olympia Stadium (10,973)	8–23–7	23
39	Jan 9	Minnesota North Stars	2–7	Pittsburgh Penguins	Met Center (4,017)	9–23–7	25
40	Jan 11	Oakland Seals	4–2	Pittsburgh Penguins	Oakland Coliseum Arena (7,101)	9–24–7	25
41	Jan 12	Pittsburgh Penguins	4–8	Boston Bruins	Boston Garden (14,659)	9–25–7	25
42	Jan 15	Pittsburgh Penguins	3–1	Minnesota North Stars	Met Center (10,355)	10–25–7	27
43	Jan 16	Pittsburgh Penguins	2–3	Detroit Red Wings	Olympia Stadium (10,623)	10–26–7	27
44	Jan 18	Pittsburgh Penguins	0–4	Los Angeles Kings	The Forum (9,172)	10–27–7	27
45	Jan 19	Pittsburgh Penguins	3–6	Oakland Seals	Oakland Coliseum Arena (3,436)	10–28–7	27
46	Jan 23	Minnesota North Stars	3–1	Pittsburgh Penguins	Met Center (3,806)	10–29–7	27
47	Jan 25	Toronto Maple Leafs	2–0	Pittsburgh Penguins	Maple Leaf Gardens (10,109)	10–30–7	27
48	Jan 26	Pittsburgh Penguins	3–5	Philadelphia Flyers	The Spectrum (10,987)	10–31–7	27
49	Jan 29	St. Louis Blues	2–1	Pittsburgh Penguins	St. Louis Arena (3,185)	10–32–7	27

February: 4–6–2 (home: 4–2–2; road: 0–4–0), 10 points

#	Date	Visitor	Score	Home	Location (Attendance)	Record	Points
50	Feb 1	Philadelphia Flyers	2–2	Pittsburgh Penguins	The Spectrum (5,866)	10–32–8	28
51	Feb 2	Pittsburgh Penguins	3–7	New York Rangers	Madison Square Garden (IV) (17,250)	10–33–8	28
52	Feb 5	New York Rangers	2–3	Pittsburgh Penguins	Madison Square Garden (IV) (4,024)	11–33–8	30
53	Feb 8	Los Angeles Kings	4–2	Pittsburgh Penguins	The Forum (5,933)	11–34–8	30
54	Feb 9	Pittsburgh Penguins	1–3	Minnesota North Stars	Met Center (12,342)	11–35–8	30
55	Feb 12	Pittsburgh Penguins	0–2	St. Louis Blues	St. Louis Arena (13,235)	11–36–8	30
56	Feb 15	Oakland Seals	4–4	Pittsburgh Penguins	Oakland Coliseum Arena (5,277)	11–36–9	31
57	Feb 16	Montreal Canadiens	4–0	Pittsburgh Penguins	Montreal Forum (5,882)	11–37–9	31
58	Feb 19	Boston Bruins	0–3	Pittsburgh Penguins	Boston Garden (3,189)	12–37–9	33
59	Feb 20	Pittsburgh Penguins	0–3	Detroit Red Wings	Olympia Stadium (12,331)	12–38–9	33
60	Feb 22	Detroit Red Wings	2–3	Pittsburgh Penguins	Olympia Stadium (8,785)	13–38–9	35
61	Feb 27	Chicago Black Hawks	3–4	Pittsburgh Penguins	Chicago Stadium (6,271)	14–38–9	37

March: 6–7–2 (home: 4–2–0; road: 2–5–2), 14 points

#	Date	Visitor	Score	Home	Location (Attendance)	Record	Points
62	Mar 1	Pittsburgh Penguins	3–3	Toronto Maple Leafs	Maple Leaf Gardens (16,485)	14–38–10	38
63	Mar 2	Pittsburgh Penguins	0–4	Boston Bruins	Boston Garden (14,659)	14–39–10	38
64	Mar 5	St. Louis Blues	2–4	Pittsburgh Penguins	St. Louis Arena (4,310)	15–39–10	40
65	Mar 8	New York Rangers	5–3	Pittsburgh Penguins	Madison Square Garden (IV) (10,016)	15–40–10	40
66	Mar 12	Pittsburgh Penguins	3–4	New York Rangers	Madison Square Garden (IV) (17,250)	15–41–10	40
67	Mar 15	Pittsburgh Penguins	1–3	Los Angeles Kings	The Forum (8,218)	15–42–10	40
68	Mar 16	Pittsburgh Penguins	2–7	Oakland Seals	Oakland Coliseum Arena (3,608)	15–43–10	40
69	Mar 19	Boston Bruins	3–2	Pittsburgh Penguins	Boston Garden (3,942)	15–44–10	40
70	Mar 20	Pittsburgh Penguins	3–5	Montreal Canadiens	Montreal Forum (16,827)	15–45–10	40
71	Mar 22	Pittsburgh Penguins	2–1	St. Louis Blues	St. Louis Arena (15,157)	16–45–10	42
72	Mar 23	Minnesota North Stars	0–5	Pittsburgh Penguins	Met Center (3,739)	17–45–10	44
73	Mar 25	Pittsburgh Penguins	3–1	Minnesota North Stars	Met Center (11,572)	18–45–10	46
74	Mar 26	Los Angeles Kings	4–8	Pittsburgh Penguins	The Forum (8,156)	19–45–10	48
75	Mar 29	Pittsburgh Penguins	3–3	Philadelphia Flyers	The Spectrum (11,039)	19–45–11	49
76	Mar 30	Philadelphia Flyers	1–2	Pittsburgh Penguins	The Spectrum (5,783)	20–45–11	51

Legend: Win (2 points) Loss (0 points) Tie (1 point)

== Player statistics ==
Skaters

Regular season
Player	GP	G	A	Pts	+/−	PIM
Ken Schinkel	76	18	34	52	-39	18
Charlie Burns	76	13	38	51	-8	22
Keith McCreary	70	25	23	48	-19	42
Jean Pronovost	76	16	25	41	-2	41
Lou Angotti	71	17	20	37	-22	36
Val Fonteyne	74	12	17	29	-25	2
Wally Boyer	62	10	19	29	-20	17
Bob Woytowich	71	9	20	29	-27	64
Gene Ubriaco^{‡}	49	15	11	26	-1	14
Earl Ingarfield^{‡}	40	8	15	23	-17	4
Billy Harris^{†}	55	7	13	20	-19	8
Noel Price	73	2	18	20	-29	61
Billy Dea	66	10	8	18	-33	6
Leo Boivin^{‡}	41	5	13	18	-6	26
Dunc McCallum	62	5	13	18	-35	81
Paul Andrea	25	7	6	13	-10	2
Duane Rupp^{†}	30	3	10	13	-10	24
George Swarbrick^{†}	19	1	6	7	-5	28
Bill Speer	34	1	4	5	-17	27
Tracy Pratt	18	0	5	5	-3	34
Ron Snell	4	3	1	4	4	6
Bryan Watson^{†}	18	0	4	4	-12	35
Doug Barrie	8	1	1	2	0	8
Garry Swain	9	1	1	2	-1	0
John Arbour	17	0	2	2	-14	35
Dick Mattiussi^{‡}	12	0	2	2	-2	14
Jean-Guy Lagace	17	0	1	1	-8	14
Bob Dillabough	14	0	0	0	-6	2
Bill Lecaine	4	0	0	0	0	0
Total		189	330	519	—	671

Goaltenders

Regular Season
Player	GP	GS	TOI	W	L	OT	T	GA	GAA	SA	SV%	SO	G	A	PIM
Joe Daley	29	27	1611:59	10	13	--	3	86	3.20	956	0.910	2	0	0	2
Les Binkley	50	48	2878:34	10	31	--	8	158	3.29	1609	0.902	0	0	0	0
Marv Edwards	1	1	60:00	0	1	--	0	3	3.00	33	0.909	0	0	0	0
Total		76	4550:33	20	45	0	11	247	3.26	2598	0.905	2	0	0	2

^{†}Denotes player spent time with another team before joining the Penguins. Stats reflect time with the Penguins only.
^{‡}Denotes player was traded mid-season. Stats reflect time with the Penguins only.

== Awards and records ==
- Leo Boivin became the first to play 100 games for the Penguins during a 1–2 loss to Los Angeles on December 14. He played 100 of Pittsburgh's first 101 games.
- Ken Schinkel established a new franchise record for lowest plus-minus with –39. He topped the previous record of –23 held by Val Fonteyne.
- Jean Pronovost established a rookie record for the Penguins in terms of assists (25) and points (41).
- Bob Woytowich tied Leo Boivin's team record for goals in a season by a defenseman with 9.

== Transactions ==
The Penguins were involved in the following transactions during the 1968–69 season:

=== Trades ===
July 4, 1968	To Oakland Seals George Konik	To Pittsburgh Penguins cash
September 1, 1968	To Philadelphia Flyers loan of Bob Rivard	To Pittsburgh Penguins cash
October 1, 1968	To Minnesota North Stars 1972 1st round pick (Dave Gardiner)	To Pittsburgh Penguins Bob Woytowich
October 1, 1968	To Detroit Red Wings cash	To Pittsburgh Penguins Doug Barrie
November 22, 1968	To Montreal Canadiens Larry Hillman	To Pittsburgh Penguins Jean-Guy Lagace cash
November 29, 1968	To Oakland Seals Bob Dillabough	To Pittsburgh Penguins Billy Harris
January 24, 1969	To Minnesota North Stars Leo Boivin	To Pittsburgh Penguins Duane Rupp
January 30, 1969	To Oakland Seals Earl Ingarfield Sr. Dick Mattiussi; Gene Ubriaco	To Pittsburgh Penguins Tracy Pratt; George Swarbrick; Bryan Watson
May 30, 1969	To Toronto Maple Leafs cash	To Pittsburgh Penguins Forbes Kennedy
June 6, 1969	To St. Louis Blues Lou Angotti; 1971 1st round pick (Gene Carr)	To Pittsburgh Penguins Craig Cameron; Ron Schock; 1972 2nd round pick (Bernie Lukowicz)

=== Additions and subtractions ===
Additions
Player	Former team	Via
Charlie Burns	Oakland Seals	Intra-league draft (1968–06–12)
Larry Hillman	Minnesota North Stars	waivers (1968–11–22)

Subtractions
Player	New team	Via

== Draft picks ==
Round	#	Player	Pos	Nationality	College/Junior/Club team (League)
1	4	Garry Swain	Center	Canada	Niagara Falls Flyers (OHA)
2	14	Ron Snell	Right wing	Canada	Regina Pats (WCHL)
3	21	Dave Simpson	Defense	Canada	Port Arthur Marrs (TBJHL)
