= 1968–69 St. Louis Blues season =

National Hockey League team season

1968–69 St. Louis Blues
- West Division champions
- Division: 1st West
- 1968–69 record: 37–25–14
- Home record: 21–8–9
- Road record: 16–17–5
- Goals for: 204
- Goals against: 157

Team information
- General manager: Scotty Bowman
- Coach: Scotty Bowman
- Captain: Al Arbour
- Alternate captains: Jim Roberts; Jean-Guy Talbot; Red Berenson
- Arena: St. Louis Arena

Team leaders
- Goals: Red Berenson (35)
- Assists: Red Berenson (47)
- Points: Red Berenson (82)
- Penalty minutes: Noel Picard (131)
- Wins: Glenn Hall (19)
- Goals against average: Jacques Plante (1.96)

The 1968–69 St. Louis Blues season was the second in the history of the franchise. The Blues won the NHL's West Division title for the first time in their history. In the playoffs, the Blues swept the Philadelphia Flyers and the Los Angeles Kings, winning both series four games to none, before losing the Stanley Cup Finals in four straight to the Montreal Canadiens for the second straight season.

== Regular season ==
On November 7, 1968, Red Berenson scored six goals in a road game versus the Philadelphia Flyers. He became the first player to score a double hat trick on a road game. Goaltenders Glenn Hall and Jacques Plante shared the Vezina Trophy as the NHL's top goalie tandem for that season, and set the Blues' record (broken in 2011–12) of 13 shutouts. For Hall, it was his third Vezina, while Plante, who had come out of retirement during the summer of 1968, took home his seventh. It was the second major award that an NHL expansion team has earned. Hall also earned the Conn Smythe Trophy as the NHL Playoffs MVP the previous season.

=== Final standings ===
West Division
		GP	W	L	T	GF	GA	DIFF	Pts
1	St. Louis Blues	76	37	25	14	204	157	+47	88
2	Oakland Seals	76	29	36	11	219	251	−32	69
3	Philadelphia Flyers	76	20	35	21	174	225	−51	61
4	Los Angeles Kings	76	24	42	10	185	260	−75	58
5	Pittsburgh Penguins	76	20	45	11	189	252	−63	51
6	Minnesota North Stars	76	18	43	15	189	270	−81	51

=== Record vs. opponents ===
==== Vs. West Division ====
1968–69 NHL records
Team	LAK	MIN	OAK	PHI	PIT	STL	Total
Los Angeles	—	1–4–3	4–2–2	3–4–1	5–2–1	1–6–1	14–18–8
Minnesota	4–1–3	—	3–4–1	2–3–3	3–5	2–4–2	14–17–9
Oakland	2–4–2	4–3–1	—	4–2–2	4–2–2	1–7	15–18–7
Philadelphia	4–3–1	3–2–3	2–4–2	—	4–1–3	1–6–1	14–16–10
Pittsburgh	2–5–1	5–3	2–4–2	1–4–3	—	3–4–1	13–20–7
St. Louis	6–1–1	4–2–2	7–1	6–1–1	4–3–1	—	27–8–5

==== Vs. East Division ====
1968–69 NHL records
Team	BOS	CHI	DET	MTL	NYR	TOR	Total
Los Angeles	1–5	1–5	2–4	0–4–2	3–3	3–3	10–24–2
Minnesota	0–4–2	0–5–1	2–4	0–5–1	1–5	1–3–2	4–26–6
Oakland	1–3–2	5–1	2–3–1	3–2–1	1–5	2–4	14–18–4
Philadelphia	2–4	0–3–3	1–3–2	1–5	1–3–2	1–1–4	6–19–11
Pittsburgh	1–5	2–4	2–4	1–4–1	1–5	0–3–3	7–25–4
St. Louis	2–2–2	2–3–1	4–0–2	0–5–1	1–3–2	1–4–1	10–17–9

== Schedule and results ==
1968–69 regular season
October

Game	Result	Date	Score	Opponent	Record
1	L	October 11, 1968	3–4	@ Chicago Black Hawks (1968–69)	0–1–0
2	W	October 12, 1968	6–0	Los Angeles Kings (1968–69)	1–1–0
3	L	October 16, 1968	2–4	Montreal Canadiens (1968–69)	1–2–0
4	W	October 19, 1968	4–1	Oakland Seals (1968–69)	2–2–0
5	L	October 23, 1968	4–6	@ Toronto Maple Leafs (1968–69)	2–3–0
6	W	October 24, 1968	2–1	@ Boston Bruins (1968–69)	3–3–0
7	L	October 26, 1968	2–4	@ Pittsburgh Penguins (1968–69)	3–4–0
8	W	October 30, 1968	4–1	Philadelphia Flyers (1968–69)	4–4–0

November

Game	Result	Date	Score	Opponent	Record
9	L	November 2, 1968	0–2	Minnesota North Stars (1968–69)	4–5–0
10	T	November 3, 1968	4–4	@ Detroit Red Wings (1968–69)	4–5–1
11	W	November 6, 1968	3–1	@ Pittsburgh Penguins (1968–69)	5–5–1
12	W	November 7, 1968	8–0	@ Philadelphia Flyers (1968–69)	6–5–1
13	L	November 9, 1968	1–4	@ Montreal Canadiens (1968–69)	6–6–1
14	T	November 10, 1968	1–1	@ Boston Bruins (1968–69)	6–6–2
15	W	November 13, 1968	3–1	@ New York Rangers (1968–69)	7–6–2
16	T	November 16, 1968	1–1	Detroit Red Wings (1968–69)	7–6–3
17	T	November 17, 1968	3–3	Minnesota North Stars (1968–69)	7–6–4
18	W	November 20, 1968	7–0	Oakland Seals (1968–69)	8–6–4
19	W	November 23, 1968	1–0	Chicago Black Hawks (1968–69)	9–6–4
20	T	November 27, 1968	4–4	Boston Bruins (1968–69)	9–6–5
21	W	November 28, 1968	3–1	@ Detroit Red Wings (1968–69)	10–6–5
22	W	November 30, 1968	1–0	Philadelphia Flyers (1968–69)	11–6–5

December

Game	Result	Date	Score	Opponent	Record
23	T	December 4, 1968	3–3	Chicago Black Hawks (1968–69)	11–6–6
24	T	December 7, 1968	1–1	Pittsburgh Penguins (1968–69)	11–6–7
25	T	December 8, 1968	4–4	@ Philadelphia Flyers (1968–69)	11–6–8
26	L	December 11, 1968	3–6	@ Chicago Black Hawks (1968–69)	11–7–8
27	L	December 12, 1968	4–5	@ Montreal Canadiens (1968–69)	11–8–8
28	L	December 14, 1968	2–3	@ Toronto Maple Leafs (1968–69)	11–9–8
29	W	December 15, 1968	3–1	Los Angeles Kings (1968–69)	12–9–8
30	W	December 20, 1968	1–0	@ Oakland Seals (1968–69)	13–9–8
31	T	December 21, 1968	2–2	New York Rangers (1968–69)	13–9–9
32	W	December 25, 1968	2–0	@ Minnesota North Stars (1968–69)	14–9–9
33	W	December 26, 1968	3–2	Pittsburgh Penguins (1968–69)	15–9–9
34	L	December 28, 1968	2–6	Boston Bruins (1968–69)	15–10–9

January

Game	Result	Date	Score	Opponent	Record
35	T	January 1, 1969	0–0	@ Los Angeles Kings (1968–69)	15–10–10
36	W	January 3, 1969	3–1	@ Oakland Seals (1968–69)	16–10–10
37	W	January 4, 1969	3–1	Detroit Red Wings (1968–69)	17–10–10
38	W	January 7, 1969	5–0	Los Angeles Kings (1968–69)	18–10–10
39	L	January 8, 1969	1–3	@ Chicago Black Hawks (1968–69)	18–11–10
40	W	January 11, 1969	6–1	Chicago Black Hawks (1968–69)	19–11–10
41	W	January 12, 1969	2–0	@ Minnesota North Stars (1968–69)	20–11–10
42	W	January 15, 1969	4–3	Philadelphia Flyers (1968–69)	21–11–10
43	T	January 18, 1969	2–2	New York Rangers (1968–69)	21–11–11
44	W	January 19, 1969	3–1	@ Minnesota North Stars (1968–69)	22–11–11
45	L	January 23, 1969	2–3	Toronto Maple Leafs (1968–69)	22–12–11
46	L	January 25, 1969	0–4	@ Boston Bruins (1968–69)	22–13–11
47	W	January 26, 1969	3–1	Oakland Seals (1968–69)	23–13–11
48	W	January 29, 1969	2–1	@ Pittsburgh Penguins (1968–69)	24–13–11
49	L	January 30, 1969	3–4	New York Rangers (1968–69)	24–14–11

February

Game	Result	Date	Score	Opponent	Record
50	W	February 1, 1969	2–0	@ Detroit Red Wings (1968–69)	25–14–11
51	W	February 2, 1969	5–3	Toronto Maple Leafs (1968–69)	26–14–11
52	L	February 4, 1969	2–4	@ Los Angeles Kings (1968–69)	26–15–11
53	W	February 6, 1969	3–1	Boston Bruins (1968–69)	27–15–11
54	L	February 8, 1969	0–2	@ New York Rangers (1968–69)	27–16–11
55	T	February 9, 1969	4–4	Montreal Canadiens (1968–69)	27–16–12
56	W	February 12, 1969	2–0	Pittsburgh Penguins (1968–69)	28–16–12
57	W	February 13, 1969	2–1	@ Philadelphia Flyers (1968–69)	29–16–12
58	W	February 15, 1969	4–1	Los Angeles Kings (1968–69)	30–16–12
59	W	February 16, 1969	6–0	Minnesota North Stars (1968–69)	31–16–12
60	W	February 19, 1969	3–1	Philadelphia Flyers (1968–69)	32–16–12
61	L	February 21, 1969	2–3	@ Oakland Seals (1968–69)	32–17–12
62	W	February 22, 1969	3–1	@ Los Angeles Kings (1968–69)	33–17–12
63	L	February 26, 1969	2–3	@ Toronto Maple Leafs (1968–69)	33–18–12

March

Game	Result	Date	Score	Opponent	Record
64	L	March 1, 1969	0–3	@ Montreal Canadiens (1968–69)	33–19–12
65	L	March 2, 1969	1–2	@ New York Rangers (1968–69)	33–20–12
66	L	March 5, 1969	2–4	@ Pittsburgh Penguins (1968–69)	33–21–12
67	W	March 8, 1969	5–2	Oakland Seals (1968–69)	34–21–12
68	T	March 9, 1969	2–2	@ Minnesota North Stars (1968–69)	34–21–13
69	L	March 11, 1969	0–3	Montreal Canadiens (1968–69)	34–22–13
70	W	March 15, 1969	3–2	Detroit Red Wings (1968–69)	35–22–13
71	L	March 16, 1969	2–3	Minnesota North Stars (1968–69)	35–23–13
72	T	March 19, 1969	1–1	Toronto Maple Leafs (1968–69)	35–23–14
73	L	March 22, 1969	1–2	Pittsburgh Penguins (1968–69)	35–24–14
74	L	March 23, 1969	3–4	@ Philadelphia Flyers (1968–69)	35–25–14
75	W	March 26, 1969	5–3	@ Oakland Seals (1968–69)	36–25–14
76	W	March 29, 1969	3–1	@ Los Angeles Kings (1968–69)	37–25–14

Legend: Win (2 points) Loss (0 points) Tie (1 point)

== Playoffs ==
=== Stanley Cup Finals ===
Claude Ruel became the eleventh rookie coach to win the Stanley Cup. Montreal goaltender Rogie Vachon limited St. Louis to three goals in four games and his first career playoff shutout.

Montreal Canadiens vs. St. Louis Blues

Date	Visitors	Score	Home	Score	Notes
April 27	St. Louis	1	Montreal	3	
April 29	St. Louis	1	Montreal	3	
May 1	Montreal	4	St. Louis	0	
May 4	Montreal	2	St. Louis	1	

Montreal wins the series 4–0.

== Player statistics ==
=== Regular season ===
Scoring

Player	Pos	GP	G	A	Pts	PIM	PPG	SHG	GWG
Red Berenson	C	76	35	47	82	43	7	1	6
Gary Sabourin	RW	75	25	23	48	58	3	0	3
Ab McDonald	LW	68	21	21	42	12	2	0	4
Camille Henry	C	64	17	22	39	8	7	0	1
Ron Schock	C	67	12	27	39	14	4	0	3
Frank St. Marseille	RW	72	12	26	38	22	3	0	3
Tim Ecclestone	LW	68	11	23	34	31	1	0	4
Jim Roberts	D/RW	72	14	19	33	81	2	1	1
Bill McCreary	LW	71	13	17	30	50	3	1	4
Barclay Plager	D	61	4	26	30	120	0	0	1
Noel Picard	D	67	5	19	24	131	0	0	1
Doug Harvey	D	70	2	20	22	30	1	0	0
Craig Cameron	RW	72	11	5	16	40	2	0	1
Terry Crisp	C	57	6	9	15	14	1	1	0
Larry Keenan	LW	46	5	9	14	6	0	0	2
Jean-Guy Talbot	D	69	5	4	9	24	0	0	1
Al Arbour	D	67	1	6	7	50	0	0	1
Bob Plager	D	32	0	7	7	43	0	0	0
Terry Gray	RW	8	4	0	4	4	2	0	1
Glenn Hall	G	41	0	2	2	20	0	0	0
Myron Stankiewicz	LW	16	0	2	2	11	0	0	0
Ray Fortin	D	11	1	0	1	6	0	0	0
Norm Dennis	C	2	0	0	0	2	0	0	0
Gary Edwards	G	1	0	0	0	0	0	0	0
Robbie Irons	G	1	0	0	0	0	0	0	0
Ted Ouimet	G	1	0	0	0	0	0	0	0
Bill Plager	D	2	0	0	0	2	0	0	0
Jacques Plante	G	37	0	0	0	2	0	0	0

Goaltending

Player	MIN	GP	W	L	T	GA	GAA	SO
Glenn Hall	2354	41	19	12	8	85	2.17	8
Jacques Plante	2139	37	18	12	6	70	1.96	5
Gary Edwards	4	1	0	0	0	0	0.00	0
Robbie Irons	3	1	0	0	0	0	0.00	0
Ted Ouimet	60	1	0	1	0	2	2.00	0
Team:	4560	76	37	25	14	157	2.07	13

=== Playoffs ===
Scoring

Player	Pos	GP	G	A	Pts	PIM	PPG	SHG	GWG
Gary Sabourin	RW	12	6	5	11	12	1	0	2
Red Berenson	C	12	7	3	10	20	2	0	1
Larry Keenan	LW	12	4	5	9	8	1	0	2
Terry Crisp	C	12	3	4	7	20	0	0	2
Camille Henry	C	11	2	5	7	0	1	0	0
Frank St. Marseille	RW	12	3	3	6	2	0	0	0
Bill McCreary	LW	12	1	5	6	14	1	0	1
Terry Gray	RW	11	3	2	5	8	1	0	0
Noel Picard	D	12	1	4	5	30	0	0	0
Jim Roberts	D/RW	12	1	4	5	10	0	0	0
Tim Ecclestone	LW	12	2	2	4	20	0	0	0
Barclay Plager	D	12	0	4	4	31	0	0	0
Bob Plager	D	9	0	4	4	47	0	0	0
Ab McDonald	LW	12	2	1	3	10	0	0	0
Ron Schock	C	12	1	2	3	6	0	0	0
Jean-Guy Talbot	D	12	0	2	2	6	0	0	0
Jacques Plante	G	10	0	1	1	0	0	0	0
Al Arbour	D	12	0	0	0	10	0	0	0
Craig Cameron	RW	2	0	0	0	0	0	0	0
Glenn Hall	G	3	0	0	0	0	0	0	0
Bill Plager	D	4	0	0	0	4	0	0	0

Goaltending

Player	MIN	GP	W	L	GA	GAA	SO
Jacques Plante	589	10	8	2	14	1.43	3
Glenn Hall	131	3	0	2	5	2.29	0
Team:	720	12	8	4	19	1.58	3

Note:

Pos = Position;GP = Games played; G = Goals; A = Assists; Pts = Points; PIM = Penalty minutes; +/- = Plus/minus; PPG = Power-play goals; SHG = Short-handed goals; GWG = Game-winning goals
Pos = Position;GP = Games played; Min, TOI = Minutes played; W = Wins; L = Losses; T,T/OT = Ties; OTL = Overtime losses; GA = Goals-against; GAA = Goals-against average; SO = Shutouts; SA = Shots against; SV = Shots saved;SV% = Save percentage;

== Awards and records ==
- Red Berenson, most goals in one road game (6), achieved on November 7, 1968, vs. Philadelphia

== Draft picks ==
St. Louis's picks at the 1968 NHL entry draft.

Round	Pick	Player	Position	Nationality	College
1	6	Gary Edwards	Goaltender	Canada	Toronto Marlboros (OHA)
2	16	Curt Bennett	Left wing	United States	Brown Bears (NCAA)
