= 1968–69 Oakland Seals season =

NHL season

1968–69 Oakland Seals
- Division: 2nd West
- 1968–69 record: 29–36–11
- Home record: 17–14–7
- Road record: 12–22–4
- Goals for: 219
- Goals against: 251

Team information
- General manager: Frank Selke Jr.
- Coach: Fred Glover
- Captain: Ted Hampson
- Alternate captains: Bill Hicke; Bert Marshall; Gerry Odrowski
- Arena: Oakland Coliseum Arena
- Average attendance: 4,584

Team leaders
- Goals: Norm Ferguson (34)
- Assists: Ted Hampson (49)
- Points: Ted Hampson (75)
- Penalty minutes: Carol Vadnais (151)
- Plus/minus: Gerry Odrowski (+4)
- Wins: Gary Smith (21)
- Goals against average: Gary Smith (2.96)

The 1968–69 Oakland Seals season was the Seals' second season in the National Hockey League (NHL). For the first time in their history they qualified for the Stanley Cup playoffs after finishing second in the West Division, with a record of 29–36–11. They were upset in the playoffs, losing their quarter-finals series to the fourth-place Los Angeles Kings in seven games (Oakland's three playoff game victories against Los Angeles were the only ones the franchise would get in their entire ten-year history).

== Off-season ==
Frank Selke Jr. was named general manager of the team, replacing Bert Olmstead. Selke hired Fred Glover as coach. Rumors persisted over the off-season that the team would be sold to brothers Northrup and Seymour Knox III and moved to Buffalo.

=== Amateur draft ===
Round	Pick	Player	Nationality	College/junior/club team
2	13.	Doug Smith (C)	Canada	Winnipeg Jets (WCJHL)
3	20.	Jim Trewin (D)	Canada	Flin Flon Bombers (WCJHL)

== Regular season ==
Early in 1969 the Knox brothers did buy a 20% stake in the team; the remaining 80% was purchased by Trans-National Communications, a holding company based in New York City. The sale was $4.5 million: $1.6 million for Seals outright; $1.9 million in debt; the remaining expansion fee due to the NHL; a $680,000 loan to Labatt Brewery; an undisclosed sum to Hockey Investors Inc. (their role in the sale was not disclosed); and settlements to Rudy Pilous, Bert Olmstead, and Gord Fashoway.

The Seals finished the season with a record of 26 wins, 36 losses, and 11 ties, second in the West Division. Attendance averaged 4,584 per game.

Norm Ferguson scored 34 goals, tying him with Danny Grant for the most by an NHL rookie (set by Nels Stewart in 1925–26). Ferguson finished second to Grant in voting for the Calder Memorial Trophy as rookie-of-the-year. Ted Hampson won the Bill Masterton Memorial Trophy for "exemplifies the qualities of perseverance, sportsmanship, and dedication to hockey". This would be the only major NHL trophy a Seal player would win. Hampson also finished second overall in voting for the Lady Byng Memorial Trophy for sportsmanship.

=== Final standings ===
West Division
		GP	W	L	T	GF	GA	DIFF	Pts
1	St. Louis Blues	76	37	25	14	204	157	+47	88
2	Oakland Seals	76	29	36	11	219	251	−32	69
3	Philadelphia Flyers	76	20	35	21	174	225	−51	61
4	Los Angeles Kings	76	24	42	10	185	260	−75	58
5	Pittsburgh Penguins	76	20	45	11	189	252	−63	51
6	Minnesota North Stars	76	18	43	15	189	270	−81	51

=== Record vs. opponents ===
==== Vs. West Division ====
1968–69 NHL records
Team	LAK	MIN	OAK	PHI	PIT	STL	Total
Los Angeles	—	1–4–3	4–2–2	3–4–1	5–2–1	1–6–1	14–18–8
Minnesota	4–1–3	—	3–4–1	2–3–3	3–5	2–4–2	14–17–9
Oakland	2–4–2	4–3–1	—	4–2–2	4–2–2	1–7	15–18–7
Philadelphia	4–3–1	3–2–3	2–4–2	—	4–1–3	1–6–1	14–16–10
Pittsburgh	2–5–1	5–3	2–4–2	1–4–3	—	3–4–1	13–20–7
St. Louis	6–1–1	4–2–2	7–1	6–1–1	4–3–1	—	27–8–5

==== Vs. East Division ====
1968–69 NHL records
Team	BOS	CHI	DET	MTL	NYR	TOR	Total
Los Angeles	1–5	1–5	2–4	0–4–2	3–3	3–3	10–24–2
Minnesota	0–4–2	0–5–1	2–4	0–5–1	1–5	1–3–2	4–26–6
Oakland	1–3–2	5–1	2–3–1	3–2–1	1–5	2–4	14–18–4
Philadelphia	2–4	0–3–3	1–3–2	1–5	1–3–2	1–1–4	6–19–11
Pittsburgh	1–5	2–4	2–4	1–4–1	1–5	0–3–3	7–25–4
St. Louis	2–2–2	2–3–1	4–0–2	0–5–1	1–3–2	1–4–1	10–17–9

== Playoffs ==
The Seals made it into the playoffs and went against Los Angeles in the Quarter-finals in a best of seven series and lost in 7 games, or 3–4.

== Schedule and results ==
=== Regular season ===
1968–69 regular season
October

Game	Date	Score	Opponent	Record	Recap
1	October 11, 1968	1–5	Minnesota North Stars (1968–69)	0–1–0	L
2	October 13, 1968	4–4	Los Angeles Kings (1968–69)	0–1–1	T
3	October 16, 1968	1–2	Boston Bruins (1968–69)	0–2–1	L
4	October 19, 1968	1–4	@ St. Louis Blues (1968–69)	0–3–1	L
5	October 20, 1968	4–3	@ Chicago Black Hawks (1968–69)	1–3–1	W
6	October 22, 1968	3–2	@ Minnesota North Stars (1968–69)	2–3–1	W
7	October 23, 1968	1–6	@ New York Rangers (1968–69)	2–4–1	L
8	October 25, 1968	2–4	Montreal Canadiens (1968–69)	2–5–1	L
9	October 27, 1968	2–2	Philadelphia Flyers (1968–69)	2–5–2	T

November

Game	Date	Score	Opponent	Record	Recap
10	November 1, 1968	5–2	Chicago Black Hawks (1968–69)	3–5–2	W
11	November 3, 1968	1–3	Pittsburgh Penguins (1968–69)	3–6–2	L
12	November 8, 1968	2–3	New York Rangers^{1} (1968–69)	3–7–2	L
13	November 10, 1968	1–3	Toronto Maple Leafs (1968–69)	3–8–2	L
14	November 12, 1968	1–3	@ Los Angeles Kings (1968–69)	3–9–2	L
15	November 13, 1968	2–1	Detroit Red Wings (1968–69)	4–9–2	W
16	November 16, 1968	3–3	@ Montreal Canadiens (1968–69)	4–9–3	T
17	November 17, 1968	3–6	@ Boston Bruins (1968–69)	4–10–3	L
18	November 20, 1968	0–7	@ St. Louis Blues (1968–69)	4–11–3	L
19	November 21, 1968	1–3	@ Pittsburgh Penguins (1968–69)	4–12–3	L
20	November 23, 1968	2–1	@ Philadelphia Flyers (1968–69)	5–12–3	W
21	November 24, 1968	2–3	@ New York Rangers (1968–69)	5–13–3	L
22	November 27, 1968	3–3	@ Minnesota North Stars (1968–69)	5–13–4	T
23	November 29, 1968	5–4	Montreal Canadiens (1968–69)	6–13–4	W

December

Game	Date	Score	Opponent	Record	Recap
24	December 1, 1968	4–4	Pittsburgh Penguins (1968–69)	6–13–5	T
25	December 6, 1968	4–0	Philadelphia Flyers (1968–69)	7–13–5	W
26	December 8, 1968	1–4	Minnesota North Stars^{1} (1968–69)	7–14–5	L
27	December 12, 1968	6–0	Detroit Red Wings (1968–69)	8–14–5	W
28	December 14, 1968	1–3	@ Detroit Red Wings (1968–69)	8–15–5	L
29	December 15, 1968	4–7	@ Chicago Black Hawks (1968–69)	8–16–5	L
30	December 17, 1968	3–2	@ Minnesota North Stars (1968–69)	9–16–5	W
31	December 18, 1968	2–5	@ Toronto Maple Leafs (1968–69)	9–17–5	L
32	December 20, 1968	0–1	St. Louis Blues (1968–69)	9–18–5	L
33	December 22, 1968	2–1	Philadelphia Flyers^{1} (1968–69)	10–18–5	W
34	December 25, 1968	3–1	@ Boston Bruins (1968–69)	11–18–5	W
35	December 26, 1968	1–3	@ New York Rangers (1968–69)	11–19–5	L
36	December 28, 1968	4–3	@ Pittsburgh Penguins (1968–69)	12–19–5	W
37	December 29, 1968	2–1	@ Philadelphia Flyers (1968–69)	13–19–5	W

January

Game	Date	Score	Opponent	Record	Recap
38	January 1, 1969	3–7	@ Toronto Maple Leafs (1968–69)	13–20–5	L
39	January 3, 1969	1–3	St. Louis Blues (1968–69)	13–21–5	L
40	January 5, 1969	0–0	Los Angeles Kings (1968–69)	13–21–6	T
41	January 9, 1969	4–8	@ Montreal Canadiens (1968–69)	13–22–6	L
42	January 11, 1969	4–2	@ Pittsburgh Penguins (1968–69)	14–22–6	W
43	January 12, 1969	1–5	@ Detroit Red Wings (1968–69)	14–23–6	L
44	January 15, 1969	4–3	Chicago Black Hawks (1968–69)	15–23–6	W
45	January 17, 1969	1–3	New York Rangers (1968–69)	15–24–6	L
46	January 19, 1969	6–3	Pittsburgh Penguins (1968–69)	16–24–6	W
47	January 23, 1969	5–3	@ Montreal Canadiens (1968–69)	17–24–6	W
48	January 25, 1969	3–5	@ Detroit Red Wings (1968–69)	17–25–6	L
49	January 26, 1969	1–3	@ St. Louis Blues (1968–69)	17–26–6	L
50	January 29, 1969	3–3	Boston Bruins (1968–69)	17–26–7	T
51	January 31, 1969	5–4	Toronto Maple Leafs (1968–69)	18–26–7	W

February

Game	Date	Score	Opponent	Record	Recap
52	February 1, 1969	5–8	@ Los Angeles Kings (1968–69)	18–27–7	L
53	February 5, 1969	5–1	Montreal Canadiens (1968–69)	19–27–7	W
54	February 8, 1969	4–1	@ Toronto Maple Leafs (1968–69)	20–27–7	W
55	February 9, 1969	3–3	@ Boston Bruins (1968–69)	20–27–8	T
56	February 12, 1969	3–2	New York Rangers (1968–69)	21–27–8	W
57	February 15, 1969	4–4	@ Pittsburgh Penguins (1968–69)	21–27–9	T
58	February 16, 1969	2–3	@ Philadelphia Flyers (1968–69)	21–28–9	L
59	February 19, 1969	5–2	Chicago Black Hawks (1968–69)	22–28–9	W
60	February 21, 1969	3–2	St. Louis Blues^{1} (1968–69)	23–28–9	W
61	February 23, 1969	3–4	Los Angeles Kings (1968–69)	23–29–9	L
62	February 26, 1969	6–5	Minnesota North Stars^{1} (1968–69)	24–29–9	W
63	February 27, 1969	0–9	Boston Bruins (1968–69)	24–30–9	L

March

Game	Date	Score	Opponent	Record	Recap
64	March 2, 1969	4–4	Philadelphia Flyers (1968–69)	24–30–10	T
65	March 5, 1969	2–5	@ Minnesota North Stars (1968–69)	24–31–10	L
66	March 8, 1969	2–5	@ St. Louis Blues (1968–69)	24–32–10	L
67	March 9, 1969	3–5	@ Philadelphia Flyers (1968–69)	24–33–10	L
68	March 12, 1969	4–1	@ Chicago Black Hawks (1968–69)	25–33–10	W
69	March 13, 1969	1–3	Toronto Maple Leafs (1968–69)	25–34–10	L
70	March 16, 1969	7–2	Pittsburgh Penguins (1968–69)	26–34–10	W
71	March 18, 1969	2–3	@ Los Angeles Kings (1968–69)	26–35–10	L
72	March 19, 1969	4–4	Detroit Red Wings (1968–69)	26–35–11	T
73	March 22, 1969	4–0	@ Los Angeles Kings (1968–69)	27–35–11	W
74	March 23, 1969	5–4	Los Angeles Kings (1968–69)	28–35–11	W
75	March 26, 1969	3–5	St. Louis Blues (1968–69)	28–36–11	L
76	March 29, 1969	7–2	Minnesota North Stars (1968–69)	29–36–11	W

Legend: W Win (2 points) L Loss (0 points) T Tie (1 point)
Notes: ^1Game played at Cow Palace in Daly City.

=== Playoffs ===
1969 Stanley Cup playoffs
Quarterfinals vs. (W4) Los Angeles Kings – Kings win 4–3

Game	Date	Score	Opponent	Series	Recap
1	April 2, 1969	4–5 OT	Los Angeles Kings	Kings lead 1–0	L
2	April 3, 1969	4–2	Los Angeles Kings	Series tied 1–1	W
3	April 5, 1969	5–2	@ Los Angeles Kings	Seals lead 2–1	W
4	April 6, 1969	2–4	@ Los Angeles Kings	Series tied 2–2	L
5	April 9, 1969	4–1	Los Angeles Kings	Seals lead 3–2	W
6	April 10, 1969	3–4	@ Los Angeles Kings	Series tied 3–3	L
7	April 13, 1969	3–5	Los Angeles Kings	Kings win 4–3	L

Legend: W Win L Loss

== Player statistics ==
=== Skaters ===
Note: GP = Games played; G = Goals; A = Assists; Pts = Points; PIM = Penalties in minutes

		Regular season					Playoffs
Player	#	GP	G	A	Pts	PIM	GP	G	A	Pts	PIM
Ted Hampson	10	76	26	49	75	6	7	3	4	7	2
Bill Hicke	9	67	25	36	61	68	7	0	3	3	4
Norm Ferguson	17	76	34	20	54	31	7	1	4	5	7
Gary Jarrett	12	63	22	23	45	22	7	2	1	3	4
Gerry Ehman	8	70	21	24	45	12	7	2	2	4	0
Mike Laughton	15	53	20	23	43	22	7	3	2	5	0
Carol Vadnais	5	76	15	27	42	151	7	1	4	5	10
Brian Perry	20	61	10	21	31	10	6	1	1	2	4
Earl Ingarfield†	7	26	8	15	23	8	7	4	6	10	2
Joe Szura	18	70	9	12	21	20	7	2	3	5	2
Doug Roberts	2	76	1	19	20	79	7	0	1	1	34
Bob Dillabough†	21	48	7	12	19	4	7	3	0	3	0
Bert Marshall	19	68	3	15	18	81	7	0	7	7	20
Francois Lacombe	4	72	2	16	18	50	3	1	0	1	0
George Swarbrick‡	14	50	3	13	16	75	–	–	–	–	–
Gene Ubriaco†	16	26	4	7	11	14	7	2	0	2	2
Dick Mattiussi†	6	24	1	9	10	16	7	0	1	1	6
Gerry Odrowski	11	74	5	1	6	24	7	0	1	1	2
Bryan Watson‡	6	50	2	3	5	97	–	–	–	–	–
Billy Harris‡	7	19	0	4	4	2	–	–	–	–	–
John Brenneman	16	21	1	2	3	6	7	0	0	0	0
Gary Smith	30	54	0	2	2	7	7	0	0	0	0
Len Ronson	15	5	0	0	0	0	–	–	–	–	–
Charlie Hodge	1	14	0	0	0	0	–	–	–	–	–
Chris Worthy	25	14	0	0	0	0	–	–	–	–	–

†Denotes player spent time with another team before joining Seals. Stats reflect time with the Seals only. ‡Traded mid-season

=== Goaltenders ===
Note: GP = Games played; TOI = Time on ice (minutes); W = Wins; L = Losses; T = Ties; GA = Goals against; SO = Shutouts; GAA = Goals against average

		Regular season								Playoffs
Player	#	GP	TOI	W	L	T	GA	SO	GAA	GP	TOI	W	L	GA	SO	GAA
Gary Smith	30	54	2993	21	24	7	148	4	2.96	7	420	3	4	23	0	3.29
Charlie Hodge	1	14	781	4	6	1	48	0	3.69	–	–	–	–	–	–	–
Chris Worthy	25	14	786	4	6	3	54	0	4.12	–	–	–	–	–	–	–

== Transactions ==
The Seals were involved in the following transactions during the 1968–69 season:

=== Trades ===
May 14, 1968	To Oakland Seals cash	To Toronto Maple Leafs Terry Clancy
May 21, 1968	To Oakland Seals Norm Ferguson; Stan Fuller; François Lacombe; Michel Jacques	To Montreal Canadiens Wally Boyer; Alain Caron rights to Lyle Bradley
May 27, 1968	To Oakland Seals Gary Jarrett; Doug Roberts; Chris Worthy; Howie Young	To Detroit Red Wings Bobby Baun; Ron Harris
June 6, 1968	To Oakland Seals Bryan Watson cash	To Montreal Canadiens 1st round pick in 1972 (Michel Larocque)
August, 1968	To Oakland Seals Len Ronson	To Montreal Canadiens cash
September 13, 1968	To Oakland Seals cash	To New York Rangers Ron Boehm
November, 1968	To Oakland Seals cash	To San Diego Gulls (WHL) Len Ronson
November 29, 1968	To Oakland Seals Bob Dillabough	To Pittsburgh Penguins Billy Harris
January 30, 1969	To Oakland Seals Earl Ingarfield; Dick Mattiussi; Gene Ubriaco	To Pittsburgh Penguins Tracy Pratt; George Swarbrick; Bryan Watson

=== Additions and subtractions ===
Additions
Player	Former team	Via
Brian Perry	Providence Reds (AHL)	Inter-league Draft (1968–06–06)
Carol Vadnais	Montreal Canadiens	Intra-league Draft (1968–06–12)

Subtractions
Player	New team	Via
Charlie Burns	Pittsburgh Penguins	Intra-league Draft (1968–06–12)
Larry Cahan	Montreal Canadiens	Intra-league Draft (1968–06–12)
Howie Young	Chicago Black Hawks	Waivers (1968–10–02)
