= 1968–69 Boston Bruins season =

NHL team season

1968–69 Boston Bruins
- Division: 2nd East
- 1968–69 record: 42–18–16
- Home record: 29–3–6
- Road record: 13–15–10
- Goals for: 303
- Goals against: 221

Team information
- General manager: Milt Schmidt
- Coach: Harry Sinden
- Captain: Vacant
- Alternate captains: Johnny Bucyk; Phil Esposito; Ted Green; Ed Westfall
- Arena: Boston Garden

Team leaders
- Goals: Phil Esposito (49)
- Assists: Phil Esposito (77)
- Points: Phil Esposito (126)
- Penalty minutes: Don Awrey (149)
- Wins: Gerry Cheevers (28)
- Goals against average: Gerry Cheevers (2.80)

The 1968–69 Boston Bruins season was the Bruins' 45th season in the NHL.

== Regular season ==
The Bruins set several league records for scoring, both team and individual. Phil Esposito broke league records for points and assists, becoming the first player in NHL history to exceed 100 points, with 126 and 77 respectively. With linemates Ken Hodge and Ron Murphy, he shared in a new record for most points by a forward line with 263. Bobby Orr set new league records for goals and points by a defenseman with 21 and 64. The team as a whole scored the most goals in history with 303, and were awarded the most penalty minutes with 1297.

=== Season standings ===
East Division
		GP	W	L	T	GF	GA	DIFF	Pts
1	Montreal Canadiens	76	46	19	11	271	202	+69	103
2	Boston Bruins	76	42	18	16	303	221	+82	100
3	New York Rangers	76	41	26	9	231	196	+35	91
4	Toronto Maple Leafs	76	35	26	15	234	217	+17	85
5	Detroit Red Wings	76	33	31	12	239	221	+18	78
6	Chicago Black Hawks	76	34	33	9	280	246	+34	77

=== Record vs. opponents ===
==== Vs. East Division ====
1968–69 NHL records
Team	BOS	CHI	DET	MTL	NYR	TOR	Total
Boston	—	5–2–1	3–2–3	4–2–2	3–3–2	4–2–2	19–11–10
Chicago	2–5–1	—	3–4–1	1–7	4–3–1	3–4–1	13–23–4
Detroit	2–3–3	4–3–1	—	2–5–1	4–3–1	3–4–1	15–18–7
Montreal	2–4–2	7–1	5–2–1	—	3–4–1	4–3–1	21–14–5
New York	3–3–2	3–4–1	3–4–1	4–3–1	—	4–4	17–18–5
Toronto	2–4–2	4–3–1	4–3–1	3–4–1	4–4	—	17–18–5

==== Vs. West Division ====
1968–69 NHL records
Team	LAK	MIN	OAK	PHI	PIT	STL	Total
Boston	5–1	4–0–2	3–1–2	4–2	5–1	2–2–2	23–7–6
Chicago	5–1	5–0–1	1–5	3–0–3	4–2	3–2–1	21–10–5
Detroit	4–2	4–2	3–2–1	3–1–2	4–2	0–4–2	18–13–5
Montreal	4–0–2	5–0–1	2–3–1	5–1	4–1–1	5–0–1	25–5–6
New York	3–3	5–1	5–1	3–1–2	5–1	3–1–2	24–8–4
Toronto	3–3	3–1–2	4–2	1–1–4	3–0–3	4–1–1	18–8–10

== Schedule and results ==
1968–69 regular season
October

Game	Result	Date	Score	Opponent	Record
1	W	October 11, 1968	4–2	Detroit Red Wings (1968–69)	1–0–0
2	W	October 13, 1968	3–2	Philadelphia Flyers (1968–69)	2–0–0
3	W	October 16, 1968	2–1	@ Oakland Seals (1968–69)	3–0–0
4	L	October 17, 1968	1–2	@ Los Angeles Kings (1968–69)	3–1–0
5	W	October 19, 1968	5–1	@ Pittsburgh Penguins (1968–69)	4–1–0
6	L	October 24, 1968	1–2	St. Louis Blues (1968–69)	4–2–0
7	L	October 26, 1968	0–2	@ Toronto Maple Leafs (1968–69)	4–3–0
8	W	October 27, 1968	4–2	Montreal Canadiens (1968–69)	5–3–0
9	W	October 30, 1968	4–2	@ Minnesota North Stars (1968–69)	6–3–0
10	L	October 31, 1968	5–7	@ Detroit Red Wings (1968–69)	6–4–0

November

Game	Result	Date	Score	Opponent	Record
11	W	November 3, 1968	5–3	Chicago Black Hawks (1968–69)	7–4–0
12	W	November 6, 1968	7–1	Philadelphia Flyers (1968–69)	8–4–0
13	T	November 10, 1968	1–1	St. Louis Blues (1968–69)	8–4–1
14	T	November 13, 1968	1–1	@ Toronto Maple Leafs (1968–69)	8–4–2
15	L	November 14, 1968	2–4	@ Philadelphia Flyers (1968–69)	8–5–2
16	W	November 17, 1968	6–3	Oakland Seals (1968–69)	9–5–2
17	W	November 21, 1968	4–1	Los Angeles Kings (1968–69)	10–5–2
18	W	November 23, 1968	5–1	New York Rangers (1968–69)	11–5–2
19	W	November 24, 1968	7–4	Toronto Maple Leafs (1968–69)	12–5–2
20	T	November 27, 1968	4–4	@ St. Louis Blues (1968–69)	12–5–3
21	L	November 30, 1968	1–4	New York Rangers (1968–69)	12–6–3

December

Game	Result	Date	Score	Opponent	Record
22	W	December 1, 1968	4–0	Minnesota North Stars (1968–69)	13–6–3
23	T	December 5, 1968	2–2	Montreal Canadiens (1968–69)	13–6–4
24	W	December 7, 1968	4–1	Detroit Red Wings (1968–69)	14–6–4
25	L	December 8, 1968	4–7	@ Chicago Black Hawks (1968–69)	14–7–4
26	T	December 11, 1968	2–2	@ New York Rangers (1968–69)	14–7–5
27	W	December 14, 1968	10–5	Chicago Black Hawks (1968–69)	15–7–5
28	W	December 15, 1968	5–3	Pittsburgh Penguins (1968–69)	16–7–5
29	W	December 19, 1968	6–4	Los Angeles Kings (1968–69)	17–7–5
30	T	December 21, 1968	0–0	@ Montreal Canadiens (1968–69)	17–7–6
31	W	December 22, 1968	7–5	Montreal Canadiens (1968–69)	18–7–6
32	L	December 25, 1968	1–3	Oakland Seals (1968–69)	18–8–6
33	W	December 28, 1968	6–2	@ St. Louis Blues (1968–69)	19–8–6
34	T	December 29, 1968	3–3	@ Detroit Red Wings (1968–69)	19–8–7

January

Game	Result	Date	Score	Opponent	Record
35	W	January 2, 1969	4–2	@ New York Rangers (1968–69)	20–8–7
36	T	January 4, 1969	2–2	@ Minnesota North Stars (1968–69)	20–8–8
37	W	January 9, 1969	3–2	Toronto Maple Leafs (1968–69)	21–8–8
38	W	January 11, 1969	6–3	@ Montreal Canadiens (1968–69)	22–8–8
39	W	January 12, 1969	8–4	Pittsburgh Penguins (1968–69)	23–8–8
40	T	January 15, 1969	5–5	@ Toronto Maple Leafs (1968–69)	23–8–9
41	W	January 16, 1969	5–1	Minnesota North Stars (1968–69)	24–8–9
42	W	January 18, 1969	5–3	@ Philadelphia Flyers (1968–69)	25–8–9
43	W	January 19, 1969	5–3	Toronto Maple Leafs (1968–69)	26–8–9
44	T	January 23, 1969	2–2	@ Detroit Red Wings (1968–69)	26–8–10
45	W	January 25, 1969	4–0	St. Louis Blues (1968–69)	27–8–10
46	W	January 26, 1969	4–3	Minnesota North Stars (1968–69)	28–8–10
47	T	January 29, 1969	3–3	@ Oakland Seals (1968–69)	28–8–11
48	W	January 30, 1969	7–5	@ Los Angeles Kings (1968–69)	29–8–11

February

Game	Result	Date	Score	Opponent	Record
49	W	February 2, 1969	4–2	Detroit Red Wings (1968–69)	30–8–11
50	W	February 5, 1969	7–2	@ Chicago Black Hawks (1968–69)	31–8–11
51	L	February 6, 1969	1–3	@ St. Louis Blues (1968–69)	31–9–11
52	W	February 8, 1969	6–5	Philadelphia Flyers (1968–69)	32–9–11
53	T	February 9, 1969	3–3	Oakland Seals (1968–69)	32–9–12
54	W	February 11, 1969	7–3	Chicago Black Hawks (1968–69)	33–9–12
55	L	February 15, 1969	1–3	@ Montreal Canadiens (1968–69)	33–10–12
56	L	February 16, 1969	1–5	@ Chicago Black Hawks (1968–69)	33–11–12
57	L	February 19, 1969	0–3	@ Pittsburgh Penguins (1968–69)	33–12–12
58	L	February 23, 1969	0–9	@ New York Rangers (1968–69)	33–13–12
59	W	February 26, 1969	4–2	@ Los Angeles Kings (1968–69)	34–13–12
60	W	February 27, 1969	9–0	@ Oakland Seals (1968–69)	35–13–12

March

Game	Result	Date	Score	Opponent	Record
61	W	March 1, 1969	8–5	New York Rangers (1968–69)	36–13–12
62	W	March 2, 1969	4–0	Pittsburgh Penguins (1968–69)	37–13–12
63	T	March 5, 1969	2–2	Detroit Red Wings (1968–69)	37–13–13
64	L	March 8, 1969	4–7	@ Detroit Red Wings (1968–69)	37–14–13
65	W	March 9, 1969	7–2	Los Angeles Kings (1968–69)	38–14–13
66	T	March 11, 1969	3–3	@ Minnesota North Stars (1968–69)	38–14–14
67	L	March 13, 1969	1–2	@ Philadelphia Flyers (1968–69)	38–15–14
68	L	March 15, 1969	4–7	@ Toronto Maple Leafs (1968–69)	38–16–14
69	W	March 16, 1969	11–3	Toronto Maple Leafs (1968–69)	39–16–14
70	W	March 19, 1969	3–2	@ Pittsburgh Penguins (1968–69)	40–16–14
71	T	March 20, 1969	5–5	Chicago Black Hawks (1968–69)	40–16–15
72	W	March 22, 1969	5–3	@ Chicago Black Hawks (1968–69)	41–16–15
73	L	March 23, 1969	2–4	@ New York Rangers (1968–69)	41–17–15
74	T	March 27, 1969	3–3	New York Rangers (1968–69)	41–17–16
75	L	March 29, 1969	3–5	@ Montreal Canadiens (1968–69)	41–18–16
76	W	March 30, 1969	6–3	Montreal Canadiens (1968–69)	42–18–16

Legend: Win (2 points) Loss (0 points) Tie (1 point)

== Playoffs ==
1969 Stanley Cup playoffs
Quarterfinals vs. (E4) Toronto Maple Leafs – Bruins win 4–0

Game	Result	Date	Score	Opponent	Series
1	W	April 2, 1969	10–0	Toronto Maple Leafs	Bruins lead 1–0
2	W	April 3, 1969	7–0	Toronto Maple Leafs	Bruins lead 2–0
3	W	April 5, 1969	4–3	@ Toronto Maple Leafs	Bruins lead 3–0
4	W	April 6, 1969	3–2	@ Toronto Maple Leafs	Bruins win 4–0

Semifinals vs. (E1) Montreal Canadiens – Canadiens win 4–2

Game	Result	Date	Score	Opponent	Series
1	L	April 10, 1969	2–3	@ Montreal Canadiens	Canadiens lead 1–0
2	L	April 13, 1969	3–4	@ Montreal Canadiens	Canadiens lead 2–0
3	W	April 17, 1969	5–0	Montreal Canadiens	Canadiens lead 2–1
4	W	April 20, 1969	3–2	Montreal Canadiens	Series tied 2–2
5	L	April 22, 1969	2–4	@ Montreal Canadiens	Canadiens lead 3–2
6	L	April 24, 1969	1–2	Montreal Canadiens	Canadiens win 4–2

Legend: Win Loss

== Player statistics ==
=== Regular season ===
Scoring

Player	Pos	GP	G	A	Pts	PIM	PPG	SHG	GWG
Phil Esposito	C	74	49	77	126	79	10	2	9
Ken Hodge	RW	75	45	45	90	75	9	1	7
John Bucyk	LW	70	24	42	66	18	11	0	3
Bobby Orr	D	67	21	43	64	133	4	0	2
John McKenzie	RW	60	29	27	56	99	8	1	7
Fred Stanfield	LW	71	25	29	54	22	6	0	1
Ron Murphy	LW	60	16	38	54	26	5	0	0
Derek Sanderson	C	61	26	22	48	146	1	3	3
Ted Green	D	65	8	38	46	99	3	0	0
Ed Westfall	D/RW	70	18	24	42	22	1	4	4
Wayne Cashman	LW	51	8	23	31	49	1	0	1
Dallas Smith	D	75	4	24	28	74	0	1	0
Eddie Shack	LW	50	11	11	22	74	1	0	3
Glen Sather	LW	76	4	11	15	67	0	1	1
Don Awrey	D	73	0	13	13	149	0	0	0
Tommy Williams	RW	26	4	7	11	19	0	0	0
Garnet Bailey	LW	8	3	3	6	10	0	0	0
Gary Doak	D	22	3	3	6	37	0	0	0
Rick Smith	D	48	0	5	5	29	0	0	0
Jim Lorentz	C/RW	11	1	3	4	6	0	0	1
Jim Harrison	C	16	1	2	3	21	0	0	0
Jean Gauthier	D	11	0	2	2	8	0	0	0
Tom Webster	RW	9	0	2	2	9	0	0	0
Grant Erickson	LW	2	1	0	1	0	0	0	0
Don Marcotte	LW	7	1	0	1	2	0	0	0
Barry Wilkins	D	1	1	0	1	0	0	0	0
Paul Hurley	D	1	0	1	1	0	0	0	0
Eddie Johnston	G	24	0	1	1	0	0	0	0
Bill Lesuk	LW	5	0	1	1	0	0	0	0
Steve Atkinson	RW	1	0	0	0	0	0	0	0
Gerry Cheevers	G	52	0	0	0	14	0	0	0
Barry Gibbs	D	8	0	0	0	2	0	0	0
Joe Junkin	G	1	0	0	0	0	0	0	0
Bobby Leiter	C	1	0	0	0	0	0	0	0
Ross Lonsberry	LW	6	0	0	0	2	0	0	0

Goaltending

Player	MIN	GP	W	L	T	GA	GAA	SO
Gerry Cheevers	3112	52	28	12	12	145	2.80	3
Eddie Johnston	1440	24	14	6	4	74	3.08	2
Joe Junkin	8	1	0	0	0	0	0.00	0
Team:	4560	76	42	18	16	219	2.88	5

=== Playoffs ===
Scoring

Player	Pos	GP	G	A	Pts	PIM	PPG	SHG	GWG
Phil Esposito	C	10	8	10	18	8	5	0	2
Ken Hodge	RW	10	5	7	12	4	2	0	0
John Bucyk	LW	10	5	6	11	0	2	0	1
Derek Sanderson	C	9	8	2	10	36	0	3	2
Ed Westfall	D/RW	10	3	7	10	11	0	2	0
Ted Green	D	10	2	7	9	18	0	0	0
Ron Murphy	LW	10	4	4	8	12	0	0	0
Bobby Orr	D	10	1	7	8	10	0	0	1
John McKenzie	RW	10	2	2	4	17	1	0	0
Fred Stanfield	LW	10	2	2	4	0	1	0	0
Dallas Smith	D	10	0	3	3	16	0	0	0
Eddie Shack	LW	9	0	2	2	23	0	0	0
Don Awrey	D	10	0	1	1	28	0	0	0
Wayne Cashman	LW	6	0	1	1	0	0	0	0
Garnet Bailey	LW	1	0	0	0	2	0	0	0
Gerry Cheevers	G	9	0	0	0	17	0	0	0
Eddie Johnston	G	1	0	0	0	0	0	0	0
Bill Lesuk	LW	1	0	0	0	0	0	0	0
Glen Sather	LW	10	0	0	0	18	0	0	0
Rick Smith	D	9	0	0	0	6	0	0	0
Tom Webster	RW	1	0	0	0	0	0	0	0

Goaltending

Player	MIN	GP	W	L	GA	GAA	SO
Gerry Cheevers	572	9	6	3	16	1.68	3
Eddie Johnston	65	1	0	1	4	3.69	0
Team:	637	10	6	4	20	1.88	3

Note:

Pos = Position;GP = Games played; G = Goals; A = Assists; Pts = Points; PIM = Penalty minutes; +/- = Plus/minus; PPG = Power-play goals; SHG = Short-handed goals; GWG = Game-winning goals
Pos = Position;GP = Games played; Min, TOI = Minutes played; W = Wins; L = Losses; T,T/OT = Ties; OTL = Overtime losses; GA = Goals-against; GAA = Goals-against average; SO = Shutouts; SA = Shots against; SV = Shots saved;SV% = Save percentage;

== Awards and records ==
- Phil Esposito, Art Ross Trophy
- Phil Esposito, Hart Memorial Trophy
- Phil Esposito, NHL First Team All-Star
- Ted Green, NHL Second Team All-Star
- Bobby Orr, James Norris Memorial Trophy
- Bobby Orr, NHL Plus/Minus Award
- Bobby Orr, NHL First Team All-Star

== Draft picks ==
=== NHL draft ===
Round	Overall	Player	Nationality	Position
1	12	Danny Schock	Canada	Left wing
2	18	Fraser Rice	Canada	Center
3	24	Brian St. John	Canada	Center

== See also ==
- 1968–69 NHL season
