= 1968–69 Toronto Maple Leafs season =

NHL hockey team season

1968–69 Toronto Maple Leafs
- Division: 4th East
- 1968–69 record: 35–26–15
- Home record: 20–8–10
- Road record: 15–18–5
- Goals for: 271
- Goals against: 202

Team information
- General manager: Punch Imlach
- Coach: Punch Imlach
- Captain: George Armstrong
- Alternate captains: Tim Horton; Dave Keon; Bob Pulford
- Arena: Maple Leaf Gardens

Team leaders
- Goals: Norm Ullman (35)
- Assists: Norm Ullman (42)
- Points: Norm Ullman (77)
- Penalty minutes: Jim Dorey (200)
- Wins: Bruce Gamble (28)
- Goals against average: Bruce Gamble (2.80)

The 1968–69 Toronto Maple Leafs season was the Toronto Maple Leafs 52nd season of the franchise, 42nd season as the Maple Leafs. Although the Maple Leafs returned to the playoffs after missing the prior year, they were swept in the quarter-finals by Boston, suffering two crushing defeats at Boston Garden.

== Offseason ==
=== NHL draft ===
Round	Pick	Player	Position	Nationality	Club team
1	10	Brad Selwood	Defence	Canada	Niagara Falls Flyers (OHA)

== Regular season ==
=== Season standings ===
East Division
		GP	W	L	T	GF	GA	DIFF	Pts
1	Montreal Canadiens	76	46	19	11	271	202	+69	103
2	Boston Bruins	76	42	18	16	303	221	+82	100
3	New York Rangers	76	41	26	9	231	196	+35	91
4	Toronto Maple Leafs	76	35	26	15	234	217	+17	85
5	Detroit Red Wings	76	33	31	12	239	221	+18	78
6	Chicago Black Hawks	76	34	33	9	280	246	+34	77

=== Record vs. opponents ===
==== Vs. East Division ====
1968–69 NHL records
Team	BOS	CHI	DET	MTL	NYR	TOR	Total
Boston	—	5–2–1	3–2–3	4–2–2	3–3–2	4–2–2	19–11–10
Chicago	2–5–1	—	3–4–1	1–7	4–3–1	3–4–1	13–23–4
Detroit	2–3–3	4–3–1	—	2–5–1	4–3–1	3–4–1	15–18–7
Montreal	2–4–2	7–1	5–2–1	—	3–4–1	4–3–1	21–14–5
New York	3–3–2	3–4–1	3–4–1	4–3–1	—	4–4	17–18–5
Toronto	2–4–2	4–3–1	4–3–1	3–4–1	4–4	—	17–18–5

==== Vs. West Division ====
1968–69 NHL records
Team	LAK	MIN	OAK	PHI	PIT	STL	Total
Boston	5–1	4–0–2	3–1–2	4–2	5–1	2–2–2	23–7–6
Chicago	5–1	5–0–1	1–5	3–0–3	4–2	3–2–1	21–10–5
Detroit	4–2	4–2	3–2–1	3–1–2	4–2	0–4–2	18–13–5
Montreal	4–0–2	5–0–1	2–3–1	5–1	4–1–1	5–0–1	25–5–6
New York	3–3	5–1	5–1	3–1–2	5–1	3–1–2	24–8–4
Toronto	3–3	3–1–2	4–2	1–1–4	3–0–3	4–1–1	18–8–10

== Schedule and results ==
1968–69 regular season
October

Game	Result	Date	Score	Opponent	Record
1	W	October 13, 1968	2–1	@ Detroit Red Wings (1968–69)	1–0–0
2	T	October 16, 1968	2–2	Pittsburgh Penguins (1968–69)	1–0–1
3	L	October 19, 1968	1–3	Chicago Black Hawks (1968–69)	1–1–1
4	W	October 23, 1968	6–4	St. Louis Blues (1968–69)	2–1–1
5	W	October 26, 1968	2–0	Boston Bruins (1968–69)	3–1–1
6	W	October 27, 1968	5–3	@ New York Rangers (1968–69)	4–1–1
7	L	October 30, 1968	0–5	Montreal Canadiens (1968–69)	4–2–1

November

Game	Result	Date	Score	Opponent	Record
8	L	November 2, 1968	2–3	Philadelphia Flyers (1968–69)	4–3–1
9	W	November 6, 1968	1–0	@ Minnesota North Stars (1968–69)	5–3–1
10	L	November 9, 1968	1–3	@ Los Angeles Kings (1968–69)	5–4–1
11	W	November 10, 1968	3–1	@ Oakland Seals (1968–69)	6–4–1
12	T	November 13, 1968	1–1	Boston Bruins (1968–69)	6–4–2
13	W	November 14, 1968	5–3	@ Montreal Canadiens (1968–69)	7–4–2
14	W	November 16, 1968	3–1	Chicago Black Hawks (1968–69)	8–4–2
15	T	November 17, 1968	1–1	@ Chicago Black Hawks (1968–69)	8–4–3
16	W	November 20, 1968	5–2	Pittsburgh Penguins (1968–69)	9–4–3
17	L	November 23, 1968	2–5	Detroit Red Wings (1968–69)	9–5–3
18	L	November 24, 1968	4–7	@ Boston Bruins (1968–69)	9–6–3
19	T	November 27, 1968	3–3	@ Pittsburgh Penguins (1968–69)	9–6–4
20	T	November 30, 1968	3–3	Minnesota North Stars (1968–69)	9–6–5

December

Game	Result	Date	Score	Opponent	Record
21	L	December 1, 1968	1–3	@ New York Rangers (1968–69)	9–7–5
22	W	December 4, 1968	4–2	@ Minnesota North Stars (1968–69)	10–7–5
23	W	December 7, 1968	5–2	New York Rangers (1968–69)	11–7–5
24	W	December 8, 1968	4–1	@ Pittsburgh Penguins (1968–69)	12–7–5
25	T	December 11, 1968	4–4	Montreal Canadiens (1968–69)	12–7–6
26	W	December 12, 1968	1–0	@ Philadelphia Flyers (1968–69)	13–7–6
27	W	December 14, 1968	3–2	St. Louis Blues (1968–69)	14–7–6
28	W	December 18, 1968	5–2	Oakland Seals (1968–69)	15–7–6
29	W	December 21, 1968	8–3	Detroit Red Wings (1968–69)	16–7–6
30	L	December 22, 1968	2–3	@ Detroit Red Wings (1968–69)	16–8–6
31	W	December 25, 1968	4–3	@ Chicago Black Hawks (1968–69)	17–8–6
32	L	December 26, 1968	2–4	@ Montreal Canadiens (1968–69)	17–9–6
33	L	December 28, 1968	1–4	Los Angeles Kings (1968–69)	17–10–6

January

Game	Result	Date	Score	Opponent	Record
34	W	January 1, 1969	7–3	Oakland Seals (1968–69)	18–10–6
35	W	January 4, 1969	5–3	New York Rangers (1968–69)	19–10–6
36	T	January 5, 1969	2–2	@ Philadelphia Flyers (1968–69)	19–10–7
37	T	January 8, 1969	4–4	Philadelphia Flyers (1968–69)	19–10–8
38	L	January 9, 1969	2–3	@ Boston Bruins (1968–69)	19–11–8
39	W	January 11, 1969	4–2	Los Angeles Kings (1968–69)	20–11–8
40	T	January 15, 1969	5–5	Boston Bruins (1968–69)	20–11–9
41	T	January 18, 1969	1–1	Detroit Red Wings (1968–69)	20–11–10
42	L	January 19, 1969	3–5	@ Boston Bruins (1968–69)	20–12–10
43	W	January 23, 1969	3–2	@ St. Louis Blues (1968–69)	21–12–10
44	W	January 25, 1969	2–0	@ Pittsburgh Penguins (1968–69)	22–12–10
45	L	January 26, 1969	2–3	@ Detroit Red Wings (1968–69)	22–13–10
46	L	January 29, 1969	1–3	@ Los Angeles Kings (1968–69)	22–14–10
47	L	January 31, 1969	4–5	@ Oakland Seals (1968–69)	22–15–10

February

Game	Result	Date	Score	Opponent	Record
48	L	February 2, 1969	3–5	@ St. Louis Blues (1968–69)	22–16–10
49	T	February 5, 1969	5–5	Minnesota North Stars (1968–69)	22–16–11
50	L	February 8, 1969	1–4	Oakland Seals (1968–69)	22–17–11
51	W	February 9, 1969	5–3	@ Chicago Black Hawks (1968–69)	23–17–11
52	W	February 12, 1969	7–1	Minnesota North Stars (1968–69)	24–17–11
53	W	February 15, 1969	6–2	New York Rangers (1968–69)	25–17–11
54	L	February 16, 1969	2–4	@ New York Rangers (1968–69)	25–18–11
55	W	February 19, 1969	5–1	Montreal Canadiens (1968–69)	26–18–11
56	L	February 20, 1969	1–2	@ Montreal Canadiens (1968–69)	26–19–11
57	L	February 22, 1969	2–4	Chicago Black Hawks (1968–69)	26–20–11
58	L	February 23, 1969	2–7	@ Minnesota North Stars (1968–69)	26–21–11
59	W	February 26, 1969	3–2	St. Louis Blues (1968–69)	27–21–11
60	T	February 27, 1969	1–1	@ Philadelphia Flyers (1968–69)	27–21–12

March

Game	Result	Date	Score	Opponent	Record
61	T	March 1, 1969	3–3	Pittsburgh Penguins (1968–69)	27–21–13
62	W	March 2, 1969	2–1	Chicago Black Hawks (1968–69)	28–21–13
63	W	March 5, 1969	6–4	Los Angeles Kings (1968–69)	29–21–13
64	L	March 6, 1969	3–5	@ Montreal Canadiens (1968–69)	29–22–13
65	T	March 8, 1969	2–2	Philadelphia Flyers (1968–69)	29–22–14
66	W	March 12, 1969	4–0	@ Los Angeles Kings (1968–69)	30–22–14
67	W	March 13, 1969	3–1	@ Oakland Seals (1968–69)	31–22–14
68	W	March 15, 1969	7–4	Boston Bruins (1968–69)	32–22–14
69	L	March 16, 1969	3–11	@ Boston Bruins (1968–69)	32–23–14
70	T	March 19, 1969	1–1	@ St. Louis Blues (1968–69)	32–23–15
71	W	March 22, 1969	3–1	Detroit Red Wings (1968–69)	33–23–15
72	L	March 23, 1969	1–4	@ Chicago Black Hawks (1968–69)	33–24–15
73	W	March 26, 1969	6–4	Montreal Canadiens (1968–69)	34–24–15
74	W	March 27, 1969	4–2	@ Detroit Red Wings (1968–69)	35–24–15
75	L	March 29, 1969	2–4	New York Rangers (1968–69)	35–25–15
76	L	March 30, 1969	0–4	@ New York Rangers (1968–69)	35–26–15

Legend: Win (2 points) Loss (0 points) Tie (1 point)

== Playoffs ==
1969 Stanley Cup playoffs
Quarterfinals vs. (E4) Boston Bruins – Bruins win 4–0

Game	Result	Date	Score	Opponent	Series
1	L	April 2, 1969	0–10	@ Boston Bruins	0–1
2	L	April 3, 1969	0–7	@ Boston Bruins	0–2
3	L	April 5, 1969	3–4	Boston Bruins	0–3
4	L	April 6, 1969	2–3	Boston Bruins	0–4

Legend: Win Loss

== Player statistics ==
=== Regular season ===
Scoring

Player	GP	G	A	Pts	PIM
Norm Ullman	75	35	42	77	41
Dave Keon	75	27	34	61	12
Paul Henderson	74	27	32	59	16
Murray Oliver	76	14	36	50	16
Ron Ellis	72	25	21	46	12
Mike Walton	66	22	21	43	34
Tim Horton	74	11	29	40	107
Floyd Smith	64	15	19	34	22
Bob Pulford	72	11	23	34	20
Jim Dorey	61	8	22	30	200
George Armstrong	53	11	16	27	10
Larry Mickey	55	8	19	27	43
Pierre Pilote	69	3	18	21	46
Bill Sutherland	44	7	5	12	14
Mike Pelyk	65	3	9	12	146
Rick Ley	38	1	11	12	39
Pat Quinn	40	2	7	9	95
Brit Selby	14	2	2	4	19
Wayne Carleton	12	1	3	4	6
Marcel Pronovost	34	1	2	3	20
Forbes Kennedy	13	0	3	3	24
Gerry Meehan	25	0	2	2	2
Johnny Bower	20	0	0	0	0
Mike Byers	5	0	0	0	2
Terry Clancy	2	0	0	0	0
Bruce Gamble	61	0	0	0	2
Gary Marsh	1	0	0	0	0
Jim McKenny	7	0	0	0	2
Al Smith	7	0	0	0	0

Goaltending

Player	MIN	GP	W	L	T	GA	GAA	SA	SV	SV%	SO
Bruce Gamble	3446	61	28	20	11	161	2.80				3
Johnny Bower	779	20	5	4	3	37	2.85				2
Al Smith	335	7	2	2	1	16	2.87				0
Team:	4560	76	35	26	15	214	2.82				5

=== Playoffs ===
Scoring

Player	GP	G	A	Pts	PIM
Dave Keon	4	1	3	4	2
Ron Ellis	4	2	1	3	2
Murray Oliver	4	1	2	3	0
Norm Ullman	4	1	0	1	0
Jim Dorey	4	0	1	1	21
Paul Henderson	4	0	1	1	0
Pierre Pilote	4	0	1	1	4
George Armstrong	4	0	0	0	0
Johnny Bower	4	0	0	0	0
Bruce Gamble	3	0	0	0	0
Tim Horton	4	0	0	0	7
Forbes Kennedy	1	0	0	0	38
Rick Ley	3	0	0	0	9
Larry Mickey	3	0	0	0	5
Mike Pelyk	4	0	0	0	8
Bob Pulford	4	0	0	0	2
Pat Quinn	4	0	0	0	13
Brit Selby	4	0	0	0	4
Floyd Smith	4	0	0	0	0
Mike Walton	4	0	0	0	4

Goaltending

Player	MIN	GP	W	L	T	GA	GAA	SA	SV	SV%	SO
Johnny Bower	154	4	0	2		11	4.29				0
Bruce Gamble	86	3	0	2		13	9.07				0
Team:	240	4	0	4		24	6.00				0

== Awards and records ==
- Tim Horton, runner-up, Norris Trophy.
- Tim Horton, 1968–69 NHL First Team All-Star

== Transactions ==
The Maple Leafs have been involved in the following transactions during the 1968–69 season.

=== Trades ===
September 30, 1968	To Los Angeles Kings Gary Croteau; Brian Murphy; Wayne Thomas	To Toronto Maple Leafs Grant Moore; Lou Deveault
October 1, 1968	To Vancouver Canucks (WHL) Darryl Sly	To Toronto Maple Leafs Cash
March 2, 1969	To Philadelphia Flyers Gerry Meehan; Mike Byers; Bill Sutherland	To Toronto Maple Leafs Brit Selby; Forbes Kennedy
May 1, 1969	To Vancouver Canucks (WHL) Brad Selwood; Rene Robert	To Toronto Maple Leafs Ron Ward
May 30, 1969	To Pittsburgh Penguins Forbes Kennedy	To Toronto Maple Leafs Cash

=== Intra-league draft ===
June 11, 1969	To Pittsburgh Penguins Al Smith
June 11, 1969	To Montreal Canadiens Larry Mickey
June 11, 1969	From Pittsburgh Penguins Marv Edwards
