= 1968–69 Detroit Red Wings season =

Sports season

1968–69 Detroit Red Wings
- Division: 5th East
- 1968–69 record: 33–31–12
- Home record: 23–8–7
- Road record: 10–23–5
- Goals for: 239
- Goals against: 221

Team information
- General manager: Sid Abel
- Coach: Bill Gadsby
- Captain: Alex Delvecchio
- Alternate captains: Gary Bergman; Dean Prentice
- Arena: Detroit Olympia

Team leaders
- Goals: Gordie Howe (44)
- Assists: Gordie Howe (59)
- Points: Gordie Howe (103)
- Penalty minutes: Bob Baun (121)
- Wins: Roy Edwards (18)
- Goals against average: Roy Edwards (2.54)

The 1968–69 Detroit Red Wings season was the franchise's 43rd season of competition, 37th season as the Red Wings. The team missed the playoffs for the third year in a row for the first time in franchise history.

== Regular season ==
=== Final standings ===
East Division
		GP	W	L	T	GF	GA	DIFF	Pts
1	Montreal Canadiens	76	46	19	11	271	202	+69	103
2	Boston Bruins	76	42	18	16	303	221	+82	100
3	New York Rangers	76	41	26	9	231	196	+35	91
4	Toronto Maple Leafs	76	35	26	15	234	217	+17	85
5	Detroit Red Wings	76	33	31	12	239	221	+18	78
6	Chicago Black Hawks	76	34	33	9	280	246	+34	77

=== Record vs. opponents ===
==== Vs. East Division ====
1968–69 NHL records
Team	BOS	CHI	DET	MTL	NYR	TOR	Total
Boston	—	5–2–1	3–2–3	4–2–2	3–3–2	4–2–2	19–11–10
Chicago	2–5–1	—	3–4–1	1–7	4–3–1	3–4–1	13–23–4
Detroit	2–3–3	4–3–1	—	2–5–1	4–3–1	3–4–1	15–18–7
Montreal	2–4–2	7–1	5–2–1	—	3–4–1	4–3–1	21–14–5
New York	3–3–2	3–4–1	3–4–1	4–3–1	—	4–4	17–18–5
Toronto	2–4–2	4–3–1	4–3–1	3–4–1	4–4	—	17–18–5

==== Vs. West Division ====
1968–69 NHL records
Team	LAK	MIN	OAK	PHI	PIT	STL	Total
Boston	5–1	4–0–2	3–1–2	4–2	5–1	2–2–2	23–7–6
Chicago	5–1	5–0–1	1–5	3–0–3	4–2	3–2–1	21–10–5
Detroit	4–2	4–2	3–2–1	3–1–2	4–2	0–4–2	18–13–5
Montreal	4–0–2	5–0–1	2–3–1	5–1	4–1–1	5–0–1	25–5–6
New York	3–3	5–1	5–1	3–1–2	5–1	3–1–2	24–8–4
Toronto	3–3	3–1–2	4–2	1–1–4	3–0–3	4–1–1	18–8–10

== Schedule and results ==
1968–69 regular season
October

Game	Result	Date	Score	Opponent	Record
1	L	October 11, 1968	2–4	@ Boston Bruins (1968–69)	0–1–0
2	L	October 13, 1968	1–2	Toronto Maple Leafs (1968–69)	0–2–0
3	W	October 17, 1968	7–2	New York Rangers (1968–69)	1–2–0
4	L	October 20, 1968	2–4	Montreal Canadiens (1968–69)	1–3–0
5	W	October 27, 1968	4–3	Chicago Black Hawks (1968–69)	2–3–0
6	W	October 31, 1968	7–5	Boston Bruins (1968–69)	3–3–0

November

Game	Result	Date	Score	Opponent	Record
7	L	November 2, 1968	1–2	@ Montreal Canadiens (1968–69)	3–4–0
8	T	November 3, 1968	4–4	St. Louis Blues (1968–69)	3–4–1
9	W	November 6, 1968	6–5	@ Chicago Black Hawks (1968–69)	4–4–1
10	W	November 7, 1968	5–2	Minnesota North Stars (1968–69)	5–4–1
11	L	November 9, 1968	4–6	@ Minnesota North Stars (1968–69)	5–5–1
12	T	November 10, 1968	4–4	Montreal Canadiens (1968–69)	5–5–2
13	L	November 13, 1968	1–2	@ Oakland Seals (1968–69)	5–6–2
14	W	November 14, 1968	5–2	@ Los Angeles Kings (1968–69)	6–6–2
15	T	November 16, 1968	1–1	@ St. Louis Blues (1968–69)	6–6–3
16	L	November 20, 1968	2–3	@ Montreal Canadiens (1968–69)	6–7–3
17	W	November 23, 1968	5–2	@ Toronto Maple Leafs (1968–69)	7–7–3
18	W	November 27, 1968	5–2	@ Philadelphia Flyers (1968–69)	8–7–3
19	L	November 28, 1968	1–3	St. Louis Blues (1968–69)	8–8–3

December

Game	Result	Date	Score	Opponent	Record
20	T	December 1, 1968	3–3	Philadelphia Flyers (1968–69)	8–8–4
21	W	December 4, 1968	7–2	@ Pittsburgh Penguins (1968–69)	9–8–4
22	W	December 5, 1968	4–2	New York Rangers (1968–69)	10–8–4
23	L	December 7, 1968	1–4	@ Boston Bruins (1968–69)	10–9–4
24	W	December 8, 1968	5–2	@ New York Rangers (1968–69)	11–9–4
25	L	December 11, 1968	3–6	@ Los Angeles Kings (1968–69)	11–10–4
26	L	December 12, 1968	0–6	@ Oakland Seals (1968–69)	11–11–4
27	W	December 14, 1968	3–1	Oakland Seals (1968–69)	12–11–4
28	W	December 15, 1968	5–2	Minnesota North Stars (1968–69)	13–11–4
29	L	December 19, 1968	0–2	Chicago Black Hawks (1968–69)	13–12–4
30	L	December 21, 1968	3–8	@ Toronto Maple Leafs (1968–69)	13–13–4
31	W	December 22, 1968	3–2	Toronto Maple Leafs (1968–69)	14–13–4
32	L	December 25, 1968	3–6	@ Pittsburgh Penguins (1968–69)	14–14–4
33	T	December 27, 1968	3–3	Philadelphia Flyers (1968–69)	14–14–5
34	T	December 29, 1968	3–3	Boston Bruins (1968–69)	14–14–6
35	W	December 31, 1968	6–3	Minnesota North Stars (1968–69)	15–14–6

January

Game	Result	Date	Score	Opponent	Record
36	L	January 1, 1969	1–4	@ Chicago Black Hawks (1968–69)	15–15–6
37	L	January 4, 1969	1–3	@ St. Louis Blues (1968–69)	15–16–6
38	W	January 5, 1969	2–1	Pittsburgh Penguins (1968–69)	16–16–6
39	W	January 9, 1969	6–2	Los Angeles Kings (1968–69)	17–16–6
40	W	January 11, 1969	3–2	New York Rangers (1968–69)	18–16–6
41	W	January 12, 1969	5–1	Oakland Seals (1968–69)	19–16–6
42	W	January 15, 1969	4–0	@ Montreal Canadiens (1968–69)	20–16–6
43	W	January 16, 1969	3–2	Pittsburgh Penguins (1968–69)	21–16–6
44	T	January 18, 1969	1–1	@ Toronto Maple Leafs (1968–69)	21–16–7
45	L	January 19, 1969	1–3	@ Philadelphia Flyers (1968–69)	21–17–7
46	T	January 23, 1969	2–2	Boston Bruins (1968–69)	21–17–8
47	W	January 25, 1969	5–3	Oakland Seals (1968–69)	22–17–8
48	W	January 26, 1969	3–2	Toronto Maple Leafs (1968–69)	23–17–8
49	L	January 29, 1969	0–2	@ New York Rangers (1968–69)	23–18–8

February

Game	Result	Date	Score	Opponent	Record
50	L	February 1, 1969	0–2	St. Louis Blues (1968–69)	23–19–8
51	L	February 2, 1969	2–4	@ Boston Bruins (1968–69)	23–20–8
52	W	February 4, 1969	2–0	@ Philadelphia Flyers (1968–69)	24–20–8
53	W	February 6, 1969	6–1	Chicago Black Hawks (1968–69)	25–20–8
54	W	February 8, 1969	3–1	@ Chicago Black Hawks (1968–69)	26–20–8
55	W	February 9, 1969	5–0	Los Angeles Kings (1968–69)	27–20–8
56	L	February 13, 1969	1–3	Montreal Canadiens (1968–69)	27–21–8
57	L	February 15, 1969	2–6	@ Minnesota North Stars (1968–69)	27–22–8
58	W	February 16, 1969	6–3	Los Angeles Kings (1968–69)	28–22–8
59	T	February 19, 1969	1–1	@ New York Rangers (1968–69)	28–22–9
60	W	February 20, 1969	3–0	Pittsburgh Penguins (1968–69)	29–22–9
61	L	February 22, 1969	2–3	@ Pittsburgh Penguins (1968–69)	29–23–9
62	W	February 23, 1969	9–1	Philadelphia Flyers (1968–69)	30–23–9
63	L	February 26, 1969	2–7	@ Montreal Canadiens (1968–69)	30–24–9

March

Game	Result	Date	Score	Opponent	Record
64	W	March 1, 1969	4–2	@ Minnesota North Stars (1968–69)	31–24–9
65	W	March 2, 1969	4–2	Montreal Canadiens (1968–69)	32–24–9
66	T	March 5, 1969	2–2	@ Boston Bruins (1968–69)	32–24–10
67	L	March 6, 1969	1–4	New York Rangers (1968–69)	32–25–10
68	W	March 8, 1969	7–4	Boston Bruins (1968–69)	33–25–10
69	L	March 15, 1969	2–3	@ St. Louis Blues (1968–69)	33–26–10
70	L	March 16, 1969	4–6	@ New York Rangers (1968–69)	33–27–10
71	T	March 19, 1969	4–4	@ Oakland Seals (1968–69)	33–27–11
72	L	March 20, 1969	2–4	@ Los Angeles Kings (1968–69)	33–28–11
73	L	March 22, 1969	1–3	@ Toronto Maple Leafs (1968–69)	33–29–11
74	L	March 27, 1969	2–4	Toronto Maple Leafs (1968–69)	33–30–11
75	T	March 29, 1969	1–1	Chicago Black Hawks (1968–69)	33–30–12
76	L	March 30, 1969	5–9	@ Chicago Black Hawks (1968–69)	33–31–12

Legend: Win (2 points) Loss (0 points) Tie (1 point)

== Player statistics ==
=== Regular season ===
Scoring

Player	Pos	GP	G	A	Pts	PIM	PPG	SHG	GWG
Gordie Howe	RW	76	44	59	103	58	9	0	6
Alex Delvecchio	C/LW	72	25	58	83	8	7	0	2
Frank Mahovlich	LW	76	49	29	78	38	7	0	5
Pete Stemkowski	C	71	21	31	52	81	3	2	4
Garry Unger	C	76	24	20	44	33	5	1	4
Bruce MacGregor	C	69	18	23	41	14	2	3	3
Gary Bergman	D	76	7	30	37	80	2	0	2
Dean Prentice	LW	74	14	20	34	18	2	1	1
Kent Douglas	D	69	2	29	31	97	1	0	0
Nick Libett	LW	75	10	14	24	34	1	0	2
Bob Baun	D	76	4	16	20	121	0	0	0
Ron Harris	D	73	3	13	16	91	0	0	1
Poul Popiel	D	62	2	13	15	82	0	0	2
Wayne Connelly	C	19	4	9	13	0	1	0	0
Danny Lawson	RW	44	5	7	12	21	0	0	0
Hank Monteith	LW	34	1	9	10	6	0	0	0
Rene Leclerc	RW	43	2	3	5	62	0	0	0
Pete Mahovlich	C	30	2	2	4	21	0	0	0
Ed Hatoum	RW	16	2	1	3	2	0	0	1
Jim Watson	D	8	0	1	1	4	0	0	0
Ron Anderson	RW	7	0	0	0	8	0	0	0
Bart Crashley	D	1	0	0	0	0	0	0	0
Roger Crozier	G	38	0	0	0	0	0	0	0
Roy Edwards	G	40	0	0	0	0	0	0	0
Bob Falkenberg	D	5	0	0	0	0	0	0	0
Gerry Hart	D	1	0	0	0	2	0	0	0
Rick McCann	C	3	0	0	0	0	0	0	0
Terry Sawchuk	G	13	0	0	0	0	0	0	0
Sandy Snow	RW	3	0	0	0	2	0	0	0
Fred Speck	C	5	0	0	0	2	0	0	0

Goaltending

Player	MIN	GP	W	L	T	GA	GAA	SO
Roy Edwards	2099	40	18	11	6	89	2.54	4
Roger Crozier	1820	38	12	16	3	101	3.33	0
Terry Sawchuk	641	13	3	4	3	28	2.62	0
Team:	4560	76	33	31	12	218	2.87	4

Note: GP = Games played; G = Goals; A = Assists; Pts = Points; +/- = Plus-minus PIM = Penalty minutes; PPG = Power-play goals; SHG = Short-handed goals; GWG = Game-winning goals;
MIN = Minutes played; W = Wins; L = Losses; T = Ties; GA = Goals against; GAA = Goals-against average; SO = Shutouts;

== Draft picks ==
Detroit's draft picks at the 1968 NHL amateur draft held at the Queen Elizabeth Hotel in Montreal.

Round	#	Player	Nationality	College/Junior/Club team (League)
1	11	Steve Andrascik	Canada	Flin Flon Bombers (WCHL)
2	17	Herb Boxer	United States	Michigan Tech Huskies (NCAA)

== See also ==
- 1968–69 NHL season
