= West Division (NHL) =

National Hockey League division

- Formerly: Pacific Division, Central Division (2020)
- League: National Hockey League
- Sport: Ice hockey
- Founded: 1967 (original); 2020 (second)
- Folded: 1974 (original); 2021 (second)
- Replaced by: Campbell Conference (1974); Pacific Division, Central Division (2021)
- Last champion: Colorado Avalanche (1st title) (2021)
- Most titles: Chicago Black Hawks (3)

The West Division of the National Hockey League existed from 1967 until 1974 when the league realigned into two conferences of two divisions each. The division was reformed for the 2020–21 NHL season (and branded as the Honda West Division for sponsorship reasons) due to the COVID-19 pandemic.

In 1967 the NHL doubled in size, going from six teams to twelve. The Original Six, as the pre-1967 teams became retroactively known, were grouped into the East Division, while the expansion teams were placed into the West Division. This was done in order to keep teams of similar competitive strength in the same division, regardless of geographic distance, and to ensure playoff revenue for the new franchises.

When the NHL expanded again in 1970, the two new teams, the Vancouver Canucks and Buffalo Sabres, were placed into the stronger East Division. In an effort to create more balanced competition, the Chicago Black Hawks were transferred into the West Division. When the NHL expanded again in 1972, each division was given one of the expansion clubs, with the New York Islanders joining the East Division and the Atlanta Flames joining the West Division.

By 1974, another two teams (the Washington Capitals and Kansas City Scouts) entered the league, and the league underwent a major overhaul. The East and West Divisions were renamed the Prince of Wales and Clarence Campbell Conferences, respectively, composed of nine teams each. The conferences were further divided into two divisions: the Norris and Adams Divisions for the Wales Conference; the Patrick and Smythe Divisions for the Campbell Conference. Because the Conferences were not composed based on geography, the league opted to name the conferences and divisions after notable persons associated with the NHL.

The East and West Divisions were re-formed for the 2020–21 season as the result of the COVID-19 pandemic which forced the NHL to radically re-structure the league and to temporarily abolish the conferences. All eight West Division teams were members of the Western Conference in the 2019–20 season.

== Division lineups ==
=== 1967–1970 ===
1967–1970 West Division Teams
- Los Angeles Kings
- Minnesota North Stars
- Oakland Seals
- Philadelphia Flyers
- Pittsburgh Penguins
- St. Louis Blues

==== Changes from the 1966–67 season ====
- The West Division is formed as the result of NHL realignment
- All teams are added as expansion teams

=== 1970–1972 ===
1970–1972 West Division Teams
- California Golden Seals
- Chicago Black Hawks
- Los Angeles Kings
- Minnesota North Stars
- Philadelphia Flyers
- Pittsburgh Penguins
- St. Louis Blues

==== Changes from the 1969–70 season ====
- The Oakland Seals change their name to the California Golden Seals
- The Chicago Black Hawks come from the East Division

=== 1972–1974 ===
1972–1974 West Division Teams
- Atlanta Flames
- California Golden Seals
- Chicago Black Hawks
- Los Angeles Kings
- Minnesota North Stars
- Philadelphia Flyers
- Pittsburgh Penguins
- St. Louis Blues

==== Changes from the 1971–72 season ====
- The Atlanta Flames are added as an expansion team

=== After the 1973–74 season ===
The league was reformatted into two conferences with two divisions each. The California Golden Seals moved to the Adams Division. The Los Angeles Kings and Pittsburgh Penguins moved to the Norris Division. The Atlanta Flames and Philadelphia Flyers moved to the Patrick Division, while the Chicago Black Hawks, Minnesota North Stars, and St. Louis Blues moved to the Smythe Division.

=== 2020–21 ===
2020–2021 West Division Teams
- Anaheim Ducks
- Arizona Coyotes
- Colorado Avalanche
- Los Angeles Kings
- Minnesota Wild
- San Jose Sharks
- St. Louis Blues
- Vegas Golden Knights

==== Changes from the 2019–20 season ====
- Due to COVID-19 restrictions the NHL realigned for the 2020–21 season
- The West Division is reformed for the 2020–21 NHL season
- The Anaheim Ducks, Arizona Coyotes, Los Angeles Kings, San Jose Sharks and Vegas Golden Knights come from the Pacific Division
- The Colorado Avalanche, Minnesota Wild and St. Louis Blues come from the Central Division

==== Changes from the 2020–21 season ====
- The division is dissolved as the league returned to previous two conference and four division alignment
- The Arizona Coyotes, Colorado Avalanche, Minnesota Wild and St. Louis Blues move to the Central Division
- The Anaheim Ducks, Los Angeles Kings, San Jose Sharks and Vegas Golden Knights move to the Pacific Division

== Season results ==
^{(#)}	Denotes team that won the Stanley Cup
^{(#)}	Denotes team that lost Stanley Cup Final
^{(#)}	Denotes team that qualified for the Stanley Cup playoffs
‡	Denotes winner of the Presidents' Trophy

Season	1st	2nd	3rd	4th	5th	6th	7th	8th
1967–68	Philadelphia (73)	Los Angeles (72)	St. Louis (70)	Minnesota (69)	Pittsburgh (67)	Oakland (47)		
1968–69	St. Louis (88)	Oakland (69)	Philadelphia (61)	Los Angeles (58)	Pittsburgh (51)	Minnesota (51)		
1969–70	St. Louis (86)	Pittsburgh (64)	Minnesota (60)	Oakland (58)	Philadelphia (58)	Los Angeles (38)		
1970–71	Chicago (107)	St. Louis (87)	Philadelphia (73)	Minnesota (72)	Los Angeles (63)	Pittsburgh (62)	California (45)	
1971–72	Chicago (107)	Minnesota (86)	St. Louis (67)	Pittsburgh (66)	Philadelphia (66)	California (60)	Los Angeles (49)	
1972–73	Chicago (93)	Philadelphia (85)	Minnesota (85)	St. Louis (76)	Pittsburgh (73)	Los Angeles (73)	Atlanta (65)	California (48)
1973–74	Philadelphia (112)	Chicago (105)	Los Angeles (78)	Atlanta (74)	Pittsburgh (65)	St. Louis (64)	Minnesota (63)	California (36)
Division not used from 1974–2020
2020–21	Colorado (82)^{‡}	Vegas (82)	Minnesota (75)	St. Louis (63)	Arizona (54)	Los Angeles (49)	San Jose (49)	Anaheim (43)

== West Division titles won by team ==
Teams in bold were in the division in its most recent season.

Team	Wins	Last win
Chicago Blackhawks	3	1973
**St. Louis Blues**	2	1970
Philadelphia Flyers	2	1974
**Colorado Avalanche**	1	2021
**Anaheim Ducks**	0	—
Atlanta Flames	0	—
**Arizona Coyotes**	0	—
Oakland Seals / California Golden Seals	0	—
**Los Angeles Kings**	0	—
Minnesota North Stars	0	—
**Minnesota Wild**	0	—
Pittsburgh Penguins	0	—
**San Jose Sharks**	0	—
**Vegas Golden Knights**	0	—
