= 1968–69 New York Rangers season =

NHL hockey team season

1968–69 New York Rangers
- Division: 3rd East
- 1968–69 record: 41–26–9
- Home record: 27–7–4
- Road record: 14–19–5
- Goals for: 231
- Goals against: 196

Team information
- General manager: Emile Francis
- Coach: Bernie Geoffrion; Emile Francis
- Captain: Bob Nevin
- Alternate captains: Jim Neilson; Don Marshall; Rod Gilbert
- Arena: Madison Square Garden

Team leaders
- Goals: Jean Ratelle (32)
- Assists: Rod Gilbert (49)
- Points: Jean Ratelle (78)
- Penalty minutes: Reggie Fleming (138)
- Wins: Ed Giacomin (37)
- Goals against average: Gilles Villemure (2.25)

The 1968–69 New York Rangers season was the franchise's 43rd season. The Rangers finished in third place in the East Division with 91 points and advanced to the playoffs, where they lost to the Montreal Canadiens in the quarter-finals.

== Regular season ==
=== Final standings ===
East Division
		GP	W	L	T	GF	GA	DIFF	Pts
1	Montreal Canadiens	76	46	19	11	271	202	+69	103
2	Boston Bruins	76	42	18	16	303	221	+82	100
3	New York Rangers	76	41	26	9	231	196	+35	91
4	Toronto Maple Leafs	76	35	26	15	234	217	+17	85
5	Detroit Red Wings	76	33	31	12	239	221	+18	78
6	Chicago Black Hawks	76	34	33	9	280	246	+34	77

=== Record vs. opponents ===
==== Vs. East Division ====
1968–69 NHL records
Team	BOS	CHI	DET	MTL	NYR	TOR	Total
Boston	—	5–2–1	3–2–3	4–2–2	3–3–2	4–2–2	19–11–10
Chicago	2–5–1	—	3–4–1	1–7	4–3–1	3–4–1	13–23–4
Detroit	2–3–3	4–3–1	—	2–5–1	4–3–1	3–4–1	15–18–7
Montreal	2–4–2	7–1	5–2–1	—	3–4–1	4–3–1	21–14–5
New York	3–3–2	3–4–1	3–4–1	4–3–1	—	4–4	17–18–5
Toronto	2–4–2	4–3–1	4–3–1	3–4–1	4–4	—	17–18–5

==== Vs. West Division ====
1968–69 NHL records
Team	LAK	MIN	OAK	PHI	PIT	STL	Total
Boston	5–1	4–0–2	3–1–2	4–2	5–1	2–2–2	23–7–6
Chicago	5–1	5–0–1	1–5	3–0–3	4–2	3–2–1	21–10–5
Detroit	4–2	4–2	3–2–1	3–1–2	4–2	0–4–2	18–13–5
Montreal	4–0–2	5–0–1	2–3–1	5–1	4–1–1	5–0–1	25–5–6
New York	3–3	5–1	5–1	3–1–2	5–1	3–1–2	24–8–4
Toronto	3–3	3–1–2	4–2	1–1–4	3–0–3	4–1–1	18–8–10

== Schedule and results ==
1968–69 regular season
October: 6–3–0 (home: 4–1–0; road: 2–2–0)

Game	October	Opponent	Score	Record
1	13	@ Chicago Black Hawks	5–2	0–1–0
2	16	Philadelphia Flyers	3–1	1–1–0
3	17	@ Detroit Red Wings	7–2	1–2–0
4	20	Los Angeles Kings	7–0	2–2–0
5	23	Oakland Seals	6–1	3–2–0
6	26	@ Minnesota North Stars	3–0	4–2–0
7	27	Toronto Maple Leafs	5–3	4–3–0
8	30	Pittsburgh Penguins	7–3	5–3–0
9	31	@ Philadelphia Flyers	2–1	6–3–0

November: 8–4–0 (home: 4–2–0; road: 4–2–0)

Game	November	Opponent	Score	Record
10	3	Minnesota North Stars	2–1	7–3–0
11	6	@ Los Angeles Kings	2–0	7–4–0
12	8	@ Oakland Seals	3–2	8–4–0
13	10	@ Chicago Black Hawks	4–2	9–4–0
14	13	St. Louis Blues	3–1	9–5–0
15	16	@ Pittsburgh Penguins	2–1	10–5–0
16	17	Montreal Canadiens	3–2	11–5–0
17	20	Los Angeles Kings	4–2	12–5–0
18	23	@ Boston Bruins	5–1	12–6–0
19	24	Oakland Seals	3–2	13–6–0
20	27	Chicago Black Hawks	4–2	13–7–0
21	30	@ Boston Bruins	4–1	14–7–0

December: 5–7–3 (home: 4–3–1; road: 1–4–2)

Game	December	Opponent	Score	Record
22	1	Toronto Maple Leafs	3–1	15–7–0
23	4	@ Montreal Canadiens	4–2	16–7–0
24	5	@ Detroit Red Wings	4–2	16–8–0
25	7	@ Toronto Maple Leafs	5–2	16–9–0
26	8	Detroit Red Wings	5–2	16–10–0
27	11	Boston Bruins	2–2	16–10–1
28	14	@ Minnesota North Stars	4–1	16–11–1
29	15	Philadelphia Flyers	3–1	16–12–1
30	18	Chicago Black Hawks	3–1	16–13–1
31	21	@ St. Louis Blues	2–2	16–13–2
32	22	Minnesota North Stars	4–2	17–13–2
33	25	@ Philadelphia Flyers	2–2	17–13–3
34	26	Oakland Seals	3–1	18–13–3
35	28	@ Montreal Canadiens	5–3	18–14–3
36	29	Montreal Canadiens	3–1	19–14–3

January: 8–4–1 (home: 5–1–0; road: 3–3–1)

Game	January	Opponent	Score	Record
37	2	Boston Bruins	4–2	19–15–3
38	4	@ Toronto Maple Leafs	5–3	19–16–3
39	5	Minnesota North Stars	5–1	20–16–3
40	9	@ Philadelphia Flyers	3–1	21–16–3
41	11	@ Detroit Red Wings	3–2	21–17–3
42	14	@ Los Angeles Kings	3–1	21–18–3
43	17	@ Oakland Seals	3–1	22–18–3
44	18	@ St. Louis Blues	2–2	22–18–4
45	23	Los Angeles Kings	3–1	23–18–4
46	25	Chicago Black Hawks	3–0	24–18–4
47	26	Montreal Canadiens	3–2	25–18–4
48	29	Detroit Red Wings	2–0	26–18–4
49	30	@ St. Louis Blues	4–3	27–18–4

February: 5–5–2 (home: 5–0–2; road: 0–5–0)

Game	February	Opponent	Score	Record
50	1	@ Montreal Canadiens	6–2	27–19–4
51	2	Pittsburgh Penguins	7–3	28–19–4
52	5	@ Pittsburgh Penguins	3–2	28–20–4
53	8	St. Louis Blues	2–0	29–20–4
54	9	Philadelphia Flyers	3–3	29–20–5
55	12	@ Oakland Seals	3–2	29–21–5
56	13	@ Los Angeles Kings	4–1	29–22–5
57	15	@ Toronto Maple Leafs	6–2	29–23–5
58	16	Toronto Maple Leafs	4–2	30–23–5
59	19	Detroit Red Wings	1–1	30–23–6
60	23	Boston Bruins	9–0	31–23–6
61	26	Chicago Black Hawks	5–3	32–23–6

March: 9–3–3 (home: 5–0–1; road: 4–3–2)

Game	March	Opponent	Score	Record
62	1	@ Boston Bruins	8–5	32–24–6
63	2	St. Louis Blues	2–1	33–24–6
64	5	@ Chicago Black Hawks	4–4	33–24–7
65	6	@ Detroit Red Wings	4–1	34–24–7
66	8	@ Pittsburgh Penguins	5–3	35–24–7
67	9	Montreal Canadiens	2–2	35–24–8
68	12	Pittsburgh Penguins	4–3	36–24–8
69	16	Detroit Red Wings	6–4	37–24–8
70	19	@ Minnesota North Stars	4–2	38–24–8
71	22	@ Montreal Canadiens	3–1	38–25–8
72	23	Boston Bruins	4–2	39–25–8
73	26	@ Chicago Black Hawks	6–4	39–26–8
74	27	@ Boston Bruins	3–3	39–26–9
75	29	@ Toronto Maple Leafs	4–2	40–26–9
76	30	Toronto Maple Leafs	4–0	41–26–9

Legend: Win (2 points) Loss (0 points) Tie (1 point)

== Playoffs ==
1969 Stanley Cup playoffs
Quarterfinals vs. (E1) Montreal Canadiens – Canadiens win 4–0

Game	Date	Visitor	Score	Home	OT	Series
1	April 2	New York Rangers	1–3	Montreal Canadiens		Montreal leads series 1–0
2	April 3	New York Rangers	2–5	Montreal Canadiens		Montreal leads series 2–0
3	April 5	Montreal Canadiens	4–1	New York Rangers		Montreal leads series 3–0
4	April 6	Montreal Canadiens	4–3	New York Rangers		Montreal wins series 4–0

Legend: Win Loss

== Player statistics ==
Skaters

Regular season
Player	GP	G	A	Pts	PIM
Jean Ratelle	75	32	46	78	26
Rod Gilbert	66	28	49	77	22
Vic Hadfield	73	26	40	66	108
Bob Nevin	71	31	25	56	14
Phil Goyette	67	13	32	45	8
Jim Neilson	76	10	34	44	95
Donnie Marshall	74	20	19	39	12
Walt Tkaczuk	71	12	24	36	28
Dave Balon	75	10	21	31	57
Ron Stewart	75	18	11	29	20
Brad Park	54	3	23	26	70
Arnie Brown	74	10	12	22	48
Rod Seiling	73	4	17	21	75
Reg Fleming	72	8	12	20	138
Harry Howell	56	4	7	11	36
Larry Jeffrey	75	1	6	7	12
Dennis Hextall	13	1	4	5	25
Bill Fairbairn	1	0	0	0	0
Orland Kurtenbach	2	0	0	0	2
Guy Trottier	2	0	0	0	0
Bob Jones	2	0	0	0	0
Wayne Rivers	4	0	0	0	0
Bob Blackburn	11	0	0	0	0
Al Hamilton	16	0	0	0	8

Playoffs
Player	GP	G	A	Pts	PIM
Jim Neilson	4	0	3	3	5
Vic Hadfield	4	2	1	3	2
Brad Park	4	0	2	2	7
Bob Nevin	4	0	2	2	0
Rod Seiling	4	1	0	1	2
Arnie Brown	4	0	1	1	0
Ron Stewart	4	0	1	1	0
Dave Balon	4	1	0	1	0
Walt Tkaczuk	4	0	1	1	6
Donnie Marshall	4	1	0	1	0
Rod Gilbert	4	1	0	1	2
Jean Ratelle	4	1	0	1	0
Al Hamilton	1	0	0	0	0
Larry Jeffrey	4	0	0	0	2
Harry Howell	2	0	0	0	0
Reg Fleming	3	0	0	0	7
Phil Goyette	3	0	0	0	0

Goaltenders

Regular season
Player	GP	TOI	W	L	T	GA	GAA	SO
Ed Giacomin	70	4114	37	23	7	175	2.55	7
Don Simmons	5	206	2	2	1	8	2.33	0
Gilles Villemure	4	240	2	1	1	9	2.25	0

Playoffs
Player	GP	TOI	W	L	GA	GAA	SO
Ed Giacomin	3	180	0	3	10	3.33	0
Gilles Villemure	1	60	0	1	4	4.00	0

^{†}Denotes player spent time with another team before joining Rangers. Stats reflect time with Rangers only.
^{‡}Traded mid-season. Stats reflect time with Rangers only.

Note:

Pos = Position;GP = Games played; G = Goals; A = Assists; Pts = Points; PIM = Penalty minutes; +/- = Plus/minus; PPG = Power-play goals; SHG = Short-handed goals; GWG = Game-winning goals
Pos = Position;GP = Games played; Min, TOI = Minutes played; W = Wins; L = Losses; T,T/OT = Ties; OTL = Overtime losses; GA = Goals-against; GAA = Goals-against average; SO = Shutouts; SA = Shots against; SV = Shots saved;SV% = Save percentage;

== Draft picks ==
New York's pick at the 1968 NHL amateur draft in Montreal, Canada.

Round	#	Player	Position	Nationality	College/Junior/Club team (League)
2	19	Barry Buchanan	D	Canada	Weyburn Red Wings (WCHL)

== See also ==
- 1968–69 NHL season
