= 1968–69 Chicago Black Hawks season =

National Hockey League team season

1968–69 Chicago Black Hawks
- Division: 6th East
- 1968–69 record: 34–33–9
- Home record: 20–14–4
- Road record: 14–19–5
- Goals for: 280
- Goals against: 246

Team information
- General manager: Tommy Ivan
- Coach: Billy Reay
- Captain: Vacant
- Alternate captains: Stan Mikita; Bobby Hull; Pat Stapleton
- Arena: Chicago Stadium

Team leaders
- Goals: Bobby Hull (58)
- Assists: Stan Mikita (67)
- Points: Bobby Hull (107)
- Penalty minutes: Gilles Marotte (120)
- Plus/minus: Pat Stapleton and Gilles Marotte (+23)
- Wins: Denis DeJordy (22)
- Goals against average: Denis DeJordy (3.14)

The 1968–69 Chicago Black Hawks season was the Hawks' 43rd season in the NHL, and the club was coming off a 4th-place finish in the East Division in 1967–68, as they earned 80 points, and qualified for the post-season for the tenth consecutive season. The Black Hawks then upset the second place New York Rangers in the NHL quarter-finals, before falling to the Montreal Canadiens in five games in the NHL semi-finals. But this season, the Blackhawks missed the postseason for the last time until 1998.

== Offseason ==
The NHL announced during the summer that the league would once again increase its schedule, as it went from 74 games to 76.

During the off-season, the Black Hawks traded team captain Pierre Pilote to the Toronto Maple Leafs in exchange for Jim Pappin. Pilote had been the captain since the 1961–62 season, and head coach Billy Reay decided to not name a captain for the club for the season.

== Regular season ==
The Black Hawks would start the season off on the right foot, beginning the year with a four-game winning streak, however, the team would eventually fall into a slump, and sit with a 6–6–0 record twelve games in. Chicago would then get hot again, and eventually found themselves a season high eight games over .500 during their streak, and found themselves in a heated playoff race with the Toronto Maple Leafs and Detroit Red Wings for the fourth and final playoff position in the East. The Hawks would then fall into a slump, as they had winless streaks of five games and eight games, to fall out of the race, and into the cellar of the East Division. Chicago would end the year with an over .500 record, as they were 34–33–9, earning 77 points, however, the team finished in last, and missed the playoffs for the first time since 1957–58.

Offensively, the Hawks were led by Bobby Hull, who once again set an NHL record for goals in a season, as he scored 58 times, and he became the second player in league history to record 100 points, as he finished the season with 107 points, which was second in league scoring. Stan Mikita had another excellent season also, scoring 30 goals and earning 97 points as he finished fourth in NHL scoring. Newly acquired Jim Pappin fit right in, scoring 30 goals and 70 points. Kenny Wharram and Dennis Hull also scored 30 goals to give the Hawks five players with 30+ goals in the season. Pat Stapleton led the defense with 56 points, while Gilles Marotte led the team with 120 penalty minutes, and tied Stapleton with the team lead in plus/minus, with a +23.

In goal, Denis DeJordy saw most of the action, playing in 53 games, earning a team high 22 victories, and a team best 3.14 GAA, along with 2 shutouts. Backup Dave Dryden played well, earning 11 victories, while earning a team best 3 shutouts.

=== Season standings ===
East Division
		GP	W	L	T	GF	GA	DIFF	Pts
1	Montreal Canadiens	76	46	19	11	271	202	+69	103
2	Boston Bruins	76	42	18	16	303	221	+82	100
3	New York Rangers	76	41	26	9	231	196	+35	91
4	Toronto Maple Leafs	76	35	26	15	234	217	+17	85
5	Detroit Red Wings	76	33	31	12	239	221	+18	78
6	Chicago Black Hawks	76	34	33	9	280	246	+34	77

=== Record vs. opponents ===
==== Vs. East Division ====
1968–69 NHL records
Team	BOS	CHI	DET	MTL	NYR	TOR	Total
Boston	—	5–2–1	3–2–3	4–2–2	3–3–2	4–2–2	19–11–10
Chicago	2–5–1	—	3–4–1	1–7	4–3–1	3–4–1	13–23–4
Detroit	2–3–3	4–3–1	—	2–5–1	4–3–1	3–4–1	15–18–7
Montreal	2–4–2	7–1	5–2–1	—	3–4–1	4–3–1	21–14–5
New York	3–3–2	3–4–1	3–4–1	4–3–1	—	4–4	17–18–5
Toronto	2–4–2	4–3–1	4–3–1	3–4–1	4–4	—	17–18–5

==== Vs. West Division ====
1968–69 NHL records
Team	LAK	MIN	OAK	PHI	PIT	STL	Total
Boston	5–1	4–0–2	3–1–2	4–2	5–1	2–2–2	23–7–6
Chicago	5–1	5–0–1	1–5	3–0–3	4–2	3–2–1	21–10–5
Detroit	4–2	4–2	3–2–1	3–1–2	4–2	0–4–2	18–13–5
Montreal	4–0–2	5–0–1	2–3–1	5–1	4–1–1	5–0–1	25–5–6
New York	3–3	5–1	5–1	3–1–2	5–1	3–1–2	24–8–4
Toronto	3–3	3–1–2	4–2	1–1–4	3–0–3	4–1–1	18–8–10

== Schedule and results ==
1968–69 regular season
October

Game	Date	Visitor	Score	Home	Record	Points
1	October 11	St. Louis Blues	3–4	Chicago Black Hawks	1–0–0	2
2	October 13	New York Rangers	2–5	Chicago Black Hawks	2–0–0	4
3	October 16	Minnesota North Stars	4–10	Chicago Black Hawks	3–0–0	6
4	October 19	Chicago Black Hawks	3–1	Toronto Maple Leafs	4–0–0	8
5	October 20	Oakland Seals	4–3	Chicago Black Hawks	4–1–0	8
6	October 23	Chicago Black Hawks	8–5	Pittsburgh Penguins	5–1–0	10
7	October 27	Chicago Black Hawks	3–4	Detroit Red Wings	5–2–0	10
8	October 30	Chicago Black Hawks	4–2	Los Angeles Kings	6–2–0	12

November

Game	Date	Visitor	Score	Home	Record	Points
9	November 1	Chicago Black Hawks	2–5	Oakland Seals	6–3–0	12
10	November 3	Chicago Black Hawks	3–5	Boston Bruins	6–4–0	12
11	November 6	Detroit Red Wings	6–5	Chicago Black Hawks	6–5–0	12
12	November 10	New York Rangers	4–2	Chicago Black Hawks	6–6–0	12
13	November 13	Pittsburgh Penguins	5–6	Chicago Black Hawks	7–6–0	14
14	November 14	Chicago Black Hawks	6–4	Pittsburgh Penguins	8–6–0	16
15	November 16	Chicago Black Hawks	1–3	Toronto Maple Leafs	8–7–0	16
16	November 17	Toronto Maple Leafs	1–1	Chicago Black Hawks	8–7–1	17
17	November 20	Chicago Black Hawks	2–0	Minnesota North Stars	9–7–1	19
18	November 23	Chicago Black Hawks	0–1	St. Louis Blues	9–8–1	19
19	November 24	Minnesota North Stars	0–6	Chicago Black Hawks	10–8–1	21
20	November 27	Chicago Black Hawks	4–2	New York Rangers	11–8–1	23
21	November 28	Pittsburgh Penguins	3–2	Chicago Black Hawks	11–9–1	23

December

Game	Date	Visitor	Score	Home	Record	Points
22	December 1	Montreal Canadiens	3–1	Chicago Black Hawks	11–10–1	23
23	December 4	Chicago Black Hawks	3–3	St. Louis Blues	11–10–2	24
24	December 7	Chicago Black Hawks	3–6	Montreal Canadiens	11–11–2	24
25	December 8	Boston Bruins	4–7	Chicago Black Hawks	12–11–2	26
26	December 11	St. Louis Blues	3–6	Chicago Black Hawks	13–11–2	28
27	December 14	Chicago Black Hawks	5–10	Boston Bruins	13–12–2	28
28	December 15	Oakland Seals	4–7	Chicago Black Hawks	14–12–2	30
29	December 18	Chicago Black Hawks	3–1	New York Rangers	15–12–2	32
30	December 19	Chicago Black Hawks	2–0	Detroit Red Wings	16–12–2	34
31	December 22	Pittsburgh Penguins	1–3	Chicago Black Hawks	17–12–2	36
32	December 25	Toronto Maple Leafs	4–3	Chicago Black Hawks	17–13–2	36
33	December 28	Chicago Black Hawks	5–2	Minnesota North Stars	18–13–2	38
34	December 29	Los Angeles Kings	1–4	Chicago Black Hawks	19–13–2	40

January

Game	Date	Visitor	Score	Home	Record	Points
35	January 1	Detroit Red Wings	1–4	Chicago Black Hawks	20–13–2	42
36	January 2	Chicago Black Hawks	2–2	Philadelphia Flyers	20–13–3	43
37	January 4	Chicago Black Hawks	6–3	Montreal Canadiens	21–13–3	45
38	January 5	Montreal Canadiens	4–2	Chicago Black Hawks	21–14–3	45
39	January 8	St. Louis Blues	1–3	Chicago Black Hawks	22–14–3	47
40	January 11	Chicago Black Hawks	1–6	St. Louis Blues	22–15–3	47
41	January 12	Los Angeles Kings	2–4	Chicago Black Hawks	23–15–3	49
42	January 15	Chicago Black Hawks	3–4	Oakland Seals	23–16–3	49
43	January 16	Chicago Black Hawks	2–3	Los Angeles Kings	23–17–3	49
44	January 18	Chicago Black Hawks	1–3	Montreal Canadiens	23–18–3	49
45	January 23	Philadelphia Flyers	2–2	Chicago Black Hawks	23–18–4	50
46	January 25	Chicago Black Hawks	0–3	New York Rangers	23–19–4	50
47	January 26	Los Angeles Kings	3–9	Chicago Black Hawks	24–19–4	52
48	January 30	Chicago Black Hawks	12–0	Philadelphia Flyers	25–19–4	54

February

Game	Date	Visitor	Score	Home	Record	Points
49	February 1	Chicago Black Hawks	5–5	Minnesota North Stars	25–19–5	55
50	February 2	Montreal Canadiens	6–4	Chicago Black Hawks	25–20–5	55
51	February 5	Boston Bruins	7–2	Chicago Black Hawks	25–21–5	55
52	February 6	Chicago Black Hawks	1–6	Detroit Red Wings	25–22–5	55
53	February 8	Detroit Red Wings	3–1	Chicago Black Hawks	25–23–5	55
54	February 9	Toronto Maple Leafs	5–3	Chicago Black Hawks	25–24–5	55
55	February 11	Chicago Black Hawks	3–7	Boston Bruins	25–25–5	55
56	February 12	Philadelphia Flyers	3–3	Chicago Black Hawks	25–25–6	56
57	February 15	Chicago Black Hawks	3–0	Philadelphia Flyers	26–25–6	58
58	February 16	Boston Bruins	1–5	Chicago Black Hawks	27–25–6	60
59	February 19	Chicago Black Hawks	2–5	Oakland Seals	27–26–6	60
60	February 20	Chicago Black Hawks	6–2	Los Angeles Kings	28–26–6	62
61	February 22	Chicago Black Hawks	4–2	Toronto Maple Leafs	29–26–6	64
62	February 26	Chicago Black Hawks	3–5	New York Rangers	29–27–6	64
63	February 27	Chicago Black Hawks	3–4	Pittsburgh Penguins	29–28–6	64

March

Game	Date	Visitor	Score	Home	Record	Points
64	March 2	Chicago Black Hawks	1–2	Toronto Maple Leafs	29–29–6	64
65	March 3	Minnesota North Stars	1–6	Chicago Black Hawks	30–29–6	66
66	March 5	New York Rangers	4–4	Chicago Black Hawks	30–29–7	67
67	March 12	Oakland Seals	4–1	Chicago Black Hawks	30–30–7	67
68	March 15	Chicago Black Hawks	1–3	Montreal Canadiens	30–31–7	67
69	March 16	Philadelphia Flyers	2–6	Chicago Black Hawks	31–31–7	69
70	March 19	Montreal Canadiens	5–2	Chicago Black Hawks	31–32–7	69
71	March 20	Chicago Black Hawks	5–5	Boston Bruins	31–32–8	70
72	March 22	Boston Bruins	5–3	Chicago Black Hawks	31–33–8	70
73	March 23	Toronto Maple Leafs	1–4	Chicago Black Hawks	32–33–8	72
74	March 26	New York Rangers	4–6	Chicago Black Hawks	33–33–8	74
75	March 29	Chicago Black Hawks	1–1	Detroit Red Wings	33–33–9	75
76	March 30	Detroit Red Wings	5–9	Chicago Black Hawks	34–33–9	77

Legend: Win (2 points) Loss (0 points) Tie (1 point)

== Season stats ==
=== Scoring leaders ===
Player	GP	G	A	Pts	PIM
Bobby Hull	74	58	49	107	48
Stan Mikita	74	30	67	97	52
Jim Pappin	75	30	40	70	49
Kenny Wharram	76	30	39	69	19
Dennis Hull	72	30	34	64	25

=== Goaltending ===
Player	GP	TOI	W	L	T	GA	SO	GAA
Denis DeJordy	53	2981	22	22	7	156	2	3.14
Dave Dryden	30	1479	11	11	2	79	3	3.20
Jack Norris	3	100	1	0	0	10	0	6.00

== Draft picks ==
Chicago's draft picks at the 1968 NHL amateur draft held at the Queen Elizabeth Hotel in Montreal, Quebec.

Round	#	Player	Nationality	College/Junior/Club team (League)
1	9	John Marks	Canada	University of North Dakota (NCAA)

== Sources ==
- Hockey-Reference
- Rauzulu's Street
- Goalies Archive
- HockeyDB
- National Hockey League Guide & Record Book 2007
