= Wayne Maxner =

Canadian ice hockey player (1942–2023)

- Born: September 27, 1942 Halifax, Nova Scotia, Canada
- Died: July 27, 2023 (aged 80) Clinton, Ontario, Canada
- Height: 5 ft 11 in (180 cm)
- Weight: 170 lb (77 kg; 12 st 2 lb)
- Position: Left wing
- Shot: Left
- Played for: Boston Bruins
- Playing career: 1963–1973

Wayne Douglas Maxner (September 27, 1942 – July 27, 2023) was a Canadian ice hockey player for the Boston Bruins of the National Hockey League (NHL) during the 1960s.

== Career ==
Maxner led the Ontario Hockey Association junior A league in scoring in 1962–63 as a member of the Niagara Falls Flyers and won the Eddie Powers Memorial Trophy as league MVP. He played 54 games for the Bruins in 1964–65, and eight more the following season. He bounced around the American, Western, and Eastern Hockey Leagues until retiring in 1973. In 62 NHL games, Maxner scored eight goals and nine assists. His first NHL goal occurred on December 5, 1964, in Boston's 3–3 tie versus the New York Rangers at Boston Garden. He recorded 48 penalties in minutes.

Following his retirement as a player, Maxner served as the head coach of several teams, primarily the Windsor Spitfires and London Knights of the Ontario Hockey League. He briefly coached the Detroit Red Wings for parts of two seasons between 1980 and 1982, finishing with an NHL record of 129 games coached and a 34–68–27 record.

== Death ==
Wayne Maxner died on July 27, 2023, at the age of 80.

== Career statistics ==
=== Regular season and playoffs ===
			Regular season					Playoffs
Season	Team	League	GP	G	A	Pts	PIM	GP	G	A	Pts	PIM
1959–60	Barrie Colts	WOJHL	—	—	—	—	—	—	—	—	—	—
1959–60	Barrie Flyers	OHA	—	—	—	—	—	3	1	0	1	0
1960–61	Barrie Colts	WOJHL	—	—	—	—	—	—	—	—	—	—
1961–62	Niagara Falls Flyers	OHA	28	14	15	29	38	10	7	4	11	4
1962–63	Niagara Falls Flyers	OHA	50	32	62	94	48	7	11	3	14	6
1962–63	Niagara Falls Flyers	M-Cup	—	—	—	—	—	16	15	20	35	4
1963–64	Minneapolis Bruins	CPHL	70	27	29	56	44	5	2	1	3	0
1964–65	Boston Bruins	NHL	54	7	6	13	42	—	—	—	—	—
1964–65	Minneapolis Bruins	CPHL	16	8	11	19	20	—	—	—	—	—
1965–66	Boston Bruins	NHL	8	1	3	4	6	—	—	—	—	—
1965–66	San Francisco Seals	WHL	60	20	20	40	50	5	1	1	2	0
1966–67	California Seals	WHL	67	25	35	60	54	6	0	2	2	0
1967–68	Hershey Bears	AHL	54	13	20	33	16	2	0	0	0	2
1969–70	Long Island Ducks	EHL	64	41	41	82	30	—	—	—	—	—
1970–71	Montréal Voyageurs	AHL	4	0	0	0	0	—	—	—	—	—
1970–71	Long Island Ducks	EHL	64	44	43	87	12	—	—	—	—	—
1971–72	Gander Flyers	NSHL	36	52	59	111	10	8	7	10	17	2
1972–73	HYS The Hague	NED	10	21	19	40	—	—	—	—	—	—
1972–73	Long Island Ducks	EHL	35	19	39	58	2	—	—	—	—	—
1972–73	Springfield Indians	AHL	4	0	1	1	2	—	—	—	—	—
EHL totals			163	104	123	227	44	—	—	—	—	—
NHL totals			62	8	9	17	48	—	—	—	—	—

== NHL coaching record ==
Team	Year	Regular season						Postseason
Team	Year	G	W	L	T	Pts	Finish	Result
Detroit Red Wings	1980-81	60	16	29	15	(56)	5th in Norris	Missed playoffs
Detroit Red Wings	1981-82	69	18	39	12	(54)	6th in Norris	Missed playoffs
Total		129	34	66	27			

Preceded by Ted Lindsay	Head coach of the Detroit Red Wings; 1980–82	Succeeded by Billy Dea
