= Bill Knibbs =

Canadian ice hockey player

- Born: January 24, 1942 Toronto, Ontario, Canada
- Died: September 16, 2006 (aged 64)
- Height: 6 ft 0 in (183 cm)
- Weight: 175 lb (79 kg; 12 st 7 lb)
- Position: Centre
- Shot: Left
- Played for: Boston Bruins
- Playing career: 1962–1975

William Arthur Knibbs (born January 24, 1942 – September 16, 2006) was a Canadian professional ice hockey player who played 53 games in the National Hockey League with the Boston Bruins during the 1964–65 season. The rest of his career, which lasted from 1962 to 1975, was mainly spent in the American Hockey League.

Knibbs scored seven goals for Boston in his lone NHL season. His first goal occurred on December 16, 1964 in the Bruins' 7-5 loss to the Chicago Blackhawks at Chicago Stadium.

== Career statistics ==
=== Regular season and playoffs ===
			Regular season					Playoffs
Season	Team	League	GP	G	A	Pts	PIM	GP	G	A	Pts	PIM
1959–60	Barrie Flyers	OHA	48	14	25	39	29	6	2	1	3	19
1960–61	Niagara Falls Flyers	OHA	48	22	35	57	31	7	4	1	5	2
1961–62	Niagara Falls Flyers	OHA	50	28	34	62	19	10	2	4	6	5
1961–62	Kingston Frontenacs	EPHL	1	0	0	0	0	7	1	2	3	0
1962–63	Kingston Frontenacs	EPHL	69	22	25	47	8	5	0	1	1	5
1963–64	Minneapolis Bruins	CHL	72	29	36	65	12	5	0	3	3	0
1964–65	Boston Bruins	NHL	53	7	10	17	4	—	—	—	—	—
1964–65	Minneapolis Bruins	CHL	16	11	8	19	10	—	—	—	—	—
1965–66	Baltimore Clippers	AHL	71	21	17	38	18	—	—	—	—	—
1966–67	Baltimore Clippers	AHL	70	16	17	33	24	9	2	2	4	4
1967–68	Buffalo Bisons	AHL	49	13	27	40	21	5	3	0	3	2
1968–69	Buffalo Bisons	AHL	68	13	38	51	38	6	2	3	5	0
1969–70	Buffalo Bisons	AHL	69	17	43	60	18	8	1	4	5	10
1970–71	Seattle Totems	WHL	39	14	17	31	4	—	—	—	—	—
1970–71	Omaha Knights	CHL	19	10	22	32	70	11	2	9	11	2
1971–72	Providence Reds	AHL	76	13	33	46	34	5	0	2	2	2
1972–73	Providence Reds	AHL	67	17	39	56	32	4	0	1	1	0
1973–74	Rochester Americans	AHL	38	9	25	34	6	—	—	—	—	—
1974–75	Rochester Americans	AHL	44	8	17	25	14	7	1	1	2	4
AHL totals			552	127	256	383	205	44	9	13	22	22
NHL totals			53	7	10	17	4	—	—	—	—	—
