= Jeannot Gilbert =

Canadian ice hockey player (1940–2026)

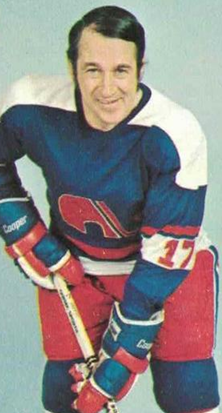
- Gilbert in 1973 photo
- Born: December 29, 1940 La Baie, Quebec, Canada
- Died: November 2, 2026 (aged 85) La Baie, Quebec, Canada
- Height: 5 ft 10 in (178 cm)
- Weight: 175 lb (79 kg; 12 st 7 lb)
- Position: Centre
- Shot: Left
- Played for: Boston Bruins (NHL); Providence Reds (AHL); Hershey Bears (AHL); Quebec Nordiques (WHA)
- Playing career: 1959–1975

Jeannot Gilbert (December 29, 1940 – November 2, 2026) was a Canadian professional ice hockey forward who played 9 games in the National Hockey League for the Boston Bruins between 1963 and 1965. He also played 133 games in the World Hockey Association with the Quebec Nordiques between 1973 and 1975. The rest of his career, which lasted from 1960 to 1975, was mainly spent in the American Hockey League.

== Playing career ==
Gilbert played junior with the Barrie Flyers and Niagara Falls Flyers of the Ontario Hockey Association from 1959 to 1961. He made his professional debut during the 1960–61 season, playing one game with the Kingston Frontenacs of the Eastern Professional Hockey League. He spent the next two seasons with Kingston, though most of the 1961–62 season was spent with the Clinton Comets of the Eastern Hockey League. On March 14, 1963, Gilbert made his NHL debut with the Boston Bruins, playing against the Chicago Black Hawks. He played five games with the Bruins that season. Gilbert then played one season, 1963–64 season with the Minneapolis Bruins of the Central Professional Hockey League.

He played a further four games for Boston in 1964–65, but the bulk of the season was spent with their American Hockey League (AHL) affiliate the Providence Reds. He moved to the Hershey Bears of the AHL in 1965 and played eight seasons there. In the 1967 NHL Expansion Draft, Gilbert was selected by the Pittsburgh Penguins, but never played for them. In 1973, he joined the Quebec Nordiques of the World Hockey Association and played two seasons there before retiring in 1975.

== Death ==
Jeannot Gilbert died on November 2, 2026, at the age of 85.

== Career statistics ==
=== Regular season and playoffs ===
			Regular season					Playoffs
Season	Team	League	GP	G	A	Pts	PIM	GP	G	A	Pts	PIM
1959–60	Barrie Flyers	OHA	44	28	36	64	28	6	2	5	7	0
1960–61	Niagara Falls Flyers	OHA	48	36	28	64	21	7	2	8	10	0
1960–61	Kingston Frontenacs	EPHL	1	0	1	1	0	—	—	—	—	—
1961–62	Clinton Comets	EHL	67	38	51	89	33	6	4	1	5	0
1961–62	Kingston Frontenacs	EPHL	5	1	2	3	0	3	2	0	2	0
1962–63	Kingston Frontenacs	EPHL	64	34	53	87	25	5	1	6	7	2
1962–63	Boston Bruins	NHL	5	0	0	0	4	—	—	—	—	—
1963–64	Minneapolis Bruins	CHL	72	50	50	100	18	5	4	1	5	2
1964–65	Providence Reds	AHL	64	25	30	55	16	—	—	—	—	—
1964–65	Boston Bruins	NHL	4	0	1	1	0	—	—	—	—	—
1965–66	Hershey Bears	AHL	69	20	51	71	13	3	0	2	2	0
1966–67	Hershey Bears	AHL	72	26	57	83	48	5	0	2	2	0
1967–68	Hershey Bears	AHL	72	28	47	75	24	5	1	1	2	0
1968–69	Hershey Bears	AHL	71	35	65	100	13	11	3	3	6	10
1969–70	Hershey Bears	AHL	67	23	41	64	8	7	2	6	8	2
1970–71	Hershey Bears	AHL	56	14	28	42	8	4	0	2	2	4
1971–72	Hershey Bears	AHL	74	29	42	71	24	4	0	1	1	0
1972–73	Hershey Bears	AHL	71	31	58	89	8	7	3	8	11	2
1973–74	Quebec Nordiques	WHA	75	17	39	56	20	—	—	—	—	—
1974–75	Quebec Nordiques	WHA	58	7	21	28	12	11	3	6	9	2
WHA totals			133	24	60	84	32	11	3	6	9	2
NHL totals			9	0	1	1	4	—	—	—	—	—

Preceded by None	CPHL Most Valuable Player Award; 1963–64	Succeeded by Cesare Maniago
