= Pat Graham (ice hockey) =

Canadian ice hockey player (1961–2026)

- Born: May 25, 1961 Toronto, Ontario, Canada
- Died: May 4, 2026 (aged 64)
- Height: 6 ft 1 in (185 cm)
- Weight: 190 lb (86 kg; 13 st 8 lb)
- Position: Left wing
- Shot: Left
- Played for: Pittsburgh Penguins; Toronto Maple Leafs
- NHL draft: 114th overall, 1980; Pittsburgh Penguins
- Playing career: 1981–1985

Patrick Thomas Graham (May 25, 1961 – May 4, 2026) was a Canadian ice hockey player. He played 103 games in the National Hockey League with the Pittsburgh Penguins and Toronto Maple Leafs between 1981 and 1984.

Graham was forced to retire from hockey due to chronic back problems. Following his retirement he earned his chiropractic degree and began working with the Toronto Blue Jays. In 2010, Graham opened his own chiropractic clinic with Dr. Sean Fletch, a former Guelph University football player.

Graham died at his home at the age of 64, on May 4, 2026.

== Career statistics ==
=== Regular season and playoffs ===
			Regular season					Playoffs
Season	Team	League	GP	G	A	Pts	PIM	GP	G	A	Pts	PIM
1977–78	Toronto Marlboros	OMJHL	50	5	6	11	41	—	—	—	—	—
1978–79	Toronto Marlboros	OMJHL	49	10	12	22	102	—	—	—	—	—
1979–80	Toronto Marlboros	OMJHL	2	1	0	1	16	—	—	—	—	—
1979–80	Niagara Falls Flyers	OMJHL	59	31	32	63	73	—	—	—	—	—
1980–81	Niagara Falls Flyers	OHL	61	40	54	94	118	—	—	—	—	—
1981–82	Erie Blades	AHL	9	4	4	8	4	—	—	—	—	—
1981–82	Pittsburgh Penguins	NHL	42	6	8	14	55	4	0	0	0	2
1982–83	Baltimore Skipjacks	AHL	57	16	16	32	32	—	—	—	—	—
1982–83	Pittsburgh Penguins	NHL	20	1	5	6	16	—	—	—	—	—
1983–84	St. Catharines Saints	AHL	25	7	7	14	18	7	1	2	3	9
1983–84	Toronto Maple Leafs	NHL	41	4	4	8	65	—	—	—	—	—
1984–85	Adirondack Red Wings	AHL	27	5	5	10	19	—	—	—	—	—
1984–85	Braunlage EC	GER-2	24	12	8	20	57	—	—	—	—	—
1985–86	Flamboro Mott's Clamato's	OHA Sr	18	6	18	24	25	—	—	—	—	—
NHL totals			103	11	17	28	136	4	0	0	0	2
