= Jim Jackson (ice hockey) =

- Born: February 1, 1960 (age 66) Oshawa, Ontario, Canada
- Height: 5 ft 10 in (178 cm)
- Weight: 180 lb (82 kg; 12 st 12 lb)
- Position: Right wing
- Shot: Right
- Played for: Calgary Flames; Buffalo Sabres
- NHL draft: Undrafted
- Playing career: 1976–1990

James Kenneth Jackson (born February 1, 1960) is a Canadian former professional ice hockey right winger. He played for the Calgary Flames and the Buffalo Sabres of the National Hockey League between 1982 and 1988. He later coached the Markham Thunder of the Canadian Women's Hockey League.

== Early life ==
Jackson was born to Ralph (Curly) Kenneth Jackson and Joan Thérèse Melvina Jackson (née Cardinal) in Oshawa, Ontario. He was the third of four children. Jackson started skating at the age of two, and his constructed a wooden frame in preparation for packing and flooding their large backyard rink every autumn.

As a youth, Jackson played in the 1972 and 1973 Quebec International Pee-Wee Hockey Tournaments with a minor ice hockey team from Oshawa.

Jackson played four years of junior hockey with the Oshawa Generals and the Niagara Falls Flyers of the Ontario Major Junior Hockey League between 1976 and 1980. He turned professional in 1980 when he joined the Richmond Rifles of the Eastern Hockey League. He moved to the Muskegon Mohawks of the International Hockey League the next season. The next 3 seasons were spent with the Calgary Flames of the National Hockey League (NHL), as well as with their minor league affiliates in Colorado and Moncton. In 1985, the Buffalo Sabres assigned Jim to the Rochester Americans of the American Hockey League.In 112 NHL games, Jim scored 17 goals and 47 points. With Rochester, he scored 93 goals and 205 assists in 360 games.

In 2001, Jackson was inducted into Rochester Americans Hockey Hall of Fame. The following year, he was inducted into the Oshawa Sports Hall of Fame. In 1990, Jackson retired as a hockey player.

== Awards ==
- Calder Cup Champion, Rochester Americans 1986-87
- Rochester Americans Hockey Hall of Fame, inducted 2001
- Oshawa Sports Hall of Fame, inducted 2002

== Career statistics ==
=== Regular season and playoffs ===
			Regular season					Playoffs
Season	Team	League	GP	G	A	Pts	PIM	GP	G	A	Pts	PIM
1975–76	Parkway AAA Selects	OMHA U16	77	47	55	102	50	—	—	—	—	—
1976–77	Oshawa Generals	OMJHL	65	13	40	53	26	—	—	—	—	—
1977–78	Oshawa Generals	OMJHL	68	33	47	80	60	6	2	2	4	26
1978–79	Niagara Falls Flyers	OMJHL	62	26	39	65	73	20	6	9	15	16
1979–80	Niagara Falls Flyers	OMJHL	66	29	57	86	55	10	7	8	15	8
1980–81	Richmond Rifles	EHL	58	17	43	60	42	10	1	0	1	4
1981–82	Muskegon Mohawks	IHL	82	24	51	75	72	—	—	—	—	—
1982–83	Calgary Flames	NHL	48	8	12	20	7	8	2	1	3	2
1982–83	Colorado Flames	CHL	30	10	16	26	4	—	—	—	—	—
1983–84	Calgary Flames	NHL	49	6	14	20	13	6	1	1	2	4
1983–84	Colorado Flames	CHL	25	5	27	32	4	—	—	—	—	—
1984–85	Calgary Flames	NHL	10	1	4	5	0	—	—	—	—	—
1984–85	Moncton Golden Flames	AHL	24	2	5	7	6	—	—	—	—	—
1985–86	Rochester Americans	AHL	65	16	32	48	10	—	—	—	—	—
1986–87	Rochester Americans	AHL	71	19	38	57	48	16	5	4	9	6
1987–88	Buffalo Sabres	NHL	5	2	0	2	0	—	—	—	—	—
1987–88	Rochester Americans	AHL	74	23	48	71	23	7	2	6	8	4
1988–89	Rochester Americans	AHL	73	19	50	69	14	—	—	—	—	—
1989–90	Rochester Americans	AHL	77	16	37	53	14	9	1	5	6	4
NHL totals			112	17	30	47	20	14	3	2	5	6

- Source: NHL.com
