= Ron Schock =

Canadian ice hockey player

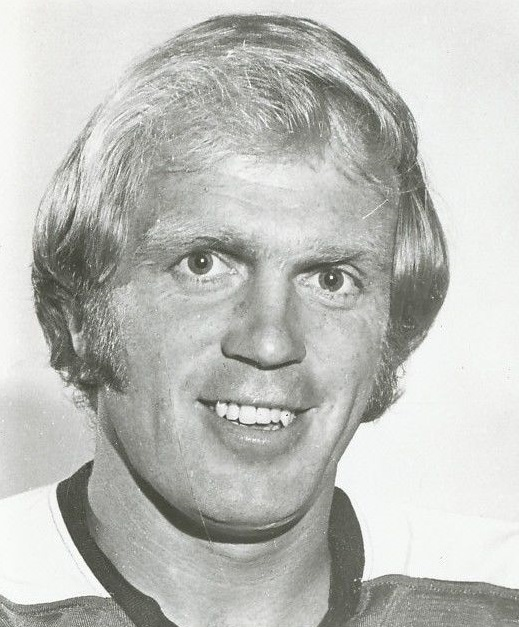
- Schock in 1973
- Born: December 19, 1943 (age 82) Chapleau, Ontario, Canada
- Height: 5 ft 10 in (178 cm)
- Weight: 170 lb (77 kg; 12 st 2 lb)
- Position: Centre
- Shot: Left
- Played for: Pittsburgh Penguins; Boston Bruins; St. Louis Blues; Buffalo Sabres
- Playing career: 1963–1980

Ronald Lawrence Schock (born December 19, 1943) is a Canadian former professional ice hockey centre who played in the National Hockey League from 1964 to 1978. His younger brother, Danny Schock, also played briefly in the NHL. Schock retired following 909 games, recording a total of 166 goals, 351 assists, and 517 points.

== Playing career ==
Schock scored his first NHL goal as a member of the Boston Bruins on February 29, 1964. It came in his team's 2-1 victory over the Detroit Red Wings at Boston Garden.

While playing with the St. Louis Blues, Schock attended a hockey dinner and was asked where he would least like to be traded. He responded, either the New York Rangers or Pittsburgh Penguins. Two days later he was traded to the Pittsburgh Penguins.

Ron Schock is perhaps most famous for his double overtime "Midnight Goal" that won game 7 for the Blues over the Minnesota North Stars on May 3, 1968, and sent the Blues to the Stanley Cup finals in the first year of the NHL expansion. Arguably, this was a major contribution to the early popularity of the St. Louis Blues franchise.

== Career statistics ==
=== Regular season and playoffs ===
			Regular season					Playoffs
Season	Team	League	GP	G	A	Pts	PIM	GP	G	A	Pts	PIM
1961–62	Niagara Falls Flyers	OHA	50	18	27	45	17	10	1	7	8	6
1962–63	Niagara Falls Flyers	OHA	46	23	48	71	66	9	5	11	16	19
1962–63	Kingston Frontenacs	EPHL	1	0	1	1	0	—	—	—	—	—
1962–63	Niagara Falls Flyers	M-Cup	—	—	—	—	—	7	4	4	8	4
1963–64	Niagara Falls Flyers	OHA	44	38	36	74	30	4	2	1	3	2
1963–64	Boston Bruins	NHL	5	1	2	3	0	—	—	—	—	—
1963–64	Minneapolis Bruins	CPHL	—	—	—	—	—	2	0	3	3	0
1964–65	Boston Bruins	NHL	33	4	7	11	14	—	—	—	—	—
1965–66	San Francisco Seals	WHL	43	11	21	32	28	7	1	5	6	6
1965–66	Boston Bruins	NHL	24	2	2	4	6	—	—	—	—	—
1966–67	Boston Bruins	NHL	66	10	20	30	8	—	—	—	—	—
1967–68	Kansas City Blues	CPHL	10	2	8	10	2	—	—	—	—	—
1967–68	St. Louis Blues	NHL	55	9	9	18	17	12	1	2	3	0
1968–69	St. Louis Blues	NHL	67	12	27	39	14	12	1	2	3	6
1969–70	Pittsburgh Penguins	NHL	76	8	21	29	40	10	1	6	7	7
1970–71	Pittsburgh Penguins	NHL	71	14	26	40	20	—	—	—	—	—
1971–72	Pittsburgh Penguins	NHL	77	17	29	46	22	4	1	0	1	6
1972–73	Pittsburgh Penguins	NHL	78	13	36	49	23	—	—	—	—	—
1973–74	Pittsburgh Penguins	NHL	77	14	29	43	22	—	—	—	—	—
1974–75	Pittsburgh Penguins	NHL	80	23	63	86	36	9	0	4	4	10
1975–76	Pittsburgh Penguins	NHL	80	18	44	62	28	3	0	1	1	0
1976–77	Pittsburgh Penguins	NHL	80	17	32	49	10	3	0	1	1	0
1977–78	Buffalo Sabres	NHL	40	4	4	8	0	2	0	0	0	0
1978–79	Hershey Bears	AHL	79	21	45	66	21	4	0	2	2	0
1979–80	Rochester Americans	AHL	40	10	18	28	12	—	—	—	—	—
NHL totals			909	166	351	517	260	55	4	16	20	29

Preceded by Earl Ingarfield	Pittsburgh Penguins captain 1973–77	Succeeded by Jean Pronovost
