= Cesare Maniago =

Canadian ice hockey player

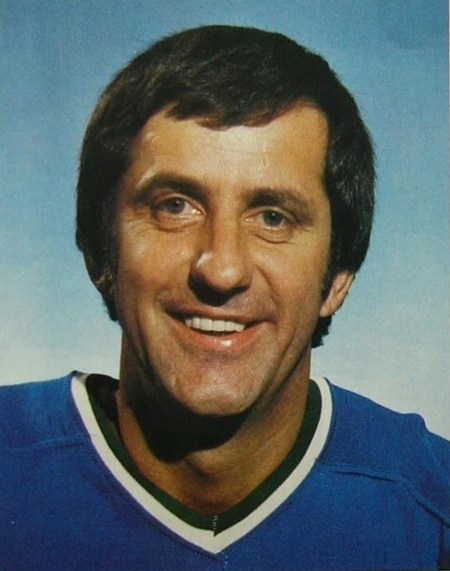
- Maniago in 1976 photo
- Born: January 13, 1939 (age 87) Trail, British Columbia, Canada
- Height: 6 ft 3 in (191 cm)
- Weight: 195 lb (88 kg; 13 st 13 lb)
- Position: Goaltender
- Caught: Left
- Played for: Toronto Maple Leafs; Montreal Canadiens; New York Rangers; Minnesota North Stars; Vancouver Canucks
- Playing career: 1960–1978

Cesare Maniago (/ˈsiːzər/ SEE-zər; born January 13, 1939) is a Canadian former professional ice hockey goaltender who played 410 of his 568 National Hockey League (NHL) games for the Minnesota North Stars, the second most in franchise history.

== Playing career ==
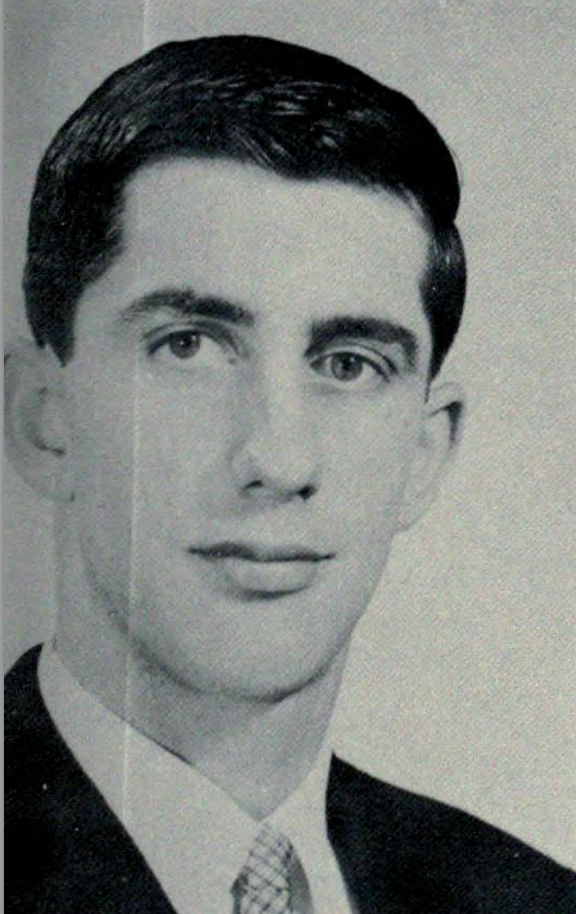
Maniago, c. 1958 at St. Michaels College

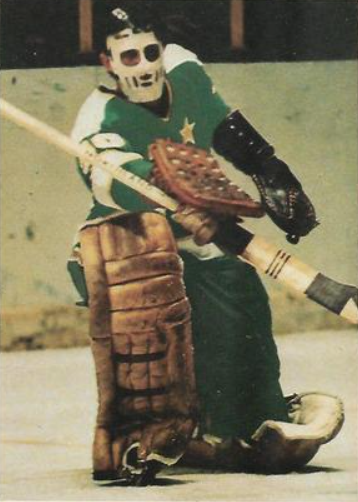
Maniago in 1971 action shot for Minnesota North Stars

Originally the property of the Toronto Maple Leafs, the young goalie played seven games for the Leafs in the 1960–61 season. Picked up by the Montreal Canadiens in the inter-league draft the following season, Maniago underwent a lengthy apprenticeship in the minor leagues, spending the better part of five years on the farm. The high point of his years with Montreal was a 14-game stint in relief of the ailing Jacques Plante during the 1963 season. He had a sparkling season for the Minneapolis Bruins of the Central Hockey League in 1965, winning the league's most valuable player award, after which he was dealt to the New York Rangers.

Maniago competed against Ed Giacomin and Don Simmons for the starting goal position in 1966, playing 28 games for the last-place team. On March 12, in Chicago, he allowed the Black Hawks' star left winger Bobby Hull's 51st goal of the season, the first time in league history that any player had scored more than 50 goals in one year. After the game, he insisted that Chicago's crafty forward Eric Nesterenko had interfered with him during the play: "Nesterenko lifted the blade of my stick, and the puck went under it."

Giacomin firmly won the job the next season as the much-improved Rangers made the playoffs, and Maniago played in just six games as his backup.

=== Minnesota ===
With expansion arriving the next season, Maniago had his opportunity. He was the first draft choice of the expansion Minnesota North Stars on June 6, 1967, immediately becoming their number one goaltender, a job he kept for the next nine seasons. His play led the North Stars into the playoffs in five of their first six seasons. In his first season with the North Stars, he had career highs in wins and shutouts while leading underdog Minnesota into the 1967-68 West Division semi-finals. The North Stars struggled the next season, finishing in last place and missing the playoffs.

Unable to find a suitable goalie to help Maniago with the workload (the other goalies the team tried went a combined 11-35-16 in Minnesota's first three seasons) the North Stars obtained Gump Worsley's rights from the Canadiens on February 27, 1970, talking him out of retirement in 1970. The late-season addition rejuvenated the struggling team, who finished strongly, ending up in third place. Over the next three seasons, the tandem led the North Stars into the playoffs, including an appearance against Montreal in the 1971 semifinals. In this series, Minnesota was the first expansion team to defeat an Original Six team in a playoff game, beating the Canadiens twice.

Starting in 1974, the fortunes of the Minnesota club sagged, as did Maniago's play. Worsley's retirement that season left him as the sole experienced goalie on the struggling team. After the 1976 season, he was traded to the Vancouver Canucks for Gary "Suitcase" Smith on August 23, 1976, where Cesare played for his two final seasons.

== Legacy ==
In retirement, Maniago was involved in the wholesale sporting goods business, but later became the goaltending coach for the Canucks.

Maniago retired with 190 wins in 568 games, recording 30 shutouts and a career 3.27 goals against average, leading Minnesota goaltenders in every meaningful statistical category.

At the time of his retirement, Maniago was in the top 25 in NHL history in shutouts, fifth in all-time losses and twelfth in all-time games played.

Maniago remains third in all-time games played and minutes played in net for the Minnesota/Dallas franchise behind Marty Turco and Kari Lehtonen, and third in shutouts to Ed Belfour and Turco, and fifth in wins.

== Career statistics ==
Bold indicates led league

			Regular season									Playoffs
Season	Team	League	GP	W	L	T	MIN	GA	SO	GAA	SV%	GP	W	L	T	MIN	GA	SO	GAA	SV%
1957–58	St. Michael's Majors	OHA-Jr.	48	21	19	7	2880	173	2	3.60	—	—	—	—	—	—	—	—	—	—
1958–59	St. Michael's Majors	OHA-Jr.	42	—	—	—	2520	131	4	3.12	—	—	—	—	—	—	—	—	—	—
1959–60	Kitchener-Waterloo Dutchmen	OHA-Sr.	38	—	—	—	2240	149	0	3.99	—	—	—	—	—	—	—	—	—	—
1959–60	Chatham Maroons	Al-Cup	—	—	—	—	—	—	—	—	—	14	10	3	1	850	40	3	2.82	—
1960–61	Toronto Maple Leafs	NHL	7	4	2	1	420	17	0	2.43	.928	2	1	1	—	145	6	0	2.48	.905
1960–61	Sudbury Wolves	EPHL	11	7	3	1	660	19	3	1.73	—	—	—	—	—	—	—	—	—	—
1960–61	Vancouver Canucks	WHL	2	2	0	0	120	5	0	2.50	—	—	—	—	—	—	—	—	—	—
1960–61	Spokane Comets	WHL	30	17	10	3	1800	90	1	3.00	—	4	1	3	—	240	19	0	4.75	—
1961–62	Hull-Ottawa Canadiens	EPHL	68	37	21	10	4080	168	3	2.47	—	13	8	5	—	823	32	0	2.33	—
1962–63	Montreal Canadiens	NHL	14	5	5	4	820	42	0	3.07	.897	—	—	—	—	—	—	—	—	—
1962–63	Quebec Aces	AHL	5	2	3	0	300	19	0	3.80	—	—	—	—	—	—	—	—	—	—
1962–63	Spokane Comets	WHL	1	0	1	0	60	4	0	4.00	—	—	—	—	—	—	—	—	—	—
1962–63	Hull-Ottawa Canadiens	EPHL	28	13	11	4	1680	86	1	3.07	—	3	0	3	—	185	9	0	2.92	—
1963–64	Buffalo Bisons	AHL	27	11	13	1	1630	103	0	3.79	—	—	—	—	—	—	—	—	—	—
1963–64	Omaha Knights	CPHL	2	2	2	360	23	0	3.83	—	—	—	—	—	—	—	—	—	—	—
1964–65	Minneapolis Bruins	CPHL	67	34	26	7	4020	184	6	2.75	—	5	1	4	—	300	19	1	3.80	—
1965–66	New York Rangers	NHL	28	9	14	4	1613	94	2	3.50	.895	—	—	—	—	—	—	—	—	—
1965–66	Baltimore Clippers	AHL	27	11	16	0	1572	83	1	3.17	—	—	—	—	—	—	—	—	—	—
1966–67	New York Rangers	NHL	6	0	1	1	219	14	0	3.84	.863	—	—	—	—	—	—	—	—
1967–68	Minnesota North Stars	NHL	52	22	16	9	2876	133	6	2.77	.913	14	7	7	—	895	39	0	2.61	.918
1968–69	Minnesota North Stars	NHL	64	18	**34**	10	3599	**198**	1	3.30	.905	—	—	—	—	—	—	—	—	—
1969–70	Minnesota North Stars	NHL	50	9	24	16	2887	163	2	3.39	.908	3	1	2	—	180	6	1	2.00	.941
1970–71	Minnesota North Stars	NHL	40	19	15	6	2380	107	5	2.70	.914	8	3	5	—	480	28	0	3.50	.896
1971–72	Minnesota North Stars	NHL	43	20	17	4	2539	112	3	2.65	.919	4	1	3	—	238	12	0	3.03	.906
1972–73	Minnesota North Stars	NHL	47	21	18	6	2736	132	5	2.89	.910	5	2	3	—	309	9	2	1.75	.939
1973–74	Minnesota North Stars	NHL	40	12	18	10	2378	138	1	3.48	.898	—	—	—	—	—	—	—	—	—
1974–75	Minnesota North Stars	NHL	37	11	21	4	2129	149	1	4.20	.881	—	—	—	—	—	—	—	—	—
1975–76	Minnesota North Stars	NHL	47	13	27	5	2704	151	2	3.36	.901	—	—	—	—	—	—	—	—	—
1976–77	Vancouver Canucks	NHL	47	17	21	9	2699	151	1	3.36	.894	—	—	—	—	—	—	—	—	—
1977–78	Vancouver Canucks	NHL	46	10	24	8	2570	172	1	4.02	.870	—	—	—	—	—	—	—	—	—
NHL totals			568	190	257	97	32,569	1773	30	3.27	.902	36	15	21	—	2247	100	3	2.67	.916

"Maniago's stats". The Goaltender Home Page.

Preceded by Jeannot Gilbert	CPHL Most Valuable Player Award; 1964–65	Succeeded by Art Stratton
