= J. P. Parisé =

Canadian ice hockey player, coach (1941–2015)

- Parisé with the New York Islanders in 1976
- Born: December 11, 1941 Smooth Rock Falls, Ontario, Canada
- Died: January 7, 2015 (aged 73) Prior Lake, Minnesota, U.S.
- Height: 5 ft 9 in (175 cm)
- Weight: 180 lb (82 kg; 12 st 12 lb)
- Position: Left wing
- Shot: Left
- Played for: Boston Bruins; Toronto Maple Leafs; Minnesota North Stars; New York Islanders; Cleveland Barons
- National team: Canada
- Playing career: 1963–1979

Jean-Paul Joseph-Louis Parisé (December 11, 1941 – January 7, 2015) was a Canadian professional ice hockey coach and player. Parisé played in the National Hockey League (NHL), most notably for the Minnesota North Stars and the New York Islanders.

== Playing career ==
=== Juniors and minor leagues ===
Parisé was signed by the Boston Bruins at 21, after a scout saw Parisé score four goals and two assists in a playoff-clinching game, and was assigned in to the Bruins' junior league club, the Niagara Falls Flyers of the Ontario Hockey Association. On the Flyers, he played for former NHL player and future Bruins general manager Hap Emms. While he was not a promising scorer in juniors, he learned to play a diligent two-way game and became noted as a skilled penalty killer. He turned professional the following season and, in the days of the Original Six when big league jobs were few, spent most of the next five seasons in the Bruins' farm system. He started to find his scoring touch in 1964 with the Minneapolis Bruins of the Central Professional Hockey League, scoring 63 points in 72 games, and was named a Second Team league All-Star with the Bruins' Oklahoma City Blazers affiliate in 1966.

=== Boston Bruins ===
He made his NHL debut the same season with the Boston Bruins, playing limited action in three games, followed by eighteen games the next season.

=== Minnesota North Stars ===
The following season saw expansion, and Parisé was drafted by the California Seals on June 6, 1967. On October 12, he was traded to the Toronto Maple Leafs for Bryan Hextall Jr. and Gerry Ehman and assigned to the Rochester Americans of the American Hockey League. He played 30 games for the Americans (and one for the Leafs), before being dealt again on December 23, this time to the Minnesota North Stars along with Milan Marcetta for Murray Hall, Ted Taylor, Len Lunde, Don Johns, Duke Harris, and the loan of Carl Wetzel.

Playing on a line with center Jude Drouin and high scoring right winger Bill Goldsworthy, Parisé finally became a star, playing six seasons and parts of two others in Minnesota. He was named twice to play in the NHL All-Star Game, and had his best professional season in 1972–73, when he scored 27 goals and 75 points.

=== Team Canada ===
The degree to which Parisé was held in respect in the hockey world resulted in being named to play for Team Canada in the Summit Series in 1972. He was a surprise pick to the team and didn't expect to see much ice time, but ended up playing in six of the eight games. He played on a line with superstar Phil Esposito and had two goals and two assists.

Parisé was best known in the series for nearly attacking West German referee Josef Kompalla with his stick in the eighth game after Kompalla had handed out a series of questionable penalties against the Canadians. Parisé held back at the last minute from striking Kompalla and was ejected from the game in consequence. As a silver lining, the officiating of the game improved considerably after Parisé's threat which allowed his teammates a chance to get back in the game.

=== New York Islanders ===
At age 34, the North Stars felt that Parisé was aging, and dealt him to the New York Islanders midway through the 1975 season for Doug Rombough and Ernie Hicke. He then went on to be one of the key players to not only lead the Islanders to their first playoff berth that season but all the way to the Stanley Cup semifinals, where the Islanders lost in a hard-fought seven game series to the eventual Cup champion Philadelphia Flyers. Parisé had 16 points in 17 playoff games that year, second to former North Stars teammate Drouin, who had been acquired in a separate deal with Minnesota that season. Parisé played two and a half more seasons on Long Island, adding over 20 goals each of his full seasons and providing excellent defensive play.

=== Cleveland and Minnesota ===
Halfway through the 1978 season, Parisé was traded to the Cleveland Barons along with Jean Potvin for Wayne Merrick, Darcy Regier, and Cleveland's fourth-round choice in the upcoming 1978 draft. After the demise of the Barons and their June 5 merger draft with the Minnesota franchise, Parisé became a North Star again and he would serve as the team's captain while playing his final season before retirement.

In total, Parisé played 890 games in the NHL (leading the league in games played in three seasons), scoring 238 goals and 356 assists for 594 points, adding 706 penalty minutes. He also had 27 goals and 31 assists in 86 playoff games.

== Post-playing career ==
After his retirement, he served as a coach in the North Stars' organization, as assistant coach between 1980 and 1988, except for the 1984 season, when he was the head coach for Minnesota's minor league affiliate, the Salt Lake Golden Eagles of the Central Hockey League; he recorded a 35–35–2 mark as coach. Thereafter Parisé retired to Minnesota where he coached and was hockey director at Shattuck-Saint Mary's, where his son Zach Parise and many other players such as Sidney Crosby, Jack Johnson and Jonathan Toews played.

On April 23, 2008, Parisé was named the head coach and general manager of the Des Moines Buccaneers of the United States Hockey League. He served one season as the team's coach.

== Personal life ==
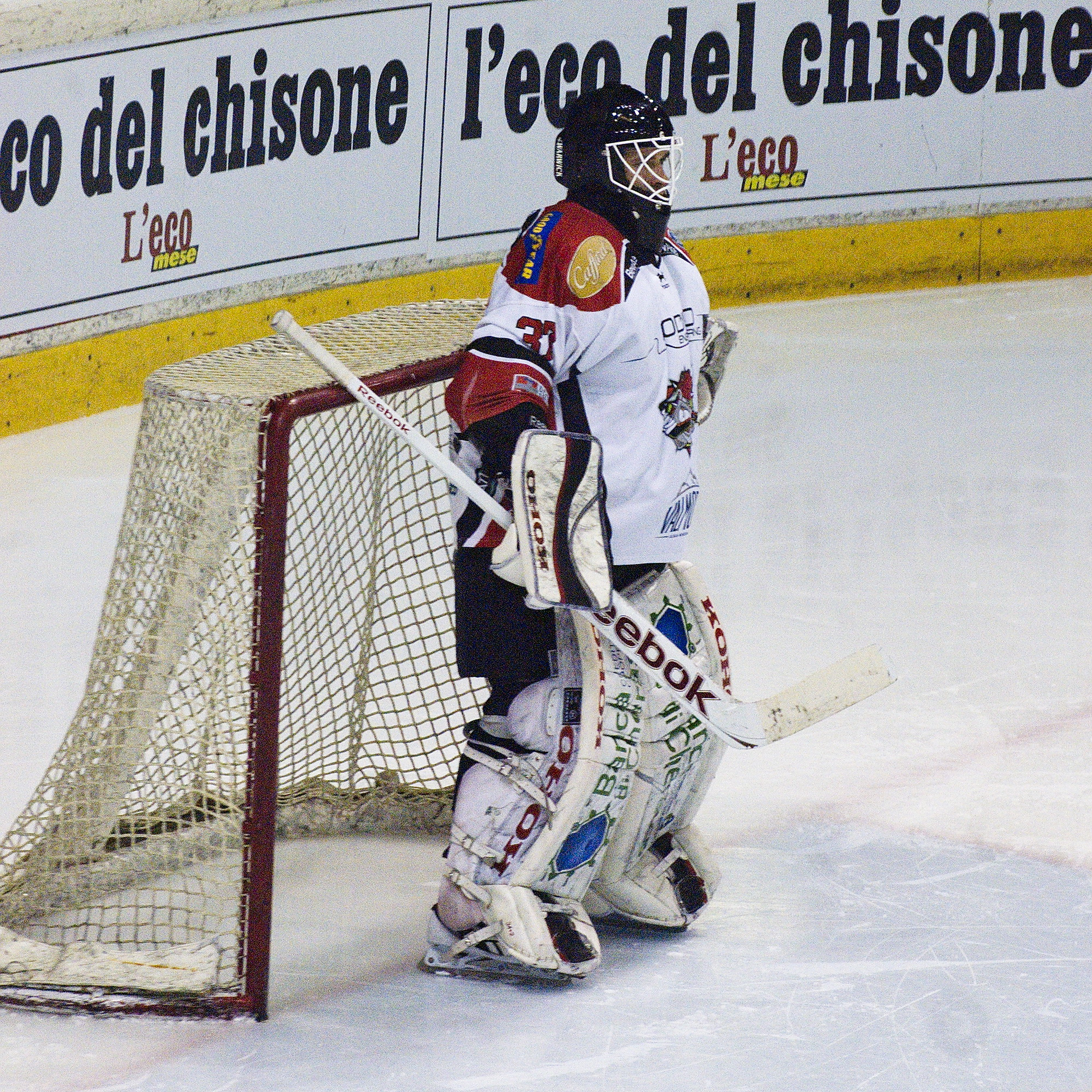
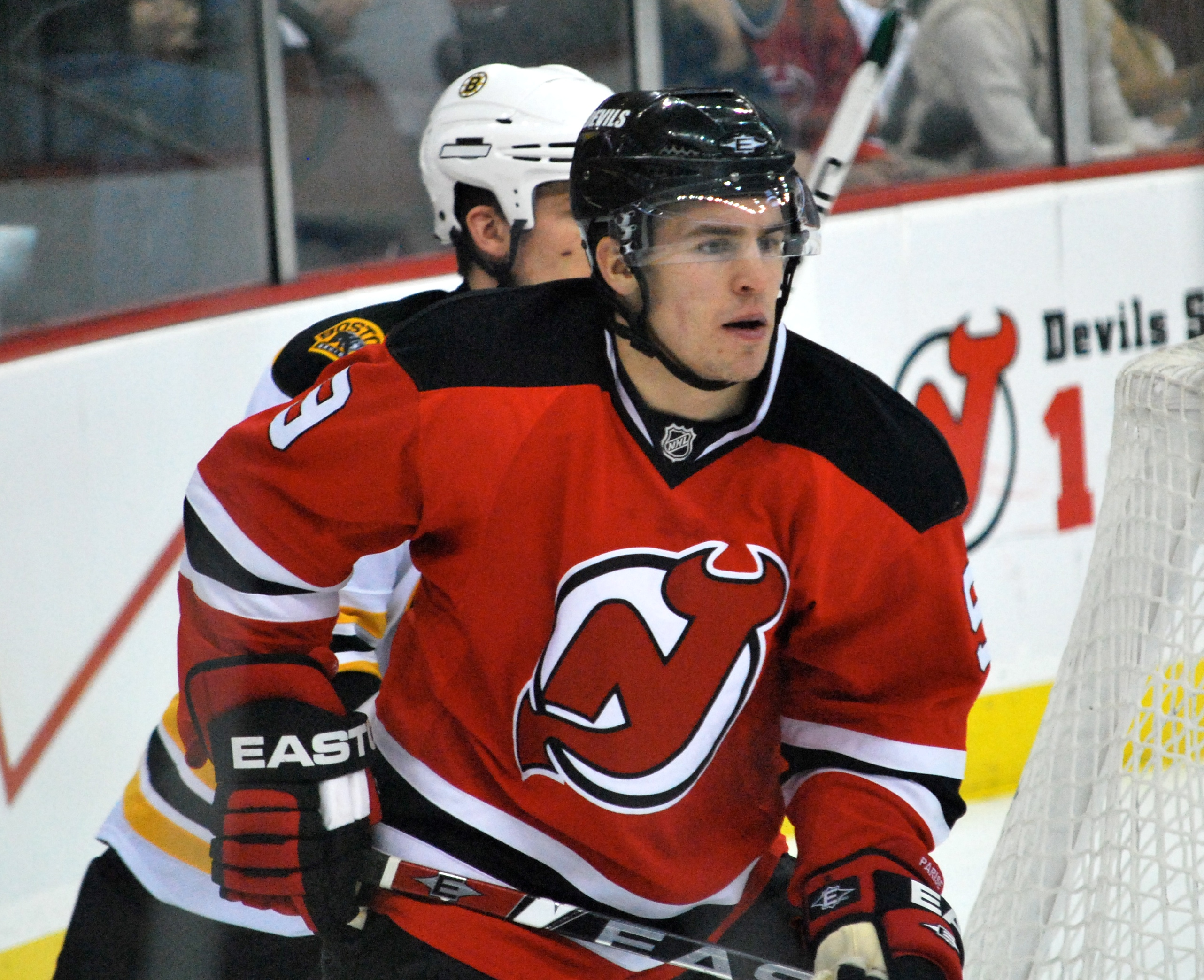
Parise's sons, Jordan (left, with HC Valpellice) and Zach (right, with the New Jersey Devils)

His youngest son Zach, played in the NHL as a forward for 19 years, finishing his career with the Colorado Avalanche. His eldest son, Jordan, was a goaltender who played in the United States Hockey League with the Chicago Steel and Waterloo Blackhawks, then played three seasons with the North Dakota Fighting Sioux hockey, leaving as the school's all-time leader in goals against average (2.14). Jordan signed a contract by the New Jersey Devils on July 14, 2006, and played with the Lowell Devils for two seasons. Jordan later played in Europe with EC Red Bull Salzburg, Klagenfurt AC, and HC Valpellice.

In addition to Zach and Jordan, Parisé had two children from his first marriage, Colette and Marc.

=== Death ===
It was reported in November 2014 that Parisé was in the advanced stages of lung cancer. Parisé died on January 7, 2015, of lung cancer, aged 73. He was survived by his wife of 42 years, Donna, and his four children.

== Achievements and facts ==
- Named to play in the NHL All-Star Game in 1970 and 1973.
- On April 11, 1975, Parisé scored a goal 11 seconds into overtime to give the Islanders a 4–3 win over the New York Rangers, clinching the best-of-3 playoff series for the Islanders. It was the fastest overtime goal in NHL history up to that time.
- At the time of his retirement, Parisé was the North Stars' all-time leader in assists, second in points, third in goals and fifth in games played.

== Career statistics ==
=== Regular season and playoffs ===
			Regular season					Playoffs
Season	Team	League	GP	G	A	Pts	PIM	GP	G	A	Pts	PIM
1961–62	Niagara Falls Flyers	OHA-Jr.	38	8	20	28	28	—	—	—	—	—
1961–62	Kingston Frontenacs	EPHL	1	0	0	0	0	—	—	—	—	—
1962–63	Kingston Frontenacs	EPHL	64	11	17	28	64	5	0	0	0	6
1963–64	Minneapolis Bruins	CPHL	72	27	36	63	77	5	1	2	3	10
1964–65	Minneapolis Bruins	CPHL	70	17	56	73	106	5	5	1	6	0
1965–66	Boston Bruins	NHL	3	0	0	0	0	—	—	—	—	—
1965–66	Oklahoma City Blazers	CPHL	69	19	30	49	137	7	6	3	9	2
1966–67	Boston Bruins	NHL	18	2	2	4	10	—	—	—	—	—
1966–67	Oklahoma City Blazers	CPHL	42	11	22	33	98	11	1	9	10	32
1967–68	Toronto Maple Leafs	NHL	1	0	1	1	0	—	—	—	—	—
1967–68	Rochester Americans	AHL	30	10	18	28	37	—	—	—	—	—
1967–68	Minnesota North Stars	NHL	43	11	16	27	27	14	2	5	7	10
1968–69	Minnesota North Stars	NHL	76	22	27	49	57	—	—	—	—	—
1969–70	Minnesota North Stars	NHL	74	24	48	72	72	6	3	2	5	2
1970–71	Minnesota North Stars	NHL	73	11	23	34	60	12	3	3	6	22
1971–72	Minnesota North Stars	NHL	71	19	18	37	70	7	3	3	6	6
1972–73	Minnesota North Stars	NHL	78	27	48	75	96	6	0	0	0	9
1973–74	Minnesota North Stars	NHL	78	18	37	55	42	—	—	—	—	—
1974–75	Minnesota North Stars	NHL	38	9	16	25	40	—	—	—	—	—
1974–75	New York Islanders	NHL	41	14	16	30	22	17	8	8	16	22
1975–76	New York Islanders	NHL	80	22	35	57	80	13	4	6	10	10
1976–77	New York Islanders	NHL	80	25	31	56	46	11	4	4	8	6
1977–78	New York Islanders	NHL	39	12	16	28	12	—	—	—	—	—
1977–78	Cleveland Barons	NHL	40	9	13	22	27	—	—	—	—	—
1978–79	Minnesota North Stars	NHL	57	13	9	22	45	—	—	—	—	—
NHL totals			890	238	356	594	706	86	27	31	58	87

=== International ===
Year	Team	Event	GP	G	A	Pts	PIM
1972	Canada	SS	6	2	2	4	28

Preceded by Nick Beverley	Minnesota North Stars captain 1978–79	Succeeded by Paul Shmyr
