= Billy Dea =

Canadian ice hockey player

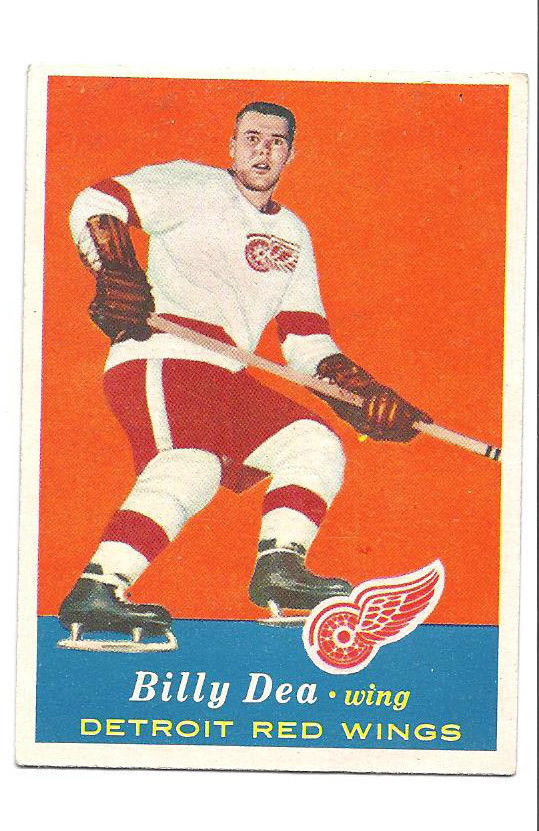
- Dea on a Topps hockey card from 1957
- Born: April 3, 1933 (age 93) Edmonton, Alberta, Canada
- Height: 5 ft 7 in (170 cm)
- Weight: 170 lb (77 kg; 12 st 2 lb)
- Position: Centre
- Shot: Left
- Played for: Pittsburgh Penguins; Chicago Black Hawks; Detroit Red Wings; New York Rangers
- Playing career: 1952–1972

William Fraser Dea (born April 3, 1933) is a Canadian former professional ice hockey centre and head coach in the National Hockey League (NHL). He played in the NHL from 1953 to 1971, and then served as a coach during the 1981–82 season.

== Playing career ==
A minor league standout, Dea began his NHL career with a brief fourteen-game assignment with the New York Rangers during the 1953–54 season. On August 18, 1955, the Rangers traded the NHL rights to Dea and Aggie Kukulowicz to the Detroit Red Wings in exchange for Bronco Horvath and Dave Creighton.

In 1957, he joined the Red Wings as a starting two-way forward. The next season, he was traded mid-season to the Chicago Black Hawks. For the next nine years, Dea would play exclusively in the American Hockey League, before expansion gave him another crack at the NHL. During the 1967–68 and 1968-69 campaigns, he was a regular on the Pittsburgh Penguins. He then returned to the Red Wings for an additional two years, ending his career with 67 goals and 54 assists in 397 games. In 1975, Dea became an assistant coach with the Red Wings.

== Post-playing career ==
In retirement, Dea joined the Detroit front office. During the 1981–82 NHL season, he became the head coach as a mid-season replacement for Wayne Maxner.

In 2017, he was inducted into the AHL Hall of Fame.

Dea earned the nickname "Hard Rock" for his punishing style of play. He is an uncle to former NHL defenceman James Wisniewski.

== Career statistics ==
=== Regular season and playoffs ===
			Regular season					Playoffs
Season	Team	League	GP	G	A	Pts	PIM	GP	G	A	Pts	PIM
1949–50	Lethbridge Native Sons	WCJHL	29	20	13	33	4	10	4	0	4	0
1950–51	Lethbridge Native Sons	WCJHL	38	25	22	47	6	—	—	—	—	—
1951–52	Lethbridge Native Sons	WCJHL	41	44	29	73	10	—	—	—	—	—
1952–53	Saskatoon Quakers	WHL	3	2	1	3	0	—	—	—	—	—
1952–53	Lethbridge Native Sons	WJHL	34	34	21	55	53	14	12	9	21	12
1952–53	Lethbridge Native Sons	M-Cup	—	—	—	—	—	11	11	4	15	6
1953–54	New York Rangers	NHL	14	1	1	2	2	—	—	—	—	—
1953–54	Vancouver Canucks	WHL	53	21	13	34	8	12	6	5	11	4
1954–55	Vancouver Canucks	WHL	59	18	13	31	13	4	0	1	1	0
1955–56	Edmonton Flyers	WHL	70	29	42	71	14	3	2	1	3	4
1956–57	Detroit Red Wings	NHL	69	15	15	30	14	5	2	0	2	2
1957–58	Detroit Red Wings	NHL	29	4	4	8	6	—	—	—	—	—
1957–58	Chicago Black Hawks	NHL	34	5	8	13	4	—	—	—	—	—
1958–59	Buffalo Bisons	AHL	70	25	45	70	19	11	5	4	9	4
1959–60	Buffalo Bisons	AHL	72	28	26	54	20	—	—	—	—	—
1960–61	Buffalo Bisons	AHL	72	35	39	74	10	4	1	2	3	0
1961–62	Buffalo Bisons	AHL	70	30	22	52	17	11	0	2	2	2
1962–63	Buffalo Bisons	AHL	72	20	12	32	25	13	2	8	10	0
1963–64	Buffalo Bisons	AHL	72	25	16	41	4	—	—	—	—	—
1964–65	Buffalo Bisons	AHL	72	21	19	40	15	9	3	0	3	0
1965–66	Buffalo Bisons	AHL	70	32	23	55	17	—	—	—	—	—
1966–67	Buffalo Bisons	AHL	71	25	39	64	5	—	—	—	—	—
1966–67	Chicago Black Hawks	NHL	—	—	—	—	—	2	0	0	0	2
1967–68	Pittsburgh Penguins	NHL	73	16	12	28	6	—	—	—	—	—
1968–69	Pittsburgh Penguins	NHL	66	10	8	18	4	—	—	—	—	—
1969–70	Baltimore Clippers	AHL	7	0	1	1	2	—	—	—	—	—
1969–70	Detroit Red Wings	NHL	70	10	3	13	6	4	0	1	1	2
1970–71	Detroit Red Wings	NHL	42	6	3	9	2	—	—	—	—	—
1970–71	Fort Worth Wings	CHL	26	8	15	23	10	4	0	4	4	0
1971–72	Tidewater Wings	AHL	72	7	7	14	8	—	—	—	—	—
AHL totals			720	248	249	497	182	48	11	16	27	6
NHL totals			397	67	54	121	44	11	2	1	3	6

== NHL coaching record ==
Team	Year	Regular season						Postseason
Team	Year	G	W	L	T	Pts	Finish	Result
Detroit Red Wings	1981-82	11	3	8	0	6	6th in Norris	Missed playoffs

Preceded by Wayne Maxner	Head coach of the Detroit Red Wings; 1982	Succeeded by Nick Polano
