= Bob Blackburn (ice hockey) =

Canadian ice hockey player

- Born: February 1, 1938 Rouyn, Quebec, Canada
- Died: October 24, 2016 (aged 78) Sudbury, Ontario, Canada
- Height: 5 ft 11 in (180 cm)
- Weight: 180 lb (82 kg; 12 st 12 lb)
- Position: Defence
- Shot: Left
- Played for: New York Rangers; Pittsburgh Penguins
- Playing career: 1958–1972

Robert John Blackburn (February 1, 1938 – October 24, 2016) was a Canadian professional ice hockey player. He played 135 games in the National Hockey League for the New York Rangers and Pittsburgh Penguins between 1969 and 1971. The rest of his career, which lasted from 1958 to 1972, was spent in the minor leagues.

== Career statistics ==
=== Regular season and playoffs ===
| | | | Regular season | | | | | Playoffs |
| Season | Team | League | GP | G | A | Pts | PIM | GP | G | A | Pts | PIM |
|---|---|---|---|---|---|---|---|---|---|---|---|---|
| 1955–56 | New Liskeard Cubs U18 | U18 AAA | — | — | — | — | — | — | — | — | — | — |
| 1956–57 | Barrie Flyers | OHA | 21 | 0 | 0 | 0 | 7 | 1 | 0 | 0 | 0 | 0 |
| 1957–58 | Barrie Flyers | OHA | 51 | 13 | 26 | 39 | 171 | 4 | 3 | 0 | 3 | 23 |
| 1958–59 | Quebec Aces | QSHL | 29 | 1 | 1 | 2 | 36 | — | — | — | — | — |
| 1958–59 | Washington Presidents | EHL | 21 | 1 | 10 | 11 | 44 | — | — | — | — | — |
| 1959–60 | Kingston Frontenacs | EPHL | 27 | 0 | 7 | 7 | 41 | — | — | — | — | — |
| 1959–60 | Providence Reds | AHL | 37 | 0 | 2 | 2 | 8 | — | — | — | — | — |
| 1960–61 | Providence Reds | AHL | 50 | 1 | 5 | 6 | 53 | — | — | — | — | — |
| 1961–62 | Providence Reds | AHL | 64 | 1 | 11 | 12 | 157 | 3 | 0 | 1 | 1 | 2 |
| 1962–63 | Providence Reds | AHL | 47 | 2 | 7 | 9 | 56 | 6 | 0 | 0 | 0 | 4 |
| 1963–64 | Providence Reds | AHL | 70 | 2 | 20 | 22 | 175 | 3 | 0 | 2 | 2 | 4 |
| 1964–65 | Providence Reds | AHL | 67 | 1 | 17 | 18 | 162 | — | — | — | — | — |
| 1965–66 | Providence Reds | AHL | 27 | 0 | 4 | 4 | 52 | — | — | — | — | — |
| 1965–66 | Vancouver Canucks | WHL | 28 | 1 | 5 | 6 | 44 | 7 | 0 | 0 | 0 | 12 |
| 1966–67 | Vancouver Canucks | WHL | 69 | 2 | 11 | 13 | 120 | 8 | 0 | 4 | 4 | 16 |
| 1967–68 | Buffalo Bisons | AHL | 69 | 2 | 15 | 17 | 116 | 5 | 1 | 1 | 2 | 14 |
| 1968–69 | New York Rangers | NHL | 11 | 0 | 0 | 0 | 0 | — | — | — | — | — |
| 1968–69 | Buffalo Bisons | AHL | 58 | 3 | 15 | 18 | 73 | 6 | 0 | 1 | 1 | 14 |
| 1969–70 | Pittsburgh Penguins | NHL | 60 | 4 | 7 | 11 | 51 | 6 | 0 | 0 | 0 | 4 |
| 1969–70 | Baltimore Clippers | AHL | 6 | 0 | 0 | 0 | 4 | — | — | — | — | — |
| 1970–71 | Pittsburgh Penguins | NHL | 64 | 4 | 5 | 9 | 54 | — | — | — | — | — |
| 1971–72 | Rochester Americans | AHL | 64 | 7 | 11 | 18 | 72 | — | — | — | — | — |
| AHL totals | | | 559 | 19 | 107 | 126 | 924 | 23 | 1 | 5 | 6 | 38 |
| NHL totals | | | 135 | 8 | 12 | 20 | 105 | 6 | 0 | 0 | 0 | 4 |
