= List of Nashville Predators broadcasters =

The Nashville Predators are a professional ice hockey team based in Nashville, Tennessee. Beginning in the 2026-27 season, local television rights of Predators games are held by Scripps Sports, who will primarily air games on forthcoming independent station WNPX-TV within the Nashville market with secondary coverage on CBS affiliate WTVF. Prior to 2026, Predators games aired on FanDuel Sports Network South (Formerly Bally Sports South), with its territory covering Tennessee, Georgia, most of Kentucky, northern Mississippi and northern Alabama. Radio coverage is carried by the Nashville Predators Radio Network, whose flagship station is WPRT-FM.

== Radio ==
On August 15, 2011, it was confirmed that WPRT would switch to a sports format. Adopting the new moniker "102.5 The Game", the format change took effect on Monday, August 29, 2011, at 6 AM, following a weekend of stunting of construction sounds, Nashville Predators highlights, and a loop for several hours of the closing chorus of "The Party's Over" by Journey. The station took over flagship status for the Predators after a one-year stint on sister-station 102.9 The Buzz. Upon its format change, the station announced it would become a primary affiliate of ESPN Radio in six weeks after launch. This delay was due to ESPN Radio exercising an eight-week exit clause (executed two weeks prior to launch) in the contract with secondary affiliate WGFX-FM. Upon assumption of the affiliation, WPRT-FM began to carry various ESPN Radio programming. Over time, the station has added more local programming, including multiple specialty hockey shows.

At the start of the 2024-25 season, Pete Weber reduced his schedule to only home games, with the exception of playoff games and specialty games, such as 2025 games in Sweeden. Max Herz was named play-by-play broadcaster for road games.

| Years | Play-by-play | Color commentators |
|---|---|---|
| 1998–2006 | Pete Weber | Terry Crisp |
| 2006–07 | Eli Gold | Jim McKenzie |
| 2007–08 | Pete Weber | Terry Crisp |
| 2008–10 | Pete Weber | Terry Crisp and Tom Callahan |
| 2010–11 | Tom Callahan | Wade Belak |
| 2011–14 | Tom Callahan | Stu Grimson |
| 2014–15 | Willy Daunic | Brent Peterson |
| 2015–24 | Pete Weber | Hal Gill; Brent Peterson |
| 2024-present | Pete Weber (home & playoff games); Max Herz (road games) | Hal Gill; Brent Peterson |

=== Spanish Broadcasts ===
Beginning in 2022, the Predators broadcast games in Spanish on WMGC (AM). Alex Martinez and Nayele Alamilla handle play-by-play, while Jordi Sanchez does color commentary.

== Television ==
| Years | Play-by-play | Color commentators |
|---|---|---|
| 1998–14 | Pete Weber | Terry Crisp |
| 2014–15 | Pete Weber | Stu Grimson |
| 2015–17 | Willy Daunic | Stu Grimson |
| 2017–present | Willy Daunic | Chris Mason; Hal Gill (select games) |

=== Current on-air staff ===
- Willy Daunic – play-by-play
- Chris Mason – color commentator
- Lyndsay Rowley – Preds Live anchor, away game bench reporter
- Kara Hammer – home game bench reporter
- Hal Gill – intermission commentator
- Kelsey Wingert – Preds Studio Update Host

=== Current stations ===
- WNPX-TV / Nashville (flagship)
- WMC-TV 5.3 / Memphis
- WVLT-TV 8.2 / Knoxville
- WTVL-CD 49.2 / Chattanooga
- WBBJ-TV 7.5 / Jackson
- WDRB 41.2 / Louisville, Kentucky
- WTVQ-DT 36.2 / Lexington, Kentucky
- WAFF 48.3 / Huntsville, Alabama
- WAGA-TV 5.3 / Atlanta
