= Terry Crisp =

Canadian ice hockey player and coach

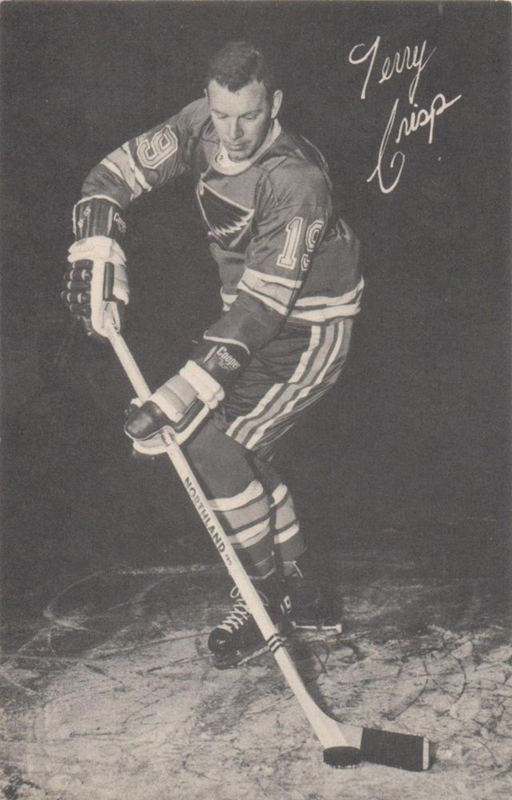
- Born: May 28, 1943 (age 83) Parry Sound, Ontario, Canada
- Height: 5 ft 10 in (178 cm)
- Weight: 170 lb (77 kg; 12 st 2 lb)
- Position: Centre
- Shot: Left
- Played for: Boston Bruins; St. Louis Blues; New York Islanders; Philadelphia Flyers
- Coached for: Calgary Flames; Tampa Bay Lightning
- Playing career: 1963–1977
- Coaching career: 1977–1997

Terrance Arthur Crisp (born May 28, 1943) is a Canadian former professional ice hockey coach and player. Crisp played ten seasons in the National Hockey League (NHL) for the Boston Bruins, St. Louis Blues, New York Islanders and Philadelphia Flyers between 1965 and 1977. Crisp coached for 11 seasons in the NHL for the Philadelphia Flyers, Calgary Flames and Tampa Bay Lightning. Crisp also worked as a radio and TV broadcaster for the Nashville Predators. Crisp retired from his broadcast duties at the end of the 2021–22 season.

Crisp was a member of two of the Stanley Cup championship teams with the Philadelphia Flyers in the 1970s, and later coached the Calgary Flames to the title in 1989.

== Playing career ==
Crisp got his start playing Jr. 'B' hockey with the St. Marys Lincolns of the Western Jr. 'B' Hockey League. In 1961 he edged out Phil Esposito of the Sarnia Legionnaires for the league scoring title. At 17, he had pondered quitting hockey due to homesickness and become a school teacher. However, Stan Moore, who coached the B team, followed him when Crisp travelled four hours to his home at Parry Sound. He convinced him to pack his suitcase and come back down to play.

Crisp began his pro career in the Boston Bruins organization, playing one season for them before being chosen by the St. Louis Blues in the 1967 NHL expansion draft. With the Blues, he went to the finals three straight seasons. In 1972, he was again chosen in the expansion draft, this time by the New York Islanders. Late in the 1972–73 season, he was traded to the Philadelphia Flyers for Jean Potvin. It is believed the trade was made because the Islanders, who would have the first overall pick in the upcoming draft, intended to draft Denis Potvin, and believed having his older brother on the team would entice him to sign with the Isles instead of going to the rival World Hockey Association.

Crisp played on the notorious Philadelphia Flyers teams of the 1970s when they were also known as the Broad Street Bullies. He won two Stanley Cups as a member of the Flyers in 1973-74 and 1974–75.

== Coaching career ==
Crisp retired following the 1976–77 season at the age of 34 to become the Flyers assistant coach under Fred Shero. In the 1980s, he coached in the junior ranks and led the 1985 Sault Ste Marie Greyhounds to an undefeated season at home, going 33–0. The club finished first in the Ontario Hockey League with 54 wins, eleven losses, and one tie. The club set a Canadian junior record by winning 33 games in a row at home. The Sault also took the OHL playoff championship, losing just two games, both at home. The Greyhounds represented the OHL at the Memorial Cup, where they came up short, losing to eventual champion Prince Albert of the WHL.

Thanks to his tremendous coaching success in junior, Crisp was named head coach of the Calgary Flames in 1987–88, following two years as the head coach of the team's AHL affiliate in Moncton. The 1987–88 Calgary Flames season saw them go 48–23–9 and win their first division title in team history, which saw Crisp allow his players to decide who would play and who would not among a cadre of talent that included Al MacInnis, Theo Fleury, Joe Nieuwendyk, and Lanny McDonald. They were awarded the Presidents' Trophy due to having the most points among all NHL teams. However, the Flames lost in the second round to their rival in the Edmonton Oilers, who beat them in a sweep in an eventual Stanley Cup championship (their fourth in five years). The 397 goals scored in the season is a franchise record.

The 1988–89 Calgary Flames season was even better. They went 54–17–9 (becoming the fifth team to win 50 games in league history) and lost only four times at home in the regular season while winning the Presidents' Trophy again. In the playoffs, the only challenge proved to be in the first round against the Vancouver Canucks, who took them to Game 7 that saw Calgary win in overtime. They won the next two rounds while only losing once combined to reach the 1989 Stanley Cup Final. Facing the Montreal Canadiens, they won Game 1 before Montreal took the next two games. However, Crisp and the Flames rebounded with three straight wins, which included a Game 6 win at the Montreal Forum, becoming the second, only visiting team, and last team to clinch a Stanley Cup at the historic venue. The 1989–90 Calgary Flames season saw them go 42–23–15 and win another division title with the best record in their conference. They faced the Los Angeles Kings, who had finished 24 points behind them. Calgary was stunned in six games by the Kings, who split the first two games in Calgary before winning the next two (with a 12–4 loss being one of them). Only a Game 5 win delayed their demise in a Game 6 that saw them lose in double overtime.

On May 7, 1990, three weeks after the defeat, Crisp was fired. He had received attention in the city due to criticizing his players in public, and he was told to tone down his fiery temper behind the bench due to the complaints from fans of his foul language. He went 144–63–33 in three seasons. The Flames did not have an immediate successor for Crisp until they hired Doug Risebrough, and they did not win a postseason series until 2004.

Crisp was hired as the inaugural coach of the expansion team Tampa Bay Lightning on April 23, 1992. He was hired due to his "pizzazz, some jump, some color" by general manager Phil Esposito in order to help sell tickets along with coach. They lost plenty of games in the first few years (125 in the first three seasons) before the 1995–96 Tampa Bay Lightning season saw them make the postseason on the final day of the season. They had a record of 38–32–12 and made it as the 8th seed by two points. In the playoffs, they faced the Philadelphia Flyers. The Lightning won Game 2 in overtime before returning to Tampa to host their first ever playoff games. They won Game 3 in overtime, but the Flyers won the next three games to win the series. They finished 32–40–10 the following year, finishing three points out of a playoff spot. The bottom fell out the next year. They were 2–6–2 going into a matchup against the New York Rangers. They led 3–1 in the third period before the Rangers scored three straight goals to win 4–3. Subsequently, he was fired two days after the game on October 26, and he was replaced by Rick Paterson on an interim basis for six games before Jacques Demers was brought in to coach the rest of the season, which saw them win 17 games for the second time in four seasons. He went 142–204–45 with Tampa.

== Broadcasting career ==
For a time, Crisp served as a studio analyst/color commentator for NHL on Fox. In 1997, Crisp was hired to serve as the color commentator for the Nashville Predators, working for Fox Sports Tennessee and its successor Bally Sports South alongside play-by-play man Pete Weber. He moved from the broadcasting booth to analyst after the 2013–2014 season. His contribution in hockey insight earned him induction into the Tennessee Sports Hall of Fame in 2020. He announced his retirement from broadcasting in October 2021, effective at the end of the 2021–22 season.

== Awards ==
- 1973–74 - Stanley Cup Champion (Philadelphia Flyers)
- 1974–75 - Stanley Cup Champion (Philadelphia Flyers)
- 1988–89 - Stanley Cup Champion (Calgary Flames - Head Coach)

== Career statistics ==
			Regular season					Playoffs
Season	Team	League	GP	G	A	Pts	PIM	GP	G	A	Pts	PIM
1960–61	St. Mary's Lincolns	WOJHL	32	49	71	120	—	—	—	—	—	—
1961–62	Niagara Falls Flyers	OHA	50	16	22	38	57	10	1	6	7	6
1962–63	Niagara Falls Flyers	OHA	50	39	35	74	68	9	5	12	17	10
1962–63	Niagara Falls Flyers	MC	—	—	—	—	—	16	11	12	23	22
1963–64	Minneapolis Bruins	CPHL	42	15	20	35	22	—	—	—	—	—
1964–65	Minneapolis Bruins	CPHL	70	28	34	62	22	5	0	2	2	0
1965–66	Boston Bruins	NHL	3	0	0	0	0	—	—	—	—	—
1965–66	Oklahoma City Blazers	CPHL	61	11	22	33	35	9	1	5	6	0
1966–67	Oklahoma City Blazers	CPHL	69	31	42	73	37	11	3	7	10	0
1967–68	St. Louis Blues	NHL	73	9	20	29	10	18	1	5	6	6
1968–69	St. Louis Blues	NHL	57	6	9	15	14	12	3	4	7	20
1968–69	Kansas City Blues	CHL	4	1	1	2	4	—	—	—	—	—
1969–70	St. Louis Blues	NHL	26	5	6	11	2	16	2	3	5	2
1969–70	Buffalo Bisons	AHL	51	15	34	49	14	—	—	—	—	—
1970–71	St. Louis Blues	NHL	54	5	11	16	13	6	1	0	1	2
1971–72	St. Louis Blues	NHL	75	13	18	31	12	11	1	3	4	2
1972–73	New York Islanders	NHL	54	4	16	20	6	—	—	—	—	—
1972–73	Philadelphia Flyers	NHL	12	1	5	6	2	11	3	2	5	2
1973–74	Philadelphia Flyers	NHL	71	10	21	31	28	17	2	2	4	4
1974–75	Philadelphia Flyers	NHL	71	8	19	27	20	9	2	4	6	0
1975–76	Philadelphia Flyers	NHL	38	6	9	15	28	10	0	5	5	2
1976–77	Philadelphia Flyers	NHL	2	0	0	0	0	—	—	—	—	—
NHL totals			536	67	134	201	135	110	15	28	43	40

== Coaching record ==
=== NHL head coaching ===
Team	Year	Regular season						Postseason			
Team	Year	G	W	L	T	Pts	Finish	W	L	Win %	Result
1987–88	CGY	80	48	23	9	105	1st in Smythe	4	5	.444	Lost in Second Round (EDM)
1988–89	CGY	80	54	17	9	117	1st in Smythe	16	6	.727	Won Stanley Cup (MTL)
1989–90	CGY	80	42	23	15	99	1st in Smythe	2	4	.333	Lost in First Round (LAK)
CGY Total		240	144	63	33			22	15	.595	3 playoff appearances
1992–93	TBL	84	23	54	7	53	6th in Atlantic	—	—	—	Missed playoffs
1993–94	TBL	84	30	43	11	71	7th in Atlantic	—	—	—	Missed playoffs
1994–95	TBL	48	17	28	3	37	6th in Atlantic	—	—	—	Missed playoffs
1995–96	TBL	82	38	32	12	88	5th in Atlantic	2	4	.333	Lost in First Round (PHI)
1996–97	TBL	82	32	40	10	74	6th in Atlantic	—	—	—	Missed playoffs
1997–98	TBL	11	2	7	2	(6)	(fired)	—	—	—	—
TBL Total		391	142	204	45			2	4	.333	1 playoff appearance
Total		631	286	267	78			24	19	.558	4 playoff appearances 1 Stanley Cup title

=== Minor leagues & assistant coach positions ===
Season	Team	League	Type	G	W	L	T	OTL	Pct
1977–78	Philadelphia Flyers	NHL	Assistant coach
1978–79	Philadelphia Flyers	NHL	Assistant coach
1979–80	Sault Ste. Marie Greyhounds	OMJHL	Head coach	68	22	45	1	0	.331
1980–81	Sault Ste. Marie Greyhounds	OHL	Head coach	68	47	19	2	0	.706
1981–82	Sault Ste. Marie Greyhounds	OHL	Head coach	68	40	25	3	0	.610
1982–83	Sault Ste. Marie Greyhounds	OHL	Head coach	70	48	21	1	0	.693
1983–84	Sault Ste. Marie Greyhounds	OHL	Head coach	70	38	28	4	0	.571
1984–85	Sault Ste. Marie Greyhounds	OHL	Head coach	66	54	11	1	0	.826
1985–86	Moncton Golden Flames	AHL	Head coach	80	34	34	12	0	.500
1986–87	Moncton Golden Flames	AHL	Head coach	80	43	31	0	6	.575

^{1} Midseason replacement

Preceded by Bob Johnson	Head coach of the Calgary Flames; 1987–90	Succeeded by Doug Risebrough
Preceded by Position created	Head coach of the Tampa Bay Lightning; 1992–97	Succeeded by Rick Paterson
