= Niagara Falls Flyers =

Canadian junior ice hockey team (1960–1982)

- City: Niagara Falls, Ontario
- League: Ontario Hockey Association (1960–1972); Ontario Hockey League (1976–1982)
- Operated: 1960–1972, 1976–1982
- Home arena: Niagara Falls Memorial Arena
- Colours: Gold, white and black
- Parent club: Boston Bruins (1960–1967)

Franchise history
- 1943–1947: St. Catharines Falcons
- 1947–1962: St. Catharines Teepees
- 1962–1976: St. Catharines Black Hawks
- 1976–1982: Niagara Falls Flyers
- 1982–2002: North Bay Centennials
- 2002–present: Saginaw Spirit

Previous franchise history
- 1945–1960: Barrie Flyers
- 1960–1972: Niagara Falls Flyers
- 1972–present: Sudbury Wolves

Championships
- Playoff championships: 1965 Memorial Cup; 1968 Memorial Cup

The Niagara Falls Flyers were two junior ice hockey franchises that played in the top tier in the Ontario Hockey Association. The first, a Junior "A" team existed from 1960 until 1972, and the second in Tier I Junior "A" from 1976 until 1982.

Both teams were owned by the Emms Family, and were relocated to Niagara Falls from another city. The Niagara Falls Memorial Arena was home ice to both teams.

== History ==
Flyers logo from 1960 to 1972.

The first Flyers team relocated to Niagara Falls from Barrie in 1960. The team was affiliated with the Boston Bruins of the National Hockey League (NHL). The Flyers appeared in three Memorial Cups in the 1960s, winning in 1965 and 1968. Both versions of the Flyers played home games at Niagara Falls Memorial Arena from 1960 to 1972, and again from 1976 to 1982. The arena hosted Memorial Cup games in 1968.

=== 1963 Memorial Cup ===
Niagara Falls won the right to play for the Cup by defeating the Toronto Neil McNeil Maroons for the OHA championship, and the Espanola Eagles to win the George Richardson Memorial Trophy as eastern Canadian representatives.

The Flyers were runners up to the Memorial Cup in 1963 played at Edmonton's Arena Gardens. They lost in six games to the Edmonton Oil Kings in a best-of-seven series. Flyers players Dornhoefer and Harmer both suffered broken legs while on the ice.

=== 1965 Memorial Cup ===
Niagara Falls won the right to play for the Cup by defeating the defending champions Toronto Marlboros for the OHA championship. The Memorial Cup in 1965 was again played at Edmonton's Arena Gardens. They defeated the Oil Kings 4 games to 1 in a best-of-seven rematch series from two years previous. The series was filled with brawls and suspensions, as well as a heavy police presence throughout.

=== 1968 Memorial Cup ===
Niagara Falls won the right to play for the Cup by defeating the Kitchener Rangers for the OHA championship, and the Verdun Maple Leafs for the eastern championship.

The 1968 Memorial Cup featured two Boston Bruins farm teams playing one another. The Flyers would play the Estevan Bruins on home ice, except for game two at the Montreal Forum. Game 4 was the longest in Memorial Cup history, lasting into five periods. Niagara Falls defeated Estevan in a best-of-seven series in five games.

=== Second Flyers ===
Team uniforms from 1980 to 1982

The Emms Family sold the Flyers in 1972 after it played for 12 seasons. The new owners then relocated the team to Sudbury to become the Sudbury Wolves.

Later the same year, after selling the Flyers, the Emms family bought the St. Catharines Black Hawks team who were the OHA champions the previous year. Four years after buying the Black Hawks, the Emms family relocated them to Niagara Falls in 1976, taking the same name as the previous team. The Emms family later sold this version of the Flyers in 1978.

The second Flyers team played for 4 seasons in the Ontario Hockey Association from 1976 to 1980, and 2 years in the Ontario Hockey League from 1980 to 1982. The Flyers appeared in the OHA finals in 1979, losing to Peterborough. Niagara Falls lost its Flyers team a second time in 1982 when they moved to North Bay to become the Centennials, who have subsequently moved to Saginaw in 2002 to become the Saginaw Spirit.

== Championships ==
The Niagara Falls Flyers are one of a few clubs to win multiple Memorial Cup championships. Also of note, the franchise were repeat champions in different home cities, of Barrie and Niagara Falls. In total, the Flyers won the Memorial Cup twice in Niagara Falls, and twice in Barrie. and the J. Ross Robertson Cup 3 times each in Barrie and Niagara Falls. The Flyers finished first overall in 1963 & 1965 during the regular season to win the Hamilton Spectator Trophy. The second Niagara Falls Flyers team won the western conference Emms Trophy in the 1978–79 playoffs.

Memorial Cup

- 1963 Lost to Edmonton Oil Kings
- 1965 Champions vs. Edmonton Oil Kings
- 1968 Champions vs. Estevan Bruins

George Richardson Memorial Trophy

- 1963 Champions vs. Espanola Eagles
- 1965 Champions vs. Lachine Maroons
- 1968 Champions vs. Verdun Maple Leafs

J. Ross Robertson Cup

- 1963 Champions vs. Neil McNeil Maroons
- 1965 Champions vs. Toronto Marlboros
- 1968 Champions vs. Kitchener Rangers
- 1979 Lost to Peterborough Petes

Hamilton Spectator Trophy

- 1962–63 (69pts) and 1964–65 (81pts)

Emms Trophy

- 1978–79 (Western Conference)

== Coaches ==
The Flyers from 1960 to 1972 were coached by Hap Emms, Bill Long and Paul Emms. The Flyers coaches from 1976 to 1982 are listed below.

- 1976–78: Paul Emms (2)
- 1978–79: Bert Templeton (2)
- 1979–80: Barry Boughner, F.Stanfield
- 1980–81: Paul Gauthier
- 1981–82: Bert Templeton (2)

== Players ==
=== Award winners ===
Season	Player	Award	Recognition	Source
1962–63	Wayne Maxner	Red Tilson Trophy	Most outstanding player	
1962–63	Wayne Maxner	Eddie Powers Memorial Trophy	OHA scoring champion	
1963–64	Bernie Parent	Dave Pinkney Trophy	Lowest team GAA	
1964–65	Bernie Parent	Dave Pinkney Trophy	Lowest team GAA	
1966–67	Derek Sanderson	Eddie Powers Memorial Trophy	OHA scoring champion	
1967–68	Tom Webster	Eddie Powers Memorial Trophy	OHA scoring champion	
1967–68	Tom Webster	William Hanley Trophy	Most sportsmanlike player	
1976–77	Mike Gartner	Emms Family Award	OHA rookie of the year	
1978–79	Nick Ricci	F. W. "Dinty" Moore Trophy	Lowest rookie GAA	
1981–82	Ron Meighan	Max Kaminsky Trophy	Most outstanding defenceman	

=== NHL alumni ===
Ninety-one players from the Flyers played in the National Hockey League (NHL) or World Hockey Association. (Note: 60 players from the Niagara Falls Flyers [1960–1972], and 31 players from the Niagara Falls Flyers [1976–1982].) Two Hockey Hall of Fame inductees are Flyers alumni: Bernie Parent (1963–1965) and Mike Gartner (1976–1979).

1960 to 1972

- Mike Amodeo
- John Arbour
- Steve Atkinson
- Don Awrey
- Jacques Blain
- Bob Boyd
- Brian Bradley
- Doug Brindley
- Tom Colley
- Terry Crisp
- Jim Dorey
- Gary Dornhoefer
- Tommy Earl
- Doug Favell
- George Gardner
- Jeannot Gilbert
- Bill Goldsworthy
- Larry Gould
- Gary Holt
- Randy Holt
- Mike Keeler
- Wayne King
- Bill Knibbs
- Don Lever
- Rick Ley
- Jim Lorentz
- Don Marcotte
- Gilles Marotte
- Wayne Maxner
- Don McCulloch
- Don McLean
- Brent Meeke
- Phil Myre
- Rosaire Paiement
- Wilf Paiement
- Bernie Parent
- J. P. Parisé
- Jean Pronovost
- Bob Ring
- Phil Roberto
- Wayne Rutledge
- Larry Sacharuk
- Derek Sanderson
- Ron Schock
- Jim Schoenfeld
- Brad Selwood
- Ted Snell
- Steve Stone
- Garry Swain
- Don Tannahill
- Dave Tataryn
- Morris Titanic
- Eric Vail
- Dave Walter
- Rob Walton
- Tom Webster
- Ed Westfall
- Barry Wilkins
- Butch Williams
- Dunc Wilson

1976 to 1982

- Mark Botell
- Marty Dallman
- Mike Dwyer
- Jeff Eatough
- Daryl Evans
- Lou Franceschetti
- Ron Friest
- Bob Froese
- Mike Gartner
- John Gibson
- Paul Gillis
- Pat Graham
- Jim Jackson
- Bob LaForest
- Mark LaForest
- Steve Larmer
- Steve Ludzik
- Andrew McBain
- Kevin McClelland
- Scott McLellan
- Ron Meighan
- Mark Osborne
- Steve Peters
- Mark Renaud
- Nick Ricci
- Gerry Rioux
- Bill Root
- Andy Schliebener
- Howard Scruton
- Bill Stewart
- Tom Thornbury

== Season-by-season results ==
=== 1960–1972 ===
Regular season and playoffs results:

Legend: GP = Games played, W = Wins, L = Losses, T = Ties, Pts = Points, GF = Goals for, GA = Goals against

Memorial Cup champions	League champions	League finalists

Season	Regular season									Playoffs
Season	GP	W	L	T	Pts	Pct	GF	GA	Finish	Playoffs
1960–61	48	22	21	5	49	0.510	165	166	4th OHA	Lost quarterfinal (Guelph Royals) 10–4
1961–62	50	16	23	11	43	0.430	193	193	4th OHA	Won semifinal (Montreal Junior Canadiens) 4–2; Lost OHA final (Hamilton Red Wings) 8–0
1962–63	50	31	12	7	69	0.690	212	146	1st OHA	Won semifinal (Hamilton Red Wings) 8–2; Won OHA final (Montreal Junior Canadiens) 8–0; Won Ontario Junior A final (Toronto Neil McNeil Maroons) 4–2; Won Eastern Canada playoffs (Espanola Eagles) 4–0; Lost 1963 Memorial Cup (Edmonton Oil Kings) 4–2
1963–64	56	26	22	8	60	0.536	207	178	4th OHA	Lost quarterfinal (Toronto Marlboros) 8–0
1964–65	56	36	11	9	81	0.723	236	168	1st OHA	Won quarterfinal (Oshawa Generals) 8–4; Bye through semifinal Won OHA final Toronto Marlboros 8–2; Won Eastern Canada playoffs (Lachine Maroons) 3–1; Won 1965 Memorial Cup (Edmonton Oil Kings) 4–1
1965–66	48	23	15	10	56	0.583	210	162	3rd OHA	Lost quarterfinal (Kitchener Rangers) 8–4
1966–67	48	23	15	10	56	0.583	238	195	2nd OHA	Won quarterfinal (London Nationals) 8–4; Lost semifinal (Hamilton Red Wings) 8–6
1967–68	54	32	15	7	71	0.657	255	169	4th OHA	Won quarterfinal (Peterborough Petes) 8–2; Won semifinal Montreal Junior Canadiens 8–4; Won OHA final Kitchener Rangers 9–7; Won Eastern Canada playoffs (Verdun Maple Leafs) 3–2; Won 1968 Memorial Cup (Estevan Bruins) 4–1
1968–69	54	28	24	2	58	0.537	223	229	4th OHA	Won quarterfinal (Ottawa 67's) 9–5; Lost semifinal (St. Catharines Black Hawks) 8–6
1969–70	54	10	41	3	23	0.213	151	313	10th OHA	Did not qualify
1970–71	62	11	44	7	29	0.234	193	350	10th OHA	Did not qualify
1971–72	63	27	27	9	63	0.500	280	293	6th OHA	Lost quarterfinal (Oshawa Generals) 8–4

=== 1976–1982 ===
Regular season and playoffs results:

Legend: GP = Games played, W = Wins, L = Losses, T = Ties, Pts = Points, GF = Goals for, GA = Goals against

Memorial Cup champions	League champions	League finalists

Season	Regular season									Playoffs
Season	GP	W	L	T	Pts	Pct	GF	GA	Finish	Playoffs
1976–77	66	15	45	6	36	0.273	254	370	6th Emms	Did not qualify
1977–78	68	17	41	10	44	0.324	261	340	6th Emms	Did not qualify
1978–79	68	43	21	4	90	0.662	361	243	1st Emms	Won quarterfinals (Kitchener Rangers) 8–6; Won semifinal round-robin (Windsor Spitfires and London Knights) (Note: The quarterfinals series between the Windsor Spitfires and London Knights was protested by the Knights, resulting in the both teams advancing into a round-robin series versus the Flyers.); Lost OMJHL finals (Peterborough Petes) 8–6
1979–80	68	29	39	0	58	0.426	325	355	4th Emms	Won division quarterfinals (London Knights) 3–2; Lost division semifinals (Windsor Spitfites) 4–1
1980–81	68	30	36	2	62	0.456	354	359	4th Emms	Won division quarterfinals (Toronto Marlboros) 3–2; Lost division semifinals (Kitchener Rangers) 9–5
1981–82	68	31	34	3	65	0.478	311	338	4th Emms	Lost division quarterfinals (Windsor Spitfires) 6–4

== Sources ==
- Lapp, Richard M.; Macaulay, Alec (1997). The Memorial Cup: Canada's National Junior Hockey Championship. Madeira Park, British Columbia: Harbour Publishing. ISBN 1-55017-170-4.
