= Minneapolis Bruins =

- City: Minneapolis, Minnesota
- League: Central Professional Hockey League
- Operated: 1963 to 1965
- Home arena: Minneapolis Arena
- Colors: Black and yellow
- Affiliates: Boston Bruins

The Minneapolis Bruins were a minor league professional ice hockey team in the Central Professional Hockey League (CPHL) from 1963 to 1965.

The Bruins were one of the original five teams to enter the newly formed CPHL. Minneapolis operated as a farm team to the National Hockey League's Boston Bruins. The team originated as the Kingston Frontenacs of the Eastern Professional Hockey League, which transferred to the new CPHL essentially intact after the demise of the EPHL in 1963. The Minneapolis Bruins played two seasons in the league, then in 1965, the team relocated to Oklahoma City, Oklahoma, where it continued as the Oklahoma City Blazers until 1977.

== Ownership ==
The Minneapolis franchise was operated locally by three dedicated hockey fans: Walter Bush Jr., an attorney with a long association with amateur hockey which includes manager of the 1964 United States Olympic hockey team; Robert McNulty, a Minneapolis contractor; along with executive Gordon Ritz.

== Minneapolis Bruins all-time roster ==
  - Don Awrey — 1963/64
  - Ed Bartoli — 1963/65
  - Ron Boehm — 1964/65
  - Ron Buchanan — 1964/65
  - Gord Butterworth — 1963/64
  - Bob Champoux — 1964/65
  - Ray Clearwater — 1964/65
  - Bill Cooper — 1963/65
  - Terry Crisp — 1963/65
  - Wayne Doll — 1964/65
  - Gary Dornhoefer — 1963/64
  - John Favell — 1964/65
  - George Gardner — 1963/64
  - Jeannot Gilbert — 1963/64
  - Stan Gilbertson — 1964/65
  - Andre Gill — 1963/64
  - John Gravel — 1964/65
  - Gary Harmer — 1963/65
  - Bob Heaney — 1964/65
  - Ted Hodgson — 1964/65
  - Brenton Hughes — 1964/65
  - Ted Irvine — 1963/65
  - Bill Knibbs — 1963/65
  - Skip Krake — 1964/65
  - Bruce Lea — 1964/65
  - Ross Lonsberry — 1964/65
  - Larry Lund — 1964/65
  - Duncan MacDonald — 1964/65
  - Mike Mahoney — 1963/64
  - Cesare Maniago — 1964/65
  - Wayne Maxner — 1963/65
  - Dennis Morin — 1963/64
  - Jack Norris — 1963/64
  - Gerry Ouellette — 1963/65
  - Claude Ouimet — 1963/64
  - Pete Panagabko — 1963/65
  - Jean-Paul Parise — 1963/65
  - Dunc Rousseau — 1964/65
  - Wayne Schultz — 1963/65
  - Ron Schock — 1963/64
  - Harry Sinden — 1963/65
  - Ken Stephanson — 1963/65
  - Joe Watson — 1963/65
  - Allen Willis — 1963/64
  - Ron Willy — 1963/64
