= Mike Foligno =

Canadian ice hockey player (born 1959)

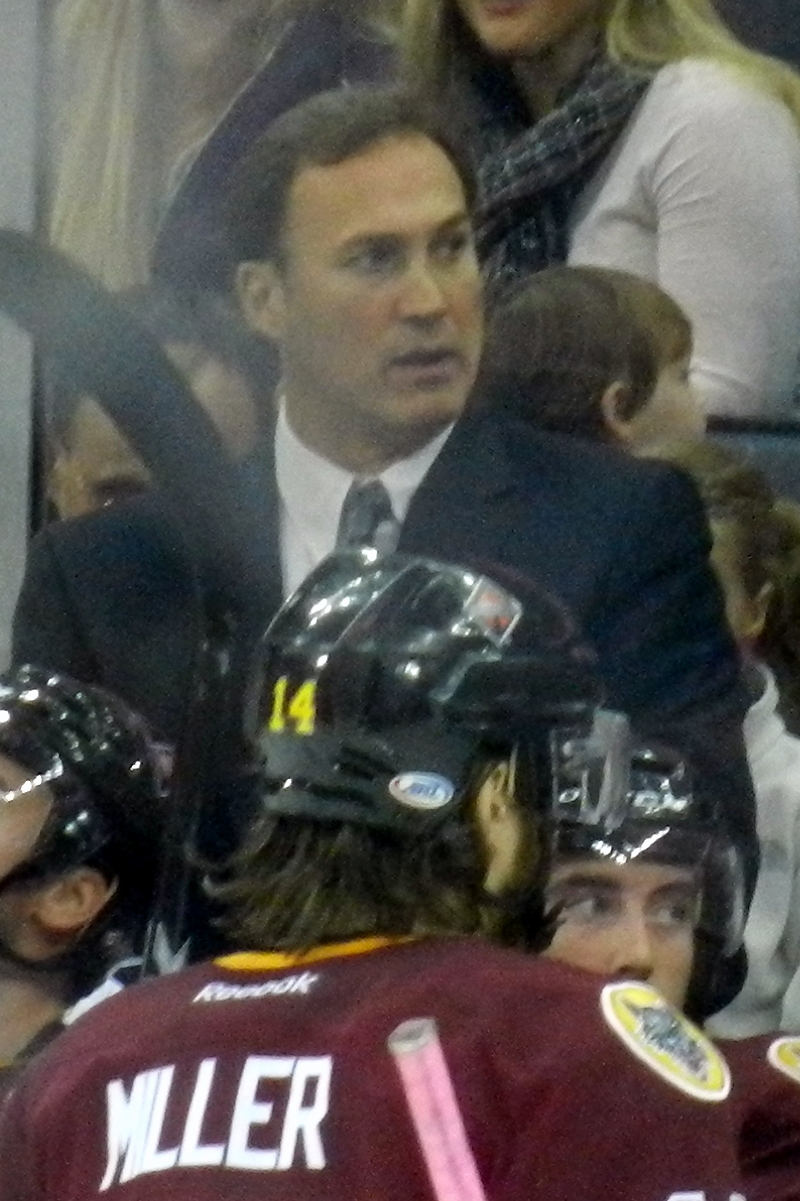
- Foligno in 2012
- Born: January 29, 1959 (age 67) Sudbury, Ontario, Canada
- Height: 6 ft 2 in (188 cm)
- Weight: 195 lb (88 kg; 13 st 13 lb)
- Position: Right wing
- Shot: Right
- Played for: Detroit Red Wings; Buffalo Sabres; Toronto Maple Leafs; Florida Panthers
- National team: Canada
- NHL draft: 3rd overall, 1979; Detroit Red Wings
- Playing career: 1979–1994

Michael Anthony Foligno (/foʊˈliːnoʊ/ foh-LEE-noh; born January 29, 1959) is a Canadian former professional ice hockey right winger who played in the National Hockey League for fifteen seasons from 1979–80 until 1993–94. He was a scout for the Vegas Golden Knights.

== Playing career ==
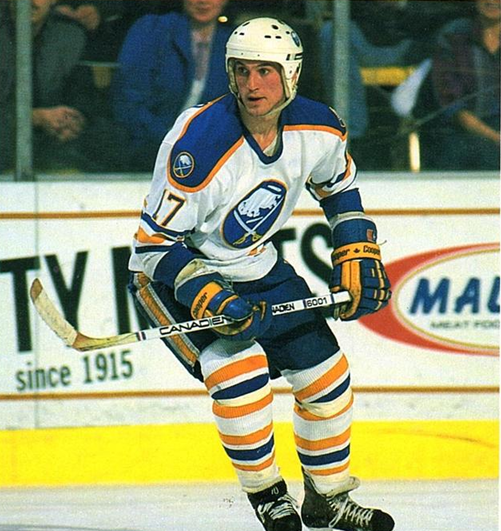
1980s photo of Foligno for Buffalo Sabres

Foligno was born in Sudbury, Ontario, but spent his early years in Italy where he took up the sport of soccer, participating as a goalkeeper. When Foligno returned to Canada with his family at the age of 10, he was introduced to hockey.

Foligno was drafted 3rd overall by the Detroit Red Wings in the 1979 NHL entry draft. He played 1018 career NHL games, scoring 355 goals and 372 assists for 727 points, while adding 2049 penalty minutes. His best offensive season was the 1985–86 season with the Buffalo Sabres, when he scored 41 goals and 80 points, both career highs. On December 23, 1991, while with the Maple Leafs, he broke his foot while playing against Winnipeg, causing him to miss a majority of the season.

Foligno is perhaps best known for his trademark jump, dubbed the "Foligno Leap", after scoring a goal. Both of his two sons have carried on the tradition of the Foligno Leap. Foligno is also known for the custom helmet he was required to wear throughout his career due to his fontanel not fully developing.

== Coaching and management career ==
Foligno has worked as an assistant coach for the Toronto Maple Leafs, Colorado Avalanche, Anaheim Ducks, and New Jersey Devils. He was previously the general manager of the Sudbury Wolves, and was also the head coach of the club, including the time when both of his sons, Nick and Marcus, played prior to playing in the NHL.

On September 21, 2016, it was announced that Foligno was hired as a scout for the expansion Vegas Golden Knights.

== Transactions ==
December 2, 1981: Traded to the Buffalo Sabres along with Dale McCourt and Brent Peterson in exchange for Danny Gare, Jim Schoenfeld and Derek Smith.
December 17, 1990: Traded to the Toronto Maple Leafs along with Buffalo's 8th round pick in the 1991 Draft (Tomas Kucharcik) in exchange for Brian Curran and Lou Franceschetti.
November 5, 1993: Traded to the Florida Panthers in exchange for cash.

== Career statistics ==
=== Regular season and playoffs ===
			Regular season					Playoffs
Season	Team	League	GP	G	A	Pts	PIM	GP	G	A	Pts	PIM
1975–76	Sudbury Wolves	OMJHL	57	22	14	36	45	16	4	3	7	6
1976–77	Sudbury Wolves	OMJHL	66	31	44	75	62	6	3	1	4	7
1977–78	Sudbury Wolves	OMJHL	67	47	39	86	112	—	—	—	—	—
1978–79	Sudbury Wolves	OMJHL	68	65	85	150	98	10	5	5	10	14
1979–80	Detroit Red Wings	NHL	80	36	35	71	109	—	—	—	—	—
1980–81	Detroit Red Wings	NHL	80	28	35	63	210	—	—	—	—	—
1981–82	Detroit Red Wings	NHL	26	13	13	26	28	—	—	—	—	—
1981–82	Buffalo Sabres	NHL	56	20	31	51	149	4	2	0	2	9
1982–83	Buffalo Sabres	NHL	66	22	25	47	135	10	2	3	5	39
1983–84	Buffalo Sabres	NHL	70	32	31	63	151	3	2	1	3	19
1984–85	Buffalo Sabres	NHL	77	27	29	56	154	5	1	3	4	12
1985–86	Buffalo Sabres	NHL	79	41	39	80	168	—	—	—	—	—
1986–87	Buffalo Sabres	NHL	75	30	29	59	176	—	—	—	—	—
1987–88	Buffalo Sabres	NHL	74	29	28	57	220	6	3	2	5	31
1988–89	Buffalo Sabres	NHL	75	27	22	49	156	5	3	1	4	21
1989–90	Buffalo Sabres	NHL	61	15	25	40	99	6	0	1	1	12
1990–91	Buffalo Sabres	NHL	31	4	5	9	42	—	—	—	—	—
1990–91	Toronto Maple Leafs	NHL	37	8	7	15	65	—	—	—	—	—
1991–92	Toronto Maple Leafs	NHL	33	6	8	14	50	—	—	—	—	—
1992–93	Toronto Maple Leafs	NHL	55	13	5	18	84	18	2	6	8	42
1993–94	Toronto Maple Leafs	NHL	4	0	0	0	4	—	—	—	—	—
1993–94	Florida Panthers	NHL	39	4	5	9	49	—	—	—	—	—
NHL totals			1,018	355	372	727	2,049	57	15	17	32	185

=== International ===
Year	Team	Event	GP	G	A	Pts	PIM
1981	Canada	WC	7	2	0	2	8
1986	Canada	WC	10	0	5	5	16
1987	Canada	WC	10	0	4	4	34
Senior totals			27	2	9	11	58

== Honors ==
Foligno was inducted into the Greater Buffalo Sports Hall of Fame in 2004.

== Coaching record ==
Team	Year	Regular season							Postseason
Team	Year	G	W	L	T	OTL	Pts	Finish	Result
HER	1998–99	80	37	32	10	1	85	3rd in Mid-Atlantic	Lost in first round
HER	1999–00	80	43	29	5	3	94	2nd in Mid-Atlantic	Lost in third round
HER	2000–01	80	34	39	4	3	75	5th in Mid-Atlantic	Lost in third round
HER	2001–02	80	36	27	11	6	89	2nd in South	Lost in second round
HER	2002–03	80	36	27	14	3	89	2nd in South	Lost in first round
SUD	2003–04	68	25	32	6	5	61	5th in Central	Lost in first round
SUD	2004–05	68	32	23	6	7	77	4th in Central	Lost in second round
SUD	2005–06	68	34	28	-	6	74	3rd in Central	Lost in second round
SUD	2006–07	68	29	30	-	9	67	3rd in Central	Lost in OHL Finals
SUD	2007–08	68	17	46	-	5	39	5th in Central	Missed playoffs
SUD	2008–09	68	26	35	-	7	59	5th in Central	Lost in first round
SUD	2009–10	68	26	35	-	7	59	5th in Central	Lost in first round

== Personal life ==
Foligno was married to wife Janis until her death in 2009 during his time as coach in Sudbury. They have four children together.

Foligno's sons, Nick and Marcus both play for the Minnesota Wild.

== See also ==
- List of NHL players with 1,000 games played
- List of NHL players with 2,000 career penalty minutes

Preceded by Willie Huber	Detroit Red Wings first-round draft pick 1979	Succeeded by Mike Blaisdell
Preceded by Lindy Ruff	Buffalo Sabres captain 1989–90	Succeeded by Mike Ramsey
