= Emms Trophy =

- Sport: Ice hockey
- Awarded for: Regular season champion, Central division

History
- First award: 1976
- Most wins: Barrie Colts (10)
- Most recent: Barrie Colts

The Emms Trophy is presented annually to the regular season champion of the Central division in the Ontario Hockey League. The trophy was inaugurated in the 1975–76 season for the winner of the Emms division, the more westerly of the two divisions at the time. When the league realigned into three divisions in 1994–95, it has since been awarded to the Central division.

The award is named in recognition of Hap Emms. Leighton "Hap" Emms was a coach, team owner, and general manager, with a 33 year presence in the Ontario Hockey Association, as the owner of the Barrie Flyers, Niagara Falls Flyers, and St. Catharines Black Hawks between 1945 and 1978. Teams that Emms coached or owned appeared in eight Memorial Cup tournaments, winning four Memorial Cups.

== Winners ==
List of winners of the Emms trophy.

Season	Team	GP	W	L	T	OTL	Pts	GF	GA
1975–76	Hamilton Fincups	66	43	15	8	—	94	379	232
1976–77	St. Catharines Fincups	66	50	11	5	—	105	438	242
1977–78	London Knights	68	35	22	11	—	81	333	251
1978–79	Niagara Falls Flyers	68	43	21	4	—	90	361	243
1979–80	Windsor Spitfires	68	36	31	1	—	73	323	344
1980–81	Kitchener Rangers	68	34	33	1	—	69	321	320
1981–82	Kitchener Rangers	68	44	21	3	—	91	322	247
1982–83	Sault Ste. Marie Greyhounds	70	48	21	1	—	97	363	270
1983–84	Kitchener Rangers	70	52	16	2	—	106	418	276
1984–85	Sault Ste. Marie Greyhounds	66	54	11	1	—	109	381	215
1985–86	North Bay Centennials	66	41	21	4	—	86	330	240
1986–87	North Bay Centennials	66	46	18	2	—	94	357	216
1987–88	Windsor Compuware Spitfires	66	50	14	2	—	102	396	215
1988–89	Kitchener Rangers	66	41	19	6	—	88	318	251
1989–90	London Knights	66	41	19	6	—	88	313	246
1990–91	Sault Ste. Marie Greyhounds	66	42	21	3	—	87	303	217
1991–92	Sault Ste. Marie Greyhounds	66	41	19	6	—	88	335	229
1992–93	Sault Ste. Marie Greyhounds	66	38	23	5	—	81	334	260
1993–94	Detroit Junior Red Wings	66	42	20	4	—	88	312	237
1994–95	Guelph Storm	66	47	14	5	—	99	330	200
1995–96	Guelph Storm	66	45	16	5	—	95	297	186
1996–97	Kitchener Rangers	66	34	22	10	—	78	274	235
1997–98	Guelph Storm	66	42	18	6	—	90	263	189
1998–99	Barrie Colts	68	49	13	6	—	104	343	192
1999–2000	Barrie Colts	68	43	18	6	1	93	306	212
2000–01	Sudbury Wolves	68	35	22	8	3	81	237	196
2001–02	Toronto St. Michael's Majors	68	40	19	8	1	89	230	177
2002–03	Brampton Battalion	68	34	24	6	4	78	239	202
2003–04	Toronto St. Michael's Majors	68	38	21	7	2	85	210	187
2004–05	Mississauga IceDogs	68	34	21	12	1	81	207	172
Season	Team	GP	W	L	OTL	SL	Pts	GF	GA
2005–06	Brampton Battalion	68	44	21	1	2	91	275	222
2006–07	Barrie Colts	68	48	19	0	1	97	273	193
2007–08	Brampton Battalion	68	42	22	1	3	88	259	187
2008–09	Brampton Battalion	68	47	19	1	1	96	264	184
2009–10	Barrie Colts	68	57	9	0	2	116	327	186
2010–11	Mississauga St. Michael's Majors	68	53	13	0	2	108	287	170
2011–12	Niagara IceDogs	68	47	18	0	3	97	291	169
2012–13	Barrie Colts	68	44	20	2	2	92	245	185
2013–14	North Bay Battalion	68	38	24	4	2	82	220	189
2014–15	Barrie Colts	68	41	24	1	2	85	278	227
2015–16	Barrie Colts	68	43	22	0	3	89	295	207
2016–17	Mississauga Steelheads	68	34	21	6	7	81	240	219
2017–18	Barrie Colts	68	42	21	4	1	89	297	229
2018–19	Niagara IceDogs	68	44	17	7	0	95	326	209
2019–20	Sudbury Wolves	63	34	27	1	1	70	259	240
2020–21	Not awarded, season cancelled due to COVID-19 pandemic								
2021–22	North Bay Battalion	68	43	18	3	4	93	267	198
2022–23	North Bay Battalion	68	48	17	2	1	99	285	183
2023–24	North Bay Battalion	68	39	20	7	2	87	300	240
2024–25	Barrie Colts	68	42	22	2	2	88	250	219
2025–26	Barrie Colts	68	45	14	5	4	99	246	194
