= Nick Ricci =

Canadian ice hockey player

- Born: June 3, 1959 (age 66) Niagara Falls, Ontario, Canada
- Height: 5 ft 10 in (178 cm)
- Weight: 160 lb (73 kg; 11 st 6 lb)
- Position: Goaltender
- Caught: Left
- Played for: Pittsburgh Penguins
- NHL draft: 94th overall, 1979; Pittsburgh Penguins
- Playing career: 1979–1985

Nicholas Joseph Ricci (born June 3, 1959) is a Canadian former professional ice hockey goaltender. He played 19 games for the Pittsburgh Penguins of the National Hockey League (NHL) between 1980 and 1983. The rest of his career, which lasted from 1979 to 1985, was mainly spent in the American Hockey League and International Hockey League.

== Playing career ==
Born in Niagara Falls, Ontario, Ricci played junior hockey for the Niagara Falls Flyers of the Ontario Major Junior Hockey League. He was drafted 94th overall in the 1979 NHL entry draft by the Pittsburgh Penguins and signed with their organization that summer. He played the 1979–80 season for the Grand Rapids Owls of the IHL, and was called up to the Penguins to play four games. For the next three seasons, Ricci played several games each year for the Penguins, but played mostly in the minors. In 1983, he was traded to the Toronto Maple Leafs, joining the Leafs' AHL affiliate, the St. Catharines Saints. He split the 1983–84 season with the Saints and the Muskegon Mohawks of the IHL, and played one final season in the IHL in 1984–85 with the Peoria Rivermen.

== Career statistics ==
=== Regular season and playoffs ===
			Regular season									Playoffs
Season	Team	League	GP	W	L	T	MIN	GA	SO	GAA	SV%	GP	W	L	MIN	GA	SO	GAA	SV%
1976–77	Niagara Falls Flyers	OMJHL	7	—	—	—	309	32	0	6.21	—	—	—	—	—	—	—	—	—
19788–79	Niagara Falls Flyers	OMJHL	52	—	—	—	3129	183	3	3.49	—	20	—	—	1172	54	1	2.66	—
1979–80	Pittsburgh Penguins	NHL	4	2	2	0	240	14	0	3.51	.898	—	—	—	—	—	—	—	—
1979–80	Grand Rapids Owls	IHL	29	—	—	—	1585	113	1	4.28	—	—	—	—	—	—	—	—	—
1980–81	Pittsburgh Penguins	NHL	9	4	5	0	536	35	0	3.92	.861	—	—	—	—	—	—	—	—
1980–81	Binghamton Whalers	AHL	8	2	4	0	359	34	0	5.68	.841	—	—	—	—	—	—	—	—
1981–82	Pittsburgh Penguins	NHL	3	0	3	0	158	14	0	5.32	.843	—	—	—	—	—	—	—	—
1981–82	Erie Blades	AHL	40	16	19	4	2254	175	0	4.66	—	—	—	—	—	—	—	—	—
1982–83	Pittsburgh Penguins	NHL	3	1	2	0	148	16	0	6.53	.789	—	—	—	—	—	—	—	—
1982–83	Baltimore Skipjacks	AHL	9	3	3	2	486	41	0	5.06	.871	—	—	—	—	—	—	—	—
1983–84	St. Catharines Saints	AHL	15	3	4	1	597	47	0	4.72	.854	—	—	—	—	—	—	—	—
1983–84	Muskegon Mohawks	IHL	13	1	11	1	764	59	0	4.63	—	—	—	—	—	—	—	—	—
1984–85	Peoria Rivermen	IHL	7	4	3	0	423	30	0	4.26	—	—	—	—	—	—	—	—	—
NHL totals			19	7	12	0	1080	79	0	4.39	.857	—	—	—	—	—	—	—	—

=== Awards ===
- 1979 F. W. "Dinty" Moore Trophy - OMJHL Award for top rookie goaltender
- 1979 Dave Pinkney Trophy (shared with Glen Ernst) - OMJHL award to team with best goals against average.
