= Kingston Frontenacs (EPHL) =

Old Frontenacs Logo

The Kingston Frontenacs of the Eastern Professional Hockey League (EPHL) were a minor league professional ice hockey team affiliated with the NHL's Boston Bruins.

The team was based in Kingston, Ontario, and played home games at the Kingston Memorial Centre. The Frontenacs existed from 1959 until 1963, winning the final EPHL championship in 1962-63. The Frontenacs played in all four EPHL seasons, and was among the most stable of the league's franchises. When the EPHL folded in 1963, the franchise was transferred to the new Central Hockey League as the Minneapolis Bruins.

Orval Tessier won two scoring titles with the Frontenacs, and voted the league's most valuable player and most sportsmanlike player in the 1961-62 season.

== NHL alumni ==
List of Kingston Frontenacs alumni to play in the National Hockey League.

- Barry Ashbee
- Bob Blackburn
- Don Blackburn
- Buddy Boone
- Charlie Burns
- Ed Chadwick
- Dick Cherry
- Real Chevrefils
- Wayne Connelly
- Glen Cressman
- Lorne Ferguson
- Reggie Fleming
- Bruce Gamble
- Cal Gardner
- Jeannot Gilbert
- Terry Gray
- Ted Green
- Floyd Hillman
- Bill Knibbs
- Jean Lamirande
- Bobby Leiter
- Harry Lumley
- Tom McCarthy
- Dick Meissner
- Willie O'Ree
- Gerry Ouellette
- J. P. Parise
- Cliff Pennington
- Dale Rolfe
- Wayne Rutledge
- Ron Schock
- Pat Stapleton
- Skip Teal
- Orval Tessier
- Tom Thurlby
- Ernie Wakely
- Ed Westfall
- Tom Williams
- Benny Woit
