= 1972–73 Eredivisie (ice hockey) season =

Dutch ice hockey season

The 1972–73 Eredivisie season was the 13th season of the Eredivisie, the top level of ice hockey in the Netherlands. Seven teams participated in the league, and the Tilburg Trappers won the championship.

== Regular season ==
	Club	GP	W	T	L	GF	GA	Pts
1.	Tilburg Trappers	12	12	0	0	124	40	24
2.	HC Hijs	12	9	1	2	76	52	19
3.	Nijmegen Tigers	12	6	1	5	50	63	13
4.	H.H.IJ.C. Den Haag	12	6	0	6	93	77	12
5.	S.IJ. Den Bosch	12	4	0	8	52	89	8
6.	Eaters Geleen	12	3	0	9	49	80	6
7.	Heerenveen Flyers	12	2	0	10	54	97	4
