= 1978–79 OMJHL season =

Canadian junior hockey season

The 1978–79 OMJHL season was the fifth season of the Ontario Major Junior Hockey League (OMJHL). The Hamilton Fincups moved to Brantford, Ontario, becoming the Alexanders. Twelve teams each played 68 games. The Peterborough Petes won the J. Ross Robertson Cup, defeating the Niagara Falls Flyers.

== League business ==
OMJHL commissioner Tubby Schmalz stated in July 1978, that the NHL–WHA merger would be the best situation for junior hockey. He hoped for government intervention to protect the Canadian Major Junior Hockey League after the results of an inquiry into junior hockey were made public. He stated that the National Hockey League had abided by verbal agreement not to sign junior players, but the World Hockey Association (WHA) continued to target juniors for talent, and referred to the recent signing of 16-year-old Wayne Gretzky to a contract. Schmalz contemplated legal action against Alan Eagleson and Birmingham Bulls owner John F. Bassett, for signing of junior-aged players under contract. Bassett felt that since players were 18 years old, they could be signed to a contract under Canadian laws. The lawsuit against Eagleson and the Birmingham Bulls was announced in September 1978, on behalf of the London Knights and the Sault Ste. Marie Greyhounds, and sued for "inducing breach of contract and wrongfully interfering with contractual relations".

In November 1978, the OMJHL transitioned from a part-time commissioner's role into a full-time position. Schmalz retired as of December 15, 1978, and was succeeded by Bill Beagan who had been commissioner of the International Hockey League. He took over a league whose teams were facing attendance and financial issues. He stated the targeting younger talent by the WHA was a threat to junior ice hockey, and sought to convince professional leagues that they are undermining their own future by signing players too young. In January 1979, Beagan felt the OMJHL would suffer from the Liquor Licence Board of Ontario ruling that breweries could no longer sponsor junior hockey, due to underage athletes on the teams. The OMJHL stood to lose $200,000 combined from Molson Brewery and the Labatt Brewing Company. Beagan petitioned the Government of Ontario to overturn the decision, stating the breweries had been good corporate citizens by supporting sports in Ontario.

Beagan's tenure with the OHL ended after 42 days, and he described his relationship in dealing with contract negotiations as "rocky". He stated, "They hired me to be captain. When I got there, I found out I was to be the second mate". The Canadian Press reported that Beagan claimed he resigned from the OMJHL, whereas the league stated was fired after six weeks on the job. A settlement was subsequently reached out of court. Sherwood Bassin from the Oshawa Generals was named the interim commissioner for the remainder of the season.

== Regular season ==
=== Final standings ===
Note: GP = Games played; W = Wins; L = Losses; T = Ties; GF = Goals for; GA = Goals against; PTS = Points; x = clinched playoff berth; y = clinched first round bye; z = clinched division title & first round bye

=== Leyden Division ===
Rank	Team	GP	W	L	T	PTS	GF	GA
1	z-Peterborough Petes	68	46	19	3	95	341	245
2	y-Sudbury Wolves	68	40	27	1	81	397	361
3	y-Oshawa Generals	68	37	30	1	75	367	326
4	x-Ottawa 67's	68	30	38	0	60	319	344
5	x-Kingston Canadians	68	26	38	4	56	265	306
6	Sault Ste. Marie Greyhounds	68	26	42	0	52	317	415

=== Emms Division ===
Rank	Team	GP	W	L	T	PTS	GF	GA
1	z-Niagara Falls Flyers	68	43	21	4	90	361	243
2	y-London Knights	68	37	29	2	76	310	287
3	y-Windsor Spitfires	68	32	35	1	65	323	322
4	x-Kitchener Rangers	68	29	35	4	62	316	356
5	x-Toronto Marlboros	68	27	40	1	55	308	351
6	Brantford Alexanders	68	23	42	3	49	281	349

=== Scoring leaders ===
Player	Team	GP	G	A	Pts	PIM
Mike Foligno	Sudbury Wolves	68	65	85	150	98
Tom McCarthy	Oshawa Generals	63	69	75	144	98
Art Rutland	Sault Ste. Marie Greyhounds	65	59	80	139	82
Brian Gualazzi	Sault Ste. Marie Greyhounds	68	74	60	134	42
Paul Reinhart	Kitchener Rangers	66	51	78	129	57
John Goodwin	Sault Ste. Marie Greyhounds	68	43	86	129	20
Dave MacQueen	Sudbury Wolves	65	60	66	126	98
Gary Dillon	Toronto Marlboros	59	57	63	120	40
Sean Simpson	Ottawa 67's	59	42	76	118	12
Blair Barnes	Windsor Spitfires	67	42	76	118	195

== Playoffs ==
The quarterfinal series between the London Knights and Windsor Spitfires originally ended with a 9-7 series victory for Windsor, but legal disputes over the eligibility of London forward Dean Hopkins after not being ejected from game 5 for spearing (instead getting a 5 minute major penalty) in the resulting 3-3 tie, and the further outcome of the series with Windsor winning three straight games, led to the OMJHL throwing the series out and advancing both teams to the semifinals. There, both teams faced the Niagara Falls Flyers in a round robin series to determine the Emms Division finalist. The initial semifinal series between Niagara Falls and Windsor alone had begun with a 3-3 tie, but that game was thrown out to resolve London's protests over the prior series.

First Round
L4	Ottawa 67s	4
L5	Kingston Canadians	6
E4	Kitchener Rangers	6
E5	Toronto Marlboros	0

Quarterfinals
L1	Peterborough Petes	9
L5	Kingston Canadians	5
Leyden Division
L2	Sudbury Wolves	8
L3	Oshawa Generals	2
L1	Niagara Falls Flyers	8
L4	Kitchener Rangers	6
Emms Division
L2	London Knights	7
L3	Windsor Spitfires	9

Semifinals
L1	Peterborough Petes	8
L2	Sudbury Wolves	2
E1	Niagara Falls Flyers	10
E2/3	London & Windsor	3/5

J. Ross Robertson Cup
L1	Peterborough Petes	8
E1	Niagara Falls Flyers	6

Emms Division Finals

Teams	GP	W	L	T	GF	GA	Pts
Niagara Falls Flyers	6	5	1	0	24	14	10
Windsor Spitfires	7	3	3	1	26	29	5
London Knights	7	1	5	1	24	33	3

== Awards ==
J. Ross Robertson Cup:	Peterborough Petes
Hamilton Spectator Trophy:	Peterborough Petes
Leyden Trophy:	Peterborough Petes
Emms Trophy:	Niagara Falls Flyers
Red Tilson Trophy:	Mike Foligno, Sudbury Wolves
Eddie Powers Memorial Trophy:	Mike Foligno, Sudbury Wolves
Matt Leyden Trophy:	Gary Green, Peterborough Petes
Jim Mahon Memorial Trophy:	Mike Foligno, Sudbury Wolves
Max Kaminsky Trophy:	Greg Theberge, Peterborough Petes
Dave Pinkney Trophy:	Nick Ricci and Glen Ernst, Niagara Falls Flyers
Emms Family Award:	John Goodwin, Sault Ste. Marie Greyhounds
F.W. 'Dinty' Moore Trophy:	Nick Ricci, Niagara Falls Flyers
William Hanley Trophy:	Sean Simpson, Ottawa 67's

== See also ==
- List of OHA Junior A standings
- List of OHL seasons
- 1979 Memorial Cup
- 1979 NHL entry draft
- 1978 in sports
- 1979 in sports

Preceded by 1977–78 OMJHL season	OHL seasons	Succeeded by 1979–80 OMJHL season
