= 1962–63 EPHL season =

The 1962–63 Eastern Professional Hockey League season was the fourth and final season of the Eastern Professional Hockey League, a North American minor professional league. Four teams participated in the regular season, and the Kingston Frontenacs were the league champions.

== Regular season ==
Eastern Professional Hockey League	GP	W	L	OTL	GF	GA	Pts
Kingston Frontenacs	72	42	19	11	300	229	95
Hull-Ottawa Canadiens	72	40	25	7	279	224	87
Sudbury Wolves	72	27	32	13	294	305	67
Syracuse/St. Louis Braves	72	26	37	9	275	304	61

== Playoffs ==
Semifinals			Final
2	Hull-Ottawa Canadians	0
3	Sudbury Wolves	3
3	Sudbury Wolves	3	1	Kingston Frontenacs	4
			3	Sudbury Wolves	1
