= 1968–69 NHL transactions =

The following is a list of all team-to-team transactions that have occurred in the National Hockey League during the 1968–69 NHL season. It lists what team each player has been traded to, signed by, or claimed by, and for which player(s) or draft pick(s), if applicable.

== Trades between teams ==
=== May ===
May 14, 1968	To Toronto Maple Leafs Terry Clancy	To Oakland Seals cash
May 14, 1968	To Oakland Seals cash	To New York Rangers rights to Larry Popein
May 20, 1968	To Boston Bruins 1st-rd pick - 1970 Amateur Draft (# 3 - Reggie Leach)	To Los Angeles Kings Skip Krake
May 21, 1968	To Boston Bruins 1st-rd pick - 1969 Amateur Draft (# 4 - Frank Spring) cash	To Pittsburgh Penguins Jean Pronovost; John Arbour
May 21, 1968	To Montreal Canadiens Wally Boyer; Alain Caron; 1st-rd pick - 1968 Amateur Draft (# 3 - Jim Pritchard); 1st-rd pick - 1970 Amateur Draft (# 5 - Ray Martyniuk) future considerations^{1} (Lyle Bradley)	To Oakland Seals Norm Ferguson; Stan Fuller future considerations^{1} (Francois Lacombe) (Michel Jacques)
May 23, 1968	To Toronto Maple Leafs Pierre Pilote	To Chicago Black Hawks Jim Pappin
May 27, 1968	To Oakland Seals Gary Jarrett; Doug Roberts; Chris Worthy; Howie Young	To Detroit Red Wings Bob Baun; Ron Harris

1. Trade completed in June, 1968 (exact date unknown).

=== June ===
June 6, 1968	To Toronto Maple Leafs cash	To Detroit Red Wings Doug Barrie
June 6, 1968	To Montreal Canadiens cash	To Minnesota North Stars Jake Rathwell
June 10, 1968	To Montreal Canadiens 1st-rd pick - 1972 Amateur Draft (# 8 - Dave Gardner) cash future considerations^{1} (Marshall Johnston)	To Minnesota North Stars Danny Grant; Claude Larose future considerations^{1} (Bob Murdoch)
June 10, 1968	To Montreal Canadiens 1st-rd pick - 1972 Amateur Draft (# 6 - Michel Larocque) future considerations^{2} (Tom Thurlby)	To Oakland Seals Bryan Watson cash
June 11, 1968	To St. Louis Blues Lou Angotti; Ian Campbell	To Philadelphia Flyers Darryl Edestrand; Gerry Melnyk
June 11, 1968	To St. Louis Blues Ab McDonald	To Pittsburgh Penguins Lou Angotti
June 11, 1968	To Montreal Canadiens Al MacNeil	To Pittsburgh Penguins Wally Boyer
June 11, 1968	To Montreal Canadiens cash	To Minnesota North Stars Jim Paterson rights to Claude Piche
June 11, 1968	To Los Angeles Kings Myron Stankiewicz	To St. Louis Blues Terry Gray
June 11, 1968	To Montreal Canadiens 1st-rd pick - 1969 Amateur Draft (MIN - # 5 - Dick Redmond)^{3} 1st-rd pick - 1972 Amateur Draft (# 4 - Steve Shutt)	To Los Angeles Kings Gerry Desjardins
June 11, 1968	To Montreal Canadiens cash	To St. Louis Blues Ted Ouimet
June 11, 1968	To Montreal Canadiens cash	To St. Louis Blues Kenneth Faranski
June 11, 1968	To Montreal Canadiens cash	To St. Louis Blues Gerald Lemire
June 12, 1968	To Montreal Canadiens 1st-rd pick - 1973 Amateur Draft (ATL - # 2 - Tom Lysiak)^{4} 2nd-rd pick - 1973 Amateur Draft (MIN - # 18 - Blake Dunlop)^{5}	To Oakland Seals opportunity to select Carol Vadnais in the 1968 waiver draft
June 12, 1968	To Minnesota North Stars Wayne Hillman; Joey Johnston; Dan Seguin	To New York Rangers Dave Balon
June 13, 1968	To St. Louis Blues Camille Henry; Robbie Irons; Bill Plager	To New York Rangers Don Caley; Wayne Rivers
June 27, 1968	To St. Louis Blues Seth Martin	To New York Rangers cash

Notes

1. Trade completed on May 25, 1971.
2. Trade completed in September, 1968 (exact date unknown).
3. This pick went to the Minnesota North Stars in exchange for Minnesota's promised to Montreal that they would not draft Dick Duff in the 1969 intra-league draft.
4. This pick went to the Atlanta Flames as the result of a trade on May 15, 1973, that sent Montreal's two first-round picks and second-round pick in 1973 NHL Amateur Draft to Atlanta in exchange for Atlanta's first-round pick in 1973 NHL Amateur Draft, first-round pick in 1977 NHL Amateur Draft and second-round pick in 1978 NHL Amateur Draft.
5. This pick went to the Minnesota North Stars as the result of a trade on May 15, 1973, that sent Minnesota's second-round pick in 1975 NHL Amateur Draft in exchange for this pick.

=== July ===
July 1, 1968	To Montreal Canadiens Yves Locas; Brian Smith	To Los Angeles Larry Cahan
July 4, 1968	To Oakland Seals George Konik	To Pittsburgh Penguins cash

=== August ===
August, 1968 (exact date unknown)	To Montreal Canadiens cash	To Oakland Seals Len Ronson

=== September ===
September, 1968 (exact date unknown)	To Pittsburgh Penguins cash	To Philadelphia Flyers loan of Bob Rivard
September 13, 1968	To Oakland Seals cash	To New York Rangers Ron Boehm
September 30, 1968	To Toronto Maple Leafs Louis Devault; Grant Moore	To Los Angeles Kings Gary Croteau; Brian Murphy; Wayne Thomas

=== October ===
October, 1968 (exact date unknown)	To Detroit Red Wings cash	To Pittsburgh Penguins Doug Barrie
October 1, 1968	To Minnesota North Stars 1st-rd pick - 1972 Amateur Draft (MTL - # 8 - Dave Gardner)^{1}	To Pittsburgh Penguins Bob Woytowich
October 10, 1968	To Los Angeles Kings Jimmy Peters Jr.	To Detroit Red Wings Terry Sawchuk
October 28, 1968	To Montreal Canadiens cash	To St. Louis Blues Norm Dennis

1. This pick went to the Montreal Canadiens as the result of a trade on June 10, 1968, that sent Minnesota's first-round pick in 1972, cash and future considerations (Marshall Johnston trade completed on May 25, 1971) to Montreal in exchange for Danny Grant, Claude Larose and future considerations (Bob Murdoch trade completed on May 25, 1971).
  Montreal received the lowest of Minnesota's two first-round pick.

=== November ===
November 12, 1968	To Los Angeles Kings Ron Anderson	To Detroit Red Wings Poul Popiel
November 15, 1968	To Montreal Canadiens cash	To Minnesota North Stars Brian Smith
November 22, 1968	To Montreal Canadiens Larry Hillman	To Pittsburgh Penguins Jean-Guy Lagace cash
November 29, 1968	To Oakland Seals Bob Dillabough	To Pittsburgh Penguins Billy Harris

=== December ===
December 1, 1968	To Chicago Black Hawks Brian Bradley	To Philadelphia Flyers Bob Sneddon

=== January ===
January 24, 1969	To Minnesota North Stars Leo Boivin	To Pittsburgh Penguins Duane Rupp
January 30, 1969	To Oakland Seals Earl Ingarfield Sr. Dick Mattiussi; Gene Ubriaco	To Minnesota North Stars Tracy Pratt; George Swarbrick; Bryan Watson

=== February ===
February 14, 1969	To Minnesota North Stars Bill Orban; Tom Reid future considerations^{1} (Doug Shelton)	To Chicago Black Hawks Andre Boudrias; Mike McMahon Jr.
February 15, 1969	To Minnesota North Stars Danny Lawson rights to Brian Conacher	To Detroit Red Wings Wayne Connolly

Notes

1. Trade completed in June 1969 (exact date unknown).

=== March ===
March 2, 1969	To Toronto Maple Leafs Forbes Kennedy; Brit Selby	To Philadelphia Flyers Mike Byers; Gerry Meehan; Bill Sutherland
