= 1968–69 Philadelphia Flyers season =

NHL hockey team season

1968–69 Philadelphia Flyers
- Division: 3rd West
- 1968–69 record: 20–35–21
- Home record: 14–16–8
- Road record: 6–19–13
- Goals for: 174 (12th)
- Goals against: 225 (7th)

Team information
- General manager: Bud Poile
- Coach: Keith Allen
- Captain: Vacant (Oct.–Nov.); Ed Van Impe (Nov.–Apr.)
- Alternate captains: Dick Cherry; Jean-Guy Gendron (Nov.–Apr.); Allan Stanley; Ed Van Impe (Oct.–Nov.)
- Arena: Spectrum
- Average attendance: 11,196
- Minor league affiliates: Quebec Aces; Seattle Totems; Jersey Devils

Team leaders
- Goals: Andre Lacroix (24)
- Assists: Jean-Guy Gendron (35)
- Points: Andre Lacroix (56)
- Penalty minutes: Forbes Kennedy (195)
- Plus/minus: Bill Sutherland (+5)
- Wins: Bernie Parent (17)
- Goals against average: Bernie Parent (2.70)

The 1968–69 Philadelphia Flyers season was the franchise's second season in the National Hockey League (NHL). The Flyers lost in the quarterfinals to the St. Louis Blues for the second consecutive season.

== Off-season ==
The Flyers coaxed Dick Cherry, who they selected in the 1967 NHL expansion draft, out of retirement by agreeing to a three-year contract.

Lou Angotti, the Flyers first captain, was involved in a three-team trade. The Flyers traded Angotti to the St. Louis Blues for Darryl Edestrand and Gerry Melnyk and the Blues subsequently traded Angotti to the Pittsburgh Penguins. Melnyk suffered a heart attack in training camp and retired to become a scout for the team.

The Flyers claimed veteran defenseman Allan Stanley in the reverse draft from the Toronto Maple Leafs.

== Regular season ==
Defenseman Ed Van Impe was named Angotti's replacement as captain in November.

Led by Van Impe and the team-leading 24 goals of Andre Lacroix, the Flyers struggled finishing 15 games under .500.

=== Season standings ===
West Division
		GP	W	L	T	GF	GA	DIFF	Pts
1	St. Louis Blues	76	37	25	14	204	157	+47	88
2	Oakland Seals	76	29	36	11	219	251	−32	69
3	Philadelphia Flyers	76	20	35	21	174	225	−51	61
4	Los Angeles Kings	76	24	42	10	185	260	−75	58
5	Pittsburgh Penguins	76	20	45	11	189	252	−63	51
6	Minnesota North Stars	76	18	43	15	189	270	−81	51

=== Record vs. opponents ===
==== Vs. West Division ====
1968–69 NHL records
Team	LAK	MIN	OAK	PHI	PIT	STL	Total
Los Angeles	—	1–4–3	4–2–2	3–4–1	5–2–1	1–6–1	14–18–8
Minnesota	4–1–3	—	3–4–1	2–3–3	3–5	2–4–2	14–17–9
Oakland	2–4–2	4–3–1	—	4–2–2	4–2–2	1–7	15–18–7
Philadelphia	4–3–1	3–2–3	2–4–2	—	4–1–3	1–6–1	14–16–10
Pittsburgh	2–5–1	5–3	2–4–2	1–4–3	—	3–4–1	13–20–7
St. Louis	6–1–1	4–2–2	7–1	6–1–1	4–3–1	—	27–8–5

==== Vs. East Division ====
1968–69 NHL records
Team	BOS	CHI	DET	MTL	NYR	TOR	Total
Los Angeles	1–5	1–5	2–4	0–4–2	3–3	3–3	10–24–2
Minnesota	0–4–2	0–5–1	2–4	0–5–1	1–5	1–3–2	4–26–6
Oakland	1–3–2	5–1	2–3–1	3–2–1	1–5	2–4	14–18–4
Philadelphia	2–4	0–3–3	1–3–2	1–5	1–3–2	1–1–4	6–19–11
Pittsburgh	1–5	2–4	2–4	1–4–1	1–5	0–3–3	7–25–4
St. Louis	2–2–2	2–3–1	4–0–2	0–5–1	1–3–2	1–4–1	10–17–9

== Playoffs ==
Despite the poor regular season showing, they made the playoffs; however, they were manhandled by St. Louis in a four-game sweep. Not wanting his team to be physically outmatched again, owner Ed Snider instructed general manager Bud Poile to acquire bigger, tougher players going forward.

== Schedule and results ==
=== Regular season ===
1968–69 regular season
October: 1–5–2 (home: 1–1–1; road: 0–4–1)

Game	Date	Score	Opponent	Decision	Attendance	Record	Points	Recap
1	October 13	2–3	@ Boston Bruins	Parent	14,011	0–1–0	0	L
2	October 16	1–3	@ New York Rangers	Favell	15,906	0–2–0	0	L
3	October 17	3–0	Pittsburgh Penguins	Parent	9,862	1–2–0	2	W
4	October 24	3–3	Minnesota North Stars	Parent	8,933	1–2–1	3	T
5	October 26	2–6	@ Los Angeles Kings	Favell	6,597	1–3–1	3	L
6	October 27	2–2	@ Oakland Seals	Favell	1,892	1–3–2	4	T
7	October 30	1–4	@ St. Louis Blues	Parent	10,754	1–4–2	4	L
8	October 31	1–2	New York Rangers	Parent	9,429	1–5–2	4	L

November: 5–8–0 (home: 3–5–0; road: 2–3–0)

Game	Date	Score	Opponent	Decision	Attendance	Record	Points	Recap
9	November 2	3–2	@ Toronto Maple Leafs	Parent	16,470	2–5–2	6	W
10	November 3	3–2	Montreal Canadiens	Parent	12,431	3–5–2	8	W
11	November 6	1–7	@ Boston Bruins	Parent	13,744	3–6–2	8	L
12	November 7	0–8	St. Louis Blues	Favell	9,164	3–7–2	8	L
13	November 9	3–0	@ Pittsburgh Penguins	Favell	7,284	4–7–2	10	W
14	November 13	3–4	@ Minnesota North Stars	Favell	10,918	4–8–2	10	L
15	November 14	4–2	Boston Bruins	Parent	10,192	5–8–2	12	W
16	November 17	3–1	Los Angeles Kings	Parent	9,125	6–8–2	14	W
17	November 21	0–3	Montreal Canadiens	Parent	11,269	6–9–2	14	L
18	November 23	1–2	Oakland Seals	Favell	11,932	6–10–2	14	L
19	November 24	1–3	Los Angeles Kings	Parent	9,086	6–11–2	14	L
20	November 27	2–5	Detroit Red Wings	Favell	11,380	6–12–2	14	L
21	November 30	0–1	@ St. Louis Blues	Parent	15,314	6–13–2	14	L

December: 3–6–5 (home: 1–2–3; road: 2–4–2)

Game	Date	Score	Opponent	Decision	Attendance	Record	Points	Recap
22	December 1	3–3	@ Detroit Red Wings	Parent	13,039	6–13–3	15	T
23	December 4	1–3	@ Los Angeles Kings	Parent	5,847	6–14–3	15	L
24	December 6	0–4	@ Oakland Seals	Favell	3,166	6–15–3	15	L
25	December 8	4–4	St. Louis Blues	Parent	10,329	6–15–4	16	T
26	December 12	0–1	Toronto Maple Leafs	Parent	8,531	6–16–4	16	L
27	December 14	0–1	@ Montreal Canadiens	Parent	16,584	6–17–4	16	L
28	December 15	3–1	@ New York Rangers	Parent	12,731	7–17–4	18	W
29	December 17	8–2	Pittsburgh Penguins	Parent	6,986	8–17–4	20	W
30	December 19	5–5	Minnesota North Stars	Parent	8,394	8–17–5	21	T
31	December 21	2–1	@ Los Angeles Kings	Favell	7,108	9–17–5	23	W
32	December 22	1–2	@ Oakland Seals	Favell	1,829	9–18–5	23	L
33	December 25	2–2	New York Rangers	Favell	9,545	9–18–6	24	T
34	December 27	3–3	@ Detroit Red Wings	Parent	11,935	9–18–7	25	T
35	December 29	1–2	Oakland Seals	Parent	12,767	9–19–7	25	L

January: 3–6–5 (home: 2–4–2; road: 1–2–3)

Game	Date	Score	Opponent	Decision	Attendance	Record	Points	Recap
36	January 2	2–2	Chicago Black Hawks	Favell	13,290	9–19–8	26	T
37	January 4	1–1	@ Pittsburgh Penguins	Favell	6,329	9–19–9	27	T
38	January 5	2–2	Toronto Maple Leafs	Parent	11,274	9–19–10	28	T
39	January 8	4–4	@ Toronto Maple Leafs	Favell	16,331	9–19–11	29	T
40	January 9	1–3	New York Rangers	Parent	10,147	9–20–11	29	L
41	January 11	4–2	@ Minnesota North Stars	Parent	12,462	10–20–11	31	W
42	January 15	3–4	@ St. Louis Blues	Favell	13,184	10–21–11	31	L
43	January 16	0–4	Montreal Canadiens	Parent	12,728	10–22–11	31	L
44	January 18	3–5	Boston Bruins	Favell	14,558	10–23–11	31	L
45	January 19	3–1	Detroit Red Wings	Parent	13,949	11–23–11	33	W
46	January 23	2–2	@ Chicago Black Hawks	Parent	18,500	11–23–12	34	T
47	January 25	3–6	@ Montreal Canadiens	Parent	16,884	11–24–12	34	L
48	January 26	5–3	Pittsburgh Penguins	Favell	10,987	12–24–12	36	W
49	January 30	0–12	Chicago Black Hawks	Favell	13,005	12–25–12	36	L

February: 1–8–4 (home: 1–4–1; road: 0–4–3)

Game	Date	Score	Opponent	Decision	Attendance	Record	Points	Recap
50	February 1	2–2	@ Pittsburgh Penguins	Parent	5,866	12–25–13	37	T
51	February 2	2–3	Minnesota North Stars	Parent	13,294	12–26–13	37	L
52	February 4	0–2	Detroit Red Wings	Parent	8,375	12–27–13	37	L
53	February 8	5–6	@ Boston Bruins	Parent	14,659	12–28–13	37	L
54	February 9	3–3	@ New York Rangers	Parent	5,723	12–28–14	38	T
55	February 12	3–3	@ Chicago Black Hawks	Parent	17,800	12–28–15	39	T
56	February 13	1–2	St. Louis Blues	Parent	9,362	12–29–15	39	L
57	February 15	0–3	Chicago Black Hawks	Parent	14,558	12–30–15	39	L
58	February 16	3–2	Oakland Seals	Parent	11,104	13–30–15	41	W
59	February 19	1–3	@ St. Louis Blues	Parent	15,072	13–31–15	41	L
60	February 22	1–4	@ Montreal Canadiens	Parent	17,304	13–32–15	41	L
61	February 23	1–9	@ Detroit Red Wings	Parent	14,361	13–33–15	41	L
62	February 27	1–1	Toronto Maple Leafs	Parent	11,935	13–33–16	42	T

March: 7–2–5 (home: 6–0–1; road: 1–2–4)

Game	Date	Score	Opponent	Decision	Attendance	Record	Points	Recap
63	March 1	2–2	@ Los Angeles Kings	Parent	9,534	13–33–17	43	T
64	March 2	4–4	@ Oakland Seals	Parent	4,484	13–33–18	44	T
65	March 6	5–1	Los Angeles Kings	Parent	9,428	14–33–18	46	W
66	March 8	2–2	@ Toronto Maple Leafs	Parent	16,485	14–33–19	47	T
67	March 9	5–3	Oakland Seals	Parent	13,885	15–33–19	49	W
68	March 13	2–1	Boston Bruins	Parent	14,558	16–33–19	51	W
69	March 15	2–2	@ Minnesota North Stars	Parent	14,662	16–33–20	52	T
70	March 16	2–6	@ Chicago Black Hawks	Parent	17,000	16–34–20	52	L
71	March 20	5–2	Minnesota North Stars	Parent	12,582	17–34–20	54	W
72	March 22	5–1	@ Minnesota North Stars	Parent	14,664	18–34–20	56	W
73	March 23	4–3	St. Louis Blues	Parent	14,558	19–34–20	58	W
74	March 27	4–2	Los Angeles Kings	Parent	11,669	20–34–20	60	W
75	March 29	3–3	Pittsburgh Penguins	Parent	11,039	20–34–21	61	T
76	March 30	1–2	@ Pittsburgh Penguins	Favell	5,738	20–35–21	61	L

Legend: W Win (2 points) L Loss (0 points) T Tie (1 point)

=== Playoffs ===
1969 Stanley Cup playoffs
Quarterfinals vs. St. Louis Blues – Blues win 4–0

Game	Date	Score	Opponent	Decision	Attendance	Series	Recap
1	April 2	2–5	@ St. Louis Blues	Parent	15,156	Blues lead 1–0	L
2	April 3	0–5	@ St. Louis Blues	Favell	15,261	Blues lead 2–0	L
3	April 5	0–3	St. Louis Blues	Parent	14,558	Blues lead 3–0	L
4	April 6	1–4	St. Louis Blues	Parent	10,995	Blues win 4–0	L

Legend: W Win L Loss

== Player statistics ==
=== Scoring ===
- Position abbreviations: C = Center; D = Defense; G = Goaltender; LW = Left wing; RW = Right wing
- † = Joined team via a transaction (e.g., trade, waivers, signing) during the season. Stats reflect time with the Flyers only.
- ‡ = Left team via a transaction (e.g., trade, waivers, release) during the season. Stats reflect time with the Flyers only.

No.	Player	Pos	Regular season						Playoffs					
No.	Player	Pos	GP	G	A	Pts	+/-	PIM	GP	G	A	Pts	+/-	PIM
7	Andre Lacroix	C	75	24	32	56	−12	4	4	0	0	0	−5	0
11	Jean-Guy Gendron	LW	74	20	35	55	−8	65	4	0	0	0	−5	6
21	Dick Sarrazin	RW	54	16	30	46	−7	14	4	0	0	0	−5	0
20	Jim Johnson	C	69	17	27	44	−5	20	3	0	0	0	−4	2
9	Leon Rochefort	RW	65	14	21	35	−7	10	3	0	0	0	−2	0
12	Gary Dornhoefer	RW	60	8	16	24	−20	80	4	0	1	1	0	20
10	Brit Selby‡	LW	63	10	13	23	−11	23	—	—	—	—	—	—
2	Ed Van Impe	D	68	7	12	19	−13	112	1	0	0	0	−1	17
17	Larry Hale	D	67	3	16	19	−24	28	4	0	0	0	−8	10
6	Allan Stanley	D	64	4	13	17	−4	28	3	0	1	1	0	4
8	Don Blackburn	LW	48	7	9	16	−13	36	4	0	0	0	−4	2
5	Dick Cherry	D	71	9	6	15	−11	18	4	1	0	1	−2	4
22	Forbes Kennedy‡	C	59	8	7	15	−25	195	—	—	—	—	—	—
15	Garry Peters	C	66	8	6	14	−20	49	4	1	1	2	0	16
14	Simon Nolet	RW	35	4	10	14	−10	8	—	—	—	—	—	—
4	John Miszuk	D	66	1	13	14	−6	70	4	0	0	0	−5	0
10	Bill Sutherland†	LW	12	7	3	10	5	4	4	1	1	2	−4	0
3	Joe Watson	D	60	2	8	10	−21	14	4	0	0	0	−5	0
19	Earl Heiskala	LW	21	3	3	6	−4	51	—	—	—	—	—	—
19	Rosaire Paiement	RW	27	2	4	6	−14	52	—	—	—	—	—	—
23	Myron Stankiewicz†	LW	19	0	5	5	−11	25	1	0	0	0	0	0
24	Ralph MacSweyn	D	24	0	4	4	4	6	4	0	0	0	−4	4
23	Gerry Meehan†	C	12	0	3	3	−1	4	4	0	0	0	−2	0
22	Mike Byers†	RW	5	0	2	2	−1	0	4	0	1	1	−2	0
14	Pat Hannigan‡	LW	7	0	1	1	−4	22	—	—	—	—	—	—
19	Serge Bernier	C	1	0	0	0	0	2	—	—	—	—	—	—
1	Doug Favell	G	21	0	0	0		4	1	0	0	0		0
16	Claude LaForge	LW	2	0	0	0	−2	0	—	—	—	—	—	—
30	Bernie Parent	G	58	0	0	0		8	3	0	0	0		0
24	Larry Zeidel‡	D	9	0	0	0	−3	6	—	—	—	—	—	—

=== Goaltending ===
No.	Player	Regular season											Playoffs									
No.	Player	GP	GS	W	L	T	SA	GA	GAA	SV%	SO	TOI	GP	GS	W	L	SA	GA	GAA	SV%	SO	TOI
30	Bernie Parent	58	56	17	23	16	2009	151	2.70	.925	1	3,357	3	3	0	3	94	12	4.01	.872	0	180
1	Doug Favell	21	20	3	12	5	731	71	3.58	.903	1	1,191	1	1	0	1	36	5	5.00	.861	0	60

== Awards and records ==
=== Awards ===
Type	Award/honor	Recipient	Ref
League (in-season)	NHL All-Star Game selection	Bernie Parent	
League (in-season)	NHL All-Star Game selection	Ed Van Impe	

=== Records ===
Among the franchise records set during the 1968–69 season, the Flyers had two tie-related streaks. They tied four games in a row from January 2 to January 8, which was matched during the 1991–92 season, and they tied four road games in a row from March 1 to March 15. On January 30, they allowed 12 goals against to the Chicago Black Hawks, a single game franchise high. Their six road wins on the season is tied for the fewest in franchise history with the 1969–70 team.

=== Milestones ===
Milestone	Player	Date	Ref
First game	Larry Hale	October 13, 1968	
First game	Earl Heiskala	October 13, 1968	
First game	Dick Sarrazin	November 27, 1968	
First game	Serge Bernier	February 27, 1969	

== Transactions ==
The Flyers were involved in the following transactions from May 12, 1968, the day after the deciding game of the 1968 Stanley Cup Final, through May 4, 1969, the day of the deciding game of the 1969 Stanley Cup Final.

=== Trades ===
Date	Details		Ref
May 20, 1968	To Philadelphia Flyers: Earl Heiskala	To Seattle Totems (WHL): Loan of Bob Courcy; Loan of Ray LaRose; Future considerations (Note: The Flyers sent John Hanna and Art Stratton to Seattle on June 13 to complete trade.)	
June 11, 1968	To Philadelphia Flyers: Darryl Edestrand; Gerry Melnyk	To St. Louis Blues: Lou Angotti; Ian Campbell	
June 13, 1968	To Philadelphia Flyers: Brian Bradley	To Seattle Totems (WHL): cash	
August 21, 1968	To Philadelphia Flyers: Loan of Bobby Rivard	To Pittsburgh Penguins: cash	
October 18, 1968	To Philadelphia Flyers: cash	To Vancouver Canucks (WHL): Al Millar	
December 1968	To Philadelphia Flyers: cash	To Quebec Aces (AHL): Keith Wright	
December 2, 1968	To Philadelphia Flyers: Bob Sneddon	To Chicago Black Hawks: Brian Bradley	
March 2, 1968	To Philadelphia Flyers: cash	To Vancouver Canucks (WHL): Pat Hannigan	
March 2, 1968	To Philadelphia Flyers: Mike Byers; Gerry Meehan; Bill Sutherland	To Toronto Maple Leafs: Forbes Kennedy; Brit Selby	

=== Players acquired ===
Date	Player	Former team	Via	Ref
June 12, 1968	Ron Buchanan	Boston Bruins	Intra-league draft	
June 12, 1968	Larry Hale	Minnesota North Stars	Intra-league draft	
June 13, 1968	Allan Stanley	Toronto Maple Leafs	Reverse draft (Note: Stanley was selected by the Flyers' AHL affiliate, the Quebec Aces.)	
September 1968	Bobby Taylor	Calgary Spurs (AJHL)	Free agency	
September 18, 1968	Jean Lapointe	Laval Saints (QMJHL)	Free agency	
September 18, 1968	Bill McEwan		Free agency	
January 3, 1969	Myron Stankiewicz	St. Louis Blues	Waivers	

=== Players lost ===
Date	Player	New team	Via	Ref
June 12, 1968	Jean Gauthier	Boston Bruins	Intra-league draft	
June 12, 1968	Fern Rivard	Minnesota North Stars	Intra-league draft	
June 12, 1968	Bill Sutherland	Minnesota North Stars	Intra-league draft	
June 13, 1968	Jim Morrison	Baltimore Clippers (AHL)	Reverse draft	
June 13, 1968	Ed Hoekstra	Denver Spurs (WHL)	Reverse draft	
October 7, 1968	Gerry Melnyk		Retirement	
December 13, 1968	Larry Zeidel (Note: Zeidel refused an assignment to the Quebec Aces and retired.)		Release	

=== Signings ===
Date	Player	Term	Ref
May 27, 1968	Dick Cherry	3-year	
September 18, 1968	Dunc Wilson		
September 20, 1968	Darryl Edestrand	1-year	
September 20, 1968	Doug Favell	1-year	
September 20, 1968	Simon Nolet	1-year	
September 20, 1968	Brit Selby	2-year	
October 5, 1968	Ralph MacSweyn		
October 5, 1968	Bobby Rivard		
October 8, 1968	Forbes Kennedy		
October 8, 1968	Garry Peters		
October 9, 1968	Gary Dornhoefer		
October 9, 1968	Jim Johnson		
October 9, 1968	Rosaire Paiement		
October 11, 1968	Don Blackburn		
October 11, 1968	Leon Rochefort	1-year	
October 12, 1968	Larry Hale	1-year	
October 15, 1968	Andre Lacroix		

== Draft picks ==
=== NHL amateur draft ===
Philadelphia's picks at the 1968 NHL amateur draft, which was held at the Queen Elizabeth Hotel in Montreal, on June 13, 1968.

Round	Pick	Player	Position	Nationality	Team (league)
1	8	Lew Morrison	Right wing	Canada	Flin Flon Bombers (WCHL)

=== NHL special internal amateur draft ===
Philadelphia's picks at the 1968 NHL special internal amateur draft, which was held at the Queen Elizabeth Hotel in Montreal, Quebec, on June 13, 1968. Sponsored players aged 20 before May 31, 1968, who played as amateurs during the 1967–68 season were eligible for selection.

Player	Position	Nationality	Team (league)	NHL rights
Dunc Wilson	Goaltender	Canada	Oshawa Generals (OHA)	Boston Bruins

== Farm teams ==
The Flyers were affiliated with the Quebec Aces of the AHL, the Seattle Totems of the WHL, and the Jersey Devils of the EHL.
