= Larry Hale =

Canadian ice hockey player (1941–2019)

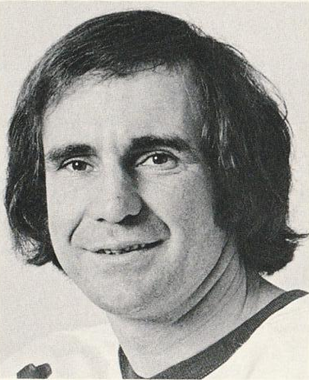
- Born: October 9, 1941 Summerland, British Columbia, Canada
- Died: September 27, 2019 (aged 77) Penticton, British Columbia, Canada
- Height: 6 ft 1 in (185 cm)
- Weight: 187 lb (85 kg; 13 st 5 lb)
- Position: Defence
- Shot: Left
- Played for: Philadelphia Flyers; Houston Aeros
- Playing career: 1962–1979

Larry James Hale (October 9, 1941 – September 27, 2019) was a Canadian professional ice hockey defenceman who played four seasons in the National Hockey League (NHL) with the Philadelphia Flyers from 1968 to 1972 and six seasons in the World Hockey Association (WHA) with the Houston Aeros from 1972 to 1978. He retired to Penticton, British Columbia later in his life, and died there in 2019 at the age of 77.

== Career statistics ==
=== Regular season and playoffs ===
			Regular season					Playoffs
Season	Team	League	GP	G	A	Pts	PIM	GP	G	A	Pts	PIM
1960–61	Edmonton Oil Kings	CAHL	—	—	—	—	—	—	—	—	—	—
1960–61	Edmonton Oil Kings	M-Cup	—	—	—	—	—	14	2	5	7	8
1961–62	Edmonton Oil Kings	CAHL	—	—	—	—	—	—	—	—	—	—
1961–62	Edmonton Oil Kings	M-Cup	—	—	—	—	—	21	5	11	16	17
1962–63	Minneapolis Millers	IHL	70	5	30	35	49	12	1	4	5	14
1963–64	Seattle Totems	WHL	70	5	16	21	46	—	—	—	—	—
1964–65	Seattle Totems	WHL	70	3	15	18	66	7	0	2	2	6
1965–66	Seattle Totems	WHL	72	3	11	14	36	—	—	—	—	—
1966–67	Seattle Totems	WHL	72	3	23	26	50	10	2	4	6	13
1967–68	Seattle Totems	WHL	70	9	19	28	41	9	1	8	9	10
1968–69	Philadelphia Flyers	NHL	67	3	16	19	28	4	0	0	0	10
1969–70	Philadelphia Flyers	NHL	53	1	9	10	28	—	—	—	—	—
1969–70	Quebec Aces	AHL	20	0	14	14	44	—	—	—	—	—
1970–71	Philadelphia Flyers	NHL	70	1	11	12	34	4	0	0	0	2
1971–72	Philadelphia Flyers	NHL	6	0	1	1	0	—	—	—	—	—
1971–72	Richmond Robins	AHL	68	11	33	44	68	—	—	—	—	—
1972–73	Houston Aeros	WHA	68	4	26	30	65	10	1	2	3	2
1973–74	Houston Aeros	WHA	69	2	14	16	39	14	3	2	5	6
1974–75	Houston Aeros	WHA	76	2	18	20	40	13	0	4	4	0
1975–76	Houston Aeros	WHA	77	2	12	14	30	17	0	5	5	8
1976–77	Houston Aeros	WHA	67	0	14	14	18	11	0	2	2	6
1977–78	Houston Aeros	WHA	56	2	11	13	22	—	—	—	—	—
1978–79	Spokane Flyers	PHL	54	0	18	18	30	—	—	—	—	—
WHA totals			413	12	95	107	214	65	4	15	19	22
NHL totals			196	5	37	42	90	8	0	0	0	12
