= 1968–69 Minnesota North Stars season =

National Hockey League team season

1968–69 Minnesota North Stars
- Division: 6th West
- 1968–69 record: 18–43–15
- Home record: 11–21–6
- Road record: 7–22–9
- Goals for: 189
- Goals against: 270

Team information
- General manager: Wren Blair
- Coach: Wren Blair; John Muckler
- Captain: Elmer Vasko
- Alternate captains: Ray Cullen; Wayne Connelly; Mike McMahon Jr.
- Arena: Met Center

Team leaders
- Goals: Danny Grant (34)
- Assists: Ray Cullen (38)
- Points: Danny Grant (65)
- Penalty minutes: Bill Goldsworthy (110)
- Wins: Cesare Maniago (18)
- Goals against average: Cesare Maniago (3.29)

The 1968–69 Minnesota North Stars season was the North Stars' second season.

Coached by Wren Blair (12–20–9) and John Muckler (6–23–6), the team compiled a record of 18–43–15 for 51 points, to finish the regular season 6th in the West Division, and failed to qualify for the playoffs.

== Regular season ==
=== Final standings ===
West Division
		GP	W	L	T	GF	GA	DIFF	Pts
1	St. Louis Blues	76	37	25	14	204	157	+47	88
2	Oakland Seals	76	29	36	11	219	251	−32	69
3	Philadelphia Flyers	76	20	35	21	174	225	−51	61
4	Los Angeles Kings	76	24	42	10	185	260	−75	58
5	Pittsburgh Penguins	76	20	45	11	189	252	−63	51
6	Minnesota North Stars	76	18	43	15	189	270	−81	51

=== Record vs. opponents ===
==== Vs. West Division ====
1968–69 NHL records
Team	LAK	MIN	OAK	PHI	PIT	STL	Total
Los Angeles	—	1–4–3	4–2–2	3–4–1	5–2–1	1–6–1	14–18–8
Minnesota	4–1–3	—	3–4–1	2–3–3	3–5	2–4–2	14–17–9
Oakland	2–4–2	4–3–1	—	4–2–2	4–2–2	1–7	15–18–7
Philadelphia	4–3–1	3–2–3	2–4–2	—	4–1–3	1–6–1	14–16–10
Pittsburgh	2–5–1	5–3	2–4–2	1–4–3	—	3–4–1	13–20–7
St. Louis	6–1–1	4–2–2	7–1	6–1–1	4–3–1	—	27–8–5

==== Vs. East Division ====
1968–69 NHL records
Team	BOS	CHI	DET	MTL	NYR	TOR	Total
Los Angeles	1–5	1–5	2–4	0–4–2	3–3	3–3	10–24–2
Minnesota	0–4–2	0–5–1	2–4	0–5–1	1–5	1–3–2	4–26–6
Oakland	1–3–2	5–1	2–3–1	3–2–1	1–5	2–4	14–18–4
Philadelphia	2–4	0–3–3	1–3–2	1–5	1–3–2	1–1–4	6–19–11
Pittsburgh	1–5	2–4	2–4	1–4–1	1–5	0–3–3	7–25–4
St. Louis	2–2–2	2–3–1	4–0–2	0–5–1	1–3–2	1–4–1	10–17–9

== Schedule and results ==
1968–69 regular season
October

Game	Result	Date	Score	Opponent	Record
1	W	October 11, 1968	5–1	@ Oakland Seals (1968–69)	1–0–0
2	L	October 16, 1968	4–10	@ Chicago Black Hawks (1968–69)	1–1–0
3	L	October 17, 1968	1–3	Montreal Canadiens (1968–69)	1–2–0
4	W	October 19, 1968	4–1	Los Angeles Kings (1968–69)	2–2–0
5	L	October 22, 1968	2–3	Oakland Seals (1968–69)	2–3–0
6	T	October 24, 1968	3–3	@ Philadelphia Flyers (1968–69)	2–3–1
7	L	October 26, 1968	0–3	New York Rangers (1968–69)	2–4–1
8	L	October 30, 1968	2–4	Boston Bruins (1968–69)	2–5–1

November

Game	Result	Date	Score	Opponent	Record
9	W	November 2, 1968	2–0	@ St. Louis Blues (1968–69)	3–5–1
10	L	November 3, 1968	1–2	@ New York Rangers (1968–69)	3–6–1
11	L	November 6, 1968	0–1	Toronto Maple Leafs (1968–69)	3–7–1
12	L	November 7, 1968	2–5	@ Detroit Red Wings (1968–69)	3–8–1
13	W	November 9, 1968	6–4	Detroit Red Wings (1968–69)	4–8–1
14	W	November 13, 1968	4–3	Philadelphia Flyers (1968–69)	5–8–1
15	W	November 16, 1968	3–2	Los Angeles Kings (1968–69)	6–8–1
16	T	November 17, 1968	3–3	@ St. Louis Blues (1968–69)	6–8–2
17	L	November 20, 1968	0–2	Chicago Black Hawks (1968–69)	6–9–2
18	L	November 23, 1968	3–4	@ Montreal Canadiens (1968–69)	6–10–2
19	L	November 24, 1968	0–6	@ Chicago Black Hawks (1968–69)	6–11–2
20	T	November 27, 1968	3–3	Oakland Seals (1968–69)	6–11–3
21	T	November 30, 1968	3–3	@ Toronto Maple Leafs (1968–69)	6–11–4

December

Game	Result	Date	Score	Opponent	Record
22	L	December 1, 1968	0–4	@ Boston Bruins (1968–69)	6–12–4
23	L	December 4, 1968	2–4	Toronto Maple Leafs (1968–69)	6–13–4
24	L	December 7, 1968	2–3	@ Los Angeles Kings (1968–69)	6–14–4
25	W	December 8, 1968	4–1	@ Oakland Seals (1968–69)	7–14–4
26	L	December 11, 1968	2–4	Pittsburgh Penguins (1968–69)	7–15–4
27	W	December 14, 1968	4–1	New York Rangers (1968–69)	8–15–4
28	L	December 15, 1968	2–5	@ Detroit Red Wings (1968–69)	8–16–4
29	L	December 17, 1968	2–3	Oakland Seals (1968–69)	8–17–4
30	T	December 19, 1968	5–5	@ Philadelphia Flyers (1968–69)	8–17–5
31	W	December 21, 1968	3–1	@ Pittsburgh Penguins (1968–69)	9–17–5
32	L	December 22, 1968	2–4	@ New York Rangers (1968–69)	9–18–5
33	L	December 25, 1968	0–2	St. Louis Blues (1968–69)	9–19–5
34	T	December 26, 1968	4–4	@ Los Angeles Kings (1968–69)	9–19–6
35	L	December 28, 1968	2–5	Chicago Black Hawks (1968–69)	9–20–6
36	L	December 31, 1968	3–6	@ Detroit Red Wings (1968–69)	9–21–6

January

Game	Result	Date	Score	Opponent	Record
37	T	January 4, 1969	2–2	Boston Bruins (1968–69)	9–21–7
38	L	January 5, 1969	1–5	@ New York Rangers (1968–69)	9–22–7
39	L	January 7, 1969	3–6	Montreal Canadiens (1968–69)	9–23–7
40	L	January 9, 1969	2–7	@ Pittsburgh Penguins (1968–69)	9–24–7
41	L	January 11, 1969	2–4	Philadelphia Flyers (1968–69)	9–25–7
42	L	January 12, 1969	0–2	St. Louis Blues (1968–69)	9–26–7
43	L	January 15, 1969	1–3	Pittsburgh Penguins (1968–69)	9–27–7
44	L	January 16, 1969	1–5	@ Boston Bruins (1968–69)	9–28–7
45	L	January 19, 1969	1–3	St. Louis Blues (1968–69)	9–29–7
46	W	January 23, 1969	3–1	@ Pittsburgh Penguins (1968–69)	10–29–7
47	W	January 25, 1969	3–2	Los Angeles Kings (1968–69)	11–29–7
48	L	January 26, 1969	3–4	@ Boston Bruins (1968–69)	11–30–7
49	L	January 29, 1969	0–4	@ Montreal Canadiens (1968–69)	11–31–7

February

Game	Result	Date	Score	Opponent	Record
50	T	February 1, 1969	5–5	Chicago Black Hawks (1968–69)	11–31–8
51	W	February 2, 1969	3–2	@ Philadelphia Flyers (1968–69)	12–31–8
52	T	February 5, 1969	5–5	@ Toronto Maple Leafs (1968–69)	12–31–9
53	L	February 8, 1969	3–6	Montreal Canadiens (1968–69)	12–32–9
54	W	February 9, 1969	3–1	Pittsburgh Penguins (1968–69)	13–32–9
55	L	February 12, 1969	1–7	@ Toronto Maple Leafs (1968–69)	13–33–9
56	W	February 15, 1969	6–2	Detroit Red Wings (1968–69)	14–33–9
57	L	February 16, 1969	0–6	@ St. Louis Blues (1968–69)	14–34–9
58	W	February 19, 1969	7–4	Los Angeles Kings (1968–69)	15–34–9
59	W	February 23, 1969	7–2	Toronto Maple Leafs (1968–69)	16–34–9
60	T	February 24, 1969	1–1	@ Los Angeles Kings (1968–69)	16–34–10
61	L	February 26, 1969	5–6	@ Oakland Seals (1968–69)	16–35–10

March

Game	Result	Date	Score	Opponent	Record
62	L	March 1, 1969	2–4	Detroit Red Wings (1968–69)	16–36–10
63	L	March 3, 1969	1–6	@ Chicago Black Hawks (1968–69)	16–37–10
64	W	March 5, 1969	5–2	Oakland Seals (1968–69)	17–37–10
65	T	March 9, 1969	2–2	St. Louis Blues (1968–69)	17–37–11
66	T	March 11, 1969	3–3	Boston Bruins (1968–69)	17–37–12
67	T	March 13, 1969	4–4	@ Montreal Canadiens (1968–69)	17–37–13
68	T	March 15, 1969	2–2	Philadelphia Flyers (1968–69)	17–37–14
69	W	March 16, 1969	3–2	@ St. Louis Blues (1968–69)	18–37–14
70	L	March 19, 1969	2–4	New York Rangers (1968–69)	18–38–14
71	L	March 20, 1969	2–5	@ Philadelphia Flyers (1968–69)	18–39–14
72	L	March 22, 1969	1–5	Philadelphia Flyers (1968–69)	18–40–14
73	L	March 23, 1969	0–5	@ Pittsburgh Penguins (1968–69)	18–41–14
74	L	March 25, 1969	1–3	Pittsburgh Penguins (1968–69)	18–42–14
75	L	March 29, 1969	2–7	@ Oakland Seals (1968–69)	18–43–14
76	T	March 30, 1969	3–3	@ Los Angeles Kings (1968–69)	18–43–15

Legend: Win (2 points) Loss (0 points) Tie (1 point)

== Draft picks ==
Minnesota's draft picks at the 1968 NHL amateur draft held at the Queen Elizabeth Hotel in Montreal.

Round	#	Player	Nationality	College/Junior/Club team (League)
1	5	Jim Benzelock	Canada	Winnipeg Jets (WCHL)
2	15	Marc Rioux	Canada	Verdun Maple Leafs (QJHL)
3	22	Glen Lindsay	Canada	Saskatoon Blades (WCHL)

== See also ==
- 1968–69 NHL season
