= 1968–69 Montreal Canadiens season =

NHL hockey team season (won 16th Stanley Cup)

1968–69 Montreal Canadiens
- Stanley Cup champions
- East Division champions
- Division: 1st East
- 1968–69 record: 46–19–11
- Home record: 26–7–5
- Road record: 20–12–6
- Goals for: 271
- Goals against: 202

Team information
- General manager: Sam Pollock
- Coach: Claude Ruel
- Captain: Jean Beliveau
- Alternate captains: Henri Richard; Unknown
- Arena: Montreal Forum

Team leaders
- Goals: Yvan Cournoyer (43)
- Assists: Jean Beliveau (49)
- Points: Yvan Cournoyer (87)
- Penalty minutes: John Ferguson (185)
- Wins: Gump Worsley (19)
- Goals against average: Gump Worsley (2.26)

The 1968–69 Montreal Canadiens season was the club's 60th season of play. The Canadiens would defeat the St. Louis Blues to win their 16th Stanley Cup championship in club history.

== Regular season ==
=== Final standings ===
East Division
		GP	W	L	T	GF	GA	DIFF	Pts
1	Montreal Canadiens	76	46	19	11	271	202	+69	103
2	Boston Bruins	76	42	18	16	303	221	+82	100
3	New York Rangers	76	41	26	9	231	196	+35	91
4	Toronto Maple Leafs	76	35	26	15	234	217	+17	85
5	Detroit Red Wings	76	33	31	12	239	221	+18	78
6	Chicago Black Hawks	76	34	33	9	280	246	+34	77

=== Record vs. opponents ===
==== Vs. East Division ====
1968–69 NHL records
Team	BOS	CHI	DET	MTL	NYR	TOR	Total
Boston	—	5–2–1	3–2–3	4–2–2	3–3–2	4–2–2	19–11–10
Chicago	2–5–1	—	3–4–1	1–7	4–3–1	3–4–1	13–23–4
Detroit	2–3–3	4–3–1	—	2–5–1	4–3–1	3–4–1	15–18–7
Montreal	2–4–2	7–1	5–2–1	—	3–4–1	4–3–1	21–14–5
New York	3–3–2	3–4–1	3–4–1	4–3–1	—	4–4	17–18–5
Toronto	2–4–2	4–3–1	4–3–1	3–4–1	4–4	—	17–18–5

==== Vs. West Division ====
1968–69 NHL records
Team	LAK	MIN	OAK	PHI	PIT	STL	Total
Boston	5–1	4–0–2	3–1–2	4–2	5–1	2–2–2	23–7–6
Chicago	5–1	5–0–1	1–5	3–0–3	4–2	3–2–1	21–10–5
Detroit	4–2	4–2	3–2–1	3–1–2	4–2	0–4–2	18–13–5
Montreal	4–0–2	5–0–1	2–3–1	5–1	4–1–1	5–0–1	25–5–6
New York	3–3	5–1	5–1	3–1–2	5–1	3–1–2	24–8–4
Toronto	3–3	3–1–2	4–2	1–1–4	3–0–3	4–1–1	18–8–10

== Schedule and results ==
1968–69 regular season
October

Game	Result	Date	Score	Opponent	Record
1	T	October 12, 1968	1–1	@ Pittsburgh Penguins (1968–69)	0–0–1
2	W	October 16, 1968	4–2	@ St. Louis Blues (1968–69)	1–0–1
3	W	October 17, 1968	3–1	@ Minnesota North Stars (1968–69)	2–0–1
4	W	October 20, 1968	4–2	@ Detroit Red Wings (1968–69)	3–0–1
5	W	October 23, 1968	5–2	@ Los Angeles Kings (1968–69)	4–0–1
6	W	October 25, 1968	4–2	@ Oakland Seals (1968–69)	5–0–1
7	L	October 27, 1968	2–4	@ Boston Bruins (1968–69)	5–1–1
8	W	October 30, 1968	5–0	@ Toronto Maple Leafs (1968–69)	6–1–1

November

Game	Result	Date	Score	Opponent	Record
9	W	November 2, 1968	2–1	Detroit Red Wings (1968–69)	7–1–1
10	L	November 3, 1968	2–3	@ Philadelphia Flyers (1968–69)	7–2–1
11	W	November 7, 1968	5–4	Pittsburgh Penguins (1968–69)	8–2–1
12	W	November 9, 1968	4–1	St. Louis Blues (1968–69)	9–2–1
13	T	November 10, 1968	4–4	@ Detroit Red Wings (1968–69)	9–2–2
14	L	November 14, 1968	3–5	Toronto Maple Leafs (1968–69)	9–3–2
15	T	November 16, 1968	3–3	Oakland Seals (1968–69)	9–3–3
16	L	November 17, 1968	2–3	@ New York Rangers (1968–69)	9–4–3
17	W	November 20, 1968	3–2	Detroit Red Wings (1968–69)	10–4–3
18	W	November 21, 1968	3–0	@ Philadelphia Flyers (1968–69)	11–4–3
19	W	November 23, 1968	4–3	Minnesota North Stars (1968–69)	12–4–3
20	W	November 27, 1968	4–2	@ Los Angeles Kings (1968–69)	13–4–3
21	L	November 29, 1968	4–5	@ Oakland Seals (1968–69)	13–5–3

December

Game	Result	Date	Score	Opponent	Record
22	W	December 1, 1968	3–1	@ Chicago Black Hawks (1968–69)	14–5–3
23	L	December 4, 1968	2–4	New York Rangers (1968–69)	14–6–3
24	T	December 5, 1968	2–2	@ Boston Bruins (1968–69)	14–6–4
25	W	December 7, 1968	6–3	Chicago Black Hawks (1968–69)	15–6–4
26	T	December 11, 1968	4–4	@ Toronto Maple Leafs (1968–69)	15–6–5
27	W	December 12, 1968	5–4	St. Louis Blues (1968–69)	16–6–5
28	W	December 14, 1968	1–0	Philadelphia Flyers (1968–69)	17–6–5
29	T	December 18, 1968	2–2	Los Angeles Kings (1968–69)	17–6–6
30	T	December 21, 1968	0–0	Boston Bruins (1968–69)	17–6–7
31	L	December 22, 1968	5–7	@ Boston Bruins (1968–69)	17–7–7
32	W	December 26, 1968	4–2	Toronto Maple Leafs (1968–69)	18–7–7
33	W	December 28, 1968	5–3	New York Rangers (1968–69)	19–7–7
34	L	December 29, 1968	1–3	@ New York Rangers (1968–69)	19–8–7
35	W	December 31, 1968	4–3	@ Pittsburgh Penguins (1968–69)	20–8–7

January

Game	Result	Date	Score	Opponent	Record
36	L	January 2, 1969	2–5	Pittsburgh Penguins (1968–69)	20–9–7
37	L	January 4, 1969	3–6	Chicago Black Hawks (1968–69)	20–10–7
38	W	January 5, 1969	4–2	@ Chicago Black Hawks (1968–69)	21–10–7
39	W	January 7, 1969	6–3	@ Minnesota North Stars (1968–69)	22–10–7
40	W	January 9, 1969	8–4	Oakland Seals (1968–69)	23–10–7
41	L	January 11, 1969	3–6	Boston Bruins (1968–69)	23–11–7
42	L	January 15, 1969	0–4	Detroit Red Wings (1968–69)	23–12–7
43	W	January 16, 1969	4–0	@ Philadelphia Flyers (1968–69)	24–12–7
44	W	January 18, 1969	3–1	Chicago Black Hawks (1968–69)	25–12–7
45	L	January 23, 1969	3–5	Oakland Seals (1968–69)	25–13–7
46	W	January 25, 1969	6–3	Philadelphia Flyers (1968–69)	26–13–7
47	L	January 26, 1969	2–3	@ New York Rangers (1968–69)	26–14–7
48	W	January 29, 1969	4–0	Minnesota North Stars (1968–69)	27–14–7

February

Game	Result	Date	Score	Opponent	Record
49	W	February 1, 1969	6–2	New York Rangers (1968–69)	28–14–7
50	W	February 2, 1969	6–4	@ Chicago Black Hawks (1968–69)	29–14–7
51	L	February 5, 1969	1–5	@ Oakland Seals (1968–69)	29–15–7
52	W	February 6, 1969	4–2	@ Los Angeles Kings (1968–69)	30–15–7
53	W	February 8, 1969	6–3	@ Minnesota North Stars (1968–69)	31–15–7
54	T	February 9, 1969	4–4	@ St. Louis Blues (1968–69)	31–15–8
55	W	February 11, 1969	7–3	Los Angeles Kings (1968–69)	32–15–8
56	W	February 13, 1969	3–1	@ Detroit Red Wings (1968–69)	33–15–8
57	W	February 15, 1969	3–1	Boston Bruins (1968–69)	34–15–8
58	W	February 16, 1969	4–0	@ Pittsburgh Penguins (1968–69)	35–15–8
59	L	February 19, 1969	1–5	@ Toronto Maple Leafs (1968–69)	35–16–8
60	W	February 20, 1969	2–1	Toronto Maple Leafs (1968–69)	36–16–8
61	W	February 22, 1969	4–1	Philadelphia Flyers (1968–69)	37–16–8
62	W	February 26, 1969	7–2	Detroit Red Wings (1968–69)	38–16–8

March

Game	Result	Date	Score	Opponent	Record
63	W	March 1, 1969	3–0	St. Louis Blues (1968–69)	39–16–8
64	L	March 2, 1969	2–4	@ Detroit Red Wings (1968–69)	39–17–8
65	W	March 6, 1969	5–3	Toronto Maple Leafs (1968–69)	40–17–8
66	T	March 8, 1969	3–3	Los Angeles Kings (1968–69)	40–17–9
67	T	March 9, 1969	2–2	@ New York Rangers (1968–69)	40–17–10
68	W	March 11, 1969	3–0	@ St. Louis Blues (1968–69)	41–17–10
69	T	March 13, 1969	4–4	Minnesota North Stars (1968–69)	41–17–11
70	W	March 15, 1969	3–1	Chicago Black Hawks (1968–69)	42–17–11
71	W	March 19, 1969	5–2	@ Chicago Black Hawks (1968–69)	43–17–11
72	W	March 20, 1969	5–3	Pittsburgh Penguins (1968–69)	44–17–11
73	W	March 22, 1969	3–1	New York Rangers (1968–69)	45–17–11
74	L	March 26, 1969	4–6	@ Toronto Maple Leafs (1968–69)	45–18–11
75	W	March 29, 1969	5–3	Boston Bruins (1968–69)	46–18–11
76	L	March 30, 1969	3–6	@ Boston Bruins (1968–69)	46–19–11

Legend: Win (2 points) Loss (0 points) Tie (1 point)

== Playoffs ==
1969 Stanley Cup playoffs
Quarterfinals vs. (E3) New York Rangers – Canadiens win 4–0

Game	Result	Date	Score	Opponent	Series
1	W	April 2, 1969	3–1	New York Rangers	1–0
2	W	April 3, 1969	5–2	New York Rangers	2–0
3	W	April 5, 1969	4–1	@ New York Rangers	3–0
4	W	April 6, 1969	4–3	@ New York Rangers	4–0

Semifinals vs. (E2) Boston Bruins – Canadiens win 4–2

Game	Result	Date	Score	Opponent	Series
1	W	April 10, 1969	3–2 (OT)	Boston Bruins	1–0
2	W	April 13, 1969	4–3 (OT)	Boston Bruins	2–0
3	L	April 17, 1969	0–5	@ Boston Bruins	2–1
4	L	April 20, 1969	2–3	@ Boston Bruins	2–2
5	W	April 22, 1969	4–2	Boston Bruins	3–2
6	W	April 24, 1969	2–1 (OT)	@ Boston Bruins	4–2

Stanley Cup Finals vs. (W1) St. Louis Blues – Canadiens win 4–0

Game	Result	Date	Score	Opponent	Series
1	W	April 27, 1969	3–1	St. Louis Blues	1–0
2	W	April 29, 1969	3–1	St. Louis Blues	2–0
3	W	May 1, 1969	4–0	@ St. Louis Blues	3–0
4	W	May 4, 1969	2–1	@ St. Louis Blues	4–0

Legend: Win Loss

== Player statistics ==
=== Regular season ===
==== Scoring ====
Player	Pos	GP	G	A	Pts	PIM	PPG	SHG	GWG
Yvan Cournoyer	RW	76	43	44	87	31	14	0	8
Jean Beliveau	C	69	33	49	82	55	7	0	5
Bobby Rousseau	RW	76	30	40	70	59	3	0	8
Jacques Lemaire	C	75	29	34	63	29	5	0	4
John Ferguson	LW	71	29	23	52	185	2	0	7
Henri Richard	C	64	15	37	52	45	2	0	0
Ralph Backstrom	C	72	13	28	41	16	2	0	3
Dick Duff	LW	68	19	21	40	24	5	0	2
J.C. Tremblay	D	75	7	32	39	18	2	0	1
Serge Savard	D	74	8	23	31	73	0	0	2
Jacques Laperriere	D	69	5	26	31	45	0	0	1
Claude Provost	RW	73	13	15	28	18	0	1	5
Gilles Tremblay	LW	44	10	15	25	2	0	0	0
Ted Harris	D	76	7	18	25	102	0	1	0
Mickey Redmond	RW	65	9	15	24	12	1	0	0
Larry Hillman	D	25	0	5	5	17	0	0	0
Christian Bordeleau	C	13	1	3	4	4	0	0	0
Terry Harper	D	21	0	3	3	37	0	0	0
Jude Drouin	C	9	0	1	1	0	0	0	0
Bob Berry	LW	2	0	0	0	0	0	0	0
Alain Caron	RW	2	0	0	0	0	0	0	0
Tony Esposito	G	13	0	0	0	0	0	0	0
Howie Glover	RW	1	0	0	0	0	0	0	0
Guy Lapointe	D	1	0	0	0	2	0	0	0
Garry Monahan	LW	3	0	0	0	0	0	0	0
Rogie Vachon	G	36	0	0	0	2	0	0	0
Ernie Wakely	G	1	0	0	0	0	0	0	0
Gump Worsley	G	30	0	0	0	0	0	0	0

==== Goaltending ====
Player	MIN	GP	W	L	T	GA	GAA	SO
Rogie Vachon	2051	36	22	9	3	98	2.87	2
Gump Worsley	1703	30	19	5	4	64	2.25	5
Tony Esposito	746	13	5	4	4	34	2.73	2
Ernie Wakely	60	1	0	1	0	4	4.00	0
Team:	4560	76	46	19	11	200	2.63	9

=== Playoffs ===
==== Scoring ====
Player	Pos	GP	G	A	Pts	PIM	PPG	SHG	GWG
Jean Beliveau	C	14	5	10	15	8	1	0	1
Dick Duff	LW	14	6	8	14	11	3	0	1
Yvan Cournoyer	RW	14	4	7	11	5	2	0	2
Serge Savard	D	14	4	6	10	24	1	0	1
John Ferguson	LW	14	4	3	7	80	2	0	2
Ralph Backstrom	C	14	3	4	7	10	1	0	1
Jacques Lemaire	C	14	4	2	6	6	1	0	0
Henri Richard	C	14	2	4	6	8	0	0	0
Bobby Rousseau	RW	14	3	2	5	8	0	1	2
Mickey Redmond	RW	14	2	3	5	2	1	0	1
J.C. Tremblay	D	13	1	4	5	6	0	0	1
Claude Provost	RW	10	2	2	4	2	0	0	0
Jacques Laperriere	D	14	1	3	4	28	1	0	0
Ted Harris	D	14	1	2	3	34	0	0	0
Christian Bordeleau	C	6	1	0	1	0	1	0	0
Lucien Grenier	RW	2	0	0	0	0	0	0	0
Terry Harper	D	11	0	0	0	8	0	0	0
Larry Hillman	D	1	0	0	0	0	0	0	0
Rogie Vachon	G	8	0	0	0	2	0	0	0
Gump Worsley	G	7	0	0	0	5	0	0	0

==== Goaltending ====
Player	MIN	GP	W	L	GA	GAA	SO
Rogie Vachon	507	8	7	1	12	1.42	1
Gump Worsley	370	7	5	1	14	2.27	0
Team:	877	14	12	2	26	1.78	1

Note:

Pos = Position;GP = Games played; G = Goals; A = Assists; Pts = Points; PIM = Penalty minutes; +/- = Plus/minus; PPG = Power-play goals; SHG = Short-handed goals; GWG = Game-winning goals
Pos = Position;GP = Games played; Min, TOI = Minutes played; W = Wins; L = Losses; T,T/OT = Ties; OTL = Overtime losses; GA = Goals-against; GAA = Goals-against average; SO = Shutouts; SA = Shots against; SV = Shots saved;SV% = Save percentage;

== Awards and records ==
- Prince of Wales Trophy
- Conn Smythe Trophy: || Serge Savard, Montreal Canadiens
- Jean Beliveau, Runner-Up, Hart Trophy
- Jean Beliveau, Centre, NHL Second All-Star Team
- Yvan Cournoyer, Right Wing, NHL Second All-Star Team
- Ted Harris, NHL Second All-Star Team

== Transactions ==
=== Trades ===
May 21, 1968	To Oakland Seals Norm Ferguson; Stan Fuller; Francois Lacombe; Michel Jacques	To Montreal Canadiens Wally Boyer; Alain Caron rights to Lyle Bradley
June 6, 1968	To Oakland Seals Bryan Watson cash	To Montreal Canadiens 1st round pick in 1972 (Michel Larocque)
June 10, 1968	To Pittsburgh Penguins Wally Boyer	To Montreal Canadiens Al MacNeil
August, 1968	To Oakland Seals Len Ronson	To Montreal Canadiens cash

== Draft picks ==
Montreal's draft picks at the 1968 NHL amateur draft held at the Queen Elizabeth Hotel in Montreal.

Round	#	Player	Nationality	College/Junior/Club team (League)
1	1	Michel Plasse	Canada	Drummondville Rangers (QJHL)
1	2	Roger Belisle	Canada	Montreal North Beavers (LHIQ)
1	3	Jim Pritchard	Canada	Winnipeg Jets (WCHL)
3	23	Don Grierson	Canada	North Bay Trappers (NOJHL)

== See also ==
- 1968–69 NHL season
- List of Stanley Cup champions
