= Bob Dillabough =

Canadian ice hockey player

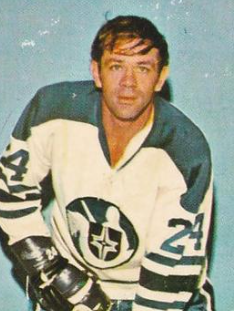
- Dillabough in 1972–73
- Born: April 24, 1941 Belleville, Ontario, Canada
- Died: March 27, 1997 (aged 55) Hamilton, Ontario, Canada
- Height: 5 ft 11 in (180 cm)
- Weight: 165 lb (75 kg; 11 st 11 lb)
- Position: Centre
- Shot: Left
- Played for: Detroit Red Wings; California Golden Seals; Pittsburgh Penguins; Cleveland Crusaders; Boston Bruins
- Playing career: 1957–1974

Robert Wellington Dillabough (April 24, 1941 – March 27, 1997) was a Canadian professional ice hockey centre who played 283 games in the National Hockey League and 72 games in the World Hockey Association. Born in Belleville, Ontario he played for the Detroit Red Wings, California Golden Seals, Pittsburgh Penguins, Cleveland Crusaders, and Boston Bruins.

== Career statistics ==
| | | | Regular Season | | | | | Playoffs |
| Season | Team | League | GP | G | A | Pts | PIM | GP | G | A | Pts | PIM |
|---|---|---|---|---|---|---|---|---|---|---|---|---|
| 1957–58 | Hamilton Tiger Cubs | OHA | 2 | 0 | 1 | 1 | 0 | — | — | — | — | — |
| 1958–59 | Hamilton Tiger Cubs | OHA | 54 | 11 | 20 | 31 | 0 | — | — | — | — | — |
| 1959–60 | Hamilton Tiger Cubs | OHA | 48 | 14 | 20 | 34 | 0 | — | — | — | — | — |
| 1960–61 | Hamilton Red Wings | OHA | 48 | 27 | 20 | 47 | 0 | — | — | — | — | — |
| 1961–62 | Hershey Bears | AHL | 5 | 2 | 1 | 3 | 2 | — | — | — | — | — |
| 1961–62 | Detroit Red Wings | NHL | 5 | 0 | 0 | 0 | 2 | — | — | — | — | — |
| 1961–62 | Sudbury Wolves | EPHL | 34 | 17 | 16 | 33 | 12 | 5 | 0 | 1 | 1 | 14 |
| 1962–63 | Edmonton Flyers | WHL | 10 | 2 | 0 | 2 | 4 | — | — | — | — | — |
| 1962–63 | Pittsburgh Hornets | AHL | 52 | 15 | 19 | 34 | 32 | — | — | — | — | — |
| 1962–63 | Detroit Red Wings | NHL | — | — | — | — | — | 1 | 0 | 0 | 0 | 0 |
| 1963–64 | Pittsburgh Hornets | AHL | 72 | 9 | 19 | 28 | 18 | 5 | 2 | 2 | 4 | 6 |
| 1963–64 | Detroit Red Wings | NHL | — | — | — | — | — | 1 | 0 | 0 | 0 | 0 |
| 1964–65 | Detroit Red Wings | NHL | 4 | 0 | 0 | 0 | 2 | 4 | 0 | 0 | 0 | 0 |
| 1964–65 | Pittsburgh Hornets | AHL | 52 | 13 | 25 | 38 | 18 | 4 | 0 | 3 | 3 | 2 |
| 1965–66 | Boston Bruins | NHL | 53 | 7 | 13 | 20 | 18 | — | — | — | — | — |
| 1966–67 | Boston Bruins | NHL | 60 | 6 | 12 | 18 | 14 | — | — | — | — | — |
| 1967–68 | Baltimore Clippers | AHL | 6 | 1 | 0 | 1 | 2 | — | — | — | — | — |
| 1967–68 | Pittsburgh Penguins | NHL | 47 | 7 | 12 | 19 | 18 | — | — | — | — | — |
| 1968–69 | Pittsburgh Penguins | NHL | 14 | 0 | 0 | 0 | 2 | — | — | — | — | — |
| 1968–69 | Oakland Seals | NHL | 48 | 7 | 12 | 19 | 4 | 7 | 3 | 0 | 3 | 0 |
| 1969–70 | Oakland Seals | NHL | 52 | 5 | 5 | 10 | 16 | 4 | 0 | 0 | 0 | 0 |
| 1970–71 | Rochester Americans | AHL | 1 | 0 | 0 | 0 | 2 | — | — | — | — | — |
| 1970–71 | Phoenix Roadrunners | WHL | 45 | 3 | 12 | 15 | 14 | 7 | 1 | 1 | 2 | 0 |
| 1971–72 | Tidewater Wings | AHL | 15 | 0 | 0 | 0 | 4 | — | — | — | — | — |
| 1972–73 | Cleveland Crusaders | WHA | 72 | 8 | 8 | 16 | 8 | 9 | 1 | 0 | 1 | 0 |
| 1973–74 | Toledo Hornets | IHL | 51 | 14 | 23 | 37 | 40 | 2 | 0 | 0 | 0 | 0 |
| NHL totals | | | 283 | 32 | 54 | 86 | 76 | 17 | 3 | 0 | 3 | 0 |
| WHA totals | | | 72 | 8 | 8 | 16 | 8 | 9 | 1 | 0 | 1 | 0 |
