= 1968–69 NHL season =

National Hockey League season

- League: National Hockey League
- Sport: Ice hockey
- Duration: October 11, 1968 – May 4, 1969
- Games: 76
- Teams: 12
- TV partner(s): CBC, SRC (Canada); CBS (United States)

Draft
- Top draft pick: Michel Plasse
- Picked by: Montreal Canadiens

Regular season
- Season champions: Montreal Canadiens
- Season MVP: Phil Esposito (Bruins)
- Top scorer: Phil Esposito (Bruins)

Playoffs
- Playoffs MVP: Serge Savard (Canadiens)

Stanley Cup
- Champions: Montreal Canadiens
- Runners-up: St. Louis Blues

NHL seasons
- 1967–68 1969–70

The 1968–69 NHL season was the 52nd season of the National Hockey League. Twelve teams each played 76 games (two more than in 1967–68). For the second time in a row, the Montreal Canadiens faced the St. Louis Blues in the Stanley Cup Final. Montreal won their second consecutive Stanley Cup as they swept the Blues in four, an identical result to the previous season.

== Amateur draft ==
The 1968 NHL amateur draft was held on June 13 at the Queen Elizabeth Hotel in Montreal, Quebec. Michel Plasse was selected first overall by the Montreal Canadiens.

== Regular season ==
Prior to this season no player in NHL history had ever achieved 100 points in a season, but 1968–69 saw three achieve the feat. The Boston Bruins' Phil Esposito led the way with 49 goals and 77 assists for a new record of 126 points, as well as setting a record with linemates Wayne Cashman and Ron Murphy for most points in a season by a forward line. Bobby Hull of Chicago set a new record for goals with 58 and came in second in overall scoring with 107. Gordie Howe of the Detroit Red Wings came in third with 103 points.

Red Berenson came up one goal short of tying an NHL record, scoring six goals for the St. Louis Blues (all against goaltender Doug Favell) in an 8–0 victory over the Philadelphia Flyers on November 7. He became the first player to score a double hat trick in a road game.

Despite finishing last in the West Division, Minnesota was led by rookie left wing Danny Grant, who along with Oakland rookie Norm Ferguson tied Nels Stewart's forty-year-old record for most goals by a rookie with 34.

On December 21, with Montreal goalies Gump Worsley (nervous breakdown) and Rogie Vachon (injured) both unavailable, rookie Tony Esposito and Boston's Gerry Cheevers both achieved shutouts in a rare scoreless tie. Esposito made 41 saves, and Cheevers made 34 saves.

Los Angeles introduced rookie goaltender Gerry Desjardins, who took over the starter's job from Wayne Rutledge, who was bothered by groin injuries most of the season. Desjardins recorded 4 shutouts during the season in helping the Kings make the playoffs and win their first round series over Oakland.

On March 2, Phil Esposito became the first NHL player to score 100 points in a season in a 4–0 win over the Pittsburgh Penguins.

In Boston-Chicago game on March 20, two milestones were accomplished. Bobby Hull broke his own record for goals with his 55th goal, and Bobby Orr broke Flash Hollett's record for goals by a defenceman with his 21st goal.

This would be the last time until the 1997–98 season that the Chicago Black Hawks missed the playoffs.

The league held a beauty pageant for the first time this season, with a contestant from every franchise. Miss Minnesota North Stars Lynn Marie Stewart was named Miss NHL 1968, and was named the NHL "ambassador" for the 1968–69 season, making various appearances and helping to present the Stanley Cup. The league held just two more pageants in 1970 and 1972 before abandoning the concept.

=== Final standings ===
East Division
		GP	W	L	T	GF	GA	DIFF	Pts
1	Montreal Canadiens	76	46	19	11	271	202	+69	103
2	Boston Bruins	76	42	18	16	303	221	+82	100
3	New York Rangers	76	41	26	9	231	196	+35	91
4	Toronto Maple Leafs	76	35	26	15	234	217	+17	85
5	Detroit Red Wings	76	33	31	12	239	221	+18	78
6	Chicago Black Hawks	76	34	33	9	280	246	+34	77

West Division
		GP	W	L	T	GF	GA	DIFF	Pts
1	St. Louis Blues	76	37	25	14	204	157	+47	88
2	Oakland Seals	76	29	36	11	219	251	−32	69
3	Philadelphia Flyers	76	20	35	21	174	225	−51	61
4	Los Angeles Kings	76	24	42	10	185	260	−75	58
5	Pittsburgh Penguins	76	20	45	11	189	252	−63	51
6	Minnesota North Stars	76	18	43	15	189	270	−81	51

== Playoffs ==
=== Playoff bracket ===
The top four teams in each division qualified for the playoffs. In the quarterfinals, the third seeded team in each division played against the division winner from their division. The other series matched the second and fourth place teams from the divisions. The two winning teams from each division's first round series then met in the Stanley Cup Semifinals. The two winners of the Semifinals then advanced to the Stanley Cup Final.

In each round, teams competed in a best-of-seven series (scores in the bracket indicate the number of games won in each best-of-seven series).

Quarterfinals
1	Montreal	4
3	New York	0
East Division
2	Boston	4
4	Toronto	0
1	St. Louis	4
3	Philadelphia	0
West Division
2	Oakland	3
4	Los Angeles	4

Semifinals
1	Montreal	4
2	Boston	2
1	St. Louis	4
4	Los Angeles	0

Stanley Cup Finals
E1	Montreal	4
W1	St. Louis	0

=== Quarterfinals ===
==== (E1) Montreal Canadiens vs. (E3) New York Rangers ====
The Montreal Canadiens finished as the best regular season team with 103 points. The New York Rangers earned 91 points to finish third in the East Division. This was the ninth playoff series between these two teams, and they split their eight previous series. Their most recent series had come in the 1967 semifinals, which Montreal won in a four-game sweep. New York earned nine of sixteen points in this year's regular season series.

The Canadiens defeated the Rangers in a four-game sweep to advance to the semifinals.

April 2	New York Rangers	1–3	Montreal Canadiens	Montreal Forum	Recap
No scoring		First period	15:35 – Jacques Lemaire (1)
Jean Ratelle (1) – pp – 19:13		Second period	No scoring
No scoring		Third period	13:18 – pp – John Ferguson (1); 19:20 – en – Henri Richard (1)
Eddie Giacomin 24 saves / 26 shots		Goalie stats	Gump Worsley 26 saves / 27 shots

April 3	New York Rangers	2–5	Montreal Canadiens	Montreal Forum	Recap
Rod Seiling (1) – 01:51; Vic Hadfield (1) – 14:43		First period	11:55 – pp – Christian Bordeleau (1)
No scoring		Second period	04:28 – Bobby Rousseau (1); 06:45 – pp – Yvan Cournoyer (1); 12:59 – Jean Beliveau (1)
No scoring		Third period	19:32 – pp – en – Ralph Backstrom (1)
Eddie Giacomin 20 saves / 24 shots		Goalie stats	Gump Worsley 26 saves / 28 shots

April 5	Montreal Canadiens	4–1	New York Rangers	Madison Square Garden	Recap
Mickey Redmond (1) – 00:30; Bobby Rousseau (2) – 03:37; Dick Duff (1) – 12:41		First period	No scoring
No scoring		Second period	No scoring
Jean Beliveau (2) – pp – 08:33		Third period	09:12 – Vic Hadfield (2)
Gump Worsley 31 saves / 32 shots		Goalie stats	Eddie Giacomin 14 saves / 18 shots

April 6	Montreal Canadiens	4–3	New York Rangers	Madison Square Garden	Recap
Dick Duff (2) – 01:32; Jacques Lemaire (2) – 10:03; Henri Richard (2) – 10:42		First period	No scoring
Yvan Cournoyer (2) – 00:38		Second period	12:10 – Dave Balon (1); 15:08 – Rod Gilbert (1)
No scoring		Third period	07:23 – Don Marshall (1)
Gump Worsley 2 saves / 2 shots Rogie Vachon 22 saves / 25 shots		Goalie stats	Gilles Villemure 30 saves / 34 shots

Montreal won series 4–0

==== (E2) Boston Bruins v. (E4) Toronto Maple Leafs ====
The Boston Bruins finished second in the East Division with 100 points. The Toronto Maple Leafs earned 85 points to finish fourth in the East Division. This was the eleventh playoff series between these two teams, with Toronto winning eight of their ten previous series. Their most recent series had come in the 1959 semifinals, where Toronto won in seven games. Boston earned ten of sixteen points in this year's regular season series.

Boston defeated Toronto in a four-game sweep to advance to the semifinals.

April 2	Toronto Maple Leafs	0–10	Boston Bruins	Boston Garden	Recap
No scoring		First period	01:19 – pp – Phil Esposito (1); 03:20 – pp – Johnny Bucyk (1); 14:01 – Phil Esposito (2)
No scoring		Second period	07:22 – Johnny Bucyk (2); 10:40 – Derek Sanderson (1); 14:10 – pp – Phil Esposito (3); 19:51 – pp – Phil Esposito (4)
No scoring		Third period	01:23 – pp – Fred Stanfield (1); 04:34 – Derek Sanderson (2); 12:47 – pp – Ken Hodge (1)
Bruce Gamble 26 saves / 33 shots Johnny Bower 15 saves / 18 shots		Goalie stats	Gerry Cheevers 40 saves / 40 shots

April 3	Toronto Maple Leafs	0–7	Boston Bruins	Boston Garden	Recap
No scoring		First period	15:12 – pp – Johnny Bucyk (3); 17:33 – Johnny Bucyk (4); 18:55 – Ted Green (1)
No scoring		Second period	05:56 – John McKenzie (1); 18:44 – Ken Hodge (2)
No scoring		Third period	08:39 – Ron Murphy (1); 10:07 – Phil Esposito (5)
Bruce Gamble 16 saves / 20 shtos Johnny Bower 17 saves / 20 shtos		Goalie stats	Gerry Cheevers 22 saves / 22 shots

April 5	Boston Bruins	4–3	Toronto Maple Leafs	Maple Leaf Gardens	Recap
Ed Westfall (1) – sh – 04:18; Ted Green (2) – 14:38		First period	08:23 – Ron Ellis (1)
Fred Stanfield (2) – 04:04		Second period	15:32 – Murray Oliver (1); 19:47 – Norm Ullman (1)
Derek Sanderson (3) – 02:52		Third period	No scoring
Gerry Cheevers 38 saves / 41 shots		Goalie stats	Bruce Gamble 11 saves / 13 shots Johnny Bower 28 saves / 30 shots

April 6	Boston Bruins	3–2	Toronto Maple Leafs	Maple Leaf Gardens	Recap
Derek Sanderson (4) – sh – 01:21; Phil Esposito (6) – pp – 03:14		First period	07:52 – pp – Ron Ellis (2)
Derek Sanderson (5) – 16:07		Second period	17:52 – sh – Dave Keon (1)
No scoring		Third period	No scoring
Gerry Cheevers 26 saves / 28 shots		Goalie stats	Johnny Bower 27 saves / 30 shots

Boston won series 4–0

==== (W1) St. Louis Blues vs. (W3) Philadelphia Flyers ====
The St. Louis Blues finished as West Division champions with 88 points. The Philadelphia Flyers earned 61 points to finish third in the West Division. This was the second playoff series between these two teams, in the second year of existence for both franchises. In the previous year's Stanley Cup Quarterfinals, St. Louis defeated Philadelphia in seven games. St. Louis earned thirteen of sixteen points in this year's regular season series.

St. Louis defeated Philadelphia to advance to the semifinals with the franchise's first four-game sweep.

April 2	Philadelphia Flyers	2–5	St. Louis Blues	St. Louis Arena	Recap
Bill Sutherland (1) – pp – 12:13		First period	00:50 – Ab McDonald (1); 05:43 – Tim Ecclestone (1); 15:10 – Larry Keenan (1)
No scoring		Second period	No scoring
Dick Cherry (1) – 18:26		Third period	03:22 – Camille Henry (1); 17:39 – Terry Gray (1)
Bernie Parent 25 saves / 30 shots		Goalie stats	Glenn Hall 8 saves / 8 shots Jacques Plante 27 saves / 29 shots

April 3	Philadelphia Flyers	0–5	St. Louis Blues	St. Louis Arena	Recap
No scoring		First period	00:41 – pp – Bill McCreary Sr. (1); 15:58 – Gary Sabourin (1)
No scoring		Second period	00:45 – Larry Keenan (2); 12:03 – pp – Red Berenson (1); 16:49 – pp – Terry Gray (2)
No scoring		Third period	No scoring
Doug Favell 31 saves / 36 shots		Goalie stats	Jacques Plante 21 saves / 21 shots

April 5	St. Louis Blues	3–0	Philadelphia Flyers	Spectrum	Recap
Gary Sabourin (2) – 07:13		First period	No scoring
Ron Schock (1) – 13:24		Second period	No scoring
Red Berenson (2) – 12:12		Third period	No scoring
Jacques Plante 27 saves / 27 shots		Goalie stats	Bernie Parent 23 saves / 26 shots

April 6	St. Louis Blues	4–1	Philadelphia Flyers	Spectrum	Recap
Frank St. Marseille (1) – 00:52; Terry Crisp (1) – 04:08; Jimmy Roberts (1) – 04:22		First period	No scoring
Tim Ecclestone (2) – 01:17		Second period	04:54 – sh – Garry Peters (1)
No scoring		Third period	No scoring
Jacques Plante 30 saves / 31 shots		Goalie stats	Bernie Parent 34 saves / 38 shots

St. Louis won series 4–0

==== (W2) Oakland Seals vs. (W4) Los Angeles Kings ====
The Oakland Seals finished second in the West Division with 69 points to advance to the playoffs for the first time. The Los Angeles Kings earned 58 points to finish fourth in the West Division. This was the first playoff series of the Battle of California and the first playoff meeting between two California-based NHL teams. Los Angeles earned ten of sixteen points in this year's regular season series.

The Kings defeated the Seals in the only game seven of the year. Oakland never won another playoff game in franchise history.

April 2	Los Angeles Kings	5–4	OT	Oakland Seals	Oakland–Alameda County Coliseum Arena	Recap
Gary Croteau (1) – pp – 12:53		First period		11:59 – sh – Earl Ingarfield (1); 16:21 – Joe Szura (1)
Gary Croteau (2) – 03:07		Second period		19:16 – Francois Lacombe (1)
Eddie Joyal (1) – 12:15; Eddie Joyal (2) – 15:56		Third period		17:22 – Gene Ubriaco (1)
Ted Irvine (1) – 00:19		First overtime period		No scoring
Gerry Desjardins 6 saves / 8 shots Wayne Rutledge 20 saves / 22 shots		Goalie stats		Gary Smith 26 saves / 31 shots

April 3	Los Angeles Kings	2–4	Oakland Seals	Oakland–Alameda County Coliseum Arena	Recap
No scoring		First period	01:26 – pp – Ted Hampson (1)
Ted Irvine (1) – 00:20; Howie Menard (1) – pp – 07:07		Second period	18:23 – Ted Hampson (2)
No scoring		Third period	02:44 – Gary Jarrett (1); 19:47 – en – Bob Dillabough (1)
Wayne Rutledge 30 saves / 33 shots		Goalie stats	Gary Smith 26 saves / 28 shots

April 5	Oakland Seals	5–2	Los Angeles Kings	LA Forum	Recap
No scoring		First period	No scoring
Joe Szura (2) – pp – 11:30; Gary Jarrett (2) – 14:48		Second period	10:21 – pp – Real Lemieux (1)
Earl Ingarfield (2) – 00:13; Mike Laughton (1) – pp – 09:09; 16:05 – Gerry Ehman (1)		Third period	14:46 – Billy Inglis (1)
Gary Smith 31 saves / 33 shots		Goalie stats	Wayne Rutledge 22 saves / 26 shots Gerry Desjardins 5 saves / 6 shots

April 6	Oakland Seals	2–4	Los Angeles Kings	LA Forum	Recap
Earl Ingarfield (3) – 01:27		First period	10:33 – Bill White (1); 17:31 – Howie Menard (2)
No scoring		Second period	00:24 – Larry Cahan (1); 14:06 – Brent Hughes (1)
Ted Hampson (3) – pp – 06:59		Third period	No scoring
Gary Smith 29 saves / 33 shots		Goalie stats	Gerry Desjardins 27 saves / 29 shots

April 9	Los Angeles Kings	1–4	Oakland Seals	Oakland–Alameda County Coliseum Arena	Recap
Gary Croteau (3) – 15:51		First period	01:06 – Mike Laughton (2)
No scoring		Second period	05:42 – Bob Dillabough (2)
No scoring		Third period	03:44 – Bob Dillabough (3); 16:43 – Norm Ferguson (1)
Gerry Desjardins 33 saves / 37 shots		Goalie stats	Gary Smith 36 saves / 37 shots

April 10	Oakland Seals	3–4	Los Angeles Kings	LA Forum	Recap
Mike Laughton (3) – 04:53; Brian Perry (1) – 16:42; Gene Ubriaco (2) – 17:51		First period	03:53 – Ted Irvine (3); 06:19 – Bryan Campbell (1); 16:05 – sh – Lowell MacDonald (1)
No scoring		Second period	15:12 – Bill Flett (1)
No scoring		Third period	No scoring
Gary Smith 32 saves / 36 shots		Goalie stats	Gerry Desjardins 22 saves / 25 shots

April 13	Los Angeles Kings	5–3	Oakland Seals	Oakland–Alameda County Coliseum Arena	Recap
Ted Irvine (4) – pp – 02:13; Ted Irvine (5) – 12:14		First period	04:09 – pp – Carol Vadnais (1)
Bill Flett (2) – 14:54		Second period	09:51 – Earl Ingarfield (4)
Lowell MacDonald (2) – 07:53; Howie Menard (3) – 18:26		Third period	10:36 – Gerry Ehman (2)
Gerry Desjardins 24 saves / 27 shots		Goalie stats	Gary Smith 25 saves / 30 shots

Los Angeles won series 4–3

=== Semifinals ===
==== (E1) Montreal Canadiens vs. (E2) Boston Bruins ====
This was the fourteenth playoff series between these two rivals, with Montreal winning eleven of their thirteen previous series. Their most recent series had come in the previous year's quarterfinals, where Montreal won in a four-game sweep. Boston earned ten of sixteen points in this year's regular season series.

The Canadiens defeated the Bruins in six games to advance to their fifth consecutive Stanley Cup Final.

April 10	Boston Bruins	2–3	OT	Montreal Canadiens	Montreal Forum	Recap
Derek Sanderson (6) – 13:28		First period		No scoring
Derek Sanderson (7) – sh – 15:53		Second period		No scoring
No scoring		Third period		13:28 – pp – John Ferguson (2); 19:04 – Jean Beliveau (3)
No scoring		First overtime period		00:42 – Ralph Backstrom (2)
Gerry Cheevers 32 saves / 35 shots		Goalie stats		Gump Worsley 21 saves / 23 shots

April 13	Boston Bruins	3–4	OT	Montreal Canadiens	Montreal Forum	Recap
No scoring		First period		No scoring
John McKenzie (2) – pp – 08:39; Ron Murphy (2) – 18:01		Second period		00:55 – pp – Yvan Cournoyer (3); 17:09 – Jean Beliveau (4)
Johnny Bucyk (5) – 14:12		Third period		18:51 – Serge Savard (1)
No scoring		First overtime period		04:55 – pp – Mickey Redmond (2)
Eddie Johnston 30 saves / 34 shots		Goalie stats		Gump Worsley 27 saves / 30 shots

April 17	Montreal Canadiens	0–5	Boston Bruins	Boston Garden	Recap
No scoring		First period	03:37 – Phil Esposito (7)
No scoring		Second period	16:35 – Ed Westfall (2)
No scoring		Third period	03:37 – pp – Phil Esposito (8); 10:07 – Ron Murphy (3); 10:23 – Ken Hodge (3)
Gump Worsley 26 saves / 31 shots		Goalie stats	Gerry Cheevers 34 saves / 34 shots

April 20	Montreal Canadiens	2–3	Boston Bruins	Boston Garden	Recap
Jacques Lemaire (3) – pp – 08:51		First period	02:55 – sh – Ed Westfall (3); 15:49 – sh – Derek Sanderson (8)
No scoring		Second period	No scoring
Serge Savard (2) – 19:06		Third period	18:13 – Bobby Orr (1)
Rogie Vachon 29 saves / 32 shots		Goalie stats	Gerry Cheevers 28 saves / 30 shots

April 22	Boston Bruins	2–4	Montreal Canadiens	Montreal Forum	Recap
No scoring		First period	18:25 – pp – Jacques Laperriere (1)
Ken Hodge (4) – 10:15; Ken Hodge (5) – pp – 13:21		Second period	01:08 – Claude Provost (1); 02:01 – J.C. Tremblay (1)
No scoring		Third period	07:06 – Claude Provost (2)
Gerry Cheevers 21 saves / 25 shots		Goalie stats	Rogie Vachon 40 saves / 42 shots

April 24	Montreal Canadiens	2–1	2OT	Boston Bruins	Boston Garden	Recap
No scoring		First period		02:29 – Ron Murphy (4)
No scoring		Second period		No scoring
Serge Savard (3) – pp – 01:10		Third period		No scoring
Jean Beliveau (5) – 11:28		Second overtime period		No scoring
Rogie Vachon 50 saves / 51 shots		Goalie stats		Gerry Cheevers 45 saves / 47 shots

Montreal won series 4–2

==== (W1) St. Louis Blues vs. (W4) Los Angeles Kings ====
This was the first playoff series between these two teams. St. Louis earned thirteen of sixteen points in this year's regular season series.

The Blues defeated the Kings in a four-game sweep to continue their undefeated streak in the playoffs, and their streak of never missing a Stanley Cup Final.

April 15	Los Angeles Kings	0–4	St. Louis Blues	St. Louis Arena	Recap
No scoring		First period	11:00 – Larry Keenan (3)
No scoring		Second period	01:56 – Red Berenson (3); 04:49 – pp – Red Berenson (4); 10:24 – Red Berenson (5)
No scoring		Third period	No scoring
Gerry Desjardins 12 saves / 16 shots Wayne Rutledge 6 saves / 6 shots		Goalie stats	Jacques Plante 30 saves / 30 shots

April 17	Los Angeles Kings	2–3	St. Louis Blues	St. Louis Arena	Recap
No scoring		First period	03:48 – Red Berenson (6)
No scoring		Second period	11:22 – Gary Sabourin (3)
Dave Amadio (1) – 02:12; Bryan Campbell (2) – sh – 08:28		Third period	14:31 – Gary Sabourin (4)
Wayne Rutledge 23 saves / 26 shots		Goalie stats	Jacques Plante 26 saves / 28 shots

April 19	St. Louis Blues	5–2	Los Angeles Kings	LA Forum	Recap
Frank St. Marseille (2) – 10:13		First period	02:18 – pp – Bill Flett (3)
Ab McDonald (2) – 04:07		Second period	No scoring
Terry Crisp (2) – 04:18; Gary Sabourin (5) – 06:40; Noel Picard (1) – 13:03		Third period	02:34 – Skip Krake (1)
Jacques Plante 26 saves / 28 shots		Goalie stats	Gerry Desjardins 26 saves / 31 shots

April 20	St. Louis Blues	4–1	Los Angeles Kings	LA Forum	Recap
Terry Crisp (3) – 11:38		First period	01:48 – pp – Eddie Joyal (3)
Red Berenson (7) – 11:52; Gary Sabourin (6) – pp – 12:44		Second period	No scoring
Camille Henry (2) – pp – 10:56		Third period	No scoring
Jacques Plante 21 saves / 22 shots		Goalie stats	Gerry Desjardins 19 saves / 23 shots

St. Louis won series 4–0

=== Stanley Cup Finals ===
The Montreal Canadiens advanced to the Stanley Cup Final for the fifth consecutive season, having won three Stanley Cups in the previous four seasons. Overall, it was their twenty-fifth Stanley Cup Finals, having won fifteen championships. This was the St. Louis Blues' second appearance in the Final in their second season. The Canadiens had never lost to the Blues going into this series; they went 3-0-1 against St. Louis in the 1967–68 NHL season, 4–0 in the previous year's Stanley Cup Final, and 5-0-1 in this year's regular season series.

The Montreal Canadiens swept the St. Louis Blues, an outcome identical to the 1968 final.

April 27	St. Louis Blues	1–3	Montreal Canadiens	Montreal Forum	Recap
Frank St. Marseille (3) – 18:24		First period	03:39 – pp – Dick Duff (3); 04:17 – sh – Bobby Rousseau (3)
No scoring		Second period	No scoring
No scoring		Third period	19:46 – en – John Ferguson (3)
Jacques Plante 26 saves / 28 shots		Goalie stats	Rogie Vachon 19 saves / 20 shots

April 29	St. Louis Blues	1–3	Montreal Canadiens	Montreal Forum	Recap
No scoring		First period	17:26 – Ralph Backstrom (3)
No scoring		Second period	09:07 – pp – Dick Duff (4); 14:11 – Yvan Cournoyer (4)
Larry Keenan (4) – pp – 09:20		Third period	No scoring
Glenn Hall 30 saves / 33 shots		Goalie stats	Rogie Vachon 24 saves / 25 shots

May 1	Montreal Canadiens	4–0	St. Louis Blues	St. Louis Arena	Recap
Serge Savard (4) – 12:34		First period	No scoring
Jacques Lemaire (4) – 09:16; Dick Duff (5) – 13:38		Second period	No scoring
Dick Duff (6) – pp – 18:35		Third period	No scoring
Rogie Vachon 29 saves / 29 shots		Goalie stats	Jacques Plante 31 saves / 35 shots

May 4	Montreal Canadiens	2–1	St. Louis Blues	St. Louis Arena	Recap
No scoring		First period	No scoring
No scoring		Second period	10:50 – Terry Gray (3)
Ted Harris (1) – 00:42; John Ferguson (4) – 03:02		Third period	No scoring
Rogie Vachon 32 saves / 33 shots		Goalie stats	Glenn Hall 29 saves / 31 shots

Montreal won series 4–0

== Awards ==
1968–69 NHL awards
Prince of Wales Trophy: (East Division champion, regular season)	Montreal Canadiens
Clarence S. Campbell Bowl: (West Division champion, regular season)	St. Louis Blues
Art Ross Trophy: (Top scorer, regular season)	Phil Esposito, Boston Bruins
Bill Masterton Memorial Trophy: (Perseverance, sportsmanship, and dedication)	Ted Hampson, Oakland Seals
Calder Memorial Trophy: (Top first-year player)	Danny Grant, Minnesota North Stars
Conn Smythe Trophy: (Most valuable player, playoffs)	Serge Savard, Montreal Canadiens
Hart Memorial Trophy: (Most valuable player, regular season)	Phil Esposito, Boston Bruins
James Norris Memorial Trophy: (Best defenceman)	Bobby Orr, Boston Bruins
Lady Byng Memorial Trophy: (Excellence and sportsmanship)	Alex Delvecchio, Detroit Red Wings
Vezina Trophy: (Goaltender(s) of team with best goaltending record)	Glenn Hall & Jacques Plante, St. Louis Blues

=== All-Star teams ===
First Team	Position	Second Team
Glenn Hall, St. Louis Blues	G	Ed Giacomin, New York Rangers
Bobby Orr, Boston Bruins	D	Ted Green, Boston Bruins
Tim Horton, Toronto Maple Leafs	D	Ted Harris, Montreal Canadiens
Phil Esposito, Boston Bruins	C	Jean Beliveau, Montreal Canadiens
Gordie Howe, Detroit Red Wings	RW	Yvan Cournoyer, Montreal Canadiens
Bobby Hull, Chicago Black Hawks	LW	Frank Mahovlich, Detroit Red Wings

== Player statistics ==
=== Scoring leaders ===
Note: GP = Games played, G = Goals, A = Assists, PTS = Points, PIM = Penalties in minutes

Player	Team	GP	G	A	PTS	PIM
Phil Esposito	Boston Bruins	74	49	77	126	79
Bobby Hull	Chicago Black Hawks	74	58	49	107	48
Gordie Howe	Detroit Red Wings	76	44	59	103	58
Stan Mikita	Chicago Black Hawks	74	30	67	97	52
Ken Hodge	Boston Bruins	75	45	45	90	75
Yvan Cournoyer	Montreal Canadiens	76	43	44	87	31
Alex Delvecchio	Detroit Red Wings	72	25	58	83	8
Red Berenson	St. Louis Blues	76	35	47	82	43
Jean Beliveau	Montreal Canadiens	69	33	49	82	55
Frank Mahovlich	Detroit Red Wings	76	49	29	78	38
Jean Ratelle	New York Rangers	75	32	46	78	26

Source: NHL.

=== Leading goaltenders ===
Note: GP = Games played; Min = Minutes played; GA = Goals against; GAA = Goals against average; W = Wins; L = Losses; T = Ties; SO = Shutouts

Player	Team	GP	MIN	GA	GAA	W	L	T	SO
Jacques Plante	St. Louis Blues	37	2139	70	1.96	18	12	6	5
Glenn Hall	St. Louis Blues	41	2354	85	2.17	19	12	8	8
Gump Worsley	Montreal Canadiens	30	1703	64	2.26	19	5	4	5
Roy Edwards	Detroit Red Wings	40	2099	89	2.54	18	11	6	4
Eddie Giacomin	New York Rangers	70	4114	175	2.55	37	23	7	7
Bernie Parent	Philadelphia Flyers	58	3365	151	2.69	17	23	16	1
Bruce Gamble	Toronto Maple Leafs	61	3446	161	2.80	28	20	11	3
Gerry Cheevers	Boston Bruins	52	3112	145	2.80	28	12	12	3
Johnny Bower	Toronto Maple Leafs	20	779	37	2.85	5	4	3	2
Rogie Vachon	Montreal Canadiens	36	2051	98	2.87	22	9	3	2

=== Other statistics ===
- Plus-Minus leader: Bobby Orr, Boston Bruins

== Coaches ==
=== East ===
- Boston Bruins: Harry Sinden
- Chicago Black Hawks: Billy Reay
- Detroit Red Wings: Bill Gadsby
- Montreal Canadiens: Claude Ruel
- New York Rangers: Bernie Geoffrion and Emile Francis
- Toronto Maple Leafs: Punch Imlach

=== West ===
- Los Angeles Kings: Red Kelly
- Minnesota North Stars: John Muckler and Wren Blair
- Oakland Seals: Fred Glover
- Philadelphia Flyers: Keith Allen
- Pittsburgh Penguins: George "Red" Sullivan
- St. Louis Blues: Scotty Bowman

== Debuts ==
The following is a list of players of note who played their first NHL game in 1968–69 (listed with their first team, asterisk(*) marks debut in playoffs):

- Bob Berry, Montreal Canadiens
- Guy Lapointe, Montreal Canadiens
- Jude Drouin, Montreal Canadiens
- Tony Esposito, Montreal Canadiens
- Brad Park, New York Rangers
- Pat Quinn, Toronto Maple Leafs
- Jean Pronovost, Pittsburgh Penguins

== Last games ==
The following is a list of players of note that played their last game in the NHL in 1968–69 (listed with their last team):

- Kenny Wharram, Chicago Black Hawks
- Kent Douglas, Detroit Red Wings
- Gilles Tremblay, Montreal Canadiens
- Allan Stanley, Philadelphia Flyers
- Billy Harris, Pittsburgh Penguins
- Doug Harvey, St. Louis Blues
- Pierre Pilote, Toronto Maple Leafs

== Broadcasting ==
Hockey Night in Canada on CBC Television televised Saturday night regular season games and Stanley Cup playoff games. HNIC also produced Wednesday night regular season game telecasts for CTV. This was the first season that games were shown in their entirety instead of typically being joined in progress.

This was the third season under the U.S. rights agreement with CBS, airing weekend afternoon regular season games and Sunday afternoon playoff games.

== See also ==
- 1968–69 NHL transactions
- List of Stanley Cup champions
- 1968 NHL amateur draft
- 22nd National Hockey League All-Star Game
- National Hockey League All-Star Game
- Lester Patrick Trophy
- 1968 in sports
- 1969 in sports
