= Skip Krake =

Canadian ice hockey player

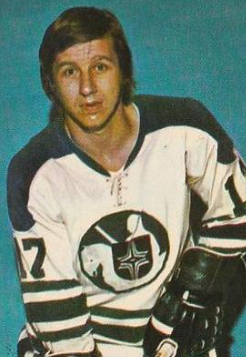
- Krake in 1972–73
- Born: October 14, 1943 (age 81); Rabbit Lake, Saskatchewan, Canada
- Height: 5 ft 10 in (178 cm)
- Weight: 165 lb (75 kg; 11 st 11 lb)
- Position: Centre
- Shot: Right
- Played for: Boston Bruins; Los Angeles Kings; Buffalo Sabres; Cleveland Crusaders (WHA); Edmonton Oilers (WHA)
- Playing career: 1964–1976

Philip Gordon "Skip" Krake (born October 14, 1943) is a Canadian former ice hockey centre. He played in the National Hockey League with the Boston Bruins, Los Angeles Kings, and Buffalo Sabres between 1964 and 1971. In addition, he played in the World Hockey Association with the Cleveland Crusaders and Edmonton Oilers between 1972 and 1976.

In his NHL career, Krake appeared in 249 games, scoring 23 goals and adding 40 assists. He played in 207 WHA games, scoring 52 goals and adding 77 assists.

Krake's first NHL goal came on February 14, 1967, in Boston's 6-3 home victory over Detroit.

== Career statistics ==
=== Regular season and playoffs ===
			Regular season					Playoffs
Season	Team	League	GP	G	A	Pts	PIM	GP	G	A	Pts	PIM
1960–61	Estevan Bruins	SJHL	11	3	1	4	4	11	0	3	3	0
1961–62	Estevan Bruins	SJHL	42	25	15	40	42	10	3	4	7	10
1962–63	Estevan Bruins	SJHL	54	26	37	63	126	11	11	10	21	35
1962–63	Estevan Bruins	M-Cup	—	—	—	—	—	6	2	1	3	2
1963–64	Estevan Bruins	SJHL	60	59	56	115	142	10	13	9	22	16
1963–64	Estevan Bruins	M-Cup	—	—	—	—	—	6	0	2	2	14
1963–64	Boston Bruins	NHL	2	0	0	0	0	—	—	—	—	—
1964–65	Minneapolis Bruins	CHL	69	22	24	46	33	5	1	2	3	11
1965–66	Boston Bruins	NHL	2	0	0	0	0	—	—	—	—	—
1965–66	Oklahoma City Blazers	CHL	70	24	37	61	97	9	4	6	10	11
1966–67	Boston Bruins	NHL	15	6	2	8	4	—	—	—	—	—
1966–67	Oklahoma City Blazers	CHL	49	15	18	33	107	—	—	—	—	—
1967–68	Boston Bruins	NHL	68	5	7	12	13	4	0	0	0	2
1968–69	Los Angeles Kings	NHL	30	3	9	12	11	6	1	0	1	15
1968–69	Springfield Kings	AHL	43	8	23	31	67	—	—	—	—	—
1969–70	Los Angeles Kings	NHL	58	5	17	22	86	—	—	—	—	—
1970–71	Buffalo Sabres	NHL	74	4	5	9	68	—	—	—	—	—
1971–72	Salt Lake Golden Eagles	WHL	53	15	36	51	59	—	—	—	—	—
1972–73	Cleveland Crusaders	WHA	26	9	10	19	61	9	1	2	3	27
1973–74	Cleveland Crusaders	WHA	69	20	36	56	94	5	0	1	1	39
1974–75	Cleveland Crusaders	WHA	71	15	23	38	108	5	1	1	2	0
1975–76	Edmonton Oilers	WHA	41	8	8	16	55	—	—	—	—	—
WHA totals			207	52	77	129	318	19	2	4	6	66
NHL totals			249	23	40	63	182	10	1	0	1	17
