= Gary Croteau =

Canadian ice hockey player

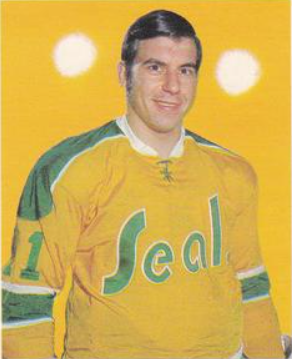
- Born: June 20, 1946 (age 79) Sudbury, Ontario, Canada
- Height: 6 ft 0 in (183 cm)
- Weight: 205 lb (93 kg; 14 st 9 lb)
- Position: Left wing
- Shot: Left
- Played for: NHL; Los Angeles Kings; Detroit Red Wings; California Golden Seals; Kansas City Scouts; Colorado Rockies
- Playing career: 1968–1981

Gary Croteau (born June 20, 1946) is a Canadian former ice hockey forward, most notably with the Colorado Rockies of the National Hockey League.

== Playing career ==
Croteau was born in Sudbury, Ontario, the son of Earl and Georgina Croteau. Earl Croteau was a miner. (Icing on the Plains: The Rough Ride of Kansas City's NHL Scouts, pp. 84-85, Troy Treasure, Balboa Press).

After a dominant collegiate hockey career playing for coach George Menard (pp.85-86) at St. Lawrence University, capped by being selected to the ECAC First All-Star Team in 1968, Croteau was signed as a free agent by the Toronto Maple Leafs in 1968, which promptly dealt him to the Los Angeles Kings. He played two sound seasons with LA's American Hockey League Springfield Kings farm team, and in limited action with Los Angeles in 1968 scored a fine five goals in eleven games. On the strength of that performance, he played with the Kings in the playoffs that year, scoring five goals in eleven games as Los Angeles went to the semifinals. Kings owner Jack Kent Cooke nicknamed Croteau "Bull." However, after only three further games for the Kings early in 1969-70, he was dealt to the Detroit Red Wings February 1970, seeing only limited action with Detroit before being claimed by the California Golden Seals in the 1970 waiver draft. With the talent-thin Golden Seals, he became a regular for four seasons, finishing among the team's leading scorers in his first and final seasons with the squad.

When the NHL expanded to Kansas City and Washington in 1974, Croteau was the seventh pick of the Scouts and a key player for the weak franchise from the beginning. Croteau scored the first goal in Kansas City's first-ever win, a 5-4 victory at Washington, in early November. After a modest 1974-75 season, Croteau was one of the team's leading scorers and few decent players for four years thereafter, even after the franchise moved to Denver and became the Colorado Rockies in 1976. His best season came in 1976-77, when he scored 24 goals and 27 assists for 51 points, all career highs.

After an injury that cost him most of the 1979-80 season, Croteau retired from hockey, save for a brief stint in the minor leagues the following year. Croteau resides in the Denver area.

== Awards and honors ==
| Award | Year |
|---|---|
| All-ECAC Hockey First Team | 1967–68 |

== Career statistics ==
| | | | Regular season | | | | | Playoffs |
| Season | Team | League | GP | G | A | Pts | PIM | GP | G | A | Pts | PIM |
|---|---|---|---|---|---|---|---|---|---|---|---|---|
| 1964–65 | St. Lawrence University | ECAC | 14 | 18 | 13 | 31 | — | — | — | — | — | — |
| 1965–66 | St. Lawrence University | ECAC | 24 | 20 | 11 | 31 | 12 | — | — | — | — | — |
| 1966–67 | St. Lawrence University | ECAC | 27 | 21 | 17 | 38 | — | — | — | — | — | — |
| 1967–68 | St. Lawrence University | ECAC | 19 | 21 | 19 | 40 | — | — | — | — | — | — |
| 1968–69 | Los Angeles Kings | NHL | 11 | 5 | 1 | 6 | 6 | 11 | 3 | 2 | 5 | 8 |
| 1968–69 | Springfield Kings | AHL | 53 | 24 | 20 | 44 | 27 | — | — | — | — | — |
| 1969–70 | Los Angeles Kings | NHL | 3 | 0 | 0 | 0 | 0 | — | — | — | — | — |
| 1969–70 | Springfield Kings | AHL | 52 | 23 | 21 | 44 | 22 | — | — | — | — | — |
| 1969–70 | Detroit Red Wings | NHL | 10 | 0 | 2 | 2 | 2 | — | — | — | — | — |
| 1970–71 | California Golden Seals | NHL | 74 | 15 | 28 | 43 | 12 | — | — | — | — | — |
| 1971–72 | California Golden Seals | NHL | 73 | 12 | 12 | 24 | 11 | — | — | — | — | — |
| 1972–73 | California Golden Seals | NHL | 47 | 6 | 15 | 21 | 8 | — | — | — | — | — |
| 1973–74 | California Golden Seals | NHL | 76 | 14 | 21 | 35 | 16 | — | — | — | — | — |
| 1974–75 | Kansas City Scouts | NHL | 77 | 8 | 11 | 19 | 16 | — | — | — | — | — |
| 1975–76 | Kansas City Scouts | NHL | 79 | 19 | 14 | 33 | 12 | — | — | — | — | — |
| 1976–77 | Colorado Rockies | NHL | 78 | 24 | 27 | 51 | 14 | — | — | — | — | — |
| 1977–78 | Colorado Rockies | NHL | 62 | 17 | 22 | 39 | 24 | — | — | — | — | — |
| 1978–79 | Colorado Rockies | NHL | 79 | 23 | 18 | 41 | 18 | — | — | — | — | — |
| 1979–80 | Colorado Rockies | NHL | 15 | 1 | 4 | 5 | 4 | — | — | — | — | — |
| 1980–81 | Fort Worth Texans | CHL | 4 | 1 | 1 | 2 | 2 | — | — | — | — | — |
| NHL totals | | | 684 | 144 | 175 | 319 | 143 | 11 | 3 | 2 | 5 | 8 |

Sporting positions
| Preceded by Wilf Paiement | Colorado Rockies captain 1979–80 | Succeeded by Mike Christie |
