= Darryl Edestrand =

Canadian ice hockey player (1945–2017)

- Born: November 6, 1945 Strathroy, Ontario, Canada
- Died: October 8, 2017 (aged 71) Toronto, Ontario, Canada
- Height: 5 ft 11 in (180 cm)
- Weight: 180 lb (82 kg; 12 st 12 lb)
- Position: Defence
- Shot: Left
- Played for: Boston Bruins; Pittsburgh Penguins; Los Angeles Kings; St. Louis Blues; Rochester Americans; Kansas City Blues; Quebec Aces; Hershey Bears; Binghamton Dusters
- Playing career: 1963–1980

Darryl Edestrand (November 6, 1945 – October 8, 2017) was a Canadian professional ice hockey defenceman who played 455 games in the National Hockey League (NHL) for the St. Louis Blues, Philadelphia Flyers, Pittsburgh Penguins, Boston Bruins, and Los Angeles Kings. He featured in two Stanley Cup Finals with the Bruins. He had been traded from the Penguins to the Bruins for Nick Beverley.

He died on October 8, 2017.

== Career statistics ==
			Regular Season					Playoffs
Season	Team	League	GP	G	A	Pts	PIM	GP	G	A	Pts	PIM
1963–64	London Nationals	OHA-B	—	15	30	45	144	—	—	—	—	—
1964–65	Toronto Marlboros	OHA	5	0	0	0	0	—	—	—	—	—
1965–66	London Nationals	OHA	45	4	20	24	132	—	—	—	—	—
1965–66	Rochester Americans	AHL	17	1	2	3	10	—	—	—	—	—
1966–67	Rochester Americans	AHL	7	0	1	1	4	—	—	—	—	—
1967–68	St. Louis Blues	NHL	12	0	0	0	2	—	—	—	—	—
1967–68	Kansas City Blues	CPHL	53	2	32	34	84	7	0	3	3	4
1968–69	Quebec Aces	AHL	74	7	23	30	108	15	1	5	6	23
1969–70	Philadelphia Flyers	NHL	2	0	0	0	6	—	—	—	—	—
1969–70	Quebec Aces	AHL	71	10	30	40	106	6	0	1	1	8
1970–71	Hershey Bears	AHL	72	6	30	36	109	4	0	0	0	2
1971–72	Pittsburgh Penguins	NHL	77	10	23	33	52	4	0	2	2	0
1972–73	Pittsburgh Penguins	NHL	78	15	24	39	88	—	—	—	—	—
1973–74	Pittsburgh Penguins	NHL	3	0	0	0	0	—	—	—	—	—
1973–74	Boston Bruins	NHL	52	3	8	11	20	16	1	2	3	15
1974–75	Boston Bruins	NHL	68	1	9	10	56	3	0	1	1	7
1975–76	Boston Bruins	NHL	77	4	17	21	103	12	1	3	4	23
1976–77	Rochester Americans	AHL	42	4	13	17	62	12	1	3	4	8
1976–77	Boston Bruins	NHL	17	0	3	3	16	3	0	0	0	2
1977–78	Rochester Americans	AHL	64	6	27	33	28	—	—	—	—	—
1977–78	Boston Bruins	NHL	1	0	0	0	0	—	—	—	—	—
1977–78	Los Angeles Kings	NHL	13	0	2	2	15	2	1	1	2	4
1978–79	Los Angeles Kings	NHL	55	1	4	5	46	2	0	0	0	6
1979–80	Binghamton Dusters	AHL	57	3	17	20	34	—	—	—	—	—
NHL totals			455	34	90	124	404	24	3	9	12	57
