= List of Chicago Blackhawks award winners =

Chicago Blackhawks awards
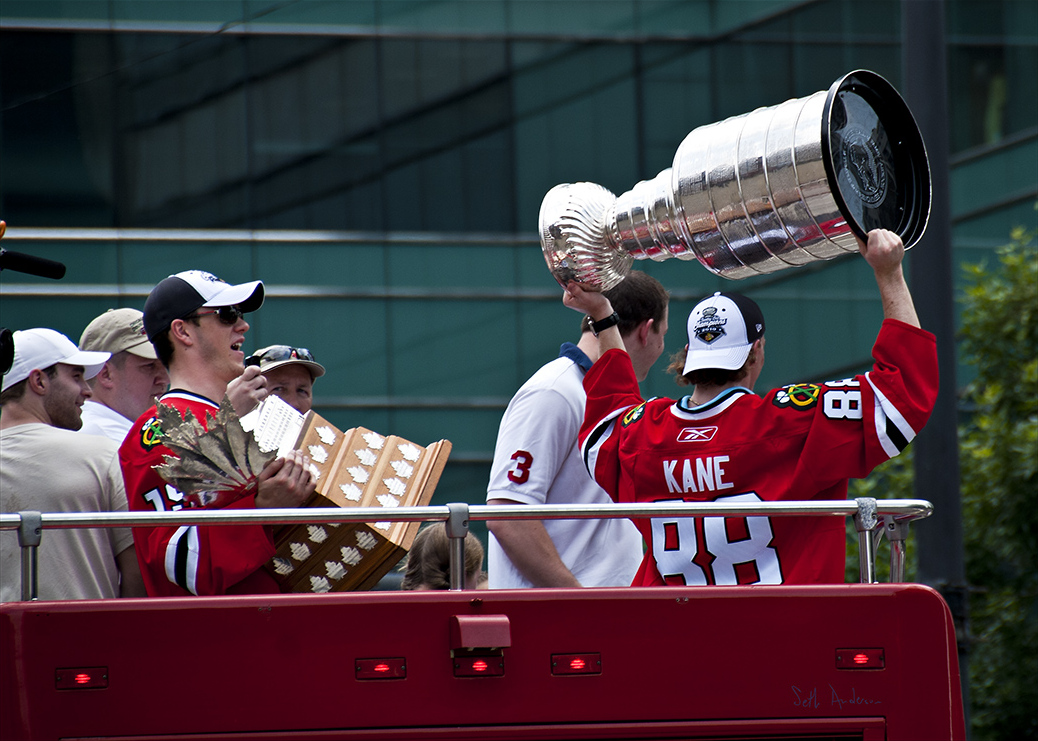
- Jonathan Toews holding the Conn Smythe Trophy and Patrick Kane lifting the Stanley Cup in 2010.

Team trophies
- Award*: Wins
- Stanley Cup: 6
- Clarence S. Campbell Bowl: 7
- Prince of Wales Trophy: 2
- Presidents' Trophy: 2
- O'Brien Trophy: 1

Individual awards
- Award*: Wins
- Art Ross Trophy: 9
- Bill Masterton Memorial Trophy: 2
- Calder Memorial Trophy: 9
- Conn Smythe Trophy: 3
- Frank J. Selke Trophy: 3
- Hart Memorial Trophy: 7
- Jack Adams Award: 1
- James Norris Memorial Trophy: 8
- Lady Byng Memorial Trophy: 8
- Lester Patrick Trophy: 7
- Mark Messier Leadership Award: 1
- Ted Lindsay Award: 1
- Vezina Trophy: 10
- William M. Jennings Trophy: 5

Total
- Awards won: 92

The Chicago Blackhawks are a professional ice hockey team based in Chicago, Illinois. They are members of the Central Division of the Western Conference in the National Hockey League (NHL). The club was founded in 1926 as one of the League's first American franchises and are today part of the NHL's "Original Six" teams—a term reserved for the six teams that comprised the NHL from the 1942–43 season until the league expanded in 1967.

The Blackhawks have won numerous team and individual awards and honors. They have won the Stanley Cup as the league champions in 1934, 1938, 1961, 2010, 2013, and 2015. The Presidents' Trophy was awarded to the club in the 1990–91 and 2012–13 seasons for finishing with the most points.

== League awards ==
=== Team trophies ===
The Chicago Blackhawks have won the Clarence S. Campbell Bowl as Western (previously the Campbell) Conference champions four times. They won the league championship Stanley Cup six times. They have also won the Presidents' Trophy twice as the top team in the NHL during the regular season.

Team trophies awarded to the Chicago Blackhawks
| Award | Description | Times won | Seasons | References |
|---|---|---|---|---|
| Stanley Cup | NHL championship | 6 | 1933–34, 1937–38, 1960–61, 2009–10, 2012–13, 2014–15 | |
| O'Brien Cup | NHL championship runner-up (1938–50) | 1 | 1943–44 | |
| Clarence S. Campbell Bowl | West Division champions (1967–74) | 3 | 1970–71, 1971–72, 1972–73 | |
| Clarence S. Campbell Bowl | Western Conference playoff championship (1981–present) | 4 | 1991–92, 2009–10, 2012–13, 2014–15 | |
| Prince of Wales Trophy | Regular season championship (1938–67) | 1 | 1966–67 | |
| Prince of Wales Trophy | East Division champions (1967–74) | 1 | 1969–70 | |
| Presidents' Trophy | Most regular season points | 2 | 1990–91, 2012–13 | |

=== Individual awards ===
Individual awards won by Chicago Blackhawks players and staff
| Award | Description | Winner | Season | References |
|---|---|---|---|---|
| Art Ross Trophy | Regular season scoring champion | Roy Conacher | 1948–49 | |
| Art Ross Trophy | Regular season scoring champion | Bobby Hull | 1959–60 | |
| Art Ross Trophy | Regular season scoring champion | Bobby Hull | 1961–62 | |
| Art Ross Trophy | Regular season scoring champion | Bobby Hull | 1965–66 | |
| Art Ross Trophy | Regular season scoring champion | Stan Mikita | 1963–64 | |
| Art Ross Trophy | Regular season scoring champion | Stan Mikita | 1964–65 | |
| Art Ross Trophy | Regular season scoring champion | Stan Mikita | 1966–67 | |
| Art Ross Trophy | Regular season scoring champion | Stan Mikita | 1967–68 | |
| Art Ross Trophy | Regular season scoring champion | Patrick Kane | 2015–16 | |
| Bill Masterton Memorial Trophy | Perseverance, sportsmanship, and dedication to hockey | Pit Martin | 1969–70 | |
| Bill Masterton Memorial Trophy | Perseverance, sportsmanship, and dedication to hockey | Bryan Berard | 2003–04 | |
| Calder Memorial Trophy | Rookie of the year | Mike Karakas | 1935-36 | |
| Calder Memorial Trophy | Rookie of the year | Cully Dahlstrom | 1937–38 | |
| Calder Memorial Trophy | Rookie of the year | Ed Litzenberger | 1954–55 | |
| Calder Memorial Trophy | Rookie of the year | Bill Hay | 1959–60 | |
| Calder Memorial Trophy | Rookie of the year | Tony Esposito | 1969–70 | |
| Calder Memorial Trophy | Rookie of the year | Steve Larmer | 1982–83 | |
| Calder Memorial Trophy | Rookie of the year | Ed Belfour | 1990–91 | |
| Calder Memorial Trophy | Rookie of the year | Patrick Kane | 2007–08 | |
| Calder Memorial Trophy | Rookie of the year | Artemi Panarin | 2015–16 | |
| Calder Memorial Trophy | Rookie of the year | Connor Bedard | 2023–24 | |
| Conn Smythe Trophy | Most valuable player of the playoffs | Jonathan Toews | 2009–10 | |
| Conn Smythe Trophy | Most valuable player of the playoffs | Patrick Kane | 2012–13 | |
| Conn Smythe Trophy | Most valuable player of the playoffs | Duncan Keith | 2014–15 | |
| Frank J. Selke Trophy | Forward who demonstrates the most defensive skill | Troy Murray | 1985–86 | |
| Frank J. Selke Trophy | Forward who demonstrates the most defensive skill | Dirk Graham | 1990–91 | |
| Frank J. Selke Trophy | Forward who demonstrates the most defensive skill | Jonathan Toews | 2012–13 | |
| Hart Memorial Trophy | Most Valuable Player | Max Bentley | 1945–46 | |
| Hart Memorial Trophy | Most Valuable Player | Al Rollins | 1953–54 | |
| Hart Memorial Trophy | Most Valuable Player | Bobby Hull | 1964–65 | |
| Hart Memorial Trophy | Most Valuable Player | Bobby Hull | 1965–66 | |
| Hart Memorial Trophy | Most Valuable Player | Stan Mikita | 1966–67 | |
| Hart Memorial Trophy | Most Valuable Player | Stan Mikita | 1967–68 | |
| Hart Memorial Trophy | Most Valuable Player | Patrick Kane | 2015–16 | |
| Jack Adams Award | Coach of the year | Orval Tessier | 1982–83 | |
| James Norris Memorial Trophy | Defense player of the year | Pierre Pilote | 1962–63 | |
| James Norris Memorial Trophy | Defense player of the year | Pierre Pilote | 1963–64 | |
| James Norris Memorial Trophy | Defense player of the year | Pierre Pilote | 1964–65 | |
| James Norris Memorial Trophy | Defense player of the year | Doug Wilson | 1981–82 | |
| James Norris Memorial Trophy | Defense player of the year | Chris Chelios | 1992–93 | |
| James Norris Memorial Trophy | Defense player of the year | Chris Chelios | 1995–96 | |
| James Norris Memorial Trophy | Defense player of the year | Duncan Keith | 2009–10 | |
| James Norris Memorial Trophy | Defense player of the year | Duncan Keith | 2013–14 | |
| Lady Byng Memorial Trophy | Gentlemanly conduct | Elwin Romnes | 1935–36 | |
| Lady Byng Memorial Trophy | Gentlemanly conduct | Max Bentley | 1942–43 | |
| Lady Byng Memorial Trophy | Gentlemanly conduct | Clint Smith | 1943–44 | |
| Lady Byng Memorial Trophy | Gentlemanly conduct | Bill Mosienko | 1944–45 | |
| Lady Byng Memorial Trophy | Gentlemanly conduct | Ken Wharram | 1963–64 | |
| Lady Byng Memorial Trophy | Gentlemanly conduct | Bobby Hull | 1964–65 | |
| Lady Byng Memorial Trophy | Gentlemanly conduct | Stan Mikita | 1966–67 | |
| Lady Byng Memorial Trophy | Gentlemanly conduct | Stan Mikita | 1967–68 | |
| Mark Messier Leadership Award | Player who exemplifies leadership on and off the ice | Jonathan Toews | 2014–15 | |
| Ted Lindsay Award | Most valuable player as chosen by the players | Patrick Kane | 2015–16 | |
| Vezina Trophy | Fewest goals given up in the regular season (1927–1981) | Chuck Gardiner | 1931–32 | |
| Vezina Trophy | Fewest goals given up in the regular season (1927–1981) | Chuck Gardiner | 1933–34 | |
| Vezina Trophy | Fewest goals given up in the regular season (1927–1981) | Lorne Chabot | 1934–35 | |
| Vezina Trophy | Fewest goals given up in the regular season (1927–1981) | Glenn Hall | 1962–63 | |
| Vezina Trophy | Fewest goals given up in the regular season (1927–1981) | Glenn Hall | 1966–67 | |
| Vezina Trophy | Fewest goals given up in the regular season (1927–1981) | Denis DeJordy | 1966–67 | |
| Vezina Trophy | Fewest goals given up in the regular season (1927–1981) | Tony Esposito | 1969–70 | |
| Vezina Trophy | Fewest goals given up in the regular season (1927–1981) | Tony Esposito | 1971–72 | |
| Vezina Trophy | Fewest goals given up in the regular season (1927–1981) | Gary Smith | 1971–72 | |
| Vezina Trophy | Fewest goals given up in the regular season (1927–1981) | Tony Esposito | 1973–74 | |
| Vezina Trophy | Top goaltender (1981–present) | Ed Belfour | 1990–91 | |
| Vezina Trophy | Top goaltender (1981–present) | Ed Belfour | 1992–93 | |
| William M. Jennings Trophy | Fewest goals given up in the regular season (1981–present) | Ed Belfour | 1990–91 | |
| William M. Jennings Trophy | Fewest goals given up in the regular season (1981–present) | Ed Belfour | 1992–93 | |
| William M. Jennings Trophy | Fewest goals given up in the regular season (1981–present) | Ed Belfour | 1994–95 | |
| William M. Jennings Trophy | Fewest goals given up in the regular season (1981–present) | Corey Crawford | 2012–13 | |
| William M. Jennings Trophy | Fewest goals given up in the regular season (1981–present) | Ray Emery | 2012–13 | |
| William M. Jennings Trophy | Fewest goals given up in the regular season (1981–present) | Corey Crawford | 2014–15 (Note: Shared with Carey Price of the Montreal Canadiens.) | |

== All-Stars ==
=== NHL first and second team All-Stars ===
The NHL first and second team All-Stars are the top players at each position as voted on by the Professional Hockey Writers' Association.

Chicago Blackhawks selected to the NHL First and Second Team All-Stars
| Player | Position | Selections | Season | Team |
|---|---|---|---|---|
| Ed Belfour | Goaltender | 3 | 1990–91 | 1st |
| Ed Belfour | Goaltender | 3 | 1992–93 | 1st |
| Ed Belfour | Goaltender | 3 | 1994–95 | 2nd |
| Doug Bentley | Left wing | 4 | 1942–43 | 1st |
| Doug Bentley | Left wing | 4 | 1943–44 | 1st |
| Doug Bentley | Left wing | 4 | 1946–47 | 1st |
| Doug Bentley | Center | 4 | 1948–49 | 2nd |
| Max Bentley | Center | 2 | 1945–46 | 1st |
| Max Bentley | Center | 2 | 1946–47 | 2nd |
| Lorne Chabot | Goaltender | 1 | 1934–35 | 1st |
| Chris Chelios | Defense | 5 | 1990–91 | 2nd |
| Chris Chelios | Defense | 5 | 1992–93 | 1st |
| Chris Chelios | Defense | 5 | 1994–95 | 1st |
| Chris Chelios | Defense | 5 | 1995–96 | 1st |
| Chris Chelios | Defense | 5 | 1996–97 | 2nd |
| Lionel Conacher | Defense | 1 | 1933–34 | 1st |
| Roy Conacher | Left wing | 1 | 1948–49 | 1st |
| Art Coulter | Defense | 1 | 1934–35 | 2nd |
| Tony Esposito | Goaltender | 5 | 1969–70 | 1st |
| Tony Esposito | Goaltender | 5 | 1971–72 | 1st |
| Tony Esposito | Goaltender | 5 | 1972–73 | 2nd |
| Tony Esposito | Goaltender | 5 | 1973–74 | 2nd |
| Tony Esposito | Goaltender | 5 | 1979–80 | 1st |
| Bill Gadsby | Defense | 2 | 1952–53 | 2nd |
| Bill Gadsby | Defense | 2 | 1953–54 | 2nd |
| Charlie Gardiner | Goaltender | 4 | 1930–31 | 1st |
| Charlie Gardiner | Goaltender | 4 | 1931–32 | 1st |
| Charlie Gardiner | Goaltender | 4 | 1932–33 | 2nd |
| Charlie Gardiner | Goaltender | 4 | 1933–34 | 1st |
| Johnny Gottselig | Left wing | 2 | 1938–39 | 2nd |
| Johnny Gottselig | Coach | 2 | 1945–46 | 2nd |
| Glenn Hall | Goaltender | 8 | 1957–58 | 1st |
| Glenn Hall | Goaltender | 8 | 1959–60 | 1st |
| Glenn Hall | Goaltender | 8 | 1960–61 | 2nd |
| Glenn Hall | Goaltender | 8 | 1961–62 | 2nd |
| Glenn Hall | Goaltender | 8 | 1962–63 | 1st |
| Glenn Hall | Goaltender | 8 | 1963–64 | 1st |
| Glenn Hall | Goaltender | 8 | 1965–66 | 1st |
| Glenn Hall | Goaltender | 8 | 1966–67 | 2nd |
| Bobby Hull | Left wing | 12 | 1959–60 | 1st |
| Bobby Hull | Left wing | 12 | 1961–62 | 1st |
| Bobby Hull | Left wing | 12 | 1962–63 | 2nd |
| Bobby Hull | Left wing | 12 | 1963–64 | 1st |
| Bobby Hull | Left wing | 12 | 1964–65 | 1st |
| Bobby Hull | Left wing | 12 | 1965–66 | 1st |
| Bobby Hull | Left wing | 12 | 1966–67 | 1st |
| Bobby Hull | Left wing | 12 | 1967–68 | 1st |
| Bobby Hull | Left wing | 12 | 1968–69 | 1st |
| Bobby Hull | Left wing | 12 | 1969–70 | 1st |
| Bobby Hull | Left wing | 12 | 1970–71 | 2nd |
| Bobby Hull | Left wing | 12 | 1971–72 | 1st |
| Dennis Hull | Right wing | 1 | 1972–73 | 2nd |
| Dick Irvin | Coach | 1 | 1930–31 | 2nd |
| Patrick Kane | Right wing | 4 | 2009–10 | 1st |
| Patrick Kane | Right wing | 4 | 2015–16 | 1st |
| Patrick Kane | Right wing | 4 | 2016–17 | 1st |
| Patrick Kane | Right wing | 4 | 2018–19 | 2nd |
| Mike Karakas | Goaltender | 1 | 1944–45 | 2nd |
| Duncan Keith | Defense | 3 | 2009–10 | 1st |
| Duncan Keith | Defense | 3 | 2013–14 | 1st |
| Duncan Keith | Defense | 3 | 2016–17 | 2nd |
| Ed Litzenberger | Center | 1 | 1956–57 | 2nd |
| Stan Mikita | Center | 8 | 1961–62 | 1st |
| Stan Mikita | Center | 8 | 1962–63 | 1st |
| Stan Mikita | Center | 8 | 1963–64 | 1st |
| Stan Mikita | Center | 8 | 1964–65 | 2nd |
| Stan Mikita | Center | 8 | 1965–66 | 1st |
| Stan Mikita | Center | 8 | 1966–67 | 1st |
| Stan Mikita | Center | 8 | 1967–68 | 1st |
| Stan Mikita | Center | 8 | 1969–70 | 2nd |
| Bill Mosienko | Right wing | 2 | 1944–45 | 2nd |
| Bill Mosienko | Right wing | 2 | 1945–46 | 2nd |
| Artemi Panarin | Left wing | 1 | 2016–17 | 2nd |
| Pierre Pilote | Defense | 8 | 1959–60 | 2nd |
| Pierre Pilote | Defense | 8 | 1960–61 | 2nd |
| Pierre Pilote | Defense | 8 | 1961–62 | 2nd |
| Pierre Pilote | Defense | 8 | 1962–63 | 1st |
| Pierre Pilote | Defense | 8 | 1963–64 | 1st |
| Pierre Pilote | Defense | 8 | 1964–65 | 1st |
| Pierre Pilote | Defense | 8 | 1965–66 | 1st |
| Pierre Pilote | Defense | 8 | 1966–67 | 1st |
| Bud Poile | Right wing | 1 | 1947–48 | 2nd |
| Denis Savard | Center | 1 | 1982–83 | 2nd |
| Earl Seibert | Defense | 9 | 1935–36 | 2nd |
| Earl Seibert | Defense | 9 | 1936–37 | 2nd |
| Earl Seibert | Defense | 9 | 1937–38 | 2nd |
| Earl Seibert | Defense | 9 | 1938–39 | 2nd |
| Earl Seibert | Defense | 9 | 1939–40 | 2nd |
| Earl Seibert | Defense | 9 | 1940–41 | 2nd |
| Earl Seibert | Defense | 9 | 1941–42 | 1st |
| Earl Seibert | Defense | 9 | 1942–43 | 1st |
| Earl Seibert | Defense | 9 | 1943–44 | 1st |
| Pat Stapleton | Defense | 3 | 1965–66 | 2nd |
| Pat Stapleton | Defense | 3 | 1970–71 | 2nd |
| Pat Stapleton | Defense | 3 | 1971–72 | 2nd |
| Gaye Stewart | Left wing | 1 | 1947–48 | 2nd |
| Paul Thompson | Left wing | 4 | 1935–36 | 2nd |
| Paul Thompson | Left wing | 4 | 1937–38 | 1st |
| Paul Thompson | Coach | 4 | 1939–40 | 1st |
| Paul Thompson | Coach | 4 | 1941–42 | 2nd |
| Jonathan Toews | Center | 1 | 2012–13 | 2nd |
| Elmer Vasko | Defense | 2 | 1962–63 | 2nd |
| Elmer Vasko | Defense | 2 | 1963–64 | 2nd |
| Kenny Wharram | Right wing | 2 | 1963–64 | 1st |
| Kenny Wharram | Right wing | 2 | 1966–67 | 1st |
| Bill White | Defense | 3 | 1971–72 | 2nd |
| Bill White | Defense | 3 | 1972–73 | 2nd |
| Bill White | Defense | 3 | 1973–74 | 2nd |
| Doug Wilson | Defense | 3 | 1981–82 | 1st |
| Doug Wilson | Defense | 3 | 1984–85 | 2nd |
| Doug Wilson | Defense | 3 | 1989–90 | 2nd |

=== NHL All-Rookie Team ===
The NHL All-Rookie Team consists of the top rookies at each position as voted on by the Professional Hockey Writers' Association.

Chicago Blackhawks selected to the NHL All-Rookie Team
| Player | Position | Season |
|---|---|---|
| Tyler Arnason | Forward | 2002–03 |
| Connor Bedard | Forward | 2023–24 |
| Ed Belfour | Goaltender | 1990–91 |
| Corey Crawford | Goaltender | 2010–11 |
| Eric Daze | Forward | 1995–96 |
| Dominik Hasek | Goaltender | 1991–92 |
| Patrick Kane | Forward | 2007–08 |
| Dominik Kubalik | Forward | 2019–20 |
| Steve Larmer | Forward | 1982–83 |
| Artemi Panarin | Forward | 2015–16 |
| Darren Pang | Goaltender | 1987–88 |
| Brandon Saad | Forward | 2012–13 |
| Jonathan Toews | Forward | 2007–08 |
| Kris Versteeg | Forward | 2008–09 |

=== All-Star Game selections ===
The National Hockey League All-Star Game is a mid-season exhibition game held annually between many of the top players of each season. Sixty-four All-Star Games have been held since 1947, with at least one player chosen to represent the Blackhawks in each year except 2004. The All-Star game has not been held in various years: 1979 and 1987 due to the 1979 Challenge Cup and Rendez-vous '87 series between the NHL and the Soviet national team, respectively, 1995, 2005, and 2013 as a result of labor stoppages, 2006, 2010, 2014 and 2026 because of the Winter Olympic Games, 2021 as a result of the COVID-19 pandemic, and 2025 when it was replaced by the 2025 4 Nations Face-Off. Chicago has hosted four of the games. The 2nd, 15th, 27th, and 42nd games all took place at Chicago Stadium.

- † Selected by fan vote
- ‡ Selected by Commissioner
- ↑ All-Star Game Most Valuable Player

Chicago Blackhawks players and coaches selected to the All-Star Game
| Game | Year | Name | Position | References |
|---|---|---|---|---|
| 1st | 1947 | Doug Bentley | Left wing | |
| 1st | 1947 | Max Bentley | Center | |
| 1st | 1947 | Bill Mosienko | Right wing | |
| 2nd | 1948 | Doug Bentley | Left wing | |
| 2nd | 1948 | Bud Poile | Center | |
| 2nd | 1948 | Gaye Stewart | Left wing | |
| 3rd | 1949 | Doug Bentley | Left wing | |
| 3rd | 1949 | Roy Conacher | Left wing | |
| 3rd | 1949 | Bob Goldham | Defense | |
| 3rd | 1949 | Bill Mosienko | Right wing | |
| 4th | 1950 | Doug Bentley | Left wing | |
| 4th | 1950 | Bill Mosienko | Right wing | |
| 4th | 1950 | Jack Stewart | Defense | |
| 5th | 1951 | Doug Bentley | Left wing | |
| 5th | 1951 | Gus Bodnar | Center | |
| 5th | 1951 | Al Dewsbury | Defense | |
| 5th | 1951 | Lee Fogolin | Defense | |
| 5th | 1951 | Harry Lumley | Goaltender | |
| 6th | 1952 | Bill Mosienko | Right wing | |
| 7th | 1953 | Bill Gadsby | Defense | |
| 7th | 1953 | Gus Mortson | Defense | |
| 7th | 1953 | Bill Mosienko | Right wing | |
| 8th | 1954 | Bill Gadsby | Defense | |
| 8th | 1954 | Gus Mortson | Defense | |
| 8th | 1954 | Al Rollins | Goaltender | |
| 9th | 1955 | Dick Irvin | Coach | |
| 9th | 1955 | Ed Litzenberger | Right wing | |
| 9th | 1955 | Frank Martin | Defense | |
| 9th | 1955 | Allan Stanley | Defense | |
| 9th | 1955 | Red Sullivan | Center | |
| 9th | 1955 | Harry Watson | Left wing | |
| 10th | 1956 | Wally Hergesheimer | Right wing | |
| 10th | 1956 | Nick Mickoski | Left wing | |
| 10th | 1956 | Gus Mortson | Defense | |
| 10th | 1956 | Red Sullivan | Center | |
| 10th | 1956 | Johnny Wilson | Left wing | |
| 11th | 1957 | Ed Litzenberger | Right wing | |
| 12th | 1958 | Glenn Hall | Goaltender | |
| 12th | 1958 | Ed Litzenberger | Right wing | |
| 12th | 1958 | Dollard St. Laurent | Defense | |
| 13th | 1959 | Ed Litzenberger | Right wing | |
| 14th | 1960 | Glenn Hall | Goaltender | |
| 14th | 1960 | Billy Hay | Center | |
| 14th | 1960 | Bobby Hull | Left wing | |
| 14th | 1960 | Pierre Pilote | Defense | |
| 15th | 1961 | Jack Evans | Defense | |
| 15th | 1961 | Reggie Fleming | Left wing | |
| 15th | 1961 | Glenn Hall | Goaltender | |
| 15th | 1961 | Murray Hall | Center | |
| 15th | 1961 | Billy Hay | Center | |
| 15th | 1961 | Bronco Horvath | Center | |
| 15th | 1961 | Bobby Hull | Left wing | |
| 15th | 1961 | Chico Maki | Right wing | |
| 15th | 1961 | Ab McDonald | Left wing | |
| 15th | 1961 | Gerry Melnyk | Center | |
| 15th | 1961 | Stan Mikita (Did not play) | Center | |
| 15th | 1961 | Ron Murphy | Left wing | |
| 15th | 1961 | Eric Nesterenko | Right wing | |
| 15th | 1961 | Pierre Pilote | Defense | |
| 15th | 1961 | Rudy Pilous | Coach | |
| 15th | 1961 | Dollard St. Laurent | Defense | |
| 15th | 1961 | Bob Turner | Defense | |
| 15th | 1961 | Elmer Vasko | Defense | |
| 15th | 1961 | Kenny Wharram | Right wing | |
| 16th | 1962 | Glenn Hall | Goaltender | |
| 16th | 1962 | Bobby Hull | Left wing | |
| 16th | 1962 | Pierre Pilote | Defense | |
| 16th | 1962 | Rudy Pilous | Coach | |
| 17th | 1963 | Glenn Hall | Goaltender | |
| 17th | 1963 | Bobby Hull | Left wing | |
| 17th | 1963 | Pierre Pilote | Defense | |
| 17th | 1963 | Elmer Vasko | Defense | |
| 18th | 1964 | Glenn Hall | Goaltender | |
| 18th | 1964 | Bobby Hull | Left wing | |
| 18th | 1964 | Stan Mikita | Center | |
| 18th | 1964 | Pierre Pilote | Defense | |
| 18th | 1964 | Elmer Vasko | Defense | |
| 19th | 1965 | Glenn Hall | Goaltender | |
| 19th | 1965 | Bobby Hull | Left wing | |
| 19th | 1965 | Doug Mohns | Defense | |
| 19th | 1965 | Eric Nesterenko | Right wing | |
| 19th | 1965 | Pierre Pilote | Defense | |
| 19th | 1965 | Billy Reay | Coach | |
| 20th | 1967 | Glenn Hall | Goaltender | |
| 20th | 1967 | Bobby Hull | Left wing | |
| 20th | 1967 | Stan Mikita | Center | |
| 20th | 1967 | Pierre Pilote | Defense | |
| 20th | 1967 | Pat Stapleton | Defense | |
| 21st | 1968 | Bobby Hull | Left wing | |
| 21st | 1968 | Stan Mikita | Center | |
| 21st | 1968 | Pierre Pilote | Defense | |
| 21st | 1968 | Kenny Wharram | Right wing | |
| 22nd | 1969 | Bobby Hull | Left wing | |
| 22nd | 1969 | Dennis Hull | Left wing | |
| 22nd | 1969 | Stan Mikita | Center | |
| 22nd | 1969 | Pat Stapleton | Defense | |
| 23rd | 1970 | Tony Esposito | Goaltender | |
| 23rd | 1970 | Bobby Hull↑ | Left wing | |
| 24th | 1971 | Tony Esposito | Goaltender | |
| 24th | 1971 | Bobby Hull↑ | Left wing | |
| 24th | 1971 | Dennis Hull | Left wing | |
| 24th | 1971 | Keith Magnuson | Defense | |
| 24th | 1971 | Chico Maki | Right wing | |
| 24th | 1971 | Pit Martin | Center | |
| 24th | 1971 | Stan Mikita | Center | |
| 24th | 1971 | Pat Stapleton | Defense | |
| 24th | 1971 | Bill White | Defense | |
| 25th | 1972 | Tony Esposito | Goaltender | |
| 25th | 1972 | Bobby Hull | Left wing | |
| 25th | 1972 | Dennis Hull | Left wing | |
| 25th | 1972 | Keith Magnuson | Defense | |
| 25th | 1972 | Chico Maki | Right wing | |
| 25th | 1972 | Pit Martin | Center | |
| 25th | 1972 | Stan Mikita | Center | |
| 25th | 1972 | Billy Reay | Coach | |
| 25th | 1972 | Pat Stapleton | Defense | |
| 25th | 1972 | Bill White | Defense | |
| 26th | 1973 | Tony Esposito | Goaltender | |
| 26th | 1973 | Dennis Hull | Left wing | |
| 26th | 1973 | Pit Martin | Center | |
| 26th | 1973 | Stan Mikita | Center | |
| 26th | 1973 | Jim Pappin | Right wing | |
| 26th | 1973 | Billy Reay | Coach | |
| 26th | 1973 | Bill White | Defense | |
| 27th | 1974 | Tony Esposito | Goaltender | |
| 27th | 1974 | Dennis Hull | Left wing | |
| 27th | 1974 | Pit Martin | Center | |
| 27th | 1974 | Stan Mikita | Center | |
| 27th | 1974 | Jim Pappin | Right wing | |
| 27th | 1974 | Billy Reay | Coach | |
| 27th | 1974 | Bill White | Defense | |
| 28th | 1975 | Doug Jarrett | Defense | |
| 28th | 1975 | Stan Mikita | Center | |
| 28th | 1975 | Jim Pappin | Right wing | |
| 29th | 1976 | John Marks | Left wing | |
| 29th | 1976 | Phil Russell | Defense | |
| 30th | 1977 | Phil Russell | Defense | |
| 31st | 1978 | Ivan Boldirev | Center | |
| 32nd | 1980 | Tony Esposito | Goaltender | |
| 33rd | 1981 | Bob Murray | Defense | |
| 34th | 1982 | Denis Savard | Center | |
| 34th | 1982 | Al Secord | Left wing | |
| 34th | 1982 | Doug Wilson | Defense | |
| 35th | 1983 | Murray Bannerman | Goaltender | |
| 35th | 1983 | Bob Murray | Defense | |
| 35th | 1983 | Denis Savard | Center | |
| 35th | 1983 | Al Secord | Left wing | |
| 35th | 1983 | Doug Wilson | Defense | |
| 36th | 1984 | Murray Bannerman | Goaltender | |
| 36th | 1984 | Denis Savard | Center | |
| 36th | 1984 | Doug Wilson | Defense | |
| 37th | 1985 | Doug Wilson | Defense | |
| 38th | 1986 | Denis Savard | Center | |
| 38th | 1986 | Doug Wilson† | Defense | |
| 39th | 1988 | Denis Savard | Center | |
| 39th | 1988 | Doug Wilson† (Did not play) | Defense | |
| 40th | 1989 | Dave Manson | Defense | |
| 41st | 1990 | Steve Larmer | Right wing | |
| 41st | 1990 | Doug Wilson | Defense | |
| 42nd | 1991 | Chris Chelios† | Defense | |
| 42nd | 1991 | Steve Larmer | Right wing | |
| 42nd | 1991 | Jeremy Roenick | Center | |
| 43rd | 1992 | Ed Belfour† | Goaltender | |
| 43rd | 1992 | Chris Chelios† | Defense | |
| 43rd | 1992 | Jeremy Roenick | Center | |
| 44th | 1993 | Ed Belfour† | Goaltender | |
| 44th | 1993 | Chris Chelios† | Defense | |
| 44th | 1993 | Mike Keenan | Coach | |
| 44th | 1993 | Jeremy Roenick | Center | |
| 45th | 1994 | Chris Chelios† | Defense | |
| 45th | 1994 | Jeremy Roenick | Center | |
| 46th | 1996 | Ed Belfour† | Goaltender | |
| 46th | 1996 | Chris Chelios† | Defense | |
| 46th | 1996 | Denis Savard‡ | Center | |
| 47th | 1997 | Tony Amonte | Right wing | |
| 47th | 1997 | Chris Chelios† | Defense | |
| 48th | 1998 | Tony Amonte | Right wing | |
| 48th | 1998 | Chris Chelios | Defense | |
| 49th | 1999 | Tony Amonte | Right wing | |
| 50th | 2000 | Tony Amonte | Right wing | |
| 51st | 2001 | Tony Amonte | Right wing | |
| 52nd | 2002 | Eric Daze↑ | Left wing | |
| 52nd | 2002 | Alexei Zhamnov | Center | |
| 53rd | 2003 | Jocelyn Thibault | Goaltender | |
| 54th | 2004 | No Blackhawks selected | — | |
| 55th | 2007 | Martin Havlat | Right wing | |
| 56th | 2008 | Duncan Keith | Defense | |
| 57th | 2009 | Brian Campbell† | Defense | |
| 57th | 2009 | Patrick Kane† | Right wing | |
| 57th | 2009 | Jonathan Toews† | Center | |
| 58th | 2011 | Mike Haviland | Assistant coach | |
| 58th | 2011 | Patrick Kane | Right wing | |
| 58th | 2011 | Duncan Keith† | Defense | |
| 58th | 2011 | Joel Quenneville | Coach | |
| 58th | 2011 | Patrick Sharp↑ | Center | |
| 58th | 2011 | Jonathan Toews† | Center | |
| 59th | 2012 | Marian Hossa | Right wing | |
| 59th | 2012 | Patrick Kane | Right wing | |
| 59th | 2012 | Jonathan Toews (Did not play) | Center | |
| 60th | 2015 | Corey Crawford† | Goaltender | |
| 60th | 2015 | Patrick Kane† | Right wing | |
| 60th | 2015 | Duncan Keith† | Defense | |
| 60th | 2015 | Brent Seabrook† | Defense | |
| 60th | 2015 | Jonathan Toews† | Center | |
| 61st | 2016 | Patrick Kane† | Right wing | |
| 61st | 2016 | Jonathan Toews (Did not play) | Center | |
| 62nd | 2017 | Corey Crawford | Goaltender | |
| 62nd | 2017 | Patrick Kane | Right wing | |
| 62nd | 2017 | Duncan Keith | Defense | |
| 62nd | 2017 | Jonathan Toews | Center | |
| 63rd | 2018 | Patrick Kane | Right wing | |
| 64th | 2019 | Patrick Kane | Right wing | |
| 65th | 2020 | Patrick Kane | Right wing | |
| 66th | 2022 | Alex DeBrincat | Right wing | |
| 67th | 2023 | Seth Jones | Defense | |
| 68th | 2024 | Connor Bedard (Did not play) | Center | |

=== All-Star benefit games ===
Prior to the institution of the National Hockey League All-Star Game the league held three different benefit games featuring teams of all-stars. The first was the Ace Bailey Benefit Game, held in 1934, after a violent collision with Eddie Shore of the Boston Bruins left Ace Bailey of the Toronto Maple Leafs hospitalized and unable to continue his playing career. In 1937 the Howie Morenz Memorial Game was held to raise money for the family of Howie Morenz of the Montreal Canadiens who died from complications after being admitted to the hospital for a broken leg. The Babe Siebert Memorial Game was held in 1939 to raise funds for the family of the Canadiens' Babe Siebert who drowned shortly after he retired from playing.

Chicago Blackhawks players and coaches selected to All-Star benefit games
| Game | Year | Name | Position | References |
|---|---|---|---|---|
| Ace Bailey Benefit Game | 1934 | Lionel Conacher | Defense | |
| Ace Bailey Benefit Game | 1934 | Charlie Gardiner | Goaltender | |
| Howie Morenz Memorial Game | 1937 | Johnny Gottselig | Left wing | |
| Howie Morenz Memorial Game | 1937 | Mush March | Right wing | |
| Babe Siebert Memorial Game | 1939 | Johnny Gottselig | Left wing | |
| Babe Siebert Memorial Game | 1939 | Earl Seibert | Defense | |

=== All-Star Game replacement events ===
Chicago Blackhawks players and coaches selected to All-Star Game replacement events
| Event | Year | Name | Position | References |
|---|---|---|---|---|
| Challenge Cup | 1979 | Tony Esposito (Did not play) | Goaltender | |
| Rendez-vous '87 | 1987 | Doug Wilson | Defense | |
| 4 Nations Face-Off | 2025 | Teuvo Teräväinen (Finland) | Left wing | |

== Career achievements ==
=== Hockey Hall of Fame ===
The following is a list of Chicago Blackhawks who have been enshrined in the Hockey Hall of Fame.

Chicago Blackhawks inducted into the Hockey Hall of Fame
| Individual | Category | Year inducted | Years with Blackhawks in category | References |
|---|---|---|---|---|
| Sid Abel | Player | 1969 | 1952–1953 | |
| Al Arbour | Builder | 1996 | 1958–1961 | |
| Ed Belfour | Player | 2011 | 1988–1997 | |
| Doug Bentley | Player | 1964 | 1939–1952 | |
| Max Bentley | Player | 1966 | 1940–1948 | |
| Georges Boucher | Player | 1960 | 1931–1932 | |
| Frank Brimsek | Player | 1966 | 1949–1950 | |
| Billy Burch | Player | 1974 | 1932–1933 | |
| Chris Chelios | Player | 2013 | 1990–1999 | |
| Paul Coffey | Player | 2004 | 1998–1999 | |
| Lionel Conacher | Player | 1994 | 1933–1934 | |
| Roy Conacher | Player | 1998 | 1947–1952 | |
| Art Coulter | Player | 1974 | 1931–1936 | |
| Babe Dye | Player | 1970 | 1926–1927 | |
| Phil Esposito | Player | 1984 | 1963–1967 | |
| Tony Esposito | Player | 1988 | 1969–1984 | |
| Bill Gadsby | Player | 1970 | 1946–1954 | |
| Charlie Gardiner | Player | 1945 | 1927–1934 | |
| Herb Gardiner | Player | 1958 | 1928–1929 | |
| Doug Gilmour | Player | 2011 | 1998–2000 | |
| Michel Goulet | Player | 1998 | 1990–1994 | |
| Glenn Hall | Player | 1975 | 1957–1967 | |
| Dominik Hasek | Player | 2014 | 1990–1992 | |
| George Hay | Player | 1958 | 1926–1927 | |
| Marian Hossa | Player | 2020 | 2009–2017 | |
| Phil Housley | Player | 2015 | 2001–2003 | |
| Bobby Hull | Player | 1983 | 1957–1972 | |
| Dick Irvin | Player | 1958 | 1926–1929 | |
| Tommy Ivan | Builder | 1974 | 1954–1977 | |
| Duke Keats | Player | 1958 | 1928–1929 | |
| Duncan Keith | Player | 2025 | 2005-2021 | |
| Hughie Lehman | Player | 1958 | 1926–1928 | |
| Ted Lindsay | Player | 1966 | 1957–1960 | |
| Harry Lumley | Player | 1980 | 1951–1952 | |
| Mickey MacKay | Player | 1952 | 1926–1928 | |
| John Mariucci | Builder | 1985 | 1940–1948 | |
| Frederic McLaughlin | Builder | 1963 | 1926–1944 | |
| Stan Mikita | Player | 1983 | 1958–1980 | |
| Howie Morenz | Player | 1945 | 1934–1936 | |
| Bill Mosienko | Player | 1965 | 1941–1955 | |
| James D. Norris | Builder | 1962 | 1952–1966 | |
| James Norris | Builder | 1958 | | |
| Bert Olmstead | Player | 1985 | 1948–1951 | |
| Bobby Orr | Player | 1979 | 1976–1978 | |
| Pierre Pilote | Player | 1975 | 1955–1968 | |
| Rudy Pilous | Builder | 1985 | 1957–1963 | |
| Bud Poile | Builder | 1990 | 1947–1948 | |
| Denis Savard | Player | 2000 | 1980–1990, 1995–1997 | |
| Earl Seibert | Player | 1963 | 1936–1944 | |
| Clint Smith | Player | 1991 | 1943–1946 | |
| Allan Stanley | Player | 1981 | 1954–1956 | |
| Barney Stanley | Player | 1962 | 1927–1928 | |
| Jack Stewart | Player | 1964 | 1950–1952 | |
| Harry Watson | Player | 1994 | 1954–1957 | |
| Doug Wilson | Player | 2020 | 1977–1991 | |
| Arthur Wirtz | Builder | 1971 | | |
| Bill Wirtz | Builder | 1976 | 1952–2007 | |

=== Foster Hewitt Memorial Award ===
Two members of the Blackhawks organization have been honored with the Foster Hewitt Memorial Award. The award is presented by the Hockey Hall of Fame to members of the radio and television industry who make outstanding contributions to their profession and the game of ice hockey during their broadcasting career.

Members of the Chicago Blackhawks honored with the Foster Hewitt Memorial Award
| Individual | Year honored | Years with Blackhawks as broadcaster | References |
|---|---|---|---|
| Pat Foley | 2014 | 1980–2006, 2008–2022 | |
| Lloyd Pettit | 1986 | 1961–1976 | |

=== Lester Patrick Trophy ===
Eleven members of the Blackhawks organization have been honored with the Lester Patrick Trophy. The trophy has been presented by the National Hockey League and USA Hockey since 1966 to honor a recipient's contribution to ice hockey in the United States. This list includes all personnel who have ever been employed by the Chicago Blackhawks in any capacity and have also received the Lester Patrick Trophy.

Members of the Chicago Blackhawks honored with the Lester Patrick Trophy
| Individual | Year honored | Years with Blackhawks | References |
|---|---|---|---|
| Phil Esposito | 1978 | 1963–1967 | |
| Phil Housley | 2009 | 2001–2003 | |
| Bobby Hull | 1969 | 1957–1972 | |
| Tommy Ivan | 1975 | 1954–1977 | |
| Stan Mikita | 1976 | 1959–1980 | |
| James Norris | 1967 | | |
| James D. Norris | 1972 | 1952–1966 | |
| Bobby Orr | 1979 | 1976–1979 | |
| Bob Pulford | 2011 | 1977–2007 | |
| Arthur Wirtz | 1985 | | |
| Bill Wirtz | 1979 | 1952–2007 | |

=== United States Hockey Hall of Fame ===
Members of the Chicago Blackhawks inducted into the United States Hockey Hall of Fame
| Individual | Year inducted | Years with Blackhawks | References |
|---|---|---|---|
| Taffy Abel | 1973 | 1929–1934 | |
| Tony Amonte | 2009 | 1994–2002 | |
| Frank Brimsek | 1973 | 1949–1950 | |
| Chris Chelios | 2011 | 1990–1999 | |
| Cully Dahlstrom | 1973 | 1937–1945 | |
| Victor Desjardins | 1974 | 1930–1931 | |
| Vic Heyliger | 1974 | 1937–1943 | |
| Phil Housley | 2004 | 2001–2003 | |
| Virgil Johnson | 1974 | 1937–1945 | |
| Mike Karakas | 1973 | 1935–1946 | |
| Sam LoPresti | 1973 | 1940–1942 | |
| John Mariucci | 1973 | 1940–1948 | |
| Ed Olczyk | 2012 | 1984–1987, 1998–2000 | |
| Fido Purpur | 1974 | 1941–1945 | |
| Jeremy Roenick | 2010 | 1988–1996 | |
| Elwin Romnes | 1973 | 1930–1938 | |
| Bill Stewart | 1982 | 1937–1939 | |
| Gary Suter | 2011 | 1994–1998 | |
| Bill Wirtz | 1984 | 1952–2007 | |

=== Retired numbers ===
The Chicago Blackhawks have retired eight numbers for nine different players. The first jersey retired was #21 in honor of Stan Mikita, who played center for the club from 1958 to 1980. Three years later, the Hawks retired Bobby Hull's #9. Goaltenders Glenn Hall (#1) and Tony Esposito (#35) had their numbers retired on the same night in 1988. The number of Denis Savard was raised to the rafters in 1998. #3 was retired for two players in 2008: defensemen Keith Magnuson and Pierre Pilote. The most recent number retired was #7, for Chris Chelios. Also out of circulation is the number 99 which was retired league-wide for Wayne Gretzky on February 6, 2000. Gretzky did not play for the Blackhawks during his 20-year NHL career and no Blackhawks player had ever worn the number 99 prior to its retirement.

Chicago Blackhawks retired numbers
| Number | Player | Position | Years with Blackhawks as a player | Date of retirement ceremony | References |
|---|---|---|---|---|---|
| 1 | Glenn Hall | Goaltender | 1957–1967 | November 20, 1988 | |
| 3 | Keith Magnuson | Defense | 1969–1979 | November 12, 2008 | |
| 3 | Pierre Pilote | Defense | 1956–1968 | November 12, 2008 | |
| 7 | Chris Chelios | Defense | 1990–1999 | February 25, 2024 | |
| 9 | Bobby Hull | Left wing | 1957–1972 | December 18, 1983 | |
| 18 | Denis Savard | Center | 1980–1990, 1995–1997 | March 19, 1998 | |
| 21 | Stan Mikita | Center | 1958–1980 | October 19, 1980 | |
| 35 | Tony Esposito | Goaltender | 1969–1983 | November 20, 1988 | |
| 81 | Marian Hossa | Right wing | 2009–2017 | November 20, 2022 | |

== Other awards ==
Chicago Blackhawks who have received non-NHL awards
| Award | Description | Winner | Year | References |
|---|---|---|---|---|
| Best NHL Player ESPY Award | Best NHL player of the last calendar year | Jonathan Toews | 2015 | |
| Kharlamov Trophy | Most valuable Russian player in NHL | Artemi Panarin | 2015–16 | |
| Lionel Conacher Award | Canada's male athlete of the year | Bobby Hull | 1965 | |
| Lionel Conacher Award | Canada's male athlete of the year | Bobby Hull | 1966 | |

== See also ==
- List of National Hockey League awards
