= 1962 Stanley Cup Final =

1962 ice hockey championship series

	1	2	3	4	5	6	Total
Chicago Black Hawks	1	2	3	4	4	1	2
Toronto Maple Leafs	4	3	0	1	8	2	4
- Location(s): Toronto: Maple Leaf Gardens (1, 2, 5); Chicago: Chicago Stadium (3, 4, 6)
- Coaches: Chicago: Rudy Pilous; Toronto: Punch Imlach
- Captains: Chicago: Pierre Pilote; Toronto: George Armstrong
- Dates: April 10–22, 1962
- Series-winning goal: Dick Duff (14:14, third)
- Hall of Famers: Maple Leafs: Al Arbour (1996, builder); George Armstrong (1975); Johnny Bower (1976); Dick Duff (2006); Tim Horton (1977); Red Kelly (1969); Dave Keon (1986); Frank Mahovlich (1981); Bert Olmstead (1985); Bob Pulford (1991); Allan Stanley (1981); Black Hawks: Glenn Hall (1975); Bill Hay (2015, builder); Bobby Hull (1983); Stan Mikita (1983); Pierre Pilote (1975); Coaches: Punch Imlach (1984); Rudy Pilous (1985); Officials: Neil Armstrong (1991); George Hayes (1988); Matt Pavelich (1987); Frank Udvari (1973)

The 1962 Stanley Cup Final was the championship series of the National Hockey League's (NHL) 1961–62 season, and the culmination of the 1962 Stanley Cup playoffs. It was contested between the defending champion Chicago Black Hawks and the Toronto Maple Leafs who had last appeared in the Final in 1960. The Maple Leafs won the best-of-seven series, four games to two, to win the Stanley Cup, their first since 1951.

== Paths to the Finals ==
Toronto defeated the New York Rangers to advance to the finals and Chicago defeated the Montreal Canadiens.

== Game summaries ==
Stan Mikita broke Gordie Howe's 1955 playoff record of 20 points, finishing with 21, but it was not enough as the Leafs would defeat the Black Hawks. Dave Keon, making his playoff debut, scored two goals and an assist in the Final.

=== Game one ===
April 10	Chicago Black Hawks	1–4	Toronto Maple Leafs	Maple Leaf Gardens	Recap

George Armstrong recorded 3 points in a 4–1 victory for Toronto as they took a 1–0 series lead.

Scoring summary
Period	Team	Goal	Assist(s)	Time	Score
1st	CHI	Bobby Hull (3) – pp	Pierre Pilote (4) and Stan Mikita (11)	03:35	1–0 CHI
2nd	TOR	Dave Keon (4)	Dick Duff (7) and George Armstrong (2)	01:32	1–1
2nd	TOR	Frank Mahovlich (3) – pp	Tim Horton (8) and Ron Stewart (2)	13:54	2–1 TOR
3rd	TOR	George Armstrong (5)	Dick Duff (8)	06:03	3–1 TOR
3rd	TOR	Tim Horton (3)	George Armstrong (3) and Dave Keon (3)	14:32	4–1 TOR
Penalty summary
Period	Team	Player	Penalty	Time	PIM
1st	TOR	Tim Horton	Holding	03:20	2:00
1st	TOR	Dick Duff	Boarding	03:44	2:00
1st	CHI	Jack Evans	Holding	08:24	2:00
1st	CHI	Jack Evans	Roughing	11:49	2:00
1st	CHI	Bobby Hull	Roughing	11:49	2:00
1st	TOR	Bobby Baun	Roughing	11:49	2:00
1st	TOR	Carl Brewer	Roughing	11:49	2:00
1st	CHI	Eric Nesterenko	Holding	11:55	2:00
1st	TOR	Tim Horton	Holding	11:55	2:00
2nd	CHI	Murray Balfour	Holding	04:22	2:00
2nd	TOR	Carl Brewer	High-sticking	10:38	2:00
2nd	CHI	Eric Nesterenko	Roughing	13:43	2:00
2nd	CHI	Eric Nesterenko	High-sticking	14:30	2:00
2nd	CHI	Pierre Pilote	Hooking	17:36	2:00
2nd	TOR	Frank Mahovlich	Holding	19:29	2:00
3rd	CHI	Reg Fleming	Hooking	03:26	2:00
3rd	TOR	Bobby Baun	Holding	17:22	2:00

Shots by period
Team	1	2	3	Total
Chicago	10	9	7	26
Toronto	8	15	14	27

=== Game two ===
April 12	Chicago Black Hawks	2–3	Toronto Maple Leafs	Maple Leaf Gardens	Recap

Although Stan Mikita scored twice for Chicago in game two, the Maple Leafs would win the game by a score of 3–2, giving them a 2–0 lead in the series.

Scoring summary
Period	Team	Goal	Assist(s)	Time	Score
1st	TOR	Billy Harris (3) – pp	Pierre Pilote (4) and Stan Mikita (11)	02:35	1–0 TOR
2nd	None				
3rd	CHI	Stan Mikita (4)	Ab McDonald (5) and Kenny Wharram (4)	08:47	1–1
3rd	TOR	Frank Mahovlich (4)	Ron Stewart (4) and Red Kelly (5)	09:47	2–1 TOR
3rd	TOR	George Armstrong (6)	Dick Duff (9) and Allan Stanley (3)	16:08	3–1 TOR
3rd	CHI	Stan Mikita (5)	Pierre Pilote (5) and Bobby Hull (3)	18:27	3–2 TOR
Penalty summary
Period	Team	Player	Penalty	Time	PIM
1st	CHI	Murray Balfour	Boarding	01:19	2:00
1st	TOR	Dick Duff	Cross-checking	03:57	2:00
1st	CHI	Eric Nesterenko	High-sticking	12:34	2:00
1st	TOR	Carl Brewer	High-sticking	12:34	2:00
1st	TOR	Carl Brewer	Boarding	15:33	2:00
1st	CHI	Pierre Pilote	Cross-checking	17:31	2:00
2nd	CHI	Jack Evans	Hooking	02:17	2:00
2nd	TOR	Bob Nevin	Holding	06:25	2:00
3rd	CHI	Elmer Vasko	Tripping	04:03	2:00
3rd	CHI	Bill Hay	High-sticking	17:04	2:00
3rd	TOR	Carl Brewer	High-sticking	17:04	2:00

Shots by period
Team	1	2	3	Total
Chicago	9	12	10	31
Toronto	10	10	14	34

=== Game three ===
April 15	Toronto Maple Leafs	0–3	Chicago Black Hawks	Chicago Stadium	Recap

Glenn Hall made 19 saves in game three to record his second shutout of the postseason. The Black Hawks won the game 3–0 and cut the series lead in half.

Scoring summary
Period	Team	Goal	Assist(s)	Time	Score
1st	None				
2nd	CHI	Stan Mikita (4)	Pierre Pilote (6) and Ab McDonald (6)	04:35	1–0 CHI
2nd	CHI	Ab McDonald (4) – pp	Pierre Pilote (7) and Bill Hay (4)	08:33	2–0 CHI
3rd	CHI	Bronco Horvath (4) – en	Eric Nesterenko (2)	19:21	3–0 CHI
Penalty summary
Period	Team	Player	Penalty	Time	PIM
1st	CHI	Bobby Hull	High-sticking	02:41	2:00
1st	TOR	Bob Baun	Charging	07:06	2:00
2nd	CHI	Reg Fleming	Roughing	02:03	2:00
2nd	TOR	Tim Horton	Roughing	02:03	2:00
2nd	TOR	Carl Brewer	Holding	07:15	2:00
2nd	CHI	Dollard St. Laurent	Holding	08:51	2:00
2nd	TOR	Eddie Shack	Tripping	14:55	2:00
3rd	CHI	Gerry Melnyk	Roughing	02:42	2:00
3rd	TOR	Eddie Shack	Roughing	02:42	2:00
3rd	TOR	Eddie Shack	Charging	16:14	2:00
3rd	TOR	Dick Duff	Misconduct	19:21	10:00

Shots by period
Team	1	2	3	Total
Toronto	5	8	6	19
Chicago	8	13	15	36

=== Game four ===
April 17	Toronto Maple Leafs	1–4	Chicago Black Hawks	Chicago Stadium	Recap

Bobby Hull and Reg Fleming both scored twice for Chicago in game four, and the Black Hawks won the game 4–1 and tied the series. Toronto also lost goaltender Johnny Bower during the first period to an injury, and he would not return for the remainder of the series. Late in the third period, Frank Mahovlich and Stan Mikita both received major penalties for slashing and were ejected from the game.

Scoring summary
Period	Team	Goal	Assist(s)	Time	Score
1st	CHI	Bobby Hull (6)	Stan Mikita (12)	10:35	1–0 CHI
1st	CHI	Reg Fleming (1)	Eric Nesterenko (3)	15:41	2–0 CHI
1st	TOR	Red Kelly (4) – pp	George Armstrong (4) and Dick Duff (10)	18:08	2–1 CHI
2nd	CHI	Bobby Hull (7) – pp	Bill Hay (5) and Stan Mikita (13)	00:46	3–1 CHI
2nd	CHI	Reg Fleming (2)	Eric Nesterenko (3) and Bronco Horvath (1)	07:31	4–1 CHI
3rd	None				
Penalty summary
Period	Team	Player	Penalty	Time	PIM
1st	CHI	Murray Balfour	Fighting – major	00:17	5:00
1st	TOR	Bobby Baun	Fighting – major	00:17	5:00
1st	TOR	Frank Mahovlich	High-sticking	01:46	2:00
1st	CHI	Eric Nesterenko	Roughing	07:08	2:00
1st	TOR	Carl Brewer	Roughing	07:08	2:00
1st	CHI	Kenny Wharram	Tripping	17:37	2:00
2nd	TOR	Frank Mahovlich	Charging	00:29	2:00
2nd	TOR	Allan Stanley	Charging	05:21	2:00
2nd	TOR	Bob Pulford	Misconduct	07:31	10:00
2nd	CHI	Reg Fleming	Roughing	10:53	2:00
2nd	TOR	Ron Stewart	Roughing	10:53	2:00
2nd	CHI	Dollard St. Laurent	Holding	12:42	2:00
3rd	TOR	Carl Brewer	Holding	00:33	2:00
3rd	CHI	Murray Balfour	Roughing	08:54	2:00
3rd	TOR	Eddie Shack	Roughing	08:54	2:00
3rd	CHI	Reg Fleming	Roughing	14:30	2:00
3rd	TOR	Tim Horton	Roughing	14:30	2:00
3rd	CHI	Reg Fleming	Cross-checking	17:24	2:00
3rd	CHI	Stan Mikita	Slashing – major	17:24	5:00
3rd	CHI	Stan Mikita	Game misconduct	17:24	10:00
3rd	TOR	Frank Mahovlich	Slashing – major	17:24	5:00
3rd	TOR	Frank Mahovlich	Game misconduct	17:24	10:00
3rd	CHI	Jack Evans	Hooking	19:31	2:00

Shots by period
Team	1	2	3	Total
Toronto	10	7	14	31
Chicago	15	13	5	33

=== Game five ===
April 19	Chicago Black Hawks	4–8	Toronto Maple Leafs	Maple Leaf Gardens	Recap

With Johnny Bower being injured in game four, Don Simmons would have to take his place in net for Toronto. In game five, Bobby Hull recorded three points and Ab McDonald scored twice for Chicago. However, the Maple Leafs would emerge victorious, with Bob Pulford recording a hat trick, and Frank Mahovlich recording 4 points in an 8–4 victory to take a 3–2 lead in the series.

Scoring summary
Period	Team	Goal	Assist(s)	Time	Score
1st	TOR	Bob Pulford (5)	Bob Nevin (4) and Bert Olmstead (1)	00:17	1–0 TOR
1st	TOR	Bob Pulford (6)	Unassisted	17:45	2–0 TOR
1st	CHI	Murray Balfour (1)	Bill Hay (4) and Bobby Hull (4)	18:05	2–1 TOR
2nd	CHI	Ab McDonald (5)	Stan Mikita (14) and Bobby Hull (5)	00:59	2–2
2nd	CHI	Ab McDonald (6) – pp	Bobby Hull (6) and Stan Mikita (15)	03:07	3–2 CHI
2nd	TOR	Billy Harris (2)	Frank Mahovlich (4) and Tim Horton (10)	08:31	3–3
2nd	TOR	Dave Keon (5) – pp	Tim Horton (11) and Frank Mahovlich (4)	09:50	4–3 TOR
2nd	TOR	Frank Mahovlich (5)	Red Kelly (6) and Ron Stewart (5)	18:05	5–3 TOR
3rd	TOR	George Armstrong (7)	Carl Brewer (2) and Bobby Baun (1)	04:41	6–3 TOR
3rd	TOR	Frank Mahovlich (6)	Ron Stewart (6) and Bobby Baun (2)	06:31	7–3 TOR
3rd	CHI	Bob Turner (2) – sh	Dollard St. Laurent (4) and Eric Nesterenko (5)	10:31	7–4 TOR
3rd	TOR	Bob Pulford (7) – pp	Tim Horton (11) and Frank Mahovlich (4)	13:51	8–4 TOR
Penalty summary
Period	Team	Player	Penalty	Time	PIM
1st	TOR	Bob Nevin	Boarding	00:31	2:00
1st	TOR	Eddie Shack	Cross-checking	03:47	2:00
1st	CHI	Bill Hay	High-sticking	05:44	2:00
1st	TOR	Carl Brewer	Tripping	08:12	2:00
1st	TOR	Jack Evans	Holding	10:56	2:00
2nd	TOR	Dick Duff	Charging	01:53	2:00
2nd	CHI	Reg Fleming	Cross-checking	08:11	2:00
2nd	TOR	Eddie Shack	High-sticking	08:11	2:00
2nd	CHI	Kenny Wharram	Holding	08:51	2:00
2nd	CHI	Dollard St. Laurent	Tripping	15:15	2:00
2nd	CHI	Reg Fleming	Roughing	16:39	2:00
2nd	TOR	Bob Pulford	Roughing	16:39	2:00
3rd	TOR	Bobby Baun	Cross-checking	01:10	2:00
3rd	CHI	Reg Fleming	High-sticking	10:12	2:00
3rd	CHI	Pierre Pilote	Cross-checking	12:43	2:00
3rd	CHI	Bronco Horvath	Tripping	14:07	2:00

Shots by period
Team	1	2	3	Total
Chicago	13	11	6	31
Toronto	10	15	19	44

=== Game six ===
April 22	Toronto Maple Leafs	2–1	Chicago Black Hawks	Chicago Stadium	Recap

Game six remained scoreless until Bobby Hull gave the Black Hawks the game's first lead in the third period. One minute and thirty-three seconds later, Bob Nevin would score to tie the game again. Dick Duff scored a power-play goal with 5:46 remaining whilst the Maple Leafs would win their first Stanley Cup in 11 years.

Scoring summary
Period	Team	Goal	Assist(s)	Time	Score
1st	None				
2nd	None				
3rd	CHI	Bobby Hull (8)	Murray Balfour (1) and Bill Hay (7)	08:56	1–0 CHI
3rd	TOR	Bob Nevin (2)	Bobby Baun (3) and Frank Mahovlich (6)	10:29	1–1
3rd	TOR	Dick Duff (3) – pp	Tim Horton (13) and George Armstrong (5)	14:14	2–1 CHI
Penalty summary
Period	Team	Player	Penalty	Time	PIM
1st	CHI	Jack Evans	Holding	02:57	2:00
1st	CHI	Bobby Hull	Boarding	06:08	2:00
1st	TOR	Bob Pulford	High-sticking	12:09	2:00
2nd	CHI	Reg Fleming	Tripping	05:19	2:00
2nd	CHI	Eric Nesterenko	High-sticking	07:42	2:00
2nd	TOR	Bobby Baun	Holding	11:46	2:00
2nd	CHI	Dollard St. Laurent	Holding	18:07	2:00
3rd	TOR	Tim Horton	Tripping	04:30	2:00
3rd	CHI	Eric Nesterenko	Hooking	13:27	2:00
3rd	TOR	Tim Horton	Tripping	19:02	2:00

Shots by period
Team	1	2	3	Total
Toronto	13	14	10	37
Chicago	4	8	9	21

== Stanley Cup engraving ==
The 1962 Stanley Cup was presented to Maple Leafs captain George Armstrong by NHL President Clarence Campbell following the Maple Leafs 2–1 win over the Black Hawks in game six.

The following Maple Leafs players and staff had their names engraved on the Stanley Cup

1961–62 Toronto Maple Leafs

=== Players ===
Centres

- 4 Leonard Red Kelly
- 14 Dave Keon
- 15 Billy Harris

Wingers

- 8 John MacMillan
- 9 Dick Duff (A)
- 10 George Armstrong (Captain)
- 11 Bob Nevin
- 12 Ron Stewart
- 16 Bert Olmstead (A)
- 20 Bob Pulford
- 23 Eddie Shack
- 25 Ed Litzenberger
- 27 Frank Mahovlich

Defencemen

- 2 Carl Brewer
- 3 Al Arbour
- 7 Miles Tim Horton
- 21 Bob Baun
- 22 Larry Hillman*
- 26 Allan Stanley

Goaltenders

- 1 Johnny Bower
- 1-30 Don Simmons

=== Coaching and administrative staff ===
- Stafford Smythe (President/Owner), Conn Smythe (Chairman)
- Harold Ballard (Exe Vice President/Owner), John W. H. Bassett (Vice President/Owner)
- George Punch Imlach (Manager-Coach), Frank King Clancy (Asst. Manager-Coach)
- Bob Davidson (Chief Scout), Bob Haggart (Trainer)
- Tom Nayler (Asst. Trainer), Hugh Holton (Asst. Trainer)

=== Stanley Cup engraving ===
- * Larry Hillman played only 3 regular-season games, and spent most of the year in the minors. His name was still engraved on the Stanley Cup.
- Harold Ballard won his first of 4 Stanley Cups as (Vice President/Owner). Ballard would later become the fifth person to get on his name on Stanley Cup & Grey Cup. In 1986 Ballard was President/Owner of the Hamilton Tiger-Cats when they won the Grey Cup. (See Joe Miller, Lionel Conacher, Carl Voss, Leo Dandurand, Norman Kwong & Wayne Gretzky other persons who won both the Grey Cup and Stanley Cup.)
- Dr. Karl Elieff (Physiotherapist), Dr. Jame Murphy, Dr. Hugh Smythe (Team Doctors) - left off

== See also ==
- 1961–62 NHL season

== Notes ==
Preceded by Chicago Black Hawks; 1961	Toronto Maple Leafs; Stanley Cup champions 1962	Succeeded by Toronto Maple Leafs; 1963
