= 1961 Stanley Cup Final =

1961 ice hockey championship series

	1	2	3	4	5	6	Total
Chicago Black Hawks	3	1	3	1	6	5	4
Detroit Red Wings	2	3	1	2	3	1	2
- Location(s): Chicago: Chicago Stadium (1, 3, 5); Detroit: Olympia Stadium (2, 4, 6)
- Coaches: Chicago: Rudy Pilous; Detroit: Sid Abel
- Captains: Chicago: Ed Litzenberger; Detroit: Gordie Howe
- Dates: April 6–16, 1961
- Series-winning goal: Ab McDonald (18:49, second)
- Hall of Famers: Black Hawks: Al Arbour (1996, builder); Glenn Hall (1975); Bill Hay (2015, builder); Bobby Hull (1983); Stan Mikita (1983); Pierre Pilote (1975); Red Wings: Alex Delvecchio (1977); Gordie Howe (1972); Marcel Pronovost (1978); Terry Sawchuk (1971); Norm Ullman (1982); Coaches: Sid Abel (1969, player); Rudy Pilous (1985); Officials: Neil Armstrong (1991); George Hayes (1988); Matt Pavelich (1987); Frank Udvari (1973)

The 1961 Stanley Cup Final was the championship series of the National Hockey League's (NHL) 1960–61 season, and the culmination of the 1961 Stanley Cup playoffs. It was contested between the Detroit Red Wings and the Chicago Black Hawks. Chicago was making its first Finals appearance since 1944, and Detroit its first appearance since 1956; both had lost to the Montreal Canadiens in those previous appearances. The Black Hawks won the best-of-seven series, four games to two, to win their third Stanley Cup, their first since 1938. This was the last time Chicago won the Cup until 2010, a 49-year drought.

This was the only title not won by the Canadiens, Red Wings or Toronto Maple Leafs during the Original Six era, and the only title won by a U.S. team between 1955 and 1970.

== Paths to the Finals ==
Detroit defeated Toronto in five games and Chicago upset Montreal, the record five-time defending champion, in six, setting up the first all-American-team Finals since 1950, when the Wings beat the New York Rangers in a seven-game series.

== Game summaries ==
This was the only Stanley Cup championship in the 1960s not to be won by either the Toronto Maple Leafs or the Montreal Canadiens or feature either team.

=== Game one ===
April 6	Detroit Red Wings	2–3	Chicago Black Hawks	Chicago Stadium	Recap

Bobby Hull scored two goals in game one, giving the Black Hawks a 3–2 victory and a 1–0 lead in the series.

Scoring summary
Period	Team	Goal	Assist(s)	Time	Score
1st	CHI	Bobby Hull (3) – pp	Stan Mikita (2) and Murray Balfour (3)	09:39	1–0 CHI
1st	CHI	Kenny Wharram (2)	Ab McDonald (2) and Stan Mikita (3)	10:10	2–0 CHI
1st	CHI	Bobby Hull (4)	Pierre Pilote (7) and Murray Balfour (4)	13:15	3–0 CHI
2nd	DET	Len Lunde (2) – pp	Gordie Howe (5)	16:14	3–1 CHI
3rd	DET	Al Johnson (2)	Gordie Howe (6) and Norm Ullman (3)	19:18	3–2 CHI
Penalty summary
Period	Team	Player	Penalty	Time	PIM
1st	DET	Howie Young	Holding	07:54	2:00
2nd	DET	Howie Young	Cross-checking	03:13	2:00
2nd	CHI	Jack Evans	Tripping	09:27	2:00
2nd	CHI	Reg Fleming	Boarding	09:55	2:00
2nd	DET	Warren Godfrey	Interference	13:28	2:00
2nd	CHI	Bill Hay	Holding	15:42	2:00
2nd	DET	Vic Stasiuk	High-sticking	17:29	2:00
3rd	CHI	Pierre Pilote	Tripping	01:14	2:00
3rd	DET	Warren Godfrey	Holding	11:53	2:00
3rd	DET	Pete Goegan	Misconduct	14:03	10:00
3rd	CHI	Bill Hay	Holding	16:08	2:00
3rd	DET	Howie Young	Slashing	16:08	2:00

Shots by period
Team	1	2	3	Total
Detroit	8	14	14	36
Chicago	10	13	8	31

=== Game two ===
April 8	Detroit Red Wings	3–1	Chicago Black Hawks	Detroit Olympia	Recap

With Terry Sawchuk being pulled in the first period of game one, Hank Bassen started the second game and provided the Red Wings with a win, making 26 saves in the victory. Alex Delvecchio also recorded two goals and an assist, and the Red Wings tied the series.

Scoring summary
Period	Team	Goal	Assist(s)	Time	Score
1st	DET	Howie Young (2)	Vic Stasiuk (4) and Alex Delvecchio (3)	08:10	1–0 DET
1st	DET	Alex Delvecchio (2) – pp	Gordie Howe (7) and Al Johnson (1)	17:39	2–0 DET
2nd	CHI	Pierre Pilote (2)	Unassisted	00:41	2–1 DET
3rd	DET	Alex Delvecchio (3) – en	Vic Stasiuk (5) and Gordie Howe (8)	19:22	3–1 DET
Penalty summary
Period	Team	Player	Penalty	Time	PIM
1st	DET	Gerry Odrowski	Tripping	00:33	2:00
1st	CHI	Kenny Wharram	Hooking	00:45	2:00
1st	DET	Vic Stasiuk	Holding	03:13	2:00
1st	DET	Howie Young	Elbowing	08:27	2:00
1st	CHI	Kenny Wharram	Tripping	12:15	2:00
1st	DET	Warren Godfrey	Kneeing	15:16	2:00
1st	CHI	Dollard St. Laurent	Kneeing	17:27	2:00
2nd	CHI	Jack Evans	Hooking	02:42	2:00
2nd	CHI	Jack Evans	Tripping	10:50	2:00
2nd	DET	Howie Young	Slashing	15:31	2:00
2nd	CHI	Jack Evans	Charging	20:00	2:00
3rd	CHI	Bill Hay	Roughing	04:55	2:00
3rd	DET	Howie Young	Roughing	04:55	2:00
3rd	DET	Gordie Howe	Holding	13:19	2:00
3rd	CHI	Tod Sloan	Tripping	19:33	2:00

Shots by period
Team	1	2	3	Total
Detroit	9	12	17	38
Chicago	2	13	12	27

=== Game three ===
April 10	Detroit Red Wings	1–3	Chicago Black Hawks	Chicago Stadium	Recap

Glenn Hall was solid in game three for Chicago, making 35 saves in a 3–1 victory to take a 2–1 lead in the series.

Scoring summary
Period	Team	Goal	Assist(s)	Time	Score
1st	None				
2nd	CHI	Stan Mikita (4)	Bobby Hull (6) and Pierre Pilote (8)	11:54	1–0 CHI
2nd	CHI	Ron Murphy (1)	Ed Litzenberger (3) and Pierre Pilote (9)	14:19	2–0 CHI
2nd	CHI	Murray Balfour (3)	Bobby Hull (7) and Bill Hay (3)	18:16	3–0 CHI
3rd	CHI	Gordie Howe (4)	Alex Delvecchio (4) and Howie Young (2)	09:28	3–1 CHI
Penalty summary
Period	Team	Player	Penalty	Time	PIM
1st	DET	Warren Godfrey	Tripping	05:29	2:00
1st	CHI	Kenny Wharram	Charging	11:12	2:00
1st	CHI	Stan Mikita	High-sticking	19:09	2:00
2nd	None				
3rd	CHI	Murray Balfour	Roughing	00:08	2:00
3rd	DET	Gordie Howe	Roughing	00:08	2:00
3rd	CHI	Kenny Wharram	Hooking	02:02	2:00
3rd	DET	Warren Godfrey	Hooking	02:02	2:00
3rd	DET	Howie Young	Tripping	05:33	2:00

Shots by period
Team	1	2	3	Total
Detroit	14	14	8	36
Chicago	11	14	11	36

=== Game four ===
April 12	Chicago Black Hawks	1–2	Detroit Red Wings	Detroit Olympia	Recap

Terry Sawchuk started game four for Detroit and made 26 saves, while Bruce MacGregor scored the game-winning goal in the third period to help Detroit tie the series.

Scoring summary
Period	Team	Goal	Assist(s)	Time	Score
1st	None				
2nd	CHI	Bill Hay (2)	Bobby Hull (8) and Murray Balfour (5)	07:34	1–0 CHI
2nd	DET	Alex Delvecchio (4) – pp	Bruce MacGregor (1) and Gordie Howe (9)	08:48	1–1
3rd	DET	Bruce MacGregor (1)	Val Fonteyne (2) and Warren Godfrey (2)	13:10	2–1 DET
Penalty summary
Period	Team	Player	Penalty	Time	PIM
1st	CHI	Murray Balfour	Holding	07:12	2:00
1st	DET	Bruce MacGregor	Tripping	12:22	2:00
1st	CHI	Eric Nesterenko	Cross-checking	15:39	2:00
2nd	CHI	Bobby Hull	High-sticking	08:12	2:00
2nd	DET	Norm Ullman	Holding	17:17	2:00
3rd	None				

Shots by period
Team	1	2	3	Total
Chicago	6	11	10	27
Detroit	14	10	6	30

=== Game five ===
April 14	Detroit Red Wings	3–6	Chicago Black Hawks	Chicago Stadium	Recap

In a back and forth game five, Murray Balfour and Stan Mikita each scored twice for Chicago to give them a 6–3 victory and a 3–2 series lead.

Scoring summary
Period	Team	Goal	Assist(s)	Time	Score
1st	DET	Leo Labine (3)	Al Johnson (2) and Norm Ullman (4)	02:14	1–0 DET
1st	CHI	Murray Balfour (3)	Bobby Hull (7) and Bill Hay (3)	09:36	1–1
1st	CHI	Ron Murphy (2)	Dollard St. Laurent (2) and Eric Nesterenko (3)	10:14	2–1 CHI
1st	DET	Howie Glover (1) – pp	Bruce MacGregor (2) and Val Fonteyne (3)	15:35	2–2
2nd	CHI	Murray Balfour (5)	Pierre Pilote (10) and Bill Hay (5)	16:25	3–2 CHI
2nd	DET	Vic Stasiuk (2)	Gordie Howe (10) and Marcel Pronovost (3)	18:49	3–3
3rd	CHI	Stan Mikita (5) – pp	Pierre Pilote (11) and Elmer Vasko (1)	02:51	4–3 CHI
3rd	CHI	Pierre Pilote (3)	Kenny Wharram (5) and Stan Mikita (4)	07:02	5–3 CHI
3rd	CHI	Stan Mikita (6)	Ron Murphy (1)	13:27	6–3 CHI
Penalty summary
Period	Team	Player	Penalty	Time	PIM
1st	CHI	Elmer Vasko	Tripping	13:44	2:00
2nd	DET	Howie Young	Boarding	06:20	2:00
2nd	CHI	Kenny Wharram	Tripping	12:29	2:00
2nd	CHI	Bill Hay	Roughing	19:13	2:00
2nd	DET	Pete Goegan	Roughing	19:13	2:00
3rd	DET	Howie Young	Tripping	02:22	2:00
3rd	CHI	Elmer Vasko	Tripping	04:17	2:00
3rd	DET	Gerry Odrowski	Tripping	08:15	2:00
3rd	CHI	Elmer Vasko	Boarding	16:27	2:00
3rd	DET	Gordie Howe	Holding	18:18	2:00

Shots by period
Team	1	2	3	Total
Detroit	14	11	11	36
Chicago	8	12	24	44

=== Game six ===
April 16	Chicago Black Hawks	5–1	Detroit Red Wings	Detroit Olympia	Recap

In game six, the Black Hawks defeated the Red Wings by a score of 5–1 to win their first Stanley Cup in 23 years.

Scoring summary
Period	Team	Goal	Assist(s)	Time	Score
1st	DET	Parker MacDonald (1) – pp	Gordie Howe (11) and Alex Delvecchio (5)	15:24	1–0 DET
2nd	CHI	Reg Fleming (1) – sh	Unassisted	06:45	1–1
2nd	CHI	Ab McDonald (2)	Bobby Hull (10) and Stan Mikita (5)	18:49	2–1 CHI
3rd	CHI	Eric Nesterenko (2)	Tod Sloan (1) and Pierre Pilote (12)	00:57	3–1 CHI
3rd	CHI	Jack Evans (1)	Unassisted	06:27	4–1 CHI
3rd	CHI	Kenny Wharram (3)	Unassisted	18:00	5–1 CHI
Penalty summary
Period	Team	Player	Penalty	Time	PIM
1st	DET	Gordie Howe	Tripping	07:17	2:00
1st	CHI	Jack Evans	Interference	11:16	2:00
1st	CHI	Al Arbour	Interference	13:34	2:00
2nd	DET	Pete Goegan	Interference	01:24	2:00
2nd	CHI	Wayne Hicks	Hooking	06:05	2:00
2nd	CHI	Tod Sloan	Hooking	14:17	2:00
3rd	DET	Bruce MacGregor	Tripping	03:28	2:00
3rd	DET	Bruce MacGregor	Tripping	10:55	2:00
3rd	CHI	Tod Sloan	Tripping	18:23	2:00

Shots by period
Team	1	2	3	Total
Chicago	4	10	11	25
Detroit	8	8	6	22

== Stanley Cup engraving ==
The 1961 Stanley Cup was presented to Black Hawks captain Ed Litzenberger by NHL President Clarence Campbell following the Black Hawks 5–1 win over the Red Wings in game six.

The following Black Hawks players and staff had their names engraved on the Stanley Cup:

1960–61 Chicago Black Hawks

=== Players ===
Centres

- 9 Tod Sloan
- 11 Bill Hay
- 12 Ed Litzenberger (Captain)
- 17 Ken Wharram
- 21 Stan Mikita

Wingers

- 6 Reg Fleming
- 8 Murray Balfour
- 8 Wayne Hicks
- 10 Ron Murphy (A)
- 14 Alvin Ab McDonald
- 15 Eric Nesterenko
- 16 Bobby Hull
- 18 Ronald Chico Maki*
- 20 Earl Balfour

Defencemen

- 2 Al Arbour
- 3 Pierre Pilote (A)
- 4 Elmer Vasko
- 5 Jack Evans
- 18 Wayne Hillman
- 19 Dollard St. Laurent

Goaltenders

- 1 Glenn Hall
- 1 Denis DeJordy*
- Allan Roy Edwards*

* Did not play in the Finals.

=== Coaching and administrative staff ===
- Arthur Wirtz Sr. (President/Owner), Arthur Wirtz Jr. (Vice President/Owner)
- James D. Norris Jr. (Chairman/Owner), Tommy Ivan (Manager)
- Rudy Pilous (Coach), Nick Garen (Trainer)
- Walter Humeniuk (Asst. Trainer)
- Michael Wirtz (Vice President) - left off the Stanley Cup.

=== Stanley Cup engraving ===
- Roy Edwards was engraved as Allan R. Edwards. He never played in any games for Chicago; his first NHL game was during the 1967–68 season with Detroit. Denis DeJordy's first NHL game was during the 1962–63 season.
- Ronald Chico Maki's name was included on the Stanley Cup for dressing for two games in the Finals, even though he did not get any ice time. Maki played his first regular-season NHL game during the 1961–62 season. He engraved as Robert Maki not Ronald Maki.
- Ron Murphy was engraved as Robert Murphy. He was engraved as R. Murphy in 1970 with Boston.
- Tod Sloan was engraved as Martin A. Sloan. He was engraved on the cup as Tod Sloan in 1951 with Toronto.

== See also ==
- 1960–61 NHL season

== Notes ==
Preceded by Montreal Canadiens; 1960	Chicago Black Hawks; Stanley Cup champions 1961	Succeeded by Toronto Maple Leafs; 1962
