= 14th National Hockey League All-Star Game =

Professional ice hockey exhibition game

14th NHL All-Star Game
	1	2	3	Total
All-Star Team	0	2	0	2
Montreal Canadiens	0	1	0	1
- Date: October 1, 1960
- Arena: Montreal Forum
- City: Montreal
- Attendance: 13,949

The 14th National Hockey League All-Star Game took place at the Montreal Forum on October 1, 1960, which saw the NHL all-stars defeat the hometown Montreal Canadiens 2–1.

== A Farewell to the Rocket ==
The 14th game was the first all-star game that did not have Maurice "Rocket" Richard in the lineup, as he had retired after winning the Stanley Cup a year ago. The pre-game events both honored the all-stars, as was the norm, but was also a celebration of the Rocket's career. Among the gifts the Rocket received was an alarm clock, which would continually sound unchecked, due to Richard's inability to turn the alarm off.

Replacing the Rocket in the Habs' lineup was Bill Hicke, who played alongside Richard's old linemates, Dickie Moore and younger brother Henri Richard. Other no-shows in this all-star game was Ab McDonald, who was traded to the Chicago Black Hawks, as well as Dean Prentice and Phil Goyette, who were both out with an injury.

== All-Star uniforms ==
Since 1947, the All-Star uniforms had been red, white, and blue. However, after thirteen years, the NHL decided to change the uniform for this game, and utilize the NHL's official colors of black and orange. The colors had previously been used by the NHL All-Stars in the Ace Bailey Benefit Game and the Babe Siebert Memorial Game, before the All-Star Game had become a regularly scheduled event.

The new All-Star uniforms were a marked departure from any previous designs used in the NHL. The white uniforms featured black and orange stripes originating from the collar on the front and back side of the jersey, descending down the sleeves, and meeting at the elbows. An additional inner set of stripes formed a loop from the shoulder seam to above the elbows. Two orange stars outlined in black adorned the upper chest of the uniform, with a third star on the upper back. The numbers were black, with orange and black outlines.

These uniforms would continue to be used through the 1963 All-Star Game.

== Game summary ==
	Montreal Canadiens	All-Stars
Final score	1	2
Head coach	Toe Blake	Punch Imlach (Toronto Maple Leafs)
Lineup	1 - G Jacques Plante; 2 - D Doug Harvey (Captain); 4 - C Jean Beliveau; 5 - RW Bernie Geoffrion; 6 - C Ralph Backstrom; 8 - RW Bill Hicke; 10 - D Tom Johnson; 11 - D Bob Turner; 12 - RW Dickie Moore; 16 - C Henri Richard; 17 - D Jean-Guy Talbot; 18 - LW Marcel Bonin; 19 - D Al Langlois; 22 - LW Don Marshall; 23 - LW Andre Pronovost; 24 - RW Claude Provost	First team All-Stars: 1 - G Glenn Hall (Chicago Black Hawks); 3 - D Marcel Pronovost (Detroit Red Wings); 9 - RW Gordie Howe (Detroit Red Wings); 16 - LW Bobby Hull (Chicago Black Hawks); Second team All-Stars: 5 - D Pierre Pilote (Chicago Black Hawks); 6 - C Bronco Horvath (Boston Bruins); 18 - D Allan Stanley (Toronto Maple Leafs); Other players: 2 - D Bob Armstrong (Boston Bruins); 4 - D Red Kelly (Toronto Maple Leafs); 7 - LW Vic Stasiuk (Boston Bruins); 8 - C Norm Ullman (Detroit Red Wings); 10 - RW Andy Bathgate (New York Rangers); 11 - C Bill Hay (Chicago Black Hawks); 12 - RW Andy Hebenton (New York Rangers); 14 - D Bill Gadsby (New York Rangers); 15 - C Red Sullivan (New York Rangers); 17 - C Don McKenney (Boston Bruins); 19 - LW Frank Mahovlich (Toronto Maple Leafs); 20 - LW Bob Pulford (Toronto Maple Leafs)
Scoring summary	Provost (Backstrom, Pronovost) 11:40 second	Mahovlich (Pilote, Kelly) 0:40 second; Hebenton (Sullivan) 15:15 second (short-handed)
Penalties	Talbot 7:22 second; Johnson 17:03 second; Hicke 2:58 third; Harvey 10:20 third	Sullivan 12:17 second; Hull 14:47 second; Gadsby 5:44 third; Pilote 6:54 third
Win/loss	Jacques Plante	Glenn Hall

Shots on goal
Montreal	9	8	9	26
All-Stars	7	10	10	27

- Referee: Eddie Powers
- Linesmen: George Hayes, Neil Armstrong
- Attendance: 13,949

== See also ==
- 1960–61 NHL season
