= Pierre Pilote =

Canadian ice hockey player (1931–2017)

- Hockey Hall of Fame, 1975
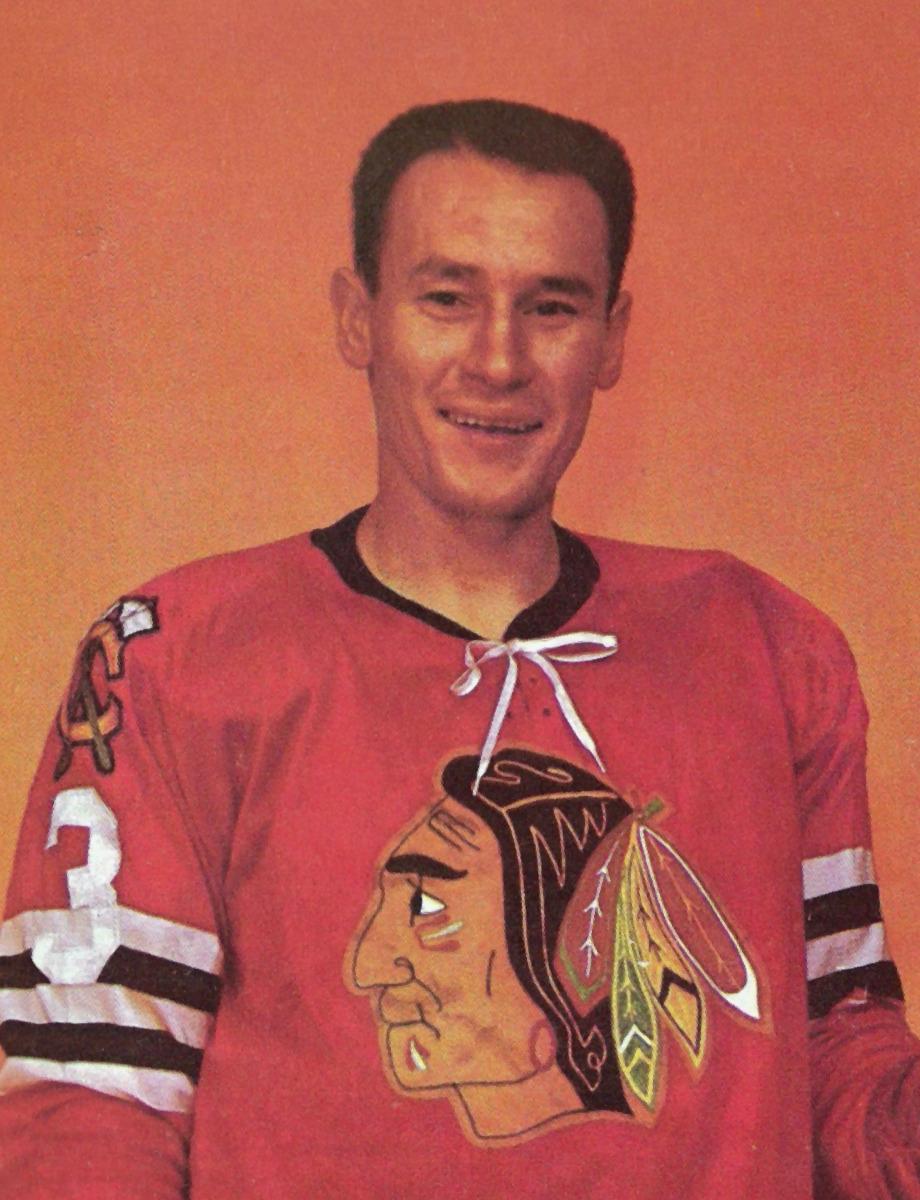
- Pilote with the Chicago Black Hawks, c. 1963
- Born: December 11, 1931 Kénogami, Quebec, Canada
- Died: September 9, 2017 (aged 85) Barrie, Ontario, Canada
- Height: 5 ft 10 in (178 cm)
- Weight: 178 lb (81 kg; 12 st 10 lb)
- Position: Defence
- Shot: Left
- Played for: Chicago Black Hawks; Toronto Maple Leafs
- Playing career: 1955–1969

Joseph Albert Pierre Paul Pilote (December 11, 1931 – September 9, 2017) was a Canadian professional ice hockey defenceman and perennial All-Star, most notably for the Chicago Black Hawks of the National Hockey League (NHL), for which he served as team captain for seven seasons. He won the James Norris Memorial Trophy three times for best defenceman in the NHL.

== Early life ==
Born in Kenogami, Quebec, Pilote's family moved to Fort Erie, Ontario, when he was 14 years old. Because the local rink collapsed in a storm, Pilote did not play his first organized hockey game until he was 17. He tried out with a Niagara Falls junior B team as a centre, but was turned down because the club needed a defenceman instead. Pilote practiced as a defenceman and joined the team the following season.

Rudy Pilous recruited Pilote to the St. Catharines Teepees of the Ontario Hockey Association (OHA); he made the team out of training camp in 1950. Pilote played four full seasons for the minor professional club the Buffalo Bisons of the American Hockey League (AHL). During his fifth season, he was signed by the Chicago Black Hawks of the National Hockey League (NHL), starting his professional career.

== NHL defenceman ==
Pilote became a preeminent star for the Black Hawks, winning the James Norris Memorial Trophy as the NHL's most outstanding defenceman three straight seasons in 1963, 1964 and 1965 — a feat matched or surpassed only by Doug Harvey, Bobby Orr and Nicklas Lidström in NHL history — as well as runner-up in 1962, 1966 and 1967. He was on the First or second All-Star team every year from 1960 to 1967. Pilote had an iron man streak of playing 376 consecutive games over more than five seasons. He was often paired with Elmer "Moose" Vasko on the Chicago blue line.

In 1961, the Black Hawks won the Stanley Cup. During the off-season, team captain Ed Litzenberger was traded and Pilote was named the new captain. He held this role with the team until traded to the Toronto Maple Leafs in 1968 for forward Jim Pappin; his seven-season tenure as captain was, until surpassed by Jonathan Toews in the 2016–17 NHL season, the longest in franchise history.

Pilote was traded to the Toronto Maple Leafs on May 23, 1968, for Jim Pappin and played one season with the team before retiring. He played his last game on April 6, 1969, finishing his career with 80 goals and 418 assists in 890 games.

== Post-NHL career ==
At the time of his retirement, Pilote was the second leading defence scorer in NHL history (behind Harvey), as well as the sixth leading career scorer for the Black Hawks and second in all-time assists behind Stan Mikita. He remains ninth in all-time assists for the Hawks.

Pilote was inducted in the Hockey Hall of Fame in 1975. In 1997, he was ranked number 59 on The Hockey News' list of the 100 greatest hockey players.

On July 18, 2008, the Blackhawks announced that the #3 jersey worn by Pilote and Keith Magnuson would be retired in a joint ceremony, the sixth number so honoured by the club. The ceremony was held on November 12, 2008, before the Blackhawks' game against the Boston Bruins at the United Center. In January 2012, Pilote was honoured with a bronze statue in front of the Jonquière Sports Palace. In the fall of 2013, ECW Press published his biography Heart of the Blackhawks: The Pierre Pilote Story, co-written with L. "Waxy" Gregoire and David M. Dupuis. Pilote died of cancer on September 9, 2017.

== Career statistics ==
			Regular season					Playoffs
Season	Team	League	GP	G	A	Pts	PIM	GP	G	A	Pts	PIM
1950–51	St. Catharines Teepees	OHA-Jr.	54	13	13	26	230	9	2	2	4	23
1951–52	St. Catharines Teepees	OHA-Jr.	52	21	32	53	139	14	3	12	15	50
1951–52	Buffalo Bisons	AHL	2	0	1	1	4	—	—	—	—	—
1952–53	Buffalo Bisons	AHL	61	2	14	16	85	—	—	—	—	—
1953–54	Buffalo Bisons	AHL	67	2	28	30	108	3	0	0	0	6
1954–55	Buffalo Bisons	AHL	63	10	28	38	120	10	0	4	4	18
1955–56	Chicago Black Hawks	NHL	20	3	5	8	34	—	—	—	—	—
1955–56	Buffalo Bisons	AHL	43	0	11	11	118	5	0	2	2	4
1956–57	Chicago Black Hawks	NHL	70	3	14	17	117	—	—	—	—	—
1957–58	Chicago Black Hawks	NHL	70	6	24	30	91	—	—	—	—	—
1958–59	Chicago Black Hawks	NHL	70	7	30	37	79	6	0	2	2	10
1959–60	Chicago Black Hawks	NHL	70	7	38	45	100	4	0	1	1	8
1960–61	Chicago Black Hawks	NHL	70	6	29	35	165	12	3	12	15	8
1961–62	Chicago Black Hawks	NHL	59	7	35	42	97	12	0	7	7	8
1962–63	Chicago Black Hawks	NHL	59	8	18	26	57	6	0	8	8	8
1963–64	Chicago Black Hawks	NHL	70	7	46	53	84	7	2	6	8	6
1964–65	Chicago Black Hawks	NHL	68	14	45	59	162	12	0	7	7	22
1965–66	Chicago Black Hawks	NHL	51	2	34	36	60	6	0	2	2	10
1966–67	Chicago Black Hawks	NHL	70	6	46	52	90	6	2	4	6	6
1967–68	Chicago Black Hawks	NHL	74	1	36	37	69	11	1	3	4	12
1968–69	Toronto Maple Leafs	NHL	69	3	18	21	46	4	0	1	1	4
NHL totals			890	80	418	498	1,251	86	8	53	61	102

== Awards and honours ==
Award	Year
NHL
NHL All-Star Game	1960, 1961, 1962, 1963, 1964, 1965, 1967, 1968
NHL Second All-Star Team	1960, 1961, 1962
Stanley Cup Champion	1961
James Norris Memorial Trophy	1963, 1964, 1965
NHL First All-Star Team	1963, 1964, 1965, 1966, 1967

Preceded by Ed Litzenberger	Chicago Black Hawks captain 1961–68	Succeeded by Pat Stapleton
Preceded by Doug Harvey	Winner of the Norris Trophy; 1963, 1964, 1965	Succeeded by Jacques Laperrière
