= Murray Balfour =

Canadian ice hockey player (1936–1965)

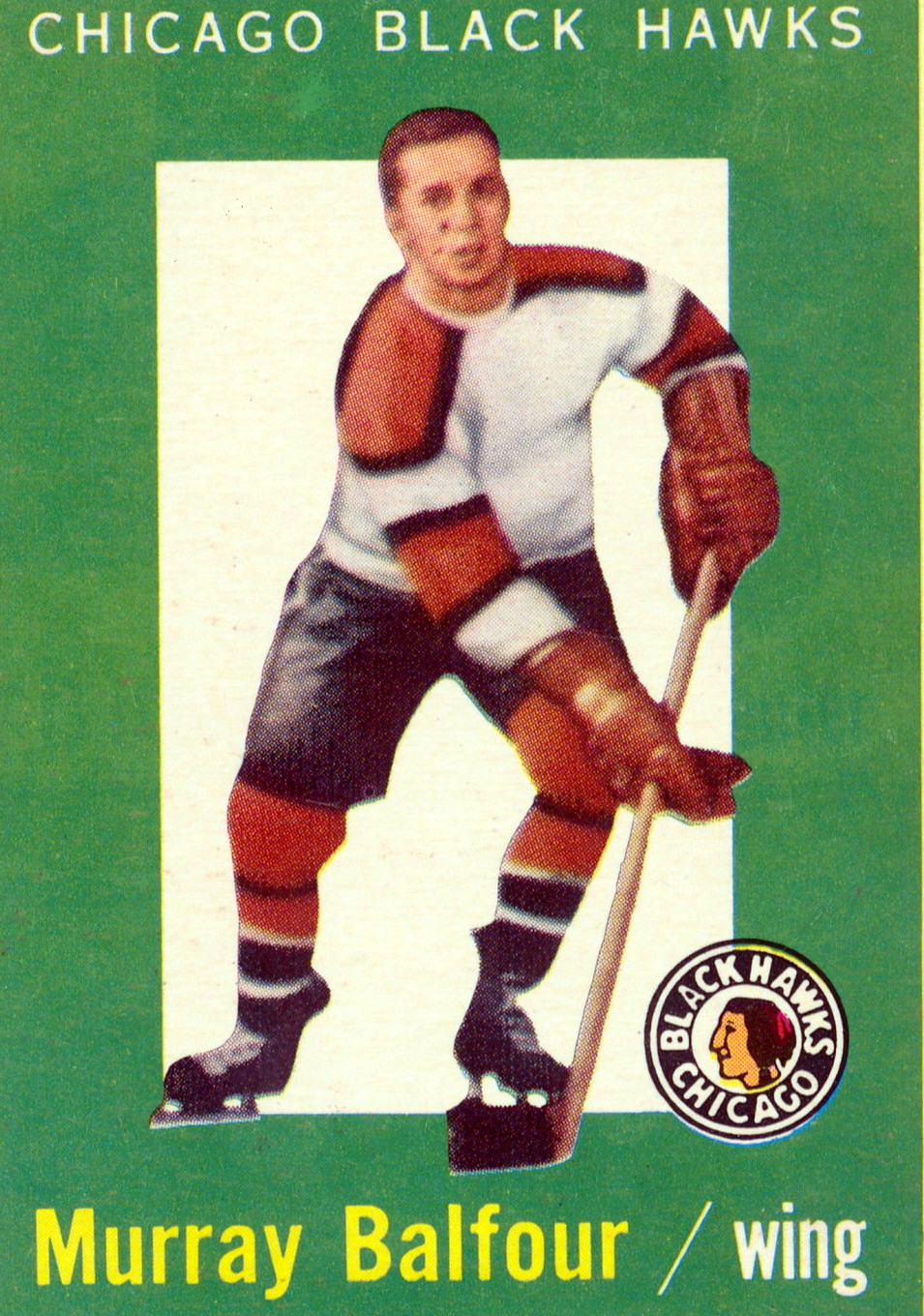
- Born: August 24, 1936 Regina, Saskatchewan, Canada
- Died: May 30, 1965 (aged 28) Regina, Saskatchewan, Canada
- Height: 5 ft 9 in (175 cm)
- Weight: 180 lb (82 kg; 12 st 12 lb)
- Position: Right wing
- Shot: Right
- Played for: Montreal Canadiens; Boston Bruins; Chicago Black Hawks
- Playing career: 1956–1965

Murray Gordon Louis Balfour (August 24, 1936 – May 30, 1965) was a Canadian ice hockey right wing in the National Hockey League from 1956 to 1965, with the Montreal Canadiens, Chicago Black Hawks, and Boston Bruins. Balfour won the Stanley Cup in 1961 with Chicago. His career ended due to lung cancer, which led to his death in 1965.

== Playing career ==
Balfour first played in the National Hockey League with the Montreal Canadiens, playing five games with them over the 1956–57 and 1957–58 seasons, though mainly spent those years with their minor-league affiliates, the Hull-Ottawa Canadiens and Montreal Royals. A right wing, Balfour was unable to play for Montreal full-time as the team already had Maurice Richard, Bernie Geoffrion, and Claude Provost on the team (the first two later being elected to the Hockey Hall of Fame. After spending the 1958–59 season with the minor-league Rochester Americans, Balfour was sold to the Chicago Black Hawks for cash.

Balfour was a member of the renowned "Million Dollar Line" alongside Bobby Hull and Bill Hay with the Black Hawks. In game three of the first round of the 1961 Stanley Cup playoffs, he scored the game winner in triple overtime against the defending champion Canadiens. In the fifth game, Balfour crashed into the Detroit Red Wings net and broke his arm. The Hawks went on to win the Stanley Cup in six games with Balfour watching the final game from the hospital. He led Chicago in goals scored during the playoffs with 5. During the 1961–62 season Balfour re-injured his wrist, requiring surgery and an 8 inches (20 cm) steel rod implanted for support.

His play declined as a result of the injury, and he was traded to the Boston Bruins in 1964. He started the 1964–65 season with the Bruins, however he complained about being tired and began slowing down. As a result, Balfour was sent to their minor-league affiliate, the Hershey Bears. After 31 games with Hershey, Balforur stopped playing, and was treated for a lesion on his lung. On April 5 he had surgery, where an inoperable tumor was found.

He recorded 67 goals and 90 assists for a total of 157 points over his career, having played in 306 games.

== Personal life ==
After the tumor was found on Balfour's lung, he returned home to Regina, and entered a hospital on May 29. He died of lung cancer on May 30, 1965.

The City of Regina named a hockey arena in Balfour's honour.

Balfour's parents were Gordon and Margaret Balfour (nee Folk) of Regina.

== Career statistics ==
=== Regular season and playoffs ===
			Regular season					Playoffs
Season	Team	League	GP	G	A	Pts	PIM	GP	G	A	Pts	PIM
1952–53	Regina Pats	WJHL	31	2	4	6	38	7	0	1	1	10
1952–53	Regina Pats	Al-Cup	—	—	—	—	—	2	0	0	0	5
1953–54	Regina Pats	WJHL	35	7	5	12	99	16	4	4	8	45
1954–55	Regina Pats	WJHL	38	10	16	26	156	12	7	4	11	30
1954–55	Regina Pats	M-Cup	—	—	—	—	—	3	1	2	3	4
1955–56	Regina Pats	WJHL	34	24	18	42	104	10	7	5	12	20
1955–56	Regina Pats	M-Cup	—	—	—	—	—	19	15	4	19	65
1956–57	Hull-Ottawa Canadiens	OHA Sr	19	12	7	19	76	—	—	—	—	—
1956–57	Hull-Ottawa Canadiens	QHL	18	2	6	8	15	—	—	—	—	—
1956–57	Montreal Canadiens	NHL	2	0	0	0	2	—	—	—	—	—
1956–57	Hull-Ottawa Canadiens	M-Cup	—	—	—	—	—	15	5	12	17	35
1957–58	Montreal Canadiens	NHL	3	1	1	2	4	—	—	—	—	—
1957–58	Montreal Royals	QHL	62	23	25	48	107	7	1	2	3	20
1958–59	Rochester Americans	AHL	67	14	23	37	181	1	0	0	0	0
1959–60	Chicago Black Hawks	NHL	61	18	12	30	55	4	1	0	1	0
1960–61	Chicago Black Hawks	NHL	70	21	27	48	123	11	5	5	10	14
1961–62	Chicago Black Hawks	NHL	49	15	15	30	72	12	1	1	2	15
1962–63	Chicago Black Hawks	NHL	65	10	23	33	75	6	0	2	2	12
1963–64	Chicago Black Hawks	NHL	41	2	10	12	36	7	2	2	4	4
1964–65	Boston Bruins	NHL	15	0	2	2	26	—	—	—	—	—
1964–65	Hershey Bears	AHL	31	10	8	18	36	—	—	—	—	—
NHL totals			306	67	90	157	393	40	9	10	19	45

== See also ==
- List of ice hockey players who died during their playing career
