= James Norris Memorial Trophy =

NHL award

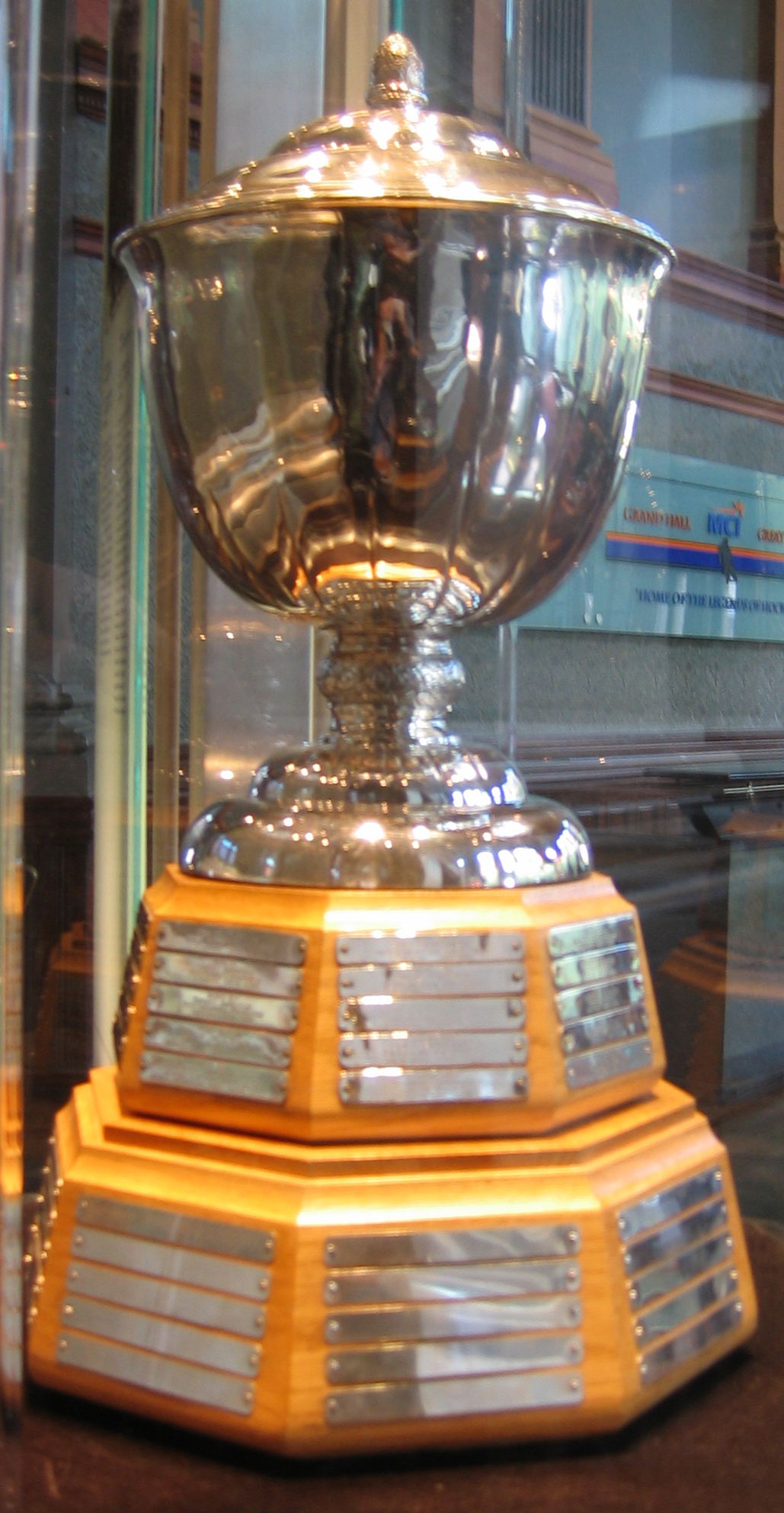
- Sport: Ice hockey
- Awarded for: "defense player who demonstrates throughout the season the greatest all-round ability in the position" in the National Hockey League

History
- First award: 1953–54 NHL season
- First winner: Red Kelly
- Most wins: Bobby Orr (8)
- Most recent: Zach Werenski; Columbus Blue Jackets

The James Norris Memorial Trophy, or simply the Norris Trophy, is awarded annually to the National Hockey League's top "defense player who demonstrates throughout the season the greatest all-round ability in the position". It is named after James E. Norris, the longtime owner of the Detroit Red Wings. The James Norris Memorial Trophy has been awarded 62 times to 26 players since its beginnings in 1953–54. At the end of each season, members of the Professional Hockey Writers' Association vote to determine the player who was the best defenseman during the regular season.

== History ==
The trophy is named in honour of James E. Norris, owner of the National Hockey League's Detroit Red Wings from 1932 to 1952. The trophy was first awarded at the conclusion of the 1953–54 NHL season.

Bobby Orr of the Boston Bruins won the award for a record eight consecutive seasons (1968–75). Doug Harvey and Nicklas Lidstrom won the award seven times, and Ray Bourque won it five times; Bourque was in the top three vote-getters for the trophy a further ten times. The Boston Bruins have had the most Norris Trophies winners with 14; the Montreal Canadiens have had the second most with 12.

Only two players have won both the Norris and Hart Memorial Trophy for the league Most Valuable Player in the same season: Bobby Orr, who won both trophies in the 1969–70, 1970–71 and 1971–72 seasons, and Chris Pronger, who won the Hart and Norris in the 1999–2000 NHL season. As of 2025, no defenseman has won the Hart Trophy without also winning the Norris Trophy since the latter was introduced.

Six defensemen won the Hart Trophy as the league's most valuable player before the Norris Trophy's establishment: Herb Gardiner, Eddie Shore (four times), Albert "Babe" Siebert, Ebbie Goodfellow, Tommy Anderson and Babe Pratt.

Save for Randy Carlyle and P. K. Subban, every Norris winner eligible to be inducted into the Hockey Hall of Fame has been.

Members of the Professional Hockey Writers' Association vote at the end of the regular season, and each individual voter ranks their top five candidates on a 10–7–5–3–1 point(s) system. Three finalists are named and the trophy is awarded at the NHL awards ceremony after the conclusion of the playoffs.

== Winners ==
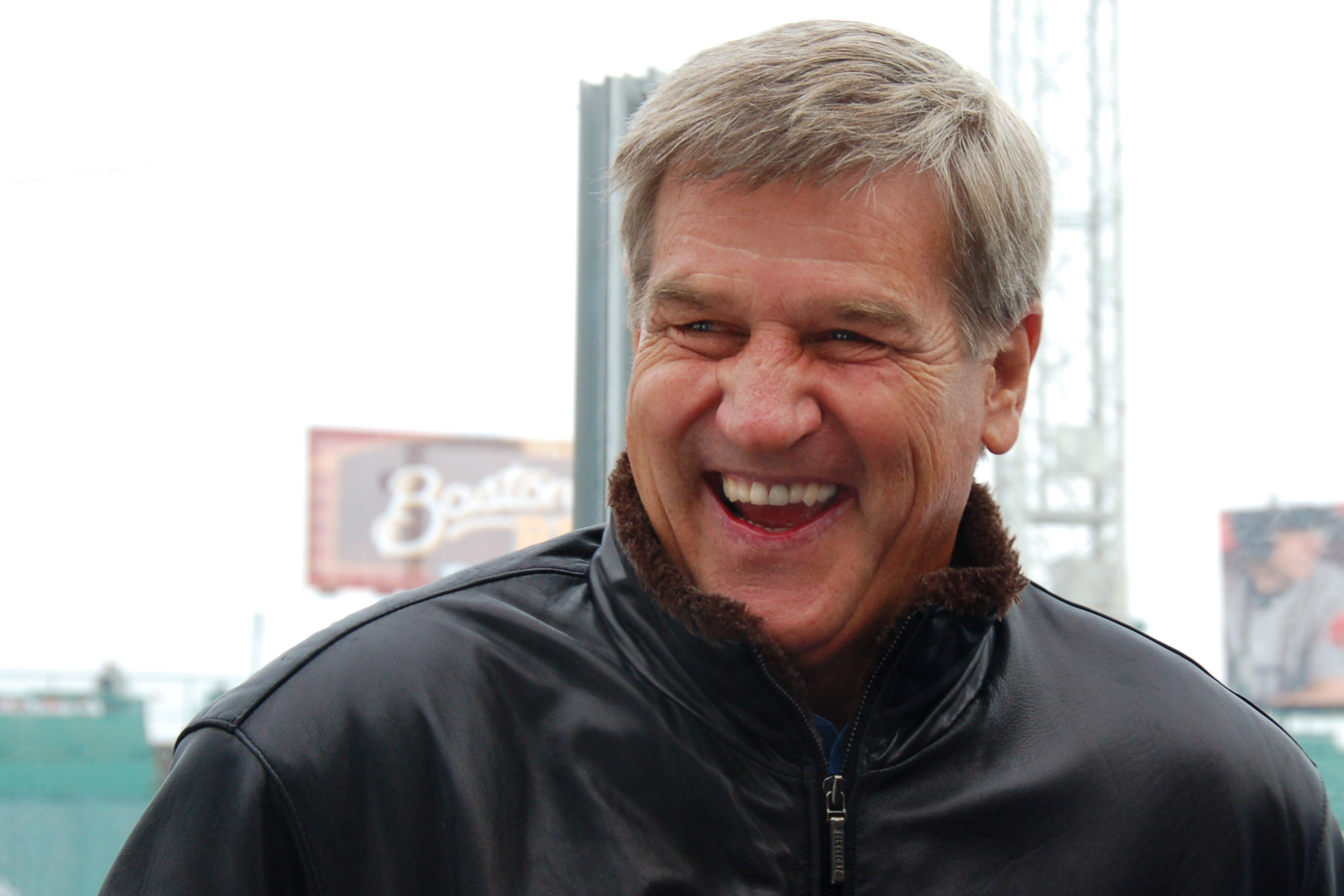
Bobby Orr, eight-time winner.

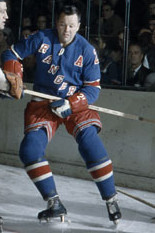
Doug Harvey, seven-time winner.

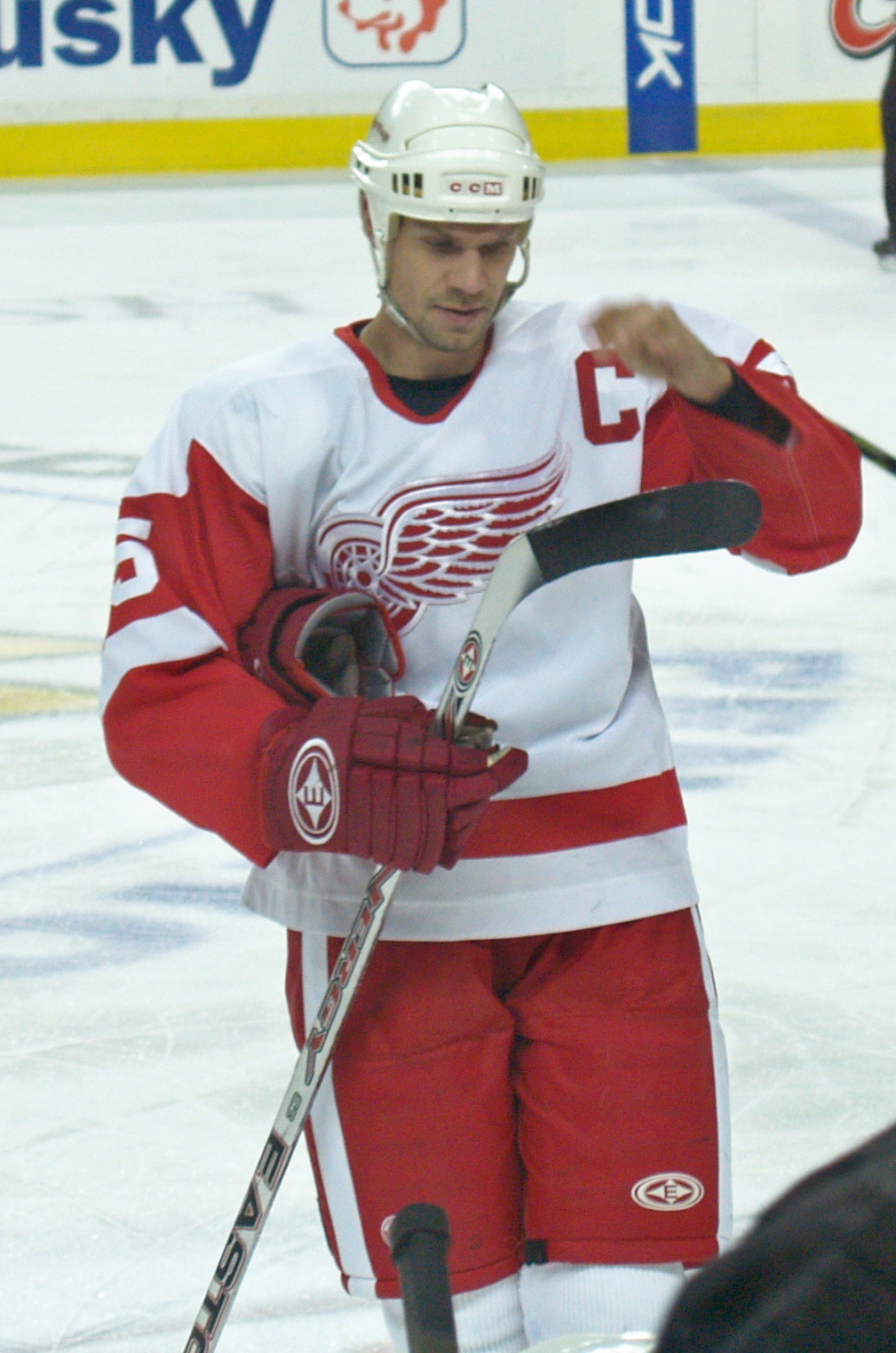
Nicklas Lidstrom, seven-time winner.

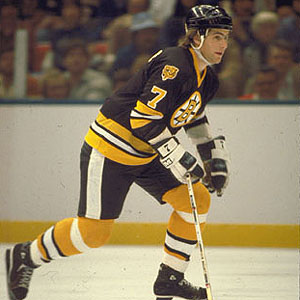
Ray Bourque, five-time winner.

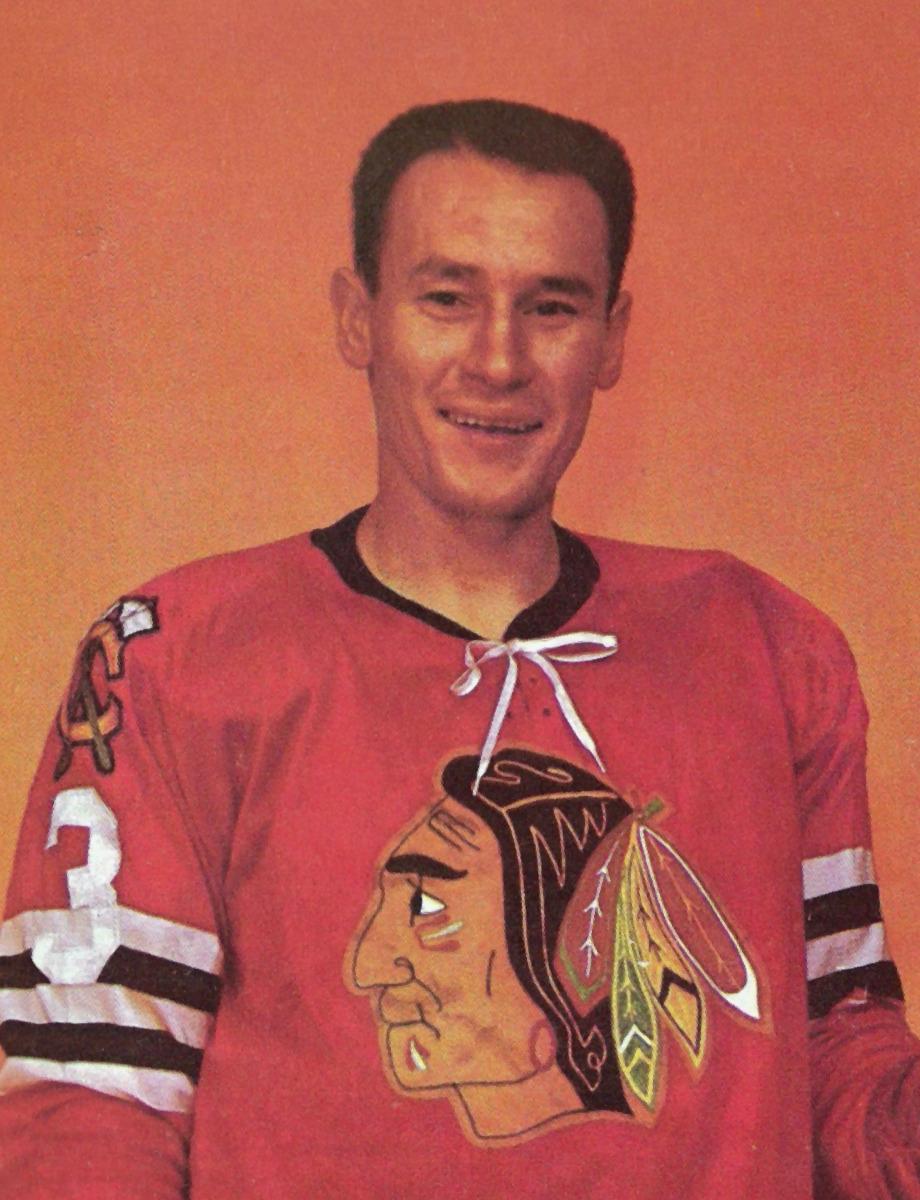
Pierre Pilote, three-time winner.

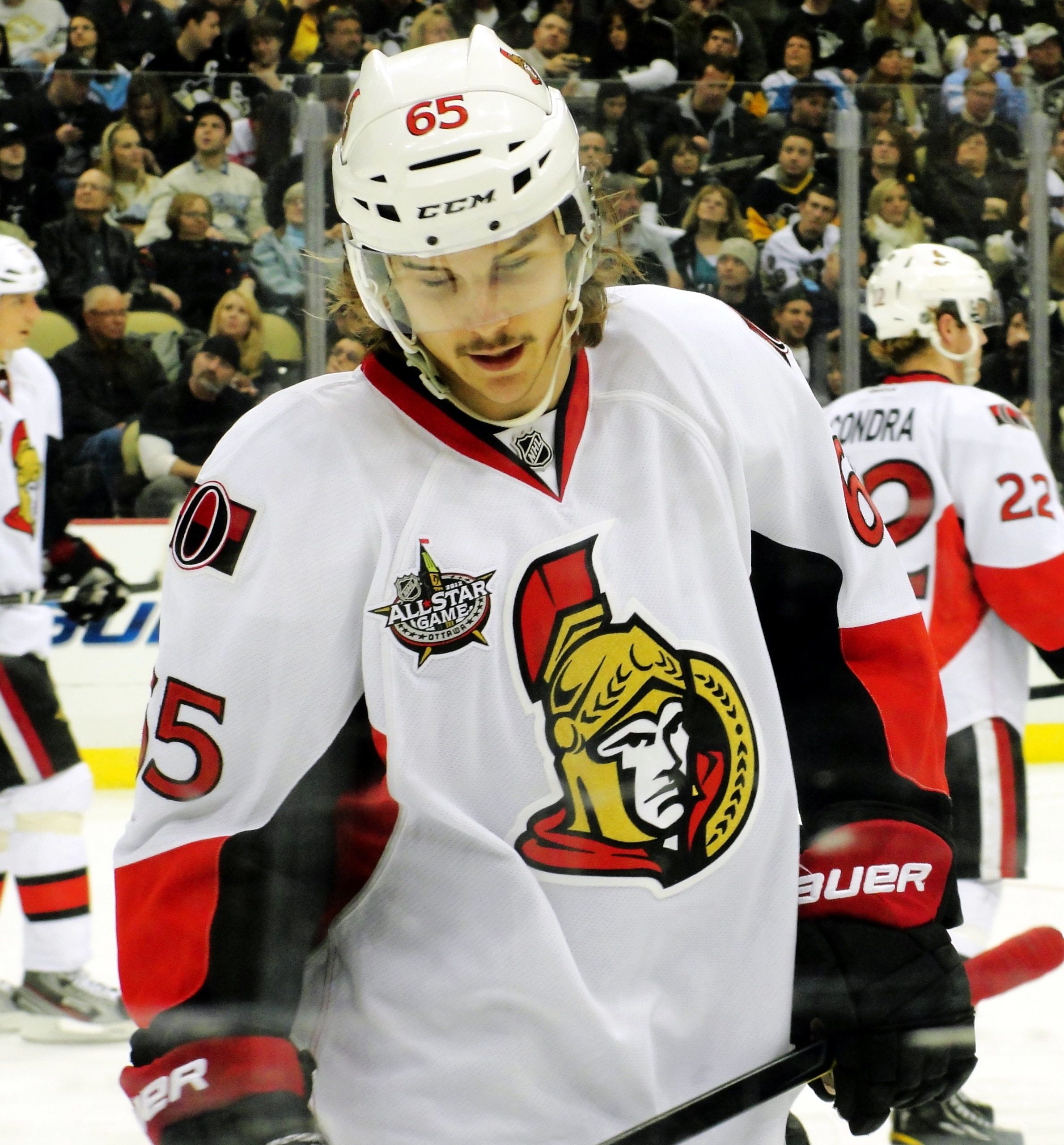
Erik Karlsson, three-time winner.

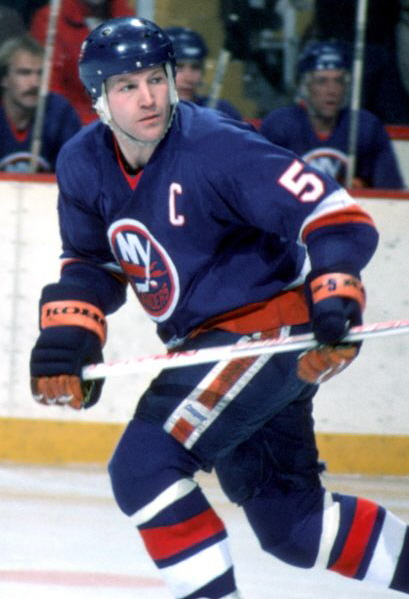
Denis Potvin, three-time winner.

^ Player is still active
† Player's team won the Stanley Cup
* Player elected to the Hockey Hall of Fame
~ Player not yet eligible for the Hockey Hall of Fame

Season	Winner	Team	Win #	Team Win #
1953–54	Red Kelly*	Detroit Red Wings	1	1
1954–55	Doug Harvey*	Montreal Canadiens	1	1
1955–56	Doug Harvey*	Montreal Canadiens†	2	2
1956–57	Doug Harvey*	Montreal Canadiens†	3	3
1957–58	Doug Harvey*	Montreal Canadiens†	4	4
1958–59	Tom Johnson*	Montreal Canadiens†	1	5
1959–60	Doug Harvey*	Montreal Canadiens†	5	6
1960–61	Doug Harvey*	Montreal Canadiens	6	7
1961–62	Doug Harvey*	New York Rangers	7	1
1962–63	Pierre Pilote*	Chicago Black Hawks	1	1
1963–64	Pierre Pilote*	Chicago Black Hawks	2	2
1964–65	Pierre Pilote*	Chicago Black Hawks	3	3
1965–66	Jacques Laperriere*	Montreal Canadiens†	1	8
1966–67	Harry Howell*	New York Rangers	1	2
1967–68	Bobby Orr	Boston Bruins	1	1
1968–69	Bobby Orr*	Boston Bruins	2	2
1969–70	Bobby Orr*	Boston Bruins†	3	3
1970–71	Bobby Orr*	Boston Bruins	4	4
1971–72	Bobby Orr*	Boston Bruins†	5	5
1972–73	Bobby Orr*	Boston Bruins	6	6
1973–74	Bobby Orr*	Boston Bruins	7	7
1974–75	Bobby Orr*	Boston Bruins	8	8
1975–76	Denis Potvin*	New York Islanders	1	1
1976–77	Larry Robinson*	Montreal Canadiens†	1	9
1977–78	Denis Potvin*	New York Islanders	2	2
1978–79	Denis Potvin*	New York Islanders	3	3
1979–80	Larry Robinson*	Montreal Canadiens	2	10
1980–81	Randy Carlyle	Pittsburgh Penguins	1	1
1981–82	Doug Wilson*	Chicago Black Hawks	1	4
1982–83	Rod Langway*	Washington Capitals	1	1
1983–84	Rod Langway*	Washington Capitals	2	2
1984–85	Paul Coffey*	Edmonton Oilers†	1	1
1985–86	Paul Coffey*	Edmonton Oilers	2	2
1986–87	Ray Bourque*	Boston Bruins	1	9
1987–88	Ray Bourque*	Boston Bruins	2	10
1988–89	Chris Chelios*	Montreal Canadiens	1	11
1989–90	Ray Bourque*	Boston Bruins	3	11
1990–91	Ray Bourque*	Boston Bruins	4	12
1991–92	Brian Leetch*	New York Rangers	1	3
1992–93	Chris Chelios*	Chicago Blackhawks	2	5
1993–94	Ray Bourque*	Boston Bruins	5	13
1994–95	Paul Coffey*	Detroit Red Wings	3	2
1995–96	Chris Chelios*	Chicago Blackhawks	3	6
1996–97	Brian Leetch*	New York Rangers	2	4
1997–98	Rob Blake*	Los Angeles Kings	1	1
1998–99	Al MacInnis*	St. Louis Blues	1	1
1999–2000	Chris Pronger*	St. Louis Blues	1	2
2000–01	Nicklas Lidstrom*	Detroit Red Wings	1	3
2001–02	Nicklas Lidstrom*	Detroit Red Wings†	2	4
2002–03	Nicklas Lidstrom*	Detroit Red Wings	3	5
2003–04	Scott Niedermayer*	New Jersey Devils	1	1
2004–05	Season cancelled due to the 2004–05 NHL lockout			
2005–06	Nicklas Lidstrom*	Detroit Red Wings	4	6
2006–07	Nicklas Lidstrom*	Detroit Red Wings	5	7
2007–08	Nicklas Lidstrom*	Detroit Red Wings†	6	8
2008–09	Zdeno Chara*	Boston Bruins	1	14
2009–10	Duncan Keith*	Chicago Blackhawks†	1	7
2010–11	Nicklas Lidstrom*	Detroit Red Wings	7	9
2011–12	Erik Karlsson^	Ottawa Senators	1	1
2012–13	P. K. Subban	Montreal Canadiens	1	12
2013–14	Duncan Keith*	Chicago Blackhawks	2	8
2014–15	Erik Karlsson^	Ottawa Senators	2	2
2015–16	Drew Doughty^	Los Angeles Kings	1	2
2016–17	Brent Burns^	San Jose Sharks	1	1
2017–18	Victor Hedman^	Tampa Bay Lightning	1	1
2018–19	Mark Giordano~	Calgary Flames	1	1
2019–20	Roman Josi^	Nashville Predators	1	1
2020–21	Adam Fox^	New York Rangers	1	5
2021–22	Cale Makar^	Colorado Avalanche†	1	1
2022–23	Erik Karlsson^	San Jose Sharks	3	2
2023–24	Quinn Hughes^	Vancouver Canucks	1	1
2024–25	Cale Makar^	Colorado Avalanche	2	2
2025–26	Zach Werenski^	Columbus Blue Jackets	1	1

== See also ==
- List of National Hockey League awards
- List of NHL players
- List of NHL statistical leaders
