= Rudy Pilous =

Canadian ice hockey player and coach

- Hockey Hall of Fame, 1985 (Builder)
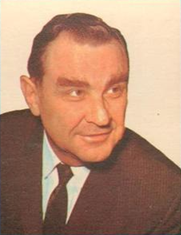
- Born: August 11, 1914 Winnipeg, Manitoba, Canada
- Died: December 5, 1994 (aged 80) St. Catharines, Ontario, Canada
- Coached for: Chicago Black Hawks; Winnipeg Jets

Rudolph Pilous (August 11, 1914 – December 5, 1994) was a Canadian ice hockey player and coach, born in Winnipeg, Manitoba. Pilous won the Stanley Cup coaching the Chicago Black Hawks in 1961 alongside winning the Avco World Trophy three times (1976, 1978, 1979) as general manager of the Winnipeg Jets of the World Hockey Association. He was inducted into the Hockey Hall of Fame in 1985 in the builder category. He is credited with initiating the action of pulling the goalie for an extra forward when there is a delayed penalty or when a team is losing by a goal in the last few minutes of play.

== Playing career ==
Pilous played junior ice hockey in the Manitoba Junior Hockey League before becoming a New York Rangers prospect. During 1937–38, Pilous played minor professional hockey with the New York Rovers of the Eastern Hockey League. Unable to reach the National Hockey League, Pilous transferred to the St. Catharines Saints, a senior ice hockey in the Ontario Hockey Association Senior division from 1938 to 1941.

== Coach and team builder ==
In 1943, Pilous cofounded the St. Catharines Falcons, a junior ice hockey team in the Ontario Hockey Association. Pilous left the Falcons in 1946, spending the 1946–47 season as a scout for the nearby Buffalo Bisons. Pilous spent the 1947–48 season in Houston, Texas, winning the USHL Championship. In 1948–49, Pilous led the San Diego Skyhawks to the Pacific Coast Hockey League title.

After the PCHL, Pilous returned to the team he founded in St. Catharines, now known as the St. Catharines Teepees. He coached the team to a Memorial Cup championship in the 1954 Memorial Cup. He was its general manager for the 1960 Memorial Cup victory.

Pilous coached the Chicago Black Hawks from 1958 to 1963. In the 1961 Stanley Cup Final, he led the Hawks to Stanley Cup victory. Between 1956 and 1968, he was the only coach to win the Stanley Cup other than Toe Blake and Punch Imlach. Pilous was let go after the 1963 season for Billy Reay.

Pilous coached the Denver Invaders in 1963–64 to the Western Hockey League's Governor's Trophy. After a brief stint with the Hamilton Red Wings, Pilous was hired to be the initial general manager of the expansion Oakland Seals in 1967. Pilous was quickly dismissed by team owners, and joined the Denver Spurs of the WHL, building them into a first place team by 1972.

Pilous returned to his childhood home in Manitoba, with the Brandon Wheat Kings and subsequently coaching the Winnipeg Jets in 1974. Pilous later became general manager, and led the Jets to Avco World Trophy championships in 1976 and 1978. He was pushed out of the GM position prior to the start of the 1978-79 season, where the Jets won their third and final Avco trophy.

Pilous' coaching career ended where it started in St. Catharines 43 years earlier, at the helm of the St. Catharines Saints from 1983 to 1986.

== Personal life and death ==
Pilous died at his home of a heart attack on December 5, 1994. He was survived by his wife Margaret and his two daughters, Rosemarie and Mary Lou.

== Coaching record ==
Team	Year	Regular season						Post season			
Team	Year	G	W	L	T	Pts	Finish	W	L	Pct.	Result
CHI	1957–58	37	14	22	1	29	5th in NHL				Did not qualify
CHI	1958–59	70	28	29	13	69	3rd in NHL	2	4	.333	Lost in semifinals (MTL)
CHI	1959–60	70	28	29	13	69	3rd in NHL	0	4	.000	Lost in semifinals (MTL)
CHI	1960–61	70	29	24	17	75	3rd in NHL	8	4	.667	Won Stanley Cup (DET)
CHI	1961–62	70	31	26	13	75	3rd in NHL	6	6	.500	Lost Stanley Cup Final (TOR)
CHI	1962–63	70	32	21	17	81	2nd in NHL	2	4	.333	Lost in semifinals (DET)
WIN	1974–75	65	34	26	5	73	3rd in Canadian				Did not qualify
WHA totals		65	34	26	5	73					
NHL totals		387	162	151	74	398		18	22	.450	5 playoff appearances 1 Stanley Cup

== Awards and achievements ==
- USHL Championship (1948)
- PCHL Championship (1949)
- Memorial Cup Championships (1954 & 1960)
- Stanley Cup Championship (1961)
- WHL regular season championship (1964)
- Avco Cup (WHA) (1976, 1978, & 1979)
- Inducted into the Hockey Hall of Fame in 1985
- Honoured Member of the Manitoba Hockey Hall of Fame

Preceded by Tommy Ivan	Head coach of the Chicago Black Hawks; 1957–63	Succeeded by Billy Reay
Preceded by Position created	General manager of the California Seals; 1967	Succeeded by Bert Olmstead
Preceded by Annis Stukus	General manager of the Winnipeg Jets; 1974–78	Succeeded by John Ferguson, Sr.
Preceded by Bobby Hull	Head coach of the Winnipeg Jets; 1974–75	Succeeded by Bobby Hull
