= Ab McDonald =

Canadian ice hockey player (1936–2018)

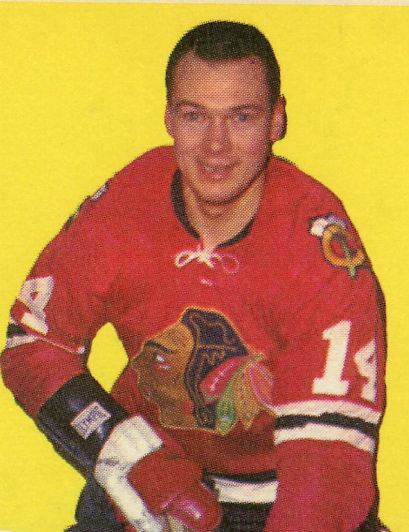
- McDonald in 1963
- Born: February 18, 1936 Winnipeg, Manitoba, Canada
- Died: September 4, 2018 (aged 82) Winnipeg, Manitoba, Canada
- Height: 6 ft 2 in (188 cm)
- Weight: 194 lb (88 kg; 13 st 12 lb)
- Position: Left wing
- Shot: Left
- Played for: Montreal Canadiens; Chicago Black Hawks; Boston Bruins; Detroit Red Wings; Pittsburgh Penguins; St. Louis Blues; Winnipeg Jets
- Playing career: 1956–1974

Alvin Brian McDonald (February 18, 1936 – September 4, 2018) was a Canadian professional ice hockey forward.

== Career ==
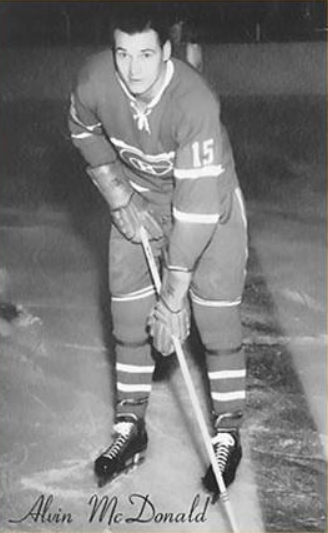
Late 1950s photo of Alvin "Ab" McDonald for the Montreal Canadiens

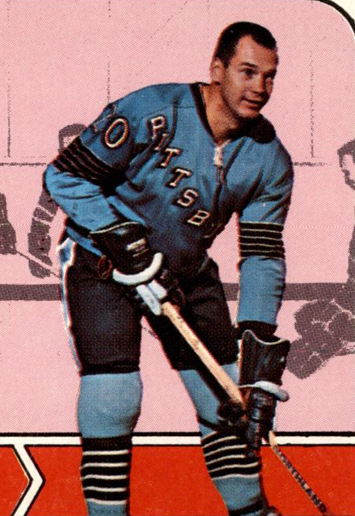
McDonald, first captain of the Pittsburgh Penguins

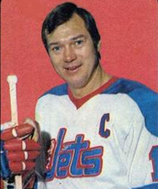
McDonald, first captain of the Winnipeg Jets.

Born in Winnipeg, Manitoba, McDonald began his professional hockey career with the Montreal Canadiens of the National Hockey League (NHL) in 1958. He later played for the Chicago Black Hawks, Detroit Red Wings, Boston Bruins, Pittsburgh Penguins, and St. Louis Blues. He won four straight Stanley Cups: three with Montreal followed by another with Chicago. His goal in game six of the 1961 Stanley Cup Final gave Chicago the series win, which they did not do so again for over 40 years. He was the first team captain of the Penguins and Winnipeg Jets organizations, and scored the first goal for the Jets in the World Hockey Association (WHA). He ended his career after 147 games for Winnipeg, retiring after the 1973–74 season. He died at his home in Winnipeg from cancer on September 4, 2018, at the age of 82.

== Career statistics ==
			Regular season					Playoffs
Season	Team	League	GP	G	A	Pts	PIM	GP	G	A	Pts	PIM
1951–52	St. Boniface Canadiens	MJHL	20	20	15	35	—	—	—	—	—	—
1952–53	St. Boniface Canadiens	MJHL	35	26	24	50	0	8	5	7	12	0
1952–53	St. Boniface Canadiens	M-Cup	—	—	—	—	—	9	6	5	11	6
1953–54	St. Boniface Canadiens	MJHL	35	33	25	58	14	10	7	6	13	4
1953–54	St. Boniface Canadiens	M-Cup	—	—	—	—	—	8	2	2	4	6
1954–55	St. Catharines Teepees	OHA-Jr.	49	33	37	70	20	10	2	6	8	25
1955–56	St. Catharines Teepees	OHA-Jr.	48	49	34	83	24	6	4	2	6	9
1956–57	Rochester Americans	AHL	64	21	31	52	8	9	3	1	4	0
1957–58	Rochester Americans	AHL	70	30	33	63	18	—	—	—	—	—
1957–58	Montreal Canadiens	NHL	—	—	—	—	—	2	0	0	0	2
1958–59	Montreal Canadiens	NHL	69	13	23	36	35	11	1	1	2	6
1959–60	Montreal Canadiens	NHL	68	9	13	22	26	—	—	—	—	—
1960–61	Chicago Black Hawks	NHL	61	17	16	33	22	8	2	2	4	0
1961–62	Chicago Black Hawks	NHL	65	22	18	40	8	12	6	6	12	0
1962–63	Chicago Black Hawks	NHL	69	20	41	61	12	6	2	3	5	9
1963–64	Chicago Black Hawks	NHL	70	14	32	46	19	7	2	2	4	0
1964–65	Providence Reds	AHL	6	2	1	3	2	—	—	—	—	—
1964–65	Boston Bruins	NHL	60	9	9	18	6	—	—	—	—	—
1965–66	Detroit Red Wings	NHL	43	6	16	22	6	10	1	4	5	2
1965–66	Memphis Wings	CPHL	20	9	6	15	4	—	—	—	—	—
1966–67	Pittsburgh Hornets	AHL	61	25	31	56	22	9	5	2	7	4
1966–67	Detroit Red Wings	NHL	12	2	0	2	2	—	—	—	—	—
1967–68	Pittsburgh Penguins	NHL	74	22	21	43	38	—	—	—	—	—
1968–69	St. Louis Blues	NHL	68	21	21	42	12	12	2	1	3	10
1969–70	St. Louis Blues	NHL	64	25	30	55	8	16	5	10	15	13
1970–71	St. Louis Blues	NHL	20	0	5	5	6	—	—	—	—	—
1971–72	Detroit Red Wings	NHL	19	2	3	5	0	—	—	—	—	—
1971–72	Tidewater Wings	AHL	41	5	7	12	4	—	—	—	—	—
1972–73	Winnipeg Jets	WHA	77	17	24	41	16	14	2	5	7	2
1973–74	Winnipeg Jets	WHA	70	12	17	29	8	4	0	1	1	2
NHL totals			762	182	248	430	200	84	21	29	50	42
WHA totals			147	29	41	70	24	18	2	6	8	4

== Awards and achievements ==
- MJHL Second All-Star Team (1953)
- Turnbull Cup MJHL Championships (1953 and 1954)
- MJHL Scoring Champion (1954)
- NHL All-Star Game (1958, 1959, 1961, 1969 and 1970)
- Stanley Cup Championships (1958, 1959, 1960 and 1961)
- Inducted into the Manitoba Sports Hall of Fame and Museum in 1996
- "Honoured Member" of the Manitoba Hockey Hall of Fame

== Transactions ==
- June 7, 1960 – Traded to Chicago by Montreal with Reggie Fleming, Bob Courcy and Cec Hoekstra for Glen Skov, Terry Gray, Bob Bailey, Lorne Ferguson and the rights to Danny Lewicki.
- June 8, 1964 – Traded to Boston by Chicago with Reggie Fleming for Doug Mohns.
- May 31, 1965 – Traded to Detroit by Boston with Bob McCord and Ken Stephanson for Albert Langlois, Ron Harris, Parker MacDonald and Bob Dillabough.
- June 6, 1967 – Claimed by Pittsburgh from Detroit in Expansion Draft.
- June 11, 1968 – Traded to St. Louis by Pittsburgh for Lou Angotti.
- May 12, 1971 – Traded to Detroit by St. Louis with Bob Wall and Mike Lowe to complete transaction that sent Carl Brewer to St. Louis (February 22, 1971).
- February 12, 1972 – Selected by Winnipeg (WHA) in 1972 WHA General Player Draft.

== Personal life ==
McDonald and his wife Pat were married for sixty years, having three daughters and two sons together.

Preceded by Position created	Pittsburgh Penguins captain 1967–68	Succeeded by Earl Ingarfield
Preceded by Position created	Winnipeg Jets captain 1972–74	Succeeded by Dan Johnson
