= George Hayes (ice hockey) =

Canadian ice hockey official

- Hockey Hall of Fame, 1988 (Official)
- Born: June 21, 1914 Montreal, Quebec, Canada
- Died: November 19, 1987 (aged 73) Ingersoll, Ontario, Canada
- Position: Linesman
- Playing career: 1946–1965

George Hayes (June 21, 1914 – November 19, 1987) was a Canadian linesman in the National Hockey League.

== Early life ==
Hayes was born in Montreal, Quebec, Canada. He began officiating minor league hockey games before moving to the Ontario Hockey Association and American Hockey League.

== Career ==
Hayes started officiating in the NHL in 1946 and became the first official to work 1,000 games. He was also a part of a European tour with the New York Rangers and Boston Bruins in 1959. Hayes stopped officiating games in 1965 after refusing to take an eye exam mandated by then-NHL President Clarence Campbell.

During summers, Hayes scouted for the Cleveland Indians in Ontario. He was elected to the Hockey Hall of Fame in 1988 for his officiating.
