= Elmer Vasko =

Canadian ice hockey player

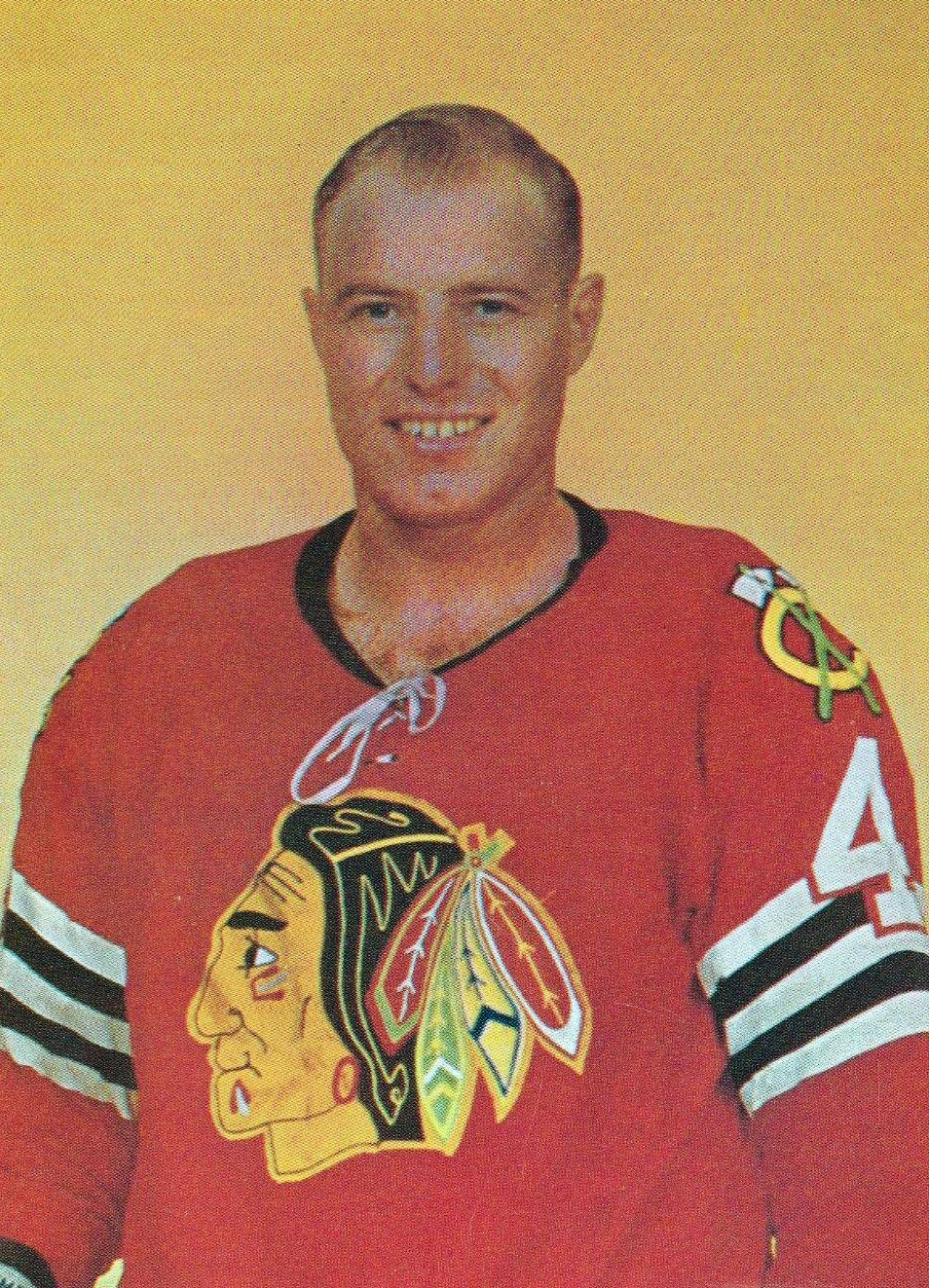
- Vasko with the Chicago Black Hawks, c. 1963
- Born: December 11, 1935 Duparquet, Quebec, Canada
- Died: October 30, 1998 (aged 62) Dorval, Quebec, Canada
- Height: 6 ft 2 in (188 cm)
- Weight: 200 lb (91 kg; 14 st 4 lb)
- Position: Defence
- Shot: Left
- Played for: Chicago Black Hawks; Minnesota North Stars
- Playing career: 1955–1970

Elmer "Moose" Vasko (December 11, 1935 – October 30, 1998) was a Canadian professional ice hockey defenceman who played 13 seasons in the National Hockey League for the Chicago Black Hawks and Minnesota North Stars. He was on the Blackhawks team that won the Stanley Cup in 1961.

== Personal ==
Vasko was born in Duparquet, Quebec. He was one of the few players of Slovak descent in the NHL's younger years. Vasko also never lost any of his teeth during his NHL career, despite the lack of mouthguards or helmets in his playing days. He was a second team all star in 1962-63 and 1963-64.

Vasko's great niece, Alexa Vasko, is a professional ice hockey player for the Ottawa Charge of the Professional Women's Hockey League (PWHL).

== Career statistics ==
			Regular season					Playoffs
Season	Team	League	GP	G	A	Pts	PIM	GP	G	A	Pts	PIM
1953–54	St. Catharines Teepees	OHA	59	5	17	22	25	15	0	2	2	10
1953–54	St. Catharines Teepees	M-Cup	—	—	—	—	—	11	0	2	2	6
1954–55	St. Catharines Teepees	OHA	49	16	20	36	75	11	2	3	5	17
1955–56	St. Catharines Teepees	OHA	47	9	31	40	90	6	2	3	5	8
1955–56	Buffalo Bisons	AHL	4	0	3	3	4	3	1	0	1	2
1956–57	Chicago Black Hawks	NHL	64	3	12	15	31	—	—	—	—	—
1957–58	Chicago Black Hawks	NHL	59	6	20	26	51	—	—	—	—	—
1958–59	Chicago Black Hawks	NHL	63	6	10	16	52	6	0	1	1	4
1959–60	Chicago Black Hawks	NHL	69	3	27	30	110	4	0	0	0	0
1960–61	Chicago Black Hawks	NHL	63	4	18	22	40	12	1	1	2	23
1961–62	Chicago Black Hawks	NHL	64	2	22	24	87	12	0	0	0	4
1962–63	Chicago Black Hawks	NHL	64	4	9	13	70	6	0	1	1	8
1963–64	Chicago Black Hawks	NHL	70	2	18	20	65	7	0	0	0	4
1964–65	Chicago Black Hawks	NHL	69	1	10	11	56	14	1	2	3	20
1965–66	Chicago Black Hawks	NHL	56	1	7	8	44	3	0	0	0	4
1967–68	Minnesota North Stars	NHL	70	1	6	7	45	14	0	2	2	6
1968–69	Minnesota North Stars	NHL	72	1	7	8	68	—	—	—	—	—
1969–70	Minnesota North Stars	NHL	3	0	0	0	0	—	—	—	—	—
1969–70	Salt Lake Golden Eagles	WHL	54	4	6	10	34	—	—	—	—	—
NHL totals			786	34	166	200	719	78	2	7	9	73

Preceded by Bob Woytowich	Minnesota North Stars captain 1968–69	Succeeded by Claude Larose
