= 1961–62 NHL transactions =

The following is a list of all team-to-team transactions that have occurred in the National Hockey League (NHL) during the 1961–62 NHL season. It lists which team each player has been traded to and for which player(s) or other consideration(s), if applicable.

== Transactions ==
May 10, 1961	To Montreal Canadiens Fred Hilts	To Chicago Black Hawks Bob Turner
May 10, 1961	To Boston Bruins Terry Gray; Cliff Pennington	To Montreal Canadiens Stan Maxwell; Willie O'Ree cash
June 1, 1961	To Toronto Maple Leafs Norm Corcoran	To Montreal Canadiens Guy Rousseau
June 12, 1961	To Detroit Red Wings Ed Litzenberger	To Chicago Black Hawks Gerry Melnyk; Brian Smith
June 12, 1961	To Detroit Red Wings Bill Gadsby	To New York Rangers Les Hunt
June 13, 1961	To Montreal Canadiens Lou Fontinato	To New York Rangers Doug Harvey
June 13, 1961	To Montreal Canadiens John Hanna	To New York Rangers Albert Langlois
September, 1961 (exact date unknown)	To Chicago Black Hawks Art Stratton	To New York Rangers cash
October 26, 1961	To Boston Bruins Wayne Connelly	To Montreal Canadiens loan of Bob Armstrong loan of Dallas Smith cash
November, 1961 (exact date unknown)	To Boston Bruins cash	To Montreal Canadiens Billy Carter
February 15, 1962	To Detroit Red Wings Noel Price	To New York Rangers Pete Goegan cash
