= 1961–62 New York Rangers season =

NHL hockey team season

1961–62 New York Rangers
- League: 4th NHL
- 1961–62 record: 26–32–12
- Home record: 16–11–8
- Road record: 10–21–4
- Goals for: 195
- Goals against: 207

Team information
- General manager: Muzz Patrick
- Coach: Doug Harvey
- Captain: Andy Bathgate
- Alternate captains: Albert Langlois
- Arena: Madison Square Garden

Team leaders
- Goals: Andy Bathgate (28)
- Assists: Andy Bathgate (56)
- Points: Andy Bathgate (84)
- Penalty minutes: Albert Langlois (90)
- Wins: Gump Worsley (22)
- Goals against average: Marcel Paille (2.80)

The 1961–62 New York Rangers season was the franchise's 36th season. During the regular season, the Rangers finished fourth in the NHL with 64 points, and qualified for the playoffs. In the NHL semi-finals, the Rangers lost to the Toronto Maple Leafs in six games.

== Regular season ==
=== Final standings ===
National Hockey League
		GP	W	L	T	GF	GA	DIFF	Pts
1	Montreal Canadiens	70	42	14	14	259	166	+93	98
2	Toronto Maple Leafs	70	37	22	11	232	180	+52	85
3	Chicago Black Hawks	70	31	26	13	217	186	+31	75
4	New York Rangers	70	26	32	12	195	207	−12	64
5	Detroit Red Wings	70	23	33	14	184	219	−35	60
6	Boston Bruins	70	15	47	8	177	306	−129	38

=== Record vs. opponents ===
1961–62 NHL Records
Team	BOS	CHI	DET	MTL	NYR	TOR
Boston	—	2–10–2	4–8–2	3–10–1	2–10–2	4–9–1
Chicago	10–2–2	—	7–3–4	3–9–2	7–6–1	4–6–4
Detroit	8–4–2	3–7–4	—	3–8–3	6–5–3	3–9–2
Montreal	10–3–1	9–3–2	8–3–3	—	8–1–5	7–4–3
New York	10–2–2	6–7–1	5–6–3	1–8–5	—	4–9–1
Toronto	9–4–1	6–4–4	9–3–2	4–7–3	9–4–1	—

== Schedule and results ==
1961–62 regular season
October: 6–4–2 (home: 3–2–1; road: 3–2–1)

Game	October	Opponent	Score	Record
1	11	@ Boston Bruins	6–2	1–0–0
2	12	Boston Bruins	6–3	2–0–0
3	14	@ Montreal Canadiens	3–1	2–1–0
4	15	Toronto Maple Leafs	2–1	3–1–0
5	18	Montreal Canadiens	5–2	3–2–0
6	19	@ Chicago Black Hawks	4–2	4–2–0
7	21	@ Detroit Red Wings	4–4	4–2–1
8	22	Detroit Red Wings	5–4	4–3–1
9	25	Chicago Black Hawks	1–1	4–3–2
10	28	@ Toronto Maple Leafs	5–1	4–4–2
11	29	Toronto Maple Leafs	4–2	5–4–2
12	31	@ Chicago Black Hawks	4–2	6–4–2

November: 4–2–4 (home: 3–0–3; road: 1–2–1)

Game	November	Opponent	Score	Record
13	2	@ Detroit Red Wings	1–0	6–5–2
14	4	@ Montreal Canadiens	3–3	6–5–3
15	8	Boston Bruins	4–4	6–5–4
16	12	Chicago Black Hawks	4–1	7–5–4
17	18	Montreal Canadiens	4–4	7–5–5
18	19	Toronto Maple Leafs	5–3	8–5–5
19	22	Detroit Red Wings	4–0	9–5–5
20	23	@ Boston Bruins	4–3	10–5–5
21	25	@ Toronto Maple Leafs	6–0	10–6–5
22	26	Montreal Canadiens	2–2	10–6–6

December: 4–7–2 (home: 3–4–0; road: 1–3–2)

Game	December	Opponent	Score	Record
23	2	@ Boston Bruins	3–1	10–7–6
24	3	Boston Bruins	3–1	11–7–6
25	6	Chicago Black Hawks	8–3	11–8–6
26	7	@ Detroit Red Wings	3–3	11–8–7
27	9	@ Montreal Canadiens	2–2	11–8–8
28	10	Toronto Maple Leafs	3–2	11–9–8
29	16	@ Toronto Maple Leafs	4–2	11–10–8
30	17	@ Chicago Black Hawks	3–1	11–11–8
31	20	Detroit Red Wings	6–1	12–11–8
32	23	Chicago Black Hawks	7–3	13–11–8
33	25	@ Detroit Red Wings	6–4	14–11–8
34	27	Montreal Canadiens	3–0	14–12–8
35	31	Boston Bruins	7–4	14–13–8

January: 2–10–0 (home: 1–3–0; road: 1–7–0)

Game	January	Opponent	Score	Record
36	1	@ Boston Bruins	4–2	15–13–8
37	3	@ Chicago Black Hawks	2–1	15–14–8
38	6	@ Montreal Canadiens	5–1	15–15–8
39	7	Toronto Maple Leafs	4–3	15–16–8
40	13	@ Chicago Black Hawks	4–2	15–17–8
41	14	@ Detroit Red Wings	2–1	15–18–8
42	17	@ Toronto Maple Leafs	4–2	15–19–8
43	21	@ Chicago Black Hawks	3–1	15–20–8
44	24	Detroit Red Wings	3–0	15–21–8
45	27	@ Montreal Canadiens	5–1	15–22–8
46	28	Chicago Black Hawks	3–0	15–23–8
47	31	Boston Bruins	5–0	16–23–8

February: 6–5–3 (home: 4–0–3; road: 2–5–0)

Game	February	Opponent	Score	Record
48	1	@ Boston Bruins	5–3	17–23–8
49	3	@ Toronto Maple Leafs	4–1	17–24–8
50	4	Montreal Canadiens	2–1	18–24–8
51	7	Detroit Red Wings	2–2	18–24–9
52	10	Chicago Black Hawks	2–1	19–24–9
53	11	@ Boston Bruins	5–3	20–24–9
54	14	@ Chicago Black Hawks	4–3	20–25–9
55	15	@ Detroit Red Wings	4–3	20–26–9
56	17	@ Toronto Maple Leafs	5–3	20–27–9
57	18	Toronto Maple Leafs	6–2	21–27–9
58	21	Boston Bruins	4–2	22–27–9
59	24	@ Montreal Canadiens	4–2	22–28–9
60	25	Montreal Canadiens	3–3	22–28–10
61	28	Boston Bruins	2–2	22–28–11

March: 4–4–1 (home: 2–2–1; road: 2–2–0)

Game	March	Opponent	Score	Record
62	3	@ Toronto Maple Leafs	3–1	22–29–11
63	4	Detroit Red Wings	4–2	22–30–11
64	6	@ Detroit Red Wings	5–4	23–30–11
65	11	Montreal Canadiens	2–1	23–31–11
66	14	Detroit Red Wings	3–2	24–31–11
67	17	@ Montreal Canadiens	2–0	24–32–11
68	18	Toronto Maple Leafs	2–2	24–32–12
69	22	@ Boston Bruins	4–3	25–32–12
70	25	Chicago Black Hawks	4–1	26–32–12

Legend: Win (2 points) Loss (0 points) Tie (1 point)

== Playoffs ==
1962 Stanley Cup playoffs
Semifinals vs. (2) Toronto Maple Leafs – Toronto wins 4–2

Game	Date	Visitor	Score	Home	OT	Series
1	March 27	New York Rangers	2–4	Toronto Maple Leafs		Toronto leads series 1–0
2	March 29	New York Rangers	1–2	Toronto Maple Leafs		Toronto leads series 2–0
3	April 1	Toronto Maple Leafs	4–5	New York Rangers		Toronto leads series 2–1
4	April 3	Toronto Maple Leafs	2–4	New York Rangers		Series tied 2–2
5	April 5	New York Rangers	2–3	Toronto Maple Leafs	OT	Toronto leads series 3–2
6	April 7	New York Rangers	1–7	Toronto Maple Leafs		Toronto wins series 4–2

Legend: Win Loss

== Player statistics ==
Skaters

Regular season
Player	GP	G	A	Pts	PIM
Andy Bathgate	70	28	56	84	44
Dean Prentice	68	22	38	60	20
Earl Ingarfield	70	26	31	57	18
Andy Hebenton	70	18	24	42	10
Camille Henry	60	23	15	38	8
Doug Harvey	69	6	24	30	42
Ken Schinkel	65	7	21	28	17
Ted Hampson	68	4	24	28	10
Jean-Guy Gendron	69	14	11	25	71
Albert Langlois	69	7	18	25	90
Pat Hannigan	56	8	14	22	34
Harry Howell	66	6	15	21	89
Dave Balon	30	4	11	15	11
Johnny Wilson	40	11	3	14	14
Jean Ratelle	31	4	8	12	4
Irv Spencer	43	2	10	12	31
Larry Cahan	57	2	7	9	85
Vic Hadfield	44	3	1	4	22
Pete Goegan^{†}	7	0	2	2	6
Bob Cunningham	1	0	0	0	0
Rod Gilbert	1	0	0	0	0
Mel Pearson	3	0	0	0	2
Jack Bownass	4	0	0	0	4

Playoffs
Player	GP	G	A	Pts	PIM
Rod Gilbert	4	2	3	5	4
Dave Balon	6	2	3	5	2
Earl Ingarfield	6	3	2	5	2
Johnny Wilson	6	2	2	4	4
Jean-Guy Gendron	6	3	1	4	2
Andy Hebenton	6	1	2	3	0
Andy Bathgate	6	1	2	3	4
Dean Prentice	3	0	2	2	0
Harry Howell	6	0	1	1	8
Albert Langlois	6	0	1	1	2
Ted Hampson	6	0	1	1	0
Ken Schinkel	2	1	0	1	0
Doug Harvey	6	0	1	1	2
Vic Hadfield	4	0	0	0	2
Larry Cahan	6	0	0	0	10
Irv Spencer	1	0	0	0	2
Pat Hannigan	4	0	0	0	2
Camille Henry	5	0	0	0	0

Goaltenders

Regular season
Player	GP	TOI	W	L	T	GA	GAA	SA	SV%	SO
Lorne Worsley	60	3531	22	27	9	173	2.94	1981	.913	2
Marcel Paille	10	600	4	4	2	28	2.80	318	.912	0
Danny Olesevich	1	29	0	0	1	2	4.14	19	.895	0
Dave Dryden	1	40	0	1	0	3	4.50	26	.885	0

Playoffs
Player	GP	TOI	W	L	GA	GAA	SO
Lorne Worsley	6	384	2	4	21	3.28	0

^{†}Denotes player spent time with another team before joining Rangers. Stats reflect time with Rangers only.
^{‡}Traded mid-season. Stats reflect time with Rangers only.

Note:

Pos = Position;GP = Games played; G = Goals; A = Assists; Pts = Points; PIM = Penalty minutes; +/- = Plus/minus; PPG = Power-play goals; SHG = Short-handed goals; GWG = Game-winning goals
Pos = Position;GP = Games played; Min, TOI = Minutes played; W = Wins; L = Losses; T,T/OT = Ties; OTL = Overtime losses; GA = Goals-against; GAA = Goals-against average; SO = Shutouts; SA = Shots against; SV = Shots saved;SV% = Save percentage;

== See also ==
- 1961–62 NHL season
