= 1961–62 Montreal Canadiens season =

NHL hockey team season

1961–62 Montreal Canadiens
- Prince of Wales Trophy winners
- League: 1st NHL
- 1961–62 record: 42–14–14
- Home record: 26–2–7
- Road record: 16–12–7
- Goals for: 259
- Goals against: 166

Team information
- General manager: Frank J. Selke
- Coach: Toe Blake
- Captain: Jean Beliveau
- Arena: Montreal Forum

Team leaders
- Goals: Claude Provost (33)
- Assists: Ralph Backstrom (38)
- Points: Ralph Backstrom (65)
- Penalty minutes: Lou Fontinato (167)
- Wins: Jacques Plante (42)
- Goals against average: Jacques Plante (2.37)

The 1961–62 Montreal Canadiens season was the 53rd season in franchise history. The team placed first in the regular season to qualify for the playoffs. The Canadiens were eliminated in semi-finals by the Chicago Black Hawks 4 games to 2.

== Regular season ==
=== Final standings ===
National Hockey League
		GP	W	L	T	GF	GA	DIFF	Pts
1	Montreal Canadiens	70	42	14	14	259	166	+93	98
2	Toronto Maple Leafs	70	37	22	11	232	180	+52	85
3	Chicago Black Hawks	70	31	26	13	217	186	+31	75
4	New York Rangers	70	26	32	12	195	207	−12	64
5	Detroit Red Wings	70	23	33	14	184	219	−35	60
6	Boston Bruins	70	15	47	8	177	306	−129	38

=== Record vs. opponents ===
1961–62 NHL Records
Team	BOS	CHI	DET	MTL	NYR	TOR
Boston	—	2–10–2	4–8–2	3–10–1	2–10–2	4–9–1
Chicago	10–2–2	—	7–3–4	3–9–2	7–6–1	4–6–4
Detroit	8–4–2	3–7–4	—	3–8–3	6–5–3	3–9–2
Montreal	10–3–1	9–3–2	8–3–3	—	8–1–5	7–4–3
New York	10–2–2	6–7–1	5–6–3	1–8–5	—	4–9–1
Toronto	9–4–1	6–4–4	9–3–2	4–7–3	9–4–1	—

== Schedule and results ==
1961–62 regular season
October

Game	Result	Date	Score	Opponent	Record
1	W	October 14, 1961	3–1	New York Rangers (1961–62)	1–0–0
2	T	October 15, 1961	5–5	@ Boston Bruins (1961–62)	1–0–1
3	W	October 18, 1961	5–2	@ New York Rangers (1961–62)	2–0–1
4	W	October 21, 1961	6–2	Boston Bruins (1961–62)	3–0–1
5	W	October 22, 1961	3–2	@ Chicago Black Hawks (1961–62)	4–0–1
6	W	October 26, 1961	7–1	Chicago Black Hawks (1961–62)	5–0–1
7	W	October 28, 1961	7–5	Detroit Red Wings (1961–62)	6–0–1
8	W	October 29, 1961	6–3	@ Detroit Red Wings (1961–62)	7–0–1

November

Game	Result	Date	Score	Opponent	Record
9	L	November 1, 1961	2–3	@ Toronto Maple Leafs (1961–62)	7–1–1
10	L	November 2, 1961	2–5	Boston Bruins (1961–62)	7–2–1
11	T	November 4, 1961	3–3	New York Rangers (1961–62)	7–2–2
12	W	November 9, 1961	5–2	Toronto Maple Leafs (1961–62)	8–2–2
13	W	November 11, 1961	2–1	Chicago Black Hawks (1961–62)	9–2–2
14	L	November 12, 1961	0–3	@ Detroit Red Wings (1961–62)	9–3–2
15	L	November 15, 1961	2–3	@ Toronto Maple Leafs (1961–62)	9–4–2
16	L	November 16, 1961	2–3	@ Boston Bruins (1961–62)	9–5–2
17	T	November 18, 1961	4–4	@ New York Rangers (1961–62)	9–5–3
18	T	November 19, 1961	3–3	@ Chicago Black Hawks (1961–62)	9–5–4
19	W	November 23, 1961	5–3	Detroit Red Wings (1961–62)	10–5–4
20	W	November 25, 1961	5–0	Boston Bruins (1961–62)	11–5–4
21	T	November 26, 1961	2–2	@ New York Rangers (1961–62)	11–5–5
22	T	November 29, 1961	2–2	@ Toronto Maple Leafs (1961–62)	11–5–6
23	T	November 30, 1961	1–1	Toronto Maple Leafs (1961–62)	11–5–7

December

Game	Result	Date	Score	Opponent	Record
24	W	December 2, 1961	3–2	Detroit Red Wings (1961–62)	12–5–7
25	W	December 3, 1961	1–0	@ Chicago Black Hawks (1961–62)	13–5–7
26	W	December 7, 1961	4–1	Toronto Maple Leafs (1961–62)	14–5–7
27	T	December 9, 1961	2–2	New York Rangers (1961–62)	14–5–8
28	W	December 10, 1961	4–3	@ Boston Bruins (1961–62)	15–5–8
29	W	December 16, 1961	8–4	Boston Bruins (1961–62)	16–5–8
30	L	December 17, 1961	1–3	@ Detroit Red Wings (1961–62)	16–6–8
31	L	December 21, 1961	3–4	Chicago Black Hawks (1961–62)	16–7–8
32	W	December 23, 1961	6–1	Detroit Red Wings (1961–62)	17–7–8
33	W	December 25, 1961	5–2	@ Boston Bruins (1961–62)	18–7–8
34	W	December 27, 1961	3–0	@ New York Rangers (1961–62)	19–7–8
35	T	December 30, 1961	4–4	Chicago Black Hawks (1961–62)	19–7–9

January

Game	Result	Date	Score	Opponent	Record
36	L	January 1, 1962	0–2	@ Chicago Black Hawks (1961–62)	19–8–9
37	L	January 3, 1962	1–3	@ Toronto Maple Leafs (1961–62)	19–9–9
38	W	January 6, 1962	5–1	New York Rangers (1961–62)	20–9–9
39	T	January 7, 1962	2–2	@ Detroit Red Wings (1961–62)	20–9–10
40	W	January 11, 1962	4–2	Toronto Maple Leafs (1961–62)	21–9–10
41	W	January 13, 1962	5–3	Boston Bruins (1961–62)	22–9–10
42	W	January 14, 1962	4–1	@ Boston Bruins (1961–62)	23–9–10
43	W	January 17, 1962	7–3	@ Chicago Black Hawks (1961–62)	24–9–10
44	T	January 20, 1962	2–2	Detroit Red Wings (1961–62)	24–9–11
45	W	January 21, 1962	5–3	@ Detroit Red Wings (1961–62)	25–9–11
46	W	January 27, 1962	5–1	New York Rangers (1961–62)	26–9–11
47	W	January 28, 1962	5–1	@ Boston Bruins (1961–62)	27–9–11

February

Game	Result	Date	Score	Opponent	Record
48	W	February 1, 1962	5–2	Toronto Maple Leafs (1961–62)	28–9–11
49	W	February 3, 1962	8–1	Detroit Red Wings (1961–62)	29–9–11
50	L	February 4, 1962	1–2	@ New York Rangers (1961–62)	29–10–11
51	W	February 10, 1962	4–2	@ Toronto Maple Leafs (1961–62)	30–10–11
52	W	February 11, 1962	4–3	@ Chicago Black Hawks (1961–62)	31–10–11
53	W	February 15, 1962	9–1	Boston Bruins (1961–62)	32–10–11
54	W	February 17, 1962	6–2	Chicago Black Hawks (1961–62)	33–10–11
55	L	February 18, 1962	2–4	@ Detroit Red Wings (1961–62)	33–11–11
56	W	February 21, 1962	4–2	@ Toronto Maple Leafs (1961–62)	34–11–11
57	W	February 24, 1962	4–2	New York Rangers (1961–62)	35–11–11
58	T	February 25, 1962	3–3	@ New York Rangers (1961–62)	35–11–12

March

Game	Result	Date	Score	Opponent	Record
59	T	March 3, 1962	2–2	Detroit Red Wings (1961–62)	35–11–13
60	L	March 4, 1962	2–5	@ Chicago Black Hawks (1961–62)	35–12–13
61	T	March 8, 1962	1–1	Toronto Maple Leafs (1961–62)	35–12–14
62	W	March 10, 1962	5–2	Boston Bruins (1961–62)	36–12–14
63	W	March 11, 1962	2–1	@ New York Rangers (1961–62)	37–12–14
64	L	March 14, 1962	2–5	@ Toronto Maple Leafs (1961–62)	37–13–14
65	W	March 15, 1962	6–5	Chicago Black Hawks (1961–62)	38–13–14
66	W	March 17, 1962	2–0	New York Rangers (1961–62)	39–13–14
67	L	March 18, 1962	2–6	@ Boston Bruins (1961–62)	39–14–14
68	W	March 22, 1962	4–1	Toronto Maple Leafs (1961–62)	40–14–14
69	W	March 24, 1962	5–3	Chicago Black Hawks (1961–62)	41–14–14
70	W	March 25, 1962	5–2	@ Detroit Red Wings (1961–62)	42–14–14

Legend: Win (2 points) Loss (0 points) Tie (1 point)

== Player statistics ==
=== Regular season ===
==== Scoring ====
Player	Pos	GP	G	A	Pts	PIM
Ralph Backstrom	C	66	27	38	65	29
Claude Provost	RW	70	33	29	62	22
Bernie Geoffrion	RW	62	23	36	59	36
Gilles Tremblay	LW	70	32	22	54	28
Bill Hicke	RW	70	20	31	51	42
Henri Richard	C	54	21	29	50	48
Jean-Guy Talbot	D	70	5	42	47	90
Donnie Marshall	LW	66	18	28	46	12
Bobby Rousseau	RW	70	21	24	45	26
Dickie Moore	LW	57	19	22	41	54
Jean Beliveau	C	43	18	23	41	36
Phil Goyette	C	69	7	27	34	18
Marcel Bonin	W	33	7	14	21	41
J.C. Tremblay	D	70	3	17	20	18
Tom Johnson	D	62	1	17	18	45
Lou Fontinato	D	54	2	13	15	167
Al MacNeil	D	61	1	7	8	74
Red Berenson	C	4	1	2	3	4
Jean Gauthier	D	12	0	1	1	10
Billy Carter	C	7	0	0	0	4
Chuck Hamilton	LW	1	0	0	0	0
Jacques Plante	G	70	0	0	0	14

==== Goaltending ====
Player	MIN	GP	W	L	T	GA	GAA	SO
Jacques Plante	4200	70	42	14	14	166	2.37	4
Team:	4200	70	42	14	14	166	2.37	4

=== Playoffs ===
==== Scoring ====
Player	Pos	GP	G	A	Pts	PIM
Dickie Moore	LW	6	4	2	6	8
Phil Goyette	C	6	1	4	5	2
Claude Provost	RW	6	2	2	4	2
Jean Beliveau	C	6	2	1	3	4
Red Berenson	C	5	2	0	2	0
Jean-Guy Talbot	D	6	1	1	2	10
Bill Hicke	RW	6	0	2	2	14
Bobby Rousseau	RW	6	0	2	2	0
J.C. Tremblay	D	6	0	2	2	2
Gilles Tremblay	LW	6	1	0	1	2
Ralph Backstrom	C	5	0	1	1	6
Lou Fontinato	D	6	0	1	1	23
Bernie Geoffrion	RW	5	0	1	1	6
Tom Johnson	D	6	0	1	1	0
Donnie Marshall	LW	6	0	1	1	2
Al MacNeil	D	5	0	0	0	2
Keith McCreary	RW	1	0	0	0	0
Jacques Plante	G	6	0	0	0	0

==== Goaltending ====
Player	MIN	GP	W	L	GA	GAA	SO
Jacques Plante	360	6	2	4	19	3.17	0
Team:	360	6	2	4	19	3.17	0

Note:

Pos = Position;GP = Games played; G = Goals; A = Assists; Pts = Points; PIM = Penalty minutes; +/- = Plus/minus; PPG = Power-play goals; SHG = Short-handed goals; GWG = Game-winning goals
Pos = Position;GP = Games played; Min, TOI = Minutes played; W = Wins; L = Losses; T,T/OT = Ties; OTL = Overtime losses; GA = Goals-against; GAA = Goals-against average; SO = Shutouts; SA = Shots against; SV = Shots saved;SV% = Save percentage;

== See also ==
- 1961–62 NHL season
