= 1961–62 Detroit Red Wings season =

Sports season

1961–62 Detroit Red Wings
- League: 5th NHL
- 1961–62 record: 23–33–14
- Home record: 17–11–7
- Road record: 6–22–7
- Goals for: 184
- Goals against: 219

Team information
- General manager: Jack Adams
- Coach: Sid Abel
- Captain: Gordie Howe
- Alternate captains: Alex Delvecchio; Bill Gadsby; Marcel Pronovost
- Arena: Detroit Olympia

Team leaders
- Goals: Gordie Howe (33)
- Assists: Gordie Howe (44)
- Points: Gordie Howe (77)
- Penalty minutes: Bill Gadsby (88)
- Wins: Terry Sawchuk (14)
- Goals against average: Hank Bassen (2.78)

The 1961–62 NHL season was the 36th season for the Detroit Red Wings. The team missed the playoffs for the first time since the 1958–59 season

== Regular season ==
=== Final standings ===
National Hockey League
		GP	W	L	T	GF	GA	DIFF	Pts
1	Montreal Canadiens	70	42	14	14	259	166	+93	98
2	Toronto Maple Leafs	70	37	22	11	232	180	+52	85
3	Chicago Black Hawks	70	31	26	13	217	186	+31	75
4	New York Rangers	70	26	32	12	195	207	−12	64
5	Detroit Red Wings	70	23	33	14	184	219	−35	60
6	Boston Bruins	70	15	47	8	177	306	−129	38

=== Record vs. opponents ===
1961–62 NHL Records
Team	BOS	CHI	DET	MTL	NYR	TOR
Boston	—	2–10–2	4–8–2	3–10–1	2–10–2	4–9–1
Chicago	10–2–2	—	7–3–4	3–9–2	7–6–1	4–6–4
Detroit	8–4–2	3–7–4	—	3–8–3	6–5–3	3–9–2
Montreal	10–3–1	9–3–2	8–3–3	—	8–1–5	7–4–3
New York	10–2–2	6–7–1	5–6–3	1–8–5	—	4–9–1
Toronto	9–4–1	6–4–4	9–3–2	4–7–3	9–4–1	—

== Schedule and results ==
1961–62 regular season
October

Game	Result	Date	Score	Opponent	Record
1	L	October 12, 1961	2–4	Toronto Maple Leafs (1961–62)	0–1–0
2	T	October 14, 1961	3–3	Chicago Black Hawks (1961–62)	0–1–1
3	T	October 15, 1961	2–2	@ Chicago Black Hawks (1961–62)	0–1–2
4	W	October 19, 1961	7–3	Boston Bruins (1961–62)	1–1–2
5	T	October 21, 1961	4–4	New York Rangers (1961–62)	1–1–3
6	W	October 22, 1961	5–4	@ New York Rangers (1961–62)	2–1–3
7	L	October 26, 1961	0–4	@ Boston Bruins (1961–62)	2–2–3
8	L	October 28, 1961	5–7	@ Montreal Canadiens (1961–62)	2–3–3
9	L	October 29, 1961	3–6	Montreal Canadiens (1961–62)	2–4–3

November

Game	Result	Date	Score	Opponent	Record
10	W	November 2, 1961	1–0	New York Rangers (1961–62)	3–4–3
11	L	November 5, 1961	2–3	Toronto Maple Leafs (1961–62)	3–5–3
12	W	November 9, 1961	2–1	Boston Bruins (1961–62)	4–5–3
13	L	November 11, 1961	1–5	@ Toronto Maple Leafs (1961–62)	4–6–3
14	W	November 12, 1961	3–0	Montreal Canadiens (1961–62)	5–6–3
15	L	November 15, 1961	0–2	@ Chicago Black Hawks (1961–62)	5–7–3
16	L	November 18, 1961	1–6	@ Toronto Maple Leafs (1961–62)	5–8–3
17	W	November 19, 1961	6–2	@ Boston Bruins (1961–62)	6–8–3
18	L	November 22, 1961	0–4	@ New York Rangers (1961–62)	6–9–3
19	L	November 23, 1961	3–5	@ Montreal Canadiens (1961–62)	6–10–3
20	L	November 26, 1961	1–4	@ Chicago Black Hawks (1961–62)	6–11–3
21	W	November 30, 1961	3–1	Boston Bruins (1961–62)	7–11–3

December

Game	Result	Date	Score	Opponent	Record
22	L	December 2, 1961	2–3	@ Montreal Canadiens (1961–62)	7–12–3
23	W	December 3, 1961	3–1	Toronto Maple Leafs (1961–62)	8–12–3
24	T	December 7, 1961	3–3	New York Rangers (1961–62)	8–12–4
25	W	December 9, 1961	3–0	Chicago Black Hawks (1961–62)	9–12–4
26	W	December 10, 1961	3–2	@ Chicago Black Hawks (1961–62)	10–12–4
27	W	December 14, 1961	5–0	Boston Bruins (1961–62)	11–12–4
28	W	December 17, 1961	3–1	Montreal Canadiens (1961–62)	12–12–4
29	L	December 20, 1961	1–6	@ New York Rangers (1961–62)	12–13–4
30	L	December 21, 1961	2–4	@ Boston Bruins (1961–62)	12–14–4
31	L	December 23, 1961	1–6	@ Montreal Canadiens (1961–62)	12–15–4
32	L	December 25, 1961	4–6	New York Rangers (1961–62)	12–16–4
33	T	December 28, 1961	2–2	Chicago Black Hawks (1961–62)	12–16–5
34	L	December 30, 1961	4–6	@ Toronto Maple Leafs (1961–62)	12–17–5
35	W	December 31, 1961	4–2	Toronto Maple Leafs (1961–62)	13–17–5

January

Game	Result	Date	Score	Opponent	Record
36	T	January 4, 1962	1–1	Chicago Black Hawks (1961–62)	13–17–6
37	W	January 6, 1962	6–2	Boston Bruins (1961–62)	14–17–6
38	T	January 7, 1962	2–2	Montreal Canadiens (1961–62)	14–17–7
39	L	January 13, 1962	3–4	@ Toronto Maple Leafs (1961–62)	14–18–7
40	W	January 14, 1962	2–1	New York Rangers (1961–62)	15–18–7
41	L	January 18, 1962	3–5	@ Boston Bruins (1961–62)	15–19–7
42	T	January 20, 1962	2–2	@ Montreal Canadiens (1961–62)	15–19–8
43	L	January 21, 1962	3–5	Montreal Canadiens (1961–62)	15–20–8
44	W	January 24, 1962	3–0	@ New York Rangers (1961–62)	16–20–8
45	L	January 27, 1962	2–4	@ Toronto Maple Leafs (1961–62)	16–21–8
46	T	January 28, 1962	2–2	Toronto Maple Leafs (1961–62)	16–21–9
47	L	January 31, 1962	1–4	@ Chicago Black Hawks (1961–62)	16–22–9

February

Game	Result	Date	Score	Opponent	Record
48	L	February 1, 1962	4–7	Chicago Black Hawks (1961–62)	16–23–9
49	L	February 3, 1962	1–8	@ Montreal Canadiens (1961–62)	16–24–9
50	W	February 4, 1962	6–0	Boston Bruins (1961–62)	17–24–9
51	T	February 7, 1962	2–2	@ New York Rangers (1961–62)	17–24–10
52	T	February 10, 1962	2–2	@ Boston Bruins (1961–62)	17–24–11
53	W	February 11, 1962	5–0	Toronto Maple Leafs (1961–62)	18–24–11
54	W	February 15, 1962	4–3	New York Rangers (1961–62)	19–24–11
55	W	February 18, 1962	4–2	Montreal Canadiens (1961–62)	20–24–11
56	L	February 21, 1962	4–6	@ Chicago Black Hawks (1961–62)	20–25–11
57	L	February 24, 1962	1–6	Chicago Black Hawks (1961–62)	20–26–11
58	L	February 25, 1962	2–8	Toronto Maple Leafs (1961–62)	20–27–11

March

Game	Result	Date	Score	Opponent	Record
59	T	March 3, 1962	2–2	@ Montreal Canadiens (1961–62)	20–27–12
60	W	March 4, 1962	4–2	@ New York Rangers (1961–62)	21–27–12
61	L	March 6, 1962	4–5	New York Rangers (1961–62)	21–28–12
62	W	March 8, 1962	3–0	@ Boston Bruins (1961–62)	22–28–12
63	L	March 10, 1962	0–2	@ Toronto Maple Leafs (1961–62)	22–29–12
64	T	March 11, 1962	2–2	@ Boston Bruins (1961–62)	22–29–13
65	L	March 14, 1962	2–3	@ New York Rangers (1961–62)	22–30–13
66	L	March 15, 1962	0–4	Boston Bruins (1961–62)	22–31–13
67	W	March 18, 1962	4–1	Chicago Black Hawks (1961–62)	23–31–13
68	L	March 20, 1962	0–3	@ Chicago Black Hawks (1961–62)	23–32–13
69	T	March 24, 1962	2–2	@ Toronto Maple Leafs (1961–62)	23–32–14
70	L	March 25, 1962	2–5	Montreal Canadiens (1961–62)	23–33–14

Legend: Win (2 points) Loss (0 points) Tie (1 point)

== Player statistics ==
=== Regular season ===
Scoring

Player	Pos	GP	G	A	Pts	PIM
Gordie Howe	RW	70	33	44	77	54
Alex Delvecchio	C/LW	70	26	43	69	18
Norm Ullman	C	70	26	38	64	54
Vic Stasiuk	LW	59	15	28	43	45
Bill Gadsby	D	70	7	30	37	88
Ed Litzenberger	C/RW	32	8	12	20	4
Claude Laforge	LW	38	10	9	19	20
Bruce MacGregor	C	65	6	12	18	16
Marcel Pronovost	D	70	4	14	18	38
Warren Godfrey	D	69	4	13	17	84
Howie Glover	RW	39	7	8	15	44
Parker MacDonald	C	32	5	7	12	8
Marc Boileau	C	54	5	6	11	8
Allan Johnson	RW/C	31	5	6	11	14
Len Lunde	C	23	2	9	11	4
Val Fonteyne	LW	70	5	5	10	4
Pete Goegan	D	39	5	5	10	24
Larry Jeffrey	LW	18	5	3	8	20
Leo Labine	RW	48	3	4	7	30
Gerry Odrowski	D	69	1	6	7	24
Howie Young	D/RW	30	0	2	2	67
Chuck Holmes	RW	8	1	0	1	4
Forbes Kennedy	C	14	1	0	1	8
Pit Martin	C	1	0	1	1	0
Noel Price	D	20	0	1	1	6
Hank Bassen	G	27	0	0	0	8
Bob Dillabough	C	5	0	0	0	2
Jack Hendrickson	D	1	0	0	0	2
Lowell MacDonald	LW	1	0	0	0	2
Wayne Rivers	RW	2	0	0	0	0
Terry Sawchuk	G	43	0	0	0	12

Goaltending

Player	MIN	GP	W	L	T	GA	GAA	SO
Terry Sawchuk	2580	43	14	21	8	141	3.28	5
Hank Bassen	1620	27	9	12	6	75	2.78	3
Team:	4200	70	23	33	14	216	3.09	8

Note: GP = Games played; G = Goals; A = Assists; Pts = Points; +/- = Plus-minus PIM = Penalty minutes; PPG = Power-play goals; SHG = Short-handed goals; GWG = Game-winning goals;
MIN = Minutes played; W = Wins; L = Losses; T = Ties; GA = Goals against; GAA = Goals-against average; SO = Shutouts;

== See also ==
- 1961–62 NHL season
- 1962 in Michigan
