= 1961–62 Chicago Black Hawks season =

National Hockey League team season

1961–62 Chicago Black Hawks
- League: 3rd NHL
- 1961–62 record: 31–26–13
- Home record: 20–10–5
- Road record: 11–16–8
- Goals for: 217
- Goals against: 186

Team information
- General manager: Tommy Ivan
- Coach: Rudy Pilous
- Captain: Pierre Pilote
- Arena: Chicago Stadium

Team leaders
- Goals: Bobby Hull (50)
- Assists: Stan Mikita and Bill Hay (52)
- Points: Bobby Hull (84)
- Penalty minutes: Eric Nesterenko, Pierre Pilote and Stan Mikita (97)
- Wins: Glenn Hall (31)
- Goals against average: Glenn Hall (2.63)

The 1961–62 Chicago Black Hawks season was the Hawks' 36th season in the NHL, and the club was coming off of a third-place finish in 1960–61, as they finished with a 29–24–17 record, earning 75 points, which was a franchise record, and the first time since 1946 that the Hawks had an over .500 record.

During the off-season, the Black Hawks traded away team captain Ed Litzenberger to the Detroit Red Wings in exchange for Gerry Melnyk and Brian Smith. Chicago also had some problems signing some of their players, as Stan Mikita, Reg Fleming, and Dollard St. Laurent all refused to sign their contracts, however, they all eventually came to terms. With Litzenberger traded away, the team named defenseman Pierre Pilote as the new captain.

The defending champions started off the season slow, earning only one win in their first eleven games, as they had a record of 1–5–5, however, the team rebounded, and put together a 16–12–8 record in the next 36 games to get to the .500 level. The Black Hawks then got hot, as they then won six games in a row, followed shortly by a four-game winning streak, as the team managed to finish the season with a 31–26–13 record, tying a club record with 75 points, and setting a team record for wins in a season at 31, which was two more than the previous high of 29 set the previous season.

Offensively, Chicago was led by Bobby Hull, who set a team record with 50 goals and 84 points. He became the third player in NHL history, Maurice Richard and Bernie Geoffrion were the others, to score 50 goals in a season. Hull's 84 points tied him with Andy Bathgate of the New York Rangers for the league lead, however, since Hull scored more goals, he was awarded the Art Ross Trophy. Stan Mikita emerged as an offensive force, breaking out with a team high 52 assists and 77 points, while Bill Hay also recorded 52 assists en route to a 63-point season. Pierre Pilote led the Hawks blueline, scoring 7 goals and 42 points, while tying Mikita and Eric Nesterenko for the most penalty minutes on the team, with 97.

In goal, Glenn Hall once again played in all 70 games, setting a team record for wins with 31, and posting a 2.63 GAA, along with 9 shutouts.

Chicago would face the Montreal Canadiens in the best of seven NHL semi-final for the fourth consecutive season. The Canadiens were once again heavily favored to defeat the Hawks, as they had an NHL best 98 points, which was 23 more than Chicago. Montreal opened the series off by winning the opening two games at the Montreal Forum by scores of 2–1 and 4–3 to take an early 2–0 series lead, however, as the series shifted over to Chicago Stadium, the Black Hawks took advantage, winning the next two games by scores of 4–1 and 5–3 to even up the series. The fifth game was back in Montreal, however, Chicago stayed hot, and narrowly defeated the Canadiens 4–3 to return home with a 3–2 series lead. The Hawks again took advantage of their home ice, shutting out the Canadiens 2–0, and eliminating Montreal for the second straight season, and earning a spot in the finals.

Chicago would face the Toronto Maple Leafs in the 1962 Stanley Cup Finals. The Leafs had a strong regular season, earning 85 points, and had defeated the fourth place New York Rangers to clinch a spot in the finals. The series opened at Maple Leaf Gardens in Toronto, and much like their previous series against the Canadiens, the Black Hawks quickly found themselves down 2–0, as Toronto won the first two games by scores of 4–1 and 3–2. The next two games were held in Chicago, and the Black Hawks continued their home ice winning streak, taking the two games by scores of 3–0 and 4–1 to pull even. The clubs were back in Toronto for the fifth game, and it was the Maple Leafs easily beating Chicago 8–4 to take a 3–2 series lead. Toronto ended Chicago's five game home winning streak in the sixth game, holding off Chicago for a 2–1 win, and ending the Hawks chance of a second straight championship.

== Season standings ==
National Hockey League
		GP	W	L	T	GF	GA	DIFF	Pts
1	Montreal Canadiens	70	42	14	14	259	166	+93	98
2	Toronto Maple Leafs	70	37	22	11	232	180	+52	85
3	Chicago Black Hawks	70	31	26	13	217	186	+31	75
4	New York Rangers	70	26	32	12	195	207	−12	64
5	Detroit Red Wings	70	23	33	14	184	219	−35	60
6	Boston Bruins	70	15	47	8	177	306	−129	38

=== Record vs. opponents ===
1961–62 NHL Records
Team	BOS	CHI	DET	MTL	NYR	TOR
Boston	—	2–10–2	4–8–2	3–10–1	2–10–2	4–9–1
Chicago	10–2–2	—	7–3–4	3–9–2	7–6–1	4–6–4
Detroit	8–4–2	3–7–4	—	3–8–3	6–5–3	3–9–2
Montreal	10–3–1	9–3–2	8–3–3	—	8–1–5	7–4–3
New York	10–2–2	6–7–1	5–6–3	1–8–5	—	4–9–1
Toronto	9–4–1	6–4–4	9–3–2	4–7–3	9–4–1	—

== Schedule and results ==
=== Regular season ===
1961–62 regular season
October: 1–4–5 (home: 1–2–1; road: 0–2–4), 7 points

Game	Result	Date	Opponent	Score	Record	Points
1	T	October 14, 1961	@ Detroit Red Wings (1961–62)	3–3	0–0–1	1
2	T	October 15, 1961	Detroit Red Wings (1961–62)	2–2	0–0–2	2
3	W	October 17, 1961	Boston Bruins (1961–62)	5–3	1–0–2	4
4	L	October 19, 1961	New York Rangers (1961–62)	4–2	1–1–2	4
5	T	October 21, 1961	@ Toronto Maple Leafs (1961–62)	1–1	1–1–3	5
6	L	October 22, 1961	Montreal Canadiens (1961–62)	2–3	1–2–3	5
7	T	October 25, 1961	@ New York Rangers (1961–62)	1–1	1–2–4	6
8	L	October 26, 1961	@ Montreal Canadiens (1961–62)	1–7	1–3–4	6
9	T	October 29, 1961	@ Boston Bruins (1961–62)	2–2	1–3–5	7
10	L	October 31	New York Rangers (1961–62)	2–4	1–4–5	7

November: 5–4–1 (home: 4–1–1; road: 1–3–0), 11 points

Game	Result	Date	Opponent	Score	Record	Points
11	L	November 4, 1961	@ Toronto Maple Leafs (1961–62)	1–2	1–5–5	7
12	W	November 5, 1961	@ Boston Bruins (1961–62)	4–3	2–5–5	9
13	W	November 7, 1961	Toronto Maple Leafs (1961–62)	6–0	3–5–5	11
14	L	November 11, 1961	@ Montreal Canadiens (1961–62)	1–2	3–6–5	11
15	L	November 12, 1961	@ New York Rangers (1961–62)	1–4	3–7–5	11
16	W	November 15, 1961	Detroit Red Wings (1961–62)	2–0	4–7–5	13
17	T	November 19, 1961	Montreal Canadiens (1961–62)	3–3	4–7–6	14
18	L	November 23, 1961	Toronto Maple Leafs (1961–62)	2–5	4–8–6	14
19	W	November 26, 1961	Detroit Red Wings (1961–62)	4–1	5–8–6	16
20	W	November 29, 1961	Boston Bruins (1961–62)	7–4	6–8–6	18

December: 4–5–5 (home: 0–2–2; road: 4–3–3), 13 points

Game	Result	Date	Opponent	Score	Record	Points
21	L	December 2, 1961	@ Toronto Maple Leafs (1961–62)	4–6	6–9–6	18
22	L	December 3, 1961	Montreal Canadiens (1961–62)	0–1	6–10–6	18
23	W	December 6, 1961	@ New York Rangers (1961–62)	8–3	7–10–6	20
24	W	December 7, 1961	@ Boston Bruins (1961–62)	5–2	8–10–6	22
25	L	December 9, 1961	@ Detroit Red Wings (1961–62)	0–3	8–11–6	22
26	L	December 10, 1961	Detroit Red Wings (1961–62)	2–3	8–12–6	22
27	T	December 13, 1961	Boston Bruins (1961–62)	2–2	8–12–7	23
28	W	December 17, 1961	New York Rangers (1961–62)	3–1	9–12–7	25
29	W	December 21, 1961	@ Montreal Canadiens (1961–62)	4–3	10–12–7	27
30	L	December 23, 1961	@ New York Rangers (1961–62)	3–7	10–13–7	27
31	T	December 25, 1961	Toronto Maple Leafs (1961–62)	3–3	10–13–8	28
32	T	December 27, 1961	@ Toronto Maple Leafs (1961–62)	0–0	10–13–9	29
33	T	December 28, 1961	@ Detroit Red Wings (1961–62)	2–2	10–13–10	30
34	T	December 30, 1961	@ Montreal Canadiens (1961–62)	4–4	10–13–11	31

January: 7–4–2 (home: 6–2–1; road: 1–2–1), 16 points

Game	Result	Date	Opponent	Score	Record	Points	
35	W	January 1, 1962	Montreal Canadiens (1961–62)	2–0	11–13–11	33	
36	W	January 3, 1962	New York Rangers (1961–62)	2–1	12–13–11	35	
37	T	January 4, 1962	@ Detroit Red Wings (1961–62)	1–1	12–13–12	36	
38	L	January 6, 1962	@ Toronto Maple Leafs (1961–62)	3–6	12–14–12	36	
39	L	January 7, 1962	Boston Bruins (1961–62)	0–2	12–15–12	36	
40	W	January 11, 1962	@ Boston Bruins (1961–62)	6–0	13–15–12	38	
41	W	January 13, 1962	New York Rangers (1961–62)	4–2	14–15–12	40	
42	T	January 14, 1962	Toronto Maple Leafs (1961–62)	2–2	14–15–13	41	
43	L	January 17, 1962	Montreal Canadiens (1961–62)	3–7	14–16–13	41	
44	W	January 21, 1962	New York Rangers (1961–62)	3–1	15–16–13	43	
45	W	January 24, 1962	Toronto Maple Leafs (1961–62)	2–1	16–16–13	45	
46	L	January 27, 1962	@ Boston Bruins (1961–62)	3–5	16–17–13	45	
47	W	January 28, 1962	@ New York Rangers (1961–62)	3–0		17–17–13	47
48	W	January 31, 1962	Detroit Red Wings (1961–62)	4–1	18–17–13	49	

February: 9–4–0 (home: 6–1–0; road: 3–3–0), 18 points

Game	Result	Date	Opponent	Score	Record	Points
49	W	February 1, 1962	@ Detroit Red Wings (1961–62)	7–4	19–17–13	51
50	W	February 3, 1962	Boston Bruins (1961–62)	6–3	20–17–13	53
51	W	February 4, 1962	Toronto Maple Leafs (1961–62)	2–1	21–17–13	55
52	W	February 8, 1962	@ Boston Bruins (1961–62)	6–2	22–17–13	57
53	L	February 10, 1962	@ New York Rangers (1961–62)	1–2	22–18–13	57
54	L	February 11, 1962	Montreal Canadiens (1961–62)	3–4	22–19–13	57
55	W	February 14, 1962	New York Rangers (1961–62)	4–3	23–19–13	59
56	L	February 17, 1962	@ Montreal Canadiens (1961–62)	2–6	23–20–13	59
57	W	February 18, 1962	Boston Bruins (1961–62)	6–0	24–20–13	61
58	W	February 21, 1962	Detroit Red Wings (1961–62)	6–4	25–20–13	63
59	W	February 24, 1962	@ Detroit Red Wings (1961–62)	6–1	26–20–13	65
60	W	February 25, 1962	Boston Bruins (1961–62)	8–0	27–20–13	67
61	L	February 28, 1962	@ Toronto Maple Leafs (1961–62)	2–4	27–21–13	67

March: 4–4–0 (home: 2–1–0; road: 2–3–0), 8 points

Game	Result	Date	Opponent	Score	Record	Points
62	W	March 1, 1962	@ Boston Bruins (1961–62)	5–4	28–21–13	69
63	W	March 4, 1962	Montreal Canadiens (1961–62)	5–2	29–21–13	71
64	L	March 11, 1962	Toronto Maple Leafs (1961–62)	2–3	29–22–13	71
65	L	March 15, 1962	@ Montreal Canadiens (1961–62)	5–6	29–23–13	71
66	W	March 17, 1962	@ Toronto Maple Leafs (1961–62)	3–1	30–23–13	73
67	L	March 18, 1962	@ Detroit Red Wings (1961–62)	1–4	30–24–13	73
68	W	March 20, 1962	Detroit Red Wings (1961–62)	3–0	31–24–13	75
69	L	March 24, 1962	@ Montreal Canadiens (1961–62)	3–5	31–25–13	75
70	L	March 25, 1962	@ New York Rangers (1961–62)	1–4	31–26–13	75

Legend: Win (2 points) Loss (0 points) Tie (1 point)

=== Playoffs ===
1962 Stanley Cup playoffs
Semifinals vs. (1) Montreal Canadiens – Black Hawks win 4–2

Game	Result	Date	Opponent	Score	OT	Series
1	L	March 27, 1962	@ Montreal Canadiens (1961–62)	1–2		0–1
2	L	March 29, 1962	@ Montreal Canadiens (1961–62)	3–4		0–2
3	W	April 1, 1962	Montreal Canadiens (1961–62)	4–1		1–2
4	W	April 3, 1962	Montreal Canadiens (1961–62)	5–3		2–2
5	W	April 5, 1962	@ Montreal Canadiens (1961–62)	4–3		3–2
6	W	April 8, 1962	Montreal Canadiens (1961–62)	2–0		4–2

Stanley Cup Finals vs. (2) Toronto Maple Leafs – Maple Leafs win 4–2

Game	Result	Date	Opponent	Score	OT	Series
1	L	April 10, 1962	@ Toronto Maple Leafs (1961–62)	1–4		0–1
2	L	April 12, 1962	@ Toronto Maple Leafs (1961–62)	2–3		0–2
3	W	April 15, 1962	Toronto Maple Leafs (1961–62)	3–0		1–2
4	W	April 17, 1962	Toronto Maple Leafs (1961–62)	4–1		2–2
5	L	April 19, 1962	@ Toronto Maple Leafs (1961–62)	4–8		2–3
6	L	April 22, 1962	Toronto Maple Leafs (1961–62)	1–2		2–4

Legend: Win Loss

== Season stats ==
=== Scoring leaders ===
Player	GP	G	A	Pts	PIM
Bobby Hull	70	50	34	84	35
Stan Mikita	70	25	52	77	97
Bill Hay	60	11	52	63	34
Bronco Horvath	68	17	29	46	21
Pierre Pilote	59	7	35	42	97

=== Goaltending ===
Player	GP	TOI	W	L	T	GA	SO	GAA
Glenn Hall	70	4200	31	26	13	184	9	2.63

== Playoff stats ==
=== Scoring leaders ===
Player	GP	G	A	Pts	PIM
Stan Mikita	12	6	15	21	19
Bobby Hull	12	8	6	14	12
Ab McDonald	12	6	6	12	0
Bill Hay	12	3	7	10	18
Kenny Wharram	12	3	4	7	8

=== Goaltending ===
Player	GP	TOI	W	L	GA	SO	GAA
Glenn Hall	12	720	6	6	31	2	2.58

== Sources ==
- Hockey-Reference
- Rauzulu's Street
- Goalies Archive
- National Hockey League Guide & Record Book 2007
