= 1961–62 Toronto Maple Leafs season =

NHL hockey team season (won Stanley Cup)

1961–62 Toronto Maple Leafs
- Stanley Cup champions
- League: 2nd NHL
- 1961–62 record: 37–22–11
- Home record: 25–5–5
- Road record: 12–17–6
- Goals for: 232
- Goals against: 180

Team information
- General manager: Punch Imlach
- Coach: Punch Imlach
- Captain: George Armstrong
- Alternate captains: Dick Duff; Bert Olmstead
- Arena: Maple Leaf Gardens

Team leaders
- Goals: Frank Mahovlich (33)
- Assists: Frank Mahovlich (38)
- Points: Frank Mahovlich (71)
- Penalty minutes: Bob Pulford (98)
- Wins: Johnny Bower (31)
- Goals against average: Don Simmons (2.33)

The 1961–62 Toronto Maple Leafs season saw the Leafs finish in second place in the National Hockey League (NHL) with a record of 37 wins, 22 losses, and 11 ties for 85 points. They made the playoffs for the fourth year in a row, where they ousted the New York Rangers in six games in the Semi-finals before defeating the defending champion Chicago Black Hawks, also in six games, to win their first Stanley Cup championship since 1951. It would be the first of three straight Stanley Cup titles for the team, and four overall during the decade of the 1960s.

== Regular season ==
=== Season standings ===
National Hockey League
		GP	W	L	T	GF	GA	DIFF	Pts
1	Montreal Canadiens	70	42	14	14	259	166	+93	98
2	Toronto Maple Leafs	70	37	22	11	232	180	+52	85
3	Chicago Black Hawks	70	31	26	13	217	186	+31	75
4	New York Rangers	70	26	32	12	195	207	−12	64
5	Detroit Red Wings	70	23	33	14	184	219	−35	60
6	Boston Bruins	70	15	47	8	177	306	−129	38

=== Record vs. opponents ===
1961–62 NHL Records
Team	BOS	CHI	DET	MTL	NYR	TOR
Boston	—	2–10–2	4–8–2	3–10–1	2–10–2	4–9–1
Chicago	10–2–2	—	7–3–4	3–9–2	7–6–1	4–6–4
Detroit	8–4–2	3–7–4	—	3–8–3	6–5–3	3–9–2
Montreal	10–3–1	9–3–2	8–3–3	—	8–1–5	7–4–3
New York	10–2–2	6–7–1	5–6–3	1–8–5	—	4–9–1
Toronto	9–4–1	6–4–4	9–3–2	4–7–3	9–4–1	—

== Schedule and results ==
1961–62 regular season
October: 4–2–1 (home: 2–0–1; road: 2–2–0)

Game	Result	Date	Score	Opponent	Record	Pts	Recap
1	W	October 12, 1961	4–2	@ Detroit Red Wings (1961–62)	1–0–0	2	W1
2	W	October 14, 1961	3–2	Boston Bruins (1961–62)	2–0–0	4	W2
3	L	October 15, 1961	1–2	@ New York Rangers (1961–62)	2–1–0	4	L1
4	T	October 21, 1961	1–1	Chicago Black Hawks (1961–62)	2–1–1	5	T1
5	W	October 22, 1961	9–1	@ Boston Bruins (1961–62)	3–1–1	7	W1
6	W	October 28, 1961	5–1	New York Rangers (1961–62)	4–1–1	9	W2
7	L	October 29, 1961	2–4	@ New York Rangers (1961–62)	4–2–1	9	L1

November: 9–4–2 (home: 6–0–1; road: 3–4–1)

Game	Result	Date	Score	Opponent	Record	Pts	Recap
8	W	November 1, 1961	3–2	Montreal Canadiens (1961–62)	5–2–1	11	W1
9	W	November 4, 1961	2–1	Chicago Black Hawks (1961–62)	6–2–1	13	W2
10	W	November 5, 1961	3–2	@ Detroit Red Wings (1961–62)	7–2–1	15	W3
11	L	November 7, 1961	0–6	@ Chicago Black Hawks (1961–62)	7–3–1	15	L1
12	L	November 9, 1961	2–5	@ Montreal Canadiens (1961–62)	7–4–1	15	L2
13	W	November 11, 1961	5–1	Detroit Red Wings (1961–62)	8–4–1	17	W1
14	L	November 12, 1961	3–4	@ Boston Bruins (1961–62)	8–5–1	17	L1
15	W	November 15, 1961	3–2	Montreal Canadiens (1961–62)	9–5–1	19	W1
16	W	November 18, 1961	6–1	Detroit Red Wings (1961–62)	10–5–1	21	W2
17	L	November 19, 1961	3–5	@ New York Rangers (1961–62)	10–6–1	21	L1
18	W	November 23, 1961	5–2	@ Chicago Black Hawks (1961–62)	11–6–1	23	W1
19	W	November 25, 1961	6–0	New York Rangers (1961–62)	12–6–1	25	W2
20	W	November 26, 1961	4–1	@ Boston Bruins (1961–62)	13–6–1	27	W3
21	T	November 29, 1961	2–2	Montreal Canadiens (1961–62)	13–6–2	28	T1
22	T	November 30, 1961	1–1	@ Montreal Canadiens (1961–62)	13–6–3	29	T2

December: 6–4–2 (home: 4–1–1; road: 2–3–1)

Game	Result	Date	Score	Opponent	Record	Pts	Recap
23	W	December 2, 1961	6–4	Chicago Black Hawks (1961–62)	14–6–3	31	W1
24	L	December 3, 1961	1–3	@ Detroit Red Wings (1961–62)	14–7–3	31	L1
25	L	December 7, 1961	1–4	@ Montreal Canadiens (1961–62)	14–8–3	31	L2
26	W	December 9, 1961	9–2	Boston Bruins (1961–62)	15–8–3	33	W1
27	W	December 10, 1961	3–2	@ New York Rangers (1961–62)	16–8–3	35	W2
28	W	December 16, 1961	4–2	New York Rangers (1961–62)	17–8–3	37	W3
29	W	December 17, 1961	4–1	@ Boston Bruins (1961–62)	18–8–3	39	W4
30	L	December 23, 1961	4–7	Boston Bruins (1961–62)	18–9–3	39	L1
31	T	December 25, 1961	3–3	@ Chicago Black Hawks (1961–62)	18–9–4	40	T1
32	T	December 27, 1961	0–0	Chicago Black Hawks (1961–62)	18–9–5	41	T2
33	W	December 30, 1961	6–4	Detroit Red Wings (1961–62)	19–9–5	43	W1
34	L	December 31, 1961	2–4	@ Detroit Red Wings (1961–62)	19–10–5	43	L1

January: 8–3–2 (home: 6–1–0; road: 2–2–2)

Game	Result	Date	Score	Opponent	Record	Pts	Recap
35	W	January 3, 1962	3–1	Montreal Canadiens (1961–62)	20–10–5	45	W1
36	W	January 6, 1962	6–3	Chicago Black Hawks (1961–62)	21–10–5	47	W2
37	W	January 7, 1962	4–3	@ New York Rangers (1961–62)	22–10–5	49	W3
38	W	January 10, 1962	7–5	Boston Bruins (1961–62)	23–10–5	51	W4
39	L	January 11, 1962	2–4	@ Montreal Canadiens (1961–62)	23–11–5	51	L1
40	W	January 13, 1962	4–3	Detroit Red Wings (1961–62)	24–11–5	53	W1
41	T	January 14, 1962	2–2	@ Chicago Black Hawks (1961–62)	24–11–6	54	T1
42	W	January 17, 1962	4–2	New York Rangers (1961–62)	25–11–6	56	W1
43	L	January 20, 1962	4–5	Boston Bruins (1961–62)	25–12–6	56	L1
44	W	January 21, 1962	5–1	@ Boston Bruins (1961–62)	26–12–6	58	W1
45	L	January 24, 1962	1–2	@ Chicago Black Hawks (1961–62)	26–13–6	58	L1
46	W	January 27, 1962	4–2	Detroit Red Wings (1961–62)	27–13–6	60	W1
47	T	January 28, 1962	2–2	@ Detroit Red Wings (1961–62)	27–13–7	61	T1

February: 5–6–1 (home: 4–2–1; road: 1–4–0)

Game	Result	Date	Score	Opponent	Record	Pts	Recap
48	L	February 1, 1962	2–5	@ Montreal Canadiens (1961–62)	27–14–7	61	L1
49	W	February 3, 1962	4–1	New York Rangers (1961–62)	28–14–7	63	W1
50	L	February 4, 1962	1–2	@ Chicago Black Hawks (1961–62)	28–15–7	63	L1
51	T	February 7, 1962	2–2	Boston Bruins (1961–62)	28–15–8	64	T1
52	L	February 10, 1962	2–4	Montreal Canadiens (1961–62)	28–16–8	64	L1
53	L	February 11, 1962	0–5	@ Detroit Red Wings (1961–62)	28–17–8	64	L2
54	W	February 17, 1962	5–3	New York Rangers (1961–62)	29–17–8	66	W1
55	L	February 18, 1962	2–6	@ New York Rangers (1961–62)	29–18–8	66	L1
56	L	February 21, 1962	2–4	Montreal Canadiens (1961–62)	29–19–8	66	L2
57	W	February 24, 1962	7–2	Boston Bruins (1961–62)	30–19–8	68	W1
58	W	February 25, 1962	8–2	@ Detroit Red Wings (1961–62)	31–19–8	70	W2
59	W	February 28, 1962	4–2	Chicago Black Hawks (1961–62)	32–19–8	72	W3

March: 5–3–3 (home: 3–1–1; road: 2–2–2)

Game	Result	Date	Score	Opponent	Record	Pts	Recap
60	W	March 3, 1962	3–1	New York Rangers (1961–62)	33–19–8	74	W4
61	W	March 4, 1962	5–1	@ Boston Bruins (1961–62)	34–19–8	76	W5
62	T	March 8, 1962	1–1	@ Montreal Canadiens (1961–62)	34–19–9	77	T1
63	W	March 10, 1962	2–0	Detroit Red Wings (1961–62)	35–19–9	79	W1
64	W	March 11, 1962	3–2	@ Chicago Black Hawks (1961–62)	36–19–9	81	W2
65	W	March 14, 1962	5–2	Montreal Canadiens (1961–62)	37–19–9	83	W3
66	L	March 17, 1962	1–3	Chicago Black Hawks (1961–62)	37–20–9	83	L1
67	T	March 18, 1962	2–2	@ New York Rangers (1961–62)	37–20–10	84	T1
68	L	March 22, 1962	1–4	@ Montreal Canadiens (1961–62)	37–21–10	84	L1
69	T	March 24, 1962	2–2	Detroit Red Wings (1961–62)	37–21–11	85	T1
70	L	March 25, 1962	4–5	@ Boston Bruins (1961–62)	37–22–11	85	L1

Legend: Win (2 points) Loss (0 points) Tie (1 point)

== Playoffs ==
The Toronto Maple Leafs won the Stanley Cup for the 10th time in franchise history and the first Stanley Cup since 1951 after defeating the New York Rangers 4–2 in the Stanley Cup Semifinals and the Chicago Black Hawks 4–2 in the Stanley Cup Finals.

1962 Stanley Cup playoffs
Semifinals vs. (4) New York Rangers – Maple Leafs win 4–2

Game	Result	Date	Score	OT	Opponent	Series	Recap
1	W	March 27, 1962	4–2		New York Rangers (1961–62)	1–0	W1
2	W	March 29, 1962	2–1		New York Rangers (1961–62)	2–0	W2
3	L	April 1, 1962	4–5		@ New York Rangers (1961–62)	2–1	L1
4	L	April 3, 1962	2–4		@ New York Rangers (1961–62)	2–2	L2
5	W	April 5, 1962	3–2	2OT	New York Rangers (1961–62)	3–2	W1
6	W	April 7, 1962	7–1		New York Rangers (1961–62)	4–2	W2

Stanley Cup Finals vs. (3) Chicago Black Hawks – Maple Leafs win 4–2

Game	Result	Date	Score	OT	Opponent	Series	Recap
1	W	April 10, 1962	4–1		Chicago Black Hawks (1961–62)	1–0	W1
2	W	April 12, 1962	3–2		Chicago Black Hawks (1961–62)	2–0	W2
3	L	April 15, 1962	0–3		@ Chicago Black Hawks (1961–62)	2–1	L1
4	L	April 17, 1962	1–4		@ Chicago Black Hawks (1961–62)	2–2	L2
5	W	April 19, 1962	8–4		Chicago Black Hawks (1961–62)	3–2	W1
6	W	April 22, 1962	2–1		@ Chicago Black Hawks (1961–62)	4–2	W2

Legend: Win Loss

== Player statistics ==
=== Forwards ===
Note: GP= Games played; G= Goals; AST= Assists; PTS = Points; PIM = Points

Player	GP	G	AST	PTS	Penalty minutes
Frank Mahovlich	70	33	38	71	87
Dave Keon	64	26	35	61	2
George Armstrong	70	21	32	53	27
Red Kelly	58	22	27	49	6
Bob Nevin	69	15	30	45	10
Bob Pulford	70	18	21	39	98
Dick Duff	51	17	20	37	37
Bert Olmstead	56	13	23	36	10
Billy Harris	67	15	10	25	14
Eddie Shack	44	7	14	21	62
Ed Litzenberger	37	10	10	20	14
Ron Stewart	60	8	9	17	14
John MacMillan	31	1	0	1	8
Les Kozak	12	1	0	1	2
Larry Keenan	2	0	0	0	0
Brian Conacher	1	0	0	0	0
Alex Faulkner	1	0	0	0	0

=== Defencemen ===
Note: GP= Games played; G= Goals; AST= Assists; PTS = Points; PIM = Points

Player	GP	G	AST	PTS	PIM
Tim Horton	70	10	28	38	88
Allan Stanley	60	9	26	35	24
Carl Brewer	67	1	22	23	89
Bobby Baun	65	4	11	15	94
Al Arbour	52	1	5	6	68
Arnie Brown	2	0	0	0	0
Larry Hillman	5	0	0	0	4

=== Goaltending ===
Note: GP= Games played; W= Wins; L= Losses; T = Ties; SO = Shutouts; GAA = Goals Against

Player	GP	W	L	T	SO	GAA
Johnny Bower	59	31	18	10	2	2.56
Don Simmons	9	5	3	1	1	2.33
Gerry Cheevers	2	1	1	0	0	3.00

== Awards and records ==
- Dave Keon, Lady Byng Trophy

== See also ==
- Fifty Mission Cap, a song about the Leafs 1951 and 1962 Cup wins.
