= Greg McKegg =

Canadian ice hockey player (born 1992)

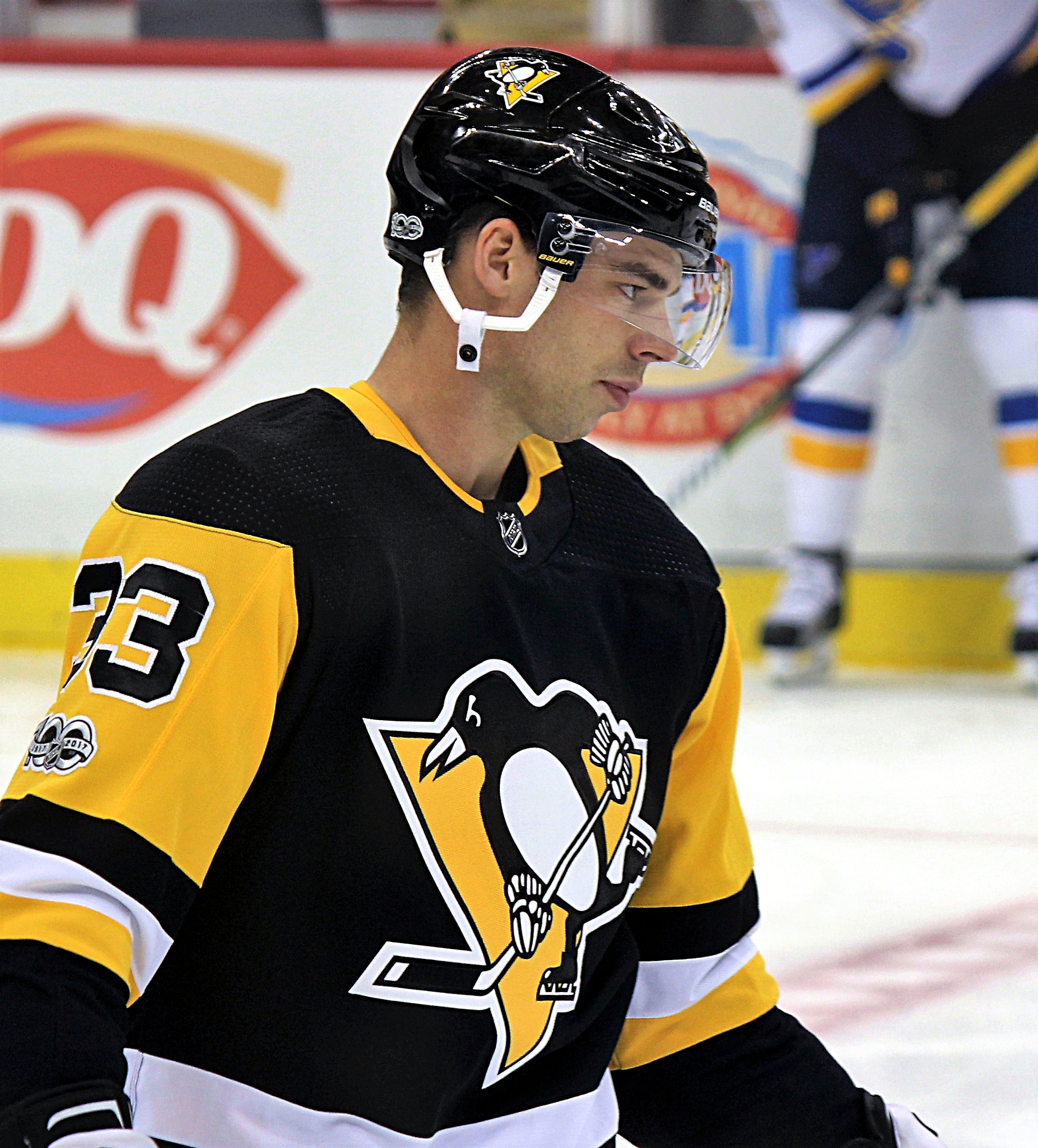
- McKegg with the Pittsburgh Penguins in 2017
- Born: June 17, 1992 (age 34) St. Thomas, Ontario, Canada
- Height: 6 ft 0 in (183 cm)
- Weight: 195 lb (88 kg; 13 st 13 lb)
- Position: Centre
- Shoots: Left
- team Former teams: Milano Hockey Club; Toronto Maple Leafs; Florida Panthers; Tampa Bay Lightning; Pittsburgh Penguins; Carolina Hurricanes; New York Rangers; Boston Bruins; Shanghai Dragons
- NHL draft: 62nd overall, 2010; Toronto Maple Leafs
- Playing career: 2011–present

Greg McKegg (born June 17, 1992) is a Canadian professional ice hockey centre signed to Milano Hockey Club. McKegg was selected by the Toronto Maple Leafs in the third round (62nd overall) of the 2010 NHL entry draft. He notably wore number 69 in the preseason for the Maple Leafs. McKegg also became a fan favorite with the Rangers in both stints with the team.

McKegg's great uncle was former NHL defenceman Lou Fontinato.

== Playing career ==
McKegg played four seasons (2008–2012) of major junior hockey in the Ontario Hockey League (OHL), for a short time with the London Knights, but the majority with the Erie Otters, scoring 125 goals and 145 assists for 270 points, while earning 143 penalty minutes, in 262 games played.

McKegg competed with Team Canada at the 2010 IIHF World U18 Championships, leading the team with six assists and seven points in six games played.

On April 6, 2011, the Toronto Maple Leafs signed McKegg to a three-year, entry-level contract.

On February 1, 2014, the Toronto Maple Leafs recalled McKegg from their American Hockey League affiliate, the Toronto Marlies. Taking Peter Holland's place on the roster, McKegg made his NHL debut that night playing three minutes and 43 seconds. He registered two hits, one shot on goal, and won one of his six face-offs in helping Toronto to a 6–3 win over the visiting Ottawa Senators.

On June 19, 2015, the Toronto Maple Leafs traded Greg McKegg to the Florida Panthers in exchange for Zach Hyman and a conditional 2017 draft pick. On September 25, 2015, was placed on waivers from Panthers to be assigned to affiliate, the Portland Pirates of the AHL.

In the 2016–17 season, McKegg appeared in a career-high 31 games with the Panthers for six points before he was claimed off waivers by the Tampa Bay Lightning on February 27, 2017.

On July 1, 2017, McKegg was signed as a free agent to a one-year, two-way $650,000 contract to play for the Pittsburgh Penguins. He made an early impression in his new organization at training camp, making the opening night roster as the Penguins initial third-line center for the 2017–18 season. In 26 games, McKegg registered two goals and four points before he was placed on waivers by the Penguins, who returned to full health, on December 6, 2017. He was assigned to AHL affiliate, the Wilkes-Barre/Scranton Penguins, and contributed with 12 points in 28 games before on February 26, 2018, the Penguins traded McKegg to the Carolina Hurricanes in exchange for Josh Jooris.

In the off-season, McKegg opted to continue with the Hurricanes, agreeing to a one-year, two-way contract on July 12, 2018.

On July 1, 2019, McKegg was signed as a free agent to a one-year contract with the New York Rangers. In the 2019–20 season, McKegg made the Rangers opening roster and, in his first full season in the NHL, appeared in a season-high 53 games. He tallied five goals and nine points in a fourth-line role, helping the Rangers reach the qualifying round, and went scoreless in three post-season games.

On October 14, 2020, McKegg was signed as a free agent to a one-year, two-way contract with the Boston Bruins. In the pandemic delayed 2020–21 season, McKegg was limited to just five games with the Bruins, spending the majority of his tenure on the club's taxi squad.

As a free agent, McKegg opted to return to former club, the New York Rangers, agreeing to a one-year, two-way contract on July 28, 2021.

At the conclusion of his contract with the Rangers, McKegg left as a free agent and was signed to a two-year, two-way contract with the Edmonton Oilers on July 13, 2022.

On September 25, 2024, McKegg signed a one-year contract with BK Mladá Boleslav of the Czech Extraliga. On October 31st, 2024, it was announced that McKegg would part ways with the team before playing a game after seriously injuring his knee in a training session and requiring surgery.

== Career statistics ==
=== Regular season and playoffs ===
| | | | Regular season | | | | | Playoffs |
| Season | Team | League | GP | G | A | Pts | PIM | GP | G | A | PTS | PIM |
|---|---|---|---|---|---|---|---|---|---|---|---|---|
| 2008–09 | Erie Otters | OHL | 64 | 8 | 10 | 18 | 22 | 5 | 2 | 1 | 3 | 4 |
| 2009–10 | Erie Otters | OHL | 67 | 37 | 48 | 85 | 32 | 4 | 2 | 1 | 3 | 0 |
| 2010–11 | Erie Otters | OHL | 66 | 49 | 43 | 92 | 35 | 7 | 4 | 1 | 5 | 12 |
| 2010–11 | Toronto Marlies | AHL | 2 | 1 | 0 | 1 | 0 | — | — | — | — | — |
| 2011–12 | Erie Otters | OHL | 35 | 12 | 22 | 34 | 32 | — | — | — | — | — |
| 2011–12 | London Knights | OHL | 30 | 19 | 22 | 41 | 22 | 15 | 4 | 7 | 11 | 2 |
| 2012–13 | Toronto Marlies | AHL | 61 | 8 | 15 | 23 | 22 | 9 | 3 | 3 | 6 | 10 |
| 2013–14 | Toronto Marlies | AHL | 65 | 19 | 28 | 47 | 31 | 14 | 3 | 3 | 6 | 10 |
| 2013–14 | Toronto Maple Leafs | NHL | 1 | 0 | 0 | 0 | 0 | — | — | — | — | — |
| 2014–15 | Toronto Marlies | AHL | 62 | 22 | 15 | 37 | 39 | 5 | 2 | 0 | 2 | 12 |
| 2014–15 | Toronto Maple Leafs | NHL | 3 | 0 | 0 | 0 | 0 | — | — | — | — | — |
| 2015–16 | Portland Pirates | AHL | 47 | 10 | 13 | 23 | 22 | 3 | 1 | 0 | 1 | 2 |
| 2015–16 | Florida Panthers | NHL | 15 | 2 | 0 | 2 | 2 | 1 | 0 | 0 | 0 | 2 |
| 2016–17 | Springfield Thunderbirds | AHL | 7 | 2 | 2 | 4 | 2 | — | — | — | — | — |
| 2016–17 | Florida Panthers | NHL | 31 | 3 | 3 | 6 | 11 | — | — | — | — | — |
| 2016–17 | Tampa Bay Lightning | NHL | 15 | 0 | 1 | 1 | 11 | — | — | — | — | — |
| 2017–18 | Pittsburgh Penguins | NHL | 26 | 2 | 2 | 4 | 8 | — | — | — | — | — |
| 2017–18 | Wilkes-Barre/Scranton Penguins | AHL | 28 | 5 | 7 | 12 | 10 | — | — | — | — | — |
| 2017–18 | Charlotte Checkers | AHL | 19 | 9 | 14 | 23 | 4 | 8 | 1 | 4 | 5 | 2 |
| 2018–19 | Charlotte Checkers | AHL | 31 | 6 | 17 | 23 | 18 | — | — | — | — | — |
| 2018–19 | Carolina Hurricanes | NHL | 41 | 6 | 5 | 11 | 8 | 14 | 2 | 0 | 2 | 4 |
| 2019–20 | New York Rangers | NHL | 53 | 5 | 4 | 9 | 17 | 3 | 0 | 0 | 0 | 2 |
| 2020–21 | Boston Bruins | NHL | 5 | 1 | 0 | 1 | 2 | — | — | — | — | — |
| 2020–21 | Providence Bruins | AHL | 2 | 0 | 2 | 2 | 0 | — | — | — | — | — |
| 2021–22 | New York Rangers | NHL | 43 | 2 | 3 | 5 | 6 | — | — | — | — | — |
| 2021–22 | Hartford Wolf Pack | AHL | 1 | 0 | 0 | 0 | 0 | — | — | — | — | — |
| 2022–23 | Bakersfield Condors | AHL | 66 | 7 | 13 | 20 | 62 | 2 | 0 | 0 | 0 | 2 |
| 2023–24 | Bakersfield Condors | AHL | 63 | 7 | 22 | 29 | 61 | 2 | 0 | 0 | 0 | 0 |
| 2025–26 | Shanghai Dragons | KHL | 8 | 1 | 2 | 3 | 2 | — | — | — | — | — |
| NHL totals | | | 233 | 21 | 18 | 39 | 65 | 18 | 2 | 0 | 2 | 8 |

=== International ===
| Year | Team | Event | Result | GP | G | A | Pts | PIM |
|---|---|---|---|---|---|---|---|---|
| 2009 | Canada Ontario | U17 | 1st place, gold medalist(s) | 6 | 0 | 1 | 1 | 2 |
| 2010 | Canada | U18 | 7th | 6 | 1 | 6 | 7 | 4 |
| Junior totals | | | | 12 | 1 | 7 | 8 | 6 |
