= 1961–62 Boston Bruins season =

NHL team season

1961–62 Boston Bruins
- League: 6th NHL
- 1961–62 record: 15–47–8
- Home record: 9–22–4
- Road record: 6–25–4
- Goals for: 177
- Goals against: 306

Team information
- General manager: Lynn Patrick
- Coach: Phil Watson
- Captain: Don McKenney
- Arena: Boston Garden

Team leaders
- Goals: Don McKenney (22)
- Assists: John Bucyk (40)
- Points: John Bucyk (60)
- Penalty minutes: Ted Green (116)
- Wins: Don Head (9)
- Goals against average: Don Head (4.16)

The 1961–62 Boston Bruins season was the Bruins' 38th season in the NHL. Earning 38 of a possible 140 points in the standings, the team's 0.271 points percentage was the worst in their history excluding their inaugural season in 1924–25, in which they captured 12 out of a possible 60 points (0.200). The team also endured a 20-game winless streak (16 losses and 4 ties) which included the entire month of February The Bruins missed the playoffs for the third consecutive season for the first time in franchise history.

== Regular season ==
=== Final standings ===
National Hockey League
		GP	W	L	T	GF	GA	DIFF	Pts
1	Montreal Canadiens	70	42	14	14	259	166	+93	98
2	Toronto Maple Leafs	70	37	22	11	232	180	+52	85
3	Chicago Black Hawks	70	31	26	13	217	186	+31	75
4	New York Rangers	70	26	32	12	195	207	−12	64
5	Detroit Red Wings	70	23	33	14	184	219	−35	60
6	Boston Bruins	70	15	47	8	177	306	−129	38

=== Record vs. opponents ===
1961–62 NHL Records
Team	BOS	CHI	DET	MTL	NYR	TOR
Boston	—	2–10–2	4–8–2	3–10–1	2–10–2	4–9–1
Chicago	10–2–2	—	7–3–4	3–9–2	7–6–1	4–6–4
Detroit	8–4–2	3–7–4	—	3–8–3	6–5–3	3–9–2
Montreal	10–3–1	9–3–2	8–3–3	—	8–1–5	7–4–3
New York	10–2–2	6–7–1	5–6–3	1–8–5	—	4–9–1
Toronto	9–4–1	6–4–4	9–3–2	4–7–3	9–4–1	—

== Schedule and results ==
1961–62 regular season
October

Game	Result	Date	Score	Opponent	Record
1	L	October 11, 1961	2–6	New York Rangers (1961–62)	0–1–0
2	L	October 12, 1961	3–6	@ New York Rangers (1961–62)	0–2–0
3	L	October 14, 1961	2–3	@ Toronto Maple Leafs (1961–62)	0–3–0
4	T	October 15, 1961	5–5	Montreal Canadiens (1961–62)	0–3–1
5	L	October 17, 1961	3–5	@ Chicago Black Hawks (1961–62)	0–4–1
6	L	October 19, 1961	3–7	@ Detroit Red Wings (1961–62)	0–5–1
7	L	October 21, 1961	2–6	@ Montreal Canadiens (1961–62)	0–6–1
8	L	October 22, 1961	1–9	Toronto Maple Leafs (1961–62)	0–7–1
9	W	October 26, 1961	4–0	Detroit Red Wings (1961–62)	1–7–1
10	T	October 29, 1961	2–2	Chicago Black Hawks (1961–62)	1–7–2

November

Game	Result	Date	Score	Opponent	Record
11	W	November 2, 1961	5–2	@ Montreal Canadiens (1961–62)	2–7–2
12	L	November 5, 1961	3–4	Chicago Black Hawks (1961–62)	2–8–2
13	T	November 8, 1961	4–4	@ New York Rangers (1961–62)	2–8–3
14	L	November 9, 1961	1–2	@ Detroit Red Wings (1961–62)	2–9–3
15	W	November 12, 1961	4–3	Toronto Maple Leafs (1961–62)	3–9–3
16	W	November 16, 1961	3–2	Montreal Canadiens (1961–62)	4–9–3
17	L	November 19, 1961	2–6	Detroit Red Wings (1961–62)	4–10–3
18	L	November 23, 1961	3–4	New York Rangers (1961–62)	4–11–3
19	L	November 25, 1961	0–5	@ Montreal Canadiens (1961–62)	4–12–3
20	L	November 26, 1961	1–4	Toronto Maple Leafs (1961–62)	4–13–3
21	L	November 29, 1961	4–7	@ Chicago Black Hawks (1961–62)	4–14–3
22	L	November 30, 1961	1–3	@ Detroit Red Wings (1961–62)	4–15–3

December

Game	Result	Date	Score	Opponent	Record
23	W	December 2, 1961	3–1	New York Rangers (1961–62)	5–15–3
24	L	December 3, 1961	1–3	@ New York Rangers (1961–62)	5–16–3
25	L	December 7, 1961	2–5	Chicago Black Hawks (1961–62)	5–17–3
26	L	December 9, 1961	2–9	@ Toronto Maple Leafs (1961–62)	5–18–3
27	L	December 10, 1961	3–4	Montreal Canadiens (1961–62)	5–19–3
28	T	December 13, 1961	2–2	@ Chicago Black Hawks (1961–62)	5–19–4
29	L	December 14, 1961	0–5	@ Detroit Red Wings (1961–62)	5–20–4
30	L	December 16, 1961	4–8	@ Montreal Canadiens (1961–62)	5–21–4
31	L	December 17, 1961	1–4	Toronto Maple Leafs (1961–62)	5–22–4
32	W	December 21, 1961	4–2	Detroit Red Wings (1961–62)	6–22–4
33	W	December 23, 1961	7–4	@ Toronto Maple Leafs (1961–62)	7–22–4
34	L	December 25, 1961	2–5	Montreal Canadiens (1961–62)	7–23–4
35	W	December 31, 1961	7–4	@ New York Rangers (1961–62)	8–23–4

January

Game	Result	Date	Score	Opponent	Record
36	L	January 1, 1962	2–4	New York Rangers (1961–62)	8–24–4
37	L	January 6, 1962	2–6	@ Detroit Red Wings (1961–62)	8–25–4
38	W	January 7, 1962	2–0	@ Chicago Black Hawks (1961–62)	9–25–4
39	L	January 10, 1962	5–7	@ Toronto Maple Leafs (1961–62)	9–26–4
40	L	January 11, 1962	0–6	Chicago Black Hawks (1961–62)	9–27–4
41	L	January 13, 1962	3–5	@ Montreal Canadiens (1961–62)	9–28–4
42	L	January 14, 1962	1–4	Montreal Canadiens (1961–62)	9–29–4
43	W	January 18, 1962	5–3	Detroit Red Wings (1961–62)	10–29–4
44	W	January 20, 1962	5–4	@ Toronto Maple Leafs (1961–62)	11–29–4
45	L	January 21, 1962	1–5	Toronto Maple Leafs (1961–62)	11–30–4
46	W	January 27, 1962	5–3	Chicago Black Hawks (1961–62)	12–30–4
47	L	January 28, 1962	1–5	Montreal Canadiens (1961–62)	12–31–4
48	L	January 31, 1962	0–5	@ New York Rangers (1961–62)	12–32–4

February

Game	Result	Date	Score	Opponent	Record
49	L	February 1, 1962	3–5	New York Rangers (1961–62)	12–33–4
50	L	February 3, 1962	3–6	@ Chicago Black Hawks (1961–62)	12–34–4
51	L	February 4, 1962	0–6	@ Detroit Red Wings (1961–62)	12–35–4
52	T	February 7, 1962	2–2	@ Toronto Maple Leafs (1961–62)	12–35–5
53	L	February 8, 1962	2–6	Chicago Black Hawks (1961–62)	12–36–5
54	T	February 10, 1962	2–2	Detroit Red Wings (1961–62)	12–36–6
55	L	February 11, 1962	3–5	New York Rangers (1961–62)	12–37–6
56	L	February 15, 1962	1–9	@ Montreal Canadiens (1961–62)	12–38–6
57	L	February 18, 1962	0–6	@ Chicago Black Hawks (1961–62)	12–39–6
58	L	February 21, 1962	2–4	@ New York Rangers (1961–62)	12–40–6
59	L	February 24, 1962	2–7	@ Toronto Maple Leafs (1961–62)	12–41–6
60	L	February 25, 1962	0–8	@ Chicago Black Hawks (1961–62)	12–42–6
61	T	February 28, 1962	2–2	@ New York Rangers (1961–62)	12–42–7

March

Game	Result	Date	Score	Opponent	Record
62	L	March 1, 1962	4–5	Chicago Black Hawks (1961–62)	12–43–7
63	L	March 4, 1962	1–5	Toronto Maple Leafs (1961–62)	12–44–7
64	L	March 8, 1962	0–3	Detroit Red Wings (1961–62)	12–45–7
65	L	March 10, 1962	2–5	@ Montreal Canadiens (1961–62)	12–46–7
66	T	March 11, 1962	2–2	Detroit Red Wings (1961–62)	12–46–8
67	W	March 15, 1962	4–0	@ Detroit Red Wings (1961–62)	13–46–8
68	W	March 18, 1962	6–2	Montreal Canadiens (1961–62)	14–46–8
69	L	March 22, 1962	3–4	New York Rangers (1961–62)	14–47–8
70	W	March 25, 1962	5–4	Toronto Maple Leafs (1961–62)	15–47–8

Legend: Win (2 points) Loss (0 points) Tie (1 point)

== Player statistics ==
=== Regular season ===
Scoring

Player	Pos	GP	G	A	Pts	PIM
John Bucyk	LW	67	20	40	60	32
Don McKenney	C	70	22	33	55	10
Jerry Toppazzini	RW	70	19	31	50	26
Murray Oliver	C	70	17	29	46	21
Doug Mohns	LW/D	69	16	29	45	74
Cliff Pennington	C	70	9	32	41	2
Charlie Burns	C	70	11	17	28	43
Andre Pronovost	LW	70	15	8	23	74
Leo Boivin	D	65	5	18	23	70
Wayne Connelly	C	61	8	12	20	34
Terry Gray	RW	42	8	7	15	15
Tommy Williams	RW	26	6	6	12	2
Ted Green	D	66	3	8	11	116
Ed Westfall	D/RW	63	2	9	11	53
Bob Beckett	C	34	7	2	9	14
Larry Leach	C	28	2	5	7	18
Pat Stapleton	D	69	2	5	7	42
Dick Meissner	RW	66	3	3	6	13
Bob Armstrong	D	9	2	1	3	20
Ed Chadwick	G	4	0	0	0	0
Bruce Gamble	G	28	0	0	0	4
Don Head	G	38	0	0	0	14
Orland Kurtenbach	C	8	0	0	0	6
Dallas Smith	D	7	0	0	0	10

Goaltending

Player	MIN	GP	W	L	T	GA	GAA	SO
Don Head	2280	38	9	26	3	158	4.16	2
Bruce Gamble	1680	28	6	18	4	121	4.32	1
Ed Chadwick	240	4	0	3	1	22	5.50	0
Team:	4200	70	15	47	8	301	4.30	3

Note:

Pos = Position;GP = Games played; G = Goals; A = Assists; Pts = Points; PIM = Penalty minutes; +/- = Plus/minus; PPG = Power-play goals; SHG = Short-handed goals; GWG = Game-winning goals
Pos = Position;GP = Games played; Min, TOI = Minutes played; W = Wins; L = Losses; T,T/OT = Ties; OTL = Overtime losses; GA = Goals-against; GAA = Goals-against average; SO = Shutouts; SA = Shots against; SV = Shots saved;SV% = Save percentage;

== See also ==
- 1961–62 NHL season
