= Ken Schinkel =

Canadian ice hockey player (1932–2020)

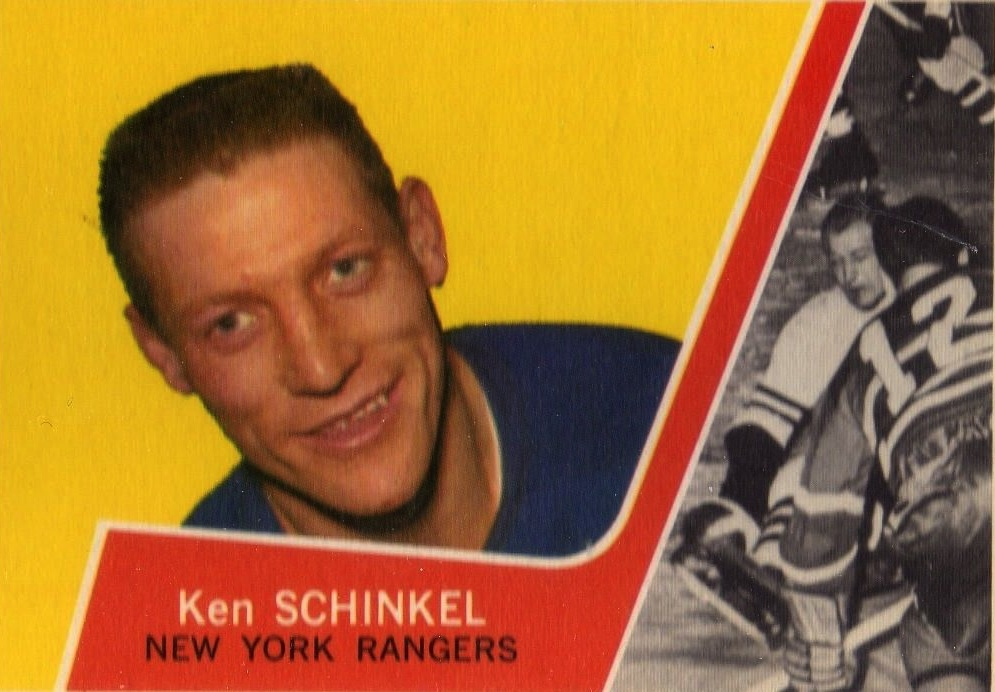
- Born: November 27, 1932 Jansen, Saskatchewan, Canada
- Died: November 20, 2020 (aged 87) Fort Myers, Florida, U.S.
- Height: 5 ft 10 in (178 cm)
- Weight: 172 lb (78 kg; 12 st 4 lb)
- Position: Right wing
- Shot: Right
- Played for: New York Rangers; Pittsburgh Penguins
- Playing career: 1950–1973

Kenneth Calvin Schinkel (November 27, 1932 – November 20, 2020) was a Canadian professional ice hockey right wing and coach. He played for the New York Rangers and Pittsburgh Penguins in the National Hockey League.

== Playing career ==
After a junior career ending with the St. Catharines Teepees of the Ontario Hockey Association in 1953, Schinkel signed with the Springfield Indians of the American Hockey League. He spent the next six years in the minors with the Indians' organization, garnering a reputation as a skilled two-way forward and penalty killer. In 1959 he led the AHL in goals with 43 and scored 85 points, earning a place on the league's Second All-Star Team, and his rights were dealt to the New York Rangers of the NHL.

He played the 1960 season with the Rangers and split the 1961 season between New York and Springfield - returning to the AHL just in time to be part of the Indians' second consecutive Calder Cup championship - before playing as a third-liner with the Rangers in 1962 and 1963. By 1964 he was back in the minors, however, and spent the next four years starring for the Rangers' farm team, the AHL Baltimore Clippers. While playing with future Hall of Famers such as Jean Ratelle and Doug Harvey, Schinkel led the Clippers in scoring two of those seasons.

When the NHL doubled in size after the 1967 season, Schinkel was drafted in the expansion draft by the Pittsburgh Penguins. Named an alternate captain by the club, he was an immediate impact player and noted penalty killer for the offensively-thin Penguins, finishing first or second in team scoring the franchise's first three seasons and being named to play in the NHL All-Star Game in 1968 and 1969; he was named again in 1971, but did not play due to a broken arm. He played six seasons in all before retiring to become the team's coach.

On April 11, 1970, Schinkel scored three goals for Pittsburgh in a Stanley Cup playoff game versus the Oakland Seals. Pittsburgh won the game 5–2.

Schinkel retired as the Penguins' career leader in games and points (both since surpassed), and with 127 goals and 198 assists for 325 points in 636 games.

== Coaching career ==
His playing career abruptly ended on Jan. 13, 1973 when he was named to replace Red Kelly as coach of the Penguins. The Penguins did not make the playoffs that season, and were 14-31-5 on Feb. 6, 1974, when Schinkel was replaced by Marc Boileau, who had been coaching in the Penguins' minor league system.

Schinkel was reassigned to a front office position, where he remained until Jan. 17, 1976, when he was tabbed to replace Boileau. The team had been 15-23-5 under Boileau, but rallied for a 20-10-7 record with Schinkel coaching and made the playoffs. The Penguins were eliminated in the first round by the Toronto Maple Leafs.

Schinkel led the Penguins to a 34-33-13 record in 1976-77, his only full season as coach. The Penguins qualified for the playoffs but were again defeated in the first round by Toronto. Schinkel was replaced by Johnny Wilson and returned to the front office for good. He held a variety of positions, including assistant general manager and scouting director in overseeing the drafting of Mario Lemieux in 1984. He stayed with the Penguins through 1989, then followed Eddie Johnston to the Hartford Whalers, where he remained in the front office for the rest of his hockey career. Schinkel coached the Penguins for 203 games, with a record of 83-92-28 for a winning percentage of .478.

Schinkel later retired to Florida, although he made appearances for Penguins' alumni affairs. He died on November 20, 2020, in Fort Myers, Florida.

== Career statistics ==
=== Regular season and playoffs ===
			Regular season					Playoffs
Season	Team	League	GP	G	A	Pts	PIM	GP	G	A	Pts	PIM
1951–52	Lindsay Bears	OHA-B	—	—	—	—	—	—	—	—	—	—
1952–53	St. Catharines Teepees	OHA	56	21	22	43	34	3	0	1	1	0
1953–54	Springfield Indians	QHL	39	3	14	17	6	—	—	—	—	—
1953–54	Syracuse Warriors	AHL	28	7	14	21	4	—	—	—	—	—
1954–55	Pembroke Lumber Kings	NOHA	57	9	23	32	18	5	1	1	2	2
1955–56	Springfield Indians	AHL	57	18	16	34	42	—	—	—	—	—
1956–57	Springfield Indians	AHL	64	22	36	58	2	—	—	—	—	—
1957–58	Springfield Indians	AHL	70	11	27	38	40	13	3	3	6	2
1958–59	Springfield Indians	AHL	70	43	42	85	19	—	—	—	—	—
1959–60	New York Rangers	NHL	69	13	16	29	27	—	—	—	—	—
1960–61	New York Rangers	NHL	38	2	6	8	18	—	—	—	—	—
1960–61	Springfield Indians	AHL	28	13	8	21	25	7	3	3	6	9
1961–62	New York Rangers	NHL	65	7	21	28	17	2	1	0	1	0
1962–63	New York Rangers	NHL	69	6	9	15	15	—	—	—	—	—
1963–64	New York Rangers	NHL	4	0	0	0	0	—	—	—	—	—
1963–64	Baltimore Clippers	AHL	64	23	33	56	35	—	—	—	—	—
1964–65	Baltimore Clippers	AHL	72	30	41	71	16	5	1	2	3	0
1965–66	Baltimore Clippers	AHL	72	30	45	75	31	—	—	—	—	—
1966–67	New York Rangers	NHL	20	6	3	9	0	4	0	1	1	0
1966–67	Baltimore Clippers	AHL	51	25	31	56	29	—	—	—	—	—
1967–68	Pittsburgh Penguins	NHL	57	14	25	39	19	—	—	—	—	—
1968–69	Pittsburgh Penguins	NHL	76	18	34	52	18	—	—	—	—	—
1969–70	Pittsburgh Penguins	NHL	72	20	25	45	19	10	4	1	5	4
1970–71	Pittsburgh Penguins	NHL	50	15	19	34	6	—	—	—	—	—
1971–72	Pittsburgh Penguins	NHL	74	15	30	45	8	3	2	0	2	0
1972–73	Pittsburgh Penguins	NHL	42	11	10	21	16	—	—	—	—	—
AHL totals			576	222	293	515	243	25	7	8	15	11
NHL totals			636	127	198	325	163	19	7	2	9	4

== Coaching record ==
Team	Year	Regular season						Post season
Team	Year	G	W	L	T	Pts	Finish	Result
Pittsburgh Penguins	1972–73	36	15	18	3	(73)	5th in West	Missed playoffs
Pittsburgh Penguins	1973–74	50	14	31	5	(65)	5th in West	Missed playoffs
Pittsburgh Penguins	1975–76	37	20	10	7	(82)	3rd in Norris	Lost in preliminary round
Pittsburgh Penguins	1976–77	80	34	33	13	81	3rd in Norris	Lost in preliminary round
NHL Total		203	83	92	28			

Preceded by Red Kelly; Marc Boileau	Head coach of the Pittsburgh Penguins; 1973–74; 1976–77	Succeeded by Marc Boileau; Johnny Wilson
