= Earl Ingarfield Sr. =

Canadian ice hockey player

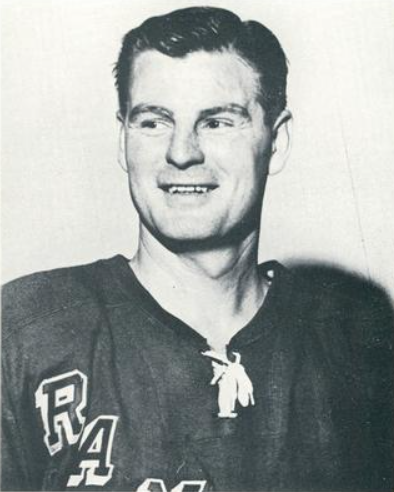
- Ingarfield in 1964 photo
- Born: October 25, 1934 (age 91) Lethbridge, Alberta, Canada
- Height: 5 ft 11 in (180 cm)
- Weight: 165 lb (75 kg; 11 st 11 lb)
- Position: Centre
- Shot: Left
- Played for: New York Rangers; Pittsburgh Penguins; Oakland/California Golden Seals
- Playing career: 1951–1971

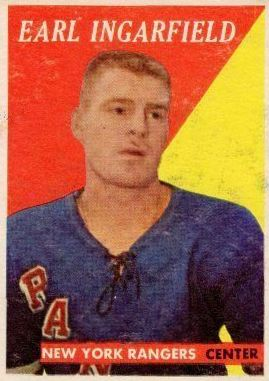
1958 card of Ingarfield

Earl Thompson Ingarfield Sr. (born October 25, 1934) is a Canadian former professional ice hockey centre who played in the National Hockey League for thirteen seasons from 1958–59 until 1970–71.

Ingarfield played 746 career NHL games, scoring 179 goals and 226 assists for 405 points. His best offensive season was the 1961–62 season when he set career highs with 26 goals, 31 assists, and 57 points while a member of the New York Rangers. In 1967 he played with the new expansion with the Pittsburgh Penguins and was their captain in 1968–69. Ingarfield was traded to the Oakland Seals in the late 1968–69 season and retired with them in 1971.

He served as the second coach for the New York Islanders during their inaugural 1972–73 season, replacing Phil Goyette. Ingarfield was supported by Aut Erickson as assistant coach. Despite being behind the bench for thirty games, he did not return to the franchise for the 1973-74 campaign.

Ingarfield's son Earl Ingarfield Jr. also played in the NHL.

== Career statistics ==
=== Regular season and playoffs ===
			Regular season					Playoffs
Season	Team	League	GP	G	A	Pts	PIM	GP	G	A	Pts	PIM
1951–52	Medicine Hat Tigers	WCJHL	44	32	15	47	28	—	—	—	—	—
1952–53	Lethbridge Native Sons	WCJHL	30	22	25	47	37	14	6	3	9	9
1952–53	Lethbridge Native Sons	M-Cup	—	—	—	—	—	11	6	2	8	12
1953–54	Lethbridge Native Sons	WCJHL	36	46	42	88	48	4	0	2	2	0
1954–55	Lethbridge Native Sons	WCJHL	36	45	31	76	45	11	5	6	11	4
1954–55	Vancouver Canucks	WHL	2	0	0	0	0	—	—	—	—	—
1954–55	Regina Pats	M-Cup	—	—	—	—	—	2	0	1	1	0
1955–56	Saskatoon Quakers	WHL	70	15	23	38	46	3	0	0	0	0
1956–57	Winnipeg Warriors	WHL	69	21	27	48	41	—	—	—	—	—
1957–58	Winnipeg Warriors	WHL	64	39	41	80	25	7	2	2	4	2
1958–59	New York Rangers	NHL	35	1	2	3	10	—	—	—	—	—
1959–60	New York Rangers	NHL	20	1	2	3	2	—	—	—	—	—
1959–60	Cleveland Barons	AHL	40	25	40	65	17	7	3	6	9	6
1960–61	New York Rangers	NHL	66	13	21	34	18	—	—	—	—	—
1961–62	New York Rangers	NHL	70	26	31	57	18	6	3	2	5	2
1962–63	New York Rangers	NHL	69	19	24	43	40	—	—	—	—	—
1963–64	New York Rangers	NHL	63	15	11	26	26	—	—	—	—	—
1964–65	New York Rangers	NHL	69	15	13	28	40	—	—	—	—	—
1965–66	New York Rangers	NHL	68	20	16	36	35	—	—	—	—	—
1966–67	New York Rangers	NHL	67	12	22	34	12	4	1	0	1	2
1967–68	Pittsburgh Penguins	NHL	50	15	22	37	12	—	—	—	—	—
1968–69	Pittsburgh Penguins	NHL	40	8	15	23	4	—	—	—	—	—
1968–69	Oakland Seals	NHL	26	8	15	23	8	7	4	6	10	2
1969–70	Oakland Seals	NHL	54	21	24	45	10	4	1	0	1	4
1970–71	California Golden Seals	NHL	49	5	8	13	4	—	—	—	—	—
NHL totals			746	179	226	405	239	21	9	8	17	10

== Coaching record ==
Team	Year	Regular season						Postseason			
Team	Year	G	W	L	OTL	Pts	Finish	G	W	L	Result
New York Islanders	1972–73	30	6	22	2	30	8th in East	Missed playoffs			

== Legacy ==
In the 2009 book 100 Ranger Greats, the authors ranked Ingarfield at No. 79 all-time of the 901 New York Rangers who had played during the team's first 82 seasons.

Preceded by Phil Goyette	Head coach of the New York Islanders; 1973	Succeeded by Al Arbour
Preceded by Ab McDonald	Pittsburgh Penguins captain 1968–69	Succeeded by TBN
