= Phil Goyette =

Canadian ice hockey player (1933–2026)

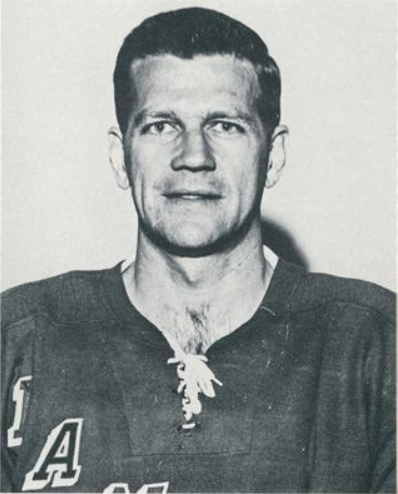
- Born: October 31, 1933 Lachine, Quebec, Canada
- Died: January 17, 2026 (aged 92) Montreal, Canada
- Height: 5 ft 11 in (180 cm)
- Weight: 170 lb (77 kg; 12 st 2 lb)
- Position: Centre
- Shot: Left
- Played for: Montreal Canadiens; New York Rangers; St. Louis Blues; Buffalo Sabres
- Playing career: 1956–1972

Joseph Georges Philippe Goyette (October 31, 1933 – January 17, 2026) was a Canadian professional ice hockey player who played as a centre in the National Hockey League (NHL) for 16 seasons between 1956 and 1972.

== Playing career ==
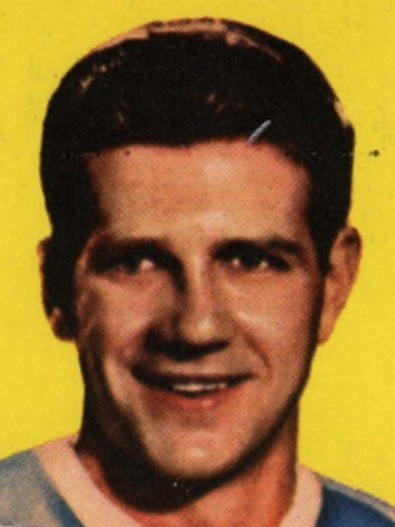
1963 Topps card

Goyette played 941 career NHL games, scoring 207 goals and 467 assists for 674 points. Goyette played his first seven NHL seasons with the Montreal Canadiens, winning four Stanley Cup titles. On June 4, 1963, Goyette was traded to the New York Rangers with Donnie Marshall and Jacques Plante for Dave Balon, Leon Rochefort, Len Ronson, and Gump Worsley. He spent another seven seasons with the Rangers, before being traded on June 10, 1969 to the St. Louis Blues for a first-round draft pick. Goyette had his best offensive season with the Blues, scoring 29 goals and 49 assists for 78 points (both career highs), winning the Lady Byng Memorial Trophy for sportsmanship and gentlemanly conduct and leading the team to the 1970 Stanley Cup Final. He had three goals and 11 assists in the team's 1970 playoff run. Goyette was drafted by the Buffalo Sabres in the 1970 expansion draft. Goyette was traded back to the Rangers late in the 1971–72 campaign and retired after the season.

== Coaching career ==
Goyette started the 1972–73 season as the inaugural coach of the expansion New York Islanders but was replaced January 29, 1973 by Earl Ingarfield Sr. He never coached again, leaving his NHL coaching record at 6–38–4.

== Death ==
Goyette died in Montreal on January 17, 2026, at the age of 92.

== Career statistics ==
=== Regular season and playoffs ===
			Regular season					Playoffs
Season	Team	League	GP	G	A	Pts	PIM	GP	G	A	Pts	PIM
1950–51	Montreal Nationale	QJHL	44	10	19	29	26	3	1	3	4	0
1951–52	Montreal Nationale	QJHL	45	23	28	51	11	9	3	5	8	4
1952–53	Montreal Jr. Canadiens	QJHL	44	23	36	59	13	7	2	4	6	0
1953–54	Montreal Jr. Canadiens	QJHL	50	43	47	90	19	8	4	5	9	0
1954–55	Cincinnati Mohawks	IHL	57	41	51	92	17	10	6	8	14	2
1954–55	Montreal Royals	QHL	—	—	—	—	—	4	0	1	1	0
1955–56	Montreal Royals	QHL	58	19	15	34	4	13	10	7	17	0
1955–56	Montreal Royals	Ed-Cup	—	—	—	—	—	6	1	3	4	0
1956–57	Montreal Canadiens	NHL	14	3	4	7	0	10	2	1	3	4
1956–57	Montreal Royals	QHL	47	13	18	31	10	—	—	—	—	—
1957–58	Montreal Canadiens	NHL	70	9	37	46	8	10	4	1	5	4
1958–59	Montreal Canadiens	NHL	63	10	18	28	8	10	0	4	4	0
1959–60	Montreal Canadiens	NHL	65	21	22	43	4	8	2	1	3	4
1960–61	Montreal Canadiens	NHL	62	7	4	11	4	6	3	3	6	0
1961–62	Montreal Canadiens	NHL	69	7	27	34	18	6	1	4	5	2
1962–63	Montreal Canadiens	NHL	32	5	8	13	2	2	0	0	0	0
1963–64	New York Rangers	NHL	67	24	41	65	15	—	—	—	—	—
1964–65	New York Rangers	NHL	52	12	34	46	6	—	—	—	—	—
1965–66	New York Rangers	NHL	60	11	31	42	6	—	—	—	—	—
1966–67	New York Rangers	NHL	70	12	49	61	6	4	1	0	1	0
1967–68	New York Rangers	NHL	73	25	40	65	10	6	0	1	1	4
1968–69	New York Rangers	NHL	67	13	32	45	8	3	0	0	0	0
1969–70	St. Louis Blues	NHL	72	29	49	78	16	16	3	11	14	6
1970–71	Buffalo Sabres	NHL	60	15	46	61	6	—	—	—	—	—
1971–72	Buffalo Sabres	NHL	37	3	21	24	14	—	—	—	—	—
1971–72	New York Rangers	NHL	8	1	4	5	0	13	1	3	4	2
NHL totals			941	207	467	674	131	94	17	29	46	26

== Coaching record ==
Team	Year	Regular season						Postseason
Team	Year	G	W	L	T	Pts	Finish	Result
New York Islanders	1972–73	48	6	38	4	30	8th in East	Fired

== Career achievements and records ==
- Won the 1954-55 James Gatschene Memorial Trophy, IHL
- Won the 1954-55 George H. Wilkinson Trophy, IHL
- Won the 1969–70 Lady Byng Memorial Trophy
- Won Stanley Cup 1957, 1958, 1959 and 1960.
- In the 2009 book 100 Ranger Greats, was ranked No. 59 all-time of the 901 New York Rangers who had played during the team's first 82 seasons

Preceded by Alex Delvecchio	Winner of the Lady Byng Trophy; 1970	Succeeded by John Bucyk
Preceded by Position created	Head coach of the New York Islanders; 1972–73	Succeeded by Earl Ingarfield
