= 1961–62 NHL season =

National Hockey League season

- League: National Hockey League
- Sport: Ice hockey
- Duration: October 11, 1961 – April 22, 1962
- Games: 70
- Teams: 6
- TV partner(s): CBC, SRC (Canada); None (United States)

Regular season
- Season champion: Montreal Canadiens
- Season MVP: Jacques Plante (Canadiens)
- Top scorer: Bobby Hull (Black Hawks)

Stanley Cup
- Champions: Toronto Maple Leafs
- Runners-up: Chicago Black Hawks

NHL seasons
- ← 1960–61 1962–63 →

The 1961–62 NHL season was the 45th season of the National Hockey League (NHL). Six teams played 70 games each. The Toronto Maple Leafs were the Stanley Cup champions as they defeated the Chicago Black Hawks four games to two.

== League business ==
At a meeting of the owners and governors, Conn Smythe resigned as Toronto's governor, to be replaced by his son, Stafford Smythe. Thereupon, Conn Smythe was appointed honorary governor.

== Pre-season ==
A big trade took place between the Montreal Canadiens and the New York Rangers with Doug Harvey and Albert Langlois going to the Rangers for Lou Fontinato. Harvey was named player-coach of the Rangers.

In an exhibition game in Trail, British Columbia, Jean Beliveau tore knee ligaments and would be unavailable for some time. This followed a knee injury to Dickie Moore.

Several holdouts on the Stanley Cup champion Chicago Black Hawks were reported. Stan Mikita, Reg Fleming and Dollard St. Laurent refused to sign their contracts, but they eventually came to terms.

== Regular season ==
Glenn Hall received one of the greatest standing ovations in NHL history just before the NHL All-star game began. He had difficulty suppressing his emotions at the tremendous welcome he received. The All-stars defeated the Black Hawks 3–1.

Doug Harvey scored a goal in his debut as player-coach of the Rangers when they trounced the Boston Bruins 6–2 right at Boston Garden. The Rangers downed the Bruins again at Madison Square Garden 6–3 as Andy Bathgate had the hat trick and Camille Henry had two goals.

Montreal downed the Rangers 3–1 in their home opener as Henri Richard led the way with two goals playing with Beliveau and Moore, two cripples who were not expected to play. Doug Harvey was given an ovation by the crowd as he skated out in a Ranger uniform. The new defence pair of Al MacNeil and Lou Fontinato turned in a good game.

Earl Ingarfield Sr. had a hat-trick on November 19 as the Rangers beat the Maple Leafs 5–3. The Broadway Blueshirts were showing some power, and three nights later, Doug Harvey picked up three assists and Gump Worsley picked up a shutout as the Rangers blanked the Red Wings 4–0. The win put the Rangers into first place and the following night they beat the Bruins 4–3 as Harvey scored the winner.

Ab McDonald had the hat trick December 6, as Chicago drubbed the Rangers 8–3 right at Madison Square Garden. Bill Hay had four assists for the Black Hawks.

Toronto took over first place January 10 when they beat the Bruins 7–5. Frank Mahovlich scored two goals on his 24th birthday and Dave Keon also had two goals.

Glenn Hall played his 500th consecutive game January 17, but was beaten 7–3 by Montreal. In a losing cause, Bobby Hull scored two goals, including his 20th of the season. Glenn Hall received a car from James D. Norris, president of the Black Hawks.

Percy LeSueur, famous Ottawa goaltender in the old NHA, died on January 28, 1962, at age 79.

Bobby Hull scored four goals February 1 as the Black Hawks defeated Detroit 7–4.

The Rangers defeated the Red Wings 3–2 at home March 14, but the two highlights were Gordie Howe's 500th goal on Gump Worsley and a penalty shot for the Rangers Andy Bathgate. Howe took a pass from Alex Delvecchio and made a nice move to get by Doug Harvey. Howe switched to a left-handed shot and beat Worsley with a backhander for the 500th goal. Midway through the third period, Dean Prentice had a breakaway and was skating toward the Detroit goal, when Hank Bassen, the Detroit goalkeeper, slid his stick to break up the play. Referee Eddie Powers awarded a penalty shot, but somehow forgot that the rules had been changed that season to read that the offended player must take the shot, not one of his teammates, and Powers permitted Andy Bathgate to take the shot. Bathgate gave Bassen some of his slick dekes and Bassen flopped on his face, allowing Bathgate to fire the puck into the open net for the winning goal. From there, the Rangers held on and made the playoffs for the first time since 1958.

Bobby Hull joined the 50 goal club when he scored his 50th goal at about the five-minute mark of the first period as the Chicago Black Hawks beat the New York Rangers 4–1 at Madison Square Garden in the final game of the season.

Hall and Jacques Plante of the Canadiens played every minute of every game in goal; other than Eddie Johnston of the Bruins two seasons later in 1964, they were the last major professional goaltenders to do so.

The first 43 seasons saw only one 50 goal scorer, Maurice "Rocket" Richard. Then last season, 1960–61, Bernie Geoffrion scored 50. This season saw another 50 goal scorer in Bobby Hull of the Chicago Black Hawks. From this point onwards until the new century, far more seasons than not would see at least one player score fifty in a season.

=== Final standings ===
National Hockey League
		GP	W	L	T	GF	GA	DIFF	Pts
1	Montreal Canadiens	70	42	14	14	259	166	+93	98
2	Toronto Maple Leafs	70	37	22	11	232	180	+52	85
3	Chicago Black Hawks	70	31	26	13	217	186	+31	75
4	New York Rangers	70	26	32	12	195	207	−12	64
5	Detroit Red Wings	70	23	33	14	184	219	−35	60
6	Boston Bruins	70	15	47	8	177	306	−129	38

== Playoffs ==
=== Playoff bracket ===
The top four teams in the league qualified for the playoffs. In the semifinals, the first-place team played the third-place team, while the second-place team faced the fourth-place team, with the winners advancing to the Stanley Cup Finals. In both rounds, teams competed in a best-of-seven series (scores in the bracket indicate the number of games won in each best-of-seven series).

Semifinals
1	Montreal	2
3	Chicago	4
2	Toronto	4
4	New York	2

Stanley Cup Finals
3	Chicago	2
2	Toronto	4

=== Semifinals ===
The Black Hawks returned to the Finals, by defeating the first-place Canadiens four games to two in the semifinal. In the other, the second-place Maple Leafs defeated the Rangers, also in six games to advance to the Finals.

==== (1) Montreal Canadiens vs. (3) Chicago Black Hawks ====
March 27	Chicago Black Hawks	1–2	Montreal Canadiens	Montreal Forum	Recap
No scoring		First period	No scoring
No scoring		Second period	No scoring
Stan Mikita (1) – sh – 18:06		Third period	01:32 – Dickie Moore (1); 05:38 – pp – Jean Beliveau (1)
Glenn Hall 34 saves / 36 shots		Goalie stats	Jacques Plante 36 saves / 37 shots

March 29	Chicago Black Hawks	3–4	Montreal Canadiens	Montreal Forum	Recap
Bobby Hull (1) – pp – 05:26		First period	15:10 – pp – Dickie Moore (2)
Stan Mikita (2) – 05:15		Second period	No scoring
Bobby Hull (2) – 05:15		Third period	11:04 – pp – Dickie Moore (3); 12:45 – Jean-Guy Talbot (1); 14:05 – Claude Provost (1)
Glenn Hall 23 saves / 27 shots		Goalie stats	Jacques Plante 28 saves / 31 shots

April 1	Montreal Canadiens	1–4	Chicago Black Hawks	Chicago Stadium	Recap
No scoring		First period	09:05 – Bronco Horvath (1); 18:06 – Stan Mikita (3)
No scoring		Second period	19:17 – pp – Bill Hay (1)
Red Berenson (1) – 14:27		Third period	02:15 – Kenny Wharram (1)
Jacques Plante 23 saves / 27 shots		Goalie stats	Glenn Hall 26 saves / 27 shots

April 3	Montreal Canadiens	3–5	Chicago Black Hawks	Chicago Stadium	Recap
No scoring		First period	01:51 – pp – Bobby Hull (3); 08:28 – pp – Bronco Horvath (2)
Jean Beliveau (2) – pp – 03:36; Dickie Moore (4) – 16:04		Second period	No scoring
Gilles Tremblay (1) – 08:46		Third period	04:39 – Ab McDonald (1); 05:16 – pp – Bill Hay (2); 12:56 – pp – Ab McDonald (2)
Jacques Plante 37 saves / 42 shots		Goalie stats	Glenn Hall 32 saves / 35 shots

April 5	Chicago Black Hawks	4–3	Montreal Canadiens	Montreal Forum	Recap
Bobby Hull (4) – 02:55; Bronco Horvath (3) – 17:27		First period	06:13 – Phil Goyette (1); 13:08 – Claude Provost (2)
Kenny Wharram (2) – 19:14		Second period	No scoring
Bill Hay (3) – 01:39		Third period	10:26 – Red Berenson (2)
Glenn Hall 35 saves / 38 shots		Goalie stats	Jacques Plante 25 saves / 29 shots

April 8	Montreal Canadiens	0–2	Chicago Black Hawks	Chicago Stadium	Recap
No scoring		First period	04:02 – Ab McDonald (3)
No scoring		Second period	13:39 – Kenny Wharram (3)
No scoring		Third period	No scoring
Jacques Plante 29 saves / 31 shots		Goalie stats	Glenn Hall 41 saves / 41 shots

Chicago won series 4–2

==== (2) Toronto Maple Leafs vs. (4) New York Rangers ====
March 27	New York Rangers	2–4	Toronto Maple Leafs	Maple Leaf Gardens	Recap
No scoring		First period	06:53 – Dave Keon (1)
Ken Schinkel (1) – 11:56; Earl Ingarfield (1) – 19:25		Second period	00:24 – pp – Red Kelly (1); 14:42 – sh – Tim Horton (1)
No scoring		Third period	19:19 – en – George Armstrong (1)
Gump Worsley 27 saves / 30 shots		Goalie stats	Johnny Bower 26 saves / 28 shots

March 29	New York Rangers	1–2	Toronto Maple Leafs	Maple Leaf Gardens	Recap
No scoring		First period	No scoring
Earl Ingarfield (2) – pp – 12:42		Second period	09:37 – pp – George Armstrong (2); 18:08 – Bob Pulford (1)
No scoring		Third period	No scoring
Gump Worsley 37 saves / 39 shots		Goalie stats	Johnny Bower 27 saves / 28 shots

April 1	Toronto Maple Leafs	4–5	New York Rangers	Madison Square Garden III	Recap
Tim Horton (2) – pp – 05:59		First period	No scoring
George Armstrong (3) – 06:46		Second period	01:25 – Jean-Guy Gendron (1); 07:05 – Johnny Wilson (1); 19:50 – Johnny Wilson (2)
Red Kelly (2) – pp – 04:47; Bob Pulford (2) – 13:43		Third period	05:02 – pp – Andy Hebenton (1); 08:17 – Dave Balon (1)
Johnny Bower 26 saves / 31 shots		Goalie stats	Gump Worsley 36 saves / 40 shots

April 3	Toronto Maple Leafs	2–4	New York Rangers	Madison Square Garden III	Recap
No scoring		First period	00:41 – Rod Gilbert (1); 15:26 – Rod Gilbert (2)
No scoring		Second period	No scoring
Bob Pulford (3) – sh – 11:59; Bob Nevin (1) – 16:22		Third period	14:03 – Dave Balon (2); 19:30 – en – Jean-Guy Gendron (2)
Johnny Bower 36 saves / 39 shots		Goalie stats	Gump Worsley 40 saves / 42 shots

April 5	New York Rangers	2–3	2OT	Toronto Maple Leafs	Maple Leaf Gardens	Recap
No scoring		First period		07:46 – Ron Stewart (1)
Jean-Guy Gendron (3) – 13:42		Second period		12:21 – Frank Mahovlich (1)
Earl Ingarfield (3) – 12:31		Third period		No scoring
No scoring		Second overtime period		04:23 – Red Kelly (3)
Gump Worsley 56 saves / 59 shots		Goalie stats		Johnny Bower 39 saves / 41 shots

April 7	New York Rangers	1–7	Toronto Maple Leafs	Maple Leaf Gardens	Recap
Andy Bathgate (1) – 18:21		First period	09:36 – George Armstrong (4); 12:43 – Bob Pulford (4); 17:52 – Dave Keon (2)
No scoring		Second period	03:17 – Dick Duff (1); 05:01 – Frank Mahovlich (2); 17:34 – pp – Dick Duff (2)
No scoring		Third period	09:53 – pp – Dave Keon (3)
Gump Worsley 33 saves / 40 shots		Goalie stats	Johnny Bower 32 saves / 33 shots

Toronto won series 4–2

=== Stanley Cup Finals ===
In the Finals, the Maple Leafs defeated the defending champions in six games. It was the first of three consecutive Stanley Cup wins by the Maple Leafs.

April 10	Chicago Black Hawks	1–4	Toronto Maple Leafs	Maple Leaf Gardens	Recap
Bobby Hull (5) – pp – 03:35		First period	No scoring
No scoring		Second period	01:32 – Dave Keon (4); 13:54 – pp – Frank Mahovlich (3)
No scoring		Third period	06:03 – George Armstrong (5); 14:32 – Tim Horton (3)
Glenn Hall 33 saves / 37 shots		Goalie stats	Johnny Bower 25 saves / 26 shots

April 12	Chicago Black Hawks	2–3	Toronto Maple Leafs	Maple Leaf Gardens	Recap
No scoring		First period	02:35 – pp – Billy Harris (1)
No scoring		Second period	No scoring
Stan Mikita (4) – 08:47; Stan Mikita (5) – 18:27		Third period	09:47 – Frank Mahovlich (4); 16:08 – George Armstrong (6)
Glenn Hall 31 saves / 34 shots		Goalie stats	Johnny Bower 29 saves / 31 shots

April 15	Toronto Maple Leafs	0–3	Chicago Black Hawks	Chicago Stadium	Recap
No scoring		First period	No scoring
No scoring		Second period	04:35 – Stan Mikita (6); 08:33 – pp – Ab McDonald (4)
No scoring		Third period	19:21 – en – Bronco Horvath (4)
Johnny Bower 33 saves / 35 shots		Goalie stats	Glenn Hall 19 saves / 19 shots

April 17	Toronto Maple Leafs	1–4	Chicago Black Hawks	Chicago Stadium	Recap
Red Kelly (4) – pp – 18:08		First period	10:35 – Bobby Hull (6); 15:41 – Reg Fleming (1)
No scoring		Second period	00:46 – pp – Bobby Hull (7); 07:31 – Reg Fleming (2)
No scoring		Third period	No scoring
Johnny Bower 11 saves / 12 shots Don Simmons 18 saves / 21 shots		Goalie stats	Glenn Hall 30 saves / 31 shots

April 19	Chicago Black Hawks	4–8	Toronto Maple Leafs	Maple Leaf Gardens	Recap
Murray Balfour (1) – 18:05		First period	00:17 – Bob Pulford (5); 17:45 – Bob Pulford (6)
Ab McDonald (5) – 00:59; Ab McDonald (6) – pp – 03:07		Second period	08:31 – Billy Harris (2); 09:50 – pp – Dave Keon (5); 13:24 – Frank Mahovlich (5)
Bob Turner (1) – sh – 10:31		Third period	04:41 – George Armstrong (7); 06:31 – Frank Mahovlich (6); 13:51 – pp – Bob Pulford (7)
Glenn Hall 36 saves / 44 shots		Goalie stats	Don Simmons 26 saves / 30 shots

April 22	Toronto Maple Leafs	2–1	Chicago Black Hawks	Chicago Stadium	Recap
No scoring		First period	No scoring
No scoring		Second period	No scoring
Bob Nevin (2) – 10:29; Dick Duff (3) – pp – 14:14		Third period	08:56 – Bobby Hull (8)
Don Simmons 20 saves / 21 shots		Goalie stats	Glenn Hall 35 saves / 37 shots

Toronto won series 4–2

== Awards ==
1961–62 NHL awards
Prince of Wales Trophy: (Regular season champion)	Montreal Canadiens
Art Ross Trophy: (Top scorer)	Bobby Hull, Chicago Black Hawks
Calder Memorial Trophy: (Best first-year player)	Bobby Rousseau, Montreal Canadiens
Hart Memorial Trophy: (Most valuable player)	Jacques Plante, Montreal Canadiens
James Norris Memorial Trophy: (Best defenceman)	Doug Harvey, New York Rangers
Lady Byng Memorial Trophy: (Excellence and sportsmanship)	Dave Keon, Toronto Maple Leafs
Vezina Trophy: (Goaltender of team with the best goals-against average)	Jacques Plante, Montreal Canadiens

=== All-Star teams ===
First Team	Position	Second Team
Jacques Plante, Montreal Canadiens	G	Glenn Hall, Chicago Black Hawks
Doug Harvey, New York Rangers	D	Carl Brewer, Toronto Maple Leafs
Jean-Guy Talbot, Montreal Canadiens	D	Pierre Pilote, Chicago Black Hawks
Stan Mikita, Chicago Black Hawks	C	Dave Keon, Toronto Maple Leafs
Andy Bathgate, New York Rangers	RW	Gordie Howe, Detroit Red Wings
Bobby Hull, Chicago Black Hawks	LW	Frank Mahovlich, Toronto Maple Leafs

== Player statistics ==
=== Scoring leaders ===
Note: GP = Games played, G = Goals, A = Assists, PTS = Points, PIM = Penalties in minutes

Player	Team	GP	G	A	PTS	PIM
Bobby Hull	Chicago Black Hawks	70	50	34	84	35
Andy Bathgate	New York Rangers	70	28	56	84	44
Gordie Howe	Detroit Red Wings	70	33	44	77	54
Stan Mikita	Chicago Black Hawks	70	25	52	77	97
Frank Mahovlich	Toronto Maple Leafs	70	33	38	71	87
Alex Delvecchio	Detroit Red Wings	70	26	43	69	18
Ralph Backstrom	Montreal Canadiens	66	27	38	65	29
Norm Ullman	Detroit Red Wings	70	26	38	64	54
Bill Hay	Chicago Back Hawks	60	11	52	63	34
Claude Provost	Montreal Canadiens	70	33	29	62	22

=== Leading goaltenders ===
Note: GP = Games played; Min – Minutes played; GA = Goals against; GAA = Goals against average; W = Wins; L = Losses; T = Ties; SO = Shutouts

Player	Team	GP	MIN	GA	GAA	W	L	T	SO
Jacques Plante	Montreal Canadiens	70	4200	166	2.37	42	14	14	4
Johnny Bower	Toronto Maple Leafs	59	3540	151	2.56	31	18	10	2
Glenn Hall	Chicago Black Hawks	70	4200	185	2.64	31	26	13	9
Hank Bassen	Detroit Red Wings	27	1620	75	2.78	9	12	6	3
Lorne Worsley	New York Rangers	60	3531	173	2.94	22	27	9	2
Terry Sawchuk	Detroit Red Wings	43	2580	141	3.28	14	21	8	5
Don Head	Boston Bruins	38	2280	161	4.24	9	26	3	2
Bruce Gamble	Boston Bruins	28	1680	121	4.32	6	18	4	1

== Coaches ==
- Boston Bruins: Phil Watson
- Chicago Black Hawks: Rudy Pilous
- Detroit Red Wings: Sid Abel
- Montreal Canadiens: Toe Blake
- New York Rangers: Doug Harvey
- Toronto Maple Leafs: Punch Imlach

== Debuts ==
The following is a list of players of note who played their first NHL game in 1961–62 (listed with their first team, asterisk(*) marks debut in playoffs):

- Ed Westfall, Boston Bruins
- Pat Stapleton, Boston Bruins
- Pit Martin, Detroit Red Wings
- Red Berenson, Montreal Canadiens
- Vic Hadfield, New York Rangers
- Gerry Cheevers, Toronto Maple Leafs

== Last games ==
The following is a list of players of note that played their last game in the NHL in 1961–62 (listed with their last team):

- Dollard St. Laurent, Chicago Black Hawks
- Leo Labine, Detroit Red Wings
- Marcel Bonin, Montreal Canadiens
- Johnny Wilson, New York Rangers
- Bert Olmstead, Toronto Maple Leafs

== Broadcasting ==
Hockey Night in Canada on CBC Television televised Saturday night regular season games and Stanley Cup playoff games. Games were not broadcast in their entirety until the 1968–69 season, and were typically joined in progress, while the radio version of HNIC aired games in their entirety.

This was the second consecutive season that the NHL did not have an American national broadcaster until the 1965–66 season.

== See also ==
- 1961–62 NHL transactions
- List of Stanley Cup champions
- National Hockey League All-Star Game
- 1961 in sports
- 1962 in sports
