= Pete Goegan =

Canadian ice hockey player

- Goegan with the Pittsburgh Hornets
- Born: March 6, 1934; Fort William, Ontario, Canada
- Died: October 8, 2008 (aged 74); Thunder Bay, Ontario, Canada
- Height: 6 ft 1 in (185 cm)
- Weight: 195 lb (88 kg; 13 st 13 lb)
- Position: Defence
- Shot: Left
- Played for: Detroit Red Wings; New York Rangers; Minnesota North Stars
- Playing career: 1956–1969

Peter John Goegan (March 6, 1934 – October 8, 2008) was a Canadian professional ice hockey defenceman who played 383 games in the National Hockey League (NHL) with the Detroit Red Wings, New York Rangers, and Minnesota North Stars between 1958 and 1968. Goegan recorded 20 goals and 70 assists during his NHL Career.

== Playing career ==
Goegan started playing hockey Fort William, Ontario, and then moved for two seasons to the Northern Ontario Hockey Association before joining professional hockey in 1956.

He played for two years in the American Hockey League (AHL) with the Cleveland Barons, winning a Calder Cup, but in the 1957–58 season he debuted in the NHL with the Detroit Red Wings. In the following seasons he became a defender for the Red Wings, except for a loan to the Edmonton Flyers of the Western Hockey League (WHL) during the 1959-60 championship.

In 1962 he played for a few months in the New York Rangers organization, winning another Calder Cup with the Springfield Indians farm team, but in October he returned to the Red Wings. He split five seasons between the Rangers and another AHL affiliate, the Pittsburgh Hornets, with whom he won the third Calder Cup in his career.

Goegan was selected in the 1967 NHL Expansion Draft by the Minnesota North Stars, with whom he played 46 games in addition to a WHL loan to the Phoenix Roadrunners. He retired a year later in 1969 after playing with the Baltimore Clippers and the Denver Spurs.

== Career statistics ==
=== Regular season and playoffs ===
			Regular season					Playoffs
Season	Team	League	GP	G	A	Pts	PIM	GP	G	A	Pts	PIM
1951–52	Fort William Canadians	TBJHL	29	2	6	8	84	—	—	—	—	—
1952–53	Fort William Canadians	TBJHL	21	12	11	23	108	6	2	1	3	14
1952–53	Fort William Canadians	M-Cup	—	—	—	—	—	5	1	1	2	26
1953–54	Fort William Canadians	TBJHL	23	4	11	15	147	4	1	3	4	8
1953–54	Fort William Canadians	M-Cup	—	—	—	—	—	13	1	0	1	33
1954–55	Fort William Beavers	NOHA	—	—	—	—	—	—	—	—	—	—
1954–55	Fort William Beavers	Al-Cup	—	—	—	—	—	13	4	1	5	33
1955–56	Sault Ste. Marie Indians	NOHA	59	6	21	27	104	7	2	1	3	6
1956–57	Cleveland Barons	AHL	51	3	17	20	121	11	0	0	0	30
1957–58	Cleveland Barons	AHL	55	6	17	23	94	—	—	—	—	—
1957–58	Detroit Red Wings	NHL	14	0	2	2	28	4	0	0	0	18
1958–59	Detroit Red Wings	NHL	67	1	11	12	109	—	—	—	—	—
1959–60	Detroit Red Wings	NHL	21	3	0	3	6	6	1	0	1	13
1959–60	Edmonton Flyers	WHL	40	11	16	27	107	—	—	—	—	—
1960–61	Detroit Red Wings	NHL	67	5	29	34	78	11	0	1	1	18
1961–62	Detroit Red Wings	NHL	39	5	5	10	24	—	—	—	—	—
1961–62	New York Rangers	NHL	7	0	2	2	6	—	—	—	—	—
1961–62	Springfield Indians	AHL	7	0	1	1	12	11	3	3	6	20
1962–63	Detroit Red Wings	NHL	62	1	8	9	48	11	0	2	2	12
1963–64	Detroit Red Wings	NHL	12	0	0	0	8	—	—	—	—	—
1963–64	Pittsburgh Hornets	AHL	55	6	17	23	127	5	0	0	0	6
1964–65	Detroit Red Wings	NHL	4	1	0	1	2	—	—	—	—	—
1964–65	Pittsburgh Hornets	AHL	68	9	14	23	163	2	0	0	0	2
1965–66	Detroit Red Wings	NHL	13	0	2	2	14	1	0	0	0	0
1965–66	Pittsburgh Hornets	AHL	52	4	17	21	85	—	—	—	—	—
1966–67	Detroit Red Wings	NHL	31	2	6	8	12	—	—	—	—	—
1966–67	Pittsburgh Hornets	AHL	34	4	16	20	60	9	1	5	6	17
1967–68	Minnesota North Stars	NHL	46	1	2	3	30	—	—	—	—	—
1967–68	Phoenix Roadrunners	WHL	15	2	5	7	18	4	0	0	0	0
1968–69	Denver Spurs	WHL	34	1	10	11	40	—	—	—	—	—
1968–69	Baltimore Clippers	AHL	25	0	4	4	30	4	0	1	1	0
AHL totals			347	32	103	135	692	42	4	9	13	75
NHL totals			383	19	67	86	365	33	1	3	4	61
