= Lou Fontinato =

Canadian ice hockey player (1932–2016)

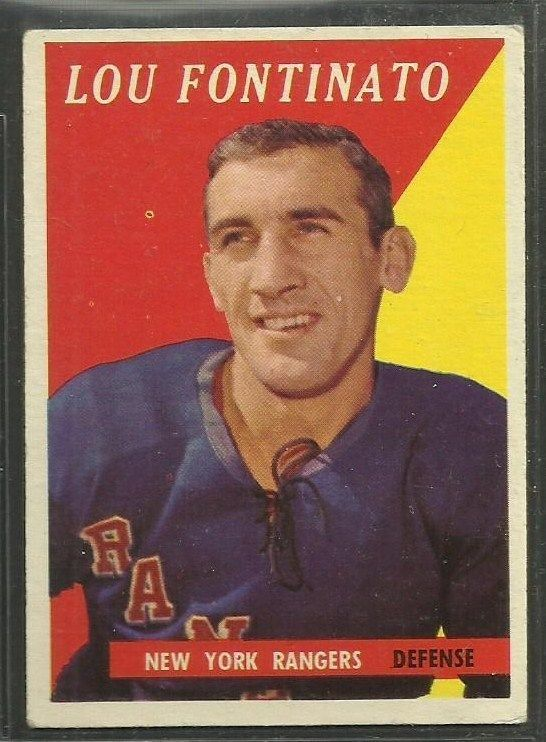
- Born: January 20, 1932 Guelph, Ontario, Canada
- Died: July 3, 2016 (aged 84) Guelph, Ontario, Canada
- Height: 6 ft 1 in (185 cm)
- Weight: 185 lb (84 kg; 13 st 3 lb)
- Position: Defence
- Shot: Left
- Played for: New York Rangers; Montreal Canadiens
- Playing career: 1954–1963

Louis Joseph "Leapin' Louie" Fontinato (January 20, 1932 – July 3, 2016) was a Canadian defenceman in the National Hockey League with the New York Rangers from 1954 to 1961 and the Montreal Canadiens from 1961 to 1963.

== NHL career ==
Lou Fontinato was a rugged defender and the most feared enforcer of his time. He started his career with New York during the 1954-55 season. The following year, he led the NHL in penalty minutes. Fontinato became the first player in league history to record over 200 minutes in penalties in a season. He also led the league in that category in 1957-58 and 1961–62 (with Montreal). With the Rangers, Fontinato and Gordie Howe had a running feud that culminated in a fight at Madison Square Garden on February 1, 1959, in which Howe broke the nose and dislocated the jaw of "Leapin' Lou". Fontinato was eventually traded to the Montreal Canadiens for Hall-of-Fame great Doug Harvey at the tail-end of his career. Fontinato's career came to an abrupt and violent end in 1963 at the Montreal Forum when he missed a check on left-winger Vic Hadfield of the Rangers behind the Montreal net, slammed head first into the boards, and became paralyzed for a month.

After his career ended, he returned to Guelph and worked as a farmer. He died in 2016 at the age of 84, leaving behind a son and a daughter.

== Career statistics ==
=== Regular season and playoffs ===
			Regular season					Playoffs
Season	Team	League	GP	G	A	Pts	PIM	GP	G	A	Pts	PIM
1949–50	Guelph Biltmores	OHA-B	—	—	—	—	—	—	—	—	—	—
1950–51	Guelph Biltmores	OHA	45	3	11	14	93	5	0	0	0	0
1951–52	Guelph Biltmores	OHA	48	6	25	31	0	—	—	—	—	—
1951–52	Guelph Biltmores	M-Cup	—	—	—	—	—	12	1	3	4	50
1952–53	Vancouver Canucks	WHL	65	3	18	21	169	9	1	3	4	12
1953–54	Vancouver Canucks	WHL	63	4	14	18	147	6	0	1	1	25
1954–55	Saskatoon Quakers	WHL	35	4	6	10	55	—	—	—	—	—
1954–55	New York Rangers	NHL	28	2	2	4	60	—	—	—	—	—
1955–56	New York Rangers	NHL	70	3	15	18	202	4	0	0	0	6
1956–57	New York Rangers	NHL	70	3	12	15	139	5	0	0	0	7
1957–58	New York Rangers	NHL	70	3	8	11	152	6	0	1	1	6
1958–59	New York Rangers	NHL	64	7	6	13	149	—	—	—	—	—
1959–60	New York Rangers	NHL	64	2	11	13	137	—	—	—	—	—
1960–61	New York Rangers	NHL	53	2	3	5	100	—	—	—	—	—
1961–62	Montreal Canadiens	NHL	54	2	13	15	167	6	0	1	1	23
1962–63	Montreal Canadiens	NHL	63	2	8	10	141	—	—	—	—	—
NHL totals			536	26	78	104	1247	21	0	2	2	42

== Personal life ==
Fontinato later ran a cattle operation near Eden Mills, Ontario. He died in Guelph, Ontario on July 3, 2016. Fontinato's great nephew, Greg McKegg, is also a professional ice hockey player.

== Legacy ==
In the 2009 book 100 Ranger Greats, the authors ranked Fontinato at No. 95 all-time of the 901 New York Rangers who had played during the team's first 82 seasons.

Gilles Groulx's 1964 National Film Board, 30-minute documentary film Un Jeu Si Simple includes footage of Lou Fontinato including his career-ending neck injury vs. NY Rangers on March 9, 1963.

In an email interview with Wayne Gretzky, Gordie Howe said a fight with Lou Fontinato was the most memorable of his career.
