= Ed Litzenberger =

Canadian ice hockey player

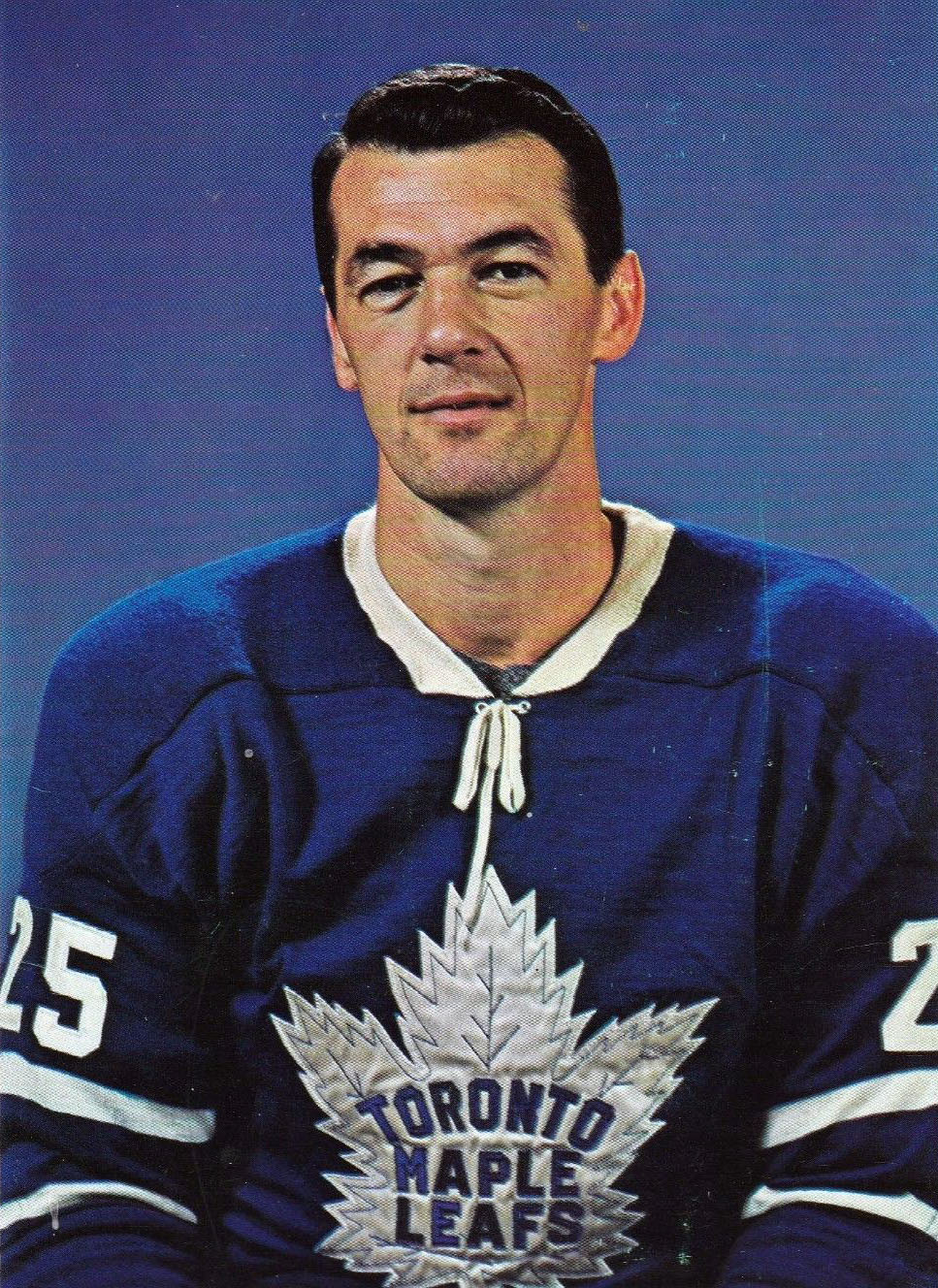
- Litzenberger with the Toronto Maple Leafs, c. 1963
- Born: July 15, 1932 Neudorf, Saskatchewan, Canada
- Died: November 1, 2010 (aged 78) Toronto, Ontario, Canada
- Height: 6 ft 1 in (185 cm)
- Weight: 174 lb (79 kg; 12 st 6 lb)
- Position: Centre/Right wing
- Shot: Right
- Played for: Montreal Canadiens; Chicago Black Hawks; Detroit Red Wings; Toronto Maple Leafs
- Playing career: 1952–1965

Edward Charles John Litzenberger (July 15, 1932 – November 1, 2010) was a Canadian ice hockey right winger from Neudorf, Saskatchewan. Litzenberger was "donated" to the Chicago Black Hawks by the Montreal Canadiens in his first year in the National Hockey League (NHL). At the time the Black Hawks were struggling to survive as a franchise, and the league governors decided to help the team remain viable.

== Playing career ==
Litzenberger began his hockey career with the Regina Pats in the Western Canada Junior Hockey League. In 1950–51, he led the league in scoring with 44 goals in 40 games and led the playoffs in scoring with 14 goals in 12 games. In 1952–53, he made his debut with the Montreal Canadiens, playing two games with the Canadiens while splitting his time with the Montreal Royals. He won the Rookie of the Year Award in the Quebec Senior Hockey League, and was chosen for the Second All-Star Team.

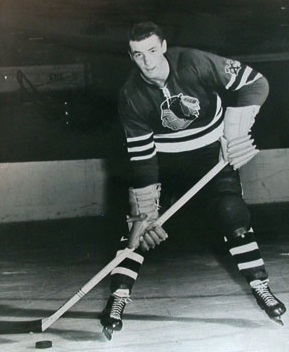
Litzenberger in the 1950s

After playing 29 games with the Canadiens, Litzenberger was traded to the Chicago Black Hawks in 1954–55. He posted 40 points in 44 games with the Black Hawks and was awarded the Calder Memorial Trophy. He also played in the NHL All-Star Game that year. With the teams having played an uneven number of games in the 70-game season at the time of the trade, Litzenberger broke the league record for games played in a single season with 73, a record he held until 1976, when the schedule was expanded to 76 games.

After posting three consecutive 30-goal seasons and being named to the NHL Second All-Star Team in 1956–57, he was named Captain of the Chicago Black Hawks in 1957–58. He led a Black Hawks team that included future Hall of Famers Bobby Hull, Stan Mikita, Pierre Pilote and Glenn Hall to a Stanley Cup championship in 1960–61, Chicago's first Stanley Cup since 1937–38.

Litzenberger was traded to the Detroit Red Wings after the Black Hawks had won the Stanley Cup, and traded again midway through the season to the Toronto Maple Leafs. He helped the Leafs win three consecutive Stanley Cups from 1962 to 1964. After that, he was sent down to the American Hockey League with the Rochester Americans and won the Calder Cup for two consecutive seasons with the Americans before retiring.

Litz was unique for having won four consecutive Stanley Cups while playing for two different teams. He helped instill a winning attitude as a member of the Black Hawks after having been traded from a first-place to a last-place team after noting a defeatist attitude among the players. Some of his teammates were satisfied with a tie. He reminded them that a tie was not a win and not worth celebrating.

He is also the only player in North American hockey history to win six straight pro hockey championships by winning the Stanley Cup in 1961, 1962, 1963 and 1964, and the Calder Cup in 1965 and 1966.

He spent his final years living in Ontario.

== Achievements ==
- QSHL Top Rookie of the Year Award winner in 1953.
- Selected to the QSHL Second All-Star Team in 1953.
- Selected to the QHL Second All-Star Team in 1954.
- Calder Memorial Trophy winner in 1955.
- Played in 1955, 1957, 1958, 1959, 1962, and 1963 NHL All-Star Games.
- Selected to the NHL Second All-Star Team in 1957.
- Stanley Cup champion in 1961 (Chicago Black Hawks).
- Stanley Cup champion in 1962, 1963 and 1964 (Toronto Maple Leafs).
- Calder Cup champion in 1965, and 1966 (Rochester Americans).

== Career statistics ==
=== Regular season and playoffs ===
			Regular season					Playoffs
Season	Team	League	GP	G	A	Pts	PIM	GP	G	A	Pts	PIM
1949–50	Regina Pats	WCJHL	40	25	19	44	16	9	11	4	15	4
1949–50	Regina Pats	M-Cup	—	—	—	—	—	14	12	10	22	2
1950–51	Regina Pats	WCJHL	40	44	35	79	23	12	14	16	30	6
1950–51	Regina Pats	M-Cup	—	—	—	—	—	17	12	10	22	14
1951–52	Regina Pats	WCJHL	41	42	29	71	75	8	8	5	13	8
1951–52	Regina Pats	M-Cup	—	—	—	—	—	14	14	12	26	12
1952–53	Montreal Canadiens	NHL	2	1	0	1	2	—	—	—	—	—
1952–53	Montreal Royals	QMHL	59	26	24	50	42	16	8	4	12	15
1953–54	Montreal Canadiens	NHL	3	0	0	0	0	—	—	—	—	—
1953–54	Montreal Royals	QHL	67	31	39	70	44	11	4	5	9	6
1954–55	Montreal Canadiens	NHL	29	7	4	11	12	—	—	—	—	—
1954–55	Chicago Black Hawks	NHL	44	16	24	40	28	—	—	—	—	—
1955–56	Chicago Black Hawks	NHL	70	10	29	39	36	—	—	—	—	—
1956–57	Chicago Black Hawks	NHL	70	32	32	64	48	—	—	—	—	—
1957–58	Chicago Black Hawks	NHL	70	32	30	62	63	—	—	—	—	—
1958–59	Chicago Black Hawks	NHL	70	33	44	77	37	6	3	5	8	8
1959–60	Chicago Black Hawks	NHL	52	12	18	30	15	4	0	1	1	4
1960–61	Chicago Black Hawks	NHL	62	10	22	32	14	10	1	3	4	2
1961–62	Detroit Red Wings	NHL	32	8	12	20	4	—	—	—	—	—
1961–62	Toronto Maple Leafs	NHL	37	10	10	20	14	10	0	2	2	4
1962–63	Toronto Maple Leafs	NHL	58	5	13	18	10	9	1	2	3	6
1963–64	Toronto Maple Leafs	NHL	19	2	0	2	0	1	0	0	0	10
1963–64	Rochester Americans	AHL	33	15	14	29	26	2	1	1	2	2
1964–65	Rochester Americans	AHL	72	25	61	86	34	10	1	3	4	6
1965–66	Victoria Maple Leafs	WHL	23	7	17	24	26	—	—	—	—	—
1965–66	Rochester Americans	AHL	47	7	15	22	10	12	1	5	6	8
NHL totals			618	178	238	416	283	40	5	13	18	34

== Death ==
Litzenberger, died on November 1, 2010, age 78.

Preceded by Camille Henry	Winner of the Calder Memorial Trophy; 1955	Succeeded by Glenn Hall
Preceded by Gus Mortson	Chicago Black Hawks captain 1958–61	Succeeded by Pierre Pilote
