= 1957 Stanley Cup Final =

1957 ice hockey championship series

	1	2	3	4	5	Total
Montreal Canadiens	5	1	4	0	5	4
Boston Bruins	1	0	2	2	1	1
- Location(s): Montreal: Montreal Forum (1, 2, 5); Boston: Boston Garden (3, 4)
- Coaches: Montreal: Toe Blake; Boston: Milt Schmidt
- Captains: Montreal: Maurice Richard; Boston: Fernie Flaman
- Dates: April 6–16, 1957
- Series-winning goal: Dickie Moore (0:14, second)
- Hall of Famers: Canadiens: Jean Beliveau (1972); Bernie Geoffrion (1972); Doug Harvey (1973); Tom Johnson (1970); Dickie Moore (1974); Bert Olmstead (1985); Jacques Plante (1978); Henri Richard (1979); Maurice Richard (1961); Bruins: Leo Boivin (1986); Fernie Flaman (1990); Allan Stanley (1981; did not play); Terry Sawchuk (1971; did not play); Coaches: Toe Blake (1966, player); Milt Schmidt (1961, player Officials: George Hayes (1988); Matt Pavelich (1987); Red Storey (1967); Frank Udvari (1973)

The 1957 Stanley Cup Final was the championship series of the National Hockey League's (NHL) 1956–57 season, and the culmination of the 1957 Stanley Cup playoffs. It was contested between the defending champion Montreal Canadiens and the Boston Bruins. The Canadiens were making their seventh consecutive Final appearance, while Boston was making their first appearance since their 1953 loss to Montreal. The Canadiens won the series, four games to one, for their second straight Cup victory.

== Paths to the Finals ==
Montreal defeated the New York Rangers 4–1 to reach the final. Boston defeated the Detroit Red Wings 4–1 to reach the final.

== Game summaries ==
=== Game one ===
April 6	Boston Bruins	1–5	Montreal Canadiens	Montreal Forum	Recap

Maurice Richard scored four times in game one, including three in the second period, to tie Ted Lindsay's record, set in 1955 for a winning Detroit team, and give the Canadiens a 1–0 lead in the series.

Scoring summary
Period	Team	Goal	Assist(s)	Time	Score
1st	None				
2nd	BOS	Fleming MacKell (2) – pp	Doug Mohns (3) and Larry Regan (1)	07:37	1–0 BOS
2nd	MTL	Maurice Richard (5)	Dickie Moore (13) and Tom Johnson (1)	10:39	1–1
2nd	MTL	Maurice Richard (6) – pp	Doug Harvey (3)	13:29	2–1 MTL
2nd	MTL	Bernie Geoffrion (8) – pp	Doug Harvey (4)	15:35	3–1 MTL
2nd	MTL	Maurice Richard (7)	Henri Richard (5) and Doug Harvey (4)	17:00	4–1 MTL
3rd	MTL	Maurice Richard (8)	Henri Richard (6)	18:17	5–1 MTL
Penalty summary
Period	Team	Player	Penalty	Time	PIM
1st	BOS	Jack Bionda	High-sticking	04:05	2:00
1st	MTL	Phil Goyette	Hooking	06:57	2:00
1st	BOS	Buddy Boone	Elbowing	11:53	2:00
1st	MTL	Jean Beliveau	High-sticking	13:17	2:00
2nd	MTL	Jean-Guy Talbot	Tripping	01:04	2:00
2nd	MTL	Bert Olmstead	Tripping	06:54	2:00
2nd	BOS	Larry Regan	High-sticking	08:02	2:00
2nd	BOS	Buddy Boone	Interference	11:54	2:00
2nd	BOS	Real Chevrefils	Tripping	13:52	2:00
3rd	None				

Shots by period
Team	1	2	3	Total
Boston	7	8	6	21
Montreal	9	16	16	41

=== Game two ===
April 9	Boston Bruins	0–1	Montreal Canadiens	Montreal Forum	Recap

Jean Beliveau scored the game winning goal early in the second period and Jacques Plante made 24 saves in a 1–0 victory for Montreal.

Scoring summary
Period	Team	Goal	Assist(s)	Time	Score
1st	None				
2nd	MTL	Jean Beliveau (6)	Dollard St. Laurent (1) and Bernie Geoffrion (6)	02:27	1–0 MTL
3rd	None				
Penalty summary
Period	Team	Player	Penalty	Time	PIM
1st	MTL	Jean Beliveau	Slashing	03:29	2:00
1st	BOS	Fernie Flaman	High-sticking	06:35	2:00
1st	MTL	Jean-Guy Talbot	Tripping	12:33	2:00
1st	BOS	Leo Labine	Tripping	13:50	2:00
1st	BOS	Vic Stasiuk	Spearing	14:41	2:00
1st	MTL	Doug Harvey	Spearing	14:41	2:00
1st	MTL	Henri Richard	Holding	17:39	2:00
2nd	MTL	Jean-Guy Talbot	Interference	03:51	2:00
2nd	BOS	Larry Regan	Tripping	04:23	2:00
2nd	BOS	Leo Labine	High-sticking	07:37	2:00
2nd	BOS	Jean Beliveau	High-sticking	07:37	2:00
3rd	None				

Shots by period
Team	1	2	3	Total
Boston	7	9	8	24
Montreal	6	6	11	23

=== Game three ===
April 14	Montreal Canadiens	4–2	Boston Bruins	Boston Garden	Recap

Bernie Geoffrion scored twice in game three in Boston as the Canadiens won the game 4–2, taking a 3–0 series lead.

Scoring summary
Period	Team	Goal	Assist(s)	Time	Score
1st	MTL	Bernie Geoffrion (9)	Doug Harvey (6) and Bert Olmstead (8)	01:30	1–0 MTL
1st	MTL	Floyd Curry (2)	Phil Goyette (1)	14:39	2–0 MTL
1st	MTL	Bernie Geoffrion (10) – pp	Jean Beliveau (6)	19:54	3–0 MTL
2nd	BOS	Don McKenney (1)	Bob Armstrong (3)	06:16	3–1 MTL
3rd	MTL	Phil Goyette (2)	Donnie Marshall (2) and Floyd Curry (1)	07:31	4–1 MTL
3rd	BOS	Fleming MacKell (3)	Fernie Flaman (3)	19:16	4–2 MTL
Penalty summary
Period	Team	Player	Penalty	Time	PIM
1st	MTL	Dickie Moore	Elbowing	04:48	2:00
1st	MTL	Doug Harvey	Tripping	05:35	2:00
1st	BOS	Buddy Boone	Interference	09:06	2:00
1st	BOS	Buddy Boone	Roughing	09:06	2:00
1st	MTL	Bernie Geoffrion	Roughing	09:06	2:00
1st	MTL	Tom Johnson	Holding	15:33	2:00
1st	BOS	Bob Armstrong	Charging	18:36	2:00
2nd	BOS	Leo Boivin	Kneeing	01:39	2:00
3rd	BOS	Leo Labine	Slashing	09:22	2:00

Shots by period
Team	1	2	3	Total
Montreal	7	6	12	25
Boston	8	10	9	27

=== Game four ===
April 11	Montreal Canadiens	0–2	Boston Bruins	Boston Garden	Recap

Fleming MacKell both goals for Boston in game four and Don Simmons stopped all 21 shots he faced to record his second shutout of the postseason, and Boston forced a game five back in Montreal.

Scoring summary
Period	Team	Goal	Assist(s)	Time	Score
1st	BOS	Fleming MacKell (4) – pp	Jerry Toppazzini (1) and Larry Regan (2)	02:56	1–0 BOS
2nd	None				
3rd	BOS	Fleming MacKell (5) – en	Don McKenney (5) and Leo Labine (2)	02:56	2–0 BOS
Penalty summary
Period	Team	Player	Penalty	Time	PIM
1st	BOS	Leo Labine	High-sticking	02:02	2:00
1st	MTL	Donnie Marshall	High-sticking	02:02	2:00
1st	MTL	Dollard St. Laurent	High-sticking	02:47	2:00
1st	BOS	Leo Boivin	Holding	03:22	2:00
1st	BOS	Jerry Toppazzini	Charging	05:26	2:00
1st	BOS	Jack Bionda	Cross-checking	17:23	2:00
1st	BOS	Fernie Flaman	Roughing	19:31	2:00
1st	MTL	Henri Richard	Roughing	19:31	2:00
2nd	MTL	Maurice Richard	Hooking	08:59	2:00
3rd	None				

Shots by period
Team	1	2	3	Total
Montreal	9	8	4	21
Boston	6	8	15	27

=== Game five ===
April 16	Boston Bruins	1–5	Montreal Canadiens	Montreal Forum	Recap

Dickie Moore scored the game winning goal early in the second period of game five and Jacques Plante stood tall, making 27 saves. Montreal won the game 5–1, to win second consecutive Stanley Cup.

Scoring summary
Period	Team	Goal	Assist(s)	Time	Score
1st	MTL	Andre Pronovost (1)	Claude Provost (1) and Donnie Marshall (3)	18:11	1–0 MTL
2nd	MTL	Dickie Moore (3) – pp	Bernie Geoffrion (7) and Doug Harvey (7)	00:14	2–0 MTL
2nd	MTL	Bernie Geoffrion (11)	Bert Olmstead (9) and Tom Johnson (2)	15:12	3–0 MTL
3rd	BOS	Leo Labine (3)	Leo Boivin (3)	13:43	3–1 MTL
3rd	MTL	Donnie Marshall (1)	Dickie Moore (6) and Floyd Curry (2)	17:38	4–1 MTL
3rd	MTL	Floyd Curry (3)	Dickie Moore (7) and Connie Broden (1)	18:31	5–1 MTL
Penalty summary
Period	Team	Player	Penalty	Time	PIM
1st	BOS	Leo Labine	High-sticking	00:56	2:00
1st	MTL	Henri Richard	High-sticking	02:44	2:00
1st	BOS	Buddy Boone	Elbowing	11:24	2:00
1st	MTL	Dollard St. Laurent	Elbowing	11:24	2:00
1st	MTL	Doug Harvey	Hooking	13:20	2:00
1st	BOS	Fernie Flaman	Spearing	19:18	2:00
1st	BOS	Fernie Flaman	Fighting – major	19:18	5:00
1st	BOS	Leo Labine	Roughing	19:18	2:00
1st	MTL	Bert Olmstead	Roughing	19:18	2:00
1st	MTL	Bert Olmstead	Fighting – major	19:18	5:00
2nd	BOS	Jack Bionda	Tripping	02:20	2:00
2nd	BOS	Johnny Peirson	High-sticking	07:52	2:00
2nd	MTL	Dollard St. Laurent	High-sticking – major	07:52	5:00
2nd	BOS	Fernie Flaman	Hooking	09:26	2:00
3rd	MTL	Henri Richard	Tripping	02:20	2:00
3rd	BOS	Fleming MacKell	High-sticking	10:55	2:00
3rd	MTL	Andre Pronovost	Slashing	10:55	2:00
3rd	BOS	Johnny Peirson	Misconduct	20:00	10:00

Shots by period
Team	1	2	3	Total
Boston	13	7	8	28
Montreal	8	12	14	34

== Stanley Cup engraving ==
The 1957 Stanley Cup was presented to Canadiens captain Maurice Richard by NHL President Clarence Campbell following the Canadiens 5–1 win over the Bruins in game five.

The following Canadiens players and staff had their names engraved on the Stanley Cup

1956–57 Montreal Canadiens

=== Players ===
Centres

- 4 Jean Beliveau
- 16 Henri Richard
- 20 Phil Goyette
- 24 Connie Broden

Wingers

- 5 Bernie Geoffrion
- 6 Floyd Curry (A)
- 9 Maurice "Rocket" Richard (Captain)
- 12 Dickie Moore
- 14 Claude Provost
- 15 Bert Olmstead
- 22 Don Marshall
- 23 Andre Pronovost

Defencemen

- 2 Doug Harvey (A)
- 10 Tom Johnson (A)
- 11 Bob Turner
- 17 Jean-Guy Talbot
- 19 Dollard St. Laurent

Goaltenders

- 1 Jacques Plante
- 1 Gerry McNeil (Sub)

=== Coaching and administrative staff ===
- William Northey (President/Owner), Donat Raymond (Chairman/Owner)
- Ken Reardon (Vice President), Frank Selke Sr. (Manager)
- Toe Blake (Coach)
- Hector Dubois (Trainer), Larry Aubut (Asst. Trainer)
- Camile DesRoches^, Frank Selke Jr.^ (Publicity Directors)
- ^- on the team picture, but missing from the Stanley Cup.
- #8 Jack LeClair played 47 games for Montreal. His name was not included on the Cup, because LeClair was playing in the minors during the playoffs.
- Dalton C. Colemen left the Montreal Canadiens before the start of the 1957 season.
- After the 1956-57 season, the NHL decided to change the look of the Stanley Cup, so the 1957 Montreal Canadiens were not engraved until 1958.

== See also ==
- 1956–57 NHL season

== Notes ==
Preceded by Montreal Canadiens; 1956	Montreal Canadiens; Stanley Cup champions 1957	Succeeded by Montreal Canadiens; 1958
