= 1956–57 Boston Bruins season =

NHL team season

1956–57 Boston Bruins
- League: 3rd place on NHL NHL
- 1956–57 record: 34–24–12
- Home record: 20–9–6
- Road record: 14–15–6
- Goals for: 195
- Goals against: 174

Team information
- General manager: Lynn Patrick
- Coach: Milt Schmidt
- Captain: Fernie Flaman
- Arena: Boston Garden

Team leaders
- Goals: Real Chevrefils (31 goals)
- Assists: Don McKenney (39 assists)
- Points: Don McKenney (60 points)
- Penalty minutes: Leo Labine (128)
- Wins: Terry Sawchuk (18 wins)
- Goals against average: Terry Sawchuk (2.38%)

The 1956–57 Boston Bruins season was 40th Season of the National Hockey League (NHL). The team finished with a record of 34 wins, 24 losses, and 12 wins on overtime. Their record earned them the third seed in the Stanley Cup playoffs, where they lost to the Montreal Canadiens in the final. With 21 goals and 39 assists, Center Don McKenney was the team's leading scorer.

== Regular season ==
=== Final standings ===
National Hockey League
		GP	W	L	T	GF	GA	DIFF	Pts
1	Detroit Red Wings	70	38	20	12	198	157	+41	88
2	Montreal Canadiens	70	35	23	12	210	155	+55	82
3	Boston Bruins	70	34	24	12	195	174	+21	80
4	New York Rangers	70	26	30	14	184	227	−43	66
5	Toronto Maple Leafs	70	21	34	15	174	192	−18	57
6	Chicago Black Hawks	70	16	39	15	169	225	−56	47

=== Record vs. opponents ===
1956–57 NHL Records
Team	BOS	CHI	DET	MTL	NYR	TOR
Boston	—	8–5–1	7–4–3	7–4–3	5–8–1	7–3–4
Chicago	5–8–1	—	2–10–2	3–8–3	1–7–6	5–6–3
Detroit	4–7–3	10–2–2	—	4–6–4	10–3–1	10–2–2
Montreal	4–7–3	8–3–3	6–4–4	—	8–5–1	9–4–1
New York	8–5–1	7–1–6	3–10–1	5–8–1	—	3–6–5
Toronto	3–7–4	6–5–3	2–10–2	4–9–1	6–3–5	—

== Schedule and results ==
1956–57 regular season
October

Game	Result	Date	Score	Opponent	Record
1	T	October 11, 1956	4–4	Toronto Maple Leafs (1956–57)	0–0–1
2	L	October 13, 1956	0–3	@ Montreal Canadiens (1956–57)	0–1–1
3	W	October 14, 1956	3–1	Montreal Canadiens (1956–57)	1–1–1
4	L	October 17, 1956	0–2	@ New York Rangers (1956–57)	1–2–1
5	T	October 20, 1956	2–2	@ Toronto Maple Leafs (1956–57)	1–2–2
6	T	October 21, 1956	3–3	@ Detroit Red Wings (1956–57)	1–2–3
7	W	October 27, 1956	1–0	@ Montreal Canadiens (1956–57)	2–2–3
8	L	October 30, 1956	0–4	@ Chicago Black Hawks (1956–57)	2–3–3

November

Game	Result	Date	Score	Opponent	Record
9	W	November 1, 1956	5–2	Chicago Black Hawks (1956–57)	3–3–3
10	W	November 4, 1956	4–1	New York Rangers (1956–57)	4–3–3
11	W	November 7, 1956	4–2	@ New York Rangers (1956–57)	5–3–3
12	W	November 8, 1956	3–1	Detroit Red Wings (1956–57)	6–3–3
13	W	November 10, 1956	3–1	@ Montreal Canadiens (1956–57)	7–3–3
14	W	November 11, 1956	3–2	Montreal Canadiens (1956–57)	8–3–3
15	W	November 15, 1956	5–3	@ Chicago Black Hawks (1956–57)	9–3–3
16	T	November 17, 1956	4–4	@ New York Rangers (1956–57)	9–3–4
17	W	November 18, 1956	4–3	Toronto Maple Leafs (1956–57)	10–3–4
18	L	November 22, 1956	3–4	New York Rangers (1956–57)	10–4–4
19	W	November 24, 1956	3–2	@ Toronto Maple Leafs (1956–57)	11–4–4
20	W	November 25, 1956	3–1	Toronto Maple Leafs (1956–57)	12–4–4
21	L	November 28, 1956	1–2	@ New York Rangers (1956–57)	12–5–4
22	W	November 29, 1956	2–0	@ Chicago Black Hawks (1956–57)	13–5–4

December

Game	Result	Date	Score	Opponent	Record
23	W	December 2, 1956	3–2	Chicago Black Hawks (1956–57)	14–5–4
24	L	December 6, 1956	2–3	@ Detroit Red Wings (1956–57)	14–6–4
25	W	December 8, 1956	5–3	Detroit Red Wings (1956–57)	15–6–4
26	T	December 9, 1956	1–1	Montreal Canadiens (1956–57)	15–6–5
27	W	December 13, 1956	3–2	Chicago Black Hawks (1956–57)	16–6–5
28	L	December 15, 1956	4–6	@ Montreal Canadiens (1956–57)	16–7–5
29	W	December 16, 1956	4–2	Toronto Maple Leafs (1956–57)	17–7–5
30	T	December 20, 1956	1–1	Detroit Red Wings (1956–57)	17–7–6
31	W	December 22, 1956	3–2	@ Toronto Maple Leafs (1956–57)	18–7–6
32	L	December 23, 1956	1–4	@ Chicago Black Hawks (1956–57)	18–8–6
33	L	December 25, 1956	2–4	Chicago Black Hawks (1956–57)	18–9–6
34	L	December 27, 1956	3–5	Detroit Red Wings (1956–57)	18–10–6
35	W	December 30, 1956	4–2	@ Detroit Red Wings (1956–57)	19–10–6

January

Game	Result	Date	Score	Opponent	Record
36	W	January 1, 1957	5–3	New York Rangers (1956–57)	20–10–6
37	L	January 5, 1957	2–3	@ Toronto Maple Leafs (1956–57)	20–11–6
38	T	January 6, 1957	4–4	@ Chicago Black Hawks (1956–57)	20–11–7
39	W	January 10, 1957	2–1	@ Detroit Red Wings (1956–57)	21–11–7
40	L	January 12, 1957	1–4	@ Montreal Canadiens (1956–57)	21–12–7
41	L	January 13, 1957	1–3	Montreal Canadiens (1956–57)	21–13–7
42	T	January 17, 1957	2–2	Detroit Red Wings (1956–57)	21–13–8
43	L	January 19, 1957	1–4	@ Toronto Maple Leafs (1956–57)	21–14–8
44	L	January 20, 1957	2–3	Toronto Maple Leafs (1956–57)	21–15–8
45	L	January 26, 1957	3–5	New York Rangers (1956–57)	21–16–8
46	W	January 27, 1957	5–2	Montreal Canadiens (1956–57)	22–16–8
47	W	January 31, 1957	2–0	Chicago Black Hawks (1956–57)	23–16–8

February

Game	Result	Date	Score	Opponent	Record
48	W	February 2, 1957	2–1	@ Montreal Canadiens (1956–57)	24–16–8
49	W	February 3, 1957	4–1	New York Rangers (1956–57)	25–16–8
50	L	February 6, 1957	2–3	@ New York Rangers (1956–57)	25–17–8
51	W	February 7, 1957	1–0	@ Detroit Red Wings (1956–57)	26–17–8
52	T	February 9, 1957	2–2	Montreal Canadiens (1956–57)	26–17–9
53	W	February 10, 1957	5–1	Toronto Maple Leafs (1956–57)	27–17–9
54	T	February 13, 1957	2–2	@ Toronto Maple Leafs (1956–57)	27–17–10
55	L	February 16, 1957	5–6	@ Chicago Black Hawks (1956–57)	27–18–10
56	L	February 17, 1957	2–6	@ Detroit Red Wings (1956–57)	27–19–10
57	L	February 20, 1957	2–5	@ New York Rangers (1956–57)	27–20–10
58	W	February 23, 1957	5–2	@ Toronto Maple Leafs (1956–57)	28–20–10
59	L	February 24, 1957	3–4	@ Chicago Black Hawks (1956–57)	28–21–10
60	W	February 28, 1957	4–0	Chicago Black Hawks (1956–57)	29–21–10

March

Game	Result	Date	Score	Opponent	Record
61	L	March 2, 1957	2–3	New York Rangers (1956–57)	29–22–10
62	W	March 3, 1957	5–2	Montreal Canadiens (1956–57)	30–22–10
63	L	March 7, 1957	2–4	Detroit Red Wings (1956–57)	30–23–10
64	W	March 9, 1957	4–2	Detroit Red Wings (1956–57)	31–23–10
65	T	March 10, 1957	3–3	Toronto Maple Leafs (1956–57)	31–23–11
66	W	March 13, 1957	2–1	@ New York Rangers (1956–57)	32–23–11
67	T	March 16, 1957	2–2	@ Montreal Canadiens (1956–57)	32–23–12
68	W	March 17, 1957	6–2	Chicago Black Hawks (1956–57)	33–23–12
69	W	March 21, 1957	2–0	@ Detroit Red Wings (1956–57)	34–23–12
70	L	March 23, 1957	2–4	New York Rangers (1956–57)	34–24–12

Legend: Win (2 points) Loss (0 points) Tie (1 point)

== Playoffs ==
See 1957 Stanley Cup Finals.

Semifinals
1	Detroit Red Wings	1
3	Boston Bruins	4
2	Montreal Canadiens	4
4	New York Rangers	1

Stanley Cup Finals
3	Boston Bruins	1
2	Montreal Canadiens	4

The Boston Bruins were seeded third in the Stanley Cup Semi-finals, where they defeated the top seeded Detroit Red Wings 4–1. In the Stanley Cup Finals, the Bruins were defeated by the Montreal Canadiens 4–1.

== Player statistics ==
=== Regular season ===
Scoring

Player	Pos	GP	G	A	Pts	PIM
Don McKenney	C	69	21	39	60	31
Real Chevrefils	LW	70	31	17	48	38
Leo Labine	RW	67	18	29	47	128
Vic Stasiuk	LW	64	24	16	40	69
Doug Mohns	LW/D	68	6	34	40	89
Fleming MacKell	C	65	22	17	39	73
Johnny Peirson	RW	68	13	26	39	41
Jerry Toppazzini	RW	55	15	23	38	26
Larry Regan	RW	69	14	19	33	29
Cal Gardner	C	70	12	20	32	66
Fern Flaman	D	68	6	25	31	108
Allan Stanley	D	60	6	25	31	45
Bob Armstrong	D	57	1	15	16	79
Leo Boivin	D	55	2	8	10	55
Jack Bionda	D	35	2	3	5	43
Jack Caffery	C	47	2	2	4	20
Bob Beckett	C	18	0	3	3	2
Al Nicholson	LW	5	0	1	1	0
Dick Cherry	D	6	0	0	0	4
Norm Defelice	G	10	0	0	0	2
Floyd Hillman	D	6	0	0	0	10
Ed Panagabko	C	1	0	0	0	0
George Ranieri	LW	2	0	0	0	0
Terry Sawchuk	G	34	0	0	0	14
Don Simmons	G	26	0	0	0	0
Floyd Smith	RW	23	0	0	0	6

Goaltending

Player	MIN	GP	W	L	T	GA	GAA	SO
Terry Sawchuk	2040	34	18	10	6	81	2.38	2
Don Simmons	1560	26	13	9	4	63	2.42	4
Norm Defelice	600	10	3	5	2	30	3.00	0
Team:	4200	70	34	24	12	174	2.49	6

=== Playoffs ===
Scoring

Player	Pos	GP	G	A	Pts	PIM
Fleming MacKell	C	10	5	3	8	4
Don McKenney	C	10	1	5	6	4
Leo Labine	RW	10	3	2	5	14
Leo Boivin	D	10	2	3	5	12
Doug Mohns	LW/D	10	2	3	5	2
Real Chevrefils	LW	10	2	1	3	4
Cal Gardner	C	10	2	1	3	2
Vic Stasiuk	LW	10	2	1	3	2
Bob Armstrong	D	10	0	3	3	10
Fern Flaman	D	10	0	3	3	19
Johnny Peirson	RW	10	0	3	3	12
Larry Regan	RW	8	0	2	2	10
Buddy Boone	RW	10	1	0	1	12
Jack Caffery	C	10	1	0	1	4
Jack Bionda	D	10	0	1	1	14
Jerry Toppazzini	RW	10	0	1	1	2
Don Simmons	G	10	0	0	0	0

Goaltending

Player	MIN	GP	W	L	GA	GAA	SO
Don Simmons	600	10	5	5	29	2.90	2
Team:	600	10	5	5	29	2.90	2

Note:

Pos = Position;GP = Games played; G = Goals; A = Assists; Pts = Points; PIM = Penalty minutes; +/- = Plus/minus; PPG = Power-play goals; SHG = Short-handed goals; GWG = Game-winning goals
Pos = Position;GP = Games played; Min, TOI = Minutes played; W = Wins; L = Losses; T,T/OT = Ties; OTL = Overtime losses; GA = Goals-against; GAA = Goals-against average; SO = Shutouts; SA = Shots against; SV = Shots saved;SV% = Save percentage;

== Awards and records ==
26-year-old RW Larry Regan was awarded the Calder Memorial Trophy as the Rookie of the Year.

== Farm teams ==
- Hershey Bears
- Victoria Cougars
- Quebec Aces

== See also ==
- 1956–57 NHL season
