= Jack Caffery =

Jack or John Caffery may refer to:

- Jack Caffery (runner) (1879–1919), Canadian track and field athlete
- Jack Caffery (ice hockey) (1934—1992), Canadian ice hockey player
- Capt. John Caffery (died 1811) of the Donelson family, American merchant
- DI Jack Caffery, a fictional British police detective
