= 1956–57 Detroit Red Wings season =

Sports season

1956–57 Detroit Red Wings
- League: 1st NHL
- 1956–57 record: 38–20–12
- Home record: 23–7–5
- Road record: 15–13–7
- Goals for: 198
- Goals against: 157

Team information
- General manager: Jack Adams
- Coach: Jimmy Skinner
- Captain: Red Kelly
- Alternate captains: Gordie Howe
- Arena: Detroit Olympia

Team leaders
- Goals: Gordie Howe (44)
- Assists: Ted Lindsay (55)
- Points: Gordie Howe (89)
- Penalty minutes: Ted Lindsay (103); Warren Godfrey (103)
- Wins: Glenn Hall (38)
- Goals against average: Glenn Hall (2.21)

The 1956–1957 Detroit Red Wings were one of six teams in the 40th season of the National Hockey League. The team finished with a record of 38 wins, 20 losses, and 12 ties, giving the Red Wings the best record in the regular season and the Prince of Wales Trophy. Their record earned the Red Wings first seed in the 1957 Stanley Cup Semi-finals, where Detroit lost their playoff series with the Boston Bruins 4–1.

Gordie Howe led the NHL in both goals scored (44) and points overall (89), beating fellow Red Wing Ted Lindsay by four points. Howe also won the Art Ross Trophy and Hart Memorial Trophy.

== Final standings ==
National Hockey League
		GP	W	L	T	GF	GA	DIFF	Pts
1	Detroit Red Wings	70	38	20	12	198	157	+41	88
2	Montreal Canadiens	70	35	23	12	210	155	+55	82
3	Boston Bruins	70	34	24	12	195	174	+21	80
4	New York Rangers	70	26	30	14	184	227	−43	66
5	Toronto Maple Leafs	70	21	34	15	174	192	−18	57
6	Chicago Black Hawks	70	16	39	15	169	225	−56	47

=== Record vs. opponents ===
1956–57 NHL Records
Team	BOS	CHI	DET	MTL	NYR	TOR
Boston	—	8–5–1	7–4–3	7–4–3	5–8–1	7–3–4
Chicago	5–8–1	—	2–10–2	3–8–3	1–7–6	5–6–3
Detroit	4–7–3	10–2–2	—	4–6–4	10–3–1	10–2–2
Montreal	4–7–3	8–3–3	6–4–4	—	8–5–1	9–4–1
New York	8–5–1	7–1–6	3–10–1	5–8–1	—	3–6–5
Toronto	3–7–4	6–5–3	2–10–2	4–9–1	6–3–5	—

== Schedule and results ==
1956–57 regular season
October

Game	Result	Date	Score	Opponent	Record
1	W	October 11, 1956	3–1	Chicago Black Hawks (1956–57)	1–0–0
2	W	October 13, 1956	4–1	@ Toronto Maple Leafs (1956–57)	2–0–0
3	W	October 14, 1956	2–1	New York Rangers (1956–57)	3–0–0
4	T	October 18, 1956	3–3	Toronto Maple Leafs (1956–57)	3–0–1
5	T	October 21, 1956	3–3	Boston Bruins (1956–57)	3–0–2
6	W	October 25, 1956	3–1	Chicago Black Hawks (1956–57)	4–0–2
7	W	October 28, 1956	4–1	Montreal Canadiens (1956–57)	5–0–2

November

Game	Result	Date	Score	Opponent	Record
8	L	November 1, 1956	3–4	@ Montreal Canadiens (1956–57)	5–1–2
9	W	November 3, 1956	2–1	@ Toronto Maple Leafs (1956–57)	6–1–2
10	L	November 8, 1956	1–3	@ Boston Bruins (1956–57)	6–2–2
11	W	November 10, 1956	6–4	@ New York Rangers (1956–57)	7–2–2
12	W	November 11, 1956	3–1	@ Chicago Black Hawks (1956–57)	8–2–2
13	W	November 15, 1956	4–2	Toronto Maple Leafs (1956–57)	9–2–2
14	L	November 17, 1956	2–6	@ Montreal Canadiens (1956–57)	9–3–2
15	W	November 18, 1956	8–3	Montreal Canadiens (1956–57)	10–3–2
16	T	November 22, 1956	2–2	Toronto Maple Leafs (1956–57)	10–3–3
17	W	November 24, 1956	3–2	Chicago Black Hawks (1956–57)	11–3–3
18	T	November 25, 1956	3–3	@ Chicago Black Hawks (1956–57)	11–3–4
19	W	November 29, 1956	4–1	New York Rangers (1956–57)	12–3–4

December

Game	Result	Date	Score	Opponent	Record
20	L	December 1, 1956	0–4	@ Toronto Maple Leafs (1956–57)	12–4–4
21	W	December 2, 1956	1–0	Montreal Canadiens (1956–57)	13–4–4
22	W	December 6, 1956	3–2	Boston Bruins (1956–57)	14–4–4
23	L	December 8, 1956	3–5	@ Boston Bruins (1956–57)	14–5–4
24	L	December 9, 1956	2–4	@ New York Rangers (1956–57)	14–6–4
25	W	December 13, 1956	2–1	New York Rangers (1956–57)	15–6–4
26	W	December 15, 1956	5–1	Chicago Black Hawks (1956–57)	16–6–4
27	L	December 16, 1956	1–3	@ Chicago Black Hawks (1956–57)	16–7–4
28	T	December 20, 1956	1–1	@ Boston Bruins (1956–57)	16–7–5
29	T	December 22, 1956	1–1	@ Montreal Canadiens (1956–57)	16–7–6
30	T	December 23, 1956	3–3	Montreal Canadiens (1956–57)	16–7–7
31	W	December 25, 1956	8–1	New York Rangers (1956–57)	17–7–7
32	W	December 27, 1956	5–3	@ Boston Bruins (1956–57)	18–7–7
33	L	December 30, 1956	2–4	Boston Bruins (1956–57)	18–8–7
34	W	December 31, 1956	1–0	@ New York Rangers (1956–57)	19–8–7

January

Game	Result	Date	Score	Opponent	Record
35	W	January 2, 1957	2–0	@ Toronto Maple Leafs (1956–57)	20–8–7
36	L	January 5, 1957	0–1	@ Montreal Canadiens (1956–57)	20–9–7
37	W	January 6, 1957	2–1	Toronto Maple Leafs (1956–57)	21–9–7
38	L	January 10, 1957	1–2	Boston Bruins (1956–57)	21–10–7
39	L	January 12, 1957	4–5	New York Rangers (1956–57)	21–11–7
40	W	January 13, 1957	3–2	@ New York Rangers (1956–57)	22–11–7
41	T	January 17, 1957	2–2	@ Boston Bruins (1956–57)	22–11–8
42	W	January 19, 1957	3–2	@ Chicago Black Hawks (1956–57)	23–11–8
43	W	January 20, 1957	5–2	New York Rangers (1956–57)	24–11–8
44	W	January 24, 1957	6–2	Chicago Black Hawks (1956–57)	25–11–8
45	W	January 26, 1957	4–1	@ Toronto Maple Leafs (1956–57)	26–11–8
46	W	January 27, 1957	3–1	Toronto Maple Leafs (1956–57)	27–11–8
47	L	January 31, 1957	3–5	@ Montreal Canadiens (1956–57)	27–12–8

February

Game	Result	Date	Score	Opponent	Record
48	W	February 2, 1957	5–4	@ New York Rangers (1956–57)	28–12–8
49	T	February 3, 1957	3–3	Montreal Canadiens (1956–57)	28–12–9
50	L	February 7, 1957	0–1	Boston Bruins (1956–57)	28–13–9
51	W	February 9, 1957	3–0	Chicago Black Hawks (1956–57)	29–13–9
52	T	February 10, 1957	2–2	@ Chicago Black Hawks (1956–57)	29–13–10
53	W	February 14, 1957	3–2	New York Rangers (1956–57)	30–13–10
54	W	February 16, 1957	3–1	@ Toronto Maple Leafs (1956–57)	31–13–10
55	W	February 17, 1957	6–2	Boston Bruins (1956–57)	32–13–10
56	T	February 21, 1957	3–3	@ Montreal Canadiens (1956–57)	32–13–11
57	L	February 23, 1957	3–4	@ Chicago Black Hawks (1956–57)	32–14–11
58	L	February 24, 1957	1–2	Toronto Maple Leafs (1956–57)	32–15–11
59	L	February 28, 1957	0–3	Montreal Canadiens (1956–57)	32–16–11

March

Game	Result	Date	Score	Opponent	Record
60	L	March 2, 1957	1–5	@ Montreal Canadiens (1956–57)	32–17–11
61	T	March 3, 1957	1–1	@ New York Rangers (1956–57)	32–17–12
62	W	March 7, 1957	4–2	@ Boston Bruins (1956–57)	33–17–12
63	L	March 9, 1957	2–4	@ Boston Bruins (1956–57)	33–18–12
64	L	March 10, 1957	1–4	@ New York Rangers (1956–57)	33–19–12
65	W	March 12, 1957	4–3	@ Chicago Black Hawks (1956–57)	34–19–12
66	W	March 14, 1957	3–2	Chicago Black Hawks (1956–57)	35–19–12
67	W	March 17, 1957	2–1	Montreal Canadiens (1956–57)	36–19–12
68	L	March 21, 1957	0–2	Boston Bruins (1956–57)	36–20–12
69	W	March 23, 1957	5–3	@ Toronto Maple Leafs (1956–57)	37–20–12
70	W	March 24, 1957	4–1	Toronto Maple Leafs (1956–57)	38–20–12

Legend: Win (2 points) Loss (0 points) Tie (1 point)

== Player statistics ==
=== Regular season ===
Scoring

Player	Pos	GP	G	A	Pts	PIM
Gordie Howe	RW	70	44	45	89	72
Ted Lindsay	LW	70	30	55	85	103
Norm Ullman	C	64	16	36	52	47
Alex Delvecchio	C/LW	48	16	25	41	8
Dutch Reibel	C	70	13	23	36	6
Red Kelly	D/C	70	10	25	35	18
Billy Dea	LW	69	15	15	30	14
Lorne Ferguson	LW	70	13	10	23	26
Metro Prystai	C	70	7	15	22	16
John Bucyk	LW	66	10	11	21	41
Marcel Pronovost	D	70	7	9	16	38
Marty Pavelich	LW	64	3	13	16	48
Billy McNeill	RW	64	5	10	15	34
Bill Dineen	RW	51	6	7	13	12
Warren Godfrey	D	69	1	8	9	103
Al Arbour	D	44	1	6	7	38
Larry Hillman	D	16	1	2	3	4
Gord Hollingworth	D	25	0	1	1	16
Dale Anderson	D	13	0	0	0	6
Murray Costello	C	3	0	0	0	0
Glenn Hall	G	70	0	0	0	2
Tom McCarthy	LW	3	0	0	0	0
Gord Strate	D	5	0	0	0	4

Goaltending

Player	MIN	GP	W	L	T	GA	GAA	SO
Glenn Hall	4200	70	38	20	12	155	2.21	4
Team:	4200	70	38	20	12	155	2.21	4

=== Playoffs ===
Scoring

Player	Pos	GP	G	A	Pts	PIM
Gordie Howe	RW	5	2	5	7	6
Ted Lindsay	LW	5	2	4	6	8
Alex Delvecchio	C/LW	5	3	2	5	2
Billy Dea	LW	5	2	0	2	2
Metro Prystai	C	5	2	0	2	0
Norm Ullman	C	5	1	1	2	6
Bob Bailey	RW	5	0	2	2	2
Dutch Reibel	C	5	0	2	2	0
Lorne Ferguson	LW	5	1	0	1	6
Red Kelly	D/C	5	1	0	1	0
John Bucyk	LW	5	0	1	1	0
Dale Anderson	D	2	0	0	0	0
Al Arbour	D	5	0	0	0	6
Bill Dineen	RW	4	0	0	0	0
Warren Godfrey	D	5	0	0	0	6
Glenn Hall	G	5	0	0	0	10
Marty Pavelich	LW	5	0	0	0	6
Marcel Pronovost	D	5	0	0	0	6

Goaltending

Player	MIN	GP	W	L	GA	GAA	SO
Glenn Hall	300	5	1	4	15	3.00	0
Team:	300	5	1	4	15	3.00	0

Note: GP = Games played; G = Goals; A = Assists; Pts = Points; +/- = Plus-minus PIM = Penalty minutes; PPG = Power-play goals; SHG = Short-handed goals; GWG = Game-winning goals;
MIN = Minutes played; W = Wins; L = Losses; T = Ties; GA = Goals against; GAA = Goals-against average; SO = Shutouts;

== See also ==
- 1956–57 NHL season
