= 1956–57 New York Rangers season =

NHL hockey team season

1956–57 New York Rangers
- League: 4th NHL
- 1956–57 record: 26–30–14
- Home record: 15–12–8
- Road record: 11–18–6
- Goals for: 184
- Goals against: 227

Team information
- General manager: Muzz Patrick
- Coach: Phil Watson
- Captain: Harry Howell
- Arena: Madison Square Garden

Team leaders
- Goals: Andy Bathgate (27)
- Assists: Andy Bathgate (50)
- Points: Andy Bathgate (77)
- Penalty minutes: Lou Fontinato (139)
- Wins: Gump Worsley (26)
- Goals against average: Johnny Bower (3.00)

The 1956–57 New York Rangers season was the franchise's 31st season.

== Regular season ==
=== Season standings ===
National Hockey League
		GP	W	L	T	GF	GA	DIFF	Pts
1	Detroit Red Wings	70	38	20	12	198	157	+41	88
2	Montreal Canadiens	70	35	23	12	210	155	+55	82
3	Boston Bruins	70	34	24	12	195	174	+21	80
4	New York Rangers	70	26	30	14	184	227	−43	66
5	Toronto Maple Leafs	70	21	34	15	174	192	−18	57
6	Chicago Black Hawks	70	16	39	15	169	225	−56	47

=== Record vs. opponents ===
1956–57 NHL Records
Team	BOS	CHI	DET	MTL	NYR	TOR
Boston	—	8–5–1	7–4–3	7–4–3	5–8–1	7–3–4
Chicago	5–8–1	—	2–10–2	3–8–3	1–7–6	5–6–3
Detroit	4–7–3	10–2–2	—	4–6–4	10–3–1	10–2–2
Montreal	4–7–3	8–3–3	6–4–4	—	8–5–1	9–4–1
New York	8–5–1	7–1–6	3–10–1	5–8–1	—	3–6–5
Toronto	3–7–4	6–5–3	2–10–2	4–9–1	6–3–5	—

== Schedule and results ==
1956–57 regular season
October: 4–3–1 (home: 3–0–1; road: 1–3–0)

Game	October	Opponent	Score	Record
1	12	@ Chicago Black Hawks	3–0	1–0–0
2	14	@ Detroit Red Wings	2–1	1–1–0
3	17	Boston Bruins	2–0	2–1–0
4	20	@ Montreal Canadiens	5–0	2–2–0
5	21	Chicago Black Hawks	4–1	3–2–0
6	24	Montreal Canadiens	3–2	4–2–0
7	28	Toronto Maple Leafs	1–1	4–2–1
8	31	@ Toronto Maple Leafs	7–2	4–3–1

November: 2–7–4 (home: 1–3–3; road: 1–4–1)

Game	November	Opponent	Score	Record
9	4	@ Boston Bruins	4–1	4–4–1
10	7	Boston Bruins	4–2	4–5–1
11	8	@ Montreal Canadiens	4–2	4–6–1
12	10	Detroit Red Wings	6–4	4–7–1
13	14	Montreal Canadiens	5–3	4–8–1
14	17	Boston Bruins	4–4	4–8–2
15	18	@ Chicago Black Hawks	2–2	4–8–3
16	21	Toronto Maple Leafs	3–3	4–8–4
17	22	@ Boston Bruins	4–3	5–8–4
18	24	@ Montreal Canadiens	6–1	5–9–4
19	25	Montreal Canadiens	1–1	5–9–5
20	28	Boston Bruins	2–1	6–9–5
21	29	@ Detroit Red Wings	4–1	6–10–5

December: 5–6–2 (home: 4–2–1; road: 1–4–1)

Game	December	Opponent	Score	Record
22	2	Toronto Maple Leafs	4–2	7–10–5
23	5	Chicago Black Hawks	2–2	7–10–6
24	8	@ Toronto Maple Leafs	0–0	7–10–7
25	9	Detroit Red Wings	4–2	8–10–7
26	13	@ Detroit Red Wings	2–1	8–11–7
27	15	@ Toronto Maple Leafs	2–1	8–12–7
28	16	Montreal Canadiens	4–2	9–12–7
29	21	@ Chicago Black Hawks	3–2	10–12–7
30	23	Toronto Maple Leafs	3–1	10–13–7
31	25	@ Detroit Red Wings	8–1	10–14–7
32	27	Chicago Black Hawks	3–2	11–14–7
33	29	@ Montreal Canadiens	6–3	11–15–7
34	31	Detroit Red Wings	1–0	11–16–7

January: 5–7–1 (home: 1–4–0; road: 4–3–1)

Game	January	Opponent	Score	Record
35	1	@ Boston Bruins	5–3	11–17–7
36	5	Chicago Black Hawks	4–1	12–17–7
37	6	Montreal Canadiens	3–2	12–18–7
38	9	Toronto Maple Leafs	4–3	12–19–7
39	11	@ Chicago Black Hawks	7–4	13–19–7
40	12	@ Detroit Red Wings	5–4	14–19–7
41	13	Detroit Red Wings	3–2	14–20–7
42	19	@ Montreal Canadiens	5–0	14–21–7
43	20	@ Detroit Red Wings	5–2	14–22–7
44	23	@ Toronto Maple Leafs	4–4	14–22–8
45	26	@ Boston Bruins	5–3	15–22–8
46	27	@ Chicago Black Hawks	3–2	16–22–8
47	30	Chicago Black Hawks	7–2	16–23–8

February: 6–4–3 (home: 5–1–1; road: 1–3–2)

Game	February	Opponent	Score	Record
48	2	Detroit Red Wings	5–4	16–24–8
49	3	@ Boston Bruins	4–1	16–25–8
50	6	Boston Bruins	3–2	17–25–8
51	7	@ Chicago Black Hawks	4–4	17–25–9
52	9	@ Toronto Maple Leafs	4–4	17–25–10
53	10	Montreal Canadiens	5–4	18–25–10
54	14	@ Detroit Red Wings	3–2	18–26–10
55	16	@ Montreal Canadiens	2–1	19–26–10
56	17	Toronto Maple Leafs	3–2	20–26–10
57	20	Boston Bruins	5–2	21–26–10
58	23	@ Montreal Canadiens	4–1	21–27–10
59	24	Montreal Canadiens	4–3	22–27–10
60	27	Chicago Black Hawks	6–6	22–27–11

March: 4–3–3 (home: 1–2–2; road: 3–1–1)

Game	March	Opponent	Score	Record
61	2	@ Boston Bruins	3–2	23–27–11
62	3	Detroit Red Wings	1–1	23–27–12
63	7	@ Chicago Black Hawks	2–2	23–27–13
64	9	@ Toronto Maple Leafs	2–1	24–27–13
65	10	Detroit Red Wings	4–1	25–27–13
66	13	Boston Bruins	2–1	25–28–13
67	16	@ Toronto Maple Leafs	14–1	25–29–13
68	17	Toronto Maple Leafs	5–3	25–30–13
69	23	@ Boston Bruins	4–2	26–30–13
70	24	Chicago Black Hawks	4–4	26–30–14

Legend: Win (2 points) Loss (0 points) Tie (1 point)

== Playoffs ==
1957 Stanley Cup playoffs
Semifinals vs. (2) Montreal Canadiens – Montreal wins 4–1

Game	Date	Visitor	Score	Home	OT	Series
1	March 26	Montreal Canadiens	4–1	New York Rangers		Montreal leads series 1–0
2	March 28	Montreal Canadiens	3–4	New York Rangers	OT	Series tied 1–1
3	March 30	New York Rangers	3–8	Montreal Canadiens		Montreal leads series 2–1
4	April 2	New York Rangers	1–3	Montreal Canadiens		Montreal leads series 3–1
5	April 4	New York Rangers	3–4	Montreal Canadiens	OT	Montreal wins series 4–1

Legend: Win Loss

== Player statistics ==
Skaters

Regular season
Player	GP	G	A	Pts	PIM
Andy Bathgate	70	27	50	77	60
Andy Hebenton	70	21	23	44	10
Dean Prentice	68	19	23	42	38
Bill Gadsby	70	4	37	41	72
Dave Creighton	70	18	21	39	42
Danny Lewicki	70	18	20	38	47
Larry Popein	67	11	19	30	20
Camille Henry	36	14	15	29	2
George Sullivan	42	6	17	23	36
Ron Murphy	33	7	12	19	14
Gerry Foley	69	7	9	16	48
Jean-Guy Gendron	70	9	6	15	40
Parker MacDonald	45	7	8	15	24
Lou Fontinato	70	3	12	15	139
Harry Howell	65	2	10	12	70
Larry Cahan	61	5	4	9	65
Jack Evans	70	3	6	9	110
Bruce Cline	30	2	3	5	10
Bronco Horvath^{‡}	7	1	2	3	4

Playoffs
Player	GP	G	A	Pts	PIM
Camille Henry	5	2	3	5	0
Dave Creighton	5	2	2	4	2
George Sullivan	5	1	2	3	4
Larry Popein	5	0	3	3	0
Bill Gadsby	5	1	2	3	2
Parker MacDonald	1	1	1	2	0
Dean Prentice	5	0	2	2	4
Andy Hebenton	5	2	0	2	2
Andy Bathgate	5	2	0	2	7
Jack Evans	5	0	1	1	4
Harry Howell	5	1	0	1	6
Jean-Guy Gendron	5	0	1	1	6
Danny Lewicki	5	0	1	1	2
Larry Cahan	3	0	0	0	2
Lou Fontinato	5	0	0	0	7
Gerry Foley	3	0	0	0	0
Ron Murphy	5	0	0	0	0

Goaltenders

Regular season
Player	GP	TOI	W	L	T	GA	GAA	SA	SV%	SO
Lorne Worsley	68	4080	26	28	14	217	3.24	2341	.907	3
Johnny Bower	2	120	0	2	0	6	3.00	47	.872	0

Playoffs
Player	GP	TOI	W	L	GA	GAA	SO
Lorne Worsley	5	316	1	4	21	3.99	0

^{†}Denotes player spent time with another team before joining Rangers. Stats reflect time with Rangers only.
^{‡}Traded mid-season. Stats reflect time with Rangers only.

Note:

Pos = Position;GP = Games played; G = Goals; A = Assists; Pts = Points; PIM = Penalty minutes; +/- = Plus/minus; PPG = Power-play goals; SHG = Short-handed goals; GWG = Game-winning goals
Pos = Position;GP = Games played; Min, TOI = Minutes played; W = Wins; L = Losses; T,T/OT = Ties; OTL = Overtime losses; GA = Goals-against; GAA = Goals-against average; SO = Shutouts; SA = Shots against; SV = Shots saved;SV% = Save percentage;
