= 1956–57 Montreal Canadiens season =

NHL hockey team season(won Stanley Cup)

1956–57 Montreal Canadiens
- Stanley Cup champions
- League: 2nd NHL
- 1956–57 record: 35–23–12
- Home record: 23–6–6
- Road record: 12–17–6
- Goals for: 210
- Goals against: 155

Team information
- General manager: Frank J. Selke
- Coach: Toe Blake
- Captain: Maurice Richard
- Alternate captains: Floyd Curry; Doug Harvey; Tom Johnson
- Arena: Montreal Forum

Team leaders
- Goals: Jean Beliveau and Maurice Richard (33)
- Assists: Jean Beliveau (51)
- Points: Jean Beliveau (84)
- Penalty minutes: Jean Beliveau (105)
- Wins: Jacques Plante (31)
- Goals against average: Jacques Plante (2.00)

The 1956–57 Montreal Canadiens season was the club's 48th season of play. The Canadiens would place second in the league to qualify for the playoffs. The Canadiens defeated the Boston Bruins to win the Stanley Cup for the ninth time in team history and for the second year in a row.

== Regular season ==
=== Final standings ===
National Hockey League
		GP	W	L	T	GF	GA	DIFF	Pts
1	Detroit Red Wings	70	38	20	12	198	157	+41	88
2	Montreal Canadiens	70	35	23	12	210	155	+55	82
3	Boston Bruins	70	34	24	12	195	174	+21	80
4	New York Rangers	70	26	30	14	184	227	−43	66
5	Toronto Maple Leafs	70	21	34	15	174	192	−18	57
6	Chicago Black Hawks	70	16	39	15	169	225	−56	47

=== Record vs. opponents ===
1956–57 NHL Records
Team	BOS	CHI	DET	MTL	NYR	TOR
Boston	—	8–5–1	7–4–3	7–4–3	5–8–1	7–3–4
Chicago	5–8–1	—	2–10–2	3–8–3	1–7–6	5–6–3
Detroit	4–7–3	10–2–2	—	4–6–4	10–3–1	10–2–2
Montreal	4–7–3	8–3–3	6–4–4	—	8–5–1	9–4–1
New York	8–5–1	7–1–6	3–10–1	5–8–1	—	3–6–5
Toronto	3–7–4	6–5–3	2–10–2	4–9–1	6–3–5	—

== Schedule and results ==
1956–57 regular season
October

Game	Result	Date	Score	Opponent	Record
1	W	October 13, 1956	3–0	Boston Bruins (1956–57)	1–0–0
2	L	October 14, 1956	1–3	@ Boston Bruins (1956–57)	1–1–0
3	T	October 18, 1956	1–1	Chicago Black Hawks (1956–57)	1–1–1
4	W	October 20, 1956	5–0	New York Rangers (1956–57)	2–1–1
5	L	October 24, 1956	2–3	@ New York Rangers (1956–57)	2–2–1
6	L	October 25, 1956	2–3	Toronto Maple Leafs (1956–57)	2–3–1
7	L	October 27, 1956	0–1	Boston Bruins (1956–57)	2–4–1
8	L	October 28, 1956	1–4	@ Detroit Red Wings (1956–57)	2–5–1

November

Game	Result	Date	Score	Opponent	Record
9	W	November 1, 1956	4–3	Detroit Red Wings (1956–57)	3–5–1
10	W	November 3, 1956	6–0	Chicago Black Hawks (1956–57)	4–5–1
11	W	November 4, 1956	1–0	@ Chicago Black Hawks (1956–57)	5–5–1
12	W	November 7, 1956	4–3	@ Toronto Maple Leafs (1956–57)	6–5–1
13	W	November 8, 1956	4–2	New York Rangers (1956–57)	7–5–1
14	L	November 10, 1956	1–3	Boston Bruins (1956–57)	7–6–1
15	L	November 11, 1956	2–3	@ Boston Bruins (1956–57)	7–7–1
16	W	November 14, 1956	5–3	@ New York Rangers (1956–57)	8–7–1
17	W	November 17, 1956	6–2	Detroit Red Wings (1956–57)	9–7–1
18	L	November 18, 1956	3–8	@ Detroit Red Wings (1956–57)	9–8–1
19	L	November 22, 1956	3–5	@ Chicago Black Hawks (1956–57)	9–9–1
20	W	November 24, 1956	6–1	New York Rangers (1956–57)	10–9–1
21	T	November 25, 1956	1–1	@ New York Rangers (1956–57)	10–9–2
22	W	November 29, 1956	4–2	Toronto Maple Leafs (1956–57)	11–9–2

December

Game	Result	Date	Score	Opponent	Record
23	W	December 1, 1956	7–0	Chicago Black Hawks (1956–57)	12–9–2
24	L	December 2, 1956	0–1	@ Detroit Red Wings (1956–57)	12–10–2
25	W	December 5, 1956	3–1	@ Toronto Maple Leafs (1956–57)	13–10–2
26	W	December 7, 1956	3–1	@ Chicago Black Hawks (1956–57)	14–10–2
27	T	December 9, 1956	1–1	@ Boston Bruins (1956–57)	14–10–3
28	W	December 13, 1956	6–2	Toronto Maple Leafs (1956–57)	15–10–3
29	W	December 15, 1956	6–4	Boston Bruins (1956–57)	16–10–3
30	L	December 16, 1956	2–4	@ New York Rangers (1956–57)	16–11–3
31	W	December 20, 1956	4–2	Toronto Maple Leafs (1956–57)	17–11–3
32	T	December 22, 1956	1–1	Detroit Red Wings (1956–57)	17–11–4
33	T	December 23, 1956	3–3	@ Detroit Red Wings (1956–57)	17–11–5
34	L	December 26, 1956	0–1	@ Toronto Maple Leafs (1956–57)	17–12–5
35	W	December 29, 1956	6–3	New York Rangers (1956–57)	18–12–5

January

Game	Result	Date	Score	Opponent	Record
36	W	January 1, 1957	6–2	@ Chicago Black Hawks (1956–57)	19–12–5
37	T	January 3, 1957	3–3	Chicago Black Hawks (1956–57)	19–12–6
38	W	January 5, 1957	1–0	Detroit Red Wings (1956–57)	20–12–6
39	W	January 6, 1957	3–2	@ New York Rangers (1956–57)	21–12–6
40	W	January 10, 1957	2–1	Toronto Maple Leafs (1956–57)	22–12–6
41	W	January 12, 1957	4–1	Boston Bruins (1956–57)	23–12–6
42	W	January 13, 1957	3–1	@ Boston Bruins (1956–57)	24–12–6
43	W	January 16, 1957	3–2	@ Toronto Maple Leafs (1956–57)	25–12–6
44	W	January 19, 1957	5–0	New York Rangers (1956–57)	26–12–6
45	L	January 20, 1957	2–4	@ Chicago Black Hawks (1956–57)	26–13–6
46	T	January 26, 1957	4–4	Chicago Black Hawks (1956–57)	26–13–7
47	L	January 27, 1957	2–5	@ Boston Bruins (1956–57)	26–14–7
48	W	January 31, 1957	5–3	Detroit Red Wings (1956–57)	27–14–7

February

Game	Result	Date	Score	Opponent	Record
49	L	February 2, 1957	1–2	Boston Bruins (1956–57)	27–15–7
50	T	February 3, 1957	3–3	@ Detroit Red Wings (1956–57)	27–15–8
51	T	February 6, 1957	1–1	@ Toronto Maple Leafs (1956–57)	27–15–9
52	T	February 9, 1957	2–2	@ Boston Bruins (1956–57)	27–15–10
53	L	February 10, 1957	4–5	@ New York Rangers (1956–57)	27–16–10
54	L	February 14, 1957	1–2	Toronto Maple Leafs (1956–57)	27–17–10
55	L	February 16, 1957	1–2	New York Rangers (1956–57)	27–18–10
56	W	February 17, 1957	3–2	@ Chicago Black Hawks (1956–57)	28–18–10
57	T	February 21, 1957	3–3	Detroit Red Wings (1956–57)	28–18–11
58	W	February 23, 1957	4–1	New York Rangers (1956–57)	29–18–11
59	L	February 24, 1957	3–4	@ New York Rangers (1956–57)	29–19–11
60	W	February 28, 1957	3–0	@ Detroit Red Wings (1956–57)	30–19–11

March

Game	Result	Date	Score	Opponent	Record
61	W	March 2, 1957	5–1	Detroit Red Wings (1956–57)	31–19–11
62	L	March 3, 1957	2–5	@ Boston Bruins (1956–57)	31–20–11
63	L	March 6, 1957	1–3	@ Toronto Maple Leafs (1956–57)	31–21–11
64	W	March 9, 1957	6–4	Chicago Black Hawks (1956–57)	32–21–11
65	L	March 10, 1957	1–3	@ Chicago Black Hawks (1956–57)	32–22–11
66	W	March 14, 1957	8–4	Toronto Maple Leafs (1956–57)	33–22–11
67	T	March 16, 1957	2–2	Boston Bruins (1956–57)	33–22–12
68	L	March 17, 1957	1–2	@ Detroit Red Wings (1956–57)	33–23–12
69	W	March 20, 1957	2–1	@ Toronto Maple Leafs (1956–57)	34–23–12
70	W	March 23, 1957	3–0	Chicago Black Hawks (1956–57)	35–23–12

Legend: Win (2 points) Loss (0 points) Tie (1 point)

== Playoffs ==
The Canadiens qualified for the playoffs in second place. The Canadien then faced off against the New York Rangers, winning the best-of-seven series 4–1 to advance to the final against Boston.

=== Stanley Cup Finals ===
Boston Bruins vs. Montreal Canadiens

Date	Away	Score	Home	Score	Notes
April 6	Boston	1	Montreal	5	
April 9	Boston	0	Montreal	1	
April 11	Montreal	4	Boston	2	
April 14	Montreal	0	Boston	2	
April 16	Boston	1	Montreal	5	

Montreal wins best-of-seven series 4 games to 1

== Player statistics ==
=== Regular season ===
Scoring

Player	Pos	GP	G	A	Pts	PIM
Jean Beliveau	C	69	33	51	84	105
Maurice Richard	RW	63	33	29	62	74
Dickie Moore	LW	70	29	29	58	56
Henri Richard	C	63	18	36	54	71
Doug Harvey	D	70	6	44	50	92
Bert Olmstead	LW	64	15	33	48	74
Bernie Geoffrion	RW	41	19	21	40	18
Claude Provost	RW	67	16	14	30	24
Andre Pronovost	LW	64	10	11	21	58
Donnie Marshall	LW	70	12	8	20	6
Floyd Curry	RW	70	7	9	16	20
Tom Johnson	D	70	4	11	15	59
Jack LeClair	C	47	3	10	13	14
Jean-Guy Talbot	D	59	0	13	13	70
Dollard St. Laurent	D	64	1	11	12	49
Phil Goyette	C	14	3	4	7	0
Bob Turner	D	58	1	4	5	48
Allan Johnson	RW/C	2	0	1	1	2
Gene Achtymichuk	C	3	0	0	0	0
Ralph Backstrom	C	3	0	0	0	0
Murray Balfour	RW	2	0	0	0	2
Glen Cressman	C	4	0	0	0	2
Bronco Horvath	C	1	0	0	0	0
Bud MacPherson	D	10	0	0	0	4
Gerry McNeil	G	9	0	0	0	2
Jacques Plante	G	61	0	0	0	16
Guy Rousseau	LW	2	0	0	0	0
Stan Smrke	LW	4	0	0	0	0
Jerry Wilson	C	3	0	0	0	2

Goaltending

Player	MIN	GP	W	L	T	GA	GAA	SO
Jacques Plante	3660	61	31	18	12	122	2.00	9
Gerry McNeil	540	9	4	5	0	31	3.44	0
Team:	4200	70	35	23	12	153	2.19	9

=== Playoffs ===
Scoring

Player	Pos	GP	G	A	Pts	PIM
Bernie Geoffrion	RW	10	11	7	18	2
Jean Beliveau	C	10	6	6	12	15
Maurice Richard	RW	10	8	3	11	8
Dickie Moore	LW	10	3	7	10	4
Bert Olmstead	LW	10	0	9	9	13
Henri Richard	C	10	2	6	8	10
Doug Harvey	D	10	0	7	7	10
Floyd Curry	RW	10	3	2	5	2
Donnie Marshall	LW	10	1	3	4	2
Phil Goyette	C	10	2	1	3	4
Tom Johnson	D	10	0	2	2	13
Jean-Guy Talbot	D	10	0	2	2	10
Andre Pronovost	LW	8	1	0	1	4
Connie Broden	C	6	0	1	1	0
Claude Provost	RW	10	0	1	1	8
Dollard St. Laurent	D	7	0	1	1	13
Bob Turner	D	6	0	1	1	0
Jacques Plante	G	10	0	0	0	4

Goaltending

Player	MIN	GP	W	L	GA	GAA	SO
Jacques Plante	616	10	8	2	17	1.66	1
Team:	616	10	8	2	17	1.66	1

Note:

Pos = Position;GP = Games played; G = Goals; A = Assists; Pts = Points; PIM = Penalty minutes; +/- = Plus/minus; PPG = Power-play goals; SHG = Short-handed goals; GWG = Game-winning goals
Pos = Position;GP = Games played; Min, TOI = Minutes played; W = Wins; L = Losses; T,T/OT = Ties; OTL = Overtime losses; GA = Goals-against; GAA = Goals-against average; SO = Shutouts; SA = Shots against; SV = Shots saved;SV% = Save percentage;

== Awards and records ==
- James Norris Memorial Trophy: || Doug Harvey
- Vezina Trophy: || Jacques Plante

== See also ==
- 1956–57 NHL season
- List of Stanley Cup champions
