= 1956–57 Toronto Maple Leafs season =

NHL hockey team season

1956–57 Toronto Maple Leafs
- League: 5th NHL
- 1956–57 record: 21–34–15
- Home record: 12–16–7
- Road record: 9–18–8
- Goals for: 174
- Goals against: 192

Team information
- General manager: Conn Smythe and Hap Day
- Coach: Howie Meeker
- Captain: Jimmy Thomson; Ted Kennedy
- Arena: Maple Leaf Gardens

Team leaders
- Goals: Dick Duff (26)
- Assists: George Armstrong (26)
- Points: George Armstrong (44)
- Penalty minutes: Gerry James (90)
- Wins: Ed Chadwick (21)
- Goals against average: Ed Chadwick (2.66)

The 1956–57 Toronto Maple Leafs season was Toronto's 40th season in the National Hockey League (NHL).

== Regular season ==
=== Final standings ===
National Hockey League
| | | GP | W | L | T | GF | GA | DIFF | Pts |
|---|---|---|---|---|---|---|---|---|---|
| 1 | Detroit Red Wings | 70 | 38 | 20 | 12 | 198 | 157 | +41 | 88 |
| 2 | Montreal Canadiens | 70 | 35 | 23 | 12 | 210 | 155 | +55 | 82 |
| 3 | Boston Bruins | 70 | 34 | 24 | 12 | 195 | 174 | +21 | 80 |
| 4 | New York Rangers | 70 | 26 | 30 | 14 | 184 | 227 | −43 | 66 |
| 5 | Toronto Maple Leafs | 70 | 21 | 34 | 15 | 174 | 192 | −18 | 57 |
| 6 | Chicago Black Hawks | 70 | 16 | 39 | 15 | 169 | 225 | −56 | 47 |

=== Record vs. opponents ===
1956–57 NHL Records
| Team | BOS | CHI | DET | MTL | NYR | TOR |
|---|---|---|---|---|---|---|
| Boston | — | 8–5–1 | 7–4–3 | 7–4–3 | 5–8–1 | 7–3–4 |
| Chicago | 5–8–1 | — | 2–10–2 | 3–8–3 | 1–7–6 | 5–6–3 |
| Detroit | 4–7–3 | 10–2–2 | — | 4–6–4 | 10–3–1 | 10–2–2 |
| Montreal | 4–7–3 | 8–3–3 | 6–4–4 | — | 8–5–1 | 9–4–1 |
| New York | 8–5–1 | 7–1–6 | 3–10–1 | 5–8–1 | — | 3–6–5 |
| Toronto | 3–7–4 | 6–5–3 | 2–10–2 | 4–9–1 | 6–3–5 | — |

== Schedule and results ==
1956–57 regular season
October

| Game | Result | Date | Score | Opponent | Record |
|---|---|---|---|---|---|
| 1 | T | October 11 | 4–4 | @ Boston Bruins (1956–57) | 0–0–1 |
| 2 | L | October 13 | 1–4 | Detroit Red Wings (1956–57) | 0–1–1 |
| 3 | W | October 14 | 1–0 | @ Chicago Black Hawks (1956–57) | 1–1–1 |
| 4 | T | October 18 | 3–3 | @ Detroit Red Wings (1956–57) | 1–1–2 |
| 5 | T | October 20 | 2–2 | Boston Bruins (1956–57) | 1–1–3 |
| 6 | W | October 25 | 3–2 | @ Montreal Canadiens (1956–57) | 2–1–3 |
| 7 | W | October 27 | 5–2 | Chicago Black Hawks (1956–57) | 3–1–3 |
| 8 | T | October 28 | 1–1 | @ New York Rangers (1956–57) | 3–1–4 |
| 9 | W | October 31 | 7–2 | New York Rangers (1956–57) | 4–1–4 |

November

| Game | Result | Date | Score | Opponent | Record |
|---|---|---|---|---|---|
| 10 | L | November 3 | 1–2 | Detroit Red Wings (1956–57) | 4–2–4 |
| 11 | L | November 7 | 3–4 | Montreal Canadiens (1956–57) | 4–3–4 |
| 12 | L | November 8 | 2–5 | @ Chicago Black Hawks (1956–57) | 4–4–4 |
| 13 | W | November 10 | 4–1 | Chicago Black Hawks (1956–57) | 5–4–4 |
| 14 | L | November 15 | 2–4 | @ Detroit Red Wings (1956–57) | 5–5–4 |
| 15 | L | November 17 | 3–6 | Chicago Black Hawks (1956–57) | 5–6–4 |
| 16 | L | November 18 | 3–4 | @ Boston Bruins (1956–57) | 5–7–4 |
| 17 | T | November 21 | 3–3 | @ New York Rangers (1956–57) | 5–7–5 |
| 18 | T | November 22 | 2–2 | @ Detroit Red Wings (1956–57) | 5–7–6 |
| 19 | L | November 24 | 2–3 | Boston Bruins (1956–57) | 5–8–6 |
| 20 | L | November 25 | 1–3 | @ Boston Bruins (1956–57) | 5–9–6 |
| 21 | L | November 29 | 2–4 | @ Montreal Canadiens (1956–57) | 5–10–6 |

December

| Game | Result | Date | Score | Opponent | Record |
|---|---|---|---|---|---|
| 22 | W | December 1 | 4–0 | Detroit Red Wings (1956–57) | 6–10–6 |
| 23 | L | December 2 | 2–4 | @ New York Rangers (1956–57) | 6–11–6 |
| 24 | L | December 5 | 1–3 | Montreal Canadiens (1956–57) | 6–12–6 |
| 25 | T | December 8 | 0–0 | New York Rangers (1956–57) | 6–12–7 |
| 26 | W | December 9 | 2–1 | @ Chicago Black Hawks (1956–57) | 7–12–7 |
| 27 | L | December 13 | 2–6 | @ Montreal Canadiens (1956–57) | 7–13–7 |
| 28 | W | December 15 | 2–1 | New York Rangers (1956–57) | 8–13–7 |
| 29 | L | December 16 | 2–4 | @ Boston Bruins (1956–57) | 8–14–7 |
| 30 | L | December 20 | 2–4 | @ Montreal Canadiens (1956–57) | 8–15–7 |
| 31 | L | December 22 | 2–3 | Boston Bruins (1956–57) | 8–16–7 |
| 32 | W | December 23 | 3–1 | @ New York Rangers (1956–57) | 9–16–7 |
| 33 | W | December 26 | 1–0 | Montreal Canadiens (1956–57) | 10–16–7 |
| 34 | W | December 29 | 6–3 | Chicago Black Hawks (1956–57) | 11–16–7 |
| 35 | L | December 30 | 0–2 | @ Chicago Black Hawks (1956–57) | 11–17–7 |

January

| Game | Result | Date | Score | Opponent | Record |
|---|---|---|---|---|---|
| 36 | L | January 2 | 0–2 | Detroit Red Wings (1956–57) | 11–18–7 |
| 37 | W | January 5 | 3–2 | Boston Bruins (1956–57) | 12–18–7 |
| 38 | L | January 6 | 1–2 | @ Detroit Red Wings (1956–57) | 12–19–7 |
| 39 | W | January 9 | 4–3 | @ New York Rangers (1956–57) | 13–19–7 |
| 40 | L | January 10 | 1–2 | @ Montreal Canadiens (1956–57) | 13–20–7 |
| 41 | W | January 12 | 4–3 | Chicago Black Hawks (1956–57) | 14–20–7 |
| 42 | T | January 13 | 1–1 | @ Chicago Black Hawks (1956–57) | 14–20–8 |
| 43 | L | January 16 | 2–3 | Montreal Canadiens (1956–57) | 14–21–8 |
| 44 | W | January 19 | 4–1 | Boston Bruins (1956–57) | 15–21–8 |
| 45 | W | January 20 | 3–2 | @ Boston Bruins (1956–57) | 16–21–8 |
| 46 | T | January 23 | 4–4 | New York Rangers (1956–57) | 16–21–9 |
| 47 | L | January 26 | 1–4 | Detroit Red Wings (1956–57) | 16–22–9 |
| 48 | L | January 27 | 1–3 | @ Detroit Red Wings (1956–57) | 16–23–9 |

February

| Game | Result | Date | Score | Opponent | Record |
|---|---|---|---|---|---|
| 49 | T | February 2 | 3–3 | Chicago Black Hawks (1956–57) | 16–23–10 |
| 50 | L | February 3 | 3–6 | @ Chicago Black Hawks (1956–57) | 16–24–10 |
| 51 | T | February 6 | 1–1 | Montreal Canadiens (1956–57) | 16–24–11 |
| 52 | T | February 9 | 4–4 | New York Rangers (1956–57) | 16–24–12 |
| 53 | L | February 10 | 1–5 | @ Boston Bruins (1956–57) | 16–25–12 |
| 54 | T | February 13 | 2–2 | Boston Bruins (1956–57) | 16–25–13 |
| 55 | W | February 14 | 2–1 | @ Montreal Canadiens (1956–57) | 17–25–13 |
| 56 | L | February 16 | 1–3 | Detroit Red Wings (1956–57) | 17–26–13 |
| 57 | L | February 17 | 2–3 | @ New York Rangers (1956–57) | 17–27–13 |
| 58 | L | February 23 | 2–5 | Boston Bruins (1956–57) | 17–28–13 |
| 59 | W | February 24 | 2–1 | @ Detroit Red Wings (1956–57) | 18–28–13 |

March

| Game | Result | Date | Score | Opponent | Record |
|---|---|---|---|---|---|
| 60 | L | March 2 | 3–4 | Chicago Black Hawks (1956–57) | 18–29–13 |
| 61 | T | March 3 | 0–0 | @ Chicago Black Hawks (1956–57) | 18–29–14 |
| 62 | W | March 6 | 3–1 | Montreal Canadiens (1956–57) | 19–29–14 |
| 63 | L | March 9 | 1–2 | New York Rangers (1956–57) | 19–30–14 |
| 64 | T | March 10 | 3–3 | @ Boston Bruins (1956–57) | 19–30–15 |
| 65 | L | March 14 | 4–8 | @ Montreal Canadiens (1956–57) | 19–31–15 |
| 66 | W | March 16 | 14–1 | New York Rangers (1956–57) | 20–31–15 |
| 67 | W | March 17 | 5–3 | @ New York Rangers (1956–57) | 21–31–15 |
| 68 | L | March 20 | 1–2 | Montreal Canadiens (1956–57) | 21–32–15 |
| 69 | L | March 23 | 3–5 | Detroit Red Wings (1956–57) | 21–33–15 |
| 70 | L | March 24 | 1–4 | @ Detroit Red Wings (1956–57) | 21–34–15 |

Legend: Win (2 points) Loss (0 points) Tie (1 point)

== Player statistics ==
=== Regular season ===
Scoring

| Player | GP | G | A | Pts | PIM |
|---|---|---|---|---|---|
| George Armstrong | 54 | 18 | 26 | 44 | 37 |
| Sid Smith | 70 | 17 | 24 | 41 | 4 |
| Dick Duff | 70 | 26 | 14 | 40 | 50 |
| Rudy Migay | 66 | 15 | 20 | 35 | 51 |
| Ron Stewart | 65 | 15 | 20 | 35 | 28 |
| Tod Sloan | 52 | 14 | 21 | 35 | 33 |
| Tim Horton | 66 | 6 | 19 | 25 | 72 |
| Bob Pulford | 65 | 11 | 11 | 22 | 32 |
| Ted Kennedy | 30 | 6 | 16 | 22 | 35 |
| Brian Cullen | 46 | 8 | 12 | 20 | 27 |
| Marc Reaume | 63 | 6 | 14 | 20 | 81 |
| Jim Morrison | 63 | 3 | 17 | 20 | 44 |
| Barry Cullen | 51 | 6 | 10 | 16 | 30 |
| Gerry James | 53 | 4 | 12 | 16 | 90 |
| Al MacNeil | 53 | 4 | 8 | 12 | 84 |
| Jimmy Thomson | 62 | 0 | 12 | 12 | 50 |
| Billy Harris | 23 | 4 | 6 | 10 | 6 |
| Gary Aldcorn | 22 | 5 | 1 | 6 | 4 |
| Bobby Baun | 20 | 0 | 5 | 5 | 37 |
| Mike Nykoluk | 32 | 3 | 1 | 4 | 20 |
| Ron Hurst | 14 | 2 | 2 | 4 | 8 |
| Frank Mahovlich | 3 | 1 | 0 | 1 | 2 |
| Ken Girard | 3 | 0 | 1 | 1 | 2 |
| Hugh Bolton | 6 | 0 | 0 | 0 | 2 |
| Ed Chadwick | 70 | 0 | 0 | 0 | 0 |

Goaltending

| Player | MIN | GP | W | L | T | GA | GAA | SA | SV | SV% | SO |
|---|---|---|---|---|---|---|---|---|---|---|---|
| Ed Chadwick | 4200 | 70 | 21 | 34 | 15 | 186 | 2.66 | | | | 5 |
| Team: | 4200 | 70 | 21 | 34 | 15 | 186 | 2.66 | | | | 5 |

== See also ==
- 1956–57 NHL season
