= Gerry Foley =

American-born Canadian ice hockey player (1932–2021)

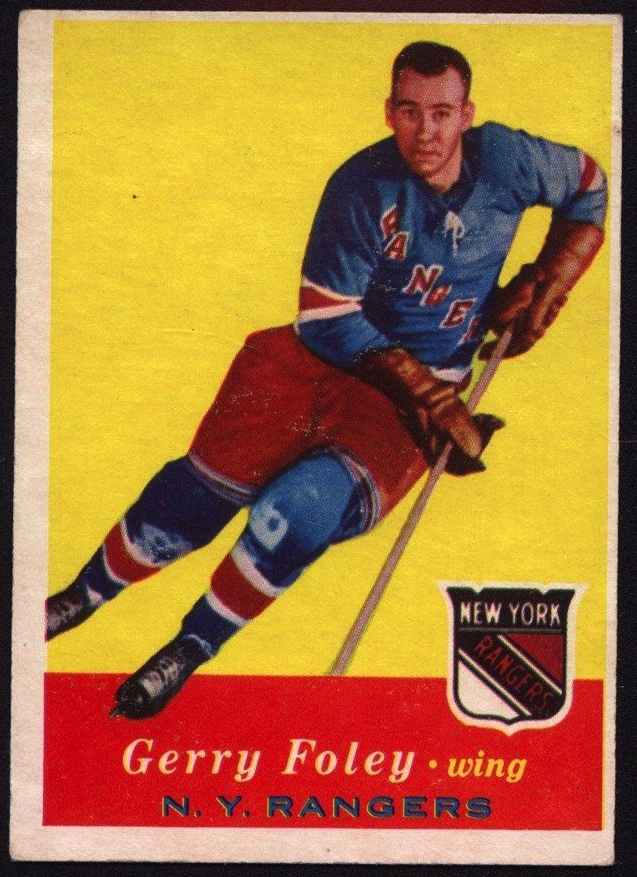
- Born: September 22, 1932 Ware, Massachusetts, U.S.
- Died: December 8, 2021 (aged 89) Sudbury, Ontario, Canada
- Height: 5 ft 11 in (180 cm)
- Weight: 165 lb (75 kg; 11 st 11 lb)
- Position: Right wing
- Caught: Right
- Played for: Toronto Maple Leafs; New York Rangers; Los Angeles Kings
- Playing career: 1952–1969

Gerald James Foley (September 22, 1932 – December 8, 2021) was an American-born Canadian professional ice hockey right winger who played 142 games in the National Hockey League for the New York Rangers, Los Angeles Kings, and Toronto Maple Leafs between 1955 and 1968. The rest of his career, which lasted from 1952 to 1969, was spent in various minor leagues.

He was born in Ware, Massachusetts and raised in Garson, Ontario. While playing with the Seattle Bombers of the Western Hockey League (WHL) in 1952-53, Foley was named the WHL's rookie of the year.

Foley died on December 8, 2021, at the age of 89.

== Career statistics ==
=== Regular season and playoffs ===
| | | | Regular season | | | | | Playoffs |
| Season | Team | League | GP | G | A | Pts | PIM | GP | G | A | Pts | PIM |
|---|---|---|---|---|---|---|---|---|---|---|---|---|
| 1950–51 | North Bay Trappers | NOHA | — | — | — | — | — | — | — | — | — | — |
| 1951–52 | St. Catharines Teepees | OHA | 53 | 13 | 23 | 36 | 41 | 14 | 5 | 6 | 11 | 20 |
| 1952–53 | Seattle Bombers | WHL | 70 | 29 | 30 | 59 | 46 | 5 | 1 | 2 | 3 | 0 |
| 1953–54 | Ottawa Senators | QSHL | 43 | 9 | 6 | 15 | 57 | 22 | 7 | 4 | 11 | 14 |
| 1953–54 | Pittsburgh Hornets | AHL | 16 | 1 | 3 | 4 | 13 | — | — | — | — | — |
| 1954–55 | Toronto Maple Leafs | NHL | 4 | 0 | 0 | 0 | 8 | — | — | — | — | — |
| 1954–55 | Pittsburgh Hornets | AHL | 61 | 16 | 21 | 37 | 61 | 10 | 5 | 3 | 8 | 8 |
| 1955–56 | Pittsburgh Hornets | AHL | 59 | 29 | 29 | 58 | 109 | 3 | 2 | 0 | 2 | 2 |
| 1956–57 | New York Rangers | NHL | 69 | 7 | 9 | 16 | 48 | 3 | 0 | 0 | 0 | 0 |
| 1957–58 | New York Rangers | NHL | 68 | 2 | 5 | 7 | 43 | 6 | 0 | 1 | 1 | 2 |
| 1958–59 | Buffalo Bisons | AHL | 68 | 9 | 22 | 31 | 36 | 11 | 5 | 2 | 7 | 15 |
| 1959–60 | Springfield Indians | AHL | 31 | 5 | 13 | 18 | 7 | 10 | 1 | 6 | 7 | 4 |
| 1960–61 | Springfield Indians | AHL | 53 | 15 | 29 | 44 | 27 | 3 | 1 | 4 | 5 | 0 |
| 1961–62 | Sudbury Wolves | EPHL | 58 | 18 | 34 | 52 | 36 | 5 | 2 | 5 | 7 | 0 |
| 1962–63 | Springfield Indians | AHL | 51 | 11 | 13 | 24 | 18 | — | — | — | — | — |
| 1963–64 | Springfield Indians | AHL | 62 | 8 | 8 | 26 | 26 | — | — | — | — | — |
| 1964–65 | Springfield Indians | AHL | 71 | 21 | 34 | 55 | 36 | — | — | — | — | — |
| 1965–66 | Springfield Indians | AHL | 49 | 12 | 14 | 26 | 26 | 6 | 3 | 1 | 4 | 6 |
| 1966–67 | Springfield Indians | AHL | 66 | 26 | 35 | 61 | 31 | — | — | — | — | — |
| 1967–68 | Springfield Kings | AHL | 71 | 25 | 33 | 58 | 39 | 4 | 1 | 0 | 1 | 0 |
| 1968–69 | Los Angeles Kings | NHL | 1 | 0 | 0 | 0 | 0 | — | — | — | — | — |
| 1968–69 | Denver Spurs | WHL | 51 | 10 | 24 | 34 | 16 | — | — | — | — | — |
| AHL totals | | | 658 | 178 | 264 | 442 | 429 | 47 | 18 | 16 | 34 | 35 |
| NHL totals | | | 142 | 9 | 14 | 23 | 99 | 9 | 0 | 1 | 1 | 2 |
