= Dale Anderson (ice hockey) =

Canadian ice hockey player

- Born: March 5, 1932; Regina, Saskatchewan, Canada
- Died: December 6, 2015 (aged 83); Saskatoon, Saskatchewan, Canada
- Height: 6 ft 3 in (191 cm)
- Weight: 190 lb (86 kg; 13 st 8 lb)
- Position: Defenceman
- Shot: Left
- Played for: Detroit Red Wings
- Playing career: 1952–1968

Dale Norman Anderson (March 5, 1932 – December 6, 2015) was a Canadian ice hockey defenceman who played 13 games for the Detroit Red Wings during the 1956–57 season.

== Career ==
Anderson played 13 games for the Detroit Red Wings of the National Hockey League in the 1956–57 season. The rest of his career, which lasted from 1952 to 1968, was spent in the minor leagues.

Anderson also played professional hockey with the Vancouver Canucks, Saskatoon Quakers, and Portland Buckaroos of the Western Hockey League, the Montreal Royals of the Quebec Hockey League as well as the Springfield Indians of the American Hockey League.

Anderson worked for Seagram in Saskatoon after retiring from hockey.

== Personal life ==
Anderson died on December 6, 2015, at the age of 83 at St. Paul's Hospital in Saskatoon, Saskatchewan.

== Career statistics ==
=== Regular season and playoffs ===
			Regular season					Playoffs
Season	Team	League	GP	G	A	Pts	PIM	GP	G	A	Pts	PIM
1950–51	Prince Albert Mintos	SJHL	36	6	7	13	129	6	0	4	4	16
1950–51	Prince Albert Mintos	M-Cup	—	—	—	—	—	5	0	1	1	27
1951–52	Prince Albert Mintos	SJHL	49	13	38	51	217	5	4	3	7	24
1952–53	Vancouver Canucks	WHL	3	0	3	3	8	—	—	—	—	—
1952–53	Nelson Maple Leafs	WIHL	29	3	9	12	71	3	0	0	0	6
1953–54	Saskatoon Quakers	WHL	3	1	1	2	6	—	—	—	—	—
1953–54	Moose Jaw Millers	SSHL	33	3	20	23	115	8	0	1	1	29
1954–55	Saskatoon Quakers	WHL	12	1	3	4	29	—	—	—	—	—
1954–55	Soo Indians	NOHA	30	2	7	9	64	7	1	2	3	14
1955–56	Soo Indians	NOHA	59	11	17	28	184	7	0	5	5	26
1956–57	Detroit Red Wings	NHL	13	0	0	0	6	2	0	0	0	0
1956–57	Springfield Indians	AHL	40	4	16	20	121	—	—	—	—	—
1957–58	Springfield Indians	AHL	70	4	18	22	99	13	1	2	3	18
1958–59	Springfield Indians	AHL	18	2	4	6	36	—	—	—	—	—
1959–60	Vancouver Canucks	WHL	52	2	28	30	63	11	2	8	10	16
1960–61	Vancouver Canucks	WHL	61	1	17	18	105	9	0	0	0	10
1961–62	Vancouver Canucks	WHL	25	0	12	12	45	—	—	—	—	—
1962–63	Springfield Indians	AHL	52	3	5	8	42	—	—	—	—	—
1963–64	Vancouver Canucks	WHL	70	5	20	25	76	—	—	—	—	—
1965–66	Saskatoon Quakers	SSHL	30	12	32	44	53	11	2	9	11	22
1966–67	Saskatoon Quakers	SSHL	33	17	22	39	45	14	3	9	12	36
1966–67	Portland Buckaroos	WHL	—	—	—	—	—	1	0	0	0	0
1967–68	Saskatoon Quakers	SSHL	—	3	12	15	51	—	—	—	—	—
WHL totals			226	10	84	94	332	21	2	8	10	26
NHL totals			13	0	0	0	6	2	0	0	0	0
