= Bob Turner (ice hockey) =

Canadian ice hockey player

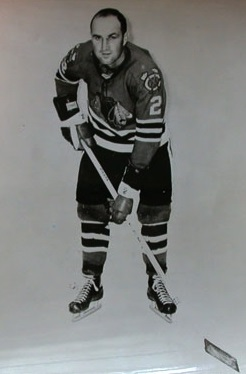
- Born: January 31, 1934 Regina, Saskatchewan, Canada
- Died: February 7, 2005 (aged 71)
- Height: 6 ft 0 in (183 cm)
- Weight: 178 lb (81 kg; 12 st 10 lb)
- Position: Defence
- Shot: Left
- Played for: Montreal Canadiens; Chicago Black Hawks
- Playing career: 1955–1964

Robert George Turner (January 31, 1934 – February 7, 2005) was a Canadian professional ice hockey defenceman. He played in the National Hockey League with the Montreal Canadiens and the Chicago Black Hawks from 1955 to 1963. He won the Stanley Cup 5 times with the Canadiens from 1956 to 1960.

== Career statistics ==
=== Regular season and playoffs ===
			Regular season					Playoffs
Season	Team	League	GP	G	A	Pts	PIM	GP	G	A	Pts	PIM
1951–52	Regina Pats	WCJHL	31	2	10	12	40	6	0	1	1	4
1952–53	Regina Pats	WCJHL	33	10	4	14	90	7	0	2	2	16
1952–53	Regina Capitals	SSHL	—	—	—	—	—	2	0	1	1	0
1952–53	Regina Capitals	Al-Cup	—	—	—	—	—	12	1	0	1	19
1953–54	Regina Pats	WCJHL	36	15	14	29	55	16	1	5	6	48
1954–55	Shawinigan Falls Cataractes	QSHL	61	4	14	18	98	13	0	2	2	4
1955–56	Montreal Canadiens	NHL	33	1	4	5	35	10	0	1	1	10
1955–56	Shawinigan Falls Cataractes	QSHL	37	6	12	18	55	—	—	—	—	—
1956–57	Montreal Canadiens	NHL	58	1	4	5	48	6	0	1	1	0
1956–57	Rochester Americans	AHL	8	0	2	2	4	—	—	—	—	—
1957–58	Montreal Canadiens	NHL	66	0	3	3	30	10	0	0	0	2
1958–59	Montreal Canadiens	NHL	68	4	24	28	66	11	0	2	2	20
1959–60	Montreal Canadiens	NHL	54	0	9	9	40	8	0	0	0	0
1960–61	Montreal Canadiens	NHL	60	2	2	4	16	5	0	0	0	0
1961–62	Chicago Black Hawks	NHL	69	8	2	10	52	12	1	0	1	6
1962–63	Chicago Black Hawks	NHL	70	3	3	6	20	6	0	0	0	6
1963–64	Buffalo Bisons	AHL	68	6	15	21	84	—	—	—	—	—
NHL totals			478	19	51	70	307	68	1	4	5	44

== Awards and achievements ==
- 1956 Stanley Cup Championship (Montreal)
- 1957 Stanley Cup Championship (Montreal)
- 1958 Stanley Cup Championship (Montreal)
- 1959 Stanley Cup Championship (Montreal)
- 1960 Stanley Cup Championship (Montreal)
- 1956 NHL All-Star (Montreal)
- 1957 NHL All-Star (Montreal)
- 1958 NHL All-Star (Montreal)
- 1959 NHL All-Star (Montreal)
- 1960 NHL All-Star (Montreal)
- 1961 NHL All-Star (Chicago)
