= 1956–57 NHL transactions =

The following is a list of all team-to-team transactions that have occurred in the National Hockey League (NHL) during the 1956–57 NHL season. It lists which team each player has been traded to and for which player(s) or other consideration(s), if applicable.

== Transactions ==
May 17, 1956^{1}	To Montreal Canadiens $30,000 cash	To Chicago Black Hawks Bud MacPherson; Ken Mosdell
May 21, 1956	To Toronto Maple Leafs $40,000 cash	To Chicago Black Hawks Harry Lumley; Eric Nesterenko
May 24, 1956^{2}	To Montreal Canadiens $5,000 cash	To Chicago Black Hawks Eddie Mazur
May 24, 1956	To Montreal Canadiens $50,000 cash	To Chicago Black Hawks Eddie Kachur; Forbes Kennedy
June 19, 1956	To Chicago Black Hawks Wally Hergesheimer	To New York Rangers Red Sullivan
July 7, 1956	To Toronto Maple Leafs cash	To Detroit Red Wings Ray Gariepy; Bob Hassard; Willie Marshall; Gilles Mayer; Jack Price; Bob Solinger
August 1, 1956	To Detroit Red Wings Tony Leswick	To Chicago Black Hawks cash
October 8, 1956	To Boston Bruins Allan Stanley	To Chicago Black Hawks cash
November 4, 1956	To Montreal Canadiens Bronco Horvath	To New York Rangers cash
January 22, 1957	To Boston Bruins Don Simmons	To New York Rangers Norm Defelice future considerations^{3} (Floyd Smith) loan of Jack Bionda
February 14, 1957	To Detroit Red Wings Al Dewsbury	To Chicago Black Hawks Bob Hassard

Notes

1. Montreal held the rights to recall the players. MacPherson returned to Montreal after training camp on October 10, 1956. Mosdell returned to Montreal on September 20, 1957.
2. Montreal held the rights to recall the player. Mazur returned to Montreal in November, 1956 (exact date unknown).
3. Transaction completed in June, 1957 (exact date unknown).
