= 1956–57 Chicago Black Hawks season =

NHL ice hockey team season

1956–57 Chicago Black Hawks
- League: 6th NHL
- 1956–57 record: 16–39–15
- Home record: 12–15–8
- Road record: 4–24–7
- Goals for: 169
- Goals against: 225

Team information
- General manager: Tommy Ivan
- Coach: Tommy Ivan
- Captain: Gus Mortson
- Arena: Chicago Stadium

Team leaders
- Goals: Ed Litzenberger (32)
- Assists: Ed Litzenberger (32)
- Points: Ed Litzenberger (64)
- Penalty minutes: Gus Mortson (147)
- Wins: Al Rollins (16)
- Goals against average: Al Rollins (3.20)

The 1956–57 Chicago Black Hawks season was the team's 31st season in the NHL, and the club was coming off their third consecutive last place finish in the league in 1955–56, as they had a 19–39–12 record, earning 50 points. The struggling Black Hawks had finished in last eight times in the past ten seasons, and only one playoff appearance since 1946.

On October 1, the Hawks announced that head coach Dick Irvin resigned as head coach of the club due to ill health. Irvin was suffering from bone cancer and had been ill for the past two years, and was hospitalized in Montreal. Tommy Ivan took over for Irvin. On May 15, 1957, Dick Irvin died at the age of 64.

The Black Hawks got off to a miserable start to the season, as they had a 2–12–1 record in their first 15 games, and sat in last place in the league. The team could never overcome their bad start, and slumped all season long, finishing the year with a 16–39–15 record, earning 47 points, and finishing in last place for the fourth straight season, and the ninth time in eleven years.

Offensively, Chicago was led by Ed Litzenberger, who led the club in goals with 32, and assists with 32, recording 64 points, which was good for fifth in the NHL. His 32 goals was the team's highest total since 1943–44. Johnny Wilson had a solid year, scoring 18 goals and 48 points, while Glen Skov also cracked the 40 point barrier, as he earned 42 points. Jack McIntyre led the defense with 18 goals and 32 points, while fellow defenceman and team captain Gus Mortson had 5 goals, 23 points, and a team high 147 penalty minutes.

In goal, Al Rollins had all the playing time, winning 16 games, while posting a 3.20 GAA, and recording 3 shutouts.

== Season standings ==
National Hockey League
		GP	W	L	T	GF	GA	DIFF	Pts
1	Detroit Red Wings	70	38	20	12	198	157	+41	88
2	Montreal Canadiens	70	35	23	12	210	155	+55	82
3	Boston Bruins	70	34	24	12	195	174	+21	80
4	New York Rangers	70	26	30	14	184	227	−43	66
5	Toronto Maple Leafs	70	21	34	15	174	192	−18	57
6	Chicago Black Hawks	70	16	39	15	169	225	−56	47

=== Record vs. opponents ===
1956–57 NHL Records
Team	BOS	CHI	DET	MTL	NYR	TOR
Boston	—	8–5–1	7–4–3	7–4–3	5–8–1	7–3–4
Chicago	5–8–1	—	2–10–2	3–8–3	1–7–6	5–6–3
Detroit	4–7–3	10–2–2	—	4–6–4	10–3–1	10–2–2
Montreal	4–7–3	8–3–3	6–4–4	—	8–5–1	9–4–1
New York	8–5–1	7–1–6	3–10–1	5–8–1	—	3–6–5
Toronto	3–7–4	6–5–3	2–10–2	4–9–1	6–3–5	—

== Schedule and results ==
1956–57 regular season
October

Game	Date	Visitor	Score	Home	Record	Points
1	October 11	Chicago Black Hawks	1–3	Detroit Red Wings	0–1–0	0
2	October 12	New York Rangers	3–0	Chicago Black Hawks	0–2–0	0
3	October 14	Toronto Maple Leafs	1–0	Chicago Black Hawks	0–3–0	0
4	October 18	Chicago Black Hawks	1–1	Montreal Canadiens	0–3–1	1
5	October 21	Chicago Black Hawks	1–4	New York Rangers	0–4–1	1
6	October 25	Chicago Black Hawks	1–3	Detroit Red Wings	0–5–1	1
7	October 27	Chicago Black Hawks	2–5	Toronto Maple Leafs	0–6–1	1
8	October 30	Boston Bruins	0–4	Chicago Black Hawks	1–6–1	3

November

Game	Date	Visitor	Score	Home	Record	Points
9	November 1	Chicago Black Hawks	2–5	Boston Bruins	1–7–1	3
10	November 3	Chicago Black Hawks	0–6	Montreal Canadiens	1–8–1	3
11	November 4	Montreal Canadiens	1–0	Chicago Black Hawks	1–9–1	3
12	November 8	Toronto Maple Leafs	2–5	Chicago Black Hawks	2–9–1	5
13	November 10	Chicago Black Hawks	1–4	Toronto Maple Leafs	2–10–1	5
14	November 11	Detroit Red Wings	3–1	Chicago Black Hawks	2–11–1	5
15	November 15	Boston Bruins	5–3	Chicago Black Hawks	2–12–1	5
16	November 17	Chicago Black Hawks	6–3	Toronto Maple Leafs	3–12–1	7
17	November 18	New York Rangers	2–2	Chicago Black Hawks	3–12–2	8
18	November 22	Montreal Canadiens	3–5	Chicago Black Hawks	4–12–2	10
19	November 24	Chicago Black Hawks	2–3	Detroit Red Wings	4–13–2	10
20	November 25	Detroit Red Wings	3–3	Chicago Black Hawks	4–13–3	11
21	November 29	Boston Bruins	2–0	Chicago Black Hawks	4–14–3	11

December

Game	Date	Visitor	Score	Home	Record	Points
22	December 1	Chicago Black Hawks	0–7	Montreal Canadiens	4–15–3	11
23	December 2	Chicago Black Hawks	2–3	Boston Bruins	4–16–3	11
24	December 5	Chicago Black Hawks	2–2	New York Rangers	4–16–4	12
25	December 7	Montreal Canadiens	3–1	Chicago Black Hawks	4–17–4	12
26	December 9	Toronto Maple Leafs	2–1	Chicago Black Hawks	4–18–4	12
27	December 13	Chicago Black Hawks	2–3	Boston Bruins	4–19–4	12
28	December 15	Chicago Black Hawks	1–5	Detroit Red Wings	4–20–4	12
29	December 16	Detroit Red Wings	1–3	Chicago Black Hawks	5–20–4	14
30	December 21	New York Rangers	3–2	Chicago Black Hawks	5–21–4	14
31	December 23	Boston Bruins	1–4	Chicago Black Hawks	6–21–4	16
32	December 25	Chicago Black Hawks	4–2	Boston Bruins	7–21–4	18
33	December 27	Chicago Black Hawks	2–3	New York Rangers	7–22–4	18
34	December 29	Chicago Black Hawks	3–6	Toronto Maple Leafs	7–23–4	18
35	December 30	Toronto Maple Leafs	0–2	Chicago Black Hawks	8–23–4	20

January

Game	Date	Visitor	Score	Home	Record	Points
36	January 1	Montreal Canadiens	6–2	Chicago Black Hawks	8–24–4	20
37	January 3	Chicago Black Hawks	3–3	Montreal Canadiens	8–24–5	21
38	January 5	Chicago Black Hawks	1–4	New York Rangers	8–25–5	21
39	January 6	Boston Bruins	4–4	Chicago Black Hawks	8–25–6	22
40	January 11	New York Rangers	7–4	Chicago Black Hawks	8–26–6	22
41	January 12	Chicago Black Hawks	3–4	Toronto Maple Leafs	8–27–6	22
42	January 13	Toronto Maple Leafs	1–1	Chicago Black Hawks	8–27–7	23
43	January 19	Detroit Red Wings	3–2	Chicago Black Hawks	8–28–7	23
44	January 20	Montreal Canadiens	2–4	Chicago Black Hawks	9–28–7	25
45	January 24	Chicago Black Hawks	2–6	Detroit Red Wings	9–29–7	25
46	January 26	Chicago Black Hawks	4–4	Montreal Canadiens	9–29–8	26
47	January 27	New York Rangers	3–2	Chicago Black Hawks	9–30–8	26
48	January 30	Chicago Black Hawks	7–2	New York Rangers	10–30–8	28
49	January 31	Chicago Black Hawks	0–2	Boston Bruins	10–31–8	28

February

Game	Date	Visitor	Score	Home	Record	Points
50	February 2	Chicago Black Hawks	3–3	Toronto Maple Leafs	10–31–9	29
51	February 3	Chicago Black Hawks	3–6	Chicago Black Hawks	11–31–9	31
52	February 7	New York Rangers	4–4	Chicago Black Hawks	11–31–10	32
53	February 9	Chicago Black Hawks	0–3	Detroit Red Wings	11–32–10	32
54	February 10	Detroit Red Wings	2–2	Chicago Black Hawks	11–32–11	33
55	February 16	Boston Bruins	5–6	Chicago Black Hawks	12–32–11	35
56	February 17	Montreal Canadiens	3–2	Chicago Black Hawks	12–33–11	35
57	February 23	Detroit Red Wings	3–4	Chicago Black Hawks	13–33–11	37
58	February 24	Boston Bruins	3–4	Chicago Black Hawks	14–33–11	39
59	February 27	Chicago Black Hawks	6–6	New York Rangers	14–33–12	40
60	February 28	Chicago Black Hawks	0–4	Boston Bruins	14–34–12	40

March

Game	Date	Visitor	Score	Home	Record	Points
61	March 2	Chicago Black Hawks	4–3	Toronto Maple Leafs	15–34–12	42
62	March 3	Toronto Maple Leafs	0–0	Chicago Black Hawks	15–34–13	43
63	March 7	New York Rangers	2–2	Chicago Black Hawks	15–34–14	44
64	March 9	Chicago Black Hawks	4–6	Montreal Canadiens	15–35–14	44
65	March 10	Montreal Canadiens	1–3	Chicago Black Hawks	16–35–14	46
66	March 12	Detroit Red Wings	4–3	Chicago Black Hawks	16–36–14	46
67	March 14	Chicago Black Hawks	2–3	Detroit Red Wings	16–37–14	46
68	March 17	Chicago Black Hawks	2–6	Boston Bruins	16–38–14	46
69	March 23	Chicago Black Hawks	0–3	Montreal Canadiens	16–39–14	46
70	March 24	Chicago Black Hawks	4–4	New York Rangers	16–39–15	47

Legend: Win (2 points) Loss (0 points) Tie (1 point)

== Season stats ==
=== Scoring leaders ===
Player	GP	G	A	Pts	PIM
Ed Litzenberger	70	32	32	64	48
Johnny Wilson	70	18	30	48	24
Glen Skov	67	14	28	42	69
Nick Mickoski	70	16	20	36	24
Jack McIntyre	70	18	14	32	32

=== Goaltending ===
Player	GP	TOI	W	L	T	GA	SO	GAA
Al Rollins	70	4200	16	39	15	224	3	3.20

== Sources ==
- Hockey-Reference
- National Hockey League Guide & Record Book 2007
