= Leo Boivin =

Canadian ice hockey player (1931–2021)

- Hockey Hall of Fame, 1986
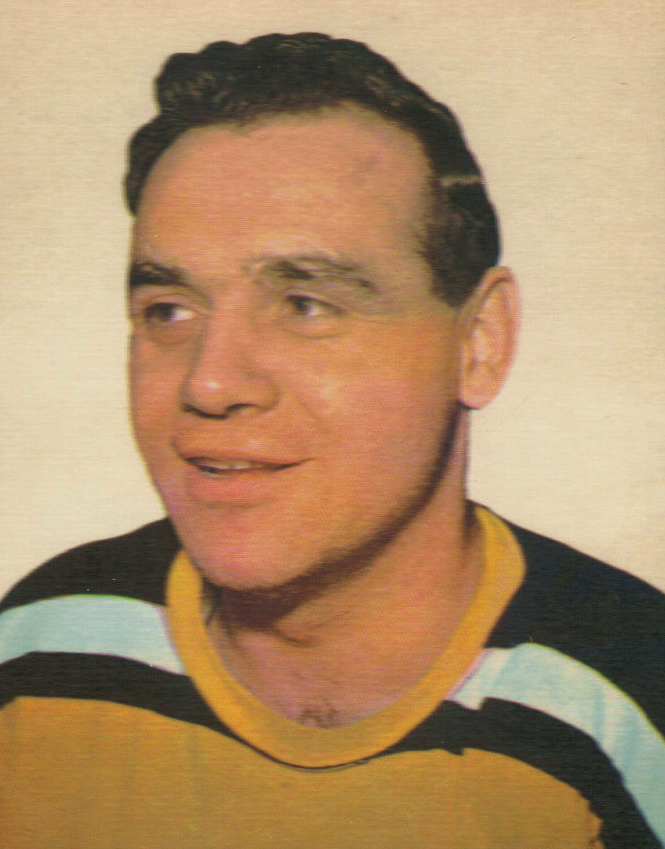
- Boivin with the Boston Bruins in 1962
- Born: August 2, 1931 Prescott, Ontario, Canada
- Died: October 16, 2021 (aged 90) Brockville, Ontario, Canada
- Height: 5 ft 7 in (170 cm)
- Weight: 177 lb (80 kg; 12 st 9 lb)
- Position: Defence
- Shot: Left
- Played for: Toronto Maple Leafs; Boston Bruins; Detroit Red Wings; Pittsburgh Penguins; Minnesota North Stars
- Playing career: 1951–1970

Leo Joseph Boivin (August 2, 1931 – October 16, 2021) was a Canadian professional ice hockey defenceman and coach who played 19 seasons in the National Hockey League (NHL). He played for the Toronto Maple Leafs, Boston Bruins, Detroit Red Wings, Pittsburgh Penguins, and Minnesota North Stars from 1952 to 1970.

== Playing career ==
Boivin was born in Prescott, Ontario, on August 2, 1931. He began playing hockey at seven years of age on the rivers and outdoor ice surfaces of Prescott, near Ottawa. He began his junior career in 1948–49 with the Inkerman Rockets of the Ontario Valley Junior Hockey League. He was scouted by the Boston Bruins during a pre-season competition and was signed by the franchise in 1949. He subsequently played for the Port Arthur Bruins of the Thunder Bay Junior A Hockey League for two seasons. His rights were later traded to the Toronto Maple Leafs on November 16, 1950.

== Professional career ==
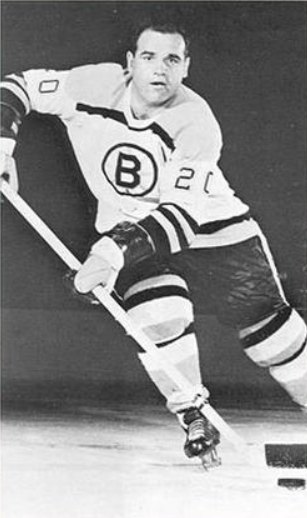
Boivin in 1960s photo for Boston Bruins

Boivin started the 1951–52 season playing for the Pittsburgh Hornets of the American Hockey League (AHL), before being promoted to the Leafs. The franchise had lost hard-hitting blue-liner Bill Barilko in the summer of 1951 when he disappeared on a fishing trip, and the Toronto brass felt Boivin's physical style could help fill that void. Boivin made his NHL debut for the Leafs on March 8, 1952. He only played in one other game that season, but featured regularly for the Leafs the following year. Early in the 1954–55 season, Boivin was traded back to the Bruins in exchange for Joe Klukay.

Back in Boston, Boivin enjoyed his best years as a feared member of the Boston Bruins blue line and helped lead them to two Stanley Cup Finals in the late 1950s. Boivin starred with other Boston defensive stalwarts Allan Stanley, Fern Flaman, Doug Mohns and Bob Armstrong. He remained the anchor of a youthful Bruins defensive corps during the difficult reconstructive period of the early 1960s. Boivin became captain of the Boston Bruins in 1963. In February 1966, he was traded to the Detroit Red Wings in a five-player trade. He recounted: "I had been in Boston for a long time and they were struggling. (General Manager) Hap Emms asked me if I would go to Detroit. It was near the (trade) deadline. (Doug) Barkley lost his eye that year and Sid Abel wanted me to go there. I said, 'Sure, I'll go to Detroit.' It was quite a feeling to go in there because they had guys like (Gordie) Howe and (Alex) Delvecchio that I had hit hard through the years. But they welcomed me with open arms. I really enjoyed playing there." That spring, Boivin helped the Red Wings to the Stanley Cup Final, where they lost to the Montreal Canadiens.

After one more season with Detroit, Boivin's career was winding down but age 35, he was given a chance to extend his career when the league doubled in size by adding six new franchises for the 1967–68 campaign. Boivin found a new home when he was selected by the Pittsburgh Penguins in 1967 NHL Expansion Draft. He recalled how "after sixteen years in the six-team league, expansion added on to my career. At that time, there were a lot of players playing in the American Hockey League that were great players who just didn't get a chance." He spent a season and a half with the Penguins before moving on for a final time when he was traded to the Minnesota North Stars, another expansion club. After the North Stars were defeated in the quarterfinals of the 1970 playoffs, Boivin retired. He declined the opportunity to extend his career with the newly established Buffalo Sabres.

== Later life ==
After retiring from professional hockey in 1970, Boivin became a scout in his hometown. He also served as interim coach of the St. Louis Blues during the 1975–76 and 1977–78 seasons. He later coached the Ottawa 67's of the Ontario Hockey League for a brief period, tutoring young defencemen Denis Potvin and Ian Turnbull.

Boivin was inducted into the Hockey Hall of Fame in September 1986. The arena in his hometown was consequently retitled the Leo Boivin Community Centre in honour of him that same year. He worked as a scout until his retirement in 1993 with the Hartford Whalers. He attended Ottawa Senators games annually in his later years. Boivin died on October 16, 2021, at the age of 90.

In 2023 he would be named one of the top 100 Bruins players of all time.

== Career statistics ==
			Regular season					Playoffs
Season	Team	League	GP	G	A	Pts	PIM	GP	G	A	Pts	PIM
1948–49	Inkerman Rockets	OVJHL	—	—	—	—	—	—	—	—	—	—
1948–49	Inkerman Rockets	M-Cup	—	—	—	—	—	4	2	0	2	0
1949–50	Port Arthur Bruins	TBJHL	18	4	4	8	32	5	0	3	3	10
1949–50	Port Arthur Bruins	M-Cup	—	—	—	—	—	16	6	4	10	12
1950–51	Port Arthur Bruins	TBJHL	20	16	11	27	37	13	3	6	9	28
1950–51	Port Arthur Bruins	M-Cup	—	—	—	—	—	7	1	3	4	16
1951–52	Toronto Maple Leafs	NHL	2	0	1	1	0	—	—	—	—	—
1951–52	Pittsburgh Hornets	AHL	30	2	3	5	32	10	0	1	1	16
1952–53	Toronto Maple Leafs	NHL	70	2	13	15	97	—	—	—	—	—
1953–54	Toronto Maple Leafs	NHL	58	1	6	7	81	5	0	0	0	2
1954–55	Toronto Maple Leafs	NHL	7	0	0	0	8	—	—	—	—	—
1954–55	Boston Bruins	NHL	59	6	11	17	105	5	0	1	1	4
1955–56	Boston Bruins	NHL	68	4	16	20	80	—	—	—	—	—
1956–57	Boston Bruins	NHL	55	2	8	10	55	10	2	3	5	12
1957–58	Boston Bruins	NHL	33	0	4	4	54	12	0	3	3	21
1958–59	Boston Bruins	NHL	70	5	16	21	94	7	1	2	3	4
1959–60	Boston Bruins	NHL	70	4	21	25	66	—	—	—	—	—
1960–61	Boston Bruins	NHL	57	6	17	23	50	—	—	—	—	—
1961–62	Boston Bruins	NHL	65	5	18	23	70	—	—	—	—	—
1962–63	Boston Bruins	NHL	62	2	24	26	48	—	—	—	—	—
1963–64	Boston Bruins	NHL	65	10	14	24	42	—	—	—	—	—
1964–65	Boston Bruins	NHL	67	3	10	13	68	—	—	—	—	—
1965–66	Boston Bruins	NHL	46	0	5	5	34	—	—	—	—	—
1965–66	Detroit Red Wings	NHL	16	0	5	5	16	12	0	1	1	16
1966–67	Detroit Red Wings	NHL	69	4	17	21	78	—	—	—	—	—
1967–68	Pittsburgh Penguins	NHL	73	9	13	22	74	—	—	—	—	—
1968–69	Pittsburgh Penguins	NHL	41	5	13	18	26	—	—	—	—	—
1968–69	Minnesota North Stars	NHL	28	1	6	7	16	—	—	—	—	—
1969–70	Minnesota North Stars	NHL	69	3	12	15	30	3	0	0	0	0
NHL totals			1,150	72	250	322	1,192	54	3	10	13	59

== Coaching record ==
Team	Year	Regular season						Post season
Team	Year	G	W	L	T	Pts	Division rank	Result
St. Louis Blues	1975–76	43	17	17	9	(43)	3rd in Smythe	Lost in preliminary round
St. Louis Blues	1977–78	54	11	36	7	(29)	4th in Smythe	(fired)
Total		97	28	53	16			

== See also ==
- List of NHL players with 1,000 games played

Preceded by Don McKenney	Boston Bruins captain 1963–66	Succeeded by John Bucyk
Preceded by Lynn Patrick; Emile Francis	Head coach of the St. Louis Blues; 1976; 1977–78	Succeeded by Emile Francis; Barclay Plager
