= Jack Caffery (ice hockey) =

Canadian ice hockey player (1934–1992)

- Born: June 30, 1934 Kingston, Ontario, Canada
- Died: December 2, 1992 (aged 58)
- Height: 6 ft 0 in (183 cm)
- Weight: 165 lb (75 kg; 11 st 11 lb)
- Position: Centre
- Shot: Right
- Played for: Toronto Maple Leafs; Boston Bruins
- Playing career: 1954–1964

John James "Jack" Caffery (June 30, 1934 — December 2, 1992) was a Canadian professional ice hockey player who played 57 games in the National Hockey League for the Toronto Maple Leafs and Boston Bruins during the 1950s. Jack was the brother of the hockey player Terry Caffery.

== Career statistics ==
=== Regular season and playoffs ===
			Regular season					Playoffs
Season	Team	League	GP	G	A	Pts	PIM	GP	G	A	Pts	PIM
1950–51	St. Michael's Buzzers	MJBHL	—	—	—	—	—	—	—	—	—	—
1950–51	St. Michael's Majors	OHA	1	0	0	0	0	—	—	—	—	—
1951–52	St. Michael's Buzzers	MJBHL	—	—	—	—	—	—	—	—	—	—
1951–52	St. Michael's Majors	OHA	1	2	1	3	0	1	0	0	0	0
1952–53	St. Michael's Majors	OHA	56	37	39	76	38	17	7	10	17	9
1953–54	St. Michael's Majors	OHA	54	25	34	59	40	8	5	8	13	11
1954–55	Toronto Maple Leafs	NHL	3	0	0	0	0	—	—	—	—	—
1954–55	Pittsburgh Hornets	AHL	55	15	11	26	52	9	2	2	4	4
1955–56	Pittsburgh Hornets	AHL	58	18	22	40	62	4	1	0	1	0
1956–57	Boston Bruins	NHL	47	2	2	4	20	10	1	0	1	4
1957–58	Boston Bruins	NHL	7	1	0	1	2	—	—	—	—	—
1957–58	Springfield Indians	AHL	46	13	22	35	22	13	2	3	5	10
1960–61	Springfield Indians	AHL	38	6	10	16	10	8	1	3	4	0
1963–64	Greensboro Generals	EHL	38	2	14	16	21	—	—	—	—	—
AHL totals			197	52	65	117	146	34	6	8	14	14
NHL totals			57	3	2	5	22	10	1	0	1	4
