= Jean Béliveau =

Canadian ice hockey player (1931–2014)

CC GOQ Jean Béliveau
- Hockey Hall of Fame, 1972
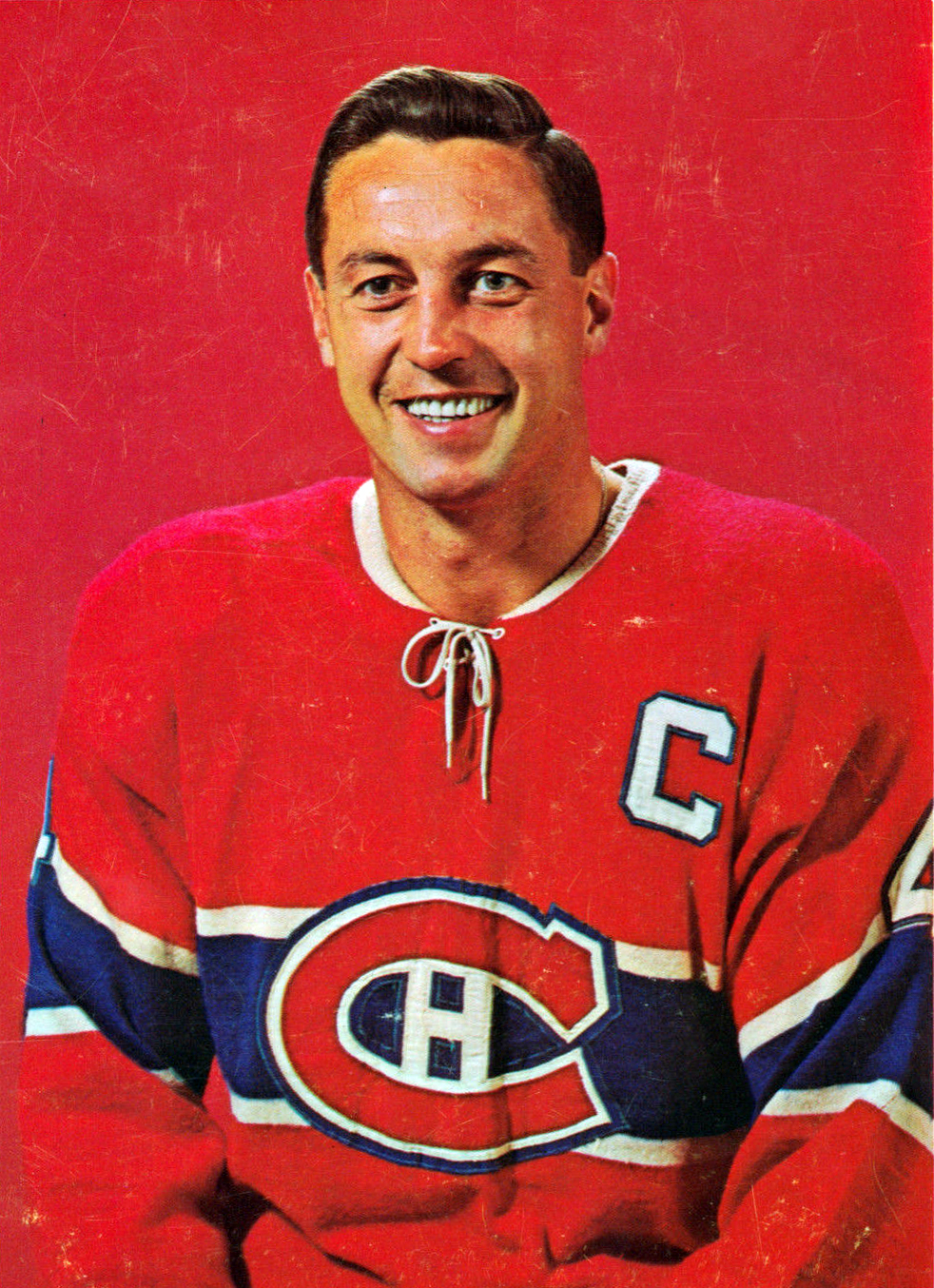
- Béliveau with the Montreal Canadiens, c. 1963
- Born: August 31, 1931 Trois-Rivières, Quebec, Canada
- Died: December 2, 2014 (aged 83) Longueuil, Quebec, Canada
- Height: 6 ft 3 in (191 cm)
- Weight: 205 lb (93 kg; 14 st 9 lb)
- Position: Centre
- Shot: Left
- Played for: Montreal Canadiens
- Playing career: 1950–1971

Joseph Arthur Jean Béliveau CC GOQ (August 31, 1931 – December 2, 2014) was a Canadian professional ice hockey player who played parts of 20 seasons with the National Hockey League's (NHL) Montreal Canadiens from 1950 to 1971. Inducted into the Hockey Hall of Fame in 1972, "Le Gros Bill" Béliveau is widely regarded as one of the ten greatest NHL players of all time. Born in Trois-Rivières, Quebec, Béliveau first played professionally in the Quebec Major Hockey League (QMHL). He made his NHL debut with the Canadiens in 1950, but chose to remain in the QMHL full-time until 1953. From 1950 to 1971, he spent his entire NHL career with the Canadiens.

By his second season in the NHL, Béliveau was among the top three scorers. He was the fourth player to score 500 goals and the second to score 1,000 points. Béliveau won two Hart Memorial Trophies as league MVP (1956, 1964) and one Art Ross Trophy as top scorer (1956), as well as the inaugural Conn Smythe Trophy as play-off MVP (1965). After his retirement as a player, he became an executive with the franchise for an additional twenty-two seasons. From 1950 to 1993, Béliveau won a combined total of 17 Stanley Cup Championships, 10 as a player, and 7 as an executive, the most by any individual. Béliveau is tied with MLB legend Frankie Crosetti for the most combined championships in sports. In 2017, Béliveau was named one of the '100 Greatest NHL Players' in history.

== Early life ==
Béliveau was born in Trois-Rivières, Quebec, on August 31, 1931, the son of Arthur Béliveau and Lorette Dubé. Arthur worked as an electrician, installing power lines for Shawinigan Water and Power. This work had the family moving several times while Béliveau was young, moving to Plessisville when he was 3 years old and then to Victoriaville at the age of 6. Like many future hockey players of the era, the Béliveau family had a backyard ice rink on which their children, friends, and neighbours played shinny. Until he was twelve years old, the family rink was where Jean learned to play hockey. His first organized team was in a house league at L'Académie, which played on the school's rink. As part of a squad of L'Académie "all-stars," Jean played against other local teams. At age fifteen, he entered college and played for its team and an intermediate team, the Victoriaville Panthers. In 1947, he joined the junior Victoriaville Tigres. In the 1948–49 season, his second with the team, Béliveau placed seventh in the league in scoring with 75 points in 42 games. Prior to the 1949–50 season he joined the Quebec Citadelles. With 80 points in 35 games, Béliveau finished second in league scoring, behind Bernard Geoffrion. It was around this time that he acquired the nickname "Le Gros Bill (French: Big Bill). Coined by journalist Roland Sabourin, the name came from the Quebecois film Le Gros Bill, which was released in 1949.

In the summertime as a child, Béliveau also played baseball. A stand-out in local leagues in Victoriaville, he pitched and occasionally played infield, well enough that his family turned down an offer of a minor-league pro contract for Jean at age fifteen. At sixteen, Jean played for the senior league team in Val-d'Or, Quebec.

== Playing career ==
Béliveau was already a star at 15 when spotted by Canadiens general manager Frank Selke, who sought to sign him to an NHL "C-form". The standard league contract for young players at that time, it would have required Béliveau to join the Canadiens at a set date and agreed-upon salary. When his father balked, Béliveau signed a "B-form" instead, agreeing to play for Montreal should he ever decide to turn pro.

Béliveau was called up twice for brief appearances by the Canadiens in 1950–51 and 1952–53, each time playing the maximum number of games that an amateur could play at the professional level. He led the Quebec Senior Hockey League in scoring in 1953. However, he did not appear to show much interest in playing professionally. Finally, Selke got an idea—if the QSHL were somehow turned into a professional league, Béliveau would be a professional as well, and under the terms of the B-form he would have to sign with the Habs. At Selke's suggestion, the Canadiens' owners, the Canadian Arena Company, bought the QSHL and converted it from an amateur league to a minor pro league. This forced Béliveau to join the Canadiens for the 1953–54 NHL season (though the Habs owned the NHL rights to all of the league's players in any case).

Béliveau retired at the end of the 1970–71 NHL season as his team's all-time leader in points, second all-time in goals and the NHL's all-time leading playoff scorer. He scored 507 goals and had 712 assists for 1,219 points in 1,125 NHL regular-season games plus 79 goals and 97 assists for 176 points in 162 playoff games. His jersey number (#4) was retired on October 9, 1971. In 1972, he was inducted into the Hockey Hall of Fame. He is now the second all-time leading scorer in Canadiens history, behind Guy Lafleur. Only Henri Richard (1256 games) and Larry Robinson (1202 games) played more games for the Habs. Béliveau's name appears on the Stanley Cup a record seventeen times, including seven times as an executive for the Canadiens: 1973, 1976, 1977, 1978, 1979, 1986, 1993. In addition to winning the Hart Trophy as league MVP twice, he finished second in the voting a further four times, and third once. As well, in addition to winning the Art Ross Trophy as the leading scorer once, he finished second twice and third four times, illustrating his remarkable long-term consistency. In 1998, The Hockey News named Béliveau the seventh greatest NHL player of all time. Upon his retirement, the Canadiens named Béliveau a vice president and director of public relations.

Béliveau was never known as an activist during his playing days. However, he was one of several players who threatened to pull out of the Hall of Fame if disgraced ex-NHLPA executive director Alan Eagleson had been allowed to stay in after being convicted of fraud and embezzlement. He also supported the NHL's position during the 2004–05 NHL lockout, arguing that the players' demands would damage the sport and the league.

== Personal life and death ==
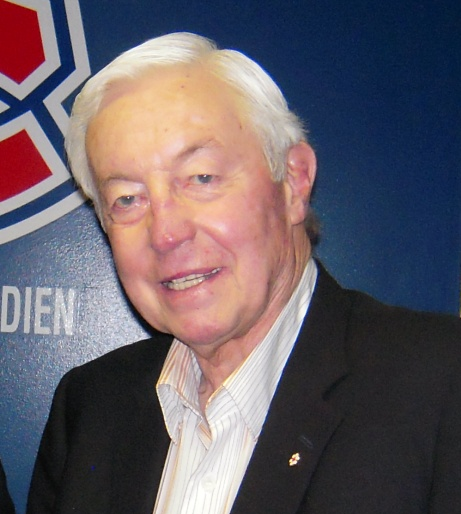
Béliveau in 2009

Béliveau met his future wife, Élise Couture, in 1950 in Quebec City. The couple married on June 27, 1953, at Saint-Patrick Church there, and had one child together, daughter Hélène. In 1957, Béliveau appeared in full uniform on the American game show To Tell the Truth.

Upon retiring as a player in 1971 Béliveau set up the charitable Jean Béliveau Foundation, transferred two decades later to the Society for Disabled Children in 1993.

In the early 1990s, he twice declined Canadian Prime Minister Brian Mulroney’s offer of a Senate appointment, as he believed legislators should only be elected. In 1994, Prime Minister Jean Chrétien offered him the post of Governor General of Canada. Béliveau declined in order to be with his daughter and two grandchildren, Mylène and Magalie, whose father, a Quebec policeman, had committed suicide when the girls were five and three.

Beginning in the 1990s, Béliveau suffered from multiple health issues. He was first hospitalized for cardiac problems in 1996. In 2000, he was treated for a neck tumour. NHL.com reported on January 21, 2010, that Béliveau was admitted to Montréal General Hospital the previous evening with an apparent stroke that was not thought to be life-threatening. Béliveau was hospitalized with a stroke again on February 28, 2012. He also had cancer later in life, discussing it in an interview with François Gagnon.

Béliveau died on December 2, 2014, at the age of 83, in Longueuil, a suburb of Montreal. His public funeral was held at Mary Queen of the World Cathedral in Montreal.

== Legacy ==
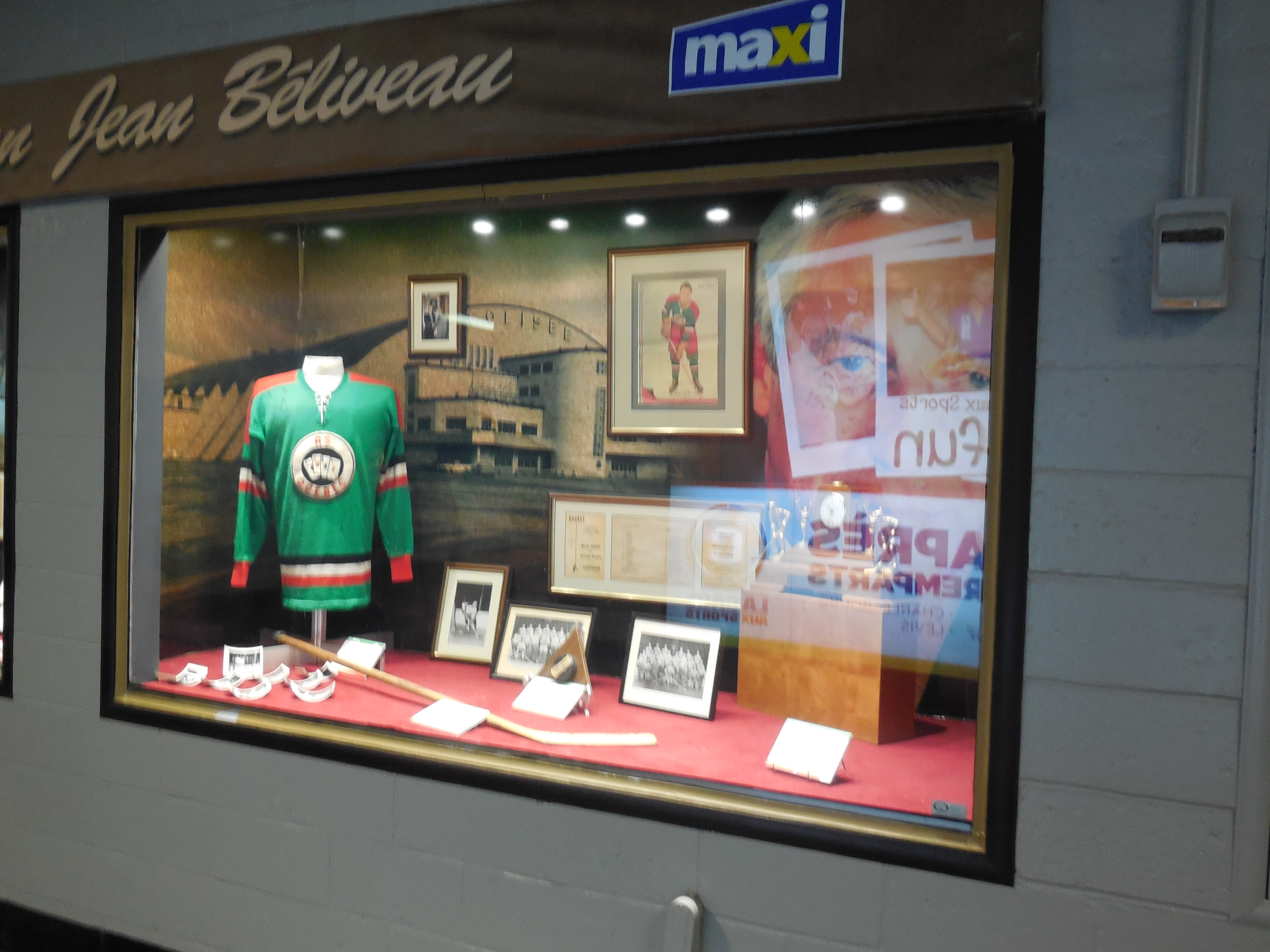
Béliveau memorabilia inside Colisée Pepsi.

Béliveau was given many awards, including several honorary doctorates from Canadian universities, plus the Loyola Medal from Concordia University in 1995. He was made a Knight of the National Order of Quebec in 1988, promoted to Officer in 2006 and Grand Officer in 2010.

On May 6, 1998, Béliveau was made by Governor General Roméo LeBlanc a Companion of the Order of Canada, then the country's highest civilian award. In 2001, his name was added to Canada's Walk of Fame, the same year he was honoured with his portrait on a Canadian postage stamp. In August 2008, the Canadian Pacific Railway named a station in his honour. On June 29, 2009, he was named an honorary captain of the men's national team for the 2010 Winter Olympics.

== Career statistics ==
=== Regular season and playoffs ===
			Regular season					Playoffs
Season	Team	League	GP	G	A	Pts	PIM	GP	G	A	Pts	PIM
1947–48	Victoriaville Tigres	QJHL	42	46	21	67	—	—	—	—	—	—
1948–49	Victoriaville Tigres	QJHL	42	48	27	75	54	4	4	2	6	2
1949–50	Quebec Citadelles	QJHL	35	36	44	80	47	14	22	9	31	15
1950–51	Quebec Citadelles	QJHL	46	61	63	124	120	22	23	31	54	76
1950–51	Quebec Aces	QSHL	1	2	1	3	0	—	—	—	—	—
1950–51	Montreal Canadiens	NHL	2	1	1	2	0	—	—	—	—	—
1951–52	Quebec Aces	QSHL	59	45	38	83	88	15	14	10	24	14
1952–53	Quebec Aces	QSHL	57	50	39	89	59	19	14	15	29	25
1952–53	Montreal Canadiens	NHL	3	5	0	5	0	—	—	—	—	—
1953–54	Montreal Canadiens	NHL	44	13	21	34	22	10	2	8	10	4
1954–55	Montreal Canadiens	NHL	70	37	36	73	58	12	6	7	13	18
1955–56	Montreal Canadiens	NHL	70	47	41	88	143	10	12	7	19	22
1956–57	Montreal Canadiens	NHL	69	33	51	84	105	10	6	6	12	15
1957–58	Montreal Canadiens	NHL	55	27	32	59	93	10	4	8	12	10
1958–59	Montreal Canadiens	NHL	64	45	46	91	67	3	1	4	5	4
1959–60	Montreal Canadiens	NHL	60	34	40	74	57	8	5	2	7	6
1960–61	Montreal Canadiens	NHL	69	32	58	90	57	6	0	5	5	0
1961–62	Montreal Canadiens	NHL	43	18	23	41	36	6	2	1	3	4
1962–63	Montreal Canadiens	NHL	69	18	49	67	68	5	2	1	3	2
1963–64	Montreal Canadiens	NHL	68	28	50	78	42	5	2	0	2	18
1964–65	Montreal Canadiens	NHL	58	20	23	43	76	13	8	8	16	34
1965–66	Montreal Canadiens	NHL	67	29	48	77	50	10	5	5	10	6
1966–67	Montreal Canadiens	NHL	53	12	26	38	22	10	6	5	11	26
1967–68	Montreal Canadiens	NHL	59	31	37	68	28	10	7	4	11	6
1968–69	Montreal Canadiens	NHL	69	33	49	82	55	14	5	10	15	8
1969–70	Montreal Canadiens	NHL	63	19	30	49	10	—	—	—	—	—
1970–71	Montreal Canadiens	NHL	70	25	51	76	40	20	6	16	22	28
NHL totals			1,125	507	712	1,219	1,029	162	79	97	176	211

== Awards and honours ==
National Hockey League
Award	Year	Ref.
Played in the NHL All-Star Game	13x between 1953 and 1969	
First team All-Star	1954–55, 1955–56; 1956–57, 1958–59; 1959–60, 1960–61	
Second Team All-Star	1957–58, 1963–64; 1965–66, 1968–69	
Art Ross Trophy	1955–56	
Hart Memorial Trophy	1955–56, 1963–64	
Conn Smythe Trophy	1964–65	
NHL Lifetime Achievement Award	2009	
Stanley Cup	1956, 1957, 1958, 1959, 1960, 1965, 1966, 1968, 1969, 1971	

== See also ==
- List of NHL players with 500 goals
- List of NHL players with 1,000 points
- List of NHL players with 1,000 games played
- List of NHL statistical leaders
- List of members of the Hockey Hall of Fame
- List of NHL players who spent their entire career with one franchise

Preceded by Doug Harvey	Montreal Canadiens captain 1961–71	Succeeded by Henri Richard
Preceded by inaugural winner	Winner of the Conn Smythe Trophy; 1965	Succeeded by Roger Crozier
Preceded by Gordie Howe	Winner of the Hart Memorial Trophy; 1964	Succeeded by Bobby Hull
Preceded by Ted Kennedy	Winner of the Hart Trophy; 1956	Succeeded by Gordie Howe
Preceded by Bernie Geoffrion	Winner of the Art Ross Trophy; 1956	Succeeded by Gordie Howe
