= 1956–57 NHL season =

National Hockey League season

- League: National Hockey League
- Sport: Ice hockey
- Duration: October 11, 1956 – April 16, 1957
- Games: 70
- Teams: 6
- TV partner(s): CBC, SRC (Canada); CBS (United States)

Regular season
- Season champion: Detroit Red Wings
- Season MVP: Gordie Howe (Red Wings)
- Top scorer: Gordie Howe (Red Wings)

Stanley Cup
- Champions: Montreal Canadiens
- Runners-up: Boston Bruins

NHL seasons
- ← 1955–56 1957–58 →

The 1956–57 NHL season was the 40th season of the National Hockey League. Six teams played 70 games each. The Montreal Canadiens won the Stanley Cup for the second consecutive season, defeating the Boston Bruins four games to one in the best-of-seven final series. The final game was won with a clutch goal from Montreal defenceman Tom Johnson that clinched the Stanley Cup championship for the Canadiens 3–2.

== Regular season ==
On October 1, it was announced that Dick Irvin had resigned as coach of the Chicago Black Hawks due to ill health. He was suffering from bone cancer and had been ill for two years and had been hospitalized in Montreal. Irvin had been several days late to training camp. General manager Tommy Ivan took over as coach. Later in the season, it was reported that Irvin had undergone minor surgery for anemia at Ross Memorial Hospital. Irvin died on May 15, 1957.

Ted Lindsay, the star left winger of the Detroit Red Wings, became the fourth player to score 300 career goals on November 18, when he picked up two goals in an 8–3 pasting of the Montreal Canadiens. The other players to reach this prestigious mark were Nels Stewart, Maurice Richard, and Gordie Howe (who played opposite Lindsay for most of the latter's career).

On January 5, the Black Hawks and New York Rangers played an afternoon game at Madison Square Garden where the Rangers beat the Black Hawks 4–1. This game was broadcast on the Columbia Broadcast System network (CBS). Glen Skov spoiled Lorne "Gump" Worsley's would-be shutout with a goal in the third period.

Montreal beat Toronto 2–1 at the Forum in Montreal on January 10 and moved into first place. The game was hard-fought and referee Frank Udvari found it necessary to rule with an iron hand that angered the fans. Fans thought he was calling chippy penalties against the Habs and deliberately failing to call hooking and holding penalties by the Maple Leafs. The blow-off came in the last two minutes of the game. Maurice Richard received a high-sticking penalty. At 18:14, knowing his Maple Leafs were in danger, Toronto coach Howie Meeker pulled goaltender Ed Chadwick for six attackers. Dick Duff scored the tying goal, and Richard went berserk and commenced a heated argument with Udvari, banging his stick on the ice. He might have attacked Udvari if his teammates had not restrained him. Fans threw programmes, paper cups, hats and other debris and the game was held up. When it did resume, Bernie "Boom Boom" Geoffrion set up Donnie Marshall for the winning goal with a mere six seconds left to play. Although the fans were pleased with the outcome, an angry hum commenced as the players and officials left the ice. Udvari had to be escorted to his dressing room by police and ushers. A large part of the crowd now directed its attention to NHL President Clarence Campbell seated in his box seat and he became the target of jeers and threats. The situation began to show some of the aspects of the Richard Riot of two years previous when Richard had been suspended for an attack on an official. It was at least 30 minutes before Campbell was able to leave under police protection.

Terry Sawchuk had been playing well and was a candidate for the Hart Trophy, when he came down with mononucleosis. He came back too soon and by January 16, he announced his retirement from hockey, a temporary one as he would be back in Detroit next season.

Glenn Hall was not as good as the previous season, but led the Detroit Red Wings to first place. Hall had played only two games prior to 1955–56, but had shown such promise Sawchuk was sent off.

=== Rule changes ===
At the start of this season, the NHL changed the way power plays work. Prior to this season, a team could score as many goals as they were able to in a two-minute power play with the penalized player remaining in the penalty box. The NHL changed it so that when a goal is scored on a two-minute power play, the power play is finished. The reason for this was because the Montreal Canadiens were so dominant on the power play, that the NHL needed a way of ensuring parity. The previous season saw the Canadiens score 26% of all the league's power-play goals. Oddly enough, the number of power-play goals league-wide actually increased from 251 to 265 after the rule changed. Montreal, though, scored 10 fewer power-play goals.

=== Final standings ===
National Hockey League
		GP	W	L	T	GF	GA	DIFF	Pts
1	Detroit Red Wings	70	38	20	12	198	157	+41	88
2	Montreal Canadiens	70	35	23	12	210	155	+55	82
3	Boston Bruins	70	34	24	12	195	174	+21	80
4	New York Rangers	70	26	30	14	184	227	−43	66
5	Toronto Maple Leafs	70	21	34	15	174	192	−18	57
6	Chicago Black Hawks	70	16	39	15	169	225	−56	47

== Playoffs ==
=== Playoff bracket ===
The top four teams in the league qualified for the playoffs. In the semifinals, the first-place team played the third-place team, while the second-place team faced the fourth-place team, with the winners advancing to the Stanley Cup Finals. In both rounds, teams competed in a best-of-seven series (scores in the bracket indicate the number of games won in each best-of-seven series).

Semifinals
1	Detroit	1
3	Boston	4
2	Montreal	4
4	New York	1

Stanley Cup Finals
3	Boston	1
2	Montreal	4

=== Semifinals ===
==== (1) Detroit Red Wings vs. (3) Boston Bruins ====
March 26	Boston Bruins	3–1	Detroit Red Wings	Olympia Stadium	Recap
Jack Caffery (1) – 18:42		First period	00:50 – Ted Lindsay (1)
Doug Mohns (1) – pp – 00:38		Second period	No scoring
Real Chevrefils (1) – 00:49		Third period	No scoring
Don Simmons 20 saves / 21 shots		Goalie stats	Glenn Hall 26 saves / 29 shots

March 28	Boston Bruins	2–7	Detroit Red Wings	Olympia Stadium	Recap
No scoring		First period	06:57 – Red Kelly (1); 11:32 – Gordie Howe (1); 13:14 – sh – Metro Prystai (1)
No scoring		Second period	03:50 – pp – Alex Delvecchio (1); 10:27 – pp – Billy Dea (1)
Fleming MacKell (1) – 01:59; Leo Boivin (1) – 17:52		Third period	00:33 – pp – Lorne Ferguson (1); 03:39 – Norm Ullman (1)
Don Simmons 25 saves / 32 shots		Goalie stats	Glenn Hall 30 saves / 32 shots

March 31	Detroit Red Wings	3–4	Boston Bruins	Boston Garden	Recap
Alex Delvecchio (2) – pp – 15:16		First period	08:11 – Vic Stasiuk (1); 12:00 – Leo Boivin (2)
No scoring		Second period	18:26 – Leo Labine (1)
Gordie Howe (2) – 01:32; Billy Dea (2) – 03:11		Third period	13:28 – Cal Gardner (1)
Glenn Hall 22 saves / 26 shots		Goalie stats	Don Simmons 24 saves / 27 shots

April 2	Detroit Red Wings	0–2	Boston Bruins	Boston Garden	Recap
No scoring		First period	06:00 – Real Chevrefils (2)
No scoring		Second period	No scoring
No scoring		Third period	05:43 – Vic Stasiuk (2)
Glenn Hall 25 saves / 27 shots		Goalie stats	Don Simmons 20 saves / 20 shots

April 4	Boston Bruins	4–3	Detroit Red Wings	Olympia Stadium	Recap
No scoring		First period	09:52 – Alex Delvecchio (3)
Buddy Boone (1) – 12:10		Second period	No scoring
Leo Labine (2) – 06:18; Doug Mohns (2) – 10:21; Cal Gardner (2) – 15:16		Third period	00:36 – Ted Lindsay (2); 17:59 – Metro Prystai (2)
Don Simmons 23 saves / 26 shots		Goalie stats	Glenn Hall 11 saves / 15 shots

Boston won series 4–1

==== (2) Montreal Canadiens vs. (4) New York Rangers ====
March 26	Montreal Canadiens	4–1	New York Rangers	Madison Square Garden III	Recap
Bernie Geoffrion (1) – 15:07		First period	17:01 – Camille Henry (1)
No scoring		Second period	No scoring
Maurice Richard (1) – pp – 07:02; Bernie Geoffrion (2) – en – 19:21; Jean Beliveau (1) – 19:30		Third period	No scoring
Jacques Plante 25 saves / 26 shots		Goalie stats	Gump Worsley 24 saves / 27 shots

March 28	Montreal Canadiens	3–4	OT	New York Rangers	Madison Square Garden III	Recap
No scoring		First period		No scoring
Henri Richard (1) – 02:12; Maurice Richard (2) – 14:11		Second period		01:35 – pp – Camille Henry (2); 04:32 – Dave Creighton (1)
Bernie Geoffrion (3) – pp – 14:58		Third period		04:58 – pp – Bill Gadsby (1)
No scoring		First overtime period		13:38 – Andy Hebenton (1)
Jacques Plante 34 saves / 38 shots		Goalie stats		Gump Worsley 44 saves / 47 shots

March 30	New York Rangers	3–8	Montreal Canadiens	Montreal Forum	Recap
Andy Bathgate (1) – 18:59		First period	07:27 – pp – Maurice Richard (3); 14:56 – Jean Beliveau (2)
Dave Creighton (2) – 10:51; Andy Bathgate (2) – 15:31		Second period	00:42 – Bernie Geoffrion (4); 14:23 – Bernie Geoffrion (5); 15:04 – Dickie Moore (1)
No scoring		Third period	10:55 – Jean Beliveau (3); 14:20 – Bernie Geoffrion (6); 19:14 – Dickie Moore (2)
Gump Worsley 38 saves / 46 shots		Goalie stats	Jacques Plante 19 saves / 22 shots

April 2	New York Rangers	1–3	Montreal Canadiens	Montreal Forum	Recap
Andy Hebenton (2) – 06:42		First period	No scoring
No scoring		Second period	No scoring
No scoring		Third period	09:22 – Bernie Geoffrion (7); 11:28 – Henri Richard (2); 13:08 – Phil Goyette (1)
Gump Worsley 37 saves / 40 shots		Goalie stats	Jacques Plante 30 saves / 31 shots

April 4	New York Rangers	3–4	OT	Montreal Canadiens	Montreal Forum	Recap
No scoring		First period		No scoring
No scoring		Second period		16:41 – pp – Jean Beliveau (4); 17:53 – sh – Floyd Curry (1); 19:40 – Jean Beliveau
Parker MacDonald (1) – 05:28; Red Sullivan (1) – 12:21; Harry Howell (1)		Third period		No scoring
No scoring		First overtime period		01:11 – Maurice Richard (4)
Gump Worsley 32 saves / 36 shots		Goalie stats		Jacques Plante 18 saves / 21 shots

Montreal won series 4–1

=== Stanley Cup Finals ===
April 6	Boston Bruins	1–5	Montreal Canadiens	Montreal Forum	Recap
No scoring		First period	No scoring
Fleming MacKell (2) – pp – 07:27		Second period	10:39 – Maurice Richard (5); 13:29 – pp – Maurice Richard (6); 15:35 – pp – Bernie Geoffrion (8); 17:00 – Maurice Richard (7)
No scoring		Third period	18:17 – Maurice Richard (8)
Don Simmons 34 saves / 39 shots		Goalie stats	Jacques Plante 22 saves / 23 shots

April 9	Boston Bruins	0–1	Montreal Canadiens	Montreal Forum	Recap
No scoring		First period	No scoring
No scoring		Second period	02:27 – Jean Beliveau (6)
No scoring		Third period	No scoring
Don Simmons 22 saves / 23 shots		Goalie stats	Jacques Plante 24 saves / 24 shots

April 11	Montreal Canadiens	4–2	Boston Bruins	Boston Garden	Recap
Bernie Geoffrion (9) – 01:30; Floyd Curry (2) – 14:39; Bernie Geoffrion (10) – pp – 19:54		First period	No scoring
No scoring		Second period	06:16 – Don McKenney (1)
Phil Goyette (2) – 07:31		Third period	19:16 – Fleming MacKell (3)
Jacques Plante 25 saves / 27 shots		Goalie stats	Don Simmons 21 saves / 25 shots

April 14	Montreal Canadiens	0–2	Boston Bruins	Boston Garden	Recap
No scoring		First period	02:56 – pp – Fleming MacKell (4)
No scoring		Second period	No scoring
No scoring		Third period	19:40 – en – Fleming MacKell (5)
Jacques Plante 27 saves / 28 shots		Goalie stats	Don Simmons 21 saves / 21 shots

April 16	Boston Bruins	1–5	Montreal Canadiens	Montreal Forum	Recap
No scoring		First period	18:11 – Andre Pronovost (1)
No scoring		Second period	00:14 – pp – Dickie Moore (3); 15:12 – Bernie Geoffrion (11)
Leo Labine (3) – 13:43		Third period	17:39 – Donnie Marshall (1); 18:31 – Floyd Curry (3)
Don Simmons 29 saves / 34 shots		Goalie stats	Jacques Plante 27 saves / 28 shots

Montreal won series 4–1

== Awards ==
Award winners
Prince of Wales Trophy: (Regular season champion)	Detroit Red Wings
Art Ross Trophy: (Top scorer)	Gordie Howe, Detroit Red Wings
Calder Memorial Trophy: (Best first-year player)	Larry Regan, Boston Bruins
Hart Trophy: (Most valuable player)	Gordie Howe, Detroit Red Wings
James Norris Memorial Trophy: (Best defenceman)	Doug Harvey, Montreal Canadiens
Lady Byng Memorial Trophy: (Excellence and sportsmanship)	Andy Hebenton, New York Rangers
Vezina Trophy: (Goaltender of team with the best goals-against average)	Jacques Plante, Montreal Canadiens

=== All-Star teams ===
First team	Position	Second team
Glenn Hall, Detroit Red Wings	G	Jacques Plante, Montreal Canadiens
Doug Harvey, Montreal Canadiens	D	Fern Flaman, Boston Bruins
Red Kelly, Detroit Red Wings	D	Bill Gadsby, New York Rangers
Jean Beliveau, Montreal Canadiens	C	Ed Litzenberger, Chicago Black Hawks
Gordie Howe, Detroit Red Wings	RW	Maurice Richard, Montreal Canadiens
Ted Lindsay, Detroit Red Wings	LW	Real Chevrefils, Boston Bruins

== Player statistics ==
=== Scoring leaders ===
Note: GP = Games played, G = Goals, A = Assists, Pts = Points, PIM = Penalties in minutes

Player	Team	GP	G	A	Pts	PIM
Gordie Howe	Detroit Red Wings	70	44	45	89	72
Ted Lindsay	Detroit Red Wings	70	30	55	85	103
Jean Beliveau	Montreal Canadiens	69	33	51	84	105
Andy Bathgate	New York Rangers	70	27	50	77	60
Ed Litzenberger	Chicago Black Hawks	70	32	32	64	48
Maurice Richard	Montreal Canadiens	63	33	29	62	74
Don McKenney	Boston Bruins	69	21	39	60	31
Dickie Moore	Montreal Canadiens	70	29	29	58	56
Henri Richard	Montreal Canadiens	63	18	36	54	71
Norm Ullman	Detroit Red Wings	64	16	36	52	47

=== Leading goaltenders ===
Note: GP = Games played; Min – Minutes played; GA = Goals against; GAA = Goals against average; W = Wins; L = Losses; T = Ties; SO = Shutouts

Player	Team	GP	MIN	GA	GAA	W	L	T	SO
Jacques Plante	Montreal Canadiens	61	3660	122	2.00	31	18	12	9
Glenn Hall	Detroit Red Wings	70	4200	156	2.23	38	20	12	4
Terry Sawchuk	Boston Bruins	34	2040	81	2.38	18	10	6	2
Don Simmons	Boston Bruins	26	1560	63	2.42	13	9	4	4
Ed Chadwick	Toronto Maple Leafs	70	4200	186	2.66	21	34	15	5
Al Rollins	Chicago Black Hawks	70	4080	222	3.17	16	39	15	3
Lorne Worsley	New York Rangers	68	4080	217	3.24	26	28	14	3

== Coaches ==
- Boston Bruins: Milt Schmidt
- Chicago Black Hawks: Tommy Ivan
- Detroit Red Wings: Jimmy Skinner
- Montreal Canadiens: Toe Blake
- New York Rangers: Phil Watson
- Toronto Maple Leafs: Howie Meeker

== Debuts ==
The following is a list of players of note who played their first NHL game in 1956–57 (listed with their first team, asterisk(*) marks debut in playoffs):

- Larry Regan, Boston Bruins
- Moose Vasko, Chicago Black Hawks
- Ralph Backstrom, Montreal Canadiens
- Phil Goyette, Montreal Canadiens
- Frank Mahovlich, Toronto Maple Leafs
- Bob Pulford, Toronto Maple Leafs
- Bob Baun, Toronto Maple Leafs

== Last games ==
The following is a list of players of note that played their last game in the NHL in 1956–57 (listed with their last team):

- Cal Gardner, Boston Bruins
- Harry Watson, Chicago Black Hawks
- Marty Pavelich, Detroit Red Wings
- Gerry McNeil, Montreal Canadiens
- Ted Kennedy, Toronto Maple Leafs

== Broadcasting ==
Hockey Night in Canada on CBC Television televised Saturday night regular season games and selected Stanley Cup playoff games. Games were not broadcast in their entirety until the 1968–69 season, and were typically joined in progress, while the radio version of HNIC aired games in their entirety.

In the U.S., CBS signed a four-year deal to televise Saturday afternoon games from January to March.

== See also ==
- 1956–57 NHL transactions
- 1956 NHL Intra-League Draft
- List of Stanley Cup champions
- National Hockey League All-Star Game
- 1956 in sports
- 1957 in sports
