= Chicago Blackhawks =

National Hockey League team in Chicago, Illinois

- 2026–27 Chicago Blackhawks season
- Conference: Western
- Division: Central
- Founded: 1926
- History: Chicago Black Hawks; 1926–1986; Chicago Blackhawks; 1986–present
- Home arena: United Center
- City: Chicago, Illinois
- Team colors: Red, white, black
- Media: Chicago Sports Network; WGN (720 AM)
- Owner(s): Wirtz Corporation; Danny Wirtz, chairman
- General manager: Kyle Davidson
- Head coach: Jeff Blashill
- Captain: Connor Bedard
- Minor league affiliates: Rockford IceHogs (AHL); Indy Fuel (ECHL)
- Stanley Cups: 6 (1933–34, 1937–38, 1960–61, 2009–10, 2012–13, 2014–15)
- Conference championships: 4 (1991–92, 2009–10, 2012–13, 2014–15)
- Presidents' Trophies: 2 (1990–91, 2012–13)
- Division championships: 16 (1969–70, 1970–71, 1971–72, 1972–73, 1975–76, 1977–78, 1978–79, 1979–80, 1982–83, 1985–86, 1989–90, 1990–91, 1992–93, 2009–10, 2012–13, 2016–17)
- Official website: nhl.com/blackhawks

The Chicago Blackhawks (spelled Black Hawks until 1986, and known colloquially as the Hawks) are a professional ice hockey team based in Chicago. The Blackhawks compete in the National Hockey League (NHL) as a member of the Central Division in the Western Conference. The Blackhawks have won six Stanley Cup championships since their founding in 1926. They are one of the "Original Six" NHL teams, along with the Detroit Red Wings, Montreal Canadiens, Toronto Maple Leafs, Boston Bruins, and New York Rangers. Since the 1994–95 season, the team has played its home games at the United Center, which they share with the National Basketball Association's Chicago Bulls; both teams previously played at the now-demolished Chicago Stadium.

The Blackhawks' original owner was Frederic McLaughlin, a "hands-on" owner who fired many coaches during his ownership and led the team to win two Stanley Cup titles in 1934 and 1938. After McLaughlin's death in 1944, the team came under the ownership of the Norris family, who acted as their landlord as owners of the Chicago Stadium, and also owned stakes in several of the NHL teams. At first, the Norris ownership was as part of a syndicate fronted by longtime executive Bill Tobin, and the team languished in favor of the Norris-owned Detroit Red Wings. After the senior James E. Norris died in 1952, the Norris assets were spread among family members, and James D. Norris became the owner of the Blackhawks. The younger Norris took an active interest in the team, which won another Stanley Cup title under his ownership in 1961. After James D. Norris died in 1966, the Wirtz family became owners of the franchise. In 2007, the team came under the control of Rocky Wirtz, who is credited with turning around the organization, which had lost fan interest and competitiveness; under Wirtz, the Blackhawks won the Stanley Cup three times, in 2010, 2013 and 2015. Rocky died in July 2023, and his son, Danny Wirtz, was named chairman of the Blackhawks.

== History ==
=== Founding ===
On May 15, 1926, the NHL owners met in Montreal and awarded an expansion franchise for Chicago to a syndicate headed by former football star Huntington Hardwick of Boston.

At the same meeting, Hardwick arranged the purchase of the players of the Portland Rosebuds of the Western Hockey League for $100,000 from WHL president Frank Patrick in a deal brokered by Boston Bruins' owner Charles Adams. However, only a month later, Hardwick's group sold out to Chicago coffee tycoon Frederic McLaughlin.

McLaughlin had been a commander with the 333rd Machine Gun Battalion of the 86th Infantry Division during World War I. This division was nicknamed the "Blackhawk Division" after Black Hawk, a Native American of the Sauk nation who was a prominent figure in the history of Illinois. McLaughlin named the new hockey team in honor of the military unit, making it one of many sports team names using Native Americans as icons. However, unlike the military division, the team's name was spelled in two words as "Black Hawks" until 1986, when the club officially became the "Blackhawks", based on the spelling found in the original franchise documents.

The Black Hawks began play in the 1926–27 season, along with its fellow expansion franchises, the Detroit Cougars (now the Detroit Red Wings) and New York Rangers. The team had to face immediate competition in Chicago from Eddie Livingstone's rival, the Chicago Cardinals, who played in the same building. McLaughlin took a very active role in running the team despite having no background in the sport. He hired Bill Tobin, a former goaltender who had played in the Western League, as his assistant, but directed the team himself. He was also very interested in promoting American players, then very rare in professional hockey. Several of them, including Doc Romnes, Taffy Abel, Alex Levinsky, Mike Karakas, and Cully Dahlstrom, become staples with the team, and under McLaughlin, the Black Hawks were the first NHL team with an all-American-born lineup.

=== McLaughlin era (1926–1944) ===
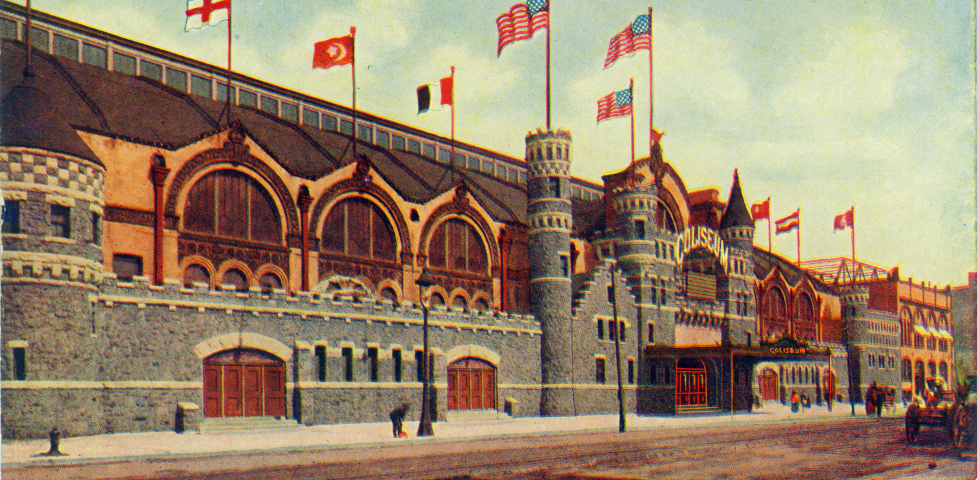
The Chicago Coliseum (pictured in a 1910 postcard), the Black Hawks' home arena from 1926 to 1929

The Black Hawks played their first game on November 17, 1926, against the Toronto St. Patricks at the Chicago Coliseum. They won their first game 4–1, in front of a crowd of over 7,000. The Hawks' first season was a moderate success, as they finished the season in third place with a record of 19–22–3. However, they lost the 1927 first-round playoff series to the Boston Bruins.

Following the series, McLaughlin fired head coach Pete Muldoon. According to Jim Coleman, sportswriter for the Toronto-based Globe and Mail, McLaughlin felt that the Hawks were good enough to finish first. Muldoon disagreed, and in a fit of pique, McLaughlin fired him. According to Coleman, Muldoon responded by yelling, "Fire me, Major, and you'll never finish first. I'll put a curse on this team that will hoodoo it until the end of time." The Curse of Muldoon was born – although Coleman admitted years after the fact that he had fabricated the whole incident – and became one of the first widely known sports "curses." While the team would go on to win three Stanley Cups in its first 39 years of existence, it did so without ever having finished in first place, either in a single- or multi-division format. The Black Hawks proceeded to have the worst record in the league in 1927–28, winning only seven of 44 games.

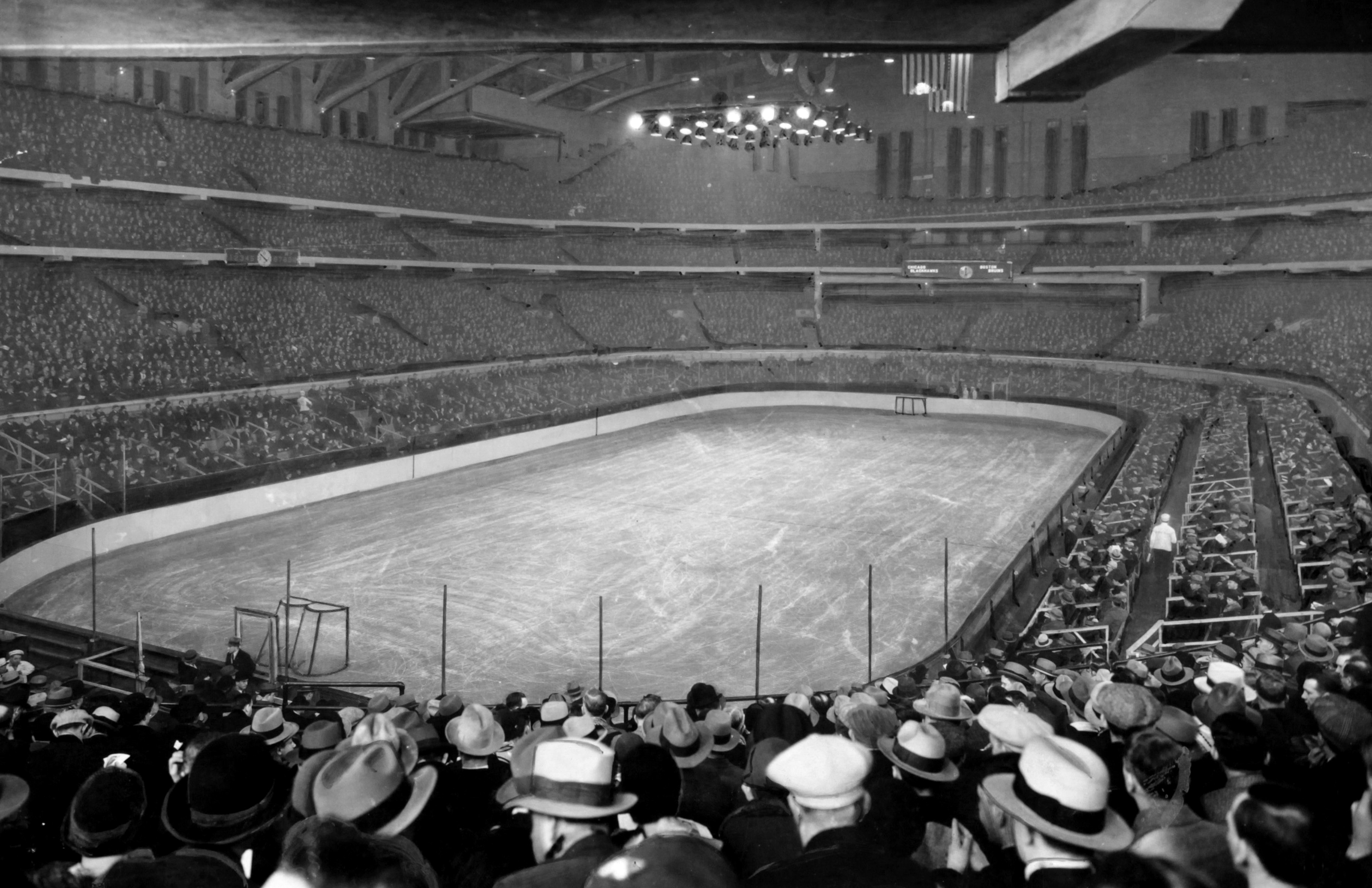
Interior of Chicago Stadium in February 1930, prior to a game between the Hawks and the Boston Bruins; the Black Hawks moved into the arena during the 1929–30 season.

For the 1928–29 season, the Black Hawks were originally slated to play in the newly built Chicago Stadium, but due to construction delays and a dispute between McLaughlin and arena president Paddy Harmon, they instead divided their time between the Coliseum, the Detroit Olympia, and the Peace Bridge Arena in Fort Erie, Ontario, before moving to Chicago Stadium the following season.

By 1930–31, with goal-scorer Johnny Gottselig, Cy Wentworth on defense, and Charlie Gardiner in goal, the Hawks reached their first Stanley Cup Final, but lost in the final two games against the Montreal Canadiens. They had another stellar season in 1931–32, but that did not translate into playoff success. However, two years later, Gardiner led his team to victory by shutting out the Detroit Red Wings in the final game of the Stanley Cup Final; Mush March scored the winning goal in double-overtime as the Hawks beat Detroit 1–0.

In 1937–38, the Black Hawks had a record of 14–25–9, almost missing the playoffs. They stunned the Canadiens and New York Americans on overtime goals in the deciding games of both semi-final series, advancing to the 1938 Stanley Cup Final against the Toronto Maple Leafs. Black Hawks goaltender Mike Karakas was injured and could not play, forcing a desperate Chicago team to pull minor-leaguer Alfie Moore out of a Toronto bar and onto the ice. Moore played one game and won it. Toronto refused to let Moore play the next, so Chicago used Paul Goodman in game 2 and lost. However, for the third and fourth games, Karakas was fitted with a special skate to protect his injured toe, and the team won both games. It was too late for Toronto, as the Hawks won their second championship. As of 2025, the 1937–38 Black Hawks possess the poorest regular season record of any Stanley Cup champion.

The Black Hawks next returned to the Stanley Cup Final in 1944 behind Doug Bentley's 38 goals, with Bentley's linemate Clint Smith leading the team in assists. After upsetting the Red Wings in the semifinals, they were promptly dispatched by the dominant Canadiens in four games.

=== Norris era (1944–1966) ===
After McLaughlin died in December 1944, his estate sold the team to a syndicate headed by longtime team president Bill Tobin. However, Tobin was only a puppet for James E. Norris, who owned the rival Red Wings. Norris had also been the Black Hawks' landlord since his 1936 purchase of the Chicago Stadium. For the next eight years, the Norris-Tobin ownership, as a rule, paid almost no attention to the Black Hawks. Nearly every trade made between Detroit and Chicago ended up being Red Wing heists. As a result, for the next several years, the Black Hawks were the model of futility in the NHL. Between 1945 and 1958, they only made the playoffs twice.

In 1950, Norris' eldest son, James D. Norris, and Red Wings minority owner Arthur Wirtz (the senior Norris' original partner in buying the Red Wings 23 years earlier) took over the floundering club. They guided it through financial reversals, and rebuilt the team from there. One of their first moves was to hire former Detroit coach and general manager Tommy Ivan as general manager.

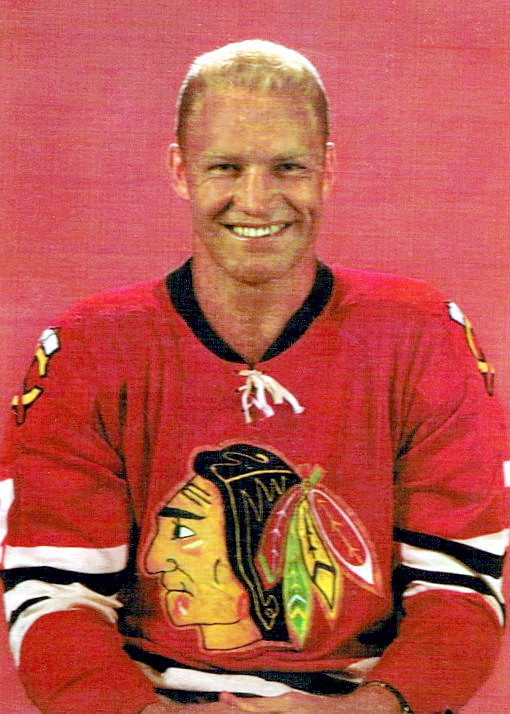
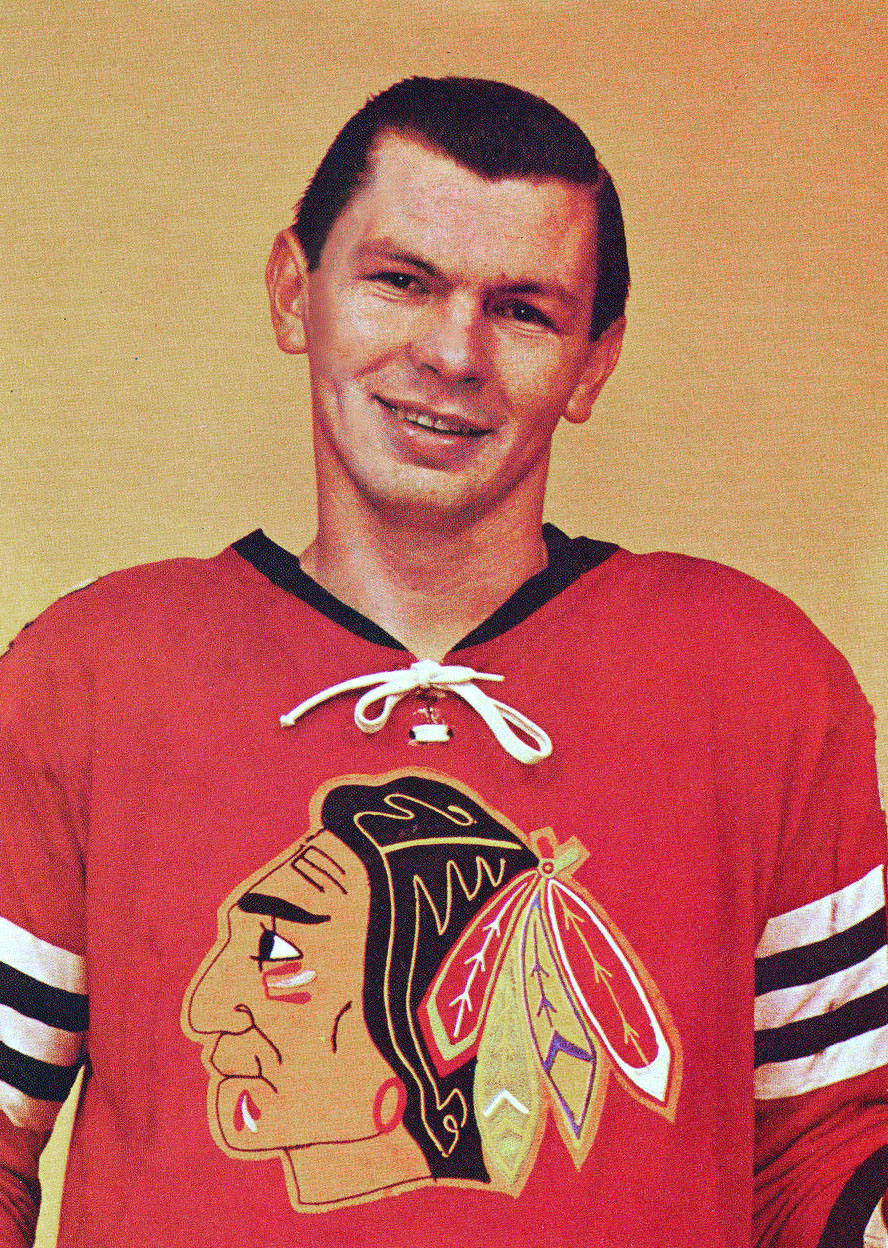
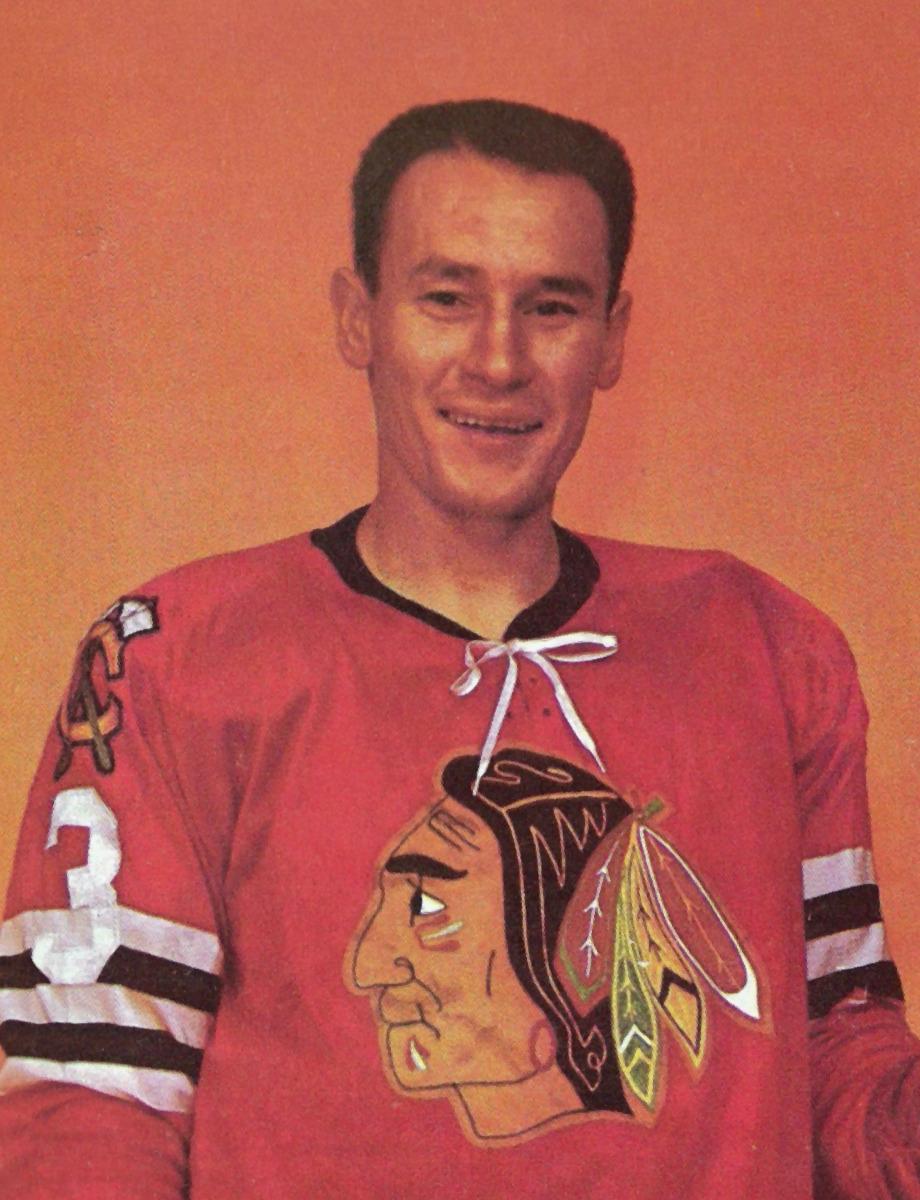
Signed as prospects in the late-1950s, Bobby Hull (left), Stan Mikita (center), and Pierre Pilote (right), eventually rose to become preeminent stars in Chicago.

In the late 1950s, the Hawks struck gold, acquiring three young prospects (forwards Bobby Hull and Stan Mikita and defenseman Pierre Pilote), and obtaining both star goaltender Glenn Hall and veteran forward Ted Lindsay (who had just had a career season with 30 goals and 55 assists) from Detroit. Hull, Mikita, Pilote, and Hall became preeminent stars of the team, and all four would eventually be inducted into the Hockey Hall of Fame.

After two first-round exits at the hands of the eventual champions from Montreal in 1959 and 1960, it was expected the Canadiens would once again defeat the Hawks when they met in the semifinals in 1961. A defensive plan that completely wore down Montreal's superstars worked, however, as Chicago won the series in six games. They then bested the Wings to win their third Stanley Cup championship.

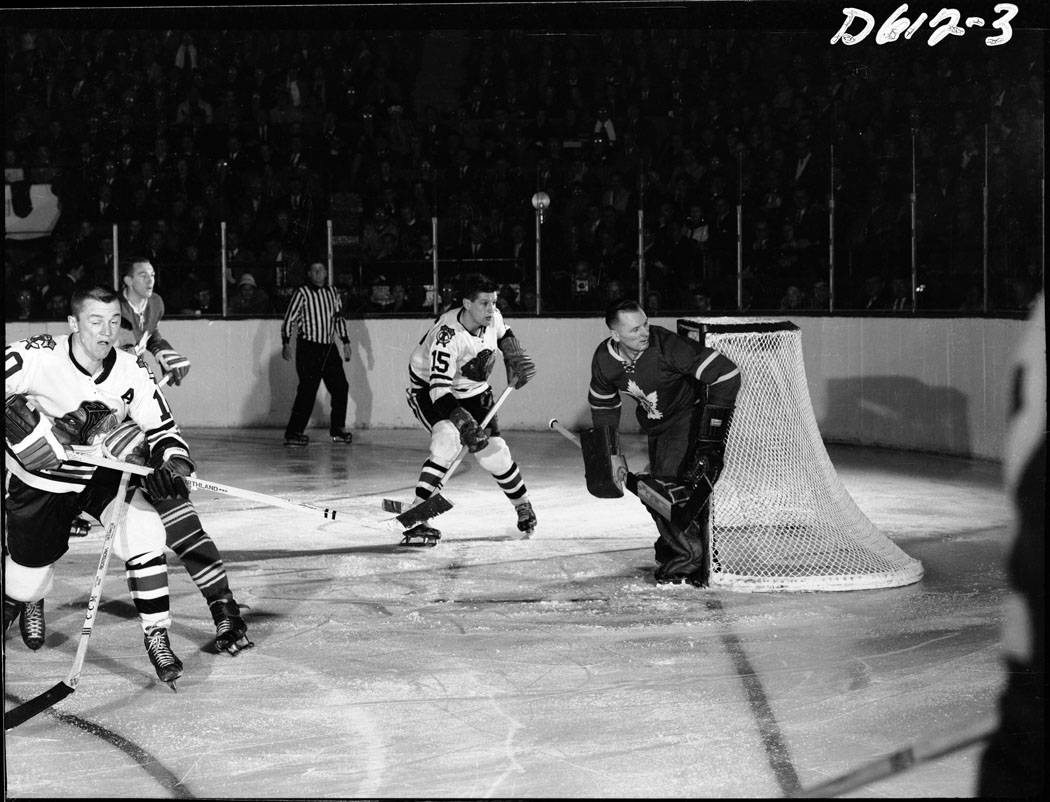
Ron Murphy and Eric Nesterenko battle in front of the Toronto net

The Hawks made the Cup Final twice more in the 1960s, losing to the Leafs in 1962 and the Canadiens in 1965. They remained a force to be reckoned with throughout the decade, with Hull enjoying four 50-goal seasons, Mikita winning back-to-back scoring titles and MVP accolades, Pilote winning three consecutive Norris Trophies, and Hall being named the First or Second All-Star goaltender eight out of nine seasons. Hull and Mikita especially were widely regarded as the most feared one-two punch in the league. However, despite a strong supporting cast which included Bill Hay, Ken Wharram, Phil Esposito, Moose Vasko, Doug Mohns, and Pat Stapleton, the Hawks never quite put it all together.

In 1966–67, the last season of the six-team NHL, the Black Hawks finished first, breaking the supposed "Curse of Muldoon", 23 years after the death of Frederic McLaughlin. However, they lost in the semifinals to Toronto, who went on to win their last Stanley Cup of the era. Afterward, Coleman, who first printed the story of the curse in 1943, admitted that he made the story up to break a writer's block he had as a column deadline approached.

=== Arthur Wirtz era (1966–1983) ===
Before his death in 1966, one of James D. Norris' last moves in the NHL was to arrange an expansion franchise in St. Louis, where he owned the St. Louis Arena. Tobin died in 1963, a vice president of the team until his death. Ownership now passed to Norris' longtime partner Arthur Wirtz and his son Bill Wirtz. The Wirtz–Norris partnership dated over three decades; Arthur Wirtz had been a minority partner in the syndicate the senior Norris put together to buy the Red Wings in 1932.

Goaltender Glenn Hall was drafted by the St. Louis Blues expansion team for the 1967–68 season, while Pierre Pilote was traded to the Toronto Maple Leafs in exchange for Jim Pappin in 1968. In the 1968–69 season, despite Bobby Hull breaking his own previous record of 54 goals in a season with 58, the Black Hawks missed the playoffs for the first time since 1958, and the last time before 1997–98.

In 1967, the Black Hawks made a trade with the Boston Bruins that turned out to be one of the most one-sided in the history of the sport. Chicago sent young forwards Phil Esposito, Ken Hodge and Fred Stanfield to Boston in exchange for Pit Martin, Jack Norris and Gilles Marotte. While Martin would star for the Hawks for many seasons, Esposito, Hodge and Stanfield would lead the Bruins to the top of the NHL for several years and capture two Stanley Cups. In Boston, Esposito set numerous scoring records en route to a career as one of the NHL's all-time greats.

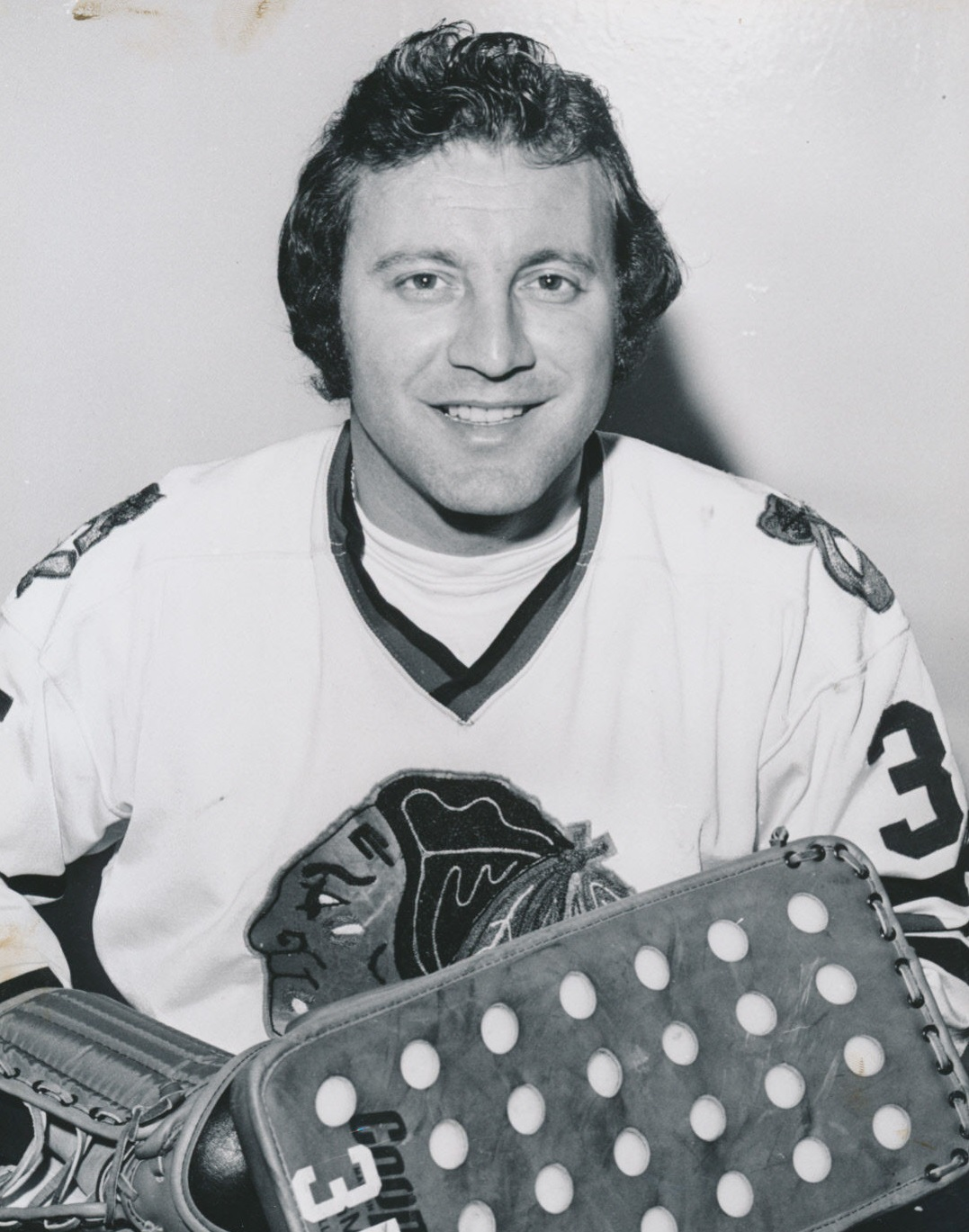
Goaltender Tony Esposito tallied a franchise-high 418 wins between 1969 and 1983.

Nonetheless, in the 1970–71 season, life was made easier for the Black Hawks, as in an attempt to better balance the divisions, the expansion Buffalo Sabres and Vancouver Canucks were both placed in the East Division while the Hawks moved into the West Division. The Hawks became the class of the West overnight, rampaging to a 46–17–15 record and an easy first-place finish. With second-year goaltender Tony Esposito (Phil's younger brother and winner of the Calder Memorial Trophy for Rookie of the Year the previous season), Hull, his younger brother Dennis, Mikita, and defensemen Stapleton, Keith Magnuson and Bill White, the Hawks reached the Stanley Cup Final, losing to the Canadiens.

A critical blow to the franchise came in 1972–73 with the start of the World Hockey Association (WHA). Long dissatisfied with how little he was paid as the NHL's marquee star, Hull jumped to the upstart Winnipeg Jets for a million-dollar contract. Former Philadelphia Flyers star André Lacroix joined him, having received very little ice time during his single season with Chicago, and the pair became two of the WHA's great stars. However, the Black Hawks repeated their appearance in the Stanley Cup Final that year, again losing to Montreal. Stapleton also left for the WHA after that year, depleting the team further.

While the team led or was second in the West Division for four straight seasons, for the rest of the 1970s, the Black Hawks made the playoffs each year—winning seven division championships in the decade in all—but were never a successful Stanley Cup contender, losing 16-straight playoff games at one point. The team acquired legendary blueliner Bobby Orr from the Boston Bruins in 1976, but ill health forced him to sit out for most of the season, and he eventually retired in 1979, having played only 26 games for the Hawks. Stan Mikita did the same the following year after playing for Chicago for 22 years, the third-longest career for a single team in league history.

By 1982, the Black Hawks squeaked into the playoffs as the fourth seed in the Norris Division (at the time the top four teams in each division automatically made the playoffs), and were one of the NHL's Cinderella teams that year. Led by second-year Denis Savard's 32 goals and 119 points and Doug Wilson's 39 goals, the Hawks stunned the Minnesota North Stars and St. Louis Blues in the playoffs before losing to another surprise team, the Vancouver Canucks, who made the Stanley Cup Final. Chicago proved they were no fluke the next season, also making the third round before losing to the eventual runner-up Edmonton Oilers. After an off-year in 1984, the Hawks again faced a now fresh-off-a-ring Edmonton offensive juggernaut of a team and lost in the third round in 1985.

=== Bill Wirtz era (1983–2007) ===
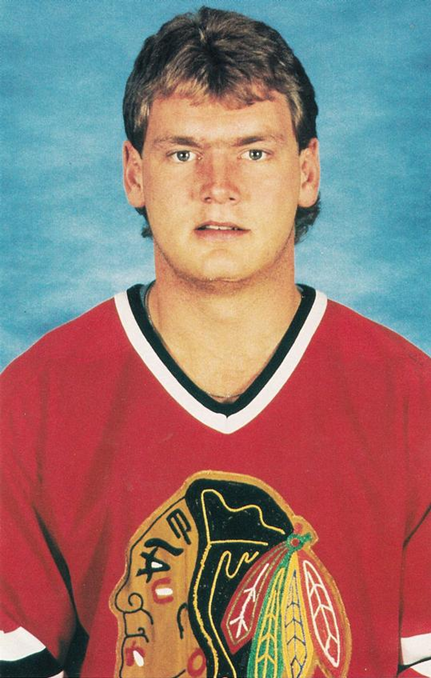
Steve Larmer played 884 consecutive games for the Blackhawks from 1982 to 1993, the most consecutive games played for one franchise in NHL history.

In 1983, Arthur Wirtz died and the club came under the sole control of his son Bill Wirtz. Although the Black Hawks continued to make the playoffs each season, the club began a slow decline, punctuated with an appearance in the 1992 Stanley Cup Final.

During the 1985 playoff series against Edmonton, the Black Hawks and their fans started a tradition of cheering during the singing of "The Star-Spangled Banner".

Prior to the 1985–86 season, the team's original NHL contract was found to have their name printed as a compound word ("Blackhawks") as opposed to two separate words ("Black Hawks"). Official sources, including team and league records, had been using the latter for 60 years; the two-word moniker was also embraced by the public and media without question, especially since it lent itself to the shorthand "Hawks" as a nickname. The team began transitioning to "Chicago Blackhawks" during the season before the league officially followed suit ahead of the 1986–87 campaign.

In the late 1980s, Chicago still made the playoffs on an annual basis but made early-round exits each time. In 1988–89, after three-straight first-round defeats and despite a fourth-place finish in their division in the regular season, Chicago made it to the conference finals in the rookie seasons of both goaltender Ed Belfour and center Jeremy Roenick. However, they failed to make the 1989 Stanley Cup Final, losing to the eventual champions, the Calgary Flames.

The following season, the Hawks did prove they were late-round playoff material, running away with the Norris Division title, but, yet again, the third round continued to stymie them, this time against the eventual champion Oilers, despite 1970s Soviet star goaltender Vladislav Tretiak coming to Chicago to become the Blackhawks' goaltender coach.

In 1990–91, Chicago was poised to fare even better in the playoffs, winning the Presidents' Trophy for best regular season record, but the Minnesota North Stars stunned them in six games in the first round en route to an improbable Stanley Cup Final appearance. In 1991–92, the Blackhawks – with Roenick scoring 53 goals, Steve Larmer scoring 29 goals, Chris Chelios (acquired from Montreal two years earlier) on defense, and Belfour in goal – finally reached the Stanley Cup Final after 19 years out of such status, winning 11 consecutive playoff games that year, setting an NHL record in the process. However, they were swept four games to none by the Mario Lemieux-led defending Stanley Cup champion, the Pittsburgh Penguins. In sweeping the Blackhawks, the Penguins tied the record Chicago had set only days before. Although the 4–0 sweep indicated Pittsburgh's dominance in games won, the individual games were contested closely. Game 1 saw the Blackhawks squander leads of 3–0 and 4–1, and would eventually be beaten 5–4 after a Lemieux power-play goal with nine seconds remaining in regulation. The Blackhawks' most lackluster match was game two, losing 3–1. A frustrating loss of 1–0 followed in game three, and a natural hat trick from Dirk Graham and stellar play from Dominik Hašek (who showed indications of the goaltender he would later become) could not secure a win in game 4, which ended in a 6–5 final in favor of Pittsburgh. The defending NBA champion Chicago Bulls were in their finals in 1992, but won their championship in six. This was the only year the city of Chicago would host the NBA and NHL finals concurrently in the same year; Blackhawks head coach Mike Keenan would see this again in New York, when he coached the Rangers to their first Stanley Cup in 54 years in 1994.

Belfour posted a 40-win season in 1992–93 as the Hawks looked to go deep yet again, and Chris Chelios accumulated career-high penalty time with 282 minutes in the box, but St. Louis stunned Chicago with a first-round sweep to continue Chicago's playoff losing streak.

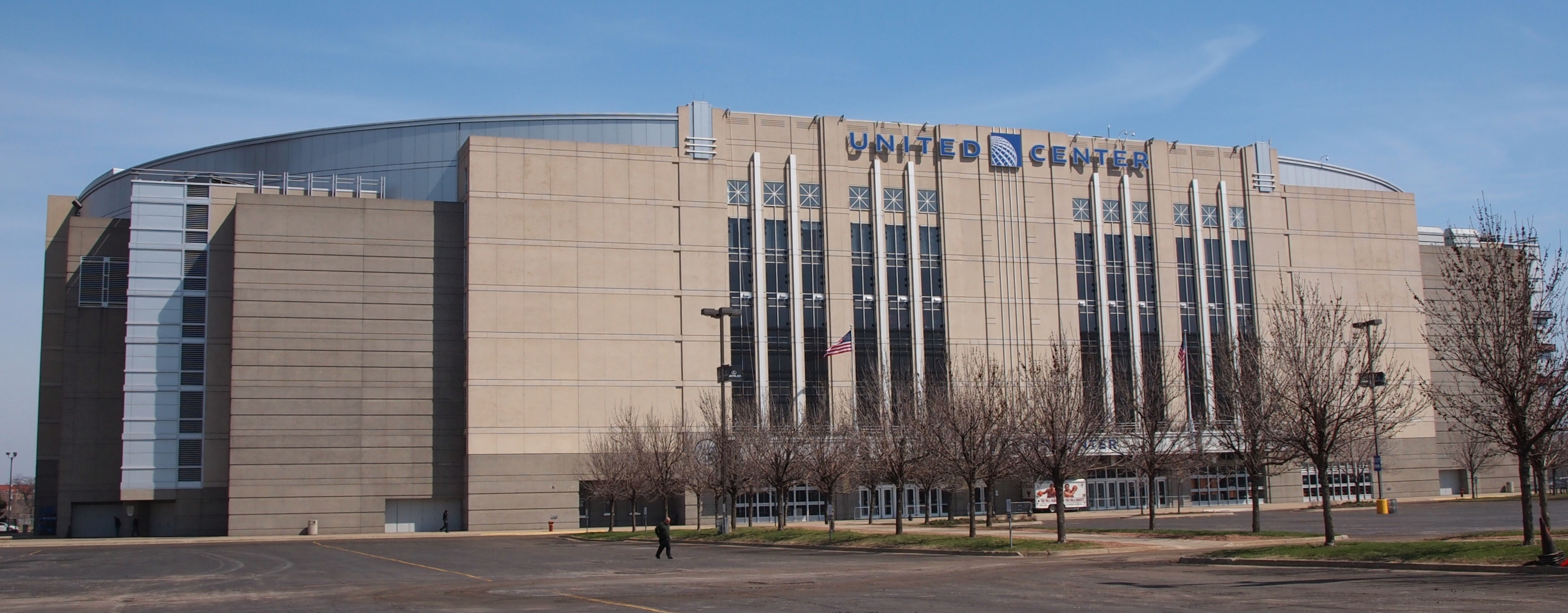
The Blackhawks moved to the United Center (pictured in April 2014) in the middle of the 1994–95 season.

Although they finished near .500 in 1993–94, the Blackhawks again qualified for the playoffs. They were eliminated by eventual Western Conference finalist Toronto, but broke their playoff losing streak at 10 games with a game three win. It was not enough, however, and the Blackhawks fell in six games. The 1993–94 season was also the Blackhawks' last at the Chicago Stadium, as the team moved into the newly built United Center across the street for the lockout-shortened 1994–95 season. Bernie Nicholls and Joe Murphy both scored 20 goals over 48 games, and Chicago once again made it to the conference finals, losing to the rival Detroit Red Wings. Also in 1994, management fired Wayne Messmer, popular singer of "The Star-Spangled Banner".

Jeremy Roenick, Ed Belfour and Chris Chelios were all traded away as the Blackhawks faltered through the late 1990s, until they missed the playoffs by five points in 1997–98 for the first time in 29 years, one season short of tying the Boston Bruins' record for the longest such streak in North American professional sport history. Chicago would also miss the playoffs for the second consecutive season in 1998–99, and missed the playoffs again in 1999–2000 and 2000–01 seasons.

The new millennium started with disappointment for the Blackhawks. Éric Dazé, Alexei Zhamnov and Tony Amonte emerged as some of the team's leading stars by this time. However, aside from a quick first-round exit in 2002 (where they lost to the St. Louis Blues in five games after winning game 1 of the series), the Blackhawks were consistently out of the playoffs from the 1997–98 season until the 2008–09 season, in most years finishing well out of contention, despite finishing in third place in the Central Division six times. Amonte left for the Phoenix Coyotes in the summer of 2002. During the 2002–03 season, the Blackhawks finished third in the Central Division with 79 points, but would finish ninth in the Western Conference, which would make them miss the playoffs by 13 points.

A somber note was struck in February 2004, when ESPN named the Blackhawks the worst franchise in professional sports. Indeed, the Blackhawks were viewed with much indifference by Chicagoans for much of the 1990s and early 2000s due to anger over several policies instituted by then-owner Bill Wirtz, who was derisively known as "Dollar Bill". For example, Wirtz did not allow home games to be televised in the Chicago area, claiming it was unfair to the team's season ticket holders. He also raised ticket prices to an average of $50, making them among the most expensive in the NHL. The Chicago Wolves, an American Hockey League (AHL) team based in Rosemont, Illinois, mocked the Blackhawks' struggle by using the marketing slogan, "We Play Hockey the Old-Fashioned Way: We Actually Win."

Following the lockout of the 2004–05 season, new general manager Dale Tallon set about restructuring the team in the hopes of making a playoff run. Tallon made several moves in the summer of 2005, most notably the signing of the Tampa Bay Lightning's Stanley Cup-winning goaltender Nikolai Khabibulin and All-Star defenseman Adrian Aucoin. However, injuries plagued Khabibulin and Aucoin among others, and the Blackhawks again finished well out of the playoffs with a 26–43–13 record, next-to-last in the Western Conference and second-worst in the NHL. The Blackhawks reached another low point on May 16, 2006, when they announced that popular TV/radio play-by-play announcer Pat Foley would not be brought back after 25 years with the team, a move unpopular amongst most fans; Foley then became the television/radio voice for the Chicago Wolves.

With the third overall pick in the 2006 NHL entry draft, the team selected Jonathan Toews, who led the University of North Dakota's Fighting Sioux team to the 2006 Frozen Four. The Blackhawks were eager to make a splash in the free agent market, and offered big money to many of the top free agents. However, they were denied, only being able to acquire two backup goaltenders in Patrick Lalime and Sébastien Caron. Chicago was one of the biggest buyers in the trade market, acquiring a future franchise player in Martin Havlát, as well as Bryan Smolinski from the Ottawa Senators in a three-way trade that also involved the San Jose Sharks. The Hawks dealt forward Mark Bell to the Sharks, Michal Barinka and a 2008 second-round draft pick to the Senators, while Ottawa also received defenseman Tom Preissing and center Josh Hennessy from San Jose. Havlát gave the Blackhawks the talented first-line caliber game breaker they desperately needed. The Havlát trade was soon followed by another major trade: winger and key Blackhawk player Kyle Calder was traded to the Philadelphia Flyers in exchange for grinding defensive center Michal Handzuš. The move caused a stir in Chicago, as Calder had won an increase in his contract through arbitration, which was accepted by the Hawks, but rather than ink their leading scorer, the team decided to address their need for a proven center by acquiring Handzuš. Injuries to both Havlát and Handzuš hurt the Blackhawks, and Smolinski was eventually traded at the trade deadline to the Vancouver Canucks. On November 26, 2006, Blackhawks general manager Dale Tallon fired head coach Trent Yawney and appointed assistant coach Denis Savard as the head coach. Savard had been the assistant coach of the team since 1997, a year after he retired as one of the most popular and successful Blackhawks players of all time. The Blackhawks continued to struggle, and finished last in the Central Division, 12 points out of the playoffs. They finished with the fourth-worst record in the NHL, and in the draft lottery, won the opportunity to select first overall in the draft. The team had never had a draft pick higher than third overall before, and used the pick to draft right wing Patrick Kane from the London Knights of the Ontario Hockey League (OHL).

=== Rocky Wirtz era (2007–2023) ===
==== 2007–2009: Rebuilding ====
On September 26, 2007, longtime Blackhawks owner Bill Wirtz died after a brief battle with cancer. He was succeeded by his son Rocky, who drastically altered his father's long-standing policies.

Midway into the 2007–08 season, the franchise experimented with a partnership with Comcast SportsNet Chicago and WGN-TV by airing selected Blackhawks home games on television. During the next season, Comcast and WGN began airing all of the team's regular season games. Rocky also named John McDonough, former president of Major League Baseball's Chicago Cubs, as the Blackhawks' new president. After taking over the position, McDonough was an instrumental figure in the Blackhawks' current marketing success. Wirtz was also able to bring back former Blackhawks greats Tony Esposito, Stan Mikita and Bobby Hull as the franchise's "hockey ambassadors".

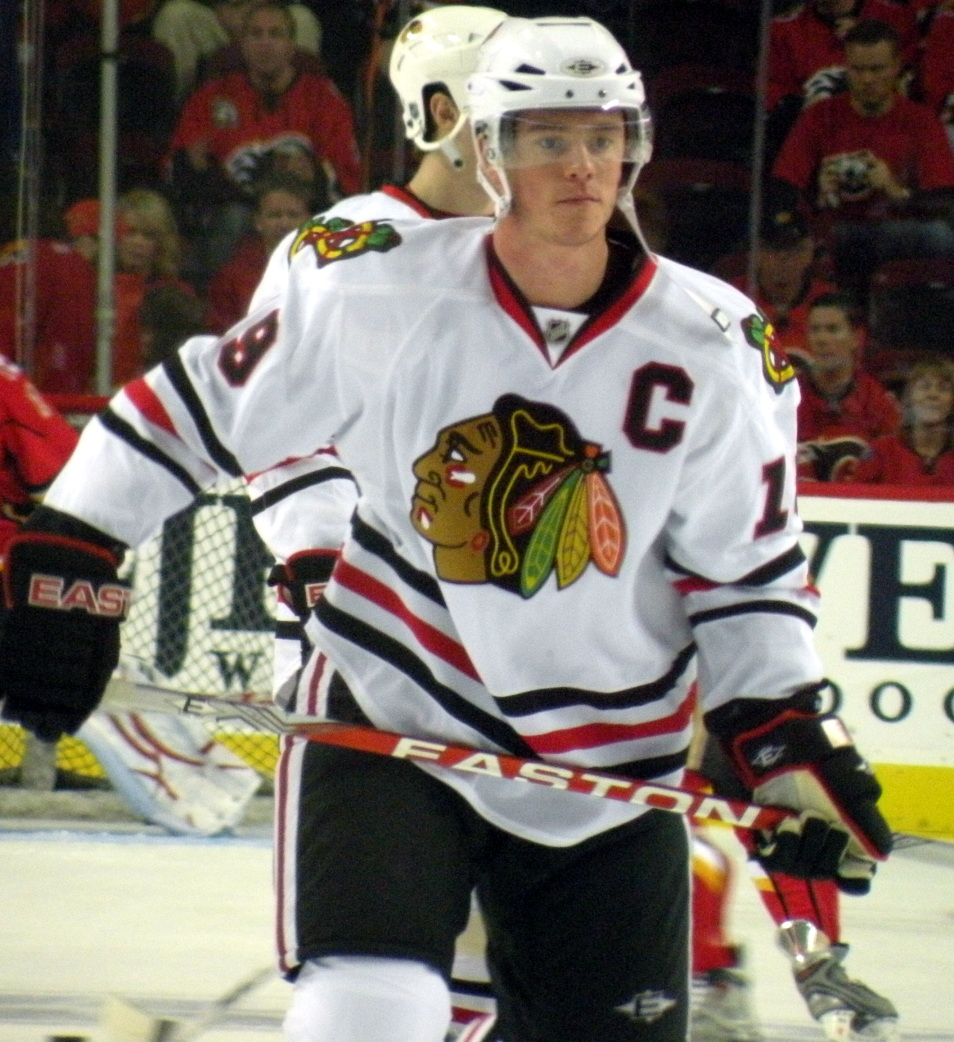
Jonathan Toews (pictured in 2009), named captain before the season started, became the youngest player to captain the Hawks at age 20.

In addition to the changes in the team's policies and front office, the younger Wirtz also made a concerted effort to rebuild the team. The Blackhawks roster was bolstered by the addition of Patrick Kane, the first overall selection in the 2007 NHL entry draft, who led all rookies in points. Kane and Jonathan Toews were finalists for the Calder Memorial Trophy, awarded to the NHL's best rookie. Kane ultimately beat his teammate for the award. Kane finished the 2007–08 season with 21 goals and 51 assists in 82 games. The Blackhawks finished with a record of 40–34–8, missing the playoffs by three points. The 2007–08 season marked the first time in six years that the team finished above .500.

Prior to the 2008–09 season opener, the Blackhawks named 20-year-old Toews as the new captain, succeeding Adrian Aucoin (who was traded to the Calgary Flames, after the 2006–07 season) and making him the third-youngest captain at the time of appointment. In addition to a new captain, the Blackhawks made several major roster changes before the season, trading Tuomo Ruutu, their longest-tenured player, to the Carolina Hurricanes in exchange for forward Andrew Ladd on February 26, 2008. Later that day, the Blackhawks traded captain Martin Lapointe to the Ottawa Senators in exchange for a sixth-round draft pick in the 2008 NHL entry draft. On July 1, the first day of free agency, the team signed goaltender Cristobal Huet to a four-year, US$22.5 million contract, and later signed defenseman Brian Campbell to an eight-year, $56.8 million contract. They also added former coaches Joel Quenneville and Scotty Bowman to their organization.

On February 13, 2008, the Blackhawks announced they would hold their first fan convention. On July 16, 2008, the team announced that they would host the 2009 Winter Classic on a temporary ice rink at the Chicago Cubs' home park Wrigley Field on New Year's Day against fellow "Original Six" members, the Detroit Red Wings; the Red Wings defeated Chicago 6–4. On June 16, Pat Foley returned as the Blackhawks' TV play-by-play man, replacing Dan Kelly; Foley called Blackhawks games from 1981 to 2006, and spent the next two years broadcasting for the AHL's Chicago Wolves. Foley was partnered with Ed Olczyk to broadcast all of the Blackhawks' games. On October 16, 2008, the Blackhawks relieved Denis Savard of his head coaching duties and replaced him with Joel Quenneville. Savard has since been brought back to the organization as an ambassador.

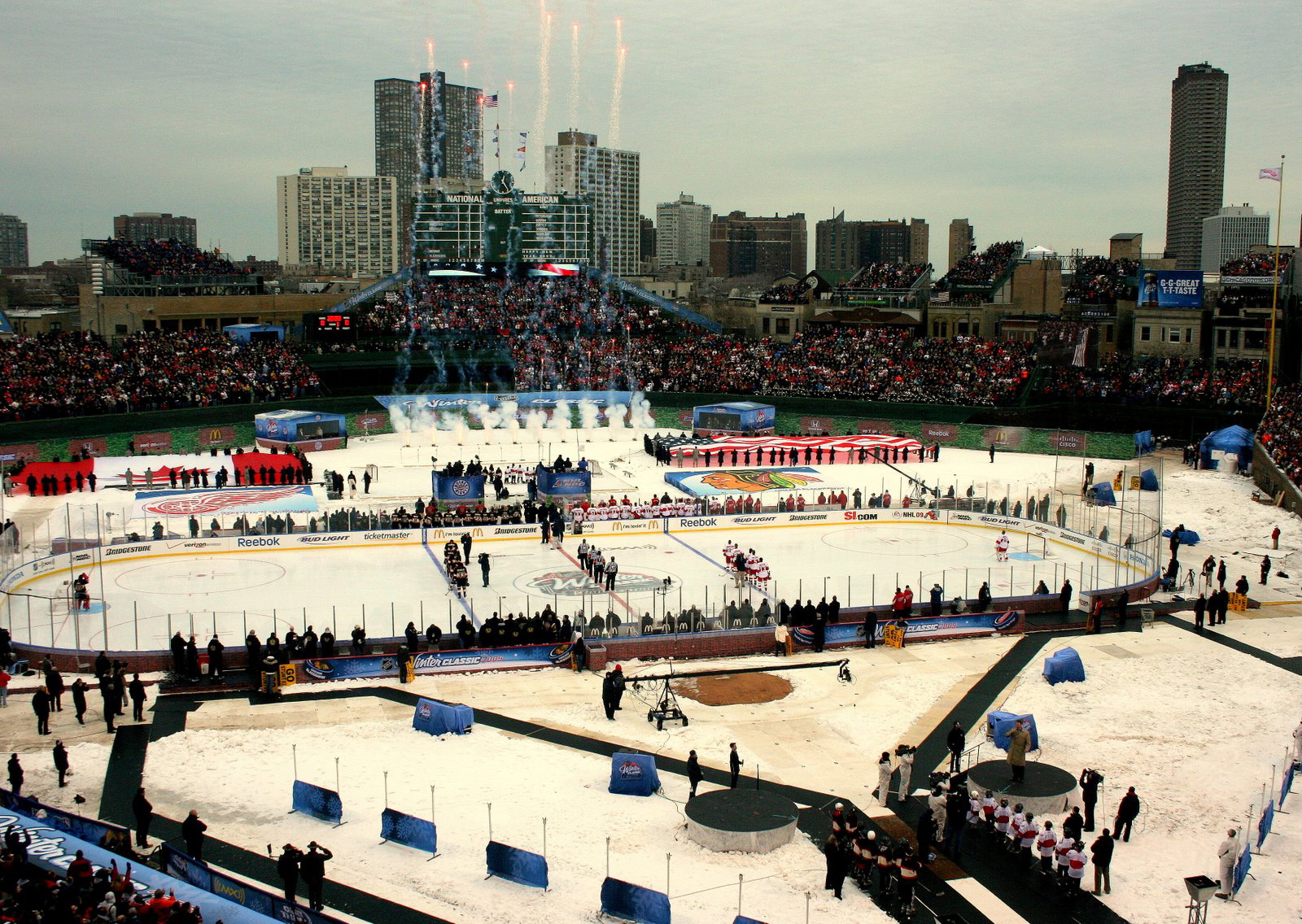
The Blackhawks hosted the Detroit Red Wings at the 2009 Winter Classic at Wrigley Field.

The Blackhawks finished the 2008–09 regular season in second place in their division with a record of 46–24–12, putting them in fourth place in the Western Conference with 104 points. The Blackhawks clinched a playoff berth for the first time since the 2001–02 season with a 3–1 win over the Nashville Predators on April 3. On April 8, with a shootout loss to the Columbus Blue Jackets, the Blackhawks clinched their first 100-point season in 17 years. The Blackhawks defeated the fifth-seeded Calgary Flames in six games to advance to the conference semifinals for the first time since 1996. The team proceeded to defeat the third-seeded Vancouver Canucks in six games, and then played the then-Stanley Cup champion, the Detroit Red Wings, for the Western Conference Championship, losing the series in five games.

During the 2008–09 season, the team led the NHL in home attendance, with a total of 912,155 spectators, averaging 22,247 per game. This figure includes the 40,818 fans from the Winter Classic at Wrigley Field. Therefore, the total attendance for games hosted at the United Center is 871,337, good for an average of 21,783, which still led the NHL over Montreal's 21,273 average. The Blackhawks welcomed their one millionth fan of the season at the United Center before game 6 of the conference semifinals on May 11, 2009.

==== 2009–2010: The Stanley Cup returns to Chicago ====
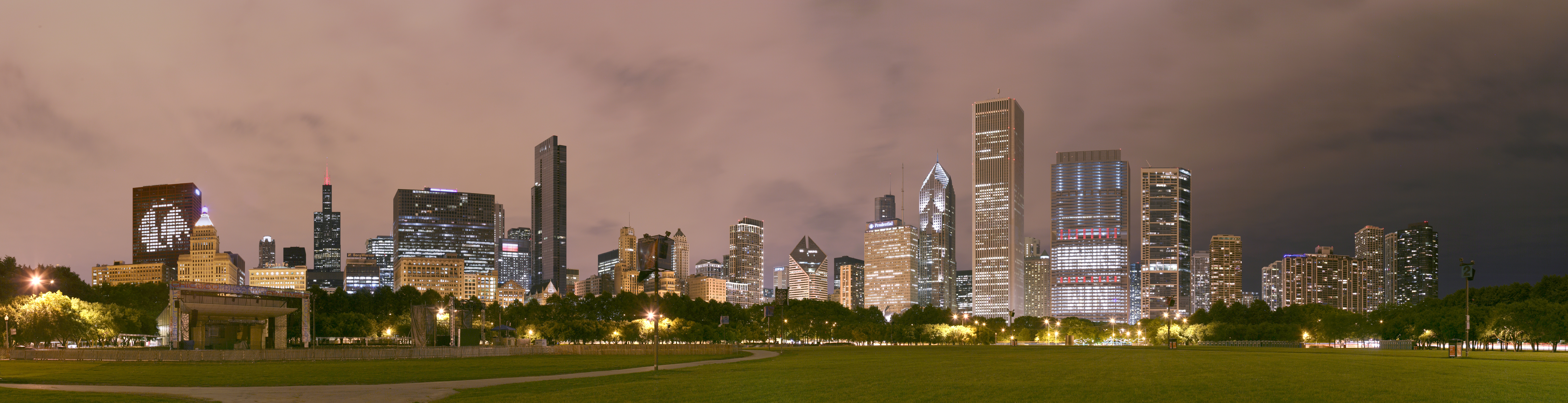
Chicago skyline with the CNA Center showing the Blackhawks logo, the Smurfit-Stone Building reading "Go Hawks", and the Blue Cross Blue Shield Tower reading "Hawks win" the night after the 2009–10 Chicago Blackhawks won the 2010 Stanley Cup Final, viewed from the Petrillo Music Shell lawn in Grant Park.

Prior to the 2009–10 season, the Blackhawks made another major free agent purchase, signing Marián Hossa to a 12-year, US$62.8 million contract. The team also acquired Tomáš Kopecký, John Madden and Richard Petiot. In early July, general manager Dale Tallon and the Blackhawks management came under fire when the National Hockey League Players' Association (NHLPA) claimed that the team did not submit offers to their restricted free agents before the deadline. In the worst-case scenario, the team's unsigned restricted free agents at the time, including Calder Memorial Trophy finalist Kris Versteeg, would have become unrestricted free agents. Despite the ordeal, the Blackhawks were able to sign Versteeg and all of their restricted free agents before the NHLPA could take further action. On July 14, 2009, the Blackhawks demoted Dale Tallon to the position of senior adviser. Stan Bowman, son of Scotty Bowman, was promoted to general manager. The Blackhawks continued to sell-out games, with the best average attendance of 21,356 over the Montreal Canadiens' 21,273 in the NHL, and had a total of 854,267, excluding the playoffs. The Blackhawks reached the one million mark in game 3 of the conference finals against the San Jose Sharks.

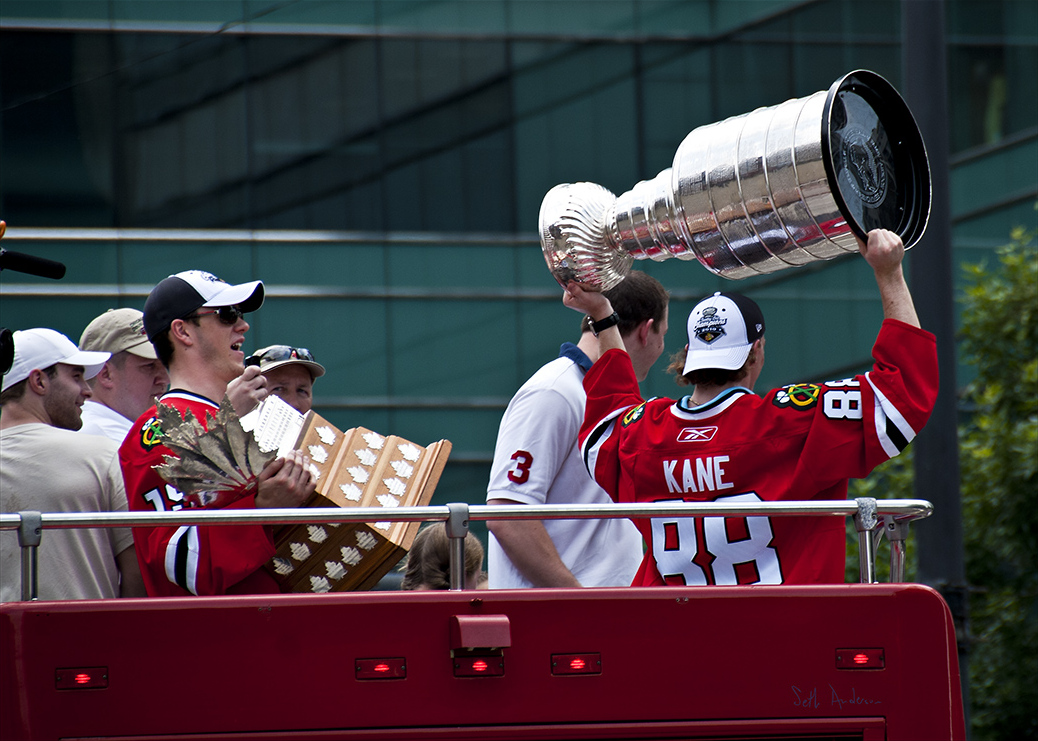
Patrick Kane hoisting the Stanley Cup and Jonathan Toews holding the Conn Smythe Trophy during the Blackhawks victory parade.

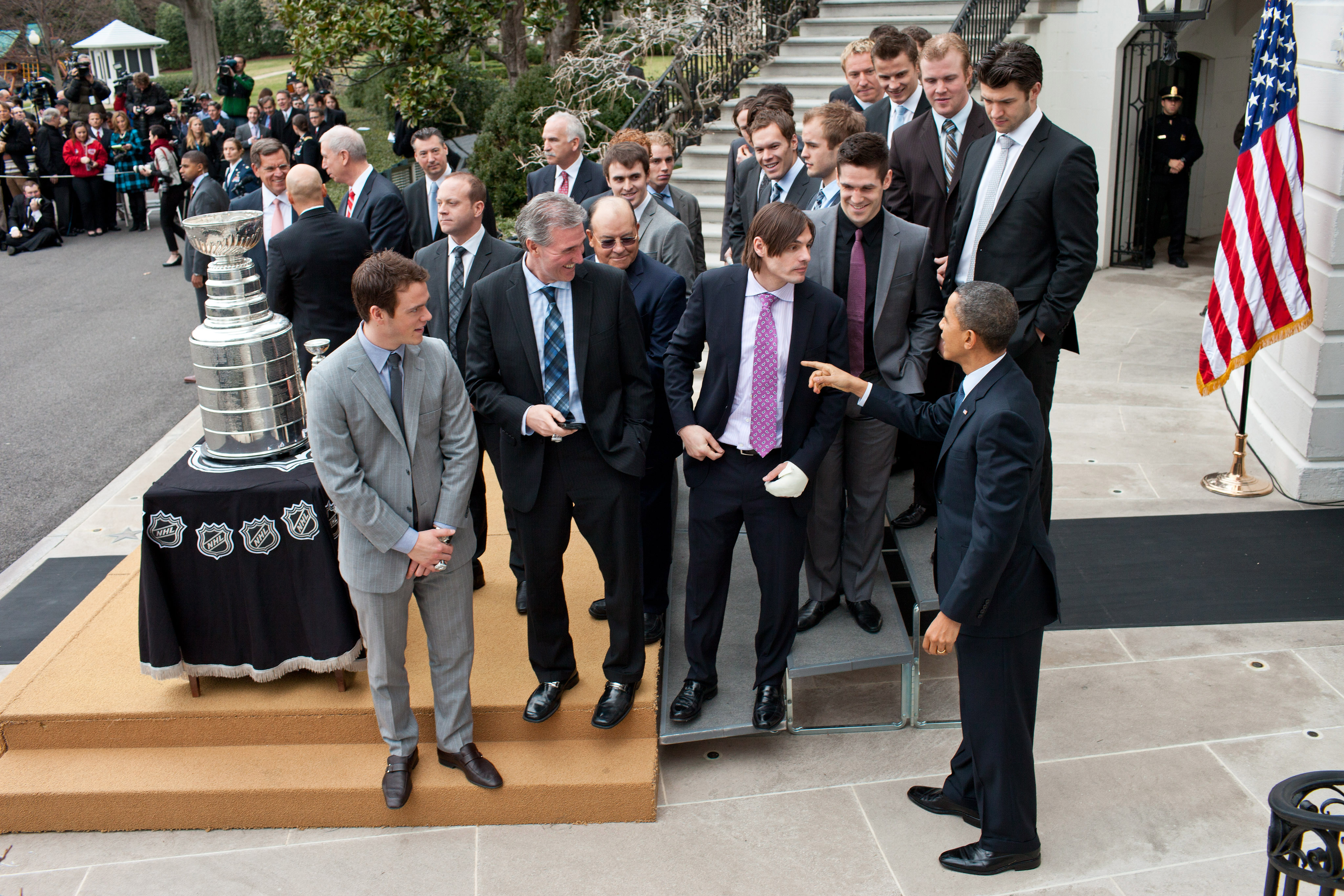
U.S. President Barack Obama with members of the Blackhawks after a ceremony to honor their 2010 Stanley Cup victory at the White House.

The Blackhawks re-signed Patrick Kane and Jonathan Toews to contract extensions worth $31.5 million over five years, and Duncan Keith to a 13-year extension worth $72 million on December 1, 2009. On April 6, 2010, the Hawks won their 50th game of the 2009–10 season against the Dallas Stars, setting a new franchise record for wins in a season. The next night, the Blackhawks notched their 109th point of the season in a game against the St. Louis Blues, setting another franchise record.

The Blackhawks made the playoffs for the second consecutive season with a regular season record of 52–22–8, finishing second in the Western Conference. They defeated the seventh-seeded Nashville Predators in six games in the first round before defeating the third-seeded Vancouver Canucks for the second straight year, again in six games. The Blackhawks then swept the top-seeded San Jose Sharks in the conference finals, advancing to the Stanley Cup Final for the first time since 1992, where they played the Philadelphia Flyers. The Blackhawks prevailed in six games against the seventh-seeded Flyers to secure their fourth Stanley Cup in franchise history, and their first since 1961, ending the team's 49-year championship drought.

==== 2010–2012: Building up for more consistency ====
The Blackhawks immediately faced salary cap constraints prior to the 2010–11 season. The team was forced to trade several players who played an integral role to their 2009–10 Stanley Cup victory, including Dustin Byfuglien, Andrew Ladd, Kris Versteeg, Brent Sopel, Ben Eager and Colin Fraser. The team was also unable to agree to terms with starting goaltender Antti Niemi, who left as restricted free agent to the San Jose Sharks. The Blackhawks signed former Dallas Stars starting goalie Marty Turco as his replacement, but eventually turned to rookie Corey Crawford to become their full-time starting goaltender. The Blackhawks also acquired Viktor Stålberg from the Toronto Maple Leafs and signed rookies Nick Leddy and Marcus Krüger to three-year entry-level contracts. The Blackhawks also made a mid-season trade to acquire winger Michael Frolík from the Florida Panthers in exchange for Jack Skille, Hugh Jessiman and David Pacan. Amidst the roster turnaround, the defending Stanley Cup champion Blackhawks finished the season with a 44–29–9 record, and placed third in the Central Division and eighth in the Western Conference. The team's playoff fate was determined on the final day of the regular season on April 10, 2011. The Blackhawks lost their regular season finale to the Detroit Red Wings 4–3 but still received the eighth and final seed in the Western Conference after the Minnesota Wild defeated the Dallas Stars later that same day 5–3. Had the Stars won their finale against the Wild, the Stars would’ve overtaken the defending Stanley Cup champion Blackhawks to the last playoff spot, which would’ve resulted in the Blackhawks dropping to ninth place in the West and missing the playoffs entirely by one point in the standings. In the first round of the 2011 playoffs, the Blackhawks faced the Presidents' Trophy-winning Vancouver Canucks, marking the third consecutive playoffs that the two teams faced each other, this time in the first round in contrast to the second round the previous two years prior. The Canucks built a three-game lead in the series before the Blackhawks were able to win the next three games in a row. Alex Burrows won game 7 for the Canucks in overtime, 2–1 to win the series 4–3.

Before the 2011–12 season, the Blackhawks continued to make roster moves to optimize their salary cap situation while also trying to stay in Stanley Cup contention. The team traded winger Troy Brouwer to the Washington Capitals in exchange for the 26th overall pick in the 2011 NHL entry draft (used to select Phillip Danault), and traded veteran defenseman Brian Campbell, who had one of the richest contracts in the franchise's history, to the Florida Panthers. The Blackhawks also traded veteran forward Tomáš Kopecký to the Panthers and forward Jake Dowell signed with the Dallas Stars in free agency in the 2011 off-season. The team bolstered their forward depth by signing veteran forwards Daniel Carcillo, Jamal Mayers and Andrew Brunette in free agency, while also acquiring goaltender Ray Emery in free agency to back-up Corey Crawford after Marty Turco left the team as a free agent. The Blackhawks also signed Andrew Shaw to a three-year, entry-level contract. The Blackhawks placed fourth in the Central Division and sixth in the Western Conference with a 45–26–11 record, and qualified for the playoffs for a fourth consecutive season. They faced the third-seeded Phoenix Coyotes in the opening round, who eliminated the Blackhawks in six games. The series saw five of the six games going to overtime, with Bryan Bickell (game 2) and Jonathan Toews (game 5) scoring the only Blackhawk overtime winners of the series.

==== 2012–2013: Presidents' Trophy and fifth Stanley Cup ====
The Blackhawks started the lockout-shortened 2012–13 season with much success by establishing several new records. On January 27, 2013, they set a new franchise record for starting the season 6–0–0 after a win against the Detroit Red Wings. On February 19, the Blackhawks tied the NHL record previously set by the 2006–07 Anaheim Ducks for earning points in the first 16 consecutive games of a season, and defeated the Ducks' record (28 points) by one point. On March 6, the Blackhawks extended the NHL record to 24 games with a record of 21–0–3, and the franchise record for most consecutive wins to 11 games. However, they lost 6–2 to the Colorado Avalanche on March 8, their first loss in regulation, which ended their 24-game streak in which they earned at least one point, an NHL record to start a season and the third-longest in NHL history.

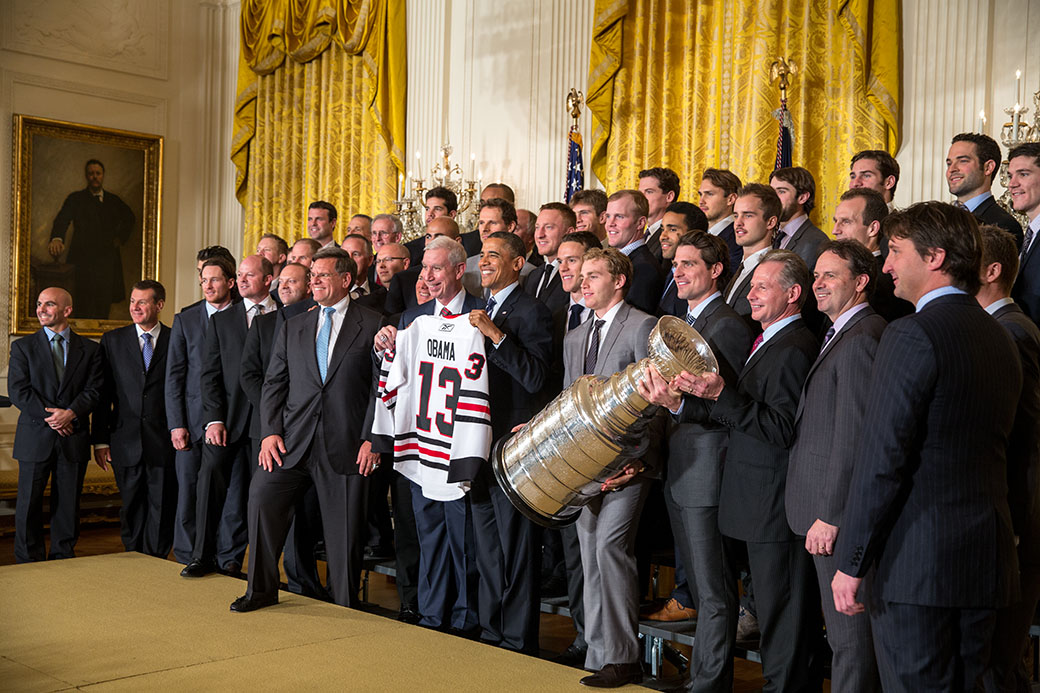
The 2013 Stanley Cup champion Blackhawks meet President Obama at the White House.

The United Center also recorded its 200th consecutive combined regular season and playoff Blackhawks sell-out on March 1 against the Columbus Blue Jackets, which began during the 2007–08 season with the game against the Blue Jackets on March 30, 2008. The Blackhawks won the Presidents' Trophy for the best regular season record in the NHL, and clinched home-ice advantage throughout the playoffs. After dispatching the eighth-seeded Minnesota Wild in the first round, the Blackhawks faced the seventh-seeded Detroit Red Wings in the conference semifinals. The Blackhawks won the series opener but lost the next three games and faced elimination. However, the Blackhawks clawed back into the series, eventually winning the series on a goal by Brent Seabrook in overtime of game 7. The team then defeated the defending Stanley Cup champion and fifth-seeded Los Angeles Kings in five games to secure a second Stanley Cup Final appearance in four seasons.

The Blackhawks faced the Boston Bruins in the 2013 Stanley Cup Final. It was the first time since 1979 that two Original Six teams had made the Stanley Cup Final and the first time since 1945 that the last four teams to win the Stanley Cup were in the conference finals. The Bruins made their second appearance in the Stanley Cup Final in three years (winning in 2011 in seven games against the Vancouver Canucks) and were making a similar resurgence as the Blackhawks. On June 24, the Blackhawks defeated the Bruins in the sixth game of the series to win the Stanley Cup, having overcome a 2–1 deficit with just over a minute remaining in the game. Bryan Bickell and Dave Bolland scored goals with 1:16 and 0:58.3 remaining in the game, just 17 seconds apart, to win 3–2.

==== 2013–2016: Sixth Stanley Cup and continued contention ====
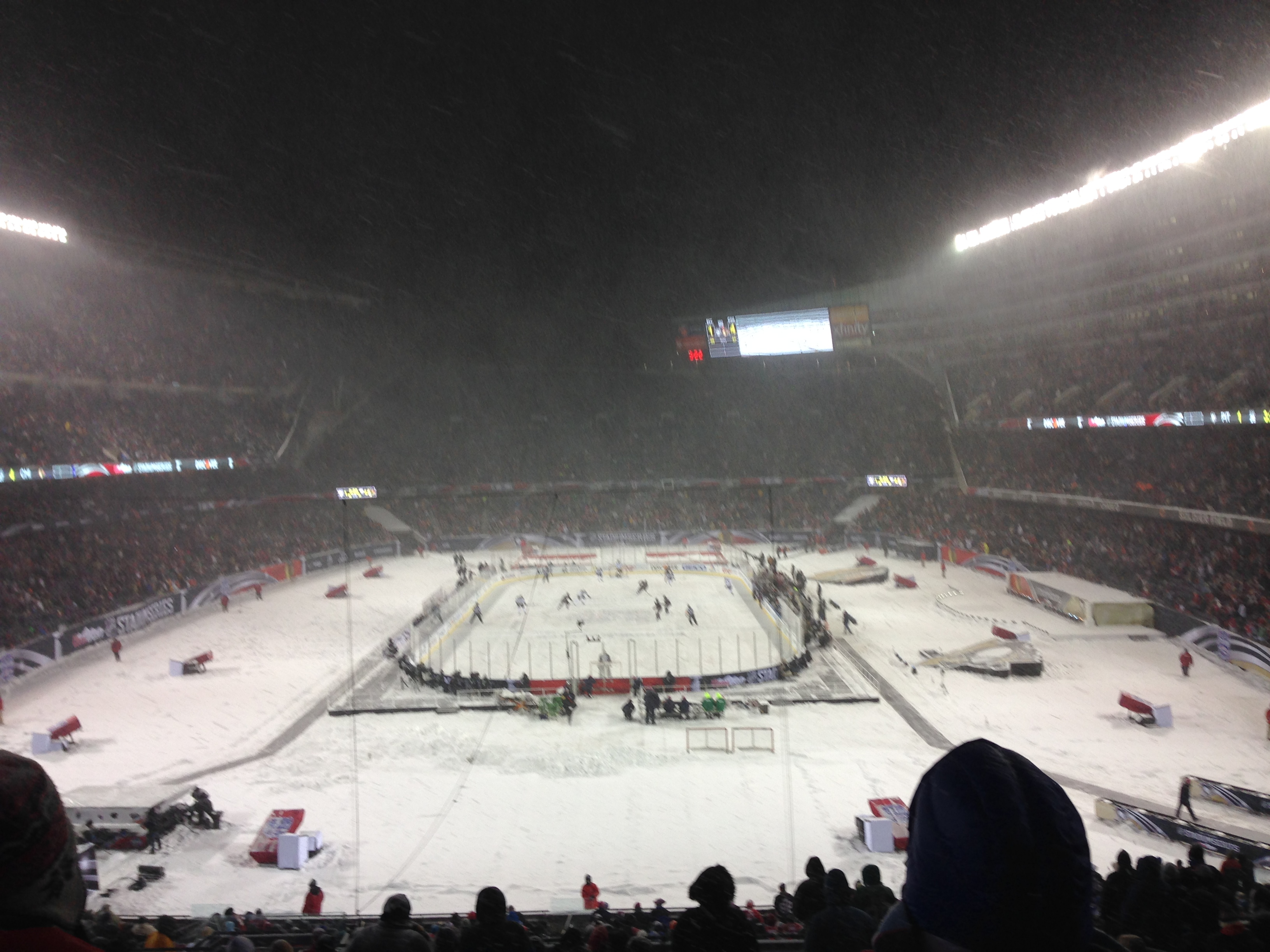
The Blackhawks played the Pittsburgh Penguins at Soldier Field for game four of the 2014 Stadium Series.

The Blackhawks began the 2013–14 season in hopes of becoming the first team to win consecutive Stanley Cups since the Detroit Red Wings in 1997 and 1998. The team was slightly altered in the off-season to remain under the salary cap. The team traded veteran forwards Dave Bolland, Daniel Carcillo and Michael Frolík in exchange for future draft picks, while parting ways with veteran goaltender Ray Emery and veteran winger Viktor Stålberg by having them leave in free agency. Despite these changes, the Blackhawks tallied a 28–7–7 record going into January 2014. The team played their second outdoor game in franchise history, against the Pittsburgh Penguins at Soldier Field, as part of the 2014 Stadium Series. The Blackhawks defeated the Penguins 5–1 in front of 62,921 fans. The franchise recorded its 2,500th regular season win, while head coach Joel Quenneville won 693 wins as a coach, the third most in the history of the NHL. The Blackhawks finished the season with a 46–21–15 record, good for third in the Central Division. They opened the playoffs by losing two games to the St. Louis Blues. The Blackhawks surged back with four straight wins to take the series. The team then defeated the Minnesota Wild for the second consecutive year. However, the Los Angeles Kings defeated the Blackhawks in seven games and ultimately went on to win the Stanley Cup. After the season's conclusion, Duncan Keith won the James Norris Memorial Trophy for the second time in his career, and captain Jonathan Toews was named a finalist for the Frank J. Selke Trophy for the second consecutive season and third time altogether.

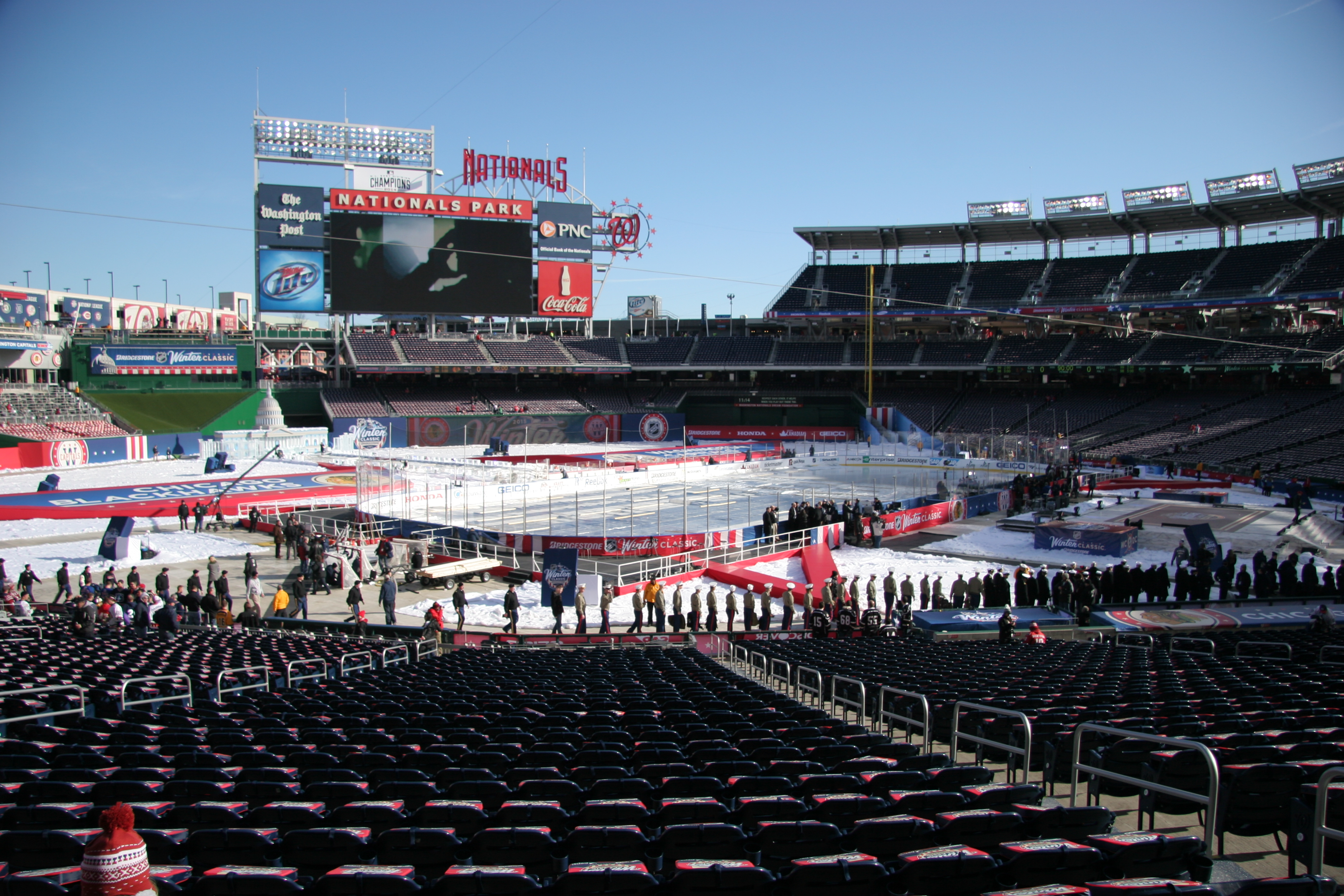
The Hawks faced the Washington Capitals at Nationals Park for the 2015 Winter Classic.

The Blackhawks' roster from the previous three seasons remained largely intact going into the 2014–15 season. In the 2014 off-season prior to the beginning of the 2014–15 season, the team signed veteran center Brad Richards and rookie goaltender Scott Darling to one-year contracts, and traded veteran defenseman Nick Leddy to the New York Islanders in exchange for three minor-league prospects. For the first half of the season, Patrick Kane led the team in scoring and points. The Blackhawks mustered a 30–15–2 record going into the All-Star break. The Blackhawks sent six players to the All-Star Game, including Kane, Jonathan Toews, Duncan Keith, Brent Seabrook and Corey Crawford. The team also played in the 2015 Winter Classic at Nationals Park in Washington, D.C., where they lost 3–2 to the Washington Capitals. However, in late February, Kane suffered a shoulder injury that was expected to sideline him for the remainder of the regular season and much of the playoffs. The team called up rookie Teuvo Teräväinen from the AHL, and traded their first-round pick in the 2015 NHL entry draft to acquire center Antoine Vermette from the Arizona Coyotes. The Blackhawks also acquired veteran defenseman Kimmo Timonen from the Philadelphia Flyers for second-round picks in 2015 and 2016, and Andrew Desjardins from the San Jose Sharks in exchange for Ben Smith. The Blackhawks finished the season with a 48–28–6 record, placing third in their division, and allowed the fewest goals in the NHL. Kane recovered quicker than expected, and was ready for the start of the playoffs. The Blackhawks dispatched the Nashville Predators in six games and swept the Minnesota Wild to advance to the conference finals for the fifth time in seven years. The top-seeded Anaheim Ducks held a 3–2 lead in the series, but the Blackhawks rallied back in the series to win games six and seven. The team then defeated the Tampa Bay Lightning in the 2015 Stanley Cup Final to secure their third Stanley Cup in six seasons to solidify themselves as a modern day NHL dynasty.

President Obama welcomes the Blackhawks to the White House for a third time to commemorate the team's 2015 Stanley Cup victory

The Blackhawks' roster experienced another dramatic reconstruction before the 2015–16 season. The team was unable to come to terms with pending free agent Brandon Saad, who had played a pivotal role in the 2013 and 2015 Stanley Cup championships. The Blackhawks traded Saad's negotiation rights (along with prospects Alex Broadhurst and Michael Paliotta) to the Columbus Blue Jackets in exchange for Artem Anisimov, Marko Daňo, Corey Tropp, Jeremy Morin and fourth-round draft pick Anatoly Golyshev in the 2016 NHL entry draft. The Blackhawks were unable to re-sign unrestricted free agents veterans Brad Richards, Antoine Vermette and Johnny Oduya due to salary cap constraints. The team then traded longtime veteran and fan-favorite Patrick Sharp (along with Stephen Johns) to the Dallas Stars in exchange for Trevor Daley and forward Ryan Garbutt in order to stay under the salary cap. Amidst the roster turnover, the Blackhawks signed free agent Artemi Panarin from the Kontinental Hockey League (KHL) to an entry-level contract. The Blackhawks' offense was led by Patrick Kane, who scored an NHL-best 106 points (46 goals, 60 assists) in all 82 games in 2015–16 capturing the Art Ross Trophy as his 46 goals saw him finish as the runner-up for the Maurice "Rocket" Richard Trophy only behind Washington Capitals forward and captain Alexander Ovechkin who scored 50 goals as the league leader. Kane also won the season's Hart Memorial Trophy as league MVP, the Ted Lindsay Award as the most outstanding player voted by the Players association. Panarin, who skated on Kane's line, won the Calder Memorial Trophy, awarded to the NHL's best first-year player. Midway through the season, the Blackhawks attempted to supplement their roster by making several trades. The Blackhawks dealt Jeremy Morin to the Toronto Maple Leafs in exchange for Richard Pánik. The team then reacquired Andrew Ladd from the Winnipeg Jets in exchange for their first round selection in the 2016 NHL entry draft and Marko Dano. The team then traded Phillip Danault and their 2018 second-round pick to the Montreal Canadiens in exchange for forwards Dale Weise and Tomáš Fleischmann. The team finished with a 46–26–9 record, good for 103 points and third place in their division. The defending Stanley Cup champion Blackhawks were defeated by the St. Louis Blues in a seven-game series in the first round of the 2016 playoffs. The loss marked the Blackhawks' earliest playoff exit since 2012.

==== 2016–2020: Post-Cup years and retooling ====
Salary cap constraints forced the Blackhawks to make additional trades before the 2016–17 season. The team traded pending free agent Andrew Shaw to the Montreal Canadiens in exchange for two second-round 2016 draft picks. The Blackhawks also traded Bryan Bickell and Teuvo Teravainen to the Carolina Hurricanes in exchange for another 2016 second-round pick along with letting Andrew Ladd walk in free agency in order to free additional salary cap space. The Blackhawks brought back veteran defenseman Brian Campbell and signed KHL stand-out Michal Kempný during free agency. The team then turned to their farm system to replenish their depth. The Blackhawks promoted rookies Ryan Hartman, Gustav Forsling, John Hayden, Tyler Motte, Nick Schmaltz and Vinnie Hinostroza to their starting line-up to fill the vacancies left by Ladd, Bickell, Shaw and Teravainen. During the season, Patrick Kane continued to spearhead the Blackhawks offense as he finished with 34 goals and 55 assists for 89 points in all 82 contests played, tying for second in scoring during the regular season among all skaters. He was aided by his linemate, Artemi Panarin, who scored 31 goals and 43 assists for 74 points in all 82 games. In addition to Kane and Panarin, Jonathan Toews, Marián Hossa, Artem Anisimov and Richard Pánik all scored at least 20 goals. Toews, Kane, Duncan Keith and Corey Crawford were also selected to play in the All-Star Game. At the trade deadline, the Blackhawks re-acquired Johnny Oduya in a trade with the Dallas Stars in exchange for Mark McNeill and a conditional fourth-round draft pick on 28 February 2017. The Blackhawks finished the season with 109 points, placing first in the Central Division and earning the top-seed in the Western Conference for the 2017 playoffs. However, they were swept in the first round by the eighth-seeded Nashville Predators in one of the biggest upsets in NHL playoff history; this was the first time that an eighth seed swept a playoff series against the top team in the conference. Goaltender Pekka Rinne and the Predators' defense marginalized the Blackhawks' offense, limiting the team to only three total goals in the series, including a pair of shutouts in game 1 (1–0) and game 2 (5–0) at United Center to begin the series.

Prior to the 2017–18 season, the Blackhawks revealed Marián Hossa would miss the entire 2017–18 season due to a progressive skin disorder. The team made two major trades before the 2017 NHL entry draft; veteran defenseman Niklas Hjalmarsson was dealt to the Arizona Coyotes in exchange for Connor Murphy and Laurent Dauphin, while Artemi Panarin was traded to the Columbus Blue Jackets to reacquire Brandon Saad in a four-player deal. Both Hjalmarsson and Hossa were core members of the Blackhawks roster that won three Stanley Cups in 2010, 2013 and 2015. The team also traded goaltender Scott Darling to the Carolina Hurricanes and center Marcus Krüger to the Vegas Golden Knights, while also lost defensemen Trevor van Riemsdyk to the Golden Knights in the 2017 NHL expansion draft and Brian Campbell, who retired. The Blackhawks also let Andrew Desjardins and Johnny Oduya in free agency. The Blackhawks re-acquired winger Patrick Sharp in free agency while also adding Tommy Wingels and Lance Bouma in free agency. The Blackhawks opened the 2017–18 season with a resounding 10–1 victory over the defending Stanley Cup champion Pittsburgh Penguins. The Blackhawks were four games above .500 with an 18–14–6 record at the end of December 2017, and only four points out of a playoff spot. However, goaltender Corey Crawford would sustain an undisclosed upper-body injury (which was later revealed to be a concussion) right before Christmas break, sidelining him for the remainder of the year. Inconsistent defense and goaltending, coupled with limited offense, resulted in the team falling to the bottom of the Central Division. The Blackhawks were eliminated from playoff contention on March 20, 2018, marking the first time in nine years that the team failed to qualify for the Stanley Cup playoffs. The team finished the season with a 33–39–10 record and 76 points in the standings, 19 points out of a playoff spot.

The Blackhawks made modest acquisitions during the opening day of free agency in 2018 by acquiring veterans Cam Ward, Chris Kunitz and Brandon Manning. The team made their biggest move of the off-season by offloading Hossa's contract onto the Arizona Coyotes by trading Vinnie Hinostroza, Jordan Oesterle and third-round draft pick in the 2019 draft in exchange for Marcus Krüger, MacKenzie Entwistle, Jordan Maletta, Andrew Campbell and a fifth-round draft pick in the 2019 NHL Draft. Quenneville named Ward the team's starting goaltender as Crawford missed the first five games of the 2018–19 season with concussion-like symptoms. The Blackhawks opened the season with a promising 6–2–2 start despite Crawford's initial absence. However, after losing their next five games, head coach Joel Quenneville (as well as assistant coaches Kevin Dineen and Ulf Samuelsson) were fired on November 6, 2018. Jeremy Colliton, previously the head coach of the Blackhawks' AHL affiliate, the Rockford IceHogs, was named the 38th head coach in franchise history. The team adjusted their roster by trading Nick Schmaltz to the Arizona Coyotes in exchange for Dylan Strome and Brendan Perlini. The Blackhawks then dealt Brandon Manning to the Edmonton Oilers in exchange for Drake Caggiula. The team struggled despite these changes and plummeted to the bottom of the NHL's standings by the All-Star break, but then rebounded with an 18–10–3 record during the second half of the season, and missed playoffs by six points, while finishing in sixth place in the Central Division. After missing the playoffs for the second straight season, the Blackhawks won the third-overall pick in the 2019 NHL entry draft at the draft lottery, which they used to select Kirby Dach.

Prior to the 2019–20 season, the Blackhawks signed center Ryan Carpenter and goaltender Robin Lehner on the opening day of free agency. The team made three separate trades to acquire Olli Määttä, Calvin de Haan and Alex Nylander. The team reacquired fan-favorite Andrew Shaw in a trade with the Montreal Canadiens. The Blackhawks also inserted rookie Dominik Kubalík into their roster, whom they acquired from the Los Angeles Kings in the previous season. Chris Kunitz and Cam Ward retired while the Blackhawks also traded veteran center Artem Anisimov to the Ottawa Senators in exchange for Zack Smith and let veteran center Marcus Krüger walk in free agency. The Blackhawks posted a 32–30–8 record and finished last in their division before the remainder of the regular season was canceled due to the COVID-19 pandemic. The team fired John McDonough, who served as the Blackhawks' president for 13 years. The Blackhawks obtained a spot in the 2020 Stanley Cup playoffs, which used a 24-team playoff format among the top 12 teams in each conference. The 12th-seeded Blackhawks defeated the Edmonton Oilers in the qualifying round of the playoffs to advance to the Western Conference first round, where they lost to the Vegas Golden Knights in five games.

==== 2020–2023: The Toews and Kane era ends ====
The 2020–21 season would be delayed to January 2021 and condensed to 56 games due to the ongoing COVID-19 pandemic. The Blackhawks signed forwards Mattias Janmark, Lucas Wallmark and Carl Söderberg during free agency to one-year deals. Veteran forward Brandon Saad was traded to the Colorado Avalanche for defensemen Nikita Zadorov and Anton Lindholm. The team's captain, Jonathan Toews, announced he would forgo the season due to an undisclosed medical illness. The Blackhawks parted with longtime goaltender Corey Crawford, who signed with the New Jersey Devils but ultimately retired before the season's start without playing any games for the Devils. Brent Seabrook, the team's veteran defenseman, announced his retirement midway through the season due a lingering hip injury sustained the previous season. Andrew Shaw, who previously rejoined the Blackhawks in 2019, also announced he would retire from playing due to concussions suffered throughout his career. The Blackhawks relied heavily on their rookies during the season to replenish their depth, including forwards Brandon Hagel, Philipp Kurashev and Pius Suter, defensemen Ian Mitchell and Wyatt Kalynuk and goaltender Kevin Lankinen. Despite the roster turnaround, the Blackhawks completed the first half of the season with a 14–9–5 record and sat in fourth place in their division. The team struggled from mid-March through April, going 8–15–1, and subsequently traded away Janmark, Wallmark and Soderberg at the trade deadline. The Blackhawks failed to qualify for the playoffs once more and finished in sixth place with a 24–25–7 record. The Blackhawks named Danny Wirtz, the son of Rocky Wirtz, as their new chief executive officer on December 16, 2020. The team made some significant changes in their front office, promoting the general manager, Stan Bowman, to the role of president of hockey operations, and appointing Jaime Faulkner as the new president of business operations.

Prior to the 2021–22 season, former Blackhawks prospect Kyle Beach alleged he was sexually assaulted by Brad Aldrich, the team's former video coach, during the 2009–10 season. Beach filed a lawsuit against the Blackhawks for failing to adequately address Aldrich's wrongdoings or file formal police reports. A separate party, a former high school student whom Aldrich sexually assaulted during his tenure at Houghton High School also filed a lawsuit against the Blackhawks, alleging the team gave a positive reference on behalf of Aldrich and failed to disclose any details about his sexual assault in 2010. The Blackhawks retained law firm Jenner & Block to conduct an internal investigation that spanned 139 interviews over four months. It revealed that the team's brain trust, including team president John McDonough, executive vice president Jay Blunk, general manager Stan Bowman, assistant general manager Kevin Cheveldayoff and head coach Joel Quenneville, met just days before the start of the 2010 Stanley Cup Final and deferred any action on Aldrich until after the Cup Final series. Aldrich was subsequently allowed to quietly resign after taking part in the Stanley Cup victory celebration. Within hours of the report's release on October 26, 2021, Bowman and senior director of hockey operations Al MacIsaac, the only participants in the 2010 meeting still with the Blackhawks, resigned. Assistant general manager Kyle Davidson took over as interim general manager. The NHL also imposed a $2 million fine on the Blackhawks for "inadequate internal procedures and insufficient and untimely response in the handling of matters related to former video coach Brad Aldrich's employment". It also stated that most of the participants in the meeting, including McDonough, Bowman, Blunk, and MacIssac, will not be allowed to work in the NHL again without permission from the league office. Quenneville, by then head coach of the Florida Panthers, resigned after meeting with Bettman on October 28, and will also have to meet with Bettman if he wants to work in the league again. Bettman subsequently met with Cheveldayoff, by now the general manager of the Winnipeg Jets, but cleared him of wrongdoing. Bettman stated that he could not "assign to [Cheveldayoff] responsibility for the Club's actions, or inactions" because Cheveldayoff was not a member of the Blackhawks' senior leadership team at the time. Aldrich's name was removed from the Stanley Cup, as requested by the team. Beach and the Blackhawks reached an undisclosed settlement on December 15. However, the second lawsuit filed against the Blackhawks by a former high school student was dismissed.

Before his resignation, Bowman intended on building a competitive team that could make the playoffs immediately rather than focusing on rebuilding for the future. The team traded veteran defenseman Duncan Keith to the Edmonton Oilers in exchange for a draft pick and Caleb Jones. The Blackhawks traded Brent Seabrook's contract to the Tampa Bay Lightning in exchange for center Tyler Johnson. The team then acquired Seth Jones from the Columbus Blue Jackets in exchange for two draft picks and prospect Adam Boqvist. The Blackhawks leveraged their open salary cap to acquire reigning Vezina Trophy-winner Marc-André Fleury from the Vegas Golden Knights, who were in desperate need of cap relief. The team signed defensemen Jake McCabe and winger Jujhar Khaira in free agency. Blackhawks captain Jonathan Toews, who had missed the entirety of the previous season due to chronic immune response syndrome, also announced he would return for the 2021–22 season.

On November 6, Colliton was fired after leading the team to a 1–9–2 record to start the season, the second-worst in the NHL at the time. Derek King, former Rockford IceHogs head coach, was named his interim replacement. Davidson was formally named the team's general manager on March 1, 2022. The Blackhawks were unable to recover from their poor start and fell out of playoff contention by the trade deadline. The team traded Brandon Hagel to Tampa Bay in exchange for two first-round picks, Boris Katchouk and Taylor Raddysh, while also trading Fleury to the Minnesota Wild in exchange for a second-round pick. The team finished sixth place in Central Division with a 28–42–12 record. The 2021–22 season also marked announcer Pat Foley's final season with the Blackhawks, who had been with the team for 39 years.

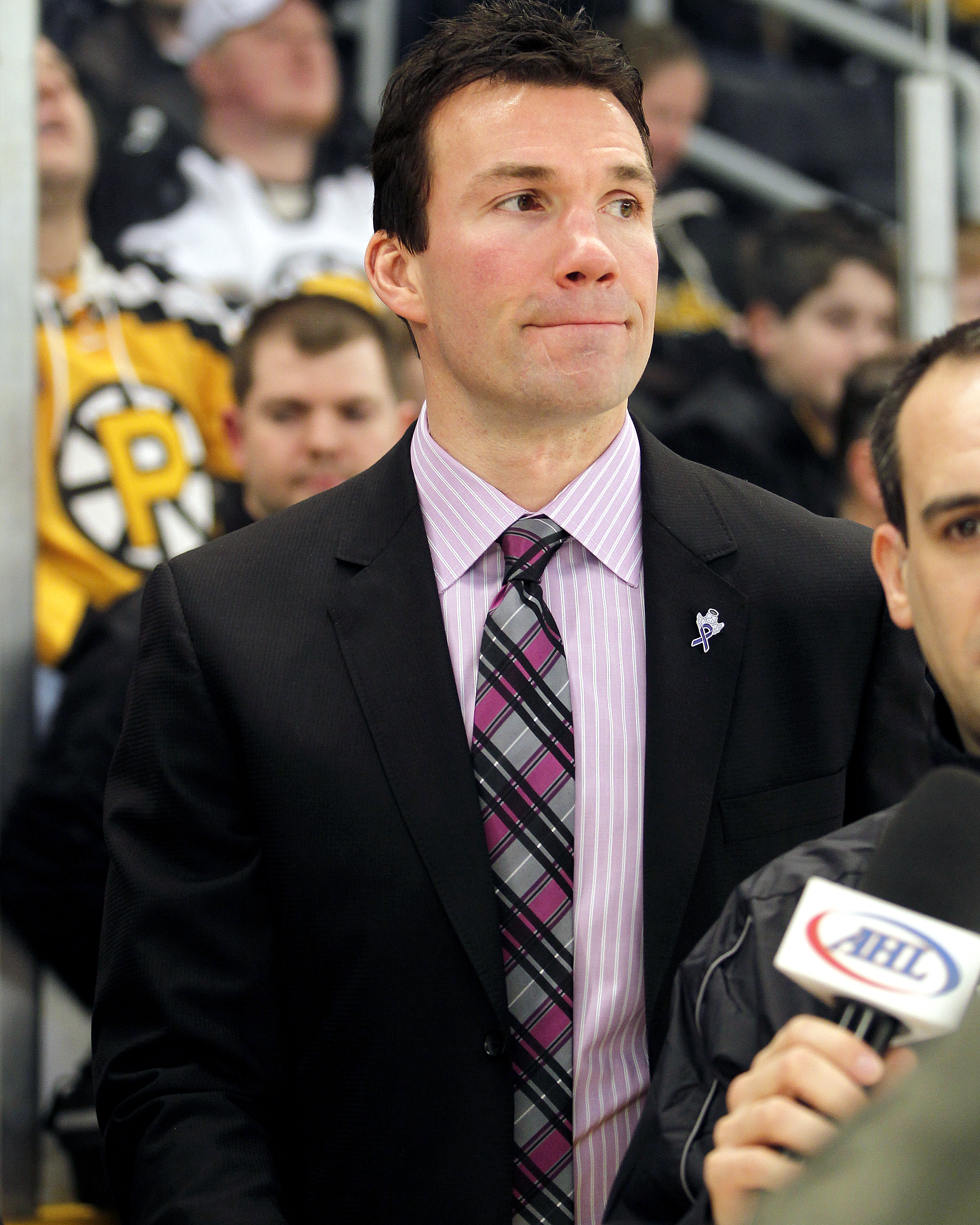
The Blackhawks hired Luke Richardson as the 40th coach in their franchise's history in 2022.

On June 27, 2022, the Blackhawks named Luke Richardson as their 40th head coach in franchise history. General manager Davidson announced the Blackhawks would commit to rebuilding their roster and acquiring draft capital. The team traded Alex DeBrincat to the Ottawa Senators and Kirby Dach to the Montreal Canadiens in exchange for the 7th and 13th picks in the 2022 NHL entry draft. Chicago also acquired the 25th overall pick in the draft from the Toronto Maple Leafs by taking on goaltender Petr Mrázek's contract. The Blackhawks made modest acquisitions in free agency, signing veteran forwards Andreas Athanasiou, Colin Blackwell and Max Domi. The team fell to the bottom of the Central Division and again emerged as sellers at the 2022–23 trade deadline. Patrick Kane was traded to the Arizona Coyotes in exchange for Vili Saarijärvi and Kane was then later sent to the New York Rangers as part of a three-team trade. The Blackhawks received Andy Welinski, a conditional second-round pick in 2023 and a fourth-round pick in 2025 from the Rangers to complete the trade. The Blackhawks also dealt Jake McCabe, Sam Lafferty and Max Domi, while also taking on Nikita Zaitsev's contract from the Ottawa Senators in exchange for additional draft capital. Captain Jonathan Toews missed 29 games while recovering from Long COVID. Before their final regular season game, the team also announced that they would not re-sign Toews. The Blackhawks finished last in their division with the third-worst record in the NHL.

=== Danny Wirtz era (2023–present) ===
==== 2023–present: Rebuilding and beginning of the Connor Bedard era ====
The Blackhawks won the 2023 draft lottery and received the first overall pick in the 2023 NHL entry draft. The team drafted Connor Bedard first overall. The Blackhawks subsequently made trades to acquire veteran forwards Taylor Hall, Nick Foligno and Corey Perry. The team leveraged their excess salary cap space to acquire Josh Bailey and 2026 second-round draft pick from the cap-strapped New York Islanders. Bailey's contract was immediately bought out and he was placed on unconditional waivers. The Blackhawks signed forward Ryan Donato to a two-year, $4 million contact on the opening day of free agency.

Rocky Wirtz unexpectedly died on July 25, 2023, at age 70. Danny Wirtz, his son, was named the chairman and president of Wirtz Corporation, the company that owns the Blackhawks, on July 30. Amidst the transitions in ownership, the Blackhawks continued to struggle on the ice by finishing the 2023–24 NHL season with a 23–53–6 record, marking the second-worst in the NHL and the worst in franchise history since 1974. The team was devastated by injuries to several skaters throughout the season, including Bedard, Hall, Andreas Athanasiou, and Colin Blackwell. The Blackhawks also terminated the contract of Corey Perry, who violated the team's code of conduct policy. Bedard was recipient of Calder Memorial Trophy, awarded to the NHL's top first-year player.

On December 5, 2024, the Blackhawks fired Luke Richardson after tallying a league-worst 18 points through the first 26 games of the 2024–25 season, naming Anders Sorensen interim head coach.

Patrick Kane returned to the Blackhawks in the 2026-27 season after signing a two-year contract. On September 15, 2026, Connor Bedard was named captain of the Blackhawks, at 21 years and 60 days old becoming the second youngest captain ever of the franchise after Jonathan Toews.

== Team information ==
=== Jerseys ===
The Blackhawks wear predominantly red jerseys featuring three sets of black and white stripes along the sleeves and waist, and white jerseys featuring three sets of alternating black, white and red stripes along the sleeves and waist. The team's logo is displayed on the front of each jersey, along with a "C", representing "Chicago", on each shoulder with two crossed tomahawks. The Blackhawks debuted this design in 1955, and have since only made minor modifications to the jersey. In 2007, the Blackhawks along with all other NHL teams, made minute changes to their uniforms by adding larger logo, a new collar with the NHL logo and a "baseball-style cut" along the bottom. The team previously donned alternate third jersey that was primarily black with red and white stripes between 1996 and 2007. The Blackhawks brought this design back in 2008, before making their 2009 Winter Classic jerseys their alternates between 2009 and 2011. After the 2019 Winter Classic, the Blackhawks made their jersey from the game their alternate, wearing it for three more games in 2019 and in three games during the 2019–20 season.

The Blackhawks' uniform was voted 1 of the 25 best in professional sports by Paul Lukas of GQ in November 2004. The Hockey News voted the team's jersey as the best in the NHL. Greg Wyshynski of Yahoo! Sports listed the Blackhawks home jerseys as the second best NHL jersey in the history of the NHL in 2017. The Blackhawks were voted to have the best uniform in the history of the NHL in a fan-vote conducted by the NHL in 2017.

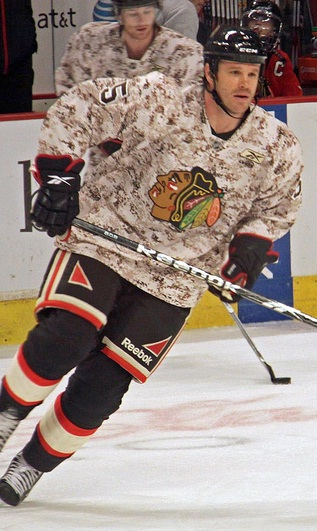
The Blackhawks have donned Camouflage practice jerseys for Veterans Day to show support for servicemen since 2009.

Since 2009, the Blackhawks have worn special camouflage jerseys on Veterans Day during their pregame warm-ups. The jerseys are later sold in auctions to raise money for the USO of Illinois.

The Blackhawks wore jerseys based on the design worn in the 1936–37 season for the 2009 Winter Classic. The jersey is predominantly black with a large beige stripe across the chest (also on the sleeves), with a red border, and an old-style circular Black Hawks logo. The Blackhawks used this Winter Classic design as their third jersey for the 2009–10 season until they retired it after the 2010–11 season, with the only change in the design being the addition of the familiar "C" with crossed tomahawks on the shoulders.

For the 2014 Stadium Series, the Blackhawks wore a black uniform similar to the alternates they wore from 1996 to 2009, but the stripes around the waist are no longer straight, they are jagged around the sides in order to follow the shape of the bottom of the jersey. Keeping with stripes, the ones on the arms simply stop halfway round; angled numbers are above these sleeve half-stripes. On one shoulder is the familiar "C" with crossed tomahawks logo and the Chicago 2014 Stadium Series logo on the other. Each 2014 Stadium Series jerseys features chrome-treated logo designs inspired by the NHL shield. The chrome crest was developed using new technology that fuses print and embroidery and allows logos to be displayed as a high-resolution image incorporated into the crest. As a result, the design reduces the weight of the crest, creating a lighter jersey. Numbering on the back of the jersey is enlarged and sleeve numbers are angled to improve visibility in outdoor venues.

The team wore a uniform which was inspired by their 1957–58 jersey for the 2015 Winter Classic. This uniform is nearly identical to the road uniform that the Blackhawks currently wear. The main differences between this design and the current road design come in the form of the lace-up collar, the name/number block font (which is serifed), and the C-Tomahawk logo, which is mostly red, black, and white (with a tad bit of yellow) instead of being mostly red, yellow, green black and white.

For the 2016 Stadium Series, the Blackhawks wore a unique uniform for their game against the Minnesota Wild. This uniform is primarily white with black/red/black stripes on the sleeves and socks. The current logo is on the chest. Framed between the two black stripes and over the red stripe on the sleeve is the familiar "C" with crossed tomahawks. The collar of the uniform features two different colors. The four, six-pointed red stars from the Flag of Chicago is featured on the white portion of the collar, while the other side of the collar is black. Sleeve numbers have been shifted to the shoulders and enlarged. With the shoulders being black, the numbering is white. But, the numbering and lettering on the back is also enlarged and black in color.

For the 2017 Winter Classic, the Blackhawks wore uniforms very similar to what they wore at the 2015 Winter Classic. These new uniforms however feature a few modifications that were made to them. The most notable changes are to the logo and the cross tomahawks. The logo this time is the appropriate logo that the franchise used in 1957–1965, but they removed the roundel and the lettering so that just the logo itself stands out. The placement of the familiar "C" with crossed tomahawks is featured in the same position with the same striping pattern on the sleeve as the 2015 Winter Classic uniform had. The only differences between the tomahawks from the 2015 Winter Classic uniform and the 2017 Winter Classic uniform are where the colors are placed for the tomahawk. The 2017 Winter Classic patch is featured on the right shoulder.

To honor the NHL's centennial year, a special anniversary logo was designed for the remainder of the 2016–17 season, which started on January 1, 2017, for all thirty teams, featuring a banner wrapped around the number 100 with the current NHL shield in the foreground. Both the banner and the number 100 are in same silver color as the NHL shield. The Blackhawks wore this logo patch underneath the numbering on the right-sleeve on both the home and away jerseys. The Blackhawks debuted this patch on their home jerseys on January 5, 2017, and then they debuted the patch on the away jerseys on January 13, 2017. All home and away jerseys for all 30 teams will continue to have patches of the NHL's centennial emblem for the 2017–18 season, located above or below the numbers on their right sleeves, for at least up to the playing of the NHL 100 Classic on December 16, 2017.

Adidas signed an agreement with the NHL to be the official outfitter of uniforms and licensed apparel for all teams, starting with the 2017–18 season, replacing Reebok. The Reebok "Edge" template was retired in favor of the Adidas' "ADIZERO" template. The home and away uniforms that were debuted in the 2007–08 season remain nearly identical with the exception of the new Adidas ADIZERO template and the new collar. With the new collar, the NHL shield remains but is no longer placed on a lower layer with flaps nearby, as it's now front and center on a pentagon with a new "Chrome Flex" style. The waist stripes are now curved instead of being straight across. The Adidas logo replaces the Reebok logo on the back collar.

For the entire 2018–19 season, on both the home and away uniforms, the Blackhawks wore memorial patches in remembrance of Stan Mikita, who died on August 7, 2018. The memorial patch featured 21 in white on a black circle that is placed on the upper left corner on the front side of the uniform.

For the 2019 Winter Classic, the Blackhawks wore uniforms similar to what they wore from the 1926–27 season to the 1934–35 season. The black and white uniform features the black and white Native American head logo on a black and white roundel with the wording "Blackhawks" arched on top and "Chicago" arched below. The Native American head logo inside the roundel features the 1999–2000 native American head logo that they currently wear. The uniform has four white stripes on each of the shoulders, and five white stripes of varying thickness on each sleeve and around the waist. Inside the collar, we see several diagonal white lines, which is a nod to the end zone design used at Notre Dame Stadium. Mixed in between these white lines are the six years written in red, the six years the Blackhawks won the Stanley Cup. The Blackhawks won the Stanley Cup in 1934, 1938, 1961, 2010, 2013 and 2015. After the 2019 Winter Classic, the team announced that uniforms from the game would be worn in three home games of the 2018–19 season.

For the 2019–20 season, the home and away uniforms that were unveiled for the 2017–18 season remain nearly identical with the exception of the new collar designs. The new collar on the home uniform transitions from white to a solid red on the front as it comes over the shoulder, leading into the NHL logo with a red background in the center. The new collar on the away uniform transitions from red to a solid white on the front as it comes over the shoulder, leading into the NHL logo with a white background in the center.

Beginning with the 2020–21 season, the NHL allowed for advertising on its gameday uniforms for the first time, starting with helmet ads. The Blackhawks' first helmet ad sponsor was United Airlines.

For the 2020–21 NHL season, the Blackhawks would wear "Reverse Retro" alternate uniforms. The design was largely inspired from the team's 1940s uniforms save for the "barber-pole" elements. A second "Reverse Retro" uniform was released in the 2022–23 season, based on their 1938 uniform. Across the chest is "CHICAGO" in white with red trim, inspired by the 2019 Winter Classic crest and the current Blackhawks primary logo is added as a shoulder patch on the left side.

Starting with the 2021–22 NHL regular season, Adidas introduced new environmentally-friendly uniforms for all teams with its Adidas ADIZERO Primegreen Authentic template. The template is made with a minimum of 50% recycled content while still retaining their high-performance materials. Each team uniform will maintain its classic stripping and logo, while boasting dimensional embroidery that draws attention to their sustainable materials, and a two-layer twill that underscores the product's authenticity. For the Blackhawks, the logo on their uniforms now feature raised markings on the face of their logo, the forehead lines, the eyebrow and eye, as well as the facepaint are all now raised rather than flat as it had been before.

For the entire 2021–22 season, on both the home and away uniforms, the Blackhawks wore memorial patches in remembrance of Tony Esposito, who died on August 10, 2021. The memorial patch features 35 in white on a black circle that is placed on the upper left corner on the front side of the uniform.

For the entire 2023–24 season, on both the home and away uniforms, the Blackhawks are wearing memorial patches in remembrance of Rocky Wirtz, who died on July 25, 2023. The memorial patch features "ROCKY" in white on a black circle that is placed on the upper left corner on the front side of the uniform.

Starting with the 2024–25 season, Fanatics debuted the Authentic Pro NHL on-ice uniforms that replaces Adidas. As part of the new uniform design, there will be an additional layer of fabric inside the lower sleeve to reduce wear caused by friction against the boards. The NHL Shield has a new special hologram finish on the front collar, and Fanatics branding is embroidered on the back neck of the uniform. The Blackhawks announced a multi-year partnership with Circa Sports in June 2024, making them the official jersey patch sponsor for the team's home red uniforms.

The Blackhawks wore retro-inspired red uniforms for the 2025 Winter Classic, which incorporated a lace-up collar. The crest featured the current Blackhawks logo inside a black roundel, which contained two red six-point stars on each side (a nod to the flag of Chicago), the team name on top and the city name at the bottom. The alternating black and white chest and sleeve striping is based on the current red uniform's tail striping, and the back cream numbers featured subtle pinstripes as homage to Wrigley Field's main tenants, the Chicago Cubs.

For the team's 2025–26 centennial season, the Blackhawks modified their red home uniforms, adding lace-up collars and gold trim around the crest and back numbers. The 100th anniversary patch replaced the "crossing tomahawks" patch on the right shoulder. Also during the season, the alternate black uniform they previously wore from 1996 to 2007 and in the 2008–09 season was brought back.

The Blackhawks unveiled their "Hometown Remix" uniform during the 2026–27 season. The design swapped the red base on their home uniform for green as a nod to the annual dyeing of the Chicago River during Saint Patrick's Day, which began in 1961, the same year the Black Hawks won the Stanley Cup. The uniform was inspired by Chicago's spirit of progress.

=== Logo ===
This vintage logo was brought back in 1991, 2008, and 2021; it was their primary logo from the 1937–38 to 1954–55 seasons.

Irene Castle, McLaughlin's wife, designed the original version of the team's logo, which featured a crudely drawn black and white Native head in a circle. Castle, the original designer, was white. This design went through several significant changes between 1926 and 1955. During this period, seven distinct versions of the primary logo were worn on the team's uniforms. At the beginning of the 1955–56 season, the outer circle was removed and the head began to resemble the team's current primary logo. This crest and uniform went through subtle changes until the 1964–65 season; the basic logo and jersey design have remained constant ever since. In 2008, The Hockey News' staff voted the team's main logo to be the best in the NHL. In 2010, sports columnist Damien Cox called on the franchise to retire the "racially insensitive" logo, saying that, "Clearly, no right-thinking person would name a team after an aboriginal figure these days any more than they would use Muslims or Africans or Chinese or any ethnic group to depict a specific sporting notion." Furthermore, the National Congress of American Indians (NCAI) believes that all Native-themed logos, including that of the Blackhawks, "continue to profit from harmful stereotypes originated during a time when white superiority and segregation were common place."

In 2019, the American Indian Center of Chicago ended all ties to the Chicago Blackhawks Foundation, stating they will no longer affiliate "with organizations that perpetuate stereotypes through the use of 'Indian' mascots." The AIC noted in its statement that they "previously held a relationship with the Chicago Blackhawks Foundation with the intention of educating the general public about American Indians and the use of logos and mascots. The AIC, along with members of the community have since decided to end this relationship" and stated that "going forward, AIC will have no professional ties with the Blackhawks, or any other organization that perpetuates harmful stereotypes."

On July 7, 2020, the Blackhawks issued a press release to defend their team's name and logo. The team stated, "The Chicago Blackhawks name and logo symbolizes an important and historic person, Black Hawk of Illinois' Sac & Fox Nation, whose leadership and life has inspired generations of Native Americans, veterans and the public." The Blackhawks further stated they would "expand awareness" of Black Hawk and all Indigenous American contributions. The press release came after other American professional sports teams, including the Washington Redskins and Cleveland Indians, changed their names and logos.

The National Congress of American Indians, The American Indian Center of Chicago, The Chi-Nations Youth Council and over 1,500 Native organizations and advocates from over 150 federally recognized tribes across the country, including members of the Sac and Fox Nation, support changing the team name and logo. Members of Black Hawk's family, including April Holder (Sauk and Fox, Wichita, Tonkawa), a direct descendant of Black Hawk, have also spoken out calling on the team to change its name and logo and to stop profiting off Black Hawk's name, image, and legacy.

The Chi-Nations Youth Council (CNYC), an Indigenous youth organization in Chicago, has said "The Chicago Blackhawks name and logo symbolizes a legacy of imperialism and genocide." "As statutes (sic) of invaders, slave holders, and white supremacists fall across the nation so too should the images and language of the savage and dead 'Indians'." CNYC also noted "As social consciousness has grown over the past decades so has the Blackhawks performative gestures of buying their reprieve from those willing to sell out the health and humanity of our future generations."

=== Mascot ===
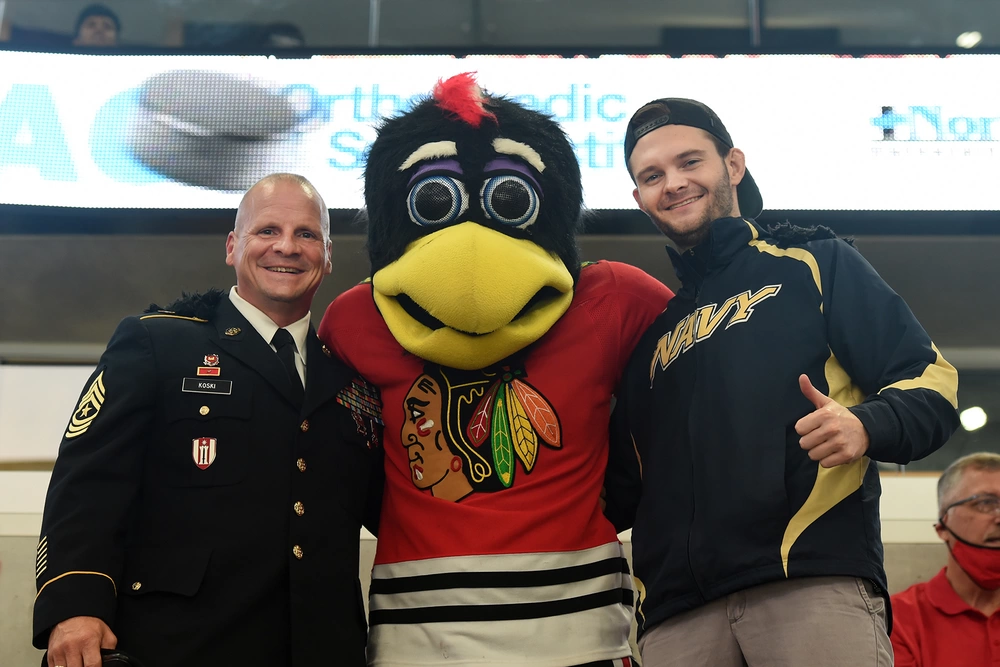
Tommy Hawk poses with servicemen in October 2021.

The Blackhawks mascot is Tommy Hawk, an anthropomorphic black hawk who wears the Blackhawks' four feathers on his head, along with a Blackhawks jersey and hockey pants. Tommy Hawk often participates in the T-shirt toss and puck chuck at the United Center. He walks around the concourse greeting fans before and during the game. The team introduced Tommy Hawk in the 2001–02 season. Tommy Hawk was inducted into the Mascot Hall of Fame in 2019.

=== Practice facilities ===
The Blackhawks practice facility, the Blackhawks Ice Center (previously named MB Ice Arena prior to May 2019 and Fifth Third Arena from May 2019 to January 2026), is located in Chicago's Near West Side. When the facility originally opened in 2017, it was 125,000-square-foot (11,600 m^{2}) and cost $65 million to construct. An expansion was announced in 2025 and completed in January 2026, adding two new ice rinks and expanding the total size to 250,000 square feet (23,000 m^{2}). The Blackhawks Ice Center also serves as a community center and hosts youth, high school, and adult hockey and ice skating programs, and will serve as the home of the Chicago Steel of the United States Hockey League (USHL) when the 2026-27 USHL season begins. The Steel will play at USG Arena, a 2000+ seated arena that was added in the 2026 expansion.

The Blackhawks had previously used Johnny's Ice House West and The Edge Ice Arena in suburban Bensenville (the latter also previously used by the Steel) as their practice facility.

=== Circus trip ===
The Blackhawks and their arena mates, the Chicago Bulls, embarked on an annual two-week road trip in mid-November dating back to when both teams inhabited Chicago Stadium. The Wirtz Family, who at one point owned the Blackhawks, Bulls, and Chicago Stadium, would lease the venue to circus acts and ice skating troupes. The Blackhawks played between six and seven games in western Canada and California during this time. In November 2016, the Ringling Bros. and Barnum & Bailey Circus announced they would not return to the United Center in 2017. As a result, Disney on Ice performed its last two week show in 2017 before being condensed to one week in 2018.

== Media and announcers ==
For the first time in team history, all 82 games plus playoffs were broadcast on television during the 2008–09 season. At least 20 of them aired on WGN-TV (Channel 9), the first time the Blackhawks had been seen on local over-the-air television in 30 years. Games produced by WGN-TV through its WGN Sports department are not available in its superstation feed WGN America due to league broadcast rights restrictions. Other games not broadcast by WGN-TV are aired on NBC Sports Chicago, the first time in at least 35 years that non-nationally broadcast home games were seen locally, either over-the-air or on cable. On February 15, 2011, it was announced that the team had renewed their broadcast contract with WGN-TV for the next five years, starting in the 2011–12 NHL season. The deal was further extended for three more years on May 15, 2014, keeping the team on Channel 9 until the end of the 2018–19 season. On January 2, 2019, the Blackhawks (along with the Chicago Bulls and Chicago White Sox) agreed to an exclusive multi-year deal with NBC Sports Chicago beginning with the 2019–20 season, ending the team's broadcasts on WGN-TV. On June 5, 2024, the Blackhawks, Bulls, and White Sox announced they would join the newly established Chicago Sports Network.

Radio broadcasts since the 1970s and into the mid-2000s varied between WBBM (780) and WMAQ/WSCR (670). Both frequencies are 50,000-watt clear channel stations that allowed the Blackhawks to be heard across the country at night, but Blackhawks games often came into conflict with White Sox baseball by the start of April. On April 30, 2008, the team signed a three-year deal with WGN Radio (720 AM), another 50,000-watt station, with games airing alternately instead on WIND (560 AM) in scheduling conflict situations during the baseball season due to the Cubs having contractual preference to air on WGN; these moved to WGWG-LP (Channel 6/87.7 FM, an analog television station carrying an audio-only sports talk format using a quirk in the FM band) in mid-2014 when Tribune began a local marketing agreement with that station's owner. During the 2010 Stanley Cup Final, the Cubs agreed to allow the Blackhawks games to be broadcast on WGN and have the Cubs revert to WIND when there was a conflict. This allowed the Cup Final's games to be heard over a larger area due to WGN's clear-channel signal. All Blackhawk games are also streamed live on wgnradio.com, regardless of whether the games are on WGN or WGWG-LP. WLUP-FM (97.9 FM) was also utilized as an alternate station.

As of the 2024–25 season, Rick Ball and John Wiedeman call play-by-play on television and radio, respectively. Darren Pang and Troy Murray serve as the TV and radio color commentator respectively, with Caley Chelios providing occasional game analysis and other content on various media.

== Season-by-season record ==
This is a partial list of the last five seasons completed by the Blackhawks. For the full season-by-season history, see List of Chicago Blackhawks seasons.

Note: GP = Games played, W = Wins, L = Losses, T = Ties, OTL = Overtime losses, Pts = Points, GF = Goals for, GA = Goals against

| Season | GP | W | L | OTL | Pts | GF | GA | Finish | Playoffs |
|---|---|---|---|---|---|---|---|---|---|
| 2021–22 | 82 | 28 | 42 | 12 | 68 | 219 | 291 | 7th, Central | Did not qualify |
| 2022–23 | 82 | 26 | 49 | 7 | 59 | 204 | 301 | 8th, Central | Did not qualify |
| 2023–24 | 82 | 23 | 53 | 6 | 52 | 179 | 290 | 8th, Central | Did not qualify |
| 2024–25 | 82 | 25 | 46 | 11 | 61 | 226 | 296 | 8th, Central | Did not qualify |
| 2025–26 | 82 | 29 | 39 | 14 | 72 | 213 | 275 | 8th, Central | Did not qualify |

== Players and personnel ==
=== Current roster ===
Updated November 15, 2026

| No. | Nat | Player | Pos | S/G | Age | Acquired | Birthplace |
|---|---|---|---|---|---|---|---|
| 98 | (Canada) | Connor Bedard (C) | C | R | 21 | 2023 | North Vancouver, British Columbia |
| 59 | (Canada) | Tyler Bertuzzi (A) | LW | L | 31 | 2024 | Sudbury, Ontario |
| 36 | (Canada) | Dillon Boucher | LW | L | 29 | 2026 | Head of Chezzetcook, Nova Scotia |
| 24 | (Canada) | Bowen Byram | D | L | 25 | 2026 | Cranbrook, British Columbia |
| 28 | (United States) | Ian Cole | D | L | 37 | 2026 | Ann Arbor, Michigan |
| 33 | (United States) | Drew Commesso | G | L | 24 | 2020 | Norwell, Massachusetts |
| 38 | (Canada) | Ethan Del Mastro | D | L | 23 | 2021 | Burlington, Ontario |
| 8 | (United States) | Ryan Donato | C | L | 30 | 2023 | Scituate, Massachusetts |
| 16 | (Sweden) | Anton Frondell | C | L | 19 | 2025 | Trångsund, Sweden |
| 20 | (Canada) | Ryan Greene | C | R | 23 | 2022 | St. John's, Newfoundland and Labrador |
| 12 | (United States) | Jordan Greenway | LW | L | 29 | 2026 | Canton, New York |
| 44 | (United States) | Wyatt Kaiser | D | L | 24 | 2020 | Andover, Minnesota |
| 88 | (United States) | Patrick Kane (A) | RW | L | 38 | 2026 | Buffalo, New York |
| 80 | (Russia) | Roman Kantserov | RW | L | 22 | 2023 | Magnitogorsk, Russia |
| 30 | (United States) | Spencer Knight | G | L | 25 | 2025 | Darien, Connecticut |
| 14 | (Canada) | Kevin Korchinski | D | L | 22 | 2022 | Saskatoon, Saskatchewan |
| 55 | (Belarus) | Artyom Levshunov | D | R | 21 | 2024 | Zhlobin, Belarus |
| 26 | (Canada) | Andrew Mangiapane | LW | L | 30 | 2026 | Toronto, Ontario |
| 11 | (United States) | Oliver Moore | C | L | 21 | 2023 | Mounds View, Minnesota |
| 91 | (United States) | Frank Nazar | C | R | 22 | 2022 | Mount Clemens, Michigan |
| 6 | (United States) | Sam Rinzel | D | R | 22 | 2022 | Chanhassen, Minnesota |
| 22 | (United States) | Cole Smith | LW | L | 31 | 2026 | Brainerd, Minnesota |
| 86 | (Finland) | Teuvo Teräväinen | C | L | 32 | 2024 | Helsinki, Finland |
| 72 | (United States) | Alex Vlasic | D | L | 25 | 2019 | Wilmette, Illinois |

=== Retired numbers ===
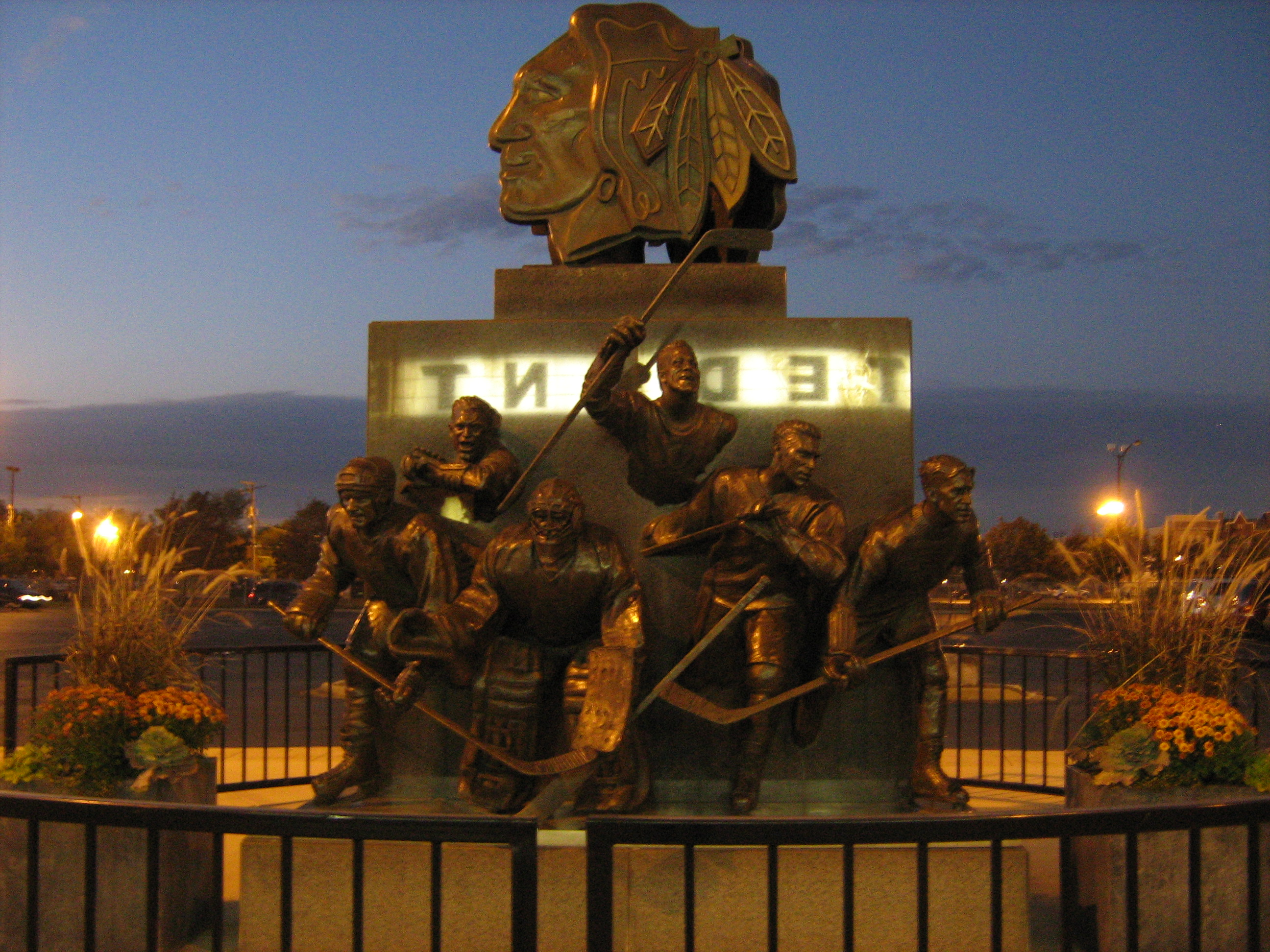
The Blackhawks unveiled a 75th anniversary monument named "Badge of Honor" in 2000.

Chicago Blackhawks retired numbers
| No. | Player | Position | Career | No. retirement |
|---|---|---|---|---|
| 1 | Glenn Hall | G | 1957–1967 | November 20, 1988 |
| 3 | Keith Magnuson ^{1} | D | 1969–1980 | November 12, 2008 |
| 3 | Pierre Pilote ^{1} | D | 1955–1968 | November 12, 2008 |
| 7 | Chris Chelios | D | 1990–1999 | February 25, 2024 |
| 9 | Bobby Hull | LW | 1957–1972 | December 18, 1983 |
| 18 | Denis Savard | C | 1980–1990; 1995–1997 | March 19, 1998 |
| 21 | Stan Mikita | C | 1958–1980 | October 19, 1980 |
| 35 | Tony Esposito | G | 1969–1984 | November 20, 1988 |
| 81 | Marián Hossa | RW | 2009–2017 | November 20, 2022 |

Notes:

- ^{1} Both players who wore No. 3 were honored.
- The NHL retired Wayne Gretzky's No. 99 for all its member teams at the 2000 NHL All-Star Game.

=== Hockey Hall of Fame ===
The Chicago Blackhawks acknowledge an affiliation with a number of inductees to the Hockey Hall of Fame, including 42 former players and 10 builders of the sport. The 10 individuals recognized as builders by the Hall of Fame include former Blackhawks executives, general managers, head coaches, and owners. In addition to players and builders, the team recognizes an affiliation with three broadcasters who were awarded the Foster Hewitt Memorial Award from the Hockey Hall of Fame. Lloyd Pettit, a sportscaster, was the first Blackhawks broadcaster to receive the award, in 1986. Other Blackhawks broadcasters awarded the Foster Hewitt Memorial Award include Pat Foley (awarded in 2014). In 2016, team historian Bob Verdi was awarded the Elmer Ferguson Memorial Award.

Players

- Sid Abel
- Ed Belfour
- Doug Bentley
- Max Bentley
- Georges Boucher
- Frank Brimsek
- Chris Chelios
- Paul Coffey
- Lionel Conacher
- Roy Conacher
- Art Coulter
- Babe Dye
- Phil Esposito
- Tony Esposito
- Bill Gadsby
- Charlie Gardiner
- Doug Gilmour
- Michel Goulet
- Glenn Hall
- Marián Hossa
- Bobby Hull
- George Hay
- Dick Irvin
- Duke Keats
- Duncan Keith
- Hugh Lehman
- Ted Lindsay
- Harry Lumley
- Mickey MacKay
- Stan Mikita
- Howie Morenz
- Bill Mosienko
- Bert Olmstead
- Bobby Orr
- Pierre Pilote
- Jeremy Roenick
- Denis Savard
- Earl Seibert
- Clint Smith
- Allan Stanley
- John Stewart
- Harry Watson
- Doug Wilson

Builders

- Al Arbour
- Tommy Ivan
- John Mariucci
- Frederic McLaughlin
- James D. Norris
- James E. Norris
- Rudy Pilous
- Bud Poile
- Arthur Wirtz
- Bill Wirtz

=== Team captains ===
- Dick Irvin, 1926–1929
- Duke Dukowski, 1929–1930
- Ty Arbour, 1930–1931
- Marvin Wentworth, 1931–1932
- Helge Bostrom, 1932
- Ted Graham, 1933
- Charlie Gardiner, 1933–1934
- Johnny Gottselig, 1935–1940
- Earl Seibert, 1940–1942
- Doug Bentley, 1942–1944
- Clint Smith, 1944–1945
- John Mariucci, 1945–1946
- Red Hamill, 1946–1947
- John Mariucci, 1947–1948
- Gaye Stewart, 1948–1949
- Doug Bentley, 1949–1950
- Jack Stewart, 1950–1952
- Bill Gadsby, 1952–1954
- Gus Mortson, 1954–1957
- Ed Litzenberger, 1958–1961
- Pierre Pilote, 1961–1968
- Pat Stapleton, 1969–1970
- Pit Martin and Stan Mikita, 1975–1977
- Keith Magnuson, 1977–1979
- Terry Ruskowski, 1979–1982
- Darryl Sutter, 1982–1985
- Bob Murray, 1985–1986
- Darryl Sutter, 1986–1987
- Denis Savard, 1988–1989
- Dirk Graham, 1989–1995
- Chris Chelios, 1995–1999
- Doug Gilmour, 1999–2000
- Tony Amonte, 2000–2002
- Alexei Zhamnov, 2002–2004
- Adrian Aucoin and Martin Lapointe, 2005–2007
- Jonathan Toews, 2008–2023
- Nick Foligno, 2024–2026
- Connor Bedard, 2026–present

=== Blackhawks Hall of Fame ===
In April 2026, the team formally held an induction ceremony for their newly christened team Hall of Fame. Twelve people were inducted as part of the first class, with future classes inducting two alumni, for which fans, players, and media will vote on nominees.

- Duncan Keith
- Steve Larmer
- Chris Chelios
- Tony Esposito
- Glenn Hall
- Marián Hossa
- Bobby Hull
- Keith Magnuson
- Stan Mikita
- Pierre Pilote
- Denis Savard
- Troy Murray

== Franchise leaders ==
=== Scoring leaders ===
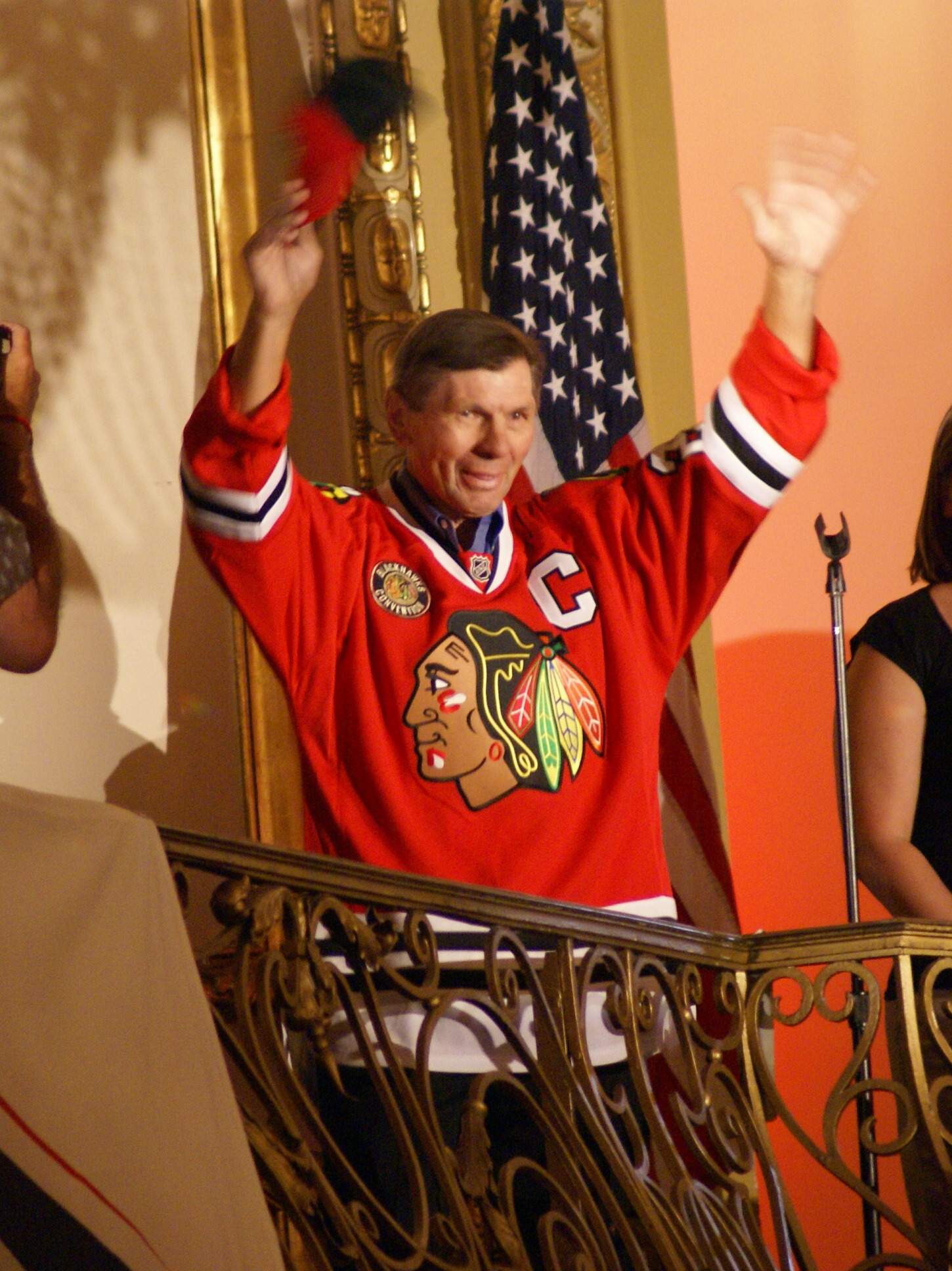
Stan Mikita is the Blackhawks all-time leading scorer with 1,467 career points.

These are the top-ten point-scorers in franchise regular season history. Figures are updated after each completed NHL regular season.

- * – current Blackhawks player

Note: Pos = Position; GP = Games played; G = Goals; A = Assists; Pts = Points; P/G = Points per game

Points
| Player | Pos | GP | G | A | Pts | P/G |
|---|---|---|---|---|---|---|
| Stan Mikita | C | 1,396 | 541 | 926 | 1,467 | 1.05 |
| Patrick Kane* | RW | 1,161 | 446 | 779 | 1,225 | 1.06 |
| Bobby Hull | LW | 1,036 | 604 | 549 | 1,153 | 1.11 |
| Denis Savard | C | 881 | 377 | 719 | 1,096 | 1.24 |
| Steve Larmer | RW | 891 | 406 | 517 | 923 | 1.04 |
| Jonathan Toews | C | 1,067 | 372 | 511 | 883 | .83 |
| Doug Wilson | D | 938 | 225 | 554 | 779 | .83 |
| Dennis Hull | LW | 904 | 298 | 342 | 640 | .71 |
| Pit Martin | C | 740 | 243 | 384 | 627 | .85 |
| Duncan Keith | D | 1,192 | 105 | 520 | 625 | .52 |

Goals
| Player | Pos | G |
|---|---|---|
| Bobby Hull | LW | 604 |
| Stan Mikita | C | 541 |
| Patrick Kane* | RW | 446 |
| Steve Larmer | RW | 406 |
| Denis Savard | C | 377 |
| Jonathan Toews | C | 372 |
| Dennis Hull | LW | 298 |
| Tony Amonte | RW | 268 |
| Jeremy Roenick | C | 267 |
| Bill Mosienko | RW | 258 |

Assists
| Player | Pos | A |
|---|---|---|
| Stan Mikita | C | 926 |
| Patrick Kane* | RW | 779 |
| Denis Savard | C | 719 |
| Doug Wilson | D | 554 |
| Bobby Hull | LW | 549 |
| Duncan Keith | D | 520 |
| Steve Larmer | RW | 517 |
| Jonathan Toews | C | 511 |
| Pierre Pilote | D | 400 |
| Chris Chelios | D | 395 |

=== Goaltending leaders ===
These are the top-ten goaltenders in franchise history by wins. Figures are updated after each completed NHL regular season.

- * – current Blackhawks player

Note: GP = Games played; W = Wins; L = Losses; T/O = Ties/Overtime losses; GA = Goal against; GAA = Goals against average; SA = Shots against; SV% = Save percentage; SO = Shutouts

Goaltenders
| Player | GP | W | L | T/O | GA | GAA | SA | SV% | SO |
|---|---|---|---|---|---|---|---|---|---|
| Tony Esposito | 873 | 418 | 302 | 148 | 2,529 | 2.93 | 26,905 | .906 | 74 |
| Glenn Hall | 618 | 276 | 229 | 107 | 1,586 | 2.60 | 18,816 | .916 | 51 |
| Corey Crawford | 488 | 260 | 162 | 53 | 1,146 | 2.45 | 13,924 | .918 | 26 |
| Ed Belfour | 415 | 201 | 138 | 56 | 1,047 | 2.65 | 10,809 | .903 | 30 |
| Jocelyn Thibault | 321 | 137 | 142 | 37 | 816 | 2.63 | 8,591 | .905 | 28 |
| Murray Bannerman | 288 | 116 | 125 | 33 | 1,051 | 3.84 | 8,777 | .880 | 8 |
| Mike Karakas | 331 | 114 | 165 | 52 | 982 | 2.90 | — | — | 28 |
| Charlie Gardiner | 316 | 112 | 151 | 52 | 664 | 2.02 | — | — | 42 |
| Nikolai Khabibulin | 206 | 91 | 80 | 25 | 557 | 2.84 | 5,702 | .902 | 6 |
| Denis DeJordy | 199 | 86 | 69 | 35 | 518 | 2.75 | 6,022 | .914 | 13 |

== See also ==
- List of Chicago Blackhawks award winners
- List of Chicago Blackhawks draft picks
- List of Chicago Blackhawks general managers
- List of Chicago Blackhawks head coaches

| Preceded by New York Rangers | Stanley Cup champions 1933–34 | Succeeded by Montreal Maroons |
| Preceded by Detroit Red Wings | Stanley Cup champions 1937–38 | Succeeded by Boston Bruins |
| Preceded by Montreal Canadiens | Stanley Cup champions 1960–61 | Succeeded by Toronto Maple Leafs |
| Preceded by Pittsburgh Penguins | Stanley Cup champions 2009–10 | Succeeded by Boston Bruins |
| Preceded by Los Angeles Kings | Stanley Cup champions 2012–13 | Succeeded by Los Angeles Kings |
| Preceded by Los Angeles Kings | Stanley Cup champions 2014–15 | Succeeded by Pittsburgh Penguins |
