= 1969–70 St. Louis Blues season =

National Hockey League team season

1969–70 St. Louis Blues
- West Division champions
- Division: 1st West
- 1969–70 record: 37–27–12
- Home record: 24–9–5
- Road record: 13–18–7
- Goals for: 224
- Goals against: 179

Team information
- General manager: Scotty Bowman
- Coach: Scotty Bowman
- Captain: Al Arbour
- Alternate captains: Jim Roberts; Jean-Guy Talbot; Red Berenson
- Arena: St. Louis Arena

Team leaders
- Goals: Red Berenson (33)
- Assists: Phil Goyette (49)
- Points: Phil Goyette (78)
- Penalty minutes: Barclay Plager (128)
- Wins: Jacques Plante (18)
- Goals against average: Ernie Wakely (2.11)

The 1969–70 St. Louis Blues season involved them finishing in first place in the West Division and being the only team in the West Division with a winning record for the second consecutive season, as they finished 22 points ahead of the second-placed Pittsburgh Penguins. The Blues matched their previous season's total of 37 wins but finished with 86 points, two points shy of the previous season's points total. NHL legend Camille Henry played his final game with the St. Louis Blues, notching 3 points in 4 games.

From a goaltending standpoint, the franchise experienced many changes. Glenn Hall had retired at the end of the 1968–69 season but returned. Despite an appearance in the All-Star Game, Jacques Plante played his final season in St. Louis. He was sold by the Blues to the Toronto Maple Leafs for cash on May 18, 1970. Ernie Wakely was acquired from the defending Stanley Cup champion Montreal Canadiens and became the Blues starting goaltender for the following season.

In the playoffs, St. Louis defeated the Minnesota North Stars 4–2 and the Pittsburgh Penguins 4–2 to advance to their third consecutive Stanley Cup Finals, where they were swept by the Boston Bruins. Phil Goyette became the first Lady Byng Trophy winner in franchise history as he led the team with 78 points. This would also mark the last time the Blues would make the finals until 2019, where they would again face the Bruins, and captured their first Stanley Cup in seven games.

== Offseason ==
=== NHL draft ===
Tommi Salmelainen was the first European drafted by an NHL franchise.

Round	Pick	Player	Nationality
2	19	Mike Lowe	Canada
3	30	Bernie Gagnon	Canada
4	42	Vic Teal	Canada
5	54	Brian Glenwright	Canada
6	66	Tommi Salmelainen	Finland
6	70	Dale Yutsyk	Canada
7	73	Bob Collyard	United States
7	77	David Pulkkinen	Canada
8	80	Patrick Lange	Canada
9	82	John Converse	Canada

== Regular season ==
=== Glenn Hall ===
As he did with the Chicago Black Hawks in 1966, Glenn Hall retired from St. Louis at the end of the 1968–69 season. He was talked into returning, usually with a promise of more money, but he didn't profess to enjoy his livelihood. Although Hall stayed in St. Louis, he still got nauseous before each game as he did earlier in his career.

=== Ernie Wakely ===
Ernie Wakely played two games for the Montreal Canadiens from 1962 to 1969. On June 27, 1969, Wakely got his big break when the Canadiens dealt the 28-year-old to the St. Louis Blues for Norm Beaudin and Bobby Schmautz. The 1969–70 season was a career season for Wakely. He appeared in 30 games for St. Louis, registering a 2.11 GAA and four shutouts.

Wakely had to take over from the legendary Glenn Hall. Wakely made the most of his opportunity as he helped lead the Blues to the Stanley Cup Finals. The Blues were defeated in four straight games by Bobby Orr's Boston Bruins.

=== Final standings ===
West Division
		GP	W	L	T	GF	GA	DIFF	Pts
1	St. Louis Blues	76	37	27	12	224	179	+45	86
2	Pittsburgh Penguins	76	26	38	12	182	238	−56	64
3	Minnesota North Stars	76	19	35	22	224	257	−33	60
4	Oakland Seals	76	22	40	14	169	243	−74	58
5	Philadelphia Flyers	76	17	35	24	197	225	−28	58
6	Los Angeles Kings	76	14	52	10	168	290	−122	38

=== Record vs. opponents ===
==== Vs. West Division ====
1969–70 NHL records
Team	LAK	MIN	OAK	PHI	PIT	STL	Total
Los Angeles	—	2–2–4	5–2–1	2–5–1	2–6	0–8	11–23–6
Minnesota	2–2–4	—	1–5–2	3–4–1	2–5–1	2–4–2	10–20–10
Oakland	2–5–1	5–2–1	—	2–3–3	3–2–3	2–4–2	14–16–10
Philadelphia	5–2–1	4–3–1	3–2–3	—	1–5–2	1–5–2	14–17–9
Pittsburgh	6–2	5–2–1	2–3–3	5–1–2	—	1–5–2	19–13–8
St. Louis	8–0	4–2–2	4–2–2	5–1–2	5–1–2	—	26–6–8

==== Vs. East Division ====
1969–70 NHL records
Team	BOS	CHI	DET	MTL	NYR	TOR	Total
Los Angeles	0–5–1	1–5	0–6	0–6	1–4–1	1–3–2	3–29–4
Minnesota	1–4–1	2–3–1	1–1–4	2–2–2	1–3–2	2–2–2	9–15–12
Oakland	0–5–1	3–3	2–4	2–3–1	1–5	1–4–1	9–24–3
Philadelphia	0–4–2	0–4–2	1–3–2	0–4–2	0–0–6	2–3–1	3–18–15
Pittsburgh	0–5–1	0–6	2–4	2–4	1–4–1	2–2–2	7–25–4
St. Louis	1–3–2	2–4	2–4	2–2–2	2–4	2–4	11–21–4

== Schedule and results ==
1969–70 regular season
October

Game	Result	Date	Score	Opponent	Record
1	W	October 11, 1969	7–2	Chicago Black Hawks (1969–70)	1–0–0
2	W	October 15, 1969	4–1	Los Angeles Kings (1969–70)	2–0–0
3	W	October 18, 1969	4–2	Minnesota North Stars (1969–70)	3–0–0
4	L	October 19, 1969	2–4	@ Detroit Red Wings (1969–70)	3–1–0
5	T	October 22, 1969	3–3	@ Montreal Canadiens (1969–70)	3–1–1
6	L	October 25, 1969	2–4	@ Toronto Maple Leafs (1969–70)	3–2–1
7	T	October 26, 1969	0–0	@ Philadelphia Flyers (1969–70)	3–2–2
8	T	October 30, 1969	2–2	Montreal Canadiens (1969–70)	3–2–3

November

Game	Result	Date	Score	Opponent	Record
9	W	November 1, 1969	8–0	Philadelphia Flyers (1969–70)	4–2–3
10	L	November 2, 1969	4–6	@ New York Rangers (1969–70)	4–3–3
11	T	November 5, 1969	4–4	@ Boston Bruins (1969–70)	4–3–4
12	W	November 6, 1969	5–2	@ Detroit Red Wings (1969–70)	5–3–4
13	L	November 8, 1969	2–5	@ Minnesota North Stars (1969–70)	5–4–4
14	W	November 13, 1969	4–0	Pittsburgh Penguins (1969–70)	6–4–4
15	L	November 15, 1969	2–3	Montreal Canadiens (1969–70)	6–5–4
16	L	November 16, 1969	2–4	@ New York Rangers (1969–70)	6–6–4
17	W	November 19, 1969	4–0	@ Pittsburgh Penguins (1969–70)	7–6–4
18	W	November 20, 1969	3–1	Minnesota North Stars (1969–70)	8–6–4
19	L	November 22, 1969	0–5	New York Rangers (1969–70)	8–7–4
20	W	November 26, 1969	4–1	Oakland Seals (1969–70)	9–7–4
21	W	November 29, 1969	3–1	Los Angeles Kings (1969–70)	10–7–4
22	L	November 30, 1969	1–3	@ Chicago Black Hawks (1969–70)	10–8–4

December

Game	Result	Date	Score	Opponent	Record
23	W	December 3, 1969	3–1	Oakland Seals (1969–70)	11–8–4
24	L	December 6, 1969	1–5	Detroit Red Wings (1969–70)	11–9–4
25	W	December 7, 1969	4–1	@ Philadelphia Flyers (1969–70)	12–9–4
26	T	December 10, 1969	3–3	@ Oakland Seals (1969–70)	12–9–5
27	W	December 13, 1969	8–1	@ Los Angeles Kings (1969–70)	13–9–5
28	W	December 16, 1969	6–4	Detroit Red Wings (1969–70)	14–9–5
29	T	December 18, 1969	3–3	Boston Bruins (1969–70)	14–9–6
30	W	December 20, 1969	3–0	Philadelphia Flyers (1969–70)	15–9–6
31	L	December 21, 1969	0–4	@ Chicago Black Hawks (1969–70)	15–10–6
32	W	December 23, 1969	5–3	Minnesota North Stars (1969–70)	16–10–6
33	W	December 26, 1969	3–1	Toronto Maple Leafs (1969–70)	17–10–6
34	L	December 27, 1969	1–4	@ Toronto Maple Leafs (1969–70)	17–11–6
35	W	December 30, 1969	5–0	@ Montreal Canadiens (1969–70)	18–11–6

January

Game	Result	Date	Score	Opponent	Record
36	W	January 3, 1970	6–0	Pittsburgh Penguins (1969–70)	19–11–6
37	T	January 7, 1970	2–2	Philadelphia Flyers (1969–70)	19–11–7
38	L	January 10, 1970	2–6	Chicago Black Hawks (1969–70)	19–12–7
39	L	January 14, 1970	2–5	@ Minnesota North Stars (1969–70)	19–13–7
40	W	January 15, 1970	2–0	Toronto Maple Leafs (1969–70)	20–13–7
41	W	January 17, 1970	3–1	Los Angeles Kings (1969–70)	21–13–7
42	W	January 22, 1970	4–3	New York Rangers (1969–70)	22–13–7
43	L	January 24, 1970	2–5	Detroit Red Wings (1969–70)	22–14–7
44	L	January 25, 1970	0–2	@ Philadelphia Flyers (1969–70)	22–15–7
45	W	January 28, 1970	6–1	@ Oakland Seals (1969–70)	23–15–7
46	W	January 29, 1970	3–2	@ Los Angeles Kings (1969–70)	24–15–7
47	L	January 31, 1970	1–2	@ Pittsburgh Penguins (1969–70)	24–16–7

February

Game	Result	Date	Score	Opponent	Record
48	L	February 4, 1970	0–1	@ Toronto Maple Leafs (1969–70)	24–17–7
49	L	February 6, 1970	1–2	Oakland Seals (1969–70)	24–18–7
50	L	February 8, 1970	1–7	@ Boston Bruins (1969–70)	24–19–7
51	L	February 11, 1970	2–3	Boston Bruins (1969–70)	24–20–7
52	L	February 12, 1970	2–5	@ Detroit Red Wings (1969–70)	24–21–7
53	W	February 14, 1970	2–1	Los Angeles Kings (1969–70)	25–21–7
54	T	February 15, 1970	3–3	@ Minnesota North Stars (1969–70)	25–21–8
55	W	February 18, 1970	5–2	Chicago Black Hawks (1969–70)	26–21–8
56	W	February 20, 1970	3–1	@ Oakland Seals (1969–70)	27–21–8
57	W	February 21, 1970	4–2	@ Los Angeles Kings (1969–70)	28–21–8
58	L	February 25, 1970	1–2	@ New York Rangers (1969–70)	28–22–8
59	W	February 28, 1970	3–2	@ Montreal Canadiens (1969–70)	29–22–8

March

Game	Result	Date	Score	Opponent	Record
60	L	March 1, 1970	1–3	@ Boston Bruins (1969–70)	29–23–8
61	W	March 4, 1970	3–1	Boston Bruins (1969–70)	30–23–8
62	W	March 6, 1970	3–1	New York Rangers (1969–70)	31–23–8
63	T	March 7, 1970	2–2	@ Pittsburgh Penguins (1969–70)	31–23–9
64	W	March 11, 1970	9–1	@ Minnesota North Stars (1969–70)	32–23–9
65	W	March 12, 1970	4–2	Philadelphia Flyers (1969–70)	33–23–9
66	L	March 14, 1970	2–6	Montreal Canadiens (1969–70)	33–24–9
67	T	March 17, 1970	5–5	Minnesota North Stars (1969–70)	33–24–10
68	W	March 19, 1970	3–1	Pittsburgh Penguins (1969–70)	34–24–10
69	L	March 21, 1970	0–2	Toronto Maple Leafs (1969–70)	34–25–10
70	L	March 22, 1970	0–1	@ Chicago Black Hawks (1969–70)	34–26–10
71	W	March 24, 1970	4–0	@ Los Angeles Kings (1969–70)	35–26–10
72	L	March 27, 1970	2–3	@ Oakland Seals (1969–70)	35–27–10
73	T	March 29, 1970	5–5	@ Pittsburgh Penguins (1969–70)	35–27–11

April

Game	Result	Date	Score	Opponent	Record
74	T	April 1, 1970	2–2	Oakland Seals (1969–70)	35–27–12
75	W	April 2, 1970	1–0	@ Philadelphia Flyers (1969–70)	36–27–12
76	W	April 4, 1970	3–1	Pittsburgh Penguins (1969–70)	37–27–12

Legend: Win (2 points) Loss (0 points) Tie (1 point)

== Playoffs ==
=== West Division semifinals ===
In the West Division playoffs, the St. Louis Blues ousted the Minnesota North Stars in six games. The Blues won the first two games at the St. Louis Arena. Game three at the Metropolitan Sports Center featured Gump Worsley's sharp goaltending and Bill Goldsworthy scoring two goals in a 4–2 win for the North Stars. Cesare Maniago played in goal for Minnesota in game four and picked up a 4–0 shutout, tying the series. Game five at St. Louis Arena was tied 3–3 when St Louis scored three goals in the third period by Red Berenson, Terry Gray and Jim Roberts, and the Blues won 6–3. In game six, Ab McDonald scored two goals as the Blues eliminated the North Stars by a score of 4–2.

=== Stanley Cup Finals ===
Boston Bruins vs. St. Louis Blues

Date	Visitors	Score	Home	Score	Notes
May 3	Boston	6	St. Louis	1	
May 5	Boston	6	St. Louis	2	
May 7	St. Louis	1	Boston	4	
May 10	St. Louis	3	Boston	4	OT

For the third consecutive year, the Blues were swept in the Stanley Cup Finals. This time, they faced the Boston Bruins, who, with stars like Bobby Orr and Phil Esposito, were more than a match for them. The first three games were not close. The Blues managed to force overtime in game four, but Orr scored his famous game-winning goal to end the series.

== Player statistics ==
=== Regular season ===
Scoring

Player	Pos	GP	G	A	Pts	PIM	PPG	SHG	GWG
Phil Goyette	C	72	29	49	78	16	13	0	5
Red Berenson	C	67	33	39	72	38	16	0	8
Frank St. Marseille	RW	74	16	43	59	18	3	0	1
Ab McDonald	LW	64	25	30	55	8	11	0	4
Gary Sabourin	RW	72	28	14	42	61	11	0	5
Tim Ecclestone	LW	65	16	21	37	59	5	0	2
Larry Keenan	LW	56	10	23	33	8	3	0	0
Bill McCreary	LW	73	15	17	32	16	2	1	1
Barclay Plager	D	75	6	26	32	128	1	1	1
Jim Roberts	D/RW	76	13	17	30	51	1	2	4
Ron Anderson	RW	59	9	9	18	36	0	0	0
Andre Boudrias	LW	50	3	14	17	20	1	0	2
Jean-Guy Talbot	D	75	2	15	17	40	0	1	0
Bob Plager	D	64	3	11	14	113	0	0	0
Terry Crisp	C	26	5	6	11	2	0	0	1
Terry Gray	RW	28	2	5	7	17	0	0	2
Ray Fortin	D	57	1	4	5	19	0	0	0
Noel Picard	D	39	1	4	5	88	1	0	0
Bill Plager	D	24	1	4	5	30	0	0	0
Norm Dennis	C	5	3	0	3	5	0	0	0
Wayne Maki	LW	16	2	1	3	4	0	0	1
Camille Henry	C	4	1	2	3	0	1	0	0
Al Arbour	D	68	0	3	3	85	0	0	0
Jacques Plante	G	32	0	2	2	0	0	0	0
Ron Buchanan	C	2	0	0	0	0	0	0	0
Gary Edwards	G	1	0	0	0	0	0	0	0
Glenn Hall	G	18	0	0	0	0	0	0	0
Jaroslav Jirik	LW	3	0	0	0	0	0	0	0
Ernie Wakely	G	30	0	0	0	0	0	0	0

Goaltending

= Indicates league leader

Player	MIN	GP	W	L	T	GA	GAA	SO
Jacques Plante	1839	32	18	9	5	67	2.19	5
Ernie Wakely	1651	30	12	9	4	58	2.11	4
Glenn Hall	1010	18	7	8	3	49	2.91	1
Gary Edwards	60	1	0	1	0	4	4.00	0
Team:	4560	76	37	27	12	178	2.34	10

=== Playoffs ===
Scoring

Player	Pos	GP	G	A	Pts	PIM	PPG	SHG	GWG
Ab McDonald	LW	16	5	10	15	13	3	0	0
Phil Goyette	C	16	3	11	14	6	1	0	2
Larry Keenan	LW	16	7	6	13	0	4	0	2
Frank St. Marseille	RW	15	6	7	13	4	3	0	1
Red Berenson	C	16	7	5	12	8	3	1	1
Bill McCreary	LW	15	1	7	8	0	0	0	0
Tim Ecclestone	LW	16	3	4	7	48	1	1	0
Jean-Guy Talbot	D	16	1	6	7	16	0	0	0
Andre Boudrias	LW	14	2	4	6	4	1	0	0
Gary Sabourin	RW	16	5	0	5	10	0	0	1
Terry Crisp	C	16	2	3	5	2	1	0	0
Jim Roberts	D/RW	16	2	3	5	29	0	0	0
Terry Gray	RW	16	2	1	3	4	1	0	1
Bob Plager	D	16	0	3	3	46	0	0	0
Noel Picard	D	16	0	2	2	65	0	0	0
Barclay Plager	D	13	0	2	2	20	0	0	0
Al Arbour	D	14	0	1	1	16	0	0	0
Ron Anderson	RW	1	0	0	0	2	0	0	0
Norm Dennis	C	2	0	0	0	2	0	0	0
Ray Fortin	D	3	0	0	0	6	0	0	0
Glenn Hall	G	7	0	0	0	0	0	0	0
Bill Plager	D	3	0	0	0	0	0	0	0
Jacques Plante	G	6	0	0	0	2	0	0	0
Ernie Wakely	G	4	0	0	0	0	0	0	0

Goaltending

Player	MIN	GP	W	L	GA	GAA	SO
Glenn Hall	421	7	4	3	21	2.99	0
Jacques Plante	324	6	4	1	8	1.48	1
Ernie Wakely	216	4	0	4	17	4.72	0
Team:	961	16	8	8	46	2.87	1

Note:

Pos = Position;GP = Games played; G = Goals; A = Assists; Pts = Points; PIM = Penalty minutes; +/- = Plus/minus; PPG = Power-play goals; SHG = Short-handed goals; GWG = Game-winning goals
Pos = Position;GP = Games played; Min, TOI = Minutes played; W = Wins; L = Losses; T,T/OT = Ties; OTL = Overtime losses; GA = Goals-against; GAA = Goals-against average; SO = Shutouts; SA = Shots against; SV = Shots saved;SV% = Save percentage;

== Awards and records ==
- Clarence S. Campbell Bowl
- Lady Byng Memorial Trophy: || Phil Goyette
- Jacques Plante, goaltender, NHL All-Star Game
