= 1969–70 Oakland Seals season =

NHL season

1969–70 Oakland Seals
- Division: 4th West
- 1969–70 record: 22–40–14
- Home record: 15–16–7
- Road record: 7–24–7
- Goals for: 169
- Goals against: 243

Team information
- General manager: Frank Selke Jr.
- Coach: Fred Glover
- Captain: Ted Hampson
- Alternate captains: Bill Hicke; Bert Marshall
- Arena: Oakland Coliseum Arena

Team leaders
- Goals: Carol Vadnais (24)
- Assists: Ted Hampson (35)
- Points: Ted Hampson (52)
- Penalty minutes: Carol Vadnais (212)
- Wins: Gary Smith (19)
- Goals against average: Gary Smith (3.11)

The 1969–70 Oakland Seals season was the Seals' third season in the NHL. They qualified for the Stanley Cup playoffs for the second year in a row, and were again eliminated in the first round. It was the last time the Seals qualified for the playoffs.

== Offseason ==
=== Amateur draft ===
Round	Pick	Player	Nationality	College/junior/club team
1	7.	Tony Featherstone	Canada	Peterborough Petes (OHA)
2	18.	Ron Stackhouse	Canada	Peterborough Petes (OHA)
3	29.	Don O'Donoghue	Canada	St. Catharines Black Hawks (OHA)
4	41.	Pierre Farmer	Canada	Shawinigan Bruins (QJHL)
5	53.	Warren Harrison	Canada	Sorel Black Hawks (QJHL)
6	65.	Neil Nicholson	Canada	London Knights (OHA)
7	76.	Pete Vipond	Canada	Oshawa Generals (OHA)

== Regular season ==
=== Final standings ===
West Division
		GP	W	L	T	GF	GA	DIFF	Pts
1	St. Louis Blues	76	37	27	12	224	179	+45	86
2	Pittsburgh Penguins	76	26	38	12	182	238	−56	64
3	Minnesota North Stars	76	19	35	22	224	257	−33	60
4	Oakland Seals	76	22	40	14	169	243	−74	58
5	Philadelphia Flyers	76	17	35	24	197	225	−28	58
6	Los Angeles Kings	76	14	52	10	168	290	−122	38

=== Record vs. opponents ===
==== Vs. West Division ====
1969–70 NHL records
Team	LAK	MIN	OAK	PHI	PIT	STL	Total
Los Angeles	—	2–2–4	5–2–1	2–5–1	2–6	0–8	11–23–6
Minnesota	2–2–4	—	1–5–2	3–4–1	2–5–1	2–4–2	10–20–10
Oakland	2–5–1	5–2–1	—	2–3–3	3–2–3	2–4–2	14–16–10
Philadelphia	5–2–1	4–3–1	3–2–3	—	1–5–2	1–5–2	14–17–9
Pittsburgh	6–2	5–2–1	2–3–3	5–1–2	—	1–5–2	19–13–8
St. Louis	8–0	4–2–2	4–2–2	5–1–2	5–1–2	—	26–6–8

==== Vs. East Division ====
1969–70 NHL records
Team	BOS	CHI	DET	MTL	NYR	TOR	Total
Los Angeles	0–5–1	1–5	0–6	0–6	1–4–1	1–3–2	3–29–4
Minnesota	1–4–1	2–3–1	1–1–4	2–2–2	1–3–2	2–2–2	9–15–12
Oakland	0–5–1	3–3	2–4	2–3–1	1–5	1–4–1	9–24–3
Philadelphia	0–4–2	0–4–2	1–3–2	0–4–2	0–0–6	2–3–1	3–18–15
Pittsburgh	0–5–1	0–6	2–4	2–4	1–4–1	2–2–2	7–25–4
St. Louis	1–3–2	2–4	2–4	2–2–2	2–4	2–4	11–21–4

== Playoffs ==
The Seals qualified for the playoffs and went against Pittsburgh in a best-of-seven quarterfinal series. They were swept in four games, or 0–4.

== Schedule and results ==
=== Regular season ===
1969–70 regular season
October

Game	Date	Score	Opponent	Record	Recap
1	October 11, 1969	2–2	@ Pittsburgh Penguins (1969–70)	0–0–1	T
2	October 12, 1969	2–1	@ Chicago Black Hawks (1969–70)	1–0–1	W
3	October 15, 1969	0–6	@ Boston Bruins (1969–70)	1–1–1	L
4	October 17, 1969	5–1	Los Angeles Kings (1969–70)	2–1–1	W
5	October 18, 1969	0–5	@ Los Angeles Kings (1969–70)	2–2–1	L
6	October 21, 1969	4–3	Pittsburgh Penguins (1969–70)	3–2–1	W
7	October 24, 1969	2–4	Boston Bruins (1969–70)	3–3–1	L
8	October 29, 1969	3–1	Chicago Black Hawks (1969–70)	4–3–1	W
9	October 31, 1969	1–3	Detroit Red Wings (1969–70)	4–4–1	L

November

Game	Date	Score	Opponent	Record	Recap
10	November 4, 1969	2–5	Toronto Maple Leafs (1969–70)	4–5–1	L
11	November 7, 1969	1–8	New York Rangers (1969–70)	4–6–1	L
12	November 9, 1969	2–2	@ Philadelphia Flyers (1969–70)	4–6–2	T
13	November 10, 1969	3–8	@ Boston Bruins (1969–70)	4–7–2	L
14	November 12, 1969	0–5	Montreal Canadiens (1969–70)	4–8–2	L
15	November 15, 1969	2–3	@ Chicago Black Hawks (1969–70)	4–9–2	L
16	November 19, 1969	4–2	@ Minnesota North Stars (1969–70)	5–9–2	W
17	November 22, 1969	2–4	@ Montreal Canadiens (1969–70)	5–10–2	L
18	November 23, 1969	2–5	@ New York Rangers (1969–70)	5–11–2	L
19	November 26, 1969	1–4	@ St. Louis Blues (1969–70)	5–12–2	L
20	November 29, 1969	3–5	@ Pittsburgh Penguins (1969–70)	5–13–2	L
21	November 30, 1969	1–0	@ Detroit Red Wings (1969–70)	6–13–2	W

December

Game	Date	Score	Opponent	Record	Recap
22	December 2, 1969	3–4	Los Angeles Kings (1969–70)	6–14–2	L
23	December 3, 1969	1–3	@ St. Louis Blues (1969–70)	6–15–2	L
24	December 5, 1969	2–2	Philadelphia Flyers (1969–70)	6–15–3	T
25	December 6, 1969	3–5	@ Los Angeles Kings (1969–70)	6–16–3	L
26	December 10, 1969	3–3	St. Louis Blues (1969–70)	6–16–4	T
27	December 12, 1969	4–1	Pittsburgh Penguins (1969–70)	7–16–4	W
28	December 17, 1969	3–1	Minnesota North Stars (1969–70)	8–16–4	W
29	December 19, 1969	0–4	Chicago Black Hawks (1969–70)	8–17–4	L
30	December 21, 1969	1–3	@ New York Rangers (1969–70)	8–18–4	L
31	December 25, 1969	1–3	@ Philadelphia Flyers (1969–70)	8–19–4	L
32	December 27, 1969	5–3	@ Minnesota North Stars (1969–70)	9–19–4	W
33	December 28, 1969	3–5	@ Detroit Red Wings (1969–70)	9–20–4	L
34	December 31, 1969	1–1	@ Toronto Maple Leafs (1969–70)	9–20–5	T

January

Game	Date	Score	Opponent	Record	Recap
35	January 3, 1970	1–5	@ Montreal Canadiens (1969–70)	9–21–5	L
36	January 4, 1970	2–5	@ New York Rangers (1969–70)	9–22–5	L
37	January 7, 1970	1–6	Boston Bruins (1969–70)	9–23–5	L
38	January 10, 1970	2–2	@ Philadelphia Flyers (1969–70)	9–23–6	T
39	January 11, 1970	3–6	@ Boston Bruins (1969–70)	9–24–6	L
40	January 13, 1970	1–3	Philadelphia Flyers (1969–70)	9–25–6	L
41	January 15, 1970	1–1	Minnesota North Stars (1969–70)	9–25–7	T
42	January 17, 1970	3–0	@ Montreal Canadiens (1969–70)	10–25–7	W
43	January 18, 1970	1–3	@ Chicago Black Hawks (1969–70)	10–26–7	L
44	January 21, 1970	3–3	@ Pittsburgh Penguins (1969–70)	10–26–8	T
45	January 23, 1970	6–3	Toronto Maple Leafs (1969–70)	11–26–8	W
46	January 25, 1970	4–1	@ Minnesota North Stars (1969–70)	12–26–8	W
47	January 28, 1970	1–6	St. Louis Blues (1969–70)	12–27–8	L
48	January 30, 1970	1–2	New York Rangers (1969–70)	12–28–8	L

February

Game	Date	Score	Opponent	Record	Recap
49	February 1, 1970	2–3	Detroit Red Wings (1969–70)	12–29–8	L
50	February 4, 1970	5–2	Montreal Canadiens (1969–70)	13–29–8	W
51	February 6, 1970	2–1	@ St. Louis Blues (1969–70)	14–29–8	W
52	February 7, 1970	1–5	@ Toronto Maple Leafs (1969–70)	14–30–8	L
53	February 11, 1970	2–1	Minnesota North Stars (1969–70)	15–30–8	W
54	February 13, 1970	4–2	New York Rangers (1969–70)	16–30–8	W
55	February 17, 1970	3–3	Boston Bruins (1969–70)	16–30–9	T
56	February 20, 1970	1–3	St. Louis Blues (1969–70)	16–31–9	L
57	February 21, 1970	6–3	Pittsburgh Penguins (1969–70)	17–31–9	W
58	February 25, 1970	1–4	@ Toronto Maple Leafs (1969–70)	17–32–9	L
59	February 26, 1970	1–7	@ Detroit Red Wings (1969–70)	17–33–9	L
60	February 28, 1970	2–3	@ Pittsburgh Penguins (1969–70)	17–34–9	L

March

Game	Date	Score	Opponent	Record	Recap
61	March 3, 1970	1–4	Toronto Maple Leafs (1969–70)	17–35–9	L
62	March 6, 1970	2–3	Chicago Black Hawks (1969–70)	17–36–9	L
63	March 7, 1970	3–5	@ Los Angeles Kings (1969–70)	17–37–9	L
64	March 8, 1970	2–2	Los Angeles Kings (1969–70)	17–37–10	T
65	March 11, 1970	2–2	Pittsburgh Penguins (1969–70)	17–37–11	T
66	March 15, 1970	2–1	Philadelphia Flyers (1969–70)	18–37–11	W
67	March 18, 1970	2–2	Montreal Canadiens (1969–70)	18–37–12	T
68	March 20, 1970	3–2	Detroit Red Wings (1969–70)	19–37–12	W
69	March 22, 1970	2–3	@ Philadelphia Flyers (1969–70)	19–38–12	L
70	March 24, 1970	2–2	@ Minnesota North Stars (1969–70)	19–38–13	T
71	March 25, 1970	3–2	Philadelphia Flyers (1969–70)	20–38–13	W
72	March 27, 1970	3–2	St. Louis Blues (1969–70)	21–38–13	W
73	March 29, 1970	3–8	Minnesota North Stars (1969–70)	21–39–13	L

April

Game	Date	Score	Opponent	Record	Recap
74	April 1, 1970	2–2	@ St. Louis Blues (1969–70)	21–39–14	T
75	April 3, 1970	4–1	Los Angeles Kings (1969–70)	22–39–14	W
76	April 4, 1970	1–4	@ Los Angeles Kings (1969–70)	22–40–14	L

Legend: W Win (2 points) L Loss (0 points) T Tie (1 point)

=== Playoffs ===
1970 Stanley Cup playoffs
Quarterfinals vs. (W2) Pittsburgh Penguins – Penguins win 4–0

Game	Date	Score	Opponent	Series	Recap
1	April 8, 1970	1–2	@ Pittsburgh Penguins	Penguins lead 1–0	L
2	April 9, 1970	1–3	@ Pittsburgh Penguins	Penguins lead 2–0	L
3	April 11, 1970	2–5	Pittsburgh Penguins	Penguins lead 3–0	L
4	April 12, 1970	2–3 OT	Pittsburgh Penguins	Penguins win 4–0	L

Legend: W Win L Loss

== Player statistics ==
=== Skaters ===
Note: GP = Games played; G = Goals; A = Assists; Pts = Points; PIM = Penalties in Minutes

		Regular season					Playoffs
Player	#	GP	G	A	Pts	PIM	GP	G	A	Pts	PIM
Ted Hampson	10	76	17	35	52	13	4	1	1	2	0
Earl Ingarfield	7	54	21	24	45	10	4	1	0	1	4
Carol Vadnais	5	76	24	20	44	212	4	2	1	3	15
Bill Hicke	9	69	15	29	44	14	4	0	1	1	2
Mike Laughton	15	76	16	19	35	39	4	0	1	1	0
Gary Jarrett	12	75	12	19	31	31	4	1	0	1	5
Doug Roberts	2	76	6	25	31	107	4	0	2	2	6
Gerry Ehman	8	76	11	19	30	8	4	1	1	2	0
Norm Ferguson	17	72	11	9	20	19	3	0	0	0	0
Harry Howell	3	55	4	16	20	52	4	0	1	1	2
Bert Marshall	19	72	1	15	16	109	4	0	1	1	12
Brian Perry	20	34	6	8	14	14	2	0	0	0	0
Dick Mattiussi	6	65	4	10	14	38	1	0	0	0	0
Don O'Donoghue	11	68	5	6	11	21	3	0	0	0	0
Bob Dillabough	21	52	5	5	10	16	4	0	0	0	0
Joe Hardy	14	23	5	4	9	20	4	0	0	0	0
Wayne Muloin	4	71	3	6	9	53	4	0	0	0	0
Howie Menard†	16	38	2	7	9	16	1	0	0	0	0
Gene Ubriaco‡	16	16	1	1	2	4	–	–	–	–	–
Tony Featherstone	18	9	0	1	1	17	2	0	0	0	0
Gary Smith	30	65	0	1	1	17	4	0	0	0	4
Neil Nicholson	25	–	–	–	–	–	2	0	0	0	0
Chris Worthy	25	1	0	0	0	2	–	–	–	–	–
Aut Erickson	4	1	0	0	0	0	–	–	–	–	–
Francois Lacombe	4	2	0	0	0	0	–	–	–	–	–
Barry Boughner	24	4	0	0	0	2	–	–	–	–	–
Charlie Hodge	1	14	0	0	0	0	–	–	–	–	–

†Denotes player spent time with another team before joining Seals. Stats reflect time with the Seals only. ‡Traded mid-season

=== Goaltenders ===
Note: GP = Games played; TOI = Time on ice (minutes); W = Wins; L = Losses; T = Ties; GA = Goals against; SO = Shutouts; GAA = Goals against average

		Regular season								Playoffs
Player	#	GP	TOI	W	L	T	GA	SO	GAA	GP	TOI	W	L	GA	SO	GAA
Gary Smith	30	65	3762	19	34	12	195	2	3.11	4	240	0	4	13	0	3.15
Charlie Hodge	1	14	738	3	5	2	43	0	3.49	–	–	–	–	–	–	–
Chris Worthy	25	1	60	0	1	0	5	0	5.00	–	–	–	–	–	–	–

== Transactions ==
The Seals were involved in the following transactions during the 1969–70 season:

=== Trades ===
June 19, 1969	To Oakland Seals Harry Howell	To New York Rangers cash
December 15, 1969	To Oakland Seals Howie Menard	To Chicago Black Hawks Gene Ubriaco

=== Additions and subtractions ===
Additions
Player	Former team	Via
Joe Hardy	Providence Reds (AHL)	free agency (1969–06)
Wayne Muloin	Providence Reds (AHL)	free agency (1969–06)

Subtractions
Player	New team	Via
