= 1969–70 Pittsburgh Penguins season =

NHL team season

1969–70 Pittsburgh Penguins
- Division: 2nd West
- 1969–70 record: 26–38–12
- Home record: 17–13–8
- Road record: 9–25–4
- Goals for: 182
- Goals against: 238

Team information
- General manager: Jack Riley
- Coach: Red Kelly
- Captain: Vacant
- Alternate captains: Keith McCreary; Duane Rupp; Ken Schinkel; Bob Woytowich
- Arena: Pittsburgh Civic Arena
- Average attendance: 6,998

Team leaders
- Goals: Dean Prentice (26)
- Assists: Michel Briere (32)
- Points: Dean Prentice (51)
- Penalty minutes: Bryan Watson (189)
- Wins: Al Smith (15)
- Goals against average: Joe Daley (2.95)

The 1969–70 Pittsburgh Penguins season was the franchise's third season in the National Hockey League (NHL). The season saw the Penguins qualify for the playoffs, for the first time in franchise history. The Penguins finished the season in second place in the West Division, 22 points behind the first place St. Louis Blues.

== Regular season ==
Tragedy struck the Penguins in 1970 when promising rookie center Michel Briere, who finished third in scoring on the team, was injured in a single-vehicle car crash in Quebec on May 15, 1970. His Mercury Cougar hit a frost bump and swerved off the road. It is not known if he was driving or not. Two friends who were in the vehicle with him suffered less serious injuries. After nearly spending a year in the hospital in a coma, Briere died of his head injuries. Given his junior league statistics, many hockey experts predicted that Briere would have been a star in the NHL.

=== Final standings ===
West Division
		GP	W	L	T	GF	GA	DIFF	Pts
1	St. Louis Blues	76	37	27	12	224	179	+45	86
2	Pittsburgh Penguins	76	26	38	12	182	238	−56	64
3	Minnesota North Stars	76	19	35	22	224	257	−33	60
4	Oakland Seals	76	22	40	14	169	243	−74	58
5	Philadelphia Flyers	76	17	35	24	197	225	−28	58
6	Los Angeles Kings	76	14	52	10	168	290	−122	38

=== Record vs. opponents ===
==== Vs. West Division ====
1969–70 NHL records
Team	LAK	MIN	OAK	PHI	PIT	STL	Total
Los Angeles	—	2–2–4	5–2–1	2–5–1	2–6	0–8	11–23–6
Minnesota	2–2–4	—	1–5–2	3–4–1	2–5–1	2–4–2	10–20–10
Oakland	2–5–1	5–2–1	—	2–3–3	3–2–3	2–4–2	14–16–10
Philadelphia	5–2–1	4–3–1	3–2–3	—	1–5–2	1–5–2	14–17–9
Pittsburgh	6–2	5–2–1	2–3–3	5–1–2	—	1–5–2	19–13–8
St. Louis	8–0	4–2–2	4–2–2	5–1–2	5–1–2	—	26–6–8

==== Vs. East Division ====
1969–70 NHL records
Team	BOS	CHI	DET	MTL	NYR	TOR	Total
Los Angeles	0–5–1	1–5	0–6	0–6	1–4–1	1–3–2	3–29–4
Minnesota	1–4–1	2–3–1	1–1–4	2–2–2	1–3–2	2–2–2	9–15–12
Oakland	0–5–1	3–3	2–4	2–3–1	1–5	1–4–1	9–24–3
Philadelphia	0–4–2	0–4–2	1–3–2	0–4–2	0–0–6	2–3–1	3–18–15
Pittsburgh	0–5–1	0–6	2–4	2–4	1–4–1	2–2–2	7–25–4
St. Louis	1–3–2	2–4	2–4	2–2–2	2–4	2–4	11–21–4

== Schedule and results ==
1969–70 regular season
October: 1–4–3 (home: 0–1–3; road: 1–3–0), 5 points

#	Date	Visitor	Score	Home	Location (Attendance)	Record	Points
1	Oct 11	Oakland Seals	2–2	Pittsburgh Penguins	Civic Arena (8,230)	0–0–1	1
2	Oct 15	Philadelphia Flyers	3–3	Pittsburgh Penguins	Civic Arena (3,010)	0–0–2	2
3	Oct 18	Boston Bruins	3–3	Pittsburgh Penguins	Civic Arena (5,572)	0–0–3	3
4	Oct 19	Pittsburgh Penguins	0–4	Boston Bruins	Boston Garden (14,831)	0–1–3	3
5	Oct 21	Pittsburgh Penguins	3–4	Oakland Seals	Oakland Coliseum Arena (2,812)	0–2–3	3
6	Oct 22	Pittsburgh Penguins	0–2	Los Angeles Kings	The Forum (5,558)	0–3–3	3
7	Oct 25	Pittsburgh Penguins	4–1	Minnesota North Stars	Met Center (14,877)	1–3–3	5
8	Oct 29	New York Rangers	3–1	Pittsburgh Penguins	Civic Arena (4,081)	1–4–3	5

November: 5–6–2 (home: 4–3–0; road: 1–3–2), 12 points

#	Date	Visitor	Score	Home	Location (Attendance)	Record	Points
9	Nov 1	Minnesota North Stars	3–6	Pittsburgh Penguins	Civic Arena (5,595)	2–4–3	7
10	Nov 2	Pittsburgh Penguins	3–4	Detroit Red Wings	Olympia Stadium (12,787)	2–5–3	7
11	Nov 5	Detroit Red Wings	4–2	Pittsburgh Penguins	Civic Arena (-)	2–6–3	7
12	Nov 8	Chicago Black Hawks	4–1	Pittsburgh Penguins	Civic Arena (6,727)	2–7–3	7
13	Nov 12	Pittsburgh Penguins	3–0	Toronto Maple Leafs	Maple Leaf Gardens (16,320)	3–7–3	9
14	Nov 13	Pittsburgh Penguins	0–4	St. Louis Blues	St. Louis Arena (15,995)	3–8–3	9
15	Nov 15	Los Angeles Kings	1–3	Pittsburgh Penguins	Civic Arena (4,855)	4–8–3	11
16	Nov 19	St. Louis Blues	4–0	Pittsburgh Penguins	Civic Arena (4,297)	4–9–3	11
17	Nov 22	Philadelphia Flyers	3–5	Pittsburgh Penguins	Civic Arena (5,464)	5–9–3	13
18	Nov 23	Pittsburgh Penguins	2–3	Chicago Black Hawks	Chicago Stadium (16,666)	5–10–3	13
19	Nov 26	Pittsburgh Penguins	4–4	Minnesota North Stars	Met Center (14,159)	5–10–4	14
20	Nov 29	Oakland Seals	3–5	Pittsburgh Penguins	Civic Arena (6,765)	6–10–4	16
21	Nov 30	Pittsburgh Penguins	3–3	Philadelphia Flyers	The Spectrum (13,058)	6–10–5	17

December: 5–7–0 (home: 3–3–0; road: 2–4–0), 10 points

#	Date	Visitor	Score	Home	Location (Attendance)	Record	Points
22	Dec 3	Detroit Red Wings	1–2	Pittsburgh Penguins	Civic Arena (4,116)	7–10–5	19
23	Dec 6	Pittsburgh Penguins	0–5	Toronto Maple Leafs	Maple Leaf Gardens (16,449)	7–11–5	19
24	Dec 7	Toronto Maple Leafs	2–3	Pittsburgh Penguins	Civic Arena (7,310)	8–11–5	21
25	Dec 10	Pittsburgh Penguins	2–0	Los Angeles Kings	The Forum (5,366)	9–11–5	23
26	Dec 12	Pittsburgh Penguins	1–4	Oakland Seals	Oakland Coliseum Arena (4,760)	9–12–5	23
27	Dec 14	Pittsburgh Penguins	1–2	Boston Bruins	Boston Garden (14,831)	9–13–5	23
28	Dec 17	Montreal Canadiens	5–2	Pittsburgh Penguins	Civic Arena (6,381)	9–14–5	23
29	Dec 20	Boston Bruins	6–4	Pittsburgh Penguins	Civic Arena (7,858)	9–15–5	23
30	Dec 21	Pittsburgh Penguins	0–4	Philadelphia Flyers	The Spectrum (12,423)	9–16–5	23
31	Dec 26	Pittsburgh Penguins	3–2	New York Rangers	Madison Square Garden (IV) (17,250)	10–16–5	25
32	Dec 27	Chicago Black Hawks	3–0	Pittsburgh Penguins	Civic Arena (8,746)	10–17–5	25
33	Dec 31	Montreal Canadiens	2–4	Pittsburgh Penguins	Civic Arena (5,202)	11–17–5	27

January: 3–7–3 (home: 2–2–3; road: 1–5–0), 9 points

#	Date	Visitor	Score	Home	Location (Attendance)	Record	Points
34	Jan 3	Pittsburgh Penguins	0–6	St. Louis Blues	St. Louis Arena (16,566)	11–18–5	27
35	Jan 4	Toronto Maple Leafs	4–4	Pittsburgh Penguins	Civic Arena (7,966)	11–18–6	28
36	Jan 7	New York Rangers	5–3	Pittsburgh Penguins	Civic Arena (4,671)	11–19–6	28
37	Jan 8	Pittsburgh Penguins	1–3	Montreal Canadiens	Montreal Forum (16,006)	11–20–6	28
38	Jan 10	Detroit Red Wings	5–3	Pittsburgh Penguins	Civic Arena (9,471)	11–21–6	28
39	Jan 14	Pittsburgh Penguins	0–5	Chicago Black Hawks	Chicago Stadium (16,666)	11–22–6	28
40	Jan 17	Pittsburgh Penguins	0–4	Toronto Maple Leafs	Maple Leaf Gardens (16,471)	11–23–6	28
41	Jan 18	Pittsburgh Penguins	6–4	Philadelphia Flyers	The Spectrum (16,666)	12–23–6	30
42	Jan 21	Oakland Seals	3–3	Pittsburgh Penguins	Civic Arena (3,443)	12–23–7	31
43	Jan 24	Los Angeles Kings	2–4	Pittsburgh Penguins	Civic Arena (7,581)	13–23–7	33
44	Jan 25	Pittsburgh Penguins	1–3	Boston Bruins	Boston Garden (14,835)	13–24–7	33
45	Jan 28	Toronto Maple Leafs	4–4	Pittsburgh Penguins	Civic Arena (4,290)	13–24–8	34
46	Jan 31	St. Louis Blues	1–2	Pittsburgh Penguins	Civic Arena (9,679)	14–24–8	36

February: 8–5–0 (home: 5–1–0; road: 3–4–0), 16 points

#	Date	Visitor	Score	Home	Location (Attendance)	Record	Points
47	Feb 1	Pittsburgh Penguins	0–6	New York Rangers	Madison Square Garden (IV) (17,250)	14–25–8	36
48	Feb 4	Pittsburgh Penguins	7–5	Minnesota North Stars	Met Center (11,973)	15–25–8	38
49	Feb 7	Los Angeles Kings	1–3	Pittsburgh Penguins	Civic Arena (7,983)	16–25–8	40
50	Feb 8	Minnesota North Stars	3–6	Pittsburgh Penguins	Civic Arena (7,954)	17–25–8	42
51	Feb 11	Pittsburgh Penguins	1–7	Chicago Black Hawks	Chicago Stadium (16,666)	17–26–8	42
52	Feb 14	Boston Bruins	3–0	Pittsburgh Penguins	Civic Arena (12,202)	17–27–8	42
53	Feb 15	Pittsburgh Penguins	4–2	Detroit Red Wings	Olympia Stadium (14,487)	18–27–8	44
54	Feb 17	Philadelphia Flyers	2–4	Pittsburgh Penguins	Civic Arena (7,494)	19–27–8	46
55	Feb 19	Pittsburgh Penguins	6–1	Los Angeles Kings	The Forum (5,298)	20–27–8	48
56	Feb 21	Pittsburgh Penguins	3–6	Oakland Seals	Oakland Coliseum Arena (6,135)	20–28–8	48
57	Feb 25	Pittsburgh Penguins	2–3	Montreal Canadiens	Montreal Forum (16,259)	20–29–8	48
58	Feb 26	Los Angeles Kings	0–1	Pittsburgh Penguins	Civic Arena (4,826)	21–29–8	50
59	Feb 28	Oakland Seals	2–3	Pittsburgh Penguins	Civic Arena (10,740)	22–29–8	52

March: 3–7–4 (home: 2–2–2; road: 1–5–2), 10 points

#	Date	Visitor	Score	Home	Location (Attendance)	Record	Points
60	Mar 4	Montreal Canadiens	1–2	Pittsburgh Penguins	Civic Arena (8,047)	23–29–8	54
61	Mar 5	Pittsburgh Penguins	3–5	Detroit Red Wings	Olympia Stadium (14,411)	23–30–8	54
62	Mar 7	St. Louis Blues	2–2	Pittsburgh Penguins	Civic Arena (12,881)	23–30–9	55
63	Mar 8	Pittsburgh Penguins	0–0	New York Rangers	Madison Square Garden (IV) (17,250)	23–30–10	56
64	Mar 11	Pittsburgh Penguins	2–2	Oakland Seals	Oakland Coliseum Arena (3,775)	23–30–11	57
65	Mar 12	Pittsburgh Penguins	1–4	Los Angeles Kings	The Forum (6,027)	23–31–11	57
66	Mar 14	Pittsburgh Penguins	3–6	Minnesota North Stars	Met Center (14,833)	23–32–11	57
67	Mar 18	New York Rangers	2–0	Pittsburgh Penguins	Civic Arena (7,551)	23–33–11	57
68	Mar 19	Pittsburgh Penguins	1–3	St. Louis Blues	St. Louis Arena (16,336)	23–34–11	57
69	Mar 21	Chicago Black Hawks	5–3	Pittsburgh Penguins	Civic Arena (12,103)	23–35–11	57
70	Mar 22	Pittsburgh Penguins	4–5	Montreal Canadiens	Montreal Forum (18,454)	23–36–11	57
71	Mar 25	Minnesota North Stars	0–2	Pittsburgh Penguins	Civic Arena (6,017)	24–36–11	59
72	Mar 28	Pittsburgh Penguins	2–1	Philadelphia Flyers	The Spectrum (14,606)	25–36–11	61
73	Mar 29	St. Louis Blues	5–5	Pittsburgh Penguins	Civic Arena (7,887)	25–36–12	62

April: 1–2–0 (home: 1–1–0; road: 0–1–0), 2 points

#	Date	Visitor	Score	Home	Location (Attendance)	Record	Points
74	Apr 1	Philadelphia Flyers	1–4	Pittsburgh Penguins	Civic Arena (7,984)	26–36–12	64
75	Apr 4	Pittsburgh Penguins	1–3	St. Louis Blues	St. Louis Arena (17,017)	26–37–12	64
76	Apr 5	Minnesota North Stars	5–1	Pittsburgh Penguins	Civic Arena (6,991)	26–38–12	64

Legend: Win (2 points) Loss (0 points) Tie (1 point)

== Playoffs ==
The Penguins reached the playoffs for the first time in 1970, advancing to the semifinals where they lost to the St. Louis Blues. In the Pittsburgh-Oakland series, in game one, Nick Harbaruk's goal midway through the third period was the winner as Pittsburgh won 2–1. In game two, Gary Jarrett gave Oakland a 1–0 lead, but Pittsburgh came back to win 3–1. Game three at Oakland featured a hat trick by Ken Schinkel of the Penguins as Pittsburgh won 5–2. Game four featured Oakland having 1–0 and 2–1 leads, but the Seals just couldn't hold on and the game was tied 2–2 at the end of regulation time. Overtime was necessary and Michel Briere scored the series winning goal at 8:28 of overtime for Pittsburgh. In the semifinals, the St. Louis Blues beat the Pittsburgh Penguins in six games.

1970 Stanley Cup playoffs
Quarterfinals vs Oakland: 4–0 (home: 2–0; road: 2–0)

#	Date	Visitor	Score	Home	Series
1	April 8	Oakland	1–2	Pittsburgh	1–0
2	April 9	Oakland	1–3	Pittsburgh	2–0
3	April 11	Pittsburgh	5–2	Oakland	3–0
4	April 12	Pittsburgh	3–2 OT	Oakland	4–0

Semifinals vs St. Louis Blues: 2–4 (home: 2–1; road: 0–3)

#	Date	Visitor	Score	Home	Series
1	April 19	Pittsburgh	1–3	St. Louis	0–1
2	April 21	Pittsburgh	1–4	St. Louis	0–2
3	April 23	St. Louis	2–3	Pittsburgh	1–2
4	April 26	St. Louis	1–2	Pittsburgh	2–2
5	April 28	Pittsburgh	0–5	St. Louis	2–3
6	April 30	St. Louis	4–3	Pittsburgh	2–4

Legend: Win Loss

== Player statistics ==
Skaters

Regular season
Player	GP	G	A	Pts	+/−	PIM
Dean Prentice	75	26	25	51	–20	14
Ken Schinkel	72	20	25	45	–26	19
Michel Brière	76	12	32	44	–15	20
Jean Pronovost	72	20	21	41	–2	45
Bob Woytowich	68	8	25	33	–12	49
Bryan Hextall Jr.	66	12	19	31	–22	87
Ron Schock	76	8	21	29	–7	40
Val Fonteyne	68	11	15	26	–4	2
Keith McCreary	60	18	8	26	–6	67
Glen Sather	76	12	14	26	–13	114
Wally Boyer	72	11	12	23	–5	34
Nick Harbaruk	74	5	17	22	–7	56
Jim Morrison	59	5	15	20	–20	40
Duane Rupp	64	2	14	16	–11	18
Tracy Pratt	65	5	7	12	–29	124
Bob Blackburn	60	4	7	11	–14	51
Bryan Watson	61	1	9	10	–1	189
Mike McMahon Jr.^{†}	12	1	3	4	2	19
Rick Kessell	8	1	2	3	0	0
Ron Snell	3	0	1	1	–2	0
George Swarbrick	12	0	1	1	0	8
Dunc McCallum	14	0	0	0	–4	16
Total		182	293	475	—	1,012

Playoffs
Player	GP	G	A	Pts	+/−	PIM
Michel Brière	10	5	3	8	0	17
Ron Schock	10	1	6	7	0	7
Jean Pronovost	10	3	4	7	0	2
Dean Prentice	10	2	5	7	0	8
Ken Schinkel	10	4	1	5	0	4
Duane Rupp	6	2	2	4	0	2
Keith McCreary	10	0	4	4	0	4
Dunc McCallum	10	1	2	3	0	12
Wally Boyer	10	1	2	3	0	0
Nick Harbaruk	10	3	0	3	0	20
Jim Morrison	8	0	3	3	0	10
Bob Woytowich	10	1	2	3	0	2
Glen Sather	10	0	2	2	0	17
Val Fonteyne	10	0	2	2	0	0
Tracy Pratt	10	0	1	1	0	51
Bryan Hextall Jr.	10	0	1	1	0	34
Bryan Watson	10	0	0	0	0	17
Bob Blackburn	6	0	0	0	0	4
Total		23	40	63	—	211

Goaltenders

Regular Season
Player	GP	W	L	T	GA	SO
Allan Smith	46	15	20	8	129	2
Les Binkley	27	10	13	1	79	3
Thomas Daley	9	1	5	3	26	0
Total		26	38	12	234	5

Playoffs
Player	GP	W	L	T	GA	SO
Les Binkley	7	5	2	0	15	0
Allan Smith	3	1	2	0	10	0
Total		6	4	0	25	0

^{†}Denotes player spent time with another team before joining the Penguins. Stats reflect time with the Penguins only.
^{‡}Denotes player was traded mid-season. Stats reflect time with the Penguins only.

== Awards and records ==
- Ken Schinkel became the first player to score 100 points for the Penguins. He did so by scoring a goal in a 2–3 loss to Chicago on November 23.
- Keith McCreary became the first player to score 50 goals for the Penguins. He did so with the first of his two goals in a 4–4 tie with Toronto on January 28.
- Bryan Watson became the first player to earn 100 penalty minutes in one season for the Penguins. He did so by receiving 26 PIMs in a 1–7 loss to Chicago on February 11.
- Ken Schinkel became the first to play 200 games for the Penguins. He did so in a 0–2 loss to New York on March 18.
- Michel Brière established a rookie record for the Penguins in terms of assists (32) and points (44).
- Bob Woytowich tied Noel Price's team record for points in a season by a defenseman with 33.

== Transactions ==
The Penguins were involved in the following transactions during the 1969–70 season:

=== Trades ===
June 12, 1969	To Montreal Canadiens 1969 8th round pick (Frank Hamill)	To Pittsburgh Penguins cash
June 12, 1969	To St. Louis Blues 1969 7th round pick (Bob Collyard)	To Pittsburgh Penguins cash
October 28, 1969	To Detroit Red Wings Billy Dea	To Pittsburgh Penguins Mike McMahon Jr.

=== Additions and subtractions ===
Additions
Player	Former team	Via
Nick Harbaruk	Vancouver Canucks (WHL)	Inter-League Draft (1969–06)
Bob Blackburn	New York Rangers	Intra-league draft (1969–06–11)
Dean Prentice	Detroit Red Wings	Intra-league draft (1969–06–11)
Glen Sather	Boston Bruins	Intra-league draft (1969–06–11)
Al Smith	Detroit Red Wings	Intra-league draft (1969–06–11)

Subtractions
Player	New team	Via
Noel Price	Springfield Kings (AHL)	Reverse Draft (1969–06–10)
Charlie Burns	Minnesota North Stars	Intra-league draft (1969–06–11)
Marv Edwards	Toronto Maple Leafs	Intra-league draft (1969–06–11)
Bill Speer	Boston Bruins	Intra-league draft (1969–06–11)

== Draft picks ==
Pittsburgh Penguins' picks at the 1969 NHL entry draft.

Round	#	Player	Pos	Nationality	College/Junior/Club team (League)
2	15	Rick Kessell	Center	Canada	Oshawa Generals (OHA)
3	26	Michel Briere	Center	Canada	Shawinigan
4	38	Yvon Labre	Defense	Canada	Toronto Marlboros (OHA)
5	50	Ed Patenaude	Right wing	Canada	Calgary Centennials (WCHL)
6	62	Paul Hoganson	Goaltender	Canada	Toronto Marlboros (OHA)

Draft notes

- The Pittsburgh Penguins' first-round pick went to the Boston Bruins as the result of a May 21, 1968, trade that sent Jean Pronovost and John Arbour to the Penguins in exchange for this pick.
- The Pittsburgh Penguins' seventh-round pick went to the St. Louis Blues as the result of a June 12, 1969, trade that sent cash options to the Penguins in exchange for this pick.
- The Pittsburgh Penguins' eighth-round pick went to the Montreal Canadiens as the result of a June 12, 1969, trade that sent cash options to the Penguins in exchange for this pick.
