= Doug Dunville =

Canadian hockey player

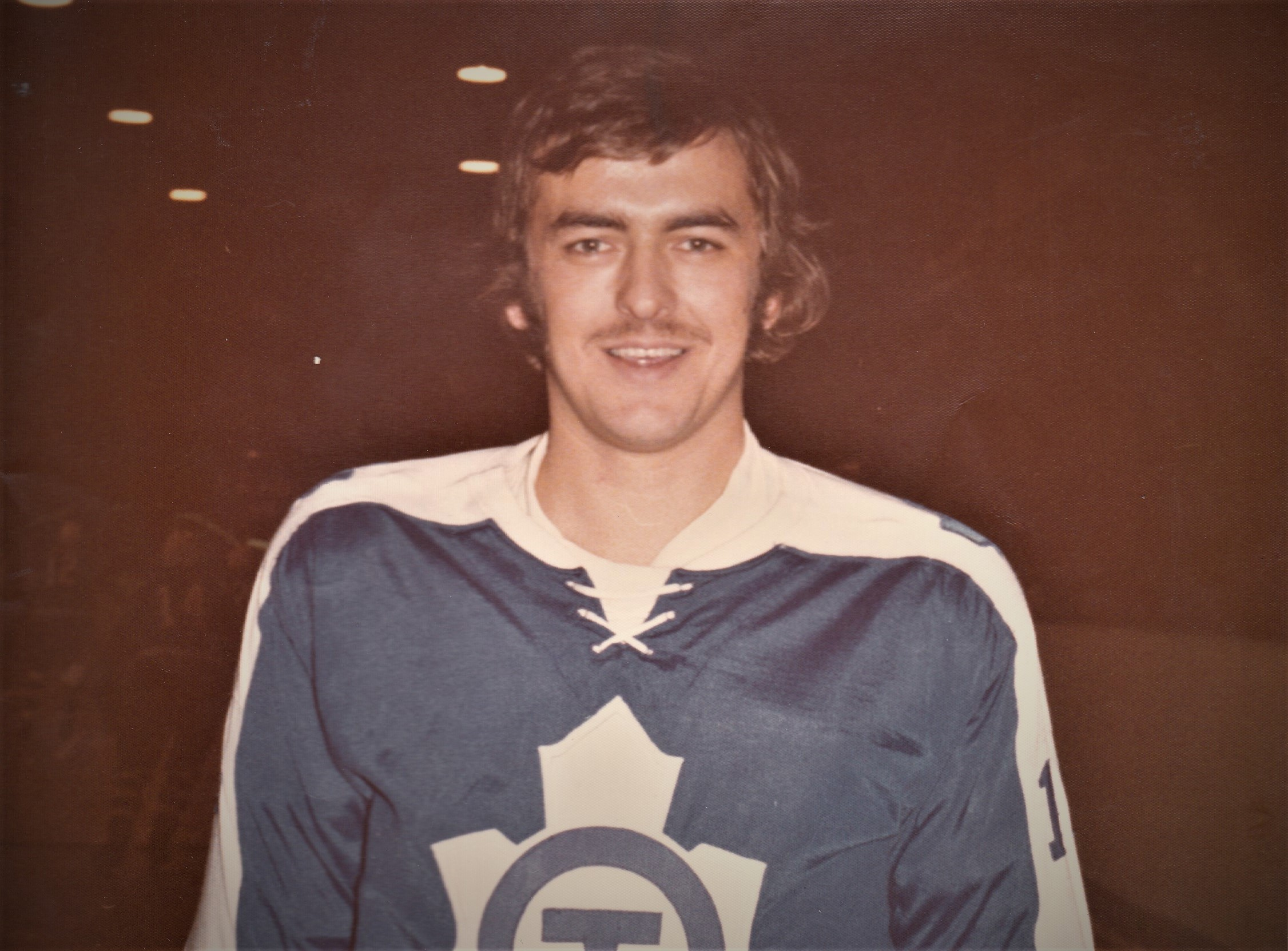
Doug Dunville in Orillia Terriers Jersey circa 1972

Doug (Dougie) Dunville 22 August 1945 - 08 September 2026.

Doug was a Canadian hockey player, born in Toronto, Ontario. He played defence and shoots right.

Doug was a member of the Toronto Marlboros, an OHA team that was bolstered by OHA All-stars Bobby Orr, Serge Savard, Jean Pronovost, Derek Sanderson and Don Marcotte that played the Soviet National Team on December 14, 1965. The Marlboro/OHA All-Stars took a 3-1 into the third period but lost the game 4-3.

Doug also played on the Ontario Selects team (Mark Howe, Marty Howe, Paulin Bordeleau, Glenn Goldup of the Toronto Marlboros; Tom Planic, Doug Kelcher, Gary Milroy, Keith Wright, Grant Moore, Mike Draper, Claire Alexander, Jim Keon and Jean Levasseur (Orillia Terriers), Darryl Sly, Corby Adams and Pat Monahan (Barrie Flyers), Henry Hank Monteith (Oakville Oaks), Sonny Pennington (Galt Hornets) and Bob Munro (University of Toronto Blues) that played the Moscow Selects December 10, 1972.

After the Toronto Marlboros (1964–66), Doug played in the AHL, CPHL, WHL and OHA Senior leagues.

== Career ==
								Playoffs					
Season	Team	League	GP	G	A	Pts	PiM		GP	G	A	Pts	PiM
1964-65	Toronto Marlboros	OHA	56	15	9	24	0		-	-	-	-	-
1965-66	Rochester Americans	AHL	1	0	0	0	0						
1965-66	Toronto Marlboros	OHA	48	8	21	29	137						
1965-66	Tulsa Oilers	CPHL							1	0	0	0	2
1966-67	Tulsa Oilers	CPHL	47	3	14	17	20						
1967-68	Phoenix Roadrunners (WHA)	WHL	70	5	20	25	57		4	1	0	1	8
1968-69	Phoenix Roadrunners (WHA)	WHL	55	3	17	20	45						
1969-70	Rochester Americans	AHL	3	0	0	0	2						
1969-70	Vancouver Canucks (WHL)	WHL	66	6	18	24	40		11	1	5	6	14
1970-71	Rochester Americans	AHL	58	6	14	20	50						
1971-72	Rochester Americans	AHL	64	8	17	25	52						
1972-73	Orillia Terriers (senior/intermediate hockey)	OHASr	31	3	10	13	15						
1973-74	Virginia Wings	AHL	3	0	0	0	2						

- Career Information as per Hockeydb.com
