= 1969–70 Detroit Red Wings season =

National Hockey League team season

1969–70 Detroit Red Wings
- Division: 3rd East
- 1969–70 record: 40–21–15
- Home record: 20–11–7
- Road record: 20–10–8
- Goals for: 246
- Goals against: 199

Team information
- General manager: Sid Abel
- Coach: Bill Gadsby, Sid Abel
- Captain: Alex Delvecchio
- Alternate captains: Gary Bergman; Bruce MacGregor
- Arena: Olympia Stadium
- Minor league affiliate: Fort Worth Wings (CHL)

Team leaders
- Goals: Garry Unger (42)
- Assists: Alex Delvecchio (47)
- Points: Gordie Howe (71)
- Penalty minutes: Gary Bergman (122)
- Wins: Roy Edwards (24)
- Goals against average: Roy Edwards (2.59)

The 1969–70 Detroit Red Wings season is noted as being Carl Brewer's comeback season in the NHL. Brewer was reunited with former Toronto Maple Leafs teammates Bob Baun, Pete Stemkowski, and Frank Mahovlich. Brewer signed a contract worth $120,000. Brewer was acquired back in March 1968. The Detroit Red Wings acquired Frank Mahovlich, Pete Stemkowski, Garry Unger and Brewer's rights from Toronto in exchange for Floyd Smith, Norm Ullman, and Paul Henderson. Another important aspect of the season was that Gordie Howe had finally learned how badly treated he was financially by Wings management. Howe was always under the impression that he was the highest paid player on the team. Howe discovered that Bobby Baun was making over $100,000 per season while Howe was paid only $45,000 per season. After this information, Howe confronted management and demanded that he received the appropriate compensation.

== Offseason ==
Former Red Wings' defenseman Doug Barkley was appointed as the head coach of the Fort Worth Wings of the Central Hockey League, which continued to be operated as Detroit's top farm team during the 1969–70 season.

=== NHL draft ===
Round	Pick	Player	Nationality	College/junior/club team
1	10	Jim Rutherford	Canada	Hamilton Red Wings (OHA)
2	21	Ron Garwasiuk	Canada	Regina Pats (SJHL)
3	33	Wayne Hawrysh	Canada	Flin Flon Bombers (WCHL)
4	45	Wayne Chernecki	Canada	Winnipeg Jets (WCHL)
5	57	Wally Olds	United States	Minnesota Golden Gophers (NCAA)

== Regular season ==
Two games into the season, Bill Gadsby was released from his coaching duties.

On February 21, 1970, Brewer had one of his best games of the season. In a contest against his former club, the Toronto Maple Leafs, Brewer had 2 assists in the game and was named the third star of the game.

=== Final standings ===
East Division
		GP	W	L	T	GF	GA	DIFF	Pts
1	Chicago Black Hawks	76	45	22	9	250	170	+80	99
2	Boston Bruins	76	40	17	19	277	216	+61	99
3	Detroit Red Wings	76	40	21	15	246	199	+47	95
4	New York Rangers	76	38	22	16	246	189	+57	92
5	Montreal Canadiens	76	38	22	16	244	201	+43	92
6	Toronto Maple Leafs	76	29	34	13	222	242	−20	71

=== Record vs. opponents ===
==== Vs. East Division ====
1969–70 NHL records
Team	BOS	CHI	DET	MTL	NYR	TOR	Total
Boston	—	3–3–2	1–2–5	2–3–3	4–4	4–3–1	14–15–11
Chicago	3–3–2	—	4–4	4–4	4–1–3	4–3–1	19–15–6
Detroit	2–1–5	4–4	—	4–2–2	2–4–2	6–2	18–13–9
Montreal	3–2–3	4–4	2–4–2	—	4–3–1	4–1–3	17–14–9
New York	4–4	1–4–3	4–2–2	3–4–1	—	6–2	18–16–6
Toronto	3–4–1	3–4–1	2–6	1–4–3	2–6	—	11–24–5

==== Vs. West Division ====
1969–70 NHL records
Team	LAK	MIN	OAK	PHI	PIT	STL	Total
Boston	5–0–1	4–1–1	5–0–1	4–0–2	5–0–1	3–1–2	26–2–8
Chicago	5–1	3–2–1	3–3	4–0–2	6–0	4–2	25–8–3
Detroit	6–0	1–1–4	4–2	3–1–2	4–2	4–2	22–8–6
Montreal	6–0	2–2–2	3–2–1	4–0–2	4–2	2–2–2	21–8–7
New York	4–1–1	3–1–2	5–1	0–0–6	4–1–1	4–2	20–6–10
Toronto	3–1–2	2–2–2	4–1–1	3–2–1	2–2–2	4–2	18–10–8

== Playoffs ==
The Red Wings made it into the playoffs for the first time since 1966 during this season. They lost the Quarter-finals; getting swept by Chicago in 4 games in a best of seven series, or 0–4.

== Schedule and results ==
1969–70 regular season
October

Game	Result	Date	Score	Opponent	Record
1	W	October 11, 1969	3–2	Toronto Maple Leafs (1969–70)	1–0–0
2	W	October 15, 1969	4–1	@ Chicago Black Hawks (1969–70)	2–0–0
3	L	October 16, 1969	2–3	Minnesota North Stars (1969–70)	2–1–0
4	W	October 19, 1969	4–2	St. Louis Blues (1969–70)	3–1–0
5	T	October 23, 1969	2–2	@ Philadelphia Flyers (1969–70)	3–1–1
6	L	October 25, 1969	1–4	New York Rangers (1969–70)	3–2–1
7	W	October 29, 1969	5–2	@ Los Angeles Kings (1969–70)	4–2–1
8	W	October 31, 1969	3–1	@ Oakland Seals (1969–70)	5–2–1

November

Game	Result	Date	Score	Opponent	Record
9	W	November 2, 1969	4–3	Pittsburgh Penguins (1969–70)	6–2–1
10	W	November 5, 1969	4–2	@ Pittsburgh Penguins (1969–70)	7–2–1
11	L	November 6, 1969	2–5	St. Louis Blues (1969–70)	7–3–1
12	W	November 8, 1969	3–2	Boston Bruins (1969–70)	8–3–1
13	L	November 12, 1969	2–4	@ New York Rangers (1969–70)	8–4–1
14	L	November 13, 1969	1–3	@ Boston Bruins (1969–70)	8–5–1
15	T	November 15, 1969	2–2	@ Minnesota North Stars (1969–70)	8–5–2
16	T	November 19, 1969	5–5	@ Montreal Canadiens (1969–70)	8–5–3
17	L	November 22, 1969	0–4	@ Toronto Maple Leafs (1969–70)	8–6–3
18	T	November 26, 1969	1–1	@ Philadelphia Flyers (1969–70)	8–6–4
19	W	November 27, 1969	5–1	Los Angeles Kings (1969–70)	9–6–4
20	W	November 29, 1969	5–4	Chicago Black Hawks (1969–70)	10–6–4
21	L	November 30, 1969	0–1	Oakland Seals (1969–70)	10–7–4

December

Game	Result	Date	Score	Opponent	Record
22	L	December 3, 1969	1–2	@ Pittsburgh Penguins (1969–70)	10–8–4
23	T	December 4, 1969	4–4	Boston Bruins (1969–70)	10–8–5
24	W	December 6, 1969	5–1	@ St. Louis Blues (1969–70)	11–8–5
25	L	December 7, 1969	1–5	@ Chicago Black Hawks (1969–70)	11–9–5
26	T	December 11, 1969	2–2	Minnesota North Stars (1969–70)	11–9–6
27	W	December 13, 1969	3–1	@ Toronto Maple Leafs (1969–70)	12–9–6
28	W	December 14, 1969	5–2	Montreal Canadiens (1969–70)	13–9–6
29	L	December 16, 1969	4–6	@ St. Louis Blues (1969–70)	13–10–6
30	W	December 20, 1969	3–2	@ Montreal Canadiens (1969–70)	14–10–6
31	L	December 21, 1969	0–3	Toronto Maple Leafs (1969–70)	14–11–6
32	T	December 26, 1969	3–3	Montreal Canadiens (1969–70)	14–11–7
33	W	December 28, 1969	5–3	Oakland Seals (1969–70)	15–11–7
34	W	December 31, 1969	5–1	Boston Bruins (1969–70)	16–11–7

January

Game	Result	Date	Score	Opponent	Record
35	W	January 3, 1970	6–1	@ Philadelphia Flyers (1969–70)	17–11–7
36	W	January 4, 1970	4–0	Chicago Black Hawks (1969–70)	18–11–7
37	L	January 7, 1970	0–7	@ Chicago Black Hawks (1969–70)	18–12–7
38	W	January 10, 1970	5–3	@ Pittsburgh Penguins (1969–70)	19–12–7
39	W	January 17, 1970	5–3	Philadelphia Flyers (1969–70)	20–12–7
40	W	January 18, 1970	3–1	Los Angeles Kings (1969–70)	21–12–7
41	L	January 22, 1970	3–4	Chicago Black Hawks (1969–70)	21–13–7
42	W	January 24, 1970	5–2	@ St. Louis Blues (1969–70)	22–13–7
43	L	January 25, 1970	1–4	Montreal Canadiens (1969–70)	22–14–7
44	W	January 29, 1970	4–3	Philadelphia Flyers (1969–70)	23–14–7
45	W	January 31, 1970	2–1	@ Los Angeles Kings (1969–70)	24–14–7

February

Game	Result	Date	Score	Opponent	Record
46	W	February 1, 1970	3–2	@ Oakland Seals (1969–70)	25–14–7
47	L	February 4, 1970	1–5	@ New York Rangers (1969–70)	25–15–7
48	W	February 5, 1970	4–1	Toronto Maple Leafs (1969–70)	26–15–7
49	T	February 7, 1970	2–2	@ Boston Bruins (1969–70)	26–15–8
50	L	February 8, 1970	3–5	Philadelphia Flyers (1969–70)	26–16–8
51	W	February 12, 1970	5–2	St. Louis Blues (1969–70)	27–16–8
52	W	February 14, 1970	5–2	@ Montreal Canadiens (1969–70)	28–16–8
53	L	February 15, 1970	2–4	Pittsburgh Penguins (1969–70)	28–17–8
54	T	February 18, 1970	1–1	@ Minnesota North Stars (1969–70)	28–17–9
55	T	February 19, 1970	3–3	New York Rangers (1969–70)	28–17–10
56	W	February 21, 1970	7–5	@ Toronto Maple Leafs (1969–70)	29–17–10
57	L	February 22, 1970	0–1	Montreal Canadiens (1969–70)	29–18–10
58	W	February 26, 1970	7–1	Oakland Seals (1969–70)	30–18–10
59	T	February 28, 1970	3–3	New York Rangers (1969–70)	30–18–11

March

Game	Result	Date	Score	Opponent	Record
60	W	March 4, 1970	2–0	@ New York Rangers (1969–70)	31–18–11
61	W	March 5, 1970	5–3	Pittsburgh Penguins (1969–70)	32–18–11
62	W	March 7, 1970	4–2	@ Montreal Canadiens (1969–70)	33–18–11
63	T	March 8, 1970	2–2	Minnesota North Stars (1969–70)	33–18–12
64	W	March 11, 1970	3–1	@ Toronto Maple Leafs (1969–70)	34–18–12
65	T	March 15, 1970	5–5	@ Boston Bruins (1969–70)	34–18–13
66	W	March 17, 1970	3–2	Los Angeles Kings (1969–70)	35–18–13
67	W	March 18, 1970	6–2	@ Minnesota North Stars (1969–70)	36–18–13
68	L	March 20, 1970	2–3	@ Oakland Seals (1969–70)	36–19–13
69	W	March 21, 1970	4–1	@ Los Angeles Kings (1969–70)	37–19–13
70	L	March 26, 1970	0–1	Chicago Black Hawks (1969–70)	37–20–13
71	T	March 28, 1970	5–5	@ Boston Bruins (1969–70)	37–20–14
72	T	March 29, 1970	2–2	Boston Bruins (1969–70)	37–20–15

April

Game	Result	Date	Score	Opponent	Record
73	W	April 1, 1970	5–2	@ Chicago Black Hawks (1969–70)	38–20–15
74	W	April 2, 1970	4–2	Toronto Maple Leafs (1969–70)	39–20–15
75	W	April 4, 1970	6–2	New York Rangers (1969–70)	40–20–15
76	L	April 5, 1970	5–9	@ New York Rangers (1969–70)	40–21–15

Legend: Win (2 points) Loss (0 points) Tie (1 point)

== Player statistics ==
=== Regular season ===
Scoring

Player	Pos	GP	G	A	Pts	PIM	PPG	SHG	GWG
Gordie Howe	RW	76	31	40	71	58	11	4	5
Frank Mahovlich	LW	74	38	32	70	59	15	1	5
Alex Delvecchio	C/LW	73	21	47	68	24	4	0	3
Garry Unger	C	76	42	24	66	67	12	0	4
Wayne Connelly	C	76	23	36	59	10	5	0	5
Pete Stemkowski	C	76	25	24	49	114	4	1	6
Nick Libett	LW	76	20	20	40	39	3	1	2
Carl Brewer	D	70	2	37	39	51	0	0	0
Bruce MacGregor	C	73	15	23	38	24	3	1	4
Gary Bergman	D	69	6	17	23	122	1	0	1
Ron Harris	D	72	2	19	21	99	0	0	0
Bob Baun	D	71	1	18	19	112	0	0	0
Al Karlander	C	41	5	10	15	6	0	0	0
Billy Dea	LW	70	10	3	13	6	0	0	3
Dale Rolfe	D	20	2	9	11	12	0	0	1
Garry Monahan	LW	51	3	4	7	24	0	0	1
Matt Ravlich	D	46	0	6	6	33	0	0	0
Poul Popiel	D	32	0	4	4	29	0	0	0
Gary Croteau	LW	10	0	2	2	2	0	0	0
Ed Hatoum	RW	5	0	2	2	2	0	0	0
Roy Edwards	G	47	0	1	1	0	0	0	0
Rick McCann	C	18	0	1	1	4	0	0	0
Roger Crozier	G	34	0	0	0	0	0	0	0
Gerry Hart	D	3	0	0	0	2	0	0	0
Mike McMahon	D	2	0	0	0	0	0	0	0
Hank Monteith	LW	9	0	0	0	0	0	0	0
Fred Speck	C	5	0	0	0	0	0	0	0
Jim Watson	D	4	0	0	0	0	0	0	0

Goaltending

Player	MIN	GP	W	L	T	GA	GAA	SO
Roy Edwards	2683	47	24	15	6	116	2.59	2
Roger Crozier	1877	34	16	6	9	83	2.65	0
Team:	4560	76	40	21	15	199	2.62	2

=== Playoffs ===
Scoring

Player	Pos	GP	G	A	Pts	PIM	PPG	SHG	GWG
Wayne Connelly	C	4	1	3	4	2	1	0	0
Gordie Howe	RW	4	2	0	2	2	1	0	0
Nick Libett	LW	4	2	0	2	2	1	0	0
Pete Stemkowski	C	4	1	1	2	6	0	1	0
Alex Delvecchio	C/LW	4	0	2	2	0	0	0	0
Dale Rolfe	D	4	0	2	2	8	0	0	0
Bruce MacGregor	C	4	1	0	1	2	0	0	0
Doug Volmar	RW	2	1	0	1	0	0	0	0
Gary Bergman	D	4	0	1	1	2	0	0	0
Billy Dea	LW	4	0	1	1	2	0	0	0
Al Karlander	C	4	0	1	1	0	0	0	0
Garry Unger	C	4	0	1	1	6	0	0	0
Bob Baun	D	4	0	0	0	6	0	0	0
Carl Brewer	D	4	0	0	0	2	0	0	0
Roger Crozier	G	1	0	0	0	0	0	0	0
Roy Edwards	G	4	0	0	0	0	0	0	0
Ron Harris	D	4	0	0	0	8	0	0	0
Frank Mahovlich	LW	4	0	0	0	2	0	0	0
Hank Monteith	LW	4	0	0	0	0	0	0	0
Poul Popiel	D	1	0	0	0	0	0	0	0

Goaltending

Player	MIN	GP	W	L	GA	GAA	SO
Roger Crozier	34	1	0	1	3	5.29	0
Roy Edwards	206	4	0	3	11	3.20	0
Team:	240	4	0	4	14	3.50	0

Note: GP = Games played; G = Goals; A = Assists; Pts = Points; +/- = Plus-minus PIM = Penalty minutes; PPG = Power-play goals; SHG = Short-handed goals; GWG = Game-winning goals;
MIN = Minutes played; W = Wins; L = Losses; T = Ties; GA = Goals against; GAA = Goals-against average; SO = Shutouts;

== Awards and records ==
- Carl Brewer, NHL Second Team All-Star
- Gordie Howe, NHL First Team All-Star
- Frank Mahovlich, NHL Second Team All-Star
