= 1969–70 Montreal Canadiens season =

NHL hockey team season

1969–70 Montreal Canadiens
- Division: 5th East
- 1969–70 record: 38–22–16
- Home record: 21–9–8
- Road record: 17–13–8
- Goals for: 244
- Goals against: 201

Team information
- General manager: Sam Pollock
- Coach: Claude Ruel
- Captain: Jean Beliveau
- Alternate captains: Henri Richard; Unknown
- Arena: Montreal Forum

Team leaders
- Goals: Jacques Lemaire (32)
- Assists: Yvan Cournoyer (36)
- Points: Yvan Cournoyer (63)
- Penalty minutes: John Ferguson (139)
- Wins: Rogie Vachon (31)
- Goals against average: Phil Myre (2.27)

The 1969–70 Montreal Canadiens season was the club's 61st season of play. The defending Stanley Cup champions finished sixteen games above .500, but it was not enough to return to the playoffs in the powerful East Division. Montreal finished fifth after losing tiebreaker to the New York Rangers on goals scored, and missed the playoffs for the first time since the 1947–48 season, ending their 21-season playoff streak.

This team was the only Canadiens team between the 1948–49 season and the 1993–94 season that missed the playoffs, a span of 46 years. Montreal would go on to win another Cup the following season, becoming the first (and, as of 2026, only) team to win the Stanley Cup, miss the playoffs, and win the Cup again in successive campaigns, and with their 1968 Stanley Cup victory, they are the only team to win the Stanley Cup in 3 of 4 years, with one missed playoff appearance.

== Regular season ==
On April 5, 1970 the Montreal Canadiens, in a desperate race to qualify for the NHL playoffs, the team played away against the Chicago Black Hawks. With 9:30 left in regulation time, Montreal was down by a score of 5–2. The Canadiens' only hope of qualifying for the playoffs was to score three more goals. Montreal coach Claude Ruel pulled his goaltender, Rogatien Vachon, from the net, sending him back out only for faceoffs. Unfortunately, luck ran out as Chicago scored five empty net goals and won the game by a score of 10–2, while the Rangers racked up a 9–5 win over Detroit. Thus, Montreal missed the playoffs for the first time in 22 years.

=== Final standings ===
East Division
		GP	W	L	T	GF	GA	DIFF	Pts
1	Chicago Black Hawks	76	45	22	9	250	170	+80	99
2	Boston Bruins	76	40	17	19	277	216	+61	99
3	Detroit Red Wings	76	40	21	15	246	199	+47	95
4	New York Rangers	76	38	22	16	246	189	+57	92
5	Montreal Canadiens	76	38	22	16	244	201	+43	92
6	Toronto Maple Leafs	76	29	34	13	222	242	−20	71

=== Record vs. opponents ===
==== Vs. East Division ====
1969–70 NHL records
Team	BOS	CHI	DET	MTL	NYR	TOR	Total
Boston	—	3–3–2	1–2–5	2–3–3	4–4	4–3–1	14–15–11
Chicago	3–3–2	—	4–4	4–4	4–1–3	4–3–1	19–15–6
Detroit	2–1–5	4–4	—	4–2–2	2–4–2	6–2	18–13–9
Montreal	3–2–3	4–4	2–4–2	—	4–3–1	4–1–3	17–14–9
New York	4–4	1–4–3	4–2–2	3–4–1	—	6–2	18–16–6
Toronto	3–4–1	3–4–1	2–6	1–4–3	2–6	—	11–24–5

==== Vs. West Division ====
1969–70 NHL records
Team	LAK	MIN	OAK	PHI	PIT	STL	Total
Boston	5–0–1	4–1–1	5–0–1	4–0–2	5–0–1	3–1–2	26–2–8
Chicago	5–1	3–2–1	3–3	4–0–2	6–0	4–2	25–8–3
Detroit	6–0	1–1–4	4–2	3–1–2	4–2	4–2	22–8–6
Montreal	6–0	2–2–2	3–2–1	4–0–2	4–2	2–2–2	21–8–7
New York	4–1–1	3–1–2	5–1	0–0–6	4–1–1	4–2	20–6–10
Toronto	3–1–2	2–2–2	4–1–1	3–2–1	2–2–2	4–2	18–10–8

== Schedule and results ==
1969–70 regular season
October

Game	Result	Date	Score	Opponent	Record
1	W	October 11, 1969	5–1	Los Angeles Kings (1969–70)	1–0–0
2	T	October 15, 1969	2–2	@ Toronto Maple Leafs (1969–70)	1–0–1
3	W	October 18, 1969	7–3	New York Rangers (1969–70)	2–0–1
4	T	October 19, 1969	1–1	@ Philadelphia Flyers (1969–70)	2–0–2
5	T	October 22, 1969	3–3	St. Louis Blues (1969–70)	2–0–3
6	L	October 25, 1969	0–5	Chicago Black Hawks (1969–70)	2–1–3
7	W	October 26, 1969	8–3	@ New York Rangers (1969–70)	3–1–3
8	L	October 29, 1969	1–4	@ Minnesota North Stars (1969–70)	3–2–3
9	T	October 30, 1969	2–2	@ St. Louis Blues (1969–70)	3–2–4

November

Game	Result	Date	Score	Opponent	Record
10	W	November 1, 1969	9–2	Boston Bruins (1969–70)	4–2–4
11	T	November 5, 1969	2–2	Minnesota North Stars (1969–70)	4–2–5
12	W	November 6, 1969	4–1	@ Philadelphia Flyers (1969–70)	5–2–5
13	W	November 8, 1969	6–3	Toronto Maple Leafs (1969–70)	6–2–5
14	W	November 10, 1969	6–3	@ Los Angeles Kings (1969–70)	7–2–5
15	W	November 12, 1969	5–0	@ Oakland Seals (1969–70)	8–2–5
16	W	November 15, 1969	3–2	@ St. Louis Blues (1969–70)	9–2–5
17	L	November 16, 1969	0–1	@ Chicago Black Hawks (1969–70)	9–3–5
18	T	November 19, 1969	5–5	Detroit Red Wings (1969–70)	9–3–6
19	W	November 22, 1969	4–2	Oakland Seals (1969–70)	10–3–6
20	T	November 23, 1969	2–2	@ Boston Bruins (1969–70)	10–3–7
21	W	November 26, 1969	3–1	@ Toronto Maple Leafs (1969–70)	11–3–7
22	T	November 29, 1969	2–2	Boston Bruins (1969–70)	11–3–8

December

Game	Result	Date	Score	Opponent	Record
23	W	December 4, 1969	1–0	@ Chicago Black Hawks (1969–70)	12–3–8
24	L	December 6, 1969	3–4	Minnesota North Stars (1969–70)	12–4–8
25	L	December 7, 1969	3–6	@ New York Rangers (1969–70)	12–5–8
26	W	December 10, 1969	6–3	Toronto Maple Leafs (1969–70)	13–5–8
27	W	December 13, 1969	4–1	Chicago Black Hawks (1969–70)	14–5–8
28	L	December 14, 1969	2–5	@ Detroit Red Wings (1969–70)	14–6–8
29	W	December 17, 1969	5–2	@ Pittsburgh Penguins (1969–70)	15–6–8
30	L	December 20, 1969	2–3	Detroit Red Wings (1969–70)	15–7–8
31	W	December 21, 1969	5–2	@ Boston Bruins (1969–70)	16–7–8
32	T	December 26, 1969	3–3	@ Detroit Red Wings (1969–70)	16–7–9
33	T	December 27, 1969	2–2	Philadelphia Flyers (1969–70)	16–7–10
34	L	December 30, 1969	0–5	St. Louis Blues (1969–70)	16–8–10
35	L	December 31, 1969	2–4	@ Pittsburgh Penguins (1969–70)	16–9–10

January

Game	Result	Date	Score	Opponent	Record
36	W	January 3, 1970	5–1	Oakland Seals (1969–70)	17–9–10
37	W	January 6, 1970	4–3	Los Angeles Kings (1969–70)	18–9–10
38	W	January 8, 1970	3–1	Pittsburgh Penguins (1969–70)	19–9–10
39	W	January 11, 1970	4–1	New York Rangers (1969–70)	20–9–10
40	W	January 14, 1970	4–2	Los Angeles Kings (1969–70)	21–9–10
41	L	January 17, 1970	0–3	Oakland Seals (1969–70)	21–10–10
42	L	January 18, 1970	3–6	@ Boston Bruins (1969–70)	21–11–10
43	W	January 22, 1970	4–2	@ Minnesota North Stars (1969–70)	22–11–10
44	W	January 24, 1970	4–1	Chicago Black Hawks (1969–70)	23–11–10
45	W	January 25, 1970	4–1	@ Detroit Red Wings (1969–70)	24–11–10
46	W	January 28, 1970	5–4	Minnesota North Stars (1969–70)	25–11–10
47	T	January 31, 1970	3–3	Boston Bruins (1969–70)	25–11–11

February

Game	Result	Date	Score	Opponent	Record
48	W	February 1, 1970	5–2	@ Philadelphia Flyers (1969–70)	26–11–11
49	L	February 4, 1970	2–5	@ Oakland Seals (1969–70)	26–12–11
50	W	February 5, 1970	5–3	@ Los Angeles Kings (1969–70)	27–12–11
51	T	February 7, 1970	1–1	@ Minnesota North Stars (1969–70)	27–12–12
52	W	February 8, 1970	3–2	@ Chicago Black Hawks (1969–70)	28–12–12
53	T	February 11, 1970	3–3	Toronto Maple Leafs (1969–70)	28–12–13
54	L	February 14, 1970	2–5	Detroit Red Wings (1969–70)	28–13–13
55	L	February 15, 1970	0–2	@ New York Rangers (1969–70)	28–14–13
56	L	February 18, 1970	3–5	@ Toronto Maple Leafs (1969–70)	28–15–13
57	W	February 21, 1970	5–3	Philadelphia Flyers (1969–70)	29–15–13
58	W	February 22, 1970	1–0	@ Detroit Red Wings (1969–70)	30–15–13
59	W	February 25, 1970	3–2	Pittsburgh Penguins (1969–70)	31–15–13
60	L	February 28, 1970	2–3	St. Louis Blues (1969–70)	31–16–13

March

Game	Result	Date	Score	Opponent	Record
61	L	March 4, 1970	1–2	@ Pittsburgh Penguins (1969–70)	31–17–13
62	L	March 7, 1970	2–4	Detroit Red Wings (1969–70)	31–18–13
63	L	March 8, 1970	0–2	@ Boston Bruins (1969–70)	31–19–13
64	W	March 11, 1970	5–3	New York Rangers (1969–70)	32–19–13
65	W	March 14, 1970	6–2	@ St. Louis Blues (1969–70)	33–19–13
66	T	March 15, 1970	3–3	@ Toronto Maple Leafs (1969–70)	33–19–14
67	T	March 18, 1970	2–2	@ Oakland Seals (1969–70)	33–19–15
68	W	March 19, 1970	6–1	@ Los Angeles Kings (1969–70)	34–19–15
69	W	March 21, 1970	2–0	Philadelphia Flyers (1969–70)	35–19–15
70	W	March 22, 1970	5–4	Pittsburgh Penguins (1969–70)	36–19–15
71	W	March 25, 1970	5–2	Toronto Maple Leafs (1969–70)	37–19–15
72	T	March 28, 1970	1–1	New York Rangers (1969–70)	37–19–16
73	L	March 29, 1970	1–4	@ New York Rangers (1969–70)	37–20–16

April

Game	Result	Date	Score	Opponent	Record
74	W	April 1, 1970	6–3	Boston Bruins (1969–70)	38–20–16
75	L	April 4, 1970	1–4	Chicago Black Hawks (1969–70)	38–21–16
76	L	April 5, 1970	2–10	@ Chicago Black Hawks (1969–70)	38–22–16

Legend: Win (2 points) Loss (0 points) Tie (1 point)

== Player statistics ==
=== Regular season ===
==== Scoring ====
Player	Pos	GP	G	A	Pts	PIM	PPG	SHG	GWG
Yvan Cournoyer	RW	72	27	36	63	23	10	0	4
Jacques Lemaire	C	69	32	28	60	16	13	0	5
Bobby Rousseau	RW	72	24	34	58	30	5	2	4
Mickey Redmond	RW	75	27	27	54	61	3	0	2
Henri Richard	C	62	16	36	52	61	2	0	4
Jean Beliveau	C	63	19	30	49	10	3	0	1
Ralph Backstrom	C	72	19	24	43	20	1	0	2
Jacques Laperriere	D	73	6	31	37	98	2	1	1
John Ferguson	LW	48	19	13	32	139	6	0	7
Serge Savard	D	64	12	19	31	38	5	3	2
Terry Harper	D	75	4	18	22	109	0	0	0
Claude Provost	RW	65	10	11	21	22	0	0	1
J.C. Tremblay	D	58	2	19	21	7	1	0	0
Ted Harris	D	74	3	17	20	116	0	0	0
Pete Mahovlich	C	36	9	8	17	51	0	0	2
Christian Bordeleau	C	48	2	13	15	18	0	0	0
Larry Mickey	RW	21	4	4	8	4	3	0	2
Marc Tardif	LW	18	3	2	5	27	1	0	0
Lucien Grenier	RW	23	2	3	5	2	0	0	1
Bobby Sheehan	C	16	2	1	3	2	0	0	0
Dick Duff	LW	17	1	1	2	4	0	0	0
Larry Pleau	C	20	1	0	1	0	0	1	0
Jean Gauthier	D	4	0	1	1	0	0	0	0
Rejean Houle	W	9	0	1	1	0	0	0	0
Phil Roberto	RW	8	0	1	1	8	0	0	0
Guy Charron	C	5	0	0	0	0	0	0	0
Paul Curtis	D	1	0	0	0	0	0	0	0
Jude Drouin	C	3	0	0	0	2	0	0	0
Fran Huck	C	2	0	0	0	0	0	0	0
Guy Lapointe	D	5	0	0	0	4	0	0	0
Phil Myre	G	10	0	0	0	2	0	0	0
Rogie Vachon	G	64	0	0	0	0	0	0	0
Gump Worsley	G	6	0	0	0	0	0	0	0

==== Goaltending ====
Player	MIN	GP	W	L	T	GA	GAA	SO
Rogie Vachon	3697	64	31	18	12	162	2.63	4
Phil Myre	503	10	4	3	2	19	2.27	0
Gump Worsley	360	6	3	1	2	14	2.33	0
Team:	4560	76	38	22	16	195	2.57	4

Note:

Pos = Position;GP = Games played; G = Goals; A = Assists; Pts = Points; PIM = Penalty minutes; +/- = Plus/minus; PPG = Power-play goals; SHG = Short-handed goals; GWG = Game-winning goals
Pos = Position;GP = Games played; Min, TOI = Minutes played; W = Wins; L = Losses; T,T/OT = Ties; OTL = Overtime losses; GA = Goals-against; GAA = Goals-against average; SO = Shutouts; SA = Shots against; SV = Shots saved;SV% = Save percentage;

== Awards and records ==
- Jacques Laperriere, Defence, NHL Second Team All-Star

== Draft picks ==
Round	#	Player	Nationality	College/Junior/Club team (League)
1	1	Réjean Houle	Canada	Montreal Junior Canadiens (OHA)
1	2	Marc Tardif	Canada	Montreal Junior Canadiens (OHA)
3	32	Bobby Sheehan	United States	St. Catharines Black Hawks (OHA)
4	44	Murray Anderson	Canada	Flin Flon Bombers (WCHL)
5	56	Gary Doyle	Canada	Ottawa 67's (OHA)
6	63	Guy Delparte	Canada	London Knights (OHA)
6	68	Lynn Powis	Canada	Denver Pioneers (NCAA)
7	74	Ian Wilkie	Canada	Edmonton Oil Kings (WCHL)
7	75	Dale Power	Canada	Peterborough Petes (OHA)
8	79	Frank Hamill	Canada	Toronto Marlboros (OHA)
9	83	Gilles Drolet	Canada	Quebec Remparts (QMJHL)
10	84	Darrel Knibbs	Canada	Lethbridge Sugar Kings (AJHL)

== See also ==
- 1969–70 NHL season
