= Ray Fortin =

Canadian ice hockey player (1941–2023)

- Born: March 11, 1941 Drummondville, Quebec, Canada
- Died: May 7, 2023 (aged 82) Drummondville, Quebec, Canada
- Height: 5 ft 8 in (173 cm)
- Weight: 180 lb (82 kg; 12 st 12 lb)
- Position: Defence
- Shot: Left
- Played for: St. Louis Blues
- Playing career: 1967–1974

Raymond Henri Fortin (March 11, 1941 – May 7, 2023) was a Canadian professional ice hockey player. The diminutive 5-foot-8 defenseman took part in 92 regular season and six postseason games in the National Hockey League for the St. Louis Blues over three seasons (1967-70). He was a member of the Blues expansion club that advanced to the 1968 Stanley Cup Final in their first season.

The Blues traded Fortin to the Los Angeles Kings for defenseman Bob Wall after the 1969-70 campaign. He reported to their American Hockey League affiliate but was traded in January, 1971 to the Montreal Canadiens, where he was buried in a deep farm system. He was named to the AHL All-Star team that season but not promoted to the NHL club.

Fortin died on May 7, 2023 at 82 years of age.

== Career statistics ==
=== Regular season and playoffs ===
			Regular season					Playoffs
Season	Team	League	GP	G	A	Pts	PIM	GP	G	A	Pts	PIM
1961–62	Drummondville Rockets	ETSHL	—	—	—	—	—	10	1	1	2	4
1962–63	Drummondville Rockets	ETSHL	—	—	—	—	—	—	—	—	—	—
1963–64	Drummondville Rockets	ETSHL	—	—	—	—	—	—	—	—	—	—
1965–66	Drummondville Eagles	QHL	42	5	12	17	54	5	0	0	0	13
1965–66	Sherbrooke Castors	Al-Cup	—	—	—	—	—	19	0	4	4	16
1966–67	Drummondville Eagles	QHL	42	9	17	26	54	9	1	4	5	6
1966–67	Drummondville Eagles	Al-Cup	—	—	—	—	—	9	1	1	2	14
1967–68	St. Louis Blues	NHL	24	0	2	2	8	3	0	0	0	2
1967–68	Kansas City Blues	CHL	22	1	2	3	22	—	—	—	—	—
1968–69	St. Louis Blues	NHL	11	1	0	1	6	—	—	—	—	—
1968–69	Kansas City Blues	CHL	50	6	18	24	59	—	—	—	—	—
1969–70	St. Louis Blues	NHL	57	1	4	5	19	3	0	0	0	6
1970–71	Springfield Kings	AHL	25	2	14	16	18	—	—	—	—	—
1970–71	Montreal Voyageurs	AHL	29	4	11	15	20	3	0	2	2	4
1971–72	Boston Braves	AHL	76	3	24	27	64	8	0	0	0	6
1972–73	Boston Braves	AHL	74	1	20	21	28	1	0	0	0	0
1973–74	San Diego Gulls	WHL	69	1	15	16	36	4	0	1	1	4
AHL totals			204	10	69	79	130	12	0	2	2	10
NHL totals			92	2	6	8	33	6	0	0	0	8
