= Hank Monteith =

Canadian ice hockey player

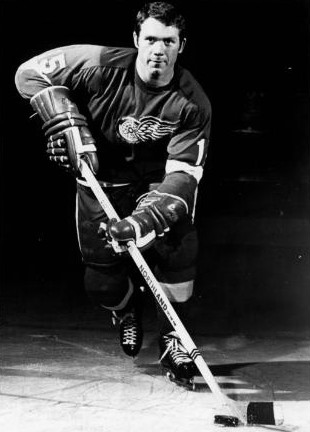
- Monteith in 1969
- Born: October 2, 1945 (age 79); Stratford, Ontario, Canada
- Height: 5 ft 10 in (178 cm)
- Weight: 170 lb (77 kg; 12 st 2 lb)
- Position: Left wing
- Shot: Left
- Played for: Detroit Red Wings
- Playing career: 1967–1975

Henry George "Hank" Monteith (born October 2, 1945) is a Canadian retired professional ice hockey player who played 77 games in the National Hockey League with the Detroit Red Wings between 1968 and 1971.

== Career statistics ==
=== Regular season and playoffs ===
			Regular season					Playoffs
Season	Team	League	GP	G	A	Pts	PIM	GP	G	A	Pts	PIM
1961–62	Stratford Cullitons	OHA-B	—	—	—	—	—	—	—	—	—	—
1962–63	University of Toronto	CIAU	16	10	30	40	—	—	—	—	—	—
1963–64	University of Toronto	CIAU	20	25	39	64	—	—	—	—	—	—
1964–65	University of Toronto	CIAU	13	23	34	57	31	—	—	—	—	—
1965–66	University of Toronto	CIAU	16	23	20	43	30	—	—	—	—	—
1966–67	University of Toronto	CIAU	16	21	24	45	14	—	—	—	—	—
1967–68	Fort Worth Wings	CHL	66	19	31	50	36	11	1	3	4	0
1968–69	Detroit Red Wings	NHL	34	1	9	10	6	—	—	—	—	—
1968–69	Fort Worth Wings	CHL	33	17	13	30	14	—	—	—	—	—
1969–70	Detroit Red Wings	NHL	9	0	0	0	0	4	0	0	0	0
1969–70	Fort Worth Wings	CHL	52	20	28	48	38	—	—	—	—	—
1970–71	Detroit Red Wings	NHL	34	4	3	7	0	—	—	—	—	—
1970–71	Fort Worth Wings	CHL	21	11	15	26	4	4	1	2	3	4
1971–72	Oakville Oaks	OHA Sr	27	16	24	40	14	—	—	—	—	—
1972–73	Oakville Oaks	OHA Sr	20	17	26	43	10	—	—	—	—	—
1972–73	Orillia Terriers	OHA Sr	16	4	15	19	4	—	—	—	—	—
1973–74	Orillia Terriers	OHA Sr	31	15	34	49	19	—	—	—	—	—
1974–75	Orillia Terriers	OHA Sr	29	20	14	34	6	—	—	—	—	—
OHA Sr totals			123	72	113	185	53	—	—	—	—	—
NHL totals			77	5	12	17	6	4	0	0	0	0
