= 1969–70 Chicago Black Hawks season =

National Hockey League team season

1969–70 Chicago Black Hawks
- East Division champions
- Division: 1st East
- 1969–70 record: 45–22–9
- Home record: 26–7–5
- Road record: 19–15–4
- Goals for: 250
- Goals against: 170

Team information
- General manager: Tommy Ivan
- Coach: Billy Reay
- Captain: Pat Stapleton
- Alternate captains: Stan Mikita; Eric Nesterenko; Doug Jarrett
- Arena: Chicago Stadium

Team leaders
- Goals: Stan Mikita (39)
- Assists: Stan Mikita (47)
- Points: Stan Mikita (86)
- Penalty minutes: Keith Magnuson (213)
- Plus/minus: Keith Magnuson (+38)
- Wins: Tony Esposito (38)
- Goals against average: Tony Esposito (2.17)

The 1969–70 Chicago Black Hawks season was the Hawks' 44th season in the NHL, and the club was coming off a sixth-place finish in the East Division in 1968–69, failing to qualify for the playoffs for the first time since the 1957–58 season. Despite missing the playoffs, the Black Hawks had a record of 34–33–9, earning 77 points, as they had their ninth consecutive season of playing over .500 hockey.

During the off-season, Chicago claimed goaltender Tony Esposito from the Montreal Canadiens in the intra-league draft on June 11, 1969. The Hawks also named Pat Stapleton as their new team captain. The Black Hawks did not have a captain for the 1968–69 season, as the spot was not filled after former captain Pierre Pilote was traded during the 1968 off-season.

The Black Hawks began the season very slowly, as they lost their opening five games to quickly fall into the East Division cellar. Chicago then rebounded, and after 35 games, the Hawks had a 15–15–5 record. The Black Hawks then got hot, as they went on a seven-game winning streak, and continued to play great hockey for the rest of the season, as Chicago won a franchise record 45 games, earning a club record 99 points tied with Boston Bruins for first overall. However, since Chicago won five more games, they finished in first place for the second time in franchise history and were awarded the Prince of Wales Trophy.

Offensively, the Hawks were led by Stan Mikita, who scored a team high 39 goals, 47 assists and 86 points, as he finished third in the NHL scoring race. Bobby Hull had another solid season, scoring 38 goals and 67 points, while Pit Martin had 30 goals and 63 points. Team captain Pat Stapleton led the defense with 42 points, while Keith Magnuson had a club record 213 penalty minutes, along with a club high +38 rating.

In goal, Tony Esposito emerged as one of the top goaltenders in the league, as he won a club record 38 games, while posting a 2.17 GAA and a team record 15 shutouts. Esposito was awarded the Calder Memorial Trophy and the Vezina Trophy for his efforts.

The Hawks opened the playoffs against the Detroit Red Wings in the East Division semi-finals. The Red Wings finished the season with a 40–21–15 record, earning 95 points, which was good for third in the East Division. The series opened with two games at Chicago Stadium, and the Black Hawks used home ice to their advantage, as they defeated Detroit by scores of 4–2 in both games to take the early series lead. The series shifted to the Detroit Olympia for the next two games, however, Chicago stayed hot, as they once again won both games by scores of 4–2 to sweep the series and advance to the next playoff round.

Chicago faced the Boston Bruins in the East Division finals. Both teams finished the season with 99 points, however, since Boston had a record of 40–17–19, which was five wins less than Chicago, the Black Hawks were awarded home ice advantage. The Bruins had defeated the New York Rangers in their opening round. The series opened in Chicago, however, it was the Bruins who took control of the series, winning both games at Chicago Stadium by scores of 6–3 and 4–1 to take the series lead. The series moved to the Boston Garden for the next two games, and the Bruins easily knocked off the Black Hawks, winning the third game by a 5–2 score, then clinching the series with a 5–4 victory in the fourth game, sweeping the Black Hawks.

== Season standings ==
East Division
		GP	W	L	T	GF	GA	DIFF	Pts
1	Chicago Black Hawks	76	45	22	9	250	170	+80	99
2	Boston Bruins	76	40	17	19	277	216	+61	99
3	Detroit Red Wings	76	40	21	15	246	199	+47	95
4	New York Rangers	76	38	22	16	246	189	+57	92
5	Montreal Canadiens	76	38	22	16	244	201	+43	92
6	Toronto Maple Leafs	76	29	34	13	222	242	−20	71

=== Record vs. opponents ===
==== Vs. East Division ====
1969–70 NHL records
Team	BOS	CHI	DET	MTL	NYR	TOR	Total
Boston	—	3–3–2	1–2–5	2–3–3	4–4	4–3–1	14–15–11
Chicago	3–3–2	—	4–4	4–4	4–1–3	4–3–1	19–15–6
Detroit	2–1–5	4–4	—	4–2–2	2–4–2	6–2	18–13–9
Montreal	3–2–3	4–4	2–4–2	—	4–3–1	4–1–3	17–14–9
New York	4–4	1–4–3	4–2–2	3–4–1	—	6–2	18–16–6
Toronto	3–4–1	3–4–1	2–6	1–4–3	2–6	—	11–24–5

==== Vs. West Division ====
1969–70 NHL records
Team	LAK	MIN	OAK	PHI	PIT	STL	Total
Boston	5–0–1	4–1–1	5–0–1	4–0–2	5–0–1	3–1–2	26–2–8
Chicago	5–1	3–2–1	3–3	4–0–2	6–0	4–2	25–8–3
Detroit	6–0	1–1–4	4–2	3–1–2	4–2	4–2	22–8–6
Montreal	6–0	2–2–2	3–2–1	4–0–2	4–2	2–2–2	21–8–7
New York	4–1–1	3–1–2	5–1	0–0–6	4–1–1	4–2	20–6–10
Toronto	3–1–2	2–2–2	4–1–1	3–2–1	2–2–2	4–2	18–10–8

== Schedule and results ==
=== Regular season ===
1969–70 regular season
October

Game	Date	Visitor	Score	Home	Record	Points
1	October 11	Chicago Black Hawks	2–7	St. Louis Blues	0–1–0	0
2	October 12	Oakland Seals	2–1	Chicago Black Hawks	0–2–0	0
3	October 15	Detroit Red Wings	4–1	Chicago Black Hawks	0–3–0	0
4	October 18	Chicago Black Hawks	1–4	Toronto Maple Leafs	0–4–0	0
5	October 19	Minnesota North Stars	4–1	Chicago Black Hawks	0–5–0	0
6	October 22	Chicago Black Hawks	1–1	New York Rangers	0–5–1	1
7	October 25	Chicago Black Hawks	5–0	Montreal Canadiens	1–5–1	3
8	October 29	Chicago Black Hawks	1–3	Oakland Seals	1–6–1	3

November

Game	Date	Visitor	Score	Home	Record	Points
9	November 1	Chicago Black Hawks	4–1	Los Angeles Kings	2–6–1	5
10	November 5	New York Rangers	1–3	Chicago Black Hawks	3–6–1	7
11	November 8	Chicago Black Hawks	4–1	Pittsburgh Penguins	4–6–1	9
12	November 9	Toronto Maple Leafs	0–9	Chicago Black Hawks	5–6–1	11
13	November 15	Oakland Seals	2–3	Chicago Black Hawks	6–6–1	13
14	November 16	Montreal Canadiens	0–1	Chicago Black Hawks	7–6–1	15
15	November 19	New York Rangers	1–1	Chicago Black Hawks	7–6–2	16
16	November 21	Boston Bruins	2–2	Chicago Black Hawks	7–6–3	17
17	November 23	Pittsburgh Penguins	2–3	Chicago Black Hawks	8–6–3	19
18	November 26	Los Angeles Kings	0–6	Chicago Black Hawks	9–6–3	21
19	November 29	Chicago Black Hawks	4–5	Detroit Red Wings	9–7–3	21
20	November 30	St. Louis Blues	1–3	Chicago Black Hawks	10–7–3	23

December

Game	Date	Visitor	Score	Home	Record	Points
21	December 3	Chicago Black Hawks	3–3	New York Rangers	10–7–4	24
22	December 4	Montreal Canadiens	1–0	Chicago Black Hawks	10–8–4	24
23	December 6	Chicago Black Hawks	1–6	Boston Bruins	10–9–4	24
24	December 7	Detroit Red Wings	1–5	Chicago Black Hawks	11–9–4	26
25	December 10	Chicago Black Hawks	5–8	Minnesota North Stars	11–10–4	26
26	December 13	Chicago Black Hawks	1–4	Montreal Canadiens	11–11–4	26
27	December 14	Philadelphia Flyers	1–4	Chicago Black Hawks	12–11–4	28
28	December 17	Chicago Black Hawks	1–3	Los Angeles Kings	12–12–4	28
29	December 19	Chicago Black Hawks	4–0	Oakland Seals	13–12–4	30
30	December 21	St. Louis Blues	0–4	Chicago Black	14–12–4	32
31	December 25	Chicago Black Hawks	4–4	Minnesota North Stars	14–12–5	33
32	December 27	Chicago Black Hawks	3–0	Pittsburgh Penguins	15–12–5	35
33	December 31	Chicago Black Hawks	1–2	New York Rangers	15–13–5	35

January

Game	Date	Visitor	Score	Home	Record	Points
34	January 3	Chicago Black Hawks	2–6	Toronto Maple Leafs	15–14–5	35
35	January 4	Chicago Black Hawks	0–4	Detroit Red Wings	15–15–5	35
36	January 7	Detroit Red Wings	0–7	Chicago Black Hawks	16–15–5	37
37	January 10	Chicago Black Hawks	6–2	St. Louis Blues	17–15–5	39
38	January 11	Los Angeles Kings	1–3	Chicago Black Hawks	18–15–5	41
39	January 14	Pittsburgh Penguins	0–5	Chicago Black Hawks	19–15–5	43
40	January 17	Chicago Black Hawks	1–0	Boston Bruins	20–15–5	45
41	January 18	Oakland Seals	1–3	Chicago Black Hawks	21–15–5	47
42	January 22	Chicago Black Hawks	4–3	Detroit Red Wings	22–15–5	49
43	January 24	Chicago Black Hawks	1–4	Montreal Canadiens	22–16–5	49
44	January 25	Toronto Maple Leafs	3–2	Chicago Black Hawks	22–17–5	49
45	January 28	Philadelphia Flyers	2–2	Chicago Black Hawks	22–17–6	50
46	January 31	Chicago Black Hawks	5–0	Philadelphia Flyers	23–17–6	52

February

Game	Date	Visitor	Score	Home	Record	Points
47	February 1	Minnesota North Stars	4–7	Chicago Black Hawks	24–17–6	54
48	February 4	Boston Bruins	4–8	Chicago Black Hawks	25–17–6	56
49	February 7	Philadelphia Flyers	4–4	Chicago Black Hawks	25–17–7	57
50	February 8	Montreal Canadiens	3–2	Chicago Black Hawks	25–18–7	57
51	February 11	Pittsburgh Penguins	1–7	Chicago Black Hawks	26–18–7	59
52	February 14	Chicago Black Hawks	5–2	Minnesota North Stars	27–18–7	61
53	February 15	Toronto Maple Leafs	4–6	Chicago Black Hawks	28–18–7	63
54	February 18	Chicago Black Hawks	2–5	St. Louis Blues	28–19–7	63
55	February 19	Minnesota North Stars	2–3	Chicago Black Hawks	29–19–7	65
56	February 21	New York Rangers	2–4	Chicago Black Hawks	30–19–7	67
57	February 22	Boston Bruins	3–6	Chicago Black Hawks	31–19–7	69
58	February 26	Chicago Black Hawks	3–2	Philadelphia Flyers	32–19–7	71
59	February 28	Chicago Black Hawks	0–3	Boston Bruins	32–20–7	71

March

Game	Date	Visitor	Score	Home	Record	Points
60	March 1	Chicago Black Hawks	3–1	New York Rangers	33–20–7	73
61	March 3	Chicago Black Hawks	3–1	Los Angeles Kings	34–20–7	75
62	March 6	Chicago Black Hawks	3–2	Oakland Seals	35–20–7	77
63	March 8	Chicago Black Hawks	3–2	Philadelphia Flyers	36–20–7	79
64	March 10	Boston Bruins	0–0	Chicago Black Hawks	36–20–8	80
65	March 14	New York Rangers	4–7	Chicago Black Hawks	37–20–8	82
66	March 15	Los Angeles Kings	2–5	Chicago Black Hawks	38–20–8	84
67	March 18	Chicago Black Hawks	7–4	Toronto Maple Leafs	39–20–8	86
68	March 19	Chicago Black Hawks	1–3	Boston Bruins	39–21–8	86
69	March 21	Chicago Black Hawks	5–3	Pittsburgh Penguins	40–21–8	88
70	March 22	St. Louis Blues	0–1	Chicago Black Hawks	41–21–8	90
71	March 26	Chicago Black Hawks	1–0	Detroit Red Wings	42–21–8	92
72	March 28	Chicago Black Hawks	1–1	Toronto Maple Leafs	42–21–9	93
73	March 29	Toronto Maple Leafs	0–4	Chicago Black Hawks	43–21–9	95

April

Game	Date	Visitor	Score	Home	Record	Points
74	April 1	Detroit Red Wings	5–2	Chicago Black Hawks	43–22–9	95
75	April 4	Chicago Black Hawks	4–1	Montreal Canadiens	44–22–9	97
76	April 5	Montreal Canadiens	2–10	Chicago Black Hawks	45–22–9	99

Legend: Win (2 points) Loss (0 points) Tie (1 point)

=== Playoffs ===
1970 Stanley Cup playoffs
Quarterfinals vs. (3) Detroit Red Wings – Black Hawks win 4–0

Game	Date	Visitor	Score	Home	Series
1	April 8	Detroit Red Wings	2–4	Chicago Black Hawks	1–0
2	April 9	Detroit Red Wings	2–4	Chicago Black Hawks	2–0
3	April 11	Chicago Black Hawks	4–2	Detroit Red Wings	3–0
4	April 12	Chicago Black Hawks	4–2	Detroit Red Wings	4–0

Semifinals vs. (2) Boston Bruins – Bruins win 4–0

Game	Date	Visitor	Score	Home	Series
1	April 19	Boston Bruins	6–3	Chicago Black Hawks	0–1
2	April 21	Boston Bruins	4–1	Chicago Black Hawks	0–2
3	April 23	Chicago Black Hawks	2–5	Boston Bruins	0–3
4	April 26	Chicago Black Hawks	4–5	Boston Bruins	0–4

Legend: Win Loss

== Season stats ==
=== Scoring leaders ===
Player	GP	G	A	Pts	PIM
Stan Mikita	76	39	47	86	50
Bobby Hull	61	38	29	67	8
Pit Martin	73	30	33	63	61
Jim Pappin	66	28	25	53	68
Dennis Hull	76	17	35	52	31

=== Goaltending ===
= Indicates league leader

Player	GP	TOI	W	L	T	GA	SO	GAA
Gerry Desjardins	4	240	4	0	0	8	0	2.00
Tony Esposito	63	3763	38	17	8	136	15	2.17
Denis DeJordy	10	557	3	5	1	25	0	2.69

== Playoff stats ==
=== Scoring leaders ===
Player	GP	G	A	Pts	PIM
Bobby Hull	8	3	8	11	2
Stan Mikita	8	4	6	10	2
Dennis Hull	8	5	2	7	0
Pit Martin	8	3	3	6	4
Jim Pappin	8	3	2	5	6

=== Goaltending ===
Player	GP	TOI	W	L	GA	SO	GAA
Tony Esposito	8	480	4	4	27	0	3.38

== Draft picks ==
Chicago's draft picks at the 1969 NHL amateur draft held at the Queen Elizabeth Hotel in Montreal.

Round	#	Player	Nationality	College/Junior/Club team (League)
1	13	J. P. Bordeleau	Canada	Montreal Jr. Canadiens (OHA)
2	24	Larry Romanchych	Canada	Flin Flon Bombers (WCHL)
3	36	Milt Black	Canada	Winnipeg Jets (WCHL)
4	48	Darryl Maggs	Canada	Calgary Centennials (WCHL)
5	60	Mike Baumgartner	United States	University of North Dakota (NCAA)
6	71	Dave Hudson	Canada	University of North Dakota (OHA)

== Sources ==
- Hockey-Reference
- Rauzulu's Street
- Goalies Archive
- HockeyDB
- National Hockey League Guide & Record Book 2007
