= 1969–70 New York Rangers season =

NHL hockey team season

1969–70 New York Rangers
- Division: 4th East
- 1969–70 record: 38–22–16
- Home record: 22–8–8
- Road record: 16–14–8
- Goals for: 246
- Goals against: 189

Team information
- General manager: Emile Francis
- Coach: Emile Francis
- Captain: Bob Nevin
- Alternate captains: Rod Gilbert; Jim Neilson; Don Marshall
- Arena: Madison Square Garden

Team leaders
- Goals: Dave Balon (33)
- Assists: Walt Tkaczuk (50)
- Points: Walt Tkaczuk (77)
- Penalty minutes: Dave Balon (100)
- Wins: Ed Giacomin (35)
- Goals against average: Ed Giacomin (2.36)

The 1969–70 New York Rangers season was the franchise's 44th season. The Rangers compiled 92 points during the regular season and advanced to the playoffs, where they lost in the quarter-finals to the Boston Bruins.

== Regular season ==
=== Final standings ===
East Division
		GP	W	L	T	GF	GA	DIFF	Pts
1	Chicago Black Hawks	76	45	22	9	250	170	+80	99
2	Boston Bruins	76	40	17	19	277	216	+61	99
3	Detroit Red Wings	76	40	21	15	246	199	+47	95
4	New York Rangers	76	38	22	16	246	189	+57	92
5	Montreal Canadiens	76	38	22	16	244	201	+43	92
6	Toronto Maple Leafs	76	29	34	13	222	242	−20	71

=== Record vs. opponents ===
==== Vs. East Division ====
1969–70 NHL records
Team	BOS	CHI	DET	MTL	NYR	TOR	Total
Boston	—	3–3–2	1–2–5	2–3–3	4–4	4–3–1	14–15–11
Chicago	3–3–2	—	4–4	4–4	4–1–3	4–3–1	19–15–6
Detroit	2–1–5	4–4	—	4–2–2	2–4–2	6–2	18–13–9
Montreal	3–2–3	4–4	2–4–2	—	4–3–1	4–1–3	17–14–9
New York	4–4	1–4–3	4–2–2	3–4–1	—	6–2	18–16–6
Toronto	3–4–1	3–4–1	2–6	1–4–3	2–6	—	11–24–5

==== Vs. West Division ====
1969–70 NHL records
Team	LAK	MIN	OAK	PHI	PIT	STL	Total
Boston	5–0–1	4–1–1	5–0–1	4–0–2	5–0–1	3–1–2	26–2–8
Chicago	5–1	3–2–1	3–3	4–0–2	6–0	4–2	25–8–3
Detroit	6–0	1–1–4	4–2	3–1–2	4–2	4–2	22–8–6
Montreal	6–0	2–2–2	3–2–1	4–0–2	4–2	2–2–2	21–8–7
New York	4–1–1	3–1–2	5–1	0–0–6	4–1–1	4–2	20–6–10
Toronto	3–1–2	2–2–2	4–1–1	3–2–1	2–2–2	4–2	18–10–8

== Schedule and results ==
1969–70 regular season
October: 4–3–2 (home: 2–1–1; road: 2–2–1)

Game	October	Opponent	Score	Record
1	12	@ Boston Bruins	2–1	0–1–0
2	15	Minnesota North Stars	4–3	1–1–0
3	18	@ Montreal Canadiens	7–3	1–2–0
4	19	Toronto Maple Leafs	1–0	2–2–0
5	22	Chicago Black Hawks	1–1	2–2–1
6	25	@ Detroit Red Wings	4–1	3–2–1
7	26	Montreal Canadiens	8–3	3–3–1
8	29	@ Pittsburgh Penguins	3–1	4–3–1
9	30	@ Philadelphia Flyers	3–3	4–3–2

November: 10–1–3 (home: 5–0–2; road: 5–1–1)

Game	November	Opponent	Score	Record
10	1	@ Toronto Maple Leafs	3–2	5–3–2
11	2	St. Louis Blues	6–4	6–3–2
12	5	@ Chicago Black Hawks	3–1	6–4–2
13	7	@ Oakland Seals	8–1	7–4–2
14	8	@ Los Angeles Kings	4–1	8–4–2
15	12	Detroit Red Wings	4–2	9–4–2
16	15	@ Boston Bruins	6–5	10–4–2
17	16	St. Louis Blues	4–2	11–4–2
18	19	@ Chicago Black Hawks	1–1	11–4–3
19	22	@ St. Louis Blues	5–0	12–4–3
20	23	Oakland Seals	5–2	13–4–3
21	26	Boston Bruins	3–0	14–4–3
22	29	Philadelphia Flyers	2–2	14–4–4
23	30	Minnesota North Stars	2–2	14–4–5

December: 6–3–3 (home: 4–2–3; road: 2–1–0)

Game	December	Opponent	Score	Record
24	3	Chicago Black Hawks	3–3	14–4–6
25	7	Montreal Canadiens	6–3	15–4–6
26	10	Boston Bruins	5–2	16–4–6
27	11	@ Boston Bruins	2–1	16–5–6
28	13	@ Minnesota North Stars	5–2	17–5–6
29	14	Toronto Maple Leafs	3–1	17–6–6
30	17	Philadelphia Flyers	2–2	17–6–7
31	20	@ Toronto Maple Leafs	5–2	18–6–7
32	21	Oakland Seals	3–1	19–6–7
33	26	Pittsburgh Penguins	3–2	19–7–7
34	28	Los Angeles Kings	3–3	19–7–8
35	31	Chicago Black Hawks	2–1	20–7–8

January: 7–3–2 (home: 3–0–0; road: 4–3–2)

Game	January	Opponent	Score	Record
36	3	@ Minnesota North Stars	3–3	20–7–9
37	4	Oakland Seals	5–2	21–7–9
38	7	@ Pittsburgh Penguins	5–3	22–7–9
39	11	@ Montreal Canadiens	4–1	22–8–9
40	14	@ Toronto Maple Leafs	7–1	23–8–9
41	15	@ Philadelphia Flyers	4–4	23–8–10
42	17	@ Minnesota North Stars	3–1	24–8–10
43	22	@ St. Louis Blues	4–3	24–9–10
44	24	Boston Bruins	8–1	25–9–10
45	25	Los Angeles Kings	3–2	26–9–10
46	28	@ Los Angeles Kings	5–4	26–10–10
47	30	@ Oakland Seals	2–1	27–10–10

February: 7–3–3 (home: 6–0–1; road: 1–3–2)

Game	February	Opponent	Score	Record
48	1	Pittsburgh Penguins	6–0	28–10–10
49	4	Detroit Red Wings	5–1	29–10–10
50	8	Los Angeles Kings	5–1	30–10–10
51	11	@ Los Angeles Kings	6–2	31–10–10
52	13	@ Oakland Seals	4–2	31–11–10
53	15	Montreal Canadiens	2–0	32–11–10
54	18	Philadelphia Flyers	3–3	32–11–11
55	19	@ Detroit Red Wings	3–3	32–11–12
56	21	@ Chicago Black Hawks	4–2	32–12–12
57	22	Toronto Maple Leafs	5–3	33–12–12
58	25	St. Louis Blues	2–1	34–12–12
59	26	@ Boston Bruins	5–3	34–13–12
60	28	@ Detroit Red Wings	3–3	34–13–13

March: 2–8–3 (home: 1–5–1; road: 1–3–2)

Game	March	Opponent	Score	Record
61	1	Chicago Black Hawks	3–1	34–14–13
62	4	Detroit Red Wings	2–0	34–15–13
63	6	@ St. Louis Blues	3–1	34–16–13
64	8	Pittsburgh Penguins	0–0	34–16–14
65	11	@ Montreal Canadiens	5–3	34–17–14
66	14	@ Chicago Black Hawks	7–4	34–18–14
67	15	Minnesota North Stars	4–2	34–19–14
68	18	@ Pittsburgh Penguins	2–0	35–19–14
69	19	@ Philadelphia Flyers	2–2	35–19–15
70	22	Toronto Maple Leafs	5–2	35–20–15
71	25	Boston Bruins	3–1	35–21–15
72	28	@ Montreal Canadiens	1–1	35–21–16
73	29	Montreal Canadiens	4–1	36–21–16

April: 2–1–0 (home: 1–0–0; road: 1–1–0)

Game	April	Opponent	Score	Record
74	1	@ Toronto Maple Leafs	2–1	37–21–16
75	4	@ Detroit Red Wings	6–2	37–22–16
76	5	Detroit Red Wings	9–5	38–22–16

Legend: Win (2 points) Loss (0 points) Tie (1 point)

== Playoffs ==
1970 Stanley Cup playoffs
Quarterfinals vs. (2) Boston Bruins – Rangers win 4–2

Game	Date	Visitor	Score	Home	OT	Series
1	April 8	New York Rangers	2–8	Boston Bruins		Boston leads series 1–0
2	April 9	New York Rangers	3–5	Boston Bruins		Boston leads series 2–0
3	April 11	Boston Bruins	3–4	New York Rangers		Boston leads series 2–1
4	April 12	Boston Bruins	2–4	New York Rangers		Series tied 2–2
5	April 14	New York Rangers	2–3	Boston Bruins		Boston leads series 3–2
6	April 16	Boston Bruins	4–1	New York Rangers		Boston wins series 4–2

Legend: Win Loss

== Player statistics ==
Skaters

Regular season
Player	GP	G	A	Pts	PIM
Walt Tkaczuk	76	27	50	77	38
Jean Ratelle	75	32	42	74	28
Dave Balon	76	33	37	70	100
Bill Fairbairn	76	23	33	56	23
Vic Hadfield	71	20	34	54	69
Rod Gilbert	72	16	37	53	22
Bob Nevin	68	18	19	37	8
Brad Park	60	11	26	37	98
Arnie Brown	73	15	21	36	78
Rod Seiling	76	5	21	26	68
Ron Stewart	76	14	10	24	14
Donnie Marshall	57	9	15	24	6
Jim Neilson	62	3	20	23	75
Juha Widing^{‡}	44	7	7	14	10
Orland Kurtenbach	53	4	10	14	47
Real Lemieux^{†}	55	4	6	10	51
Tim Horton^{†}	15	1	5	6	16
Al Hamilton	59	0	5	5	54
Jack Egers	6	3	0	3	2
Don Luce	12	1	2	3	8
Larry Brown	15	0	3	3	8
Ted Irvine^{†}	17	0	3	3	10
Don Blackburn	3	0	0	0	0
Ab DeMarco	3	0	0	0	0
Mike Robitaille	4	0	0	0	8

Playoffs
Player	GP	G	A	Pts	PIM
Rod Gilbert	6	4	5	9	0
Jack Egers	5	3	1	4	10
Arnie Brown	4	0	4	4	9
Jean Ratelle	6	1	3	4	0
Ted Irvine	6	1	2	3	8
Orland Kurtenbach	6	1	2	3	24
Brad Park	5	1	2	3	11
Walt Tkaczuk	6	2	1	3	17
Tim Horton	6	1	1	2	28
Bob Nevin	6	1	1	2	2
Dave Balon	6	1	1	2	32
Don Luce	5	0	1	1	4
Jim Neilson	6	0	1	1	8
Bill Fairbairn	6	0	1	1	10
Ab DeMarco	5	0	0	0	2
Don Blackburn	1	0	0	0	0
Al Hamilton	5	0	0	0	2
Donnie Marshall	1	0	0	0	0
Ron Stewart	6	0	0	0	2
Rod Seiling	2	0	0	0	0

Goaltenders

Regular season
Player	GP	TOI	W	L	T	GA	GAA	SO
Ed Giacomin	70	4148	35	21	14	163	2.36	6
Terry Sawchuk	8	412	3	1	2	20	2.91	1

Playoffs
Player	GP	TOI	W	L	GA	GAA	SO
Ed Giacomin	5	280	2	3	19	4.07	0
Terry Sawchuk	3	80	0	1	6	4.50	0

^{†}Denotes player spent time with another team before joining Rangers. Stats reflect time with Rangers only.
^{‡}Traded mid-season. Stats reflect time with Rangers only.

Note:

Pos = Position;GP = Games played; G = Goals; A = Assists; Pts = Points; PIM = Penalty minutes; +/- = Plus/minus; PPG = Power-play goals; SHG = Short-handed goals; GWG = Game-winning goals
Pos = Position;GP = Games played; Min, TOI = Minutes played; W = Wins; L = Losses; T,T/OT = Ties; OTL = Overtime losses; GA = Goals-against; GAA = Goals-against average; SO = Shutouts; SA = Shots against; SV = Shots saved;SV% = Save percentage;

== Draft picks ==
New York's picks at the 1969 NHL amateur draft in Montreal, Canada.

Round	#	Player	Position	Nationality	College/Junior/Club team (League)
1	8	Andre Dupont	D	Canada	Montreal Junior Canadiens (OHA)
1	12	Pierre Jarry	LW	Canada	Ottawa 67's (OHA)
2	23	Bert Wilson	LW	Canada	London Knights (OHA)
3	35	Kevin Morrison	LW	Canada	Saint-Jérôme Alouettes (QMJHL)
4	47	Bruce Hellemond	LW	Canada	Moose Jaw Canucks (SJHL)
5	59	Gord Smith	D	Canada	Cornwall Royals (QMJHL)

== See also ==
- 1969–70 NHL season
