= 1969–70 Boston Bruins season =

NHL team season

1969–70 Boston Bruins
- Stanley Cup champions
- Division: 2nd East
- 1969–70 record: 40–17–19
- Home record: 27–3–8
- Road record: 13–14–11
- Goals for: 277 (1st)
- Goals against: 216 (6th)

Team information
- General manager: Milt Schmidt
- Coach: Harry Sinden
- Captain: Vacant
- Alternate captains: Johnny Bucyk; Phil Esposito; Ed Westfall
- Arena: Boston Garden

Team leaders
- Goals: Phil Esposito (43)
- Assists: Bobby Orr (87)
- Points: Bobby Orr (120)
- Penalty minutes: Bobby Orr (125)
- Wins: Gerry Cheevers (24)
- Goals against average: Gerry Cheevers (2.72)

The 1969–70 Boston Bruins season was the Bruins' 46th season in the NHL. The Bruins were coming off of a successful season in 1968–69, as they finished with a franchise record 100 points, sitting in 2nd place in the Eastern Division, however, they would lose to the Montreal Canadiens in the Eastern Division finals. This year, the Bruins would go all the way to the Stanley Cup Finals and win the Stanley Cup.

== Regular season ==
The year was marred by an infamous incident in a preseason game against the St. Louis Blues, when veteran Ted Green had an ugly stick fight with Wayne Maki of the Blues. Green suffered a fractured skull and a brain injury as a result of the fight, necessitating a permanent steel plate put in his head and missing the entirety of the season. Both were charged with assault as a result of the incident, the first time NHL players faced criminal charges as a result of on-ice violence, and were eventually acquitted.

Boston got off to a quick start, going unbeaten in their first 7 games (6–0–1), which immediately was followed by a 5-game winless streak. The Bruins though would snap out of their mini-slump, and never have a 2-game losing streak for the remainder of the season, finishing the year with a 40–17–19 record, earning 99 points, which tied the Chicago Black Hawks for 1st place in the Eastern Division. Chicago was awarded 1st place though due to having more wins than Boston, as the Hawks recorded 45.

Bobby Orr had a breakout season, leading the league with 120 points, becoming the first defenseman in league history to record over 100 points, while setting an NHL record with 87 assists. Orr also scored 33 goals, which also was a record by a defenseman. Orr also provided toughness, leading the Bruins with 125 PIM. Phil Esposito had another very strong season, scoring 43 goals and earning 99 points, while John McKenzie registered 70 points. Thirty-four-year-old John Bucyk scored a career high 31 goals and tied his career best with 69 points.

In goal, Gerry Cheevers received the majority of playing time, winning a team high 24 games, and having a team best 2.72 GAA and 4 shutouts. Eddie Johnston was his backup, as he won 16 games, had a 2.98 GAA, and 3 shutouts.

=== Season standings ===
East Division
		GP	W	L	T	GF	GA	DIFF	Pts
1	Chicago Black Hawks	76	45	22	9	250	170	+80	99
2	Boston Bruins	76	40	17	19	277	216	+61	99
3	Detroit Red Wings	76	40	21	15	246	199	+47	95
4	New York Rangers	76	38	22	16	246	189	+57	92
5	Montreal Canadiens	76	38	22	16	244	201	+43	92
6	Toronto Maple Leafs	76	29	34	13	222	242	−20	71

=== Record vs. opponents ===
==== Vs. East Division ====
1969–70 NHL records
Team	BOS	CHI	DET	MTL	NYR	TOR	Total
Boston	—	3–3–2	1–2–5	2–3–3	4–4	4–3–1	14–15–11
Chicago	3–3–2	—	4–4	4–4	4–1–3	4–3–1	19–15–6
Detroit	2–1–5	4–4	—	4–2–2	2–4–2	6–2	18–13–9
Montreal	3–2–3	4–4	2–4–2	—	4–3–1	4–1–3	17–14–9
New York	4–4	1–4–3	4–2–2	3–4–1	—	6–2	18–16–6
Toronto	3–4–1	3–4–1	2–6	1–4–3	2–6	—	11–24–5

==== Vs. West Division ====
1969–70 NHL records
Team	LAK	MIN	OAK	PHI	PIT	STL	Total
Boston	5–0–1	4–1–1	5–0–1	4–0–2	5–0–1	3–1–2	26–2–8
Chicago	5–1	3–2–1	3–3	4–0–2	6–0	4–2	25–8–3
Detroit	6–0	1–1–4	4–2	3–1–2	4–2	4–2	22–8–6
Montreal	6–0	2–2–2	3–2–1	4–0–2	4–2	2–2–2	21–8–7
New York	4–1–1	3–1–2	5–1	0–0–6	4–1–1	4–2	20–6–10
Toronto	3–1–2	2–2–2	4–1–1	3–2–1	2–2–2	4–2	18–10–8

== Schedule and results ==
1969–70 regular season
October

Game	Date	Visitor	Score	Home	Record	Pts
1	October 12	New York Rangers	1–2	Boston Bruins	1–0–0	2
2	October 15	Oakland Seals	0–6	Boston Bruins	2–0–0	4
3	October 18	Boston Bruins	3–3	Pittsburgh Penguins	2–0–1	5
4	October 19	Pittsburgh Penguins	0–4	Boston Bruins	3–0–1	7
5	October 22	Boston Bruins	3–2	Minnesota North Stars	4–0–1	9
6	October 24	Boston Bruins	4–2	Oakland Seals	5–0–1	11
7	October 25	Boston Bruins	3–2	Los Angeles Kings	6–0–1	13
8	October 29	Boston Bruins	2–4	Toronto Maple Leafs	6–1–1	13

November

Game	Date	Visitor	Score	Home	Record	Pts
9	November 1	Boston Bruins	2–9	Montreal Canadiens	6–2–1	13
10	November 2	Toronto Maple Leafs	4–4	Boston Bruins	6–2–2	14
11	November 5	St. Louis Blues	4–4	Boston Bruins	6–2–3	15
12	November 8	Boston Bruins	2–3	Detroit Red Wings	6–3–3	15
13	November 10	Oakland Seals	3–8	Boston Bruins	7–3–3	17
14	November 13	Detroit Red Wings	1–3	Boston Bruins	8–3–3	19
15	November 15	New York Rangers	6–5	Boston Bruins	8–4–3	19
16	November 16	Los Angeles Kings	4–7	Boston Bruins	9–4–3	21
17	November 21	Boston Bruins	2–2	Chicago Black Hawks	9–4–4	22
18	November 23	Montreal Canadiens	2–2	Boston Bruins	9–4–5	23
19	November 26	Boston Bruins	0–3	New York Rangers	9–5–5	23
20	November 27	Philadelphia Flyers	4–6	Boston Bruins	10–5–5	25
21	November 29	Boston Bruins	2–2	Montreal Canadiens	10–5–6	26
22	November 30	Toronto Maple Leafs	1–4	Boston Bruins	11–5–6	28

December

Game	Date	Visitor	Score	Home	Record	Pts
23	December 4	Boston Bruins	4–4	Detroit Red Wings	11–5–7	29
24	December 6	Chicago Black Hawks	1–6	Boston Bruins	12–5–7	31
25	December 7	Minnesota North Stars	2–2	Boston Bruins	12–5–8	32
26	December 10	Boston Bruins	2–5	New York Rangers	12–6–8	32
27	December 11	New York Rangers	1–2	Boston Bruins	13–6–8	34
28	December 13	Boston Bruins	5–3	Philadelphia Flyers	14–6–8	36
29	December 14	Pittsburgh Penguins	1–2	Boston Bruins	15–6–8	38
30	December 18	Boston Bruins	3–3	St. Louis Blues	15–6–9	39
31	December 20	Boston Bruins	6–4	Pittsburgh Penguins	16–6–9	41
32	December 21	Montreal Canadiens	5–2	Boston Bruins	16–7–9	41
33	December 25	Los Angeles Kings	1–7	Boston Bruins	17–7–9	43
34	December 28	Boston Bruins	5–4	Philadelphia Flyers	18–7–9	45
35	December 31	Boston Bruins	1–5	Detroit Red Wings	18–8–9	45

January

Game	Date	Visitor	Score	Home	Record	Pts
36	January 3	Boston Bruins	6–2	Los Angeles Kings	19–8–9	47
37	January 7	Boston Bruins	6–1	Oakland Seals	20–8–9	49
38	January 10	Boston Bruins	3–4	Toronto Maple Leafs	20–9–9	49
39	January 11	Oakland Seals	3–6	Boston Bruins	21–9–9	51
40	January 15	Los Angeles Kings	3–6	Boston Bruins	22–9–9	53
41	January 17	Chicago Black Hawks	1–0	Boston Bruins	22–10–9	53
42	January 18	Montreal Canadiens	3–6	Boston Bruins	23–10–9	55
43	January 22	Philadelphia Flyers	3–3	Boston Bruins	23–10–10	56
44	January 24	Boston Bruins	1–8	New York Rangers	23–11–10	56
45	January 25	Pittsburgh Penguins	1–3	Boston Bruins	24–11–10	58
46	January 29	Minnesota North Stars	5–6	Boston Bruins	25–11–10	60
47	January 31	Boston Bruins	3–3	Montreal Canadiens	25–11–11	61

February

Game	Date	Visitor	Score	Home	Record	Pts
48	February 1	Toronto Maple Leafs	6–7	Boston Bruins	26–11–11	63
49	February 4	Boston Bruins	4–8	Chicago Black Hawks	26–12–11	63
50	February 5	Philadelphia Flyers	1–5	Boston Bruins	27–12–11	65
51	February 7	Detroit Red Wings	2–2	Boston Bruins	27–12–12	66
52	February 8	St. Louis Blues	1–7	Boston Bruins	28–12–12	68
53	February 11	Boston Bruins	3–2	St. Louis Blues	29–12–12	70
54	February 14	Boston Bruins	3–0	Pittsburgh Penguins	30–12–12	72
55	February 17	Boston Bruins	3–3	Oakland Seals	30–12–13	73
56	February 18	Boston Bruins	5–5	Los Angeles Kings	30–12–14	74
57	February 21	Boston Bruins	4–2	Minnesota North Stars	31–12–14	76
58	February 22	Boston Bruins	3–6	Chicago Black Hawks	31–13–14	76
59	February 26	New York Rangers	3–5	Boston Bruins	32–13–14	78
60	February 28	Chicago Black Hawks	0–3	Boston Bruins	33–13–14	80

March

Game	Date	Visitor	Score	Home	Record	Pts
61	March 1	St. Louis Blues	1–3	Boston Bruins	34–13–14	82
62	March 4	Boston Bruins	1–3	St. Louis Blues	34–14–14	82
63	March 7	Boston Bruins	5–5	Philadelphia Flyers	34–14–15	83
64	March 8	Montreal Canadiens	0–2	Boston Bruins	35–14–15	85
65	March 11	Boston Bruins	0–0	Chicago Black Hawks	35–14–16	86
66	March 14	Boston Bruins	1–2	Toronto Maple Leafs	35–15–16	86
67	March 15	Detroit Red Wings	5–5	Boston Bruins	35–15–17	87
68	March 19	Chicago Black Hawks	1–3	Boston Bruins	36–15–17	89
69	March 21	Boston Bruins	4–5	Minnesota North Stars	36–16–17	89
70	March 22	Minnesota North Stars	0–5	Boston Bruins	37–16–17	91
71	March 25	Boston Bruins	3–1	New York Rangers	38–16–17	93
72	March 28	Detroit Red Wings	5–5	Boston Bruins	38–16–18	94
73	March 29	Boston Bruins	2–2	Detroit Red Wings	38–16–19	95

April

Game	Date	Visitor	Score	Home	Record	Pts
74	April 1	Boston Bruins	3–6	Montreal Canadiens	38–17–19	95
75	April 4	Boston Bruins	4–2	Toronto Maple Leafs	39–17–19	97
76	April 5	Toronto Maple Leafs	1–3	Boston Bruins	40–17–19	99

Legend: Win (2 points) Loss (0 points) Tie (1 point)

== Playoffs ==
In the playoffs, Boston faced the New York Rangers in the quarterfinals, which finished in 4th place in the Eastern Division with 92 points, seven less than the Bruins. The series opened at the Boston Garden, and the Bruins continued their winning ways at home, taking the first two games to take an early series lead. The series then moved to Madison Square Garden in New York for the next two games, and the Rangers responded with two close wins, tying the series up at two games each. Boston returned home for game 5, and took a 3–2 series lead with a hard-fought 3–2 win, going on to beat the Rangers in game 6 on the road 4–1 to advance to the Eastern Division finals.

The Bruins opponent for the division finals was the Chicago Black Hawks, which finished with 99 points (the same as Boston, but with more wins, so Chicago was awarded home ice for the series). Boston surprised the Chicago fans by taking the first two games held at Chicago Stadium with relative ease to take a 2–0 series lead. Boston then won game 3 by a 5–2 score at the Boston Garden, taking a commanding 3–0 lead in the series. The Black Hawks kept game 4 close, but lost the game 5–4, as Boston swept Chicago to advance to the Stanley Cup Finals for the first time since 1958.

Boston Bruins vs. St. Louis Blues

Boston faced the winner of the Western Division, the St. Louis Blues, making its 3rd straight Stanley Cup Finals appearance. The Blues had been swept by the Montreal Canadiens in both their previous appearances in the Finals. St. Louis defeated the Minnesota North Stars and Pittsburgh Penguins to reach the Finals. The series opened at the St. Louis Arena, and the Bruins had no problems at all in their first two games, defeating the Blues by scores of 6–1 and 6–2 to take a 2–0 series lead. The series shifted to Boston for the next two games, and the Bruins dominated game 3, winning 4–1. St. Louis forced the 4th game into sudden death; however the Bruins, on an overtime goal by Bobby Orr, won 4–3, thus winning an NHL record 10th straight playoff game and their first Stanley Cup since 1941. The still photo of Orr flying through the air after scoring "The Goal" — he had been tripped in the act of shooting by Blues defenseman Noel Picard — became one of the most iconic images of hockey history, and was the basis of a bronze sculpture of the event outside the TD Garden's main entrance in 2010, the date of the event's 40th anniversary.

1970 Stanley Cup playoffs
Quarterfinals vs. (E4) New York Rangers – Bruins win 4–2

Game	Date	Visitor	Score	Home	Record
1	April 8	New York Rangers	2–8	Boston Bruins	1–0
2	April 9	New York Rangers	3–5	Boston Bruins	2–0
3	April 11	Boston Bruins	3–4	New York Rangers	2–1
4	April 12	Boston Bruins	2–4	New York Rangers	2–2
5	April 14	New York Rangers	2–3	Boston Bruins	3–2
6	April 16	Boston Bruins	4–1	New York Rangers	4–2

Semifinals vs. (E1) Chicago Black Hawks – Bruins win 4–0

Game	Date	Visitor	Score	Home	Record
1	April 19	Boston Bruins	6–3	Chicago Black Hawks	1–0
2	April 21	Boston Bruins	4–1	Chicago Black Hawks	2–0
3	April 23	Chicago Black Hawks	2–5	Boston Bruins	3–0
4	April 26	Chicago Black Hawks	4–5	Boston Bruins	4–0

Stanley Cup Finals vs. (W1) St. Louis Blues – Bruins win 4–0

Game	Date	Visitor	Score	Home	Record
1	May 3	Boston Bruins	6–1	St. Louis Blues	1–0
2	May 5	Boston Bruins	6–2	St. Louis Blues	2–0
3	May 7	St. Louis Blues	1–4	Boston Bruins	3–0
4	May 10	St. Louis Blues	3–4	Boston Bruins	4–0

Legend: Win Loss

== Player statistics ==
=== Regular season ===
Scoring

= Indicates league leader

Player	Pos	GP	G	A	Pts	PIM	PPG	SHG	GWG
Bobby Orr	D	76	33	87	120	125	11	4	3
Phil Esposito	C	76	43	56	99	50	18	1	5
John McKenzie	RW	72	29	41	70	114	9	1	6
John Bucyk	LW	76	31	38	69	13	14	0	6
Fred Stanfield	LW	73	23	35	58	14	13	0	3
Ken Hodge	RW	72	25	29	54	87	6	0	5
Derek Sanderson	C	50	18	23	41	118	5	5	2
Ed Westfall	D/RW	72	14	22	36	28	0	0	0
Wayne Cashman	LW	70	9	26	35	79	0	0	1
Wayne Carleton	LW	42	6	19	25	23	0	0	1
Dallas Smith	D	75	7	17	24	119	1	1	1
Jim Lorentz	C/RW	68	7	16	23	30	2	0	0
Garnet Bailey	LW	58	11	11	22	82	2	0	2
Don Awrey	D	73	3	10	13	120	0	0	0
Don Marcotte	LW	35	9	3	12	14	0	0	1
Rick Smith	D	69	2	8	10	65	0	0	1
Gary Doak	D	44	1	7	8	63	0	0	1
Ron Murphy	LW	20	2	5	7	8	0	0	2
Jim Harrison	C	23	3	1	4	16	0	1	0
Bill Speer	D	27	1	3	4	4	0	0	0
Eddie Johnston	G	37	0	2	2	2	0	0	0
Tom Webster	RW	2	0	1	1	2	0	0	0
Nick Beverley	D	2	0	0	0	2	0	0	0
Gerry Cheevers	G	41	0	0	0	4	0	0	0
Bill Lesuk	LW	3	0	0	0	0	0	0	0
Frank Spring	RW	1	0	0	0	0	0	0	0
Barry Wilkins	D	6	0	0	0	2	0	0	0

Goaltending

Player	MIN	GP	W	L	T	GA	GAA	SO
Gerry Cheevers	2384	41	24	8	8	108	2.72	4
Eddie Johnston	2176	37	16	9	11	108	2.98	3
Team:	4560	76	40	17	19	216	2.84	7

=== Playoffs ===
Scoring

Player	Pos	GP	G	A	Pts	PIM	PPG	SHG	GWG
Phil Esposito	C	14	13	14	27	16	4	0	2
Bobby Orr	D	14	9	11	20	14	3	1	2
John Bucyk	LW	14	11	8	19	2	4	0	1
John McKenzie	RW	14	5	12	17	35	0	0	3
Fred Stanfield	LW	14	4	12	16	6	2	0	0
Ken Hodge	RW	14	3	10	13	7	0	0	1
Wayne Cashman	LW	14	5	4	9	50	0	0	2
Derek Sanderson	C	14	5	4	9	72	1	2	0
Ed Westfall	D/RW	14	3	5	8	4	0	1	1
Wayne Carleton	LW	14	2	4	6	14	0	0	0
Don Awrey	D	14	0	5	5	32	0	0	0
Rick Smith	D	14	1	3	4	17	0	0	0
Dallas Smith	D	14	0	3	3	19	0	0	0
Don Marcotte	LW	14	2	0	2	11	0	1	0
Jim Lorentz	C/RW	11	1	0	1	4	0	0	0
Bill Speer	D	8	1	0	1	4	0	0	0
Gerry Cheevers	G	13	0	1	1	2	0	0	0
Gary Doak	D	8	0	0	0	9	0	0	0
Eddie Johnston	G	1	0	0	0	2	0	0	0
Bill Lesuk	LW	2	0	0	0	0	0	0	0
Danny Schock	LW	1	0	0	0	0	0	0	0

Goaltending

Player	MIN	GP	W	L	GA	GAA	SO
Gerry Cheevers	781	13	12	1	29	2.23	0
Eddie Johnston	60	1	0	1	4	4.00	0
Team:	841	14	12	2	33	2.35	0

Note:

Pos = Position;GP = Games played; G = Goals; A = Assists; Pts = Points; PIM = Penalty minutes; +/- = Plus/minus; PPG = Power-play goals; SHG = Short-handed goals; GWG = Game-winning goals
Pos = Position;GP = Games played; Min, TOI = Minutes played; W = Wins; L = Losses; T,T/OT = Ties; OTL = Overtime losses; GA = Goals-against; GAA = Goals-against average; SO = Shutouts; SA = Shots against; SV = Shots saved;SV% = Save percentage;

== Awards and records ==
- Bobby Orr, Art Ross Trophy
- Bobby Orr, Conn Smythe Trophy
- Bobby Orr, Hart Memorial Trophy
- Bobby Orr, Norris Trophy
- Bobby Orr, NHL Plus/Minus Award
- Bobby Orr, NHL Record, Plus/Minus +124
- In 2010 the team was given the hockey legacy Award from The Sports Museum at TD Garden.

== Draft picks ==
Boston's draft picks at the 1969 NHL amateur draft

Round	#	Player	Nationality	College/Junior/Club team (League)
1	3	Don Tannahill	Canada	Niagara Falls Flyers (OHA)
1	4	Frank Spring	Canada	Edmonton Oil Kings (WCHL)
1	11	Ivan Boldirev	Yugoslavia	Oshawa Generals (OHA)
2	22	Art Quoquochi	Canada	Montreal Junior Canadiens (OHA)
3	34	Nels Jacobson	Canada	Winnipeg Jets (WCHA)
4	46	Ron Fairbrother	Canada	Saskatoon Blades (WCHL)
5	58	Jeremy Wright	Canada	Calgary Centennials (WCHL)
6	69	Jim Jones	Canada	Peterborough Petes (OHA)

== See also ==
- 1969–70 NHL season
