= List of Chicago Blackhawks draft picks =

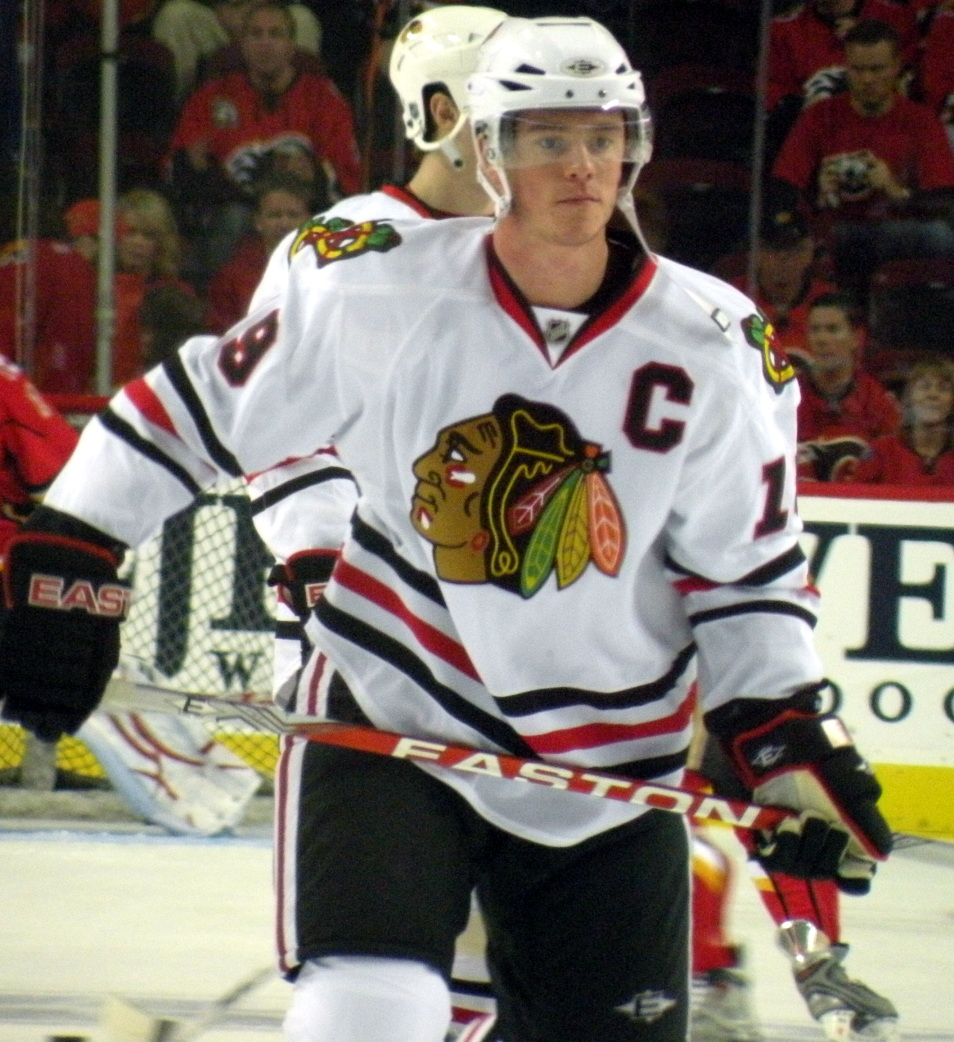
Jonathan Toews was the Blackhawks first round draft pick and third overall in 2006

This is a complete list of ice hockey players who were drafted in the National Hockey League by the Chicago Blackhawks franchise. It includes every player who was drafted, regardless of whether they played for the team.

The NHL entry draft is held each June, allowing teams to select players who have turned 18 years old by September 15 in the year the draft is held. The draft order is determined by the previous season's order of finish, with non-playoff teams drafting first, followed by the teams that made the playoffs, with the specific order determined by the number of points earned by each team. The NHL holds a weighted lottery for the 14 non-playoff teams, allowing the winner to move up a maximum of four positions in the entry draft. The team with the fewest points has the best chance of winning the lottery, with each successive team given a lower chance of moving up in the draft. Between 1986 and 1994, the NHL also held a Supplemental Draft for players in American colleges.

== Key ==
Abbreviations
| Pos | Position | GP | Games played |
| G | Goals | A | Assists |
| Pts | Points | PIM | Penalties in minutes |
| GAA | Goals against average | W | Wins |
| L | Losses | OT | Overtime or shootout losses |
| T | Ties | S | Supplemental |

Positions
| G | Goaltender |
| D | Defenseman |
| LW | Left wing |
| C | Center |
| RW | Right wing |
| F | Forward |

== Draft picks ==
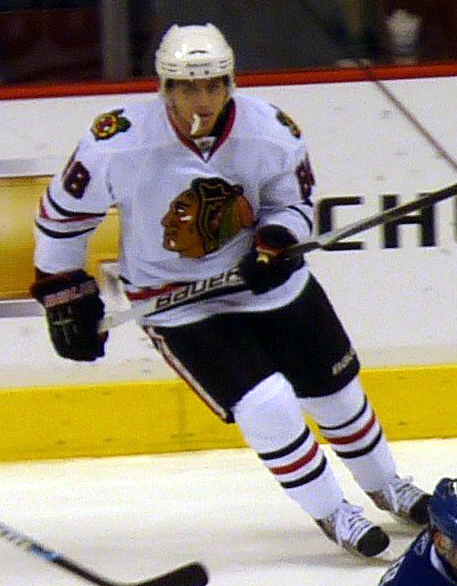
Patrick Kane was taken first overall in 2007

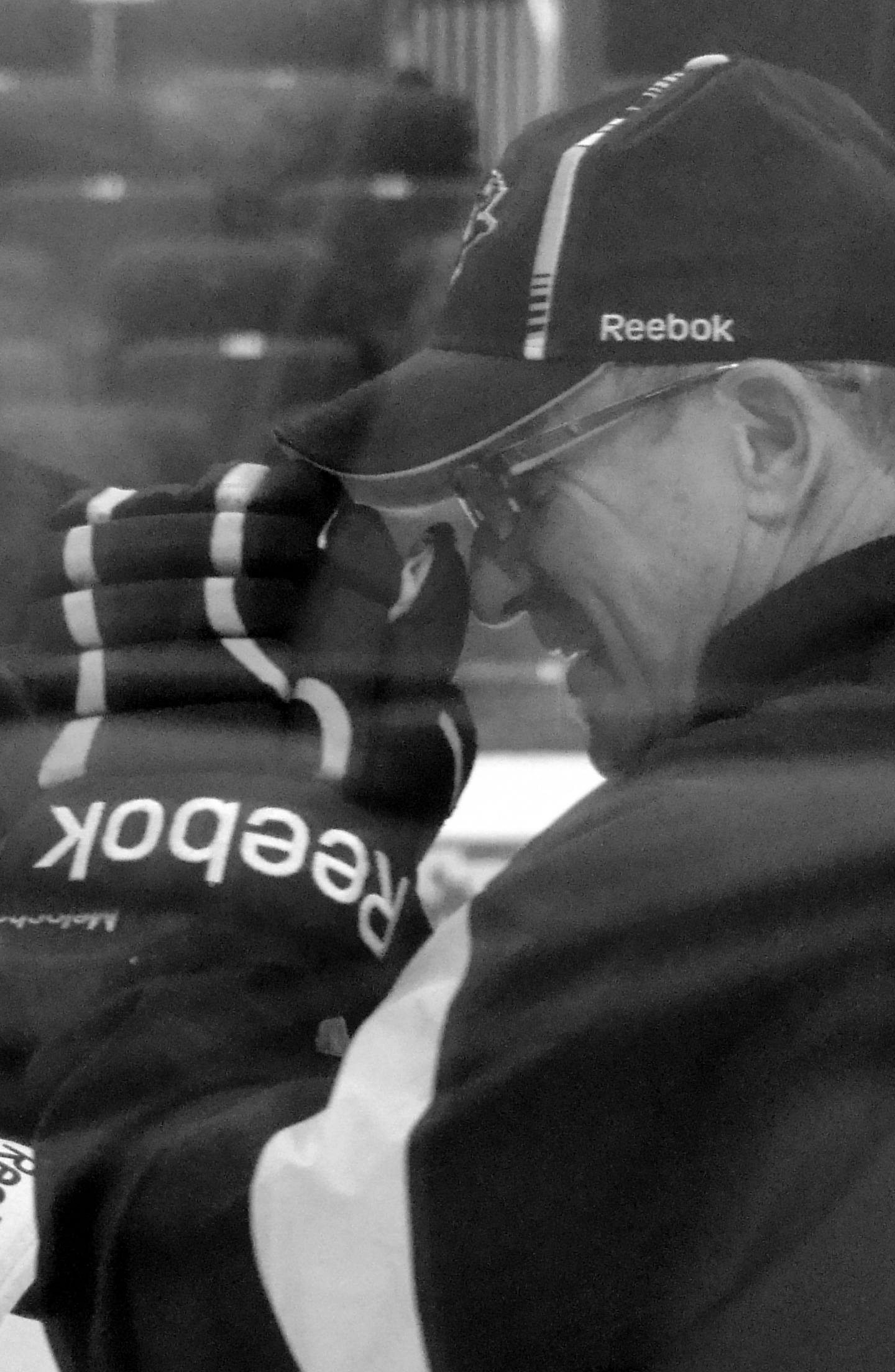
Gilles Meloche was drafted in the fifth round of the 1970 draft

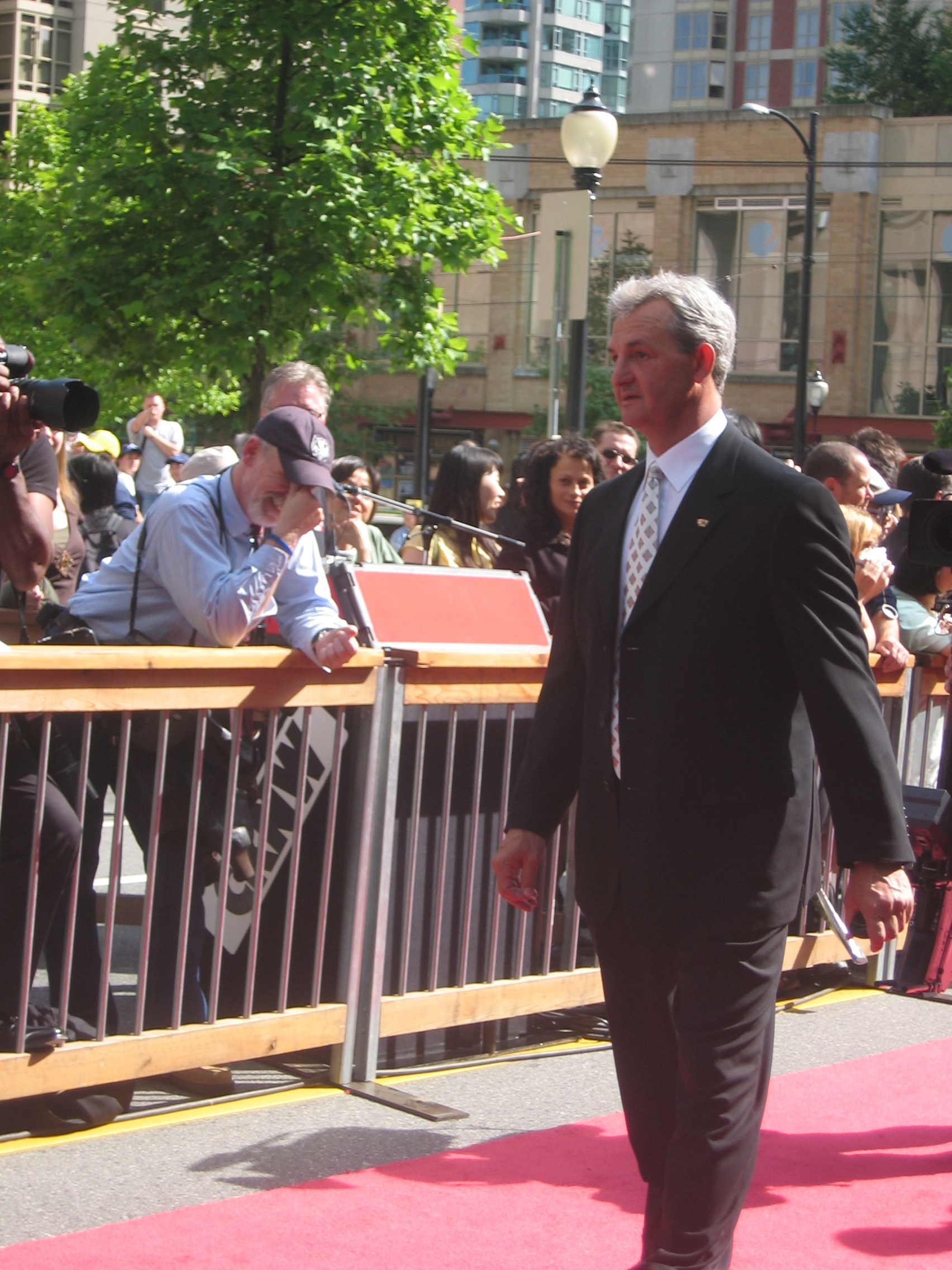
Darryl Sutter was drafted in the eleventh round in 1978

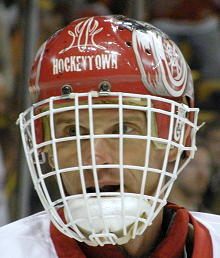
Dominik Hasek was drafted in the tenth round in the 1983 draft

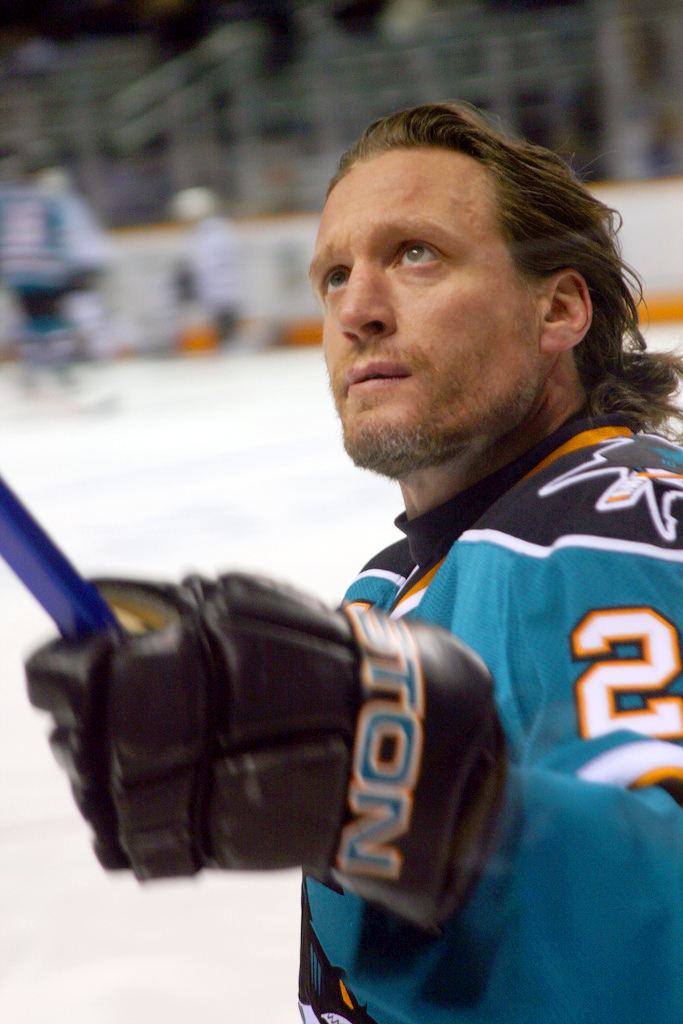
Jeremy Roenick was the Blackhawks first round draft pick in 1988

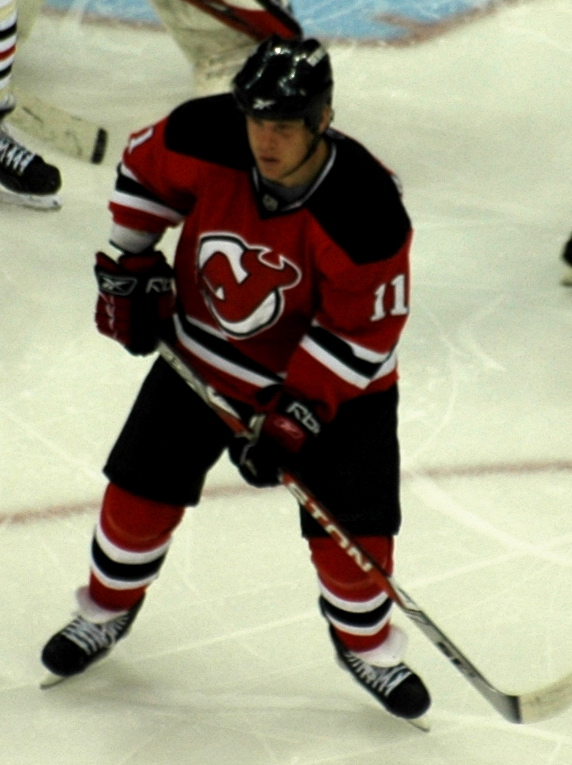
Dean McAmmond was taken 22nd overall in 1991

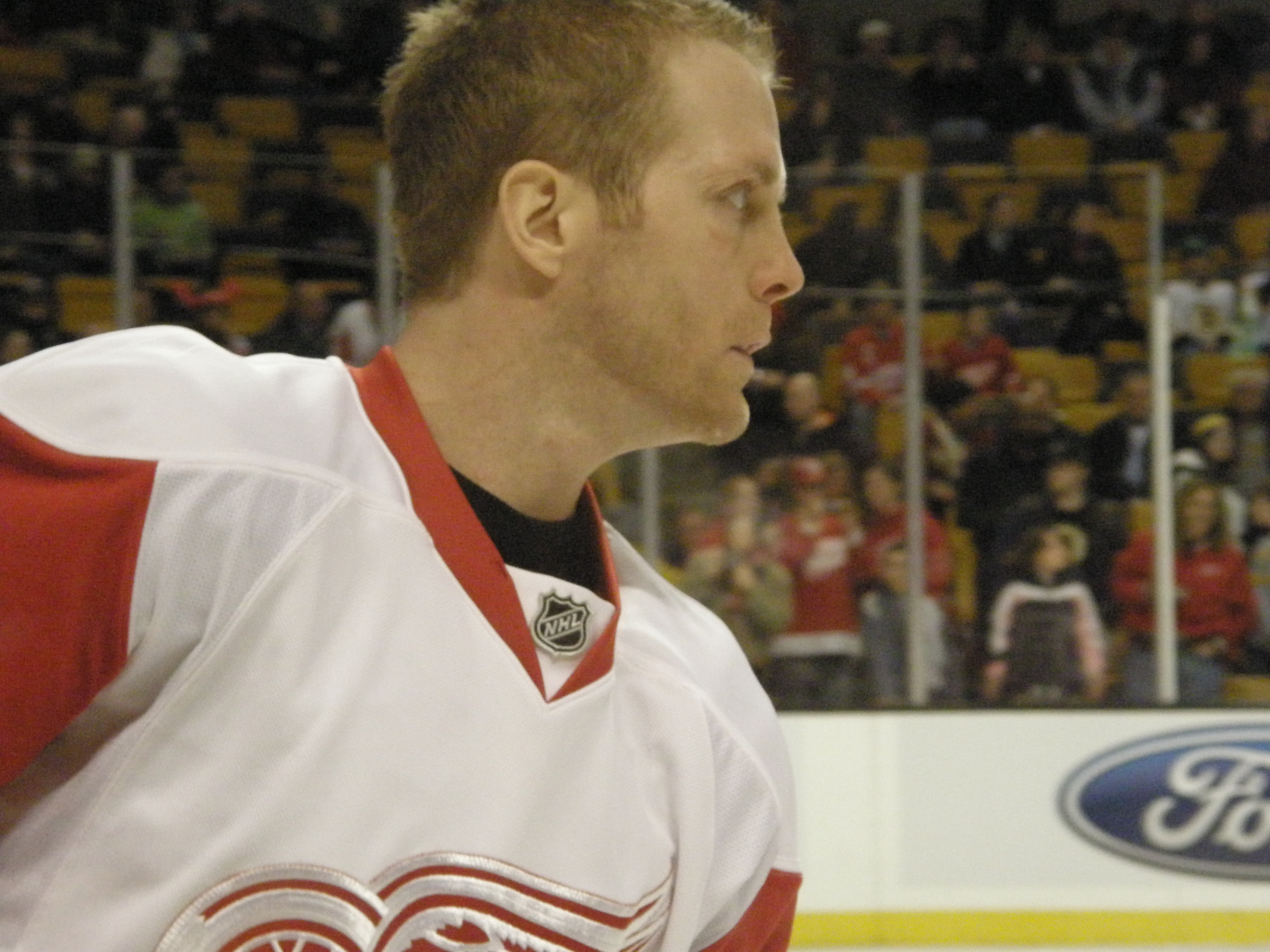
Daniel Cleary was the Blackhawks first round pick in 1997

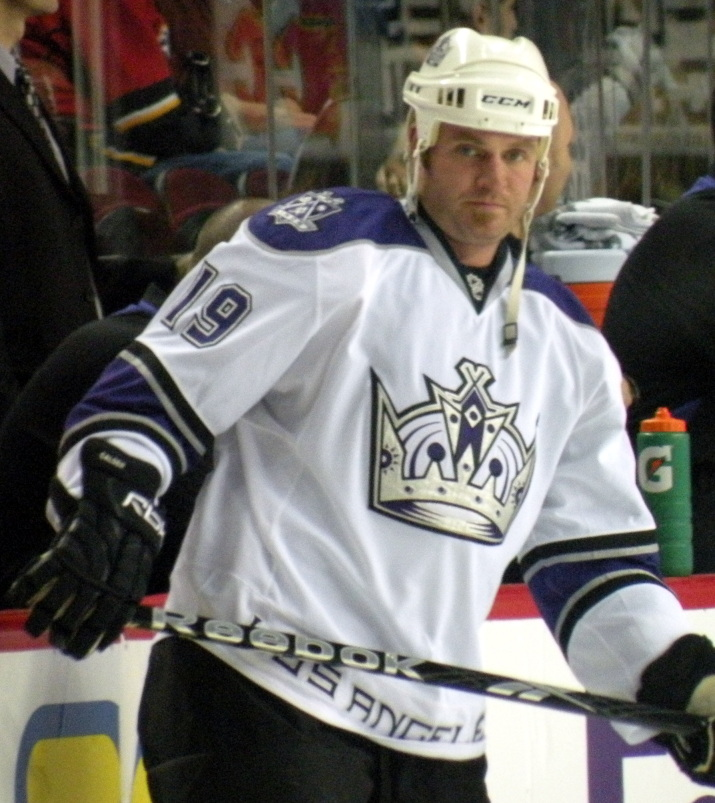
Kyle Calder was selected in the fifth round of the 1997 draft

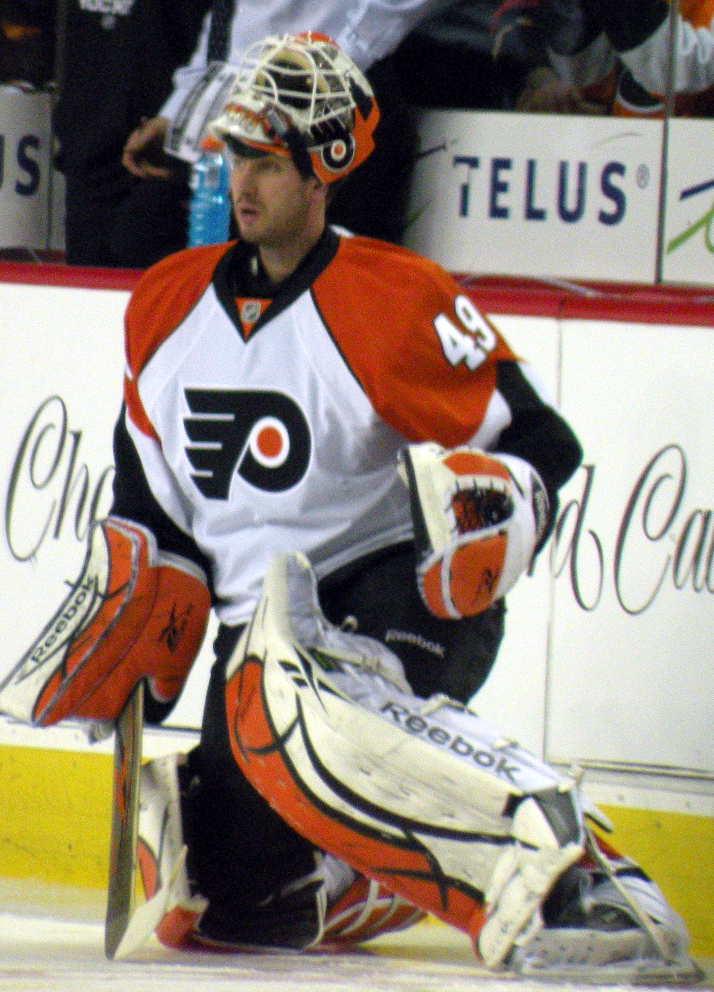
Michael Leighton was selected 165th overall in the 1999 draft

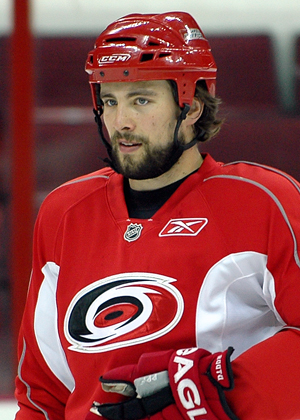
Tuomo Ruutu was the Blackhawks first round pick in 2001

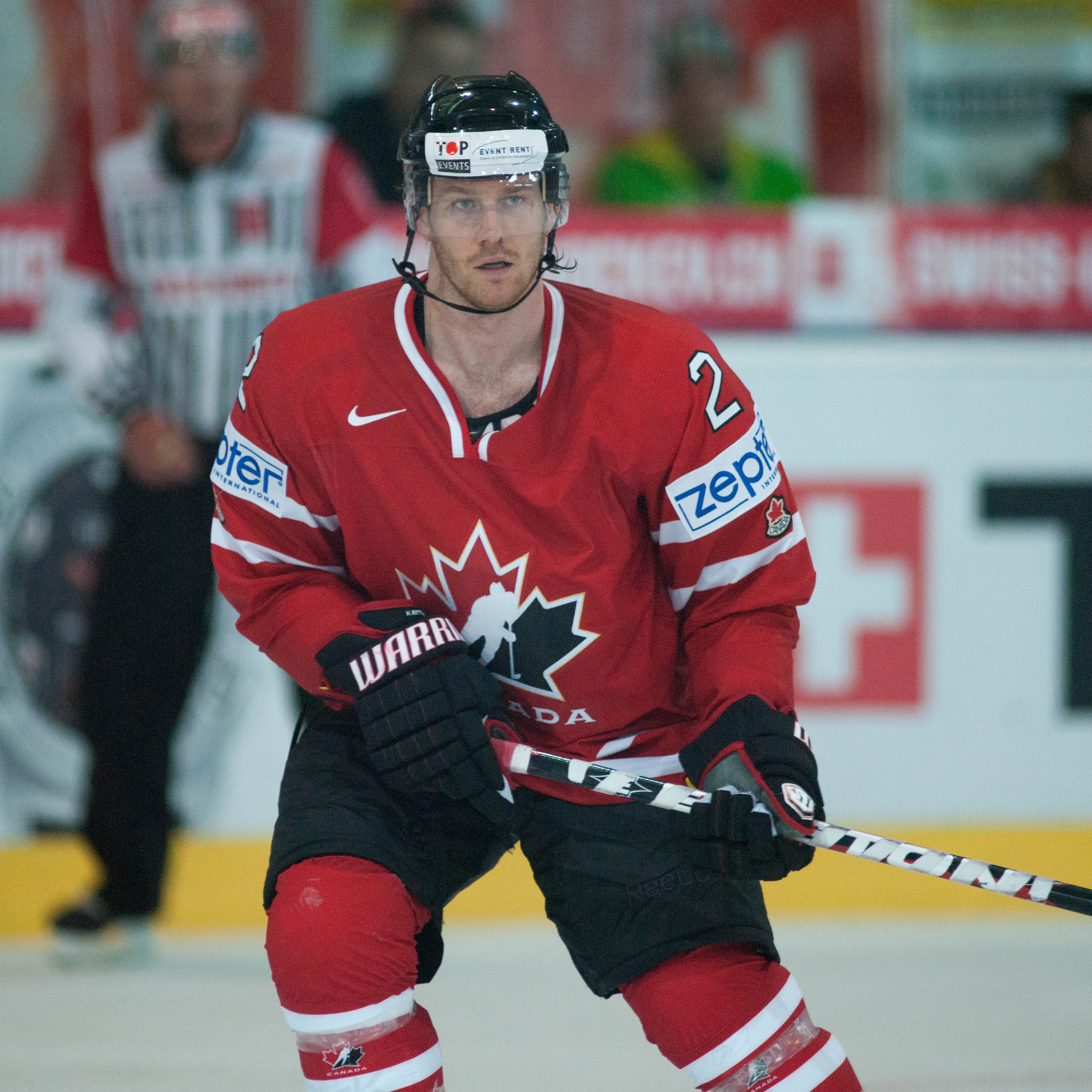
Duncan Keith was the Blackhawks second round pick in 2002

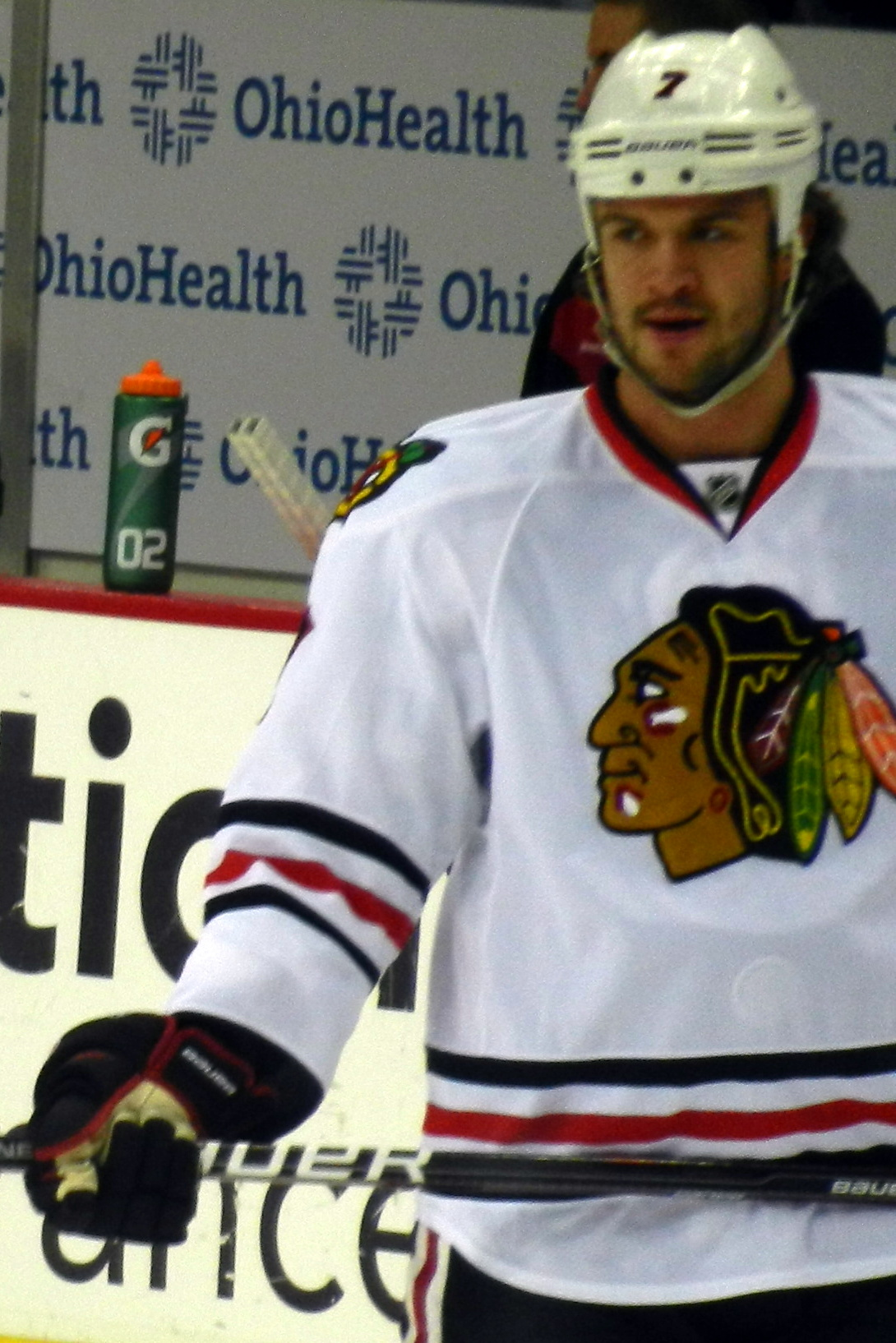
Brent Seabrook was taken 14th overall in 2003

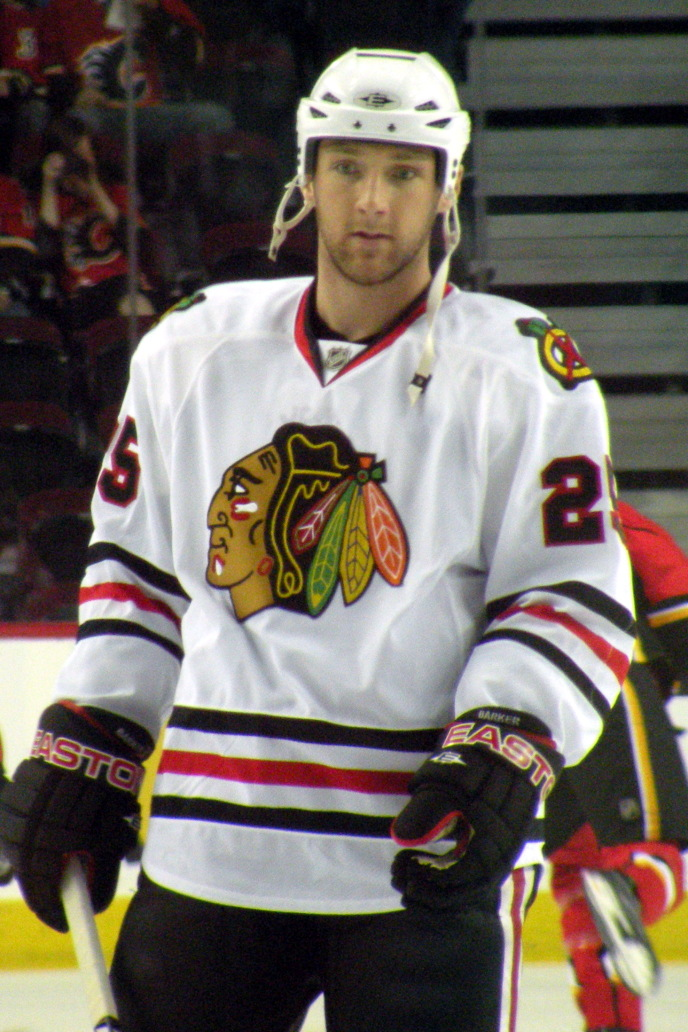
Cam Barker was drafted third overall in 2004

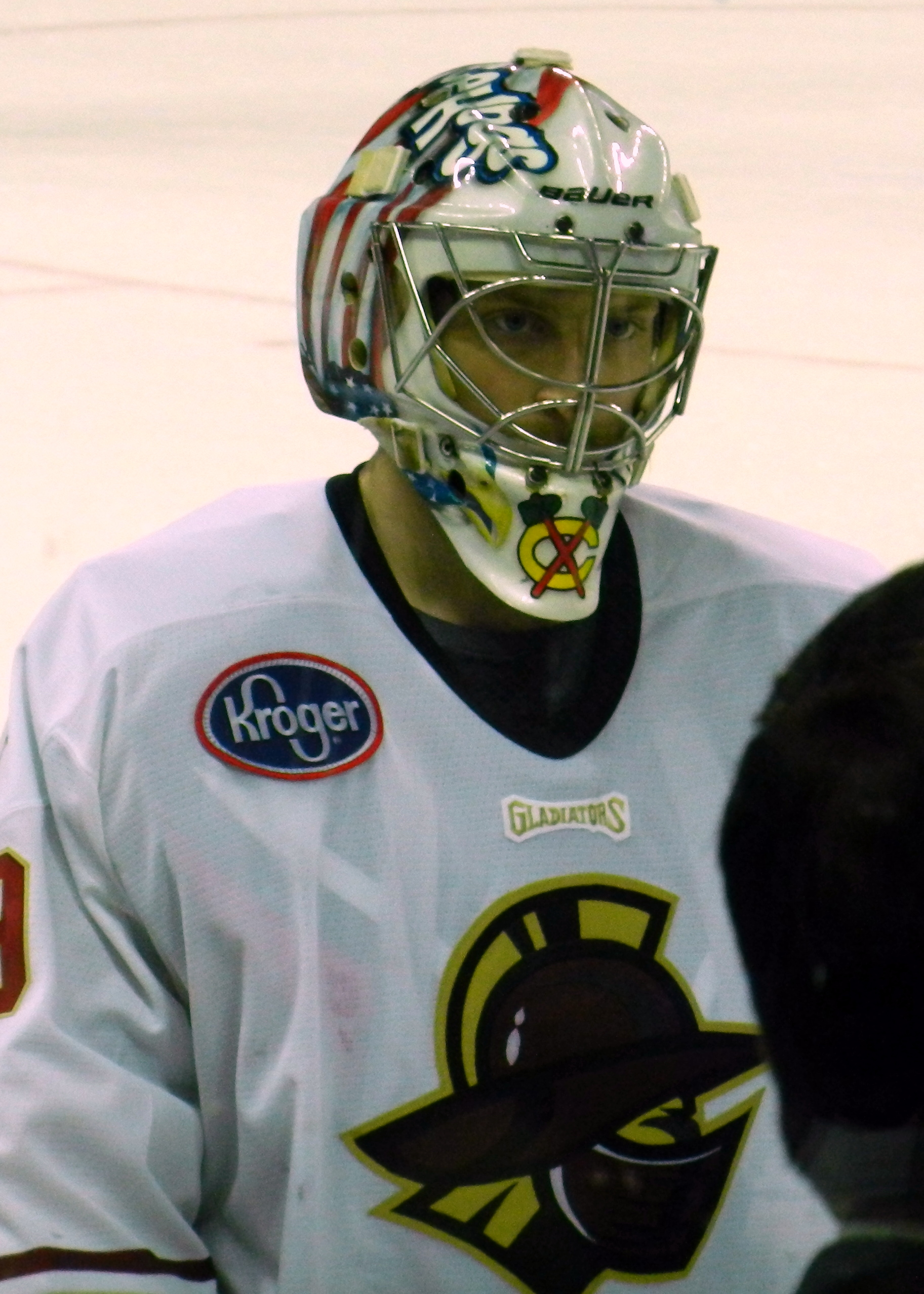
Joe Palmer was selected in the fourth round of the 2006 draft

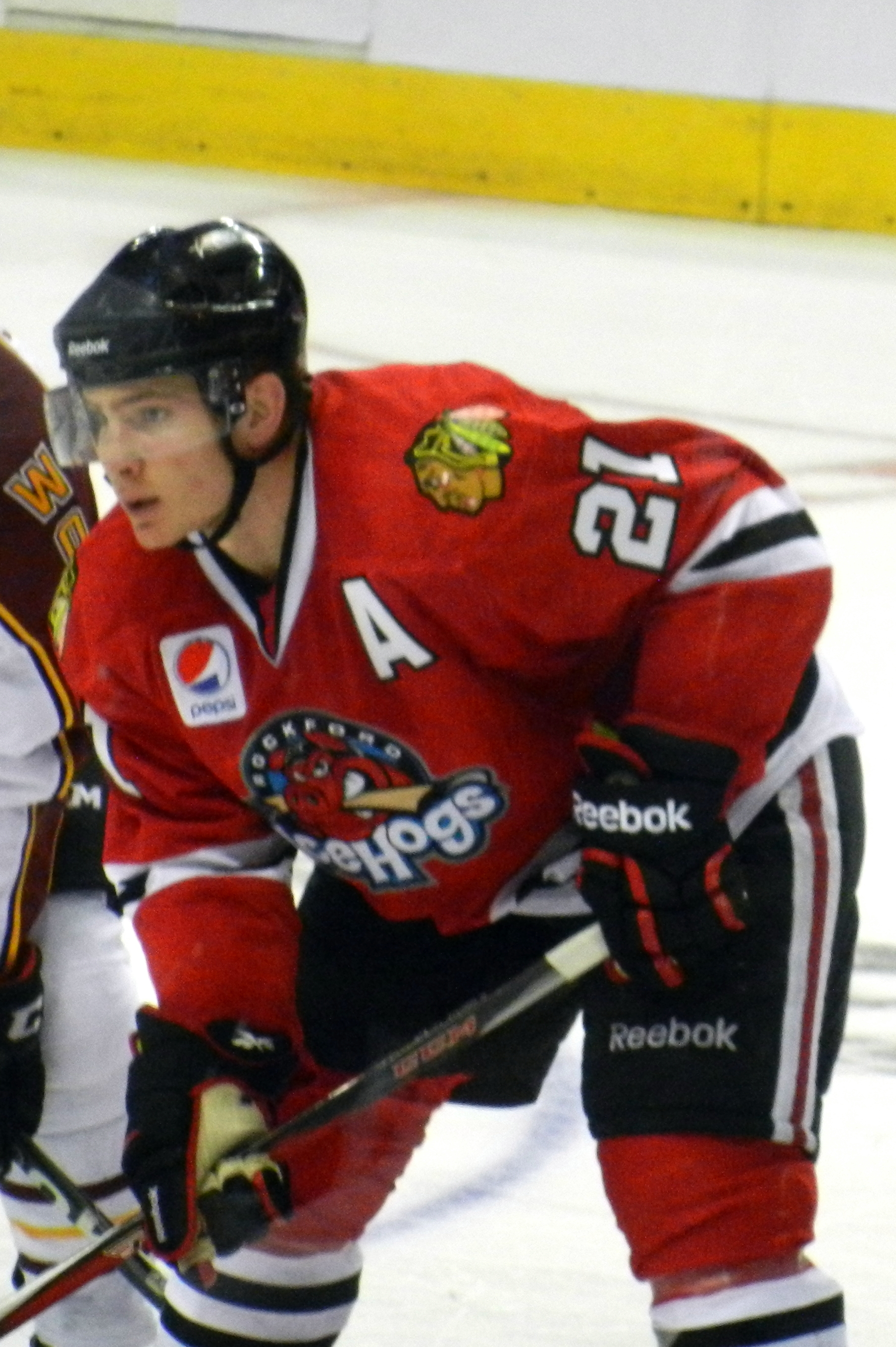
Ben Smith was a sixth round pick in 2008

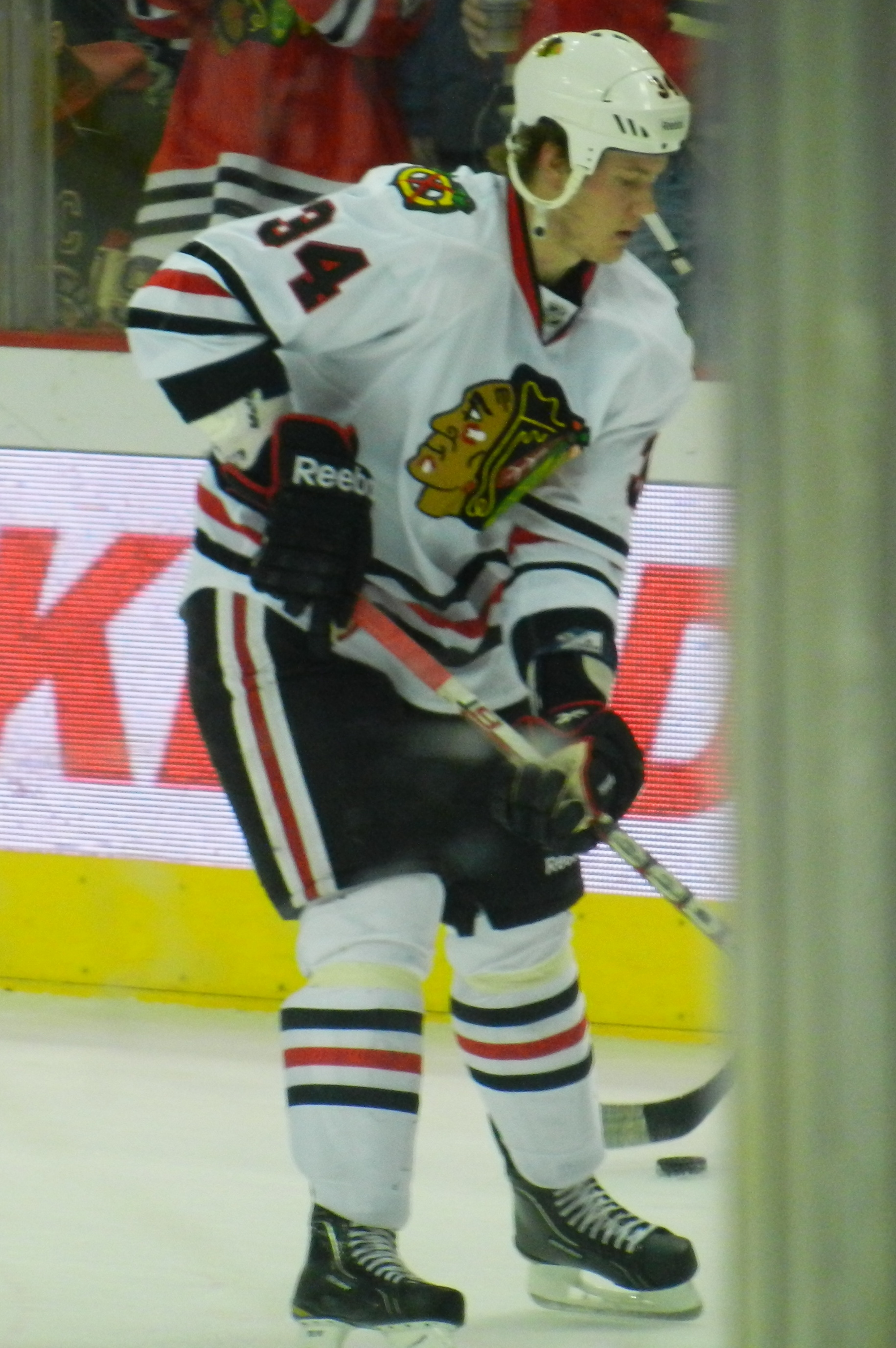
Dylan Olsen was selected 28th overall in 2009

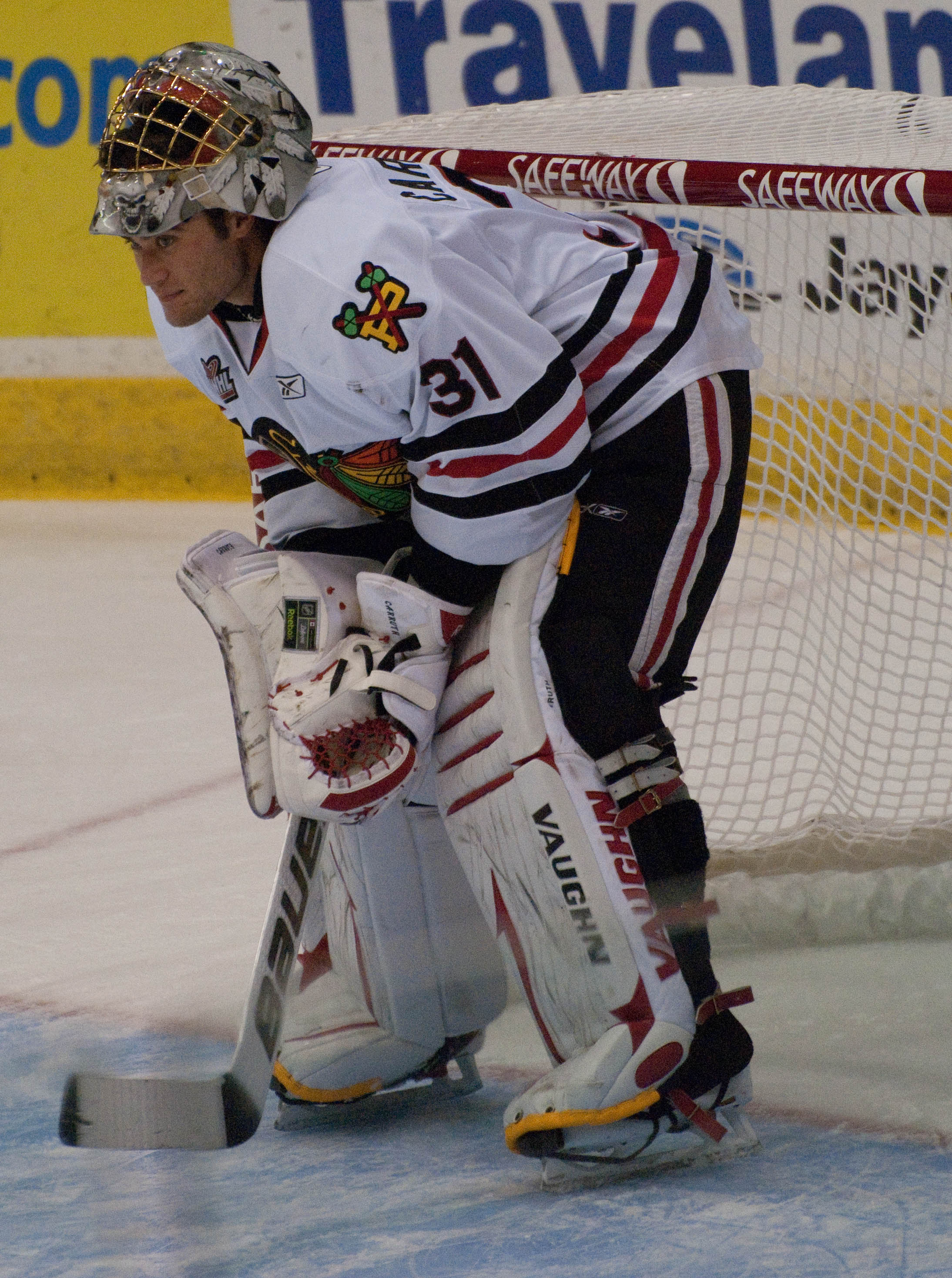
Macmillan Carruth was selected in the seventh round of the 2010 draft

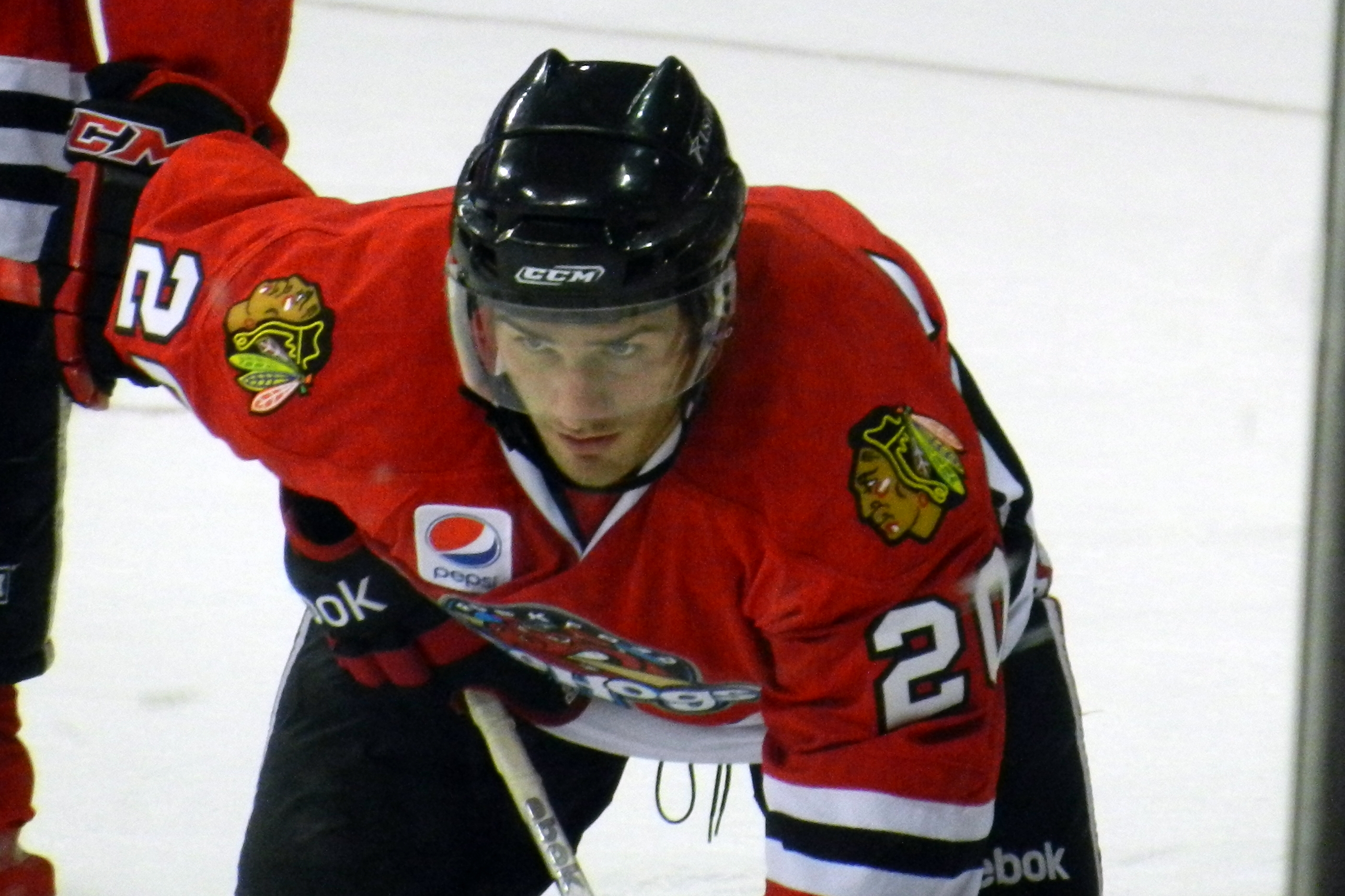
Brandon Saad was selected 43rd overall in 2011

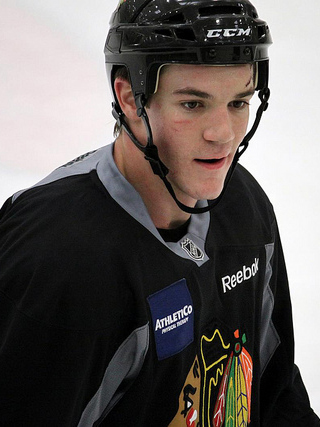
Andrew Shaw was selected in the fifth round of the 2011 draft

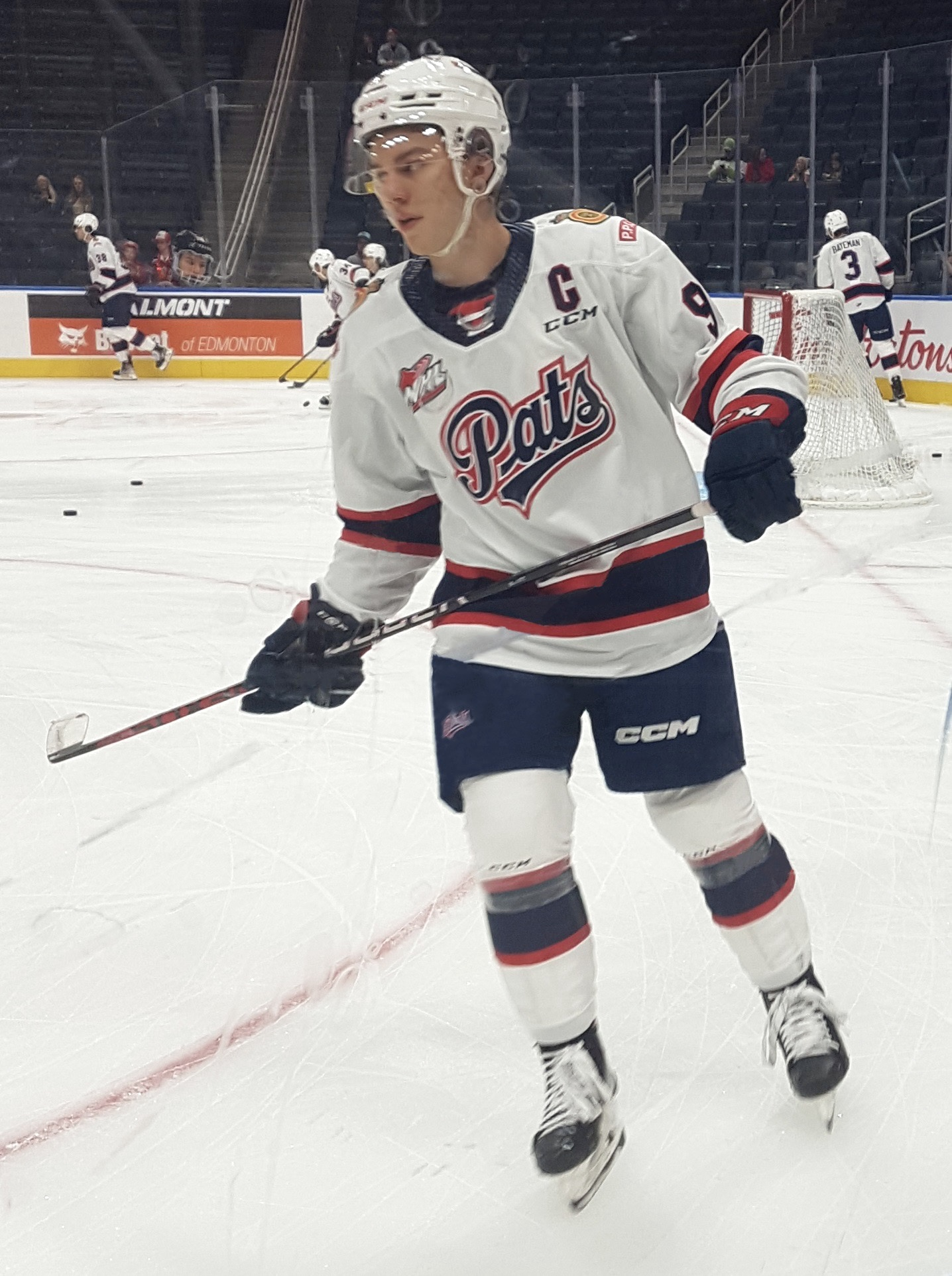
Connor Bedard was selected first overall in 2023

Statistics are complete as of the 2025–26 NHL season and show each player's career regular season totals in the NHL. Wins, losses, ties, overtime losses and goals against average apply to goaltenders and are used only for players at that position. A player listed with a blank under the games played column has not played in the NHL.

| Year | Round | Pick | Player | Nationality | Pos | GP | G | A | Pts | PIM | W | L | T | OT | GAA |
|---|---|---|---|---|---|---|---|---|---|---|---|---|---|---|---|
| 1963 | 1 | 5 | Art Hampson | Canada | D | | | | | | | | | | |
| 1963 | 2 | 11 | Wayne Davidson | Canada | D | | | | | | | | | | |
| 1963 | 3 | 16 | Bill Carson | Canada | D | | | | | | | | | | |
| 1964 | 1 | 4 | Richie Bayes | Canada | C | | | | | | | | | | |
| 1964 | 2 | 10 | Jan Popiel | Denmark | LW | | | | | | | | | | |
| 1964 | 3 | 16 | Carl Hadfield | Canada | RW | | | | | | | | | | |
| 1964 | 4 | 22 | Moe L'Abbe | Canada | C | 5 | 0 | 1 | 1 | 0 | | | | | |
| 1965 | 1 | 2 | Andy Culligan | Canada | F | | | | | | | | | | |
| 1965 | 2 | 7 | Brian McKenney | Canada | RW | | | | | | | | | | |
| 1966 | 1 | 3 | Terry Caffery | Canada | C | 14 | 0 | 0 | 0 | 0 | | | | | |
| 1966 | 2 | 9 | Ron Dussiaume | Canada | LW | | | | | | | | | | |
| 1966 | 3 | 15 | Larry Gibbons | Canada | D | | | | | | | | | | |
| 1966 | 4 | 21 | Brian Morenz | Canada | D | | | | | | | | | | |
| 1967 | 1 | 7 | Bob Tombari | Canada | LW | | | | | | | | | | |
| 1968 | 1 | 9 | John Marks | Canada | RW | 657 | 57 | 163 | 275 | 330 | | | | | |
| 1969 | 1 | 13 | Jean-Pierre Bordeleau | Canada | RW | 519 | 97 | 126 | 223 | 143 | | | | | |
| 1969 | 2 | 24 | Larry Romanchych | Canada | RW | 298 | 68 | 97 | 165 | 102 | | | | | |
| 1969 | 3 | 36 | Milt Black | Canada | RW | | | | | | | | | | |
| 1969 | 4 | 48 | Darryl Maggs | Canada | D | 135 | 14 | 19 | 33 | 54 | | | | | |
| 1969 | 5 | 60 | Mike Baumgartner | United States | D | 17 | 0 | 0 | 0 | 0 | | | | | |
| 1969 | 6 | 71 | Dave Hudson | Canada | C | 409 | 59 | 124 | 183 | 89 | | | | | |
| 1970 | 1 | 14 | Dan Maloney | Canada | LW | 737 | 192 | 259 | 451 | 1489 | | | | | |
| 1970 | 2 | 28 | Michel Archambault | Canada | LW | 3 | 0 | 0 | 0 | 0 | | | | | |
| 1970 | 3 | 42 | Len Frig | Canada | D | 311 | 13 | 51 | 64 | 479 | | | | | |
| 1970 | 4 | 56 | Walt Ledingham | Canada | C | 15 | 0 | 2 | 2 | 4 | | | | | |
| 1970 | 5 | 70 | Gilles Meloche | Canada | G | 788 | 0 | 22 | 22 | 111 | 270 | 351 | 131 | – | 3.64 |
| 1971 | 1 | 12 | Dan Spring | Canada | C | | | | | | | | | | |
| 1971 | 2 | 26 | Dave Kryskow | Canada | LW | 231 | 33 | 56 | 89 | 174 | | | | | |
| 1971 | 3 | 40 | Bob Peppler | Canada | LW | | | | | | | | | | |
| 1971 | 4 | 54 | Clyde Simon | Canada | RW | | | | | | | | | | |
| 1971 | 5 | 68 | Dean Blais | United States | LW | | | | | | | | | | |
| 1971 | 6 | 82 | Jim Johnston | Canada | C | | | | | | | | | | |
| 1972 | 1 | 13 | Phil Russell | Canada | D | 1016 | 99 | 325 | 424 | 2038 | | | | | |
| 1972 | 2 | 29 | Brian Ogilvie | Canada | C | 90 | 15 | 21 | 36 | 29 | | | | | |
| 1972 | 3 | 45 | Mike Veisor | Canada | G | 139 | 0 | 3 | 3 | 2 | 41 | 62 | 26 | – | 4.09 |
| 1972 | 4 | 61 | Tom Peluso | United States | RW | | | | | | | | | | |
| 1972 | 5 | 77 | Rejean Giroux | Canada | RW | | | | | | | | | | |
| 1972 | 6 | 93 | Rob Palmer | United States | F | 16 | 0 | 3 | 3 | 2 | | | | | |
| 1972 | 7 | 109 | Terry Smith | Canada | F | | | | | | | | | | |
| 1972 | 8 | 125 | Billy Reay | Canada | W | | | | | | | | | | |
| 1972 | 9 | 141 | Gary Donaldson | Canada | RW | 1 | 0 | 0 | 0 | 0 | | | | | |
| 1973 | 1 | 13 | Darcy Rota | Canada | LW | 794 | 256 | 239 | 495 | 973 | | | | | |
| 1973 | 2 | 29 | Reg Thomas | Canada | C | 39 | 9 | 7 | 16 | 6 | | | | | |
| 1973 | 3 | 45 | Randy Holt | Canada | D | 395 | 4 | 37 | 41 | 1438 | | | | | |
| 1973 | 4 | 61 | Dave Elliott | Canada | C | | | | | | | | | | |
| 1973 | 5 | 77 | Dan Hinton | Canada | F | 14 | 0 | 0 | 0 | 16 | | | | | |
| 1973 | 6 | 93 | Gary Doerksen | Canada | LW | | | | | | | | | | |
| 1973 | 7 | 109 | Wayne Dye | Canada | LW | | | | | | | | | | |
| 1973 | 8 | 125 | Jim Koleff | Canada | F | | | | | | | | | | |
| 1973 | 9 | 140 | Jack Johnson | United States | D | | | | | | | | | | |
| 1973 | 9 | 141 | Steve Alley | United States | LW | 15 | 3 | 3 | 6 | 11 | | | | | |
| 1973 | 10 | 156 | Rick Clubbe | Canada | C | | | | | | | | | | |
| 1973 | 11 | 165 | Gene Strate | Canada | D | | | | | | | | | | |
| 1974 | 1 | 16 | Grant Mulvey | Canada | RW | 586 | 149 | 135 | 284 | 816 | | | | | |
| 1974 | 2 | 34 | Alain Daigle | Canada | RW | 389 | 56 | 50 | 106 | 122 | | | | | |
| 1974 | 3 | 52 | Bob Murray | Canada | D | 1008 | 132 | 382 | 514 | 873 | | | | | |
| 1974 | 4 | 70 | Terry Ruskowski | Canada | C | 630 | 113 | 313 | 426 | 1354 | | | | | |
| 1974 | 5 | 88 | Dave Logan | Canada | D | 218 | 5 | 29 | 34 | 470 | | | | | |
| 1974 | 6 | 106 | Bob Volpe | Canada | G | | | | | | | | | | |
| 1974 | 7 | 124 | Eddie Mio | Canada | G | 192 | 0 | 11 | 11 | 47 | 64 | 73 | 30 | – | 4.06 |
| 1974 | 8 | 141 | Mike St. Cyr | Canada | D | | | | | | | | | | |
| 1974 | 9 | 158 | Steve Colp | Canada | C | | | | | | | | | | |
| 1974 | 10 | 173 | Rick Fraser | Canada | D | | | | | | | | | | |
| 1974 | 11 | 188 | Jean Bernier | Canada | D | | | | | | | | | | |
| 1974 | 12 | 200 | Dwane Byers | Canada | D | | | | | | | | | | |
| 1974 | 13 | 210 | Glen Ing | Canada | RW | | | | | | | | | | |
| 1975 | 1 | 7 | Greg Vaydik | Canada | C | 5 | 0 | 0 | 0 | 0 | | | | | |
| 1975 | 2 | 25 | Danny Arndt | Canada | LW | | | | | | | | | | |
| 1975 | 3 | 43 | Mike O'Connell | United States | D | 860 | 105 | 334 | 439 | 605 | | | | | |
| 1975 | 4 | 61 | Pierre Giroux | Canada | C | 6 | 1 | 0 | 1 | 17 | | | | | |
| 1975 | 5 | 76 | Bob Hoffmeyer | Canada | D | 198 | 14 | 52 | 66 | 325 | | | | | |
| 1975 | 6 | 97 | Tom Ulseth | United States | RW | | | | | | | | | | |
| 1975 | 7 | 115 | Ted Bulley | Canada | LW | 414 | 101 | 113 | 214 | 704 | | | | | |
| 1975 | 8 | 133 | Paul Jensen | United States | D | | | | | | | | | | |
| 1976 | 1 | 9 | Real Cloutier | Canada | RW | 317 | 146 | 198 | 344 | 119 | | | | | |
| 1976 | 2 | 27 | Jeff McDill | Canada | RW | 1 | 0 | 0 | 0 | 0 | | | | | |
| 1976 | 3 | 45 | Thomas Gradin | Sweden | C | 677 | 209 | 384 | 593 | 298 | | | | | |
| 1976 | 4 | 64 | Dave Debol | United States | C | 92 | 26 | 26 | 52 | 4 | | | | | |
| 1976 | 5 | 81 | Terry McDonald | Canada | C | | | | | | | | | | |
| 1976 | 6 | 99 | John Peterson | Canada | G | | | | | | | | | | |
| 1976 | 7 | 115 | John Rothstein | Canada | RW | | | | | | | | | | |
| 1977 | 1 | 6 | Doug Wilson | Canada | D | 1024 | 237 | 590 | 827 | 830 | | | | | |
| 1977 | 2 | 19 | Jean Savard | Canada | C | 43 | 7 | 12 | 19 | 29 | | | | | |
| 1977 | 4 | 60 | Randy Ireland | Canada | G | 2 | 0 | 0 | 0 | 0 | 0 | 0 | 0 | – | 6.00 |
| 1977 | 5 | 78 | Gary Platt | Canada | D | | | | | | | | | | |
| 1977 | 6 | 96 | Jack O'Callahan | United States | D | 389 | 27 | 104 | 131 | 541 | | | | | |
| 1977 | 7 | 114 | Floyd Lahache | Canada | D | | | | | | | | | | |
| 1977 | 8 | 129 | Jeff Geiger | Canada | D | | | | | | | | | | |
| 1977 | 9 | 144 | Stephen Ough | Canada | D | | | | | | | | | | |
| 1978 | 1 | 10 | Tim Higgins | Canada | RW | 706 | 154 | 198 | 352 | 719 | | | | | |
| 1978 | 2 | 29 | Doug Lecuyer | Canada | LW | 126 | 11 | 31 | 42 | 178 | | | | | |
| 1978 | 3 | 46 | Rick Paterson | Canada | C | 430 | 50 | 43 | 93 | 136 | | | | | |
| 1978 | 4 | 63 | Brian Young | Canada | D | 8 | 0 | 2 | 2 | 6 | | | | | |
| 1978 | 5 | 79 | Mark Murphy | Canada | LW | | | | | | | | | | |
| 1978 | 6 | 96 | Dave Feamster | United States | D | 169 | 13 | 24 | 37 | 154 | | | | | |
| 1978 | 7 | 113 | Dave Mancuso | Canada | D | | | | | | | | | | |
| 1978 | 8 | 130 | Sandy Ross | Canada | D | | | | | | | | | | |
| 1978 | 9 | 147 | Mark Locken | Canada | G | | | | | | | | | | |
| 1978 | 10 | 164 | Glenn Van | United States | D | | | | | | | | | | |
| 1978 | 11 | 179 | Darryl Sutter | Canada | LW | 406 | 161 | 118 | 279 | 288 | | | | | |
| 1979 | 1 | 7 | Keith Brown | Canada | D | 876 | 68 | 274 | 342 | 916 | | | | | |
| 1979 | 2 | 28 | Tim Trimper | Canada | LW | 190 | 30 | 36 | 66 | 153 | | | | | |
| 1979 | 3 | 49 | Bill Gardner | Canada | C | 380 | 73 | 115 | 188 | 68 | | | | | |
| 1979 | 4 | 70 | Lou Begin | Canada | LW | | | | | | | | | | |
| 1979 | 5 | 91 | Lowell Loveday | Canada | D | | | | | | | | | | |
| 1979 | 6 | 112 | Doug Crossman | Canada | D | 914 | 105 | 359 | 464 | 534 | | | | | |
| 1980 | 1 | 3 | Denis Savard | Canada | C | 1196 | 473 | 865 | 1338 | 1336 | | | | | |
| 1980 | 1 | 15 | Jerome Dupont | Canada | D | 214 | 7 | 29 | 36 | 468 | | | | | |
| 1980 | 2 | 28 | Steve Ludzik | Canada | F | 424 | 46 | 93 | 139 | 333 | | | | | |
| 1980 | 2 | 30 | Ken Solheim | Canada | F | 135 | 19 | 20 | 39 | 34 | | | | | |
| 1980 | 2 | 36 | Len Dawes | Canada | D | | | | | | | | | | |
| 1980 | 3 | 57 | Troy Murray | Canada | C | 915 | 230 | 354 | 584 | 875 | | | | | |
| 1980 | 3 | 58 | Marcel Frere | Canada | LW | | | | | | | | | | |
| 1980 | 4 | 67 | Carey Wilson | Canada | C | 552 | 169 | 258 | 427 | 314 | | | | | |
| 1980 | 4 | 78 | Brian Shaw | Canada | LW | | | | | | | | | | |
| 1980 | 5 | 99 | Kevin Ginnell | Canada | C | | | | | | | | | | |
| 1980 | 6 | 120 | Steve Larmer | Canada | RW | 1006 | 441 | 571 | 1012 | 532 | | | | | |
| 1980 | 7 | 41 | Sean Simpson | Canada | C | | | | | | | | | | |
| 1980 | 8 | 162 | Jim Ralph | Canada | G | | | | | | | | | | |
| 1980 | 9 | 183 | Don Dietrich | Canada | D | 28 | 0 | 7 | 7 | 10 | | | | | |
| 1980 | 10 | 204 | Dan Frawley | Canada | RW | 273 | 37 | 40 | 77 | 674 | | | | | |
| 1981 | 1 | 12 | Tony Tanti | Canada | RW | 697 | 287 | 273 | 560 | 661 | | | | | |
| 1981 | 2 | 25 | Kevin Griffin | Canada | LW | | | | | | | | | | |
| 1981 | 3 | 54 | Darrell Anholt | Canada | D | 1 | 0 | 0 | 0 | 0 | | | | | |
| 1981 | 4 | 75 | Perry Pelensky | Canada | RW | 4 | 0 | 0 | 0 | 5 | | | | | |
| 1981 | 5 | 96 | Doug Chessell | Canada | G | | | | | | | | | | |
| 1981 | 6 | 117 | Bill Schafhauser | United States | D | | | | | | | | | | |
| 1981 | 7 | 138 | Marc Centrone | Canada | C | | | | | | | | | | |
| 1981 | 8 | 159 | Johan Mellstrom | Canada | LW | | | | | | | | | | |
| 1981 | 9 | 180 | John Benns | Canada | LW | | | | | | | | | | |
| 1981 | 10 | 201 | Sylvain Roy | Canada | D | | | | | | | | | | |
| 1982 | 1 | 7 | Ken Yaremchuk | Canada | C | 235 | 36 | 56 | 92 | 106 | | | | | |
| 1982 | 2 | 28 | Rene Badeau | Canada | D | | | | | | | | | | |
| 1982 | 3 | 49 | Tom McMurchy | Canada | RW | 55 | 8 | 4 | 12 | 65 | | | | | |
| 1982 | 4 | 70 | Bill Watson | Canada | RW | 115 | 23 | 36 | 59 | 12 | | | | | |
| 1982 | 5 | 91 | Brad Beck | Canada | D | | | | | | | | | | |
| 1982 | 6 | 112 | Mark Hatcher | United States | D | | | | | | | | | | |
| 1982 | 7 | 133 | Jay Ness | United States | D | | | | | | | | | | |
| 1982 | 8 | 154 | Jeff Smith | Canada | LW | | | | | | | | | | |
| 1982 | 9 | 175 | Phil Patterson | Canada | RW | | | | | | | | | | |
| 1982 | 10 | 196 | Jim Camazzola | Canada | LW | 3 | 0 | 0 | 0 | 0 | | | | | |
| 1982 | 11 | 217 | Mike James | Canada | D | | | | | | | | | | |
| 1982 | 12 | 238 | Bob Andrea | Canada | D | | | | | | | | | | |
| 1983 | 1 | 18 | Bruce Cassidy | Canada | D | 36 | 4 | 13 | 17 | 10 | | | | | |
| 1983 | 2 | 39 | Wayne Presley | United States | RW | 684 | 155 | 147 | 302 | 953 | | | | | |
| 1983 | 3 | 59 | Marc Bergevin | Canada | D | 1191 | 36 | 145 | 181 | 1090 | | | | | |
| 1983 | 4 | 79 | Tarek Howard | Canada | D | | | | | | | | | | |
| 1983 | 5 | 99 | Kevin Robinson | Canada | LW | | | | | | | | | | |
| 1983 | 6 | 115 | Jari Torkki | Finland | LW | 4 | 1 | 0 | 1 | 0 | | | | | |
| 1983 | 6 | 119 | Mark LaVarre | United States | RW | 78 | 9 | 16 | 25 | 58 | | | | | |
| 1983 | 7 | 139 | Scott Birnie | Canada | RW | | | | | | | | | | |
| 1983 | 8 | 159 | Kent Paynter | Canada | D | 37 | 1 | 3 | 4 | 69 | | | | | |
| 1983 | 9 | 179 | Brian Noonan | United States | C | 629 | 116 | 159 | 275 | 518 | | | | | |
| 1983 | 10 | 199 | Dominik Hasek | Czech Republic | G | 735 | 0 | 19 | 19 | 170 | 389 | 223 | 82 | 32 | 2.20 |
| 1983 | 11 | 219 | Steve Pepin | Canada | C | | | | | | | | | | |
| 1984 | 1 | 3 | Ed Olczyk | United States | RW | 1031 | 342 | 452 | 794 | 874 | | | | | |
| 1984 | 3 | 45 | Trent Yawney | Canada | D | 593 | 27 | 102 | 129 | 783 | | | | | |
| 1984 | 4 | 66 | Tom Eriksson | Sweden | LW | | | | | | | | | | |
| 1984 | 5 | 90 | Timo Lehkonen | Finland | G | | | | | | | | | | |
| 1984 | 5 | 101 | Darin Sceviour | Canada | RW | 1 | 0 | 0 | 0 | 0 | | | | | |
| 1984 | 6 | 111 | Chris Clifford | Canada | G | 2 | 0 | 0 | 0 | 0 | 0 | 0 | 0 | – | 0.00 |
| 1984 | 7 | 132 | Mike Stapleton | Canada | C | 697 | 71 | 111 | 182 | 342 | | | | | |
| 1984 | 8 | 153 | Glenn Greenough | Canada | RW | | | | | | | | | | |
| 1984 | 9 | 174 | Ralph DiFiori | Canada | D | | | | | | | | | | |
| 1984 | 10 | 194 | Joakim Persson | Sweden | D | | | | | | | | | | |
| 1984 | 11 | 215 | Bill Brown | United States | C | | | | | | | | | | |
| 1984 | 11 | 224 | David Mackey | Canada | LW | 126 | 8 | 12 | 20 | 305 | | | | | |
| 1984 | 12 | 235 | Dan Williams | United States | D | | | | | | | | | | |
| 1985 | 1 | 11 | Dave Manson | Canada | D | 1103 | 102 | 288 | 390 | 2792 | | | | | |
| 1985 | 3 | 53 | Andy Helmuth | Canada | G | | | | | | | | | | |
| 1985 | 4 | 74 | Dan Vincelette | Canada | LW | 193 | 20 | 22 | 42 | 351 | | | | | |
| 1985 | 5 | 87 | Rick Herbert | Canada | D | | | | | | | | | | |
| 1985 | 5 | 95 | Brad Belland | Canada | C | | | | | | | | | | |
| 1985 | 6 | 116 | Jonas Heed | Sweden | D | | | | | | | | | | |
| 1985 | 7 | 137 | Victor Posa | United States | D | | | | | | | | | | |
| 1985 | 8 | 158 | John Reid | United States | D | | | | | | | | | | |
| 1985 | 9 | 179 | Richard Laplante | Canada | C | | | | | | | | | | |
| 1985 | 10 | 200 | Brad Hamilton | Canada | D | | | | | | | | | | |
| 1985 | 11 | 221 | Ian Pound | Canada | D | | | | | | | | | | |
| 1985 | 12 | 242 | Richard Braccia | United States | LW | | | | | | | | | | |
| 1986 | 1 | 14 | Everett Sanipass | Canada | LW | 164 | 25 | 34 | 59 | 358 | | | | | |
| 1986 | 2 | 35 | Mark Kurzawski | United States | D | | | | | | | | | | |
| 1986 | 4 | 77 | Frantisek Kucera | Czechoslovakia | D | 465 | 24 | 95 | 119 | 251 | | | | | |
| 1986 | 5 | 98 | Lonnie Loach | Canada | LW | 56 | 10 | 13 | 23 | 29 | | | | | |
| 1986 | 6 | 119 | Mario Doyon | Canada | D | 28 | 3 | 4 | 7 | 16 | | | | | |
| 1986 | 7 | 140 | Mike Hudson | Canada | C | 416 | 49 | 87 | 136 | 414 | | | | | |
| 1986 | 8 | 161 | Marty Nanne | United States | RW | | | | | | | | | | |
| 1986 | 9 | 182 | Geoff Benic | Canada | LW | | | | | | | | | | |
| 1986 | 10 | 203 | Glenn Lowes | Canada | LW | | | | | | | | | | |
| 1986 | 11 | 224 | Chris Thayer | United States | C | | | | | | | | | | |
| 1986 | 12 | 245 | Sean Williams | Canada | C | 2 | 0 | 0 | 0 | 4 | | | | | |
| 1986 | S | 17 | Dave Randall | Canada | D | | | | | | | | | | |
| 1987 | 1 | 8 | Jimmy Waite | Canada | G | 106 | 0 | 1 | 1 | 10 | 28 | 41 | 12 | – | 3.42 |
| 1987 | 2 | 29 | Ryan McGill | Canada | D | 151 | 4 | 15 | 19 | 391 | | | | | |
| 1987 | 3 | 50 | Cam Russell | Canada | D | 396 | 9 | 21 | 30 | 872 | | | | | |
| 1987 | 3 | 60 | Mike Dagenais | Canada | D | | | | | | | | | | |
| 1987 | 5 | 92 | Ulf Sandstrom | Sweden | RW | | | | | | | | | | |
| 1987 | 6 | 113 | Mike McCormick | United States | RW | | | | | | | | | | |
| 1987 | 7 | 134 | Stephen Tepper | United States | RW | 1 | 0 | 0 | 0 | 0 | | | | | |
| 1987 | 8 | 155 | John Reilly | United States | LW | | | | | | | | | | |
| 1987 | 9 | 176 | Lance Werness | United States | RW | | | | | | | | | | |
| 1987 | 10 | 197 | Dale Marquette | Canada | LW | | | | | | | | | | |
| 1987 | 11 | 218 | Bill LaCouture | United States | RW | | | | | | | | | | |
| 1987 | 12 | 239 | Mike Lappin | United States | C | | | | | | | | | | |
| 1988 | 1 | 8 | Jeremy Roenick | United States | C | 1363 | 513 | 703 | 1216 | 1463 | | | | | |
| 1988 | 3 | 50 | Trevor Dam | Canada | RW | | | | | | | | | | |
| 1988 | 4 | 71 | Stefan Elvenes | Sweden | RW | | | | | | | | | | |
| 1988 | 5 | 92 | Joe Cleary | United States | D | | | | | | | | | | |
| 1988 | 6 | 113 | Justin Lafayette | Canada | C | | | | | | | | | | |
| 1988 | 7 | 134 | Craig Woodcroft | United States | C | | | | | | | | | | |
| 1988 | 8 | 155 | Jon Pojar | United States | LW | | | | | | | | | | |
| 1988 | 9 | 176 | Matt Hentges | United States | D | | | | | | | | | | |
| 1988 | 10 | 197 | Daniel Maurice | Canada | C | | | | | | | | | | |
| 1988 | 11 | 218 | Dirk Tenzer | United States | D | | | | | | | | | | |
| 1988 | 12 | 239 | Andreas Lupzig | West Germany | C | | | | | | | | | | |
| 1988 | S | 13 | Todd Wolf | United States | D | | | | | | | | | | |
| 1989 | 1 | 6 | Adam Bennett | Canada | D | 69 | 3 | 8 | 11 | 69 | | | | | |
| 1989 | 2 | 27 | Mike Speer | Canada | D | | | | | | | | | | |
| 1989 | 3 | 48 | Bob Kellogg | United States | D | | | | | | | | | | |
| 1989 | 6 | 111 | Tommi Pullola | Finland | LW | | | | | | | | | | |
| 1989 | 7 | 132 | Tracy Egeland | Canada | RW | | | | | | | | | | |
| 1989 | 8 | 153 | Milan Tichy | Czechoslovakia | D | 23 | 0 | 5 | 5 | 40 | | | | | |
| 1989 | 9 | 174 | Jason Greyerbiehl | Canada | LW | | | | | | | | | | |
| 1989 | 10 | 195 | Matt Saunders | Canada | LW | | | | | | | | | | |
| 1989 | 11 | 216 | Mike Kozak | Canada | RW | | | | | | | | | | |
| 1989 | 12 | 237 | Mike Doneghey | United States | G | | | | | | | | | | |
| 1989 | S | 11 | Alex Roberts | United States | D | | | | | | | | | | |
| 1990 | 1 | 16 | Karl Dykhuis | Canada | D | 644 | 42 | 91 | 133 | 495 | | | | | |
| 1990 | 2 | 37 | Ivan Droppa | Czechoslovakia | D | 19 | 0 | 1 | 1 | 14 | | | | | |
| 1990 | 4 | 79 | Chris Tucker | United States | C | | | | | | | | | | |
| 1990 | 6 | 121 | Brent Stickney | United States | C | | | | | | | | | | |
| 1990 | 6 | 124 | Derek Edgerly | United States | C | | | | | | | | | | |
| 1990 | 8 | 163 | Hugo Belanger | Canada | LW | | | | | | | | | | |
| 1990 | 9 | 184 | Owen Lessard | Canada | LW | | | | | | | | | | |
| 1990 | 10 | 205 | Erik Peterson | United States | C | | | | | | | | | | |
| 1990 | 11 | 226 | Steve Dubinsky | Canada | C | 375 | 25 | 45 | 70 | 164 | | | | | |
| 1990 | 12 | 247 | Dino Grossi | Canada | F | | | | | | | | | | |
| 1990 | S | 21 | Claude Maillet | Canada | D | | | | | | | | | | |
| 1991 | 1 | 22 | Dean McAmmond | Canada | LW | 996 | 186 | 262 | 448 | 490 | | | | | |
| 1991 | 2 | 39 | Mike Pomichter | United States | LW | | | | | | | | | | |
| 1991 | 2 | 44 | Jamie Matthews | Canada | C | | | | | | | | | | |
| 1991 | 3 | 66 | Bobby House | Canada | RW | | | | | | | | | | |
| 1991 | 4 | 71 | Igor Kravchuk | Soviet Union | D | 699 | 64 | 210 | 274 | 251 | | | | | |
| 1991 | 4 | 88 | Zac Boyer | Canada | RW | 3 | 0 | 0 | 0 | 0 | | | | | |
| 1991 | 5 | 110 | Maco Balkovec | Canada | D | | | | | | | | | | |
| 1991 | 6 | 112 | Kevin St. Jacques | Canada | C | | | | | | | | | | |
| 1991 | 6 | 132 | Jacques Auger | Canada | D | | | | | | | | | | |
| 1991 | 7 | 154 | Scott Kirton | Canada | RW | | | | | | | | | | |
| 1991 | 8 | 176 | Roch Belley | Canada | G | | | | | | | | | | |
| 1991 | 9 | 198 | Scott MacDonald | United States | D | | | | | | | | | | |
| 1991 | 10 | 220 | Alexander Andrijevski | Soviet Union | RW | 1 | 0 | 0 | 0 | 0 | | | | | |
| 1991 | 11 | 242 | Mike Larkin | United States | D | | | | | | | | | | |
| 1991 | 12 | 264 | Scott Dean | United States | D | | | | | | | | | | |
| 1991 | S | 28 | Dan Gravelle | Canada | LW | | | | | | | | | | |
| 1992 | 1 | 12 | Sergei Krivokrasov | Russia | RW | 450 | 86 | 109 | 195 | 288 | | | | | |
| 1992 | 2 | 36 | Jeff Shantz | Canada | C | 642 | 72 | 139 | 211 | 341 | | | | | |
| 1992 | 2 | 41 | Sergei Klimovich | Russia | C | 1 | 0 | 0 | 0 | 2 | | | | | |
| 1992 | 4 | 89 | Andy MacIntyre | Canada | LW | | | | | | | | | | |
| 1992 | 5 | 113 | Tim Hogan | Canada | D | | | | | | | | | | |
| 1992 | 6 | 137 | Gerry Skrypec | Canada | D | | | | | | | | | | |
| 1992 | 7 | 161 | Mike Prokopec | Canada | RW | 15 | 0 | 0 | 0 | 11 | | | | | |
| 1992 | 8 | 185 | Layne Roland | Canada | RW | | | | | | | | | | |
| 1992 | 9 | 209 | David Hymovitz | United States | LW | | | | | | | | | | |
| 1992 | 10 | 233 | Richard Raymond | Canada | D | | | | | | | | | | |
| 1993 | 1 | 24 | Eric Lecompte | Canada | LW | | | | | | | | | | |
| 1993 | 2 | 50 | Eric Manlow | Canada | C | 37 | 2 | 4 | 6 | 8 | | | | | |
| 1993 | 3 | 54 | Bogdan Savenko | Russia | RW | | | | | | | | | | |
| 1993 | 3 | 76 | Ryan Huska | Canada | C | 1 | 0 | 0 | 0 | 0 | | | | | |
| 1993 | 4 | 90 | Eric Daze | Canada | LW | 601 | 226 | 172 | 398 | 176 | | | | | |
| 1993 | 4 | 102 | Patrick Pysz | Poland | RW | | | | | | | | | | |
| 1993 | 5 | 128 | Jonni Vauhkonen | Finland | RW | | | | | | | | | | |
| 1993 | 7 | 180 | Tom White | United States | LW | | | | | | | | | | |
| 1993 | 8 | 206 | Sergei Petrov | Russia | RW | | | | | | | | | | |
| 1993 | 9 | 232 | Mike Rusk | Canada | D | | | | | | | | | | |
| 1993 | 10 | 258 | Mike McGhan | Canada | LW | | | | | | | | | | |
| 1993 | 11 | 284 | Tom Noble | United States | G | | | | | | | | | | |
| 1994 | 1 | 14 | Ethan Moreau | Canada | LW | 928 | 147 | 140 | 287 | 1110 | | | | | |
| 1994 | 2 | 40 | Jean-Yves Leroux | Canada | LW | 220 | 16 | 22 | 38 | 146 | | | | | |
| 1994 | 4 | 85 | Steve McLaren | Canada | LW | 6 | 0 | 0 | 0 | 25 | | | | | |
| 1994 | 5 | 118 | Marc Dupuis | Canada | D | | | | | | | | | | |
| 1994 | 6 | 144 | Jim Ensom | Canada | LW | | | | | | | | | | |
| 1994 | 7 | 170 | Tyler Prosofsky | Canada | RW | | | | | | | | | | |
| 1994 | 8 | 196 | Mike Josephson | Canada | LW | | | | | | | | | | |
| 1994 | 9 | 222 | Lubomir Jandera | Czech Republic | D | | | | | | | | | | |
| 1994 | 10 | 248 | Lars Weibel | Switzerland | G | | | | | | | | | | |
| 1994 | 11 | 263 | Rob Mara | United States | F | | | | | | | | | | |
| 1995 | 1 | 19 | Dmitri Nabokov | Russia | RW | 55 | 11 | 13 | 24 | 28 | | | | | |
| 1995 | 2 | 45 | Christian Laflamme | Canada | D | 324 | 2 | 45 | 47 | 282 | | | | | |
| 1995 | 3 | 71 | Kevin McKay | Canada | D | | | | | | | | | | |
| 1995 | 4 | 82 | Chris Van Dyk | Canada | D | | | | | | | | | | |
| 1995 | 4 | 97 | Pavel Kriz | Czech Republic | D | | | | | | | | | | |
| 1995 | 6 | 146 | Marc Magliarditi | United States | G | | | | | | | | | | |
| 1995 | 6 | 149 | Marty Wilford | Canada | D | | | | | | | | | | |
| 1995 | 7 | 175 | Steve Tardif | Canada | C | | | | | | | | | | |
| 1995 | 8 | 201 | Casey Hankinson | United States | RW | 18 | 0 | 1 | 1 | 13 | | | | | |
| 1995 | 9 | 227 | Michael Pittman | Canada | RW | | | | | | | | | | |
| 1996 | 2 | 31 | Remi Royer | Canada | D | 18 | 0 | 0 | 0 | 67 | | | | | |
| 1996 | 2 | 42 | Jeff Paul | Canada | D | 2 | 0 | 0 | 0 | 7 | | | | | |
| 1996 | 2 | 46 | Geoff Peters | Canada | C | | | | | | | | | | |
| 1996 | 5 | 130 | Andy Johnson | Canada | D | | | | | | | | | | |
| 1996 | 7 | 184 | Mike Vellinga | Canada | D | | | | | | | | | | |
| 1996 | 8 | 210 | Chris Twerdun | Canada | D | | | | | | | | | | |
| 1996 | 9 | 236 | Andrei Kozyrev | Russia | D | | | | | | | | | | |
| 1997 | 1 | 13 | Daniel Cleary | Canada | LW | 938 | 165 | 222 | 387 | 492 | | | | | |
| 1997 | 1 | 16 | Ty Jones | Canada | LW | 14 | 0 | 0 | 0 | 19 | | | | | |
| 1997 | 2 | 39 | Jeremy Reich | Canada | LW | 99 | 2 | 4 | 6 | 161 | | | | | |
| 1997 | 3 | 67 | Michael Souza | Canada | LW | | | | | | | | | | |
| 1997 | 5 | 110 | Ben Simon | United States | C | 81 | 3 | 1 | 4 | 47 | | | | | |
| 1997 | 5 | 120 | Pete Gardiner | Canada | RW | | | | | | | | | | |
| 1997 | 5 | 130 | Kyle Calder | Canada | LW | 590 | 114 | 180 | 294 | 309 | | | | | |
| 1997 | 6 | 147 | Heath Gordon | United States | LW | | | | | | | | | | |
| 1997 | 7 | 174 | Jared Smith | Canada | D | | | | | | | | | | |
| 1997 | 8 | 204 | Sergei Shikhanov | Russia | RW | | | | | | | | | | |
| 1997 | 9 | 230 | Chris Feil | United States | D | | | | | | | | | | |
| 1998 | 1 | 8 | Mark Bell | Canada | LW | 450 | 87 | 95 | 182 | 602 | | | | | |
| 1998 | 4 | 94 | Matthias Trattnig | Austria | C | | | | | | | | | | |
| 1998 | 6 | 156 | Kent Huskins | Canada | D | 318 | 13 | 55 | 68 | 173 | | | | | |
| 1998 | 6 | 158 | Jari Viuhkola | Finland | C | | | | | | | | | | |
| 1998 | 6 | 166 | Jonathan Pelletier | Canada | G | | | | | | | | | | |
| 1998 | 7 | 183 | Tyler Arnason | United States | C | 487 | 88 | 157 | 245 | 140 | | | | | |
| 1998 | 8 | 210 | Sean Griffin | Canada | D | | | | | | | | | | |
| 1998 | 9 | 238 | Alexandre Couture | Canada | LW | | | | | | | | | | |
| 1998 | 9 | 240 | Andrei Yershov | Russia | D | | | | | | | | | | |
| 1999 | 1 | 23 | Steve McCarthy | Canada | LW | 302 | 17 | 38 | 55 | 168 | | | | | |
| 1999 | 2 | 46 | Dmitri Levinsky | Kazakhstan | LW | | | | | | | | | | |
| 1999 | 2 | 63 | Stepan Mokhov | Kazakhstan | D | | | | | | | | | | |
| 1999 | 5 | 134 | Michael Jacobsen | Canada | D | | | | | | | | | | |
| 1999 | 6 | 165 | Michael Leighton | Canada | G | 110 | 0 | 4 | 4 | 6 | 37 | 43 | 10 | 4 | 2.98 |
| 1999 | 7 | 194 | Mattias Wennerberg | Sweden | C | | | | | | | | | | |
| 1999 | 7 | 195 | Yorick Treille | France | RW | | | | | | | | | | |
| 1999 | 8 | 223 | Andrew Carver | Canada | D | | | | | | | | | | |
| 2000 | 1 | 10 | Mikhail Yakubov | Russia | C | 53 | 2 | 10 | 12 | 20 | | | | | |
| 2000 | 1 | 11 | Pavel Vorobiev | Kazakhstan | RW | 57 | 10 | 15 | 25 | 38 | | | | | |
| 2000 | 2 | 49 | Jonas Nordquist | Sweden | C | 3 | 0 | 2 | 2 | 2 | | | | | |
| 2000 | 3 | 74 | Igor Radulov | Russia | LW | 43 | 9 | 7 | 16 | 22 | | | | | |
| 2000 | 4 | 106 | Scotty Balan | Canada | D | | | | | | | | | | |
| 2000 | 4 | 117 | Olli Malmivaara | Finland | D | 2 | 0 | 0 | 0 | 0 | | | | | |
| 2000 | 5 | 151 | Alexander Barkunov | Russia | D | | | | | | | | | | |
| 2000 | 6 | 177 | Mike Ayers | United States | G | | | | | | | | | | |
| 2000 | 6 | 193 | Joey Martin | United States | D | | | | | | | | | | |
| 2000 | 7 | 207 | Cliff Loya | United States | D | | | | | | | | | | |
| 2000 | 7 | 225 | Vladislav Luchkin | Russia | C | | | | | | | | | | |
| 2000 | 8 | 240 | Adam Berkhoel | United States | G | 9 | 0 | 0 | 0 | 0 | 2 | 4 | – | 1 | 3.81 |
| 2000 | 9 | 262 | Peter Flache | Canada | C | | | | | | | | | | |
| 2000 | 9 | 271 | Reto Von Arx | Switzerland | LW | 19 | 3 | 1 | 4 | 4 | | | | | |
| 2000 | 9 | 291 | Arne Ramholt | Switzerland | D | | | | | | | | | | |
| 2001 | 1 | 9 | Tuomo Ruutu | Finland | LW | 735 | 148 | 198 | 346 | 596 | | | | | |
| 2001 | 1 | 29 | Adam Munro | Canada | G | 17 | 0 | 1 | 1 | 2 | 4 | 10 | 1 | 2 | 3.30 |
| 2001 | 2 | 59 | Matt Keith | Canada | C | 27 | 2 | 3 | 5 | 14 | | | | | |
| 2001 | 3 | 73 | Craig Anderson | United States | G | 709 | 0 | 20 | 20 | 56 | 319 | 275 | 2 | 71 | 2.86 |
| 2001 | 4 | 104 | Brent MacLellan | Canada | D | | | | | | | | | | |
| 2001 | 4 | 115 | Vladimir Gusev | Russia | D | | | | | | | | | | |
| 2001 | 4 | 119 | Alexei Zotkin | Russia | LW | | | | | | | | | | |
| 2001 | 5 | 142 | Tommi Jaminki | Finland | RW | | | | | | | | | | |
| 2001 | 6 | 174 | Alexander Golovin | Russia | LW | | | | | | | | | | |
| 2001 | 6 | 186 | Petr Puncochar | Czech Republic | D | | | | | | | | | | |
| 2001 | 7 | 205 | Teemu Jaaskelainen | Finland | D | | | | | | | | | | |
| 2001 | 7 | 216 | Oleg Minakov | Russia | C | | | | | | | | | | |
| 2001 | 9 | 268 | Jeff Miles | Canada | RW | | | | | | | | | | |
| 2002 | 1 | 21 | Anton Babchuk | Ukraine | D | 289 | 36 | 71 | 107 | 108 | | | | | |
| 2002 | 2 | 54 | Duncan Keith | Canada | D | 1256 | 106 | 540 | 646 | 675 | | | | | |
| 2002 | 3 | 93 | Alexander Kozhevnikov | Canada | F | | | | | | | | | | |
| 2002 | 4 | 128 | Matt Ellison | Canada | C | 43 | 3 | 11 | 14 | 19 | | | | | |
| 2002 | 5 | 156 | James Wisniewski | United States | D | 552 | 53 | 221 | 274 | 459 | | | | | |
| 2002 | 6 | 188 | Kevin Kantee | Finland | D | | | | | | | | | | |
| 2002 | 7 | 219 | Tyson Kellerman | Canada | G | | | | | | | | | | |
| 2002 | 8 | 251 | Jason Kostadine | United States | RW | | | | | | | | | | |
| 2002 | 9 | 282 | Adam Burish | United States | C | 378 | 27 | 33 | 60 | 554 | | | | | |
| 2003 | 1 | 14 | Brent Seabrook | Canada | D | 1114 | 103 | 361 | 464 | 661 | | | | | |
| 2003 | 2 | 52 | Corey Crawford | Canada | G | 488 | 0 | 9 | 9 | 18 | 260 | 162 | – | 53 | 2.45 |
| 2003 | 2 | 59 | Michal Barinka | Czech Republic | D | 34 | 0 | 2 | 2 | 26 | | | | | |
| 2003 | 5 | 151 | Lasse Kukkonen | Finland | D | 159 | 6 | 16 | 22 | 90 | | | | | |
| 2003 | 5 | 156 | Alexei Ivanov | Russia | LW | | | | | | | | | | |
| 2003 | 6 | 181 | Johan Andersson | Sweden | C | | | | | | | | | | |
| 2003 | 7 | 211 | Mike Brodeur | Canada | G | 7 | 0 | 0 | 0 | 0 | 3 | 1 | – | 0 | 2.17 |
| 2003 | 8 | 245 | Dustin Byfuglien | United States | D | 869 | 177 | 348 | 525 | 1094 | | | | | |
| 2003 | 9 | 275 | Michael Grenzy | United States | D | | | | | | | | | | |
| 2003 | 9 | 282 | Chris Porter | Canada | LW | 234 | 15 | 19 | 34 | 39 | | | | | |
| 2004 | 1 | 3 | Cam Barker | Canada | D | 310 | 21 | 75 | 96 | 290 | | | | | |
| 2004 | 2 | 32 | Dave Bolland | Canada | C | 433 | 85 | 123 | 208 | 299 | | | | | |
| 2004 | 2 | 41 | Bryan Bickell | Canada | LW | 395 | 66 | 70 | 136 | 192 | | | | | |
| 2004 | 2 | 45 | Ryan Garlock | Canada | C | | | | | | | | | | |
| 2004 | 2 | 54 | Jakub Sindel | Czech Republic | C | | | | | | | | | | |
| 2004 | 3 | 68 | Adam Berti | Canada | LW | 2 | 0 | 0 | 0 | 0 | | | | | |
| 2004 | 4 | 120 | Mitch Maunu | Canada | D | | | | | | | | | | |
| 2004 | 4 | 123 | Karel Hromas | Czech Republic | LW | | | | | | | | | | |
| 2004 | 5 | 131 | Trevor Kell | Canada | RW | | | | | | | | | | |
| 2004 | 5 | 140 | Jake Dowell | United States | C | 157 | 11 | 22 | 33 | 133 | | | | | |
| 2004 | 6 | 165 | Scott McCulloch | Canada | LW | | | | | | | | | | |
| 2004 | 7 | 196 | Petri Kontiola | Finland | C | 12 | 0 | 5 | 5 | 6 | | | | | |
| 2004 | 7 | 214 | Troy Brouwer | Canada | LW | 851 | 182 | 181 | 363 | 595 | | | | | |
| 2004 | 7 | 223 | Jared Walker | Canada | LW | | | | | | | | | | |
| 2004 | 8 | 229 | Eric Hunter | Canada | C | | | | | | | | | | |
| 2004 | 8 | 256 | Matthew Ford | United States | RW | | | | | | | | | | |
| 2004 | 9 | 260 | Marko Anttila | Finland | RW | | | | | | | | | | |
| 2005 | 1 | 7 | Jack Skille | United States | RW | 368 | 43 | 41 | 84 | 118 | | | | | |
| 2005 | 2 | 43 | Mike Blunden | Canada | RW | 127 | 7 | 6 | 13 | 145 | | | | | |
| 2005 | 2 | 54 | Dan Bertram | Canada | RW | | | | | | | | | | |
| 2005 | 3 | 68 | Evan Brophey | Canada | RW | 4 | 0 | 0 | 0 | 0 | | | | | |
| 2005 | 4 | 108 | Niklas Hjalmarsson | Sweden | D | 821 | 25 | 147 | 172 | 332 | | | | | |
| 2005 | 4 | 113 | Nathan Davis | United States | C | | | | | | | | | | |
| 2005 | 4 | 117 | Denis Istomin | Russia | C | | | | | | | | | | |
| 2005 | 5 | 134 | Brennan Turner | Russia | D | | | | | | | | | | |
| 2005 | 6 | 167 | Joe Fallon | United States | G | | | | | | | | | | |
| 2005 | 6 | 188 | Joe Charlebois | United States | D | | | | | | | | | | |
| 2005 | 7 | 202 | David Kuchejda | Czech Republic | RW | | | | | | | | | | |
| 2005 | 7 | 203 | Adam Hobson | Canada | C | | | | | | | | | | |
| 2006 | 1 | 3 | Jonathan Toews | Canada | C | 1149 | 383 | 529 | 912 | 645 | | | | | |
| 2006 | 2 | 33 | Igor Makarov | Russia | RW | | | | | | | | | | |
| 2006 | 2 | 61 | Simon Danis-Pepin | Canada | D | | | | | | | | | | |
| 2006 | 3 | 76 | Tony Lagerstrom | Sweden | C | | | | | | | | | | |
| 2006 | 4 | 95 | Ben Shutron | Canada | D | | | | | | | | | | |
| 2006 | 4 | 96 | Joe Palmer | United States | G | | | | | | | | | | |
| 2006 | 6 | 156 | Jan-Mikael Juutilainen | Finland | C | | | | | | | | | | |
| 2006 | 6 | 169 | Chris Auger | Canada | C | | | | | | | | | | |
| 2006 | 7 | 186 | Peter LeBlanc | Canada | C | 1 | 0 | 0 | 0 | 0 | | | | | |
| 2007 | 1 | 1 | Patrick Kane | United States | RW | 1369 | 508 | 892 | 1400 | 470 | | | | | |
| 2007 | 2 | 38 | Bill Sweatt | United States | RW | 3 | 0 | 0 | 0 | 0 | | | | | |
| 2007 | 2 | 56 | Akim Aliu | Nigeria | RW | 7 | 2 | 1 | 3 | 26 | | | | | |
| 2007 | 3 | 69 | Maxime Tanguay | Canada | C | | | | | | | | | | |
| 2007 | 3 | 86 | Josh Unice | United States | G | | | | | | | | | | |
| 2007 | 5 | 126 | Joseph Lavin | United States | D | | | | | | | | | | |
| 2007 | 6 | 156 | Richard Greenop | Canada | RW | | | | | | | | | | |
| 2008 | 1 | 11 | Kyle Beach | Canada | C | | | | | | | | | | |
| 2008 | 3 | 68 | Shawn Lalonde | Canada | D | 1 | 0 | 0 | 0 | 0 | | | | | |
| 2008 | 5 | 132 | Teigan Zahn | Canada | D | | | | | | | | | | |
| 2008 | 6 | 162 | Jonathan Carlsson | Sweden | D | | | | | | | | | | |
| 2008 | 6 | 169 | Ben Smith | United States | RW | 237 | 29 | 25 | 54 | 8 | | | | | |
| 2008 | 6 | 179 | Braden Birch | Canada | D | | | | | | | | | | |
| 2008 | 7 | 192 | Joe Gleason | Canada | D | | | | | | | | | | |
| 2009 | 1 | 28 | Dylan Olsen | Canada | D | 124 | 5 | 17 | 22 | 36 | | | | | |
| 2009 | 2 | 59 | Brandon Pirri | Canada | C | 276 | 72 | 49 | 121 | 91 | | | | | |
| 2009 | 3 | 89 | Daniel Delisle | United States | F | | | | | | | | | | |
| 2009 | 4 | 119 | Byron Froese | Canada | C | 141 | 7 | 13 | 20 | 57 | | | | | |
| 2009 | 5 | 149 | Marcus Kruger | Sweden | C | 520 | 38 | 85 | 123 | 234 | | | | | |
| 2009 | 6 | 177 | David Pacan | Canada | C | | | | | | | | | | |
| 2009 | 7 | 195 | Paul Phillips | United States | D | | | | | | | | | | |
| 2009 | 7 | 209 | David Gilbert | Canada | C | | | | | | | | | | |
| 2010 | 1 | 24 | Kevin Hayes | United States | C | 805 | 185 | 260 | 445 | 233 | | | | | |
| 2010 | 2 | 35 | Ludvig Rensfeldt | Sweden | LW | | | | | | | | | | |
| 2010 | 2 | 54 | Justin Holl | United States | D | 405 | 14 | 83 | 97 | 194 | | | | | |
| 2010 | 2 | 58 | Kent Simpson | Canada | G | 1 | 0 | 0 | 0 | 0 | 0 | 0 | – | 0 | 6.00 |
| 2010 | 2 | 60 | Stephen Johns | United States | D | 167 | 15 | 18 | 33 | 93 | | | | | |
| 2010 | 3 | 90 | Joakim Nordstrom | Sweden | C | 444 | 32 | 43 | 75 | 77 | | | | | |
| 2010 | 4 | 120 | Rob Flick | Canada | C | | | | | | | | | | |
| 2010 | 6 | 151 | Mirko Hofflin | Germany | C | | | | | | | | | | |
| 2010 | 6 | 180 | Nick Mattson | United States | D | | | | | | | | | | |
| 2010 | 7 | 191 | Macmillan Carruth | United States | G | | | | | | | | | | |
| 2011 | 1 | 18 | Mark McNeill | Canada | C | 2 | 0 | 0 | 0 | 0 | | | | | |
| 2011 | 1 | 26 | Phillip Danault | Canada | LW | 786 | 131 | 280 | 411 | 349 | | | | | |
| 2011 | 2 | 36 | Adam Clendening | United States | D | 90 | 4 | 20 | 24 | 49 | | | | | |
| 2011 | 2 | 43 | Brandon Saad | United States | LW | 984 | 269 | 269 | 538 | 182 | | | | | |
| 2011 | 3 | 70 | Michael Paliotta | United States | D | 2 | 0 | 1 | 1 | 4 | | | | | |
| 2011 | 3 | 79 | Klas Dahlbeck | Sweden | D | 170 | 6 | 17 | 23 | 87 | | | | | |
| 2011 | 4 | 109 | Maxim Shalunov | Russia | RW | | | | | | | | | | |
| 2011 | 5 | 139 | Andrew Shaw | Canada | C | 544 | 116 | 131 | 247 | 573 | | | | | |
| 2011 | 6 | 169 | Sam Jardine | Canada | D | | | | | | | | | | |
| 2011 | 7 | 199 | Alex Broadhurst | United States | C | 2 | 0 | 0 | 0 | 2 | | | | | |
| 2011 | 7 | 211 | Johan Mattsson | Sweden | G | | | | | | | | | | |
| 2012 | 1 | 18 | Teuvo Teravainen | Finland | RW | 827 | 184 | 368 | 552 | 144 | | | | | |
| 2012 | 2 | 48 | Dillon Fournier | Canada | RW | | | | | | | | | | |
| 2012 | 3 | 79 | Chris Calnan | United States | RW | | | | | | | | | | |
| 2012 | 5 | 139 | Garret Ross | United States | LW | | | | | | | | | | |
| 2012 | 5 | 149 | Travis Brown | Canada | D | | | | | | | | | | |
| 2012 | 6 | 169 | Vinnie Hinostroza | United States | C | 477 | 65 | 114 | 179 | 144 | | | | | |
| 2012 | 7 | 191 | Brandon Whitney | Canada | G | | | | | | | | | | |
| 2012 | 7 | 199 | Matt Tomkins | Canada | G | 6 | 0 | 0 | 0 | 0 | 3 | 2 | – | 1 | 3.33 |
| 2013 | 1 | 30 | Ryan Hartman | United States | RW | 725 | 162 | 185 | 347 | 700 | | | | | |
| 2013 | 2 | 51 | Carl Dahlstrom | Sweden | D | 67 | 0 | 12 | 12 | 14 | | | | | |
| 2013 | 3 | 74 | John Hayden | United States | C | 272 | 18 | 21 | 39 | 323 | | | | | |
| 2013 | 4 | 111 | Robin Norell | Sweden | D | | | | | | | | | | |
| 2013 | 4 | 121 | Tyler Motte | United States | C | 455 | 53 | 46 | 99 | 116 | | | | | |
| 2013 | 5 | 134 | Luke Johnson | United States | C | 32 | 1 | 1 | 2 | 13 | | | | | |
| 2013 | 6 | 181 | Anthony Louis | United States | C | | | | | | | | | | |
| 2013 | 7 | 211 | Robin Press | Sweden | D | | | | | | | | | | |
| 2014 | 1 | 20 | Nick Schmaltz | United States | C | 670 | 175 | 322 | 497 | 154 | | | | | |
| 2014 | 3 | 83 | Matheson Iacopelli | United States | RW | | | | | | | | | | |
| 2014 | 3 | 88 | Beau Starrett | United States | C | | | | | | | | | | |
| 2014 | 4 | 98 | Fredrik Olofsson | Sweden | LW | 85 | 4 | 9 | 13 | 10 | | | | | |
| 2014 | 5 | 141 | Luc Snuggerud | United States | D | | | | | | | | | | |
| 2014 | 5 | 148 | Andreas Soderberg | Sweden | D | | | | | | | | | | |
| 2014 | 6 | 178 | Dylan Sikura | Canada | C | 58 | 3 | 14 | 17 | 0 | | | | | |
| 2014 | 6 | 179 | Ivan Nalimov | Russia | G | | | | | | | | | | |
| 2014 | 7 | 208 | Jack Ramsey | United States | RW | | | | | | | | | | |
| 2015 | 2 | 54 | Graham Knott | Canada | LW | | | | | | | | | | |
| 2015 | 3 | 91 | Dennis Gilbert | United States | D | 119 | 3 | 18 | 21 | 140 | | | | | |
| 2015 | 4 | 121 | Ryan Shea | United States | D | 150 | 9 | 32 | 41 | 42 | | | | | |
| 2015 | 5 | 151 | Radovan Bondra | Slovakia | RW | | | | | | | | | | |
| 2015 | 6 | 164 | Roy Radke | United States | RW | | | | | | | | | | |
| 2015 | 6 | 181 | Joni Tuulola | Finland | D | | | | | | | | | | |
| 2015 | 7 | 211 | John Dahlstrom | Sweden | RW | | | | | | | | | | |
| 2016 | 2 | 39 | Alex DeBrincat | United States | RW | 696 | 294 | 301 | 595 | 194 | | | | | |
| 2016 | 2 | 45 | Chad Krys | United States | D | | | | | | | | | | |
| 2016 | 2 | 50 | Artur Kayumov | Russia | LW\RW | | | | | | | | | | |
| 2016 | 3 | 83 | Wouter Peeters | Belgium | G | | | | | | | | | | |
| 2016 | 4 | 110 | Lucas Carlsson | Sweden | D | 73 | 4 | 11 | 15 | 28 | | | | | |
| 2016 | 4 | 113 | Nathan Noel | Canada | C | | | | | | | | | | |
| 2016 | 5 | 143 | Mathias From | Denmark | RW\LR | | | | | | | | | | |
| 2016 | 6 | 173 | Blake Hillman | United States | D | 4 | 1 | 0 | 1 | 0 | | | | | |
| 2016 | 7 | 203 | Jake Ryczek | United States | D | | | | | | | | | | |
| 2017 | 1 | 29 | Henri Jokiharju | Finland | D | 448 | 21 | 91 | 112 | 154 | | | | | |
| 2017 | 2 | 57 | Ian Mitchell | Canada | D | 110 | 4 | 15 | 19 | 34 | | | | | |
| 2017 | 3 | 70 | Andrei Altybarmakyan | Russia | RW | | | | | | | | | | |
| 2017 | 3 | 90 | Evan Barratt | United States | C | | | | | | | | | | |
| 2017 | 4 | 112 | Tim Soderlund | Sweden | D/LW | | | | | | | | | | |
| 2017 | 4 | 119 | Roope Laavainen | Finland | D | | | | | | | | | | |
| 2017 | 5 | 144 | Parker Foo | Canada | LW | | | | | | | | | | |
| 2017 | 5 | 150 | Jakub Galvas | Czech Republic | D | 6 | 0 | 0 | 0 | 0 | | | | | |
| 2017 | 7 | 215 | Josh Ess | United States | D | | | | | | | | | | |
| 2018 | 1 | 8 | Adam Boqvist | Sweden | D | 272 | 27 | 76 | 103 | 58 | | | | | |
| 2018 | 1 | 27 | Nicolas Beaudin | Canada | D | 22 | 2 | 4 | 6 | 2 | | | | | |
| 2018 | 3 | 69 | Jake Wise | United States | C | | | | | | | | | | |
| 2018 | 3 | 74 | Niklas Nordgren | Finland | RW | | | | | | | | | | |
| 2018 | 4 | 120 | Philipp Kurashev | Switzerland | C | 360 | 55 | 95 | 150 | 91 | | | | | |
| 2018 | 5 | 139 | Mikael Hakkarainen | Finland | LW | | | | | | | | | | |
| 2018 | 6 | 162 | Alexis Gravel | Canada | G | | | | | | | | | | |
| 2018 | 7 | 193 | Josiah Slavin | United States | LW | 17 | 0 | 1 | 1 | 6 | | | | | |
| 2019 | 1 | 3 | Kirby Dach | Canada | C | 306 | 51 | 85 | 136 | 185 | | | | | |
| 2019 | 2 | 43 | Alex Vlasic | United States | D | 260 | 9 | 61 | 70 | 76 | | | | | |
| 2019 | 4 | 105 | Michal Teply | Czech Republic | LW | | | | | | | | | | |
| 2019 | 4 | 123 | Antti Saarela | Finland | C | | | | | | | | | | |
| 2019 | 6 | 167 | Dominic Basse | United States | G | | | | | | | | | | |
| 2019 | 7 | 194 | Cole Moberg | Canada | D | | | | | | | | | | |
| 2020 | 1 | 17 | Lukas Reichel | Germany | LW | 198 | 23 | 39 | 62 | 36 | | | | | |
| 2020 | 2 | 46 | Drew Commesso | United States | G | 5 | 0 | 0 | 0 | 0 | 2 | 2 | - | 0 | 2.61 |
| 2020 | 3 | 79 | Landon Slaggert | United States | LW | 102 | 6 | 11 | 17 | 43 | | | | | |
| 2020 | 3 | 81 | Wyatt Kaiser | United States | D | 175 | 10 | 25 | 35 | 74 | | | | | |
| 2020 | 4 | 110 | Michael Krutil | Czech Republic | D | | | | | | | | | | |
| 2020 | 5 | 141 | Isaak Phillips | Canada | D | 59 | 2 | 10 | 12 | 33 | | | | | |
| 2020 | 6 | 172 | Chad Yetman | Canada | C | | | | | | | | | | |
| 2020 | 7 | 188 | Louis Crevier | Canada | D | 134 | 10 | 22 | 32 | 77 | | | | | |
| 2021 | 1 | 32 | Nolan Allan | Canada | D | 43 | 1 | 7 | 8 | 16 | | | | | |
| 2021 | 2 | 62 | Colton Dach | Canada | C | 86 | 7 | 13 | 20 | 69 | | | | | |
| 2021 | 3 | 91 | Taige Harding | Canada | D | | | | | | | | | | |
| 2021 | 4 | 105 | Ethan Del Mastro | Canada | D | 45 | 2 | 5 | 7 | 24 | | | | | |
| 2021 | 4 | 108 | Victor Stjernborg | Sweden | C | | | | | | | | | | |
| 2021 | 6 | 172 | Ilya Safonov | Russia | C | | | | | | | | | | |
| 2021 | 7 | 204 | Connor Kelley | United States | D | | | | | | | | | | |
| 2021 | 7 | 216 | Jalen Luypen | Canada | C | | | | | | | | | | |
| 2022 | 1 | 7 | Kevin Korchinski | Canada | D | 105 | 6 | 13 | 19 | 32 | | | | | |
| 2022 | 1 | 13 | Frank Nazar | United States | C | 122 | 28 | 40 | 68 | 50 | | | | | |
| 2022 | 1 | 25 | Sam Rinzel | United States | D | 63 | 4 | 15 | 19 | 44 | | | | | |
| 2022 | 2 | 39 | Paul Ludwinski | Canada | C | | | | | | | | | | |
| 2022 | 2 | 57 | Ryan Greene | Canada | C | 83 | 12 | 17 | 29 | 14 | | | | | |
| 2022 | 3 | 66 | Gavin Hayes | United States | LW | | | | | | | | | | |
| 2022 | 3 | 81 | Samuel Savoie | Canada | LW | | | | | | | | | | |
| 2022 | 3 | 90 | Aidan Thompson | United States | C | | | | | | | | | | |
| 2022 | 6 | 173 | Dominic James | United States | LW | 43 | 7 | 8 | 15 | 8 | | | | | |
| 2022 | 6 | 188 | Nils Juntorp | Sweden | RW | | | | | | | | | | |
| 2022 | 7 | 199 | Riku Tohila | Finland | C | | | | | | | | | | |
| 2023 | 1 | 1 | Connor Bedard | Canada | C | 219 | 75 | 128 | 203 | 148 | | | | | |
| 2023 | 1 | 19 | Oliver Moore | United States | C | 60 | 5 | 18 | 23 | 23 | | | | | |
| 2023 | 2 | 35 | Adam Gajan | Slovakia | G | | | | | | | | | | |
| 2023 | 2 | 44 | Roman Kantserov | Russia | RW | | | | | | | | | | |
| 2023 | 2 | 55 | Martin Misiak | Slovakia | RW | | | | | | | | | | |
| 2023 | 3 | 67 | Nick Lardis | Canada | LW | 41 | 10 | 5 | 15 | 10 | | | | | |
| 2023 | 3 | 93 | Jiri Felcman | Czechia | C | | | | | | | | | | |
| 2023 | 4 | 99 | Alex Pharand | Canada | C | | | | | | | | | | |
| 2023 | 5 | 131 | Marcel Marcel | Czechia | LW | | | | | | | | | | |
| 2023 | 6 | 167 | Milton Oscarson | Sweden | C | | | | | | | | | | |
| 2023 | 7 | 195 | Janne Peltonen | Finland | D | | | | | | | | | | |
| 2024 | 1 | 2 | Artyom Levshunov | Belarus | D | 86 | 2 | 28 | 30 | 52 | | | | | |
| 2024 | 1 | 18 | Sacha Boisvert | Canada | C | 7 | 1 | 1 | 2 | 9 | | | | | |
| 2024 | 1 | 27 | Marek Vanacker | Canada | LW | | | | | | | | | | |
| 2024 | 3 | 67 | John Mustard | Canada | LW | | | | | | | | | | |
| 2024 | 3 | 72 | A.J. Spellacy | Canada | RW | | | | | | | | | | |
| 2024 | 3 | 93 | Jack Pridham | Canada | RW | | | | | | | | | | |
| 2024 | 5 | 138 | Joel Svensson | Sweden | C | | | | | | | | | | |
| 2024 | 6 | 163 | Ty Henry | Canada | D | | | | | | | | | | |
| 2025 | 1 | 3 | Anton Frondell | Sweden | C | 12 | 3 | 6 | 9 | 4 | | | | | |
| 2025 | 1 | 25 | Vaclav Nestrasil | Czech Republic | RW | | | | | | | | | | |
| 2025 | 1 | 29 | Mason West | United States | C | | | | | | | | | | |
| 2025 | 3 | 66 | Nathan Behm | Canada | LW | | | | | | | | | | |
| 2025 | 4 | 98 | Julius Sumpf | Germany | LW | | | | | | | | | | |
| 2025 | 4 | 107 | Parker Holmes | Canada | C | | | | | | | | | | |
| 2025 | 6 | 162 | Aston Cumby | Canada | C | | | | | | | | | | |
| 2025 | 7 | 194 | Ilya Kanarsky | Russia | G | | | | | | | | | | |

== See also ==
- List of Chicago Blackhawks players
