= Guy Delparte =

Canadian ice hockey player

- Born: August 30, 1949 (age 75); Prince Albert, Saskatchewan, Canada
- Height: 5 ft 10 in (178 cm)
- Weight: 175 lb (79 kg; 12 st 7 lb)
- Position: Defence
- Shot: Left
- Played for: Colorado Rockies
- NHL draft: 63rd overall, 1969; Montreal Canadiens
- Playing career: 1969–1981

Guy Phillipe Delparte (born August 30, 1949) is a Canadian former professional ice hockey player. He played in 48 NHL games with the Colorado Rockies during the 1976–77 season. The rest of his career, which lasted from 1969 to 1981, was spent in the minor leagues. Delparte was born in Prince Albert, Saskatchewan.

== Career statistics ==
=== Regular season and playoffs ===
			Regular season					Playoffs
Season	Team	League	GP	G	A	Pts	PIM	GP	G	A	Pts	PIM
1964–65	Sudbury Cub Wolves	NOJHL	28	4	8	12	35	—	—	—	—	—
1965–66	Sudbury Cub-Wolves	NOJHL	37	7	15	22	105	6	1	1	2	2
1966–67	Sudbury Cub-Wolves	NOJHL	38	14	28	42	156	5	0	0	0	18
1967–68	Sudbury Cub-Wolves	NOJHL	32	6	25	31	110	13	5	11	16	33
1968–69	St. Catharines Black Hawks	OHA	24	4	11	15	34	—	—	—	—	—
1968–69	London Knights	OHA	32	6	17	23	62	6	1	2	3	20
1969–70	Johnstown Jets	EHL	68	31	39	70	28	9	1	5	6	0
1970–71	Johnstown Jets	EHL	67	11	27	38	66	10	5	3	8	30
1971–72	Johnstown Jets	EHL	75	25	41	66	66	11	5	8	13	8
1972–73	Nova Scotia Voyageurs	AHL	64	8	12	20	42	8	0	0	0	2
1973–74	Nova Scotia Voyageurs	AHL	69	8	24	32	107	6	0	2	2	17
1974–75	Nova Scotia Voyageurs	AHL	53	10	11	21	127	6	1	2	3	14
1975–76	Oklahoma City Blazers	CHL	72	10	14	24	74	4	0	3	3	0
1976–77	Colorado Rockies	NHL	48	1	8	9	18	—	—	—	—	—
1976–77	Rhode Island Reds	AHL	11	0	3	3	8	—	—	—	—	—
1976–77	Oklahoma City Blazers	CHL	16	4	5	9	10	—	—	—	—	—
1977–78	Maine Mariners	AHL	78	16	21	37	82	12	3	1	4	11
1978–79	Maine Mariners	AHL	67	10	26	36	63	—	—	—	—	—
1979–80	Maine Mariners	AHL	78	10	20	30	111	9	0	3	3	0
1980–81	Springfield Indians	AHL	73	3	7	10	81	7	1	3	4	24
AHL totals			493	65	124	189	621	48	5	11	16	68
NHL totals			48	1	8	9	18	—	—	—	—	—
