= Milt Black =

Canadian ice hockey player (born 1949)

- Born: June 20, 1949 (age 77) St. Boniface, Manitoba, Canada
- Height: 6 ft 0 in (183 cm)
- Weight: 190 lb (86 kg; 13 st 8 lb)
- Shot: Right
- Played for: WHA; Winnipeg Jets
- NHL draft: 36th overall, 1969; Chicago Blackhawks
- Playing career: 1970–1978

Milton James Black (born June 20, 1949) is a Canadian retired professional ice hockey forward. He played in 186 games in the World Hockey Association with the Winnipeg Jets.

== Career statistics ==
=== Regular season and playoffs ===
			Regular season					Playoffs
Season	Team	League	GP	G	A	Pts	PIM	GP	G	A	Pts	PIM
1967–68	Winnipeg Jets	WCJHL	60	37	36	73	38	—	—	—	—	—
1968–69	Winnipeg Jets	WCHL	53	20	44	64	57	—	—	—	—	—
1969–70	Winnipeg Jets	WCHL	54	23	33	56	67	—	—	—	—	—
1970–71	Dallas Black Hawks	CHL	58	13	16	29	50	10	3	2	5	6
1971–72	Dallas Black Hawks	CHL	32	9	9	18	39	6	1	1	2	2
1972–73	Winnipeg Jets	WHA	75	18	16	34	31	14	1	3	4	2
1973–74	Jacksonville Barons	AHL	20	8	11	19	14	—	—	—	—	—
1973–74	Winnipeg Jets	WHA	47	6	9	15	14	4	1	1	2	8
1974–75	Winnipeg Jets	WHA	64	4	6	10	10	—	—	—	—	—
1975–76	Sodertalje SK	SEL	32	18	10	28	44	—	—	—	—	—
1976–77	Sodertalje SK	SEL	35	10	4	14	26	—	—	—	—	—
1977–78	Augsburg EV	2.GBun	—	80	0	0	0	—	—	—	—	—
WHA totals			186	28	31	59	55	18	2	4	6	10
