= Dave Hudson =

Canadian ice hockey player

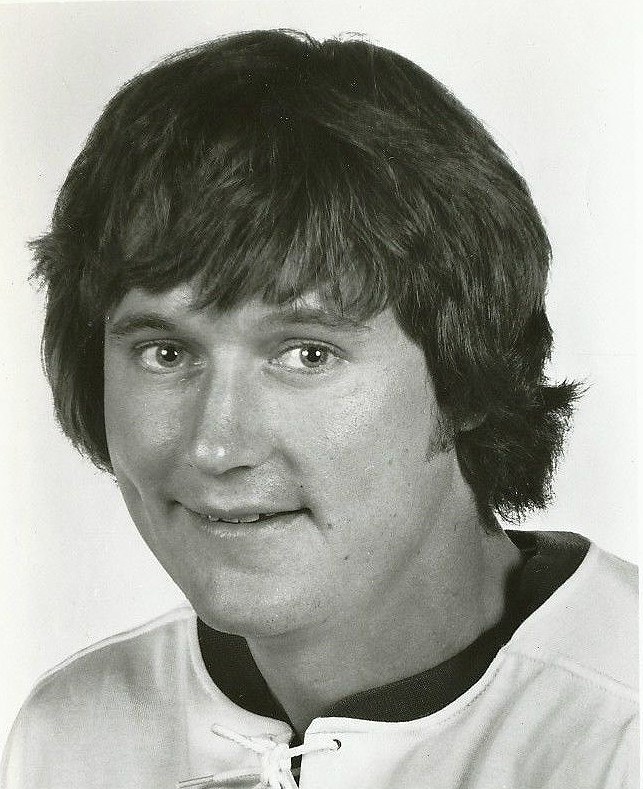
- New York Islanders 1973
- Born: December 28, 1949 (age 75); St. Thomas, Ontario, Canada
- Height: 6 ft 0 in (183 cm)
- Weight: 185 lb (84 kg; 13 st 3 lb)
- Position: Centre
- Shot: Left
- Played for: New York Islanders; Kansas City Scouts; Colorado Rockies
- NHL draft: 71st overall, 1969; Chicago Black Hawks
- Playing career: 1969–1978

David Richard Hudson (born December 28, 1949) is a Canadian former professional ice hockey player who played 409 games in the National Hockey League in the 1970s, with the New York Islanders, Kansas City Scouts, and Colorado Rockies. Hudson played for the University of North Dakota before turning professional in 1970. Selected by the Chicago Black Hawks in the 1969 NHL Amateur Draft, he spent two years in their system before being claimed by the expansion Islanders, making his NHL debut with them in 1972. Hudson took the opening faceoff during the first-ever game in Islanders history.

"Hud" was again selected by an expansion team, the Scouts in 1974, playing in Kansas City for two years, and a further two when the team relocated to Colorado, retiring in 1978. In his career, Hudson scored 59 goals, 124 assists, and 183 points. Hudson was the last Islander to wear number 5 before Denis Potvin.

Following his professional hockey career, Hudson settled in Texas, eventually founding his own commercial printing business, Colormark.

== Career statistics ==
=== Regular season and playoffs ===
			Regular season					Playoffs
Season	Team	League	GP	G	A	Pts	PIM	GP	G	A	Pts	PIM
1966–67	University of North Dakota	WCHA	—	—	—	—	—	—	—	—	—	—
1967–68	University of North Dakota	WCHA	33	8	6	14	6	—	—	—	—	—
1968–69	University of North Dakota	WCHA	29	16	14	30	16	—	—	—	—	—
1969–70	University of North Dakota	WCHA	30	16	13	29	28	—	—	—	—	—
1970–71	Dallas Black Hawks	CHL	69	17	37	54	57	7	0	1	1	19
1971–72	Dallas Black Hawks	CHL	63	29	34	63	49	12	7	7	14	12
1972–73	New York Islanders	NHL	69	12	19	31	17	—	—	—	—	—
1973–74	New York Islanders	NHL	63	2	10	12	7	—	—	—	—	—
1973–74	Fort Worth Wings	CHL	10	5	3	8	19	—	—	—	—	—
1974–75	Kansas City Scouts	NHL	70	9	32	41	27	—	—	—	—	—
1975–76	Kansas City Scouts	NHL	74	11	20	31	12	—	—	—	—	—
1976–77	Colorado Rockies	NHL	73	15	21	36	14	—	—	—	—	—
1976–77	Rhode Island Reds	AHL	5	0	2	2	2	—	—	—	—	—
1977–78	Colorado Rockies	NHL	60	10	22	32	12	2	1	1	2	0
NHL totals			409	59	124	183	89	2	1	1	2	0
