= 1969 NHL amateur draft =

1969 North American ice hockey draft

General information
- Date: June 12, 1969
- Location: Queen Elizabeth Hotel; Montreal, Quebec, Canada

Overview
- 84 total selections in 10 rounds
- First selection: (Canada) Rejean Houle (Montreal Canadiens)
- Hall of Famers: 1: C Bobby Clarke

The 1969 NHL amateur draft was the seventh draft for the National Hockey League. It was held at the Queen Elizabeth Hotel in Montreal. This draft is notable for being the first NHL draft to be conducted after the league ended direct sponsorship of junior hockey.

The last active players in the NHL from this draft class were Ivan Boldirev and Butch Goring, who both played their last NHL games in the 1984–85 season.

== Selections by round ==
Below are listed the selections in the 1969 NHL amateur draft.

= NHL All-Star team ·	= NHL All-Star (Note: Players are identified as an All-Star if they were selected for the All-Star game at any time in their career.) ·	= Hall of Famers

=== Round one ===
#	Player	Nationality	NHL team	College/junior/club team
1	Rejean Houle (RW)	Canada	Montreal Canadiens	Montreal Junior Canadiens (OHA)
2	Marc Tardif (LW)	Canada	Montreal Canadiens	Montreal Junior Canadiens (OHA)
3	Don Tannahill (LW)	Canada	Boston Bruins (from Minnesota)^{1}	Niagara Falls Flyers (OHA)
4	Frank Spring (RW)	Canada	Boston Bruins (from Pittsburgh)^{2}	Edmonton Oil Kings (WCHL)
5	Dick Redmond (D)	Canada	Minnesota North Stars (from Los Angeles via Montreal)^{3}	St. Catharines Black Hawks (OHA)
6	Bob Currier (C)	Canada	Philadelphia Flyers	Cornwall Royals (QMJHL)
7	Tony Featherstone (RW)	Canada	Oakland Seals	Peterborough Petes (OHA)
8	Andre Dupont (D)	Canada	New York Rangers (from St. Louis)^{4}	Montreal Junior Canadiens (OHA)
9	Ernie Moser (RW)	Canada	Toronto Maple Leafs	Estevan Bruins (WCHL)
10	Jim Rutherford (G)	Canada	Detroit Red Wings	Hamilton Red Wings (OHA)
11	Ivan Boldirev (C)	Canada	Boston Bruins	Oshawa Generals (OHA)
12	Pierre Jarry (LW)	Canada	New York Rangers	Ottawa 67's (OHA)
13	J. P. Bordeleau (RW)	Canada	Chicago Black Hawks	Montreal Junior Canadiens (OHA)

1. The Minnesota North Stars' first-round pick went to the Boston Bruins as the result of a trade on May 7, 1969 that sent Barry Gibbs and Tom Williams to Minnesota in exchange for future considerations (Fred O'Donnell) and this pick.
2. The Pittsburgh Penguins' first-round pick went to the Boston Bruins as the result of a trade on May 21, 1968 that sent Pittsburgh's first-round pick and cash to Boston in exchange for Jean Pronovost and John Arbour.
3. The Montreal Canadiens' first-round pick went to the Minnesota North Stars as the result of a trade where Minnesota promised Montreal that they would not draft Dick Duff in the 1969 intra-league draft.
  Montreal previously acquired this pick as the result of a trade on June 11, 1968 that sent Gerry Desjardins to Los Angeles in exchange for a first-round pick in 1972 and this pick.
4. The St. Louis Blues' first-round pick went to the New York Rangers as the result of a trade on June 10, 1969 that sent Phil Goyette to St. Louis in exchange for this pick.

=== Round two ===
#	Player	Nationality	NHL team	College/junior/club team
14	Dennis O'Brien (D)	Canada	Minnesota North Stars	St. Catharines Black Hawks (OHA)
15	Rick Kessell (C)	Canada	Pittsburgh Penguins	Oshawa Generals (OHA)
16	Dale Hoganson (D)	Canada	Los Angeles Kings	Estevan Bruins (WCHL)
17	Bobby Clarke (C)	Canada	Philadelphia Flyers	Flin Flon Bombers (WCHL)
18	Ron Stackhouse (D)	Canada	Oakland Seals	Peterborough Petes (OHA)
19	Mike Lowe (LW)	Canada	St. Louis Blues	Loyola College (CIAU)
20	Doug Brindley (LW)	Canada	Toronto Maple Leafs	Niagara Falls Flyers (OHA)
21	Ron Garwasiuk (LW)	Canada	Detroit Red Wings	Regina Pats (SJHL)
22	Art Quoquochi (RW)	Canada	Boston Bruins	Montreal Junior Canadiens (OHA)
23	Bert Wilson (LW)	Canada	New York Rangers	London Knights (OHA)
24	Larry Romanchych (C)	Canada	Chicago Black Hawks	Flin Flon Bombers (WCHL)

=== Round three ===
#	Player	Nationality	NHL team	College/junior/club team
25	Gilles Gilbert (G)	Canada	Minnesota North Stars	London Knights (OHA)
26	Michel Briere (C)	Canada	Pittsburgh Penguins	Shawinigan Bruins (QMJHL)
27	Gregg Boddy (D)	Canada	Los Angeles Kings	Edmonton Oil Kings (WCHL)
28	Willie Brossart (LW)	Canada	Philadelphia Flyers	Estevan Bruins (WCHL)
29	Don O'Donoghue (RW)	Canada	Oakland Seals	St. Catharines Black Hawks (OHA)
30	Bernie Gagnon (C)	Canada	St. Louis Blues	Michigan Wolverines (NCAA)
31	Larry McIntyre (D)	Canada	Toronto Maple Leafs	Moose Jaw Canucks (SJHL)
32	Bobby Sheehan (C)	United States	Montreal Canadiens	St. Catharines Black Hawks (OHA)
33	Wayne Hawrysh (RW)	Canada	Detroit Red Wings	Flin Flon Bombers (WCHL)
34	Nels Jacobson (LW)	Canada	Boston Bruins	Winnipeg Jets (WCHL)
35	Kevin Morrison (LW)	Canada	New York Rangers	Saint-Jérôme Alouettes (QMJHL)
36	Milt Black (RW)	Canada	Chicago Black Hawks	Winnipeg Jets (WCHL)

=== Round four ===
#	Player	Nationality	NHL team	College/junior/club team
37	Fred O'Donnell (RW)	Canada	Minnesota North Stars	Oshawa Generals (OHA)
38	Yvon Labre (D)	Canada	Pittsburgh Penguins	Toronto Marlboros (OHA)
39	Bruce Landon (G)	Canada	Los Angeles Kings	Peterborough Petes (OHA)
40	Michel Belhumeur (G)	Canada	Philadelphia Flyers	Drummondville Rangers (QMJHL)
41	Pierre Farmer (D)	Canada	Oakland Seals	Shawinigan Bruins (QMJHL)
42	Vic Teal (RW)	Canada	St. Louis Blues	St. Catharines Black Hawks (OHA)
43	Frank Hughes (RW)	Canada	Toronto Maple Leafs	Edmonton Oil Kings (WCHL)
44	Murray Anderson (D)	Canada	Montreal Canadiens	Flin Flon Bombers (WCHL)
45	Wayne Chernecki (C)	Canada	Detroit Red Wings	Winnipeg Jets (WCHL)
46	Ron Fairbrother (LW)	Canada	Boston Bruins	Saskatoon Blades (WCHL)
47	Bruce Hellemond (LW)	Canada	New York Rangers	Moose Jaw Canucks (SJHL)
48	Darryl Maggs (D)	Canada	Chicago Black Hawks	Calgary Centennials (WCHL)

=== Round five ===
#	Player	Nationality	NHL team	College/junior/club team
49	Pierre Jutras (LW)	Canada	Minnesota North Stars	Shawinigan Bruins (QMJHL)
50	Ed Patenaude (RW)	Canada	Pittsburgh Penguins	Calgary Centennials (WCHL)
51	Butch Goring (C)	Canada	Los Angeles Kings	Dauphin Kings (MJHL)
52	Dave Schultz (LW)	Canada	Philadelphia Flyers	Sorel Black Hawks (QMJHL)
53	Warren Harrison (C)	Canada	Oakland Seals	Sorel Black Hawks (QMJHL)
54	Brian Glenwright (LW)	Canada	St. Louis Blues	Kitchener Rangers (OHA)
55	Brian Spencer (LW)	Canada	Toronto Maple Leafs	Swift Current Broncos (WCHL)
56	Gary Doyle (G)	Canada	Montreal Canadiens	Ottawa 67's (OHA)
57	Wally Olds (D)	United States	Detroit Red Wings	Minnesota Golden Gophers (NCAA)
58	Jerry Wright (C)	Canada	Boston Bruins	Calgary Centennials (WCHL)
59	Gord Smith (D)	Canada	New York Rangers	Cornwall Royals (QMJHL)
60	Mike Baumgartner (D)	United States	Chicago Black Hawks	North Dakota Fighting Sioux (NCAA)

=== Round six ===
Tommi Salmelainen was the first European to be drafted by a National Hockey League team.

#	Player	Nationality	NHL team	College/junior/club team
61	Rob Walton (C)	Canada	Minnesota North Stars	Niagara Falls Flyers (OHA)
62	Paul Hoganson (G)	Canada	Pittsburgh Penguins	Toronto Marlboros (OHA)
63	Guy Delparte (LW)	Canada	Montreal Canadiens (from Los Angeles)^{1}	London Knights (OHA)
64	Don Saleski (RW)	Canada	Philadelphia Flyers	Regina Pats (SJHL)
65	Neil Nicholson (D)	Canada	Oakland Seals	London Knights (OHA)
66	Tommi Salmelainen (LW)	Finland	St. Louis Blues	HIFK (Finland)
67	Bob Neufeld (LW)	Canada	Toronto Maple Leafs	Dauphin Kings (MJHL)
68	Lynn Powis (C)	Canada	Montreal Canadiens	Denver Pioneers (NCAA)
69	Jim Jones (D)	Canada	Boston Bruins	Peterborough Petes (OHA)
70	Dale Yutsyk (LW)	Canada	St. Louis Blues (from New York)^{2}	Colorado College Tigers (NCAA)
71	Dave Hudson (C)	Canada	Chicago Black Hawks	North Dakota Fighting Sioux (NCAA)

1. The Los Angeles Kings' sixth-round pick went to the Montreal Canadiens as the result of a trade on June 12, 1969 that sent cash to Los Angeles in exchange for this pick.
2. The New York Rangers' sixth-round pick went to the St. Louis Blues as the result of a trade on June 12, 1969 that sent cash to New York in exchange for this pick.

=== Round seven ===
#	Player	Nationality	NHL team	College/junior/club team
72	Rick Thompson (D)	Canada	Minnesota North Stars	Niagara Falls Flyers (OHA)
73	Bob Collyard (C)	United States	St. Louis Blues (from Pittsburgh)^{1}	Colorado College Tigers (NCAA)
74	Ian Wilkie (G)	Canada	Montreal Canadiens (from Los Angeles)^{2}	Edmonton Oil Kings (WCHL)
75	Dale Power (C)	Canada	Montreal Canadiens	Peterborough Petes (OHA)
76	Pete Vipond (LW)	Canada	Oakland Seals	Oshawa Generals (OHA)
77	David Pulkkinen (RW)	Canada	St. Louis Blues	Oshawa Generals (OHA)

1. The Pittsburgh Penguins' seventh-round pick went to the St. Louis Blues as the result of a trade on June 12, 1969 that sent cash to Pittsburgh in exchange for this pick.
2. The Los Angeles Kings' seventh-round pick went to the Montreal Canadiens as the result of a trade on June 12, 1969 that sent cash to Los Angeles in exchange for this pick.

=== Round eight ===
#	Player	Nationality	NHL team	College/junior/club team
78	Cal Russell (RW)	Canada	Minnesota North Stars	Hamilton Red Wings (OHA)
79	Frank Hamill (RW)	Canada	Montreal Canadiens (from Pittsburgh)^{1}	Toronto Marlboros (OHA)
80	Patrick Lange (G)	Canada	St. Louis Blues (from Los Angeles)^{2}	Sudbury Wolves (NOJHL)
81	Claude Chartre (C)	Canada	Philadelphia Flyers	Drummondville Rangers (QMJHL)

1. The Pittsburgh Penguins' eight-round pick went to the Montreal Canadiens as the result of a trade on June 12, 1969 that sent cash to Pittsburgh in exchange for this pick.
2. The Los Angeles Kings' eight-round pick went to the St. Louis Blues as the result of a trade on June 12, 1969 that sent cash to Los Angeles in exchange for this pick.

=== Round nine ===
#	Player	Nationality	NHL team	College/junior/club team
82	John Converse (F)	Canada	St. Louis Blues	Estevan Bruins (WCHL)
83	Gilles Drolet (D)	Canada	Montreal Canadiens	Quebec Remparts (QMJHL)

=== Round ten ===
#	Player	Nationality	NHL team	College/junior/club team
84	Darrel Knibbs (C)	Canada	Montreal Canadiens	Lethbridge Sugar Kings (AJHL)

= NHL All-Star team ·	= NHL All-Star ·	= Hall of Famers

== Draftees based on nationality ==
Rank	Country	Amount
	North America	83
1	Canada	79
2	United States	4
	Europe	1
3	Finland	1

== See also ==
- 1969–70 NHL season
- List of NHL players
