= Larry Romanchych =

Canadian ice hockey player

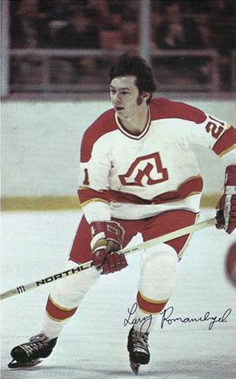
- Born: September 7, 1949 (age 76) Vancouver, British Columbia, Canada
- Height: 6 ft 1 in (185 cm)
- Weight: 180 lb (82 kg; 12 st 12 lb)
- Position: Right Wing
- Shot: Right
- Played for: Chicago Black Hawks; Atlanta Flames
- NHL draft: 24th overall, 1969; Chicago Black Hawks
- Playing career: 1970–1977

Larry Romanchych (born September 7, 1949) is a Canadian former professional ice hockey player who played 298 games in the National Hockey League with the Chicago Black Hawks and Atlanta Flames from 1970 to 1977. He retired in 1978 from professional hockey.

In 1979, Romanchych founded Crescent Moving & Storage, Ltd. in White Rock, British Columbia.

== Career statistics ==
=== Regular season and playoffs ===
			Regular season					Playoffs
Season	Team	League	GP	G	A	Pts	PIM	GP	G	A	Pts	PIM
1967–68	Brandon Wheat Kings	WCHL	53	20	23	43	24	8	1	4	5	2
1968–69	Flin Flon Bombers	WCHL	55	31	25	56	40	18	11	8	19	6
1969–70	Dallas Black Hawks	CHL	57	21	12	33	38	—	—	—	—	—
1970–71	Chicago Black Hawks	NHL	10	0	2	2	2	—	—	—	—	—
1970–71	Dallas Black Hawks	CHL	65	18	34	52	26	10	2	4	6	4
1971–72	Dallas Black Hawks	CHL	60	21	23	44	31	12	3	4	7	28
1972–73	Atlanta Flames	NHL	70	18	30	48	39	—	—	—	—	—
1973–74	Atlanta Flames	NHL	73	22	29	51	33	4	2	2	4	4
1974–75	Atlanta Flames	NHL	53	8	12	20	16	—	—	—	—	—
1975–76	Atlanta Flames	NHL	67	16	19	35	8	2	0	0	0	0
1976–77	Atlanta Flames	NHL	25	4	5	9	4	1	0	0	0	0
1976–77	Tulsa Oilers	CHL	37	20	28	48	18	—	—	—	—	—
1977–78	Maine Mariners	AHL	79	17	34	51	23	12	8	4	12	6
NHL totals			298	68	97	165	102	7	2	2	4	4
