= Jack Riley (ice hockey, born 1919) =

- Riley (left) in February 1968 congratulating the 7,000,000th patron of the Civic Arena in Pittsburgh
- Born: June 14, 1919 Toronto, Ontario, Canada
- Died: July 13, 2016 (aged 97) Scott Township, Pennsylvania, U.S.
- Height: 5 ft 9 in (175 cm)
- Weight: 178 lb (81 kg; 12 st 10 lb)
- Position: Right wing
- Shot: Right
- Played for: Baltimore Orioles; Hershey Bears; Philadelphia Falcons; Washington Lions; Tulsa Oilers
- Playing career: 1938–1950

John Thomas Riley (June 14, 1919 – July 13, 2016) was a Canadian professional ice hockey player and executive. He was the first general manager of the Pittsburgh Penguins in the National Hockey League. He served the Penguins from their founding through the spring of 1970, and then in a second term from January 1972 to January 1974. In 1975, he became Commissioner of the Southern Hockey League. From 1979 to 1983 he served as President of the International Hockey League.

== Biography ==
=== Early life ===
Riley was born in Toronto, Ontario. As a teenager, he began an 11-year playing career, mostly in the Eastern Hockey League and the American Hockey League. Riley played for the Baltimore Orioles, Baltimore Clippers, Philadelphia Falcons, Hershey Bears, Washington Lions, and Tulsa Oilers during his career. After retiring as a player in 1950, he became the Lions' head coach and remained with the team until 1953. In 1959, he became general manager of the American Hockey League's Rochester Americans. He served in that capacity until 1964 and was president of the AHL until 1966 before accepting a general manager position with one of the National Hockey League's new expansion teams.

=== Pittsburgh Penguins ===
When the NHL decided to expand in 1967. Riley had offers to be a general manager from the Pittsburgh Penguins, St. Louis Blues and the Philadelphia Flyers. Riley decided on Pittsburgh, because of its proximity to his family in Toronto, and was hired by the Penguins' owner Jack McGregor, who also served as the team's president and CEO.

As the Penguins' general manager, Riley helped pick the team's nickname and the team's uniform colors, which were Columbia blue, navy blue, and white. He then hired George "Red" Sullivan as the team's first coach. During the 1967 Expansion Draft, the NHL made it hard for the new clubs, by limiting the number of quality players the established Original Six teams could leave unprotected in the expansion draft. The league also placed the two developmental teams controlled by each of the established teams off-limits. The expansion teams would have to depend mainly on free agents signed by Riley from the Pittsburgh Hornets, who were the defending AHL champions. Riley signed the Penguins' first player Les Binkley, who would play for the Penguins for parts of five seasons. Former New York Rangers star Andy Bathgate, who would lead the West Division in scoring at age 34 was selected late in the draft by Jack McGregor. The Penguins payroll in their first season was $350,000.

Under Riley, the Penguins finished fifth in the league in their first 2 seasons. In their third year, the Penguins placed second in the West Division and beat the Oakland Seals, 4-0, in the first round of the playoffs before losing to St. Louis in six games in the league semifinals. In the third round of the 1969 NHL Draft, Riley selected forward Michel Briere. Briere had a successful rookie season and looked to be a player that the Penguins could be built around. He was critically injured in a car crash in Quebec a few weeks after the season, however, and remained in a coma for 11 months before he died. He was 21. During those 11 months, Riley was a frequent visitor of his at the hospital.

=== Post hockey ===
In January 1974, Riley was replaced as the club's general manager by his assistant, Jack Button. He remained with the team, helping as a scout. Decades later, he worked as a replay judge during Penguins' games at Mellon Arena and as a consultant to the IHL and AHL into his 80s.

Riley was an active member of the Penguins' Alumni Association. In 2000, Riley was elected to the Pittsburgh Penguins' Hall of Fame. He was in attendance as the "Honorary GM" at the 2011 NHL Winter Classic Alumni Game at Heinz Field between alumni of the Penguins and Washington Capitals. Riley lived in South Hills with his daughter, Barbara, since his wife died in 1988. He jogged daily from his 30s into his 70s. He maintained a friendship with fellow former Penguins' general manager Eddie Johnston and still attended Penguins' games into his 90s. The locker room at the Penguins' current arena, Consol Energy Center, contains a mural in the team's locker room that features Riley for his contribution to the franchise.

Riley died on July 13, 2016, in Scott Township (just outside of Pittsburgh) at the age of 97. His death occurred less than a month after the Penguins' franchise, that he had helped build, won its fourth Stanley Cup title. In a press release, the Penguins stated that "We are deeply saddened by the passing of Jack Riley." The Penguins added that the organization was "built on the shoulders of hard-working people like Jack, and the loss hits home as the team’s 50th anniversary is set to be celebrated during the upcoming campaign."

== Career statistics ==
=== Player statistics ===
| | | | Regular Season | | | | | Playoffs |
| Season | Team | League | GP | G | A | Pts | PIM | GP | G | A | Pts | PIM |
|---|---|---|---|---|---|---|---|---|---|---|---|---|
| 1938-39 | Baltimore Orioles | EHL | 20 | 7 | 9 | 16 | 2 |
| 1939-40 | Baltimore Orioles | EHL | No EHL stats available |
| 1940-41 | Baltimore Orioles | EHL | No EHL stats available |
| 1941-42 | Baltimore Orioles | EHL | No EHL stats available |
| 1941-42 | Philadelphia Falcons-Hershey Bears | AHL | 9 | 4 | 0 | 4 | 0 | 10 | 0 | 0 | 0 | 2 |
| 1944-45 | Hershey Bears | AHL | 35 | 5 | 7 | 12 | 7 | 6 | 0 | 0 | 0 | 0 |
| 1944-45 | Philadelphia Falcons | EHL | No EHL stats available |
| 1945-46 | Baltimore Clippers | EHL | 48 | 31 | 27 | 58 | 34 |
| 1946-47 | Washington Lions | EHL | 39 | 19 | 21 | 40 | 24 |
| 1947-48 | Washington Lions | AHL | 17 | 5 | 7 | 12 | 2 |
| 1949-50 | Tulsa Oilers | USHL | 2 | 0 | 0 | 0 | 0 |

=== Coaching record ===
| Team | Year | Regular season | | | | | | |
| Team | Year | G | W | L | T | OTL | Pct | Result |
|---|---|---|---|---|---|---|---|---|
| Baltimore Clippers | 1945-46‡* | No EHL stats available | | | | | | |
| Washington Lions | 1946-47* | 56 | 24 | 24 | 8 | 0 | .500 | |
| Washington Lions | 1947-48 | 68 | 17 | 45 | 6 | 0 | .294 | Out of Playoffs |
| Tulsa Oilers | 1948-49 | 66 | 33 | 23 | 10 | 0 | .576 | Lost in Finals |
| Washington Lions | 1951-52 | 36 | 9 | 24 | 3 | 0 | .292 | Out of Playoffs |
| Washington Lions | 1952-53 | 60 | 26 | 31 | 3 | 0 | .458 | Lost in round 1 |
| Rochester Americans | 1960-61‡ | 37 | 18 | 18 | 1 | 0 | .500 | Out of Playoffs |

‡ Denotes mid-season replacement, * Denotes role as a player-coach

=== NHL GM Statistics ===
| Term | Team | G | W | L | T | OTL | PTS | PCT |
|---|---|---|---|---|---|---|---|---|
| June 6, 1967 – May 1, 1970 | Pittsburgh Penguins | 226 | 73 | 117 | 36 | – | 182 | .403 |
| January 29, 1972 – January 13, 1974 | Pittsburgh Penguins | 149 | 57 | 73 | 19 | – | 133 | .446 |

| Preceded by Position created | General Manager of the Pittsburgh Penguins; 1967–70 | Succeeded by Red Kelly |
| Preceded by Red Kelly | General Manager of the Pittsburgh Penguins; 1972–74 | Succeeded by Jack Button |
