= Kyle Dubas =

Ice Hockey executive

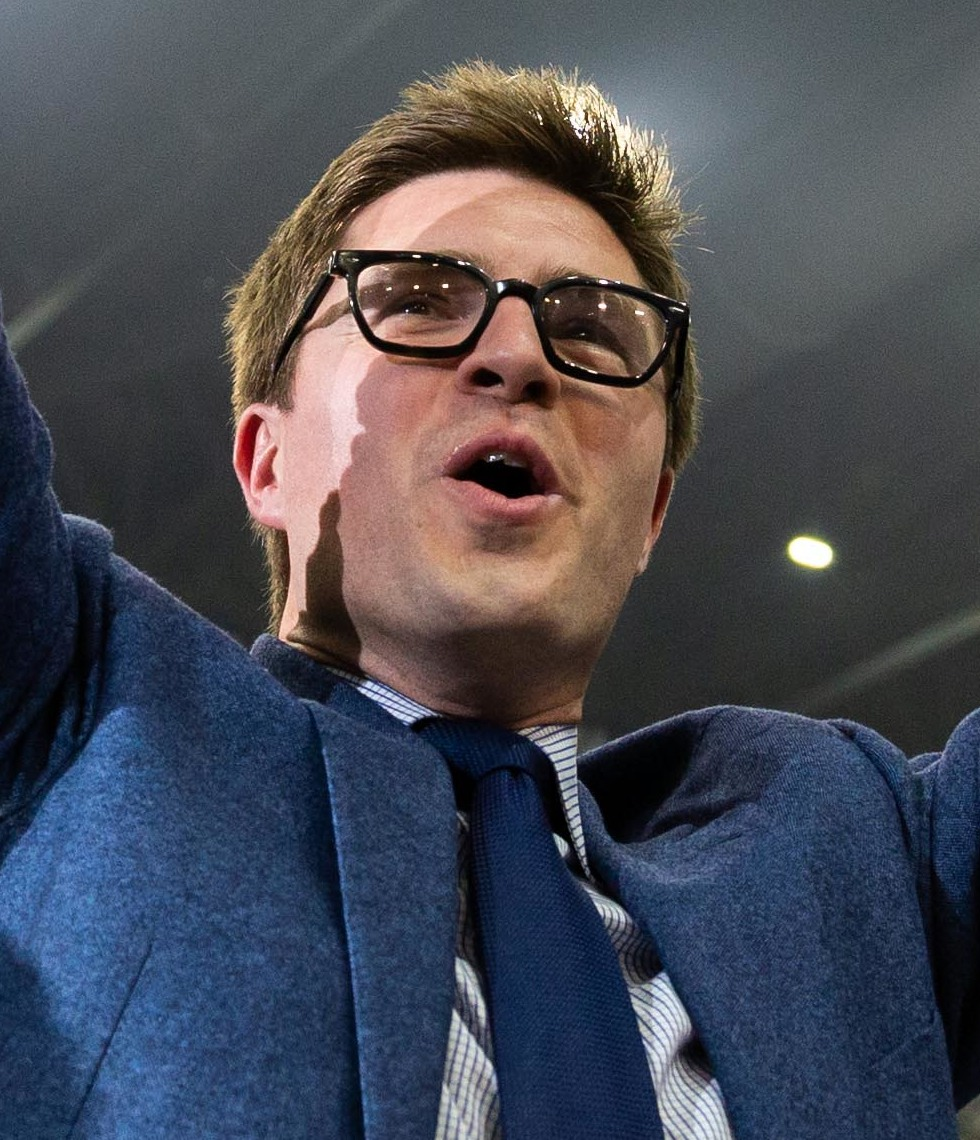
- Dubas in 2018
- Born: November 29, 1985 (age 40); Sault Ste. Marie, Ontario, Canada
- Education: Brock University
- Occupation: Ice hockey executive
- Years active: 2011–present
- Employer(s): Soo Greyhounds (2011–2014); MLSE (2014–2023); FSG (2023–present)
- Organization: Pittsburgh Penguins
- Title: President of hockey operations General manager

Kyle Benjamin Dubas (/duːbəs/ DOO-bəss; born November 29, 1985) is a Canadian ice hockey executive who is the president of hockey operations and general manager for the Pittsburgh Penguins of the National Hockey League (NHL). He previously served as the general manager of the Toronto Maple Leafs.

He attended Brock University and graduated with a degree in sports management, and started his career by briefly acting as a player agent. Afterward, he served in various roles with the Sault Ste. Marie Greyhounds of the Ontario Hockey League (OHL), including a term as the team's general manager. Dubas joined the Maple Leafs organization as an assistant general manager in 2014, and played a key role in developing the Toronto Marlies of the American Hockey League (AHL). In 2018, the Marlies captured the Calder Cup as AHL champions. At the time of his hiring by the Maple Leafs, Dubas was the second youngest general manager in NHL history, behind John Chayka of the Arizona Coyotes, as well as the second youngest GM of the Maple Leafs behind Gord Stellick.

== Early life ==
Dubas was born and raised in Sault Ste. Marie, Ontario. As a child Dubas played ice hockey, until concussions caused him to stop playing at 14. His father was an intern with the Sault Ste. Marie Greyhounds of the Ontario Hockey League (OHL) and his grandfather, Walter Dubas (1929–2012), had coached the team from 1960 to 1967. Dubas attended Brock University, graduating in sport management (BSM). While at Brock, Dubas worked as a scout for the Greyhounds. In 2015, Dubas was named the first recipient of Brock's Outstanding Young Alumni Award, for his accomplishments after graduation. Brock University has credited sharp increases in the popularity of their sports management program with Dubas' success early in his career, with one professor noting, "We absolutely have seen, anecdotally, so many students who want to be Kyle Dubas when they graduate." After graduation, Dubas offered to assist with Brock University's program as either an instructor or teaching assistant.

== Professional career ==
=== Player agent ===
Dubas was the youngest player agent ever certified by the National Hockey League Players' Association (NHLPA). He worked with Uptown Sports Management and represented Kyle Clifford and Andrew Desjardins. Dubas set up offices in Europe; however, challenges with clients leaving for other agents resulted in Dubas looking for alternate careers in ice hockey.

=== Team executive ===
==== Sault Ste. Marie Greyhounds ====
Dubas was hired as the general manager of the Sault Ste. Marie Greyhounds of the OHL in 2011. He attended his interview with a detailed plan to improve the team, which had struggled in recent years. The Greyhounds initially were looking for an experienced candidate for the general manager position, but Dubas' interview was so impressive, that he was the board's unanimous choice. During his tenure with the Greyhounds, this plan became known as "The Rising" after the Bruce Springsteen song of the same name. Dubas had been involved with the Greyhounds organization since he was a child, starting out as a stick boy and dressing room attendant when he was 11. After assuming the general manager role, he hired Sheldon Keefe as head coach. The combination of Keefe and Dubas resulted in significant on ice improvement for the Greyhounds, and during Dubas' last season as general manager of the Greyhounds, they finished second overall in the OHL, though he ultimately fell short of a championship.

==== Maple Leaf Sports & Entertainment ====
In 2014, Toronto Maple Leafs team president Brendan Shanahan reached out to Dubas about the possibility of joining the organization. Their initial meeting lasted nine hours. Dubas was hired by Shanahan as an assistant general manager for the Maple Leafs in July 2014. The Maple Leafs organization deflected concerns about his age at the time he was hired, with general manager Dave Nonis saying "...Age was never a factor. It's whether or not you can do the job, and it was clear to us quickly that he's going to be good at it." In January 2015, Forbes named Dubas amongst its 30 Under 30 brightest young stars in the sport industry. As an assistant general manager for the club, Dubas played parts in many aspects of the organization, including personnel management and analytics, through the team's research and development group. Dubas and Mark Hunter filled the role of interim general manager for the Maple Leafs in 2015, after Nonis was fired by the club.

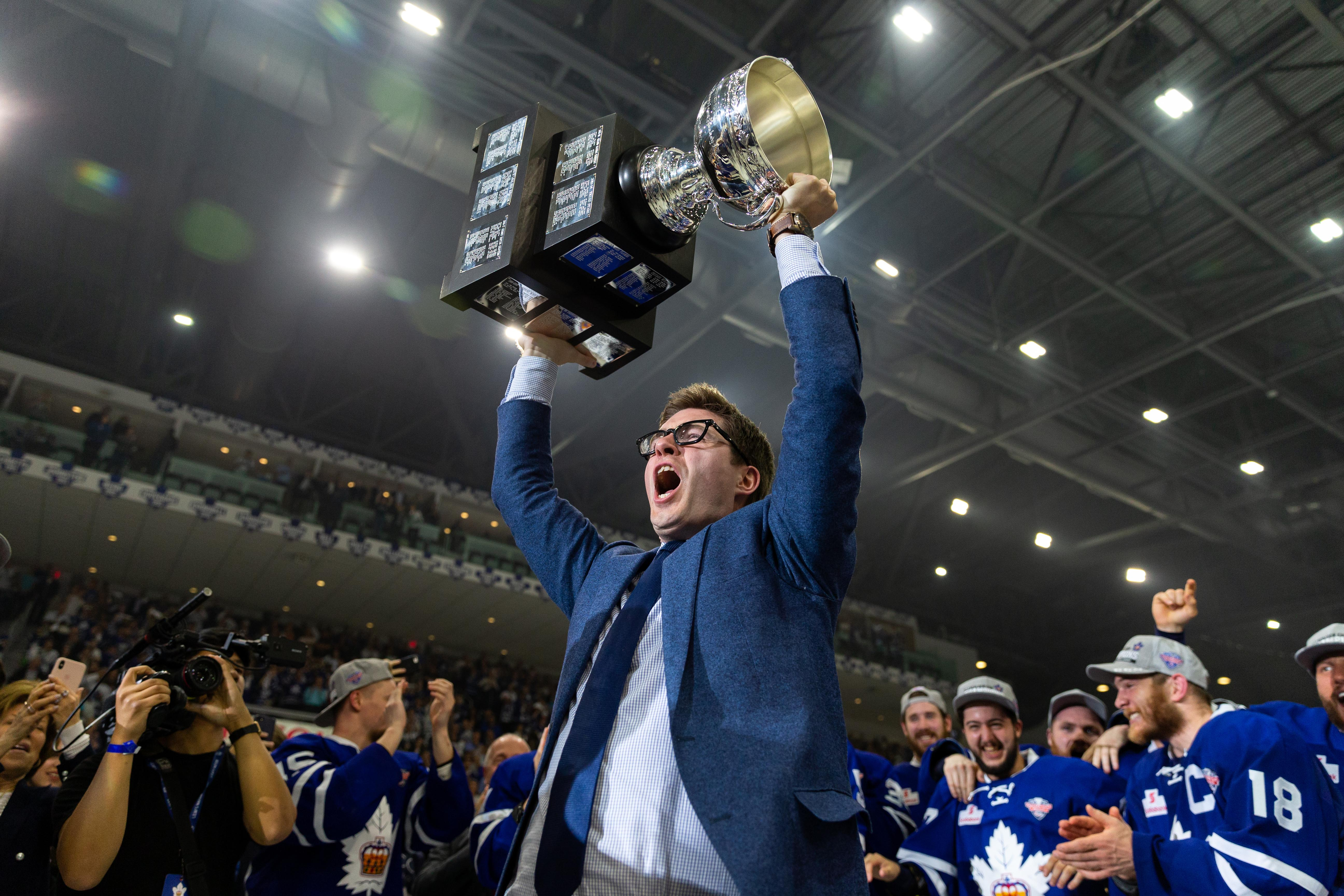
Dubas after the Toronto Marlies won the 2018 Calder Cup Final

After Shanahan hired Lou Lamoriello to serve as the team's general manager, Dubas and Hunter both took roles as assistant general managers. During his time as assistant general manager for the Maple Leafs, Dubas also served as general manager of the Toronto Marlies, the Maple Leafs' American Hockey League (AHL) affiliate team. He was instrumental in organizing a system that developed players for the Maple Leafs team, while also being competitive in their own league. Dubas hired former Greyhounds head coach Keefe to oversee the Marlies' development. In 2018, the Marlies captured the Calder Cup as the AHL champions.

After the 2017–18 season, Shanahan decided not to renew Lamoriello's contract as general manager, sticking to his original plan to have a fixed term on his time in the position before he transitioned into an advisory role. Dubas and his co-assistant general manager Hunter were considered top candidates for the position. On May 11, 2018, Dubas was named as the 17th general manager in the club's history. Shortly after Dubas was named general manager, both Hunter and Lamoriello left the organization. One of Dubas' first tasks in the new position was the 2018 NHL entry draft. He traded the team's first-round selection at 25th overall to the St. Louis Blues in exchange for their pick at 29th overall and an additional draft pick at 76th overall. The Maple Leafs drafted Swedish defenceman Rasmus Sandin who played in the OHL for the Sault Ste. Marie Greyhounds, Dubas' former team.

In his first season as general manager, the Maple Leafs fell to the Boston Bruins in the first round, losing in seven games. During the season, Dubas and the team engaged in a well-publicized contract dispute with restricted free agent forward William Nylander, which lasted two months into the season. Nylander and the team eventually agreed to a six-year contract, just minutes before the deadline for teams to reach agreements with restricted free agents. He also re-signed star centre Auston Matthews to a five-year contract extension.

Notable moves in the 2019–20 season, his second in the position, included trading Nazem Kadri to the Colorado Avalanche in exchange for Tyson Barrie and Alexander Kerfoot, clearing Nikita Zaitsev's and Patrick Marleau's contracts in separate deals, and re-signing Mitch Marner to a six-year contract after another contract dispute which lasted through the summer and into the opening day of training camp. He also fired head coach Mike Babcock after a poor start to the season, promoting Marlies head coach Keefe, who he had previously worked with on the Greyhounds and Marlies, to replace Babcock. However, during his second season, the team fell in the qualifying round at the hands of the Columbus Blue Jackets and failed to make the playoffs.

Off the ice, Dubas hired Hayley Wickenheiser to serve as assistant director of player development. When hiring scouts, Dubas introduced a system of blinded reviews, where scouting reports by potential hires were submitted anonymously, to remove bias from the process. One of the highest scorers during this stage was Noelle Needham, who was hired as an amateur scout to cover the Midwest region of the United States. Dubas has expressed a belief that increasing the diversity of the Maple Leafs staff will result in improved performance, saying "Research shows the more diverse your organization, the better your decision-making and the better your operation in general. If you're only hiring white males – and I'm saying that as a white male – you're probably leaving a lot of good people, in terms of where your organization can go and how it can think and how it can evolve and develop." During the 2018–19 season, Dubas received praise for the way he handled allegations that defenceman Morgan Rielly used a homophobic slur during a game. Rielly was cleared the following day after an investigation by the NHL. At a press conference, the following day, Dubas said "It's incumbent on us in management to build an environment if someone were gay, or were questioning their sexual orientation, that they don't feel that they have to come in here and be somebody that they're not."

In December 2019, when Ilya Mikheyev suffered a laceration on his wrist and was removed from an away game with the New Jersey Devils and had to undergo surgery at University Hospital in Newark, Dubas and assistant athletic trainer Jon Geller cleared their schedules so Mikheyev would have familiar people around in the three days between his surgery and flying back to Toronto.

With his contract expiring, Dubas departed the Maple Leafs after the team's elimination from the 2023 Stanley Cup playoffs.

==== Pittsburgh Penguins ====
Dubas was hired as president of hockey operations for the Pittsburgh Penguins on June 1, 2023, replacing Brian Burke, and subsequently assuming the role of interim general manager. Dubas then promoted himself to permanent general manager on August 3, officially replacing Ron Hextall.

On April 10, 2025, he was named general manager of the Canada men's national team for the 2025 World Championship.

=== Management style ===
During his time with the Greyhounds in the OHL, Dubas believed that data could provide a way for smaller teams to close the gap with the league's traditional powerhouse programs. Initially his analytics with the Greyhounds focused on how much time the team spent controlling the puck, which was largely done using manual review of video at the time. Dubas has been particularly focused on using data and analytics to combat bias in decision making. At the 2015 MIT Sloan Sports Analytics Conference, his presentation was entitled "How Analytics has Limited the Impact of Cognitive Bias on Personnel Decisions."

== Personal life ==
Dubas grew up a fan of the Ottawa Senators. His parents divorced when he was a child; his father was a police officer and his mother works as an ambulance call-taker and dispatcher. He has four sisters. During his childhood, Dubas spent significant amounts of time with his grandparents, and would often talk about ice hockey and baseball with his grandfather. Dubas is married and has a son and daughter.

Sporting positions
Preceded by Lou Lamoriello	General manager of the Toronto Maple Leafs; 2018–2023	Succeeded by Brad Treliving
Preceded by Ron Hextall	General manager of the Pittsburgh Penguins; 2023–present	Incumbent
