= List of Pittsburgh Penguins general managers =

The Pittsburgh Penguins are a franchise in the Eastern Conference of the National Hockey League (NHL). The team was founded as part of the league's expansion prior to the 1967–68 season. The franchise has had 12 general managers in its history, with Jack Riley serving two terms. Eight games in March and April 1983 went without a general manager due to Aldege "Baz" Bastien's death in a car crash, while the team had no interim named for a month and a half during the summer of 2023.

== Key ==
#	Number of general managers
W	Wins
L	Loses
T	Ties
W – L %	Win – Loss percentage
*	Elected to the Hockey Hall of Fame
*	Spent entire NHL career as Penguins General Manager

^{†}	Interim

== General Managers ==
#	Name	Tenure	Games	Record (W–L–T / OTL)	Points	Win percentage
1	Jack Riley	June 6, 1967 – May 1, 1970	226	73–117–36	182	.403
2	Red Kelly	May 1, 1970 – January 29, 1972	126	33–64–29	95	.377
—	Jack Riley	January 29, 1972 – January 13, 1974	149	57–73–19	133	.446
3	Jack Button	January 13, 1974 – July 1, 1975	117	54–44–19	127	.543
4	Wren Blair	July 1, 1975 – December 3, 1976	105	44–44–17	105	.500
5	Baz Bastien	December 3, 1976 – March 15, 1983	527	193–248–86	472	.447
—	—	March 16, 1983 – April 3, 1983	8	2–5–1	5	.313
6	Eddie Johnston	May 27, 1983 – April 14, 1988	400	140–220–40	320	.400
7	Tony Esposito	April 14, 1988 – December 5, 1989	106	50–47–9	109	.514
8	Craig Patrick	December 5, 1989 – May 20, 2006	1250	575–511–127–37	1314	.526
9	Ray Shero	May 20, 2006 – May 16, 2014	653	388–216–49	723	.594
—	Jason Botterill^{†}	May 16, 2014 – June 6, 2014	—	—	—	—
10	Jim Rutherford	June 6, 2014 – January 27, 2021	476	271-156-49	513	.569
—	Patrik Allvin^{†}	January 27, 2021 – February 9, 2021	4	1-3-0	2	—
11	Ron Hextall	February 9, 2021– April 14, 2023	219	123-71-25	271	.561
—	—	April 14, 2023 – June 1, 2023	—	—	—	—
12	Kyle Dubas	June 1, 2023–present				
