= Gilles Villemure =

Canadian ice hockey player (born 1940)

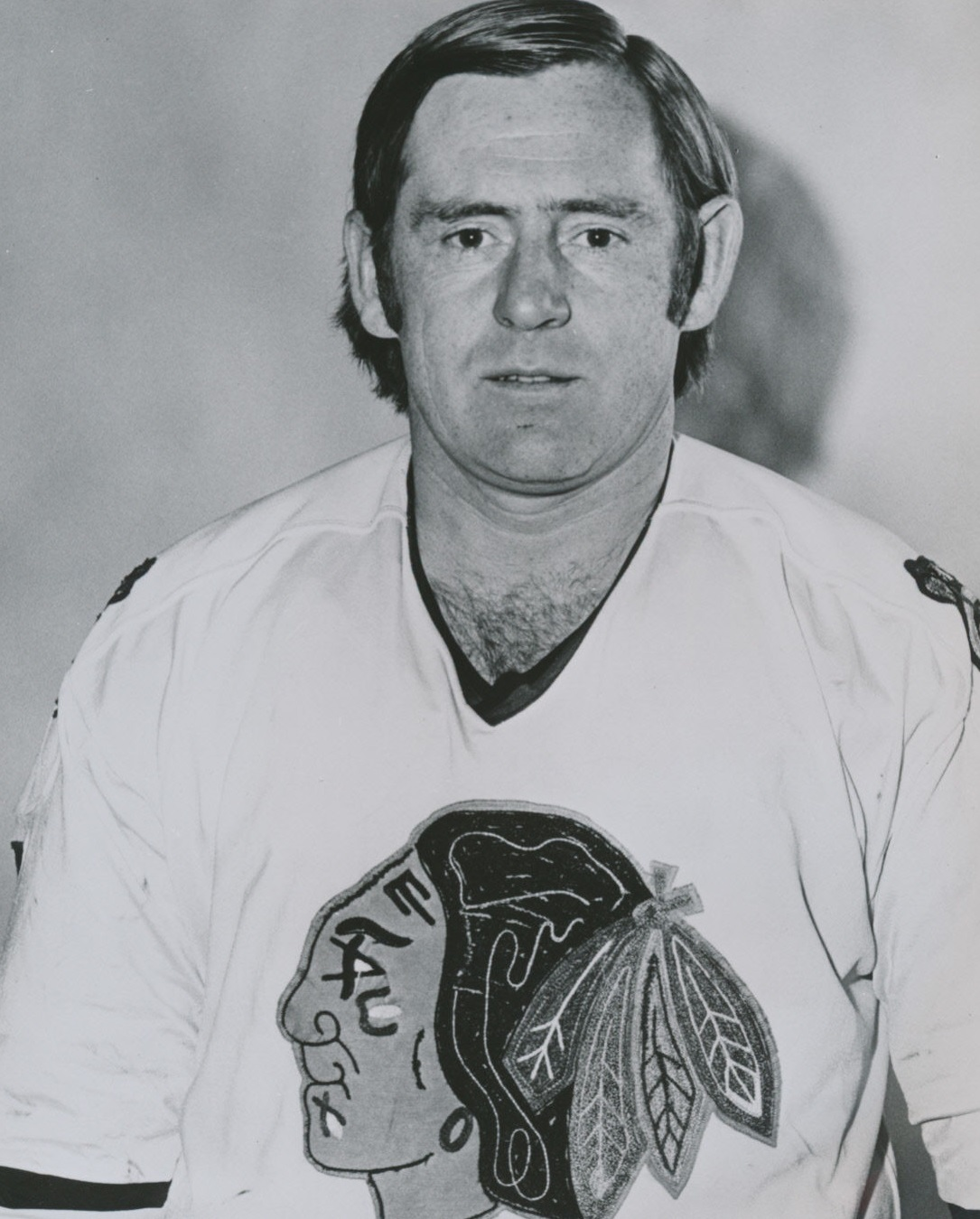
- Villemure in 1976
- Born: May 30, 1940 (age 86) Trois-Rivières, Quebec, Canada
- Height: 5 ft 8 in (173 cm)
- Weight: 185 lb (84 kg; 13 st 3 lb)
- Position: Goaltender
- Caught: Right
- Played for: New York Rangers; Chicago Black Hawks
- Playing career: 1963–1977

Joseph Hector Gilles Villemure (born May 30, 1940) is a Canadian former professional ice hockey goaltender. He played for the New York Rangers and Chicago Black Hawks in the 1960s and 1970s.

== Personal life ==
Villemure was born in Trois-Rivières, Quebec.

During the off-season, Villemure was a professional harness racehorse driver. He now resides in Levittown, New York.

== Playing career ==
Villemure played a season in the junior leagues with the Guelph Biltmores of the Ontario Hockey Association (OHA). He then spent ten years in the minor leagues, principally with the Vancouver Canucks of the Western Hockey League (WHL), the Baltimore Clippers and the Buffalo Bisons of the American Hockey League (AHL). He was a star in the minors; in each of his final two seasons in the AHL, 1968–69 and 1969–70, he won the Les Cunningham Award with the Bisons as the league's most valuable player, leading all goaltenders in the playoffs the second year to backstop the Bisons to the Calder Cup in their final season. During his minor league career, he led his league in goals against average three times and in shutouts five times. During this time he was called up on several brief occasions by the New York Rangers, with whom he had signed in 1964.

The 1970–71 season saw Villemure called to the NHL for good as the Rangers' backup to Eddie Giacomin. Over the next three seasons, Villemure recorded a sparkling 66–27–10 mark, with ten shutouts and a goals-against average never higher than 2.30, and shared the Vezina Trophy with Giacomin in 1971. He played in the NHL All-Star Game all three seasons, allowing only a single goal and recording the lowest career GAA of any All-Star Game goaltender. The Rangers were a powerhouse at that time, finishing second in the league, and reaching the Stanley Cup Finals in 1972, being the runners-up in both the regular season and playoffs to the Boston Bruins. Due to Giacomin injuring his knee in the semi-finals against the Chicago Black Hawks, Villemure played in Games Two, Five, and Six.

By the 1974–75 season, with both goaltenders aging, Villemure had become the number one goaltender in New York, but had only modest success, and was traded to the Chicago Black Hawks in the off-season. He backed up Tony Esposito and appeared in only 21 games in two years, and he retired after the 1976–77 season.

In 2009, the book 100 Ranger Greats ranked Villemure No. 48 all-time of the 901 New York Rangers who had played during the team's first 82 seasons.

== Career statistics ==
=== Regular season and playoffs ===
			Regular season									Playoffs
Season	Team	League	GP	W	L	T	MIN	GA	SO	GAA	SV%	GP	W	L	MIN	GA	SO	GAA	SV%
1958–59	Trois-Rivières Reds	QJHL	—	—	—	—	—	—	—	—	—	—	—	—	—	—	—	—	—
1958–59	Troy Bruins	IHL	3	1	2	0	180	18	0	6.00	—	—	—	—	—	—	—	—	—
1959–60	Guelph Biltmores	OHA	35	—	—	—	1980	128	1	3.66	—	5	—	—	300	19	1	3.80	—
1960–61	New York Rovers	EHL	51	16	34	1	3060	223	1	4.37	—	—	—	—	—	—	—	—	—
1961–62	Long Island Ducks	EHL	65	25	39	1	3900	242	3	3.72	—	—	—	—	—	—	—	—	—
1961–62	Charlotte Checkers	EHL	1	0	1	0	60	7	0	7.00	—	—	—	—	—	—	—	—	—
1961–62	Johnstown Jets	EHL	1	1	0	0	60	2	0	2.00	—	—	—	—	—	—	—	—	—
1962–63	Vancouver Canucks	WHL	70	35	31	4	4200	228	5	3.26	—	7	3	4	429	27	1	3.78	—
1963–64	Baltimore Clippers	AHL	66	31	33	2	3960	192	3	2.91	—	—	—	—	—	—	—	—	—
1963–64	New York Rangers	NHL	5	0	2	3	300	18	0	3.60	.899	—	—	—	—	—	—	—	—
1964–65	Vancouver Canucks	WHL	60	27	26	6	3676	212	2	3.46	—	5	1	4	309	17	0	3.30	—
1965–66	Vancouver Canucks	WHL	69	32	34	3	4178	223	5	3.20	—	7	3	4	420	27	0	3.86	—
1966–67	Baltimore Clippers	AHL	70	34	27	9	4180	238	4	3.42	—	9	4	5	569	39	0	4.11	—
1967–68	New York Rangers	NHL	4	1	2	0	200	8	1	2.40	.934	—	—	—	—	—	—	—	—
1967–68	Buffalo Bisons	AHL	37	18	13	6	2160	89	3	2.47	—	5	1	3	247	15	0	3.64	—
1968–69	New York Rangers	NHL	4	2	1	1	240	9	0	2.25	.921	1	0	1	60	4	0	4.00	.882
1968–69	Buffalo Bisons	AHL	62	36	12	14	3674	148	6	2.42	—	6	2	4	360	19	1	3.17	—
1969–70	Buffalo Bisons	AHL	65	—	—	—	3714	156	8	2.52	—	14	11	3	875	31	1	2.13	—
1970–71	New York Rangers	NHL	34	22	8	4	2039	78	4	2.30	.919	2	0	1	80	6	0	4.50	.829
1971–72	New York Rangers	NHL	37	24	7	4	2129	74	3	2.09	.913	6	4	2	360	14	0	2.33	.919
1972–73	New York Rangers	NHL	34	20	12	2	2040	78	3	2.29	.910	2	0	1	61	2	0	1.67	.935
1973–74	New York Rangers	NHL	21	7	7	3	1054	62	0	3.53	.880	1	0	0	1	0	0	0.00	1.000
1974–75	New York Rangers	NHL	45	22	14	6	2470	130	2	3.16	.888	2	1	0	94	6	0	3.83	.854
1975–76	Chicago Black Hawks	NHL	15	2	7	5	797	57	0	4.29	.859	—	—	—	—	—	—	—	—
1976–77	Chicago Black Hawks	NHL	6	0	4	1	312	28	0	5.38	.843	—	—	—	—	—	—	—	—
NHL totals			205	100	64	29	11,581	542	13	2.81	.899	14	5	5	656	32	0	2.93	.898

"Villemure's stats". The Goaltender Home Page.

== Awards and honors ==
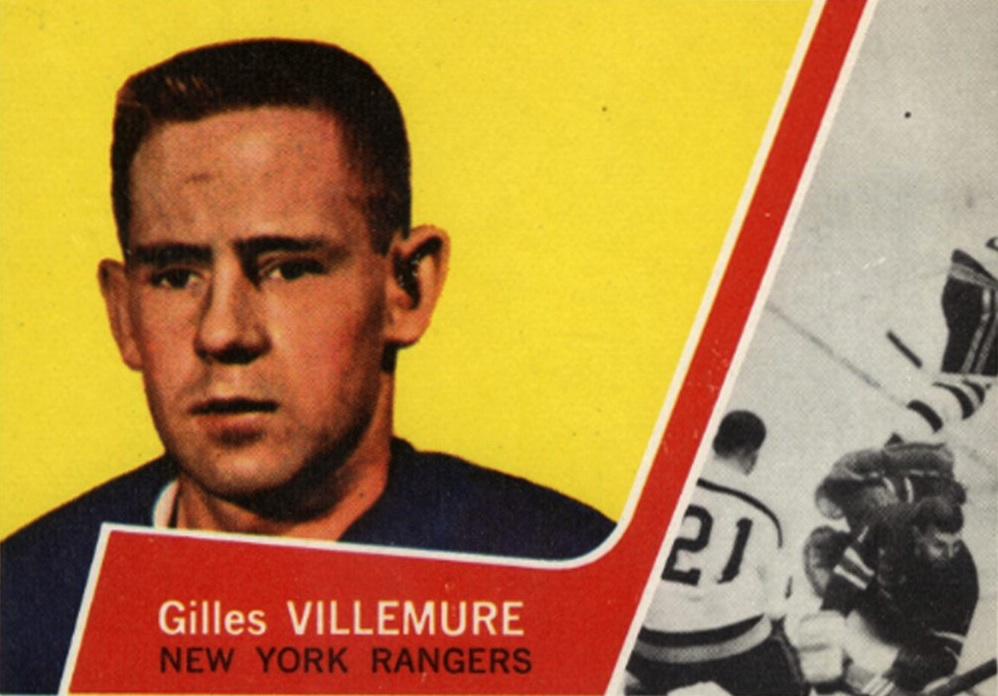
Villemure 1963 trading card

- Rookie of the Year in the WHL in 1963.
- Named to the WHL's First All-Star Team in 1966.
- Named to the AHL's Second All-Star Team in 1967.
- Won the Hap Holmes Memorial Award in 1969 and 1970.
- Won the Les Cunningham Award in 1969 and 1970.
- Named to the AHL First All-Star Team in 1969 and 1970.
- Calder Cup championship in 1970.
- Vezina Trophy winner in 1971 (shared with Eddie Giacomin).
- Named to play in the NHL All-Star Game in 1971, 1972 and 1973.

Preceded by Tony Esposito	Winner of the Vezina Trophy with Eddie Giacomin; 1971	Succeeded by Tony Esposito and Gary Smith
