= Wren Blair =

Canadian ice hockey coach, scout, and executive (1925-2013)

- Born: Wren Alvin Blair; October 2, 1925; Lindsay, Ontario, Canada
- Died: January 2, 2013 (aged 87); Oshawa, Ontario, Canada

Wren Alvin Blair (October 2, 1925 – January 2, 2013) was a Canadian ice hockey coach, scout and executive in the National Hockey League.

== Biography ==
=== Early life ===
Blair was born in Lindsay, Ontario, the son of Audrey and Alvin Blair. The family moved to Oshawa when his father took a job in a dairy. Wren grew up playing hockey on the rink outside Westmount Public School. He was given the nickname "The Bird" and was known for his wild behavior on the bench. This behavior often involved climbing on boards to profanely berate officials and his players.

Blair was founder, coach and General Manager of the Whitby Dunlops, who would win the Allan Cup in 1957 and 1959. In 1959 the team represented Canada in 1958 World Ice Hockey Championships winning the tournament. From 1958 to 1971, Blair served as the General Manager of the Clinton Comets of the Eastern Hockey League.

From 1963 to 1965, Blair was general manager of the Minneapolis Bruins, of the Central Hockey League, before his jump to the NHL.

=== Bobby Orr ===
In 1960, Blair began negotiations with Boston Bruins president Weston Adams to begin building the new Oshawa Generals, a junior ice hockey team in the Ontario Hockey League. The agreement was made contingent on a new arena being built in Oshawa, Ontario. The Oshawa Civic Auditorium would later open in 1964. The Oshawa Generals were reactivated 1962 as a team playing in the Metro Junior A League. For this year, the team played its home games at Maple Leaf Gardens.

In the fall of 1962, while serving as a scout for the Bruins, he signed Bobby Orr, then a 14-year-old phenom, to the Bruins-sponsored Oshawa Generals. Orr would later score 94 points in 47 games, helping the Generals win the Ontario Hockey Association championship in 1966 before beginning his hall of fame career in the NHL. Blair also coached the Kingston Frontenacs to the final EPHL championship in the 1962–63 season.

=== Minnesota North Stars ===
In 1967, Minnesota was awarded an expansion franchise in the NHL, Minnesota North Stars. Walter Bush, a former partner in the Minneapolis Bruins, became the North Stars' president. He then hired Blair as their first coach and general manager. In a six-team division composed of expansion teams, the Stars finished among the top four for a playoff slot. They beat the Los Angeles Kings in the Quarterfinals before losing in seven games to the St. Louis Blues in the Semifinals. He also coached parts of the 1968–69 and 1969–70 seasons before stepping down to concentrate on his role as general manager, a job he held through the 1973–74 season. He was fired as GM and replaced by the North Stars' coach, Jack Gordon in 1974. Just before his death, Blair disclosed his belief that North Stars center Bill Masterton, the first and only player to die as a result of injuries sustained on the ice on January 13, 1968, had a pre-existing cerebral brain hemorrhage prior to the hit on the ice that was generally associated with his death.

=== Pittsburgh Penguins ===
He would later go on to own the Saginaw Gears of the International Hockey League, which won two Turner Cups. In 1973 Blair, Al Savill and Otto Frenzel purchased the then-bankrupt Pittsburgh Penguins for $3.8 million. In order to trim the Penguins' payroll, Blair sold minor-league contracts to the Gears. He was also the General Manager of the Pittsburgh Penguins from July 1975 to December 1976.

=== Later life ===
From 1979 through 1985, Blair, served as the player personnel director for the Los Angeles Kings. In 2002, Wren brought the North Bay Centennials of the Ontario Hockey League to Saginaw, Michigan. The franchise was renamed the Saginaw Spirit, with Blair stayed on as a consultant for the team. He died on January 2, 2013, aged 87, in Oshawa, Ontario.

== Coaching record ==
| Team | Year | Regular season | | | | | | Post season |
| Team | Year | G | W | L | T | Pts | Finish | Result |
|---|---|---|---|---|---|---|---|---|
| Minnesota North Stars | 1967–68 | 74 | 27 | 32 | 15 | 69 | 4th in West | Lost in semi-finals |
| Minnesota North Stars | 1968–69 | 41 | 12 | 20 | 9 | 33 | 6th in West | Moved to GM role |
| Minnesota North Stars | 1969–70 | 32 | 9 | 13 | 10 | 28 | 3rd in West | Returned to GM role |
| Total | | 147 | 48 | 65 | 34 | | | |

| Preceded by Position created | General Manager of the Minnesota North Stars; 1967–74 | Succeeded by Jack Gordon |
| Preceded by Position created John Muckler | Head coach of the Minnesota North Stars; 1967–68; 1968–70 | Succeeded by John Muckler; Charlie Burns |
| Preceded by Jack Button | General Manager of the Pittsburgh Penguins; 1975–76 | Succeeded by Baz Bastien |
