= Baz Bastien =

- Born: August 29, 1919 Timmins, Ontario, Canada
- Died: March 15, 1983 (aged 63) Pittsburgh, Pennsylvania, U.S.
- Height: 5 ft 7 in (170 cm)
- Weight: 160 lb (73 kg; 11 st 6 lb)
- Position: Goaltender
- Caught: Left
- Played for: Toronto Maple Leafs; Pittsburgh Hornets
- Playing career: 1939–1949

Joseph Aldège Albert "Baz" Bastien (August 29, 1919 – March 15, 1983) was a Canadian professional ice hockey goaltender, head coach, and general manager. He played five games for the Toronto Maple Leafs of the National Hockey League in 1945 but spent most of his playing career with the Pittsburgh Hornets of the American Hockey League. He later became the Hornets' head coach and general manager and served in several front-office positions with National Hockey League clubs, most notably as general manager of the Pittsburgh Penguins from 1976 until he died in a car crash in 1983.

== Playing career ==
Bastien began his playing career in 1939 with the Port Colborne Sailors of the Ontario Hockey Association Senior A League. He was sponsored by the Maple Leafs and in 1940 began playing for their team in the Senior A League: the Toronto Marlboros. He led the Marlboros to the league championship in his first season with the club. After two years with the Marlboros, he joined the Cornwall Flyers of the Quebec Senior Hockey League.

His playing career was interrupted by a two-year stint of military service with the Canadian Army. He resumed his career in 1945, beginning the season with the Maple Leafs. He was unable to secure a permanent spot on the Leafs' roster after Turk Broda returned from his military service.

Bastien was sent by the Maple Leafs to the Pittsburgh Hornets, their top professional affiliate, where he spent the better part of four seasons. He was named to the league's First All-Star team in 1947, 1948, and 1949 and also won the Hap Holmes Memorial Award for fewest goals against in 1948 and 1949.

Personal tragedy befell Bastien on September 19, 1949, at the Hornets' training camp in Welland, Ontario. On the third or fourth shot he faced that day the puck struck his right eye. The damage was so severe that it needed to be removed. Bastien's playing career was over, and he wore a glass eye for the rest of his life.

== Front office ==
Bastien remained with the Hornets in an administrative capacity and was named their new head coach during the 1949–50 season. The following season, he was named general manager, lasting one season before being replaced. He returned to the Hornets as head coach in 1953, again for a single season. When the Hornets returned to Pittsburgh after a five-year absence, due to the destruction of Duquesne Gardens and construction of the Pittsburgh Civic Arena, Bastien returned with them, again as head coach. He moved to the general manager's position again in 1962 and remained in that capacity until the Hornets folded in 1967. He returned behind the bench in 1966, coaching them to a Calder Cup win in their final season.

He joined the Detroit Red Wings as assistant general manager to former Hornet Sid Abel, and followed Abel to the Kansas City Scouts, in the same capacity, in 1974.

Bastien returned to Pittsburgh in 1976, replacing Wren Blair as general manager of the Pittsburgh Penguins. His first trade for the Penguins, on September 20, 1977, brought Brian Spencer from the Buffalo Sabres in exchange for Ron Schock. On several occasions, he traded some of the Penguins' stars to maintain the team's payroll. In November 1977, Bastien traded All-Star MVP Syl Apps, Jr. to the Los Angeles Kings in exchange for Dave Schultz. Later in that month, he sent superstar Pierre Larouche to the Montreal Canadiens for Pete Mahovlich and Peter Lee. He also faced criticism for trading Pittsburgh's first-round draft picks in 1977, 1978 and 1979.

== Death ==
Bastien attended a dinner by the Professional Hockey Writer's Association (PHWA) on March 14, 1983. Later that night while driving home, he collided with a motorcycle on Interstate 376 in suburban Green Tree, Pennsylvania at 12:15 AM, March 15, 1983. He was pronounced dead at Mercy Hospital from a fractured skull in the collision and a heart attack sustained afterward. He was 63. Penguins coach Eddie Johnston was named his replacement on May 27, 1983.

Two awards were created the following season to honor Bastien. The American Hockey League began awarding the Aldege "Baz" Bastien Memorial Award annually to the best goaltender in the league, and the Pittsburgh chapter of the PHWA awarded the Aldege "Baz" Bastien Memorial Good Guy Award to the Penguin judged to be most cooperative with the media.

== Career statistics ==
=== Regular season and playoffs ===
			Regular season								Playoffs
Season	Team	League	GP	W	L	T	Min	GA	SO	GAA	GP	W	L	Min	GA	SO	GAA
1938–39	North Bay Trappers	NOHA	—	—	—	—	—	—	—	—	—	—	—	—	—	—	—
1938–39	North Bay Trappers	M-Cup	—	—	—	—	—	—	—	—	2	0	2	140	12	0	5.14
1939–40	Port Colborne Sailors	OHA Sr	17	—	—	—	1020	47	2	2.76	4	1	3	240	23	0	5.75
1939–40	Atlantic City Seagulls	EHL	2	—	—	—	90	4	0	2.67	2	1	1	120	9	0	4.50
1940–41	Toronto Marlboros	OHA Sr	15	—	—	—	880	35	1	2.39	16	11	7	1090	36	2	1.98
1940–41	Toronto Marlboros	Al-Cup	—	—	—	—	—	—	—	—	9	3	4	370	17	1	2.76
1941–42	Toronto Marlboros	OHA Sr	30	14	12	4	1800	75	1	2.50	6	2	4	360	18	0	3.00
1942–43	Cornwall Flyers	QSHL	30	—	—	—	1760	97	4	3.31	6	2	4	360	22	0	3.61
1945–46	Toronto Maple Leafs	NHL	5	0	4	1	300	20	0	4.00	—	—	—	—	—	—	—
1945–46	Pittsburgh Hornets	AHL	38	16	15	7	2280	144	1	3.79	6	3	3	385	20	0	3.12
1946–47	Pittsburgh Hornets	AHL	40	23	22	5	2400	104	7	2.60	12	7	5	720	29	1	2.42
1946–47	Hollywood Wolves	PCHL	22	—	—	—	1320	33	5	1.50	—	—	—	—	—	—	—
1947–48	Pittsburgh Hornets	AHL	68	38	18	12	4080	170	5	2.50	2	0	2	130	6	0	2.77
1948–49	Pittsburgh Hornets	AHL	68	39	19	10	4080	175	6	2.57	—	—	—	—	—	—	—
AHL totals			214	116	74	34	12,840	593	19	2.77	20	10	10	1235	55	1	2.67
NHL totals			5	0	4	1	300	20	0	4.00	—	—	—	—	—	—	—

Preceded by Wren Blair	General Manager of the Pittsburgh Penguins; 1976–83	Succeeded by Eddie Johnston
