= Eddie Giacomin =

Canadian ice hockey player (1939–2025)

- Hockey Hall of Fame, 1987
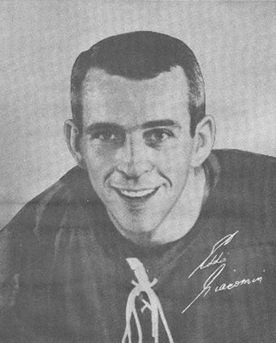
- Giacomin with the New York Rangers in 1968
- Born: June 6, 1939 Sudbury, Ontario, Canada
- Died: September 14, 2025 (aged 86) Birmingham, Michigan, U.S.
- Height: 5 ft 11 in (180 cm)
- Weight: 180 lb (82 kg; 12 st 12 lb)
- Position: Goaltender
- Caught: Left
- Played for: New York Rangers; Detroit Red Wings
- Playing career: 1959–1978

Edward Giacomin (June 6, 1939 – September 14, 2025) was a Canadian professional ice hockey goaltender who played for the New York Rangers and Detroit Red Wings of the National Hockey League (NHL) between 1965 and 1978.

== Playing career ==
Giacomin began his professional career in 1959 when he played four games for the Washington Presidents of the Eastern Hockey League. The Eagles had originally sought his brother Rollie, but work commitments meant he was unable to play, so suggested Eddie instead. Giacomin followed that with brief stints with the Clinton Comets in 1958–59 and 1959–60. Despite suffering serious burns in a kitchen accident, Giacomin made the roster of the Providence Reds in the 1960–61 season. In the Original Six days of the 1960s, with only six starting goaltending jobs in the NHL, positions were hard to obtain, and Giacomin starred for the Reds for five full seasons.

NHL teams, particularly the Detroit Red Wings and the New York Rangers, began to express interest in Giacomin. New York traded three players and starting goaltender Marcel Paille to the Reds for Giacomin in 1965. He was impressive in his first month with the Rangers but faltered thereafter, and lost the starting job. The following season he improved markedly; he led the NHL in shutouts and backstopped the Rangers to their second playoff berth in nine seasons.

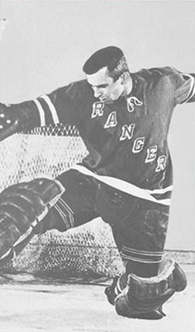
Giacomin with the Rangers in the 1960s

A classic stand-up goaltender and a skilled stick handler known for leaving the crease to play the puck, Giacomin was the Rangers' starting goaltender for the next nine seasons. He led the league in games played for four straight years from 1967 to 1970 and in shutouts in 1967, 1968 and 1971. He was named to the NHL All-Star Team five times including two at First Team.

In 1971, he shared the Vezina Trophy with teammate Gilles Villemure, with whom he formed an effective goaltender tandem. Typical of Giacomin's competitive nature, during the semi-finals of the Stanley Cup playoffs against the Chicago Black Hawks, when Bobby Hull skated over the back of his hand, Giacomin continued to play, and when the Rangers won the game, even the Black Hawks used the word "guts" to describe his determination. The Rangers lost the series in seven games.

Giacomin proved a tough opponent for the Montreal Canadiens, saying “The nice thing was, they could embarrass you on Saturday night in Montreal then you could shut them out the next night back in New York, having taken the same train to our rink. I remember (Canadiens’) Boom-Boom Geoffrion coming to our car, B.S.-ing, and the next night we’d have to kick the (stuffing) out of them.” During the first round of the 1972 Stanley Cup playoffs, Giacomin's Rangers drew the Canadiens who were the defending Cup champions. Giacomin made what he called the "best save of his career on Frank Mahovlich late in New York’s 3-2 Game 6 win -- a lunging, seemingly impossible cross-crease stop". Giacomin flopped around at the final siren like a fish out of water, “doing a modern-day dance,” as he was “so excited that we beat Montreal because you didn’t get a chance to do that very often”. In a rematch of the previous year's playoff semi-finals, the Rangers swept the Chicago Black Hawks, but Giacomin injured his knee. The Rangers met the Boston Bruins in the 1972 Stanley Cup Final, losing in a hard-fought six-game series, with Giacomin losing Games One and Four and winning Game Three.

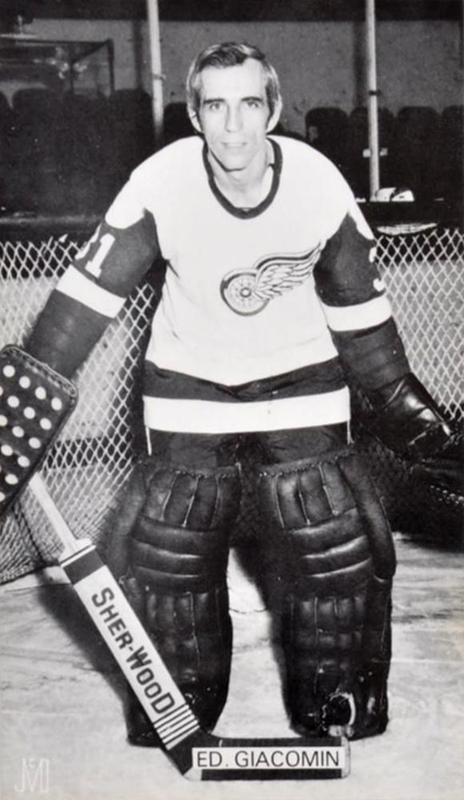
Giacomin with the Detroit Red Wings c. 1976

Giacomin's effectiveness was reduced in 1975 by injuries. The following season, the Rangers got off to their worst start in ten years (they would miss the playoffs for the first time in a decade) and general manager Emile Francis began to get rid of their high-salaried veterans, Giacomin among them. Many fans were angry when he was put on waivers and claimed by the Detroit Red Wings on October 29, 1975, as the result of a youth movement culminating in John Davidson taking over in goal. The Red Wings' next game was in New York on November 2, and when Giacomin appeared on the ice in a Red Wing jersey, fans gave him a long-standing ovation and cheered for him throughout the game. Rangers fans booed their own team when they took shots or scored on Giacomin, and chanted Giacomin's name throughout the match, which he won for the Red Wings. The evening was voted one of the 50 greatest moments in MSG history.

Giacomin played three respectable seasons for Detroit before a youth movement took hold there as well. During this time, Giacomin helped hockey writer and sports journalist Hugh Delano write a biography about his life and career titled `Eddie, A Goalie's Story' (Atheneum, 1976). He retired on January 17, 1978, with a career record of 289-208-97 and a 2.82 GAA.

== Retirement and death ==
Giacomin spent the 1978-79 NHL season as a broadcaster for the New York Islanders, who were beaten in the 1979 Stanley Cup playoffs by the rival Rangers that spring. Giacomin later served with the Islanders and the Red Wings as an assistant coach and two stints with the Rangers as a goaltending coach.

He was inducted into the Hockey Hall of Fame in 1987. His jersey number 1 was the second number retired by the Rangers, on March 15, 1989, joining Rod Gilbert's number 7 that had been retired on October 14, 1979.

Giacomin died at his home in Birmingham, Michigan, on the evening of September 14, 2025, at the age of 86.

== Achievements and facts ==
- Named to the NHL First All-Star Team in 1967 and 1971.
- Named to the NHL Second All-Star Team in 1968, 1969 and 1970
- Played in NHL All-Star Game in 1967, 1968, 1969, 1970, 1971 and 1973
- Vezina Trophy winner in 1971 (shared with Gilles Villemure)
- Ranked 25th in career wins by a goaltender with 289
- Ranked 19th in career shutouts with 54
- His No. 1 was the second jersey number retired by the New York Rangers on March 15, 1989
- In the 2009 book 100 Ranger Greats, was ranked No. 6 all-time of the 901 New York Rangers (and ranked second highest of the 74 who were goaltenders) who had played during the team's first 82 seasons
- Inducted into the Hockey Hall of Fame in 1987

== Career statistics ==
=== Regular season and playoffs ===
Bold indicates led league

			Regular season									Playoffs
Season	Team	League	GP	W	L	T	MIN	GA	SO	GAA	SV%	GP	W	L	MIN	GA	SO	GAA	SV%
1957–58	Commack Comets	NBHL	—	—	—	—	—	—	—	—	—	—	—	—	—	—	—	—	—
1958–59	Sudbury Bell Telephone	NBHL	—	—	—	—	—	—	—	—	—	—	—	—	—	—	—	—	—
1958–59	Washington Presidents	EHL	4	4	0	0	240	13	0	3.25	—	—	—	—	—	—	—	—	—
1959–60	Clinton Comets	EHL	8	—	—	—	—	—	—	3.28	—	—	—	—	—	—	—	—	—
1959–60	New York Rovers	EHL	32	—	—	—	—	—	—	4.31	—	—	—	—	—	—	—	—	—
1959–60	Montréal Royals	EPHL	1	—	—	—	—	—	—	—	—	—	—	—	—	—	—	—	—
1959–60	Providence Reds	AHL	1	1	0	0	60	4	0	4.00	—	—	—	—	—	—	—	—	—
1960–61	Providence Reds	AHL	43	17	24	0	2,510	183	0	4.37	—	—	—	—	—	—	—	—	—
1960–61	New York Rovers	EHL	12	2	10	0	720	54	0	4.50	—	—	—	—	—	—	—	—	—
1961–62	Providence Reds	AHL	40	20	19	1	2,400	144	2	3.60	—	—	—	—	—	—	—	—	—
1962–63	Providence Reds	AHL	39	22	14	2	2,340	102	4	2.62	—	6	2	4	359	31	0	5.18	—
1963–64	Providence Reds	AHL	69	30	34	5	4,140	232	6	3.37	—	3	1	2	120	12	0	6.00	—
1964–65	Providence Reds	AHL	59	19	38	2	3,527	226	0	3.84	—	—	—	—	—	—	—	—	—
1965–66	New York Rangers	NHL	35	8	20	6	2,036	125	0	3.68	.874	—	—	—	—	—	—	—	—
1965–66	Baltimore Clippers	AHL	7	3	4	0	420	21	0	3.00	—	—	—	—	—	—	—	—	—
1966–67	New York Rangers	NHL	**68**	**30**	27	**11**	**3,981**	173	**9**	2.61	.917	4	0	**4**	246	14	0	3.41	.896
1967–68	New York Rangers	NHL	**66**	**36**	20	10	**3,940**	**160**	**8**	2.44	.915	6	2	4	360	18	0	3.00	.909
1968–69	New York Rangers	NHL	**70**	**37**	23	7	**4,114**	175	7	2.55	.912	3	0	3	180	10	0	3.33	.853
1969–70	New York Rangers	NHL	**70**	35	21	14	**4,148**	163	6	2.36	.916	5	2	3	280	19	0	4.07	.858
1970–71	New York Rangers	NHL	45	27	10	7	2,641	95	**8**	2.16	.922	12	7	5	759	28	0	2.21	.913
1971–72	New York Rangers	NHL	44	24	10	9	2,551	115	1	2.70	.900	**10**	**6**	4	**600**	**27**	0	2.70	.902
1972–73	New York Rangers	NHL	43	26	11	6	2,580	125	4	2.91	.899	10	5	4	539	23	1	2.56	.903
1973–74	New York Rangers	NHL	56	30	15	10	3,286	168	5	3.07	.890	13	7	**6**	788	37	0	2.82	.895
1974–75	New York Rangers	NHL	37	13	12	8	2,069	120	1	3.48	.870	2	0	2	86	4	0	2.79	.889
1975–76	New York Rangers	NHL	4	0	3	1	240	19	0	4.75	.806	—	—	—	—	—	—	—	—
1975–76	Detroit Red Wings	NHL	29	12	14	3	1,740	100	2	3.45	.890	—	—	—	—	—	—	—	—
1976–77	Detroit Red Wings	NHL	33	8	18	3	1,791	107	3	3.58	.871	—	—	—	—	—	—	—	—
1977–78	Detroit Red Wings	NHL	9	3	5	1	516	27	0	3.14	.893	—	—	—	—	—	—	—	—
NHL totals			609	289	209	96	35,633	1,672	54	2.82	.902	65	29	35	3,838	180	1	2.81	.897

"Giacomin's stats". The Goaltender Home Page.

Awards and achievements
Preceded by Tony Esposito	Winner of the Vezina Trophy; 1971; With: Gilles Villemure	Succeeded by Tony Esposito; Gary Smith
