= Red Kelly =

Canadian ice hockey player and coach (1927–2019)

Red Kelly CM
- Hockey Hall of Fame, 1969
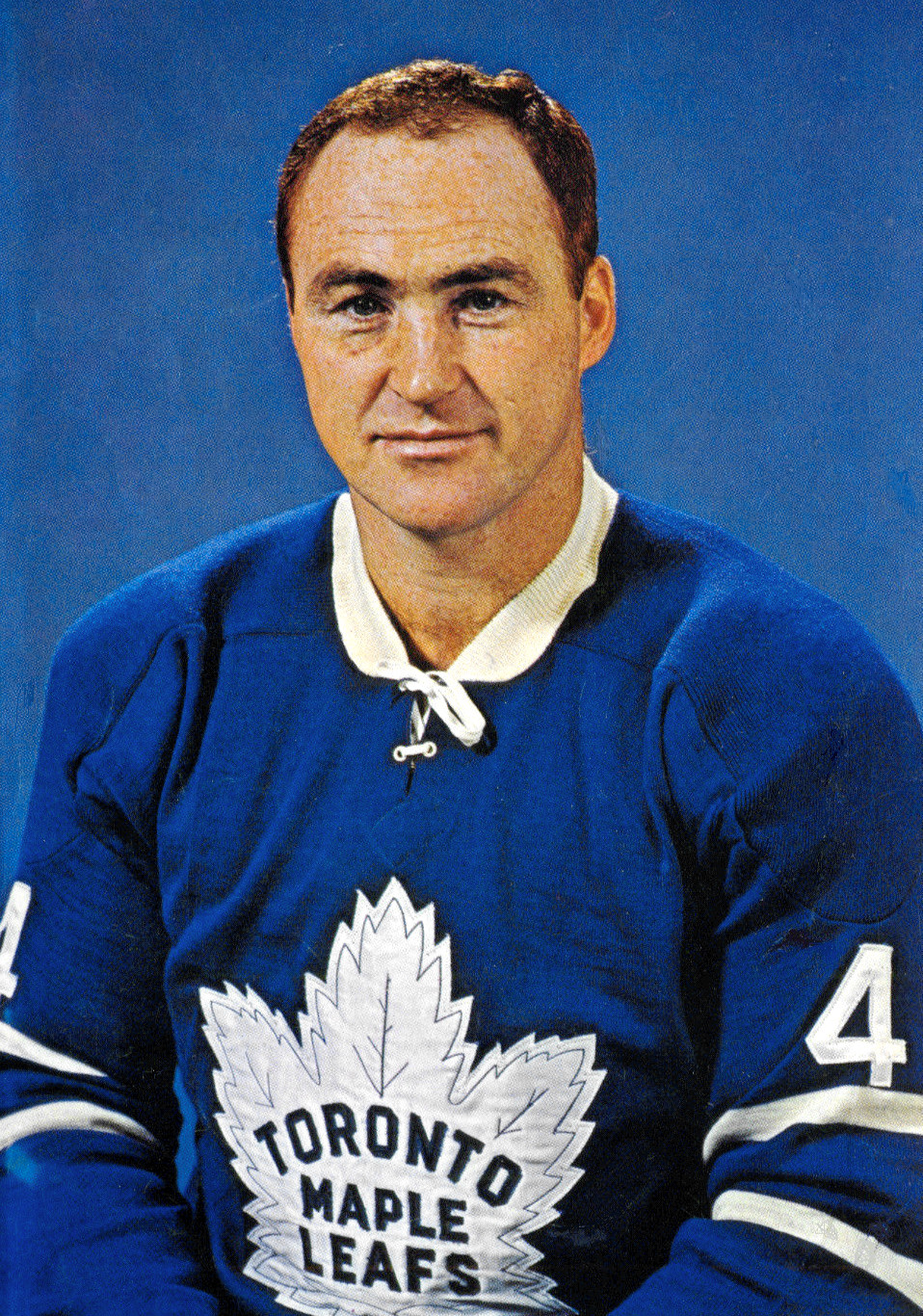
- Kelly with the Toronto Maple Leafs, c. 1963
- Born: July 9, 1927 Simcoe, Ontario, Canada
- Died: May 2, 2019 (aged 91) Toronto, Ontario, Canada
- Height: 5 ft 11 in (180 cm)
- Weight: 180 lb (82 kg; 12 st 12 lb)
- Position: Defence / Centre
- Shot: Left
- Played for: Detroit Red Wings; Toronto Maple Leafs
- Playing career: 1947–1967

Member of the Canada Parliament for York West
- In office June 18, 1962 – November 7, 1965
- Preceded by: John Hamilton
- Succeeded by: Robert Winters

Personal details
- Party: Liberal
- Spouse: Andra Carol McLaughlin (m. 1959)

Leonard Patrick "Red" Kelly CM (July 9, 1927 – May 2, 2019) was a Canadian professional hockey player and coach. Kelly won eight Stanley Cups, four each with Detroit and then Toronto. He achieved more cup victories than any other player who never played for the Montreal Canadiens. He was also one of the only two players to have never played for the Canadiens and to be part of two of the nine dynasties recognized by the National Hockey League (NHL) in its history. In 2017, Kelly was named one of the “100 Greatest NHL Players” in history.

While still playing in the NHL for the Toronto Maple Leafs, he also served as a Liberal Member of Parliament for the Toronto-area York West electoral district from 1962 to 1965. During that time, he also won two more Stanley Cups. Starting in 1967, he retired as a player to become the head coach of the expansion Los Angeles Kings. He would coach another ten years in the NHL, with a stop-over in Pittsburgh and ending with the Leafs in June 1977.

== Early life ==
Leonard Patrick "Red" Kelly was born on July 9, 1927 in Simcoe, Ontario, to farmer Lawrence Daniel and housewife Mary Frances Kelly (née Owen). Growing up in a rural area, he was known as "the red-headed kid" when he would get picked for teams based on his red hair and not by his name. That is how he got the nickname "Red" and was most commonly known publicly by that name. He initially attended high school at Simcoe Composite School before attending Toronto's St. Michael's College high school.

He grew up listening to Foster Hewitt's broadcasts of the Toronto Maple Leafs hockey games, and was particularly inspired by the style of their hard-charging defenceman, Red Horner. He continued to play hockey even after not making the Toronto bantam feeder team for the St. Michael's high school team.

His family was Catholic and in 1943, paid for him to attend St.Michael's, which was a Basilian Order Catholic school. In 1944, he made the school's top-tier junior ice hockey team. However, while playing junior hockey for the St. Michael's Majors, he was encouraged to refine his style by his coach, former Leaf great Joe Primeau. With the Majors, he won a Memorial Cup in 1947, as the best junior ice hockey team in Canada. He played with the team until he graduated in 1947.

== NHL career ==
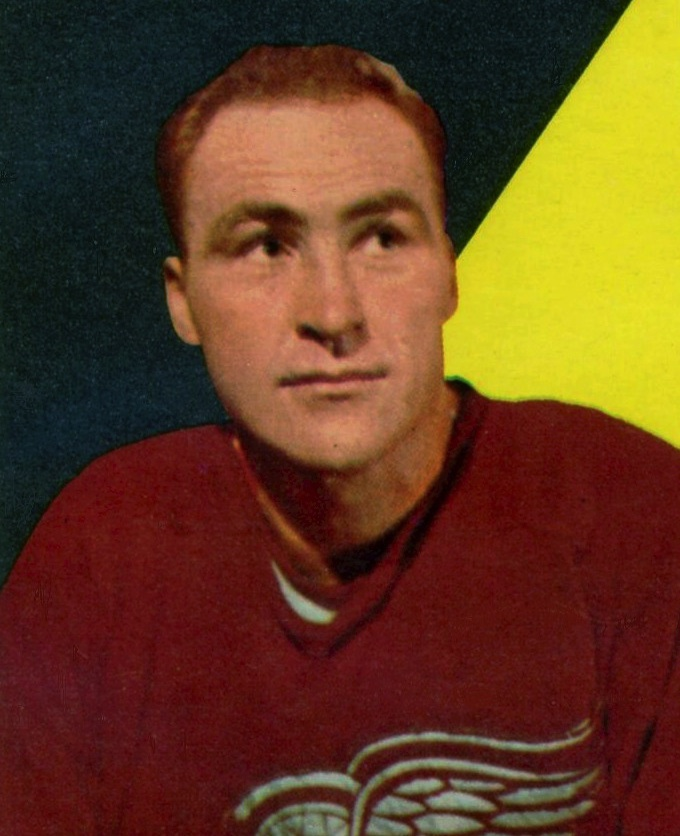
Red Kelly with the Detroit Red Wings

=== Detroit Red Wings ===
The Maple Leafs passed on Kelly after a scout predicted he would not last 20 games in the NHL (despite the Majors' long relationship with the Leafs) and the 19-year-old joined the Detroit Red Wings in 1947. In 1954 he was runner-up to Chicago's Al Rollins for the Hart Memorial Trophy. On April 29, 1954 Kelly won the inaugural James Norris Memorial Trophy as the NHL's top defenceman, getting 162 out of possible 180 votes, with Montreal's Doug Harvey coming in at distant second with 57 points. He also won the Lady Byng Trophy in 1951, 1953 and 1954 as the NHL's most gentlemanly player. In over 12 years as a Red Wing, the team won eight regular-season championships and four Stanley Cups. He was chosen as a First Team All-Star defenceman six times.

Kelly played much of the 1958–59 season with a broken ankle. However, this was a closely guarded team secret until midway through the next season, when a reporter asked Kelly why he had been off his game for much of 1959. Kelly replied, "Don't know. Might have been the ankle." When Red Wings GM Jack Adams got wind of the story, he was furious, and immediately brokered a four-player deal in which Kelly was sent to the New York Rangers. However, Kelly scuttled the deal when he announced he would retire rather than go to New York.

=== Toronto Maple Leafs ===
Maple Leafs head coach and general manager Punch Imlach stepped in and tried to talk Kelly into playing for him. Though he disliked Maple Leaf Gardens and was still smarting from the scout's assessment of him 13 years earlier, Kelly agreed to be traded to the Leafs. Once Kelly arrived in Toronto, Imlach asked him to switch positions and become a full-time centre, figuring that Kelly could easily match up against the Montreal Canadiens' Jean Béliveau. The switch proved to be a success as, already a great playmaker, Kelly turned Frank Mahovlich into one of the most lethal goal scorers in NHL history.

Kelly won his fourth Lady Byng Award in 1961. In his eight seasons with the Leafs, they won four Stanley Cups–the same number of times he had won in Detroit. In 1,316 regular season games, he scored 281 goals and 542 assists for 823 points. At the time of his retirement, Kelly was seventh all time in career points, fifth in assists, 13th in goals, and second only to Gordie Howe in games played. In 164 playoff games, he scored 33 goals and 59 assists for 92 points.

Over his 20-year playing career, he won eight Stanley Cups, four each with Detroit and Toronto. These cup victories are more than any other player who never played for the Montreal Canadiens. The Canadiens ahead of him are: Henri Richard (11), Jean Beliveau (10), Yvan Cournoyer (10), and Claude Provost (9). He was also one of the only two players to have never played for the Canadiens and to be part of two of the nine dynasties recognized by the National Hockey League (NHL) in its history. In 2017, Kelly was named one of the “100 Greatest NHL Players” in history.

== Coaching career ==
=== Los Angeles Kings ===
After the Maple Leafs won the Stanley Cup in 1967, Kelly announced his retirement as a player, and negotiated with the expansion Los Angeles Kings to be their inaugural coach on the strength of Imlach's assertion that Toronto would not stand in the way of Kelly's coaching career. Imlach insisted, however, that Los Angeles draft Kelly in the expansion draft, and after the Kings failed to do so, refused to release Kelly's rights until Los Angeles traded minor-league defenceman Ken Block to the Leafs. Kelly guided the Kings to second place in the West Division and made the playoffs two years in a row.

=== Pittsburgh Penguins ===
He left the Kings for a one-year contract to succeed Red Sullivan as coach of the Pittsburgh Penguins on July 2, 1969. After the Penguins ended the 1969–70 season with its first-ever playoff appearance and advanced to the semifinals, Kelly signed a five-year, $250,000 contract on May 21, 1970, to continue as coach, and also replaced Jack Riley as general manager. With the team struggling in sixth place in the NHL West Division during a stretch of winning only two of 22 contests and having failed to qualify for the postseason in 1970–71, Kelly was pressured to relinquish his general manager title back to Riley on January 29, 1972, in order to concentrate on his coaching duties. Amid a slump in which the Penguins won only two games with three draws and seven losses and slid into fifth place in the eight-team NHL West Division, Kelly was fired and replaced by Ken Schinkel on January 13, 1973.

=== Toronto Maple Leafs ===
Kelly returned to the Maple Leafs after signing a four-year contract to succeed John McLellan as coach on August 20, 1973. He stayed in the position from the 1973–74 season to 1976–77. The team earned a playoff berth in all four seasons with Kelly as head coach but got eliminated in the quarterfinals each time. A bizarre aspect of his tenure as Maple Leafs coach occurred during the 1975–76 quarterfinal series when he promoted pyramid power amongst his players to counter the Philadelphia Flyers' use of Kate Smith's rendition of "God Bless America." He hung a plastic model of a pyramid in the team's clubhouse after a pair of away defeats to start the series. The players embraced the superstition after observing team captain Darryl Sittler first place his hockey sticks beneath the pyramid and then stand under it for exactly four minutes. The Maple Leafs managed to win all three of its home matches before losing the series' decisive Game 7. Kelly was fired at the end of the 1976–1977 season, on June 17, 1977. That ended 30 consecutive years at ice level in the NHL as a player and coach. Kelly coached 742 regular season games during his NHL career of which his team won 278, lost 300 and tied 134. He coached 62 NHL playoff games winning 24 of these.

== Political career ==
Kelly was elected to the House of Commons of Canada in the 1962 federal election in the York West electoral district, the first Liberal party member to do so since 1935. He defeated Conservative incumbent John Hamilton, 30,762 to 27,060 votes. He was easily re-elected in the following year's election, beating his Progressive Conservative opponent, future NHL agent Alan Eagleson, by an almost 13,000 vote margin. The victory meant that he was now part of Prime Minister Lester B. Pearson's newly elected Liberal government. Kelly continued to play with the Toronto Maple Leafs during his terms as a Member of Parliament and won two more Stanley Cups in that time. During the Great Canadian Flag Debate, he received opposition from Leafs owner Conn Smythe who opposed Pearson's plans to replace the Red Ensign flag with the Maple Leaf. He did not seek re-election in 1965, but left federal politics after his two terms in the 25th and 26th Canadian Parliaments, because he wanted more time with his family. He was succeeded in York West by fellow Liberal Robert Winters.

While a member of parliament, Kelly appeared as himself on the October 29, 1962, episode of the game show To Tell the Truth. He received three of four possible votes.

== Achievements and data ==
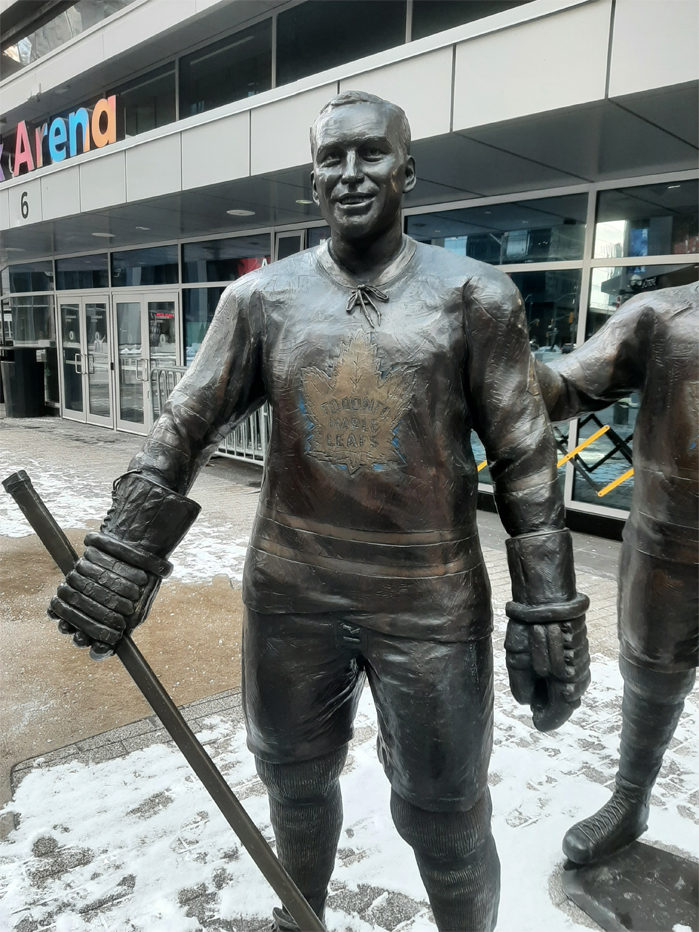
Kelly is immortalized with a statue at Legends Row in front of Scotiabank Arena

- Named a first team All-Star on defense in 1951, 1952, 1953, 1954, 1955 and 1957.
- Named a Second Team All-Star on defense in 1950 and 1956.
- Name was engraved on the Stanley Cup in 1950, 1952, 1954, 1955 (with Detroit)
- Name was engraved on the Stanley Cup in 1962, 1963, 1964, 1967 (with Toronto).
- Kelly was elected to the Hockey Hall of Fame in 1969.
- In 1998, he was ranked number 22 on The Hockey News' list of the 100 greatest hockey players.
- In 2001, he was made a Member of the Order of Canada.
- Inducted to the Ontario Sports Hall of Fame in 2001.
- Toronto Maple Leafs#4 retired on October 15, 2016
- In the fall of 2016, Kelly published his autobiography "The Red Kelly Story" by ECW Press with co-authors L. Waxy Gregoire and David M. Dupuis, both from Penetanguishene, Ontario. This book went on to win the 2016 Ontario Speaker's Book Award.
- In January 2017, Kelly was part of the first group of players to be named one of the 100 Greatest NHL Players in history.
- Detroit Red Wings#4 was retired on February 1, 2019

== Personal life ==
Kelly married fellow red-head Andra Carol McLaughlin, an American figure skating star, in 1959. They had four children. Kelly's son Leonard Patrick Kelly Jr. represented Canada in the 1992 Albertville and the 1994 Lillehammer Olympics in Long-track speed skating.

Kelly's grandson George Waddell represents GBR in ice dance with his partner Sasha Fear. Another grandson Bruce Waddell represents Canada in ice dance with his partner Natalie D'Alessandro. Kelly was the granduncle of hockey player Mark Jankowski. On May 2, 2019, Kelly died at the age of 91.

== Career statistics ==
			Regular season					Playoffs
Season	Team	League	GP	G	A	Pts	PIM	GP	G	A	Pts	PIM
1943–44	St. Michael's Midgets	Minor-ON	8	10	5	15	—	—	—	—	—	—
1944–45	St. Michael's Buzzers	Big-10 Jr. B	11	15	13	28	7	11	16	8	24	6
1944–45	St. Michael's College Majors	OHA-Jr.	1	0	0	0	0	—	—	—	—	—
1945–46	St. Michael's College Majors	OHA-Jr.	26	13	11	24	18	11	1	0	1	7
1946–47	St. Michael's College Majors	OHA-Jr.	30	8	24	32	11	9	3	3	6	9
1946–47	St. Michael's College Majors	M-Cup	—	—	—	—	—	9	5	5	10	2
1947–48	Detroit Red Wings	NHL	60	6	14	20	13	10	3	2	5	2
1948–49	Detroit Red Wings	NHL	59	5	11	16	10	11	1	1	2	6
1949–50	Detroit Red Wings	NHL	70	15	25	40	9	14	1	3	4	2
1950–51	Detroit Red Wings	NHL	70	17	37	54	24	6	0	1	1	0
1951–52	Detroit Red Wings	NHL	67	16	31	47	16	5	1	0	1	0
1952–53	Detroit Red Wings	NHL	70	19	27	46	8	6	0	4	4	0
1953–54	Detroit Red Wings	NHL	62	16	33	49	18	12	5	1	6	4
1954–55	Detroit Red Wings	NHL	70	15	30	45	28	11	2	4	6	17
1955–56	Detroit Red Wings	NHL	70	16	34	50	39	10	2	4	6	2
1956–57	Detroit Red Wings	NHL	70	10	25	35	18	5	1	0	1	0
1957–58	Detroit Red Wings	NHL	61	13	18	31	26	4	0	1	1	2
1958–59	Detroit Red Wings	NHL	67	8	13	21	34	—	—	—	—	—
1959–60	Detroit Red Wings	NHL	50	6	12	18	10	—	—	—	—	—
1959–60	Toronto Maple Leafs	NHL	18	6	5	11	8	10	3	8	11	2
1960–61	Toronto Maple Leafs	NHL	64	20	50	70	12	2	1	0	1	0
1961–62	Toronto Maple Leafs	NHL	58	22	27	49	6	12	4	6	10	0
1962–63	Toronto Maple Leafs	NHL	66	20	40	60	8	10	2	6	8	6
1963–64	Toronto Maple Leafs	NHL	70	11	34	45	16	14	4	9	13	4
1964–65	Toronto Maple Leafs	NHL	70	18	28	46	8	6	3	2	5	2
1965–66	Toronto Maple Leafs	NHL	63	8	24	32	12	4	0	2	2	0
1966–67	Toronto Maple Leafs	NHL	61	14	24	38	4	12	0	5	5	2
NHL totals			1,316	281	542	823	327	164	33	59	92	51

== Coaching record ==
Team	Year	Regular season						Postseason
Team	Year	G	W	L	T	Pts	Finish	Result
LA	1967–68	74	31	33	10	72	2nd in West	Lost in quarter-finals (3-4 vs. MIN)
LA	1968–69	76	24	42	10	58	4th in West	Won in quarter-finals (4-3 vs. OAK); Lost in semi-finals (0-4 vs. STL)
PIT	1969–70	76	26	38	12	64	2nd in West	Won in quarter-finals (4-0 vs. OAK); Lost in semi-finals (2-4 vs. STL)
PIT	1970–71	78	21	37	20	62	6th in West	Did not qualify
PIT	1971–72	78	26	38	14	66	4th in West	Lost in quarter-finals (0-4 vs. CHI)
PIT	1972–73	42	17	19	6	(73)	5th in West	(fired)
TOR	1973–74	78	35	27	16	86	4th in East	Lost in quarter-finals (0-4 vs. BOS)
TOR	1974–75	80	31	33	16	78	3rd in Adams	Won in preliminary round (2-1 vs. LA); Lost in quarter-finals (0-4 vs. PHI)
TOR	1975–76	80	34	31	15	83	3rd in Adams	Won in preliminary round (2-1 vs. PIT); Lost in quarter-finals (3-4 vs. PHI)
TOR	1976–77	80	33	32	15	81	3rd in Adams	Won in preliminary round (2-1 vs. PIT); Lost in quarter-finals (2-4 vs. PHI)
LA Total		150	55	75	20	130		7-11 (0.389)
PIT Total		274	90	132	52	232		6-8 (0.429)
TOR Total		318	133	123	62	328		11-19 (0.367)
Total		742	278	330	134	690		24-38 (0.388)

== Electoral record ==
1963 Canadian federal election: York West
Party	Candidate	Votes	%	±%
Liberal	Red Kelly	41,480	51.4	+9.1
Progressive Conservative	Alan Eagleson	24,479	30.3	-6.9
New Democratic	David Middleton	14,003	17.4	-1.4
Social Credit	David R. Milne	697	0.9	-0.7
Total valid votes		80,659	100.0	

1962 Canadian federal election: York West
Party	Candidate	Votes	%	±%
Liberal	Red Kelly	32,362	42.4	+15.0
Progressive Conservative	John B. Hamilton	28,467	37.3	-22.8
New Democratic	David Middleton	14,356	18.8	+7.4
Social Credit	David R. Milne	1,205	1.6	+0.5
Total valid votes		76,390	100.0	
Note: ±% for NDP as compared to CCF's 1958 results.

== See also ==
- Captain (hockey)
- List of NHL players with 1,000 games played

Preceded by Edgar Laprade	Winner of the Lady Byng Trophy; 1951	Succeeded by Sid Smith
Preceded by Sid Smith	Winner of the Lady Byng Trophy; 1953, 1954	Succeeded by Sid Smith
Preceded by New award	Winner of the Norris Trophy; 1954	Succeeded by Doug Harvey
Preceded by Ted Lindsay	Detroit Red Wings captain 1956–58	Succeeded by Gordie Howe
Preceded by Don McKenney	Winner of the Lady Byng Trophy; 1961	Succeeded by Dave Keon
Preceded by Position created	Head Coach of the Los Angeles Kings; 1967–69	Succeeded by Hal Laycoe
Preceded by Red Sullivan	Head coach of the Pittsburgh Penguins; 1969–73	Succeeded by Ken Schinkel
Preceded by John McLellan	Head coach of the Toronto Maple Leafs; 1973–77	Succeeded by Roger Neilson
Preceded by Jack Riley	General Manager of the Pittsburgh Penguins; 1970–72	Succeeded by Jack Riley
