= NHL Central Scouting Bureau =

National Hockey League scouting department

The NHL Central Scouting Services (CSS) is a department within the National Hockey League (NHL) that ranks prospects for the NHL entry draft at specific times during the hockey season. Players are ranked based on how well they will translate to the professional game in the NHL. The Central Scouting Bureau also organizes the NHL draft combine.

It was founded by hockey executive Jack Button in 1975, to establish a centralized database of NHL prospects. Button served as the director until 1979. Its current director is Dan Marr. The Department consists of staff at the NHL Offices in Toronto, along with eight full-time scouts, and fifteen part-time scouts throughout North America. To report on prospects playing in Europe, the NHL employs the services of Göran Stubb and his staff of six scouts at European Scouting Services based in Finland. All twenty-nine scouts reporting for Central Scouting will combine to see approximately 3000 games each year.

== Rankings procedure ==
The full-time staff of the Central Scouting Service follows a checklist to assess the prospects' skillset and how it would apply to the pro game. Prospects are rated by skill as Excellent (E), Very Good (VG), Good (G), Average (A), Poor (P), or Not Applicable (NA), with different skills being emphasized amongst the different positions: forward, defenceman, and goaltender. The Service releases the contents of the checklists to the public from their website, so anyone can evaluate players at any level of play. The rankings are compiled by numerous reviews by the professional scouts' combined opinions of the players and released as a bimonthly list.

Eligible players for the upcoming draft are ranked as North American Skaters, North American Goalies, European Skaters, or European Goalies. The players fit under the North American or International player based on where they train. For example, the Czech forward, Jakub Voracek was ranked as a North American prospect, because he played with the Halifax Mooseheads in the Quebec Major Junior Hockey League. A more recent example is American center Auston Matthews who was first on the European ranks, as he played for the ZSC Lions of the NLA.

Updated rankings are released multiple times each year. Notably, the midterm rankings come out after the IIHF World Junior Championships and performance in the tournament greatly elevates draft status. In early April, after all junior and European seasons are completed, the final rankings are released.

The CSS collaborates with NHL general managers to select players for the annual CHL/USA Prospects Challenge, a two-game junior ice hockey series between the Canadian Hockey League (CHL) and the USA Hockey National Team Development Program to showcase the talents of top prospects for the upcoming NHL entry draft.

== History ==
The department was created at the March 1975 Governor's meeting. In its initial decades, the Central Scouting lists were a cost-saving measure to reduce scouting costs. Because of this purpose, they were considered confidential to the teams, and the CSS took active steps to prevent disclosure. These steps included slight variance in the lists, to identify the source of any public releases. The first widespread disclosure was of the 1979 draft. The lists remained confidential for the next decade, with partial "leaks" providing some details. Starting in 1992, the league began publishing a complete Mid-Year (January) and Final (May) list, and the NHL now publicizes the releases.

== Directors ==
- Jack Button: 1975–1979
- Jim Gregory: 1979–1987
- Frank Bonello: 1988–2005
- E. J. McGuire: 2005–2011
- Dan Marr: 2011–present
