= Jack Button =

- Born: 1940; Rushville, New York, U.S.
- Died: July 31, 1996 (aged 56); Washington, D.C., U.S.
- Occupations: Director of the NHL Central Scouting Service 1975–1979 *Secretary & Public Relations Director of the American Hockey League
- Known for: Jack Button Award
- Title: General manager *Pittsburgh Penguins 1974–75; *Amarillo Wranglers 1968–69; Assistant General Manager, Director of Scouting and Player Personnel; Pittsburgh Penguins 1969–1974; Director of Player Recruitment; *Washington Capitals 1979–83; Director of Player Personnel & Recruitment; *Washington Capitals 1983–92; Director of Player Personnel; *Washington Capitals 1992–96
- Children: Craig Button, Tod Button

John Carl Button (1940 – July 31, 1996) was an American professional hockey executive with the Pittsburgh Penguins and Washington Capitals of the National Hockey League (NHL). The Jack Button Award, given to the top prospect for the Washington Capitals, was created in his honor. He died of leukemia in 1996.

== NHL clubs ==
Button served as an assistant general manager while with the Penguins from 1969 until 1974, when he was named as the franchise's third general manager. At the end of the 1974-75 season, the Penguins entered bankruptcy. The new owners included Wren Blair as a minority partner, who took over the managerial reins. In Washington, Button was highly regarded as a scout and he was credited with discovering Peter Bondra, Jim Carey, Sergei Gonchar, Michal Pivonka and Brendan Witt. He was a part of the Capital franchise from 1979 until his death in 1996. During the 1996–97 season, the Capitals wore a memorial patch for Button which showcased his initials and a bulldog.

== Minor league clubs ==
Button was public relations director of the Rochester Americans from 1964 until 1966, then moved to the American Hockey League office as the league's PR director. He also served as league secretary. In 1968, the Pittsburgh Penguins appointed him general manager of their Central Hockey League affiliate, the Amarillo Wranglers. The club played only one season, after which Button was promoted to the Penguins' front office.

== League work ==
Button founded the NHL Central Scouting Bureau and served as its first director from 1975 until 1979.

== Family ==
Button is the father of Craig, a former executive with the Dallas Stars and Calgary Flames, as well as a former pro scout with the Toronto Maple Leafs. His other son Tod is the Flames' current director of scouting. Noteworthy mention as well is his son Sean Button, an esteemed pediatric emergency physician at Children's Hospital of Pittsburgh.

Preceded by Jack Riley	General Manager of the Pittsburgh Penguins; 1974–75	Succeeded by Wren Blair
