= Tony Esposito =

Canadian-American ice hockey player (1943–2021)

Tony Esposito Tony O
- Hockey Hall of Fame, 1988
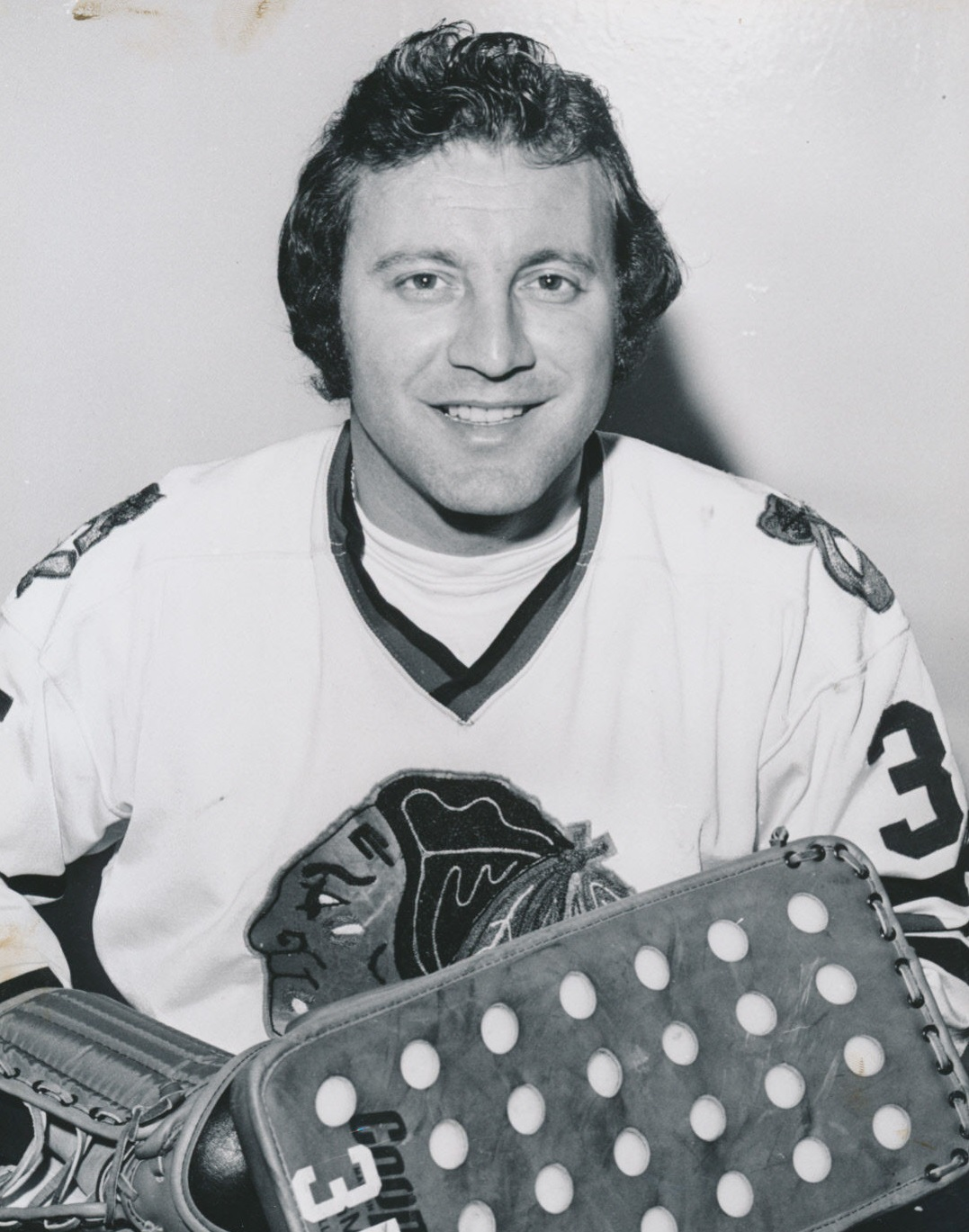
- Esposito with the Chicago Blackhawks in 1973
- Born: April 23, 1943 Sault Ste. Marie, Ontario, Canada
- Died: August 10, 2021 (aged 78) Chicago, Illinois, U.S.
- Height: 5 ft 11 in (180 cm)
- Weight: 185 lb (84 kg; 13 st 3 lb)
- Position: Goaltender
- Caught: Right
- Played for: Montreal Canadiens; Chicago Blackhawks
- National team: Canada and United States
- Playing career: 1967–1984

Anthony James Esposito (April 23, 1943 – August 10, 2021) was a Canadian-American professional ice hockey goaltender, who played 16 seasons in the National Hockey League (NHL), 15 of those for the Chicago Blackhawks. He was one of the pioneers of the now popular butterfly style. Tony was the younger brother of Phil Esposito, a centre. Both brothers had notable careers and are enshrined in the Hockey Hall of Fame. Esposito's jersey number 35 was retired by the Blackhawks in 1988.

Esposito won the NHL's Vezina Trophy, then awarded to the goaltender(s) of the team which allowed the fewest goals in the regular season, three times, most notably in 1970, when he recorded the modern (since 1942) NHL record of 15 shutouts in a season. He was also awarded the Calder Trophy as the best rookie in the league that season. He was named to the league's First All-Star Team three times and to the Second All-Star Team two times, and served as one of Canada's two goaltenders in the 1972 Summit Series between Canada and the Soviet Union. In 2017 Esposito was named one of the '100 Greatest NHL Players' in history.

== Hockey career ==
=== Early years ===
Esposito grew up in Sault Ste. Marie, Ontario with his brother, fellow future NHL star Phil Esposito. Phil described why Tony wound up playing goalie as a child: "Tony and I would play by ourselves or we'd get two other guys and practice shooting. One guy would be the goaltender and the others would shoot and the guy with the fewest goals would take over in goal. Tony won't like me saying this, but he always lost. I guess you could say that's how he wound up as a goalie." He played college ice hockey for Michigan Tech.

A three-year hockey varsity letter winner, Esposito was a three-time first-team All-America selection. He was a driving force in helping the Michigan Tech Huskies to the 1964–65 NCAA Championship and was named a first-team NCAA All-Tournament Team choice in 1965. Esposito was also a three-time All-WCHA first-team selection. In 2021, Esposito was named to the WCHA All-Decade Team for the 1960s.

Esposito turned professional with the Vancouver Canucks in the Western Hockey League in 1967–68 and played with the Houston Apollos in the Central Hockey League in 1968–69.

He first played in the NHL for the Montreal Canadiens during the 1968–69 season at age 25. He was only the third American college player selected by an NHL team. Esposito made his NHL debut against the Oakland Seals, playing 26 minutes in relief of Rogie Vachon. His first NHL start was against the Boston Bruins, then led by his brother Phil. The game ended in a 2–2 tie, in which Phil scored both goals for Boston and Tony made 33 saves. Esposito played thirteen regular-season games, due to both Gump Worsley and Vachon being injured. However, Esposito returned to the minor leagues when they both returned from their injuries. Worsley was injured again during the playoffs, so Esposito was called again. He served as backup to Vachon, dressing for all four games in the Final as Montreal won the Stanley Cup, with Esposito having his name engraved on there as a winning member. As the Canadiens club was deep in goaltenders at that time, with Worsley, Vachon, and other prospects in the system, Esposito was left unprotected by the Canadiens in 1969.

=== Rise to fame ===
For the 1969–70 season, the Chicago Blackhawks claimed him from Montreal on waivers, known at the time as the "intra-league draft". Esposito had a spectacular season with Chicago, posting a 2.17 GAA and setting a modern-day NHL record with fifteen shutouts, for which he won the Calder Memorial Trophy as the league's best rookie. He also took the Vezina Trophy (then awarded to the goalies for the team which allowed the fewest goals during the regular seasons) and was named to the First All-Star team at season's end. He also was runner-up for league MVP (Hart Memorial Trophy). It was during this record-setting season that he earned the nickname "Tony O" for his shutout abilities, with the big letter O looking like the big zero that he kept holding opponents to. In 1970–71, he again proved to be one of the league's top goalies and helped Chicago finish first in the NHL's West division. The Blackhawks made it to the Stanley Cup Final, but lost in seven games to Montreal. The following season he posted the lowest GAA of his career (1.77) and shared the Vezina with backup Gary Smith. He was again selected to the NHL's First All-Star team.

Esposito was named to Team Canada for the Summit Series of September 1972. He was the first goalie to earn a win against the Soviets, splitting Canada's goaltending duties with Montreal's Ken Dryden. Esposito posted both the lowest GAA and the highest save percentage of the three goalies (Esposito, Ken Dryden, and Vladislav Tretiak) who appeared in the series. Tony's brother Phil had an exceptional series as well and was the inspirational leader of the team.

Despite the loss of Bobby Hull, Esposito and the Hawks led their division in 1972–73, but lost the Stanley Cup in six games to Montreal. Esposito was named to the NHL's Second All-Star team that year. The next season, 1973–74, was another brilliant season with a sparkling 2.04 GAA and 10 shutouts. Esposito won his third Vezina, sharing it with the Philadelphia Flyers' Bernie Parent, and was again named a Second Team All-Star.

The Blackhawks declined over the next few seasons although Esposito remained among the top netminders in the NHL. Tony won his 300th game on December 3, 1978, with a 4 -3 win over the Colorado Rockies. In 1979–80, Esposito enjoyed a fine season with six shutouts and made the First All-Star team for the third time. In 1981, he became a naturalized American citizen and played for Team USA in the Canada Cup (he had previously represented Canada at the 1977 Ice Hockey World Championship tournament). He played a few more seasons in Chicago before retiring after the 1983–84 season.

=== Goaltending style ===
Esposito wrote:

I don't like the stand-up style myself because I feel you get caught out of position too much. Instead of backing into the goal, you're moving out of the net as the shooters approach. When you move out and they make a pass across the net, I feel you give the pass receiver an open net to shoot at.

I try to play the angles on the shooter. I believe in starting out beyond the crease area and then backing in as the shooter approaches–the way Hall or Roger Crozier do it. It's a new approach to goaltending.

When I was younger, I was a stand-up goaltender. I feel I could still play that way, but I think I'm more effective playing my up-and-down style. I call this aggressive goaltending. You attack the puck.

The other way you are playing the percentage. As I grow older, I may have to adjust to the stand-up style because with age you start to slow down physically. A guy nearing forty certainly couldn't play my style. Hall did and was very effective, but he is a very strong man.

== Distinctions ==
Esposito is one of eight goalies to have won the Vezina catching the puck right-handed (that is, he was left-handed, using his dominant left hand for his stick and blocker). The other seven are fellow Blackhawks' legend Charlie Gardiner (in 1932 and 1934), the New York Rangers' Davey Kerr (1940), ambidextrous Montreal goalie Bill Durnan (1944–1947, 1949 and 1950), the New York Rangers' Gilles Villemure (1971), Tom Barrasso of the Buffalo Sabres (1984), Edmonton Oilers' Grant Fuhr (1988), and José Théodore of the Montreal Canadiens in 2002.

Esposito was the second NHL player to wear the number 35, a common number now worn by many goaltenders. Minnesota North Star goaltender Fern Rivard was the first to wear 35 during the 1968-69 NHL season. It was assigned to him during training camp prior to Chicago's 1969–70 season because the standard goalie numbers 1 and 30 were already assigned. After posting a shutout in his first exhibition game for the team, he chose to keep wearing the number. His number 35 was retired by the Blackhawks on November 20, 1988.

Esposito was noted as being superstitious, becoming upset by crossed hockey sticks, and regularly lining up his hockey sticks in a particular way. Esposito also has the record for most Consecutive Stanley Cup playoff losses at 16.

Esposito wore contact lenses throughout his career.

== Retirement ==
He retired from professional play in 1984 and was named to the Hockey Hall of Fame in 1988. His number 35 was retired by the Blackhawks on November 20, 1988.

Esposito later became General Manager of the Pittsburgh Penguins. During his tenure, Esposito selected Mark Recchi at the 1988 NHL entry draft and traded for goaltender Tom Barrasso on November 1989. He was fired on December 5, 1989 by the team and replaced by Craig Patrick. Two years later, the Penguins won the Stanley Cup. In 1991, when his brother helped found the Tampa Bay Lightning, Phil hired Tony as chief scout. Both Espositos were fired in 1998 after the team was sold.

In 1998, he was ranked number 79 on The Hockey News' list of the 100 Greatest Hockey Players, 61 places behind his brother Phil, who ranked number 18.

In 2007, Tony was inducted, alongside his brother Phil, into the Sault Ste. Marie Walk of Fame.

On March 19, 2008, the Chicago Blackhawks honoured Esposito with "Tony Esposito Night", where he was formally introduced as an Ambassador for the Blackhawks organization. Then-Blackhawk goaltenders Patrick Lalime and Nikolai Khabibulin both wore Esposito's #35 on their jerseys in the pre-game warmups, and Khabibulin recorded a shutout in a Hawks 5–0 win over the Washington Capitals.

In 2024, Tony was inducted into the Michigan Sports Hall of Fame.

== Personal life ==
Esposito and his wife Marilyn had two sons, Mark and Jason. Tony Esposito died on August 10, 2021, at the age of 78, from pancreatic cancer.

== In popular culture ==
- Garth Algar (Dana Carvey) wears Esposito's jersey while playing road hockey in Wayne's World and Wayne's World 2.
- He made an appearance in the second season of Rent-a-Goalie playing poker alongside his brother Phil.

== Awards and honours ==
Award	Year
All-WCHA First Team	1964–65
AHCA West All-American	1964–65
All-NCAA All-Tournament First Team	1965
All-WCHA First Team	1965–66
AHCA West All-American	1965–66
All-WCHA First Team	1966–67
AHCA West All-American	1966–67

- Stanley Cup Champion (1969).
- Calder Memorial Trophy (1970).
- NHL First All-Star Team Goalie (1970, 1972, 1980).
- NHL Second All-Star Team Goalie (1973, 1974).
- Vezina Trophy (1970, 1972, 1974).
- NHL All-Star Game Goalie (1970, 1971, 1972, 1973, 1974, 1980).
- His #35 was retired by the Chicago Blackhawks on November 20, 1988.
- In 1998, he was ranked number 79 on The Hockey News' list of the 100 Greatest Hockey Players.
- Hockey Hall of Fame 1988
- Michigan Sports Hall of Fame 2024

== Career statistics ==
=== Regular season and playoffs ===
Bold indicates led league

			Regular season									Playoffs
Season	Team	League	GP	W	L	T	MIN	GA	SO	GAA	SV%	GP	W	L	MIN	GA	SO	GAA	SV%
1962–63	Sault Ste. Marie Greyhounds	NOJHA	—	—	—	—	—	—	—	—	—	—	—	—	—	—	—	—	—
1963–64	Michigan Tech	WCHA	—	—	—	—	—	—	—	—	—	—	—	—	—	—	—	—	—
1964–65	Michigan Tech	WCHA	17	—	—	—	1020	40	1	2.35	—	—	—	—	—	—	—	—	—
1965–66	Michigan Tech	WCHA	19	—	—	—	1140	51	1	2.68	—	—	—	—	—	—	—	—	—
1966–67	Michigan Tech	WCHA	15	—	—	—	900	39	0	2.60	—	—	—	—	—	—	—	—	—
1967–68	Vancouver Canucks	WHL	63	25	33	4	3734	199	4	3.20	—	—	—	—	—	—	—	—	—
1968–69	Montreal Canadiens	NHL	13	5	4	4	746	34	2	2.73	.913	—	—	—	—	—	—	—	—
1968–69	Houston Apollos	CHL	19	10	7	2	1139	46	1	2.42	—	1	0	1	59	3	0	3.05	—
1969–70	Chicago Blackhawks	NHL	63	**38**	17	9	3763	136	**15**	2.17	**.932**	8	4	**4**	480	27	0	3.38	.907
1970–71	Chicago Blackhawks	NHL	57	**35**	14	6	3325	126	6	2.27	.919	18	11	7	1151	42	2	**2.19**	**.928**
1971–72	Chicago Blackhawks	NHL	48	31	10	6	2780	82	**9**	**1.77**	**.934**	5	2	3	300	16	0	3.20	.895
1972–73	Chicago Blackhawks	NHL	56	32	17	7	3340	140	4	2.51	.917	15	10	5	895	46	1	3.08	.898
1973–74	Chicago Blackhawks	NHL	70	34	14	**21**	4143	141	10	2.04	.928	10	6	4	584	28	**2**	2.88	.911
1974–75	Chicago Blackhawks	NHL	71	34	30	7	**4219**	193	6	2.74	.905	8	3	**5**	472	34	0	4.32	.878
1975–76	Chicago Blackhawks	NHL	**68**	30	23	13	**3992**	198	4	2.97	.904	4	0	4	240	13	0	3.25	.901
1976–77	Chicago Blackhawks	NHL	**69**	25	**36**	8	**4067**	**234**	2	3.45	.900	2	0	2	120	6	0	3.00	.915
1977–78	Chicago Blackhawks	NHL	68	28	22	14	3840	168	5	2.63	.914	4	0	4	252	19	0	4.52	.838
1978–79	Chicago Blackhawks	NHL	63	24	28	11	**3773**	**206**	4	3.27	.901	4	0	4	243	14	0	3.46	.889
1979–80	Chicago Blackhawks	NHL	**69**	31	22	**16**	**4131**	205	**6**	2.97	.903	6	3	3	373	14	0	2.25	.924
1980–81	Chicago Blackhawks	NHL	**66**	29	23	14	**3926**	246	0	3.75	.890	3	0	3	215	15	0	4.19	.878
1981–82	Chicago Blackhawks	NHL	52	19	25	8	3069	231	1	4.52	.867	7	3	3	381	16	**1**	2.52	.917
1982–83	Chicago Blackhawks	NHL	39	23	11	5	2340	135	1	3.46	.888	5	3	2	311	18	0	3.47	.889
1983–84	Chicago Blackhawks	NHL	18	5	10	3	1095	88	1	4.82	.859	—	—	—	—	—	—	—	—
NHL totals			886	423	306	151	52,583	2,563	76	2.92	.906	99	45	53	6,017	308	6	3.07	.903

=== International ===
Year	Team	Event	GP	W	L	T	MIN	GA	SO	GAA
1972	Canada	SS	4	2	1	1	240	13	0	3.25
1977	Canada	WC	9	6	2	1	510	27	1	3.17
1981	United States	CC	5	2	3	0	300	20	0	4.00
Senior totals			18	10	6	2	1050	60	1	3.43

"Esposito's stats". The Goaltender Home Page.

== See also ==
- List of NHL goaltenders with 300 wins
- Notable families in the NHL

Awards
Preceded by Danny Grant	Winner of the Calder Memorial Trophy; 1970	Succeeded by Gilbert Perreault
Preceded by Glenn Hall and Jacques Plante	Winner of the Vezina Trophy; 1970	Succeeded by Eddie Giacomin and Gilles Villemure
Preceded by Eddie Giacomin and Gilles Villemure	Winner of the Vezina Trophy with Gary Smith; 1972	Succeeded by Ken Dryden
Preceded by Ken Dryden	Winner of the Vezina Trophy tied with Bernie Parent; 1974	Succeeded by Bernie Parent
Sporting positions
Preceded by Phil Esposito	NHLPA President; February 10, 1981 – October 24, 1984	Succeeded by Bryan Trottier
Preceded by Eddie Johnston	General Manager of the Pittsburgh Penguins; 1988–89	Succeeded by Craig Patrick
