= Noelle Needham =

American ice hockey executive

- Born: 1986 (age 39–40); Elkton, South Dakota, United States
- Occupation: Assistant general manager
- Organization: Chicago Steel

Noelle Needham is an American ice hockey executive, currently serving as assistant general manager of the Chicago Steel in the USHL.

== Career ==
In her youth, Needham was a highly touted prospect, attending Shattuck-Saint Mary's, before tearing her ACL, MCL, PCL and meniscus when she was 15, needing eight reconstructive surgeries. From 2004 to 2007, she played hockey for Minnesota State University as a forward, posting 31 points across 97 NCAA games. She was forced to leave hockey after suffering a life-threatening staph infection and facing limited options for professional careers in women's hockey.

After some time working as a rancher, she returned to hockey, volunteering as a coach for a local girls' team. In 2009, she founded the Legend Hockey development centre, and founded the Sioux Falls Power five years later as a Tier 1 junior team.

In 2018, she was hired as an amateur scout by the NHL's Toronto Maple Leafs, covering the Midwestern United States region.

In 2020, she left the Maple Leafs to join the Chicago Steel of the USHL as assistant general manager. Later that year, The Hockey News named her as one of ten women who could potentially be a future NHL general manager.
