= Eddie Johnston =

Canadian ice hockey player (born 1935)

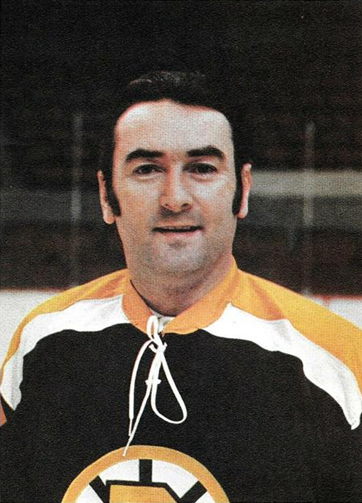
- Johnston in 1970 photo
- Born: November 24, 1935 (age 90) Montreal, Quebec, Canada
- Height: 6 ft 0 in (183 cm)
- Weight: 190 lb (86 kg; 13 st 8 lb)
- Position: Goaltender
- Caught: Left
- Played for: Boston Bruins; Toronto Maple Leafs; St. Louis Blues; Chicago Black Hawks
- Playing career: 1956–1978

Edward Joseph Johnston (born November 24, 1935) is a Canadian former professional ice hockey goaltender, coach, and general manager in the National Hockey League (NHL). His professional career spanned fifty-three years (twenty-two as a player and thirty-one in management), mostly in the NHL. He won two Stanley Cups as a player with the Boston Bruins in 1970 and 1972, and three as senior advisor for hockey operations with the Pittsburgh Penguins (2009, 2016, 2017), an organization he worked in various capacities for twenty-five years. He was the last NHL goaltender to play every minute of every game in a season, doing so in the 1963–64 season.

== Playing career ==
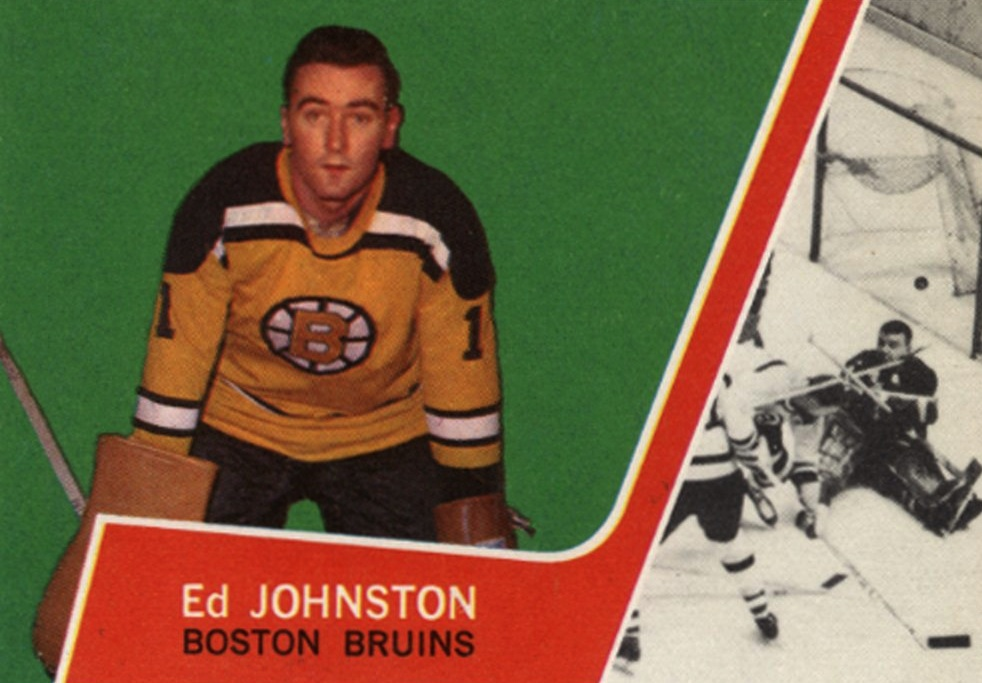
1963 Topps card of Johnston

=== Early years ===
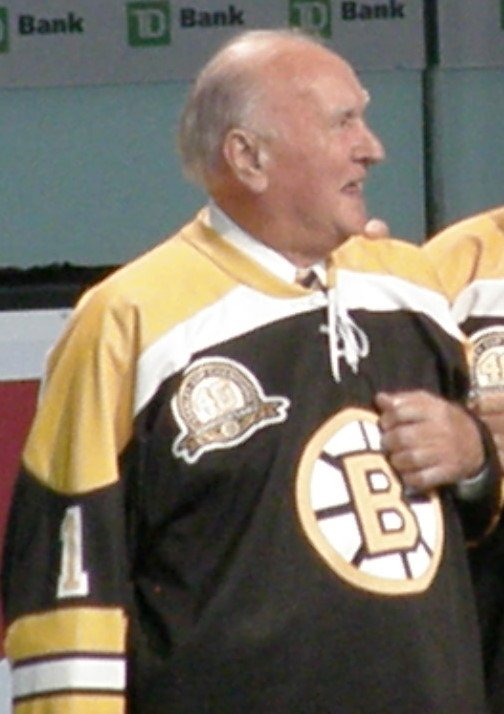
Johnston at the TD Garden in 2010.

Johnston grew up in an anglophone neighborhood in Montreal and was often called "E.J.", a nickname by which he is still known. He became interested in ice hockey as a youth and became a goaltender.

Johnston began his hockey career as a teenager in 1953 with the Montreal Junior Royals of the Quebec Junior Hockey League. After six years in the minor leagues in which he won multiple championships. Some of his more impressive seasons during this time came in the 1959-60 EHL season when he played in every single game for the team going 43-18-1 as they went on to win the EHL championship. He would follow this up the following year by playing all 70 games for the Hull Ottawa Canadians going 41-20-9 with a 2.67 GAA also leading them to a league championship. After once again playing all 70 games for the Spokane comets he was then called up in 1962 by the Boston Bruins, who owned his rights and for whom he would play the bulk of his NHL career.

=== NHL ===
During the 1963-64 season, Johnston played in every single game for the Bruins, being the last NHL goaltender to do so.

The Bruins were a mediocre team in his first five seasons, finishing out of the playoffs every year and often in last place. This changed after expansion in 1967, when after acquiring Bobby Orr and Phil Esposito, the resurgent Bruins became a powerhouse. With this Johnston started to see great success as well in the early 70s. In a back up role to Gerry Cheevers Johnston went 16-9-11 overall as he and the Bruins won the Stanley Cup in 1970. The following year during the 1970–71 season Johnston boasted an impressive 30-6-2 record with a career best 2.53 GAA but the bruins fell in the first round of the playoffs. Once again Johnston excelled in his position during the 1971-72 season having another great regular season for the Bruins going 27-8-3 overall. This led to him having a more substantial role during the postseason playing in 13 playoff games going 6-1 overall (including Games 2, 4, 5 of the Stanley Cup Finals), even posting a lower GAA then Cheevers as he and the Bruins won the 1972 Stanley Cup. Johnston’s performance didn’t go unnoticed as he would end up being named to Team Canada for the Summit Series in 1972, although Johnston played only in exhibition matches. In the 1972-73 season, after defections to the new World Hockey Association, this left Johnston as the number one goaltender for the Bruins once more, he had a decent year going 24-17-1 but did not play nearly as well as he once did and was traded after the season to the Toronto Maple Leafs in completion of the trade that brought Jacques Plante to Boston. After one season with the Leafs, Johnston was dealt to the St. Louis Blues, for whom he was a credible backup for three seasons. In his final season, 1977-78, he played poorly in twelve games for St. Louis and was then sold to the Chicago Black Hawks, for whom he played in four matches to end his playing career. At the time of his retirement, he was ninth all-time in games played by a goaltender, sixteenth all-time in goaltending wins, and sixth in losses.

On Halloween night in 1968, Johnston was severely injured by Bobby Orr's slapshot to the side of his head during a warm-up in Detroit. He spent six weeks in the hospital. Remarkably, Johnston emerged from the coma, was given a clean bill of health shortly thereafter, and returned later that season. Orr took full responsibility for accident and the two men remain good friends to this day. In a 2020 interview Johnston stated “I’m always on the phone with Bobby,” “We talk hockey a lot. Things we like about the game. Things we don’t like. We get a little worked up sometimes.” As for Orr he had this to say about Johnston “He didn’t always play and it was hard for him, Of course he wanted to be playing more. But he never complained. Never made trouble. He just wanted to win. He was an incredible teammate and I’ve never forgotten that. Eddie was tough. He was really tough, the last goalie to play in all 70 games in a season. Nowadays, guys worry if 45 or 50 games is too many to play. Don’t let him fool you with that sense of humor. He was tough. But at the same time, he had a big heart.”

Johnston and Cheevers goaltending duo is still considered one of the best in Bruins history.

Johnston recorded seven playoff wins for Boston in his career. That total, as of 2019, ranks him 13th on the Bruins' all-time list for playoff victories by a goaltender.

Johnston's 27 regular-season shutouts rank him fifth on Boston's all-time list heading into the 2021-22 season, one ahead of longtime teammate Gerry Cheevers.

Johnston was later inducted into the Canada sports hall of fame in 2005.

== Coach and general manager ==
The year after he retired as a player, Johnston became the coach of the New Brunswick Hawks, the Chicago Black Hawks' new American Hockey League farm team, and led them to a 41–29–10 record and second place in its division.

He became head coach of the Black Hawks during the 1979–80 NHL season and compiled a 34–27–19 record. The following year, he became head coach of the Pittsburgh Penguins and in 1983 was appointed general manager. He held the GM post at Pittsburgh for five years. Johnston oversaw Pittsburgh's selection of Mario Lemieux in the entry draft; without Lemieux, Johnston said about the Penguins' home arena, Mellon Arena, "This place would be a parking lot." Lemieux would come to be known as the team's repeated saviour, as well as one of the greatest hockey players of all time.

After Johnston left the Penguins for the first time in 1988, he served as the general manager of the Hartford Whalers from 1989 until his release in 1992 where they made the playoffs each of his four seasons at the helm. Johnston's tenure in Hartford is remembered for his trading the organization's marquee player, Ron Francis.

Johnston traded Francis, along with his roommate Ulf Samuelsson, to Pittsburgh as part of a six-player deal on March 4, 1991. Although some thought that Hartford got the better end of the bargain as the centre John Cullen had been among the league leaders in scoring with 94 points in 65 games that season and Zarley Zalapski was seen as a young defenseman with great promise, the deal proved to more beneficial to the Penguins as the popular Francis and Samuelsson immediately went on to play major roles in Pittsburgh's first two Stanley Cup championships in 1991 and 1992, while neither Cullen nor Zalapski could duplicate their success with Pittsburgh in Hartford.

After being considered for the position for the 1992–93 season but having been unable to agree to terms on a contract with Pittsburgh, Johnston was once again hired as head coach of the Penguins for 1993–94 and guided the Penguins until the 1996–97 season, when he was asked to step down due to the Penguins' failure to win a third Stanley Cup under his guidance. He spent the next nine years as the assistant general manager to Craig Patrick before being named Senior Adviser for Hockey Operations in July 2006, his 23rd year with the Pittsburgh Penguins organization. It was in that capacity as the Penguins finally won their third Stanley Cup in 2009.

In 2009, Johnston announced that game seven of the Final would be his last and moved into semi-retirement.

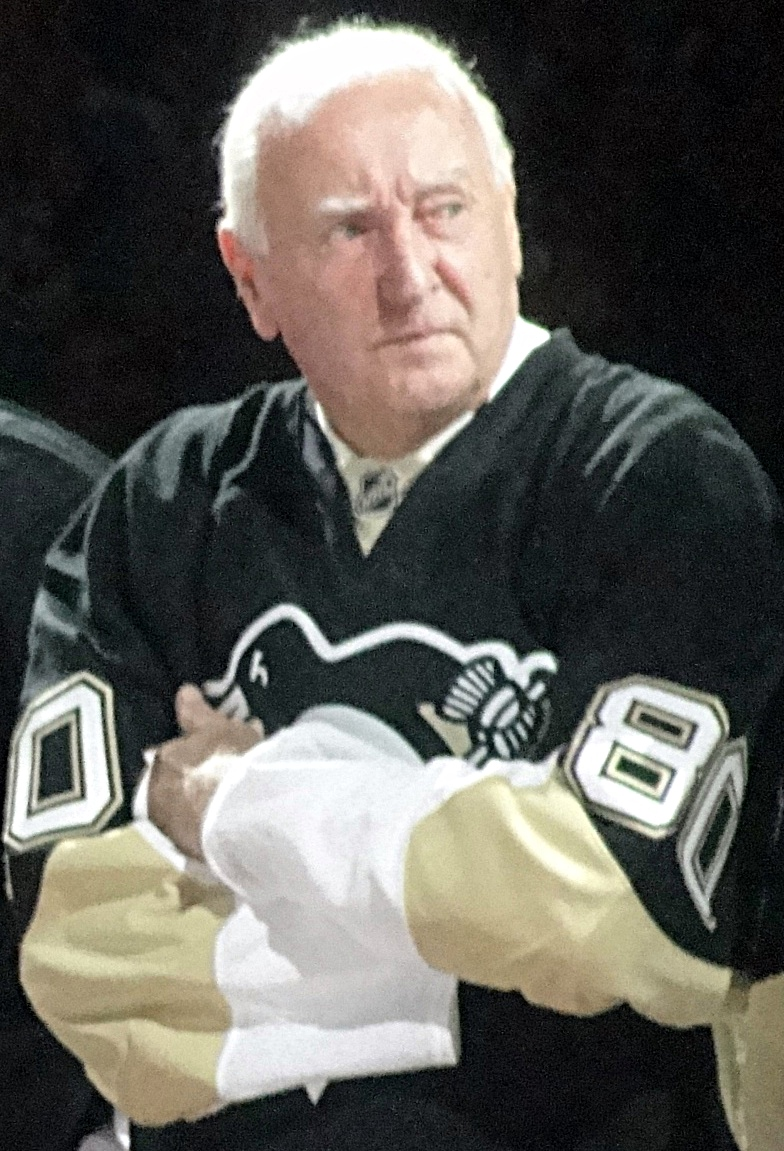
Johnston in Pittsburgh for the final regular season game at Mellon Arena, April 2010.

On April 8, 2010, Johnston joined more than 50 former Penguins being honored in a pre-game ceremony before the final regular season game at Mellon Arena in Pittsburgh.

On January 7, 2014, against the Vancouver Canucks, Dan Bylsma passed him as the Penguins all-time leader in coaching wins with 233. Johnston remains the Penguins' all-time leader in coaching losses (224) and games coached (516).

After going into semi retirement Johnston continued to serve as an ambassador for the Penguins, who won another two Stanley Cups in 2016 and 2017. He continues to attend many Pittsburgh home games. He is considered one of the most important figures in shaping the Penguins.

Johnston works for the 3-on-3 professional ice hockey league 3ICE as deputy commissioner, and where is his son E.J. Johnston is CEO. Johnston also was head coach for his team for the 2023 season.

On October 25, 2026, Johnston alongside Ron Francis, Kevin Stevens, and Scott Bowman was inducted into the Pittsburgh Penguins Hall of Fame.

Johnston spends time in Florida, where he enjoys playing golf. He and his wife, Diane, have three children, Michelle, E.J. Jr., and Joe, and four grandchildren.

== Awards and achievements ==
- EHL First All-Star Team (1960)
- EHL champion (1960)
- EPHL First All-Star Team (1961)
- EPHL champion (1961)
- WHL Second All-Star Team (1962)
- Elizabeth C. Dufresne Trophy (1964)
- 5 time Stanley Cup champion (1970, 1972, 2009, 2016, 2017)
- Named to play for Team Canada in the 1972 Summit Series.
- Canada sports hall of fame (2005)
- Named One of the Top 100 Best Bruins Players of all Time.
- Pittsburgh Penguins Hall of Fame (2025)

== Career statistics ==
=== Regular season and playoffs ===
Bold indicates led league

			Regular season									Playoffs
Season	Team	League	GP	W	L	T	MIN	GA	SO	GAA	SV%	GP	W	L	T	MIN	GA	SO	GAA	SV%
1953–54	Montréal Jr. Royals	QJHL	35	—	—	—	—	226	0	—	—	4	0	4	0	240	32	0	8.00	—
1954–55	Trois-Rivières Reds	QJHL	46	20	24	2	2760	169	1	3.67	—	10	3	7	0	613	29	1	2.84	—
1955–56	Chatham Maroons	OHA-Sr.	7	—	—	—	420	31	0	4.43	—	—	—	—	—	—	—	—	—	—
1955–56	Moncton Hawks	ACSHL	1	1	0	0	60	2	0	2.00	—	—	—	—	—	—	—	—	—	—
1955–56	Chicoutimi Saguenéens	QHL	1	0	0	0	20	1	0	3.00	—	—	—	—	—	—	—	—	—	—
1955–56	Montréal Jr. Canadiens	M-Cup	—	—	—	—	—	—	—	—	—	10	5	4	1	598	27	2	2.71	—
1956–57	Winnipeg Warriors	WHL	50	17	32	1	3040	192	2	3.79	—	—	—	—	—	—	—	—	—	—
1957–58	Shawinigan Cataractes	QHL	63	31	27	5	3760	230	5	3.67	—	14	8	6	—	880	49	1	3.34	—
1958–59	Edmonton Flyers	WHL	49	26	21	2	2960	163	1	3.30	—	3	0	3	—	180	12	0	4.00	—
1959–60	Johnstown Jets	EHL	63	—	—	—	3780	169	4	2.68	—	13	9	4	—	780	25	2	1.92	—
1960–61	Hull-Ottawa Canadiens	EPHL	70	41	20	9	4200	187	11	2.67	—	14	8	6	—	857	27	0	1.89	—
1961–62	Spokane Comets	WHL	70	37	28	5	4310	237	3	3.30	—	16	9	7	—	972	58	1	3.58	—
1962–63	Boston Bruins	NHL	50	11	27	10	2913	193	1	3.98	.893	—	—	—	—	—	—	—	—	—
1963–64	Boston Bruins	NHL	70	18	**40**	**12**	**4200**	211	6	3.01	.914	—	—	—	—	—	—	—	—	—
1964–65	Boston Bruins	NHL	47	11	32	4	2820	163	3	3.47	.897	—	—	—	—	—	—	—	—	—
1965–66	Boston Bruins	NHL	33	10	19	2	1744	108	1	3.72	.894	—	—	—	—	—	—	—	—	—
1965–66	Los Angeles Blades	WHL	5	2	2	0	260	10	1	2.31	—	—	—	—	—	—	—	—	—	—
1966–67	Boston Bruins	NHL	34	8	21	2	1880	116	0	3.70	.880	—	—	—	—	—	—	—	—	—
1967–68	Boston Bruins	NHL	28	11	8	5	1524	73	0	2.87	.897	—	—	—	—	—	—	—	—	—
1968–69	Boston Bruins	NHL	24	14	6	4	1440	74	2	3.08	.898	1	0	1	—	65	4	0	3.69	.867
1969–70	Boston Bruins	NHL	37	16	9	11	2176	108	3	2.98	.906	1	0	1	—	60	4	0	4.00	.897
1970–71	Boston Bruins	NHL	38	30	6	2	2280	96	4	2.53	.914	1	0	1	—	60	7	0	7.00	.811
1971–72	Boston Bruins	NHL	38	27	8	3	2260	102	2	2.71	.899	7	**6**	1	—	420	13	1	1.86	**.936**
1972–73	Boston Bruins	NHL	45	24	17	1	2510	137	5	3.27	.885	3	1	2	—	160	9	0	3.38	.897
1973–74	Toronto Maple Leafs	NHL	26	12	9	4	1516	78	1	3.09	.894	1	0	1	—	60	6	0	6.00	.800
1974–75	St. Louis Blues	NHL	30	12	13	5	1800	93	2	3.10	.895	1	0	1	—	60	5	0	5.00	.828
1975–76	St. Louis Blues	NHL	38	11	17	9	2152	130	1	3.62	.872	—	—	—	—	—	—	—	—	—
1976–77	St. Louis Blues	NHL	38	13	16	5	2111	108	1	3.07	.882	3	0	2	—	138	9	0	3.91	.893
1977–78	St. Louis Blues	NHL	12	5	6	1	650	45	0	4.15	.853	—	—	—	—	—	—	—	—
1977–78	Chicago Black Hawks	NHL	4	1	3	0	240	17	0	4.25	.851	—	—	—	—	—	—	—	—	—
NHL totals			592	234	257	80	34,216	1852	32	3.25	.895	18	7	10	—	1023	57	1	3.34	.894

"Johnston's stats". The Goaltender Home Page.

=== Coaching record ===
League	Team	Year	Regular season						Post season
League	Team	Year	G	W	L	T	Pts	Finish	Result
NHL
NHL	Chicago Blackhawks	1979–80	80	34	27	19	87	1st in Smythe	Lost in quarter-finals (STL)
NHL	Pittsburgh Penguins	1980–81	80	30	37	13	73	4th in Norris	Lost in preliminary round (STL)
NHL	Pittsburgh Penguins	1981–82	80	31	36	13	75	4th in Patrick	Lost in division semi-finals (NYI)
NHL	Pittsburgh Penguins	1982–83	80	18	53	9	45	6th in Patrick	Missed playoffs
NHL	Pittsburgh Penguins	1993–94	84	44	27	13	101	**1st in Northeast**	Lost in conference quarter-finals (WSH)
NHL	Pittsburgh Penguins	1994–95	48	29	16	3	61	2nd in Northeast	Lost in conference semi-finals (NJD)
NHL	Pittsburgh Penguins	1995–96	82	49	29	4	102	**1st in Northeast**	Lost in conference finals (FLA)
NHL	Pittsburgh Penguins	1996–97	62	31	26	5	67	2nd in Northeast	Fired
NHL totals		596	266	251	60	592	2 Division Titles	25-28 (.472)	

Preceded by Bill White	Head coach of the Chicago Blackhawks; 1979–80	Succeeded by Keith Magnuson
Preceded by Johnny Wilson	Head coach of the Pittsburgh Penguins; 1980–83	Succeeded by Lou Angotti
Preceded by Baz Bastien	General Manager of the Pittsburgh Penguins; 1983–88	Succeeded by Tony Esposito
Preceded by Emile Francis	General Manager of the Hartford Whalers; 1989–92	Succeeded by Brian Burke
Preceded by Scotty Bowman	Head coach of the Pittsburgh Penguins; 1993–97	Succeeded by Craig Patrick
