= 1969–70 Toronto Maple Leafs season =

NHL hockey team season

1969–70 Toronto Maple Leafs
- Division: 6th East
- 1969–70 record: 29–34–13
- Home record: 18–13–7
- Road record: 11–21–6
- Goals for: 222
- Goals against: 242

Team information
- General manager: Jim Gregory
- Coach: John McLellan
- Captain: Dave Keon
- Alternate captains: Ron Ellis; Bob Pulford
- Arena: Maple Leaf Gardens

Team leaders
- Goals: Ron Ellis (35)
- Assists: Norm Ullman (42)
- Points: Dave Keon (62)
- Penalty minutes: Rick Ley (102)
- Wins: Bruce Gamble (19)
- Goals against average: Bruce Gamble (3.06)

The 1969–70 Toronto Maple Leafs season was the 53rd season of play of the NHL Toronto franchise and 43rd as the Maple Leafs. After qualifying for the playoffs the previous season, the Leafs fell to last-place in the NHL East and did not qualify for the playoffs for the first time since the 1967–68 season, also marking the first time since 1958 that the club endured a last place finish.

== Offseason ==
Punch Imlach's term as Maple Leafs' general manager ended after the 1969 playoffs. Jim Gregory, who had been an executive with the Toronto Marlboros was named general manager, the first new GM for the Maple Leafs since 1957.

=== NHL draft ===
| Round | # | Player | Nationality | College/Junior/Club team (League) |
|---|---|---|---|---|
| 1 | 9 | Ernie Moser | Canada | Estevan Bruins (WCHL) |
| 2 | 20 | Doug Brindley | Canada | Niagara Falls Flyers (OHA) |
| 3 | 31 | Larry McIntyre | Canada | Moose Jaw Canucks (SJHL) |
| 4 | 43 | Frank Hughes | Canada | Edmonton Oil Kings (WCHL) |
| 5 | 55 | Brian Spencer | Canada | Moose Jaw Canucks (SJHL) |
| 6 | 67 | Bob Neufeld | Canada | Dauphin Kings (MJHL) |

== Regular season ==
=== Season standings ===
East Division
| | | GP | W | L | T | GF | GA | DIFF | Pts |
|---|---|---|---|---|---|---|---|---|---|
| 1 | Chicago Black Hawks | 76 | 45 | 22 | 9 | 250 | 170 | +80 | 99 |
| 2 | Boston Bruins | 76 | 40 | 17 | 19 | 277 | 216 | +61 | 99 |
| 3 | Detroit Red Wings | 76 | 40 | 21 | 15 | 246 | 199 | +47 | 95 |
| 4 | New York Rangers | 76 | 38 | 22 | 16 | 246 | 189 | +57 | 92 |
| 5 | Montreal Canadiens | 76 | 38 | 22 | 16 | 244 | 201 | +43 | 92 |
| 6 | Toronto Maple Leafs | 76 | 29 | 34 | 13 | 222 | 242 | −20 | 71 |

=== Record vs. opponents ===
==== Vs. East Division ====
1969–70 NHL records
| Team | BOS | CHI | DET | MTL | NYR | TOR | Total |
|---|---|---|---|---|---|---|---|
| Boston | — | 3–3–2 | 1–2–5 | 2–3–3 | 4–4 | 4–3–1 | 14–15–11 |
| Chicago | 3–3–2 | — | 4–4 | 4–4 | 4–1–3 | 4–3–1 | 19–15–6 |
| Detroit | 2–1–5 | 4–4 | — | 4–2–2 | 2–4–2 | 6–2 | 18–13–9 |
| Montreal | 3–2–3 | 4–4 | 2–4–2 | — | 4–3–1 | 4–1–3 | 17–14–9 |
| New York | 4–4 | 1–4–3 | 4–2–2 | 3–4–1 | — | 6–2 | 18–16–6 |
| Toronto | 3–4–1 | 3–4–1 | 2–6 | 1–4–3 | 2–6 | — | 11–24–5 |

==== Vs. West Division ====
1969–70 NHL records
| Team | LAK | MIN | OAK | PHI | PIT | STL | Total |
|---|---|---|---|---|---|---|---|
| Boston | 5–0–1 | 4–1–1 | 5–0–1 | 4–0–2 | 5–0–1 | 3–1–2 | 26–2–8 |
| Chicago | 5–1 | 3–2–1 | 3–3 | 4–0–2 | 6–0 | 4–2 | 25–8–3 |
| Detroit | 6–0 | 1–1–4 | 4–2 | 3–1–2 | 4–2 | 4–2 | 22–8–6 |
| Montreal | 6–0 | 2–2–2 | 3–2–1 | 4–0–2 | 4–2 | 2–2–2 | 21–8–7 |
| New York | 4–1–1 | 3–1–2 | 5–1 | 0–0–6 | 4–1–1 | 4–2 | 20–6–10 |
| Toronto | 3–1–2 | 2–2–2 | 4–1–1 | 3–2–1 | 2–2–2 | 4–2 | 18–10–8 |

== Schedule and results ==
1969–70 regular season
October

| Game | Result | Date | Score | Opponent | Record |
|---|---|---|---|---|---|
| 1 | L | October 11, 1969 | 2–3 | @ Detroit Red Wings (1969–70) | 0–1–0 |
| 2 | T | October 15, 1969 | 2–2 | Montreal Canadiens (1969–70) | 0–1–1 |
| 3 | W | October 18, 1969 | 4–1 | Chicago Black Hawks (1969–70) | 1–1–1 |
| 4 | L | October 19, 1969 | 0–1 | @ New York Rangers (1969–70) | 1–2–1 |
| 5 | L | October 22, 1969 | 3–4 | Philadelphia Flyers (1969–70) | 1–3–1 |
| 6 | W | October 25, 1969 | 4–2 | St. Louis Blues (1969–70) | 2–3–1 |
| 7 | W | October 29, 1969 | 4–2 | Boston Bruins (1969–70) | 3–3–1 |

November

| Game | Result | Date | Score | Opponent | Record |
|---|---|---|---|---|---|
| 8 | L | November 1, 1969 | 2–3 | New York Rangers (1969–70) | 3–4–1 |
| 9 | T | November 2, 1969 | 4–4 | @ Boston Bruins (1969–70) | 3–4–2 |
| 10 | W | November 4, 1969 | 5–2 | @ Oakland Seals (1969–70) | 4–4–2 |
| 11 | L | November 5, 1969 | 2–6 | @ Los Angeles Kings (1969–70) | 4–5–2 |
| 12 | L | November 8, 1969 | 3–6 | @ Montreal Canadiens (1969–70) | 4–6–2 |
| 13 | L | November 9, 1969 | 0–9 | @ Chicago Black Hawks (1969–70) | 4–7–2 |
| 14 | L | November 12, 1969 | 0–3 | Pittsburgh Penguins (1969–70) | 4–8–2 |
| 15 | W | November 15, 1969 | 4–2 | Philadelphia Flyers (1969–70) | 5–8–2 |
| 16 | T | November 19, 1969 | 4–4 | Los Angeles Kings (1969–70) | 5–8–3 |
| 17 | W | November 22, 1969 | 4–0 | Detroit Red Wings (1969–70) | 6–8–3 |
| 18 | W | November 23, 1969 | 3–2 | @ Philadelphia Flyers (1969–70) | 7–8–3 |
| 19 | L | November 26, 1969 | 1–3 | Montreal Canadiens (1969–70) | 7–9–3 |
| 20 | W | November 29, 1969 | 5–2 | Minnesota North Stars (1969–70) | 8–9–3 |
| 21 | L | November 30, 1969 | 1–4 | @ Boston Bruins (1969–70) | 8–10–3 |

December

| Game | Result | Date | Score | Opponent | Record |
|---|---|---|---|---|---|
| 22 | T | December 3, 1969 | 5–5 | @ Minnesota North Stars (1969–70) | 8–10–4 |
| 23 | W | December 6, 1969 | 5–0 | Pittsburgh Penguins (1969–70) | 9–10–4 |
| 24 | L | December 7, 1969 | 2–3 | @ Pittsburgh Penguins (1969–70) | 9–11–4 |
| 25 | L | December 10, 1969 | 3–6 | @ Montreal Canadiens (1969–70) | 9–12–4 |
| 26 | L | December 11, 1969 | 3–6 | @ Philadelphia Flyers (1969–70) | 9–13–4 |
| 27 | L | December 13, 1969 | 1–3 | Detroit Red Wings (1969–70) | 9–14–4 |
| 28 | W | December 14, 1969 | 3–1 | @ New York Rangers (1969–70) | 10–14–4 |
| 29 | L | December 20, 1969 | 2–5 | New York Rangers (1969–70) | 10–15–4 |
| 30 | W | December 21, 1969 | 3–0 | @ Detroit Red Wings (1969–70) | 11–15–4 |
| 31 | W | December 24, 1969 | 8–1 | Los Angeles Kings (1969–70) | 12–15–4 |
| 32 | L | December 26, 1969 | 1–3 | @ St. Louis Blues (1969–70) | 12–16–4 |
| 33 | W | December 27, 1969 | 4–1 | St. Louis Blues (1969–70) | 13–16–4 |
| 34 | T | December 31, 1969 | 1–1 | Oakland Seals (1969–70) | 13–16–5 |

January

| Game | Result | Date | Score | Opponent | Record |
|---|---|---|---|---|---|
| 35 | W | January 3, 1970 | 6–2 | Chicago Black Hawks (1969–70) | 14–16–5 |
| 36 | T | January 4, 1970 | 4–4 | @ Pittsburgh Penguins (1969–70) | 14–16–6 |
| 37 | T | January 7, 1970 | 3–3 | Minnesota North Stars (1969–70) | 14–16–7 |
| 38 | W | January 10, 1970 | 4–3 | Boston Bruins (1969–70) | 15–16–7 |
| 39 | L | January 14, 1970 | 1–7 | New York Rangers (1969–70) | 15–17–7 |
| 40 | L | January 15, 1970 | 0–2 | @ St. Louis Blues (1969–70) | 15–18–7 |
| 41 | W | January 17, 1970 | 4–0 | Pittsburgh Penguins (1969–70) | 16–18–7 |
| 42 | W | January 22, 1970 | 3–2 | @ Los Angeles Kings (1969–70) | 17–18–7 |
| 43 | L | January 23, 1970 | 3–6 | @ Oakland Seals (1969–70) | 17–19–7 |
| 44 | W | January 25, 1970 | 3–2 | @ Chicago Black Hawks (1969–70) | 18–19–7 |
| 45 | T | January 28, 1970 | 4–4 | @ Pittsburgh Penguins (1969–70) | 18–19–8 |
| 46 | W | January 31, 1970 | 4–2 | @ Minnesota North Stars (1969–70) | 19–19–8 |

February

| Game | Result | Date | Score | Opponent | Record |
|---|---|---|---|---|---|
| 47 | L | February 1, 1970 | 6–7 | @ Boston Bruins (1969–70) | 19–20–8 |
| 48 | W | February 4, 1970 | 1–0 | St. Louis Blues (1969–70) | 20–20–8 |
| 49 | L | February 5, 1970 | 1–4 | @ Detroit Red Wings (1969–70) | 20–21–8 |
| 50 | W | February 7, 1970 | 5–1 | Oakland Seals (1969–70) | 21–21–8 |
| 51 | T | February 11, 1970 | 3–3 | @ Montreal Canadiens (1969–70) | 21–21–9 |
| 52 | T | February 12, 1970 | 3–3 | @ Philadelphia Flyers (1969–70) | 21–21–10 |
| 53 | W | February 14, 1970 | 4–3 | Philadelphia Flyers (1969–70) | 22–21–10 |
| 54 | L | February 15, 1970 | 4–6 | @ Chicago Black Hawks (1969–70) | 22–22–10 |
| 55 | W | February 18, 1970 | 5–3 | Montreal Canadiens (1969–70) | 23–22–10 |
| 56 | L | February 21, 1970 | 5–7 | Detroit Red Wings (1969–70) | 23–23–10 |
| 57 | L | February 22, 1970 | 3–5 | @ New York Rangers (1969–70) | 23–24–10 |
| 58 | W | February 25, 1970 | 4–1 | Oakland Seals (1969–70) | 24–24–10 |
| 59 | T | February 28, 1970 | 3–3 | Los Angeles Kings (1969–70) | 24–24–11 |

March

| Game | Result | Date | Score | Opponent | Record |
|---|---|---|---|---|---|
| 60 | L | March 1, 1970 | 0–8 | @ Minnesota North Stars (1969–70) | 24–25–11 |
| 61 | W | March 3, 1970 | 4–1 | @ Oakland Seals (1969–70) | 25–25–11 |
| 62 | W | March 5, 1970 | 5–3 | @ Los Angeles Kings (1969–70) | 26–25–11 |
| 63 | L | March 7, 1970 | 3–8 | Minnesota North Stars (1969–70) | 26–26–11 |
| 64 | L | March 11, 1970 | 1–3 | Detroit Red Wings (1969–70) | 26–27–11 |
| 65 | W | March 14, 1970 | 2–1 | Boston Bruins (1969–70) | 27–27–11 |
| 66 | T | March 15, 1970 | 3–3 | Montreal Canadiens (1969–70) | 27–27–12 |
| 67 | L | March 18, 1970 | 4–7 | Chicago Black Hawks (1969–70) | 27–28–12 |
| 68 | W | March 21, 1970 | 2–0 | @ St. Louis Blues (1969–70) | 28–28–12 |
| 69 | W | March 22, 1970 | 5–2 | @ New York Rangers (1969–70) | 29–28–12 |
| 70 | L | March 25, 1970 | 2–5 | @ Montreal Canadiens (1969–70) | 29–29–12 |
| 71 | T | March 28, 1970 | 1–1 | Chicago Black Hawks (1969–70) | 29–29–13 |
| 72 | L | March 29, 1970 | 0–4 | @ Chicago Black Hawks (1969–70) | 29–30–13 |

April

| Game | Result | Date | Score | Opponent | Record |
|---|---|---|---|---|---|
| 73 | L | April 1, 1970 | 1–2 | New York Rangers (1969–70) | 29–31–13 |
| 74 | L | April 2, 1970 | 2–4 | @ Detroit Red Wings (1969–70) | 29–32–13 |
| 75 | L | April 4, 1970 | 2–4 | Boston Bruins (1969–70) | 29–33–13 |
| 76 | L | April 5, 1970 | 1–3 | @ Boston Bruins (1969–70) | 29–34–13 |

Legend: Win (2 points) Loss (0 points) Tie (1 point)

== Player statistics ==
=== Regular season ===
Scoring

| Player | Pos | GP | G | A | Pts | PIM | PPG | SHG | GWG |
|---|---|---|---|---|---|---|---|---|---|
| Dave Keon | C | 72 | 32 | 30 | 62 | 6 | 9 | 2 | 4 |
| Norm Ullman | C | 74 | 18 | 42 | 60 | 37 | 4 | 1 | 0 |
| Mike Walton | C | 58 | 21 | 34 | 55 | 68 | 7 | 0 | 6 |
| Ron Ellis | RW | 76 | 35 | 19 | 54 | 14 | 6 | 1 | 3 |
| Murray Oliver | C | 76 | 14 | 33 | 47 | 16 | 5 | 0 | 3 |
| Jim McKenny | D | 73 | 11 | 33 | 44 | 34 | 3 | 0 | 0 |
| Paul Henderson | RW | 67 | 20 | 22 | 42 | 18 | 5 | 0 | 4 |
| Bob Pulford | LW | 74 | 18 | 19 | 37 | 31 | 3 | 0 | 1 |
| George Armstrong | RW | 49 | 13 | 15 | 28 | 12 | 2 | 0 | 3 |
| Brit Selby | LW | 74 | 10 | 13 | 23 | 40 | 1 | 0 | 3 |
| Tim Horton | D | 59 | 3 | 19 | 22 | 91 | 1 | 0 | 1 |
| Floyd Smith | RW | 61 | 4 | 14 | 18 | 13 | 0 | 0 | 0 |
| Jim Harrison | C | 31 | 7 | 10 | 17 | 36 | 1 | 0 | 0 |
| Jim Dorey | D | 46 | 6 | 11 | 17 | 99 | 0 | 0 | 0 |
| Rick Ley | D | 48 | 2 | 13 | 15 | 102 | 1 | 0 | 0 |
| Brian Glennie | D | 52 | 1 | 14 | 15 | 50 | 0 | 0 | 0 |
| Terry Clancy | RW | 52 | 6 | 5 | 11 | 31 | 0 | 0 | 1 |
| Pat Quinn | D | 59 | 0 | 5 | 5 | 88 | 0 | 0 | 0 |
| Mike Pelyk | D | 36 | 1 | 3 | 4 | 37 | 0 | 0 | 0 |
| Doug Acomb | C | 2 | 0 | 1 | 1 | 0 | 0 | 0 | 0 |
| Wayne Carleton | LW | 7 | 0 | 1 | 1 | 6 | 0 | 0 | 0 |
| Marv Edwards | G | 13 | 0 | 1 | 1 | 24 | 0 | 0 | 0 |
| Bruce Gamble | G | 52 | 0 | 1 | 1 | 0 | 0 | 0 | 0 |
| Ken Murray | D | 1 | 0 | 1 | 1 | 2 | 0 | 0 | 0 |
| Marcel Pronovost | D | 7 | 0 | 1 | 1 | 4 | 0 | 0 | 0 |
| Ron Ward | C | 18 | 0 | 1 | 1 | 2 | 0 | 0 | 0 |
| Johnny Bower | G | 12 | 0 | 0 | 0 | 0 | 0 | 0 | 0 |
| Chris Evans | D | 2 | 0 | 0 | 0 | 0 | 0 | 0 | 0 |
| Danny Johnson | C | 1 | 0 | 0 | 0 | 0 | 0 | 0 | 0 |
| Larry McIntyre | D | 1 | 0 | 0 | 0 | 0 | 0 | 0 | 0 |
| Gerry McNamara | G | 2 | 0 | 0 | 0 | 0 | 0 | 0 | 0 |
| Randy Murray | D | 3 | 0 | 0 | 0 | 2 | 0 | 0 | 0 |
| Gord Nelson | D | 3 | 0 | 0 | 0 | 11 | 0 | 0 | 0 |
| Brian Spencer | LW | 9 | 0 | 0 | 0 | 12 | 0 | 0 | 0 |

Goaltending

| Player | MIN | GP | W | L | T | GA | GAA | SO |
|---|---|---|---|---|---|---|---|---|
| Bruce Gamble | 3057 | 52 | 19 | 24 | 9 | 156 | 3.06 | 5 |
| Marv Edwards | 728 | 13 | 5 | 4 | 2 | 37 | 3.25 | 1 |
| Johnny Bower | 632 | 12 | 4 | 10 | 0 | 55 | 4.728 | 0 |
| Gerry McNamara | 23 | 2 | 0 | 0 | 0 | 2 | 5.22 | 0 |
| Team: | 4560 | 76 | 29 | 34 | 13 | 260 | 3.19 | 6 |

Note:

Pos = Position;GP = Games played; G = Goals; A = Assists; Pts = Points; PIM = Penalty minutes; +/- = Plus/minus; PPG = Power-play goals; SHG = Short-handed goals; GWG = Game-winning goals
Pos = Position;GP = Games played; Min, TOI = Minutes played; W = Wins; L = Losses; T,T/OT = Ties; OTL = Overtime losses; GA = Goals-against; GAA = Goals-against average; SO = Shutouts; SA = Shots against; SV = Shots saved;SV% = Save percentage;

== Transactions ==
The Maple Leafs have been involved in the following transactions during the 1969–70 season.

=== Trades ===
| December 10, 1969 | To Boston Bruins Wayne Carleton | To Toronto Maple Leafs Jim Harrison |
| February 1, 1970 | To Los Angeles Kings Gary Marsh | To Toronto Maple Leafs Jacques Lemieux |
| March 3, 1970 | To New York Rangers Tim Horton | To Toronto Maple Leafs Denis Dupere |
| May 1, 1970 | To Vancouver Canucks (WHL) Cash | To Toronto Maple Leafs Brad Selwood; Rene Robert |
| May 18, 1970 | To St. Louis Blues Cash | To Toronto Maple Leafs Jacques Plante |
| May 22, 1970 | To Phoenix Roadrunners (WHL) Cash | To Toronto Maple Leafs Chris Evans; Tom Martin |
| May 22, 1970 | To Minnesota North Stars Murray Oliver | To Toronto Maple Leafs Terry O'Malley; Brian Conacher |

=== Intra-league draft ===
| June 9, 1970 | From New York Rangers Guy Trottier |
| June 9, 1970 | To Detroit Red Wings Tom Martin |

=== Reverse draft ===
| June 9, 1970 | To Vancouver Canucks (WHL) John Wright |

=== Expansion draft ===
| June 10, 1970 | To Vancouver Canucks Danny Johnson |

=== Free agents ===
| Player | Former team |
| Doug Acomb | Undrafted Free Agent |
| Bob Liddington | Undrafted Free Agent |
| Brian Marchinko | Undrafted Free Agent |
| Gordie Nelson | Undrafted Free Agent |
| Ken Murray | Undrafted Free Agent |
