= 1969–70 Los Angeles Kings season =

National Hockey League team season

1969–70 Los Angeles Kings
- Division: 6th West
- 1969–70 record: 14–52–10
- Home record: 12–22–4
- Road record: 2–30–6
- Goals for: 168
- Goals against: 289

Team information
- General manager: Larry Regan
- Coach: Hal Laycoe and Johnny Wilson
- Captain: Larry Cahan
- Alternate captains: Bob Wall; Eddie Joyal
- Arena: Los Angeles Forum

Team leaders
- Goals: Eddie Shack (22)
- Assists: Butch Goring and Leon Rochefort (23)
- Points: Ross Lonsberry (42)
- Penalty minutes: Ross Lonsberry (118)
- Wins: Gerry Desjardins (7)
- Goals against average: Denis DeJordy (3.24)

The 1969–70 Los Angeles Kings season was the third ever for the Los Angeles Kings in the National Hockey League (NHL). After qualifying for the playoffs in each of their first two seasons, under the direction of coach Red Kelly (who left to take the Pittsburgh job), the Kings finished the season with an NHL-worst record of 14-52-10 (38 points). The team also fired coach Hal Laycoe after just 24 games. His replacement, Johnny Wilson, did not fare much better, winning just nine of the remaining 52 games on the schedule. For the first time in team history, the Kings failed to qualify for the playoffs.

The last remaining active member of the 1969–70 Los Angeles Kings was Butch Goring, who retired after the 1984–85 season.

== Offseason ==
In the Entry Draft, the Kings chose goaltender Dale Hoganson with their first pick, 16th overall in the second round.

== Regular season ==
The Kings endured some long stretches of futility during the 1969–70 season:

- From January 29 through March 5, they went 17 straight games without a victory (0–13–4)
- From November 8 through November 29, they went 10 straight games without a victory (0–9–1)
- From January 11 through January 25, and again from January 29 through February 15, they lost 8 straight games
- From January 11 through February 15, they suffered 11 consecutive road losses.
- Their only two victories away from home all season were: December 2 (4–3 at Oakland) and January 10 (6–4 at Minnesota)

=== Season standings ===
West Division
		GP	W	L	T	GF	GA	DIFF	Pts
1	St. Louis Blues	76	37	27	12	224	179	+45	86
2	Pittsburgh Penguins	76	26	38	12	182	238	−56	64
3	Minnesota North Stars	76	19	35	22	224	257	−33	60
4	Oakland Seals	76	22	40	14	169	243	−74	58
5	Philadelphia Flyers	76	17	35	24	197	225	−28	58
6	Los Angeles Kings	76	14	52	10	168	290	−122	38

=== Record vs. opponents ===
==== Vs. West Division ====
1969–70 NHL records
Team	LAK	MIN	OAK	PHI	PIT	STL	Total
Los Angeles	—	2–2–4	5–2–1	2–5–1	2–6	0–8	11–23–6
Minnesota	2–2–4	—	1–5–2	3–4–1	2–5–1	2–4–2	10–20–10
Oakland	2–5–1	5–2–1	—	2–3–3	3–2–3	2–4–2	14–16–10
Philadelphia	5–2–1	4–3–1	3–2–3	—	1–5–2	1–5–2	14–17–9
Pittsburgh	6–2	5–2–1	2–3–3	5–1–2	—	1–5–2	19–13–8
St. Louis	8–0	4–2–2	4–2–2	5–1–2	5–1–2	—	26–6–8

==== Vs. East Division ====
1969–70 NHL records
Team	BOS	CHI	DET	MTL	NYR	TOR	Total
Los Angeles	0–5–1	1–5	0–6	0–6	1–4–1	1–3–2	3–29–4
Minnesota	1–4–1	2–3–1	1–1–4	2–2–2	1–3–2	2–2–2	9–15–12
Oakland	0–5–1	3–3	2–4	2–3–1	1–5	1–4–1	9–24–3
Philadelphia	0–4–2	0–4–2	1–3–2	0–4–2	0–0–6	2–3–1	3–18–15
Pittsburgh	0–5–1	0–6	2–4	2–4	1–4–1	2–2–2	7–25–4
St. Louis	1–3–2	2–4	2–4	2–2–2	2–4	2–4	11–21–4

== Schedule and results ==
1969–70 regular season
October

Game	Date	Opponent	Score	Location	Record
1	11	Montreal Canadiens	1–5	Montreal	0–1–0
2	15	St. Louis Blues	1–4	St. Louis	0–2–0
3	17	Oakland Seals	1–5	Oakland	0–3–0
4	18	Oakland Seals	5–0	Los Angeles	1–3-0
5	22	Pittsburgh Penguins	2–0	Los Angeles	2–3-0
6	25	Boston Bruins	2–3	Los Angeles	2–4–0
7	29	Detroit Red Wings	2–5	Los Angeles	2–5–0

November

Game	Date	Opponent	Score	Location	Record
8	1	Chicago Black Hawks	1–4	Los Angeles	2–6–0
9	5	Toronto Maple Leafs	6–2	Los Angeles	3–6-0
10	8	New York Rangers	1–4	Los Angeles	3–7–0
11	10	Montreal Canadiens	3–6	Los Angeles	3–8–0
12	15	Pittsburgh Penguins	1–3	Pittsburgh	3–9–0
13	16	Boston Bruins	4–7	Boston	3–10–0
14	19	Toronto Maple Leafs	4–4	Toronto	3-10–1
15	20	Philadelphia Flyers	2–3	Philadelphia	3–11–1
16	22	Minnesota North Stars	1–4	Minnesota	3–12–1
17	26	Chicago Black Hawks	0–6	Chicago	3–13–1
18	27	Detroit Red Wings	1–5	Detroit	3–14–1
19	29	St. Louis Blues	1–3	St. Louis	3–15–1

December

Game	Date	Opponent	Score	Location	Record
20	2	Oakland Seals	4–3	Oakland	4–15-1
21	3	Philadelphia Flyers	1–7	Los Angeles	4–16–1
22	6	Oakland Seals	5–3	Los Angeles	5–16-1
23	10	Pittsburgh Penguins	0–2	Los Angeles	5–17–1
24	13	St. Louis Blues	1–8	Los Angeles	5–18–1
25	15	Minnesota North Stars	4–4	Los Angeles	5-182
26	17	Chicago Black Hawks	3–1	Los Angeles	6–18-2
27	20	Minnesota North Stars	3–3	Los Angeles	6-18–3
28	24	Toronto Maple Leafs	1–8	Toronto	6–19–3
29	25	Boston Bruins	1–7	Boston	6–20–3
30	28	New York Rangers	3–3	New York	6-20–4
31	30	Minnesota North Stars	0–0	Los Angeles	6-205

January

Game	Date	Opponent	Score	Location	Record
32	1	Philadelphia Flyers	4–3	Los Angeles	7–20-5
33	3	Boston Bruins	2–6	Los Angeles	7–21–5
34	6	Montreal Canadiens	3–4	Montreal	7–22–5
35	8	Philadelphia Flyers	1–4	Philadelphia	7–23–5
36	10	Minnesota North Stars	6–4	Minnesota	8–23-5
37	11	Chicago Black Hawks	1–3	Chicago	8–24–5
38	14	Montreal Canadiens	2–4	Montreal	8–25–5
39	15	Boston Bruins	3–6	Boston	8–26–5
40	17	St. Louis Blues	1–3	St. Louis	8–27–5
41	18	Detroit Red Wings	1–3	Detroit	8–28–5
42	22	Toronto Maple Leafs	2–3	Los Angeles	8–29–5
43	24	Pittsburgh Penguins	2–4	Pittsburgh	8–30–5
44	25	New York Rangers	2–3	New York	8–31–5
45	28	New York Rangers	5–4	Los Angeles	9–31-5
46	29	St. Louis Blues	2–3	Los Angeles	9–32–5
47	31	Detroit Red Wings	1–2	Los Angeles	9–33–5

February

Game	Date	Opponent	Score	Location	Record
48	5	Montreal Canadiens	3–5	Los Angeles	9–34–5
49	7	Pittsburgh Penguins	1–3	Pittsburgh	9–35–5
50	8	New York Rangers	1–5	New York	9–36–5
51	11	New York Rangers	2–6	Los Angeles	9–37–5
52	14	St. Louis Blues	1–2	St. Louis	9–38–5
53	15	Philadelphia Flyers	1–7	Philadelphia	9–39–5
54	18	Boston Bruins	5–5	Los Angeles	9-39–6
55	19	Pittsburgh Penguins	1–6	Los Angeles	9–40–6
56	21	St. Louis Blues	2–4	Los Angeles	9–41–6
57	25	Minnesota North Stars	3–3	Minnesota	9-41–7
58	26	Pittsburgh Penguins	0–1	Pittsburgh	9–42–7
59	28	Toronto Maple Leafs	3–3	Toronto	9-42–8

March

Game	Date	Opponent	Score	Location	Record
60	1	Philadelphia Flyers	4–4	Philadelphia	9-42–9
61	3	Chicago Black Hawks	1–3	Los Angeles	9–43–9
62	5	Toronto Maple Leafs	3–5	Los Angeles	9–44–9
63	7	Oakland Seals	5–3	Los Angeles	10–44-9
64	8	Oakland Seals	2–2	Oakland	10-44–10
65	12	Pittsburgh Penguins	4–1	Los Angeles	11–44-10
66	14	Philadelphia Flyers	3–5	Los Angeles	11–45–10
67	15	Chicago Black Hawks	2–5	Chicago	11–46–10
68	17	Detroit Red Wings	2–3	Detroit	11–47–10
69	19	Montreal Canadiens	1–6	Los Angeles	11–48–10
70	21	Detroit Red Wings	1–4	Los Angeles	11–49–10
71	24	St. Louis Blues	0–4	Los Angeles	11–50–10
72	26	Philadelphia Flyers	3–2	Los Angeles	12–50-10
73	28	Minnesota North Stars	4–2	Los Angeles	13–50-10
74	31	Minnesota North Stars	2–5	Minnesota	13–51–10

April

Game	Date	Opponent	Score	Location	Record
75	3	Oakland Seals	1–4	Oakland	13–52–10
76	4	Oakland Seals	4–1	Los Angeles	14–52-10

Legend: Win (2 points) Loss (0 points) Tie (1 point)

== Player statistics ==
Note: GP = Games played; G = Goals; A = Assists; Pts = Points; PIM = Penalty minutes

Player	GP	G	A	Pts	PIM
Ross Lonsberry	76	20	22	42	118
Eddie Joyal	59	18	22	40	8
Butch Goring	59	13	23	36	8
Eddie Shack	73	22	12	34	113
Bill Flett	69	14	18	32	70
Leon Rochefort	76	9	23	32	14
Jimmy Peters Jr.	74	15	9	24	10
Ted Irvine	58	11	13	24	10
Phil "Skip" Krake	58	5	17	22	86
Bob Wall	70	5	13	18	26
Bill White	40	4	11	15	21
Dick Duff	32	5	8	13	8
Dennis Hextall	28	5	7	12	40
Larry Cahan	70	4	8	12	52
Mike Corrigan	36	6	4	10	30
Matt Ravlich	21	3	7	10	34
Dale Rolfe	55	1	9	10	77
Bryan Campbell	31	4	4	8	4
Dale Hoganson	49	1	7	8	37
Brent Hughes	52	1	7	8	108
Real Lemieux	18	2	4	6	10
Gilles Marotte	21	0	6	6	32
Howie Hughes	21	0	4	4	0
Garry Monahan	21	0	3	3	12
Juha Widing	4	0	2	2	2
Jacques Lemieux	3	0	1	1	0
Jim Stanfield	1	0	0	0	0
Gary Croteau	3	0	0	0	0

=== Goaltending ===
Note: GP = Games played; MIN = Minutes; W = Wins; L = Losses; T = Ties; SO = Shutouts; GAA = Goals against average

Player	GP	MIN	W	L	T	SO	GAA
Denis DeJordy	21	1147	5	11	4	0	3.24
Gerry Desjardins	43	2453	7	29	5	3	3.89
Wayne Rutledge	20	960	2	12	1	0	4.25

== Transactions ==
The Kings were involved in the following transactions during the 1969–70 season.

=== Trades ===
May 14, 1969	To Los Angeles Kings Ross Lonsberry; Eddie Shack	To Boston Bruins Ken Turlik; 1st round pick in 1971 – Ron Jones; 1st round pick in 1973 – Andre Savard
June 9, 1969	To Los Angeles Kings Dennis Hextall; Leon Rochefort	To New York Rangers Real Lemieux
June 12, 1969	To Los Angeles Kings Cash	To St. Louis Blues 8th round pick in 1969 – Pat Lange
June 12, 1969	To Los Angeles Kings Cash	To Montreal Canadiens 6th round pick in 1969 – Guy Delparte; 7th round pick in 1969 – Ian Wilkie
September 1, 1969	To Los Angeles Kings Roger Cote	To Phoenix Roadrunners (WHL Jim Murray
November 17, 1969	To Los Angeles Kings Rights to Jean Potvin; 2nd round pick in 1970 – Al McDonough; 3rd round pick in 1970 – Terry Holbrook	To Montreal Canadiens 2nd round pick in 1970 – Buster Harvey; 3rd round pick in 1970 – Steve Carlyle; 4th round pick in 1970 – Cal Hammond
January 23, 1970	To Los Angeles Kings Dick Duff	To Montreal Canadiens Dennis Hextall; 2nd round pick in 1971 – Larry Robinson
February 1, 1970	To Los Angeles Kings Gary Marsh	To Toronto Maple Leafs Jacques Lemieux
February 20, 1970	To Los Angeles Kings Garry Monahan; Matt Ravlich; Brian Gibbons	To Detroit Red Wings Gary Croteau; Dale Rolfe; Larry Johnston
February 20, 1970	To Los Angeles Kings Gilles Marotte; Jim Stanfield; Denis DeJordy	To Chicago Black Hawks Bryan Campbell; Bill White; Gerry Desjardins
February 27, 1970	To Los Angeles Kings Real Lemieux; Juha Widing	To New York Rangers Ted Irvine

=== Free agent signings ===
November 15, 1969	From Springfield Kings (AHL) Jean Potvin

=== Intra-league Draft ===
June 11, 1969	To Chicago Black Hawks Howie Menard
June 11, 1969	To St. Louis Blues Ron Anderson

=== Reverse Draft ===
June 12, 1969	To Denver Spurs (WHL) Jacques Caron
June 12, 1969	From Pittsburgh Penguins Noel Price

== Draft picks ==
Round	Pick	Player	Nationality
2	16	Dale Hoganson	Canada
3	27	Gregg Boddy	Canada
4	39	Bruce Landon	Canada
5	51	Butch Goring	Canada

- NOTE: Back before 1979, the amateur draft was held with varying rules and procedures. In 1969, teams only needed to select as many player as they wanted to, which is why there were only four Kings players drafted.
