= 1969–70 NHL transactions =

The following is a list of all team-to-team transactions that have occurred in the National Hockey League during the 1969–70 NHL season. It lists what team each player has been traded to, signed by, or claimed by, and for which player(s) or draft pick(s), if applicable.

== Trades ==
=== May ===
May 7, 1969	To Boston Bruins 1st-round pick - 1969 Amateur Draft (# 3 - Don Tannahill) future considerations^{1} (Fred O'Donnell)	To Minnesota North Stars Barry Gibbs; Tom Williams
May 13, 1969	To New York Rangers Norm Beaudin; Norm Dennis	To St. Louis Blues cash
May 14, 1969	To Minnesota North Stars John Miszuk	To Philadelphia Flyers Wayne Hillman
May 14, 1969	To Boston Bruins Ken Turlik; 1st-round pick - 1971 Amateur Draft (# 6 - Ron Jones); 1st-round pick - 1973 Amateur Draft (# 6 - Andre Savard)	To Los Angeles Kings Ross Lonsberry; Eddie Shack
May 14, 1969	To Philadelphia Flyers cash	To St. Louis Blues Ron Buchanan
May 30, 1969	To Pittsburgh Penguins Forbes Kennedy	To Toronto Maple Leafs cash

1. Trade completed on May 7, 1969.

=== June ===
June, 1969 (exact date unknown)	To Minnesota North Stars 1st-round pick - 1969 Amateur Draft (# 5 - Dick Redmond)	To Montreal Canadiens future considerations^{2}
June 6, 1969	To Detroit Red Wings Garry Monahan; Doug Piper	To Montreal Canadiens Bart Crashley; Peter Mahovlich
June 6, 1969	To New York Rangers Don Blackburn; Leon Rochefort	To Philadelphia Flyers Reg Fleming
June 6, 1969	To Pittsburgh Penguins Craig Cameron; Ron Schock; 2nd-round pick - 1972 Amateur Draft (# 30 - Bernie Lukowich)	To St. Louis Blues Lou Angotti; 1st-round pick - 1971 Amateur Draft (# 4 - Gene Carr)
June 9, 1969	To Los Angeles Kings Dennis Hextall; Leon Rochefort	To New York Rangers Real Lemieux
June 10, 1969	To New York Rangers cash	To Oakland Seals Harry Howell
June 10, 1969	To New York Rangers 1st-round pick - 1969 Amateur Draft (# 8 - Andre Dupont)	To St. Louis Blues Phil Goyette
June 10, 1969	To Minnesota North Stars Bob Barlow	To Philadelphia Flyers cash
June 11, 1969	To Detroit Red Wings cash	To Montreal Canadiens Chuck Hamilton
June 12, 1969	To Montreal Canadiens cash	To Philadelphia Flyers Jean-Guy Gendron
June 12, 1969	To Los Angeles Kings cash	To Montreal Canadiens 6th-round pick - 1969 Amateur Draft (# 63 - Guy Delparte)
June 12, 1969	To New York Rangers cash	To St. Louis Blues 6th-round pick - 1969 Amateur Draft (# 70 - Dale Yutsyk)
June 12, 1969	To Pittsburgh Penguins cash	To St. Louis Blues 7th-round pick - 1969 Amateur Draft (# 73 - Bob Collyard)
June 12, 1969	To Los Angeles Kings cash	To Montreal Canadiens 7th-round pick - 1969 Amateur Draft (# 74 - Ian Wilkie)
June 12, 1969	To Montreal Canadiens 8th-round pick - 1969 Amateur Draft (# 79 - Frank Hamill)	To Pittsburgh Penguins cash
June 12, 1969	To Los Angeles Kings cash	To St. Louis Blues 8th-round pick - 1969 Amateur Draft (# 80 - Patrick Lange)
June 12, 1969	To Montreal Canadiens cash	To Philadelphia Flyers Jean Gauthier
June 17, 1969	To Detroit Red Wings Larry Jeffrey	To New York Rangers Terry Sawchuk; Sandy Snow
June 27, 1969	To New York Rangers cash	To St. Louis Blues Norm Beaudin; Camille Henry
June 27, 1969	To Montreal Canadiens Norm Beaudin; Bobby Schmautz	To St. Louis Blues Ernie Wakely

1. The Montreal Canadiens' first-round pick went to the Minnesota North Stars as the result of a trade where Minnesota promised Montreal that they would not draft Dick Duff in the 1969 intra-league draft.

=== September ===
September, 1969 (exact date unknown)	To Minnesota North Stars cash	To Montreal Canadiens Andre Pronovost

=== October ===
October, 1969 (exact date unknown)	To Buffalo Sabres cash	To St. Louis Blues Roger Lafreniere
October 28, 1969	To Detroit Red Wings Billy Dea	To Pittsburgh Penguins Mike McMahon Jr.

=== November ===
November, 1969 (exact date unknown)	To New York Rangers loan of Sheldon Kannegiesser for remainder of 1969–70 season	To St. Louis Blues loan of Larry Hornung for remainder of 1969–70 season
November 17, 1969	To Los Angeles Kings Jean Potvin; 2nd-round pick - 1970 Amateur Draft (# 24 - Al McDonough); 3rd-round pick - 1970 Amateur Draft (# 38 - Terry Holbrook)	To Montreal Canadiens 2nd-round pick - 1970 Amateur Draft (MIN - # 17 - Buster Harvey)^{1} 3rd-round pick - 1970 Amateur Draft (# 31 - Steve Carlyle); 4th-round pick - 1970 Amateur Draft (# 45 - Cal Hammond)

1. The Montreal Canadiens' second-round pick went to the Minnesota North Stars as the result of a trade on June 10, 1970 that sent Claude Larose to Montreal in exchange for Bobby Rousseau and this pick.

=== December ===
December 9, 1969	To Buffalo Sabres cash	To St. Louis Blues George Morrison
December 10, 1969	To Boston Bruins Wayne Carleton	To Toronto Maple Leafs Jim Harrison
December 15, 1969	To Chicago Black Hawks Gene Ubriaco	To Oakland Seals Howie Menard

=== January ===
January 23, 1970	To Los Angeles Kings Dick Duff	To Montreal Canadiens Dennis Hextall; 2nd-round pick - 1971 Amateur Draft (# 20 - Larry Robinson)

=== February ===
February, 1970 (exact date unknown)	To Los Angeles Kings Gary Marsh	To Toronto Maple Leafs Jacques Lemieux
February 20, 1970	To Detroit Red Wings Gary Croteau; Larry Johnston; Dale Rolfe	To Los Angeles Kings Brian Gibbons; Garry Monahan; Matt Ravlich
February 20, 1970	To Chicago Black Hawks Bryan Campbell; Gerry Desjardins; Bill White	To Los Angeles Kings Denis DeJordy; Gilles Marotte; Jim Stanfield
February 27, 1970	To Minnesota North Stars Gump Worsley	To Montreal Canadiens cash
February 28, 1970	To Los Angeles Kings Real Lemieux; Juha Widing	To New York Rangers Ted Irvine

=== March ===
March 3, 1970	To New York Rangers Tim Horton	To Toronto Maple Leafs future considerations (Denis Dupere)^{1}

1. Trade completed on May 14, 1970.

== Additional sources ==
- hockeydb.com - search for player and select "show trades"
- "NHL trades for 1969-1970". NHL Trade Tracker.
