= Doug Acomb =

Canadian ice hockey player

- Born: May 15, 1949 (age 75); Toronto, Ontario, Canada
- Height: 5 ft 11 in (180 cm)
- Weight: 165 lb (75 kg; 11 st 11 lb)
- Position: Left wing
- Shot: Left
- Played for: Toronto Maple Leafs; Wiener EV
- Playing career: 1969–1976

Douglas Raymond Acomb (born May 15, 1949) is a Canadian former professional ice hockey player. He played 2 games in the National Hockey League with the Toronto Maple Leafs during the 1969–70 season. The rest of his career, which lasted from 1969 to 1976, was mainly spent in the senior Ontario Hockey Association.

== Playing career ==
Acomb played two games in the NHL for the Toronto Maple Leafs managing one assist. He later played in amateur senior hockey for the Barrie Flyers.

== Post-retirement ==
He later lived in Markham, Ontario with his wife, four daughters, and two sons. He worked as a high school teacher and hockey coach.

== Career statistics ==
=== Regular season and playoffs ===
			Regular season					Playoffs
Season	Team	League	GP	G	A	Pts	PIM	GP	G	A	Pts	PIM
1965–66	York Steel	MetJBHL	40	26	32	58	—	—	—	—	—	—
1965–66	Toronto Marlboros	OHA	—	—	—	—	—	3	0	0	0	4
1966–67	Toronto Marlboros	OHA	43	20	18	38	41	17	11	9	20	22
1966–67	Toronto Marlboros	M-Cup	—	—	—	—	—	9	10	8	18	23
1967–68	Toronto Marlboros	OHA	52	22	44	66	51	5	2	3	5	4
1967–68	Toronto Marlboros	OHA Sr	1	2	1	3	0	—	—	—	—	—
1968–69	Toronto Marlboros	OHA	54	55	38	93	71	6	2	1	3	6
1969–70	Toronto Maple Leafs	NHL	2	0	1	1	0	—	—	—	—	—
1969–70	Tulsa Oilers	CHL	52	17	22	39	34	5	0	2	2	4
1969–70	Buffalo Bisons	AHL	—	—	—	—	—	2	0	0	0	0
1970–71	Phoenix Roadrunners	WHL	69	9	16	25	15	10	1	3	4	4
1971–72	Barrie Flyers	OHA Sr	39	37	41	78	53	18	15	7	22	6
1971–72	Barrie Flyers	Al-Cup	—	—	—	—	—	6	1	6	7	4
1972–73	Barrie Flyers	OHA Sr	40	34	39	73	34	—	—	—	—	—
1973–74	Barrie Flyers	OHA Sr	35	22	33	55	22	—	—	—	—	—
1973–74	Barrie Flyers	Al-Cup	—	—	—	—	—	6	3	2	5	9
1974–75	Wiener EV	AUT	25	27	16	43	75	—	—	—	—	—
1974–75	Port Huron Flags	IHL	6	3	5	8	2	5	2	7	9	4
1975–76	Barrie Flyers	OHA Sr	44	33	42	75	34	—	—	—	—	—
1975–76	Barrie Flyers	Al-Cup	—	—	—	—	—	4	1	3	4	4
OHA Sr totals			159	128	156	284	143	18	15	7	22	6
NHL totals			2	0	1	1	0	—	—	—	—	—
