= Nick Harbaruk =

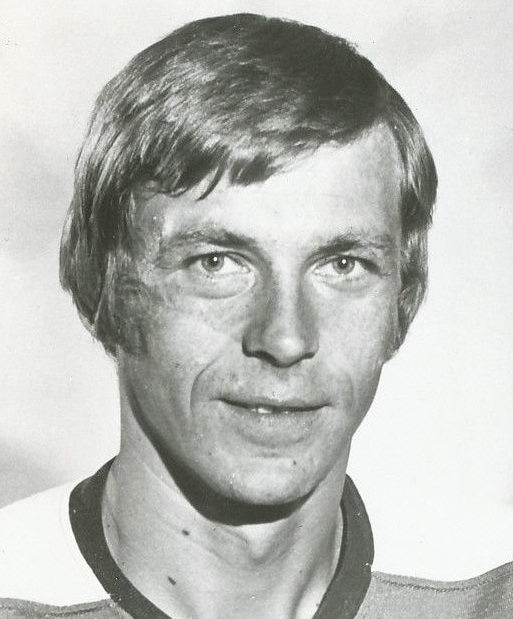
- Born: August 16, 1943 Drohiczyn, German Reich
- Died: March 10, 2011 (aged 67) Toronto, Ontario, Canada
- Height: 6 ft 0 in (183 cm)
- Weight: 195 lb (88 kg; 13 st 13 lb)
- Position: Right wing
- Shot: Right
- Played for: Pittsburgh Penguins; St. Louis Blues; Indianapolis Racers
- Playing career: 1969–1977

Mikołaj Nicholas "Nick" Harbaruk (August 16, 1943 – March 10, 2011) was a professional ice hockey player. Harbaruk played 364 games in the National Hockey League (NHL) and 181 in the World Hockey Association (WHA). Harbaruk played for the Pittsburgh Penguins, St. Louis Blues, and Indianapolis Racers.

== Biography ==
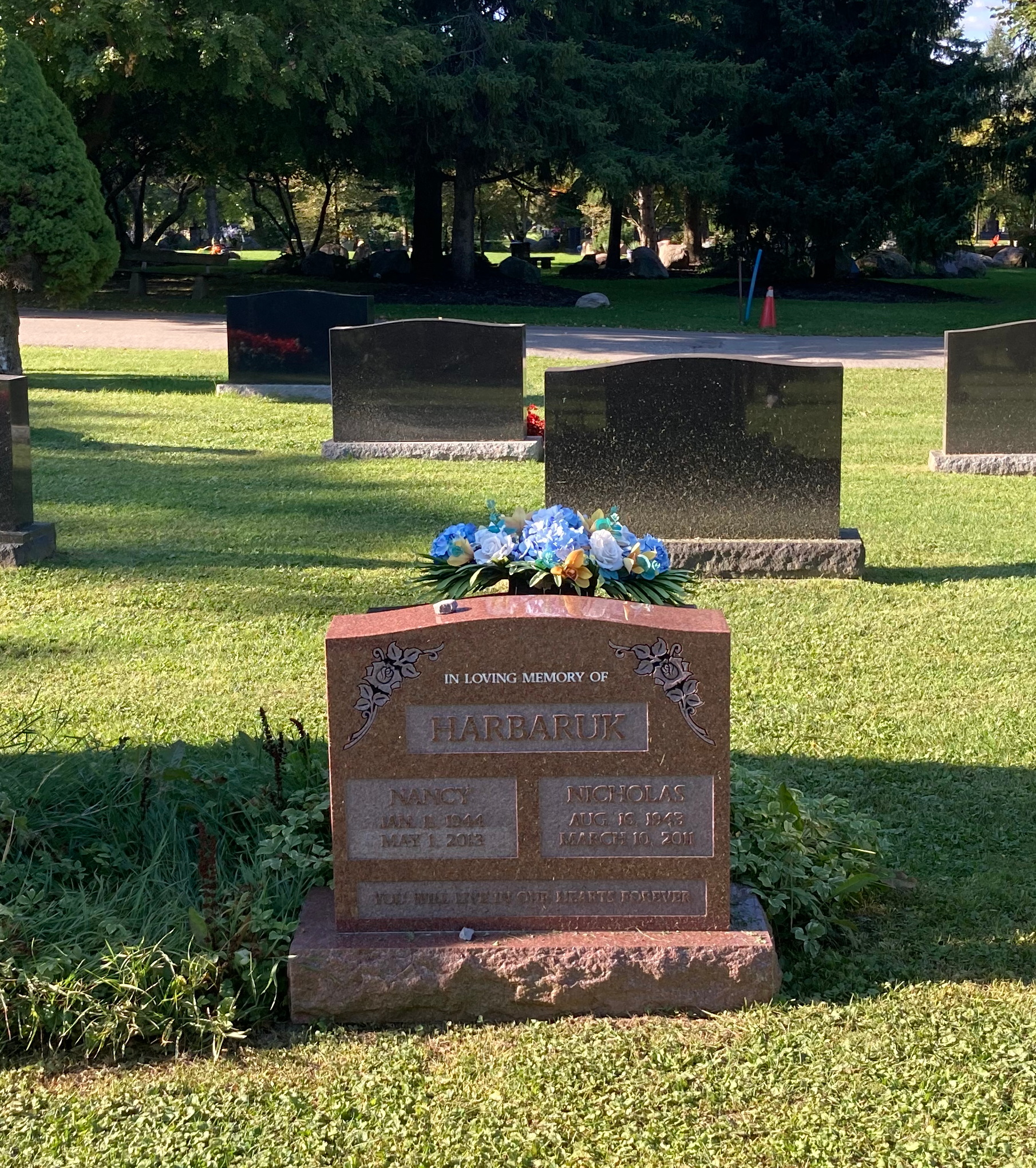
Harbaruk's grave at York Cemetery

Harbaruk was of Ukrainian descent, born in Poland and immigrated to Toronto, Ontario at the age of five. Harbaruk died from bone cancer on March 10, 2011, at the age of 67. He was buried at York Cemetery, Toronto. At the time of his death, he was survived by his wife, Nancy, and two daughters.

== Playing career ==
Prior to his NHL career, Harbaruk played three seasons with the Toronto Marlboros and helped the Marlies win the 1964 Memorial Cup. Harbaruk then spent five seasons with the Tulsa Oilers, a minor league affiliate of the Toronto Maple Leafs, where he got a college degree. Harbaruk was claimed by the Penguins in the 1969 Intra-league draft. Harbaruk played four seasons with the Penguins. In October 1973 he was traded to the St. Louis Blues. After one season with the Blues, Harbaruk then joined the WHA and spent 2-1/2 seasons with the Indianapolis Racers. Harbaruk also played in the minors with Vancouver Canucks, Oklahoma City Blazers, Pittsburgh Hornets and Rochester Americans. After retiring from active play, Harbaruk became the coach of Seneca College in Toronto.

== Career statistics ==
=== Regular season and playoffs ===
			Regular season					Playoffs
Season	Team	League	GP	G	A	Pts	PIM	GP	G	A	Pts	PIM
1960–61	Toronto Marlboros	OHA	36	4	8	12	0	—	—	—	—	—
1961–62	Toronto Marlboros	MetJAHL	31	7	10	17	0	—	—	—	—	—
1961–62	Pittsburgh Hornets	AHL	1	0	0	0	0	—	—	—	—	—
1962–63	Toronto Marlboros	MetJAHL	16	12	8	20	23	—	—	—	—	—
1963–64	Toronto Marlboros	OHA	54	15	25	40	71	—	—	—	—	—
1963–64	Toronto Marlboros	M-Cup	—	—	—	—	—	11	5	4	9	15
1964–65	Rochester Americans	AHL	2	0	0	0	0	—	—	—	—	—
1964–65	Tulsa Oilers	CHL	67	27	43	70	65	12	5	8	13	25
1965–66	Tulsa Oilers	CHL	70	20	46	66	97	11	1	4	5	10
1966–67	Tulsa Oilers	CHL	70	14	26	40	84	—	—	—	—	—
1967–68	Tulsa Oilers	CHL	54	20	30	50	96	11	1	6	7	14
1968–69	Tulsa Oilers	CHL	69	26	19	45	89	7	2	5	7	18
1968–69	Vancouver Canucks	WHL	3	1	1	2	2	—	—	—	—	—
1969–70	Pittsburgh Penguins	NHL	74	5	17	22	56	10	3	0	3	20
1970–71	Pittsburgh Penguins	NHL	78	13	12	25	108	—	—	—	—	—
1971–72	Pittsburgh Penguins	NHL	78	12	17	29	46	4	0	1	1	0
1972–73	Pittsburgh Penguins	NHL	78	10	15	25	47	—	—	—	—	—
1973–74	St. Louis Blues	NHL	56	5	14	19	16	—	—	—	—	—
1974–75	Indianapolis Racers	WHA	78	20	23	43	52	—	—	—	—	—
1975–76	Indianapolis Racers	WHA	76	23	19	42	26	7	2	0	2	10
1976–77	Oklahoma City Blazers	CHL	42	17	18	35	22	—	—	—	—	—
1976–77	Indianapolis Racers	WHA	27	2	2	4	2	6	1	1	2	0
WHA totals			181	45	44	89	80	13	3	1	4	10
NHL totals			364	45	75	120	273	14	3	1	4	20
