= 1969–70 Philadelphia Flyers season =

NHL hockey team season

1969–70 Philadelphia Flyers
- Division: 5th West
- 1969–70 record: 17–35–24
- Home record: 11–14–13
- Road record: 6–21–11
- Goals for: 197 (9th)
- Goals against: 225 (7th)

Team information
- General manager: Bud Poile (Oct.–Dec.); Keith Allen (Dec.–Apr.)
- Coach: Vic Stasiuk
- Captain: Ed Van Impe
- Alternate captains: Dick Cherry; Unknown
- Arena: Spectrum
- Average attendance: 13,372
- Minor league affiliates: Quebec Aces; Flint Generals; Jersey Devils

Team leaders
- Goals: Gary Dornhoefer (26)
- Assists: Andre Lacroix (36)
- Points: Andre Lacroix (58)
- Penalty minutes: Earl Heiskala (171)
- Plus/minus: Simon Nolet (+12)
- Wins: Bernie Parent (13)
- Goals against average: Bernie Parent (2.80)

The 1969–70 Philadelphia Flyers season was the franchise's third season in the National Hockey League (NHL). The Flyers missed the playoffs for the first time in franchise history, setting a team record for fewest wins and an NHL record for most ties.

== Off-season ==
On May 20, 1969, Keith Allen was named vice president and assistant general manager of the team and replaced as head coach by Vic Stasiuk. Stasiuk spent the previous two seasons as the head coach of the Quebec Aces, the Flyers American Hockey League affiliate.

The Flyers took a chance when they selected a 19-year-old diabetic from Flin Flon, Manitoba, named Bobby Clarke with their second draft pick, 17th overall, in the 1969 NHL amateur draft.

== Regular season ==
By the time training camp came around it was clear that Clarke was the best player on the team, and he quickly became a fan favorite. His 15 goals and 31 assists earned him a trip to the NHL All-Star Game.

On December 11, 1969, the Flyers introduced what became one of the team's best-known traditions: playing a recording of Kate Smith singing God Bless America instead of The Star-Spangled Banner before important games. The perception was that the team was more successful on these occasions, so the tradition grew. The move was initially done by Flyers promotion director Lou Scheinfeld as a way to defray national tensions at the time of the Vietnam War: Scheinfeld noticed that people regularly left their seats to walk around during the anthem, but showed more respect and often sang along to "God Bless America". To this day, the team plays the song before major playoff games, currently with Lauren Hart (daughter of Hall of Fame Flyers broadcast announcer Gene Hart) performing the first part of the song, a recording of Smith singing the second part, and Lauren Hart joining the recording for the finale. As of the close of the 2013–14 Flyers season, the Flyers have a record of 96–28–4 when God Bless America is sung prior to home games.

General manager Bud Poile was fired on December 19. Keith Allen was named his replacement on December 22.

The team struggled in 1969–70 recording a franchise worst (as of completion of the 2013–14 season) in wins (17). Even with such a bad output, the Flyers had a seven-point lead on the Oakland Seals with six games to play. However, the Flyers lost their last six games and Oakland made up the deficit. They lost the tiebreaker for the final playoff spot to Oakland, missing the playoffs for the first time.

=== Season standings ===
West Division
		GP	W	L	T	GF	GA	DIFF	Pts
1	St. Louis Blues	76	37	27	12	224	179	+45	86
2	Pittsburgh Penguins	76	26	38	12	182	238	−56	64
3	Minnesota North Stars	76	19	35	22	224	257	−33	60
4	Oakland Seals	76	22	40	14	169	243	−74	58
5	Philadelphia Flyers	76	17	35	24	197	225	−28	58
6	Los Angeles Kings	76	14	52	10	168	290	−122	38

=== Record vs. opponents ===
==== Vs. West Division ====
1969–70 NHL records
Team	LAK	MIN	OAK	PHI	PIT	STL	Total
Los Angeles	—	2–2–4	5–2–1	2–5–1	2–6	0–8	11–23–6
Minnesota	2–2–4	—	1–5–2	3–4–1	2–5–1	2–4–2	10–20–10
Oakland	2–5–1	5–2–1	—	2–3–3	3–2–3	2–4–2	14–16–10
Philadelphia	5–2–1	4–3–1	3–2–3	—	1–5–2	1–5–2	14–17–9
Pittsburgh	6–2	5–2–1	2–3–3	5–1–2	—	1–5–2	19–13–8
St. Louis	8–0	4–2–2	4–2–2	5–1–2	5–1–2	—	26–6–8

==== Vs. East Division ====
1969–70 NHL records
Team	BOS	CHI	DET	MTL	NYR	TOR	Total
Los Angeles	0–5–1	1–5	0–6	0–6	1–4–1	1–3–2	3–29–4
Minnesota	1–4–1	2–3–1	1–1–4	2–2–2	1–3–2	2–2–2	9–15–12
Oakland	0–5–1	3–3	2–4	2–3–1	1–5	1–4–1	9–24–3
Philadelphia	0–4–2	0–4–2	1–3–2	0–4–2	0–0–6	2–3–1	3–18–15
Pittsburgh	0–5–1	0–6	2–4	2–4	1–4–1	2–2–2	7–25–4
St. Louis	1–3–2	2–4	2–4	2–2–2	2–4	2–4	11–21–4

== Schedule and results ==
1969–70 regular season
October: 1–1–5, 7 points (home: 0–0–4; road: 1–1–1)

Game	Date	Score	Opponent	Decision	Record	Points	Recap
1	October 11	0–4	@ Minnesota North Stars	Parent	0–1–0	0	L
2	October 15	3–3	@ Pittsburgh Penguins	Favell	0–1–1	1	T
3	October 19	1–1	Montreal Canadiens	Parent	0–1–2	2	T
4	October 22	4–3	@ Toronto Maple Leafs	Parent	1–1–2	4	W
5	October 23	2–2	Detroit Red Wings	Parent	1–1–3	5	T
6	October 26	0–0	St. Louis Blues	Parent	1–1–4	6	T
7	October 30	3–3	New York Rangers	Parent	1–1–5	7	T

November: 2–7–4, 8 points (home: 2–2–3; road: 0–5–1)

Game	Date	Score	Opponent	Decision	Record	Points	Recap
8	November 1	0–8	@ St. Louis Blues	Parent	1–2–5	7	L
9	November 2	6–2	Minnesota North Stars	Parent	2–2–5	9	W
10	November 6	1–4	Montreal Canadiens	Parent	2–3–5	9	L
11	November 9	2–2	Oakland Seals	Parent	2–3–6	10	T
12	November 12	2–4	@ Minnesota North Stars	Parent	2–4–6	10	L
13	November 15	2–4	@ Toronto Maple Leafs	Parent	2–5–6	10	L
14	November 20	3–2	Los Angeles Kings	Parent	3–5–6	12	W
15	November 22	3–5	@ Pittsburgh Penguins	Parent	3–6–6	12	L
16	November 23	2–3	Toronto Maple Leafs	Favell	3–7–6	12	L
17	November 26	1–1	Detroit Red Wings	Parent	3–7–7	13	T
18	November 27	4–6	@ Boston Bruins	Favell	3–8–7	13	L
19	November 29	2–2	@ New York Rangers	Parent	3–8–8	14	T
20	November 30	3–3	Pittsburgh Penguins	Parent	3–8–9	15	T

December: 4–5–3, 11 points (home: 3–3–0; road: 1–2–3)

Game	Date	Score	Opponent	Decision	Record	Points	Recap
21	December 3	7–1	@ Los Angeles Kings	Parent	4–8–9	17	W
22	December 5	2–2	@ Oakland Seals	Parent	4–8–10	18	T
23	December 7	1–4	St. Louis Blues	Parent	4–9–10	18	L
24	December 11	6–3	Toronto Maple Leafs	Parent	5–9–10	20	W
25	December 13	3–5	Boston Bruins	Parent	5–10–10	20	L
26	December 14	1–4	@ Chicago Black Hawks	Favell	5–11–10	20	L
27	December 17	2–2	@ New York Rangers	Parent	5–11–11	21	T
28	December 20	0–3	@ St. Louis Blues	Parent	5–12–11	21	L
29	December 21	4–0	Pittsburgh Penguins	Parent	6–12–11	23	W
30	December 25	3–1	Oakland Seals	Favell	7–12–11	25	W
31	December 27	2–2	@ Montreal Canadiens	Parent	7–12–12	26	T
32	December 28	4–5	Boston Bruins	Parent	7–13–12	26	L

January: 5–6–5, 15 points (home: 3–3–2; road: 2–3–3)

Game	Date	Score	Opponent	Decision	Record	Points	Recap
33	January 1	3–4	@ Los Angeles Kings	Parent	7–14–12	26	L
34	January 3	1–6	Detroit Red Wings	Parent	7–15–12	26	L
35	January 4	3–1	Minnesota North Stars	Favell	8–15–12	28	W
36	January 7	2–2	@ St. Louis Blues	Favell	8–15–13	29	T
37	January 8	4–1	Los Angeles Kings	Parent	9–15–13	31	W
38	January 10	2–2	Oakland Seals	Parent	9–15–14	32	T
39	January 13	3–1	@ Oakland Seals	Favell	10–15–14	34	W
40	January 15	4–4	New York Rangers	Parent	10–15–15	35	T
41	January 17	3–5	@ Detroit Red Wings	Favell	10–16–15	35	L
42	January 18	4–6	Pittsburgh Penguins	Parent	10–17–15	35	L
43	January 22	3–3	@ Boston Bruins	Parent	10–17–16	36	T
44	January 24	6–0	@ Minnesota North Stars	Favell	11–17–16	38	W
45	January 25	2–0	St. Louis Blues	Parent	12–17–16	40	W
46	January 28	2–2	@ Chicago Black Hawks	Favell	12–17–17	41	T
47	January 29	3–4	@ Detroit Red Wings	Parent	12–18–17	41	L
48	January 31	0–5	Chicago Black Hawks	Favell	12–19–17	41	L

February: 3–6–3, 9 points (home: 2–2–1; road: 1–4–2)

Game	Date	Score	Opponent	Decision	Record	Points	Recap
49	February 1	2–5	Montreal Canadiens	Parent	12–20–17	41	L
50	February 5	1–5	@ Boston Bruins	Parent	12–21–17	41	L
51	February 7	4–4	@ Chicago Black Hawks	Favell	12–21–18	42	T
52	February 8	5–3	@ Detroit Red Wings	Parent	13–21–18	44	W
53	February 12	3–3	Toronto Maple Leafs	Parent	13–21–19	45	T
54	February 14	3–4	@ Toronto Maple Leafs	Parent	13–22–19	45	L
55	February 15	7–1	Los Angeles Kings	Parent	14–22–19	47	W
56	February 17	2–4	@ Pittsburgh Penguins	Parent	14–23–19	47	L
57	February 18	3–3	@ New York Rangers	Parent	14–23–20	48	T
58	February 21	3–5	@ Montreal Canadiens	Parent	14–24–20	48	L
59	February 26	2–3	Chicago Black Hawks	Wilson	14–25–20	48	L
60	February 28	6–2	Minnesota North Stars	Parent	15–25–20	50	W

March: 2–7–4, 8 points (home: 1–2–3; road: 1–5–1)

Game	Date	Score	Opponent	Decision	Record	Points	Recap
61	March 1	4–4	Los Angeles Kings	Parent	15–25–21	51	T
62	March 4	2–2	@ Minnesota North Stars	Parent	15–25–22	52	T
63	March 7	5–5	Boston Bruins	Parent	15–25–23	53	T
64	March 8	2–3	Chicago Black Hawks	Parent	15–26–23	53	L
65	March 12	2–4	@ St. Louis Blues	Parent	15–27–23	53	L
66	March 14	5–3	@ Los Angeles Kings	Parent	16–27–23	55	W
67	March 15	1–2	@ Oakland Seals	Parent	16–28–23	55	L
68	March 19	2–2	New York Rangers	Parent	16–28–24	56	T
69	March 21	0–2	@ Montreal Canadiens	Parent	16–29–24	56	L
70	March 22	3–2	Oakland Seals	Parent	17–29–24	58	W
71	March 25	2–3	@ Oakland Seals	Parent	17–30–24	58	L
72	March 26	2–3	@ Los Angeles Kings	Parent	17–31–24	58	L
73	March 28	1–2	Pittsburgh Penguins	Parent	17–32–24	58	L

April: 0–3–0, 0 points (home: 0–2–0; road: 0–1–0)

Game	Date	Score	Opponent	Decision	Record	Points	Recap
74	April 1	1–4	@ Pittsburgh Penguins	Parent	17–33–24	58	L
75	April 2	0–1	St. Louis Blues	Parent	17–34–24	58	L
76	April 4	0–1	Minnesota North Stars	Parent	17–35–24	58	L

Legend: W Win (2 points) L Loss (0 points) T Tie (1 point)

== Player statistics ==
=== Scoring ===
- Position abbreviations: C = Center; D = Defense; G = Goaltender; LW = Left wing; RW = Right wing

No.	Player	Pos	Regular season					
No.	Player	Pos	GP	G	A	Pts	+/-	PIM
7	Andre Lacroix	C	74	22	36	58	−6	14
12 (Note: Dornhoefer wore number 24 in the season opener.)	Gary Dornhoefer	RW	65	26	29	55	2	96
20	Jim Johnson	C	72	18	30	48	1	17
16	Bobby Clarke	C	76	15	31	46	1	68
11	Jean-Guy Gendron	LW	71	23	21	44	8	54
17	Simon Nolet	RW	56	22	22	44	12	36
10	Bill Sutherland	LW	51	15	17	32	−2	30
3	Larry Hillman	D	76	5	26	31	−9	73
9	Reg Fleming	LW	65	9	18	27	−4	134
24	Terry Ball	D	61	7	18	25	−7	20
8	Lew Morrison	RW	66	9	10	19	−3	19
15	Garry Peters	C	59	6	10	16	−9	69
19	Earl Heiskala	LW	65	8	7	15	−15	171
14	Joe Watson	D	54	3	11	14	0	28
23	Larry Hale	D	53	1	9	10	−4	28
2	Ed Van Impe	D	65	0	10	10	−1	117
6	Wayne Hillman	D	68	3	5	8	−9	69
5	Dick Cherry	D	68	3	4	7	−24	23
30	Bernie Parent	G	62	0	3	3		14
18	Rosaire Paiement	RW	9	1	1	2	−2	4
21	Dick Sarrazin	RW	18	1	1	2	−2	4
22	Serge Bernier	C	1	0	1	1	−1	0
21	Darryl Edestrand	D	2	0	0	0	−1	6
1	Doug Favell	G	15	0	0	0		2
4	Ralph MacSweyn	D	17	0	0	0	−7	4
1	Dunc Wilson	G	1	0	0	0		0

=== Goaltending ===
No.	Player	Regular season										
No.	Player	GP	GS	W	L	T	SA	GA	GAA	SV%	SO	TOI
30	Bernie Parent	62	62	13	29	20	2159	171	2.80	.921	3	3,668
1	Doug Favell	15	13	4	5	4	516	43	3.15	.917	1	818
1	Dunc Wilson	1	1	0	1	0	26	3	3.02	.885	0	60

== Awards and records ==
=== Awards ===
Type	Award/honor	Recipient	Ref
League (in-season)	NHL All-Star Game selection	Bobby Clarke	
League (in-season)	NHL All-Star Game selection	Bernie Parent	

=== Records ===
During the 1969–70 season, the Flyers set the NHL record for most ties in a season with 24. They also tied an NHL record for most home ties with 13. Their four consecutive ties at home from October 19 to October 30 set a team record. Their 17 wins on the season is the lowest total in franchise history while their six home wins on the season tied the mark set during the 1968–69 season. Goaltender Bernie Parent set franchise records for most losses (29, later tied by Antero Niittymaki during the 2006–07 season) and most ties (20).

=== Milestones ===
Milestone	Player	Date	Ref
First game	Bobby Clarke	October 11, 1969	
First game	Lew Morrison	October 11, 1969	

== Transactions ==
The Flyers were involved in the following transactions from May 5, 1969, the day after the deciding game of the 1969 Stanley Cup Final, through May 10, 1970, the day of the deciding game of the 1970 Stanley Cup Final.

=== Trades ===
Date	Details		Ref
May 14, 1969	To Philadelphia Flyers: cash	To St. Louis Blues: Ron Buchanan	
May 14, 1969	To Philadelphia Flyers: Wayne Hillman	To Minnesota North Stars: John Miszuk	
June 7, 1969	To Philadelphia Flyers: Reg Fleming	To New York Rangers: Don Blackburn; Leon Rochefort	
June 10, 1969	To Philadelphia Flyers: $30,000 cash; Future considerations	To Minnesota North Stars: Bob Barlow	
June 12, 1969	To Philadelphia Flyers: Jean-Guy Gendron	To Montreal Canadiens: 7th-round pick in 1969	

=== Players acquired ===
Date	Player	Former team	Via	Ref
June 10, 1969	Bob Barlow	Vancouver Canucks (WHL)	Inter-league draft	
June 11, 1969	Larry Hillman	Montreal Canadiens	Intra-league draft	
September 23, 1969	Jim Mair	Johnstown Jets (EHL)	Free agency	

=== Players lost ===
Date	Player	New team	Via	Ref
June 11, 1969	Jean-Guy Gendron	Montreal Canadiens	Intra-league draft	
June 12, 1969	Rene Drolet	Quebec Aces (AHL)	Reverse draft	
June 12, 1969	Jean Lapointe	Hershey Bears (AHL)	Reverse draft	
June 12, 1969	Roger Pelletier	Quebec Aces (AHL)	Reverse draft	
June 12, 1969	Bob Sneddon	Springfield Kings (AHL)	Reverse draft	
September 24, 1969	Allan Stanley		Retirement	

=== Signings ===
Date	Player	Term	Ref
July 24, 1969	Andre Lacroix	2-year	
August 21, 1969	Serge Bernier		
August 21, 1969	Gerry Meehan		
September 23, 1969	Michel Belhumeur		
October 1, 1969	Bobby Clarke		

== Draft picks ==
Philadelphia's picks at the 1969 NHL amateur draft, which was held at the Queen Elizabeth Hotel in Montreal, on June 11, 1969. During the draft, the Flyers traded their seventh-round pick, 75th overall, to the Montreal Canadiens in order to re-acquire Jean-Guy Gendron, who Montreal had selected from the Flyers earlier in the day during the inter-league draft.

Round	Pick	Player	Position	Nationality	Team (league)
1	6	Bob Currier	Center	Canada	Cornwall Royals (CJAHL)
2	17	Bobby Clarke	Center	Canada	Flin Flon Bombers (WCHL)
3	28	Willie Brossart	Defense	Canada	Estevan Bruins (WCHL)
4	40	Michel Belhumeur	Goaltender	Canada	Drummondville Rangers (QJHL)
5	52	Dave Schultz	Left wing	Canada	Sorel Eperviers (QJHL)
6	64	Don Saleski	Right wing	Canada	Regina Pats (SJHL)
8	81	Claude Chartre	Center	Canada	Drummondville Rangers (QJHL)

== Farm teams ==
The Flyers were affiliated with the Quebec Aces of the AHL, the Flint Generals of the IHL, and the Jersey Devils of the EHL.
