= Larry McIntyre =

Canadian ice hockey player (1949–2024)

- Born: July 13, 1949 Tisdale, Saskatchewan, Canada
- Died: November 29, 2024 (aged 75) Tulsa, Oklahoma, U.S.
- Height: 6 ft 1 in (185 cm)
- Weight: 190 lb (86 kg; 13 st 8 lb)
- Position: Defence
- Shot: Left
- Played for: Toronto Maple Leafs
- NHL draft: 31st overall, 1969; Toronto Maple Leafs
- Playing career: 1969–1976

Lawrence Albert McIntyre (July 13, 1949 – November 29, 2024) was a Canadian ice hockey defenceman. He played 41 games in the National Hockey League for the Toronto Maple Leafs between 1970 and 1973. The rest of his career lasted from 1969 to 1976 and was mainly spent in the Central Hockey League. McIntyre died in Tulsa, Oklahoma on November 29, 2024, at the age of 75.

== Career statistics ==
=== Regular season and playoffs ===
Season	Team	League	Regular season					Playoffs				
Season	Team	League	GP	G	A	Pts	PIM	GP	G	A	Pts	PIM
1966–67	Moose Jaw Canucks	CMJHL	32	0	3	3	9	10	0	0	0	2
1967–68	Moose Jaw Canucks	WCHL	60	7	13	20	66	10	0	3	3	4
1968–69	Moose Jaw Canucks	SJHL	4	1	6	7	4	—N/a	—N/a	—N/a	—N/a	—N/a
1969–70	Toronto Maple Leafs	NHL	1	0	0	0	0	—N/a	—N/a	—N/a	—N/a	—N/a
1969–70	Tulsa Oilers	CHL	60	2	12	14	41	6	0	0	0	4
1969–70	Buffalo Bisons	AHL	—N/a	—N/a	—N/a	—N/a	—N/a	1	0	0	0	0
1970–71	Tulsa Oilers	CHL	41	0	4	4	18	—N/a	—N/a	—N/a	—N/a	—N/a
1971–72	Tulsa Oilers	CHL	72	1	11	12	55	13	0	9	9	10
1972–73	Toronto Maple Leafs	NHL	40	0	3	3	26	—N/a	—N/a	—N/a	—N/a	—N/a
1972–73	Tulsa Oilers	CHL	14	0	8	8	20	—N/a	—N/a	—N/a	—N/a	—N/a
1973–74	Seattle Totems	WHL	52	2	14	16	32	—N/a	—N/a	—N/a	—N/a	—N/a
1974–75	Seattle Totems	CHL	68	2	13	15	50	—N/a	—N/a	—N/a	—N/a	—N/a
1975–76	Tulsa Oilers	CHL	76	7	29	36	36	9	1	3	4	6
CHL totals			331	12	77	89	220	28	1	12	13	20
NHL totals			41	0	3	3	26	—N/a	—N/a	—N/a	—N/a	—N/a
