= 1969–70 Minnesota North Stars season =

National Hockey League team season

1969–70 Minnesota North Stars
- Division: 3rd West
- 1969–70 record: 19–35–22
- Home record: 11–16–11
- Road record: 8–19–11
- Goals for: 224
- Goals against: 257

Team information
- General manager: Wren Blair
- Coach: Wren Blair; Charlie Burns
- Captain: Claude Larose
- Alternate captains: Ray Cullen; Leo Boivin
- Arena: Met Center

Team leaders
- Goals: Bill Goldsworthy (36)
- Assists: Tom Williams (52)
- Points: J. P. Parise (72)
- Penalty minutes: Barry Gibbs (182)
- Wins: Cesare Maniago (9)
- Goals against average: Gump Worsley (2.65)

The 1969–70 Minnesota North Stars season was the North Stars' third season.

Coached by Wren Blair (9–13–10) and Charlie Burns (10–22–12), the team compiled a record of 19–35–22 for 60 points, to finish the regular season third in the West Division. In the playoffs they lost the quarter-finals 4–2 to the St. Louis Blues.

== Regular season ==
=== Final standings ===
West Division
		GP	W	L	T	GF	GA	DIFF	Pts
1	St. Louis Blues	76	37	27	12	224	179	+45	86
2	Pittsburgh Penguins	76	26	38	12	182	238	−56	64
3	Minnesota North Stars	76	19	35	22	224	257	−33	60
4	Oakland Seals	76	22	40	14	169	243	−74	58
5	Philadelphia Flyers	76	17	35	24	197	225	−28	58
6	Los Angeles Kings	76	14	52	10	168	290	−122	38

=== Record vs. opponents ===
==== Vs. West Division ====
1969–70 NHL records
Team	LAK	MIN	OAK	PHI	PIT	STL	Total
Los Angeles	—	2–2–4	5–2–1	2–5–1	2–6	0–8	11–23–6
Minnesota	2–2–4	—	1–5–2	3–4–1	2–5–1	2–4–2	10–20–10
Oakland	2–5–1	5–2–1	—	2–3–3	3–2–3	2–4–2	14–16–10
Philadelphia	5–2–1	4–3–1	3–2–3	—	1–5–2	1–5–2	14–17–9
Pittsburgh	6–2	5–2–1	2–3–3	5–1–2	—	1–5–2	19–13–8
St. Louis	8–0	4–2–2	4–2–2	5–1–2	5–1–2	—	26–6–8

==== Vs. East Division ====
1969–70 NHL records
Team	BOS	CHI	DET	MTL	NYR	TOR	Total
Los Angeles	0–5–1	1–5	0–6	0–6	1–4–1	1–3–2	3–29–4
Minnesota	1–4–1	2–3–1	1–1–4	2–2–2	1–3–2	2–2–2	9–15–12
Oakland	0–5–1	3–3	2–4	2–3–1	1–5	1–4–1	9–24–3
Philadelphia	0–4–2	0–4–2	1–3–2	0–4–2	0–0–6	2–3–1	3–18–15
Pittsburgh	0–5–1	0–6	2–4	2–4	1–4–1	2–2–2	7–25–4
St. Louis	1–3–2	2–4	2–4	2–2–2	2–4	2–4	11–21–4

== Playoffs ==
By finishing the regular season in third place in the West Division, the Minnesota North Stars qualified for the Stanley Cup playoffs in 1970 and faced the first-place St. Louis Blues in a best-of-seven quarterfinal series. St. Louis won the first two games at home, 6–2 and 2–1. Minnesota won the next two games at home by scores of 4–2 and 4–0. The Blues won game five in St. Louis, 6–3, and also won game six in Minnesota, 4–2, to win the series in six games.

== Schedule and results ==
1969–70 regular season
October

Game	Result	Date	Score	Opponent	Record
1	W	October 11, 1969	4–0	Philadelphia Flyers (1969–70)	1–0–0
2	L	October 15, 1969	3–4	@ New York Rangers (1969–70)	1–1–0
3	W	October 16, 1969	3–2	@ Detroit Red Wings (1969–70)	2–1–0
4	L	October 18, 1969	2–4	@ St. Louis Blues (1969–70)	2–2–0
5	W	October 19, 1969	4–1	@ Chicago Black Hawks (1969–70)	3–2–0
6	L	October 22, 1969	2–3	Boston Bruins (1969–70)	3–3–0
7	L	October 25, 1969	1–4	Pittsburgh Penguins (1969–70)	3–4–0
8	W	October 29, 1969	4–1	Montreal Canadiens (1969–70)	4–4–0

November

Game	Result	Date	Score	Opponent	Record
9	L	November 1, 1969	3–6	@ Pittsburgh Penguins (1969–70)	4–5–0
10	L	November 2, 1969	2–6	@ Philadelphia Flyers (1969–70)	4–6–0
11	T	November 5, 1969	2–2	@ Montreal Canadiens (1969–70)	4–6–1
12	W	November 8, 1969	5–2	St. Louis Blues (1969–70)	5–6–1
13	W	November 12, 1969	4–2	Philadelphia Flyers (1969–70)	6–6–1
14	T	November 15, 1969	2–2	Detroit Red Wings (1969–70)	6–6–2
15	L	November 19, 1969	2–4	Oakland Seals (1969–70)	6–7–2
16	L	November 20, 1969	1–3	@ St. Louis Blues (1969–70)	6–8–2
17	W	November 22, 1969	4–1	Los Angeles Kings (1969–70)	7–8–2
18	T	November 26, 1969	4–4	Pittsburgh Penguins (1969–70)	7–8–3
19	L	November 29, 1969	2–5	@ Toronto Maple Leafs (1969–70)	7–9–3
20	T	November 30, 1969	2–2	@ New York Rangers (1969–70)	7–9–4

December

Game	Result	Date	Score	Opponent	Record
21	T	December 3, 1969	5–5	Toronto Maple Leafs (1969–70)	7–9–5
22	W	December 6, 1969	4–3	@ Montreal Canadiens (1969–70)	8–9–5
23	T	December 7, 1969	2–2	@ Boston Bruins (1969–70)	8–9–6
24	W	December 10, 1969	8–5	Chicago Black Hawks (1969–70)	9–9–6
25	T	December 11, 1969	2–2	@ Detroit Red Wings (1969–70)	9–9–7
26	L	December 13, 1969	2–5	New York Rangers (1969–70)	9–10–7
27	T	December 15, 1969	4–4	@ Los Angeles Kings (1969–70)	9–10–8
28	L	December 17, 1969	1–3	@ Oakland Seals (1969–70)	9–11–8
29	T	December 20, 1969	3–3	@ Los Angeles Kings (1969–70)	9–11–9
30	L	December 23, 1969	3–5	@ St. Louis Blues (1969–70)	9–12–9
31	T	December 25, 1969	4–4	Chicago Black Hawks (1969–70)	9–12–10
32	L	December 27, 1969	3–5	Oakland Seals (1969–70)	9–13–10
33	T	December 30, 1969	0–0	@ Los Angeles Kings (1969–70)	9–13–11

January

Game	Result	Date	Score	Opponent	Record
34	T	January 3, 1970	3–3	New York Rangers (1969–70)	9–13–12
35	L	January 4, 1970	1–3	@ Philadelphia Flyers (1969–70)	9–14–12
36	T	January 7, 1970	3–3	@ Toronto Maple Leafs (1969–70)	9–14–13
37	L	January 10, 1970	4–6	Los Angeles Kings (1969–70)	9–15–13
38	W	January 14, 1970	5–2	St. Louis Blues (1969–70)	10–15–13
39	T	January 15, 1970	1–1	@ Oakland Seals (1969–70)	10–15–14
40	L	January 17, 1970	1–3	New York Rangers (1969–70)	10–16–14
41	L	January 22, 1970	2–4	Montreal Canadiens (1969–70)	10–17–14
42	L	January 24, 1970	0–6	Philadelphia Flyers (1969–70)	10–18–14
43	L	January 25, 1970	1–4	Oakland Seals (1969–70)	10–19–14
44	L	January 28, 1970	4–5	@ Montreal Canadiens (1969–70)	10–20–14
45	L	January 29, 1970	5–6	@ Boston Bruins (1969–70)	10–21–14
46	L	January 31, 1970	2–4	Toronto Maple Leafs (1969–70)	10–22–14

February

Game	Result	Date	Score	Opponent	Record
47	L	February 1, 1970	4–7	@ Chicago Black Hawks (1969–70)	10–23–14
48	L	February 4, 1970	5–7	Pittsburgh Penguins (1969–70)	10–24–14
49	T	February 7, 1970	1–1	Montreal Canadiens (1969–70)	10–24–15
50	L	February 8, 1970	3–6	@ Pittsburgh Penguins (1969–70)	10–25–15
51	L	February 11, 1970	1–2	@ Oakland Seals (1969–70)	10–26–15
52	L	February 14, 1970	2–5	Chicago Black Hawks (1969–70)	10–27–15
53	T	February 15, 1970	3–3	St. Louis Blues (1969–70)	10–27–16
54	T	February 18, 1970	1–1	Detroit Red Wings (1969–70)	10–27–17
55	L	February 19, 1970	2–3	@ Chicago Black Hawks (1969–70)	10–28–17
56	L	February 21, 1970	2–4	Boston Bruins (1969–70)	10–29–17
57	T	February 25, 1970	3–3	Los Angeles Kings (1969–70)	10–29–18
58	L	February 28, 1970	2–6	@ Philadelphia Flyers (1969–70)	10–30–18

March

Game	Result	Date	Score	Opponent	Record
59	W	March 1, 1970	8–0	Toronto Maple Leafs (1969–70)	11–30–18
60	T	March 4, 1970	2–2	Philadelphia Flyers (1969–70)	11–30–19
61	W	March 7, 1970	8–3	@ Toronto Maple Leafs (1969–70)	12–30–19
62	T	March 8, 1970	2–2	@ Detroit Red Wings (1969–70)	12–30–20
63	L	March 11, 1970	1–9	St. Louis Blues (1969–70)	12–31–20
64	W	March 14, 1970	6–3	Pittsburgh Penguins (1969–70)	13–31–20
65	W	March 15, 1970	4–2	@ New York Rangers (1969–70)	14–31–20
66	T	March 17, 1970	5–5	@ St. Louis Blues (1969–70)	14–31–21
67	L	March 18, 1970	2–6	Detroit Red Wings (1969–70)	14–32–21
68	W	March 21, 1970	5–4	Boston Bruins (1969–70)	15–32–21
69	L	March 22, 1970	0–5	@ Boston Bruins (1969–70)	15–33–21
70	T	March 24, 1970	2–2	Oakland Seals (1969–70)	15–33–22
71	L	March 25, 1970	0–2	@ Pittsburgh Penguins (1969–70)	15–34–22
72	L	March 28, 1970	2–4	@ Los Angeles Kings (1969–70)	15–35–22
73	W	March 29, 1970	8–3	@ Oakland Seals (1969–70)	16–35–22
74	W	March 31, 1970	5–2	Los Angeles Kings (1969–70)	17–35–22

April

Game	Result	Date	Score	Opponent	Record
75	W	April 4, 1970	1–0	@ Philadelphia Flyers (1969–70)	18–35–22
76	W	April 5, 1970	5–1	@ Pittsburgh Penguins (1969–70)	19–35–22

Legend: Win (2 points) Loss (0 points) Tie (1 point)

=== Playoffs ===
1970 Stanley Cup playoffs
Quarterfinals vs. (1) St. Louis Blues – Blues win 4–2

Game	Result	Date	Score	Opponent	Series
1	L	April 8, 1970	2–6	@ St. Louis Blues	Blues lead 1–0
2	L	April 9, 1970	1–2	@ St. Louis Blues	Blues lead 2–0
3	W	April 11, 1970	4–2	St. Louis Blues	Blues lead 2–1
4	W	April 12, 1970	4–0	St. Louis Blues	Series tied 2–2
5	L	April 14, 1970	3–6	@ St. Louis Blues	Blues lead 3–2
6	L	April 16, 1970	2–4	St. Louis Blues	Blues lead 4–2

Legend: Win Loss

== Draft picks ==
Minnesota's draft picks at the 1968 NHL amateur draft held at the Queen Elizabeth Hotel in Montreal.

Round	#	Player	Nationality	College/Junior/Club team (League)
1	5	Dick Redmond	Canada	St. Catharines Black Hawks (OHA)
2	14	Dennis O'Brien	Canada	St. Catharines Black Hawks (OHA)
3	25	Gilles Gilbert	Canada	London Knights (OHA)
4	37	Fred O'Donnell	Canada	Oshawa Generals (OHA)
5	49	Pierre Jutras	Canada	Shawnigan Bruins (QMJHL)
6	61	Rob Walton	Canada	Niagara Falls Flyers (OHA)
7	72	Rick Thompson	Canada	Niagara Falls Flyers (OHA)
8	78	Cal Russell	Canada	Hamilton Red Wings (OHA)

== See also ==
- 1969–70 NHL season
