= Jacques Lemieux =

Canadian ice hockey player

- Born: April 8, 1943 (age 83) Matane, Quebec, Canada
- Height: 6 ft 2 in (188 cm)
- Weight: 190 lb (86 kg; 13 st 8 lb)
- Position: Defence
- Shot: Right
- Played for: Los Angeles Kings
- Playing career: 1963–1970

Jacques Leonard Lemieux (born April 8, 1943) is a Canadian former professional ice hockey player who played 19 games in the National Hockey League for the Los Angeles Kings between 1967 and 1969. He was selected in 15th round, 85th overall by the Kings in the 1967 NHL Expansion Draft. Lemieux was one of the players from the 1967 team that was honored before the Kings' first home game of the 2016–17 season.

== Career statistics ==
=== Regular season and playoffs ===
			Regular season					Playoffs
Season	Team	League	GP	G	A	Pts	PIM	GP	G	A	Pts	PIM
1963–64	Rouyn-Noranda Aluettes	NOHA	—	—	—	—	—	—	—	—	—	—
1963–64	Omaha Knights	CHL	2	0	0	0	0	—	—	—	—	—
1964–65	Rouyn-Noranda Aluettes	NOHA	—	—	—	—	—	—	—	—	—	—
1964–65	Omaha Knights	CHL	14	0	3	3	13	6	0	2	2	14
1965–66	Houston Apollos	CHL	70	7	19	26	59	—	—	—	—	—
1966–67	Cleveland Barons	AHL	68	6	30	36	47	5	0	2	2	6
1967–68	Los Angeles Kings	NHL	16	0	3	3	8	—	—	—	—	—
1968–69	Springfield Kings	AHL	51	4	31	35	6	—	—	—	—	—
1968–69	Denver Spurs	WHL	25	5	8	13	16	—	—	—	—	—
1968–69	Los Angeles Kings	NHL	—	—	—	—	—	1	0	0	0	0
1969–70	Los Angeles Kings	NHL	3	0	1	1	0	—	—	—	—	—
1969–70	Springfield Kings	AHL	7	0	0	0	2	—	—	—	—	—
1969–70	Denver Spurs	WHL	7	1	0	1	4	—	—	—	—	—
AHL totals			126	10	61	71	55	5	0	2	2	6
NHL totals			19	0	4	4	8	1	0	0	0	0
