= Gary Marsh (ice hockey) =

Canadian ice hockey player

- Born: March 9, 1946 (age 79); Toronto, Ontario, Canada
- Height: 5 ft 9 in (175 cm)
- Weight: 172 lb (78 kg; 12 st 4 lb)
- Position: Left wing
- Shot: Left
- Played for: Detroit Red Wings; Toronto Maple Leafs
- Playing career: 1966–1974

Gary Arthur Marsh (born March 9, 1946) is a Canadian former ice hockey left winger.

== Career ==
Marsh played seven games in the National Hockey League with the Detroit Red Wings and Toronto Maple Leafs during the 1967–68 and 1968–69 seasons. The rest of his career, which lasted from 1966 to 1964, was spent in various minor leagues.

== Career statistics ==
=== Regular season and playoffs ===
| | | | Regular season | | | | | Playoffs |
| Season | Team | League | GP | G | A | Pts | PIM | GP | G | A | Pts | PIM |
|---|---|---|---|---|---|---|---|---|---|---|---|---|
| 1962–63 | Hamilton Red Wings | OHA | 50 | 4 | 4 | 8 | 43 | 5 | 0 | 0 | 0 | 15 |
| 1963–64 | Hamilton Red Wings | OHA | 56 | 17 | 25 | 42 | 76 | — | — | — | — | — |
| 1964–65 | Hamilton Red Wings | OHA | 14 | 3 | 2 | 5 | 26 | — | — | — | — | — |
| 1964–65 | Etobicoke Indians | MetJBHL | — | — | — | — | — | — | — | — | — | — |
| 1965–66 | Hamilton Red Wings | OHA | 42 | 25 | 25 | 50 | 60 | 5 | 3 | 3 | 6 | 6 |
| 1965–66 | Memphis Wings | CHL | 4 | 1 | 1 | 2 | 4 | — | — | — | — | — |
| 1966–67 | Memphis Wings | CHL | 63 | 16 | 15 | 31 | 85 | 7 | 2 | 3 | 5 | 2 |
| 1967–68 | Detroit Red Wings | NHL | 6 | 1 | 3 | 4 | 4 | — | — | — | — | — |
| 1967–68 | Fort Worth Wings | CHL | 64 | 25 | 28 | 53 | 77 | 13 | 6 | 4 | 10 | 6 |
| 1968–69 | Toronto Maple Leafs | NHL | 1 | 0 | 0 | 0 | 0 | — | — | — | — | — |
| 1968–69 | Phoenix Roadrunners | WHL | 2 | 0 | 0 | 0 | 0 | — | — | — | — | — |
| 1968–69 | Rochester Americans | AHL | 7 | 1 | 2 | 3 | 4 | — | — | — | — | — |
| 1968–69 | Tulsa Oilers | CHL | 51 | 22 | 37 | 59 | 65 | 7 | 2 | 2 | 4 | 22 |
| 1969–70 | Phoenix Roadrunners | WHL | 45 | 8 | 16 | 24 | 17 | — | — | — | — | — |
| 1969–70 | Springfield Kings | AHL | 22 | 2 | 1 | 3 | 0 | 14 | 0 | 0 | 0 | 2 |
| 1970–71 | Springfield Kings | AHL | 26 | 2 | 4 | 6 | 6 | — | — | — | — | — |
| 1970–71 | Kansas City Blues | CHL | 19 | 2 | 8 | 10 | 4 | — | — | — | — | — |
| 1971–72 | Orillia Terriers | OHA Sr | 38 | 15 | 26 | 41 | 37 | — | — | — | — | — |
| 1972–73 | Orillia Terriers | OHA Sr | 39 | 12 | 15 | 27 | 33 | — | — | — | — | — |
| 1973–74 | Orillia Terriers | OHA Sr | 34 | 11 | 35 | 46 | 32 | — | — | — | — | — |
| CHL totals | | | 131 | 42 | 44 | 86 | 166 | 20 | 8 | 7 | 15 | 8 |
| NHL totals | | | 7 | 1 | 3 | 4 | 4 | — | — | — | — | — |
