= 1969–70 NHL season =

National Hockey League season

- League: National Hockey League
- Sport: Ice hockey
- Duration: October 11, 1969 – May 10, 1970
- Games: 76
- Teams: 12
- TV partner(s): CBC, CTV, SRC (Canada); CBS (United States)

Draft
- Top draft pick: Rejean Houle
- Picked by: Montreal Canadiens

Regular season
- Season champions: Chicago Black Hawks
- Season MVP: Bobby Orr (Bruins)
- Top scorer: Bobby Orr (Bruins)

Playoffs
- Playoffs MVP: Bobby Orr (Bruins)

Stanley Cup
- Champions: Boston Bruins
- Runners-up: St. Louis Blues

NHL seasons
- 1968–69 1970–71

The 1969–70 NHL season was the 53rd season of the National Hockey League. For the third straight season, the St. Louis Blues reached the Stanley Cup Final, and for the third straight year, the winners of the expansion West Division were swept four games to none. This time, however, it was at the hands of the Boston Bruins, as the defending champions Montreal Canadiens narrowly missed the playoffs, something that did not happen again for the next quarter century. With both the Canadiens and Toronto Maple Leafs missing the 1970 Stanley Cup playoffs, it was the first time in league history that no Canadian team in the NHL (two Canadian teams at the time) qualified for the playoffs (something that has happened only once since, in 2016, when all seven NHL's Canadian teams missed the playoffs). It was also the final season that teams wore their colored jerseys at home until the 2003–04 season.

== Amateur draft ==
The 1969 NHL amateur draft was held on June 12 at the Queen Elizabeth Hotel in Montreal, Quebec. Rejean Houle was selected first overall by the Montreal Canadiens.

== Regular season ==
Detroit owner Bruce Norris installed a phone at the Red Wing bench connected to his at his seat in the Olympia. When coach Bill Gadsby saw the phone, he ordered it removed. Gadsby was fired after three games

Bobby Orr of the Boston Bruins became the first (and to date, the only) defenceman in NHL history to win the league scoring championship. He did it by setting a new record for assists with 87 and totalling 120 points, only six shy of the point record set the previous season by teammate Phil Esposito. Along the way, he also won the Norris Trophy for the third straight year as the top defenceman, the Hart Trophy for league MVP, and the Conn Smythe Trophy for the playoff MVP, being the only player in the NHL to win four individual awards in a single season.

Gordie Howe finished the season within the ten leading NHL point scorers for an all-time record of 21 consecutive seasons; it was the final season he did so.

For the second straight season, the St. Louis Blues easily won the West Division, being the only team in the division to have a winning record.

The East Division, however, saw a temporary changing of the guard, as Montreal dropped from first the previous season to fifth, missing the playoffs on the total goals scored tie-breaker with the New York Rangers. The Rangers were in first place for a time, but injuries on the blueline doomed any hope of a first-place finish, and they even obtained Tim Horton in desperation. It was the only season Montreal failed to make the playoffs between 1948 and 1995, and as the Toronto Maple Leafs also failed to make the postseason, this was the first playoffs in NHL history to feature no Canadian teams. These developments were instrumental in the decision to move Chicago to the West Division in conjunction with the 1970 expansion, and the adoption of "crossover" playoff series between East and West Division teams the following season. The division crossover kept the newer expansion teams out of the Stanley Cup Final for the next three seasons. The Bruins and the Black Hawks both tied for the lead in the East (and entire league) with 99 points, but Chicago was awarded first place because they had five more wins. It was Chicago's second first-place finish in team history (the first being 1966–67).

=== Canadiens/Rangers tiebreaker ===
The last two playoff berths in the East Division were contested by three teams entering the final weekend of the season. The Detroit Red Wings were in third place with 93 points, followed by the Montreal Canadiens with 92 and the New York Rangers with 90. The Red Wings captured the third seed with a 6–2 win over the Rangers on Saturday night. The Canadiens needed just one victory to clinch the fourth and final berth. A New York win and a Montreal loss in their final games would give each team identical 38–22–16 records. At that time, the next tiebreaker was goals scored, in which the Canadiens held a 242–237 advantage. The Rangers had to outscore the Canadiens by at least five goals in order to qualify for the postseason. Scoring for the Blueshirts started early and often, leading 4-1 after the first period and 7-3 after two periods. Up 9-3 late in the third period, the Rangers pulled goaltender Eddie Giacomin in an attempt to pile on more goals and to pad the overall goal scoring lead, but instead surrendered two goals to Detroit. After the final buzzer, the Rangers peppered Red Wings goaltender Crozier with a franchise-record 65 shots on goal en route to a 9–5 triumph and a four-goal lead over Montreal.

Later that evening, the Canadiens either had to win, or score at least five goals in defeat, but were up against a Black Hawks team needing a victory to clinch top seed in the divisional playoffs. With Montreal trailing 5–2 and desperate for three more goals with 9:16 remaining in the third period, coach Claude Ruel pulled netminder Rogie Vachon for an extra attacker. Instead, the Canadiens surrendered five empty-net goals in a 10–2 defeat and missed the postseason for the only time within a 46-season span from 1949 to 1994. Montreal's Yvan Cournoyer commented on the Red Wings' effort in the afternoon, bitterly stating, "Those guys have no pride."

=== Final standings ===
East Division
		GP	W	L	T	GF	GA	DIFF	Pts
1	Chicago Black Hawks	76	45	22	9	250	170	+80	99
2	Boston Bruins	76	40	17	19	277	216	+61	99
3	Detroit Red Wings	76	40	21	15	246	199	+47	95
4	New York Rangers	76	38	22	16	246	189	+57	92
5	Montreal Canadiens	76	38	22	16	244	201	+43	92
6	Toronto Maple Leafs	76	29	34	13	222	242	−20	71

West Division
		GP	W	L	T	GF	GA	DIFF	Pts
1	St. Louis Blues	76	37	27	12	224	179	+45	86
2	Pittsburgh Penguins	76	26	38	12	182	238	−56	64
3	Minnesota North Stars	76	19	35	22	224	257	−33	60
4	Oakland Seals	76	22	40	14	169	243	−74	58
5	Philadelphia Flyers	76	17	35	24	197	225	−28	58
6	Los Angeles Kings	76	14	52	10	168	290	−122	38

== Playoffs ==
=== Playoff bracket ===
The top four teams in each division qualified for the playoffs. In the quarterfinals, the third seeded team in each division played against the division winner from their division. The other series matched the second and fourth place teams from the divisions. The two winning teams from each division's first round series then met in the Stanley Cup Semifinals. The two winners of the Semifinals then advanced to the Stanley Cup Final.

In each round, teams competed in a best-of-seven series (scores in the bracket indicate the number of games won in each best-of-seven series).

Quarterfinals
1	Chicago	4
3	Detroit	0
East Division
2	Boston	4
4	New York	2
1	St. Louis	4
3	Minnesota	2
West Division
2	Pittsburgh	4
4	Oakland	0

Semifinals
1	Chicago	0
2	Boston	4
1	St. Louis	4
2	Pittsburgh	2

Stanley Cup Finals
E2	Boston	4
W1	St. Louis	0

=== Quarterfinals ===
==== (E1) Chicago Black Hawks vs. (E3) Detroit Red Wings ====
The Chicago Black Hawks finished as the NHL's best regular season team with 99 points. Detroit finished third in the East Division with 95 points. This was the ninth playoff meeting between these two teams, and they split their eight previous meetings. They last met in the 1966 semifinals which Detroit won in six games. These teams each won four games of their eight-game regular season series.

In the Chicago-Detroit series, the Black Hawks swept the series, winning all four games by 4–2 scores.

April 8	Detroit Red Wings	2–4	Chicago Black Hawks	Chicago Stadium	Recap
Wayne Connelly (1) – pp – 02:59		First period	17:14 – pp – Pit Martin (1)
No scoring		Second period	07:23 – pp – Stan Mikita (1); 18:35 – sh – Chico Maki (1)
Gordie Howe (1) – 08:43		Third period	19:31 – en – Eric Nesterenko (1)
Roy Edwards 40 saves / 43 shots		Goalie stats	Tony Esposito 34 saves / 36 shots

April 9	Detroit Red Wings	2–4	Chicago Black Hawks	Chicago Stadium	Recap
Pete Stemkowski (1) – sh – 13:01		First period	14:38 – Jim Pappin (1)
No scoring		Second period	01:33 – Bobby Hull (1)
Bruce MacGregor (1) – 09:42		Third period	15:20 – pp – Pit Martin (2); 18:42 – Dennis Hull (1)
Roy Edwards 30 saves / 34 shots		Goalie stats	Tony Esposito 31 saves / 33 shots

April 11	Chicago Black Hawks	4–2	Detroit Red Wings	Olympia Stadium	Recap
Bobby Hull (2) – 06:37		First period	No scoring
Bobby Hull (3) – 11:03; Stan Mikita (2) – pp – 14:38		Second period	02:03 – Nick Libett (1)
Doug Jarrett (1) – en – 19:57		Third period	11:07 – Doug Volmar (1)
Tony Esposito 41 saves / 43 shots		Goalie stats	Roy Edwards 25 saves / 28 shots

April 12	Chicago Black Hawks	4–2	Detroit Red Wings	Olympia Stadium	Recap
Jim Pappin (2) – 04:32; Stan Mikita (3) – 12:14		First period	09:31 – pp – Gordie Howe (2)
Dennis Hull (2) – 04:43		Second period	14:16 – pp – Nick Libett (2)
Chico Maki (2) – 11:26		Third period	No scoring
Tony Esposito 29 saves / 31 shots		Goalie stats	Roy Edwards 11 saves / 14 shots Roger Crozier 15 saves / 16 shots

Chicago won series 4–0

==== (E2) Boston Bruins vs. (E4) New York Rangers ====
The Boston Bruins finished second in the East Division, earning 99 points. The New York Rangers earned 92 points to finish fourth in the East. This was the seventh playoff meeting between these two teams, with Boston winning four of their six previous meetings. They last met in the 1958 semifinals which Boston won in six games. These teams each won four games of their eight-game regular season series.

The Bruins clobbered the Rangers 8–2 in game one; Ranger coach Emile Francis replaced Ed Giacomin when the score reached 7–1, in favor of Terry Sawchuk. Sawchuk replaced Giacomin as the starter in game two, but Boston won 5–3.

Game three at Madison Square Garden featured a hostile crowd, with the New York fans booing, shouting obscenities and throwing objects at the Boston players. Giacomin – back in goal for the Rangers – reportedly told Bruin Derek Sanderson "We're being paid to get you tonight." A subsequent brawl erupted into both benches clearing, as well as fans littering the ice with debris; it took 19 minutes to play the first 91 seconds of the game. By the end of the Rangers' 4–3 win, the teams had set a new NHL playoff record for penalties (38) and penalty minutes (174).

Game four had Rod Gilbert score two goals in a 4–2 Ranger win. Giacomin was brilliant in goal for the Rangers and one of the highlights was stopping Derek Sanderson on a shorthanded breakaway. Game five was won by Boston 3–2 as Esposito scored two goals. Bobby Orr set up the winner when he stole a pass at center ice when the Rangers were caught on a line change. Game six was won easily by the Bruins and featured another display of fan abuse. Bobby Orr scored two goals, including the winner. Fans threw eggs and ball bearings on the ice, and when the outcome was no longer in doubt, set fires in the mezzanine of Madison Square Garden.

April 8	New York Rangers	2–8	Boston Bruins	Boston Garden	Recap
Jack Egers (1) – 19:00		First period	03:51 – Phil Esposito (1); 09:32 – pp – Phil Esposito (2)
No scoring		Second period	04:56 – Bobby Orr (1); 07:35 – sh – Bobby Orr (2); 08:19 – sh – Derek Sanderson (1); 11:44 – pp – Phil Esposito (3); 15:07 – Wayne Cashman (1)
Bob Nevin (1) – pp – 15:31		Third period	02:20 – pp – Fred Stanfield (1)
Eddie Giacomin 19 saves / 26 shots Terry Sawchuck 7 saves / 8 shots		Goalie stats	Gerry Cheevers 36 saves / 38 shots

April 9	New York Rangers	3–5	Boston Bruins	Boston Garden	Recap
Jack Egers (2) – 13:15; Rod Gilbert (1) – pp – 17:15		First period	07:06 – Jim Lorentz (1)
No scoring		Second period	05:39 – John McKenzie (1); 19:14 – Johnny Bucyk (1)
Tim Horton (1) – 06:38		Third period	01:24 – Ken Hodge (1); 03:40 – Ed Westfall (1)
Terry Sawchuck 34 saves / 39 shots		Goalie stats	Gerry Cheevers 29 saves / 32 shots

April 11	Boston Bruins	3–4	New York Rangers	Madison Square Garden	Recap
Bill Speer (1) – 09:31		First period	13:07 – Jean Ratelle (1); 14:24 – pp – Walt Tkaczuk (1)
No scoring		Second period	13:48 – pp – Rod Gilbert (2)
Bobby Orr (3) – pp – 05:59; Fred Stanfield (2) – 12:07		Third period	02:43 – Ted Irvine (1)
Gerry Cheevers 39 saves / 43 shots		Goalie stats	Ed Giacomin 26 saves / 29 shots

April 12	Boston Bruins	2–4	New York Rangers	Madison Square Garden	Recap
No scoring		First period	03:49 – pp – Rod Gilbert (3); 05:00 – Rod Gilbert (4)
Phil Esposito (4) – 11:30		Second period	11:51 – Dave Balon (1)
Bobby Orr (4) – pp – 08:41		Third period	11:16 – Walt Tkaczuk (2)
Eddie Johnston 35 saves / 39 shots		Goalie stats	Eddie Giacomin 23 saves / 25 shots

April 14	New York Rangers	2–3	Boston Bruins	Boston Garden	Recap
Jack Egers (3) – pp – 05:18		First period	02:44 – Bobby Orr (5)
Orland Kurtenbach (1) – 09:49		Second period	No scoring
No scoring		Third period	02:20 – Phil Esposito (5); 07:59 – Phil Esposito (6)
Eddie Giacomin 25 saves / 28 shots Terry Sawchuck 0 saves / 0 shots		Goalie stats	Gerry Cheevers 28 saves /30 shots

April 16	Boston Bruins	4–1	New York Rangers	Madison Square Garden	Recap
No scoring		First period	11:51 – pp – Brad Park (1)
Bobby Orr (6) – pp – 02:48; Wayne Cashman (2) – 04:56		Second period	No scoring
Bobby Orr (7) – 03:09; Derek Sanderson (2) – 07:22		Third period	No scoring
Gerry Cheevers 33 saves / 34 shots		Goalie stats	Eddie Giacomin 22 saves / 26 shots

Boston won series 4–2

==== (W1) St. Louis Blues vs. (W3) Minnesota North Stars ====
The St. Louis Blues finished first in the West Division with 86 points. The Minnesota North Stars earned 60 points to finish third in the West. This was the second playoff meeting between these two teams. Their only previous meeting was in the 1968 semi-finals which St. Louis won in seven games. St. Louis won this year's eight-game regular season series, earning ten of sixteen points.

The St. Louis Blues ousted the Minnesota North Stars in six games, with the home team winning the first five. The Blues won the first two games at the St. Louis Arena. Game three at the Metropolitan Sports Center featured Gump Worsley's sharp goaltending and Bill Goldsworthy scoring two goals in a 4–2 win for the North Stars. Cesare Maniago played in goal for Minnesota in game four and picked up a 4–0 shutout, tying the series. Game five at St. Louis Arena was tied 3–3 when St Louis scored three goals in the third period by Red Berenson, Terry Gray, and Jim Roberts and the Blues won 6–3. In game six, Ab McDonald scored two goals as the Blues eliminated the North Stars by a score of 4–2.

April 8	Minnesota North Stars	2–6	St. Louis Blues	St. Louis Arena	Recap
No scoring		First period	02:29 – pp – Ab McDonald (1); 05:41 – pp – Red Berenson (1); 16:50 – Gary Sabourin (1)
Bill Goldsworthy (1) – pp – 00:19		Second period	02:00 – Terry Crisp (1)
J. P. Parise (1) – pp – 10:55		Third period	00:33 – Ab McDonald (2); 05:20 – Terry Crisp (2)
Gump Worsley 40 saves / 46 shots		Goalie stats	Jacques Plante 19 saves / 21 shots

April 9	Minnesota North Stars	1–2	St. Louis Blues	St. Louis Arena	Recap
No scoring		First period	03:49 – Gary Sabourin (2); 17:28 – pp – Phil Goyette (1)
No scoring		Second period	No scoring
Bob Barlow (1) – 14:20		Third period	No scoring
Cesare Maniago 38 saves / 40 shots		Goalie stats	Jacques Plante 17 saves / 18 shots

April 11	St. Louis Blues	2–4	Minnesota North Stars	Met Center	Recap
No scoring		First period	04:58 – Tom Polanic (1); 15:23 – Danny O'Shea (1)
Ab McDonald (3) – 01:34		Second period	No scoring
Red Berenson (2) – pp – 03:15		Third period	08:16 – Bill Goldsworthy (2); 16:00 – pp – Bill Goldsworthy (3)
Ernie Wakely 27 saves / 31 shots		Goalie stats	Gump Worsley 32 saves / 34 shots

April 12	St. Louis Blues	0–4	Minnesota North Stars	Met Center	Recap
No scoring		First period	No scoring
No scoring		Second period	07:38 – pp – Bill Goldsworthy (4); 16:54 – Claude Larose (1)
No scoring		Third period	00:58 – Tommy Williams (1); 02:12 – pp – Bob Barlow (2)
Glenn Hall 34 saves / 34 shots		Goalie stats	Cesare Maniago 31 saves / 35 shots

April 14	Minnesota North Stars	3–6	St. Louis Blues	St. Louis Arena	Recap
J. P. Parise (2) – 01:38; J. P. Parise (3) – pp – 08:46		First period	04:38 – pp – Tim Ecclestone (1)
No scoring		Second period	06:32 – pp – Larry Keenan (1); 17:35 – Gary Sabourin (3)
Charlie Burns (1) – 09:06		Third period	02:37 – Terry Gray (1); 05:31 – Jim Roberts (1); 07:08 – sh – Red Berenson (3)
Gump Worsley 31 saves / 37 shots		Goalie stats	Glenn Hall 18 saves / 21 shots

April 16	St. Louis Blues	4–2	Minnesota North Stars	Met Center	Recap
Ab McDonald (4) – pp – 07:42		First period	04:35 – pp – Barry Gibbs (1)
Ab McDonald (5) – pp – 10:17; Red Berenson (4) – pp – 11:04		Second period	14:54 – Ray Cullen (1)
Larry Keenan (2) – 02:53		Third period	No scoring
Glenn Hall 32 saves / 34 shots		Goalie stats	Cesare Maniago 23 saves / 27 shots

St. Louis won series 4–2

==== (W2) Pittsburgh Penguins vs. (W4) Oakland Seals ====
Pittsburgh finished second in the West Division, earning 64 points. Oakland earned 58 points to finish fourth in the West. This was the first and only series between these two teams. Oakland won this year's eight-game regular season series, earning nine of sixteen points.

In game one, Nick Harbaruk's goal midway through the third period was the winner as Pittsburgh won 2–1. In game two, Gary Jarrett gave Oakland a 1–0 lead, but Pittsburgh came back to win 3–1. Game three at Oakland featured a hat trick by Ken Schinkel of the Penguins as Pittsburgh won 5–2. Game four saw Oakland holding 1–0 and 2–1 leads, but the Seals just couldn't hold on and the game was tied 2–2 at the end of regulation time, with Michel Briere scoring the series winning goal at 8:28 of overtime for Pittsburgh. It was the final time the Seals made the playoffs. The Stanley Cup playoffs did not return to the Bay Area until 1994 when the San Jose Sharks made the playoffs for the first time. This also marks only the second of three times ever a team in any of the four North American major sports have swept a team in their first playoff series.

April 8	Oakland Seals	1–2	Pittsburgh Penguins	Civic Arena	Recap
Gerry Ehman (1) – pp – 09:26		First period	01:05 – pp – Jean Pronovost (1)
No scoring		Second period	No scoring
No scoring		Third period	12:47 – Nick Harbaruk (1)
Gary Smith 34 saves / 35 shots		Goalie stats	Les Binkley 28 saves / 29 shots

April 9	Oakland Seals	1–3	Pittsburgh Penguins	Civic Arena	Recap
Gary Jarrett (1) – pp – 07:13		First period	No scoring
No scoring		Second period	11:00 – Nick Harbaruk (2); 11:34 – Wally Boyer (1)
No scoring		Third period	11:41 – Dunc McCallum (1)
Gary Smith 39 saves / 42 shots		Goalie stats	Les Binkley 25 saves / 26 shots

April 11	Pittsburgh Penguins	5–2	Oakland Seals	Oakland–Alameda County Coliseum Arena	Recap
No scoring		First period	03:29 – sh – Earl Ingarfield (1)
Nick Harbaruk (3) – 05:20; Ken Schinkel (1) – 07:58; Jean Pronovost (2) – 11:38		Second period	No scoring
Ken Schinkel (2) – pp – 09:33; Ken Schinkel (3) – 14:09		Third period	02:22 – Ted Hampson (1)
Les Binkley 27 saves / 29 shots		Goalie stats	Gary Smith 20 saves / 25 shots

April 12	Pittsburgh Penguins	3–2	OT	Oakland Seals	Oakland–Alameda County Coliseum Arena	Recap
Dean Prentice (1) – 07:37		First period		02:34 – pp – Carol Vadnais (1)
Bob Woytowich (1) – 06:22		Second period		04:34 – pp – Carol Vadnais (2)
No scoring		Third period		No scoring
Michel Briere (1) – 08:28		First overtime period		No scoring
Les Binkley 27 saves / 29 shots		Goalie stats		Gary Smith 28 saves / 31 shots

Pittsburgh won series 4–0

=== Semifinals ===
==== (E1) Chicago Black Hawks vs. (E2) Boston Bruins ====
This was the third meeting between these two teams with Boston winning both of their meetings. They last met in the 1942 quarter-finals where Boston won the best-of-three series in three games. These two teams split their eight-game regular season series, each earning eight points.

Boston beat Chicago in four straight games to win the East Division final for the first time.

April 19	Boston Bruins	6–3	Chicago Black Hawks	Chicago Stadium	Recap
Phil Esposito (7) – 12:28; Phil Esposito (8) – pp – 16:01		First period	No scoring
Johnny Bucyk (2) – 05:11; Phil Esposito (9) – pp – 14:59		Second period	08:26 – Dennis Hull (3); 17:00 – pp – Jim Pappin (3)
John McKenzie (2) – 01:00; Ken Hodge (2) – 08:45		Third period	10:39 – pp – Stan Mikita (4)
Gerry Cheevers 32 saves / 35 shots		Goalie stats	Tony Esposito 24 saves / 30 shots

April 21	Boston Bruins	4–1	Chicago Black Hawks	Chicago Stadium	Recap
Bobby Orr (8) – 05:08		First period	No scoring
John McKenzie (3) – 10:32; Don Marcotte (1) – 13:09		Second period	No scoring
Phil Esposito (10) – 02:18		Third period	05:02 – Bill White (1)
Gerry Cheevers 22 saves / 23 shots		Goalie stats	Tony Esposito 28 saves / 32 shots

April 23	Chicago Black Hawks	2–5	Boston Bruins	Boston Garden	Recap
Cliff Koroll (1) – 06:33; Pit Martin (3) – 19:45		First period	08:50 – Wayne Carleton (1)
No scoring		Second period	03:28 – pp – Johnny Bucyk (3); 06:17 – Wayne Cashman (3); 13:07 – pp – Johnny Bucyk (4)
No scoring		Third period	19:39 – en – Phil Esposito (11)
Tony Esposito 28 saves / 32 shots		Goalie stats	Gerry Cheevers 25 saves / 27 shots

April 26	Chicago Black Hawks	4–5	Boston Bruins	Boston Garden	Recap
No scoring		First period	13:14 – sh – Don Marcotte (2); 17:00 – pp – Johnny Bucyk (5)
Keith Magnuson (1) – 05:07; Dennis Hull (4) – 09:20; Dennis Hull (5) – 13:10		Second period	15:40 – Fred Stanfield (3)
Bryan Campbell (1) – pp – 04:10		Third period	15:19 – Ken Hodge (3); 18:19 – John McKenzie (4)
Tony Esposito 49 saves / 54 shots		Goalie stats	Gerry Cheevers 20 saves / 24 shots

Boston won series 4–0

==== (W1) St. Louis Blues vs. (W2) Pittsburgh Penguins ====
This was the first playoff meeting between these two teams. St. Louis won this year's eight-game regular season series, earning twelve of sixteen points.

The St. Louis Blues beat the Pittsburgh Penguins in six games to have won every West Division Final, as there were no Division Finals the following season. The Pens did not get to the semifinals again until their championship season in 1991.

April 19	Pittsburgh Penguins	1–3	St. Louis Blues	St. Louis Arena	Recap
No scoring		First period	No scoring
No scoring		Second period	07:12 – pp – Gary Sabourin (4); 08:10 – Phil Goyette (2); 12:58 – Red Berenson (5)
Ken Schinkel (4) – 02:10		Third period	No scoring
Les Binkley 30 saves / 33 shots		Goalie stats	Glenn Hall 24 saves / 25 shots

April 21	Pittsburgh Penguins	1–4	St. Louis Blues	St. Louis Arena	Recap
No scoring		First period	00:31 – Jean-Guy Talbot (1); 09:07 – pp – Larry Keenan (3); 15:35 – Phil Goyette (3)
No scoring		Second period	No scoring
Michel Briere (2) – 05:58		Third period	09:36 – Frank St. Marseille (1)
Les Binkley 32 saves / 36 shots		Goalie stats	Jacques Plante 23 saves / 24 shots

April 23	St. Louis Blues	2–3	Pittsburgh Penguins	Civic Arena	Recap
No scoring		First period	05:22 – pp – Dean Prentice (2)
No scoring		Second period	07:07 – Jean Pronovost (3); 10:30 – pp – Michel Briere (3)
Larry Keenan (4) – pp – 01:41; Larry Keenan (5) – 05:56		Third period	No scoring
Jacques Plante 24 saves / 27 shots		Goalie stats	Les Binkley 14 saves / 16 shots

April 26	St. Louis Blues	1–2	Pittsburgh Penguins	Civic Arena	Recap
No scoring		First period	07:06 – Duane Rupp (1)
Andre Boudrias (1) – 05:05		Second period	06:34 – Michel Briere (4)
No scoring		Third period	No scoring
Ernie Wakely 23 saves / 24 shots		Goalie stats	Al Smith 49 saves / 51 shots

April 28	Pittsburgh Penguins	0–5	St. Louis Blues	St. Louis Arena	Recap
No scoring		First period	11:56 – Frank St. Marseille (2); 15:59 – pp – Andre Boudrias (2)
No scoring		Second period	05:26 – pp – Frank St. Marseille (3); 17:18 – sh – Tim Ecclestone (2)
No scoring		Third period	05:17 – Frank St. Marseille (4)
Al Smith 30 saves / 35 shots		Goalie stats	Jacques Plante 21 saves / 21 shots

April 30	St. Louis Blues	4–3	Pittsburgh Penguins	Civic Arena	Recap
No scoring		First period	13:41 – Duane Rupp (2)
Red Berenson (6) – 07:37		Second period	04:24 – Ron Schock (1)
Bill McCreary (1) – 05:26; Tim Ecclestone (3) – 06:57; Larry Keenan (6) – 14:25		Third period	06:17 – Michel Briere (5)
Glenn Hall 30 saves / 33 shots		Goalie stats	Al Smith 26 saves / 30 shots

St. Louis won series 4–2

=== Stanley Cup Finals ===
This was the first playoff meeting between these two teams. This was St. Louis' third Stanley Cup Finals, having advanced to the round every season since entering the league. In both of their previous appearances, they lost to the Montreal Canadiens in four games. This was Boston's eleventh Stanley Cup Final appearance, having won the championship three times previously. They last advanced to the Finals in 1958 where they lost to Montreal in six games. Boston won this year's six-game regular season series, earning eight of twelve points.

Phil Esposito of the Bruins led all playoff scorers with 13 goals and 14 assists for 27 points, at the time a new NHL playoff record, followed by Orr with 20 points and Johnny Bucyk of the Bruins with 19 points. Gerry Cheevers of the Bruins led all goaltenders with twelve wins, while Jacques Plante of the Blues led all goaltenders in goals against average in the playoffs with 1.48.

May 3	Boston Bruins	6–1	St. Louis Blues	St. Louis Arena	Recap
Johnny Bucyk (6) – 19:45		First period	No scoring
Johnny Bucyk (7) – 05:16		Second period	01:52 – Jim Roberts (2)
Wayne Carleton (2) – 04:59; Johnny Bucyk (8) – 05:31; Derek Sanderson (3) – sh – 17:20; Phil Esposito (12) – 18:58		Third period	No scoring
Gerry Cheevers 28 saves / 29 shots		Goalie stats	Jacques Plante 13 saves / 14 shots Ernie Wakely 16 saves / 21 shots

May 5	Boston Bruins	6–2	St. Louis Blues	St. Louis Arena	Recap
Fred Stanfield (4) – pp – 08:10; Ed Westfall (2) – 13:38; Ed Westfall (3) – sh – 19:15		First period	No scoring
Derek Sanderson (4) – pp – 09:37		Second period	17:26 – pp – Terry Gray (2)
Derek Sanderson (5) – 00:58; Johnny Bucyk (9) – 15:00		Third period	04:15 – pp – Frank St. Marseille (5)
Gerry Cheevers 17 saves / 19 shots		Goalie stats	Ernie Wakely 29 saves / 35 shots

May 7	St. Louis Blues	1–4	Boston Bruins	Boston Garden	Recap
Frank St. Marseille (6) – pp – 05:32		First period	13:23 – pp – Johnny Bucyk (10); 18:23 – John McKenzie (5)
No scoring		Second period	No scoring
No scoring		Third period	03:26 – Wayne Cashman (4); 14:26 – Wayne Cashman (5)
Glenn Hall 20 saves / 21 shots		Goalie stats	Gerry Cheevers 42 saves / 46 shots

May 10	St. Louis Blues	3–4	OT	Boston Bruins	Boston Garden	Recap
Red Berenson (7) – 19:17		First period		05:28 – Rick Smith (1)
Gary Sabourin (5) – 03:22		Second period		14:22 – Phil Esposito (13)
Larry Keenan (7) – pp – 00:19		Third period		13:28 – Johnny Bucyk (11)
No scoring		First overtime period		00:40 – Bobby Orr (9)
Glenn Hall 28 saves / 32 shots		Goalie stats		Gerry Cheevers 28 saves / 31 shots

Boston won series 4–0

== Awards ==
1969–70 NHL awards
Prince of Wales Trophy: (East Division champion, regular season)	Chicago Black Hawks
Clarence S. Campbell Bowl: (West Division champion, regular season)	St. Louis Blues
Art Ross Trophy: (Top scorer, regular season)	Bobby Orr, Boston Bruins
Bill Masterton Memorial Trophy: (Perseverance, sportsmanship, and dedication)	Pit Martin, Chicago Black Hawks
Calder Memorial Trophy: (Top first-year player)	Tony Esposito, Chicago Black Hawks
Conn Smythe Trophy: (Most valuable player, playoffs)	Bobby Orr, Boston Bruins
Hart Memorial Trophy: (Most valuable player, regular season)	Bobby Orr, Boston Bruins
James Norris Memorial Trophy: (Best defenceman)	Bobby Orr, Boston Bruins
Lady Byng Memorial Trophy: (Excellence and sportsmanship)	Phil Goyette, St. Louis Blues
Vezina Trophy: (Goaltender(s) of team with best goaltending record)	Tony Esposito, Chicago Black Hawks

=== All-Star teams ===
First team	Position	Second team
Tony Esposito, Chicago Black Hawks	G	Ed Giacomin, New York Rangers
Bobby Orr, Boston Bruins	D	Carl Brewer, Detroit Red Wings
Brad Park, New York Rangers	D	Jacques Laperriere, Montreal Canadiens
Phil Esposito, Boston Bruins	C	Stan Mikita, Chicago Black Hawks
Gordie Howe, Detroit Red Wings	RW	John McKenzie, Boston Bruins
Bobby Hull, Chicago Black Hawks	LW	Frank Mahovlich, Detroit Red Wings

== Player statistics ==
=== Scoring leaders ===
Note: GP = Games Played, G = Goals, A = Assists, Pts = Points

Player	Team	GP	G	A	Pts	PIM
Bobby Orr	Boston Bruins	76	33	87	120	125
Phil Esposito	Boston Bruins	76	43	56	99	50
Stan Mikita	Chicago Black Hawks	76	39	47	86	50
Phil Goyette	St. Louis Blues	72	29	49	78	16
Walt Tkaczuk	New York Rangers	76	27	50	77	38
Jean Ratelle	New York Rangers	75	32	42	74	28
Red Berenson	St. Louis Blues	67	33	39	72	38
J. P. Parise	Minnesota North Stars	74	24	48	72	72
Gordie Howe	Detroit Red Wings	76	31	40	71	58
Frank Mahovlich	Detroit Red Wings	74	38	32	70	59
Dave Balon	New York Rangers	76	33	37	70	100
John McKenzie	Boston Bruins	72	29	41	70	114

Source: NHL.

=== Leading goaltenders ===
Note: GP = Games played; Min = Minutes played; GA = Goals against; GAA = Goals against average; W = Wins; L = Losses; T = Ties; SO = Shutouts

Player	Team	GP	MIN	GA	GAA	W	L	T	SO
Ernie Wakely	St. Louis Blues	30	1651	58	2.11	12	9	4	4
Tony Esposito	Chicago Black Hawks	63	3763	136	2.17	38	17	8	15
Jacques Plante	St. Louis Blues	32	1839	67	2.19	18	9	5	5
Ed Giacomin	New York Rangers	70	4148	163	2.36	35	21	14	6
Roy Edwards	Detroit Red Wings	47	2683	116	2.59	24	15	6	2
Rogatien Vachon	Montreal Canadiens	64	3697	162	2.63	31	18	12	4
Roger Crozier	Detroit Red Wings	34	1877	83	2.65	16	6	9	0
Gerry Cheevers	Boston Bruins	41	2384	108	2.72	24	8	8	4
Bernie Parent	Philadelphia Flyers	62	3680	171	2.79	13	29	20	3
Ed Johnston	Boston Bruins	37	2176	108	2.98	16	9	11	3

=== Other statistics ===
- Plus-Minus leader: Bobby Orr, Boston Bruins

== Coaches ==
=== East ===
- Boston Bruins: Harry Sinden
- Chicago Black Hawks: Billy Reay
- Detroit Red Wings: Bill Gadsby and Sid Abel
- Montreal Canadiens: Claude Ruel
- New York Rangers: Emile Francis
- Toronto Maple Leafs: John McLellan

=== West ===
- Los Angeles Kings: Hal Laycoe and Larry Regan
- Minnesota North Stars: Wren Blair and Charlie Burns
- Oakland Seals: Fred Glover
- Philadelphia Flyers: Vic Stasiuk
- Pittsburgh Penguins: Red Kelly
- St. Louis Blues: Scotty Bowman

== Debuts ==
The following is a list of players of note who played their first NHL game in 1969–70 (listed with their first team, asterisk(*) marks debut in playoffs):

- Keith Magnuson, Chicago Black Hawks
- Butch Goring, Los Angeles Kings
- Gilles Gilbert, Minnesota North Stars
- Guy Charron, Montreal Canadiens
- Marc Tardif, Montreal Canadiens
- Rejean Houle, Montreal Canadiens
- Don Luce, New York Rangers
- Bobby Clarke, Philadelphia Flyers

== Last games ==
The following is a list of players of note that played their last game in the NHL in 1969–70 (listed with their last team):

- Ron Murphy, Boston Bruins
- Leo Boivin, Minnesota North Stars
- Moose Vasko, Minnesota North Stars
- Claude Provost, Montreal Canadiens
- Terry Sawchuk, New York Rangers
- Camille Henry, St. Louis Blues
- Johnny Bower, Toronto Maple Leafs
- Marcel Pronovost, Toronto Maple Leafs

== Broadcasting ==
Hockey Night in Canada on CBC Television televised Saturday night regular season games and Stanley Cup playoff games. HNIC also produced Wednesday night regular season game telecasts for CTV.

This was the fourth season under the U.S. rights agreement with CBS, airing Sunday afternoon regular season and playoff games.

== See also ==
- List of Stanley Cup champions
- 1969 NHL amateur draft
- 1969–70 NHL transactions
- 23rd National Hockey League All-Star Game
- National Hockey League All-Star Game
- 1969 in sports
- 1970 in sports
