= 1964 Stanley Cup Final =

1964 ice hockey championship series

	1	2	3	4	5	6	7	Total
Detroit Red Wings	2	4*	4	2	2	3*	0	3
Toronto Maple Leafs	3	3*	3	4	1	4*	4	4
- * – Denotes overtime period(s)
- Location(s): Toronto: Maple Leaf Gardens (1, 2, 5, 7); Detroit: Olympia Stadium (3, 4, 6)
- Coaches: Detroit: Sid Abel; Toronto: Punch Imlach
- Captains: Detroit: Alex Delvecchio; Toronto: George Armstrong
- Dates: April 11–25, 1964
- Series-winning goal: Andy Bathgate (3:04, first)
- Hall of Famers: Maple Leafs: Al Arbour (1996, builder); George Armstrong (1975); Andy Bathgate (1978); Johnny Bower (1976); Tim Horton (1977); Red Kelly (1969); Dave Keon (1986); Frank Mahovlich (1981); Bob Pulford (1991); Allan Stanley (1981); Red Wings: Alex Delvecchio (1977); Bill Gadsby (1970); Gordie Howe (1972); Marcel Pronovost (1978); Terry Sawchuk (1971); Norm Ullman (1982); Coaches: Sid Abel (1969, player); Punch Imlach (1984); Officials: Josh Ashley (1981); Neil Armstrong (1991); George Hayes (1988); Matt Pavelich (1987); Frank Udvari (1973)

The 1964 Stanley Cup Final was the championship series of the National Hockey League's (NHL) 1963–64 season, and the culmination of the 1964 Stanley Cup playoffs. It was contested between the defending champion Toronto Maple Leafs and the Detroit Red Wings for the second straight year. The Maple Leafs overcame a 3-2 series deficit to defeat the Red Wings in seven games for their third-straight championship. It was the second Stanley Cup three-peat by the Maple Leafs.

As of today, this is the last time the Stanley Cup Final has ended before the month of May. There would not be another game seven at Maple Leaf Gardens for almost three decades.

== Paths to the Finals ==
Toronto defeated the Montreal Canadiens 4–3 to advance to the finals and Detroit defeated the Chicago Black Hawks 4–3.

== Game summaries ==
This series is famous for the courageous play of Bob Baun. In game six of the Final, he took a Gordie Howe slapshot on his ankle and had to leave play. He returned in overtime and scored the winning goal. He also played in game seven despite the pain and only after the series was over was it revealed that he had played on a fractured ankle.

Until the 2008–09 Final, John MacMillan was the only player to play in back-to-back Finals with different teams in successive series that pitted the same teams against each other. MacMillan won the Cup with the 1963 Toronto Maple Leafs in a five-game decision over Detroit and then lost the 1964 Cup Final to the Leafs as a member of the Red Wings.

=== Game one ===
April 11	Detroit Red Wings	2–3	Toronto Maple Leafs	Maple Leaf Gardens	Recap

Scoring summary
Period	Team	Goal	Assist(s)	Time	Score
1st	DET	Bruce MacGregor (3)	Doug Barkley (3)	04:31	1–0 DET
1st	TOR	George Armstrong (2)	Allan Stanley (4) and Don McKenney (4)	04:44	1–1
1st	DET	Gordie Howe (6) – pp	Alex Delvecchio (5) and Parker MacDonald (3)	10:25	2–1 DET
2nd	None				
3rd	TOR	George Armstrong (3) – pp	Red Kelly (6) and Don McKenney (5)	04:31	2–2
3rd	TOR	Bob Pulford (3) – sh	Unassisted	19:58	3–2 TOR
Penalty summary
Period	Team	Player	Penalty	Time	PIM
1st	DET	Doug Barkley	Charging	01:08	2:00
1st	DET	Bill Gadsby	Interference	03:23	2:00
1st	TOR	Bob Pulford	High-sticking	03:23	2:00
1st	DET	Larry Jeffrey	High-sticking	06:25	2:00
1st	TOR	George Armstrong	Misconduct	09:52	10:00
1st	TOR	Eddie Shack	High-sticking	09:52	2:00
1st	DET	Paul Henderson	Hooking	10:42	2:00
1st	DET	Larry Jeffrey	Slashing	13:43	2:00
1st	TOR	Bob Pulford	Charging	13:43	2:00
1st	DET	Doug Barkley	Hooking	19:44	2:00
2nd	TOR	Bobby Baun	Charging	08:15	2:00
2nd	DET	Marcel Pronovost	Tripping	12:55	2:00
3rd	DET	Norm Ullman	Holding	03:10	2:00
3rd	TOR	Andy Bathgate	High-sticking	03:10	2:00
3rd	TOR	Andy Bathgate	Misconduct	03:10	2:00
3rd	DET	Andre Pronovost	Holding	03:34	2:00
3rd	TOR	Allan Stanley	Holding	19:18	2:00

Shots by period
Team	1	2	3	Total
Detroit	9	9	14	32
Toronto	10	8	14	32

=== Game two ===
April 14	Detroit Red Wings	4–3	OT	Toronto Maple Leafs	Maple Leaf Gardens	Recap

Scoring summary
Period	Team	Goal	Assist(s)	Time	Score
1st	TOR	Allan Stanley (1)	Red Kelly (7) and Frank Mahovlich (5)	04:41	1–0 TOR
1st	DET	Norm Ullman (7)	Bill Gadsby (3) and Larry Jeffrey (5)	12:43	1–1
2nd	DET	Eddie Joyal (1)	Doug Barkley (4)	03:19	2–1 DET
2nd	DET	Floyd Smith (2) – pp	Gordie Howe (7)	16:15	3–1 DET
3rd	TOR	Red Kelly (3)	Bobby Baun (2) and Frank Mahovlich (6)	11:57	3–2 DET
3rd	TOR	Gerry Ehman (1)	Andy Bathgate (3) and Ron Stewart (2)	19:17	3–3
OT	DET	Larry Jeffrey (1)	Gordie Howe (8) and Norm Ullman (8)	07:52	4–3 DET
Penalty summary
Period	Team	Player	Penalty	Time	PIM
1st	DET	Marcel Pronovost	Holding	01:00	2:00
1st	DET	Bill Gadsby	Charging	08:56	2:00
1st	TOR	Tim Horton	Tripping	19:51	2:00
2nd	DET	Al Langlois	Holding	04:05	2:00
2nd	DET	Gordie Howe	High-sticking	10:29	2:00
2nd	TOR	Tim Horton	High-sticking	10:29	2:00
2nd	TOR	Bobby Baun	Charging	14:46	2:00
3rd	DET	Al Langlois	Tripping	17:15	2:00
OT	DET	Gordie Howe	High-sticking	02:45	2:00
OT	TOR	Larry Hillman	High-sticking	02:45	2:00
OT	TOR	Tim Horton	Tripping	03:18	2:00

Shots by period
Team	1	2	3	OT	Total
Detroit	16	11	14	8	49
Toronto	12	5	11	1	29

=== Game three ===
April 16	Toronto Maple Leafs	3–4	Detroit Red Wings	Detroit Olympia	Recap

Scoring summary
Period	Team	Goal	Assist(s)	Time	Score
1st	DET	Floyd Smith (3)	Unassisted	02:40	1–0 DET
1st	DET	Bruce MacGregor (4)	Doug Barkley (5) and Pit Martin (3)	03:38	2–0 DET
1st	DET	Floyd Smith (4) – pp	Norm Ullman (9) and Alex Delvecchio (6)	14:47	3–0 DET
2nd	TOR	Andy Bathgate (3) – pp	Frank Mahovlich (7) and Red Kelly (8)	04:16	3–1 DET
3rd	TOR	Dave Keon (4)	Don McKenney (6) and George Armstrong (6)	07:34	3–2 DET
3rd	TOR	Don McKenney (4)	Tim Horton (3) and Dave Keon (2)	18:47	3–3
3rd	DET	Alex Delvecchio (3)	Gordie Howe (9) and Andre Pronovost (3)	19:43	4–3 DET
Penalty summary
Period	Team	Player	Penalty	Time	PIM
1st	DET	Andre Pronovost	Holding	05:07	2:00
1st	TOR	Bobby Baun	Charging	14:40	2:00
1st	TOR	Bobby Baun	Charging	17:44	2:00
2nd	DET	Eddie Joyal	Holding	02:11	2:00
2nd	TOR	Carl Brewer	Interference	05:29	2:00
2nd	DET	Bruce MacGregor	Tripping	08:03	2:00
2nd	TOR	Red Kelly	Hooking	09:04	2:00
2nd	DET	Eddie Joyal	Tripping	12:47	2:00
3rd	DET	Andre Pronovost	High-sticking	08:50	2:00

Shots by period
Team	1	2	3	Total
Toronto	9	14	11	34
Detroit	15	8	11	34

=== Game four ===
April 18	Toronto Maple Leafs	4–2	Detroit Red Wings	Detroit Olympia	Recap

Scoring summary
Period	Team	Goal	Assist(s)	Time	Score
1st	TOR	Dave Keon (5)	Tim Horton (4) and Don McKenney (7)	05:45	1–0 TOR
2nd	DET	Bruce MacGregor (5)	Eddie Joyal (3)	05:57	1–1
2nd	DET	Gordie Howe (5) – pp	Larry Jeffrey (6) and Norm Ullman (10)	13:05	2–1 DET
2nd	TOR	Dave Keon (6)	Don McKenney (8) and George Armstrong (7)	16:09	2–2
3rd	TOR	Andy Bathgate (4)	Frank Mahovlich (8) and Red Kelly (9)	10:55	3–2 TOR
3rd	TOR	Frank Mahovlich (4)	Ron Stewart (3) and Bob Pulford (2)	18:09	4–2 TOR
Penalty summary
Period	Team	Player	Penalty	Time	PIM
1st	TOR	Ron Stewart	Interference	07:42	2:00
1st	TOR	Carl Brewer	Holding	09:33	2:00
1st	TOR	Tim Horton	Charging	13:00	2:00
1st	DET	Gordie Howe	Elbowing	14:28	2:00
1st	TOR	Bob Pulford	Hooking	16:53	2:00
2nd	DET	Bill Gadsby	Interference	02:27	2:00
2nd	DET	Doug Barkley	Hooking	09:59	2:00
2nd	TOR	Eddie Shack	Tripping	12:09	2:00
2nd	TOR	Allan Stanley	Misconduct	12:09	10:00
2nd	DET	Bill Gadsby	Hooking	15:39	2:00
2nd	DET	Doug Barkley	Tripping	15:59	2:00
2nd	TOR	Bobby Baun	Charging	19:50	2:00
2nd	DET	Bruce MacGregor	High-sticking	20:00	2:00
2nd	TOR	Carl Brewer	Roughing	20:00	2:00
3rd	None				

Shots by period
Team	1	2	3	Total
Toronto	11	11	13	35
Detroit	7	12	8	27

=== Game five ===
April 21	Detroit Red Wings	2–1	Toronto Maple Leafs	Maple Leaf Gardens	Recap

Scoring summary
Period	Team	Goal	Assist(s)	Time	Score
1st	DET	Gordie Howe (8)	Alex Delvecchio (7)	10:52	1–0 DET
2nd	None				
3rd	DET	Eddie Joyal (2)	Andre Pronovost (3)	07:50	2–0 DET
3rd	TOR	George Armstrong (4) – pp	Andy Bathgate (4) and Frank Mahovlich (9)	14:57	2–1 DET
Penalty summary
Period	Team	Player	Penalty	Time	PIM
1st	DET	Marcel Pronovost	Tripping	04:57	2:00
1st	DET	Al Langlois	Tripping	15:35	2:00
1st	DET	Gordie Howe	Elbowing	17:24	2:00
1st	TOR	Bob Pulford	Elbowing	17:24	2:00
1st	TOR	Bob Pulford	Elbowing	19:42	2:00
2nd	TOR	Bobby Baun	Tripping	07:57	2:00
2nd	DET	Paul Henderson	Hooking	12:15	2:00
3rd	DET	Bill Gadsby	Holding	13:56	2:00
3rd	DET	Marcel Pronovost	Tripping	14:23	2:00

Shots by period
Team	1	2	3	Total
Toronto	12	11	11	34
Detroit	13	8	13	34

=== Game six ===
April 23	Toronto Maple Leafs	4–3	OT	Detroit Red Wings	Detroit Olympia	Recap

Scoring summary
Period	Team	Goal	Assist(s)	Time	Score
1st	TOR	Bob Pulford (4) – sh	Allan Stanley (5)	17:01	1–0 TOR
2nd	DET	Paul Henderson (2)	Pit Martin (4)	04:20	1–1
2nd	DET	Pit Martin (1) – pp	Gordie Howe (10) and John MacMillan (1)	10:56	2–1 DET
2nd	TOR	Bob Pulford (5)	Ron Stewart (4) and Carl Brewer (1)	14:36	2–2
2nd	DET	Gordie Howe (9)	Alex Delvecchio (8) and Bill Gadsby (4)	15:56	3–2 DET
2nd	TOR	Billy Harris (1)	George Armstrong (8) and Bobby Baun (3)	17:48	3–3
3rd	None				
OT	TOR	Bobby Baun (2)	Bob Pulford (3)	01:43	4–3 TOR
Penalty summary
Period	Team	Player	Penalty	Time	PIM
1st	TOR	Gerry Ehman	Boarding	04:40	2:00
1st	DET	Bill Gadsby	Charging	08:48	2:00
1st	TOR	Bobby Baun	Holding	15:10	2:00
2nd	TOR	Bobby Baun	Charging	09:59	2:00
2nd	TOR	Ed Litzenberger	Misconduct	15:56	10:00
2nd	DET	Al Langlois	High-sticking	19:15	2:00
3rd	DET	Pit Martin	Misconduct	03:07	10:00
3rd	TOR	Carl Brewer	Hooking	06:04	2:00
OT	None				

Shots by period
Team	1	2	3	OT	Total
Toronto	15	12	8	1	36
Detroit	8	16	16	1	41

=== Game seven ===
April 25	Detroit Red Wings	0–4	Toronto Maple Leafs	Maple Leaf Gardens	Recap

Scoring summary
Period	Team	Goal	Assist(s)	Time	Score
1st	TOR	Andy Bathgate (5)	Unassisted	03:04	1–0 TOR
2nd	TOR	Dave Keon (7)	Billy Harris (1)	04:26	2–0 TOR
2nd	TOR	Red Kelly (4)	Allan Stanley (6) and Frank Mahovlich (10)	05:53	3–0 TOR
2nd	TOR	George Armstrong (5)	Frank Mahovlich (11)	15:26	4–0 TOR
3rd	None				
Penalty summary
Period	Team	Player	Penalty	Time	PIM
1st	TOR	Tim Horton	Closing hand on puck	05:05	2:00
1st	DET	Eddie Joyal	Holding	06:34	2:00
1st	DET	Bill Gadsby	Cross-checking	08:51	2:00
1st	TOR	Billy Harris	Elbowing	08:51	2:00
2nd	TOR	Billy Harris	Cross-checking	04:00	2:00
2nd	DET	John MacMillan	Tripping	15:29	2:00
3rd	DET	Andre Pronovost	Interference	11:41	2:00
3rd	TOR	Tim Horton	Tripping	15:36	2:00
3rd	TOR	Carl Brewer	Charging	18:44	2:00

Shots by period
Team	1	2	3	Total
Detroit	8	12	13	33
Toronto	13	10	14	37

== Stanley Cup engraving ==
The 1964 Stanley Cup was presented to Maple Leafs captain George Armstrong by NHL President Clarence Campbell following the Maple Leafs 4–0 win over the Red Wings in game seven.

The following Maple Leafs players and staff had their names engraved on the Stanley Cup

1963–64 Toronto Maple Leafs

=== Players ===
Centres

- 4 Leonard Red Kelly
- 14 Dave Keon
- 15 Billy Harris
- 17 Don McKenney

Wingers

- 8 Gerry Ehman
- 10 George Armstrong (Captain)
- 18 Jim Pappin
- 20 Bob Pulford (A)
- 23 Eddie Shack
- 25 Ed Litzenberger^
- 12 Ron Stewart
- 27 Frank Mahovlich
- 9 Andy Bathgate

Defencemen

- 2 Carl Brewer
- 3 Al Arbour^
- 7 Miles Tim Horton
- 16 Larry Hillman
- 19 Kent Douglas^
- 21 Bob Baun
- 26 Allan Stanley (A)

Goaltenders

- 1 Johnny Bower
- 24 Don Simmons

=== Coaching and administrative staff ===
- Stafford Smythe (President/Owner), Harold Ballard (Exe. Vice President/Owner)
- John W. H. Bassett (Chairman/Owner)
- George Punch Imlach (Manager-Coach), Frank King Clancy (Asst. Manager-Coach)*
- Bob Haggert (Trainer)
- Tom Nayler (Asst. Trainer)
- Hugh Hoult (Stickboy/Asst. Trainer)

=== Stanley Cup engraving ===
- #25 Ed Litzenberger^ (RW – 19 regular season games and 1 Finals game) and #3 Al Arbour^ (D – 6 regular season games and 1 Finals game) played in the Stanley Cup Final qualified to have their names engraved on the Stanley Cup, but were left off. Both spent most of the season in the minors.
- #19 Kent Douglas^ (D) – played in 43 games for Toronto. His name was left off the Stanley Cup because he played in the minors during the playoffs.
- * Frank "King" Clancy's name was misspelled on the Stanley Cup as FRANK KING CLANCE ASST COACH GEN MAN. In 1992–93 the mistake was corrected on the newly created Replica Cup.
- Bob Davidson (Chief Scout), Dr. Karl Elieff (Physiotherapist), Dr. Jame Murphy, Dr. Hugh Smythe (Team Doctors) - left off
- (Also see 1965 Montreal about Toronto 1962-63-64 engravings).

== See also ==
- 1963–64 NHL season

== Notes ==
Preceded by Toronto Maple Leafs; 1963	Toronto Maple Leafs; Stanley Cup champions 1964	Succeeded by Montreal Canadiens; 1965
