= 1963–64 Chicago Black Hawks season =

National Hockey League team season

1963–64 Chicago Black Hawks
- League: 2nd NHL
- 1963–64 record: 36–22–12
- Home record: 26–4–5
- Road record: 10–18–4
- Goals for: 218
- Goals against: 169

Team information
- General manager: Tommy Ivan
- Coach: Billy Reay
- Captain: Pierre Pilote
- Alternate captains: Bill Hay
- Arena: Chicago Stadium

Team leaders
- Goals: Bobby Hull (43)
- Assists: Stan Mikita (50)
- Points: Stan Mikita (89)
- Penalty minutes: Stan Mikita (146)
- Wins: Glenn Hall (34)
- Goals against average: Glenn Hall (2.30)

The 1963–64 Chicago Black Hawks season was the Hawks' 38th season in the NHL, and the club was coming off a second-place finish in 1962–63, as Chicago won a team record 32 games and also set a club record with 81 points. The Hawks would then be defeated by the Detroit Red Wings in the NHL-semi finals, making it the first time since 1960 that Chicago did not play in the Stanley Cup finals.

During the off-season, the Blackhawks decided not to bring back head coach Rudy Pilous, and hired former Toronto Maple Leafs head coach Billy Reay to replace him, where he coached from 1957 to 1959, posting a record of 26–50–14. Reay had most recently been the head coach of the Buffalo Bisons of the AHL.

Chicago started the year off on a hot streak, as they opened the season off with a 15–2–6 record in their first 23 games. The Hawks cooled down, but remained in a battle with the Montreal Canadiens and Toronto Maple Leafs for first place in the NHL. The Hawks and Maple Leafs played a wild game on December 7, which resulted in a bench clearing brawl after Leafs player Bobby Baun dragged Blackhawk Reg Fleming out of the penalty box, as Fleming was about to serve a penalty for spearing Toronto player Eddie Shack. A total of seven major penalties, six misconducts, three game misconducts and $25 fines were issued against 22 players who left the bench. Hawks head coach Billy Reay and Leafs head coach Punch Imlach were fined $1000, while Reg Fleming received a $200 fine, and Murray Balfour was hit for a $100 fine for Chicago, while Bobby Baun ($150), Larry Hillman ($150) and Carl Brewer ($50) received fines on the Maple Leafs. The other 22 players who left the bench also had an additional $100 fine for their role in the brawl.

The Black Hawks continued the season playing very good hockey, and ended the season finished in second place for the second consecutive season, finishing with a club record 36 wins and 84 points, as they finished one point behind the Montreal Canadiens for top spot in the NHL.

Offensively, the Hawks were led by Stan Mikita, who led the league with 89 points, winning the Art Ross Trophy for the first time in his career. Mikita also led the team with 146 penalty minutes. He became the first player to lead the league in scoring and in penalty minutes. Bobby Hull scored a league high 43 goals, and finished just behind Mikita with 87 points, while Kenny Wharram scored 39 goals and 71 points. Wharram also was awarded the Lady Byng Trophy. Pierre Pilote led the defense, scoring 7 goals and 53 points, while earning his second consecutive Norris Trophy.

In goal, Glenn Hall once again played the majority of the games, winning a club record 34 games, while posting a 2.30 GAA, and earning 7 shutouts along the way.

The Hawks would face the Detroit Red Wings in the NHL semi-finals, as Detroit finished fourth in the NHL with a record of 30–29–11, earning 71 points, which was 13 less than Chicago. The series opened up at Chicago Stadium for the opening two games, and the Black Hawks won the series opener, defeating the Red Wings 4–1, however, Detroit evened up the series in the second game with a 5–4 win. The series shifted to the Detroit Olympia for the next two games, and Detroit took a 2–1 series lead, shutting out the Hawks 3–0, however, Chicago evened the series up in the fourth game, winning 3–2 in overtime. Chicago took a series lead in the fifth game at home, holding off the Wings for a 3–2 victory, however, Detroit once again even the series up in the sixth game at the Olympia, hammering the Black Hawks 7–2, setting up a seventh and final game of the series. The Black Hawks, who had lost only five times at home all season long, were stunned by the underdog Red Wings, as Detroit won the game 4–2, and eliminated the Black Hawks for the second straight season.

== Season standings ==
National Hockey League
		GP	W	L	T	GF	GA	DIFF	Pts
1	Montreal Canadiens	70	36	21	13	209	167	+42	85
2	Chicago Black Hawks	70	36	22	12	218	169	+49	84
3	Toronto Maple Leafs	70	33	25	12	192	172	+20	78
4	Detroit Red Wings	70	30	29	11	191	204	−13	71
5	New York Rangers	70	22	38	10	186	242	−56	54
6	Boston Bruins	70	18	40	12	170	212	−42	48

=== Record vs. opponents ===
1963–64 NHL Records
Team	BOS	CHI	DET	MTL	NYR	TOR
Boston	—	3–9–2	3–10–1	2–7–5	5–7–2	5–7–2
Chicago	9–3–2	—	5–6–3	7–5–2	9–3–2	7–5–2
Detroit	10–3–1	6–5–3	—	5–7–2	6–6–2	3–8–3
Montreal	7–2–5	5–7–2	7–5–2	—	10–3–1	7–5–2
New York	7–5–2	3–9–2	6–6–2	3–10–1	—	3–8–3
Toronto	7–5–2	5–7–2	8–3–3	5–7–2	8–3–3	—

== Schedule and results ==
=== Regular season ===
1963–64 regular season
October

Game	Date	Visitor	Score	Home	Record	Points
1	October 9	New York Rangers	1–3	Chicago Black Hawks	1–0–0	2
2	October 10	Chicago Black Hawks	3–5	Detroit Red Wings	1–1–0	2
3	October 13	Toronto Maple Leafs	2–4	Chicago Black Hawks	2–1–0	4
4	October 16	Boston Bruins	2–5	Chicago Black Hawks	3–1–0	6
5	October 20	Montreal Canadiens	3–5	Chicago Black Hawks	4–1–0	8
6	October 24	Chicago Black Hawks	2–2	Detroit Red Wings	4–1–1	9
7	October 26	Chicago Black Hawks	1–1	Montreal Canadiens	4–1–2	10
8	October 27	Chicago Black Hawks	4–1	New York Rangers	5–1–2	12
9	October 29	Detroit Red Wings	1–5	Chicago Black Hawks	6–1–2	14

November

Game	Date	Visitor	Score	Home	Record	Points
10	November 2	Chicago Black Hawks	2–0	Toronto Maple Leafs	7–1–2	16
11	November 5	New York Rangers	2–3	Chicago Black Hawks	8–1–2	18
12	November 7	Chicago Black Hawks	2–2	Montreal Canadiens	8–1–3	19
13	November 9	Chicago Black Hawks	3–3	Toronto Maple Leafs	8–1–4	20
14	November 10	Chicago Black Hawks	2–4	Boston Bruins	8–2–4	20
15	November 13	Boston Bruins	4–6	Chicago Black Hawks	9–2–4	22
16	November 16	Chicago Black Hawks	5–2	Montreal Canadiens	10–2–4	24
17	November 17	Toronto Maple Leafs	0–6	Chicago Black Hawks	11–2–4	26
18	November 20	Detroit Red Wings	2–5	Chicago Black Hawks	12–2–4	28
19	November 24	Montreal Canadiens	3–7	Chicago Black Hawks	13–2–4	30
20	November 28	Toronto Maple Leafs	0–2	Chicago Black Hawks	14–2–4	32
21	November 30	Chicago Black Hawks	3–2	New York Rangers	15–2–4	34

December

Game	Date	Visitor	Score	Home	Record	Points
22	December 1	New York Rangers	3–3	Chicago Black Hawks	15–2–5	35
23	December 4	Boston Bruins	2–2	Chicago Black Hawks	15–2–6	36
24	December 7	Chicago Black Hawks	0–3	Toronto Maple Leafs	15–3–6	36
25	December 8	Montreal Canadiens	0–3	Chicago Black Hawks	16–3–6	38
26	December 11	Chicago Black Hawks	6–2	New York Rangers	17–3–6	40
27	December 12	Chicago Black Hawks	1–2	Boston Bruins	17–4–6	40
28	December 14	Chicago Black Hawks	4–5	Detroit Red Wings	17–5–6	40
29	December 15	Detroit Red Wings	4–4	Chicago Black Hawks	17–5–7	41
30	December 18	Boston Bruins	2–1	Chicago Black Hawks	17–6–7	41
31	December 21	Chicago Black Hawks	2–3	Montreal Canadiens	17–7–7	41
32	December 22	Chicago Black Hawks	4–1	Boston Bruins	18–7–7	43
33	December 25	Montreal Canadiens	1–3	Chicago Black Hawks	19–7–7	45
34	December 27	Chicago Black Hawks	2–4	New York Rangers	19–8–7	45
35	December 29	Toronto Maple Leafs	0–2	Chicago Black Hawks	20–8–7	47

January

Game	Date	Visitor	Score	Home	Record	Points
36	January 1	New York Rangers	5–2	Chicago Black Hawks	20–9–7	47
37	January 4	Chicago Black Hawks	0–3	Toronto Maple Leafs	20–10–7	47
38	January 5	Boston Bruins	3–5	Chicago Black Hawks	21–10–7	49
39	January 9	Chicago Black Hawks	3–5	Detroit Red Wings	21–11–7	49
40	January 11	Detroit Red Wings	3–6	Chicago Black Hawks	22–11–7	51
41	January 12	Montreal Canadiens	2–1	Chicago Black Hawks	22–12–7	51
42	January 16	Chicago Black Hawks	0–1	Montreal Canadiens	22–13–7	51
43	January 18	New York Rangers	1–6	Chicago Black Hawks	23–13–7	53
44	January 19	Toronto Maple Leafs	2–0	Chicago Black Hawks	23–14–7	53
45	January 23	Chicago Black Hawks	3–1	Boston Bruins	24–14–7	55
46	January 23	Chicago Black Hawks	3–5	Detroit Red Wings	24–15–7	55
47	January 26	Montreal Canadiens	2–2	Chicago Black Hawks	24–15–8	56
48	January 29	Detroit Red Wings	2–2	Chicago Black Hawks	24–15–9	57

February

Game	Date	Visitor	Score	Home	Record	Points
49	February 1	Chicago Black Hawks	2–2	New York Rangers	24–15–10	58
50	February 2	Chicago Black Hawks	5–2	Boston Bruins	25–15–10	60
51	February 5	Detroit Red Wings	2–4	Chicago Black Hawks	26–15–10	62
52	February 6	Chicago Black Hawks	0–4	Detroit Red Wings	26–16–10	62
53	February 8	Chicago Black Hawks	3–3	Toronto Maple Leafs	26–16–11	63
54	February 9	Toronto Maple Leafs	1–2	Chicago Black Hawks	27–16–11	65
55	February 12	New York Rangers	2–5	Chicago Black Hawks	28–16–11	67
56	February 15	Chicago Black Hawks	0–4	Toronto Maple Leafs	28–17–11	67
57	February 16	Boston Bruins	3–5	Chicago Black Hawks	29–17–11	69
58	February 19	Chicago Black Hawks	7–2	New York Rangers	30–17–11	71
59	February 22	Chicago Black Hawks	1–3	Montreal Canadiens	30–18–11	71
60	February 23	Boston Bruins	0–2	Chicago Black Hawks	31–18–11	73
61	February 27	Detroit Red Wings	2–4	Chicago Black Hawks	32–18–11	75
62	February 29	Chicago Black Hawks	1–4	Toronto Maple Leafs	32–19–11	75

March

Game	Date	Visitor	Score	Home	Record	Points
63	March 1	Montreal Canadiens	3–4	Chicago Black Hawks	33–19–11	77
64	March 4	Chicago Black Hawks	3–4	New York Rangers	33–20–11	77
65	March 5	Chicago Black Hawks	4–4	Boston Bruins	33–20–12	78
66	March 8	Toronto Maple Leafs	3–4	Chicago Black Hawks	34–20–12	80
67	March 14	Chicago Black Hawks	3–4	Montreal Canadiens	34–21–12	80
68	March 15	Chicago Black Hawks	3–5	Detroit Red Wings	34–22–12	80
69	March 17	New York Rangers	0–4	Chicago Black Hawks	35–22–12	82
70	March 22	Chicago Black Hawks	4–3	Boston Bruins	36–22–12	84

Legend: Win (2 points) Loss (0 points) Tie (1 point)

=== Playoffs ===
1964 Stanley Cup playoffs
Semifinals vs. (4) Detroit Red Wings – Red Wings win 4–3

Game	Date	Visitor	Score	Home	Series
1	March 26	Detroit Red Wings	1–4	Chicago Black Hawks	1–0
2	March 29	Detroit Red Wings	5–4	Chicago Black Hawks	1–1
3	March 31	Chicago Black Hawks	0–3	Detroit Red Wings	1–2
4	April 2	Chicago Black Hawks	3–2	Detroit Red Wings	2–2
5	April 5	Detroit Red Wings	2–3	Chicago Black Hawks	3–2
6	April 7	Chicago Black Hawks	2–7	Detroit Red Wings	3–3
7	April 9	Detroit Red Wings	4–2	Chicago Black Hawks	3–4

Legend: Win Loss

== Season stats ==
=== Scoring leaders ===
Player	GP	G	A	Pts	PIM
Stan Mikita	70	39	50	89	146
Bobby Hull	70	43	44	87	50
Kenny Wharram	70	39	32	71	18
Bill Hay	70	23	33	56	30
Pierre Pilote	70	7	46	53	84

=== Goaltending ===
Player	GP	TOI	W	L	T	GA	SO	GAA
Glenn Hall	65	3860	34	19	11	148	7	2.30
Denis DeJordy	6	340	2	3	1	19	0	3.35

== Playoff stats ==
=== Scoring leaders ===
Player	GP	G	A	Pts	PIM
Stan Mikita	7	3	6	9	8
Pierre Pilote	7	2	6	8	6
Bobby Hull	7	2	5	7	2
Bill Hay	7	3	1	4	4
Kenny Wharram	7	2	2	4	6

=== Goaltending ===
Player	GP	TOI	W	L	GA	SO	GAA
Glenn Hall	7	408	3	4	22	0	3.24
Denis DeJordy	1	20	0	0	2	0	6.00

== Draft picks ==
Chicago's draft picks at the 1963 NHL amateur draft held at the Queen Elizabeth Hotel in Montreal.

Round	#	Player	Nationality	College/Junior/Club team (League)
1	5	Art Hampson	Canada	Trenton Midgets
2	11	Wayne Davison	Canada	Georgetown Midgets
3	16	Bill Carson	Canada	Brampton Midgets

== Sources ==
- Hockey-Reference
- Rauzulu's Street
- Goalies Archive
- HockeyDB
- National Hockey League Guide & Record Book 2007
