= 1963–64 New York Rangers season =

NHL hockey team season

1963–64 New York Rangers
- League: 5th NHL
- 1963–64 record: 22–38–10
- Home record: 14–13–8
- Road record: 8–25–2
- Goals for: 186
- Goals against: 242

Team information
- General manager: Muzz Patrick
- Coach: George Sullivan
- Captain: Andy Bathgate
- Arena: Madison Square Garden

Team leaders
- Goals: Camille Henry (29)
- Assists: Andy Bathgate (43)
- Points: Phil Goyette (65)
- Penalty minutes: Vic Hadfield (151)
- Wins: Jacques Plante (22)
- Goals against average: Jacques Plante (3.38)

The 1963–64 New York Rangers season was the franchise's 38th season. The highlight of the season was trading for goaltender Jacques Plante. The Rangers failed to qualify for the playoffs for the second year in a row for the first time since the 1959–60 season and the 1960–61 season.

== Offseason ==
On June 4, 1963, Plante was traded to the New York Rangers, with Phil Goyette and Don Marshall in exchange for Gump Worsley, Dave Balon, and Leon Rochefort.

== Final standings ==
=== Regular season ===
National Hockey League
		GP	W	L	T	GF	GA	DIFF	Pts
1	Montreal Canadiens	70	36	21	13	209	167	+42	85
2	Chicago Black Hawks	70	36	22	12	218	169	+49	84
3	Toronto Maple Leafs	70	33	25	12	192	172	+20	78
4	Detroit Red Wings	70	30	29	11	191	204	−13	71
5	New York Rangers	70	22	38	10	186	242	−56	54
6	Boston Bruins	70	18	40	12	170	212	−42	48

=== Record vs. opponents ===
1963–64 NHL Records
Team	BOS	CHI	DET	MTL	NYR	TOR
Boston	—	3–9–2	3–10–1	2–7–5	5–7–2	5–7–2
Chicago	9–3–2	—	5–6–3	7–5–2	9–3–2	7–5–2
Detroit	10–3–1	6–5–3	—	5–7–2	6–6–2	3–8–3
Montreal	7–2–5	5–7–2	7–5–2	—	10–3–1	7–5–2
New York	7–5–2	3–9–2	6–6–2	3–10–1	—	3–8–3
Toronto	7–5–2	5–7–2	8–3–3	5–7–2	8–3–3	—

== Schedule and results ==
=== Regular season ===
1963–64 regular season
October: 4–5–0 (home: 3–1–0; road: 1–4–0)

Game	October	Opponent	Score	Record
1	9	@ Chicago Black Hawks	3–1	0–1–0
2	12	@ Montreal Canadiens	6–2	0–2–0
3	16	Detroit Red Wings	3–0	1–2–0
4	20	Boston Bruins	5–1	2–2–0
5	24	@ Boston Bruins	2–0	3–2–0
6	26	@ Toronto Maple Leafs	6–4	3–3–0
7	27	Chicago Black Hawks	4–1	3–4–0
8	30	Boston Bruins	4–3	4–4–0
9	31	@ Detroit Red Wings	4–1	4–5–0

November: 2–8–2 (home: 2–3–2; road: 0–5–0)

Game	November	Opponent	Score	Record
10	3	Montreal Canadiens	5–3	4–6–0
11	5	@ Chicago Black Hawks	3–2	4–7–0
12	7	@ Detroit Red Wings	1–0	4–8–0
13	9	@ Montreal Canadiens	4–2	4–9–0
14	14	Toronto Maple Leafs	5–4	4–10–0
15	16	@ Toronto Maple Leafs	5–4	4–11–0
16	17	Detroit Red Wings	5–2	5–11–0
17	20	Boston Bruins	1–1	5–11–1
18	24	Toronto Maple Leafs	3–3	5–11–2
19	27	Detroit Red Wings	3–2	6–11–2
20	28	@ Boston Bruins	5–3	6–12–2
21	30	Chicago Black Hawks	3–2	6–13–2

December: 2–7–4 (home: 2–2–3; road: 0–5–1)

Game	December	Opponent	Score	Record
22	1	@ Chicago Black Hawks	3–3	6–13–3
23	5	@ Montreal Canadiens	4–2	6–14–3
24	7	@ Boston Bruins	8–6	6–15–3
25	8	Boston Bruins	2–2	6–15–4
26	11	Chicago Black Hawks	6–2	6–16–4
27	12	@ Montreal Canadiens	6–4	6–17–4
28	14	@ Toronto Maple Leafs	5–3	6–18–4
29	15	Montreal Canadiens	4–2	7–18–4
30	18	Detroit Red Wings	1–1	7–18–5
31	22	Toronto Maple Leafs	1–1	7–18–6
32	25	@ Detroit Red Wings	4–3	7–19–6
33	27	Chicago Black Hawks	4–2	8–19–6
34	29	Montreal Canadiens	6–2	8–20–6

January: 9–3–1 (home: 4–0–0; road: 5–3–1)

Game	January	Opponent	Score	Record
35	1	@ Chicago Black Hawks	5–2	9–20–6
36	4	Detroit Red Wings	5–2	10–20–6
37	5	Toronto Maple Leafs	3–2	11–20–6
38	9	@ Boston Bruins	5–3	12–20–6
39	12	@ Detroit Red Wings	5–3	12–21–6
40	15	@ Toronto Maple Leafs	5–4	13–21–6
41	18	@ Chicago Black Hawks	6–1	13–22–6
42	19	@ Detroit Red Wings	3–1	14–22–6
43	22	Boston Bruins	6–4	15–22–6
44	23	@ Montreal Canadiens	4–2	15–23–6
45	25	@ Toronto Maple Leafs	1–1	15–23–7
46	26	Detroit Red Wings	3–2	16–23–7
47	30	@ Boston Bruins	3–1	17–23–7

February: 3–9–1 (home: 2–4–1; road: 1–5–0)

Game	February	Opponent	Score	Record
48	1	Chicago Black Hawks	2–2	17–23–8
49	2	Montreal Canadiens	4–2	18–23–8
50	5	Boston Bruins	3–2	18–24–8
51	6	@ Boston Bruins	4–0	18–25–8
52	8	Montreal Canadiens	8–2	18–26–8
53	9	@ Detroit Red Wings	4–2	18–27–8
54	12	@ Chicago Black Hawks	5–2	18–28–8
55	16	Toronto Maple Leafs	4–2	19–28–8
56	19	Chicago Black Hawks	7–2	19–29–8
57	22	@ Toronto Maple Leafs	5–2	19–30–8
58	23	Toronto Maple Leafs	4–3	19–31–8
59	27	@ Boston Bruins	4–2	20–31–8
60	29	@ Montreal Canadiens	4–0	20–32–8

March: 2–6–2 (home: 1–3–2; road: 1–3–0)

Game	March	Opponent	Score	Record
61	1	Detroit Red Wings	2–2	20–32–9
62	4	Chicago Black Hawks	4–3	21–32–9
63	7	@ Montreal Canadiens	3–2	22–32–9
64	8	Montreal Canadiens	0–0	22–32–10
65	11	Boston Bruins	5–3	22–33–10
66	14	@ Toronto Maple Leafs	7–3	22–34–10
67	15	Toronto Maple Leafs	3–1	22–35–10
68	17	@ Chicago Black Hawks	4–0	22–36–10
69	19	@ Detroit Red Wings	9–3	22–37–10
70	22	Montreal Canadiens	2–1	22–38–10

Legend: Win (2 points) Loss (0 points) Tie (1 point)

== Player statistics ==
Skaters

Regular season
Player	GP	G	A	Pts	PIM
Phil Goyette	67	24	41	65	15
Rod Gilbert	70	24	40	64	62
Andy Bathgate^{‡}	56	16	43	59	26
Camille Henry	68	29	26	55	8
Harry Howell	70	5	31	36	75
Jim Neilson	69	5	24	29	93
Earl Ingarfield	63	15	11	26	26
Don McKenney^{‡}	55	9	17	26	6
Vic Hadfield	69	14	11	25	151
Val Fonteyne	69	7	18	25	4
Donnie Marshall	70	11	12	23	8
Larry Cahan	53	4	8	12	80
Don Johns	57	1	9	10	26
Bob Nevin^{†}	14	5	4	9	9
Dick Duff^{†}	14	4	4	8	2
Dick Meissner	35	3	5	8	0
Jean Ratelle	15	0	7	7	6
Albert Langlois^{‡}	44	4	2	6	32
Dave Richardson	34	3	1	4	21
Ron Ingram^{‡}	16	1	3	4	8
Doug Harvey	14	0	2	2	10
Marc Dufour	10	1	0	1	2
Howie Glover	25	1	0	1	9
Rod Seiling	2	0	1	1	0
Mike McMahon	18	0	1	1	16
Donald McGregor	2	0	0	0	2
Ken Schinkel	4	0	0	0	0
Gord Labossiere	15	0	0	0	12

Goaltenders

Regular season
Player	GP	TOI	W	L	T	GA	GAA	SA	SV%	SO
Jacques Plante	65	3900	22	36	7	220	3.38	2442	.910	3
Gilles Villemure	5	300	0	2	3	18	3.60	179	.899	0

^{†}Denotes player spent time with another team before joining Rangers. Stats reflect time with Rangers only.
^{‡}Traded mid-season. Stats reflect time with Rangers only.

Note:

Pos = Position;GP = Games played; G = Goals; A = Assists; Pts = Points; PIM = Penalty minutes; +/- = Plus/minus; PPG = Power-play goals; SHG = Short-handed goals; GWG = Game-winning goals
Pos = Position;GP = Games played; Min, TOI = Minutes played; W = Wins; L = Losses; T,T/OT = Ties; OTL = Overtime losses; GA = Goals-against; GAA = Goals-against average; SO = Shutouts; SA = Shots against; SV = Shots saved;SV% = Save percentage;

== Draft picks ==
New York's picks at the 1963 NHL amateur draft in Montreal, Canada.

Round	#	Player	Nationality	Position	College/Junior/Club team (League)
1	4	Al Osborne	Canada	RW	Weston (OHA Jr. B)
2	10	Terry Jones	Canada	C	Weston (Ont. Midgets)
3	15	Mike Cummins	Canada	F	Georgetown (Ont. Midgets)
4	20	Cam Allison	Canada	D	Portage la Prairie (Man. Jr. A)
