= 1963–64 Detroit Red Wings season =

National Hockey League team season

1963–64 Detroit Red Wings
- League: 4th NHL
- 1963–64 record: 30–29–11
- Home record: 23–9–3
- Road record: 7–20–8
- Goals for: 191
- Goals against: 204

Team information
- General manager: Sid Abel
- Coach: Sid Abel
- Captain: Alex Delvecchio
- Arena: Detroit Olympia

Team leaders
- Goals: Gordie Howe (26)
- Assists: Gordie Howe (47)
- Points: Gordie Howe (73)
- Penalty minutes: Doug Barkley (115)
- Wins: Terry Sawchuk (25)
- Goals against average: Terry Sawchuk (2.64)

The 1963–64 Detroit Red Wings season saw the Red Wings finish in fourth place in the NHL with a record of 30 wins, 29 losses, and 11 ties. They defeated the Chicago Black Hawks in seven games in the Semi-finals before losing a seven-game Stanley Cup Finals to the Toronto Maple Leafs.

== Final standings ==
=== Regular season ===
National Hockey League
		GP	W	L	T	GF	GA	DIFF	Pts
1	Montreal Canadiens	70	36	21	13	209	167	+42	85
2	Chicago Black Hawks	70	36	22	12	218	169	+49	84
3	Toronto Maple Leafs	70	33	25	12	192	172	+20	78
4	Detroit Red Wings	70	30	29	11	191	204	−13	71
5	New York Rangers	70	22	38	10	186	242	−56	54
6	Boston Bruins	70	18	40	12	170	212	−42	48

=== Record vs. opponents ===
1963–64 NHL Records
Team	BOS	CHI	DET	MTL	NYR	TOR
Boston	—	3–9–2	3–10–1	2–7–5	5–7–2	5–7–2
Chicago	9–3–2	—	5–6–3	7–5–2	9–3–2	7–5–2
Detroit	10–3–1	6–5–3	—	5–7–2	6–6–2	3–8–3
Montreal	7–2–5	5–7–2	7–5–2	—	10–3–1	7–5–2
New York	7–5–2	3–9–2	6–6–2	3–10–1	—	3–8–3
Toronto	7–5–2	5–7–2	8–3–3	5–7–2	8–3–3	—

== Schedule and results ==
=== Regular season ===
1963–64 regular season
October: 4–4–1 (home: 4–1–1; road: 0–3–0)

Game	Result	Date	Score	Opponent	Record
1	W	October 10, 1963	5–3	Chicago Black Hawks (1963–64)	1–0–0
2	W	October 13, 1963	3–0	Boston Bruins (1963–64)	2–0–0
3	L	October 16, 1963	0–3	@ New York Rangers (1963–64)	2–1–0
4	L	October 19, 1963	1–2	@ Toronto Maple Leafs (1963–64)	2–2–0
5	W	October 20, 1963	3–2	Toronto Maple Leafs (1963–64)	3–2–0
6	T	October 24, 1963	2–2	Chicago Black Hawks (1963–64)	3–2–1
7	L	October 27, 1963	4–6	Montreal Canadiens (1963–64)	3–3–1
8	L	October 29, 1963	1–5	@ Chicago Black Hawks (1963–64)	3–4–1
9	W	October 31, 1963	4–1	New York Rangers (1963–64)	4–4–1

November: 2–6–2 (home: 2–1–0; road: 0–5–2)

Game	Result	Date	Score	Opponent	Record
10	L	November 2, 1963	1–5	@ Montreal Canadiens (1963–64)	4–5–1
11	L	November 3, 1963	1–4	@ Boston Bruins (1963–64)	4–6–1
12	W	November 7, 1963	1–0	New York Rangers (1963–64)	5–6–1
13	W	November 10, 1963	3–0	Montreal Canadiens (1963–64)	6–6–1
14	T	November 16, 1963	1–1	@ Boston Bruins (1963–64)	6–6–2
15	L	November 17, 1963	2–5	@ New York Rangers (1963–64)	6–7–2
16	L	November 20, 1963	2–5	@ Chicago Black Hawks (1963–64)	6–8–2
17	L	November 27, 1963	2–3	@ New York Rangers (1963–64)	6–9–2
18	L	November 28, 1963	3–7	Montreal Canadiens (1963–64)	6–10–2
19	T	November 30, 1963	1–1	@ Toronto Maple Leafs (1963–64)	6–10–3

December: 6–6–3 (home: 5–4–0; road: 1–2–3)

Game	Result	Date	Score	Opponent	Record
20	L	December 1, 1963	1–4	Toronto Maple Leafs (1963–64)	6–11–3
21	W	December 5, 1963	4–2	Boston Bruins (1963–64)	7–11–3
22	L	December 7, 1963	2–5	@ Montreal Canadiens (1963–64)	7–12–3
23	L	December 8, 1963	3–5	Toronto Maple Leafs (1963–64)	7–13–3
24	W	December 11, 1963	3–1	@ Toronto Maple Leafs (1963–64)	8–13–3
25	W	December 14, 1963	5–4	Chicago Black Hawks (1963–64)	9–13–3
26	T	December 15, 1963	4–4	@ Chicago Black Hawks (1963–64)	9–13–4
27	T	December 18, 1963	1–1	@ New York Rangers (1963–64)	9–13–5
28	W	December 19, 1963	3–0	Boston Bruins (1963–64)	10–13–5
29	L	December 21, 1963	0–2	@ Toronto Maple Leafs (1963–64)	10–14–5
30	L	December 22, 1963	1–6	Montreal Canadiens (1963–64)	10–15–5
31	W	December 25, 1963	4–3	New York Rangers (1963–64)	11–15–5
32	T	December 28, 1963	1–1	@ Montreal Canadiens (1963–64)	11–15–6
33	W	December 29, 1963	2–1	Boston Bruins (1963–64)	12–15–6
34	L	December 31, 1963	4–5	Toronto Maple Leafs (1963–64)	12–16–6

January: 5–5–2 (home: 3–1–1; road: 2–4–1)

Game	Result	Date	Score	Opponent	Record
35	L	January 4, 1964	2–5	@ New York Rangers (1963–64)	12–17–6
36	T	January 5, 1964	3–3	Montreal Canadiens (1963–64)	12–17–7
37	W	January 7, 1964	5–0	@ Boston Bruins (1963–64)	13–17–7
38	W	January 9, 1964	5–3	Chicago Black Hawks (1963–64)	14–17–7
39	L	January 11, 1964	3–6	@ Chicago Black Hawks (1963–64)	14–18–7
40	W	January 12, 1964	5–3	New York Rangers (1963–64)	15–18–7
41	L	January 16, 1964	1–5	@ Boston Bruins (1963–64)	15–19–7
42	W	January 18, 1964	2–0	@ Montreal Canadiens (1963–64)	16–19–7
43	L	January 19, 1964	1–3	New York Rangers (1963–64)	16–20–7
44	W	January 25, 1964	5–3	Chicago Black Hawks (1963–64)	17–20–7
45	L	January 26, 1964	2–3	@ New York Rangers (1963–64)	17–21–7
46	T	January 29, 1964	2–2	@ Chicago Black Hawks (1963–64)	17–21–8

February: 7–5–2 (home: 5–1–1; road: 2–4–1)

Game	Result	Date	Score	Opponent	Record
47	L	February 1, 1964	3–9	@ Montreal Canadiens (1963–64)	17–22–8
48	T	February 2, 1964	2–2	Toronto Maple Leafs (1963–64)	17–22–9
49	L	February 5, 1964	2–4	@ Chicago Black Hawks (1963–64)	17–23–9
50	W	February 6, 1964	4–0	Chicago Black Hawks (1963–64)	18–23–9
51	W	February 8, 1964	3–2	@ Boston Bruins (1963–64)	19–23–9
52	W	February 9, 1964	4–2	New York Rangers (1963–64)	20–23–9
53	W	February 13, 1964	4–1	Boston Bruins (1963–64)	21–23–9
54	W	February 15, 1964	4–1	@ Montreal Canadiens (1963–64)	22–23–9
55	L	February 16, 1964	2–5	Montreal Canadiens (1963–64)	22–24–9
56	T	February 19, 1964	1–1	@ Toronto Maple Leafs (1963–64)	22–24–10
57	W	February 22, 1964	3–2	Boston Bruins (1963–64)	23–24–10
58	W	February 23, 1964	3–2	Montreal Canadiens (1963–64)	24–24–10
59	L	February 27, 1964	2–4	@ Chicago Black Hawks (1963–64)	24–25–10
60	L	February 29, 1964	1–2	@ Boston Bruins (1963–64)	24–26–10

March: 6–3–1 (home: 4–1–0; road: 2–2–1)

Game	Result	Date	Score	Opponent	Record
61	T	March 1, 1964	2–2	@ New York Rangers (1963–64)	24–26–11
62	W	March 3, 1964	3–2	Toronto Maple Leafs (1963–64)	25–26–11
63	W	March 5, 1964	7–5	@ Montreal Canadiens (1963–64)	26–26–11
64	L	March 7, 1964	2–4	@ Toronto Maple Leafs (1963–64)	26–27–11
65	W	March 8, 1964	5–3	@ Boston Bruins (1963–64)	27–27–11
66	W	March 12, 1964	2–1	Boston Bruins (1963–64)	28–27–11
67	W	March 15, 1964	5–3	Chicago Black Hawks (1963–64)	29–27–11
68	W	March 19, 1964	9–3	New York Rangers (1963–64)	30–27–11
69	L	March 21, 1964	3–5	@ Toronto Maple Leafs (1963–64)	30–28–11
70	L	March 22, 1964	1–4	Toronto Maple Leafs (1963–64)	30–29–11

Legend: Win (2 points) Loss (0 points) Tie (1 point)

=== Playoffs ===
1964 Stanley Cup playoffs
Semifinals vs. (2) Chicago Black Hawks: Red Wings win 4–3

Game	Result	Date	Score	OT	Opponent	Series
1	L	March 26, 1964	1–4		@ Chicago Black Hawks (1963–64)	0–1
2	W	March 29, 1964	5–4		@ Chicago Black Hawks (1963–64)	1–1
3	W	March 31, 1964	3–0		Chicago Black Hawks (1963–64)	2–1
4	L	April 2, 1964	2–3	OT	Chicago Black Hawks (1963–64)	2–2
5	L	April 5, 1964	2–3		@ Chicago Black Hawks (1963–64)	2–3
6	W	April 7, 1964	7–2		Chicago Black Hawks (1963–64)	3–3
7	W	April 9, 1964	4–2		@ Chicago Black Hawks (1963–64)	4–3

Stanley Cup Finals vs. (3) Toronto Maple Leafs: Maple Leafs win 4–3

Game	Result	Date	Score	OT	Opponent	Series
1	L	April 11, 1964	2–3		@ Toronto Maple Leafs (1963–64)	0–1
2	W	April 14, 1964	4–3	OT	@ Toronto Maple Leafs (1963–64)	1–1
3	W	April 16, 1964	4–3		Toronto Maple Leafs (1963–64)	2–1
4	L	April 18, 1964	2–4		Toronto Maple Leafs (1963–64)	2–2
5	W	April 21, 1964	2–1		@ Toronto Maple Leafs (1963–64)	3–2
6	L	April 23, 1964	3–4	OT	Toronto Maple Leafs (1963–64)	3–3
7	L	April 25, 1964	0–4		@ Toronto Maple Leafs (1963–64)	3–4

Legend: Win Loss Tie

== Player statistics ==
=== Regular season ===
Scoring

Player	Pos	GP	G	A	Pts	PIM
Gordie Howe	RW	69	26	47	73	70
Alex Delvecchio	C/LW	70	23	30	53	11
Norm Ullman	C	61	21	30	51	55
Parker MacDonald	C	68	21	25	46	25
Doug Barkley	D	67	11	21	32	115
Bruce MacGregor	C	63	11	21	32	15
Floyd Smith	RW	52	18	13	31	22
Larry Jeffrey	LW	58	10	18	28	87
Andre Pronovost	LW	70	7	16	23	54
Pit Martin	C	50	9	12	21	28
Marcel Pronovost	D	67	3	17	20	42
Bill Gadsby	D	64	2	16	18	80
Eddie Joyal	C	47	10	7	17	6
Alex Faulkner	C	30	5	7	12	9
Ron Ingram	D	50	3	6	9	50
Albert Langlois	D	17	1	6	7	13
Paul Henderson	RW	32	3	3	6	14
Claude Laforge	LW	17	2	3	5	4
Lowell MacDonald	LW	10	1	4	5	0
Irv Spencer	D	25	3	0	3	8
John MacMillan	RW	20	0	3	3	6
Art Stratton	C/LW	5	0	3	3	2
Billy McNeill	RW	15	1	1	2	2
John Miszuk	D	42	0	2	2	30
Ted Hampson	C	7	0	1	1	0
Wayne Muloin	D	3	0	1	1	2
Hank Bassen	G	1	0	0	0	0
Roger Crozier	G	15	0	0	0	0
Ian Cushenan	D	5	0	0	0	4
Warren Godfrey	D	4	0	0	0	2
Pete Goegan	D	12	0	0	0	8
Harrison Gray	G	1	0	0	0	0
Ron Harris	D	3	0	0	0	7
Howie Menard	C	3	0	0	0	0
Bill Mitchell	D	1	0	0	0	0
Pat Rupp	G	1	0	0	0	0
Terry Sawchuk	G	53	0	0	0	0
Jim Watson	D	1	0	0	0	0

Goaltending

Player	MIN	GP	W	L	T	GA	GAA	SO
Terry Sawchuk	3140	53	25	20	7	138	2.64	5
Roger Crozier	900	15	5	6	4	51	3.40	2
Hank Bassen	60	1	0	1	0	4	4.00	0
Harrison Gray	40	1	0	1	0	5	7.50	0
Pat Rupp	60	1	0	1	0	4	4.00	0
Team:	4200	70	30	29	11	202	2.89	7

=== Playoffs ===
Scoring

Player	Pos	GP	G	A	Pts	PIM
Gordie Howe	RW	14	9	10	19	16
Norm Ullman	C	14	7	10	17	6
Alex Delvecchio	C/LW	14	3	8	11	0
Bruce MacGregor	C	14	5	2	7	12
Andre Pronovost	LW	14	4	3	7	26
Floyd Smith	RW	14	4	3	7	4
Larry Jeffrey	LW	14	1	6	7	28
Parker MacDonald	C	14	3	3	6	2
Paul Henderson	RW	14	2	3	5	6
Eddie Joyal	C	14	2	3	5	10
Pit Martin	C	14	1	4	5	14
Doug Barkley	D	14	0	5	5	33
Bill Gadsby	D	14	0	4	4	22
Marcel Pronovost	D	14	0	2	2	14
John MacMillan	RW	4	0	1	1	2
Bob Champoux	G	1	0	0	0	0
Roger Crozier	G	3	0	0	0	0
Bob Dillabough	C	1	0	0	0	0
Alex Faulkner	C	4	0	0	0	0
Albert Langlois	D	14	0	0	0	12
John Miszuk	D	3	0	0	0	2
Terry Sawchuk	G	13	0	0	0	2
Irv Spencer	D	11	0	0	0	0

Goaltending

Player	MIN	GP	W	L	GA	GAA	SO
Terry Sawchuk	677	13	6	5	31	2.75	1
Bob Champoux	55	1	1	0	4	4.36	0
Roger Crozier	126	3	0	2	5	2.38	0
Team:	858	14	7	7	40	2.80	1

Note: Pos = Position; GP = Games played; G = Goals; A = Assists; Pts = Points; +/- = Plus-minus PIM = Penalty minutes; PPG = Power-play goals; SHG = Short-handed goals; GWG = Game-winning goals;
MIN = Minutes played; W = Wins; L = Losses; T = Ties; GA = Goals against; GAA = Goals-against average; SO = Shutouts;

== Draft picks ==
Detroit's draft picks at the 1963 NHL amateur draft held at the Queen Elizabeth Hotel in Montreal.

Round	#	Player	Nationality	College/Junior/Club team (League)
1	2	Peter Mahovlich	Canada	St. Michael's Buzzers (MetJHL)
2	8	Bill Cosburn	Canada	Bick's Pickles Midgets (OAAAMHL)
