= 1963–64 Toronto Maple Leafs season =

NHL hockey team season (won Stanley Cup)

1963–64 Toronto Maple Leafs
- Stanley Cup champions
- League: 3rd NHL
- 1963–64 record: 33–25–12
- Home record: 22–7–6
- Road record: 11–18–6
- Goals for: 192
- Goals against: 172

Team information
- General manager: Punch Imlach
- Coach: Punch Imlach
- Captain: George Armstrong
- Arena: Maple Leaf Gardens

Team leaders
- Goals: Frank Mahovlich (26)
- Assists: Dave Keon (37)
- Points: Dave Keon (60)
- Penalty minutes: Eddie Shack (128)
- Wins: Johnny Bower (24)
- Goals against average: Johnny Bower (2.11)

The 1963–64 Toronto Maple Leafs season was Toronto's 47th season in the National Hockey League (NHL), and resulted in the team winning their 12th Stanley Cup.

== Regular season ==
On November 8, 1963: Maple Leaf Gardens would be the first arena in the NHL to have separate penalty boxes.

=== Season standings ===
National Hockey League
		GP	W	L	T	GF	GA	DIFF	Pts
1	Montreal Canadiens	70	36	21	13	209	167	+42	85
2	Chicago Black Hawks	70	36	22	12	218	169	+49	84
3	Toronto Maple Leafs	70	33	25	12	192	172	+20	78
4	Detroit Red Wings	70	30	29	11	191	204	−13	71
5	New York Rangers	70	22	38	10	186	242	−56	54
6	Boston Bruins	70	18	40	12	170	212	−42	48

=== Record vs. opponents ===
1963–64 NHL Records
Team	BOS	CHI	DET	MTL	NYR	TOR
Boston	—	3–9–2	3–10–1	2–7–5	5–7–2	5–7–2
Chicago	9–3–2	—	5–6–3	7–5–2	9–3–2	7–5–2
Detroit	10–3–1	6–5–3	—	5–7–2	6–6–2	3–8–3
Montreal	7–2–5	5–7–2	7–5–2	—	10–3–1	7–5–2
New York	7–5–2	3–9–2	6–6–2	3–10–1	—	3–8–3
Toronto	7–5–2	5–7–2	8–3–3	5–7–2	8–3–3	—

=== Schedule and results ===
1963–64 regular season
October: 5–3–0 (home: 4–0–0; road: 1–3–0)

Game	Result	Date	Score	Opponent	Record	Pts
1	W	October 12, 1963	5–1	Boston Bruins (1963–64)	1–0–0	2
2	L	October 13, 1963	2–4	@ Chicago Black Hawks (1963–64)	1–1–0	2
3	W	October 16, 1963	4–2	@ Montreal Canadiens (1963–64)	2–1–0	4
4	W	October 19, 1963	2–1	Detroit Red Wings (1963–64)	3–1–0	6
5	L	October 20, 1963	2–3	@ Detroit Red Wings (1963–64)	3–2–0	6
6	W	October 26, 1963	6–4	New York Rangers (1963–64)	4–2–0	8
7	L	October 27, 1963	0–2	@ Boston Bruins (1963–64)	4–3–0	8
8	W	October 30, 1963	6–3	Montreal Canadiens (1963–64)	5–3–0	10

November: 4–4–4 (home: 2–2–2; road: 2–2–2)

Game	Result	Date	Score	Opponent	Record	Pts
9	L	November 2, 1963	0–2	Chicago Black Hawks (1963–64)	5–4–0	10
10	W	November 7, 1963	4–3	@ Boston Bruins (1963–64)	6–4–0	12
11	T	November 9, 1963	3–3	Chicago Black Hawks (1963–64)	6–4–1	13
12	T	November 13, 1963	2–2	@ Montreal Canadiens (1963–64)	6–4–2	14
13	W	November 14, 1963	5–4	@ New York Rangers (1963–64)	7–4–2	16
14	W	November 16, 1963	5–4	New York Rangers (1963–64)	8–4–2	18
15	L	November 17, 1963	0–6	@ Chicago Black Hawks (1963–64)	8–5–2	18
16	L	November 20, 1963	1–3	Montreal Canadiens (1963–64)	8–6–2	18
17	W	November 23, 1963	4–1	Boston Bruins (1963–64)	9–6–2	20
18	T	November 24, 1963	3–3	@ New York Rangers (1963–64)	9–6–3	21
19	L	November 28, 1963	0–2	@ Chicago Black Hawks (1963–64)	9–7–3	21
20	T	November 30, 1963	1–1	Detroit Red Wings (1963–64)	9–7–4	22

December: 9–3–2 (home: 5–1–0; road: 4–2–2)

Game	Result	Date	Score	Opponent	Record	Pts
21	W	December 1, 1963	4–1	@ Detroit Red Wings (1963–64)	10–7–4	24
22	W	December 4, 1963	3–0	Montreal Canadiens (1963–64)	11–7–4	26
23	W	December 7, 1963	3–0	Chicago Black Hawks (1963–64)	12–7–4	28
24	W	December 8, 1963	5–3	@ Detroit Red Wings (1963–64)	13–7–4	30
25	L	December 11, 1963	1–3	Detroit Red Wings (1963–64)	13–8–4	30
26	W	December 14, 1963	5–3	New York Rangers (1963–64)	14–8–4	32
27	T	December 15, 1963	4–4	@ Boston Bruins (1963–64)	14–8–5	33
28	L	December 18, 1963	3–7	@ Montreal Canadiens (1963–64)	14–9–5	33
29	W	December 21, 1963	2–0	Detroit Red Wings (1963–64)	15–9–5	35
30	T	December 22, 1963	1–1	@ New York Rangers (1963–64)	15–9–6	36
31	W	December 25, 1963	5–1	@ Boston Bruins (1963–64)	16–9–6	38
32	W	December 28, 1963	2–0	Boston Bruins (1963–64)	17–9–6	40
33	L	December 29, 1963	0–2	@ Chicago Black Hawks (1963–64)	17–10–6	40
34	W	December 31, 1963	5–4	@ Detroit Red Wings (1963–64)	18–10–6	42

January: 4–7–1 (home: 3–3–1; road: 1–4–0)

Game	Result	Date	Score	Opponent	Record	Pts
35	W	January 4, 1964	3–0	Chicago Black Hawks (1963–64)	19–10–6	44
36	L	January 5, 1964	2–3	@ New York Rangers (1963–64)	19–11–6	44
37	W	January 8, 1964	6–1	Montreal Canadiens (1963–64)	20–11–6	46
38	W	January 11, 1964	3–1	Boston Bruins (1963–64)	21–11–6	48
39	L	January 12, 1964	3–6	@ Boston Bruins (1963–64)	21–12–6	48
40	L	January 15, 1964	4–5	New York Rangers (1963–64)	21–13–6	48
41	L	January 18, 1964	0–11	Boston Bruins (1963–64)	21–14–6	48
42	W	January 19, 1964	2–0	@ Chicago Black Hawks (1963–64)	22–14–6	50
43	L	January 22, 1964	0–3	Montreal Canadiens (1963–64)	22–15–6	50
44	T	January 25, 1964	1–1	New York Rangers (1963–64)	22–15–7	51
45	L	January 26, 1964	0–2	@ Boston Bruins (1963–64)	22–16–7	51
46	L	January 29, 1964	1–2	@ Montreal Canadiens (1963–64)	22–17–7	51

February: 5–5–3 (home: 4–1–2; road: 1–4–1)

Game	Result	Date	Score	Opponent	Record	Pts
47	W	February 1, 1964	5–1	Boston Bruins (1963–64)	23–17–7	53
48	T	February 2, 1964	2–2	@ Detroit Red Wings (1963–64)	23–17–8	54
49	L	February 5, 1964	0–2	Montreal Canadiens (1963–64)	23–18–8	54
50	T	February 8, 1964	3–3	Chicago Black Hawks (1963–64)	23–18–9	55
51	L	February 9, 1964	1–2	@ Chicago Black Hawks (1963–64)	23–19–9	55
52	L	February 12, 1964	0–4	@ Montreal Canadiens (1963–64)	23–20–9	55
53	W	February 15, 1964	4–0	Chicago Black Hawks (1963–64)	24–20–9	57
54	L	February 16, 1964	2–4	@ New York Rangers (1963–64)	24–21–9	57
55	T	February 19, 1964	1–1	Detroit Red Wings (1963–64)	24–21–10	58
56	W	February 22, 1964	5–2	New York Rangers (1963–64)	25–21–10	60
57	W	February 23, 1964	4–3	@ New York Rangers (1963–64)	26–21–10	62
58	L	February 26, 1964	0–1	@ Montreal Canadiens (1963–64)	26–22–10	62
59	W	February 29, 1964	4–1	Chicago Black Hawks (1963–64)	27–22–10	64

March: 6–3–2 (home: 4–0–1; road: 2–3–1)

Game	Result	Date	Score	Opponent	Record	Pts
60	L	March 1, 1964	3–5	@ Boston Bruins (1963–64)	27–23–10	64
61	L	March 3, 1964	2–3	@ Detroit Red Wings (1963–64)	27–24–10	64
62	T	March 4, 1964	4–4	Boston Bruins (1963–64)	27–24–11	65
63	W	March 7, 1964	4–2	Detroit Red Wings (1963–64)	28–24–11	67
64	L	March 8, 1964	3–4	@ Chicago Black Hawks (1963–64)	28–25–11	67
65	W	March 11, 1964	1–0	Montreal Canadiens (1963–64)	29–25–11	69
66	W	March 14, 1964	7–3	New York Rangers (1963–64)	30–25–11	71
67	W	March 15, 1964	3–1	@ New York Rangers (1963–64)	31–25–11	73
68	T	March 18, 1964	2–2	@ Montreal Canadiens (1963–64)	31–25–12	74
69	W	March 21, 1964	5–3	Detroit Red Wings (1963–64)	32–25–12	76
70	W	March 22, 1964	4–1	@ Detroit Red Wings (1963–64)	33–25–12	78

Legend: Win (2 points) Loss (0 points) Tie (1 point)

=== Player statistics ===
Scoring

Player	GP	G	A	Pts	PIM
Dave Keon	70	23	37	60	6
Frank Mahovlich	70	26	29	55	66
Bob Pulford	70	18	30	48	73
Red Kelly	70	11	34	45	16
George Armstrong	66	20	17	37	14
Tim Horton	70	9	20	29	71
Allan Stanley	70	6	21	27	60
Eddie Shack	64	11	10	21	128
Ron Stewart	65	14	5	19	46
Jim Pappin	50	11	8	19	33
Bob Nevin	49	7	12	19	26
Billy Harris	63	6	12	18	17
Bob Baun	52	4	14	18	113
Andy Bathgate	15	3	15	18	8
Dick Duff	52	7	10	17	59
Don McKenney	15	9	6	15	2
Carl Brewer	57	4	9	13	114
Larry Hillman	33	0	4	4	31
Ed Litzenberger	19	2	0	2	0
Gerry Ehman	4	1	1	2	0
Al Arbour	6	0	1	1	0
Kent Douglas	43	0	1	1	29
Johnny Bower	51	0	0	0	4
Arnie Brown	4	0	0	0	6
Ron Ellis	1	0	0	0	0
John MacMillan	13	0	0	0	4
Don Simmons	21	0	0	0	0
Pete Stemkowski	1	0	0	0	2

Goaltending

Player	MIN	GP	W	L	T	GA	GAA	SA	SV	SV%	SO
Johnny Bower	3009	51	24	16	11	106	2.11				5
Don Simmons	1191	21	9	9	1	63	3.17				3
Team:	4200	70	33	25	12	169	2.41				8

== Playoffs ==
The team would make the playoffs for the sixth year in a row.

=== Schedule and results ===
1964 Stanley Cup playoffs
Semifinals vs. (1) Montreal Canadiens – Maple Leafs win 4–3

Game	Result	Date	Score	OT	Opponent	Series
1	L	March 26, 1964	0–2		@ Montreal Canadiens (1963–64)	0–1
2	W	March 28, 1964	2–1		@ Montreal Canadiens (1963–64)	1–1
3	L	March 31, 1964	2–3		Montreal Canadiens (1963–64)	1–2
4	W	April 2, 1964	5–3		Montreal Canadiens (1963–64)	2–2
5	L	April 4, 1964	2–4		@ Montreal Canadiens (1963–64)	2–3
6	W	April 7, 1964	3–0		Montreal Canadiens (1963–64)	3–3
7	W	April 9, 1964	3–1		@ Montreal Canadiens (1963–64)	4–3

Stanley Cup Finals vs. (4) Detroit Red Wings – Maple Leafs win 4–3

Game	Result	Date	Score	OT	Opponent	Series
1	W	April 11, 1964	3–2		Detroit Red Wings (1963–64)	1–0
2	L	April 14, 1964	3–4	OT	Detroit Red Wings (1963–64)	1–1
3	L	April 16, 1964	3–4		@ Detroit Red Wings (1963–64)	1–2
4	W	April 18, 1964	4–2		@ Detroit Red Wings (1963–64)	2–2
5	L	April 21, 1964	1–2		Detroit Red Wings (1963–64)	2–3
6	W	April 23, 1964	4–3	OT	@ Detroit Red Wings (1963–64)	3–3
7	W	April 25, 1964	4–0		Detroit Red Wings (1963–64)	4–3

Legend: Win Loss

The final series is famous for the courageous play of Bob Baun. In game six of the Finals, he took a Gordie Howe slapshot on his ankle and had to leave play. He returned in overtime and scored the winning goal. He also played in game seven despite the pain and only after the series was over, was it revealed that he had broken the ankle.

=== Player statistics ===
Scoring

Player	GP	G	A	Pts	PIM
Frank Mahovlich	14	4	11	15	20
George Armstrong	14	5	8	13	10
Red Kelly	14	4	9	13	4
Don McKenney	12	4	8	12	0
Dave Keon	14	7	2	9	2
Andy Bathgate	14	5	4	9	25
Bob Pulford	14	5	3	8	20
Allan Stanley	14	1	6	7	20
Bob Baun	14	2	3	5	42
Tim Horton	14	0	4	4	20
Ron Stewart	14	0	4	4	24
Billy Harris	9	1	1	2	4
Gerry Ehman	9	1	0	1	4
Carl Brewer	12	0	1	1	30
Eddie Shack	13	0	1	1	25
Al Arbour	1	0	0	0	0
Johnny Bower	14	0	0	0	0
Larry Hillman	11	0	0	0	2
Ed Litzenberger	1	0	0	0	10
Jim Pappin	11	0	0	0	0

Goaltending

Player	MIN	GP	W	L	T	GA	GAA	SA	SV	SV%	SO
Johnny Bower	850	14	8	6		30	2.12				2
Team:	850	14	8	6		30	2.12				2

== Awards and records ==
- Tim Horton, Runner-Up, Norris Trophy

== Transactions ==
The Maple Leafs were involved in the following transactions during the 1963–64 season.

=== Trades ===
August 1, 1963	To Calgary Stampeders (WHL) Cash	To Toronto Maple Leafs Fred Hucul
February 22, 1964	To New York Rangers Dick Duff; Bob Nevin; Arnie Brown; Bill Collins; Rod Seiling	To Toronto Maple Leafs Andy Bathgate; Don McKenney

=== Waivers ===
December 3, 1963	From Detroit Red Wings John MacMillan

== Draft picks ==
Toronto's draft picks at the 1963 NHL amateur draft held at the Queen Elizabeth Hotel in Montreal.

Round	#	Player	Nationality	College/Junior/Club team (League)
1	6	Walt McKechnie	Canada	London Nationals (WJBHL)
2	12	Neil Clairmont	Canada	Parry Sound Midgets (OAAAMHL)
3	17	Jim McKenny	Canada	Toronto Neil McNeill Maroons (MetJHL)
4	21	Gerry Meehan	Canada	Toronto Neil McNeill Maroons (MetJHL)
