= 1956 Memorial Cup =

Canadian junior ice hockey championship

The Memorial Cup trophy

The 1956 Memorial Cup final was the 38th junior ice hockey championship of the Canadian Amateur Hockey Association. The George Richardson Memorial Trophy champions Toronto Marlboros of the Ontario Hockey Association in Eastern Canada competed against the Abbott Cup champions Regina Pats of the Western Canada Junior Hockey League in Western Canada, in a rematch of the 1955 final. In a best-of-seven series, held at Maple Leaf Gardens in Toronto, Ontario, Toronto won their second consecutive Memorial Cup, and third overall, defeating Regina 4 games to 0, with 1 tie.

== Scores ==
- Game 1: Regina 4-4 Toronto
- Game 2: Toronto 5-1 Regina
- Game 3: Toronto 4-2 Regina
- Game 4: Toronto 6-1 Regina
- Game 5: Toronto 7-4 Regina

== Winning roster ==
Bobby Baun, Walt Boyer, Carl Brewer, Len Broderick, Stan Buda, Charlie Burns, Ron Casey, Gary Collins, Jim Crockett, Ron Farnfield, Ken Girard, Gord Haughton, Bill Kennedy, Al MacNeil, Jim Murchie, Harry Neale, Bob Nevin, Bob Pulford. Coach: Turk Broda
