= 1963–64 Montreal Canadiens season =

NHL hockey team season

1963–64 Montreal Canadiens
- Prince of Wales Trophy winners
- League: 1st NHL
- 1963–64 record: 36–21–13
- Home record: 22–7–6
- Road record: 14–14–7
- Goals for: 209
- Goals against: 167

Team information
- General manager: Frank J. Selke
- Coach: Toe Blake
- Captain: Jean Beliveau
- Alternate captains: Bernie Geoffrion; Henri Richard
- Arena: Montreal Forum

Team leaders
- Goals: Jean Beliveau (28)
- Assists: Jean Beliveau (50)
- Points: Jean Beliveau (78)
- Penalty minutes: Terry Harper (149)
- Wins: Charlie Hodge (33)
- Goals against average: Charlie Hodge (2.26)

The 1963–64 Montreal Canadiens season was the club's 55th season of play. The team placed first in the regular season, earning top seed in the playoffs, but lost to the Toronto Maple Leafs in the semifinals.

== Regular season ==
=== Final standings ===
National Hockey League
		GP	W	L	T	GF	GA	DIFF	Pts
1	Montreal Canadiens	70	36	21	13	209	167	+42	85
2	Chicago Black Hawks	70	36	22	12	218	169	+49	84
3	Toronto Maple Leafs	70	33	25	12	192	172	+20	78
4	Detroit Red Wings	70	30	29	11	191	204	−13	71
5	New York Rangers	70	22	38	10	186	242	−56	54
6	Boston Bruins	70	18	40	12	170	212	−42	48

=== Record vs. opponents ===
1963–64 NHL Records
Team	BOS	CHI	DET	MTL	NYR	TOR
Boston	—	3–9–2	3–10–1	2–7–5	5–7–2	5–7–2
Chicago	9–3–2	—	5–6–3	7–5–2	9–3–2	7–5–2
Detroit	10–3–1	6–5–3	—	5–7–2	6–6–2	3–8–3
Montreal	7–2–5	5–7–2	7–5–2	—	10–3–1	7–5–2
New York	7–5–2	3–9–2	6–6–2	3–10–1	—	3–8–3
Toronto	7–5–2	5–7–2	8–3–3	5–7–2	8–3–3	—

== Schedule and results ==
1963–64 regular season
October

Game	Result	Date	Score	Opponent	Record
1	T	October 8, 1963	4–4	@ Boston Bruins	0–0–1
2	W	October 12, 1963	6–2	New York Rangers	1–0–1
3	L	October 16, 1963	2–4	Toronto Maple Leafs	1–1–1
4	W	October 19, 1963	2–0	Boston Bruins	2–1–1
5	L	October 20, 1963	3–5	@ Chicago Black Hawks	2–2–1
6	T	October 26, 1963	1–1	Chicago Black Hawks	2–2–2
7	W	October 27, 1963	6–4	@ Detroit Red Wings	3–2–2
8	L	October 30, 1963	3–6	@ Toronto Maple Leafs	3–3–2

November

Game	Result	Date	Score	Opponent	Record
9	W	November 2, 1963	5–1	Detroit Red Wings	4–3–2
10	W	November 3, 1963	5–3	@ New York Rangers	5–3–2
11	T	November 7, 1963	2–2	Chicago Black Hawks	5–3–3
12	W	November 9, 1963	4–2	New York Rangers	6–3–3
13	L	November 10, 1963	0–3	@ Detroit Red Wings	6–4–3
14	T	November 13, 1963	2–2	Toronto Maple Leafs	6–4–4
15	L	November 16, 1963	2–5	Chicago Black Hawks	6–5–4
16	W	November 17, 1963	3–2	@ Boston Bruins	7–5–4
17	W	November 20, 1963	3–1	@ Toronto Maple Leafs	8–5–4
18	L	November 24, 1963	3–7	@ Chicago Black Hawks	8–6–4
19	W	November 28, 1963	7–3	@ Detroit Red Wings	9–6–4
20	T	November 30, 1963	0–0	Boston Bruins	9–6–5

December

Game	Result	Date	Score	Opponent	Record
21	W	December 1, 1963	3–1	@ Boston Bruins	10–6–5
22	L	December 4, 1963	0–3	@ Toronto Maple Leafs	10–7–5
23	W	December 5, 1963	4–2	New York Rangers	11–7–5
24	W	December 7, 1963	5–2	Detroit Red Wings	12–7–5
25	L	December 8, 1963	0–3	@ Chicago Black Hawks	12–8–5
26	W	December 12, 1963	6–4	New York Rangers	13–8–5
27	W	December 14, 1963	3–1	Boston Bruins	14–8–5
28	L	December 15, 1963	2–4	@ New York Rangers	14–9–5
29	W	December 18, 1963	7–3	Toronto Maple Leafs	15–9–5
30	W	December 21, 1963	3–2	Chicago Black Hawks	16–9–5
31	W	December 22, 1963	6–1	@ Detroit Red Wings	17–9–5
32	L	December 25, 1963	1–3	@ Chicago Black Hawks	17–10–5
33	T	December 28, 1963	1–1	Detroit Red Wings	17–10–6
34	W	December 29, 1963	6–2	@ New York Rangers	18–10–6

January

Game	Result	Date	Score	Opponent	Record
35	T	January 1, 1964	3–3	@ Boston Bruins	18–10–7
36	W	January 4, 1964	5–1	Boston Bruins	19–10–7
37	T	January 5, 1964	3–3	@ Detroit Red Wings	19–10–8
38	L	January 8, 1964	1–6	@ Toronto Maple Leafs	19–11–8
39	W	January 12, 1964	2–1	@ Chicago Black Hawks	20–11–8
40	W	January 16, 1964	1–0	Chicago Black Hawks	21–11–8
41	L	January 18, 1964	0–2	Detroit Red Wings	21–12–8
42	T	January 19, 1964	1–1	@ Boston Bruins	21–12–9
43	W	January 22, 1964	3–0	@ Toronto Maple Leafs	22–12–9
44	W	January 23, 1964	4–2	New York Rangers	23–12–9
45	L	January 25, 1964	0–6	Boston Bruins	23–13–9
46	T	January 26, 1964	2–2	@ Chicago Black Hawks	23–13–10
47	W	January 29, 1964	2–1	Toronto Maple Leafs	24–13–10

February

Game	Result	Date	Score	Opponent	Record
48	W	February 1, 1964	9–3	Detroit Red Wings	25–13–10
49	L	February 2, 1964	2–4	@ New York Rangers	25–14–10
50	W	February 5, 1964	2–0	@ Toronto Maple Leafs	26–14–10
51	W	February 8, 1964	8–2	@ New York Rangers	27–14–10
52	T	February 9, 1964	4–4	@ Boston Bruins	27–14–11
53	W	February 12, 1964	4–0	Toronto Maple Leafs	28–14–11
54	L	February 15, 1964	1–4	Detroit Red Wings	28–15–11
55	W	February 16, 1964	5–2	@ Detroit Red Wings	29–15–11
56	W	February 20, 1964	3–2	Boston Bruins	30–15–11
57	W	February 22, 1964	3–1	Chicago Black Hawks	31–15–11
58	L	February 23, 1964	2–3	@ Detroit Red Wings	31–16–11
59	W	February 26, 1964	1–0	Toronto Maple Leafs	32–16–11
60	W	February 29, 1964	4–0	New York Rangers	33–16–11

March

Game	Result	Date	Score	Opponent	Record
61	L	March 1, 1964	3–4	@ Chicago Black Hawks	33–17–11
62	L	March 5, 1964	5–7	Detroit Red Wings	33–18–11
63	L	March 7, 1964	2–3	New York Rangers	33–19–11
64	T	March 8, 1964	0–0	@ New York Rangers	33–19–12
65	L	March 11, 1964	0–1	@ Toronto Maple Leafs	33–20–12
66	W	March 14, 1964	4–3	Chicago Black Hawks	34–20–12
67	L	March 15, 1964	1–3	@ Boston Bruins	34–21–12
68	T	March 18, 1964	2–2	Toronto Maple Leafs	34–21–13
69	W	March 21, 1964	5–1	Boston Bruins	35–21–13
70	W	March 22, 1964	2–1	@ New York Rangers	36–21–13

Legend: Win (2 points) Loss (0 points) Tie (1 point)

== Playoffs ==
=== Semifinals ===
- March 26, 1964, Toronto Maple Leafs 2 – 0
- March 28, 1964, Toronto Maple Leafs 1 – 2
- March 31, 1964, at Toronto Maple Leafs 3 – 2
- April 2, 1964, at Toronto Maple Leafs 3 – 5
- April 4, 1964, Toronto Maple Leafs 4 – 2
- April 7, 1964, at Toronto Maple Leafs 0 – 3
- April 9, 1964, Toronto Maple Leafs 1 – 3

== Player statistics ==
=== Regular season ===
==== Scoring ====
Player	Pos	GP	G	A	Pts	PIM
Jean Beliveau	C	68	28	50	78	42
Bobby Rousseau	RW	70	25	31	56	32
Henri Richard	C	66	14	39	53	73
John Ferguson	LW	59	18	27	45	125
Dave Balon	LW	70	24	18	42	80
Bernie Geoffrion	RW	55	21	18	39	41
Gilles Tremblay	LW	61	22	15	37	21
Claude Provost	RW	68	15	17	32	37
Jacques Laperriere	D	65	2	28	30	102
Ralph Backstrom	C	70	8	21	29	41
J. C. Tremblay	D	70	5	16	21	24
Bill Hicke	RW	48	11	9	20	41
Terry Harper	D	70	2	15	17	149
Red Berenson	C	69	7	9	16	12
Jean-Guy Talbot	D	66	1	13	14	83
Andre Boudrias	LW	4	1	4	5	2
Yvan Cournoyer	RW	5	4	0	4	0
Claude Larose	RW	21	1	1	2	43
Bryan Watson	D	39	0	2	2	18
Ted Harris	D	4	0	1	1	0
Jim Roberts	D/RW	15	0	1	1	2
Jean Gauthier	D	1	0	0	0	2
Terry Gray	RW	4	0	0	0	6
John Hanna	D	6	0	0	0	2
Wayne Hicks	RW	2	0	0	0	0
Charlie Hodge	G	62	0	0	0	2
Jean-Guy Morissette	G	1	0	0	0	0
Marc Reaume	D	3	0	0	0	2
Leon Rochefort	RW	3	0	0	0	0
Gump Worsley	G	8	0	0	0	0

==== Goaltending ====
Player	MIN	GP	W	L	T	GA	GAA	SO
Charlie Hodge	3720	62	33	18	11	140	2.26	8
Gump Worsley	444	8	3	2	2	22	2.97	1
Jean-Guy Morissette	36	1	0	1	0	4	6.67	0
Team:	4200	70	36	21	13	166	2.37	9

=== Playoffs ===
==== Scoring ====
Player	Pos	GP	G	A	Pts	PIM
Claude Provost	RW	7	2	2	4	22
Ralph Backstrom	C	7	2	1	3	8
J. C. Tremblay	D	7	2	1	3	9
Jean Beliveau	C	5	2	0	2	18
Dave Balon	LW	7	1	1	2	25
Bernie Geoffrion	RW	7	1	1	2	4
Jacques Laperriere	D	7	1	1	2	8
Henri Richard	C	7	1	1	2	9
Bobby Rousseau	RW	7	1	1	2	2
Bill Hicke	RW	7	0	2	2	2
Jean-Guy Talbot	D	7	0	2	2	10
Claude Larose	RW	2	1	0	1	0
John Ferguson	LW	7	0	1	1	25
Jim Roberts	D/RW	7	0	1	1	14
Red Berenson	C	7	0	0	0	4
Terry Harper	D	7	0	0	0	6
Charlie Hodge	G	7	0	0	0	0
Gilles Tremblay	LW	2	0	0	0	0
Bryan Watson	D	6	0	0	0	2

==== Goaltending ====
Player	MIN	GP	W	L	GA	GAA	SO
Charlie Hodge	420	7	3	4	16	2.29	1
Team:	420	7	3	4	16	2.29	1

Note:

Pos = Position;GP = Games played; G = Goals; A = Assists; Pts = Points; PIM = Penalty minutes; +/- = Plus/minus; PPG = Power-play goals; SHG = Short-handed goals; GWG = Game-winning goals
Pos = Position;GP = Games played; Min, TOI = Minutes played; W = Wins; L = Losses; T,T/OT = Ties; OTL = Overtime losses; GA = Goals-against; GAA = Goals-against average; SO = Shutouts; SA = Shots against; SV = Shots saved;SV% = Save percentage;

== Transactions ==
- June 4, 1963 – Jacques Plante was traded to the New York Rangers, along with Phil Goyette and Don Marshall, in exchange for Gump Worsley, Dave Balon, and Leon Rochefort.

== Draft picks ==
Montreal's draft picks at the 1963 NHL amateur draft held at the Queen Elizabeth Hotel in Montreal.

Round	#	Player	Nationality	College/Junior/Club team (League)
1	1	Garry Monahan	Canada	St. Michael's Buzzers (MetJHL)
2	7	Rodney Presswood	Canada	Georgetown Midgets (OAAAMHL)
3	13	Roy Pugh	Canada	Aurora Bears (SOJCHL)

== See also ==
- 1963–64 NHL season
