= 1963–64 Boston Bruins season =

NHL team season

1963–64 Boston Bruins
- League: 6th NHL
- 1963–64 record: 18–40–12
- Home record: 13–15–7
- Road record: 5–25–5
- Goals for: 170
- Goals against: 212

Team information
- General manager: Lynn Patrick
- Coach: Milt Schmidt
- Captain: Leo Boivin
- Arena: Boston Garden

Team leaders
- Goals: Murray Oliver (24)
- Assists: Murray Oliver (44)
- Points: Murray Oliver (68)
- Penalty minutes: Ted Green (145)
- Wins: Ed Johnston (18)
- Goals against average: Ed Johnston (3.01)

The 1963–64 Boston Bruins season was the 40th season for the franchise. The Bruins missed the playoffs for the fifth consecutive season for the first time in franchise history. Goaltender Ed Johnston appeared in every game, becoming the final goaltender in NHL history to play every minute of every game.

== Regular season ==
=== Final standings ===
National Hockey League
| | | GP | W | L | T | GF | GA | DIFF | Pts |
|---|---|---|---|---|---|---|---|---|---|
| 1 | Montreal Canadiens | 70 | 36 | 21 | 13 | 209 | 167 | +42 | 85 |
| 2 | Chicago Black Hawks | 70 | 36 | 22 | 12 | 218 | 169 | +49 | 84 |
| 3 | Toronto Maple Leafs | 70 | 33 | 25 | 12 | 192 | 172 | +20 | 78 |
| 4 | Detroit Red Wings | 70 | 30 | 29 | 11 | 191 | 204 | −13 | 71 |
| 5 | New York Rangers | 70 | 22 | 38 | 10 | 186 | 242 | −56 | 54 |
| 6 | Boston Bruins | 70 | 18 | 40 | 12 | 170 | 212 | −42 | 48 |

=== Record vs. opponents ===
1963–64 NHL Records
| Team | BOS | CHI | DET | MTL | NYR | TOR |
|---|---|---|---|---|---|---|
| Boston | — | 3–9–2 | 3–10–1 | 2–7–5 | 5–7–2 | 5–7–2 |
| Chicago | 9–3–2 | — | 5–6–3 | 7–5–2 | 9–3–2 | 7–5–2 |
| Detroit | 10–3–1 | 6–5–3 | — | 5–7–2 | 6–6–2 | 3–8–3 |
| Montreal | 7–2–5 | 5–7–2 | 7–5–2 | — | 10–3–1 | 7–5–2 |
| New York | 7–5–2 | 3–9–2 | 6–6–2 | 3–10–1 | — | 3–8–3 |
| Toronto | 7–5–2 | 5–7–2 | 8–3–3 | 5–7–2 | 8–3–3 | — |

== Schedule and results ==
1963–64 regular season
October

| Game | Result | Date | Score | Opponent | Record |
|---|---|---|---|---|---|
| 1 | T | October 8, 1963 | 4–4 | Montreal Canadiens (1963–64) | 0–0–1 |
| 2 | L | October 12, 1963 | 1–5 | @ Toronto Maple Leafs (1963–64) | 0–1–1 |
| 3 | L | October 13, 1963 | 0–3 | @ Detroit Red Wings (1963–64) | 0–2–1 |
| 4 | L | October 16, 1963 | 2–5 | @ Chicago Black Hawks (1963–64) | 0–3–1 |
| 5 | L | October 19, 1963 | 0–2 | @ Montreal Canadiens (1963–64) | 0–4–1 |
| 6 | L | October 20, 1963 | 1–5 | @ New York Rangers (1963–64) | 0–5–1 |
| 7 | L | October 24, 1963 | 0–2 | New York Rangers (1963–64) | 0–6–1 |
| 8 | W | October 27, 1963 | 2–0 | Toronto Maple Leafs (1963–64) | 1–6–1 |
| 9 | L | October 30, 1963 | 3–4 | @ New York Rangers (1963–64) | 1–7–1 |

November

| Game | Result | Date | Score | Opponent | Record |
|---|---|---|---|---|---|
| 10 | W | November 3, 1963 | 4–1 | Detroit Red Wings (1963–64) | 2–7–1 |
| 11 | L | November 7, 1963 | 3–4 | Toronto Maple Leafs (1963–64) | 2–8–1 |
| 12 | W | November 10, 1963 | 4–2 | Chicago Black Hawks (1963–64) | 3–8–1 |
| 13 | L | November 13, 1963 | 4–6 | @ Chicago Black Hawks (1963–64) | 3–9–1 |
| 14 | T | November 16, 1963 | 1–1 | Detroit Red Wings (1963–64) | 3–9–2 |
| 15 | L | November 17, 1963 | 2–3 | Montreal Canadiens (1963–64) | 3–10–2 |
| 16 | T | November 20, 1963 | 1–1 | @ New York Rangers (1963–64) | 3–10–3 |
| 17 | L | November 23, 1963 | 1–4 | @ Toronto Maple Leafs (1963–64) | 3–11–3 |
| 18 | W | November 28, 1963 | 5–3 | New York Rangers (1963–64) | 4–11–3 |
| 19 | T | November 30, 1963 | 0–0 | @ Montreal Canadiens (1963–64) | 4–11–4 |

December

| Game | Result | Date | Score | Opponent | Record |
|---|---|---|---|---|---|
| 20 | L | December 1, 1963 | 1–3 | Montreal Canadiens (1963–64) | 4–12–4 |
| 21 | T | December 4, 1963 | 2–2 | @ Chicago Black Hawks (1963–64) | 4–12–5 |
| 22 | L | December 5, 1963 | 2–4 | @ Detroit Red Wings (1963–64) | 4–13–5 |
| 23 | W | December 7, 1963 | 8–6 | New York Rangers (1963–64) | 5–13–5 |
| 24 | T | December 8, 1963 | 2–2 | @ New York Rangers (1963–64) | 5–13–6 |
| 25 | W | December 12, 1963 | 2–1 | Chicago Black Hawks (1963–64) | 6–13–6 |
| 26 | L | December 14, 1963 | 1–3 | @ Montreal Canadiens (1963–64) | 6–14–6 |
| 27 | T | December 15, 1963 | 4–4 | Toronto Maple Leafs (1963–64) | 6–14–7 |
| 28 | W | December 18, 1963 | 2–1 | @ Chicago Black Hawks (1963–64) | 7–14–7 |
| 29 | L | December 19, 1963 | 0–3 | @ Detroit Red Wings (1963–64) | 7–15–7 |
| 30 | L | December 22, 1963 | 1–4 | Chicago Black Hawks (1963–64) | 7–16–7 |
| 31 | L | December 25, 1963 | 1–5 | Toronto Maple Leafs (1963–64) | 7–17–7 |
| 32 | L | December 28, 1963 | 0–2 | @ Toronto Maple Leafs (1963–64) | 7–18–7 |
| 33 | L | December 29, 1963 | 1–2 | @ Detroit Red Wings (1963–64) | 7–19–7 |

January

| Game | Result | Date | Score | Opponent | Record |
|---|---|---|---|---|---|
| 34 | T | January 1, 1964 | 3–3 | Montreal Canadiens (1963–64) | 7–19–8 |
| 35 | L | January 4, 1964 | 1–5 | @ Montreal Canadiens (1963–64) | 7–20–8 |
| 36 | L | January 5, 1964 | 3–5 | @ Chicago Black Hawks (1963–64) | 7–21–8 |
| 37 | L | January 7, 1964 | 0–5 | Detroit Red Wings (1963–64) | 7–22–8 |
| 38 | L | January 9, 1964 | 3–5 | New York Rangers (1963–64) | 7–23–8 |
| 39 | L | January 11, 1964 | 1–3 | @ Toronto Maple Leafs (1963–64) | 7–24–8 |
| 40 | W | January 12, 1964 | 6–3 | Toronto Maple Leafs (1963–64) | 8–24–8 |
| 41 | W | January 16, 1964 | 5–1 | Detroit Red Wings (1963–64) | 9–24–8 |
| 42 | W | January 18, 1964 | 11–0 | @ Toronto Maple Leafs (1963–64) | 10–24–8 |
| 43 | T | January 19, 1964 | 1–1 | Montreal Canadiens (1963–64) | 10–24–9 |
| 44 | L | January 22, 1964 | 4–6 | @ New York Rangers (1963–64) | 10–25–9 |
| 45 | L | January 23, 1964 | 1–3 | Chicago Black Hawks (1963–64) | 10–26–9 |
| 46 | W | January 25, 1964 | 6–0 | @ Montreal Canadiens (1963–64) | 11–26–9 |
| 47 | W | January 26, 1964 | 2–0 | Toronto Maple Leafs (1963–64) | 12–26–9 |
| 48 | L | January 30, 1964 | 1–3 | New York Rangers (1963–64) | 12–27–9 |

February

| Game | Result | Date | Score | Opponent | Record |
|---|---|---|---|---|---|
| 49 | L | February 1, 1964 | 1–5 | @ Toronto Maple Leafs (1963–64) | 12–28–9 |
| 50 | L | February 2, 1964 | 2–5 | Chicago Black Hawks (1963–64) | 12–29–9 |
| 51 | W | February 5, 1964 | 3–2 | @ New York Rangers (1963–64) | 13–29–9 |
| 52 | W | February 6, 1964 | 4–0 | New York Rangers (1963–64) | 14–29–9 |
| 53 | L | February 8, 1964 | 2–3 | Detroit Red Wings (1963–64) | 14–30–9 |
| 54 | T | February 9, 1964 | 4–4 | Montreal Canadiens (1963–64) | 14–30–10 |
| 55 | L | February 13, 1964 | 1–4 | @ Detroit Red Wings (1963–64) | 14–31–10 |
| 56 | L | February 16, 1964 | 3–5 | @ Chicago Black Hawks (1963–64) | 14–32–10 |
| 57 | L | February 20, 1964 | 2–3 | @ Montreal Canadiens (1963–64) | 14–33–10 |
| 58 | L | February 22, 1964 | 2–3 | @ Detroit Red Wings (1963–64) | 14–34–10 |
| 59 | L | February 23, 1964 | 0–2 | @ Chicago Black Hawks (1963–64) | 14–35–10 |
| 60 | L | February 27, 1964 | 2–4 | New York Rangers (1963–64) | 14–36–10 |
| 61 | W | February 29, 1964 | 2–1 | Detroit Red Wings (1963–64) | 15–36–10 |

March

| Game | Result | Date | Score | Opponent | Record |
|---|---|---|---|---|---|
| 62 | W | March 1, 1964 | 5–3 | Toronto Maple Leafs (1963–64) | 16–36–10 |
| 63 | T | March 4, 1964 | 4–4 | @ Toronto Maple Leafs (1963–64) | 16–36–11 |
| 64 | T | March 5, 1964 | 4–4 | Chicago Black Hawks (1963–64) | 16–36–12 |
| 65 | L | March 8, 1964 | 3–5 | Detroit Red Wings (1963–64) | 16–37–12 |
| 66 | W | March 11, 1964 | 5–3 | @ New York Rangers (1963–64) | 17–37–12 |
| 67 | L | March 12, 1964 | 1–2 | @ Detroit Red Wings (1963–64) | 17–38–12 |
| 68 | W | March 15, 1964 | 3–1 | Montreal Canadiens (1963–64) | 18–38–12 |
| 69 | L | March 21, 1964 | 1–5 | @ Montreal Canadiens (1963–64) | 18–39–12 |
| 70 | L | March 22, 1964 | 3–4 | Chicago Black Hawks (1963–64) | 18–40–12 |

Legend: Win (2 points) Loss (0 points) Tie (1 point)

== Player statistics ==
=== Regular season ===
Scoring

| Player | Pos | GP | G | A | Pts | PIM |
|---|---|---|---|---|---|---|
| Murray Oliver | C | 70 | 24 | 44 | 68 | 41 |
| John Bucyk | LW | 62 | 18 | 36 | 54 | 36 |
| Dean Prentice | LW | 70 | 23 | 16 | 39 | 37 |
| Orland Kurtenbach | C | 70 | 12 | 25 | 37 | 91 |
| Doug Mohns | LW/D | 70 | 9 | 17 | 26 | 95 |
| Forbes Kennedy | C | 70 | 8 | 17 | 25 | 95 |
| Tom Johnson | D | 70 | 4 | 21 | 25 | 33 |
| Leo Boivin | D | 65 | 10 | 14 | 24 | 42 |
| Andy Hebenton | RW | 70 | 12 | 11 | 23 | 8 |
| Tommy Williams | RW | 37 | 8 | 15 | 23 | 8 |
| Gary Dornhoefer | RW | 32 | 12 | 10 | 22 | 20 |
| Bobby Leiter | C | 56 | 6 | 13 | 19 | 43 |
| Jean-Guy Gendron | LW | 54 | 5 | 13 | 18 | 43 |
| Ted Green | D | 70 | 4 | 10 | 14 | 145 |
| Jerry Toppazzini | RW | 65 | 7 | 4 | 11 | 15 |
| Bob McCord | D | 65 | 1 | 9 | 10 | 49 |
| Wayne Rivers | RW | 12 | 2 | 7 | 9 | 6 |
| Ed Westfall | D/RW | 55 | 1 | 5 | 6 | 35 |
| Wayne Connelly | C | 26 | 2 | 3 | 5 | 12 |
| Ron Schock | C | 5 | 1 | 2 | 3 | 0 |
| Don Awrey | D | 16 | 1 | 0 | 1 | 4 |
| Bob Beckett | C | 7 | 0 | 1 | 1 | 0 |
| Ted Irvine | LW | 1 | 0 | 0 | 0 | 0 |
| Eddie Johnston | G | 70 | 0 | 0 | 0 | 0 |
| Skip Krake | C | 2 | 0 | 0 | 0 | 0 |

Goaltending

| Player | MIN | GP | W | L | T | GA | GAA | SO |
|---|---|---|---|---|---|---|---|---|
| Eddie Johnston | 4200 | 70 | 18 | 40 | 12 | 211 | 3.01 | 6 |
| Team: | 4200 | 70 | 18 | 40 | 12 | 211 | 3.01 | 6 |

Note:

Pos = Position;GP = Games played; G = Goals; A = Assists; Pts = Points; PIM = Penalty minutes; +/- = Plus/minus; PPG = Power-play goals; SHG = Short-handed goals; GWG = Game-winning goals
Pos = Position;GP = Games played; Min, TOI = Minutes played; W = Wins; L = Losses; T,T/OT = Ties; OTL = Overtime losses; GA = Goals-against; GAA = Goals-against average; SO = Shutouts; SA = Shots against; SV = Shots saved;SV% = Save percentage;

== Draft picks ==
Boston's picks at the 1963 NHL entry draft, which was the first amateur draft in league history, picking 16-year-olds. None of the players picked ever played professional hockey.

| Round | Player | Nationality | Position | College/junior/club team (league) |
|---|---|---|---|---|
| 1 | Orest Romashyna | West Germany | LW | New Hamburg (Junior C) |
| 2 | Terrance Lane | Canada | – | Georgetown Midgets |
| 3 | Roger Bamburak | Canada | RW | Isaac Brock |
| 4 | Jim Blair | Canada | LW | Georgetown Midgets |
