= 1955 Memorial Cup =

Canadian junior ice hockey championship

The Memorial Cup trophy

The 1955 Memorial Cup final was the 37th junior ice hockey championship of the Canadian Amateur Hockey Association. The George Richardson Memorial Trophy champions Toronto Marlboros of the Ontario Hockey Association in Eastern Canada competed against the Abbott Cup champions Regina Pats of the Western Canada Junior Hockey League in Western Canada. In a best-of-seven series, held at Regina Exhibition Stadium in Regina, Saskatchewan, Toronto won their 2nd Memorial Cup, and first since 1929 by defeating Regina 4 games to 1.

== Scores ==
- Game 1: Thursday April 21, 1955, Regina 3-1 Toronto
- Game 2: Saturday April 23, 1955, Toronto 5-2 Regina
- Game 3: Monday April 25, 1955, Toronto 3-2 Regina
- Game 4: Wednesday April 27, 1955, Toronto 3-2 Regina (OT)
- Game 5: Friday April 29, 1955, Toronto 8-5 Regina

== Winning roster ==
John Albani, Gary Aldcorn, Bobby Baun, Ron Casey, Gary Collins, Glenn Cressman, Bob Dodds, Ken Girard, Billy Harris, Gerry James, Ron Kendall, Bill Kennedy, Al MacNeil, Mike Nykoluk, Gord Onotsky, Bob Pulford, Jake Smola, Ross Sneddon. Coach: Turk Broda
