= Al Langlois =

Canadian ice hockey player (1934–2020)

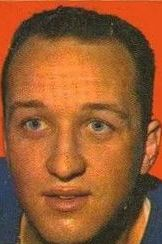
- Born: November 6, 1934 Magog, Quebec, Canada
- Died: September 19, 2020 (aged 85) California, U.S.
- Height: 6 ft 0 in (183 cm)
- Weight: 205 lb (93 kg; 14 st 9 lb)
- Position: Defence
- Shot: Left
- Played for: Montreal Canadiens; New York Rangers; Detroit Red Wings; Boston Bruins
- Playing career: 1955–1966

Joseph Albert Oliver "Junior" Langlois (November 6, 1934 – September 19, 2020) was a Canadian ice hockey defenceman. He played in the National Hockey League with four teams between 1958 and 1966.

Langlois started his NHL career with the Montreal Canadiens in 1958 and ended in 1966 with the Boston Bruins.

He was the last Bruins player to wear #4 before Bobby Orr made the number famous.

He also played with the New York Rangers and Detroit Red Wings.

Langlois won the Stanley Cup three times, with Montreal in 1958, 1959 and 1960.

Langlois died on September 19, 2020, at the age of 85 in California.

== Career statistics ==
=== Regular season and playoffs ===
			Regular season					Playoffs
Season	Team	League	GP	G	A	Pts	PIM	GP	G	A	Pts	PIM
1952–53	Quebec Citadelles	QJHL	9	0	0	0	0	—	—	—	—	—
1953–54	Quebec Frontenacs	QJHL	63	2	11	13	84	8	1	2	3	8
1953–54	Quebec Frontenacs	M-Cup	—	—	—	—	—	8	0	4	4	0
1954–55	Quebec Citadelles	QJHL	43	2	18	20	73	9	1	3	4	12
1954–55	Quebec Citadelles	M-Cup	—	—	—	—	—	9	2	0	2	6
1955–56	Shawinigan Cataractes	QHL	64	8	6	14	48	11	2	4	6	14
1956–57	Shawinigan Cataractes	QHL	16	0	2	2	12	—	—	—	—	—
1956–57	Rochester Americans	AHL	47	5	24	29	64	10	0	4	4	18
1957–58	Montreal Canadiens	NHL	1	0	0	0	0	7	0	1	1	4
1957–58	Rochester Americans	AHL	68	0	11	11	88	—	—	—	—	—
1958–59	Montreal Canadiens	NHL	48	0	3	3	26	7	0	0	0	4
1959–60	Montreal Canadiens	NHL	67	1	14	15	48	8	0	3	3	18
1960–61	Montreal Canadiens	NHL	61	1	12	13	56	5	0	0	0	6
1961–62	New York Rangers	NHL	69	7	18	25	90	6	0	1	1	2
1962–63	New York Rangers	NHL	60	2	14	16	62	—	—	—	—	—
1963–64	New York Rangers	NHL	44	4	2	6	32	—	—	—	—	—
1963–64	Baltimore Clippers	AHL	6	1	0	1	6	—	—	—	—	—
1963–64	Detroit Red Wings	NHL	17	1	6	7	13	14	0	0	0	12
1964–65	Detroit Red Wings	NHL	65	1	12	13	107	6	1	0	1	4
1965–66	Boston Bruins	NHL	65	4	10	14	54	—	—	—	—	—
1966–67	Los Angeles Blades	WHL	59	6	34	40	97	—	—	—	—	—
NHL totals			497	21	91	112	488	53	1	5	6	50
