= Bobby Baun =

Canadian ice hockey player (1936–2023)

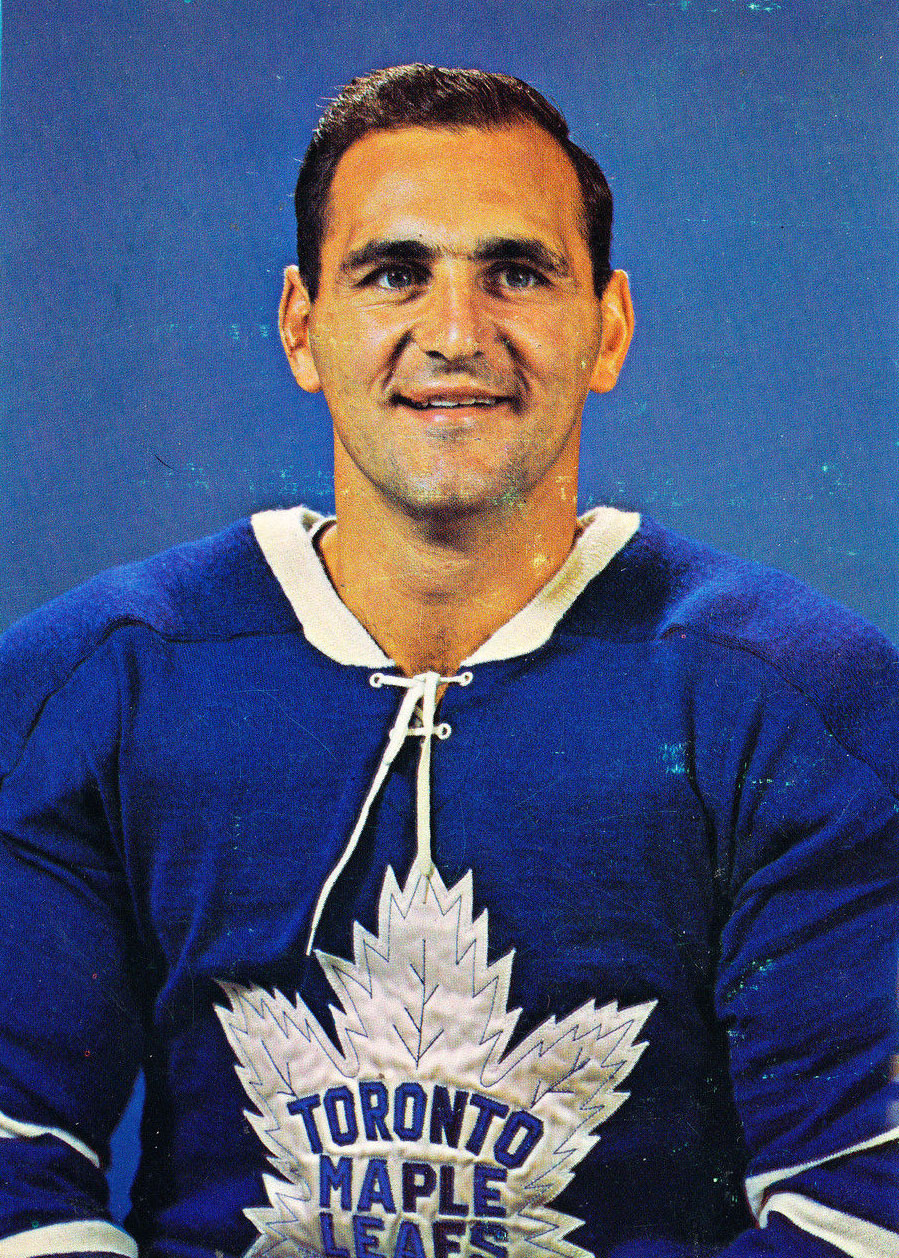
- Baun on a Chex cereal box, c. 1963
- Born: September 9, 1936 Lanigan, Saskatchewan, Canada
- Died: August 14, 2023 (aged 86)
- Height: 5 ft 9 in (175 cm)
- Weight: 182 lb (83 kg; 13 st 0 lb)
- Position: Defence
- Shot: Right
- Played for: Rochester Americans; Toronto Maple Leafs; Oakland Seals; Detroit Red Wings
- Playing career: 1956–1973

Robert Neil Baun (September 9, 1936 – August 14, 2023) was a Canadian professional ice hockey defenceman who played in the National Hockey League (NHL) for 17 seasons from 1956 to 1973. His nickname was "Boomer".

== Playing career ==
Baun played junior hockey with the Toronto Marlboros of the Ontario Hockey Association from 1952 to 1956, winning the Memorial Cup in 1955 and 1956. After turning professional, Baun played most of the 1956–57 season with the Rochester Americans, the Toronto Maple Leafs affiliate in the American Hockey League. They would be the only minor league games Baun would ever play. He was called up to the Leafs during the season and played in Toronto for the next 11 seasons, winning the Stanley Cup in 1962, 1963, 1964, and 1967.

Baun was one of the hardest and cleanest hitters of his time. He was not considered an offensive threat as a defenceman, never scoring more than 20 points in a season in the NHL. His highest single-season goal total was eight in 1959–60. However, Baun is remembered for his performance in game six of the 1963–64 NHL season Stanley Cup finals against the Detroit Red Wings. On April 23, 1964, having fractured his ankle earlier in the game, he returned in overtime and scored the game-winning goal to even the best-of-seven series at 3-3. The Leafs won the next game 4–0 to secure their third consecutive Stanley Cup championship.

Baun developed a reputation for understanding the business side of playing in the NHL in the years before there was a players' union. Eventually, other players sought Baun's advice about their contracts and salaries, which eroded his relationship with Leafs' general manager Punch Imlach. That relationship deteriorated even further when Baun was a holdout for the 1965–66 season. Baun eventually got a raise, but Imlach never forgot it. A series of injuries further dimmed Imlach's enthusiasm for Baun. In 1966–67, Baun suffered a broken toe. Imlach replaced him with Larry Hillman and Baun saw little ice time after that. He was mostly an observer from the bench for the Leafs' 1967 Cup victory, and refused to participate in the celebrations.

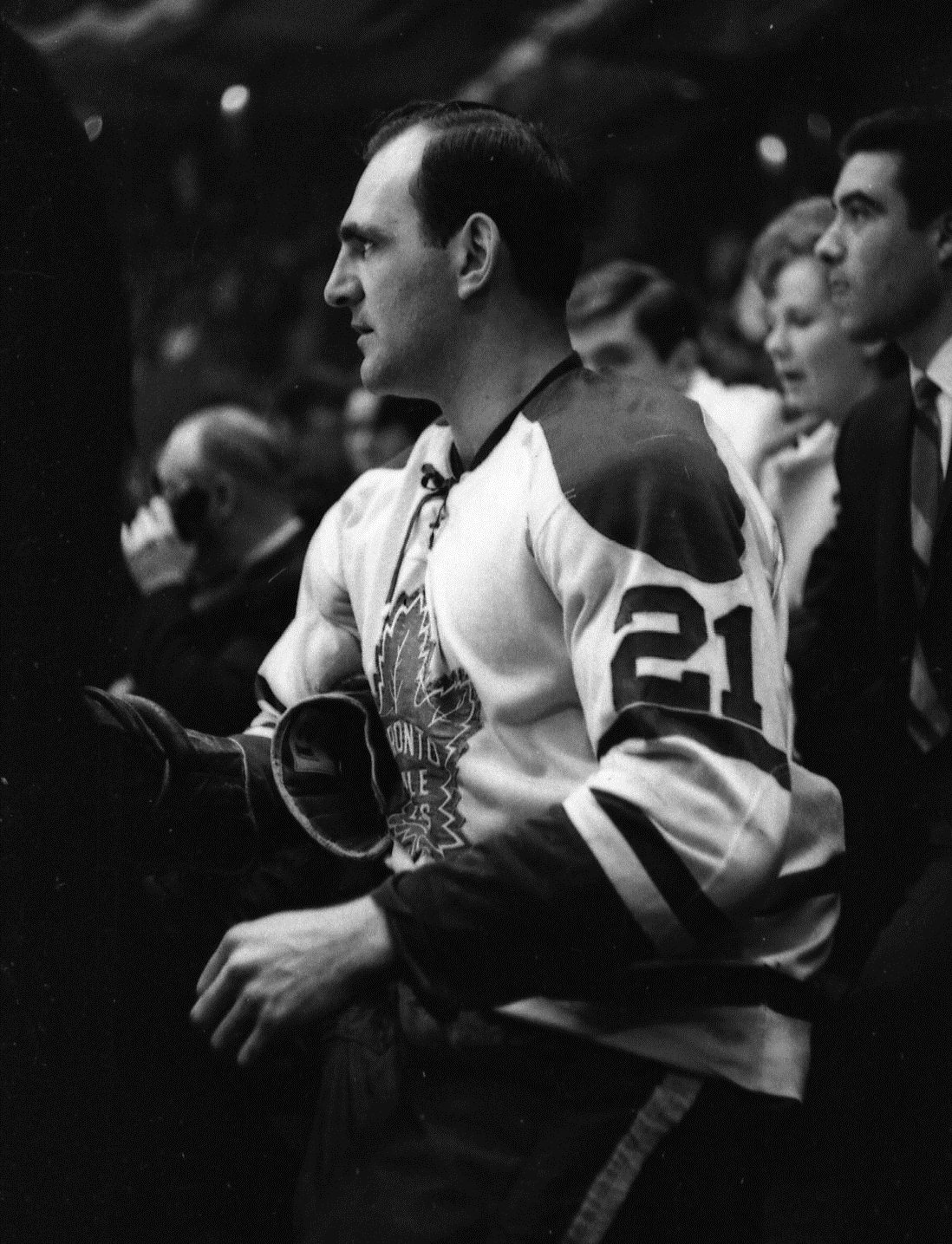
Baun with the Maple Leafs in 1965

Before the next season, Baun was left unprotected in the 1967 NHL Expansion Draft, and was selected by the Oakland Seals. Baun was one of four members of the Memorial Cup-winning Marlboros teams from the mid-1950s to play for the Seals, but the team struggled badly on the ice, particularly on offence, finishing the year with the worst record in the league. Baun asked to be traded back to an Original Six team, and Oakland accommodated his request, dealing him to the Detroit Red Wings in May 1968. Baun played in Detroit for two years but early into the 1970–71 season he found himself at odds with coach Ned Harkness, and was placed on waivers. From there, he was claimed by the Buffalo Sabres, managed by Imlach, who immediately traded him to the St. Louis Blues. Baun refused to report to St. Louis and nine days later was traded back to the Maple Leafs for Brit Selby.

The Leafs benefited from Baun's defensive play, helping Jacques Plante to record a 1.88 goals against average in 1970–71. Baun was just as effective the next season. In the fifth game of the 1972–73 season, he suffered a neck injury after a hit from Mickey Redmond that ended his NHL career at the age of 36.

== Post-Playing Careers ==
Baun retired as a player and ran a cattle farm, but three years later, he was hired as head coach of the Toronto Toros of the World Hockey Association. Mike Nykoluk, another member of the Marlboros in the mid-1950s, had been the team's first choice, but he turned the job down. Playing for the Toros were three of Baun's former Leaf teammates: Frank Mahovlich, Paul Henderson, and Jim Dorey, as well as future NHL stars Mark Napier and Vaclav Nedomansky. But the Toros under Baun had a disastrous year, finishing the 1975–76 season with the worst record in the league. The Toros even finished 11 points behind the Minnesota Fighting Saints—a team that had folded with 21 games left to play in the season. Baun was replaced as coach after the season.

He returned to farming - he'd been "hands-on" with 800 hectares near Pickering before coaching. “Don’t call me a gentleman farmer,” he told sportswriter Paul Hunter in 2004. “I had manure on my boots.”

Owner of three Tim Horton’s donut franchises (he lent Tim some start-up cash and claimed to have sold Horton on the drive-through concept), Baun’s store at Highway 2 and White’s Road in Pickering did the most business in 1987 of 400 outlets in the fast-food chain.

During and after his career, Baun also kept busy as a car salesman, hotel/restaurant owner, real estate agent, and insurance company manager.

Baun said he realized his talent for salesmanship back in his Cub Scout youth on the Prairies. When Apple Day came along, Baun had polished his for three days for the best presentation. He saved enough money by age 15 to buy a Cadillac.

"My other careers were a learning experience, sometimes profitable, sometimes not, but I would not trade any of that," Baun wrote in his autobiography. "But in honest reflection, what has affected my life the most was that goal I scored on April 23, 1964."

== Baun and the NHL pension plan ==
In the 1980s, Baun organized an NHL alumni association and began an investigation into the NHL's pension plan. The plan had been touted to players as the best in professional sports, but after playing in 17 NHL seasons, Baun's pension was only $7,622 a year. Baun received little support from other players, and eventually gave up. Problems with the pension plan were later uncovered through an audit backed by Carl Brewer.

== Awards and honors ==
On June 1, 2007, Baun was awarded an honorary Doctorate of Laws from the University of Ontario Institute of Technology for his work on and off the ice. He resided in Ajax, Ontario.

In 2010, Baun was inducted into the Ontario Sports Hall of Fame.

== Personal life and death ==
Baun was the grandfather of former professional hockey player Kyle Baun, who played five games in the NHL.

Baun died on August 14, 2023, at the age of 86.

== Career statistics ==
			Regular season					Playoffs
Season	Team	League	GP	G	A	Pts	PIM	GP	G	A	Pts	PIM
1952–53	Toronto Marlboros	OHA-Jr.	16	1	1	2	12	7	0	2	2	6
1953–54	Toronto Marlboros	OHA-Jr.	59	2	15	17	63	15	3	0	3	10
1954–55	Toronto Marlboros	OHA-Jr.	47	3	6	9	99	13	0	1	1	31
1954–55	Toronto Marlboros	M-Cup	—	—	—	—	—	11	0	2	2	32
1955–56	Toronto Marlboros	OHA-Jr.	48	5	14	19	93	11	3	2	5	38
1955–56	Toronto Marlboros	M-Cup	—	—	—	—	—	13	1	1	2	39
1956–57	Rochester Americans	AHL	46	2	13	15	117	—	—	—	—	—
1956–57	Toronto Maple Leafs	NHL	20	0	5	5	37	—	—	—	—	—
1957–58	Toronto Maple Leafs	NHL	67	1	9	10	91	—	—	—	—	—
1958–59	Toronto Maple Leafs	NHL	51	1	8	9	87	12	0	0	0	24
1959–60	Toronto Maple Leafs	NHL	61	8	9	17	59	10	1	0	1	17
1960–61	Toronto Maple Leafs	NHL	70	1	14	15	70	3	0	0	0	8
1961–62	Toronto Maple Leafs	NHL	65	4	11	15	94	12	0	3	3	19
1962–63	Toronto Maple Leafs	NHL	48	4	8	12	65	10	0	3	3	6
1963–64	Toronto Maple Leafs	NHL	52	4	14	18	113	14	2	3	5	42
1964–65	Toronto Maple Leafs	NHL	70	0	18	18	160	6	0	1	1	14
1965–66	Toronto Maple Leafs	NHL	44	0	6	6	68	4	0	1	1	8
1966–67	Toronto Maple Leafs	NHL	54	2	8	10	83	10	0	0	0	4
1967–68	Oakland Seals	NHL	67	3	10	13	81	—	—	—	—	—
1968–69	Detroit Red Wings	NHL	76	4	16	20	121	—	—	—	—	—
1969–70	Detroit Red Wings	NHL	71	1	18	19	110	4	0	0	0	0
1970–71	Detroit Red Wings	NHL	11	0	3	3	24	—	—	—	—	—
1970–71	Toronto Maple Leafs	NHL	58	1	17	18	123	6	0	1	1	19
1971–72	Toronto Maple Leafs	NHL	74	2	12	14	101	5	0	0	0	4
1972–73	Toronto Maple Leafs	NHL	5	1	1	2	4	—	—	—	—	—
NHL totals			964	37	187	224	1491	96	3	12	15	165

== Coaching record ==
Team	Year	Regular season						Postseason
Team	Year	G	W	L	T	Pts	Finish	Result
Toronto Toros	1975–76	55	15	35	5	(35)	5th in WHA Canadian	Missed playoffs
Total		55	15	35	5	(35)		

Preceded by Position created	California Seals/Oakland Seals captain 1967–68	Succeeded by Ted Hampson
