= Bill Gadsby =

Canadian ice hockey player (1927–2016)

- Hockey Hall of Fame, 1970
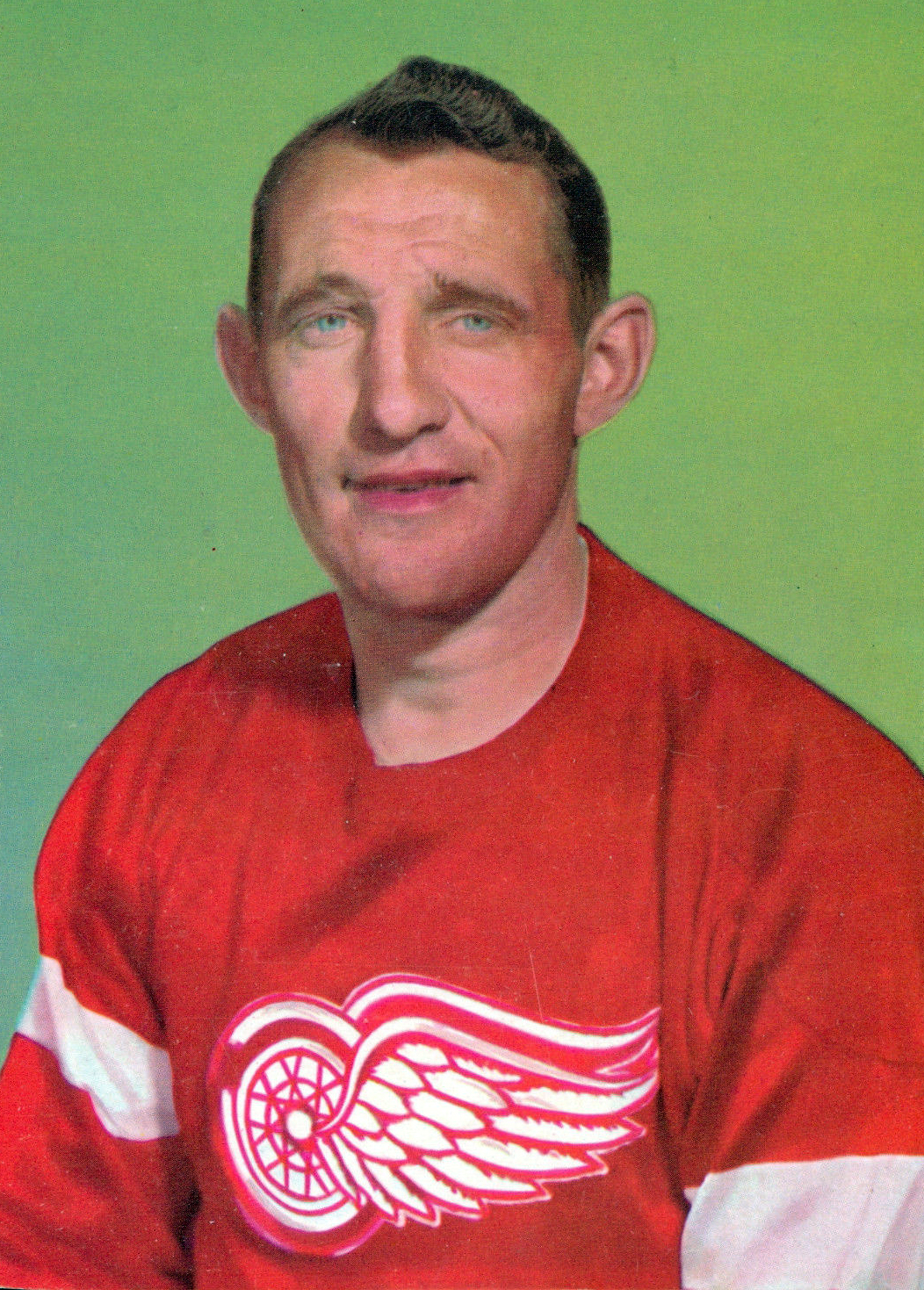
- Gadsby with the Detroit Red Wings, c. 1963
- Born: August 8, 1927 Calgary, Alberta, Canada
- Died: March 10, 2016 (aged 88) Farmington Hills, Michigan, U.S.
- Height: 6 ft 0 in (183 cm)
- Weight: 190 lb (86 kg; 13 st 8 lb)
- Position: Defence
- Shot: Left
- Played for: Chicago Black Hawks; New York Rangers; Detroit Red Wings
- Playing career: 1946–1966

William Alexander Gadsby (August 8, 1927 – March 10, 2016) was a Canadian professional ice hockey defenceman who played for the Chicago Black Hawks, New York Rangers, and Detroit Red Wings in the National Hockey League between 1946 and 1966.

== Playing career ==
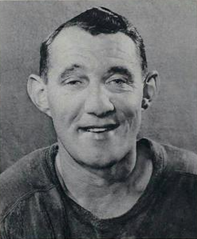
1965 card of Gadsby for Detroit Red Wings

Gadsby began his outstanding hockey career in Calgary playing for several minor league teams including the Alberta Midget champions in 1942. He played two years for the Edmonton Junior Canadians before joining the Chicago Black Hawks in 1946. He was captain twice during his eight years with them. Gadsby contracted polio in 1952 but fought back without interrupting his hockey career, although he spent three weeks in the hospital. That was not his first brush with danger, however—in 1939 he was travelling with his mother on the passenger liner Athenia when it was hit by a torpedo fired by a German U-boat and sank, and he and his mother spent several hours in a lifeboat before being rescued.

Gadsby was a First Team All-Star three times and a Second Team All-Star four times. In 1958–59, he set a record for assists by a defenceman, with 46.

Despite a long (20 seasons) NHL hockey career, Gadsby never won the Stanley Cup. He came closest to winning the Cup in 1964, when the Detroit Red Wings lost a seven-game final series to the Toronto Maple Leafs. In 1968, he became head coach of the Red Wings but was fired shortly into his second season.

When he retired he was the leading career scorer among defencemen with 568 points.

Bill Gadsby was inducted to the Alberta Sports Hall of Fame in 1986 as an athlete.

Gadsby was inducted into the Hockey Hall of Fame in 1970. In 1998, he was ranked number 99 on The Hockey News' list of the 100 Greatest Hockey Players. In the 2009 book 100 Ranger Greats, the authors ranked Gadsby at No. 63 all-time of the 901 New York Rangers who had played during the team's first 82 seasons.

== Retirement and death ==
Gadsby was an "Honored Member" of the Detroit Red Wings Alumni Association, and was active in its efforts to raise money for children's charities in Metro Detroit.

He would also return to Canada in the Hockey Offseason to play Baseball for the Calgary Buffalo for parts of three seasons from 1950 to 1954.

He died at the age of 88 on March 10, 2016, in Farmington Hills, Michigan, following a period of failing health.

== Career statistics ==
=== Regular season and playoffs ===
			Regular season					Playoffs
Season	Team	League	GP	G	A	Pts	PIM	GP	G	A	Pts	PIM
1943–44	Calgary Grills	AHA-B	9	4	1	5	4	—	—	—	—	—
1944–45	Edmonton Canadians	AJHL	—	—	—	—	—	—	—	—	—	—
1945–46	Edmonton Canadians	AJHL	—	14	12	26	—	—	—	—	—	—
1945–46	Edmonton Canadians	M-Cup	—	—	—	—	—	14	12	5	17	22
1946–47	Chicago Black Hawks	NHL	48	8	10	18	31	—	—	—	—	—
1946–47	Kansas City Pla-Mors	USHL	12	2	3	5	8	—	—	—	—	—
1947–48	Chicago Black Hawks	NHL	60	6	10	16	66	—	—	—	—	—
1948–49	Chicago Black Hawks	NHL	50	3	10	13	85	—	—	—	—	—
1949–50	Chicago Black Hawks	NHL	70	10	25	35	138	—	—	—	—	—
1950–51	Chicago Black Hawks	NHL	25	3	7	10	32	—	—	—	—	—
1951–52	Chicago Black Hawks	NHL	59	7	15	22	87	—	—	—	—	—
1952–53	Chicago Black Hawks	NHL	68	2	20	22	84	7	0	1	1	4
1953–54	Chicago Black Hawks	NHL	70	12	29	41	108	—	—	—	—	—
1954–55	Chicago Black Hawks	NHL	18	3	5	8	17	—	—	—	—	—
1954–55	New York Rangers	NHL	52	8	8	16	44	—	—	—	—	—
1955–56	New York Rangers	NHL	70	9	42	51	84	5	1	3	4	4
1956–57	New York Rangers	NHL	70	4	37	41	72	5	1	2	3	2
1957–58	New York Rangers	NHL	65	14	32	46	48	6	0	3	3	4
1958–59	New York Rangers	NHL	70	5	46	51	56	—	—	—	—	—
1959–60	New York Rangers	NHL	65	9	22	31	60	—	—	—	—	—
1960–61	New York Rangers	NHL	65	9	26	35	49	—	—	—	—	—
1961–62	Detroit Red Wings	NHL	70	7	30	37	88	—	—	—	—	—
1962–63	Detroit Red Wings	NHL	70	4	24	28	116	11	1	4	5	36
1963–64	Detroit Red Wings	NHL	64	2	16	18	80	14	0	4	4	22
1964–65	Detroit Red Wings	NHL	61	0	12	12	122	7	0	3	3	8
1965–66	Detroit Red Wings	NHL	58	5	12	17	72	12	1	3	4	12
NHL totals			1,248	130	438	568	1,539	67	4	23	27	92

== NHL coaching record ==
Team	Year	Regular season						Post season
Team	Year	G	W	L	T	Pts	Finish	Result
Detroit Red Wings	1968–69	76	33	31	12	78	5th in East	Missed playoffs
Detroit Red Wings	1969–70	2	2	0	0	2	3rd in East	Resigned

== See also ==
- List of NHL players with 1,000 games played

Preceded by Jack Stewart	Chicago Black Hawks captain 1952–54	Succeeded by Gus Mortson
Preceded by Sid Abel	Head coach of the Detroit Red Wings; 1968–1970	Succeeded by Sid Abel
