= Don McKenney =

Canadian ice hockey player and coach (1934–2022)

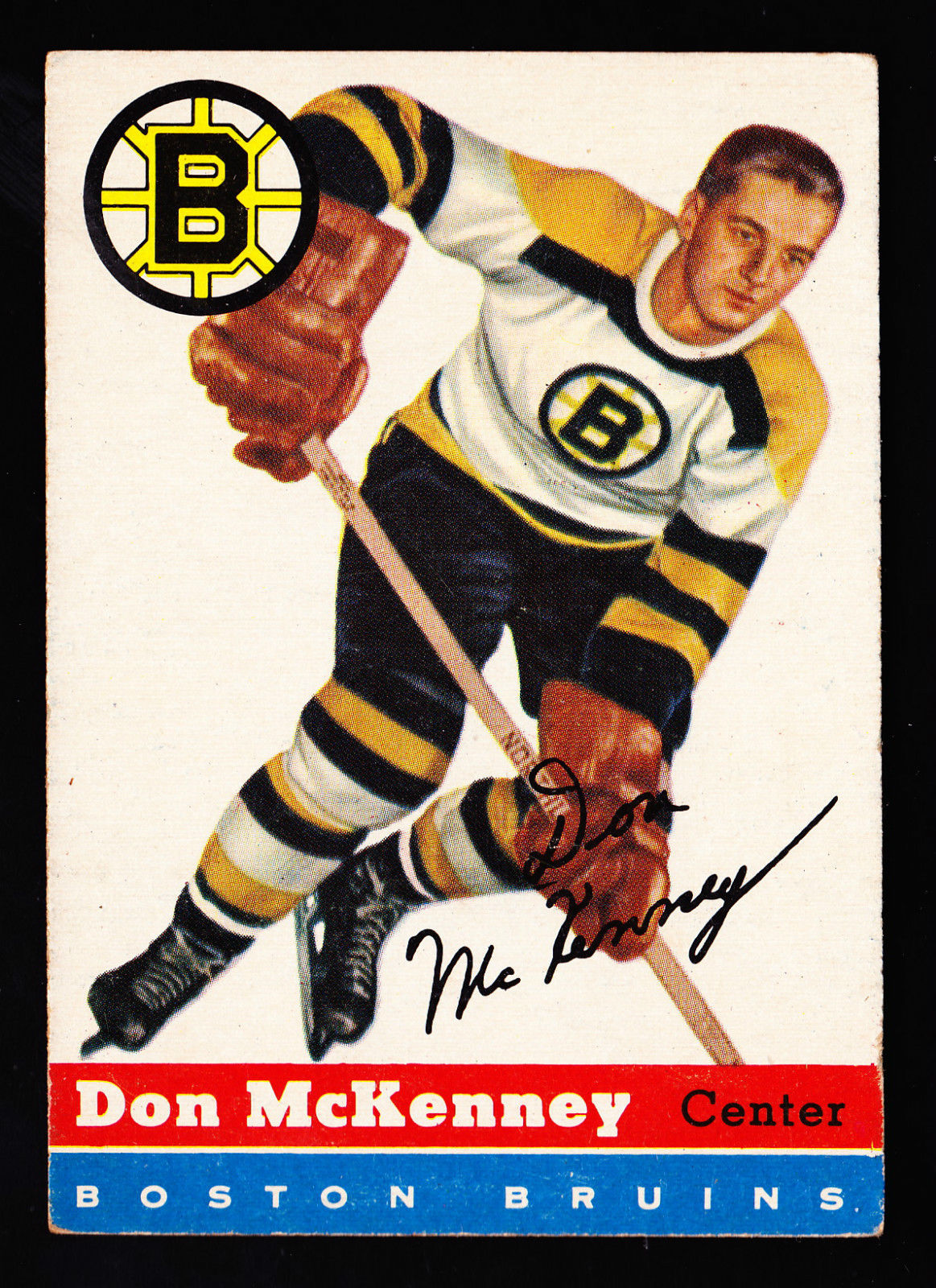
- Born: April 30, 1934 Smiths Falls, Ontario, Canada
- Died: December 19, 2022 (aged 88) Norton, Massachusetts, U.S.
- Height: 6 ft 0 in (183 cm)
- Weight: 175 lb (79 kg; 12 st 7 lb)
- Position: Centre
- Shot: Left
- Played for: Boston Bruins; New York Rangers; Toronto Maple Leafs; Detroit Red Wings; St. Louis Blues
- Playing career: 1953–1970
- Coaching career

Coaching career (HC unless noted)
- 1970–1989: Northeastern (Assistant)
- 1989–1991: Northeastern

Head coaching record
- Overall: 24–44–4 (.361)

Donald Hamilton McKenney (April 30, 1934 – December 19, 2022) was a Canadian ice hockey forward and coach. He played in the National Hockey League (NHL) between 1954 and 1968 with five teams, mostly with the Boston Bruins. After retiring he worked as a coach for Northeastern University for over twenty years.

== Early career ==
Noted as a smooth and classy player, McKenney was signed as a teenager by Harold Cotton, the longtime head scout for the Boston Bruins. He played junior hockey for the OHA Barrie Flyers (a team that was, as was common in the era, sponsored by the Bruins), coached by future Bruins' general manager Hap Emms. McKenney finished second in team scoring in 1952 and third in 1953. In 1953, McKenney was named captain of the Flyers, and led them to their second and final Memorial Cup championship.

McKenney made his professional debut with the Bruins' American Hockey League Hershey Bears farm team in the 1953–54 season. Injuries hampered his play that season, although he played well in the playoffs where the Bears made the Calder Cup finals, losing in six games to eventual champions Cleveland Barons. A baseball prospect who attracted the interest of the Brooklyn Dodgers, McKenney mulled over signing with the Dodgers in the 1954 offseason but opted to continue his hockey career.

== Boston Bruins ==
McKenney was promoted to the Bruins in 1954, and made an immediate impact; he led the team in scoring in 1954–55, finishing second in Calder Memorial Trophy voting for rookie-of-the-year behind Ed Litzenberger of Chicago.

Over the next seven seasons, McKenney led Boston in scoring three more times (and never finished lower than third in team scoring), while his clean, elegant style—and skill as a defensive forward and penalty killer—gained recognition. He finished in the top four in league voting for the Lady Byng Memorial Trophy (awarded for sportsmanship combined with a high level of performance) six straight seasons between 1957 and 1962, won the award in 1960, and was named to play in the All-Star Game in each of those seasons. 1959–60 proved to be McKenney's best season; in addition to the Lady Byng win, he led the league in assists, finished 8th in NHL scoring, and was voted to the Third All-Star Team.

1960 was also the start of the worst stretch in Bruins' history, when the team would miss the playoffs seven seasons in a row, the longest such stretch in NHL history before the 1967 NHL Expansion. While McKenney was named team captain in 1961 after long-time captain Fern Flaman was named as player-coach of the AHL Providence Reds, he was traded to the New York Rangers two seasons later.

In 2023 he would be named one of the top 100 Bruins players of all time.

== Later career ==
By then in decline as a point scorer, he was dealt the season following to the Toronto Maple Leafs. While he was briefly rejuvenated, scoring a point per game for Toronto in 1964 in both the regular season and playoffs en route to the Leafs winning the Stanley Cup (McKenney's sole NHL championship), his decline continued the next season, and the Leafs sent McKenney down to their Rochester Americans minor league team. Following that season, Toronto released him outright, and he was claimed on waivers by the Detroit Red Wings. McKenney played only sporadically for the Red Wings, spending most of his time in the 1965–66 and 1966–67 seasons with their Pittsburgh Hornets AHL affiliate.

When the NHL expanded in 1967, McKenney was drafted in the 9th round of the expansion draft by the St. Louis Blues, a team that focused on drafting veteran players. He played effectively for the Blues, scoring 29 points in 39 games, before a knee injury caused management to send him down to the minors to rehab; it would prove to be his final NHL action.

Hired as a player-assistant coach by the Providence Reds, McKenney led Providence in scoring in 1968–69, and retired after the 1969–70 season.

== Coaching career ==
In 1970, his playing career over, McKenney joined longtime Bruins teammate Fern Flaman on the coaching staff of the Northeastern University Huskies men's hockey team. Don McKenney served nearly two decades as assistant coach and head recruiter. Don McKenney assumed head coaching duties in 1989. Upon retirement in 1991, Northeastern honoured his career with the creation of the Don McKenney Coach's Award, presented in appreciation for dedication, loyalty and friendship to the Northeastern University hockey program. McKenney was inducted in the Northeastern Hall of Fame in 1999. He concluded his active life in hockey as a part-time scout for the NHL Colorado Avalanche.

== Personal life and death ==
In the spring of 1958, McKenney married fellow Smiths Falls, Ontario native and Ottawa schoolteacher, Margaret Gendron. The couple settled in Braintree, Massachusetts, where they raised three Northeastern graduates, daughters Valerie and Deborah and son Scot, who played for the Huskies men's hockey team in the early 1980s.

McKenney died on December 19, 2022, at the age of 88.

== Career statistics ==
=== Regular season and playoffs ===
			Regular season					Playoffs
Season	Team	League	GP	G	A	Pts	PIM	GP	G	A	Pts	PIM
1950–51	Barrie Flyers	OHA	4	0	2	2	6	—	—	—	—	—
1951–52	Barrie Flyers	OHA	52	32	39	71	24	—	—	—	—	—
1952–53	Barrie Flyers	OHA	50	33	33	66	24	15	6	8	14	2
1952–53	Barrie Flyers	M-Cup	—	—	—	—	—	10	9	12	21	4
1953–54	Hershey Bears	AHL	54	13	21	34	4	11	3	5	8	4
1954–55	Boston Bruins	NHL	69	22	20	42	34	5	1	2	3	4
1955–56	Boston Bruins	NHL	65	10	24	34	20	—	—	—	—	—
1956–57	Boston Bruins	NHL	69	21	39	60	31	10	1	5	6	4
1957–58	Boston Bruins	NHL	70	28	30	58	22	12	9	8	17	0
1958–59	Boston Bruins	NHL	70	32	30	62	20	7	2	5	7	0
1959–60	Boston Bruins	NHL	70	20	49	69	28	—	—	—	—	—
1960–61	Boston Bruins	NHL	68	26	23	49	22	—	—	—	—	—
1961–62	Boston Bruins	NHL	70	22	33	55	10	—	—	—	—	—
1962–63	Boston Bruins	NHL	41	14	19	33	2	—	—	—	—	—
1962–63	New York Rangers	NHL	21	8	16	24	4	—	—	—	—	—
1963–64	New York Rangers	NHL	55	9	17	26	6	—	—	—	—	—
1963–64	Toronto Maple Leafs	NHL	15	9	6	15	2	12	4	8	12	0
1964–65	Toronto Maple Leafs	NHL	52	6	13	19	6	6	0	0	0	0
1964–65	Rochester Americans	AHL	18	7	9	16	4	—	—	—	—	—
1965–66	Detroit Red Wings	NHL	24	1	6	7	0	—	—	—	—	—
1965–66	Pittsburgh Hornets	AHL	37	11	19	30	8	3	0	1	1	0
1966–67	Pittsburgh Hornets	AHL	67	26	36	62	16	9	2	7	9	2
1967–68	St. Louis Blues	NHL	39	9	20	29	4	6	1	1	2	2
1967–68	Kansas City Blues	CPHL	11	9	6	15	5	1	0	0	0	0
1968–69	Providence Reds	AHL	74	26	48	74	12	9	4	7	11	0
1969–70	Providence Reds	AHL	31	3	12	15	2	—	—	—	—	—
NHL totals			798	237	345	582	211	58	18	29	47	10

== Head coaching record ==
Record table
Season	Team	Overall	Conference	Standing	Postseason
Northeastern Huskies (Hockey East) (1989–1991)
1989–90	Northeastern	16–19–2	9–10–2	t-5th	Hockey East Quarterfinals
1990–91	Northeastern	8–25–2	3–16–2	8th	Hockey East Semifinals
Northeastern:		24–44–4	12–26–4		
Total:		24–44–4			
National champion Postseason invitational champion Conference regular season champion Conference regular season and conference tournament champion Division regular season champion Division regular season and conference tournament champion Conference tournament champion

== Notes ==
Awards and achievements
Preceded by Alex Delvecchio	Winner of the Lady Byng Trophy; 1960	Succeeded by Red Kelly
Sporting positions
Preceded by Fernie Flaman	Boston Bruins captain 1961–63	Succeeded by Leo Boivin
