= Carl Brewer (ice hockey) =

Canadian ice hockey player (1938–2001)

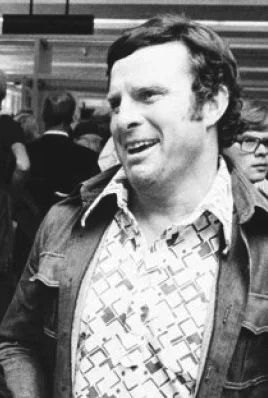
- Born: October 21, 1938 Toronto, Ontario, Canada
- Died: August 25, 2001 (aged 62) Toronto, Ontario, Canada
- Height: 5 ft 10 in (178 cm)
- Weight: 178 lb (81 kg; 12 st 10 lb)
- Position: Defence
- Shot: Left
- Played for: Toronto Maple Leafs; HIFK; Detroit Red Wings; St. Louis Blues; Toronto Toros
- National team: Canada
- Playing career: 1957–1980

Medal record

Representing Canada

Men's ice hockey

Ice Hockey World Championships
Bronze medal – third place	1967 Ice Hockey World Championships	

Carl Thomas Brewer (October 21, 1938 – August 25, 2001) was a Canadian professional ice hockey defenceman. Brewer attended De La Salle College and Riverdale Collegiate Institute prior to his hockey career.

== Career ==
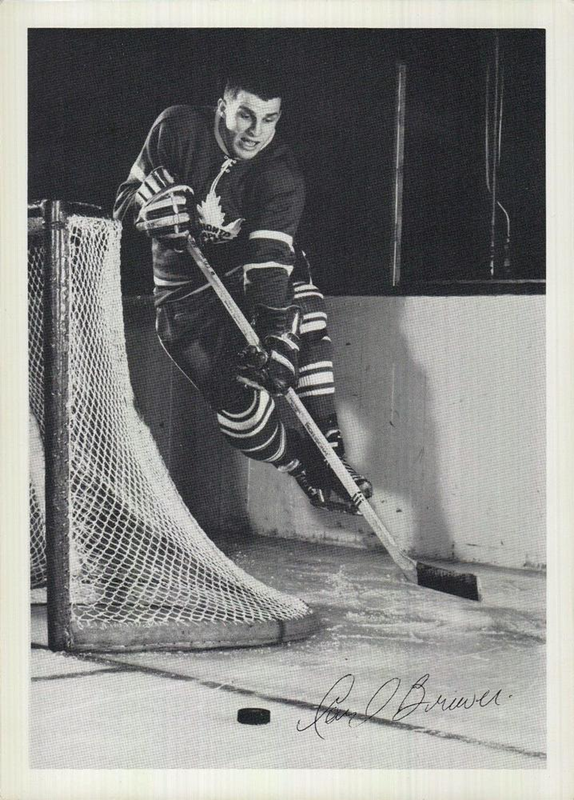
1960-61 card of Brewer for Toronto Maple Leafs

Brewer started his career with the Toronto Maple Leafs in 1958. He also played with the Detroit Red Wings and St. Louis Blues. He won three Stanley Cups with Toronto in 1962, 1963 and 1964. He regained his amateur status after walking out of Maple Leafs training camp in 1965. He retired from the NHL for the first time, stating “my damaged psyche destroyed by [Punch] Imlach would no longer allow me to accommodate playing hockey and being a hockey player.” He returned to studies at the University of Toronto and graduated with a degree in 1966.

He was not eligible to become a professional again until December 18, 1968. In 1966 and 1967 he played with the Canadian National team, winning a bronze medal at the 1967 Ice Hockey World Championships. His contractual rights were traded from the Maple Leafs to the Red Wings for Doug Barrie on March 4, 1968. He was a player-coach with the Muskegon Mohawks at the time of the transaction. He later operated an annual hockey school. His brief stint in HIFK made such an impact on Finnish hockey that he was inducted to the Finnish Hockey Hall of Fame in 2003. After playing a season in Detroit, he played two seasons with the St. Louis Blues before sitting out the 1972–73 season. He played one season in the World Hockey Association with the Toronto Toros and retired again. Nearly six years later, at the age of 41, he returned to the NHL with the Maple Leafs, playing twenty games and logging five assists before retiring for good.

== Post-playing career ==
Brewer spent 17 years investigating National Hockey League pensions and the activities of Alan Eagleson, then executive director of the National Hockey League Player's Association.

In April 1991, he was one of seven players alongside Gordie Howe, Eddie Shack, Andy Bathgate, Bobby Hull, Allan Stanley, and Leo Reise that filed a lawsuit in Canada against not only the NHL Pension Society but also NHL president John Ziegler and every NHL club that alleged the owners had improperly dealt with extra pension money. The following year, a judge ruled in favor of the players and stated the teams must reimburse the money improperly used since 1982.

His determination and efforts alongside longtime companion Susan Foster resulted in Eagleson being convicted and sent to prison for racketeering, fraud and embezzling and the NHL players receiving their entitled diverted pension funds totalling more than $50 million. Brewer was present in the courtroom when Eagleson pled guilty to the charges. A book about their journey to expose Eagleson was written by Foster that included Brewer's notes; it was released in 2006.

== Awards and achievements ==
- Second team All-Star – 1962, 1965, 1970
- First team All-Star – 1963
- Stanley Cup champion – 1962, 1963, 1964
- Finnish Hockey Hall of Fame – 2003
- Canada's Sports Hall of Fame – 2002

== Personal life ==
Brewer died in his sleep on August 25, 2001; he was reported to have heart problems. He was survived by his three children, Mike, Chris, and Anna-Lisa. His Catholic service funeral, held four days later, saw friends, family, and countless hockey-related individuals attend that ranged from Leafs teammate Frank Mahovlich to NHLPA executive director Bob Goodenow.

Carl's son Mike also played professional hockey and was an All-American at Brown in 1992.

== Career statistics ==
=== Regular season and playoffs ===
Bold indicates led league

			Regular season					Playoffs
Season	Team	League	GP	G	A	Pts	PIM	GP	G	A	Pts	PIM
1955–56	Toronto Marlboros	OHA	10	1	3	4	6	11	3	5	8	10
1955–56	Toronto Marlboros	M-Cup	—	—	—	—	—	13	1	2	3	12
1956–57	Toronto Marlboros	OHA	48	8	24	32	154	9	4	3	7	33
1957–58	Toronto Marlboros	OHA	50	10	37	47	212	13	3	9	12	75
1957–58	Toronto Maple Leafs	NHL	2	0	0	0	0	—	—	—	—	—
1957–58	Toronto Marlboros	M-Cup	—	—	—	—	—	5	1	1	2	12
1958–59	Toronto Maple Leafs	NHL	69	3	21	24	125	**12**	0	6	6	**40**
1958–59	Rochester Americans	AHL	1	0	1	1	2	—	—	—	—	—
1959–60	Toronto Maple Leafs	NHL	67	4	19	23	**150**	**10**	2	3	5	16
1960–61	Toronto Maple Leafs	NHL	51	1	14	15	92	5	0	0	0	4
1961–62	Toronto Maple Leafs	NHL	67	1	22	23	89	8	0	2	2	22
1962–63	Toronto Maple Leafs	NHL	**70**	2	23	25	168	10	0	1	1	12
1963–64	Toronto Maple Leafs	NHL	57	4	9	13	114	12	0	1	1	30
1964–65	Toronto Maple Leafs	NHL	**70**	4	23	27	**177**	6	1	2	3	12
1967–68	Muskegon Mohawks	IHL	63	13	55	68	82	9	3	9	12	4
1968–69	HIFK	SM-s	20	4	14	18	53	—	—	—	—	—
1969–70	Detroit Red Wings	NHL	70	2	37	39	51	4	0	0	0	2
1970–71	St. Louis Blues	NHL	19	2	9	11	29	5	0	2	2	8
1971–72	St. Louis Blues	NHL	42	2	16	18	40	—	—	—	—	—
1973–74	Toronto Toros	WHA	77	2	23	25	42	12	0	4	4	11
1979–80	New Brunswick Hawks	AHL	3	0	0	0	0	—	—	—	—	—
1979–80	Toronto Maple Leafs	NHL	20	0	5	5	2	—	—	—	—	—
WHA totals			77	2	23	25	42	12	0	4	4	11
NHL totals			604	25	198	223	1037	72	3	17	20	146
