= 1968 Stanley Cup Final =

1968 ice hockey championship series

	1	2	3	4	Total
St. Louis Blues	2*	0	3*	2	0
Montreal Canadiens	3*	1	4*	3	4
- * – Denotes overtime period(s)
- Location(s): St. Louis: St. Louis Arena (1, 2); Montreal: Montreal Forum (3, 4)
- Coaches: St. Louis: Scotty Bowman; Montreal: Toe Blake
- Captains: St. Louis: Al Arbour; Montreal: Jean Beliveau
- Dates: May 5–11, 1968
- MVP: Glenn Hall (Blues)
- Series-winning goal: J. C. Tremblay (11:40, third)
- Hall of Famers: Canadiens: Jean Beliveau (1972); Yvan Cournoyer (1982); Dick Duff (2006); Jacques Laperriere (1987); Jacques Lemaire (1984); Henri Richard (1979); Serge Savard (1986); Rogie Vachon (2016; did not play); Gump Worsley (1980); Blues: Al Arbour (1996, builder); Glenn Hall (1975); Doug Harvey (1973); Dickie Moore (1974); Coaches: Toe Blake (1966, player); Scotty Bowman (1991)

The 1968 Stanley Cup Final was the championship series of the National Hockey League's (NHL) 1967–68 season, and the culmination of the 1968 Stanley Cup playoffs. It was contested between the Montreal Canadiens and the St. Louis Blues. The Canadiens swept the Blues to win their 15th Stanley Cup championship.

This was the first Stanley Cup Final after the NHL expansion to twelve teams. Although the series was a sweep, it was a much more intense and close-fought series than anyone had expected, as all four games were decided by one goal, two went to overtime, and the other two saw the winning goal scored in the third period. The Blues were the only first-year franchise to play for the Stanley Cup in the post-expansion era, until the Vegas Golden Knights participated in the Stanley Cup Final a half-century later.

== Paths to the Finals ==
This was the first Stanley Cup championship after the 1967 NHL expansion. All of the new teams were placed in the West Division, all the Original Six teams were put in the East Division, and the playoffs were organized so that divisional champions would play off for the Stanley Cup.

Montreal defeated the Boston Bruins and Chicago Black Hawks to advance to the finals as the East Division champion.

St. Louis would defeat the Philadelphia Flyers and Minnesota North Stars to advance to the finals as the West Division champion.

== Game summaries ==
=== Game one ===
May 5	Montreal Canadiens	3–2	OT	St. Louis Blues	St. Louis Arena	Recap

Scoring summary
Period	Team	Goal	Assist(s)	Time	Score
1st	STL	Barclay Plager (2)	Unassisted	09:19	1–0 STL
1st	MTL	Henri Richard (3)	Claude Larose (2)	09:42	1–1
2nd	STL	Dickie Moore (7) – pp	Barclay Plager (5) and Red Berenson (2)	08:16	2–1 STL
2nd	MTL	Yvan Cournoyer (5)	Ted Harris (4) and John Ferguson (3)	09:42	2–2
3rd	None				
OT	MTL	Jacques Lemaire (7)	Unassisted	01:41	3–2 MTL
Penalty summary
Period	Team	Player	Penalty	Time	PIM
1st	STL	Noel Picard	Interference	06:38	2:00
1st	MTL	Carol Vadnais	High-sticking	12:07	2:00
1st	STL	Dickie Moore	High-sticking	12:07	2:00
1st	MTL	Claude Provost	Cross-checking	14:03	2:00
2nd	MTL	Ted Harris	Holding	07:21	2:00
2nd	STL	Dickie Moore	Holding	19:59	2:00
3rd	MTL	John Ferguson	High-sticking	02:23	2:00
3rd	STL	Bob Plager	High-sticking	02:23	2:00
3rd	STL	Barclay Plager	Interference	06:49	2:00
OT	None				

Shots by period
Team	1	2	3	OT	Total
Montreal	13	13	11	1	38
St. Louis	6	18	11	1	36

=== Game two ===
May 7	Montreal Canadiens	1–0	St. Louis Blues	St. Louis Arena	Recap

Scoring summary
Period	Team	Goal	Assist(s)	Time	Score
1st	None				
2nd	None				
3rd	MTL	Serge Savard (1) – sh	Claude Provost (8)	02:17	1–0 MTL
Penalty summary
Period	Team	Player	Penalty	Time	PIM
1st	MTL	John Ferguson	Roughing	04:16	2:00
1st	STL	Barclay Plager	Roughing	04:16	2:00
1st	STL	Gary Sabourin	Slashing	06:07	2:00
1st	MTL	Terry Harper	Cross-checking	12:22	2:00
1st	MTL	Bobby Rousseau	Slashing	15:03	2:00
1st	STL	Bob Plager	Hooking	01:04	2:00
1st	MTL	Ted Harris	Roughing	11:27	2:00
1st	STL	Noel Picard	Slashing	14:49	2:00
1st	STL	Bob Plager	Tripping	16:58	2:00
3rd	MTL	Dick Duff	Elbowing	01:55	2:00
3rd	MTL	Jacques Lemaire	Elbowing	04:43	2:00
3rd	STL	Red Berenson	Slashing	06:07	2:00
3rd	MTL	Jacques Lemaire	Cross-checking	13:21	2:00
3rd	MTL	Bobby Rousseau	Holding	18:05	2:00

Shots by period
Team	1	2	3	Total
Montreal	10	14	12	36
St. Louis	8	8	3	19

=== Game three ===
May 9	St. Louis Blues	3–4	OT	Montreal Canadiens	Montreal Forum	Recap

Glenn Hall was sensational, especially in game three when the Canadiens outshot the Blues 46–15. Wrote Red Burnett, the dean of hockey writers then: "A number of Hall's saves were seemingly impossible. Experts walked out of the Forum convinced no other goaltender had performed so brilliantly in a losing cause." In the overtime of game three, Hall made a spectacular save on Dick Duff and then, standing on his head, made another save. "It was a heartbreaker to see," said Burnett. "After the saves on Duff, Bobby Rousseau came and batted home the second rebound." Hall's heroics even in defeat earned him the Conn Smythe Trophy as the most valuable player in the playoffs.

Scoring summary
Period	Team	Goal	Assist(s)	Time	Score
1st	STL	Frank St. Marseille (5) – pp	Noel Picard (3) and Doug Harvey (4)	10:22	1–0 STL
1st	MTL	Yvan Cournoyer (6) – pp	Henri Richard (4) and John Ferguson (4)	14:24	1–1
2nd	MTL	Serge Savard (2) – sh	Unassisted	01:23	2–1 MTL
2nd	STL	Red Berenson (4)	Jean-Guy Talbot (2)	03:37	2–2
3rd	MTL	Ralph Backstrom (4)	Yvan Cournoyer (7) and John Ferguson (5)	11:43	3–2 MTL
3rd	STL	Red Berenson (5) – sh	Unassisted	17:25	3–3
OT	MTL	Bobby Rousseau (2)	Dick Duff (4)	01:13	4–3 MTL
Penalty summary
Period	Team	Player	Penalty	Time	PIM
1st	MTL	Jacques Laperriere	Charging	08:41	2:00
1st	STL	Jean-Guy Talbot	Cross-checking	13:51	2:00
1st	STL	Barclay Plager	Interference	17:03	2:00
2nd	MTL	Jacques Laperriere	Hooking	01:06	2:00
2nd	STL	Doug Harvey	Holding	06:19	2:00
2nd	STL	Noel Picard	Tripping	15:44	2:00
3rd	STL	Bob Plager	Boarding	16:41	2:00
3rd	STL	Bob Plager	Misconduct	16:41	10:00
OT	None				

Shots by period
Team	1	2	3	OT	Total
St. Louis	7	3	5	0	15
Montreal	11	18	13	4	46

=== Game four ===
May 11	St. Louis Blues	2–3	Montreal Canadiens	Montreal Forum	Recap

With their backs against the wall, the Blues put everything to the test, rallying from an early one-goal deficit to take the lead into the third period. However, Montreal was not to be denied and won the Stanley Cup in game four as J. C. Tremblay fired home the winning goal. When the game ended, the fans came on the ice to celebrate, and balloons, hats and programs were thrown from the stands. Jean Beliveau, in a cast and crutches from his broken ankle, with Ralph Backstrom accepted the Cup from NHL president Clarence Campbell and the players did a victory lap with the Cup.

Scoring summary
Period	Team	Goal	Assist(s)	Time	Score
1st	MTL	Dick Duff (3)	Jacques Lemaire (3)	16:47	1–0 MTL
2nd	STL	Craig Cameron (1)	Tim Ecclestone (2) and Al Arbour (3)	06:53	1–1
2nd	STL	Gary Sabourin (4) – pp	Gary Veneruzzo (2) and Frank St. Marseille (8)	07:50	2–1 STL
3rd	MTL	Henri Richard (4)	J. C. Tremblay (6)	07:24	2–2
3rd	MTL	J. C. Tremblay (3)	Yvan Cournoyer (8) and Ralph Backstrom (3)	11:40	3–2 MTL
Penalty summary
Period	Team	Player	Penalty	Time	PIM
1st	MTL	Ted Harris	High-sticking	06:23	2:00
1st	STL	Bob Plager	Interference	12:03	2:00
2nd	MTL	Terry Harper	Slashing	03:39	2:00
2nd	MTL	Jacques Lemaire	Slashing	06:57	2:00
2nd	STL	Jim Roberts	Tripping	08:16	2:00
2nd	MTL	Bobby Rousseau	Interference	13:16	2:00
2nd	STL	Tim Ecclestone	Tripping	16:45	2:00
2nd	STL	Red Berenson	Holding	18:30	2:00
2nd	MTL	Yvan Cournoyer	Slashing	19:18	2:00
2nd	STL	Doug Harvey	Holding	19:18	2:00
3rd	MTL	Jacques Laperriere	High-sticking	05:41	2:00
3rd	STL	Jean-Guy Talbot	Interference	05:41	2:00

Shots by period
Team	1	2	3	Total
St. Louis	6	9	6	21
Montreal	12	7	12	31

== Aftermath ==
Less than twelve minutes after the Canadiens won the Cup, Canadiens coach Toe Blake announced his retirement. He gave the reason that it had been a hard season, but the real reason was that his wife was dying of cancer and he wanted to spend his time with her. The celebration became a mournful event with players paying tribute to Blake, many in tears. He won eight Cups as the Canadiens' coach and three others as a player with the Canadiens and Montreal Maroons, the former being a record that stood for thirty-four years. None other than Bowman, the runner-up team's head coach in this Finals, would be the one to break Blake's record: he won the Cup with the Canadiens in 1973, 1976, 1977, 1978, and 1979, with the Pittsburgh Penguins in 1992, and with the Detroit Red Wings in 1997, 1998, and 2002.

The Blues would return to the Cup Finals the next year, but were once again swept by the Canadiens. They would also reach the Finals in 1970, but were swept by the Boston Bruins. The Blues would have to wait until 2019 to finally win the Cup.

== Stanley Cup engraving ==
The 1968 Stanley Cup was presented to Canadiens captain Jean Beliveau by NHL President Clarence Campbell following the Canadiens 3–2 win over the Blues in Game 4.

The following Canadiens players and staff had their names engraved on the Stanley Cup

1967–68 Montreal Canadiens

=== Players ===
Centres

- 4 Jean Beliveau (C)
- 6 Ralph Backstrom
- 16 Henri Richard (A)
- 25 Jacques Lemaire

Wingers

- 8 Dick Duff
- 12 Yvan Cournoyer
- 11 Claude Larose
- 14 Claude Provost (A)
- 15 Bobby Rousseau
- 21 Gilles Tremblay
- 22 John Ferguson
- 23 Danny Grant
- 24 Mickey Redmond

Defencemen

- 2 Jacques Laperriere
- 3 Jean-Claude J. C. Tremblay
- 10 Edward Ted Harris
- 17 Carol Vadnais
- 18 Serge Savard
- 19 Terry Harper

Goaltenders

- 1 Lorne Gump Worsley
- 29 Ernie Wakely*
- 30 Rogatien Vachon
- * Did not play or dress in the Final.^{[A]}

=== Coaching and administrative staff ===
- Hartland Molson (chairman/owner)
- J. David Molson (president), Sam Pollock (vice president/general manager)
- Toe Blake (head coach), Larry Albut (trainer), Eddy Palchak (asst. trainer)

=== Stanley Cup engraving ===
- ^{^A} Ernie Wakely was engraved on the Stanley Cup for dressing for game 5 (of 5) of the Stanley Cup Semi-finals due to Gump Worsley missing the game injured. Wakely's name is on the Stanley Cup twice with Montreal in 1965, 1968, but he did not play any games for Montreal in either season. His first NHL game was in 1963, and his second in 1969. He would lead the NHL with the best goals-against average while playing with St. Louis in 1971.
- Danny Grant won the Stanley Cup in 1968 with Montreal and in 1969 won the Calder Trophy (Rookie of the Year) with Minnesota. Grant was the 3rd player to accomplish that feat.
- Toe Blake is the only coach to win the Stanley Cup in his first (1956) and last NHL season (1968) as such.

== Notes ==
Preceded by Toronto Maple Leafs; 1967	Montreal Canadiens; Stanley Cup champions 1968	Succeeded by Montreal Canadiens; 1969
