= 1969 Stanley Cup Final =

1969 ice hockey championship series

	1	2	3	4	Total
St. Louis Blues	1	1	0	1	0
Montreal Canadiens	3	3	4	2	4
- Location(s): Montreal: Montreal Forum (1, 2); St. Louis: St. Louis Arena (3, 4)
- Coaches: St. Louis: Scotty Bowman; Montreal: Claude Ruel
- Captains: St. Louis: Al Arbour; Montreal: Jean Beliveau
- Dates: April 27 – May 4, 1969
- MVP: Serge Savard (Canadiens)
- Series-winning goal: John Ferguson (3:02, third)
- Hall of Famers: Canadiens: Jean Beliveau (1972); Yvan Cournoyer (1982); Dick Duff (2006); Tony Esposito (1988); Jacques Laperriere (1987); Jacques Lemaire (1984); Henri Richard (1979); Serge Savard (1986); Rogie Vachon (2016); Gump Worsley (1980; did not play); Blues: Al Arbour (1996, builder); Glenn Hall (1975); Doug Harvey (1973; did not play); Jacques Plante (1978); Coaches: Scotty Bowman (1991)

The 1969 Stanley Cup Final was the championship series of the National Hockey League's (NHL) 1968–69 season, and the culmination of the 1969 Stanley Cup playoffs. It was contested between the defending champion Montreal Canadiens and the St. Louis Blues, a rematch of the previous year's finals. As they did in the previous matchup, the Canadiens won the series in four games.

== Paths to the Finals ==
Montreal defeated the New York Rangers 4–0 and the Boston Bruins 4–2 to advance to the finals.

St. Louis defeated the Philadelphia Flyers and Los Angeles Kings in four games each.

== Game summaries ==
This was the second playoff series between these two teams. Their only previous meeting came in the previous year's Stanley Cup Final. In this year's six-game regular season series, there were five wins for Montreal and one tie. Claude Ruel became the eleventh rookie coach to win the Stanley Cup. Montreal would be without star defenceman Doug Harvey for the entire playoffs, as he had suffered a skull fracture in an automobile accident at the end of the regular season. Goaltender Rogie Vachon limited St. Louis to three goals in four games.

=== Game one ===
April 27	St. Louis Blues	1–3	Montreal Canadiens	Montreal Forum	Recap

In game one, Montreal defeated St. Louis in a 3–1 victory on home ice, with Dick Duff, Bobby Rousseau, and John Ferguson all scoring for the Canadiens, giving them a 1–0 series lead over the Blues.

Scoring summary
Period	Team	Goal	Assist(s)	Time	Score
1st	MTL	Dick Duff (3) – pp	Yvan Cournoyer (5) and Jean Beliveau (4)	03:39	1–0 MTL
1st	MTL	Bobby Rousseau (3) – sh	Claude Provost (2)	04:17	2–0 MTL
1st	STL	Frank St. Marseille (3)	Bill McCreary (5) and Noel Picard (4)	18:24	2–1 MTL
2nd	None				
3rd	MTL	John Ferguson (3) – en	Henri Richard (4)	19:46	3–1 MTL
Penalty summary
Period	Team	Player	Penalty	Time	PIM
1st	MTL	Jacques Laperriere	Roughing	01:18	2:00
1st	STL	Red Berenson	Slashing	02:58	2:00
1st	MTL	Jacques Laperriere	Interference	04:06	2:00
1st	MTL	Jacques Laperriere	Misconduct	04:06	10:00
1st	STL	Gary Sabourin	Slashing	04:44	2:00
1st	STL	Bill McCreary	Slashing	06:31	2:00
1st	MTL	Henri Richard	Interference	10:44	2:00
1st	MTL	J. C. Tremblay	Slashing	16:51	2:00
1st	STL	Tim Ecclestone	Holding	16:51	2:00
2nd	MTL	Jean Beliveau	Tripping	00:44	2:00
2nd	MTL	Ted Harris	High-sticking	03:21	2:00
2nd	STL	Jim Roberts	High-sticking	03:21	2:00
2nd	STL	Bench (served by Tim Ecclestone)	Too many men on the ice	07:00	2:00
2nd	MTL	Jacques Laperriere	Holding	07:48	2:00
2nd	STL	Bob Plager	Charging	12:21	2:00
3rd	MTL	Terry Harper	Interference	07:53	2:00

Shots by period
Team	1	2	3	Total
St. Louis	5	10	5	20
Montreal	14	5	9	28

=== Game two ===
April 29	St. Louis Blues	1–3	Montreal Canadiens	Montreal Forum	Recap

Game two ended with the same result as game one, with Montreal defeating St. Louis by a score of 3–1 on their home ice, taking a 2–0 as the series continued into St. Louis.

Scoring summary
Period	Team	Goal	Assist(s)	Time	Score
1st	MTL	Ralph Backstrom (3)	J. C. Tremblay (3)	17:26	1–0 MTL
2nd	MTL	Dick Duff (4) – pp	Jean Beliveau (7) and Serge Savard (6)	09:07	2–0 MTL
2nd	MTL	Yvan Cournoyer (4)	Jean Beliveau (8)	14:11	3–0 MTL
3rd	STL	Larry Keenan (4)	Jim Roberts (4) and Bob Plager (4)	09:20	3–1 MTL
Penalty summary
Period	Team	Player	Penalty	Time	PIM
1st	MTL	Dick Duff	Elbowing	02:17	2:00
1st	STL	Noel Picard	Elbowing	02:17	2:00
1st	STL	Tim Ecclestone	Tripping	03:30	2:00
1st	MTL	Jean Beliveau	High-sticking	04:54	2:00
1st	STL	Al Arbour	High-sticking	04:54	2:00
1st	MTL	Ted Harris	Tripping	06:36	2:00
1st	STL	Noel Picard	Tripping	07:34	2:00
1st	MTL	Terry Harper	Holding	14:17	2:00
1st	MTL	John Ferguson	Cross-checking	19:50	2:00
1st	MTL	John Ferguson	Spearing	19:50	2:00
1st	MTL	John Ferguson	Misconduct	19:50	10:00
2nd	STL	Bill McCreary	Tripping	08:45	2:00
3rd	STL	Bill Plager	Holding	02:34	2:00
3rd	MTL	Ted Harris	Elbowing	05:21	2:00
3rd	STL	Terry Crisp	High-sticking	05:21	2:00
3rd	MTL	Bobby Rousseau	Tripping	08:40	2:00
3rd	MTL	Serge Savard	Holding	09:09	2:00
3rd	STL	Noel Picard	Playing with a broken stick	17:58	2:00
3rd	MTL	Jacques Laperriere	Cross-checking	19:23	2:00

Shots by period
Team	1	2	3	Total
St. Louis	5	10	10	25
Montreal	9	15	9	33

=== Game three ===
May 1	Montreal Canadiens	4–0	St. Louis Blues	St. Louis Arena	Recap

Rogie Vachon made 29 saves in game four to record his first career playoff shutout in game four, while Dick Duff recorded three points for Montreal, giving them a 4–0 victory over St. Louis to take a commanding 3–0 series lead.

Scoring summary
Period	Team	Goal	Assist(s)	Time	Score
1st	MTL	Serge Savard (4)	Dick Duff (7)	12:34	1–0 MTL
2nd	MTL	Jacques Lemaire (4)	Mickey Redmond (3)	08:16	2–0 MTL
2nd	MTL	Dick Duff (5)	Yvan Cournoyer (6) and Jean Beliveau (9)	13:38	3–0 MTL
3rd	MTL	Dick Duff (6) – pp	Jean Beliveau (10) and Yvan Cournoyer (7)	18:35	4–0 MTL
Penalty summary
Period	Team	Player	Penalty	Time	PIM
1st	STL	Noel Picard	Holding	05:13	2:00
1st	STL	Tim Ecclestone	Hooking	07:40	2:00
1st	MTL	John Ferguson	Charging	15:19	2:00
2nd	STL	Ron Schock	Tripping	04:55	2:00
2nd	MTL	Jacques Laperriere	Holding	10:46	2:00
2nd	MTL	Ralph Backstrom	Hooking	15:41	2:00
2nd	MTL	J. C. Tremblay	Tripping	17:27	2:00
3rd	MTL	Ralph Backstrom	Hooking	08:31	2:00
3rd	STL	Tim Ecclestone	Hooking	17:34	2:00

Shots by period
Team	1	2	3	Total
Montreal	14	13	8	35
St. Louis	10	10	9	29

=== Game four ===
May 4	Montreal Canadiens	2–1	St. Louis Blues	St. Louis Arena	Recap

Vachon would perform well in goal again for Montreal in game four, making 32 saves. John Ferguson scored the game winning goal early in the third period to help the Canadiens win the game by a score of 2–1, completing the four-game sweep of St. Louis and winning the Stanley Cup. Serge Savard was awarded the Conn Smythe Trophy, becoming the first defenseman in NHL history to win the award.

Scoring summary
Period	Team	Goal	Assist(s)	Time	Score
1st	None				
2nd	STL	Terry Gray (3)	Frank St. Marseille (3) and Terry Crisp (4)	10:50	1–0 STL
3rd	MTL	Ted Harris (1)	Dick Duff (3) and J. C. Tremblay (4)	00:42	1–1
3rd	MTL	John Ferguson (4)	Ralph Backstrom (4)	03:02	2–1 MTL
Penalty summary
Period	Team	Player	Penalty	Time	PIM
1st	MTL	Serge Savard	Cross-checking	00:25	2:00
1st	STL	Jean-Guy Talbot	Elbowing	04:40	2:00
1st	MTL	John Ferguson	Charging	06:42	2:00
1st	MTL	John Ferguson	Charging	09:07	2:00
1st	MTL	Jacques Lemaire	Spearing	14:03	2:00
1st	STL	Gary Sabourin	Spearing	14:03	2:00
1st	STL	Bench (served by Frank St. Marseille)	Too many men on the ice	16:17	2:00
1st	MTL	Serge Savard	Elbowing	19:34	2:00
1st	STL	Ab McDonald	High-sticking	19:34	2:00
2nd	STL	Jim Roberts	Holding	03:36	2:00
2nd	MTL	J. C. Tremblay	Tripping	14:32	2:00
2nd	STL	Red Berenson	Elbowing	14:32	2:00
2nd	MTL	Jacques Lemaire	Roughing	14:45	2:00
2nd	STL	Bill Plager	Roughing	14:45	2:00
2nd	MTL	Serge Savard	High-sticking	16:06	2:00
2nd	STL	Tim Ecclestone	High-sticking	16:06	2:00
2nd	MTL	Jacques Laperriere	High-sticking	19:59	2:00
2nd	STL	Ab McDonald	High-sticking	19:59	2:00
3rd	STL	Al Arbour	Hooking	05:25	2:00

Shots by period
Team	1	2	3	Total
Montreal	8	14	9	31
St. Louis	13	12	8	33

== Stanley Cup engraving ==
The 1969 Stanley Cup was presented to Canadiens captain Jean Beliveau by NHL President Clarence Campbell following the Canadiens 2–1 win over the Blues in game four.

The following Canadiens players and staff had their names engraved on the Stanley Cup

1968–69 Montreal Canadiens

=== Players ===
Centres

- 4 Jean Beliveau (Captain)
- 6 Ralph Backstrom
- 16 Henri Richard (A)
- 23 Christian Bordeleau
- 25 Jacques Lemaire

Wingers

- 5 Gilles Tremblay^{[B]}
- 8 Dick Duff
- 12 Yvan Cournoyer
- 14 Claude Provost (A)
- 15 Bobby Rousseau
- 22 John Ferguson Sr.
- 24 Mickey Redmond

Defencemen

- 2 Jacques Laperriere
- 3 Jean-Claude J. C. Tremblay
- 10 Edward Ted Harris
- 17 Larry Hillman
- 18 Serge Savard
- 19 Terry Harper

Goaltenders

- 1 Lorne Gump Worsley
- 29 Anthony Tony Esposito^{[A]}
- 30 Rogatien Vachon

=== Coaching and administrative staff ===
- J. David Molson (President/Owner), William Molson (Vice President/Owner)
- Peter Molson (Vice President/Owner), Sam Pollock (Vice President/General Manager)
- Claude Ruel (Head Coach)
- Larry Albut (Trainer), Eddy Palchak (Asst. Trainer)
- Floyd Curry (Asst. General Manager)

=== Stanley Cup engraving ===
- ^{^A} Anthony "Tony" Esposito's name was misspelled on the Replica Stanley Cup created in 1992–93 as P. FSPOSITO instead of A. ESPOSITO. Tony Esposito only played 13 regular season games, but qualified to be engraved on the Stanley Cup. Tony dressed for every game in the finals due to Gump Worsley being injured. Tony then won the Calder Trophy (Rookie of the Year) with Chicago in 1970. He was fourth player to accomplish the feat of winning the Stanley Cup before winning the Calder Trophy.
- ^{^B} #5 Gilles Tremblay (LW) missed the playoffs with a career-ending injury. His name was still included in the Stanley Cup.
- Claude Ruel was the 10th NHL rookie coach to win the Stanley Cup.
- #20–21 Lucien Grenier (RW) played 2 semi-final games, but his name was left off the Stanley Cup even though he qualified to be engraved on it. He was left off for playing the whole regular season in the minors.

=== Won 4 Stanley Cups in 5 Years with Montreal 1965, 1966, 1968, 1969 ===
- Ralph Backstrom, Jean Beliveau, Yvan Cournoyer, Dick Duff, John Ferguson, Terry Harper, Ted Harris, Jacques Laperriere, Claude Provost, Henri Richard, Bobby Rousseau, Gilles Tremblay, Jean-Claude Tremblay, Gump Worsley (14 players), David Molson, Sam Pollock, Larry Aubut (3 non-players).

== See also ==
- 1968–69 NHL season

== Notes ==
Preceded by Montreal Canadiens; 1968	Montreal Canadiens; Stanley Cup champions 1969	Succeeded by Boston Bruins; 1970
