= Terry Harper =

Canadian ice hockey player (born 1940)

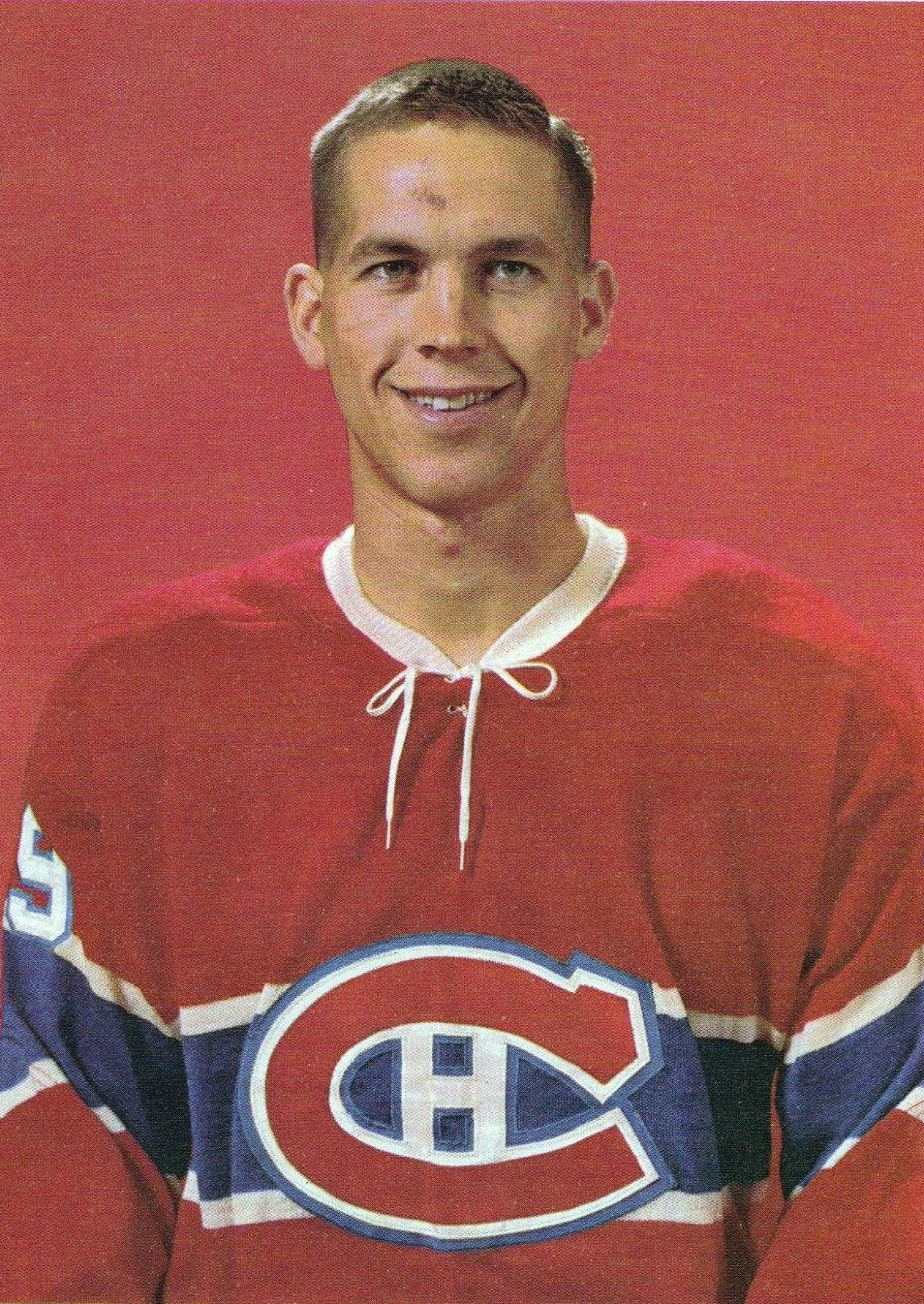
- Born: January 27, 1940 (age 86) Regina, Saskatchewan, Canada
- Height: 6 ft 1 in (185 cm)
- Weight: 197 lb (89 kg; 14 st 1 lb)
- Position: Defence
- Shot: Right
- Played for: Montreal Canadiens; Los Angeles Kings; Detroit Red Wings; St. Louis Blues; Colorado Rockies
- Playing career: 1962–1981

Terrance Victor Harper (born January 27, 1940) is a Canadian former professional ice hockey player. Harper played in the National Hockey League from 1962 to 1981. During this time, he played for the Montreal Canadiens, Los Angeles Kings, Detroit Red Wings, St. Louis Blues, and Colorado Rockies.

== Early life ==
Harper grew up in Regina, Saskatchewan playing hockey. When he was young, he suffered serious third-degree burns to his arms, chest, stomach, and legs in a fire. The damage required seven years of skin grafting. Doctors allowed him to play hockey as a way to rebuild his leg muscles.

He played for Regina's local hockey team, which was sponsored by the Montreal Canadiens. In the 1958 Memorial Cup finals, they lost to the Ottawa-Hull Junior Canadiens, who were led by manager Sam Pollock, coach Scotty Bowman and future stars J.C Tremblay, Gilles Tremblay, Ralph Backstrom, and Bobby Rousseau.

== Playing career ==
Harper played his first 10 seasons with the Montreal Canadiens. He joined the team in 1962. However, he didn't debut for the team until 1963. While with Montreal, Harper had his greatest success, winning five Stanley Cups between 1963 and 1972.

On October 30, 1963, Harper got into an altercation with Bob Pulford of the Toronto Maple Leafs while sharing the penalty box. As a result, separate penalty boxes for teams were created 10 days later.

Before the 1972–73 season, Harper was traded to the Los Angeles Kings, where he anchored a defence that became one of the league's stingiest. Harper was immediately named team captain, a position he held for 3 seasons until his trade to Detroit after the 1974–75 season. In 1973, he was an All-Star. In that game, he made a game-tying goal for the West All-Stars. However, Bobby Schmautz then scored the game-winning goal for the East All-Stars. The Kings made the playoffs twice in his tenure there, but each time got bounced in the first round.

After the 1974–75 season, on June 23, 1975, Harper, along with Dan Maloney, was traded to the Detroit Red Wings as part of the blockbuster trade that sent Hall of Famer Marcel Dionne and Bart Crashley to Los Angeles. Once again, he was named team captain for Detroit. In the 1975–76 season, he erupted for a career-high eight goals with the Detroit Red Wings. After 4 solid seasons for a struggling Red Wings team, he played his final two seasons for the St. Louis Blues and Colorado Rockies, where he played into his 40s. He retired in 1981, at the age of 41.

In 19 seasons in the league, Harper finished with only 254 points. For his career, he finished with 35 goals, 221 assists, 1,362 penalty minutes, and a plus/minus total of +169 (this statistic did not become official until the 1967–68 season, Harper's 6th in the league).

== Coaching career ==
Harper became the assistant coach of the Colorado Rockies in 1980–81.

== Playing style ==
Harper was a defensive defenceman whose style of play was characterized by physicality. He regularly accumulated penalty minutes and was frequently used on his team's penalty-killing unit.

Harper rarely scored, and the "Harper hat trick" was when he scored 3 goals in a season (vs. 3 in one game). He accomplished this 5 times in his 18-year career, erupting for a career-high 8 goals in the 1975–76 season with the Detroit Red Wings.

== Personal life ==
Harper was married for 60 years before his wife died. He lives alone in Folsom, California, with his kids and grandkids close by. His daughter also lives in Folsom, and his two sons live in West Sacramento and Stockton. Despite his old age, Harper plays hockey twice a week.

== Awards and achievements ==
- Stanley Cup champion – 1965, 1966, 1968, 1969, 1971 (with Montreal)
- Los Angeles Kings Team Captain, 1973 - 1975
- Detroit Red Wings Team Captain, 1976
- 4 All-Star Games: 1965, 1967, 1973, 1975
- Saskatchewan Hockey Hall of Fame, 2016

== Career statistics ==
=== Regular season and playoffs ===
			Regular season					Playoffs
Season	Team	League	GP	G	A	Pts	PIM	GP	G	A	Pts	PIM
1957–58	Regina Pats	SJHL	51	6	10	16	74	12	2	3	5	12
1957–58	Regina Pats	M-Cup	—	—	—	—	—	16	3	2	5	8
1958–59	Regina Pats	SJHL	48	1	19	20	79	9	1	2	3	6
1959–60	Regina Pats	SJHL	59	17	21	38	56	13	3	7	10	6
1960–61	Montreal Royals	EPHL	69	3	14	17	85	—	—	—	—	—
1961–62	Hull-Ottawa Canadiens	EPHL	65	2	18	20	101	12	0	1	1	15
1962–63	Montreal Canadiens	NHL	14	1	1	2	10	5	1	0	1	8
1962–63	Hull-Ottawa Canadiens	EPHL	52	6	31	37	83	—	—	—	—	—
1962–63	Quebec Aces	AHL	3	0	0	0	0	—	—	—	—	—
1963–64	Montreal Canadiens	NHL	70	2	15	17	149	7	0	0	0	6
1964–65	Montreal Canadiens	NHL	62	0	7	7	93	13	0	0	0	19
1965–66	Montreal Canadiens	NHL	69	1	11	12	91	10	2	3	5	18
1966–67	Montreal Canadiens	NHL	56	0	16	16	99	10	0	1	1	15
1967–68	Montreal Canadiens	NHL	57	3	8	11	66	13	0	1	1	8
1968–69	Montreal Canadiens	NHL	21	0	3	3	37	11	0	0	0	8
1968–69	Cleveland Barons	AHL	28	2	4	6	21	—	—	—	—	—
1969–70	Montreal Canadiens	NHL	75	4	18	22	109	—	—	—	—	—
1970–71	Montreal Canadiens	NHL	78	1	21	22	116	20	0	6	6	28
1971–72	Montreal Canadiens	NHL	52	2	12	14	35	5	1	1	2	6
1972–73	Los Angeles Kings	NHL	77	1	8	9	74	—	—	—	—	—
1973–74	Los Angeles Kings	NHL	77	0	17	17	119	5	0	0	0	16
1974–75	Los Angeles Kings	NHL	80	5	21	26	120	3	0	0	0	2
1975–76	Detroit Red Wings	NHL	69	8	25	33	59	—	—	—	—	—
1976–77	Detroit Red Wings	NHL	52	4	8	12	28	—	—	—	—	—
1977–78	Detroit Red Wings	NHL	80	2	17	19	85	7	0	1	1	4
1978–79	Detroit Red Wings	NHL	51	0	6	6	58	—	—	—	—	—
1978–79	Kansas City Red Wings	CHL	22	0	13	13	36	—	—	—	—	—
1979–80	St. Louis Blues	NHL	11	1	5	6	6	3	0	0	0	2
1980–81	Colorado Rockies	NHL	15	0	2	2	8	—	—	—	—	—
NHL totals			1,066	35	221	256	1,362	112	4	13	17	140

== See also ==
- List of NHL players with 1,000 games played

Preceded by Bob Pulford	Los Angeles Kings captain 1973–75	Succeeded by Mike Murphy
Preceded by Danny Grant	Detroit Red Wings captain 1975–76	Succeeded by Danny Grant
