= 12th National Hockey League All-Star Game =

Professional ice hockey exhibition game

12th NHL All-Star Game
	1	2	3	Total
All-Star Team	0	1	2	3
Montreal Canadiens	2	2	2	6
- Date: October 4, 1958
- Arena: Montreal Forum
- City: Montreal
- Attendance: 13,989

The 12th National Hockey League All-Star Game took place at the Montreal Forum on October 4, 1958. The hometown Montreal Canadiens defeated the NHL All-Stars 6–3.

== Richard Brothers Lead Canadiens to Victory ==
Maurice "Rocket" Richard scored the first and last goals of the game, and brother Henri Richard scored the winning goal and added two assists to lead the Stanley Cup champion Montreal Canadiens to a 6–3 victory over the all-stars. Andy Bathgate of the New York Rangers scored twice for the All-Stars.

During the game, the Canadiens' Bernie "Boom Boom" Geoffrion had to be helped off the ice, after receiving a crushing body-check from Red Kelly of the Detroit Red Wings. Geoffrion suffered pulled chest and neck muscles, but was back in the line-up for the Canadiens' home opener a few days later.

== Boxscore ==
	Montreal Canadiens	All-Stars
Final score	6	3
Head coach	Toe Blake	Milt Schmidt (Boston Bruins)
Lineup	1 - G Jacques Plante; 2 - D Doug Harvey (Captain); 4 - C Jean Beliveau; 5 - RW Bernie Geoffrion; 6 - C Ralph Backstrom; 9 - RW Maurice "Rocket" Richard; 10 - D Tom Johnson; 12 - LW Dickie Moore; 14 - RW Claude Provost; 15 - LW Ab McDonald; 16 - C Henri Richard; 17 - D Jean-Guy Talbot; 18 - LW Marcel Bonin; 19 - D Al Langlois; 20 - C Phil Goyette; 21 - D Ian Cushenan; 22 - LW Don Marshall; 23 - LW Andre Pronovost	First team All-Stars: 1 - G Glenn Hall (Chicago Black Hawks); 4 - D Bill Gadsby (New York Rangers); 9 - RW Gordie Howe (Detroit Red Wings); Second team All-Stars: 3 - D Marcel Pronovost (Detroit Red Wings); 8 - RW Andy Bathgate (New York Rangers); 14 - D Fern Flaman (Boston Bruins); 12 - LW Camille Henry (New York Rangers); Other players: 5 - D Red Kelly (Toronto Maple Leafs); 7 - C Red Sullivan (New York Rangers); 10 - LW Alex Delvecchio (Detroit Red Wings); 11 - RW Jerry Toppazzini (Boston Bruins); 15 - C Billy Harris (Toronto Maple Leafs); 16 - LW Dick Duff (Toronto Maple Leafs); 17 - RW Ed Litzenberger (Chicago Black Hawks); 18 - C Don McKenney (Boston Bruins); 19 - D Doug Mohns (Boston Bruins); 20 - C Bob Pulford (Toronto Maple Leafs); 24 - D Dollard St. Laurent (Chicago Black Hawks)
Scoring summary	M. Richard (Harvey, Moore) 9:19 first (power-play); Geoffrion (H. Richard) 16:20 first; Marshall (Provost) 2:33 second (short-handed); H. Richard (Talbot, Moore) 5:08 second; McDonald (Provost, Marshall) 7:43 third (power-play); M. Richard (Moore, H. Richard) 16:04 third	Pulford (Toppazzini, Harris) 11:39 second; Bathgate (Litzenberger, Henry) 3:55 third; Bathgate (Pulford, Sullivan) 13:54 third (power-play)
Penalties	Harvey 11:41 first; Turner 2:24 second; Provost 12:52 third	Henry 7:29 first; Mohns 4:25 third; Duff 7:36 third
Win/loss	Jacques Plante	Glenn Hall

Shots on goal
Montreal	17	11	11	39
All-Stars	7	8	12	27

- Referee: Eddie Powers
- Linesmen: George Hayes and William Morrison
- Attendance: 13,989
