= Dick Duff =

Canadian ice hockey player (born 1936)

- Hockey Hall of Fame, 2006
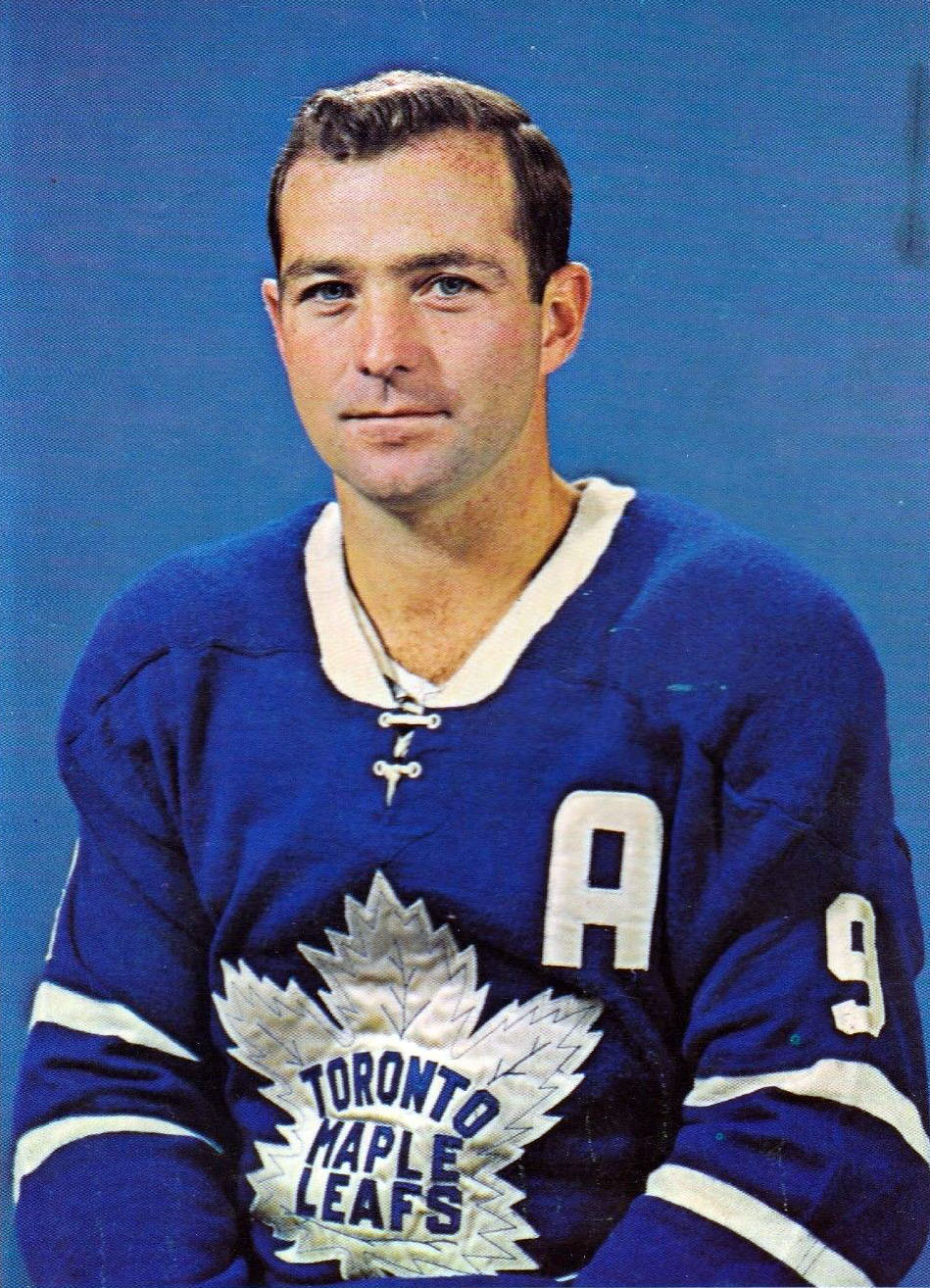
- Duff with the Toronto Maple Leafs, c. 1963
- Born: February 18, 1936 (age 90) Kirkland Lake, Ontario, Canada
- Height: 5 ft 10 in (178 cm)
- Weight: 163 lb (74 kg; 11 st 9 lb)
- Position: Left wing
- Shot: Left
- Played for: Toronto Maple Leafs; New York Rangers; Montreal Canadiens; Los Angeles Kings; Buffalo Sabres
- Playing career: 1954–1972

Terrance Richard Duff (born February 18, 1936) is a Canadian former professional ice hockey forward who played 18 seasons in the National Hockey League (NHL) from 1955 to 1971. He played for the Toronto Maple Leafs, Montreal Canadiens, Buffalo Sabres, Los Angeles Kings, and New York Rangers. Duff also briefly served as head coach for the Leafs during the 1979–80 season. Standing 5 feet 10 inches tall and weighing 163 pounds, he was renowned as one of the top small players of his era.

== Early life ==
Duff was born to John and Ethel Duff at the house of Ethel's sister in 1936 in Kirkland Lake, Ontario, a small mining town. Ted Lindsay, who Duff described as his idol, grew up in the town (coincidentally, four Kirkland Lake residents all played each other in the 1967 Stanley Cup Final with Duff, Ralph Backstrom, Mike Walton and Larry Hillman). Duff was the sixth of 13 siblings born to John and Ethel Duff, a mining family (with his father having worked with Lake Shore Mines) and related his upbringing in a 2026 interview:

“My mother (Ethel) was a dedicated person, a strong Catholic. People were coming and going from our place all the time. Three of my sisters went to nursing school and on to St. Joseph’s Hospital in Toronto.

He began playing hockey at a young age with his brothers, doing so on outdoor rinks even at night. In 1953, at the age of 16, he moved to Toronto to attend St. Michael's College School and play for the school's team, the Toronto St. Michael's Majors while having a spot with the Junior B Buzzers of the Toronto Maple Leafs. His father gave him $2 in his pocket for expenses and sent him on his way. He recorded over a game in each of his last two seasons that attracted the attention of the Maple Leafs, who signed him before his final school year was over to help fill in for an injured Eric Nesterenko. In the summer months during his playing career, he pursued university education. He was later inducted into St. Michael's The Order of St. Michael for his efforts within the community.

== Playing career ==
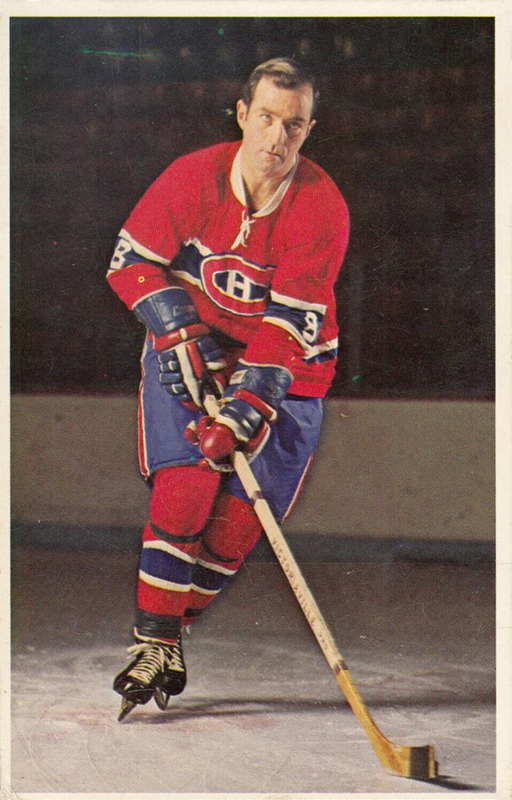
Duff with the Montreal Canadiens c. 1969

Duff played his first game in the NHL on March 10, 1955 in a scoreless game between the Montreal Canadiens and the Toronto Maple Leafs. He played in two further games to close out the season, taking two penalty minutes for his first statistic in the season finale; he was paid $100 for each game played that year. He signed his first pro contract for $7,000.

In the 1955–56 season, Duff recorded his first goal on October 26 against the Montreal Canadiens, recording both goals in a 2–1 victory. Playing in 69 of 70 games that season, Duff had 18 goals and 19 assists for 37 points while taking 74 penalty minutes. In the NHL Semifinals, he recorded four combined assists in the first three games and scored the only goal for Toronto in the Game 5 loss. He was later named to the NHL All-Star Game. While the Maple Leafs did not reach the playoffs in the next two seasons, Duff continued to hone in his skills for goals, which saw him score 26 goals in both of the 1956–57 and 1957–58 seasons and earn a selection to the NHL All-Star Game. In his fourth full season of play in the 1958–59 season, the Maple Leafs reached the Stanley Cup Final and Duff had 29 goals with 24 assists for 53 total points that was his first and only 50-point season. In the semifinals against Boston, he had two goals and two assists, which included the go-ahead goal in Game 4 and an assist in Game 7. In the Stanley Cup Final against Montreal, he had a goal in Game 1 and the game-winner in overtime of Game 3 to go with one assist as Toronto lost in five games in the first of consecutive Final losses.

The 1961–62 season saw him miss a quarter of the season with a broken ankle. In the 1962 Stanley Cup playoffs, he was ready to play in all twelve postseason games and recorded three goals with ten assists, with his final goal being the go-ahead winner in Game 6 of the Final against Chicago (on an assist by Tim Horton) as the Maple Leafs won their first championship in ten years. The 1963 Final saw him score two goals in a span of eleven seconds to start off Game 1; he had four goals and an assist in the playoffs as the Maple Leafs won their second straight Cup.

By the 1963–64 season, Duff had disagreements with head coach Punch Imlach, describing him as "such a demanding coach". On February 22, 1964, he was traded to the New York Rangers in a major seven-player trade, which saw Andy Bathgate and Don McKenney go to Toronto while Duff, Bob Nevin and three younger players went to New York as the Rangers looked for checking forwards such as Duff. He finished the year with 11 goals and 14 assists in 66 games.

On December 22, 1964, the Rangers traded Duff to Montreal for Ernie Hicke. Duff would play for the Canadiens until 1970, serving a part of four championship teams. Duff's 1966–67 card was featured in the 1999 film Winter Stories. Early in the 1969–70 season, Duff indicated he wanted to retire, citing personal problems but was talked out of it. He played 17 games for the team that season for Montreal. In January 1970, he was traded to the Los Angeles Kings (which he later expressed regret, stating he should've retired with Montreal) and later traded to the Buffalo Sabres in December 1970. After finishing the 1970–71 season, he returned for a final 11 games the following year before retiring. Duff recorded fourteen seasons of at least ten goals, which ranked him as one of 24 players with at least fourteen 10-goal seasons in NHL history at the time he retired. Duff won the Stanley Cup six times—twice with Toronto and four times with Montreal; only nine other players have won more Cups as a player. Described as a "money" player who saved his best for the playoffs, Duff was tied for 15th in Stanley Cup playoff goals with 30 and also 15th in total points with 79 when he retired. Imlach once described Duff as "probably the best playoff player I ever coached."

== Post-playing career ==
After retirement, Duff was the Liberal candidate for Timiskaming at the 1972 Canadian federal election, coming in second to incumbent Arnold Peters. He was became general manager and head coach of the Windsor Spitfires doing so for the 1974-75 season. He became an assistant coach for the Toronto Maple Leafs for three seasons from 1979 until 1981; Duff served as an interim head coach for two games in the 1979–80 season. He subsequently served as a scout until the mid-1990s.

In 2006, he was announced for induction into the Hockey Hall of Fame. Upon being asked about his feelings about the honor, he stated the following:

"I was almost in tears [when I heard about the induction]. This means a lot to me, just like playing hockey meant a lot to me."

He was inducted into the Hockey Hall of Fame on November 13, 2006, and into the Ontario Sports Hall of Fame in 2014.

== Personal life ==
As late as 2024, Duff resided in Port Credit in Mississauga, Ontario. As of 2026, Duff resides in a seniors’ residence in Scarborough.

His brother Les Duff also played professional ice hockey, and his great-nephew Cody Goloubef has played in the NHL.

== Career statistics ==
=== Regular season and playoffs ===
			Regular season					Playoffs
Season	Team	League	GP	G	A	Pts	PIM	GP	G	A	Pts	PIM
1952–53	Toronto St. Michael's Majors	OHA	16	3	2	5	2	16	6	9	15	15
1953–54	Toronto St. Michael's Majors	OHA	59	35	40	75	120	8	2	3	5	23
1954–55	Toronto St. Michael's Majors	OHA	47	33	20	53	113	5	5	2	7	22
1954–55	Toronto Maple Leafs	NHL	3	0	0	0	2	—	—	—	—	—
1955–56	Toronto Maple Leafs	NHL	69	18	19	37	74	5	1	4	5	2
1956–57	Toronto Maple Leafs	NHL	70	26	14	40	50	—	—	—	—	—
1957–58	Toronto Maple Leafs	NHL	65	26	23	49	79	—	—	—	—	—
1958–59	Toronto Maple Leafs	NHL	69	29	24	53	73	12	4	3	7	8
1959–60	Toronto Maple Leafs	NHL	67	19	22	41	51	10	2	4	6	6
1960–61	Toronto Maple Leafs	NHL	67	16	17	33	54	5	0	1	1	2
1961–62	Toronto Maple Leafs	NHL	51	17	20	37	37	12	3	10	13	20
1962–63	Toronto Maple Leafs	NHL	69	16	19	35	56	10	4	1	5	2
1963–64	Toronto Maple Leafs	NHL	52	7	10	17	59	—	—	—	—	—
1963–64	New York Rangers	NHL	14	4	4	8	2	—	—	—	—	—
1964–65	New York Rangers	NHL	29	3	9	12	20	—	—	—	—	—
1964–65	Montreal Canadiens	NHL	40	9	7	16	16	13	3	6	9	17
1965–66	Montreal Canadiens	NHL	63	21	24	45	78	10	2	5	7	2
1966–67	Montreal Canadiens	NHL	51	12	11	23	23	10	2	3	5	4
1967–68	Montreal Canadiens	NHL	66	25	21	46	21	13	3	4	7	4
1968–69	Montreal Canadiens	NHL	68	19	21	40	24	14	6	8	14	11
1969–70	Montreal Canadiens	NHL	17	1	1	2	4	—	—	—	—	—
1969–70	Los Angeles Kings	NHL	32	5	8	13	8	—	—	—	—	—
1970–71	Los Angeles Kings	NHL	7	1	0	1	0	—	—	—	—	—
1970–71	Buffalo Sabres	NHL	53	7	13	20	12	—	—	—	—	—
1971–72	Buffalo Sabres	NHL	8	2	2	4	0	—	—	—	—	—
NHL totals			1,030	283	289	572	743	114	30	49	79	78

=== Coaching record ===
Team	Year	Regular season						
Team	Year	G	W	L	T	Pts	Finish	Result
Toronto Maple Leafs	1979–80	2	0	2	0	0	4th in Adams	Interim coach

== Achievements ==
Award	Year(s)
NHL
All-Star Game	1956, 1957, 1958, 1962 (Note: At the time, the All-Star Game pitted the Stanley Cup champion against a select group of All-Stars just before the start of a season, and Duff played in the game as part of the defending Stanley Cup champion team) 1963, 1965, 1967 (Note: In the penultimate All-Star Game pitting the defending Stanley Cup champion, the ASG was played in January for the first time ever)
Stanley Cup champion	1962, 1963, 1965, 1966, 1968, 1969

== See also ==
- List of NHL players with 1,000 games played

== Notes ==
Preceded by Floyd Smith	Head coach of the Toronto Maple Leafs; 1979–80	Succeeded by Punch Imlach
