= 1966–67 NHL transactions =

The following is a list of all team-to-team transactions that have occurred in the National Hockey League (NHL) during the 1966–67 NHL season. It lists which team each player has been traded to and for which player(s) or other consideration(s), if applicable.

== Transactions ==
June 13, 1966	To Montreal Canadiens Garry Peters; Ted Taylor	To New York Rangers Red Berenson
December 20, 1966	To Detroit Red Wings Howie Young	To Chicago Black Hawks loan of Al LeBrun and Murray Hall for remainder of 1966–67 season future considerations^{1} (Al LeBrun) (Murray Hall) (Rick Morris)

Notes

1. Trade completed in June, 1966 (exact date unknown).
