= Irving Grundman =

Canadian ice hockey executive (1928–2021)

- Born: July 23, 1928; Montreal, Quebec, Canada
- Died: February 26, 2021 (aged 92); Montreal, Quebec, Canada
- Occupations: politician, businessman, NHL general manager

Irving Grundman (July 23, 1928 – February 26, 2021) was a Canadian ice hockey executive and municipal politician. He served as general manager of the Montreal Canadiens from 1978 to 1983. He also served on the Montreal City Council. Prior to his career in hockey and politics, he was the co-founder of the Laurentian Lanes bowling alleys.

== Early life ==
Grundman was born in Montreal on July 23, 1928. His father, Morris, worked in the meat industry; his mother was Bessie (Epstein). Grundman first worked together with his father in the meat business. He went on to establish Laurentian Lanes – which owned bowling alleys in Montreal, Ottawa, and Kingston – in 1959, along with his friend Jack Prehogan. After almost a decade with Laurentian Lanes, Grundman was elected as a municipal councillor for Saint-Laurent in 1968, while staying on with the company.

== Career ==
=== Montreal Canadiens ===
Grundman became president of the Montreal Forum in 1972, one year after Peter and Edward Bronfman purchased both the venue and the Montreal Canadiens. He managed the Forum's business operations. He was subsequently appointed general manager (GM) after Sam Pollock retired in 1978, edging out both Scotty Bowman and Al MacNeil for the job despite having no prior experience in hockey.

Grundman served as GM of the Canadiens from 1978 until 1983. His name was engraved on the Stanley Cup in 1979, and he was one of the few GMs to win the Cup in their first year in the role. He was responsible for drafting future National Hockey League (NHL) stars such as Guy Carbonneau and Chris Chelios, both of whom were eventually inducted into the Hockey Hall of Fame. However, he also passed on Montreal Juniors star and future NHL superstar, Denis Savard, as well as defencemen Larry Murphy and Paul Coffey with the first selection of the 1980 NHL entry draft, picking Doug Wickenheiser instead in what reporter Frank Seravalli described as an infamous selection.

Grundman's biggest move as the Canadiens general manager occurred on September 7, 1982 when he traded Rod Langway, Brian Engblom, Doug Jarvis and Craig Laughlin to the Washington Capitals in exchange for Ryan Walter and Rick Green. While Grundman's acquisitions of Walter and Green proved to be solid for the Canadiens, the trade however wound up saving the Capitals franchise in the long term.

In April 1983, Grundman was one of three Canadiens personnel to be dismissed, along with head coach Bob Berry and director of personnel and recruiting Ron Caron. This came several days after the team was eliminated from the opening round of the Stanley Cup playoffs for the third straight season. Grundman was succeeded as GM by Serge Savard.

=== Municipal politics ===
Grundman worked as a city councilor for over 35 years. At one time, he was the longest-serving politician in Montreal. During his tenure, he served as the executive chairman of St-Laurent Technoparc and played a pivotal part in its development. He was also recognized for his role in bringing in several large companies to do business in Montreal. He ran for public office for the last time in the 2001 municipal election and characterized himself as a "fighter by nature" despite being 72 years old at the time.

Grundman was arrested on April 29, 2002, together with fellow councillor Rene Dussault. They were charged in relation to receiving a $75,000 cash bribe from an undercover provincial police officer earlier that year, ostensibly in exchange for amending a municipal zoning bylaw. Grundman pleaded guilty to municipal corruption in September 2004, with eight other charges being stayed. He also resigned from Union Montreal that same month. In January 2005, he received a conditional sentence of 23 months to be served in the community and was fined $50,000. He proceeded to resign as a city councilor.

== Personal life ==
Grundman was married to Goldie Gail (Schreiber) for 60 years before her death. Together, they had three children: Howard, Gary, and Pamela, who predeceased him. He was his wife's primary caregiver during her final years, when she was afflicted with Alzheimer's disease.

Grundman died at the age of 92 on February 26, 2021, after a short illness.

Preceded by Sam Pollock	General Manager of the Montreal Canadiens; 1978–83	Succeeded by Serge Savard
