= Sam Pollock =

Canadian sports executive (1925–2007)

Sam Pollock OC CQ
- Born: Samuel Patterson Smyth Pollock; December 15, 1925; Montreal, Quebec
- Died: August 15, 2007 (aged 81); Toronto, Ontario
- Occupation: former NHL general manager
- Awards: Hockey Hall of Fame (1978), Canadian Sports Hall of Fame (1982)

Samuel Patterson Smyth Pollock, OC, CQ (December 15, 1925 – August 15, 2007) was a Canadian sports executive who was general manager of the National Hockey League's Montreal Canadiens for 14 years during which they won nine Stanley Cups. Pollock also was chairman and CEO of the Toronto Blue Jays baseball club.

== Life ==
Born in Montreal, Quebec, Sam was a keen evaluator of talent. In 1950, with the Montreal Junior Canadiens and in 1958, with the Ottawa-Hull Junior Canadiens, he won the Memorial Cup. The Montreal Canadiens saw potential in Pollock and quickly hired him to be the successor to Frank J. Selke, as Personnel Director from 1959 to 1964. In 1964, Selke retired and Sam took over his job as general manager of the Habs.

He spent 14 years with the club as general manager before giving up the job in summer of 1978. He spent one last season with Montreal on their board of directors, before retiring in summer of 1979. Pollock's name was included on the Stanley Cup 12 times, including an NHL record nine as a general manager. Pollock and head coach Scotty Bowman together not only presided over a Canadiens dynasty, but also many of their players went on to have successful coaching and managing roles with their own teams.

Pollock died on August 15, 2007, at the age of 81 in Toronto, Ontario. Pollock is survived by his wife Mimi, son Sam Jr., and daughters Rachel and Mary. Pollock was buried at Ste Elisabeth Roman Catholic Cemetery in North Hatley, Quebec.

== Key trades ==
Pollock believed drafting good young prospects was the key to long-term success in the NHL. To this end he was always planning, sometimes years in advance, in order to be in position to pick up the "cream of the crop" in any annual entry level draft.

Among his shrewdest moves was a series of trades in which the Canadiens obtained the first overall pick in the 1971 NHL entry draft, the year in which Guy Lafleur would be eligible. It appeared as if the first overall selection would be held by the California Golden Seals so he persuaded Seals' management to trade their pick and François Lacombe in return for Montreal's first round pick and a 23-year-old rookie, Ernie Hicke. Pollock hesitated between Guy Lafleur and Marcel Dionne, but he chose Lafleur with his overall no.1 pick.

On another occasion he traded two college prospects to Boston for a young goalie named Ken Dryden. He was also instrumental in acquiring Larry Robinson, Serge Savard, Guy Lapointe, and Yvan Cournoyer, all of whom would become superstars for the Canadiens.

In another deal, one which was never consummated, New York Islanders GM Bill Torrey drafted defenceman Denis Potvin first overall in the 1973 entry draft; Pollock approached Torrey, hoping to trade for Potvin. Pollock's strategy was to offer a "quick-fix" package of mature players in exchange for the top draft pick. Although it was tempting, as the Islanders would immediately benefit from the trade, Torrey ultimately turned down the offer. Potvin went on to be a long-term asset to the Islanders, leading them to 4 consecutive Stanley Cups and anchoring their blueline for 15 years.

== Accolades ==
- In 1976, he was the general manager for Team Canada which won the inaugural Canada Cup.
- Stanley Cup Champion - 1960 as personnel director
- Stanley Cup Champion - 1965, 1966, 1968, 1969, 1971, 1973, 1976, 1977, 1978, as vice president/general manager
- Stanley Cup Champion - 1979 as a member of board of directors. (all 12 with the Montreal Canadiens)
- In 1978, he was inducted into the Hockey Hall of Fame as a builder and later into the Canadian Sports Hall of Fame. In the 1990s, when the Hockey Hall of Fame relocated to downtown Toronto, the indoor public square at the end of the Allen Lambert Galleria at Brookfield Place was named Sam Pollock Square.
- In 1985, he was made an Officer of the Order of Canada and a Knight of the National Order of Quebec in 2002.
- He was also chairman and CEO of Major League Baseball's Toronto Blue Jays from 1995 to 2000. The Blue Jays honoured him by wearing a patch bearing his initials on the sleeve of their jerseys.

== Baseball ==
Pollock was CEO and chair of the Toronto Blue Jays from 1995 to 2000.

Preceded by Frank J. Selke	General manager of the Montreal Canadiens; 1964–1978	Succeeded by Irving Grundman
Preceded by Paul Beeston (President and CEO) and Peter Hardy (Chairman)	Toronto Blue Jays Chairman and CEO; 1995–1999	Succeeded by Paul V. Godfrey
