= El Senador =

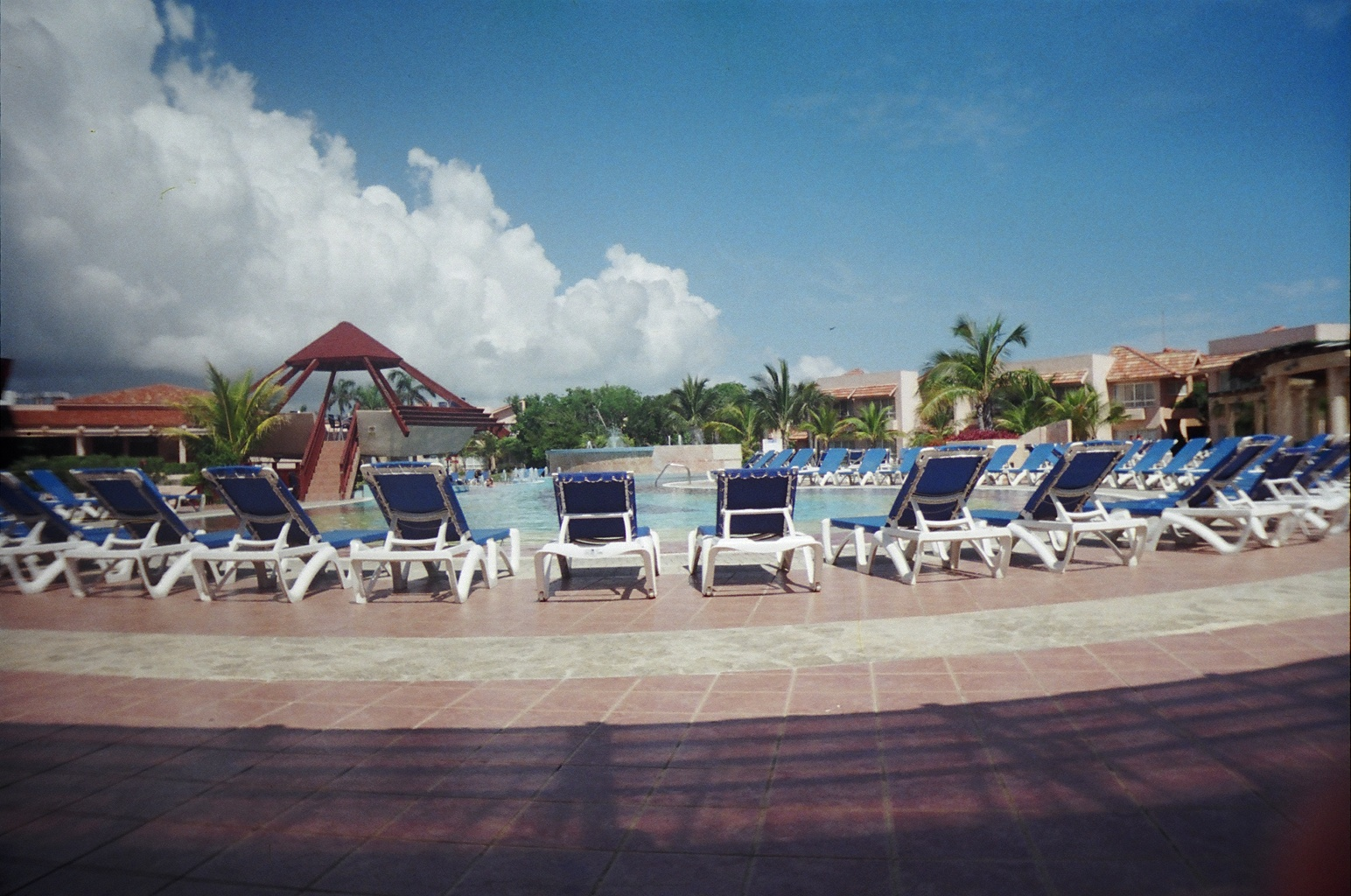
One of the pools at El Senador

El Senador is the original name of a luxury 4-star resort located in Cayo Coco, Cuba. It was owned as a joint venture between Cubanacan, a Cuban tourism company, and a syndicate of Canadian businesses. In December 2005 the Canadians sold their interest to an Anglo-Dutch syndicate, and the owners engaged the Spanish group NH Hotels as operator. The resort was renamed the NH Krystal Laguna Villas and Resort, until December 2010, when NH ceased to manage it. In 2012 the hotel was separated into two parts, both to be managed by the Iberostar group - part branded the Iberostar Mojito and the other the Iberostar Cayo Coco.

Former NHL star and captain of the Montreal Canadiens, Serge Savard, was also part owner. The name "El Senador" was a reference to his nickname "Le Senateur" (The Senator).

The company which owns the hotel is El Senador S.A.
