= Yvan Cournoyer =

Canadian ice hockey player (born 1943)

OC Yvan Cournoyer
- Hockey Hall of Fame, 1982
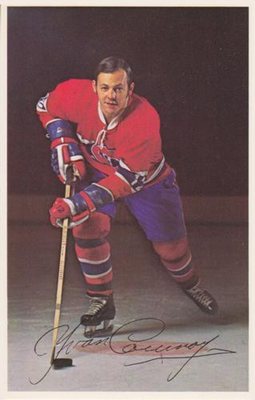
- Cournoyer with the Montreal Canadiens in 1970
- Born: November 22, 1943 (age 82) Drummondville, Quebec, Canada
- Height: 5 ft 7 in (170 cm)
- Weight: 172 lb (78 kg; 12 st 4 lb)
- Position: Right Wing
- Shot: Left
- Played for: Montreal Canadiens
- National team: Canada
- Playing career: 1963–1978

Yvan Serge Cournoyer OC (born November 22, 1943) is a Canadian former professional ice hockey right winger who played in the National Hockey League (NHL) for the Montreal Canadiens for 16 seasons, between 1963 to 1978, winning the Stanley Cup 10 times. In 1972, Cournoyer scored the tying goal in the deciding eighth game of the Canada-USSR series with seven minutes remaining. Canada went on to win the game and the series on Paul Henderson's dramatic goal with 34 seconds left in the game.

Born in Drummondville, Quebec, he was nicknamed "the Roadrunner" due to his small size and blazing speed, which he credited to longer blades on his skates. He was inducted into the Hockey Hall of Fame in 1982 and named one of the '100 Greatest NHL Players' in 2017.

== Playing career ==
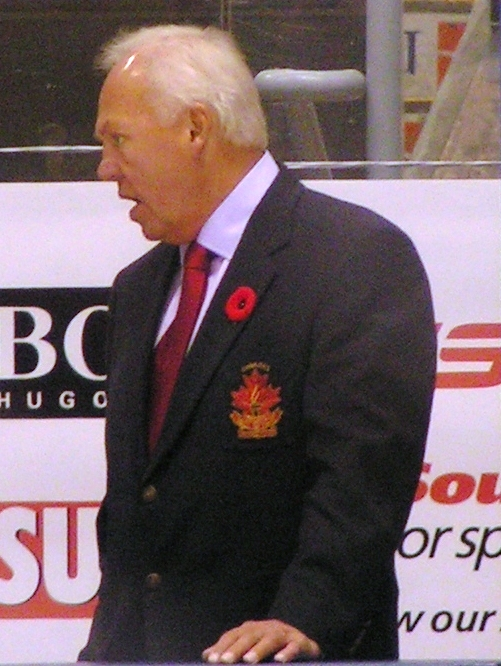
Cournoyer in 2008

In 1961, Cournoyer started his junior ice hockey with the Montreal Junior Canadiens of the Ontario Hockey Association. By the time he was 18 years old, his legs had become so muscular that he required specially tailored pants.

Cournoyer made his NHL debut in 1963 with the Montreal Canadiens and earned a full-time spot with the club in 1964 after just seven games with the American Hockey League's Quebec Aces. Mark Mulvoy of Sports Illustrated was credited with giving Cournoyer the nickname, Roadrunner, with "Cournoyer joking at the time that now he had to live up to the label".

Cournoyer was initially regarded by Canadiens head coach Toe Blake as a defensive liability and undeserving of a regular shift, though he was still frequently used on the power play. That changed after Blake's departure following the Canadiens' 1968 Stanley Cup Championship, when incoming coach Claude Ruel granted Cournoyer a full-time shift. Cournoyer went on to have his first 40-goal season in 1968–69 and was named to the NHL's Second All-Star Team.

Cournoyer scored a career-high 47 goals in the 1972–73 season. In the 1973 Stanley Cup playoffs, he had his best playoffs ever, scoring 15 goals and tallying 10 assists in 17 games, earning the Conn Smythe Trophy following the Canadiens' defeat of the Chicago Black Hawks in the Finals.

Cournoyer was named captain of the Canadiens in 1975 following the retirement of Henri Richard, pushing him to play harder in his new leadership role. Cournoyer would become one of the Habs' two captains to win the Stanley Cup each year during his entire (2+ year) tenure as captain, the other one being Maurice Richard, Henri's older brother. However, while Maurice Richard captained the team on ice for each of these Cup wins, Cournoyer missed the entirety of two of the four postseasons of his teams' Cup wins, although Cournoyer still qualified to have his name engraved on the Cup during these instances.

The speedy Cournoyer's ability to stay true to his form in his older age was a favourite topic of discussion of the Montreal fans and hockey media, however, and he did slow down due to a disc in his back that was pressing on a nerve and causing him great pain. Cournoyer eventually had to have surgery on his back and missed the entire 1977 playoffs.

Cournoyer returned for the 1977–78 season and played in 68 games, scoring 24 goals and collecting 29 assists to match his previous season's total of 53 points, though it was evident his back still bothered him. He managed to perform in the playoffs again, managing seven goals and four assists in 15 games en route to Montreal's third consecutive Cup. However, he played in just fifteen regular season games and missed the entire playoffs during the 1978–79 season, although the Habs did win their fourth straight Cup.

When he retired, he only trailed Maurice Richard, and Jean Beliveau on the Canadiens' all-time scoring list. Cournoyer won the Stanley Cup ten times as a player (tied with Beliveau), second to Henri Richard's 11. The Cournoyer legacy includes many Top 10 Canadien records - seventh in total games played (968), fourth in goals scored (428), seventh in assists (435) and sixth in total points scored (863).

=== Team Canada ===
Cournoyer played for Canada in the 1972 Summit Series and is part of the famous picture wherein Paul Henderson jumps into his arms after scoring the game (and series) winner. Cournoyer scored three goals during the series. Late in the third period of game eight, his goal tied the score, making a win by Canada possible.

== Post-playing career ==
Cournoyer coached the Montreal Roadrunners, an inline hockey team, during the 1994–95 Roller Hockey International season and was later an assistant coach to the Montreal Canadiens during the 1996–97 season. He serves as an official ambassador for the Montreal Canadiens. On November 12, 2005, Cournoyer and Dickie Moore had their #12 jersey retired by Montreal prior to a home game at the Bell Centre.

In 2026, he was named an Officer of the Order of Canada.

== Career statistics ==
=== Regular season and playoffs ===
			Regular season					Playoffs
Season	Team	League	GP	G	A	Pts	PIM	GP	G	A	Pts	PIM
1960–61	Lachine Maroons	MMJHL	42	37	31	68	—	—	—	—	—
1961–62	Montreal Junior Canadiens	OHA	32	15	16	31	8	6	4	4	8	0
1962–63	Montreal Junior Canadiens	OHA	36	37	27	64	24	10	3	4	7	6
1963–64	Montreal Junior Canadiens	OHA	53	63	48	111	30	17	19	8	27	15
1963–64	Montreal Canadiens	NHL	5	4	0	4	0	—	—	—	—	—
1964–65	Montreal Canadiens	NHL	55	7	10	17	10	12	3	1	4	0
1964–65	Quebec Aces	AHL	7	2	1	3	0	—	—	—	—	—
1965–66	Montreal Canadiens	NHL	65	18	11	29	8	10	2	3	5	2
1966–67	Montreal Canadiens	NHL	69	25	15	40	14	10	2	3	5	6
1967–68	Montreal Canadiens	NHL	64	28	32	60	23	13	6	8	14	4
1968–69	Montreal Canadiens	NHL	76	43	44	87	31	14	4	7	11	5
1969–70	Montreal Canadiens	NHL	72	27	36	63	23	—	—	—	—	—
1970–71	Montreal Canadiens	NHL	65	37	36	73	21	20	10	12	22	6
1971–72	Montreal Canadiens	NHL	73	47	36	83	15	6	2	1	3	2
1972–73	Montreal Canadiens	NHL	67	40	39	79	18	17	15	10	25	2
1973–74	Montreal Canadiens	NHL	67	40	33	73	18	6	5	2	7	2
1974–75	Montreal Canadiens	NHL	76	29	45	74	32	11	5	6	11	4
1975–76	Montreal Canadiens	NHL	71	32	36	68	20	13	3	6	9	4
1976–77	Montreal Canadiens	NHL	60	25	28	53	8	—	—	—	—	—
1977–78	Montreal Canadiens	NHL	68	24	29	53	12	15	7	4	11	10
1978–79	Montreal Canadiens	NHL	15	2	5	7	2	—	—	—	—	—
NHL totals			968	428	435	863	255	147	64	63	127	47

=== International ===
Year	Team	Event	GP	G	A	Pts	PIM
1972	Canada	SS	8	3	2	5	2
Senior totals			8	3	2	5	2

== See also ==
- List of players with five or more goals in an NHL game
- List of NHL players who spent their entire career with one franchise

Preceded by Henri Richard	Montreal Canadiens captain 1975–79	Succeeded by Serge Savard
Preceded by Bobby Orr	Winner of the Conn Smythe Trophy; 1973	Succeeded by Bernie Parent
