= Claude Ruel =

Canadian ice hockey coach (1938–2015)

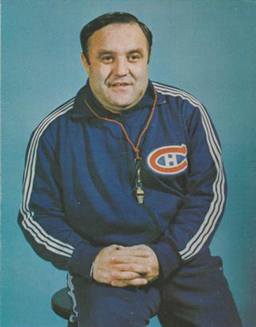
- Born: September 12, 1938 Sherbrooke, Quebec, Canada
- Died: February 9, 2015 (aged 76) Longueuil, Quebec, Canada
- Coached for: Montreal Canadiens

Claude Ruel (September 12, 1938 – February 9, 2015) was a professional ice hockey coach for the Montreal Canadiens of the National Hockey League (NHL).

Ruel was raised in Sherbrooke, where he played hockey and was regarded as a highly promising young defenseman, even though he was smaller in size. However, in 1958, he suffered a serious injury when a deflected puck hit him in the eye. He spent three months in the hospital recovering, but the damage was permanent, and he lost his vision in that eye.

In the early 1960s, Ruel began his coaching career with the Montreal Junior Canadiens. He soon became an integral figure in the Canadiens' development system, working as a leading scout. Eventually, he was promoted to the NHL club's front office, where he took on the role of director of player development.

Ruel was hired to coach the Habs in 1968, replacing the legendary Toe Blake. He led a talented group of players to a Stanley Cup championship during his first year. However, the following season, Montreal was the odd team out in a tight, five-team "Original Six" battle for four playoff spots. He started the 1970-71 season behind the bench, but decided to step down 23 games into the season because the pressure of life behind the bench was affecting his health. He subsequently returned to his role as director of player development, but he took over as Montreal's coach again in 1979, leading the team for one and a half years during the waning days of the 1970s dynasty.

Ruel died on February 9, 2015.

== Coaching record ==
Team	Year	Regular season						Postseason			
Team	Year	G	W	L	T	Pts	Finish	W	L	Win %	Result
MTL	1968–69	76	46	19	11	103	1st in East	12	2	.857	Won Stanley Cup (STL)
MTL	1969–70	76	38	22	16	92	5th in East	—	—	—	Missed playoffs
MTL	1970–71	23	11	8	4	(97)	(resigned)	—	—	—	—
MTL	1979–80	50	32	11	7	(107)	1st in Norris	6	4	.600	Lost in quarterfinals (MNS)
MTL	1980–81	80	45	22	13	102	1st in Norris	0	3	.000	Lost in preliminary round (EDM)
Total		305	172	82	51			18	9	.667	

Preceded by Toe Blake	Head coach of the Montreal Canadiens; 1968–70	Succeeded by Al MacNeil
Preceded by Bernie Geoffrion	Head coach of the Montreal Canadiens; 1979–81	Succeeded by Bob Berry
