= John Ferguson Sr. =

Canadian ice hockey player, executive (1938–2007)

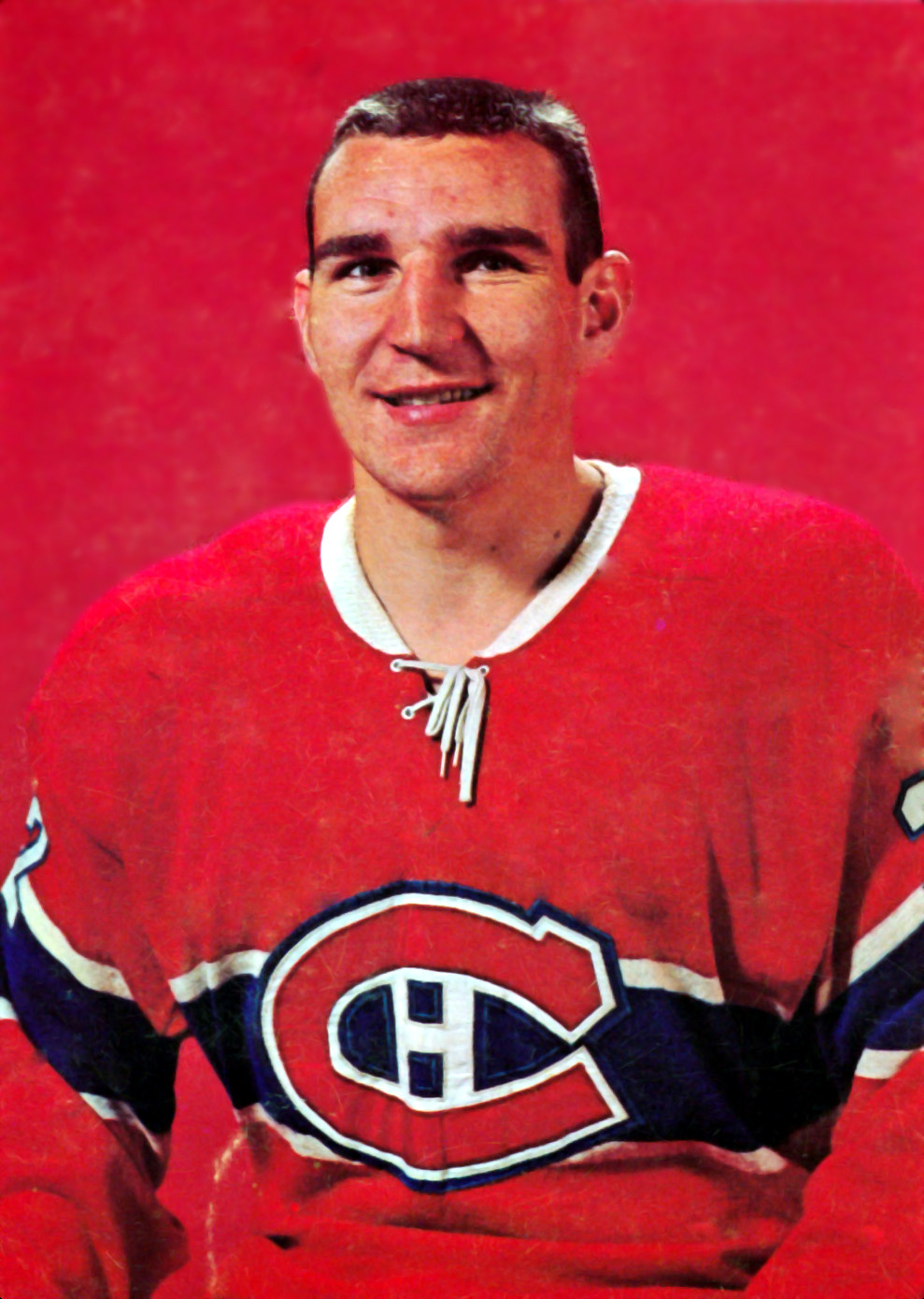
- John Ferguson Sr, Montreal Canadiens
- Born: September 5, 1938 Vancouver, British Columbia, Canada
- Died: July 14, 2007 (aged 68) Windsor, Ontario, Canada
- Height: 5 ft 11 in (180 cm)
- Weight: 178 lb (81 kg; 12 st 10 lb)
- Position: Left wing
- Shot: Left
- Played for: Montreal Canadiens
- Playing career: 1959–1971

John Bowie "Fergy" Ferguson Sr. (September 5, 1938 – July 14, 2007) was a professional ice hockey player and executive. Ferguson played left wing for the Montreal Canadiens from 1963 to 1971. After retiring from active play, he became a coach, and later a general manager. He is the father of John Ferguson Jr.

== Early years ==
Ferguson was born in Vancouver, British Columbia on September 5, 1938. His father died when he was 9, and he was raised by his mother near the Pacific National Exhibition grounds. Ferguson loved horses and hung around Hastings Park as a child. Aside from his interest in horses and hockey, he also played lacrosse. Ferguson's hockey career began as a stickboy for the Vancouver Canucks, then of the Western Hockey League. He became interested in the role of enforcer when he saw the more talented Canucks players get hit repeatedly, without having their teammates attempt to respond or dissuade their opponents.

== Playing career ==
Ferguson played his junior hockey in Western Canada, with the Melville Millionaires of the Saskatchewan Junior Hockey League in 1956–57, and 1958–59. In 1959–60, he was playing professionally with the Fort Wayne Komets of the International Hockey League. In 1960, he moved to the American Hockey League and the Cleveland Barons.

In 1963–64, he was promoted to the Canadiens as an "enforcer" to protect captain Jean Beliveau from aggressive defenders—merely twelve seconds into his first NHL game, he was in a fight with Ted Green of the Boston Bruins; Ferguson won the fight. It was said that his unexpected retirement in 1971 caused problems for the Canadiens, who then started getting roughed up by other teams. Rumours persisted that General Manager Sam Pollock wanted to bring him out of retirement.

Ferguson was also a potential offensive threat. Playing on a line with Beliveau, Ferguson led all NHL rookies in scoring in his first season and finished as runner-up for Calder Trophy in 1963–64. The 5-foot-11, 190-pound left-winger also scored the Stanley Cup-winning goal in 1969, during a season that saw him score a career-high 29 goals with a plus-30 rating. In 85 post-season games, he scored 20 goals and added 18 assists. He also earned two selections to the NHL All-Star Game.

During his playing career, he won the Stanley Cup five times: in the years 1965, 1966, 1968, 1969, and 1971, and always earned more than 100 penalty minutes in a regular season.

== Sorel Titans ==
Ferguson was coach for the Sorel Titans, one of six semi-professional Quebec Lacrosse League clubs that played in the 1960s. In supporting the league, Ferguson told the Victoria Times Colonist newspaper: "I hope both ends of the country can bring the game out of the bushes and bring back an interest. Lacrosse needs expansion."

== Post-playing career ==
In 1972, he became the assistant coach of Team Canada who defeated the Soviet team in the Summit Series. Ferguson gained some notoriety because he asked Bobby Clarke to take out Soviet star Valeri Kharlamov with a slash to the latter's ankle. Ferguson later justified his orders saying "that guy is killing us."

In the years to follow, he became the head coach and later general manager of the New York Rangers. He lured Anders Hedberg and Ulf Nilsson away from the Winnipeg Jets of the World Hockey Association (WHA) in 1978 to the Rangers. Both were considered to be the Jets' best players, and among the best in the WHA as a whole. Ferguson stopped coaching in 1977, and was fired as general manager in 1978, at which time he became the general manager of the Jets in the WHA and, starting in 1979, the National Hockey League.

He worked for the Ottawa Senators in the early 1990s as director of player personnel. He is credited with finding Daniel Alfredsson for the Senators. He was a special consultant to the general manager of the San Jose Sharks.

== Later years and death ==
Ferguson was married to Joan, and they had four children together: John Jr. (former general manager of the Toronto Maple Leafs), Catherine, Chris and Joanne.

He and his wife lived in Windsor, Ontario in his later years to be close to horses. He served as GM for the Windsor Raceway in 1988.

In September 2005, Ferguson was diagnosed with prostate cancer. He died on July 14, 2007.

== Career statistics ==
Bold indicates led league

			Regular season					Playoffs
Season	Team	League	GP	G	A	Pts	PIM	GP	G	A	Pts	PIM
1956–57	Melville Millionaires	SJHL	51	11	17	28	49	—	—	—	—	—
1957–58	Melville Millionaires	SJHL	50	14	30	44	100	—	—	—	—	—
1958–59	Melville Millionaires	SJHL	44	32	34	66	83	—	—	—	—	—
1959–60	Fort Wayne Komets	IHL	68	32	33	65	126	13	1	1	2	17
1960–61	Cleveland Barons	AHL	62	13	21	34	126	—	—	—	—	—
1961–62	Cleveland Barons	AHL	70	20	21	41	146	6	2	2	4	6
1962–63	Cleveland Barons	AHL	72	38	40	78	179	7	3	3	6	17
1963–64	Montreal Canadiens	NHL	59	18	27	45	125	7	0	1	1	25
1964–65	Montreal Canadiens	NHL	69	17	27	44	156	13	3	1	4	28
1965–66	Montreal Canadiens	NHL	65	11	14	25	153	10	2	0	2	**44**
1966–67	Montreal Canadiens	NHL	67	20	22	42	**177**	10	4	2	6	22
1967–68	Montreal Canadiens	NHL	61	15	18	33	117	13	3	5	8	25
1968–69	Montreal Canadiens	NHL	71	29	23	52	185	**14**	4	3	7	**80**
1969–70	Montreal Canadiens	NHL	48	19	13	32	139	—	—	—	—	—
1970–71	Montreal Canadiens	NHL	60	16	14	30	162	18	4	6	10	36
AHL totals			204	71	82	153	451	13	5	5	10	23
NHL totals			500	145	158	303	1214	85	20	18	38	260

== Coaching record ==
Team	Year	Regular season						Postseason
Team	Year	G	W	L	T	Pts	Division rank	Result
NYR	1975–76	41	14	22	5	(67)	4th in Patrick	Missed Playoffs
NYR	1976–77	80	29	37	14	72	4th in Patrick	Missed Playoffs
WPG	1985–86	14	7	6	1	(59)	3rd in Smythe	Lost in First round
Total		135	50	65	20	120		

== See also ==
- Notable families in the NHL

Preceded by Ron Stewart	Head coach of the New York Rangers; 1976–77	Succeeded by Jean-Guy Talbot
Preceded by Emile Francis	General Manager of the New York Rangers; 1976–78	Succeeded by Fred Shero
Preceded by Rudy Pilous	General Manager of the Winnipeg Jets; 1978–88	Succeeded by Mike Smith
Preceded by Barry Long	Head coach of the Winnipeg Jets; 1986	Succeeded by Dan Maloney
