= Jean-Guy Talbot =

Canadian ice hockey player and coach (1932–2024)

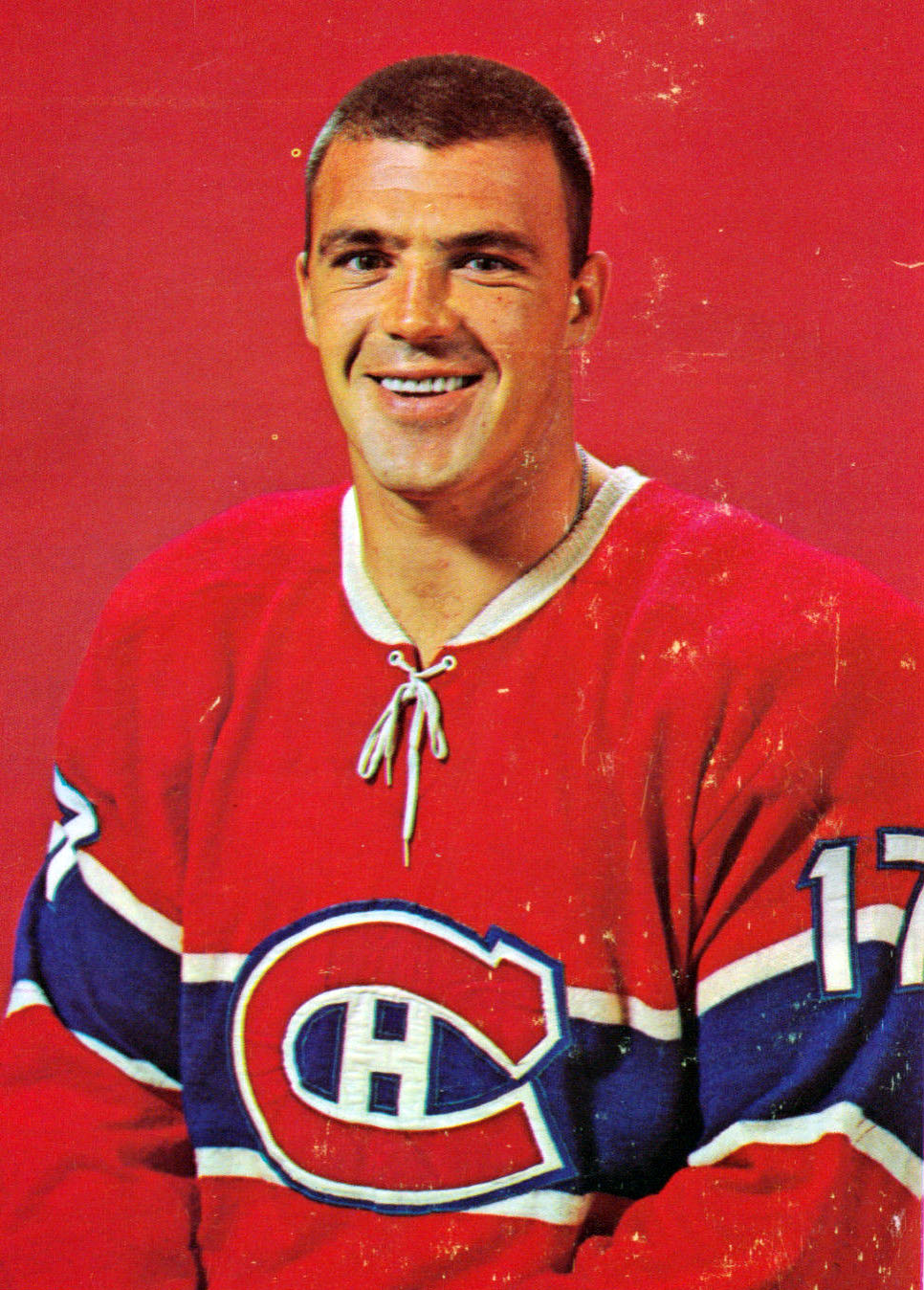
- Talbot with the Montreal Canadiens, c. 1963
- Born: July 11, 1932 Cap-de-la-Madeleine, Quebec, Canada
- Died: February 22, 2024 (aged 91) Trois-Rivières, Quebec, Canada
- Height: 5 ft 11 in (180 cm)
- Weight: 170 lb (77 kg; 12 st 2 lb)
- Position: Defence
- Shot: Left
- Played for: Montreal Canadiens; Minnesota North Stars; Detroit Red Wings; St. Louis Blues; Buffalo Sabres
- Playing career: 1952–1971

Jean-Guy Talbot (July 11, 1932 – February 22, 2024) was a Canadian professional ice hockey defenceman and coach who played 17 seasons in the National Hockey League (NHL).

Talbot made his NHL debut with the Montreal Canadiens during the 1954–55 season. In thirteen seasons with the Canadiens he was a six-time NHL All-Star and part of a dynasty that won seven Stanley Cup Championships. He left the Canadiens after the 1966–67 season, and in 1967-68 he played briefly for the Minnesota North Stars and the Detroit Red Wings before being acquired by the St. Louis Blues, with whom he remained until 1970. He spent his final season as a player with the Buffalo Sabres.

He began his coaching career with the Denver Spurs of the Western Hockey League, winning the Lester Patrick Cup in 1972. He then served as head coach for the St. Louis Blues from 1972 to 1974. In 1975, he served as head coach for the Denver Spurs/Ottawa Civics of the World Hockey Association until the team folded in early 1976. He held his final head coaching position for the New York Rangers during the 1977–1978 season.

== Early life ==
Talbot was born in Cap-de-la-Madeleine on July 11, 1932. His father, Willie, worked as a steamfitter at a paper mill. Talbot initially played as goaltender until he conceded 22 goals in a game for his elementary school. While playing junior hockey, Talbot slashed Scotty Bowman in the head with his stick, causing a fractured skull and ending Bowman's playing career. Talbot consequently received a one-year suspension from the Quebec Amateur Hockey Association. Although this was eventually reduced to nine months, he exceeded the age limit to play junior hockey upon his return. He played for the Quebec Aces of the Quebec Senior Hockey League from 1952 to 1954, then joined the Shawinigan-Falls Cataracts for one season.

== Professional career ==
Talbot made his National Hockey League (NHL) debut for the Montreal Canadiens on February 13, 1955, against the New York Rangers at Madison Square Garden. He only played in two other games and spent the rest of that season in the minors, but made the Canadiens' roster the following year. He played the full schedule for three consecutive seasons from 1960 to 1963.

Talbot played in the NHL from 1955 to 1971, for the Minnesota North Stars, Detroit Red Wings, St. Louis Blues, Buffalo Sabres and Montreal Canadiens. With the Canadiens, he won seven Stanley Cup championships.

Talbot was well known for being a sound passer. He was also known for having a clean but rather physical style of play which ultimately helped Montreal win Stanley Cups. Talbot wore jersey #17 during his time with Montreal.

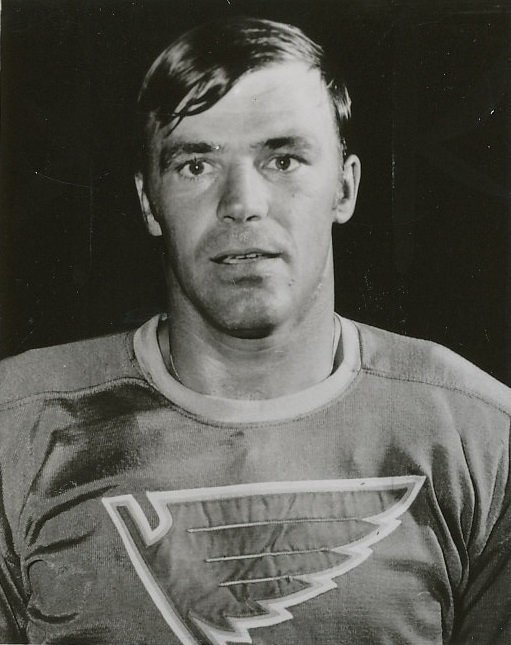
Talbot in 1970 with St. Louis

Talbot played 1,056 games, scoring 43 goals and adding 242 assists for 285 points. He was also assessed 1,006 penalty minutes. He was voted a First-Team All-Star in 1961–62 and was selected for six all-star games (1956, 1957, 1960, 1962, 1965 and 1967). He finished third in voting for the James Norris Memorial Trophy in 1961–62. At the time of his death, he won the second-most championships without having been inducted into the Hockey Hall of Fame, behind his former teammate Claude Provost's nine.

== Coaching career ==
Talbot became head coach of the St. Louis Blues in 1972, replacing Al Arbour, who had been fired from the position. He resigned the position in February 1974. He signed on as head coach for the New York Rangers in 1977, taking over from John Ferguson, with whom he had played during his time with the Canadiens. While with the Rangers, Talbot wore a warm-up suit behind the bench during games, rather than a business suit as most coaches wore.

== Personal life ==
Talbot was married to Pierrette Cormier for 72 years until his death. They had three children and resided in Trois-Rivières, Quebec. Both his sons were awarded hockey scholarships from the University of Denver and State University of New York at Plattsburgh, respectively. However, Talbot dissuaded them from pursuing the sport unless they could reach the NHL.

Talbot died in Trois-Rivières on February 22, 2024, at the age of 91. He was the second-last surviving player out of the twelve that played for all five Canadiens teams that captured an NHL record five straight Stanley Cups between 1956 and 1960. The last survivor, Donnie Marshall, died on October 8, 2024.

== Coaching record ==
=== NHL/WHA ===
Team	Year	Regular season						Postseason			
Team	Year	G	W	L	T	Pts	Finish	W	L	Win %	Result
STL	1972–73	65	30	28	7	67	4th in West	1	4	.200	Lost in league quarterfinals CHI)
STL	1973–74	55	22	25	8	52	(fired)	—	—	—	—
NYR	1977–78	80	30	37	13	73	4th in Patrick	1	2	.333	Lost in preliminary round (BUF)
DEN/OTT	1975–76	41	14	26	1	29	(team folded)	—	—	—	—
NHL Total		200	82	90	28	192		2	6	.250	
WHA Total		41	14	26	1	29		—	—	—	—
Pro Total		241	96	116	29			2	6	.250	

Source:Source:

=== Western Hockey League ===
Team	Year	Regular season						Postseason
Team	Year	G	W	L	T	Pts	Finish	Result
Denver Spurs	1971–72	72	44	20	8	96	1st in WHL	Won in league semi-finals (4–0 vs. SD); Won Lester Patrick Cup (4–1 vs. POR)
Denver Spurs	1972–73	9	3	6	0	6	4th in WHL	Promoted to St. Louis Blues
WHL Total (1971–1973)		81	47	26	8	102		(8–1, 0.889 – 1 Lester Patrick Cup)

=== Central Hockey League ===
Team	Year	Regular season						Postseason
Team	Year	G	W	L	OTL	Pts	Finish	Result
Denver Spurs	1974–75	78	36	29	13	85	2nd in Northern	Lost in division semi-final (0–2 vs. OMA)
CHL Total (1974–1975)		78	36	29	13	85		(0–2, 0.000)

== Awards and accomplishments ==
- Stanley Cup champion (1956, 1957, 1958, 1959, 1960, 1965 and 1966) (all with Montreal)
- 1961–62 NHL All-Star team (1st)
- Played in 1956, 1957, 1958, 1960, 1962, 1965 and 1967 NHL All-Star game.

== Career statistics ==
			Regular season					Playoffs
Season	Team	League	GP	G	A	Pts	PIM	GP	G	A	Pts	PIM
1949–50	Trois-Rivieres Reds	QJHL	36	3	4	7	79	9	0	3	3	12
1950–51	Trois-Rivieres Reds	QJHL	44	7	22	29	136	8	0	1	1	18
1950–51	Shawinigan Cataracts	QSHL	1	0	0	0	0	—	—	—	—	—
1951–52	Trois-Rivieres Reds	QJHL	43	12	36	48	132	4	1	0	1	12
1952–53	Quebec Aces	QHL	24	2	4	6	33	—	—	—	—	—
1953–54	Quebec Aces	QHL	67	9	11	20	58	16	0	2	2	12
1953–54	Quebec Aces	Ed-Cup	—	—	—	—	—	7	2	0	2	2
1954–55	Montreal Canadiens	NHL	3	0	1	1	0	—	—	—	—	—
1954–55	Shawinigan Cataracts	QHL	59	6	28	34	82	13	2	5	7	14
1954–55	Shawinigan Cataracts	Ed-Cup	—	—	—	—	—	7	0	2	2	6
1955–56*	Montreal Canadiens	NHL	66	1	13	14	80	9	0	2	2	4
1956–57*	Montreal Canadiens	NHL	59	0	13	13	70	10	0	2	2	10
1957–58*	Montreal Canadiens	NHL	55	4	15	19	65	10	0	3	3	12
1958–59*	Montreal Canadiens	NHL	69	4	17	21	77	11	0	1	1	10
1959–60*	Montreal Canadiens	NHL	69	1	14	15	60	8	1	1	2	8
1960–61	Montreal Canadiens	NHL	70	5	26	31	143	6	1	1	2	10
1961–62	Montreal Canadiens	NHL	70	5	42	47	90	6	1	1	2	10
1962–63	Montreal Canadiens	NHL	70	3	22	25	51	5	0	0	0	8
1963–64	Montreal Canadiens	NHL	66	1	13	14	83	7	0	2	2	10
1964–65*	Montreal Canadiens	NHL	67	8	14	22	64	13	0	1	1	22
1965–66*	Montreal Canadiens	NHL	59	1	14	15	50	10	0	2	2	8
1966–67	Montreal Canadiens	NHL	68	3	5	8	51	10	0	0	0	0
1967–68	Minnesota North Stars	NHL	4	0	0	0	4	—	—	—	—	—
1967–68	Detroit Red Wings	NHL	32	0	3	3	10	—	—	—	—	—
1967–68	St. Louis Blues	NHL	23	0	4	4	2	17	0	2	2	8
1968–69	St. Louis Blues	NHL	69	5	4	9	24	12	0	2	2	6
1969–70	St. Louis Blues	NHL	75	2	15	17	40	16	1	6	7	16
1970–71	Buffalo Sabres	NHL	57	0	7	7	36	—	—	—	—	—
NHL totals			1,056	43	242	285	1,006	150	4	26	30	142

== See also ==
- List of NHL players with 1,000 games played

Preceded by Al Arbour	Head coach of the St. Louis Blues; 1972–74	Succeeded by Lou Angotti
Preceded by John Ferguson, Sr.	Head coach of the New York Rangers; 1977–78	Succeeded by Fred Shero
