= 1966–67 NHL season =

National Hockey League season

- League: National Hockey League
- Sport: Ice hockey
- Duration: October 19, 1966 – May 2, 1967
- Games: 70
- Teams: 6
- TV partner(s): CBC, CTV, SRC (Canada); CBS, RKO General (United States)

Draft
- Top draft pick: Barry Gibbs
- Picked by: Boston Bruins

Regular season
- Season champion: Chicago Black Hawks
- Season MVP: Stan Mikita (Black Hawks)
- Top scorer: Stan Mikita (Black Hawks)

Playoffs
- Playoffs MVP: Dave Keon (Maple Leafs)

Stanley Cup
- Champions: Toronto Maple Leafs
- Runners-up: Montreal Canadiens

NHL seasons
- ← 1965–66 1967–68 →

The 1966–67 NHL season was the 50th season of the National Hockey League. This was the last season of only six teams playing 70 games each, as six more teams were added for the 1967–68 season. This season saw the debut of one of the greatest players in hockey history, defenceman Bobby Orr of the Boston Bruins. The Toronto Maple Leafs defeated the Montreal Canadiens four games to two in the Stanley Cup Finals to win the Stanley Cup for the thirteenth time in franchise history; to date this is the Leafs' last Stanley Cup victory.

== League business ==
President David Molson of the Canadian Arena Company announced that the Montreal Forum would undergo major alterations in a $5 million work program commencing in April 1968.

The fourth NHL amateur draft was held on April 25, 1966, at the Mount Royal Hotel in Montreal, Quebec. Barry Gibbs was selected first overall by the Boston Bruins.

NHL president Clarence Campbell and Canadian Amateur Hockey Association (CAHA) president Fred Page announced a new five-year professional-agreement effective on July 1, 1967. The direct sponsorship of junior ice hockey teams by the NHL was to be phased out in the upcoming year, and no new sponsored players could be registered or be required to sign a contract restricting movement between teams. The agreement eliminated the A, B and C forms, which had angered the parents of amateur players and were the source of legal action threats when the professional team refused to release a player. Page succeeded in getting junior-aged players to be eligible for the NHL amateur draft once they graduate from junior hockey, or to be signed as a free agent in the year the player reaches his 20th birthday. The NHL agreed to pay development fees to the CAHA for the drafted players, and it allowed the CAHA to distribute the fees. The new agreement came at a time that also leveled the playing field for new NHL clubs in the 1967 NHL expansion.

== Regular season ==
Bobby Orr made his NHL debut on October 19, with an assist in a 6–2 win over Detroit.

On November 9, Ed Giacomin was subjected to one of the cruelest displays of fan abuse when the Boston Bruins came back to tie the Rangers 3-3. The fans pelted him with garbage and booed him viciously. From there, however, the Rangers began to win and the fans began to cheer for him. At one point, the Rangers were in first place, but slumped later and finished fourth.

Terry Sawchuk got his 99th shutout when Toronto blanked Detroit 4–0 on February 25. He got his 100th career shutout on March 4, when Toronto defeated Chicago 4–0.

Bobby Hull scored his 50th goal of the season when Chicago lost to Toronto 9–5 on March 18 at Maple Leaf Gardens. Another superlative for the Black Hawks was Stan Mikita, who tied the league scoring record with 97 points in claiming the Art Ross Trophy for the third time. Mikita was also awarded the Hart Memorial Trophy as most valuable player.

The Chicago Black Hawks, who had won three Stanley Cups, finished first overall in the standings for the first time in their history, a full seventeen points ahead of the Montreal Canadiens and nineteen ahead of the Toronto Maple Leafs.

The Boston Bruins missed the playoffs, their last time before their record 29-season playoff streak.

=== Final standings ===
Pos	Team	Pld	W	L	T	GF	GA	GD	Pts
1	Chicago Black Hawks	70	41	17	12	264	170	+94	94
2	Montreal Canadiens	70	32	25	13	202	188	+14	77
3	Toronto Maple Leafs	70	32	27	11	204	211	−7	75
4	New York Rangers	70	30	28	12	188	189	−1	72
5	Detroit Red Wings	70	27	39	4	212	241	−29	58
6	Boston Bruins	70	17	43	10	182	253	−71	44

Source: National Hockey League

== Playoffs ==
=== Playoff bracket ===
The top four teams in the league qualified for the playoffs. In the semifinals, the first-place team played the third-place team, while the second-place team faced the fourth-place team, with the winners advancing to the Stanley Cup Finals. In both rounds, teams competed in a best-of-seven series (scores in the bracket indicate the number of games won in each best-of-seven series).

Semifinals
1	Chicago	2
3	Toronto	4
2	Montreal	4
4	New York	0

Stanley Cup Finals
3	Toronto	4
2	Montreal	2

=== Semifinals ===
==== (1) Chicago Black Hawks vs. (3) Toronto Maple Leafs ====
Despite Chicago's impressive regular season marks, it was the third seed Toronto Maple Leafs who beat the Black Hawks in the first round of the playoffs.

April 6	Toronto Maple Leafs	2–5	Chicago Black Hawks	Chicago Stadium	Recap
Frank Mahovlich (1) – pp – 07:12		First period	05:21 – pp – Kenny Wharram (1); 11:49 – Pierre Pilote (1)
No scoring		Second period	01:57 – pp – Bobby Hull (1); 13:44 – Stan Mikita (1)
Jim Pappin (1) – pp – 19:52		Third period	09:41 – Lou Angotti (1)
Terry Sawchuck 37 saves / 42 shots		Goalie stats	Denis DeJordy 42 saves / 44 shots

April 9	Toronto Maple Leafs	3–1	Chicago Black Hawks	Chicago Stadium	Recap
Pete Stemkowski (1) – 08:07; Dave Keon (1) – sh – 18:33		First period	No scoring
George Armstrong (1) – pp – 08:24		Second period	No scoring
No scoring		Third period	08:45 – Stan Mikita (2)
Terry Sawchuck 33 saves / 34 shots		Goalie stats	Denis DeJordy 22 saves / 25 shots

April 11	Chicago Black Hawks	1–3	Toronto Maple Leafs	Maple Leaf Gardens	Recap
No scoring		First period	11:10 – Ron Ellis (1)
No scoring		Second period	10:22 – pp – Frank Mahovlich (2); 19:15 – Jim Pappin (2)
Bobby Hull (2) – pp – 16:30		Third period	No scoring
Glenn Hall 33 saves / 36 shots		Goalie stats	Terry Sawchuck 35 saves / 36 shots

April 13	Chicago Black Hawks	4–3	Toronto Maple Leafs	Maple Leaf Gardens	Recap
Kenny Wharram (2) – 00:09; Pierre Pilote (2) – 08:32		First period	03:42 – Dave Keon (2); 10:14 – pp – Tim Horton (1)
No scoring		Second period	No scoring
Mike Walton (1) – 17:37		Third period	02:31 – Eric Nesterenko (1); 08:42 – Bobby Hull (3)
Denis DeJordy 2 saves / 3 shots Glenn Hall 28 saves / 30 shots		Goalie stats	Terry Sawchuck 22 saves / 26 shots

April 15	Toronto Maple Leafs	4–2	Chicago Black Hawks	Chicago Stadium	Recap
Mike Walton (2) – pp – 06:16; Frank Mahovlich (3) – pp – 14:14		First period	09:31 – Lou Angotti (2); 11:01 – Bobby Hull (4)
No scoring		Second period	No scoring
Pete Stemkowski (2) – 02:11; Jim Pappin (3) – 17:14		Third period	No scoring
Johnny Bower 10 saves / 12 shots Terry Sawchuck 37 saves / 37 shots		Goalie stats	Denis DeJordy 27 saves / 31 shots

April 18	Chicago Black Hawks	1–3	Toronto Maple Leafs	Maple Leaf Gardens	Recap
Pat Stapleton (1) – sh – 14:38		First period	05:06 – Brian Conacher (1)
No scoring		Second period	No scoring
No scoring		Third period	04:47 – Brian Conacher (2); 13:06 – Pete Stemkowski (3)
Glenn Hall 34 saves / 37 shots		Goalie stats	Terry Sawchuck 34 saves / 35 shots

Toronto won series 4–2

==== (2) Montreal Canadiens vs. (4) New York Rangers ====
Montreal swept the Rangers in four games.

April 6	New York Rangers	4–6	Montreal Canadiens	Montreal Forum	Recap
No scoring		First period	No scoring
Bernie Geoffrion (1) – pp – 03:46; Rod Gilbert (1) – pp – 16:06		Second period	09:34 – Ralph Backstrom (1)
Rod Gilbert (2) – pp – 01:49; Vic Hadfield (1) – 05:18		Third period	09:12 – Claude Provost (1); 09:34 – J.C. Tremblay (1); 11:03 – John Ferguson (1); 14:55 – Ralph Backstrom (2); 18:07 – Jean Beliveau (1)
Eddie Giacomin 30 saves / 36 shots		Goalie stats	Rogie Vachon 22 saves / 26 shots

April 8	New York Rangers	1–3	Montreal Canadiens	Montreal Forum	Recap
No scoring		First period	08:55 – pp – Dick Duff (1)
Bernie Geoffrion (2) – pp – 12:03		Second period	No scoring
No scoring		Third period	07:46 – pp – John Ferguson (2); 13:25 – Ralph Backstrom (3)
Eddie Giacomin 28 saves / 31 shots		Goalie stats	Rogie Vachon 26 saves / 27 shots

April 11	Montreal Canadiens	3–2	New York Rangers	Madison Square Garden III	Recap
Claude Larose (1) – 00:13; Jean Beliveau (2) – 03:09		First period	15:51 – pp – Jim Neilson (1)
Bobby Rousseau (1) – pp – 02:05		Second period	04:34 – Earl Ingarfield (1)
No scoring		Third period	No scoring
Rogie Vachon 28 saves / 30 shots		Goalie stats	Eddie Giacomin 35 saves / 38 shots

April 13	Montreal Canadiens	2–1	OT	New York Rangers	Madison Square Garden III	Recap
J.C. Tremblay (2) – 10:46		First period		No scoring
No scoring		Second period		17:56 – pp – Phil Goyette (1)
No scoring		Third period		No scoring
John Ferguson (3) – 06:28		First overtime period		No scoring
Rogie Vachon 33 saves / 34 shots		Goalie stats		Eddie Giacomin 27 saves / 29 shots

Montreal won series 4–0

=== Stanley Cup Finals ===
April 20	Toronto Maple Leafs	2–6	Montreal Canadiens	Montreal Forum	Recap
Larry Hillman (1) – 06:40		First period	06:25 – pp – Yvan Cournoyer (1); 11:19 – Henri Richard (1)
Jim Pappin (4) – pp – 12:59		Second period	05:03 – pp – Yvan Cournoyer (2); 06:36 – Jean Beliveau (3)
No scoring		Third period	04:53 – Henri Richard (2); 08:21 – Henri Richard (3)
Terry Sawchuck 30 saves / 35 shots Johnny Bower 8 saves / 9 shots		Goalie stats	Rogie Vachon 24 saves / 26 shots

April 22	Toronto Maple Leafs	3–0	Montreal Canadiens	Montreal Forum	Recap
Pete Stemkowski (4) – pp – 12:14		First period	No scoring
Mike Walton (3) – pp – 09:12; Tim Horton (2) – 16:57		Second period	No scoring
No scoring		Third period	No scoring
Johnny Bower 31 saves / 31 shots		Goalie stats	Rogie Vachon 40 saves / 43 shots

April 25	Montreal Canadiens	2–3	2OT	Toronto Maple Leafs	Maple Leaf Gardens	Recap
Jean Beliveau (4) – pp – 02:27		First period		08:39 – pp – Pete Stemkowski (5)
John Ferguson (4) – 19:10		Second period		10:34 – Jim Pappin (5)
No scoring		Third period		No scoring
No scoring		Second overtime period		08:26 – Bob Pulford (1)
Rogie Vachon 51 saves / 54 shots		Goalie stats		Johnny Bower 61 saves / 63 shots

April 27	Montreal Canadiens	6–2	Toronto Maple Leafs	Maple Leaf Gardens	Recap
Ralph Backstrom (4) – 12:25; Jean Beliveau (5) – pp – 13:08		First period	No scoring
Henri Richard (4) – 02:26; Jean Beliveau (6) – 13:41; Ralph Backstrom (5) – 15:58		Second period	02:09 – pp – Mike Walton (4); 12:16 – Tim Horton (3)
Jim Roberts (1) – 15:17		Third period	No scoring
Rogie Vachon 35 saves / 37 shots		Goalie stats	Terry Sawchuk 34 saves / 40 shots

April 29	Toronto Maple Leafs	4–1	Montreal Canadiens	Montreal Forum	Recap
Jim Pappin (6) – pp – 15:06		First period	06:03 – Leon Rochefort (1)
Brian Conacher (3) – 03:07; Marcel Pronovost (1) – sh – 12:02; Dave Keon (3) – 19:27		Second period	No scoring
No scoring		Third period	No scoring
Terry Sawchuk 37 saves / 38 shots		Goalie stats	Rogie Vachon 15 saves / 19 shots Gump Worsley 10 saves / 10 shots

May 2	Montreal Canadiens	1–3	Toronto Maple Leafs	Maple Leaf Gardens	Recap
No scoring		First period	No scoring
No scoring		Second period	06:25 – Ron Ellis (2); 19:24 – Jim Pappin (7)
Dick Duff (2) – 05:28		Third period	19:13 – en – George Armstrong (2)
Gump Worsley 33 saves / 35 shots		Goalie stats	Terry Sawchuk 40 saves / 41 shots

Toronto won series 4–2

== Awards ==
1966–1967 NHL awards
Prince of Wales Trophy: (Regular season champion)	Chicago Black Hawks
Art Ross Trophy: (Top scorer)	Stan Mikita, Chicago Black Hawks
Calder Memorial Trophy: (Best first-year player)	Bobby Orr, Boston Bruins
Conn Smythe Trophy: (Most valuable player, playoffs)	Dave Keon, Toronto Maple Leafs
Hart Trophy: (Most valuable player, season)	Stan Mikita, Chicago Black Hawks
James Norris Memorial Trophy: (Best defenceman)	Harry Howell, New York Rangers
Lady Byng Memorial Trophy: (Excellence and sportsmanship)	Stan Mikita, Chicago Black Hawks
Vezina Trophy: (Goaltender(s) of team with the best goals-against average)	Glenn Hall and Denis DeJordy, Chicago Black Hawks

=== All-Star teams ===
Ed Giacomin, New York Rangers	G	Glenn Hall, Chicago Black Hawks
Pierre Pilote, Chicago Black Hawks	D	Tim Horton, Toronto Maple Leafs
Harry Howell, New York Rangers	D	Bobby Orr, Boston Bruins
Stan Mikita, Chicago Black Hawks	C	Norm Ullman, Detroit Red Wings
Kenny Wharram, Chicago Black Hawks	RW	Gordie Howe, Detroit Red Wings
Bobby Hull, Chicago Black Hawks	LW	Don Marshall, New York Rangers

== Player statistics ==
=== Scoring leaders ===
Note: GP = Games played; G = Goals; A = Assists; Pts = Points

Player	Team	GP	G	A	Pts	PIM
Stan Mikita	Chicago Black Hawks	70	35	62	97	12
Bobby Hull	Chicago Black Hawks	66	52	28	80	52
Norm Ullman	Detroit Red Wings	68	26	44	70	26
Ken Wharram	Chicago Black Hawks	70	31	34	65	21
Gordie Howe	Detroit Red Wings	69	25	40	65	53
Bobby Rousseau	Montreal Canadiens	68	19	44	63	58
Phil Esposito	Chicago Black Hawks	69	21	40	61	40
Phil Goyette	New York Rangers	70	12	49	61	6
Doug Mohns	Chicago Black Hawks	61	25	35	60	58
Henri Richard	Montreal Canadiens	65	21	34	55	28
Alex Delvecchio	Detroit Red Wings	70	17	38	55	10

Source: NHL.

=== Leading goaltenders ===
Note: GP = Games played; Min = Minutes played; GA = Goals against; GAA = Goals against average; W = Wins; L = Losses; T = Ties; SO = Shutouts

Player	Team	GP	MIN	GA	GAA	W	L	T	SO
Glenn Hall	Chicago Black Hawks	32	1664	66	2.38	19	5	5	2
Denis DeJordy	Chicago Black Hawks	44	2536	104	2.46	22	12	7	4
Charlie Hodge	Montreal Canadiens	37	2055	88	2.60	11	15	7	3
Eddie Giacomin	New York Rangers	68	3981	173	2.61	30	27	11	9
Johnny Bower	Toronto Maple Leafs	27	1431	63	2.64	12	9	3	2
Terry Sawchuk	Toronto Maple Leafs	28	1409	66	2.81	15	5	4	2
Roger Crozier	Detroit Red Wings	58	3256	182	3.35	22	29	4	4
Eddie Johnston	Boston Bruins	34	1880	116	3.70	8	21	2	0

== Coaches ==
- Boston Bruins: Harry Sinden
- Chicago Black Hawks: Billy Reay
- Detroit Red Wings: Sid Abel
- Montreal Canadiens: Toe Blake
- New York Rangers: Emile Francis
- Toronto Maple Leafs: Punch Imlach

== Debuts ==
The following is a list of players of note who played their first NHL game in 1966–67 (listed with their first team, asterisk(*) marks debut in playoffs):

- Bobby Orr, Boston Bruins
- Glen Sather, Boston Bruins
- Ed Van Impe, Chicago Black Hawks
- Carol Vadnais, Montreal Canadiens
- Serge Savard, Montreal Canadiens
- Rogie Vachon, Montreal Canadiens

== Last games ==
The following is a list of players of note that played their last game in the NHL in 1966–67 (listed with their last team):

- Bill Hay, Chicago Black Hawks
- Red Kelly, Toronto Maple Leafs

== Broadcasting ==
Hockey Night in Canada on CBC Television televised Saturday night regular season games and Stanley Cup playoff games. HNIC also produced Wednesday night regular season game telecasts for CTV. Games were typically not broadcast in their entirety until the 1968–69 season, and were typically joined in progress.

This was the first season under a new U.S. rights agreement with CBS. Due to prior programming commitments for this season only, CBS sub-licensed its Sunday afternoon regular season games to RKO General. CBS still aired selected playoff games.

== See also ==
- 1966–67 NHL transactions
- 1967 NHL Expansion
- List of Stanley Cup champions
- 1966 NHL amateur draft
- 20th National Hockey League All-Star Game
- National Hockey League All-Star Game
- Lester Patrick Trophy
- 1966 in sports
- 1967 in sports
