= Ralph Backstrom =

Canadian ice hockey player (1937–2021)

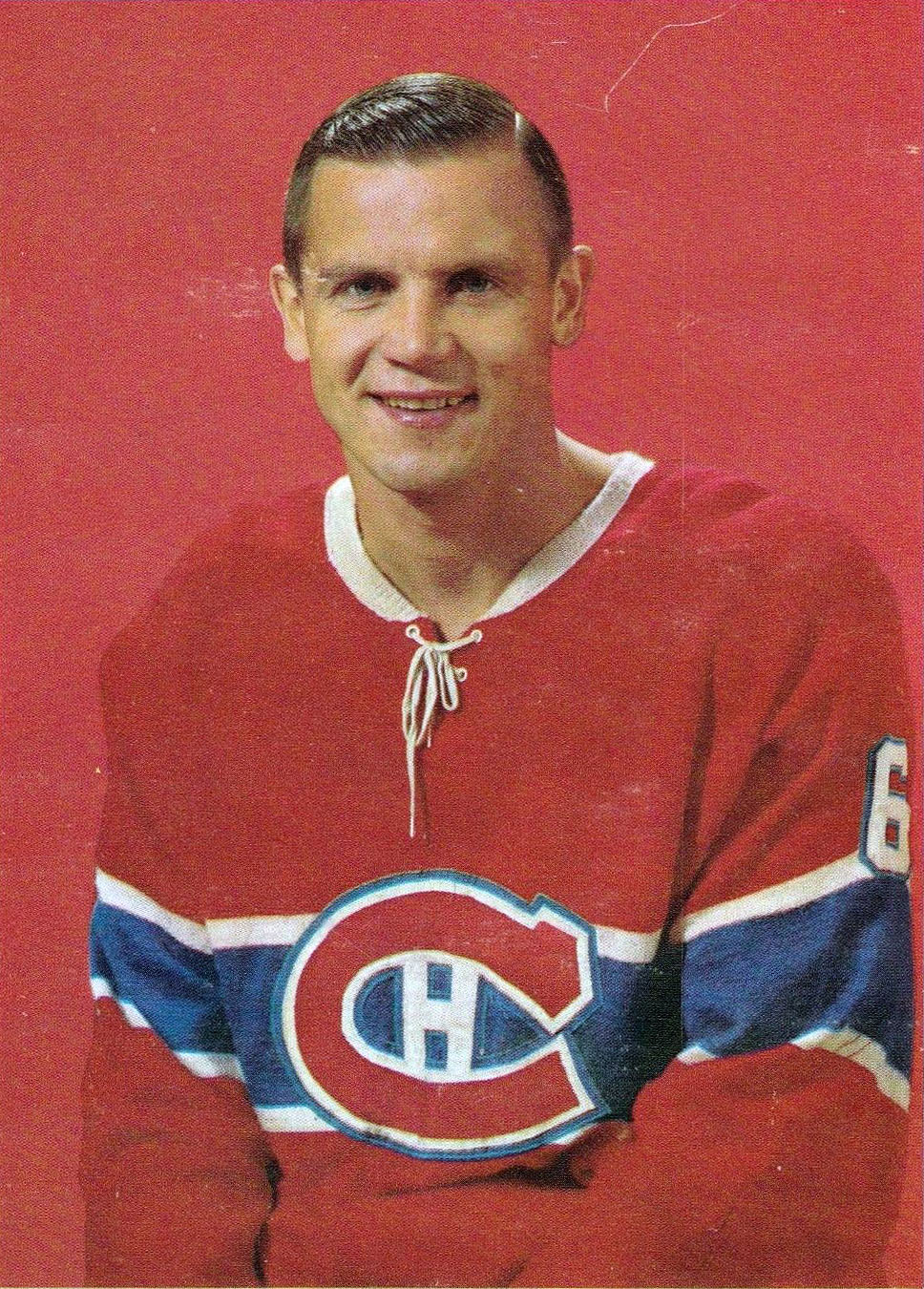
- Backstrom with the Montreal Canadiens in the 1960s
- Born: September 18, 1937 Kirkland Lake, Ontario, Canada
- Died: February 7, 2021 (aged 83) Windsor, Colorado, U.S.
- Height: 5 ft 10 in (178 cm)
- Weight: 165 lb (75 kg; 11 st 11 lb)
- Position: Centre
- Shot: Left
- Played for: Montreal Canadiens; Los Angeles Kings; Chicago Black Hawks; Chicago Cougars; Denver Spurs; Ottawa Civics; New England Whalers
- National team: Canada
- Playing career: 1956–1977

Ralph Gerald Backstrom (September 18, 1937 – February 7, 2021) was a Canadian professional ice hockey centre and later a coach, entrepreneur and hockey executive. He played in the National Hockey League (NHL) with the Montreal Canadiens, Los Angeles Kings, and Chicago Black Hawks between 1956 and 1973. He also played in the World Hockey Association with the Chicago Cougars, Denver Spurs/Ottawa Civics, and New England Whalers from 1973 to 1977. With the Canadiens, he won the Stanley Cup six times, and won the Calder Memorial Trophy as the NHL's rookie of the year in 1959. After retiring he served as head coach of the University of Denver Pioneers for several years in the 1980s.

== Playing career ==
Backstrom played junior hockey from 1954 to 1958, with the Montreal Junior Canadiens, which relocated and was renamed the Ottawa-Hull Canadiens in 1956. He was captain of the team that won the George Richardson Memorial Trophy in 1957 and the Memorial Cup in 1958.

As a professional, Backstrom joined the Montreal Canadiens for the 1958–59 season and was selected the NHL's top rookie, receiving the Calder Memorial Trophy. He played in Montreal for 12 full seasons, winning six Stanley Cups and appearing in six National Hockey League All-Star Games (1958, 1959, 1960, 1962, 1965, 1967). After the 1969–70 season, Backstrom requested a trade and talked about retiring. He reported to training camp, but left the team just before the season opened. After returning to the Canadiens, Backstrom spent most of his time on the bench until being traded to the Los Angeles Kings in January 1971. With Los Angeles he scored 14 goals in 33 games, enabling the Kings to avoid last place by finishing ahead of the California Golden Seals. Since the Seals' first draft pick had been traded to the Canadiens, this enabled the Canadiens to draft first and acquire superstar Guy Lafleur as a reward for sending Backstrom to the Kings. Just over two years later, he was traded to the Chicago Black Hawks for Dan Maloney and finished the 1972–73 season there.

Backstrom then jumped to the World Hockey Association and joined the Chicago Cougars, where he played for two years, and later became a part-owner of the team. In his first season, he led the Cougars in scoring with 33 goals and 83 points in 70 games. The team finished 4th in the Eastern Division but in the 1974 WHA playoffs, the Cougars came alive and advanced to the Avco Cup Finals, where they lost to the Houston Aeros in four games. Backstrom tied three other players for most points in the postseason with 14 while having five goals to finish 2nd among all skaters in points with 19. He also represented Canada at the 1974 Summit Series on an all-star team of Canadian WHA players. His offensive production dropped sharply in 1974–75 and at the end of the season the new Denver Spurs selected Backstrom in the WHA's expansion draft. Backstrom was the team's top scorer, but the franchise struggled, and a move to Ottawa—where the team was renamed the Ottawa Civics—did not help. The franchise ceased operations 41 games into the season. Backstrom finished the season with the New England Whalers, scoring 35 goals and 83 points over the year. He played one more year with New England and retired in 1977. He would have turned 40 before the start of the next season. Through his professional career, Backstrom had seven 20-goal seasons in the NHL and two 30-goal seasons in the WHA.

== Coaching ==
Immediately after his retirement Backstrom accepted an offer to join the staff of newly appointed University of Denver head coach Marshall Johnston as an assistant. Three years later Backstrom returned to the NHL as an assistant for the Los Angeles Kings but only stayed for one season before rejoining Denver, this time as the bench boss after Johnston left to join the NHL's Colorado Rockies. Backstrom led the Pioneers through a few lean years in the early 1980s before having a breakout season in 1985–86 when he led Denver to a team record 34-win season, including a conference regular season title, a conference tournament title (their first in 13 years) and reached the team's first Frozen Four since finishing second in 1973. Backstrom earned the Spencer Penrose Award, as national coach of the year, for the impressive season. However, the team was unable to sustain the high level of play for the remainder of his tenure. Backstrom resigned after the 1989–90 season, turning the team over to Frank Serratore.

Backstrom jumped into the professional ranks in 1990–91 when he took over the Phoenix Roadrunners. After a good first season, including pushing the number-one seeded Peoria Rivermen to a seventh game in the Turner Cup semifinals, Phoenix dropped to dead last in the 10-team league. Backstrom subsequently resigned as coach.

== Front office ==
Backstrom, along with Dennis Murphy and Larry King, founded Roller Hockey International and served as commissioner for a time. It soon became apparent that the league was in financial trouble and it suspended the entire 1998 season before playing one final campaign in 1999. While the league did not officially disband until 2001, Backstrom returned to the NHL in 1999–00 as a scout for the St. Louis Blues.

After three seasons with the Blues, Backstrom founded a new CHL team called the Colorado Eagles in 2002. He owned the team, was general manager and president for the first three seasons, including a CHL championship in 2004–05. His Eagles finished atop their division six times, made the finals five times, and won the Ray Miron President's Cup twice in eight seasons before moving to the ECHL in 2011–12. Later moving to the AHL in 2018-19

== Awards and achievements ==
- Memorial Cup champion — 1958
- Calder Memorial Trophy — 1959
- NHL All-Star Games — 1958, 1959, 1960, 1962, 1965, 1967
- Stanley Cup champion — 1959, 1960, 1965, 1966, 1968, 1969 (with Montreal)
- Paul Deneau Trophy — 1974

== Personal life ==
Backstrom's parents were both born near Vaasa in Finland, and met in Kirkland Lake, Ontario. He was a cousin of NHL player Daren Puppa. He was not related to goalie Niklas Bäckström, nor centre Nicklas Bäckström.

Backstrom married his first wife, Frances Richard, in April 1961. He married his second wife, Janet, in 1985. They remained married until his death. He had three children from his first wife: Martin, Diana, Andrew. He later had a fourth child, Kevin Martin, who was given up for adoption at birth.

Backstrom died after a long illness on February 7, 2021, aged 83, in his Windsor, Colorado, home. Backstrom's brain was donated for study to researchers at Boston University and it was found that Backstrom had been suffering from stage 3 chronic traumatic encephalopathy at the time of his death.

== Career statistics ==
=== Regular season and playoffs ===
			Regular season					Playoffs
Season	Team	League	GP	G	A	Pts	PIM	GP	G	A	Pts	PIM
1954–55	Montreal Jr. Canadiens	QJHL	21	7	6	13	2	5	2	1	3	4
1955–56	Montreal Jr. Canadiens	QJHL	18	10	8	18	4	—	—	—	—	—
1955–56	Montreal Jr. Canadiens	M-Cup	—	—	—	—	—	10	5	4	9	6
1956–57	Ottawa-Hull Canadiens	OHA-Jr.	18	10	8	18	4	—	—	—	—	—
1956–57	Ottawa-Hull Canadiens	EOHL	18	7	10	17	4	—	—	—	—	—
1956–57	Montreal Canadiens	NHL	3	0	0	0	0	—	—	—	—	—
1956–57	Ottawa-Hull Canadiens	M-Cup	—	—	—	—	—	15	17	11	28	19
1957–58	Rochester Americans	AHL	2	0	0	0	0	—	—	—	—	—
1957–58	Ottawa-Hull Canadiens	OHA-Jr.	26	24	27	51	64	—	—	—	—	—
1957–58	Ottawa-Hull Canadiens	EOHL	33	21	25	46	13	—	—	—	—	—
1957–58	Montreal Royals	QHL	1	0	1	1	0	—	—	—	—	—
1957–58	Ottawa-Hull Canadiens	M-Cup	—	—	—	—	—	13	17	9	26	24
1958–59	Montreal Canadiens	NHL	64	18	22	40	19	11	3	5	8	12
1959–60	Montreal Canadiens	NHL	64	13	15	28	24	7	0	3	3	2
1960–61	Montreal Canadiens	NHL	69	12	20	32	44	5	0	0	0	4
1961–62	Montreal Canadiens	NHL	66	27	38	65	29	5	0	1	1	6
1962–63	Montreal Canadiens	NHL	70	23	12	35	51	5	0	0	0	2
1963–64	Montreal Canadiens	NHL	70	8	21	29	41	7	2	1	3	8
1964–65	Montreal Canadiens	NHL	70	25	30	55	41	13	2	3	5	10
1965–66	Montreal Canadiens	NHL	67	22	20	42	10	10	3	4	7	4
1966–67	Montreal Canadiens	NHL	69	14	27	41	39	10	5	2	7	6
1967–68	Montreal Canadiens	NHL	70	20	25	45	14	13	4	3	7	4
1968–69	Montreal Canadiens	NHL	72	13	28	41	16	14	3	4	7	10
1969–70	Montreal Canadiens	NHL	72	19	24	43	20	—	—	—	—	—
1970–71	Montreal Canadiens	NHL	16	1	4	5	0	—	—	—	—	—
1970–71	Los Angeles Kings	NHL	33	14	13	27	8	—	—	—	—	—
1971–72	Los Angeles Kings	NHL	76	23	29	52	22	—	—	—	—	—
1972–73	Los Angeles Kings	NHL	63	20	29	49	6	—	—	—	—	—
1972–73	Chicago Black Hawks	NHL	16	6	3	9	2	16	5	6	11	0
1973–74	Chicago Cougars	WHA	78	33	50	83	26	18	5	14	19	4
1974–75	Chicago Cougars	WHA	70	15	24	39	28	—	—	—	—	—
1975–76	Denver Spurs/Ottawa Civics	WHA	41	21	29	50	14	—	—	—	—	—
1975–76	New England Whalers	WHA	38	14	19	33	6	17	5	4	9	8
1976–77	New England Whalers	WHA	77	17	31	48	30	3	0	0	0	0
NHL totals			1,032	278	361	639	386	116	27	32	59	68
WHA totals			234	85	129	214	76	38	10	18	28	12

=== International ===
Year	Team	Event	GP	G	A	Pts	PIM
1974	Canada	SS-74	8	4	4	8	10
Senior totals			8	4	4	8	10

== Head coaching record ==
Record table
Season	Team	Overall	Conference	Standing	Postseason
Denver Pioneers (WCHA) (1981–1990)
1981–82	Denver	21–19–3	9–15–2	4th	WCHA Semifinals
1982–83	Denver	15–22–0	11–15–0	5th	WCHA Quarterfinals
1983–84	Denver	14–25–0	8–18–0	5th	WCHA Quarterfinals
1984–85	Denver	19–17–3	16–15–3	2nd	WCHA Quarterfinals
1985–86	Denver	34–13–1	25–9–0	1st	NCAA Consolation Game (Loss)
1986–87	Denver	19–18–3	16–16–3	3rd	WCHA Quarterfinals
1987–88	Denver	20–17–2	19–14–2	3rd	WCHA Quarterfinals
1988–89	Denver	22–19–2	16–17–2	5th	WCHA Runner-Up
1989–90	Denver	18–24–0	13–15–0	5th	WCHA Quarterfinals
Denver:		182–174–14	133–134–12		
Total:		182–174–14			
National champion Postseason invitational champion Conference regular season champion Conference regular season and conference tournament champion Division regular season champion Division regular season and conference tournament champion Conference tournament champion

== See also ==
- List of NHL players with 1,000 games played

Awards and achievements
Preceded by Frank Mahovlich	Winner of the Calder Memorial Trophy; 1959	Succeeded by Bill Hay
Preceded by Mike Sertich	WCHA Coach of the Year; 1985–86	Succeeded by John Gasparini
Preceded by Len Ceglarski	Spencer Penrose Award; 1985–86	Succeeded by John Gasparini
