= Serge Savard =

Canadian ice hockey player (born 1946)

Serge Savard OC CQ
- Hockey Hall of Fame, 1986
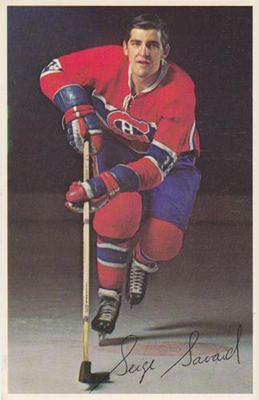
- Savard with the Montreal Canadiens in 1970
- Born: January 22, 1946 (age 80) Montreal, Quebec, Canada
- Height: 6 ft 3 in (191 cm)
- Weight: 210 lb (95 kg; 15 st 0 lb)
- Position: Defence
- Shot: Left
- Played for: Montreal Canadiens; Winnipeg Jets
- National team: Canada
- Playing career: 1966–1983

Serge Aubrey Savard OC CQ (born January 22, 1946) is a Canadian former professional ice hockey defenceman, most famously with the Montreal Canadiens of the National Hockey League (NHL). He also served as the Canadiens' senior vice president of hockey operations and as their general manager. He is a businessman in Montreal, and is nicknamed "The Senator." In 2017 Savard was named one of the 100 Greatest NHL Players in history.

== Playing career ==
Savard played minor league hockey with the Montreal Junior Canadiens and the Omaha Knights.

He made his NHL debut with the Montreal Canadiens in 1966-67. In 1968–69, his second full NHL season, he won the Conn Smythe Trophy as the playoffs' most valuable player, the first defenceman to do so. His early playing career was marked by two broken legs, in 1970 and 1971. In fifteen seasons with the Canadiens, Savard played on seven Stanley Cup championship teams: 1967-68, 1968-69, 1972-73, 1975-76, 1976-77, 1977-78, and 1978-79, the most by any defenceman (the Canadiens won the Stanley Cup in 1970-71 but Savard did not play in the playoffs because of a broken leg, his second in two years). In 1978–79, he won the Bill Masterton Memorial Trophy for perseverance and dedication to the game.

Savard played the last two seasons of his career with the Winnipeg Jets before retiring in 1983. He was the second last active player of the Original Six era. (Wayne Cashman was the last, as he and the Boston Bruins advanced further in the playoffs that year than the Jets did.)

Savard was known for the "Savardian Spin-o-rama", a quick pivoting turn with the puck done in order to evade opponents; the term was coined by sportscaster Danny Gallivan. (Note: It was not named after Denis Savard, who was adept at the same manoeuvre, as many have thought.) Savard has said that it was Doug Harvey, a Montreal defenseman whom Savard idolized, who created the move which inspired him.

Savard played for Team Canada in the 1972 Summit Series against the Soviet Union. He was in the starting lineup for games 2 and 3 in Toronto and Winnipeg. He suffered a hairline fracture in his leg which forced him to sit out games 4 and 5. He returned to the lineup for the last three games, and was the only Canadian player to play in the 4 wins, and 1 tie game, without having played in a game they lost.

== Post-playing career ==
After Savard retired as a player, he was named the general manager of the Canadiens, and served as the general manager of the Sherbrooke Canadiens of the American Hockey League. Savard won the Calder Cup with Sherbrooke in 1985. He was the general manager of the Montreal Canadiens when they won the Stanley Cup in 1985-86 and 1992-93. Savard was dismissed after a poor start to the 1995-96 season, after the Canadiens missed the playoffs in 1994-95.

In 1994 he was made an Officer of the Order of Canada. In 2004, he was made a Knight of the National Order of Quebec. He is currently the chairman of the annual Canada Day festivities in Montreal. He lived a few years in Saint-Bruno-de-Montarville, Quebec. His son Marc ran unsuccessfully in the 2004 Canadian federal election for the Liberal Party in the riding of Saint-Bruno-Saint-Hubert .

In 1998, he was ranked number 81 on The Hockey News' list of the 100 Greatest Hockey Players.

Since 1993, Savard has been a partner in a firm of real-estate developers, Thibault, Messier, Savard & Associates, based in Montreal.

In September 2004, Savard was arrested in Montreal under suspicion of drunk driving. He pleaded not guilty in November 2004, but changed his plea to guilty in May 2006.

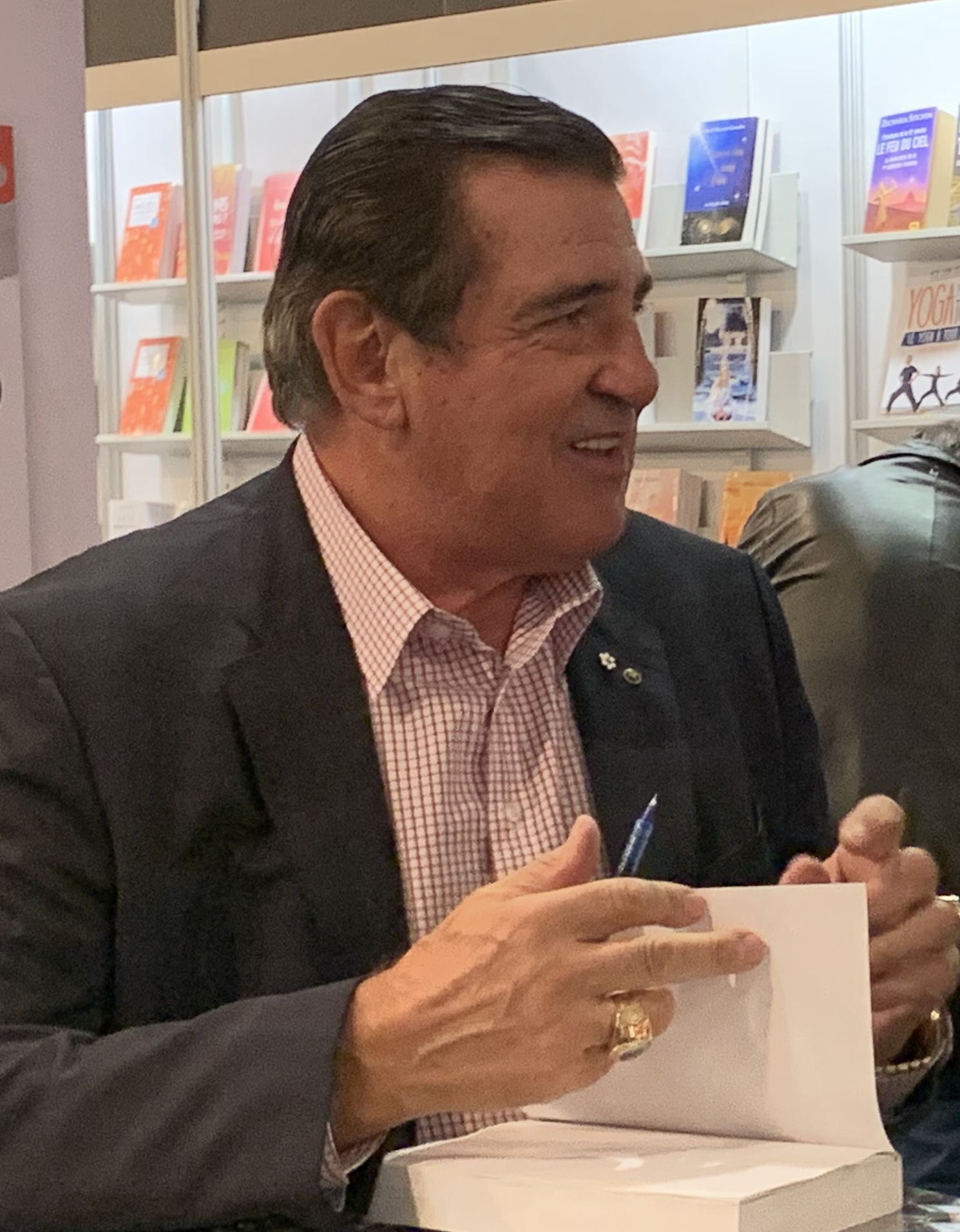
Savard in 2019

On November 18, 2006, the Montreal Canadiens retired his jersey number 18 in a ceremony at the Bell Centre.

In April 2012 after the dismissal of Pierre Gauthier, Montreal Canadiens owner Geoff Molson called upon Savard to assist and advise him in the team's search for a new general manager.

Savard was part-owner in a resort called El Senador located in Cayo Coco, Cuba until it was sold in 2005. The name was a Spanish translation of his nickname.

Savard has been a longtime fan of harness racing. He has co-owned many successful horses, including Canadian Horse Racing Hall of Fame inductee Shadow Play and Meadowlands Pace champion Lawless Shadow.

== Awards ==
- Won Stanley Cup — seven as a player (1968, 1969, 1973, 1976, 1977, 1978, and 1979), and two as general manager (1986, and 1993), all with the Montreal Canadiens
- Won Conn Smythe Trophy — 1969
- Named an NHL Second-Team All-Star — 1979
- Played in 4 NHL All-Star Games — 1970, 1973, 1977, 1978
- Won Bill Masterton Memorial Trophy — 1979
- Inducted into the Hockey Hall of Fame — 1986
- In 1998, he was ranked number 81 on The Hockey News' list of the 100 Greatest Hockey Players.

== Career statistics ==
=== Regular season and playoffs ===
			Regular season					Playoffs
Season	Team	League	GP	G	A	Pts	PIM	GP	G	A	Pts	PIM
1963–64	Montreal Junior Canadiens	OHA-Jr.	56	3	31	34	72	17	1	7	8	30
1965–65	Montreal Junior Canadiens	OHA-Jr.	56	14	33	47	81	7	2	3	5	8
1964–65	Omaha Knights	CPHL	2	0	0	0	0	4	0	1	1	4
1965–66	Montreal Junior Canadiens	OHA-Jr.	20	8	10	18	33	10	1	4	5	20
1966–67	Montreal Canadiens	NHL	2	0	0	0	0	—	—	—	—	—
1966–67	Houston Apollos	CPHL	68	7	25	32	155	5	1	3	4	17
1966–67	Quebec Aces	AHL	—	—	—	—	—	1	0	0	0	2
1967–68	Montreal Canadiens	NHL	67	2	13	15	34	6	2	0	2	0
1968–69	Montreal Canadiens	NHL	74	8	23	31	73	14	4	6	10	24
1969–70	Montreal Canadiens	NHL	64	12	19	31	38	—	—	—	—	—
1970–71	Montreal Canadiens	NHL	37	5	10	15	30	—	—	—	—	—
1971–72	Montreal Canadiens	NHL	23	1	8	9	16	6	0	0	0	10
1972–73	Montreal Canadiens	NHL	74	7	32	39	58	17	3	8	11	22
1973–74	Montreal Canadiens	NHL	67	4	14	18	49	6	1	1	2	4
1974–75	Montreal Canadiens	NHL	80	20	40	60	64	11	1	7	8	2
1975–76	Montreal Canadiens	NHL	71	8	39	47	38	13	3	6	9	6
1976–77	Montreal Canadiens	NHL	78	9	33	42	35	14	2	7	9	2
1977–78	Montreal Canadiens	NHL	77	8	34	42	24	15	1	7	8	8
1978–79	Montreal Canadiens	NHL	80	7	26	33	30	16	2	7	9	6
1979–80	Montreal Canadiens	NHL	46	5	8	13	18	2	0	0	0	0
1980–81	Montreal Canadiens	NHL	77	4	13	17	30	3	0	0	0	0
1981–82	Winnipeg Jets	NHL	47	2	5	7	26	5	0	0	0	2
1982–83	Winnipeg Jets	NHL	76	4	16	20	29	3	0	0	0	2
NHL totals			1,040	106	333	439	592	130	19	49	68	88

=== International ===
Year	Team	Event	GP	G	A	Pts	PIM
1972	Canada	SS	5	0	2	2	0
1976	Canada	CC	7	0	3	3	0
Senior totals			12	0	5	5	0

== See also ==
- Captain
- List of NHL players with 1,000 games played

== Notes ==
Preceded by Yvan Cournoyer	Montreal Canadiens captain 1979–81	Succeeded by Bob Gainey
Preceded by Glenn Hall	Winner of the Conn Smythe Trophy; 1969	Succeeded by Bobby Orr
Preceded by Irving Grundman	General Manager of the Montreal Canadiens; 1983–95	Succeeded by Rejean Houle
