= Eddy Palchak =

Canadian ice hockey trainer (1940–2011)

Edward "Eddy" Palchak (May 18, 1940 – November 16, 2011) was a Canadian ice hockey trainer and equipment manager with the Montreal Canadiens. He was with the club for 31 years. He served on 10 Stanley Cup winners with Montreal, the most by any Trainer.

In 1998, he was inducted into the Hockey Hall of Fame in the Professional Hockey Athletic Trainers Society wing. After his retirement Palchak wrote Ask Eddy, a column in the Canadiens magazine. To commemorate the 100th anniversary of the club in 2009, the Canadiens invited all-time greats to step on the ice of the Bell Centre in full gear while Stanley Cup winning coaches stood behind the bench. Palchak was also invited to reprise his role and emptied buckets of pucks on the ice for warmup. He died in 2011 in Montreal.
