= 1967 Stanley Cup playoffs =

NHL postseason tournament

Tournament details
- Dates: April 6 – May 2, 1967
- Teams: 4
- Defending champions: Montreal Canadiens

Final positions
- Champions: Toronto Maple Leafs
- Runners-up: Montreal Canadiens

Tournament statistics
- Scoring leader(s): Jim Pappin (Maple Leafs) (15 points)

Awards
- MVP: Dave Keon (Maple Leafs)

The 1967 Stanley Cup playoffs was the playoff tournament of the National Hockey League (NHL) for the 1966–67 season, and the final postseason before the expansion from six to twelve teams. The Toronto Maple Leafs defeated the defending champions the Montreal Canadiens, in six games to win the Stanley Cup. The Leafs squad was the oldest ever to win a Cup final; the average age of the team was well more than 30, and four players were more than 40. Toronto has not won the Cup or been to the Finals since.

== Playoff seeds ==
The top four out of the six teams in the league qualified for the playoffs:

1. Chicago Black Hawks – 94 points
2. Montreal Canadiens – 77 points
3. Toronto Maple Leafs – 75 points
4. New York Rangers – 72 points

== Playoff bracket ==
In each round, teams competed in a best-of-seven series (scores in the bracket indicate the number of games won in each best-of-seven series). In the semifinals, the first-place team played the third-place team, while the second-place team played the fourth-place team. The winners of the semifinals then played for the Stanley Cup.

Semifinals
1	Chicago	2
3	Toronto	4
2	Montreal	4
4	New York	0

Finals
3	Toronto	4
2	Montreal	2

== Semifinals ==
=== (1) Chicago Black Hawks vs. (3) Toronto Maple Leafs ===
The Chicago Black Hawks was the best regular season team with 94 points. The Toronto Maple Leafs earned the third seed with 75 points. This was the sixth playoff series between these two teams, with Toronto winning three of their five previous series. Their most recent series had come in the 1962 Stanley Cup Finals, which Toronto won in six games. Chicago earned eighteen of twenty-eight points in this year's regular season series.

Despite Chicago's impressive regular season marks, the third seed Toronto Maple Leafs beat the Black Hawks in the first round of the playoffs.

April 6	Toronto Maple Leafs	2–5	Chicago Black Hawks	Chicago Stadium	Recap
Frank Mahovlich (1) - pp - 7:12		First period	5:21 - pp - Kenny Wharram (1); 11:49 - Pierre Pilote (1)
No scoring		Second period	1:57 - pp - Bobby Hull (1); 13:44 - Stan Mikita (1)
Jim Pappin (1) - pp - 19:52		Third period	9:41 - Lou Angotti (1)
Terry Sawchuk 37 saves / 42 shots		Goalie stats	Denis DeJordy 42 saves / 44 shots

April 9	Toronto Maple Leafs	3–1	Chicago Black Hawks	Chicago Stadium	Recap
Pete Stemkowski (1) - 8:07; Dave Keon (1) - sh - 18:33		First period	No scoring
George Armstrong (1) - pp - 8:24		Second period	No scoring
No scoring		Third period	8:45 - Stan Mikita (2)
Terry Sawchuk 33 saves / 34 shots		Goalie stats	Denis DeJordy 22 saves / 25 shots

April 11	Chicago Black Hawks	1–3	Toronto Maple Leafs	Maple Leaf Gardens	Recap
No scoring		First period	11:10 - Ron Ellis (1)
No scoring		Second period	10:22 - pp - Frank Mahovlich (2); 19:15 - Jim Pappin (2)
Bobby Hull (2) - pp - 16:30		Third period	No scoring
Glenn Hall 33 saves / 36 shots		Goalie stats	Terry Sawchuk 35 saves / 36 shots

April 13	Chicago Black Hawks	4–3	Toronto Maple Leafs	Maple Leaf Gardens	Recap
Kenny Wharram (2) - 00:09; Pierre Pilote (2) - 8:32		First period	3:42 - Dave Keon (2); 10:14 - pp - Tim Horton (1)
No scoring		Second period	No scoring
Mike Walton (1) - 17:37		Third period	2:31 - Eric Nesterenko (1); 8:42 - Bobby Hull (3)
Denis DeJordy 2 saves / 3 shots Glenn Hall 28 saves / 30 shots		Goalie stats	Terry Sawchuk 22 saves / 26 shots

April 15	Toronto Maple Leafs	4–2	Chicago Black Hawks	Chicago Stadium	Recap
Mike Walton (2) - pp - 6:16; Frank Mahovlich (3) - pp - 14:14		First period	9:31 - Lou Angotti (2); 11:01 - Bobby Hull (4)
No scoring		Second period	No scoring
Pete Stemkowski (2) - 2:11; Jim Pappin (3) - 17:14		Third period	No scoring
Johnny Bower 10 saves / 12 shots Terry Sawchuk 37 saves / 37 shots		Goalie stats	Denis DeJordy 27 saves / 31 shots

April 18	Chicago Black Hawks	1–3	Toronto Maple Leafs	Maple Leaf Gardens	Recap
Pat Stapleton (1) - sh - 14:38		First period	5:06 - Brian Conacher (1)
No scoring		Second period	No scoring
No scoring		Third period	4:47 - Brian Conacher (2); 13:06 - Pete Stemkowski (3)
Glenn Hall 34 saves / 37 shots		Goalie stats	Terry Sawchuk 34 saves / 35 shots

Toronto won series 4–2

=== (2) Montreal Canadiens vs. (4) New York Rangers ===
Montreal earned the second seed with 77 points. New York earned the fourth seed with 72 points. This was the eighth playoff series between these two teams, with New York winning four of their seven previous series. Their most recent series had come in the 1957 semifinals, where Montreal defeated New York in five games. Montreal earned sixteen out of twenty-eight points in this year's regular season series.

Montreal defeated the Rangers in a four-game sweep.

April 6	New York Rangers	4–6	Montreal Canadiens	Forum de Montréal	Recap
No scoring		First period	No scoring
Bernie Geoffrion (1) - pp - 3:46; Rod Gilbert (1) - pp - 16:06		Second period	9:34 - Ralph Backstrom (1)
Rod Gilbert (2) - pp - 1:49; Vic Hadfield (1) - 5:18		Third period	9:12 - Claude Provost (1); 9:34 - J.C. Tremblay (1); 11:03 - John Ferguson (1); 14:55 - Ralph Backstrom (2); 18:07 - Jean Beliveau (1)
Eddie Giacomin 30 saves / 36 shots		Goalie stats	Rogie Vachon 22 saves / 26 shots

April 8	New York Rangers	1–3	Montreal Canadiens	Forum de Montréal	Recap
No scoring		First period	8:55 - pp - Dick Duff (1)
Bernie Geoffrion (2) - pp - 12:03		Second period	No scoring
No scoring		Third period	7:46 - pp - John Ferguson (2); 13:25 - Ralph Backstrom (3)
Eddie Giacomin 28 saves / 31 shots		Goalie stats	Rogie Vachon 26 saves / 27 shots

April 11	Montreal Canadiens	3–2	New York Rangers	Madison Square Garden III	Recap
Claude Larose (1) - 00:13; Jean Beliveau (2) - 3:09		First period	15:51 - pp - Jim Neilson (1)
Bobby Rousseau (1) - pp - 2:05		Second period	4:34 - Earl Ingarfield (1)
No scoring		Third period	No scoring
Rogie Vachon 28 saves / 30 shots		Goalie stats	Eddie Giacomin 35 saves / 38 shots

April 13	Montreal Canadiens	2–1	OT	New York Rangers	Madison Square Garden III	Recap
J.C. Tremblay (2) - 10:46		First period		No scoring
No scoring		Second period		17:56 - pp - Phil Goyette (1)
No scoring		Third period		No scoring
John Ferguson (3) - 6:28		First overtime period		No scoring
Rogie Vachon 33 saves / 34 shots		Goalie stats		Eddie Giacomin 27 saves / 29 shots

Montreal won series 4–0

== Finals ==
The Montreal Canadiens were the two-time defending Stanley Cup champions. In the 1966 Stanley Cup Finals, Montreal defeated Detroit in six games. This was their 24th Stanley Cup Finals overall, having won the championship fourteen times previously. This was the Toronto Maple Leafs' twenty-first and most recent Stanley Cup Finals, having won twelve championships previously. This was the thirteenth playoff series in the history of the Canadiens-Maple Leafs rivalry, and they split their twelve previous series. Their most recent series came in the 1966 semifinals, where Montreal won in a four-game sweep. These teams split their fourteen-game regular season series.

After splitting the first four games, the Maple Leafs won games five and six to win their thirteenth Stanley Cup championship. As of 2026, this is the last time the Maple Leafs won the Stanley Cup or went to the Stanley Cup Final, and the last Final to feature a team from Ontario until the Ottawa Senators made the Final in 2007.

April 20	Toronto Maple Leafs	2–6	Montreal Canadiens	Forum de Montréal	Recap
Larry Hillman (1) - 6:40		First period	6:25 - pp - Yvan Cournoyer (1); 11:19 - Henri Richard (1)
Jim Pappin (4) - pp - 12:59		Second period	5:03 - pp - Yvan Cournoyer (2); 6:36 - Jean Beliveau (3)
No scoring		Third period	4:53 - Henri Richard (2); 8:21 - Henri Richard (3)
Terry Sawchuk 30 saves / 35 shots Johnny Bower 8 saves / 9 shots		Goalie stats	Rogie Vachon 24 saves / 26 shots

April 22	Toronto Maple Leafs	3–0	Montreal Canadiens	Forum de Montréal	Recap
Pete Stemkowski (4) - pp - 12:14		First period	No scoring
Mike Walton (3) - pp - 9:12; Tim Horton (2) - 16:57		Second period	No scoring
No scoring		Third period	No scoring
Johnny Bower 31 saves / 31 shots		Goalie stats	Rogie Vachon 40 saves / 43 shots

April 25	Montreal Canadiens	2–3	2OT	Toronto Maple Leafs	Maple Leaf Gardens	Recap
Jean Beliveau (4) - pp - 2:27		First period		8:39 - pp - Pete Stemkowski (5)
John Ferguson (4) - 19:10		Second period		10:34 - Jim Pappin (5)
No scoring		Third period		No scoring
No scoring		Second overtime period		8:26 - Bob Pulford (1)
Rogie Vachon 51 saves / 54 shots		Goalie stats		Johnny Bower 61 saves / 63 shots

April 27	Montreal Canadiens	6–2	Toronto Maple Leafs	Maple Leaf Gardens	Recap
Ralph Backstrom (4) - 12:25; Jean Beliveau (5) - pp - 13:08		First period	No scoring
Henri Richard (4) - 2:26; Jean Beliveau (6) - 13:41; Ralph Backstrom (5) - 15:58		Second period	2:09 - pp - Mike Walton (4); 12:16 - Tim Horton (3)
Jimmy Roberts (1) - 15:17		Third period	No scoring
Rogie Vachon 35 saves / 37 shots		Goalie stats	Terry Sawchuk 34 saves / 40 shots

April 29	Toronto Maple Leafs	4–1	Montreal Canadiens	Forum de Montréal	Recap
Jim Pappin (6) - pp - 15:06		First period	6:03 - Leon Rochefort (1)
Brian Conacher (3) - 3:07; Marcel Pronovost (1) - sh - 12:02; Dave Keon (3) - 19:27		Second period	No scoring
No scoring		Third period	No scoring
Terry Sawchuk 37 saves / 38 shots		Goalie stats	Rogie Vachon 15 saves / 19 shots Gump Worsley 10 saves / 10 shots

May 2	Montreal Canadiens	1–3	Toronto Maple Leafs	Maple Leaf Gardens	Recap
No scoring		First period	No scoring
No scoring		Second period	6:25 - Ron Ellis (2); 19:24 - Jim Pappin (7)
Dick Duff (2) - 5:28		Third period	19:13 - en - George Armstrong (2)
Gump Worsley 33 saves / 35 shots		Goalie stats	Terry Sawchuk 40 saves / 41 shots

Toronto won series 4–2

== Statistical leaders ==
=== Skaters ===
These are the top eleven skaters based on points.

Player	Team	GP	G	A	Pts	+/–	PIM
Jim Pappin	Toronto Maple Leafs	12	7	8	15	+3	12
Pete Stemkowski	Toronto Maple Leafs	12	5	7	12	+4	20
Jean Beliveau	Montreal Canadiens	10	6	5	11	+2	26
Bob Pulford	Toronto Maple Leafs	12	1	10	11	+3	12
Henri Richard	Montreal Canadiens	10	4	6	10	+4	2
Frank Mahovlich	Toronto Maple Leafs	12	3	7	10	-4	8
Tim Horton	Toronto Maple Leafs	12	3	5	8	-4	25
Dave Keon	Toronto Maple Leafs	12	3	5	8	+1	0
Bobby Rousseau	Montreal Canadiens	10	1	7	8	+2	4
Ralph Backstrom	Montreal Canadiens	10	5	2	7	+2	6
Mike Walton	Toronto Maple Leafs	12	4	3	7	-3	2

=== Goaltenders ===
This is a combined table of the top five goaltenders based on goals against average and the top five goaltenders based on save percentage. The table is sorted by GAA, and the criteria for inclusion are bolded.

Player	Team	GP	W	L	SA	GA	GAA	SV%	SO	TOI
Gump Worsley	Montreal Canadiens	2	0	1	45	2	**1.50**	**.956**	0	79:52
Johnny Bower	Toronto Maple Leafs	4	2	0	115	5	**1.63**	**.957**	1	183:33
Rogie Vachon	Montreal Canadiens	9	6	3	296	22	**2.38**	**.926**	0	554:23
Terry Sawchuk	Toronto Maple Leafs	10	6	4	364	25	**2.66**	**.931**	0	563:08
Glenn Hall	Chicago Black Hawks	3	1	2	103	8	**2.74**	**.922**	0	175:22

== Awards and records ==
- Conn Smythe Trophy (playoff MVP) – Dave Keon, Toronto Maple Leafs

== See also ==
- 1966–67 NHL season

Preceded by 1966 Stanley Cup playoffs	Stanley Cup playoffs 1967	Succeeded by 1968 Stanley Cup playoffs
