= 1966–67 Toronto Maple Leafs season =

NHL hockey team season (won Stanley Cup)

1966–67 Toronto Maple Leafs
- Stanley Cup champions
- League: 3rd NHL
- 1966–67 record: 32–27–11
- Home record: 21–8–6
- Road record: 11–19–5
- Goals for: 204
- Goals against: 211

Team information
- General manager: Punch Imlach
- Coach: Punch Imlach
- Captain: George Armstrong
- Alternate captains: Bob Pulford; Allan Stanley
- Arena: Maple Leaf Gardens

Team leaders
- Goals: Ron Ellis (22)
- Assists: Dave Keon (33)
- Points: Dave Keon (52)
- Penalty minutes: Jim Pappin (89)
- Wins: Terry Sawchuk (15)
- Goals against average: Johnny Bower (2.64)

The 1966–67 Toronto Maple Leafs season was the 50th season of the Toronto NHL franchise, 40th as the Maple Leafs. The Leafs finished third in the NHL with a record of 32–27–11 for 75 points to qualify for the playoffs for the ninth year in a row in what was to be the final season of the Original Six period of NHL history. Toronto defeated the first-place Chicago Black Hawks four games to two in the semi-finals before upending their arch-rival Montreal Canadiens in six games to win their thirteenth Stanley Cup in franchise history. This remains the last time that the Maple Leafs have won the Stanley Cup, and the last time they have made an appearance in the Stanley Cup Final. This was the last Toronto based team in a major professional sports league to win a championship until the Toronto Blue Jays won the 1992 World Series. The Maple Leafs had the oldest average player age of any team to win the Stanley Cup to that point (later surpassed by the 1997–98 Detroit Red Wings).

== Offseason ==
=== Intra-league draft ===
June 15, 1966	To Montreal Canadiens Wally Boyer
June 15, 1966	From Montreal Canadiens Don Blackburn
June 15, 1966	From New York Rangers John Brenneman
June 15, 1966	To New York Rangers Orland Kurtenbach

=== Inter-league draft ===
June 1, 1966	From Tulsa Oilers Danny Johnson

=== Reverse draft ===
June 12, 1966	To Providence Reds (AHL) John Sleaver

=== Free agents ===
Player	Former team
Andre Hinse	Undrafted Free Agent

== Regular season ==
=== Five to a Crease ===
In 1966–67, the Maple Leafs had five goaltenders suit up during the regular season. Besides Bower and Sawchuk, the Maple Leafs employed Bruce Gamble, Al Smith, and Gary Smith. As Bower struggled with injuries, Al Smith actually sat on the bench for two of the last three Stanley Cup games. For many inside the organization, the controversy was that Smith was on the bench, and not a proven player like Gamble. The concern was that if Sawchuk was injured, having Smith instead of Gamble would be a huge risk. The source of the controversy was that Bruce Gamble was competing for the Rochester Americans. Imlach was a part owner of the Americans, and was anxious to protect Rochester's roster at playoff time, as a means of protecting his investment.

=== Final standings ===
Pos	Team	Pld	W	L	T	GF	GA	GD	Pts
1	Chicago Black Hawks	70	41	17	12	264	170	+94	94
2	Montreal Canadiens	70	32	25	13	202	188	+14	77
3	Toronto Maple Leafs	70	32	27	11	204	211	−7	75
4	New York Rangers	70	30	28	12	188	189	−1	72
5	Detroit Red Wings	70	27	39	4	212	241	−29	58
6	Boston Bruins	70	17	43	10	182	253	−71	44

Source: National Hockey League

=== Record vs. opponents ===
1966–67 NHL Records
Team	BOS	CHI	DET	MTL	NYR	TOR
Boston	—	2–11–1	6–6–2	5–7–2	2–8–4	2–11–1
Chicago	11–2–1	—	10–4	5–2–7	7–5–2	8–4–2
Detroit	6–6–2	4–10	—	4–10	7–7	6–6–2
Montreal	7–5–2	2–5–7	10–4	—	7–5–2	6–6–2
New York	8–2–4	5–7–2	7–7	5–7–2	—	5–5–4
Toronto	11–2–1	4–8–2	6–6–2	6–6–2	5–5–4	—

== Schedule and results ==
1966–67 regular season
October: 1–1–2 (home: 1–0–2; road: 0–1–0)

Game	Result	Date	Score	Opponent	Record	Pts
1	T	October 22, 1966	4–4	New York Rangers (1966–67)	0–0–1	1
2	L	October 23, 1966	0–1	@ New York Rangers (1966–67)	0–1–1	1
3	W	October 26, 1966	3–2	Detroit Red Wings (1966–67)	1–1–1	3
4	T	October 29, 1966	3–3	Boston Bruins (1966–67)	1–1–2	4

November: 6–3–5 (home: 5–0–1; road: 1–3–4)

Game	Result	Date	Score	Opponent	Record	Pts
5	T	November 2, 1966	2–2	Montreal Canadiens (1966–67)	1–1–3	5
6	T	November 3, 1966	2–2	@ Detroit Red Wings (1966–67)	1–1–4	6
7	W	November 5, 1966	3–1	New York Rangers (1966–67)	2–1–4	8
8	T	November 6, 1966	3–3	@ New York Rangers (1966–67)	2–1–5	9
9	W	November 9, 1966	3–2	@ Montreal Canadiens (1966–67)	3–1–5	11
10	L	November 10, 1966	0–4	@ Boston Bruins (1966–67)	3–2–5	11
11	T	November 12, 1966	3–3	@ Detroit Red Wings (1966–67)	3–2–6	12
12	L	November 13, 1966	1–6	@ Chicago Black Hawks (1966–67)	3–3–6	12
13	W	November 19, 1966	5–1	Montreal Canadiens (1966–67)	4–3–6	14
14	T	November 20, 1966	2–2	@ Chicago Black Hawks (1966–67)	4–3–7	15
15	W	November 23, 1966	6–3	Chicago Black Hawks (1966–67)	5–3–7	17
16	W	November 26, 1966	4–2	Boston Bruins (1966–67)	6–3–7	19
17	L	November 27, 1966	0–5	@ New York Rangers (1966–67)	6–4–7	19
18	W	November 30, 1966	3–2	Montreal Canadiens (1966–67)	7–4–7	21

December: 6–6–0 (home: 4–2–0; road: 2–4–0)

Game	Result	Date	Score	Opponent	Record	Pts
19	W	December 3, 1966	5–2	Detroit Red Wings (1966–67)	8–4–7	23
20	W	December 4, 1966	8–3	@ Boston Bruins (1966–67)	9–4–7	25
21	L	December 7, 1966	3–6	@ Montreal Canadiens (1966–67)	9–5–7	25
22	W	December 10, 1966	5–3	Chicago Black Hawks (1966–67)	10–5–7	27
23	L	December 11, 1966	1–4	@ Detroit Red Wings (1966–67)	10–6–7	27
24	W	December 14, 1966	2–1	Boston Bruins (1966–67)	11–6–7	29
25	L	December 17, 1966	1–3	New York Rangers (1966–67)	11–7–7	29
26	L	December 18, 1966	1–3	@ Chicago Black Hawks (1966–67)	11–8–7	29
27	L	December 21, 1966	2–6	@ Montreal Canadiens (1966–67)	11–9–7	29
28	W	December 24, 1966	3–0	Boston Bruins (1966–67)	12–9–7	31
29	W	December 25, 1966	4–2	@ Boston Bruins (1966–67)	13–9–7	33
30	L	December 31, 1966	1–5	Chicago Black Hawks (1966–67)	13–10–7	33

January: 4–8–1 (home: 2–3–1; road: 2–5–0)

Game	Result	Date	Score	Opponent	Record	Pts
31	W	January 1, 1967	2–1	@ New York Rangers (1966–67)	14–10–7	35
32	T	January 4, 1967	1–1	New York Rangers (1966–67)	14–10–8	37
33	W	January 7, 1967	5–2	Boston Bruins (1966–67)	15–10–8	38
34	L	January 8, 1967	1–3	@ Detroit Red Wings (1966–67)	15–11–8	38
35	W	January 11, 1967	2–1	@ Montreal Canadiens (1966–67)	16–11–8	40
36	W	January 14, 1967	5–2	Detroit Red Wings (1966–67)	17–11–8	42
37	L	January 15, 1967	0–4	@ Chicago Black Hawks (1966–67)	17–12–8	42
38	L	January 19, 1967	2–6	@ Detroit Red Wings (1966–67)	17–13–8	42
39	L	January 21, 1967	4–5	Detroit Red Wings (1966–67)	17–14–8	42
40	L	January 22, 1967	1–3	@ Boston Bruins (1966–67)	17–15–8	42
41	L	January 25, 1967	1–3	Montreal Canadiens (1966–67)	17–16–8	42
42	L	January 28, 1967	2–5	Chicago Black Hawks (1966–67)	17–17–8	42
43	L	January 29, 1967	1–5	@ Chicago Black Hawks (1966–67)	17–18–8	42

February: 7–3–1 (home: 4–1–1; road: 3–2–0)

Game	Result	Date	Score	Opponent	Record	Pts
44	L	February 1, 1967	1–7	@ Montreal Canadiens (1966–67)	17–19–8	42
45	L	February 5, 1967	1–4	@ New York Rangers (1966–67)	17–20–8	42
46	L	February 8, 1967	2–5	Detroit Red Wings (1966–67)	17–21–8	42
47	T	February 11, 1967	4–4	Chicago Black Hawks (1966–67)	17–21–9	43
48	W	February 12, 1967	2–1	@ Boston Bruins (1966–67)	18–21–9	45
49	W	February 15, 1967	6–0	New York Rangers (1966–67)	19–21–9	47
50	W	February 18, 1967	5–3	Boston Bruins (1966–67)	20–21–9	49
51	W	February 22, 1967	5–2	Montreal Canadiens (1966–67)	21–21–9	51
52	W	February 23, 1967	4–2	@ Detroit Red Wings (1966–67)	22–21–9	53
53	W	February 25, 1967	4–0	Detroit Red Wings (1966–67)	23–21–9	55
54	W	February 26, 1967	4–2	@ New York Rangers (1966–67)	24–21–9	57

March: 6–6–2 (home: 4–2–1; road: 2–4–1)

Game	Result	Date	Score	Opponent	Record	Pts
55	T	March 1, 1967	1–1	@ Montreal Canadiens (1966–67)	24–21–10	58
56	W	March 4, 1967	3–0	Chicago Black Hawks (1966–67)	25–21–10	60
57	L	March 5, 1967	2–5	@ Chicago Black Hawks (1966–67)	25–22–10	60
58	W	March 8, 1967	6–4	Montreal Canadiens (1966–67)	26–22–10	62
59	T	March 11, 1967	2–2	New York Rangers (1966–67)	26–22–11	63
60	L	March 12, 1967	0–5	@ Chicago Black Hawks (1966–67)	26–23–11	63
61	L	March 15, 1967	2–4	Detroit Red Wings (1966–67)	26–24–11	63
62	W	March 18, 1967	9–5	Chicago Black Hawks (1966–67)	27–24–11	65
63	W	March 19, 1967	6–5	@ Detroit Red Wings (1966–67)	28–24–11	67
64	L	March 22, 1967	3–5	Montreal Canadiens (1966–67)	28–25–11	67
65	W	March 23, 1967	5–3	@ Boston Bruins (1966–67)	29–25–11	69
66	W	March 25, 1967	4–3	Boston Bruins (1966–67)	30–25–11	71
67	L	March 26, 1967	0–4	@ New York Rangers (1966–67)	30–26–11	71
68	L	March 29, 1967	3–5	@ Montreal Canadiens (1966–67)	30–27–11	71

April: 2–0–0 (home: 1–0–0; road: 1–0–0)

Game	Result	Date	Score	Opponent	Record	Pts
69	W	April 1, 1967	5–1	New York Rangers (1966–67)	31–27–11	73
70	W	April 2, 1967	5–2	@ Boston Bruins (1966–67)	32–27–11	75

Legend: Win (2 points) Loss (0 points) Tie (1 point)

== Playoffs ==
1967 Stanley Cup playoffs
Semifinals vs. (1) Chicago Black Hawks – Maple Leafs win 4–2

Game	Result	Date	Score	OT	Opponent	Series
1	L	April 6, 1967	2–5		@ Chicago Black Hawks	0–1
2	W	April 9, 1967	3–1		@ Chicago Black Hawks	1–1
3	W	April 11, 1967	3–1		Chicago Black Hawks	2–1
4	L	April 13, 1967	3–4		Chicago Black Hawks	2–2
5	W	April 15, 1967	4–2		@ Chicago Black Hawks	3–2
6	W	April 18, 1967	3–1		Chicago Black Hawks	4–2

Stanley Cup Finals vs. (2) Montreal Canadiens – Maple Leafs win 4–2

Game	Result	Date	Score	OT	Opponent	Series
1	L	April 20, 1967	2–6		@ Montreal Canadiens	0–1
2	W	April 22, 1967	3–0		@ Montreal Canadiens	1–1
3	W	April 25, 1967	3–2	2OT	Montreal Canadiens	2–1
4	L	April 27, 1967	2–6		Montreal Canadiens	2–2
5	W	April 29, 1967	4–1		@ Montreal Canadiens	3–2
6	W	May 2, 1967	3–1		Montreal Canadiens	4–2

Legend: Win Loss

== Player statistics ==
=== Forwards ===
Note: GP= Games played; G= Goals; AST= Assists; PTS = Points; PIM = Penalties In Minutes

Player	GP	G	AST	PTS	PIM
Dave Keon	66	19	33	52	2
Frank Mahovlich	63	18	28	46	44
Bob Pulford	67	17	28	45	28
Ron Ellis	67	22	23	45	14
Pete Stemkowski	68	13	22	35	75
George Armstrong	70	9	24	33	26
Jim Pappin	64	21	11	32	89
Larry Jeffrey	56	11	17	28	27
Brian Conacher	66	14	13	27	47
Eddie Shack	63	11	14	25	58
Mike Walton	31	7	10	17	13
John Brenneman	41	6	4	10	4
Brit Selby	6	1	1	2	0
Wayne Carleton	5	1	0	1	14
Brent Imlach	1	0	0	0	0
Dick Gamble	1	0	0	0	0

=== Defencemen ===
Note: GP= Games played; G= Goals; AST= Assists; PTS = Points; PIM = Points

Player	GP	G	AST	PTS	PIM
Red Kelly	61	14	24	38	4
Tim Horton	70	8	17	25	70
Larry Hillman	55	4	19	23	40
Marcel Pronovost	58	2	12	14	28
Kent Douglas	39	2	12	14	48
Allan Stanley	53	1	12	13	20
Bob Baun	54	2	8	10	83
Jim McKenny	6	1	0	1	0
Duane Rupp	3	0	0	0	0

=== Goaltending ===
Note: GP= Games played; W= Wins; L= Losses; T = Ties; SO = Shutouts; GAA = Goals Against

Player	GP	W	L	T	SO	GAA
Terry Sawchuk	28	15	5	4	2	2.81
Johnny Bower	27	12	9	3	2	2.64
Bruce Gamble	23	5	10	4	0	3.39
Gary Smith	2	0	2	0	0	3.65
Al Smith	1	0	1	0	0	5.00

== Awards and honors ==
- Dave Keon, Conn Smythe Trophy
- 2024 NHL Alumni Association's Keith Magnuson ‘Man of the Year’ award

== Transactions ==
The Maple Leafs have been involved in the following transactions during the 1966–67 season.

=== Trades ===
May 15, 1967	To Boston Bruins Eddie Shack	To Toronto Maple Leafs Murray Oliver; Cash
June 1, 1967	To New York Rangers Cash	To Toronto Maple Leafs Pete Conacher

== Draft picks ==
Toronto's draft picks at the 1966 NHL amateur draft held at the Mount Royal Hotel in Montreal.

Round	#	Player	Nationality	College/Junior/Club team (League)
1	4	John Wright	Canada	West Clair Gaels (OHA)
2	10	Cam Crosby	Canada	Toronto Marlboros (OHA)
3	16	Rick Ley	Canada	Niagara Falls Flyers (OHA)
4	22	Dale MacLeish	Canada	Peterborough Petes (OHA)
