= 1967 Stanley Cup Final =

1967 ice hockey championship series

	1	2	3	4	5	6	Total
Toronto Maple Leafs	2	3	3**	2	4	3	4
Montreal Canadiens	6	0	2**	6	1	1	2
- * – Denotes overtime period(s)
- Location(s): Montreal: Montreal Forum (1, 2, 5); Toronto: Maple Leaf Gardens (3, 4, 6)
- Coaches: Toronto: Punch Imlach; Montreal: Toe Blake
- Captains: Toronto: George Armstrong; Montreal: Jean Beliveau
- Dates: April 20 – May 2, 1967
- MVP: Dave Keon (Maple Leafs)
- Series-winning goal: Jim Pappin (19:24, second)
- Hall of Famers: Maple Leafs: George Armstrong (1975); Johnny Bower (1976); Tim Horton (1977); Red Kelly (1969); Dave Keon (1986); Frank Mahovlich (1981); Marcel Pronovost (1978); Bob Pulford (1991); Terry Sawchuk (1971); Allan Stanley (1981); Canadiens: Jean Beliveau (1972); Yvan Cournoyer (1982); Dick Duff (2006); Jacques Laperriere (1987); Henri Richard (1979); Rogie Vachon (2016); Gump Worsley (1980); Coaches: Toe Blake (1966, player); Punch Imlach (1984); Officials: Josh Ashley (1981); Neil Armstrong (1991); Matt Pavelich (1987)

The 1967 Stanley Cup Final was the championship series of the National Hockey League's (NHL) 1966–67 season, and the culmination of the 1967 Stanley Cup playoffs. A best-of-seven series, it was contested between the Montreal Canadiens and the Toronto Maple Leafs. This was the fifth and most recent Cup Final Meeting in the history of the Canadiens-Maple Leafs rivalry. The Maple Leafs defeated the Canadiens in six games to win their thirteenth and most recent Stanley Cup championship.

To date, this is Toronto's last appearance in the Stanley Cup Final. The Maple Leafs currently have the longest-active championship drought in the NHL, and the tenth longest championship drought in North American sports. The 1967 series was also the last Stanley Cup Final in the Original Six era. This was also the last all-Canadian Final series until 1986, the last Stanley Cup Final to be played in Ontario until 2007, and the last championship series to feature a Toronto-based team until the Blue Jays made the 1992 World Series.

== Paths to the Final ==
This was the last Stanley Cup before the 1967 expansion, which meant there were only two rounds and three series in total played in the playoffs. Montreal defeated New York to advance to the Final and Toronto defeated Chicago.

== Game summaries ==
The average age of the Leafs' players was 31, the oldest lineup to win the Cup. Johnny Bower was 42 and Allan Stanley was 41. Toronto won the series in six games, with Dave Keon won the Conn Smythe Trophy.

=== Game one ===
April 20	Toronto Maple Leafs	2–6	Montreal Canadiens	Montreal Forum	Recap

Montreal won the opener 6–2, with Henri Richard recording a hat trick and an assist, and Yvan Cournoyer scoring twice.

Scoring summary
Period	Team	Goal	Assist(s)	Time	Score
1st	MTL	Yvan Cournoyer (1) – pp	Jean Beliveau (4) and Bobby Rousseau (4)	06:25	1–0 MTL
1st	TOR	Larry Hillman (1)	Jim Pappin (5)	06:40	1–1
1st	MTL	Henri Richard (1)	Leon Rochefort (1) and Dave Balon (1)	11:19	2–1 MTL
2nd	MTL	Yvan Cournoyer (2) – pp	Bobby Rousseau (5) and Henri Richard (4)	05:03	3–1 MTL
2nd	MTL	Jean Beliveau (3)	Gilles Tremblay (1)	06:36	4–1 MTL
2nd	TOR	Jim Pappin (4) – pp	Tim Horton (3) and Bob Pulford (5)	12:59	4–2 MTL
3rd	MTL	Henri Richard (2)	Dave Balon (2)	04:53	5–2 MTL
3rd	MTL	Henri Richard (3)	J. C. Tremblay (3)	08:21	6–2 MTL
Penalty summary
Period	Team	Player	Penalty	Time	PIM
1st	MTL	Claude Larose	High-sticking	01:07	2:00
1st	TOR	Frank Mahovlich	Interference	05:56	2:00
1st	MTL	Ted Harris	Hooking	08:35	2:00
1st	MTL	Ted Harris	Hooking	11:53	2:00
1st	TOR	Bench (served by Aut Erickson)	Too many men on the ice	12:48	2:00
1st	MTL	Jean Beliveau	Elbowing	14:51	2:00
1st	MTL	Leon Rochefort	Charging	18:27	2:00
2nd	TOR	Jim Pappin	Hooking	02:06	2:00
2nd	TOR	Brian Conacher	Elbowing	04:28	2:00
2nd	MTL	Terry Harper	Elbowing	12:41	2:00
2nd	MTL	Claude Larose	Slashing	13:12	2:00
2nd	TOR	Tim Horton	Hooking	14:35	2:00
3rd	TOR	Brian Conacher	Charging	09:14	2:00
3rd	MTL	Dave Balon	Tripping	13:23	2:00
3rd	MTL	John Ferguson	Hooking	18:34	2:00

Shots by period
Team	1	2	3	Total
Toronto	8	10	8	26
Montreal	12	18	14	44

=== Game two ===
April 22	Toronto Maple Leafs	3–0	Montreal Canadiens	Montreal Forum	Recap

With Terry Sawchuk being pulled in game one, Johnny Bower started the second game and provided the Leafs with a shutout win, stopping all 31 shots in a 3–0 victory.

Scoring summary
Period	Team	Goal	Assist(s)	Time	Score
1st	TOR	Pete Stemkowski (4) – pp	Bob Pulford (4) and Mike Walton (3)	12:14	1–0 TOR
2nd	TOR	Mike Walton (3) – pp	Jim Pappin (4) and Frank Mahovlich (6)	09:12	2–0 TOR
2nd	TOR	Tim Horton (2)	Pete Stemkowski (4) and Brian Conacher (2)	16:57	3–0 TOR
3rd	None				
Penalty summary
Period	Team	Player	Penalty	Time	PIM
1st	TOR	Ron Ellis	Holding	01:29	2:00
1st	MTL	Terry Harper	Roughing	11:59	2:00
1st	TOR	Allan Stanley	Tripping	14:56	2:00
1st	MTL	Ted Harris	Hooking	17:17	2:00
1st	MTL	John Ferguson	Roughing	19:41	2:00
1st	TOR	Brian Conacher	Roughing	19:41	2:00
2nd	TOR	Tim Horton	Tripping	05:23	2:00
2nd	MTL	Yvan Cournoyer	Slashing	07:18	2:00
2nd	TOR	Marcel Pronovost	Tripping	10:23	2:00
2nd	TOR	Brian Conacher	Charging	11:58	2:00
2nd	MTL	John Ferguson	Interference	14:26	2:00
3rd	TOR	Brian Conacher	Hooking	07:58	2:00
3rd	MTL	Jean Beliveau	Slashing	14:21	2:00
3rd	TOR	Pete Stemkowski	Tripping	16:02	2:00

Shots by period
Team	1	2	3	Total
Toronto	14	10	19	43
Montreal	13	9	9	31

=== Game three ===
April 25	Montreal Canadiens	2–3	2OT	Toronto Maple Leafs	Maple Leaf Gardens	Recap

Bower was back in net for game three, making 61 saves in the contest and winning the game 3–2 on Bob Pulford's double-overtime goal. This game has been described as "one of the most exciting games ever played".

Scoring summary
Period	Team	Goal	Assist(s)	Time	Score
1st	MTL	Jean Beliveau (4) – pp	Bobby Rousseau (6) and Dick Duff (2)	02:27	1–0 MTL
1st	TOR	Pete Stemkowski (5) – pp	Larry Hillman (2) and Jim Pappin (7)	08:39	1–1
2nd	TOR	Jim Pappin (5)	Tim Horton (4) and Bob Pulford (7)	10:34	2–1 TOR
2nd	MTL	John Ferguson (4)	Jean Beliveau (5)	19:10	2–2
3rd	None				
OT	None				
2OT	TOR	Bob Pulford (1)	Pete Stemkowski (5) and Jim Pappin (8)	08:26	3–2 TOR
Penalty summary
Period	Team	Player	Penalty	Time	PIM
1st	TOR	Tim Horton	Interference	01:13	2:00
1st	MTL	John Ferguson	Interference	08:04	2:00
1st	TOR	Johnny Bower	Tripping	09:27	2:00
1st	MTL	Claude Larose	Slashing	13:52	2:00
1st	TOR	Frank Mahovlich	Tripping	15:57	2:00
2nd	TOR	Allan Stanley	Tripping	02:31	2:00
2nd	MTL	Claude Larose	Fighting – major	06:10	5:00
2nd	TOR	Brian Conacher	Fighting – major	06:10	5:00
2nd	MTL	Yvan Cournoyer	High-sticking	06:38	2:00
2nd	TOR	Eddie Shack	High-sticking	06:38	2:00
2nd	MTL	Dick Duff	Interference	16:17	2:00
2nd	MTL	Jean Beliveau	Charging	19:32	2:00
2nd	TOR	Frank Mahovlich	Cross-checking	19:32	2:00
3rd	MTL	John Ferguson	Hooking	03:23	2:00
OT	None				
2OT	None				

Shots by period
Team	1	2	3	OT	2OT	Total
Montreal	20	8	14	13	8	63
Toronto	12	12	10	11	9	54

=== Game four ===
April 27	Toronto Maple Leafs	2–6	Montreal Canadiens	Maple Leaf Gardens	Recap

Johnny Bower was injured before game four and Terry Sawchuk had to replace him. Al Smith was called up from the minors to serve as back-up for the fourth and fifth games. The Canadiens defeated the Leafs 6–2 again, this time in Toronto to even the series, with Jean Beliveau and Ralph Backstrom both recording two goals for Montreal.

Scoring summary
Period	Team	Goal	Assist(s)	Time	Score
1st	MTL	Ralph Backstrom (4)	Claude Larose (5)	12:25	1–0 MTL
1st	MTL	Jean Beliveau (5) – pp	Bobby Rousseau (7) and Yvan Cournoyer (2)	13:08	2–0 MTL
2nd	TOR	Mike Walton (4) – pp	Peter Stemkowski (6) and Bob Pulford (8)	02:09	2–1 MTL
2nd	MTL	Henri Richard (4)	Unassisted	02:26	3–1 MTL
2nd	TOR	Tim Horton (3)	Unassisted	12:16	3–2 MTL
2nd	MTL	Jean Beliveau (6)	John Ferguson (2) and Yvan Cournoyer (3)	13:41	4–2 MTL
2nd	MTL	Ralph Backstrom (5)	J. C. Tremblay (4)	15:58	5–2 MTL
3rd	MTL	Jim Roberts (1)	Henri Richard (5)	15:17	6–2 MTL
Penalty summary
Period	Team	Player	Penalty	Time	PIM
1st	MTL	Jacques Laperriere	Interference	00:18	2:00
1st	TOR	George Armstrong	Interference	06:19	2:00
1st	TOR	Marcel Pronovost	Tripping	12:38	2:00
2nd	MTL	Jean Beliveau	Boarding	01:46	2:00
2nd	TOR	George Armstrong	Hooking	04:35	2:00
3rd	MTL	Ted Harris	Tripping	02:32	2:00
3rd	TOR	Eddie Shack	Charging	08:21	2:00
3rd	MTL	Claude Larose	Slashing	16:34	2:00
3rd	TOR	Bobby Baun	Hooking	16:34	2:00
3rd	MTL	Ted Harris	Slashing	17:09	2:00
3rd	TOR	Eddie Shack	Slashing	17:09	2:00
3rd	MTL	John Ferguson	Roughing	19:29	2:00
3rd	TOR	Eddie Shack	Roughing	19:29	2:00

Shots by period
Team	1	2	3	Total
Montreal	19	10	11	40
Toronto	11	16	10	37

=== Game five ===
April 29	Toronto Maple Leafs	4–1	Montreal Canadiens	Montreal Forum	Recap

Sawchuk would play well in game five, making 37 saves in a 4–1 victory.

Scoring summary
Period	Team	Goal	Assist(s)	Time	Score
1st	MTL	Leon Rochefort (1)	Dick Duff (3) and Henri Richard (6)	06:03	1–0 MTL
1st	TOR	Jim Pappin (6)	Dave Keon (5) and Frank Mahovlich (7)	15:06	1–1
2nd	TOR	Brian Conacher (3)	Red Kelly (3) and Ron Ellis (1)	03:07	2–1 TOR
2nd	TOR	Marcel Pronovost (1) – sh	Unassisted	12:02	3–1 TOR
2nd	TOR	Dave Keon (3)	Tim Horton (5)	19:27	4–1 TOR
3rd	None				
Penalty summary
Period	Team	Player	Penalty	Time	PIM
1st	TOR	Jim Pappin	Charging	03:09	2:00
1st	MTL	Claude Larose	Boarding	13:30	2:00
1st	TOR	Tim Horton	Interference	18:29	2:00
2nd	MTL	John Ferguson	Charging	06:54	2:00
2nd	TOR	Red Kelly	Interference	11:40	2:00
2nd	MTL	Ted Harris	Elbowing	14:55	2:00
2nd	MTL	Dick Duff	Roughing	17:35	2:00
2nd	TOR	Ron Ellis	Roughing	17:35	2:00
3rd	TOR	Frank Mahovlich	Tripping	06:17	2:00

Shots by period
Team	1	2	3	Total
Toronto	7	12	10	29
Montreal	13	13	12	38

=== Game six ===
May 2	Montreal Canadiens	1–3	Toronto Maple Leafs	Maple Leaf Gardens	Recap

In the sixth game, Johnny Bower returned to the line-up as back up for Toronto. Gump Worsley would also replace Rogie Vachon for Montreal, who had been pulled in game five. Jim Pappin scored his seventh goal of the playoffs and Sawchuk stopped 40 shots helping Toronto win the Cup. Pappin had four goals and four assists in the final series. Captain George Armstrong scored the 3–1 empty-net insurance goal to put game six out of reach.

Scoring summary
Period	Team	Goal	Assist(s)	Time	Score
1st	None				
2nd	TOR	Ron Ellis (2)	Red Kelly (4) and Allan Stanley (2)	06:25	1–0 TOR
2nd	TOR	Jim Pappin (7)	Pete Stemkowski (7) and Bob Pulford (9)	19:24	2–0 TOR
3rd	MTL	Dick Duff (2)	Ted Harris (1)	05:28	2–1 TOR
3rd	TOR	George Armstrong (2) – en	Bob Pulford (10) and Red Kelly (5)	19:13	3–1 TOR
Penalty summary
Period	Team	Player	Penalty	Time	PIM
1st	TOR	Brian Conacher	Interference	02:30	2:00
1st	MTL	Ralph Backstrom	Holding	05:16	2:00
1st	MTL	Jean Beliveau	Cross-checking	10:21	2:00
1st	TOR	Brian Conacher	Interference	13:25	2:00
1st	MTL	John Ferguson	Elbowing	18:50	2:00
2nd	MTL	Terry Harper	Holding	03:05	2:00
2nd	TOR	Pete Stemkowski	Cross-checking	07:14	2:00
2nd	TOR	Allan Stanley	Hooking	13:23	2:00
2nd	MTL	Bobby Rousseau	Tripping	14:44	2:00
3rd	TOR	Jim Pappin	Slashing	11:46	2:00

Shots by period
Team	1	2	3	Total
Montreal	17	14	10	41
Toronto	11	16	9	35

== Stanley Cup engraving ==
The 1967 Stanley Cup was presented to Maple Leafs captain George Armstrong by NHL President Clarence Campbell following the Maple Leafs 3–1 win over the Canadiens in Game Six.

The following Maple Leafs players and staff had their names engraved on the Stanley Cup.

1966–67 Toronto Maple Leafs

=== Players ===
Centers

Wingers

- 8 Ron Ellis
- 10 George Armstrong (Captain)
- 15 Larry Jeffrey
- 18 Jim Pappin
- 20 Bob Pulford (A)
- 23 Eddie Shack
- 27 Frank Mahovlich

Defencemen

- 2 Larry Hillman
- 3 Marcel Pronovost
- 7 Miles Tim Horton
- 21 Bob Baun
- 24 Aut Erickson*
- 26 Allan Stanley (A)

Goaltenders

- 1 Johnny Bower
- 30 Terry Sawchuk
- 1 Al Smith^
- * Did not play in the regular season.^{[A]}

=== Coaching and administrative staff ===
- Stafford Smythe (President/Owner), Harold Ballard (Exe. Vice President/Owner)
- John W. H. Bassett (Chairman/Owner), George Punch Imlach (Manager-Coach)
- Frank King Clancy (Asst. Manager-Coach), Bob Davidson (Chief Scout)
- John Anderson (Business Manager)
- Bob Haggert (Trainer), Tom Nayler (Asst. Trainer)
- Dr. Karl Elieff (Physiotherapist)
- Richard Smythe (Mascot)

=== Stanley Cup engraving ===
- The first "K" in Peter Stemkowski's name was engraved backwards.
- Stafford Smythe's name was misspelled C. ST FFORD SMYTHE PRESIDENT, missing an "A". Both mistakes were corrected on the Replica Cup created in 1992–93.
- The job title for John Anderson was misspelled BUISS MANN (sic)
- Leonard "Red" Kelly won the Stanley Cup 8 times. He was engraved as Leonard Kelly in 1954, 1955, 1962, 1963, and 1964. Kelly was engraved as Red Kelly in 1950, 1952, and 1967.
- ^{^A} #25 Milan Marcetta (C) played 3 games in the Final, and #24 Aut Erickson (D) played 1 game in the Final, qualifying to be on the Stanley Cup engraving. Neither player played a game for Toronto in the regular season.
- Johnny Bower (G) was 42 years old when he won his fourth and final Stanley Cup.

Left off the Stanley Cup for playing in the minors during the playoffs.

- #24 John Brenneman (LW) played 41 games, but played in the minors during the playoffs
- #19 Kent Douglas (D) played 39 games, but played in the minors during the playoffs
- #1-#30 Bruce Gamble (G) played 23 regular-season games, dressed for 35, but was playing in the minors during the playoffs.
- #1 Al Smith^ (G) was dressed in the finals, due to Johnny Bowers missing games 4 and 5 (of 6) in the finals due to injury. Smith's name was left off the Cup because he only played 1 regular-season game and did not play in the playoffs. Al Smith qualified to be on the Cup because he was dressed in the series.
- Dr. Hugh Symthe (Team Physician) – Also left (His name is on cup 1942 with Toronto as mascot).

=== Won the Stanley Cup 4 times in 6 years with Toronto 1962, 1963, 1964, 1967 ===
- George Armstrong, Bob Baun, Johnny Bower, Larry Hillman, Tim Horton, Red Kelly, Dave Keon, Frank Mahovlich, Bob Pulford, Eddie Shack, Allan Stanley (11 players), Stafford Smythe, Harold Ballard, John Bassett, Punch Imlach, King Clancy, Bob Haggert, Tom Nayler (7 non-players), Bob Davidson, Karl Elieff (were part of all 4 cups, but were not included on the cup each season.)

== See also ==
- 1966–67 NHL season

== Notes ==
Preceded by Montreal Canadiens; 1966	Toronto Maple Leafs; Stanley Cup champions 1967	Succeeded by Montreal Canadiens; 1968
