= Rob Robinson (ice hockey) =

Canadian ice hockey player

- Born: April 19, 1967 (age 57); St. Catharines, Ontario, Canada
- Height: 6 ft 2 in (188 cm)
- Weight: 220 lb (100 kg; 15 st 10 lb)
- Position: Defense
- Shot: Left
- Played for: St. Louis Blues
- NHL draft: 117th overall, 1987; St. Louis Blues
- Playing career: 1988–2001

Robert Douglas Robinson (born April 19, 1967) is a Canadian former professional ice hockey defenceman who played 22 games in the National Hockey League with the St. Louis Blues. He is the son of the former NHL player, Doug Robinson.

== Career statistics ==
			Regular season					Playoffs
Season	Team	League	GP	G	A	Pts	PIM	GP	G	A	Pts	PIM
1984–85	St. Catharines Falcons	GHL	12	1	3	4	12	—	—	—	—	—
1985–86	St. Catharines Falcons	GHL	40	5	29	34	28	—	—	—	—	—
1985–86	Miami University	NCAA	38	1	9	10	24	—	—	—	—	—
1986–87	Miami University	NCAA	33	3	5	8	32	—	—	—	—	—
1987–88	Miami University	NCAA	35	1	3	4	56	—	—	—	—	—
1988–89	Miami University	NCAA	30	3	4	7	42	—	—	—	—	—
1988–89	Peoria Rivermen	IHL	11	2	0	2	6	—	—	—	—	—
1989–90	Peoria Rivermen	IHL	60	2	11	13	72	5	0	1	1	10
1990–91	Peoria Rivermen	IHL	79	2	21	23	42	19	0	6	6	18
1991–92	Peoria Rivermen	IHL	35	1	10	11	29	10	0	2	2	12
1991–92	St. Louis Blues	NHL	22	0	1	1	8	—	—	—	—	—
1992–93	Peoria Rivermen	IHL	34	0	4	4	38	—	—	—	—	—
1993–94	Kalamazoo Wings	IHL	67	3	12	15	32	5	0	0	0	2
1994–95	Houston Aeros	IHL	70	3	12	15	54	4	0	1	1	4
1995–96	Syracuse Crunch	AHL	40	2	6	8	12	16	0	2	2	2
1996–97	VEU Feldkirch	Austria	55	4	6	10	30	—	—	—	—	—
1997–98	Frankfurt Lions	DEL	44	0	10	10	51	7	0	2	2	29
1998–99	Manchester Storm	BISL	42	1	11	12	22	7	0	1	1	6
1999–00	Manchester Storm	BISL	41	1	6	7	36	5	0	1	1	0
2000–01	Manchester Storm	BISL	44	0	5	5	16	6	1	0	1	8
NHL totals			22	0	1	1	8	—	—	—	—	—
IHL totals			356	13	70	83	273	43	0	10	10	46
