= Jim Pappin =

Canadian ice hockey player (1939–2022)

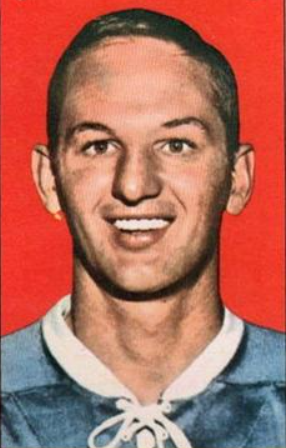
- Born: September 10, 1939 Copper Cliff, Ontario, Canada
- Died: June 29, 2022 (aged 82) Palm Desert, California, US
- Height: 6 ft 0 in (183 cm)
- Weight: 190 lb (86 kg; 13 st 8 lb)
- Position: Right wing
- Shot: Right
- Played for: Toronto Maple Leafs; Chicago Black Hawks; California Golden Seals; Cleveland Barons
- Playing career: 1963–1977

James Joseph Pappin (September 10, 1939 – June 29, 2022) was a Canadian professional ice hockey player who was a right winger for 14 seasons in the National Hockey League (NHL). He played for the Toronto Maple Leafs, Chicago Black Hawks, and the California Golden Seals/Cleveland Barons from 1963 to 1977. After retiring he worked as a scout for the Black Hawks, St. Louis Blues, and Anaheim Ducks, and briefly served as head coach of the Milwaukee Admirals.

Pappin was signed by the Toronto Maple Leafs in 1960 and played for its Rochester Americans affiliate throughout his eight seasons with the franchise. He was part of Rochester's Calder Cup-winning sides in 1965, 1966, and 1968, and won the Stanley Cup with the Leafs in 1964 and 1967, scoring the Cup-winning goal in the latter championship series, which is currently the last Cup won by the team in franchise history. After being traded to the Black Hawks, he had the best statistical season of his career in 1972–73 and reached two more Stanley Cup Final series in 1971 and 1973. He later played for the Golden Seals/Barons before retiring in 1976.

== Early life ==
Pappin was born in Copper Cliff in Greater Sudbury, Ontario, on September 10, 1939. His father, Joseph Gerard Pappin, was employed as a machinist for a mining company; his mother was Geraldine Fitzgerald. Pappin began his junior career by playing two seasons for the Toronto Marlboros of the Ontario Hockey League (OHL) from 1958 to 1960. He then joined the Sudbury Wolves in the middle of the 1959–60 season.

== Career ==
=== Rochester Americans (1960–1968) ===
Pappin began his professional hockey career in 1960 with the Rochester Americans in the American Hockey League (AHL). He played on its Calder Cup-winning teams in 1965, 1966, and 1968. He scored the most goals during the 1965 and 1966 playoffs, including the game-winning goals in the both Cup-clinching games. He went on to score 134 goals in 275 regular-season games for the Americans and was later inducted into the team's hall of fame in 1996.

=== Toronto Maple Leafs (1963–1968) ===
Pappin was added to the Toronto Maple Leafs roster during the 1963–64 season. He made his NHL debut for the franchise on November 23, 1963, against the Boston Bruins at Maple Leaf Gardens. He continued to go back and forth between the Leafs and its Rochester affiliate throughout his tenure with the franchise. He won his first Stanley Cup in 1964, and played in his first NHL All-Star Game later that year.

During the 1966–67 season, Pappin led the league in game-winning goals (7) and finished eighth in shooting percentage (15.3) and power-play goals (6). However, he had a poor relationship with general manager and coach Punch Imlach, who sent Pappin down to Rochester in February 1967 after he scored only six goals. He was recalled to Toronto after six games, around the time when Imlach temporarily stepped aside due to illness and King Clancy became interim coach. Pappin thrived with Clancy at the helm, scoring 15 goals in the last 22 games of the regular season. He went on to win his second Stanley Cup championship that same season, scoring the series-winning goal in game six. At the time of his death in 2022, it was the Leafs' most recent championship-clinching goal. Although his shot was deflected in off the skate of teammate Pete Stemkowski and credit was given to the latter at first, they privately agreed to give Pappin the goal as he was in the running for a contract bonus should he score the most goals in that year's Stanley Cup playoffs. He ultimately scored the most goals (7) and points (15), and recorded the highest shooting percentage (15.9) of any player in that series. Pappin reportedly accorded Stemkowski unlimited access to the backyard pool that he constructed with the bonus payment. Pappin was also in line for a C$1,000 bonus after scoring a combined 25 goals in the NHL and AHL, but Imlach refused to honour the agreement.

In the offseason, Imlach raised Pappin's salary to $22,000, which was $3,000 less than what the latter had requested. He appeared in his second All-Star Game in 1968, but was also sent down to the Americans again by Imlach. He was traded to the Chicago Black Hawks on May 23 that same year in exchange for Pierre Pilote. The move – which was instigated by Imlach – aggrieved Pappin and spurred him to give his 1967 championship ring to his father-in-law.

=== Chicago Black Hawks (1968–1975) ===
Pappin made a strong start with the Black Hawks, scoring six goals in his first three games and accumulating 19 goals by Christmas. He also recorded his first hat-trick in the NHL, achieving this on October 16, 1968, against the Minnesota North Stars. During his first season with the franchise, he finished fourth in the NHL in game-winning goals (7) and fifth in shooting percentage (17.7). He scored ten goals during the 1971 playoffs, helping the team advance to the Stanley Cup Final which they lost to the Montreal Canadiens in seven games. Pappin later set a franchise record by scoring two goals within six seconds against the Philadelphia Flyers on February 16, 1972.

In the 1972–73 season – arguably Pappin's best season as a professional – he recorded career-highs in goals (41), assists (51), and points (92). He finished third in the league in shooting percentage (22.5), sixth in goals, seventh in goals per game (0.54), eighth in points per game (1.21), and tenth in points. He was also named to his third All-Star Game that year. The Black Hawks reached the 1973 Stanley Cup Final on the back of Pappin's eight goals and seven assists during the playoffs, but lost to the Canadiens again. Pappin proceeded to lead the NHL in games played with 78 the following season, and was again selected to the All-Star Game that year. He played in his fifth and final All-Star Game in 1975 and posted the second-best shooting percentage (23.1) in the league that year after Peter McNab.

=== Later years ===
Pappin was traded to the California Golden Seals on June 1, 1975, in exchange for Joey Johnston. He played his final two seasons for the franchise, which relocated to Cleveland to become the Cleveland Barons in 1976. He played his final NHL game on December 11, 1976, at the age of 37. Three days later, he notified general manager Bill McCreary Sr. of his retirement.

== Post-playing career ==
After retiring from professional hockey, Pappin worked as a scout for the Black Hawks. He continued in that capacity until the middle of the 1984–85 season, when he was hired as a replacement head coach for the Milwaukee Admirals of the International Hockey League . During his tenure, the team posted a record of 12 wins and 14 losses. He subsequently returned to the Black Hawks as its director of U.S. scouting. He later scouted for the St. Louis Blues and Anaheim Ducks.

Aside from hockey, Pappin had a keen interest in harness racing and owned several standardbred horses. He also ran a tennis facility in his hometown of Sudbury. His 1967 Stanley Cup ring – which his father-in-law lost at a beach during the 1970s – was found in 2007 by treasure hunter Mark DesErmia in the Gulf of Mexico. Pappin eventually struck a deal with the treasure hunter and the ring was returned for a reward.

== Personal life ==
During the NHL offseason, Pappin operated a hockey school that also functioned as a horse-riding camp. His first marriage was to Karen Kyrzakos. Together, they had three children: Arne, Merrill, and Mary. They eventually divorced in 1982. He married Peggy two years later. He developed Bell's palsy during his time with the Black Hawks and Golden Seals.

Pappin died on June 29, 2022, at his home in Palm Desert, California. He was 82, and was diagnosed with cancer shortly before his death.

== Career statistics ==
=== Regular season and playoffs ===
			Regular season					Playoffs
Season	Team	League	GP	G	A	Pts	PIM	GP	G	A	Pts	PIM
1958–59	Toronto Marlboros	OHA	54	17	18	35	86	5	2	3	5	4
1959–60	Toronto Marlboros	OHA	48	40	34	74	126	4	3	0	3	20
1959–60	Sudbury Wolves	EPHL	4	1	0	1	4	3	0	1	1	0
1960–61	Sudbury Wolves	EPHL	46	17	20	37	74	—	—	—	—	—
1960–61	Rochester Americans	AHL	22	7	4	11	4	—	—	—	—	—
1961–62	Rochester Americans	AHL	69	28	21	49	105	2	1	0	1	2
1962–63	Rochester Americans	AHL	72	34	23	57	100	2	1	2	3	2
1963–64	Rochester Americans	AHL	16	10	6	16	16	—	—	—	—	—
1963–64	Toronto Maple Leafs	NHL	50	11	8	19	33	11	0	0	0	0
1964–65	Rochester Americans	AHL	22	14	11	25	36	10	11	5	16	32
1964–65	Toronto Maple Leafs	NHL	44	9	9	18	33	—	—	—	—	—
1965–66	Rochester Americans	AHL	63	36	51	87	116	12	8	3	11	13
1965–66	Toronto Maple Leafs	NHL	7	0	3	3	8	—	—	—	—	—
1966–67	Rochester Americans	AHL	6	4	3	7	4	—	—	—	—	—
1966–67	Toronto Maple Leafs	NHL	64	21	11	32	89	12	7	8	15	12
1967–68	Rochester Americans	AHL	5	1	5	6	16	11	2	6	8	32
1967–68	Toronto Maple Leafs	NHL	58	13	15	28	37	—	—	—	—	—
1968–69	Chicago Black Hawks	NHL	75	30	40	70	49	—	—	—	—	—
1969–70	Chicago Black Hawks	NHL	66	28	25	53	68	8	3	2	5	6
1970–71	Chicago Black Hawks	NHL	58	22	23	45	40	18	10	4	14	24
1971–72	Chicago Black Hawks	NHL	64	27	21	48	38	8	2	5	7	4
1972–73	Chicago Black Hawks	NHL	76	41	51	92	82	16	8	7	15	24
1973–74	Chicago Black Hawks	NHL	78	32	41	73	76	11	3	6	9	29
1974–75	Chicago Black Hawks	NHL	71	36	27	63	94	8	0	2	2	2
1975–76	California Golden Seals	NHL	32	6	13	19	12	—	—	—	—	—
1976–77	Cleveland Barons	NHL	24	2	8	10	12	—	—	—	—	—
NHL totals			767	278	295	573	667	92	33	34	67	101
