= 1966–67 New York Rangers season =

NHL hockey team season

1966–67 New York Rangers
- League: 4th NHL
- 1966–67 record: 30–28–12
- Home record: 18–12–5
- Road record: 12–16–7
- Goals for: 188
- Goals against: 189

Team information
- General manager: Emile Francis
- Coach: Emile Francis
- Captain: Bob Nevin
- Alternate captains: Harry Howell; Earl Ingarfield; Don Marshall
- Arena: Madison Square Garden

Team leaders
- Goals: Rod Gilbert (28)
- Assists: Phil Goyette (49)
- Points: Phil Goyette (61)
- Penalty minutes: Reggie Fleming (146)
- Wins: Ed Giacomin (30)
- Goals against average: Ed Giacomin (2.61)

The 1966–67 New York Rangers season was the franchise's 41st season. In the regular season, the Rangers finished in fourth place in the NHL with 72 points and qualified for the playoffs. New York lost in the NHL semi-finals to the Montreal Canadiens in a four-game sweep.

== Regular season ==
=== Final standings ===
Pos	Team	Pld	W	L	T	GF	GA	GD	Pts
1	Chicago Black Hawks	70	41	17	12	264	170	+94	94
2	Montreal Canadiens	70	32	25	13	202	188	+14	77
3	Toronto Maple Leafs	70	32	27	11	204	211	−7	75
4	New York Rangers	70	30	28	12	188	189	−1	72
5	Detroit Red Wings	70	27	39	4	212	241	−29	58
6	Boston Bruins	70	17	43	10	182	253	−71	44

Source: National Hockey League

=== Record vs. opponents ===
1966–67 NHL Records
Team	BOS	CHI	DET	MTL	NYR	TOR
Boston	—	2–11–1	6–6–2	5–7–2	2–8–4	2–11–1
Chicago	11–2–1	—	10–4	5–2–7	7–5–2	8–4–2
Detroit	6–6–2	4–10	—	4–10	7–7	6–6–2
Montreal	7–5–2	2–5–7	10–4	—	7–5–2	6–6–2
New York	8–2–4	5–7–2	7–7	5–7–2	—	5–5–4
Toronto	11–2–1	4–8–2	6–6–2	6–6–2	5–5–4	—

== Schedule and results ==
1966–67 regular season
October: 1–3–1 (home: 1–1–0; road: 0–2–1)

Game	October	Opponent	Score	Record
1	19	Chicago Black Hawks	6–3	0–1–0
2	22	@ Toronto Maple Leafs	4–4	0–1–1
3	23	Toronto Maple Leafs	1–0	1–1–1
4	27	@ Detroit Red Wings	5–3	1–2–1
5	29	@ Montreal Canadiens	3–0	1–3–1

November: 7–3–4 (home: 4–1–3; road: 3–2–1)

Game	November	Opponent	Score	Record
6	3	@ Boston Bruins	7–1	2–3–1
7	5	@ Toronto Maple Leafs	3–1	2–4–1
8	6	Toronto Maple Leafs	3–3	2–4–2
9	8	@ Chicago Black Hawks	3–1	2–5–2
10	9	Boston Bruins	3–3	2–5–3
11	12	@ Montreal Canadiens	6–3	3–5–3
12	13	Detroit Red Wings	5–2	4–5–3
13	16	Chicago Black Hawks	2–2	4–5–4
14	19	@ Boston Bruins	3–3	4–5–5
15	20	Montreal Canadiens	2–1	4–6–5
16	23	Boston Bruins	5–4	5–6–5
17	26	Chicago Black Hawks	4–1	6–6–5
18	27	Toronto Maple Leafs	5–0	7–6–5
19	30	@ Chicago Black Hawks	5–0	8–6–5

December: 9–4–1 (home: 5–2–0; road: 4–2–1)

Game	December	Opponent	Score	Record
20	3	@ Boston Bruins	2–2	8–6–6
21	4	Montreal Canadiens	3–1	8–7–6
22	7	Boston Bruins	4–2	9–7–6
23	8	@ Detroit Red Wings	4–2	10–7–6
24	11	Montreal Canadiens	4–2	11–7–6
25	14	Detroit Red Wings	4–1	12–7–6
26	17	@ Toronto Maple Leafs	3–1	13–7–6
27	18	@ Detroit Red Wings	5–0	13–8–6
28	21	Boston Bruins	5–1	14–8–6
29	24	@ Montreal Canadiens	4–3	15–8–6
30	25	@ Chicago Black Hawks	1–0	16–8–6
31	27	Chicago Black Hawks	3–2	16–9–6
32	29	Detroit Red Wings	4–2	17–9–6
33	31	@ Montreal Canadiens	3–0	17–10–6

January: 4–6–1 (home: 2–2–0; road: 2–4–1)

Game	January	Opponent	Score	Record
34	1	Toronto Maple Leafs	2–1	17–11–6
35	4	@ Toronto Maple Leafs	1–1	17–11–7
36	8	Montreal Canadiens	2–1	18–11–7
37	12	@ Boston Bruins	3–0	19–11–7
38	14	@ Chicago Black Hawks	5–3	19–12–7
39	15	@ Detroit Red Wings	2–0	20–12–7
40	21	@ Boston Bruins	6–2	20–13–7
41	22	@ Detroit Red Wings	7–2	20–14–7
42	25	Boston Bruins	2–1	21–14–7
43	28	@ Montreal Canadiens	3–2	21–15–7
44	29	Detroit Red Wings	4–2	21–16–7

February: 6–4–1 (home: 3–2–1; road: 3–2–0)

Game	February	Opponent	Score	Record
45	4	@ Boston Bruins	4–3	22–16–7
46	5	Toronto Maple Leafs	4–1	23–16–7
47	8	Boston Bruins	2–1	23–17–7
48	11	@ Detroit Red Wings	6–3	23–18–7
49	12	Montreal Canadiens	4–4	23–18–8
50	15	@ Toronto Maple Leafs	6–0	23–19–8
51	18	Chicago Black Hawks	4–1	24–19–8
52	19	@ Chicago Black Hawks	3–2	25–19–8
53	22	Detroit Red Wings	1–0	26–19–8
54	25	@ Montreal Canadiens	5–0	27–19–8
55	26	Toronto Maple Leafs	4–2	27–20–8

March: 3–6–4 (home: 3–3–1; road: 0–3–3)

Game	March	Opponent	Score	Record
56	1	@ Chicago Black Hawks	6–1	27–21–8
57	4	@ Boston Bruins	4–4	27–21–9
58	5	Montreal Canadiens	2–0	27–22–9
59	8	Detroit Red Wings	3–1	27–23–9
60	11	@ Toronto Maple Leafs	2–2	27–23–10
61	12	Montreal Canadiens	2–2	27–23–11
62	15	Chicago Black Hawks	3–1	27–24–11
63	18	@ Montreal Canadiens	4–2	27–25–11
64	19	Boston Bruins	3–1	28–25–11
65	22	@ Chicago Black Hawks	3–3	28–25–12
66	23	@ Detroit Red Wings	4–1	28–26–12
67	26	Toronto Maple Leafs	4–0	29–26–12
68	29	Detroit Red Wings	10–5	30–26–12

April: 0–1–1 (home: 0–1–0; road: 0–0–1)

Game	April	Opponent	Score	Record
69	1	@ Toronto Maple Leafs	5–1	30–27–12
70	2	Chicago Black Hawks	8–0	30–28–12

Legend: Win (2 points) Loss (0 points) Tie (1 point)

== Playoffs ==
1967 Stanley Cup playoffs
Semifinals vs. (2) Montreal Canadiens – Canadiens win 4–0

Game	Date	Visitor	Score	Home	OT	Series
1	April 6	New York Rangers	4–6	Montreal Canadiens		Montreal leads series 1–0
2	April 8	New York Rangers	1–3	Montreal Canadiens		Montreal leads series 2–0
3	April 11	Montreal Canadiens	3–2	New York Rangers		Montreal leads series 3–0
4	April 13	Montreal Canadiens	2–1	New York Rangers	OT	Montreal wins series 4–0

Legend: Win Loss

== Player statistics ==
Skaters

Regular season
Player	GP	G	A	Pts	PIM
Phil Goyette	70	12	49	61	6
Rod Gilbert	64	28	18	46	12
Donnie Marshall	70	24	22	46	4
Bob Nevin	67	20	24	44	6
Bernie Geoffrion	58	17	25	42	42
Harry Howell	70	12	28	40	54
Orland Kurtenbach	60	11	25	36	58
Earl Ingarfield	67	12	22	34	12
Vic Hadfield	69	13	20	33	80
Reg Fleming	61	15	16	31	146
Jim Neilson	61	4	11	15	65
Wayne Hillman	67	2	12	14	43
Arnie Brown	69	2	10	12	61
Jean Ratelle	41	6	5	11	4
Ken Schinkel	20	6	3	9	0
Bill Hicke	48	3	4	7	11
Gordon Berenson	30	0	5	5	2
Al MacNeil	58	0	4	4	44
Rod Seiling	12	1	1	2	6
Bob Plager	1	0	0	0	0
Doug Robinson	1	0	0	0	0
Jim Johnson	2	0	0	0	0
Larry Mickey	8	0	0	0	0

Playoffs
Player	GP	G	A	Pts	PIM
Rod Gilbert	4	2	2	4	6
Bob Nevin	4	0	3	3	2
Reg Fleming	4	0	2	2	11
Orland Kurtenbach	3	0	2	2	0
Bernie Geoffrion	4	2	0	2	0
Gordon Berenson	4	0	1	1	2
Ken Schinkel	4	0	1	1	0
Jim Neilson	4	1	0	1	0
Vic Hadfield	4	1	0	1	17
Earl Ingarfield	4	1	0	1	2
Donnie Marshall	4	0	1	1	2
Phil Goyette	4	1	0	1	0
Al MacNeil	4	0	0	0	2
Jean Ratelle	4	0	0	0	2
Arnie Brown	4	0	0	0	6
Wayne Hillman	4	0	0	0	2
Harry Howell	4	0	0	0	4

Goaltenders

Regular season
Player	GP	TOI	W	L	T	GA	GAA	SO
Ed Giacomin	68	3981	30	27	11	173	2.61	9
Cesare Maniago	6	219	0	1	1	14	3.84	0

Playoffs
Player	GP	TOI	W	L	GA	GAA	SO
Ed Giacomin	4	246	0	4	14	3.41	0

^{†}Denotes player spent time with another team before joining Rangers. Stats reflect time with Rangers only.
^{‡}Traded mid-season. Stats reflect time with Rangers only.

Note:

Pos = Position;GP = Games played; G = Goals; A = Assists; Pts = Points; PIM = Penalty minutes; +/- = Plus/minus; PPG = Power-play goals; SHG = Short-handed goals; GWG = Game-winning goals
Pos = Position;GP = Games played; Min, TOI = Minutes played; W = Wins; L = Losses; T,T/OT = Ties; OTL = Overtime losses; GA = Goals-against; GAA = Goals-against average; SO = Shutouts; SA = Shots against; SV = Shots saved;SV% = Save percentage;

== Draft picks ==
New York's picks at the 1966 NHL amateur draft in Montreal, Canada.

Round	#	Player	Position	Nationality	College/Junior/Club team (League)
1	2	Brad Park	D	Canada	Toronto Marlboros (OHA)
2	8	Joey Johnston	LW	Canada	Peterborough Petes (OHA)
3	14	Don Luce	C	Canada	Kitchener Rangers (OHA)
4	20	Jack Egers	RW	Canada	Kitchener (Junior B)

== See also ==
- 1966–67 NHL season
