= 1966–67 Detroit Red Wings season =

Sports season

1966–67 Detroit Red Wings
- League: 5th NHL
- 1966–67 record: 27–39–4
- Home record: 21–11–3
- Road record: 6–28–1
- Goals for: 212
- Goals against: 241

Team information
- General manager: Sid Abel
- Coach: Sid Abel
- Captain: Alex Delvecchio
- Alternate captains: Leo Boivin; Norm Ullman
- Arena: Detroit Olympia

Team leaders
- Goals: Bruce MacGregor (28)
- Assists: Norm Ullman (44)
- Points: Norm Ullman (70)
- Penalty minutes: Gary Bergman (129)
- Wins: Roger Crozier (22)
- Goals against average: Roger Crozier (3.35)

The 1966–67 Detroit Red Wings season saw the Red Wings finish in fifth place in the National Hockey League (NHL) with a record of 27 wins, 39 losses, and 4 ties for 58 points. The season would mark the beginning of a downfall for the once mighty Red Wings, over the next twenty seasons between 1967 and 1986, the Red Wings would make the playoffs only four times (1970, 1978, 1984, 1985) winning only one playoff series (1978). The team would miss the playoffs for the first time since the 1961–62 season

== Regular season ==
=== Final standings ===
Pos	Team	Pld	W	L	T	GF	GA	GD	Pts
1	Chicago Black Hawks	70	41	17	12	264	170	+94	94
2	Montreal Canadiens	70	32	25	13	202	188	+14	77
3	Toronto Maple Leafs	70	32	27	11	204	211	−7	75
4	New York Rangers	70	30	28	12	188	189	−1	72
5	Detroit Red Wings	70	27	39	4	212	241	−29	58
6	Boston Bruins	70	17	43	10	182	253	−71	44

Source: National Hockey League

=== Record vs. opponents ===
1966–67 NHL Records
Team	BOS	CHI	DET	MTL	NYR	TOR
Boston	—	2–11–1	6–6–2	5–7–2	2–8–4	2–11–1
Chicago	11–2–1	—	10–4	5–2–7	7–5–2	8–4–2
Detroit	6–6–2	4–10	—	4–10	7–7	6–6–2
Montreal	7–5–2	2–5–7	10–4	—	7–5–2	6–6–2
New York	8–2–4	5–7–2	7–7	5–7–2	—	5–5–4
Toronto	11–2–1	4–8–2	6–6–2	6–6–2	5–5–4	—

== Schedule and results ==
1966–67 regular season
October

Game	Result	Date	Score	Opponent	Record
1	L	October 19, 1966	2–6	@ Boston Bruins (1966–67)	0–1–0
2	L	October 22, 1966	4–7	Chicago Black Hawks (1966–67)	0–2–0
3	L	October 23, 1966	1–4	@ Chicago Black Hawks (1966–67)	0–3–0
4	L	October 26, 1966	2–3	@ Toronto Maple Leafs (1966–67)	0–4–0
5	W	October 27, 1966	5–3	New York Rangers (1966–67)	1–4–0
6	W	October 30, 1966	8–1	Boston Bruins (1966–67)	2–4–0

November

Game	Result	Date	Score	Opponent	Record
7	T	November 3, 1966	2–2	Toronto Maple Leafs (1966–67)	2–4–1
8	L	November 5, 1966	1–3	@ Montreal Canadiens (1966–67)	2–5–1
9	W	November 6, 1966	6–0	Montreal Canadiens (1966–67)	3–5–1
10	W	November 10, 1966	3–0	Chicago Black Hawks (1966–67)	4–5–1
11	T	November 12, 1966	3–3	Toronto Maple Leafs (1966–67)	4–5–2
12	L	November 13, 1966	2–5	@ New York Rangers (1966–67)	4–6–2
13	L	November 19, 1966	2–7	@ Chicago Black Hawks (1966–67)	4–7–2
14	L	November 20, 1966	2–5	@ Boston Bruins (1966–67)	4–8–2
15	L	November 22, 1966	0–3	Montreal Canadiens (1966–67)	4–9–2
16	L	November 24, 1966	3–8	@ Boston Bruins (1966–67)	4–10–2
17	L	November 26, 1966	1–3	@ Montreal Canadiens (1966–67)	4–11–2

December

Game	Result	Date	Score	Opponent	Record
18	W	December 1, 1966	4–1	Boston Bruins (1966–67)	5–11–2
19	L	December 3, 1966	2–5	@ Toronto Maple Leafs (1966–67)	5–12–2
20	L	December 4, 1966	1–4	@ Chicago Black Hawks (1966–67)	5–13–2
21	L	December 8, 1966	2–4	New York Rangers (1966–67)	5–14–2
22	L	December 10, 1966	1–5	@ Montreal Canadiens (1966–67)	5–15–2
23	W	December 11, 1966	4–1	Toronto Maple Leafs (1966–67)	6–15–2
24	L	December 14, 1966	1–4	@ New York Rangers (1966–67)	6–16–2
25	W	December 15, 1966	4–0	Boston Bruins (1966–67)	7–16–2
26	W	December 18, 1966	5–0	New York Rangers (1966–67)	8–16–2
27	L	December 21, 1966	4–6	@ Chicago Black Hawks (1966–67)	8–17–2
28	L	December 25, 1966	0–4	Montreal Canadiens (1966–67)	8–18–2
29	T	December 27, 1966	4–4	@ Boston Bruins (1966–67)	8–18–3
30	L	December 29, 1966	2–4	@ New York Rangers (1966–67)	8–19–3
31	W	December 31, 1966	3–1	Boston Bruins (1966–67)	9–19–3

January

Game	Result	Date	Score	Opponent	Record
32	W	January 1, 1967	4–1	Montreal Canadiens (1966–67)	10–19–3
33	W	January 5, 1967	6–4	Chicago Black Hawks (1966–67)	11–19–3
34	L	January 7, 1967	3–4	@ Montreal Canadiens (1966–67)	11–20–3
35	W	January 8, 1967	3–1	Toronto Maple Leafs (1966–67)	12–20–3
36	L	January 11, 1967	1–6	@ Chicago Black Hawks (1966–67)	12–21–3
37	W	January 12, 1967	4–1	Chicago Black Hawks (1966–67)	13–21–3
38	L	January 14, 1967	2–5	@ Toronto Maple Leafs (1966–67)	13–22–3
39	L	January 15, 1967	0–2	New York Rangers (1966–67)	13–23–3
40	W	January 19, 1967	6–2	Toronto Maple Leafs (1966–67)	14–23–3
41	W	January 21, 1967	5–4	@ Toronto Maple Leafs (1966–67)	15–23–3
42	W	January 22, 1967	7–2	New York Rangers (1966–67)	16–23–3
43	L	January 26, 1967	3–4	Chicago Black Hawks (1966–67)	16–24–3
44	W	January 29, 1967	4–2	@ New York Rangers (1966–67)	17–24–3

February

Game	Result	Date	Score	Opponent	Record
45	W	February 2, 1967	4–3	Boston Bruins (1966–67)	18–24–3
46	W	February 5, 1967	6–1	Montreal Canadiens (1966–67)	19–24–3
47	W	February 8, 1967	5–2	@ Toronto Maple Leafs (1966–67)	20–24–3
48	W	February 11, 1967	6–3	New York Rangers (1966–67)	21–24–3
49	L	February 12, 1967	2–3	@ Chicago Black Hawks (1966–67)	21–25–3
50	L	February 14, 1967	3–6	@ Boston Bruins (1966–67)	21–26–3
51	L	February 16, 1967	1–5	Chicago Black Hawks (1966–67)	21–27–3
52	L	February 18, 1967	2–3	@ Montreal Canadiens (1966–67)	21–28–3
53	W	February 19, 1967	3–1	Montreal Canadiens (1966–67)	22–28–3
54	L	February 22, 1967	0–1	@ New York Rangers (1966–67)	22–29–3
55	L	February 23, 1967	2–4	Toronto Maple Leafs (1966–67)	22–30–3
56	L	February 25, 1967	0–4	@ Toronto Maple Leafs (1966–67)	22–31–3
57	T	February 26, 1967	3–3	Boston Bruins (1966–67)	22–31–4

March

Game	Result	Date	Score	Opponent	Record
58	L	March 4, 1967	2–6	@ Montreal Canadiens (1966–67)	22–32–4
59	W	March 5, 1967	5–3	@ Boston Bruins (1966–67)	23–32–4
60	W	March 8, 1967	3–1	@ New York Rangers (1966–67)	24–32–4
61	L	March 12, 1967	3–7	@ Boston Bruins (1966–67)	24–33–4
62	W	March 15, 1967	4–2	@ Toronto Maple Leafs (1966–67)	25–33–4
63	L	March 18, 1967	3–5	Boston Bruins (1966–67)	25–34–4
64	L	March 19, 1967	5–6	Toronto Maple Leafs (1966–67)	25–35–4
65	W	March 23, 1967	4–1	New York Rangers (1966–67)	26–35–4
66	L	March 25, 1967	1–4	@ Montreal Canadiens (1966–67)	26–36–4
67	W	March 26, 1967	4–2	Chicago Black Hawks (1966–67)	27–36–4
68	L	March 28, 1967	2–7	@ Chicago Black Hawks (1966–67)	27–37–4
69	L	March 29, 1967	5–10	@ New York Rangers (1966–67)	27–38–4

April

Game	Result	Date	Score	Opponent	Record
70	L	April 2, 1967	2–4	Montreal Canadiens (1966–67)	27–39–4

Legend: Win (2 points) Loss (0 points) Tie (1 point)

== Player statistics ==
=== Regular season ===
Scoring

Player	Pos	GP	G	A	Pts	PIM	PPG	SHG	GWG
Norm Ullman	C	68	26	44	70	26	5	1	3
Gordie Howe	RW	69	25	40	65	53	8	1	1
Alex Delvecchio	C/LW	70	17	38	55	10	4	1	2
Ted Hampson	C	65	13	35	48	4	1	0	2
Bruce MacGregor	C	70	28	19	47	14	8	1	4
Dean Prentice	LW	68	23	22	45	18	5	1	1
Paul Henderson	RW	46	21	19	40	10	6	1	5
Gary Bergman	D	70	5	30	35	129	1	0	1
Andy Bathgate	RW	60	8	23	31	24	0	0	1
Floyd Smith	RW	54	11	14	25	8	6	0	0
Leo Boivin	D	69	4	17	21	78	0	0	1
Howie Young	D/RW	44	3	14	17	100	0	0	1
Ray Cullen	C	27	8	8	16	8	0	0	1
Bert Marshall	D	57	0	10	10	68	0	0	0
Parker MacDonald	C	16	3	5	8	2	1	0	3
Pete Goegan	D	31	2	6	8	12	1	0	0
Murray Hall	RW	12	4	3	7	4	0	0	0
Doug Roberts	RW	13	3	1	4	0	0	0	1
Bob Wall	D	31	2	2	4	26	0	0	0
Pete Mahovlich	C	34	1	3	4	16	0	0	0
Bob McCord	D	14	1	2	3	27	0	0	0
Ab McDonald	LW	12	2	0	2	2	0	0	0
Bob Falkenberg	D	16	1	1	2	10	0	0	0
Val Fonteyne	LW	28	1	1	2	0	0	0	0
Bryan Watson	D	48	0	1	1	66	0	0	0
Gerry Abel	LW	1	0	0	0	0	0	0	0
Hank Bassen	G	8	0	0	0	0	0	0	0
Craig Cameron	RW	1	0	0	0	0	0	0	0
Bart Crashley	D	2	0	0	0	2	0	0	0
Roger Crozier	G	58	0	0	0	2	0	0	0
George Gardner	G	11	0	0	0	0	0	0	0
Warren Godfrey	D	2	0	0	0	0	0	0	0
Doug Harvey	D	2	0	0	0	0	0	0	0
Gary Jarrett	LW	4	0	0	0	0	0	0	0
Real Lemieux	LW	1	0	0	0	0	0	0	0
Jimmy Peters	C	2	0	0	0	0	0	0	0
Dave Rochefort	C	1	0	0	0	0	0	0	0
Ted Taylor	LW	2	0	0	0	0	0	0	0

Goaltending

Player	MIN	GP	W	L	T	GA	GAA	SO
Roger Crozier	3256	58	22	29	4	182	3.35	4
George Gardner	560	11	3	6	0	36	3.86	0
Hank Bassen	384	8	2	4	0	22	3.44	0
Team:	4200	70	27	39	4	240	3.43	4

Note: GP = Games played; G = Goals; A = Assists; Pts = Points; +/- = Plus-minus PIM = Penalty minutes; PPG = Power-play goals; SHG = Short-handed goals; GWG = Game-winning goals;
MIN = Minutes played; W = Wins; L = Losses; T = Ties; GA = Goals against; GAA = Goals-against average; SO = Shutouts;

== Draft picks ==
Detroit's draft picks at the 1966 NHL amateur draft held at the Mount Royal Hotel in Montreal.

Round	#	Player	Nationality	College/Junior/Club team (League)
1	6	Steve Atkinson	Canada	Niagara Falls Flyers (OHA)
2	12	Jim Whittaker	Canada	Oshawa Generals (OHA)
3	18	Lee Carpenter	Canada	Hamilton Red Wings (OHA)
4	24	Grant Cole	Canada	St. Michael's Buzzers (OHA)

== See also ==
- 1966–67 NHL season
