= 1966–67 Chicago Black Hawks season =

National Hockey League team season

1966–67 Chicago Black Hawks
- Prince of Wales Trophy winners
- League: 1st NHL
- 1966–67 record: 41–17–12
- Home record: 24–5–6
- Road record: 17–12–6
- Goals for: 264
- Goals against: 170

Team information
- General manager: Tommy Ivan
- Coach: Billy Reay
- Captain: Pierre Pilote
- Alternate captains: Bobby Hull; Stan Mikita
- Arena: Chicago Stadium

Team leaders
- Goals: Bobby Hull (52)
- Assists: Stan Mikita (62)
- Points: Stan Mikita (97)
- Penalty minutes: Ed Van Impe (111)
- Wins: Denis DeJordy (22)
- Goals against average: Glenn Hall (2.38)

The 1966–67 Chicago Black Hawks season was the Hawks' 41st season in the National Hockey League (NHL). Heading into the season, Chicago was coming off a team record 37 victories in the 1965–66 season, as they finished in second place in the league. The Black Hawks managed to top this win total in 1966–67, securing 41 victories and the Prince of Wales Trophy for finishing in first place overall in the NHL. However, the Hawks were then upset by the third-place Toronto Maple Leafs in the NHL semi-finals, losing in six games.

Chicago started the season very strong, leading the NHL with a record of 8–2–2 in their first 12 games, and continued their winning ways all season long. The Black Hawks finished the season with a club record in wins with 41, and points with 94, as Chicago finished in first place for the first time in team history. The Hawks were 17 points better than the second place Montreal Canadiens, and heavy favorites to win their second Stanley Cup of the decade.

Offensively, the Hawks were led by Stan Mikita, who led the NHL with 97 points, winning the Art Ross Trophy, Hart Memorial Trophy, and the Lady Byng Trophy. His 97 points tied the NHL record, set by teammate Bobby Hull in the 1965–66 season. Hull recorded his second straight 50+ goal season, as he scored 52 goals, and added 28 assists to finish second in the league with 80 points. Kenny Wharram finished fourth in league scoring, as he scored 31 goals and 65 points, while Phil Esposito and Doug Mohns were not far behind, earning 61 and 60 points respectively. Team captain Pierre Pilote anchored the blueline, scoring 6 goals and 52 points. Fellow defenseman Ed Van Impe led the team with 111 penalty minutes.

In goal, Denis DeJordy earned the majority of playing time, as he won a team high 22 games, while posting a 2.46 GAA and 4 shutouts. Glenn Hall had his playing time cut back, however, he had a very solid season, winning 19 games, while having a team best 2.38 GAA, and earning 2 shutouts. DeJordy and Hull earned the Vezina Trophy as the Hawks allowed the fewest goals against in the league.

The Hawks opened the playoffs against the Toronto Maple Leafs. The Leafs finished the season in third place, as they had a record of 32–27–11, earning 75 points, 19 fewer than the Black Hawks. The series opened with two games at Chicago Stadium, and the Hawks had an easy time defeating Toronto in the series opener, with a 5–2 victory, however, the Leafs stormed back in the second game, beating Chicago 3–1 to even the series up. The series shifted to Maple Leaf Gardens for the next two games, and the teams once again split the games, as Toronto won the third game by a 3–1 score, and Chicago took the fourth game, holding off the Leafs for a 4–3 win. Game 5 returned to Chicago, however, Toronto took a 3–2 series lead, beating Chicago 4–2. Game 6 was played in Toronto, and the Maple Leafs completed the upset, winning the game 3–1 to advance to the Stanley Cup finals, and end Chicago's season.

== Offseason ==
=== Draft picks ===
Chicago's draft picks at the 1966 NHL amateur draft held at the Mount Royal Hotel in Montreal, Quebec.

Round	#	Player	Nationality	College/Junior/Club team (League)
1	3	Terry Caffery	Canada	Toronto Marlboros (OHA)
2	9	Ron Dussiaume	Canada	Oshawa Generals (OHA)
3	15	Larry Gibbons	Canada	Markham Seal-a-Wax (Junior B)
4	21	Brian Morenz	Canada	Oshawa Generals (OHA)

== Season standings ==
Pos	Team	Pld	W	L	T	GF	GA	GD	Pts
1	Chicago Black Hawks	70	41	17	12	264	170	+94	94
2	Montreal Canadiens	70	32	25	13	202	188	+14	77
3	Toronto Maple Leafs	70	32	27	11	204	211	−7	75
4	New York Rangers	70	30	28	12	188	189	−1	72
5	Detroit Red Wings	70	27	39	4	212	241	−29	58
6	Boston Bruins	70	17	43	10	182	253	−71	44

Source: National Hockey League

=== Record vs. opponents ===
1966–67 NHL Records
Team	BOS	CHI	DET	MTL	NYR	TOR
Boston	—	2–11–1	6–6–2	5–7–2	2–8–4	2–11–1
Chicago	11–2–1	—	10–4	5–2–7	7–5–2	8–4–2
Detroit	6–6–2	4–10	—	4–10	7–7	6–6–2
Montreal	7–5–2	2–5–7	10–4	—	7–5–2	6–6–2
New York	8–2–4	5–7–2	7–7	5–7–2	—	5–5–4
Toronto	11–2–1	4–8–2	6–6–2	6–6–2	5–5–4	—

== Schedule and results ==
=== Regular season ===
1966–67 regular season
October

Game	Date	Visitor	Score	Home	Record	Points
1	October 19	Chicago Black Hawks	6–3	New York Rangers	1–0–0	2
2	October 22	Chicago Black Hawks	7–4	Detroit Red Wings	2–0–0	4
3	October 23	Detroit Red Wings	1–4	Chicago Black Hawks	3–0–0	6
4	October 26	Chicago Black Hawks	5–3	Montreal Canadiens	4–0–0	8

November

Game	Date	Visitor	Score	Home	Record	Points
5	November 1	Boston Bruins	3–2	Chicago Black Hawks	4–1–0	8
6	November 6	Chicago Black Hawks	4–2	Boston Bruins	5–1–0	10
7	November 8	New York Rangers	1–3	Chicago Black Hawks	6–1–0	12
8	November 10	Chicago Black Hawks	0–3	Detroit Red Wings	6–2–0	12
9	November 13	Toronto Maple Leafs	1–6	Chicago Black Hawks	7–2–0	14
10	November 16	Chicago Black Hawks	2–2	New York Rangers	7–2–1	15
11	November 19	Detroit Red Wings	2–7	Chicago Black Hawks	8–2–1	17
12	November 20	Toronto Maple Leafs	2–2	Chicago Black Hawks	8–2–2	18
13	November 23	Chicago Black Hawks	3–6	Toronto Maple Leafs	8–3–2	18
14	November 24	Montreal Canadiens	0–5	Chicago Black Hawks	9–3–2	20
15	November 26	Chicago Black Hawks	1–4	New York Rangers	9–4–2	20
16	November 27	Chicago Black Hawks	5–4	Boston Bruins	10–4–2	22
17	November 30	New York Rangers	5–0	Chicago Black Hawks	10–5–2	22

December

Game	Date	Visitor	Score	Home	Record	Points
18	December 3	Chicago Black Hawks	1–3	Montreal Canadiens	10–6–2	22
19	December 4	Detroit Red Wings	1–4	Chicago Black Hawks	11–6–2	24
20	December 8	Chicago Black Hawks	10–2	Boston Bruins	12–6–2	26
21	December 10	Chicago Black Hawks	3–5	Toronto Maple Leafs	12–7–2	26
22	December 11	Boston Bruins	2–2	Chicago Black Hawks	12–7–3	27
23	December 14	Montreal Canadiens	1–2	Chicago Black Hawks	13–7–3	29
24	December 17	Chicago Black Hawks	4–4	Montreal Canadiens	13–7–4	30
25	December 18	Toronto Maple Leafs	1–3	Chicago Black Hawks	14–7–4	32
26	December 21	Detroit Red Wings	4–6	Chicago Black Hawks	15–7–4	34
27	December 25	New York Rangers	1–0	Chicago Black Hawks	15–8–4	34
28	December 27	Chicago Black Hawks	3–2	New York Rangers	16–8–4	36
29	December 31	Chicago Black Hawks	5–1	Toronto Maple Leafs	17–8–4	38

January

Game	Date	Visitor	Score	Home	Record	Points
30	January 1	Boston Bruins	2–3	Chicago Black Hawks	18–8–4	40
31	January 4	Montreal Canadiens	2–2	Chicago Black Hawks	18–8–5	41
32	January 5	Chicago Black Hawks	4–6	Detroit Red Wings	18–9–5	41
33	January 8	Boston Bruins	3–1	Chicago Black Hawks	18–10–5	41
34	January 11	Detroit Red Wings	1–6	Chicago Black Hawks	19–10–5	43
35	January 12	Chicago Black Hawks	1–4	Detroit Red Wings	19–11–5	43
36	January 14	New York Rangers	3–5	Chicago Black Hawks	20–11–5	45
37	January 15	Toronto Maple Leafs	0–4	Chicago Black Hawks	21–11–5	47
38	January 19	Chicago Black Hawks	4–2	Boston Bruins	22–11–5	49
39	January 21	Chicago Black Hawks	3–3	Montreal Canadiens	22–11–6	50
40	January 22	Montreal Canadiens	1–4	Chicago Black Hawks	23–11–6	52
41	January 26	Chicago Black Hawks	4–3	Detroit Red Wings	24–11–6	54
42	January 28	Chicago Black Hawks	5–2	Toronto Maple Leafs	25–11–6	56
43	January 29	Toronto Maple Leafs	1–5	Chicago Black Hawks	26–11–6	58

February

Game	Date	Visitor	Score	Home	Record	Points
44	February 1	Boston Bruins	1–6	Chicago Black Hawks	27–11–6	60
45	February 4	Chicago Black Hawks	3–3	Montreal Canadiens	27–11–7	61
46	February 5	Chicago Black Hawks	5–0	Boston Bruins	28–11–7	63
47	February 8	Montreal Canadiens	0–5	Chicago Black Hawks	29–11–7	65
48	February 11	Chicago Black Hawks	4–4	Toronto Maple Leafs	29–11–8	66
49	February 12	Detroit Red Wings	2–3	Chicago Black Hawks	30–11–8	68
50	February 16	Chicago Black Hawks	5–1	Detroit Red Wings	31–11–8	70
51	February 18	Chicago Black Hawks	1–4	New York Rangers	31–12–8	70
52	February 19	New York Rangers	3–2	Chicago Black Hawks	31–13–8	70
53	February 25	Boston Bruins	3–6	Chicago Black Hawks	32–13–8	72
54	February 26	Montreal Canadiens	2–2	Chicago Black Hawks	32–13–9	73

March

Game	Date	Visitor	Score	Home	Record	Points
55	March 1	New York Rangers	1–6	Chicago Black Hawks	33–13–9	75
56	March 2	Chicago Black Hawks	5–2	Boston Bruins	34–13–9	77
57	March 4	Chicago Black Hawks	0–3	Toronto Maple Leafs	34–14–9	77
58	March 5	Toronto Maple Leafs	2–5	Chicago Black Hawks	35–14–9	79
59	March 8	Boston Bruins	1–3	Chicago Black Hawks	36–14–9	81
60	March 11	Chicago Black Hawks	3–3	Montreal Canadiens	36–14–10	82
61	March 12	Toronto Maple Leafs	0–5	Chicago Black Hawks	37–14–10	84
62	March 15	Chicago Black Hawks	3–1	New York Rangers	38–14–10	86
63	March 18	Chicago Black Hawks	5–9	Toronto Maple Leafs	38–15–10	86
64	March 19	Montreal Canadiens	4–4	Chicago Black Hawks	38–15–11	87
65	March 22	New York Rangers	3–3	Chicago Black Hawks	38–15–12	88
66	March 26	Chicago Black Hawks	2–4	Detroit Red Wings	38–16–12	88
67	March 28	Detroit Red Wings	2–7	Chicago Black Hawks	39–16–12	90
68	March 30	Chicago Black Hawks	3–1	Boston Bruins	40–16–12	92

April

Game	Date	Visitor	Score	Home	Record	Points
69	April 1	Chicago Black Hawks	4–5	Montreal Canadiens	40–17–12	92
70	April 2	Chicago Black Hawks	8–0	New York Rangers	41–17–12	94

Legend: Win (2 points) Loss (0 points) Tie (1 point)

=== Playoffs ===
1967 Stanley Cup playoffs
Semifinals vs. (3) Toronto Maple Leafs – Maple Leafs win 4–2

Game	Date	Visitor	Score	Home	Series
1	April 6	Toronto Maple Leafs	2–5	Chicago Black Hawks	1–0
2	April 9	Toronto Maple Leafs	3–1	Chicago Black Hawks	1–1
3	April 11	Chicago Black Hawks	1–3	Toronto Maple Leafs	1–2
4	April 13	Chicago Black Hawks	4–3	Toronto Maple Leafs	2–2
5	April 15	Toronto Maple Leafs	4–2	Chicago Black Hawks	2–3
6	April 18	Chicago Black Hawks	1–3	Toronto Maple Leafs	2–4

Legend: Win Loss

== Playoff stats ==
=== Scoring leaders ===
Player	GP	G	A	Pts	PIM
Bobby Hull	6	4	2	6	0
Pierre Pilote	6	2	4	6	6
Doug Mohns	5	0	5	5	8
Kenny Wharram	6	2	2	4	2
Stan Mikita	6	2	2	4	2

=== Goaltending ===
Player	GP	TOI	W	L	GA	SO	GAA
Glenn Hall	3	176	1	2	8	0	2.73
Denis DeJordy	4	184	1	2	10	0	3.26
