= 1966–67 Boston Bruins season =

NHL team season

1966–67 Boston Bruins
- League: 6th NHL
- 1966–67 record: 17–43–10
- Home record: 10–21–4
- Road record: 7–22–6
- Goals for: 182
- Goals against: 253

Team information
- General manager: Hap Emms
- Coach: Harry Sinden
- Captain: Johnny Bucyk
- Arena: Boston Garden

Team leaders
- Goals: Pit Martin (20)
- Assists: Johnny Bucyk (30)
- Points: Johnny Bucyk (48)
- Penalty minutes: Gilles Marotte (112)
- Wins: Eddie Johnston (8)
- Goals against average: Gerry Cheevers (3.33)

The 1966–67 Boston Bruins season was the Bruins' 43rd season in the NHL. Despite the debut of Bobby Orr, the Bruins finished in last place and did not qualify for the playoffs for the eighth consecutive season for the first time in franchise history. It was the last time the team would miss the playoffs until the 1996–97 season, as they would embark on a streak of 29 straight seasons in the playoffs the next season.

== Offseason ==
=== NHL draft ===
Round	Overall	Player	Nationality	Position
1	1	Barry Gibbs	Canada	Defenceman
2	7	Rick Smith	Canada	Defenceman
3	13	Garnet Bailey	Canada	Left wing
4	19	Tom Webster	Canada	Right wing

== Regular season ==
- Bobby Orr made his NHL debut October 19, with an assist in a 6–2 win over Detroit.

=== Bobby Orr ===
In his first professional season—despite missing nine games with a knee injury—he won the Calder Memorial Trophy as the league's outstanding rookie and, while the Bruins finished in last place that season, sparked a renaissance that propelled the Bruins to make the playoffs the following twenty-nine straight seasons. New York Rangers defenseman Harry Howell, the winner of the Norris Trophy as the league's best defenseman in Orr's rookie year, famously predicted that he was glad to win when he did, because "Orr will own this trophy from now on."

=== Season standings ===
Pos	Team	Pld	W	L	T	GF	GA	GD	Pts
1	Chicago Black Hawks	70	41	17	12	264	170	+94	94
2	Montreal Canadiens	70	32	25	13	202	188	+14	77
3	Toronto Maple Leafs	70	32	27	11	204	211	−7	75
4	New York Rangers	70	30	28	12	188	189	−1	72
5	Detroit Red Wings	70	27	39	4	212	241	−29	58
6	Boston Bruins	70	17	43	10	182	253	−71	44

Source: National Hockey League

=== Record vs. opponents ===
1966–67 NHL Records
Team	BOS	CHI	DET	MTL	NYR	TOR
Boston	—	2–11–1	6–6–2	5–7–2	2–8–4	2–11–1
Chicago	11–2–1	—	10–4	5–2–7	7–5–2	8–4–2
Detroit	6–6–2	4–10	—	4–10	7–7	6–6–2
Montreal	7–5–2	2–5–7	10–4	—	7–5–2	6–6–2
New York	8–2–4	5–7–2	7–7	5–7–2	—	5–5–4
Toronto	11–2–1	4–8–2	6–6–2	6–6–2	5–5–4	—

== Schedule and results ==
1966–67 regular season
October

Game	Result	Date	Score	Opponent	Record
1	W	October 19, 1966	6–2	Detroit Red Wings (1966–67)	1–0–0
2	L	October 22, 1966	1–3	@ Montreal Canadiens (1966–67)	1–1–0
3	L	October 23, 1966	2–3	Montreal Canadiens (1966–67)	1–2–0
4	T	October 29, 1966	3–3	@ Toronto Maple Leafs (1966–67)	1–2–1
5	L	October 30, 1966	1–8	@ Detroit Red Wings (1966–67)	1–3–1

November

Game	Result	Date	Score	Opponent	Record
6	W	November 1, 1966	3–2	@ Chicago Black Hawks (1966–67)	2–3–1
7	L	November 3, 1966	1–7	New York Rangers (1966–67)	2–4–1
8	L	November 6, 1966	2–4	Chicago Black Hawks (1966–67)	2–5–1
9	T	November 9, 1966	3–3	@ New York Rangers (1966–67)	2–5–2
10	W	November 10, 1966	4–0	Toronto Maple Leafs (1966–67)	3–5–2
11	W	November 13, 1966	2–1	Montreal Canadiens (1966–67)	4–5–2
12	T	November 19, 1966	3–3	New York Rangers (1966–67)	4–5–3
13	W	November 20, 1966	5–2	Detroit Red Wings (1966–67)	5–5–3
14	L	November 23, 1966	4–5	@ New York Rangers (1966–67)	5–6–3
15	W	November 24, 1966	8–3	Detroit Red Wings (1966–67)	6–6–3
16	L	November 26, 1966	2–4	@ Toronto Maple Leafs (1966–67)	6–7–3
17	L	November 27, 1966	4–5	Chicago Black Hawks (1966–67)	6–8–3

December

Game	Result	Date	Score	Opponent	Record
18	L	December 1, 1966	1–4	@ Detroit Red Wings (1966–67)	6–9–3
19	T	December 3, 1966	2–2	New York Rangers (1966–67)	6–9–4
20	L	December 4, 1966	3–8	Toronto Maple Leafs (1966–67)	6–10–4
21	L	December 7, 1966	2–4	@ New York Rangers (1966–67)	6–11–4
22	L	December 8, 1966	2–10	Chicago Black Hawks (1966–67)	6–12–4
23	T	December 11, 1966	2–2	@ Chicago Black Hawks (1966–67)	6–12–5
24	L	December 14, 1966	1–2	@ Toronto Maple Leafs (1966–67)	6–13–5
25	L	December 15, 1966	0–4	@ Detroit Red Wings (1966–67)	6–14–5
26	W	December 18, 1966	3–1	Montreal Canadiens (1966–67)	7–14–5
27	L	December 21, 1966	1–5	@ New York Rangers (1966–67)	7–15–5
28	L	December 24, 1966	0–3	@ Toronto Maple Leafs (1966–67)	7–16–5
29	L	December 25, 1966	2–4	Toronto Maple Leafs (1966–67)	7–17–5
30	T	December 27, 1966	4–4	Detroit Red Wings (1966–67)	7–17–6
31	T	December 28, 1966	1–1	@ Montreal Canadiens (1966–67)	7–17–7
32	L	December 31, 1966	1–3	@ Detroit Red Wings (1966–67)	7–18–7

January

Game	Result	Date	Score	Opponent	Record
33	L	January 1, 1967	2–3	@ Chicago Black Hawks (1966–67)	7–19–7
34	L	January 7, 1967	2–5	@ Toronto Maple Leafs (1966–67)	7–20–7
35	W	January 8, 1967	3–1	@ Chicago Black Hawks (1966–67)	8–20–7
36	L	January 12, 1967	0–3	New York Rangers (1966–67)	8–21–7
37	W	January 14, 1967	5–4	@ Montreal Canadiens (1966–67)	9–21–7
38	L	January 15, 1967	1–3	Montreal Canadiens (1966–67)	9–22–7
39	L	January 19, 1967	2–4	Chicago Black Hawks (1966–67)	9–23–7
40	W	January 21, 1967	6–2	New York Rangers (1966–67)	10–23–7
41	W	January 22, 1967	3–1	Toronto Maple Leafs (1966–67)	11–23–7
42	L	January 25, 1967	1–2	@ New York Rangers (1966–67)	11–24–7
43	W	January 26, 1967	4–1	@ Montreal Canadiens (1966–67)	12–24–7
44	L	January 29, 1967	2–3	Montreal Canadiens (1966–67)	12–25–7

February

Game	Result	Date	Score	Opponent	Record
45	L	February 1, 1967	1–6	@ Chicago Black Hawks (1966–67)	12–26–7
46	L	February 2, 1967	3–4	@ Detroit Red Wings (1966–67)	12–27–7
47	L	February 4, 1967	3–4	New York Rangers (1966–67)	12–28–7
48	L	February 5, 1967	0–5	Chicago Black Hawks (1966–67)	12–29–7
49	W	February 8, 1967	2–1	@ New York Rangers (1966–67)	13–29–7
50	L	February 11, 1967	3–4	Montreal Canadiens (1966–67)	13–30–7
51	L	February 12, 1967	1–2	Toronto Maple Leafs (1966–67)	13–31–7
52	W	February 14, 1967	6–3	Detroit Red Wings (1966–67)	14–31–7
53	W	February 16, 1967	5–1	@ Montreal Canadiens (1966–67)	15–31–7
54	L	February 18, 1967	3–5	@ Toronto Maple Leafs (1966–67)	15–32–7
55	T	February 23, 1967	2–2	@ Montreal Canadiens (1966–67)	15–32–8
56	L	February 25, 1967	3–6	@ Chicago Black Hawks (1966–67)	15–33–8
57	T	February 26, 1967	3–3	@ Detroit Red Wings (1966–67)	15–33–9

March

Game	Result	Date	Score	Opponent	Record
58	L	March 2, 1967	2–5	Chicago Black Hawks (1966–67)	15–34–9
59	T	March 4, 1967	4–4	New York Rangers (1966–67)	15–34–10
60	L	March 5, 1967	3–5	Detroit Red Wings (1966–67)	15–35–10
61	L	March 8, 1967	1–3	@ Chicago Black Hawks (1966–67)	15–36–10
62	W	March 12, 1967	7–3	Detroit Red Wings (1966–67)	16–36–10
63	L	March 15, 1967	2–11	@ Montreal Canadiens (1966–67)	16–37–10
64	W	March 18, 1967	5–3	@ Detroit Red Wings (1966–67)	17–37–10
65	L	March 19, 1967	1–3	@ New York Rangers (1966–67)	17–38–10
66	L	March 23, 1967	3–5	Toronto Maple Leafs (1966–67)	17–39–10
67	L	March 25, 1967	3–4	@ Toronto Maple Leafs (1966–67)	17–40–10
68	L	March 26, 1967	3–6	Montreal Canadiens (1966–67)	17–41–10
69	L	March 30, 1967	1–3	Chicago Black Hawks (1966–67)	17–42–10

April

Game	Result	Date	Score	Opponent	Record
70	L	April 2, 1967	2–5	Toronto Maple Leafs (1966–67)	17–43–10

Legend: Win (2 points) Loss (0 points) Tie (1 point)

== Player statistics ==
=== Regular season ===
Scoring

Player	Pos	GP	G	A	Pts	PIM	PPG	SHG	GWG
John Bucyk	LW	59	18	30	48	12	4	0	1
Pit Martin	C	70	20	22	42	40	4	0	1
Bobby Orr	D	61	13	28	41	102	3	1	0
John McKenzie	RW	69	17	19	36	98	3	1	5
Ed Westfall	D/RW	70	12	24	36	26	1	0	0
Murray Oliver	C	65	9	26	35	16	1	0	2
Wayne Connelly	C	64	13	17	30	12	1	0	1
Ron Schock	C	66	10	20	30	8	1	0	1
Ron Murphy	LW	39	11	16	27	6	0	0	1
Ron Stewart	RW	56	14	10	24	31	5	0	1
Tommy Williams	RW	29	8	13	21	2	2	0	2
Bob Dillabough	C	60	6	12	18	14	0	1	1
Ted Green	D	47	6	10	16	67	5	0	1
Gilles Marotte	D	67	7	8	15	112	1	1	0
Joe Watson	D	69	2	13	15	38	1	0	0
Bob Woytowich	D	64	2	7	9	43	0	0	0
Skip Krake	C	15	6	2	8	4	2	0	0
Bill Goldsworthy	RW	18	3	5	8	21	0	0	0
J.P. Parise	LW	18	2	2	4	10	0	0	0
Wayne Rivers	RW	8	2	1	3	6	0	0	0
Don Awrey	D	4	1	0	1	6	0	0	0
Gary Doak	D	29	0	1	1	50	0	0	0
Eddie Johnston	G	34	0	1	1	0	0	0	0
Ross Lonsberry	LW	8	0	1	1	2	0	0	0
Dallas Smith	D	33	0	1	1	24	0	0	0
Nick Beverley	D	2	0	0	0	0	0	0	0
Ron Buchanan	C	3	0	0	0	0	0	0	0
Gerry Cheevers	G	22	0	0	0	12	0	0	0
Ted Hodgson	RW	4	0	0	0	0	0	0	0
Bernie Parent	G	18	0	0	0	2	0	0	0
Derek Sanderson	C	2	0	0	0	0	0	0	0
Glen Sather	LW	5	0	0	0	0	0	0	0
Barry Wilkins	D	1	0	0	0	0	0	0	0

Goaltending

Player	MIN	GP	W	L	T	GA	GAA	SO
Eddie Johnston	1880	34	8	21	2	116	3.70	0
Gerry Cheevers	1298	22	5	10	6	72	3.33	1
Bernie Parent	1022	18	4	12	2	62	3.64	0
Team:	4200	70	17	43	10	250	3.57	1

Note:

Pos = Position;GP = Games played; G = Goals; A = Assists; Pts = Points; PIM = Penalty minutes; +/- = Plus/minus; PPG = Power-play goals; SHG = Short-handed goals; GWG = Game-winning goals
Pos = Position;GP = Games played; Min, TOI = Minutes played; W = Wins; L = Losses; T,T/OT = Ties; OTL = Overtime losses; GA = Goals-against; GAA = Goals-against average; SO = Shutouts; SA = Shots against; SV = Shots saved;SV% = Save percentage;

== Awards and records ==
- Bobby Orr, Calder Memorial Trophy
- Bobby Orr, NHL Second Team All-Star
