= 1966–67 Montreal Canadiens season =

NHL hockey team season

1966–67 Montreal Canadiens
- League: 2nd NHL
- 1966–67 record: 32–25–13
- Home record: 19–9–7
- Road record: 13–16–6
- Goals for: 202
- Goals against: 188

Team information
- General manager: Sam Pollock
- Coach: Toe Blake
- Captain: Jean Beliveau
- Alternate captains: Henri Richard; Jean-Guy Talbot
- Arena: Montreal Forum

Team leaders
- Goals: Yvan Cournoyer (25)
- Assists: Bobby Rousseau (44)
- Points: Bobby Rousseau (63)
- Penalty minutes: John Ferguson (177)
- Wins: Charlie Hodge and Rogie Vachon (11)
- Goals against average: Rogie Vachon (2.18)

The 1966–67 Montreal Canadiens season was the Canadiens' 58th season of play, and 50th in the National Hockey League (NHL). The Canadiens lost in the 1967 Stanley Cup Finals to the Toronto Maple Leafs in six games. This was the final season before the 1967 NHL expansion.

== Regular season ==
=== Final standings ===
Pos	Team	Pld	W	L	T	GF	GA	GD	Pts
1	Chicago Black Hawks	70	41	17	12	264	170	+94	94
2	Montreal Canadiens	70	32	25	13	202	188	+14	77
3	Toronto Maple Leafs	70	32	27	11	204	211	−7	75
4	New York Rangers	70	30	28	12	188	189	−1	72
5	Detroit Red Wings	70	27	39	4	212	241	−29	58
6	Boston Bruins	70	17	43	10	182	253	−71	44

Source: National Hockey League

=== Record vs. opponents ===
1966–67 NHL Records
Team	BOS	CHI	DET	MTL	NYR	TOR
Boston	—	2–11–1	6–6–2	5–7–2	2–8–4	2–11–1
Chicago	11–2–1	—	10–4	5–2–7	7–5–2	8–4–2
Detroit	6–6–2	4–10	—	4–10	7–7	6–6–2
Montreal	7–5–2	2–5–7	10–4	—	7–5–2	6–6–2
New York	8–2–4	5–7–2	7–7	5–7–2	—	5–5–4
Toronto	11–2–1	4–8–2	6–6–2	6–6–2	5–5–4	—

== Schedule and results ==
1966–67 regular season
October

Game	Result	Date	Score	Opponent	Record
1	W	October 22, 1966	3–1	Boston Bruins	1–0–0
2	W	October 23, 1966	3–2	@ Boston Bruins	2–0–0
3	L	October 26, 1966	3–5	Chicago Black Hawks	2–1–0
4	W	October 29, 1966	3–0	New York Rangers	3–1–0

November

Game	Result	Date	Score	Opponent	Record
5	T	November 2, 1966	2–2	@ Toronto Maple Leafs	3–1–1
6	W	November 5, 1966	3–1	Detroit Red Wings	4–1–1
7	L	November 6, 1966	0–6	@ Detroit Red Wings	4–2–1
8	L	November 9, 1966	2–3	Toronto Maple Leafs	4–3–1
9	L	November 12, 1966	3–6	New York Rangers	4–4–1
10	L	November 13, 1966	1–2	@ Boston Bruins	4–5–1
11	L	November 19, 1966	1–5	@ Toronto Maple Leafs	4–6–1
12	W	November 20, 1966	2–1	@ New York Rangers	5–6–1
13	W	November 22, 1966	3–0	@ Detroit Red Wings	6–6–1
14	L	November 24, 1966	0–5	@ Chicago Black Hawks	6–7–1
15	W	November 26, 1966	3–1	Detroit Red Wings	7–7–1
16	L	November 30, 1966	2–3	@ Toronto Maple Leafs	7–8–1

December

Game	Result	Date	Score	Opponent	Record
17	W	December 3, 1966	3–1	Chicago Black Hawks	8–8–1
18	W	December 4, 1966	3–1	@ New York Rangers	9–8–1
19	W	December 7, 1966	6–3	Toronto Maple Leafs	10–8–1
20	W	December 10, 1966	5–1	Detroit Red Wings	11–8–1
21	L	December 11, 1966	2–4	@ New York Rangers	11–9–1
22	L	December 14, 1966	1–2	@ Chicago Black Hawks	11–10–1
23	T	December 17, 1966	4–4	Chicago Black Hawks	11–10–2
24	L	December 18, 1966	1–3	@ Boston Bruins	11–11–2
25	W	December 21, 1966	6–2	Toronto Maple Leafs	12–11–2
26	L	December 24, 1966	3–4	New York Rangers	12–12–2
27	W	December 25, 1966	4–0	@ Detroit Red Wings	13–12–2
28	T	December 28, 1966	1–1	Boston Bruins	13–12–3
29	W	December 31, 1966	3–0	New York Rangers	14–12–3

January

Game	Result	Date	Score	Opponent	Record
30	L	January 1, 1967	1–4	@ Detroit Red Wings	14–13–3
31	T	January 4, 1967	2–2	@ Chicago Black Hawks	14–13–4
32	W	January 7, 1967	4–3	Detroit Red Wings	15–13–4
33	L	January 8, 1967	1–2	@ New York Rangers	15–14–4
34	L	January 11, 1967	1–2	Toronto Maple Leafs	15–15–4
35	L	January 14, 1967	4–5	Boston Bruins	15–16–4
36	W	January 15, 1967	3–1	@ Boston Bruins	16–16–4
37	T	January 21, 1967	3–3	Chicago Black Hawks	16–16–5
38	L	January 22, 1967	1–4	@ Chicago Black Hawks	16–17–5
39	W	January 25, 1967	3–1	@ Toronto Maple Leafs	17–17–5
40	L	January 26, 1967	1–4	Boston Bruins	17–18–5
41	W	January 28, 1967	3–2	New York Rangers	18–18–5
42	W	January 29, 1967	3–2	@ Boston Bruins	19–18–5

February

Game	Result	Date	Score	Opponent	Record
43	W	February 1, 1967	7–1	Toronto Maple Leafs	20–18–5
44	T	February 4, 1967	3–3	Chicago Black Hawks	20–18–6
45	L	February 5, 1967	1–6	@ Detroit Red Wings	20–19–6
46	L	February 8, 1967	0–5	@ Chicago Black Hawks	20–20–6
47	W	February 11, 1967	4–3	@ Boston Bruins	21–20–6
48	T	February 12, 1967	4–4	@ New York Rangers	21–20–7
49	L	February 16, 1967	1–5	Boston Bruins	21–21–7
50	W	February 18, 1967	3–2	Detroit Red Wings	22–21–7
51	L	February 19, 1967	1–3	@ Detroit Red Wings	22–22–7
52	L	February 22, 1967	2–5	@ Toronto Maple Leafs	22–23–7
53	T	February 23, 1967	2–2	Boston Bruins	22–23–8
54	L	February 25, 1967	0–5	New York Rangers	22–24–8
55	T	February 26, 1967	2–2	@ Chicago Black Hawks	22–24–9

March

Game	Result	Date	Score	Opponent	Record
56	T	March 1, 1967	1–1	Toronto Maple Leafs	22–24–10
57	W	March 4, 1967	6–2	Detroit Red Wings	23–24–10
58	W	March 5, 1967	2–0	@ New York Rangers	24–24–10
59	L	March 8, 1967	4–6	@ Toronto Maple Leafs	24–25–10
60	T	March 11, 1967	3–3	Chicago Black Hawks	24–25–11
61	T	March 12, 1967	2–2	@ New York Rangers	24–25–12
62	W	March 15, 1967	11–2	Boston Bruins	25–25–12
63	W	March 18, 1967	4–2	New York Rangers	26–25–12
64	T	March 19, 1967	4–4	@ Chicago Black Hawks	26–25–13
65	W	March 22, 1967	5–3	@ Toronto Maple Leafs	27–25–13
66	W	March 25, 1967	4–1	Detroit Red Wings	28–25–13
67	W	March 26, 1967	6–3	@ Boston Bruins	29–25–13
68	W	March 29, 1967	5–3	Toronto Maple Leafs	30–25–13

April

Game	Result	Date	Score	Opponent	Record
69	W	April 1, 1967	5–4	Chicago Black Hawks	31–25–13
70	W	April 2, 1967	4–2	@ Detroit Red Wings	32–25–13

Legend: Win (2 points) Loss (0 points) Tie (1 point)

== Playoffs ==
In the playoffs, the Canadiens met the New York Rangers in the first round, sweeping the series 4–0 to advance to the Finals.

=== Finals ===
In the finals, the Canadiens played the Toronto Maple Leafs, whose "Over the Hill Gang" produced an upset win over the defending champion Canadiens, winning the series 4–2.

== Player statistics ==
=== Regular season ===
==== Scoring ====
Player	Pos	GP	G	A	Pts	PIM	PPG	SHG	GWG
Bobby Rousseau	RW	68	19	44	63	58	5	0	2
Henri Richard	C	65	21	34	55	28	2	0	1
John Ferguson	LW	67	20	22	42	177	5	0	2
Ralph Backstrom	C	69	14	27	41	39	1	0	0
Yvan Cournoyer	RW	69	25	15	40	14	20	0	7
Jean Beliveau	C	53	12	26	38	22	2	0	0
Claude Larose	RW	69	19	16	35	82	2	0	3
J. C. Tremblay	D	60	8	26	34	14	3	0	1
Gilles Tremblay	LW	62	13	19	32	16	3	1	2
Claude Provost	RW	64	11	13	24	16	3	0	3
Dick Duff	LW	51	12	11	23	23	3	0	2
Jacques Laperriere	D	61	0	20	20	48	0	0	0
Dave Balon	LW	48	11	8	19	31	0	0	5
Ted Harris	D	65	2	16	18	86	1	0	0
Leon Rochefort	RW	27	9	7	16	6	0	0	3
Terry Harper	D	56	0	16	16	99	0	0	0
Jean-Guy Talbot	D	68	3	5	8	51	0	2	1
Jim Roberts	D/RW	63	3	0	3	16	0	0	0
Noel Price	D	24	0	3	3	8	0	0	0
Carol Vadnais	D	11	0	3	3	35	0	0	0
Andre Boudrias	LW	2	0	1	1	0	0	0	0
Garry Peters	C	4	0	1	1	2	0	0	0
Rogie Vachon	G	19	0	1	1	0	0	0	0
Garry Bauman	G	2	0	0	0	0	0	0	0
Jean Gauthier	D	2	0	0	0	2	0	0	0
Charlie Hodge	G	37	0	0	0	2	0	0	0
Serge Savard	D	2	0	0	0	0	0	0	0
Gump Worsley	G	18	0	0	0	4	0	0	0

==== Goaltending ====
Player	MIN	GP	W	L	T	GA	GAA	SO
Charlie Hodge	2055	37	11	15	7	88	2.57	3
Rogie Vachon	1137	19	11	3	4	47	2.48	1
Gump Worsley	888	18	9	6	2	47	3.18	1
Garry Bauman	120	2	1	1	0	5	2.50	0
Team:	4200	70	32	25	13	187	2.67	5

=== Playoffs ===
==== Scoring ====
Player	Pos	GP	G	A	Pts	PIM	PPG	SHG	GWG
Jean Beliveau	C	10	6	5	11	26			
Henri Richard	C	10	4	6	10	2			
Bobby Rousseau	RW	10	1	7	8	4			
Ralph Backstrom	C	10	5	2	7	6			
John Ferguson	LW	10	4	2	6	22			
J. C. Tremblay	D	10	2	4	6	2			
Claude Larose	RW	10	1	5	6	15			
Yvan Cournoyer	RW	10	2	3	5	6			
Dick Duff	LW	10	2	3	5	4			
Claude Provost	RW	7	1	1	2	0			
Leon Rochefort	RW	10	1	1	2	4			
Dave Balon	LW	9	0	2	2	6			
Jim Roberts	D/RW	4	1	0	1	0			
Terry Harper	D	10	0	1	1	15			
Ted Harris	D	10	0	1	1	19			
Jacques Laperriere	D	9	0	1	1	9			
Gilles Tremblay	LW	10	0	1	1	0			
Jean-Guy Talbot	D	10	0	0	0	0			
Rogie Vachon	G	9	0	0	0	0			
Carol Vadnais	D	1	0	0	0	2			
Gump Worsley	G	2	0	0	0	0			

==== Goaltending ====
Player	MIN	GP	W	L	GA	GAA	SO
Rogie Vachon	555	9	6	3	22	2.38	0
Gump Worsley	80	2	0	1	2	1.50	0
Team:	635	10	6	4	24	2.27	0

Note:

Pos = Position;GP = Games played; G = Goals; A = Assists; Pts = Points; PIM = Penalty minutes; +/- = Plus/minus; PPG = Power-play goals; SHG = Short-handed goals; GWG = Game-winning goals
Pos = Position;GP = Games played; Min, TOI = Minutes played; W = Wins; L = Losses; T,T/OT = Ties; OTL = Overtime losses; GA = Goals-against; GAA = Goals-against average; SO = Shutouts; SA = Shots against; SV = Shots saved;SV% = Save percentage;

== Transactions ==
June 13, 1966	To Montreal Canadiens Garry Peters; Ted Taylor	To New York Rangers Red Berenson

== Draft picks ==
Montreal's draft picks at the 1966 NHL amateur draft held at the Mount Royal Hotel in Montreal.

Round	#	Player	Nationality	College/Junior/Club team (League)
1	5	Phil Myre	Canada	Shawinigan Bruins (QJHL)
2	11	Maurice St. Jacques	Canada	London Nationals (OHA)
3	17	Jude Drouin	Canada	Verdun Maple Leafs (QJHL)
4	23	Bob Pate	Canada	Montreal Junior Canadiens (OHA)

== See also ==
- 1966–67 NHL season
