= Doug Robinson (ice hockey) =

Canadian ice hockey player

- Born: August 27, 1940 (age 85) St. Catharines, Ontario, Canada
- Height: 6 ft 2 in (188 cm)
- Weight: 185 lb (84 kg; 13 st 3 lb)
- Position: Left wing
- Shot: Left
- Played for: Chicago Black Hawks; New York Rangers; Los Angeles Kings
- NHL draft: Undrafted
- Playing career: 1961–1972

Douglas Garnet Robinson (born August 27, 1940) is a Canadian former ice hockey player. He played 240 games in the National Hockey League (NHL) with the Chicago Black Hawks, New York Rangers and Los Angeles Kings from 1964 to 1971. Robinson's son, Rob Robinson, also played in the NHL.

== Playing career ==
Robinson started his NHL career with Chicago and also played for New York and Los Angeles. He was traded along with Denis DeJordy, Dale Hoganson and Noel Price from the Kings to the Montreal Canadiens for Rogie Vachon on November 4, 1971. In 240 NHL regular season games, he scored 44 goals and had 67 assists for a career total of 111 points with 36 penalty minutes. In 11 NHL playoff games, he recorded 4 goals and 3 assists, for a total of 7 points.

== Career statistics ==
=== Regular season and playoffs ===
			Regular season					Playoffs
Season	Team	League	GP	G	A	Pts	PIM	GP	G	A	Pts	PIM
1955–56	Collingwood Cobras	OHA-B	—	—	—	—	—	—	—	—	—	—
1956–57	Guelph Biltmores	OHA	52	9	7	16	8	10	1	2	3	14
1956–57	Guelph Biltmores	M-Cup	—	—	—	—	—	6	1	2	3	2
1957–58	Guelph Biltmores	OHA	6	2	1	3	2	—	—	—	—	—
1957–58	St. Catharines Teepees	OHA	—	—	—	—	—	6	0	1	1	0
1958–59	St. Catharines Teepees	OHA	52	12	11	23	10	7	0	3	3	0
1959–60	St. Catharines Teepees	OHA	48	15	20	35	4	17	3	4	7	6
1959–60	St. Catharines Teepees	M-Cup	—	—	—	—	—	14	7	3	10	4
1960–61	St. Catharines Teepees	OHA	48	36	30	66	22	6	3	1	4	20
1960–61	Sault Thunderbirds	EPHL	—	—	—	—	—	1	0	0	0	2
1961–62	Sault Thunderbirds	EPHL	70	33	26	59	32	—	—	—	—	—
1961–62	Buffalo Bisons	AHL	—	—	—	—	—	2	0	0	0	0
1962–63	Buffalo Bisons	AHL	72	36	37	73	8	13	10	4	14	2
1963–64	Buffalo Bisons	AHL	46	22	27	49	22	—	—	—	—	—
1963–64	Chicago Black Hawks	NHL	—	—	—	—	—	4	0	0	0	0
1964–65	Chicago Black Hawks	NHL	40	2	9	11	8	—	—	—	—	—
1964–65	New York Rangers	NHL	21	8	14	22	2	—	—	—	—	—
1965–66	New York Rangers	NHL	51	8	12	20	8	—	—	—	—	—
1965–66	Baltimore Clippers	AHL	5	2	2	4	0	—	—	—	—	—
1966–67	New York Rangers	NHL	1	0	0	0	0	—	—	—	—	—
1966–67	Baltimore Clippers	AHL	63	39	33	72	89	9	4	6	10	2
1967–68	Los Angeles Kings	NHL	34	9	9	18	6	7	4	3	7	0
1967–68	Springfield Kings	AHL	36	21	25	46	0	—	—	—	—	—
1968–69	Los Angeles Kings	NHL	31	2	10	12	2	—	—	—	—	—
1968–69	Springfield Kings	AHL	42	14	20	34	6	—	—	—	—	—
1969–70	Springfield Kings	AHL	70	45	41	86	26	14	5	3	8	0
1970–71	Los Angeles Kings	NHL	61	15	13	28	8	—	—	—	—	—
1971–72	Seattle Totems	WHL	9	7	1	8	0	—	—	—	—	—
1971–72	Nova Scotia Voyageurs	AHL	27	10	17	27	4	—	—	—	—	—
AHL totals			361	189	202	391	155	38	19	13	32	4
NHL totals			240	44	67	111	36	11	4	3	7	0
