= Denis DeJordy =

Canadian ice hockey player

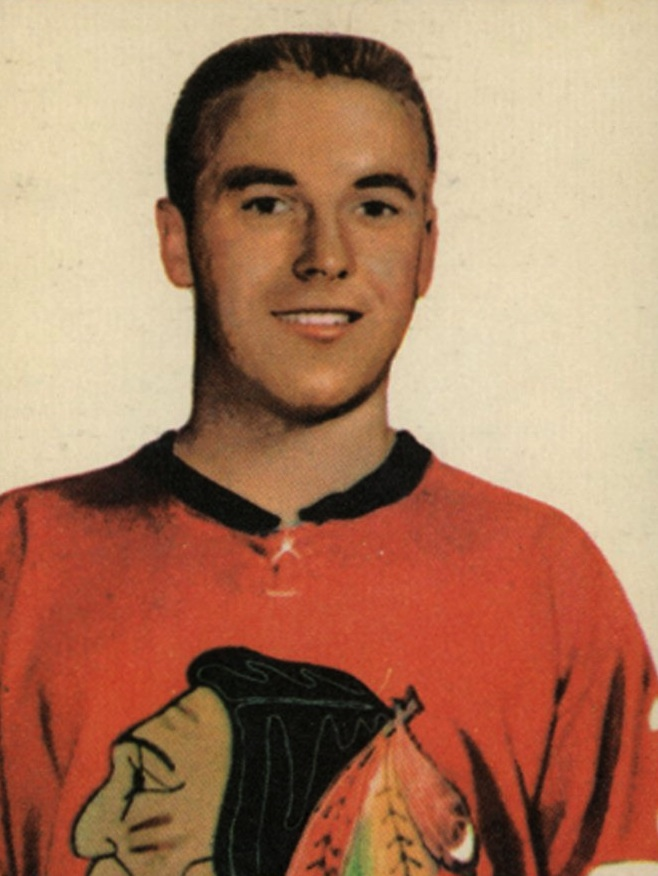
- Born: November 15, 1938 (age 87) Saint-Hyacinthe, Quebec, Canada
- Height: 5 ft 9 in (175 cm)
- Weight: 175 lb (79 kg; 12 st 7 lb)
- Position: Goaltender
- Caught: Left
- Played for: Chicago Black Hawks; Los Angeles Kings; Montreal Canadiens; Detroit Red Wings
- Playing career: 1959–1974

Joseph Denis Emile DeJordy (born November 15, 1938), is a Canadian former professional ice hockey player. He played goal for four National Hockey League teams, most notably the Chicago Black Hawks. In 1966–67, he and Glenn Hall won the Vezina Trophy for the best goals-against average in the NHL.

== Playing career ==
DeJordy played junior hockey with the Junior B Dixie Beehives in 1956–57 and the Major Junior A St. Catharines Teepees of the Ontario Hockey Association. In two seasons in St. Catharines, he helped the Teepees to the top of the Ontario League. Stan Mikita was the team's offensive leader at the time; he and DeJordy were later teammates with the Chicago Black Hawks for several seasons.

DeJordy began his professional career with the Sault Ste. Marie Thunderbirds of the EPHL and the Buffalo Bisons of the AHL. He was first called up by the Black Hawks during the 1960-61 playoffs but did not play. His name was engraved on the Stanley Cup and he appeared in the Hawks' Stanley Cup team picture, even though he had yet to play a single NHL game. He played his first NHL game on November 7, 1962, when he replaced Glenn Hall, who had left the game with a back injury. (That injury brought an end to Hall's streak of 502 consecutive complete games, a league record.) DeJordy played five games that season for Chicago. In 1966–67, DeJordy and Hall won the Vezina Trophy for the best goals-against average in the league.

When the Black Hawks acquired Tony Esposito from the Montreal Canadiens, DeJordy was relegated to backup for the 1969–70 season. He then played for the Los Angeles Kings for three seasons. He was traded along with Dale Hoganson, Noel Price and Doug Robinson from the Kings to the Canadiens for Rogie Vachon on November 4, 1971. He became the backup to Ken Dryden, who had played a large part in leading the Canadiens to the Stanley Cup the previous spring. DeJordy played seven games that season. He was then dealt to the Detroit Red Wings and played parts of two seasons there, with stints in the minor leagues. He then became a goaltending coach for the Wings, the first in the NHL.

During his career, DeJordy owned a sporting goods store in his hometown of St. Hyacinthe, Quebec. Dejordy's brother Roger DeJordy was a veteran minor league hockey player and was enshrined in the Hershey Bears Hockey Club Hall of Fame in 2015.

== Awards ==
- Selected to the OHA-Jr. First All-Star Team in 1959.
- EPHL Best Rookie Award Winner in 1960.
- Stanley Cup Championship in 1961.
- Les Cunningham Award Winner in 1963.
- Harry "Hap" Holmes Memorial Award Winner in 1963.
- Selected to the AHL First All-Star Team in 1963.
- Selected to the CPHL First All-Star Team in 1966.
- Vezina Trophy Winner in 1967 (shared with Glenn Hall).
- Selected to the AHL Second All-Star Team in 1974.

== Career statistics ==
=== Regular season and playoffs ===
			Regular season									Playoffs
Season	Team	League	GP	W	L	T	MIN	GA	SO	GAA	SV%	GP	W	L	T	MIN	GA	SO	GAA	SV%
1956–57	Dixie Beehives	CJHL	—	—	—	—	—	—	—	—	—	—	—	—	—	—	—	—	—	—
1957–58	St. Catharines Teepees	OHA	52	32	14	6	3120	174	1	3.35	—	8	3	4	1	480	36	0	4.50	—
1957–58	Buffalo Bisons	AHL	1	0	1	0	60	5	0	5.00	—	—	—	—	—	—	—	—	—	—
1958–59	St. Catharines Teepees	OHA	53	40	10	3	3180	169	1	3.19	—	7	2	4	1	420	18	0	2.57	—
1958–59	Peterborough Petes	M-Cup	—	—	—	—	—	—	—	—	—	5	1	4	—	300	23	0	4.60	—
1959–60	Sault Ste. Marie Thunderbirds	EPHL	69	27	31	11	4140	258	1	3.74	—	—	—	—	—	—	—	—	—	—
1960–61	Sault Ste. Marie Thunderbirds	EPHL	33	16	14	3	1980	115	2	3.48	—	—	—	—	—	—	—	—	—	—
1960–61	Buffalo Bisons	AHL	40	20	18	2	2400	127	3	3.18	—	4	0	4	—	264	18	0	4.09	—
1961–62	Buffalo Bisons	AHL	69	36	30	3	4170	210	8	3.02	—	11	6	5	—	706	20	2	1.70	—
1962–63	Chicago Black Hawks	NHL	5	2	1	2	290	12	0	2.48	.925	—	—	—	—	—	—	—	—	—
1962–63	Buffalo Bisons	AHL	67	32	23	7	4020	187	6	2.79	—	13	8	5	—	802	28	1	2.09	—
1963–64	Chicago Black Hawks	NHL	6	2	3	1	340	19	0	3.35	.907	1	0	0	—	20	2	0	6.00	.714
1963–64	St. Louis Braves	CPHL	1	0	1	0	60	5	0	5.00	—	—	—	—	—	—	—	—	—	—
1964–65	Chicago Black Hawks	NHL	30	16	11	3	1760	74	3	2.52	.915	2	0	1	—	80	9	0	6.75	.813
1964–65	Buffalo Bisons	AHL	7	3	4	0	450	20	1	2.67	—	—	—	—	—	—	—	—	—	—
1965–66	St. Louis Braves	CPHL	70	30	31	5	4200	217	6	3.10	—	5	1	4	—	300	18	0	3.60	—
1966–67	Chicago Black Hawks	NHL	44	22	12	7	2536	104	4	2.46	.923	4	1	2	—	184	10	0	3.26	.902
1967–68	Chicago Black Hawks	NHL	50	23	15	11	2838	128	4	2.71	.911	11	5	6	—	662	34	0	3.08	.911
1968–69	Chicago Black Hawks	NHL	53	22	22	7	2981	156	2	3.14	.908	—	—	—	—	—	—	—	—	—
1968–69	Dallas Black Hawks	CHL	15	8	4	3	899	41	1	2.74	—	—	—	—	—	—	—	—	—	—
1969–70	Chicago Black Hawks	NHL	10	3	5	1	557	25	0	2.69	.915	—	—	—	—	—	—	—	—	—
1969–70	Los Angeles Kings	NHL	21	5	11	4	1147	62	0	3.24	.901	—	—	—	—	—	—	—	—	—
1970–71	Los Angeles Kings	NHL	60	18	29	11	3375	214	1	3.80	.887	—	—	—	—	—	—	—	—	—
1971–72	Los Angeles Kings	NHL	5	0	5	0	291	23	0	4.74	.844	—	—	—	—	—	—	—	—	—
1971–72	Montreal Canadiens	NHL	7	3	2	1	332	25	0	4.52	.860	—	—	—	—	—	—	—	—	—
1972–73	Detroit Red Wings	NHL	24	8	11	3	1331	83	1	3.74	.862	—	—	—	—	—	—	—	—	—
1972–73	Fort Worth Wings	CHL	10	—	—	—	560	41	0	4.39	—	—	—	—	—	—	—	—	—	—
1973–74	Detroit Red Wings	NHL	1	0	1	0	20	4	0	12.00	.500	—	—	—	—	—	—	—	—	—
1973–74	Baltimore Clippers	AHL	42	21	13	6	2428	131	1	3.23	—	4	1	3	—	252	22	0	5.23	—
NHL totals			316	124	128	51	17,798	929	15	3.13	.902	18	6	9	—	946	55	0	3.49	.898

Preceded by Gump Worsley and Charlie Hodge	Winner of the Vezina Trophy with Glenn Hall; 1967	Succeeded by Rogatien Vachon and Gump Worsley
