= Pete Stemkowski =

Canadian ice hockey player (born 1943)

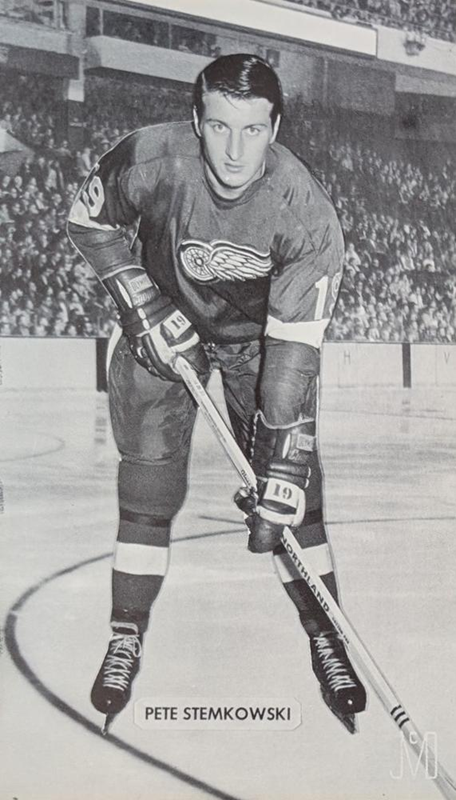
- Born: August 25, 1943 (age 83) Winnipeg, Manitoba, Canada
- Height: 6 ft 1 in (185 cm)
- Weight: 196 lb (89 kg; 14 st 0 lb)
- Position: Centre
- Shot: Left
- Played for: Toronto Maple Leafs; Detroit Red Wings; New York Rangers; Los Angeles Kings
- Playing career: 1963–1979

Peter David Stemkowski (born August 25, 1943) is a Canadian former professional ice hockey player. Playing as a centre, he spent 15 seasons in the National Hockey League (NHL), and played for the Toronto Maple Leafs, Detroit Red Wings, New York Rangers, and Los Angeles Kings. Nicknamed "Stemmer", Stemkowski is best remembered for his heroics in the semifinal series of the 1971 Stanley Cup playoffs when he scored two overtime goals for the New York Rangers in an eventual series loss to the Chicago Black Hawks. He won the Stanley Cup in 1967 with the Toronto Maple Leafs. Considered a textbook "two-way" centre, able to kill penalties and play defence as well as scoring goals, Stemkowski is also remembered as one of the top faceoff takers of the NHL.

== Playing career ==
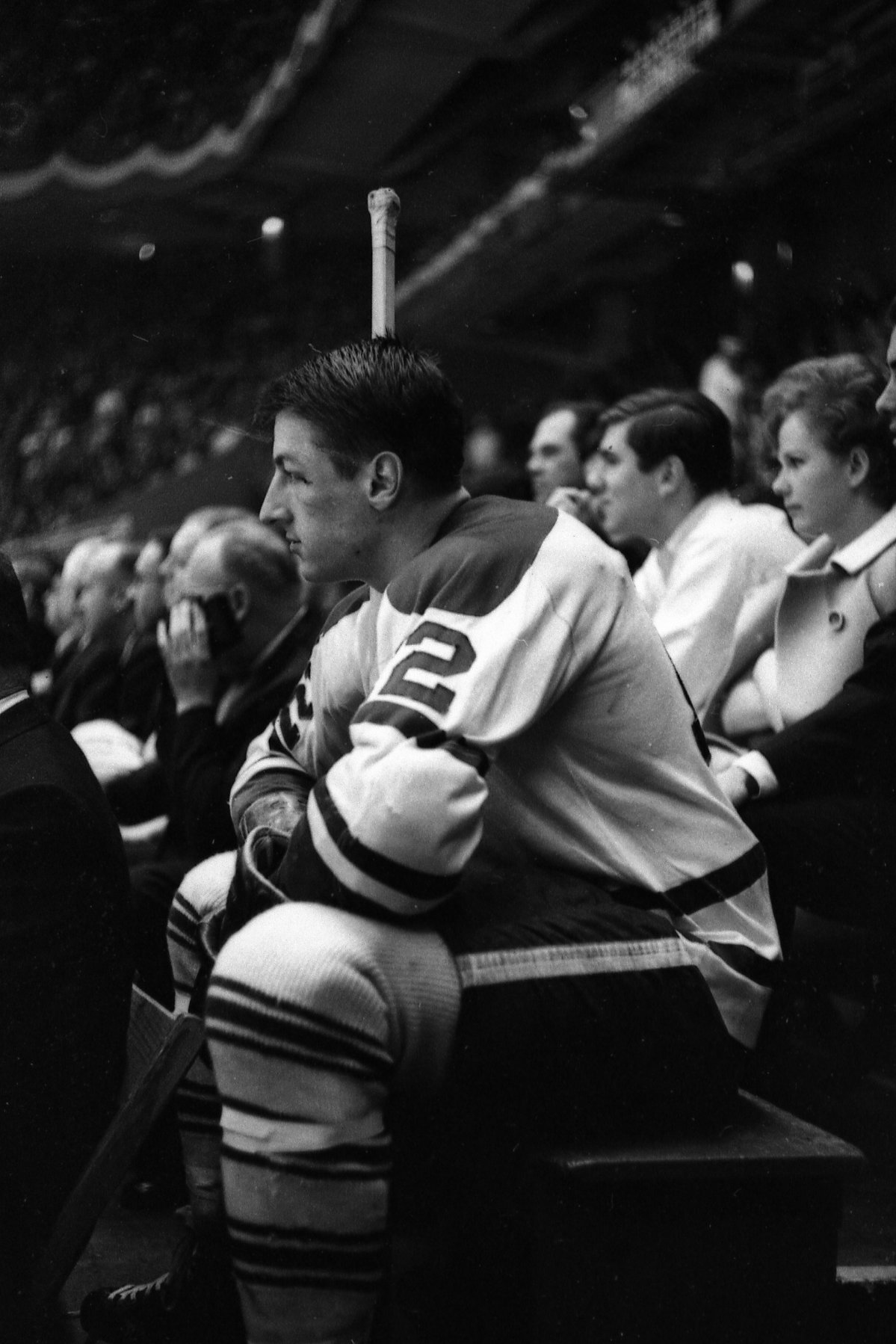
Pete Stemkowski with the Toronto Maple Leafs c. 1965

Stemkowski was a product of the Toronto Maple Leafs junior system. He played in his native Winnipeg before moving to Toronto at the age of 17 to play with the Ontario Hockey Association's Toronto Marlboros, the Leafs' junior team.

After splitting his first three professional seasons between the Leafs and their American Hockey League farm team in Rochester, Stemkowski finally made the Leafs squad in 1966–67. It was great timing as the Leafs won the Stanley Cup that year. With veterans such as Terry Sawchuk, Johnny Bower, George Armstrong, Allan Stanley, Frank Mahovlich, and Tim Horton, Stemkowski was an important contributor with 12 points in 12 games.

He was part of a six-player blockbuster transaction in which he was traded along with Frank Mahovlich and Garry Unger from the Maple Leafs to the Red Wings for Norm Ullman, Paul Henderson, and Floyd Smith on March 4, 1968. The Maple Leafs and Red Wings were in fifth and sixth place respectively at the bottom of the East Division standings at the time of the deal. It gave him a chance to play regularly and he responded well with two 20+ goal seasons in his two full seasons in Detroit.

Stemkowski was traded to the Rangers for Larry Brown on October 31, 1970. This was partially a result of an incident in practice where Stemkowski disrespected new head coach Ned Harkness. Harkness had just come to Detroit from Cornell University. Stemkowski, a noted joker, was mockingly imitating a college cheer. Harkness ensured Stemkowski was gone shortly afterward.

After enduring years of frustration, the Rangers were emerging as an NHL powerhouse. The roster contained previous players like Rod Gilbert, Jean Ratelle, and Ed Giacomin with help from young players such as Stemkowski, Brad Park, Steve Vickers, and Walt Tkaczuk.

Despite the Rangers losing a 1971 Stanley Cup semifinal series in seven games to the Chicago Black Hawks, Stemkowski scored game-winning overtime goals in each of two games. The first occurred just 1:37 into overtime to decide a 2–1 game one win at Chicago Stadium on April 18. With the Rangers facing elimination in game six, he scored the most famous goal of his playing career eleven nights later at 1:29 of the third overtime, after a total of 41:29 of extra time, in a 3–2 victory at Madison Square Garden that forced a deciding seventh game. The contest lasted 4 hours 23 minutes and ended two minutes before midnight ET. Stemkowski played six strong seasons in New York, during which he recorded three 20+ goal seasons.

In 1977–78, Stemkowski finished his career playing one season with the Los Angeles Kings. Speaking of the experience, he said, "I started my career in Toronto in the early 60's. The Leafs were a real powerhouse back then and all you heard was hockey 24 hours a day. When I came to the Kings the whole atmosphere changed. I'd go to the bank and the teller asked me what I did. I said I play for the Kings. The teller said, "who and what are the Kings?"

With Los Angeles, Stemkowski played with Dave Schultz and Marcel Dionne. "I remember a lot of traveling with the Kings and that I played with Dave "The Hammer" Schultz. I got to know the other side of the reigning "bad boy" in the NHL. He helped me find a place to live when I first arrived."

"Playing with Marcel Dionne was a treat. He was such a talent. Marcel and his family really did a lot to keep the team close. Every Sunday Marcel would invite the entire team over to his house for a barbecue and swim."

== Broadcasting career ==
For a time in the 1980s, Stemkowski was a morning disc jockey for WDJZ in Bridgeport, Connecticut. He was also a freelance announcer for the Entertainment Sports Network.

He has served a stint as the television (1992–1996) and radio colour commentator (2000–2005) for the San Jose Sharks and now does so for the New York Rangers on a part-time basis. He was rumoured to be a candidate to become the Rangers' full-time radio analyst in 2006–07 but has retained his back-up role and makes appearances at Rangers events.

== Legal troubles ==
On May 7, 1982, Stemkowski pleaded guilty to a single misdemeanor count of criminal solicitation in Nassau County, New York. Stemkowski had lent $35,000 to a business associate, which had not been repaid along with $35,000 in interest. He offered $20,000 to an undercover Nassau County police officer to fly to California and break an ankle and wrist of the business associate. After making his guilty plea, Stemkowski expressed remorse for his actions, saying, "Something was rightfully owed to me. I felt I had to get it back. Foolishly and stupidly, I went about it the wrong way." By pleading guilty, Stemkowski avoided a charge of conspiracy.

== Career statistics ==
			Regular season					Playoffs
Season	Team	League	GP	G	A	Pts	PIM	GP	G	A	Pts	PIM
1960–61	Winnipeg Monarchs	MJHL	31	22	16	38	29	—	—	—	—	—
1961–62	Winnipeg Monarchs	MJHL	40	31	34	65	100	8	3	7	10	22
1962–63	Winnipeg Monarchs	MJHL	5	6	3	9	8	—	—	—	—	—
1962–63	Toronto Marlboros	OHA-Jr.	23	16	27	43	44	11	7	17	24	26
1963–64	Toronto Marlboros	OHA-Jr.	51	42	61	103	89	9	5	9	14	8
1963–64	Toronto Maple Leafs	NHL	1	0	0	0	2	—	—	—	—	—
1963–64	Toronto Marlboros	MC	—	—	—	—	—	12	14	15	29	6
1964–65	Toronto Maple Leafs	NHL	36	5	15	20	33	6	0	3	3	7
1964–65	Rochester Americans	AHL	35	17	22	39	52	—	—	—	—	—
1965–66	Toronto Maple Leafs	NHL	56	4	12	16	55	4	0	0	0	26
1965–66	Rochester Americans	AHL	7	5	5	10	8	—	—	—	—	—
1966–67	Toronto Maple Leafs	NHL	68	13	22	35	75	12	5	7	12	20
1967–68	Toronto Maple Leafs	NHL	60	7	15	22	82	—	—	—	—	—
1967–68	Detroit Red Wings	NHL	13	3	6	9	4	—	—	—	—	—
1968–69	Detroit Red Wings	NHL	71	21	31	52	81	—	—	—	—	—
1969–70	Detroit Red Wings	NHL	76	25	24	49	114	4	1	1	2	6
1970–71	Detroit Red Wings	NHL	10	2	2	4	8	—	—	—	—	—
1970–71	New York Rangers	NHL	68	16	29	45	61	13	3	2	5	6
1971–72	New York Rangers	NHL	59	11	17	28	53	16	4	8	12	18
1972–73	New York Rangers	NHL	78	22	37	59	71	10	4	2	6	6
1973–74	New York Rangers	NHL	78	25	45	70	74	13	6	6	12	35
1974–75	New York Rangers	NHL	77	24	35	59	63	3	1	0	1	10
1975–76	New York Rangers	NHL	75	13	28	41	49	—	—	—	—	—
1976–77	New York Rangers	NHL	61	2	13	15	8	—	—	—	—	—
1977–78	Los Angeles Kings	NHL	80	13	18	31	33	2	1	0	1	2
1978–79	Springfield Indians	AHL	24	3	12	15	8	—	—	—	—	—
NHL totals			967	206	349	555	866	83	25	29	54	136

== Awards and honours ==
- Memorial Cup champion – 1964
- Stanley Cup champion – 1967
- Played in NHL All-Star Game – 1968
- "Honoured Member" of the Manitoba Hockey Hall of Fame.
- In the 2009 book 100 Ranger Greats, was ranked No. 54 all-time of the 901 New York Rangers who had played during the team's first 82 seasons
- National Polish American Sports Hall of Fame – 2002
