= 1965 Stanley Cup Final =

1965 ice hockey championship series

	1	2	3	4	5	6	7	Total
Chicago Black Hawks	2	0	3	5	0	2	0	3
Montreal Canadiens	3	2	1	1	6	1	4	4
- Location(s): Montreal: Montreal Forum (1, 2, 5, 7); Chicago: Chicago Stadium (3, 4, 6)
- Coaches: Chicago: Billy Reay; Montreal: Toe Blake
- Captains: Chicago: Pierre Pilote; Montreal: Jean Beliveau
- Dates: April 17 – May 1, 1965
- MVP: Jean Beliveau (Canadiens)
- Series-winning goal: Jean Beliveau (0:14, first)
- Hall of Famers: Canadiens: Jean Beliveau (1972); Yvan Cournoyer (1982); Dick Duff (2006); Jacques Laperriere (1987; did not play); Henri Richard (1979); Gump Worsley (1980); Black Hawks: Phil Esposito (1984); Glenn Hall (1975); Bill Hay (2015, builder); Bobby Hull (1983); Stan Mikita (1983); Pierre Pilote (1975); Coaches: Toe Blake (1966, player); Officials: Josh Ashley (1981); Neil Armstrong (1991); John D'Amico (1993); Matt Pavelich (1987); Frank Udvari (1973)

The 1965 Stanley Cup Final was the championship series of the National Hockey League's (NHL) 1964–65 season, and the culmination of the 1965 Stanley Cup playoffs. It was contested between the Chicago Black Hawks and the Montreal Canadiens. The Canadiens won the best-of-seven series, four games to three, to win the Stanley Cup. Significantly, Game 7 marked the first time that any NHL competition had taken place during the month of May.

== Paths to the Finals ==
Montreal defeated the three-time defending champion Toronto Maple Leafs 4–2 to advance to the finals and Chicago defeated the Detroit Red Wings 4–3.

== Game summaries ==
As in 1955, all games were won by the home team. This was the last final until 2003 that this happened. Gump Worsley made his first Finals appearance after 12 years in the league and recorded two shutouts, including the one in game seven. Jean Beliveau was the inaugural winner of the Conn Smythe Trophy as playoff MVP, scoring eight goals and eight assists in thirteen games.

=== Game one ===
April 17	Chicago Black Hawks	2–3	Montreal Canadiens	Montreal Forum	Recap

Scoring summary
Period	Team	Goal	Assist(s)	Time	Score
1st	None				
2nd	MTL	Henri Richard (5)	Red Berenson (1)	02:39	1–0 MTL
2nd	CHI	Camille Henry (1) – pp	Bobby Hull (6)	04:47	1–1
2nd	MTL	John Ferguson (2)	Unassisted	05:26	2–1 MTL
3rd	CHI	Matt Ravlich (1) – pp	Chico Maki (7) and Stan Mikita (5)	02:38	2–2
3rd	MTL	Yvan Cournoyer (2) – pp	Ted Harris (6) and Jean Beliveau (4)	08:59	3–2 MTL
Penalty summary
Period	Team	Player	Penalty	Time	PIM
1st	CHI	Doug Mohns	Hooking	01:17	2:00
1st	MTL	Jean-Guy Talbot	Elbowing	03:23	2:00
1st	MTL	John Ferguson	Elbowing	07:20	2:00
1st	CHI	Doug Jarrett	Holding	14:02	2:00
1st	MTL	J. C. Tremblay	Hooking	16:32	2:00
2nd	MTL	Jean Beliveau	Cross-checking	03:42	2:00
2nd	CHI	Stan Mikita	High-sticking	07:40	2:00
2nd	MTL	Bobby Rousseau	High-sticking	07:40	2:00
2nd	MTL	Ted Harris	Holding	08:07	2:00
2nd	CHI	Elmer Vasko	Holding	11:07	2:00
2nd	MTL	Jean-Guy Talbot	Charging	17:00	2:00
2nd	CHI	Stan Mikita	Slashing	19:55	2:00
2nd	MTL	Jean Beliveau	Slashing	19:55	2:00
3rd	MTL	Henri Richard	Hooking	01:34	2:00
3rd	CHI	Chico Maki	Holding	07:12	2:00
3rd	CHI	Al MacNeil	Charging	12:02	2:00

Shots by period
Team	1	2	3	Total
Chicago	10	9	5	24
Montreal	7	17	7	31

=== Game two ===
April 20	Chicago Black Hawks	0–2	Montreal Canadiens	Montreal Forum	Recap

Scoring summary
Period	Team	Goal	Assist(s)	Time	Score
1st	None				
2nd	MTL	Jean Beliveau (4) – pp	Noel Picard (1) and Claude Provost (5)	02:55	1–0 MTL
3rd	MTL	Dick Duff (1) – pp	Jean Beliveau (5) and J. C. Tremblay (5)	08:07	2–0 MTL
Penalty summary
Period	Team	Player	Penalty	Time	PIM
1st	CHI	Bobby Hull	Slashing	01:55	2:00
1st	MTL	Claude Provost	Interference	01:55	2:00
1st	CHI	Doug Jarrett	Elbowing	07:13	2:00
1st	MTL	Jean-Guy Talbot	Holding	10:57	2:00
1st	MTL	Jean-Guy Talbot	Tripping	13:10	2:00
1st	CHI	Al MacNeil	Holding	16:05	2:00
1st	CHI	Ted Harris	Holding	19:02	2:00
2nd	CHI	Doug Jarrett	Holding	02:10	2:00
2nd	CHI	Al MacNeil	Tripping	04:58	2:00
2nd	CHI	Stan Mikita	High-sticking	07:50	2:00
2nd	MTL	Henri Richard	Holding	07:50	2:00
2nd	CHI	Bobby Hull	High-sticking	09:30	2:00
2nd	CHI	Doug Mohns	Slashing	12:04	2:00
2nd	MTL	John Ferguson	Hooking	12:04	2:00
2nd	MTL	Jean-Guy Talbot	Hooking	13:36	2:00
2nd	CHI	Doug Jarrett	Boarding	15:52	2:00
2nd	MTL	Henri Richard	Tripping	19:26	2:00
3rd	CHI	Stan Mikita	High-sticking	07:50	2:00
3rd	MTL	John Ferguson	Elbowing	13:21	2:00
3rd	CHI	Phil Esposito	Roughing	16:58	2:00
3rd	MTL	Henri Richard	Roughing	16:58	2:00

Shots by period
Team	1	2	3	Total
Chicago	5	8	5	18
Montreal	11	13	7	31

=== Game three ===
April 22	Montreal Canadiens	1–3	Chicago Black Hawks	Chicago Stadium	Recap

Scoring summary
Period	Team	Goal	Assist(s)	Time	Score
1st	None				
2nd	MTL	John Ferguson (3)	J. C. Tremblay (6) and Ralph Backstrom (3)	04:16	1–0 MTL
2nd	CHI	Phil Esposito (3)	Chico Maki (8) and Pierre Pilote (5)	05:03	1–1
3rd	CHI	Kenny Wharram (2)	Stan Mikita (6)	02:08	2–1 CHI
3rd	CHI	Chico Maki (3) – en	Phil Esposito (3) and Bobby Hull (7)	19:24	3–1 CHI
Penalty summary
Period	Team	Player	Penalty	Time	PIM
1st	MTL	Bobby Rousseau	Holding	07:23	2:00
1st	CHI	Pierre Pilote	Cross-checking	07:51	2:00
1st	CHI	Matt Ravlich	Holding	08:56	2:00
1st	MTL	Claude Provost	Holding	18:08	2:00
2nd	CHI	Al MacNeil	Charging	11:46	2:00
2nd	MTL	Jean Beliveau	Holding	11:46	2:00
2nd	MTL	Ralph Backstrom	High-sticking	17:02	2:00
2nd	CHI	Pierre Pilote	Charging	17:53	2:00
3rd	CHI	Stan Mikita	Cross-checking	07:59	2:00
3rd	MTL	Ted Harris	High-sticking	07:59	2:00
3rd	MTL	Claude Larose	Holding	09:35	2:00
3rd	CHI	Stan Mikita	Roughing	14:45	2:00
3rd	CHI	Doug Mohns	Roughing	14:45	2:00
3rd	MTL	Ted Harris	Roughing	14:45	2:00
3rd	MTL	Henri Richard	Roughing	14:45	2:00
3rd	CHI	Doug Mohns	Roughing	19:37	2:00
3rd	CHI	Matt Ravlich	Roughing	19:37	2:00
3rd	MTL	Ted Harris	Roughing	19:37	2:00
3rd	MTL	J. C. Tremblay	Roughing	19:37	2:00
3rd	MTL	J. C. Tremblay	Misconduct	19:37	10:00

Shots by period
Team	1	2	3	Total
Montreal	5	13	5	23
Chicago	9	8	11	28

=== Game four ===
April 25	Montreal Canadiens	1–5	Chicago Black Hawks	Chicago Stadium	Recap

Scoring summary
Period	Team	Goal	Assist(s)	Time	Score
1st	CHI	Fred Stanfield (2)	Unassisted	02:57	1–0 CHI
2nd	MTL	Jean Beliveau (2)	Dick Duff (2) and J. C. Tremblay (7)	06:29	1–1
3rd	CHI	Bobby Hull (9) – pp	Pierre Pilote (6)	00:26	2–1 CHI
3rd	CHI	Bill Hay (3) – pp	Fred Stanfield (1)	15:20	3–1 CHI
3rd	CHI	Bobby Hull (10)	Chico Maki (9)	18:48	4–1 CHI
3rd	CHI	Doug Jarrett (1)	Elmer Vasko (2)	19:57	5–1 CHI
Penalty summary
Period	Team	Player	Penalty	Time	PIM
1st	MTL	Jean-Guy Talbot	Holding	06:19	2:00
1st	MTL	Ted Harris	Charging	06:50	2:00
1st	CHI	Matt Ravlich	Tripping	09:45	2:00
1st	CHI	Pierre Pilote	Roughing	11:14	2:00
1st	MTL	Jean Beliveau	Roughing	11:14	2:00
1st	MTL	Red Berenson	Holding	14:05	2:00
1st	CHI	Stan Mikita	High-sticking	20:00	2:00
1st	MTL	Jean Beliveau	High-sticking	20:00	2:00
2nd	MTL	Claude Larose	Elbowing	03:03	2:00
2nd	CHI	Kenny Wharram	Roughing	04:56	2:00
2nd	MTL	Jean-Guy Talbot	Charging	04:56	2:00
2nd	MTL	Jean-Guy Talbot	Roughing	04:56	2:00
2nd	CHI	Matt Ravlich	High-sticking	06:12	2:00
2nd	MTL	Ted Harris	Elbowing	08:49	2:00
2nd	CHI	Elmer Vasko	Holding	14:51	2:00
2nd	MTL	Ted Harris	Holding	18:25	2:00
3rd	CHI	Bobby Hull	Charging	02:11	2:00
3rd	MTL	Jim Roberts	Roughing	06:55	2:00
3rd	MTL	Jim Roberts	Misconduct	06:55	10:00
3rd	CHI	Chico Maki	High-sticking	09:00	2:00
3rd	MTL	Jean-Guy Talbot	High-sticking	09:00	2:00
3rd	MTL	Jean Beliveau	High-sticking	11:51	2:00
3rd	MTL	Ted Harris	Elbowing	13:26	2:00
3rd	CHI	Elmer Vasko	Elbowing	16:17	2:00

Shots by period
Team	1	2	3	Total
Montreal	8	9	9	26
Chicago	11	9	8	28

=== Game five ===
April 27	Chicago Black Hawks	0–6	Montreal Canadiens	Montreal Forum	Recap

Scoring summary
Period	Team	Goal	Assist(s)	Time	Score
1st	MTL	Jean Beliveau (6) – pp	Bobby Rousseau (4) and Dick Duff (3)	07:14	1–0 MTL
1st	MTL	Dick Duff (2) – pp	Jean Beliveau (6) and Bobby Rousseau (5)	16:36	2–0 MTL
2nd	MTL	Bobby Rousseau (5) – pp	Jean Beliveau (7) and J. C. Tremblay (8)	02:38	3–0 MTL
3rd	MTL	Jean Beliveau (7) – pp	Dick Duff (4) and J. C. Tremblay (9)	04:29	4–0 MTL
3rd	MTL	Henri Richard (6)	Claude Provost (6)	06:46	5–0 MTL
3rd	MTL	J. C. Tremblay (5) – sh	Unassisted	19:55	6–0 MTL
Penalty summary
Period	Team	Player	Penalty	Time	PIM
1st	MTL	Claude Provost	Tripping	00:57	2:00
1st	CHI	Eric Nesterenko	High-sticking	04:25	2:00
1st	CHI	Eric Nesterenko	Roughing	04:25	2:00
1st	MTL	John Ferguson	Fighting – major	04:25	5:00
1st	CHI	Al MacNeil	Cross-checking	05:51	2:00
1st	MTL	Jean Beliveau	Holding	10:33	2:00
1st	CHI	Pierre Pilote	High-sticking	10:56	2:00
1st	MTL	Jean Beliveau	Slashing	13:54	2:00
1st	CHI	Bobby Hull	Elbowing	15:15	2:00
1st	MTL	John Ferguson	Hooking	17:59	2:00
2nd	CHI	Elmer Vasko	Hooking	01:18	2:00
2nd	MTL	Henri Richard	Hooking	13:59	2:00
3rd	CHI	Pierre Pilote	High-sticking	01:14	2:00
3rd	MTL	Henri Richard	High-sticking	01:14	2:00
3rd	CHI	Elmer Vasko	Hooking	03:21	2:00
3rd	CHI	Stan Mikita	High-sticking	10:40	2:00
3rd	MTL	Ralph Backstrom	High-sticking	10:40	2:00
3rd	CHI	Al MacNeil	Roughing	13:45	2:00
3rd	MTL	Henri Richard	Roughing	13:45	2:00
3rd	CHI	Pierre Pilote	Elbowing	15:35	2:00
3rd	MTL	Jim Roberts	Interference	18:45	2:00

Shots by period
Team	1	2	3	Total
Chicago	12	4	7	23
Montreal	12	12	13	37

=== Game six ===
April 29	Montreal Canadiens	1–2	Chicago Black Hawks	Chicago Stadium	Recap

Scoring summary
Period	Team	Goal	Assist(s)	Time	Score
1st	None				
2nd	MTL	Ralph Backstrom (2)	Ted Harris (7) and John Ferguson (1)	16:57	1–0 MTL
3rd	CHI	Elmer Vasko (1)	Doug Mohns (4) and Matt Ravlich (4)	06:06	1–1
3rd	CHI	Doug Mohns (3) – pp	Stan Mikita (7) and Pierre Pilote (7)	08:15	2–1 CHI
Penalty summary
Period	Team	Player	Penalty	Time	PIM
1st	CHI	Phil Esposito	High-sticking	01:34	2:00
1st	CHI	Phil Esposito	Roughing	01:34	2:00
1st	MTL	Henri Richard	Roughing	01:34	2:00
1st	CHI	Stan Mikita	High-sticking	06:41	2:00
1st	CHI	Stan Mikita	Fighting – major	06:41	5:00
1st	CHI	Stan Mikita	Misconduct	06:41	10:00
1st	CHI	Doug Mohns	Fighting – major	06:41	5:00
1st	MTL	Dick Duff	Fighting – major	06:41	5:00
1st	MTL	Terry Harper	Fighting – major	06:41	5:00
1st	MTL	Terry Harper	Misconduct	06:41	10:00
1st	MTL	Terry Harper	Delay of game (smothering puck)	06:41	2:00
1st	MTL	Ted Harris	Slashing	08:14	2:00
1st	CHI	Chico Maki	High-sticking	10:46	2:00
1st	MTL	Jean Gauthier	Hooking	14:41	2:00
2nd	CHI	Phil Esposito	Charging	09:15	2:00
2nd	MTL	Claude Provost	Hooking	12:28	2:00
3rd	MTL	Terry Harper	Holding	08:08	2:00
3rd	CHI	Chico Maki	Charging	17:43	2:00
3rd	MTL	Jean Gauthier	High-sticking	17:43	2:00

Shots by period
Team	1	2	3	Total
Montreal	5	8	9	22
Chicago	11	4	9	24

=== Game seven ===
May 1	Chicago Black Hawks	0–4	Montreal Canadiens	Montreal Forum	Recap

Scoring summary
Period	Team	Goal	Assist(s)	Time	Score
1st	MTL	Jean Beliveau (8)	Dick Duff (5) and Bobby Rousseau (6)	00:14	1–0 MTL
1st	MTL	Dick Duff (3)	Jean Beliveau (6) and Bobby Rousseau (5)	05:03	2–0 MTL
1st	MTL	Yvan Cournoyer (3) – pp	Dick Duff (6) and Bobby Rousseau (8)	16:27	3–0 MTL
1st	MTL	Henri Richard (7) – pp	Ted Harris (5)	18:45	4–0 MTL
2nd	None				
3rd	None				
Penalty summary
Period	Team	Player	Penalty	Time	PIM
1st	MTL	Ted Harris	Holding	07:55	2:00
1st	CHI	Pierre Pilote	Hooking	16:08	2:00
1st	CHI	Phil Esposito	Hooking	18:00	2:00
1st	MTL	Ted Harris	Elbowing	19:56	2:00
1st	MTL	Ted Harris	Misconduct	19:56	10:00
2nd	CHI	Eric Nesterenko	Hooking	07:11	2:00
2nd	CHI	Doug Jarrett	Charging	17:42	2:00
3rd	CHI	Elmer Vasko	High-sticking	04:03	2:00
3rd	MTL	Henri Richard	Slashing	04:03	2:00
3rd	CHI	Stan Mikita	Slashing	06:16	2:00
3rd	CHI	Doug Mohns	Holding	09:16	2:00
3rd	MTL	Claude Provost	Hooking	14:23	2:00
3rd	MTL	Jean Beliveau	Tripping	17:39	2:00
3rd	CHI	Camille Henry	High-sticking	18:30	2:00
3rd	MTL	Claude Provost	Hooking	19:27	2:00

Shots by period
Team	1	2	3	Total
Chicago	9	6	5	20
Montreal	15	12	8	35

== Stanley Cup engraving ==
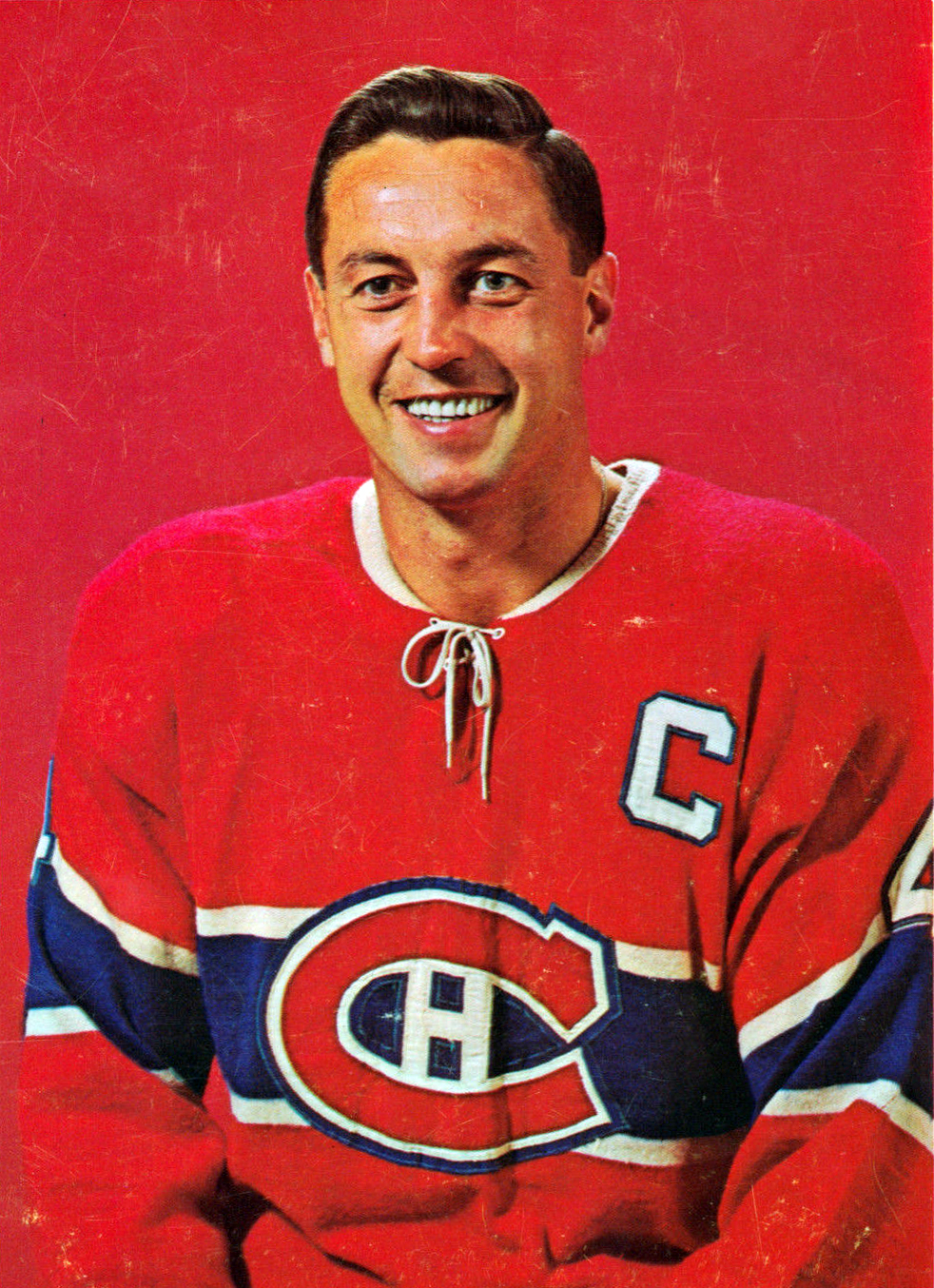
Jean Beliveau scored the game-winning goal in Game 7 and awarded the first Conn Smythe Trophy for his efforts in the playoffs, where he had eight goals and eight assists.

The 1965 Stanley Cup was presented to Canadiens captain Jean Beliveau by NHL President Clarence Campbell following the Canadiens 4–0 win over the Black Hawks in game seven.

The following Canadiens players and staff had their names engraved on the Stanley Cup

1964–65 Montreal Canadiens

=== Players ===
Centres

- 4 Jean Beliveau (Captain)
- 6 Ralph Backstrom
- 16 Henri Richard (A)
- 23 Gordon Red Berenson
- 23-24 Garry Peters*

Wingers

- 8 Dick Duff
- 12 Yvan Cournoyer
- 11 Claude Larose
- 14 Claude Provost
- 15 Bobby Rousseau
- 20 Dave Balon
- 21 Gilles Tremblay*
- 22 John Ferguson Sr.
- 26 Jim Roberts

Defencemen

- 2 Jacques Laperriere
- 3 Jean-Claude J. C. Tremblay
- 10 Edward Ted Harris
- 17 Jean-Guy Talbot (A)
- 18 Bryan Watson*
- 19 Terry Harper
- 24 Jean Gauthier
- 24-25 Noel Picard

Goaltenders

- 1 Charlie Hodge
- 29 Ernie Wakely*
- 30 Lorne Gump Worsley
- * Did not officially qualify, but name still engraved on the Stanley Cup.^{[A]}

=== Coaching and administrative staff ===
- Hartland Molson (Chairman/owner)
- J. David Molson (President), Maurice Rocket Richard (Asst to President)
- Sam Pollock (Vice President/Manager), Toe Blake (Coach)
- Andy Galley (Trainer), Larry Albut (Asst. Trainer)

=== Stanley Cup engraving ===
- ^{^A} Four players who did not officially qualify had their names engraved on the Stanley Cup.
  - #21 Gilles Tremblay (LW) – played in 25 regular-season games and missed the rest of the season injured.
  - #23-24 Garry Peters (C) – played in 13 regular-season games. Spent most of the season in the minors.
  - #18 Bryan Watson (D) – played in 8 regular-season games. Spent most of the season in the minors.
  - #29 Ernie Wakely (G) – dressed but did not play in the regular season. Wakely was dressed for games 3-4-5 (of 5) in the Stanley Cup Semi-Finals due to Charlie Hodge being injured.
- When Toronto won the Stanley Cup in 1962, 1963, and 1964, they took up more room than was allowed for engraving their winning members' names on it. So when Montreal won the Stanley Cup, the ring was finished off with 32 members. Had the ring been engraved correctly in 1964–65, there would have been more than enough room to include all 27 members of the Montreal Canadiens' 1965–66 roster with their full first and last names and non-playing positions.

== See also ==
- 1964–65 NHL season

== Notes ==
Preceded by Toronto Maple Leafs; 1964	Montreal Canadiens; Stanley Cup champions 1965	Succeeded by Montreal Canadiens; 1966
