= 1964–65 Chicago Black Hawks season =

National Hockey League team season

1964–65 Chicago Black Hawks
- League: 2nd NHL
- 1964–65 record: 34–28–8
- Home record: 20–13–2
- Road record: 14–15–6
- Goals for: 224
- Goals against: 176

Team information
- General manager: Tommy Ivan
- Coach: Billy Reay
- Captain: Pierre Pilote
- Alternate captains: Stan Mikita
- Arena: Chicago Stadium

Team leaders
- Goals: Bobby Hull (39)
- Assists: Stan Mikita (59)
- Points: Stan Mikita (87)
- Penalty minutes: Pierre Pilote (162)
- Wins: Glenn Hall (18)
- Goals against average: Glenn Hall (2.43)

The 1964–65 Chicago Black Hawks season was the Hawks' 39th season in the NHL, and followed a second-place finish in 1963–64. Chicago won a team record of 36 games and also set a club record with 84 points. The Hawks defeated the Detroit Red Wings in seven games in the NHL semifinals but fell to the Montreal Canadiens in the Stanley Cup Final in another hard-fought seven-game series.

== Offseason ==
During off-season, the Black Hawks and Boston Bruins made a trade, as Chicago sent Ab McDonald, Reg Fleming, and Murray Balfour to the Bruins for Doug Mohns. The Hawks also made a few key signings, as they signed Dennis Hull, the younger brother of Bobby Hull, along with young defenseman Doug Jarrett.

== Regular season ==
Chicago started the season off slowly, as they opened the year with a record of 8–11–2 in their opening 21 games, however, the Hawks broke out of their slump, and went on a 13-game unbeaten streak. Bobby Hull was scoring in bunches, as he had 25 goals in his first 26 games. Chicago stayed hot, as they would reach a high point of 12 games over .500 when their record was 32–20–7, however, the Hawks limped into the playoffs, going 2–8–1 in their last 11 games, as they finished the year with a 34–28–8 record, earning 76 points, which was their lowest point total since 1961–62.

Offensively, the Hawks were led by Stan Mikita, who won his second consecutive Art Ross Trophy, as he led the league with 87 points, as he scored 28 goals and added 59 assists. Bobby Hull, who got off to that hot start, suffered an injury in early February, as he ended up missing nine games, and finished the season with 39 goals and 71 points. Hull ended up winning the Hart Memorial Trophy, which is awarded to the MVP of the NHL. Phil Esposito, in his second season in the NHL, broke out with 23 goals and 55 points, while Kenny Wharram had another solid season, scoring 24 goals and 44 points. On the blueline, Pierre Pilote once again led the way, scoring 14 goals and 59 points, while registering a team high 162 penalty minutes, and a third consecutive Norris Trophy.

In goal, Glenn Hall had his playing time cut back, as he appeared in 41 games, winning a club high 18 games, while posting a team best 2.43 GAA, and 4 shutouts. Backup goaltender Denis DeJordy played in 30 games, winning 16, while posting a 2.52 GAA, and earning 3 shutouts.

=== Season standings ===
Pos	Team	Pld	W	L	T	GF	GA	GD	Pts
1	Detroit Red Wings	70	40	23	7	224	175	+49	87
2	Montreal Canadiens	70	36	23	11	211	185	+26	83
3	Chicago Black Hawks	70	34	28	8	224	176	+48	76
4	Toronto Maple Leafs	70	30	26	14	204	173	+31	74
5	New York Rangers	70	20	38	12	179	246	−67	52
6	Boston Bruins	70	21	43	6	166	253	−87	48

Source: National Hockey League

=== Record vs. opponents ===
1964–65 NHL Records
Team	BOS	CHI	DET	MTL	NYR	TOR
Boston	—	6–8	3–10–1	3–10–1	5–8–1	4–7–3
Chicago	8–6	—	8–5–1	5–6–3	9–3–2	4–8–2
Detroit	10–3–1	5–8–1	—	8–4–2	10–2–2	7–6–1
Montreal	10–3–1	6–5–3	4–8–2	—	10–2–2	6–5–3
New York	8–5–1	3–9–2	2–10–2	2–10–2	—	5–4–5
Toronto	7–4–3	8–4–2	6–7–1	5–6–3	4–5–5	—

== Schedule and results ==
1964–65 regular season
October

Game	Date	Visitor	Score	Home	Record	Points
1	October 14	Boston Bruins	0–3	Chicago Black Hawks	1–0–0	2
2	October 17	Detroit Red Wings	2–4	Chicago Black Hawks	2–0–0	4
3	October 18	Chicago Black Hawks	2–3	Detroit Red Wings	2–1–0	4
4	October 21	Chicago Black Hawks	5–5	Montreal Canadiens	2–1–1	5
5	October 25	Chicago Black Hawks	5–2	New York Rangers	3–1–1	7
6	October 27	Toronto Maple Leafs	3–2	Chicago Black Hawks	3–2–1	7
7	October 31	Chicago Black Hawks	1–5	Toronto Maple Leafs	3–3–1	7

November

Game	Date	Visitor	Score	Home	Record	Points
8	November 1	Chicago Black Hawks	2–5	Boston Bruins	3–4–1	7
9	November 3	New York Rangers	1–2	Chicago Black Hawks	4–4–1	9
10	November 7	Chicago Black Hawks	3–1	Montreal Canadiens	5–4–1	11
11	November 8	Chicago Black Hawks	2–3	Boston Bruins	5–5–1	11
12	November 11	Montreal Canadiens	4–1	Chicago Black Hawks	5–6–1	11
13	November 15	Toronto Maple Leafs	2–4	Chicago Black Hawks	6–6–1	13
14	November 18	Detroit Red Wings	1–3	Chicago Black Hawks	7–6–1	15
15	November 21	Chicago Black Hawks	0–1	Toronto Maple Leafs	7–7–1	15
16	November 22	Montreal Canadiens	2–6	Chicago Black Hawks	8–7–1	17
17	November 26	Toronto Maple Leafs	4–2	Chicago Black Hawks	8–8–1	17
18	November 29	Boston Bruins	4–3	Chicago Black Hawks	8–9–1	17

December

Game	Date	Visitor	Score	Home	Record	Points
19	December 2	Chicago Black Hawks	3–3	New York Rangers	8–9–2	18
20	December 5	Chicago Black Hawks	3–5	Montreal Canadiens	8–10–2	18
21	December 6	New York Rangers	4–1	Chicago Black Hawks	8–11–2	18
22	December 9	Chicago Black Hawks	6–1	New York Rangers	9–11–2	20
23	December 10	Chicago Black Hawks	5–1	Boston Bruins	10–11–2	22
24	December 12	Chicago Black Hawks	3–2	Detroit Red Wings	11–11–2	24
25	December 13	Detroit Red Wings	0–5	Chicago Black Hawks	12–11–2	26
26	December 15	Boston Bruins	5–7	Chicago Black Hawks	13–11–2	28
27	December 19	Chicago Black Hawks	6–3	Montreal Canadiens	14–11–2	30
28	December 20	Chicago Black Hawks	3–2	Boston Bruins	15–11–2	32
29	December 25	Toronto Maple Leafs	3–3	Chicago Black Hawks	15–11–3	33
30	December 26	Chicago Black Hawks	5–3	Toronto Maple Leafs	16–11–3	35
31	December 27	Boston Bruins	2–6	Chicago Black Hawks	17–11–3	37
32	December 29	Chicago Black Hawks	4–2	New York Rangers	18–11–3	39
33	December 31	Chicago Black Hawks	1–1	Detroit Red Wings	18–11–4	40

January

Game	Date	Visitor	Score	Home	Record	Points
34	January 1	New York Rangers	1–2	Chicago Black Hawks	19–11–4	42
35	January 3	Montreal Canadiens	2–1	Chicago Black Hawks	19–12–4	42
36	January 6	Toronto Maple Leafs	3–1	Chicago Black Hawks	19–13–4	42
37	January 9	Chicago Black Hawks	7–4	Detroit Red Wings	20–13–4	44
38	January 10	Detroit Red Wings	2–3	Chicago Black Hawks	21–13–4	46
39	January 13	Chicago Black Hawks	0–0	Toronto Maple Leafs	21–13–5	47
40	January 16	New York Rangers	6–3	Chicago Black Hawks	21–14–5	47
41	January 17	Montreal Canadiens	4–2	Chicago Black Hawks	21–15–5	47
42	January 20	Boston Bruins	1–7	Chicago Black Hawks	22–15–5	49
43	January 24	New York Rangers	2–7	Chicago Black Hawks	23–15–5	51
44	January 27	Chicago Black Hawks	0–2	Montreal Canadiens	23–16–5	51
45	January 28	Chicago Black Hawks	6–2	Boston Bruins	24–16–5	53
46	January 30	Chicago Black Hawks	1–3	Detroit Red Wings	24–17–5	53
47	January 31	Montreal Canadiens	0–3	Chicago Black Hawks	25–17–5	55

February

Game	Date	Visitor	Score	Home	Record	Points
48	February 3	Chicago Black Hawks	4–1	New York Rangers	26–17–5	57
49	February 6	Chicago Black Hawks	6–3	Toronto Maple Leafs	27–17–5	59
50	February 7	Toronto Maple Leafs	2–1	Chicago Black Hawks	27–18–5	59
51	February 10	Detroit Red Wings	2–5	Chicago Black Hawks	28–18–5	61
52	February 11	Chicago Black Hawks	3–5	Detroit Red Wings	28–19–5	61
53	February 13	Chicago Black Hawks	3–0	New York Rangers	29–19–5	63
54	February 14	Montreal Canadiens	2–2	Chicago Black Hawks	29–19–6	64
55	February 17	New York Rangers	4–5	Chicago Black Hawks	30–19–6	66
56	February 20	Chicago Black Hawks	3–4	Toronto Maple Leafs	30–20–6	66
57	February 21	Boston Bruins	0–7	Chicago Black Hawks	31–20–6	68
58	February 24	Detroit Red Wings	2–3	Chicago Black Hawks	32–20–6	70
59	February 27	Chicago Black Hawks	3–3	Montreal Canadiens	32–20–7	71
60	February 28	Boston Bruins	5–4	Chicago Black Hawks	32–21–7	71

March

Game	Date	Visitor	Score	Home	Record	Points
61	March 3	Detroit Red Wings	2–0	Chicago Black Hawks	32–22–7	71
62	March 6	Chicago Black Hawks	1–4	Toronto Maple Leafs	32–23–7	71
63	March 7	Montreal Canadiens	0–7	Chicago Black Hawks	33–23–7	73
64	March 10	Chicago Black Hawks	1–1	New York Rangers	33–23–8	74
65	March 14	Toronto Maple Leafs	3–5	Chicago Black Hawks	34–23–8	76
66	March 17	Chicago Black Hawks	1–2	Boston Bruins	34–24–8	76
67	March 20	Chicago Black Hawks	2–3	Montreal Canadiens	34–25–8	76
68	March 21	Chicago Black Hawks	1–5	Detroit Red Wings	34–26–8	76
69	March 23	New York Rangers	3–2	Chicago Black Hawks	34–27–8	76
70	March 28	Chicago Black Hawks	1–3	Boston Bruins	34–28–8	76

Legend: Win (2 points) Loss (0 points) Tie (1 point)

== Playoffs ==
The Hawks would face the Detroit Red Wings in the NHL semi-finals for the third consecutive season, as Detroit finished first in the NHL with a record of 40–23–7, earning 87 points, which was 11 more than the third place Black Hawks. The series opened up at the Detroit Olympia, and the Red Wings took control of the series, winning the opening two games by scores 4–3 and 6–3. The series shifted to Chicago Stadium for the next two games, and the Black Hawks took advantage of their home ice, winning both games by scores of 5–2 and 2–1 to even the series up. The fifth game was played in Detroit, and the Red Wings won the game 4–2, and took a 3–2 series lead. Game six was in Chicago, and again, the home team won the game, as Chicago shutout the Red Wings 4–0, setting up a seventh game at the Olympia. The Black Hawks skated into Detroit, and completed the upset, as Chicago doubled the Wings 4–2, and advanced to the Stanley Cup Final for the first time since 1962.

Chicago's opponent in the 1965 Stanley Cup Final was the Montreal Canadiens, who finished second in the league with a record of 36–23–11, earning 83 points, which was seven more than the Hawks. The Canadiens defeated the Toronto Maple Leafs in the NHL semi-finals to earn a spot in the Stanley Cup Final. The series opened at the Montreal Forum for the opening two games, and the Canadiens quickly opened up a 2–0 series lead, with wins of 3–2 and 2–0. The series moved to Chicago for the next two games, and the Black Hawks once again took advantage of their home ice, evening the series up with 3–1 and 5–1 victories. Montreal was the site of the fifth game, and the Canadiens once again took the series lead, shutting out Chicago 6–0. The sixth game was in Chicago, and the Black Hawks stayed red hot on home ice, defeating Montreal 2–1, and finished the playoffs with a 6–0 record at home. However, the seventh and final game of the series was in Montreal, and the Black Hawks road woes continued, as the Canadiens shut out Chicago 4–0, to win the Stanley Cup.

1965 Stanley Cup playoffs
Semifinals vs. (1) Detroit Red Wings – Black Hawks win 4–3

Game	Date	Visitor	Score	Home	Series
1	April 1	Chicago Black Hawks	3–4	Detroit Red Wings	0–1
2	April 4	Chicago Black Hawks	3–6	Detroit Red Wings	0–2
3	April 6	Detroit Red Wings	2–5	Chicago Black Hawks	1–2
4	April 8	Detroit Red Wings	1–2	Chicago Black Hawks	2–2
5	April 11	Chicago Black Hawks	2–4	Detroit Red Wings	2–3
6	April 13	Detroit Red Wings	0–4	Chicago Black Hawks	3–3
7	April 15	Chicago Black Hawks	4–2	Detroit Red Wings	4–3

Stanley Cup Finals vs. (2) Montreal Canadiens – Canadiens win 4–3

Game	Date	Visitor	Score	Home	Series
1	April 17	Chicago Black Hawks	2–3	Montreal Canadiens	0–1
2	April 20	Chicago Black Hawks	0–2	Montreal Canadiens	0–2
3	April 22	Montreal Canadiens	1–3	Chicago Black Hawks	1–2
4	April 25	Montreal Canadiens	1–5	Chicago Black Hawks	2–2
5	April 27	Chicago Black Hawks	0–6	Montreal Canadiens	2–3
6	April 29	Montreal Canadiens	1–2	Chicago Black Hawks	3–3
7	May 1	Chicago Black Hawks	0–4	Montreal Canadiens	3–4

Legend: Win Loss

== Player stats ==
=== Regular season ===
Scoring

Player	GP	G	A	Pts	PIM
Stan Mikita	70	28	59	87	154
Bobby Hull	61	39	32	71	32
Pierre Pilote	68	14	45	59	162
Phil Esposito	70	23	32	55	44
Kenny Wharram	68	24	20	44	27

Goaltending

Player	GP	TOI	W	L	T	GA	SO	GAA
Glenn Hall	41	2440	18	17	5	99	4	2.43
Denis DeJordy	30	1760	16	11	3	74	3	2.52

=== Playoff stats ===
Scoring leaders

Player	GP	G	A	Pts	PIM
Bobby Hull	14	10	7	17	27
Chico Maki	14	3	9	12	8
Stan Mikita	14	3	7	10	53
Doug Mohns	14	3	4	7	21
Pierre Pilote	14	0	7	7	22

Goaltending

Player	GP	TOI	W	L	GA	SO	GAA
Glenn Hall	13	760	7	6	28	1	2.21
Denis DeJordy	2	80	0	1	9	0	6.75

== Draft picks ==
Chicago's draft picks at the 1964 NHL entry draft held at the Queen Elizabeth Hotel in Montreal.

Round	#	Player	Nationality	College/junior/club team (league)
1	4	Richie Bayes	Canada	Dixie Midgets
2	10	Jan Popiel	Denmark	Georgetown Midgets
3	16	Carl Hadfield	Canada	Dixie (Junior B)
4	22	Moe L'Abbe	Canada	Rosemount Midgets

== Sources ==
- Hockey-Reference
- Rauzulu's Street
- Goalies Archive
- HockeyDB
- National Hockey League Guide & Record Book 2007
