= 1964–65 NHL season =

National Hockey League season

- League: National Hockey League
- Sport: Ice hockey
- Duration: October 12, 1964 – May 1, 1965
- Games: 70
- Teams: 6
- TV partner(s): CBC, SRC (Canada); None (United States)

Draft
- Top draft pick: Claude Gauthier
- Picked by: Detroit Red Wings

Regular season
- Season champion: Detroit Red Wings
- Season MVP: Bobby Hull (Black Hawks)
- Top scorer: Stan Mikita (Black Hawks)

Playoffs
- Playoffs MVP: Jean Beliveau (Canadiens)

Stanley Cup
- Champions: Montreal Canadiens
- Runners-up: Chicago Black Hawks

NHL seasons
- ← 1963–64 1965–66 →

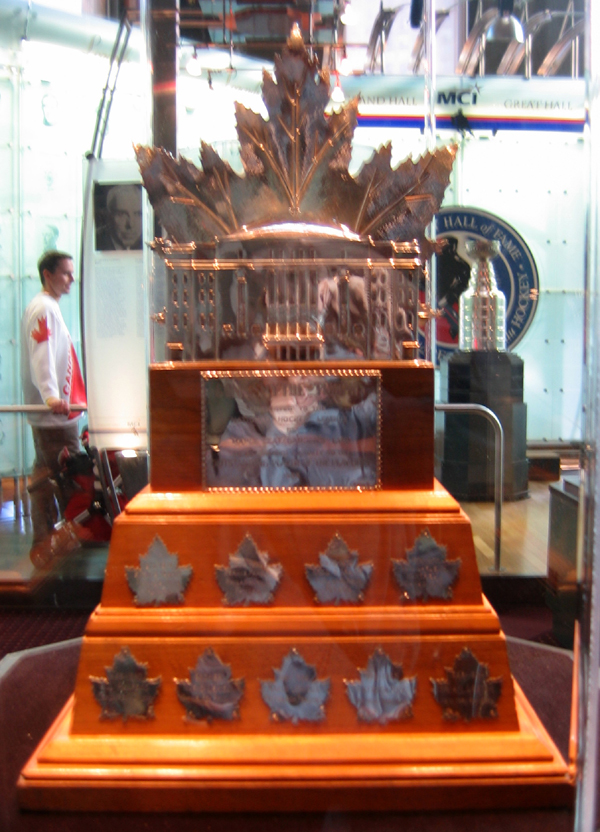
Conn Smythe Trophy at the Hockey Hall of Fame in Toronto

The 1964–65 NHL season was the 48th season of the National Hockey League. Six teams played 70 games each. Jean Beliveau was the winner of the newly introduced Conn Smythe Trophy as the most valuable player during the playoffs. The Montreal Canadiens won their first Stanley Cup since 1960 as they were victorious over the Chicago Black Hawks in a seven-game final series.

== League business ==
The second NHL amateur draft was held on June 11, 1964, at the Queen Elizabeth Hotel in Montreal, Quebec. Claude Gauthier was selected first overall by the Detroit Red Wings.

The Canadian Amateur Hockey Association (CAHA) wanted to end the NHL's system of sponsoring junior ice hockey teams and instead allow all players who graduated from junior hockey to be chosen in the NHL amateur draft. The CAHA felt that the sponsorship system concentrated talent on a small number of teams and sought for the NHL to spread out that money it invested equally among the junior leagues and branches in Canada. CAHA president Lionel Fleury wanted a junior-aged player to complete an education, rather than be encouraged to quit schooling to focus on playing hockey. In December 1964, he presented the CAHA's proposal to the NHL for a new draft system which would allow players remain in junior hockey until age 20 instead of the NHL obtaining the player's rights at age 18. Discussions remained unresolved until a new agreement with the requested changes was reached in August 1966.

== Regular season ==
Important new additions by Chicago were Bobby Hull's brother Dennis Hull and defenceman Doug Jarrett, and they traded Reg Fleming, Ab McDonald and Murray Balfour to Boston in exchange for Doug Mohns.

Frank Selke retired as general manager of the Montreal Canadiens post which Sam Pollock, took over as general manager.

Ted Lindsay decided to make a comeback with Detroit and though Toronto beat Detroit in the opener 5–3, the Olympia fans gave him an ovation.

This was the first season the Conn Smythe Trophy was awarded for the most valuable player in the Stanley Cup playoffs.

Muzz Patrick resigned as general manager of the New York Rangers and Emile Francis, assistant general manager, took his place. On January 27, 1965, Ulf Sterner, the first European trained player, made his debut in the National Hockey League for the New York Rangers in a game versus the Boston Bruins.

Ron Ellis was proving to be a find and he scored two goals when the Leafs downed Chicago 5–1 on October 31.

Frank Mahovlich entered a hospital for psychiatric treatment under great stress from fans and his manager Punch Imlach who expected more of him than he was delivering. He could not stand the pressure of playing.

After stopping a shot with his foot, Marcel Pronovost missed a few games and Detroit sorely missed him, as on December 5, Toronto clobbered the Red Wings 10–2. Bob Pulford was clipped by Gordie Howe's club when it was knocked upward and it hit Pulford in the eye.

Frank Mahovlich was back on December 9 when Montreal downed Toronto 3–2. Three nights later, he had two goals and two assists when Toronto beat Boston 6–3.

Chicago defeated Boston 7–5 on December 16 and Bobby Hull got two goals. He now had 25 goals in 26 games. The Black Hawks were now alternating Glenn Hall and Denis DeJordy in goal.

On December 22, Montreal traded Bill Hicke and Jean-Guy Morissette to New York in exchange for Dick Duff and Dave McComb.

On December 26, Bill Thoms, who played 12 years with Toronto and Chicago, died of a heart attack, aged 54.

Toronto's Punch Imlach ruled with an iron hand and was really upset with the Leafs play. Wholesale demotions were threatened if the team's play did not improve. Toronto snapped out of its decline when they beat Detroit 3–1 on January 2. Tim Horton scored two goals playing as a forward instead of his usual defence position. Roger Crozier was struck in the eye by Jim Pappin's stick late in the game and was replaced by Carl Wetzel in goal. Ted Lindsay got into a heated argument with referee Vern Buffey over whether a penalty should be called against Pappin and received a ten-minute misconduct penalty and a game misconduct. Lindsay stated to the press after the game that his advice to coach Sid Abel was not to pay the fines and that he would not sit still for NHL president Clarence Campbell's kangaroo court. All this was reported to Campbell who said Lindsay would pay the fines or not play. In due course, an appropriate signed apology and a cheque in the amount of the fines were handed over by Lindsay and he was reinstated January 6.

Bill Hicke, who had been traded to the Rangers by the Canadiens, turned on his ex-teammates with a hat trick at the Montreal Forum on January 9 as the Rangers won 6–5. However, the Rangers lost defenceman Jim Neilson with a shoulder separation. The Rangers got walloped by the Leafs 6–0 the next night as Tim Horton had two goals. Despite the win, the fans were still chanting "We want Shack!" (meaning Eddie Shack).

George Hayes, who had been an official in the NHL for 19 years, was suspended for refusing to take an eye test. Later, he had his contract terminated when he still refused. Referee-in-chief Carl Voss announced his intention to resign at the end of the season, and Hayes and ex-referee Eddie Powers greeted this with approval.

Chicago moved into first place with a 4–1 win on February 3 over the New York Rangers right at Madison Square Garden. Bobby Hull did not score, but the highlight of the game was his fight with Bob Plager.

Chicago beat Toronto 6–3 on February 6 and Bobby Hull's chances of reaching 50 goals was in trouble when he was checked heavily by Bobby Baun, and he limped from the ice with strained knee ligaments. On the same weekend, Detroit moved into first place, beating Montreal twice.

The Leafs pulled into a tie with Montreal for second place when they pasted Montreal 6–2 in Toronto on February 10. This was the fifth straight loss for the Habs. Referee Bill Friday had a busy time with a bench-clearing brawl that delayed the game for 20 minutes. The trouble began when John Ferguson hooked Frank Mahovlich. Terry Harper, Ted Harris, Pete Stemkowski and Kent Douglas moved in and then the benches emptied. Referee Friday assessed 66 minutes in penalties, including ten minute misconducts to Mahovlich and Ted Harris. President Campbell later assessed $925 in fines. Ten Leafs were fined $50 each and six Canadiens players were fined $50.

Red Kelly had the hat trick on March 21 when Toronto pummeled the Rangers 10–1.

The Rangers beat the Black Hawks on March 23 3–2. A great many fans were upset at plans for a closed circuit telecast of Chicago games and during the game there were shouts of "Norris is a fink!" (referring to James D. Norris, part owner of the Black Hawks).

Detroit finished first for the first time since 1956–57 when they beat the Rangers 7–4 on March 25. Alex Delvecchio had the hat trick and Norm Ullman scored two goals.

=== Final standings ===
Pos	Team	Pld	W	L	T	GF	GA	GD	Pts
1	Detroit Red Wings	70	40	23	7	224	175	+49	87
2	Montreal Canadiens	70	36	23	11	211	185	+26	83
3	Chicago Black Hawks	70	34	28	8	224	176	+48	76
4	Toronto Maple Leafs	70	30	26	14	204	173	+31	74
5	New York Rangers	70	20	38	12	179	246	−67	52
6	Boston Bruins	70	21	43	6	166	253	−87	48

Source: National Hockey League

== Playoffs ==
The NHL required all teams to carry two goaltenders for the playoffs.

=== Playoff bracket ===
The top four teams in the league qualified for the playoffs. In the semifinals, the first-place team played the third-place team, while the second-place team faced the fourth-place team, with the winners advancing to the Stanley Cup Finals. In both rounds, teams competed in a best-of-seven series (scores in the bracket indicate the number of games won in each best-of-seven series).

Semifinals
1	Detroit	3
3	Chicago	4
2	Montreal	4
4	Toronto	2

Stanley Cup Finals
3	Chicago	3
2	Montreal	4

=== Semifinals ===
For the third straight year, it was Montreal vs. Toronto and Detroit vs. Chicago in the first round. The Canadiens came out on top over the defending champion Leafs in six games, while the Hawks beat the Wings in seven.

==== (1) Detroit Red Wings vs. (3) Chicago Black Hawks ====
April 1	Chicago Black Hawks	3–4	Detroit Red Wings	Olympia Stadium	Recap
Bobby Hull (1) – pp – 16:45		First period	12:51 – Floyd Smith (1)
Phil Esposito (1) – 04:12		Second period	11:54 – pp – Alex Delvecchio (1)
Chico Maki (1) – pp – 01:01		Third period	12:13 – pp – Alex Delvecchio (2); 15:13 – Norm Ullman (1)
Glenn Hall 32 saves / 36 shots		Goalie stats	Roger Crozier 29 saves / 32 shots

April 4	Chicago Black Hawks	3–6	Detroit Red Wings	Olympia Stadium	Recap
Fred Stanfield (1) – 01:29		First period	08:44 – Al Langlois (1)
No scoring		Second period	07:06 – pp – Norm Ullman (2); 15:36 – sh – Gordie Howe (1)
Bobby Hull (2) – 01:22; Bobby Hull (2) – pp – 04:13		Third period	00:56 – pp – Gordie Howe (2); 09:12 – pp – Eddie Joyal (1); 15:11 – pp – Parker MacDonald (1)
Denis DeJordy 29 saves / 35 shots		Goalie stats	Roger Crozier 20 saves / 23 shots

April 6	Detroit Red Wings	2–5	Chicago Black Hawks	Chicago Stadium	Recap
Ted Lindsay (1) – 11:00		First period	05:21 – pp – Bill Hay (1); 06:50 – Stan Mikita (1); 08:01 – Doug Mohns (1)
Ted Lindsay (2) – 02:33		Second period	18:42 – Bobby Hull (4)
No scoring		Third period	06:49 – Bobby Hull (5)
Roger Crozier 11 saves / 16 shots		Goalie stats	Glenn Hall 28 saves / 30 shots

April 8	Detroit Red Wings	1–2	Chicago Black Hawks	Chicago Stadium	Recap
Gordie Howe (3) – pp – 09:25		First period	07:57 – pp – Chico Maki (2)
No scoring		Second period	No scoring
No scoring		Third period	09:12 – Bobby Hull (6)
Roger Crozier 26 saves / 28 shots		Goalie stats	Glenn Hall 27 saves / 28 shots

April 11	Chicago Black Hawks	2–4	Detroit Red Wings	Olympia Stadium	Recap
Eric Nesterenko (1) – 08:37		First period	19:19 – pp – Ted Lindsay (3)
Bobby Hull (7) – 14:59		Second period	17:35 – Norm Ullman (3); 17:40 – Norm Ullman (4)
No scoring		Third period	17:59 – Norm Ullman (5)
Glenn Hall 26 saves / 30 shots		Goalie stats	Roger Crozier 23 saves / 25 shots

April 13	Detroit Red Wings	0–4	Chicago Black Hawks	Chicago Stadium	Recap
No scoring		First period	No scoring
No scoring		Second period	03:18 – Kenny Wharram (1)
No scoring		Third period	12:18 – Phil Esposito (2); 15:15 – Stan Mikita (2); 16:48 – sh – Bill Hay (2)
Roger Crozier 28 saves / 32 shots		Goalie stats	Glenn Hall 33 saves / 33 shots

April 15	Chicago Black Hawks	4–2	Detroit Red Wings	Olympia Stadium	Recap
No scoring		First period	07:04 – pp – Norm Ullman (6); 16:35 – Gordie Howe (4)
Bobby Hull (8) – pp – 08:52; Doug Mohns (2) – 18:09		Second period	No scoring
Stan Mikita (3) – 09:42; Eric Nesterenko (2) – 14:15		Third period	No scoring
Glenn Hall 21 saves / 23 shots		Goalie stats	Roger Crozier 27 saves / 31 shots

Chicago won series 4–3

==== (2) Montreal Canadiens vs. (4) Toronto Maple Leafs ====
April 1	Toronto Maple Leafs	2–3	Montreal Canadiens	Montreal Forum	Recap
No scoring		First period	11:02 – pp – Henri Richard (1); 14:34 – Ralph Backstrom (1)
No scoring		Second period	No scoring
Dickie Moore (1) – 08:04; Carl Brewer (1) – 10:46		Third period	12:29 – pp – Bobby Rousseau (1)
Johnny Bower 35 saves / 38 shots		Goalie stats	Charlie Hodge 24 saves / 26 shots

April 3	Toronto Maple Leafs	1–3	Montreal Canadiens	Montreal Forum	Recap
No scoring		First period	02:47 – pp – Claude Provost (1)
Ron Ellis (1) – 10:43		Second period	19:12 – pp – Jean Beliveau (1)
No scoring		Third period	12:12 – Henri Richard (2)
Terry Sawchuck 36 saves / 39 shots		Goalie stats	Charlie Hodge 31 saves / 32 shots

April 6	Montreal Canadiens	2–3	OT	Toronto Maple Leafs	Maple Leaf Gardens	Recap
Jean Beliveau (2) – 17:02		First period		No scoring
No scoring		Second period		03:19 – Eddie Shack (1)
Henri Richard (3) – pp – 00:47		Third period		07:50 – pp – Andy Bathgate (1)
No scoring		First overtime period		04:17 – Dave Keon (1)
Gump Worsley 30 saves / 33 shots		Goalie stats		Johnny Bower 26 saves / 28 shots

April 8	Montreal Canadiens	2–4	Toronto Maple Leafs	Maple Leaf Gardens	Recap
Bobby Rousseau (2) – pp – 03:48; Henri Richard (4) – pp – 05:45		First period	No scoring
No scoring		Second period	15:22 – pp – Red Kelly (1)
No scoring		Third period	05:16 – Ron Ellis (2); 05:56 – George Armstrong (1); 19:32 – en – Red Kelly (2)
Gump Worsley 29 saves / 32 shots		Goalie stats	Johnny Bower 24 saves / 26 shots

April 10	Toronto Maple Leafs	1–3	Montreal Canadiens	Montreal Forum	Recap
No scoring		First period	No scoring
Bob Pulford (1) – 03:45		Second period	12:05 – pp – Yvan Cournoyer (1)
No scoring		Third period	07:30 – Bobby Rousseau (3); 19:16 – en – Jean Beliveau (3)
Johnny Bower 21 saves / 23 shots		Goalie stats	Gump Worsley 27 saves / 28 shots

April 13	Montreal Canadiens	4–3	OT	Toronto Maple Leafs	Maple Leaf Gardens	Recap
John Ferguson (1) – pp – 03:32		First period		02:10 – sh – Dave Keon (2); 03:11 – sh – Red Kelly (3); 03:49 – Ron Ellis (3)
Jacques Laperriere (1) – pp – 09:20		Second period		No scoring
Bobby Rousseau (4) – pp – 06:27		Third period		No scoring
Claude Provost (2) – 16:33		First overtime period		No scoring
Gump Worsley 34 saves / 37 shots		Goalie stats		Johnny Bower 31 saves / 35 shots

Montreal won series 4–2

=== Stanley Cup Finals ===
In the Finals, the Canadiens defeated the Black Hawks in seven games.

April 17	Chicago Black Hawks	2–3	Montreal Canadiens	Montreal Forum	Recap
No scoring		First period	No scoring
Camille Henry (1) – pp – 04:47		Second period	02:39 – Henri Richard (5); 05:26 – John Ferguson (2)
Matt Ravlich (1) – pp – 02:38		Third period	08:59 – pp – Yvan Cournoyer (2)
Glenn Hall 28 saves / 31 shots		Goalie stats	Gump Worsley 22 saves / 24 shots

April 20	Chicago Black Hawks	0–2	Montreal Canadiens	Montreal Forum	Recap
No scoring		First period	No scoring
No scoring		Second period	02:55 – pp – Jean Beliveau (4)
No scoring		Third period	08:07 – pp – Dick Duff (1)
Glenn Hall 29 saves / 31 shots		Goalie stats	Gump Worsley 18 saves / 18 shots

April 22	Montreal Canadiens	1–3	Chicago Black Hawks	Chicago Stadium	Recap
No scoring		First period	No scoring
John Ferguson (3) – 04:16		Second period	05:03 – Phil Esposito (3)
No scoring		Third period	02:08 – Kenny Wharram (2); 19:24 – en – Chico Maki (3)
Gump Worsley 25 saves / 27 shots		Goalie stats	Glenn Hall 22 saves / 23 shots

April 25	Montreal Canadiens	1–5	Chicago Black Hawks	Chicago Stadium	Recap
No scoring		First period	02:57 – Fred Stanfield (2)
Jean Beliveau (5) – pp – 06:29		Second period	No scoring
No scoring		Third period	00:26 – pp – Bobby Hull (9); 15:20 – pp – Bill Hay (3); 18:48 – Bobby Hull (10); 19:57 – Doug Jarrett (1)
Charlie Hodge 23 saves / 28 shots		Goalie stats	Glenn Hall 25 saves / 26 shots

April 27	Chicago Black Hawks	0–6	Montreal Canadiens	Montreal Forum	Recap
No scoring		First period	07:14 – pp – Jean Beliveau (6); 16:36 – pp – Dick Duff (2)
No scoring		Second period	02:38 – pp – Bobby Rousseau (5)
No scoring		Third period	04:29 – pp – Jean Beliveau (7); 06:46 – Henri Richard (6); 19:55 – sh – J.C. Tremblay (1)
Glenn Hall 21 saves / 24 shots Denis DeJordy 10 saves / 13 shots		Goalie stats	Charlie Hodge 23 saves / 23 shots

April 29	Montreal Canadiens	1–2	Chicago Black Hawks	Chicago Stadium	Recap
No scoring		First period	No scoring
Ralph Backstrom (2) – 16:57		Second period	No scoring
No scoring		Third period	06:06 – Moose Vasko (1); 08:15 – pp – Doug Mohns (3)
Charlie Hodge 22 saves / 24 shots		Goalie stats	Glenn Hall 21 saves / 22 shots

May 1	Chicago Black Hawks	0–4	Montreal Canadiens	Montreal Forum	Recap
No scoring		First period	00:14 – Jean Beliveau (8); 05:03 – Dick Duff (3); 16:27 – pp – Yvan Cournoyer (3); 18:45 – pp – Henri Richard (7)
No scoring		Second period	No scoring
No scoring		Third period	No scoring
Glenn Hall 31 saves / 35 shots		Goalie stats	Gump Worsley 20 saves / 20 shots

Montreal won series 4–3

== Awards ==
The NHL changed its criteria for the Vezina Trophy, allowing multiple goaltenders to be named the winner of the trophy. Johnny Bower and Terry Sawchuk of the Maple Leafs were named the winners. Neither made the all-star team. Pierre Pilote won the Norris Trophy for the third consecutive year. Stan Mikita won the Art Ross trophy (scoring champion) for the second consecutive year. Bobby Hull won the Hart Trophy as most valuable player for the first time, and the Lady Byng. Roger Crozier won the Calder for best first-year player, and was named the First All-Star team goaltender.

1964–65 NHL awards
Prince of Wales Trophy: (Regular season champion)	Detroit Red Wings
Art Ross Trophy: (Top scorer)	Stan Mikita, Chicago Black Hawks
Calder Memorial Trophy: (Best first-year player)	Roger Crozier, Detroit Red Wings
Conn Smythe Trophy: (Most valuable player, playoffs)	Jean Beliveau, Montreal Canadiens
Hart Trophy: (Most valuable player, season)	Bobby Hull, Chicago Black Hawks
James Norris Memorial Trophy: (Best defenceman)	Pierre Pilote, Chicago Black Hawks
Lady Byng Memorial Trophy: (Excellence and sportsmanship)	Bobby Hull, Chicago Black Hawks
Vezina Trophy: (Goaltender(s) of team with the best goals-against average)	Johnny Bower & Terry Sawchuk, Toronto Maple Leafs

=== All-Star teams ===
First team	Position	Second team
Roger Crozier, Detroit Red Wings	G	Charlie Hodge, Montreal Canadiens
Pierre Pilote, Chicago Black Hawks	D	Bill Gadsby, Detroit Red Wings
Jacques Laperriere, Montreal Canadiens	D	Carl Brewer, Toronto Maple Leafs
Norm Ullman, Detroit Red Wings	C	Stan Mikita, Chicago Black Hawks
Claude Provost, Montreal Canadiens	RW	Gordie Howe, Detroit Red Wings
Bobby Hull, Chicago Black Hawks	LW	Frank Mahovlich, Toronto Maple Leafs

== Player statistics ==
=== Scoring leaders ===
Note: GP = Games played, G = Goals, A = Assists, PTS = Points, PIM = Penalties in minutes

Player	Team	GP	G	A	PTS	PIM
Stan Mikita	Chicago Black Hawks	70	28	59	87	154
Norm Ullman	Detroit Red Wings	70	42	41	83	70
Gordie Howe	Detroit Red Wings	70	29	47	76	104
Bobby Hull	Chicago Black Hawks	61	39	32	71	32
Alex Delvecchio	Detroit Red Wings	68	25	42	67	16
Claude Provost	Montreal Canadiens	70	27	37	64	28
Rod Gilbert	New York Rangers	70	25	36	61	52
Pierre Pilote	Chicago Black Hawks	68	14	45	59	162
John Bucyk	Boston Bruins	68	26	29	55	24
Ralph Backstrom	Montreal Canadiens	70	25	30	55	44
Phil Esposito	Chicago Black Hawks	70	23	32	55	44

Source: NHL.

=== Leading goaltenders ===
Note: GP = Games played; Min – Minutes played; GA = Goals against; GAA = Goals against average; W = Wins; L = Losses; T = Ties; SO = Shutouts

Player	Team	GP	MIN	GA	GAA	W	L	T	SO
Johnny Bower	Toronto Maple Leafs	34	2040	81	2.38	13	13	8	3
Roger Crozier	Detroit Red Wings	70	4168	168	2.42	40	22	7	6
Glenn Hall	Chicago Black Hawks	41	2440	99	2.43	18	17	5	4
Denis DeJordy	Chicago Black Hawks	30	1760	74	2.52	16	11	3	3
Terry Sawchuk	Toronto Maple Leafs	36	2160	92	2.56	17	13	6	1
Charlie Hodge	Montreal Canadiens	53	3120	135	2.60	26	16	10	3
Jacques Plante	N.Y. Rangers	33	1938	109	3.37	10	17	5	2
Eddie Johnston	Boston Bruins	47	2820	163	3.47	11	32	4	3
Marcel Paille	N.Y. Rangers	39	2262	135	3.58	10	21	7	0
Jack Norris	Boston Bruins	23	1380	85	3.70	10	11	2	1

== Coaches ==
- Boston Bruins: Milt Schmidt
- Chicago Black Hawks: Billy Reay
- Detroit Red Wings: Sid Abel
- Montreal Canadiens: Toe Blake
- New York Rangers: Red Sullivan
- Toronto Maple Leafs: Punch Imlach

== Debuts ==
The following is a list of players of note who played their first NHL game in 1964–65 (listed with their first team, asterisk(*) marks debut in playoffs):

- Joe Watson, Boston Bruins
- Bill Goldsworthy, Boston Bruins
- Wayne Cashman, Boston Bruins
- Dennis Hull, Chicago Black Hawks
- Ken Hodge, Chicago Black Hawks
- Bob Plager, New York Rangers
- Brit Selby, Toronto Maple Leafs

== Last games ==
The following is a list of players of note that played their last game in the NHL in 1964–65 (listed with their last team):

- Tom Johnson, Boston Bruins
- Ted Lindsay, Detroit Red Wings

== Broadcasting ==
Hockey Night in Canada on CBC Television televised Saturday night regular season games and Stanley Cup playoff games. Games were not broadcast in their entirety until the 1968–69 season, and were typically joined in progress, while the radio version of HNIC aired games in their entirety.

This was the fifth and final consecutive season that the NHL did not have an American national broadcaster. NBC would later agree to air selected 1966 playoff games.

== See also ==
- 1964–65 NHL transactions
- List of Stanley Cup champions
- 1964 NHL amateur draft
- National Hockey League All-Star Game
- 1964 in sports
- 1965 in sports
