= 1964–65 NHL transactions =

The following is a list of all team-to-team transactions that have occurred in the National Hockey League (NHL) during the 1964–65 NHL season. It lists which team each player has been traded to and for which player(s) or other consideration(s), if applicable.

== Transactions ==
June 8, 1964	To Boston Bruins Reggie Fleming; Ab McDonald	To Chicago Black Hawks Doug Mohns
June 9, 1964	To Detroit Red Wings Autry Erickson; Ron Murphy	To Chicago Black Hawks Ian Cushenan; John Miszuk; Art Stratton
June 9, 1964	To Boston Bruins Murray Balfour; Mike Draper	To Chicago Black Hawks Matt Ravlich; Jerry Toppazzini
June 25, 1964	To Toronto Maple Leafs Ed Ehrenverth; Duane Rupp	To New York Rangers Lou Angotti; Ed Lawson
June 28, 1964	To Boston Bruins Guy Allen; Paul Reid	To Montreal Canadiens Alex Campbell rights to Ken Dryden
August, 1964 (exact date unknown)	To Detroit Red Wings cash	To Chicago Black Hawks Ed Chadwick
August, 1964 (exact date unknown)	To Toronto Maple Leafs Tom McCarthy	To Boston Bruins cash
August 1, 1964	To Boston Bruins cash	To Montreal Canadiens Orval Tessier
October 14, 1964	To Detroit Red Wings Ted Lindsay	To Chicago Black Hawks cash
December, 1964 (exact date unknown)	To Montreal Canadiens Chuck Holmes	To Detroit Red Wings Billy Carter
December 21, 1964	To Montreal Canadiens Dick Duff; Dave McComb	To New York Rangers Bill Hicke loan of Jean-Guy Morissette for remainder of 1964–65 season
February 6, 1963	To Chicago Black Hawks Wally Chevrier; Camille Henry; Don Johns; Billy Taylor	To New York Rangers John Brenneman; Wayne Hillman; Doug Robinson
