= 1964–65 Detroit Red Wings season =

Sports season

1964–65 Detroit Red Wings
- League: 1st NHL
- 1964–65 record: 40–23–7
- Home record: 25–7–3
- Road record: 15–16–4
- Goals for: 224
- Goals against: 175

Team information
- General manager: Sid Abel
- Coach: Sid Abel
- Captain: Alex Delvecchio
- Arena: Detroit Olympia

Team leaders
- Goals: Norm Ullman (42)
- Assists: Gordie Howe (47)
- Points: Norm Ullman (83)
- Penalty minutes: Ted Lindsay (173)
- Wins: Roger Crozier (40)
- Goals against average: Roger Crozier (2.42)

The 1964–65 Detroit Red Wings season saw the Red Wings finish in first place in the National Hockey League (NHL) with a record of 40 wins, 23 losses, and 7 draws. They lost in the first round of the playoffs to the Chicago Black Hawks in seven games.

Detroit goaltender Roger Crozier won the Calder Memorial Trophy as the league's Rookie of the Year. He was also named an NHL First Team All-Star, along with centreman Norm Ullman. Defenseman Bill Gadsby and right winger Gordie Howe were named NHL Second Team All-Stars this season.

== Regular season ==
=== Final standings ===
Pos	Team	Pld	W	L	T	GF	GA	GD	Pts
1	Detroit Red Wings	70	40	23	7	224	175	+49	87
2	Montreal Canadiens	70	36	23	11	211	185	+26	83
3	Chicago Black Hawks	70	34	28	8	224	176	+48	76
4	Toronto Maple Leafs	70	30	26	14	204	173	+31	74
5	New York Rangers	70	20	38	12	179	246	−67	52
6	Boston Bruins	70	21	43	6	166	253	−87	48

Source: National Hockey League

=== Record vs. opponents ===
1964–65 NHL Records
Team	BOS	CHI	DET	MTL	NYR	TOR
Boston	—	6–8	3–10–1	3–10–1	5–8–1	4–7–3
Chicago	8–6	—	8–5–1	5–6–3	9–3–2	4–8–2
Detroit	10–3–1	5–8–1	—	8–4–2	10–2–2	7–6–1
Montreal	10–3–1	6–5–3	4–8–2	—	10–2–2	6–5–3
New York	8–5–1	3–9–2	2–10–2	2–10–2	—	5–4–5
Toronto	7–4–3	8–4–2	6–7–1	5–6–3	4–5–5	—

== Schedule and results ==
1964–65 regular season
October

Game	Result	Date	Score	Opponent	Record
1	L	October 15, 1964	3–5	Toronto Maple Leafs (1964–65)	0–1–0
2	L	October 17, 1964	2–4	@ Chicago Black Hawks (1964–65)	0–2–0
3	W	October 18, 1964	3–2	Chicago Black Hawks (1964–65)	1–2–0
4	W	October 21, 1964	1–0	@ New York Rangers (1964–65)	2–2–0
5	T	October 24, 1964	1–1	@ Montreal Canadiens (1964–65)	2–2–1
6	W	October 25, 1964	4–0	@ Boston Bruins (1964–65)	3–2–1
7	W	October 29, 1964	2–0	Boston Bruins (1964–65)	4–2–1

November

Game	Result	Date	Score	Opponent	Record
8	W	November 1, 1964	4–2	Toronto Maple Leafs (1964–65)	5–2–1
9	W	November 5, 1964	3–1	New York Rangers (1964–65)	6–2–1
10	W	November 8, 1964	2–1	Montreal Canadiens (1964–65)	7–2–1
11	T	November 10, 1964	3–3	@ Boston Bruins (1964–65)	7–2–2
12	L	November 11, 1964	1–3	@ Toronto Maple Leafs (1964–65)	7–3–2
13	L	November 14, 1964	2–4	@ Montreal Canadiens (1964–65)	7–4–2
14	W	November 15, 1964	6–2	@ New York Rangers (1964–65)	8–4–2
15	L	November 17, 1964	1–2	New York Rangers (1964–65)	8–5–2
16	L	November 18, 1964	1–3	@ Chicago Black Hawks (1964–65)	8–6–2
17	W	November 21, 1964	3–1	@ Boston Bruins (1964–65)	9–6–2
18	T	November 22, 1964	3–3	@ New York Rangers (1964–65)	9–6–3
19	W	November 26, 1964	3–1	Montreal Canadiens (1964–65)	10–6–3
20	T	November 29, 1964	1–1	Toronto Maple Leafs (1964–65)	10–6–4

December

Game	Result	Date	Score	Opponent	Record
21	W	December 3, 1964	4–2	Boston Bruins (1964–65)	11–6–4
22	L	December 5, 1964	2–10	@ Toronto Maple Leafs (1964–65)	11–7–4
23	W	December 6, 1964	4–1	Montreal Canadiens (1964–65)	12–7–4
24	L	December 12, 1964	2–3	Chicago Black Hawks (1964–65)	12–8–4
25	L	December 13, 1964	0–5	@ Chicago Black Hawks (1964–65)	12–9–4
26	W	December 16, 1964	7–3	@ New York Rangers (1964–65)	13–9–4
27	L	December 17, 1964	3–5	Boston Bruins (1964–65)	13–10–4
28	W	December 20, 1964	3–1	Toronto Maple Leafs (1964–65)	14–10–4
29	T	December 25, 1964	2–2	Montreal Canadiens (1964–65)	14–10–5
30	L	December 26, 1964	3–6	@ Montreal Canadiens (1964–65)	14–11–5
31	W	December 27, 1964	3–1	New York Rangers (1964–65)	15–11–5
32	T	December 31, 1964	1–1	Chicago Black Hawks (1964–65)	15–11–6

January

Game	Result	Date	Score	Opponent	Record
33	L	January 2, 1965	1–3	@ Toronto Maple Leafs (1964–65)	15–12–6
34	W	January 3, 1965	8–1	Boston Bruins (1964–65)	16–12–6
35	W	January 6, 1965	5–4	@ Montreal Canadiens (1964–65)	17–12–6
36	L	January 7, 1965	2–5	@ Boston Bruins (1964–65)	17–13–6
37	L	January 9, 1965	4–7	Chicago Black Hawks (1964–65)	17–14–6
38	L	January 10, 1965	2–3	@ Chicago Black Hawks (1964–65)	17–15–6
39	W	January 16, 1965	4–2	@ Toronto Maple Leafs (1964–65)	18–15–6
40	L	January 17, 1965	2–4	New York Rangers (1964–65)	18–16–6
41	W	January 21, 1965	3–0	Boston Bruins (1964–65)	19–16–6
42	W	January 24, 1965	4–1	Toronto Maple Leafs (1964–65)	20–16–6
43	W	January 30, 1965	3–1	Chicago Black Hawks (1964–65)	21–16–6
44	W	January 31, 1965	4–1	@ New York Rangers (1964–65)	22–16–6

February

Game	Result	Date	Score	Opponent	Record
45	L	February 4, 1965	1–3	@ Boston Bruins (1964–65)	22–17–6
46	W	February 6, 1965	3–1	@ Montreal Canadiens (1964–65)	23–17–6
47	W	February 7, 1965	6–0	Montreal Canadiens (1964–65)	24–17–6
48	L	February 10, 1965	2–5	@ Chicago Black Hawks (1964–65)	24–18–6
49	W	February 11, 1965	5–3	Chicago Black Hawks (1964–65)	25–18–6
50	L	February 13, 1965	1–2	@ Toronto Maple Leafs (1964–65)	25–19–6
51	W	February 14, 1965	6–2	New York Rangers (1964–65)	26–19–6
52	L	February 17, 1965	0–2	@ Montreal Canadiens (1964–65)	26–20–6
53	W	February 20, 1965	3–2	New York Rangers (1964–65)	27–20–6
54	W	February 21, 1965	3–2	Toronto Maple Leafs (1964–65)	28–20–6
55	L	February 24, 1965	2–3	@ Chicago Black Hawks (1964–65)	28–21–6
56	W	February 27, 1965	4–1	Boston Bruins (1964–65)	29–21–6
57	W	February 28, 1965	5–1	Montreal Canadiens (1964–65)	30–21–6

March

Game	Result	Date	Score	Opponent	Record
58	W	March 3, 1965	2–0	@ Chicago Black Hawks (1964–65)	31–21–6
59	W	March 6, 1965	4–3	@ Boston Bruins (1964–65)	32–21–6
60	W	March 7, 1965	6–5	@ New York Rangers (1964–65)	33–21–6
61	W	March 9, 1965	3–2	Montreal Canadiens (1964–65)	34–21–6
62	W	March 10, 1965	4–2	@ Toronto Maple Leafs (1964–65)	35–21–6
63	L	March 13, 1965	2–4	@ Montreal Canadiens (1964–65)	35–22–6
64	W	March 14, 1965	5–2	@ Boston Bruins (1964–65)	36–22–6
65	W	March 18, 1965	10–3	Boston Bruins (1964–65)	37–22–6
66	T	March 19, 1965	6–6	@ New York Rangers (1964–65)	37–22–7
67	W	March 21, 1965	5–1	Chicago Black Hawks (1964–65)	38–22–7
68	W	March 25, 1965	7–4	New York Rangers (1964–65)	39–22–7
69	W	March 27, 1965	4–1	@ Toronto Maple Leafs (1964–65)	40–22–7
70	L	March 28, 1965	0–4	Toronto Maple Leafs (1964–65)	40–23–7

Legend: Win (2 points) Loss (0 points) Tie (1 point)

== Player statistics ==
=== Regular season ===
Scoring

Player	Pos	GP	G	A	Pts	PIM	PPG	SHG	GWG
Norm Ullman	C	70	42	41	83	70	9	1	10
Gordie Howe	RW	70	29	47	76	104	12	4	2
Alex Delvecchio	C/LW	68	25	42	67	16	6	0	7
Parker MacDonald	C	69	13	33	46	38	6	0	1
Floyd Smith	RW	67	16	29	45	44	6	1	5
Bruce MacGregor	C	66	21	20	41	19	3	1	4
Ron Murphy	LW	58	20	19	39	32	10	0	2
Ted Lindsay	LW	69	14	14	28	173	1	0	1
Doug Barkley	D	67	5	20	25	122	0	0	0
Eddie Joyal	C	46	8	14	22	4	0	0	1
Paul Henderson	RW	70	8	13	21	30	0	0	1
Pit Martin	C	58	8	9	17	32	1	1	1
Marcel Pronovost	D	68	1	15	16	45	0	0	1
Albert Langlois	D	65	1	12	13	107	0	1	0
Bill Gadsby	D	61	0	12	12	122	0	0	0
Gary Bergman	D	58	4	7	11	85	0	0	2
Val Fonteyne	LW	16	2	5	7	4	0	1	0
Larry Jeffrey	LW	41	4	2	6	48	0	0	2
Lowell MacDonald	LW	9	2	1	3	0	1	0	0
Pete Goegan	D	4	1	0	1	2	0	0	0
John MacMillan	RW	3	0	1	1	0	0	0	0
Andre Pronovost	LW	3	0	1	1	0	0	0	0
Roger Crozier	G	70	0	0	0	10	0	0	0
Bob Dillabough	C	4	0	0	0	2	0	0	0
Warren Godfrey	D	11	0	0	0	8	0	0	0
Ted Hampson	C	1	0	0	0	0	0	0	0
Claude Laforge	LW	1	0	0	0	2	0	0	0
Butch Paul	C	3	0	0	0	0	0	0	0
Jimmy Peters	C	1	0	0	0	0	0	0	0
Bob Wall	D	1	0	0	0	0	0	0	0
Jim Watson	D	1	0	0	0	2	0	0	0
Carl Wetzel	G	2	0	0	0	0	0	0	0

Goaltending

Player	MIN	GP	W	L	T	GA	GAA	SO
Roger Crozier	4168	70	40	22	7	168	2.42	6
Carl Wetzel	32	2	0	1	0	4	7.50	0
Team:	4200	70	40	23	7	172	2.46	6

=== Playoffs ===
Scoring

Player	Pos	GP	G	A	Pts	PIM	PPG	SHG	GWG
Norm Ullman	C	7	6	4	10	2			
Gordie Howe	RW	7	4	2	6	20			
Alex Delvecchio	C/LW	7	2	3	5	4			
Floyd Smith	RW	7	1	3	4	4			
Ted Lindsay	LW	7	3	0	3	34			
Bill Gadsby	D	7	0	3	3	8			
Marcel Pronovost	D	7	0	3	3	4			
Eddie Joyal	C	7	1	1	2	4			
Parker MacDonald	C	7	1	1	2	6			
Paul Henderson	RW	7	0	2	2	0			
Bruce MacGregor	C	7	0	2	2	2			
Albert Langlois	D	6	1	0	1	4			
Doug Barkley	D	5	0	1	1	14			
Gary Bergman	D	5	0	1	1	4			
Val Fonteyne	LW	5	0	1	1	0			
Warren Godfrey	D	4	0	1	1	2			
Pit Martin	C	3	0	1	1	2			
Ron Murphy	LW	5	0	1	1	4			
Roger Crozier	G	7	0	0	0	2			
Bob Dillabough	C	4	0	0	0	0			
Murray Hall	RW	1	0	0	0	0			
Larry Jeffrey	LW	2	0	0	0	0			
Irv Spencer	D	1	0	0	0	4			
Bob Wall	D	1	0	0	0	0			

Goaltending

Player	MIN	GP	W	L	GA	GAA	SO
Roger Crozier	420	7	3	4	23	3.29	0
Team:	420	7	3	4	23	3.29	0

Note: GP = Games played; G = Goals; A = Assists; Pts = Points; +/- = Plus-minus PIM = Penalty minutes; PPG = Power-play goals; SHG = Short-handed goals; GWG = Game-winning goals;
MIN = Minutes played; W = Wins; L = Losses; T = Ties; GA = Goals against; GAA = Goals-against average; SO = Shutouts;

== Awards and records ==
- Calder Memorial Trophy: Roger Crozier
- Roger Crozier, Goaltender, NHL First Team All-Star
- Norm Ullman, Center, NHL First Team All-Star
- Bill Gadsby, Defense, NHL Second Team All-Star
- Gordie Howe, Right Wing, NHL Second Team All-Star

== Draft picks ==
Detroit's draft picks at the 1964 NHL entry draft held at the Queen Elizabeth Hotel in Montreal.

Round	#	Player	Nationality	College/junior/club team (league)
1	1	Claude Gauthier	Canada	Rosemount Midgets (SAAAMHL)
2	7	Brian Watts	Canada	Toronto Marlboro Midgets (OAAAMHL)
3	13	Ralph Buchanan	Canada	Montreal East Midgets (QAAAMHL)
4	19	Rene LeClerc	Canada	Hamilton Mountain Bees (NDJBHL)

== See also ==
- 1964–65 NHL season
