= 1964–65 New York Rangers season =

NHL hockey team season

1964–65 New York Rangers
- League: 5th NHL
- 1964–65 record: 20–38–12
- Home record: 8–19–8
- Road record: 12–19–4
- Goals for: 179
- Goals against: 246

Team information
- General manager: Emile Francis
- Coach: Red Sullivan
- Captain: Camille Henry
- Arena: Madison Square Garden

Team leaders
- Goals: Rod Gilbert (25)
- Assists: Rod Gilbert (36)
- Points: Rod Gilbert (61)
- Penalty minutes: Arnie Brown (145)
- Wins: Marcel Paille/Jacques Plante (10)
- Goals against average: Jacques Plante (3.37)

The 1964–65 New York Rangers season was the franchise's 39th season. In the regular season, the Rangers posted a 20–38–12 record, and missed the NHL playoffs with a fifth-place finish for the third year in a row for the first time since the 1958–59 to 1960–61 seasons.

== Regular season ==
On January 27, 1965, Ulf Sterner, the first European trained player, made his debut in the National Hockey League for the New York Rangers in a game versus the Boston Bruins.

=== Final standings ===
Pos	Team	Pld	W	L	T	GF	GA	GD	Pts
1	Detroit Red Wings	70	40	23	7	224	175	+49	87
2	Montreal Canadiens	70	36	23	11	211	185	+26	83
3	Chicago Black Hawks	70	34	28	8	224	176	+48	76
4	Toronto Maple Leafs	70	30	26	14	204	173	+31	74
5	New York Rangers	70	20	38	12	179	246	−67	52
6	Boston Bruins	70	21	43	6	166	253	−87	48

Source: National Hockey League

=== Record vs. opponents ===
1964–65 NHL Records
Team	BOS	CHI	DET	MTL	NYR	TOR
Boston	—	6–8	3–10–1	3–10–1	5–8–1	4–7–3
Chicago	8–6	—	8–5–1	5–6–3	9–3–2	4–8–2
Detroit	10–3–1	5–8–1	—	8–4–2	10–2–2	7–6–1
Montreal	10–3–1	6–5–3	4–8–2	—	10–2–2	6–5–3
New York	8–5–1	3–9–2	2–10–2	2–10–2	—	5–4–5
Toronto	7–4–3	8–4–2	6–7–1	5–6–3	4–5–5	—

== Schedule and results ==
1964–65 regular season
October: 2–3–3 (home: 1–3–1; road: 1–0–2)

Game	October	Opponent	Score	Record
1	12	@ Boston Bruins	6–2	1–0–0
2	13	Montreal Canadiens	3–0	1–1–0
3	17	@ Montreal Canadiens	2–2	1–1–1
4	18	Toronto Maple Leafs	3–3	1–1–2
5	21	Detroit Red Wings	1–0	1–2–2
6	24	@ Toronto Maple Leafs	1–1	1–2–3
7	25	Chicago Black Hawks	5–2	1–3–3
8	28	Boston Bruins	3–1	2–3–3

November: 6–5–1 (home: 3–2–1; road: 3–3–0)

Game	November	Opponent	Score	Record
9	1	Montreal Canadiens	3–1	3–3–3
10	3	@ Chicago Black Hawks	2–1	3–4–3
11	5	@ Detroit Red Wings	3–1	3–5–3
12	7	@ Toronto Maple Leafs	1–0	4–5–3
13	11	Boston Bruins	4–2	5–5–3
14	15	Detroit Red Wings	6–2	5–6–3
15	17	@ Detroit Red Wings	2–1	6–6–3
16	22	Detroit Red Wings	3–3	6–6–4
17	25	Toronto Maple Leafs	6–3	7–6–4
18	26	@ Boston Bruins	6–1	7–7–4
19	28	@ Toronto Maple Leafs	4–1	8–7–4
20	29	Montreal Canadiens	5–2	8–8–4

December: 2–9–3 (home: 0–5–2; road: 2–4–1)

Game	December	Opponent	Score	Record
21	2	Chicago Black Hawks	3–3	8–8–5
22	5	@ Boston Bruins	3–3	8–8–6
23	6	@ Chicago Black Hawks	4–1	9–8–6
24	9	Chicago Black Hawks	6–1	9–9–6
25	12	@ Montreal Canadiens	7–1	9–10–6
26	13	Toronto Maple Leafs	3–3	9–10–7
27	16	Detroit Red Wings	7–3	9–11–7
28	19	@ Toronto Maple Leafs	6–3	9–12–7
29	20	Montreal Canadiens	3–2	9–13–7
30	23	@ Montreal Canadiens	2–0	9–14–7
31	25	@ Boston Bruins	3–0	10–14–7
32	26	Boston Bruins	2–0	10–15–7
33	27	@ Detroit Red Wings	3–1	10–16–7
34	29	Chicago Black Hawks	4–2	10–17–7

January: 5–6–2 (home: 2–2–1; road: 3–4–1)

Game	January	Opponent	Score	Record
35	1	@ Chicago Black Hawks	2–1	10–18–7
36	3	Toronto Maple Leafs	3–3	10–18–8
37	6	Boston Bruins	5–2	11–18–8
38	9	@ Montreal Canadiens	6–5	12–18–8
39	10	Toronto Maple Leafs	6–0	12–19–8
40	14	@ Boston Bruins	5–2	12–20–8
41	16	@ Chicago Black Hawks	6–3	13–20–8
42	17	@ Detroit Red Wings	4–2	14–20–8
43	23	@ Toronto Maple Leafs	1–1	14–20–9
44	24	@ Chicago Black Hawks	7–2	14–21–9
45	27	Boston Bruins	5–2	15–21–9
46	30	@ Montreal Canadiens	5–1	15–22–9
47	31	Detroit Red Wings	4–1	15–23–9

February: 3–7–1 (home: 2–2–1; road: 1–5–0)

Game	February	Opponent	Score	Record
48	3	Chicago Black Hawks	4–1	15–24–9
49	6	@ Boston Bruins	3–2	15–25–9
50	7	Boston Bruins	8–3	16–25–9
51	13	Chicago Black Hawks	3–0	16–26–9
52	14	@ Detroit Red Wings	6–2	16–27–9
53	17	@ Chicago Black Hawks	5–4	16–28–9
54	20	@ Detroit Red Wings	3–2	16–29–9
55	21	Montreal Canadiens	2–2	16–29–10
56	24	@ Montreal Canadiens	6–1	16–30–10
57	27	@ Toronto Maple Leafs	4–3	17–30–10
58	28	Toronto Maple Leafs	6–2	18–30–10

March: 2–8–2 (home: 0–5–2; road: 2–3–0)

Game	March	Opponent	Score	Record
59	3	Boston Bruins	6–1	18–31–10
60	4	@ Boston Bruins	4–3	19–31–10
61	6	@ Montreal Canadiens	2–1	19–32–10
62	7	Detroit Red Wings	6–5	19–33–10
63	10	Chicago Black Hawks	1–1	19–33–11
64	14	Montreal Canadiens	6–4	19–34–11
65	19	Detroit Red Wings	6–6	19–34–12
66	20	@ Toronto Maple Leafs	4–1	19–35–12
67	21	Toronto Maple Leafs	10–1	19–36–12
68	23	@ Chicago Black Hawks	3–2	20–36–12
69	25	@ Detroit Red Wings	7–4	20–37–12
70	28	Montreal Canadiens	5–3	20–38–12

Legend: Win (2 points) Loss (0 points) Tie (1 point)

== Player statistics ==
Skaters

Regular season
Player	GP	G	A	Pts	PIM
Rod Gilbert	70	25	36	61	52
Phil Goyette	52	12	34	46	6
Vic Hadfield	70	18	20	38	102
Camille Henry^{‡}	48	21	15	36	20
Donnie Marshall	69	20	15	35	2
Jean Ratelle	54	14	21	35	14
Bob Nevin	64	16	14	30	28
Earl Ingarfield	69	15	13	28	40
Rod Seiling	68	4	22	26	44
Doug Robinson^{†}	21	8	14	22	2
Harry Howell	68	2	20	22	63
Lou Angotti	70	9	8	17	20
Bill Hicke^{†}	40	6	11	17	26
Jim Neilson	62	0	13	13	58
Dick Duff^{‡}	29	3	9	12	20
Arnie Brown	58	1	11	12	145
Wayne Hillman^{†}	22	1	7	8	26
John Brenneman^{†}	22	3	3	6	6
Larry Cahan	26	0	5	5	32
Jim Mikol	30	1	3	4	6
Dave Richardson	7	0	1	1	4
Don Johns	22	0	1	1	4
Val Fonteyne^{‡}	27	0	1	1	2
Trevor Fahey	1	0	0	0	0
Mike McMahon	1	0	0	0	0
Dick Meissner	1	0	0	0	0
Jim Johnson	1	0	0	0	0
Gord Labossiere	1	0	0	0	0
Billy Taylor	2	0	0	0	0
Marc Dufour	2	0	0	0	0
Ron Ingram	3	0	0	0	2
Ted Taylor	4	0	0	0	4
Ulf Sterner	4	0	0	0	0
Alex Fitzpatrick	4	0	0	0	2
Mel Pearson	5	0	0	0	4
Bob Plager	10	0	0	0	18

Goaltenders

Regular season
Player	GP	TOI	W	L	T	GA	GAA	SA	SV%	SO
Marcel Paille	39	2262	10	21	7	135	3.58	1248	.892	0
Jacques Plante	33	1938	10	17	5	109	3.37	1116	.902	2

^{†}Denotes player spent time with another team before joining Rangers. Stats reflect time with Rangers only.
^{‡}Traded mid-season. Stats reflect time with Rangers only.

Note:

Pos = Position;GP = Games played; G = Goals; A = Assists; Pts = Points; PIM = Penalty minutes; +/- = Plus/minus; PPG = Power-play goals; SHG = Short-handed goals; GWG = Game-winning goals
Pos = Position;GP = Games played; Min, TOI = Minutes played; W = Wins; L = Losses; T,T/OT = Ties; OTL = Overtime losses; GA = Goals-against; GAA = Goals-against average; SO = Shutouts; SA = Shots against; SV = Shots saved;SV% = Save percentage;

== Draft picks ==
New York's picks at the 1964 NHL amateur draft in Montreal, Canada.

Round	#	Player	Position	Nationality	College/Junior/Club team (League)
1	3	Bob Graham	D	Canada	Toronto Marlboro Midgets
2	9	Tim Ecclestone	RW	Canada	Etobicoke (Junior B)
3	15	Gordon Lowe	D	Canada	Toronto Marlboro Midgets
4	21	Syl Apps, Jr	C	Canada	Kingston Midgets

== See also ==
- 1964–65 NHL season
