= 1964–65 Toronto Maple Leafs season =

NHL hockey team season

1964–65 Toronto Maple Leafs
- League: 4th NHL
- 1964–65 record: 30–26–14
- Home record: 17–15–3
- Road record: 13–11–11
- Goals for: 204
- Goals against: 173

Team information
- General manager: Punch Imlach
- Coach: Punch Imlach
- Captain: George Armstrong
- Arena: Maple Leaf Gardens

Team leaders
- Goals: Frank Mahovlich (23); Ron Ellis (23)
- Assists: Dave Keon (29)
- Points: Frank Mahovlich (51)
- Penalty minutes: Carl Brewer (177)
- Wins: Terry Sawchuk (17)
- Goals against average: Johnny Bower (2.38)

The 1964–65 Toronto Maple Leafs season was Toronto's 48th season in the National Hockey League (NHL). The team would make the playoffs for the seventh year in a row, before losing in the semifinals.

== Regular season ==
=== Final standings ===
Pos	Team	Pld	W	L	T	GF	GA	GD	Pts
1	Detroit Red Wings	70	40	23	7	224	175	+49	87
2	Montreal Canadiens	70	36	23	11	211	185	+26	83
3	Chicago Black Hawks	70	34	28	8	224	176	+48	76
4	Toronto Maple Leafs	70	30	26	14	204	173	+31	74
5	New York Rangers	70	20	38	12	179	246	−67	52
6	Boston Bruins	70	21	43	6	166	253	−87	48

Source: National Hockey League

=== Record vs. opponents ===
1964–65 NHL Records
Team	BOS	CHI	DET	MTL	NYR	TOR
Boston	—	6–8	3–10–1	3–10–1	5–8–1	4–7–3
Chicago	8–6	—	8–5–1	5–6–3	9–3–2	4–8–2
Detroit	10–3–1	5–8–1	—	8–4–2	10–2–2	7–6–1
Montreal	10–3–1	6–5–3	4–8–2	—	10–2–2	6–5–3
New York	8–5–1	3–9–2	2–10–2	2–10–2	—	5–4–5
Toronto	7–4–3	8–4–2	6–7–1	5–6–3	4–5–5	—

== Schedule and results ==
1964–65 regular season
October

Game	Result	Date	Score	Opponent	Record
1	W	October 15, 1964	5–3	@ Detroit Red Wings (1964–65)	1–0–0
2	W	October 17, 1964	7–2	Boston Bruins (1964–65)	2–0–0
3	T	October 18, 1964	3–3	@ New York Rangers (1964–65)	2–0–1
4	T	October 22, 1964	2–2	@ Boston Bruins (1964–65)	2–0–2
5	T	October 24, 1964	1–1	New York Rangers (1964–65)	2–0–3
6	W	October 27, 1964	3–2	@ Chicago Black Hawks (1964–65)	3–0–3
7	L	October 28, 1964	2–5	Montreal Canadiens (1964–65)	3–1–3
8	W	October 31, 1964	5–1	Chicago Black Hawks (1964–65)	4–1–3

November

Game	Result	Date	Score	Opponent	Record
9	L	November 1, 1964	2–4	@ Detroit Red Wings (1964–65)	4–2–3
10	T	November 5, 1964	2–2	@ Montreal Canadiens (1964–65)	4–2–4
11	L	November 7, 1964	0–1	New York Rangers (1964–65)	4–3–4
12	W	November 11, 1964	3–1	Detroit Red Wings (1964–65)	5–3–4
13	L	November 14, 1964	1–3	Boston Bruins (1964–65)	5–4–4
14	L	November 15, 1964	2–4	@ Chicago Black Hawks (1964–65)	5–5–4
15	W	November 18, 1964	3–1	Montreal Canadiens (1964–65)	6–5–4
16	W	November 21, 1964	1–0	Chicago Black Hawks (1964–65)	7–5–4
17	W	November 22, 1964	3–1	@ Boston Bruins (1964–65)	8–5–4
18	L	November 25, 1964	3–6	@ New York Rangers (1964–65)	8–6–4
19	W	November 26, 1964	4–2	@ Chicago Black Hawks (1964–65)	9–6–4
20	L	November 28, 1964	1–4	New York Rangers (1964–65)	9–7–4
21	T	November 29, 1964	1–1	@ Detroit Red Wings (1964–65)	9–7–5

December

Game	Result	Date	Score	Opponent	Record
22	L	December 3, 1964	2–4	@ Montreal Canadiens (1964–65)	9–8–5
23	W	December 5, 1964	10–2	Detroit Red Wings (1964–65)	10–8–5
24	L	December 9, 1964	2–3	Montreal Canadiens (1964–65)	10–9–5
25	W	December 12, 1964	6–3	Boston Bruins (1964–65)	11–9–5
26	T	December 13, 1964	3–3	@ New York Rangers (1964–65)	11–9–6
27	T	December 17, 1964	2–2	@ Montreal Canadiens (1964–65)	11–9–7
28	W	December 19, 1964	6–3	New York Rangers (1964–65)	12–9–7
29	L	December 20, 1964	1–3	@ Detroit Red Wings (1964–65)	12–10–7
30	T	December 25, 1964	3–3	@ Chicago Black Hawks (1964–65)	12–10–8
31	L	December 26, 1964	3–5	Chicago Black Hawks (1964–65)	12–11–8
32	L	December 30, 1964	3–4	Montreal Canadiens (1964–65)	12–12–8

January

Game	Result	Date	Score	Opponent	Record
33	L	January 1, 1965	0–3	@ Boston Bruins (1964–65)	12–13–8
34	W	January 2, 1965	3–1	Detroit Red Wings (1964–65)	13–13–8
35	T	January 3, 1965	3–3	@ New York Rangers (1964–65)	13–13–9
36	W	January 6, 1965	3–1	@ Chicago Black Hawks (1964–65)	14–13–9
37	W	January 9, 1965	2–1	Boston Bruins (1964–65)	15–13–9
38	W	January 10, 1965	6–0	@ New York Rangers (1964–65)	16–13–9
39	T	January 13, 1965	0–0	Chicago Black Hawks (1964–65)	16–13–10
40	W	January 14, 1965	5–3	@ Montreal Canadiens (1964–65)	17–13–10
41	L	January 16, 1965	2–4	Detroit Red Wings (1964–65)	17–14–10
42	W	January 17, 1965	3–1	@ Boston Bruins (1964–65)	18–14–10
43	L	January 20, 1965	1–2	Montreal Canadiens (1964–65)	18–15–10
44	T	January 23, 1965	1–1	New York Rangers (1964–65)	18–15–11
45	L	January 24, 1965	1–4	@ Detroit Red Wings (1964–65)	18–16–11
46	W	January 30, 1965	6–1	Boston Bruins (1964–65)	19–16–11
47	W	January 31, 1965	4–2	@ Boston Bruins (1964–65)	20–16–11

February

Game	Result	Date	Score	Opponent	Record
48	W	February 4, 1965	5–2	@ Montreal Canadiens (1964–65)	21–16–11
49	L	February 6, 1965	3–6	Chicago Black Hawks (1964–65)	21–17–11
50	W	February 7, 1965	2–1	@ Chicago Black Hawks (1964–65)	22–17–11
51	W	February 10, 1965	6–2	Montreal Canadiens (1964–65)	23–17–11
52	W	February 13, 1965	2–1	Detroit Red Wings (1964–65)	24–17–11
53	T	February 14, 1965	2–2	@ Boston Bruins (1964–65)	24–17–12
54	W	February 20, 1965	4–3	Chicago Black Hawks (1964–65)	25–17–12
55	L	February 21, 1965	2–3	@ Detroit Red Wings (1964–65)	25–18–12
56	L	February 24, 1965	1–3	Boston Bruins (1964–65)	25–19–12
57	L	February 27, 1965	3–4	New York Rangers (1964–65)	25–20–12
58	L	February 28, 1965	2–6	@ New York Rangers (1964–65)	25–21–12

March

Game	Result	Date	Score	Opponent	Record
59	T	March 4, 1965	2–2	@ Montreal Canadiens (1964–65)	25–21–13
60	W	March 6, 1965	4–1	Chicago Black Hawks (1964–65)	26–21–13
61	T	March 7, 1965	3–3	@ Boston Bruins (1964–65)	26–21–14
62	L	March 10, 1965	2–4	Detroit Red Wings (1964–65)	26–22–14
63	L	March 13, 1965	0–2	Boston Bruins (1964–65)	26–23–14
64	L	March 14, 1965	3–5	@ Chicago Black Hawks (1964–65)	26–24–14
65	L	March 18, 1965	1–4	@ Montreal Canadiens (1964–65)	26–25–14
66	W	March 20, 1965	4–1	New York Rangers (1964–65)	27–25–14
67	W	March 21, 1965	10–1	@ New York Rangers (1964–65)	28–25–14
68	W	March 24, 1965	3–2	Montreal Canadiens (1964–65)	29–25–14
69	L	March 27, 1965	1–4	Detroit Red Wings (1964–65)	29–26–14
70	W	March 28, 1965	4–0	@ Detroit Red Wings (1964–65)	30–26–14

Legend: Win (2 points) Loss (0 points) Tie (1 point)

== Player statistics ==
=== Regular season ===
Scoring

Player	GP	G	A	Pts	PIM
Frank Mahovlich	59	23	28	51	76
Dave Keon	65	21	29	50	10
Red Kelly	70	18	28	46	8
Andy Bathgate	55	16	29	45	34
Ron Ellis	62	23	16	39	14
Bob Pulford	65	19	20	39	46
George Armstrong	59	15	22	37	14
Tim Horton	70	12	16	28	95
Kent Douglas	67	5	23	28	129
Ron Stewart	65	16	11	27	33
Carl Brewer	70	4	23	27	177
Pete Stemkowski	36	5	15	20	33
Don McKenney	52	6	13	19	6
Jim Pappin	44	9	9	18	33
Bob Baun	70	0	18	18	160
Allan Stanley	64	2	15	17	30
Eddie Shack	67	5	9	14	68
Billy Harris	48	1	6	7	0
Dickie Moore	38	2	4	6	68
Brit Selby	3	2	0	2	2
Terry Sawchuk	36	0	2	2	24
Johnny Bower	34	0	0	0	6
Larry Hillman	2	0	0	0	2
Duane Rupp	2	0	0	0	0

Goaltending

Player	MIN	GP	W	L	T	GA	GAA	SA	SV	SV%	SO
Terry Sawchuk	2160	36	17	13	6	92	2.56				1
Johnny Bower	2040	34	13	13	8	81	2.38				3
Team:	4200	70	30	26	14	173	2.47				4

=== Playoffs ===
Scoring

Player	GP	G	A	Pts	PIM
Red Kelly	6	3	2	5	2
Dave Keon	6	2	2	4	2
Ron Ellis	6	3	0	3	2
Carl Brewer	6	1	2	3	12
Frank Mahovlich	6	0	3	3	9
Pete Stemkowski	6	0	3	3	7
Dickie Moore	5	1	1	2	6
Bob Pulford	6	1	1	2	16
Tim Horton	6	0	2	2	13
George Armstrong	6	1	0	1	4
Andy Bathgate	6	1	0	1	6
Eddie Shack	5	1	0	1	8
Bob Baun	6	0	1	1	14
Kent Douglas	5	0	1	1	19
Allan Stanley	6	0	1	1	12
Ron Stewart	6	0	1	1	2
Al Arbour	1	0	0	0	2
Johnny Bower	5	0	0	0	0
Don McKenney	6	0	0	0	0
Terry Sawchuk	1	0	0	0	0

Goaltending

Player	MIN	GP	W	L	T	GA	GAA	SA	SV	SV%	SO
Johnny Bower	321	5	2	3		13	2.43				0
Terry Sawchuk	60	1	0	1		3	3.00				0
Team:	381	6	2	4		16	2.52				0

== Transactions ==
The Maple Leafs were involved in the following transactions during the 1964–65 season.

=== Trades ===
June 25, 1964	To New York Rangers Lou Angotti; Ed Lawson	To Toronto Maple Leafs Duane Rupp; Ed Ehrenverth
August 1, 1964	To Boston Bruins Cash	To Toronto Maple Leafs Tom McCarthy

=== Inter-league draft ===
June 8, 1964	From Denver Invaders (WHL) Gord Redahl
June 8, 1964	From Montreal Canadiens Dickie Moore
June 8, 1964	From Detroit Red Wings Terry Sawchuk

=== Reverse draft ===
June 8, 1964	From Denver Invaders (WHL) Lou Jankowski

=== Free agents ===
Player	Former team
Terry Clancy	Undrafted Free Agent

== Draft picks ==
Toronto's draft picks at the 1964 NHL entry draft held at the Queen Elizabeth Hotel in Montreal.

Round	#	Player	Nationality	College/junior/club team (league)
1	5	Tom Martin	Canada	Toronto Marlboro Midgets (OAAAMHL)
2	11	David Cotey	Canada	Aurora Bears (SOJCHL)
3	17	Mike Pelyk	Canada	Toronto Marlboro Midgets (OAAAMHL)
4	23	Jim Dorey	Canada	Stamford Bruins (NDJBHL)

== See also ==
- 1964–65 NHL season
