= 1964–65 Boston Bruins season =

NHL team season

1964–65 Boston Bruins
- League: 6th NHL
- 1964–65 record: 21–43–6
- Home record: 12–17–6
- Road record: 9–26–0
- Goals for: 166
- Goals against: 253

Team information
- General manager: Lynn Patrick
- Coach: Milt Schmidt
- Captain: Leo Boivin
- Arena: Boston Garden

Team leaders
- Goals: Johnny Bucyk (26)
- Assists: Johnny Bucyk (29)
- Points: Johnny Bucyk (55)
- Penalty minutes: Ted Green (156)
- Wins: Eddie Johnston (11)
- Goals against average: Eddie Johnston (3.47)

The 1964–65 Boston Bruins season was the 41st season of operation for the Boston Bruins of the National Hockey League (NHL). The Bruins did not qualify for the playoffs for the sixth consecutive season for the first time in franchise history.

== Regular season ==
On January 27, 1965, Ulf Sterner, the first European trained player, made his debut in the National Hockey League for the New York Rangers in a game versus the Boston Bruins.

=== Final standings ===
| Pos | Team | Pld | W | L | T | GF | GA | GD | Pts |
|---|---|---|---|---|---|---|---|---|---|
| 1 | Detroit Red Wings | 70 | 40 | 23 | 7 | 224 | 175 | +49 | 87 |
| 2 | Montreal Canadiens | 70 | 36 | 23 | 11 | 211 | 185 | +26 | 83 |
| 3 | Chicago Black Hawks | 70 | 34 | 28 | 8 | 224 | 176 | +48 | 76 |
| 4 | Toronto Maple Leafs | 70 | 30 | 26 | 14 | 204 | 173 | +31 | 74 |
| 5 | New York Rangers | 70 | 20 | 38 | 12 | 179 | 246 | −67 | 52 |
| 6 | Boston Bruins | 70 | 21 | 43 | 6 | 166 | 253 | −87 | 48 |

Source: National Hockey League

=== Record vs. opponents ===
1964–65 NHL Records
| Team | BOS | CHI | DET | MTL | NYR | TOR |
|---|---|---|---|---|---|---|
| Boston | — | 6–8 | 3–10–1 | 3–10–1 | 5–8–1 | 4–7–3 |
| Chicago | 8–6 | — | 8–5–1 | 5–6–3 | 9–3–2 | 4–8–2 |
| Detroit | 10–3–1 | 5–8–1 | — | 8–4–2 | 10–2–2 | 7–6–1 |
| Montreal | 10–3–1 | 6–5–3 | 4–8–2 | — | 10–2–2 | 6–5–3 |
| New York | 8–5–1 | 3–9–2 | 2–10–2 | 2–10–2 | — | 5–4–5 |
| Toronto | 7–4–3 | 8–4–2 | 6–7–1 | 5–6–3 | 4–5–5 | — |

== Schedule and results ==
1964–65 regular season
October

| Game | Result | Date | Score | Opponent | Record |
|---|---|---|---|---|---|
| 3 | L | October 17, 1964 | 2–7 | @ Toronto Maple Leafs (1964–65) | 0–3–0 |
| 4 | L | October 18, 1964 | 1–3 | Montreal Canadiens (1964–65) | 0–4–0 |
| 5 | T | October 22, 1964 | 2–2 | Toronto Maple Leafs (1964–65) | 0–4–1 |
| 6 | L | October 25, 1964 | 0–4 | Detroit Red Wings (1964–65) | 0–5–1 |
| 7 | L | October 28, 1964 | 1–3 | @ New York Rangers (1964–65) | 0–6–1 |
| 8 | L | October 29, 1964 | 0–2 | @ Detroit Red Wings (1964–65) | 0–7–1 |
| 9 | L | October 31, 1964 | 2–6 | @ Montreal Canadiens (1964–65) | 0–8–1 |

November

| Game | Result | Date | Score | Opponent | Record |
|---|---|---|---|---|---|
| 10 | W | November 1, 1964 | 5–2 | Chicago Black Hawks (1964–65) | 1–8–1 |
| 11 | W | November 8, 1964 | 3–2 | Chicago Black Hawks (1964–65) | 2–8–1 |
| 12 | T | November 10, 1964 | 3–3 | Detroit Red Wings (1964–65) | 2–8–2 |
| 13 | L | November 11, 1964 | 2–4 | @ New York Rangers (1964–65) | 2–9–2 |
| 14 | W | November 14, 1964 | 3–1 | @ Toronto Maple Leafs (1964–65) | 3–9–2 |
| 15 | T | November 15, 1964 | 2–2 | Montreal Canadiens (1964–65) | 3–9–3 |
| 16 | L | November 21, 1964 | 1–3 | Detroit Red Wings (1964–65) | 3–10–3 |
| 17 | L | November 22, 1964 | 1–3 | Toronto Maple Leafs (1964–65) | 3–11–3 |
| 18 | W | November 26, 1964 | 6–1 | New York Rangers (1964–65) | 4–11–3 |
| 19 | L | November 28, 1964 | 1–2 | @ Montreal Canadiens (1964–65) | 4–12–3 |
| 20 | W | November 29, 1964 | 4–3 | @ Chicago Black Hawks (1964–65) | 5–12–3 |

December

| Game | Result | Date | Score | Opponent | Record |
|---|---|---|---|---|---|
| 21 | L | December 3, 1964 | 2–4 | @ Detroit Red Wings (1964–65) | 5–13–3 |
| 22 | T | December 5, 1964 | 3–3 | New York Rangers (1964–65) | 5–13–4 |
| 23 | L | December 10, 1964 | 1–5 | Chicago Black Hawks (1964–65) | 5–14–4 |
| 24 | L | December 12, 1964 | 3–6 | @ Toronto Maple Leafs (1964–65) | 5–15–4 |
| 25 | L | December 13, 1964 | 4–5 | Montreal Canadiens (1964–65) | 5–16–4 |
| 26 | L | December 16, 1964 | 5–7 | @ Chicago Black Hawks (1964–65) | 5–17–4 |
| 27 | W | December 17, 1964 | 5–3 | @ Detroit Red Wings (1964–65) | 6–17–4 |
| 28 | L | December 20, 1964 | 2–3 | Chicago Black Hawks (1964–65) | 6–18–4 |
| 29 | L | December 25, 1964 | 0–3 | New York Rangers (1964–65) | 6–19–4 |
| 30 | W | December 26, 1964 | 2–0 | @ New York Rangers (1964–65) | 7–19–4 |
| 31 | L | December 27, 1964 | 2–6 | @ Chicago Black Hawks (1964–65) | 7–20–4 |

January

| Game | Result | Date | Score | Opponent | Record |
|---|---|---|---|---|---|
| 32 | W | January 1, 1965 | 3–0 | Toronto Maple Leafs (1964–65) | 8–20–4 |
| 33 | L | January 2, 1965 | 1–3 | @ Montreal Canadiens (1964–65) | 8–21–4 |
| 34 | L | January 3, 1965 | 1–8 | @ Detroit Red Wings (1964–65) | 8–22–4 |
| 35 | L | January 6, 1965 | 2–5 | @ New York Rangers (1964–65) | 8–23–4 |
| 36 | W | January 7, 1965 | 5–2 | Detroit Red Wings (1964–65) | 9–23–4 |
| 37 | L | January 9, 1965 | 1–2 | @ Toronto Maple Leafs (1964–65) | 9–24–4 |
| 38 | W | January 14, 1965 | 5–2 | New York Rangers (1964–65) | 10–24–4 |
| 39 | L | January 16, 1965 | 2–3 | @ Montreal Canadiens (1964–65) | 10–25–4 |
| 40 | L | January 17, 1965 | 1–3 | Toronto Maple Leafs (1964–65) | 10–26–4 |
| 41 | L | January 20, 1965 | 1–7 | @ Chicago Black Hawks (1964–65) | 10–27–4 |
| 42 | L | January 21, 1965 | 0–3 | @ Detroit Red Wings (1964–65) | 10–28–4 |
| 43 | L | January 23, 1965 | 1–5 | @ Montreal Canadiens (1964–65) | 10–29–4 |
| 44 | W | January 24, 1965 | 3–0 | Montreal Canadiens (1964–65) | 11–29–4 |
| 45 | L | January 27, 1965 | 2–5 | @ New York Rangers (1964–65) | 11–30–4 |
| 46 | L | January 28, 1965 | 2–6 | Chicago Black Hawks (1964–65) | 11–31–4 |
| 47 | L | January 30, 1965 | 1–6 | @ Toronto Maple Leafs (1964–65) | 11–32–4 |
| 48 | L | January 31, 1965 | 2–4 | Toronto Maple Leafs (1964–65) | 11–33–4 |

February

| Game | Result | Date | Score | Opponent | Record |
|---|---|---|---|---|---|
| 49 | W | February 4, 1965 | 3–1 | Detroit Red Wings (1964–65) | 12–33–4 |
| 50 | W | February 6, 1965 | 3–2 | New York Rangers (1964–65) | 13–33–4 |
| 51 | L | February 7, 1965 | 3–8 | @ New York Rangers (1964–65) | 13–34–4 |
| 52 | L | February 11, 1965 | 1–7 | Montreal Canadiens (1964–65) | 13–35–4 |
| 53 | W | February 13, 1965 | 5–4 | Montreal Canadiens (1964–65) | 14–35–4 |
| 54 | T | February 14, 1965 | 2–2 | Toronto Maple Leafs (1964–65) | 14–35–5 |
| 55 | L | February 20, 1965 | 2–6 | @ Montreal Canadiens (1964–65) | 14–36–5 |
| 56 | L | February 21, 1965 | 0–7 | @ Chicago Black Hawks (1964–65) | 14–37–5 |
| 57 | W | February 24, 1965 | 3–1 | @ Toronto Maple Leafs (1964–65) | 15–37–5 |
| 58 | L | February 27, 1965 | 1–4 | @ Detroit Red Wings (1964–65) | 15–38–5 |
| 59 | W | February 28, 1965 | 5–4 | @ Chicago Black Hawks (1964–65) | 16–38–5 |

March

| Game | Result | Date | Score | Opponent | Record |
|---|---|---|---|---|---|
| 60 | W | March 3, 1965 | 6–1 | @ New York Rangers (1964–65) | 17–38–5 |
| 61 | L | March 4, 1965 | 3–4 | New York Rangers (1964–65) | 17–39–5 |
| 62 | L | March 6, 1965 | 3–4 | Detroit Red Wings (1964–65) | 17–40–5 |
| 63 | T | March 7, 1965 | 3–3 | Toronto Maple Leafs (1964–65) | 17–40–6 |
| 64 | W | March 13, 1965 | 2–0 | @ Toronto Maple Leafs (1964–65) | 18–40–6 |
| 65 | L | March 14, 1965 | 2–5 | Detroit Red Wings (1964–65) | 18–41–6 |
| 66 | W | March 17, 1965 | 2–1 | Chicago Black Hawks (1964–65) | 19–41–6 |
| 67 | L | March 18, 1965 | 3–10 | @ Detroit Red Wings (1964–65) | 19–42–6 |
| 68 | L | March 21, 1965 | 2–5 | Montreal Canadiens (1964–65) | 19–43–6 |
| 69 | W | March 27, 1965 | 6–2 | @ Montreal Canadiens (1964–65) | 20–43–6 |
| 70 | W | March 28, 1965 | 3–1 | Chicago Black Hawks (1964–65) | 21–43–6 |

Legend: Win (2 points) Loss (0 points) Tie (1 point)

== Player statistics ==
=== Regular season ===
Scoring

| Player | Pos | GP | G | A | Pts | PIM | PPG | SHG | GWG |
|---|---|---|---|---|---|---|---|---|---|
| John Bucyk | LW | 68 | 26 | 29 | 55 | 24 | 7 | 0 | 2 |
| Murray Oliver | C | 65 | 20 | 23 | 43 | 30 | 6 | 0 | 4 |
| Reggie Fleming | D/LW | 67 | 18 | 23 | 41 | 136 | 1 | 2 | 4 |
| Ted Green | D | 70 | 8 | 27 | 35 | 156 | 2 | 0 | 0 |
| Tommy Williams | RW | 65 | 13 | 21 | 34 | 28 | 2 | 0 | 3 |
| Ed Westfall | D/RW | 68 | 12 | 15 | 27 | 65 | 0 | 2 | 2 |
| Orland Kurtenbach | C | 64 | 6 | 20 | 26 | 86 | 0 | 1 | 0 |
| Dean Prentice | LW | 31 | 14 | 9 | 23 | 12 | 3 | 1 | 2 |
| Wayne Rivers | RW | 58 | 6 | 17 | 23 | 72 | 0 | 0 | 0 |
| Ab McDonald | LW | 60 | 9 | 9 | 18 | 6 | 2 | 0 | 3 |
| Bill Knibbs | C | 53 | 7 | 10 | 17 | 4 | 0 | 0 | 0 |
| Wayne Maxner | LW | 54 | 7 | 6 | 13 | 42 | 1 | 0 | 0 |
| Leo Boivin | D | 67 | 3 | 10 | 13 | 68 | 0 | 0 | 1 |
| Bob Woytowich | D | 21 | 2 | 10 | 12 | 16 | 0 | 0 | 0 |
| Ron Schock | C | 33 | 4 | 7 | 11 | 14 | 1 | 0 | 0 |
| Forbes Kennedy | C | 52 | 6 | 4 | 10 | 41 | 0 | 4 | 0 |
| Tom Johnson | D | 51 | 0 | 9 | 9 | 30 | 0 | 0 | 0 |
| Bob McCord | D | 43 | 0 | 6 | 6 | 26 | 0 | 0 | 0 |
| Don Awrey | D | 47 | 2 | 3 | 5 | 41 | 0 | 0 | 0 |
| Bobby Leiter | C | 18 | 3 | 1 | 4 | 6 | 0 | 0 | 0 |
| Murray Balfour | RW | 15 | 0 | 2 | 2 | 26 | 0 | 0 | 0 |
| Gary Dornhoefer | RW | 20 | 0 | 1 | 1 | 13 | 0 | 0 | 0 |
| Jeannot Gilbert | C | 4 | 0 | 1 | 1 | 0 | 0 | 0 | 0 |
| Joe Watson | D | 4 | 0 | 1 | 1 | 0 | 0 | 0 | 0 |
| Wayne Cashman | LW | 1 | 0 | 0 | 0 | 0 | 0 | 0 | 0 |
| Bill Goldsworthy | RW | 2 | 0 | 0 | 0 | 0 | 0 | 0 | 0 |
| Eddie Johnston | G | 47 | 0 | 0 | 0 | 4 | 0 | 0 | 0 |
| Jack Norris | G | 23 | 0 | 0 | 0 | 0 | 0 | 0 | 0 |

Goaltending

| Player | MIN | GP | W | L | T | GA | GAA | SO |
|---|---|---|---|---|---|---|---|---|
| Eddie Johnston | 2820 | 47 | 11 | 32 | 4 | 163 | 3.47 | 3 |
| Jack Norris | 1380 | 23 | 10 | 11 | 2 | 85 | 3.70 | 1 |
| Team: | 4200 | 70 | 21 | 43 | 6 | 248 | 3.54 | 4 |

Note:

Pos = Position;GP = Games played; G = Goals; A = Assists; Pts = Points; PIM = Penalty minutes; +/- = Plus/minus; PPG = Power-play goals; SHG = Short-handed goals; GWG = Game-winning goals
Pos = Position;GP = Games played; Min, TOI = Minutes played; W = Wins; L = Losses; T,T/OT = Ties; OTL = Overtime losses; GA = Goals-against; GAA = Goals-against average; SO = Shutouts; SA = Shots against; SV = Shots saved;SV% = Save percentage;

== Draft picks ==
Boston's draft picks at the 1964 NHL entry draft held at the Queen Elizabeth Hotel in Montreal.

| Round | # | Player | Nationality | College/junior/club team (league) |
|---|---|---|---|---|
| 1 | 2 | Alex Campbell | Canada | Strathroy Midgets (OAAAMHL) |
| 2 | 8 | Jim Booth | Canada | Sault Ste. Marie Midgets (OAAAMHL) |
| 3 | 14 | Ken Dryden | Canada | Etobicoke Capitols (MetJHL) |
| 4 | 20 | Allister Blair | Canada | Ingersoll Marlands (WBJHL) |

== See also ==
- 1964–65 NHL season
