= 1964–65 Montreal Canadiens season =

NHL hockey team season (won the Stanley Cup)

1964–65 Montreal Canadiens
- Stanley Cup champions
- League: 2nd NHL
- 1964–65 record: 36–23–11
- Home record: 20–8–7
- Road record: 16–15–4
- Goals for: 211
- Goals against: 185

Team information
- General manager: Sam Pollock
- Coach: Toe Blake
- Captain: Jean Beliveau
- Alternate captains: Henri Richard; Jean-Guy Talbot
- Arena: Montreal Forum

Team leaders
- Goals: Claude Provost (27)
- Assists: Claude Provost (37)
- Points: Claude Provost (64)
- Penalty minutes: John Ferguson (156)
- Wins: Charlie Hodge (26)
- Goals against average: Charlie Hodge (2.60)

The 1964–65 Montreal Canadiens season was the 56th season of play of the club. The Canadiens won the Stanley Cup for the first time in five seasons, and the 13th time in franchise history, by defeating the Chicago Black Hawks in the final.

== Regular season ==
=== Final standings ===
Pos	Team	Pld	W	L	T	GF	GA	GD	Pts
1	Detroit Red Wings	70	40	23	7	224	175	+49	87
2	Montreal Canadiens	70	36	23	11	211	185	+26	83
3	Chicago Black Hawks	70	34	28	8	224	176	+48	76
4	Toronto Maple Leafs	70	30	26	14	204	173	+31	74
5	New York Rangers	70	20	38	12	179	246	−67	52
6	Boston Bruins	70	21	43	6	166	253	−87	48

Source: National Hockey League

=== Record vs. opponents ===
1964–65 NHL Records
Team	BOS	CHI	DET	MTL	NYR	TOR
Boston	—	6–8	3–10–1	3–10–1	5–8–1	4–7–3
Chicago	8–6	—	8–5–1	5–6–3	9–3–2	4–8–2
Detroit	10–3–1	5–8–1	—	8–4–2	10–2–2	7–6–1
Montreal	10–3–1	6–5–3	4–8–2	—	10–2–2	6–5–3
New York	8–5–1	3–9–2	2–10–2	2–10–2	—	5–4–5
Toronto	7–4–3	8–4–2	6–7–1	5–6–3	4–5–5	—

== Schedule and results ==
1964–65 regular season
October

Game	Result	Date	Score	Opponent	Record
1	W	October 13, 1964	3–0	@ New York Rangers (1964–65)	1–0–0
2	T	October 17, 1964	2–2	New York Rangers (1964–65)	1–0–1
3	W	October 18, 1964	3–1	@ Boston Bruins (1964–65)	2–0–1
4	T	October 21, 1964	5–5	Chicago Black Hawks (1964–65)	2–0–2
5	T	October 24, 1964	1–1	Detroit Red Wings (1964–65)	2–0–3
6	W	October 28, 1964	5–2	@ Toronto Maple Leafs (1964–65)	3–0–3
7	W	October 31, 1964	6–2	Boston Bruins (1964–65)	4–0–3

November

Game	Result	Date	Score	Opponent	Record
8	L	November 1, 1964	1–3	@ New York Rangers (1964–65)	4–1–3
9	T	November 5, 1964	2–2	Toronto Maple Leafs (1964–65)	4–1–4
10	L	November 7, 1964	1–3	Chicago Black Hawks (1964–65)	4–2–4
11	L	November 8, 1964	1–2	@ Detroit Red Wings (1964–65)	4–3–4
12	W	November 11, 1964	4–1	@ Chicago Black Hawks (1964–65)	5–3–4
13	W	November 14, 1964	4–2	Detroit Red Wings (1964–65)	6–3–4
14	T	November 15, 1964	2–2	@ Boston Bruins (1964–65)	6–3–5
15	L	November 18, 1964	1–3	@ Toronto Maple Leafs (1964–65)	6–4–5
16	L	November 22, 1964	2–6	@ Chicago Black Hawks (1964–65)	6–5–5
17	L	November 26, 1964	1–3	@ Detroit Red Wings (1964–65)	6–6–5
18	W	November 28, 1964	2–1	Boston Bruins (1964–65)	7–6–5
19	W	November 29, 1964	5–2	@ New York Rangers (1964–65)	8–6–5

December

Game	Result	Date	Score	Opponent	Record
20	W	December 3, 1964	4–2	Toronto Maple Leafs (1964–65)	9–6–5
21	W	December 5, 1964	5–3	Chicago Black Hawks (1964–65)	10–6–5
22	L	December 6, 1964	1–4	@ Detroit Red Wings (1964–65)	10–7–5
23	W	December 9, 1964	3–2	@ Toronto Maple Leafs (1964–65)	11–7–5
24	W	December 12, 1964	7–1	New York Rangers (1964–65)	12–7–5
25	W	December 13, 1964	5–4	@ Boston Bruins (1964–65)	13–7–5
26	T	December 17, 1964	2–2	Toronto Maple Leafs (1964–65)	13–7–6
27	L	December 19, 1964	3–6	Chicago Black Hawks (1964–65)	13–8–6
28	W	December 20, 1964	3–2	@ New York Rangers (1964–65)	14–8–6
29	W	December 23, 1964	2–0	New York Rangers (1964–65)	15–8–6
30	T	December 25, 1964	2–2	@ Detroit Red Wings (1964–65)	15–8–7
31	W	December 26, 1964	6–3	Detroit Red Wings (1964–65)	16–8–7
32	W	December 30, 1964	4–3	@ Toronto Maple Leafs (1964–65)	17–8–7

January

Game	Result	Date	Score	Opponent	Record
33	W	January 2, 1965	3–1	Boston Bruins (1964–65)	18–8–7
34	W	January 3, 1965	2–1	@ Chicago Black Hawks (1964–65)	19–8–7
35	L	January 6, 1965	4–5	Detroit Red Wings (1964–65)	19–9–7
36	L	January 9, 1965	5–6	New York Rangers (1964–65)	19–10–7
37	L	January 14, 1965	3–5	Toronto Maple Leafs (1964–65)	19–11–7
38	W	January 16, 1965	3–2	Boston Bruins (1964–65)	20–11–7
39	W	January 17, 1965	4–2	@ Chicago Black Hawks (1964–65)	21–11–7
40	W	January 20, 1965	2–1	@ Toronto Maple Leafs (1964–65)	22–11–7
41	W	January 23, 1965	5–1	Boston Bruins (1964–65)	23–11–7
42	L	January 24, 1965	0–3	@ Boston Bruins (1964–65)	23–12–7
43	W	January 27, 1965	2–0	Chicago Black Hawks (1964–65)	24–12–7
44	W	January 30, 1965	5–1	New York Rangers (1964–65)	25–12–7
45	L	January 31, 1965	0–3	@ Chicago Black Hawks (1964–65)	25–13–7

February

Game	Result	Date	Score	Opponent	Record
46	L	February 4, 1965	2–5	Toronto Maple Leafs (1964–65)	25–14–7
47	L	February 6, 1965	1–3	Detroit Red Wings (1964–65)	25–15–7
48	L	February 7, 1965	0–6	@ Detroit Red Wings (1964–65)	25–16–7
49	L	February 10, 1965	2–6	@ Toronto Maple Leafs (1964–65)	25–17–7
50	W	February 11, 1965	7–1	@ Boston Bruins (1964–65)	26–17–7
51	L	February 13, 1965	4–5	@ Boston Bruins (1964–65)	26–18–7
52	T	February 14, 1965	2–2	@ Chicago Black Hawks (1964–65)	26–18–8
53	W	February 17, 1965	2–0	Detroit Red Wings (1964–65)	27–18–8
54	W	February 20, 1965	6–2	Boston Bruins (1964–65)	28–18–8
55	T	February 21, 1965	2–2	@ New York Rangers (1964–65)	28–18–9
56	W	February 24, 1965	6–1	New York Rangers (1964–65)	29–18–9
57	T	February 27, 1965	3–3	Chicago Black Hawks (1964–65)	29–18–10
58	L	February 28, 1965	1–5	@ Detroit Red Wings (1964–65)	29–19–10

March

Game	Result	Date	Score	Opponent	Record
59	T	March 4, 1965	2–2	Toronto Maple Leafs (1964–65)	29–19–11
60	W	March 6, 1965	2–1	New York Rangers (1964–65)	30–19–11
61	L	March 7, 1965	0–7	@ Chicago Black Hawks (1964–65)	30–20–11
62	L	March 9, 1965	2–3	@ Detroit Red Wings (1964–65)	30–21–11
63	W	March 13, 1965	4–2	Detroit Red Wings (1964–65)	31–21–11
64	W	March 14, 1965	6–4	@ New York Rangers (1964–65)	32–21–11
65	W	March 18, 1965	4–1	Toronto Maple Leafs (1964–65)	33–21–11
66	W	March 20, 1965	3–2	Chicago Black Hawks (1964–65)	34–21–11
67	W	March 21, 1965	5–2	@ Boston Bruins (1964–65)	35–21–11
68	L	March 24, 1965	2–3	@ Toronto Maple Leafs (1964–65)	35–22–11
69	L	March 27, 1965	2–6	Boston Bruins (1964–65)	35–23–11
70	W	March 28, 1965	5–3	@ New York Rangers (1964–65)	36–23–11

Legend: Win (2 points) Loss (0 points) Tie (1 point)

== Playoffs ==
=== Stanley Cup finals ===
Like the 1955 finals, every game was won by the home team. Gump Worsley made his first finals appearance after 12 years in the league and recorded two shutouts, including the one in game seven. Jean Beliveau was the inaugural winner of the Conn Smythe Trophy as playoff MVP, scoring eight goals and eight assists in thirteen games.

Chicago Black Hawks vs. Montreal Canadiens

Date	Visitors	Score	Home	Score	Notes
April 17	Chicago	2	Montreal	3	
April 20	Chicago	0	Montreal	2	
April 22	Montreal	1	Chicago	3	
April 25	Montreal	1	Chicago	5	
April 27	Chicago	0	Montreal	6	
April 29	Montreal	1	Chicago	2	
May 1	Chicago	0	Montreal	4	

Montreal wins Stanley Cup four games to three. Jean Beliveau wins first Conn Smythe Trophy.

== Player statistics ==
=== Regular season ===
==== Scoring ====
Player	Pos	GP	G	A	Pts	PIM	PPG	SHG	GWG
Claude Provost	RW	70	27	37	64	28	11	1	5
Ralph Backstrom	C	70	25	30	55	41	7	0	2
Henri Richard	C	53	23	29	52	43	5	0	5
Bobby Rousseau	RW	66	12	35	47	26	5	1	2
John Ferguson	LW	69	17	27	44	156	6	0	2
Jean Beliveau	C	58	20	23	43	76	9	0	1
Dave Balon	LW	63	18	23	41	61	1	0	5
Claude Larose	RW	68	21	16	37	82	4	0	4
Jacques Laperriere	D	67	5	22	27	92	0	0	0
Jean-Guy Talbot	D	67	8	14	22	64	0	1	3
J. C. Tremblay	D	68	3	17	20	22	1	0	1
Yvan Cournoyer	RW	55	7	10	17	10	4	0	0
Dick Duff	LW	40	9	7	16	16	0	0	3
Gilles Tremblay	LW	26	9	7	16	16	4	1	1
Ted Harris	D	68	1	14	15	107	0	0	0
Jim Roberts	D/RW	70	3	10	13	40	0	1	0
Terry Harper	D	62	0	7	7	93	0	0	0
Noel Picard	D	16	0	7	7	33	0	0	0
Red Berenson	C	3	1	2	3	0	0	0	1
Keith McCreary	RW	9	0	3	3	4	0	0	0
Leon Rochefort	RW	9	2	0	2	0	0	0	1
Garry Peters	C	13	0	2	2	6	0	0	0
Bill Hicke	RW	17	0	1	1	6	0	0	0
Bryan Watson	D	5	0	1	1	7	0	0	0
Andre Boudrias	LW	1	0	0	0	2	0	0	0
Charlie Hodge	G	53	0	0	0	2	0	0	0
Gump Worsley	G	19	0	0	0	0	0	0	0

==== Goaltending ====
Player	MIN	GP	W	L	T	GA	GAA	SO
Charlie Hodge	3180	53	26	16	10	135	2.55	3
Gump Worsley	1020	19	10	7	1	50	2.94	1
Team:	4200	70	36	23	11	185	2.64	4

=== Playoffs ===
==== Scoring ====
Player	Pos	GP	G	A	Pts	PIM	PPG	SHG	GWG
Jean Beliveau	C	13	8	8	16	34			
Bobby Rousseau	RW	13	5	8	13	24			
Henri Richard	C	13	7	4	11	24			
J. C. Tremblay	D	13	1	9	10	18			
Dick Duff	LW	13	3	6	9	17			
Claude Provost	RW	13	2	6	8	12			
Ralph Backstrom	C	13	2	3	5	10			
Ted Harris	D	13	0	5	5	45			
Yvan Cournoyer	RW	12	3	1	4	0			
John Ferguson	LW	13	3	1	4	28			
Jacques Laperriere	D	6	1	1	2	16			
Red Berenson	C	9	0	1	1	2			
Claude Larose	RW	13	0	1	1	14			
Noel Picard	D	3	0	1	1	0			
Jean-Guy Talbot	D	13	0	1	1	22			
Dave Balon	LW	10	0	0	0	10			
Jean Gauthier	D	2	0	0	0	4			
Terry Harper	D	13	0	0	0	19			
Charlie Hodge	G	5	0	0	0	0			
Jim Roberts	D/RW	13	0	0	0	30			
Gump Worsley	G	8	0	0	0	0			

==== Goaltending ====
Player	MIN	GP	W	L	GA	GAA	SO
Gump Worsley	501	8	5	3	14	1.68	2
Charlie Hodge	300	5	3	2	10	2.00	1
Team:	801	13	8	5	24	1.80	3

Note:

Pos = Position;GP = Games played; G = Goals; A = Assists; Pts = Points; PIM = Penalty minutes; +/- = Plus/minus; PPG = Power-play goals; SHG = Short-handed goals; GWG = Game-winning goals
Pos = Position;GP = Games played; Min, TOI = Minutes played; W = Wins; L = Losses; T,T/OT = Ties; OTL = Overtime losses; GA = Goals-against; GAA = Goals-against average; SO = Shutouts; SA = Shots against; SV = Shots saved;SV% = Save percentage;

== Awards and records ==
- Jean Beliveau, inaugural winner, Conn Smythe Trophy.

== Draft picks ==
Round	Overall	Player
1	6	Claude Chagnon
2	12	Guy Allen
3	18	Paul Reid
4	24	Michel Jacques

== See also ==
- 1964–65 NHL season
- List of Stanley Cup champions
