= Doug Jarrett =

Canadian ice hockey player (1944–2014)

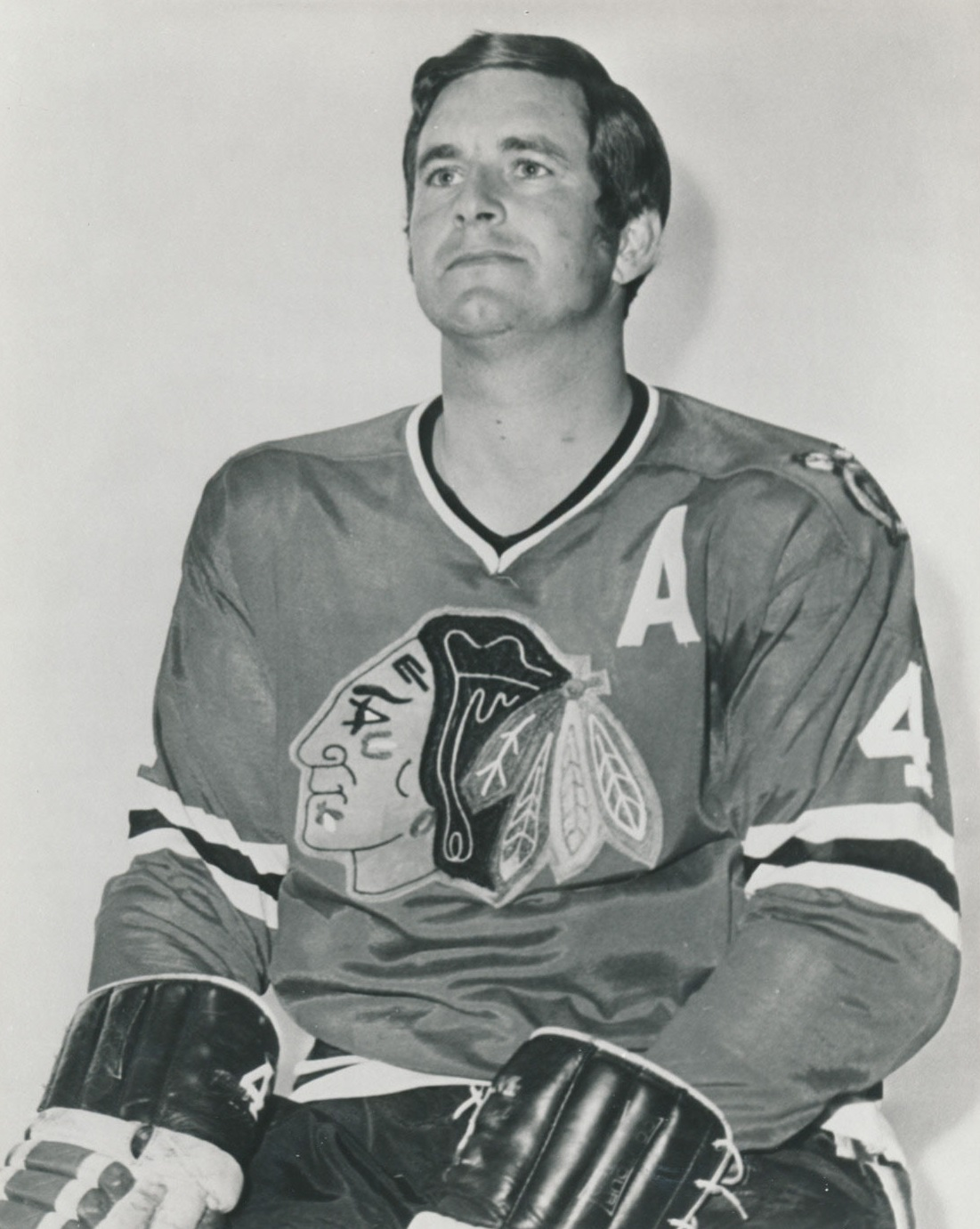
- Jarrett in 1973
- Born: April 22, 1944 London, Ontario, Canada
- Died: February 10, 2014 (aged 69) Fort Erie, Ontario, Canada
- Height: 6 ft 1 in (185 cm)
- Weight: 190 lb (86 kg; 13 st 8 lb)
- Position: Defence
- Shot: Left
- Played for: Chicago Black Hawks; New York Rangers
- Playing career: 1960–1977

Douglas William Jarrett (April 22, 1944 – February 10, 2014) was a Canadian ice hockey defenceman, who played in the National Hockey League (NHL), most notably with the Chicago Black Hawks.

A noted defensive defenceman, his best season was 1967, when he finished second in the NHL in plus-minus (behind defense partner Pierre Pilote), and was seventh in voting for the James Norris Memorial Trophy as best defenceman in the league. He was also named to play in the 1975 NHL All-Star Game, in his final season with Chicago.

After that season, Jarrett was traded to the New York Rangers for goaltender Gilles Villemure. In an injury-plagued season, chronic back problems caused Jarrett's play to fall off sharply, and in the subsequent season, he was sent down after nine games to the New Haven Nighthawks of the American Hockey League, finishing his career in the minors.

After his playing career, Jarrett periodically worked on behalf of the Chicago Blackhawk Alumni Association. Born in London, Ontario, Jarrett was inducted into the London Sports Hall of Fame in 2011. He died of cancer in 2014 at the age of 69.

== Career statistics ==
			Regular season					Playoffs
Season	Team	League	GP	G	A	Pts	PIM	GP	G	A	Pts	PIM
1960–61	St. Catharines Teepees	OHA-Jr.	36	2	2	4	78	6	0	0	0	16
1961–62	St. Catharines Teepees	OHA-Jr.	49	4	6	10	103	6	0	1	1	10
1962–63	St. Catharines Black Hawks	OHA-Jr.	50	9	18	27	88	—	—	—	—	—
1962–63	Buffalo Bisons	AHL	1	0	0	0	4	—	—	—	—	—
1963–64	St. Catharines Black Hawks	OHA-Jr.	54	10	51	61	144	13	5	12	17	22
1963–64	Buffalo Bisons	AHL	1	0	0	0	0	—	—	—	—	—
1964–65	Chicago Black Hawks	NHL	46	2	15	17	34	11	1	0	1	10
1964–65	St. Louis Braves	CPHL	17	3	7	10	23	—	—	—	—	—
1964–65	Buffalo Bisons	AHL	1	0	0	0	0	—	—	—	—	—
1965–66	Chicago Black Hawks	NHL	66	4	12	16	71	5	0	1	1	9
1966–67	Chicago Black Hawks	NHL	70	5	21	26	76	6	0	3	3	8
1967–68	Chicago Black Hawks	NHL	74	4	19	23	48	11	4	0	4	9
1968–69	Chicago Black Hawks	NHL	69	0	13	13	58	—	—	—	—	—
1969–70	Chicago Black Hawks	NHL	72	4	20	24	78	8	1	0	1	4
1970–71	Chicago Black Hawks	NHL	51	1	12	13	46	18	1	6	7	14
1971–72	Chicago Black Hawks	NHL	78	6	23	29	68	8	0	2	2	16
1972–73	Chicago Black Hawks	NHL	49	2	11	13	18	15	0	3	3	2
1973–74	Chicago Black Hawks	NHL	67	5	11	16	45	10	0	1	1	6
1974–75	Chicago Black Hawks	NHL	79	5	21	26	66	7	0	0	0	4
1975–76	New York Rangers	NHL	45	0	4	4	19	—	—	—	—	—
1976–77	New York Rangers	NHL	9	0	0	0	4	—	—	—	—	—
1976–77	New Haven Nighthawks	AHL	40	2	7	9	10	—	—	—	—	—
NHL totals			775	38	182	220	631	99	7	16	23	82
