= Jean-Guy Morissette =

Canadian ice hockey player

- Born: December 16, 1937; Causapscal, Quebec, Canada
- Died: March 22, 2011 (aged 73); Victoriaville, Quebec, Canada
- Height: 5 ft 8 in (173 cm)
- Weight: 140 lb (64 kg; 10 st 0 lb)
- Position: Goaltender
- Caught: Left
- Played for: Montreal Canadiens
- Playing career: 1961–1972

Jean-Guy Donat Morissette (December 16, 1937 – March 22, 2011) was a Canadian ice hockey goaltender. He played one game in the National Hockey League with the Montreal Canadiens during the 1963–64 season, on October 30, 1963, against the Toronto Maple Leafs. The rest of his career, which lasted from 1955 to 1972, was spent in the minor leagues. He had a wife, Claude, as well as two children.

== Career statistics ==
=== Regular season and playoffs ===
			Regular season									Playoffs
Season	Team	League	GP	W	L	T	MIN	GA	SO	GAA	SV%	GP	W	L	MIN	GA	SO	GAA	SV%
1955–56	Jonquiere Aces	QJHL	—	—	—	—	—	—	—	—	—	—	—	—	—	—	—	—	—
1955–56	Chicoutimi Sagueneens	QSHL	1	—	—	—	60	3	0	3.00	—	—	—	—	—	—	—	—	—
1956–57	Jonquiere Aces	QPHL	—	—	—	—	—	—	—	—	—	—	—	—	—	—	—	—	—
1957–58	Jonquiere Aces	QPHL	—	—	—	—	—	—	—	—	—	—	—	—	—	—	—	—	—
1958–59	Jonquiere Aces	QPHL	—	—	—	—	—	—	—	—	—	—	—	—	—	—	—	—	—
1959–60	Jonquiere Aces	QPHL	—	—	—	—	—	—	—	—	—	—	—	—	—	—	—	—	—
1960–61	Jonquiere Aces	QPHL	—	—	—	—	—	—	—	—	—	—	—	—	—	—	—	—	—
1961–62	Causapscal Pioneers	LSLHL	—	—	—	—	—	—	—	—	—	—	—	—	—	—	—	—	—
1961–62	Amherst Ramblers	NSSHL	7	5	2	0	420	20	1	2.86	—	9	8	1	540	26	2	2.89	—
1961–62	Amherst Ramblers	Al-Cup	—	—	—	—	—	—	—	—	—	8	5	3	491	29	0	3.54	—
1962–63	Amherst-Moncton Hawks	NSSHL	55	—	—	—	3300	228	1	4.15	—	11	8	3	660	31	0	2.82	—
1962–63	Moncton Hawks	Al-Cup	—	—	—	—	—	—	—	—	—	15	10	5	910	51	0	3.36	—
1963–64	Montreal Canadiens	NHL	1	0	1	0	37	4	0	6.60	.765	—	—	—	—	—	—	—	—
1963–64	Omaha Knights	CHL	7	4	1	2	420	22	0	3.14	—	—	—	—	—	—	—	—	—
1963–64	Quebec Aces	AHL	1	1	0	0	60	2	0	2.00	—	—	—	—	—	—	—	—	—
1963–64	Cleveland Barons	AHL	5	2	2	1	310	14	1	2.71	—	9	9	0	540	17	0	1.89	—
1964–65	Cleveland Barons	AHL	11	4	6	1	670	38	0	3.40	—	—	—	—	—	—	—	—	—
1964–65	Baltimore Clippers	AHL	20	9	10	0	1173	70	1	3.58	—	—	—	—	—	—	—	—	—
1964–65	Omaha Knights	CHL	12	4	6	2	720	39	3	3.25	—	—	—	—	—	—	—	—	—
1964–65	Victoria Maple Leafs	WHL	—	—	—	—	—	—	—	—	—	2	1	1	125	6	0	2.88	—
1965–66	Cleveland Barons	AHL	8	4	2	0	398	24	0	3.62	—	1	0	0	24	1	0	2.50	—
1966–67	California Seals	WHL	8	5	2	0	440	21	1	2.86	—	—	—	—	—	—	—	—	—
1966–67	Quebec Aces	AHL	9	3	2	1	409	19	0	2.79	—	—	—	—	—	—	—	—	—
1967–68	Vancouver Canucks	WHL	11	1	8	1	638	58	0	5.45	—	—	—	—	—	—	—	—	—
1969–70	Victoriaville Tigres	QSHL	—	—	—	—	—	—	—	—	—	—	—	—	—	—	—	—	—
1970–71	Grand Falls Cataracts	NFLD Sr	35	14	16	5	2100	144	1	4.11	—	19	13	6	1140	47	2	2.47	—
1970–71	Grand Falls Cataracts	Al-Cup	—	—	—	—	—	—	—	—	—	5	2	3	380	19	0	3.00	—
1971–72	Grand Falls Cataracts	NFLD Sr	33	25	5	3	1980	77	5	2.33	—	11	11	0	660	22	2	2.00	—
1971–72	Grand Falls Cataracts	Al-Cup	—	—	—	—	—	—	—	—	—	3	0	3	164	15	0	5.49	—
NHL totals			1	0	1	0	37	4	0	6.60	.765	—	—	—	—	—	—	—	—

== See also ==
- List of players who played only one game in the NHL
