= 1958 Stanley Cup Final =

1958 ice hockey championship series

	1	2	3	4	5	6	Total
Montreal Canadiens	2	2	3	1	3*	5	4
Boston Bruins	1	5	0	3	2*	3	2
- * – Denotes overtime period(s)
- Location(s): Montreal: Montreal Forum (1, 2, 5); Boston: Boston Garden (3, 4, 6)
- Coaches: Montreal: Toe Blake; Boston: Milt Schmidt
- Captains: Montreal: Maurice Richard; Boston: Fernie Flaman
- Dates: April 8–20, 1958
- Series-winning goal: Bernie Geoffrion (19:26, second)
- Hall of Famers: Canadiens: Jean Beliveau (1972); Bernie Geoffrion (1972); Doug Harvey (1973); Tom Johnson (1970); Dickie Moore (1974); Bert Olmstead (1985); Jacques Plante (1978); Henri Richard (1979); Maurice Richard (1961); Bruins: Leo Boivin (1986); Johnny Bucyk (1981); Fernie Flaman (1990); Harry Lumley (1980; did not play); Allan Stanley (1981); Coaches: Toe Blake (1966, player); Milt Schmidt (1961, player); Officials: George Hayes (1988); Matt Pavelich (1987); Red Storey (1967); Frank Udvari (1973)

The 1958 Stanley Cup Final was the championship series of the National Hockey League's (NHL) 1957–58 season, and the culmination of the 1958 Stanley Cup playoffs. It was contested between the two-time defending champion Montreal Canadiens and the Boston Bruins in a rematch of the 1957 Finals. The Canadiens, who were appearing in the Finals for the eighth consecutive year, defeated the Bruins in six games for their third straight Cup victory and tenth in the team's history. The Canadiens became the second team in NHL history to three-peat as Stanley Cup champions, joining their archrival Toronto Maple Leafs.

== Paths to the Finals ==
Montreal defeated the Detroit Red Wings 4–0, and Boston defeated the New York Rangers 4–2, to reach the Finals.

== Game summaries ==
Montreal captain Maurice Richard led the playoff goal-scoring race with 11. In Game 5, he notched his sixth career playoff overtime goal (three of which occurred in this and previous Stanley Cup Finals).

=== Game one ===
April 8	Boston Bruins	1–2	Montreal Canadiens	Montreal Forum	Recap

Bernie Geoffrion scored a power-play goal in the first period to open the scoring in game one, but Allan Stanley scored on a power-play to tie the game. Dickie Moore would score the game winning goal on a power-play with 6:04 remaining in the second, and Jacques Plante would perform well, making 28 saves, and the Canadiens won the game by a score of 2–1 to take a 1–0 series lead.

Scoring summary
Period	Team	Goal	Assist(s)	Time	Score
1st	MTL	Bernie Geoffrion (2) – pp	Donnie Marshall (2) and Doug Harvey (5)	12:24	1–0 MTL
2nd	BOS	Allan Stanley (1) – pp	Don McKenney (8) and Fleming MacKell (11)	05:54	1–1
2nd	MTL	Dickie Moore (2) – pp	Jean Beliveau (5) and Maurice Richard (4)	13:52	2–1 MTL
3rd	None				
Penalty summary
Period	Team	Player	Penalty	Time	PIM
1st	BOS	Leo Labine	High-sticking	00:55	2:00
1st	BOS	Fernie Flaman	Hooking	03:03	2:00
1st	MTL	Jean Beliveau	Hooking	04:00	2:00
1st	BOS	Fernie Flaman	Roughing	05:17	2:00
1st	MTL	Claude Provost	Roughing	05:17	2:00
1st	BOS	Allan Stanley	Tripping	07:08	2:00
1st	MTL	Maurice Richard	Slashing	07:31	2:00
1st	BOS	Leo Boivin	Fighting – major	08:00	5:00
1st	MTL	Henri Richard	Fighting – major	08:00	5:00
1st	BOS	Bench (served by Larry Regan)	Too many men on the ice	11:44	2:00
1st	MTL	Jean Beliveau	Charging	13:18	2:00
1st	BOS	Leo Labine	Roughing	16:47	2:00
1st	MTL	Andre Pronovost	Roughing	16:47	2:00
2nd	MTL	Jean Beliveau	Tripping	04:25	2:00
2nd	MTL	Doug Harvey	Interference	06:25	2:00
2nd	BOS	Doug Mohns	Interference	06:45	2:00
2nd	MTL	Dollard St. Laurent	Tripping	09:46	2:00
2nd	BOS	Leo Labine	Tripping	12:45	2:00
2nd	MTL	Doug Harvey	Interference	19:33	2:00
3rd	MTL	Henri Richard	Holding	16:47	2:00
3rd	MTL	Fleming MacKell	Hooking	17:25	2:00

Shots by period
Team	1	2	3	Total
Boston	12	8	9	29
Montreal	16	12	16	44

=== Game two ===
April 10	Boston Bruins	5–2	Montreal Canadiens	Montreal Forum	Recap

Norm Johnson scored early in the first, Bronco Horvath scored twice, and Larry Regan recorded three points as the Bruins defeated the Canadiens 5–2 in game two to tie the series.

Scoring summary
Period	Team	Goal	Assist(s)	Time	Score
1st	BOS	Norm Johnson (3)	Larry Regan (5) and Leo Labine (1)	00:20	1–0 BOS
1st	MTL	Bernie Geoffrion (3) – pp	Doug Harvey (5) and Dickie Moore (1)	03:12	1–1
1st	BOS	Don McKenney (6) – pp	Fleming MacKell (12) and Larry Regan (6)	06:58	2–1 BOS
1st	BOS	Bronco Horvath (3) – pp	Buddy Boone (1)	17:23	3–1 BOS
2nd	BOS	Larry Regan (2)	Allan Stanley (2)	05:00	4–1 BOS
2nd	MTL	Doug Harvey (1)	Dickie Moore (4)	07:00	4–2 BOS
3rd	BOS	Bronco Horvath (4)	Vic Stasiuk (3) and Doug Mohns (9)	16:52	5–2 BOS
Penalty summary
Period	Team	Player	Penalty	Time	PIM
1st	BOS	Allan Stanley	Hooking	01:55	2:00
1st	MTL	Bob Turner	Slashing	05:31	2:00
1st	MTL	Doug Harvey	Hooking	06:10	2:00
1st	BOS	Leo Labine	Hooking	08:38	2:00
1st	BOS	Fleming MacKell	Spearing	09:48	2:00
1st	MTL	Doug Harvey	Hooking	12:52	2:00
1st	BOS	Don McKenney	Hooking	15:23	2:00
1st	MTL	Maurice Richard	Slashing	15:23	2:00
1st	MTL	Dollard St. Laurent	Cross-checking	16:28	2:00
2nd	MTL	Marcel Bonin	Misconduct	05:31	10:00
2nd	MTL	Maurice Richard	Slashing	11:35	2:00
2nd	BOS	Leo Boivin	Interference	15:31	2:00
3rd	BOS	Leo Boivin	Kneeing	04:54	2:00
3rd	BOS	Bronco Horvath	Roughing	08:49	2:00
3rd	MTL	Jean-Guy Talbot	Cross-checking	08:49	2:00
3rd	MTL	Andre Pronovost	Kneeing	19:27	2:00
3rd	BOS	Larry Hillman	Charging	19:40	2:00

Shots by period
Team	1	2	3	Total
Boston	10	11	11	32
Montreal	10	15	8	33

=== Game three ===
April 13	Montreal Canadiens	3–0	Boston Bruins	Boston Garden	Recap

Maurice Richard scored twice for Montreal in game two, while his brother Henri recorded two points. Jacques Plante made 18 saves to record his first shutout of the postseason, and the Canadiens defeated the Bruins 3–0.

Scoring summary
Period	Team	Goal	Assist(s)	Time	Score
1st	MTL	Maurice Richard (8)	Bernie Geoffrion (3) and Doug Harvey (7)	18:20	1–0 MTL
2nd	None				
3rd	MTL	Henri Richard (1)	Doug Harvey (8)	03:00	2–0 MTL
3rd	MTL	Maurice Richard (9)	Henri Richard (6) and Dickie Moore (5)	15:06	3–0 MTL
Penalty summary
Period	Team	Player	Penalty	Time	PIM
1st	MTL	Andre Pronovost	High-sticking	03:27	2:00
1st	BOS	Buddy Boone	Tripping	06:27	2:00
1st	BOS	Jerry Toppazzini	Slashing	07:29	2:00
1st	BOS	Norm Johnson	Cross-checking	12:25	2:00
1st	BOS	Bronco Horvath	Tripping	16:17	2:00
2nd	MTL	Ab McDonald	Hooking	01:44	2:00
2nd	MTL	Jean-Guy Talbot	Holding	19:03	2:00
3rd	None				

Shots by period
Team	1	2	3	Total
Montreal	10	11	9	30
Boston	8	4	6	18

=== Game four ===
April 15	Montreal Canadiens	3–1	Boston Bruins	Boston Garden	Recap

Don McKenney scored twice in game four, and Don Simmons and the Boston defense stood tall. Boston went on to win the game 3–1, tying the series again.

Scoring summary
Period	Team	Goal	Assist(s)	Time	Score
1st	BOS	Don McKenney (7) – pp	Fleming MacKell (13) and Larry Regan (7)	05:35	1–0 BOS
2nd	BOS	Don McKenney (8)	Bronco Horvath (3) and Vic Stasiuk (4)	03:30	2–0 BOS
3rd	BOS	Jerry Toppazzini (9)	Fleming MacKell (14)	02:30	3–0 BOS
3rd	MTL	Claude Provost (1)	Jean Beliveau (6) and Marcel Bonin (1)	12:57	3–1 BOS
Penalty summary
Period	Team	Player	Penalty	Time	PIM
1st	MTL	Dollard St. Laurent	Holding	03:41	2:00
1st	BOS	Buddy Boone	Interference	07:20	2:00
1st	BOS	Doug Mohns	High-sticking	17:13	2:00
1st	MTL	Henri Richard	High-sticking	17:13	2:00
2nd	MTL	Dollard St. Laurent	Holding	01:26	2:00
2nd	MTL	Andre Pronovost	Elbowing	12:42	2:00
3rd	MTL	Jean-Guy Talbot	Holding	09:02	2:00
3rd	BOS	Johnny Bucyk	Tripping	17:27	2:00

Shots by period
Team	1	2	3	Total
Montreal	10	6	8	24
Boston	11	10	9	30

=== Game five ===
April 17	Boston Bruins	2–3	OT	Montreal Canadiens	Montreal Forum	Recap

Maurice Richard scored the game winning goal in overtime to give the Canadiens a 3–2 victory, as well as a 3–2 lead in the series.

Scoring summary
Period	Team	Goal	Assist(s)	Time	Score
1st	BOS	Fleming MacKell (5) – pp	Allan Stanley (3) and Jerry Toppazzini (3)	18:43	1–0 BOS
2nd	MTL	Bernie Geoffrion (4)	Jean Beliveau (7)	02:20	1–1
2nd	MTL	Jean Beliveau (3)	Bernie Geoffrion (4)	02:20	2–1 MTL
3rd	BOS	Bronco Horvath (5)	Vic Stasiuk (5) and Leo Boivin (3)	10:35	2–2
OT	MTL	Maurice Richard (10)	Dickie Moore (5) and Henri Richard (7)	05:45	3–2 MTL
Penalty summary
Period	Team	Player	Penalty	Time	PIM
1st	BOS	Johnny Bucyk	Tripping	03:27	2:00
1st	BOS	Doug Mohns	Roughing	04:54	2:00
1st	MTL	Dickie Moore	Roughing	04:54	2:00
1st	MTL	Maurice Richard	High-sticking	13:33	2:00
1st	MTL	Jean Beliveau	High-sticking	17:03	2:00
2nd	MTL	Andre Pronovost	Kneeing	04:37	2:00
2nd	BOS	Doug Mohns	Holding	05:30	2:00
3rd	None				
OT	None				

Shots by period
Team	1	2	3	OT	Total
Boston	14	10	11	5	40
Montreal	18	13	12	4	47

=== Game five ===
April 20	Montreal Canadiens	5–3	Boston Bruins	Boston Garden	Recap

Scoring summary
Period	Team	Goal	Assist(s)	Time	Score
1st	MTL	Bernie Geoffrion (5)	Jean Beliveau (3) and Bert Olmstead (3)	00:46	1–0 MTL
1st	MTL	Maurice Richard (11)	Dickie Moore (7)	01:54	2–0 MTL
1st	BOS	Don McKenney (9)	Doug Mohns (10)	18:35	2–1 MTL
2nd	MTL	Jean Beliveau (4)	Bernie Geoffrion (5) and Doug Harvey (9)	06:42	3–1 MTL
2nd	MTL	Bernie Geoffrion (6)	Unassisted	19:26	4–1 MTL
3rd	BOS	Norm Johnson (4)	Larry Regan (8)	05:20	4–2 MTL
3rd	BOS	Larry Regan (3)	Fernie Flaman (2) and Leo Labine (2)	13:41	4–3 MTL
3rd	MTL	Doug Harvey (2) – en	Unassisted	19:00	5–3 MTL
Penalty summary
Period	Team	Player	Penalty	Time	PIM
1st	MTL	Phil Goyette	Tripping	01:59	2:00
1st	BOS	Johnny Bucyk	High-sticking	07:38	2:00
2nd	BOS	Norm Johnson	Slashing	00:35	2:00
3rd	None				

Shots by period
Team	1	2	3	Total
Montreal	14	20	12	46
Boston	14	7	13	34

== Stanley Cup engraving ==
The 1958 Stanley Cup was presented to Canadiens captain Maurice Richard by NHL President Clarence Campbell following the Canadiens 5–3 win over the Bruins in game six.

The following Canadiens players and staff had their names engraved on the Stanley Cup

1957–58 Montreal Canadiens

=== Players ===
Centres

- 4 Jean Beliveau
- 8 Connie Broden
- 16 Henri Richard
- 20 Phil Goyette

Wingers

- 5 Bernie Geoffrion
- 6 Floyd Curry (A)
- 9 Maurice "Rocket" Richard (Captain)
- 12 Dickie Moore
- 14 Claude Provost
- 15 Bert Olmstead
- 18 Marcel Bonin
- 22 Don Marshall
- 23 Andre Pronovost
- 24 Alvin Ab McDonald

Defencemen

- 2 Doug Harvey (A)
- 10 Tom Johnson (A)
- 11 Bob Turner
- 17 Jean-Guy Talbot
- 19 Dollard St. Laurent
- 21 Al Langlois

Goaltenders

- 1 Jacques Plante
- 1 Charlie Hodge (Sub)
- 1 Gerry McNeil (Spare-did not play)

=== Coaching and administrative staff ===
- Hartland Molson (President/Owner)
- Frank Selke Sr. (Manager), Ken Reardon (Vice President)
- Toe Blake (Coach)
- Hector Dubois (Trainer), Larry Aubut (Asst. Trainer)
- Camile DesRoches^, Frank Selke Jr.^ (Publicity Directors)
- ^- on the team picture, but missing from the Stanley Cup.

== Engraving notes ==
Every player whose name was engraved on the Stanley Cup in 1957 also appeared on the Cup in 1958, the only time this had occurred in NHL history for repeat champions. In addition, four players' names appeared on the Cup in 1958 that were not present in 1957: Charlie Hodge, Ab MacDonald, Marcel Bonin and Albert Langlois. The only other change was in the name of the owner, as Hartland Molson had taken over the Canadiens from William Northey and Donat Raymond. Thirteen names on the 1958 Cup are members of the Hockey Hall of Fame: players Jean Beliveau, Bernie Geoffrion, Doug Harvey, Tom Johnson, Dickie Moore, Bert Olmstead, Jacques Plante, Henri Richard and Maurice Richard, and non-players Hartland Molson, Ken Reardon, Frank Selke Sr. and Coach Hector 'Toe' Blake (inducted as a player).

- In 1958, the NHL decided to change the look of the Stanley Cup again. The new-look Stanley Cup to last until 1992 for the Stanley Cup 100th anniversary. The Stanley Cup bowl renamed the same with 1903 to 1906 winning teams listed on the bowl, along with Paddy Moran, Fred Taylor and several installs. Inside the bowl are both 1907 Kenora Thistles, 1907 Wanderers, plus 20 members of the Wanderers. Also included are 9 members of 1915 Vancouver, BC and Harry Broadbent.
- Underneath are 6 small rings or bands. They include teams' winning members' names from 1924 to 1927, and 1929. The winning team names only from 1893 to 1902, & 1909 to 1918, but missing 1908-10 Montreal Wanderers, 1911 Ottawa Senators & Toronto Arenas; that ring included 3 non-winners. 1915 NHA Champion Ottawa, 1916 PCHA Champion Portland, 1918 PCHA Champion Vancouver
- A Shoulder sits between the smaller and larger rings. It includes all the Stanley Cup-winning team names from 1893 to 1992. This includes the seven teams that did not put their team name on it and the unfinished 1919 Stanley Cup Final. (1908 Montreal Wanderers, 1910 Montreal Wanderers, 1911 Ottawa Senators, 1918 Toronto Arenas, 1919 No Decision Montreal Canadiens Seattle Metropolitans, 1920 Ottawa Senators, 1921 Ottawa Senators, 1922 Toronto St. Pats, and 1923 Ottawa Senators.)
- There were five larger rings under the shoulder to include 13 winning seasons per ring. Ring one: 1928 to 1940, ring two: 1941 to 1953, ring three: 1954 to 1958, with more teams to be added to ring three (the 1957 Montreal Canadiens team were finally added in 1958). Ring four and ring five were blank. The last ring was filled in 1992 for the Stanley Cup 100th anniversary. All the rings below the shoulder are now identical in size. The Cup remained the same height, 34 1/4 inches and 35 1/2 pounds.
- 1928 Boston Bruins team members were engraved twice (members missing from both engravings) on a smaller band with 1927 Ottawa Senators and on the first of the large rings. 1915 Vancouver Millionaires team was listed three times. Once on the shoulder, once on one of the smaller bands (rings), and inside the cup with team name and nine winning members.
- _The new larger rings were not engraved the same as the previous rings. Some names were added, others missing, many first names/positions were spelt differently, and most spelling mistakes were fixed; many spelling mistakes were made.
- -Note the Stanley Cup has not changed size or shape since 1958. (See 1992 Stanley Cup Final for the next change in the Stanley Cup engraving plates.)

== See also ==
- 1957–58 Boston Bruins season
- 1957–58 Montreal Canadiens season
- 1957–58 NHL season

Preceded by Montreal Canadiens; 1957	Montreal Canadiens; Stanley Cup champions 1958	Succeeded by Montreal Canadiens; 1959
