= 1957–58 Montreal Canadiens season =

NHL hockey team season (won Stanley Cup)

1957–58 Montreal Canadiens
- Stanley Cup champions
- Prince of Wales Trophy winners
- League: 1st NHL
- 1957–58 record: 43–17–10
- Home record: 23–8–4
- Road record: 20–9–6
- Goals for: 250
- Goals against: 158

Team information
- General manager: Frank J. Selke
- Coach: Toe Blake
- Captain: Maurice Richard
- Arena: Montreal Forum

Team leaders
- Goals: Dickie Moore (36)
- Assists: Henri Richard (52)
- Points: Dickie Moore (84)
- Penalty minutes: Doug Harvey (131)
- Wins: Jacques Plante (34)
- Goals against average: Jacques Plante (2.11)

The 1957–58 Montreal Canadiens season was the club's 49th season of play. The Canadiens won their third-straight Stanley Cup and the tenth in club history.

== Regular season ==
- October 19, 1957 – Maurice Richard scored a goal at 15:52 of the first period. Richard became the first player to score 500 goals in a career.
- Hockey's colour barrier was broken in Montreal. Midway through his second minor-league season with the Quebec Aces, Willie O'Ree was called up to the Boston Bruins of the NHL to replace an injured player. O'Ree made his NHL debut with the Bruins on January 18, 1958, against the Montreal Canadiens, becoming the first black player in league history.

=== Final standings ===
National Hockey League
		GP	W	L	T	GF	GA	DIFF	Pts
1	Montreal Canadiens	70	43	17	10	250	158	+92	96
2	New York Rangers	70	32	25	13	195	188	+7	77
3	Detroit Red Wings	70	29	29	12	176	207	−31	70
4	Boston Bruins	70	27	28	15	199	194	+5	69
5	Chicago Black Hawks	70	24	39	7	163	202	−39	55
6	Toronto Maple Leafs	70	21	38	11	192	226	−34	53

=== Record vs. opponents ===
1957–58 NHL Records
Team	BOS	CHI	DET	MTL	NYR	TOR
Boston	—	7–3–4	8–5–1	3–9–2	6–5–3	3–6–5
Chicago	3–7–4	—	7–7	3–10–1	4–9–1	7–6–1
Detroit	5–8–1	7–7	—	3–7–4	4–5–5	10–2–2
Montreal	9–3–2	10–3–1	7–3–4	—	6–6–2	11–2–1
New York	5–6–3	9–4–1	5–4–5	6–6–2	—	7–5–2
Toronto	6–3–5	6–7–1	2–10–2	2–11–1	5–7–2	—

== Schedule and results ==
1957–58 regular season
October

Game	Result	Date	Score	Opponent	Record
1	W	October 10, 1957	5–1	Chicago Black Hawks (1957–58)	1–0–0
2	T	October 12, 1957	2–2	New York Rangers (1957–58)	1–0–1
3	W	October 13, 1957	6–0	@ Detroit Red Wings (1957–58)	2–0–1
4	T	October 15, 1957	3–3	@ Chicago Black Hawks (1957–58)	2–0–2
5	W	October 17, 1957	9–3	Toronto Maple Leafs (1957–58)	3–0–2
6	W	October 19, 1957	3–1	Chicago Black Hawks (1957–58)	4–0–2
7	W	October 26, 1957	4–3	Boston Bruins (1957–58)	5–0–2
8	L	October 27, 1957	1–4	@ New York Rangers (1957–58)	5–1–2
9	W	October 30, 1957	6–2	@ Toronto Maple Leafs (1957–58)	6–1–2
10	L	October 31, 1957	1–3	Toronto Maple Leafs (1957–58)	6–2–2

November

Game	Result	Date	Score	Opponent	Record
11	W	November 2, 1957	6–3	Detroit Red Wings (1957–58)	7–2–2
12	W	November 7, 1957	6–0	Detroit Red Wings (1957–58)	8–2–2
13	W	November 9, 1957	4–2	Boston Bruins (1957–58)	9–2–2
14	W	November 13, 1957	4–2	@ Toronto Maple Leafs (1957–58)	10–2–2
15	L	November 16, 1957	2–4	New York Rangers (1957–58)	10–3–2
16	L	November 17, 1957	2–4	@ New York Rangers (1957–58)	10–4–2
17	W	November 23, 1957	4–2	@ Boston Bruins (1957–58)	11–4–2
18	T	November 24, 1957	3–3	@ Detroit Red Wings (1957–58)	11–4–3
19	W	November 28, 1957	2–0	@ Chicago Black Hawks (1957–58)	12–4–3
20	W	November 30, 1957	6–1	Chicago Black Hawks (1957–58)	13–4–3

December

Game	Result	Date	Score	Opponent	Record
21	W	December 1, 1957	4–1	@ Boston Bruins (1957–58)	14–4–3
22	T	December 4, 1957	0–0	@ Toronto Maple Leafs (1957–58)	14–4–4
23	W	December 5, 1957	4–3	Toronto Maple Leafs (1957–58)	15–4–4
24	L	December 7, 1957	1–2	Detroit Red Wings (1957–58)	15–5–4
25	W	December 8, 1957	3–1	@ Detroit Red Wings (1957–58)	16–5–4
26	W	December 12, 1957	3–2	New York Rangers (1957–58)	17–5–4
27	T	December 14, 1957	1–1	Boston Bruins (1957–58)	17–5–5
28	W	December 15, 1957	2–0	@ Chicago Black Hawks (1957–58)	18–5–5
29	L	December 18, 1957	4–5	@ New York Rangers (1957–58)	18–6–5
30	L	December 21, 1957	2–4	New York Rangers (1957–58)	18–7–5
31	W	December 22, 1957	4–1	@ Boston Bruins (1957–58)	19–7–5
32	L	December 25, 1957	4–5	@ Toronto Maple Leafs (1957–58)	19–8–5
33	W	December 28, 1957	6–0	Detroit Red Wings (1957–58)	20–8–5
34	W	December 29, 1957	4–3	@ New York Rangers (1957–58)	21–8–5

January

Game	Result	Date	Score	Opponent	Record
35	W	January 1, 1958	4–3	@ Boston Bruins (1957–58)	22–8–5
36	W	January 2, 1958	5–2	Toronto Maple Leafs (1957–58)	23–8–5
37	W	January 4, 1958	2–1	Detroit Red Wings (1957–58)	24–8–5
38	W	January 5, 1958	4–0	@ New York Rangers (1957–58)	25–8–5
39	W	January 9, 1958	11–3	Chicago Black Hawks (1957–58)	26–8–5
40	W	January 11, 1958	9–3	New York Rangers (1957–58)	27–8–5
41	L	January 12, 1958	1–7	@ Chicago Black Hawks (1957–58)	27–9–5
42	W	January 16, 1958	5–2	Toronto Maple Leafs (1957–58)	28–9–5
43	L	January 18, 1958	0–3	Boston Bruins (1957–58)	28–10–5
44	W	January 19, 1958	6–2	@ Boston Bruins (1957–58)	29–10–5
45	W	January 22, 1958	2–0	@ Toronto Maple Leafs (1957–58)	30–10–5
46	W	January 25, 1958	2–1	Chicago Black Hawks (1957–58)	31–10–5
47	L	January 26, 1958	2–4	@ Detroit Red Wings (1957–58)	31–11–5
48	W	January 30, 1958	7–0	Detroit Red Wings (1957–58)	32–11–5

February

Game	Result	Date	Score	Opponent	Record
49	W	February 1, 1958	3–1	Boston Bruins (1957–58)	33–11–5
50	W	February 2, 1958	3–1	@ Chicago Black Hawks (1957–58)	34–11–5
51	T	February 6, 1958	1–1	@ Detroit Red Wings (1957–58)	34–11–6
52	L	February 8, 1958	2–3	Chicago Black Hawks (1957–58)	34–12–6
53	W	February 9, 1958	3–1	@ New York Rangers (1957–58)	35–12–6
54	W	February 12, 1958	5–2	@ Toronto Maple Leafs (1957–58)	36–12–6
55	T	February 15, 1958	2–2	@ Boston Bruins (1957–58)	36–12–7
56	L	February 16, 1958	0–4	@ Chicago Black Hawks (1957–58)	36–13–7
57	W	February 20, 1958	4–0	Boston Bruins (1957–58)	37–13–7
58	T	February 22, 1958	2–2	New York Rangers (1957–58)	37–13–8
59	T	February 23, 1958	3–3	@ Detroit Red Wings (1957–58)	37–13–9
60	W	February 27, 1958	4–1	Toronto Maple Leafs (1957–58)	38–13–9

March

Game	Result	Date	Score	Opponent	Record
61	T	March 1, 1958	2–2	Detroit Red Wings (1957–58)	38–13–10
62	L	March 8, 1958	2–3	New York Rangers (1957–58)	38–14–10
63	W	March 9, 1958	4–1	@ Chicago Black Hawks (1957–58)	39–14–10
64	W	March 12, 1958	5–3	@ Toronto Maple Leafs (1957–58)	40–14–10
65	L	March 13, 1958	3–7	@ Boston Bruins (1957–58)	40–15–10
66	W	March 15, 1958	4–1	Chicago Black Hawks (1957–58)	41–15–10
67	W	March 16, 1958	3–2	@ New York Rangers (1957–58)	42–15–10
68	W	March 20, 1958	7–4	Toronto Maple Leafs (1957–58)	43–15–10
69	L	March 22, 1958	5–8	Boston Bruins (1957–58)	43–16–10
70	L	March 23, 1958	2–4	@ Detroit Red Wings (1957–58)	43–17–10

Legend: Win (2 points) Loss (0 points) Tie (1 point)

== Playoffs ==
In the semi-finals, Montreal played third place Detroit. After Detroit traded Ted Lindsay because of his union efforts, Detroit was a team in disarray. Montreal defeated the Red Wings in four straight games to reach the finals.

=== Stanley Cup Finals ===
Rocket Richard, was the top goal scorer during the playoffs with 11. In game five he notched his third final series overtime goal of his career and sixth playoff overtime goal of his career.

Boston Bruins vs. Montreal Canadiens

Date	Away	Score	Home	Score	Notes
April 8	Boston	1	Montreal	2	
April 10	Boston	5	Montreal	2	
April 13	Montreal	3	Boston	0	
April 15	Montreal	1	Boston	3	
April 17	Boston	2	Montreal	3	OT
April 20	Montreal	5	Boston	3	

Montreal won the best-of-seven series 4 games to 2.

== Player statistics ==
=== Regular season ===
==== Scoring ====
Player	Pos	GP	G	A	Pts	PIM
Dickie Moore	LW	70	36	48	84	65
Henri Richard	C	67	28	52	80	56
Jean Beliveau	C	55	27	32	59	93
Claude Provost	RW	70	19	32	51	71
Bernie Geoffrion	RW	42	27	23	50	51
Phil Goyette	C	70	9	37	46	8
Donnie Marshall	LW	68	22	19	41	14
Doug Harvey	D	68	9	32	41	131
Marcel Bonin	W	66	15	24	39	37
Bert Olmstead	LW	57	9	28	37	71
Maurice Richard	RW	28	15	19	34	28
Andre Pronovost	LW	66	16	12	28	55
Dollard St. Laurent	D	65	3	20	23	68
Tom Johnson	D	66	3	18	21	75
Jean-Guy Talbot	D	55	4	15	19	65
Gene Achtymichuk	C	16	3	5	8	2
Floyd Curry	RW	42	2	3	5	8
Connie Broden	C	3	2	1	3	0
Stan Smrke	LW	5	0	3	3	0
Bob Turner	D	66	0	3	3	30
Murray Balfour	RW	3	1	1	2	4
Ralph Backstrom	C	2	0	1	1	0
Jack Bownass	D	4	0	1	1	0
Ken Mosdell	C	2	0	1	1	0
Don Aiken	G	1	0	0	0	0
Len Broderick	G	1	0	0	0	0
Billy Carter	C	1	0	0	0	0
Charlie Hodge	G	12	0	0	0	0
Claude Laforge	LW	5	0	0	0	0
Albert Langlois	D	1	0	0	0	0
Jacques Plante	G	57	0	0	0	13

==== Goaltending ====
Player	MIN	GP	W	L	T	GA	GAA	SO
Jacques Plante	3386	57	34	14	8	119	2.11	9
Charlie Hodge	720	12	8	2	2	31	2.58	1
Len Broderick	60	1	1	0	0	2	2.00	0
Don Aiken	34	1	0	1	0	6	10.59	0
Team:	4200	70	43	17	10	158	2.26	10

=== Playoffs ===
==== Scoring ====
Player	Pos	GP	G	A	Pts	PIM
Maurice Richard	RW	10	11	4	15	10
Jean Beliveau	C	10	4	8	12	10
Bernie Geoffrion	RW	10	6	5	11	2
Dickie Moore	LW	10	4	7	11	4
Doug Harvey	D	10	2	9	11	16
Henri Richard	C	10	1	7	8	11
Phil Goyette	C	10	4	1	5	4
Claude Provost	RW	10	1	3	4	8
Bert Olmstead	LW	9	0	3	3	0
Jean-Guy Talbot	D	10	0	3	3	12
Andre Pronovost	LW	10	2	0	2	16
Donnie Marshall	LW	10	0	2	2	4
Marcel Bonin	W	9	0	1	1	2
Albert Langlois	D	7	0	1	1	4
Connie Broden	C	1	0	0	0	0
Floyd Curry	RW	7	0	0	0	2
Tom Johnson	D	2	0	0	0	0
Ab McDonald	LW	2	0	0	0	2
Jacques Plante	G	10	0	0	0	2
Dollard St. Laurent	D	5	0	0	0	10
Bob Turner	D	10	0	0	0	2

==== Goaltending ====
Player	MIN	GP	W	L	GA	GAA	SO
Jacques Plante	618	10	8	2	20	1.94	1
Team:	618	10	8	2	20	1.94	1

Note:

Pos = Position;GP = Games played; G = Goals; A = Assists; Pts = Points; PIM = Penalty minutes; +/- = Plus/minus; PPG = Power-play goals; SHG = Short-handed goals; GWG = Game-winning goals
Pos = Position;GP = Games played; Min, TOI = Minutes played; W = Wins; L = Losses; T,T/OT = Ties; OTL = Overtime losses; GA = Goals-against; GAA = Goals-against average; SO = Shutouts; SA = Shots against; SV = Shots saved;SV% = Save percentage;

== See also ==
- 1957–58 NHL season
- List of Stanley Cup champions
