= 1957–58 Boston Bruins season =

NHL team season

1957–58 Boston Bruins
- League: 4th NHL
- 1957–58 record: 27–28–15
- Home record: 15–14–6
- Road record: 12–14–9
- Goals for: 199
- Goals against: 194

Team information
- General manager: Lynn Patrick
- Coach: Milt Schmidt
- Captain: Fernie Flaman
- Arena: Boston Garden

Team leaders
- Goals: Bronco Horvath (30)
- Assists: Fleming MacKell (40)
- Points: Bronco Horvath (66)
- Penalty minutes: Fleming MacKell (72)
- Wins: Don Simmons (15)
- Goals against average: Don Simmons (2.42)

The 1957–58 Boston Bruins season saw the Bruins finish in fourth place in the National Hockey League (NHL) with a record of 27 wins, 28 losses, and 15 ties for 69 points. They defeated the New York Rangers in six games in the Semi-finals before losing the Stanley Cup Final, also in six games, to the Montreal Canadiens.

== Regular season ==
=== Willie O'Ree ===
Midway through his second minor-league season with the Quebec Aces, O'Ree was called up to the Boston Bruins of the NHL to replace an injured player. O'Ree made his NHL debut with the Bruins on January 18, 1958, against the Montreal Canadiens, becoming the first black player in league history. He played in only two games that year.

=== Season standings ===
National Hockey League
		GP	W	L	T	GF	GA	DIFF	Pts
1	Montreal Canadiens	70	43	17	10	250	158	+92	96
2	New York Rangers	70	32	25	13	195	188	+7	77
3	Detroit Red Wings	70	29	29	12	176	207	−31	70
4	Boston Bruins	70	27	28	15	199	194	+5	69
5	Chicago Black Hawks	70	24	39	7	163	202	−39	55
6	Toronto Maple Leafs	70	21	38	11	192	226	−34	53

=== Record vs. opponents ===
1957–58 NHL Records
Team	BOS	CHI	DET	MTL	NYR	TOR
Boston	—	7–3–4	8–5–1	3–9–2	6–5–3	3–6–5
Chicago	3–7–4	—	7–7	3–10–1	4–9–1	7–6–1
Detroit	5–8–1	7–7	—	3–7–4	4–5–5	10–2–2
Montreal	9–3–2	10–3–1	7–3–4	—	6–6–2	11–2–1
New York	5–6–3	9–4–1	5–4–5	6–6–2	—	7–5–2
Toronto	6–3–5	6–7–1	2–10–2	2–11–1	5–7–2	—

== Schedule and results ==
1957–58 regular season
October

Game	Result	Date	Score	Opponent	Record
1	W	October 12, 1957	3–1	Chicago Black Hawks (1957–58)	1–0–0
2	W	October 13, 1957	3–1	New York Rangers (1957–58)	2–0–0
3	W	October 16, 1957	6–2	@ New York Rangers (1957–58)	3–0–0
4	W	October 17, 1957	5–1	@ Detroit Red Wings (1957–58)	4–0–0
5	L	October 19, 1957	0–7	@ Toronto Maple Leafs (1957–58)	4–1–0
6	L	October 22, 1957	1–2	@ Chicago Black Hawks (1957–58)	4–2–0
7	L	October 24, 1957	3–4	@ Detroit Red Wings (1957–58)	4–3–0
8	L	October 26, 1957	3–4	@ Montreal Canadiens (1957–58)	4–4–0
9	L	October 31, 1957	0–3	New York Rangers (1957–58)	4–5–0

November

Game	Result	Date	Score	Opponent	Record
10	L	November 2, 1957	0–5	@ New York Rangers (1957–58)	4–6–0
11	W	November 3, 1957	4–0	Detroit Red Wings (1957–58)	5–6–0
12	L	November 7, 1957	3–5	Toronto Maple Leafs (1957–58)	5–7–0
13	L	November 9, 1957	2–4	@ Montreal Canadiens (1957–58)	5–8–0
14	W	November 10, 1957	4–2	Detroit Red Wings (1957–58)	6–8–0
15	W	November 14, 1957	5–2	Chicago Black Hawks (1957–58)	7–8–0
16	W	November 16, 1957	4–2	@ Toronto Maple Leafs (1957–58)	8–8–0
17	T	November 17, 1957	2–2	Toronto Maple Leafs (1957–58)	8–8–1
18	L	November 23, 1957	2–4	Montreal Canadiens (1957–58)	8–9–1
19	T	November 24, 1957	2–2	@ Chicago Black Hawks (1957–58)	8–9–2
20	W	November 27, 1957	5–2	@ New York Rangers (1957–58)	9–9–2
21	W	November 28, 1957	1–0	New York Rangers (1957–58)	10–9–2
22	L	November 30, 1957	2–3	@ Toronto Maple Leafs (1957–58)	10–10–2

December

Game	Result	Date	Score	Opponent	Record
23	L	December 1, 1957	1–4	Montreal Canadiens (1957–58)	10–11–2
24	W	December 5, 1957	7–2	Detroit Red Wings (1957–58)	11–11–2
25	T	December 7, 1957	2–2	Chicago Black Hawks (1957–58)	11–11–3
26	W	December 8, 1957	3–0	@ Chicago Black Hawks (1957–58)	12–11–3
27	L	December 12, 1957	2–3	@ Detroit Red Wings (1957–58)	12–12–3
28	T	December 14, 1957	1–1	@ Montreal Canadiens (1957–58)	12–12–4
29	L	December 15, 1957	1–3	Toronto Maple Leafs (1957–58)	12–13–4
30	T	December 19, 1957	3–3	New York Rangers (1957–58)	12–13–5
31	T	December 21, 1957	3–3	@ Toronto Maple Leafs (1957–58)	12–13–6
32	L	December 22, 1957	1–4	Montreal Canadiens (1957–58)	12–14–6
33	W	December 25, 1957	4–1	Detroit Red Wings (1957–58)	13–14–6
34	T	December 28, 1957	0–0	@ Chicago Black Hawks (1957–58)	13–14–7
35	T	December 29, 1957	2–2	@ Detroit Red Wings (1957–58)	13–14–8

January

Game	Result	Date	Score	Opponent	Record
36	L	January 1, 1958	3–4	Montreal Canadiens (1957–58)	13–15–8
37	W	January 4, 1958	7–4	@ New York Rangers (1957–58)	14–15–8
38	L	January 5, 1958	3–4	@ Chicago Black Hawks (1957–58)	14–16–8
39	L	January 9, 1958	1–6	@ Detroit Red Wings (1957–58)	14–17–8
40	T	January 11, 1958	2–2	@ Toronto Maple Leafs (1957–58)	14–17–9
41	L	January 12, 1958	3–5	Toronto Maple Leafs (1957–58)	14–18–9
42	L	January 16, 1958	2–3	New York Rangers (1957–58)	14–19–9
43	W	January 18, 1958	3–0	@ Montreal Canadiens (1957–58)	15–19–9
44	L	January 19, 1958	2–6	Montreal Canadiens (1957–58)	15–20–9
45	W	January 23, 1958	4–3	Chicago Black Hawks (1957–58)	16–20–9
46	W	January 25, 1958	5–3	Detroit Red Wings (1957–58)	17–20–9
47	T	January 26, 1958	3–3	Toronto Maple Leafs (1957–58)	17–20–10
48	T	January 29, 1958	1–1	@ New York Rangers (1957–58)	17–20–11

February

Game	Result	Date	Score	Opponent	Record
49	L	February 1, 1958	1–3	@ Montreal Canadiens (1957–58)	17–21–11
50	W	February 2, 1958	4–3	New York Rangers (1957–58)	18–21–11
51	L	February 6, 1958	1–4	Chicago Black Hawks (1957–58)	18–22–11
52	W	February 8, 1958	7–3	@ Toronto Maple Leafs (1957–58)	19–22–11
53	L	February 9, 1958	0–2	Toronto Maple Leafs (1957–58)	19–23–11
54	W	February 13, 1958	5–0	Detroit Red Wings (1957–58)	20–23–11
55	T	February 15, 1958	2–2	Montreal Canadiens (1957–58)	20–23–12
56	L	February 16, 1958	2–3	@ New York Rangers (1957–58)	20–24–12
57	L	February 20, 1958	0–4	@ Montreal Canadiens (1957–58)	20–25–12
58	L	February 22, 1958	1–6	@ Detroit Red Wings (1957–58)	20–26–12
59	W	February 23, 1958	2–0	@ Chicago Black Hawks (1957–58)	21–26–12

March

Game	Result	Date	Score	Opponent	Record
60	W	March 1, 1958	3–2	@ Chicago Black Hawks (1957–58)	22–26–12
61	W	March 4, 1958	2–1	@ Detroit Red Wings (1957–58)	23–26–12
62	T	March 6, 1958	4–4	Chicago Black Hawks (1957–58)	23–26–13
63	T	March 8, 1958	3–3	@ Toronto Maple Leafs (1957–58)	23–26–14
64	W	March 9, 1958	7–0	Toronto Maple Leafs (1957–58)	24–26–14
65	W	March 13, 1958	7–3	Montreal Canadiens (1957–58)	25–26–14
66	L	March 15, 1958	0–4	New York Rangers (1957–58)	25–27–14
67	L	March 16, 1958	3–6	Detroit Red Wings (1957–58)	25–28–14
68	T	March 19, 1958	1–1	@ New York Rangers (1957–58)	25–28–15
69	W	March 22, 1958	8–5	@ Montreal Canadiens (1957–58)	26–28–15
70	W	March 23, 1958	7–5	Chicago Black Hawks (1957–58)	27–28–15

Legend: Win (2 points) Loss (0 points) Tie (1 point)

== Playoffs ==
Boston defeated the New York Rangers (4–2) in the semi-final to advance to the Cup Final against the Montreal Canadiens. The Canadiens, in the middle of their five-year Cup champion run, defeated the Bruins four games to two.

== Player statistics ==
=== Regular season ===
Scoring

Player	Pos	GP	G	A	Pts	PIM
Bronco Horvath	C	67	30	36	66	71
Fleming MacKell	C	70	20	40	60	72
Don McKenney	C	70	28	30	58	22
Vic Stasiuk	LW	70	21	35	56	55
John Bucyk	LW	68	21	31	52	57
Jerry Toppazzini	RW	64	25	24	49	51
Larry Regan	RW	59	11	28	39	22
Allan Stanley	D	69	6	25	31	37
Larry Hillman	D	70	3	19	22	60
Leo Labine	RW	62	7	14	21	60
Doug Mohns	LW/D	54	5	16	21	28
Real Chevrefils	LW	44	9	9	18	21
Fern Flaman	D	66	0	15	15	71
Buddy Boone	RW	34	5	3	8	28
Norm Johnson	C	15	2	3	5	8
Bob Armstrong	D	47	1	4	5	66
Jack Bionda	D	42	1	4	5	50
Johnny Peirson	RW	53	2	2	4	10
Leo Boivin	D	33	0	4	4	54
Jack Caffery	C	7	1	0	1	2
Gerry Ehman	RW	1	1	0	1	0
Bob Beckett	C	9	0	0	0	2
Claude Evans	G	1	0	0	0	0
Harry Lumley	G	24	0	0	0	2
Al Millar	G	6	0	0	0	0
Willie O'Ree	W	2	0	0	0	0
Harry Pidhirny	C	2	0	0	0	0
Don Simmons	G	39	0	0	0	0
Lefty Wilson	G	1	0	0	0	0

Goaltending

Player	MIN	GP	W	L	T	GA	GAA	SO
Don Simmons	2288	39	15	14	9	92	2.41	5
Harry Lumley	1440	24	11	10	3	70	2.92	3
Al Millar	360	6	1	4	1	25	4.17	0
Claude Evans	60	1	0	0	1	4	4.00	0
Lefty Wilson	52	1	0	0	1	1	1.15	0
Team:	4200	70	27	28	15	192	2.74	8

=== Playoffs ===
Scoring

Player	Pos	GP	G	A	Pts	PIM
Fleming MacKell	C	12	5	14	19	12
Don McKenney	C	12	9	8	17	0
Doug Mohns	LW/D	12	3	10	13	18
Jerry Toppazzini	RW	12	9	3	12	2
Larry Regan	RW	12	3	8	11	6
Bronco Horvath	C	12	5	3	8	8
Vic Stasiuk	LW	12	0	5	5	13
Norm Johnson	C	12	4	0	4	6
Fern Flaman	D	12	2	2	4	10
Allan Stanley	D	12	1	3	4	6
John Bucyk	LW	12	0	4	4	16
Leo Boivin	D	12	0	3	3	21
Buddy Boone	RW	12	1	1	2	13
Larry Hillman	D	11	0	2	2	6
Leo Labine	RW	11	0	2	2	10
Johnny Peirson	RW	5	0	1	1	0
Real Chevrefils	LW	1	0	0	0	0
Harry Lumley	G	1	0	0	0	0
Don Simmons	G	11	0	0	0	0

Goaltending

Player	MIN	GP	W	L	GA	GAA	SO
Don Simmons	671	11	6	5	25	2.24	1
Harry Lumley	60	1	0	1	5	5.00	0
Team:	731	12	6	6	30	2.46	1

Note:

Pos = Position;GP = Games played; G = Goals; A = Assists; Pts = Points; PIM = Penalty minutes; +/- = Plus/minus; PPG = Power-play goals; SHG = Short-handed goals; GWG = Game-winning goals
Pos = Position;GP = Games played; Min, TOI = Minutes played; W = Wins; L = Losses; T,T/OT = Ties; OTL = Overtime losses; GA = Goals-against; GAA = Goals-against average; SO = Shutouts; SA = Shots against; SV = Shots saved;SV% = Save percentage;

== Awards and honors ==
=== Milestones ===
Player is still active or individual record

Regular Season
Player	Milestone	Reached
Willie O'Ree	1st NHL Game	January 18, 1958
