= 1957–58 NHL transactions =

The following is a list of all team-to-team transactions that have occurred in the National Hockey League (NHL) during the 1957–58 NHL season. It lists which team each player has been traded to and for which player(s) or other consideration(s), if applicable.

== Transactions ==
June, 1957 (exact date unknown)	To Chicago Black Hawks Ron Murphy	To New York Rangers Hank Ciesla
June 4, 1957	To Toronto Maple Leafs Pete Conacher	To New York Rangers $15,000 cash
June 15, 1957	To Boston Bruins cash	To Detroit Red Wings Guyle Fielder
July 10, 1957	To Boston Bruins John Bucyk cash	To Detroit Red Wings Terry Sawchuk
July 23, 1957	To Detroit Red Wings Hank Bassen; Forbes Kennedy; Bill Preston; Johnny Wilson	To Chicago Black Hawks Glenn Hall; Ted Lindsay
September 30, 1957	To Toronto Maple Leafs Paul Masnick	To Montreal Canadiens cash
November 18, 1957	To Toronto Maple Leafs $15,000 cash	To New York Rangers rights to Pete Conacher
December 17, 1957	To Detroit Red Wings Bob Bailey; Hec Lalande; Jack McIntyre; Nick Mickoski	To Chicago Black Hawks Billy Dea; Bill Dineen; Lorne Ferguson; Dutch Reibel
January, 1958 (exact date unknown)	To Boston Bruins Harry Lumley	To Chicago Black Hawks cash
