= 1957–58 Detroit Red Wings season =

National Hockey League team season

1957–58 Detroit Red Wings
- League: 3rd NHL
- 1957–58 record: 29–29–12
- Home record: 16–11–8
- Road record: 13–18–4
- Goals for: 176
- Goals against: 207

Team information
- General manager: Jack Adams
- Coach: Jimmy Skinner; Sid Abel
- Captain: Red Kelly
- Alternate captains: Alex Delvecchio; Gordie Howe
- Arena: Detroit Olympia

Team leaders
- Goals: Gordie Howe (33)
- Assists: Gordie Howe (44)
- Points: Gordie Howe (77)
- Penalty minutes: Forbes Kennedy (135)
- Wins: Terry Sawchuk (29)
- Goals against average: Terry Sawchuk (2.94)

The 1957–58 Detroit Red Wings season was the Red Wings' 32nd season. The season involved sending Ted Lindsay and Glenn Hall to the Chicago Black Hawks.

== Offseason ==
- July 23, 1957 – The Chicago Black Hawks acquired Ted Lindsay and Glenn Hall from the Detroit Red Wings in exchange for Johnny Wilson, Forbes Kennedy, Hank Bassen, and Bill Preston.

== Regular season ==
=== Final standings ===
National Hockey League
| | | GP | W | L | T | GF | GA | DIFF | Pts |
|---|---|---|---|---|---|---|---|---|---|
| 1 | Montreal Canadiens | 70 | 43 | 17 | 10 | 250 | 158 | +92 | 96 |
| 2 | New York Rangers | 70 | 32 | 25 | 13 | 195 | 188 | +7 | 77 |
| 3 | Detroit Red Wings | 70 | 29 | 29 | 12 | 176 | 207 | −31 | 70 |
| 4 | Boston Bruins | 70 | 27 | 28 | 15 | 199 | 194 | +5 | 69 |
| 5 | Chicago Black Hawks | 70 | 24 | 39 | 7 | 163 | 202 | −39 | 55 |
| 6 | Toronto Maple Leafs | 70 | 21 | 38 | 11 | 192 | 226 | −34 | 53 |

=== Record vs. opponents ===
1957–58 NHL Records
| Team | BOS | CHI | DET | MTL | NYR | TOR |
|---|---|---|---|---|---|---|
| Boston | — | 7–3–4 | 8–5–1 | 3–9–2 | 6–5–3 | 3–6–5 |
| Chicago | 3–7–4 | — | 7–7 | 3–10–1 | 4–9–1 | 7–6–1 |
| Detroit | 5–8–1 | 7–7 | — | 3–7–4 | 4–5–5 | 10–2–2 |
| Montreal | 9–3–2 | 10–3–1 | 7–3–4 | — | 6–6–2 | 11–2–1 |
| New York | 5–6–3 | 9–4–1 | 5–4–5 | 6–6–2 | — | 7–5–2 |
| Toronto | 6–3–5 | 6–7–1 | 2–10–2 | 2–11–1 | 5–7–2 | — |

== Schedule and results ==
1957–58 regular season
October

| Game | Result | Date | Score | Opponent | Record |
|---|---|---|---|---|---|
| 1 | L | October 10, 1957 | 2–3 | New York Rangers (1957–58) | 0–1–0 |
| 2 | W | October 12, 1957 | 5–3 | @ Toronto Maple Leafs (1957–58) | 1–1–0 |
| 3 | L | October 13, 1957 | 0–6 | Montreal Canadiens (1957–58) | 1–2–0 |
| 4 | L | October 17, 1957 | 1–5 | Boston Bruins (1957–58) | 1–3–0 |
| 5 | W | October 20, 1957 | 3–1 | Toronto Maple Leafs (1957–58) | 2–3–0 |
| 6 | W | October 24, 1957 | 4–3 | Boston Bruins (1957–58) | 3–3–0 |
| 7 | L | October 27, 1957 | 0–3 | Chicago Black Hawks (1957–58) | 3–4–0 |
| 8 | L | October 29, 1957 | 0–1 | @ Chicago Black Hawks (1957–58) | 3–5–0 |
| 9 | W | October 30, 1957 | 4–0 | @ New York Rangers (1957–58) | 4–5–0 |

November

| Game | Result | Date | Score | Opponent | Record |
|---|---|---|---|---|---|
| 10 | L | November 2, 1957 | 3–6 | @ Montreal Canadiens (1957–58) | 4–6–0 |
| 11 | L | November 3, 1957 | 0–4 | @ Boston Bruins (1957–58) | 4–7–0 |
| 12 | T | November 5, 1957 | 1–1 | New York Rangers (1957–58) | 4–7–1 |
| 13 | L | November 7, 1957 | 0–6 | @ Montreal Canadiens (1957–58) | 4–8–1 |
| 14 | T | November 9, 1957 | 3–3 | @ Toronto Maple Leafs (1957–58) | 4–8–2 |
| 15 | L | November 10, 1957 | 2–4 | @ Boston Bruins (1957–58) | 4–9–2 |
| 16 | W | November 16, 1957 | 1–0 | @ Chicago Black Hawks (1957–58) | 5–9–2 |
| 17 | L | November 17, 1957 | 2–3 | Chicago Black Hawks (1957–58) | 5–10–2 |
| 18 | T | November 20, 1957 | 1–1 | @ New York Rangers (1957–58) | 5–10–3 |
| 19 | W | November 23, 1957 | 2–1 | @ Toronto Maple Leafs (1957–58) | 6–10–3 |
| 20 | T | November 24, 1957 | 3–3 | Montreal Canadiens (1957–58) | 6–10–4 |
| 21 | T | November 28, 1957 | 3–3 | Toronto Maple Leafs (1957–58) | 6–10–5 |
| 22 | W | November 30, 1957 | 3–1 | @ New York Rangers (1957–58) | 7–10–5 |

December

| Game | Result | Date | Score | Opponent | Record |
|---|---|---|---|---|---|
| 23 | L | December 1, 1957 | 1–5 | New York Rangers (1957–58) | 7–11–5 |
| 24 | L | December 5, 1957 | 2–7 | @ Boston Bruins (1957–58) | 7–12–5 |
| 25 | W | December 7, 1957 | 2–1 | @ Montreal Canadiens (1957–58) | 8–12–5 |
| 26 | L | December 8, 1957 | 1–3 | Montreal Canadiens (1957–58) | 8–13–5 |
| 27 | W | December 12, 1957 | 3–2 | Boston Bruins (1957–58) | 9–13–5 |
| 28 | T | December 14, 1957 | 4–4 | New York Rangers (1957–58) | 9–13–6 |
| 29 | L | December 15, 1957 | 2–4 | @ New York Rangers (1957–58) | 9–14–6 |
| 30 | W | December 19, 1957 | 3–2 | Toronto Maple Leafs (1957–58) | 10–14–6 |
| 31 | W | December 21, 1957 | 5–3 | @ Chicago Black Hawks (1957–58) | 11–14–6 |
| 32 | W | December 22, 1957 | 2–0 | Chicago Black Hawks (1957–58) | 12–14–6 |
| 33 | L | December 25, 1957 | 1–4 | @ Boston Bruins (1957–58) | 12–15–6 |
| 34 | L | December 28, 1957 | 0–6 | @ Montreal Canadiens (1957–58) | 12–16–6 |
| 35 | T | December 29, 1957 | 2–2 | Boston Bruins (1957–58) | 12–16–7 |
| 36 | W | December 31, 1957 | 3–2 | Chicago Black Hawks (1957–58) | 13–16–7 |

January

| Game | Result | Date | Score | Opponent | Record |
|---|---|---|---|---|---|
| 37 | L | January 1, 1958 | 3–4 | @ Chicago Black Hawks (1957–58) | 13–17–7 |
| 38 | L | January 4, 1958 | 1–2 | @ Montreal Canadiens (1957–58) | 13–18–7 |
| 39 | W | January 5, 1958 | 3–2 | Toronto Maple Leafs (1957–58) | 14–18–7 |
| 40 | W | January 9, 1958 | 6–1 | Boston Bruins (1957–58) | 15–18–7 |
| 41 | W | January 11, 1958 | 4–1 | Chicago Black Hawks (1957–58) | 16–18–7 |
| 42 | W | January 12, 1958 | 3–2 | @ New York Rangers (1957–58) | 17–18–7 |
| 43 | W | January 16, 1958 | 3–2 | Chicago Black Hawks (1957–58) | 18–18–7 |
| 44 | L | January 18, 1958 | 1–2 | @ Toronto Maple Leafs (1957–58) | 18–19–7 |
| 45 | L | January 19, 1958 | 1–6 | New York Rangers (1957–58) | 18–20–7 |
| 46 | L | January 25, 1958 | 3–5 | @ Boston Bruins (1957–58) | 18–21–7 |
| 47 | W | January 26, 1958 | 4–2 | Montreal Canadiens (1957–58) | 19–21–7 |
| 48 | L | January 30, 1958 | 0–7 | @ Montreal Canadiens (1957–58) | 19–22–7 |

February

| Game | Result | Date | Score | Opponent | Record |
|---|---|---|---|---|---|
| 49 | L | February 1, 1958 | 2–9 | @ Toronto Maple Leafs (1957–58) | 19–23–7 |
| 50 | W | February 2, 1958 | 3–1 | Toronto Maple Leafs (1957–58) | 20–23–7 |
| 51 | T | February 6, 1958 | 1–1 | Montreal Canadiens (1957–58) | 20–23–8 |
| 52 | L | February 8, 1958 | 2–5 | New York Rangers (1957–58) | 20–24–8 |
| 53 | W | February 9, 1958 | 2–1 | @ Chicago Black Hawks (1957–58) | 21–24–8 |
| 54 | L | February 13, 1958 | 0–5 | @ Boston Bruins (1957–58) | 21–25–8 |
| 55 | W | February 15, 1958 | 6–3 | @ Toronto Maple Leafs (1957–58) | 22–25–8 |
| 56 | W | February 16, 1958 | 4–1 | Toronto Maple Leafs (1957–58) | 23–25–8 |
| 57 | W | February 22, 1958 | 6–1 | Boston Bruins (1957–58) | 24–25–8 |
| 58 | T | February 23, 1958 | 3–3 | Montreal Canadiens (1957–58) | 24–25–9 |

March

| Game | Result | Date | Score | Opponent | Record |
|---|---|---|---|---|---|
| 59 | T | March 1, 1958 | 2–2 | @ Montreal Canadiens (1957–58) | 24–25–10 |
| 60 | T | March 2, 1958 | 4–4 | @ New York Rangers (1957–58) | 24–25–11 |
| 61 | L | March 4, 1958 | 1–2 | Boston Bruins (1957–58) | 24–26–11 |
| 62 | L | March 8, 1958 | 3–4 | @ Chicago Black Hawks (1957–58) | 24–27–11 |
| 63 | W | March 9, 1958 | 4–2 | @ New York Rangers (1957–58) | 25–27–11 |
| 64 | T | March 11, 1958 | 2–2 | New York Rangers (1957–58) | 25–27–12 |
| 65 | W | March 15, 1958 | 3–1 | @ Toronto Maple Leafs (1957–58) | 26–27–12 |
| 66 | W | March 16, 1958 | 6–3 | @ Boston Bruins (1957–58) | 27–27–12 |
| 67 | W | March 18, 1958 | 4–2 | Toronto Maple Leafs (1957–58) | 28–27–12 |
| 68 | L | March 20, 1958 | 4–5 | @ Chicago Black Hawks (1957–58) | 28–28–12 |
| 69 | L | March 22, 1958 | 4–6 | Chicago Black Hawks (1957–58) | 28–29–12 |
| 70 | W | March 23, 1958 | 4–2 | Montreal Canadiens (1957–58) | 29–29–12 |

Legend: Win (2 points) Loss (0 points) Tie (1 point)

== Player statistics ==
=== Regular season ===
Scoring

| Player | Pos | GP | G | A | Pts | PIM |
|---|---|---|---|---|---|---|
| Gordie Howe | RW | 64 | 33 | 44 | 77 | 40 |
| Alex Delvecchio | C/LW | 70 | 21 | 38 | 59 | 22 |
| Norm Ullman | C | 69 | 23 | 28 | 51 | 38 |
| Johnny Wilson | LW | 70 | 12 | 27 | 39 | 14 |
| Red Kelly | D/C | 61 | 13 | 18 | 31 | 26 |
| Forbes Kennedy | C | 70 | 11 | 16 | 27 | 135 |
| Jack McIntyre | D | 41 | 15 | 7 | 22 | 4 |
| Nick Mickoski | LW | 37 | 8 | 12 | 20 | 30 |
| Marcel Pronovost | D | 62 | 2 | 18 | 20 | 52 |
| Warren Godfrey | D | 67 | 2 | 16 | 18 | 56 |
| Don Poile | C | 62 | 7 | 9 | 16 | 12 |
| Billy McNeill | RW | 35 | 5 | 10 | 15 | 29 |
| Bob Bailey | RW | 36 | 6 | 6 | 12 | 41 |
| Dutch Reibel | C | 29 | 4 | 5 | 9 | 4 |
| Billy Dea | LW | 29 | 4 | 4 | 8 | 6 |
| Al Arbour | D | 69 | 1 | 6 | 7 | 104 |
| Bill Dineen | RW | 22 | 2 | 4 | 6 | 2 |
| Lorne Ferguson | LW | 15 | 1 | 3 | 4 | 0 |
| Tom McCarthy | LW | 18 | 2 | 1 | 3 | 4 |
| Gord Hollingworth | D | 27 | 1 | 2 | 3 | 22 |
| Tony Leswick | W | 22 | 1 | 2 | 3 | 2 |
| Metro Prystai | C | 15 | 1 | 1 | 2 | 4 |
| Pete Goegan | D | 14 | 0 | 2 | 2 | 28 |
| Hec Lalande | C | 12 | 0 | 2 | 2 | 2 |
| Bill McCreary | LW | 3 | 1 | 0 | 1 | 2 |
| Cummy Burton | RW | 26 | 0 | 1 | 1 | 12 |
| Murray Oliver | C | 1 | 0 | 1 | 1 | 0 |
| Brian Smith | LW | 4 | 0 | 1 | 1 | 0 |
| Dave Amadio | D | 2 | 0 | 0 | 0 | 2 |
| Guyle Fielder | C | 6 | 0 | 0 | 0 | 2 |
| Jack Hendrickson | D | 1 | 0 | 0 | 0 | 0 |
| Brian Kilrea | C | 1 | 0 | 0 | 0 | 0 |
| Stu McNeill | C | 2 | 0 | 0 | 0 | 0 |
| Dennis Olson | C | 4 | 0 | 0 | 0 | 0 |
| Terry Sawchuk | G | 70 | 0 | 0 | 0 | 39 |
| Gord Strate | D | 45 | 0 | 0 | 0 | 24 |

Goaltending

| Player | MIN | GP | W | L | T | GA | GAA | SO |
|---|---|---|---|---|---|---|---|---|
| Terry Sawchuk | 4200 | 70 | 29 | 29 | 12 | 206 | 2.94 | 3 |
| Team: | 4200 | 70 | 29 | 29 | 12 | 206 | 2.94 | 3 |

=== Playoffs ===
Scoring

| Player | Pos | GP | G | A | Pts | PIM |
|---|---|---|---|---|---|---|
| Johnny Wilson | LW | 4 | 2 | 1 | 3 | 0 |
| Gordie Howe | RW | 4 | 1 | 1 | 2 | 0 |
| Jack McIntyre | D | 4 | 1 | 1 | 2 | 0 |
| Billy McNeill | RW | 4 | 1 | 1 | 2 | 4 |
| Norm Ullman | C | 4 | 0 | 2 | 2 | 4 |
| Forbes Kennedy | C | 4 | 1 | 0 | 1 | 12 |
| Al Arbour | D | 4 | 0 | 1 | 1 | 4 |
| Alex Delvecchio | C/LW | 4 | 0 | 1 | 1 | 0 |
| Red Kelly | D/C | 4 | 0 | 1 | 1 | 2 |
| Marcel Pronovost | D | 4 | 0 | 1 | 1 | 4 |
| Bob Bailey | RW | 4 | 0 | 0 | 0 | 16 |
| Warren Godfrey | D | 4 | 0 | 0 | 0 | 0 |
| Pete Goegan | D | 4 | 0 | 0 | 0 | 18 |
| Tony Leswick | W | 4 | 0 | 0 | 0 | 0 |
| Nick Mickoski | LW | 4 | 0 | 0 | 0 | 4 |
| Don Poile | C | 4 | 0 | 0 | 0 | 0 |
| Terry Sawchuk | G | 4 | 0 | 0 | 0 | 0 |

Goaltending

| Player | MIN | GP | W | L | GA | GAA | SO |
|---|---|---|---|---|---|---|---|
| Terry Sawchuk | 252 | 4 | 0 | 4 | 19 | 4.52 | 0 |
| Team: | 252 | 4 | 0 | 4 | 19 | 4.52 | 0 |

Note: GP = Games played; G = Goals; A = Assists; Pts = Points; +/- = Plus-minus PIM = Penalty minutes; PPG = Power-play goals; SHG = Short-handed goals; GWG = Game-winning goals;
MIN = Minutes played; W = Wins; L = Losses; T = Ties; GA = Goals against; GAA = Goals-against average; SO = Shutouts;
