= 1957–58 Chicago Black Hawks season =

NHL ice hockey team season

1957–58 Chicago Black Hawks
- League: 5th NHL
- 1957–58 record: 24–39–7
- Home record: 15–17–3
- Road record: 9–22–4
- Goals for: 163
- Goals against: 202

Team information
- General manager: Tommy Ivan
- Coach: Tommy Ivan; Rudy Pilous (1st Season)
- Captain: Vacant
- Arena: Chicago Stadium

Team leaders
- Goals: Ed Litzenberger (32)
- Assists: Bobby Hull (34)
- Points: Ed Litzenberger (62)
- Penalty minutes: Ted Lindsay (110)
- Wins: Glenn Hall (24)
- Goals against average: Glenn Hall (2.86)

The 1957–58 Chicago Black Hawks season was the team's 32nd season in the NHL, and the club was coming off their fourth consecutive last place finish in the league in 1956–57, as they had a 16–39–15 record, earning 47 points. The struggling Black Hawks had finished in last nine times in the past eleven seasons, and only one playoff appearance since 1946.

During the off-season, the Black Hawks and Detroit Red Wings made a blockbuster trade, as Chicago traded Hank Bassen, Johnny Wilson, Bill Preston, and Forbes Kennedy to the Red Wings for Glenn Hall and Ted Lindsay. Hall had won the Calder Memorial Trophy in 1956, while Lindsay was a key member of the Red Wings Stanley Cup championships in 1950, 1952, 1954, and 1955. Chicago also signed 18-year-old Bobby Hull, who had spent the past two seasons with the St. Catharines Teepees of the OHA.

Chicago got off to a good start, playing over .500 hockey thirteen games into the season, as they had a 6–5–3 record, however, the club fell into a slump, going 4–12–3 in their next 19 games, falling out of the playoff race. Tommy Ivan decided to step down from head coaching duties, as he hired former Teepees head coach Rudy Pilous to take over the team. The Hawks responded, playing .500 hockey in Pilous' first 18 games behind the bench to get back into the playoff race, however, a seven-game losing streak soon followed, and the team fell out of playoff contention for good. The Hawks finished the year 24–39–7, earning 55 points, their highest total since 1952–53, and did not finish in last place for the first time since 1953, as they had two more points than the Toronto Maple Leafs.

Offensively, Chicago was led by Ed Litzenberger, who led the club in goals with 32, while adding 30 assists for 62 points. Rookie Bobby Hull scored 13 goals and 47 points, as he finishing second to Frank Mahovlich of the Toronto Maple Leafs for the Calder Memorial Trophy. Ted Lindsay recorded 15 goals and 39 points in his first season with the team, which was a 46-point dropoff from the previous season. Lindsay also had a club high 110 penalty minutes. Pierre Pilote led the defense, scoring 6 goals and 30 points, while fellow blueliner Moose Vasko scored 6 goals and 26 points.

In goal, Glenn Hall had all the playing time, winning 24 games, while posting a 2.86 GAA, and earning 7 shutouts.

== Season standings ==
National Hockey League
		GP	W	L	T	GF	GA	DIFF	Pts
1	Montreal Canadiens	70	43	17	10	250	158	+92	96
2	New York Rangers	70	32	25	13	195	188	+7	77
3	Detroit Red Wings	70	29	29	12	176	207	−31	70
4	Boston Bruins	70	27	28	15	199	194	+5	69
5	Chicago Black Hawks	70	24	39	7	163	202	−39	55
6	Toronto Maple Leafs	70	21	38	11	192	226	−34	53

=== Record vs. opponents ===
1957–58 NHL Records
Team	BOS	CHI	DET	MTL	NYR	TOR
Boston	—	7–3–4	8–5–1	3–9–2	6–5–3	3–6–5
Chicago	3–7–4	—	7–7	3–10–1	4–9–1	7–6–1
Detroit	5–8–1	7–7	—	3–7–4	4–5–5	10–2–2
Montreal	9–3–2	10–3–1	7–3–4	—	6–6–2	11–2–1
New York	5–6–3	9–4–1	5–4–5	6–6–2	—	7–5–2
Toronto	6–3–5	6–7–1	2–10–2	2–11–1	5–7–2	—

== Schedule and results ==
1957–58 regular season
October

Game	Date	Visitor	Score	Home	Record	Points
1	October 8	Toronto Maple Leafs	0–1	Chicago Black Hawks	1–0–0	2
2	October 10	Chicago Black Hawks	1–5	Montreal Canadiens	1–1–0	2
3	October 12	Chicago Black Hawks	1–3	Boston Bruins	1–2–0	2
4	October 15	Montreal Canadiens	3–3	Chicago Black Hawks	1–2–1	3
5	October 19	Chicago Black Hawks	1–3	Montreal Canadiens	1–3–1	3
6	October 20	Chicago Black Hawks	1–6	New York Rangers	1–4–1	3
7	October 22	Boston Bruins	1–2	Chicago Black Hawks	2–4–1	5
8	October 27	Chicago Black Hawks	3–0	Detroit Red Wings	3–4–1	7
9	October 29	Detroit Red Wings	0–1	Chicago Black Hawks	4–4–1	9

November

Game	Date	Visitor	Score	Home	Record	Points
10	November 2	Chicago Black Hawks	2–2	Toronto Maple Leafs	4–4–2	10
11	November 3	New York Rangers	3–2	Chicago Black Hawks	4–5–2	10
12	November 9	New York Rangers	0–5	Chicago Black Hawks	5–5–2	12
13	November 10	Toronto Maple Leafs	1–3	Chicago Black Hawks	6–5–2	14
14	November 13	Chicago Black Hawks	2–2	New York Rangers	6–5–3	15
15	November 14	Chicago Black Hawks	2–5	Boston Bruins	6–6–3	15
16	November 16	Detroit Red Wings	1–0	Chicago Black Hawks	6–7–3	15
17	November 17	Chicago Black Hawks	3–2	Detroit Red Wings	7–7–3	17
18	November 20	Chicago Black Hawks	1–2	Toronto Maple Leafs	7–8–3	17
19	November 22	New York Rangers	4–2	Chicago Black Hawks	7–9–3	17
20	November 24	Boston Bruins	2–2	Chicago Black Hawks	7–9–4	18
21	November 28	Montreal Canadiens	2–0	Chicago Black Hawks	7–10–4	18
22	November 30	Chicago Black Hawks	1–6	Montreal Canadiens	7–11–4	18

December

Game	Date	Visitor	Score	Home	Record	Points
23	December 1	Toronto Maple Leafs	7–2	Chicago Black Hawks	7–12–4	18
24	December 4	Chicago Black Hawks	2–0	New York Rangers	8–12–4	20
25	December 7	Chicago Black Hawks	2–2	Boston Bruins	8–12–5	21
26	December 8	Boston Bruins	3–0	Chicago Black Hawks	8–13–5	21
27	December 14	Chicago Black Hawks	1–4	Toronto Maple Leafs	8–14–5	21
28	December 15	Montreal Canadiens	2–0	Chicago Black Hawks	8–15–5	21
29	December 21	Detroit Red Wings	5–3	Chicago Black Hawks	8–16–5	21
30	December 22	Chicago Black Hawks	0–2	Detroit Red Wings	8–17–5	21
31	December 25	Chicago Black Hawks	3–1	New York Rangers	9–17–5	23
32	December 28	Boston Bruins	0–0	Chicago Black Hawks	9–17–6	24
33	December 29	Toronto Maple Leafs	1–2	Chicago Black Hawks	10–17–6	26
34	December 31	Chicago Black Hawks	2–3	Detroit Red Wings	10–18–6	26

January

Game	Date	Visitor	Score	Home	Record	Points
35	January 1	Detroit Red Wings	3–4	Chicago Black Hawks	11–18–6	28
36	January 4	Chicago Black Hawks	4–2	Toronto Maple Leafs	12–18–6	30
37	January 5	Boston Bruins	3–4	Chicago Black Hawks	13–18–6	32
38	January 9	Chicago Black Hawks	3–11	Montreal Canadiens	13–19–6	32
39	January 11	Chicago Black Hawks	1–4	Detroit Red Wings	13–20–6	32
40	January 12	Montreal Canadiens	1–7	Chicago Black Hawks	14–20–6	34
41	January 16	Chicago Black Hawks	2–3	Detroit Red Wings	14–21–6	34
42	January 18	New York Rangers	3–2	Chicago Black Hawks	14–22–6	34
43	January 19	Toronto Maple Leafs	3–5	Chicago Black Hawks	15–22–6	36
44	January 23	Chicago Black Hawks	3–4	Boston Bruins	15–23–6	36
45	January 25	Chicago Black Hawks	1–2	Montreal Canadiens	15–24–6	36
46	January 26	New York Rangers	3–4	Chicago Black Hawks	16–24–6	38
47	January 29	Chicago Black Hawks	4–1	Toronto Maple Leafs	17–24–6	40

February

Game	Date	Visitor	Score	Home	Record	Points
48	February 1	Chicago Black Hawks	2–3	New York Rangers	17–25–6	40
49	February 2	Montreal Canadiens	3–1	Chicago Black Hawks	17–26–6	40
50	February 6	Chicago Black Hawks	4–1	Boston Bruins	18–26–6	42
51	February 8	Chicago Black Hawks	3–2	Montreal Canadiens	19–26–6	44
52	February 9	Detroit Red Wings	2–1	Chicago Black Hawks	19–27–6	44
53	February 14	New York Rangers	3–1	Chicago Black Hawks	19–28–6	44
54	February 16	Montreal Canadiens	0–4	Chicago Black Hawks	20–28–6	46
55	February 19	Chicago Black Hawks	2–3	New York Rangers	20–29–6	46
56	February 22	Chicago Black Hawks	1–3	Toronto Maple Leafs	20–30–6	46
57	February 23	Boston Bruins	2–0	Chicago Black Hawks	20–31–6	46
58	February 26	Chicago Black Hawks	3–4	New York Rangers	20–32–6	46

March

Game	Date	Visitor	Score	Home	Record	Points
59	March 1	Boston Bruins	3–2	Chicago Black Hawks	20–33–6	46
60	March 2	Toronto Maple Leafs	6–5	Chicago Black Hawks	20–34–6	46
61	March 5	Chicago Black Hawks	2–5	Toronto Maple Leafs	20–35–6	46
62	March 6	Chicago Black Hawks	4–4	Boston Bruins	20–35–7	47
63	March 8	Detroit Red Wings	3–4	Chicago Black Hawks	21–35–7	49
64	March 9	Montreal Canadiens	4–1	Chicago Black Hawks	21–36–7	49
65	March 12	New York Rangers	3–2	Chicago Black Hawks	21–37–7	49
66	March 15	Chicago Black Hawks	1–4	Montreal Canadiens	21–38–7	49
67	March 16	Toronto Maple Leafs	2–3	Chicago Black Hawks	22–38–7	51
68	March 20	Detroit Red Wings	4–5	Chicago Black Hawks	23–38–7	53
69	March 22	Chicago Black Hawks	6–4	Detroit Red Wings	24–38–7	55
70	March 23	Chicago Black Hawks	5–7	Boston Bruins	24–39–7	55

Legend: Win (2 points) Loss (0 points) Tie (1 point)

== Season stats ==
=== Scoring leaders ===
Player	GP	G	A	Pts	PIM
Ed Litzenberger	70	32	30	62	63
Bobby Hull	70	13	34	47	62
Ted Lindsay	67	15	24	39	110
Eric Nesterenko	70	20	18	38	104
Glen Skov	70	17	18	35	35

=== Goaltending ===
Player	GP	TOI	W	L	T	GA	SO	GAA
Glenn Hall	70	4200	24	39	7	200	7	2.86
