= Claude Evans =

Canadian ice hockey player

- Born: April 28, 1933; Longueuil, Quebec, Canada
- Died: July 7, 1982 (aged 49); Greenfield Park, Quebec, Canada
- Height: 5 ft 8 in (173 cm)
- Weight: 165 lb (75 kg; 11 st 11 lb)
- Position: Goaltender
- Shot: Left
- Played for: Montreal Canadiens; Boston Bruins
- Playing career: 1950–1962

Joseph Frederic Guy Claude Evans (April 28, 1933 — July 7, 1982) was a Canadian professional ice hockey goaltender who played five games in the National Hockey League for the Montreal Canadiens and Boston Bruins between 1954 and 1958. He was born in Longueuil, Quebec and died in Greenfield Park, Quebec.

== Career statistics ==
=== Regular season and playoffs ===
			Regular season									Playoffs
Season	Team	League	GP	W	L	T	MIN	GA	SO	GAA	SV%	GP	W	L	MIN	GA	SO	GAA	SV%
1949–50	Montreal Nationale	QJHL	1	1	0	0	60	1	0	1.00	—	—	—	—	—	—	—	—	—
1950–51	Montreal Nationale	QJHL	44	25	19	0	2670	186	0	4.18	—	3	1	2	180	14	0	4.67	—
1951–52	Montreal Nationale	QJHL	50	28	21	1	3000	198	1	3.96	—	9	4	5	544	33	0	3.64	—
1952–53	Cincinnati Mohawks	IHL	60	43	13	4	3600	152	5	2.53	—	9	8	1	540	19	1	2.11	—
1953–54	Montreal Royals	QHL	14	6	5	3	870	43	2	2.97	—	2	1	1	120	5	0	2.50	—
1953–54	Valleyfield Braves	QHL	8	3	5	0	480	31	0	3.88	—	—	—	—	—	—	—	—	—
1953–54	Providence Reds	AHL	3	0	3	0	180	14	0	4.67	—	—	—	—	—	—	—	—	—
1953–54	Victoria Cougars	WHL	14	7	6	1	840	46	0	3.28	—	5	1	4	300	28	0	5.60	—
1954–55	Montreal Canadiens	NHL	4	1	2	0	200	12	0	3.60	.875	—	—	—	—	—	—	—	—
1954–55	Quebec Aces	QHL	13	9	3	1	750	40	2	3.20	—	4	2	2	240	11	1	2.75	—
1954–55	Montreal Royals	QHL	21	10	8	3	1270	73	0	3.45	—	—	—	—	—	—	—	—	—
1954–55	Chicoutimi Sagueneens	QHL	4	2	2	0	240	15	0	3.75	—	—	—	—	—	—	—	—	—
1955–56	Quebec Aces	QHL	57	21	33	8	3410	199	2	3.50	—	—	—	—	—	—	—	—	—
1956–57	Springfield Indians	AHL	32	8	23	0	1960	143	1	4.47	—	—	—	—	—	—	—	—	—
1957–58	Boston Bruins	NHL	1	0	0	1	60	4	0	4.00	.882	—	—	—	—	—	—	—	—
1957–58	Springfield Indians	AHL	53	27	21	5	3252	173	1	3.19	—	13	6	7	783	40	3	3.07	—
1958–59	Springfield Indians	AHL	21	9	11	0	1220	84	2	4.13	—	—	—	—	—	—	—	—	—
1958–59	Trois-Rivières Lions	QHL	38	21	16	1	2280	116	3	3.05	—	8	3	5	484	26	0	3.22	—
1959–60	Trois-Rivières Lions	EPHL	62	28	25	9	3720	207	4	3.34	—	7	3	4	422	15	0	2.13	—
1960–61	Kitchener Beavers	EPHL	17	6	7	4	1020	69	0	4.06	—	—	—	—	—	—	—	—	—
1960–61	Vancouver Canucks	WHL	53	27	23	3	3180	147	6	2.77	—	9	4	5	575	24	0	2.50	—
1961–62	Vancouver Canucks	WHL	40	11	26	3	2427	165	2	4.08	—	—	—	—	—	—	—	—	—
1961–62	Pittsburgh Hornets	AHL	19	2	17	0	1140	132	0	6.95	—	—	—	—	—	—	—	—	—
1962–63	Drummondville Eagles	QSHL	—	—	—	—	—	—	—	—	—	—	—	—	—	—	—	—	—
1963–64	Drummondville Eagles	QSHL	—	—	—	—	—	—	—	—	—	—	—	—	—	—	—	—	—
1964–65	Drummondville Eagles	QSHL	—	—	—	—	—	—	—	—	—	—	—	—	—	—	—	—	—
1965–66	Victoriaville Tigres	QSHL	3	—	—	—	180	20	0	6.67	—	—	—	—	—	—	—	—	—
1965–66	Trois-Rivieres Leafs	QIHL	24	10	12	2	1140	128	0	5.33	—	—	—	—	—	—	—	—	—
NHL totals			5	1	2	1	260	16	0	3.69	.878	—	—	—	—	—	—	—	—
