= 1957–58 New York Rangers season =

NHL hockey team season

1957–58 New York Rangers
- League: 2nd NHL
- 1957–58 record: 32–25–13
- Home record: 14–15–6
- Road record: 18–10–7
- Goals for: 195
- Goals against: 188

Team information
- General manager: Muzz Patrick
- Coach: Phil Watson
- Captain: George Sullivan
- Arena: Madison Square Garden

Team leaders
- Goals: Camille Henry (32)
- Assists: Andy Bathgate (48)
- Points: Andy Bathgate (78)
- Penalty minutes: Lou Fontinato (152)
- Wins: Gump Worsley (21)
- Goals against average: Gump Worsley (2.32)

The 1957–58 New York Rangers season was the franchise's 32nd season. The Rangers finished the regular season with 77 points, a total that placed them second in the NHL. New York qualified for the Stanley Cup playoffs, but lost to the Boston Bruins in the semi-finals.

== Regular season ==
=== Final standings ===
National Hockey League
		GP	W	L	T	GF	GA	DIFF	Pts
1	Montreal Canadiens	70	43	17	10	250	158	+92	96
2	New York Rangers	70	32	25	13	195	188	+7	77
3	Detroit Red Wings	70	29	29	12	176	207	−31	70
4	Boston Bruins	70	27	28	15	199	194	+5	69
5	Chicago Black Hawks	70	24	39	7	163	202	−39	55
6	Toronto Maple Leafs	70	21	38	11	192	226	−34	53

=== Record vs. opponents ===
1957–58 NHL Records
Team	BOS	CHI	DET	MTL	NYR	TOR
Boston	—	7–3–4	8–5–1	3–9–2	6–5–3	3–6–5
Chicago	3–7–4	—	7–7	3–10–1	4–9–1	7–6–1
Detroit	5–8–1	7–7	—	3–7–4	4–5–5	10–2–2
Montreal	9–3–2	10–3–1	7–3–4	—	6–6–2	11–2–1
New York	5–6–3	9–4–1	5–4–5	6–6–2	—	7–5–2
Toronto	6–3–5	6–7–1	2–10–2	2–11–1	5–7–2	—

== Schedule and results ==
1957–58 regular season
October: 5–4–1 (home: 3–2–0; road: 2–2–1)

Game	October	Opponent	Score	Record
1	10	@ Detroit Red Wings	3–2	1–0–0
2	12	@ Montreal Canadiens	2–2	1–0–1
3	13	@ Boston Bruins	3–1	1–1–1
4	16	Boston Bruins	6–2	1–2–1
5	20	Chicago Black Hawks	6–1	2–2–1
6	23	Toronto Maple Leafs	3–0	3–2–1
7	26	@ Toronto Maple Leafs	3–0	3–3–1
8	27	Montreal Canadiens	4–1	4–3–1
9	30	Detroit Red Wings	4–0	4–4–1
10	31	@ Boston Bruins	3–0	5–4–1

November: 6–5–3 (home: 2–3–2; road: 4–2–1)

Game	November	Opponent	Score	Record
11	2	Boston Bruins	5–0	6–4–1
12	3	@ Chicago Black Hawks	3–2	7–4–1
13	5	@ Detroit Red Wings	1–1	7–4–2
14	6	@ Toronto Maple Leafs	4–2	8–4–2
15	9	@ Chicago Black Hawks	5–0	8–5–2
16	13	Chicago Black Hawks	2–2	8–5–3
17	16	@ Montreal Canadiens	4–2	9–5–3
18	17	Montreal Canadiens	4–2	10–5–3
19	20	Detroit Red Wings	1–1	10–5–4
20	22	@ Chicago Black Hawks	4–2	11–5–4
21	24	Toronto Maple Leafs	5–1	11–6–4
22	27	Boston Bruins	5–2	11–7–4
23	28	@ Boston Bruins	1–0	11–8–4
24	30	Detroit Red Wings	3–1	11–9–4

December: 5–6–3 (home: 3–4–0; road: 2–2–3)

Game	December	Opponent	Score	Record
25	1	@ Detroit Red Wings	5–1	12–9–4
26	4	Chicago Black Hawks	2–0	12–10–4
27	7	@ Toronto Maple Leafs	3–3	12–10–5
28	8	Toronto Maple Leafs	2–1	12–11–5
29	12	@ Montreal Canadiens	3–2	12–12–5
30	14	@ Detroit Red Wings	4–4	12–12–6
31	15	Detroit Red Wings	4–2	13–12–6
32	18	Montreal Canadiens	5–4	14–12–6
33	19	@ Boston Bruins	3–3	14–12–7
34	21	@ Montreal Canadiens	4–2	15–12–7
35	22	Toronto Maple Leafs	5–2	16–12–7
36	25	Chicago Black Hawks	3–1	16–13–7
37	28	@ Toronto Maple Leafs	6–1	16–14–7
38	29	Montreal Canadiens	4–3	16–15–7

January: 3–6–2 (home: 0–3–2; road: 3–3–0)

Game	January	Opponent	Score	Record
39	4	Boston Bruins	7–4	16–16–7
40	5	Montreal Canadiens	4–0	16–17–7
41	8	Toronto Maple Leafs	5–5	16–17–8
42	11	@ Montreal Canadiens	9–3	16–18–8
43	12	Detroit Red Wings	3–2	16–19–8
44	16	@ Boston Bruins	3–2	17–19–8
45	18	@ Chicago Black Hawks	3–2	18–19–8
46	19	@ Detroit Red Wings	6–1	19–19–8
47	25	@ Toronto Maple Leafs	7–1	19–20–8
48	26	@ Chicago Black Hawks	4–3	19–21–8
49	29	Boston Bruins	1–1	19–21–9

February: 7–2–1 (home: 5–1–0; road: 2–1–1)

Game	February	Opponent	Score	Record
50	1	Chicago Black Hawks	3–2	20–21–9
51	2	@ Boston Bruins	4–3	20–22–9
52	8	@ Detroit Red Wings	5–2	21–22–9
53	9	Montreal Canadiens	3–1	21–23–9
54	14	@ Chicago Black Hawks	3–1	22–23–9
55	16	Boston Bruins	3–2	23–23–9
56	19	Chicago Black Hawks	3–2	24–23–9
57	22	@ Montreal Canadiens	2–2	24–23–10
58	23	Toronto Maple Leafs	4–2	25–23–10
59	26	Chicago Black Hawks	4–3	26–23–10

March: 6–2–3 (home: 1–2–2; road: 5–0–1)

Game	March	Opponent	Score	Record
60	1	@ Toronto Maple Leafs	5–4	27–23–10
61	2	Detroit Red Wings	4–4	27–23–11
62	8	@ Montreal Canadiens	3–2	28–23–11
63	9	Detroit Red Wings	4–2	28–24–11
64	11	@ Detroit Red Wings	2–2	28–24–12
65	12	@ Chicago Black Hawks	3–2	29–24–12
66	15	@ Boston Bruins	4–0	30–24–12
67	16	Montreal Canadiens	3–2	30–25–12
68	19	Boston Bruins	1–1	30–25–13
69	22	@ Toronto Maple Leafs	7–0	31–25–13
70	23	Toronto Maple Leafs	3–2	32–25–13

Legend: Win (2 points) Loss (0 points) Tie (1 point)

== Playoffs ==
1958 Stanley Cup playoffs
Semifinals vs. (4) Boston Bruins – Boston wins 4–2

Game	Date	Visitor	Score	Home	OT	Series
1	March 25	Boston Bruins	3–5	New York Rangers		New York Rangers lead series 1–0
2	March 27	Boston Bruins	4–3	New York Rangers	OT	Series tied 1–1
3	March 29	New York Rangers	0–5	Boston Bruins		Boston leads series 2–1
4	April 1	New York Rangers	5–2	Boston Bruins		Series tied 2–2
5	April 3	New York Rangers	1–6	Boston Bruins		Boston leads series 3–2
6	April 5	New York Rangers	2–8	Boston Bruins		Boston wins series 4–2

Legend: Win Loss

== Player statistics ==
Skaters

Regular season
Player	GP	G	A	Pts	PIM
Andy Bathgate	65	30	48	78	42
Camille Henry	70	32	24	56	2
Dave Creighton	70	17	35	52	40
Bill Gadsby	65	14	32	46	48
George Sullivan	70	11	35	46	61
Andy Hebenton	70	21	24	45	17
Larry Popein	70	12	22	34	22
Danny Lewicki	70	11	19	30	26
Jean-Guy Gendron	70	10	17	27	68
Dean Prentice	38	13	9	22	14
Parker MacDonald	70	8	10	18	30
Jack Evans	70	4	8	12	108
Harry Howell	70	4	7	11	62
Lou Fontinato	70	3	8	11	152
Hank Ciesla	60	2	6	8	16
Gerry Foley	68	2	5	7	43
Larry Cahan	34	1	1	2	20
Ivan Irwin	1	0	0	0	0

Playoffs
Player	GP	G	A	Pts	PIM
Andy Bathgate	6	5	3	8	6
Dave Creighton	6	3	3	6	2
Andy Hebenton	6	2	3	5	4
Camille Henry	6	1	4	5	5
Dean Prentice	6	1	3	4	4
Parker MacDonald	6	1	2	3	2
Bill Gadsby	6	0	3	3	4
Hank Ciesla	6	0	2	2	0
Gerry Foley	6	0	1	1	2
Lou Fontinato	6	0	1	1	6
Harry Howell	6	1	0	1	8
Jean-Guy Gendron	6	1	0	1	11
Larry Popein	6	1	0	1	4
Larry Cahan	5	0	0	0	4
Jack Evans	6	0	0	0	17
Danny Lewicki	6	0	0	0	6
George Sullivan	1	0	0	0	0

Goaltenders

Regular season
Player	GP	TOI	W	L	T	GA	GAA	SA	SV%	SO
Lorne Worsley	37	2220	21	10	6	86	2.32	1193	.928	4
Marcel Paille	33	1980	11	15	7	102	3.09	1118	.909	1

Playoffs
Player	GP	TOI	W	L	GA	GAA	SO
Lorne Worsley	6	365	2	4	28	4.60	0

^{†}Denotes player spent time with another team before joining Rangers. Stats reflect time with Rangers only.
^{‡}Traded mid-season. Stats reflect time with Rangers only.

Note:

Pos = Position;GP = Games played; G = Goals; A = Assists; Pts = Points; PIM = Penalty minutes; +/- = Plus/minus; PPG = Power-play goals; SHG = Short-handed goals; GWG = Game-winning goals
Pos = Position;GP = Games played; Min, TOI = Minutes played; W = Wins; L = Losses; T,T/OT = Ties; OTL = Overtime losses; GA = Goals-against; GAA = Goals-against average; SO = Shutouts; SA = Shots against; SV = Shots saved;SV% = Save percentage;

== See also ==
- 1957–58 NHL season
