= John Aiken (ice hockey) =

American ice hockey player (1932–2021)

- Born: January 1, 1932 Arlington, Massachusetts, U.S.
- Died: November 2, 2021 (aged 89) Reading, Massachusetts, U.S.
- Height: 5 ft 11 in (180 cm)
- Weight: 165 lb (75 kg; 11 st 11 lb)
- Position: Goaltender
- Caught: Left
- Played for: Montreal Canadiens
- Playing career: 1957–1958

John Judson Aiken (January 1, 1932 – November 2, 2021) was an American ice hockey goaltender. He played one game for the Montreal Canadiens in the National Hockey League during the 1957–1958 season.

Aiken was spectating at the Canadiens versus Boston Bruins match on March 13, 1958, when Canadiens goaltender Jacques Plante was seriously injured during the second period. Aiken, who was the Bruins' practice goaltender, was called out of the crowd to take Plante's place. Aiken made twelve saves and allowed six goals in a 7–3 Boston victory.

== Career statistics ==
=== Regular season and playoffs ===
| | | | Regular season | | | | | | | | | Playoffs |
| Season | Team | League | GP | W | L | T | MIN | GA | SO | GAA | SV% | GP | W | L | MIN | GA | SO | GAA | SV% |
|---|---|---|---|---|---|---|---|---|---|---|---|---|---|---|---|---|---|---|---|
| 1949–50 | Arlington Catholic High School | HS-MA | — | — | — | — | — | — | — | — | — | — | — | — | — | — | — | — | — |
| 1950–51 | Boston Calculators | MBAHL | — | — | — | — | — | — | — | — | — | — | — | — | — | — | — | — | — |
| 1951–52 | Boston Calculators | MBAHL | — | — | — | — | — | — | — | — | — | — | — | — | — | — | — | — | — |
| 1952–53 | Boston University | NCAA | — | — | — | — | — | — | — | — | — | — | — | — | — | — | — | — | — |
| 1953–54 | Boston University | NCAA | — | — | — | — | — | — | — | — | — | — | — | — | — | — | — | — | — |
| 1954–55 | Boston University | NCAA | 23 | 4 | 19 | 0 | 1380 | 163 | 0 | 7.09 | — | — | — | — | — | — | — | — | — |
| 1955–56 | Boston Calculators | MBAHL | — | — | — | — | — | — | — | — | — | — | — | — | — | — | — | — | — |
| 1956–57 | Boston Calculators | MBAHL | — | — | — | — | — | — | — | — | — | — | — | — | — | — | — | — | — |
| 1957–58 | Montreal Canadiens | NHL | 1 | 0 | 1 | 0 | 34 | 6 | 0 | 10.67 | .667 | — | — | — | — | — | — | — | — |
| NHL totals | | | 1 | 0 | 1 | 0 | 34 | 6 | 0 | 10.67 | .667 | — | — | — | — | — | — | — | — |

== See also ==
- List of players who played only one game in the NHL
