= Len Broderick =

Canadian ice hockey player (born 1938)

- Born: October 11, 1938 (age 87) Toronto, Ontario, Canada
- Height: 5 ft 11 in (180 cm)
- Weight: 175 lb (79 kg; 12 st 7 lb)
- Position: Goaltender
- Caught: Left
- Played for: Montreal Canadiens
- Playing career: 1957–1961

Leonard Francis Broderick (born October 11, 1938) is a Canadian former ice hockey goaltender. He played one game in the National Hockey League, with the Montreal Canadiens during the 1957–58 season. He is the brother of former professional hockey player Ken Broderick.

Born in Toronto, Ontario, Broderick played junior hockey with the Toronto Marlboros, with whom he recorded record-tying nine shutouts in the 1956-57 season, tying a record previously set by Glenn Hall. During the 1957–58 season, he was loaned to the Montreal Canadiens by the Marlboros to replace Jacques Plante, and played his one and only National Hockey League in a 6-2 win over his hometown Toronto Maple Leafs on October 30, 1957. He spent one more season with the Marlboros before playing senior hockey with the Oakville Oaks. He signed with the St. Paul Saints, but let in 16 goals in 3 games and retired soon after.

== Career statistics ==
=== Regular season and playoffs ===
			Regular season									Playoffs
Season	Team	League	GP	W	L	T	MIN	GA	SO	GAA	SV%	GP	W	L	T	MIN	GA	SO	GAA	SV%
1955–56	Toronto Marlboros	OHA	5	4	1	0	300	8	1	1.60	—	11	8	2	1	660	26	1	2.36	—
1956–57	Toronto Marlboros	OHA	42	28	11	3	2520	104	8	2.48	—	9	5	4	0	540	27	1	3.00	—
1956–57	Toronto Marlboros	M-Cup	—	—	—	—	—	—	—	—	—	11	8	1	2	670	20	4	1.79	—
1957–58	Montreal Canadiens	NHL	1	1	0	0	60	2	0	2.00	.909	—	—	—	—	—	—	—	—	—
1957–58	Toronto Marlboros	OHA	40	16	15	9	2400	131	1	3.28	—	18	9	7	2	1062	62	0	3.50	—
1957–58	Toronto Marlboros	M-Cup	—	—	—	—	—	—	—	—	—	5	1	4	0	282	23	0	4.89	—
1958–59	Toronto Marlboros	OHA	23	—	—	—	1380	72	1	3.13	—	5	1	4	0	300	24	0	4.80	—
1959–60	St. Paul Saints	IHL	3	—	—	—	—	—	—	5.33	—	—	—	—	—	—	—	—	—	—
NHL totals			1	1	0	0	60	2	0	2.00	.909	—	—	—	—	—	—	—	—	—

== See also ==
- List of players who played only one game in the NHL
