= 1957–58 Toronto Maple Leafs season =

NHL hockey team season

1957–58 Toronto Maple Leafs
- League: 6th NHL
- 1957–58 record: 21–38–11
- Home record: 12–16–7
- Road record: 9–22–4
- Goals for: 192
- Goals against: 226

Team information
- General manager: Stafford Smythe interim
- Coach: Billy Reay
- Captain: Vacant
- Arena: Maple Leaf Gardens

Team leaders
- Goals: Dick Duff (26)
- Assists: Billy Harris (28)
- Points: Dick Duff
- Penalty minutes: George Armstrong (93)
- Wins: Ed Chadwick (21)
- Goals against average: Ed Chadwick (3.19)

The 1957–58 Toronto Maple Leafs season was Toronto's 41st season in the National Hockey League (NHL). The team missed the playoffs for the second year in a row, for the first time since the 1926–27 and 1927–28 seasons.

== Regular season ==
=== Final standings ===
National Hockey League
		GP	W	L	T	GF	GA	DIFF	Pts
1	Montreal Canadiens	70	43	17	10	250	158	+92	96
2	New York Rangers	70	32	25	13	195	188	+7	77
3	Detroit Red Wings	70	29	29	12	176	207	−31	70
4	Boston Bruins	70	27	28	15	199	194	+5	69
5	Chicago Black Hawks	70	24	39	7	163	202	−39	55
6	Toronto Maple Leafs	70	21	38	11	192	226	−34	53

=== Record vs. opponents ===
1957–58 NHL Records
Team	BOS	CHI	DET	MTL	NYR	TOR
Boston	—	7–3–4	8–5–1	3–9–2	6–5–3	3–6–5
Chicago	3–7–4	—	7–7	3–10–1	4–9–1	7–6–1
Detroit	5–8–1	7–7	—	3–7–4	4–5–5	10–2–2
Montreal	9–3–2	10–3–1	7–3–4	—	6–6–2	11–2–1
New York	5–6–3	9–4–1	5–4–5	6–6–2	—	7–5–2
Toronto	6–3–5	6–7–1	2–10–2	2–11–1	5–7–2	—

== Schedule and results ==
1957–58 regular season
October

Game	Result	Date	Score	Opponent	Record
1	L	October 8, 1957	0–1	@ Chicago Black Hawks (1957–58)	0–1–0
2	L	October 12, 1957	3–5	Detroit Red Wings (1957–58)	0–2–0
3	L	October 17, 1957	3–9	@ Montreal Canadiens (1957–58)	0–3–0
4	W	October 19, 1957	7–0	Boston Bruins (1957–58)	1–3–0
5	L	October 20, 1957	1–3	@ Detroit Red Wings (1957–58)	1–4–0
6	L	October 23, 1957	0–3	@ New York Rangers (1957–58)	1–5–0
7	W	October 26, 1957	3–0	New York Rangers (1957–58)	2–5–0
8	L	October 30, 1957	2–6	Montreal Canadiens (1957–58)	2–6–0
9	W	October 31, 1957	3–1	@ Montreal Canadiens (1957–58)	3–6–0

November

Game	Result	Date	Score	Opponent	Record
10	T	November 2, 1957	3–3	Chicago Black Hawks (1957–58)	3–6–1
11	L	November 6, 1957	2–4	New York Rangers (1957–58)	3–7–1
12	W	November 7, 1957	5–3	@ Boston Bruins (1957–58)	4–7–1
13	T	November 9, 1957	3–3	Detroit Red Wings (1957–58)	4–7–2
14	L	November 10, 1957	1–3	@ Chicago Black Hawks (1957–58)	4–8–2
15	L	November 13, 1957	2–4	Montreal Canadiens (1957–58)	4–9–2
16	L	November 16, 1957	2–4	Boston Bruins (1957–58)	4–10–2
17	T	November 17, 1957	2–2	@ Boston Bruins (1957–58)	4–10–3
18	W	November 20, 1957	2–1	Chicago Black Hawks (1957–58)	5–10–3
19	L	November 23, 1957	1–2	Detroit Red Wings (1957–58)	5–11–3
20	W	November 24, 1957	5–1	@ New York Rangers (1957–58)	6–11–3
21	T	November 28, 1957	3–3	@ Detroit Red Wings (1957–58)	6–11–4
22	W	November 30, 1957	3–2	Boston Bruins (1957–58)	7–11–4

December

Game	Result	Date	Score	Opponent	Record
23	W	December 1, 1957	7–2	@ Chicago Black Hawks (1957–58)	8–11–4
24	T	December 4, 1957	0–0	Montreal Canadiens (1957–58)	8–11–5
25	L	December 5, 1957	3–4	@ Montreal Canadiens (1957–58)	8–12–5
26	T	December 7, 1957	3–3	New York Rangers (1957–58)	8–12–6
27	W	December 8, 1957	2–1	@ New York Rangers (1957–58)	9–12–6
28	W	December 14, 1957	4–1	Chicago Black Hawks (1957–58)	10–12–6
29	W	December 15, 1957	3–1	@ Boston Bruins (1957–58)	11–12–6
30	L	December 19, 1957	2–3	@ Detroit Red Wings (1957–58)	11–13–6
31	T	December 21, 1957	3–3	Boston Bruins (1957–58)	11–13–7
32	L	December 22, 1957	2–5	@ New York Rangers (1957–58)	11–14–7
33	W	December 25, 1957	5–4	Montreal Canadiens (1957–58)	12–14–7
34	W	December 28, 1957	6–1	New York Rangers (1957–58)	13–14–7
35	L	December 29, 1957	1–2	@ Chicago Black Hawks (1957–58)	13–15–7

January

Game	Result	Date	Score	Opponent	Record
36	L	January 2, 1958	2–5	@ Montreal Canadiens (1957–58)	13–16–7
37	L	January 4, 1958	2–4	Chicago Black Hawks (1957–58)	13–17–7
38	L	January 5, 1958	2–3	@ Detroit Red Wings (1957–58)	13–18–7
39	T	January 8, 1958	5–5	@ New York Rangers (1957–58)	13–18–8
40	T	January 11, 1958	2–2	Boston Bruins (1957–58)	13–18–9
41	W	January 12, 1958	5–3	@ Boston Bruins (1957–58)	14–18–9
42	L	January 16, 1958	2–5	@ Montreal Canadiens (1957–58)	14–19–9
43	W	January 18, 1958	2–1	Detroit Red Wings (1957–58)	15–19–9
44	L	January 19, 1958	3–5	@ Chicago Black Hawks (1957–58)	15–20–9
45	L	January 22, 1958	0–2	Montreal Canadiens (1957–58)	15–21–9
46	W	January 25, 1958	7–1	New York Rangers (1957–58)	16–21–9
47	T	January 26, 1958	3–3	@ Boston Bruins (1957–58)	16–21–10
48	L	January 29, 1958	1–4	Chicago Black Hawks (1957–58)	16–22–10

February

Game	Result	Date	Score	Opponent	Record
49	W	February 1, 1958	9–2	Detroit Red Wings (1957–58)	17–22–10
50	L	February 2, 1958	1–3	@ Detroit Red Wings (1957–58)	17–23–10
51	L	February 8, 1958	3–7	Boston Bruins (1957–58)	17–24–10
52	W	February 9, 1958	2–0	@ Boston Bruins (1957–58)	18–24–10
53	L	February 12, 1958	2–5	Montreal Canadiens (1957–58)	18–25–10
54	L	February 15, 1958	3–6	Detroit Red Wings (1957–58)	18–26–10
55	L	February 16, 1958	1–4	@ Detroit Red Wings (1957–58)	18–27–10
56	W	February 22, 1958	3–1	Chicago Black Hawks (1957–58)	19–27–10
57	L	February 23, 1958	2–4	@ New York Rangers (1957–58)	19–28–10
58	L	February 27, 1958	1–4	@ Montreal Canadiens (1957–58)	19–29–10

March

Game	Result	Date	Score	Opponent	Record
59	L	March 1, 1958	4–5	New York Rangers (1957–58)	19–30–10
60	W	March 2, 1958	6–5	@ Chicago Black Hawks (1957–58)	20–30–10
61	W	March 5, 1958	5–2	Chicago Black Hawks (1957–58)	21–30–10
62	T	March 8, 1958	3–3	Boston Bruins (1957–58)	21–30–11
63	L	March 9, 1958	0–7	@ Boston Bruins (1957–58)	21–31–11
64	L	March 12, 1958	3–5	Montreal Canadiens (1957–58)	21–32–11
65	L	March 15, 1958	1–3	Detroit Red Wings (1957–58)	21–33–11
66	L	March 16, 1958	2–3	@ Chicago Black Hawks (1957–58)	21–34–11
67	L	March 18, 1958	2–4	@ Detroit Red Wings (1957–58)	21–35–11
68	L	March 20, 1958	4–7	@ Montreal Canadiens (1957–58)	21–36–11
69	L	March 22, 1958	0–7	New York Rangers (1957–58)	21–37–11
70	L	March 23, 1958	2–3	@ New York Rangers (1957–58)	21–38–11

Legend: Win (2 points) Loss (0 points) Tie (1 point)

== Player statistics ==
=== Regular season ===
Scoring

Player	GP	G	A	Pts	PIM
Dick Duff	65	26	23	49	79
Billy Harris	68	16	28	44	32
Brian Cullen	67	20	23	43	29
George Armstrong	59	17	25	42	93
Barry Cullen	70	16	25	41	37
Ron Stewart	70	15	24	39	51
Tod Sloan	59	13	25	38	58
Frank Mahovlich	67	20	16	36	67
Bob Pulford	70	14	17	31	48
Tim Horton	53	6	20	26	39
Gary Aldcorn	59	10	14	24	12
Jim Morrison	70	3	21	24	62
Rudy Migay	48	7	14	21	18
Paul Masnick	41	2	9	11	14
Bob Baun	67	1	9	10	91
Marc Reaume	68	1	7	8	49
Gerry James	15	3	2	5	61
Sid Smith	12	2	1	3	2
Pete Conacher	5	0	1	1	5
Earl Balfour	1	0	0	0	0
Carl Brewer	2	0	0	0	0
Ed Chadwick	70	0	0	0	0
Ken Girard	3	0	0	0	0
Al MacNeil	13	0	0	0	9
Bob Nevin	4	0	0	0	0
Noel Price	1	0	0	0	5

Goaltending

Player	MIN	GP	W	L	T	GA	GAA	SA	SV	SV%	SO
Ed Chadwick	4200	70	21	38	11	223	3.19				4
Team:	4200	70	21	38	11	223	3.19				4

== See also ==
- 1957–58 NHL season
