= Connie Broden =

Canadian ice hockey player (1932–2013)

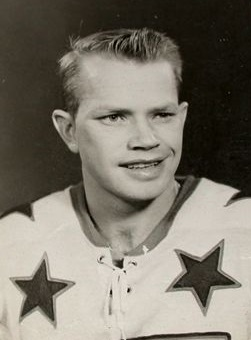
- Born: April 6, 1932 Montreal, Quebec, Canada
- Died: November 23, 2013 (aged 81) Toronto, Ontario, Canada
- Height: 5 ft 8 in (173 cm)
- Weight: 160 lb (73 kg; 11 st 6 lb)
- Position: Centre
- Shot: Left
- Played for: Montreal Canadiens
- National team: Canada
- Playing career: 1950–1959

Medal record

Representing Canada

World Championships
Gold medal – first place	1958 Oslo	

Thomas Connell Broden (April 6, 1932 – November 23, 2013) was a Canadian ice hockey forward. Broden is the only player to have won the International Ice Hockey Federation's World Championships and the Stanley Cup in the same year (1958).

== Playing career ==
Broden played his entire National Hockey League career with the Montreal Canadiens; it consisted of six regular-season games and seven playoff games. Overall, he scored two goals and recorded one assist in NHL play. He made his NHL debut in 1956 and retired following the 1958 season. He won two Stanley Cups with Montreal in 1957 and 1958.

Playing for Canada's Whitby Dunlops, Broden won the IIHF's Oslo tournament in scoring with 12 goals and 7 assists in 7 games, scoring at least one goal in every game of the World Championship. Canada beat the Soviet Union national ice hockey team 4 – 2 to take the gold in the championship.

== Post-playing career ==
After retiring from hockey Broden worked as a senior executive at Molson Breweries for 32 years. He died on November 23, 2013, at a Toronto hospital.

== Career statistics ==
=== Regular season and playoffs ===
			Regular season					Playoffs
Season	Team	League	GP	G	A	Pts	PIM	GP	G	A	Pts	PIM
1949–50	Montreal Royals	QSHL	36	7	19	26	14	3	0	1	1	0
1950–51	Montreal Royals	QSHL	29	15	12	27	15	—	—	—	—	—
1950–51	Montreal Junior Royals	QJHL	1	0	0	0	0	—	—	—	—	—
1951–52	Montreal Junior Canadiens	QJHL	39	16	24	40	18	10	5	2	7	8
1952–53	Cincinnati Mohawks	IHL	57	29	38	67	39	9	4	3	7	8
1953–54	Cincinnati Mohawks	IHL	59	32	37	69	34	11	3	2	5	14
1954–55	Shawinigan Falls Cataractes	QSHL	62	27	35	62	25	13	5	7	12	15
1955–56	Montreal Canadiens	NHL	3	0	0	0	2	—	—	—	—	—
1955–56	Shawinigan Falls Cataractes	QSHL	61	17	40	57	45	11	2	8	10	8
1956–57	Montreal Canadiens	NHL	—	—	—	—	—	6	0	1	1	0
1956–57	Shawinigan Falls Cataracts	QSHL	68	20	29	49	32	—	—	—	—	—
1957–58	Montreal Canadiens	NHL	3	2	1	3	0	1	0	0	0	0
1957–58	Whitby Dunlops	OHA Sr	7	5	9	14	0	—	—	—	—	—
1958–59	Hull-Ottawa Canadiens	OHA Sr	26	11	12	23	40	7	0	4	4	20
QSHL totals			256	86	135	121	131	27	7	16	23	23
NHL totals			6	2	1	3	2	7	0	1	1	0

=== International ===
Year	Team	Event	GP	G	A	Pts	PIM
1958	Canada	WC	7	11	7	18	6
Senior totals			7	11	7	18	6
