= Buddy Boone =

Canadian ice hockey player (1932–1986)

- Born: September 11, 1932 Kirkland Lake, Ontario, Canada
- Died: September 1, 1986 (aged 53) Kirkland Lake, Ontario, Canada
- Height: 5 ft 7 in (170 cm)
- Weight: 158 lb (72 kg; 11 st 4 lb)
- Position: Right wing
- Shot: Right
- Played for: Boston Bruins
- Playing career: 1952–1970

Carl George "Buddy" Boone (September 11, 1932 — September 1, 1986) was a Canadian professional ice hockey right winger who played 34 regular season and 22 playoff games in the National Hockey League for the Boston Bruins between 1957 and 1958. Boone played most of his career, which lasted from 1952 to 1970, in the various professional ice hockey leagues of North America.

== Career statistics ==
=== Regular season and playoffs ===
			Regular season					Playoffs
Season	Team	League	GP	G	A	Pts	PIM	GP	G	A	Pts	PIM
1949–50	St. Catharines Teepees	OHA	45	13	17	30	75	5	4	1	5	10
1950–51	St. Catharines Teepees	OHA	53	28	27	55	94	9	7	4	11	8
1951–52	St. Catharines Teepees	OHA	45	43	23	66	38	14	8	4	12	4
1952–53	St. Louis Flyers	AHL	64	13	26	39	20	—	—	—	—	—
1953–54	Edmonton Flyers	WHL	28	3	5	8	22	—	—	—	—	—
1953–54	Quebec Aces	QSHL	35	6	14	20	57	16	8	8	16	18
1954–55	Springfield Indians	AHL	63	30	31	61	38	4	2	0	2	0
1955–56	Springfield Indians	AHL	31	11	12	23	24	—	—	—	—	—
1956–57	Springfield Indians	AHL	57	24	22	46	45	—	—	—	—	—
1956–57	Boston Bruins	NHL	—	—	—	—	—	10	1	0	1	12
1957–58	Boston Bruins	NHL	34	5	3	8	28	12	1	1	2	13
1957–58	Springfield Indians	AHL	33	13	16	29	34	—	—	—	—	—
1958–59	Quebec Aces	QHL	20	5	6	11	14	—	—	—	—	—
1958–59	Providence Reds	AHL	28	7	10	17	16	—	—	—	—	—
1959–60	Kingston Frontenacs	EPHL	69	25	29	54	33	—	—	—	—	—
1960–61	Kingston Frontenacs	EPHL	51	24	23	47	26	—	—	—	—	—
1960–61	Winnipeg Warriors	WHL	13	7	7	14	10	—	—	—	—	—
1961–62	San Francisco Seals	WHL	62	30	27	57	22	2	0	0	0	0
1962–63	Vancouver Canucks	WHL	69	44	36	80	24	7	3	0	3	4
1963–64	Vancouver Canucks	WHL	66	38	25	63	18	—	—	—	—	—
1964–65	Vancouver Canucks	WHL	54	22	24	46	29	5	2	0	2	2
1965–66	Los Angeles Blades	WHL	58	17	19	36	6	—	—	—	—	—
1966–67	Los Angeles Blades	WHL	45	14	13	27	16	—	—	—	—	—
1968–69	Des Moines Oak Leafs	IHL	59	20	22	42	20	—	—	—	—	—
1969–70	Des Moines Oak Leafs	IHL	8	1	1	2	2	—	—	—	—	—
AHL totals			276	98	117	215	177	4	2	0	2	0
WHL totals			395	175	156	331	147	14	5	0	5	6
NHL totals			34	5	3	8	28	22	2	1	3	25

== Awards and achievements ==
- WHL First All-Star Team (1963)
- WHL Second All-Star Team (1964)
