= Bronco Horvath =

Canadian ice hockey player (1930–2019)

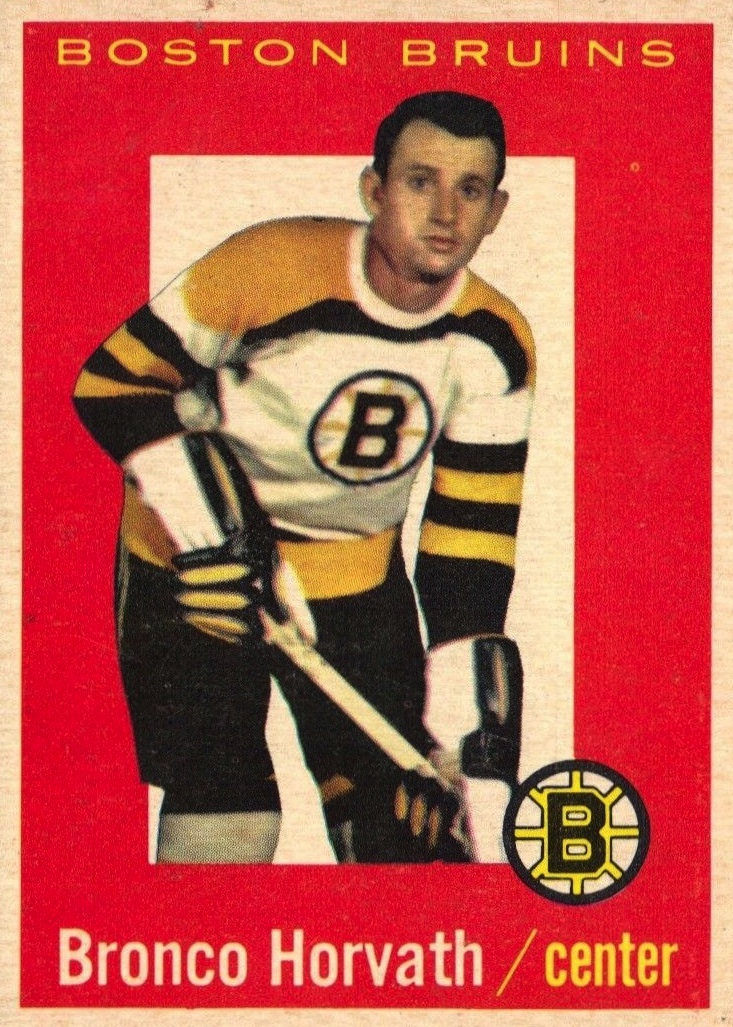
- Born: March 12, 1930 Port Colborne, Ontario, Canada
- Died: December 17, 2019 (aged 89) Hyannis, Massachusetts, U.S.
- Height: 5 ft 11 in (180 cm)
- Weight: 185 lb (84 kg; 13 st 3 lb)
- Position: Centre
- Shot: Left
- Played for: New York Rangers; Montreal Canadiens; Boston Bruins; Chicago Black Hawks; Toronto Maple Leafs; Minnesota North Stars
- Playing career: 1949–1970

Bronco Joseph Horvath (March 12, 1930 – December 17, 2019) was a Canadian professional ice hockey player who played 434 games in the National Hockey League (NHL) between 1955 and 1968.

== Early life ==
Horvath was born to an ethnic Hungarian family that emigrated from Transcarpathia after the end of World War I, when it became part of Czechoslovakia.

He was also a standout baseball player growing up which led to him getting a tryout with the Brooklyn Dodgers.

== Career ==
Horvath was signed by the Detroit Red Wings as an amateur. On August 18, 1955, the Red Wings traded Horvath and Dave Creighton to the New York Rangers in exchange for Aggie Kukulowicz and Billy Dea. In 1954-55 Horvath played for the Edmonton Flyers of the WHL, that year he led the lead in scoring with 110 points in 67 games, Helping the team win the league championship. He was voted a First Team AHL All-Star during the 1956-57 after leading the Rochester Americans with 81 points in just 56 games played.

Horvath is perhaps best remembered for his time playing on the famous "Uke Line" with the Boston Bruins, with Ukrainian-Canadians Johnny Bucyk and Vic Stasiuk. Horvath missed out on the Art Ross Trophy in 1959–60 by a single point to Bobby Hull, however he tied with Hull for the goal-scoring lead, with 39. That year he was named a to the Second All-Star team and played in that years all star game. He made the All Star game again the following year in 1960-61. He played for five of the Original Six teams in the NHL (only missing Detroit), He did apprentice with the Edmonton Flyers, Detroit's WHL farm team, along with John Bucyk and Vic Stasiuk, his future Uke Linemates. He was demoted to the minors in 1963. Bucyk described Horvath stating "Bronco was the centerman for myself and Vic, the goal-scorer, and he could really shoot that puck," "He'd position himself and he had a quick release that would surprise a lot of goaltenders.” “Bronco was a character, too," "In the dressing room and out of the room, he was just a terrific person.

He played most of the next six seasons with the Rochester Americans of the American Hockey League (AHL). He was among the league's scoring leaders for several seasons. With his best statistical season coming in 1964-65 when he scored 106 points (38 goals 68 assists) in 72 games. As he led the team to a Calder cup victory over the Hershey Bears 4 games to 1. He would help the team claim the Calder cup two more times in 1965–66 and 1967–68. He was a great player maker who had a soft touch when the puck was on his stick.

With the increased demand for players with the NHL expansion in 1967, Horvath found himself back in the league with the Minnesota North Stars. At mid-season of that year he returned to the Rochester Americans and helped lead them to the championship. He would finish his career with Rochester and ultimately retired from playing in 1970. Horvath continued to produce until the very end of his career, and finished his AHL career with 263 goals and 484 assists for 747 points in 666 regular-season games. He recorded 542 of those points with the Rochester Americans ranking third all-time in franchise scoring. Horvath was inducted as a charter member of the Rochester Americans Hall of Fame in 1986.

== Post-playing career ==
He became coach of the London Knights of the OHL, from 1971 to 1972. He moved to South Yarmouth, Massachusetts, when he was named coach of the Cape Cod Cubs, an expansion team in the Eastern Hockey League, in 1972. He coached the Cubs to a regular-season divisional championship and a sweep of their first-round playoff series with the Long Island Ducks before a powerful Syracuse Blazers team ended Cape Cod's league championship hopes. Horvath returned as coach for the 1973–74 season with the Cubs, who were charter members of the new North American Hockey League, but was fired after the team got off to a slow start. His last coaching job was a brief stint at Dennis-Yarmouth Regional High School. He resided on Cape Cod, where he spent most his time golfing even trying to on the senior PGA tour however he could not get a sponsor. Also remaining in touch with his former Uke teammates.

Horvath was inducted in the AHL Hall of Fame in 2015, and the Ukrainian Sports Hall of Fame in 2019.

He died on December 17, 2019, in Hyannis, Massachusetts. He survived by his second wife Shelly, his son Mark, four great grandchildren and one great grandchild.

In 2023 he would be named one of the top 100 best Bruins players of all time.

== Career statistics ==
=== Regular season and playoffs ===
			Regular season					Playoffs
Season	Team	League	GP	G	A	Pts	PIM	GP	G	A	Pts	PIM
1948–49	Galt Black Hawks	OHA-Jr.	33	22	18	40	45	—	—	—	—	—
1949–50	Galt Red Wings	OHA-Jr.	47	20	33	53	91	—	—	—	—	—
1949–50	Grand Rapids Rockets	EAHL	5	6	1	7	12	6	2	6	8	8
1950–51	Springfield Indians	AHL	43	12	26	38	37	2	0	0	0	0
1951–52	Syracuse Warriors	AHL	50	12	36	48	56	—	—	—	—	—
1952–53	Syracuse Warriors	AHL	52	19	40	59	44	4	0	0	0	2
1953–54	Springfield Indians	QHL	19	11	14	25	25	—	—	—	—	—
1953–54	Syracuse Warriors	AHL	46	21	39	60	54	—	—	—	—	—
1954–55	Edmonton Flyers	WHL	67	50	60	110	71	16	12	7	19	40
1955–56	New York Rangers	NHL	66	12	17	29	40	5	1	2	3	4
1956–57	New York Rangers	NHL	7	1	2	3	4	—	—	—	—	—
1956–57	Montreal Canadiens	NHL	1	0	0	0	0	—	—	—	—	—
1956–57	Rochester Americans	AHL	56	37	44	81	39	10	6	7	13	14
1957–58	Boston Bruins	NHL	67	30	36	66	71	12	5	3	8	8
1958–59	Boston Bruins	NHL	45	19	20	39	58	7	2	3	5	0
1959–60	Boston Bruins	NHL	68	39	41	80	60	—	—	—	—	—
1960–61	Boston Bruins	NHL	47	15	15	30	15	—	—	—	—	—
1961–62	Chicago Black Hawks	NHL	68	17	29	46	21	12	4	1	5	6
1962–63	New York Rangers	NHL	41	7	15	22	34	—	—	—	—	—
1962–63	Toronto Maple Leafs	NHL	10	0	4	4	12	—	—	—	—	—
1962–63	Rochester Americans	AHL	18	7	15	22	6	—	—	—	—	—
1963–64	Rochester Americans	AHL	70	25	59	84	28	2	0	0	0	2
1964–65	Rochester Americans	AHL	72	38	68	106	24	10	4	5	9	16
1965–66	Rochester Americans	AHL	70	27	48	75	34	12	3	7	10	22
1966–67	Rochester Americans	AHL	72	29	49	78	54	12	2	7	9	2
1967–68	Tulsa Oilers	CPHL	4	1	2	3	0	—	—	—	—	—
1967–68	Rochester Americans	AHL	44	15	29	44	10	10	0	7	7	0
1967–68	Minnesota North Stars	NHL	14	1	6	7	4	—	—	—	—	—
1968–69	Rochester Americans	AHL	66	18	30	48	30	—	—	—	—	—
1969–70	Rochester Americans	AHL	5	3	1	4	0	—	—	—	—	—
AHL totals			664	263	484	747	416	62	15	33	48	58
NHL totals			434	141	185	326	319	36	12	9	21	18

== Awards and honours ==
Award	Year	Ref
NHL
All-Star Game	1960, 1961	
Goal scoring leader	1960	
Second All-Star Team	1960	
AHL
Calder Cup Champion	1964, 1966, 1968	
First All-Star Team	1957	
Second All-Star Team	1964, 1965	
Boston Bruins
Elizabeth C. Dufresne Trophy	1960	
Named one of the top 100 Best Bruins players of all time	2023	

Hall of Fame’s

- Inducted into the Rochester Americans Hall of Fame in 1986
- Inducted into the AHL Hall of Fame in 2015
- Inducted into Ukrainian Sports Hall of Fame in 2019

Preceded by Jean Beliveau	NHL Goal Leader; 1960 (tied with Bobby Hull)	Succeeded by Bernie Geoffrion
