= Forbes Kennedy =

Canadian ice hockey player (1935–2026)

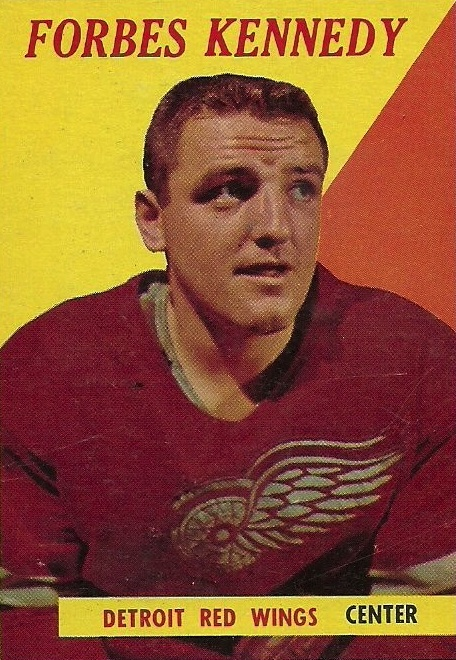
- Born: August 18, 1935 Dorchester, New Brunswick, Canada
- Died: May 26, 2026 (aged 90) Charlottetown, Prince Edward Island, Canada
- Height: 5 ft 8 in (173 cm)
- Weight: 150 lb (68 kg; 10 st 10 lb)
- Position: Centre
- Shot: Left
- Played for: Chicago Black Hawks; Detroit Red Wings; Boston Bruins; Philadelphia Flyers; Toronto Maple Leafs
- Playing career: 1956–1970

Forbes Taylor Kennedy (August 18, 1935 – May 26, 2026) was a Canadian professional ice hockey player. He played 603 games in the National Hockey League (NHL) with five teams between 1956 and 1969, recording 70 goals and 108 assists for 178 points and 888 penalty minutes. Kennedy led the NHL in penalty minutes during the 1968–69 season. After his playing career ended Kennedy became a coach for several seasons.

== Playing career ==
Kennedy was born in Dorchester, New Brunswick, and raised in Prince Edward Island. Despite his small frame (5'8'', 150 lbs.), he was often the most penalized player on the ice.

He spent the following season with the WHL's San Francisco Seals before the team was relocated and renamed for absorption into the NHL, becoming the California Seals.

Kennedy's most infamous game was marked by a violent incident in the 1969 Stanley Cup playoffs in Boston, as teammate Pat Quinn delivered a massive hit to Bruins star Bobby Orr, knocking him unconscious. Kennedy responded to the incident by partaking in four fights before punching a linesman and getting ejected from the game. He received a lengthy suspension and his tenure with the Toronto Maple Leafs ended.

== Post-playing career ==
After retiring, Kennedy began a long coaching career when he coached the Cape Breton Metros of the Maritime Junior A Hockey League in their first year of existence from 1969 to 1970, and then coached the Halifax Junior Canadians from 1970 to 1971. He was brought in to coach the Summerside Crystals of the PEI Junior Hockey League from 1971 to 1972 and 1972 to 1973 before leaving for the Los Angeles Sharks of the WHA to try to resume his playing career. That did not work out for Kennedy due to injuries so he ended his playing career and went back to coaching with the Winston-Salem Polar Twins of the Southern Hockey League. Kennedy returned home a few years later to PEI and coached junior hockey for many years.

On January 16, 2012, Kennedy was honoured by the Summerside Western Capitals of the Maritime Junior Hockey League with a "Forbes Kennedy Night" and he was presented with a plaque in recognition of his service to the team that he coached from 2004 to 2007.

Kennedy died on May 26, 2026, at the age of 90.

== Career statistics ==
=== Regular season and playoffs ===
			Regular season					Playoffs
Season	Team	League	GP	G	A	Pts	PIM	GP	G	A	Pts	PIM
1951–52	Charlottetown Abbies	PEIHA	6	16	8	24	20	6	23	14	37	21
1952–53	Halifax St. Mary's	MMHL	11	16	11	27	24	—	—	—	—	—
1952–53	Halifax St. Mary's	M-Cup	—	—	—	—	—	12	12	7	19	25
1953–54	Montreal Junior Canadiens	QJHL	54	19	19	38	43	8	1	8	9	6
1954–55	Montreal Junior Canadiens	QJHL	46	7	14	21	118	4	0	2	2	4
1955–56	Montreal Junior Canadiens	QJHL	—	—	—	—	—	—	—	—	—	—
1955–56	Montreal Junior Canadiens	M-Cup	—	—	—	—	—	10	3	5	8	19
1955–56	Montreal-Shawinigan	QHL	3	0	3	3	2	—	—	—	—	—
1956–57	Chicago Black Hawks	NHL	69	8	13	21	102	—	—	—	—	—
1957–58	Detroit Red Wings	NHL	70	11	16	27	135	4	1	0	1	12
1958–59	Detroit Red Wings	NHL	67	1	4	5	149	—	—	—	—	—
1959–60	Detroit Red Wings	NHL	17	1	2	3	8	—	—	—	—	—
1959–60	Edmonton Flyers	WHL	30	6	10	16	39	—	—	—	—	—
1959–60	Hershey Bears	AHL	21	3	11	14	50	—	—	—	—	—
1960–61	Spokane Comets	WHL	70	23	38	61	165	4	2	1	3	0
1961–62	Detroit Red Wings	NHL	14	1	0	1	8	—	—	—	—	—
1961–62	Edmonton Flyers	WHL	58	23	31	54	124	—	—	—	—	—
1962–63	Edmonton Flyers	WHL	23	7	15	22	38	—	—	—	—	—
1962–63	Boston Bruins	NHL	49	12	18	30	46	—	—	—	—	—
1963–64	Boston Bruins	NHL	70	8	17	25	95	—	—	—	—	—
1964–65	Boston Bruins	NHL	52	6	4	10	41	—	—	—	—	—
1965–66	Boston Bruins	NHL	50	4	6	10	55	—	—	—	—	—
1965–66	San Francisco Seals	WHL	6	3	3	6	48	—	—	—	—	—
1966–67	California Seals	WHL	71	25	41	66	91	6	2	0	2	4
1967–68	Philadelphia Flyers	NHL	73	10	18	28	130	7	1	4	5	14
1968–69	Philadelphia Flyers	NHL	59	8	7	15	195	—	—	—	—	—
1968–69	Toronto Maple Leafs	NHL	13	0	3	3	24	1	0	0	0	38
1969–70	Buffalo Bisons	AHL	19	2	1	3	42	4	0	0	0	0
1969–70	Omaha Knights	CHL	—	—	—	—	—	6	0	1	1	7
NHL totals			603	70	108	178	988	12	2	4	6	64
