= 1957–58 NHL season =

National Hockey League season

- League: National Hockey League
- Sport: Ice hockey
- Duration: October 8, 1957 – April 20, 1958
- Games: 70
- Teams: 6
- TV partner(s): CBC, SRC (Canada); CBS (United States)

Regular season
- Season champion: Montreal Canadiens
- Season MVP: Gordie Howe (Red Wings)
- Top scorer: Dickie Moore (Canadiens)

Stanley Cup
- Champions: Montreal Canadiens
- Runners-up: Boston Bruins

NHL seasons
- ← 1956–57 1958–59 →

The 1957–58 NHL season was the 41st season of the National Hockey League. Six teams played 70 games each. The Montreal Canadiens won the Stanley Cup for the third consecutive season, defeating the Boston Bruins four games to two in the best-of-seven final series.

== League business ==
It was announced in September that Senator Hartland Molson had purchased 60% stock from the Canadian Arena Company and the Montreal Canadiens from Senator Donat Raymond.

=== Organization of Players' Association ===
Doug Harvey and Ted Lindsay led the drive to form (on February 11, 1957) the National Hockey League Players' Association (NHLPA), a workers' labour association, and sued the NHL over the issue of player pensions, salaries during training camp, meal allowances, remuneration for exhibition games and a no-trade clause after six years service. Lindsay lost his captaincy of the Detroit Red Wings and was traded to Chicago, on July 23, 1957, in an effort to intimidate the players.

After the NHL declined to negotiate with the players over benefits and would not open the books on the pension plan, the player's association filed an antitrust lawsuit on October 10, 1957. The lawsuit alleged the monopolization of the professional hockey industry since 1926, in violation of the Sherman and Clayton Antitrust Acts. Furthermore, On November 6, 1957, the Toronto Maple Leafs players voted unanimously to certify the union.

The NHL started to fight back. First, they traded Lindsay to Chicago to separate him from the Red Wings, the American team the NHLPA had targeted for a certification vote. Next, Jack Adams spread false stories in the press alleging various slanders had been made by Lindsay against the Red Wings players, and produced a fake contract to the press showing an over-inflated salary for Lindsay, greater than Hart Trophy MVP, teammate and friend Gordie Howe. The ruse worked and the Red Wings players decided to dis-associate themselves from the NHLPA on November 13, 1957.

Part of the problem of organizing the players was confusion about the type of association they were forming. The NHLPA had applied, in Canada, to the Ontario Labour Relations Board for certification, but the ORLB had no experience with workers like hockey players. NHLPA members negotiated individual contracts and wanted to continue to bargain this way. The matter of the NHLPA being an actual union, where the members were bound together and fought for collective agreements, was unclear. The NHLPA legal counsel, Milton Mound, addressed this, saying that the players would negotiate on matters common to all players (pensions, allowances) but retained the right to individual contracts. The League, and especially Conn Smythe, argued that players were forming a "trade union" and were no better than "commies" and would lose things like individual bonuses. He believed that hockey players were in the business of being "independent contractors" and had no right or reason for a collective organization.

The confusion worried both employer and employee. The situation was exacerbated by the certification process. The OLRB was taking time, and no one knew how this transnational association would work, or how it would be recognized by the US National Labor Relations Board. In fact, the NLRB asked the NHLPA to withdraw its unfair labor practices charge on November 20, 1957, arguing it did not have jurisdiction. This was followed by the Montreal Canadiens players rejection of the association in early January 1958.

The OLRB resumed meeting on January 7, but both the League and the players were concerned. The NHL was convinced that the ORLB was not going to dismiss the application, regardless of how they ruled on the union versus association issue, and the players were worried (given the setbacks in Detroit and Montreal) that they didn't have grounds to actually form an association (especially since they didn't want to be a traditional "union.")

The players and owners both felt pressure to conclude something, so they gathered, without lawyers, for a 13-hour meeting in the boardroom of the Biltmore Hotel in Palm Beach, just after the regular NHL winter meetings. In an out-of-court settlement on February 5, 1958, the NHL promised:

- a $7,000 minimum wage (which was, in actuality, the unofficial League norm,)
- an increase in pension benefits,
- increased hospitalization benefits,
- a limit on the number of exhibition games,
- the player shall be the sole judge of his physical fitness to play after injury.

Ross concludes:

In the end, the players had little to show for their rebellion. A few cosmetic changes were made, but even the communication problem did not seem to have been solved. Over the ensuing seasons the Owner-Player Council did not even meet regularly, and paternalism prevailed. It was not until 1967 that the idea of a union once again gained currency, again in an era of general revived interest across all the major league sports. The fundamental question at the root of the NHLPA failure was whether players really were laborers who could form a trade union. Seemingly caught in a space both commercial and non-commercial, players felt uneasy locating themselves wholly within either. This in itself reflected the success of the owners in using cultural formations to restrain their labor force. Led by Conn Smythe, the league appealed to cultural bonds of loyalty and tradition as justifications for retaining the existing economic structure of labor-management relations, long after other industries had been forced by the state to move toward formal, union-led collective bargaining arrangements.

== Regular season ==
This season saw the Montreal Canadiens regain first place overall, while the previous season's leader, the Detroit Red Wings, slipped to third. Montreal's Maurice "Rocket" Richard became the first NHL player to score 500 career goals, Jacques Plante won his third straight Vezina Trophy, and Doug Harvey his fourth straight Norris Trophy.

Glenn Hall, after two playoff years in which the Wings were eliminated, was traded, along with Ted Lindsay to the Chicago Black Hawks and Terry Sawchuk was brought back to Detroit in a deal that saw Larry Hillman and Johnny Bucyk go to Boston. Chicago almost made the playoffs, and Hall's goaltending, including seven shutouts, one of which was in his debut with the Hawks, made him a contender for the Hart Trophy.

On October 19, 1957, Rocket Richard, in a 3–1 win over Chicago, scored his 500th career goal, against Glenn Hall. He immediately dedicated it to his old coach Dick Irvin, who had died on May 15, 1957, after a long bout with bone cancer.

When Marcel Paille was brought up to the Rangers from Providence of the AHL for the ailing Gump Worsley, he sparkled, and Worsley was sent down to Providence, though he was eventually recalled. Worsley had his finest campaign up to this point, with a 2.32 goals-against average and four shutouts, and the Rangers finished second – their highest finish since 1941–42.

Two contenders for the Calder Memorial Trophy, Chicago's Bobby Hull and the Toronto Maple Leafs' Frank Mahovlich, battled all season for rookie honours. Mahovlich prevailed, although the Maple Leafs finished last in the NHL.

This season also saw the first player of African descent play in the league. Willie O'Ree suited up with the Boston Bruins on January 18, 1958, in a game against the Canadiens in Montreal.

=== Final standings ===
National Hockey League
		GP	W	L	T	GF	GA	DIFF	Pts
1	Montreal Canadiens	70	43	17	10	250	158	+92	96
2	New York Rangers	70	32	25	13	195	188	+7	77
3	Detroit Red Wings	70	29	29	12	176	207	−31	70
4	Boston Bruins	70	27	28	15	199	194	+5	69
5	Chicago Black Hawks	70	24	39	7	163	202	−39	55
6	Toronto Maple Leafs	70	21	38	11	192	226	−34	53

== Playoffs ==
=== Playoff bracket ===
The top four teams in the league qualified for the playoffs. In the semifinals, the first-place team played the third-place team, while the second-place team faced the fourth-place team, with the winners advancing to the Stanley Cup Finals. In both rounds, teams competed in a best-of-seven series (scores in the bracket indicate the number of games won in each best-of-seven series).

Semifinals
1	Montreal	4
3	Detroit	0
2	New York	2
4	Boston	4

Stanley Cup Finals
1	Montreal	4
4	Boston	2

=== Semifinals ===
==== (1) Montreal Canadiens vs. (3) Detroit Red Wings ====
March 25	Detroit Red Wings	1–8	Montreal Canadiens	Montreal Forum	Recap
No scoring		First period	02:22 – Maurice Richard (1); 04:07 – pp – Maurice Richard (2); 06:20 – Jean Beliveau (1); 08:55 – pp – Bernie Geoffrion (1); 14:23 – Phil Goyette (1)
Johnny Wilson (1) – pp – 12:19		Second period	03:59 – Phil Goyette (2)
No scoring		Third period	12:17 – pp – Dickie Moore (1); 17:56 – Phil Goyette (3)
Terry Sawchuck 27 saves / 35 shots		Goalie stats	Jacques Plante 39 saves / 40 shots

March 27	Detroit Red Wings	1–5	Montreal Canadiens	Montreal Forum	Recap
No scoring		First period	18:04 – Phil Goyette (4)
Johnny Wilson (2) – 13:39		Second period	17:13 – Jean Beliveau (2)
No scoring		Third period	05:05 – pp – Maurice Richard (3); 05:18 – Andre Pronovost (1); 12:23 – Maurice Richard (4)
Terry Sawchuck 35 saves / 40 shots		Goalie stats	Jacques Plante 25 saves / 26 shots

March 30	Montreal Canadiens	2–1	OT	Detroit Red Wings	Olympia Stadium	Recap
No scoring		First period		No scoring
Dickie Moore (2) – pp – 16:00		Second period		14:07 – Forbes Kennedy (1)
No scoring		Third period		No scoring
Andre Pronovost (2) – 11:52		First overtime period		No scoring
Jacques Plante 29 saves / 30 shots		Goalie stats		Terry Sawchuck 24 saves / 26 shots

April 1	Montreal Canadiens	4–3	Detroit Red Wings	Olympia Stadium	Recap
No scoring		First period	No scoring
Maurice Richard (5) – 08:45		Second period	05:49 – Jack McIntyre (1); 10:27 – Gordie Howe (1); 11:13 – Billy McNeill (1)
Maurice Richard (6) – pp – 04:00; Dickie Moore (3) – pp – 09:07; Maurice Richard (7) – 09:56		Third period	No scoring
Jacques Plante 31 saves / 34 shots		Goalie stats	Terry Sawchuck 26 saves / 30 shots

Montreal won series 4–0

==== (2) New York Rangers vs. (4) Boston Bruins ====
March 25	Boston Bruins	3–5	New York Rangers	Madison Square Garden III	Recap
Fleming MacKell (1) – 00:58; Jerry Toppazzini (1) – 07:21		First period	04:40 – Larry Popein (1); 10:45 – sh – Andy Hebenton (1); 18:38 – pp – Camille Henry (1)
Bronco Horvath (1) – 17:45		Second period	10:29 – pp – Dave Creighton (1)
No scoring		Third period	17:01 – Dave Creighton (2)
Harry Lumley 25 saves / 30 shots		Goalie stats	Gump Worsley 26 saves / 29 shots

March 27	Boston Bruins	4–3	OT	New York Rangers	Madison Square Garden III	Recap
Doug Mohns (1) – pp – 05:05; Don McKenney (1) – 19:38		First period		05:28 – Andy Bathgate (1); 08:58 – pp – Andy Bathgate (2)
No scoring		Second period		07:24 – Jean-Guy Gendron (1)
Don McKenney (2) – 11:13		Third period		No scoring
Jerry Toppazzini (2) – 04:46		First overtime period		No scoring
Don Simmons 27 saves / 30 shots		Goalie stats		Gump Worsley 21 saves / 25 shots

March 29	New York Rangers	0–5	Boston Bruins	Boston Garden	Recap
No scoring		First period	09:24 – pp – Doug Mohns (2); 13:18 – pp – Don McKenney (3); 17:40 – pp – Don McKenney (4)
No scoring		Second period	04:01 – Buddy Boone (1)
No scoring		Third period	07:36 – sh – Norm Johnson (1)
Gump Worsley 31 saves / 36 shots		Goalie stats	Don Simmons 28 saves / 28 shots

April 1	New York Rangers	5–2	Boston Bruins	Boston Garden	Recap
Dean Prentice (1) – sh – 05:19; Dave Creighton (3) – pp – 09:47		First period	No scoring
Andy Hebenton (2) – 10:17; Andy Bathgate (3) – sh – 15:12		Second period	02:04 – pp – Jerry Toppazzini (3)
Andy Bathgate (4) – en – 19:41		Third period	11:32 – sh – Jerry Toppazzini (4)
Gump Worsley 39 saves / 41 shots		Goalie stats	Don Simmons 30 saves / 34 shots

April 3	New York Rangers	1–6	Boston Bruins	Boston Garden	Recap
No scoring		First period	06:43 – Fleming MacKell (2); 09:11 – pp – Bronco Horvath (2); 11:24 – Don McKenney (5)
Parker MacDonald (1) – 12:44		Second period	05:10 – sh – Fern Flaman (1); 10:20 – Fern Flaman (2)
No scoring		Third period	16:32 – pp – Jerry Toppazzini (5)
Gump Worsley 36 saves / 42 shots		Goalie stats	Don Simmons 26 saves / 27 shots

April 5	New York Rangers	2–8	Boston Bruins	Boston Garden	Recap
Harry Howell (1) – 14:33		First period	00:58 – pp – Larry Regan (1); 07:27 – sh – Jerry Toppazzini (6); 11:04 – pp – Norm Johnson (2); 17:20 – Fleming MacKell (3)
Andy Bathgate (5) – pp – 04:55		Second period	13:29 – Doug Mohns (3)
No scoring		Third period	08:29 – Fleming MacKell (4); 08:58 – Jerry Toppazzini (7); 17:49 – Jerry Toppazzini (8)
Gump Worsley 26 saves / 28 shots		Goalie stats	Don Simmons 36 saves / 44 shots

Boston won series 4–2

=== Stanley Cup Finals ===
The Canadiens made their eighth consecutive appearance in the Stanley Cup Finals and defeated the Bruins in six games. It was the Canadiens' third consecutive Stanley Cup triumph.

April 8	Boston Bruins	1–2	Montreal Canadiens	Montreal Forum	Recap
No scoring		First period	12:24 – pp – Bernie Geoffrion (2)
Allan Stanley (1) – pp – 05:54		Second period	13:52 – pp – Dickie Moore (4)
No scoring		Third period	No scoring
Don Simmons 42 saves / 44 shots		Goalie stats	Jacques Plante 28 saves / 29 shots

April 10	Boston Bruins	5–2	Montreal Canadiens	Montreal Forum	Recap
Norm Johnson (3) – 00:20; Don McKenney (6) – pp – 06:58; Bronco Horvath (3) – pp – 17:23		First period	03:12 – pp – Bernie Geoffrion (3)
Larry Regan (2) – 05:00		Second period	07:00 – Doug Harvey (1)
Bronco Horvath (4) – 16:52		Third period	No scoring
Don Simmons 31 saves / 33 shots		Goalie stats	Jacques Plante 27 saves / 32 shots

April 13	Montreal Canadiens	3–0	Boston Bruins	Boston Garden	Recap
Maurice Richard (8) – 18:20		First period	No scoring
No scoring		Second period	No scoring
Henri Richard (1) – 03:00; Maurice Richard (9) – 15:06		Third period	No scoring
Jacques Plante 18 saves / 18 shots		Goalie stats	Don Simmons 27 saves / 30 shots

April 15	Montreal Canadiens	1–3	Boston Bruins	Boston Garden	Recap
No scoring		First period	05:35 – pp – Don McKenney (7)
No scoring		Second period	03:30 – Don McKenney (8)
Claude Provost (1)		Third period	02:30 – Jerry Toppazzini (9)
Jacques Plante 27 saves / 30 shots		Goalie stats	Don Simmons 23 saves / 24 shots

April 17	Boston Bruins	2–3	OT	Montreal Canadiens	Montreal Forum	Recap
Fleming MacKell (5) – pp – 18:43		First period		No scoring
No scoring		Second period		02:20 – Bernie Geoffrion (4); 03:02 – Jean Beliveau (3)
Bronco Horvath (5) – 10:35		Third period		No scoring
No scoring		First overtime period		05:45 – Maurice Richard (10)
Don Simmons 44 saves / 47 shots		Goalie stats		Jacques Plante 38 saves / 40 shots

April 20	Montreal Canadiens	5–3	Boston Bruins	Boston Garden	Recap
Bernie Geoffrion (5) – 00:46; Maurice Richard (11) – 01:54		First period	18:35 – Don McKenney (9)
Jean Beliveau (4) – 06:42; Bernie Geoffrion (6) – 19:26		Second period	No scoring
Doug Harvey (2) – en – 19:00		Third period	05:20 – Norm Johnson; 13:41 – Larry Regan (3)
Jacques Plante 31 saves / 34 shots		Goalie stats	Don Simmons 41 saves / 45 shots

Montreal won series 4–2

== Awards ==
Award winners
Prince of Wales Trophy: (Regular season champion)	Montreal Canadiens
Art Ross Trophy: (Top scorer)	Dickie Moore, Montreal Canadiens
Calder Memorial Trophy: (Best first-year player)	Frank Mahovlich, Toronto Maple Leafs
Hart Trophy: (Most valuable player)	Gordie Howe, Detroit Red Wings
James Norris Memorial Trophy: (Best defenceman)	Doug Harvey, Montreal Canadiens
Lady Byng Memorial Trophy: (Excellence and sportsmanship)	Camille Henry, New York Rangers
Vezina Trophy: (Goaltender of team with the best goals-against average)	Jacques Plante, Montreal Canadiens

=== All-Star teams ===
First team	Position	Second team
Glenn Hall, Chicago Black Hawks	G	Jacques Plante, Montreal Canadiens
Doug Harvey, Montreal Canadiens	D	Fern Flaman, Boston Bruins
Bill Gadsby, New York Rangers	D	Marcel Pronovost, Detroit Red Wings
Henri Richard, Montreal Canadiens	C	Jean Beliveau, Montreal Canadiens
Gordie Howe, Detroit Red Wings	RW	Andy Bathgate, New York Rangers
Dickie Moore, Montreal Canadiens	LW	Camille Henry, New York Rangers

== Player statistics ==
=== Scoring leaders ===
Note: GP = Games played, G = Goals, A = Assists, PTS = Points, PIM = Penalties in minutes

Player	Team	GP	G	A	Pts	PIM
Dickie Moore	Montreal Canadiens	70	36	48	84	65
Henri Richard	Montreal Canadiens	67	28	52	80	56
Andy Bathgate	New York Rangers	65	30	48	78	42
Gordie Howe	Detroit Red Wings	64	33	44	77	40
Bronco Horvath	Boston Bruins	67	30	36	66	71
Ed Litzenberger	Chicago Black Hawks	70	32	30	62	63
Fleming Mackell	Boston Bruins	70	20	40	60	72
Jean Beliveau	Montreal Canadiens	55	27	32	59	93
Alex Delvecchio	Detroit Red Wings	70	21	38	59	22
Don McKenney	Boston Bruins	70	28	30	58	22

=== Leading goaltenders ===
Note: GP = Games played; Min = Minutes played; GA = Goals against; GAA = Goals against average; W = Wins; L = Losses; T = Ties; SO = Shutouts

Player	Team	GP	MIN	GA	GAA	W	L	T	SO
Jacques Plante	Montreal Canadiens	57	3386	119	2.11	34	14	8	9
Lorne Worsley	New York Rangers	37	2220	86	2.32	21	10	6	4
Don Simmons	Boston Bruins	39	2288	92	2.41	15	14	9	5
Harry Lumley	Boston Bruins	24	1500	71	2.84	11	10	3	3
Glenn Hall	Chicago Black Hawks	70	4200	200	2.86	24	39	7	7
Terry Sawchuk	Detroit Red Wings	70	4200	205	2.94	29	29	12	3
Marcel Paille	New York Rangers	33	1980	102	3.09	11	15	7	1
Ed Chadwick	Toronto Maple Leafs	70	4200	223	3.19	21	38	11	4

== Coaches ==
- Boston Bruins: Milt Schmidt
- Chicago Black Hawks: Rudy Pilous
- Detroit Red Wings: Jimmy Skinner
- Montreal Canadiens: Toe Blake
- New York Rangers: Phil Watson
- Toronto Maple Leafs: Billy Reay

== Debuts ==
The following is a list of players of note who played their first NHL game in 1957–58 (listed with their first team, asterisk(*) marks debut in playoffs):

- Willie O'Ree, Boston Bruins (first-ever black player to play in the NHL)
- Bobby Hull, Chicago Black Hawks
- Murray Oliver, Detroit Red Wings
- Ab McDonald*, Montreal Canadiens
- Carl Brewer, Toronto Maple Leafs
- Bob Nevin, Toronto Maple Leafs

== Last games ==
The following is a list of players of note who played their last game in the NHL in 1957–58 (listed with their last team):

- Johnny Peirson, Boston Bruins
- Jimmy Thomson, Chicago Black Hawks
- Tony Leswick, Detroit Red Wings
- Metro Prystai, Detroit Red Wings
- Floyd Curry, Montreal Canadiens
- Sid Smith, Toronto Maple Leafs

== Broadcasting ==
Hockey Night in Canada on CBC Television televised Saturday night regular season games and selected Stanley Cup playoff games. Games were not broadcast in their entirety until the 1968–69 season, and were typically joined in progress, while the radio version of HNIC aired games in their entirety.

In the U.S., this was the second season of a four-year deal with CBS to televise Saturday afternoon regular season games. This season, CBS aired games from November to March.

== See also ==
- 1957–58 NHL transactions
- 1957 NHL Intra-League Draft
- List of Stanley Cup champions
- National Hockey League All-Star Game
- 1957 in sports
- 1958 in sports
