= 1955 Stanley Cup Final =

1955 ice hockey championship series

	1	2	3	4	5	6	7	Total
Detroit Red Wings	4	7	2	3	5	3	3	4
Montreal Canadiens	2	1	4	5	1	6	1	3
- Location(s): Detroit: Olympia Stadium (1, 2, 5, 7); Montreal: Montreal Forum (3, 4, 6)
- Coaches: Detroit: Jimmy Skinner; Montreal: Dick Irvin
- Captains: Detroit: Ted Lindsay; Montreal: Emile Bouchard
- Dates: April 3–14, 1955
- Series-winning goal: Gordie Howe (19:49, second)
- Hall of Famers: Red Wings: Alex Delvecchio (1977); Gordie Howe (1972); Red Kelly (1969); Ted Lindsay (1966); Marcel Pronovost (1978); Terry Sawchuk (1971); Canadiens: Jean Beliveau (1972); Emile Bouchard (1966); Bernie Geoffrion (1972); Doug Harvey (1973); Tom Johnson (1970); Dickie Moore (1974); Bert Olmstead (1985); Jacques Plante (1978); Maurice Richard (1961; did not play); Coaches: Dick Irvin (1958, player)

The 1955 Stanley Cup Final was the championship series of the National Hockey League's (NHL) 1954–55 season, and the culmination of the 1955 Stanley Cup playoffs. It was contested between the Montreal Canadiens, appearing in their fifth of ten straight Finals, and the defending champion Detroit Red Wings, in the third Detroit-Montreal Finals series of the 1950s and the second consecutively. In a series where neither team won a road game, the Red Wings once again defeated the Canadiens in seven games for their second consecutive Stanley Cup championship, fourth in six seasons, and seventh overall.

This was the Red Wings’ last Stanley Cup championship until 1997, and as of 2026, remains the last time they won Game 7 of the Final. It also marked the last time that a U.S.-based team defeated a Canada-based team in the championship round until 1982.

As of 2026, 1955 remains the only year in which the Stanley Cup Final, NBA Finals, and World Series all went the full seven games.

== Paths to the Finals ==
Montreal defeated the Boston Bruins in five games to reach the Finals. Detroit defeated the Toronto Maple Leafs in four games to reach the Finals.

== Game summaries ==
Prior to the playoffs, Montreal's Maurice Richard was suspended and would be missed by the Canadiens.

In the second game, Ted Lindsay scored four goals to set an NHL record for most goals in one game in a Finals series.

Gordie Howe set two NHL records, amassing 12 points in this round, and surpassing former Canadiens player (and soon-to-be-coach) Toe Blake's point mark for the playoffs with 20 points in 11 games.

This was also the first Finals in which the home team won all seven games of the series, a feat that would be repeated only twice in the next 50 years, in 1965 (Montreal defeated the Chicago Black Hawks) and 2003 (the New Jersey Devils beat the Mighty Ducks of Anaheim).

April 3	Montreal Canadiens	2–4	Detroit Red Wings	Olympia Stadium	Recap
No scoring		First period	No scoring
Floyd Curry (4) - 5:09		Second period	14:00 - pp - Alex Delvecchio (2)
Floyd Curry (5) - 8:57		Third period	13:05 - Vic Stasiuk (3); 17:07 - sh - Marty Pavelich (1); 19:42 - en - Ted Lindsay (3)
Jacques Plante 26 saves / 29 shots		Goalie stats	Terry Sawchuck 20 saves / 22 shots

April 5	Montreal Canadiens	1–7	Detroit Red Wings	Olympia Stadium	Recap
No scoring		First period	2:15 - sh - Marcel Pronovost (1); 9:57 - Ted Lindsay (4); 16:00 - Alex Delvecchio (3); 17:11 - Gordie Howe (5)
No scoring		Second period	8:10 - Ted Lindsay (5); 15:48 - pp - Ted Lindsay (6); 19:37 - Ted Lindsay (7)
Ken Mosdell (2) - 12:32		Third period	No scoring
Charlie Hodge 7 saves / 10 shots Jacques Plante 36 saves / 40 shots		Goalie stats	Terry Sawchuck 26 saves / 27 shots

April 7	Detroit Red Wings	2–4	Montreal Canadiens	Montreal Forum	Recap
Red Kelly (1) - pp - 18:13		First period	8:30 - pp - Bernie Geoffrion (3); 8:42 - pp - Bernie Geoffrion (4)
Vic Stasiuk (4) - 16:16		Second period	14:23 - Bernie Geoffrion (5)
No scoring		Third period	7:50 - Jack LeClair (4)
Terry Sawchuck 22 saves / 26 shots		Goalie stats	Jacques Plante 35 saves / 37 shots

April 9	Detroit Red Wings	3–5	Montreal Canadiens	Montreal Forum	Recap
Dutch Reibel (4) - 12:38		First period	00:40 - Calum MacKay (2)
No scoring		Second period	3:41 - Bernie Geoffrion (6); 8:25 - Jean Beliveau (4); 9:07 - Tom Johnson (2)
Dutch Reibel (5) - 3:40; Jim Hay (1) - 12:00		Third period	2:33 - Floyd Curry (6)
Terry Sawchuck 25 saves / 30 shots		Goalie stats	Jacques Plante 37 saves / 40 shots

April 10	Montreal Canadiens	1–5	Detroit Red Wings	Olympia Stadium	Recap
Jean Beliveau (5) - pp - 8:01		First period	12:59 - Glen Skov (2); 18:59 - Gordie Howe (6)
No scoring		Second period	12:29 - pp - Gordie Howe (7); 16:20 - pp - Gordie Howe (8)
No scoring		Third period	2:09 - Vic Stasiuk (5)
Jacques Plante 36 saves / 41 shots		Goalie stats	Terry Sawchuck 20 saves / 21 shots

April 12	Detroit Red Wings	3–6	Montreal Canadiens	Montreal Forum	Recap
Alex Delvecchio (4) - 13:36		First period	7:30 - Jean Beliveau (6)
Alex Delvecchio (5) - pp - 15:54		Second period	3:45 - pp - Jack LeClair (5); 5:21 - pp - Bernie Geoffrion (7); 18:18 - Bernie Geoffrion (8)
Red Kelly (2) - 16:23		Third period	00:19 - Floyd Curry (7); 18:55 - Calum MacKay (3)
Terry Sawchuck 33 saves / 39 shots		Goalie stats	Jacques Plante 35 saves / 38 shots

April 14	Montreal Canadiens	1–3	Detroit Red Wings	Olympia Stadium	Recap
No scoring		First period	No scoring
No scoring		Second period	7:12 - Alex Delvecchio (6); 19:49 - Gordie Howe (9)
Floyd Curry (8) - pp - 14:35		Third period	2:59 - Alex Delvecchio (7)
Jacques Plante 30 saves / 33 shots		Goalie stats	Terry Sawchuck 21 saves / 22 shots

Detroit won series 4–3

== Stanley Cup engraving ==
The 1955 Stanley Cup was presented to Red Wings captain Ted Lindsay by NHL President Clarence Campbell following the Red Wings' 3–1 win over the Canadiens in game seven.

The following Red Wings players and staff had their names engraved on the Stanley Cup:

1954–55 Detroit Red Wings

=== Players ===
Centres

- 12 Glen Skov
- 14 Earl Reibel
- 10 Alex Delvecchio
- 19 Vic Stasiuk

Wingers

- 7 Ted Lindsay (Captain)
- 8 Tony Leswick
- 9 Gordie Howe
- 11 Marty Pavelich
- 16 John Wilson
- 17 Bill Dineen
- 20 Marcel Bonin

Defencemen

- 2 Bob Goldham (A)
- 3 Marcel Pronovost
- 4 Leonard Red Kelly (A)
- 5 Benny Woit
- 15 Larry Hillman
- 18 Jim Hay

Goaltenders

- 1 Terry Sawchuk

=== Coaching and administrative staff ===
- Marguerite Norris (President/Owner), Bruce Norris (Vice President/Owner)
- Jack Adams (Manager), Jimmy Skinner (Coach)
- John Mitchell (Chief Scout), Carl Mattson (Trainer)
- Fred Huber Jr. (Publicity Director), Ross "Lefty" Wilson (Asst. Trainer)

=== Stanley Cup engraving ===
- Larry Hillman became the youngest player to be engraved on the Stanley Cup at 18 years, 2 months, 9 days. Gaye Stewart held the previous record in 1942 at 18 years, 9 months, and 21 days.
- Wally Crossman (Asst. Trainer/Stick Boy) was left off the Stanley Cup, and team picture.
- Marguerite Norris was the first woman to win back-to-back Stanley Cups in 1953–54, 1954–55.
- Jimmy Skinner was the 8th NHL rookie coach to win the Stanley Cup.
- Glenn Hall played 2 games for Detroit during the season. He was spare goalie for the finals. Hall spent most regular-season and playoffs playing for the Edmonton Flyers(WHL). So, his name was left off the Stanley Cup.

=== Members of Detroit Red Wings Dynasty 1950, 1952, 1954, 1955 ===
Gordie Howe, Red Kelly, Ted Lindsay, Marty Pavelich, Marcel Pronovost, John Wilson (6 Players), Jack Adams, Carl Mattson, Fred Hubert Jr. (3 Non-players).

== Aftermath ==
The next year, the Red Wings again met the Canadiens in the Finals in the hopes of a three-peat, but Montreal would get revenge on Detroit, winning the Cup in five games. The Canadiens then started a dynasty, winning the Stanley Cup the next four years, in 1957, 1958, 1959, and 1960.

The loss marked the end of the Red Wings’ dynasty. The Red Wings would return to the Finals in 1961, 1963, 1964, and 1966, but they would lose each one. They then entered a near 20 year slump known as the "Dead Wings" era, in which they would only make the playoffs twice between 1967 and 1983. The Red Wings would not win the Stanley Cup again until 1997, in which they swept the Philadelphia Flyers, starting another dynasty.

== See also ==
- 1954–55 NHL season

== Notes ==
Preceded by Detroit Red Wings; 1954	Detroit Red Wings; Stanley Cup champions 1955	Succeeded by Montreal Canadiens; 1956
