= 10th National Hockey League All-Star Game =

Professional ice hockey exhibition game

10th NHL All-Star Game
	1	2	3	Total
All-Star team	0	1	0	1
Montreal Canadiens	0	1	0	1
- Date: October 9, 1956
- Arena: Montreal Forum
- City: Montreal
- Attendance: 13,095

The 10th National Hockey League All-Star Game took place at the Montreal Forum, home of the Montreal Canadiens, on October 9, 1956. The Canadiens, winner of the 1956 Stanley Cup Finals, played a team of All-Stars, with the game ending in a 1–1 tie.

== Boxscore ==
	NHL All-Stars	Montreal Canadiens
Final score	1	1
Head coach	Jimmy Skinner (Detroit Red Wings)	Toe Blake (Montreal Canadiens)
Lineup	Starting lineup: 1 - G Glenn Hall (Detroit Red Wings; 2 - D Gus Mortson (Chicago Black Hawks); 3 - D Jim Morrison (Toronto Maple Leafs); 4 - D Red Kelly (Detroit Red Wings); 5 - D Hugh Bolton (Toronto Maple Leafs); 6 - LW Dick Duff (Toronto Maple Leafs); 7 - LW Ted Lindsay (Detroit Red Wings); 8 - C Alex Delvecchio (Detroit Red Wings); 9 - RW Leo Labine (Boston Bruins); 10 - RW George Armstrong (Toronto Maple Leafs); 11 - LW Nick Mickoski (Chicago Black Hawks); 12 - C Tod Sloan (Toronto Maple Leafs); 14 - D Fern Flaman (Boston Bruins); 15 - LW Johnny Wilson (Chicago Black Hawks); 16 - D Bill Gadsby (New York Rangers); 18 - RW Wally Hergesheimer (Chicago Black Hawks); 19 - C Dave Creighton (New York Rangers); 20 - C Red Sullivan (Chicago Black Hawks); 24 - G Terry Sawchuk (Boston Bruins)	Starting lineup: 1 - G Jacques Plante; 2 - D Doug Harvey; 4 - C Jean Beliveau; 5 - RW Bernie Geoffrion; 6 - RW Floyd Curry; 8 - C Jack LeClair; 9 - RW Maurice Richard, C; 10 - D Tom Johnson; 11 - D Bob Turner; 12 - RW Dickie Moore; 14 - RW Claude Provost; 15 - LW Bert Olmstead; 16 - C Henri Richard; 17 - D Jean-Guy Talbot; 19 - D Dollard St. Laurent; 22 - LW Don Marshall
Scoring summary	Lindsay (Mortson), 18:48 2nd	M. Richard (Olmstead, Harvey), 14:58 2nd (PPG)
Penalties	Flaman, 1:42 1st; Mortson, 8:14 2nd; Sullivan, 14:25 2nd; Labine, 2:17 3rd; Mortson, 9:42 3rd	Beliveau, 7:44 1st; Beliveau, 18:29 1st
Win/loss	T - Glenn Hall	T - Jacques Plante

- Referee: Red Storey
- Linesmen: Doug Davies, Bill Roberts

== Notes ==
^1Named to the first All-Star team in 1955–56.
^2Named to the second All-Star team in 1955–56.
