= 1954–55 NHL transactions =

The following is a list of all team-to-team transactions that have occurred in the National Hockey League (NHL) during the 1954–55 NHL season. It lists which team each player has been traded to and for which player(s) or other consideration(s), if applicable.

== Transactions ==
May 14, 1954	To Toronto Maple Leafs Brian Cullen	To Chicago Black Hawks Dusty Blair; Jack LeClair; Frank Sullivan
June 8, 1954^{1}	To Montreal Canadiens Hy Buller	To New York Rangers Dick Gamble rights to Ed Dorohoy
July 20, 1954	To Toronto Maple Leafs cash	To New York Rangers Danny Lewicki
July 20, 1954	To Toronto Maple Leafs Dave Creighton	To Boston Bruins Fern Flaman
August 10, 1954	To Toronto Maple Leafs cash	To Chicago Black Hawks Bob Hassard
September 10, 1954	To Boston Bruins cash	To Chicago Black Hawks Red Sullivan
September 23, 1954	To Toronto Maple Leafs Ray Gariepy	To Boston Bruins John Henderson
October 4, 1954	To Toronto Maple Leafs Jack Price	To Chicago Black Hawks Ray Timgren
October 4, 1954	To Boston Bruins Murray Costello	To Chicago Black Hawks Frank Martin
October 9, 1954	To Montreal Canadiens Bill Shevtz cash	To Chicago Black Hawks Dick Gamble
October 13, 1954	To Montreal Canadiens Ike Hildebrand future considerations	To Chicago Black Hawks Lorne Davis
October 25, 1954	To Montreal Canadiens Jean Lamirande	To New York Rangers cash
November 9, 1954	To Detroit Red Wings Lorne Davis	To Chicago Black Hawks Metro Prystai
November 9, 1954	To Toronto Maple Leafs Joe Klukay	To Boston Bruins Leo Boivin
November 9, 1954	To Montreal Canadiens loan of Al Dewsbury	To Chicago Black Hawks loan of Paul Masnick cash
November 16, 1954	To Toronto Maple Leafs cash	To Chicago Black Hawks Dave Creighton
November 16, 1954	To Toronto Maple Leafs Bob Hassard	To Chicago Black Hawks cash
November 23, 1954	To Chicago Black Hawks Rich Lamoureux; Nick Mickoski; Allan Stanley	To New York Rangers Pete Conacher; Bill Gadsby
December 10, 1954	To Montreal Canadiens cash	To Chicago Black Hawks Ed Litzenberger

Notes

1. Montreal holding the right to recall Dorohoy if he failed to make the Rangers' roster. Transaction cancelled when Buller retired in September, 1954 (exact date unknown).
