= 1956 Stanley Cup Final =

1956 ice hockey championship series

	1	2	3	4	5	Total
Montreal Canadiens	6	5	1	3	3	4
Detroit Red Wings	4	1	3	0	1	1
- Location(s): Montreal: Montreal Forum (1, 2, 5); Detroit: Olympia Stadium (3, 4)
- Coaches: Montreal: Toe Blake; Detroit: Jimmy Skinner
- Captains: Montreal: Emile Bouchard; Detroit: Ted Lindsay
- Dates: March 31 – April 10, 1956
- Series-winning goal: Maurice Richard (15:08, second)
- Hall of Famers: Canadiens: Jean Beliveau (1972); Emile Bouchard (1966); Bernie Geoffrion (1972); Doug Harvey (1973); Tom Johnson (1970); Dickie Moore (1974); Bert Olmstead (1985); Jacques Plante (1978); Henri Richard (1979); Maurice Richard (1961); Red Wings: Johnny Bucyk (1981); Murray Costello (2005, builder); Alex Delvecchio (1977); Glenn Hall (1975); Gordie Howe (1972); Red Kelly (1969); Ted Lindsay (1966); Marcel Pronovost (1978); Norm Ullman (1982); Coaches: Toe Blake (1966, player); Officials: George Hayes (1988); Red Storey (1967); Frank Udvari (1973)

The 1956 Stanley Cup Final was the championship series of the National Hockey League's (NHL) 1955–56 season, and the culmination of the 1956 Stanley Cup playoffs. It was contested between the Montreal Canadiens and the two-time defending Stanley Cup champion Detroit Red Wings in the fourth Detroit-Montreal series in the 1950s. The two teams met in the previous two years as well as in 1952; with Detroit winning all three. The Canadiens were appearing in their sixth consecutive Finals, the Red Wings their third. The Canadiens avenged their previous three losses to Detroit, as they defeated the Red Wings in five games to win their second Stanley Cup in four years, denying the Red Wings a three-peat.

The Canadiens' victory marked the start of what was 16 consecutive Stanley Cup championships for Canadian-based teams when facing American-based teams, until the New York Islanders broke the streak in 1982.

== Paths to the Finals ==
Montreal defeated the New York Rangers 4–1 to reach the final. Detroit defeated the Toronto Maple Leafs 4–1 to reach the final.

== Game summaries ==
The Canadiens won the series in 5 games to win their eighth Stanley Cup. Jacques Plante held the Red Wings to just 9 goals in the five games. This was the first Final for Henri Richard and former Habs player Toe Blake's first Final as coach, who was the last to win the Stanley Cup as both a player and coach for the same team until Rod Brind'Amour did so in 2026.

=== Game one ===
March 31	Detroit Red Wings	4–6	Montreal Canadiens	Montreal Forum	Recap

The Canadiens, down 4–2 after two periods, scored four unanswered goals, in a 5:29 span, in the third period to win game one 6–4 at the Forum.

Scoring summary
Period	Team	Goal	Assist(s)	Time	Score
1st	DET	Alex Delvecchio (5) – pp	Earl Reibel (2) and Gordie Howe (5)	08:17	1–0 DET
2nd	MTL	Jean Beliveau (6) – pp	Bert Olmstead (3)	03:00	1–1
2nd	DET	Bill Dineen (1)	Norm Ullman (3) and Johnny Bucyk (1)	03:45	2–1 DET
2nd	MTL	Henri Richard (3)	Maurice Richard (8) and Dickie Moore (4)	06:40	2–2
2nd	DET	Ted Lindsay (5)	Gordie Howe (6)	08:11	3–2 DET
2nd	DET	Alex Delvecchio (6) – pp	Gordie Howe (7) and Lorne Ferguson (2)	11:20	4–2 DET
3rd	MTL	Jack LeClair (1)	Floyd Curry (3) and Doug Harvey (4)	05:20	4–3 DET
3rd	MTL	Bernie Geoffrion (3)	Jean-Guy Talbot (2)	06:20	4–4
3rd	MTL	Jean Beliveau (7)	Bernie Geoffrion (7) and Bert Olmstead (4)	07:31	5–4 MTL
3rd	MTL	Claude Provost (3)	Jack LeClair (1) and Floyd Curry (4)	10:49	6–4 MTL
Penalty summary
Period	Team	Player	Penalty	Time	PIM
1st	DET	Ted Lindsay	High-sticking	02:13	2:00
1st	MTL	Jean Beliveau	High-sticking	02:13	2:00
1st	DET	Bill Dineen	Roughing	03:21	2:00
1st	MTL	Bob Turner	High-sticking	03:21	2:00
1st	MTL	Maurice Richard	High-sticking	04:44	2:00
1st	DET	Gordie Howe	Hooking	05:45	2:00
1st	MTL	Maurice Richard	Hooking	08:02	2:00
1st	DET	Bill Dineen	Interference	13:18	2:00
1st	MTL	Maurice Richard	Hooking	14:32	2:00
1st	DET	Norm Ullman	Charging	15:35	2:00
2nd	DET	Metro Prystai	Kneeing	01:10	2:00
2nd	MTL	Tom Johnson	Cross-checking	11:13	2:00
2nd	DET	Bucky Hollingworth	Roughing	16:29	2:00
2nd	MTL	Tom Johnson	Roughing	16:29	2:00
3rd	None				

Shots by period
Team	1	2	3	Total
Detroit	10	12	5	27
Montreal	8	18	18	44

=== Game two ===
April 3	Detroit Red Wings	1–5	Montreal Canadiens	Montreal Forum	Recap

After a tight first period in game two, Montreal took control in the second, with goals from Henri Richard and Bernie Geoffrion, making the score 3–0. Jean Beliveau scored at 02:48 of the second period to make it 4-1, and Maurice Richard added a third-period goal with 39 seconds remaining, taking game two by a score of 5–1, giving Montreal a 2–0 series lead.

Scoring summary
Period	Team	Goal	Assist(s)	Time	Score
1st	MTL	Donnie Marshall (1) – sh	Bert Olmstead (5)	07:23	1–0 MTL
2nd	MTL	Henri Richard (4)	Dickie Moore (5)	11:37	2–0 MTL
2nd	MTL	Bernie Geoffrion (4)	Bert Olmstead (6) and Jean Beliveau (5)	14:38	3–0 MTL
3rd	DET	Norm Ullman (1)	Gordie Howe (8) and Ted Lindsay (1)	00:31	3–1 MTL
3rd	MTL	Jean Beliveau (8)	Maurice Richard (9) and Bert Olmstead (7)	02:48	4–1 MTL
3rd	MTL	Maurice Richard (4)	Henri Richard (9) and Dickie Moore (6)	19:21	5–1 MTL
Penalty summary
Period	Team	Player	Penalty	Time	PIM
1st	DET	Lorne Ferguson	High-sticking	03:34	2:00
1st	MTL	Tom Johnson	Roughing	03:34	2:00
1st	MTL	Floyd Curry	Hooking	07:02	2:00
1st	DET	Marty Pavelich	Cross-checking	09:30	2:00
1st	MTL	Tom Johnson	Cross-checking	17:02	2:00
2nd	DET	Lorne Ferguson	Holding	02:20	2:00
2nd	MTL	Dickie Moore	Hooking	07:24	2:00
2nd	DET	Marty Pavelich	Hooking	08:30	2:00
2nd	DET	Norm Ullman	Slashing	15:52	2:00
2nd	MTL	Bob Turner	High-sticking	15:52	2:00
3rd	DET	Marty Pavelich	High-sticking	05:29	2:00
3rd	MTL	Dickie Moore	Charging	09:29	2:00
3rd	MTL	Maurice Richard	Spearing	19:52	2:00

Shots by period
Team	1	2	3	Total
Detroit	7	5	8	20
Montreal	11	13	11	35

=== Game three ===
April 5	Montreal Canadiens	1–3	Detroit Red Wings	Olympia Stadium	Recap

In game three, with Detroit having home ice advantage, defeated Montreal by a score of 3-1, with goals from Red Kelly, Ted Lindsay, and Gordie Howe, cutting the Canadiens series lead in half.

Scoring summary
Period	Team	Goal	Assist(s)	Time	Score
1st	DET	Red Kelly (2) – pp	Gordie Howe (9)	14:27	1–0 DET
1st	MTL	Jean Beliveau (9)	Claude Provost (2)	19:20	1–1
2nd	None				
3rd	DET	Ted Lindsay (6)	Marty Pavelich (1) and Al Arbour (1)	11:36	2–1 DET
3rd	DET	Gordie Howe (3)	Ted Lindsay (2) and Alex Delvecchio (3)	18:12	3–1 DET
Penalty summary
Period	Team	Player	Penalty	Time	PIM
1st	DET	Lorne Ferguson	Interference	01:44	2:00
1st	MTL	Jack LeClair	Holding	04:31	2:00
1st	DET	Johnny Bucyk	Tripping	10:31	2:00
1st	DET	Ted Lindsay	High-sticking	11:25	2:00
1st	MTL	Jean Beliveau	High-sticking	11:25	2:00
1st	MTL	Jean-Guy Talbot	Holding	13:41	2:00
1st	DET	Earl Reibel	Roughing	19:06	2:00
1st	MTL	Bert Olmstead	Roughing	19:06	2:00
2nd	DET	Marty Pavelich	Elbowing	04:43	2:00
2nd	MTL	Maurice Richard	Interference	06:24	2:00
3rd	DET	Bob Goldham	Tripping	04:21	2:00
3rd	MTL	Bert Olmstead	Roughing	05:59	2:00
3rd	MTL	Jack LeClair	Tripping	13:22	2:00

Shots by period
Team	1	2	3	Total
Montreal	6	8	7	21
Detroit	5	8	12	25

=== Game four ===
April 8	Montreal Canadiens	3–0	Detroit Red Wings	Olympia Stadium	Recap

Jacques Plante recorded a shutout in game four, stopping all 24 shots he faced, while Jean Beliveau scored twice, giving the Canadiens a 3–0 victory and a 3–1 series lead.

Scoring summary
Period	Team	Goal	Assist(s)	Time	Score
1st	MTL	Jean Beliveau (10)	Doug Harvey (4) and Bert Olmstead (8)	15:52	1–0 MTL
2nd	MTL	Jean Beliveau (11)	Bernie Geoffrion (8) and Bert Olmstead (9)	11:39	2–0 MTL
3rd	MTL	Floyd Curry (1)	Claude Provost (3) and Ken Mosdell (1)	11:34	3–0 MTL
Penalty summary
Period	Team	Player	Penalty	Time	PIM
1st	DET	Metro Prystai	Tripping	00:50	2:00
1st	MTL	Bernie Geoffrion	Charging	01:47	2:00
1st	MTL	Floyd Curry	Hooking	08:57	2:00
1st	DET	Norm Ullman	Roughing	14:03	2:00
1st	DET	Norm Ullman	Fighting – major	14:03	5:00
1st	MTL	Henri Richard	Roughing	14:03	2:00
1st	MTL	Henri Richard	Fighting – major	14:03	5:00
2nd	DET	Johnny Bucyk	Roughing	04:04	2:00
2nd	MTL	Henri Richard	Tripping	04:12	2:00
2nd	DET	Lorne Ferguson	High-sticking	04:44	2:00
2nd	MTL	Jean Beliveau	High-sticking	04:44	2:00
2nd	MTL	Doug Harvey	Kneeing	06:24	2:00
2nd	MTL	Dickie Moore	Hooking	15:47	2:00
3rd	None				

Shots by period
Team	1	2	3	Total
Montreal	8	11	11	30
Detroit	6	9	9	24

=== Game five ===
April 10	Detroit Red Wings	1–3	Montreal Canadiens	Montreal Forum	Recap

In game five, Montreal defeated Detroit by a score of 3–1 in front of their home crowd to win their fifth consecutive Stanley Cup. Jean Beliveau starred with a goal and two assists, supported by goals from Maurice Richard and Bernie Geoffrion, while Jacques Plante made 25 saves.

Scoring summary
Period	Team	Goal	Assist(s)	Time	Score
1st	None				
2nd	MTL	Jean Beliveau (12) – pp	Floyd Curry (5) and Doug Harvey (5)	14:16	1–0 MTL
2nd	MTL	Maurice Richard (5) – pp	Bernie Geoffrion (9) and Jean Beliveau (6)	15:08	2–0 MTL
3rd	MTL	Bernie Geoffrion (5)	Jean Beliveau (7) and Bert Olmstead (10)	00:13	3–0 MTL
3rd	DET	Alex Delvecchio (7)	Ted Lindsay (3)	00:35	3–1 MTL
Penalty summary
Period	Team	Player	Penalty	Time	PIM
1st	DET	Larry Hillman	Elbowing	02:48	2:00
1st	MTL	Claude Provost	Slashing	06:42	2:00
1st	MTL	Henri Richard	Hooking	09:35	2:00
1st	DET	Gordie Howe	Charging	10:47	2:00
1st	MTL	Doug Harvey	Slashing	10:47	2:00
2nd	MTL	Doug Harvey	Holding	00:42	2:00
2nd	DET	Ted Lindsay	High-sticking	06:30	2:00
2nd	MTL	Jean Beliveau	High-sticking	06:30	2:00
2nd	MTL	Dollard St. Laurent	High-sticking	09:56	2:00
2nd	DET	Marcel Pronovost	Tripping	13:50	2:00
3rd	DET	Red Kelly	Tripping	07:07	2:00
3rd	MTL	Maurice Richard	Hooking	12:11	2:00

Shots by period
Team	1	2	3	Total
Detroit	7	10	9	26
Montreal	11	8	11	30

== Stanley Cup engraving ==
The 1956 Stanley Cup was presented to Canadiens captain Emile Bouchard by NHL President Clarence Campbell following the Canadiens 3–1 win over the Red Wings in game five.

The following Canadiens players and staff had their names engraved on the Stanley Cup

1955–56 Montreal Canadiens

=== Players ===
Centres

- 4 Jean Beliveau
- 8 Jack LeClair
- 16 Henri Richard
- 18 Ken Mosdell (A)

Wingers

- 5 Bernie Geoffrion
- 6 Floyd Curry
- 9 Maurice Richard (A)
- 12 Dickie Moore
- 14 Claude Provost
- 15 Bert Olmstead
- 22 Don Marshall

Defencemen

- 2 Doug Harvey (A)
- 3 Emile "Butch" Bouchard (Captain)
- 10 Tom Johnson
- 17 Jean-Guy Talbot
- 19 Dollard St. Laurent
- 24 Bob Turner

Goaltenders

- 1 Jacques Plante
- 1 Charlie Hodge (spare, did not play)

=== Coaching and administrative staff ===
- Donat Raymond (President/Owner), Frank Selke (Manager)
- Dalton Coleman (Vice President/Owner), William Northey (Vice Presidents/Owner)
- Ken Reardon (Asst. Manager), Toe Blake (Coach)
- Hector Dubois (Trainer)
- Gaston Bettez (Asst. Trainer)

=== Stanley Cup engraving ===
- Emile "Butch" Bouchard was engraved on the Stanley Cup in 1944, 1946 and 1953 as EMILE BOUCHARD. He was then engraved on the Stanley Cup as BUTCH BOUCHARD in 1956.
- Three engraving mistakes were made on the Stanley Cup. Bob Turner is listed as trainer when the Stanley Cup was redone in 1957–58, but he played defence. Hector Dubois and Gaston Bettez were the trainers, but no position was listed. Claude Provost's name was misspelled C. PREVOST with an "E" instead of an "O". Gaston Bettez was spelled wrong as G BETTEX when the Cup was redone in 1957–58 with an "X" instead of a "Z". His name was spelled correctly on the original ring as G. BETTEZ.
- Hector "Toe" Blake was the ninth rookie coach to win the Stanley Cup.
- Camile DesRoches and Frank Selke Jr. (Publicity Directors) were left off the Stanley Cup engraving, but included in the team picture.
- The 1956 Montreal Canadiens filled the last spot on the Stanley Cup. (See 1958 Stanley Cup Final change)

== See also ==
- 1955–56 NHL season

== Notes ==
Preceded by Detroit Red Wings; 1955	Montreal Canadiens; Stanley Cup champions 1956	Succeeded by Montreal Canadiens; 1957
