= Oxford Park =

Oxford Park may refer to:

- Oxford Park, Montreal, a park in the Notre-Dame-de-Grâce district in Montreal
- Oxford Park railway station, a stop on the Ferny Grove Line of Brisbane, Australia.
- Oxford parks, parks and gardens in Oxford, England
