= Donnie Marshall =

Canadian ice hockey player (1932–2024)

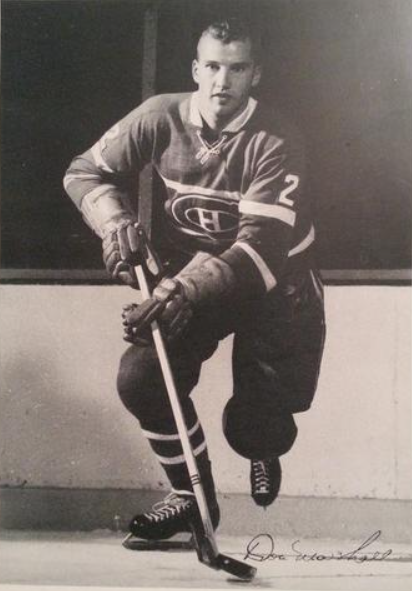
- Marshall with the Montreal Canadiens in 1960
- Born: March 23, 1932 Verdun, Quebec, Canada
- Died: October 8, 2024 (aged 92) Stuart, Florida, U.S.
- Height: 5 ft 10 in (178 cm)
- Weight: 160 lb (73 kg; 11 st 6 lb)
- Position: Left wing
- Shot: Left
- Played for: Montreal Canadiens; New York Rangers; Buffalo Sabres; Toronto Maple Leafs
- Playing career: 1952–1972

Donald Robert Marshall (March 23, 1932 – October 8, 2024) was a Canadian professional ice hockey player.

== Life and career ==
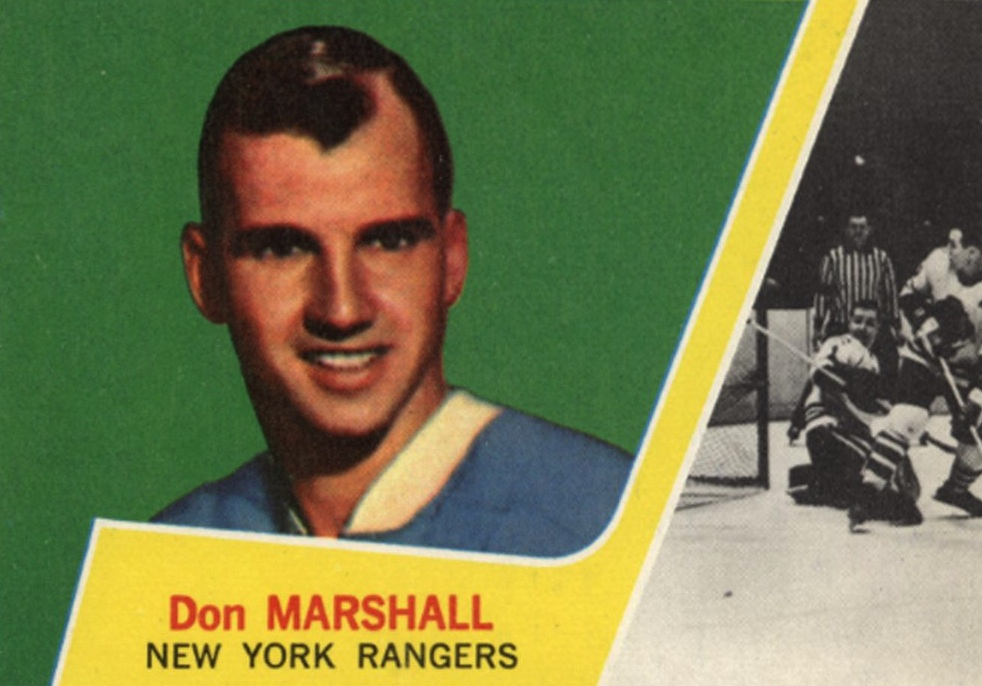
Marshall in 1963 Topps card

Marshall played in the National Hockey League (NHL) from 1951 to 1972 for the New York Rangers, Buffalo Sabres, Toronto Maple Leafs and Montreal Canadiens. Marshall was part of the 1950s Canadiens' dynasty that captured an NHL record five consecutive Stanley Cups from 1956 to 1960, playing mostly on the checking line with Phil Goyette and Claude Provost.

Marshall played 1176 career NHL games, scoring 265 goals and 324 assists for 589 points.

Marshall died from COVID-19 complications in Stuart, Florida, on October 8, 2024, at the age of 92. He was the last surviving Canadiens' 1956 Stanley Cup team member and the last surviving player out of the twelve to have played for all five Canadiens teams during their five straight championships.

== Legacy ==
- Ranked No. 75 all-time of the 901 New York Rangers who had played during the team's first 82 seasons, in the 2009 book 100 Ranger Greats

== Career statistics ==
=== Regular season and playoffs ===
			Regular season					Playoffs
Season	Team	League	GP	G	A	Pts	PIM	GP	G	A	Pts	PIM
1949–50	Montreal Jr. Canadiens	QJHL	35	8	7	15	10	16	1	4	5	4
1949–50	Montreal Jr. Canadiens	M-Cup	—	—	—	—	—	13	8	6	14	2
1950–51	Montreal Jr. Canadiens	QJHL	37	19	32	51	6	9	5	8	13	0
1951–52	Montreal Jr. Canadiens	QJHL	32	32	46	78	6	11	4	5	9	6
1951–52	Montreal Canadiens	NHL	1	0	0	0	0	—	—	—	—	—
1951–52	Montreal Jr. Canadiens	M-Cup	—	—	—	—	—	8	6	5	11	8
1952–53	Cincinnati Mohawks	IHL	60	46	51	97	24	9	5	5	10	0
1952–53	Montreal Royals	QHL	2	0	0	0	2	—	—	—	—	—
1953–54	Buffalo Bisons	AHL	70	39	55	94	8	3	1	4	5	0
1954–55	Montreal Canadiens	NHL	39	5	3	8	9	12	1	1	2	2
1954–55	Montreal Royals	QHL	10	5	3	8	2	—	—	—	—	—
1955–56	Montreal Canadiens	NHL	66	4	1	5	10	10	1	0	1	0
1956–57	Montreal Canadiens	NHL	70	12	8	20	6	10	1	3	4	2
1957–58	Montreal Canadiens	NHL	68	22	19	41	14	10	0	2	2	4
1958–59	Montreal Canadiens	NHL	70	10	22	32	12	11	0	2	2	2
1959–60	Montreal Canadiens	NHL	70	16	22	38	4	8	2	2	4	0
1960–61	Montreal Canadiens	NHL	70	14	17	31	8	6	0	2	2	0
1961–62	Montreal Canadiens	NHL	66	18	28	46	12	6	0	1	1	2
1962–63	Montreal Canadiens	NHL	65	13	20	33	6	5	0	0	0	0
1963–64	New York Rangers	NHL	70	11	12	23	8	—	—	—	—	—
1964–65	New York Rangers	NHL	69	20	15	35	2	—	—	—	—	—
1965–66	New York Rangers	NHL	69	26	28	54	6	—	—	—	—	—
1966–67	New York Rangers	NHL	70	24	22	46	4	4	0	1	1	2
1967–68	New York Rangers	NHL	70	19	30	49	2	6	2	1	3	0
1968–69	New York Rangers	NHL	74	20	19	39	12	4	1	0	1	0
1969–70	New York Rangers	NHL	57	9	15	24	6	1	0	0	0	0
1970–71	Buffalo Sabres	NHL	62	20	29	49	6	—	—	—	—	—
1971–72	Toronto Maple Leafs	NHL	50	2	14	16	0	1	0	0	0	0
NHL totals			1,176	265	324	589	127	94	8	15	23	14

== Awards and honours ==
- NHL Second All-Star team – 1967
- Stanley Cup champion – 1956, 1957, 1958, 1959, 1960
- Played in NHL All-Star Game – 1956, 1957, 1958, 1959, 1960, 1961, 1968

== See also ==
- List of NHL players with 1,000 games played
