= Stanley Cup Final =

National Hockey League championship series

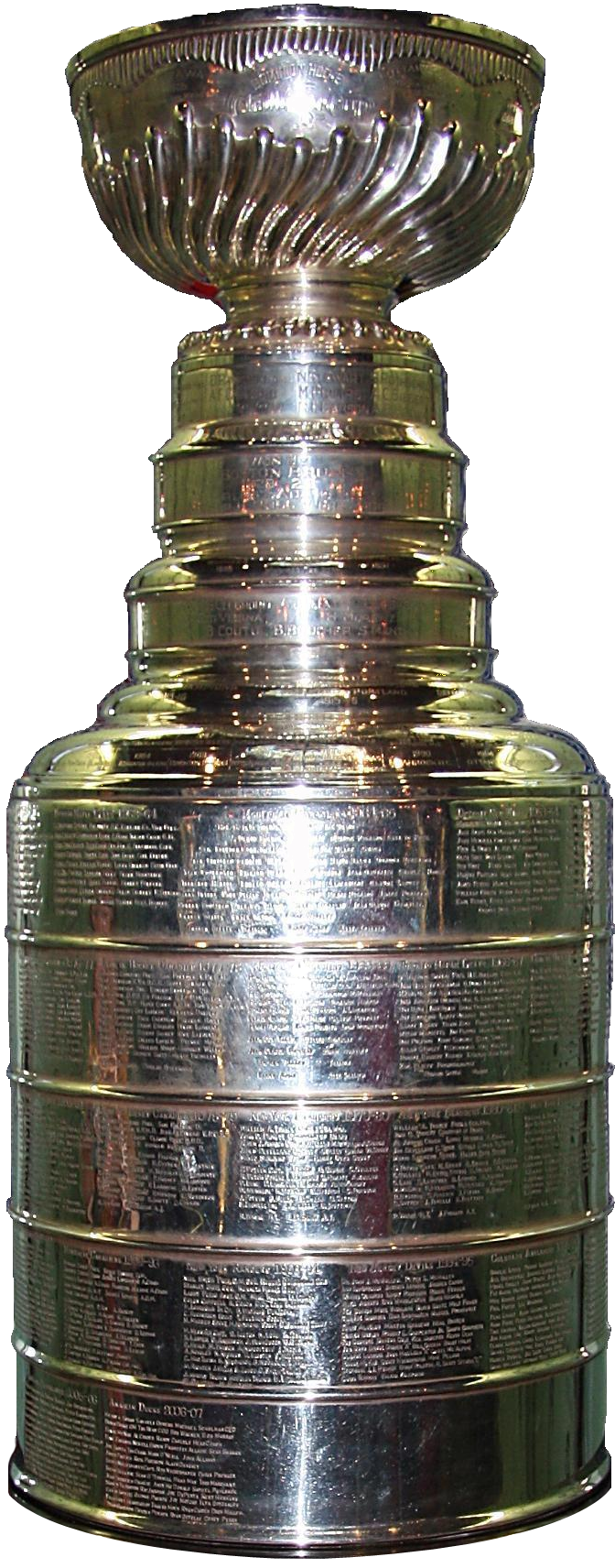
- The Stanley Cup, the trophy awarded annually to the winner of the Stanley Cup Final

Tournament information
- Sport: Ice hockey
- Month played: Late May–June
- Established: 1914 (Note: See List of Stanley Cup challenge games for Stanley Cup champions earlier than 1914)
- Administrator: National Hockey League (1927–present)
- Format: Best-of-seven series
- Teams: 2
- Defending champions: Carolina Hurricanes (2nd title)
- Most championships: Montreal Canadiens (24 titles)
- Broadcast: Canada: Sportsnet/Sportsnet+; TVA Sports (French); United States: ABC/ESPN app (even-numbered years); TNT/HBO Max (odd-numbered years)

Most recent tournament
- 2026 Stanley Cup Final

The Stanley Cup Final in ice hockey (also known as the Stanley Cup Finals; French: Finale de la Coupe Stanley) is the annual championship series of the National Hockey League (NHL). The winner is awarded the Stanley Cup, North America's oldest professional sports trophy, and one of the "most important championships available to the sport [of ice hockey]" according to the International Ice Hockey Federation.

Originally inscribed the Dominion Hockey Challenge Cup, the trophy was donated in 1892 by Lord Stanley of Preston, governor general of Canada, initially as a "challenge trophy" for Canada's top-ranking amateur ice hockey club. The champions held onto the Cup until they either lost their league title to another club, or a champion from another league issued a formal challenge and defeated the reigning Cup champion in a final game to claim their win.

Professional teams first became eligible to challenge for the Stanley Cup in 1906. Starting in 1915, the Cup was officially held between the champion of the National Hockey Association (NHA) and the champion of the Pacific Coast Hockey Association (PCHA). After a series of league mergers and folds, it became the championship trophy of the NHL in 1926. Starting in 1982, the championship round of the NHL's playoffs has been a best-of-seven series played between the champions of the Eastern and Western Conferences. Since then, Western champions have won 21 times, while the Eastern champions have won 20 times.

== History ==
The Stanley Cup was first awarded to the Montreal Hockey Club in 1893 when the team won the 1893 AHAC season. The team then had to defend its champion-title both through league championships and challenge games organised by the Stanley Cup trustees. Until 1912, these challenges could take place before or during a league season. After 1912, the trustees ordered that challenges only take place after all league games were completed.

The last challenge, in 1914, was the inauguration of the first "World Series" of ice hockey, a series between the Stanley Cup and league champion Toronto Hockey Club of the National Hockey Association (NHA) and the Victoria Aristocrats, champions of the Pacific Coast Hockey Association (PCHA). The series was pre-arranged between the two leagues before the season after post-season exhibitions held in their previous seasons. The inaugural series was to be held in the city of the NHA champion, and alternate annually following the series.

After the series got under way, there was some concern that the series would not produce an "official" Stanley Cup champion. The Victoria club had not formally applied to the Stanley Cup trustees to challenge for the Cup. A letter arrived from the Stanley Cup trustees on March 17, that the trustees would not let the Stanley Cup travel west, because they did not consider Victoria a proper challenger, as they had not verified themselves with the trustees. However, on March 18, trustee William Foran stated that it was a misunderstanding. PCHA president Lester Patrick, had not filed a challenge, because he had expected Emmett Quinn of the NHA to make all of the arrangements in his role as hockey commissioner, whereas the trustees thought they were being purposely ignored. The Victoria challenge was accepted. Any tension was diffused as Toronto successfully defended the Cup by sweeping a best-of-five series in three games. This began the end of the influence of the Stanley Cup trustees on the challengers and series for the Cup. In March 1914, trustee William Foran wrote to NHA president Emmett Quinn that the trustees are "perfectly satisfied to allow the representatives of the three pro leagues (NHA, PCHA and Maritime) to make all arrangements each season as to the series of matches to be played for the Cup."

Part of their 1913 agreement to set up drafting and player rights ownership, the NHA and PCHA agreed to have their respective champions face each other for the Cup. At the same time, the NHA concluded a similar agreement with the Maritime Hockey League but the MHL champions abandoned their 1914 challenge and did not challenge again. From 1914 onwards, the Stanley Cup championship finals alternated between the East and the West each year, with alternating games played according to NHA and PCHA rules. The Cup trustees agreed to this new arrangement, because after the Allan Cup became the highest prize for amateur hockey teams in Canada, the trustees had become dependent on the top two professional leagues to bolster the prominence of the trophy. After the Portland Rosebuds, an American-based team, joined the PCHA in 1914, the trustees issued a statement that the Cup was no longer for the best team in Canada, but now for the best team in the world. Two years later, the Rosebuds became the first American team to play in the Stanley Cup championship finals. In 1917, the Seattle Metropolitans became the first American team to win the Cup. After that season, the NHA dissolved, and the National Hockey League (NHL) took its place.

In 1919, the Spanish influenza epidemic forced the Montreal Canadiens and the Seattle Metropolitans to cancel their series tied at 2–2–1, marking the first time the Stanley Cup was not awarded.

The format for the Stanley Cup championship changed in 1922, with the creation of the Western Canada Hockey League (WCHL). Now three leagues competed for the Cup and this necessitated a semi-final series between two league champions, with the third having a bye directly to the finals. In 1924, the PCHA and the WCHL merged to form the Western Hockey League (WHL) and the championship reverted to a single series. After winning in the 1924–25 season, the Victoria Cougars became the last team outside the NHL to win the Stanley Cup.

The WHL folded in 1926, and most of the players moved to the NHL. This left the NHL as the only league left competing for the Cup. Other leagues and clubs have issued challenges, but from that year forward, no non-NHL team has played for it, leading it to become the de facto championship trophy of the NHL. In 1947, the NHL reached an agreement with trustees P. D. Ross and Cooper Smeaton to grant control of the cup to the NHL, allowing the league itself to reject challenges from other leagues that may have wished to play for the Cup. A 2006 Ontario Superior Court case found that the trustees had gone against Lord Stanley's conditions in the 1947 agreement. The NHL has agreed to allow other teams to play for the Cup should the league not be operating, as was the case in the 2004–05 NHL lockout.

=== Broadcasting ===
The first television broadcast of the Stanley Cup Final in Canada was in 1953. English-language coverage was aired by the Canadian Broadcasting Corporation (CBC), with Danny Gallivan calling the play-by-play, Keith Dancy providing the colour commentary, and Wes McKnight hosted. The Hockey Night in Canada team of Gallivan and Dancy called the next eight finals. Gallivan called his last championship series in 1978. For decades, Hockey Night in Canada on CBC remained the exclusive English-language broadcaster across Canada, except in 1972 when a lengthy NABET strike forced coverage to be instead aired on CTV, and from 1985 to 1988 when the series was split between CBC and either CTV or Global TV. In 2015, the CBC telecast became a Rogers Media-produced broadcast under a sub-license agreement, with it streaming on Rogers Media's digital platform, and a simulcast on Sportsnet starting in 2017. CBC did not renew the sub-license agreement with Sportsnet after the 2026 series, marking the end of 74 consecutive years that the public broadcaster televised the Final.

French-language broadcasts in Canada also began in 1953, with play-by-play commentator Rene Lecavalier and colour commentator Jean-Maurice Bailly on CBC's Télévision de Radio-Canada (SRC) division. SRC continued to be the exclusive French-language broadcaster until 2003 when Réseau des sports (RDS) took over. Since 2015, under a sub-license agreement with Rogers, TVA has been the exclusive home of French-language broadcasts in Canada.

The first television broadcast in the United States was in 1962, covered by local Chicago station WGN, while network broadcasts started in 1966 on NBC. However, national coverage on American television, like the rest of the NHL season, remained in a state of flux for decades. From 1966 to 1975, NBC and CBS held the rights at various times, but they each only covered selected games of the series. It was then carried on syndication from 1976 to 1979 through the 1970s NHL Network. In 1980, the Hughes broadcast network simulcast CBC's feed before the series was moved to cable. During its time on cable from 1980 to 1993, rights to the series was held at various times by USA, SportsChannel America, and ESPN, but there was no exclusive coverage of games and thus local broadcasters could also still televise them regionally as well. In 1995, Fox signed on to be the exclusive national broadcast network of selected games of the final round, splitting it with ESPN. This splitting of exclusive national coverage between a cable and a broadcast network was then passed to ABC and ESPN in 2000, and then NBC and Versus (now NBCSN) in 2006. Since 2022, the series has been rotated annually between ABC in even years and the cable channel TNT in odd years (with the option for simulcasts on their respective sister cable networks or streaming platforms).

==== Timeline of national broadcasters ====
Canada			United States		
Year	English language	French language	Year	National broadcaster(s)	Local/national coverage policy
1953	CBC	SRC	1953	None	
1966	CBC	SRC	1966	NBC (Games 1 and 4), RKO General (Game 6)	Local coverage permitted for non-network games. National network telecasts exclusive.
1967	CBC	SRC	1967	CBS (Selected games only)	Local coverage permitted for non-network games. National network telecasts exclusive.
1972	CTV	SRC	1972	CBS (Selected games only)	Local coverage permitted for non-network games. National network telecasts exclusive.
1973	CBC	SRC	1973	NBC (Selected games only)	Local coverage permitted for non-network games. National network telecasts exclusive.
1976	CBC	SRC	1976	NHL Network	National coverage on syndicated network exclusive, with local announcers of participating U.S. teams being used only in the participating team's markets.
1980	CBC	SRC	1980	Hughes (Games 1–5), CBS (Game 6)	National coverage on syndicated network exclusive, with local announcers of participating U.S. teams being used only in the participating team's markets.
1981	CBC	SRC	1981	USA	Local coverage permitted for all games. National coverage (cable) not exclusive.
1985	Split between CBC and CTV	SRC	1985	USA	Local coverage permitted for all games. National coverage (cable) not exclusive.
1986	Split between CBC and CTV	SRC	1986	ESPN	Local coverage permitted for all games. National coverage (cable) not exclusive.
1987	Split between CBC and Global	SRC	1987	ESPN	Local coverage permitted for all games. National coverage (cable) not exclusive.
1989	CBC	SRC	1989	SportsChannel America	Local coverage permitted for all games. National coverage (cable) not exclusive.
1993	CBC	SRC	1993	ESPN	Local coverage permitted for all games. National coverage (cable) not exclusive.
1995	CBC	SRC	1995	Split between Fox and ESPN	National coverage (network and cable) exclusive.
2000	CBC	SRC	2000	Split between ABC and ESPN	National coverage (network and cable) exclusive.
2003	CBC	RDS	2003	Split between ABC and ESPN	National coverage (network and cable) exclusive.
2006	CBC	RDS	2006	Split between NBC and OLN/VS/NBCSN	National coverage (network and cable) exclusive.
2015	CBC, produced by Rogers Sportsnet	TVA	2015	Split between NBC and OLN/VS/NBCSN	National coverage (network and cable) exclusive.
2017	CBC/Sportsnet simulcast	TVA	2017	Split between NBC and OLN/VS/NBCSN	National coverage (network and cable) exclusive.
2022	CBC/Sportsnet simulcast	TVA	2022	Rotated annually between ABC in even years and TNT/TruTV simulcast in odd years	National coverage (network and cable) exclusive.
2027	Sportsnet	TVA	2027	Rotated annually between ABC in even years and TNT/TruTV simulcast in odd years	National coverage (network and cable) exclusive.

== Series format ==
The championship series began with the interleague "World Series" played in one city. The series alternated between a rink of the NHA and later the NHL and a rink of the PCHA and later the WCHL/WHL. It was not until the demise of the WHL that the final series alternated games between the two finalists' home ice.

The series allowed ties until 1928. As the two and later three leagues differed, the series would alternate using each league's rules. The PCHA continued to use seven-man team play, and games would alternate with six- and seven-man games.

After the NHL became the last remaining league to compete for the Cup, the trophy was then awarded to the winner of the NHL's championship playoff round. This first took place in 1927 between the Boston Bruins and the Ottawa Senators, which was planned to be a best-of-three series, although the series allowed ties. The series ended after four games, when the Senators defeated the Bruins in the fourth game.

The NHL has changed its playoff format several times since 1927, and thus the final round has not always pitted conference or division playoff champions against each other. In the playoff format used from 1929 to 1938, the two teams with identical division ranking would face each other (i.e. the first-place teams played each other, the second-place teams played each other, and likewise for the third-place teams). The winner of the first-place series would automatically advance to the final round. The winners of the second- and third-place series would then play each other, with the winner of that series earning the other berth in the championship round.

During the Original Six era, the top four teams made the playoffs, with the first- and third-place teams battling in one semifinal series, while the second- and fourth-place teams battled in the other. And from 1975 to 1981, all the playoff teams were seeded regardless of division or conference. From 1982 to 2020, the NHL's final round pitted the league's two conference playoff champions. In 2021, the league temporarily realigned due to the COVID-19 pandemic. As a result, the four playoff division champions were re-seeded and played in the semifinals, with the winners of those series advancing to the Final. The league then returned to the previous conference-based playoff format in 2022.

Years	Format	Participants	Notes
1914–1917	best-of-five	NHA champion vs. PCHA champion	
1918–1921	best-of-five	NHL champion vs. PCHA champion	1919 series cancelled after the fifth game because of the flu epidemic.
1922	best-of-five	With three leagues (the NHL, the PCHA, and the WCHL) competing for the Cup, a semifinal series was held between two league champions, with the third having a bye directly to the Cup Final.	
1923–1924	best-of-three	With three leagues (the NHL, the PCHA, and the WCHL) competing for the Cup, a semifinal series was held between two league champions, with the third having a bye directly to the Cup Final.	
1925–1926	best-of-five	NHL champion vs. WCHL/WHL champion	The WCHL was renamed the WHL before the 1925–26 season.
1927	best-of-three	American Division vs. Canadian Division playoff champions	Ties allowed, series ended in four games. First season that the Cup was solely contested by the NHL.
1928	best-of-five	American Division vs. Canadian Division playoff champions	
1929–1930	best-of-three	The two divisional first-place teams played each other for one berth in the Cup Final, while the other playoff teams competed in a series of rounds for the other berth in the Cup Final.	
1931–1938	best-of-five	The two divisional first-place teams played each other for one berth in the Cup Final, while the other playoff teams competed in a series of rounds for the other berth in the Cup Final.	
1939–1942	best-of-seven	The top two seeds played each other for one berth in the Cup Final, while the other four playoff teams battled in a series of rounds for the other berth.	Period of the seven-team NHL
1943–1967	best-of-seven	The first and third-place teams played for one berth in the Cup Final, while the second and fourth-place teams played for the other berth.	The "Original Six" era.
1968–1970	best-of-seven	East Division vs. West Division playoff champions	
1971–1974	best-of-seven	The league used playoff formats that ensured that both Cup semifinals were inter-division match-ups.	
1975–1981	best-of-seven	Playoff teams were seeded regardless of division or conference, with the last two remaining teams playing in the Final.	
1982–2020	best-of-seven	Wales/Eastern Conference vs. Campbell/Western Conference playoff champions	2004–05 season canceled due to lockout.
2021	best-of-seven	The COVID-19 pandemic and closure of the Canada–United States border forced the league to temporarily realign the teams in three US-based divisions and one Canadian division to limit travel. The top four teams in each division played each other with the winners of those games advancing to the divisional round. The four divisional playoff champions were then re-seeded by regular season points in the Stanley Cup semifinals. The winners of the semifinals played each other in the Stanley Cup Final.	
2022–present	best-of-seven	Eastern Conference vs. Western Conference playoff champions	

== Champions ==
Most recent Final appearances (last five)
Year	Winning team	Coach	Losing team	Coach	Result	Series-winning goal
2022	Colorado Avalanche (WC)	Jared Bednar	Tampa Bay Lightning (EC)	Jon Cooper	4–2	Artturi Lehkonen (12:28, second)
2023	Vegas Golden Knights (WC)	Bruce Cassidy	Florida Panthers (EC)	Paul Maurice	4–1	Reilly Smith (12:13, second)
2024	Florida Panthers (EC)	Paul Maurice	Edmonton Oilers (WC)	Kris Knoblauch	4–3	Sam Reinhart (15:11, second)
2025	Florida Panthers (EC)	Paul Maurice	Edmonton Oilers (WC)	Kris Knoblauch	4–2	Matthew Tkachuk (19:13, first)
2026	Carolina Hurricanes (EC)	Rod Brind'Amour	Vegas Golden Knights (WC)	John Tortorella	4–2	Taylor Hall (3:47, first)

Most Final appearances (top five) (Bold indicates Cup wins)
Appearances	Team	Wins	Losses	Win %	Years of appearance
35^{[3]}	Montreal Canadiens (NHA/NHL)	24	10	.686	**1916**, 1917, 1919^{[3]}, **1924**, 1925, **1930**, **1931**, **1944**, **1946**, 1947, 1951, 1952, **1953**, 1954, 1955, **1956**, **1957**, **1958**, **1959**, **1960**, **1965**, **1966**, 1967, **1968**, **1969**, **1971**, **1973**, **1976**, **1977**, **1978**, **1979**, **1986**, 1989, **1993**, 2021
24	Detroit Red Wings	11	13	.458	1934, **1936**, **1937**, 1941, 1942, **1943**, 1945, 1948, 1949, **1950**, **1952**, **1954**, **1955**, 1956, 1961, 1963, 1964, 1966, 1995, **1997**, **1998**, **2002**, **2008**, 2009
21	Toronto Maple Leafs^{[1]}	13	8	.619	**1918**, **1922**, **1932**, 1933, 1935, 1936, 1938, 1939, 1940, **1942**, **1945**, **1947**, **1948**, **1949**, **1951**, 1959, 1960, **1962**, **1963**, **1964**, **1967**
20	Boston Bruins	6	14	.300	1927, **1929**, 1930, **1939**, **1941**, 1943, 1946, 1953, 1957, 1958, **1970**, **1972**, 1974, 1977, 1978, 1988, 1990, **2011**, 2013, 2019
13	Chicago Blackhawks^{[2]}	6	7	.462	1931, **1934**, **1938**, 1944, **1961**, 1962, 1965, 1971, 1973, 1992, **2010**, **2013**, **2015**

Notes

1. The NHL includes the Toronto Hockey Club (Toronto Arenas) 1918 win and the 1922 Toronto St. Patricks win in the Toronto Maple Leafs total.
2. The Chicago Blackhawks were known as the Chicago Black Hawks before the 1986–87 season.
3. The Montreal Canadiens totals include the 1919 Final that ended with a no-decision because of the Spanish flu epidemic.

== Records ==
=== Team ===
- Most wins: Montreal Canadiens (24)
- Most losses: Boston Bruins (14)
- Fewest losses: Colorado Avalanche (0)
- Most consecutive wins: Montreal Canadiens (5 in 1956–1960)
- Most consecutive losses: Toronto Maple Leafs (3 in 1938–1940), St. Louis Blues (3 in 1968–1970)
- Most consecutive appearances: Montreal Canadiens (10 in 1951–1960)
- Most consecutive appearances without a loss: Montreal Canadiens (9 from 1968 to 1986)
- Most consecutive appearances without a win: Toronto Maple Leafs (6 from 1933 to 1940), Detroit Red Wings (6 from 1956 to 1995), Philadelphia Flyers (6 from 1976 to 2010)
- Most seasons between wins: New York Rangers (54 between 1940 and 1994)
- Most seasons between appearances: Toronto Maple Leafs (58 between 1967–present, excluding 2004–05 season)

==== Stanley Cup Final consecutive appearances ====
Team	Appearance streak	Consecutive appearances	Wins during streak
Montreal Canadiens	10 seasons	1950–51 through to 1959–60	1952–53, 1955–56, 1956–57, 1957–58, 1958–59, 1959–60
Montreal Canadiens	5 seasons	1964–65 through to 1968–69	1964–65, 1965–66, 1967–68, 1968–69
New York Islanders	5 seasons	1979–80 through to 1983–84	1979–80, 1980–81, 1981–82, 1982–83
Montreal Canadiens	4 seasons	1975–76 through to 1978–79	1975–76, 1976–77, 1977–78, 1978–79
Toronto Maple Leafs	3 seasons	1937–38 through to 1939–40	none
Detroit Red Wings	3 seasons	1940–41 through to 1942–43	1942–43
Toronto Maple Leafs	3 seasons	1946–47 through to 1948–49	1946–47, 1947–48, 1948–49
Detroit Red Wings	3 seasons	1947–48 through to 1949–50	1949–50
Detroit Red Wings	3 seasons	1953–54 through to 1955–56	1953–54, 1954–55
Toronto Maple Leafs	3 seasons	1961–62 through to 1963–64	1961–62, 1962–63, 1963–64
St. Louis Blues	3 seasons	1967–68 through to 1969–70	none
Philadelphia Flyers	3 seasons	1973–74 through to 1975–76	1973–74, 1974–75
Edmonton Oilers	3 seasons	1982–83 through to 1984–85	1983–84, 1984–85
Tampa Bay Lightning	3 seasons	2019–20 through to 2021–22	2019–20, 2020–21
Florida Panthers	3 seasons	2022–23 through to 2024–25	2023–24, 2024–25

=== Individual ===
Career

- Most years in finals (12) - Maurice Richard, Red Kelly, Jean Beliveau, Henri Richard
- Most games played in finals (65) - Red Kelly, Henri Richard
- Most consecutive games in finals (53) - Bernie Geoffrion
- Most career points in finals (62) - Jean Beliveau
- Most career goals in finals (34) - Maurice Richard
- Most career assists in finals (35) - Wayne Gretzky
- Most career game-winning goals in finals (9) - Jean Beliveau
- Most career shutouts in finals (8) - Clint Benedict

Series

- Most points, one series (13) - Wayne Gretzky (1988)
- Most goals, one series (14) - Bernie Morris (1917) (Note: One of the above (most points, most goals) is incorrect, as 14 goals are also 14 points. The discrepancy seems to be whether the years before 1918 are included in NHL Stanley Cup history.)
- Most assists, one series (10) - Wayne Gretzky (1988)
- Most shutouts, one series (3) - Clint Benedict (1926), Frank McCool (1945), Martin Brodeur (2003)

== See also ==
- List of Stanley Cup champions
- List of Stanley Cup challenge games
- List of NHL franchise post-season droughts
- List of Stanley Cup Final sweeps
