= Sid Smith (ice hockey) =

Canadian ice hockey player

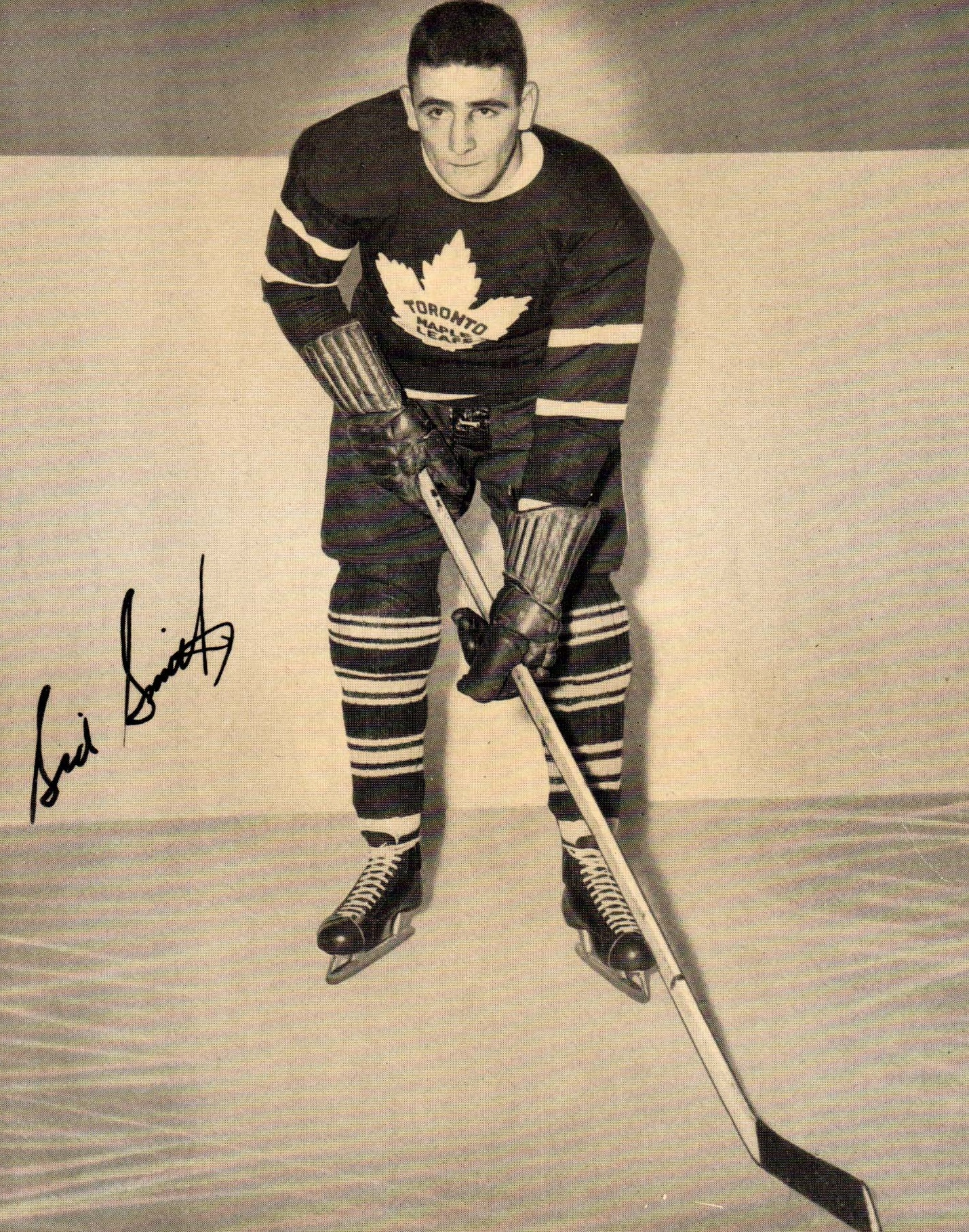
- Smith in the 1950s
- Born: July 11, 1925 Toronto, Ontario, Canada
- Died: April 29, 2004 (aged 78) Wasaga Beach, Ontario, Canada
- Height: 5 ft 10 in (178 cm)
- Weight: 173 lb (78 kg; 12 st 5 lb)
- Position: Left wing
- Shot: Left
- Played for: Toronto Maple Leafs
- Playing career: 1946–1958

Sidney James Smith (July 11, 1925 – April 29, 2004) was a National Hockey League left winger who played with the Toronto Maple Leafs for 12 seasons. He was the Leafs team captain from 1955 to 1956.

== Playing career ==
Born in Toronto, Ontario, and attended De La Salle College, Smith began his career in minor leagues in Toronto and later with the Oshawa Generals in the Ontario Hockey League. He attended Essex School and resided at 1 Burnfield Avenue in Seaton.

Having played 45 games in two championship seasons for the Maple Leafs, he spent most of the 1948–49 season in the AHL with the Pittsburgh Hornets before he was called back to Toronto. After playing just one regular season game Smith scored a hat-trick in game two of the Stanley Cup Final to help Toronto to a four-games sweep of the Detroit Red Wings. Smith had six consecutive seasons with 20 or more goals, a distinction held by the great Gordie Howe. Smith retired in the 1957–1958 season and later became a player-coach with the Whitby Dunlops, a senior team in the Ontario Hockey Association in 1957. Smith played 601 regular season games scoring 186 goals and 183 assists for 369 points. In 44 play-off games, he scored 17 goals and 10 assists for 27 points.

== Awards and achievements ==
- Three Stanley Cup championships 1947–48, 1948–49, 1950–51
- Two Lady Byng Trophies in 1951–52 and 1954–55.
- Selected for the second All-Star team in 1950–51 and 1951–52, and for the first All-Star team in 1954–55

== Career statistics ==
			Regular season					Playoffs
Season	Team	League	GP	G	A	Pts	PIM	GP	G	A	Pts	PIM
1943–44	De La Salle College	Big-10 Jr. B	9	1	1	2	2	9	4	2	6	8
1944–45	Oshawa Generals	OHA-Jr.	20	10	7	17	18	3	0	1	1	0
1944–45	Porcupine Combines	M-Cup	—	—	—	—	—	2	2	0	2	0
1945–46	Toronto Staffords	OHA-Sr.	13	9	12	21	2	10	6	7	13	0
1946–47	Quebec Aces	QSHL	15	12	5	17	6	—	—	—	—	—
1946–47	Toronto Maple Leafs	NHL	14	2	1	3	0	—	—	—	—	—
1947–48	Toronto Maple Leafs	NHL	31	7	10	17	10	2	0	0	0	0
1947–48	Pittsburgh Hornets	AHL	30	23	17	40	11	—	—	—	—	—
1948–49	Toronto Maple Leafs	NHL	1	0	0	0	0	6	5	2	7	0
1948–49	Pittsburgh Hornets	AHL	68	55	57	112	4	—	—	—	—	—
1949–50	Toronto Maple Leafs	NHL	68	22	23	45	6	7	0	3	3	2
1950–51	Toronto Maple Leafs	NHL	70	30	21	51	10	11	7	3	10	0
1951–52	Toronto Maple Leafs	NHL	70	27	30	57	6	4	0	0	0	0
1952–53	Toronto Maple Leafs	NHL	70	20	19	39	6	—	—	—	—	—
1953–54	Toronto Maple Leafs	NHL	70	22	16	38	28	5	1	1	2	0
1954–55	Toronto Maple Leafs	NHL	70	33	21	54	14	4	3	1	4	0
1955–56	Toronto Maple Leafs	NHL	55	4	17	21	8	5	1	0	1	0
1956–57	Toronto Maple Leafs	NHL	70	17	24	41	4	—	—	—	—	—
1957–58	Toronto Maple Leafs	NHL	12	2	1	3	2	—	—	—	—	—
1957–58	Whitby Dunlops	OHA-Sr.	28	24	19	43	4	—	—	—	—	—
1958–59	Whitby Dunlops	OHA-Sr.	51	35	35	70	20	10	7	4	11	2
1958–59	Whitby Dunlops	Al-Cup	—	—	—	—	—	12	12	8	20	8
NHL totals			601	186	183	369	94	44	17	10	27	2

Preceded by Ted Kennedy	Toronto Maple Leafs captain 1955–56	Succeeded by Jimmy Thomson
Preceded by Red Kelly	Winner of the Lady Byng Trophy; 1952	Succeeded by Red Kelly
Preceded by Red Kelly	Winner of the Lady Byng Trophy; 1955	Succeeded by Earl Reibel
