= Frank Sullivan (ice hockey, born 1929) =

Canadian ice hockey player

- Born: June 16, 1929; Toronto, Ontario, Canada
- Died: April 5, 2009 (aged 79)
- Height: 5 ft 11 in (180 cm)
- Weight: 178 lb (81 kg; 12 st 10 lb)
- Position: Defence
- Shot: Right
- Played for: Chicago Black Hawks; Toronto Maple Leafs
- Playing career: 1949–1959

Frank Taylor Sullivan (June 16, 1929 – April 5, 2009) was a Canadian professional ice hockey player who played eight games in the National Hockey League for the Toronto Maple Leafs and Chicago Black Hawks between 1950 and 1956. The rest of his career, which lasted from 1949 to 1959, was mainly spent in the American Hockey League.

Sullivan was born in Toronto, Ontario. Frank was the brother of Peter Sullivan.

== Career statistics ==
=== Regular season and playoffs ===
			Regular season					Playoffs
Season	Team	League	GP	G	A	Pts	PIM	GP	G	A	Pts	PIM
1945–46	De La Salle College "Oaklands"	HS-CA	6	2	1	3	0	9	6	1	7	0
1946–47	Toronto Marlboros	OHA	2	2	0	2	0	—	—	—	—	—
1947–48	Oshawa Generals	OHA	33	8	18	26	60	6	1	4	5	16
1948–49	Oshawa Generals	OHA	44	14	22	36	112	2	1	3	4	2
1949–50	Toronto Marlboros	OHA Sr	41	4	6	10	38	14	6	10	16	14
1949–50	Toronto Maple Leafs	NHL	1	0	0	0	0	—	—	—	—	—
1950–51	Toronto St. Michael's Monarchs	OMHL	33	4	9	13	54	8	0	7	7	24
1951–52	Pittsburgh Hornets	AHL	61	10	16	26	76	11	0	9	9	4
1952–53	Pittsburgh Hornets	AHL	51	11	16	27	88	10	0	2	2	4
1952–53	Toronto Maple Leafs	NHL	5	0	0	0	2	—	—	—	—	—
1953–54	Pittsburgh Hornets	AHL	62	6	36	42	56	5	1	1	2	10
1954–55	Buffalo Bisons	AHL	64	11	33	44	34	10	2	6	8	6
1954–55	Chicago Black Hawks	NHL	1	0	0	0	0	—	—	—	—	—
1955–56	Buffalo Bisons	AHL	55	6	40	46	40	5	1	1	2	4
1955–56	Chicago Black Hawks	NHL	1	0	0	0	0	—	—	—	—	—
1956–57	Buffalo Bisons	AHL	56	4	41	45	46	—	—	—	—	—
1957–58	Buffalo Bisons	AHL	65	2	36	38	34	—	—	—	—	—
1958–59	Springfield Indians	AHL	69	9	28	37	48	—	—	—	—	—
AHL totals			483	59	246	305	422	41	4	19	23	28
NHL totals			8	0	0	0	2	—	—	—	—	—
