= Oxford Park, Montreal =

Urban park in Montreal, Canada

Oxford Park
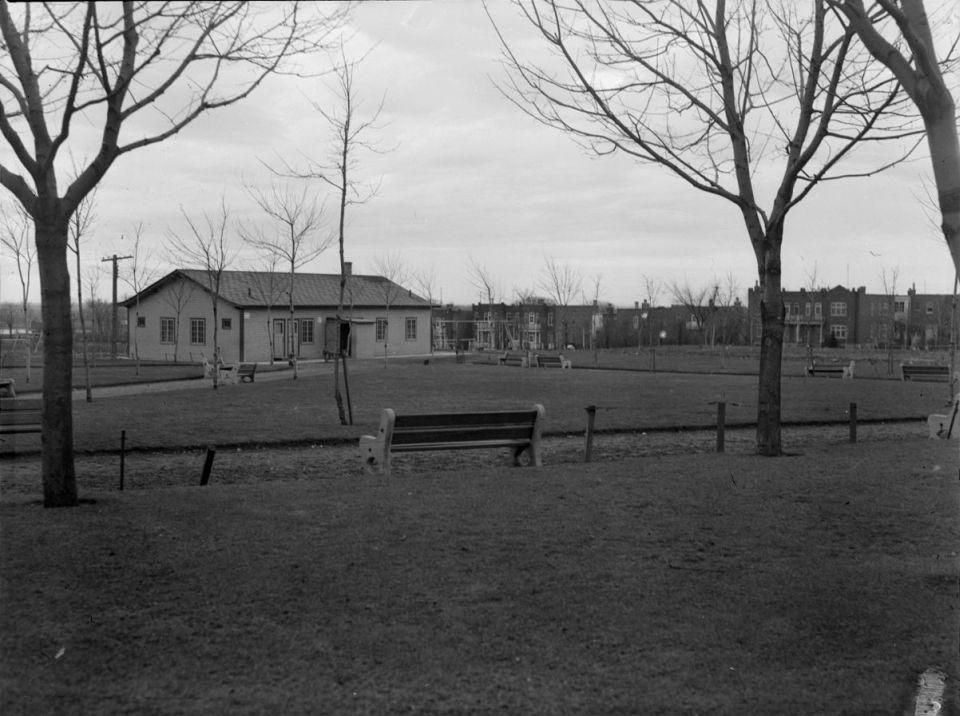
- Playground in the park in 1938

- Location within Montreal
- Type: Urban park
- Location: Côte-des-Neiges–Notre-Dame-de-Grâce, Montreal, Quebec, Canada
- Coordinates: 45°28′08″N 73°36′27″W
- Operator: City of Montreal
- Open: 6:00 a.m to 12:00 a.m.
- Status: Open all year
- Public transit: at Vendôme station STM Bus:17, 90, 104 and 371
- Website: Georges-Saint-Pierre

Oxford Park, officially named Georges-Saint-Pierre Park since 1996 and located in the southern part of the Notre-Dame-de-Grâce neighbourhood, is a park in Montreal, Quebec, Canada. It was known as the Oxford Park in the 19th century, with activities operated by the Oxford Park Association, and this name is sometimes still used by some people who grew up in the area. In 1996, the City of Montreal formally named it the Georges-Saint-Pierre Park in honour of the founder of the local Caisse Populaire Saint-Raymond, a community credit union.

The park was made famous for its sporting tradition. Hockey greats as Doug Harvey, Howie Morenz, Kenny Mosdell and Fleming Mackell learned their crafts on the outdoor rink which was part of a larger neighbourhood house league, including such teams at Terrebonne Park, Benny Park, and Patricia Park. The park was also where boxing legend Johnny Greco played sports as a child. The park is bounded by Oxford, Upper Lachine, Old Orchard Avenue and Saint Jacques Street.

The park was initially part of a farm owned by the Brodie clan, who bought the land after arriving from Scotland.

After several generations the family sold to the city of Montreal in 1949 for $73,000 under the condition that the historic farmhouse would be turned into a library or facility for children. The city reneged on this clause and the stone building was demolished in the 1960s.

The park was also home to a longstanding Italian Festival which was cancelled after the city added a controversial fenced-off plastic turf soccer field, which could get damaged during fireworks. Many italian events still take place in the park, such as ItalFestMTL, the Montréal Italian Week.
