= Doug Harvey (ice hockey) =

Canadian ice hockey player and coach (1924–1989)

- Hockey Hall of Fame, 1973
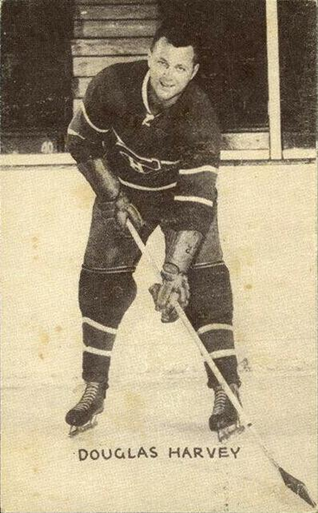
- Harvey with the Montreal Canadiens c. 1940s
- Born: December 19, 1924 Montreal, Quebec, Canada
- Died: December 26, 1989 (aged 65) Montreal, Quebec, Canada
- Height: 5 ft 11 in (180 cm)
- Weight: 190 lb (86 kg; 13 st 8 lb)
- Position: Defence
- Shot: Left
- Played for: Montreal Canadiens; New York Rangers; St. Louis Blues; Detroit Red Wings
- Playing career: 1945–1969
- Military career
- Allegiance: Canada
- Branch: Royal Canadian Navy
- Service years: 1942–1945
- Rank: Chief Petty Officer
- Conflicts: World War II

Douglas Norman Harvey (December 19, 1924 – December 26, 1989) was a Canadian professional hockey defenceman. Widely regarded as one of the greatest defenders in National Hockey League (NHL) history, Harvey was elected to the Hockey Hall of Fame in 1973 and was named one of the 100 Greatest NHL Players in history in 2017. Individually he won the James Norris Memorial Trophy as the best defenceman seven times, and was named to the end of season NHL All-Star team as a First All-Star 10 times. He played from 1947 until 1964, and from 1966 until 1969. Best known for playing with the Montreal Canadiens, Harvey also played for the New York Rangers, Detroit Red Wings, and St. Louis Blues, as well as several teams in the minor leagues. He also served as the player-coach of the Rangers for one season, and served a similar role for the minor-league Kansas City Blues. He was also a coach.

Born and raised in Montreal, Harvey played junior hockey for local teams. He joined the Royal Canadian Navy during the Second World War, and while he spent the bulk of his time with the naval hockey team, he did see active service defending merchant shipping. A standout athlete, Harvey also played Canadian football and baseball at this time, though he gave up on both sports to concentrate on hockey. Signed by the Canadiens he made the team in 1947, though initially he was criticized for his style of play. After a few years, Harvey began to demonstrate his abilities and became regarded as one of the top defenders in the NHL. Regarded as a team leader he was voted captain of the team in 1960, though he clashed with Canadiens management due to personal differences, which, combined with his age, led to him being traded to New York in 1961.

Harvey spent two years with the Rangers before the team felt he was no longer effective and assigned him to their minor-league affiliate, then released him in 1963. Harvey would spend the next five years in the minor leagues, briefly playing for Detroit, before he joined the Blues during the 1968 playoffs. He spent one final year in the NHL with the Blues before retiring in 1969. Following his playing career, Harvey served in coaching and scouting roles for a few years, but a serious alcohol problem developed during the latter stages of his career kept him from serving in any capacity for long. He reconciled with the Canadiens a few years before his death, having his #2 sweater retired, and served as a part-time scout for the team. With the Canadiens, Harvey won the Stanley Cup six times and played in the Stanley Cup Final five more times.

== Early life ==
Harvey was born in Montreal on December 19, 1924, the second child of Alfred and Martha Harvey. Alfred was born in Hammersmith, United Kingdom in 1896 and had moved to Canada with his parents in 1905, while Martha was born in Pennsylvania to Welsh immigrants. The family lived in Notre-Dame-de-Grâce (NDG), an English-speaking working-class neighbourhood of Montreal, where Alfred worked in the warehouse of N.C. Polson. Doug was the second child, following Alfred Jr. (Alf) and preceding Howard and Mary.

As a child Harvey was physically active, playing in many sports, and was also known as a troublemaker, often getting into fights with neighbouring children. Outside of sports he delivered newspapers, with one of his customers being future Canadiens' teammate Bill Durnan. He first showed his athletic ability in Canadian football, and when he entered West Hill High School in 1939 he joined the team there, playing both on offence and defence. He also played for the West Hill hockey team, and he first began to demonstrate his skills as a hockey player there. Harvey had played hockey from a young age, but only joined an organised league when he was 13, asked to join a team by his brother Alf. Initially he played goaltender, owing to his small stature, but soon moved to centre. Only later would he switch to defence.

The Second World War was ongoing while Harvey was completing high school, and in 1942, one month before his 18th birthday, he enlisted in the Royal Canadian Navy, following the advice of Alf, who had already done so. Recognized as a skilled hockey player, Harvey was initially assigned to the Navy's hockey team, which was used to boost public morale. However, Harvey wanted to serve actively in the war, so requested a transfer to active service, though this was not addressed until 1944. In the spring of 1944, Doug Harvey was assigned to a defensively equipped merchant ship; this was again a suggestion of Alf, as it meant a less rigorous lifestyle on board a naval vessel. Harvey would spend the next year regularly crossing the Atlantic while helping protect supplies being shipped to Europe and Africa. Throughout this time Harvey's ships were never fired upon, and he would later look back fondly on his service. It was also during this period that biographer William Brown believes Harvey began to develop an alcohol addiction; neither of his parents drank, which was in stark contrast to the naval service, though Brown concedes it only became a serious problem for Harvey later in life.

== Amateur career ==
=== Minor league hockey ===
Harvey played minor league hockey in Oxford Park, NDG, then began his professional career with the Montreal Royals of the Quebec Senior Hockey League where he played from 1945 to 1947, helping them win the Allan Cup. He then played one season with the Buffalo Bisons of the American Hockey League. He made the jump to the Montreal Canadiens of the NHL in the 1947–48 NHL season and remained with the team until 1961.

=== Football and baseball ===
In the early 1940s, Harvey also played rugby football (later known as Canadian football). He started to play competitively while at West Hill, and though he could play both offence and defence equally well, he was most known as a defensive halfback. He continued on with the sport when he joined the navy, playing for their Montreal-based team, St. Hyacinthe–Donnacona Navy. In 1942 Harvey was named the most valuable player of the Quebec Rugby Football Union. The Donnacona Navy won the 1944 Grey Cup as Canadian champions, though Harvey had been sent into active service and did not play in the game. After the war he briefly played for the newly formed Montreal Hornets, but a mid-season injury forced him out. Though skilled at football, Harvey gave up the sport as it was only semi-professional in Canada at that time, while hockey was fully professional.

Harvey also played baseball at a competitive level, spending summers on teams from 1947 to 1950, mainly playing as a third baseman. In 1947 he was invited to join the Ottawa Nationals, a team run by Tommy Gorman (who had recently left his position as general manager of the Montreal Canadiens hockey team) and competed in the Class C Border League. A skilled ball player, in 1949 Harvey led the Border League in runs, runs batted in, and batting average. He was also offered a contract by Major League Baseball's Boston Braves, but he turned down the offer as it would only see him play in Class B (another level in the minor leagues).

== Professional career ==
=== Montreal Canadiens ===
Beginning in the 1951–52 NHL season under coach Dick Irvin, Harvey was named to the All-Star team 11 consecutive times. He won the James Norris Memorial Trophy in 1955, as the league's best defenceman, for the first of seven times. In an era when the defenceman's role did not include scoring points, Harvey used his skating speed and passing ability to become a factor in making the Canadiens a high-scoring team.

He won the Stanley Cup six times, all with Montreal. During the 1954 Finals, however, he scored a Cup-losing own-goal when he tried to block a shot by Tony Leswick of the Detroit Red Wings with his glove but instead tipped it past goalie Gerry McNeil. McNeil, who struggled with the pressure of being an NHL goalie, quit hockey the following year.

Between 1955 and 1962, Harvey won the James Norris Memorial Trophy as the NHL's top defenceman every year except 1959, when it went to his teammate Tom Johnson.

Prior to the 1960–61 season, the Canadiens players voted for Harvey to be their captain; he succeeded Maurice Richard, who had served in that role for his last four years as a player. This was not welcomed by team management, who were not happy with Harvey's actions on and off the ice.

Harvey was an outspoken critic of the hockey establishment who controlled players' careers via the reserve clause, which restricted player rights. In Harvey's day, players were not highly paid, with Harvey earning less than $30,000 a season at the peak of his career.

=== New York Rangers ===
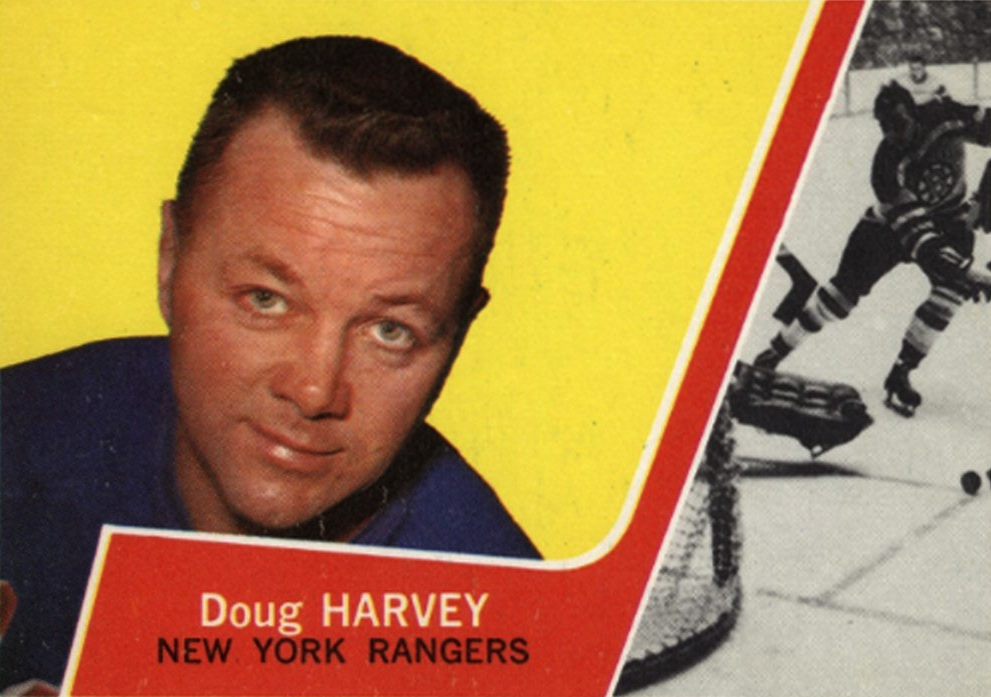
Harvey on a Topps card from 1963

After the Canadiens lost in the 1961 playoffs, Canadiens' general manager Frank J. Selke singled out Harvey for the team's poor performance and began to look at ways to get rid of him. Though he was still considered one of the best players in the NHL, Selke and the Canadiens had tired of his antics and soon were in discussions with the New York Rangers about a possible trade. Muzz Patrick, the coach and general manager of the Rangers, had tired of the dual role, and agreed to take on Harvey if he could be convinced to be a player-coach. While Harvey was reluctant to move to New York he agreed to talk to Patrick, who offered a two-year contract worth $25,000 per year, a fairly high salary. After initially refusing, he agreed after a third year was added to the contract.

Harvey again won the Norris Trophy in 1961–62, the first Ranger to do so. As coach, he tried to have the team play a similar style to what he had seen in Montreal, which helped the Rangers make the playoffs for the first time since 1958. Desiring to be closer to the players, which he felt was not possible as their coach, Harvey resigned as coach for the 1962–63 season, and was only convinced to remain with the Rangers when Patrick offered him a $30,000-per-year salary, reportedly the highest in NHL history to that point. Harvey's play remained at a high level: he led all NHL defencemen in scoring with 39 points, but was criticized for the team's lack of success. Harvey missed the Rangers' training camp prior to the start of the 1963–64 season, owing to issues with his restaurant, and when he returned was sent to the team's minor league affiliate, the St. Paul Rangers of the Central Professional Hockey League, where he played five games before rejoining New York. After recording two assists in 14 games during the 1963–64 season, Harvey continued to attract negative attention; rather than return to the minor leagues, he asked to be released from his contract.

=== Minor leagues ===
After leaving the Rangers, Harvey spent two years with the Quebec Aces of the AHL. He followed that with one and a half seasons with the Baltimore Clippers and a further half season with the Pittsburgh Hornets.

In 1964 Harvey, Gump Worsley, and Red Berenson played for the Montreal Jr. Canadiens in a game against the Soviet national team. Harvey played almost 50 minutes during the 3–2 loss.

=== Detroit Red Wings and St. Louis Blues ===
In January 1967, Harvey was called up to play for the Detroit Red Wings in a back-to-back series against the Chicago Black Hawks. However he disappointed Red Wings management by showing up roughly 20 pounds (9.1 kg) overweight, and was largely ineffective in the two games, so was sent back to Pittsburgh for the remainder of the season. With the Hornets he won the Calder Cup, the AHL championship, though the team disbanded after the season as the Pittsburgh Penguins were due to start playing in the NHL for 1967–68. He finished his NHL career in 1969 with the St. Louis Blues. In addition, he was hired as coach and manager of the Kansas City Blues, which was the St. Louis Blues' minor league affiliate in 1967–68. Harvey served as player-coach during his first season in New York, but was never entirely comfortable with this dual role.

== Post-playing career ==
After retiring from playing, Harvey became head coach of the Laval Saints of the newly formed Quebec Major Junior Hockey League. However, he only coached 16 games before leaving the team, finishing with a record of four wins and 12 losses. Offered a role as an assistant coach with the Los Angeles Kings of the NHL he went there, serving out the rest of the season with the team. He was offered a chance to play for the team but declined as he was 45 at that point and had not played in over a year.

In 1973, Harvey was hired as an assistant coach and scout by the Houston Aeros of the upstart World Hockey Association. With the Aeros he helped sign former NHL star Gordie Howe and his two sons, Mark and Marty, which was considered a major coup for the new league. Though he had initially stayed sober with Houston, Harvey relapsed and the team let him go at the end of the 1973–74 season, which saw the Aeros win the Avco World Trophy.

== Personal life ==
=== Family ===
Harvey married Ursula Hardie on May 21, 1949, in Montreal. It is not certain when they met, but they had been together since at least 1946. They had six children: Doug Jr., Darlene, Glen, Nancy, Diane, and Maria. The family lived in NDG throughout Harvey's playing career, though they moved to Long Island during his first season with the Rangers before returning to Montreal after a few months, living in a house he built with his brothers in 1950. Doug and Ursula would separate in 1980.

=== Off-ice business ===
Outside of hockey, Harvey had several business ventures. After building his own home, Harvey and his brothers began a housebuilding business in 1953, and they later established an aluminum window business as well. Harvey, who was well known for his hockey career at this point, would spend most of his time talking to clients, leaving Alf and Howard to do the physical work. In the early 1960s Harvey opened a restaurant in Montreal, Chez Doug Harvey, with an associate he had recently met. The restaurant proved a massive financial failure, with his partner absconding with a large amount of money, and ultimately cost Harvey around $65,000, equal to nearly two years' pay for him. It also took a serious toll on his family's finances, which were exacerbated when he played in the minor leagues, making far less than he had in the NHL; on several occasions friends would help cover the mortgage to prevent Harvey from defaulting.

Starting in the mid-1960s Harvey started a summer hockey school for young boys. He would lead a two-week school instructing them on how to play better, and would often buy equipment and board players who were unable to cover the associated costs. The school ran yearly until 1979. While in Ottawa in 1972 Harvey was arrested for having a concealed weapon without a permit, as he was trying to board a plane. He was given a six-month suspended sentence, and the gun was confiscated. In the early 1980s Harvey was offered a job at the Connaught Park Racetrack in Aylmer, Quebec, living with and working for the family of NHL founder Tommy Gorman's son, Joe Gorman, as well as the opportunity to live in retired railcar that had been used by Canadian prime minister John Diefenbaker in the 1950s, and subsequently purchased by the Gorman family. Doug accepted the position and lived with the Gormans as a part of their family until his return to Montreal.

For years, Harvey battled alcoholism while suffering from bipolar disorder. In 1985 he was offered a job with the Montreal Canadiens as a scout. He died on December 26, 1989, due to cirrhosis of the liver, a week after his 65th birthday, and was interred in the Notre-Dame-des-Neiges Cemetery in Montreal.

== Playing style ==
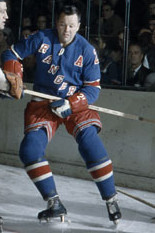
Harvey with the New York Rangers in 1962

Prior to the start of Harvey's career, it was normal for defencemen to pass the puck off to forwards or dump it into the offensive zone; the goal was to move it out of the defensive zone quickly and limit chances for the opponent to set up plays. Harvey was not interested in this system, preferring to keep control of the puck as long as he could. In this way Harvey felt he could control the tempo of the play; he felt that quickly dumping the puck only turned over possession to the opponent. He would then pass the puck to a teammate who would quickly enter the offensive zone and set up scoring chances that way. This style of play was unusual at the time and the Canadiens' fans and coaches alike perceived Harvey as a lazy player. That Harvey, who was roughly 5 ft 11 in (1.80 m) and 190 pounds (86 kg) during his playing career, had a stocky look did not help this perception. However once it became apparent what he was doing he earned recognition for his ability.

Harvey's ability to set up offence helped the Canadiens create one of the strongest offensive teams in NHL history. Though he did not score many goals during his career, Harvey helped others score, and recorded several seasons with high assist totals. With this Harvey led NHL defencemen in assists five times and scoring three times during his career. Indeed, the Canadiens of the late 1950s were so strong on the power play that they repeatedly could score multiple goals on one power play. Other teams began to resent this, and so at the end of the 1955–56 season the NHL adopted a rule that ended a power play after one goal was scored.

== Legacy ==
From early in his playing career, Harvey was recognized as one of the top defencemen in NHL history and one of the best players in general. With seven Norris Trophy wins he is tied with Nicklas Lidström for second most all-time, behind Bobby Orr's eight. He was inducted into the Hockey Hall of Fame in 1973, though he had been eligible since 1972. It was said that the one-year delay was because of Harvey's lifestyle and that he was asked to clean himself up if he wanted to be elected. Harvey apparently took this as a slight; he refused to attend his own induction ceremony in 1973, reportedly going fishing instead.

Prior to a home game against the Hartford Whalers on October 26, 1985, the Montreal Canadiens retired Harvey's number 2. In 1991, the Confederation Arena in NDG was renamed the Doug Harvey Arena. Efforts had been made to rename the arena prior to Harvey's death, but Montreal rarely renamed arenas after still-living people. The Hockey News, the premier hockey magazine, released a list of the top 100 NHL players of all time in 1997; at sixth, Harvey was the highest-ranked deceased player on the list at the time it was compiled. He was also named one of the 100 Greatest NHL Players in 2017.

== Career statistics ==
=== Regular season and playoffs ===
			Regular season					Playoffs
Season	Team	League	GP	G	A	Pts	PIM	GP	G	A	Pts	PIM
1942–43	Montreal Navy	MNDL	4	0	0	0	0	—	—	—	—	—
1942–43	Montreal Jr. Royals	QJHL	21	4	6	10	17	6	3	4	7	10
1942–43	Montreal Royals	QSHL	1	0	0	0	0	—	—	—	—	—
1943–44	Montreal Jr. Royals	QJHL	13	4	6	10	34	4	2	6	8	10
1943–44	Montreal Royals	QSHL	1	1	1	2	2	—	—	—	—	—
1943–44	Montreal Navy	MNDL	15	4	1	5	24	5	3	1	4	15
1943–44	Montreal Jr. Royals	M-Cup	—	—	—	—	—	3	0	1	1	6
1944–45	Montreal Navy	MNDL	3	0	2	2	2	6	3	1	4	6
1944–45	Montreal Jr. Royals	QJHL	—	—	—	—	—	9	2	2	4	10
1945–46	Montreal Royals	QSHL	34	2	6	8	90	11	1	6	7	37
1946–47	Montreal Royals	QSHL	40	2	26	28	171	11	2	4	6	62
1946–47	Montreal Royals	Al-Cup	—	—	—	—	—	14	4	9	13	26
1947–48	Montreal Canadiens	NHL	35	4	4	8	32	—	—	—	—	—
1947–48	Buffalo Bisons	AHL	24	1	7	8	38	—	—	—	—	—
1948–49	Montreal Canadiens	NHL	55	3	13	16	87	7	0	1	1	10
1949–50	Montreal Canadiens	NHL	70	4	20	24	76	5	0	2	2	10
1950–51	Montreal Canadiens	NHL	70	5	24	29	93	11	0	5	5	12
1951–52	Montreal Canadiens	NHL	68	6	23	29	82	11	0	3	3	8
1952–53	Montreal Canadiens	NHL	69	4	30	34	67	12	0	5	5	8
1953–54	Montreal Canadiens	NHL	68	8	29	37	110	10	0	2	2	12
1954–55	Montreal Canadiens	NHL	70	6	43	49	58	12	0	8	8	6
1955–56	Montreal Canadiens	NHL	62	5	39	44	60	12	2	5	7	10
1956–57	Montreal Canadiens	NHL	70	6	44	50	92	10	0	7	7	10
1957–58	Montreal Canadiens	NHL	68	9	32	41	131	10	2	9	11	16
1958–59	Montreal Canadiens	NHL	61	4	16	20	61	11	1	11	12	22
1959–60	Montreal Canadiens	NHL	66	6	21	27	45	8	3	0	3	6
1960–61	Montreal Canadiens	NHL	58	6	33	39	48	6	0	1	1	8
1961–62	New York Rangers	NHL	69	6	24	30	42	6	0	1	1	2
1962–63	New York Rangers	NHL	68	4	35	39	92	—	—	—	—	—
1963–64	St. Paul Rangers	CHL	5	2	2	4	6	—	—	—	—	—
1963–64	New York Rangers	NHL	14	0	2	2	10	—	—	—	—	—
1963–64	Quebec Aces	AHL	52	6	36	42	30	9	0	4	4	10
1964–65	Quebec Aces	AHL	64	1	36	37	72	4	1	1	2	9
1965–66	Baltimore Clippers	AHL	67	7	32	39	80	—	—	—	—	—
1966–67	Baltimore Clippers	AHL	24	2	9	11	10	—	—	—	—	—
1966–67	Pittsburgh Hornets	AHL	28	0	9	9	22	9	0	0	0	2
1966–67	Detroit Red Wings	NHL	2	0	0	0	0	—	—	—	—	—
1967–68	Kansas City Blues	CHL	59	4	16	20	12	7	0	6	6	6
1967–68	St. Louis Blues	NHL	—	—	—	—	—	8	0	4	4	12
1968–69	St. Louis Blues	NHL	70	2	20	22	30	—	—	—	—	—
NHL totals			1,113	88	452	540	1,216	137	8	64	72	152

- Source: Total Hockey

== NHL coaching record ==
Harvey has the distinction of being the NHL's last-ever full-time player-coach. He held the dual roles with the New York Rangers during the 1961–62 season—a year in which he led the team to the semi-finals and was awarded his seventh Norris Trophy for best defenceman in the league. He again served as a player-coach for the Kansas City Blues of the Central Professional Hockey League in 1967.

Team	Year	Regular season						Postseason
Team	Year	G	W	L	T	Pts	Division rank	Result
New York Rangers	1961–62	70	26	32	12	64	4th in NHL	Lost in semi-finals

- Source: Total Hockey

== Awards ==
=== NHL ===
Award	Year(s)
James Norris Memorial Trophy	1955, 1956, 1957, 1958, 1960, 1961, 1962
NHL All-Star Game	1951, 1952, 1953, 1954, 1955, 1956, 1957, 1958, 1959, 1960, 1961, 1962, 1969
NHL First All-Star Team	1952, 1953, 1954, 1955, 1956, 1957, 1958, 1960, 1961, 1962
NHL Second All-Star Team	1959
Stanley Cup	1953, 1956, 1957, 1958, 1959, 1960

== Bibliography ==
- Brown, William (2002), Doug: The Doug Harvey Story, Montreal: Véhicule Press, ISBN 1-550-65166-8
- Coffey, Wayne (January 1, 2017), Doug Harvey: 100 Greatest NHL Players, National Hockey League
- Diamond, Dan, ed. (2002), Total Hockey: The Official Encyclopedia of the National Hockey League, Second Edition, New York: Total Sports Publishing, ISBN 1-892129-85-X
- Doug Harvey Page, Quebec Major Junior Hockey League, 2020
- Dryden, Steve, ed. (1997), The Top 100 NHL Players of All Time, Toronto: McClelland & Stewart, ISBN 0-7710-4176-4
- Feige, Timothy (2011), Hockey's Greatest Tragedies: The Broken Heroes of the Fastest Game on Earth, London: Arcturus Publishing, ISBN 978-1-84837-742-4
- Frayne, Trent (February 15, 1958), "How Doug Harvey loafed his way to fame", Maclean's: 22–23, 47–49, archived from the original on December 2, 2020
- Hedger, Brian (May 31, 2012), Seven-time Norris Trophy winner Lidstrom retires, National Hockey League, archived from the original on March 11, 2016
- Jenish, D'Arcy (2008), The Montreal Canadiens: 100 Years of Glory, Toronto: Doubleday Canada, ISBN 978-0-385-66324-3
- Jenish, D'Arcy (1992), The Stanley Cup: A Hundred Years of Hockey at its Best, Toronto, Ontario: McClelland & Stewart Inc., ISBN 0-7710-4406-2
- Kreiser, John; Friedman, Lou (1996), The New York Rangers: Broadway's Longest-Running Hit, Champaign, Illinois: Sagamore Publishing, ISBN 1-57167-041-6
- Leonetti, Mike (2003), Canadiens Legends: Montreal's Hockey Heroes, Vancouver: Raincoast Books, ISBN 1-55192-731-4
- McKenna, Brian (2007), Early Exits: The Premature Endings of Baseball Careers, Lanham, Maryland: Scarecrow Press, ISBN 978-0-8108-5858-9
- Scott, Bob (December 12, 1964), "Russians Rally, win 3–2 at Forum", The Gazette, Montreal
- Shea, Kevin (November 21, 2008), One on One with Doug Harvey, Hockey Hall of Fame
- Willes, Ed (2004), The Rebel League: The Short and Unruly Life of the World Hockey Association, Toronto: McClelland & Stewart, ISBN 0-7710-8947-3

Preceded by Red Kelly	Winner of the Norris Trophy; 1955, 1956, 1957, 1958	Succeeded by Tom Johnson
Preceded by Maurice Richard	Montreal Canadiens captain 1960–61	Succeeded by Jean Beliveau
Preceded by Tom Johnson	Winner of the Norris Trophy; 1960, 1961, 1962	Succeeded by Pierre Pilote
Preceded by Alf Pike	Head coach of the New York Rangers; 1961–62	Succeeded by Muzz Patrick
