= Tom Johnson (ice hockey) =

Canadian ice hockey player (1928–2007)

- Hockey Hall of Fame, 1970
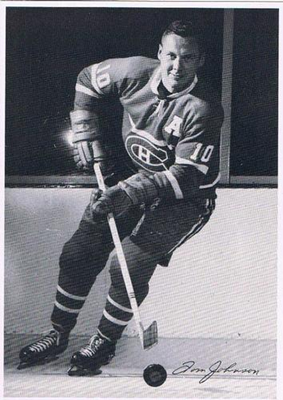
- Johnson with the Montreal Canadiens in 1960
- Born: February 18, 1928 Baldur, Manitoba, Canada
- Died: November 21, 2007 (aged 79) Falmouth, Massachusetts, U.S.
- Height: 6 ft 0 in (183 cm)
- Weight: 180 lb (82 kg; 12 st 12 lb)
- Position: Defence
- Shot: Left
- Played for: Montreal Canadiens; Boston Bruins
- Playing career: 1947–1965

Thomas Christian "Tomcat" Johnson (February 18, 1928 – November 21, 2007) was a Canadian professional ice hockey player and executive. As a player, he played for the Montreal Canadiens and Boston Bruins in the National Hockey League. He later served as the assistant general manager and head coach of the Bruins. Johnson was the recipient of the Norris Trophy in 1959. He was inducted into the Hockey Hall of Fame in 1970.

Johnson was born in Baldur, Manitoba and was of Icelandic descent. He died of heart failure at age 79 in Falmouth, Massachusetts.

== Hockey career ==
In his first year of junior with the Winnipeg Monarchs in 1946-47, Johnson was questioned to be worthy of a spot on the Toronto Maple Leafs' list of sponsored players. However following a match in which he scored the tying and winning goal, he caught the eye of a scout for the Montreal Canadiens, who worked out a cash settlement with the Maple Leafs and placed him on their negotiation list.

The first year Johnson came to Montreal, general manager Frank Selke was unable to gain a transfer from the Canadian Amateur Hockey Association. He spent a year playing informal Hockey, taking a few classes at McGill University he also was exposed to the Canadiens winning environment at their home games. During the next season, he made his first 2 appearances with the Canadians but spent the majority of his first three pro seasons with their farm team the Montreal Royals of the Quebec Senior Hockey League along with the Buffalo Bisons of the AHL. During his time in the minors he impressed coaches both with his enthusiasm from the bench and his work ethic on the ice. During this time he also improved his skating, which had always been his one major drawback.

Johnson finally got into a starting role with the Canadiens during the 1950-1951 season. Impressing the team with his eagerness and durability playing all 70 regular-season games. During his career Johnson became a key part of the Canadians penalty-killing unit, where the team utilized his speed and his ability to win the majority of the battles in the corners. He played in his first All star game in 1952.

One of the top defensemen of his era, Johnson's patented move was to steal the puck from an attacking forward without body contact. This skill allowed him to feed a pass to his teammates while the opposition was still heading toward the Montreal net. Although he rarely saw power-play duty, coach Dick Irvin would often switch Johnson to center if the Canadiens needed a goal late in the game. Johnson won his first Stanley Cup ring in 1953 when the Canadiens defeated Boston. He later played a vital role on the Canadiens squad that won the Stanley Cup an unprecedented five consecutive times from 1956 to 1960.

After apprenticing under the great Butch Bouchard, Johnson settled in with Jean Guy Talbot as long time defensive partners. A slow-footed defender, Johnson rarely received any power play time but was a key penalty killer for Les Habitants. The 6 time Stanley Cup champ was also known for his physical, sometimes dirty play. A hard hitter who would drop the gloves when needed. However he also had a nasty reputation for using his stick. Johnson also had the speed and skill to break up plays and spark the Canadiens' transition game.

By the time the Canadians began dominating the NHL, Johnson was beginning to receive his due credit. In 1956 he was selected to the NHL Second All-Star Team. Three years later, he arguably had his best season as he won the Norris Trophy as the leagues best defenseman and earned a spot on the First All-Star lineup. That year he was arguably the most valuable player on the team as he stepped into the void created when Doug Harvey was injured. Johnson didn't have Harvey's speed but he was a superb stickhandler and a consistent, accurate passer who rarely erred in his own end of the rink.

Johnson later stated "I was classified as a defensive defenceman. I stayed back and minded the store. With the high powered scoring teams I was with, I just had to get them the puck and let them do the rest," said Johnson, who wore #10 long before Guy Lafleur made it immortal.

Johnson remained a key veteran following the glory years. During the early 1960s, he often formed an effective partnership with young Jacques Laperriere. However Johnson's fortunes took a turn for the worse in 1962-63 when he suffered a horrific facial injury that damaged his eye muscles to the point that his career was in jeopardy. In a difficult business decision, the Canadiens left him unprotected in the Waiver Draft since it was unclear whether he could fully recover his vision. The Boston Bruins then took a chance and claimed him, a decision that would quickly help improve their fortunes, which had hurt them in recent years.

Throughout his career Johnson was an extremely durable player in his 978 games with Montreal and Boston. He finished with 51 goals and 213 assists. He likely would have played longer had he not suffered a serious leg injury in the 1964-65 season while playing with Boston. When Chicago's Chico Maki's skate slashed a nerve in Johnson's left leg. The gash ended Johnson's playing career despite a feverish attempt to comeback by Johnson. Johnson, who also suffered two serious eye injuries, was left with a permanent limp.

In total, Johnson won the Stanley Cup as a player (1953, 1956, 1957, 1958, 1959, 1960) while being selected to the NHL All-Star Game eight times (1952, 1953, 1956, 1957, 1958, 1959, 1960, 1963).

== Coaching/later career ==
Johnson in 1972

After retirement he stayed a member of the Bruins organization winning his 7th Stanley Cup as an assistant general manager in 1970. The following year after former Bruins coach Harry Sinden stepped down, Johnson was named as his replacement during his first year as coach in 1971 he led the team to a first place finish with 121 points. However they were upset in the first round of the playoffs. The next season he led the Bruins to a 54–13-11 record, winning the Stanley Cup for an eighth time in 1972 defeating the Rangers four games to two. Johnson was then promoted back to assistant general manager in the middle of the 1973 season. He remained a member of the Bruins organization for more than 30 years serving a variety of different jobs until retiring for good in 1998.

He sits as the Bruins all time regular season coaching wins percentage leader (0.738, minimum 100 games coached).

Don Cherry later commented on Johnson stating “He played and won six Stanley Cups, he coached Stanley Cups, he won a Norris Trophy, he's in the Hall of Fame," "What else can you do in hockey?"

He spent time in Cape Cod and was married to his wife Doris together they had a son Tommy and daughter Julie.

== Career statistics ==
			Regular season					Playoffs
Season	Team	League	GP	G	A	Pts	PIM	GP	G	A	Pts	PIM
1946–47	Winnipeg Monarchs	MJHL	14	10	4	14	12	7	3	1	4	19
1947–48	Montreal Royals	QSHL	16	0	4	4	10	—	—	—	—	—
1947–48	Montreal Canadiens	NHL	1	0	0	0	0	—	—	—	—	—
1948–49	Buffalo Bisons	AHL	68	4	18	22	70	—	—	—	—	—
1949–50	Buffalo Bisons	AHL	58	7	19	26	52	5	0	0	0	20
1949–50	Montreal Canadiens	NHL	—	—	—	—	—	1	0	0	0	0
1950–51	Montreal Canadiens	NHL	70	2	8	10	128	11	0	0	0	6
1951–52	Montreal Canadiens	NHL	68	0	7	7	76	11	1	0	1	2
1952–53	Montreal Canadiens	NHL	70	3	8	11	63	12	2	3	5	8
1953–54	Montreal Canadiens	NHL	70	7	11	18	85	11	1	2	3	30
1954–55	Montreal Canadiens	NHL	70	6	19	25	74	12	2	0	2	22
1955–56	Montreal Canadiens	NHL	64	3	10	13	75	10	0	2	2	8
1956–57	Montreal Canadiens	NHL	70	4	11	15	59	10	0	2	2	13
1957–58	Montreal Canadiens	NHL	66	3	18	21	75	2	0	0	0	0
1958–59	Montreal Canadiens	NHL	70	10	29	39	76	11	2	3	5	8
1959–60	Montreal Canadiens	NHL	64	4	25	29	59	8	0	1	1	4
1960–61	Montreal Canadiens	NHL	70	1	15	16	54	6	0	1	1	8
1961–62	Montreal Canadiens	NHL	62	1	17	18	45	6	0	1	1	0
1962–63	Montreal Canadiens	NHL	43	3	5	8	28	—	—	—	—	—
1963–64	Boston Bruins	NHL	70	4	21	25	33	—	—	—	—	—
1964–65	Boston Bruins	NHL	51	0	9	9	30	—	—	—	—	—
NHL totals			979	51	213	264	960	111	8	15	23	109

=== Coaching statistics ===
Team	Year	Regular season						Postseason			
Team	Year	G	W	L	T	Pts	Finish	W	L	Win %	Result
1970–71	Boston Bruins	78	57	14	7	121	1st in East	3	4	.429	Lost in quarterfinals
1971–72	Boston Bruins	78	54	13	11	119	1st in East	12	3	.800	Won Stanley Cup
1972–73	Boston Bruins	52	31	16	5	67	Promoted	—	—	—	—
Total		208	142	43	23			15	7	.682	

== Awards and achievements ==
- NHL Second All-Star team Defenseman (1956)
- NHL first All-Star team Defenseman (1959)
- Played in the NHL All Star game 8 times in 1952, 1953, 1956, 1957, 1958, 1959, 1960 and 1963
- James Norris Memorial Trophy winner (1959)
- Inducted into the Hockey Hall of Fame in 1970
- Inducted into the Manitoba Sports Hall of Fame and Museum in 1993
- Honored Member of the Manitoba Hockey Hall of Fame
- Regular season coaching wins percentage leader (0.738, minimum 100 games coached)
- Stanley Cup champion, 8 times (as a player 1953, 1956, 1957, 1958, 1959, 1960) (As a executive 1970, As a coach 1972)
- Coach, 26th National Hockey League All-Star Game

Preceded by Doug Harvey	Winner of the Norris Trophy; 1959	Succeeded by Doug Harvey
Preceded by Harry Sinden	Head coach of the Boston Bruins; 1970–73	Succeeded by Bep Guidolin
