= 1954–55 NHL season =

National Hockey League season

- League: National Hockey League
- Sport: Ice hockey
- Duration: October 7, 1954 – April 14, 1955
- Games: 70
- Teams: 6
- TV partner(s): CBC, SRC (Canada); None (United States)

Regular season
- Season champion: Detroit Red Wings
- Season MVP: Ted Kennedy (Maple Leafs)
- Top scorer: Bernie Geoffrion (Canadiens)

Stanley Cup
- Champions: Detroit Red Wings
- Runners-up: Montreal Canadiens

NHL seasons
- ← 1953–54 1955–56 →

The 1954–55 NHL season was the 38th season of the National Hockey League. Six teams played 70 games each. The Detroit Red Wings were the Stanley Cup champions as they defeated the Montreal Canadiens four games to three in the best-of-seven final series. The Canadiens were without star forward Maurice 'Rocket' Richard who had been suspended for the playoffs, a suspension which led to the March 17, 1955 "Richard Riot" in Montreal.

== League business ==
Art Ross announced at the league governors meeting that his connection with Boston would terminate at the end of September. As this would be his last appearance at a league meeting, he took the opportunity to thank the governors and others associated with the league during the 30 years of his being officer of the Boston club for the kindness, courtesy and cooperation he had received, and extended his good wishes for the continued success of the league. Conn Smythe and Frank Selke voiced the good wishes of all present to Ross on his retirement.

Prior to the season, Red Wings head coach Tommy Ivan left Detroit to become general manager of the Chicago Black Hawks, and Jimmy Skinner replaced him behind the bench in the Motor City. One of the first things Ivan did at Chicago was to establish an extensive farm system, something the Black Hawks never had.

== Regular season ==
On December 18, 1954, Maurice Richard scored his 400th career goal against Chicago netminder Al Rollins in a 4–1 Canadiens victory over the Black Hawks. Montreal and Toronto played to a 1–1 tie on December 29, at Maple Leaf Gardens. Maurice Richard got a standing ovation when he scored his 401st goal late in the first period.

In a scoreless tie at the Montreal Forum on March 10, a new ice cleaner and resurfacer called a Zamboni was used for the first time. The fans were not appreciative of Toronto's defensive style in this game and threw garbage, including pig's feet, on the ice.

The Richard Riot took place on March 17, 1955. Maurice Richard had been suspended by league president Clarence Campbell after an incident in a game against Boston where Richard punched the referee. Richard was suspended for the rest of the season and the playoffs. Campbell's subsequent appearance at a Canadiens' game at the Montreal Forum incited a group of protesters and led to violence in the Forum and in downtown Montreal.

=== Final standings ===
National Hockey League
		GP	W	L	T	GF	GA	DIFF	Pts
1	Detroit Red Wings	70	42	17	11	204	134	+70	95
2	Montreal Canadiens	70	41	18	11	228	157	+71	93
3	Toronto Maple Leafs	70	24	24	22	147	135	+12	70
4	Boston Bruins	70	23	26	21	169	188	−19	67
5	New York Rangers	70	17	35	18	150	210	−60	52
6	Chicago Black Hawks	70	13	40	17	161	235	−74	43

== Playoffs ==
=== Playoff bracket ===
The top four teams in the league qualified for the playoffs. In the semifinals, the first-place team played the third-place team, while the second-place team faced the fourth-place team, with the winners advancing to the Stanley Cup Final. In both rounds, teams competed in a best-of-seven series (scores in the bracket indicate the number of games won in each best-of-seven series).

Semifinals
1	Detroit	4
3	Toronto	0
2	Montreal	4
4	Boston	1

Stanley Cup Final
1	Detroit	4
2	Montreal	3

=== Semifinals ===
==== (1) Detroit Red Wings vs. (3) Toronto Maple Leafs ====
March 22	Toronto Maple Leafs	4–7	Detroit Red Wings	Olympia Stadium	Recap
Brian Cullen (1) – pp – 07:00; George Armstrong (1) – 13:01		First period	11:54 – Vic Stasiuk (1); 19:06 – Dutch Reibel (1)
No scoring		Second period	01:36 – Glen Skov (1); 09:48 – pp – Dutch Reibel (2)
Sid Smith (1) – 02:53; Ted Kennedy (1) – pp – 12:38		Third period	03:54 – Gordie Howe (1); 07:40 – pp – Gordie Howe (2); 15:07 – pp – Ted Lindsay (1)
Harry Lumley		Goalie stats	Terry Sawchuck

March 24	Toronto Maple Leafs	1–2	Detroit Red Wings	Olympia Stadium	Recap
Sid Smith (2) – 00:17		First period	08:09 – pp – Gordie Howe (3); 08:54 – pp – Alex Delvecchio (1)
No scoring		Second period	No scoring
No scoring		Third period	No scoring
Harry Lumley		Goalie stats	Terry Sawchuck

March 26	Detroit Red Wings	2–1	Toronto Maple Leafs	Maple Leaf Gardens	Recap
Ted Lindsay (2) – pp – 01:36; Dutch Reibel (3) – 11:46		First period	07:29 – pp – Sid Smith (3)
No scoring		Second period	No scoring
No scoring		Third period	No scoring
Terry Sawchuck		Goalie stats	Harry Lumley

March 29	Detroit Red Wings	3–0	Toronto Maple Leafs	Maple Leaf Gardens	Recap
No scoring		First period	No scoring
Vic Stasiuk (2) – 05:38; Gordie Howe (4) – 09:20		Second period	No scoring
Tony Leswick (1) – en – 19:33		Third period	No scoring
Terry Sawchuck		Goalie stats	Harry Lumley

Detroit won series 4–0

==== (2) Montreal Canadiens vs. (4) Boston Bruins ====
March 22	Boston Bruins	0–2	Montreal Canadiens	Montreal Forum	Recap
No scoring		First period	No scoring
No scoring		Second period	06:23 – pp – Bernie Geoffrion (1); 12:35 – pp – Jean Beliveau (1)
No scoring		Third period	No scoring
Jim Henry		Goalie stats	Jacques Plante, Charlie Hodge

March 24	Boston Bruins	1–3	Montreal Canadiens	Montreal Forum	Recap
No scoring		First period	No scoring
Real Chevrefils (1) – 16:43		Second period	01:31 – Floyd Curry (1); 11:08 – Calum MacKay (1); 13:43 – Jean Beliveau (2)
No scoring		Third period	No scoring
Jim Henry		Goalie stats	Jacques Plante, Charlie Hodge

March 27	Montreal Canadiens	2–4	Boston Bruins	Boston Garden	Recap
No scoring		First period	13:53 – Leo Labine (1); 18:25 – Fern Flaman (1); 18:45 – Real Chevrefils (2)
No scoring		Second period	18:47 – Hal Laycoe (1)
Ken Mosdell (1) – 00:30; Jack LeClair (1) – sh – 18:46		Third period	No scoring
Jacques Plante, Charlie Hodge		Goalie stats	Jim Henry

March 29	Montreal Canadiens	4–3	OT	Boston Bruins	Boston Garden	Recap
No scoring		First period		No scoring
Tom Johnson (1) – 03:51; Floyd Curry (2) – pp – 12:43		Second period		06:15 – pp – Don McKenney (1); 09:55 – Leo Labine (2)
Bernie Geoffrion (2) – 12:40		Third period		08:52 – Ed Sandford (1)
Don Marshall (1) – sh – 03:05		First overtime period		No scoring
Jacques Plante, Charlie Hodge		Goalie stats		Jim Henry

March 31	Boston Bruins	1–5	Montreal Canadiens	Montreal Forum	Recap
No scoring		First period	03:43 – Jack LeClair (2); 14:43 – pp – Dickie Moore (1)
Lorne Ferguson (1) – pp – 15:52		Second period	07:55 – Floyd Curry (3); 11:18 – Jack LeClair (3)
No scoring		Third period	08:14 – Jean Beliveau (3)
Jim Henry		Goalie stats	Jacques Plante

Montreal won series 4–1

=== Stanley Cup Final ===
April 3	Montreal Canadiens	2–4	Detroit Red Wings	Olympia Stadium	Recap
No scoring		First period	No scoring
Floyd Curry (4) – 05:09		Second period	14:00 – pp – Alex Delvecchio (2)
Floyd Curry (5) – 08:57		Third period	13:05 – Vic Stasiuk (3); 17:07 – sh – Marty Pavelich (1); 19:42 – en – Ted Lindsay (3)
Jacques Plante		Goalie stats	Terry Sawchuck

April 5	Montreal Canadiens	1–7	Detroit Red Wings	Olympia Stadium	Recap
No scoring		First period	02:15 – sh – Marcel Pronovost (1); 09:57 – Ted Lindsay (4); 16:00 – Alex Delvecchio (3); 17:11 – Gordie Howe (5)
No scoring		Second period	08:10 – Ted Lindsay (5); 15:48 – pp – Ted Lindsay (6); 19:37 – Ted Lindsay (7)
Ken Mosdell (2) – 12:32		Third period	No scoring
Jacques Plante, Charlie Hodge		Goalie stats	Terry Sawchuck

April 7	Detroit Red Wings	2–4	Montreal Canadiens	Montreal Forum	Recap
Red Kelly (1) – pp – 18:13		First period	08:30 – pp – Bernie Geoffrion (3); 08:42 – pp – Bernie Geoffrion (4)
Vic Stasiuk (4) – 16:16		Second period	14:23 – Bernie Geoffrion (5)
No scoring		Third period	07:50 – Jack LeClair (4)
Terry Sawchuck		Goalie stats	Jacques Plante

April 9	Detroit Red Wings	3–5	Montreal Canadiens	Montreal Forum	Recap
Dutch Reibel (4) – 12:38		First period	00:40 – Calum MacKay (2)
No scoring		Second period	03:41 – Bernie Geoffrion (6); 08:25 – Jean Beliveau (4); 09:07 – Tom Johnson (2)
Dutch Reibel (5) – 03:40; Jim Hay (1) – 12:000		Third period	02:33 – Floyd Curry (6)
Terry Sawchuck		Goalie stats	Jacques Plante

April 10	Montreal Canadiens	1–5	Detroit Red Wings	Olympia Stadium	Recap
Jean Beliveau (5) – pp – 08:01		First period	12:59 – Glen Skov (2); 18:59 – Gordie Howe (6)
No scoring		Second period	12:29 – pp – Gordie Howe (7); 16:20 – pp – Gordie Howe (8)
No scoring		Third period	02:09 – Vic Stasiuk (5)
Jacques Plante		Goalie stats	Terry Sawchuck

April 12	Detroit Red Wings	3–6	Montreal Canadiens	Montreal Forum	Recap
Alex Delvecchio (4) – 13:36		First period	07:30 – Jean Beliveau (6)
Alex Delvecchio (5) – pp – 15:54		Second period	03:45 – pp – Jack LeClair (5); 05:21 – pp – Bernie Geoffrion (7); 18:18 – Bernie Geoffrion (8)
Red Kelly (2) – 16:23		Third period	00:19 – Floyd Curry (7); 18:55 – Calum MacKay (3)
Terry Sawchuck		Goalie stats	Jacques Plante

April 14	Montreal Canadiens	1–3	Detroit Red Wings	Olympia Stadium	Recap
No scoring		First period	No scoring
No scoring		Second period	07:12 – Alex Delvecchio (6); 19:49 – Gordie Howe (9)
Floyd Curry (8) – pp – 14:35		Third period	02:59 – Alex Delvecchio (7)
Jacques Plante		Goalie stats	Terry Sawchuck

Detroit won series 4–3

== Awards ==
Award winners
Prince of Wales Trophy: (Regular season champion)	Detroit Red Wings
Art Ross Trophy: (Top scorer)	Bernie Geoffrion, Montreal Canadiens
Calder Memorial Trophy: (Best first-year player)	Ed Litzenberger, Chicago Black Hawks
Hart Trophy: (Most valuable player)	Ted Kennedy, Toronto Maple Leafs
James Norris Memorial Trophy: (Best defenceman)	Doug Harvey, Montreal Canadiens
Lady Byng Memorial Trophy: (Excellence and sportsmanship)	Sid Smith, Toronto Maple Leafs
Vezina Trophy: (Goaltender of team with the best goals-against average)	Terry Sawchuk, Detroit Red Wings

All-Star teams
First team	Position	Second team
Harry Lumley, Toronto Maple Leafs	G	Terry Sawchuk, Detroit Red Wings
Doug Harvey, Montreal Canadiens	D	Bob Goldham, Detroit Red Wings
Red Kelly, Detroit Red Wings	D	Fern Flaman, Boston Bruins
Jean Beliveau, Montreal Canadiens	C	Ken Mosdell, Montreal Canadiens
Maurice Richard, Montreal Canadiens	RW	Bernie Geoffrion, Montreal Canadiens
Sid Smith, Toronto Maple Leafs	LW	Danny Lewicki, New York Rangers

== Player statistics ==
=== Scoring leaders ===
Note: GP = Games played, G = Goals, A = Assists, PTS = Points, PIM = Penalties in minutes

Player	Team	GP	G	A	PTS	PIM
Bernie Geoffrion	Montreal Canadiens	70	38	37	75	57
Maurice Richard	Montreal Canadiens	67	38	36	74	125
Jean Beliveau	Montreal Canadiens	70	37	36	73	58
Earl Reibel	Detroit Red Wings	70	25	41	66	15
Gordie Howe	Detroit Red Wings	64	29	33	62	68
Red Sullivan	Chicago Black Hawks	69	19	42	61	51
Bert Olmstead	Montreal Canadiens	70	10	48	58	103
Sid Smith	Toronto Maple Leafs	70	33	21	54	14
Ken Mosdell	Montreal Canadiens	70	22	32	54	82
Danny Lewicki	New York Rangers	70	29	24	53	8

Source: NHL

=== Leading goaltenders ===
Note: GP = Games played; Min – Minutes played; GA = Goals against; GAA = Goals against average; W = Wins; L = Losses; T = Ties; SO = Shutouts

Player	Team	GP	MIN	GA	GAA	W	L	T	SO
Harry Lumley	Toronto Maple Leafs	69	4140	133	1.93	23	24	22	8
Terry Sawchuk	Detroit Red Wings	68	4080	132	1.94	40	17	11	12
Jacques Plante	Montreal Canadiens	52	3120	109	2.10	31	13	7	5
Charlie Hodge	Montreal Canadiens	14	820	31	2.27	7	3	4	1
John Henderson	Boston Bruins	45	2652	109	2.47	15	14	15	5
Lorne Worsley	New York Rangers	65	3900	195	3.00	15	33	17	4
Jim Henry	Boston Bruins	27	1548	79	3.06	8	12	6	1
Hank Bassen	Chicago Black Hawks	21	1260	63	3.00	4	9	8	0
Al Rollins	Chicago Black Hawks	44	2640	149	3.39	9	27	8	0

== Coaches ==
- Boston Bruins: Milt Schmidt
- Chicago Black Hawks: Frank Eddolls
- Detroit Red Wings: Jimmy Skinner
- Montreal Canadiens: Dick Irvin
- New York Rangers: Muzz Patrick
- Toronto Maple Leafs: King Clancy

== Debuts ==
The following is a list of players of note who played their first NHL game in 1954–55 (listed with their first team, asterisk(*) marks debut in playoffs):

- Don McKenney, Boston Bruins
- Don Cherry*, Boston Bruins (only NHL game of career)
- Charlie Hodge, Montreal Canadiens
- Jean-Guy Talbot, Montreal Canadiens
- Lou Fontinato, New York Rangers
- Dick Duff, Toronto Maple Leafs

== Last games ==
The following is a list of players of note that played their last game in the NHL in 1954–55 (listed with their last team):

- Gus Bodnar, Boston Bruins
- Milt Schmidt, Boston Bruins
- Jim Henry, Boston Bruins
- Bill Mosienko, Chicago Black Hawks
- Paul Ronty, Montreal Canadiens
- Edgar Laprade, New York Rangers
- Bill Ezinicki, New York Rangers
- Don Cherry, Boston Bruins (Only NHL game of his career)

== Broadcasting ==
This was the third season of Hockey Night in Canada on CBC Television. Coverage included selected Stanley Cup playoff games. Both regular season and playoff games were not broadcast in their entirety until the 1968–69 season, and were typically joined in progress, while the radio version of HNIC aired games in their entirety.

== See also ==
- 1954–55 NHL transactions
- 1954 NHL Intra-League Draft
- List of Stanley Cup champions
- 8th National Hockey League All-Star Game
- National Hockey League All-Star Game
- 1954 in sports
- 1955 in sports
