= Earl Reibel =

Canadian ice hockey player

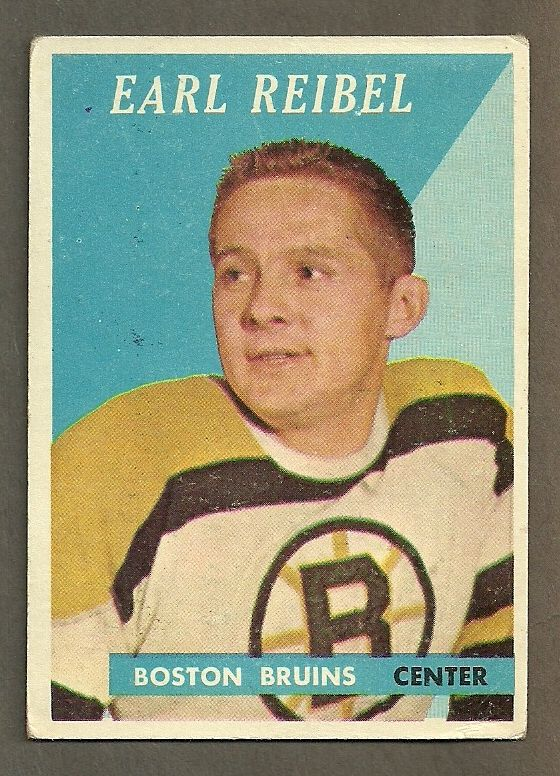
- Born: July 21, 1930 Kitchener, Ontario, Canada
- Died: January 3, 2007 (aged 76) Kitchener, Ontario, Canada
- Height: 5 ft 8 in (173 cm)
- Weight: 160 lb (73 kg; 11 st 6 lb)
- Position: Centre
- Shot: Right
- Played for: AHL; Indianapolis Capitals; Providence Reds; NHL; Detroit Red Wings; Chicago Black Hawks; Boston Bruins
- Playing career: 1951–1961

Earl Lloyd "Dutch" Reibel (July 21, 1930 – January 3, 2007) was a Canadian ice hockey professional player. Reibel played primarily as a centre with the Detroit Red Wings, as well as the Chicago Black Hawks and Boston Bruins.

Reibel played seven season in the National Hockey League. He won two Stanley Cups with Detroit in 1954 and 1955. He was also the only person to dethrone Gordie Howe as the Red Wings' leading scorer between the 1950 and 1964 seasons, surpassing him by 4 points in 1954–55.

He scored twice in the ninth All-Star Game for Detroit against the All-Stars on October 2, 1955. Following the winning goal in the second period, he scored a last-minute empty net goal to complete a 3–1 victory.

In regular season play, Reibel scored 84 goals and 161 assists for 245 points in 409 games. He recorded 6 goals and 14 assists for 20 points in 39 career playoff appearances. Reibel holds the record for most assists by a player in his first NHL game with 4 assists. He was awarded the Lady Byng Trophy in 1956.

Reibel's time in NHL ended in 1959 after play for a year with the Boston Bruins. He spent the remainder of his hockey career playing in the AHL with the Providence Bruins. Reibel retired from hockey in 1961 and returned to Kitchener, Ontario where he worked for Brewers Retail. Reibel died in Kitchener on January 3, 2007, from complications following a stroke.

== Career statistics ==
=== Regular season and playoffs ===
| | | | Regular season | | | | | Playoffs |
| Season | Team | League | GP | G | A | Pts | PIM | GP | G | A | Pts | PIM |
|---|---|---|---|---|---|---|---|---|---|---|---|---|
| 1948–49 | Kitchener Greenshirts | Big-10 Jr. B | — | — | — | — | — | — | — | — | — | — |
| 1949–50 | Windsor Spitfires | OHA | 48 | 53 | 76 | 129 | 14 | 11 | 7 | 14 | 21 | 2 |
| 1950–51 | Omaha Knights | USHL | 32 | 13 | 25 | 38 | 6 | 10 | 0 | 6 | 6 | 2 |
| 1951–52 | Indianapolis Capitals | AHL | 68 | 33 | 34 | 67 | 8 | — | — | — | — | — |
| 1952–53 | Edmonton Flyers | WHL | 70 | 34 | 56 | 90 | 14 | 12 | 6 | 6 | 12 | 4 |
| 1953–54 | Detroit Red Wings | NHL | 69 | 15 | 33 | 48 | 18 | 9 | 1 | 3 | 4 | 0 |
| 1954–55 | Detroit Red Wings | NHL | 70 | 25 | 41 | 66 | 15 | 11 | 5 | 7 | 12 | 2 |
| 1955–56 | Detroit Red Wings | NHL | 68 | 17 | 39 | 56 | 10 | 10 | 0 | 2 | 2 | 2 |
| 1956–57 | Detroit Red Wings | NHL | 70 | 13 | 23 | 36 | 6 | 5 | 0 | 2 | 2 | 0 |
| 1957–58 | Detroit Red Wings | NHL | 29 | 4 | 5 | 9 | 4 | — | — | — | — | — |
| 1957–58 | Chicago Black Hawks | NHL | 40 | 4 | 12 | 16 | 6 | — | — | — | — | — |
| 1958–59 | Boston Bruins | NHL | 63 | 6 | 8 | 14 | 16 | 4 | 0 | 0 | 0 | 0 |
| 1959–60 | Providence Reds | AHL | 69 | 20 | 46 | 66 | 6 | 5 | 0 | 1 | 1 | 0 |
| 1960–61 | Providence Reds | AHL | 43 | 7 | 18 | 25 | 2 | — | — | — | — | — |
| NHL totals | | | 409 | 84 | 161 | 245 | 75 | 39 | 6 | 14 | 20 | 4 |

| Preceded by Sid Smith | Winner of the Lady Byng Trophy; 1956 | Succeeded by Andy Hebenton |
