= Floyd Curry =

Canadian ice hockey player

- Born: August 11, 1925 Chapleau, Ontario, Canada
- Died: September 16, 2006 (aged 81) Montreal, Quebec, Canada
- Height: 5 ft 11 in (180 cm)
- Weight: 175 lb (79 kg; 12 st 7 lb)
- Position: Right wing
- Shot: Right
- Played for: Montreal Canadiens
- Playing career: 1945–1959

Floyd James "Busher" Curry (August 11, 1925 – September 16, 2006) was a Canadian ice hockey right winger.

== Early life and career ==
Curry was born in 1925 in Chapleau, Ontario, and raised in Kirkland Lake by his parents Dalton and Mable Curry. He played junior hockey with the Oshawa Generals and starred for the team. Curry won the Memorial Cup in 1944 with the Generals. The Montreal Canadiens realized his potential and signed him. He played for the Montreal Royals before being brought up to the Canadiens.

Curry played his entire National Hockey League career with the Montreal Canadiens. His career started in 1947 and ended in 1958. During his time with Montreal, Curry won four Stanley Cups in 1953, 1956, 1957, and 1958.

Curry recorded his only career hat trick on October 29, 1951, a night when Princess Elizabeth, soon to become Queen Elizabeth II, was in attendance at the Montreal Forum.

== Later work ==
After retiring as a player, Curry coached the Montreal Royals, then went on to work for the Canadiens' front office for over forty years, starting as director of sales and travel secretary. In the summer of 1968, he was promoted to assistant general manager. During the summer of 1970, Curry became the manager-coach of the Montreal Voyageurs, replacing Al MacNeil, who was promoted to assistant coach (later coach) of the Montreal Canadiens.

MacNeil returned to become manager-coach of the Voyageurs, now the Nova Scotia Voyageurs, in the summer of 1971, after winning the Stanley Cup. Curry returned to the Canadiens as assistant general manager. He remained in that position until 1978 and then stayed on with Montreal as director of scouting for a couple more years. During his time in Montreal in management and scouting, Curry was awarded Stanley Cup rings in 1969, 1973, 1976, 1977, 1978, and 1979. Curry's name was added to the Cup in 1977 and 1978.

== Death ==
Curry died at a Montreal hospital on September 16, 2006. He was survived by his wife of 61 years, June, and his two daughters.

== Career statistics ==
			Regular season					Playoffs
Season	Team	League	GP	G	A	Pts	PIM	GP	G	A	Pts	PIM
1940–41	Kirkland Lake Golden Gate	NOJHA	20	9	4	13	5	—	—	—	—	—
1941–42	Oshawa Generals	OHA-Jr.	24	11	15	26	20	12	9	10	19	15
1941–42	Oshawa Generals	MC	—	—	—	—	—	11	11	6	17	4
1942–43	Oshawa Generals	OHA-Jr.	22	22	24	46	16	10	8	5	13	8
1942–43	Oshawa Generals	MC	—	—	—	—	—	8	7	6	13	2
1943–44	Oshawa Generals	OHA-Jr.	26	22	26	48	13	10	4	7	11	6
1943–44	Oshawa Generals	MC	—	—	—	—	—	10	11	8	19	14
1944–45	Toronto Navy	TNDHL	7	7	7	14	2	7	9	6	15	4
1944–45	Toronto Uptown Tires	TMHL	2	2	1	3	0	2	1	1	2	0
1944–45	Toronto Fuels	TMHL	7	2	2	4	0	—	—	—	—	—
1945–46	Montreal Royals	QSHL	32	22	23	45	8	11	3	6	9	4
1946–47	Montreal Royals	QSHL	40	23	20	43	26	11	3	4	7	4
1946–47	Montreal Royals	AC	—	—	—	—	—	14	6	2	8	14
1947–48	Montreal Canadiens	NHL	31	1	5	6	0	—	—	—	—	—
1947–48	Buffalo Bisons	AHL	14	6	8	14	10	—	—	—	—	—
1948–49	Buffalo Bisons	AHL	67	24	19	43	12	—	—	—	—	—
1948–49	Montreal Canadiens	NHL	—	—	—	—	—	2	0	0	0	2
1949–50	Montreal Canadiens	NHL	49	8	8	16	8	5	1	0	1	2
1949–50	Buffalo Bisons	AHL	24	4	6	10	6	—	—	—	—	—
1950–51	Montreal Canadiens	NHL	69	13	14	27	23	11	0	2	2	2
1951–52	Montreal Canadiens	NHL	64	20	18	38	10	11	4	3	7	6
1952–53	Montreal Canadiens	NHL	68	16	6	22	10	12	2	1	3	2
1953–54	Montreal Canadiens	NHL	70	13	8	21	22	11	4	0	4	4
1954–55	Montreal Canadiens	NHL	68	11	10	21	36	12	8	4	12	4
1955–56	Montreal Canadiens	NHL	70	14	18	32	10	10	1	5	6	12
1956–57	Montreal Canadiens	NHL	70	7	9	16	20	10	3	2	5	2
1957–58	Montreal Canadiens	NHL	42	2	3	5	8	7	0	0	0	2
1958–59	Montreal Royals	QHL	57	9	13	22	40	8	1	3	4	2
1958–59	Rochester Americans	AHL	2	0	0	0	4	—	—	—	—	—
NHL totals			601	105	99	204	147	91	23	17	40	38

== See also ==
- list of NHL players who spent their entire career with one franchise
