= Jack LeClair =

Canadian ice hockey player

- Born: May 30, 1929 Quebec City, Quebec, Canada
- Died: June 14, 2011 (aged 82) Jacksonville, Florida, U.S.
- Height: 6 ft 0 in (183 cm)
- Weight: 194 lb (88 kg; 13 st 12 lb)
- Position: Right wing
- Shot: Left
- Played for: Montreal Canadiens
- Playing career: 1949–1968

Jean Louis "Jackie" LeClair (May 30, 1929 – June 14, 2011) was a Canadian professional ice hockey player who played three seasons in the National Hockey League (NHL) with the Montreal Canadiens from 1954 to 1957. The rest of his career, which lasted from 1949 to 1968, was spent in the minor leagues.

LeClair played his entire National Hockey League career with the Montreal Canadiens. He played three seasons with the Canadiens, from 1954–55 to 1956–57. He is credited with winning the Stanley Cup once, in 1956. In 1957, Jack played 47 games for Montreal, qualifying his name to be engraved on the cup, but he was sent to the minors before the playoffs started so his name was left off the cup. The remainder of his career was spent in the Quebec Senior Hockey League, American Hockey League and Eastern Hockey League. LeClair died on June 14, 2011.

== Career statistics ==
=== Regular season and playoffs ===
			Regular season					Playoffs
Season	Team	League	GP	G	A	Pts	PIM	GP	G	A	Pts	PIM
1946–47	Ottawa St. Pats	OCJHL	22	16	19	35	14	7	21	11	32	2
1947–48	Lethbridge Native Sons	AJHL	16	12	29	41	20	6	7	6	13	20
1947–48	Lethbridge Native Sons	M-Cup	—	—	—	—	—	11	6	4	10	4
1948–49	Quebec Citadelles	QJHL	36	21	27	48	30	13	4	9	13	4
1949–50	Ottawa Senators	QSHL	56	19	42	61	28	7	2	0	2	2
1950–51	Ottawa Senators	QSHL	56	20	22	42	43	7	0	1	1	0
1951–52	Quebec Aces	QSHL	57	25	29	54	22	12	7	4	11	9
1952–53	Ottawa Senators	QSHL	54	22	37	59	27	11	8	2	10	0
1953–54	Ottawa Senators	QSHL	4	3	7	10	7	—	—	—	—	—
1953–54	Pittsburgh Hornets	AHL	52	14	17	31	11	4	0	1	1	2
1954–55	Montreal Canadiens	NHL	59	11	22	33	12	12	5	0	5	2
1955–56	Montreal Canadiens	NHL	54	6	8	14	28	8	1	1	2	4
1955–56	Montreal Royals	QSHL	12	5	10	15	8	—	—	—	—	—
1956–57	Montreal Canadiens	NHL	47	3	10	13	14	—	—	—	—	—
1956–57	Chicoutimi Sagueneens	QSHL	14	8	9	17	4	10	1	10	11	0
1957–58	Chicoutimi Sagueneens	QSHL	48	20	40	68	32	6	0	1	1	4
1958–59	Quebec Aces	QSHL	61	22	42	64	54	—	—	—	—	—
1959–60	Quebec Aces	AHL	72	22	39	61	22	—	—	—	—	—
1960–61	Quebec Aces	AHL	72	22	34	56	12	—	—	—	—	—
1961–62	Quebec Aces	AHL	50	3	11	14	18	—	—	—	—	—
1962–63	Charlotte Checkers	EHL	67	31	67	98	32	10	7	9	16	0
1963–64	Charlotte Checkers	EHL	57	27	56	83	34	3	1	2	3	0
1964–65	Charlotte Checkers/New Haven Blades	EHL	44	23	35	58	78	—	—	—	—	—
1964–65	Knoxville Knights	EHL	—	—	—	—	—	10	4	3	7	24
1965–66	New Haven Blades	EHL	63	32	64	96	87	3	1	0	1	0
1966–67	New Haven Blades	EHL	68	20	55	75	49	—	—	—	—	—
1967–68	Florida Rockets	EHL	62	34	65	99	12	5	0	5	5	4
EHL totals			361	167	179	509	292	31	13	19	32	28
QSHL totals			362	144	238	382	225	53	18	18	36	15
NHL totals			160	20	40	60	54	20	6	1	7	6
