= Ken Mosdell =

Canadian ice hockey player

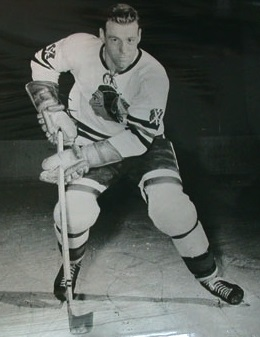
- Born: July 13, 1922 Montreal, Quebec, Canada
- Died: January 5, 2006 (aged 83) Montreal, Quebec, Canada
- Height: 6 ft 1 in (185 cm)
- Weight: 170 lb (77 kg; 12 st 2 lb)
- Position: Centre
- Shot: Left
- Played for: Brooklyn Americans; Chicago Black Hawks; Montreal Canadiens
- Playing career: 1941–1959

Kenneth "Kenny" Mosdell (July 13, 1922 – January 5, 2006) was a Canadian professional ice hockey forward. Mosdell played in the National Hockey League (NHL) from 1941 to 1942, and 1944 to 1959, with the Brooklyn Americans, Montreal Canadiens, and Chicago Black Hawks. He was the last active NHL player to have played for the Brooklyn Americans, and also the last player until 1967 to play for an NHL team that was not part of the Original Six. Mosdell won four Stanley Cups with the Canadiens in 1946, 1953, 1956, and 1959.

Mosdell was born in Montreal, Quebec. His 1954 "Parkies" hockey card lists him as an all-star centre for the Montreal Canadiens, "starting his 11th season with the Canadiens." In the 1953-54 season, he played 67 games and had 22 goals and 24 assists. He was also a "top notch defensive player and has been used many times in penalty killing roles. During the summer he works building boxcars, swinging a sledge hammer all day to keep in top physical shape."

Mosdell died January 5, 2006, in Montreal, Quebec, at the age of 83. His health had declined steadily after suffering a stroke three years previously.

== Career statistics ==
=== Regular season and playoffs ===
			Regular season					Playoffs
Season	Team	League	GP	G	A	Pts	PIM	GP	G	A	Pts	PIM
1939–40	Montreal Jr. Royals	QJHL	12	7	9	16	4	2	0	0	0	0
1939–40	Montreal Royals	QSHL	1	0	0	0	2	—	—	—	—	—
1940–41	Montreal Jr. Royals	QJHL	12	7	10	17	18	2	0	4	4	0
1940–41	Montreal Royals	QSHL	1	0	1	1	0	—	—	—	—	—
1940–41	Montreal Jr. Royals	Mem-Cup	—	—	—	—	—	10	10	16	26	15
1941–42	Brooklyn Americans	NHL	41	7	9	16	16	—	—	—	—	—
1941–42	Springfield Indians	AHL	1	0	0	0	0	—	—	—	—	—
1942–43	Lachine RCAF	QSHL	35	17	18	35	52	12	8	3	11	23
1943–44	Montreal RCAF	QSHL	7	3	7	10	13	—	—	—	—	—
1943–44	Montreal Fairchild	MCHL	6	7	6	13	5	—	—	—	—	—
1944–45	Montreal Canadiens	NHL	31	12	6	18	16	—	—	—	—	—
1945–46	Buffalo Bisons	AHL	43	21	23	44	46	—	—	—	—	—
1945–46	Montreal Canadiens	NHL	13	2	1	3	8	9	4	1	5	6
1946–47	Montreal Canadiens	NHL	54	5	10	15	50	4	2	0	2	4
1947–48	Montreal Canadiens	NHL	23	1	0	1	19	—	—	—	—	—
1948–49	Montreal Canadiens	NHL	60	17	9	26	50	7	1	1	2	4
1949–50	Montreal Canadiens	NHL	67	15	12	27	42	5	0	0	0	12
1950–51	Montreal Canadiens	NHL	66	13	18	31	24	11	1	1	2	4
1951–52	Montreal Canadiens	NHL	44	5	11	16	19	2	1	0	1	0
1952–53	Montreal Canadiens	NHL	63	5	14	19	27	7	3	2	5	4
1953–54	Montreal Canadiens	NHL	67	22	24	46	64	11	1	0	1	4
1954–55	Montreal Canadiens	NHL	70	22	32	54	82	12	2	7	9	8
1955–56	Montreal Canadiens	NHL	67	13	17	30	48	9	1	1	2	2
1956–57	Chicago Black Hawks	NHL	25	2	4	6	10	—	—	—	—	—
1957–58	Montreal Canadiens	NHL	2	0	1	1	0	—	—	—	—	—
1957–58	Montreal Royals	QHL	62	27	42	69	51	7	3	6	9	2
1958–59	Rochester Americans	AHL	2	0	0	0	0	—	—	—	—	—
1958–59	Montreal Royals	QHL	55	20	40	60	77	6	1	4	5	9
1958–59	Montreal Canadiens	NHL	—	—	—	—	—	3	0	0	0	0
1958–59	Montreal Royals	EPHL	61	26	36	62	50	14	3	3	6	12
NHL totals			693	141	168	309	475	80	16	13	29	48
