= 1959 Stanley Cup Final =

1959 ice hockey championship series

	1	2	3	4	5	Total
Montreal Canadiens	5	3	2*	3	5	4
Toronto Maple Leafs	3	1	3*	2	3	1
- * – Denotes overtime period(s)
- Location(s): Montreal: Montreal Forum (1, 2, 5); Toronto: Maple Leaf Gardens (3, 4)
- Coaches: Montreal: Toe Blake; Toronto: Punch Imlach
- Captains: Montreal: Maurice Richard; Toronto: George Armstrong
- Dates: April 9–18, 1959
- Series-winning goal: Marcel Bonin (9:55, second)
- Hall of Famers: Canadiens: Jean Beliveau (1972; did not play); Bernie Geoffrion (1972); Doug Harvey (1973); Tom Johnson (1970); Dickie Moore (1974); Jacques Plante (1978); Henri Richard (1979); Maurice Richard (1961); Maple Leafs: George Armstrong (1975); Johnny Bower (1976); Dick Duff (2006); Tim Horton (1977); Frank Mahovlich (1981); Bert Olmstead (1985); Bob Pulford (1991); Allan Stanley (1981); Coaches: Toe Blake (1966, player); Punch Imlach (1984); Officials: George Hayes (1988); Frank Udvari (1973)

The 1959 Stanley Cup Final was the championship series of the National Hockey League's (NHL) 1958–59 season, and the culmination of the 1959 Stanley Cup playoffs. It was contested between the three-time defending champion Montreal Canadiens and their arch-rival Toronto Maple Leafs. It was the third Stanley Cup Final meeting in the history of the Canadiens–Maple Leafs rivalry. Montreal was making its ninth consecutive appearance in the Finals series. It was Toronto's first appearance since their 1951 win over Montreal. The Canadiens won the series, four games to one, for their fourth straight Cup victory.

== Paths to the Finals ==
Montreal defeated the Chicago Black Hawks in six games to reach the Finals. Toronto defeated the Boston Bruins in seven games to reach the Finals.

== Game summaries ==
Maurice Richard, hampered by injuries, had no points during the playoffs and Jean Beliveau did not play during the Finals as he had suffered a compression fracture during game 3 of the semifinal series against the Chicago Black Hawks.

=== Game one ===
April 9	Toronto Maple Leafs	3–5	Montreal Canadiens	Montreal Forum	Recap

Scoring summary
Period	Team	Goal	Assist(s)	Time	Score
1st	MTL	Henri Richard (8)	Dickie Moore (10) and Jean-Guy Talbot (1)	00:36	1–0 MTL
1st	TOR	Dick Duff (3) – sh	Unassisted	04:53	1–1
1st	TOR	Billy Harris (1)	Tim Horton (3)	06:24	2–1 TOR
1st	MTL	Ralph Backstrom (1)	Claude Provost (1)	15:41	2–2
2nd	MTL	Andre Pronovost (8)	Phil Goyette (3) and Claude Provost (2)	16:28	3–2 MTL
2nd	TOR	Ron Stewart (2)	Carl Brewer (5) and Bert Olmstead (2)	18:26	3–3
3rd	MTL	Marcel Bonin (8)	Henri Richard (4) and Doug Harvey (6)	11:59	4–3 MTL
3rd	MTL	Dickie Moore (4) – pp	Marcel Bonin (4) and Henri Richard (5)	15:02	5–3 MTL
Penalty summary
Period	Team	Player	Penalty	Time	PIM
1st	MTL	Bernie Geoffrion	High-sticking	01:13	2:00
1st	TOR	Bob Pulford	Elbowing	03:25	2:00
1st	TOR	George Armstrong	Interference	07:00	2:00
1st	TOR	Carl Brewer	Hooking	18:51	2:00
1st	MTL	Bernie Geoffrion	Tripping	19:24	2:00
2nd	TOR	Carl Brewer	Hooking	02:51	2:00
2nd	MTL	Tom Johnson	Interference	07:07	2:00
3rd	MTL	Marcel Bonin	Roughing	01:28	2:00
3rd	TOR	Frank Mahovlich	High-sticking	01:28	2:00
3rd	TOR	Bob Turner	High-sticking	07:13	2:00
3rd	TOR	George Armstrong	High-sticking	07:13	2:00
3rd	TOR	Bobby Baun	Kneeing	14:02	2:00
3rd	MTL	Henri Richard	Fighting – major	15:32	5:00
3rd	TOR	Bobby Baun	Fighting – major	15:32	5:00
3rd	TOR	Billy Harris	Hooking	16:54	2:00
3rd	TOR	Billy Harris	Misconduct	16:54	10:00

Shots by period
Team	1	2	3	Total
Toronto	7	9	11	27
Montreal	9	13	14	36

=== Game two ===
April 11	Toronto Maple Leafs	1–3	Montreal Canadiens	Montreal Forum	Recap

Scoring summary
Period	Team	Goal	Assist(s)	Time	Score
1st	MTL	Tom Johnson (1) – pp	Henri Richard (6) and Dickie Moore (11)	05:12	1–0 MTL
2nd	TOR	Ron Stewart (3)	Dave Creighton (1) and Bob Pulford (3)	11:41	1–1
3rd	MTL	Claude Provost (5)	Doug Harvey (7)	05:02	2–1 MTL
3rd	MTL	Claude Provost (6)	Phil Goyette (4) and Doug Harvey (8)	18:33	3–1 MTL
Penalty summary
Period	Team	Player	Penalty	Time	PIM
1st	MTL	Ralph Backstrom	High-sticking	03:32	2:00
1st	TOR	Bobby Baun	Cross-checking	03:32	2:00
1st	TOR	Carl Brewer	High-sticking	03:32	2:00
1st	MTL	Bob Turner	Holding	06:11	2:00
1st	MTL	Claude Provost	Delay of game (smothering puck)	08:11	2:00
1st	TOR	Bert Olmstead	Slashing	08:11	2:00
1st	MTL	Maurice Richard	Tripping	15:15	2:00
1st	TOR	Allan Stanley	Elbowing	18:02	2:00
1st	TOR	Carl Brewer	Spearing	19:50	2:00
2nd	TOR	Dick Duff	Charging	02:58	2:00
2nd	MTL	Jean-Guy Talbot	Hooking	08:25	2:00
2nd	TOR	Bert Olmstead	Holding	19:25	2:00
3rd	MTL	Bernie Geoffrion	High-sticking	06:50	2:00
3rd	MTL	Ralph Backstrom	Roughing	11:56	2:00
3rd	TOR	George Armstrong	Roughing	11:56	2:00
3rd	MTL	Bob Turner	Tripping	15:03	2:00
3rd	TOR	Noel Price	Charging	19:20	2:00

Shots by period
Team	1	2	3	Total
Toronto	6	8	16	30
Montreal	12	17	15	44

=== Game three ===
April 14	Montreal Canadiens	2–3	OT	Toronto Maple Leafs	Maple Leaf Gardens	Recap

Scoring summary
Period	Team	Goal	Assist(s)	Time	Score
1st	TOR	Billy Harris (2)	Allan Stanley (3) and Frank Mahovlich (4)	16:29	1–0 TOR
1st	MTL	Marcel Bonin (9) – pp	Doug Harvey (9) and Bernie Geoffrion (5)	17:31	1–1
2nd	TOR	Bert Olmstead (3)	Bob Pulford (4) and Ron Stewart (3)	17:11	2–1 TOR
3rd	MTL	Dickie Moore (5)	Bob Turner (2) and Donnie Marshall (2)	01:30	2–2
OT	TOR	Dick Duff (4)	George Armstrong (4)	10:06	3–2 TOR
Penalty summary
Period	Team	Player	Penalty	Time	PIM
1st	TOR	Dick Duff	High-sticking	01:32	2:00
1st	MTL	Jean-Guy Talbot	Holding	03:59	2:00
1st	TOR	Gerry Ehman	Holding	06:02	2:00
1st	MTL	Jean-Guy Talbot	Roughing	15:41	2:00
1st	TOR	Gerry Ehman	Roughing	15:41	2:00
1st	TOR	Carl Brewer	Cross-checking	16:38	2:00
1st	TOR	Carl Brewer	Hooking	16:38	2:00
2nd	MTL	Ralph Backstrom	Roughing	04:11	2:00
2nd	TOR	Billy Harris	Roughing	04:11	2:00
2nd	MTL	Dickie Moore	Tripping	18:48	2:00
2nd	MTL	Doug Harvey	Holding	19:03	2:00
2nd	TOR	Carl Brewer	Holding	19:03	2:00
3rd	None				
OT	None				

Shots by period
Team	1	2	3	OT	Total
Montreal	9	7	12	3	31
Toronto	6	8	8	13	35

== Stanley Cup engraving ==
The 1959 Stanley Cup was presented to Canadiens captain Maurice Richard by NHL President Clarence Campbell following the Canadiens 5–3 win over the Maple Leafs in game five.

The following Canadiens players and staff had their names engraved on the Stanley Cup

1958–59 Montreal Canadiens

=== Players ===
Centres

- 4 Jean Beliveau
- 6 Ralph Backstrom
- 8 Kenny Mosdell
- 16 Henri Richard
- 20 Phil Goyette

Wingers

- 5 Bernie Geoffrion (A)
- 9 Maurice "Rocket" Richard (Captain)
- 12 Dickie Moore
- 14 Claude Provost
- 15 Ab McDonald
- 18 Marcel Bonin
- 22 Don Marshall
- 23 Andre Pronovost

Defencemen

- 2 Doug Harvey (A)
- 8 Bill Hicke
- 10 Tom Johnson (A)
- 11 Bob Turner
- 17 Jean-Guy Talbot
- 19 Albert Langlois
- 21 Ian Cushenan

Goaltenders

- 1 Jacques Plante
- 1 Charlie Hodge (Sub)

=== Coaching and administrative staff ===
- Hartland Molson (President/Owner)
- Frank Selke Sr. (Manager), Ken Reardon (Vice President)
- Sam Pollock (Personnel Director), Toe Blake (Coach)
- Hector Dubois (Trainer, Larry Aubut (Asst. Trainer)
- Camile DesRoches*, Frank Selke Jr.* (Publicity Directors)
- * on the team picture, but missing from the Stanley Cup.

=== Stanley Cup engravings ===
- Ken Reardon name was spelt KEN READON VICE PRES missing an "R". Mistake was corrected on the replica cup created in 1992–93.

== See also ==
- 1958–59 NHL season

Preceded by Montreal Canadiens; 1958	Montreal Canadiens; Stanley Cup champions 1959	Succeeded by Montreal Canadiens; 1960
