= 1958–59 Montreal Canadiens season =

NHL hockey team season (won Stanley Cup)

1958–59 Montreal Canadiens
- Stanley Cup champions
- Prince of Wales Trophy winners
- League: 1st NHL
- 1958–59 record: 39–18–13
- Home record: 21–8–6
- Road record: 18–10–7
- Goals for: 258
- Goals against: 158

Team information
- General manager: Frank J. Selke
- Coach: Toe Blake
- Captain: Maurice Richard
- Alternate captains: Doug Harvey; Unknown
- Arena: Montreal Forum

Team leaders
- Goals: Jean Beliveau (45)
- Assists: Dickie Moore (55)
- Points: Dickie Moore (96)
- Penalty minutes: Jean-Guy Talbot (77)
- Wins: Jacques Plante (38)
- Goals against average: Jacques Plante (2.16)

The 1958–59 Montreal Canadiens season was the club's 50th season of play. The Canadiens won the Stanley Cup for the fourth consecutive season, and the 11th time in club history.

== Regular season ==
=== Final standings ===
National Hockey League
		GP	W	L	T	GF	GA	DIFF	Pts
1	Montreal Canadiens	70	39	18	13	258	158	+100	91
2	Boston Bruins	70	32	29	9	205	215	−10	73
3	Chicago Black Hawks	70	28	29	13	197	208	−11	69
4	Toronto Maple Leafs	70	27	32	11	189	201	−12	65
5	New York Rangers	70	26	32	12	201	217	−16	64
6	Detroit Red Wings	70	25	37	8	167	218	−51	58

=== Record vs. opponents ===
1958–59 NHL Records
Team	BOS	CHI	DET	MTL	NYR	TOR
Boston	—	6–7–1	8–5–1	6–6–2	6–5–3	6–6–2
Chicago	7–6–1	—	6–7–1	1–8–5	7–4–3	7–4–3
Detroit	5–8–1	7–6–1	—	1–9–4	6–7–1	6–7–1
Montreal	6–6–2	8–1–5	9–1–4	—	8–5–1	8–5–1
New York	5–6–3	4–7–3	7–6–1	5–8–1	—	5–5–4
Toronto	6–6–2	4–7–3	7–6–1	5–8–1	5–5–4	—

== Schedule and results ==
1958–59 regular season
October

Game	Result	Date	Score	Opponent	Record
1	W	October 9, 1958	3–2	Boston Bruins (1958–59)	1–0–0
2	W	October 11, 1958	2–0	Detroit Red Wings (1958–59)	2–0–0
3	L	October 12, 1958	2–4	@ Boston Bruins (1958–59)	2–1–0
4	W	October 16, 1958	4–3	Toronto Maple Leafs (1958–59)	3–1–0
5	T	October 18, 1958	2–2	New York Rangers (1958–59)	3–1–1
6	W	October 19, 1958	5–3	@ New York Rangers (1958–59)	4–1–1
7	W	October 23, 1958	9–1	Chicago Black Hawks (1958–59)	5–1–1
8	L	October 25, 1958	2–5	Boston Bruins (1958–59)	5–2–1
9	W	October 26, 1958	5–3	@ Detroit Red Wings (1958–59)	6–2–1
10	T	October 28, 1958	5–5	@ Chicago Black Hawks (1958–59)	6–2–2
11	W	October 29, 1958	5–0	@ Toronto Maple Leafs (1958–59)	7–2–2

November

Game	Result	Date	Score	Opponent	Record
12	L	November 1, 1958	2–4	Chicago Black Hawks (1958–59)	7–3–2
13	L	November 8, 1958	5–6	New York Rangers (1958–59)	7–4–2
14	W	November 12, 1958	4–1	@ Toronto Maple Leafs (1958–59)	8–4–2
15	W	November 15, 1958	3–1	@ Chicago Black Hawks (1958–59)	9–4–2
16	L	November 16, 1958	1–2	@ New York Rangers (1958–59)	9–5–2
17	T	November 20, 1958	4–4	Detroit Red Wings (1958–59)	9–5–3
18	W	November 22, 1958	5–1	Chicago Black Hawks (1958–59)	10–5–3
19	L	November 23, 1958	0–2	@ Boston Bruins (1958–59)	10–6–3
20	L	November 26, 1958	3–5	@ New York Rangers (1958–59)	10–7–3
21	W	November 27, 1958	2–1	@ Chicago Black Hawks (1958–59)	11–7–3
22	W	November 29, 1958	6–2	Detroit Red Wings (1958–59)	12–7–3
23	W	November 30, 1958	7–0	@ Detroit Red Wings (1958–59)	13–7–3

December

Game	Result	Date	Score	Opponent	Record
24	T	December 4, 1958	2–2	Toronto Maple Leafs (1958–59)	13–7–4
25	W	December 6, 1958	6–0	New York Rangers (1958–59)	14–7–4
26	W	December 7, 1958	4–1	@ Boston Bruins (1958–59)	15–7–4
27	T	December 13, 1958	2–2	Detroit Red Wings (1958–59)	15–7–5
28	W	December 14, 1958	6–1	@ Detroit Red Wings (1958–59)	16–7–5
29	W	December 18, 1958	4–1	Toronto Maple Leafs (1958–59)	17–7–5
30	W	December 20, 1958	4–1	Chicago Black Hawks (1958–59)	18–7–5
31	W	December 21, 1958	5–0	@ Boston Bruins (1958–59)	19–7–5
32	W	December 25, 1958	4–1	New York Rangers (1958–59)	20–7–5
33	W	December 27, 1958	6–1	Boston Bruins (1958–59)	21–7–5
34	L	December 28, 1958	3–5	@ New York Rangers (1958–59)	21–8–5
35	L	December 31, 1958	0–2	@ Toronto Maple Leafs (1958–59)	21–9–5

January

Game	Result	Date	Score	Opponent	Record
36	T	January 1, 1959	2–2	@ Chicago Black Hawks (1958–59)	21–9–6
37	W	January 3, 1959	5–1	New York Rangers (1958–59)	22–9–6
38	T	January 4, 1959	2–2	@ Detroit Red Wings (1958–59)	22–9–7
39	W	January 8, 1959	3–0	Toronto Maple Leafs (1958–59)	23–9–7
40	W	January 10, 1959	1–0	Chicago Black Hawks (1958–59)	24–9–7
41	T	January 11, 1959	3–3	@ Boston Bruins (1958–59)	24–9–8
42	T	January 17, 1959	3–3	Boston Bruins (1958–59)	24–9–9
43	T	January 18, 1959	1–1	@ Chicago Black Hawks (1958–59)	24–9–10
44	L	January 21, 1959	1–3	@ Toronto Maple Leafs (1958–59)	24–10–10
45	W	January 24, 1959	3–1	New York Rangers (1958–59)	25–10–10
46	W	January 25, 1959	7–3	@ Detroit Red Wings (1958–59)	26–10–10
47	L	January 29, 1959	1–4	Detroit Red Wings (1958–59)	26–11–10
48	T	January 31, 1959	3–3	Chicago Black Hawks (1958–59)	26–11–11

February

Game	Result	Date	Score	Opponent	Record
49	T	February 1, 1959	3–3	@ Chicago Black Hawks (1958–59)	26–11–12
50	L	February 5, 1959	3–6	Toronto Maple Leafs (1958–59)	26–12–12
51	L	February 7, 1959	2–3	Boston Bruins (1958–59)	26–13–12
52	W	February 8, 1959	3–1	@ Detroit Red Wings (1958–59)	27–13–12
53	W	February 11, 1959	5–2	@ Toronto Maple Leafs (1958–59)	28–13–12
54	W	February 14, 1959	2–1	@ Boston Bruins (1958–59)	29–13–12
55	W	February 15, 1959	5–1	@ New York Rangers (1958–59)	30–13–12
56	W	February 19, 1959	7–0	Detroit Red Wings (1958–59)	31–13–12
57	W	February 21, 1959	6–0	Boston Bruins (1958–59)	32–13–12
58	L	February 22, 1959	1–5	@ New York Rangers (1958–59)	32–14–12
59	L	February 25, 1959	2–3	@ Toronto Maple Leafs (1958–59)	32–15–12
60	W	February 28, 1959	6–1	New York Rangers (1958–59)	33–15–12

March

Game	Result	Date	Score	Opponent	Record
61	W	March 5, 1959	2–1	Toronto Maple Leafs (1958–59)	34–15–12
62	W	March 7, 1959	10–2	Detroit Red Wings (1958–59)	35–15–12
63	W	March 8, 1959	2–1	@ Chicago Black Hawks (1958–59)	36–15–12
64	T	March 10, 1959	5–5	@ Detroit Red Wings (1958–59)	36–15–13
65	W	March 11, 1959	6–2	@ Toronto Maple Leafs (1958–59)	37–15–13
66	W	March 14, 1959	8–4	Chicago Black Hawks (1958–59)	38–15–13
67	L	March 15, 1959	3–5	@ Boston Bruins (1958–59)	38–16–13
68	L	March 19, 1959	3–6	Toronto Maple Leafs (1958–59)	38–17–13
69	L	March 21, 1959	3–4	Boston Bruins (1958–59)	38–18–13
70	W	March 22, 1959	4–2	@ New York Rangers (1958–59)	39–18–13

Legend: Win (2 points) Loss (0 points) Tie (1 point)

== Playoffs ==
=== Stanley Cup finals ===
Rocket Richard, hampered by injuries, did not score at all during the playoffs. Toronto was making its first finals appearance since 1951.

Toronto Maple Leafs vs. Montreal Canadiens

Date	Away	Score	Home	Score	Notes
April 9	Toronto	3	Montreal	5	
April 11	Toronto	1	Montreal	3	
April 14	Montreal	2	Toronto	3	OT
April 16	Montreal	3	Toronto	2	
April 18	Toronto	3	Montreal	5	

Montreal won the best-of-seven series 4 games to 1.

== Player statistics ==
=== Regular season ===
==== Scoring ====
Player	Pos	GP	G	A	Pts	PIM
Dickie Moore	LW	70	41	55	96	61
Jean Beliveau	C	64	45	46	91	67
Bernie Geoffrion	RW	59	22	44	66	30
Henri Richard	C	63	21	30	51	33
Marcel Bonin	W	57	13	30	43	38
Ralph Backstrom	C	64	18	22	40	19
Tom Johnson	D	70	10	29	39	76
Maurice Richard	RW	42	17	21	38	27
Claude Provost	RW	69	16	22	38	37
Ab McDonald	LW	69	13	23	36	35
Donnie Marshall	LW	70	10	22	32	12
Phil Goyette	C	63	10	18	28	8
Bob Turner	D	68	4	24	28	66
Andre Pronovost	LW	70	9	14	23	48
Jean-Guy Talbot	D	69	4	17	21	77
Doug Harvey	D	61	4	16	20	61
Ian Cushenan	D	35	1	2	3	28
Albert Langlois	D	48	0	3	3	26
Jacques Plante	G	67	0	1	1	11
Claude Cyr	G	1	0	0	0	0
Charlie Hodge	G	2	0	0	0	0
Claude Pronovost	G	2	0	0	0	0

==== Goaltending ====
Player	MIN	GP	W	L	T	GA	GAA	SO
Jacques Plante	4000	67	38	16	13	144	2.16	9
Charlie Hodge	120	2	1	1	0	6	3.00	0
Claude Cyr	20	1	0	0	0	1	3.00	0
Claude Pronovost	60	2	0	1	0	7	7.00	0
Team:	4200	70	39	18	13	158	2.26	9

=== Playoffs ===
==== Scoring ====
Player	Pos	GP	G	A	Pts	PIM
Dickie Moore	LW	11	5	12	17	8
Marcel Bonin	W	11	10	5	15	4
Bernie Geoffrion	RW	11	5	8	13	10
Doug Harvey	D	11	1	11	12	22
Henri Richard	C	11	3	8	11	13
Claude Provost	RW	11	6	2	8	2
Ralph Backstrom	C	11	3	5	8	12
Tom Johnson	D	11	2	3	5	8
Jean Beliveau	C	3	1	4	5	4
Phil Goyette	C	10	0	4	4	0
Andre Pronovost	LW	11	2	1	3	6
Ab McDonald	LW	11	1	1	2	6
Donnie Marshall	LW	11	0	2	2	2
Bob Turner	D	11	0	2	2	20
Jean-Guy Talbot	D	11	0	1	1	10
Bill Hicke	RW	1	0	0	0	0
Albert Langlois	D	7	0	0	0	4
Ken Mosdell	C	3	0	0	0	0
Jacques Plante	G	11	0	0	0	0
Maurice Richard	RW	4	0	0	0	2

==== Goaltending ====
Player	MIN	GP	W	L	GA	GAA	SO
Jacques Plante	670	11	8	3	26	2.33	0
Team:	670	11	8	3	26	2.33	0

Note:

Pos = Position;GP = Games played; G = Goals; A = Assists; Pts = Points; PIM = Penalty minutes; +/- = Plus/minus; PPG = Power-play goals; SHG = Short-handed goals; GWG = Game-winning goals
Pos = Position;GP = Games played; Min, TOI = Minutes played; W = Wins; L = Losses; T,T/OT = Ties; OTL = Overtime losses; GA = Goals-against; GAA = Goals-against average; SO = Shutouts; SA = Shots against; SV = Shots saved;SV% = Save percentage;

== See also ==
- 1958–59 NHL season
- List of Stanley Cup champions
