= 1958–59 Boston Bruins season =

NHL team season

1958–59 Boston Bruins
- League: 2nd NHL
- 1958–59 record: 32–29–9
- Home record: 21–11–3
- Road record: 11–18–6
- Goals for: 205
- Goals against: 215

Team information
- General manager: Lynn Patrick
- Coach: Milt Schmidt
- Captain: Fernie Flaman
- Alternate captains: Leo Boivin; Leo Labine
- Arena: Boston Garden

Team leaders
- Goals: Don McKenney (32)
- Assists: John Bucyk (36)
- Points: Don McKenney (62)
- Penalty minutes: Fern Flaman (101)
- Wins: Don Simmons (24)
- Goals against average: Harry Lumley (2.45)

The 1958–59 Boston Bruins season was the Bruins' 35th season in the NHL.

== Offseason ==
Claimed Jen-Guy Gendron and Gord Redahl from the New York Rangers, Earl Reibel from Chicago. Traded Allan Stanley to Toronto for Jim Morrison.

== Regular season ==
=== Final standings ===
National Hockey League
		GP	W	L	T	GF	GA	DIFF	Pts
1	Montreal Canadiens	70	39	18	13	258	158	+100	91
2	Boston Bruins	70	32	29	9	205	215	−10	73
3	Chicago Black Hawks	70	28	29	13	197	208	−11	69
4	Toronto Maple Leafs	70	27	32	11	189	201	−12	65
5	New York Rangers	70	26	32	12	201	217	−16	64
6	Detroit Red Wings	70	25	37	8	167	218	−51	58

=== Record vs. opponents ===
1958–59 NHL Records
Team	BOS	CHI	DET	MTL	NYR	TOR
Boston	—	6–7–1	8–5–1	6–6–2	6–5–3	6–6–2
Chicago	7–6–1	—	6–7–1	1–8–5	7–4–3	7–4–3
Detroit	5–8–1	7–6–1	—	1–9–4	6–7–1	6–7–1
Montreal	6–6–2	8–1–5	9–1–4	—	8–5–1	8–5–1
New York	5–6–3	4–7–3	7–6–1	5–8–1	—	5–5–4
Toronto	6–6–2	4–7–3	7–6–1	5–8–1	5–5–4	—

== Schedule and results ==
1958–59 regular season
October

Game	Result	Date	Score	Opponent	Record
1	L	October 9, 1958	2–3	@ Montreal Canadiens (1958–59)	0–1–0
2	T	October 11, 1958	4–4	New York Rangers (1958–59)	0–1–1
3	W	October 12, 1958	4–2	Montreal Canadiens (1958–59)	1–1–1
4	T	October 15, 1958	4–4	@ New York Rangers (1958–59)	1–1–2
5	L	October 18, 1958	2–3	@ Toronto Maple Leafs (1958–59)	1–2–2
6	W	October 19, 1958	4–1	@ Chicago Black Hawks (1958–59)	2–2–2
7	L	October 23, 1958	1–3	@ Detroit Red Wings (1958–59)	2–3–2
8	W	October 25, 1958	5–2	@ Montreal Canadiens (1958–59)	3–3–2
9	T	October 29, 1958	2–2	@ New York Rangers (1958–59)	3–3–3
10	W	October 30, 1958	5–2	Chicago Black Hawks (1958–59)	4–3–3

November

Game	Result	Date	Score	Opponent	Record
11	W	November 1, 1958	3–1	Detroit Red Wings (1958–59)	5–3–3
12	W	November 2, 1958	2–0	Toronto Maple Leafs (1958–59)	6–3–3
13	L	November 8, 1958	3–5	@ Toronto Maple Leafs (1958–59)	6–4–3
14	L	November 9, 1958	1–5	New York Rangers (1958–59)	6–5–3
15	W	November 11, 1958	8–4	@ Chicago Black Hawks (1958–59)	7–5–3
16	L	November 13, 1958	1–3	Detroit Red Wings (1958–59)	7–6–3
17	L	November 15, 1958	2–4	@ New York Rangers (1958–59)	7–7–3
18	T	November 16, 1958	4–4	Toronto Maple Leafs (1958–59)	7–7–4
19	L	November 18, 1958	0–6	@ Detroit Red Wings (1958–59)	7–8–4
20	L	November 19, 1958	2–3	@ Chicago Black Hawks (1958–59)	7–9–4
21	W	November 22, 1958	2–1	Detroit Red Wings (1958–59)	8–9–4
22	W	November 23, 1958	2–0	Montreal Canadiens (1958–59)	9–9–4
23	W	November 27, 1958	3–1	New York Rangers (1958–59)	10–9–4
24	W	November 29, 1958	3–1	@ New York Rangers (1958–59)	11–9–4
25	L	November 30, 1958	1–2	Toronto Maple Leafs (1958–59)	11–10–4

December

Game	Result	Date	Score	Opponent	Record
26	L	December 4, 1958	0–4	@ Detroit Red Wings (1958–59)	11–11–4
27	L	December 6, 1958	1–4	@ Toronto Maple Leafs (1958–59)	11–12–4
28	L	December 7, 1958	1–4	Montreal Canadiens (1958–59)	11–13–4
29	W	December 13, 1958	4–2	Chicago Black Hawks (1958–59)	12–13–4
30	W	December 14, 1958	6–3	Toronto Maple Leafs (1958–59)	13–13–4
31	L	December 17, 1958	2–5	@ Chicago Black Hawks (1958–59)	13–14–4
32	T	December 20, 1958	2–2	@ Toronto Maple Leafs (1958–59)	13–14–5
33	L	December 21, 1958	0–5	Montreal Canadiens (1958–59)	13–15–5
34	W	December 25, 1958	4–2	Chicago Black Hawks (1958–59)	14–15–5
35	L	December 27, 1958	1–6	@ Montreal Canadiens (1958–59)	14–16–5
36	L	December 28, 1958	3–5	@ Detroit Red Wings (1958–59)	14–17–5
37	L	December 31, 1958	3–4	@ New York Rangers (1958–59)	14–18–5

January

Game	Result	Date	Score	Opponent	Record
38	L	January 1, 1959	2–5	New York Rangers (1958–59)	14–19–5
39	W	January 3, 1959	8–2	@ Detroit Red Wings (1958–59)	15–19–5
40	L	January 4, 1959	3–5	@ Chicago Black Hawks (1958–59)	15–20–5
41	L	January 8, 1959	2–4	Chicago Black Hawks (1958–59)	15–21–5
42	L	January 10, 1959	1–4	@ Toronto Maple Leafs (1958–59)	15–22–5
43	T	January 11, 1959	3–3	Montreal Canadiens (1958–59)	15–22–6
44	W	January 15, 1959	3–0	Detroit Red Wings (1958–59)	16–22–6
45	T	January 17, 1959	3–3	@ Montreal Canadiens (1958–59)	16–22–7
46	W	January 18, 1959	4–3	Toronto Maple Leafs (1958–59)	17–22–7
47	W	January 24, 1959	3–1	@ Toronto Maple Leafs (1958–59)	18–22–7
48	L	January 25, 1959	3–8	New York Rangers (1958–59)	18–23–7
49	W	January 31, 1959	5–4	Detroit Red Wings (1958–59)	19–23–7

February

Game	Result	Date	Score	Opponent	Record
50	W	February 1, 1959	6–4	Toronto Maple Leafs (1958–59)	20–23–7
51	L	February 5, 1959	1–2	Chicago Black Hawks (1958–59)	20–24–7
52	W	February 7, 1959	3–2	@ Montreal Canadiens (1958–59)	21–24–7
53	W	February 8, 1959	4–1	New York Rangers (1958–59)	22–24–7
54	W	February 11, 1959	5–3	@ New York Rangers (1958–59)	23–24–7
55	W	February 12, 1959	5–4	Chicago Black Hawks (1958–59)	24–24–7
56	L	February 14, 1959	1–2	Montreal Canadiens (1958–59)	24–25–7
57	T	February 15, 1959	3–3	@ Chicago Black Hawks (1958–59)	24–25–8
58	L	February 21, 1959	0–6	@ Montreal Canadiens (1958–59)	24–26–8
59	W	February 22, 1959	4–1	@ Detroit Red Wings (1958–59)	25–26–8
60	L	February 28, 1959	2–5	@ Chicago Black Hawks (1958–59)	25–27–8

March

Game	Result	Date	Score	Opponent	Record
61	T	March 3, 1959	2–2	@ Detroit Red Wings (1958–59)	25–27–9
62	W	March 5, 1959	3–0	Detroit Red Wings (1958–59)	26–27–9
63	L	March 7, 1959	1–4	@ Toronto Maple Leafs (1958–59)	26–28–9
64	W	March 8, 1959	4–3	Toronto Maple Leafs (1958–59)	27–28–9
65	W	March 12, 1959	5–4	New York Rangers (1958–59)	28–28–9
66	W	March 14, 1959	4–2	Detroit Red Wings (1958–59)	29–28–9
67	W	March 15, 1959	5–3	Montreal Canadiens (1958–59)	30–28–9
68	W	March 18, 1959	5–3	@ New York Rangers (1958–59)	31–28–9
69	W	March 21, 1959	4–3	@ Montreal Canadiens (1958–59)	32–28–9
70	L	March 22, 1959	1–4	Chicago Black Hawks (1958–59)	32–29–9

Legend: Win (2 points) Loss (0 points) Tie (1 point)

== Playoffs ==
This would be the last playoff appearance for the Bruins for the next eight seasons; the team would next make the playoffs in 1968. The Bruins lost a very close seven game semi-final series to Toronto.

After the playoffs were concluded, the Bruins and the New York Rangers embarked on a 23-game European exhibition tour which saw them play in ten European cities. Andy Bathgate of the Rangers could not make the tour so his place was taken by Bobby Hull of the Chicago Blackhawks. Hull scored 50 goals in the 23 exhibition games and blossomed into a star in the next NHL season.

== Player statistics ==
=== Regular season ===
Scoring

Player	Pos	GP	G	A	Pts	PIM
Don McKenney	C	70	32	30	62	20
Vic Stasiuk	LW	70	27	33	60	63
John Bucyk	LW	69	24	36	60	36
Jerry Toppazzini	RW	70	21	23	44	61
Fleming MacKell	C	57	17	23	40	28
Bronco Horvath	C	45	19	20	39	58
Leo Labine	RW	70	9	23	32	74
Doug Mohns	LW/D	47	6	24	30	40
Jim Morrison	D	70	8	17	25	42
Jean-Guy Gendron	LW	60	15	9	24	57
Leo Boivin	D	70	5	16	21	94
Fern Flaman	D	70	0	21	21	101
Norm Johnson	C	39	2	17	19	25
Larry Leach	C	29	4	12	16	26
Dutch Reibel	C	63	6	8	14	16
Larry Hillman	D	55	3	10	13	19
Larry Regan	RW	36	5	6	11	10
Bob Armstrong	D	60	1	9	10	50
Real Chevrefils	LW	30	1	5	6	8
Jack Bionda	D	3	0	1	1	2
Gord Redahl	RW	18	0	1	1	2
Don Keenan	G	1	0	0	0	0
Harry Lumley	G	11	0	0	0	0
Dan Poliziani	RW	1	0	0	0	0
Don Simmons	G	58	0	0	0	4
Ken Yackel	RW	6	0	0	0	2

Goaltending

Player	MIN	GP	W	L	T	GA	GAA	SO
Don Simmons	3480	58	24	26	8	183	3.16	3
Harry Lumley	660	11	8	2	1	27	2.45	1
Don Keenan	60	1	0	1	0	4	4.00	0
Team:	4200	70	32	29	9	214	3.06	4

=== Playoffs ===
Scoring

Player	Pos	GP	G	A	Pts	PIM
Fleming MacKell	C	7	2	6	8	8
Don McKenney	C	7	2	5	7	0
Vic Stasiuk	LW	7	4	2	6	11
Jerry Toppazzini	RW	7	4	2	6	0
John Bucyk	LW	7	2	4	6	6
Jim Morrison	D	6	0	6	6	16
Bronco Horvath	C	7	2	3	5	0
Leo Labine	RW	7	2	1	3	12
Leo Boivin	D	7	1	2	3	4
Larry Leach	C	7	1	1	2	8
Bob Armstrong	D	7	0	2	2	4
Doug Mohns	LW/D	4	0	2	2	12
Jean-Guy Gendron	LW	7	1	0	1	18
Larry Hillman	D	7	0	1	1	0
Jack Bionda	D	1	0	0	0	0
Fern Flaman	D	7	0	0	0	8
Harry Lumley	G	7	0	0	0	4
Dan Poliziani	RW	3	0	0	0	0
Dutch Reibel	C	4	0	0	0	0
Ken Yackel	RW	2	0	0	0	2

Goaltending

Player	MIN	GP	W	L	GA	GAA	SO
Harry Lumley	436	7	3	4	20	2.75	0
Team:	436	7	3	4	20	2.75	0

Note:

Pos = Position;GP = Games played; G = Goals; A = Assists; Pts = Points; PIM = Penalty minutes; +/- = Plus/minus; PPG = Power-play goals; SHG = Short-handed goals; GWG = Game-winning goals
Pos = Position;GP = Games played; Min, TOI = Minutes played; W = Wins; L = Losses; T,T/OT = Ties; OTL = Overtime losses; GA = Goals-against; GAA = Goals-against average; SO = Shutouts; SA = Shots against; SV = Shots saved;SV% = Save percentage;

== Farm teams ==
- Providence Reds
- Victoria Cougars
- Quebec Aces

== See also ==
- 1958–59 NHL season
