= 1958–59 Toronto Maple Leafs season =

NHL hockey team season

1958–59 Toronto Maple Leafs
- League: 4th NHL
- 1958–59 record: 27–32–11
- Home record: 17–13–5
- Road record: 10–19–6
- Goals for: 189
- Goals against: 201

Team information
- General manager: Stafford Smythe (Oct–Nov) interim Punch Imlach (Nov–Apr)
- Coach: Billy Reay (Oct–Nov); Punch Imlach (Nov–Apr)
- Captain: George Armstrong
- Arena: Maple Leaf Gardens

Team leaders
- Goals: Dick Duff (29)
- Assists: Billy Harris (30)
- Points: Dick Duff (53)
- Penalty minutes: Carl Brewer (125)
- Wins: Johnny Bower (15)
- Goals against average: Johnny Bower (2.72)

The 1958–59 Toronto Maple Leafs season was Toronto's 42nd season in the National Hockey League (NHL). The team qualified for the playoffs for the first time since the 1955–56 season, and advanced to the Stanley Cup Finals where they lost to the Montreal Canadiens.

== Regular season ==
=== Final standings ===
National Hockey League
| | | GP | W | L | T | GF | GA | DIFF | Pts |
|---|---|---|---|---|---|---|---|---|---|
| 1 | Montreal Canadiens | 70 | 39 | 18 | 13 | 258 | 158 | +100 | 91 |
| 2 | Boston Bruins | 70 | 32 | 29 | 9 | 205 | 215 | −10 | 73 |
| 3 | Chicago Black Hawks | 70 | 28 | 29 | 13 | 197 | 208 | −11 | 69 |
| 4 | Toronto Maple Leafs | 70 | 27 | 32 | 11 | 189 | 201 | −12 | 65 |
| 5 | New York Rangers | 70 | 26 | 32 | 12 | 201 | 217 | −16 | 64 |
| 6 | Detroit Red Wings | 70 | 25 | 37 | 8 | 167 | 218 | −51 | 58 |

=== Record vs. opponents ===
1958–59 NHL Records
| Team | BOS | CHI | DET | MTL | NYR | TOR |
|---|---|---|---|---|---|---|
| Boston | — | 6–7–1 | 8–5–1 | 6–6–2 | 6–5–3 | 6–6–2 |
| Chicago | 7–6–1 | — | 6–7–1 | 1–8–5 | 7–4–3 | 7–4–3 |
| Detroit | 5–8–1 | 7–6–1 | — | 1–9–4 | 6–7–1 | 6–7–1 |
| Montreal | 6–6–2 | 8–1–5 | 9–1–4 | — | 8–5–1 | 8–5–1 |
| New York | 5–6–3 | 4–7–3 | 7–6–1 | 5–8–1 | — | 5–5–4 |
| Toronto | 6–6–2 | 4–7–3 | 7–6–1 | 5–8–1 | 5–5–4 | — |

== Schedule and results ==
1958–59 regular season
October

| Game | Result | Date | Score | Opponent | Record |
|---|---|---|---|---|---|
| 1 | L | October 11, 1958 | 1–3 | Chicago Black Hawks (1958–59) | 0–1–0 |
| 2 | L | October 12, 1958 | 2–5 | @ Chicago Black Hawks (1958–59) | 0–2–0 |
| 3 | L | October 16, 1958 | 3–4 | @ Montreal Canadiens (1958–59) | 0–3–0 |
| 4 | W | October 18, 1958 | 3–2 | Boston Bruins (1958–59) | 1–3–0 |
| 5 | L | October 19, 1958 | 1–3 | @ Detroit Red Wings (1958–59) | 1–4–0 |
| 6 | W | October 25, 1958 | 3–0 | Detroit Red Wings (1958–59) | 2–4–0 |
| 7 | L | October 26, 1958 | 2–3 | @ New York Rangers (1958–59) | 2–5–0 |
| 8 | L | October 29, 1958 | 0–5 | Montreal Canadiens (1958–59) | 2–6–0 |

November

| Game | Result | Date | Score | Opponent | Record |
|---|---|---|---|---|---|
| 9 | W | November 1, 1958 | 4–3 | New York Rangers (1958–59) | 3–6–0 |
| 10 | L | November 2, 1958 | 0–2 | @ Boston Bruins (1958–59) | 3–7–0 |
| 11 | W | November 8, 1958 | 5–3 | Boston Bruins (1958–59) | 4–7–0 |
| 12 | W | November 9, 1958 | 2–0 | @ Detroit Red Wings (1958–59) | 5–7–0 |
| 13 | L | November 12, 1958 | 1–4 | Montreal Canadiens (1958–59) | 5–8–0 |
| 14 | L | November 15, 1958 | 1–4 | Detroit Red Wings (1958–59) | 5–9–0 |
| 15 | T | November 16, 1958 | 4–4 | @ Boston Bruins (1958–59) | 5–9–1 |
| 16 | L | November 19, 1958 | 4–7 | @ New York Rangers (1958–59) | 5–10–1 |
| 17 | T | November 22, 1958 | 2–2 | New York Rangers (1958–59) | 5–10–2 |
| 18 | T | November 23, 1958 | 3–3 | @ Chicago Black Hawks (1958–59) | 5–10–3 |
| 19 | L | November 26, 1958 | 2–5 | Detroit Red Wings (1958–59) | 5–11–3 |
| 20 | L | November 27, 1958 | 2–3 | @ Detroit Red Wings (1958–59) | 5–12–3 |
| 21 | L | November 29, 1958 | 1–2 | Chicago Black Hawks (1958–59) | 5–13–3 |
| 22 | W | November 30, 1958 | 2–1 | @ Boston Bruins (1958–59) | 6–13–3 |

December

| Game | Result | Date | Score | Opponent | Record |
|---|---|---|---|---|---|
| 23 | T | December 4, 1958 | 2–2 | @ Montreal Canadiens (1958–59) | 6–13–4 |
| 24 | W | December 6, 1958 | 4–1 | Boston Bruins (1958–59) | 7–13–4 |
| 25 | W | December 7, 1958 | 2–0 | @ New York Rangers (1958–59) | 8–13–4 |
| 26 | T | December 10, 1958 | 2–2 | @ Chicago Black Hawks (1958–59) | 8–13–5 |
| 27 | T | December 13, 1958 | 4–4 | New York Rangers (1958–59) | 8–13–6 |
| 28 | L | December 14, 1958 | 3–6 | @ Boston Bruins (1958–59) | 8–14–6 |
| 29 | L | December 18, 1958 | 1–4 | @ Montreal Canadiens (1958–59) | 8–15–6 |
| 30 | T | December 20, 1958 | 2–2 | Boston Bruins (1958–59) | 8–15–7 |
| 31 | L | December 21, 1958 | 1–5 | @ New York Rangers (1958–59) | 8–16–7 |
| 32 | W | December 25, 1958 | 2–0 | @ Detroit Red Wings (1958–59) | 9–16–7 |
| 33 | T | December 27, 1958 | 2–2 | Chicago Black Hawks (1958–59) | 9–16–8 |
| 34 | L | December 28, 1958 | 3–4 | @ Chicago Black Hawks (1958–59) | 9–17–8 |
| 35 | W | December 31, 1958 | 2–0 | Montreal Canadiens (1958–59) | 10–17–8 |

January

| Game | Result | Date | Score | Opponent | Record |
|---|---|---|---|---|---|
| 36 | L | January 3, 1959 | 1–2 | Chicago Black Hawks (1958–59) | 10–18–8 |
| 37 | W | January 4, 1959 | 4–2 | @ New York Rangers (1958–59) | 11–18–8 |
| 38 | W | January 7, 1959 | 3–1 | Detroit Red Wings (1958–59) | 12–18–8 |
| 39 | L | January 8, 1959 | 0–3 | @ Montreal Canadiens (1958–59) | 12–19–8 |
| 40 | W | January 10, 1959 | 4–1 | Boston Bruins (1958–59) | 13–19–8 |
| 41 | T | January 11, 1959 | 6–6 | @ Detroit Red Wings (1958–59) | 13–19–9 |
| 42 | L | January 14, 1959 | 2–3 | New York Rangers (1958–59) | 13–20–9 |
| 43 | W | January 17, 1959 | 2–1 | Detroit Red Wings (1958–59) | 14–20–9 |
| 44 | L | January 18, 1959 | 3–4 | @ Boston Bruins (1958–59) | 14–21–9 |
| 45 | W | January 21, 1959 | 3–1 | Montreal Canadiens (1958–59) | 15–21–9 |
| 46 | L | January 24, 1959 | 1–3 | Boston Bruins (1958–59) | 15–22–9 |
| 47 | W | January 25, 1959 | 4–1 | @ Chicago Black Hawks (1958–59) | 16–22–9 |
| 48 | L | January 31, 1959 | 2–5 | New York Rangers (1958–59) | 16–23–9 |

February

| Game | Result | Date | Score | Opponent | Record |
|---|---|---|---|---|---|
| 49 | L | February 1, 1959 | 4–6 | @ Boston Bruins (1958–59) | 16–24–9 |
| 50 | W | February 5, 1959 | 6–3 | @ Montreal Canadiens (1958–59) | 17–24–9 |
| 51 | W | February 7, 1959 | 4–1 | Detroit Red Wings (1958–59) | 18–24–9 |
| 52 | L | February 8, 1959 | 2–7 | @ Chicago Black Hawks (1958–59) | 18–25–9 |
| 53 | L | February 11, 1959 | 2–5 | Montreal Canadiens (1958–59) | 18–26–9 |
| 54 | W | February 14, 1959 | 5–1 | Chicago Black Hawks (1958–59) | 19–26–9 |
| 55 | L | February 15, 1959 | 2–4 | @ Detroit Red Wings (1958–59) | 19–27–9 |
| 56 | T | February 21, 1959 | 1–1 | New York Rangers (1958–59) | 19–27–10 |
| 57 | L | February 22, 1959 | 1–5 | @ Chicago Black Hawks (1958–59) | 19–28–10 |
| 58 | W | February 25, 1959 | 3–2 | Montreal Canadiens (1958–59) | 20–28–10 |
| 59 | L | February 28, 1959 | 2–4 | Detroit Red Wings (1958–59) | 20–29–10 |

March

| Game | Result | Date | Score | Opponent | Record |
|---|---|---|---|---|---|
| 60 | T | March 1, 1959 | 1–1 | @ New York Rangers (1958–59) | 20–29–11 |
| 61 | W | March 4, 1959 | 5–2 | Chicago Black Hawks (1958–59) | 21–29–11 |
| 62 | L | March 5, 1959 | 1–2 | @ Montreal Canadiens (1958–59) | 21–30–11 |
| 63 | W | March 7, 1959 | 4–1 | Boston Bruins (1958–59) | 22–30–11 |
| 64 | L | March 8, 1959 | 3–4 | @ Boston Bruins (1958–59) | 22–31–11 |
| 65 | L | March 11, 1959 | 2–6 | Montreal Canadiens (1958–59) | 22–32–11 |
| 66 | W | March 14, 1959 | 5–0 | New York Rangers (1958–59) | 23–32–11 |
| 67 | W | March 15, 1959 | 6–5 | @ New York Rangers (1958–59) | 24–32–11 |
| 68 | W | March 19, 1959 | 6–3 | @ Montreal Canadiens (1958–59) | 25–32–11 |
| 69 | W | March 21, 1959 | 5–1 | Chicago Black Hawks (1958–59) | 26–32–11 |
| 70 | W | March 22, 1959 | 6–4 | @ Detroit Red Wings (1958–59) | 27–32–11 |

Legend: Win (2 points) Loss (0 points) Tie (1 point)

== Playoffs ==
=== (2) Boston Bruins vs. (4) Toronto Maple Leafs ===
| March 24 | Toronto Maple Leafs | 1–5 | Boston Bruins | Boston Garden | Recap |
| No scoring | | First period | 07:50 – Jerry Toppazzini (1) |
| Gerry Ehman (1) – 06:07 | | Second period | 10:53 – Leo Labine (1); 11:53 – Vic Stasiuk (1); 18:45 – sh – Larry Leach (1) |
| No scoring | | Third period | 06:18 – Don McKenney (1) |
| Johnny Bower | | Goalie stats | Harry Lumley |

| March 26 | Toronto Maple Leafs | 2–4 | Boston Bruins | Boston Garden | Recap |
| Dick Duff (1) – 15:45 | | First period | 10:00 – Fleming MacKell (1); 12:14 – pp – Fleming MacKell (2) |
| Ron Stewart (1) – 08:09 | | Second period | No scoring |
| No scoring | | Third period | 15:59 – Jean-Guy Gendron (1); 19:15 – Leo Labine (2) |
| Johnny Bower | | Goalie stats | Harry Lumley |

| March 28 | Boston Bruins | 2–3 | OT | Toronto Maple Leafs | Maple Leaf Gardens | Recap |
| Vic Stasiuk (2) – pp – 02:43 | | First period | | 16:21 – Bob Pulford (1) |
| Vic Stasiuk (3) – 17:34 | | Second period | | No scoring |
| No scoring | | Third period | | 17:08 – Gerry Ehman (2) |
| No scoring | | First overtime period | | 05:02 – Gerry Ehman (3) |
| Harry Lumley | | Goalie stats | | Johnny Bower |

| March 31 | Boston Bruins | 2–3 | OT | Toronto Maple Leafs | Maple Leaf Gardens | Recap |
| No scoring | | First period | | 06:58 – pp – Gerry Ehman (4) |
| No scoring | | Second period | | No scoring |
| Jerry Toppazzini (2) – 02:02; Bronco Horvath (1) – 07:20 | | Third period | | 02:46 – Brian Cullen (1) |
| No scoring | | First overtime period | | 11:21 – pp – Frank Mahovlich (1) |
| Harry Lumley | | Goalie stats | | Johnny Bower |

| April 2 | Toronto Maple Leafs | 4–1 | Boston Bruins | Boston Garden | Recap |
| Bert Olmstead (1) – pp – 09:26 | | First period | No scoring |
| Dick Duff (2) – 06:37 | | Second period | No scoring |
| Frank Mahovlich (2) – 00:19; Bob Pulford (2) – sh – 09:02 | | Third period | 11:25 – Jerry Toppazzini (3) |
| Johnny Bower | | Goalie stats | Harry Lumley |

| April 4 | Boston Bruins | 5–4 | Toronto Maple Leafs | Maple Leaf Gardens | Recap |
| Jerry Toppazzini (4) – pp – 07:28; Don McKenney (2) – 09:34 | | First period | 15:13 – pp – Bert Olmstead (2) |
| Johnny Bucyk (1) – 09:57; Johnny Bucyk (2) – 17:19 | | Second period | 03:50 – Frank Mahovlich (3) |
| Bronco Horvath (2) – 12:56 | | Third period | 02:55 – Gerry Ehman (5); 07:37 – sh – Frank Mahovlich (4) |
| Harry Lumley | | Goalie stats | Johnny Bower |

| April 7 | Toronto Maple Leafs | 3–2 | Boston Bruins | Boston Garden | Recap |
| Larry Regan (1) – pp – 05:33 | | First period | 01:11 – pp – Vic Stasiuk (4) |
| No scoring | | Second period | 14:33 – Leo Boivin (1) |
| Bob Pulford (3) – 08:36; Gerry Ehman (6) – 17:27 | | Third period | No scoring |
| Johnny Bower | | Goalie stats | Harry Lumley |

| Toronto won series 4–3 |

=== Stanley Cup Finals ===
| April 9 | Toronto Maple Leafs | 3–5 | Montreal Canadiens | Montreal Forum | Recap |
| Dick Duff (3) – sh – 04:53; Billy Harris (1) – 06:24 | | First period | 00:36 – Henri Richard (3); 15:41 – Ralph Backstrom (1) |
| Ron Stewart (2) – 18:26 | | Second period | 16:28 – Andre Pronovost (2) |
| No scoring | | Third period | 11:59 – Marcel Bonin (8); 15:02 – pp – Dickie Moore (4) |
| Johnny Bower | | Goalie stats | Jacques Plante |

| April 11 | Toronto Maple Leafs | 1–3 | Montreal Canadiens | Montreal Forum | Recap |
| No scoring | | First period | 05:12 – pp – Tom Johnson (1) |
| Ron Stewart (3) – 11:41 | | Second period | No scoring |
| No scoring | | Third period | 05:02 – Claude Provost (5); 18:33 – Claude Provost (6) |
| Johnny Bower | | Goalie stats | Jacques Plante |

| April 14 | Montreal Canadiens | 2–3 | OT | Toronto Maple Leafs | Maple Leaf Gardens | Recap |
| Marcel Bonin (9) – pp – 17:31 | | First period | | 16:29 – Billy Harris (2) |
| No scoring | | Second period | | 17:11 – Bert Olmstead (3) |
| Dickie Moore (5) – 01:30 | | Third period | | No scoring |
| No scoring | | First overtime period | | 10:06 – Dick Duff (4) |
| Jacques Plante | | Goalie stats | | Johnny Bower |

| April 16 | Montreal Canadiens | 3–2 | Toronto Maple Leafs | Maple Leaf Gardens | Recap |
| No scoring | | First period | No scoring |
| No scoring | | Second period | No scoring |
| Ab McDonald (1) – 09:54; Ralph Backstrom (2) – 13:01; Bernie Geoffrion (3) – 15:56 | | Third period | 03:45 – Billy Harris (3); 18:36 – Frank Mahovlich (5) |
| Jacques Plante | | Goalie stats | Johnny Bower |

| April 18 | Toronto Maple Leafs | 3–5 | Montreal Canadiens | Montreal Forum | Recap |
| No scoring | | First period | 04:13 – pp – Ralph Backstrom (3); 13:42 – Bernie Geoffrion (4); 16:26 – Tom Johnson (2) |
| Bob Pulford (4) – pp – 04:27 | | Second period | 09:55 – Marcel Bonin (10); 19:25 – pp – Bernie Geoffrion (5) |
| Frank Mahovlich (6) – 12:07; Bert Olmstead (4) – 16:19 | | Third period | No scoring |
| Johnny Bower | | Goalie stats | Jacques Plante |

| Montreal won series 4–1 |

== Player statistics ==
=== Regular season ===
Scoring

| Player | GP | G | A | Pts | PIM |
|---|---|---|---|---|---|
| Dick Duff | 69 | 29 | 24 | 53 | 73 |
| Billy Harris | 70 | 22 | 30 | 52 | 29 |
| Frank Mahovlich | 63 | 22 | 27 | 49 | 94 |
| Bert Olmstead | 70 | 10 | 31 | 41 | 74 |
| Bob Pulford | 70 | 23 | 14 | 37 | 53 |
| George Armstrong | 59 | 20 | 16 | 36 | 37 |
| Ron Stewart | 70 | 21 | 13 | 34 | 23 |
| Tim Horton | 70 | 5 | 21 | 26 | 76 |
| Gerry Ehman | 38 | 12 | 13 | 25 | 12 |
| Larry Regan | 32 | 4 | 21 | 25 | 2 |
| Carl Brewer | 69 | 3 | 21 | 24 | 125 |
| Allan Stanley | 70 | 1 | 22 | 23 | 47 |
| Brian Cullen | 59 | 4 | 14 | 18 | 10 |
| Barry Cullen | 40 | 6 | 8 | 14 | 17 |
| Dave Creighton | 34 | 3 | 9 | 12 | 4 |
| Bob Baun | 51 | 1 | 8 | 9 | 87 |
| Marc Reaume | 51 | 1 | 5 | 6 | 67 |
| Gary Aldcorn | 5 | 0 | 3 | 3 | 2 |
| Rudy Migay | 19 | 1 | 1 | 2 | 4 |
| Stephen Kraftcheck | 8 | 1 | 0 | 1 | 0 |
| Willie Marshall | 9 | 0 | 1 | 1 | 2 |
| Johnny Bower | 39 | 0 | 0 | 0 | 2 |
| Ed Chadwick | 31 | 0 | 0 | 0 | 0 |
| Bob Nevin | 2 | 0 | 0 | 0 | 2 |
| Noel Price | 28 | 0 | 0 | 0 | 4 |

Goaltending

| Player | MIN | GP | W | L | T | GA | GAA | SA | SV | SV% | SO |
|---|---|---|---|---|---|---|---|---|---|---|---|
| Johnny Bower | 2340 | 39 | 15 | 17 | 7 | 106 | 2.72 | | | | 3 |
| Ed Chadwick | 1860 | 31 | 12 | 15 | 4 | 92 | 2.97 | | | | 3 |
| Team: | 4200 | 70 | 27 | 32 | 11 | 198 | 2.83 | | | | 6 |

=== Playoffs ===
Scoring

| Player | GP | G | A | Pts | PIM |
|---|---|---|---|---|---|
| Gerry Ehman | 12 | 6 | 7 | 13 | 8 |
| Frank Mahovlich | 12 | 6 | 5 | 11 | 18 |
| Bob Pulford | 12 | 4 | 4 | 8 | 8 |
| Dick Duff | 12 | 4 | 3 | 7 | 8 |
| Billy Harris | 12 | 3 | 4 | 7 | 16 |
| Bert Olmstead | 12 | 4 | 2 | 6 | 13 |
| Ron Stewart | 12 | 3 | 3 | 6 | 6 |
| Carl Brewer | 12 | 0 | 6 | 6 | 40 |
| George Armstrong | 12 | 0 | 4 | 4 | 10 |
| Tim Horton | 12 | 0 | 3 | 3 | 16 |
| Allan Stanley | 12 | 0 | 3 | 3 | 2 |
| Larry Regan | 8 | 1 | 1 | 2 | 2 |
| Brian Cullen | 10 | 1 | 0 | 1 | 0 |
| Dave Creighton | 5 | 0 | 1 | 1 | 0 |
| Bob Baun | 12 | 0 | 0 | 0 | 24 |
| Johnny Bower | 12 | 0 | 0 | 0 | 0 |
| Gary Collins | 2 | 0 | 0 | 0 | 0 |
| Barry Cullen | 2 | 0 | 0 | 0 | 0 |
| Rudy Migay | 2 | 0 | 0 | 0 | 0 |
| Noel Price | 5 | 0 | 0 | 0 | 2 |
| Marc Reaume | 10 | 0 | 0 | 0 | 0 |

Goaltending

| Player | MIN | GP | W | L | T | GA | GAA | SA | SV | SV% | SO |
|---|---|---|---|---|---|---|---|---|---|---|---|
| Johnny Bower | 746 | 12 | 5 | 7 | | 38 | 3.06 | | | | 0 |
| Team: | 746 | 12 | 5 | 7 | | 38 | 3.06 | | | | 0 |

== See also ==
- 1958–59 NHL season
