= Larry Leach =

Larry Leach may refer to:

- Larry Leach (ice hockey), Canadian ice hockey player
- Larry Leach (botanist), Rhodesian botanist
