= 1958–59 NHL transactions =

The following is a list of all team-to-team transactions that have occurred in the National Hockey League (NHL) during the 1958–59 NHL season. It lists which team each player has been traded to and for which player(s) or other consideration(s), if applicable.

== Transactions ==
June 3, 1958	To Montreal Canadiens cash	To Detroit Red Wings Gene Achtymichuk; Claude Laforge; Bud MacPherson
June 3, 1958	To Montreal Canadiens cash future considerations^{1} (loan of Norm Johnson)	To Chicago Black Hawks Dollard St. Laurent
June 6, 1958	To Toronto Maple Leafs cash	To Chicago Black Hawks Tod SLoan
July, 1958 (exact date unknown)	To Toronto Maple Leafs cash	To Chicago Black Hawks Jimmy Thomson
September, 1958 (exact date unknown)	To Montreal Canadiens Ian Cushenan	To Chicago Black Hawks cash
September 3, 1958	To Detroit Red Wings Gus Mortson	To Chicago Black Hawks future considerations
October 8, 1958	To Toronto Maple Leafs Allan Stanley	To Boston Bruins Jim Morrison
November 21, 1958	To Toronto Maple Leafs Gord Redahl	To Boston Bruins Bo Elik
December 21, 1958	To Chicago Black Hawks Phil Maloney	To New York Rangers loan of Ray Cyr $7,500 cash future considerations
December 23, 1958	To Toronto Maple Leafs Gerry Ehman	To Detroit Red Wings loan of Willie Marshall cash
April 1, 1959	To Montreal Canadiens cash	To Chicago Black Hawks Bill Hay

Notes

1. Trade completed on February 20, 1959.
