= Daniel Poliziani (b. 1935) =

Canadian ice hockey player (1935–2019)

- Born: January 8, 1935 New Waterford, Nova Scotia, Canada
- Died: November 30, 2019 (aged 84) Canandaigua, New York, U.S.
- Height: 5 ft 11 in (180 cm)
- Weight: 158 lb (72 kg; 11 st 4 lb)
- Position: Right wing
- Shot: Right
- Played for: Boston Bruins
- Playing career: 1955–1965

Daniel Joseph Poliziani (January 8, 1935 – November 30, 2019) was a Canadian professional ice hockey right winger.

== Early life ==
Poliziani was born to Italian immigrants in New Waterford, Nova Scotia, in 1935. He began playing hockey in the early-1940s when his family moved to Hamilton, Ontario, following his father's death.

== Career ==
Poliziani played four National Hockey League games (one regular season and three playoff contests) for the Boston Bruins during the 1958–59 season. The rest of his career, which lasted from 1955 to 1965, was mainly spent in the minor American Hockey League.

== Personal life ==
Poliziani died in November 2019 at the age of 84.

== Career statistics ==
=== Regular season and playoffs ===
			Regular season					Playoffs
Season	Team	League	GP	G	A	Pts	PIM	GP	G	A	Pts	PIM
1952–53	St. Catharines Teepees	OHA	54	9	13	22	18	3	0	2	2	2
1953–54	St. Catharines Teepees	OHA	20	3	6	9	10	—	—	—	—	—
1953–54	Barrie Flyers	OHA	35	24	27	51	29	—	—	—	—	—
1954–55	Barrie Flyers	OHA	34	18	38	56	105	—	—	—	—	—
1954–55	Cleveland Barons	AHL	2	1	0	0	0	—	—	—	—	—
1955–56	Cleveland Barons	AHL	5	2	1	3	0	—	—	—	—	—
1955–56	Quebec Aces	QSHL	42	14	16	30	62	5	0	2	2	4
1956–57	Cleveland Barons	AHL	58	21	25	46	74	7	2	1	3	0
1957–58	Cleveland Barons	AHL	65	23	19	42	60	6	5	2	7	6
1958–59	Boston Bruins	NHL	1	0	0	0	0	3	0	0	0	0
1958–59	Providence Reds	AHL	59	18	21	39	54	—	—	—	—	—
1959–60	Providence Reds	AHL	60	30	31	61	52	5	1	4	5	16
1960–61	Providence Reds	AHL	63	20	43	63	65	—	—	—	—	—
1961–62	Providence Reds	AHL	57	14	37	51	57	3	1	1	2	2
1962–63	Providence Reds	AHL	50	13	17	30	27	6	1	6	7	16
1963–64	Hershey Bears	AHL	66	14	20	34	36	5	2	1	3	4
1964–65	Hershey Bears	AHL	45	14	12	26	44	1	0	0	0	2
AHL totals			530	170	226	396	469	33	12	15	27	46
NHL totals			1	0	0	0	0	3	0	0	0	0
