= 1958–59 Chicago Black Hawks season =

NHL ice hockey team season

1958–59 Chicago Black Hawks
- League: 3rd NHL
- 1958–59 record: 28–29–13
- Home record: 14–12–9
- Road record: 14–17–4
- Goals for: 197
- Goals against: 208

Team information
- General manager: Tommy Ivan
- Coach: Rudy Pilous
- Captain: Ed Litzenberger
- Alternate captains: Ron Murphy; Pierre Pilote
- Arena: Chicago Stadium

Team leaders
- Goals: Ed Litzenberger (33)
- Assists: Ed Litzenberger (44)
- Points: Ed Litzenberger (77)
- Penalty minutes: Ted Lindsay (184)
- Wins: Glenn Hall (28)
- Goals against average: Glenn Hall (2.97)

The 1958–59 Chicago Black Hawks season was the team's 33rd season in the NHL, and the club was coming off of a fifth-place finish in 1957–58, as they finished the year 24–39–7, earning 55 points, which was their highest point total since last making the playoffs in 1952–53.

It was a quiet off-season for the Black Hawks, who made no major moves. The team named Ed Litzenberger the new team captain, as the spot was left vacant for the 1957–58 season.

Chicago would get off to a good start, going unbeaten in their first four games, before going on a six-game winless streak to drop them under .500. The Black Hawks would hover around the .500 mark all season long, and as a result, the team set a club record with 28 victories, and tied the club record by earning 69 points, as the Black Hawks qualified for the post-season for the first time since 1952–53. Chicago finished in third place, which was their highest finish in the standings since finishing third in the 1945–46 season.

Offensively, Chicago was led by Ed Litzenberger, who led the club with 33 goals and 77 points. His 77 points tied a club record originally set by Max Bentley in 1943–44. Tod Sloan finished with 27 goals and 62 points, while Ted Lindsay rebounded from a poor 1957–58 season by scoring 22 goals and 58 points, while leading the NHL with 181 penalty minutes. Bobby Hull had a solid season, scoring 18 goals and 50 points. On the blueline, Pierre Pilote led the way, scoring 7 goals and 37 points, while Moose Vasko chipped in with 6 goals and 10 assists for 16 points.

In goal, Glenn Hall had all the playing time for the second straight season, as he won a club record 28 games and posted a 2.97 GAA, along with a shutout.

Chicago would face the Montreal Canadiens in the best of seven NHL semi-final. The Canadiens finished the year on top of the NHL standings with 91 points, and had won the Stanley Cup three years in a row. The series opened at the Montreal Forum, and the Canadiens took control of the series, winning the opening two games by scores of 4–2 and 5–1 to take the 2–0 series lead. The series moved to Chicago Stadium for the next two games, and the Black Hawks responded, winning their first playoff games since 1953, as they defeated Montreal 4–2 and 3–2 to even the series up at two games a piece. The series returned to Montreal for the fifth game, and the heavily favored Canadiens put the Black Hawks on the brink of elimination with a 4–2 win to take a 3–2 series lead. Montreal ended the series in the sixth game in Chicago, hanging on for a 5–4 victory to win the series.

== Season standings ==
National Hockey League
		GP	W	L	T	GF	GA	DIFF	Pts
1	Montreal Canadiens	70	39	18	13	258	158	+100	91
2	Boston Bruins	70	32	29	9	205	215	−10	73
3	Chicago Black Hawks	70	28	29	13	197	208	−11	69
4	Toronto Maple Leafs	70	27	32	11	189	201	−12	65
5	New York Rangers	70	26	32	12	201	217	−16	64
6	Detroit Red Wings	70	25	37	8	167	218	−51	58

=== Record vs. opponents ===
1958–59 NHL Records
Team	BOS	CHI	DET	MTL	NYR	TOR
Boston	—	6–7–1	8–5–1	6–6–2	6–5–3	6–6–2
Chicago	7–6–1	—	6–7–1	1–8–5	7–4–3	7–4–3
Detroit	5–8–1	7–6–1	—	1–9–4	6–7–1	6–7–1
Montreal	6–6–2	8–1–5	9–1–4	—	8–5–1	8–5–1
New York	5–6–3	4–7–3	7–6–1	5–8–1	—	5–5–4
Toronto	6–6–2	4–7–3	7–6–1	5–8–1	5–5–4	—

== Schedule and results ==
=== Regular season ===
1958–59 regular season
October

Game	Date	Visitor	Score	Home	Record	Points
1	October 8	New York Rangers	1–1	Chicago Black Hawks	0–0–1	1
2	October 11	Chicago Black Hawks	3–1	Toronto Maple Leafs	1–0–1	3
3	October 12	Toronto Maple Leafs	2–5	Chicago Black Hawks	2–0–1	5
4	October 16	Chicago Black Hawks	7–2	Detroit Red Wings	3–0–1	7
5	October 18	Detroit Red Wings	3–1	Chicago Black Hawks	3–1–1	7
6	October 19	Boston Bruins	4–1	Chicago Black Hawks	3–2–1	7
7	October 23	Chicago Black Hawks	1–9	Montreal Canadiens	3–3–1	7
8	October 25	Chicago Black Hawks	2–6	New York Rangers	3–4–1	7
9	October 28	Montreal Canadiens	5–5	Chicago Black Hawks	3–4–2	8
10	October 30	Chicago Black Hawks	2–5	Boston Bruins	3–5–2	8

November

Game	Date	Visitor	Score	Home	Record	Points
11	November 1	Chicago Black Hawks	4–2	Montreal Canadiens	4–5–2	10
12	November 4	New York Rangers	2–4	Chicago Black Hawks	5–5–2	12
13	November 8	Chicago Black Hawks	4–3	Detroit Red Wings	6–5–2	14
14	November 11	Boston Bruins	8–4	Chicago Black Hawks	6–6–2	14
15	November 15	Montreal Canadiens	3–1	Chicago Black Hawks	6–7–2	14
16	November 16	Detroit Red Wings	2–3	Chicago Black Hawks	7–7–2	16
17	November 19	Boston Bruins	2–3	Chicago Black Hawks	8–7–2	18
18	November 22	Chicago Black Hawks	1–5	Montreal Canadiens	8–8–2	18
19	November 23	Toronto Maple Leafs	3–3	Chicago Black Hawks	8–8–3	19
20	November 27	Montreal Canadiens	2–1	Chicago Black Hawks	8–9–3	19
21	November 29	Chicago Black Hawks	2–1	Toronto Maple Leafs	9–9–3	21
22	November 30	New York Rangers	2–2	Chicago Black Hawks	9–9–4	22

December

Game	Date	Visitor	Score	Home	Record	Points
23	December 3	Chicago Black Hawks	2–4	New York Rangers	9–10–4	22
24	December 6	Detroit Red Wings	4–3	Chicago Black Hawks	9–11–4	22
25	December 7	Chicago Black Hawks	2–2	Detroit Red Wings	9–11–5	23
26	December 10	Toronto Maple Leafs	2–2	Chicago Black Hawks	9–11–6	24
27	December 13	Chicago Black Hawks	2–4	Boston Bruins	9–12–6	24
28	December 14	Chicago Black Hawks	3–3	New York Rangers	9–12–7	25
29	December 17	Boston Bruins	2–5	Chicago Black Hawks	10–12–7	27
30	December 20	Chicago Black Hawks	1–4	Montreal Canadiens	10–13–7	27
31	December 21	Detroit Red Wings	2–4	Chicago Black Hawks	11–13–7	29
32	December 25	Chicago Black Hawks	2–4	Boston Bruins	11–14–7	29
33	December 27	Chicago Black Hawks	2–2	Toronto Maple Leafs	11–14–8	30
34	December 28	Toronto Maple Leafs	3–4	Chicago Black Hawks	12–14–8	32
35	December 31	Chicago Black Hawks	4–2	Detroit Red Wings	13–14–8	34

January

Game	Date	Visitor	Score	Home	Record	Points
36	January 1	Montreal Canadiens	2–2	Chicago Black Hawks	13–14–9	35
37	January 3	Chicago Black Hawks	2–1	Toronto Maple Leafs	14–14–9	37
38	January 4	Boston Bruins	3–5	Chicago Black Hawks	15–14–9	39
39	January 7	Chicago Black Hawks	4–0	New York Rangers	16–14–9	41
40	January 8	Chicago Black Hawks	4–2	Boston Bruins	17–14–9	43
41	January 10	Chicago Black Hawks	0–1	Montreal Canadiens	17–15–9	43
42	January 11	New York Rangers	4–3	Chicago Black Hawks	17–16–9	43
43	January 17	New York Rangers	1–7	Chicago Black Hawks	18–16–9	45
44	January 18	Montreal Canadiens	1–1	Chicago Black Hawks	18–16–10	46
45	January 21	Detroit Red Wings	3–2	Chicago Black Hawks	18–17–10	46
46	January 24	Chicago Black Hawks	0–2	Detroit Red Wings	18–18–10	46
47	January 25	Toronto Maple Leafs	4–1	Chicago Black Hawks	18–19–10	46
48	January 28	Chicago Black Hawks	3–1	New York Rangers	19–19–10	48
49	January 31	Chicago Black Hawks	3–3	Montreal Canadiens	19–19–11	49

February

Game	Date	Visitor	Score	Home	Record	Points
50	February 1	Montreal Canadiens	3–3	Chicago Black Hawks	19–19–12	50
51	February 5	Chicago Black Hawks	2–1	Boston Bruins	20–19–12	52
52	February 7	Chicago Black Hawks	6–3	New York Rangers	21–19–12	54
53	February 8	Toronto Maple Leafs	2–7	Chicago Black Hawks	22–19–12	56
54	February 12	Chicago Black Hawks	4–5	Boston Bruins	22–20–12	56
55	February 14	Chicago Black Hawks	1–5	Toronto Maple Leafs	22–21–12	56
56	February 15	Boston Bruins	3–3	Chicago Black Hawks	22–21–13	57
57	February 18	New York Rangers	2–4	Chicago Black Hawks	23–21–13	59
58	February 21	Chicago Black Hawks	2–5	Detroit Red Wings	23–22–13	59
59	February 22	Toronto Maple Leafs	1–5	Chicago Black Hawks	24–22–13	61
60	February 28	Boston Bruins	2–5	Chicago Black Hawks	25–22–13	63

March

Game	Date	Visitor	Score	Home	Record	Points
61	March 1	Detroit Red Wings	1–3	Chicago Black Hawks	26–22–13	65
62	March 4	Chicago Black Hawks	2–5	Toronto Maple Leafs	26–23–13	65
63	March 7	New York Rangers	6–1	Chicago Black Hawks	26–24–13	65
64	March 8	Montreal Canadiens	2–1	Chicago Black Hawks	26–25–13	65
65	March 11	Chicago Black Hawks	5–3	New York Rangers	27–25–13	67
66	March 14	Chicago Black Hawks	4–8	Montreal Canadiens	27–26–13	67
67	March 15	Detroit Red Wings	4–1	Chicago Black Hawks	27–27–13	67
68	March 17	Chicago Black Hawks	0–2	Detroit Red Wings	27–28–13	67
69	March 21	Chicago Black Hawks	1–5	Toronto Maple Leafs	27–29–13	67
70	March 22	Chicago Black Hawks	4–1	Boston Bruins	28–29–13	69

Legend: Win (2 points) Loss (0 points) Tie (1 point)

=== Playoffs ===
1959 Stanley Cup playoffs
Semifinals vs. (1) Montreal Canadiens – Canadiens win 4–2

Game	Date	Visitor	Score	Home	Series
1	March 24	Chicago Black Hawks	2–4	Montreal Canadiens	0–1
2	March 26	Chicago Black Hawks	1–5	Montreal Canadiens	0–2
3	March 28	Montreal Canadiens	2–4	Chicago Black Hawks	1–2
4	March 31	Montreal Canadiens	1–3	Chicago Black Hawks	2–2
5	April 2	Chicago Black Hawks	2–4	Montreal Canadiens	2–3
6	April 4	Montreal Canadiens	5–4	Chicago Black Hawks	2–4

Legend: Win Loss

== Season stats ==
=== Scoring leaders ===
Player	GP	G	A	Pts	PIM
Ed Litzenberger	70	33	44	77	37
Tod Sloan	59	27	35	62	79
Ted Lindsay	70	22	36	58	184
Bobby Hull	70	18	32	50	50
Ron Murphy	59	17	30	47	52

=== Goaltending ===
Player	GP	TOI	W	L	T	GA	SO	GAA
Glenn Hall	70	4200	28	29	13	208	1	2.97

== Playoff stats ==
=== Scoring leaders ===
Player	GP	G	A	Pts	PIM
Ed Litzenberger	6	3	5	8	8
Tod Sloan	6	3	5	8	0
Ted Lindsay	6	2	4	6	13
Eric Nesterenko	6	2	2	4	8
Glen Skov	6	2	1	3	4

=== Goaltending ===
Player	GP	TOI	W	L	GA	SO	GAA
Glenn Hall	6	360	2	4	21	0	3.50

== Sources ==
- Hockey-Reference
- National Hockey League Guide & Record Book 2007
