= 1958–59 Detroit Red Wings season =

Sports season

1958–59 Detroit Red Wings
- League: 6th NHL
- 1958–59 record: 25–37–8
- Home record: 13–17–5
- Road record: 12–20–3
- Goals for: 167
- Goals against: 218

Team information
- General manager: Jack Adams
- Coach: Sid Abel
- Captain: Gordie Howe
- Alternate captains: Red Kelly
- Arena: Detroit Olympia

Team leaders
- Goals: Gordie Howe (32)
- Assists: Gordie Howe (46)
- Points: Gordie Howe (78)
- Penalty minutes: Pete Goegan (109)
- Wins: Terry Sawchuk (23)
- Goals against average: Terry Sawchuk (3.09)

The 1958–59 Detroit Red Wings season was the Red Wings' 33rd season. The team missed the playoffs for the first time since the 1937–38 season it is also the first time they finished last in the league since the 1927–28 season.

== Regular season ==
=== Final standings ===
National Hockey League
		GP	W	L	T	GF	GA	DIFF	Pts
1	Montreal Canadiens	70	39	18	13	258	158	+100	91
2	Boston Bruins	70	32	29	9	205	215	−10	73
3	Chicago Black Hawks	70	28	29	13	197	208	−11	69
4	Toronto Maple Leafs	70	27	32	11	189	201	−12	65
5	New York Rangers	70	26	32	12	201	217	−16	64
6	Detroit Red Wings	70	25	37	8	167	218	−51	58

=== Record vs. opponents ===
1958–59 NHL Records
Team	BOS	CHI	DET	MTL	NYR	TOR
Boston	—	6–7–1	8–5–1	6–6–2	6–5–3	6–6–2
Chicago	7–6–1	—	6–7–1	1–8–5	7–4–3	7–4–3
Detroit	5–8–1	7–6–1	—	1–9–4	6–7–1	6–7–1
Montreal	6–6–2	8–1–5	9–1–4	—	8–5–1	8–5–1
New York	5–6–3	4–7–3	7–6–1	5–8–1	—	5–5–4
Toronto	6–6–2	4–7–3	7–6–1	5–8–1	5–5–4	—

== Schedule and results ==
1958–59 regular season
October

Game	Result	Date	Score	Opponent	Record
1	L	October 11, 1958	0–2	@ Montreal Canadiens (1958–59)	0–1–0
2	W	October 12, 1958	3–0	New York Rangers (1958–59)	1–1–0
3	L	October 16, 1958	2–7	Chicago Black Hawks (1958–59)	1–2–0
4	W	October 18, 1958	3–1	@ Chicago Black Hawks (1958–59)	2–2–0
5	W	October 19, 1958	3–1	Toronto Maple Leafs (1958–59)	3–2–0
6	W	October 23, 1958	3–1	Boston Bruins (1958–59)	4–2–0
7	L	October 25, 1958	0–3	@ Toronto Maple Leafs (1958–59)	4–3–0
8	L	October 26, 1958	3–5	Montreal Canadiens (1958–59)	4–4–0
9	W	October 30, 1958	4–1	New York Rangers (1958–59)	5–4–0

November

Game	Result	Date	Score	Opponent	Record
10	L	November 1, 1958	1–3	@ Boston Bruins (1958–59)	5–5–0
11	W	November 2, 1958	2–1	@ New York Rangers (1958–59)	6–5–0
12	L	November 8, 1958	3–4	Chicago Black Hawks (1958–59)	6–6–0
13	L	November 9, 1958	0–2	Toronto Maple Leafs (1958–59)	6–7–0
14	W	November 13, 1958	3–1	@ Boston Bruins (1958–59)	7–7–0
15	W	November 15, 1958	4–1	@ Toronto Maple Leafs (1958–59)	8–7–0
16	L	November 16, 1958	2–3	@ Chicago Black Hawks (1958–59)	8–8–0
17	W	November 18, 1958	6–0	Boston Bruins (1958–59)	9–8–0
18	T	November 20, 1958	4–4	@ Montreal Canadiens (1958–59)	9–8–1
19	L	November 22, 1958	1–2	@ Boston Bruins (1958–59)	9–9–1
20	W	November 23, 1958	3–1	@ New York Rangers (1958–59)	10–9–1
21	W	November 26, 1958	5–2	@ Toronto Maple Leafs (1958–59)	11–9–1
22	W	November 27, 1958	3–2	Toronto Maple Leafs (1958–59)	12–9–1
23	L	November 29, 1958	2–6	@ Montreal Canadiens (1958–59)	12–10–1
24	L	November 30, 1958	0–7	Montreal Canadiens (1958–59)	12–11–1

December

Game	Result	Date	Score	Opponent	Record
25	W	December 4, 1958	4–0	Boston Bruins (1958–59)	13–11–1
26	W	December 6, 1958	4–3	@ Chicago Black Hawks (1958–59)	14–11–1
27	T	December 7, 1958	2–2	Chicago Black Hawks (1958–59)	14–11–2
28	W	December 10, 1958	2–1	@ New York Rangers (1958–59)	15–11–2
29	T	December 13, 1958	2–2	@ Montreal Canadiens (1958–59)	15–11–3
30	L	December 14, 1958	1–6	Montreal Canadiens (1958–59)	15–12–3
31	L	December 18, 1958	0–2	New York Rangers (1958–59)	15–13–3
32	L	December 21, 1958	2–4	@ Chicago Black Hawks (1958–59)	15–14–3
33	L	December 25, 1958	0–2	Toronto Maple Leafs (1958–59)	15–15–3
34	W	December 28, 1958	5–3	Boston Bruins (1958–59)	16–15–3
35	L	December 31, 1958	2–4	Chicago Black Hawks (1958–59)	16–16–3

January

Game	Result	Date	Score	Opponent	Record
36	L	January 3, 1959	2–8	Boston Bruins (1958–59)	16–17–3
37	T	January 4, 1959	2–2	Montreal Canadiens (1958–59)	16–17–4
38	L	January 7, 1959	1–3	@ Toronto Maple Leafs (1958–59)	16–18–4
39	T	January 10, 1959	3–3	@ New York Rangers (1958–59)	16–18–5
40	T	January 11, 1959	6–6	Toronto Maple Leafs (1958–59)	16–18–6
41	L	January 15, 1959	0–3	@ Boston Bruins (1958–59)	16–19–6
42	L	January 17, 1959	1–2	@ Toronto Maple Leafs (1958–59)	16–20–6
43	L	January 18, 1959	2–4	New York Rangers (1958–59)	16–21–6
44	W	January 21, 1959	3–2	@ Chicago Black Hawks (1958–59)	17–21–6
45	W	January 24, 1959	2–0	Chicago Black Hawks (1958–59)	18–21–6
46	L	January 25, 1959	3–7	Montreal Canadiens (1958–59)	18–22–6
47	W	January 29, 1959	4–1	@ Montreal Canadiens (1958–59)	19–22–6
48	L	January 31, 1959	4–5	@ Boston Bruins (1958–59)	19–23–6

February

Game	Result	Date	Score	Opponent	Record
49	L	February 1, 1959	4–5	@ New York Rangers (1958–59)	19–24–6
50	L	February 5, 1959	0–5	New York Rangers (1958–59)	19–25–6
51	L	February 7, 1959	1–4	@ Toronto Maple Leafs (1958–59)	19–26–6
52	L	February 8, 1959	1–3	Montreal Canadiens (1958–59)	19–27–6
53	W	February 12, 1959	1–0	New York Rangers (1958–59)	20–27–6
54	W	February 15, 1959	4–2	Toronto Maple Leafs (1958–59)	21–27–6
55	L	February 19, 1959	0–7	@ Montreal Canadiens (1958–59)	21–28–6
56	W	February 21, 1959	5–2	Chicago Black Hawks (1958–59)	22–28–6
57	L	February 22, 1959	1–4	Boston Bruins (1958–59)	22–29–6
58	L	February 25, 1959	3–6	@ New York Rangers (1958–59)	22–30–6
59	W	February 28, 1959	4–2	@ Toronto Maple Leafs (1958–59)	23–30–6

March

Game	Result	Date	Score	Opponent	Record
60	L	March 1, 1959	1–3	@ Chicago Black Hawks (1958–59)	23–31–6
61	T	March 3, 1959	2–2	Boston Bruins (1958–59)	23–31–7
62	L	March 5, 1959	0–3	@ Boston Bruins (1958–59)	23–32–7
63	L	March 7, 1959	2–10	@ Montreal Canadiens (1958–59)	23–33–7
64	L	March 8, 1959	2–4	@ New York Rangers (1958–59)	23–34–7
65	T	March 10, 1959	5–5	Montreal Canadiens (1958–59)	23–34–8
66	L	March 14, 1959	2–4	@ Boston Bruins (1958–59)	23–35–8
67	W	March 15, 1959	4–1	@ Chicago Black Hawks (1958–59)	24–35–8
68	W	March 17, 1959	2–0	Chicago Black Hawks (1958–59)	25–35–8
69	L	March 21, 1959	2–5	New York Rangers (1958–59)	25–36–8
70	L	March 22, 1959	4–6	Toronto Maple Leafs (1958–59)	25–37–8

Legend: Win (2 points) Loss (0 points) Tie (1 point)

== Player statistics ==
=== Regular season ===
Scoring

Player	Pos	GP	G	A	Pts	PIM
Gordie Howe	RW	70	32	46	78	57
Norm Ullman	C	69	22	36	58	42
Alex Delvecchio	C/LW	70	19	35	54	6
Marcel Pronovost	D	69	11	21	32	44
Jack McIntyre	RW	55	15	14	29	14
Johnny Wilson	LW	70	11	17	28	18
Len Lunde	C	68	14	12	26	15
Nick Mickoski	LW	66	11	15	26	20
Red Kelly	D/C	67	8	13	21	34
Charlie Burns	C	70	9	11	20	32
Pete Goegan	D	67	1	11	12	109
Warren Godfrey	D	69	6	4	10	44
Claude Laforge	LW	57	2	5	7	18
Billy McNeill	RW	54	2	5	7	32
Tom McCarthy	LW	15	2	3	5	4
Forbes Kennedy	C	67	1	4	5	149
Chuck Holmes	RW	15	0	3	3	6
Stu McNeill	C	3	1	1	2	2
Cummy Burton	RW	14	0	1	1	9
Gerry Ehman	RW	6	0	1	1	4
Lou Marcon	D	21	0	1	1	12
Gus Mortson	D	36	0	1	1	22
Gene Achtymichuk	C	12	0	0	0	0
Dunc Fisher	RW	8	0	0	0	0
Jack Hendrickson	D	3	0	0	0	2
Bob Perreault	G	3	0	0	0	0
Terry Sawchuk	G	67	0	0	0	12
Gord Strate	D	11	0	0	0	6

Goaltending

Player	MIN	GP	W	L	T	GA	GAA	SO
Terry Sawchuk	4020	67	23	36	8	207	3.09	5
Bob Perreault	180	3	2	1	0	9	3.00	1
Team:	4200	70	25	37	8	216	3.09	6

Note: GP = Games played; G = Goals; A = Assists; Pts = Points; +/- = Plus-minus PIM = Penalty minutes; PPG = Power-play goals; SHG = Short-handed goals; GWG = Game-winning goals;
MIN = Minutes played; W = Wins; L = Losses; T = Ties; GA = Goals against; GAA = Goals-against average; SO = Shutouts;

== See also ==
- 1958–59 NHL season
