= 1958–59 New York Rangers season =

NHL hockey team season

1958–59 New York Rangers
- League: 5th NHL
- 1958–59 record: 26–32–12
- Home record: 14–16–5
- Road record: 12–16–7
- Goals for: 201
- Goals against: 217

Team information
- General manager: Muzz Patrick
- Coach: Phil Watson
- Captain: Red Sullivan
- Alternate captains: Andy Bathgate; Bill Gadsby; Camille Henry
- Arena: Madison Square Garden

Team leaders
- Goals: Andy Bathgate (40)
- Assists: Andy Bathgate (48)
- Points: Andy Bathgate (88)
- Penalty minutes: Lou Fontinato (149)
- Wins: Gump Worsley (26)
- Goals against average: Gump Worsley (2.97)

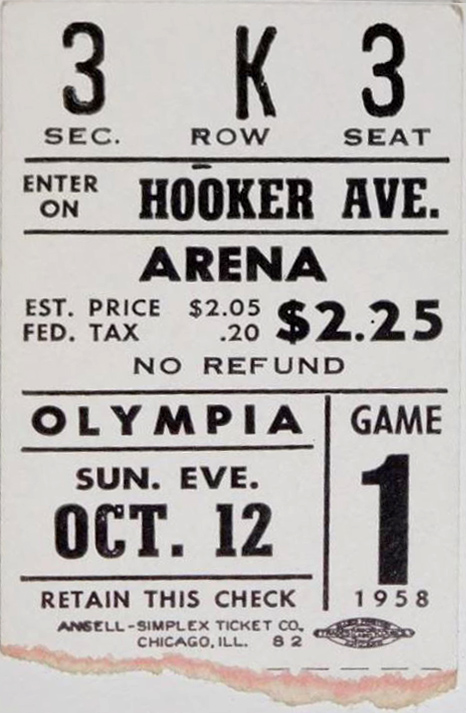
Ticket stub from a game played between the Detroit Red Wings and New York Rangers on October 12, 1958.

The 1958–59 New York Rangers season was the franchise's 33rd season. The Rangers finished with a 26–32–12 record in the regular season, and did not advance to the NHL playoffs for the first time since the 1954–55 season.

== Regular season ==
=== Final standings ===
National Hockey League
		GP	W	L	T	GF	GA	DIFF	Pts
1	Montreal Canadiens	70	39	18	13	258	158	+100	91
2	Boston Bruins	70	32	29	9	205	215	−10	73
3	Chicago Black Hawks	70	28	29	13	197	208	−11	69
4	Toronto Maple Leafs	70	27	32	11	189	201	−12	65
5	New York Rangers	70	26	32	12	201	217	−16	64
6	Detroit Red Wings	70	25	37	8	167	218	−51	58

=== Record vs. opponents ===
1958–59 NHL Records
Team	BOS	CHI	DET	MTL	NYR	TOR
Boston	—	6–7–1	8–5–1	6–6–2	6–5–3	6–6–2
Chicago	7–6–1	—	6–7–1	1–8–5	7–4–3	7–4–3
Detroit	5–8–1	7–6–1	—	1–9–4	6–7–1	6–7–1
Montreal	6–6–2	8–1–5	9–1–4	—	8–5–1	8–5–1
New York	5–6–3	4–7–3	7–6–1	5–8–1	—	5–5–4
Toronto	6–6–2	4–7–3	7–6–1	5–8–1	5–5–4	—

== Schedule and results ==
1958–59 regular season
October: 2–3–5 (home: 2–1–2; road: 0–2–3)

Game	October	Opponent	Score	Record
1	8	@ Chicago Black Hawks	1–1	0–0–1
2	11	@ Boston Bruins	4–4	0–0–2
3	12	@ Detroit Red Wings	3–0	0–1–2
4	15	Boston Bruins	4–4	0–1–3
5	18	@ Montreal Canadiens	2–2	0–1–4
6	19	Montreal Canadiens	5–3	0–2–4
7	25	Chicago Black Hawks	6–2	1–2–4
8	26	Toronto Maple Leafs	3–2	2–2–4
9	29	Boston Bruins	2–2	2–2–5
10	30	@ Detroit Red Wings	4–1	2–3–5

November: 6–6–2 (home: 4–3–0; road: 2–3–2)

Game	November	Opponent	Score	Record
11	1	@ Toronto Maple Leafs	4–3	2–4–5
12	2	Detroit Red Wings	2–1	2–5–5
13	4	@ Chicago Black Hawks	4–2	2–6–5
14	8	@ Montreal Canadiens	6–5	3–6–5
15	9	@ Boston Bruins	5–1	4–6–5
16	15	Boston Bruins	4–2	5–6–5
17	16	Montreal Canadiens	2–1	6–6–5
18	19	Toronto Maple Leafs	7–4	7–6–5
19	22	@ Toronto Maple Leafs	2–2	7–6–6
20	23	Detroit Red Wings	3–1	7–7–6
21	26	Montreal Canadiens	5–3	8–7–6
22	27	@ Boston Bruins	3–1	8–8–6
23	29	Boston Bruins	3–1	8–9–6
24	30	@ Chicago Black Hawks	2–2	8–9–7

December: 5–4–2 (home: 4–2–1; road: 1–2–1)

Game	December	Opponent	Score	Record
25	3	Chicago Black Hawks	4–2	9–9–7
26	6	@ Montreal Canadiens	6–0	9–10–7
27	7	Toronto Maple Leafs	2–0	9–11–7
28	10	Detroit Red Wings	2–1	9–12–7
29	13	@ Toronto Maple Leafs	4–4	9–12–8
30	14	Chicago Black Hawks	3–3	9–12–9
31	18	@ Detroit Red Wings	2–0	10–12–9
32	21	Toronto Maple Leafs	5–1	11–12–9
33	25	@ Montreal Canadiens	4–1	11–13–9
34	28	Montreal Canadiens	5–3	12–13–9
35	31	Boston Bruins	4–3	13–13–9

January: 6–6–1 (home: 0–3–1; road: 6–3–0)

Game	January	Opponent	Score	Record
36	1	@ Boston Bruins	5–2	14–13–9
37	3	@ Montreal Canadiens	5–1	14–14–9
38	4	Toronto Maple Leafs	4–2	14–15–9
39	7	Chicago Black Hawks	4–0	14–16–9
40	10	Detroit Red Wings	3–3	14–16–10
41	11	@ Chicago Black Hawks	4–3	15–16–10
42	14	@ Toronto Maple Leafs	3–2	16–16–10
43	17	@ Chicago Black Hawks	7–1	16–17–10
44	18	@ Detroit Red Wings	4–2	17–17–10
45	24	@ Montreal Canadiens	3–1	17–18–10
46	25	@ Boston Bruins	8–3	18–18–10
47	28	Chicago Black Hawks	3–1	18–19–10
48	31	@ Toronto Maple Leafs	5–2	19–19–10

February: 4–7–1 (home: 3–3–0; road: 1–4–1)

Game	February	Opponent	Score	Record
49	1	Detroit Red Wings	5–4	20–19–10
50	5	@ Detroit Red Wings	5–0	21–19–10
51	7	Chicago Black Hawks	6–3	21–20–10
52	8	@ Boston Bruins	4–1	21–21–10
53	11	Boston Bruins	5–3	21–22–10
54	12	@ Detroit Red Wings	1–0	21–23–10
55	15	Montreal Canadiens	5–1	21–24–10
56	18	@ Chicago Black Hawks	4–2	21–25–10
57	21	@ Toronto Maple Leafs	1–1	21–25–11
58	22	Montreal Canadiens	5–1	22–25–11
59	25	Detroit Red Wings	6–3	23–25–11
60	28	@ Montreal Canadiens	6–1	23–26–11

March: 3–6–1 (home: 1–4–1; road: 2–2–0)

Game	March	Opponent	Score	Record
61	1	Toronto Maple Leafs	1–1	23–26–12
62	7	@ Chicago Black Hawks	6–1	24–26–12
63	8	Detroit Red Wings	4–2	25–26–12
64	11	Chicago Black Hawks	5–3	25–27–12
65	12	@ Boston Bruins	5–4	25–28–12
66	14	@ Toronto Maple Leafs	5–0	25–29–12
67	15	Toronto Maple Leafs	6–5	25–30–12
68	18	Boston Bruins	5–3	25–31–12
69	21	@ Detroit Red Wings	5–2	26–31–12
70	22	Montreal Canadiens	4–2	26–32–12

Legend: Win (2 points) Loss (0 points) Tie (1 point)

== Player statistics ==
Skaters

Regular season
Player	GP	G	A	Pts	PIM
Andy Bathgate	70	40	48	88	48
George Sullivan	70	21	42	63	56
Andy Hebenton	70	33	29	62	8
Camille Henry	70	23	35	58	2
Bill Gadsby	70	5	46	51	56
Dean Prentice	70	17	33	50	11
Larry Popein	61	13	21	34	28
Eddie Shack	67	7	14	21	109
Jim Bartlett	70	11	9	20	118
Hank Ciesla	69	6	14	20	21
Harry Howell	70	4	10	14	101
Lou Fontinato	64	7	6	13	149
Les Colwill	69	7	6	13	16
John Hanna	70	1	10	11	83
Wally Hergesheimer	22	3	0	3	6
Jack Bownass	35	1	2	3	20
Earl Ingarfield	35	1	2	3	10
Larry Cahan	16	1	0	1	8

Goaltenders

Regular season
Player	GP	TOI	W	L	T	GA	GAA	SA	SV%	SO
Lorne Worsley	67	4001	26	30	11	199	2.97	2141	.907	2
Bruce Gamble	2	120	0	2	0	6	3.00	66	.909	0
Marcel Paille	1	60	0	0	1	4	4.00	32	.875	0
Julian Klymkiw	1	19	0	0	0	2	6.32	9	.778	0

^{†}Denotes player spent time with another team before joining Rangers. Stats reflect time with Rangers only.
^{‡}Traded mid-season. Stats reflect time with Rangers only.

Note:

Pos = Position;GP = Games played; G = Goals; A = Assists; Pts = Points; PIM = Penalty minutes; +/- = Plus/minus; PPG = Power-play goals; SHG = Short-handed goals; GWG = Game-winning goals
Pos = Position;GP = Games played; Min, TOI = Minutes played; W = Wins; L = Losses; T,T/OT = Ties; OTL = Overtime losses; GA = Goals-against; GAA = Goals-against average; SO = Shutouts; SA = Shots against; SV = Shots saved;SV% = Save percentage;

== See also ==
- 1958–59 NHL season
