= Claude Cyr =

Canadian ice hockey player

- Born: March 27, 1939 Montreal, Quebec, Canada
- Died: June 1, 1971 (aged 32) Montreal, Quebec, Canada
- Height: 5 ft 10 in (178 cm)
- Weight: 180 lb (82 kg; 12 st 12 lb)
- Position: Goaltender
- Caught: Left
- Played for: Montreal Canadiens
- National team: Canada
- Playing career: 1959–1968

Claude Jean Joseph Cyr (March 27, 1939 – June 1, 1971) was a Canadian ice hockey goaltender. He played one game in the National Hockey League with the Montreal Canadiens during the 1958–59 season. He replaced Claude Pronovost for one period against the Toronto Maple Leafs on March 19, 1959. The rest of his career, which lasted from 1957 to 1968, was spent in the minor leagues. Internationally Cyr played at the 1961 World Championships with the Canadian national team.

== Career statistics ==
=== Regular season and playoffs ===
			Regular season									Playoffs
Season	Team	League	GP	W	L	T	MIN	GA	SO	GAA	SV%	GP	W	L	MIN	GA	SO	GAA	SV%
1956–57	L'Abord-a-Plouffe Castors	MMJHL	36	15	18	3	2160	113	3	3.14	—	—	—	—	—	—	—	—	—
1957–58	Hull-Ottawa Canadiens	Exhib	13	—	—	—	780	57	0	4.38	—	—	—	—	—	—	—	—	—
1957–58	Hull-Ottawa Canadiens	EOHL	11	—	—	—	660	59	0	5.36	—	1	—	—	60	4	0	4.00	—
1958–59	Montreal Canadiens	NHL	1	0	0	0	20	1	0	3.00	.857	—	—	—	—	—	—	—	—
1958–59	Hull-Ottawa Canadiens	EOHL	26	—	—	—	1560	114	0	4.38	—	—	—	—	—	—	—	—	—
1958–59	Hull-Ottawa Canadiens	M-Cup	—	—	—	—	—	—	—	—	—	9	4	4	550	21	1	2.29	—
1959–60	Hull-Ottawa Canadiens	EPHL	6	2	4	0	360	22	0	3.67	—	—	—	—	—	—	—	—	—
1959–60	Montreal Royals	EPHL	7	2	4	1	420	27	0	3.86	—	—	—	—	—	—	—	—	—
1959–60	Cleveland Barons	AHL	2	0	2	0	120	7	0	3.50	—	—	—	—	—	—	—	—	—
1959–60	Calgary Stampeders	WHL	4	1	3	0	240	15	0	3.75	—	—	—	—	—	—	—	—	—
1960–61	Montreal Royals	EPHL	13	3	6	4	780	41	0	3.15	—	—	—	—	—	—	—	—	—
1960–61	Trail Smoke Eaters	WIHL	7	6	1	0	420	19	0	2.71	—	2	1	0	74	4	0	3.24	—
1961–62	Knoxville Knights	EHL	61	—	—	—	3660	211	3	3.46	—	8	4	4	480	17	1	2.12	—
1962–63	Knoxville Knights/Philadelphia Ramblers	EHL	36	—	—	—	2160	118	5	3.28	—	—	—	—	—	—	—	—	—
1963–64	Verdun Pirates	QSHL	—	—	—	—	—	—	—	—	—	—	—	—	—	—	—	—	—
1964–65	Sherbrooke Beavers	ETSHL	—	—	—	—	—	—	—	—	—	—	—	—	—	—	—	—	—
1965–66	Victoriaville Tigres	QSHL	16	—	—	—	960	82	1	5.13	—	—	—	—	—	—	—	—	—
1966–67	Drummondville Eagles	QSHL	27	—	—	—	1620	102	2	3.76	—	9	8	1	540	19	1	2.11	—
1966–67	Drummondville Eagles	Al-Cup	—	—	—	—	—	—	—	—	—	11	10	1	677	23	2	2.04	—
1967–68	Drummondville Eagles	QSHL	23	13	9	1	1380	93	0	4.04	—	9	5	4	540	40	0	4.60	—
NHL totals			1	0	0	0	20	1	0	3.00	.857	—	—	—	—	—	—	—	—

=== International ===
Year	Team	Event	GP	W	L	T	MIN	GA	SO	GAA	SV%
1961	Canada	WC	2	1	0	0	74	0	0	0.00	1.000
Senior totals			2	1	0	0	74	0	0	0.00	1.000

== See also ==
- List of players who played only one game in the NHL
