= Ian Cushenan =

Canadian ice hockey player (1933–2020)

- Born: November 29, 1933; Hamilton, Ontario, Canada
- Died: February 5, 2020 (aged 86); North Olmsted, Ohio, United States
- Height: 6 ft 2 in (188 cm)
- Weight: 187 lb (85 kg; 13 st 5 lb)
- Position: Defence
- Shot: Left
- Played for: Chicago Black Hawks; Montreal Canadiens; New York Rangers; Detroit Red Wings
- Playing career: 1954–1966

Ian Robertson Cushenan (November 29, 1933 – February 5, 2020) was a Canadian ice hockey defenceman who played 129 games in the National Hockey League between 1957 and 1962. The rest of his career, which lasted from 1954 to 1966, was mainly spent in the American Hockey League.

== Playing career ==
Cushenan began his NHL career with the Chicago Black Hawks organization in 1956. He would later play with the Montreal Canadiens, New York Rangers, and Detroit Red Wings organizations. In 1958 he played on the 1958 NHL All Star team He won the Stanley Cup in 1959 with the Montreal Canadiens. Cushenan last played on the NHL level during the 1963–64 NHL season. He retired from hockey altogether in 1966 after two seasons with the AHL's Buffalo Bisons. He played in the minor leagues for the St. Catharines Teepees, Cleveland Barons, Quebec Aces, Springfield Indians, Pittsburgh Hornets, and Buffalo Bisons.

== Post-playing career ==
Cushenan was a youth and high school hockey coach throughout the 1970s and 1980s in North Olmsted, Ohio. He lived in the Cleveland, Ohio area until dying on February 5, 2020, at the age of 86.

== Career statistics ==
=== Regular season and playoffs ===
			Regular season					Playoffs
Season	Team	League	GP	G	A	Pts	PIM	GP	G	A	Pts	PIM
1952–53	St. Catharines Teepees	OHA	49	3	9	12	60	3	0	1	1	8
1953–54	St. Catharines Teepees	OHA	59	5	25	30	86	15	0	3	3	23
1953–54	St. Catharines Teepees	M-Cup	—	—	—	—	—	11	0	1	1	34
1954–55	Quebec Aces	QSHL	6	0	2	2	4	—	—	—	—	—
1954–55	Cleveland Barons	AHL	56	1	13	14	84	4	0	0	0	12
1955–56	Cleveland Barons	AHL	63	2	16	18	113	8	0	3	3	38
1956–57	Chicago Black Hawks	NHL	11	0	0	0	13	—	—	—	—	—
1956–57	Cleveland Barons	AHL	54	0	17	17	151	—	—	—	—	—
1957–58	Chicago Black Hawks	NHL	61	2	8	10	67	—	—	—	—	—
1958–59	Montreal Canadiens	NHL	35	1	2	3	26	—	—	—	—	—
1959–60	New York Rangers	NHL	17	0	1	1	22	—	—	—	—	—
1959–60	Springfield Indians	AHL	49	0	12	12	67	10	0	1	1	8
1960–61	Springfield Indians	AHL	71	5	41	46	81	8	2	3	5	18
1961–62	Buffalo Bisons	AHL	69	2	21	23	84	11	0	3	3	8
1962–63	Buffalo Bisons	AHL	72	3	29	32	97	13	1	6	7	34
1963–64	Detroit Red Wings	NHL	5	0	0	0	4	—	—	—	—	—
1963–64	Pittsburgh Hornets	AHL	56	4	16	20	77	5	0	3	3	9
1964–65	Buffalo Bisons	AHL	69	4	23	27	89	9	3	0	3	12
1965–66	Buffalo Bisons	AHL	69	0	13	13	66	—	—	—	—	—
AHL totals			628	21	201	222	909	68	6	19	25	139
NHL totals			129	3	11	14	132	—	—	—	—	—
