= 1958–59 NHL season =

National Hockey League season

- League: National Hockey League
- Sport: Ice hockey
- Duration: October 8, 1958 – April 18, 1959
- Games: 70
- Teams: 6
- TV partner(s): CBC, SRC (Canada); CBS (United States)

Regular season
- Season champion: Montreal Canadiens
- Season MVP: Andy Bathgate (Rangers)
- Top scorer: Dickie Moore (Canadiens)

Stanley Cup
- Champions: Montreal Canadiens
- Runners-up: Toronto Maple Leafs

NHL seasons
- ← 1957–58 1959–60 →

The 1958–59 NHL season was the 42nd season of the National Hockey League. Six teams played 70 games each. The Montreal Canadiens were the Stanley Cup champions as they beat the Toronto Maple Leafs four games to one in the best-of-seven final series. This marked the fourth consecutive Stanley Cup win for the Canadiens as they became the first team to win four in a row.

== League business ==
The NHL and the Canadian Amateur Hockey Association (CAHA) negotiated a new professional-amateur agreement, since the previous deal had expired in 1955, and the groups had operated on a gentleman's agreement. CAHA secretary George Dudley announced that NHL would pay C$40,000 towards developing amateur players, and the agreement set rules for negotiation lists and reserve lists and an earlier deadline to decide which players might be moved from a junior team to a professional team. The CAHA agreed that amateurs aged 17 and older would use same rules as the professionals except for overtime.

== Regular season ==
The Toronto Maple Leafs, last-place finishers the previous season, brought up Johnny Bower to share goaltending duties with Ed Chadwick and bolstered the defence by adding Carl Brewer and Allan Stanley to aid Tim Horton and Bobby Baun.

Ralph Backstrom and Jean Beliveau each had two goals apiece in a 9–1 Montreal win at the Montreal Forum on October 23. Rudy Pilous, coach of the Black Hawks, was displeased with his team's performance and fined his team $100 for the poor performance.

Beliveau had a hat trick November 29 as Montreal beat Detroit 6–2 at the Forum. Gordie Howe was injured in a collision with Doug Harvey near the end of the first period and was taken to hospital, returning for the third period. The next night, Montreal defeated the Red Wings 7–0 as Jacques Plante got his third shutout of the season.

On January 3, Harvey was back in the Canadiens' lineup and scored two goals in a 5–1 win over the New York Rangers at the Forum. In the last minute of play, Plante got two penalties, one of them a major that sparked the fight. Jimmy Bartlett had skated into Plante, and Plante retaliated by punching Bartlett, provoking a bench-clearing brawl. Referee Dalton McArthur gave Bartlett a double major, one for charging and one for fighting, and a misconduct penalty.

On February 1, the Rangers downed the Red Wings 5–4 at Madison Square Garden. Lou Fontinato became incensed when Gordie Howe struck Eddie Shack with his stick, and challenged the right wing. Howe broke Fontinato's nose in the fight. On February 5, the Rangers beat the Wings 5–0 on Worsley's shutout. Detroit coach Sid Abel, formerly Howe's centerman, fined 14 players $100 each for playing what he described as "the worst game of hockey he had seen in 20 years".

On February 15 at Madison Square Garden, Worsley had Montreal shut out with ten minutes remaining. Then the Canadiens scored 5 goals to win 5–1. Coach Phil Watson ordered every player except Worsley out on the ice for an after-game workout. Watson said Worsley hadn't played so badly. General manager Muzz Patrick said the workout was in lieu of fines.

With five games left in the season, the Rangers had a seven-point lead over Toronto. Then the Rangers went into a tailspin, and the Leafs got hot. The key game was played March 19 between Toronto and the Canadiens. Plante could not play due to a severe case of boils, and so the Canadiens used Claude Pronovost in goal. He let in five goals before coach Toe Blake replaced him in the third period with Claude Cyr; it was Cyr's first and last NHL game. Toronto won 6–3. The Canadiens brought up Charlie Hodge from the Montreal Royals and on March 22, he beat the Rangers 4–2. The Rangers still had a chance to make the playoffs if Detroit beat Toronto. The Leafs won 6–4 and ousted the Rangers from the playoffs.

The Montreal Canadiens again won the regular season standings; their players dominated the All-Star nominations (with six of a possible twelve, the same number as in 1956) and trophies as Jacques Plante won his fourth straight Vezina Trophy, Tom Johnson won the James Norris Memorial Trophy, ending teammate Doug Harvey's four-year monopoly, and Dickie Moore won the Art Ross Trophy, setting a new record for total points in a season: with a 41-goal, 55-assist campaign, Moore broke Howe's league record by a single point.

This season marked the final time until 1967 with an active player who had played for a team not in the Original Six. Former Brooklyn Americans player Ken Mosdell suited up for two postseason games for the Canadiens that year, and retired after Montreal won the Cup.

=== Final standings ===
National Hockey League
		GP	W	L	T	GF	GA	DIFF	Pts
1	Montreal Canadiens	70	39	18	13	258	158	+100	91
2	Boston Bruins	70	32	29	9	205	215	−10	73
3	Chicago Black Hawks	70	28	29	13	197	208	−11	69
4	Toronto Maple Leafs	70	27	32	11	189	201	−12	65
5	New York Rangers	70	26	32	12	201	217	−16	64
6	Detroit Red Wings	70	25	37	8	167	218	−51	58

== Playoffs ==
=== Playoff bracket ===
The top four teams in the league qualified for the playoffs. In the semifinals, the first-place team played the third-place team, while the second-place team faced the fourth-place team, with the winners advancing to the Stanley Cup Finals. In both rounds, teams competed in a best-of-seven series (scores in the bracket indicate the number of games won in each best-of-seven series).

Semifinals
1	Montreal	4
3	Chicago	2
2	Boston	3
4	Toronto	4

Stanley Cup Finals
1	Montreal	4
4	Toronto	1

=== Semifinals ===
==== (1) Montreal Canadiens vs. (3) Chicago Black Hawks ====
Following game six, Ottawa Journal sports editor Bill Westwick quoted league president Clarence Campbell as accusing the referee Red Storey of "freezing" in the final minutes of the near-riotous game. Storey subsequently resigned as a referee. Campbell stated that Westwick took the words out of context, accused him of "breaking confidence" in the article. Westwick's fellow newsmen defended his article and did not question its veracity.

March 24	Chicago Black Hawks	2–4	Montreal Canadiens	Montreal Forum	Recap
Tod Sloan (1) – pp – 16:34		First period	10:46 – Claude Provost (1)
No scoring		Second period	04:05 – Henri Richard (1); 19:23 – pp – Marcel Bonin (1)
Tod Sloan (2) – 03:26		Third period	02:04 – Marcel Bonin (2)
Glenn Hall 41 saves / 45 shots		Goalie stats	Jacques Plante 13 saves / 15 shots

March 26	Chicago Black Hawks	1–5	Montreal Canadiens	Montreal Forum	Recap
Eric Nesterenko (1) – sh – 14:35		First period	05:56 – Marcel Bonin (3); 12:01 – pp – Bernie Geoffrion (1); 12:48 – Dickie Moore (1)
No scoring		Second period	08:29 – pp – Jean Beliveau (1); 17:06 – pp – Marcel Bonin (4)
No scoring		Third period	No scoring
Glenn Hall 31 saves / 36 shots		Goalie stats	Jacques Plante 19 saves / 20 shots

March 28	Montreal Canadiens	2–4	Chicago Black Hawks	Chicago Stadium	Recap
No scoring		First period	11:17 – Al Arbour (1); 13:15 – Lorne Ferguson (1)
Marcel Bonin (5) – 06:30		Second period	16:44 – Ed Litzenberger (1)
Henri Richard (2) – 08:48		Third period	19:54 – en – Glen Skov (1)
Jacques Plante 27 saves / 30 shots		Goalie stats	Glenn Hall 38 saves / 40 shots

March 31	Montreal Canadiens	1–3	Chicago Black Hawks	Chicago Stadium	Recap
Marcel Bonin (6) – pp – 04:33		First period	18:08 – Bobby Hull (1)
No scoring		Second period	No scoring
No scoring		Third period	13:26 – Lorne Ferguson (2); 19:49 – en – Glen Skov (2)
Jacques Plante 21 saves / 23 shots		Goalie stats	Glenn Hall 31 saves / 32 shots

April 2	Chicago Black Hawks	2–4	Montreal Canadiens	Montreal Forum	Recap
No scoring		First period	01:34 – Andre Pronovost (1); 10:48 – pp – Marcel Bonin (7); 14:35 – Claude Provost (2); 16:38 – pp – Bernie Geoffrion (2)
Tod Sloan (3) – pp – 03:00		Second period	No scoring
Eric Nesterenko (2) – 05:11		Third period	No scoring
Glenn Hall 33 saves / 37 shots		Goalie stats	Jacques Plante 26 saves / 28 shots

April 4	Montreal Canadiens	5–4	Chicago Black Hawks	Chicago Stadium	Recap
Doug Harvey (1) – 02:20		First period	13:05 – pp – Ted Lindsay (2)
Dickie Moore (2) – pp – 09:09; Claude Provost (3) – sh – 10:22		Second period	05:52 – Ed Litzenberger (2)
Dickie Moore (3) – 13:18; Claude Provost (4) – 18:32		Third period	03:24 – pp – Ed Litzenberger (3); 14:32 – Ted Lindsay (2)
Jacques Plante 29 saves / 33 shots		Goalie stats	Glenn Hall 32 saves / 37 shots

Montreal won series 4–2

==== (2) Boston Bruins vs. (4) Toronto Maple Leafs ====
March 24	Toronto Maple Leafs	1–5	Boston Bruins	Boston Garden	Recap
No scoring		First period	07:50 – Jerry Toppazzini (1)
Gerry Ehman (1) – 06:07		Second period	10:53 – Leo Labine (1); 11:53 – Vic Stasiuk (1); 18:45 – sh – Larry Leach (1)
No scoring		Third period	06:18 – Don McKenney (1)
Johnny Bower 24 saves / 29 shots		Goalie stats	Harry Lumley 32 saves / 33 shots

March 26	Toronto Maple Leafs	2–4	Boston Bruins	Boston Garden	Recap
Dick Duff (1) – 15:45		First period	10:00 – Fleming MacKell (1); 12:14 – pp – Fleming MacKell (2)
Ron Stewart (1) – 08:09		Second period	No scoring
No scoring		Third period	15:59 – Jean-Guy Gendron (1); 19:15 – en – Leo Labine (2)
Johnny Bower 24 saves / 27 shots		Goalie stats	Harry Lumley 34 saves / 36 shots

March 28	Boston Bruins	2–3	OT	Toronto Maple Leafs	Maple Leaf Gardens	Recap
Vic Stasiuk (2) – pp – 02:43		First period		16:21 – Bob Pulford (1)
Vic Stasiuk (3) – 17:34		Second period		No scoring
No scoring		Third period		17:08 – Gerry Ehman (2)
No scoring		First overtime period		05:02 – Gerry Ehman (3)
Harry Lumley 27 saves / 30 shots		Goalie stats		Johnny Bower 33 saves / 35 shots

March 31	Boston Bruins	2–3	OT	Toronto Maple Leafs	Maple Leaf Gardens	Recap
No scoring		First period		06:58 – pp – Gerry Ehman (4)
No scoring		Second period		No scoring
Jerry Toppazzini (2) – 02:02; Bronco Horvath (1) – 07:20		Third period		02:46 – Brian Cullen (1)
No scoring		First overtime period		11:21 – pp – Frank Mahovlich (1)
Harry Lumley 35 saves / 38 shots		Goalie stats		Johnny Bower 34 saves / 36 shots

April 2	Toronto Maple Leafs	4–1	Boston Bruins	Boston Garden	Recap
Bert Olmstead (1) – pp – 09:26		First period	No scoring
Dick Duff (2) – 06:37		Second period	No scoring
Frank Mahovlich (2) – 00:19; Bob Pulford (2) – sh – 09:02		Third period	11:25 – Jerry Toppazzini (3)
Johnny Bower 32 saves / 33 shots		Goalie stats	Harry Lumley 22 saves / 26 shots

April 4	Boston Bruins	5–4	Toronto Maple Leafs	Maple Leaf Gardens	Recap
Jerry Toppazzini (4) – pp – 07:28; Don McKenney (2) – 09:34		First period	15:13 – pp – Bert Olmstead (2)
Johnny Bucyk (1) – 09:57; Johnny Bucyk (2) – 17:19		Second period	03:50 – Frank Mahovlich (3)
Bronco Horvath (2) – 12:56		Third period	02:55 – Gerry Ehman (5); 07:37 – sh – Frank Mahovlich (4)
Harry Lumley 27 saves / 31 shots		Goalie stats	Johnny Bower 31 saves / 36 shots

April 7	Toronto Maple Leafs	3–2	Boston Bruins	Boston Garden	Recap
Larry Regan (1) – pp – 05:33		First period	01:11 – pp – Vic Stasiuk (4)
No scoring		Second period	14:33 – Leo Boivin (1)
Bob Pulford (3) – 08:36; Gerry Ehman (6) – 17:27		Third period	No scoring
Johnny Bower 23 saves / 25 shots		Goalie stats	Harry Lumley 26 saves / 29 shots

Toronto won series 4–3

As of 2026, this is the last time the Maple Leafs defeated the Bruins in a playoff series.

=== Stanley Cup Finals ===
April 9	Toronto Maple Leafs	3–5	Montreal Canadiens	Montreal Forum	Recap
Dick Duff (3) – sh – 04:53; Billy Harris (1) – 06:24		First period	00:36 – Henri Richard (3); 15:41 – Ralph Backstrom (1)
Ron Stewart (2) – 18:26		Second period	16:28 – Andre Pronovost (2)
No scoring		Third period	11:59 – Marcel Bonin (8); 15:02 – pp – Dickie Moore (4)
Johnny Bower 31 saves / 36 shots		Goalie stats	Jacques Plante 24 saves / 27 shots

April 11	Toronto Maple Leafs	1–3	Montreal Canadiens	Montreal Forum	Recap
No scoring		First period	05:12 – pp – Tom Johnson (1)
Ron Stewart (3) – 11:41		Second period	No scoring
No scoring		Third period	05:02 – Claude Provost (5); 18:33 – Claude Provost (6)
Johnny Bower 41 saves / 44 shots		Goalie stats	Jacques Plante 29 saves / 30 shots

April 14	Montreal Canadiens	2–3	OT	Toronto Maple Leafs	Maple Leaf Gardens	Recap
Marcel Bonin (9) – pp – 17:31		First period		16:29 – Billy Harris (2)
No scoring		Second period		17:11 – Bert Olmstead (3)
Dickie Moore (5) – 01:30		Third period		No scoring
No scoring		First overtime period		10:06 – Dick Duff (4)
Jacques Plante 32 saves / 35 shots		Goalie stats		Johnny Bower 29 saves / 31 shots

April 16	Montreal Canadiens	3–2	Toronto Maple Leafs	Maple Leaf Gardens	Recap
No scoring		First period	No scoring
No scoring		Second period	No scoring
Ab McDonald (1) – 09:54; Ralph Backstrom (2) – 13:01; Bernie Geoffrion (3) – 15:56		Third period	03:45 – Billy Harris (3); 18:36 – Frank Mahovlich (5)
Jacques Plante 28 saves / 30 shots		Goalie stats	Johnny Bower 29 saves / 32 shots

April 18	Toronto Maple Leafs	3–5	Montreal Canadiens	Montreal Forum	Recap
No scoring		First period	04:13 – pp – Ralph Backstrom (3); 13:42 – Bernie Geoffrion (4); 16:26 – Tom Johnson (2)
Bob Pulford (4) – pp – 04:27		Second period	09:55 – Marcel Bonin (10); 19:25 – pp – Bernie Geoffrion (5)
Frank Mahovlich (6) – 12:07; Bert Olmstead (4) – 16:19		Third period	No scoring
Johnny Bower 37 saves / 42 shots		Goalie stats	Jacques Plante 33 saves / 36 shots

Montreal won series 4–1

== Awards ==
1958–59 NHL awards
Prince of Wales Trophy: (Regular season champion)	Montreal Canadiens
Art Ross Trophy: (Top scorer)	Dickie Moore, Montreal Canadiens
Calder Memorial Trophy: (Best first-year player)	Ralph Backstrom, Montreal Canadiens
Hart Trophy: (Most valuable player)	Andy Bathgate, New York Rangers
James Norris Memorial Trophy: (Best defenceman)	Tom Johnson, Montreal Canadiens
Lady Byng Memorial Trophy: (Excellence and sportsmanship)	Alex Delvecchio, Detroit Red Wings
Vezina Trophy: (Goaltender of team with the best goals-against average)	Jacques Plante, Montreal Canadiens

=== All-Star teams ===
First team	Position	Second team
Jacques Plante, Montreal Canadiens	G	Terry Sawchuk, Detroit Red Wings
Tom Johnson, Montreal Canadiens	D	Marcel Pronovost, Detroit Red Wings
Bill Gadsby, New York Rangers	D	Doug Harvey, Montreal Canadiens
Jean Beliveau, Montreal Canadiens	C	Henri Richard, Montreal Canadiens
Andy Bathgate, New York Rangers	RW	Gordie Howe, Detroit Red Wings
Dickie Moore, Montreal Canadiens	LW	Alex Delvecchio, Detroit Red Wings

== Player statistics ==
=== Scoring leaders ===
Note: GP = Games played, G = Goals, A = Assists, Pts = Points, PIM = Penalties in minutes

Player	Team	GP	G	A	Pts	PIM
Dickie Moore	Montreal Canadiens	70	41	55	96	61
Jean Beliveau	Montreal Canadiens	64	45	46	91	67
Andy Bathgate	New York Rangers	70	40	48	88	48
Gordie Howe	Detroit Red Wings	70	32	46	78	57
Ed Litzenberger	Chicago Black Hawks	70	33	44	77	37
Bernie Geoffrion	Montreal Canadiens	59	22	44	66	30
Red Sullivan	New York Rangers	70	21	42	63	56
Andy Hebenton	New York Rangers	70	33	29	62	8
Don McKenney	Boston Bruins	70	32	30	62	20
Tod Sloan	Chicago Black Hawks	59	27	35	62	79

=== Leading goaltenders ===
Note: GP = Games played; Min = Minutes played; GA = Goals against; GAA = Goals against average; W = Wins; L = Losses; T = Ties; SO = Shutouts

Player	Team	GP	MIN	GA	GAA	W	L	T	SO
Jacques Plante	Montreal Canadiens	67	4000	144	2.15	38	16	13	9
Johnny Bower	Toronto Maple Leafs	39	2340	107	2.74	15	17	7	3
Glenn Hall	Chicago Black Hawks	70	4200	208	2.97	28	29	13	1
Gump Worsley	New York Rangers	67	4001	199	2.97	26	30	11	2
Ed Chadwick	Toronto Maple Leafs	31	1860	92	2.97	12	15	4	3
Terry Sawchuk	Detroit Red Wings	67	4020	202	3.01	23	36	8	5
Don Simmons	Boston Bruins	58	3480	183	3.16	24	26	8	3

== Coaches ==
- Boston Bruins: Milt Schmidt
- Chicago Black Hawks: Rudy Pilous
- Detroit Red Wings: Sid Abel
- Montreal Canadiens: Toe Blake
- New York Rangers: Phil Watson
- Toronto Maple Leafs: Punch Imlach

== Debuts ==
The following is a list of players of note who played their first NHL game in 1958–59 (listed with their first team, asterisk(*) marks debut in playoffs):

- Stan Mikita, Chicago Black Hawks
- John McKenzie, Chicago Black Hawks
- Bill Hicke*, Montreal Canadiens
- Eddie Shack, New York Rangers

== Last games ==
The following is a list of players of note that played their last game in the NHL in 1958–59 (listed with their last team):

- Earl Reibel, Boston Bruins
- Real Chevrefils, Boston Bruins
- Danny Lewicki, Chicago Black Hawks
- Gus Mortson, Detroit Red Wings
- Kenny Mosdell, Montreal Canadiens (Last active from the New York Americans/ Brooklyn Americans and last player from the pre-Original Six era.)
- Wally Hergesheimer, New York Rangers

== Broadcasting ==
Hockey Night in Canada on CBC Television televised Saturday night regular season games and selected Stanley Cup playoff games. Games were not broadcast in their entirety until the 1968–69 season, and were typically joined in progress, while the radio version of HNIC aired games in their entirety.

In the U.S., this was the third season of a four-year deal with CBS to televise Saturday afternoon regular season games. This season, CBS aired games from October to March.

== See also ==
- 1958–59 NHL transactions
- List of Stanley Cup champions
- National Hockey League All-Star Game
- 1958 in sports
- 1959 in sports
