= Claude Provost =

Canadian ice hockey player (1933-1984)

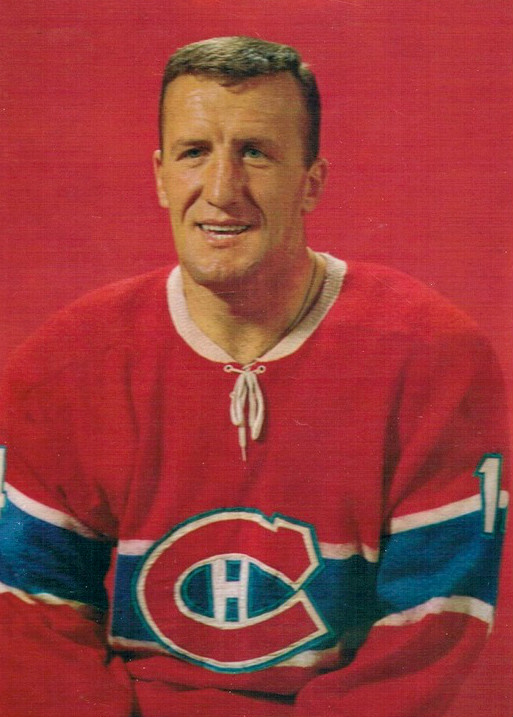
- Provost with the Montreal Canadiens, c. 1963
- Born: September 17, 1933 Montreal, Quebec, Canada
- Died: April 17, 1984 (aged 50) Hallandale, Florida, U.S.
- Height: 5 ft 9 in (175 cm)
- Weight: 175 lb (79 kg; 12 st 7 lb)
- Position: Right wing
- Shot: Right
- Played for: Montreal Canadiens
- Playing career: 1955–1970

Claude Joseph Antoine Provost (September 17, 1933 – April 17, 1984) was a Canadian professional ice hockey player.

A right winger, Provost played all 15 seasons of his National Hockey League (NHL) career with the Montreal Canadiens. He won the Stanley Cup nine times and was the first recipient of the Bill Masterton Trophy, awarded for perseverance, in 1967-68.

Provost won nine Stanley Cups with the Canadiens and appeared in eleven NHL All-Star Games, the most by a player not in the Hockey Hall of Fame. Provost also holds the NHL record for the earliest goal in a period with four seconds. In the sixth game of the 1965 Stanley Cup semifinals, Provost scored the game-winning goal against Toronto in overtime. In the "Original Six" era, he was one of 24 players to record five 50-point seasons.

== Achievements ==
- Stanley Cup champion — 1956, 1957, 1958, 1959, 1960, 1965, 1966, 1968, 1969
- Bill Masterton Trophy: 1968
- NHL First All-Star Team: 1965
- NHL All-Star Game: 1956 (Note: At the time, the All-Star Game pitted the Stanley Cup champion against a select group of All-Stars just before the start of a season, and Provost played in the game as part of the defending Stanley Cup champion team), 1957, 1958, 1959, 1960, 1961, 1962, 1963, 1964, 1965, 1967

== Personal life and death ==
Provost had three children. His son, Claude Provost Jr., is the owner and founder of a spa near the municipality of Bolton-Est, Quebec.

Provost died of a heart attack during a vacation to Hallandale, Florida, on April 17, 1984. He was 50 years old.

== Career statistics ==
			Regular season					Playoffs
Season	Team	League	GP	G	A	Pts	PIM	GP	G	A	Pts	PIM
1951–52	Montreal Nationale	QJHL	49	24	29	53	46	9	5	2	7	4
1952–53	Montreal Junior Canadiens	QJHL	46	24	36	60	29	7	6	5	11	10
1953–54	Montreal Junior Canadiens	QJHL	48	45	39	84	83	8	3	8	11	16
1954–55	Shawinigan-Falls Cataracts	QHL	61	25	23	48	44	13	6	3	9	6
1954–55	Shawinigan-Falls Cataracts	Ed-Cup	—	—	—	—	—	7	2	2	4	4
1955–56	Shawinigan-Falls Cataracts	QHL	9	7	8	15	12	—	—	—	—	—
1955–56	Montreal Canadiens	NHL	60	13	16	29	30	10	3	3	6	12
1956–57	Montreal Canadiens	NHL	67	16	14	30	24	10	0	1	1	8
1957–58	Montreal Canadiens	NHL	70	19	32	51	71	10	1	3	4	8
1958–59	Montreal Canadiens	NHL	69	16	22	38	37	11	6	2	8	2
1959–60	Montreal Canadiens	NHL	70	17	29	46	42	8	1	1	2	0
1960–61	Montreal Canadiens	NHL	49	11	4	15	32	6	1	3	4	4
1961–62	Montreal Canadiens	NHL	70	33	29	62	22	6	2	2	4	2
1962–63	Montreal Canadiens	NHL	67	20	30	50	26	5	0	1	1	2
1963–64	Montreal Canadiens	NHL	68	15	17	32	37	7	2	2	4	22
1964–65	Montreal Canadiens	NHL	70	27	37	64	28	13	2	6	8	12
1965–66	Montreal Canadiens	NHL	70	19	36	55	38	10	2	3	5	2
1966–67	Montreal Canadiens	NHL	64	11	13	24	16	7	1	1	2	0
1967–68	Montreal Canadiens	NHL	73	14	30	44	26	13	2	8	10	10
1968–69	Montreal Canadiens	NHL	73	13	15	28	18	10	2	2	4	2
1969–70	Montreal Canadiens	NHL	65	10	11	21	22	—	—	—	—	—
NHL totals			1,005	254	335	589	469	126	25	38	63	86

== See also ==
- List of NHL players with 1,000 games played

== Notes ==
Preceded by first winner	Bill Masterton Trophy winner 1968	Succeeded by Ted Hampson
