= Ron Stewart =

Canadian ice hockey player and coach (1932–2012)

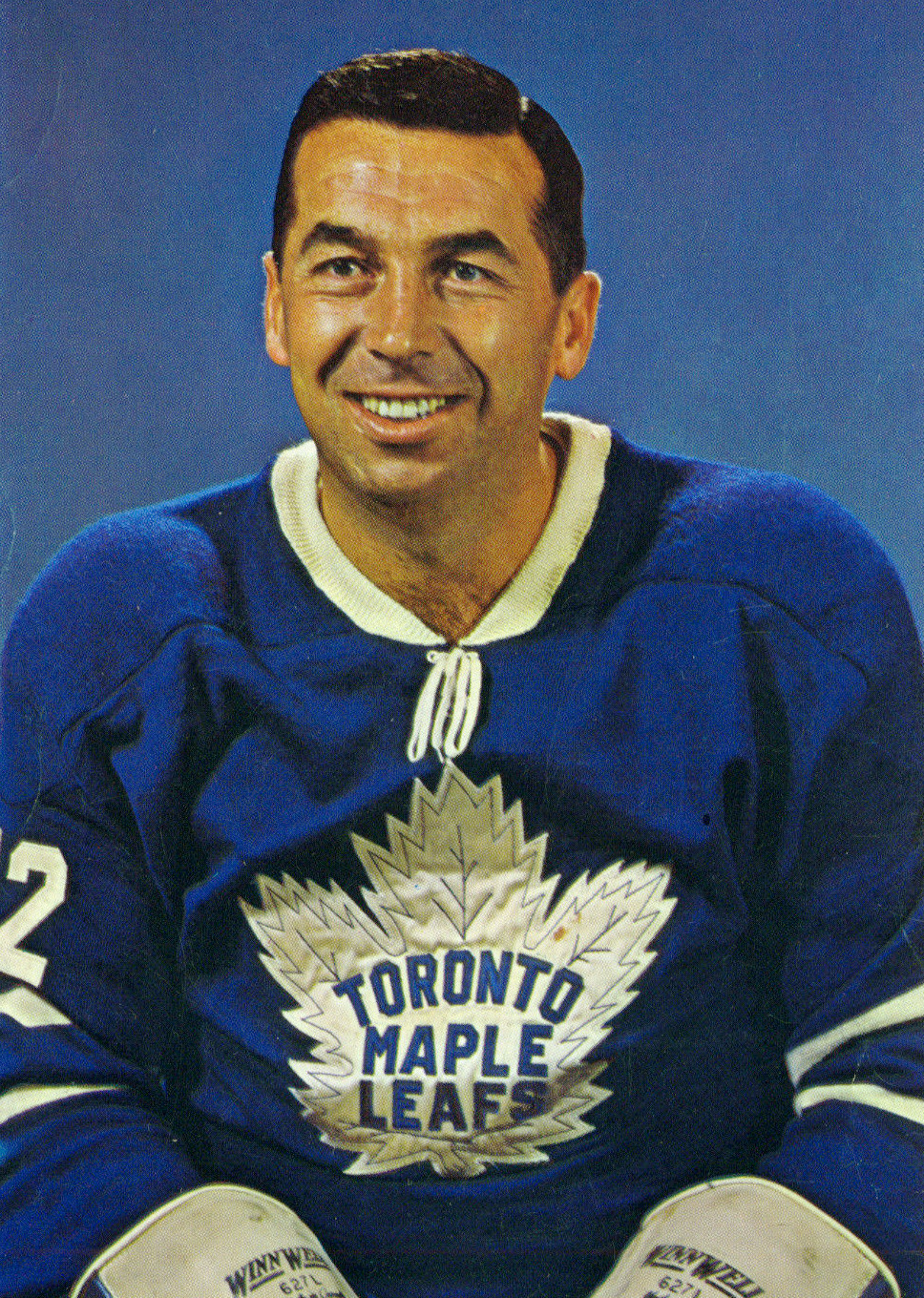
- Stewart with the Toronto Maple Leafs in the 1960s
- Born: July 11, 1932 Calgary, Alberta
- Died: March 17, 2012 (aged 79) Kelowna, British Columbia
- Height: 6 ft 1 in (185 cm)
- Weight: 197 lb (89 kg; 14 st 1 lb)
- Position: Right wing
- Shot: Right
- Played for: Toronto Maple Leafs; Boston Bruins; St. Louis Blues; New York Rangers; Vancouver Canucks; New York Islanders
- Playing career: 1952–1973

Ronald George Stewart (July 11, 1932 – March 17, 2012) was a Canadian professional ice hockey player in the National Hockey League (NHL) from 1952 to 1973, as well as a coach. He spent the first half of his career with the Toronto Maple Leafs, and won the Stanley Cup three times from 1962 to 1964. The latter part of his playing career was spent with the Boston Bruins, St. Louis Blues, New York Rangers, Vancouver Canucks, and New York Islanders. He would later coach the Rangers for half of a season, and spent a full season as coach of the Los Angeles Kings.

== Early career ==
After growing up in Alberta, Stewart moved to Ontario as a teen to participate in the Ontario Hockey Association, then the top ranked junior league. He won the Memorial Cup in 1952 with the Guelph Biltmores.

== NHL player ==
Stewart played thirteen seasons for the Toronto Maple Leafs, and was part of three Leafs’ Stanley Cup-winning teams in the early 1960s. After his time in Toronto, he spent two seasons with the Boston Bruins (1965–1966, 1966–1967). He was chosen by the St. Louis Blues in the 1967 NHL Expansion Draft, before being traded to the New York Rangers in that same season. He spent part of the 1971–1972 season with the Vancouver Canucks, but returned briefly to the Rangers. He spent his final year, 1972-1973, with the New York Islanders.

== Death of Terry Sawchuk ==
After the 1969–1970 season ended, Stewart and Rangers teammate Terry Sawchuk, both of whom had been drinking, argued over expenses for the house they rented together on Long Island, New York. Sawchuk suffered severe internal injuries during the scuffle. Sawchuk told the police that he accepted full responsibility for the events. Sawchuk never recovered and died shortly thereafter from a pulmonary embolism on May 31, 1970 at the age of 40. A Nassau County grand jury exonerated Stewart and ruled that Sawchuk's death was accidental.

== Coaching ==
After retiring from play, Stewart became a coach. He was the head coach of the Rangers for the start of the 1975–76 season, but after a record of 15 wins, 20 losses and 4 ties in 39 games, was fired. His next NHL job was with the Los Angeles Kings for the 1977–78 season. He had a record of 31 wins, 34 losses and 15 ties over the season, and was not brought back for the next season.

== Retirement ==
Stewart spent his latter years in British Columbia and Arizona. He had three children by his first wife, Barbara. He died of cancer in 2012.

== Career statistics ==
			Regular season					Playoffs
Season	Team	League	GP	G	A	Pts	PIM	GP	G	A	Pts	PIM
1949–50	Toronto Marlboros	OHA-Jr.	30	2	5	7	41	5	0	1	1	8
1950–51	Toronto Marlboros	OHA-Jr.	53	22	23	45	49	13	6	8	14	31
1951–52	Toronto Marlboros	OHA-Jr.	21	9	10	19	57	—	—	—	—	—
1951–52	Barrie Flyers	OHA-Jr.	29	13	18	31	43	—	—	—	—	—
1951–52	Guelph Biltmores	OHA-Jr.	—	—	—	—	—	11	7	7	14	4
1951–52	Guelph Biltmores	MC	—	—	—	—	—	12	10	7	17	10
1952–53	Toronto Maple Leafs	NHL	70	13	22	35	29	—	—	—	—	—
1953–54	Toronto Maple Leafs	NHL	70	14	11	25	72	—	—	—	—	—
1954–55	Toronto Maple Leafs	NHL	53	14	5	19	20	4	0	0	0	2
1955–56	Toronto Maple Leafs	NHL	69	13	14	27	35	5	1	1	2	2
1956–57	Toronto Maple Leafs	NHL	65	15	20	35	28	—	—	—	—	—
1957–58	Toronto Maple Leafs	NHL	70	15	24	39	51	—	—	—	—	—
1958–59	Toronto Maple Leafs	NHL	70	21	13	34	23	12	3	3	6	6
1959–60	Toronto Maple Leafs	NHL	67	14	20	34	28	10	0	2	2	2
1960–61	Toronto Maple Leafs	NHL	51	13	12	25	8	5	1	0	1	2
1961–62	Toronto Maple Leafs	NHL	60	8	9	17	14	11	1	6	7	4
1962–63	Toronto Maple Leafs	NHL	63	16	16	32	26	10	4	0	4	2
1963–64	Toronto Maple Leafs	NHL	65	14	5	19	46	14	0	4	4	24
1964–65	Toronto Maple Leafs	NHL	65	16	11	27	33	6	0	1	1	2
1965–66	Boston Bruins	NHL	70	20	16	36	17	—	—	—	—	—
1966–67	Boston Bruins	NHL	56	14	10	24	31	—	—	—	—	—
1967–68	St. Louis Blues	NHL	19	7	5	12	11	—	—	—	—	—
1967–68	New York Rangers	NHL	55	7	7	14	19	6	1	1	2	2
1968–69	New York Rangers	NHL	75	18	11	29	20	4	0	1	1	0
1969–70	New York Rangers	NHL	76	14	10	24	14	6	0	0	0	2
1970–71	New York Rangers	NHL	76	5	6	11	19	13	1	0	1	0
1971–72	Providence Reds	AHL	18	6	5	11	2	—	—	—	—	—
1971–72	Vancouver Canucks	NHL	42	3	1	4	10	—	—	—	—	—
1971–72	New York Rangers	NHL	13	0	2	2	2	8	2	1	3	0
1972–73	New York Rangers	NHL	11	0	1	1	0	—	—	—	—	—
1972–73	New York Islanders	NHL	22	2	2	4	4	—	—	—	—	—
NHL totals			1,353	276	253	529	560	119	14	21	35	60

== Coaching record ==
Team	Year	Regular season						Postseason
Team	Year	G	W	L	T	Pts	Finish	Result
New York Rangers	1975–76	39	15	20	4	(34)	4th in Patrick	(fired)
Los Angeles Kings	1977–78	80	31	34	15	77	3rd in Norris	Lost in preliminary round
Total		119	46	54	19			

== See also ==
- List of NHL players with 1,000 games played

Preceded by Emile Francis	Head coach of the New York Rangers; 1975–76	Succeeded by John Ferguson, Sr.
Preceded by Bob Pulford	Head coach of the Los Angeles Kings; 1977–78	Succeeded by Bob Berry
