= Claude Pronovost =

Canadian ice hockey player

- Born: July 22, 1935 Shawinigan Falls, Quebec, Canada
- Died: September 1, 2022 (aged 87) Saint-Jérôme, Quebec, Canada
- Height: 5 ft 9 in (175 cm)
- Weight: 190 lb (86 kg; 13 st 8 lb)
- Position: Goaltender
- Caught: Left
- Played for: Boston Bruins; Montreal Canadiens
- Playing career: 1952–1963

Joseph Georges Claude Pronovost (July 22, 1935 – September 1, 2022) was a Canadian ice hockey goaltender who played three games in the National Hockey League (NHL) with the Boston Bruins and Montreal Canadiens between 1956 and 1959, serving as an emergency goalie each time. The rest of his career, which lasted from 1952 to 1963, was spent in various minor leagues, mainly the Quebec Hockey League. He died on September 1. 2022 in Quebec, at the age of 87.

== Playing career ==
Pronovost was with the Montreal Canadiens as a practice goaltender in the 1955–56 season when he played his first NHL game. On January 14, 1956, the Boston Bruins arrived to play in Montreal. The Bruins were without regular starter Terry Sawchuk and were unable to use their backup John Henderson because of equipment problems. The Canadiens loaned Pronovost to the Bruins for the game, and he recorded a shutout against his own team.

Pronovost's hockey career lasted from 1952 to 1963. He spent most of his time playing in various semi-professional leagues, including the Quebec Hockey League and the Eastern Professional Hockey League. The only other time Pronovost played in the NHL was during the 1958–59 season, when he played two games for Montreal.

Claude's brothers Marcel Pronovost and Jean Pronovost also played in the NHL.

== Career statistics ==
=== Regular season and playoffs ===
			Regular season									Playoffs
Season	Team	League	GP	W	L	T	MIN	GA	SO	GAA	SV%	GP	W	L	MIN	GA	SO	GAA	SV%
1952–53	Shawinigan Falls Cataractes	QHL	2	0	2	0	120	5	0	2.50	—	—	—	—	—	—	—	—	—
1953–54	Montreal Junior Royals	QJHL	21	—	—	—	1260	80	1	3.81	—	—	—	—	—	—	—	—	—
1953–54	Kitchener Greenshirts	OHA	33	—	—	—	1980	122	2	3.70	—	—	—	—	—	—	—	—	—
1954–55	Montreal Junior Canadiens	QJHL	46	24	21	1	2760	143	2	3.10	—	5	1	4	315	23	0	4.38	—
1954–55	Chicoutimi Sagueneens	QHL	3	1	2	0	180	10	0	3.33	—	—	—	—	—	—	—	—	—
1955–56	Boston Bruins	NHL	1	1	0	0	60	0	1	0.00	1.000	—	—	—	—	—	—	—	—
1955–56	Chicoutimi Sagueneens	QHL	2	0	2	0	108	7	0	3.89	—	—	—	—	—	—	—	—	—
1955–56	Montreal Royals	QHL	9	4	5	0	540	31	0	3.44	—	—	—	—	—	—	—	—	—
1956–57	Chicoutimi Sagueneens	QHL	1	1	0	0	60	1	0	1.00	—	—	—	—	—	—	—	—	—
1956–57	Montreal Royals	QHL	9	2	6	1	554	36	0	3.90	—	—	—	—	—	—	—	—	—
1956–57	Shawinigan Falls Cataractes	QHL	11	4	7	0	662	37	1	3.35	—	—	—	—	—	—	—	—	—
1956–57	Edmonton Flyers	WHL	3	1	2	0	190	10	0	3.16	—	—	—	—	—	—	—	—	—
1957–58	Montreal Royals	QHL	16	6	9	1	960	66	1	4.13	—	1	1	0	46	1	0	1.30	—
1957–58	Shawinigan Falls Cataractes	QHL	1	0	1	0	60	5	0	5.00	—	—	—	—	—	—	—	—	—
1958–59	Montreal Canadiens	NHL	2	0	1	0	60	7	0	7.00	.774	—	—	—	—	—	—	—	—
1958–59	Montreal Royals	QHL	37	18	14	5	2220	91	2	2.46	—	6	3	3	364	15	1	2.47	—
1959–60	Calgary Stampeders	WHL	37	15	21	1	2220	125	0	3.37	—	—	—	—	—	—	—	—	—
1960–61	Montreal Royals	EPHL	27	—	—	—	1620	85	1	3.15	—	—	—	—	—	—	—	—	—
1961–62	North Bay Trappers	EPHL	4	1	3	0	240	16	0	4.00	—	—	—	—	—	—	—	—	—
1962–63	Hull-Ottawa Canadiens	EPHL	1	0	1	0	60	5	0	5.00	—	—	—	—	—	—	—	—	—
NHL totals			3	1	1	0	120	7	0	3.50	.887	—	—	—	—	—	—	—	—
