= Larry Leach (ice hockey) =

Canadian ice hockey player (1936–2018)

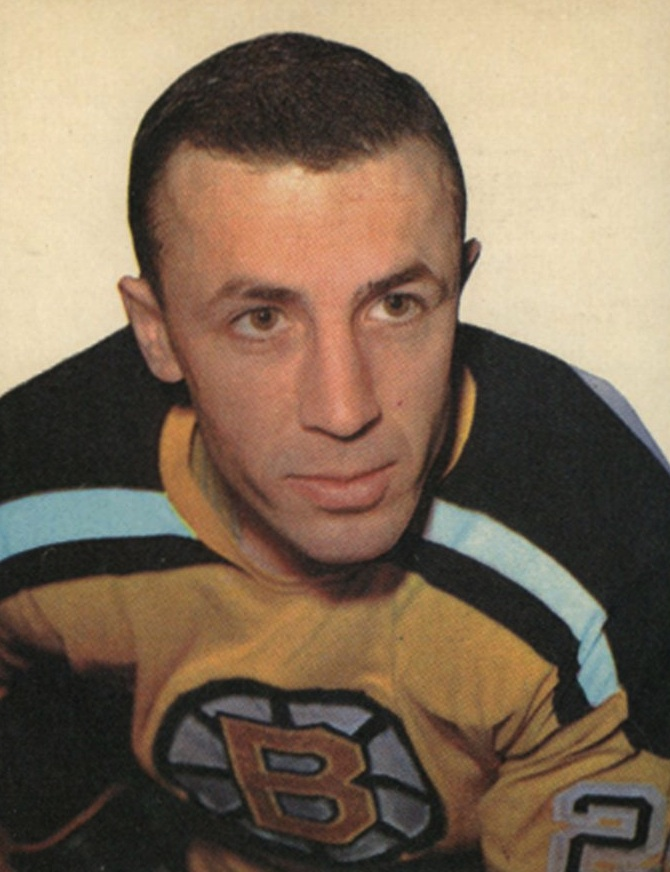
- Born: June 18, 1936 Lloydminster, Saskatchewan, Canada
- Died: May 8, 2018 (aged 81) Victoria, British Columbia, Canada
- Height: 6 ft 2 in (188 cm)
- Weight: 175 lb (79 kg; 12 st 7 lb)
- Position: Centre
- Shot: Left
- Played for: Boston Bruins
- Playing career: 1956–1973

Lawrence Raymond "Larry" Leach (June 18, 1936 – May 8, 2018) was a Canadian ice hockey centre. He played three seasons for the Boston Bruins between 1958 and 1962. He played a sporadic third and fourth line centre role while in Boston. The rest of his career, which lasted from 1956 to 1973, was spent in the minor leagues.

== Career statistics ==
=== Regular season and playoffs ===
			Regular season					Playoffs
Season	Team	League	GP	G	A	Pts	PIM	GP	G	A	Pts	PIM
1953–54	Humboldt Indians	SJHL	46	8	6	14	20	5	1	0	1	2
1954–55	Humboldt Indians	SJHL	47	6	9	15	8	10	0	1	1	4
1954–55	Humboldt Indians	M-Cup	—	—	—	—	—	4	0	0	0	4
1955–56	Humboldt Indians	SJHL	45	22	35	57	27	5	2	3	5	8
1955–56	Victoria Cougars	WHL	3	1	0	1	6	4	0	0	0	0
1956–57	Vancouver Canucks	WHL	66	6	10	16	72	3	0	0	0	2
1957–58	Vancouver Canucks	WHL	33	7	9	16	23	—	—	—	—	—
1957–58	Springfield Indians	AHL	35	1	9	10	8	13	3	1	4	12
1958–59	Boston Bruins	NHL	29	4	12	16	26	7	1	1	2	8
1958–59	Providence Reds	AHL	37	12	17	29	24	—	—	—	—	—
1959–60	Boston Bruins	NHL	69	7	12	19	47	—	—	—	—	—
1960–61	Portland Buckaroos	WHL	54	13	16	29	80	14	6	7	13	22
1961–62	Boston Bruins	NHL	28	2	5	7	18	—	—	—	—	—
1961–62	Providence Reds	AHL	25	8	11	19	33	—	—	—	—	—
1962–63	Providence Reds	AHL	55	22	24	46	56	—	—	—	—	—
1963–64	Providence Reds	AHL	60	12	30	42	43	3	1	1	2	16
1964–65	Portland Buckaroos	WHL	52	7	10	17	48	10	2	1	3	6
1965–66	Portland Buckaroos	WHL	72	18	23	41	57	3	0	0	0	6
1966–67	Portland Buckaroos	WHL	60	18	17	35	43	4	0	0	0	0
1967–68	Portland Buckaroos	WHL	72	21	20	41	48	11	1	0	1	8
1968–69	Portland Buckaroos	WHL	72	8	18	26	50	9	0	0	0	2
1969–70	Portland Buckaroos	WHL	72	6	17	23	44	11	0	2	2	12
1970–71	Portland Buckaroos	WHL	60	6	15	21	28	11	3	3	6	6
1971–72	Portland Buckaroos	WHL	54	15	21	36	32	6	0	0	0	6
1972–73	Portland Buckaroos	WHL	71	5	14	19	42	—	—	—	—	—
WHL totals			741	131	190	321	573	86	12	13	25	70
NHL totals			126	13	29	42	91	7	1	1	2	8
