= 1955–56 NHL transactions =

The following is a list of all team-to-team transactions that have occurred in the National Hockey League (NHL) during the 1955–56 NHL season. It lists which team each player has been traded to and for which player(s) or other consideration(s), if applicable.

== Transactions ==
May 27, 1955	To Detroit Red Wings David Creighton; Bucky Hollingworth; John McCormack; Jerry Toppazzini	To Chicago Black Hawks Tony Leswick; Glen Skov; Johnny Wilson; Benny Woit
June 3, 1955	To Boston Bruins Marcel Bonin; Lorne Davis; Terry Sawchuk; Vic Stasiuk	To Detroit Red Wings Gilles Boisvert; Real Chevrefils; Norm Corcoran; Warren Godfrey; Ed Sandford
July 3, 1955^{1}	To Montreal Canadiens Max Quackenbush	To Chicago Black Hawks Fred Burchell
August 18, 1955	To Detroit Red Wings Billy Dea; Aggie Kukulowicz cash	To New York Rangers Dave Creighton; Bronco Horvath
August 29, 1955	To Toronto Maple Leafs $2,000 cash	To New York Rangers Tom McCarthy
September, 1955 (exact date unknown)^{2}	To Toronto Maple Leafs Gary Collins	To Chicago Black Hawks rights to Hank Ciesla
September, 1955 (exact date unknown)^{2}	To Montreal Canadiens Bob Duncan	To Chicago Black Hawks rights to Hank Ciesla
October 4, 1955^{3}	To Detroit Red Wings Wally Blaisdell	To Chicago Black Hawks Norm Corcoran
October 24, 1955	To Detroit Red Wings Metro Prystai	To Chicago Black Hawks Ed Sandford
January 17, 1956	To Detroit Red Wings loan of Gord Pennell cash	To Chicago Black Hawks Norm Corcoran
January 17, 1956	To Boston Bruins Real Chevrefils; Jerry Toppazzini	To Detroit Red Wings Murray Costello; Lorne Ferguson

Notes

1. Transaction voided when Quackenbush retired on July 15, 1955.
2. Rights claimed by both Montreal and Toronto out of junior. Rights traded to Chicago by Buffalo (AHL) for $15,000 with Montreal receiving Bob Duncan and Toronto receiving Gary Collins.
3. Transaction voided when Blaisdell was not able to report to Detroit (date unknown).
