= 1955–56 Detroit Red Wings season =

National Hockey League team season

1955–56 Detroit Red Wings
- League: 2nd NHL
- 1955–56 record: 30–24–16
- Home record: 21–6–8
- Road record: 9–18–8
- Goals for: 183
- Goals against: 148

Team information
- General manager: Jack Adams
- Coach: Jimmy Skinner
- Captain: Ted Lindsay
- Alternate captains: Red Kelly
- Arena: Detroit Olympia

Team leaders
- Goals: Gordie Howe (38)
- Assists: Gordie Howe (41)
- Points: Gordie Howe (79)
- Penalty minutes: Ted Lindsay (161)
- Wins: Glenn Hall (30)
- Goals against average: Glenn Hall (2.10)

The 1955–56 Detroit Red Wings season was the Red Wings' 30th season.

== Regular season ==
=== Final standings ===
National Hockey League
		GP	W	L	T	GF	GA	DIFF	Pts
1	Montreal Canadiens	70	45	15	10	222	131	+91	100
2	Detroit Red Wings	70	30	24	16	183	148	+35	76
3	New York Rangers	70	32	28	10	204	203	+1	74
4	Toronto Maple Leafs	70	24	33	13	153	181	−28	61
5	Boston Bruins	70	23	34	13	147	185	−38	59
6	Chicago Black Hawks	70	19	39	12	155	216	−61	50

=== Record vs. opponents ===
1955–56 NHL Records
Team	BOS	CHI	DET	MTL	NYR	TOR
Boston	—	3–8–3	3–8–3	5–8–1	7–5–2	5–5–4
Chicago	8–3–3	—	2–8–4	1–12–1	3–10–1	5–6–3
Detroit	8–3–3	8–2–4	—	4–8–2	5–6–3	5–5–4
Montreal	8–5–1	12–1–1	8–4–2	—	8–2–4	9–3–2
New York	5–7–2	10–3–1	6–5–3	2–8–4	—	9–5
Toronto	5–5–4	6–5–3	5–5–4	3–9–2	5–9	—

== Schedule and results ==
1955–56 regular season
October

Game	Result	Date	Score	Opponent	Record
1	L	October 6, 1955	2–3	Chicago Black Hawks (1955–56)	0–1–0
2	L	October 8, 1955	2–4	@ Toronto Maple Leafs (1955–56)	0–2–0
3	L	October 9, 1955	2–3	New York Rangers (1955–56)	0–3–0
4	W	October 15, 1955	4–1	@ Chicago Black Hawks (1955–56)	1–3–0
5	W	October 16, 1955	6–0	Toronto Maple Leafs (1955–56)	2–3–0
6	T	October 20, 1955	2–2	Chicago Black Hawks (1955–56)	2–3–1
7	T	October 22, 1955	0–0	Boston Bruins (1955–56)	2–3–2
8	L	October 26, 1955	2–6	@ New York Rangers (1955–56)	2–4–2
9	L	October 29, 1955	1–2	@ Montreal Canadiens (1955–56)	2–5–2
10	T	October 30, 1955	2–2	Montreal Canadiens (1955–56)	2–5–3

November

Game	Result	Date	Score	Opponent	Record
11	L	November 2, 1955	1–3	@ Toronto Maple Leafs (1955–56)	2–6–3
12	T	November 3, 1955	1–1	New York Rangers (1955–56)	2–6–4
13	T	November 5, 1955	3–3	@ Chicago Black Hawks (1955–56)	2–6–5
14	W	November 6, 1955	4–1	Toronto Maple Leafs (1955–56)	3–6–5
15	T	November 10, 1955	2–2	Chicago Black Hawks (1955–56)	3–6–6
16	L	November 12, 1955	0–3	@ Montreal Canadiens (1955–56)	3–7–6
17	T	November 13, 1955	0–0	@ Boston Bruins (1955–56)	3–7–7
18	T	November 16, 1955	3–3	@ New York Rangers (1955–56)	3–7–8
19	W	November 19, 1955	4–1	Chicago Black Hawks (1955–56)	4–7–8
20	T	November 20, 1955	1–1	@ Chicago Black Hawks (1955–56)	4–7–9
21	W	November 24, 1955	3–2	Montreal Canadiens (1955–56)	5–7–9
22	L	November 27, 1955	1–2	Toronto Maple Leafs (1955–56)	5–8–9
23	T	November 30, 1955	3–3	@ Toronto Maple Leafs (1955–56)	5–8–10

December

Game	Result	Date	Score	Opponent	Record
24	W	December 3, 1955	5–0	@ Boston Bruins (1955–56)	6–8–10
25	L	December 4, 1955	3–7	@ New York Rangers (1955–56)	6–9–10
26	T	December 8, 1955	2–2	Boston Bruins (1955–56)	6–9–11
27	L	December 10, 1955	2–4	@ Montreal Canadiens (1955–56)	6–10–11
28	W	December 11, 1955	2–0	New York Rangers (1955–56)	7–10–11
29	W	December 15, 1955	4–0	Toronto Maple Leafs (1955–56)	8–10–11
30	W	December 18, 1955	2–0	Montreal Canadiens (1955–56)	9–10–11
31	W	December 22, 1955	3–2	@ Boston Bruins (1955–56)	10–10–11
32	L	December 24, 1955	2–4	@ Montreal Canadiens (1955–56)	10–11–11
33	T	December 25, 1955	1–1	Toronto Maple Leafs (1955–56)	10–11–12
34	W	December 29, 1955	4–3	Boston Bruins (1955–56)	11–11–12
35	T	December 31, 1955	2–2	@ Toronto Maple Leafs (1955–56)	11–11–13

January

Game	Result	Date	Score	Opponent	Record
36	W	January 1, 1956	5–1	Chicago Black Hawks (1955–56)	12–11–13
37	L	January 4, 1956	4–5	@ New York Rangers (1955–56)	12–12–13
38	W	January 5, 1956	5–2	@ Montreal Canadiens (1955–56)	13–12–13
39	W	January 8, 1956	4–3	Boston Bruins (1955–56)	14–12–13
40	W	January 12, 1956	6–0	New York Rangers (1955–56)	15–12–13
41	W	January 14, 1956	3–1	@ Chicago Black Hawks (1955–56)	16–12–13
42	W	January 15, 1956	2–0	Montreal Canadiens (1955–56)	17–12–13
43	W	January 19, 1956	4–2	Boston Bruins (1955–56)	18–12–13
44	L	January 21, 1956	2–4	@ Toronto Maple Leafs (1955–56)	18–13–13
45	W	January 22, 1956	4–1	Toronto Maple Leafs (1955–56)	19–13–13
46	W	January 26, 1956	3–2	New York Rangers (1955–56)	20–13–13
47	W	January 27, 1956	7–0	@ Chicago Black Hawks (1955–56)	21–13–13
48	T	January 29, 1956	1–1	Montreal Canadiens (1955–56)	21–13–14

February

Game	Result	Date	Score	Opponent	Record
49	L	February 2, 1956	0–2	Montreal Canadiens (1955–56)	21–14–14
50	L	February 4, 1956	1–2	@ Montreal Canadiens (1955–56)	21–15–14
51	L	February 5, 1956	1–3	@ Boston Bruins (1955–56)	21–16–14
52	W	February 7, 1956	3–2	Chicago Black Hawks (1955–56)	22–16–14
53	L	February 11, 1956	2–3	@ Boston Bruins (1955–56)	22–17–14
54	L	February 12, 1956	1–2	@ New York Rangers (1955–56)	22–18–14
55	W	February 14, 1956	5–3	New York Rangers (1955–56)	23–18–14
56	W	February 18, 1956	6–1	@ Toronto Maple Leafs (1955–56)	24–18–14
57	L	February 19, 1956	3–5	@ Chicago Black Hawks (1955–56)	24–19–14
58	W	February 21, 1956	4–1	Boston Bruins (1955–56)	25–19–14
59	L	February 25, 1956	1–5	@ Montreal Canadiens (1955–56)	25–20–14
60	L	February 26, 1956	2–3	@ New York Rangers (1955–56)	25–21–14
61	W	February 28, 1956	4–1	New York Rangers (1955–56)	26–21–14

March

Game	Result	Date	Score	Opponent	Record
62	W	March 1, 1956	2–0	@ Boston Bruins (1955–56)	27–21–14
63	T	March 3, 1956	2–2	@ Toronto Maple Leafs (1955–56)	27–21–15
64	L	March 4, 1956	4–6	Montreal Canadiens (1955–56)	27–22–15
65	W	March 8, 1956	4–2	Boston Bruins (1955–56)	28–22–15
66	W	March 10, 1956	2–0	Chicago Black Hawks (1955–56)	29–22–15
67	W	March 11, 1956	3–2	@ Chicago Black Hawks (1955–56)	30–22–15
68	L	March 13, 1956	0–4	@ Boston Bruins (1955–56)	30–23–15
69	T	March 15, 1956	2–2	@ New York Rangers (1955–56)	30–23–16
70	L	March 18, 1956	0–2	Toronto Maple Leafs (1955–56)	30–24–16

Legend: Win (2 points) Loss (0 points) Tie (1 point)

== Player statistics ==
=== Regular season ===
Scoring

Player	Pos	GP	G	A	Pts	PIM
Gordie Howe	RW	70	38	41	79	100
Dutch Reibel	C	68	17	39	56	10
Alex Delvecchio	C/LW	70	25	26	51	24
Ted Lindsay	LW	67	27	23	50	161
Red Kelly	D/C	70	16	34	50	39
Metro Prystai	C	63	12	16	28	10
Bill Dineen	RW	70	12	7	19	30
Bob Goldham	D	68	3	16	19	32
Norm Ullman	C	66	9	9	18	26
Marty Pavelich	LW	70	5	13	18	38
Marcel Pronovost	D	68	4	13	17	46
Lorne Ferguson	LW	31	8	7	15	12
John Bucyk	LW	38	1	8	9	20
Warren Godfrey	D	67	2	6	8	86
Jerry Toppazzini	RW	40	1	7	8	31
Real Chevrefils	LW	38	3	4	7	24
Larry Hillman	D	47	0	3	3	53
Gord Hollingworth	D	41	0	2	2	28
Cummy Burton	RW	3	0	0	0	0
Norm Corcoran	C/RW	2	0	0	0	0
Murray Costello	C	24	0	0	0	4
Glenn Hall	G	70	0	0	0	14
Ed Sandford	LW	4	0	0	0	0
Ed Stankiewicz	C	5	0	0	0	0

Goaltending

Player	MIN	GP	W	L	T	GA	GAA	SO
Glenn Hall	4200	70	30	24	16	147	2.10	12
Team:	4200	70	30	24	16	147	2.10	12

=== Playoffs ===
Scoring

Player	Pos	GP	G	A	Pts	PIM
Gordie Howe	RW	10	3	9	12	8
Alex Delvecchio	C/LW	10	7	3	10	2
Ted Lindsay	LW	10	6	3	9	22
Red Kelly	D/C	10	2	4	6	2
Norm Ullman	C	10	1	3	4	13
Lorne Ferguson	LW	10	1	2	3	12
Metro Prystai	C	9	1	2	3	6
Bob Goldham	D	10	0	3	3	4
John Bucyk	LW	10	1	1	2	8
Marcel Pronovost	D	10	0	2	2	8
Dutch Reibel	C	10	0	2	2	2
Bill Dineen	RW	10	1	0	1	8
Al Arbour	D	4	0	1	1	0
Larry Hillman	D	10	0	1	1	6
Marty Pavelich	LW	10	0	1	1	14
Cummy Burton	RW	3	0	0	0	0
Murray Costello	C	4	0	0	0	0
Glenn Hall	G	10	0	0	0	0
Gord Hollingworth	D	3	0	0	0	2
Gerry Melnyk	C	6	0	0	0	0

Goaltending

Player	MIN	GP	W	L	GA	GAA	SO
Glenn Hall	604	10	5	5	28	2.78	0
Team:	604	10	5	5	28	2.78	0

Note: GP = Games played; G = Goals; A = Assists; Pts = Points; +/- = Plus-minus PIM = Penalty minutes; PPG = Power-play goals; SHG = Short-handed goals; GWG = Game-winning goals;
MIN = Minutes played; W = Wins; L = Losses; T = Ties; GA = Goals against; GAA = Goals-against average; SO = Shutouts;

== See also ==
- 1955–56 NHL season
