= 1956 Boston Bruins exhibition game in Newfoundland =

Outdoor National Hockey League game

1956 Boston Bruins exhibition game
	1	2	3	Total
Boston Bruins	—	—	—	—
Conception Bay; North Hockey League	—	—	—	—
- Date: April 9, 1956
- Venue: Conception Bay Sports Arena
- City: Bay Roberts

The 1956 Boston Bruins exhibition game in Newfoundland, played on April 9, was the first outdoor ice hockey game played in Canada featuring a team from the National Hockey League (NHL).

== Background ==
The 1955–56 Boston Bruins ended the 1955–56 NHL season in fifth place with a record of 23–34–13, missing the final playoff spot, which went to the 1955–56 Toronto Maple Leafs with a record of 24–33–13. On March 22, it was reported that the Bruins would play an exhibition series of games "throughout the Maritimes and possibly Newfoundland." During this era, it was customary for NHL teams that did not make the playoffs to go on a postseason exhibition tour.

Starting in late March 1956, the Bruins played exhibition games in New Brunswick, including a seven-game series against the Beavers of Saint John contested at multiple venues. The Bruins then played in Newfoundland at Corner Brook (April 7), Bay Roberts (April 9), St. John's (April 10–12), Grand Falls (April 14), and Gander (date unclear). These exhibition games were not held under normal rules, as members of the Bruins would sometimes change teams with local players.

== Game ==
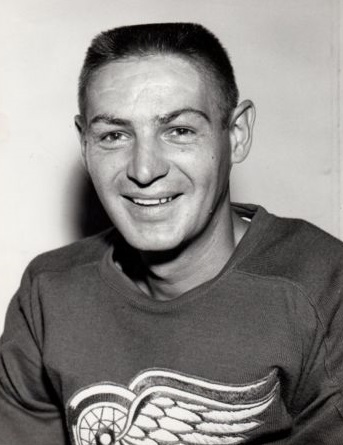
Terry Sawchuk in 1963

The April 9 game was played in Bay Roberts, Newfoundland, at the Conception Bay Sports Arena, an unfinished outdoor arena with an artificial ice surface that had opened in February 1956. In keeping with the exhibition nature of the game, each of the four local teams from the Conception Bay North Hockey League played a period against the Bruins, and the game wound up with a "free-for-all" where all 23 members of the local teams played at once against the Bruins. At some point, local player Gerard Saunders scored a goal against Bruins' goaltender Terry Sawchuk, one of only three goals that Sawchuk allowed during the Newfoundland exhibition games.

The game was historic as it was only the second ice hockey match played outdoors that featured an NHL team—the first had been the 1954 Detroit Red Wings prison game in Michigan. It also had significance as the first outdoor game in Canada featuring an NHL team, and the first to be open to public spectators. The next outdoor game to be held in Canada with NHL participation would be the 2003 Heritage Classic in Edmonton.
