= 9th National Hockey League All-Star Game =

Professional ice hockey exhibition game

9th NHL All-Star Game
	1	2	3	Total
All-Star team	0	0	1	1
Detroit Red Wings	0	2	1	3
- Date: October 2, 1955
- Arena: Detroit Olympia
- City: Detroit
- Attendance: 10,111

The 9th National Hockey League All-Star Game took place at the Detroit Olympia, home of the Detroit Red Wings, on October 2, 1955. The Red Wings, winner of the 1955 Stanley Cup Final, played a team of All-Stars, winning by a score of 3–1.

== Uniforms ==
When the NHL mandated that all teams must have a white jersey beginning with the 1951–52 NHL season, the league at the time chose to make the white jersey the designated home uniform. However, prior to the 1955–56 season, the NHL reversed the designation, requiring home teams to wear their dark jerseys and visitors to wear white. As the first All-Star Game under these rules, the Red Wings wore their red uniforms, while the All-Stars wore the white uniforms worn by the Second Team All-Stars in 1951 and 1952. The white All-Star uniform with blue and red trim would continue to be worn through 1959. The white jersey would be adapted into a throwback worn by the Wales Conference All-Stars in the 1992 All-Star Game.

== Game summary ==
	NHL All-Stars	Detroit Red Wings
Final score	1	3
Head coach	Dick Irvin (Chicago Black Hawks)	Jimmy Skinner (Detroit Red Wings)
Lineup	Starting lineup: 2 - D Doug Harvey (Montreal Canadiens); 3 - D Fern Flaman (Boston Bruins); 4 - C Jean Beliveau (Montreal Canadiens); 5 - RW Bernie Geoffrion (Montreal Canadiens); 6 - RW Leo Labine (Boston Bruins); 7 - RW Ed Litzenberger (Chicago Black Hawks); 8 - LW Danny Lewicki (New York Rangers); 9 - G Harry Lumley (Toronto Maple Leafs); 10 - D Jim Morrison (Toronto Maple Leafs); 11 - C Ken Mosdell (Montreal Canadiens); 12 - RW Maurice Richard (Montreal Canadiens); 13 - LW Sid Smith (Toronto Maple Leafs); 14 - D Allan Stanley (Chicago Black Hawks); 15 - G Terry Sawchuk (Boston Bruins); 16 - C Red Sullivan (Chicago Black Hawks); 17 - C Ron Stewart (Toronto Maple Leafs); 18 - LW Harry Watson (Chicago Black Hawks); 20 - D Frank Martin (Chicago Black Hawks)	Starting lineup: 1 - G Glenn Hall; 2 - D Bob Goldham; 3 - D Marcel Pronovost; 4 - D Red Kelly; 5 - D Warren Godfrey; 7 - LW Ted Lindsay, C; 8 - C Earl Reibel; 9 - RW Gordie Howe; 10 - C Alex Delvecchio; 11 - LW Marty Pavelich; 12 - LW Ed Sandford; 14 - LW Real Chevrefils; 15 - D Larry Hillman; 16 - C Norm Ullman; 17 - RW Bill Dineen; 18 - D Gord Hollingworth; 19 - RW Jerry Toppazzini; 20 - LW Johnny Bucyk; 21 - C Norm Corcoran
Scoring summary	Harvey (Beliveau, Smith), 16:38	Howe (Reibel, Delvecchio), 0:57 2nd (PPG); Reibel (Howe, Lindsay), 5:43; Reibel (Goldham, Lindsay), 19:33 (ENG)
Penalties	Flaman, 1:28 1st; Geoffrion, 9:04 1st; Stewart, 10:32 1st; Stanley, 16:14 1st; Morrison, 19:14 1st; Harvey, 12:28 3rd	Corcoran, 8:46 1st; Bucyk, 15:16 1st; Corcoran, 6:40 2nd; Hollingworth, 16:01 2nd; Hollingworth, 10:54 3rd
Win/loss	L - Harry Lumley	W - Glenn Hall

- Referee: Frank Udvari
- Linesmen: George Hayes, Scotty Morrison

== Notes ==
- ^1Named to the first All-Star team in 1954–55.
- ^2Named to the second All-Star team in 1954–55.
