= 1955–56 Montreal Canadiens season =

NHL hockey team season (won Stanley Cup)

1955–56 Montreal Canadiens
- Stanley Cup champions
- Prince of Wales Trophy winners
- League: 1st NHL
- 1955–56 record: 45–15–10
- Home record: 29–5–1
- Road record: 16–10–9
- Goals for: 222
- Goals against: 131

Team information
- General manager: Frank J. Selke
- Coach: Toe Blake
- Captain: Emile Bouchard
- Arena: Montreal Forum

Team leaders
- Goals: Jean Beliveau, 47
- Assists: Bert Olmstead, 56
- Points: Jean Beliveau, 88
- Penalty minutes: Jean Beliveau, 143
- Wins: Jacques Plante (42)
- Goals against average: Jacques Plante (1.86)

The 1955–56 Montreal Canadiens season was the team's 47th season of play. The Canadiens placed first in the regular season standings (with their 45 wins setting an NHL record) and won the Stanley Cup for the eighth time in the club's history.

== Regular season ==
=== Final standings ===
National Hockey League
| | | GP | W | L | T | GF | GA | DIFF | Pts |
|---|---|---|---|---|---|---|---|---|---|
| 1 | Montreal Canadiens | 70 | 45 | 15 | 10 | 222 | 131 | +91 | 100 |
| 2 | Detroit Red Wings | 70 | 30 | 24 | 16 | 183 | 148 | +35 | 76 |
| 3 | New York Rangers | 70 | 32 | 28 | 10 | 204 | 203 | +1 | 74 |
| 4 | Toronto Maple Leafs | 70 | 24 | 33 | 13 | 153 | 181 | −28 | 61 |
| 5 | Boston Bruins | 70 | 23 | 34 | 13 | 147 | 185 | −38 | 59 |
| 6 | Chicago Black Hawks | 70 | 19 | 39 | 12 | 155 | 216 | −61 | 50 |

=== Record vs. opponents ===
1955–56 NHL Records
| Team | BOS | CHI | DET | MTL | NYR | TOR |
|---|---|---|---|---|---|---|
| Boston | — | 3–8–3 | 3–8–3 | 5–8–1 | 7–5–2 | 5–5–4 |
| Chicago | 8–3–3 | — | 2–8–4 | 1–12–1 | 3–10–1 | 5–6–3 |
| Detroit | 8–3–3 | 8–2–4 | — | 4–8–2 | 5–6–3 | 5–5–4 |
| Montreal | 8–5–1 | 12–1–1 | 8–4–2 | — | 8–2–4 | 9–3–2 |
| New York | 5–7–2 | 10–3–1 | 6–5–3 | 2–8–4 | — | 9–5 |
| Toronto | 5–5–4 | 6–5–3 | 5–5–4 | 3–9–2 | 5–9 | — |

== Schedule and results ==
1955–56 regular season
October

| Game | Result | Date | Score | Opponent | Record |
|---|---|---|---|---|---|
| 1 | W | October 6, 1955 | 2–0 | Toronto Maple Leafs (1955–56) | 1–0–0 |
| 2 | W | October 8, 1955 | 2–0 | Boston Bruins (1955–56) | 2–0–0 |
| 3 | W | October 9, 1955 | 5–2 | @ Boston Bruins (1955–56) | 3–0–0 |
| 4 | W | October 15, 1955 | 4–1 | New York Rangers (1955–56) | 4–0–0 |
| 5 | T | October 16, 1955 | 2–2 | @ Chicago Black Hawks (1955–56) | 4–0–1 |
| 6 | L | October 20, 1955 | 2–3 | Boston Bruins (1955–56) | 4–1–1 |
| 7 | W | October 22, 1955 | 6–0 | Chicago Black Hawks (1955–56) | 5–1–1 |
| 8 | L | October 26, 1955 | 1–2 | @ Toronto Maple Leafs (1955–56) | 5–2–1 |
| 9 | L | October 27, 1955 | 1–4 | Chicago Black Hawks (1955–56) | 5–3–1 |
| 10 | W | October 29, 1955 | 2–1 | Detroit Red Wings (1955–56) | 6–3–1 |
| 11 | T | October 30, 1955 | 2–2 | @ Detroit Red Wings (1955–56) | 6–3–2 |

November

| Game | Result | Date | Score | Opponent | Record |
|---|---|---|---|---|---|
| 12 | T | November 3, 1955 | 3–3 | Toronto Maple Leafs (1955–56) | 6–3–3 |
| 13 | W | November 5, 1955 | 4–2 | Boston Bruins (1955–56) | 7–3–3 |
| 14 | T | November 6, 1955 | 3–3 | @ Boston Bruins (1955–56) | 7–3–4 |
| 15 | T | November 9, 1955 | 1–1 | @ New York Rangers (1955–56) | 7–3–5 |
| 16 | W | November 12, 1955 | 3–0 | Detroit Red Wings (1955–56) | 8–3–5 |
| 17 | W | November 13, 1955 | 2–0 | @ Chicago Black Hawks (1955–56) | 9–3–5 |
| 18 | W | November 16, 1955 | 3–2 | @ Toronto Maple Leafs (1955–56) | 10–3–5 |
| 19 | W | November 19, 1955 | 6–1 | New York Rangers (1955–56) | 11–3–5 |
| 20 | T | November 20, 1955 | 1–1 | @ New York Rangers (1955–56) | 11–3–6 |
| 21 | L | November 24, 1955 | 2–3 | @ Detroit Red Wings (1955–56) | 11–4–6 |
| 22 | W | November 26, 1955 | 3–1 | Boston Bruins (1955–56) | 12–4–6 |
| 23 | T | November 27, 1955 | 3–3 | @ New York Rangers (1955–56) | 12–4–7 |

December

| Game | Result | Date | Score | Opponent | Record |
|---|---|---|---|---|---|
| 24 | W | December 1, 1955 | 2–1 | @ Boston Bruins (1955–56) | 13–4–7 |
| 25 | W | December 3, 1955 | 3–1 | @ Toronto Maple Leafs (1955–56) | 14–4–7 |
| 26 | W | December 4, 1955 | 5–1 | @ Chicago Black Hawks (1955–56) | 15–4–7 |
| 27 | W | December 8, 1955 | 3–1 | Toronto Maple Leafs (1955–56) | 16–4–7 |
| 28 | W | December 10, 1955 | 4–2 | Detroit Red Wings (1955–56) | 17–4–7 |
| 29 | W | December 11, 1955 | 4–2 | @ Boston Bruins (1955–56) | 18–4–7 |
| 30 | W | December 15, 1955 | 2–0 | New York Rangers (1955–56) | 19–4–7 |
| 31 | W | December 17, 1955 | 5–0 | Chicago Black Hawks (1955–56) | 20–4–7 |
| 32 | L | December 18, 1955 | 0–2 | @ Detroit Red Wings (1955–56) | 20–5–7 |
| 33 | W | December 20, 1955 | 7–1 | @ Chicago Black Hawks (1955–56) | 21–5–7 |
| 34 | W | December 24, 1955 | 4–2 | Detroit Red Wings (1955–56) | 22–5–7 |
| 35 | L | December 25, 1955 | 1–5 | @ New York Rangers (1955–56) | 22–6–7 |
| 36 | L | December 28, 1955 | 0–2 | @ Toronto Maple Leafs (1955–56) | 22–7–7 |
| 37 | W | December 29, 1955 | 5–2 | Toronto Maple Leafs (1955–56) | 23–7–7 |
| 38 | W | December 31, 1955 | 7–3 | Chicago Black Hawks (1955–56) | 24–7–7 |

January

| Game | Result | Date | Score | Opponent | Record |
|---|---|---|---|---|---|
| 39 | L | January 5, 1956 | 2–5 | Detroit Red Wings (1955–56) | 24–8–7 |
| 40 | W | January 7, 1956 | 3–1 | Chicago Black Hawks (1955–56) | 25–8–7 |
| 41 | L | January 11, 1956 | 1–6 | @ New York Rangers (1955–56) | 25–9–7 |
| 42 | L | January 14, 1956 | 0–2 | Boston Bruins (1955–56) | 25–10–7 |
| 43 | L | January 15, 1956 | 0–2 | @ Detroit Red Wings (1955–56) | 25–11–7 |
| 44 | W | January 18, 1956 | 3–2 | @ Toronto Maple Leafs (1955–56) | 26–11–7 |
| 45 | W | January 19, 1956 | 3–1 | Toronto Maple Leafs (1955–56) | 27–11–7 |
| 46 | W | January 21, 1956 | 3–1 | New York Rangers (1955–56) | 28–11–7 |
| 47 | W | January 22, 1956 | 6–2 | @ Chicago Black Hawks (1955–56) | 29–11–7 |
| 48 | L | January 26, 1956 | 1–5 | @ Boston Bruins (1955–56) | 29–12–7 |
| 49 | W | January 28, 1956 | 6–1 | Boston Bruins (1955–56) | 30–12–7 |
| 50 | T | January 29, 1956 | 1–1 | @ Detroit Red Wings (1955–56) | 30–12–8 |

February

| Game | Result | Date | Score | Opponent | Record |
|---|---|---|---|---|---|
| 51 | W | February 2, 1956 | 2–0 | @ Detroit Red Wings (1955–56) | 31–12–8 |
| 52 | W | February 4, 1956 | 2–1 | Detroit Red Wings (1955–56) | 32–12–8 |
| 53 | T | February 5, 1956 | 3–3 | @ New York Rangers (1955–56) | 32–12–9 |
| 54 | T | February 8, 1956 | 1–1 | @ Toronto Maple Leafs (1955–56) | 32–12–10 |
| 55 | W | February 10, 1956 | 3–1 | @ Chicago Black Hawks (1955–56) | 33–12–10 |
| 56 | W | February 12, 1956 | 7–1 | @ Boston Bruins (1955–56) | 34–12–10 |
| 57 | W | February 16, 1956 | 8–1 | Toronto Maple Leafs (1955–56) | 35–12–10 |
| 58 | W | February 18, 1956 | 9–4 | New York Rangers (1955–56) | 36–12–10 |
| 59 | W | February 23, 1956 | 5–2 | New York Rangers (1955–56) | 37–12–10 |
| 60 | W | February 25, 1956 | 5–1 | Detroit Red Wings (1955–56) | 38–12–10 |
| 61 | L | February 29, 1956 | 1–4 | @ Toronto Maple Leafs (1955–56) | 38–13–10 |

March

| Game | Result | Date | Score | Opponent | Record |
|---|---|---|---|---|---|
| 62 | W | March 2, 1956 | 3–1 | @ Chicago Black Hawks (1955–56) | 39–13–10 |
| 63 | W | March 3, 1956 | 3–1 | Chicago Black Hawks (1955–56) | 40–13–10 |
| 64 | W | March 4, 1956 | 6–4 | @ Detroit Red Wings (1955–56) | 41–13–10 |
| 65 | W | March 8, 1956 | 4–3 | Toronto Maple Leafs (1955–56) | 42–13–10 |
| 66 | L | March 10, 1956 | 0–4 | Boston Bruins (1955–56) | 42–14–10 |
| 67 | L | March 11, 1956 | 1–3 | @ Boston Bruins (1955–56) | 42–15–10 |
| 68 | W | March 15, 1956 | 5–2 | Chicago Black Hawks (1955–56) | 43–15–10 |
| 69 | W | March 17, 1956 | 7–2 | New York Rangers (1955–56) | 44–15–10 |
| 70 | W | March 18, 1956 | 3–1 | @ New York Rangers (1955–56) | 45–15–10 |

Legend: Win (2 points) Loss (0 points) Tie (1 point)

== Playoffs ==
=== Stanley Cup Finals ===
This was the first Finals for Henri Richard and Toe Blake's first Finals as coach. The Canadiens faced the Detroit Red Wings for the fourth time in five years, having lost in 1952, 1954, and 1955. This year, they won in five games.

Detroit Red Wings vs. Montreal Canadiens

| Date | Away | Score | Home | Score | Notes |
|---|---|---|---|---|---|
| March 31 | Detroit | 4 | Montreal | 6 | |
| April 3 | Detroit | 1 | Montreal | 5 | |
| April 5 | Montreal | 1 | Detroit | 3 | |
| April 8 | Montreal | 3 | Detroit | 0 | |
| April 10 | Detroit | 1 | Montreal | 3 | |

Montreal won the best-of-seven series 4 games to 1.

== Player statistics ==
=== Regular season ===
==== Scoring ====
| Player | Pos | GP | G | A | Pts | PIM |
|---|---|---|---|---|---|---|
| Jean Beliveau | C | 70 | 47 | 41 | 88 | 143 |
| Maurice Richard | RW | 70 | 38 | 33 | 71 | 89 |
| Bert Olmstead | LW | 70 | 14 | 56 | 70 | 94 |
| Bernie Geoffrion | RW | 59 | 29 | 33 | 62 | 66 |
| Dickie Moore | LW | 70 | 11 | 39 | 50 | 55 |
| Doug Harvey | D | 62 | 5 | 39 | 44 | 60 |
| Henri Richard | C | 64 | 19 | 21 | 40 | 46 |
| Floyd Curry | RW | 70 | 14 | 18 | 32 | 10 |
| Ken Mosdell | C | 67 | 13 | 17 | 30 | 48 |
| Claude Provost | RW | 60 | 13 | 16 | 29 | 30 |
| Jack LeClair | C | 54 | 6 | 8 | 14 | 30 |
| Jean-Guy Talbot | D | 66 | 1 | 13 | 14 | 80 |
| Dollard St. Laurent | D | 46 | 4 | 9 | 13 | 58 |
| Tom Johnson | D | 64 | 3 | 10 | 13 | 75 |
| Donnie Marshall | LW | 66 | 4 | 1 | 5 | 10 |
| Bob Turner | D | 33 | 1 | 4 | 5 | 35 |
| Dick Gamble | LW | 12 | 0 | 3 | 3 | 8 |
| Emile Bouchard | D | 36 | 0 | 0 | 0 | 22 |
| Connie Broden | C | 3 | 0 | 0 | 0 | 2 |
| Wally Clune | D | 5 | 0 | 0 | 0 | 6 |
| Jacques Deslauriers | D | 2 | 0 | 0 | 0 | 0 |
| Bob Perreault | G | 6 | 0 | 0 | 0 | 0 |
| Jacques Plante | G | 64 | 0 | 0 | 0 | 10 |

==== Goaltending ====
| Player | MIN | GP | W | L | T | GA | GAA | SO |
|---|---|---|---|---|---|---|---|---|
| Jacques Plante | 3840 | 64 | 42 | 12 | 10 | 119 | 1.86 | 7 |
| Bob Perreault | 360 | 6 | 3 | 3 | 0 | 12 | 2.00 | 1 |
| Team: | 4200 | 70 | 45 | 15 | 10 | 131 | 1.87 | 8 |

=== Playoffs ===
==== Scoring ====
| Player | Pos | GP | G | A | Pts | PIM |
|---|---|---|---|---|---|---|
| Jean Beliveau | C | 10 | 12 | 7 | 19 | 22 |
| Bernie Geoffrion | RW | 10 | 5 | 9 | 14 | 6 |
| Maurice Richard | RW | 10 | 5 | 9 | 14 | 24 |
| Bert Olmstead | LW | 10 | 4 | 10 | 14 | 8 |
| Dickie Moore | LW | 10 | 3 | 6 | 9 | 12 |
| Henri Richard | C | 10 | 4 | 4 | 8 | 21 |
| Doug Harvey | D | 10 | 2 | 5 | 7 | 10 |
| Claude Provost | RW | 10 | 3 | 3 | 6 | 12 |
| Floyd Curry | RW | 10 | 1 | 5 | 6 | 12 |
| Jack LeClair | C | 8 | 1 | 1 | 2 | 4 |
| Ken Mosdell | C | 9 | 1 | 1 | 2 | 2 |
| Tom Johnson | D | 10 | 0 | 2 | 2 | 8 |
| Jean-Guy Talbot | D | 9 | 0 | 2 | 2 | 4 |
| Donnie Marshall | LW | 10 | 1 | 0 | 1 | 0 |
| Bob Turner | D | 10 | 0 | 1 | 1 | 10 |
| Emile Bouchard | D | 1 | 0 | 0 | 0 | 0 |
| Jacques Plante | G | 10 | 0 | 0 | 0 | 2 |
| Dollard St. Laurent | D | 4 | 0 | 0 | 0 | 2 |

==== Goaltending ====
| Player | MIN | GP | W | L | GA | GAA | SO |
|---|---|---|---|---|---|---|---|
| Jacques Plante | 600 | 10 | 8 | 2 | 18 | 1.80 | 2 |
| Team: | 600 | 10 | 8 | 2 | 18 | 1.80 | 2 |

Note:

Pos = Position;GP = Games played; G = Goals; A = Assists; Pts = Points; PIM = Penalty minutes; +/- = Plus/minus; PPG = Power-play goals; SHG = Short-handed goals; GWG = Game-winning goals
Pos = Position;GP = Games played; Min, TOI = Minutes played; W = Wins; L = Losses; T,T/OT = Ties; OTL = Overtime losses; GA = Goals-against; GAA = Goals-against average; SO = Shutouts; SA = Shots against; SV = Shots saved;SV% = Save percentage;

== Awards and records ==
- Prince of Wales Trophy: Montreal Canadiens
- Art Ross Trophy: Jean Beliveau
- Hart Memorial Trophy: Jean Beliveau
- James Norris Memorial Trophy: Doug Harvey
- Vezina Trophy: Jacques Plante, Montreal Canadiens
- Jean Beliveau, Centre, NHL First Team All-Star
- Doug Harvey, Defenceman, NHL First Team All-Star
- Tom Johnson, Defenceman, NHL Second Team All-Star
- Bert Olmstead, Left Wing, NHL Second Team All-Star
- Jacques Plante, Goaltender, NHL First Team All-Star
- Maurice Richard, Right Wing, NHL First Team All-Star

== See also ==
- 1955–56 NHL season
