= 1955–56 New York Rangers season =

NHL hockey team season

1955–56 New York Rangers
- League: 3rd NHL
- 1955–56 record: 32–28–10
- Home record: 20–7–8
- Road record: 12–21–2
- Goals for: 136
- Goals against: 143

Team information
- General manager: Muzz Patrick
- Coach: Phil Watson
- Captain: Harry Howell
- Arena: Madison Square Garden

Team leaders
- Goals: Andy Hebenton; Dean Prentice (24)
- Assists: Andy Bathgate (47)
- Points: Andy Bathgate (66)
- Penalty minutes: Lou Fontinato (202)
- Wins: Gump Worsley (32)
- Goals against average: Gump Worsley (2.84)

The 1955–56 New York Rangers season was the franchise's 30th season. In the regular season, the Rangers finished third overall in the league with a 32–28–10 record. New York qualified for the Stanley Cup playoffs, where they lost to the Montreal Canadiens 4–1 in a best of seven games series.

== Regular season ==
=== Final standings ===
National Hockey League
		GP	W	L	T	GF	GA	DIFF	Pts
1	Montreal Canadiens	70	45	15	10	222	131	+91	100
2	Detroit Red Wings	70	30	24	16	183	148	+35	76
3	New York Rangers	70	32	28	10	204	203	+1	74
4	Toronto Maple Leafs	70	24	33	13	153	181	−28	61
5	Boston Bruins	70	23	34	13	147	185	−38	59
6	Chicago Black Hawks	70	19	39	12	155	216	−61	50

=== Record vs. opponents ===
1955–56 NHL Records
Team	BOS	CHI	DET	MTL	NYR	TOR
Boston	—	3–8–3	3–8–3	5–8–1	7–5–2	5–5–4
Chicago	8–3–3	—	2–8–4	1–12–1	3–10–1	5–6–3
Detroit	8–3–3	8–2–4	—	4–8–2	5–6–3	5–5–4
Montreal	8–5–1	12–1–1	8–4–2	—	8–2–4	9–3–2
New York	5–7–2	10–3–1	6–5–3	2–8–4	—	9–5
Toronto	5–5–4	6–5–3	5–5–4	3–9–2	5–9	—

== Schedule and results ==
1955–56 regular season
October: 5–4–0 (home: 3–1–0; road: 2–3–0)

Game	October	Opponent	Score	Record
1	7	@ Chicago Black Hawks	7–4	1–0–0
2	9	@ Detroit Red Wings	3–2	2–0–0
3	15	@ Montreal Canadiens	4–1	2–1–0
4	16	@ Boston Bruins	4–1	2–2–0
5	19	Toronto Maple Leafs	6–2	3–2–0
6	22	@ Toronto Maple Leafs	3–2	3–3–0
7	23	Chicago Black Hawks	5–4	4–3–0
8	26	Detroit Red Wings	6–2	5–3–0
9	29	Boston Bruins	1–0	5–4–0

November: 6–2–5 (home: 3–0–4; road: 3–2–1)

Game	November	Opponent	Score	Record
10	3	@ Detroit Red Wings	1–1	5–4–1
11	5	@ Toronto Maple Leafs	3–0	6–4–1
12	6	@ Chicago Black Hawks	4–2	7–4–1
13	9	Montreal Canadiens	1–1	7–4–2
14	10	@ Boston Bruins	5–1	7–5–2
15	13	Toronto Maple Leafs	4–1	8–5–2
16	16	Detroit Red Wings	3–3	8–5–3
17	19	@ Montreal Canadiens	6–1	8–6–3
18	20	Montreal Canadiens	1–1	8–6–4
19	23	Boston Bruins	4–0	9–6–4
20	24	@ Boston Bruins	5–0	10–6–4
21	27	Montreal Canadiens	3–3	10–6–5
22	30	Chicago Black Hawks	6–1	11–6–5

December: 6–5–1 (home: 5–2–1; road: 1–3–0)

Game	December	Opponent	Score	Record
23	2	@ Chicago Black Hawks	2–1	12–6–5
24	4	Detroit Red Wings	7–3	13–6–5
25	7	Toronto Maple Leafs	3–1	14–6–5
26	10	@ Toronto Maple Leafs	6–1	14–7–5
27	11	@ Detroit Red Wings	2–0	14–8–5
28	14	Chicago Black Hawks	4–1	14–9–5
29	15	@ Montreal Canadiens	2–0	14–10–5
30	18	Toronto Maple Leafs	4–1	15–10–5
31	21	Boston Bruins	3–3	15–10–6
32	25	Montreal Canadiens	5–1	16–10–6
33	29	Chicago Black Hawks	4–2	16–11–6
34	31	Boston Bruins	6–2	17–11–6

January: 7–5–1 (home: 2–1–0; road: 5–4–1)

Game	January	Opponent	Score	Record
35	1	@ Boston Bruins	4–2	18–11–6
36	4	Detroit Red Wings	5–4	19–11–6
37	8	Chicago Black Hawks	5–3	19–12–6
38	11	Montreal Canadiens	6–1	20–12–6
39	12	@ Detroit Red Wings	6–0	20–13–6
40	14	@ Toronto Maple Leafs	6–5	21–13–6
41	15	@ Chicago Black Hawks	2–0	22–13–6
42	17	@ Chicago Black Hawks	2–2	22–13–7
43	21	@ Montreal Canadiens	3–1	22–14–7
44	22	@ Boston Bruins	3–1	22–15–7
45	26	@ Detroit Red Wings	3–2	22–16–7
46	28	@ Toronto Maple Leafs	3–1	23–16–7
47	29	@ Chicago Black Hawks	6–2	24–16–7

February: 5–8–2 (home: 5–2–2; road: 0–6–0)

Game	February	Opponent	Score	Record
48	1	Toronto Maple Leafs	5–2	25–16–7
49	4	@ Boston Bruins	7–1	25–17–7
50	5	Montreal Canadiens	3–3	25–17–8
51	8	Boston Bruins	3–3	25–17–9
52	11	@ Toronto Maple Leafs	5–0	25–18–9
53	12	Detroit Red Wings	2–1	26–18–9
54	14	@ Detroit Red Wings	5–3	26–19–9
55	15	Chicago Black Hawks	6–1	27–19–9
56	18	@ Montreal Canadiens	9–4	27–20–9
57	19	Boston Bruins	3–0	27–21–9
58	22	Toronto Maple Leafs	4–2	27–22–9
59	23	@ Montreal Canadiens	5–2	27–23–9
60	26	Detroit Red Wings	3–2	28–23–9
61	28	@ Detroit Red Wings	4–1	28–24–9
62	29	Boston Bruins	4–2	29–24–9

March: 3–4–1 (home: 2–1–1; road: 1–3–0)

Game	March	Opponent	Score	Record
63	3	@ Boston Bruins	5–2	29–25–9
64	4	Chicago Black Hawks	3–2	30–25–9
65	8	@ Chicago Black Hawks	6–4	31–25–9
66	10	@ Toronto Maple Leafs	5–2	31–26–9
67	11	Toronto Maple Leafs	4–2	32–26–9
68	15	Detroit Red Wings	2–2	32–26–10
69	17	@ Montreal Canadiens	7–2	32–27–10
70	18	Montreal Canadiens	3–1	32–28–10

Legend: Win (2 points) Loss (0 points) Tie (1 point)

== Playoffs ==
1956 Stanley Cup playoffs
Semifinals vs. (1) Montreal Canadiens – Canadiens win 4–1

Game	Date	Visitor	Score	Home	OT	Series
1	March 20	New York Rangers	1–7	Montreal Canadiens		Montreal leads series 1–0
2	March 22	New York Rangers	4–2	Montreal Canadiens		Series tied 1–1
3	March 24	Montreal Canadiens	3–1	New York Rangers		Montreal leads series 2–1
4	March 25	Montreal Canadiens	5–3	New York Rangers		Montreal leads series 3–1
5	March 27	New York Rangers	0–7	Montreal Canadiens		Montreal wins series 4–1

Legend: Win Loss

== Player statistics ==
Skaters

Regular season
Player	GP	G	A	Pts	PIM
Andy Bathgate	70	19	47	66	59
Dave Creighton	70	20	31	51	43
Bill Gadsby	70	9	42	51	84
Danny Lewicki	70	18	27	45	26
Ron Murphy	66	16	28	44	71
Dean Prentice	70	24	18	42	44
Wally Hergesheimer	70	22	18	40	26
Larry Popein	64	14	25	39	37
Andy Hebenton	70	24	14	38	8
Bronco Horvath	66	12	17	29	40
Pete Conacher	41	11	11	22	10
Harry Howell	70	3	15	18	77
Lou Fontinato	70	3	15	18	202
Don Raleigh	29	1	12	13	4
Jean-Guy Gendron	63	5	7	12	38
Jack Evans	70	2	9	11	104
Aldo Guidolin	14	1	0	1	8
Jim Bartlett	12	0	1	1	8
Ivan Irwin	34	0	1	1	20
Ron Howell	1	0	0	0	0

Playoffs
Player	GP	G	A	Pts	PIM
Bill Gadsby	5	1	3	4	4
Jean-Guy Gendron	5	2	1	3	2
Bronco Horvath	5	1	2	3	4
Danny Lewicki	5	0	3	3	0
Andy Bathgate	5	1	2	3	2
Jack Evans	5	1	0	1	18
Harry Howell	5	0	1	1	4
Andy Hebenton	5	1	0	1	2
Larry Popein	5	0	1	1	2
Wally Hergesheimer	5	1	0	1	0
Dean Prentice	5	1	0	1	2
Ron Murphy	5	0	1	1	2
Ivan Irwin	5	0	0	0	8
Lou Fontinato	4	0	0	0	6
Pete Conacher	5	0	0	0	0
Dave Creighton	5	0	0	0	4

Goaltenders

Regular season
Player	GP	TOI	W	L	T	GA	GAA	SA	SV%	SO
Lorne Worsley	70	4200	32	28	10	199	2.84	2542	.922	4

Playoffs
Player	GP	TOI	W	L	GA	GAA	SO
Lorne Worsley	3	180	0	3	14	4.67	0
Gordon Bell	2	120	1	1	9	4.50	0

^{†}Denotes player spent time with another team before joining Rangers. Stats reflect time with Rangers only.
^{‡}Traded mid-season. Stats reflect time with Rangers only.

Note:

Pos = Position;GP = Games played; G = Goals; A = Assists; Pts = Points; PIM = Penalty minutes; +/- = Plus/minus; PPG = Power-play goals; SHG = Short-handed goals; GWG = Game-winning goals
Pos = Position;GP = Games played; Min, TOI = Minutes played; W = Wins; L = Losses; T,T/OT = Ties; OTL = Overtime losses; GA = Goals-against; GAA = Goals-against average; SO = Shutouts; SA = Shots against; SV = Shots saved;SV% = Save percentage;

== See also ==
- 1955–56 NHL season
