= 1955–56 Boston Bruins season =

NHL team season

1955–56 Boston Bruins
- League: 5th NHL
- 1955–56 record: 23–34–13
- Home record: 14–14–7
- Road record: 9–20–6
- Goals for: 147
- Goals against: 185

Team information
- General manager: Lynn Patrick
- Coach: Milt Schmidt
- Captain: Fernie Flaman
- Arena: Boston Garden

Team leaders
- Goals: Vic Stasiuk (19)
- Assists: Cal Gardner (21)
- Points: Vic Stasiuk (37)
- Penalty minutes: Bob Armstrong (122)
- Wins: Terry Sawchuk (22)
- Goals against average: Terry Sawchuk (2.60)

The 1955–56 Boston Bruins season was the Bruins' 32nd season in the NHL the Bruins missed the playoffs for the first time since the 1949–50 season.

== Regular season ==
=== Final standings ===
National Hockey League
		GP	W	L	T	GF	GA	DIFF	Pts
1	Montreal Canadiens	70	45	15	10	222	131	+91	100
2	Detroit Red Wings	70	30	24	16	183	148	+35	76
3	New York Rangers	70	32	28	10	204	203	+1	74
4	Toronto Maple Leafs	70	24	33	13	153	181	−28	61
5	Boston Bruins	70	23	34	13	147	185	−38	59
6	Chicago Black Hawks	70	19	39	12	155	216	−61	50

=== Record vs. opponents ===
1955–56 NHL Records
Team	BOS	CHI	DET	MTL	NYR	TOR
Boston	—	3–8–3	3–8–3	5–8–1	7–5–2	5–5–4
Chicago	8–3–3	—	2–8–4	1–12–1	3–10–1	5–6–3
Detroit	8–3–3	8–2–4	—	4–8–2	5–6–3	5–5–4
Montreal	8–5–1	12–1–1	8–4–2	—	8–2–4	9–3–2
New York	5–7–2	10–3–1	6–5–3	2–8–4	—	9–5
Toronto	5–5–4	6–5–3	5–5–4	3–9–2	5–9	—

== Schedule and results ==
1955–56 regular season
October

Game	Result	Date	Score	Opponent	Record
1	L	October 8, 1955	0–2	@ Montreal Canadiens (1955–56)	0–1–0
2	L	October 9, 1955	2–5	Montreal Canadiens (1955–56)	0–2–0
3	W	October 12, 1955	2–0	Toronto Maple Leafs (1955–56)	1–2–0
4	T	October 15, 1955	2–2	@ Toronto Maple Leafs (1955–56)	1–2–1
5	W	October 16, 1955	4–1	New York Rangers (1955–56)	2–2–1
6	W	October 20, 1955	3–2	@ Montreal Canadiens (1955–56)	3–2–1
7	T	October 22, 1955	0–0	@ Detroit Red Wings (1955–56)	3–2–2
8	L	October 25, 1955	0–2	@ Chicago Black Hawks (1955–56)	3–3–2
9	W	October 29, 1955	1–0	@ New York Rangers (1955–56)	4–3–2

November

Game	Result	Date	Score	Opponent	Record
10	T	November 3, 1955	3–3	Chicago Black Hawks (1955–56)	4–3–3
11	L	November 5, 1955	2–4	@ Montreal Canadiens (1955–56)	4–4–3
12	T	November 6, 1955	3–3	Montreal Canadiens (1955–56)	4–4–4
13	W	November 10, 1955	5–1	New York Rangers (1955–56)	5–4–4
14	W	November 12, 1955	3–2	@ Toronto Maple Leafs (1955–56)	6–4–4
15	T	November 13, 1955	0–0	Detroit Red Wings (1955–56)	6–4–5
16	L	November 18, 1955	1–6	@ Chicago Black Hawks (1955–56)	6–5–5
17	L	November 19, 1955	2–3	@ Toronto Maple Leafs (1955–56)	6–6–5
18	T	November 20, 1955	1–1	Toronto Maple Leafs (1955–56)	6–6–6
19	L	November 23, 1955	0–4	@ New York Rangers (1955–56)	6–7–6
20	L	November 24, 1955	0–5	New York Rangers (1955–56)	6–8–6
21	L	November 26, 1955	1–3	@ Montreal Canadiens (1955–56)	6–9–6
22	L	November 27, 1955	0–6	Chicago Black Hawks (1955–56)	6–10–6

December

Game	Result	Date	Score	Opponent	Record
23	L	December 1, 1955	1–2	Montreal Canadiens (1955–56)	6–11–6
24	L	December 3, 1955	0–5	Detroit Red Wings (1955–56)	6–12–6
25	W	December 4, 1955	5–0	Toronto Maple Leafs (1955–56)	7–12–6
26	T	December 8, 1955	2–2	@ Detroit Red Wings (1955–56)	7–12–7
27	T	December 9, 1955	1–1	@ Chicago Black Hawks (1955–56)	7–12–8
28	L	December 11, 1955	2–4	Montreal Canadiens (1955–56)	7–13–8
29	W	December 15, 1955	4–1	Chicago Black Hawks (1955–56)	8–13–8
30	L	December 17, 1955	1–5	@ Toronto Maple Leafs (1955–56)	8–14–8
31	L	December 18, 1955	1–7	@ Chicago Black Hawks (1955–56)	8–15–8
32	T	December 21, 1955	3–3	@ New York Rangers (1955–56)	8–15–9
33	L	December 22, 1955	2–3	Detroit Red Wings (1955–56)	8–16–9
34	L	December 25, 1955	2–4	Chicago Black Hawks (1955–56)	8–17–9
35	L	December 29, 1955	3–4	@ Detroit Red Wings (1955–56)	8–18–9
36	L	December 31, 1955	2–6	@ New York Rangers (1955–56)	8–19–9

January

Game	Result	Date	Score	Opponent	Record
37	L	January 1, 1956	2–4	New York Rangers (1955–56)	8–20–9
38	L	January 7, 1956	2–6	@ Toronto Maple Leafs (1955–56)	8–21–9
39	L	January 8, 1956	3–4	@ Detroit Red Wings (1955–56)	8–22–9
40	L	January 12, 1956	0–5	Chicago Black Hawks (1955–56)	8–23–9
41	W	January 14, 1956	2–0	@ Montreal Canadiens (1955–56)	9–23–9
42	L	January 15, 1956	1–4	Toronto Maple Leafs (1955–56)	9–24–9
43	L	January 19, 1956	2–4	@ Detroit Red Wings (1955–56)	9–25–9
44	W	January 20, 1956	3–0	@ Chicago Black Hawks (1955–56)	10–25–9
45	W	January 22, 1956	3–1	New York Rangers (1955–56)	11–25–9
46	W	January 26, 1956	5–1	Montreal Canadiens (1955–56)	12–25–9
47	L	January 28, 1956	1–6	@ Montreal Canadiens (1955–56)	12–26–9
48	W	January 29, 1956	3–1	Toronto Maple Leafs (1955–56)	13–26–9

February

Game	Result	Date	Score	Opponent	Record
49	T	February 2, 1956	2–2	Chicago Black Hawks (1955–56)	13–26–10
50	W	February 4, 1956	7–1	New York Rangers (1955–56)	14–26–10
51	W	February 5, 1956	3–1	Detroit Red Wings (1955–56)	15–26–10
52	T	February 8, 1956	3–3	@ New York Rangers (1955–56)	15–26–11
53	T	February 9, 1956	1–1	Toronto Maple Leafs (1955–56)	15–26–12
54	W	February 11, 1956	3–2	Detroit Red Wings (1955–56)	16–26–12
55	L	February 12, 1956	1–7	Montreal Canadiens (1955–56)	16–27–12
56	L	February 15, 1956	0–1	@ Toronto Maple Leafs (1955–56)	16–28–12
57	W	February 17, 1956	4–2	@ Chicago Black Hawks (1955–56)	17–28–12
58	W	February 19, 1956	3–0	@ New York Rangers (1955–56)	18–28–12
59	L	February 21, 1956	1–4	@ Detroit Red Wings (1955–56)	18–29–12
60	W	February 25, 1956	3–1	@ Toronto Maple Leafs (1955–56)	19–29–12
61	L	February 26, 1956	1–4	@ Chicago Black Hawks (1955–56)	19–30–12
62	L	February 29, 1956	2–4	@ New York Rangers (1955–56)	19–31–12

March

Game	Result	Date	Score	Opponent	Record
63	L	March 1, 1956	0–2	Detroit Red Wings (1955–56)	19–32–12
64	W	March 3, 1956	5–2	New York Rangers (1955–56)	20–32–12
65	T	March 4, 1956	2–2	Toronto Maple Leafs (1955–56)	20–32–13
66	L	March 8, 1956	2–4	@ Detroit Red Wings (1955–56)	20–33–13
67	W	March 10, 1956	4–0	@ Montreal Canadiens (1955–56)	21–33–13
68	W	March 11, 1956	3–1	Montreal Canadiens (1955–56)	22–33–13
69	W	March 13, 1956	4–0	Detroit Red Wings (1955–56)	23–33–13
70	L	March 18, 1956	2–3	Chicago Black Hawks (1955–56)	23–34–13

Legend: Win (2 points) Loss (0 points) Tie (1 point)

== Playoffs ==
The Bruins failed to make the playoffs – leading to a moment of NHL history.

As was then customary for the Bruins when missing the playoffs, the team played an exhibition tour. This resulted in the first ever outdoor game in Canada involving an NHL team, the 1956 Boston Bruins exhibition game in Newfoundland, on the night of April 9, 1956.

== Player statistics ==
=== Regular season ===
Scoring

Player	Pos	GP	G	A	Pts	PIM
Vic Stasiuk	LW	59	19	18	37	118
Cal Gardner	C	70	15	21	36	57
Leo Labine	RW	68	16	18	34	104
Don McKenney	C	65	10	24	34	20
Johnny Peirson	RW	33	11	14	25	10
Bill Quackenbush	D	70	3	22	25	4
Fern Flaman	D	62	4	17	21	70
Leo Boivin	D	68	4	16	20	80
Real Chevrefils	LW	25	11	8	19	10
Doug Mohns	LW/D	64	10	8	18	48
Marcel Bonin	W	67	9	9	18	49
Fleming MacKell	C	52	7	9	16	59
Jerry Toppazzini	RW	28	7	7	14	22
Lorne Ferguson	LW	32	7	5	12	18
Murray Costello	C	41	6	6	12	19
Bob Armstrong	D	68	0	12	12	122
Hal Laycoe	D	65	5	5	10	16
Orval Tessier	C	23	2	3	5	6
Ed Panagabko	C	28	0	3	3	38
Lionel Heinrich	LW	35	1	1	2	33
Lorne Davis	RW	15	0	1	1	0
John Henderson	G	1	0	0	0	0
Al Nicholson	LW	14	0	0	0	4
Ellard O'Brien	D	2	0	0	0	0
Claude Pronovost	G	1	0	0	0	2
Terry Sawchuk	G	68	0	0	0	20

Goaltending

Player	MIN	GP	W	L	T	GA	GAA	SO
Terry Sawchuk	4080	68	22	33	13	177	2.60	9
Claude Pronovost	60	1	1	0	0	0	0.00	1
John Henderson	60	1	0	1	0	4	4.00	0
Team:	4200	70	23	34	13	181	2.59	10

Note:

Pos = Position;GP = Games played; G = Goals; A = Assists; Pts = Points; PIM = Penalty minutes; +/- = Plus/minus; PPG = Power-play goals; SHG = Short-handed goals; GWG = Game-winning goals
Pos = Position;GP = Games played; Min, TOI = Minutes played; W = Wins; L = Losses; T,T/OT = Ties; OTL = Overtime losses; GA = Goals-against; GAA = Goals-against average; SO = Shutouts; SA = Shots against; SV = Shots saved;SV% = Save percentage;

== See also ==
- 1955–56 NHL season
