= 1955–56 Chicago Black Hawks season =

NHL ice hockey team season

1955–56 Chicago Black Hawks
- League: 6th NHL
- 1955–56 record: 19–39–12
- Home record: 9–19–7
- Road record: 10–20–5
- Goals for: 155
- Goals against: 216

Team information
- General manager: Tommy Ivan
- Coach: Dick Irvin
- Captain: Gus Mortson
- Arena: Chicago Stadium

Team leaders
- Goals: Johnny Wilson (24)
- Assists: Ed Litzenberger (29)
- Points: Red Sullivan (40)
- Penalty minutes: Lee Fogolin Sr. (88)
- Wins: Al Rollins (17)
- Goals against average: Al Rollins (2.95)

The 1955–56 Chicago Black Hawks season was the team's 30th season in the NHL, and the club was coming off their second straight last place finish in 1954–55, when they had a record of 13–40–17, earning 43 points. The struggling franchise had finished in the NHL cellar for seven times in the past nine seasons.

The Black Hawks would not bring back head coach Frank Eddolls, as they hired Dick Irvin, who had previously coached the Black Hawks in 1928–29 and 1930–31. After leaving Chicago in 1931, Irvin would coach the Toronto Maple Leafs from 1931 to 1940, winning the 1932 Stanley Cup, then he went on to coach the Montreal Canadiens from 1940 to 1955, winning three Stanley Cups with the team in 1944, 1946 and 1953. Also, in the off-season, the Hawks acquired Johnny Wilson and Glen Skov from the Detroit Red Wings.

The team would get off to their best start in a few seasons, as they played .500 hockey in their opening 10 games, as Chicago had a record of 4–4–2. The team would hover around the .500 mark through the first 23 games before falling into a slump, in which they would go 11–30–6 in their remaining 47 games to finish the season in last place for the eighth time in ten seasons. Despite the last place finish, Chicago improved their win total to 19 games and their point total to 50, which represented their highest totals since the 1952–53 season.

Offensively, Chicago was led by Red Sullivan, who had a team high 40 points, as he scored 14 goals and added 26 assists. Newly acquired Johnny Wilson scored a team high 24 goals, becoming the first Black Hawk since 1953 to score over 20 goals, while Ed Litzenberger had a club best 29 assists, en route to a 39-point season. Allan Stanley led the defense with 14 assists and 18 points, while fellow blueliner Jack McIntyre scored a defense leading 10 goals, while adding 5 assists for 15 points. Team captain Gus Mortson also had 15 points from the blueline, along with 87 penalty minutes. Lee Fogolin Sr. led the team in that category though, accumulating 88 penalty minutes.

In goal, Al Rollins played the majority of games, leading the team in wins at 17, and GAA at 2.95. He also earned 3 shutouts.

== Season standings ==
National Hockey League
		GP	W	L	T	GF	GA	DIFF	Pts
1	Montreal Canadiens	70	45	15	10	222	131	+91	100
2	Detroit Red Wings	70	30	24	16	183	148	+35	76
3	New York Rangers	70	32	28	10	204	203	+1	74
4	Toronto Maple Leafs	70	24	33	13	153	181	−28	61
5	Boston Bruins	70	23	34	13	147	185	−38	59
6	Chicago Black Hawks	70	19	39	12	155	216	−61	50

=== Record vs. opponents ===
1955–56 NHL Records
Team	BOS	CHI	DET	MTL	NYR	TOR
Boston	—	3–8–3	3–8–3	5–8–1	7–5–2	5–5–4
Chicago	8–3–3	—	2–8–4	1–12–1	3–10–1	5–6–3
Detroit	8–3–3	8–2–4	—	4–8–2	5–6–3	5–5–4
Montreal	8–5–1	12–1–1	8–4–2	—	8–2–4	9–3–2
New York	5–7–2	10–3–1	6–5–3	2–8–4	—	9–5
Toronto	5–5–4	6–5–3	5–5–4	3–9–2	5–9	—

== Schedule and results ==
1955–56 regular season
October

Game	Date	Visitor	Score	Home	Record	Points
1	October 6	Chicago Black Hawks	3–2	Detroit Red Wings	1–0–0	2
2	October 7	New York Rangers	7–4	Chicago Black Hawks	1–1–0	2
3	October 9	Toronto Maple Leafs	1–3	Chicago Black Hawks	2–1–0	4
4	October 15	Detroit Red Wings	4–1	Chicago Black Hawks	2–2–0	4
5	October 16	Montreal Canadiens	2–2	Chicago Black Hawks	2–2–1	5
6	October 20	Chicago Black Hawks	2–2	Detroit Red Wings	2–2–2	6
7	October 22	Chicago Black Hawks	0–6	Montreal Canadiens	2–3–2	6
8	October 23	Chicago Black Hawks	4–5	New York Rangers	2–4–2	6
9	October 25	Boston Bruins	0–2	Chicago Black Hawks	3–4–2	8
10	October 27	Chicago Black Hawks	4–1	Montreal Canadiens	4–4–2	10
11	October 29	Chicago Black Hawks	0–2	Toronto Maple Leafs	4–5–2	10

November

Game	Date	Visitor	Score	Home	Record	Points
12	November 3	Chicago Black Hawks	3–3	Boston Bruins	4–5–3	11
13	November 5	Detroit Red Wings	3–3	Chicago Black Hawks	4–5–4	12
14	November 6	New York Rangers	4–2	Chicago Black Hawks	4–6–4	12
15	November 10	Chicago Black Hawks	2–2	Detroit Red Wings	4–6–5	13
16	November 11	Toronto Maple Leafs	0–2	Chicago Black Hawks	5–6–5	15
17	November 13	Montreal Canadiens	2–0	Chicago Black Hawks	5–7–5	15
18	November 18	Boston Bruins	1–6	Chicago Black Hawks	6–7–5	17
19	November 19	Chicago Black Hawks	1–4	Detroit Red Wings	6–8–5	17
20	November 20	Detroit Red Wings	1–1	Chicago Black Hawks	6–8–6	18
21	November 24	Toronto Maple Leafs	2–3	Chicago Black Hawks	7–8–6	20
22	November 26	Chicago Black Hawks	4–7	Toronto Maple Leafs	7–9–6	20
23	November 27	Chicago Black Hawks	6–0	Boston Bruins	8–9–6	22
24	November 30	Chicago Black Hawks	1–6	New York Rangers	8–10–6	22

December

Game	Date	Visitor	Score	Home	Record	Points
25	December 2	New York Rangers	2–1	Chicago Black Hawks	8–11–6	22
26	December 4	Montreal Canadiens	5–1	Chicago Black Hawks	8–12–6	22
27	December 9	Boston Bruins	1–1	Chicago Black Hawks	8–12–7	23
28	December 11	Toronto Maple Leafs	3–3	Chicago Black Hawks	8–12–8	24
29	December 14	Chicago Black Hawks	4–1	New York Rangers	9–12–8	26
30	December 15	Chicago Black Hawks	1–4	Boston Bruins	9–13–8	26
31	December 17	Chicago Black Hawks	0–5	Montreal Canadiens	9–14–8	26
32	December 18	Boston Bruins	1–7	Chicago Black Hawks	10–14–8	28
33	December 20	Montreal Canadiens	7–1	Chicago Black Hawks	10–15–8	28
34	December 24	Chicago Black Hawks	2–5	Toronto Maple Leafs	10–16–8	28
35	December 25	Chicago Black Hawks	4–2	Boston Bruins	11–16–8	30
36	December 29	Chicago Black Hawks	4–2	New York Rangers	12–16–8	32
37	December 31	Chicago Black Hawks	3–7	Montreal Canadiens	12–17–8	32

January

Game	Date	Visitor	Score	Home	Record	Points
38	January 1	Chicago Black Hawks	1–5	Detroit Red Wings	12–18–8	32
39	January 4	Chicago Black Hawks	2–4	Toronto Maple Leafs	12–19–8	32
40	January 7	Chicago Black Hawks	1–3	Montreal Canadiens	12–20–8	32
41	January 8	Chicago Black Hawks	5–3	New York Rangers	13–20–8	34
42	January 12	Chicago Black Hawks	5–0	Boston Bruins	14–20–8	36
43	January 14	Detroit Red Wings	3–1	Chicago Black Hawks	14–21–8	36
44	January 15	New York Rangers	2–0	Chicago Black Hawks	14–22–8	36
45	January 17	New York Rangers	2–2	Chicago Black Hawks	14–22–9	37
46	January 20	Boston Bruins	3–0	Chicago Black Hawks	14–23–9	37
47	January 22	Montreal Canadiens	6–2	Chicago Black Hawks	14–24–9	37
48	January 25	Chicago Black Hawks	1–3	Toronto Maple Leafs	14–25–9	37
49	January 27	Detroit Red Wings	7–0	Chicago Black Hawks	14–26–9	37
50	January 29	New York Rangers	6–2	Chicago Black Hawks	14–27–9	37

February

Game	Date	Visitor	Score	Home	Record	Points
51	February 2	Chicago Black Hawks	2–2	Boston Bruins	14–27–10	38
52	February 4	Chicago Black Hawks	4–2	Toronto Maple Leafs	15–27–10	40
53	February 5	Toronto Maple Leafs	2–3	Chicago Black Hawks	16–27–10	42
54	February 7	Chicago Black Hawks	2–3	Detroit Red Wings	16–28–10	42
55	February 10	Montreal Canadiens	3–1	Chicago Black Hawks	16–29–10	42
56	February 12	Toronto Maple Leafs	1–1	Chicago Black Hawks	16–29–11	43
57	February 15	Chicago Black Hawks	1–6	New York Rangers	16–30–11	43
58	February 17	Boston Bruins	4–2	Chicago Black Hawks	16–31–11	43
59	February 19	Detroit Red Wings	3–5	Chicago Black Hawks	17–31–11	45
60	February 24	Toronto Maple Leafs	2–1	Chicago Black Hawks	17–32–11	45
61	February 26	Boston Bruins	1–4	Chicago Black Hawks	18–32–11	47

March

Game	Date	Visitor	Score	Home	Record	Points
62	March 2	Montreal Canadiens	3–1	Chicago Black Hawks	18–33–11	47
63	March 3	Chicago Black Hawks	1–3	Montreal Canadiens	18–34–11	47
64	March 4	Chicago Black Hawks	2–3	New York Rangers	18–35–11	47
65	March 8	New York Rangers	6–4	Chicago Black Hawks	18–36–11	47
66	March 10	Chicago Black Hawks	0–2	Detroit Red Wings	18–37–11	47
67	March 11	Detroit Red Wings	3–2	Chicago Black Hawks	18–38–11	47
68	March 15	Chicago Black Hawks	2–5	Montreal Canadiens	18–39–11	47
69	March 17	Chicago Black Hawks	1–1	Toronto Maple Leafs	18–39–12	48
70	March 18	Chicago Black Hawks	3–2	Boston Bruins	19–39–12	50

Legend: Win (2 points) Loss (0 points) Tie (1 point)

== Season stats ==
=== Scoring leaders ===
Player	GP	G	A	Pts	PIM
Red Sullivan	63	14	26	40	58
Nick Mickoski	70	19	20	39	52
Ed Litzenberger	70	10	29	39	36
Johnny Wilson	70	24	9	33	12
Hank Ciesla	70	8	23	31	22

=== Goaltending ===
Player	GP	TOI	W	L	T	GA	SO	GAA
Al Rollins	58	3480	17	30	11	171	3	2.95
Hank Bassen	12	720	2	9	1	40	1	3.33

== Sources ==
- Hockey-Reference
- National Hockey League Guide & Record Book 2007
