= Wally Clune =

Canadian ice hockey player

- Born: February 20, 1930 Toronto, Ontario, Canada
- Died: February 3, 1998 (aged 67)
- Height: 5 ft 9 in (175 cm)
- Weight: 150 lb (68 kg; 10 st 10 lb)
- Position: Defence
- Shot: Right
- Played for: Montreal Canadiens
- Playing career: 1950–1961

Walter James Clune (February 20, 1930 – February 3, 1998) was a Canadian professional ice hockey defenceman. He played 5 games in the National Hockey League for the Montreal Canadiens during the 1955–56 season. The rest of his career, which lasted from 1950 to 1961, was spent in the minor leagues. He was born in Toronto, Ontario. He later married Quebec television star and future Member of Parliament, Senator, Andrée Champagne.

== Career statistics ==
=== Regular season and playoffs ===
			Regular season					Playoffs
Season	Team	League	GP	G	A	Pts	PIM	GP	G	A	Pts	PIM
1947–48	St. Michael's Majors	OHA	32	3	5	8	37	—	—	—	—	—
1948–49	St. Michael's Majors	OHA	31	2	3	5	68	—	—	—	—	—
1949–50	Guelph Biltmores	OHA	44	7	10	17	68	15	0	2	2	27
1949–50	Guelph Biltmores	M-Cup	—	—	—	—	—	11	2	4	6	12
1950–51	Boston Olympics	EAHL	50	10	19	29	112	6	0	1	1	16
1950–51	Montreal Royals	QSHL	8	0	0	0	0	—	—	—	—	—
1951–52	Montreal Royals	QSHL	57	3	11	14	84	7	0	2	2	6
1952–53	Montreal Royals	QSHL	43	1	13	14	67	16	0	3	3	21
1953–54	Vancouver Canucks	WHL	64	8	6	14	69	5	1	0	1	2
1954–55	Vancouver Canucks	WHL	69	7	17	24	85	5	0	2	2	8
1955–56	Montreal Canadiens	NHL	5	0	0	0	6	—	—	—	—	—
1955–56	Montreal Royals	QSHL	53	2	9	11	110	13	0	3	3	39
1956–57	Montreal Royals	QSHL	54	1	6	7	105	3	0	0	0	0
1957–58	Montreal Royals	QSHL	56	1	15	16	87	7	1	0	1	30
1958–59	Montreal Royals	QSHL	57	7	25	32	84	8	0	1	1	13
1959–60	Montreal Royals	EPHL	62	2	20	22	63	14	0	5	5	13
1960–61	Montreal Royals	EPHL	65	2	7	9	22	—	—	—	—	—
QSHL totals			328	15	79	94	543	54	1	9	10	109
NHL totals			5	0	0	0	6	—	—	—	—	—
