= 1955–56 Toronto Maple Leafs season =

NHL hockey team season

1955–56 Toronto Maple Leafs
- League: 4th NHL
- 1955–56 record: 24–33–13
- Home record: 19–10–6
- Road record: 5–23–7
- Goals for: 153
- Goals against: 181

Team information
- General manager: Conn Smythe and Hap Day
- Coach: King Clancy
- Captain: Sid Smith
- Arena: Maple Leaf Gardens

Team leaders
- Goals: Tod Sloan (37)
- Assists: George Armstrong (32)
- Points: Tod Sloan (66)
- Penalty minutes: Tod Sloan (100)
- Wins: Harry Lumley (21)
- Goals against average: Harry Lumley (2.67)

The 1955–56 Toronto Maple Leafs season was Toronto's 39th season in the National Hockey League (NHL). The team would make the playoffs for the third year in a row, before losing in the semifinals.

== Regular season ==
=== Final standings ===
National Hockey League
		GP	W	L	T	GF	GA	DIFF	Pts
1	Montreal Canadiens	70	45	15	10	222	131	+91	100
2	Detroit Red Wings	70	30	24	16	183	148	+35	76
3	New York Rangers	70	32	28	10	204	203	+1	74
4	Toronto Maple Leafs	70	24	33	13	153	181	−28	61
5	Boston Bruins	70	23	34	13	147	185	−38	59
6	Chicago Black Hawks	70	19	39	12	155	216	−61	50

=== Record vs. opponents ===
1955–56 NHL Records
Team	BOS	CHI	DET	MTL	NYR	TOR
Boston	—	3–8–3	3–8–3	5–8–1	7–5–2	5–5–4
Chicago	8–3–3	—	2–8–4	1–12–1	3–10–1	5–6–3
Detroit	8–3–3	8–2–4	—	4–8–2	5–6–3	5–5–4
Montreal	8–5–1	12–1–1	8–4–2	—	8–2–4	9–3–2
New York	5–7–2	10–3–1	6–5–3	2–8–4	—	9–5
Toronto	5–5–4	6–5–3	5–5–4	3–9–2	5–9	—

== Schedule and results ==
1955–56 regular season
October

Game	Result	Date	Score	Opponent	Record
1	L	October 6, 1955	0–2	@ Montreal Canadiens (1955–56)	0–1–0
2	W	October 8, 1955	4–2	Detroit Red Wings (1955–56)	1–1–0
3	L	October 9, 1955	1–3	@ Chicago Black Hawks (1955–56)	1–2–0
4	L	October 12, 1955	0–2	@ Boston Bruins (1955–56)	1–3–0
5	T	October 15, 1955	2–2	Boston Bruins (1955–56)	1–3–1
6	L	October 16, 1955	0–6	@ Detroit Red Wings (1955–56)	1–4–1
7	L	October 19, 1955	2–6	@ New York Rangers (1955–56)	1–5–1
8	W	October 22, 1955	3–2	New York Rangers (1955–56)	2–5–1
9	W	October 26, 1955	2–1	Montreal Canadiens (1955–56)	3–5–1
10	W	October 29, 1955	2–0	Chicago Black Hawks (1955–56)	4–5–1

November

Game	Result	Date	Score	Opponent	Record
11	W	November 2, 1955	3–1	Detroit Red Wings (1955–56)	5–5–1
12	T	November 3, 1955	3–3	@ Montreal Canadiens (1955–56)	5–5–2
13	L	November 5, 1955	0–3	New York Rangers (1955–56)	5–6–2
14	L	November 6, 1955	1–4	@ Detroit Red Wings (1955–56)	5–7–2
15	L	November 11, 1955	0–2	@ Chicago Black Hawks (1955–56)	5–8–2
16	L	November 12, 1955	2–3	Boston Bruins (1955–56)	5–9–2
17	L	November 13, 1955	1–4	@ New York Rangers (1955–56)	5–10–2
18	L	November 16, 1955	2–3	Montreal Canadiens (1955–56)	5–11–2
19	W	November 19, 1955	3–2	Boston Bruins (1955–56)	6–11–2
20	T	November 20, 1955	1–1	@ Boston Bruins (1955–56)	6–11–3
21	L	November 24, 1955	2–3	@ Chicago Black Hawks (1955–56)	6–12–3
22	W	November 26, 1955	7–4	Chicago Black Hawks (1955–56)	7–12–3
23	W	November 27, 1955	2–1	@ Detroit Red Wings (1955–56)	8–12–3
24	T	November 30, 1955	3–3	Detroit Red Wings (1955–56)	8–12–4

December

Game	Result	Date	Score	Opponent	Record
25	L	December 3, 1955	1–3	Montreal Canadiens (1955–56)	8–13–4
26	L	December 4, 1955	0–5	@ Boston Bruins (1955–56)	8–14–4
27	L	December 7, 1955	1–3	@ New York Rangers (1955–56)	8–15–4
28	L	December 8, 1955	1–3	@ Montreal Canadiens (1955–56)	8–16–4
29	W	December 10, 1955	6–1	New York Rangers (1955–56)	9–16–4
30	T	December 11, 1955	3–3	@ Chicago Black Hawks (1955–56)	9–16–5
31	L	December 15, 1955	0–4	@ Detroit Red Wings (1955–56)	9–17–5
32	W	December 17, 1955	5–1	Boston Bruins (1955–56)	10–17–5
33	L	December 18, 1955	1–4	@ New York Rangers (1955–56)	10–18–5
34	W	December 24, 1955	5–2	Chicago Black Hawks (1955–56)	11–18–5
35	T	December 25, 1955	1–1	@ Detroit Red Wings (1955–56)	11–18–6
36	W	December 28, 1955	2–0	Montreal Canadiens (1955–56)	12–18–6
37	L	December 29, 1955	2–5	@ Montreal Canadiens (1955–56)	12–19–6
38	T	December 31, 1955	2–2	Detroit Red Wings (1955–56)	12–19–7

January

Game	Result	Date	Score	Opponent	Record
39	W	January 4, 1956	4–2	Chicago Black Hawks (1955–56)	13–19–7
40	W	January 7, 1956	6–2	Boston Bruins (1955–56)	14–19–7
41	L	January 14, 1956	5–6	New York Rangers (1955–56)	14–20–7
42	W	January 15, 1956	4–1	@ Boston Bruins (1955–56)	15–20–7
43	L	January 18, 1956	2–3	Montreal Canadiens (1955–56)	15–21–7
44	L	January 19, 1956	1–3	@ Montreal Canadiens (1955–56)	15–22–7
45	W	January 21, 1956	4–2	Detroit Red Wings (1955–56)	16–22–7
46	L	January 22, 1956	1–4	@ Detroit Red Wings (1955–56)	16–23–7
47	W	January 25, 1956	3–1	Chicago Black Hawks (1955–56)	17–23–7
48	L	January 28, 1956	1–3	New York Rangers (1955–56)	17–24–7
49	L	January 29, 1956	1–3	@ Boston Bruins (1955–56)	17–25–7

February

Game	Result	Date	Score	Opponent	Record
50	L	February 1, 1956	2–5	@ New York Rangers (1955–56)	17–26–7
51	L	February 4, 1956	2–4	Chicago Black Hawks (1955–56)	17–27–7
52	L	February 5, 1956	2–3	@ Chicago Black Hawks (1955–56)	17–28–7
53	T	February 8, 1956	1–1	Montreal Canadiens (1955–56)	17–28–8
54	T	February 9, 1956	1–1	@ Boston Bruins (1955–56)	17–28–9
55	W	February 11, 1956	5–0	New York Rangers (1955–56)	18–28–9
56	T	February 12, 1956	1–1	@ Chicago Black Hawks (1955–56)	18–28–10
57	W	February 15, 1956	1–0	Boston Bruins (1955–56)	19–28–10
58	L	February 16, 1956	1–8	@ Montreal Canadiens (1955–56)	19–29–10
59	L	February 18, 1956	1–6	Detroit Red Wings (1955–56)	19–30–10
60	W	February 22, 1956	4–2	@ New York Rangers (1955–56)	20–30–10
61	W	February 24, 1956	2–1	@ Chicago Black Hawks (1955–56)	21–30–10
62	L	February 25, 1956	1–3	Boston Bruins (1955–56)	21–31–10
63	W	February 29, 1956	4–1	Montreal Canadiens (1955–56)	22–31–10

March

Game	Result	Date	Score	Opponent	Record
64	T	March 3, 1956	2–2	Detroit Red Wings (1955–56)	22–31–11
65	T	March 4, 1956	2–2	@ Boston Bruins (1955–56)	22–31–12
66	L	March 8, 1956	3–4	@ Montreal Canadiens (1955–56)	22–32–12
67	W	March 10, 1956	5–2	New York Rangers (1955–56)	23–32–12
68	L	March 11, 1956	2–4	@ New York Rangers (1955–56)	23–33–12
69	T	March 17, 1956	1–1	Chicago Black Hawks (1955–56)	23–33–13
70	W	March 18, 1956	2–0	@ Detroit Red Wings (1955–56)	24–33–13

Legend: Win (2 points) Loss (0 points) Tie (1 point)

== Player statistics ==
=== Regular season ===
Scoring

Player	GP	G	A	Pts	PIM
Tod Sloan	70	37	29	66	100
George Armstrong	67	16	32	48	97
Dick Duff	69	18	19	37	74
Rudy Migay	70	12	16	28	52
Ron Stewart	69	13	14	27	35
Billy Harris	70	9	13	22	8
Sid Smith	55	4	17	21	8
Hugh Bolton	67	4	16	20	65
Earl Balfour	59	14	5	19	40
Jim Morrison	63	2	17	19	77
Gord Hannigan	48	8	7	15	40
Ron Hurst	50	7	5	12	62
Marc Reaume	48	0	12	12	50
Eric Nesterenko	40	4	6	10	65
Brian Cullen	21	2	6	8	8
Jimmy Thomson	62	0	7	7	96
Gerry James	46	3	3	6	50
Tim Horton	35	0	5	5	36
Larry Cahan	21	0	2	2	46
Jack Bionda	13	0	1	1	18
Bill Burega	4	0	1	1	4
Joe Klukay	18	0	1	1	2
Bob Bailey	6	0	0	0	6
Ed Chadwick	5	0	0	0	0
Barry Cullen	3	0	0	0	4
Ray Gariepy	1	0	0	0	4
Harry Lumley	59	0	0	0	2
Al MacNeil	1	0	0	0	2
Willie Marshall	6	0	0	0	0
Gilles Mayer	6	0	0	0	0
Dave Reid	4	0	0	0	0
Lefty Wilson	1	0	0	0	0

Goaltending

Player	MIN	GP	W	L	T	GA	GAA	SA	SV	SV%	SO
Harry Lumley	3527	59	21	28	10	157	2.67				3
Ed Chadwick	300	5	2	0	3	3	0.60				2
Gilles Mayer	360	6	1	5	0	18	3.00				0
Lefty Wilson	13	1	0	0	0	0	0.00				0
Team:	4200	70	24	33	13	178	2.54				5

=== Playoffs ===
Scoring

Player	GP	G	A	Pts	PIM
George Armstrong	5	4	2	6	0
Dick Duff	5	1	4	5	2
Jimmy Thomson	5	0	3	3	10
Ron Stewart	5	1	1	2	2
Ron Hurst	3	0	2	2	4
Marc Reaume	5	0	2	2	6
Brian Cullen	5	1	0	1	2
Billy Harris	5	1	0	1	4
Gerry James	5	1	0	1	8
Sid Smith	5	1	0	1	0
Earl Balfour	3	0	1	1	2
Hugh Bolton	5	0	1	1	0
Gord Hannigan	4	0	0	0	4
Tim Horton	2	0	0	0	4
Harry Lumley	5	0	0	0	2
Rudy Migay	5	0	0	0	6
Jim Morrison	5	0	0	0	4
Tod Sloan	2	0	0	0	5

Goaltending

Player	MIN	GP	W	L	T	GA	GAA	SA	SV	SV%	SO
Harry Lumley	304	5	1	4		13	2.57				1
Team:	304	5	1	4		13	2.57				1

== See also ==
- 1955–56 NHL season
