= Jacques Deslauriers =

Canadian ice hockey player (1928–2018)

- Born: September 3, 1928 Montreal, Quebec, Canada
- Died: February 17, 2018 (aged 89) Repentigny, Quebec, Canada
- Height: 6 ft 0 in (183 cm)
- Weight: 170 lb (77 kg; 12 st 2 lb)
- Position: Defence
- Shot: Left
- Played for: Montreal Canadiens
- Playing career: 1948–1962

Joseph Thomas Frederic Jacques Deslauriers (September 3, 1928 – February 17, 2018) was a Canadian professional ice hockey defenceman who played 2 games in the National Hockey League for the Montreal Canadiens during the 1955–56 season. The rest of his career, which lasted from 1948 to 1962, was spent in the minor leagues.

== Career statistics ==
=== Regular season and playoffs ===
			Regular season					Playoffs
Season	Team	League	GP	G	A	Pts	PIM	GP	G	A	Pts	PIM
1945–46	Montreal Nationale	QJHL	19	3	4	7	19	4	0	0	0	2
1946–47	Laval Titan	QJHL	27	7	12	19	47	12	2	7	9	11
1947–48	Laval Titan	QJHL	32	6	8	14	24	12	1	7	8	29
1947–48	Laval Titan	M-Cup	—	—	—	—	—	8	1	4	5	10
1948–49	Dallas Texans	USHL	56	2	11	13	36	4	0	0	0	0
1949–50	Cincinnati Mohawks	AHL	52	0	4	4	18	—	—	—	—	—
1950–51	Valleyfield Braves	QSHL	53	2	13	15	32	15	2	4	6	8
1951–52	Valleyfield Braves	QSHL	60	7	9	16	22	6	1	0	1	2
1952–53	Valleyfield Braves	QSHL	60	8	17	25	18	4	0	0	0	6
1953–54	Valleyfield Braves	QSHL	57	6	14	20	14	7	1	1	2	0
1954–55	Valleyfield Braves	QSHL	61	7	25	32	40	—	—	—	—	—
1955–56	Montreal Canadiens	NHL	2	0	0	0	0	—	—	—	—	—
1955–56	Montreal Royals	QSHL	63	4	21	25	26	13	2	2	4	12
1956–57	Montreal Royals	QSHL	68	11	21	32	46	4	0	1	1	0
1956–57	Rochester Americans	AHL	2	0	1	1	0	—	—	—	—	—
1957–58	Chicoutimi Sagueneens	QSHL	56	8	16	24	26	6	1	0	1	2
1958–59	Montreal Royals	QSHL	51	5	15	20	32	8	0	2	2	4
1959–60	Montreal Royals	EPHL	52	3	9	12	44	14	0	5	5	4
1960–61	Granby Vics	ETSHL	—	—	—	—	—	—	—	—	—	—
1961–62	Granby Vics	ETSHL	—	—	—	—	—	—	—	—	—	—
1961–62	Granby Vics	Al-Cup	—	—	—	—	—	7	0	2	2	4
QSHL totals			529	58	151	209	256	63	7	10	17	34
NHL totals			2	0	0	0	0	—	—	—	—	—
