= Hugh Bolton (ice hockey) =

Canadian ice hockey player

- Born: April 15, 1929 Toronto, Ontario, Canada
- Died: October 17, 1999 (aged 70) Etobicoke, Ontario, Canada
- Height: 6 ft 3 in (191 cm)
- Weight: 192 lb (87 kg; 13 st 10 lb)
- Position: Defence
- Shot: Right
- Played for: Toronto Maple Leafs
- Playing career: 1949–1957

Hugh Edward "Yug" Bolton (April 15, 1929 in Toronto, Ontario — October 17, 1999 in Etobicoke, Ontario) was a Canadian ice hockey player. A defenceman, he played in the National Hockey League for the Toronto Maple Leafs between 1949 and 1956. With Toronto he won the Stanley Cup in 1951.

== Career statistics ==
=== Regular season and playoffs ===
| | | | Regular season | | | | | Playoffs |
| Season | Team | League | GP | G | A | Pts | PIM | GP | G | A | Pts | PIM |
|---|---|---|---|---|---|---|---|---|---|---|---|---|
| 1945–46 | Toronto Young Rangers | OHA | 24 | 5 | 5 | 10 | 6 | 1 | 0 | 0 | 0 | 0 |
| 1946–47 | Toronto Young Rangers | OHA | 15 | 7 | 2 | 9 | 16 | — | — | — | — | — |
| 1947–48 | Toronto Marlboros | OHA | 32 | 3 | 13 | 16 | 42 | — | — | — | — | — |
| 1947–48 | Toronto Marlboros | OHA Sr | 2 | 0 | 1 | 1 | 0 | — | — | — | — | — |
| 1948–49 | Toronto Marlboros | OHA | 18 | 5 | 2 | 7 | 24 | 10 | 3 | 2 | 5 | 4 |
| 1948–49 | Toronto Marlboros | OHA SR | — | — | — | — | — | 1 | 0 | 1 | 1 | 4 |
| 1948–49 | Toronto Marlboros | Al-Cup | — | — | — | — | — | 13 | 1 | 0 | 1 | 29 |
| 1949–50 | Toronto Maple Leafs | NHL | 2 | 0 | 0 | 0 | 2 | — | — | — | — | — |
| 1949–50 | Toronto Marlboros | OHA Sr | 38 | 9 | 31 | 40 | 35 | 2 | 0 | 0 | 0 | 2 |
| 1949–50 | Toronto Marlboros | Al-Cup | — | — | — | — | — | 15 | 6 | 14 | 20 | 22 |
| 1950–51 | Toronto Maple Leafs | NHL | 13 | 1 | 3 | 4 | 4 | — | — | — | — | — |
| 1950–51 | Pittsburgh Hornets | AHL | 9 | 2 | 4 | 6 | 6 | 13 | 1 | 3 | 4 | 6 |
| 1951–52 | Toronto Maple Leafs | NHL | 60 | 3 | 13 | 16 | 73 | 3 | 0 | 0 | 0 | 4 |
| 1952–53 | Toronto Maple Leafs | NHL | 9 | 0 | 0 | 0 | 10 | — | — | — | — | — |
| 1952–53 | Pittsburgh Hornets | AHL | 35 | 1 | 9 | 10 | 58 | 6 | 2 | 0 | 2 | 7 |
| 1953–54 | Toronto Maple Leafs | NHL | 9 | 0 | 0 | 0 | 10 | 5 | 0 | 1 | 1 | 4 |
| 1953–54 | Ottawa Senators | QHL | 24 | 2 | 15 | 17 | 10 | — | — | — | — | — |
| 1954–55 | Toronto Maple Leafs | NHL | 69 | 2 | 19 | 21 | 55 | 4 | 0 | 3 | 3 | 6 |
| 1955–56 | Toronto Maple Leafs | NHL | 67 | 4 | 16 | 20 | 65 | 5 | 0 | 1 | 1 | 0 |
| 1956–57 | Toronto Maple Leafs | NHL | 6 | 0 | 0 | 0 | 2 | — | — | — | — | — |
| 1956–57 | Rochester Americans | AHL | 5 | 0 | 1 | 1 | 2 | — | — | — | — | — |
| NHL totals | | | 235 | 10 | 51 | 61 | 221 | 17 | 0 | 5 | 5 | 14 |

== Awards and achievements ==
- 1950 Allan Cup Championship (Toronto)
- 1951 Stanley Cup Championship (Toronto
- 1956 NHL All Star (Toronto)
