= Conception Bay Sports Arena =

Ice arena in Newfoundland and Labrador, Canada

The Conception Bay Sports Arena, also known as the Bay Roberts Arena, was an open-air ice arena with an artificial ice surface located in Bay Roberts, Newfoundland and Labrador, Canada. The arena was located on the Conception Bay highway at the hub of the communities of Bay Roberts, Coley's Point, Brigus, Shearstown, Harbour Grace and Carbonear. The rink had the first artificial ice surface in Conception Bay but was used less than three years from 1956 to 1958.

== History ==
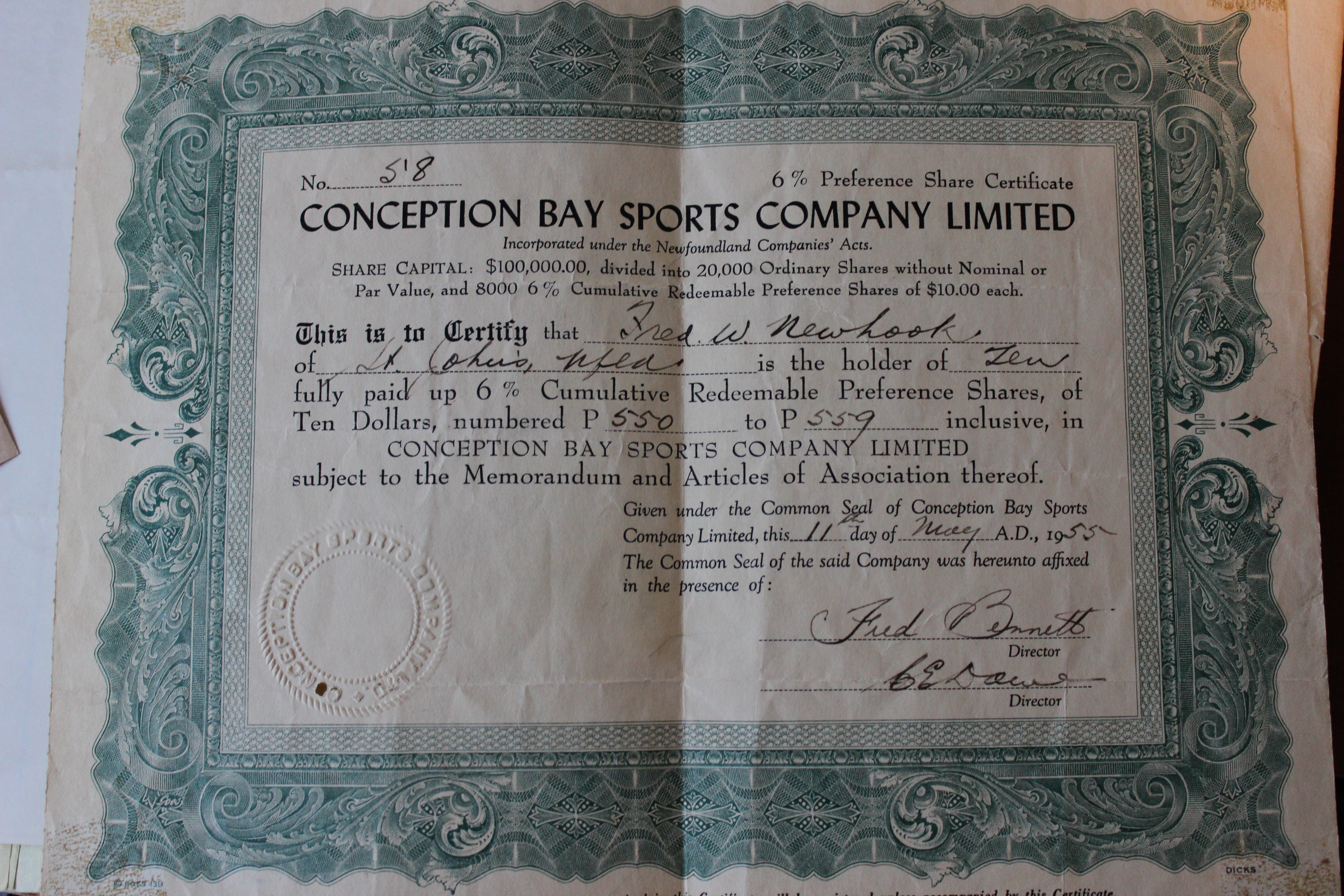

Fred Bennett, a businessman from Bay Roberts, was the main driving force behind the campaign to build an arena in Conception Bay North. In the fall of 1954 Bennett contacted a number of people with the hope of raising funds for the construction of a new arena. Four businessmen from St. John's formed the Conception Bay Sports Company Limited. Between 3000 and 4000 preferred shares in the new company were for sale to the public at $10 each to help raise the required funds to build the new arena. Bennett became the first managing director of the company.

== Construction ==
The arena was designed and constructed by the architectural firm Newhook & Morgan Engineering Limited. The original design was an enclosed structure measuring 115 by 220 feet (35 by 67 m) with a steel frame with wooden walls and a corrugated asbestos roof, but those plans were never realized. The rink, with surrounding boards, was built with dimensions of 185 by 85 feet (56 by 26 m). The total cost of the new arena was budgeted at $102,000, which included a $35,000 ice-freezing plant. There were plans to build seating for 1500 spectators at an additional cost of $20,000. The steel for the structure was fabricated by Humphries, Hollom Constructional Steel Engineers of London, England, but the building was never erected.

Initial site work to clear the land began on May 6, 1955. The first sod was turned in the first week of September 1955. The installation of the refrigeration plant to produce artificial ice began on December 5, 1955.

== Location ==
The location chosen was in western Bay Roberts opposite Delaney's Forge on the Conception Bay highway. Land was purchased from Mrs. Cliff Pike, Mrs. Allan Mercer, Miss Veronica Delaney and Philip Delaney. Additional land required to extend the site was purchased from Mrs. Gus Badcock and Andrew Noseworthy.

== Opening ==
The official opening of the arena was on Saturday February 4, 1956. The first hockey game at the new rink was played on opening night between the Shearstown Tigers of the Conception Bay North Hockey League and the Guards of the St. John's Senior Hockey League. 1200 spectators watched the first game end in a 3-3 tie.

== Notable events ==
Hockey history was made on April 9, 1956 when the first recorded outdoor hockey game in Canada by an NHL team was played at the arena. The Boston Bruins, led by the legendary Terry Sawchuk, were on an exhibition tour of the Maritimes and Newfoundland. It was also the second ever outdoor game by an NHL team on record. The Bruins played one period each with four local teams of the Conception Bay North Hockey League.

== Closure ==
The building was never enclosed as designed mainly due to funding issues. The arena was not a financial success and was closed in 1958. One of the events that led to its closure was the opening of the Harbour Grace Recreation Centre in January 1958 which became the primary venue for hockey in Conception Bay North. By 1959, the Conception Bay Arena was dismantled and the ice plant was installed in the new Clarenville stadium which would be the town's first artificial ice surface when the arena opened in December 1959.
