= Andy Hebenton =

Canadian ice hockey player (1929–2019)

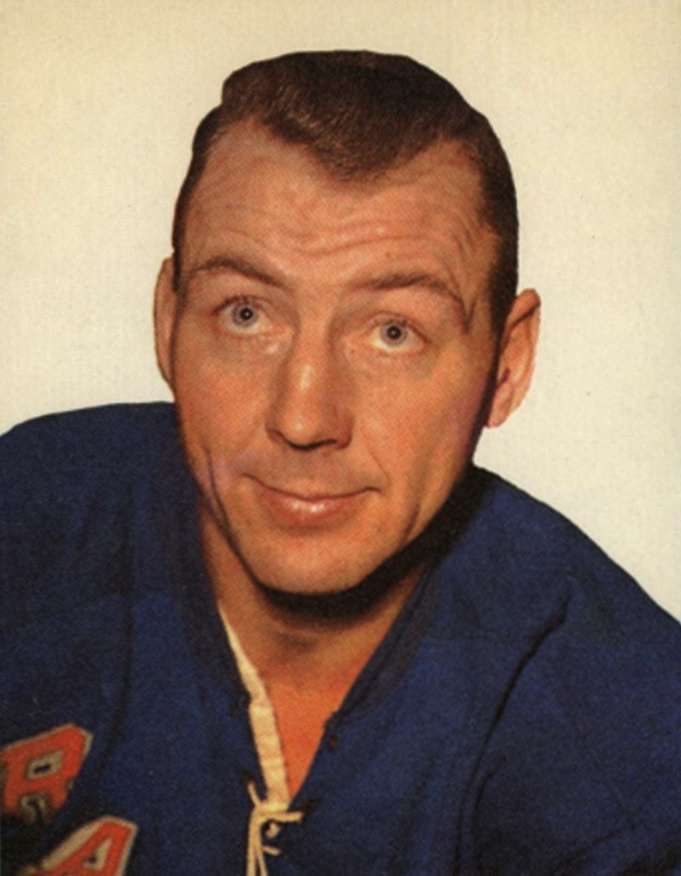
- Hebenton on a 1962 Topps hockey card
- Born: October 3, 1929 Winnipeg, Manitoba, Canada
- Died: January 29, 2019 (aged 89) Gresham, Oregon, U.S.
- Height: 5 ft 9 in (175 cm)
- Weight: 182 lb (83 kg; 13 st 0 lb)
- Position: Right wing
- Shot: Left
- Played for: New York Rangers; Boston Bruins
- Playing career: 1949–1976

Andrew Alexander "Spuds" Hebenton (October 3, 1929 – January 29, 2019) was a Canadian professional ice hockey right winger. At the time of his retirement, he held the record for the longest streak without missing a game in professional hockey history.

== Playing career ==
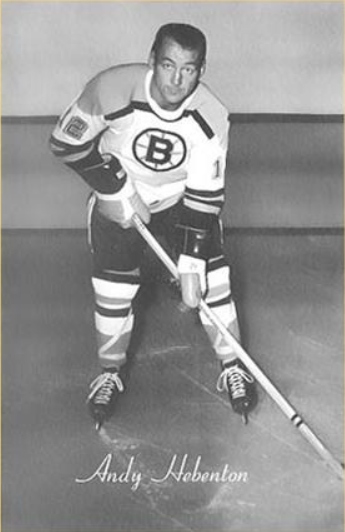
1963-64 card of Hebenton for Boston Bruins in his final NHL season

After playing junior hockey for a local Winnipeg team, Hebenton made his professional debut in 1949 for the Cincinnati Mohawks of the American Hockey League. The following season he moved on to the Victoria Cougars of the Pacific Coast Hockey League (subsequently renamed the Western Hockey League (WHL). He starred with Victoria for five seasons, his best year being 1955, when he scored 46 goals and was named to the league's First All-Star team.

The following season his rights were purchased by the New York Rangers of the NHL, for whom he played for eight seasons. Hebenton scored his first NHL goal on October 16, 1955, in New York's 4-1 loss at Boston. He scored twenty goals or more in five of those seasons, his best year coming in 1958–59, when he scored 33 goals and 29 assists and was the runner up for the Lady Byng Memorial Trophy for gentlemanly play, which he had won in 1956-57. After the 1962–63 season, the Boston Bruins acquired Hebenton in the waiver draft, for whom he played his final NHL season. He played 630 straight NHL games in all, breaking the record for the most consecutive games which is now currently held by Phil Kessel.

Hebenton's rights were sold by Boston after the 1963–64 season to the Portland Buckaroos of the WHL, and he remained in Portland for the rest of the league's history (barring two seasons back in Victoria), becoming one of the WHL's all-time leading scorers and perennial stars, and missing only two games. He was a perennial winner of the Fred Hume Cup for gentlemanly play, winning it nearly half the seasons it was offered, the final time when he was 43 years old.

From the last six games of the 1951-52 to the first two of the 1967-68 season, Hebenton played at 1,062 consecutive regular season professional games. Including playoffs, which aren't included in NHL records, Hebenton played a total of 1,131 consecutive games. Hebenton missed two games in 1967 to attend the funeral of his father in Winnipeg. He continued to play for the remainder of the 1967-68 season without missing a game, as well as for the next six seasons thereafter.

== Retirement ==
When the WHL folded in 1974, Hebenton played four games for the Seattle Totems in the Central Hockey League to wrap up his professional career, having played 26 professional seasons in all, a mark exceeded only by Gordie Howe and Jaromír Jágr in hockey history. He played two seasons for a version of the Buckaroos in semi-pro leagues before hanging up his skates for good.

In all, Hebenton played in 630 NHL games, scoring 189 goals and 202 assists for 391 points. He likewise played in 1056 PCHL/WHL games, scoring 425 goals and 532 assists for 957 points. Hebenton's remarkable consecutive games streak lasted at least from the 1952 season through to the end of the 1967 season—he missed three games in 1951 for the Victoria Cougars and two games in 1967/1968 with the Portland Buckaroos-so the streak was likely longer, for an unrivalled total of at least 1,054 consecutive games. By contrast, Doug Jarvis' professional streak—the second longest in history—is 988 games. He died on January 29, 2019, in at an assisted living facility in Gresham, Oregon, at the age of 89.

Hebenton was inducted into the Manitoba Sports Hall of Fame in 2009.

== Career achievements ==
- MJHL Second All-Star Team (1949)
- PCHL Championship (1951)
- WHL Championships (1965 & 1966)
- WHL Second All-Star Team (1955, 1965 & 1970)
- WHL First All-Star Team (1971 & 1973)
- Lady Byng Trophy (1957)
- Played in NHL All-Star Game in 1960
- Fred Hume Cup Winner (Most Gentlemanly Player WHL) (1965, 1970, 1971, 1972, 1973 & 1974)
- Currently fifth all-time in NHL for consecutive games played
- Fourth all-time in WHL games played, third in goals scored, eighth in assists and fourth in points scored.
- Honoured Member of the Manitoba Hockey Hall of Fame
- In the 2009 book 100 Ranger Greats, was ranked No. 53 all-time of the 901 New York Rangers who had played during the team's first 82 seasons

== Family ==
Hebenton's son Clay was a professional hockey goaltender between 1973–1980, most notably as the starting goaltender for the World Hockey Association's Phoenix Roadrunners in the 1977 season.

== Career statistics ==
=== Regular season and playoffs ===
			Regular season					Playoffs
Season	Team	League	GP	G	A	Pts	PIM	GP	G	A	Pts	PIM
1946–47	St. Boniface Canadiens	MAHA	—	—	—	—	—	—	—	—	—	—
1946–47	Winnipeg Canadians	MJHL	24	21	13	34	15	—	—	—	—	—
1947–48	Winnipeg Canadians	MJHL	30	30	13	43	34	6	5	3	8	6
1949–50	Cincinnati Mohawks	AHL	44	8	7	15	0	—	—	—	—	—
1949–50	Montreal Royals	QSHL	5	0	2	2	0	—	—	—	—	—
1950–51	Victoria Cougars	PCHL	56	16	16	32	12	12	6	3	9	2
1951–52	Victoria Cougars	PCHL	67	31	25	56	81	13	6	6	12	5
1952–53	Victoria Cougars	WHL	70	27	24	51	46	—	—	—	—	—
1953–54	Victoria Cougars	WHL	70	21	24	45	29	5	3	1	4	0
1954–55	Victoria Cougars	WHL	70	46	34	80	20	5	1	1	2	2
1955–56	New York Rangers	NHL	70	24	14	38	8	5	1	0	1	2
1956–57	New York Rangers	NHL	70	21	23	44	10	5	2	0	2	2
1957–58	New York Rangers	NHL	70	21	24	45	17	6	2	3	5	4
1958–59	New York Rangers	NHL	70	33	29	62	8	—	—	—	—	—
1959–60	New York Rangers	NHL	70	19	27	46	4	—	—	—	—	—
1960–61	New York Rangers	NHL	70	26	28	54	10	—	—	—	—	—
1961–62	New York Rangers	NHL	70	18	24	42	10	6	1	2	3	0
1962–63	New York Rangers	NHL	70	15	22	37	8	—	—	—	—	—
1963–64	Boston Bruins	NHL	70	12	11	23	8	—	—	—	—	—
1964–65	Portland Buckaroos	WHL	70	34	40	74	16	10	7	6	13	0
1965–66	Victoria Maple Leafs	WHL	72	31	45	76	12	14	6	11	17	14
1966–67	Victoria Maple Leafs	WHL	72	24	36	60	19	—	—	—	—	—
1967–68	Portland Buckaroos	WHL	70	16	29	45	10	12	4	3	7	0
1968–69	Portland Buckaroos	WHL	74	26	51	77	26	11	2	1	3	0
1969–70	Portland Buckaroos	WHL	72	36	42	78	9	11	2	7	9	0
1970–71	Portland Buckaroos	WHL	72	29	52	81	10	11	6	3	9	14
1971–72	Portland Buckaroos	WHL	72	30	34	64	12	11	3	4	7	2
1972–73	Portland Buckaroos	WHL	72	30	36	66	26	—	—	—	—	—
1973–74	Portland Buckaroos	WHL	78	28	44	72	16	10	2	4	6	2
1974–75	Seattle Totems	CHL	4	0	0	0	0	—	—	—	—	—
1974–75	Portland Buckaroos	WIHL	20	4	11	15	0	—	—	—	—	—
WHL totals			934	378	491	869	251	100	35	42	77	34
NHL totals			630	189	202	391	83	22	6	5	11	8

Preceded by Earl Reibel	Winner of the Lady Byng Trophy; 1957	Succeeded by Camille Henry
