= Norm Corcoran =

Canadian ice hockey player

- Born: August 15, 1931 Toronto, Ontario, Canada
- Died: March 13, 2009 (aged 77)
- Height: 6 ft 0 in (183 cm)
- Weight: 165 lb (75 kg; 11 st 11 lb)
- Position: Centre
- Shot: Right
- Played for: Boston Bruins; Detroit Red Wings; Chicago Black Hawks
- Playing career: 1949–1966

Norman Joseph Corcoran (August 15, 1931 — March 13, 2009) was a Canadian ice hockey forward.

== Career ==
Corcoran began his National Hockey League career with the Boston Bruins in 1949 and also played with the Detroit Red Wings and Chicago Black Hawks. He left the NHL following the 1956 season and retired from hockey in 1966. The majority of his career was spent in the American Hockey League.

== Career statistics ==
=== Regular season and playoffs ===
| | | | Regular season | | | | | Playoffs |
| Season | Team | League | GP | G | A | Pts | PIM | GP | G | A | Pts | PIM |
|---|---|---|---|---|---|---|---|---|---|---|---|---|
| 1946–47 | St. Michael's Buzzers | OHA B | 12 | 1 | 8 | 9 | 10 | — | — | — | — | — |
| 1948–49 | St. Michael's Buzzers | OHA | 28 | 2 | 2 | 4 | 32 | — | — | — | — | — |
| 1949–50 | St. Catharines Teepees | OHA | 46 | 33 | 36 | 69 | 102 | 5 | 6 | 0 | 6 | 4 |
| 1949–50 | Boston Bruins | NHL | 1 | 0 | 0 | 0 | 0 | — | — | — | — | — |
| 1949–50 | Boston Olympics | EAHL | 2 | 3 | 2 | 5 | 4 | 5 | 1 | 1 | 2 | 12 |
| 1950–51 | Hershey Bears | AHL | 68 | 17 | 24 | 41 | 96 | 2 | 0 | 0 | 0 | 0 |
| 1951–52 | Hershey Bears | AHL | 54 | 22 | 21 | 43 | 71 | 5 | 1 | 0 | 1 | 6 |
| 1952–53 | Boston Bruins | NHL | 1 | 0 | 0 | 0 | 0 | — | — | — | — | — |
| 1952–53 | Hershey Bears | AHL | 60 | 15 | 22 | 37 | 92 | 3 | 1 | 0 | 1 | 0 |
| 1953–54 | Hershey Bears | AHL | 69 | 22 | 36 | 58 | 70 | 11 | 5 | 7 | 12 | 18 |
| 1954–55 | Boston Bruins | NHL | 2 | 0 | 0 | 0 | 2 | 4 | 0 | 0 | 0 | 6 |
| 1954–55 | Hershey Bears | AHL | 61 | 16 | 30 | 46 | 90 | — | — | — | — | — |
| 1955–56 | Detroit Red Wings | NHL | 2 | 0 | 0 | 0 | 0 | — | — | — | — | — |
| 1955–56 | Edmonton Flyers | WHL | 35 | 12 | 15 | 27 | 48 | — | — | — | — | — |
| 1955–56 | Chicago Black Hawks | NHL | 23 | 1 | 3 | 4 | 19 | — | — | — | — | — |
| 1956–57 | Trois-Rivières Lions | QHL | 49 | 16 | 25 | 41 | 72 | 4 | 2 | 1 | 3 | 4 |
| 1956–57 | Springfield Indians | AHL | 12 | 0 | 1 | 1 | 2 | — | — | — | — | — |
| 1957–58 | Buffalo Bisons | AHL | 67 | 14 | 37 | 51 | 26 | — | — | — | — | — |
| 1958–59 | Trois-Rivières Lions | QHL | 58 | 13 | 32 | 45 | 51 | 6 | 0 | 0 | 0 | 2 |
| 1959–60 | Quebec Aces | AHL | 56 | 18 | 27 | 45 | 52 | — | — | — | — | — |
| 1960–61 | Quebec Aces | AHL | 61 | 22 | 35 | 57 | 57 | — | — | — | — | — |
| 1961–62 | Pittsburgh Hornets | AHL | 67 | 17 | 34 | 51 | 41 | — | — | — | — | — |
| 1962–63 | Pittsburgh Hornets | AHL | 25 | 1 | 1 | 2 | 4 | — | — | — | — | — |
| 1962–63 | Edmonton Flyers | WHL | 30 | 9 | 10 | 19 | 4 | 3 | 0 | 0 | 0 | 0 |
| 1963–64 | Providence Reds | AHL | 52 | 11 | 14 | 25 | 19 | 2 | 3 | 0 | 3 | 0 |
| 1964–65 | Providence Reds | AHL | 36 | 7 | 11 | 18 | 12 | — | — | — | — | — |
| 1965–66 | Buffalo Bisons | AHL | 31 | 2 | 4 | 6 | 14 | — | — | — | — | — |
| AHL totals | | | 719 | 184 | 297 | 481 | 646 | 23 | 10 | 7 | 17 | 24 |
| NHL totals | | | 29 | 1 | 3 | 4 | 21 | 4 | 0 | 0 | 0 | 6 |
