= Warren Godfrey =

Canadian ice hockey player

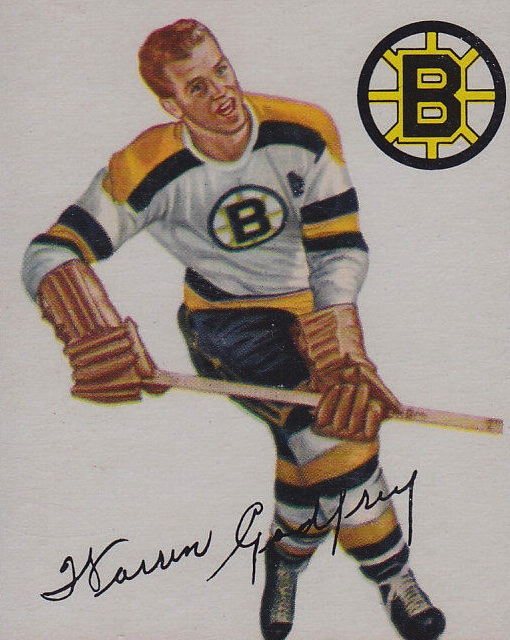
- Born: March 23, 1931; Toronto, Ontario, Canada
- Died: April 5, 1997 (aged 66); Canada
- Height: 6 ft 1 in (185 cm)
- Weight: 190 lb (86 kg; 13 st 8 lb)
- Position: Defence
- Shot: Left
- Played for: Boston Bruins; Detroit Red Wings
- Playing career: 1951–1969

Warren Godfrey (March 23, 1931 – April 5, 1997) was a Canadian ice hockey defenceman. He played in the National Hockey League with the Boston Bruins and Detroit Red Wings between 1952 and 1968.

== Playing career ==
Godfrey began his National Hockey League career with the Boston Bruins in 1952. He spent the majority of his career with the Detroit Red Wings where he retired following the 1968 season. He also spent time in the Pacific Coast Hockey League, American Hockey League and Central Hockey League.

Godfrey scored his first NHL goal as a member of the Boston Bruins. It occurred on January 11, 1953 in Boston's 4-2 loss to Detroit.

== Career statistics ==
=== Regular season and playoffs ===
			Regular season					Playoffs
Season	Team	League	GP	G	A	Pts	PIM	GP	G	A	Pts	PIM
1949–50	Galt Red Wings	OHA	17	4	2	6	8	—	—	—	—	—
1950–51	Waterloo Hurricanes	OHA	51	11	14	25	131	—	—	—	—	—
1950–51	Ayr Centennials	OHA Sr	3	0	1	1	0	—	—	—	—	—
1951–52	Tacoma Rockets	PCHL	61	8	17	25	66	7	1	0	1	2
1952–53	Boston Bruins	NHL	60	1	13	14	40	11	0	1	1	2
1953–54	Boston Bruins	NHL	70	5	9	14	71	4	0	0	0	4
1954–55	Boston Bruins	NHL	62	1	17	18	58	3	0	0	0	0
1955–56	Detroit Red Wings	NHL	67	2	6	8	86	—	—	—	—	—
1956–57	Detroit Red Wings	NHL	69	1	8	9	103	5	0	0	0	6
1957–58	Detroit Red Wings	NHL	67	2	16	18	56	4	0	0	0	0
1958–59	Detroit Red Wings	NHL	69	6	4	10	44	—	—	—	—	—
1959–60	Detroit Red Wings	NHL	69	5	9	14	60	6	1	0	1	10
1960–61	Detroit Red Wings	NHL	63	3	16	19	62	11	0	2	2	18
1961–62	Detroit Red Wings	NHL	69	4	13	17	84	—	—	—	—	—
1962–63	Boston Bruins	NHL	66	2	9	11	56	—	—	—	—	—
1963–64	Detroit Red Wings	NHL	4	0	0	0	2	—	—	—	—	—
1963–64	Pittsburgh Hornets	AHL	57	6	21	27	53	5	1	1	2	0
1964–65	Pittsburgh Hornets	AHL	56	7	25	32	44	4	1	2	3	6
1964–65	Detroit Red Wings	NHL	11	0	0	0	8	4	0	1	1	2
1965–66	Memphis Wings	CHL	11	0	5	5	10	—	—	—	—	—
1965–66	Detroit Red Wings	NHL	26	0	4	4	22	4	0	0	0	0
1966–67	Memphis Wings	CHL	2	0	0	0	0	—	—	—	—	—
1966–67	Detroit Red Wings	NHL	2	0	0	0	0	—	—	—	—	—
1966–67	Pittsburgh Hornets	AHL	59	2	12	14	54	9	2	1	3	14
1967–68	Detroit Red Wings	NHL	12	0	1	1	0	—	—	—	—	—
1967–68	Fort Worth Wings	CHL	41	2	13	15	52	13	0	3	3	12
1968–69	Rochester Americans	AHL	67	3	17	20	70	—	—	—	—	—
NHL totals			786	32	125	157	752	52	1	4	5	42
