= Bucky Hollingworth =

Canadian ice hockey player

- Born: July 24, 1933 Montreal, Quebec, Canada
- Died: February 2, 1974 (aged 40)
- Height: 5 ft 11 in (180 cm)
- Weight: 170 lb (77 kg; 12 st 2 lb)
- Position: Defence
- Shot: Left
- Played for: Chicago Black Hawks; Detroit Red Wings
- Playing career: 1953–1962

Gordon Howard "Gord, Bucky" Hollingworth (July 24, 1933 – February 2, 1974) was a Canadian ice hockey defenceman. Hollingworth played in the National Hockey League (NHL) for the Chicago Black Hawks and Detroit Red Wings between 1954 and 1958. The rest of his career, which lasted from 1953 to 1962, was spent in the minor leagues.

== Playing career ==
Hollingworth was born in Montreal, Quebec. He played junior hockey with the Montreal Junior Canadiens and began his professional career with the Montreal Royals of the Quebec Hockey League in 1953-54.

A defensive defenceman, he started his National Hockey League career with the Chicago Black Hawks in 1954. That season he recorded 12 points while playing in all 70 games for the Black Hawks. He was involved in a blockbuster trade on May 28, 1955, moving to the Detroit Red Wings with Dave Creighton, John McCormack and Jerry Toppazzini in exchange for Tony Leswick, Glen Skov, Johnny Wilson and Benny Woit.

Hollingworth played parts of three seasons with the Red Wings and left the NHL after the 1958 season. He finished his career in the American Hockey League with the Cleveland Barons and the Hershey Bears.

He retired from hockey completely in 1962 after being diagnosed with leukemia.

== Career statistics ==
=== Regular season and playoffs ===
			Regular season					Playoffs
Season	Team	League	GP	G	A	Pts	PIM	GP	G	A	Pts	PIM
1949–50	Montreal Junior Canadiens	QJHL	35	0	3	3	30	16	0	3	3	45
1949–50	Montreal Junior Canadiens	M-Cup	—	—	—	—	—	12	0	1	1	24
1950–51	Montreal Junior Canadiens	QJHL	45	2	16	18	122	9	2	1	3	35
1951–52	Montreal Junior Canadiens	QJHL	39	10	12	22	97	11	3	3	6	16
1951–52	Montreal Junior Canadiens	M-Cup	—	—	—	—	—	8	1	2	3	27
1952–53	Montreal Junior Canadiens	QJHL	45	6	11	17	106	7	0	1	1	15
1952–53	Montreal Royals	QMHL	1	0	0	0	0	—	—	—	—	—
1953–54	Montreal Royals	QSHL	63	2	16	18	78	11	1	4	5	14
1954–55	Chicago Black Hawks	NHL	70	3	9	12	135	—	—	—	—	—
1955–56	Detroit Red Wings	NHL	41	0	2	2	28	3	0	0	0	2
1956–57	Detroit Red Wings	NHL	25	0	1	1	16	—	—	—	—	—
1956–57	Springfield Indians	AHL	22	2	9	11	28	—	—	—	—	—
1957–58	Detroit Red Wings	NHL	27	1	2	3	22	—	—	—	—	—
1957–58	Hershey Bears	AHL	39	0	9	9	93	11	1	1	2	20
1958–59	Cleveland Barons	AHL	65	6	15	21	102	7	0	4	4	6
1959–60	Hershey Bears	AHL	63	5	15	20	131	—	—	—	—	—
1960–61	Hershey Bears	AHL	67	3	13	16	76	5	0	1	1	13
1961–62	Hershey Bears	AHL	45	0	11	11	63	—	—	—	—	—
AHL totals			301	16	72	88	493	23	1	6	7	39
NHL totals			163	4	14	18	201	3	0	0	0	2
