= Lorne Ferguson =

Canadian ice hockey player

- Born: May 26, 1930 Palmerston, Ontario, Canada
- Died: March 28, 2008 (aged 77)
- Height: 6 ft 0 in (183 cm)
- Weight: 185 lb (84 kg; 13 st 3 lb)
- Position: Left wing
- Shot: Left
- Played for: Chicago Black Hawks; Detroit Red Wings; Boston Bruins
- Playing career: 1949–1962; 1965–1970

Lorne Robert Ferguson (May 26, 1930 — March 28, 2008) was a Canadian ice hockey left winger who played 422 games in the National Hockey League. Born in Palmerston, Ontario, he played for the Boston Bruins, Detroit Red Wings, and Chicago Black Hawks between 1949 and 1959. The rest of his career, which lasted from 1949 to 1970, was spent in the minor leagues.

== Career statistics ==
=== Regular season and playoffs ===
			Regular season					Playoffs
Season	Team	League	GP	G	A	Pts	PIM	GP	G	A	Pts	PIM
1947–48	Guelph Biltmores	OHA	35	28	11	39	87	—	—	—	—	—
1948–49	Guelph Biltmores	OHA	46	38	24	62	52	—	—	—	—	—
1948–49	New York Rovers	QHL	9	6	3	9	7	—	—	—	—	—
1949–50	Boston Bruins	NHL	3	1	1	2	0	—	—	—	—	—
1949–50	Tulsa Oilers	USHL	70	35	35	70	21	—	—	—	—	—
1950–51	Boston Bruins	NHL	70	16	17	33	31	6	1	0	1	2
1951–52	Boston Bruins	NHL	27	3	4	7	14	—	—	—	—	—
1951–52	Hershey Bears	AHL	8	5	1	6	2	—	—	—	—	—
1952–53	Hershey Bears	AHL	64	25	40	65	56	3	0	2	2	6
1953–54	Hershey Bears	AHL	70	45	42	87	34	11	2	3	5	11
1954–55	Boston Bruins	NHL	69	20	14	34	24	4	1	0	1	2
1955–56	Boston Bruins	NHL	32	7	5	12	18	—	—	—	—	—
1955–56	Detroit Red Wings	NHL	31	8	7	15	12	10	1	2	3	12
1956–57	Detroit Red Wings	NHL	70	13	10	23	26	5	1	0	1	6
1957–58	Detroit Red Wings	NHL	15	1	3	4	0	—	—	—	—	—
1957–58	Chicago Black Hawks	NHL	38	6	9	15	24	—	—	—	—	—
1958–59	Chicago Black Hawks	NHL	67	7	10	17	44	6	2	1	3	2
1959–60	Buffalo Bisons	AHL	70	13	35	48	54	—	—	—	—	—
1960–61	Quebec Aces	AHL	13	1	1	2	2	—	—	—	—	—
1960–61	Kingston Frontenacs	EPHL	26	5	17	22	2	4	0	0	0	2
1961–62	Kingston Frontenacs	EPHL	48	9	15	24	35	2	0	0	0	14
1965–66	Kingston Aces	OHA Sr	12	6	4	10	8	5	0	1	1	6
1966–67	Kingston Aces	OHA Sr	—	—	—	—	—	—	—	—	—	—
1967–68	Kingston Aces	OHA Sr	10	8	4	12	2	—	—	—	—	—
1969–70	Belleville Mohawks	OHA Sr	9	2	2	4	2	—	—	—	—	—
NHL totals			422	82	80	162	193	31	6	3	9	24
