= 1955–56 NHL season =

National Hockey League season

- League: National Hockey League
- Sport: Ice hockey
- Duration: October 6, 1955 – April 10, 1956
- Games: 70
- Teams: 6
- TV partner(s): CBC, SRC (Canada); None (United States)

Regular season
- Season champion: Montreal Canadiens
- Season MVP: Jean Beliveau (Canadiens)
- Top scorer: Jean Beliveau (Canadiens)

Stanley Cup
- Champions: Montreal Canadiens
- Runners-up: Detroit Red Wings

NHL seasons
- ← 1954–55 1956–57 →

The 1955–56 NHL season was the 39th season of the National Hockey League. Six teams played 70 games each. The Montreal Canadiens were the Stanley Cup champions as they beat the Detroit Red Wings four games to one in the best-of-seven final series.

== League business ==
At a governors' meeting in December, a discussion took place concerning the uniforms worn by officials. It was contended that the present orange and black uniforms were confusing to players and fans, particularly when red uniforms were worn by either of the participating teams. Furthermore, it was pointed out that the existing uniforms showed up black on television. It was unanimously agreed that officials' uniforms should be changed to black and white vertical stripes. The black and white uniforms were first worn on December 29, 1955.

With Montreal frequently racking up two or three goals on any one power play, NHL President Clarence Campbell said he'd like the penalty rule revised to a penalized player returning to the ice when a power play goal is scored on a minor penalty. The Canadiens was the lone club to vote against the new legislation.

== Regular season ==
The streak of seven straight seasons at the top of the NHL held by the Detroit Red Wings' dynasty came to an end as the Montreal Canadiens were tops. The Canadiens set a new record for wins in a season with 45. The Canadiens had a new coach, their one-time great former All-Star left-winger, Hector "Toe" Blake.

Also in 1955, John Utendale became the first Black player to sign a contract directly with an NHL team, the Red Wings. Utendale practiced with the Red Wings but never played in an NHL game; instead, he played with the Edmonton Flyers, as they were the Red Wings' minor league affiliate. In 2006, Utendale's brother claimed that Red Wings coach Jack Adams had refused to give Utendale any playing time on the Red Wings because Adams objected to his relationship with a white woman whom Utendale later married.

Dick Irvin, formerly the coach in Montreal, whom Habs' GM Frank Selke Sr. found a little truculent, took over as coach in Chicago, but could not get them out of the cellar, though they did improve. It was sort of a homecoming for Irvin as he started his coaching career with Chicago in 1930.

=== Highlights ===
When the Hawks went to the Montreal Forum on October 22, Irvin was presented with a set of silver flatware by William Northey, representing the Canadian Arena Company. In the game itself, rookie Henri Richard scored two goals as Montreal shut out Chicago 6–0.

On November 5, Jean Beliveau scored three goals in 44 seconds as Montreal beat Boston 4–3. The record for the fastest hat trick still was held by Bill Mosienko with three goals in 21 seconds.

On December 29, officials debuted the new "zebra" outfits in a game between the Canadiens and Maple Leafs.

On January 11, a crowd of 15,570 delighted fans at Madison Square Garden watched the Rangers trounce the Canadiens 6–1. Pete Conacher was a star for the Rangers with two goals. Lou Fontinato and Maurice Richard had a gala fight and Fontinato knocked out Richard with a punch that required several stitches above Richard's eye.

Montreal routed the Rangers 9–4 on February 18 as Beliveau had the hat trick and Richard two. The Rocket was incensed when referee Louis Maschio gave his brother a misconduct penalty and his teammates had to cool him off.

Beliveau set a record for goals by a center when he scored his 45th goal on March 15. Maurice Richard was hurt in this game when he fell over Hawk defenceman Pierre Pilote's skate and went headlong into the goal. He required stitches and was taken to hospital for X-rays. The Rocket was back in the lineup on St. Patrick's Day as the Canadiens trounced the Rangers 7–2 and Richard had the hat trick.

Rookie Glenn Hall had 12 shutouts and a 2.11 goals-against average for the Detroit Red Wings. He received the Calder Memorial Trophy over Henri "Pocket Rocket" Richard.

=== Final standings ===
National Hockey League
		GP	W	L	T	GF	GA	DIFF	Pts
1	Montreal Canadiens	70	45	15	10	222	131	+91	100
2	Detroit Red Wings	70	30	24	16	183	148	+35	76
3	New York Rangers	70	32	28	10	204	203	+1	74
4	Toronto Maple Leafs	70	24	33	13	153	181	−28	61
5	Boston Bruins	70	23	34	13	147	185	−38	59
6	Chicago Black Hawks	70	19	39	12	155	216	−61	50

== Playoffs ==
=== Playoff bracket ===
The top four teams in the league qualified for the playoffs. In the semifinals, the first-place team played the third-place team, while the second-place team faced the fourth-place team, with the winners advancing to the Stanley Cup Final. In both rounds, teams competed in a best-of-seven series (scores in the bracket indicate the number of games won in each best-of-seven series).

Semifinals
1	Montreal	4
3	New York	1
2	Detroit	4
4	Toronto	1

Stanley Cup Final
1	Montreal	4
2	Detroit	1

=== Semifinals ===
==== (1) Montreal Canadiens vs. (3) New York Rangers ====
March 20	New York Rangers	1–7	Montreal Canadiens	Montreal Forum	Recap
No scoring		First period	13:29 – Bernie Geoffrion (1)
Jack Evans (1) – 06:45		Second period	04:17 – Maurice Richard (1); 17:48 – pp – Bernie Geoffrion (2); 18:30 – pp – Maurice Richard (2)
No scoring		Third period	01:55 – Maurice Richard (3); 14:33 – Dickie Moore (1); 15:32 – Jean Beliveau (1)
Gump Worsley 37 saves / 44 shots		Goalie stats	Jacques Plante 21 saves / 22 shots

March 22	New York Rangers	4–2	Montreal Canadiens	Montreal Forum	Recap
Andy Hebenton (1) – 03:45; Jean-Guy Gendron (1) pp – 14:41		First period	07:38 – Jean Beliveau (2)
No scoring		Second period	11:20 – pp – Claude Provost (1)
Bronco Horvath (1) – pp – 00:42; Dean Prentice (1) – 14:10		Third period	No scoring
Gordie Bell 32 saves / 34 shots		Goalie stats	Jacques Plante 23 saves / 27 shots

March 24	Montreal Canadiens	3–1	New York Rangers	Madison Square Garden III	Recap
Ken Mosdell (1) – 14:42		First period	16:02 – Jean-Guy Gendron (2)
Bert Olmstead (1) – 16:24		Second period	No scoring
Bert Olmstead (2) – en – 19:48		Third period	No scoring
Jacques Plante 9 saves / 10 shots		Goalie stats	Gump Worsley 21 saves / 23 shots

March 25	Montreal Canadiens	5–3	New York Rangers	Madison Square Garden III	Recap
Bert Olmstead (3) – pp – 02:11; Bert Olmstead (4) – 13:33		First period	16:26 – Wally Hergesheimer (1); 18:57 – pp – Bill Gadsby (1)
Jean Beliveau (3) – pp – 02:22; Claude Provost (2) – 03:22		Second period	No scoring
Jean Beliveau (4) – 08:16		Third period	15:04 – Andy Bathgate (1)
Jacques Plante 18 saves / 21 shots		Goalie stats	Gump Worsley 28 saves / 33 shots

March 27	New York Rangers	0–7	Montreal Canadiens	Montreal Forum	Recap
No scoring		First period	08:24 – pp – Doug Harvey (1)
No scoring		Second period	03:11 – Dickie Moore (2); 06:10 – Henri Richard (1); 13:00 – pp – Doug Harvey (2); 15:35 – Jean Beliveau (5)
No scoring		Third period	08:49 – Henri Richard (2); 13:28 – Dickie Moore (3)
Gordie Bell 29 saves / 36 shots		Goalie stats	Jacques Plante 29 saves / 29 shots

Montreal won series 4–1

==== (2) Detroit Red Wings vs. (4) Toronto Maple Leafs ====
March 20	Toronto Maple Leafs	2–3	Detroit Red Wings	Olympia Stadium	Recap
George Armstrong (1) – pp – 11:57		First period	No scoring
Ron Stewart (1) – 11:31		Second period	No scoring
No scoring		Third period	00:58 – Gordie Howe (1); 05:12 – Johnny Bucyk (1); 05:56 – Alex Delvecchio (1)
Harry Lumley 32 saves / 35 shots		Goalie stats	Glenn Hall 28 saves / 30 shots

March 22	Toronto Maple Leafs	1–3	Detroit Red Wings	Olympia Stadium	Recap
George Armstrong (2) – 05:09		First period	No scoring
No scoring		Second period	05:40 – Alex Delvecchio (2); 19:05 – Ted Lindsay (1)
No scoring		Third period	14:39 – Lorne Ferguson (1)
Harry Lumley 37 saves / 40 shots		Goalie stats	Glenn Hall 21 saves / 22 shots

March 24	Detroit Red Wings	5–4	OT	Toronto Maple Leafs	Maple Leaf Gardens	Recap
Red Kelly (1) – 12:27		First period		00:29 – George Armstrong (3); 16:33 – pp – Brian Cullen (1)
No scoring		Second period		13:20 – sh – Gerry James (1)
Metro Prystai (1) – 02:46; Gordie Howe (2) – 09:11; Ted Lindsay (2) – 14:25		Third period		07:40 – pp – George Armstrong (4)
Ted Lindsay (3) – 04:22		First overtime period		No scoring
Glenn Hall 39 saves / 43 shots		Goalie stats		Harry Lumley 33 saves / 38 shots

March 27	Detroit Red Wings	0–2	Toronto Maple Leafs	Maple Leaf Gardens	Recap
No scoring		First period	No scoring
No scoring		Second period	10:58 – Billy Harris (1)
No scoring		Third period	03:15 – Sid Smith (1)
Glenn Hall 30 saves / 32 shots		Goalie stats	Harry Lumley 33 saves / 33 shots

March 29	Toronto Maple Leafs	1–3	Detroit Red Wings	Olympia Stadium	Recap
Dick Duff (1) – pp – 05:34		First period	08:38 – pp – Alex Delvecchio (3); 14:49 – Alex Delvecchio (4)
No scoring		Second period	No scoring
No scoring		Third period	19:35 – en – Ted Lindsay (4)
Harry Lumley 28 saves / 30 shots		Goalie stats	Glenn Hall 22 saves / 23 shots

Detroit won series 4–1

=== Stanley Cup Final ===
March 31	Detroit Red Wings	4–6	Montreal Canadiens	Montreal Forum	Recap
Alex Delvecchio (5) – pp – 08:17		First period	No scoring
Bill Dineen (1) – 03:45; Ted Lindsay (5) – 08:11; Alex Delvecchio (6) – pp – 11:20		Second period	03:00 – pp – Jean Beliveau (6); 06:40 – Henri Richard (3)
No scoring		Third period	05:20 – Jack LeClair (1); 06:20 – Bernie Geoffrion (3); 07:31 – Jean Beliveau (7); 10:49 – Claude Provost (3)
Glenn Hall 38 saves / 44 shots		Goalie stats	Jacques Plante 23 saves / 27 shots

April 3	Detroit Red Wings	1–5	Montreal Canadiens	Montreal Forum	Recap
No scoring		First period	07:23 – pp – Donnie Marshall (1)
No scoring		Second period	11:37 – Henri Richard (4); 14:38 – Bernie Geoffrion (4)
Norm Ullman (1) – 00:31		Third period	02:48 – Jean Beliveau (8); 19:21 – Maurice Richard (4)
Glenn Hall 30 saves / 35 shots		Goalie stats	Jacques Plante 19 saves / 20 shots

April 5	Montreal Canadiens	1–3	Detroit Red Wings	Olympia Stadium	Recap
Jean Beliveau (9) – 19:20		First period	14:27 – pp – Red Kelly (2)
No scoring		Second period	No scoring
No scoring		Third period	11:36 – Ted Lindsay (6); 18:12 – Gordie Howe (3)
Jacques Plante 22 saves / 25 shots		Goalie stats	Glenn Hall 20 saves / 21 shots

April 8	Montreal Canadiens	3–0	Detroit Red Wings	Olympia Stadium	Recap
Jean Beliveau (10) – 15:52		First period	No scoring
Jean Beliveau (11) – 11:39		Second period	No scoring
Floyd Curry (1) – 11:34		Third period	No scoring
Jacques Plante 24 saves / 24 shots		Goalie stats	Glenn Hall 27 saves / 30 shots

April 10	Detroit Red Wings	1–3	Montreal Canadiens	Montreal Forum	Recap
No scoring		First period	No scoring
No scoring		Second period	14:16 – pp – Jean Beliveau (12); 15:08 – pp – Maurice Richard (5)
Alex Delvecchio (7) – 00:35		Third period	00:13 – Bernie Geoffrion (5)
Glenn Hall 27 saves / 30 shots		Goalie stats	Jacques Plante 25 saves / 26 shots

Montreal won series 4–1

== Awards ==
Award winners
Prince of Wales Trophy: (Regular season champion)	Montreal Canadiens
Art Ross Trophy: (Top scorer)	Jean Beliveau, Montreal Canadiens
Calder Memorial Trophy: (Best first-year player)	Glenn Hall, Detroit Red Wings
Hart Trophy: (Most valuable player)	Jean Beliveau, Montreal Canadiens
James Norris Memorial Trophy: (Best defenceman)	Doug Harvey, Montreal Canadiens
Lady Byng Memorial Trophy: (Excellence and sportsmanship)	Earl Reibel, Detroit Red Wings
Vezina Trophy: (Goaltender of team with the best goals-against average)	Jacques Plante, Montreal Canadiens

=== All-Star teams ===
First team	Position	Second team
Jacques Plante, Montreal Canadiens	G	Glenn Hall, Detroit Red Wings
Doug Harvey, Montreal Canadiens	D	Red Kelly, Detroit Red Wings
Bill Gadsby, New York Rangers	D	Tom Johnson, Montreal Canadiens
Jean Beliveau, Montreal Canadiens	C	Tod Sloan, Toronto Maple Leafs
Maurice Richard, Montreal Canadiens	RW	Gordie Howe, Detroit Red Wings
Ted Lindsay, Detroit Red Wings	LW	Bert Olmstead, Montreal Canadiens

== Player statistics ==
=== Scoring leaders ===
Note: GP = Games played, G = Goals, A = Assists, PTS = Points, PIM = Penalties in minutes

Player	Team	GP	G	A	PTS	PIM
Jean Beliveau	Montreal Canadiens	70	47	41	88	143
Gordie Howe	Detroit Red Wings	70	38	41	79	100
Maurice Richard	Montreal Canadiens	70	38	33	71	89
Bert Olmstead	Montreal Canadiens	70	14	56	70	94
Tod Sloan	Toronto Maple Leafs	70	37	29	66	100
Andy Bathgate	New York Rangers	70	19	47	66	59
Bernie Geoffrion	Montreal Canadiens	59	29	33	62	66
Earl Reibel	Detroit Red Wings	68	17	39	56	10
Alex Delvecchio	Detroit Red Wings	70	25	26	51	24
Dave Creighton	New York Rangers	70	20	31	51	43

Source: NHL

=== Leading goaltenders ===
Note: GP = Games played; Min = Minutes played; GA = Goals against; GAA = Goals against average; W = Wins; L = Losses; T = Ties; SO = Shutouts

Player	Team	GP	MIN	GA	GAA	W	L	T	SO
Jacques Plante	Montreal Canadiens	64	3840	119	1.86	42	12	10	7
Glenn Hall	Detroit Red Wings	70	4200	147	2.10	30	24	16	12
Terry Sawchuk	Boston Bruins	68	4080	177	2.60	22	33	13	9
Harry Lumley	Toronto Maple Leafs	59	3527	159	2.70	21	28	10	3
Lorne Worsley	New York Rangers	70	4200	199	2.84	32	28	10	4
Al Rollins	Chicago Black Hawks	58	3480	172	2.97	17	30	11	3

== Coaches ==
- Boston Bruins: Milt Schmidt
- Chicago Black Hawks: Dick Irvin
- Detroit Red Wings: Jimmy Skinner
- Montreal Canadiens: Toe Blake
- New York Rangers: Phil Watson
- Toronto Maple Leafs: King Clancy

== Debuts ==
The following is a list of players of note who played their first NHL game in 1955–56 (listed with their first team, asterisk(*) marks debut in playoffs):

- Pierre Pilote, Chicago Black Hawks
- Norm Ullman, Detroit Red Wings
- Henri Richard, Montreal Canadiens
- Claude Provost, Montreal Canadiens
- Bob Turner, Montreal Canadiens
- Bronco Horvath, New York Rangers
- Andy Hebenton, New York Rangers
- Jean-Guy Gendron, New York Rangers
- Billy Harris, Toronto Maple Leafs

== Last games ==
The following is a list of players of note that played their last game in the NHL in 1955–56 (listed with their last team):

- Bill Quackenbush, Boston Bruins
- Ed Sandford, Chicago Black Hawks
- Bob Goldham, Detroit Red Wings
- Emile "Butch" Bouchard, Montreal Canadiens
- Don Raleigh, New York Rangers
- Joe Klukay, Toronto Maple Leafs

== Broadcasting ==
This was the fourth season of Hockey Night in Canada on CBC Television. Coverage included selected Stanley Cup playoff games. Both regular season and playoff games were not broadcast in their entirety until the 1968–69 season, and were typically joined in progress, while the radio version of HNIC aired games in their entirety.

== See also ==
- 1955–56 NHL transactions
- List of Stanley Cup champions
- 9th National Hockey League All-Star Game
- National Hockey League All-Star Game
- Ice hockey at the 1956 Winter Olympics
- 1955 in sports
- 1956 in sports
