= NHL on television in the 1960s =

From 1965 through 1975, in addition to the Saturday night game on CBC, Hockey Night in Canada also produced and broadcast a Wednesday night game on CTV, CBC's privately owned competitor; beginning in the 1975–76 NHL season, these midweek games would begin to be broadcast by local stations.

After CBS ended its four-year run of airing Saturday afternoon regular season games from 1956–57 to 1959–60, the NHL did not return to American network television until NBC televised selected 1966 playoff games. The clinching game of the 1966 Stanley Cup Finals then aired on RKO General-owned stations. CBS later agreed to air weekend afternoon regular-season games and playoff games from 1966–67 to 1971–72. Due to other programming commitments, CBS subleased its 1966-67 regular-season games to RKO General.

== Year-by-year breakdown ==
=== 1960 ===
CBS first broadcast National Hockey League Saturday afternoon games for four seasons from 1956–57 to 1959–60. Initially, Bud Palmer served as the play-by-play announcer while Fred Cusick did color commentary and intermission interviews for the first three seasons. In 1959–60, Cusick moved over to play-by-play while Brian McFarlane came in to do the color commentary and interviews. The pregame and intermission interviews were done on the ice, with the interviewer on skates. No playoff games were televised during this period and all broadcasts took place in one of the four American arenas at the time.

In the May 28 edition of the Winnipeg Free Press, a Canadian Press article mentioned the fact that the CBC fielded numerous angry calls from viewers upset that CBC continued to televise all three overtimes of the third game of the Toronto-Detroit playoff series. Because of this, the angry viewers missed several previously scheduled shows as the overtime continued on. The CBC said that the policy of telecasting each Stanley Cup playoff game to its conclusion would be enforced.

=== 1961 ===
Some semifinal playoff games may not have been seen outside the Toronto or Montreal metro areas. This may have been the first time that all playoff games were televised somewhere across Canada.

=== 1962 ===
CBC's Winnipeg affiliate carried Game 3 of the Montreal-Chicago playoff series at 8:30 p.m. Central time (9:30 p.m. Eastern time). Meanwhile, they aired The Ed Sullivan Show at 7:00 p.m. (8:00 p.m. Eastern), which included guest stars Wayne and Shuster. This was followed by Close-Up at 8:00 p.m. (9:00 p.m. Eastern) and then the hockey game in progress. On April 3, CBC's affiliates in and near Toronto aired The Garry Moore Show at 8 p.m. followed by Game 4 of the Toronto-New York Rangers game in progress at 9:00 p.m.

=== 1966 ===
CTV's involvement with the NHL began in the 1965–66 season with a series of Wednesday-night regular season games. These were produced by the McLaren ad agency, which also produced the Saturday night Hockey Night in Canada games for the CBC. As was the case with the Saturday games, they were contests (usually at home) of the Montreal Canadiens, Toronto Maple Leafs, and after 1970, the Vancouver Canucks. CTV decided to pull out of midweek NHL coverage in 1975, opening the way for local TV stations in the three Canadian cities which had NHL clubs to carry mid-week telecasts of their hometown NHL clubs (also usually on Wednesday nights).

On March 16, 1966, CTV's coverage of the game between the Canadiens and Maple Leafs was frequently interrupted for news updates on the Gemini 8 space mission, which had run into serious trouble after being successfully launched that morning; when the game ended, CTV joined a simulcast of CBS News coverage in time for the capsule's re-entry and splashdown.

There was no American network television coverage of the Stanley Cup playoffs until 1965–66 (which also marked the first telecasts of an NHL game in color), the second to last season of the Original Six era. The earliest known American television coverage of any kind occurred in 1956, when Games 3 and 5 of the Montreal-New York Rangers playoff series were televised in the New York area on WPIX 11 at 9 p.m. local time. Bud Palmer worked play-by-play for those games on WPIX while and Jack McCarthy hosted from the studio.

The regional issues that caused the NHL's previous American television deal with CBS to be terminated were settled by the league's pending addition of six new teams, which expanded the league's reach nationwide and into lucrative markets in Pennsylvania and California (in addition to two other midwestern markets; NBC, however, would lose the broadcast rights before the six new teams would make it to play). In 1966, NBC became the first television network in the United States to air a national broadcast of a Stanley Cup Playoff game. The network provided coverage of four Sunday afternoon playoff games during the 1965–66 postseason. NBC aired semifinal games between the Chicago Black Hawks and the Detroit Red Wings on April 10 and 17. They also aired Games 1 and 4 of the Stanley Cup Finals between the Montreal Canadiens and the Detroit Red Wings on April 24 and May 1, Win Elliot served as the play-by-play man while Bill Mazer served as the color commentator for the games.

NBC's coverage of the 1966 Stanley Cup Finals marked the first time that hockey games were broadcast on network television in color. The CBC followed suit the following year. NBC's Stanley Cup coverage preempted a sports anthology series called NBC Sports in Action, hosted by Jim Simpson and Bill Cullen, who were co-studio hosts for the Stanley Cup broadcasts. To accommodate the American TV coverage on NBC, Game 1 of the 1966 Stanley Cup Finals was shifted to a Sunday afternoon. This in return, was the first time ever that a National Hockey League game was played on a Sunday afternoon in Montreal.

In the United States, the clinching game of the 1966 Stanley Cup Finals on the evening of Thursday, May 5 aired on RKO General's stations, such as WOR-TV in New York City and WHCT in Hartford, Connecticut. The commentators for RKO's coverage on that occasion were Bob Wolff and Emile Francis. Wolff at the time did play-by-play for New York Rangers games seen on WOR.

Although the TV listings page of the May 5, 1966 edition of the Boston Globe indicated that RKO-owned WNAC-TV in Boston would not carry the game, the then-ABC-affiliated station did clear the broadcast at the last minute.

=== 1967 ===
For six seasons, from 1966–67 through 1971–72, CBS aired a game each week between mid-January until early-mid May in each of those seasons, mainly on a Sunday afternoon, including playoffs. Each American based franchise was paid US$100,000 annually for the first two years of the initial contract and $150,000 for the third. From 1968 to 1969 through 1971–72, the intermission studio was called "CBS Control," just like with its NFL coverage.

Due to prior programming commitments, CBS cannot broadcast regular season games during the 1966–67 season, so that portion of the package was subleased to RKO General, which syndicated eight regular-season games to some cities, including the four U.S. cities that then had NHL clubs and the six U.S. cities that would gain new teams in the 1967 expansion. RKO General aired series of Sunday afternoon broadcasts at 4 p.m. Eastern Time during the last eight weeks of the regular season, starting on February 12, 1967. However, these regular-season games were blacked out in the cities where they were played. For example, the March 26, 1967 game between the Boston Bruins and Montreal Canadiens in Boston was not televised on any station in the Boston area.

Except Game 2 of the Toronto-Chicago series, all of the Stanley Cup playoff games on CBC were televised in color. The 1967 playoffs were the first time CBC televised NHL games in color.

=== 1968 ===
CBS started its weekly 1967–68 coverage with the opening game (the Philadelphia Flyers vs. Los Angeles Kings) at The Forum in Inglewood, California on December 30. Then after three more Saturday afternoons, CBS switched to covering Sunday afternoon games beginning on January 28 for the next 10 weeks. Due to another strike by AFTRA (which resulted in the cancellation of a New York Rangers-Montreal broadcast), CBS started its playoff coverage with a CBC tape of the previous night's Boston-Montreal game. On April 13, CBS started its three-week-long weekend afternoon Stanley Cup coverage, ending with St. Louis-Montreal on May 11. For the playoffs, Jim Gordon worked play-by-play, and Stu Nahan worked color commentary and intermission interviews. During the regular season, the pair alternated roles each week. For instance, Gordon worked play-by-play on December 30 while Nahan worked play-by-play the next week.

=== 1969 ===
In 1968–69, CBS broadcast 13 regular season and five Stanley Cup playoff Sunday afternoon games. Dan Kelly did play-by-play while Bill Mazer did color commentary and intermission interviews.

== See also ==
- National Hockey League on television
- List of Canadian Stanley Cup Final television announcers
- List of American Stanley Cup Final television announcers
- List of Hockey Night in Canada commentators
- List of NHL All-Star Game broadcasters
