= 1965–66 Detroit Red Wings season =

National Hockey League team season

1965–66 Detroit Red Wings
- League: 4th NHL
- 1965–66 record: 31–27–12
- Home record: 20–8–7
- Road record: 11–19–5
- Goals for: 221
- Goals against: 194

Team information
- General manager: Sid Abel
- Coach: Sid Abel
- Captain: Alex Delvecchio
- Arena: Detroit Olympia

Team leaders
- Goals: Norm Ullman and Alex Delvecchio (31)
- Assists: Gordie Howe (46)
- Points: Gordie Howe (75)
- Penalty minutes: Bryan Watson (133)
- Wins: Roger Crozier (27)
- Goals against average: George Gardner (1.00)

The 1965–66 Detroit Red Wings season saw the Red Wings finish in fourth place in the National Hockey League (NHL) with a record of 31 wins, 27 losses, and 12 ties for 74 points. They defeated the Chicago Black Hawks in six games in the semifinals before falling to the Montreal Canadiens in the Stanley Cup Finals, also in six games. The Red Wings would not appear in the Finals again until the 1995 Finals.

== Regular season ==
=== Final standings ===
Pos	Team	Pld	W	L	T	GF	GA	GD	Pts
1	Montreal Canadiens	70	41	21	8	239	173	+66	90
2	Chicago Black Hawks	70	37	25	8	240	187	+53	82
3	Toronto Maple Leafs	70	34	25	11	208	187	+21	79
4	Detroit Red Wings	70	31	27	12	221	194	+27	74
5	Boston Bruins	70	21	43	6	174	275	−101	48
6	New York Rangers	70	18	41	11	195	261	−66	47

Source: National Hockey League

=== Record vs. opponents ===
1965–66 NHL Records
Team	BOS	CHI	DET	MTL	NYR	TOR
Boston	—	4–8–2	2–11–1	4–9–1	8–5–1	4–9–1
Chicago	8–4–2	—	11–1–2	4–8–2	9–4–1	5–8–1
Detroit	11–2–1	1–11–2	—	4–8–2	7–3–4	8–4–2
Montreal	9–4–1	8–4–2	8–4–2	—	12–2	5–7–2
New York	5–8–1	4–9–1	3–7–4	2–12	—	3–6–5
Toronto	9–4–1	8–5–1	4–8–2	7–5–2	6–3–5	—

== Schedule and results ==
1965–66 regular season
October

Game	Result	Date	Score	Opponent	Record
1	L	October 23, 1965	1–8	@ Montreal Canadiens (1965–66)	0–1–0
2	W	October 24, 1965	3–0	Toronto Maple Leafs (1965–66)	1–1–0
3	L	October 28, 1965	1–5	Chicago Black Hawks (1965–66)	1–2–0
4	L	October 30, 1965	3–4	@ Toronto Maple Leafs (1965–66)	1–3–0
5	T	October 31, 1965	2–2	Montreal Canadiens (1965–66)	1–3–1

November

Game	Result	Date	Score	Opponent	Record
6	W	November 4, 1965	8–1	Boston Bruins (1965–66)	2–3–1
7	L	November 7, 1965	2–3	@ New York Rangers (1965–66)	2–4–1
8	L	November 10, 1965	2–5	@ Chicago Black Hawks (1965–66)	2–5–1
9	T	November 11, 1965	3–3	New York Rangers (1965–66)	2–5–2
10	T	November 14, 1965	2–2	Montreal Canadiens (1965–66)	2–5–3
11	W	November 20, 1965	4–2	@ Boston Bruins (1965–66)	3–5–3
12	T	November 21, 1965	3–3	@ New York Rangers (1965–66)	3–5–4
13	L	November 23, 1965	2–3	Chicago Black Hawks (1965–66)	3–6–4
14	L	November 25, 1965	1–3	@ Chicago Black Hawks (1965–66)	3–7–4
15	L	November 27, 1965	2–3	@ Montreal Canadiens (1965–66)	3–8–4
16	W	November 28, 1965	5–3	@ Boston Bruins (1965–66)	4–8–4

December

Game	Result	Date	Score	Opponent	Record
17	W	December 2, 1965	10–2	Boston Bruins (1965–66)	5–8–4
18	W	December 4, 1965	5–3	@ Toronto Maple Leafs (1965–66)	6–8–4
19	W	December 5, 1965	5–1	Toronto Maple Leafs (1965–66)	7–8–4
20	W	December 9, 1965	7–3	New York Rangers (1965–66)	8–8–4
21	W	December 11, 1965	4–2	@ New York Rangers (1965–66)	9–8–4
22	W	December 12, 1965	5–3	@ Boston Bruins (1965–66)	10–8–4
23	L	December 15, 1965	3–5	@ Toronto Maple Leafs (1965–66)	10–9–4
24	W	December 16, 1965	2–0	Boston Bruins (1965–66)	11–9–4
25	W	December 18, 1965	3–1	Chicago Black Hawks (1965–66)	12–9–4
26	L	December 19, 1965	4–5	@ Chicago Black Hawks (1965–66)	12–10–4
27	W	December 23, 1965	4–2	New York Rangers (1965–66)	13–10–4
28	L	December 25, 1965	3–4	@ Montreal Canadiens (1965–66)	13–11–4
29	W	December 26, 1965	1–0	Montreal Canadiens (1965–66)	14–11–4
30	W	December 28, 1965	1–0	@ Boston Bruins (1965–66)	15–11–4
31	L	December 31, 1965	1–4	Chicago Black Hawks (1965–66)	15–12–4

January

Game	Result	Date	Score	Opponent	Record
32	W	January 2, 1966	4–0	Toronto Maple Leafs (1965–66)	16–12–4
33	W	January 6, 1966	5–3	Boston Bruins (1965–66)	17–12–4
34	W	January 8, 1966	3–1	@ Toronto Maple Leafs (1965–66)	18–12–4
35	W	January 9, 1966	4–2	Montreal Canadiens (1965–66)	19–12–4
36	T	January 15, 1966	4–4	New York Rangers (1965–66)	19–12–5
37	W	January 16, 1966	4–0	Toronto Maple Leafs (1965–66)	20–12–5
38	W	January 20, 1966	5–2	Montreal Canadiens (1965–66)	21–12–5
39	W	January 22, 1966	3–0	@ Montreal Canadiens (1965–66)	22–12–5
40	W	January 23, 1966	5–1	New York Rangers (1965–66)	23–12–5
41	L	January 26, 1966	3–4	@ New York Rangers (1965–66)	23–13–5
42	T	January 29, 1966	4–4	@ Chicago Black Hawks (1965–66)	23–13–6
43	L	January 30, 1966	1–5	Chicago Black Hawks (1965–66)	23–14–6

February

Game	Result	Date	Score	Opponent	Record
44	W	February 3, 1966	4–2	@ Boston Bruins (1965–66)	24–14–6
45	T	February 5, 1966	2–2	@ Montreal Canadiens (1965–66)	24–14–7
46	T	February 6, 1966	3–3	Boston Bruins (1965–66)	24–14–8
47	L	February 9, 1966	1–2	@ Chicago Black Hawks (1965–66)	24–15–8
48	W	February 10, 1966	6–2	New York Rangers (1965–66)	25–15–8
49	T	February 12, 1966	3–3	@ Toronto Maple Leafs (1965–66)	25–15–9
50	L	February 13, 1966	3–4	Montreal Canadiens (1965–66)	25–16–9
51	L	February 16, 1966	4–5	@ Boston Bruins (1965–66)	25–17–9
52	L	February 19, 1966	1–5	Boston Bruins (1965–66)	25–18–9
53	W	February 20, 1966	4–1	Toronto Maple Leafs (1965–66)	26–18–9
54	L	February 23, 1966	0–5	@ New York Rangers (1965–66)	26–19–9
55	L	February 26, 1966	1–4	Chicago Black Hawks (1965–66)	26–20–9
56	L	February 27, 1966	3–5	Montreal Canadiens (1965–66)	26–21–9

March

Game	Result	Date	Score	Opponent	Record
57	L	March 2, 1966	4–5	@ Chicago Black Hawks (1965–66)	26–22–9
58	L	March 5, 1966	2–7	@ Montreal Canadiens (1965–66)	26–23–9
59	T	March 6, 1966	1–1	@ New York Rangers (1965–66)	26–23–10
60	L	March 9, 1966	0–1	@ Toronto Maple Leafs (1965–66)	26–24–10
61	L	March 12, 1966	1–4	@ Montreal Canadiens (1965–66)	26–25–10
62	W	March 13, 1966	8–4	@ Boston Bruins (1965–66)	27–25–10
63	L	March 16, 1966	1–4	@ Chicago Black Hawks (1965–66)	27–26–10
64	W	March 17, 1966	4–2	Boston Bruins (1965–66)	28–26–10
65	W	March 20, 1966	6–1	Toronto Maple Leafs (1965–66)	29–26–10
66	W	March 23, 1966	2–1	@ New York Rangers (1965–66)	30–26–10
67	L	March 26, 1966	1–3	@ Toronto Maple Leafs (1965–66)	30–27–10
68	T	March 27, 1966	1–1	Chicago Black Hawks (1965–66)	30–27–11
69	W	March 31, 1966	5–3	New York Rangers (1965–66)	31–27–11

April

Game	Result	Date	Score	Opponent	Record
70	T	April 3, 1966	3–3	Toronto Maple Leafs (1965–66)	31–27–12

Legend: Win (2 points) Loss (0 points) Tie (1 point)

== Player statistics ==
=== Regular season ===
Scoring

Player	Pos	GP	G	A	Pts	PIM	PPG	SHG	GWG
Gordie Howe	RW	70	29	46	75	83	7	0	3
Norm Ullman	C	70	31	41	72	35	7	0	2
Alex Delvecchio	C/LW	70	31	38	69	16	9	4	6
Floyd Smith	RW	66	21	28	49	20	2	0	3
Andy Bathgate	RW	70	15	32	47	25	4	0	3
Paul Henderson	RW	69	22	24	46	34	5	0	9
Bruce MacGregor	C	70	20	14	34	28	1	1	2
Ab McDonald	LW	43	6	16	22	6	1	0	0
Doug Barkley	D	43	5	15	20	65	1	0	0
Gary Bergman	D	61	3	16	19	96	1	0	0
Bert Marshall	D	61	0	19	19	45	0	0	0
Ron Murphy	LW	32	10	7	17	10	2	0	1
Bill Gadsby	D	58	5	12	17	72	0	0	0
Parker MacDonald	C	37	5	12	17	24	0	0	0
Dean Prentice	LW	19	6	9	15	8	0	1	1
Val Fonteyne	LW	59	5	10	15	0	1	0	0
Bryan Watson	D	70	2	7	9	133	0	1	0
Don McKenney	C	24	1	6	7	0	0	0	0
Billy Harris	C	24	1	4	5	6	0	0	0
Leo Boivin	D	16	0	5	5	16	0	0	0
Warren Godfrey	D	26	0	4	4	22	0	0	0
Pit Martin	C	10	1	1	2	0	0	0	1
Jimmy Peters	C	6	1	1	2	2	1	0	0
Bob Wall	D	8	1	1	2	8	0	0	0
Pete Goegan	D	13	0	2	2	14	0	0	0
Bob McCord	D	9	0	2	2	16	0	0	0
Pete Mahovlich	C	3	0	1	1	0	0	0	0
Hank Bassen	G	11	0	0	0	0	0	0	0
Dwight Carruthers	D	1	0	0	0	0	0	0	0
Bart Crashley	D	1	0	0	0	0	0	0	0
Roger Crozier	G	64	0	0	0	4	0	0	0
Gary Doak	D	4	0	0	0	12	0	0	0
George Gardner	G	1	0	0	0	0	0	0	0
Murray Hall	RW	1	0	0	0	0	0	0	0
Doug Roberts	RW	1	0	0	0	0	0	0	0
Jim Watson	D	2	0	0	0	4	0	0	0

Goaltending

Player	MIN	GP	W	L	T	GA	GAA	SO
Roger Crozier	3734	64	27	24	12	173	2.78	7
Hank Bassen	406	11	3	3	0	17	2.51	0
George Gardner	60	1	1	0	0	1	1.00	0
Team:	4200	70	31	27	12	191	2.73	7

=== Playoffs ===
Scoring

Player	Pos	GP	G	A	Pts	PIM	PPG	SHG	GWG
Norm Ullman	C	12	6	9	15	12			
Alex Delvecchio	C/LW	12	0	11	11	4			
Dean Prentice	LW	12	5	5	10	4			
Gordie Howe	RW	12	4	6	10	12			
Andy Bathgate	RW	12	6	3	9	6			
Floyd Smith	RW	12	5	2	7	4			
Paul Henderson	RW	12	3	3	6	10			
Bruce MacGregor	C	12	1	4	5	2			
Ab McDonald	LW	10	1	4	5	2			
Bill Gadsby	D	12	1	3	4	12			
Bert Marshall	D	12	1	3	4	16			
Gary Bergman	D	12	0	3	3	14			
Bryan Watson	D	12	2	0	2	30			
Val Fonteyne	LW	12	1	0	1	4			
Leo Boivin	D	12	0	1	1	16			
Hank Bassen	G	1	0	0	0	0			
Roger Crozier	G	12	0	0	0	0			
Warren Godfrey	D	4	0	0	0	0			
Pete Goegan	D	1	0	0	0	0			
Murray Hall	RW	1	0	0	0	0			
Parker MacDonald	C	9	0	0	0	2			
Irv Spencer	D	3	0	0	0	2			
Bob Wall	D	6	0	0	0	2			

Goaltending

Player	MIN	GP	W	L	GA	GAA	SO
Roger Crozier	668	12	6	5	26	2.34	1
Hank Bassen	54	1	0	1	2	2.22	0
Team:	722	12	6	6	28	2.33	1

Note: GP = Games played; G = Goals; A = Assists; Pts = Points; +/- = Plus-minus PIM = Penalty minutes; PPG = Power-play goals; SHG = Short-handed goals; GWG = Game-winning goals;
MIN = Minutes played; W = Wins; L = Losses; T = Ties; GA = Goals against; GAA = Goals-against average; SO = Shutouts;

== Draft picks ==
Detroit's draft picks at the 1965 NHL amateur draft held at the Queen Elizabeth Hotel in Montreal.

Round	#	Player	Nationality	College/Junior/Club team (League)
1	3	George Forgie	Canada	Flin Flon Bombers (SJHL)
2	8	Bob Birdsell	Canada	Stettler Midgets (MAAAMHL)
