= 1966 Stanley Cup Final =

1966 ice hockey championship series

	1	2	3	4	5	6	Total
Detroit Red Wings	3	5	2	1	1	2*	2
Montreal Canadiens	2	2	4	2	5	3*	4
- * – Denotes overtime period(s)
- Location(s): Montreal: Montreal Forum (1, 2, 5); Detroit: Olympia Stadium (3, 4, 6)
- Coaches: Montreal: Toe Blake; Detroit: Sid Abel
- Captains: Montreal: Jean Beliveau; Detroit: Alex Delvecchio
- Dates: April 24 – May 5, 1966
- MVP: Roger Crozier (Red Wings)
- Series-winning goal: Henri Richard (2:20, OT)
- Hall of Famers: Canadiens: Jean Beliveau (1972); Yvan Cournoyer (1982); Dick Duff (2006); Jacques Laperriere (1987; did not play); Henri Richard (1979); Gump Worsley (1980); Red Wings: Andy Bathgate (1978); Leo Boivin (1986); Alex Delvecchio (1977); Bill Gadsby (1970); Gordie Howe (1972); Norm Ullman (1982); Coaches: Sid Abel (1969, player); Toe Blake (1966, player); Officials: Josh Ashley (1981); Neil Armstrong (1991); John D'Amico (1993); Matt Pavelich (1987); Frank Udvari (1973)

The 1966 Stanley Cup Final was the championship series of the National Hockey League's (NHL) 1965–66 season, and the culmination of the 1966 Stanley Cup playoffs. It was contested by the Detroit Red Wings and the defending champion Montreal Canadiens. This was the fifth Detroit–Montreal series; they previously met in 1952, 1954, 1955, and 1956, with the Red Wings winning the former three and the Canadiens winning the latter. The Canadiens defeated the Red Wings in six games to win the Stanley Cup for the seventh time in eleven years. This was the last Cup Final appearance for the Red Wings until 1995.

== Paths to the Final ==
Montreal defeated the Toronto Maple Leafs 4–0 to advance to the Final, and Detroit defeated the Chicago Black Hawks 4–2.

== Game summaries ==
The Montreal Canadiens were the defending champions in their twenty-second Stanley Cup Finals, after winning their thirteenth championship the previous year with a seven-game victory over the Chicago Black Hawks. This was the Detroit Red Wings' eighteenth Stanley Cup Finals, having won seven championships previously. Their most recent Finals came in 1964, when they lost to the Toronto Maple Leafs in seven games. This was the eleventh playoff series between these two teams, with Detroit winning seven of their ten previous series. Their most recent series had come in the 1958 semifinals, where Montreal won in a four-game sweep. Montreal won eighteen of twenty-eight points in this year's regular season series. Detroit would not return to the Stanley Cup Finals again until 1995. Toe Blake had coached the Canadiens to seven Cups in eleven years.

=== Game one ===
April 24	Detroit Red Wings	3–2	Montreal Canadiens	Montreal Forum	Recap

In game one, Roger Crozier made 33 saves in net for Detroit, and Paul Henderson scored the game winning goal early in the third period to win the game 3–2, giving the Red Wings a 1–0 series lead.

Scoring summary
Period	Team	Goal	Assist(s)	Time	Score
1st	DET	Floyd Smith (3)	Andy Bathgate (1)	13:25	1–0 DET
2nd	MTL	Ralph Backstrom (2)	J. C. Tremblay (5)	04:23	1–1
2nd	DET	Bill Gadsby (1)	Ab McDonald (3)	05:14	2–1 DET
3rd	MTL	Paul Henderson (3)	Bert Marshall (2)	02:14	3–1 DET
3rd	DET	Terry Harper (2)	Bobby Rousseau (3)	02:36	3–2 DET
Penalty summary
Period	Team	Player	Penalty	Time	PIM
1st	DET	Bill Gadsby	Interference	00:35	2:00
1st	MTL	Ted Harris	Interference	09:10	2:00
1st	DET	Andy Bathgate	Hooking	09:26	2:00
2nd	None				
3rd	None				

Shots by period
Team	1	2	3	Total
Detroit	9	10	16	35
Montreal	10	11	14	35

=== Game two ===
April 26	Detroit Red Wings	5–2	Montreal Canadiens	Montreal Forum	Recap

In game two, Detroit defeated Montreal by a score of 5–2, to take a 2–0 series lead back home.

Scoring summary
Period	Team	Goal	Assist(s)	Time	Score
1st	MTL	J. C. Tremblay (2) – pp	Jean Beliveau (4) and Yvan Cournoyer (3)	06:55	1–0 MTL
1st	DET	Andy Bathgate (6) – pp	Dean Prentice (5) and Norm Ullman (8)	18:39	1–1
2nd	None				
3rd	DET	Bruce MacGregor (1)	Paul Henderson (1) and Norm Ullman (9)	01:51	2–1 DET
3rd	DET	Ab McDonald (1)	Bill Gadsby (3) and Floyd Smith (2)	02:45	3–1 DET
3rd	MTL	Yvan Cournoyer (1)	Terry Harper (2) and Noel Price (1)	12:00	3–2 DET
3rd	DET	Floyd Smith (4)	Andy Bathgate (2)	12:28	4–2 DET
3rd	DET	Dean Prentice (5)	Alex Delvecchio (9)	16:25	5–2 DET
Penalty summary
Period	Team	Player	Penalty	Time	PIM
1st	MTL	Dick Duff	Cross-checking	03:01	2:00
1st	DET	Andy Bathgate	Elbowing	05:30	2:00
1st	DET	Paul Henderson	Tripping	10:18	2:00
1st	MTL	Bobby Rousseau	Hooking	14:11	2:00
1st	MTL	John Ferguson	Interference	17:06	2:00
2nd	DET	Leo Boivin	Slashing	03:01	2:00
2nd	MTL	Jean-Guy Talbot	Boarding	05:22	2:00
2nd	DET	Bruce MacGregor	Tripping	08:55	2:00
2nd	DET	Bryan Watson	Cross-checking	10:26	2:00
2nd	MTL	Henri Richard	Roughing	10:26	2:00
2nd	DET	Bryan Watson	Hooking	12:50	2:00
2nd	MTL	Terry Harper	High-sticking	17:09	2:00
3rd	MTL	Jean-Guy Talbot	Slashing	03:49	2:00
3rd	DET	Norm Ullman	Cross-checking	17:24	2:00
3rd	MTL	John Ferguson	Cross-checking	17:24	2:00

Shots by period
Team	1	2	3	Total
Detroit	14	7	13	34
Montreal	7	6	12	25

=== Game three ===
April 28	Montreal Canadiens	4–2	Detroit Red Wings	Detroit Olympia	Recap

Gilles Tremblay scored twice for the Canadiens in a 4–2 over the Red Wings in game three to cut the series lead in half.

Scoring summary
Period	Team	Goal	Assist(s)	Time	Score
1st	DET	Norm Ullman (3)	Unassisted	04:20	1–0 DET
1st	MTL	Dave Balon (1)	Terry Harper (3) and Henri Richard (1)	15:40	1–1
1st	MTL	Jean Beliveau (3)	Unassisted	19:12	2–1 MTL
2nd	None				
3rd	MTL	Gilles Tremblay (3)	Jean Beliveau (5)	01:45	3–1 MTL
3rd	MTL	Gilles Tremblay (4) – pp	J. C. Tremblay (6) and Bobby Rousseau (4)	03:21	4–1 MTL
3rd	DET	Gordie Howe (4)	Alex Delvecchio (10) and Bert Marshall (3)	19:59	4–2 MTL
Penalty summary
1st	MTL	Ralph Backstrom	Elbowing	08:38	2:00
2nd	MTL	Leon Rochefort	High-sticking	02:46	2:00
2nd	DET	Gordie Howe	High-sticking	05:20	2:00
2nd	DET	Dean Prentice	Tripping	11:31	2:00
2nd	DET	Bryan Watson	Charging	18:23	2:00
2nd	MTL	Dave Balon	Misconduct	18:23	10:00
3rd	DET	Bert Marshall	Holding	03:03	2:00
3rd	DET	Norm Ullman	High-sticking	10:14	2:00
3rd	MTL	Dave Balon	Tripping	10:14	2:00
3rd	MTL	Jean-Guy Talbot	Interference	13:24	2:00
3rd	DET	Bench (served by Ab McDonald)	Too many men on the ice	16:50	2:00

Shots by period
Team	1	2	3	Total
Montreal	9	9	13	31
Detroit	9	15	7	31

=== Game four ===
May 1	Montreal Canadiens	2–1	Detroit Red Wings	Detroit Olympia	Recap

Roger Crozier was injured in the opening five minutes and forty-eight seconds into game four and had to be replaced by backup Hank Bassen. After a scoreless first, Norm Ullman opened the scoring for the Red Wings, and Jean Beliveau tied the game with nine seconds remaining in the second period. Ralph Backstrom scored the game winning goal in the third, and Gump Worsley made a total of 22 saves to give the Canadiens a 2–1 victory to tie the series.

Scoring summary
Period	Team	Goal	Assist(s)	Time	Score
1st	None				
2nd	DET	Norm Ullman (4)	Brad MacGregor (4) and Paul Henderson (2)	11:24	1–0 DET
2nd	MTL	Jean Beliveau (4) – pp	Dick Duff (3) and J. C. Tremblay (7)	19:51	1–1
3rd	MTL	Ralph Backstrom (3)	Dick Duff (4) and Jim Roberts (1)	13:37	2–1 MTL
Penalty summary
1st	DET	Parker MacDonald	Tripping	04:25	2:00
1st	DET	Norm Ullman	Cross-checking	10:15	2:00
1st	MTL	John Ferguson	High-sticking	13:21	2:00
1st	DET	Gordie Howe	Elbowing	14:52	2:00
2nd	DET	Bryan Watson	Charging	07:44	2:00
2nd	MTL	Terry Harper	Tripping	12:11	2:00
2nd	DET	Gordie Howe	Interference	18:23	2:00
3rd	MTL	John Ferguson	Holding	04:33	2:00
3rd	DET	Gary Bergman	Roughing	16:36	2:00
3rd	MTL	Claude Provost	Elbowing	16:36	2:00

Shots by period
Team	1	2	3	Total
Montreal	12	13	8	33
Detroit	5	9	9	23

=== Game five ===
May 3	Detroit Red Wings	1–5	Montreal Canadiens	Montreal Forum	Recap

In game five, Roger Crozier returned to the lineup for the Red Wings. Montreal defeated Detroit by a score of 5–1 on their home ice, giving them a 3–2 series lead, needing just one more victory to clinch the series and win the Stanley Cup.

Scoring summary
Period	Team	Goal	Assist(s)	Time	Score
1st	MTL	Claude Provost (2)	Ralph Backstrom (3) and J. C. Tremblay (8)	01:06	1–0 MTL
1st	MTL	Yvan Cournoyer (2) – pp	J. C. Tremblay (9) and Gilles Tremblay (4)	19:21	2–0 MTL
2nd	MTL	Dave Balon (2)	Henri Richard (2) and Leon Rochefort (1)	01:05	3–0 MTL
2nd	MTL	Bobby Rousseau (4)	Dick Duff (5) and Ralph Backstrom (4)	11:22	4–0 MTL
2nd	DET	Norm Ullman (5)	Paul Henderson (3) and Andy Bathgate (3)	14:22	4–1 MTL
3rd	MTL	Dick Duff (2)	Henri Richard (3)	05:31	5–1 MTL
Penalty summary
Period	Team	Player	Penalty	Time	PIM
1st	MTL	Jean-Guy Talbot	Hooking	05:51	2:00
1st	DET	Paul Henderson	Interference	18:07	2:00
2nd	DET	Gary Bergman	Elbowing	02:44	2:00
2nd	DET	Bob Wall	Tripping	05:03	2:00
2nd	MTL	Bobby Rousseau	Hooking	06:25	2:00
2nd	MTL	Dave Balon	Holding	12:21	2:00
2nd	DET	Bert Marshall	Holding	16:42	2:00
3rd	DET	Bert Marshall	Holding	07:49	2:00
3rd	MTL	Leon Rochefort	Slashing	13:17	2:00
3rd	DET	Leo Boivin	Slashing	17:12	2:00

Shots by period
Team	1	2	3	Total
Detroit	8	5	8	21
Montreal	13	15	5	33

=== Game six ===
May 5	Montreal Canadiens	3–2	OT	Detroit Red Wings	Detroit Olympia	Recap

Henri Richard, a member of all seven championship teams, would score his first goal of the playoffs in game six to win the series in overtime. Two minutes into the extra period, Richard broke in on Red Wing goalie Roger Crozier, lost his footing on the newly resurfaced ice as he cut across the goalmouth, and sprawled into Crozier. The puck went in, and even though Crozier and the Wings protested that Richard had pushed the puck in with his hand, the goal stood. His brilliant play in goal, even in defeat, earned Crozier the Conn Smythe Trophy as the most valuable player in the playoffs, becoming the first player to win the award as a member of the losing team.

Scoring summary
Period	Team	Goal	Assist(s)	Time	Score
1st	MTL	Jean Beliveau (5)	Gilles Tremblay (3) and Claude Provost (3)	09:08	1–0 MTL
2nd	MTL	Leon Rochefort (1)	Henri Richard (4) and Dave Balon (2)	10:11	2–0 MTL
2nd	DET	Norm Ullman (6)	Alex Delvecchio (11) and Gordie Howe (6)	11:55	2–1 MTL
3rd	DET	Floyd Smith (5)	Gary Bergman (3) and Ab McDonald (4)	10:30	2–2
OT	MTL	Henri Richard (1)	Dave Balon (3) and Jean-Guy Talbot (2)	02:20	3–2 MTL
Penalty summary
1st	DET	Bryan Watson	Hooking	11:15	2:00
1st	MTL	Dave Balon	Slashing	15:04	2:00
2nd	DET	Leo Boivin	Charging	00:23	2:00
2nd	DET	Bert Marshall	Holding	07:13	2:00
2nd	MTL	Ted Harris	Interference	10:42	2:00
2nd	MTL	Jim Roberts	Misconduct	11:55	10:00
2nd	DET	Bryan Watson	Hooking	12:18	2:00
2nd	DET	Ab McDonald	Tripping	16:42	2:00
3rd	None				
OT	None				

Shots by period
Team	1	2	3	OT	Total
Montreal	5	6	9	2	22
Detroit	10	9	10	1	30

== Stanley Cup engraving ==
The 1966 Stanley Cup was presented to Canadiens captain Jean Beliveau by NHL President Clarence Campbell following the Canadiens 3–2 win over the Red Wings in game six.

The following Canadiens players and staff had their names engraved on the Stanley Cup

1965–66 Montreal Canadiens

=== Players ===
Centres

- 4 Jean Beliveau (Captain)
- 6 Ralph Backstrom
- 16 Henri Richard (A)
- 18 Leon Rochefort

Wingers

- 8 Dick Duff
- 12 Yvan Cournoyer
- 11 Claude Larose
- 14 Claude Provost
- 15 Bobby Rousseau
- 20 David Balon
- 21 Gilles Tremblay
- 22 John Ferguson Sr.
- 26 Jim Roberts

Defencemen

- 2 Jacques Laperriere
- 3 Jean-Claude J. C. Tremblay
- 10 Edward Ted Harris
- 17 Jean-Guy Talbot (A)
- 19 Terry Harper
- 23 Noel Price

Goaltenders

- 1 Charlie Hodge
- 30 Lorne Gump Worsley

=== Coaching and administrative staff ===
- Hartland Molson (Chairman/owner), J. David Molson (President)
- Sam Pollock (Vice President/Manager), Hector Toe Blake (Coach)
- Andy Galley (Trainer), Larry Albut (Asst. Trainer)

=== Stanley Cup engravings ===
- Montreal Canadiens name was misspelt MONTREAL CANADIENE. This mistake was later corrected on the Replica Cup created in 1992–93.

== Broadcasting ==
In 1966, NBC became the first television network in the United States to air a national broadcast of a Stanley Cup Playoff game. The network provided coverage of four Sunday afternoon playoff games during the 1965–66 postseason. On April 10 and April 17, NBC aired semifinal games between the Chicago Black Hawks and the Detroit Red Wings. On April 24, and May 1, NBC aired Games 1 and 4 of the Stanley Cup Final between the Montreal Canadiens and the Detroit Red Wings. Win Elliot served as the play-by-play man while Bill Mazer served as the color commentator for the games.

NBC's coverage of the 1966 Stanley Cup Final marked the first time that hockey games were broadcast on network television in color. The CBC would follow suit the following year. NBC's Stanley Cup coverage preempted a sports anthology series called NBC Sports in Action, hosted by Jim Simpson and Bill Cullen, who were between-periods co-hosts for the Stanley Cup broadcasts.

== Aftermath ==
The next season, the Red Wings finished a distant fifth, 24 points out of the playoffs, marking the beginning of a 20 year slump known as the "Dead Wings" era. The Red Wings only made the playoffs four times in the next 20 years between 1967 and 1986, and would not return to the Stanley Cup Final again until 1995, where they were swept by the New Jersey Devils.

The Canadiens would return to the Stanley Cup Final the next season, but lost to the Toronto Maple Leafs in six games. However, the Canadiens would eventually become a dynasty, winning the Stanley Cup in 1968, 1969, 1971, 1973, 1976, 1977, 1978, and 1979.

== See also ==
- 1965–66 NHL season

== Notes ==
Preceded by Montreal Canadiens; 1965	Montreal Canadiens; Stanley Cup champions 1966	Succeeded by Toronto Maple Leafs; 1967
