= 1965–66 Boston Bruins season =

NHL team season

1965–66 Boston Bruins
- League: 5th NHL
- 1965–66 record: 21–43–6
- Home record: 15–17–3
- Road record: 6–26–3
- Goals for: 174
- Goals against: 275

Team information
- General manager: Hap Emms
- Coach: Milt Schmidt
- Captain: Leo Boivin
- Alternate captains: Johnny Bucyk; Ted Green; Murray Oliver
- Arena: Boston Garden

Team leaders
- Goals: John Bucyk (27)
- Assists: Murray Oliver (42)
- Points: Murray Oliver (60)
- Penalty minutes: Ted Green (113)
- Wins: Bernie Parent (11))
- Goals against average: Bernie Parent (3.69)

The 1965–66 Boston Bruins season was the Bruins' 42nd season in the NHL The Bruins missed the playoffs for the seventh consecutive season for the first time in franchise history.

== Regular season ==
=== Final standings ===
| Pos | Team | Pld | W | L | T | GF | GA | GD | Pts |
|---|---|---|---|---|---|---|---|---|---|
| 1 | Montreal Canadiens | 70 | 41 | 21 | 8 | 239 | 173 | +66 | 90 |
| 2 | Chicago Black Hawks | 70 | 37 | 25 | 8 | 240 | 187 | +53 | 82 |
| 3 | Toronto Maple Leafs | 70 | 34 | 25 | 11 | 208 | 187 | +21 | 79 |
| 4 | Detroit Red Wings | 70 | 31 | 27 | 12 | 221 | 194 | +27 | 74 |
| 5 | Boston Bruins | 70 | 21 | 43 | 6 | 174 | 275 | −101 | 48 |
| 6 | New York Rangers | 70 | 18 | 41 | 11 | 195 | 261 | −66 | 47 |

Source: National Hockey League

=== Record vs. opponents ===
1965–66 NHL Records
| Team | BOS | CHI | DET | MTL | NYR | TOR |
|---|---|---|---|---|---|---|
| Boston | — | 4–8–2 | 2–11–1 | 4–9–1 | 8–5–1 | 4–9–1 |
| Chicago | 8–4–2 | — | 11–1–2 | 4–8–2 | 9–4–1 | 5–8–1 |
| Detroit | 11–2–1 | 1–11–2 | — | 4–8–2 | 7–3–4 | 8–4–2 |
| Montreal | 9–4–1 | 8–4–2 | 8–4–2 | — | 12–2 | 5–7–2 |
| New York | 5–8–1 | 4–9–1 | 3–7–4 | 2–12 | — | 3–6–5 |
| Toronto | 9–4–1 | 8–5–1 | 4–8–2 | 7–5–2 | 6–3–5 | — |

== Schedule and results ==
1965–66 regular season
October

| Game | Result | Date | Score | Opponent | Record |
|---|---|---|---|---|---|
| 1 | L | October 24, 1965 | 2–6 | Chicago Black Hawks (1965–66) | 0–1–0 |
| 2 | L | October 27, 1965 | 1–2 | Toronto Maple Leafs (1965–66) | 0–2–0 |
| 3 | L | October 30, 1965 | 2–8 | New York Rangers (1965–66) | 0–3–0 |

November

| Game | Result | Date | Score | Opponent | Record |
|---|---|---|---|---|---|
| 4 | T | November 3, 1965 | 2–2 | @ Chicago Black Hawks (1965–66) | 0–3–1 |
| 5 | L | November 4, 1965 | 1–8 | @ Detroit Red Wings (1965–66) | 0–4–1 |
| 6 | W | November 6, 1965 | 3–1 | @ Montreal Canadiens (1965–66) | 1–4–1 |
| 7 | L | November 7, 1965 | 2–5 | Montreal Canadiens (1965–66) | 1–5–1 |
| 8 | T | November 10, 1965 | 2–2 | @ New York Rangers (1965–66) | 1–5–2 |
| 9 | W | November 14, 1965 | 2–0 | Toronto Maple Leafs (1965–66) | 2–5–2 |
| 10 | L | November 20, 1965 | 2–4 | Detroit Red Wings (1965–66) | 2–6–2 |
| 11 | W | November 21, 1965 | 3–2 | Montreal Canadiens (1965–66) | 3–6–2 |
| 12 | L | November 24, 1965 | 1–4 | @ New York Rangers (1965–66) | 3–7–2 |
| 13 | W | November 25, 1965 | 6–2 | New York Rangers (1965–66) | 4–7–2 |
| 14 | W | November 27, 1965 | 2–1 | @ Toronto Maple Leafs (1965–66) | 5–7–2 |
| 15 | L | November 28, 1965 | 3–5 | Detroit Red Wings (1965–66) | 5–8–2 |

December

| Game | Result | Date | Score | Opponent | Record |
|---|---|---|---|---|---|
| 16 | L | December 1, 1965 | 2–4 | @ Chicago Black Hawks (1965–66) | 5–9–2 |
| 17 | L | December 2, 1965 | 2–10 | @ Detroit Red Wings (1965–66) | 5–10–2 |
| 18 | L | December 4, 1965 | 1–10 | Chicago Black Hawks (1965–66) | 5–11–2 |
| 19 | T | December 5, 1965 | 4–4 | Montreal Canadiens (1965–66) | 5–11–3 |
| 20 | L | December 8, 1965 | 3–8 | @ Montreal Canadiens (1965–66) | 5–12–3 |
| 21 | L | December 11, 1965 | 3–8 | @ Toronto Maple Leafs (1965–66) | 5–13–3 |
| 22 | L | December 12, 1965 | 3–5 | Detroit Red Wings (1965–66) | 5–14–3 |
| 23 | L | December 15, 1965 | 4–8 | @ Chicago Black Hawks (1965–66) | 5–15–3 |
| 24 | L | December 16, 1965 | 0–2 | @ Detroit Red Wings (1965–66) | 5–16–3 |
| 25 | L | December 18, 1965 | 1–2 | @ Montreal Canadiens (1965–66) | 5–17–3 |
| 26 | L | December 19, 1965 | 1–3 | Toronto Maple Leafs (1965–66) | 5–18–3 |
| 27 | W | December 25, 1965 | 4–2 | New York Rangers (1965–66) | 6–18–3 |
| 28 | L | December 26, 1965 | 4–6 | @ New York Rangers (1965–66) | 6–19–3 |
| 29 | L | December 28, 1965 | 0–1 | Detroit Red Wings (1965–66) | 6–20–3 |

January

| Game | Result | Date | Score | Opponent | Record |
|---|---|---|---|---|---|
| 30 | L | January 1, 1966 | 3–6 | @ Toronto Maple Leafs (1965–66) | 6–21–3 |
| 31 | L | January 2, 1966 | 1–3 | @ Chicago Black Hawks (1965–66) | 6–22–3 |
| 32 | L | January 6, 1966 | 3–5 | @ Detroit Red Wings (1965–66) | 6–23–3 |
| 33 | L | January 8, 1966 | 0–6 | @ Montreal Canadiens (1965–66) | 6–24–3 |
| 34 | W | January 9, 1966 | 3–1 | @ New York Rangers (1965–66) | 7–24–3 |
| 35 | T | January 13, 1966 | 1–1 | Chicago Black Hawks (1965–66) | 7–24–4 |
| 36 | L | January 15, 1966 | 1–6 | @ Toronto Maple Leafs (1965–66) | 7–25–4 |
| 37 | L | January 16, 1966 | 1–3 | Montreal Canadiens (1965–66) | 7–26–4 |
| 38 | W | January 20, 1966 | 4–3 | Chicago Black Hawks (1965–66) | 8–26–4 |
| 39 | W | January 22, 1966 | 5–3 | New York Rangers (1965–66) | 9–26–4 |
| 40 | W | January 23, 1966 | 2–1 | Toronto Maple Leafs (1965–66) | 10–26–4 |
| 41 | W | January 27, 1966 | 5–3 | Chicago Black Hawks (1965–66) | 11–26–4 |
| 42 | L | January 29, 1966 | 3–6 | @ Toronto Maple Leafs (1965–66) | 11–27–4 |
| 43 | L | January 30, 1966 | 1–3 | Montreal Canadiens (1965–66) | 11–28–4 |

February

| Game | Result | Date | Score | Opponent | Record |
|---|---|---|---|---|---|
| 44 | L | February 3, 1966 | 2–4 | Detroit Red Wings (1965–66) | 11–29–4 |
| 45 | W | February 5, 1966 | 5–3 | New York Rangers (1965–66) | 12–29–4 |
| 46 | T | February 6, 1966 | 3–3 | @ Detroit Red Wings (1965–66) | 12–29–5 |
| 47 | W | February 10, 1966 | 2–0 | Montreal Canadiens (1965–66) | 13–29–5 |
| 48 | L | February 12, 1966 | 2–9 | @ New York Rangers (1965–66) | 13–30–5 |
| 49 | T | February 13, 1966 | 4–4 | Toronto Maple Leafs (1965–66) | 13–30–6 |
| 50 | W | February 16, 1966 | 5–4 | Detroit Red Wings (1965–66) | 14–30–6 |
| 51 | W | February 19, 1966 | 5–1 | @ Detroit Red Wings (1965–66) | 15–30–6 |
| 52 | L | February 20, 1966 | 1–5 | @ Chicago Black Hawks (1965–66) | 15–31–6 |
| 53 | L | February 23, 1966 | 2–3 | @ Montreal Canadiens (1965–66) | 15–32–6 |
| 54 | L | February 26, 1966 | 2–3 | @ Toronto Maple Leafs (1965–66) | 15–33–6 |
| 55 | L | February 27, 1966 | 1–7 | @ Chicago Black Hawks (1965–66) | 15–34–6 |

March

| Game | Result | Date | Score | Opponent | Record |
|---|---|---|---|---|---|
| 56 | L | March 2, 1966 | 3–5 | @ New York Rangers (1965–66) | 15–35–6 |
| 57 | L | March 3, 1966 | 4–5 | New York Rangers (1965–66) | 15–36–6 |
| 58 | L | March 6, 1966 | 3–5 | Toronto Maple Leafs (1965–66) | 15–37–6 |
| 59 | W | March 9, 1966 | 3–1 | @ Montreal Canadiens (1965–66) | 16–37–6 |
| 60 | L | March 12, 1966 | 0–6 | @ Toronto Maple Leafs (1965–66) | 16–38–6 |
| 61 | L | March 13, 1966 | 4–8 | Detroit Red Wings (1965–66) | 16–39–6 |
| 62 | W | March 16, 1966 | 3–1 | @ New York Rangers (1965–66) | 17–39–6 |
| 63 | L | March 17, 1966 | 2–4 | @ Detroit Red Wings (1965–66) | 17–40–6 |
| 64 | W | March 20, 1966 | 4–3 | New York Rangers (1965–66) | 18–40–6 |
| 65 | W | March 23, 1966 | 3–1 | Chicago Black Hawks (1965–66) | 19–40–6 |
| 66 | L | March 26, 1966 | 2–5 | @ Montreal Canadiens (1965–66) | 19–41–6 |
| 67 | L | March 27, 1966 | 1–3 | Montreal Canadiens (1965–66) | 19–42–6 |
| 68 | L | March 29, 1966 | 2–4 | @ Chicago Black Hawks (1965–66) | 19–43–6 |
| 69 | W | March 31, 1966 | 3–1 | Toronto Maple Leafs (1965–66) | 20–43–6 |

April

| Game | Result | Date | Score | Opponent | Record |
|---|---|---|---|---|---|
| 70 | W | April 3, 1966 | 4–2 | Chicago Black Hawks (1965–66) | 21–43–6 |

Legend: Win (2 points) Loss (0 points) Tie (1 point)

== Player statistics ==
=== Regular season ===
Scoring

| Player | Pos | GP | G | A | Pts | PIM | PPG | SHG | GWG |
|---|---|---|---|---|---|---|---|---|---|
| Murray Oliver | C | 70 | 18 | 42 | 60 | 30 | 5 | 0 | 3 |
| John Bucyk | LW | 63 | 27 | 30 | 57 | 12 | 3 | 0 | 5 |
| Tommy Williams | RW | 70 | 16 | 22 | 38 | 31 | 1 | 0 | 3 |
| Ron Stewart | RW | 70 | 20 | 16 | 36 | 17 | 4 | 0 | 2 |
| Ed Westfall | D/RW | 59 | 9 | 21 | 30 | 42 | 2 | 1 | 0 |
| Dean Prentice | LW | 50 | 7 | 22 | 29 | 10 | 3 | 0 | 1 |
| Pit Martin | C | 41 | 16 | 11 | 27 | 10 | 2 | 0 | 1 |
| John McKenzie | RW | 36 | 13 | 9 | 22 | 36 | 2 | 0 | 1 |
| Bob Dillabough | C | 53 | 7 | 13 | 20 | 18 | 0 | 0 | 1 |
| Gilles Marotte | D | 51 | 3 | 17 | 20 | 52 | 2 | 0 | 0 |
| Bob Woytowich | D | 68 | 2 | 17 | 19 | 75 | 0 | 0 | 1 |
| Ted Green | D | 27 | 5 | 13 | 18 | 113 | 2 | 0 | 0 |
| Albert Langlois | D | 65 | 4 | 10 | 14 | 54 | 0 | 0 | 0 |
| Parker MacDonald | C | 29 | 6 | 4 | 10 | 6 | 1 | 1 | 0 |
| Reggie Fleming | D/LW | 34 | 4 | 6 | 10 | 42 | 0 | 0 | 1 |
| Forbes Kennedy | C | 50 | 4 | 6 | 10 | 55 | 0 | 1 | 1 |
| Gary Doak | D | 20 | 0 | 8 | 8 | 28 | 0 | 0 | 0 |
| Don Awrey | D | 70 | 4 | 3 | 7 | 74 | 2 | 0 | 0 |
| Leo Boivin | D | 46 | 0 | 5 | 5 | 34 | 0 | 0 | 0 |
| Bill Goldsworthy | RW | 13 | 3 | 1 | 4 | 6 | 0 | 0 | 0 |
| Ron Schock | C | 24 | 2 | 2 | 4 | 6 | 1 | 0 | 0 |
| Wayne Maxner | LW | 8 | 1 | 3 | 4 | 6 | 0 | 0 | 0 |
| Bobby Leiter | C | 9 | 2 | 1 | 3 | 2 | 0 | 0 | 0 |
| Barry Ashbee | D | 14 | 0 | 3 | 3 | 14 | 0 | 0 | 0 |
| Wayne Rivers | RW | 2 | 1 | 1 | 2 | 2 | 0 | 0 | 1 |
| Gary Dornhoefer | RW | 10 | 0 | 1 | 1 | 2 | 0 | 0 | 0 |
| Ron Murphy | LW | 2 | 0 | 1 | 1 | 0 | 0 | 0 | 0 |
| Poul Popiel | D | 3 | 0 | 1 | 1 | 2 | 0 | 0 | 0 |
| John Arbour | D | 2 | 0 | 0 | 0 | 0 | 0 | 0 | 0 |
| Gerry Cheevers | G | 7 | 0 | 0 | 0 | 0 | 0 | 0 | 0 |
| Terry Crisp | C | 3 | 0 | 0 | 0 | 0 | 0 | 0 | 0 |
| Murray Davison | D | 1 | 0 | 0 | 0 | 0 | 0 | 0 | 0 |
| Eddie Johnston | G | 33 | 0 | 0 | 0 | 2 | 0 | 0 | 0 |
| Skip Krake | C | 2 | 0 | 0 | 0 | 0 | 0 | 0 | 0 |
| Don Marcotte | LW | 1 | 0 | 0 | 0 | 0 | 0 | 0 | 0 |
| Bernie Parent | G | 39 | 0 | 0 | 0 | 4 | 0 | 0 | 0 |
| J.P. Parise | LW | 3 | 0 | 0 | 0 | 0 | 0 | 0 | 0 |
| Bob Ring | G | 1 | 0 | 0 | 0 | 0 | 0 | 0 | 0 |
| Derek Sanderson | C | 2 | 0 | 0 | 0 | 0 | 0 | 0 | 0 |
| Dallas Smith | D | 2 | 0 | 0 | 0 | 2 | 0 | 0 | 0 |

Goaltending

| Player | MIN | GP | W | L | T | GA | GAA | SO |
|---|---|---|---|---|---|---|---|---|
| Bernie Parent | 2083 | 39 | 11 | 20 | 3 | 128 | 3.69 | 1 |
| Eddie Johnston | 1744 | 33 | 10 | 19 | 2 | 108 | 3.72 | 1 |
| Gerry Cheevers | 340 | 7 | 0 | 4 | 1 | 34 | 6.00 | 0 |
| Bob Ring | 33 | 1 | 0 | 0 | 0 | 4 | 7.27 | 0 |
| Team: | 4200 | 70 | 21 | 43 | 6 | 274 | 3.91 | 2 |

Note:

Pos = Position;GP = Games played; G = Goals; A = Assists; Pts = Points; PIM = Penalty minutes; +/- = Plus/minus; PPG = Power-play goals; SHG = Short-handed goals; GWG = Game-winning goals
Pos = Position;GP = Games played; Min, TOI = Minutes played; W = Wins; L = Losses; T,T/OT = Ties; OTL = Overtime losses; GA = Goals-against; GAA = Goals-against average; SO = Shutouts; SA = Shots against; SV = Shots saved;SV% = Save percentage;

== Draft picks ==
Boston's draft picks at the 1965 NHL amateur draft held at the Queen Elizabeth Hotel in Montreal.

| Round | # | Player | Nationality | College/Junior/Club team (League) |
|---|---|---|---|---|
| 1 | 4 | Joe Bailey | Canada | St. Thomas Stars (WOJHL) |
| 2 | 9 | Bill Ramsay | Canada | Winnipeg Monarchs (MJHL) |

== See also ==
- 1965–66 NHL season
