= 1965–66 Toronto Maple Leafs season =

NHL hockey team season

1965–66 Toronto Maple Leafs
- League: 3rd NHL
- 1965–66 record: 34–25–11
- Home record: 22–9–4
- Road record: 12–16–7
- Goals for: 208
- Goals against: 187

Team information
- General manager: Punch Imlach
- Coach: Punch Imlach
- Captain: George Armstrong
- Arena: Maple Leaf Gardens

Team leaders
- Goals: Frank Mahovlich (32)
- Assists: George Armstrong (35)
- Points: Frank Mahovlich (56); Bob Pulford (56)
- Penalty minutes: Eddie Shack (88)
- Wins: Johnny Bower (18)
- Goals against average: Johnny Bower (2.25)

The 1965–66 Toronto Maple Leafs season was Toronto's 49th season in the National Hockey League (NHL). The team would make the playoffs for the eighth year in a row, before losing in the semifinals.

== Regular season ==
=== Final standings ===
Pos	Team	Pld	W	L	T	GF	GA	GD	Pts
1	Montreal Canadiens	70	41	21	8	239	173	+66	90
2	Chicago Black Hawks	70	37	25	8	240	187	+53	82
3	Toronto Maple Leafs	70	34	25	11	208	187	+21	79
4	Detroit Red Wings	70	31	27	12	221	194	+27	74
5	Boston Bruins	70	21	43	6	174	275	−101	48
6	New York Rangers	70	18	41	11	195	261	−66	47

Source: National Hockey League

=== Record vs. opponents ===
1965–66 NHL Records
Team	BOS	CHI	DET	MTL	NYR	TOR
Boston	—	4–8–2	2–11–1	4–9–1	8–5–1	4–9–1
Chicago	8–4–2	—	11–1–2	4–8–2	9–4–1	5–8–1
Detroit	11–2–1	1–11–2	—	4–8–2	7–3–4	8–4–2
Montreal	9–4–1	8–4–2	8–4–2	—	12–2	5–7–2
New York	5–8–1	4–9–1	3–7–4	2–12	—	3–6–5
Toronto	9–4–1	8–5–1	4–8–2	7–5–2	6–3–5	—

== Schedule and results ==
1965–66 regular season
October

Game	Result	Date	Score	Opponent	Record
1	L	October 23, 1965	0–4	Chicago Black Hawks (1965–66)	0–1–0
2	L	October 24, 1965	0–3	@ Detroit Red Wings (1965–66)	0–2–0
3	W	October 27, 1965	2–1	@ Boston Bruins (1965–66)	1–2–0
4	W	October 30, 1965	4–3	Detroit Red Wings (1965–66)	2–2–0

November

Game	Result	Date	Score	Opponent	Record
5	T	November 3, 1965	2–2	@ New York Rangers (1965–66)	2–2–1
6	L	November 4, 1965	1–5	@ Montreal Canadiens (1965–66)	2–3–1
7	L	November 6, 1965	2–4	New York Rangers (1965–66)	2–4–1
8	L	November 7, 1965	0–9	@ Chicago Black Hawks (1965–66)	2–5–1
9	T	November 10, 1965	3–3	Montreal Canadiens (1965–66)	2–5–2
10	W	November 13, 1965	5–2	New York Rangers (1965–66)	3–5–2
11	L	November 14, 1965	0–2	@ Boston Bruins (1965–66)	3–6–2
12	W	November 18, 1965	3–1	@ Montreal Canadiens (1965–66)	4–6–2
13	W	November 20, 1965	3–1	Chicago Black Hawks (1965–66)	5–6–2
14	W	November 21, 1965	7–3	@ Chicago Black Hawks (1965–66)	6–6–2
15	L	November 24, 1965	1–2	Montreal Canadiens (1965–66)	6–7–2
16	L	November 27, 1965	1–2	Boston Bruins (1965–66)	6–8–2
17	W	November 28, 1965	4–2	@ New York Rangers (1965–66)	7–8–2

December

Game	Result	Date	Score	Opponent	Record
18	T	December 1, 1965	2–2	@ New York Rangers (1965–66)	7–8–3
19	L	December 4, 1965	3–5	Detroit Red Wings (1965–66)	7–9–3
20	L	December 5, 1965	1–5	@ Detroit Red Wings (1965–66)	7–10–3
21	W	December 11, 1965	8–3	Boston Bruins (1965–66)	8–10–3
22	T	December 12, 1965	1–1	@ New York Rangers (1965–66)	8–10–4
23	W	December 15, 1965	5–3	Detroit Red Wings (1965–66)	9–10–4
24	W	December 16, 1965	3–2	@ Montreal Canadiens (1965–66)	10–10–4
25	W	December 18, 1965	8–4	New York Rangers (1965–66)	11–10–4
26	W	December 19, 1965	3–1	@ Boston Bruins (1965–66)	12–10–4
27	W	December 25, 1965	5–3	Chicago Black Hawks (1965–66)	13–10–4
28	T	December 26, 1965	1–1	@ Chicago Black Hawks (1965–66)	13–10–5
29	W	December 29, 1965	3–2	Montreal Canadiens (1965–66)	14–10–5

January

Game	Result	Date	Score	Opponent	Record
30	W	January 1, 1966	6–3	Boston Bruins (1965–66)	15–10–5
31	L	January 2, 1966	0–4	@ Detroit Red Wings (1965–66)	15–11–5
32	L	January 8, 1966	1–3	Detroit Red Wings (1965–66)	15–12–5
33	L	January 9, 1966	3–5	@ Chicago Black Hawks (1965–66)	15–13–5
34	W	January 13, 1966	6–0	@ Montreal Canadiens (1965–66)	16–13–5
35	W	January 15, 1966	6–1	Boston Bruins (1965–66)	17–13–5
36	L	January 16, 1966	0–4	@ Detroit Red Wings (1965–66)	17–14–5
37	W	January 19, 1966	6–2	New York Rangers (1965–66)	18–14–5
38	W	January 22, 1966	4–0	Chicago Black Hawks (1965–66)	19–14–5
39	L	January 23, 1966	1–2	@ Boston Bruins (1965–66)	19–15–5
40	W	January 29, 1966	6–3	Boston Bruins (1965–66)	20–15–5
41	L	January 30, 1966	4–8	@ New York Rangers (1965–66)	20–16–5

February

Game	Result	Date	Score	Opponent	Record
42	L	February 3, 1966	4–5	@ Montreal Canadiens (1965–66)	20–17–5
43	W	February 5, 1966	5–2	Chicago Black Hawks (1965–66)	21–17–5
44	L	February 6, 1966	2–3	@ Chicago Black Hawks (1965–66)	21–18–5
45	W	February 9, 1966	3–0	New York Rangers (1965–66)	22–18–5
46	T	February 12, 1966	3–3	Detroit Red Wings (1965–66)	22–18–6
47	T	February 13, 1966	4–4	@ Boston Bruins (1965–66)	22–18–7
48	W	February 16, 1966	3–1	Montreal Canadiens (1965–66)	23–18–7
49	L	February 19, 1966	1–3	New York Rangers (1965–66)	23–19–7
50	L	February 20, 1966	1–4	@ Detroit Red Wings (1965–66)	23–20–7
51	W	February 23, 1966	3–2	@ Chicago Black Hawks (1965–66)	24–20–7
52	W	February 26, 1966	3–2	Boston Bruins (1965–66)	25–20–7
53	T	February 27, 1966	2–2	@ New York Rangers (1965–66)	25–20–8

March

Game	Result	Date	Score	Opponent	Record
54	T	March 2, 1966	3–3	Montreal Canadiens (1965–66)	25–20–9
55	W	March 3, 1966	4–0	@ Montreal Canadiens (1965–66)	26–20–9
56	W	March 5, 1966	5–0	Chicago Black Hawks (1965–66)	27–20–9
57	W	March 6, 1966	5–3	@ Boston Bruins (1965–66)	28–20–9
58	W	March 9, 1966	1–0	Detroit Red Wings (1965–66)	29–20–9
59	W	March 12, 1966	6–0	Boston Bruins (1965–66)	30–20–9
60	L	March 13, 1966	1–5	@ Chicago Black Hawks (1965–66)	30–21–9
61	L	March 16, 1966	2–7	Montreal Canadiens (1965–66)	30–22–9
62	W	March 19, 1966	4–2	Chicago Black Hawks (1965–66)	31–22–9
63	L	March 20, 1966	1–6	@ Detroit Red Wings (1965–66)	31–23–9
64	W	March 24, 1966	2–0	@ Montreal Canadiens (1965–66)	32–23–9
65	W	March 26, 1966	3–1	Detroit Red Wings (1965–66)	33–23–9
66	W	March 27, 1966	5–1	@ New York Rangers (1965–66)	34–23–9
67	L	March 30, 1966	1–3	Montreal Canadiens (1965–66)	34–24–9
68	L	March 31, 1966	1–3	@ Boston Bruins (1965–66)	34–25–9

April

Game	Result	Date	Score	Opponent	Record
69	T	April 2, 1966	3–3	New York Rangers (1965–66)	34–25–10
70	T	April 3, 1966	3–3	@ Detroit Red Wings (1965–66)	34–25–11

Legend: Win (2 points) Loss (0 points) Tie (1 point)

== Playoffs ==
For the fourth straight year, Toronto met Montreal in the first round. The Canadiens were victorious over the Leafs in four straight games.

April 7	Toronto Maple Leafs	3–4	Montreal Canadiens	Montreal Forum	Recap
Eddie Shack (1) – 02:12; Frank Mahovlich (1) – pp – 18:08		First period	12:08 – pp – J.C. Tremblay (1)
No scoring		Second period	03:05 – John Ferguson (1); 08:13 – pp – Bobby Rousseau (1)
Bob Pulford (1) – 10:35		Third period	17:48 – Jean Beliveau (1)
Terry Sawchuck		Goalie stats	Gump Worsley

April 9	Toronto Maple Leafs	0–2	Montreal Canadiens	Montreal Forum	Recap
No scoring		First period	No scoring
No scoring		Second period	No scoring
No scoring		Third period	09:30 – pp – Claude Provost (1); 16:07 – Bobby Rousseau (2)
Terry Sawchuck		Goalie stats	Gump Worsley

April 12	Montreal Canadiens	5–2	Toronto Maple Leafs	Maple Leaf Gardens	Recap
No scoring		First period	01:26 – pp – Eddie Shack (2); 17:32 – Tim Horton (1)
Ralph Backstrom (1) – 08:16; Bobby Rousseau (3) – pp – 11:00; Terry Harper (1) – 11:26		Second period	No scoring
John Ferguson (2) – 00:16; Jean Beliveau (2) – 19:50		Third period	No scoring
Gump Worsley		Goalie stats	Johnny Bower

April 14	Montreal Canadiens	4–1	Toronto Maple Leafs	Maple Leaf Gardens	Recap
No scoring		First period	05:40 – Larry Hillman (1)
Gilles Tremblay (1) – pp – 09:32; Gilles Tremblay (2) – pp – 13:28		Second period	No scoring
Jimmy Roberts (1) – sh – 04:04; Dick Duff (1) – pp – 07:16		Third period	No scoring
Gump Worsley		Goalie stats	Johnny Bower

Montreal won series 4–0

== Player statistics ==
=== Regular season ===
Scoring

Player	GP	G	A	Pts	PIM
Frank Mahovlich	68	32	24	56	68
Bob Pulford	70	28	28	56	51
Dave Keon	69	24	30	54	4
George Armstrong	70	16	35	51	12
Eddie Shack	63	26	17	43	88
Ron Ellis	70	19	23	42	24
Red Kelly	63	8	24	32	12
Tim Horton	70	6	22	28	76
Larry Hillman	48	3	25	28	34
Brit Selby	61	14	13	27	26
Wally Boyer	46	4	17	21	23
Kent Douglas	64	6	14	20	97
Allan Stanley	59	4	14	18	35
Pete Stemkowski	56	4	12	16	55
Orland Kurtenbach	70	9	6	15	54
Marcel Pronovost	54	2	8	10	34
Bob Baun	44	0	6	6	68
Mike Walton	6	1	3	4	0
Jim Pappin	7	0	3	3	8
Larry Jeffrey	20	1	1	2	22
Eddie Joyal	14	0	2	2	2
Dick Gamble	2	1	0	1	0
Al Arbour	4	0	1	1	2
Johnny Bower	35	0	1	1	0
Wayne Carleton	2	0	1	1	0
Duane Rupp	2	0	1	1	0
Terry Sawchuk	27	0	1	1	12
Brian Conacher	2	0	0	0	2
Bruce Gamble	10	0	0	0	0
Brent Imlach	2	0	0	0	0
Jim McKenny	2	0	0	0	2
Darryl Sly	2	0	0	0	0
Al Smith	2	0	0	0	0
Gary Smith	3	0	0	0	0

Goaltending

Player	MIN	GP	W	L	T	GA	GAA	SA	SV	SV%	SO
Johnny Bower	1998	35	18	10	5	75	2.25				3
Terry Sawchuk	1521	27	10	11	3	80	3.16				1
Bruce Gamble	501	10	5	2	3	21	2.51				4
Al Smith	62	2	1	0	0	2	1.94				0
Gary Smith	118	3	0	2	0	7	3.56				0
Team:	4200	70	34	25	11	185	2.64				8

=== Playoffs ===
Scoring

Player	GP	G	A	Pts	PIM
Eddie Shack	4	2	1	3	33
Larry Hillman	4	1	1	2	6
Bob Pulford	4	1	1	2	12
Red Kelly	4	0	2	2	0
Dave Keon	4	0	2	2	0
Tim Horton	4	1	0	1	12
Frank Mahovlich	4	1	0	1	10
George Armstrong	4	0	1	1	4
Bob Baun	4	0	1	1	8
Wally Boyer	4	0	1	1	0
Kent Douglas	4	0	1	1	12
Johnny Bower	2	0	0	0	0
Ron Ellis	4	0	0	0	2
Orland Kurtenbach	4	0	0	0	20
Marcel Pronovost	4	0	0	0	6
Terry Sawchuk	2	0	0	0	0
Brit Selby	4	0	0	0	0
Allan Stanley	1	0	0	0	0
Pete Stemkowski	4	0	0	0	26

Goaltending

Player	MIN	GP	W	L	T	GA	GAA	SA	SV	SV%	SO
Johnny Bower	120	2	0	2		8	4.00				0
Terry Sawchuk	120	2	0	2		6	3.00				0
Team:	240	4	0	4		14	3.50				0

== Transactions ==
The Maple Leafs were involved in the following transactions during the 1965–66 season.

=== Trades ===
May 20, 1965	To Detroit Red Wings Andy Bathgate; Billy Harris; Gary Jarrett	To Toronto Maple Leafs Autry Erickson; Larry Jeffrey; Eddie Joyal; Lowell MacDonald; Marcel Pronovost
June 8, 1965	To Boston Bruins Ron Stewart	To Toronto Maple Leafs Andy Hebenton; Orland Kurtenbach; Pat Stapleton
September 1, 1965	To Springfield Indians (AHL) Larry Johnston; Bill Smith	To Toronto Maple Leafs Bruce Gamble

=== Intra-league draft ===
June 8, 1965	To New York Rangers Don Simmons
June 8, 1965	To Montreal Canadiens Tom McCarthy
June 8, 1965	From Tulsa Oilers (CPHL) Larry Johnston
June 9, 1965	To Boston Bruins Gerry Cheevers
June 9, 1965	To Chicago Black Hawks Pat Stapleton

=== Reverse draft ===
June 9, 1965	To Baltimore Clippers (AHL) Mike Corbett
June 9, 1965	From Boston Bruins Bob Perreault

=== Waivers ===
June 8, 1965	To Detroit Red Wings Don McKenney

== Draft picks ==
The Maple Leafs opted not to participate in the 1965 NHL amateur draft, which was held on April 27, 1965, at the Queen Elizabeth Hotel in Montreal.

== See also ==
- 1965–66 NHL season
