= 1965–66 New York Rangers season =

NHL hockey team season

1965–66 New York Rangers
- League: 6th NHL
- 1965–66 record: 18–41–11
- Home record: 12–16–7
- Road record: 6–25–4
- Goals for: 195
- Goals against: 261

Team information
- General manager: Emile Francis
- Coach: Red Sullivan; Emile Francis
- Captain: Bob Nevin
- Arena: Madison Square Garden

Team leaders
- Goals: Bob Nevin (29)
- Assists: Bob Nevin (33)
- Points: Bob Nevin (62)
- Penalty minutes: Reggie Fleming (124)
- Wins: Cesare Maniago (9)
- Goals against average: Cesare Maniago (3.50)

The 1965–66 New York Rangers season was the franchise's 40th season. The Rangers posted an 18–41–11 record in the regular season, finished in last place in the NHL and did not make the playoffs for the fourth year in a row for the first time since the 1951–52 to 1954–55 seasons.

== Regular season ==
=== Final standings ===
Pos	Team	Pld	W	L	T	GF	GA	GD	Pts
1	Montreal Canadiens	70	41	21	8	239	173	+66	90
2	Chicago Black Hawks	70	37	25	8	240	187	+53	82
3	Toronto Maple Leafs	70	34	25	11	208	187	+21	79
4	Detroit Red Wings	70	31	27	12	221	194	+27	74
5	Boston Bruins	70	21	43	6	174	275	−101	48
6	New York Rangers	70	18	41	11	195	261	−66	47

Source: National Hockey League

=== Record vs. opponents ===
1965–66 NHL Records
Team	BOS	CHI	DET	MTL	NYR	TOR
Boston	—	4–8–2	2–11–1	4–9–1	8–5–1	4–9–1
Chicago	8–4–2	—	11–1–2	4–8–2	9–4–1	5–8–1
Detroit	11–2–1	1–11–2	—	4–8–2	7–3–4	8–4–2
Montreal	9–4–1	8–4–2	8–4–2	—	12–2	5–7–2
New York	5–8–1	4–9–1	3–7–4	2–12	—	3–6–5
Toronto	9–4–1	8–5–1	4–8–2	7–5–2	6–3–5	—

== Schedule and results ==
1965–66 regular season
October: 1–2–0 (home: 0–1–0; road: 1–1–0)

Game	October	Opponent	Score	Record
1	24	Montreal Canadiens	4–3	0–1–0
2	27	@ Montreal Canadiens	4–3	0–2–0
3	30	@ Boston Bruins	8–2	1–2–0

November: 4–6–4 (home: 2–3–3; road: 2–3–1)

Game	November	Opponent	Score	Record
4	3	Toronto Maple Leafs	2–2	1–2–1
5	6	@ Toronto Maple Leafs	4–2	2–2–1
6	7	Detroit Red Wings	3–2	3–2–1
7	10	Boston Bruins	2–2	3–2–2
8	11	@ Detroit Red Wings	3–3	3–2–3
9	13	@ Toronto Maple Leafs	5–2	3–3–3
10	14	@ Chicago Black Hawks	4–2	4–3–3
11	17	Chicago Black Hawks	5–3	4–4–3
12	20	@ Montreal Canadiens	9–3	4–5–3
13	21	Detroit Red Wings	3–3	4–5–4
14	24	Boston Bruins	4–1	5–5–4
15	25	@ Boston Bruins	6–2	5–6–4
16	27	Chicago Black Hawks	1–0	5–7–4
17	28	Toronto Maple Leafs	4–2	5–8–4

December: 2–9–3 (home: 2–3–2; road: 0–6–1)

Game	December	Opponent	Score	Record
18	1	Toronto Maple Leafs	2–2	5–8–5
19	4	@ Montreal Canadiens	4–3	5–9–5
20	5	Chicago Black Hawks	6–2	5–10–5
21	8	@ Chicago Black Hawks	2–2	5–10–6
22	9	@ Detroit Red Wings	7–3	5–11–6
23	11	Detroit Red Wings	4–2	5–12–6
24	12	Toronto Maple Leafs	1–1	5–12–7
25	18	@ Toronto Maple Leafs	8–4	5–13–7
26	19	Montreal Canadiens	3–2	6–13–7
27	22	@ Chicago Black Hawks	4–3	6–14–7
28	23	@ Detroit Red Wings	4–2	6–15–7
29	25	@ Boston Bruins	4–2	6–16–7
30	26	Boston Bruins	6–4	7–16–7
31	29	Chicago Black Hawks	3–0	7–17–7

January: 4–7–1 (home: 3–2–0; road: 1–5–1)

Game	January	Opponent	Score	Record
32	1	@ Montreal Canadiens	5–1	7–18–7
33	2	Montreal Canadiens	6–3	7–19–7
34	8	Chicago Black Hawks	6–4	8–19–7
35	9	Boston Bruins	3–1	8–20–7
36	15	@ Detroit Red Wings	4–4	8–20–8
37	16	@ Chicago Black Hawks	6–5	9–20–8
38	19	@ Toronto Maple Leafs	6–2	9–21–8
39	22	@ Boston Bruins	5–3	9–22–8
40	23	@ Detroit Red Wings	5–1	9–23–8
41	26	Detroit Red Wings	4–3	10–23–8
42	29	@ Montreal Canadiens	6–2	10–24–8
43	30	Toronto Maple Leafs	8–4	11–24–8

February: 3–9–1 (home: 2–3–1; road: 1–6–0)

Game	February	Opponent	Score	Record
44	2	@ Chicago Black Hawks	4–3	11–25–8
45	5	@ Boston Bruins	5–3	11–26–8
46	6	Montreal Canadiens	4–0	11–27–8
47	9	@ Toronto Maple Leafs	3–0	11–28–8
48	10	@ Detroit Red Wings	6–2	11–29–8
49	12	Boston Bruins	9–2	12–29–8
50	13	@ Chicago Black Hawks	6–1	12–30–8
51	16	Chicago Black Hawks	5–2	12–31–8
52	19	@ Toronto Maple Leafs	3–1	13–31–8
53	20	Montreal Canadiens	5–3	13–32–8
54	23	Detroit Red Wings	5–0	14–32–8
55	26	@ Montreal Canadiens	4–3	14–33–8
56	27	Toronto Maple Leafs	2–2	14–33–9

March: 4–7–1 (home: 3–3–1; road: 1–4–0)

Game	March	Opponent	Score	Record
57	2	Boston Bruins	5–3	15–33–9
58	3	@ Boston Bruins	5–4	16–33–9
59	6	Detroit Red Wings	1–1	16–33–10
60	9	Chicago Black Hawks	1–0	17–33–10
61	12	@ Chicago Black Hawks	4–2	17–34–10
62	13	Montreal Canadiens	3–2	18–34–10
63	16	Boston Bruins	3–1	18–35–10
64	19	@ Montreal Canadiens	6–2	18–36–10
65	20	@ Boston Bruins	4–3	18–37–10
66	23	Detroit Red Wings	2–1	18–38–10
67	27	Toronto Maple Leafs	5–1	18–39–10
68	31	@ Detroit Red Wings	5–3	18–40–10

April: 0–1–1 (home: 0–1–0; road: 0–0–1)

Game	April	Opponent	Score	Record
69	2	@ Toronto Maple Leafs	3–3	18–40–11
70	3	Montreal Canadiens	4–1	18–41–11

Legend: Win (2 points) Loss (0 points) Tie (1 point)

== Player statistics ==
Skaters

Regular season
Player	GP	G	A	Pts	PIM
Bob Nevin	69	29	33	62	10
Donnie Marshall	69	26	28	54	6
Jean Ratelle	67	21	30	51	10
Phil Goyette	60	11	31	42	6
Earl Ingarfield	68	20	16	36	35
Vic Hadfield	67	16	19	35	112
Harry Howell	70	4	29	33	92
Bill Hicke	49	9	18	27	21
Rod Gilbert	34	10	15	25	20
Reg Fleming^{†}	35	10	14	24	124
Jim Neilson	65	4	19	23	84
Doug Robinson	51	8	12	20	8
Wayne Hillman	68	3	17	20	70
Rod Seiling	52	5	10	15	24
Mike McMahon	41	0	12	12	34
John McKenzie^{‡}	35	6	5	11	36
Garry Peters	63	7	3	10	42
Arnie Brown	64	1	7	8	106
Bob Plager	18	0	5	5	22
Lou Angotti^{‡}	21	2	2	4	2
Ray Cullen	8	1	3	4	0
Paul Andrea	4	1	1	2	0
Jim Johnson	5	1	0	1	0
Ted Taylor	4	0	1	1	2
Dunc McCallum	2	0	0	0	2
Al LeBrun	2	0	0	0	0
Al Hamilton	4	0	0	0	0
Larry Mickey	7	0	0	0	2
John Brenneman	11	0	0	0	14

Goaltenders

Regular season
Player	GP	TOI	W	L	T	GA	GAA	SO
Ed Giacomin	36	2096	8	19	7	128	3.66	0
Cesare Maniago	28	1613	9	16	3	94	3.50	2
Don Simmons	11	491	1	6	1	37	4.52	0

^{†}Denotes player spent time with another team before joining Rangers. Stats reflect time with Rangers only.
^{‡}Traded mid-season. Stats reflect time with Rangers only.

Note:

Pos = Position;GP = Games played; G = Goals; A = Assists; Pts = Points; PIM = Penalty minutes; +/- = Plus/minus; PPG = Power-play goals; SHG = Short-handed goals; GWG = Game-winning goals
Pos = Position;GP = Games played; Min, TOI = Minutes played; W = Wins; L = Losses; T,T/OT = Ties; OTL = Overtime losses; GA = Goals-against; GAA = Goals-against average; SO = Shutouts; SA = Shots against; SV = Shots saved;SV% = Save percentage;

== Draft picks ==
New York's picks at the 1965 NHL amateur draft in Montreal, Canada.

Round	#	Player	Position	Nationality	College/Junior/Club team (League)
1	1	Andre Veilleux	RW	Canada	Montreal Rangers (LHJAA)
2	6	George Surmay	G	Canada	Kelvin Midgets (MAAAMHL)
3	10	Michel Parizeau	C	Canada	Montreal Rangers (LHJAA)

== See also ==
- 1965–66 NHL season
