= Norm Ullman =

Canadian ice hockey player (born 1935)

- Hockey Hall of Fame, 1982
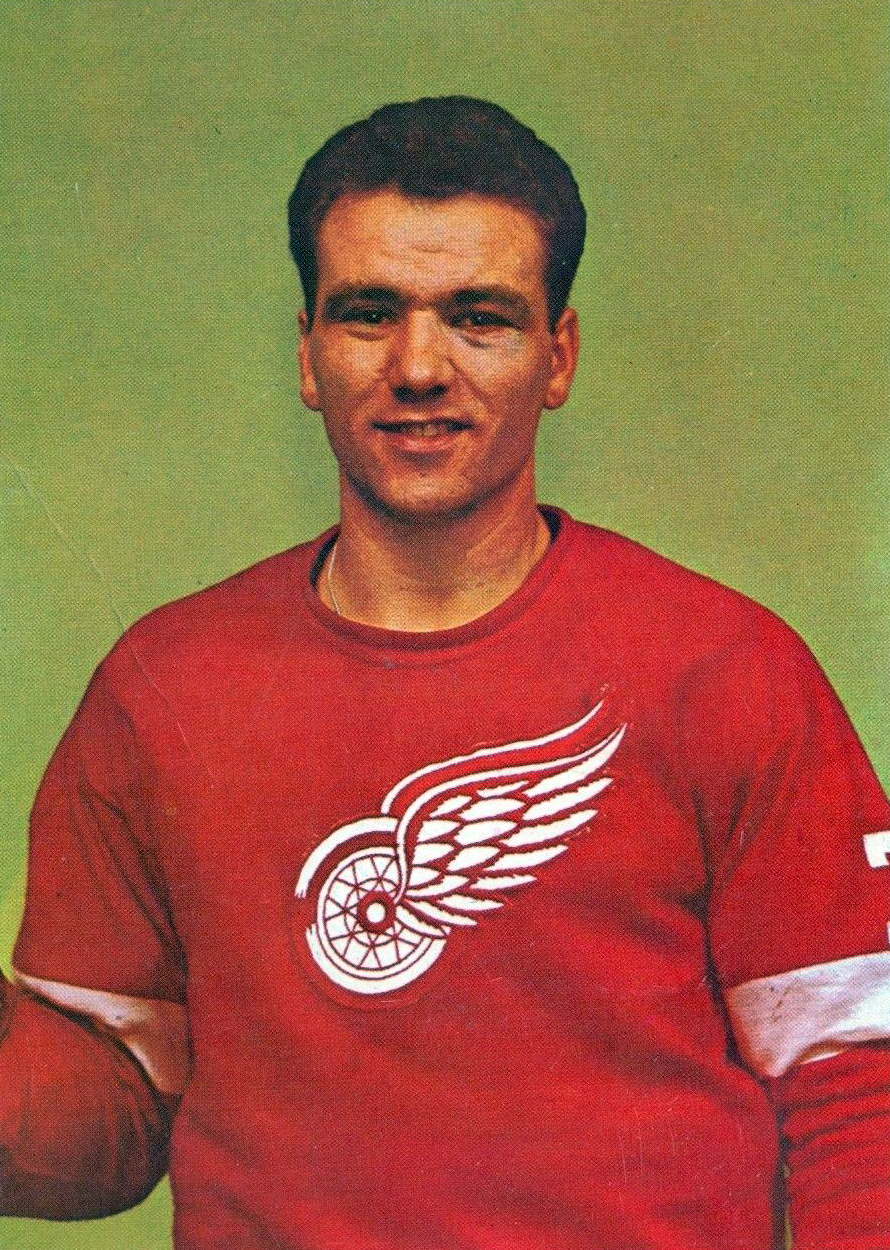
- Ullman with the Detroit Red Wings, c. 1963
- Born: December 26, 1935 (age 90) Provost, Alberta, Canada
- Height: 5 ft 10 in (178 cm)
- Weight: 185 lb (84 kg; 13 st 3 lb)
- Position: Centre
- Shot: Left
- Played for: Detroit Red Wings; Toronto Maple Leafs; Edmonton Oilers
- Playing career: 1955–1977

Norman Victor Alexander Ullman (UHL-muhn; born December 26, 1935) is a Canadian former ice hockey centre for 20 seasons in the National Hockey League (NHL) for the Detroit Red Wings and Toronto Maple Leafs. He also played two seasons in the World Hockey Association (WHA) for the Edmonton Oilers of the World Hockey Association from 1975 to 1977.

Committed to hockey from a young age, Ullman played minor league and Western Hockey League action in his native Alberta before becoming pro with the Red Wings in 1955, where he became quickly relied upon to play in the lineup, rarely missing a game. From 1957 to 1969, Ullman recorded twelve consecutive 20-goal seasons, which made him only the third player to do in NHL history. An eleven-time NHL All-Star Game selection, Ullman led the league in goals scored in the 1964–65 season and was named a First team All-Star. Traded in a blockbuster deal in March 1968 to the Maple Leafs, he recorded two 30-goal seasons with the team and scored his 400th goal in 1970.

He departed the Maple Leafs after the conclusion of the 1974–75 season nearing the age of 40. He joined the WHA and recorded 30 goals in his first season to reach 500 total goals as a professional hockey player. He retired the following season at the age of 41. When his NHL career ended, Ullman had recorded 490 goals and 739 assists for 1,229 points, all of which were in the top ten all-time for a career. Ullman was inducted into the Hockey Hall of Fame in 1982.

== Early life ==
Ullman was born on December 26, 1935, in Provost, Alberta, Canada. He was one of seven children born to parents John and Madeline Ullman. John worked as a janitorial supervisor for the Edmonton Separate School Board. His eldest sister died in 1961, while his youngest brother Gordie died of cancer at the age of 13.

== Playing career ==
Growing up in Edmonton, Ullman learned to skate on a rink built by the United States Army before World War II. He began his minor hockey career playing for the Edmonton Oil Kings of the Western Canada Junior Hockey League (WCJHL). Due to his commitment to hockey, Ullman dropped out of high school before Grade 11. He then skated with the Edmonton Flyers of the Western Hockey League before turned pro with the Detroit Red Wings of the National Hockey League in the 1955–56 NHL season. Ullman spent the majority of his rookie season on Detroit's fourth line with fellow former Flyer Bronco Horvath. He scored his first career NHL goal on October 16, 1955, against the Toronto Maple Leafs. Ullman finished his rookie season with nine goals and nine assists for 18 points through 66 games. In the playoffs, he scored a goal with three assists as the Red Wings lost to the Montreal Canadiens in the Stanley Cup Final.

Ullman improved upon returning to the Red Wings for his sophomore season. He credited his improvement to following the advice of his former coach, Ken McAuley. Through his first five games of the 1956–57 season, Ullman tied for second in scoring with five points. He was also promoted to center the Red Wings' Production Line between Ted Lindsay and Gordie Howe. By the end of October, Ullman ranked among the top five scorers in the NHL with seven points. Coach Jimmy Skinner credited the Production Line for the team's improvements from the previous season. By mid-November, all three members of the Production Line ranked among the top of the NHL in scoring and points.

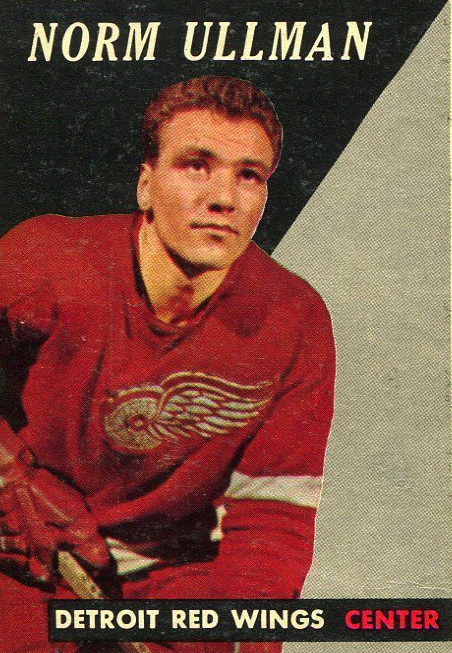
Ullman in 1958.

He finished with 16 goals and 36 assists for 52 points, the first of eighteen consecutive seasons with at least 50 points. In the playoffs, he recorded just one goal in five games as the Red Wings were upset in the first round. He became a routine goalscoring threat with his third season in the 1957–58 campaign, scoring 23 goals for what was the first of twelve straight 20-goal seasons, although the Red Wings failed to make it out of the first round in each of the next three seasons. Prior to the 1958–59 season, Ullman, who had worn the #16 jersey to start his career, was switched over to #7 (which had been worn by various players after the trade of Lindsay in 1957), which he would wear for the rest of his Red Wings career. He played in all 70 games for the first time in the 1959–60 season and made the first of six straight appearances in the NHL All-Star Game. He reached a new high in points with 70 in the 1960–61 season on a team-leading 28 goals and 42 assists. Although the Red Wings made the Stanley Cup Final, Ullman had just four assists for the postseason as the team lost to the Chicago Black Hawks. He was the runner-up for the Lady Byng Memorial Trophy to Red Kelly.

He was limited to 61 games in the 1963–64 season but still scored 21 goals for the team. He rebounded the following season with 42 goals in 70 games, setting a career and league high while also having 41 assists for an 83-point season (second only to Stan Mikita). He led the league in even strength goals (31) and game-winning goals with 10. He was named a first team All-Star and was second in the Hart voting for valuable play to Bobby Hull. As of 2026, he is currently the last Red Wing to lead the NHL in goals for a season. Playoff success eluded Ullman when it came to the ultimate prize, as the Red Wings reached the Stanley Cup Final five times with Ullman on the roster (1956, 1961, 1963, 1964, 1966) but lost them all. Ullman led the playoffs in assists (12) in the 1963 playoffs and points in 1963 (16) and 1966 (15). In the 1965 semifinals against Chicago on April 11, he recorded two goals in the span of five seconds to tie Joe Malone for the fastest time between two goals in a Stanley Cup playoff game, a mark that has never been passed.

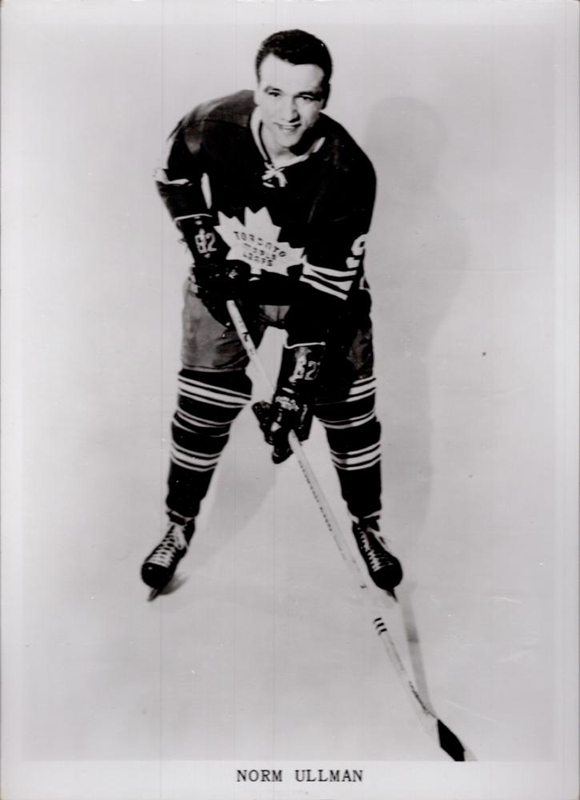
Late 1960s headshot of Ullman posing for the Toronto Maple Leafs

He had consecutive 70-point seasons in his final two full seasons with Detroit. In the 1967–68 season (the first with twelve teams), with Detroit lagging in the standings and with Ullman having recorded 30 goals by March, Ullman was part of a six-player blockbuster transaction in which he was traded along with Paul Henderson and Floyd Smith from the Red Wings to the Toronto Maple Leafs for Frank Mahovlich, Pete Stemkowski, Garry Unger and Carl Brewer on March 4, 1968. The Maple Leafs and Red Wings were in fifth and sixth place respectively at the bottom of the East Division standings at the time of the deal.

He recorded five goals to close out the season for a total of 35 on the year. He recorded another 35-goal season for 77 points in the 1968–69 season and reached the All-Star Game. Maple Leafs coach Punch Imlach liked Ullman so much that in January 1969, he called Ullman the "best all-around player I have had in 10 years." In September 1969, he was made the highest-paid player in team history with a three-year deal worth $50,000 a year (in the previous year, he made $10,000). Ullman would record five further 50-point seasons with Toronto, with his career-high coming in the 1970–71 season when he had 85 on 51 assists and 34 goals. On Christmas night in 1970, he became the fifth player with 400 goals in NHL history, doing so on the road against the Minnesota North Stars. He recorded his 1,000th point in the 1971–72 season on October 16, 1971, becoming the fifth player to join the mark in NHL history. In 1972, the Chicago Black Hawks expressed interest to trade for him, but he said no. Late in the 1973–74 season, Ullman saw his ice time start to decrease. In the 1974–75 season, the 39-year-old Ullman dressed for 80 games with a reduced output in ice time and recorded nine goals with 26 assists. Team owner Harold Ballard unceremoniously dumped him and Dave Keon after the season ended. With offers from the Kansas City Scouts or to be an assistant coach with the Red Wings, Ullman found a spot with the professional league World Hockey Association and the Edmonton Oilers for the 1975–76 WHA season in September 1975. He led the team in scoring with 31 goals and 56 assists. On December 10, 1975, versus the Quebec Nordiques, he scored his 500th professional goal. In his final season in the 1976–77 WHA season with the Oilers, he had 16 goals with 27 assists in 67 games while hampered by injuries that had him state near the end of the season that it would likely be his last as a player. He closed out his career with three assists in five games in the 1977 WHA playoffs. After he retired, he spent a number of years playing old timer hockey in Canada.

== Honours and legacy ==
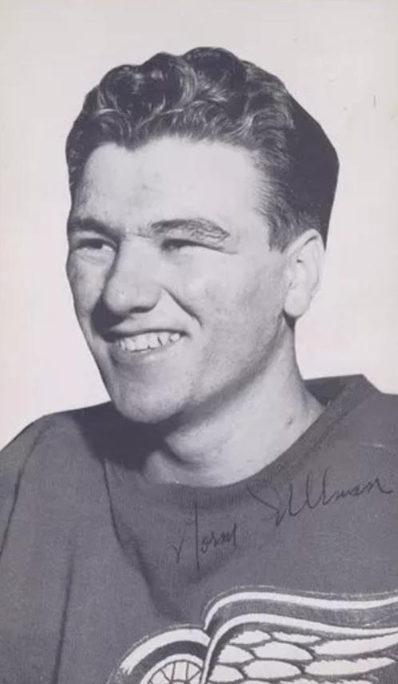
Undated 1950s postcard of Ullman for Detroit Red Wings; decades after his retirement, he still ranks in the top ten in franchise history for goals (324, seventh), assists (434, eighth), and points (758, eighth).

In his twenty NHL seasons, Ullman played in 1,440 games, missing only 48 total games from 1955 to 1975. Described as a smooth skater with good checking ability for a centre, when Ullman departed the league in 1975, he was fourth all-time in assists with 739 and eighth in goals with 490. His sixteen 20-goal seasons were second most in league history next to Gordie Howe. He recorded eighteen 50-point seasons, which was second in league history next to Howe. In his career span, he was second in points (1,229) and assists (739) to Stan Mikita. Only Gordie Howe and Maurice Richard had more consecutive 20-goal seasons than Ullman when his streak ended after the 1969–70 season. He was third all-time in points and assists for a Red Wing when he left the team in 1968; over half a century later, he ranks 8th in each category. Ullman stated that his one regret was leaving the NHL ten goals short of the 500 club. Known by some as "The Quiet Man", Ullman was described by friends and the press as a modest player who ironically was stated by Red Wings general manager Jack Adams as a tough negotiator due to his soft-spoken nature. By 1983, Ullman was stated to have arthritis in both shoulders alongside sore knees and strained cartilage, a testimony to his willingness to take a check in order to make a good play. He explained:

I always had to play that way. I never had a booming shot like some guys. They wouldn't have to do too much, but they'd still end up scoring the goals.

Ullman was inducted into the Hockey Hall of Fame in 1982. He was named an honorary captain of the 39th National Hockey League All-Star Game in 1988. When asked in 1990 who Ullman was like in terms of play, referee Bruce Hood (who operated in the league from 1963 to 1984) equated him to Steve Yzerman, describing the following about Ullman:

He was intelligent. He could read everything on the ice, set up any play and handle the puck well. He was there all the time.

In 1998, he was ranked number 90 on The Hockey News' list of the 100 Greatest Hockey Players.

== Career statistics ==
=== Regular season and playoffs ===
| | | | Regular season | | | | | Playoffs |
| Season | Team | League | GP | G | A | Pts | PIM | GP | G | A | Pts | PIM |
|---|---|---|---|---|---|---|---|---|---|---|---|---|
| 1951–52 | Edmonton Oil Kings | WCJHL | 1 | 1 | 0 | 1 | 0 | 1 | 0 | 0 | 0 | 0 |
| 1952–53 | Edmonton Oil Kings | WCJHL | 36 | 29 | 47 | 76 | 4 | 13 | 4 | 6 | 10 | 0 |
| 1953–54 | Edmonton Oil Kings | WCJHL | 36 | 56 | 45 | 101 | 17 | 10 | 11 | 26 | 37 | 0 |
| 1953–54 | Edmonton Flyers | WHL | 1 | 1 | 0 | 1 | 0 | — | — | — | — | — |
| 1954–55 | Edmonton Flyers | WHL | 60 | 25 | 34 | 59 | 23 | 9 | 3 | 1 | 4 | 6 |
| 1955–56 | Detroit Red Wings | NHL | 66 | 9 | 9 | 18 | 26 | 10 | 1 | 3 | 4 | 13 |
| 1956–57 | Detroit Red Wings | NHL | 64 | 16 | 36 | 52 | 47 | 5 | 1 | 1 | 2 | 6 |
| 1957–58 | Detroit Red Wings | NHL | 69 | 23 | 28 | 51 | 38 | 4 | 0 | 2 | 2 | 4 |
| 1958–59 | Detroit Red Wings | NHL | 69 | 22 | 36 | 58 | 42 | — | — | — | — | — |
| 1959–60 | Detroit Red Wings | NHL | 70 | 24 | 34 | 58 | 46 | 6 | 2 | 2 | 4 | 0 |
| 1960–61 | Detroit Red Wings | NHL | 70 | 28 | 42 | 70 | 34 | 11 | 0 | 4 | 4 | 4 |
| 1961–62 | Detroit Red Wings | NHL | 70 | 26 | 38 | 64 | 54 | — | — | — | — | — |
| 1962–63 | Detroit Red Wings | NHL | 70 | 26 | 30 | 56 | 53 | 11 | 4 | 12 | 16 | 14 |
| 1963–64 | Detroit Red Wings | NHL | 61 | 21 | 30 | 51 | 55 | 14 | 7 | 10 | 17 | 6 |
| 1964–65 | Detroit Red Wings | NHL | 70 | 42 | 41 | 83 | 70 | 7 | 6 | 4 | 10 | 2 |
| 1965–66 | Detroit Red Wings | NHL | 70 | 31 | 41 | 72 | 35 | 12 | 6 | 9 | 15 | 12 |
| 1966–67 | Detroit Red Wings | NHL | 68 | 26 | 44 | 70 | 26 | — | — | — | — | — |
| 1967–68 | Detroit Red Wings | NHL | 58 | 30 | 25 | 55 | 26 | — | — | — | — | — |
| 1967–68 | Toronto Maple Leafs | NHL | 13 | 5 | 12 | 17 | 2 | — | — | — | — | — |
| 1968–69 | Toronto Maple Leafs | NHL | 75 | 35 | 42 | 77 | 41 | 4 | 1 | 0 | 1 | 0 |
| 1969–70 | Toronto Maple Leafs | NHL | 74 | 18 | 42 | 60 | 37 | — | — | — | — | — |
| 1970–71 | Toronto Maple Leafs | NHL | 73 | 34 | 51 | 85 | 24 | 6 | 0 | 2 | 2 | 2 |
| 1971–72 | Toronto Maple Leafs | NHL | 77 | 23 | 50 | 73 | 26 | 5 | 1 | 3 | 4 | 6 |
| 1972–73 | Toronto Maple Leafs | NHL | 65 | 20 | 35 | 55 | 10 | — | — | — | — | — |
| 1973–74 | Toronto Maple Leafs | NHL | 78 | 22 | 47 | 69 | 12 | 4 | 1 | 1 | 2 | 0 |
| 1974–75 | Toronto Maple Leafs | NHL | 80 | 9 | 26 | 35 | 8 | 7 | 0 | 0 | 0 | 2 |
| 1975–76 | Edmonton Oilers | WHA | 77 | 31 | 56 | 87 | 12 | 4 | 1 | 3 | 4 | 2 |
| 1976–77 | Edmonton Oilers | WHA | 67 | 16 | 27 | 43 | 28 | 5 | 0 | 3 | 3 | 0 |
| NHL totals | | | 1,410 | 490 | 739 | 1,229 | 712 | 106 | 30 | 53 | 83 | 67 |
| WHA totals | | | 144 | 47 | 83 | 130 | 40 | 9 | 1 | 6 | 7 | 2 |

== Awards and achievements ==
- NHL All-Star Game — 1955, 1960, 1961, 1962, 1963, 1964, 1965, 1967, 1968, 1969, 1974
- NHL goal-scoring leader — 1965
- First team All-Star — 1965
- Second team All-Star — 1967
- Hockey Hall of Fame — 1982
- Alberta Sports Hall of Fame — 1998

== See also ==
- List of NHL statistical leaders
- List of NHL players with 1,000 points
- List of NHL players with 1,000 games played

| Preceded by Bobby Hull | NHL Goal Leader; 1965 | Succeeded by Bobby Hull |
