= Bob Ring =

American ice hockey player

- Born: October 6, 1946; Winchester, Massachusetts, U.S.
- Died: June 22, 2017 (aged 70); Bluffton, South Carolina, U.S.
- Height: 5 ft 10 in (178 cm)
- Weight: 170 lb (77 kg; 12 st 2 lb)
- Position: Goaltender
- Caught: Left
- Played for: Boston Bruins
- Playing career: 1964–1970

Robert Ring (October 6, 1946 – June 22, 2017) was an American professional ice hockey goaltender who played in one National Hockey League game for the Boston Bruins during the 1965–66 NHL season. On October 30, 1965 he was replaced the injured Ed Johnston during an 8-2 loss to the New York Rangers. He graduated from Wakefield High School (Massachusetts), Acadia University, and received his Master's degree from Boston University. He worked for The Phone Company as Director of Human Resources in Boston after his playing career ended.

== Career statistics ==
=== Regular season and playoffs ===
			Regular season									Playoffs
Season	Team	League	GP	W	L	T	MIN	GA	SO	GAA	SV%	GP	W	L	MIN	GA	SO	GAA	SV%
1964–65	Niagara Falls Flyers	OHA	1	0	0	0	40	3	0	4.50	—	—	—	—	—	—	—	—	—
1965–66	Boston Bruins	NHL	1	0	0	0	34	4	0	7.24	.810	—	—	—	—	—	—	—	—
1965–66	Springfield Indians	AHL	1	0	0	0	20	3	0	9.00	—	—	—	—	—	—	—	—	—
1965–66	Niagara Falls Flyers	OHA	22	—	—	—	1320	74	1	3.24	—	—	—	—	—	—	—	—	—
1967–68	Acadia University	CIAU	16	10	5	1	940	62	0	3.96	—	—	—	—	—	—	—	—	—
1968–69	Acadia University	CIAU	18	12	5	1	1080	56	0	3.11	—	—	—	—	—	—	—	—	—
1969–70	Acadia University	CIAU	10	—	—	—	600	43	0	4.30	—	—	—	—	—	—	—	—	—
NHL totals			1	0	0	0	34	4	0	7.24	.810	—	—	—	—	—	—	—	—

== See also ==
- List of players who played only one game in the NHL
