= 1965–66 Montreal Canadiens season =

NHL hockey team season (won Stanley Cup)

1965–66 Montreal Canadiens
- Stanley Cup champions
- Prince of Wales Trophy winners
- League: 1st NHL
- 1965–66 record: 41–21–8
- Home record: 23–11–1
- Road record: 18–10–7
- Goals for: 239
- Goals against: 173

Team information
- General manager: Sam Pollock
- Coach: Toe Blake
- Captain: Jean Beliveau
- Alternate captains: Henri Richard; Jean-Guy Talbot
- Arena: Montreal Forum

Team leaders
- Goals: Bobby Rousseau (30)
- Assists: Jean Beliveau and Bobby Rousseau (48)
- Points: Bobby Rousseau (78)
- Penalty minutes: John Ferguson (153)
- Wins: Gump Worsley (29)
- Goals against average: Gump Worsley (2.36)

The 1965–66 Montreal Canadiens season was the team's 57th season of play. The Canadiens won the Stanley Cup for the second consecutive season, and the 14th time in their history. Bobby Rousseau registered 78 points and tied with Stan Mikita for second in the overall 1965–66 NHL scoring race.

== Regular season ==
=== Final standings ===
Pos	Team	Pld	W	L	T	GF	GA	GD	Pts
1	Montreal Canadiens	70	41	21	8	239	173	+66	90
2	Chicago Black Hawks	70	37	25	8	240	187	+53	82
3	Toronto Maple Leafs	70	34	25	11	208	187	+21	79
4	Detroit Red Wings	70	31	27	12	221	194	+27	74
5	Boston Bruins	70	21	43	6	174	275	−101	48
6	New York Rangers	70	18	41	11	195	261	−66	47

Source: National Hockey League

=== Record vs. opponents ===
1965–66 NHL Records
Team	BOS	CHI	DET	MTL	NYR	TOR
Boston	—	4–8–2	2–11–1	4–9–1	8–5–1	4–9–1
Chicago	8–4–2	—	11–1–2	4–8–2	9–4–1	5–8–1
Detroit	11–2–1	1–11–2	—	4–8–2	7–3–4	8–4–2
Montreal	9–4–1	8–4–2	8–4–2	—	12–2	5–7–2
New York	5–8–1	4–9–1	3–7–4	2–12	—	3–6–5
Toronto	9–4–1	8–5–1	4–8–2	7–5–2	6–3–5	—

== Schedule and results ==
1965–66 regular season
October

Game	Result	Date	Score	Opponent	Record
1	W	October 23, 1965	8–1	Detroit Red Wings (1965–66)	1–0–0
2	W	October 24, 1965	4–3	@ New York Rangers (1965–66)	2–0–0
3	W	October 27, 1965	4–3	New York Rangers (1965–66)	3–0–0
4	L	October 30, 1965	4–6	Chicago Black Hawks (1965–66)	3–1–0
5	T	October 31, 1965	2–2	@ Detroit Red Wings (1965–66)	3–1–1

November

Game	Result	Date	Score	Opponent	Record
6	W	November 4, 1965	5–1	Toronto Maple Leafs (1965–66)	4–1–1
7	L	November 6, 1965	1–3	Boston Bruins (1965–66)	4–2–1
8	W	November 7, 1965	5–2	@ Boston Bruins (1965–66)	5–2–1
9	T	November 10, 1965	3–3	@ Toronto Maple Leafs (1965–66)	5–2–2
10	W	November 13, 1965	5–2	@ Chicago Black Hawks (1965–66)	6–2–2
11	T	November 14, 1965	2–2	@ Detroit Red Wings (1965–66)	6–2–3
12	L	November 18, 1965	1–3	Toronto Maple Leafs (1965–66)	6–3–3
13	W	November 20, 1965	9–3	New York Rangers (1965–66)	7–3–3
14	L	November 21, 1965	2–3	@ Boston Bruins (1965–66)	7–4–3
15	W	November 24, 1965	2–1	@ Toronto Maple Leafs (1965–66)	8–4–3
16	W	November 27, 1965	3–2	Detroit Red Wings (1965–66)	9–4–3
17	W	November 28, 1965	2–1	@ Chicago Black Hawks (1965–66)	10–4–3

December

Game	Result	Date	Score	Opponent	Record
18	W	December 4, 1965	4–3	New York Rangers (1965–66)	11–4–3
19	T	December 5, 1965	4–4	@ Boston Bruins (1965–66)	11–4–4
20	W	December 8, 1965	8–3	Boston Bruins (1965–66)	12–4–4
21	W	December 11, 1965	2–1	Chicago Black Hawks (1965–66)	13–4–4
22	W	December 12, 1965	5–3	@ Chicago Black Hawks (1965–66)	14–4–4
23	L	December 16, 1965	2–3	Toronto Maple Leafs (1965–66)	14–5–4
24	W	December 18, 1965	2–1	Boston Bruins (1965–66)	15–5–4
25	L	December 19, 1965	2–3	@ New York Rangers (1965–66)	15–6–4
26	W	December 25, 1965	4–3	Detroit Red Wings (1965–66)	16–6–4
27	L	December 26, 1965	0–1	@ Detroit Red Wings (1965–66)	16–7–4
28	L	December 29, 1965	2–3	@ Toronto Maple Leafs (1965–66)	16–8–4

January

Game	Result	Date	Score	Opponent	Record
29	W	January 1, 1966	5–1	New York Rangers (1965–66)	17–8–4
30	W	January 2, 1966	6–3	@ New York Rangers (1965–66)	18–8–4
31	L	January 5, 1966	2–4	Chicago Black Hawks (1965–66)	18–9–4
32	W	January 8, 1966	6–0	Boston Bruins (1965–66)	19–9–4
33	L	January 9, 1966	2–4	@ Detroit Red Wings (1965–66)	19–10–4
34	L	January 13, 1966	0–6	Toronto Maple Leafs (1965–66)	19–11–4
35	W	January 15, 1966	6–4	Chicago Black Hawks (1965–66)	20–11–4
36	W	January 16, 1966	3–1	@ Boston Bruins (1965–66)	21–11–4
37	L	January 20, 1966	2–5	@ Detroit Red Wings (1965–66)	21–12–4
38	L	January 22, 1966	0–3	Detroit Red Wings (1965–66)	21–13–4
39	T	January 23, 1966	3–3	@ Chicago Black Hawks (1965–66)	21–13–5
40	L	January 26, 1966	2–4	Chicago Black Hawks (1965–66)	21–14–5
41	W	January 29, 1966	6–2	New York Rangers (1965–66)	22–14–5
42	W	January 30, 1966	3–1	@ Boston Bruins (1965–66)	23–14–5

February

Game	Result	Date	Score	Opponent	Record
43	W	February 3, 1966	5–4	Toronto Maple Leafs (1965–66)	24–14–5
44	T	February 5, 1966	2–2	Detroit Red Wings (1965–66)	24–14–6
45	W	February 6, 1966	4–0	@ New York Rangers (1965–66)	25–14–6
46	L	February 10, 1966	0–2	@ Boston Bruins (1965–66)	25–15–6
47	T	February 12, 1966	2–2	@ Chicago Black Hawks (1965–66)	25–15–7
48	W	February 13, 1966	4–3	@ Detroit Red Wings (1965–66)	26–15–7
49	L	February 16, 1966	1–3	@ Toronto Maple Leafs (1965–66)	26–16–7
50	W	February 19, 1966	5–2	Chicago Black Hawks (1965–66)	27–16–7
51	W	February 20, 1966	5–3	@ New York Rangers (1965–66)	28–16–7
52	W	February 23, 1966	3–2	Boston Bruins (1965–66)	29–16–7
53	W	February 26, 1966	4–3	New York Rangers (1965–66)	30–16–7
54	W	February 27, 1966	5–3	@ Detroit Red Wings (1965–66)	31–16–7

March

Game	Result	Date	Score	Opponent	Record
55	T	March 2, 1966	3–3	@ Toronto Maple Leafs (1965–66)	31–16–8
56	L	March 3, 1966	0–4	Toronto Maple Leafs (1965–66)	31–17–8
57	W	March 5, 1966	7–2	Detroit Red Wings (1965–66)	32–17–8
58	W	March 6, 1966	1–0	@ Chicago Black Hawks (1965–66)	33–17–8
59	L	March 9, 1966	1–3	Boston Bruins (1965–66)	33–18–8
60	W	March 12, 1966	4–1	Detroit Red Wings (1965–66)	34–18–8
61	L	March 13, 1966	2–3	@ New York Rangers (1965–66)	34–19–8
62	W	March 16, 1966	7–2	@ Toronto Maple Leafs (1965–66)	35–19–8
63	W	March 19, 1966	6–2	New York Rangers (1965–66)	36–19–8
64	L	March 20, 1966	2–4	@ Chicago Black Hawks (1965–66)	36–20–8
65	L	March 24, 1966	0–2	Toronto Maple Leafs (1965–66)	36–21–8
66	W	March 26, 1966	5–2	Boston Bruins (1965–66)	37–21–8
67	W	March 27, 1966	3–1	@ Boston Bruins (1965–66)	38–21–8
68	W	March 30, 1966	3–1	@ Toronto Maple Leafs (1965–66)	39–21–8

April

Game	Result	Date	Score	Opponent	Record
69	W	April 2, 1966	8–3	Chicago Black Hawks (1965–66)	40–21–8
70	W	April 3, 1966	4–1	@ New York Rangers (1965–66)	41–21–8

Legend: Win (2 points) Loss (0 points) Tie (1 point)

== Playoffs ==
=== Finals ===
With this series, Toe Blake had coached the Canadiens to seven Stanley Cup championships in eleven years. Henri Richard, a member of all seven, would score the series winner in overtime of game six. Despite the Wings losing, their goalie Roger Crozier would win the Conn Smythe Trophy.

Detroit Red Wings vs. Montreal Canadiens

Date	Visitors	Score	Home	Score	Notes
April 17	Detroit	3	Montreal	2	
April 20	Detroit	5	Montreal	2	
April 22	Montreal	4	Detroit	2	
April 25	Montreal	2	Detroit	1	
April 27	Detroit	1	Montreal	5	
April 29	Montreal	3	Detroit	2	OT

Montreal wins Stanley Cup four games to two.

== Player statistics ==
=== Regular season ===
==== Scoring ====
Player	Pos	GP	G	A	Pts	PIM	PPG	SHG	GWG
Bobby Rousseau	RW	70	30	48	78	20	10	0	4
Jean Beliveau	C	67	29	48	77	50	13	0	7
Henri Richard	C	62	22	39	61	47	3	0	7
Claude Provost	RW	70	19	36	55	38	3	0	5
Gilles Tremblay	LW	70	27	21	48	24	5	0	4
Dick Duff	LW	63	21	24	45	78	5	0	2
Ralph Backstrom	C	67	22	20	42	10	1	0	3
J. C. Tremblay	D	59	6	29	35	8	2	0	1
Claude Larose	RW	64	15	18	33	67	0	0	3
Jacques Laperriere	D	57	6	25	31	85	2	1	2
Yvan Cournoyer	RW	65	18	11	29	8	16	0	0
John Ferguson	LW	65	11	14	25	153	1	0	1
Jean-Guy Talbot	D	59	1	14	15	50	0	0	0
Ted Harris	D	53	0	13	13	87	0	0	0
Terry Harper	D	69	1	11	12	91	0	0	0
Jim Roberts	D/RW	70	5	5	10	20	0	1	1
Dave Balon	LW	45	3	7	10	24	0	0	1
Red Berenson	C	23	3	4	7	12	0	0	0
Noel Price	D	15	0	6	6	8	0	0	0
Leon Rochefort	RW	1	0	1	1	0	0	0	0
Gump Worsley	G	51	0	1	1	4	0	0	0
Jean Gauthier	D	2	0	0	0	0	0	0	0
Danny Grant	RW	1	0	0	0	0	0	0	0
Charlie Hodge	G	26	0	0	0	0	0	0	0
Don Johns	D	1	0	0	0	0	0	0	0

==== Goaltending ====
Player	MIN	GP	W	L	T	GA	GAA	SO
Gump Worsley	2899	51	29	14	6	114	2.36	2
Charlie Hodge	1301	26	12	7	2	56	2.58	1
Team:	4200	70	41	21	8	170	2.43	3

=== Playoffs ===
==== Scoring ====
Player	Pos	GP	G	A	Pts	PIM	PPG	SHG	GWG
J. C. Tremblay	D	10	2	9	11	2			
Jean Beliveau	C	10	5	5	10	6			
Gilles Tremblay	LW	10	4	5	9	0			
Bobby Rousseau	RW	10	4	4	8	6			
Ralph Backstrom	C	10	3	4	7	4			
Dick Duff	LW	10	2	5	7	2			
Dave Balon	LW	9	2	3	5	16			
Yvan Cournoyer	RW	10	2	3	5	2			
Terry Harper	D	10	2	3	5	18			
Claude Provost	RW	10	2	3	5	2			
Henri Richard	C	8	1	4	5	2			
John Ferguson	LW	10	2	0	2	44			
Jim Roberts	D/RW	10	1	1	2	10			
Leon Rochefort	RW	4	1	1	2	4			
Jean-Guy Talbot	D	10	0	2	2	8			
Claude Larose	RW	6	0	1	1	31			
Noel Price	D	3	0	1	1	0			
Ted Harris	D	10	0	0	0	38			
Gump Worsley	G	10	0	0	0	0			

==== Goaltending ====
Player	MIN	GP	W	L	GA	GAA	SO
Gump Worsley	602	10	8	2	20	1.99	1
Team:	602	10	8	2	20	1.99	1

Note:

Pos = Position;GP = Games played; G = Goals; A = Assists; Pts = Points; PIM = Penalty minutes; +/- = Plus/minus; PPG = Power-play goals; SHG = Short-handed goals; GWG = Game-winning goals
Pos = Position;GP = Games played; Min, TOI = Minutes played; W = Wins; L = Losses; T,T/OT = Ties; OTL = Overtime losses; GA = Goals-against; GAA = Goals-against average; SO = Shutouts; SA = Shots against; SV = Shots saved;SV% = Save percentage;

== Milestones ==
- November 1965: Henri Richard got his 600th career point
- January 1966: Richard would earn his 400th career assist
- Jean Beliveau would play in his 800th career game during the season.
- During the season, Beliveau would become the first Canadiens player to accumulate 500 career assists.

== Draft picks ==
Montreal's draft picks at the 1965 NHL amateur draft held at the Queen Elizabeth Hotel in Montreal.

Round	#	Player	Nationality	College/Junior/Club team (League)
1	5	Pierre Bouchard	Canada	St. Vincent de Paul Saints (LHJAA)

== See also ==
- 1965–66 NHL season
- List of Stanley Cup champions
