= 1965–66 Chicago Black Hawks season =

National Hockey League team season

1965–66 Chicago Black Hawks
- League: 2nd NHL
- 1965–66 record: 37–25–8
- Home record: 21–8–6
- Road record: 16–17–2
- Goals for: 240
- Goals against: 187

Team information
- General manager: Tommy Ivan
- Coach: Billy Reay
- Captain: Pierre Pilote
- Alternate captains: Bill Hay; Bobby Hull; Stan Mikita
- Arena: Chicago Stadium

Team leaders
- Goals: Bobby Hull (54)
- Assists: Stan Mikita (48)
- Points: Bobby Hull (97)
- Penalty minutes: Matt Ravlich (78)
- Wins: Glenn Hall (34)
- Goals against average: Glenn Hall (2.63)

The 1965–66 Chicago Black Hawks season was the Hawks' 40th season in the NHL, and the club was coming off a third-place finish in 1964–65, as Chicago had a record of 34–28–8, earning 76 points, which was their lowest point total since 1961–62. The Hawks then upset the first place Detroit Red Wings in the NHL semi-finals, before losing to the Montreal Canadiens in seven games in the 1965 Stanley Cup Finals.

Chicago began the season very strong, going unbeaten in their first seven games, with a 6–0–1 record, before recording their first loss of the year. The Hawks continued to play very strong hockey all season long, only once did they have a losing streak of more than three games, as the club set a team record for wins with 37, and their 82 points earned was a six-point improvement over the previous season, as the Black Hawks finished second in the NHL, and earned a playoff spot for the eighth consecutive season.

On February 26, 1966, team owner James D. Norris died due to a heart attack. Norris was 59 years old.

Offensively, the Hawks were led by Bobby Hull, who had a record breaking season, as he scored an NHL record 54 goals, while earning an NHL record 97 points, as he won the Art Ross Trophy and Hart Memorial Trophy for his efforts. Stan Mikita recorded a team high 48 assists and finished second with 78 points in NHL scoring. Phil Esposito had a strong season, scoring 27 goals and 53 points, while Bill Hay had 20 goals and 51 points. Kenny Wharram and Doug Mohns each scored over 20 goals, earning 26 and 22 respectively. On the blueline, Pierre Pilote led the way, earning 36 points, while fellow defenseman Pat Stapleton earned 34 points. Matt Ravlich led the club with 78 penalty minutes.

In goal, Glenn Hall earned the majority of playing time, tying the club record with 34 victories, while posting a team best 2.63 GAA, along with 4 shutouts.

The Hawks would face the Detroit Red Wings in the NHL semi-finals for the fourth consecutive season, as the Wings finished fourth in the NHL standings with a record of 31–27–12, recording 74 points, which was eight fewer than the Black Hawks. The series opened with two games at Chicago Stadium, and the Black Hawks took a 1–0 series lead, as they defeated Detroit 2–1, however, the Red Wings evened the series up, as Detroit stunned Chicago with a 7–0 win in the second game. The series shifted to the Detroit Olympia for the next two games, however, in the third game, the Hawks took the series lead, with a 2–1 victory, but once again, the Red Wings evened the series, easily defeating Chicago 5–1 to tie the series up at two. The fifth game was played in Chicago, but it was Detroit winning the game 5–3, and taking the series lead, and the underdog Red Wings completed the upset in the sixth game held back in Detroit, as they defeated the Black Hawks 3–2 to end the series.

== Season standings ==
Pos	Team	Pld	W	L	T	GF	GA	GD	Pts
1	Montreal Canadiens	70	41	21	8	239	173	+66	90
2	Chicago Black Hawks	70	37	25	8	240	187	+53	82
3	Toronto Maple Leafs	70	34	25	11	208	187	+21	79
4	Detroit Red Wings	70	31	27	12	221	194	+27	74
5	Boston Bruins	70	21	43	6	174	275	−101	48
6	New York Rangers	70	18	41	11	195	261	−66	47

Source: National Hockey League

=== Record vs. opponents ===
1965–66 NHL Records
Team	BOS	CHI	DET	MTL	NYR	TOR
Boston	—	4–8–2	2–11–1	4–9–1	8–5–1	4–9–1
Chicago	8–4–2	—	11–1–2	4–8–2	9–4–1	5–8–1
Detroit	11–2–1	1–11–2	—	4–8–2	7–3–4	8–4–2
Montreal	9–4–1	8–4–2	8–4–2	—	12–2	5–7–2
New York	5–8–1	4–9–1	3–7–4	2–12	—	3–6–5
Toronto	9–4–1	8–5–1	4–8–2	7–5–2	6–3–5	—

== Schedule and results ==
=== Regular season ===
1965–66 regular season
October

Game	Date	Visitor	Score	Home	Record	Points
1	October 23	Chicago Black Hawks	4–0	Toronto Maple Leafs	1–0–0	2
2	October 24	Chicago Black Hawks	6–2	Boston Bruins	2–0–0	4
3	October 28	Chicago Black Hawks	5–1	Detroit Red Wings	3–0–0	6
4	October 30	Chicago Black Hawks	6–4	Montreal Canadiens	4–0–0	8

November

Game	Date	Visitor	Score	Home	Record	Points
5	November 3	Boston Bruins	2–2	Chicago Black Hawks	4–0–1	9
6	November 7	Toronto Maple Leafs	0–9	Chicago Black Hawks	5–0–1	11
7	November 10	Detroit Red Wings	2–5	Chicago Black Hawks	6–0–1	13
8	November 13	Montreal Canadiens	5–2	Chicago Black Hawks	6–1–1	13
9	November 14	New York Rangers	4–2	Chicago Black Hawks	6–2–1	13
10	November 17	Chicago Black Hawks	5–3	New York Rangers	7–2–1	15
11	November 20	Chicago Black Hawks	1–3	Toronto Maple Leafs	7–3–1	15
12	November 21	Toronto Maple Leafs	7–3	Chicago Black Hawks	7–4–1	15
13	November 23	Chicago Black Hawks	3–2	Detroit Red Wings	8–4–1	17
14	November 25	Detroit Red Wings	1–3	Chicago Black Hawks	9–4–1	19
15	November 27	Chicago Black Hawks	1–0	New York Rangers	10–4–1	21
16	November 28	Montreal Canadiens	2–1	Chicago Black Hawks	10–5–1	21

December

Game	Date	Visitor	Score	Home	Record	Points
17	December 1	Boston Bruins	2–4	Chicago Black Hawks	11–5–1	23
18	December 4	Chicago Black Hawks	10–1	Boston Bruins	12–5–1	25
19	December 5	Chicago Black Hawks	6–2	New York Rangers	13–5–1	27
20	December 8	New York Rangers	2–2	Chicago Black Hawks	13–5–2	28
21	December 11	Chicago Black Hawks	1–2	Montreal Canadiens	13–6–2	28
22	December 12	Montreal Canadiens	5–3	Chicago Black Hawks	13–7–2	28
23	December 15	Boston Bruins	4–8	Chicago Black Hawks	14–7–2	30
24	December 18	Chicago Black Hawks	1–3	Detroit Red Wings	14–8–2	30
25	December 19	Detroit Red Wings	4–5	Chicago Black Hawks	15–8–2	32
26	December 22	New York Rangers	3–4	Chicago Black Hawks	16–8–2	34
27	December 25	Chicago Black Hawks	3–5	Toronto Maple Leafs	16–9–2	34
28	December 26	Toronto Maple Leafs	1–1	Chicago Black Hawks	16–9–3	35
29	December 29	Chicago Black Hawks	3–0	New York Rangers	17–9–3	37
30	December 31	Chicago Black Hawks	4–1	Detroit Red Wings	18–9–3	39

January

Game	Date	Visitor	Score	Home	Record	Points
31	January 2	Boston Bruins	1–3	Chicago Black Hawks	19–9–3	41
32	January 5	Chicago Black Hawks	4–2	Montreal Canadiens	20–9–3	43
33	January 8	Chicago Black Hawks	4–6	New York Rangers	20–10–3	43
34	January 9	Toronto Maple Leafs	3–5	Chicago Black Hawks	21–10–3	45
35	January 13	Chicago Black Hawks	1–1	Boston Bruins	21–10–4	46
36	January 15	Chicago Black Hawks	4–6	Montreal Canadiens	21–11–4	46
37	January 16	New York Rangers	6–5	Chicago Black Hawks	21–12–4	46
38	January 20	Chicago Black Hawks	3–4	Boston Bruins	21–13–4	46
39	January 22	Chicago Black Hawks	0–4	Toronto Maple Leafs	21–14–4	46
40	January 23	Montreal Canadiens	3–3	Chicago Black Hawks	21–14–5	47
41	January 26	Chicago Black Hawks	4–2	Montreal Canadiens	22–14–5	49
42	January 27	Chicago Black Hawks	3–5	Boston Bruins	22–15–5	49
43	January 29	Detroit Red Wings	4–4	Chicago Black Hawks	22–15–6	50
44	January 30	Chicago Black Hawks	5–1	Detroit Red Wings	23–15–6	52

February

Game	Date	Visitor	Score	Home	Record	Points
45	February 2	New York Rangers	3–4	Chicago Black Hawks	24–15–6	54
46	February 5	Chicago Black Hawks	2–5	Toronto Maple Leafs	24–16–6	54
47	February 6	Toronto Maple Leafs	2–3	Chicago Black Hawks	25–16–6	56
48	February 9	Detroit Red Wings	1–2	Chicago Black Hawks	26–16–6	58
49	February 12	Montreal Canadiens	2–2	Chicago Black Hawks	26–16–7	59
50	February 13	New York Rangers	1–6	Chicago Black Hawks	27–16–7	61
51	February 16	Chicago Black Hawks	5–2	New York Rangers	28–16–7	63
52	February 19	Chicago Black Hawks	2–5	Montreal Canadiens	28–17–7	63
53	February 20	Boston Bruins	1–5	Chicago Black Hawks	29–17–7	65
54	February 23	Toronto Maple Leafs	3–2	Chicago Black Hawks	29–18–7	65
55	February 26	Chicago Black Hawks	4–1	Detroit Red Wings	30–18–7	67
56	February 27	Boston Bruins	1–7	Chicago Black Hawks	31–18–7	69

March

Game	Date	Visitor	Score	Home	Record	Points
57	March 2	Detroit Red Wings	4–5	Chicago Black Hawks	32–18–7	71
58	March 5	Chicago Black Hawks	0–5	Toronto Maple Leafs	32–19–7	71
59	March 6	Montreal Canadiens	1–0	Chicago Black Hawks	32–20–7	71
60	March 9	Chicago Black Hawks	0–1	New York Rangers	32–21–7	71
61	March 12	New York Rangers	2–4	Chicago Black Hawks	33–21–7	73
62	March 13	Toronto Maple Leafs	1–5	Chicago Black Hawks	34–21–7	75
63	March 16	Detroit Red Wings	1–4	Chicago Black Hawks	35–21–7	77
64	March 19	Chicago Black Hawks	2–4	Toronto Maple Leafs	35–22–7	77
65	March 20	Montreal Canadiens	2–4	Chicago Black Hawks	36–22–7	79
66	March 23	Chicago Black Hawks	1–3	Boston Bruins	36–23–7	79
67	March 27	Chicago Black Hawks	1–1	Detroit Red Wings	36–23–8	80
68	March 29	Boston Bruins	2–4	Chicago Black Hawks	37–23–8	82

April

Game	Date	Visitor	Score	Home	Record	Points
69	April 2	Chicago Black Hawks	3–8	Montreal Canadiens	37–24–8	82
70	April 3	Chicago Black Hawks	2–4	Boston Bruins	37–25–8	82

Legend: Win (2 points) Loss (0 points) Tie (1 point)

=== Playoffs ===
1966 Stanley Cup playoffs
Semifinals vs. (4) Detroit Red Wings – Red Wings win 4–2

Game	Date	Visitor	Score	Home	Series
1	April 7	Detroit Red Wings	1–2	Chicago Black Hawks	1–0
2	April 10	Detroit Red Wings	7–0	Chicago Black Hawks	1–1
3	April 12	Chicago Black Hawks	2–1	Detroit Red Wings	2–1
4	April 14	Chicago Black Hawks	1–5	Detroit Red Wings	2–2
5	April 17	Detroit Red Wings	5–3	Chicago Black Hawks	2–3
6	April 19	Chicago Black Hawks	2–3	Detroit Red Wings	2–4

Legend: Win Loss

== Season stats ==
=== Scoring leaders ===
Player	GP	G	A	Pts	PIM
Bobby Hull	65	54	43	97	70
Stan Mikita	68	30	48	78	58
Phil Esposito	69	27	26	53	49
Bill Hay	68	20	31	51	20
Doug Mohns	70	22	27	49	63

=== Goaltending ===
Player	GP	TOI	W	L	T	GA	SO	GAA
Glenn Hall	64	3747	34	21	7	164	4	2.63
Dave Dryden	11	453	3	4	1	23	0	3.05

== Playoff stats ==
=== Scoring leaders ===
Player	GP	G	A	Pts	PIM
Pat Stapleton	6	2	3	5	4
Bobby Hull	6	2	2	4	10
Stan Mikita	6	1	2	3	2
Chico Maki	3	1	1	2	0
Phil Esposito	6	1	1	2	2

=== Goaltending ===
Player	GP	TOI	W	L	GA	SO	GAA
Dave Dryden	1	13	0	0	0	0	0.00
Glenn Hall	6	347	2	4	22	0	3.80

== Draft picks ==
Chicago's draft picks at the 1965 NHL amateur draft held at the Queen Elizabeth Hotel in Montreal, Quebec.

Round	#	Player	Nationality	College/Junior/Club team (League)
1	2	Andy Culligan	Canada	St. Michael's Buzzers (MetJHL)
2	7	Brian McKenney	Canada	Smiths Falls Bears (CJAHL)

== Sources ==
- Hockey-Reference
- Rauzulu's Street
- Goalies Archive
- HockeyDB
- National Hockey League Guide & Record Book 2007
