= Roger Crozier =

Canadian ice hockey goaltender (1942–1996)

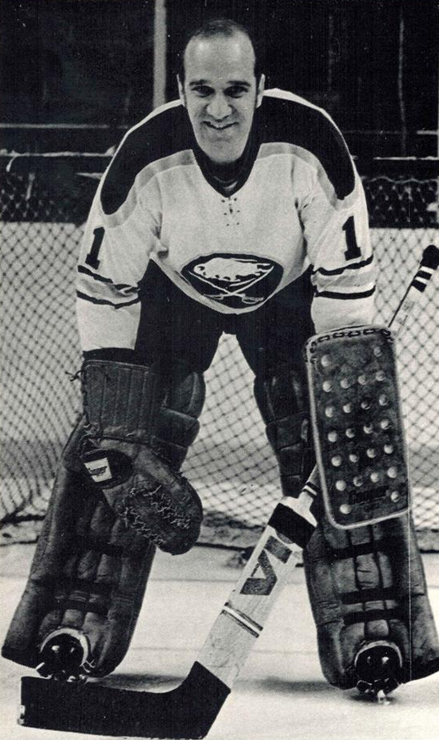
- Crozier with the Buffalo Sabres in 1974
- Born: March 16, 1942 Bracebridge, Ontario, Canada
- Died: January 11, 1996 (aged 53) Wilmington, Delaware, U.S.
- Height: 5 ft 8 in (173 cm)
- Weight: 160 lb (73 kg; 11 st 6 lb)
- Position: Goaltender
- Caught: Right
- Played for: Detroit Red Wings; Buffalo Sabres; Washington Capitals
- Playing career: 1960–1977

Roger Allan Crozier (March 16, 1942 – January 11, 1996) was a Canadian professional ice hockey player. He was a goaltender for fourteen seasons in the National Hockey League (NHL) for the Detroit Red Wings, Buffalo Sabres and Washington Capitals. During his career, Crozier was named to the NHL First All-Star Team once, was a Calder Memorial Trophy winner, and was the first player to win the Conn Smythe Trophy while playing for the losing team in the Stanley Cup Final. He was the last goaltender in the NHL to start all of his team's games in the regular season, in 1964–65.

From his junior hockey career until his death, Crozier was plagued by pancreatitis and other health problems. Despite them, he helped his junior team win the Memorial Cup in 1959–60, played in over 500 NHL regular season games and participated in three Stanley Cup Finals. His health problems led to his retirement in 1976–77 and he joined the Capitals' front office shortly after. Crozier left the Capitals in 1983 to work for MBNA bank. In 2000, MBNA unveiled a new trophy called the Roger Crozier Saving Grace Award which was awarded annually from 1999–2000 to 2006–07 to the goaltender with the best save percentage during the regular season in the NHL. The Buffalo Sports Hall of Fame inducted Crozier in 2009.

== Background ==
Crozier was born and raised in the town of Bracebridge, Ontario. He was one of fourteen children of Lloyd and Mildred Crozier (née Austin). At the age of six, Crozier began playing goaltender, a position that he would grow to "like". Identified as a "special goaltending talent" by his town's senior hockey team, the Bracebridge Bears, he became their starting goaltender at the age of 14. In 1958–59, he helped the Bears become district champions in the Intermediate C playoffs.

== Playing career ==
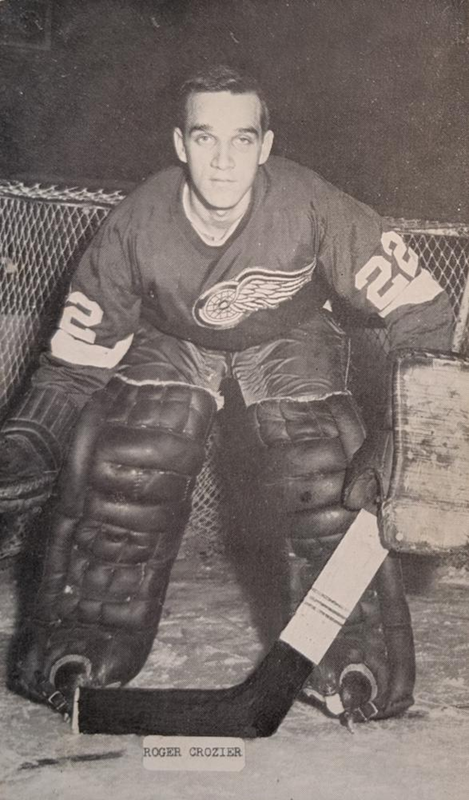
1960s postcard of Crozier with the Detroit Red Wings

=== Early career ===
Crozier spent his junior career with the St. Catharines Teepees of the junior Ontario Hockey Association (OHA) from 1959 to 1962. At the time, the Teepees were sponsored by the Chicago Black Hawks of the National Hockey League. The sponsorship system gave the Black Hawks the rights to all of the Teepees' players. In 1959–60, Crozier helped the Teepees win the Memorial Cup. During his time with the Teepees, Crozier developed his first ulcer, a problem that would plague him for the rest of his career.

Crozier spent most of the 1960–61 season in the OHA. Because of his small frame and size, he was not a favourite with scouts or critics. Despite this, the Buffalo Bisons of the American Hockey League (AHL) recruited Crozier to fill in for their injured starting goaltender, Denis DeJordy, that year. In three games, Crozier recorded two wins and a 2.31 goals against average (GAA). He returned to the Teepees for the 1961–62 season, during which he also had short stints with the Bisons and the Sault Ste. Marie Thunderbirds of the Eastern Professional Hockey League (EPHL).

While playing in the minors, Crozier adopted the butterfly style of goaltending, which he used during his NHL career. At first, his coaches in the minors tried to convince him to abandon this style, thinking that it would never succeed in the NHL. Crozier also added an element of acrobacy in his game.

=== Detroit Red Wings (1963–70) ===
The Black Hawks traded Crozier to the Detroit Red Wings in 1963. The young goaltender, now a full-time professional, spent the season in the minors mostly with the St. Louis Braves in the EPHL; he also played four games for the Buffalo Bisons in the AHL. In 1963–64, he played 44 games with the Pittsburgh Hornets, Detroit's AHL affiliate. He won numerous awards that year, including the Hap Holmes Memorial Award for the fewest goals given up, the Dudley "Red" Garrett Memorial Award for top rookie, and a spot on the Second All-Star Team. Crozier also made his NHL debut that season. The Red Wings' starting goaltender, Terry Sawchuk, was injured and Crozier was called up as a substitute. In only 15 games, he impressed management so well that he was made the Wings' new starting goaltender; Sawchuk was left unprotected by the Red Wings during the intraleague waiver draft in the off-season and was picked up by the Toronto Maple Leafs. This made Crozier the Red Wings' starting goaltender at the age of 22.

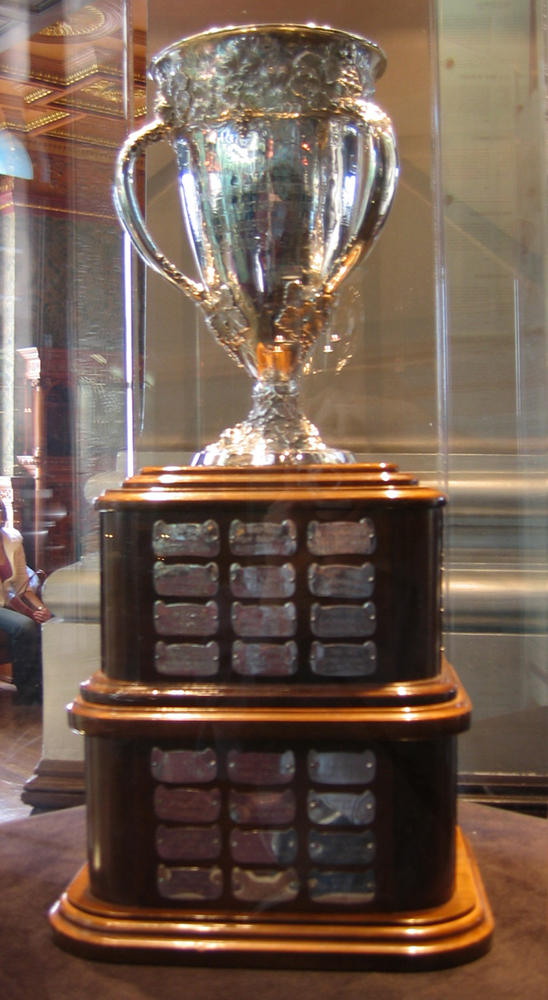
Crozier won the Calder Memorial Trophy in 1965.

In 1964–65, his rookie season, Crozier started all of his team's games, the last goalie to do so in the NHL, and he led the league in wins and shutouts with 40 and six respectively. His 2.42 GAA was the second lowest in the league. He was awarded the Calder Memorial Trophy as the NHL's top rookie and he was named to the NHL First All-Star Team. During his sophomore season, Crozier missed the team's couple of games due to pancreatitis. In 64 games that year, he posted 27 wins and led the league with seven shutouts, and the Red Wings clinched a spot in the playoffs. After eliminating the Black Hawks in the semi-finals, the Red Wings squared off against the Montreal Canadiens in the 1966 Stanley Cup Final. The Red Wings won the first two games, but the Canadiens came back and won the next two. In the fourth game, Crozier suffered a leg injury. He played in game five, but the injury curbed his mobility. The Canadiens won the Stanley Cup in game six. Even though the Red Wings lost, Crozier was awarded the Conn Smythe Trophy for being the most valuable player in the playoffs. He was the first goaltender to win the award and the first player to win it in a losing effort.

Due to pancreatitis, Crozier missed twelve games out of 70 in 1966–67. His numbers were down as he won only 22 games and recorded a 3.35 GAA. The Red Wings missed the playoffs. After another bout of pancreatitis at the beginning of the 1967–68 season, Crozier announced his retirement due to stress and depression. Six weeks later, however, he returned to the ice; he played five games with the Fort Worth Wings of the Central Professional Hockey League (CPHL) as conditioning, then returned to Detroit. After two more seasons on a mediocre Red Wings team, he was traded to the newly formed Buffalo Sabres in 1970.

=== Buffalo Sabres (1970–77) and Washington Capitals (1977) ===
Crozier with the Buffalo Sabres in the 1970s

In the 1970 NHL Expansion Draft, Buffalo Sabres General Manager Punch Imlach drafted Tom Webster from the Boston Bruins and promptly dealt him to the Red Wings for Crozier on June 10, 1970. Crozier started the Sabres' first NHL game on October 10, 1970, against the Pittsburgh Penguins. He stopped all but one of 36 shots to earn the franchise's first victory, 2–1. On December 6, 1970, Crozier earned the franchise's first shutout in a 1–0 win over the Minnesota North Stars. By late December however, Crozier was deeply exhausted and most of the Sabres' goaltending duties fell upon Joe Daley and Dave Dryden. Crozier finished the season with a 9–20–7 record and a 3.68 GAA. The Sabres also missed the playoffs, finishing fifth in the East Division. Adding to Crozier's continual health problems, his gallbladder was removed during the off-season.

The 1971–72 season was even worse for the Sabres as they finished with the fewest wins in the league with 16. Crozier posted a 13–34–14 record and a 3.51 GAA. He faced 2,190 shots during the season, a team record which stands to this day. The Sabres improved in 1972–73 and made the playoffs for the first time in their history. In 49 games, Crozier had his first winning record with the Sabres and he posted a much improved 2.76 GAA. In the first round, the Sabres faced the Montreal Canadiens. Crozier played four games and won two, but the Sabres were dispatched in six games.

Still suffering from pancreatitis and now afflicted by ulcers and gallbladder problems, Crozier saw his playing time greatly reduced. In 1974–75, he posted 17 wins and two losses, helping the Sabres rank first in the Adams Division. During the playoffs, Crozier played five games, including two in the Stanley Cup Final. After eliminating the Black Hawks and the Canadiens, the Sabres faced the Philadelphia Flyers in the Stanley Cup Final. Game three of the Finals in Buffalo was known as the "Fog Game"; a heat wave in May hit the arena and with no air conditioning inside, the temperature increased. Fog started to develop and soon visibility decreased. Gerry Desjardins was the starting goaltender but after allowing three goals in the first period, he was replaced by Crozier. Crozier allowed one goal during the rest of the game and helped the Sabres win 5–4 in overtime. With the Sabres trailing in the series 3–2, Crozier was selected to start game six and he shut out the Flyers in the first two periods. Eleven seconds into the third period, Bob Kelly gave the Flyers the lead with his goal off Crozier, and Bill Clement added another goal with less than three minutes to go to seal the victory for Philadelphia. For the third time, Crozier's team lost in the finals.

In 1975–76, Crozier played in only 11 games due to his persisting ailments. The Sabres traded him to the Washington Capitals in exchange for cash on March 3, 1977. He played only three games with the Capitals before retiring after 14 seasons in the NHL.

== Post-career ==
After retiring, Crozier served in the Capitals' front office. He served as interim general manager during the 1981–82 season and served as head coach for one game during the season. Under his watch, the Capitals picked future Hockey Hall of Fame defenceman Scott Stevens in the 1982 NHL entry draft. He left the Capitals in 1983 and moved to Wilmington, Delaware to work at MBNA Bank. He rose to the level of executive vice president and facilities manager of Worldwide Facilities and Construction.

Roger Crozier died after a battle with cancer on January 11, 1996, at the age of 53. He was survived by his wife Janice, and his two daughters, Katie and Brooke. In 2000, the NHL unveiled the Roger Crozier Saving Grace Award, which was given annually to the goaltender who posted the best save percentage in each season from 1999–2000 to 2006–07. The award was co-sponsored by Crozier's last employer, MBNA. In 2009, he was inducted into the Buffalo Sports Hall of Fame.

== Career statistics ==
=== Regular season and playoffs ===
Bold indicates led league

			Regular season									Playoffs
Season	Team	League	GP	W	L	T	MIN	GA	SO	GAA	SV%	GP	W	L	T	MIN	GA	SO	GAA	SV%
1959–60	St. Catharines Teepees	OHA	48	25	19	4	2880	191	1	3.98	—	17	—	—	—	1020	52	0	3.06	—
1959–60	St. Catharines Teepees	M-Cup	—	—	—	—	—	—	—	—	—	14	8	5	1	850	58	0	4.09	—
1960–61	St. Catharines Teepees	OHA	48	18	24	6	2880	204	0	4.25	—	6	—	—	—	360	21	0	3.50	—
1960–61	Buffalo Bisons	AHL	3	2	0	0	130	5	0	2.31	—	—	—	—	—	—	—	—	—	—
1961–62	St. Catharines Teepees	OHA	45	—	—	—	2670	174	1	3.91	—	6	—	—	—	360	19	0	3.17	—
1961–62	Sault Ste. Marie Thunderbirds	EPHL	3	0	1	2	180	12	0	4.00	—	—	—	—	—	—	—	—	—	—
1961–62	Buffalo Bisons	AHL	1	0	1	0	60	0	4.00	—	—	—	—	—	—	—	—	—	—
1962–63	St. Louis Braves	EPHL	70	26	35	9	4200	299	1	4.27	—	—	—	—	—	—	—	—	—	—
1962–63	Buffalo Bisons	AHL	4	3	1	0	240	10	0	2.50	—	—	—	—	—	—	—	—	—	—
1963–64	Pittsburgh Hornets	AHL	44	30	13	1	2640	103	4	2.34	—	3	1	2	—	184	9	0	2.93	—
1963–64	Detroit Red Wings	NHL	15	5	6	4	900	51	2	3.40	.900	3	0	2	—	126	5	0	2.38	.906
1964–65	Detroit Red Wings	NHL	**70**	**40**	22	7	**4168**	**168**	**6**	2.42	.912	7	3	4	—	420	23	0	3.29	.877
1965–66	Detroit Red Wings	NHL	**64**	27	**25**	**12**	3734	**173**	**6**	2.78	.903	**12**	6	**5**	—	**667**	**26**	**1**	2.34	.914
1966–67	Detroit Red Wings	NHL	58	22	**28**	4	3256	**182**	4	3.35	.895	—	—	—	—	—	—	—	—	—
1967–68	Fort Worth Wings	CHL	5	3	1	0	265	12	0	2.49	.909	—	—	—	—	—	—	—	—	—
1967–68	Detroit Red Wings	NHL	34	9	18	2	1729	95	1	3.30	.890	—	—	—	—	—	—	—	—	—
1968–69	Detroit Red Wings	NHL	38	12	16	3	1820	101	0	3.33	.897	—	—	—	—	—	—	—	—	—
1969–70	Detroit Red Wings	NHL	34	16	6	9	1877	83	0	2.65	.920	1	0	1	—	34	3	0	5.29	.813
1970–71	Buffalo Sabres	NHL	44	9	20	7	2198	135	1	3.68	.899	—	—	—	—	—	—	—	—	—
1971–72	Buffalo Sabres	NHL	63	13	**34**	14	3654	**214**	2	3.51	.902	—	—	—	—	—	—	—	—	—
1972–73	Buffalo Sabres	NHL	49	23	13	7	2633	121	3	2.76	.905	4	2	2	—	249	11	0	2.65	.904
1973–74	Buffalo Sabres	NHL	12	4	5	0	615	39	0	3.80	.875	—	—	—	—	—	—	—	—	—
1974–75	Buffalo Sabres	NHL	23	17	2	1	1260	55	3	2.62	.905	5	3	2	—	292	14	0	2.88	.903
1975–76	Buffalo Sabres	NHL	11	8	2	0	620	27	1	2.61	.888	—	—	—	—	—	—	—	—	—
1976–77	Washington Capitals	NHL	3	1	0	0	103	2	0	1.17	.967	—	—	—	—	—	—	—	—	—
NHL totals			518	206	197	70	28,567	1446	30	3.04	.902	32	14	16	—	1789	82	1	2.75	.900

"Roger Crozier's stats". The Goaltender Home Page.

== Awards ==
OHA

Award	Year(s)
Memorial Cup	1960
OHA First All-Star Team	1960, 1961, 1962

AHL

Award	Year(s)
AHL Second All-Star Team	1964
Dudley "Red" Garrett Memorial Award	1964
Harry "Hap" Holmes Memorial Award	1964

NHL

Award	Year(s)
Calder Memorial Trophy	1965
Conn Smythe Trophy	1966
NHL First All-Star Team	1965

Preceded by Jean Beliveau	Winner of the Conn Smythe Trophy; 1966	Succeeded by Dave Keon
Preceded by Jacques Laperriere	Winner of the Calder Memorial Trophy; 1965	Succeeded by Brit Selby
Preceded by Max McNab	General manager of the Washington Capitals; 1981–82	Succeeded by David Poile
Preceded by Gary Green	Head coach of the Washington Capitals; 1-game 1981	Succeeded by Bryan Murray
