= 1960 Stanley Cup playoffs =

NHL postseason tournament

Tournament details
- Dates: March 23 – April 14, 1960
- Teams: 4
- Defending champions: Montreal Canadiens

Final positions
- Champions: Montreal Canadiens
- Runners-up: Toronto Maple Leafs

Tournament statistics
- Scoring leader(s): Henri Richard (Canadiens) & Bernie Geoffrion (Canadiens) (12 points)

The 1960 Stanley Cup playoffs was the playoff tournament of the National Hockey League (NHL) for the 1959–60 season. The Montreal Canadiens played the minimum number eight games (at-the-time) to become the last Stanley Cup winners in NHL history to go perfect in the playoffs to date. After winning the Cup, Maurice Richard retired from the NHL as a champion.

== Playoff seeds ==
The top four out of the six teams in the league qualified for the playoffs:

1. Montreal Canadiens – 92 points
2. Toronto Maple Leafs – 79 points
3. Chicago Black Hawks – 69 points
4. Detroit Red Wings – 67 points

== Playoff bracket ==
In each round, teams competed in a best-of-seven series (scores in the bracket indicate the number of games won in each best-of-seven series). In the semifinals, the first-place team played the third-place team, while the second-place team played the fourth-place team. The winners of the semifinals then played for the Stanley Cup.

Semifinals
1	Montreal	4
3	Chicago	0
2	Toronto	4
4	Detroit	2

Stanley Cup Finals
1	Montreal	4
2	Toronto	0

== Semifinals ==
=== (1) Montreal Canadiens vs. (3) Chicago Black Hawks ===
Bobby Hull of the Chicago Black Hawks had led the league in scoring, but the Montreal Canadiens managed to hold him to only one goal as the Canadiens swept the Black Hawks in four.

March 24	Chicago Black Hawks	3–4	Montreal Canadiens	Montreal Forum	Recap
Murray Balfour (1) – 16:15		First period	11:05 – Jean Beliveau (1); 15:04 – Andre Pronovost (1)
Ted Lindsay (1) – 16:18		Second period	08:45 – pp – Dickie Moore (1)
Ron Murphy (1) – 18:17		Third period	10:32 – Bernie Geoffrion (1)
Glenn Hall 28 saves / 32 shots		Goalie stats	Jacques Plante 19 saves / 22 shots

March 26	Chicago Black Hawks	3–4	OT	Montreal Canadiens	Montreal Forum	Recap
Kenny Wharram (1) – 13:13		First period		11:38 – Dickie Moore (2)
No scoring		Second period		17:55 – Marcel Bonin (1)
Bobby Hull (1) – 02:34; Bill Hay (1) – 18:58		Third period		08:35 – pp – Dickie Moore (3)
No scoring		First overtime period		08:38 – Doug Harvey (1)
Glenn Hall 36 saves / 40 shots		Goalie stats		Jacques Plante 28 saves / 31 shots

March 29	Montreal Canadiens	4–0	Chicago Black Hawks	Chicago Stadium	Recap
No scoring		First period	No scoring
Bill Hicke (1) – 10:15; Jean-Guy Talbot (1)		Second period	No scoring
Donnie Marshall (1) – 09:39; Bernie Geoffrion (2) – 18:04		Third period	No scoring
Jacques Plante 23 saves / 23 shots		Goalie stats	Glenn Hall 23 saves / 27 shots

March 31	Montreal Canadiens	2–0	Chicago Black Hawks	Chicago Stadium	Recap
No scoring		First period	No scoring
Claude Provost (1) – 04:47; Dickie Moore (4) – 13:09		Second period	No scoring
No scoring		Third period	No scoring
Jacques Plante 25 saves / 25 shots		Goalie stats	Glenn Hall 29 saves / 31 shots

Montreal won series 4–0

=== (2) Toronto Maple Leafs vs. (4) Detroit Red Wings ===
Gordie Howe led the Detroit Red Wings as it took the Toronto Maple Leafs in 6 games, including one in triple overtime, to win the series.

March 23	Detroit Red Wings	2–1	Toronto Maple Leafs	Maple Leaf Gardens	Recap
Gordie Howe (1) – 02:38; Len Haley (1) – 14:24		First period	No scoring
No scoring		Second period	No scoring
No scoring		Third period	16:04 – Carl Brewer (1)
Terry Sawchuck 18 saves / 19 shots		Goalie stats	Johnny Bower 28 saves / 30 shots

March 26	Detroit Red Wings	2–4	Toronto Maple Leafs	Maple Leaf Gardens	Recap
Pete Goegan (1) – 16:12		First period	13:37 – George Armstrong (1)
No scoring		Second period	17:04 – Larry Regan (1)
Alex Delvecchio (1) – 05:50		Third period	04:02 – Frank Mahovlich (1); 19:13 – en – Bob Pulford (1)
Terry Sawchuck 28 saves / 31 shots		Goalie stats	Johnny Bower 35 saves / 37 shots

March 27	Toronto Maple Leafs	5–4	3OT	Detroit Red Wings	Olympia Stadium	Recap
No scoring		First period		16:57 – pp – Norm Ullman (1); 17:18 – Marcel Pronovost (1)
Red Kelly (1) – 03:35; Dick Duff (1) – 07:00; Bob Pulford (2) – 08:05; Red Kelly (2) – pp – 19:24		Second period		16:58 – pp – Len Lunde (1)
No scoring		Third period		12:40 – Gerry Melnyk (1)
Frank Mahovlich (2) – 03:00		Third overtime period		No scoring
Johnny Bower 62 saves / 66 shots		Goalie stats		Terry Sawchuck 47 saves / 52 shots

March 29	Toronto Maple Leafs	1–2	OT	Detroit Red Wings	Olympia Stadium	Recap
No scoring		First period		13:15 – Gary Aldcorn (1)
Carl Brewer (2) – 10:29		Second period		No scoring
No scoring		Third period		No scoring
No scoring		First overtime period		01:54 – pp – Gerry Melnyk (2)
Johnny Bower 31 saves / 33 shots		Goalie stats		Terry Sawchuck 20 saves / 21 shots

April 2	Detroit Red Wings	4–5	Toronto Maple Leafs	Maple Leaf Gardens	Recap
No scoring		First period	05:14 – pp – Allan Stanley (1); 09:05 – pp – Bert Olmstead (1)
Warren Godfrey (1) – 10:32; Gerry Melnyk (3) – 11:56		Second period	12:45 – Allan Stanley (2)
Jack McIntyre (1) – 08:36; Alex Delvecchio (2) – 19:19		Third period	04:32 – Red Kelly (3); 12:10 – Larry Regan (2)
Terry Sawchuck 26 saves / 31 shots		Goalie stats	Johnny Bower 28 saves / 32 shots

April 3	Toronto Maple Leafs	4–2	Detroit Red Wings	Olympia Stadium	Recap
Bob Pulford (3) – 19:19		First period	05:26 – Murray Oliver (1)
No scoring		Second period	00:57 – pp – Norm Ullman (2)
Bob Pulford (4) – 00:37; Frank Mahovlich (3) – 02:40; Dick Duff (2) – 17:06		Third period	No scoring
Johnny Bower 28 saves / 30 shots		Goalie stats	Terry Sawchuck 30 saves / 34 shots

Toronto won series 4–2

== Finals ==
April 7	Toronto Maple Leafs	2–4	Montreal Canadiens	Montreal Forum	Recap
No scoring		First period	02:27 – pp – Dickie Moore (5); 08:55 – Doug Harvey (2); 11:56 – Jean Beliveau (2)
Bob Baun (1) – 05:23; Bert Olmstead (2) – 17:35		Second period	No scoring
No scoring		Third period	01:30 – Henri Richard (1)
Johnny Bower 38 saves / 42 shots		Goalie stats	Jacques Plante 27 saves / 29 shots

April 9	Toronto Maple Leafs	1–2	Montreal Canadiens	Montreal Forum	Recap
Larry Regan (3) – 19:32		First period	01:26 – Dickie Moore (6); 05:56 – Jean Beliveau (3)
No scoring		Second period	No scoring
No scoring		Third period	No scoring
Johnny Bower 34 saves / 36 shots		Goalie stats	Jacques Plante 26 saves / 27 shots

April 12	Montreal Canadiens	5–2	Toronto Maple Leafs	Maple Leaf Gardens	Recap
Donnie Marshall (2) – 13:54		First period	No scoring
Phil Goyette (1) – 00:21; Henri Richard (2) – 15:27		Second period	16:19 – Johnny Wilson (1)
Phil Goyette (2) – 08:57; Maurice Richard (1) – 10:07		Third period	19:47 – pp – Bert Olmstead (3)
Jacques Plante 32 saves / 34 shots		Goalie stats	Johnny Bower 26 saves / 31 shots

April 14	Montreal Canadiens	4–0	Toronto Maple Leafs	Maple Leaf Gardens	Recap
Jean Beliveau (4) – 08:16; Doug Harvey (3) – 08:45		First period	No scoring
Henri Richard (3) – 16:40		Second period	No scoring
Jean Beliveau (5) – 01:21		Third period	No scoring
Jacques Plante 30 saves / 30 shots		Goalie stats	Johnny Bower 28 saves / 32 shots

Montreal won series 4–0

== Leading scorers ==
Note: GP = Games played; G = Goals; A = Assists; Pts = Points

Player	Team	GP	G	A	Pts
Henri Richard	Montreal Canadiens	8	3	9	12
Bernie Geoffrion	Montreal Canadiens	8	2	10	12
Red Kelly	Toronto Maple Leafs	10	3	8	11
Dickie Moore	Montreal Canadiens	8	6	4	10
Alex Delvecchio	Detroit Red Wings	6	2	6	8
Jean Beliveau	Montreal Canadiens	8	5	2	7
Bert Olmstead	Toronto Maple Leafs	10	3	4	7

== See also ==
- 1959–60 NHL season
- 1960 in sports

Preceded by 1959 Stanley Cup playoffs	Stanley Cup playoffs	Succeeded by 1961 Stanley Cup playoffs
