= 1960 Stanley Cup Final =

1960 ice hockey championship series

	1	2	3	4	Total
Montreal Canadiens	4	2	5	4	4
Toronto Maple Leafs	2	1	2	0	0
- Location(s): Montreal: Montreal Forum (1, 2); Toronto: Maple Leaf Gardens (3, 4)
- Coaches: Montreal: Toe Blake; Toronto: Punch Imlach
- Captains: Montreal: Maurice Richard; Toronto: George Armstrong
- Dates: April 7–14, 1960
- Series-winning goal: Jean Beliveau (8:16, first)
- Hall of Famers: Canadiens: Jean Beliveau (1972); Bernie Geoffrion (1972); Doug Harvey (1973); Tom Johnson (1970); Dickie Moore (1974); Jacques Plante (1978); Henri Richard (1979); Maurice Richard (1961); Maple Leafs: George Armstrong (1975); Johnny Bower (1976); Dick Duff (2006); Tim Horton (1977); Red Kelly (1969); Frank Mahovlich (1981); Bert Olmstead (1985); Bob Pulford (1991); Allan Stanley (1981); Coaches: Toe Blake (1966, player); Punch Imlach (1984); Officials: Neil Armstrong (1991); George Hayes (1988); Frank Udvari (1973)

The 1960 Stanley Cup Final was the championship series of the National Hockey League's (NHL) 1959–60 season, and the culmination of the 1960 Stanley Cup playoffs. It was contested between the four-time defending champion Montreal Canadiens, appearing in their tenth consecutive finals, and the Toronto Maple Leafs; it was a rematch of the previous year's finals and the fourth finals meeting in the history of the Canadiens–Maple Leafs rivalry. The Canadiens swept the Maple Leafs for their fifth straight Cup victory, which stands as an NHL record.

This was the last time a Toronto-based team lost in the championship round in any of the four major North American sports leagues until the 2025 World Series.

== Paths to the finals ==
Montreal swept the Chicago Black Hawks in four games to reach the Final. In the other semi-final, Toronto defeated the Detroit Red Wings four games to two.

== Game summaries ==
Montreal swept the Maple Leafs, outscoring them 15–5, en route to being the first team since the 1952 Detroit Red Wings to go perfect in the playoffs, with Jean Beliveau scoring the game-winning goal in three of the matches. The Red Wings beat both the Leafs and Habs in the 1952 playoffs to set the record.

Maurice "Rocket" Richard retired after the series in style, finishing with his 34th final-series goal, his 82nd and final goal, and his last-ever goal (626th) in the third game.

This was the last time a Toronto-based team lost a championship series in any of the "big four" major professional sports leagues until the 2025 World Series. The Leafs would go on to appear in and win four more Stanley Cup Final in the 1960s, which included a three-peat from 1962 to 1964, and their most recent Finals appearance and win in 1967. The Toronto Blue Jays (who joined Major League Baseball in 1977) then appeared in and won the World Series in 1992 and 1993, while the Toronto Raptors (who joined the National Basketball Association in 1995) won their first NBA championship in 2019.

=== Game one ===
April 7	Toronto Maple Leafs	2–4	Montreal Canadiens	Montreal Forum	Recap

Scoring summary
Period	Team	Goal	Assist(s)	Time	Score
1st	MTL	Dickie Moore (5) – pp	Henri Richard (5) and Bernie Geoffrion (5)	02:27	1–0 MTL
1st	MTL	Doug Harvey (2)	Henri Richard (6)	08:55	2–0 MTL
1st	MTL	Jean Beliveau (2)	Bernie Geoffrion (6) and Henri Richard (7)	11:56	3–0 MTL
2nd	TOR	Bobby Baun (1)	George Armstrong (5) and Larry Regan (3)	05:23	3–1 MTL
2nd	TOR	Bert Olmstead (2)	Red Kelly (7) and Tim Horton (1)	17:35	3–2 MTL
3rd	MTL	Henri Richard (1)	Dickie Moore (2) and Bernie Geoffrion (7)	01:30	4–2 MTL
Penalty summary
Period	Team	Player	Penalty	Time	PIM
1st	TOR	Gerry Ehman	Hooking	01:59	2:00
1st	MTL	Doug Harvey	Hooking	02:42	2:00
1st	TOR	Carl Brewer	Hooking	05:10	2:00
1st	MTL	Marcel Bonin	Tripping	06:32	2:00
1st	MTL	Tom Johnson	Boarding	08:18	2:00
1st	TOR	Bob Pulford	Slashing	08:18	2:00
1st	MTL	Henri Richard	Boarding	09:40	2:00
1st	TOR	Bobby Baun	Boarding	13:01	2:00
1st	MTL	Jean Beliveau	Cross-checking	14:56	2:00
2nd	TOR	Bobby Baun	Holding	01:57	2:00
2nd	MTL	Phil Goyette	Tripping	05:56	2:00
2nd	TOR	Johnny Wilson	Tripping	11:25	2:00
2nd	TOR	George Armstrong	Slashing	19:22	2:00
3rd	TOR	Dick Duff	Tripping	02:19	2:00
3rd	TOR	Bobby Baun	Tripping	06:26	2:00
3rd	MTL	Marcel Bonin	Spearing	09:03	2:00
3rd	MTL	Maurice Richard	Tripping	11:59	2:00

Shots by period
Team	1	2	3	Total
Toronto	14	6	9	29
Montreal	12	18	12	42

=== Game two ===
April 9	Toronto Maple Leafs	1–2	Montreal Canadiens	Montreal Forum	Recap

Scoring summary
Period	Team	Goal	Assist(s)	Time	Score
1st	MTL	Dickie Moore (6)	Maurice Richard (2) and Henri Richard (8)	01:26	1–0 MTL
1st	MTL	Jean Beliveau (3)	Jean-Guy Talbot (1) and Marcel Bonin (3)	05:56	2–0 MTL
1st	TOR	Larry Regan (3)	George Armstrong (4) and Dick Duff (4)	19:32	2–1 MTL
2nd	None				
3rd	None				
Penalty summary
Period	Team	Player	Penalty	Time	PIM
1st	MTL	Marcel Bonin	Charging	09:55	2:00
1st	MTL	Doug Harvey	Interference	11:53	2:00
1st	TOR	Bobby Baun	Interference	15:13	2:00
2nd	TOR	Carl Brewer	Holding	11:18	2:00
2nd	MTL	Doug Harvey	Charging	19:54	2:00
2nd	TOR	Bob Pulford	Charging	19:54	2:00
3rd	None				

Shots by period
Team	1	2	3	Total
Toronto	11	9	7	27
Montreal	10	18	8	36

=== Game three ===
April 12	Montreal Canadiens	5–2	Toronto Maple Leafs	Maple Leaf Gardens	Recap

Scoring summary
Period	Team	Goal	Assist(s)	Time	Score
1st	MTL	Donnie Marshall (2)	Bill Hicke (2)	13:54	1–0 MTL
2nd	MTL	Phil Goyette (1)	Claude Provost (1) and Andre Pronovost (2)	00:21	2–0 MTL
2nd	MTL	Henri Richard (2)	Unassisted	15:27	3–0 MTL
2nd	TOR	Johnny Wilson (3)	Billy Harris (4) and Carl Brewer (3)	16:19	3–1 MTL
2nd	MTL	Phil Goyette (2)	Unassisted	08:57	4–1 MTL
2nd	MTL	Maurice Richard (1)	Henri Richard (9) and Dickie Moore (3)	10:07	5–1 MTL
2nd	TOR	Bert Olmstead (3) – pp	Red Kelly (8) and Garry Edmundson (3)	19:47	5–2 MTL
Penalty summary
Period	Team	Player	Penalty	Time	PIM
1st	MTL	Jean-Guy Talbot	Tripping	07:27	2:00
1st	TOR	Garry Edmundson	High-sticking	19:17	2:00
2nd	MTL	Ralph Backstrom	Tripping	10:26	2:00
2nd	MTL	Henri Richard	Fighting – major	16:19	5:00
2nd	TOR	Bobby Baun	Fighting – major	16:19	5:00
3rd	TOR	Bobby Baun	Holding	02:48	2:00
3rd	TOR	Carl Brewer	Tripping	06:53	2:00
3rd	MTL	Henri Richard	Hooking	18:33	2:00

Shots by period
Team	1	2	3	Total
Montreal	9	12	10	31
Toronto	12	12	10	34

=== Game four ===
April 14	Montreal Canadiens	4–0	Toronto Maple Leafs	Maple Leaf Gardens	Recap

Scoring summary
Period	Team	Goal	Assist(s)	Time	Score
1st	MTL	Jean Beliveau (4)	Al Langlois (2) and Bernie Geoffrion (8)	08:16	1–0 MTL
1st	MTL	Doug Harvey (3)	Bernie Geoffrion (9) and Al Langlois (3)	08:45	2–0 MTL
2nd	MTL	Henri Richard (3)	Maurice Richard (3) and Dickie Moore (4)	16:40	3–0 MTL
3rd	MTL	Jean Beliveau (5)	Marcel Bonin (4) and Bernie Geoffrion (10)	01:21	4–0 MTL
Penalty summary
Period	Team	Player	Penalty	Time	PIM
1st	MTL	Dickie Moore	Holding	03:28	2:00
1st	TOR	Bobby Baun	Elbowing	09:13	2:00
1st	TOR	Red Kelly	Holding	09:53	2:00
1st	TOR	Bob Pulford	Holding	10:47	2:00
1st	MTL	Jean Beliveau	Charging	17:09	2:00
2nd	MTL	Jean-Guy Talbot	Hooking	03:57	2:00
2nd	MTL	Al Langlois	Hooking	08:50	2:00
2nd	TOR	Al Langlois	Misconduct	08:50	10:00
2nd	TOR	Bob Pulford	Hooking	12:44	2:00
3rd	None				

Shots by period
Team	1	2	3	Total
Montreal	10	11	11	32
Toronto	10	11	9	30

== Stanley Cup engraving ==
The 1960 Stanley Cup was presented to Canadiens captain Maurice Richard by NHL President Clarence Campbell following the Canadiens 4–0 win over the Maple Leafs in game four.

The following Canadiens players and staff had their names engraved on the Stanley Cup

1959–60 Montreal Canadiens

=== Players ===
Centres

- 4 Jean Beliveau
- 6 Ralph Backstrom
- 16 Henri Richard
- 20 Phil Goyette

Wingers

- 5 Bernie Geoffrion (A)
- 9 Maurice "Rocket" Richard (Captain)
- 12 Dickie Moore
- 14 Claude Provost
- 15 Alvin Ab McDonald
- 18 Marcel Bonin
- 22 Don Marshall
- 23 Andre Pronovost

Defencemen

- 2 Doug Harvey (A)
- 8 Bill Hicke
- 10 Tom Johnson (A)
- 11 Bob Turner
- 17 Jean-Guy Talbot
- 19 Albert Langlois

Goaltenders

- 1 Jacques Plante
- 1 Charlie Hodge (Sub)

=== Coaching and administrative staff ===
- Hartland Molson (President/Owner)
- Frank Selke Sr. (Manager), Ken Reardon (Vice President)
- Sam Pollock (Personnel Director), Toe Blake (Coach)
- Hector Dubois (Trainer)
- Larry Aubut (Asst. Trainer)
- Camile DesRoches*, Frank Selke Jr.* (Publicity Directors)
- * On the team picture, but missing from the Stanley Cup.

=== Stanley Cup engraving ===
- Camile DesRoches, Frank Selke Jr. (Publicity Directors) are part of all six team winning pictures 1953, 1956, 1957, 1958, 1959, 1960. However, their names do not appear on the Stanley Cup.
- Dickie Moore won six Stanley Cups. His name was spelled differently 5 times. 1953, 1957 as Dickie MOORE, 1956 D MOORE, 1958 R MOORE, 1959 RICHARD MOORE, 1960 RICH MOORE. On the Replica Cup, Moore's name appears as DICKIE MOORE in 1953, 1957, 1959, 1960, D. MOORE in 1956, and R. Moore in 1958.
- Jacques Plante won six Stanley Cups. His name was spelled differently 4 times. 1953, 1957, 1960 Jacques Plante, 1956 J Plante, 1958 Jac Plante, 1959 Jacq Plante. On the Replica Cup, Plante's name appears as JACQUES PLANTE in 1953, 1957, 1958, 1959, 1960, and J. PLANTE in 1956.
- In 1959, the Montreal Canadiens engraved 29 names on the Stanley Cup; only 27 names were engraved on the Cup in 1960. Every person engraved on the Cup in 1960 was included on the Cup with Montreal in 1959. The only changes in the lineup where with Ian Cushnan and Ken Mosdell were no longer with the team, but were playing in the minors. The only other time in Stanley Cup history that no member engraved on the Cup was a first-time winner was in 1972.

=== Members of Montreal Canadiens Five Straight Dynasty 1956 to 1960 ===
Jean Beliveau, Bernie Geoffrion*, Doug Harvey*, Tom Johnson*, Don Marshall, Dickie Moore*, Jacques Plante*, Claude Provost, Henri Richard, Maurice Richard*, Jean-Guy Talbot, Bob Turner (twelve players), Frank Selke Sr*, Ken Reardon, Toe Blake, Hector Dubois* (four non-players).

- * Also won the Stanley Cup in 1953. Bernie Geoffrion is the only player who appeared in every game of the Stanley Cup Final from 1951 to 1960.

== See also ==
- List of Stanley Cup champions

== Notes ==
Preceded by Montreal Canadiens; 1959	Montreal Canadiens; Stanley Cup champions 1960	Succeeded by Chicago Black Hawks; 1961
