= 1959–60 Detroit Red Wings season =

National Hockey League team season

1959–60 Detroit Red Wings
- League: 4th NHL
- 1959–60 record: 26–29–15
- Home record: 18–14–3
- Road record: 8–15–12
- Goals for: 186
- Goals against: 197

Team information
- General manager: Jack Adams
- Coach: Sid Abel
- Captain: Gordie Howe
- Alternate captains: Alex Delvecchio; Red Kelly; Marcel Pronovost
- Arena: Detroit Olympia

Team leaders
- Goals: Gordie Howe (28)
- Assists: Gordie Howe (29)
- Points: Gordie Howe (73)
- Penalty minutes: Jim Morrison (62)
- Wins: Terry Sawchuk (24)
- Goals against average: Terry Sawchuk (2.67)

The 1959–60 Detroit Red Wings season saw the Red Wings finish in fourth place in the National Hockey League (NHL) with a record of 26 wins, 29 losses, and 15 ties for 67 points. They lost in the Semi-finals to the Toronto Maple Leafs, four games to two.

== Regular season ==
=== Final standings ===
National Hockey League
		GP	W	L	T	GF	GA	DIFF	Pts
1	Montreal Canadiens	70	40	18	12	255	178	+77	92
2	Toronto Maple Leafs	70	35	26	9	199	195	+4	79
3	Chicago Black Hawks	70	28	29	13	191	180	+11	69
4	Detroit Red Wings	70	26	29	15	186	197	−11	67
5	Boston Bruins	70	28	34	8	220	241	−21	64
6	New York Rangers	70	17	38	15	187	247	−60	49

=== Record vs. opponents ===
1959–60 NHL Records
Team	BOS	CHI	DET	MTL	NYR	TOR
Boston	—	5–6–3	5–8–1	4–8	8–4–2	6–6–2
Chicago	6–5–3	—	4–8–2	3–7–4	11–1–2	4–8–2
Detroit	8–5–1	8–4–2	—	2–7–5	4–6–4	4–9–1
Montreal	8–4	7–3–4	7–2–5	—	6–6–2	10–3–1
New York	4–8–2	1–11–2	6–4–4	6–6–2	—	2–9–3
Toronto	6–6–2	8–4–2	9–4–1	3–10–1	9–2–3	—

== Schedule and results ==
1959–60 regular season
October

Game	Result	Date	Score	Opponent	Record
1	T	October 10, 1959	1–1	@ Montreal Canadiens (1959–60)	0–0–1
2	W	October 11, 1959	4–2	New York Rangers (1959–60)	1–0–1
3	W	October 14, 1959	2–0	@ Chicago Black Hawks (1959–60)	2–0–1
4	W	October 15, 1959	2–1	Chicago Black Hawks (1959–60)	3–0–1
5	W	October 18, 1959	3–0	Toronto Maple Leafs (1959–60)	4–0–1
6	W	October 22, 1959	4–1	Boston Bruins (1959–60)	5–0–1
7	L	October 25, 1959	1–2	Montreal Canadiens (1959–60)	5–1–1
8	T	October 28, 1959	3–3	@ New York Rangers (1959–60)	5–1–2
9	L	October 29, 1959	1–2	@ Boston Bruins (1959–60)	5–2–2
10	T	October 31, 1959	2–2	@ Montreal Canadiens (1959–60)	5–2–3

November

Game	Result	Date	Score	Opponent	Record
11	W	November 1, 1959	2–1	Chicago Black Hawks (1959–60)	6–2–3
12	L	November 5, 1959	3–8	Boston Bruins (1959–60)	6–3–3
13	T	November 7, 1959	2–2	@ Toronto Maple Leafs (1959–60)	6–3–4
14	T	November 8, 1959	3–3	New York Rangers (1959–60)	6–3–5
15	W	November 12, 1959	6–5	@ Boston Bruins (1959–60)	7–3–5
16	W	November 14, 1959	4–0	@ New York Rangers (1959–60)	8–3–5
17	L	November 15, 1959	3–5	@ Chicago Black Hawks (1959–60)	8–4–5
18	W	November 16, 1959	3–2	Chicago Black Hawks (1959–60)	9–4–5
19	L	November 18, 1959	2–3	@ Toronto Maple Leafs (1959–60)	9–5–5
20	T	November 21, 1959	3–3	@ Boston Bruins (1959–60)	9–5–6
21	W	November 22, 1959	5–3	@ New York Rangers (1959–60)	10–5–6
22	L	November 26, 1959	2–4	Montreal Canadiens (1959–60)	10–6–6
23	L	November 28, 1959	0–1	@ Montreal Canadiens (1959–60)	10–7–6
24	L	November 29, 1959	1–4	Toronto Maple Leafs (1959–60)	10–8–6

December

Game	Result	Date	Score	Opponent	Record
25	W	December 5, 1959	4–3	Boston Bruins (1959–60)	11–8–6
26	T	December 6, 1959	4–4	Montreal Canadiens (1959–60)	11–8–7
27	W	December 9, 1959	2–0	@ Chicago Black Hawks (1959–60)	12–8–7
28	W	December 12, 1959	3–2	@ Montreal Canadiens (1959–60)	13–8–7
29	W	December 13, 1959	4–2	Toronto Maple Leafs (1959–60)	14–8–7
30	W	December 17, 1959	3–2	Chicago Black Hawks (1959–60)	15–8–7
31	L	December 19, 1959	2–4	@ Toronto Maple Leafs (1959–60)	15–9–7
32	W	December 20, 1959	4–2	@ Boston Bruins (1959–60)	16–9–7
33	L	December 25, 1959	2–5	New York Rangers (1959–60)	16–10–7
34	L	December 27, 1959	1–3	Montreal Canadiens (1959–60)	16–11–7
35	L	December 31, 1959	2–4	Toronto Maple Leafs (1959–60)	16–12–7

January

Game	Result	Date	Score	Opponent	Record
36	T	January 1, 1960	4–4	@ Chicago Black Hawks (1959–60)	16–12–8
37	W	January 3, 1960	4–3	Boston Bruins (1959–60)	17–12–8
38	L	January 6, 1960	1–3	@ Toronto Maple Leafs (1959–60)	17–13–8
39	T	January 9, 1960	3–3	@ New York Rangers (1959–60)	17–13–9
40	L	January 10, 1960	3–4	New York Rangers (1959–60)	17–14–9
41	L	January 13, 1960	2–5	@ Chicago Black Hawks (1959–60)	17–15–9
42	W	January 16, 1960	3–1	Chicago Black Hawks (1959–60)	18–15–9
43	W	January 17, 1960	4–3	Toronto Maple Leafs (1959–60)	19–15–9
44	W	January 21, 1960	5–2	Boston Bruins (1959–60)	20–15–9
45	L	January 23, 1960	2–4	@ Montreal Canadiens (1959–60)	20–16–9
46	T	January 24, 1960	2–2	New York Rangers (1959–60)	20–16–10
47	L	January 28, 1960	2–4	Montreal Canadiens (1959–60)	20–17–10
48	L	January 30, 1960	2–3	@ Boston Bruins (1959–60)	20–18–10
49	T	January 31, 1960	3–3	@ New York Rangers (1959–60)	20–18–11

February

Game	Result	Date	Score	Opponent	Record
50	L	February 4, 1960	1–3	New York Rangers (1959–60)	20–19–11
51	L	February 6, 1960	4–6	@ Toronto Maple Leafs (1959–60)	20–20–11
52	W	February 7, 1960	5–0	Chicago Black Hawks (1959–60)	21–20–11
53	L	February 11, 1960	2–3	@ Boston Bruins (1959–60)	21–21–11
54	L	February 13, 1960	1–7	@ Toronto Maple Leafs (1959–60)	21–22–11
55	L	February 14, 1960	1–3	Toronto Maple Leafs (1959–60)	21–23–11
56	T	February 18, 1960	3–3	@ Montreal Canadiens (1959–60)	21–23–12
57	W	February 20, 1960	4–1	Boston Bruins (1959–60)	22–23–12
58	L	February 21, 1960	3–6	Montreal Canadiens (1959–60)	22–24–12
59	T	February 24, 1960	2–2	@ New York Rangers (1959–60)	22–24–13
60	W	February 27, 1960	4–3	@ Toronto Maple Leafs (1959–60)	23–24–13
61	L	February 28, 1960	2–5	@ Chicago Black Hawks (1959–60)	23–25–13

March

Game	Result	Date	Score	Opponent	Record
62	W	March 1, 1960	3–2	Boston Bruins (1959–60)	24–25–13
63	T	March 5, 1960	2–2	@ Montreal Canadiens (1959–60)	24–25–14
64	L	March 6, 1960	1–3	@ New York Rangers (1959–60)	24–26–14
65	W	March 8, 1960	3–0	Montreal Canadiens (1959–60)	25–26–14
66	L	March 12, 1960	1–5	@ Boston Bruins (1959–60)	25–27–14
67	T	March 13, 1960	1–1	@ Chicago Black Hawks (1959–60)	25–27–15
68	L	March 15, 1960	2–3	Chicago Black Hawks (1959–60)	25–28–15
69	W	March 19, 1960	6–3	New York Rangers (1959–60)	26–28–15
70	L	March 20, 1960	2–3	Toronto Maple Leafs (1959–60)	26–29–15

Legend: Win (2 points) Loss (0 points) Tie (1 point)

== Player statistics ==
=== Regular season ===
Scoring

Player	Pos	GP	G	A	Pts	PIM
Gordie Howe	RW	70	28	45	73	46
Norm Ullman	C	70	24	34	58	46
Gary Aldcorn	LW	70	22	29	51	32
Alex Delvecchio	C/LW	70	19	28	47	8
Murray Oliver	C	54	20	19	39	16
Jim Morrison	D	70	3	23	26	62
Marcel Pronovost	D	69	7	17	24	38
Len Lunde	C	66	6	17	23	10
Gerry Melnyk	C	63	10	10	20	12
John McKenzie	RW	59	8	12	20	50
Red Kelly	D/C	50	6	12	18	10
Billy McNeill	RW	47	5	13	18	33
Jack McIntyre	D	49	8	7	15	6
Warren Godfrey	D	69	5	9	14	60
Barry Cullen	RW	55	4	9	13	23
Val Fonteyne	LW	69	4	7	11	2
Brian Smith	LW	31	2	5	7	2
Pete Goegan	D	21	3	0	3	6
Len Haley	RW	27	1	2	3	12
Forbes Kennedy	C	17	1	2	3	8
Lou Marcon	D	38	0	3	3	30
Marc Reaume	D	9	0	1	1	2
Gilles Boisvert	G	3	0	0	0	0
Lloyd Haddon	D	8	0	0	0	2
Stu McNeill	C	5	0	0	0	0
Dennis Riggin	G	9	0	0	0	0
Terry Sawchuk	G	58	0	0	0	22
Bob Solinger	W	1	0	0	0	0

Goaltending

Player	MIN	GP	W	L	T	GA	GAA	SO
Terry Sawchuk	3480	58	24	20	14	155	2.67	5
Dennis Riggin	540	9	2	6	1	30	3.33	1
Gilles Boisvert	180	3	0	3	0	9	3.00	0
Team:	4200	70	26	29	15	194	2.77	6

=== Playoffs ===
Scoring

Player	Pos	GP	G	A	Pts	PIM
Alex Delvecchio	C/LW	6	2	6	8	0
Gordie Howe	RW	6	1	5	6	4
Norm Ullman	C	6	2	2	4	0
Len Haley	RW	6	1	3	4	6
Val Fonteyne	LW	6	0	4	4	0
Gerry Melnyk	C	6	3	0	3	0
Gary Aldcorn	LW	6	1	2	3	4
Len Lunde	C	6	1	2	3	0
Jack McIntyre	D	6	1	1	2	0
Marcel Pronovost	D	6	1	1	2	2
Jim Morrison	D	6	0	2	2	0
Warren Godfrey	D	6	1	0	1	10
Pete Goegan	D	6	1	0	1	13
Murray Oliver	C	6	1	0	1	4
Barry Cullen	RW	4	0	0	0	2
Lloyd Haddon	D	1	0	0	0	0
John McKenzie	RW	2	0	0	0	0
Marc Reaume	D	2	0	0	0	0
Terry Sawchuk	G	6	0	0	0	0
Brian Smith	LW	5	0	0	0	0

Goaltending

Player	MIN	GP	W	L	GA	GAA	SO
Terry Sawchuk	405	6	2	4	20	2.96	0
Team:	405	6	2	4	20	2.96	0

Note: GP = Games played; G = Goals; A = Assists; Pts = Points; +/- = Plus-minus PIM = Penalty minutes; PPG = Power-play goals; SHG = Short-handed goals; GWG = Game-winning goals;
MIN = Minutes played; W = Wins; L = Losses; T = Ties; GA = Goals against; GAA = Goals-against average; SO = Shutouts;

== Awards and records ==
- Gordie Howe, Hart Memorial Trophy
- Gordie Howe, Right Wing, NHL First All-Star Team
- Marcel Pronovost, Defense, NHL First All-Star Team
