= 1959–60 New York Rangers season =

NHL hockey team season

1959–60 New York Rangers
- League: 6th NHL
- 1959–60 record: 17–38–15
- Home record: 10–15–10
- Road record: 7–23–5
- Goals for: 187
- Goals against: 247

Team information
- General manager: Muzz Patrick
- Coach: Phil Watson; Muzz Patrick; Alf Pike
- Captain: George Sullivan
- Arena: Madison Square Garden

Team leaders
- Goals: Dean Prentice (32)
- Assists: Andy Bathgate (48)
- Points: Andy Bathgate (74)
- Penalty minutes: Lou Fontinato (137)
- Wins: Gump Worsley (7)
- Goals against average: Jack McCartan (1.75)

The 1959–60 New York Rangers season was the franchise's 34th season. In the regular season, the Rangers had a 17–38–15 record, and finished with 49 points. Their last-place finish caused them to miss the NHL playoffs for the second year in a row for the first time since the 1953–54 to 1954–55 seasons.

== Regular season ==
=== Final standings ===
National Hockey League
		GP	W	L	T	GF	GA	DIFF	Pts
1	Montreal Canadiens	70	40	18	12	255	178	+77	92
2	Toronto Maple Leafs	70	35	26	9	199	195	+4	79
3	Chicago Black Hawks	70	28	29	13	191	180	+11	69
4	Detroit Red Wings	70	26	29	15	186	197	−11	67
5	Boston Bruins	70	28	34	8	220	241	−21	64
6	New York Rangers	70	17	38	15	187	247	−60	49

=== Record vs. opponents ===
1959–60 NHL Records
Team	BOS	CHI	DET	MTL	NYR	TOR
Boston	—	5–6–3	5–8–1	4–8	8–4–2	6–6–2
Chicago	6–5–3	—	4–8–2	3–7–4	11–1–2	4–8–2
Detroit	8–5–1	8–4–2	—	2–7–5	4–6–4	4–9–1
Montreal	8–4	7–3–4	7–2–5	—	6–6–2	10–3–1
New York	4–8–2	1–11–2	6–4–4	6–6–2	—	2–9–3
Toronto	6–6–2	8–4–2	9–4–1	3–10–1	9–2–3	—

== Schedule and results ==
1959–60 regular season
October: 2–6–2 (home: 1–3–1; road: 1–3–1)

Game	October	Opponent	Score	Record
1	7	@ Chicago Black Hawks	5–2	0–1–0
2	10	@ Boston Bruins	6–4	0–2–0
3	11	@ Detroit Red Wings	4–2	0–3–0
4	14	Boston Bruins	4–3	0–4–0
5	17	@ Montreal Canadiens	4–2	1–4–0
6	18	Montreal Canadiens	6–5	1–5–0
7	21	Toronto Maple Leafs	3–2	1–6–0
8	24	@ Toronto Maple Leafs	1–1	1–6–1
9	25	Chicago Black Hawks	3–1	2–6–1
10	28	Detroit Red Wings	3–3	2–6–2

November: 1–8–4 (home: 1–3–3; road: 0–5–1)

Game	November	Opponent	Score	Record
11	1	Montreal Canadiens	3–1	2–7–2
12	4	@ Toronto Maple Leafs	4–1	2–8–2
13	5	@ Montreal Canadiens	8–2	2–9–2
14	8	@ Detroit Red Wings	3–3	2–9–3
15	11	Boston Bruins	6–3	3–9–3
16	14	Detroit Red Wings	4–0	3–10–3
17	15	Toronto Maple Leafs	2–2	3–10–4
18	18	@ Chicago Black Hawks	5–3	3–11–4
19	22	Detroit Red Wings	5–3	3–12–4
20	25	Boston Bruins	3–3	3–12–5
21	26	@ Boston Bruins	4–3	3–13–5
22	28	@ Chicago Black Hawks	6–2	3–14–5
23	29	Chicago Black Hawks	2–2	3–14–6

December: 6–6–0 (home: 3–3–0; road: 3–3–0)

Game	December	Opponent	Score	Record
24	3	@ Montreal Canadiens	7–4	4–14–6
25	5	@ Toronto Maple Leafs	6–3	4–15–6
26	6	Toronto Maple Leafs	6–0	5–15–6
27	12	@ Boston Bruins	4–3	6–15–6
28	13	Boston Bruins	4–3	7–15–6
29	19	@ Montreal Canadiens	5–3	7–16–6
30	20	Montreal Canadiens	6–5	8–16–6
31	23	Chicago Black Hawks	3–0	8–17–6
32	25	@ Detroit Red Wings	5–2	9–17–6
33	26	@ Toronto Maple Leafs	4–0	9–18–6
34	27	Toronto Maple Leafs	6–3	9–19–6
35	29	Boston Bruins	4–3	9–20–6

January: 2–8–4 (home: 1–1–3; road: 1–7–1)

Game	January	Opponent	Score	Record
36	1	@ Boston Bruins	7–3	9–21–6
37	3	Montreal Canadiens	8–3	10–21–6
38	6	Chicago Black Hawks	2–1	10–22–6
39	9	Detroit Red Wings	3–3	10–22–7
40	10	@ Detroit Red Wings	4–3	11–22–7
41	14	@ Boston Bruins	6–0	11–23–7
42	16	@ Toronto Maple Leafs	3–1	11–24–7
43	17	@ Chicago Black Hawks	3–1	11–25–7
44	21	@ Montreal Canadiens	11–2	11–26–7
45	23	@ Chicago Black Hawks	2–1	11–27–7
46	24	@ Detroit Red Wings	2–2	11–27–8
47	27	Montreal Canadiens	2–2	11–27–9
48	30	@ Toronto Maple Leafs	3–2	11–28–9
49	31	Detroit Red Wings	3–3	11–28–10

February: 3–7–2 (home: 2–4–1; road: 1–3–1)

Game	February	Opponent	Score	Record
50	3	Toronto Maple Leafs	4–2	11–29–10
51	4	@ Detroit Red Wings	3–1	12–29–10
52	6	Chicago Black Hawks	5–1	12–30–10
53	7	Montreal Canadiens	4–1	13–30–10
54	10	@ Chicago Black Hawks	5–1	13–31–10
55	14	@ Boston Bruins	3–0	13–32–10
56	17	Chicago Black Hawks	5–1	13–33–10
57	20	@ Montreal Canadiens	3–3	13–33–11
58	21	Boston Bruins	7–2	14–33–11
59	24	Detroit Red Wings	2–2	14–33–12
60	27	@ Montreal Canadiens	3–2	14–34–12
61	28	Toronto Maple Leafs	5–3	14–35–12

March: 3–3–3 (home: 2–1–2; road: 1–2–1)

Game	March	Opponent	Score	Record
62	5	@ Chicago Black Hawks	5–0	14–36–12
63	6	Detroit Red Wings	3–1	15–36–12
64	9	Chicago Black Hawks	1–1	15–36–13
65	10	@ Boston Bruins	3–3	15–36–14
66	12	@ Toronto Maple Leafs	4–1	16–36–14
67	13	Toronto Maple Leafs	2–2	16–36–15
68	16	Boston Bruins	3–2	16–37–15
69	19	@ Detroit Red Wings	6–3	16–38–15
70	20	Montreal Canadiens	3–1	17–38–15

Legend: Win (2 points) Loss (0 points) Tie (1 point)

== Player statistics ==
Skaters

Regular season
Player	GP	G	A	Pts	PIM
Andy Bathgate	70	26	48	74	28
Dean Prentice	70	32	34	66	43
Andy Hebenton	70	19	27	46	4
George Sullivan	70	12	25	37	81
Larry Popein	66	14	22	36	16
Bill Gadsby	65	9	22	31	60
Ken Schinkel	69	13	16	29	27
Brian Cullen	64	8	21	29	6
Camille Henry	49	12	15	27	6
Eddie Shack	62	8	10	18	110
Robert Kabel	44	5	11	16	32
Harry Howell	67	7	6	13	58
Lou Fontinato	64	2	11	13	137
Jim Bartlett	44	8	4	12	48
John Hanna	61	4	8	12	87
Art Stratton	18	2	5	7	2
Jack Bownass	37	2	5	7	34
Mel Pearson	23	1	5	6	13
Earl Ingarfield	20	1	2	3	2
Irv Spencer	32	1	2	3	20
Bill Sweeney	4	1	0	1	0
Ian Cushenan	17	0	1	1	22
Dave Balon	3	0	0	0	0
Parker MacDonald	3	0	0	0	0
Noel Price	6	0	0	0	2

Goaltenders

Regular season
Player	GP	TOI	W	L	T	GA	GAA	SA	SV%	SO
Lorne Worsley	39	2301	7	23	8	135	3.52	1260	.893	0
Marcel Paille	17	1020	6	9	2	67	3.94	515	.870	1
Al Rollins	10	600	3	4	3	31	3.10	386	.920	0
Jack McCartan	4	240	1	1	2	7	1.75	128	.945	0
Joe Schaefer	1	39	0	1	0	5	7.69	22	.773	0

^{†}Denotes player spent time with another team before joining Rangers. Stats reflect time with Rangers only.
^{‡}Traded mid-season. Stats reflect time with Rangers only.

Note:

Pos = Position;GP = Games played; G = Goals; A = Assists; Pts = Points; PIM = Penalty minutes; +/- = Plus/minus; PPG = Power-play goals; SHG = Short-handed goals; GWG = Game-winning goals
Pos = Position;GP = Games played; Min, TOI = Minutes played; W = Wins; L = Losses; T,T/OT = Ties; OTL = Overtime losses; GA = Goals-against; GAA = Goals-against average; SO = Shutouts; SA = Shots against; SV = Shots saved;SV% = Save percentage;

== Awards and records ==
- Dean Prentice, left wing, NHL second All-Star team

== See also ==
- 1959–60 NHL season
