= 1959–60 Montreal Canadiens season =

NHL hockey team season (won Stanley Cup)

1959–60 Montreal Canadiens
- Stanley Cup champions
- Prince of Wales Trophy winners
- League: 1st NHL
- 1959–60 record: 40–18–12
- Home record: 23–4–8
- Road record: 17–14–4
- Goals for: 255
- Goals against: 178

Team information
- General manager: Frank J. Selke
- Coach: Toe Blake
- Captain: Maurice Richard
- Alternate captains: Bernie Geoffrion; Doug Harvey; Tom Johnson
- Arena: Montreal Forum

Team leaders
- Goals: Jean Beliveau (34)
- Assists: Henri Richard (43)
- Points: Jean Beliveau (74)
- Penalty minutes: Henri Richard (66)
- Wins: Jacques Plante (40)
- Goals against average: Jacques Plante (2.54)

The 1959–60 Montreal Canadiens season was the club's 51st season of play. The team had another outstanding season, placing first in the league and winning the Stanley Cup for the fifth consecutive season, and the 12th time in team history. They won all eight postseason games to complete a perfect run, which as of 2026 is the last time this has happened in league history.

== Regular season ==
On November 1, 1959, at 3:06 of the first period, Jacques Plante was hit in the face by a shot fired by Andy Bathgate. Plante came back in the game wearing a mask (the second goaltender in NHL history to wear a mask after Clint Benedict) starting a trend where all NHL goaltenders today wear a mask.

=== Jacques Plante ===
The use of the goalie mask was Plante's most enduring contribution to the game, however, occurred as a result of an incident on November 1, 1959. He was hit in the face by a shot from New York Rangers player Andy Bathgate, needing to go to the dressing room for stitches. When he returned, he was wearing the crude home-made goalie mask that he had been using in practices. His coach, Toe Blake, was livid, but he had no other goalie to call upon, and Plante refused to return to the goal unless he kept the mask. Blake agreed on the condition that Plante discard the mask when the cut healed. Only Camille Henry beat him in that game, which the Canadiens won 3–1. In the ensuing days Plante refused to discard the mask, and as the Canadiens continued to win, Blake became less obstinate. The unbeaten streak stretched to 18 games. Plante did not wear the mask, at Blake's request, against Detroit on March 8, 1960. The Canadiens lost 3–0, and the mask returned for good the next night. Plante subsequently designed his own mask and masks for other goalies. Although Plante was not the first NHL goalie known to wear a facemask (Montreal Maroons goaltender Clint Benedict had done so thirty years before), Plante introduced the mask as everyday equipment, which continues to this day.

=== Final standings ===
National Hockey League
		GP	W	L	T	GF	GA	DIFF	Pts
1	Montreal Canadiens	70	40	18	12	255	178	+77	92
2	Toronto Maple Leafs	70	35	26	9	199	195	+4	79
3	Chicago Black Hawks	70	28	29	13	191	180	+11	69
4	Detroit Red Wings	70	26	29	15	186	197	−11	67
5	Boston Bruins	70	28	34	8	220	241	−21	64
6	New York Rangers	70	17	38	15	187	247	−60	49

=== Record vs. opponents ===
1959–60 NHL Records
Team	BOS	CHI	DET	MTL	NYR	TOR
Boston	—	5–6–3	5–8–1	4–8	8–4–2	6–6–2
Chicago	6–5–3	—	4–8–2	3–7–4	11–1–2	4–8–2
Detroit	8–5–1	8–4–2	—	2–7–5	4–6–4	4–9–1
Montreal	8–4	7–3–4	7–2–5	—	6–6–2	10–3–1
New York	4–8–2	1–11–2	6–4–4	6–6–2	—	2–9–3
Toronto	6–6–2	8–4–2	9–4–1	3–10–1	9–2–3	—

== Schedule and results ==
1959–60 regular season
October

Game	Result	Date	Score	Opponent	Record
1	W	October 8, 1959	4–1	Boston Bruins (1959–60)	1–0–0
2	T	October 10, 1959	1–1	Detroit Red Wings (1959–60)	1–0–1
3	L	October 11, 1959	4–8	@ Boston Bruins (1959–60)	1–1–1
4	W	October 15, 1959	4–2	Toronto Maple Leafs (1959–60)	2–1–1
5	L	October 17, 1959	2–4	New York Rangers (1959–60)	2–2–1
6	W	October 18, 1959	6–5	@ New York Rangers (1959–60)	3–2–1
7	W	October 22, 1959	4–1	Chicago Black Hawks (1959–60)	4–2–1
8	W	October 24, 1959	5–1	Boston Bruins (1959–60)	5–2–1
9	W	October 25, 1959	2–1	@ Detroit Red Wings (1959–60)	6–2–1
10	W	October 27, 1959	2–1	@ Chicago Black Hawks (1959–60)	7–2–1
11	T	October 28, 1959	1–1	@ Toronto Maple Leafs (1959–60)	7–2–2
12	T	October 31, 1959	2–2	Detroit Red Wings (1959–60)	7–2–3

November

Game	Result	Date	Score	Opponent	Record
13	W	November 1, 1959	3–1	@ New York Rangers (1959–60)	8–2–3
14	W	November 5, 1959	8–2	New York Rangers (1959–60)	9–2–3
15	T	November 7, 1959	2–2	Chicago Black Hawks (1959–60)	9–2–4
16	W	November 12, 1959	3–0	Toronto Maple Leafs (1959–60)	10–2–4
17	W	November 14, 1959	8–1	Boston Bruins (1959–60)	11–2–4
18	W	November 15, 1959	4–1	@ Boston Bruins (1959–60)	12–2–4
19	W	November 21, 1959	4–1	@ Toronto Maple Leafs (1959–60)	13–2–4
20	W	November 22, 1959	3–1	@ Chicago Black Hawks (1959–60)	14–2–4
21	W	November 26, 1959	4–2	@ Detroit Red Wings (1959–60)	15–2–4
22	W	November 28, 1959	1–0	Detroit Red Wings (1959–60)	16–2–4
23	W	November 29, 1959	4–2	@ Boston Bruins (1959–60)	17–2–4

December

Game	Result	Date	Score	Opponent	Record
24	L	December 2, 1959	0–1	@ Toronto Maple Leafs (1959–60)	17–3–4
25	L	December 3, 1959	4–7	New York Rangers (1959–60)	17–4–4
26	T	December 5, 1959	2–2	Chicago Black Hawks (1959–60)	17–4–5
27	T	December 6, 1959	4–4	@ Detroit Red Wings (1959–60)	17–4–6
28	L	December 12, 1959	2–3	Detroit Red Wings (1959–60)	17–5–6
29	T	December 13, 1959	4–4	@ Chicago Black Hawks (1959–60)	17–5–7
30	W	December 17, 1959	8–2	Toronto Maple Leafs (1959–60)	18–5–7
31	W	December 19, 1959	5–3	New York Rangers (1959–60)	19–5–7
32	L	December 20, 1959	5–6	@ New York Rangers (1959–60)	19–6–7
33	W	December 26, 1959	9–2	Chicago Black Hawks (1959–60)	20–6–7
34	W	December 27, 1959	3–1	@ Detroit Red Wings (1959–60)	21–6–7
35	W	December 30, 1959	3–2	@ Toronto Maple Leafs (1959–60)	22–6–7

January

Game	Result	Date	Score	Opponent	Record
36	W	January 2, 1960	6–5	Boston Bruins (1959–60)	23–6–7
37	L	January 3, 1960	3–8	@ New York Rangers (1959–60)	23–7–7
38	W	January 9, 1960	2–1	Chicago Black Hawks (1959–60)	24–7–7
39	L	January 10, 1960	0–3	@ Chicago Black Hawks (1959–60)	24–8–7
40	W	January 14, 1960	3–1	Toronto Maple Leafs (1959–60)	25–8–7
41	W	January 16, 1960	8–2	Boston Bruins (1959–60)	26–8–7
42	W	January 17, 1960	3–1	@ Boston Bruins (1959–60)	27–8–7
43	W	January 21, 1960	11–2	New York Rangers (1959–60)	28–8–7
44	W	January 23, 1960	4–2	Detroit Red Wings (1959–60)	29–8–7
45	W	January 24, 1960	3–2	@ Chicago Black Hawks (1959–60)	30–8–7
46	T	January 27, 1960	2–2	@ New York Rangers (1959–60)	30–8–8
47	W	January 28, 1960	4–2	@ Detroit Red Wings (1959–60)	31–8–8
48	T	January 30, 1960	2–2	Chicago Black Hawks (1959–60)	31–8–9
49	L	January 31, 1960	5–6	@ Boston Bruins (1959–60)	31–9–9

February

Game	Result	Date	Score	Opponent	Record
50	W	February 4, 1960	4–2	Toronto Maple Leafs (1959–60)	32–9–9
51	W	February 6, 1960	5–3	Boston Bruins (1959–60)	33–9–9
52	L	February 7, 1960	1–4	@ New York Rangers (1959–60)	33–10–9
53	W	February 10, 1960	4–2	@ Toronto Maple Leafs (1959–60)	34–10–9
54	L	February 13, 1960	6–7	@ Boston Bruins (1959–60)	34–11–9
55	L	February 14, 1960	0–2	@ Chicago Black Hawks (1959–60)	34–12–9
56	T	February 18, 1960	3–3	Detroit Red Wings (1959–60)	34–12–10
57	T	February 20, 1960	3–3	New York Rangers (1959–60)	34–12–11
58	W	February 21, 1960	6–3	@ Detroit Red Wings (1959–60)	35–12–11
59	L	February 24, 1960	1–3	@ Toronto Maple Leafs (1959–60)	35–13–11
60	W	February 27, 1960	3–2	New York Rangers (1959–60)	36–13–11

March

Game	Result	Date	Score	Opponent	Record
61	W	March 3, 1960	5–1	Toronto Maple Leafs (1959–60)	37–13–11
62	T	March 5, 1960	2–2	Detroit Red Wings (1959–60)	37–13–12
63	L	March 6, 1960	2–4	@ Chicago Black Hawks (1959–60)	37–14–12
64	L	March 8, 1960	0–3	@ Detroit Red Wings (1959–60)	37–15–12
65	W	March 9, 1960	9–4	@ Toronto Maple Leafs (1959–60)	38–15–12
66	W	March 12, 1960	5–0	Chicago Black Hawks (1959–60)	39–15–12
67	L	March 13, 1960	2–3	@ Boston Bruins (1959–60)	39–16–12
68	L	March 17, 1960	2–6	Toronto Maple Leafs (1959–60)	39–17–12
69	W	March 19, 1960	5–1	Boston Bruins (1959–60)	40–17–12
70	L	March 20, 1960	1–3	@ New York Rangers (1959–60)	40–18–12

Legend: Win (2 points) Loss (0 points) Tie (1 point)

== Playoffs ==
The Canadiens placed first in the standings and met the Chicago Black Hawks in the first round of the playoffs. The Canadiens swept the Hawks 4–0 to move on to the finals against Toronto.

=== Stanley Cup finals ===
Montreal swept the Maple Leafs, outscoring them 15–5, en route to being the first team since the 1952 Detroit Red Wings to go without a loss in the playoffs.

After the series Rocket Richard retired. He went out with style, finishing with his 34th finals goal in game three.

Toronto Maple Leafs vs. Montreal Canadiens

Date	Away	Score	Home	Score	Notes
April 7	Toronto Maple Leafs	2	Montreal Canadiens	4	
April 9	Toronto Maple Leafs	1	Montreal Canadiens	2	
April 12	Montreal Canadiens	5	Toronto Maple Leafs	2	
April 14	Montreal Canadiens	4	Toronto Maple Leafs	0	

Montreal won the best-of-seven series 4 games to 0.

== Player statistics ==
=== Regular season ===
==== Scoring ====
Player	Pos	GP	G	A	Pts	PIM
Jean Beliveau	C	60	34	40	74	57
Henri Richard	C	70	30	43	73	66
Bernie Geoffrion	RW	59	30	41	71	36
Dickie Moore	LW	62	22	42	64	54
Marcel Bonin	W	59	17	34	51	59
Claude Provost	RW	70	17	29	46	42
Phil Goyette	C	65	21	22	43	4
Donnie Marshall	LW	70	16	22	38	4
Maurice Richard	RW	51	19	16	35	50
Andre Pronovost	LW	69	12	19	31	61
Tom Johnson	D	64	4	25	29	59
Ralph Backstrom	C	64	13	15	28	24
Doug Harvey	D	66	6	21	27	45
Ab McDonald	LW	68	9	13	22	26
Albert Langlois	D	67	1	14	15	48
Jean-Guy Talbot	D	69	1	14	15	60
Bill Hicke	RW	43	3	10	13	17
Bob Turner	D	54	0	9	9	40
J.C. Tremblay	D	11	0	1	1	0
Reggie Fleming	D/LW	3	0	0	0	2
Charlie Hodge	G	1	0	0	0	0
Cec Hoekstra	C	4	0	0	0	0
Jacques Plante	G	69	0	0	0	2

==== Goaltending ====
Player	MIN	GP	W	L	T	GA	GAA	SO
Jacques Plante	4140	69	40	17	12	175	2.54	3
Charlie Hodge	60	1	0	1	0	3	3.00	0
Team:	4200	70	40	18	12	178	2.54	3

=== Playoffs ===
==== Scoring ====
Player	Pos	GP	G	A	Pts	PIM
Henri Richard	C	8	3	9	12	9
Bernie Geoffrion	RW	8	2	10	12	4
Dickie Moore	LW	8	6	4	10	4
Jean Beliveau	C	8	5	2	7	6
Marcel Bonin	W	8	1	4	5	12
Donnie Marshall	LW	8	2	2	4	0
Maurice Richard	RW	8	1	3	4	2
Doug Harvey	D	8	3	0	3	6
Phil Goyette	C	8	2	1	3	4
Bill Hicke	RW	7	1	2	3	0
Andre Pronovost	LW	8	1	2	3	0
Ralph Backstrom	C	7	0	3	3	2
Albert Langlois	D	8	0	3	3	18
Claude Provost	RW	8	1	1	2	0
Jean-Guy Talbot	D	8	1	1	2	8
Tom Johnson	D	8	0	1	1	4
Jacques Plante	G	8	0	0	0	0
Bob Turner	D	8	0	0	0	0

==== Goaltending ====
Player	MIN	GP	W	L	GA	GAA	SO
Jacques Plante	489	8	8	0	11	1.35	3
Team:	489	8	8	0	11	1.35	3

Note:

Pos = Position;GP = Games played; G = Goals; A = Assists; Pts = Points; PIM = Penalty minutes; +/- = Plus/minus; PPG = Power-play goals; SHG = Short-handed goals; GWG = Game-winning goals
Pos = Position;GP = Games played; Min, TOI = Minutes played; W = Wins; L = Losses; T,T/OT = Ties; OTL = Overtime losses; GA = Goals-against; GAA = Goals-against average; SO = Shutouts; SA = Shots against; SV = Shots saved;SV% = Save percentage;

== See also ==
- 1959–60 NHL season
- List of Stanley Cup champions
