= 1959–60 Boston Bruins season =

NHL team season

1959–60 Boston Bruins
- League: 5th NHL
- 1959–60 record: 28–34–8
- Home record: 21–11–3
- Road record: 7–23–5
- Goals for: 220
- Goals against: 241

Team information
- General manager: Lynn Patrick
- Coach: Milt Schmidt
- Captain: Fernie Flaman
- Alternate captains: None
- Arena: Boston Garden

Team leaders
- Goals: Bronco Horvath (39)
- Assists: Don McKenney (49)
- Points: Bronco Horvath (80)
- Penalty minutes: Vic Stasiuk (121)
- Wins: Harry Lumley (16)
- Goals against average: Don Simmons (3.25)

The 1959–60 Boston Bruins season saw the Bruins finish in fifth place in the National Hockey League (NHL) with a record of 28 wins, 34 losses, and 8 ties for 64 points the Bruins missed the playoffs for the first time since the 1955–56 season.

== Regular season ==
Boston's fifth-place finish caused them to miss the Stanley Cup playoffs for the first time since the 1955–56 season.

=== Final standings ===
National Hockey League
		GP	W	L	T	GF	GA	DIFF	Pts
1	Montreal Canadiens	70	40	18	12	255	178	+77	92
2	Toronto Maple Leafs	70	35	26	9	199	195	+4	79
3	Chicago Black Hawks	70	28	29	13	191	180	+11	69
4	Detroit Red Wings	70	26	29	15	186	197	−11	67
5	Boston Bruins	70	28	34	8	220	241	−21	64
6	New York Rangers	70	17	38	15	187	247	−60	49

=== Record vs. opponents ===
1959–60 NHL Records
Team	BOS	CHI	DET	MTL	NYR	TOR
Boston	—	5–6–3	5–8–1	4–8	8–4–2	6–6–2
Chicago	6–5–3	—	4–8–2	3–7–4	11–1–2	4–8–2
Detroit	8–5–1	8–4–2	—	2–7–5	4–6–4	4–9–1
Montreal	8–4	7–3–4	7–2–5	—	6–6–2	10–3–1
New York	4–8–2	1–11–2	6–4–4	6–6–2	—	2–9–3
Toronto	6–6–2	8–4–2	9–4–1	3–10–1	9–2–3	—

== Schedule and results ==
1959–60 regular season
October

Game	Result	Date	Score	Opponent	Record
1	L	October 8, 1959	1–4	@ Montreal Canadiens (1959–60)	0–1–0
2	W	October 10, 1959	6–4	New York Rangers (1959–60)	1–1–0
3	W	October 11, 1959	8–4	Montreal Canadiens (1959–60)	2–1–0
4	W	October 14, 1959	4–3	@ New York Rangers (1959–60)	3–1–0
5	L	October 17, 1959	0–3	@ Toronto Maple Leafs (1959–60)	3–2–0
6	T	October 18, 1959	2–2	@ Chicago Black Hawks (1959–60)	3–2–1
7	L	October 22, 1959	1–4	@ Detroit Red Wings (1959–60)	3–3–1
8	L	October 24, 1959	1–5	@ Montreal Canadiens (1959–60)	3–4–1
9	W	October 29, 1959	2–1	Detroit Red Wings (1959–60)	4–4–1
10	L	October 31, 1959	3–4	@ Toronto Maple Leafs (1959–60)	4–5–1

November

Game	Result	Date	Score	Opponent	Record
11	W	November 1, 1959	6–3	Toronto Maple Leafs (1959–60)	5–5–1
12	W	November 3, 1959	6–3	@ Chicago Black Hawks (1959–60)	6–5–1
13	W	November 5, 1959	8–3	@ Detroit Red Wings (1959–60)	7–5–1
14	W	November 8, 1959	5–3	Chicago Black Hawks (1959–60)	8–5–1
15	L	November 11, 1959	3–6	@ New York Rangers (1959–60)	8–6–1
16	L	November 12, 1959	5–6	Detroit Red Wings (1959–60)	8–7–1
17	L	November 14, 1959	1–8	@ Montreal Canadiens (1959–60)	8–8–1
18	L	November 15, 1959	1–4	Montreal Canadiens (1959–60)	8–9–1
19	T	November 21, 1959	3–3	Detroit Red Wings (1959–60)	8–9–2
20	L	November 22, 1959	1–2	Toronto Maple Leafs (1959–60)	8–10–2
21	T	November 25, 1959	3–3	@ New York Rangers (1959–60)	8–10–3
22	W	November 26, 1959	4–3	New York Rangers (1959–60)	9–10–3
23	T	November 28, 1959	2–2	@ Toronto Maple Leafs (1959–60)	9–10–4
24	L	November 29, 1959	2–4	Montreal Canadiens (1959–60)	9–11–4

December

Game	Result	Date	Score	Opponent	Record
25	T	December 2, 1959	2–2	@ Chicago Black Hawks (1959–60)	9–11–5
26	L	December 5, 1959	3–4	@ Detroit Red Wings (1959–60)	9–12–5
27	L	December 6, 1959	3–6	Chicago Black Hawks (1959–60)	9–13–5
28	W	December 10, 1959	6–3	Toronto Maple Leafs (1959–60)	10–13–5
29	L	December 12, 1959	3–4	New York Rangers (1959–60)	10–14–5
30	L	December 13, 1959	3–4	@ New York Rangers (1959–60)	10–15–5
31	L	December 16, 1959	0–4	@ Chicago Black Hawks (1959–60)	10–16–5
32	L	December 20, 1959	2–4	Detroit Red Wings (1959–60)	10–17–5
33	W	December 25, 1959	5–1	Chicago Black Hawks (1959–60)	11–17–5
34	L	December 27, 1959	1–6	@ Chicago Black Hawks (1959–60)	11–18–5
35	W	December 29, 1959	4–3	@ New York Rangers (1959–60)	12–18–5

January

Game	Result	Date	Score	Opponent	Record
36	W	January 1, 1960	7–3	New York Rangers (1959–60)	13–18–5
37	L	January 2, 1960	5–6	@ Montreal Canadiens (1959–60)	13–19–5
38	L	January 3, 1960	3–4	@ Detroit Red Wings (1959–60)	13–20–5
39	W	January 7, 1960	5–1	Chicago Black Hawks (1959–60)	14–20–5
40	W	January 9, 1960	3–2	@ Toronto Maple Leafs (1959–60)	15–20–5
41	W	January 10, 1960	4–0	Toronto Maple Leafs (1959–60)	16–20–5
42	W	January 14, 1960	6–0	New York Rangers (1959–60)	17–20–5
43	L	January 16, 1960	2–8	@ Montreal Canadiens (1959–60)	17–21–5
44	L	January 17, 1960	1–3	Montreal Canadiens (1959–60)	17–22–5
45	L	January 20, 1960	1–3	@ Chicago Black Hawks (1959–60)	17–23–5
46	L	January 21, 1960	2–5	@ Detroit Red Wings (1959–60)	17–24–5
47	T	January 23, 1960	3–3	@ Toronto Maple Leafs (1959–60)	17–24–6
48	W	January 24, 1960	6–2	Toronto Maple Leafs (1959–60)	18–24–6
49	W	January 30, 1960	3–2	Detroit Red Wings (1959–60)	19–24–6
50	W	January 31, 1960	6–5	Montreal Canadiens (1959–60)	20–24–6

February

Game	Result	Date	Score	Opponent	Record
51	L	February 4, 1960	2–7	Chicago Black Hawks (1959–60)	20–25–6
52	L	February 6, 1960	3–5	@ Montreal Canadiens (1959–60)	20–26–6
53	W	February 7, 1960	3–0	Toronto Maple Leafs (1959–60)	21–26–6
54	W	February 11, 1960	3–2	Detroit Red Wings (1959–60)	22–26–6
55	W	February 13, 1960	7–6	Montreal Canadiens (1959–60)	23–26–6
56	W	February 14, 1960	3–0	New York Rangers (1959–60)	24–26–6
57	L	February 17, 1960	1–3	@ Toronto Maple Leafs (1959–60)	24–27–6
58	L	February 20, 1960	1–4	@ Detroit Red Wings (1959–60)	24–28–6
59	L	February 21, 1960	2–7	@ New York Rangers (1959–60)	24–29–6
60	W	February 27, 1960	3–1	@ Chicago Black Hawks (1959–60)	25–29–6

March

Game	Result	Date	Score	Opponent	Record
61	L	March 1, 1960	2–3	@ Detroit Red Wings (1959–60)	25–30–6
62	L	March 3, 1960	0–2	Chicago Black Hawks (1959–60)	25–31–6
63	L	March 5, 1960	2–5	@ Toronto Maple Leafs (1959–60)	25–32–6
64	L	March 6, 1960	1–3	Toronto Maple Leafs (1959–60)	25–33–6
65	T	March 10, 1960	3–3	New York Rangers (1959–60)	25–33–7
66	W	March 12, 1960	5–1	Detroit Red Wings (1959–60)	26–33–7
67	W	March 13, 1960	3–2	Montreal Canadiens (1959–60)	27–33–7
68	W	March 16, 1960	3–2	@ New York Rangers (1959–60)	28–33–7
69	L	March 19, 1960	1–5	@ Montreal Canadiens (1959–60)	28–34–7
70	T	March 20, 1960	5–5	Chicago Black Hawks (1959–60)	28–34–8

Legend: Win (2 points) Loss (0 points) Tie (1 point)

== Player statistics ==
=== Regular season ===
Scoring

Player	Pos	GP	G	A	Pts	PIM
Bronco Horvath	C	68	39	41	80	60
Don McKenney	C	70	20	49	69	28
Vic Stasiuk	LW	69	29	39	68	121
John Bucyk	LW	56	16	36	52	26
Doug Mohns	LW/D	65	20	25	45	62
Jerry Toppazzini	RW	69	12	33	45	26
Leo Labine	RW	63	16	28	44	58
Jean-Guy Gendron	LW	67	24	11	35	64
Charlie Burns	C	62	10	17	27	46
Leo Boivin	D	70	4	21	25	66
Fleming MacKell	C	47	7	15	22	19
Fern Flaman	D	60	2	18	20	112
Larry Leach	C	69	7	12	19	47
Bob Armstrong	D	69	5	14	19	96
Dick Meissner	RW	60	5	6	11	22
Aut Erickson	D	58	1	6	7	29
Lorne Davis	RW	10	1	1	2	10
Dallas Smith	D	5	1	1	2	0
Nick Mickoski	LW	18	1	0	1	2
Larry Hillman	D	2	0	1	1	2
Don Ward	D	31	0	1	1	16
Stan Baluik	C	7	0	0	0	2
Pierre Gagne	LW	2	0	0	0	0
Harry Lumley	G	42	0	0	0	12
Dale Rolfe	D	3	0	0	0	0
Don Simmons	G	28	0	0	0	4
Gord Turlick	LW/C	2	0	0	0	2

Goaltending

Player	MIN	GP	W	L	T	GA	GAA	SO
Harry Lumley	2520	42	16	21	5	146	3.48	2
Don Simmons	1680	28	12	13	3	91	3.25	2
Team:	4200	70	28	34	8	237	3.39	4

Note:

Pos = Position;GP = Games played; G = Goals; A = Assists; Pts = Points; PIM = Penalty minutes; +/- = Plus/minus; PPG = Power-play goals; SHG = Short-handed goals; GWG = Game-winning goals
Pos = Position;GP = Games played; Min, TOI = Minutes played; W = Wins; L = Losses; T,T/OT = Ties; OTL = Overtime losses; GA = Goals-against; GAA = Goals-against average; SO = Shutouts; SA = Shots against; SV = Shots saved;SV% = Save percentage;

== Awards and records ==
- Bronco Horvath, Center, NHL Second All-Star Team
- Don McKenney, Lady Byng Memorial Trophy

== Transactions ==
Claim Aut Erikson from Chicago, Charlie Burns from Detroit and Bruce Gamble from New York.
