= Kitchener Canucks =

Canadian junior ice hockey team (1951–1956

- City: Kitchener, Ontario
- League: Ontario Hockey Association
- Operated: 1951–1956
- Home arena: Kitchener Memorial Auditorium
- Parent club: Montreal Canadiens

Franchise history
- 1951–1954: Kitchener Greenshirts
- 1954–1956: Kitchener Canucks
- 1956–present: Peterborough Petes

The Kitchener Canucks , originally known as the Kitchener Greenshirts, were a Canadian junior ice hockey team in the Ontario Hockey Association, which played home games at the Kitchener Memorial Auditorium. Based in Kitchener, Ontario, as a farm team of the Montreal Canadiens, they played as the Greenshirts from 1951 to 1954, as the Canucks from 1954 to 1956, then relocated and became the Peterborough Petes.

== History ==
The Kitchener Sports Association sought the return of junior A hockey, and a farm team agreement with the Montreal Canadiens to receive higher-calibre players. As part of the Ontario Hockey Association (OHA) approval to play in the 1951–52 season, the Greenshirts and the Kitchener-Waterloo Dutchmen senior team agreed to equally share playing nights at the Kitchener Memorial Auditorium. The Greenshirts were the first junior A hockey team based in Kitchener in 15 seasons, and had a local rivalry with the Waterloo Hurricanes who were affiliated with the Boston Bruins. The Greenshirts won their first two games of the season, including a 4–1 victory versus the Hurricanes. Goaltender Bill Harrington won the Red Tilson Trophy as the OHA's most outstanding player during the 1951–52 season.

The Greenshirts changed names to the Kitchener Canucks as of the 1954–55 season, and named Jack Stewart as coach. Stan Baluik won the Eddie Powers Memorial Trophy in the 1955–56 season, as the OHA's top scorer with 31 goals, 73 assists, and 104 points. The Canucks operated until 1956, when they relocated due to poor fan support in Kitchener and a newly constructed arena became available in Peterborough, Ontario.

== Notable alumni ==
Canucks' alumnus Willie O'Ree became the first black player in the National Hockey League (NHL). Alumnus Bob White played for the Canucks in the 1954–55 OHA season, and won a silver medal representing Canada in ice hockey at the 1956 Winter Olympics.

List of alumni who played in the NHL or World Hockey Association:

- Stan Baluik
- Les Binkley
- Marc Boileau
- Gilles Boisvert
- Gary Collins
- Wayne Connelly
- Glen Cressman
- Kent Douglas
- Garry Edmundson
- Howie Glover
- Floyd Hillman
- Ted McCaskill
- Bob McCord
- Keke Mortson
- Willie O'Ree
- Claude Pronovost
- Irv Spencer
- Myron Stankiewicz
- Orval Tessier
- Tom Thurlby
- Howie Young

== Season-by-season results ==
Regular season and playoffs results:

- Kitchener Greenshirts (1951–1954)
- Kitchener Canucks (1954–1956)

Legend: GP = Games played, W = Wins, L = Losses, T = Ties, Pts = Points, GF = Goals for, GA = Goals against

Season	Regular season									Playoffs
Season	GP	W	L	T	Pts	Pct	GF	GA	Finish	Playoffs
1951–52	54	29	22	3	61	0.565	231	213	6th OHA	Lost quarterfinal (St. Catharines Teepees) 3–1
1952–53	56	15	38	5	35	0.313	161	239	9th OHA	Did not qualify
1953–54	60	28	27	5	61	0.508	236	211	5th OHA	Lost quarterfinal (Toronto Marlboros) 3–1
1954-55	49	8	39	2	18	0.184	140	248	8th OHA	Did not qualify
1955-56	48	26	21	1	53	0.552	222	198	2nd OHA	Lost quarterfinal (Barrie Flyers) 4–3–1
