= 1959–60 Toronto Maple Leafs season =

NHL hockey team season

1959–60 Toronto Maple Leafs
- League: 2nd NHL
- 1959–60 record: 35–26–9
- Home record: 20–9–6
- Road record: 15–17–3
- Goals for: 199
- Goals against: 195

Team information
- General manager: Punch Imlach
- Coach: Punch Imlach
- Captain: George Armstrong
- Arena: Maple Leaf Gardens

Team leaders
- Goals: Bob Pulford (24)
- Assists: Tim Horton (29)
- Points: Bob Pulford (52)
- Penalty minutes: Carl Brewer (150)
- Wins: Johnny Bower (34)
- Goals against average: Johnny Bower (2.68)

The 1959–60 Toronto Maple Leafs season saw the Maple Leafs finish in second place in the National Hockey League (NHL) with a record of 35 wins, 26 losses, and 9 ties for 79 points. They defeated the Detroit Red Wings in six games in the Semi-finals before being swept by their arch-rivals, the Montreal Canadiens, in the Stanley Cup Finals.

This was the last time a Toronto-based team lost in the championship round of any of the four major North American sports leagues until the 2025 World Series.

== Regular season ==
=== Final standings ===
National Hockey League
		GP	W	L	T	GF	GA	DIFF	Pts
1	Montreal Canadiens	70	40	18	12	255	178	+77	92
2	Toronto Maple Leafs	70	35	26	9	199	195	+4	79
3	Chicago Black Hawks	70	28	29	13	191	180	+11	69
4	Detroit Red Wings	70	26	29	15	186	197	−11	67
5	Boston Bruins	70	28	34	8	220	241	−21	64
6	New York Rangers	70	17	38	15	187	247	−60	49

=== Record vs. opponents ===
1959–60 NHL Records
Team	BOS	CHI	DET	MTL	NYR	TOR
Boston	—	5–6–3	5–8–1	4–8	8–4–2	6–6–2
Chicago	6–5–3	—	4–8–2	3–7–4	11–1–2	4–8–2
Detroit	8–5–1	8–4–2	—	2–7–5	4–6–4	4–9–1
Montreal	8–4	7–3–4	7–2–5	—	6–6–2	10–3–1
New York	4–8–2	1–11–2	6–4–4	6–6–2	—	2–9–3
Toronto	6–6–2	8–4–2	9–4–1	3–10–1	9–2–3	—

== Schedule and results ==
1959–60 regular season
October

Game	Result	Date	Score	Opponent	Record
1	W	October 10, 1959	6–3	Chicago Black Hawks (1959–60)	1–0–0
2	W	October 11, 1959	3–1	@ Chicago Black Hawks (1959–60)	2–0–0
3	L	October 15, 1959	2–4	@ Montreal Canadiens (1959–60)	2–1–0
4	W	October 17, 1959	3–0	Boston Bruins (1959–60)	3–1–0
5	L	October 18, 1959	0–3	@ Detroit Red Wings (1959–60)	3–2–0
6	W	October 21, 1959	3–2	@ New York Rangers (1959–60)	4–2–0
7	T	October 24, 1959	1–1	New York Rangers (1959–60)	4–2–1
8	T	October 28, 1959	1–1	Montreal Canadiens (1959–60)	4–2–2
9	W	October 31, 1959	4–3	Boston Bruins (1959–60)	5–2–2

November

Game	Result	Date	Score	Opponent	Record
10	L	November 1, 1959	3–6	@ Boston Bruins (1959–60)	5–3–2
11	W	November 4, 1959	4–1	New York Rangers (1959–60)	6–3–2
12	T	November 7, 1959	2–2	Detroit Red Wings (1959–60)	6–3–3
13	W	November 10, 1959	3–1	@ Chicago Black Hawks (1959–60)	7–3–3
14	L	November 12, 1959	0–3	@ Montreal Canadiens (1959–60)	7–4–3
15	T	November 14, 1959	3–3	Chicago Black Hawks (1959–60)	7–4–4
16	T	November 15, 1959	2–2	@ New York Rangers (1959–60)	7–4–5
17	W	November 18, 1959	3–2	Detroit Red Wings (1959–60)	8–4–5
18	L	November 21, 1959	1–4	Montreal Canadiens (1959–60)	8–5–5
19	W	November 22, 1959	2–1	@ Boston Bruins (1959–60)	9–5–5
20	W	November 26, 1959	4–3	@ Chicago Black Hawks (1959–60)	10–5–5
21	T	November 28, 1959	2–2	Boston Bruins (1959–60)	10–5–6
22	W	November 29, 1959	4–1	@ Detroit Red Wings (1959–60)	11–5–6

December

Game	Result	Date	Score	Opponent	Record
23	W	December 2, 1959	1–0	Montreal Canadiens (1959–60)	12–5–6
24	W	December 5, 1959	6–3	New York Rangers (1959–60)	13–5–6
25	L	December 6, 1959	0–6	@ New York Rangers (1959–60)	13–6–6
26	L	December 10, 1959	3–6	@ Boston Bruins (1959–60)	13–7–6
27	L	December 12, 1959	2–4	Chicago Black Hawks (1959–60)	13–8–6
28	L	December 13, 1959	2–4	@ Detroit Red Wings (1959–60)	13–9–6
29	L	December 17, 1959	2–8	@ Montreal Canadiens (1959–60)	13–10–6
30	W	December 19, 1959	4–2	Detroit Red Wings (1959–60)	14–10–6
31	L	December 20, 1959	4–7	@ Chicago Black Hawks (1959–60)	14–11–6
32	W	December 26, 1959	4–0	New York Rangers (1959–60)	15–11–6
33	W	December 27, 1959	6–3	@ New York Rangers (1959–60)	16–11–6
34	L	December 30, 1959	2–3	Montreal Canadiens (1959–60)	16–12–6
35	W	December 31, 1959	4–2	@ Detroit Red Wings (1959–60)	17–12–6

January

Game	Result	Date	Score	Opponent	Record
36	L	January 2, 1960	2–4	Chicago Black Hawks (1959–60)	17–13–6
37	W	January 3, 1960	4–0	@ Chicago Black Hawks (1959–60)	18–13–6
38	W	January 6, 1960	3–1	Detroit Red Wings (1959–60)	19–13–6
39	L	January 9, 1960	2–3	Boston Bruins (1959–60)	19–14–6
40	L	January 10, 1960	0–4	@ Boston Bruins (1959–60)	19–15–6
41	L	January 14, 1960	1–3	@ Montreal Canadiens (1959–60)	19–16–6
42	W	January 16, 1960	3–1	New York Rangers (1959–60)	20–16–6
43	L	January 17, 1960	3–4	@ Detroit Red Wings (1959–60)	20–17–6
44	T	January 23, 1960	3–3	Boston Bruins (1959–60)	20–17–7
45	L	January 24, 1960	2–6	@ Boston Bruins (1959–60)	20–18–7
46	W	January 27, 1960	2–1	Chicago Black Hawks (1959–60)	21–18–7
47	W	January 30, 1960	3–2	New York Rangers (1959–60)	22–18–7
48	T	January 31, 1960	3–3	@ Chicago Black Hawks (1959–60)	22–18–8

February

Game	Result	Date	Score	Opponent	Record
49	W	February 3, 1960	4–2	@ New York Rangers (1959–60)	23–18–8
50	L	February 4, 1960	2–4	@ Montreal Canadiens (1959–60)	23–19–8
51	W	February 6, 1960	6–4	Detroit Red Wings (1959–60)	24–19–8
52	L	February 7, 1960	0–3	@ Boston Bruins (1959–60)	24–20–8
53	L	February 10, 1960	2–4	Montreal Canadiens (1959–60)	24–21–8
54	W	February 13, 1960	7–1	Detroit Red Wings (1959–60)	25–21–8
55	W	February 14, 1960	3–1	@ Detroit Red Wings (1959–60)	26–21–8
56	W	February 17, 1960	3–1	Boston Bruins (1959–60)	27–21–8
57	W	February 20, 1960	3–1	Chicago Black Hawks (1959–60)	28–21–8
58	L	February 21, 1960	5–7	@ Chicago Black Hawks (1959–60)	28–22–8
59	W	February 24, 1960	3–1	Montreal Canadiens (1959–60)	29–22–8
60	L	February 27, 1960	3–4	Detroit Red Wings (1959–60)	29–23–8
61	W	February 28, 1960	5–3	@ New York Rangers (1959–60)	30–23–8

March

Game	Result	Date	Score	Opponent	Record
62	L	March 3, 1960	1–5	@ Montreal Canadiens (1959–60)	30–24–8
63	W	March 5, 1960	5–2	Boston Bruins (1959–60)	31–24–8
64	W	March 6, 1960	3–1	@ Boston Bruins (1959–60)	32–24–8
65	L	March 9, 1960	4–9	Montreal Canadiens (1959–60)	32–25–8
66	L	March 12, 1960	1–4	New York Rangers (1959–60)	32–26–8
67	T	March 13, 1960	2–2	@ New York Rangers (1959–60)	32–26–9
68	W	March 17, 1960	6–2	@ Montreal Canadiens (1959–60)	33–26–9
69	W	March 19, 1960	1–0	Chicago Black Hawks (1959–60)	34–26–9
70	W	March 20, 1960	3–2	@ Detroit Red Wings (1959–60)	35–26–9

Legend: Win (2 points) Loss (0 points) Tie (1 point)

== Playoffs ==
Montreal swept the Chicago Black Hawks in four games to reach the Final. In the other semi-final, Toronto defeated the Detroit Red Wings four games to two.

== Stanley Cup Finals ==
Montreal swept the Maple Leafs, outscoring them 15–5, en route to being the first team since the 1952 Detroit Red Wings to go without a loss in the playoffs.

After the series Rocket Richard retired. He went out with style, finishing with his 34th final-series goal in the third game.

Toronto Maple Leafs vs. Montreal Canadiens

Date	Away	Score	Home	Score	Notes
April 7	Toronto Maple Leafs	2	Montreal Canadiens	4	
April 9	Toronto Maple Leafs	1	Montreal Canadiens	2	
April 12	Montreal Canadiens	5	Toronto Maple Leafs	2	
April 14	Montreal Canadiens	4	Toronto Maple Leafs	0	

Montreal wins best-of-seven series 4 games to 0

== Player statistics ==
=== Forwards ===
Note: GP= Games played; G= Goals; AST= Assists; PTS = Points; PIM = Points

Player	GP	G	AST	PTS	PIM
Bob Pulford	70	24	28	52	81
George Armstrong	70	23	28	51	60
Dick Duff	67	19	22	41	51
Frank Mahovlich	70	18	21	39	61
Billy Harris	70	13	25	38	29
Bert Olmstead	53	15	21	36	63
Ron Stewart	67	14	20	34	28
Johnny Wilson	70	15	16	31	8
Gerry Ehman	69	12	16	28	26
Larry Regan	47	4	16	20	6
Gerry James	34	4	9	13	56
Ted Hampson	41	2	8	10	17
Garry Edmundson	39	4	6	10	47
Dave Creighton	14	1	5	6	4
Rudy Migay	1	0	0	0	0
Ken Girard	1	0	0	0	0
Pat Hannigan	1	0	0	0	0

=== Defencemen ===
Note: GP= Games played; G= Goals; AST= Assists; PTS = Points; PIM = Points

Player	GP	G	AST	PTS	PIM
Allan Stanley	64	10	23	33	22
Tim Horton	70	3	29	32	69
Carl Brewer	67	4	19	23	150
Bobby Baun	61	8	9	17	59
Red Kelly	18	6	5	11	8
Joe Crozier	5	0	3	3	2
Marc Reaume	36	0	1	1	6
Al MacNeil	4	0	0	0	2

=== Goaltending ===
Note: GP = Games played; W = Wins; L = Losses; T = Ties; SO = Shutouts; GAA = Goals against average

Player	GP	W	L	T	SO	GAA
Johnny Bower	66	34	24	8	5	2.68
Ed Chadwick	4	1	2	1	0	3.75

== Awards and records ==
- Allan Stanley, Defence, NHL Second All-Star Team
