= Henri Richard =

Canadian ice hockey player (1936–2020)

- Hockey Hall of Fame, 1979
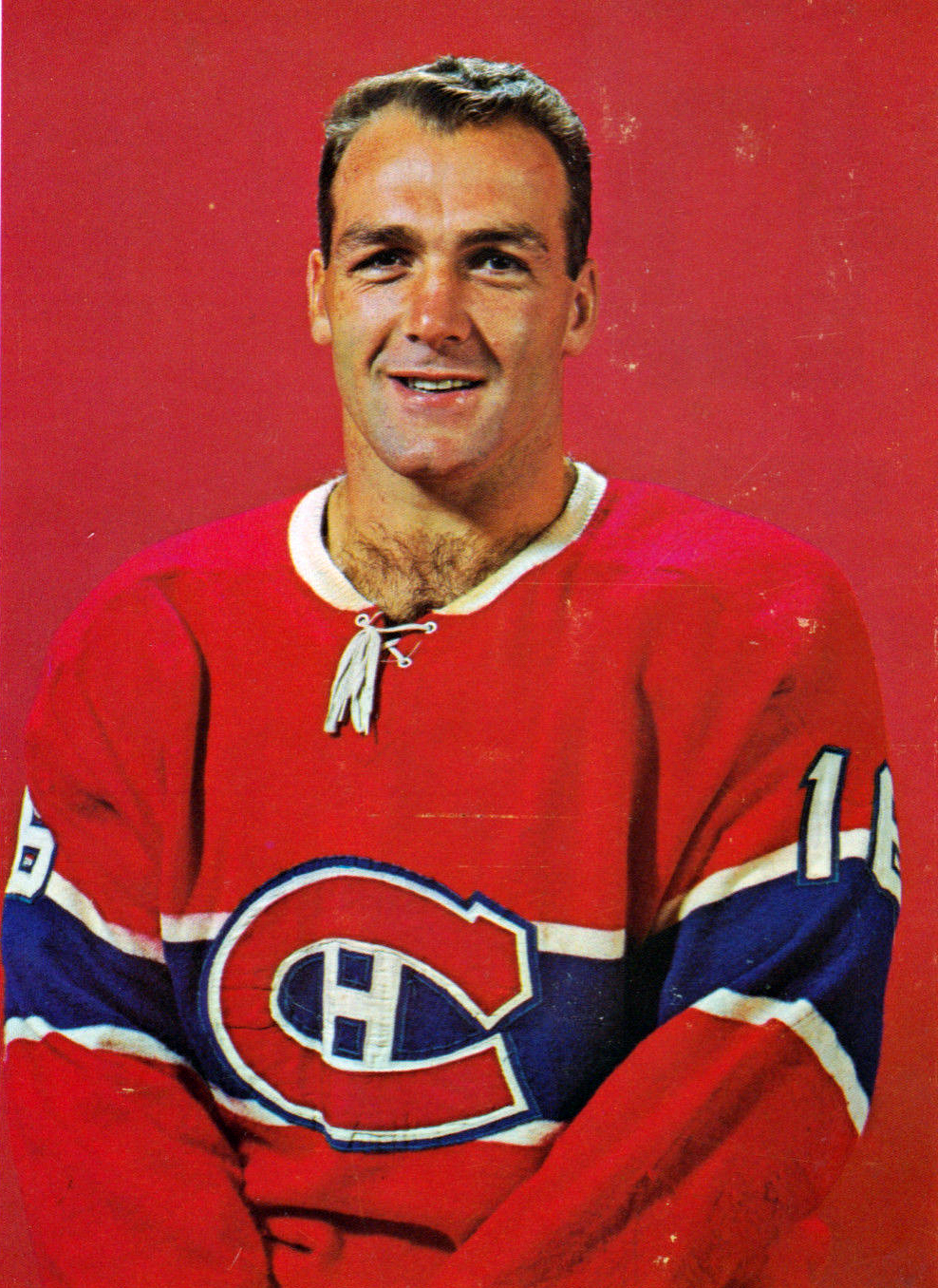
- Richard with the Montreal Canadiens, c. 1963
- Born: February 29, 1936 Montreal, Quebec, Canada
- Died: March 6, 2020 (aged 84) Laval, Quebec, Canada
- Height: 5 ft 7 in (170 cm)
- Weight: 160 lb (73 kg; 11 st 6 lb)
- Position: Centre
- Shot: Right
- Played for: Montreal Canadiens
- Playing career: 1955–1975

Joseph Henri Richard (February 29, 1936 – March 6, 2020) was a Canadian professional ice hockey player who played centre with the Montreal Canadiens in the National Hockey League (NHL) from 1955 to 1975. He was nicknamed "Pocket Rocket" after his older brother, Canadiens' legend and fellow Hockey Hall of Famer Maurice "Rocket" Richard. Henri played his entire professional career with the Canadiens and won the Stanley Cup 11 times as a player, the most in NHL history. Richard and Bill Russell of the National Basketball Association are tied for the record of the most championships won by an athlete in a North American sports league. In 2017, Richard was named one of the '100 Greatest NHL Players' in history.

== Early life ==
Henri Richard was born on February 29, 1936, in Montreal, the seventh of eight children of Alice (Laramée) and Onésime Richard. (Note: The other children were, in order: Maurice, Georgette, René, Rollande, Jacques, Marguerite, and Claude. See Richard & Normand 2020, p. 17.) His father worked as a machinist for the Canadian Pacific Railway, specifically at the Angus Yards. His older brother Maurice Richard played hockey for the Montreal Canadiens beginning in 1942, when Henri was six years old. Maurice Richard quickly became a superstar player for the Canadiens, earning the nickname Rocket Richard, and Henri Richard wished to emulate his brother and go into hockey. Henri joined the junior Montreal Canadiens as a 15 year old, and led the Quebec junior league in scoring for two consecutive seasons before being promoted to the NHL.

== Playing career ==
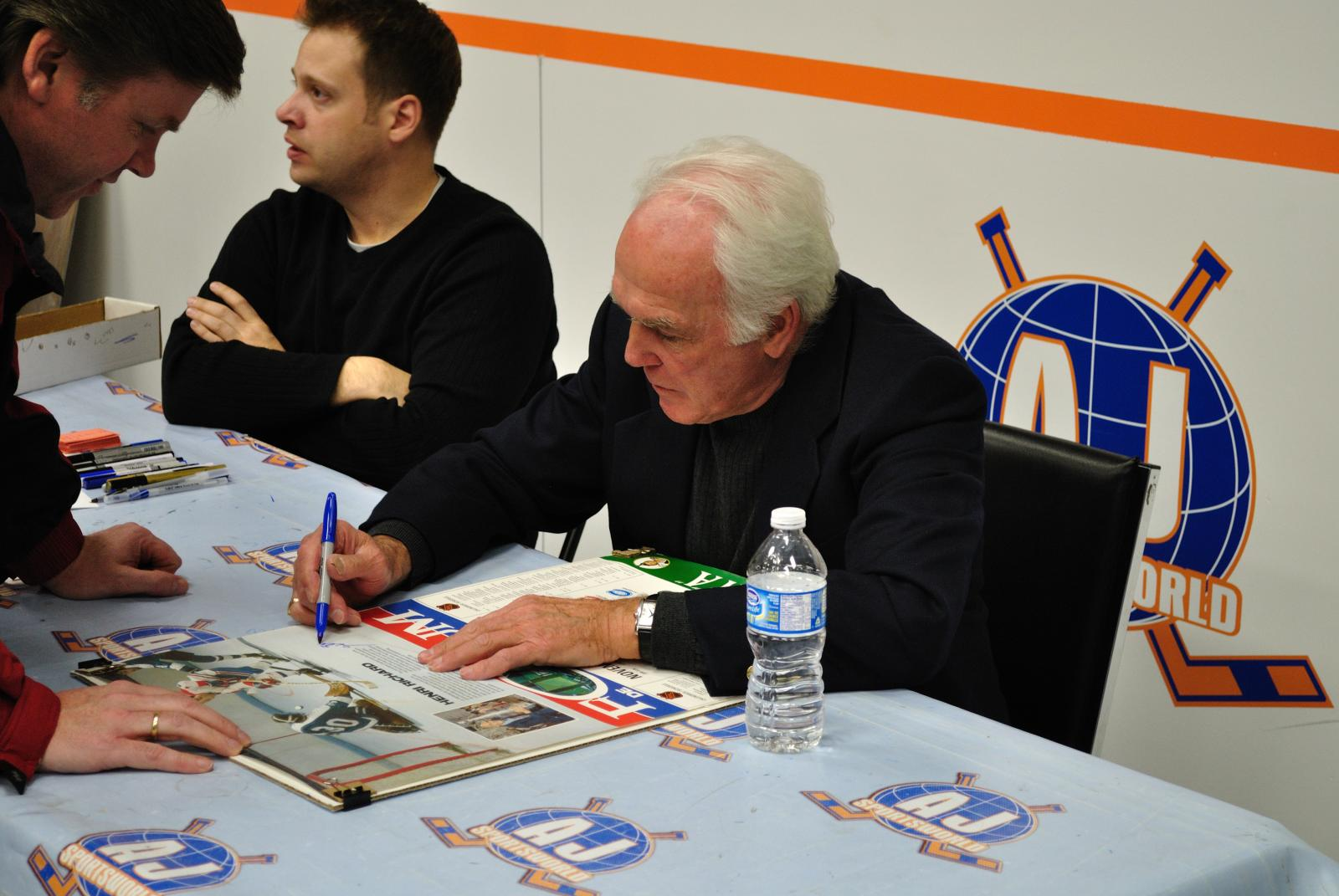
Henri Richard signing autographs in 2011

Henri Richard began his professional career playing on the same team as his older, more famous brother; and comparisons between himself and his brother were easy to make. He was nicknamed "Pocket Rocket" while still a junior in reference to his brother's nickname "Rocket Richard," as well as the fact that Henri Richard was shorter than his brother. The two Richard brothers' style of play was quite different. Maurice Richard was famous for driving at the net with brute force; however, Henri Richard preferred tactical playmaking and outthinking the opponent. Maurice shot left; Henri shot right. Maurice was a prodigious goal-scorer, the first to score 50 goals in 50 games, and led the league in goals on five occasions. Henri led the league in assists twice, in 1957–58 and in 1962–63. Maurice was strong; Henri was fast. However, they had one thing in common: both were willing to be physical on the ice.

Initially, Montreal Canadiens coach Toe Blake kept the two Richard brothers apart on the ice, fearing that his star Maurice Richard would give up goalscoring opportunities to his younger brother. However, one game against Chicago a couple of injuries forced Blake to play the Richard brothers together, and Henri assisted Maurice on a goal in the third period, and from then on he played the brothers together on a line with hall-of-famer Dickie Moore. Initially, Maurice would watch out for his brother, and go after anyone who pushed his younger brother around; but after Henri won a fight while Maurice was stuck in the penalty box, Maurice realized that his brother could take care of himself, and stopped looking out for him. Toe Blake later said that playing with Henri forced Maurice to become a better player, and helped prolong Maurice's career. Later in 1958, when Maurice Richard was injured, Toe Blake moved Marcel Bonin to the line to take Maurice's place, and Henri Richard's line continued to produce goals, showing the world that Maurice Richard was not simply carrying his little brother.

The Canadiens won the Stanley Cup in each of Henri Richard's first five seasons, the longest championship streak in NHL history. Maurice Richard retired after the last of these titles in 1960, however even before then Henri Richard was recognized as a star in his own right. In 1957–58, he was named to the first All-Star team and in 1959 he was named to the second All-Star team; he was also named to the second All-Star team in 1961 and 1963. He scored the Stanley Cup-clinching goal at the 2:20 mark of the first overtime of game six in the 1966 Stanley Cup Final against the Detroit Red Wings, when a pass bounced off of Henri Richard's body into the net while Detroit's goalie Roger Crozier was still sprawled out on the ice. In the 1971 Stanley Cup Final, Richard scored the game-tying and Stanley Cup-winning goals in Game Seven against the Chicago Black Hawks.

The 1971 Stanley Cup Final was a particularly controversial moment for Richard, as he was benched in game five by head coach Al MacNeil on May 13, 1971. After the game, in front of reporters in the Canadiens' dressing room, Richard went on to call MacNeil "the worst coach I have ever played for. ... He is incompetent." His comments resulted in MacNeil getting death threats and requiring police protection for him and his family during the rest of the series. Despite winning the Stanley Cup, MacNeil did not have much choice except to resign as the Canadiens coach on June 10, 1971, and was replaced by Scotty Bowman. MacNeil became the general manager and head coach of their top farm team, the American Hockey League's Nova Scotia Voyageurs. Another surprise, captain Jean Beliveau retired on June 9, 1971. With the captaincy now open, Richard was then elected as the team captain in mid-September 1971. By 1974, MacNeil and Richard reconciled.

== Retirement and legacy ==
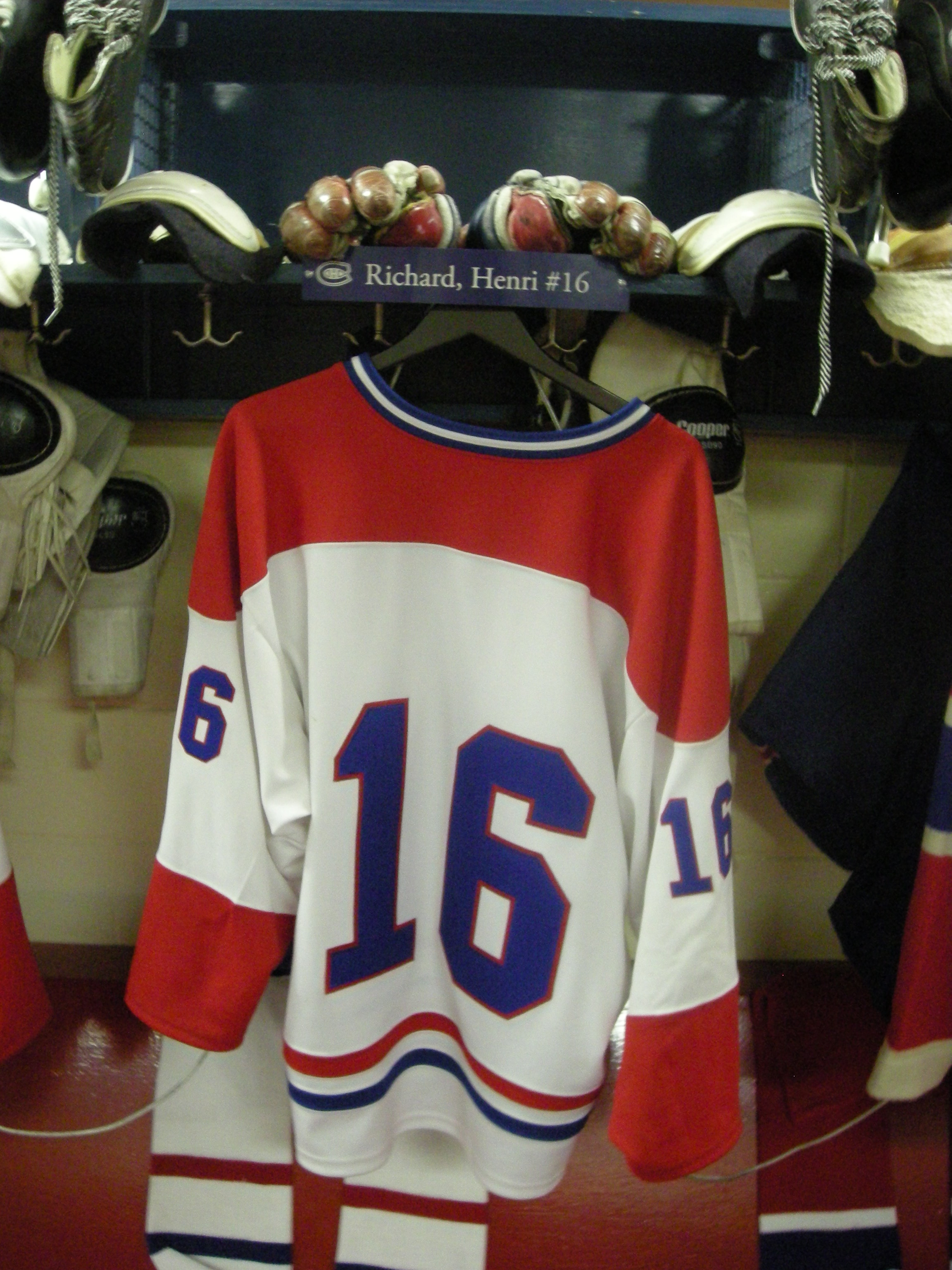

Not liking the spotlight, Richard reluctantly consented to a tribute night in his honour, hosted by the Canadiens organization, before a game at the Montreal Forum on January 26, 1974. However, he insisted that the over $111,000 in donations collected for the event, be contributed towards the construction of a gymnasium for St. Arsene Orphanage on rue Cristophe-Colomb. His brother, Maurice, made his first appearance at the Forum in almost a decade, after a feud with the Canadiens organization, and received a warm welcome from the fans. The whole 30-minute red carpet ceremony was broadcast live, coast to coast, on CBC-TV's Hockey Night in Canada program, as part of the Canadiens versus the Chicago Black Hawks game.

Henri Richard served as captain of the Canadiens from 1971 until his retirement on July 14, 1975. He was the ninth player to reach 1,000 career points, with 358 goals and 688 assists in 1,256 games. His 1,256 regular-season games played in a Canadiens uniform are a franchise record. Henri won the Stanley Cup 11 times as a player, the most in NHL history. Only one other athlete in North American professional sports has achieved winning eleven championships in his respective league—Bill Russell of the NBA's Boston Celtics. Henri also scored two Stanley Cup-winning goals, one of five players to have done so.

A few months after he announced his retirement, the Canadiens retired his jersey, number 16, at a pre-game ceremony on December 10, 1975. As well, the team also honoured the person that wore it before him, his former Junior A coach, Elmer Lach. He was elected to the Hockey Hall of Fame in 1979. In 1998, he was ranked number 29 on The Hockey News list of the 100 Greatest Hockey Players. He later served as an ambassador for the Canadiens' organization. In 2017, as part of the NHL's centennial celebrations, the league compiled a list of the 100 greatest players during the past century, with Richard on it.

== Private life and death ==
Richard met his wife, the former Lise Villiard, when they were only six-years-old. They were skating buddies and as he told The Gazette in a feature interview before his 1974 tribute night, "We'd be on the rink for an hour and a half or two hours and I'd never say anything. She'd do the talking, I'd do the listening." They were married for 63 years, until his death. They had five kids: Michèle, Gilles, Denis, Marie-France and Nathalie – as well as 10 grandchildren, and four great-grandchildren.

Since he was seven, he dreamed of owning a tavern. In the early 1960s he opened one, Henri Richard's, on Park Avenue. It became a brasserie –an upscale bar and restaurant compared to a tavern– in 1973. When he wanted to retire from running the business, he hoped to pass it on to one of his children, but none of them wanted to operate it, so he sold it in 1986.

In 2015, it was announced that Richard had been diagnosed with Alzheimer's disease. He died on March 6, 2020, at the age of 84 due to complications of the disease, in Laval, Quebec. Richard's son Denis revealed that he had been posthumously diagnosed with stage 3 chronic traumatic encephalopathy.

== Career statistics ==
			Regular season					Playoffs
Season	Team	League	GP	G	A	Pts	PIM	GP	G	A	Pts	PIM
1951–52	Montreal Nationale	QJHL	49	23	32	55	35	4	1	0	1	0
1952–53	Montreal Nationale	QJHL	46	27	36	63	55	7	4	5	9	4
1952–53	Montreal Royals	QSHL	1	0	0	0	0	—	—	—	—	—
1953–54	Montreal Jr. Canadiens	QJHL	54	56	53	109	85	7	6	7	13	6
1954–55	Montreal Jr. Canadiens	QJHL	44	33	33	66	65	4	3	1	4	2
1955–56	Montreal Canadiens	NHL	64	19	21	40	46	10	4	4	8	21
1956–57	Montreal Canadiens	NHL	63	18	36	54	71	10	2	6	8	10
1957–58	Montreal Canadiens	NHL	67	28	52	80	56	10	1	7	8	11
1958–59	Montreal Canadiens	NHL	63	21	30	51	33	11	3	8	11	13
1959–60	Montreal Canadiens	NHL	70	30	43	73	66	8	3	9	12	9
1960–61	Montreal Canadiens	NHL	70	24	44	68	91	6	2	4	6	22
1961–62	Montreal Canadiens	NHL	54	21	29	50	48	—	—	—	—	—
1962–63	Montreal Canadiens	NHL	67	23	50	73	57	5	1	1	2	2
1963–64	Montreal Canadiens	NHL	66	14	39	53	73	7	1	1	2	9
1964–65	Montreal Canadiens	NHL	53	23	29	52	43	13	7	4	11	24
1965–66	Montreal Canadiens	NHL	62	22	39	61	47	8	1	4	5	2
1966–67	Montreal Canadiens	NHL	65	21	34	55	28	10	4	6	10	2
1967–68	Montreal Canadiens	NHL	54	9	19	28	16	13	4	4	8	4
1968–69	Montreal Canadiens	NHL	64	15	37	52	45	14	2	4	6	8
1969–70	Montreal Canadiens	NHL	62	16	36	52	61	—	—	—	—	—
1970–71	Montreal Canadiens	NHL	75	12	37	49	46	20	5	7	12	20
1971–72	Montreal Canadiens	NHL	75	12	32	44	48	6	0	3	3	4
1972–73	Montreal Canadiens	NHL	71	8	35	43	21	17	6	4	10	14
1973–74	Montreal Canadiens	NHL	75	19	36	55	28	6	2	2	4	2
1974–75	Montreal Canadiens	NHL	16	3	10	13	4	6	1	2	3	4
NHL totals			1,256	358	688	1,046	928	180	49	80	129	181

Career statistics taken from NHL.com.

== Achievements ==
NHL
Award	Year(s)
All-Star Game	1956, 1957, 1958, 1959, 1960, 1961, 1963, 1967, 1974
Bill Masterton Memorial Trophy	1974
First All-Star team	1958
Second All-Star team	1959, 1961, 1963
Stanley Cup champion	1956, 1957, 1958, 1959, 1960, 1965, 1966, 1968, 1969, 1971, 1973

Awards taken from EliteProspects.com.

== See also ==
- List of Stanley Cup champions
- Notable families in the NHL
- List of NHL players with 1,000 points
- List of NHL players with 1,000 games played

== Notes ==
=== References ===
- Richard, Denis; Normand, Léandre (2020), Henri Richard: La Légende aux 11 Coupes Stanley [Henri Richard: The Legend of 11 Stanley Cups] (in French), Montreal: Les Éditions de l'Homm, ISBN 978-2-7619-5531-7

Preceded by Jean Béliveau	Montreal Canadiens captain 1971–1975	Succeeded by Yvan Cournoyer
