= Lloyd Haddon =

Canadian ice hockey player

- Born: August 10, 1938 (age 86); Sarnia, Ontario, Canada
- Height: 6 ft 0 in (183 cm)
- Weight: 195 lb (88 kg; 13 st 13 lb)
- Position: Defence
- Shot: Left
- Played for: Detroit Red Wings
- Playing career: 1959–1965

Lloyd Ward Haddon (born August 10, 1938) is a Canadian former ice hockey player who played 8 games in the National Hockey League with the Detroit Red Wings during the 1959–60 season. The rest of his career, which lasted from 1959 to 1965, was spent in the minor leagues.

== Career statistics ==
=== Regular season and playoffs ===
			Regular season					Playoffs
Season	Team	League	GP	G	A	Pts	PIM	GP	G	A	Pts	PIM
1954–55	Hamilton Tiger Cubs	OHA	2	1	0	1	0	—	—	—	—	—
1955–56	Hamilton Tiger Cubs	OHA	34	5	1	6	4	—	—	—	—	—
1956–57	Hamilton Tiger Cubs	OHA	19	1	1	2	4	—	—	—	—	—
1957–58	Hamilton Tiger Cubs	OHA	52	9	19	28	32	15	7	8	15	10
1958–59	Hamilton Tiger Cubs	OHA	54	15	30	45	51	—	—	—	—	—
1958–59	Hershey Bears	AHL	1	0	0	0	0	—	—	—	—	—
1958–59	Edmonton Flyers	WHL	9	1	1	2	0	2	0	0	0	0
1959–60	Detroit Red Wings	NHL	8	0	0	0	2	1	0	0	0	0
1959–60	Edmonton Flyers	WHL	53	3	17	20	22	—	—	—	—	—
1960–61	Edmonton Flyers	WHL	68	15	20	35	25	—	—	—	—	—
1961–62	Edmonton Flyers	WHL	70	22	27	49	22	4	0	2	2	0
1962–63	Los Angeles Blades	WHL	70	19	32	51	4	3	1	3	4	0
1963–64	St. Louis Braves	CPHL	72	14	49	63	24	6	1	2	3	2
1964–65	Los Angeles Blades	WHL	65	7	28	35	12	—	—	—	—	—
WHL totals			335	67	125	192	85	9	1	5	6	0
NHL totals			8	0	0	0	2	1	0	0	0	0
