= 1959–60 Chicago Black Hawks season =

NHL ice hockey team season

1959–60 Chicago Black Hawks
- League: 3rd NHL
- 1959–60 record: 28–29–13
- Home record: 18–11–6
- Road record: 10–18–7
- Goals for: 191
- Goals against: 180

Team information
- General manager: Tommy Ivan
- Coach: Rudy Pilous
- Captain: Ed Litzenberger
- Arena: Chicago Stadium

Team leaders
- Goals: Bobby Hull (39)
- Assists: Bobby Hull (42)
- Points: Bobby Hull (81)
- Penalty minutes: Stan Mikita (119)
- Wins: Glenn Hall (28)
- Goals against average: Glenn Hall (2.56)

The 1959–60 Chicago Black Hawks season was the Hawks' 34th season in the NHL, and the club was coming off of a third-place finish in 1958–59, as they finished the season with a club record 28 wins, and tying a club record with 69 points, and earned their first playoff berth since 1953. Chicago then lost to the Montreal Canadiens in the first round, losing in six games.

== Regular season ==
After winning the season opener, the Black Hawks would struggle, going on a 14-game winless streak to fall into last place in the league. Chicago would snap out of their slump, and in their next 26 games, the Hawks would have a record of 11–10–5, bringing them back into the playoff race with the Boston Bruins, New York Rangers, and Detroit Red Wings. The Black Hawks would then get very hot, posting a record of 16–8–5 in their remaining 29 games to finish the season with a 28–29–13 record, which was identical to the previous season, and once again finish in third place in the league, earning a playoff spot. This was the first time since the 1940–41 and 1941–42 seasons that the Black Hawks had consecutive playoff appearances.

Offensively, Chicago was led by Bobby Hull, who scored a team record 39 goals, and finished at the top of the NHL scoring race with a club record 81 points, winning the Art Ross Trophy. Rookie Bill Hay finished second to Hull in team scoring, earning 18 goals and 55 points, and winning the Calder Memorial Trophy. Tod Sloan had another solid season, scoring 20 goals and 40 points. Pierre Pilote led the defense, scoring 7 goals and 45 points, while Stan Mikita led the club with 110 penalty minutes.

In goal, Glenn Hall played in all 70 games, winning 28 of them, while posting a 2.56 GAA, and earning 6 shutouts.

=== Season standings ===
National Hockey League
		GP	W	L	T	GF	GA	DIFF	Pts
1	Montreal Canadiens	70	40	18	12	255	178	+77	92
2	Toronto Maple Leafs	70	35	26	9	199	195	+4	79
3	Chicago Black Hawks	70	28	29	13	191	180	+11	69
4	Detroit Red Wings	70	26	29	15	186	197	−11	67
5	Boston Bruins	70	28	34	8	220	241	−21	64
6	New York Rangers	70	17	38	15	187	247	−60	49

=== Record vs. opponents ===
1959–60 NHL Records
Team	BOS	CHI	DET	MTL	NYR	TOR
Boston	—	5–6–3	5–8–1	4–8	8–4–2	6–6–2
Chicago	6–5–3	—	4–8–2	3–7–4	11–1–2	4–8–2
Detroit	8–5–1	8–4–2	—	2–7–5	4–6–4	4–9–1
Montreal	8–4	7–3–4	7–2–5	—	6–6–2	10–3–1
New York	4–8–2	1–11–2	6–4–4	6–6–2	—	2–9–3
Toronto	6–6–2	8–4–2	9–4–1	3–10–1	9–2–3	—

== Schedule and results ==
=== Regular season ===
1959–60 regular season
October

Game	Date	Visitor	Score	Home	Record	Points
1	October 7	New York Rangers	2–5	Chicago Black Hawks	1–0–0	2
2	October 10	Chicago Black Hawks	3–6	Toronto Maple Leafs	1–1–0	2
3	October 11	Toronto Maple Leafs	3–1	Chicago Black Hawks	1–2–0	2
4	October 14	Detroit Red Wings	2–0	Chicago Black Hawks	1–3–0	2
5	October 15	Chicago Black Hawks	1–2	Detroit Red Wings	1–4–0	2
6	October 18	Boston Bruins	2–2	Chicago Black Hawks	1–4–1	3
7	October 22	Chicago Black Hawks	1–4	Montreal Canadiens	1–5–1	3
8	October 25	Chicago Black Hawks	1–3	New York Rangers	1–6–1	3
9	October 27	Montreal Canadiens	2–1	Chicago Black Hawks	1–7–1	3

November

Game	Date	Visitor	Score	Home	Record	Points
10	November 1	Chicago Black Hawks	1–2	Detroit Red Wings	1–8–1	3
11	November 3	Boston Bruins	6–3	Chicago Black Hawks	1–9–1	3
12	November 7	Chicago Black Hawks	2–2	Montreal Canadiens	1–9–2	4
13	November 8	Chicago Black Hawks	3–5	Boston Bruins	1–10–2	4
14	November 10	Toronto Maple Leafs	3–1	Chicago Black Hawks	1–11–2	4
15	November 14	Chicago Black Hawks	3–3	Toronto Maple Leafs	1–11–3	5
16	November 15	Detroit Red Wings	3–5	Chicago Black Hawks	2–11–3	7
17	November 16	Chicago Black Hawks	2–3	Detroit Red Wings	2–12–3	7
18	November 18	New York Rangers	3–5	Chicago Black Hawks	3–12–3	9
19	November 22	Montreal Canadiens	3–1	Chicago Black Hawks	3–13–3	9
20	November 26	Toronto Maple Leafs	4–3	Chicago Black Hawks	3–14–3	9
21	November 28	New York Rangers	2–6	Chicago Black Hawks	4–14–3	11
22	November 29	Chicago Black Hawks	2–2	New York Rangers	4–14–4	12

December

Game	Date	Visitor	Score	Home	Record	Points
23	December 2	Boston Bruins	2–2	Chicago Black Hawks	4–14–5	13
24	December 5	Chicago Black Hawks	2–2	Montreal Canadiens	4–14–6	14
25	December 6	Chicago Black Hawks	6–3	Boston Bruins	5–14–6	16
26	December 9	Detroit Red Wings	2–0	Chicago Black Hawks	5–15–6	16
27	December 12	Chicago Black Hawks	4–2	Toronto Maple Leafs	6–15–6	18
28	December 13	Montreal Canadiens	4–4	Chicago Black Hawks	6–15–7	19
29	December 16	Boston Bruins	0–4	Chicago Black Hawks	7–15–7	21
30	December 17	Chicago Black Hawks	2–3	Detroit Red Wings	7–16–7	21
31	December 20	Toronto Maple Leafs	4–7	Chicago Black Hawks	8–16–7	23
32	December 23	Chicago Black Hawks	3–0	New York Rangers	9–16–7	25
33	December 25	Chicago Black Hawks	1–5	Boston Bruins	9–17–7	25
34	December 26	Chicago Black Hawks	2–9	Montreal Canadiens	9–18–7	25
35	December 27	Boston Bruins	1–6	Chicago Black Hawks	10–18–7	27

January

Game	Date	Visitor	Score	Home	Record	Points
36	January 1	Detroit Red Wings	4–4	Chicago Black Hawks	10–18–8	28
37	January 2	Chicago Black Hawks	4–2	Toronto Maple Leafs	11–18–8	30
38	January 3	Toronto Maple Leafs	4–0	Chicago Black Hawks	11–19–8	30
39	January 6	Chicago Black Hawks	2–1	New York Rangers	12–19–8	32
40	January 7	Chicago Black Hawks	1–5	Boston Bruins	12–20–8	32
41	January 9	Chicago Black Hawks	1–2	Montreal Canadiens	12–21–8	32
42	January 10	Montreal Canadiens	0–3	Chicago Black Hawks	13–21–8	34
43	January 13	Detroit Red Wings	2–5	Chicago Black Hawks	14–21–8	36
44	January 16	Chicago Black Hawks	1–3	Detroit Red Wings	14–22–8	36
45	January 17	New York Rangers	1–3	Chicago Black Hawks	15–22–8	38
46	January 20	Boston Bruins	1–3	Chicago Black Hawks	16–22–8	40
47	January 23	New York Rangers	1–2	Chicago Black Hawks	17–22–8	42
48	January 24	Montreal Canadiens	3–2	Chicago Black Hawks	17–23–8	42
49	January 27	Chicago Black Hawks	1–2	Toronto Maple Leafs	17–24–8	42
50	January 30	Chicago Black Hawks	2–2	Montreal Canadiens	17–24–9	43
51	January 31	Toronto Maple Leafs	3–3	Chicago Black Hawks	17–24–10	44

February

Game	Date	Visitor	Score	Home	Record	Points
52	February 4	Chicago Black Hawks	7–2	Boston Bruins	18–24–10	46
53	February 6	Chicago Black Hawks	5–1	New York Rangers	19–24–10	48
54	February 7	Chicago Black Hawks	0–5	Detroit Red Wings	19–25–10	48
55	February 10	New York Rangers	1–5	Chicago Black Hawks	20–25–10	50
56	February 14	Montreal Canadiens	0–2	Chicago Black Hawks	21–25–10	52
57	February 17	Chicago Black Hawks	5–1	New York Rangers	22–25–10	54
58	February 20	Chicago Black Hawks	1–3	Toronto Maple Leafs	22–26–10	54
59	February 21	Toronto Maple Leafs	5–7	Chicago Black Hawks	23–26–10	56
60	February 27	Boston Bruins	3–1	Chicago Black Hawks	23–27–10	56
61	February 28	Detroit Red Wings	2–5	Chicago Black Hawks	24–27–10	58

March

Game	Date	Visitor	Score	Home	Record	Points
62	March 3	Chicago Black Hawks	2–0	Boston Bruins	25–27–10	60
63	March 5	New York Rangers	0–5	Chicago Black Hawks	26–27–10	62
64	March 6	Montreal Canadiens	2–4	Chicago Black Hawks	27–27–10	64
65	March 9	Chicago Black Hawks	1–1	New York Rangers	27–27–11	65
66	March 12	Chicago Black Hawks	0–5	Montreal Canadiens	27–28–11	65
67	March 13	Detroit Red Wings	1–1	Chicago Black Hawks	27–28–12	66
68	March 15	Chicago Black Hawks	3–2	Detroit Red Wings	28–28–12	68
69	March 19	Chicago Black Hawks	0–1	Toronto Maple Leafs	28–29–12	68
70	March 20	Chicago Black Hawks	5–5	Boston Bruins	28–29–13	69

Legend: Win (2 points) Loss (0 points) Tie (1 point)

== Playoffs ==
Chicago would face the Montreal Canadiens in the best of seven NHL semi-final for the second consecutive season. The Canadiens finished the season with an NHL best 92 points, and had won four consecutive Stanley Cups. The series opened up with two games at the Montreal Forum, and the Canadiens took a 2–0 series lead by winning both games by scores of 4–3, including an overtime win in the second game. The series moved to Chicago Stadium for the next two games, however, it was the Canadiens who stayed hot, shutting out the Black Hawks 4–0 in the third game, followed by another shutout victory in the fourth game, as Montreal won the game 2–0, and swept the series in four games.

1960 Stanley Cup playoffs
Semifinals vs. (1) Montreal Canadiens – Canadiens win 4–0

Game	Date	Visitor	Score	Home	Series
1	March 24	Chicago Black Hawks	3–4	Montreal Canadiens	0–1
2	March 26	Chicago Black Hawks	3–4	Montreal Canadiens	0–2
3	March 29	Montreal Canadiens	4–0	Chicago Black Hawks	0–3
4	March 31	Montreal Canadiens	2–0	Chicago Black Hawks	0–4

Legend: Win Loss

== Player stats ==
=== Regular season ===
Scoring leaders

Player	GP	G	A	Pts	PIM
Bobby Hull	70	39	42	81	68
Bill Hay	70	18	37	55	31
Pierre Pilote	70	7	38	45	100
Tod Sloan	70	20	20	40	54
Ron Murphy	63	15	21	36	18

Goaltending

Player	GP	TOI	W	L	T	GA	SO	GAA
Glenn Hall	70	4200	28	29	13	179	6	2.56

=== Playoffs ===
Scoring leaders

Player	GP	G	A	Pts	PIM
Bill Hay	4	1	2	3	2
Kenny Wharram	4	1	1	2	0
Ted Lindsay	4	1	1	2	0
Bobby Hull	3	1	0	1	2
Ron Murphy	4	1	0	1	0

Goaltending

Player	GP	TOI	W	L	GA	SO	GAA
Glenn Hall	4	249	0	4	14	0	3.37

== See also ==
- 1959–60 NHL season
