= Marcel Bonin =

Canadian ice hockey player (1931–2025)

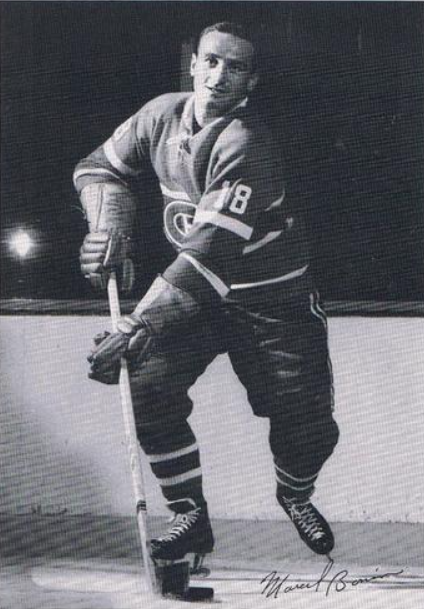
- Bonin in 1960 photo
- Born: September 8, 1931 Montreal, Quebec, Canada
- Died: January 19, 2025 (aged 93) Joliette, Quebec, Canada
- Height: 5 ft 10 in (178 cm)
- Weight: 170 lb (77 kg; 12 st 2 lb)
- Position: Left wing
- Shot: Left
- Played for: Detroit Red Wings; Boston Bruins; Montreal Canadiens
- Playing career: 1950–1962

Joseph Jacques Marcel Bonin (September 8, 1931 – January 19, 2025) was a Canadian professional ice hockey forward. He played in the National Hockey League with the Detroit Red Wings, Boston Bruins, and Montreal Canadiens between 1952 and 1962. He won the Stanley Cup four times in his career, once with Detroit and three times with Montreal.

== Playing career ==
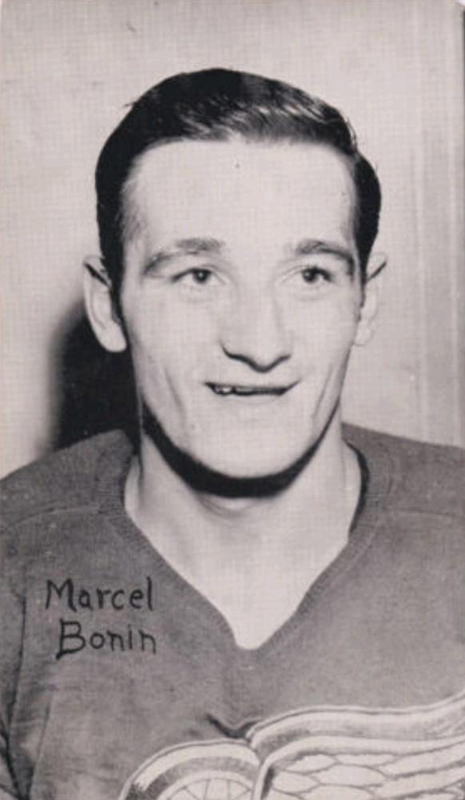
1950s postcard of Bonin for Detroit Red Wings

Bonin's National Hockey League career began in 1952 after the Red Wings bought his contract from the Quebec Aces of the Quebec Senior Hockey League.

On June 3, 1955, Bonin was dealt in a blockbuster trade to the Boston Bruins along with teammates Terry Sawchuk, Vic Stasiuk and Lorne Davis in exchange for Ed Sandford, Réal Chevrefils, Norm Corcoran, Gilles Boisvert and Warren Godfrey. After a single season with the Bruins, Bonin returned to the Quebec Aces for a season before being claimed by the Montreal Canadiens in the 1957 NHL Intra-League Draft.

Bonin won the Stanley Cup four times, doing so in 1955 with Detroit and in 1958, 1959, and 1960 with Montreal.

Bonin's career was ended following an on-ice collision with Red Wings defenceman Pete Goegan on February 9, 1962, resulting in a severe back injury.

== Death ==
Bonin died in Joliette, Quebec on January 19, 2025, at the age of 93.

== Career statistics ==
=== Regular season and playoffs ===
			Regular season					Playoffs
Season	Team	League	GP	G	A	Pts	PIM	GP	G	A	Pts	PIM
1949–50	Joliette Cyclones	QIHL	—	—	—	—	—	—	—	—	—	—
1950–51	Trois-Rivières Flambeaux	QJHL	44	30	43	73	73	8	1	6	7	7
1950–51	Shawinigan-Falls Cataracts	QMHL	2	0	1	1	0	—	—	—	—	—
1951–52	Quebec Aces	QMHL	60	15	36	51	131	15	4	9	13	32
1952–53	Quebec Aces	QMHL	4	0	2	2	9	—	—	—	—	—
1952–53	St. Louis Flyers	AHL	24	7	23	30	21	—	—	—	—	—
1952–53	Detroit Red Wings	NHL	37	4	9	13	14	5	0	1	1	0
1953–54	Sherbrooke Saints	QHL	17	10	11	21	38	—	—	—	—	—
1953–54	Edmonton Flyers	WHL	43	16	33	49	53	13	5	6	11	30
1953–54	Detroit Red Wings	NHL	1	0	0	0	0	—	—	—	—	—
1954–55	Detroit Red Wings	NHL	69	16	20	36	53	11	0	2	2	4
1955–56	Boston Bruins	NHL	67	9	9	18	49	—	—	—	—	—
1956–57	Quebec Aces	QHL	68	20	60	80	88	10	5	9	14	14
1957–58	Montreal Canadiens	NHL	66	15	24	39	37	9	0	1	1	12
1958–59	Rochester Americans	AHL	7	3	5	8	4	—	—	—	—	—
1958–59	Montreal Canadiens	NHL	57	13	30	43	38	11	10	5	15	4
1959–60	Montreal Canadiens	NHL	59	17	34	51	59	8	1	4	5	12
1960–61	Montreal Canadiens	NHL	65	16	35	51	45	6	0	1	1	29
1961–62	Montreal Canadiens	NHL	33	7	14	21	41	—	—	—	—	—
NHL totals			454	97	175	272	336	50	11	14	25	51

== Awards and achievements ==
- Stanley Cup champion - 1955, 1958, 1959, 1960
- NHL All-Star Game roster - 1954, 1957, 1958, 1959, 1960
