= Marc Reaume =

Canadian ice hockey player

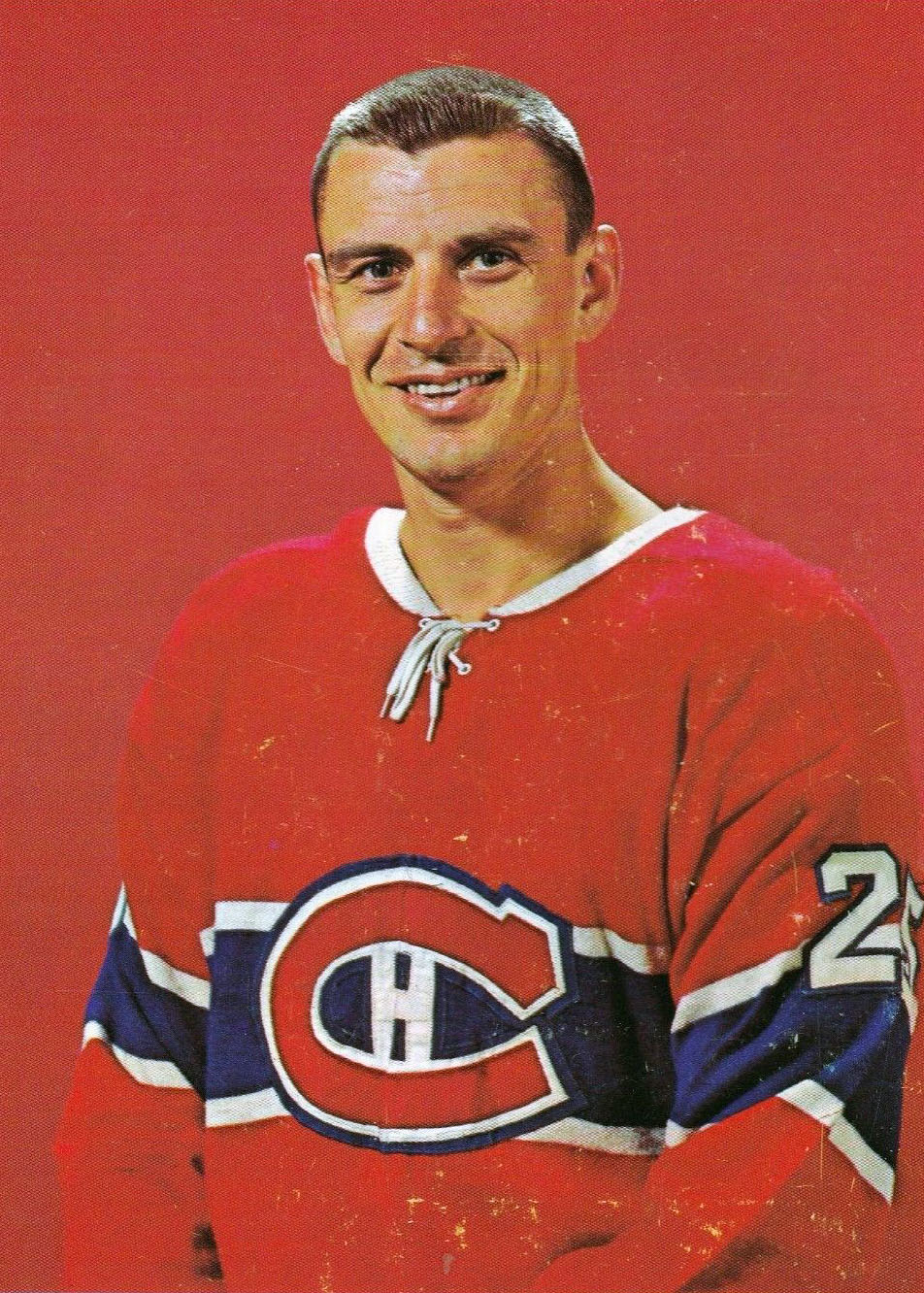
- Born: February 7, 1934 (age 92) LaSalle, Ontario, Canada
- Height: 6 ft 1 in (185 cm)
- Weight: 185 lb (84 kg; 13 st 3 lb)
- Position: Defence
- Shot: Left
- Played for: Vancouver Canucks; Montreal Canadiens; Detroit Red Wings; Toronto Maple Leafs
- Playing career: 1954–1971

Marc Avellin Reaume (born February 7, 1934) is a Canadian former professional ice hockey defenceman who played 344 games in the National Hockey League. He played with the Toronto Maple Leafs, Detroit Red Wings, Montreal Canadiens, and Vancouver Canucks, as well as for several teams in the minor American Hockey League in a career that lasted from 1954 until 1971.

== Career statistics ==
=== Regular season and playoffs ===
			Regular season					Playoffs
Season	Team	League	GP	G	A	Pts	PIM	GP	G	A	Pts	PIM
1950–51	St. Michael's Buzzers	MetJHL	—	—	—	—	—	—	—	—	—	—
1950–51	St. Michael's Majors	OHA	5	0	0	0	2	—	—	—	—	—
1951–52	St. Michael's Majors	OHA	46	11	16	27	44	7	1	2	3	8
1952–53	St. Michael's Majors	OHA	46	5	16	21	75	17	0	3	3	16
1953–54	St. Michael's Majors	OHA	54	14	27	41	24	8	3	6	9	6
1954–55	Toronto Maple Leafs	NHL	1	0	0	0	4	4	0	0	0	2
1954–55	Pittsburgh Hornets	AHL	57	5	7	12	63	6	0	0	0	4
1955–56	Toronto Maple Leafs	NHL	48	0	12	12	50	5	0	2	2	6
1955–56	Pittsburgh Hornets	AHL	16	2	5	7	24	—	—	—	—	—
1956–57	Toronto Maple Leafs	NHL	63	6	14	20	81	—	—	—	—	—
1957–58	Toronto Maple Leafs	NHL	68	1	7	8	49	—	—	—	—	—
1958–59	Toronto Maple Leafs	NHL	51	1	5	6	67	10	0	0	0	0
1959–60	Toronto Maple Leafs	NHL	36	0	1	1	6	—	—	—	—	—
1959–60	Detroit Red Wings	NHL	9	0	1	1	2	2	0	0	0	0
1960–61	Detroit Red Wings	NHL	38	0	1	1	8	—	—	—	—	—
1960–61	Hershey Bears	AHL	33	2	7	9	30	8	0	1	1	4
1961–62	Hershey Bears	AHL	70	3	18	21	42	7	1	2	3	6
1962–63	Hershey Bears	AHL	69	5	23	28	42	13	2	4	6	34
1963–64	Montreal Canadiens	NHL	3	0	0	0	2	—	—	—	—	—
1963–64	Hershey Bears	AHL	69	5	23	28	45	6	1	0	1	2
1964–65	Tulsa Oilers	CHL	68	4	28	32	31	12	0	7	7	6
1965–66	Rochester Americans	AHL	2	0	3	3	2	—	—	—	—	—
1965–66	Tulsa Oilers	CHL	68	8	25	33	43	11	1	0	1	0
1966–67	Tulsa Oilers	CHL	62	7	18	25	59	—	—	—	—	—
1966–67	Rochester Americans	AHL	2	0	0	0	0	—	—	—	—	—
1967–68	Rochester Americans	AHL	70	8	22	30	40	11	2	4	6	10
1968–69	Rochester Americans	AHL	11	0	6	6	2	—	—	—	—	—
1968–69	Vancouver Canucks	WHL	59	4	19	23	31	8	3	7	10	2
1969–70	Vancouver Canucks	WHL	72	10	25	35	36	11	2	11	13	6
1970–71	Vancouver Canucks	NHL	27	0	2	2	4	—	—	—	—	—
1970–71	Rochester Americans	AHL	6	0	3	3	6	—	—	—	—	—
AHL totals			405	30	117	147	296	51	6	11	17	60
NHL totals			344	8	43	51	273	21	0	2	2	8
