= Gilles Boisvert (ice hockey) =

Canadian ice hockey player (1933–2022)

- Gilles Boisvert in 1955
- Born: February 15, 1933 Trois-Rivières, Quebec, Canada
- Died: September 29, 2022 (aged 89) Pasadena, Maryland, U.S.
- Height: 5 ft 8 in (173 cm)
- Weight: 170 lb (77 kg; 12 st 2 lb)
- Position: Goaltender
- Caught: Left
- NHL team: Detroit Red Wings
- Playing career: 1953–1970

Jean Gilles Louis Georges Boisvert (February 15, 1933 – September 29, 2022) was a Canadian ice hockey player who played three games for the Detroit Red Wings in the National Hockey League during the 1959–60 season. The rest of his career, which lasted from 1953 to 1970, was spent in various minor leagues.

== Career statistics ==
=== Regular season and playoffs ===
			Regular season									Playoffs
Season	Team	League	GP	W	L	T	MIN	GA	SO	GAA	SV%	GP	W	L	MIN	GA	SO	GAA	SV%
1949–50	Trois-Rivieres Reds	QJHL-B	20	14	5	1	1220	64	3	3.15	—	4	1	3	240	17	0	4.25	—
1950–51	Trois-Rivieres Reds	QJHL-B	5	2	3	0	300	19	1	3.80	—	—	—	—	—	—	—	—	—
1951–52	Trois-Rivieres Reds	QJHL-B	—	—	—	—	—	—	—	—	—	5	0	5	309	19	0	3.69	—
1952–53	Kitchener Canucks	OHA	51	—	—	—	3060	217	0	4.25	—	—	—	—	—	—	—	—	—
1953–54	Amherst Meteors	NBSHL	40	18	19	2	2410	152	0	3.78	—	7	2	5	436	27	1	3.72	—
1953–54	Sydney Millionaires	MMHL	9	5	4	0	543	21	3	2.32	—	3	2	1	180	4	1	1.33	—
1954–55	Montreal Royals	QSHL	7	3	3	0	393	21	0	3.21	—	14	7	7	840	41	2	2.93	—
1954–55	Hershey Bears	AHL	5	4	1	0	300	11	1	2.20	—	—	—	—	—	—	—	—	—
1955–56	Edmonton Flyers	WHL	60	30	28	2	3669	214	2	3.50	—	—	—	—	—	—	—	—	—
1956–57	Hull-Ottawa Canadiens	QSHL	10	5	3	1	574	23	0	2.40	—	—	—	—	—	—	—	—	—
1956–57	Rochester Americans	AHL	1	1	0	0	60	1	0	1.00	—	—	—	—	—	—	—	—	—
1956–57	Hull-Ottawa Canadiens	EOHL	17	—	—	—	1000	54	1	3.24	—	—	—	—	—	—	—	—	—
1957–58	Chicoutimi Sagueneens	QSHL	51	31	16	4	3060	150	5	2.94	—	6	2	4	373	13	1	2.09	—
1958–59	Chicoutimi Sagueneens	QSHL	51	23	27	1	3060	190	1	3.73	—	—	—	—	—	—	—	—	—
1959–60	Detroit Red Wings	NHL	3	0	3	0	180	9	0	3.00	.890	—	—	—	—	—	—	—	—
1959–60	Cleveland Barons	AHL	24	13	6	5	1440	67	2	2.79	—	—	—	—	—	—	—	—	—
1959–60	Edmonton Flyers	WHL	11	7	4	0	660	39	0	3.55	—	—	—	—	—	—	—	—	—
1959–60	Sudbury Wolves	EPHL	12	5	5	1	690	47	0	4.09	—	—	—	—	—	—	—	—	—
1960–61	Ottawa Senators	OCHL	17	—	—	—	1020	54	2	3.17	—	—	—	—	—	—	—	—	—
1960–61	Spokane Comets	WHL	36	16	19	0	2113	137	2	3.89	—	—	—	—	—	—	—	—	—
1960–61	Calgary Stampeders	WHL	3	1	2	0	180	12	0	4.00	—	—	—	—	—	—	—	—	—
1961–62	Hershey Bears	AHL	4	1	2	0	200	12	0	3.60	—	—	—	—	—	—	—	—	—
1961–62	Sudbury Wolves	EPHL	5	1	2	2	300	23	0	4.60	—	—	—	—	—	—	—	—	—
1961–62	Edmonton Flyers	WHL	44	23	18	3	2659	157	2	3.54	—	12	8	4	722	43	0	3.57	—
1962–63	Pittsburgh Hornets	AHL	12	3	8	1	720	58	1	4.83	—	—	—	—	—	—	—	—	—
1962–63	Edmonton Flyers	WHL	47	21	26	0	2820	174	0	3.70	—	3	1	2	182	9	0	2.97	—
1963–64	St. Paul Rangers	CHL	3	0	3	0	180	15	0	5.00	—	—	—	—	—	—	—	—	—
1963–64	Baltimore Clippers	AHL	7	1	4	1	420	27	0	3.86	—	—	—	—	—	—	—	—	—
1964–65	Vancouver Canucks	WHL	10	5	5	0	600	28	1	2.80	—	—	—	—	—	—	—	—	—
1964–65	Baltimore Clippers	AHL	26	15	8	3	1570	89	0	3.40	—	—	—	—	—	—	—	—	—
1965–66	Baltimore Clippers	AHL	28	9	17	0	1601	100	0	3.75	—	—	—	—	—	—	—	—	—
1966–67	Baltimore Clippers	AHL	3	1	0	1	140	6	1	2.57	—	1	0	0	15	2	0	8.00	—
1967–68	Baltimore Clippers	AHL	18	5	9	2	1030	59	2	3.44	—	—	—	—	—	—	—	—	—
1968–69	Baltimore Clippers	AHL	16	9	5	2	956	49	2	3.08	—	1	0	0	40	2	0	3.00	—
1969–70	Baltimore Clippers	AHL	3	1	0	0	90	4	0	2.67	—	—	—	—	—	—	—	—	—
AHL totals			147	63	60	15	8527	483	9	3.40	—	2	0	0	55	4	0	4.36	—
WHL totals			211	98	102	5	12,701	761	7	3.59	—	2	0	0	55	4	0	4.36	—
NHL totals			3	0	3	0	180	9	0	3.00	.890	—	—	—	—	—	—	—	—
