= Garry Edmundson =

Canadian ice hockey player

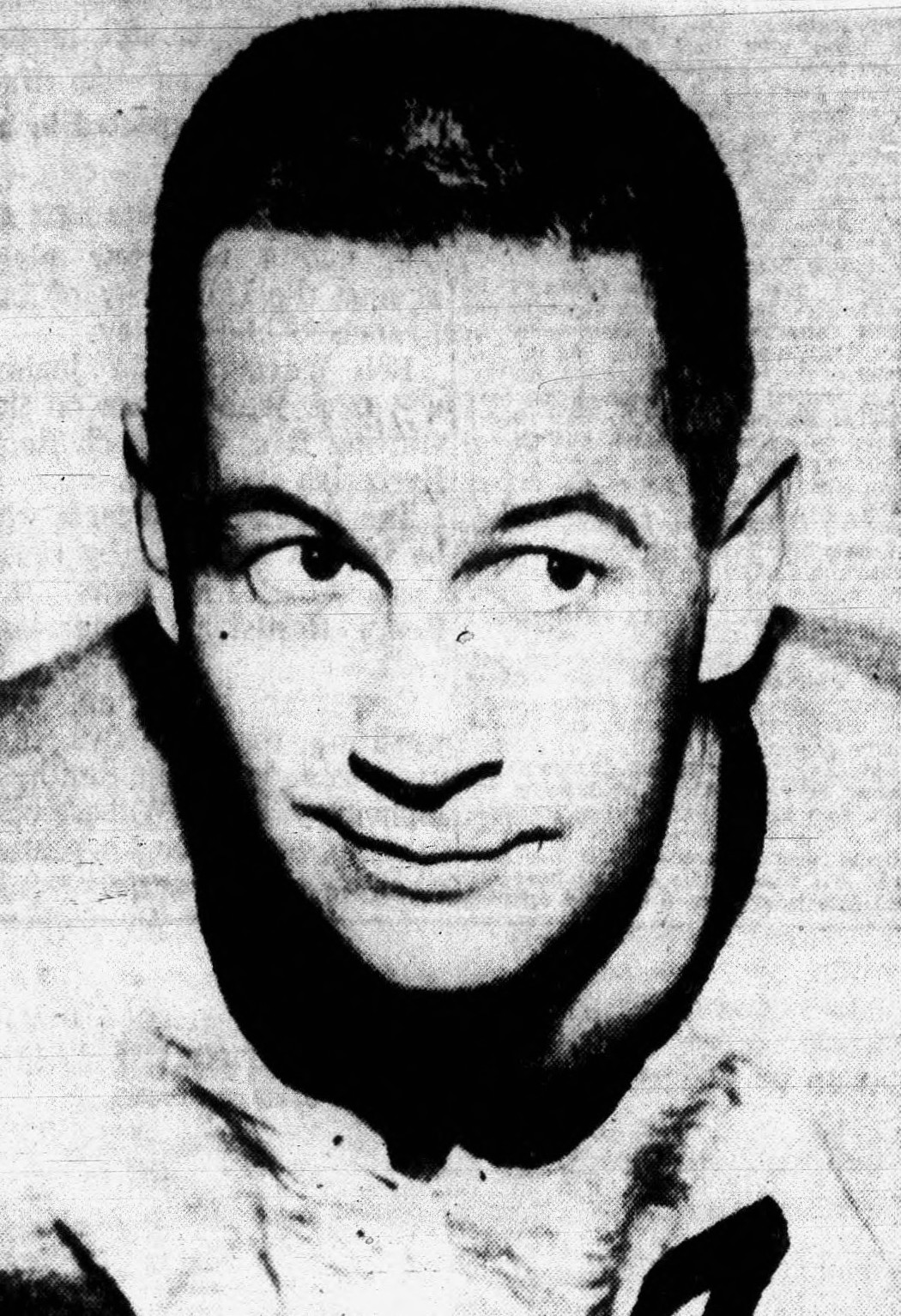
- Edmundson, circa 1962
- Born: May 6, 1932 Sexsmith, Alberta, Canada
- Died: September 20, 2016 (aged 84) Newport Beach, California, U.S.
- Height: 6 ft 0 in (183 cm)
- Weight: 175 lb (79 kg; 12 st 7 lb)
- Position: Defence
- Shot: Left
- Played for: Toronto Maple Leafs; Montreal Canadiens
- Playing career: 1952–1964

Garry Frank "Duke" Edmundson (May 6, 1932 – September 20, 2016) was a Canadian professional ice hockey player who played 43 games in the National Hockey League with the Toronto Maple Leafs and Montreal Canadiens between 1952 and 1960. The rest of his career, which lasted from 1952 to 1964, was spent in the minor leagues. He died in Newport Beach, California.

== Career statistics ==
=== Regular season and playoffs ===
| | | | Regular season | | | | | Playoffs |
| Season | Team | League | GP | G | A | Pts | PIM | GP | G | A | Pts | PIM |
|---|---|---|---|---|---|---|---|---|---|---|---|---|
| 1948–49 | Edmonton Athletic Club | EJrHL | — | 5 | 10 | 15 | 14 | 6 | 2 | 2 | 4 | 16 |
| 1948–49 | Edmonton Athletic Club | M-Cup | — | — | — | — | — | 7 | 1 | 1 | 2 | 4 |
| 1949–50 | Edmonton Athletic Club | AAHA | — | 19 | 13 | 32 | 11 | — | — | — | — | — |
| 1950–51 | Regina Pats | WCJHL | 23 | 12 | 6 | 18 | 38 | 12 | 11 | 8 | 19 | 13 |
| 1950–51 | Regina Pats | M-Cup | — | — | — | — | — | 15 | 7 | 6 | 13 | 18 |
| 1951–52 | Montreal Canadiens | NHL | 1 | 0 | 0 | 0 | 2 | 2 | 0 | 0 | 0 | 4 |
| 1951–52 | Kitchener Greenshirts | OHA | 51 | 35 | 53 | 88 | 80 | 4 | 1 | 1 | 2 | 6 |
| 1952–53 | Montreal Royals | QSHL | 12 | 4 | 3 | 7 | 8 | 12 | 3 | 4 | 7 | 16 |
| 1953–54 | Cincinnati Mohawks | IHL | 64 | 25 | 53 | 78 | 105 | 11 | 2 | 4 | 6 | 9 |
| 1954–55 | Cincinnati Mohawks | IHL | 60 | 24 | 32 | 56 | 86 | 9 | 3 | 6 | 9 | 20 |
| 1955–56 | Cincinnati Mohawks | IHL | 56 | 35 | 52 | 87 | 95 | 8 | 3 | 3 | 6 | 10 |
| 1955–56 | Winnipeg Warriors | WHL | 2 | 0 | 0 | 0 | 2 | — | — | — | — | — |
| 1956–57 | Shawinigan Falls Cataracts | QSHL | 3 | 0 | 1 | 1 | 16 | — | — | — | — | — |
| 1956–57 | Cincinnati Mohawks | IHL | 52 | 23 | 25 | 48 | 74 | 7 | 3 | 5 | 8 | 28 |
| 1957–58 | New Westminster Royals | WHL | 69 | 21 | 43 | 64 | 188 | 4 | 1 | 3 | 4 | 2 |
| 1958–59 | Springfield Indians | AHL | 62 | 17 | 27 | 44 | 113 | — | — | — | — | — |
| 1959–60 | Toronto Maple Leafs | NHL | 39 | 4 | 6 | 10 | 47 | 9 | 0 | 1 | 1 | 4 |
| 1960–61 | Toronto Maple Leafs | NHL | 3 | 0 | 0 | 0 | 0 | — | — | — | — | — |
| 1960–61 | Rochester Americans | AHL | 68 | 25 | 44 | 69 | 62 | — | — | — | — | — |
| 1961–62 | San Francisco Seals | WHL | 51 | 15 | 21 | 36 | 53 | 2 | 0 | 0 | 0 | 0 |
| 1962–63 | San Francisco Seals | WHL | 70 | 34 | 42 | 76 | 96 | 17 | 5 | 3 | 8 | 12 |
| 1963–64 | San Francisco Seals | WHL | 46 | 13 | 21 | 34 | 55 | — | — | — | — | — |
| IHL totals | | | 232 | 107 | 162 | 269 | 360 | 35 | 11 | 18 | 29 | 67 |
| WHL totals | | | 238 | 83 | 127 | 210 | 394 | 23 | 6 | 6 | 12 | 14 |
| NHL totals | | | 43 | 4 | 6 | 10 | 49 | 11 | 0 | 1 | 1 | 8 |

== Awards and achievements ==
- IHL First All-Star Team (1956)
- IHL Second All-Star Team (1957)
