= 1960–61 NHL transactions =

The following is a list of all team-to-team transactions that have occurred in the National Hockey League (NHL) during the 1960–61 NHL season. It lists which team each player has been traded to and for which player(s) or other consideration(s), if applicable.

== Transactions ==
June 1, 1960	To Boston Bruins Claude Dufour	To Detroit Red Wings Al Millar; Myron Stankiewicz
June 5, 1960	To Detroit Red Wings Howie Glover	To Chicago Black Hawks Jim Morrison
June 6, 1960	To Boston Bruins Billy Carter	To Montreal Canadiens cash
June 7, 1960	To Montreal Canadiens cash	To Detroit Red Wings Al Johnson
June 7, 1960	To Toronto Maple Leafs Stan Smrke	To Montreal Canadiens Al MacNeil
June 7, 1960	To Toronto Maple Leafs Guy Rousseau	To Montreal Canadiens cash
June 7, 1960	To Montreal Canadiens Lorne Ferguson; Terry Gray rights to Bob Bailey rights to Danny Lewicki rights to Glen Skov	To Chicago Black Hawks Bob Courcy; Reggie Fleming; Cecil Hoekstra; Ab McDonald
August, 1960 (exact date unknown)	To Detroit Red Wings Pete Conacher	To New York Rangers Barry Cullen
November 7, 1960	To Toronto Maple Leafs Eddie Shack	To New York Rangers Pat Hannigan; Johnny Wilson
November 27, 1960	To Boston Bruins Andre Pronovost	To Montreal Canadiens Jean-Guy Gendron
January, 1961 (exact date unknown)	To Detroit Red Wings rights to Billy McNeill	To New York Rangers cash
January 23, 1961	To Boston Bruins Gary Aldcorn; Tom McCarthy; Murray Oliver	To Detroit Red Wings Leo Labine; Vic Stasiuk
January 31, 1961	To Toronto Maple Leafs Don Simmons	To Boston Bruins Ed Chadwick
