= 1960–61 Detroit Red Wings season =

Sports season

1960–61 Detroit Red Wings
- League: 4th NHL
- 1960–61 record: 25–29–16
- Home record: 15–13–7
- Road record: 10–16–9
- Goals for: 195
- Goals against: 215

Team information
- General manager: Jack Adams
- Coach: Sid Abel
- Captain: Gordie Howe
- Alternate captains: Alex Delvecchio; Marcel Pronovost
- Arena: Detroit Olympia

Team leaders
- Goals: Norm Ullman (28)
- Assists: Gordie Howe (49)
- Points: Gordie Howe (72)
- Penalty minutes: Howie Young (108)
- Wins: Hank Bassen (13)
- Goals against average: Hank Bassen (2.93)

The 1960–61 Detroit Red Wings season saw the Red Wings finish in fourth place in the National Hockey League (NHL) with a record of 25 wins, 29 losses, and 16 ties for 66 points. They defeated the Toronto Maple Leafs in six games in the Semi-finals before losing the Stanley Cup Final in six games to the Chicago Black Hawks.

== Regular season ==
=== Final standings ===
National Hockey League
		GP	W	L	T	GF	GA	DIFF	Pts
1	Montreal Canadiens	70	41	19	10	254	188	+66	92
2	Toronto Maple Leafs	70	39	19	12	234	176	+58	90
3	Chicago Black Hawks	70	29	24	17	198	180	+18	75
4	Detroit Red Wings	70	25	29	16	195	215	−20	66
5	New York Rangers	70	22	38	10	204	248	−44	54
6	Boston Bruins	70	15	42	13	176	254	−78	43

=== Record vs. opponents ===
1960–61 NHL Records
Team	BOS	CHI	DET	MTL	NYR	TOR
Boston	—	4–6–4	4–8–2	2–10–2	3–9–2	2–9–3
Chicago	6–4–4	—	6–4–4	5–5–4	7–4–3	5–7–2
Detroit	8–4–2	4–6–4	—	4–7–3	7–5–2	2–7–5
Montreal	10–2–2	5–5–4	7–4–3	—	11–2–1	8–6
New York	9–3–2	4–7–3	5–7–2	2–11–1	—	2–10–2
Toronto	9–2–3	7–5–2	7–2–5	6–8	10–2–2	—

== Schedule and results ==
1960–61 regular season
October

Game	Result	Date	Score	Opponent	Record
1	T	October 5, 1960	1–1	@ Chicago Black Hawks (1960–61)	0–0–1
2	L	October 6, 1960	2–4	Chicago Black Hawks (1960–61)	0–1–1
3	T	October 9, 1960	3–3	Toronto Maple Leafs (1960–61)	0–1–2
4	T	October 11, 1960	3–3	@ Boston Bruins (1960–61)	0–1–3
5	L	October 13, 1960	3–4	@ Montreal Canadiens (1960–61)	0–2–3
6	W	October 16, 1960	6–4	Montreal Canadiens (1960–61)	1–2–3
7	W	October 20, 1960	5–0	Boston Bruins (1960–61)	2–2–3
8	W	October 22, 1960	2–1	@ Toronto Maple Leafs (1960–61)	3–2–3
9	L	October 23, 1960	1–3	Toronto Maple Leafs (1960–61)	3–3–3
10	L	October 26, 1960	3–4	@ New York Rangers (1960–61)	3–4–3
11	W	October 30, 1960	2–1	Chicago Black Hawks (1960–61)	4–4–3

November

Game	Result	Date	Score	Opponent	Record
12	W	November 3, 1960	8–5	Boston Bruins (1960–61)	5–4–3
13	W	November 6, 1960	5–2	New York Rangers (1960–61)	6–4–3
14	W	November 9, 1960	4–3	@ New York Rangers (1960–61)	7–4–3
15	W	November 10, 1960	4–1	@ Boston Bruins (1960–61)	8–4–3
16	L	November 12, 1960	2–4	@ Montreal Canadiens (1960–61)	8–5–3
17	L	November 13, 1960	1–7	@ Chicago Black Hawks (1960–61)	8–6–3
18	W	November 15, 1960	3–2	Chicago Black Hawks (1960–61)	9–6–3
19	T	November 16, 1960	3–3	@ Toronto Maple Leafs (1960–61)	9–6–4
20	L	November 19, 1960	4–6	@ Boston Bruins (1960–61)	9–7–4
21	W	November 20, 1960	4–3	@ New York Rangers (1960–61)	10–7–4
22	W	November 24, 1960	3–1	Montreal Canadiens (1960–61)	11–7–4
23	T	November 26, 1960	3–3	@ Toronto Maple Leafs (1960–61)	11–7–5
24	W	November 27, 1960	2–0	Toronto Maple Leafs (1960–61)	12–7–5

December

Game	Result	Date	Score	Opponent	Record
25	L	December 1, 1960	2–3	Boston Bruins (1960–61)	12–8–5
26	L	December 4, 1960	1–4	New York Rangers (1960–61)	12–9–5
27	W	December 7, 1960	3–1	@ New York Rangers (1960–61)	13–9–5
28	L	December 10, 1960	4–6	@ Montreal Canadiens (1960–61)	13–10–5
29	L	December 11, 1960	1–5	Montreal Canadiens (1960–61)	13–11–5
30	T	December 15, 1960	1–1	New York Rangers (1960–61)	13–11–6
31	W	December 18, 1960	3–2	@ Chicago Black Hawks (1960–61)	14–11–6
32	T	December 24, 1960	4–4	@ Toronto Maple Leafs (1960–61)	14–11–7
33	L	December 25, 1960	0–3	Chicago Black Hawks (1960–61)	14–12–7
34	W	December 28, 1960	4–3	@ New York Rangers (1960–61)	15–12–7
35	T	December 29, 1960	1–1	@ Montreal Canadiens (1960–61)	15–12–8
36	L	December 31, 1960	0–3	Chicago Black Hawks (1960–61)	15–13–8

January

Game	Result	Date	Score	Opponent	Record
37	L	January 1, 1961	0–3	@ Chicago Black Hawks (1960–61)	15–14–8
38	L	January 4, 1961	4–6	@ Toronto Maple Leafs (1960–61)	15–15–8
39	L	January 5, 1961	1–4	Toronto Maple Leafs (1960–61)	15–16–8
40	W	January 8, 1961	5–3	Boston Bruins (1960–61)	16–16–8
41	T	January 11, 1961	2–2	@ Chicago Black Hawks (1960–61)	16–16–9
42	T	January 14, 1961	2–2	New York Rangers (1960–61)	16–16–10
43	T	January 15, 1961	4–4	Montreal Canadiens (1960–61)	16–16–11
44	L	January 19, 1961	2–4	@ Boston Bruins (1960–61)	16–17–11
45	W	January 21, 1961	3–2	@ Montreal Canadiens (1960–61)	17–17–11
46	L	January 22, 1961	3–5	New York Rangers (1960–61)	17–18–11
47	T	January 26, 1961	2–2	Chicago Black Hawks (1960–61)	17–18–12
48	T	January 28, 1961	3–3	@ Montreal Canadiens (1960–61)	17–18–13
49	W	January 29, 1961	3–1	@ Boston Bruins (1960–61)	18–18–13

February

Game	Result	Date	Score	Opponent	Record
50	L	February 2, 1961	0–5	Toronto Maple Leafs (1960–61)	18–19–13
51	L	February 4, 1961	2–4	@ Toronto Maple Leafs (1960–61)	18–20–13
52	W	February 5, 1961	7–2	Montreal Canadiens (1960–61)	19–20–13
53	L	February 8, 1961	2–5	@ Chicago Black Hawks (1960–61)	19–21–13
54	W	February 9, 1961	4–2	New York Rangers (1960–61)	20–21–13
55	L	February 12, 1961	2–4	Toronto Maple Leafs (1960–61)	20–22–13
56	W	February 18, 1961	5–1	Boston Bruins (1960–61)	21–22–13
57	L	February 19, 1961	2–4	Montreal Canadiens (1960–61)	21–23–13
58	T	February 23, 1961	3–3	Boston Bruins (1960–61)	21–23–14
59	L	February 25, 1961	1–3	@ Toronto Maple Leafs (1960–61)	21–24–14
60	T	February 26, 1961	2–2	Toronto Maple Leafs (1960–61)	21–24–15
61	W	February 28, 1961	3–1	Chicago Black Hawks (1960–61)	22–24–15

March

Game	Result	Date	Score	Opponent	Record
62	L	March 2, 1961	2–4	@ Boston Bruins (1960–61)	22–25–15
63	L	March 4, 1961	4–6	@ Montreal Canadiens (1960–61)	22–26–15
64	L	March 5, 1961	3–8	@ New York Rangers (1960–61)	22–27–15
65	W	March 7, 1961	3–1	Boston Bruins (1960–61)	23–27–15
66	W	March 9, 1961	5–2	@ Boston Bruins (1960–61)	24–27–15
67	L	March 12, 1961	3–7	@ New York Rangers (1960–61)	24–28–15
68	W	March 14, 1961	5–2	New York Rangers (1960–61)	25–28–15
69	T	March 15, 1961	2–2	@ Chicago Black Hawks (1960–61)	25–28–16
70	L	March 19, 1961	0–2	Montreal Canadiens (1960–61)	25–29–16

Legend: Win (2 points) Loss (0 points) Tie (1 point)

== Player statistics ==
=== Regular season ===
Scoring

Player	Pos	GP	G	A	Pts	PIM
Gordie Howe	RW	64	23	49	72	30
Norm Ullman	C	70	28	42	70	34
Alex Delvecchio	C/LW	70	27	35	62	26
Allan Johnson	RW/C	70	16	21	37	14
Pete Goegan	D	67	5	29	34	78
Howie Glover	RW	66	21	8	29	46
Parker MacDonald	C	70	14	12	26	6
Gerry Melnyk	C	70	9	16	25	2
Murray Oliver	C	49	11	12	23	8
Vic Stasiuk	LW	23	10	13	23	16
Warren Godfrey	D	63	3	16	19	62
Len Lunde	C	53	6	12	18	10
Val Fonteyne	LW	66	6	11	17	4
Marcel Pronovost	D	70	6	11	17	44
Leo Labine	RW	24	2	9	11	32
Gary Aldcorn	LW	49	2	6	8	16
Howie Young	D/RW	29	0	8	8	108
Gerry Odrowski	D	68	1	4	5	45
John McKenzie	RW	16	3	1	4	13
Brian Smith	LW	26	0	2	2	10
Len Haley	RW	3	1	0	1	2
Claude Laforge	LW	10	1	0	1	2
Hank Bassen	G	35	0	1	1	6
Bruce MacGregor	C	12	0	1	1	0
Marc Reaume	D	38	0	1	1	8
Terry Sawchuk	G	37	0	1	1	8
Edward Diachuk	LW	12	0	0	0	19
Rich Healey	D	1	0	0	0	2

Goaltending

Player	MIN	GP	W	L	T	GA	GAA	SO
Hank Bassen	2050	35	13	13	8	100	2.93	0
Terry Sawchuk	2150	37	12	16	8	112	3.13	2
Team:	4200	70	25	29	16	212	3.03	2

=== Playoffs ===
Scoring

Player	Pos	GP	G	A	Pts	PIM
Gordie Howe	RW	11	4	11	15	10
Alex Delvecchio	C/LW	11	4	5	9	0
Vic Stasiuk	LW	11	2	5	7	4
Leo Labine	RW	11	3	2	5	4
Val Fonteyne	LW	11	2	3	5	0
Marcel Pronovost	D	9	2	3	5	0
Allan Johnson	RW/C	11	2	2	4	6
Howie Young	D/RW	11	2	2	4	30
Norm Ullman	C	11	0	4	4	4
Howie Glover	RW	11	1	2	3	2
Bruce MacGregor	C	8	1	2	3	6
Len Lunde	C	10	2	0	2	0
Warren Godfrey	D	11	0	2	2	18
Parker MacDonald	C	9	1	0	1	0
Gerry Melnyk	C	11	1	0	1	2
Pete Goegan	D	11	0	1	1	18
Hank Bassen	G	4	0	0	0	0
Gerry Odrowski	D	10	0	0	0	4
Terry Sawchuk	G	8	0	0	0	0

Goaltending

Player	MIN	GP	W	L	GA	GAA	SO
Terry Sawchuk	465	8	5	3	18	2.32	1
Hank Bassen	220	4	1	2	9	2.45	0
Team:	685	11	6	5	27	2.36	1

Note: GP = Games played; G = Goals; A = Assists; Pts = Points; +/- = Plus-minus PIM = Penalty minutes; PPG = Power-play goals; SHG = Short-handed goals; GWG = Game-winning goals;
MIN = Minutes played; W = Wins; L = Losses; T = Ties; GA = Goals against; GAA = Goals-against average; SO = Shutouts;
