= 1960–61 Boston Bruins season =

NHL team season

1960–61 Boston Bruins
- League: 6th NHL
- 1960–61 record: 15–42–13
- Home record: 13–17–5
- Road record: 2–25–8
- Goals for: 176
- Goals against: 254

Team information
- General manager: Lynn Patrick
- Coach: Milt Schmidt
- Captain: Fernie Flaman
- Arena: Boston Garden

Team leaders
- Goals: Don McKenney (26)
- Assists: Jerry Toppazzini (35)
- Points: Jerry Toppazzini (50)
- Penalty minutes: Jim Bartlett (95)
- Wins: Bruce Gamble (12)
- Goals against average: Don Simmons (3.23)

The 1960–61 Boston Bruins season was the Bruins' 37th season in the NHL the Bruins missed the playoffs in back to back years for the first time since the 1924–25 season and the 1925–26 season.

== Offseason ==
=== Trades and Transfers ===
- June 7: The Boston Bruins purchase centre Billy Carter from the Montreal Canadiens for a reported sum of over $20000.

== Regular season Overview ==
October 6: Boston 1 ─ New York 2

The Bruins began their season with a loss away against the New York Rangers.

Period 1: At 7:30 the Rangers scored after Andy Bathgate flicked the puck into the net on a pass from Bill Gadsby. At 17:36 the Bruins scored via Doug Mohns taking a loose puck on a power play in front of the net due to Rangers Len in front of the net.

Period 3: At 6:13 Len Ronson scored for the Rangers by tipping the puck into the net after a blue-line shot by Jim Morrison.

October 8: Boston 1 ─ Montreal 1

The second game of the Bruins' season ended in a 1─1 tie against the Montreal Canadiens.

Period 1: At 10:45 the Canadiens scored on a power play caused by Fern Flaman hooking. Dickie Moore tipped the puck past Don Simmons on a blast by Bernie Geoffrion.

Period 2: At 18:12 the Bruins scored after Leo Labine used Montreal's Doug Harvey as a screen to score from an angle.

== Regular season ==
=== Trades and Transfers ===
- November 27: The Boston Bruins trade Jean-Guy Gendron to the Montreal Canadiens in exchange for André Pronovost.
- January 24: The Boston Bruins complete a five-player trade with the Detroit Red Wings: The Bruins receive left-wingers Gary Aldcorn and Tom McCarthy as well as centre Murray Oliver; the Red Wings receive right-wingers Vic Stasiuk and Leo Labine.
- January 30: The Boston Bruins trade Don Simmons to the Toronto Maple Leafs in exchange for Ed Chadwick.

=== Final standings ===
National Hockey League
		GP	W	L	T	GF	GA	DIFF	Pts
1	Montreal Canadiens	70	41	19	10	254	188	+66	92
2	Toronto Maple Leafs	70	39	19	12	234	176	+58	90
3	Chicago Black Hawks	70	29	24	17	198	180	+18	75
4	Detroit Red Wings	70	25	29	16	195	215	−20	66
5	New York Rangers	70	22	38	10	204	248	−44	54
6	Boston Bruins	70	15	42	13	176	254	−78	43

=== Record vs. opponents ===
1960–61 NHL Records
Team	BOS	CHI	DET	MTL	NYR	TOR
Boston	—	4–6–4	4–8–2	2–10–2	3–9–2	2–9–3
Chicago	6–4–4	—	6–4–4	5–5–4	7–4–3	5–7–2
Detroit	8–4–2	4–6–4	—	4–7–3	7–5–2	2–7–5
Montreal	10–2–2	5–5–4	7–4–3	—	11–2–1	8–6
New York	9–3–2	4–7–3	5–7–2	2–11–1	—	2–10–2
Toronto	9–2–3	7–5–2	7–2–5	6–8	10–2–2	—

== Schedule and results ==
1960–61 regular season
October

Game	Result	Date	Score	Opponent	Record
1	L	October 5, 1960	1–2	@ New York Rangers (1960–61)	0–1–0
2	T	October 8, 1960	1–1	@ Montreal Canadiens (1960–61)	0–1–1
3	T	October 9, 1960	4–4	Montreal Canadiens (1960–61)	0–1–2
4	T	October 11, 1960	3–3	Detroit Red Wings (1960–61)	0–1–3
5	T	October 15, 1960	1–1	@ Toronto Maple Leafs (1960–61)	0–1–4
6	L	October 16, 1960	2–5	@ Chicago Black Hawks (1960–61)	0–2–4
7	L	October 20, 1960	0–5	@ Detroit Red Wings (1960–61)	0–3–4
8	T	October 23, 1960	2–2	Chicago Black Hawks (1960–61)	0–3–5
9	W	October 27, 1960	6–4	New York Rangers (1960–61)	1–3–5
10	L	October 29, 1960	2–3	@ Montreal Canadiens (1960–61)	1–4–5
11	W	October 30, 1960	5–3	Montreal Canadiens (1960–61)	2–4–5

November

Game	Result	Date	Score	Opponent	Record
12	T	November 2, 1960	2–2	@ Toronto Maple Leafs (1960–61)	2–4–6
13	L	November 3, 1960	5–8	@ Detroit Red Wings (1960–61)	2–5–6
14	W	November 6, 1960	4–0	Chicago Black Hawks (1960–61)	3–5–6
15	L	November 10, 1960	1–4	Detroit Red Wings (1960–61)	3–6–6
16	L	November 13, 1960	2–4	Toronto Maple Leafs (1960–61)	3–7–6
17	L	November 16, 1960	3–4	@ New York Rangers (1960–61)	3–8–6
18	L	November 17, 1960	2–4	@ Chicago Black Hawks (1960–61)	3–9–6
19	W	November 19, 1960	6–4	Detroit Red Wings (1960–61)	4–9–6
20	L	November 20, 1960	2–3	Toronto Maple Leafs (1960–61)	4–10–6
21	L	November 23, 1960	3–6	@ New York Rangers (1960–61)	4–11–6
22	L	November 24, 1960	3–5	New York Rangers (1960–61)	4–12–6
23	L	November 27, 1960	0–3	Montreal Canadiens (1960–61)	4–13–6
24	T	November 30, 1960	2–2	@ Chicago Black Hawks (1960–61)	4–13–7

December

Game	Result	Date	Score	Opponent	Record
25	W	December 1, 1960	3–2	@ Detroit Red Wings (1960–61)	5–13–7
26	L	December 3, 1960	1–3	@ Montreal Canadiens (1960–61)	5–14–7
27	L	December 4, 1960	2–5	Toronto Maple Leafs (1960–61)	5–15–7
28	W	December 8, 1960	5–1	Chicago Black Hawks (1960–61)	6–15–7
29	L	December 10, 1960	0–3	New York Rangers (1960–61)	6–16–7
30	T	December 11, 1960	2–2	@ New York Rangers (1960–61)	6–16–8
31	T	December 17, 1960	3–3	@ Toronto Maple Leafs (1960–61)	6–16–9
32	L	December 18, 1960	2–4	Montreal Canadiens (1960–61)	6–17–9
33	W	December 22, 1960	4–2	Chicago Black Hawks (1960–61)	7–17–9
34	L	December 25, 1960	1–4	Toronto Maple Leafs (1960–61)	7–18–9
35	L	December 28, 1960	3–4	@ Chicago Black Hawks (1960–61)	7–19–9
36	L	December 31, 1960	1–3	@ Montreal Canadiens (1960–61)	7–20–9

January

Game	Result	Date	Score	Opponent	Record
37	W	January 1, 1961	3–2	Montreal Canadiens (1960–61)	8–20–9
38	L	January 5, 1961	3–4	Chicago Black Hawks (1960–61)	8–21–9
39	L	January 7, 1961	1–4	@ Toronto Maple Leafs (1960–61)	8–22–9
40	L	January 8, 1961	3–5	@ Detroit Red Wings (1960–61)	8–23–9
41	T	January 12, 1961	4–4	New York Rangers (1960–61)	8–23–10
42	L	January 14, 1961	0–4	@ Montreal Canadiens (1960–61)	8–24–10
43	L	January 15, 1961	4–6	Toronto Maple Leafs (1960–61)	8–25–10
44	W	January 19, 1961	4–2	Detroit Red Wings (1960–61)	9–25–10
45	W	January 21, 1961	3–1	@ Toronto Maple Leafs (1960–61)	10–25–10
46	L	January 22, 1961	3–8	@ Chicago Black Hawks (1960–61)	10–26–10
47	L	January 25, 1961	1–2	@ New York Rangers (1960–61)	10–27–10
48	W	January 26, 1961	5–4	Toronto Maple Leafs (1960–61)	11–27–10
49	L	January 29, 1961	1–3	Detroit Red Wings (1960–61)	11–28–10

February

Game	Result	Date	Score	Opponent	Record
50	T	February 2, 1961	2–2	Chicago Black Hawks (1960–61)	11–28–11
51	L	February 4, 1961	1–2	New York Rangers (1960–61)	11–29–11
52	L	February 5, 1961	2–5	@ New York Rangers (1960–61)	11–30–11
53	L	February 9, 1961	1–5	Montreal Canadiens (1960–61)	11–31–11
54	L	February 11, 1961	3–6	@ Toronto Maple Leafs (1960–61)	11–32–11
55	W	February 12, 1961	8–3	New York Rangers (1960–61)	12–32–11
56	L	February 16, 1961	1–9	@ Montreal Canadiens (1960–61)	12–33–11
57	L	February 18, 1961	1–5	@ Detroit Red Wings (1960–61)	12–34–11
58	T	February 19, 1961	2–2	@ Chicago Black Hawks (1960–61)	12–34–12
59	T	February 23, 1961	3–3	@ Detroit Red Wings (1960–61)	12–34–13
60	L	February 26, 1961	2–7	@ Chicago Black Hawks (1960–61)	12–35–13

March

Game	Result	Date	Score	Opponent	Record
61	L	March 1, 1961	1–3	@ New York Rangers (1960–61)	12–36–13
62	W	March 2, 1961	4–2	Detroit Red Wings (1960–61)	13–36–13
63	L	March 5, 1961	1–2	Montreal Canadiens (1960–61)	13–37–13
64	L	March 7, 1961	1–3	@ Detroit Red Wings (1960–61)	13–38–13
65	L	March 9, 1961	2–5	Detroit Red Wings (1960–61)	13–39–13
66	L	March 11, 1961	5–7	@ Montreal Canadiens (1960–61)	13–40–13
67	L	March 12, 1961	0–5	Toronto Maple Leafs (1960–61)	13–41–13
68	W	March 15, 1961	6–2	New York Rangers (1960–61)	14–41–13
69	L	March 18, 1961	2–6	@ Toronto Maple Leafs (1960–61)	14–42–13
70	W	March 19, 1961	4–3	Chicago Black Hawks (1960–61)	15–42–13

Legend: Win (2 points) Loss (0 points) Tie (1 point)

== Player statistics ==
=== Regular season ===
Scoring

Player	Pos	GP	G	A	Pts	PIM
Jerry Toppazzini	RW	67	15	35	50	35
Don McKenney	C	68	26	23	49	22
Charlie Burns	C	62	15	26	41	16
John Bucyk	LW	70	19	20	39	48
Doug Mohns	LW/D	65	12	21	33	63
Bronco Horvath	C	47	15	15	30	15
Vic Stasiuk	LW	46	5	25	30	35
Jim Bartlett	LW	63	15	9	24	95
Leo Boivin	D	57	6	17	23	50
Andre Pronovost	LW	47	11	11	22	30
Leo Labine	RW	40	7	12	19	34
Murray Oliver	C	21	6	10	16	8
Willie O'Ree	W	43	4	10	14	26
Fern Flaman	D	62	2	9	11	59
Dallas Smith	D	70	1	9	10	79
Bob Armstrong	D	54	0	10	10	72
Gerry Ouellette	RW	34	5	4	9	0
Tom McCarthy	LW	24	4	5	9	0
Aut Erickson	D	68	2	6	8	65
Jean-Guy Gendron	LW	13	1	7	8	24
Orval Tessier	C	32	3	4	7	0
Gary Aldcorn	LW	21	2	3	5	12
Dick Meissner	RW	9	0	1	1	2
Billy Carter	C	8	0	0	0	2
Art Chisholm	C/D	3	0	0	0	0
Bruce Gamble	G	52	0	0	0	14
Ted Green	D	1	0	0	0	2
Don Simmons	G	18	0	0	0	6

Goaltending

Player	MIN	GP	W	L	T	GA	GAA	SO
Bruce Gamble	3120	52	12	33	7	193	3.71	0
Don Simmons	1079	18	3	9	6	58	3.23	1
Jerry Toppazzini	1	1	0	0	0	0	0.00	0
Team:	4200	70	15	42	13	251	3.59	1

Note:

Pos = Position;GP = Games played; G = Goals; A = Assists; Pts = Points; PIM = Penalty minutes; +/- = Plus/minus; PPG = Power-play goals; SHG = Short-handed goals; GWG = Game-winning goals
Pos = Position;GP = Games played; Min, TOI = Minutes played; W = Wins; L = Losses; T,T/OT = Ties; OTL = Overtime losses; GA = Goals-against; GAA = Goals-against average; SO = Shutouts; SA = Shots against; SV = Shots saved;SV% = Save percentage;

== See also ==
- 1960–61 NHL season
