= 1960–61 Montreal Canadiens season =

NHL hockey team season

1960–61 Montreal Canadiens
- Prince of Wales Trophy winners
- League: 1st NHL
- 1960–61 record: 41–19–10
- Home record: 24–6–5
- Road record: 17–13–5
- Goals for: 254
- Goals against: 188

Team information
- General manager: Frank J. Selke
- Coach: Toe Blake
- Captain: Doug Harvey
- Arena: Montreal Forum

Team leaders
- Goals: Bernard Geoffrion (50)
- Assists: Jean Beliveau (58)
- Points: Bernard Geoffrion (95)
- Penalty minutes: Jean-Guy Talbot (143)
- Wins: Jacques Plante (23)
- Goals against average: Charlie Hodge (2.47)

The 1960–61 Montreal Canadiens season was the 52nd season in club history. The team placed first in the regular season to qualify for the playoffs. The Canadiens were eliminated in semi-finals by the Chicago Black Hawks 4 games to 2.

== Regular season ==
=== Final standings ===
National Hockey League
		GP	W	L	T	GF	GA	DIFF	Pts
1	Montreal Canadiens	70	41	19	10	254	188	+66	92
2	Toronto Maple Leafs	70	39	19	12	234	176	+58	90
3	Chicago Black Hawks	70	29	24	17	198	180	+18	75
4	Detroit Red Wings	70	25	29	16	195	215	−20	66
5	New York Rangers	70	22	38	10	204	248	−44	54
6	Boston Bruins	70	15	42	13	176	254	−78	43

=== Record vs. opponents ===
1960–61 NHL Records
Team	BOS	CHI	DET	MTL	NYR	TOR
Boston	—	4–6–4	4–8–2	2–10–2	3–9–2	2–9–3
Chicago	6–4–4	—	6–4–4	5–5–4	7–4–3	5–7–2
Detroit	8–4–2	4–6–4	—	4–7–3	7–5–2	2–7–5
Montreal	10–2–2	5–5–4	7–4–3	—	11–2–1	8–6
New York	9–3–2	4–7–3	5–7–2	2–11–1	—	2–10–2
Toronto	9–2–3	7–5–2	7–2–5	6–8	10–2–2	—

== Schedule and results ==
1960–61 regular season
October

Game	Result	Date	Score	Opponent	Record
1	W	October 6, 1960	5–0	Toronto Maple Leafs (1960–61)	1–0–0
2	T	October 8, 1960	1–1	Boston Bruins (1960–61)	1–0–1
3	T	October 9, 1960	4–4	@ Boston Bruins (1960–61)	1–0–2
4	W	October 11, 1960	3–2	@ New York Rangers (1960–61)	2–0–2
5	W	October 13, 1960	4–3	Detroit Red Wings (1960–61)	3–0–2
6	W	October 15, 1960	8–4	New York Rangers (1960–61)	4–0–2
7	L	October 16, 1960	4–6	@ Detroit Red Wings (1960–61)	4–1–2
8	L	October 19, 1960	1–3	@ Toronto Maple Leafs (1960–61)	4–2–2
9	L	October 22, 1960	2–4	Chicago Black Hawks (1960–61)	4–3–2
10	W	October 23, 1960	4–2	@ New York Rangers (1960–61)	5–3–2
11	L	October 25, 1960	4–8	@ Chicago Black Hawks (1960–61)	5–4–2
12	W	October 29, 1960	3–2	Boston Bruins (1960–61)	6–4–2
13	L	October 30, 1960	3–5	@ Boston Bruins (1960–61)	6–5–2

November

Game	Result	Date	Score	Opponent	Record
14	W	November 3, 1960	3–1	Toronto Maple Leafs (1960–61)	7–5–2
15	T	November 5, 1960	4–4	Chicago Black Hawks (1960–61)	7–5–3
16	W	November 10, 1960	9–7	New York Rangers (1960–61)	8–5–3
17	W	November 12, 1960	4–2	Detroit Red Wings (1960–61)	9–5–3
18	W	November 13, 1960	2–1	@ New York Rangers (1960–61)	10–5–3
19	L	November 19, 1960	3–6	@ Toronto Maple Leafs (1960–61)	10–6–3
20	T	November 20, 1960	1–1	@ Chicago Black Hawks (1960–61)	10–6–4
21	L	November 24, 1960	1–3	@ Detroit Red Wings (1960–61)	10–7–4
22	W	November 26, 1960	4–2	Chicago Black Hawks (1960–61)	11–7–4
23	W	November 27, 1960	3–0	@ Boston Bruins (1960–61)	12–7–4

December

Game	Result	Date	Score	Opponent	Record
24	W	December 1, 1960	6–3	Toronto Maple Leafs (1960–61)	13–7–4
25	W	December 3, 1960	3–1	Boston Bruins (1960–61)	14–7–4
26	W	December 4, 1960	7–5	@ Chicago Black Hawks (1960–61)	15–7–4
27	W	December 7, 1960	6–2	@ Toronto Maple Leafs (1960–61)	16–7–4
28	W	December 10, 1960	6–4	Detroit Red Wings (1960–61)	17–7–4
29	W	December 11, 1960	5–1	@ Detroit Red Wings (1960–61)	18–7–4
30	L	December 15, 1960	2–4	Toronto Maple Leafs (1960–61)	18–8–4
31	W	December 17, 1960	2–0	New York Rangers (1960–61)	19–8–4
32	W	December 18, 1960	4–2	@ Boston Bruins (1960–61)	20–8–4
33	W	December 24, 1960	3–1	Chicago Black Hawks (1960–61)	21–8–4
34	L	December 25, 1960	1–4	@ New York Rangers (1960–61)	21–9–4
35	W	December 28, 1960	4–1	@ Toronto Maple Leafs (1960–61)	22–9–4
36	T	December 29, 1960	1–1	Detroit Red Wings (1960–61)	22–9–5
37	W	December 31, 1960	3–1	Boston Bruins (1960–61)	23–9–5

January

Game	Result	Date	Score	Opponent	Record
38	L	January 1, 1961	2–3	@ Boston Bruins (1960–61)	23–10–5
39	W	January 7, 1961	6–3	New York Rangers (1960–61)	24–10–5
40	L	January 8, 1961	2–4	@ New York Rangers (1960–61)	24–11–5
41	W	January 12, 1961	6–2	Toronto Maple Leafs (1960–61)	25–11–5
42	W	January 14, 1961	4–0	Boston Bruins (1960–61)	26–11–5
43	T	January 15, 1961	4–4	@ Detroit Red Wings (1960–61)	26–11–6
44	W	January 18, 1961	4–0	@ Chicago Black Hawks (1960–61)	27–11–6
45	L	January 21, 1961	2–3	Detroit Red Wings (1960–61)	27–12–6
46	L	January 25, 1961	3–5	@ Toronto Maple Leafs (1960–61)	27–13–6
47	T	January 28, 1961	3–3	Detroit Red Wings (1960–61)	27–13–7
48	T	January 29, 1961	1–1	@ Chicago Black Hawks (1960–61)	27–13–8

February

Game	Result	Date	Score	Opponent	Record
49	W	February 2, 1961	7–5	New York Rangers (1960–61)	28–13–8
50	L	February 4, 1961	1–4	Chicago Black Hawks (1960–61)	28–14–8
51	L	February 5, 1961	2–7	@ Detroit Red Wings (1960–61)	28–15–8
52	W	February 9, 1961	5–1	@ Boston Bruins (1960–61)	29–15–8
53	T	February 11, 1961	3–3	@ New York Rangers (1960–61)	29–15–9
54	L	February 12, 1961	1–3	@ Chicago Black Hawks (1960–61)	29–16–9
55	W	February 15, 1961	3–1	@ Toronto Maple Leafs (1960–61)	30–16–9
56	W	February 16, 1961	9–1	Boston Bruins (1960–61)	31–16–9
57	W	February 18, 1961	7–4	New York Rangers (1960–61)	32–16–9
58	W	February 19, 1961	4–2	@ Detroit Red Wings (1960–61)	33–16–9
59	L	February 23, 1961	2–4	Toronto Maple Leafs (1960–61)	33–17–9
60	T	February 25, 1961	1–1	Chicago Black Hawks (1960–61)	33–17–10
61	W	February 26, 1961	3–1	@ New York Rangers (1960–61)	34–17–10

March

Game	Result	Date	Score	Opponent	Record
62	L	March 1, 1961	1–3	@ Toronto Maple Leafs (1960–61)	34–18–10
63	W	March 4, 1961	6–4	Detroit Red Wings (1960–61)	35–18–10
64	W	March 5, 1961	2–1	@ Boston Bruins (1960–61)	36–18–10
65	W	March 9, 1961	6–1	New York Rangers (1960–61)	37–18–10
66	W	March 11, 1961	7–5	Boston Bruins (1960–61)	38–18–10
67	W	March 12, 1961	6–2	@ Chicago Black Hawks (1960–61)	39–18–10
68	W	March 16, 1961	5–2	Toronto Maple Leafs (1960–61)	40–18–10
69	L	March 18, 1961	1–4	Chicago Black Hawks (1960–61)	40–19–10
70	W	March 19, 1961	2–0	@ Detroit Red Wings (1960–61)	41–19–10

Legend: Win (2 points) Loss (0 points) Tie (1 point)

== Player statistics ==
=== Regular season ===
==== Scoring ====
Player	Pos	GP	G	A	Pts	PIM
Bernie Geoffrion	RW	64	50	45	95	29
Jean Beliveau	C	69	32	58	90	57
Dickie Moore	LW	57	35	34	69	62
Henri Richard	C	70	24	44	68	91
Marcel Bonin	W	65	16	35	51	45
Bill Hicke	RW	70	18	27	45	31
Doug Harvey	D	58	6	33	39	48
Ralph Backstrom	C	69	12	20	32	44
Donnie Marshall	LW	70	14	17	31	8
Jean-Guy Talbot	D	70	5	26	31	143
Jean-Guy Gendron	LW	53	9	12	21	51
Gilles Tremblay	LW	45	7	11	18	4
Tom Johnson	D	70	1	15	16	54
Claude Provost	RW	49	11	4	15	32
Albert Langlois	D	61	1	12	13	56
Phil Goyette	C	62	7	4	11	4
Andre Pronovost	LW	21	1	5	6	4
Bob Turner	D	60	2	2	4	16
J.C. Tremblay	D	29	1	3	4	18
Bobby Rousseau	RW	15	1	2	3	4
Cliff Pennington	C	4	1	0	1	0
Jean Gauthier	D	4	0	1	1	8
Wayne Connelly	C	3	0	0	0	0
Charlie Hodge	G	30	0	0	0	0
Jacques Plante	G	40	0	0	0	2
Glen Skov	C/LW	3	0	0	0	0

==== Goaltending ====
Player	MIN	GP	W	L	T	GA	GAA	SO
Jacques Plante	2400	40	23	11	6	112	2.80	2
Charlie Hodge	1800	30	18	8	4	74	2.47	4
Team:	4200	70	41	19	10	186	2.66	6

=== Playoffs ===
==== Scoring ====
Player	Pos	GP	G	A	Pts	PIM
Phil Goyette	C	6	3	3	6	0
Henri Richard	C	6	2	4	6	22
Jean Beliveau	C	6	0	5	5	0
Dickie Moore	LW	6	3	1	4	4
Claude Provost	RW	6	1	3	4	4
Gilles Tremblay	LW	6	1	3	4	0
Bernie Geoffrion	RW	4	2	1	3	0
Bill Hicke	RW	5	2	0	2	19
Jean-Guy Talbot	D	6	1	1	2	10
Donnie Marshall	LW	6	0	2	2	0
Marcel Bonin	W	6	0	1	1	29
Doug Harvey	D	6	0	1	1	8
Tom Johnson	D	6	0	1	1	8
Ralph Backstrom	C	5	0	0	0	4
Jean-Guy Gendron	LW	5	0	0	0	2
Albert Langlois	D	5	0	0	0	6
Jacques Plante	G	6	0	0	0	2
J.C. Tremblay	D	5	0	0	0	2
Bob Turner	D	5	0	0	0	0

==== Goaltending ====
Player	MIN	GP	W	L	GA	GAA	SO
Jacques Plante	412	6	2	4	16	2.33	0
Team:	412	6	2	4	16	2.33	0

Note:

Pos = Position;GP = Games played; G = Goals; A = Assists; Pts = Points; PIM = Penalty minutes; +/- = Plus/minus; PPG = Power-play goals; SHG = Short-handed goals; GWG = Game-winning goals
Pos = Position;GP = Games played; Min, TOI = Minutes played; W = Wins; L = Losses; T,T/OT = Ties; OTL = Overtime losses; GA = Goals-against; GAA = Goals-against average; SO = Shutouts; SA = Shots against; SV = Shots saved;SV% = Save percentage;

== Awards and records ==
- Hart Memorial Trophy: Bernard Geoffrion
- Art Ross Trophy: Bernard Geoffrion
- James Norris Memorial Trophy: Doug Harvey

== See also ==
- 1960–61 NHL season
