= 1960–61 Chicago Black Hawks season =

NHL ice hockey team season (won Stanley Cup)

1960–61 Chicago Black Hawks
- Stanley Cup champions
- League: 3rd NHL
- 1960–61 record: 29–24–17
- Home record: 20–6–9
- Road record: 9–18–8
- Goals for: 198
- Goals against: 180

Team information
- General manager: Tommy Ivan
- Coach: Rudy Pilous
- Captain: Ed Litzenberger
- Alternate captains: Bill Hay; Ron Murphy; Pierre Pilote
- Arena: Chicago Stadium

Team leaders
- Goals: Bobby Hull (31)
- Assists: Bill Hay (48)
- Points: Bill Hay (59)
- Penalty minutes: Pierre Pilote (165)
- Wins: Glenn Hall (29)
- Goals against average: Glenn Hall (2.51)

The 1960–61 Chicago Black Hawks season was the Hawks' 35th season in the National Hockey League (NHL), ending with the Hawks winning their third Stanley Cup. Chicago faced the Montreal Canadiens in the NHL semi-finals, and defeated the Canadiens in six games to reach their first Stanley Cup Finals in 17 years. They subsequently faced the Detroit Red Wings in the Stanley Cup Finals, winning in six games. However, it would be their last Stanley Cup championship for 49 years.

== Regular season ==
The Black Hawks started the year off very strong, earning a 6–1–2 record in their first nine games; however, the club went into a slump in which their record was 5–13–6 in their next 24 games, causing them to fall under the .500 mark and into a battle with the Detroit Red Wings and New York Rangers for a playoff spot. Chicago would snap out of their slump, and go on a seven-game winning streak to sit with an 18–14–8 record, 40 games into the season. The Hawks continued to play good hockey for the remainder of the season, going 11–10–9 in their last 30 games to finish the season with a club-record 29 victories and 75 points. The Hawks finished in third place for the third consecutive season, and for the first time since 1945–46 the club finished the season with a record over .500.

Offensively, Chicago was led by Bill Hay, who led the team with 48 assists and 59 points, while Bobby Hull scored a team-high 31 goals. Stan Mikita had a break out season, scoring 19 goals and 53 points, as did Murray Balfour, who had 21 goals and 48 points. On defense, Pierre Pilote led the way, scoring 6 goals and 35 points while posting a team-high 165 penalty minutes.

In goal, Glenn Hall played in all 70 games, winning a team-record 29 games, while posting a 2.51 GAA and 6 shutouts.

=== Season standings ===
National Hockey League
		GP	W	L	T	GF	GA	DIFF	Pts
1	Montreal Canadiens	70	41	19	10	254	188	+66	92
2	Toronto Maple Leafs	70	39	19	12	234	176	+58	90
3	Chicago Black Hawks	70	29	24	17	198	180	+18	75
4	Detroit Red Wings	70	25	29	16	195	215	−20	66
5	New York Rangers	70	22	38	10	204	248	−44	54
6	Boston Bruins	70	15	42	13	176	254	−78	43

=== Record vs. opponents ===
1960–61 NHL Records
Team	BOS	CHI	DET	MTL	NYR	TOR
Boston	—	4–6–4	4–8–2	2–10–2	3–9–2	2–9–3
Chicago	6–4–4	—	6–4–4	5–5–4	7–4–3	5–7–2
Detroit	8–4–2	4–6–4	—	4–7–3	7–5–2	2–7–5
Montreal	10–2–2	5–5–4	7–4–3	—	11–2–1	8–6
New York	9–3–2	4–7–3	5–7–2	2–11–1	—	2–10–2
Toronto	9–2–3	7–5–2	7–2–5	6–8	10–2–2	—

== Schedule and results ==
1960–61 regular season
October

Game	Date	Visitor	Score	Home	Record	Points
1	October 5	Detroit Red Wings	1–1	Chicago Black Hawks	0–0–1	1
2	October 6	Chicago Black Hawks	4–2	Detroit Red Wings	1–0–1	3
3	October 9	New York Rangers	2–3	Chicago Black Hawks	2–0–1	5
4	October 12	Toronto Maple Leafs	0–3	Chicago Black Hawks	3–0–1	7
5	October 16	Boston Bruins	2–5	Chicago Black Hawks	4–0–1	9
6	October 19	Chicago Black Hawks	0–2	New York Rangers	4–1–1	9
7	October 22	Chicago Black Hawks	4–2	Montreal Canadiens	5–1–1	11
8	October 23	Chicago Black Hawks	2–2	Boston Bruins	5–1–2	12
9	October 25	Montreal Canadiens	4–8	Chicago Black Hawks	6–1–2	14
10	October 29	Chicago Black Hawks	4–8	Toronto Maple Leafs	6–2–2	14
11	October 30	Chicago Black Hawks	1–2	Detroit Red Wings	6–3–2	14

November

Game	Date	Visitor	Score	Home	Record	Points
12	November 2	New York Rangers	4–4	Chicago Black Hawks	6–3–3	15
13	November 5	Chicago Black Hawks	4–4	Montreal Canadiens	6–3–4	16
14	November 6	Chicago Black Hawks	0–4	Boston Bruins	6–4–4	16
15	November 9	Toronto Maple Leafs	0–2	Chicago Black Hawks	7–4–4	18
16	November 12	Chicago Black Hawks	1–7	Toronto Maple Leafs	7–5–4	18
17	November 13	Detroit Red Wings	1–7	Chicago Black Hawks	8–5–4	20
18	November 15	Chicago Black Hawks	2–3	Detroit Red Wings	8–6–4	20
19	November 17	Boston Bruins	2–4	Chicago Black Hawks	9–6–4	22
20	November 20	Montreal Canadiens	1–1	Chicago Black Hawks	9–6–5	23
21	November 24	Toronto Maple Leafs	1–2	Chicago Black Hawks	10–6–5	25
22	November 26	Chicago Black Hawks	2–4	Montreal Canadiens	10–7–5	25
23	November 27	Chicago Black Hawks	3–3	New York Rangers	10–7–6	26
24	November 30	Boston Bruins	2–2	Chicago Black Hawks	10–7–7	27

December

Game	Date	Visitor	Score	Home	Record	Points
25	December 4	Montreal Canadiens	7–5	Chicago Black Hawks	10–8–7	27
26	December 8	Chicago Black Hawks	1–5	Boston Bruins	10–9–7	27
27	December 10	Chicago Black Hawks	2–5	Toronto Maple Leafs	10–10–7	27
28	December 11	Toronto Maple Leafs	6–1	Chicago Black Hawks	10–11–7	27
29	December 14	New York Rangers	0–4	Chicago Black Hawks	11–11–7	29
30	December 18	Detroit Red Wings	3–2	Chicago Black Hawks	11–12–7	29
31	December 21	Chicago Black Hawks	2–2	New York Rangers	11–12–8	30
32	December 22	Chicago Black Hawks	2–4	Boston Bruins	11–13–8	30
33	December 24	Chicago Black Hawks	1–3	Montreal Canadiens	11–14–8	30
34	December 25	Chicago Black Hawks	3–0	Detroit Red Wings	12–14–8	32
35	December 28	Boston Bruins	3–4	Chicago Black Hawks	13–14–8	34
36	December 31	Chicago Black Hawks	3–0	Detroit Red Wings	14–14–8	36

January

Game	Date	Visitor	Score	Home	Record	Points
37	January 1	Detroit Red Wings	0–3	Chicago Black Hawks	15–14–8	38
38	January 4	Chicago Black Hawks	3–2	Detroit Red Wings	16–14–8	40
39	January 5	Chicago Black Hawks	4–3	Boston Bruins	17–14–8	42
40	January 8	Toronto Maple Leafs	1–5	Chicago Black Hawks	18–14–8	44
41	January 11	Detroit Red Wings	2–2	Chicago Black Hawks	18–14–9	45
42	January 14	Chicago Black Hawks	1–4	Toronto Maple Leafs	18–15–9	45
43	January 15	New York Rangers	3–1	Chicago Black Hawks	18–16–9	45
44	January 18	Montreal Canadiens	4–0	Chicago Black Hawks	18–17–9	45
45	January 21	New York Rangers	3–5	Chicago Black Hawks	19–17–9	47
46	January 22	Boston Bruins	3–8	Chicago Black Hawks	20–17–9	49
47	January 26	Chicago Black Hawks	2–2	Detroit Red Wings	20–17–10	50
48	January 28	Chicago Black Hawks	1–2	Toronto Maple Leafs	20–18–10	50
49	January 29	Montreal Canadiens	1–1	Chicago Black Hawks	20–18–11	51

February

Game	Date	Visitor	Score	Home	Record	Points
50	February 1	Chicago Black Hawks	1–3	New York Rangers	20–19–11	51
51	February 2	Chicago Black Hawks	2–2	Boston Bruins	20–19–12	52
52	February 4	Chicago Black Hawks	4–1	Montreal Canadiens	21–19–12	54
53	February 5	Toronto Maple Leafs	1–1	Chicago Black Hawks	21–19–13	55
54	February 8	Detroit Red Wings	2–5	Chicago Black Hawks	22–19–13	57
55	February 12	Montreal Canadiens	1–3	Chicago Black Hawks	23–19–13	59
56	February 15	New York Rangers	2–5	Chicago Black Hawks	24–19–13	61
57	February 18	Chicago Black Hawks	2–5	Toronto Maple Leafs	24–20–13	61
58	February 19	Chicago Black Hawks	2–2	Boston Bruins	24–20–14	62
59	February 22	Chicago Black Hawks	2–4	New York Rangers	24–21–14	62
60	February 25	Chicago Black Hawks	1–1	Montreal Canadiens	24–21–15	63
61	February 26	Boston Bruins	2–7	Chicago Black Hawks	25–21–15	65
62	February 28	Chicago Black Hawks	1–3	Detroit Red Wings	25–22–15	65

March

Game	Date	Visitor	Score	Home	Record	Points
63	March 2	New York Rangers	1–7	Chicago Black Hawks	26–22–15	67
64	March 5	Toronto Maple Leafs	1–3	Chicago Black Hawks	27–22–15	69
65	March 8	Chicago Black Hawks	4–3	New York Rangers	28–22–15	71
66	March 11	Chicago Black Hawks	2–2	Toronto Maple Leafs	28–22–16	72
67	March 12	Montreal Canadiens	6–2	Chicago Black Hawks	28–23–16	72
68	March 15	Detroit Red Wings	2–2	Chicago Black Hawks	28–23–17	73
69	March 18	Chicago Black Hawks	4–1	Montreal Canadiens	29–23–17	75
70	March 19	Chicago Black Hawks	3–4	Boston Bruins	29–24–17	75

Legend: Win (2 points) Loss (0 points) Tie (1 point)

== Playoffs ==
Chicago faced the Montreal Canadiens in the best-of-seven NHL semi-final for the third consecutive season. The Canadiens once again finished on top of the NHL, earning 92 points, and had won five straight Stanley Cup championships. The heavily favored Canadiens took the series opener at the Montreal Forum, easily defeating Chicago 6–2; however, the Black Hawks fought back in the second game, evening the series out with a 4–3 win. The series moved to Chicago Stadium for the next two games, and the Black Hawks used their home ice advantage to take a 2–1 series lead with a thrilling 2–1 overtime victory in the third game; however, the powerful Canadiens stormed back in the fourth game, defeating Chicago 5–2 to even the series up once again. The Black Hawks stunned the Montreal fans in the fifth game, shutting out the Canadiens 3–0 on the road to return to Chicago for the sixth game up 3–2 in the series. Chicago completed the upset, once again shutting out the Canadiens 3–0 in the sixth game to win the series 4–2, and earned a trip to the Stanley Cup finals for the first time since 1944.

The Black Hawks faced the Detroit Red Wings in the 1961 Stanley Cup Finals. The Red Wings finished the season behind Chicago in the regular season, earning 66 points; however, they upset the heavily favored Toronto Maple Leafs to earn a spot in the finals. The Hawks took the series opener on home ice, as Bobby Hull scored two goals in Chicago's 3–2 win. The series moved to the Detroit Olympia for the second game, and the Red Wings responded with a 3–1 win to even the series up. The third game was back in Chicago, and it was the Hawks who took a 2–1 series lead by defeating the Red Wings 3–1; however, in the fourth game back in Detroit, the Red Wings evened the series up again, defeating the Hawks 2–1. Chicago easily won the fifth game in Chicago, winning 6–3 to take the series lead once again. In the sixth game in Detroit, the Black Hawks won the series as they handily defeated the Wings 5–1 to win their third Stanley Cup in team history, and the first since 1938. Pierre Pilote led all players in playoff scoring, earning 15 points, while Bobby Hull was just behind him with 14 points.

1961 Stanley Cup playoffs
Semifinals vs. (1) Montreal Canadiens – Black Hawks win 4–2

Game	Date	Visitor	Score	Home	Series
1	March 21	Chicago Black Hawks	2–6	Montreal Canadiens	0–1
2	March 23	Chicago Black Hawks	4–3	Montreal Canadiens	1–1
3	March 26	Montreal Canadiens	1–2	Chicago Black Hawks	2–1
4	March 28	Montreal Canadiens	5–2	Chicago Black Hawks	2–2
5	April 1	Chicago Black Hawks	3–0	Montreal Canadiens	3–2
6	April 4	Montreal Canadiens	0–3	Chicago Black Hawks	4–2

Stanley Cup Finals vs. (4) Detroit Red Wings – Black Hawks win 4–2

Game	Date	Visitor	Score	Home	Series
1	April 6	Detroit Red Wings	2–3	Chicago Black Hawks	1–0
2	April 8	Chicago Black Hawks	1–3	Detroit Red Wings	1–1
3	April 10	Detroit Red Wings	1–3	Chicago Black Hawks	2–1
4	April 12	Chicago Black Hawks	1–2	Detroit Red Wings	2–2
5	April 14	Detroit Red Wings	3–6	Chicago Black Hawks	3–2
6	April 16	Chicago Black Hawks	5–1	Detroit Red Wings	4–2

Legend: Win Loss

== Player statistics ==
=== Regular season ===
Scoring leaders

Player	GP	G	A	Pts	PIM
Bill Hay	69	11	48	59	45
Bobby Hull	67	31	25	56	43
Stan Mikita	66	19	34	53	100
Murray Balfour	70	21	27	48	123
Kenny Wharram	64	16	29	45	12

Goaltending

Player	GP	TOI	W	L	T	GA	SO	GAA
Glenn Hall	70	4200	29	24	17	176	6	2.51

=== Playoffs ===
Scoring leaders

Player	GP	G	A	Pts	PIM
Pierre Pilote	12	3	12	15	8
Bobby Hull	12	4	10	14	4
Stan Mikita	12	6	5	11	21
Murray Balfour	11	5	5	10	14
Kenny Wharram	12	3	5	8	12

Goaltending

Player	GP	TOI	W	L	GA	SO	GAA
Glenn Hall	12	772	8	4	26	2	2.02

== See also ==
- 1960–61 NHL season

== Sources ==
- Hockey-Reference
- Rauzulu's Street
- Goalies Archive
- National Hockey League Guide & Record Book 2007
