= 1960–61 New York Rangers season =

NHL hockey team season

1960–61 New York Rangers
- League: 5th NHL
- 1960–61 record: 22–38–10
- Home record: 15–15–5
- Road record: 7–23–5
- Goals for: 204
- Goals against: 248

Team information
- General manager: Muzz Patrick
- Coach: Alf Pike
- Captain: George Sullivan
- Alternate captains: Camille Henry
- Arena: Madison Square Garden

Team leaders
- Goals: Andy Bathgate (29)
- Assists: Andy Bathgate (48)
- Points: Andy Bathgate (77)
- Penalty minutes: Lou Fontinato (100)
- Wins: Gump Worsley (20)
- Goals against average: Gump Worsley (3.28)

The 1960–61 New York Rangers season was the franchise's 35th season. The Rangers finished in fifth place in the regular season with 54 points, and did not qualify for the NHL playoffs for the third year in a row for the first time since the 1952–53 to 1954–55 seasons.

== Regular season ==
=== Final standings ===
National Hockey League
		GP	W	L	T	GF	GA	DIFF	Pts
1	Montreal Canadiens	70	41	19	10	254	188	+66	92
2	Toronto Maple Leafs	70	39	19	12	234	176	+58	90
3	Chicago Black Hawks	70	29	24	17	198	180	+18	75
4	Detroit Red Wings	70	25	29	16	195	215	−20	66
5	New York Rangers	70	22	38	10	204	248	−44	54
6	Boston Bruins	70	15	42	13	176	254	−78	43

=== Record vs. opponents ===
1960–61 NHL Records
Team	BOS	CHI	DET	MTL	NYR	TOR
Boston	—	4–6–4	4–8–2	2–10–2	3–9–2	2–9–3
Chicago	6–4–4	—	6–4–4	5–5–4	7–4–3	5–7–2
Detroit	8–4–2	4–6–4	—	4–7–3	7–5–2	2–7–5
Montreal	10–2–2	5–5–4	7–4–3	—	11–2–1	8–6
New York	9–3–2	4–7–3	5–7–2	2–11–1	—	2–10–2
Toronto	9–2–3	7–5–2	7–2–5	6–8	10–2–2	—

== Schedule and results ==
1960–61 regular season
October: 4–7–0 (home: 3–4–0; road: 1–3–0)

Game	October	Opponent	Score	Record
1	5	Boston Bruins	2–1	1–0–0
2	8	@ Toronto Maple Leafs	5–2	2–0–0
3	9	@ Chicago Black Hawks	3–2	2–1–0
4	11	Montreal Canadiens	3–2	2–2–0
5	15	@ Montreal Canadiens	8–4	2–3–0
6	16	Toronto Maple Leafs	7–2	2–4–0
7	19	Chicago Black Hawks	2–0	3–4–0
8	23	Montreal Canadiens	4–2	3–5–0
9	26	Detroit Red Wings	4–3	4–5–0
10	27	@ Boston Bruins	6–4	4–6–0
11	30	Toronto Maple Leafs	3–1	4–7–0

November: 3–6–2 (home: 2–3–1; road: 1–3–1)

Game	November	Opponent	Score	Record
12	2	@ Chicago Black Hawks	4–4	4–7–1
13	5	@ Toronto Maple Leafs	7–3	4–8–1
14	6	@ Detroit Red Wings	5–2	4–9–1
15	9	Detroit Red Wings	4–3	4–10–1
16	10	@ Montreal Canadiens	9–7	4–11–1
17	13	Montreal Canadiens	2–1	4–12–1
18	16	Boston Bruins	4–3	5–12–1
19	20	Detroit Red Wings	4–3	5–13–1
20	23	Boston Bruins	6–3	6–13–1
21	24	@ Boston Bruins	5–3	7–13–1
22	27	Chicago Black Hawks	3–3	7–13–2

December: 3–7–3 (home: 1–3–2; road: 2–4–1)

Game	December	Opponent	Score	Record
23	3	@ Toronto Maple Leafs	5–2	7–14–2
24	4	@ Detroit Red Wings	4–1	8–14–2
25	7	Detroit Red Wings	3–1	8–15–2
26	10	@ Boston Bruins	3–0	9–15–2
27	11	Boston Bruins	2–2	9–15–3
28	14	@ Chicago Black Hawks	4–0	9–16–3
29	15	@ Detroit Red Wings	1–1	9–16–4
30	17	@ Montreal Canadiens	2–0	9–17–4
31	18	Toronto Maple Leafs	3–2	9–18–4
32	21	Chicago Black Hawks	2–2	9–18–5
33	25	Montreal Canadiens	4–1	10–18–5
34	28	Detroit Red Wings	4–3	10–19–5
35	31	@ Toronto Maple Leafs	2–1	10–20–5

January: 4–5–3 (home: 2–3–0; road: 2–2–3)

Game	January	Opponent	Score	Record
36	1	Toronto Maple Leafs	4–1	10–21–5
37	4	Chicago Black Hawks	3–2	10–22–5
38	7	@ Montreal Canadiens	6–3	10–23–5
39	8	Montreal Canadiens	4–2	11–23–5
40	12	@ Boston Bruins	4–4	11–23–6
41	14	@ Detroit Red Wings	2–2	11–23–7
42	15	@ Chicago Black Hawks	3–1	12–23–7
43	18	@ Toronto Maple Leafs	4–4	12–23–8
44	21	@ Chicago Black Hawks	5–3	12–24–8
45	22	@ Detroit Red Wings	5–3	13–24–8
46	25	Boston Bruins	2–1	14–24–8
47	29	Toronto Maple Leafs	4–1	14–25–8

February: 5–7–1 (home: 4–1–1; road: 1–6–0)

Game	February	Opponent	Score	Record
48	1	Chicago Black Hawks	3–1	15–25–8
49	2	@ Montreal Canadiens	7–5	15–26–8
50	4	@ Boston Bruins	2–1	16–26–8
51	5	Boston Bruins	5–2	17–26–8
52	8	@ Toronto Maple Leafs	5–3	17–27–8
53	9	@ Detroit Red Wings	4–2	17–28–8
54	11	Montreal Canadiens	3–3	17–28–9
55	12	@ Boston Bruins	8–3	17–29–9
56	15	@ Chicago Black Hawks	5–2	17–30–9
57	18	@ Montreal Canadiens	7–4	17–31–9
58	19	Toronto Maple Leafs	4–2	18–31–9
59	22	Chicago Black Hawks	4–2	19–31–9
60	26	Montreal Canadiens	3–1	19–32–9

March: 3–6–1 (home: 3–1–1; road: 0–5–0)

Game	March	Opponent	Score	Record
61	1	Boston Bruins	3–1	20–32–9
62	2	@ Chicago Black Hawks	7–1	20–33–9
63	4	@ Toronto Maple Leafs	5–4	20–34–9
64	5	Detroit Red Wings	8–3	21–34–9
65	8	Chicago Black Hawks	4–3	21–35–9
66	9	@ Montreal Canadiens	6–1	21–36–9
67	12	Detroit Red Wings	7–3	22–36–9
68	14	@ Detroit Red Wings	5–2	22–37–9
69	15	@ Boston Bruins	6–2	22–38–9
70	19	Toronto Maple Leafs	2–2	22–38–10

Legend: Win (2 points) Loss (0 points) Tie (1 point)

== Player statistics ==
Skaters

Regular season
Player	GP	G	A	Pts	PIM
Andy Bathgate	70	29	48	77	22
Andy Hebenton	70	26	28	54	10
Camille Henry	53	28	25	53	8
Dean Prentice	56	20	25	45	17
George Sullivan	70	9	31	40	66
Bill Gadsby	65	9	26	35	49
Earl Ingarfield	66	13	21	34	18
Brian Cullen	42	11	19	30	6
Johnny Wilson^{†}	56	14	12	26	24
Pat Hannigan	53	11	9	20	24
Ted Hampson	69	6	14	20	4
Harry Howell	70	7	10	17	62
Floyd Smith	29	5	9	14	0
John Hanna	46	1	8	9	34
Irv Spencer	56	1	8	9	30
Ken Schinkel	38	2	6	8	18
Don Johns	63	1	7	8	34
Jim Morrison	19	1	6	7	6
Orland Kurtenbach	10	0	6	6	2
Lou Fontinato	53	2	3	5	100
Jean Ratelle	3	2	1	3	0
Len Ronson	13	2	1	3	10
Eddie Shack^{‡}	12	1	2	3	17
Dave Balon	13	1	2	3	8
Dan Belisle	4	2	0	2	0
Robert Kabel	4	0	2	2	2
Al LeBrun	4	0	2	2	4
Rod Gilbert	1	0	1	1	2
Bob Cunningham	3	0	1	1	0
Larry Popein	4	0	1	1	0
Leon Rochefort	1	0	0	0	0
Noel Price	1	0	0	0	2
Wayne Hall	4	0	0	0	0
Phil Latreille	4	0	0	0	2
Ron Hutchinson	9	0	0	0	0

Goaltenders

Regular season
Player	GP	TOI	W	L	T	GA	GAA	SA	SV%	SO
Lorne Worsley	59	3473	20	29	8	191	3.30	2161	.912	1
Jack McCartan	8	440	1	6	1	35	4.77	238	.853	1
Marcel Paille	4	240	1	2	1	16	4.00	153	.895	0
Joe Schaefer	1	47	0	1	0	3	3.83	30	.900	0

^{†}Denotes player spent time with another team before joining Rangers. Stats reflect time with Rangers only.
^{‡}Traded mid-season. Stats reflect time with Rangers only.

Note:

Pos = Position;GP = Games played; G = Goals; A = Assists; Pts = Points; PIM = Penalty minutes; +/- = Plus/minus; PPG = Power-play goals; SHG = Short-handed goals; GWG = Game-winning goals
Pos = Position;GP = Games played; Min, TOI = Minutes played; W = Wins; L = Losses; T,T/OT = Ties; OTL = Overtime losses; GA = Goals-against; GAA = Goals-against average; SO = Shutouts; SA = Shots against; SV = Shots saved;SV% = Save percentage;

== See also ==
- 1960–61 NHL season
