= Joe Schaefer =

American ice hockey player

- Born: December 21, 1924 Long Island, New York, United States
- Died: December 27, 2000 (aged 76) Ladson, South Carolina, United States
- Height: 5 ft 8 in (173 cm)
- Weight: 180 lb (82 kg; 12 st 12 lb)
- Position: Goaltender
- Caught: Left
- Played for: New York Rangers
- Playing career: 1955–1961

Joseph Patrick Schaefer (December 21, 1924 – December 27, 2000) was an American ice hockey goaltender. He played two games in the National Hockey League with the New York Rangers, one game each in the 1959–60 and 1960–61 seasons. Schaefer was born on Long Island, New York.

== Career statistics ==
=== Regular season and playoffs ===
			Regular season									Playoffs
Season	Team	League	GP	W	L	T	MIN	GA	SO	GAA	SV%	GP	W	L	MIN	GA	SO	GAA	SV%
1955–56	New Haven Blades	EHL	1	—	—	—	60	3	0	3.00	—	—	—	—	—	—	—	—	—
1956–57	Philadelphia Ramblers	EHL	2	—	—	—	120	9	0	4.50	—	—	—	—	—	—	—	—	—
1957–58	Buffalo Bisons	AHL	1	0	1	0	60	12	0	12.00	—	—	—	—	—	—	—	—	—
1957–58	Philadelphia Ramblers	EHL	1	—	—	—	60	5	0	5.00	—	—	—	—	—	—	—	—	—
1958–59	Johnstown Jets	EHL	1	0	1	0	60	11	0	11.00	—	—	—	—	—	—	—	—	—
1959–60	New York Rangers	NHL	1	0	1	0	40	5	0	7.57	.773	—	—	—	—	—	—	—	—
1960–61	New York Rangers	NHL	1	0	1	0	50	3	0	3.64	.900	—	—	—	—	—	—	—	—
NHL totals			2	0	2	0	90	8	0	5.49	.846	—	—	—	—	—	—	—	—
