= 1960–61 Toronto Maple Leafs season =

NHL hockey team season

1960–61 Toronto Maple Leafs
- League: 2nd NHL
- 1960–61 record: 39–19–12
- Home record: 21–6–8
- Road record: 18–13–4
- Goals for: 234
- Goals against: 176

Team information
- General manager: Punch Imlach
- Coach: Punch Imlach
- Captain: George Armstrong
- Arena: Maple Leaf Gardens

Team leaders
- Goals: Frank Mahovlich (48)
- Assists: Red Kelly (50)
- Points: Frank Mahovlich (84)
- Penalty minutes: Frank Mahovlich (131)
- Wins: Johnny Bower (33)
- Goals against average: Gerry McNamara (2.40)

The 1960–61 Toronto Maple Leafs season was the 44th season of operation of the Toronto franchise in the National Hockey League (NHL). The Leafs placed second, making the playoffs for the third consecutive year before losing in the semi-finals to the Detroit Red Wings.

== Regular season ==
=== Final standings ===
National Hockey League
		GP	W	L	T	GF	GA	DIFF	Pts
1	Montreal Canadiens	70	41	19	10	254	188	+66	92
2	Toronto Maple Leafs	70	39	19	12	234	176	+58	90
3	Chicago Black Hawks	70	29	24	17	198	180	+18	75
4	Detroit Red Wings	70	25	29	16	195	215	−20	66
5	New York Rangers	70	22	38	10	204	248	−44	54
6	Boston Bruins	70	15	42	13	176	254	−78	43

=== Record vs. opponents ===
1960–61 NHL Records
Team	BOS	CHI	DET	MTL	NYR	TOR
Boston	—	4–6–4	4–8–2	2–10–2	3–9–2	2–9–3
Chicago	6–4–4	—	6–4–4	5–5–4	7–4–3	5–7–2
Detroit	8–4–2	4–6–4	—	4–7–3	7–5–2	2–7–5
Montreal	10–2–2	5–5–4	7–4–3	—	11–2–1	8–6
New York	9–3–2	4–7–3	5–7–2	2–11–1	—	2–10–2
Toronto	9–2–3	7–5–2	7–2–5	6–8	10–2–2	—

== Schedule and results ==
1960–61 regular season
October

Game	Result	Date	Score	Opponent	Record
3	T	October 9, 1960	3–3	@ Detroit Red Wings (1960–61)	0–2–1
4	L	October 12, 1960	0–3	@ Chicago Black Hawks (1960–61)	0–3–1
5	T	October 15, 1960	1–1	Boston Bruins (1960–61)	0–3–2
6	W	October 16, 1960	7–2	@ New York Rangers (1960–61)	1–3–2
7	W	October 19, 1960	3–1	Montreal Canadiens (1960–61)	2–3–2
8	L	October 22, 1960	1–2	Detroit Red Wings (1960–61)	2–4–2
9	W	October 23, 1960	3–1	@ Detroit Red Wings (1960–61)	3–4–2
10	W	October 29, 1960	8–4	Chicago Black Hawks (1960–61)	4–4–2
11	W	October 30, 1960	3–1	@ New York Rangers (1960–61)	5–4–2

November

Game	Result	Date	Score	Opponent	Record
12	T	November 2, 1960	2–2	Boston Bruins (1960–61)	5–4–3
13	L	November 3, 1960	1–3	@ Montreal Canadiens (1960–61)	5–5–3
14	W	November 5, 1960	7–3	New York Rangers (1960–61)	6–5–3
15	L	November 9, 1960	0–2	@ Chicago Black Hawks (1960–61)	6–6–3
16	W	November 12, 1960	7–1	Chicago Black Hawks (1960–61)	7–6–3
17	W	November 13, 1960	4–2	@ Boston Bruins (1960–61)	8–6–3
18	T	November 16, 1960	3–3	Detroit Red Wings (1960–61)	8–6–4
19	W	November 19, 1960	6–3	Montreal Canadiens (1960–61)	9–6–4
20	W	November 20, 1960	3–2	@ Boston Bruins (1960–61)	10–6–4
21	L	November 24, 1960	1–2	@ Chicago Black Hawks (1960–61)	10–7–4
22	T	November 26, 1960	3–3	Detroit Red Wings (1960–61)	10–7–5
23	L	November 27, 1960	0–2	@ Detroit Red Wings (1960–61)	10–8–5

December

Game	Result	Date	Score	Opponent	Record
24	L	December 1, 1960	3–6	@ Montreal Canadiens (1960–61)	10–9–5
25	W	December 3, 1960	5–2	New York Rangers (1960–61)	11–9–5
26	W	December 4, 1960	5–2	@ Boston Bruins (1960–61)	12–9–5
27	L	December 7, 1960	2–6	Montreal Canadiens (1960–61)	12–10–5
28	W	December 10, 1960	5–2	Chicago Black Hawks (1960–61)	13–10–5
29	W	December 11, 1960	6–1	@ Chicago Black Hawks (1960–61)	14–10–5
30	W	December 15, 1960	4–2	@ Montreal Canadiens (1960–61)	15–10–5
31	T	December 17, 1960	3–3	Boston Bruins (1960–61)	15–10–6
32	W	December 18, 1960	3–2	@ New York Rangers (1960–61)	16–10–6
33	T	December 24, 1960	4–4	Detroit Red Wings (1960–61)	16–10–7
34	W	December 25, 1960	4–1	@ Boston Bruins (1960–61)	17–10–7
35	L	December 28, 1960	1–4	Montreal Canadiens (1960–61)	17–11–7
36	W	December 31, 1960	2–1	New York Rangers (1960–61)	18–11–7

January

Game	Result	Date	Score	Opponent	Record
37	W	January 1, 1961	4–1	@ New York Rangers (1960–61)	19–11–7
38	W	January 4, 1961	6–4	Detroit Red Wings (1960–61)	20–11–7
39	W	January 5, 1961	4–1	@ Detroit Red Wings (1960–61)	21–11–7
40	W	January 7, 1961	4–1	Boston Bruins (1960–61)	22–11–7
41	L	January 8, 1961	1–5	@ Chicago Black Hawks (1960–61)	22–12–7
42	L	January 12, 1961	2–6	@ Montreal Canadiens (1960–61)	22–13–7
43	W	January 14, 1961	4–1	Chicago Black Hawks (1960–61)	23–13–7
44	W	January 15, 1961	6–4	@ Boston Bruins (1960–61)	24–13–7
45	T	January 18, 1961	4–4	New York Rangers (1960–61)	24–13–8
46	L	January 21, 1961	1–3	Boston Bruins (1960–61)	24–14–8
47	W	January 25, 1961	5–3	Montreal Canadiens (1960–61)	25–14–8
48	L	January 26, 1961	4–5	@ Boston Bruins (1960–61)	25–15–8
49	W	January 28, 1961	2–1	Chicago Black Hawks (1960–61)	26–15–8
50	W	January 29, 1961	4–1	@ New York Rangers (1960–61)	27–15–8

February

Game	Result	Date	Score	Opponent	Record
51	W	February 2, 1961	5–0	@ Detroit Red Wings (1960–61)	28–15–8
52	W	February 4, 1961	4–2	Detroit Red Wings (1960–61)	29–15–8
53	T	February 5, 1961	1–1	@ Chicago Black Hawks (1960–61)	29–15–9
54	W	February 8, 1961	5–3	New York Rangers (1960–61)	30–15–9
55	W	February 11, 1961	6–3	Boston Bruins (1960–61)	31–15–9
56	W	February 12, 1961	4–2	@ Detroit Red Wings (1960–61)	32–15–9
57	L	February 15, 1961	1–3	Montreal Canadiens (1960–61)	32–16–9
58	W	February 18, 1961	5–2	Chicago Black Hawks (1960–61)	33–16–9
59	L	February 19, 1961	2–4	@ New York Rangers (1960–61)	33–17–9
60	W	February 23, 1961	4–2	@ Montreal Canadiens (1960–61)	34–17–9
61	W	February 25, 1961	3–1	Detroit Red Wings (1960–61)	35–17–9
62	T	February 26, 1961	2–2	@ Detroit Red Wings (1960–61)	35–17–10

March

Game	Result	Date	Score	Opponent	Record
63	W	March 1, 1961	3–1	Montreal Canadiens (1960–61)	36–17–10
64	W	March 4, 1961	5–4	New York Rangers (1960–61)	37–17–10
65	L	March 5, 1961	1–3	@ Chicago Black Hawks (1960–61)	37–18–10
66	T	March 11, 1961	2–2	Chicago Black Hawks (1960–61)	37–18–11
67	W	March 12, 1961	5–0	@ Boston Bruins (1960–61)	38–18–11
68	L	March 16, 1961	2–5	@ Montreal Canadiens (1960–61)	38–19–11
69	W	March 18, 1961	6–2	Boston Bruins (1960–61)	39–19–11
70	T	March 19, 1961	2–2	@ New York Rangers (1960–61)	39–19–12

Legend: Win (2 points) Loss (0 points) Tie (1 point)

== Player statistics ==
=== Regular season ===
Scoring

Player	GP	G	A	Pts	PIM
Frank Mahovlich	70	48	36	84	131
Red Kelly	64	20	50	70	12
Bob Nevin	68	21	37	58	13
Bert Olmstead	67	18	34	52	84
Dave Keon	70	20	25	45	6
Billy Harris	66	12	27	39	30
Allan Stanley	68	9	25	34	42
Dick Duff	67	16	17	33	54
George Armstrong	47	14	19	33	21
Bob Pulford	40	11	18	29	41
Eddie Shack	55	14	14	28	90
Ron Stewart	51	13	12	25	8
Tim Horton	57	6	15	21	75
Bob Baun	70	1	14	15	70
Carl Brewer	51	1	14	15	92
Larry Hillman	62	3	10	13	59
John MacMillan	31	3	5	8	8
Larry Regan	37	3	5	8	2
Gerry Ehman	14	1	1	2	2
Johnny Wilson	3	0	1	1	0
Johnny Bower	58	0	0	0	0
Garry Edmundson	3	0	0	0	0
Gary Jarrett	1	0	0	0	0
Cesare Maniago	7	0	0	0	2
Jack Martin	1	0	0	0	0
Gerry McNamara	5	0	0	0	2

Goaltending

Player	MIN	GP	W	L	T	GA	GAA	SA	SV	SV%	SO
Johnny Bower	3480	58	33	15	10	145	2.50				2
Cesare Maniago	420	7	4	2	1	17	2.43				0
Gerry McNamara	300	5	2	2	1	12	2.40				0
Team:	4200	70	39	19	12	174	2.49				2

=== Playoffs ===
Scoring

Player	GP	G	A	Pts	PIM
Bert Olmstead	3	1	2	3	10
Allan Stanley	5	0	3	3	0
George Armstrong	5	1	1	2	0
Dave Keon	5	1	1	2	0
Frank Mahovlich	5	1	1	2	6
Billy Harris	5	1	0	1	0
Red Kelly	2	1	0	1	0
Bob Nevin	5	1	0	1	2
Ron Stewart	5	1	0	1	2
Dick Duff	5	0	1	1	2
Bob Baun	3	0	0	0	8
Johnny Bower	3	0	0	0	2
Carl Brewer	5	0	0	0	4
Larry Hillman	5	0	0	0	0
Tim Horton	5	0	0	0	0
John MacMillan	4	0	0	0	0
Cesare Maniago	2	0	0	0	0
Bob Pulford	5	0	0	0	8
Larry Regan	4	0	0	0	0
Eddie Shack	4	0	0	0	2

Goaltending

Player	MIN	GP	W	L	T	GA	GAA	SA	SV	SV%	SO
Cesare Maniago	145	2	1	1		6	2.48				0
Johnny Bower	180	3	0	3		8	2.67				0
Team:	325	5	1	4		14	2.58				0

== Farm teams ==
- Rochester Americans AHL
- Toronto Marlboros OHA Jr. A
- St. Mikes Majors Metro Jr. A
