= Ron Murphy =

Canadian ice hockey player

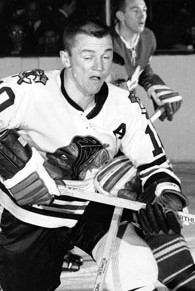
- Born: April 10, 1933 Hamilton, Ontario, Canada
- Died: March 6, 2014 (aged 80)
- Height: 5 ft 11 in (180 cm)
- Weight: 185 lb (84 kg; 13 st 3 lb)
- Position: Left wing
- Shot: Left
- Played for: New York Rangers; Chicago Black Hawks; Detroit Red Wings; Boston Bruins
- Playing career: 1952–1970

Robert Ronald Murphy (April 10, 1933 – March 6, 2014) was a Canadian professional ice hockey player who played for the New York Rangers, Chicago Black Hawks, Detroit Red Wings and Boston Bruins over the course of an 889-game National Hockey League (NHL) career between 1952 and 1970. He was with Stanley Cup-winning teams with the Black Hawks in 1961 and the Bruins in 1970.

== Playing career ==
Murphy played the better part of 18 years between 1952 and 1970, most notably on a Bruins line with Phil Esposito and Ken Hodge, which broke the league record for scoring by a forward line in the 1968–69 NHL season with 263 points. The record was subsequently broken two years later by Esposito, Hodge and Wayne Cashman. 1968–69 represented a comeback year for Murphy, who had missed most of the preceding two seasons following multiple operations on a chronically bad shoulder, and he initially retired after that season. His health improving over the summer, Murphy rejoined the Bruins for the beginning of the 1970 season, but recurrences of his chronic injuries reduced him to spot duty over 20 games, and he retired for good in March 1970.

Murphy's career was nearly cut short late in the second period of a New York Rangers' 3–1 victory over the Montreal Canadiens at Madison Square Garden on December 20, 1953. During a stick-swinging incident with Montreal's Boom Boom Geoffrion, the then-20-year-old left wing sustained a broken jaw and concussion after Geoffrion took a two-handed swing and made contact with the left side of Murphy's face. Murphy was suspended for five games for his role in the incident, but the injuries cost him the remainder of the season. Geoffrion was banned from all matches between the two teams for the rest of the campaign. The incident was recorded on black-and-white film used by Rangers coach Frank Boucher. The footage was discovered in 2011 when MSG Media moved its film and videotape archive out of Madison Square Garden while the building was undergoing renovations.

== Post-playing career ==
After his retirement he coached the Kitchener Rangers of the Ontario Hockey League.

Murphy died on March 6, 2014, at the age of 80.

== Career statistics ==
=== Regular season and playoffs ===
			Regular season					Playoffs
Season	Team	League	GP	G	A	Pts	PIM	GP	G	A	Pts	PIM
1949–50	Guelph Biltmores	OHA	1	0	0	0	2	—	—	—	—	—
1950–51	Guelph Biltmores	OHA	54	44	44	88	38	4	2	1	3	2
1951–52	Guelph Biltmores	OHA	51	58	58	116	36	10	8	7	15	2
1951–52	Guelph Biltmores	M-Cup	—	—	—	—	—	12	13	7	20	4
1951–52	Cincinnati Mohawks	AHL	1	0	0	0	0	—	—	—	—	—
1952–53	Guelph Biltmores	OHA	45	39	42	81	52	—	—	—	—	—
1952–53	New York Rangers	NHL	15	3	1	4	0	—	—	—	—	—
1953–54	New York Rangers	NHL	27	1	3	4	20	—	—	—	—	—
1953–54	Saskatoon Quakers	WHL	24	7	5	12	2	6	1	2	3	2
1954–55	New York Rangers	NHL	66	14	16	30	36	—	—	—	—	—
1955–56	New York Rangers	NHL	66	16	28	44	71	5	0	1	1	2
1956–57	New York Rangers	NHL	33	7	12	19	14	5	0	0	0	0
1956–57	Providence Reds	AHL	21	12	11	23	14	—	—	—	—	—
1957–58	Chicago Black Hawks	NHL	69	11	17	28	32	—	—	—	—	—
1958–59	Chicago Black Hawks	NHL	59	17	30	47	52	—	—	—	—	—
1959–60	Chicago Black Hawks	NHL	63	15	21	36	18	4	1	0	1	0
1960–61	Chicago Black Hawks	NHL	70	21	19	40	30	12	2	1	3	0
1961–62	Chicago Black Hawks	NHL	60	12	16	28	41	—	—	—	—	—
1962–63	Chicago Black Hawks	NHL	68	18	16	34	28	1	0	0	0	0
1963–64	Chicago Black Hawks	NHL	70	11	8	19	32	7	0	1	1	8
1964–65	Chicago Black Hawks	NHL	58	20	19	39	32	5	0	1	1	4
1965–66	Detroit Red Wings	NHL	32	10	7	17	10	—	—	—	—	—
1965–66	Boston Bruins	NHL	2	0	1	1	0	—	—	—	—	—
1966–67	Boston Bruins	NHL	39	11	16	27	6	—	—	—	—	—
1967–68	Boston Bruins	NHL	12	0	1	1	4	4	0	0	0	0
1967–68	Oklahoma City Blazers	CHL	6	2	2	4	2	—	—	—	—	—
1968–69	Boston Bruins	NHL	60	16	38	54	26	10	4	4	8	12
1969–70	Boston Bruins	NHL	20	2	5	7	8	—	—	—	—	—
NHL totals			889	205	274	479	460	53	7	8	15	26
