= Gilles Tremblay (ice hockey) =

Canadian ice hockey player

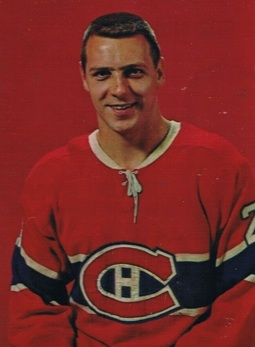
- Born: December 17, 1938; Montmorency, Quebec, Canada
- Died: November 26, 2014 (aged 75); Montreal, Quebec, Canada
- Height: 5 ft 10 in (178 cm)
- Weight: 170 lb (77 kg; 12 st 2 lb)
- Position: Left wing
- Shot: Left
- Played for: Montreal Canadiens
- Playing career: 1956–1969

Joseph Jean Gilles Tremblay (December 17, 1938 – November 26, 2014) was a Canadian ice hockey left winger who played his entire National Hockey League (NHL) career with the Montreal Canadiens from 1960 to 1969.

== Career ==
Tremblay played 509 NHL games, scored 168 goals and added 162 assists before injuries led to his retirement at the age of 31. He was a member of four Stanley Cup championship teams with Montreal, in 1965, 1966, 1968, and 1969.

After his hockey player career, from 1971 to 1997, he worked as a French-language broadcaster for ice hockey; he won the 2002 Foster Hewitt Memorial Award for his work. Tremblay died of heart failure on November 26, 2014.

== Career statistics ==
			Regular season					Playoffs
Season	Team	League	GP	G	A	Pts	PIM	GP	G	A	Pts	PIM
1956–57	Hull-Ottawa Canadiens	OHA-Jr.	18	3	4	7	2	—	—	—	—	—
1956–57	Hull-Ottawa Canadiens	EOHL	8	0	2	2	2	—	—	—	—	—
1956–57	Hull-Ottawa Canadiens	QHL	14	2	1	3	0	—	—	—	—	—
1956–57	Hull-Ottawa Canadiens	M-Cup	—	—	—	—	—	15	5	4	9	4
1957–58	Hull-Ottawa Canadiens	OHA-Jr.	27	15	12	27	6	—	—	—	—	—
1957–58	Hull-Ottawa Canadiens	EOHL	36	13	19	32	10	—	—	—	—	—
1957–58	Hull-Ottawa Canadiens	M-Cup	—	—	—	—	—	13	6	11	17	6
1958–59	Hull-Ottawa Canadiens	EOHL	3	1	0	1	4	—	—	—	—	—
1958–59	Rochester Americans	AHL	3	1	1	2	2	—	—	—	—	—
1958–59	Hull-Ottawa Canadiens	M-Cup	—	—	—	—	—	9	3	5	8	6
1959–60	Hull-Ottawa Canadiens	EPHL	67	32	51	83	45	7	4	3	7	8
1960–61	Montreal Canadiens	NHL	45	7	11	18	4	6	1	3	4	0
1960–61	Hull-Ottawa Canadiens	EPHL	14	9	11	20	12	—	—	—	—	—
1961–62	Montreal Canadiens	NHL	70	32	22	54	28	6	1	0	1	2
1962–63	Montreal Canadiens	NHL	60	25	24	49	42	5	2	0	2	0
1963–64	Montreal Canadiens	NHL	61	22	15	37	21	2	0	0	0	0
1964–65	Montreal Canadiens	NHL	26	9	7	16	16	—	—	—	—	—
1965–66	Montreal Canadiens	NHL	70	27	21	48	24	10	4	5	9	0
1966–67	Montreal Canadiens	NHL	62	13	19	32	16	10	0	1	1	0
1967–68	Montreal Canadiens	NHL	71	23	28	51	8	9	1	5	6	2
1968–69	Montreal Canadiens	NHL	44	10	15	25	2	—	—	—	—	—
NHL totals			509	168	162	330	161	48	9	14	23	4
