= Kenny Wharram =

Canadian ice hockey player (1933–2017)

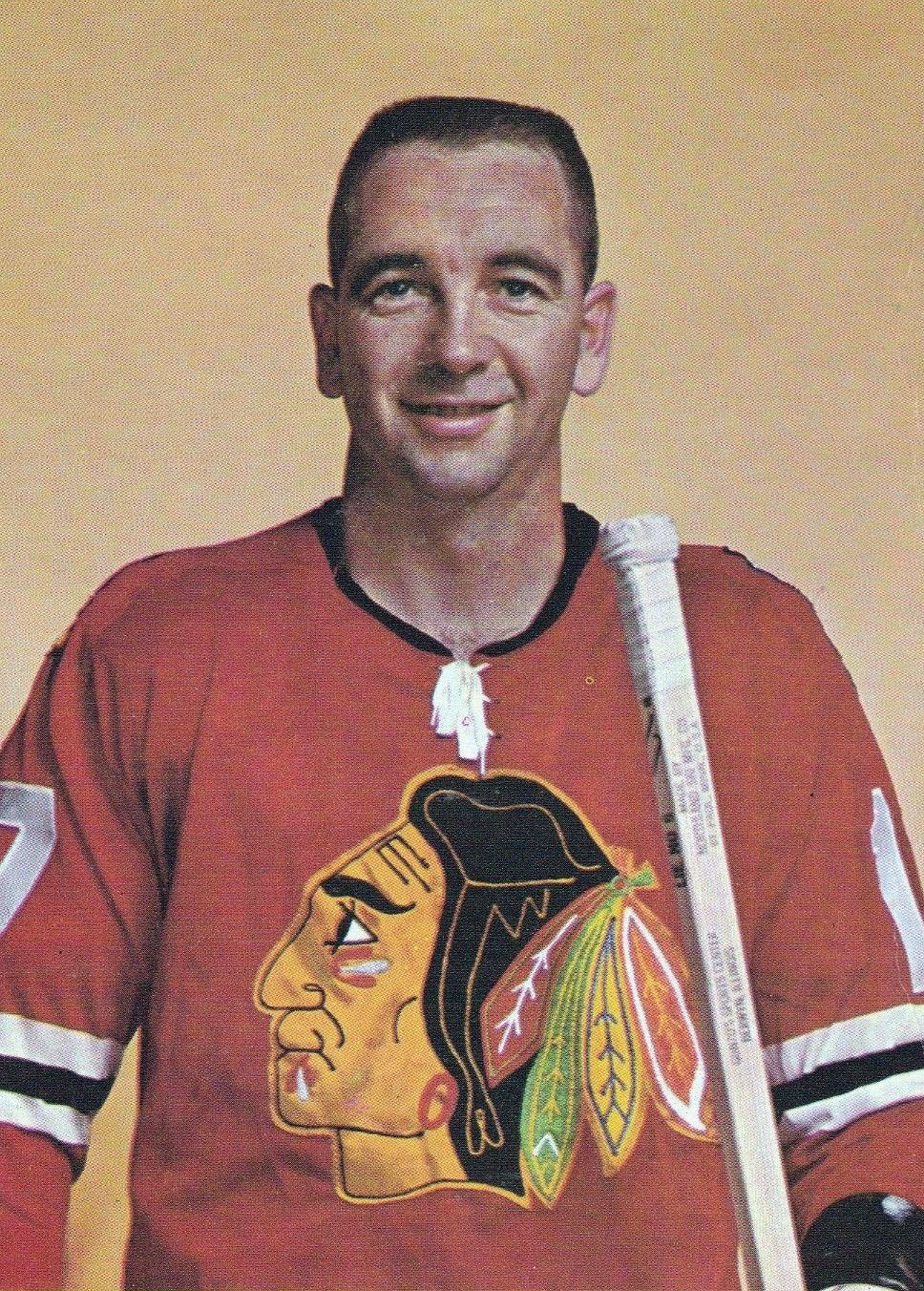
- Wharram with the Chicago Black Hawks, c. 1963
- Born: July 2, 1933 Ferris, Ontario, Canada
- Died: January 10, 2017 (aged 83) North Bay, Ontario, Canada
- Height: 5 ft 9 in (175 cm)
- Weight: 155 lb (70 kg; 11 st 1 lb)
- Position: Right Wing
- Shot: Right
- Played for: Chicago Black Hawks
- Playing career: 1951–1969

Kenneth Malcolm Wharram (July 2, 1933 – January 10, 2017) was a Canadian professional ice hockey right winger who played 14 seasons in the National Hockey League (NHL), all with the Chicago Black Hawks, wearing number 17. He won a Stanley Cup in 1961.

== Early life and career ==
Wharram started his hockey career with his hometown team the North Bay Black Hawks in 1949 before switching the next season to the Galt Black Hawks for whom he played three seasons. He played one match for the Galt team's parent club the Chicago Black Hawks in 1951 before returning for another season to Galt. He played 29 matches for the Hawks in 1953–54 but spent an equal amount of time at the Quebec Aces in the Quebec Hockey League before joining the American Hockey League Buffalo Bisons in 1954. Under the training of Bisons' coach Harry Watson he enjoyed four productive seasons, made the AHL's second all star team in 1955, and returned to Chicago to stay in 1958.

== The Scooter Line ==
Wharram still seemed to struggle to find a spot on the Hawks until he was teamed on a line with Stan Mikita. Mikita and Wharram meshed well together and Wharram's production - attributable to his considerable speed and puck-handling skills - soared. He would have seven straight seasons scoring 20 or more goals.

All that was needed was a left winger, and the Hawks got one in veteran Ted Lindsay, then near the end of his career. It would be Lindsay, Mikita and Wharram who formed the original Scooter Line. After Lindsay retired, Ab McDonald assumed the honors, and it would be this version of the Scooter Line in force when the Hawks won the 1961 Stanley Cup. After McDonald was traded to the Boston Bruins, Doug Mohns was placed in the left wing spot.

== Sudden retirement and death ==
Wharram was attending the Black Hawks' training camp on September 16, 1969, when he noticed he was having chest pains. He was quickly sent to a hospital intensive care unit where he was diagnosed with myocarditis. Wharram's condition worsened to the point where he needed to be trained how to stay awake. The process took weeks, and while Wharram's life was eventually out of danger, the stress of playing hockey made a comeback out of the question. He officially retired in September 1970 and settled down in North Bay as a carpenter. He was inducted to the North Bay Hall of Fame in 1980. Wharram died on January 10, 2017, at the age of 83.

== Career statistics ==
			Regular season					Playoffs
Season	Team	League	GP	G	A	Pts	PIM	GP	G	A	Pts	PIM
1949–50	North Bay Black Hawks	EOHL	2	0	1	1	0	—	—	—	—	—
1950–51	Galt Black Hawks	OHA-Jr.	53	35	38	73	28	3	2	3	5	2
1951–52	Galt Black Hawks	OHA-Jr.	45	35	79	114	37	—	—	—	—	—
1951–52	Chicago Black Hawks	NHL	1	0	0	0	0	—	—	—	—	—
1952–53	Galt Black Hawks	OHA-Jr.	54	34	40	74	42	11	9	14	23	2
1953–54	Chicago Black Hawks	NHL	29	1	7	8	8	—	—	—	—	—
1953–54	Quebec Aces	QHL	29	7	10	17	8	—	—	—	—	—
1954–55	Buffalo Bisons	AHL	63	33	49	82	15	10	9	7	16	4
1955–56	Chicago Black Hawks	NHL	3	0	0	0	0	—	—	—	—	—
1955–56	Buffalo Bisons	AHL	59	27	63	90	27	5	4	2	6	2
1956–57	Buffalo Bisons	AHL	64	28	49	77	18	—	—	—	—	—
1957–58	Buffalo Bisons	AHL	58	31	26	57	14	—	—	—	—	—
1958–59	Chicago Black Hawks	NHL	66	10	9	19	14	6	0	2	2	2
1959–60	Chicago Black Hawks	NHL	59	14	11	25	16	4	1	1	2	0
1960–61	Chicago Black Hawks	NHL	64	16	29	45	12	12	3	5	8	12
1961–62	Chicago Black Hawks	NHL	62	14	23	37	24	12	3	4	7	8
1962–63	Chicago Black Hawks	NHL	55	20	18	38	17	6	1	5	6	0
1963–64	Chicago Black Hawks	NHL	70	39	32	71	18	7	2	2	4	6
1964–65	Chicago Black Hawks	NHL	68	20	24	44	27	12	2	3	5	4
1965–66	Chicago Black Hawks	NHL	69	26	17	43	28	6	1	0	1	4
1966–67	Chicago Black Hawks	NHL	70	31	34	65	21	6	2	2	4	2
1967–68	Chicago Black Hawks	NHL	74	27	42	69	18	9	1	3	4	0
1968–69	Chicago Black Hawks	NHL	76	30	39	69	19	—	—	—	—	—
NHL totals			766	252	281	533	222	80	16	27	43	38

Preceded by Dave Keon	Winner of the Lady Byng Trophy; 1964	Succeeded by Bobby Hull
