= Al Johnson (ice hockey) =

Canadian ice hockey player (1935–2019)

- Born: March 30, 1935 Winnipeg, Manitoba, Canada
- Died: February 7, 2019 (aged 83) Calgary, Alberta, Canada
- Height: 5 ft 11 in (180 cm)
- Weight: 180 lb (82 kg; 12 st 12 lb)
- Position: Right wing/Centre
- Shot: Right
- Played for: Montreal Canadiens; Detroit Red Wings
- National team: Canada
- Playing career: 1954–1969

Allan Edmund Johnson (March 30, 1935 – February 7, 2019) was a Canadian professional ice hockey forward.

== Career ==
Johnson played 105 games in the National Hockey League for the Montreal Canadiens and Detroit Red Wings between 1957 and 1962. The rest of his career, which lasted from 1954 to 1969, was spent in various minor leagues. Internationally he played for the Canadian national team at the 1965 World Championships.

== Career statistics ==
=== Regular season and playoffs ===
| | | | Regular season | | | | | Playoffs |
| Season | Team | League | GP | G | A | Pts | PIM | GP | G | A | Pts | PIM |
|---|---|---|---|---|---|---|---|---|---|---|---|---|
| 1951–52 | St. Boniface Canadiens | MJHL | 1 | 0 | 0 | 0 | 2 | — | — | — | — | — |
| 1951–52 | St. Boniface Canadiens | MAHA | 10 | 8 | 15 | 23 | — | — | — | — | — | — |
| 1952–53 | St. Boniface Canadiens | MJHL | 22 | 4 | 12 | 16 | 2 | 7 | 2 | 2 | 4 | 2 |
| 1952–53 | St. Boniface Canadiens | M-Cup | — | — | — | — | — | 17 | 4 | 7 | 11 | 8 |
| 1953–54 | St. Boniface Canadiens | MJHL | 36 | 13 | 31 | 44 | 40 | 10 | 8 | 10 | 18 | 34 |
| 1953–54 | St. Boniface Canadiens | M-Cup | — | — | — | — | — | 8 | 3 | 2 | 5 | 8 |
| 1954–55 | Trois-Rivieres Reds | QJHL-B | 44 | 14 | 17 | 31 | 23 | 10 | 5 | 5 | 10 | 2 |
| 1954–55 | Montreal Royals | QSHL | 2 | 0 | 1 | 1 | 2 | — | — | — | — | — |
| 1955–56 | Winnipeg Warriors | WHL | 2 | 0 | 0 | 0 | 0 | — | — | — | — | — |
| 1955–56 | Souris Elks | BIG-6 | 28 | 33 | 30 | 63 | 18 | — | — | — | — | — |
| 1955–56 | Winnipeg Maroons | Al-Cup | — | — | — | — | — | 9 | 2 | 6 | 8 | 2 |
| 1956–57 | Montreal Canadiens | NHL | 2 | 0 | 1 | 1 | 2 | — | — | — | — | — |
| 1956–57 | Cincinnati Mohawks | IHL | 56 | 29 | 29 | 58 | 36 | 7 | 2 | 2 | 4 | 2 |
| 1957–58 | Shawinigan Falls Cataractes | QSHL | 57 | 15 | 28 | 43 | 18 | 14 | 8 | 10 | 18 | 2 |
| 1958–59 | Spokane Spokes | WHL | 68 | 30 | 33 | 63 | 28 | 4 | 0 | 0 | 0 | 7 |
| 1959–60 | Spokane Comets | WHL | 69 | 29 | 27 | 56 | 28 | — | — | — | — | — |
| 1960–61 | Detroit Red Wings | NHL | 70 | 16 | 21 | 37 | 14 | 11 | 2 | 2 | 4 | 6 |
| 1961–62 | Detroit Red Wings | NHL | 31 | 5 | 6 | 11 | 14 | — | — | — | — | — |
| 1961–62 | Hershey Bears | AHL | 40 | 15 | 25 | 40 | 14 | 7 | 4 | 2 | 6 | 2 |
| 1962–63 | Detroit Red Wings | NHL | 2 | 0 | 0 | 0 | 0 | — | — | — | — | — |
| 1962–63 | Pittsburgh Hornets | AHL | 58 | 15 | 19 | 34 | 24 | — | — | — | — | — |
| 1963–64 | Winnipeg Maroons | SSHL | 6 | 6 | 4 | 10 | 2 | — | — | — | — | — |
| 1963–64 | Winnipeg Maroons | Al-Cup | — | — | — | — | — | 13 | 8 | 10 | 18 | 12 |
| 1964–65 | Winnipeg Maroons | SSHL | 6 | 6 | 8 | 14 | 6 | — | — | — | — | — |
| 1965–66 | Canadian National Team | Intl | — | — | — | — | — | — | — | — | — | — |
| 1967–68 | Fort Worth Wings | CHL | 46 | 23 | 27 | 50 | 27 | — | — | — | — | — |
| 1968–69 | Denver Spurs | WHL | 71 | 27 | 22 | 49 | 10 | — | — | — | — | — |
| WHL totals | | | 210 | 86 | 82 | 168 | 66 | 4 | 0 | 0 | 0 | 7 |
| NHL totals | | | 105 | 21 | 28 | 49 | 30 | 11 | 2 | 2 | 4 | 6 |

=== International ===
| Year | Team | Event | GP | G | A | Pts | PIM |
|---|---|---|---|---|---|---|---|
| 1965 | Canada | WC | 7 | 4 | 2 | 6 | 6 |
| Senior totals | | | 7 | 4 | 2 | 6 | 6 |

== Awards and achievements ==
- WHL Coast Division Second All-Star Team (1959)
- WHL First All-Star Team (1960)
- Allan Cup Championship (1964)
