= 1960–61 NHL season =

National Hockey League season

- League: National Hockey League
- Sport: Ice hockey
- Duration: October 5, 1960 – April 16, 1961
- Games: 70
- Teams: 6
- TV partner(s): CBC, SRC (Canada); None (United States)

Regular season
- Season champion: Montreal Canadiens
- Season MVP: Bernie Geoffrion (Canadiens)
- Top scorer: Bernie Geoffrion (Canadiens)

Stanley Cup
- Champions: Chicago Black Hawks
- Runners-up: Detroit Red Wings

NHL seasons
- ← 1959–60 1961–62 →

The 1960–61 NHL season was the 44th season of the National Hockey League. Six teams played 70 games each. The Chicago Black Hawks defeated the Detroit Red Wings in the Stanley Cup Finals four games to two to win the Stanley Cup. It was the first series since 1950 with two American-based teams. It was Chicago's first Cup win since 1938; they would not win another until 2010.

Red Wings' forward Gordie Howe became the first player in NHL history to score 1,000 regular-season points. It took seven more seasons before the Montreal Canadiens' Jean Beliveau would match the feat.

== League business ==
The original Hart Trophy was retired, as all its plaques were filled and its general condition had deteriorated. A new trophy was commissioned and the award was renamed the Hart Memorial Trophy.

== Off-season ==
On September 15, 1960, Maurice "Rocket" Richard announced his retirement from hockey. During his career, he had led all scorers with a record 544 goals plus an additional 82 goals in the playoffs. Despite the league expanding the number of games in a season to 70 games from 50 since Richard's famous 50 goals in 50 games, Richard remained the only player to score 50 goals in a season, until this season.

== Regular season ==
By this season, the Chicago Black Hawks were a strong team. Their defence included Pierre Pilote, Al Arbour, Jack Evans, and Elmer Vasko. Up front, youngsters Bobby Hull and Stan Mikita led the offense, and goaltender Glenn Hall was the Hawks' steady presence between the pipes.

It was reported that Eddie Shore, the great Boston Bruins defenceman and four-time league MVP from the 1930s, had been stricken with a heart attack, but was resting comfortably in a Springfield, Massachusetts hospital.

On October 13, the Canadiens routed the Rangers 8–4, with Bernie Geoffrion and Dickie Moore each scoring hat tricks.

Jack McCartan got his only NHL shutout for the New York Rangers by blanking the Black Hawks 2–0 on October 19. Chicago's Reg Fleming set a record with 37 penalty minutes in this game. They included three major penalties for battles with Dean Prentice, Eddie Shack, and John Hanna, a misconduct, and a game misconduct.

On December 1, the Canadiens, who had traded André Pronovost to Boston for Jean-Guy Gendron, defeated the Toronto Maple Leafs 6–3 at the Montreal Forum. Gendron had a goal, but the main feature was the 21 penalties referee Frank Udvari had to call, including several majors in the third period. Henri Richard took on Frank Mahovlich, Dickie Moore squared off with Bob Pulford, and Marcel Bonin scrapped with Bobby Baun. Toronto general manager and head coach George "Punch" Imlach was in a bad mood following the game and said to the press among other things that Udvari and linesmen Loring Doolittle and George Hayes should have been picked as the three stars for the help they gave to Montreal. Imlach's comments were brought to the attention of NHL president Clarence Campbell, who fined the Leafs bench boss $200.

In the new year, Stan Mikita helped to spark Chicago. He scored two goals in a 3–2 win over the Rangers on January 4 and scored the winner when the Black Hawks beat Boston 4–3 the following night.

Former Canadiens defenceman Leo Lamoureux died in Indianapolis on January 11 at age 45.

Chicago defeated the Rangers 4–3 on March 8. New York goalie Gump Worsley pulled a hamstring muscle and Joe Shaefer replaced him with the score 1–1. The next night, the Rangers were eliminated from the playoffs as Bernie Geoffrion potted a hat trick in a 6–1 pasting by the Canadiens.

Toronto's Johnny Bower, who appeared on his way to winning the Vezina Trophy, strained a leg muscle and would have to take a rest. Cesare Maniago played in goal for the Leafs on March 16 and lost 5–2. It looked like two players, Toronto's Frank Mahovlich and Montreal's Bernie "Boom Boom" Geoffrion, were going to hit 50 goals, but Mahovlich ended up slumping near the end of the season and missed 50 by two goals. Geoffrion scored his 50th goal that night and got a wild ovation. He also added 45 assists and led the league in scoring.

Toronto played a 2–2 tie with the Rangers in their final game of the season and Bobby Baun was a victim of his own hard-hitting. Camille Henry of the Rangers ran into Baun and Henry's skate cut Baun in the neck. Baun returned for the third period, but after the game, while boarding the team bus, he began to gasp desperately. He groped for attention and waved his arms, and his teammates finally realized he was in trouble and rushed him to the hospital where an emergency operation was performed to permit breathing. Baun missed some action in the playoffs as the result of the injury.

=== Final standings ===
National Hockey League
		GP	W	L	T	GF	GA	DIFF	Pts
1	Montreal Canadiens	70	41	19	10	254	188	+66	92
2	Toronto Maple Leafs	70	39	19	12	234	176	+58	90
3	Chicago Black Hawks	70	29	24	17	198	180	+18	75
4	Detroit Red Wings	70	25	29	16	195	215	−20	66
5	New York Rangers	70	22	38	10	204	248	−44	54
6	Boston Bruins	70	15	42	13	176	254	−78	43

== Playoffs ==
For the Montreal Canadiens, their defeat to eventual Stanley Cup champion Chicago Black Hawks in the first round ended two streaks (ten consecutive Finals appearances and five consecutive Stanley Cup wins). The Detroit Red Wings defeated the Toronto Maple Leafs in the other semifinal to set up an all-American final between Chicago and Detroit.

=== Playoff bracket ===
The top four teams in the league qualified for the playoffs. In the semifinals, the first-place team played the third-place team, while the second-place team faced the fourth-place team, with the winners advancing to the Stanley Cup Finals. In both rounds, teams competed in a best-of-seven series (scores in the bracket indicate the number of games won in each best-of-seven series).

Semifinals
1	Montreal	2
3	Chicago	4
2	Toronto	1
4	Detroit	4

Stanley Cup Finals
3	Chicago	4
4	Detroit	2

=== Semifinals ===
==== (1) Montreal Canadiens vs. (3) Chicago Black Hawks ====
March 21	Chicago Black Hawks	2–6	Montreal Canadiens	Montreal Forum	Recap
Tod Sloan (1) – 11:04		First period	02:53 – Bernie Geoffrion (1)
Pierre Pilote (1) – pp – 19:23		Second period	01:21 – Gilles Tremblay (1)
No scoring		Third period	03:23 – Claude Provost (1); 06:10 – Dickie Moore (1); 07:57 – Phil Goyette (1); 10:06 – pp – Jean-Guy Talbot (1)
Glenn Hall 21 saves / 27 shots		Goalie stats	Jacques Plante 25 saves / 27 shots

March 23	Chicago Black Hawks	4–3	Montreal Canadiens	Montreal Forum	Recap
No scoring		First period	No scoring
Stan Mikita (1) – pp – 09:02; Kenny Wharram (1) – 13:18		Second period	16:02 – Bernie Geoffrion (2); 18:36 – Henri Richard (1)
Bobby Hull (1) – 08:23; Ed Litzenberger (1) – 17:05		Third period	10:26 – Phil Goyette (2)
Glenn Hall 25 saves / 28 shots		Goalie stats	Jacques Plante 19 saves / 23 shots

March 26	Montreal Canadiens	1–2	3OT	Chicago Black Hawks	Chicago Stadium	Recap
No scoring		First period		No scoring
No scoring		Second period		18:33 – Murray Balfour (1)
Henri Richard (2) – pp – 19:24		Third period		No scoring
No scoring		Third overtime period		12:12 – pp – Murray Balfour (2)
Jacques Plante 43 saves / 45 shots		Goalie stats		Glenn Hall 53 saves / 54 shots

March 28	Montreal Canadiens	5–2	Chicago Black Hawks	Chicago Stadium	Recap
Phil Goyette (3) – 04:02; Dickie Moore (2) – 17:57		First period	04:24 – Dollard St. Laurent (1)
Bill Hicke (1); Dickie Moore (3) – pp – 14:18		Second period	09:28 – Stan Mikita (2)
Bill Hicke (2) – 04:24		Third period	No scoring
Jacques Plante 19 saves / 21 shots		Goalie stats	Glenn Hall 45 saves / 50 shots

April 1	Chicago Black Hawks	3–0	Montreal Canadiens	Montreal Forum	Recap
No scoring		First period	No scoring
Moose Vasko (1) – pp – 08:34		Second period	No scoring
Ab McDonald (1) – 13:17; Stan Mikita (3) – 15:40		Third period	No scoring
Glenn Hall 32 saves / 32 shots		Goalie stats	Jacques Plante 32 saves / 35 shots

April 4	Montreal Canadiens	0–3	Chicago Black Hawks	Chicago Stadium	Recap
No scoring		First period	No scoring
No scoring		Second period	01:15 – Bill Hay (1); 05:49 – pp – Bobby Hull (2); 15:58 – Eric Nesterenko (1)
No scoring		Third period	No scoring
Jacques Plante 24 saves / 27 shots		Goalie stats	Glenn Hall 24 saves / 24 shots

Chicago won series 4–2

==== (2) Toronto Maple Leafs vs. (4) Detroit Red Wings ====
March 22	Detroit Red Wings	2–3	2OT	Toronto Maple Leafs	Maple Leaf Gardens	Recap
Alex Delvecchio (1) – 00:14		First period		No scoring
No scoring		Second period		02:20 – pp – Bob Nevin (1)
Howie Young (1) – 01:46		Third period		14:26 – Ron Stewart (1)
No scoring		Second overtime period		04:51 – George Armstrong (1)
Terry Sawchuck 33 saves / 36 shots		Goalie stats		Cesare Maniago 37 saves / 39 shots

March 25	Detroit Red Wings	4–2	Toronto Maple Leafs	Maple Leaf Gardens	Recap
No scoring		First period	No scoring
Marcel Pronovost (1) – 07:49; Leo Labine (1) – sh – 16:27		Second period	04:04 – Billy Harris (1)
Gerry Melnyk (1) – 05:34; Vic Stasiuk (1) – 08:02		Third period	09:49 – Frank Mahovlich (1)
Terry Sawchuck 18 saves / 20 shots		Goalie stats	Cesare Maniago 20 saves / 24 shots

March 26	Toronto Maple Leafs	0–2	Detroit Red Wings	Olympia Stadium	Recap
No scoring		First period	No scoring
No scoring		Second period	No scoring
No scoring		Third period	04:51 – Gordie Howe (1); 06:13 – Val Fonteyne (1)
Johnny Bower 30 saves / 32 shots		Goalie stats	Terry Sawchuck 29 saves / 29 shots

March 28	Toronto Maple Leafs	1–4	Detroit Red Wings	Olympia Stadium	Recap
Bert Olmstead (1) – pp – 12:52		First period	19:08 – pp – Leo Labine (2)
No scoring		Second period	11:20 – Gordie Howe (2)
No scoring		Third period	03:24 – Marcel Pronovost (2); 19:55 – en – Val Fonteyne (2)
Johnny Bower 32 saves / 35 shots		Goalie stats	Terry Sawchuck 32 saves / 33 shots

April 1	Detroit Red Wings	3–2	Toronto Maple Leafs	Maple Leaf Gardens	Recap
Gordie Howe (3) – sh – 04:26; Len Lunde (1) – pp – 14:11		First period	No scoring
Al Johnson (1) – 05:27		Second period	16:11 – pp – Red Kelly (1)
No scoring		Third period	13:51 – Dave Keon (1)
Terry Sawchuck 25 saves / 27 shots		Goalie stats	Johnny Bower 30 saves / 33 shots

Detroit won series 4–1

=== Stanley Cup Finals ===
Chicago defeated the Red Wings in six games to win their first Cup since 1938, and their last until 2010.

April 6	Detroit Red Wings	2–3	Chicago Black Hawks	Chicago Stadium	Recap
No scoring		First period	09:39 – pp – Bobby Hull (3); 10:10 – Kenny Wharram (2); 13:15 – Bobby Hull (4)
Len Lunde (2) – pp – 16:14		Second period	No scoring
Al Johnson (2) – 19:18		Third period	No scoring
Terry Sawchuck 7 saves / 10 shots Hank Bassen 21 saves / 21 shots		Goalie stats	Glenn Hall 34 saves / 36 shots

April 8	Chicago Black Hawks	1–3	Detroit Red Wings	Olympia Stadium	Recap
No scoring		First period	08:10 – Howie Young (2); 17:39 – pp – Alex Delvecchio (2)
Pierre Pilote (2) – 00:41		Second period	No scoring
No scoring		Third period	19:22 – en – Alex Delvecchio (3)
Glenn Hall 35 saves / 37 shots		Goalie stats	Hank Bassen 26 saves / 27 shots

April 10	Detroit Red Wings	1–3	Chicago Black Hawks	Chicago Stadium	Recap
No scoring		First period	No scoring
No scoring		Second period	11:54 – Stan Mikita (4); 14:19 – Ron Murphy (1); 18:16 – Murray Balfour (3)
Gordie Howe (4) – 09:28		Third period	No scoring
Hank Bassen 33 saves / 36 shots		Goalie stats	Glenn Hall 35 saves / 36 shots

April 12	Chicago Black Hawks	1–2	Detroit Red Wings	Olympia Stadium	Recap
No scoring		First period	No scoring
Bill Hay (2) – 07:34		Second period	08:48 – pp – Alex Delvecchio (4)
No scoring		Third period	13:10 – Bruce MacGregor (1)
Glenn Hall 28 saves / 30 shots		Goalie stats	Terry Sawchuck 26 saves / 27 shots

April 14	Detroit Red Wings	3–6	Chicago Black Hawks	Chicago Stadium	Recap
Leo Labine (3) – 02:14; Howie Glover (1) – pp – 15:35		First period	09:36 – Murray Balfour (4); 10:04 – Ron Murphy (2)
Vic Stasiuk (2) – 18:49		Second period	16:25 – Murray Balfour (5)
No scoring		Third period	02:51 – pp – Stan Mikita (5); 07:02 – Pierre Pilote (3); 13:27 – Stan Mikita (6)
Terry Sawchuck 38 saves / 44 shots		Goalie stats	Glenn Hall 33 saves / 36 shots

April 16	Chicago Black Hawks	5–1	Detroit Red Wings	Olympia Stadium	Recap
No scoring		First period	15:24 – pp – Parker MacDonald (1)
Reg Fleming (1) – sh – 06:45; Ab McDonald (2) – 18:49		Second period	No scoring
Eric Nesterenko (2) – 00:57; Jack Evans (1) – 06:27; Kenny Wharram (3) – 18:00		Third period	No scoring
Glenn Hall 21 saves / 22 shots		Goalie stats	Hank Bassen 20 saves / 25 shots

Chicago won series 4–2

== Awards ==
1960–61 NHL awards
Prince of Wales Trophy: (Regular season champion)	Montreal Canadiens
Art Ross Trophy: (Top scorer)	Bernie Geoffrion, Montreal Canadiens
Calder Memorial Trophy: (Best first-year player)	Dave Keon, Toronto Maple Leafs
Hart Memorial Trophy: (Most valuable player)	Bernie Geoffrion, Montreal Canadiens
James Norris Memorial Trophy: (Best defenceman)	Doug Harvey, Montreal Canadiens
Lady Byng Memorial Trophy: (Excellence and sportsmanship)	Red Kelly, Toronto Maple Leafs
Vezina Trophy: (Goaltender of team with the best goals-against average)	Johnny Bower, Toronto Maple Leafs

=== All-Star teams ===
First team	Position	Second team
Johnny Bower, Toronto Maple Leafs	G	Glenn Hall, Chicago Black Hawks
Doug Harvey, Montreal Canadiens	D	Allan Stanley, Toronto Maple Leafs
Marcel Pronovost, Detroit Red Wings	D	Pierre Pilote, Chicago Black Hawks
Jean Beliveau, Montreal Canadiens	C	Henri Richard, Montreal Canadiens
Bernie Geoffrion, Montreal Canadiens	RW	Gordie Howe, Detroit Red Wings
Frank Mahovlich, Toronto Maple Leafs	LW	Dickie Moore, Montreal Canadiens

== Player statistics ==
=== Scoring leaders ===
Note: GP = Games played, G = Goals, A = Assists, Pts = Points, PIM = Penalties in minutes

Player	Team	GP	G	A	Pts	PIM
Bernie Geoffrion	Montreal Canadiens	64	50	45	95	29
Jean Beliveau	Montreal Canadiens	69	32	58	90	57
Frank Mahovlich	Toronto Maple Leafs	70	48	36	84	131
Andy Bathgate	New York Rangers	70	29	48	77	22
Gordie Howe	Detroit Red Wings	64	23	49	72	30
Norm Ullman	Detroit Red Wings	70	28	42	70	34
Red Kelly	Toronto Maple Leafs	64	20	50	70	12
Dickie Moore	Montreal Canadiens	57	35	34	69	62
Henri Richard	Montreal Canadiens	70	24	44	68	91
Alex Delvecchio	Detroit Red Wings	70	27	35	62	26

=== Leading goaltenders ===
Note: GP = Games played; Min = Minutes played; GA = Goals against; GAA = Goals against average; W = Wins; L = Losses; T = Ties; SO = Shutouts

Player	Team	GP	MIN	GA	GAA	W	L	T	SO
Charlie Hodge	Montreal Canadiens	30	1800	74	2.47	19	8	3	4
Johnny Bower	Toronto Maple Leafs	58	3480	145	2.50	33	15	10	2
Glenn Hall	Chicago Black Hawks	70	4200	176	2.51	29	24	17	6
Hank Bassen	Detroit Red Wings	34	2120	98	2.77	13	12	9	0
Jacques Plante	Montreal Canadiens	40	2400	112	2.80	23	11	6	2
Terry Sawchuk	Detroit Red Wings	38	2080	112	3.23	12	17	7	2
Don Simmons	Boston Bruins	18	1080	58	3.23	3	9	6	1
Lorne Worsley	New York Rangers	59	3473	191	3.30	20	29	8	1
Bruce Gamble	Boston Bruins	52	3120	193	3.71	12	33	7	0

== Coaches ==
- Boston Bruins: Milt Schmidt
- Chicago Black Hawks: Rudy Pilous
- Detroit Red Wings: Sid Abel
- Montreal Canadiens: Toe Blake
- New York Rangers: Alfred Pike
- Toronto Maple Leafs: Punch Imlach

== Debuts ==
The following is a list of players of note who played their first NHL game in 1960–61 (listed with their first team, asterisk(*) marks debut in playoffs):

- Ted Green, Boston Bruins
- Chico Maki*, Chicago Black Hawks
- Bobby Rousseau, Montreal Canadiens
- Gilles Tremblay, Montreal Canadiens
- Rod Gilbert, New York Rangers
- Jean Ratelle, New York Rangers
- Cesare Maniago, Toronto Maple Leafs
- Dave Keon, Toronto Maple Leafs

== Last games ==
The following is a list of players of note that played their last game in the NHL in 1960–61 (listed with their last team):

- Willie O'Ree, Boston Bruins (First black player in the NHL)
- Fern Flaman, Boston Bruins
- Tod Sloan, Chicago Black Hawks
- Red Sullivan, New York Rangers
- Larry Regan, Toronto Maple Leafs

== Broadcasting ==
Hockey Night in Canada on CBC Television televised Saturday night regular season games and Stanley Cup playoff games. Games were not broadcast in their entirety until the 1968–69 season, and were typically joined in progress, while the radio version of HNIC aired games in their entirety.

In the U.S., CBS decided not the renew its agreement to continue airing Saturday afternoon regular season games in 1960–61, and the NHL would not be able to attract another American national network until the 1965–66 season.

== See also ==
- 1960–61 NHL transactions
- List of Stanley Cup champions
- 14th National Hockey League All-Star Game
- National Hockey League All-Star Game
- 1960 in sports
- 1961 in sports
