= Howie Glover =

Canadian ice hockey player (1935–2021)

- Born: February 14, 1935 Toronto, Ontario, Canada
- Died: June 15, 2021 (aged 86) Kitchener, Ontario, Canada
- Height: 5 ft 11 in (180 cm)
- Weight: 180 lb (82 kg; 12 st 12 lb)
- Position: Right wing
- Shot: Right
- Played for: Chicago Black Hawks; Detroit Red Wings; New York Rangers; Montreal Canadiens
- Playing career: 1955–1969

Howard Edward Glover (February 14, 1935 – June 15, 2021) was a Canadian professional ice hockey right winger. He played 144 games in the National Hockey League (NHL) with four teams between 1958 and 1969. The rest of his career, which lasted from 1955 to 1970, was spent in the minor leagues. His brother, Fred Glover, was also a player and coach in the NHL.

== Playing career ==
Glover played for the following teams during his career: Toronto Marlboros, Barrie Flyers, Cleveland Barons, Toledo-Marion Mercurys, Winnipeg Warriors, Chicago Black Hawks, Calgary Stampeders, Buffalo Bisons, Detroit Red Wings, Pittsburgh Hornets, New York Rangers and Montreal Canadiens.

Glover spent parts of five seasons in the NHL during the 1950s and 60s. In 144 regular season games, Glover recorded 29 goals and 17 assists for a career total of 46 points. The majority of his career was spent in the AHL where he was an impressive goal scorer. Glover recorded a career high 41 goals with the Cleveland Barons during the 1967–68 season.

Howie Glover was inducted to the Greater Cleveland Sports Hall of Fame along with his brother Fred in 2008. He died on June 15, 2021.

== Career statistics ==
=== Regular season and playoffs ===
			Regular season					Playoffs
Season	Team	League	GP	G	A	Pts	PIM	GP	G	A	Pts	PIM
1952–53	Weston Dukes	MetJBHL	—	—	—	—	—	—	—	—	—	—
1952–53	Toronto Marlboros	OHA	34	1	4	5	9	6	0	1	1	6
1953–54	Toronto Marlboros	OHA	19	5	3	8	17	—	—	—	—	—
1953–54	Kitchener Greenshirts	OHA	42	17	9	26	53	4	0	0	0	7
1954–55	Barrie Flyers	OHA	48	10	9	19	72	—	—	—	—	—
1955–56	Toledo-Marion Mercurys	IHL	60	23	23	46	108	9	1	3	4	4
1955–56	Cleveland Barons	AHL	2	0	1	1	0	—	—	—	—	—
1956–57	North Bay Trappers	NOHA	—	—	—	—	—	—	—	—	—	—
1957–58	Winnipeg Warriors	WHL	67	38	34	72	72	7	4	1	5	8
1958–59	Chicago Black Hawks	NHL	13	0	1	1	2	—	—	—	—	—
1958–59	Calgary Stampeders	WHL	42	12	22	34	63	8	4	3	7	8
1959–60	Buffalo Bisons	AHL	68	31	25	56	95	—	—	—	—	—
1960–61	Detroit Red Wings	NHL	66	21	8	29	46	11	1	2	3	2
1961–62	Detroit Red Wings	NHL	39	7	8	15	44	—	—	—	—	—
1962–63	Pittsburgh Hornets	AHL	71	22	30	52	94	—	—	—	—	—
1963–64	New York Rangers	NHL	25	1	0	1	9	—	—	—	—	—
1964–65	Cleveland Barons	AHL	26	21	7	28	49	—	—	—	—	—
1965–66	Cleveland Barons	AHL	56	9	14	23	96	12	5	0	5	21
1966–67	Cleveland Barons	AHL	48	18	16	34	66	5	2	0	2	0
1967–68	Cleveland Barons	AHL	69	41	22	63	121	—	—	—	—	—
1968–69	Montreal Canadiens	NHL	1	0	0	0	0	—	—	—	—	—
1968–69	Cleveland Barons	AHL	73	24	35	59	44	5	2	1	3	4
1969–70	Cleveland Barons	AHL	32	12	14	26	49	—	—	—	—	—
AHL totals			445	178	164	342	614	22	9	1	10	25
NHL totals			144	29	17	46	101	11	1	2	3	2
