= Gary Aldcorn =

Canadian ice hockey player (born 1935)

- Born: March 7, 1935 (age 91) Shaunavon, Saskatchewan, Canada
- Height: 5 ft 11 in (180 cm)
- Weight: 170 lb (77 kg; 12 st 2 lb)
- Position: Left wing
- Shot: Left
- Played for: Toronto Maple Leafs; Detroit Red Wings; Boston Bruins
- National team: Canada
- Playing career: 1955–1963

Gary William Aldcorn (born March 7, 1935) is a Canadian former professional ice hockey left winger who played 226 games in the National Hockey League for the Boston Bruins, Detroit Red Wings, and Toronto Maple Leafs between 1956 and 1961. Over his NHL career, Aldcorn scored 41 regular-season goals and one goal in the Stanley Cup playoffs. Internationally Aldcorn played for the Canadian national team at the 1965 World Championships.

Before his career in the NHL, Aldcorn won the 1954 Allan Cup national senior ice hockey championship as a member of the Winnipeg Maroons, then won the 1955 Memorial Cup national junior ice hockey championship as a member of the Toronto Marlboros.

== Career statistics ==
=== Regular season and playoffs ===
| | | | Regular season | | | | | Playoffs |
| Season | Team | League | GP | G | A | Pts | PIM | GP | G | A | Pts | PIM |
|---|---|---|---|---|---|---|---|---|---|---|---|---|
| 1951–52 | Winnipeg Monarchs | MJHL | 20 | 9 | 7 | 16 | — | — | — | — | — | — |
| 1952–53 | Winnipeg Monarchs | MJHL | 35 | 18 | 24 | 42 | 16 | 4 | 2 | 0 | 2 | 2 |
| 1953–54 | Winnipeg Monarchs | MJHL | 36 | 23 | 14 | 37 | 37 | 5 | 4 | 2 | 6 | 2 |
| 1953–54 | Winnipeg Maroons | Al-Cup | — | — | — | — | — | 16 | 14 | 12 | 26 | 8 |
| 1954–55 | Toronto Marlboros | OHA | 47 | 27 | 22 | 49 | 59 | 13 | 5 | 6 | 11 | 45 |
| 1954–55 | Toronto Marlboros | M-Cup | — | — | — | — | — | 11 | 4 | 2 | 6 | 4 |
| 1955–56 | Winnipeg Warriors | WHL | 67 | 22 | 12 | 34 | 66 | 14 | 5 | 2 | 7 | 2 |
| 1956–57 | Toronto Maple Leafs | NHL | 22 | 5 | 1 | 6 | 4 | — | — | — | — | — |
| 1956–57 | Rochester Americans | AHL | 42 | 13 | 10 | 23 | 28 | 10 | 1 | 4 | 5 | 2 |
| 1957–58 | Toronto Maple Leafs | NHL | 59 | 10 | 14 | 24 | 12 | — | — | — | — | — |
| 1957–58 | Rochester Americans | AHL | 11 | 2 | 10 | 12 | 22 | — | — | — | — | — |
| 1958–59 | Toronto Maple Leafs | NHL | 5 | 0 | 3 | 3 | 2 | — | — | — | — | — |
| 1958–59 | Rochester Americans | AHL | 66 | 37 | 42 | 79 | 52 | 5 | 0 | 2 | 2 | 0 |
| 1959–60 | Detroit Red Wings | NHL | 70 | 22 | 29 | 51 | 32 | 6 | 1 | 2 | 3 | 4 |
| 1960–61 | Detroit Red Wings | NHL | 49 | 2 | 6 | 8 | 16 | — | — | — | — | — |
| 1960–61 | Boston Bruins | NHL | 21 | 2 | 3 | 5 | 12 | — | — | — | — | — |
| 1961–62 | Winnipeg Maroons | SSHL | — | — | — | — | — | — | — | — | — | — |
| 1962–63 | Winnipeg Maroons | SSHL | 3 | 1 | 3 | 4 | 2 | — | — | — | — | — |
| 1963–64 | Winnipeg Maroons | SSHL | — | — | — | — | — | — | — | — | — | — |
| 1964–65 | Winnipeg Olympics | SSHL | — | — | — | — | — | — | — | — | — | — |
| 1966–67 | Winnipeg Maroons | MSHL | — | — | — | — | — | — | — | — | — | — |
| 1967–68 | St. Boniface Mohawks | MSHL | — | — | — | — | — | — | — | — | — | — |
| NHL totals | | | 226 | 41 | 56 | 97 | 78 | 6 | 1 | 2 | 3 | 4 |

=== International ===
| Year | Team | Event | GP | G | A | Pts | PIM |
|---|---|---|---|---|---|---|---|
| 1965 | Canada | WC | 7 | 5 | 2 | 7 | 8 |
| Senior totals | | | 7 | 5 | 2 | 7 | 8 |

== Coaching statistics ==
Season  Team                   Lge  Type        GP  W  L T OTL Pct   
1967-68 St. Boniface Mohawks   MSHL Player-Head 24 10 13 1   0 0.43750  
1969-70 Canadian National Team Intl Assistant         

== Awards and achievements ==
- 1956: President's Cup (WHL) Championship
- 1956: Edinburgh Cup Championship
- Honoured Member of the Manitoba Hockey Hall of Fame
