= Don Simmons (ice hockey) =

Canadian ice hockey player (1931–2010)

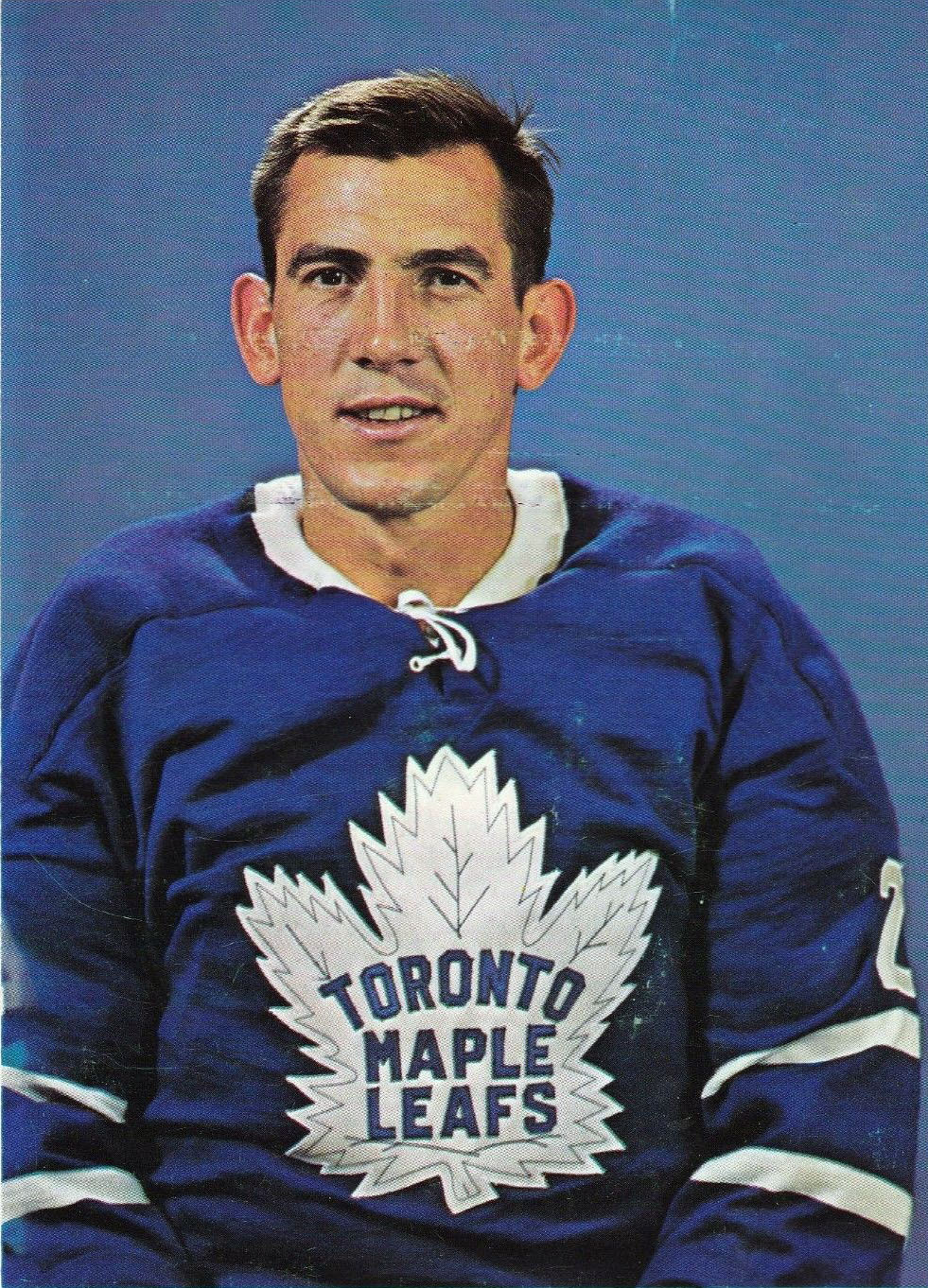
- Simmons with the Toronto Maple Leafs in the 1960s
- Born: September 13, 1931 Port Colborne, Ontario, Canada
- Died: September 24, 2010 (aged 79)
- Height: 5 ft 10 in (178 cm)
- Weight: 150 lb (68 kg; 10 st 10 lb)
- Position: Goaltender
- Caught: Right
- Played for: Boston Bruins; Toronto Maple Leafs; New York Rangers
- Playing career: 1951–1969

Donald William "Dippy" Simmons (September 13, 1931 – September 24, 2010) was a Canadian ice hockey goaltender. He played for the Boston Bruins, Toronto Maple Leafs, and New York Rangers of the National Hockey League (NHL) between 1956 and 1969. He won the Stanley Cup three times in a row with the Maple Leafs, from 1962 to 1964.

== Playing career ==
Simmons was called up by the Boston Bruins from the Springfield Indians of the minor American Hockey League in order to replace an ailing Terry Sawchuk who had left the Bruins in mid-season of 1957. He then spent 3 seasons partnering with veteran Harry Lumley as an effective netminding duo in Boston. Simmons was the second goaltender to adopt the face mask, after Jacques Plante introduced it in 1959. Later, Simmons would back up Johnny Bower in Toronto in the early 1960s and was instrumental in the Leafs winning the Stanley Cup in 1962. He finished his career playing with the New York Rangers. Don Simmons was the founder of Don Simmons Sports, a successful Ontario franchise specializing in goalie equipment.

== Career statistics ==
=== Regular season and playoffs ===
| | | | Regular season | | | | | | | | | Playoffs |
| Season | Team | League | GP | W | L | T | MIN | GA | SO | GAA | SV% | GP | W | L | MIN | GA | SO | GAA | SV% |
|---|---|---|---|---|---|---|---|---|---|---|---|---|---|---|---|---|---|---|---|
| 1948–49 | Galt Black Hawks | OHA | 12 | — | — | — | 720 | 73 | 0 | 6.08 | — | — | — | — | — | — | — | — | — |
| 1949–50 | Port Colborne Sailors | OHA Sr | — | — | — | — | — | — | — | — | — | — | — | — | — | — | — | — | — |
| 1950–51 | St. Catharines Teepees | OHA | 53 | — | — | — | 3180 | 181 | 3 | 3.41 | — | 6 | — | — | 360 | 19 | 1 | 3.17 | — |
| 1951–52 | Springfield Indians | EAHL | 37 | 18 | 18 | 1 | 2270 | 121 | 0 | 3.20 | — | 3 | 0 | 3 | 180 | 19 | 0 | 6.33 | — |
| 1952–53 | Springfield Indians | EAHL | 44 | 31 | 11 | 2 | 2680 | 168 | 0 | 3.76 | — | — | — | — | — | — | — | — | — |
| 1953–54 | Johnstown Jets | IHL | 24 | — | — | — | 1440 | 66 | 2 | 2.75 | — | 10 | 6 | 4 | 600 | 21 | 1 | 2.10 | — |
| 1954–55 | Springfield Indians | AHL | 54 | 30 | 21 | 3 | 3240 | 185 | 2 | 3.43 | — | 4 | 1 | 3 | 258 | 16 | 0 | 3.72 | — |
| 1955–56 | Springfield Indians | AHL | 52 | 13 | 37 | 2 | 3120 | 233 | 0 | 4.48 | — | — | — | — | — | — | — | — | — |
| 1956–57 | Boston Bruins | NHL | 26 | 13 | 9 | 4 | 1560 | 63 | 4 | 2.42 | .915 | 10 | 5 | 5 | 600 | 29 | 2 | 2.90 | .892 |
| 1956–57 | Springfield Indians | AHL | 25 | 10 | 12 | 3 | 1300 | 84 | 0 | 3.36 | — | — | — | — | — | — | — | — | — |
| 1957–58 | Boston Bruins | NHL | 39 | 15 | 14 | 9 | 2285 | 92 | 5 | 2.42 | .918 | 11 | 6 | 5 | 671 | 25 | 1 | 2.24 | .932 |
| 1958–59 | Boston Bruins | NHL | 58 | 24 | 26 | 8 | 3480 | 183 | 3 | 3.16 | .897 | — | — | — | — | — | — | — | — |
| 1959–60 | Boston Bruins | NHL | 28 | 12 | 13 | 3 | 1676 | 91 | 2 | 3.26 | .900 | — | — | — | — | — | — | — | — |
| 1960–61 | Boston Bruins | NHL | 18 | 3 | 9 | 6 | 1078 | 58 | 1 | 3.23 | .902 | — | — | — | — | — | — | — | — |
| 1960–61 | Providence Reds | AHL | 10 | 3 | 7 | 0 | 590 | 51 | 0 | 5.19 | — | — | — | — | — | — | — | — | — |
| 1961–62 | Toronto Maple Leafs | NHL | 9 | 5 | 3 | 1 | 540 | 21 | 1 | 2.33 | .927 | 3 | 2 | 1 | 166 | 8 | 0 | 2.90 | .889 |
| 1961–62 | Rochester Americans | AHL | 51 | 24 | 22 | 5 | 3060 | 169 | 0 | 3.31 | — | — | — | — | — | — | — | — | — |
| 1962–63 | Toronto Maple Leafs | NHL | 28 | 15 | 8 | 5 | 1680 | 69 | 1 | 2.47 | .904 | — | — | — | — | — | — | — | — |
| 1962–63 | Rochester Americans | AHL | 9 | 4 | 5 | 0 | 540 | 27 | 1 | 3.00 | — | — | — | — | — | — | — | — | — |
| 1963–64 | Toronto Maple Leafs | NHL | 21 | 9 | 10 | 1 | 1190 | 63 | 3 | 3.18 | .894 | — | — | — | — | — | — | — | — |
| 1964–65 | Tulsa Oilers | CPHL | 69 | 35 | 26 | 8 | 3540 | 219 | 3 | 3.17 | — | 12 | 6 | 6 | 720 | 38 | 1 | 3.17 | — |
| 1965–66 | New York Rangers | NHL | 12 | 1 | 7 | 1 | 551 | 40 | 0 | 4.36 | .867 | — | — | — | — | — | — | — | — |
| 1965–66 | Baltimore Clippers | AHL | 13 | 4 | 6 | 2 | 750 | 42 | 0 | 3.36 | — | — | — | — | — | — | — | — | — |
| 1966–67 | Vancouver Canucks | WHL | 72 | 38 | 32 | 2 | 4326 | 213 | 7 | 2.95 | — | 3 | 2 | 0 | 140 | 3 | 0 | 1.29 | — |
| 1967–68 | New York Rangers | NHL | 5 | 2 | 1 | 2 | 300 | 13 | 0 | 2.61 | .898 | — | — | — | — | — | — | — | — |
| 1967–68 | Buffalo Bisons | AHL | 22 | 9 | 7 | 5 | 1279 | 74 | 0 | 3.47 | — | — | — | — | — | — | — | — | — |
| 1968–69 | New York Rangers | NHL | 5 | 1 | 2 | 1 | 206 | 8 | 0 | 2.34 | .921 | — | — | — | — | — | — | — | — |
| 1968–69 | Buffalo Bisons | AHL | 5 | 2 | 3 | 0 | 259 | 14 | 1 | 3.24 | — | — | — | — | — | — | — | — | — |
| NHL totals | | | 249 | 100 | 102 | 41 | 14,541 | 701 | 20 | 2.89 | .904 | — | — | — | — | — | — | — | — |

== Awards and achievements ==
- 1962 Stanley Cup Championship (Toronto)
- 1963 Stanley Cup Championship (Toronto)
- 1964 Stanley Cup Championship (Toronto)
- 1963 NHL All Star (Toronto)
