= Jean-Guy Gendron =

Canadian ice hockey player (1934–2022)

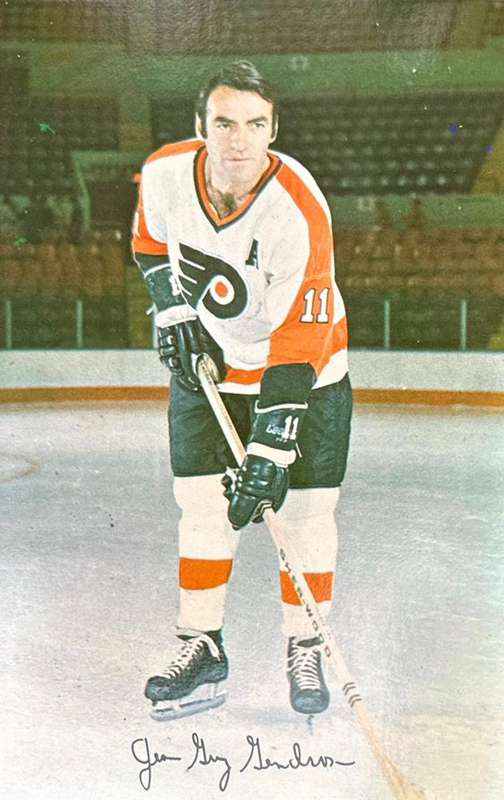
- 1970 postcard of Gendron
- Born: August 30, 1934 Montreal, Quebec, Canada
- Died: June 30, 2022 (aged 87) Quebec City, Quebec, Canada
- Height: 5 ft 9 in (175 cm)
- Weight: 165 lb (75 kg; 11 st 11 lb)
- Position: Left wing
- Shot: Left
- Played for: New York Rangers; Boston Bruins; Montreal Canadiens; Philadelphia Flyers; Quebec Nordiques
- Playing career: 1954–1974

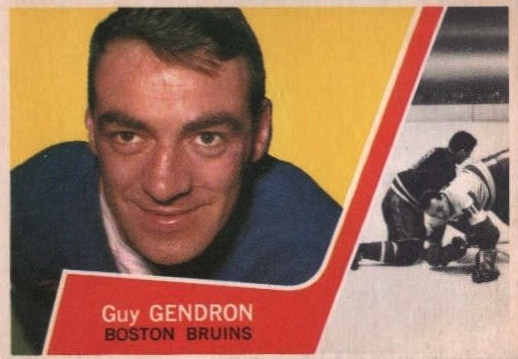
1963 Topps card of Gendron

Joseph Eudore Jean-Guy "Smitty" Gendron (August 30, 1934 – June 30, 2022) was a Canadian professional ice hockey left winger who played 863 games in the National Hockey League (NHL) for the New York Rangers, Boston Bruins, Montreal Canadiens and Philadelphia Flyers. Gendron scored his first NHL goal on November 9, 1955, for the New York Rangers in their 1–1 home tie versus the Montreal Canadiens. He also played 127 games in the World Hockey Association (WHA) for the Quebec Nordiques, a team for which he was the head coach for two seasons.

Gendron played junior hockey with the Trois-Rivieres Reds before making his professional debut with the Providence Reds in 1954. He scored an NHL career high 24 goals in 1959–60 despite generally being called upon to play a hard-nosed, defensive-oriented role.

== Personal life and death ==
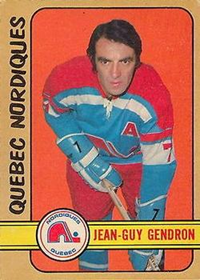
1972 OPC card of Gendron for Quebec Nordiques

He died on June 30, 2022, through medical assistance in dying (MAID).

== Career statistics ==
			Regular season					Playoffs
Season	Team	League	GP	G	A	Pts	PIM	GP	G	A	Pts	PIM
1951–52	Trois-Rivières Reds	QJHL	41	9	28	37	77	5	0	1	1	16
1952–53	Trois-Rivières Reds	QJHL	47	19	10	29	98	6	2	3	5	12
1952–53	Quebec Aces	QMHL	—	—	—	—	—	3	0	0	0	0
1953–54	Trois-Rivières Reds	QJHL	54	42	45	87	179	4	0	1	1	8
1954–55	Providence Reds	AHL	47	24	15	39	38	—	—	—	—	—
1955–56	New York Rangers	NHL	63	5	7	12	38	5	2	1	3	2
1956–57	New York Rangers	NHL	70	9	6	15	40	5	0	1	1	6
1957–58	New York Rangers	NHL	70	10	17	27	68	6	1	0	1	11
1958–59	Boston Bruins	NHL	60	15	9	24	57	7	1	0	1	18
1959–60	Boston Bruins	NHL	67	24	11	35	64	—	—	—	—	—
1960–61	Boston Bruins	NHL	13	1	7	8	24	—	—	—	—	—
1960–61	Montreal Canadiens	NHL	53	9	12	21	51	5	0	0	0	2
1961–62	New York Rangers	NHL	69	14	11	25	71	6	3	1	4	2
1962–63	Boston Bruins	NHL	66	21	22	43	42	—	—	—	—	—
1963–64	Boston Bruins	NHL	54	5	13	18	43	—	—	—	—	—
1963–64	Providence Reds	AHL	6	1	1	2	0	—	—	—	—	—
1964–65	Quebec Aces	AHL	53	20	14	34	61	5	1	1	2	8
1965–66	Quebec Aces	AHL	58	26	35	61	70	6	1	0	1	6
1966–67	Quebec Aces	AHL	68	28	45	73	72	5	2	1	3	4
1967–68	Philadelphia Flyers	NHL	1	0	1	1	2	—	—	—	—	—
1967–68	Quebec Aces	AHL	72	29	58	87	72	15	7	14	21	24
1968–69	Philadelphia Flyers	NHL	74	20	35	55	65	4	0	0	0	6
1969–70	Philadelphia Flyers	NHL	71	23	21	44	54	—	—	—	—	—
1970–71	Philadelphia Flyers	NHL	76	20	16	36	46	4	0	1	1	0
1971–72	Philadelphia Flyers	NHL	56	6	13	19	36	—	—	—	—	—
1972–73	Quebec Nordiques	WHA	63	17	33	50	113	—	—	—	—	—
1973–74	Quebec Nordiques	WHA	64	11	8	19	42	—	—	—	—	—
AHL totals			304	128	168	296	313	31	11	16	27	42
NHL totals			863	182	201	383	701	42	7	4	11	47
WHA totals			127	28	41	69	155	—	—	—	—	—

== WHA coaching record ==
Team	Year	Regular season						Postseason
Team	Year	G	W	L	T	Pts	Division rank	Result
QUE	1974–75	78	46	32	—	92	1st in Canadian	Lost in Avco Cup Finals
QUE	1975–76	81	50	27	4	104	2nd in Canadian	Lost in Quarterfinals
Total		159	96	59	4			2 playoff appearances

Preceded by Jacques Plante	Head coach of the Quebec Nordiques; 1974–1976	Succeeded by Marc Boileau
