= 1963–64 NHL transactions =

The following is a list of all team-to-team transactions that have occurred in the National Hockey League (NHL) during the 1963–64 NHL season. It lists which team each player has been traded to and for which player(s) or other consideration(s), if applicable.

== Trades ==
=== June ===
June 4, 1963	To Montreal Canadiens Dave Balon; Leon Rochefort; Len Ronson; Lorne Gump Worsley	To New York Rangers Phil Goyette; Don Marshall; Jacques Plante
June 5, 1963	To Chicago Black Hawks Howie Young	To Detroit Red Wings Roger Crozier; Ron Ingram

=== September ===
September 28, 1963	To Boston Bruins cash	To Montreal Canadiens Wayne Hicks

=== October ===
October 10, 1963	To Boston Bruins Gerry Odrowski	To Detroit Red Wings Warren Godfrey

=== February ===
February 14, 1964	To Detroit Red Wings Albert Langlois	To New York Rangers Ron Ingram
February 22, 1964	To New York Rangers Bob Nevin; Dick Duff; Bill Collins; Arnie Brown; Rod Seiling	To Toronto Maple Leafs Don McKenney; Andy Bathgate

April 19, 1964	To Montreal Canadiens Howie Glover	To New York Rangers Bev Bell; Ray Brunel
