= Camille Henry =

Canadian ice hockey player (1933–1997)

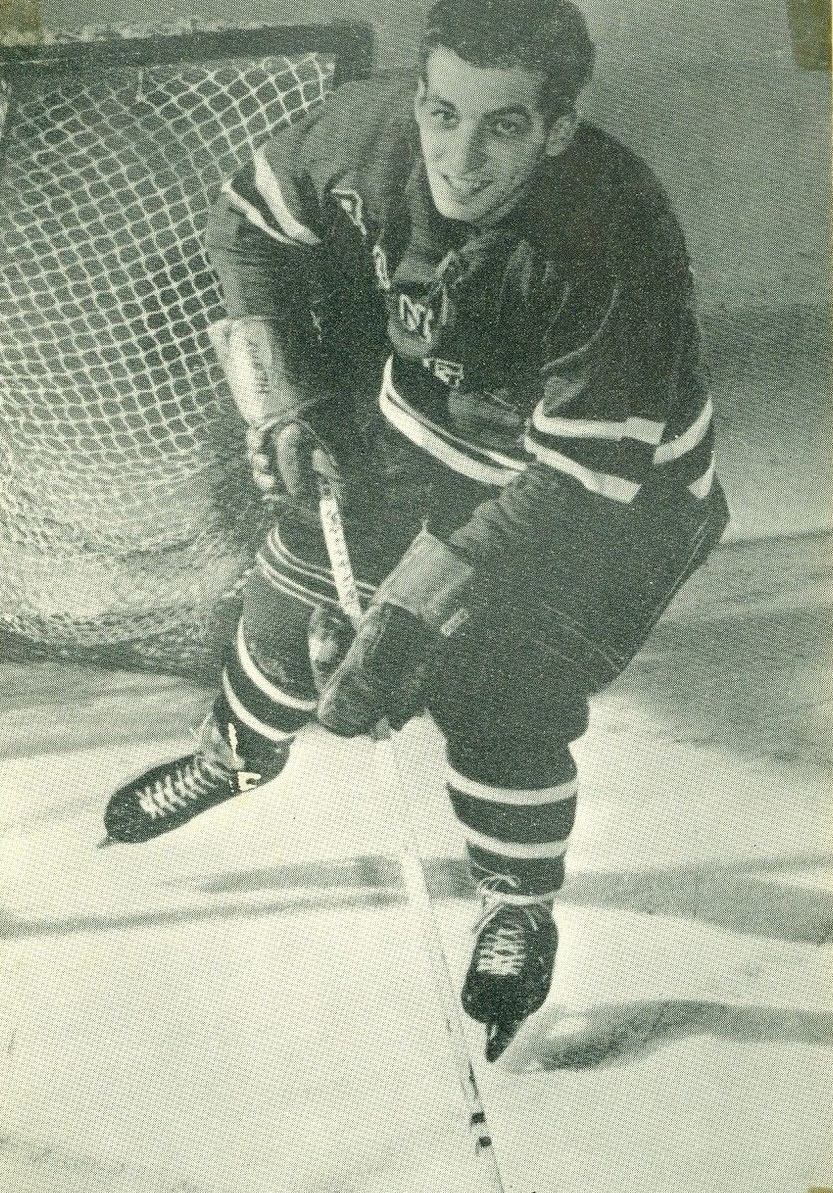
- Henry with the New York Rangers in 1954
- Born: January 31, 1933 Quebec City, Quebec, Canada
- Died: September 11, 1997 (aged 64) Quebec City, Quebec, Canada
- Height: 5 ft 7 in (170 cm)
- Weight: 152 lb (69 kg; 10 st 12 lb)
- Position: Centre
- Shot: Left
- Played for: New York Rangers; Chicago Black Hawks; St. Louis Blues
- Playing career: 1953–1970

Joseph Wilfred Camille "The Eel" Henry (January 31, 1933 – September 11, 1997) was a Canadian professional ice hockey left winger/centre who played for the New York Rangers, Chicago Black Hawks, and St. Louis Blues in the National Hockey League (NHL).

== Playing career ==
Born in Quebec City, Henry, nicknamed 'The Eel' played in the Quebec Junior Hockey League with the Quebec Citadelles during his junior career. Henry led the league in goals in 1951-52 with 52 and in 1952-53 with 46. He also led the league in points in 1951-52 with 114. He was selected to the QJHL First All-Star Team in 1951-52 and 1952-53. Henry also made an appearance in the 1953 Memorial Cup playoffs, posting 21 points in 8 games.

Henry made his National Hockey League debut with the New York Rangers in 1953-54. He had his greatest success wearing number 21 for the Rangers. At 5 ft 7 in (1.70 m) and 150 lb (68 kg), he was the smallest man in the NHL at the time and suffered numerous injuries throughout his career. He was known for his ability to swat the puck out of mid-air to score goals. He won the Calder Memorial Trophy as the National Hockey League rookie of the year beating out Jean Béliveau of the Montreal Canadiens. After playing 21 games with the Rangers the following season, Henry was traded to the Providence Reds of the American Hockey League. He was then loaned to the Quebec Aces in the Quebec Hockey League. Henry returned to the Reds in 1955-56, and led the AHL in goals with 50. Henry also led the Reds to a Calder Cup championship and, in the process, scored 10 goals in 9 games to lead all players in playoff scoring.

In 1956-57, Henry returned to the Rangers. He split his time with the Rangers and the Reds that season, before playing for 7 straight seasons with only the Rangers. Camille was selected as an NHL Second All-Star Team left winger in 1957-58, the year he also won the Lady Byng Memorial Trophy for best sportsmanship combined with production. In 1964-65, he was named captain of the New York Rangers. He also played in the 1958, 1963, and 1964 NHL All-Star Games. In 1964-65, Henry was traded to the Chicago Black Hawks for Paul Shmyr. Henry played 22 games with the Black Hawks posting eight points. During that season, Henry also made his first ever trip to the Stanley Cup Final. The Black Hawks ended up losing in seven games to the Montreal Canadiens.

He returned to New York in 1967–68, where he split his time with the Buffalo Bisons in the AHL. Henry was traded to the St. Louis Blues in 1968-69 where he went to the Stanley Cup Final in 1969. He played 2 seasons with the Blues before retiring.

== Notable appearances ==
On November 1, 1959 when Jacques Plante first wore a mask for protection in a game, Henry was the only player to score on him in that game.

On December 12, 1963 Henry participated in an NHL record when the Montreal Canadiens and the New York Rangers combined for the fastest three goals by two teams in NHL history. Dave Balon and Gilles Tremblay scored for Montreal and Henry scored for the Rangers, all within 18 seconds. The record stood until Feb. 10, 1983.

Henry scored the first-ever hat trick for the St. Louis Blues.

== Post-playing career ==
Henry coached the Kansas City Blues of the Central Hockey League in 1969-70 and then coached the New York Raiders of the World Hockey Association but he never duplicated his early success. He coached the New Jersey Rockets semi-pro hockey club that played at Ice World in Totowa, NJ in the mid/late 1970s. Henry eventually ran the twin rinks in Totowa, New Jersey, and Branchbrook Park in Newark.

Henry was married and divorced from Dominique Michel, famed Quebec chanteuse and comedienne. After his retirement Henry lived in Quebec City and held security jobs, eventually becoming essentially destitute. He was widely considered to have an alcohol consumption problem that was complicated by diabetes. He died shortly after receiving his first reimbursement for the players' pension fund that was awarded by the courts.

== Awards and achievements ==
- Selected to the QJHL First All-Star Team in 1952 and 1953.
- Calder Memorial Trophy winner in 1954.
- Selected to the AHL First All-Star Team in 1956.
- Calder Cup champion in 1956.
- Played in 1958, 1963 and 1964 NHL All-Star Games.
- Selected to the NHL Second All-Star Team in 1958.
- Lady Byng Memorial Trophy winner in 1958.
- In the 2009 book 100 Ranger Greats, was ranked No. 21 all-time of the 901 New York Rangers who had played during the team's first 82 seasons
- On November 1, 1959, when Jacques Plante donned a mask for the first time, Henry was the only player in that game to score on him.

== Career statistics ==
=== Regular season and playoffs ===
			Regular season					Playoffs
Season	Team	League	GP	G	A	Pts	PIM	GP	G	A	Pts	PIM
1949–50	Quebec Citadelles	QJHL	1	0	0	0	0	—	—	—	—	—
1950–51	Quebec Citadelles	QJHL	46	25	23	48	26	22	13	12	25	22
1951–52	Quebec Citadelles	QJHL	50	55	59	114	59	6	8	4	12	2
1952–53	Quebec Citadelles	QJHL	46	46	30	76	43	9	10	8	18	21
1952–53	Quebec Citadelles	M-Cup	—	—	—	—	—	8	14	7	21	2
1953–54	New York Rangers	NHL	66	24	15	39	10	—	—	—	—	—
1954–55	New York Rangers	NHL	21	5	2	7	4	—	—	—	—	—
1954–55	Quebec Aces	QHL	37	20	18	38	2	8	3	1	4	0
1955–56	Providence Reds	AHL	59	50	41	91	8	9	10	6	16	2
1956–57	New York Rangers	NHL	36	14	15	29	2	5	2	3	5	0
1956–57	Providence Reds	AHL	29	31	16	47	8	—	—	—	—	—
1957–58	New York Rangers	NHL	70	32	24	56	2	6	1	4	5	5
1958–59	New York Rangers	NHL	70	23	35	58	2	—	—	—	—	—
1959–60	New York Rangers	NHL	49	12	15	27	6	—	—	—	—	—
1960–61	New York Rangers	NHL	53	28	25	53	8	—	—	—	—	—
1961–62	New York Rangers	NHL	60	23	15	38	8	5	0	0	0	0
1962–63	New York Rangers	NHL	60	37	23	60	8	—	—	—	—	—
1963–64	New York Rangers	NHL	69	29	26	55	8	—	—	—	—	—
1964–65	New York Rangers	NHL	48	21	15	36	20	—	—	—	—	—
1964–65	Chicago Black Hawks	NHL	22	5	3	8	2	14	1	0	1	2
1965–66	St. Louis Braves	CPHL	37	14	22	36	4	5	2	1	3	0
1967–68	New York Rangers	NHL	36	8	12	20	0	6	0	0	0	0
1967–68	Buffalo Bisons	AHL	22	9	10	19	0	—	—	—	—	—
1968–69	St. Louis Blues	NHL	64	17	22	39	8	11	2	5	7	0
1969–70	St. Louis Blues	NHL	4	1	2	3	0	—	—	—	—	—
1969–70	Kansas City Blues	CHL	15	5	7	12	4	—	—	—	—	—
NHL totals			727	279	249	528	88	47	6	12	18	7

== Coaching record ==
Team	Year	Regular season						Postseason
Team	Year	G	W	L	T	Pts	Finish	Result
New York Raiders	1972–73	78	33	43	2	68	6th in WHA East	Missed playoffs
Jersey Knights	1973–74	20	6	12	2	14	6th in WHA East	Missed playoffs

Awards
Preceded by Lorne "Gump" Worsley	Winner of the Calder Memorial Trophy; 1954	Succeeded by Ed Litzenberger
Preceded by Andy Hebenton	Winner of the Lady Byng Trophy; 1958	Succeeded by Alex Delvecchio
Sporting positions
Preceded by Andy Bathgate	New York Rangers captain 1964–65	Succeeded by Bob Nevin
