= 1965–66 NHL transactions =

The following is a list of all team-to-team transactions that have occurred in the National Hockey League (NHL) during the 1965–66 NHL season. It lists which team each player has been traded to and for which player(s) or other consideration(s), if applicable.

== Transactions ==
May 20, 1965	To Toronto Maple Leafs Autry Erickson; Larry Jeffrey; Eddie Joyal; Lowell MacDonald; Marcel Pronovost	To Detroit Red Wings Andy Bathgate; Billy Harris; Gary Jarrett
May 31, 1965	To Boston Bruins Bob Dillabough; Ron Harris; Albert Langlois; Parker MacDonald	To Detroit Red Wings Bob McCord; Ab McDonald; Ken Stephanson
June 4, 1965	To Chicago Black Hawks Dick Meissner; Mel Pearson; Tracy Pratt; Dave Richardson	To New York Rangers Ray Cullen; John McKenzie
June 8, 1965	To Detroit Red Wings Bob Cunningham	To New York Rangers Dunc McCallum
June 8, 1965	To Montreal Canadiens Earl Ingarfield Sr. Gord Labossiere; Dave McComb; Noel Price cash	To New York Rangers Cesare Maniago; Garry Peters
June 8, 1965	To Toronto Maple Leafs Andy Hebenton; Orland Kurtenbach; Pat Stapleton	To Boston Bruins Ron Stewart
June 8, 1965	To Montreal Canadiens Don Johns	To Chicago Black Hawks Bryan Watson
November 15, 1965	To Detroit Red Wings $15,000 cash	To Chicago Black Hawks Pat Hannigan
December 30, 1965	To Boston Bruins Pit Martin	To Detroit Red Wings Parker MacDonald
January 7, 1966	To Chicago Black Hawks rights to Lou Angotti	To New York Rangers cash other considerations^{1}
January 10, 1966	To Boston Bruins John McKenzie	To New York Rangers Reggie Fleming
February 16, 1966	To Boston Bruins Gary Doak; Bill Lesuk; Ron Murphy future considerations^{2} (Steve Atkinson)	To Detroit Red Wings Leo Boivin; Dean Prentice

Notes

1. Chicago Black Hawks allow the New York Rangers to assign Larry Mickey to the CHL without offering him to the Black Hawks first.
2. Trade completed on June 6, 1966.
