= NHL records =

The following articles contain the following lists of National Hockey League (NHL) records:

- List of NHL records (individual)
- List of NHL records (team)
- List of NHL All-Star Game records
- List of NHL statistical leaders
- List of NHL statistical leaders by country
