= List of NHL All-Star Game records =

Records in annual NHL game

This is a list of the records established in the playing of the annual NHL All-Star Game.

== Individual records ==
- Youngest player - Connor Bedard, 18 years and 171 days old, 2024
- Oldest player - Gordie Howe, 51 years, 10 months, 5 days, 1980

=== Career records ===
Skaters:

- Most games played – 23, Gordie Howe
- Most goals – 13, Wayne Gretzky, 18 games; Mario Lemieux, 10 games
- Most assists – 16, Joe Sakic, 12 games
- Most points – 25, Wayne Gretzky (13 goals, 12 assists), 18 games
- Most penalty minutes – 25, Gordie Howe, 23 games
- Most power-play goals – 6, Gordie Howe, 23 games

Goaltenders:

- Most games played – 13, Glenn Hall
- Most goals against – 27, Patrick Roy, 11 games
- Most minutes played – 540, Glenn Hall, 13 games
- Most consecutive wins – 4 Tim Thomas

=== Game records ===
- Most goals – 4, Wayne Gretzky, Campbell, 1983; Mario Lemieux, Wales, 1990; Vincent Damphousse, Campbell, 1991; Mike Gartner, Wales, 1993, Dany Heatley, East, 2003; John Tavares, Team Toews, 2015, Sidney Crosby, Metropolitan Division, 2019, Mikko Rantanen, Central Division, 2019, Gabriel Landeskog, Central Division, 2019,
- Most assists – 5, Mats Naslund, Wales, 1988, Roman Josi, Central Division, 2019, Ryan O’Reilly, Central Division, 2019,
- Most points – 8, Sidney Crosby (4 goals, 4 assists), Metropolitan, 2019
- Most points, 1 period – 4, Wayne Gretzky, Campbell, third period, 1983, four goals; Mike Gartner, Wales, first period, 1993 three goals, one assist; Adam Oates, Boston, Wales, first period, 1993, four assists
- Most goals, 1 period – 4, Wayne Gretzky, Campbell, third period, 1983
- Most assists, 1 period – 4, Adam Oates, Wales, first period, 1993
- Fastest goal from start of game – 12 seconds, Rick Nash, West, 2008
- Fastest goal from start of period – 12 seconds, Rick Nash, West, 2008, first period
- Fastest 2 goals, 1 player, from start of game: 3:37, Mike Gartner, Wales, 1993, at 3:15 and 3:37
- Fastest 2 goals – 8 seconds, Owen Nolan, Western, 1997. Scored at 18:54 and 19:02 of second period

== Team records ==
- Most goals, both teams, 1 game – 29, Team Toews 17, Team Foligno 12, 2015 at Columbus
- Fewest goals, both teams, 1 game – 2, NHL All-Stars 1, Montreal Canadiens 1, 1956 at Montreal; First Team All-Stars 1, Second Team All-Stars 1, 1952 at Detroit
- Most goals, 1 team, 1 game – 17, Team Toews 17, Team Foligno 12, 2015 at Columbus
- Fewest goals, 1 team, 1 game – 0, NHL All-Stars vs. Montreal, 1967 at Montreal
- Most shots, both teams, 1 game (since 1955) – 102, East 9 (56 shots), West 8 (46 shots), 1994 at New York
- Most shots, 1 team, 1 game (since 1955) – 56, East, 1994 at New York
- Fewest shots, both teams, 1 game (since 1955) – 52, Wales 3 (40 shots), Campbell 2 (12 shots), 1978 at Buffalo
- Fewest shots, 1 team, 1 game (since 1955) – 12, Campbell (2 goals), 1978 at Buffalo
- Fastest 2 goals, both teams, from start of game – 37 seconds, 1970 at St. Louis. Jacques Laperriere of East scored at 20 seconds and Dean Prentice of West scored at 37 seconds. Final: East 4, West 1
- Fastest 2 goals, 1 team, from start of game – 2:15, World, 1998 at Montreal. Teemu Selanne scored at 0:53 and Jaromir Jagr scored 2:15. Final: North America 8, World 7
- Fastest 2 goals, 1 team – :08, 1997 at San Jose. Owen Nolan scored at 18:54 and at 19:02 of second period for Western. Final: Eastern 11, Western 7
- Fastest 2 goals, both teams – :08, Western, 1997 at San Jose. Owen Nolan scored at 18:54 and 19:02 of second period. Final: Eastern 11, Western 7
- Fastest 3 goals, both teams – 0:48, Martin Havlat scored at 19:00 of third for West; Sheldon Souray scored at 19:25 of third for East; Dion Phaneuf scored at 19:48 for West, 2007 at Dallas. Final: Western 12, Eastern 9
- Fastest 4 goals, both teams – 2:24, 1997 at San Jose. Brendan Shanahan scored at 16:38 of second period for West; Dale Hawerchuk at 17:28 for East; Owen Nolan at 18:54 for West; Owen Nolan at 19:02 for West. Final: Eastern 11, Western 7
- Fastest 3 goals, 1 team – 1:08, Wales, 1993 at Montreal. Mike Gartner scored at 3:15 and 3:37 of first period, and Peter Bondra at 4:23
- Fastest 4 goals, 1 team – 4:17, Western, 2007 at Dallas. Brian Rolston scored at 8:30 of the second, Rick Nash scored at 10:40, Martin Havlat at 11:34 and Yanic Perreault at 12:47. Final: Western 12, Eastern 9
- Most goals, both teams, 1 period – 11, 2015 at Columbus. Second period - Team Toews (7), Team Foligno (4). Final: Team Toews 17, Team Foligno 12
- Most goals, one team, 1 period – 7 (Wales), first period, 1990 at Pittsburgh. Final: Wales 12, Campbell 7; (Team Toews), second period, 2015 at Columbus. Final: Team Toews 17, Team Foligno 12
- Most shots, both teams, 1 period – 39, 1994 at New York. Second period - West (21), East (18)
- Most shots, one team, 1 period – 23, World, third period, 2001 at Denver. Final: North America (14), World (12)
- Fewest shots, both teams, 1 period – 9, 1971 at Boston, third period, West (7), East (2). Final: West 2, East 1
- Fewest shots, one team, 1 period – 2, East, third period, 1971 at Boston. Final: West 2, East 1

== Sources ==
- "NHL.com - News: NHL All-Star Game Records - 22 January 2009". NHL.com. January 22, 2009. Archived from the original on February 9, 2010.
