= 17th National Hockey League All-Star Game =

Professional ice hockey exhibition game

17th NHL All-Star Game
	1	2	3	Total
All-Stars	2	0	1	3
Toronto Maple Leafs	2	0	1	3
- Date: October 5, 1963
- Arena: Maple Leaf Gardens
- City: Toronto
- MVP: Frank Mahovlich (Toronto)
- Attendance: 14,034

The 17th National Hockey League All-Star Game took place at Maple Leaf Gardens on October 5, 1963. The hometown Toronto Maple Leafs tied the NHL all-stars 3–3.

== The game ==
Frank Mahovlich scored twice and assisted once, each time giving Toronto a one-goal lead, but, each time, the All-Stars responded to even the score. Mahovlich was named MVP of the game. Gordie Howe became the all-time All-Star game points leader when he assisted on Henri Richard's goal in the first period. His ten points put him one up on Maurice Richard.

=== Game summary ===
	Toronto Maple Leafs	All-Stars
Final score	3	3
Head coach	Punch Imlach	Sid Abel (Detroit Red Wings)
Lineup	1 - G Johnny Bower; 4 - C Red Kelly; 7 - D Tim Horton; 8 - RW John MacMillan; 9 - LW Dick Duff; 10 - RW George Armstrong (captain); 11 - RW Bob Nevin; 12 - C Ron Stewart; 14 - C Dave Keon; 15 - C Bill Harris; 19 - D Kent Douglas; 20 - LW Bob Pulford; 21 - D Bobby Baun; 22 - D Larry Hillman; 23 - LW Eddie Shack; 24 - G Don Simmons; 25 - RW Ed Litzenberger; 26 - D Allan Stanley; 27 - LW Frank Mahovlich	First team All-Stars: 1 - G Glenn Hall (Chicago Black Hawks); 3 - D Pierre Pilote (Chicago Black Hawks); 9 - RW Gordie Howe (Detroit Red Wings); Second team All-Stars: 4 - D Elmer Vasko (Chicago Black Hawks); 7 - LW Bobby Hull (Chicago Black Hawks); 8 - RW Andy Bathgate (New York Rangers); 16 - C Henri Richard (Montreal Canadiens); 24 - G Terry Sawchuk (Detroit Red Wings); Other players: 2 - D Marcel Pronovost (Detroit Red Wings); 4 - C Jean Beliveau (Montreal Canadiens); 5 - RW Bernie Geoffrion (Montreal Canadiens); 6 - C Norm Ullman (Detroit Red Wings); 10 - C Alex Delvecchio (Detroit Red Wings); 11 - D Harry Howell (New York Rangers); 12 - LW Camille Henry (New York Rangers); 14 - RW Claude Provost (Montreal Canadiens); 15 - C Murray Oliver (Boston Bruins); 17 - LW Johnny Bucyk (Boston Bruins); 18 - LW Dean Prentice (Boston Bruins); 20 - D Tom Johnson (Boston Bruins)
Scoring summary	Mahovlich (Armstrong, Baun) 2:22 first; Mahovlich (Keon, Litzenberger) 12:11 first; Litzenberger (Mahovlich, Kelly) 2:56 third	Richard (Henry, Howe) 4:08 first (power-play); Hull (Geoffrion) 19:27 first (power-play); Pronovost (Bucyk, Oliver) 3:23 third
Penalties	Stanley 2:42 first; Duff 18:15 first; Horton 16:32 second; Baun 18:55 second; Horton 19:27 second; Stanley 17:04 third	Howell 15:18 first; Pronvost 11:47 second; Hull 19:27 second
Tie/Tie	Don Simmons	Terry Sawchuk

Shots on goal
Toronto	12	10	14	36
All-Stars	14	12	12	38

- Referee: Frank Udvari
- Linesmen: Matt Pavelich and Neil Armstrong
- Attendance: 14,034
