= Ron Ingram =

Canadian ice hockey player

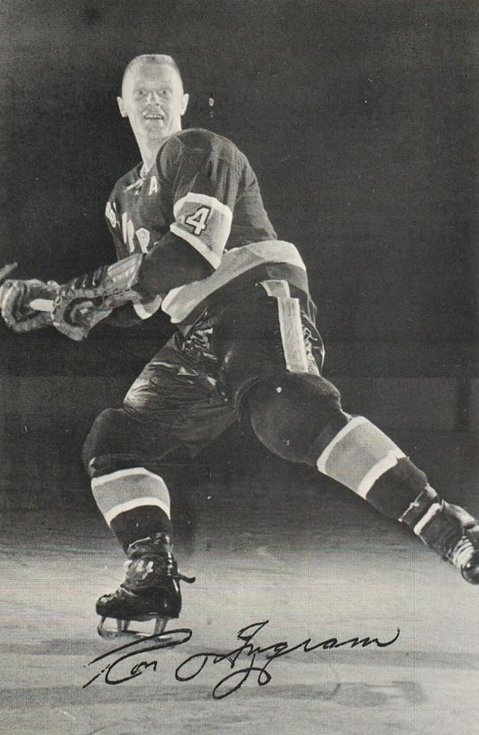
- Ingram in 1962 card
- Born: July 5, 1933 Toronto, Ontario, Canada
- Died: June 30, 1988 (aged 54)
- Height: 5 ft 11 in (180 cm)
- Weight: 185 lb (84 kg; 13 st 3 lb)
- Position: Defence
- Shot: Right
- Played for: New York Rangers; Detroit Red Wings; Chicago Black Hawks
- Playing career: 1953–1970

Ronald Walter Ingram (July 5, 1933 – June 30, 1988) was a Canadian ice hockey defenceman and coach. He played 114 games in the National Hockey League for the New York Rangers, Chicago Black Hawks, and Detroit Red Wings between 1956 and 1965. The rest of his career, which lasted from 1953 to 1970, was spent in various minor leagues. After his playing career Ingram worked as a coach in various leagues, including with the San Diego Mariners and Indianapolis Racers of the World Hockey Association from 1975 to 1978.

== Playing career ==
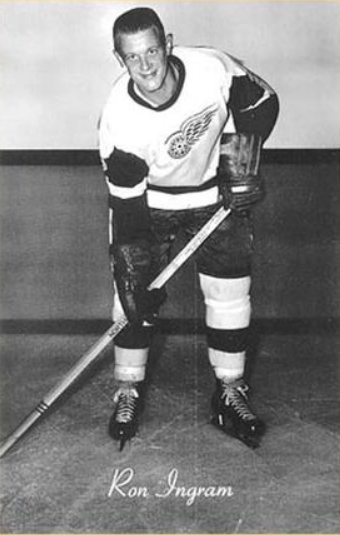
1963-64 photo of Ingram for Detroit Red Wings

Born in Toronto, Ontario, Ingram played junior hockey with the Toronto Marlboros then moved onto senior hockey's Stratford Indians. He played 114 games in the National Hockey League for the New York Rangers, Chicago Black Hawks, and Detroit Red Wings between 1956 and 1965, often as a reliable midseason call-up. During that time, he also played extensively in the American Hockey League for the Cleveland Barons and then the Buffalo Bisons.

Ingram spent the later portions of his career solely in the minors, first with the Baltimore Clippers and then again with the Bisons.

== Coaching career ==
After ending his playing career in 1970, Ingram became a coach, leading the Syracuse Blazers to 2 championships, one each in the Eastern Hockey League and the North American Hockey League. He also coached the San Diego Mariners, Indianapolis Racers, San Diego Hawks, and the US International University Gulls.

== Career statistics ==
=== Regular season and playoffs ===
			Regular season					Playoffs
Season	Team	League	GP	G	A	Pts	PIM	GP	G	A	Pts	PIM
1950–51	Toronto Marlboros	OHA	3	0	1	1	2	—	—	—	—	—
1951–52	Toronto Marlboros	OHA	40	8	15	23	27	5	1	0	1	6
1952–53	Toronto Marlboros	OHA	47	3	12	15	98	7	1	1	2	30
1953–54	Stratford Indians	OHA Sr	54	10	13	23	113	12	3	6	9	34
1954–55	Stratford Indians	OHA Sr	50	6	20	26	96	7	2	4	6	12
1955–56	Montreal Royals	QSHL	54	3	6	9	95	12	2	1	3	24
1956–57	Chicago Black Hawks	NHL	45	1	6	7	21	—	—	—	—	—
1956–57	Cleveland Barons	AHL	18	0	4	4	18	12	3	5	8	31
1957–58	Buffalo Bisons	AHL	63	5	10	15	92	—	—	—	—	—
1958–59	Buffalo Bisons	AHL	58	3	14	17	57	11	0	6	6	38
1959–60	Buffalo Bisons	AHL	71	5	18	23	131	—	—	—	—	—
1960–61	Buffalo Bisons	AHL	72	5	18	23	108	4	1	0	1	16
1961–62	Buffalo Bisons	AHL	57	6	18	24	113	11	0	4	4	7
1962–63	Buffalo Bisons	AHL	65	3	29	32	113	12	1	5	6	32
1962–63	Chicago Black Hawks	NHL	—	—	—	—	—	2	0	0	0	0
1963–64	Detroit Red Wings	NHL	50	3	6	9	50	—	—	—	—	—
1963–64	New York Rangers	NHL	16	1	3	4	8	—	—	—	—	—
1964–65	New York Rangers	NHL	3	0	0	0	2	—	—	—	—	—
1964–65	Baltimore Clippers	AHL	63	12	31	43	92	5	0	0	0	10
1965–66	Baltimore Clippers	AHL	72	10	34	44	132	—	—	—	—	—
1966–67	Baltimore Clippers	AHL	59	4	31	35	65	8	1	3	4	12
1967–68	Buffalo Bisons	AHL	71	9	32	41	102	5	2	4	6	12
1968–69	Buffalo Bisons	AHL	62	4	33	37	97	6	0	3	3	8
1969–70	Seattle Totems	WHL	72	5	23	28	48	—	—	—	—	—
AHL totals			731	66	272	338	1120	74	8	30	38	166
NHL totals			114	5	15	20	81	2	0	0	0	0

== WHA coaching record ==
Team	Year	Regular season						Postseason			
Team	Year	G	W	L	T	Pts	Finish	W	L	Win %	Result
SDM	1975–76	80	36	38	6	78	3rd in West	5	6	.455	Lost in quarterfinals (HOU)
SDM	1976–77	81	40	37	4	84	3rd in West	3	4	.429	Lost in quarterfinals (SDM)
IND	1977–78	51	16	31	4	36	(fired)	—	—	—	—
WHA totals		212	92	106	14			8	10	.444	
