= Barrie Meissner =

Canadian ice hockey player

- Born: July 26, 1946 (age 79) Unity, Saskatchewan, Canada
- Height: 5 ft 9 in (175 cm)
- Weight: 165 lb (75 kg; 11 st 11 lb)
- Position: Left wing
- Shot: Left
- Played for: Minnesota North Stars
- Playing career: 1967–1973

Barrie Michael Meissner (born July 26, 1946) is a Canadian former ice hockey player. He played 6 games in the National Hockey League with the Minnesota North Stars during the 1967–68 and 1968–69 seasons. The rest of his career, which lasted from 1967 to 1973, was spent in the minor leagues. Barrie is the brother of Dick Meissner.

== Career statistics ==
=== Regular season and playoffs ===
| | | | Regular season | | | | | Playoffs |
| Season | Team | League | GP | G | A | Pts | PIM | GP | G | A | Pts | PIM |
|---|---|---|---|---|---|---|---|---|---|---|---|---|
| 1963–64 | Regina Pats | SJHL | 6 | 0 | 0 | 0 | 4 | 1 | 0 | 0 | 0 | 2 |
| 1964–65 | Regina Pats | SJHL | 52 | 27 | 31 | 58 | 91 | 12 | 4 | 4 | 8 | 32 |
| 1964–65 | Regina Pats | M-Cup | — | — | — | — | — | 10 | 5 | 9 | 14 | 11 |
| 1965–66 | Regina Pats | SJHL | 60 | 47 | 56 | 103 | 148 | 5 | 1 | 5 | 6 | 8 |
| 1966–67 | Regina Pats | CMJHL | 53 | 35 | 44 | 79 | 78 | 15 | 12 | 17 | 29 | 34 |
| 1967–68 | Minnesota North Stars | NHL | 1 | 0 | 0 | 0 | 2 | — | — | — | — | — |
| 1967–68 | Memphis South Stars | CHL | 64 | 15 | 24 | 39 | 66 | — | — | — | — | — |
| 1968–69 | Minnesota North Stars | NHL | 5 | 0 | 1 | 1 | 2 | — | — | — | — | — |
| 1968–69 | Memphis South Stars | CHL | 67 | 27 | 26 | 53 | 80 | — | — | — | — | — |
| 1969–70 | Iowa Stars | CHL | 49 | 7 | 10 | 17 | 62 | 11 | 0 | 2 | 2 | 4 |
| 1970–71 | Cleveland Barons | AHL | 61 | 22 | 16 | 38 | 39 | 4 | 1 | 4 | 5 | 14 |
| 1971–72 | Cleveland Barons | AHL | 9 | 2 | 1 | 3 | 6 | — | — | — | — | — |
| 1971–72 | Seattle Totems | WHL | 7 | 0 | 2 | 2 | 6 | — | — | — | — | — |
| 1971–72 | Omaha Knights | CHL | 37 | 6 | 9 | 15 | 18 | — | — | — | — | — |
| 1972–73 | Cleveland/Jacksonville Barons | AHL | 68 | 20 | 25 | 45 | 71 | — | — | — | — | — |
| CHL totals | | | 217 | 55 | 69 | 124 | 226 | 11 | 0 | 2 | 2 | 4 |
| NHL totals | | | 6 | 0 | 1 | 1 | 4 | — | — | — | — | — |
