= 1959–60 NHL transactions =

The following is a list of all team-to-team transactions that have occurred in the National Hockey League (NHL) during the 1959–60 NHL season. It lists which team each player has been traded to and for which player(s) or other consideration(s), if applicable.

== Transactions ==
June 1, 1959 (exact date unknown)	To Montreal Canadiens cash	To Chicago Black Hawks Ian Cushenan
June 9, 1959	To Toronto Maple Leafs Frank Roggeveen; Johnny Wilson	To Detroit Red Wings Barry Cullen
June 9, 1959	To Montreal Canadiens cash	To Chicago Black Hawks Murray Balfour
August 25, 1959	To Boston Bruins Nick Mickoski	To Detroit Red Wings Jim Morrison
September 10, 1959	To Montreal Canadiens cash	To Chicago Black Hawks Eddie Johnston
September 10, 1959	To Montreal Canadiens cash	To Chicago Black Hawks Claude Pronovost
October 3, 1959	To Toronto Maple Leafs Hank Ciesla; Bill Kennedy future considerations	To New York Rangers Noel Price
November 1, 1959	To Toronto Maple Leafs $10,000 cash	To Montreal Canadiens Gary Collins
February 5, 1960^{1}	To Detroit Red Wings Bill Gadsby; Eddie Shack	To New York Rangers Red Kelly; Billy McNeill
February 10, 1960	To Toronto Maple Leafs Red Kelly	To Detroit Red Wings Marc Reaume
February 20, 1960	To Chicago Black Hawks loan of Ray Mikulan cash future considerations	To New York Rangers loan of Al Rollins

Notes

1. Trade voided on February 7, 1960, after Kelly and McNeill refused to report to the Rangers.
