= 1963–64 NHL season =

National Hockey League season

- League: National Hockey League
- Sport: Ice hockey
- Duration: October 8, 1963 – April 25, 1964
- Games: 70
- Teams: 6
- TV partner(s): CBC, SRC (Canada); None (United States)

Draft
- Top draft pick: Garry Monahan
- Picked by: Montreal Canadiens

Regular season
- Season champion: Montreal Canadiens
- Season MVP: Jean Beliveau (Canadiens)
- Top scorer: Stan Mikita (Black Hawks)

Stanley Cup
- Champions: Toronto Maple Leafs
- Runners-up: Detroit Red Wings

NHL seasons
- ← 1962–63 1964–65 →

The 1963–64 NHL season was the 47th season of the National Hockey League. Six teams played 70 games each. The Toronto Maple Leafs won their third consecutive Stanley Cup by defeating the Detroit Red Wings four games to three in the final series.

== Offseason ==
The biggest trade of the offseason took place in June 1963, with the New York Rangers and the Montreal Canadiens swapping starting goaltenders. Ranger Gump Worsley went to Montreal, along with Dave Balon, Leon Rochefort and minor-leaguer Len Ronson, for six-time Vezina Trophy winner Jacques Plante – whose relationship with Canadiens' coach Toe Blake had seriously soured – along with Don Marshall and Phil Goyette. Among other noteworthy transactions was the Boston Bruins drafting former Norris Trophy winner Tom Johnson from Montreal. Howie Young of the Red Wings, who'd likewise worn out his welcome in Detroit, was traded to the Chicago Black Hawks for goaltender Roger Crozier, who would make an immediate impact in Detroit. Billy Reay, the former coach of the Maple Leafs who had been coaching the Buffalo Bisons of the American Hockey League, was named coach of the Black Hawks, a position he would hold for a record thirteen seasons.

At the league meeting on June 5, the governors noted the death of William Northey, who had died in April at age 92, and established a memorial on behalf of Montreal Children's Hospital in Northey's name. It was announced at the league's October 4 meeting that Ron Andrews would replace Ken McKenzie, whose work as publisher and editor of The Hockey News was taking priority, as the NHL's director of publicity. Furthermore, the waiver rules were liberalized, so that a player not on the 20-man protected list submitted in June could be dispatched to the minors without clearing waivers.

The first NHL amateur draft was also held on June 5, at the Queen Elizabeth Hotel in Montreal, Quebec. The amateur draft was instituted by NHL President Clarence Campbell as a means of phasing out the sponsorship of amateur teams by the league's member clubs. The NHL wanted to create what Campbell called "a uniform opportunity for each team to acquire a star player". Prior to the creation of the draft, NHL teams would sponsor amateur teams and players, pre-empting other NHL clubs from acquiring new, young talent, and limiting amateur players' prospects in the NHL to the team which sponsored them. Garry Monahan was selected first overall by the Montreal Canadiens.

The 17th National Hockey League All-Star Game was held on October 5 in Toronto and resulted in a 3–3 tie between the Stanley Cup champion Maple Leafs and the NHL All-Stars. Frank Mahovlich, who scored on two of Toronto's goals and assisted on the third, was named Most Valuable Player. Stan Mikita of the Black Hawks, the First Team All-Star center, at the time unsigned, was not permitted to play. Unusually, six All-Stars were named from the Boston Bruins – John Bucyk, Leo Boivin, Murray Oliver, Dean Prentice, Doug Mohns and Tom Johnson – the most of any other team, although the Bruins had finished the 1963 season in last place.

== Regular season ==
Plante made his debut as a Ranger on October 9 against Chicago, losing 3–1 and being cut by an elbow from Black Hawk Johnny McKenzie. He fared no better four nights later in the home opener in Montreal against the Canadiens, losing 6–2 in the Forum while the fans both applauded and jeered their former goaltender.

While Mikita signed his contract in time for the start of the season, star defenceman Carl Brewer of the Maple Leafs was a holdout and claimed he was going to retire from hockey to attend the University of Toronto; contract terms were agreed upon by the end of October.

Montreal defeated the Red Wings 6–4 in Detroit, but the highlight of the game was Gordie Howe scoring his 544th goal to tie Maurice Richard's all-time career goal scoring mark and he drew a five-minute ovation from the capacity crowd.

Toronto defeated Montreal 6–3 at Maple Leaf Gardens on October 30 in a penalty-filled game; the most prominent fight featured Canadien Terry Harper and Maple Leaf Bob Pulford who drew fighting majors. There were two lasting consequences; Canadien goaltender Gump Worsley badly pulled his hamstring in the match and was eventually replaced by Charlie Hodge for the remainder of the season. Furthermore, on November 8, Maple Leaf Gardens became the first arena in the NHL to have separate penalty boxes installed.

The first penalty shot of the season was taken on November 3, with the Canadiens defeating the Rangers 5–3 in Madison Square Garden. Don Marshall, having been tripped by Jean Beliveau of Montreal, took the shot, but Canadien goaltender Charlie Hodge made the save. Nonetheless, the Rangers' management was not happy with the officiating of referee Vern Buffey, and called for the removal of referee-in-chief Carl Voss, a demand rejected by league president Clarence Campbell.

Detroit defeated the Canadiens 3–0 on November 10. Famously, two longtime career records were set in this match. Gordie Howe scored a shorthanded goal on Charlie Hodge for his 545th career goal, breaking Maurice Richard's record. Further, Detroit netminder Terry Sawchuk recorded his 94th career NHL shutout, tying him with George Hainsworth as the all-time NHL shutout leader. Howe would hold the all-time career goalscoring record for thirty seasons until broken by Wayne Gretzky in 1994, while Sawchuk would hold the all-time shutout record for forty-five seasons, when it was broken in 2009 by Martin Brodeur.

By late November it was clear to Ranger management that Doug Harvey had lost his form entirely and was given his release. He finished out the season in the AHL with the Quebec Aces.

Another career milestone fell on December 4, when Andy Hebenton of the Bruins broke the all-time career iron man streak, playing in his 581st consecutive game, to surpass Johnny Wilson's mark. He would extend the streak to 630 games, his last in the NHL, while continuing his career in the minors, where he would play ten more straight seasons without missing a match.

An unusual record fell on December 12, in a Montreal–New York match won 6–4 by the Canadiens. Dave Balon and Gilles Tremblay of Montreal and Camille Henry of the Rangers scored goals within a frame of eighteen seconds, setting a mark for the fastest three goals by two teams.

In a game on December 22 when Montreal exploded for five goals in nine minutes of the second period in a 6–1 win against Detroit, Canadien Jean Beliveau scored a goal to make him the highest scoring center in league history.

Rookie Detroit goaltender Roger Crozier, substituting for injured Terry Sawchuk, recorded his second shutout against Boston on January 7. Only 7,000 fans attended in Boston Garden to see the last place Bruins play, chanting "We shall overcome" to register their opinion on their team's performance.

On January 18, Terry Sawchuk broke George Hainsworth's NHL career shutout record with his 95th in a 2–0 win over Montreal. That same night, cellar dwelling Boston staggered the Maple Leafs 11–0 in Toronto, Andy Hebenton and Dean Prentice each scoring hat tricks.

On February 1, Montreal forward Bobby Rousseau scored five goals against Detroit in a 9–3 whipping of the Red Wings, one behind the league record for a single game and the first time five goals had been scored by a player in a single match in nearly a decade.

A trade rumored most of the season finally took place on February 22 when the New York Rangers traded Andy Bathgate – whom the Maple Leafs had coveted for some time – and Don McKenney to Toronto in exchange for Dick Duff, Bob Nevin, Arnie Brown, Bill Collins and Rod Seiling. Ranger fans did not like the deal and in the next game chants of "Muzz must go!" were heard, referring to Muzz Patrick, the Rangers' general manager. However, Bathgate – his days as a scoring star through – and McKenney both would be gone from Toronto by the end of the next season, while Seiling, Nevin and Brown would star for the Rangers for many years to come.

Several players scored their 200th goal in the season, with Camille Henry of the Rangers scoring his against Boston on October 20, Bobby Hull of the Black Hawks against the Rangers on December 11, Dean Prentice of the Bruins against the Hawks on December 12, as well as George Armstrong and Frank Mahovlich.

Goaltender Eddie Johnston played every minute of all 70 games for the Boston Bruins, the last time in NHL history a goaltender played every minute of every game.

The regular season title was secured by the Canadiens after Chicago, which had a substantial lead halfway through the season, played little better than .500 hockey the rest of the way; a Habs' 2–1 win against the Rangers on the road the last game of the season was needed to nose ahead of the Black Hawks, which had never to that date finished first in the league standings.

=== Final standings ===
National Hockey League
		GP	W	L	T	GF	GA	DIFF	Pts
1	Montreal Canadiens	70	36	21	13	209	167	+42	85
2	Chicago Black Hawks	70	36	22	12	218	169	+49	84
3	Toronto Maple Leafs	70	33	25	12	192	172	+20	78
4	Detroit Red Wings	70	30	29	11	191	204	−13	71
5	New York Rangers	70	22	38	10	186	242	−56	54
6	Boston Bruins	70	18	40	12	170	212	−42	48

== Playoffs ==
For the first time since the league began using the best-of-seven playoff format in 1939, all three series went the full seven games.

=== Playoff bracket ===
The top four teams in the league qualified for the playoffs. In the semifinals, the first-place team played the third-place team, while the second-place team faced the fourth-place team, with the winners advancing to the Stanley Cup Finals. In both rounds, teams competed in a best-of-seven series (scores in the bracket indicate the number of games won in each best-of-seven series).

Semifinals
1	Montreal	3
3	Toronto	4
2	Chicago	3
4	Detroit	4

Stanley Cup Finals
3	Toronto	4
4	Detroit	3

=== Semifinals ===
The playoffs had the same match-ups as the previous season in each round with the two Canadian teams, Toronto and Montreal, and two American teams, Detroit and Chicago meeting in Semifinals. As with the previous season, the Maple Leafs ousted the Canadiens and the Red Wings again defeated the Black Hawks.

==== (1) Montreal Canadiens vs. (3) Toronto Maple Leafs ====
March 26	Toronto Maple Leafs	0–2	Montreal Canadiens	Montreal Forum	Recap
No scoring		First period	06:53 – Bernie Geoffrion (1)
No scoring		Second period	09:32 – Ralph Backstrom (1)
No scoring		Third period	No scoring
Johnny Bower 32 saves / 34 shots		Goalie stats	Charlie Hodge 25 saves / 25 shots

March 28	Toronto Maple Leafs	2–1	Montreal Canadiens	Montreal Forum	Recap
Red Kelly (1) – 08:50; Frank Mahovlich (1) – 12:03		First period	No scoring
No scoring		Second period	15:29 – pp – Jean Beliveau (1)
No scoring		Third period	No scoring
Johnny Bower 22 saves / 23 shots		Goalie stats	Charlie Hodge 25 saves / 27 shots

March 31	Montreal Canadiens	3–2	Toronto Maple Leafs	Maple Leaf Gardens	Recap
Claude Provost (1) – 04:21		First period	03:40 – Bob Pulford (1)
No scoring		Second period	16:55 – Bob Pulford (2)
J.C. Tremblay (1) – 17:25; Henri Richard (1) – 19:35		Third period	No scoring
Charlie Hodge 28 saves / 30 shots		Goalie stats	Johnny Bower 26 saves / 29 shots

April 2	Montreal Canadiens	3–5	Toronto Maple Leafs	Maple Leaf Gardens	Recap
J.C. Tremblay (2) – 10:43		First period	02:59 – pp – Andy Bathgate (1); 16:34 – pp – George Armstrong (1)
Jean Beliveau (2) – 19:15		Second period	08:43 – pp – Red Kelly (2); 10:08 – Frank Mahovlich (2); 19:40 – pp – Frank Mahovlich (3)
Jacques Laperriere (1) – 00:26		Third period	No scoring
Charlie Hodge 34 saves / 39 shots		Goalie stats	Johnny Bower 31 saves / 34 shots

April 4	Toronto Maple Leafs	2–4	Montreal Canadiens	Montreal Forum	Recap
Don McKenney (1) – 05:37		First period	No scoring
Don McKenney (2) – 17:20		Second period	03:25 – Dave Balon (1); 12:03 – Claude Larose (1); 19:35 – sh – Bobby Rousseau (1)
No scoring		Third period	19:30 – en – Claude Provost (2)
Johnny Bower 24 saves / 27 shots		Goalie stats	Charlie Hodge 28 saves / 30 shots

April 7	Montreal Canadiens	0–3	Toronto Maple Leafs	Maple Leaf Gardens	Recap
No scoring		First period	No scoring
No scoring		Second period	08:59 – Don McKenney (3); 14:07 – Bob Baun (1)
No scoring		Third period	06:10 – Andy Bathgate (2)
Charlie Hodge 29 saves / 32 shots		Goalie stats	Johnny Bower 25 saves / 25 shots

April 9	Toronto Maple Leafs	3–1	Montreal Canadiens	Montreal Forum	Recap
Dave Keon (1) – 08:22; Dave Keon (2) – sh – 11:15		First period	No scoring
No scoring		Second period	No scoring
Dave Keon (3) – en – 19:49		Third period	07:27 – Ralph Backstrom (2)
Johnny Bower 38 saves / 39 shots		Goalie stats	Charlie Hodge 32 saves / 34 shots

Toronto won series 4–3

==== (2) Chicago Black Hawks vs. (4) Detroit Red Wings ====
March 26	Detroit Red Wings	1–4	Chicago Black Hawks	Chicago Stadium	Recap
Andre Pronovost (1) – 12:16		First period	13:06 – Ab McDonald (1)
No scoring		Second period	No scoring
No scoring		Third period	06:42 – Pierre Pilote (1); 08:27 – Murray Balfour (1); 16:23 – pp – Stan Mikita (1)
Terry Sawchuck 25 saves / 29 shots		Goalie stats	Glenn Hall 34 saves / 35 shots

March 29	Detroit Red Wings	5–4	Chicago Black Hawks	Chicago Stadium	Recap
Norm Ullman (1) – pp – 09:45; Norm Ullman (2) – 16:16		First period	No scoring
Andre Pronovost (2) – sh – 03:53; Gordie Howe (1) – 19:57		Second period	16:59 – Bill Hay (1); 17:06 – Bill Hay (2)
Norm Ullman (3) – 02:59		Third period	04:01 – Eric Nesterenko (1); 04:44 – Eric Nesterenko (2)
Terry Sawchuck 8 saves / 8 shots Bob Champoux 14 saves / 18 shots		Goalie stats	Glenn Hall 30 saves / 35 shots

March 31	Chicago Black Hawks	0–3	Detroit Red Wings	Olympia Stadium	Recap
No scoring		First period	05:10 – pp – Bruce MacGregor (1)
No scoring		Second period	No scoring
No scoring		Third period	04:51 – Paul Henderson (1); 17:43 – Alex Delvecchio (1)
Glenn Hall 26 saves / 29 shots		Goalie stats	Terry Sawchuck 26 saves / 26 shots

April 2	Chicago Black Hawks	3–2	OT	Detroit Red Wings	Olympia Stadium	Recap
Ab McDonald (1) – 08:04		First period		07:15 – pp – Parker MacDonald (1)
No scoring		Second period		01:19 – Gordie Howe (2)
Pierre Pilote (2) – 05:01		Third period		No scoring
Murray Balfour (2) – 08:21		First overtime period		No scoring
Glenn Hall 39 saves / 41 shots		Goalie stats		Terry Sawchuck 11 saves / 12 shots Roger Crozier 19 saves / 21 shots

April 5	Detroit Red Wings	2–3	Chicago Black Hawks	Chicago Stadium	Recap
No scoring		First period	02:52 – pp – Bobby Hull (1)
Gordie Howe (3) – pp – 05:48		Second period	No scoring
Andre Pronovost (3) – 05:21		Third period	05:25 – Kenny Wharram (1); 16:08 – Stan Mikita (2)
Roger Crozier 27 saves / 30 shots		Goalie stats	Glenn Hall 21 saves / 23 shots

April 7	Chicago Black Hawks	2–7	Detroit Red Wings	Olympia Stadium	Recap
Kenny Wharram (2) – pp – 16:31		First period	05:57 – pp – Norm Ullman (4)
Stan Mikita (3) – 15:45		Second period	01:40 – Gordie Howe (4); 07:00 – pp – Parker MacDonald (2); 13:06 – Andre Pronovost (4); 16:28 – Norm Ullman (5)
No scoring		Third period	03:53 – sh – Norm Ullman (6); 12:00 – pp – Bruce MacGregor (2)
Glenn Hall 20 saves / 25 shots Denis DeJordy 7 saves / 9 shots		Goalie stats	Terry Sawchuck 26 saves / 28 shots

April 9	Detroit Red Wings	4–2	Chicago Black Hawks	Chicago Stadium	Recap
Floyd Smith (1) – 01:55; Gordie Howe (5) – 05:06		First period	No scoring
Alex Delvecchio (2) – 11:32		Second period	Bill Hay (3) – pp – 11:09; Bobby Hull (2) – 14:42
Parker MacDonald (3) – pp – 08:02		Third period	No scoring
Terry Sawchuck 12 saves / 14 shots Roger Crozier 7 saves / 7 shots		Goalie stats	Glenn Hall 35 saves / 39 shots

Detroit won series 4–3

=== Stanley Cup Finals ===
April 11	Detroit Red Wings	2–3	Toronto Maple Leafs	Maple Leaf Gardens	Recap
Bruce MacGregor (3) – 04:31; Gordie Howe (6) – pp – 10:25		First period	04:44 – George Armstrong (2)
No scoring		Second period	No scoring
George Armstrong (3) – pp – 04:02; Bob Pulford (3) – sh – 19:58		Third period	No scoring
Terry Sawchuck 29 saves / 32 shots		Goalie stats	Johnny Bower 30 saves / 32 shots

April 14	Detroit Red Wings	4–3	OT	Toronto Maple Leafs	Maple Leaf Gardens	Recap
Norm Ullman (7) – 12:43		First period		04:41 – Allan Stanley (1)
Eddie Joyal (1) – 03:19; Floyd Smith (2) – pp – 16:15		Second period		No scoring
No scoring		Third period		11:57 – Red Kelly (3); 19:17 – Gerry Ehman (1)
Larry Jeffrey (1) – 07:52		First overtime period		No scoring
Terry Sawchuck 26 saves / 29 shots		Goalie stats		Johnny Bower 45 saves / 49 shots

April 16	Toronto Maple Leafs	3–4	Detroit Red Wings	Olympia Stadium	Recap
No scoring		First period	02:40 – Floyd Smith (3); 03:38 – Bruce MacGregor (4); 14:47 – pp – Floyd Smith (4)
Andy Bathgate (3) – pp – 04:16		Second period	No scoring
Dave Keon (4) – 07:34; Don McKenney (4) – 18:47		Third period	19:43 – Alex Delvecchio (3)
Johnny Bower 30 saves / 34 shots		Goalie stats	Terry Sawchuck 31 saves / 34 shots

April 18	Toronto Maple Leafs	4–2	Detroit Red Wings	Olympia Stadium	Recap
Dave Keon (5) – 05:45		First period	No scoring
Dave Keon (6) – pp – 16:09		Second period	05:57 – Bruce MacGregor (5); 13:05 – pp – Gordie Howe (7)
Andy Bathgate (4) – 10:55; Frank Mahovlich (4) – 18:09		Third period	No scoring
Johnny Bower 25 saves / 27 shots		Goalie stats	Terry Sawchuck 31 saves / 35 shots

April 21	Detroit Red Wings	2–1	Toronto Maple Leafs	Maple Leaf Gardens	Recap
Gordie Howe (8) – 10:52		First period	No scoring
No scoring		Second period	No scoring
Eddie Joyal (2) – 07:50		Third period	14:57 – pp – George Armstrong (4)
Terry Sawchuck 33 saves / 34 shots		Goalie stats	Johnny Bower 32 saves / 34 shots

April 23	Toronto Maple Leafs	4–3	OT	Detroit Red Wings	Olympia Stadium	Recap
Bob Pulford (4) – sh – 17:01		First period		No scoring
Bob Pulford (5) – 14:36; Billy Harris (1) – 17:48		Second period		04:20 – Paul Henderson (2); 10:56 – pp – Pit Martin (1); 15:56 – Gordie Howe (9)
No scoring		Third period		No scoring
Bob Baun (2) – 01:43		First overtime period		No scoring
Johnny Bower 38 saves / 41 shots		Goalie stats		Terry Sawchuck 32 saves / 36 shots

April 25	Detroit Red Wings	0–4	Toronto Maple Leafs	Maple Leaf Gardens	Recap
No scoring		First period	03:04 – Andy Bathgate (5)
No scoring		Second period	No scoring
No scoring		Third period	04:26 – Dave Keon (7); 05:53 – Red Kelly (4); 15:26 – George Armstrong (5)
Terry Sawchuck 33 saves / 37 shots		Goalie stats	Johnny Bower 33 saves / 33 shots

Toronto won series 4–3

== Awards ==
1963–64 NHL awards
Prince of Wales Trophy: (Regular season champion)	Montreal Canadiens
Art Ross Trophy: (Top scorer)	Stan Mikita, Chicago Black Hawks
Calder Memorial Trophy: (Best first-year player)	Jacques Laperriere, Montreal Canadiens
Hart Memorial Trophy: (Most valuable player)	Jean Beliveau, Montreal Canadiens
James Norris Memorial Trophy: (Best defenceman)	Pierre Pilote, Chicago Black Hawks
Lady Byng Memorial Trophy: (Excellence and sportsmanship)	Ken Wharram, Chicago Black Hawks
Vezina Trophy: (Goaltender of team with the best goals-against average)	Charlie Hodge, Montreal Canadiens

=== All-Star teams ===
First team	Position	Second team
Glenn Hall, Chicago Black Hawks	G	Charlie Hodge, Montreal Canadiens
Pierre Pilote, Chicago Black Hawks	D	Moose Vasko, Chicago Black Hawks
Tim Horton, Toronto Maple Leafs	D	Jacques Laperriere, Montreal Canadiens
Stan Mikita, Chicago Black Hawks	C	Jean Beliveau, Montreal Canadiens
Kenny Wharram, Chicago Black Hawks	RW	Gordie Howe, Detroit Red Wings
Bobby Hull, Chicago Black Hawks	LW	Frank Mahovlich, Toronto Maple Leafs

== Player statistics ==
=== Scoring leaders ===
Note: GP = Games played, G = Goals, A = Assists, Pts = Points, PIM = Penalties in minutes

Player	Team	GP	G	A	Pts	PIM
Stan Mikita	Chicago Black Hawks	70	39	50	89	146
Bobby Hull	Chicago Black Hawks	70	43	44	87	50
Jean Beliveau	Montreal Canadiens	68	28	50	78	42
Andy Bathgate	New York Rangers / Toronto Maple Leafs	71	19	58	77	34
Gordie Howe	Detroit Red Wings	69	26	47	73	70
Kenny Wharram	Chicago Black Hawks	70	39	32	71	18
Murray Oliver	Boston Bruins	70	24	44	68	41
Phil Goyette	New York Rangers	67	24	41	65	15
Rod Gilbert	New York Rangers	70	24	40	64	62
Dave Keon	Toronto Maple Leafs	70	23	37	60	6

=== Leading goaltenders ===
Note: GP = Games played; Min = Minutes played; GA = Goals against; GAA = Goals against average; W = Wins; L = Losses; T = Ties; SO = Shutouts

Player	Team	GP	MIN	GA	GAA	W	L	T	SO
Johnny Bower	Toronto Maple Leafs	51	3009	106	2.11	24	16	11	5
Charlie Hodge	Montreal Canadiens	62	3720	140	2.26	33	18	11	8
Glenn Hall	Chicago Black Hawks	65	3860	148	2.30	34	19	11	7
Terry Sawchuk	Detroit Red Wings	53	3140	138	2.64	25	20	7	5
Eddie Johnston	Boston Bruins	70	4200	211	3.01	18	40	12	6
Don Simmons	Toronto Maple Leafs	21	1191	63	3.17	9	9	1	3
Jacques Plante	N.Y. Rangers	65	3900	220	3.38	22	36	7	3
Roger Crozier	Detroit Red Wings	15	900	51	3.40	5	6	4	2

== Coaches ==
- Boston Bruins: Milt Schmidt
- Chicago Black Hawks: Billy Reay
- Detroit Red Wings: Sid Abel
- Montreal Canadiens: Toe Blake
- New York Rangers: Red Sullivan
- Toronto Maple Leafs: Punch Imlach

== Debuts ==
The following is a list of players of note who played their first NHL game in 1963–64 (listed with their first team):

- Gary Dornhoefer, Boston Bruins
- Ted Irvine, Boston Bruins
- Phil Esposito, Chicago Black Hawks
- Roger Crozier, Detroit Red Wings
- Ted Harris, Montreal Canadiens
- John Ferguson, Montreal Canadiens
- Yvan Cournoyer, Montreal Canadiens
- Jimmy Roberts, Montreal Canadiens
- Gilles Villemure, New York Rangers
- Jim Pappin, Toronto Maple Leafs
- Ron Ellis, Toronto Maple Leafs

== Last games ==
The following is a list of players of note that played their last game in the NHL in 1963–64 (listed with their last team):

- Andy Hebenton, Boston Bruins
- Jerry Toppazzini, Boston Bruins
- Ed Litzenberger, Toronto Maple Leafs

== Broadcasting ==
Hockey Night in Canada on CBC Television televised Saturday night regular season games and Stanley Cup playoff games. Games were not broadcast in their entirety until the 1968–69 season, and were typically joined in progress, while the radio version of HNIC aired games in their entirety.

This was the fourth consecutive season that the NHL did not have an American national broadcaster until the 1965–66 season.

== See also ==
- 1963–64 NHL transactions
- List of Stanley Cup champions
- NHL amateur draft
- 1963 NHL amateur draft
- National Hockey League All-Star Game
- Ice hockey at the 1964 Winter Olympics
- 1963 in sports
- 1964 in sports
