= Dick Meissner =

Canadian ice hockey player (1940-2002)

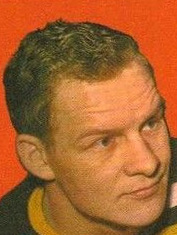
- Born: January 6, 1940 Kindersley, Saskatchewan, Canada
- Died: May 7, 2002 (aged 62) unknown
- Height: 5 ft 11 in (180 cm)
- Weight: 200 lb (91 kg; 14 st 4 lb)
- Position: Right wing
- Shot: Right
- Played for: Boston Bruins; New York Rangers
- Playing career: 1956–1975

Richard Donald Meissner (January 6, 1940 – May 7, 2002) was a Canadian professional ice hockey forward who played 171 games in the National Hockey League for the Boston Bruins and New York Rangers between 1959 and 1965. The rest of his career, which lasted from 1956 to 1975, was spent in various minor leagues. Dick is the brother of Barrie Meissner.

== Playing career ==
Meissner played junior hockey with the Humboldt Indians, Estevan Bruins and Flin Flon Bombers from 1956 to 1959. In 1959, Meissner turned professional with the Boston Bruins, and alternately played with the Bruins and minor league teams until 1963, when he was traded to the New York Rangers. Meissner played in the 1963–64 and 1964–65 seasons with the Rangers and its farm teams. Meissner continued solely in the minor leagues after that until 1972. Meissner returned in 1974 with the Portland Buckaroos, but only played part of the season, and retired afterward.

== Career statistics ==
=== Regular season and playoffs ===
			Regular season					Playoffs
Season	Team	League	GP	G	A	Pts	PIM	GP	G	A	Pts	PIM
1956–57	Humboldt Indians	SJHL	51	9	13	22	8	4	0	1	1	0
1957–58	Estevan Bruins	SJHL	51	49	24	73	9	6	2	5	7	0
1958–59	Estevan Bruins	SJHL	46	46	43	89	37	14	18	14	32	9
1958–59	Estevan Bruins	M-Cup	—	—	—	—	—	6	2	2	4	2
1959–60	Boston Bruins	NHL	60	5	6	11	22	—	—	—	—	—
1960–61	Boston Bruins	NHL	9	0	1	1	2	—	—	—	—	—
1960–61	Kingston Frontenacs	EPHL	58	26	22	48	19	5	1	2	3	0
1961–62	Boston Bruins	NHL	66	3	3	6	13	—	—	—	—	—
1962–63	Hershey Bears	AHL	70	28	26	54	18	15	8	6	14	10
1963–64	New York Rangers	NHL	70	28	26	54	18	15	8	6	14	10
1963–64	Baltimore Clippers	AHL	12	5	5	10	4	—	—	—	—	—
1964–65	New York Rangers	NHL	1	0	0	0	0	—	—	—	—	—
1964–65	Baltimore Clippers	AHL	69	35	42	77	21	5	3	1	4	0
1965–66	St. Louis Braves	CHL	62	27	12	39	23	5	2	1	3	0
1966–67	Los Angeles Blades	WHL	72	39	42	81	6	—	—	—	—	—
1967–68	Portland Buckaroos	WHL	6	1	1	2	2	—	—	—	—	—
1967–68	Baltimore Clippers	AHL	61	29	25	54	9	—	—	—	—	—
1968–69	Providence Reds	AHL	73	16	22	38	37	9	5	8	13	9
1969–70	Providence Reds	AHL	63	19	23	42	20	—	—	—	—	—
1970–71	Providence Reds	AHL	5	0	2	2	2	—	—	—	—	—
1971–72	Phoenix Roadrunners	WHL	14	4	4	8	11	—	—	—	—	—
1971–72	Seattle Totems	WHL	9	2	3	5	0	—	—	—	—	—
1974–75	Portland Buckaroos	WIHL	19	3	8	11	19	—	—	—	—	—
AHL totals			353	132	145	277	111	29	16	15	31	19
NHL totals			171	11	15	26	37	—	—	—	—	—
