= Arnie Brown =

Canadian ice hockey player (1942–2019)

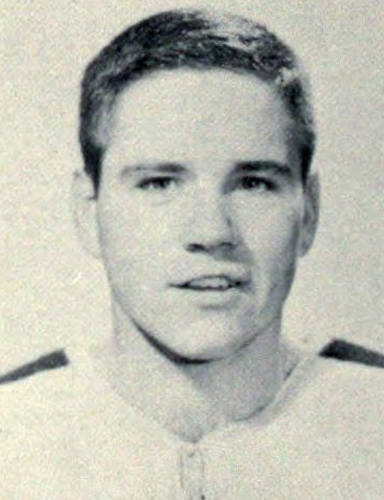
- Brown at St. Michael's, c. 1961
- Born: January 28, 1942 Apsley, Ontario, Canada
- Died: July 26, 2019 (aged 77) Lake Orion, Michigan, U.S.
- Height: 5 ft 11 in (180 cm)
- Weight: 185 lb (84 kg; 13 st 3 lb)
- Position: Defence
- Shot: Left
- Played for: Toronto Maple Leafs; New York Rangers; Detroit Red Wings; New York Islanders; Atlanta Flames; Michigan Stags; Baltimore Blades; Vancouver Blazers
- Playing career: 1961–1975

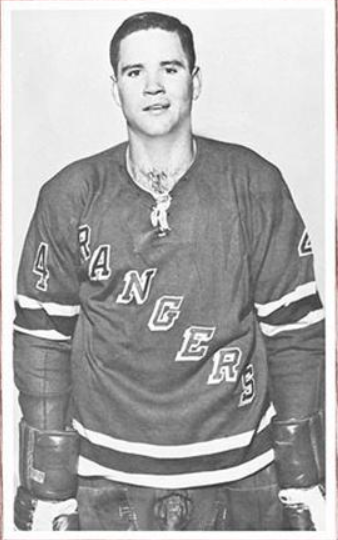
Mid 1960s (1964-67) photo of Brown for New York Rangers

Stewart Arnold Brown (January 28, 1942 – July 26, 2019) was a professional ice hockey defenceman in the National Hockey League (NHL), who played for the Toronto Maple Leafs, New York Rangers, Detroit Red Wings, New York Islanders, and Atlanta Flames. After one season in the World Hockey Association (WHA), with the Vancouver Blazers, Michigan Stags and Baltimore Blades, Brown retired in 1975.

In the 2009 book 100 Ranger Greats, the authors ranked Brown at No. 93 all-time of the 901 New York Rangers who had played during the team’s first 82 seasons.

Brown died on July 26, 2019, at the age of 77.

== Career statistics ==
=== Regular season and playoffs ===
			Regular season					Playoffs
Season	Team	League	GP	G	A	Pts	PIM	GP	G	A	Pts	PIM
1959–60	Toronto St. Michael's Majors	OHA	48	2	5	7	112	10	0	2	2	14
1960–61	Toronto St. Michael's Majors	OHA	47	7	11	18	110	20	6	9	15	60
1961–62	Toronto Marlboros	OHA	19	7	10	17	70	7	0	8	8	23
1961–62	Toronto Maple Leafs	NHL	2	0	0	0	0	—	—	—	—	—
1961–62	Rochester Americans	AHL	3	0	3	3	2	—	—	—	—	—
1962–63	Rochester Americans	AHL	71	4	24	28	143	2	0	0	0	6
1963–64	Toronto Maple Leafs	NHL	4	0	0	0	6	—	—	—	—	—
1963–64	Rochester Americans	AHL	47	4	23	27	119	—	—	—	—	—
1963–64	Baltimore Clippers	AHL	11	0	3	3	8	—	—	—	—	—
1964–65	New York Rangers	NHL	58	1	11	12	145	—	—	—	—	—
1965–66	New York Rangers	NHL	64	1	7	8	106	—	—	—	—	—
1966–67	New York Rangers	NHL	69	2	10	12	61	4	0	0	0	6
1967–68	New York Rangers	NHL	74	1	25	26	83	6	0	1	1	8
1968–69	New York Rangers	NHL	74	10	12	22	48	4	0	1	1	0
1969–70	New York Rangers	NHL	73	15	21	36	78	4	0	4	4	9
1970–71	New York Rangers	NHL	48	3	12	15	24	—	—	—	—	—
1970–71	Detroit Red Wings	NHL	27	2	6	8	30	—	—	—	—	—
1971–72	Detroit Red Wings	NHL	77	2	23	25	84	—	—	—	—	—
1972–73	New York Islanders	NHL	48	4	8	12	27	—	—	—	—	—
1972–73	Atlanta Flames	NHL	15	1	0	1	17	—	—	—	—	—
1973–74	Atlanta Flames	NHL	48	2	6	8	29	4	0	0	0	0
1974–75	Michigan Stags/Baltimore Blades	WHA	50	3	4	7	27	—	—	—	—	—
1974–75	Vancouver Blazers	WHA	10	0	1	1	13	—	—	—	—	—
WHA totals			60	3	5	8	40	—	—	—	—	—
NHL totals			681	44	141	185	738	22	0	6	6	23
