= Dean Prentice =

Canadian ice hockey player (1932–2019)

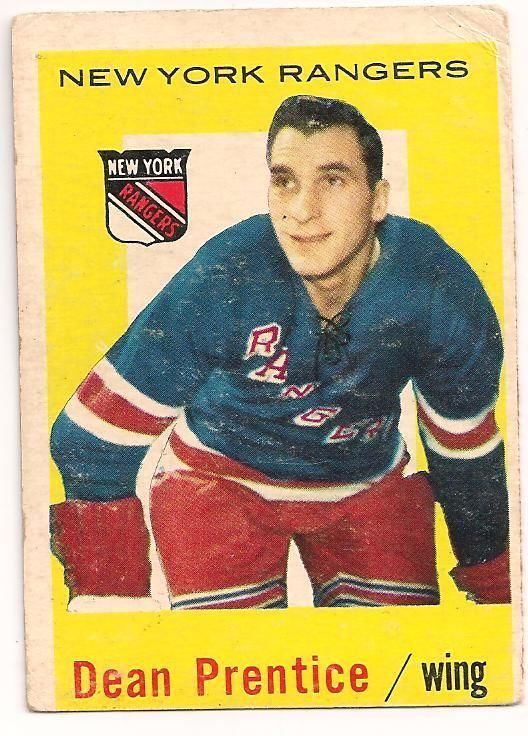
- Born: October 5, 1932 Schumacher, Ontario, Canada
- Died: November 2, 2019 (aged 87) Cambridge, Ontario, Canada
- Height: 5 ft 11 in (180 cm)
- Weight: 165 lb (75 kg; 11 st 11 lb)
- Position: Left wing
- Shot: Left
- Played for: New York Rangers; Boston Bruins; Detroit Red Wings; Pittsburgh Penguins; Minnesota North Stars
- Playing career: 1952–1974

Dean Sutherland Prentice (October 5, 1932 – November 2, 2019) was a Canadian professional ice hockey left winger who played in the National Hockey League (NHL) for 22 seasons between 1952–53 and 1973–74. He had 10 NHL seasons with 20 or more goals. Over his NHL career, Prentice played for the New York Rangers, Boston Bruins, Detroit Red Wings, Pittsburgh Penguins, and Minnesota North Stars.

== Early life ==
Prentice helped the Guelph Biltmores win the 1952 Memorial Cup. At the time the Mad Hatters were the New York Rangers' farm team, and Prentice made the jump to the parent club the following season.

== Playing career ==
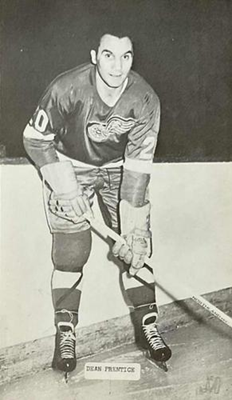
1960s photo of Dean Prentice for Detroit Red Wings

In the 1950s, Prentice, while on the NY Rangers, skated on a line with Andy Bathgate and Larry Popein. Prentice was 10th in the league with 358 points (163 goals)from 1955-56 through 1961-62.

On February 4, 1963, Prentice was traded to the Bruins for Don McKenney and Dick Meissner.

On December 27, 1964, in Chicago Stadium, Prentice, while playing for the Bruins, was hauled down on a breakaway by Stan Mikita. Initially knocked unconscious, Prentice came to and took the awarded penalty shot, scoring on Blackhawks' goaltender Denis DeJordy. Back on the bench, Prentice was unable to leave the bench for his next shift when his back and legs locked up. After being stretchered off and undergoing x-rays, it was revealed that Prentice had scored with a broken back.

After the Rangers and Bruins failed to make the playoffs each season Prentice was there, he finally appeared in the Stanley Cup playoffs after a trade in 1966 sent him to Detroit. In his first season with Detroit, the Red Wings won the first two games of the 1966 Stanley Cup Finals, before losing four straight. But it was Prentice who put up 10 points in 12 games during the Red Wings 1966 playoff run.

The Penguins claimed Prentice from Detroit in the 1969 NHL Intra-League Draft.

In the 1970 NHL All-Star Game in St. Louis, Prentice scored the only goal for the West Division team in their 4-1 loss to the East Division. He was 37 years old at the time.

In October 1971 Prentice was traded from Pittsburgh to Minnesota for cash.

Prentice played 1378 career NHL games, scoring 391 goals and 469 assists for 860 points.

In 1976, Prentice staged a comeback of sorts, coming out of retirement at 44 years old by suiting up for the Traverse City Bays of the United States Hockey League for 28 games.

== Coaching career ==
In 1974-75, he became the head coach of the AHL's New Haven Nighthawks. In 1976-77, he became a player-coach of the Traverse City Bays of the USHL.

From 1980-82, Prentice served as an assistant coach with the University of Guelph.

== Personal life ==
Prentice and his wife June had two daughters, Kelly and Kerry.

His brother, Eric, played five games for the Toronto Maple Leafs during the 1943–44 NHL season. Former Alberta premier Jim Prentice was Dean's nephew (and Eric's son). Prentice died on November 2, 2019, at the age of 87. Grandsons Phil and Dan Brewer were also hockey players, with Phil reaching the ECHL and AHL level.

Following his career, Prentice moved back to Ontario in 1977 and became Ayr's director of recreation.

== Legacy ==
In the 2009 book 100 Ranger Greats, the authors ranked Prentice at No. 37 all-time of the 901 New York Rangers who had played during the team's first 82 seasons.

== Career statistics ==
			Regular season					Playoffs
Season	Team	League	GP	G	A	Pts	PIM	GP	G	A	Pts	PIM
1950–51	Guelph Biltmores	OHA-Jr.	51	20	16	36	26	4	1	1	2	15
1951–52	Guelph Biltmores	OHA-Jr.	51	48	27	75	68	23	21	10	31	28
1951–52	Guelph Biltmores	M-Cup	—	—	—	—	—	12	13	5	18	14
1952–53	Guelph Biltmores	OHA-Jr.	5	1	1	2	16	—	—	—	—	—
1952–53	New York Rangers	NHL	55	6	3	9	20	—	—	—	—	—
1953–54	New York Rangers	NHL	52	4	13	17	18	—	—	—	—	—
1954–55	New York Rangers	NHL	70	16	15	31	20	—	—	—	—	—
1955–56	New York Rangers	NHL	70	24	18	42	44	5	1	0	1	2
1956–57	New York Rangers	NHL	69	19	23	42	38	5	0	2	2	4
1957–58	New York Rangers	NHL	38	13	9	22	14	6	1	3	4	4
1958–59	New York Rangers	NHL	70	17	33	50	11	—	—	—	—	—
1959–60	New York Rangers	NHL	70	32	34	66	43	—	—	—	—	—
1960–61	New York Rangers	NHL	56	20	25	45	17	—	—	—	—	—
1961–62	New York Rangers	NHL	68	22	38	60	20	3	0	2	2	0
1962–63	New York Rangers	NHL	49	13	25	38	18	—	—	—	—	—
1962–63	Boston Bruins	NHL	19	6	9	15	4	—	—	—	—	—
1963–64	Boston Bruins	NHL	70	23	16	39	37	—	—	—	—	—
1964–65	Boston Bruins	NHL	31	14	9	23	12	—	—	—	—	—
1965–66	Boston Bruins	NHL	50	7	22	29	10	—	—	—	—	—
1965–66	Detroit Red Wings	NHL	19	6	9	15	8	12	5	5	10	4
1966–67	Detroit Red Wings	NHL	68	23	22	45	18	—	—	—	—	—
1967–68	Detroit Red Wings	NHL	69	17	38	55	42	—	—	—	—	—
1968–69	Detroit Red Wings	NHL	74	14	20	34	18	—	—	—	—	—
1969–70	Pittsburgh Penguins	NHL	75	26	25	51	14	10	2	5	7	8
1970–71	Pittsburgh Penguins	NHL	69	21	17	38	18	—	—	—	—	—
1971–72	Minnesota North Stars	NHL	71	20	27	47	14	7	3	0	3	0
1972–73	Minnesota North Stars	NHL	73	26	16	42	22	6	1	0	1	16
1973–74	Minnesota North Stars	NHL	24	2	3	5	4	—	—	—	—	—
1976–77	Traverse City Bays	USHL	28	5	22	27	20	—	—	—	—	—
NHL totals			1,378	391	469	860	484	54	13	17	30	38

== Awards ==
Prentice was named to the NHL Second All-Star Team in 1960 after finishing with NHL career highs in goals (32) and points (66). He appeared the NHL All-Star Game five times (1957, 1961, 1963, 1970), the final time at age 37.

== See also ==
- List of NHL players with 1,000 games played
