= Dave Balon =

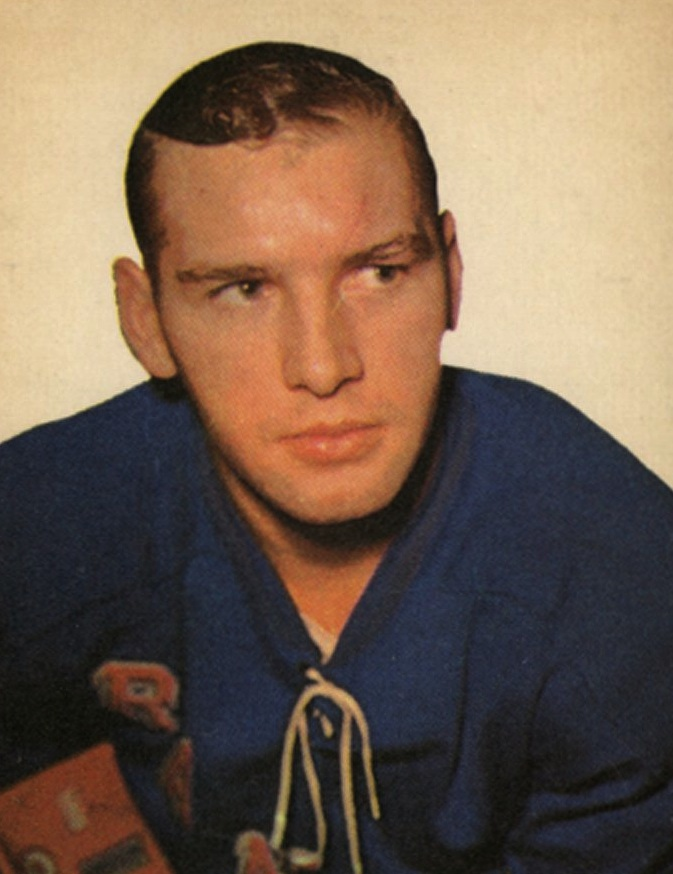
- Born: August 2, 1938 Wakaw, Saskatchewan, Canada
- Died: May 29, 2007 (aged 68) Prince Albert, Saskatchewan, Canada
- Height: 5 ft 10 in (178 cm)
- Weight: 180 lb (82 kg; 12 st 12 lb)
- Position: Left wing
- Shot: Left
- Played for: New York Rangers; Montreal Canadiens; Minnesota North Stars; Vancouver Canucks; Quebec Nordiques
- Playing career: 1959–1974

David Alexander Balon (August 2, 1938 – May 29, 2007) was a Canadian professional ice hockey player and coach. Balon played 14 seasons in the National Hockey League between 1959 and 1973 along with nine games in the World Hockey Association (WHA) before multiple sclerosis led to his retirement.

== Playing career ==
Balon played his junior hockey for the Prince Albert Mintos of the SJHL before turning pro in 1958 and joining the New York Rangers farm system. He would make his NHL debut in the 1959–60 season with a three-game callup to the Rangers. Over the next two years, he would be a frequent call-up, seeing 43 more games of NHL action and recording 5 goals and 18 points. In 1962–63, he finally established himself as a full-time member of the Rangers, appearing in all 70 games and recording 11 goals and 24 points.

For the 1963–64 season, Balon was dealt to the Montreal Canadiens in 7-player trade involving Hall of Fame goalies Jacques Plante and Gump Worsley. He would have an outstanding season in Montreal, finishing with 24 goals, good for 3rd on the team, and 42 points. He would have another solid season in 1964–65, posting 41 points and then helping Montreal to the Stanley Cup Championship. Balon won his second Stanley Cup in 1966 and assisted in Henri Richard's Cup-winning goal in overtime.

In 1967, Balon was exposed by Montreal in the Expansion Draft and selected by the Minnesota North Stars. He would return to form with the North Stars, posting career highs in assists (32) and points (47), and was selected to play in the NHL All-Star Game (he played in two previous All-Star games for Montreal in a format where the league champion played a team of All-Stars, but this was his first 'true' selection). He had especially strong playoffs, scoring 13 points in 14 games and leading the NHL in playoff assists with 9.

Following the season, Balon would be dealt back to his first NHL team, the New York Rangers, in exchange for three players. Balon's first year back in New York was sub-par by his standards, as he finished with 10 goals and 31 points. However, he would establish himself as an elite player in 1969–70, as he finished 7th in the league in goals with 33 and 10th in overall scoring with 70 points. He followed that up with another stellar season in 1970–71, as he bettered his career high with 36 goals (again top-10 in the league), and was voted the 'Most Popular Ranger' on a team with 5 future Hall-of-Famers. His offensive accomplishments were even more impressive in that he was also one of the team's top defensive forwards often assigned to check opposition stars.

After a so-so start to the 1971–72 season, Balon was dealt to the Vancouver Canucks. He would finish the season with respectable totals of 23 goals and 47 points but wasn't the player he was in New York. As it turned out, he was in the early stages of multiple sclerosis, an illness that wouldn't be diagnosed until after his playing career.

In 1972–73, Balon had a shocking loss of form as the illness took its toll on his play. A top-10 offensive player in the league just two seasons prior, Balon slumped to just 3 goals and 5 points in 57 games. Sadly, Balon would be treated harshly by media and fans in Vancouver, who didn't realize the nature of his condition and attributed his suddenly sluggish play to a lack of effort or just his being 'washed-up'.

Balon would have one more go at pro hockey in the 1973–74 season, suiting up for the Quebec Nordiques of the WHA, but was forced to retire after 7 games.

== Post-hockey career ==
Balon finished his NHL career with 192 goals and 222 assists for 414 points in 776 career games, along with 607 penalty minutes. He played in four All-Star games and won two Stanley Cups.

After his retirement, Balon received a proper diagnosis of his condition. He turned to coaching and spent several seasons as head coach of the Humboldt Broncos of the SJHL.

Balon fell on hard times during the 1980s and 1990s. As his condition worsened, he was left unable to work and forced to live off his relatively small NHL pension. Ultimately, he received assistance from the NHLPA and various alumni organizations thereafter until his death from multiple sclerosis, a diagnosis he had for more than 30 years.

== Awards and achievements ==
- 1965 NHL All Star (Montreal)
- 1967 NHL All Star (Montreal)
- 1968 NHL All Star (Minnesota)
- 1971 NHL All Star (NYR)
- NHL leader in playoff assists (9, 1968)
- Led New York Rangers in goals (1969–70, 1970–71)

== Career statistics ==
=== Regular season and playoffs ===
| | | | Regular season | | | | | Playoffs |
| Season | Team | League | GP | G | A | Pts | PIM | GP | G | A | Pts | PIM |
|---|---|---|---|---|---|---|---|---|---|---|---|---|
| 1955–56 | Prince Albert Mintos | SJHL | 14 | 5 | 5 | 10 | 14 | 12 | 3 | 2 | 5 | 14 |
| 1956–57 | Prince Albert Mintos | SJHL | 40 | 29 | 30 | 59 | 112 | 13 | 5 | 5 | 10 | 15 |
| 1957–58 | Prince Albert Mintos | SJHL | 51 | 35 | 44 | 79 | 113 | 6 | 3 | 1 | 4 | 10 |
| 1957–58 | Vancouver Canucks | WHL | 4 | 0 | 2 | 2 | 8 | — | — | — | — | — |
| 1958–59 | Saskatoon Quakers | WHL | 57 | 12 | 25 | 37 | 84 | — | — | — | — | — |
| 1959–60 | Vancouver Canucks | WHL | 3 | 1 | 1 | 2 | 2 | — | — | — | — | — |
| 1959–60 | Trois-Rivières Lions | EPHL | 61 | 28 | 42 | 70 | 104 | 7 | 2 | 2 | 4 | 19 |
| 1959–60 | New York Rangers | NHL | 3 | 0 | 0 | 0 | 0 | — | — | — | — | — |
| 1960–61 | New York Rangers | NHL | 13 | 1 | 2 | 3 | 8 | — | — | — | — | — |
| 1960–61 | Kitchener-Waterloo Beavers | EPHL | 55 | 16 | 25 | 41 | 77 | 7 | 1 | 1 | 2 | 12 |
| 1961–62 | New York Rangers | NHL | 30 | 4 | 11 | 15 | 11 | 6 | 2 | 3 | 5 | 2 |
| 1961–62 | Kitchener-Waterloo Beavers | EPHL | 37 | 23 | 19 | 42 | 87 | — | — | — | — | — |
| 1962–63 | New York Rangers | NHL | 70 | 11 | 13 | 24 | 72 | — | — | — | — | — |
| 1963–64 | Montreal Canadiens | NHL | 70 | 24 | 18 | 42 | 80 | 7 | 1 | 1 | 2 | 25 |
| 1964–65 | Montreal Canadiens | NHL | 63 | 18 | 23 | 41 | 61 | 10 | 0 | 0 | 0 | 10 |
| 1965–66 | Montreal Canadiens | NHL | 45 | 3 | 7 | 10 | 24 | 9 | 2 | 3 | 5 | 8 |
| 1965–66 | Houston Apollos | CPHL | 9 | 6 | 6 | 12 | 0 | — | — | — | — | — |
| 1966–67 | Montreal Canadiens | NHL | 48 | 11 | 8 | 19 | 31 | 9 | 0 | 2 | 2 | 6 |
| 1967–68 | Minnesota North Stars | NHL | 73 | 15 | 32 | 47 | 84 | 14 | 4 | 9 | 13 | 14 |
| 1968–69 | New York Rangers | NHL | 75 | 10 | 21 | 31 | 57 | 4 | 1 | 0 | 1 | 0 |
| 1969–70 | New York Rangers | NHL | 76 | 33 | 37 | 70 | 100 | 6 | 1 | 1 | 2 | 32 |
| 1970–71 | New York Rangers | NHL | 78 | 36 | 24 | 60 | 34 | 13 | 3 | 2 | 5 | 4 |
| 1971–72 | New York Rangers | NHL | 16 | 4 | 5 | 9 | 2 | — | — | — | — | — |
| 1971–72 | Vancouver Canucks | NHL | 59 | 19 | 19 | 38 | 21 | — | — | — | — | — |
| 1972–73 | Vancouver Canucks | NHL | 57 | 3 | 2 | 5 | 22 | — | — | — | — | — |
| 1973–74 | Quebec Nordiques | WHA | 9 | 0 | 0 | 0 | 2 | — | — | — | — | — |
| 1973–74 | Broome Dusters | NAHL | 7 | 0 | 1 | 1 | 0 | — | — | — | — | — |
| WHA totals | | | 9 | 0 | 0 | 0 | 2 | — | — | — | — | — |
| NHL totals | | | 776 | 192 | 222 | 414 | 607 | 78 | 14 | 21 | 35 | 101 |
