= Bob Nevin =

Canadian ice hockey player (1938–2020)

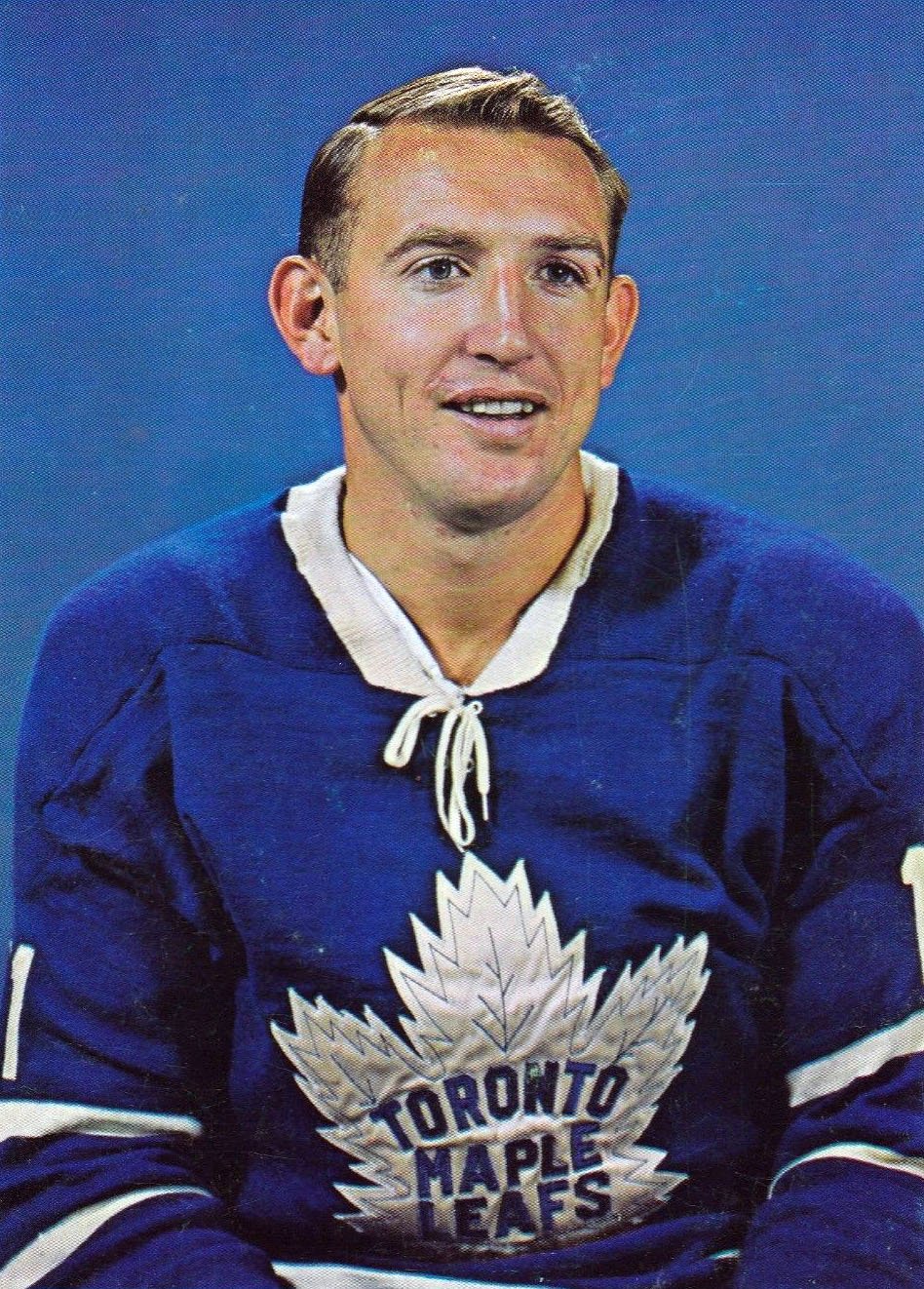
- Born: March 18, 1938 Timmins, Ontario, Canada
- Died: September 21, 2020 (aged 82) Toronto, Ontario, Canada
- Height: 6 ft 0 in (183 cm)
- Weight: 190 lb (86 kg; 13 st 8 lb)
- Position: Right Wing
- Shot: Right
- Played for: Toronto Maple Leafs; New York Rangers; Minnesota North Stars; Los Angeles Kings; Edmonton Oilers
- Playing career: 1957–1976

Robert Frank Nevin (March 18, 1938 – September 21, 2020) was a Canadian professional ice hockey right wing who played 18 seasons in the National Hockey League (NHL) between 1957–58 and 1975–76.

== Career ==
Nevin scored 21 goals as a rookie with the Toronto Maple Leafs in 1960–61 and finished second in the Calder Memorial Trophy voting to teammate Dave Keon. He formed a line with Red Kelly and Frank Mahovlich, helping the Maple Leafs win the Stanley Cup in 1962 and 1963. In 1964, Nevin was traded to the New York Rangers, along with four other players, in exchange for Andy Bathgate and Don McKenney. He played for the Rangers for seven years until being traded to the Minnesota North Stars for Bobby Rousseau. Nevin also played for the Los Angeles Kings, where he recorded a personal-best 72-point season and led the Kings to a franchise record 105 points. Following his time with the Kings, Nevin would head to the Edmonton Oilers of the World Hockey Association (WHA). He retired after participating in thirteen games with the Oilers after breaking his collarbone. Nevin played 1128 career NHL games, recording 307 goals and 419 assists for 726 points. Nevin was one of the first players in the National Hockey League to wear contact lenses, beginning in the early 1960s. During a 1962 game against the Blackhawks, Nevin lost his lens, and play was stopped to find it.

== Personal life ==
Nevin was born March 18, 1938 in Timmins, Ontario. His daughter, Brooke is an actress. On September 21, 2020, Nevin died at the age of 82.

== Legacy ==
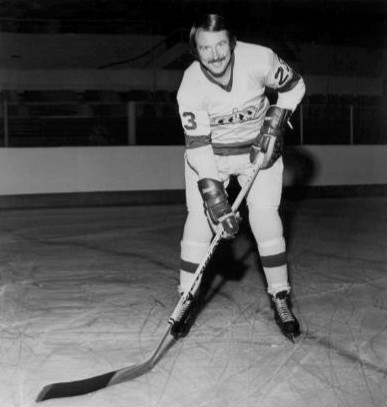
Nevin in 1973

In the 2009 book 100 Ranger Greats, the authors ranked Nevin at No. 51 all-time of the 901 New York Rangers who had played during the team's first 82 seasons.

== Career statistics ==
Source:			Regular season					Playoffs
Season	Team	League	GP	G	A	Pts	PIM	GP	G	A	Pts	PIM
1953–54	Weston Dukes	MetJHL	—	—	—	—	—	—	—	—	—	—
1954–55	Toronto Marlboros	OHA-Jr.	3	0	0	0	0	—	—	—	—	—
1955–56	Toronto Marlboros	OHA-Jr.	48	34	31	65	34	11	7	4	11	7
1955–56	Toronto Marlboros	M-Cup	—	—	—	—	—	6	5	0	5	6
1956–57	Toronto Marlboros	OHA-Jr.	51	45	29	74	52	9	5	6	11	13
1956–57	Rochester Americans	AHL	1	0	0	0	0	—	—	—	—	—
1957–58	Toronto Marlboros	OHA-Jr.	50	32	39	71	29	13	13	10	23	15
1957–58	Toronto Maple Leafs	NHL	4	0	0	0	0	—	—	—	—	—
1957–58	Rochester Americans	AHL	1	0	2	2	2	—	—	—	—	—
1957–58	Toronto Marlboros	M-Cup	—	—	—	—	—	4	2	1	3	16
1958–59	Toronto Maple Leafs	NHL	2	0	0	0	2	—	—	—	—	—
1958–59	Chicoutimi Saguenéens	QHL	35	16	8	24	12	—	—	—	—	—
1958–59	Rochester Americans	AHL	21	3	3	6	6	—	—	—	—	—
1959–60	Rochester Americans	AHL	71	32	42	74	10	12	6	4	10	4
1960–61	Toronto Maple Leafs	NHL	68	21	37	58	13	5	1	0	1	2
1961–62	Toronto Maple Leafs	NHL	69	15	30	45	10	12	2	4	6	6
1962–63	Toronto Maple Leafs	NHL	58	12	21	33	4	10	3	0	3	2
1963–64	Toronto Maple Leafs	NHL	49	7	12	19	26	—	—	—	—	—
1963–64	New York Rangers	NHL	14	5	4	9	9	—	—	—	—	—
1964–65	New York Rangers	NHL	64	16	14	30	28	—	—	—	—	—
1965–66	New York Rangers	NHL	69	29	33	62	10	—	—	—	—	—
1966–67	New York Rangers	NHL	67	20	24	44	6	4	0	3	3	2
1967–68	New York Rangers	NHL	74	28	30	58	20	6	0	3	3	4
1968–69	New York Rangers	NHL	71	31	25	56	14	4	0	2	2	0
1969–70	New York Rangers	NHL	68	18	19	37	8	6	1	1	2	2
1970–71	New York Rangers	NHL	78	21	25	46	10	13	5	3	8	0
1971–72	Minnesota North Stars	NHL	72	15	19	34	6	7	1	1	2	0
1972–73	Minnesota North Stars	NHL	66	5	13	18	0	—	—	—	—	—
1973–74	Los Angeles Kings	NHL	78	20	30	50	12	5	1	0	1	2
1974–75	Los Angeles Kings	NHL	80	31	41	72	19	3	0	0	0	0
1975–76	Los Angeles Kings	NHL	77	13	42	55	14	9	2	1	3	4
1976–77	Edmonton Oilers	WHA	13	3	2	5	0	—	—	—	—	—
NHL totals			1,128	307	419	726	211	84	16	18	34	24
WHA totals			13	3	2	5	0	—	—	—	—	—

== See also ==
- List of NHL players with 1,000 games played

Sporting positions
Preceded by Camille Henry	New York Rangers captain 1965–71	Succeeded by Vic Hadfield
