= 1965–66 NHL season =

National Hockey League season

- League: National Hockey League
- Sport: Ice hockey
- Duration: October 23, 1965 – May 5, 1966
- Games: 70
- Teams: 6
- TV partner(s): CBC, CTV, SRC (Canada); NBC, RKO General (United States)

Draft
- Top draft pick: Andre Veilleux
- Picked by: New York Rangers

Regular season
- Season champion: Montreal Canadiens
- Season MVP: Bobby Hull (Black Hawks)
- Top scorer: Bobby Hull (Black Hawks)

Playoffs
- Playoffs MVP: Roger Crozier (Red Wings)

Stanley Cup
- Champions: Montreal Canadiens
- Runners-up: Detroit Red Wings

NHL seasons
- ← 1964–65 1966–67 →

The 1965–66 NHL season was the 49th season of the National Hockey League. Six teams played 70 games each. The Montreal Canadiens won their second consecutive Stanley Cup as they defeated the Detroit Red Wings four games to two in the final series.

== League business ==
A new trophy was introduced for this season. Jack Adams won the first Lester Patrick Trophy for his contribution to hockey in the United States.

February saw the momentous announcement that six conditional franchises had been awarded to Los Angeles, San Francisco, St. Louis, Minneapolis–St. Paul, Philadelphia and Pittsburgh, all to begin play in 1967. The St. Louis franchise was surprising, as no formal application from the city had been tendered. It was awarded to fulfill the wishes of James D. Norris and Arthur Wirtz, owners of the Chicago Black Hawks, who also owned the St. Louis Arena, which they wanted to sell.

On the debit side, a strong bid from Vancouver was rejected, much to the anger of many Canadians and the protest of their Prime Minister Lester Pearson. A rumour was widely spread — fuelled by a corroborating statement from Leafs' general manager Punch Imlach that the Toronto and Montreal owners had vetoed the bid out of a dislike for sharing the proceeds from television broadcasts of the games. Vancouver would eventually get an NHL franchise in 1970.

The third NHL amateur draft was held on April 27, 1965, at the Queen Elizabeth Hotel in Montreal, Quebec. Andre Veilleux was selected first overall by the New York Rangers.

For the second consecutive year, the Canadian Amateur Hockey Association (CAHA) called for the end the NHL's system of sponsoring junior ice hockey teams and instead allow players who graduated from junior hockey to be chosen in the NHL amateur draft. CAHA president Lionel Fleury asked the NHL to terminate the existing professional-agreement rather than letting it expire in 1968. NHL president Clarence Campbell declined to terminate the agreement since 95 per cent of NHL players were produced by sponsored junior teams. The NHL felt that a draft of players might be viable but wanted to draft players at a younger age than 20, and wanted to continue making payments directly to amateur teams instead of the CAHA dispersing funds as it saw fit. Discussions remained unresolved until a new agreement with the requested changes was reached in August 1966.

=== Rule changes ===
The only significant rule change for this season was a requirement that the teams suit up two goaltenders for each game.

== Regular season ==
Among notable players to debut during this season were Ed Giacomin for the Rangers, Bill Goldsworthy for the Bruins, Ken Hodge for Chicago and Mike Walton for Toronto. In the meantime, however, the career of future Hockey Hall of Famer Ted Lindsay was over, as his request for reinstatement as an active player was vetoed by the Toronto ownership.

Ed Giacomin put together a six-game unbeaten streak early in the season to the delight of the fans, but the team's inexperience behind the blueline caught up with them as the team began to lose and the Rangers were out of contention quickly, causing Red Sullivan to be replaced by Emile Francis as the team's head coach. Rod Gilbert had to undergo a second spinal fusion surgery halfway through the season.

Gordie Howe scored his 600th NHL goal in Montreal on November 27 in a 3–2 loss to the Canadiens to the cheers of the local fans. Among lesser milestones in the season were Frank Mahovlich's 250th goal and Johnny Bucyk's and Claude Provost's 200th goal.

In an unusual incident, the Red Wings' jerseys were stolen from the visitors' dressing room in Montreal the night before a January game, and Detroit was compelled to play in the uniforms of their junior farm team in Hamilton, which were express shipped to Montreal in time for the match.

James D. Norris, owner of the Chicago Black Hawks, died of a heart attack in late February.

Due to the Rangers finishing in last place in the regular season standings, the 1965–66 season was the last season of the Original Six era where a franchise from the New York metropolitan area or even the state did not qualify for the Stanley Cup Playoffs. Beginning in the following season, teams from the area made the playoffs for a total of 58 consecutive seasons (not including the 2004–05 NHL lockout) until the streak ended during the 2025–26 season while the streak in the state ended in 2017–18 season.

=== Final standings ===
Pos	Team	Pld	W	L	T	GF	GA	GD	Pts
1	Montreal Canadiens	70	41	21	8	239	173	+66	90
2	Chicago Black Hawks	70	37	25	8	240	187	+53	82
3	Toronto Maple Leafs	70	34	25	11	208	187	+21	79
4	Detroit Red Wings	70	31	27	12	221	194	+27	74
5	Boston Bruins	70	21	43	6	174	275	−101	48
6	New York Rangers	70	18	41	11	195	261	−66	47

Source: National Hockey League

== Playoffs ==
=== Playoff bracket ===
The top four teams in the league qualified for the playoffs. In the semifinals, the first-place team played the third-place team, while the second-place team faced the fourth-place team, with the winners advancing to the Stanley Cup Finals. In both rounds, teams competed in a best-of-seven series (scores in the bracket indicate the number of games won in each best-of-seven series).

Semifinals
1	Montreal	4
3	Toronto	0
2	Chicago	2
4	Detroit	4

Stanley Cup Finals
1	Montreal	4
4	Detroit	2

=== Semifinals ===
The second game of the semifinal series between Detroit and Chicago on April 10, was nationally televised in the United States.

For the fourth straight year, it was Montreal vs. Toronto and Detroit vs. Chicago in the first round. The Canadiens were victorious over the Leafs in four straight games, while the Wings beat the Hawks in six.

==== (1) Montreal Canadiens vs. (3) Toronto Maple Leafs ====
The Montreal Canadiens were the best regular season team, earning 90 points. The Toronto Maple Leafs earned the third seed with 79 points. This was the twelfth playoff series between these two rivals, with Toronto winning six of their eleven previous series. This was a rematch from the 1965 semifinals, where Montreal won in six games. Toronto won sixteen of twenty-eight points in this year's regular season series.

The Canadiens defeated the Maple Leafs in a four-game sweep.

April 7	Toronto Maple Leafs	3–4	Montreal Canadiens	Montreal Forum	Recap
Eddie Shack (1) – 02:12; Frank Mahovlich (1) – pp – 18:08		First period	12:08 – pp – J.C. Tremblay (1)
No scoring		Second period	03:05 – John Ferguson (1); 08:13 – pp – Bobby Rousseau (1)
Bob Pulford (1) – 10:35		Third period	17:48 – Jean Beliveau (1)
Terry Sawchuck 28 saves / 32 shots		Goalie stats	Gump Worsley 25 saves / 28 shots

April 9	Toronto Maple Leafs	0–2	Montreal Canadiens	Montreal Forum	Recap
No scoring		First period	No scoring
No scoring		Second period	No scoring
No scoring		Third period	09:30 – pp – Claude Provost (1); 16:07 – Bobby Rousseau (2)
Terry Sawchuck 38 saves / 40 shots		Goalie stats	Gump Worsley 25 saves / 25 shots

April 12	Montreal Canadiens	5–2	Toronto Maple Leafs	Maple Leaf Gardens	Recap
No scoring		First period	01:26 – pp – Eddie Shack (2); 17:32 – Tim Horton (1)
Ralph Backstrom (1) – 08:16; Bobby Rousseau (3) – pp – 11:00; Terry Harper (1) – 11:26		Second period	No scoring
John Ferguson (2) – 00:16; Jean Beliveau (2) – en – 19:50		Third period	No scoring
Gump Worsley 28 saves / 30 shots		Goalie stats	Johnny Bower 33 saves / 37 shots

April 14	Montreal Canadiens	4–1	Toronto Maple Leafs	Maple Leaf Gardens	Recap
No scoring		First period	05:40 – Larry Hillman (1)
Gilles Tremblay (1) – pp – 09:32; Gilles Tremblay (2) – pp – 13:28		Second period	No scoring
Jimmy Roberts (1) – sh – 04:04; Dick Duff (1) – pp – 07:16		Third period	No scoring
Gump Worsley 30 saves / 31 shots		Goalie stats	Johnny Bower 34 saves / 38 shots

Montreal won series 4–0

==== (2) Chicago Black Hawks vs. (4) Detroit Red Wings ====
The Chicago Black Hawks earned the second seed with 82 points. The Detroit Red Wings earned the fourth seed with 74 points. This was the eighth playoff series between these two rivals, with Detroit winning four of their seven previous series. This was a rematch of the 1965 semifinals, where Chicago won in seven games. Chicago earned twenty-four of twenty-eight points in this year's regular season series.

The Red Wings upset the Black Hawks in six games.

April 7	Detroit Red Wings	1–2	Chicago Black Hawks	Chicago Stadium	Recap
Dean Prentice (1) – pp – 18:28		First period	06:08 – Kenny Wharram (1); 11:54 – pp – Bobby Hull (1)
No scoring		Second period	No scoring
No scoring		Third period	No scoring
Roger Crozier 26 saves / 28 shots		Goalie stats	Glenn Hall 29 saves / 30 shots

April 10	Detroit Red Wings	7–0	Chicago Black Hawks	Chicago Stadium	Recap
Floyd Smith (1) – pp – 04:10; Gordie Howe (1) – 12:11; Floyd Smith (2) – pp – 19:50		First period	No scoring
Andy Bathgate (1) – pp – 13:27		Second period	No scoring
Dean Prentice (2) – 03:39; Andy Bathgate (2) – pp – 05:38; Bert Marshall (1) – 06:00		Third period	No scoring
Roger Crozier 21 saves / 21 shots		Goalie stats	Glenn Hall 24 saves / 31 shots Dave Dryden 1 save / 1 shot

April 12	Chicago Black Hawks	2–1	Detroit Red Wings	Olympia Stadium	Recap
No scoring		First period	15:01 – Bryan Watson (1)
Chico Maki (1) – pp – 06:19; Eric Nesterenko (1) – 18:43		Second period	No scoring
No scoring		Third period	No scoring
Glenn Hall 29 saves / 30 shots		Goalie stats	Roger Crozier 22 saves / 24 shots

April 14	Chicago Black Hawks	1–5	Detroit Red Wings	Olympia Stadium	Recap
Stan Mikita (1) – pp – 08:04		First period	03:15 – pp – Paul Henderson (1)
No scoring		Second period	02:59 – Paul Henderson (2)
No scoring		Third period	01:06 – pp – Andy Bathgate (3); 01:55 – Bryan Watson (2); 08:08 – pp – Gordie Howe (2)
Glenn Hall 27 saves / 32 shots		Goalie stats	Roger Crozier 20 saves / 21 shots

April 17	Detroit Red Wings	5–3	Chicago Black Hawks	Chicago Stadium	Recap
Norm Ullman (1) – 08:14; Val Fonteyne (1) – sh – 15:08		First period	No scoring
Andy Bathgate (4) – pp – 01:19		Second period	03:05 – Doug Mohns (1); 14:51 – pp – Pat Stapleton (1)
Gordie Howe (3) – 11:41; Norm Ullman (2) – 15:43		Third period	16:28 – Bobby Hull (2)
Roger Crozier 28 saves / 31 shots		Goalie stats	Glenn Hall 22 saves / 27 shots

April 19	Chicago Black Hawks	2–3	Detroit Red Wings	Olympia Stadium	Recap
No scoring		First period	02:51 – pp – Andy Bathgate (5)
Phil Esposito (1) – pp – 14:24; Pat Stapleton (2) – 17:54		Second period	No scoring
No scoring		Third period	16:25 – Dean Prentice (3); 17:28 – Dean Prentice (4)
Glenn Hall 27 saves / 30 shots		Goalie stats	Roger Crozier 26 saves / 28 shots

Detroit won series 4–2

=== Stanley Cup Finals ===
The Montreal Canadiens were the defending champions in their twenty-second Stanley Cup Finals, after winning their thirteenth championship the previous year with a seven-game victory over the Chicago Black Hawks. This was the Detroit Red Wings' eighteenth Stanley Cup Finals, having won seven championships previously. Their most recent Finals came in 1964, when they lost to the Toronto Maple Leafs in seven games. This was the eleventh playoff series between these two teams, with Detroit winning seven of their ten previous series. Their most recent series had come in the 1958 semifinals, where Montreal won in a four-game sweep. Montreal won eighteen of twenty-eight points in this year's regular season series. Detroit would not return to the Stanley Cup Finals again until 1995.

Behind the skilled goaltending of Roger Crozier, who had missed parts of the regular season with illness, the Red Wings won the first two games of the Finals. However, Crozier was injured in the fourth game and the Canadiens won the Cup four games to two. Roger Crozier won the Conn Smythe Trophy as a member of the losing team.

April 24	Detroit Red Wings	3–2	Montreal Canadiens	Montreal Forum	Recap
Floyd Smith (3) – 13:25		First period	No scoring
Bill Gadsby (1) – 05:14		Second period	04:23 – Ralph Backstrom (2)
Paul Henderson (3) – 02:14		Third period	02:36 – Terry Harper (2)
Roger Crozier 33 saves / 35 shots		Goalie stats	Gump Worsley 32 saves / 35 shots

April 26	Detroit Red Wings	5–2	Montreal Canadiens	Montreal Forum	Recap
Andy Bathgate (6) – pp – 18:39		First period	06:55 – pp – J.C. Tremblay (2)
No scoring		Second period	No scoring
Bruce MacGregor (1) – 01:51; Ab McDonald (1) – 02:45; Floyd Smith (4) – 12:28; Dean Prentice (5) – 16:25		Third period	12:00 – Yvan Cournoyer (1)
Roger Crozier 23 saves / 25 shots		Goalie stats	Gump Worsley 29 saves / 34 shots

April 28	Montreal Canadiens	4–2	Detroit Red Wings	Olympia Stadium	Recap
Dave Balon (1) – 15:40; Jean Beliveau (3) – 19:12		First period	04:20 – Norm Ullman (3)
No scoring		Second period	No scoring
Gilles Tremblay (3) – 01:45; Gilles Tremblay (4) – pp – 03:21		Third period	19:59 – Gordie Howe (4)
Gump Worsley 29 saves / 31 shots		Goalie stats	Roger Crozier 27 saves / 31 shots

May 1	Montreal Canadiens	2–1	Detroit Red Wings	Olympia Stadium	Recap
No scoring		First period	No scoring
Jean Beliveau (4) – pp – 19:51		Second period	11:24 – Norm Ullman (4)
Ralph Backstrom (3) – 13:37		Third period	No scoring
Gump Worsley 22 saves / 23 shots		Goalie stats	Roger Crozier 3 saves / 3 shots Hank Bassen 28 saves / 30 shots

May 3	Detroit Red Wings	1–5	Montreal Canadiens	Montreal Forum	Recap
No scoring		First period	01:06 – Claude Provost (2); 19:21 – pp – Yvan Cournoyer (2)
Norm Ullman (5) – 14:22		Second period	01:05 – Dave Balon (2); 11:22 – Bobby Rousseau (4)
No scoring		Third period	05:31 – Dick Duff (2)
Roger Crozier 28 saves / 33 shots		Goalie stats	Gump Worsley 20 saves / 21 shots

May 5	Montreal Canadiens	3–2	OT	Detroit Red Wings	Olympia Stadium	Recap
Jean Beliveau (5) – 09:08		First period		No scoring
Leon Rochefort (1) – 10:11		Second period		11:55 – pp – Norm Ullman (6)
No scoring		Third period		10:30 – Floyd Smith (5)
Henri Richard (1) – 02:20		First overtime period		No scoring
Gump Worsley 28 saves / 30 shots		Goalie stats		Roger Crozier 19 saves / 22 shots

Montreal won series 4–2

== Awards ==
Bobby Hull set a new record for goals in a season with 54 and a new record for points in a season with 97, earning him the Art Ross Trophy and his second straight Hart Trophy as the league's most valuable player. No left-winger would pace the NHL in points again until Alexander Ovechkin in 2007–08. Jacques Laperriere of Montreal won the Norris Trophy as best defenceman.

1965–66 NHL awards
Prince of Wales Trophy: (Regular season champion)	Montreal Canadiens
Art Ross Trophy: (Top scorer)	Bobby Hull, Chicago Black Hawks
Calder Memorial Trophy: (Best first-year player)	Brit Selby, Toronto Maple Leafs
Conn Smythe Trophy: (Most valuable player, playoffs)	Roger Crozier, Detroit Red Wings
Hart Trophy: (Most valuable player, season)	Bobby Hull, Chicago Black Hawks
James Norris Memorial Trophy: (Best defenceman)	Jacques Laperriere, Montreal Canadiens
Lady Byng Memorial Trophy: (Excellence and sportsmanship)	Alex Delvecchio, Detroit Red Wings
Vezina Trophy: (Goaltender(s) of team with the best goals-against average)	Gump Worsley and Charlie Hodge, Montreal Canadiens

=== All-Star teams ===
First team	Position	Second team
Glenn Hall, Chicago Black Hawks	G	Gump Worsley, Montreal Canadiens
Jacques Laperriere, Montreal Canadiens	D	Allan Stanley, Toronto Maple Leafs
Pierre Pilote, Chicago Black Hawks	D	Pat Stapleton, Chicago Black Hawks
Stan Mikita, Chicago Black Hawks	C	Jean Beliveau, Montreal Canadiens
Gordie Howe, Detroit Red Wings	RW	Bobby Rousseau, Montreal Canadiens
Bobby Hull, Chicago Black Hawks	LW	Frank Mahovlich, Toronto Maple Leafs

== Player statistics ==
=== Scoring leaders ===
Note: GP = Games played, G = Goals, A = Assists, Pts = Points, PIM = Penalties in minutes

Player	Team	GP	G	A	Pts	PIM
Bobby Hull	Chicago Black Hawks	65	54	43	97	70
Stan Mikita	Chicago Black Hawks	68	30	48	78	56
Bobby Rousseau	Montreal Canadiens	70	30	48	78	20
Jean Beliveau	Montreal Canadiens	67	29	48	77	50
Gordie Howe	Detroit Red Wings	70	29	46	75	83
Norm Ullman	Detroit Red Wings	70	31	41	72	35
Alex Delvecchio	Detroit Red Wings	70	31	38	69	16
Bob Nevin	New York Rangers	69	29	33	62	10
Henri Richard	Montreal Canadiens	62	22	39	61	47
Murray Oliver	Boston Bruins	70	18	42	60	30

Source: NHL.

=== Leading goaltenders ===
Note: GP = Games played; Min = Minutes played; GA = Goals against; GAA = Goals against average; W = Wins; L = Losses; T = Ties; SO = Shutouts

Player	Team	GP	MIN	GA	GAA	W	L	T	SO
Johnny Bower	Toronto Maple Leafs	35	1998	75	2.25	18	10	5	3
Lorne Worsley	Montreal Canadiens	51	2899	114	2.36	29	14	6	2
Charlie Hodge	Montreal Canadiens	26	1301	56	2.58	12	7	2	1
Glenn Hall	Chicago Black Hawks	64	3747	164	2.63	34	21	7	4
Roger Crozier	Detroit Red Wings	64	3734	173	2.78	27	24	12	7
Dave Dryden	Chicago Black Hawks	11	453	23	3.05	3	4	1	0
Terry Sawchuk	Toronto Maple Leafs	27	1521	80	3.16	10	11	3	1
Cesare Maniago	N.Y. Rangers	28	1613	94	3.50	9	16	3	2
Ed Giacomin	N.Y. Rangers	36	2096	128	3.66	8	19	7	0
Bernie Parent	Boston Bruins	39	2083	128	3.69	11	20	3	1
Eddie Johnston	Boston Bruins	33	1744	108	3.72	10	19	2	1

== Coaches ==
- Boston Bruins: Milt Schmidt
- Chicago Black Hawks: Billy Reay
- Detroit Red Wings: Sid Abel
- Montreal Canadiens: Toe Blake
- New York Rangers: Emile Francis
- Toronto Maple Leafs: Punch Imlach

== Debuts ==
The following is a list of players of note who played their first NHL game in 1965–66 (listed with their first team, asterisk(*) marks debut in playoffs):

- J. P. Parise, Boston Bruins
- Derek Sanderson, Boston Bruins
- Bernie Parent, Boston Bruins
- Barry Ashbee, Boston Bruins
- Pete Mahovlich, Detroit Red Wings
- Danny Grant, Montreal Canadiens
- Ed Giacomin, New York Rangers

== Last games ==
The following is a list of players of note that played their last game in the NHL in 1965–66 (listed with their last team):

- Bill Gadsby, Detroit Red Wings

== Broadcasting ==
Hockey Night in Canada on CBC Television televised Saturday night regular season games and Stanley Cup playoff games. HNIC also began producing Wednesday night regular season game telecasts for CTV. Games were typically not broadcast in their entirety until the 1968–69 season, and were typically joined in progress.

NBC agreed to air 1966 Sunday afternoon playoff games, marking the first time since the 1959–60 season that the NHL aired nationally in the U.S., and the first time ever that postseason games aired on American network television. The clinching Game 6 of the 1966 Stanley Cup Finals on Thursday, May 5 aired across RKO General-owned stations.

== See also ==
- 1965–66 NHL transactions
- List of Stanley Cup champions
- 1965 NHL amateur draft
- National Hockey League All-Star Game
- 1965 in sports
- 1966 in sports
