= 1959–60 NHL season =

National Hockey League season

- League: National Hockey League
- Sport: Ice hockey
- Duration: October 7, 1959 – April 14, 1960
- Games: 70
- Teams: 6
- TV partner(s): CBC, SRC (Canada); CBS (United States)

Regular season
- Season champion: Montreal Canadiens
- Season MVP: Gordie Howe (Red Wings)
- Top scorer: Bobby Hull (Black Hawks)

Stanley Cup
- Champions: Montreal Canadiens
- Runners-up: Toronto Maple Leafs

NHL seasons
- ← 1958–59 1960–61 →

The 1959–60 NHL season was the 43rd season of the National Hockey League. Six teams played 70 games each. The Montreal Canadiens were the Stanley Cup winners as they defeated the Toronto Maple Leafs four games to none for their fifth straight Stanley Cup.

== Regular season ==
This regular season, like the two preceding it and the two following it, belonged to the Montreal Canadiens, who were in the midst of five straight first overall finishes and at the tail end of five straight Stanley Cup victories. The Detroit Red Wings, who were dead last and missed the playoffs the previous season, squeaked into the playoffs by riding a Hart Memorial Trophy performance by their ageless star right-winger, Gordie Howe.

The season was marked by important changes in the NHL, as Canadiens goaltender Jacques Plante, like Clint Benedict before him, began to wear a mask in hockey games. Plante, who had asthma-related problems throughout his career, first began wearing a mask in practice shortly after a sinus operation in 1957. On November 1, 1959, Plante's nose was broken by a shot from New York Rangers right-winger Andy Bathgate. After being stitched up, Plante insisted on wearing a mask for the remainder of the game. Montreal coach Toe Blake was bitterly opposed to the idea, but did not have a backup goaltender and relented after Plante said he would not return to the ice without a mask. Although many in the NHL disapproved of Plante's decision due to NHL tradition at the time, many followed suit after Plante went undefeated in ten games with the mask on.

Phil Watson suffered an ulcer and was quietly dismissed as Ranger coach and replaced by Alf Pike. Gump Worsley was demoted to the Springfield Indians of the AHL and Worsley screamed he was finished with hockey, but reported to Springfield anyway. Indians owner Eddie Shore, known for his criticism of his players, gave Worsley a surprise vote of confidence. Gump played well for the Indians.

There was trouble brewing for Rangers right-winger Andy Bathgate, who had ripped open Plante's nose on the night of the goalie mask's official NHL debut. In a January 1960 True Magazine article ghosted by Dave Anderson, the defending league MVP listed the names of players whom he considered guilty of the dangerous act of spearing. This was brought to the attention of NHL President Clarence Campbell, who fined Bathgate $500 and Ranger general manager Muzz Patrick $100 on the grounds the article was prejudicial to and against the welfare of the league.

After being demoted to Springfield, Gump Worsley was brought back up as Marcel Paille was even worse in goal for New York. Gump and the Rangers beat the Canadiens 8–3 in his first game back on January 3, but on January 21, Montreal bombed Worsley 11-2. Later against the Chicago Black Hawks, Worsley suffered an injury that finished him for the season; Hawks' winger Bobby Hull skated over his catching glove and severed two tendons in his fingers. Al Rollins was called up to replace him. Later, Olympic hero Jack McCartan played a few games for the Rangers, acquitting himself very well.

The Boston Bruins narrowly missed the playoffs despite a flurry of offense, sparked by the "Uke Line" of Johnny Bucyk, Vic Stasiuk, and Bronco Horvath. Horvath finished a close second to Chicago's Bobby Hull in the scoring race and was named to the Second All-Star Team. Slick centre Don McKenney led the NHL in assists while winning the Lady Byng Trophy and versatile Doug Mohns also contributed. 1959–60 saw two veteran Bruins, centre Fleming MacKell and goaltender Harry Lumley, play their last campaigns before retirement.

This season marked the first season of the Original Six era during which every active player had played for Original Six teams only. Ken Mosdell, the last player to play for another team, retired the previous season.

=== Final standings ===
National Hockey League
		GP	W	L	T	GF	GA	DIFF	Pts
1	Montreal Canadiens	70	40	18	12	255	178	+77	92
2	Toronto Maple Leafs	70	35	26	9	199	195	+4	79
3	Chicago Black Hawks	70	28	29	13	191	180	+11	69
4	Detroit Red Wings	70	26	29	15	186	197	−11	67
5	Boston Bruins	70	28	34	8	220	241	−21	64
6	New York Rangers	70	17	38	15	187	247	−60	49

== Stanley Cup playoffs ==
Montreal played the minimum number of games, 8, to win the Stanley Cup and in the process, became the last Cup winners in NHL history to go undefeated in the playoffs to date. After winning the Stanley Cup, Maurice Richard retired from the NHL as a champion.

=== Playoff bracket ===
The top four teams in the league qualified for the playoffs. In the semifinals, the first-place team played the third-place team, while the second-place team faced the fourth-place team, with the winners advancing to the Stanley Cup Finals. In both rounds, teams competed in a best-of-seven series (scores in the bracket indicate the number of games won in each best-of-seven series).

Semifinals
1	Montreal	4
3	Chicago	0
2	Toronto	4
4	Detroit	2

Stanley Cup Finals
1	Montreal	4
2	Toronto	0

=== Semifinals ===
==== (1) Montreal Canadiens vs. (3) Chicago Black Hawks ====
March 24	Chicago Black Hawks	3–4	Montreal Canadiens	Montreal Forum	Recap
Murray Balfour (1) – 16:15		First period	11:05 – Jean Beliveau (1); 15:04 – Andre Pronovost (1)
Ted Lindsay (1) – 16:18		Second period	08:45 – pp – Dickie Moore (1)
Ron Murphy (1) – 18:17		Third period	10:32 – Bernie Geoffrion (1)
Glenn Hall 28 saves / 32 shots		Goalie stats	Jacques Plante 19 saves / 22 shots

March 26	Chicago Black Hawks	3–4	OT	Montreal Canadiens	Montreal Forum	Recap
Kenny Wharram (1) – 13:13		First period		11:38 – Dickie Moore (2)
No scoring		Second period		17:55 – Marcel Bonin (1)
Bobby Hull (1) – 02:34; Bill Hay (1) – 18:58		Third period		08:35 – pp – Dickie Moore (3)
No scoring		First overtime period		08:38 – Doug Harvey (1)
Glenn Hall 36 saves / 40 shots		Goalie stats		Jacques Plante 28 saves / 31 shots

March 29	Montreal Canadiens	4–0	Chicago Black Hawks	Chicago Stadium	Recap
No scoring		First period	No scoring
Bill Hicke (1) – 10:15; Jean-Guy Talbot (1)		Second period	No scoring
Donnie Marshall (1) – 09:39; Bernie Geoffrion (2) – 18:04		Third period	No scoring
Jacques Plante 23 saves / 23 shots		Goalie stats	Glenn Hall 23 saves / 27 shots

March 31	Montreal Canadiens	2–0	Chicago Black Hawks	Chicago Stadium	Recap
No scoring		First period	No scoring
Claude Provost (1) – 04:47; Dickie Moore (4) – 13:09		Second period	No scoring
No scoring		Third period	No scoring
Jacques Plante 25 saves / 25 shots		Goalie stats	Glenn Hall 29 saves / 31 shots

Montreal won series 4–0

==== (2) Toronto Maple Leafs vs. (4) Detroit Red Wings ====
March 23	Detroit Red Wings	2–1	Toronto Maple Leafs	Maple Leaf Gardens	Recap
Gordie Howe (1) – 02:38; Len Haley (1) – 14:24		First period	No scoring
No scoring		Second period	No scoring
No scoring		Third period	16:04 – Carl Brewer (1)
Terry Sawchuck 18 saves / 19 shots		Goalie stats	Johnny Bower 28 saves / 30 shots

March 26	Detroit Red Wings	2–4	Toronto Maple Leafs	Maple Leaf Gardens	Recap
Pete Goegan (1) – 16:12		First period	13:37 – George Armstrong (1)
No scoring		Second period	17:04 – Larry Regan (1)
Alex Delvecchio (1) – 05:50		Third period	04:02 – Frank Mahovlich (1); 19:13 – en – Bob Pulford (1)
Terry Sawchuck 28 saves / 31 shots		Goalie stats	Johnny Bower 35 saves / 37 shots

March 27	Toronto Maple Leafs	5–4	3OT	Detroit Red Wings	Olympia Stadium	Recap
No scoring		First period		16:57 – pp – Norm Ullman (1); 17:18 – Marcel Pronovost (1)
Red Kelly (1) – 03:35; Dick Duff (1) – 07:00; Bob Pulford (2) – 08:05; Red Kelly (2) – pp – 19:24		Second period		16:58 – pp – Len Lunde (1)
No scoring		Third period		12:40 – Gerry Melnyk (1)
Frank Mahovlich (2) – 03:00		Third overtime period		No scoring
Johnny Bower 62 saves / 66 shots		Goalie stats		Terry Sawchuck 47 saves / 52 shots

March 29	Toronto Maple Leafs	1–2	OT	Detroit Red Wings	Olympia Stadium	Recap
No scoring		First period		13:15 – Gary Aldcorn (1)
Carl Brewer (2) – 10:29		Second period		No scoring
No scoring		Third period		No scoring
No scoring		First overtime period		01:54 – pp – Gerry Melnyk (2)
Johnny Bower 31 saves / 33 shots		Goalie stats		Terry Sawchuck 20 saves / 21 shots

April 2	Detroit Red Wings	4–5	Toronto Maple Leafs	Maple Leaf Gardens	Recap
No scoring		First period	05:14 – pp – Allan Stanley (1); 09:05 – pp – Bert Olmstead (1)
Warren Godfrey (1) – 10:32; Gerry Melnyk (3) – 11:56		Second period	12:45 – Allan Stanley (2)
Jack McIntyre (1) – 08:36; Alex Delvecchio (2) – 19:19		Third period	04:32 – Red Kelly (3); 12:10 – Larry Regan (2)
Terry Sawchuck 26 saves / 31 shots		Goalie stats	Johnny Bower 28 saves / 32 shots

April 3	Toronto Maple Leafs	4–2	Detroit Red Wings	Olympia Stadium	Recap
Bob Pulford (3) – 19:19		First period	05:26 – Murray Oliver (1)
No scoring		Second period	00:57 – pp – Norm Ullman (2)
Bob Pulford (4) – 00:37; Frank Mahovlich (3) – 02:40; Dick Duff (2) – 17:06		Third period	No scoring
Johnny Bower 28 saves / 30 shots		Goalie stats	Terry Sawchuck 30 saves / 34 shots

Toronto won series 4–2

=== Stanley Cup Finals ===
April 7	Toronto Maple Leafs	2–4	Montreal Canadiens	Montreal Forum	Recap
No scoring		First period	02:27 – pp – Dickie Moore (5); 08:55 – Doug Harvey (2); 11:56 – Jean Beliveau (2)
Bob Baun (1) – 05:23; Bert Olmstead (2) – 17:35		Second period	No scoring
No scoring		Third period	01:30 – Henri Richard (1)
Johnny Bower 38 saves / 42 shots		Goalie stats	Jacques Plante 27 saves / 29 shots

April 9	Toronto Maple Leafs	1–2	Montreal Canadiens	Montreal Forum	Recap
Larry Regan (3) – 19:32		First period	01:26 – Dickie Moore (6); 05:56 – Jean Beliveau (3)
No scoring		Second period	No scoring
No scoring		Third period	No scoring
Johnny Bower 34 saves / 36 shots		Goalie stats	Jacques Plante 26 saves / 27 shots

April 12	Montreal Canadiens	5–2	Toronto Maple Leafs	Maple Leaf Gardens	Recap
Donnie Marshall (2) – 13:54		First period	No scoring
Phil Goyette (1) – 00:21; Henri Richard (2) – 15:27		Second period	16:19 – Johnny Wilson (1)
Phil Goyette (2) – 08:57; Maurice Richard (1) – 10:07		Third period	19:47 – pp – Bert Olmstead (3)
Jacques Plante 32 saves / 34 shots		Goalie stats	Johnny Bower 26 saves / 31 shots

April 14	Montreal Canadiens	4–0	Toronto Maple Leafs	Maple Leaf Gardens	Recap
Jean Beliveau (4) – 08:16; Doug Harvey (3) – 08:45		First period	No scoring
Henri Richard (3) – 16:40		Second period	No scoring
Jean Beliveau (5) – 01:21		Third period	No scoring
Jacques Plante 30 saves / 30 shots		Goalie stats	Johnny Bower 28 saves / 32 shots

Montreal won series 4–0

== Awards ==
Gordie Howe won the Hart Trophy to become the first five-time winner of the Hart. In voting, he received 118 votes of a possible 180, twice as many as runner-up Bobby Hull. Howe was the last winner of the original Hart Trophy. The trophy was retired to the Hockey Hall of Fame and the NHL began presenting a new trophy, which was dubbed the Hart Memorial Trophy in its place. Hull won the Art Ross Trophy for the scoring championship, his first. Doug Harvey won the Norris Trophy for the fifth time, and the fifth time in the seven times it had been awarded. The Canadiens had the lowest goals against average, for the fifth consecutive time, and Jacques Plante was awarded his fifth Vezina Trophy. The Black Hawks' Glenn Hall was named to the First All-Star team as goaltender.

1959–60 NHL awards
Prince of Wales Trophy: (Regular season champion)	Montreal Canadiens
Art Ross Trophy: (Top scorer)	Bobby Hull, Chicago Black Hawks
Calder Memorial Trophy: (Best first-year player)	Bill Hay, Chicago Black Hawks
Hart Trophy: (Most valuable player)	Gordie Howe, Detroit Red Wings
James Norris Memorial Trophy: (Best defenceman)	Doug Harvey, Montreal Canadiens
Lady Byng Memorial Trophy: (Excellence and sportsmanship)	Don McKenney, Boston Bruins
Vezina Trophy: (Goaltender of team with the best goals-against average)	Jacques Plante, Montreal Canadiens

=== All-Star teams ===
First team	Position	Second team
Glenn Hall, Chicago Black Hawks	G	Jacques Plante, Montreal Canadiens
Doug Harvey, Montreal Canadiens	D	Allan Stanley, Toronto Maple Leafs
Marcel Pronovost, Detroit Red Wings	D	Pierre Pilote, Chicago Black Hawks
Jean Beliveau, Montreal Canadiens	C	Bronco Horvath, Boston Bruins
Gordie Howe, Detroit Red Wings	RW	Bernie Geoffrion, Montreal Canadiens
Bobby Hull, Chicago Black Hawks	LW	Dean Prentice, New York Rangers

== Player statistics ==
=== Scoring leaders ===
Note: GP = Games played; G = Goals; A = Assists; Pts = Points

Player	Team	GP	G	A	Pts
Bobby Hull	Chicago Black Hawks	70	39	42	81
Bronco Horvath	Boston Bruins	68	39	41	80
Jean Beliveau	Montreal Canadiens	60	34	40	74
Andy Bathgate	New York Rangers	70	26	48	74
Henri Richard	Montreal Canadiens	70	30	43	73
Gordie Howe	Detroit Red Wings	70	28	45	73
Bernie Geoffrion	Montreal Canadiens	59	30	41	71
Don McKenney	Boston Bruins	70	20	49	69
Vic Stasiuk	Boston Bruins	69	29	39	68
Dean Prentice	New York Rangers	70	32	34	66

=== Leading goaltenders ===
Note: GP = Games played; MIN = Minutes played; GA = Goals against; SO = Shut outs; AVG = Goals against average

Player	Team	GP	MINS	GA	SO	AVG
Jacques Plante	Montreal Canadiens	69	4140	175	3	2.54
Glenn Hall	Chicago Black Hawks	70	4200	179	6	2.56
Terry Sawchuk	Detroit Red Wings	58	3480	155	5	2.67
Johnny Bower	Toronto Maple Leafs	66	3960	177	5	2.68
Don Simmons	Boston Bruins	28	1680	91	2	3.25
Harry Lumley	Boston Bruins	42	2520	146	2	3.48
Gump Worsley	New York Rangers	39	2301	135	0	3.52

== Coaches ==
- Boston Bruins: Milt Schmidt
- Chicago Black Hawks: Rudy Pilous
- Detroit Red Wings: Sid Abel
- Montreal Canadiens: Toe Blake
- New York Rangers: Phil Watson and Alfred Pike
- Toronto Maple Leafs: Punch Imlach

== Debuts ==
The following is a list of players of note who played their first NHL game in 1959–60 (listed with their first team, asterisk(*) marks debut in playoffs):

- Dallas Smith, Boston Bruins
- Bill Hay, Chicago Black Hawks
- J. C. Tremblay, Montreal Canadiens
- Dave Balon, New York Rangers
- Ken Schinkel, New York Rangers

== Last games ==
The following is a list of players of note that played their last game in the NHL in 1959–60 (listed with their last team):

- Fleming MacKell, Boston Bruins
- Maurice Richard, Montreal Canadiens
- Al Rollins, New York Rangers
- Harry Lumley, Boston Bruins
- Dave Creighton, Toronto Maple Leafs

== Broadcasting ==
Hockey Night in Canada on CBC Television televised Saturday night regular season games and Stanley Cup playoff games. Games were not broadcast in their entirety until the 1968–69 season, and were typically joined in progress, while the radio version of HNIC aired games in their entirety.

In the U.S., this was final season of a four-year deal with CBS to televise Saturday afternoon regular season games. This season, CBS aired games from January to March. CBS decided not the renew its agreement, and the NHL would not be able to attract another American national network until the 1965–66 season.

== See also ==
- 1959–60 NHL transactions
- List of Stanley Cup champions
- 13th National Hockey League All-Star Game
- National Hockey League All-Star Game
- Ice hockey at the 1960 Winter Olympics
- 1959 in sports
- 1960 in sports
