= 1968 Stanley Cup playoffs =

NHL postseason tournament

Tournament details
- Teams: 8
- Defending champions: Toronto Maple Leafs (did not qualify)

Final positions
- Champions: Montreal Canadiens
- Runners-up: St. Louis Blues

Tournament statistics
- Scoring leader(s): Bill Goldsworthy (North Stars) (15 points)

Awards
- MVP: Serge Savard (Canadiens)

The 1968 Stanley Cup playoffs, was the playoff tournament of the National Hockey League (NHL) for the 1967–68 season, and the first after the expansion from six to twelve teams. The playoff system was thus expanded from a four-team to an eight-team tournament, and was designed so that four of the new expansion teams would qualify for the postseason.

The defending champion Toronto Maple Leafs did not qualify and a new champion would be crowned. The Montreal Canadiens would defeat the St. Louis Blues in four straight to win the Stanley Cup.

== Playoff seeds ==
All of the Original Six teams were placed in the new Eastern Division, and all of the new teams placed in the new Western Division. The top four teams in each division made the playoffs.

East Division

1. Montreal Canadiens – 94 points
2. New York Rangers – 90 points
3. Boston Bruins – 84 points
4. Chicago Black Hawks – 80 points

West Division

1. Philadelphia Flyers – 73 points
2. Los Angeles Kings – 72 points
3. St. Louis Blues – 70 points
4. Minnesota North Stars – 69 points

== Playoff bracket ==
In the first round, the first-place vs. third-place and second-place vs. fourth-place playoff format that had been in place for the previous 25 seasons was retained within the two divisions. The two winning teams from each division's first round series then met in the Stanley Cup semifinals. The two winners of the semifinals then advanced to the Stanley Cup Final.

This format guaranteed that an expansion team would at least reach the Final, but also highlighted the competitive imbalance between the Original Six teams in the Eastern Division and the expansion teams in the Western Division. The imbalance was readily apparent in the final regular season standings, as the fourth-place team in the East Division had a better record than the top team in the West.

In each round, teams competed in a best-of-seven series (scores in the bracket indicate the number of games won in each best-of-seven series).

Quarterfinals
1	Montreal	4
3	Boston	0
East Division
2	New York	2
4	Chicago	4
1	Philadelphia	3
3	St. Louis	4
West Division
2	Los Angeles	3
4	Minnesota	4

Semifinals
1	Montreal	4
4	Chicago	1
3	St. Louis	4
4	Minnesota	3

Stanley Cup Final
E1	Montreal	4
W3	St. Louis	0

== Quarterfinals ==
All series but Bruins–Canadiens had a game postponed after the assassination of Martin Luther King, Jr. on April 4.

=== (E1) Montreal Canadiens vs. (E3) Boston Bruins ===
The Montreal Canadiens were the best regular season team, earning 94 points. The Boston Bruins earned 84 points to finish third in the East Division. This was the thirteenth playoff series between these two rivals, with Montreal winning ten of their twelve previous series. Their most recent series had come in the 1958 Stanley Cup Final, which Montreal won in six games. These teams split their ten-game regular season series.

The Bruins, making their first appearance in the playoffs since 1959, were swept in four games.

April 4	Boston Bruins	1–2	Montreal Canadiens	Forum de Montréal	Recap
Ken Hodge (1) – 4:00		First period	14:08 – pp – Henri Richard (1)
No scoring		Second period	No scoring
No scoring		Third period	14:40 – Claude Provost (1)
Gerry Cheevers 33 saves / 35 shots		Goalie stats	Gump Worsley 21 saves / 22 shots

April 6	Boston Bruins	3–5	Montreal Canadiens	Forum de Montréal	Recap
Ken Hodge (2) – 13:58		First period	09:33 – Jacques Lemaire (1)
Ted Green (1) - pp - 13:06		Second period	04:15 – Jacques Laperriere (1); 09:24 – Jacques Lemaire (2)
John McKenzie (1) – 10:47		Third period	10:24 – Dick Duff (1); 17:34 – Jean Beliveau (1)
Gerry Cheevers 36 saves / 41 shots		Goalie stats	Gump Worsley 17 saves / 20 shots

April 9	Montreal Canadiens	5–2	Boston Bruins	Boston Garden	Recap
Jean Beliveau (2) – pp - 15:35		First period	5:15 – Ed Westfall (1)
Claude Provost (2) – pp - 7:39; Ralph Backstrom (1) – 8:41; John Ferguson (1) – 18:23		Second period	19:55 - Tommy Williams (1)
Dick Duff (2) – 8:23		Third period	No scoring
Gump Worsley 25 saves / 27 shots		Goalie stats	Gerry Cheevers 28 saves / 33 shots

April 11	Montreal Canadiens	3–2	Boston Bruins	Boston Garden	Recap
No scoring		First period	No scoring
Claude Larose (1) – 12:58		Second period	00:49 – Ed Westfall (2)
Claude Larose (2) – 7:20; Ralph Backstrom (2) – 16:33		Third period	18:34 – Ken Hodge (3)
Gump Worsley 35 saves / 37 shots		Goalie stats	Gerry Cheevers 31 saves / 34 shots

Montreal won series 4–0

=== (E2) New York Rangers vs. (E4) Chicago Black Hawks ===
The New York Rangers earned 90 points to finish second in the East Division. The Chicago Blackhawks finished fourth in the East Division with 80 points. This was the second playoff series between these two teams. Their only previous series came in the 1931 semifinals, where Chicago won the two-game total goals series 3 goals to 0. New York earned eleven of twenty points in this year's regular season series.

The Black Hawks, led by Bobby Hull and Stan Mikita upset the Rangers in six to set up a Montreal-Chicago East Division showdown.

April 4	Chicago Black Hawks	1–3	New York Rangers	Madison Square Garden	Recap
No scoring		First period	11:22 – Orland Kurtenbach (1)
No scoring		Second period	07:34 – pp – Harry Howell (1)
Pierre Pilote (1) – pp – 12:27		Third period	01:36 – Rod Gilbert (1)
Denis DeJordy 41 saves / 44 shots		Goalie stats	Eddie Giacomin 31 saves / 32 shots

April 9	Chicago Black Hawks	1–2	New York Rangers	Madison Square Garden	Recap
No scoring		First period	15:57 – Rod Gilbert (2)
Bobby Hull (1) – 10:12		Second period	No scoring
No scoring		Third period	12:40 – Donnie Marshall (1)
Denis DeJordy 28 saves / 30 shots		Goalie stats	Eddie Giacomin 36 saves / 37 shots

April 11	New York Rangers	4–7	Chicago Black Hawks	Chicago Stadium	Recap
Vic Hadfield (1) – pp – 16:47		First period	11:35 – Pit Martin (1)
Rod Gilbert (3) – 9:32; Rod Gilbert (4) – 9:38		Second period	08:48 – Stan Mikita (1)
Rod Seiling (1) – 13:22		Third period	02:36 – Pit Martin (2); 05:25 – pp – Stan Mikita (2); 08:59 – Dennis Hull (1); 18:19 – Doug Mohns (1); 19:42 – Gilles Marotte (1)
Eddie Giacomin 24 saves / 31 shots		Goalie stats	Denis DeJordy 29 saves / 33 shots

April 13	New York Rangers	1–3	Chicago Black Hawks	Chicago Stadium	Recap
Ron Stewart (1) – 17:20		First period	15:33 – Kenny Wharram (1)
No scoring		Second period	3:33 – Gilles Marotte (2)
No scoring		Third period	8:24 – Chico Maki (1)
Eddie Giacomin 41 saves / 44 shots		Goalie stats	Denis DeJordy 37 saves / 38 shots

April 14	Chicago Black Hawks	2–1	New York Rangers	Madison Square Garden	Recap
Donnie Marshall (2) – 5:20		First period	16:14 – pp – Bobby Hull (2)
No scoring		Second period	No scoring
Bobby Schmautz (1) – 16:46		Third period	No scoring
Denis DeJordy 32 saves / 33 shots		Goalie stats	Eddie Giacomin 27 saves / 29 shots

April 16	New York Rangers	1–4	Chicago Black Hawks	Chicago Stadium	Recap
No scoring		First period	05:50 – Doug Jarrett (1)
Rod Gilbert (5) – 03:15		Second period	19:25 – Chico Maki (2)
No scoring		Third period	02:39 – Pit Martin (3); 16:35 – Stan Mikita (3)
Eddie Giacomin 25 saves / 29 shots		Goalie stats	Denis DeJordy 26 saves / 27 shots

Chicago won series 4–2

=== (W1) Philadelphia Flyers vs. (W3) St. Louis Blues ===
The Philadelphia Flyers were West Division Champions, earning 73 points. The St. Louis Blues earned 70 points to finish third in the West Division. This was the first playoff series for both teams. Philadelphia earned sixteen of twenty points in this year's regular season series.

Philadelphia was upset by the Blues, led by goaltender Glenn Hall and coached by future Hall of Fame coach Scotty Bowman, in seven games.

April 4	St. Louis Blues	1–0	Philadelphia Flyers	Spectrum	Recap
No scoring		First period	No scoring
No scoring		Second period	No scoring
Jimmy Roberts (1) – 14:13		Third period	No scoring
Glenn Hall 14 saves / 14 shots		Goalie stats	Bernie Parent 32 saves / 33 shots

April 6	St. Louis Blues	3–4	Philadelphia Flyers	Spectrum	Recap
Dickie Moore (1) – 07:11		First period	01:32 – Pat Hannigan (1); 18:37 – pp – Don Blackburn (1); 19:10 – Claude Laforge (1)
Don McKenney (1) – 04:22; Larry Keenan (1) – 05:46		Second period	No scoring
No scoring		Third period	06:51 – Leon Rochefort (1)
Glenn Hall 37 saves / 41 shots		Goalie stats	Doug Favell 26 saves / 29 shots

April 10	Philadelphia Flyers	2–3	2OT	St. Louis Blues	St. Louis Arena	Recap
No scoring		First period		No scoring
Jean Gauthier (1) – pp – 17:35		Second period		02:54 – Terry Crisp (1)
Joe Watson (1) – 13:54		Third period		07:38 – Frank St. Marseille (1)
No scoring		Second overtime period		04:10 – Larry Keenan (2)
Bernie Parent 54 saves / 57 shots		Goalie stats		Glenn Hall 33 saves / 35 shots

April 11	Philadelphia Flyers	2–5	St. Louis Blues	St. Louis Arena	Recap
Andre Lacroix (1) – pp – 02:26		First period	06:52 – sh – Bill McCreary Sr. (1); 13:29 – pp – Red Berenson (1)
No scoring		Second period	16:55 – Dickie Moore (2)
Don Blackburn (2) – 14:04		Third period	00:49 – Red Berenson (2); 16:05 – sh – Barclay Plager (1)
Doug Favell 28 saves / 33 shots		Goalie stats	Glenn Hall 22 saves / 24 shots

April 13	St. Louis Blues	1–6	Philadelphia Flyers	Spectrum	Recap
No scoring		First period	09:01 – Leon Rochefort (2); 13:18 – Rosaire Paiement (1); 15:52 – sh – Forbes Kennedy (1)
No scoring		Second period	17:00 – Brit Selby (1)
Gerry Melnyk (1) – sh – 11:05		Third period	10:27 – pp – Rosaire Paiement (2); 13:26 – pp – Rosaire Paiement (3)
Glenn Hall 9 saves / 12 shots Seth Martin 17 saves / 20 shots		Goalie stats	Bernie Parent 30 saves / 31 shots

April 16	Philadelphia Flyers	2–1	2OT	St. Louis Blues	St. Louis Arena	Recap
No scoring		First period		18:06 – pp – Gerry Melnyk (2)
No scoring		Second period		No scoring
Andre Lacroix (2) – 19:45		Third period		No scoring
Don Blackburn (3) – 11:18		Second overtime period		No scoring
Bernie Parent 63 saves / 64 shots		Goalie stats		Glenn Hall 41 saves / 43 shots

April 18	St. Louis Blues	3–1	Philadelphia Flyers	Spectrum	Recap
Frank St. Marseille (2) – pp – 07:38		First period	18:25 – pp – Bill Sutherland (1)
Larry Keenan (3) – pp – 10:45		Second period	No scoring
Red Berenson (3) – en – 19:10		Third period	No scoring
Glenn Hall 26 saves / 27 shots		Goalie stats	Bernie Parent 28 saves / 30 shots

St. Louis won series 4–3

=== (W2) Los Angeles Kings vs. (W4) Minnesota North Stars ===
The Los Angeles Kings finished second in the West Division with 72 points. The Minnesota North Stars earned 69 points to finish fourth in the West Division. This was the first playoff series for both teams. Minnesota earned fourteen of twenty points in this year's regular season series.

The North Stars defeated the Kings in seven games.

April 4	Minnesota North Stars	1–2	Los Angeles Kings	The Forum	Recap
No scoring		First period	No scoring
No scoring		Second period	19:55 – pp – Eddie Joyal (1)
Dave Balon (1) – 03:54		Third period	03:13 – Bill White (1)
Cesare Maniago 38 saves / 40 shots		Goalie stats	Terry Sawchuck 30 saves / 31 shots

April 6	Minnesota North Stars	0–2	Los Angeles Kings	The Forum	Recap
No scoring		First period	08:45 – pp – Lowell MacDonald (1)
No scoring		Second period	18:12 – Eddie Joyal (2)
No scoring		Third period	No scoring
Cesare Maniago 37 saves / 39 shots		Goalie stats	Terry Sawchuck 18 saves / 18 shots

April 9	Los Angeles Kings	5–7	Minnesota North Stars	Met Center	Recap
Lowell MacDonald (2) – 12:44; Lowell MacDonald (3) – 13:56; Howie Hughes (1) – pp – 15:19		First period	05:51 – Bill Collins (1); 15:48 – Ray Cullen (1); 17:34 – pp – Mike McMahon Jr. (1)
No scoring		Second period	01:25 – Parker MacDonald (1); 16:56 – ps – Wayne Connelly (1)
Ted Irvine (1) – 03:23; Doug Robinson (1) – 04:15		Third period	00:09 – Bill Collins (2); 17:50 – Andre Boudrias (1)
Terry Sawchuck 18 saves / 23 shots Wayne Rutledge 9 saves / 11 shots		Goalie stats	Cesare Maniago 24 saves / 29 shots

April 11	Los Angeles Kings	2–3	Minnesota North Stars	Met Center	Recap
Bill Flett (1) – 03:37; Bill White (2) – 04:45		First period	11:30 – pp – Ray Cullen (2)
No scoring		Second period	06:31 – Mike McMahon Jr. (2); 09:27 – Dave Balon (2)
No scoring		Third period	No scoring
Terry Sawchuck 31 saves / 34 shots		Goalie stats	Cesare Maniago 30 saves / 32 shots

April 13	Minnesota North Stars	2–3	Los Angeles Kings	The Forum	Recap
No scoring		First period	02:14 – Gord Labossiere (1); 02:29 – Gord Labossiere (2)
No scoring		Second period	12:23 – pp – Eddie Joyal (3)
Wayne Connelly (2) – 07:15; Wayne Connelly (3) – 14:55		Third period	No scoring
Cesare Maniago 21 saves / 24 shots		Goalie stats	Wayne Rutledge 27 saves / 29 shots

April 16	Los Angeles Kings	3–4	OT	Minnesota North Stars	Met Center	Recap
Doug Robinson (2) – 11:12		First period		08:05 – sh – Mike McMahon Jr. (3)
Real Lemieux (1) – 1:37; Howie Hughes (2) – 04:20		Second period		No scoring
No scoring		Third period		07:23 – Bill Goldsworthy (1); 16:39 – Bob McCord (1)
No scoring		First overtime period		09:11 – Milan Marcetta (1)
Wayne Rutledge 29 saves / 33 shots		Goalie stats		Cesare Maniago 33 saves / 36 shots

April 18	Minnesota North Stars	9–4	Los Angeles Kings	The Forum	Recap
Parker MacDonald (2) – 02:24; Wayne Connelly (4) – pp – 08:05; Bill Goldsworthy (2) – 16:25		First period	02:51 – Doug Robinson (3)
Milan Marcetta (2) – 08:45; Parker MacDonald (3) – 11:58; Milan Marcetta (3) – 12:49; Dave Balon (3) – 15:58; Andre Boudrias (2) – 16:12		Second period	05:12 – pp – Eddie Joyal (4); 16:45 – Poul Popiel (1)
Bill Goldsworthy (3) – pp – 09:07		Third period	19:36 – Doug Robinson (4)
Cesare Maniago 22 saves / 26 shots		Goalie stats	Terry Sawchuck 24 saves / 33 shots

Minnesota won series 4–3

== Semifinals ==
=== (E1) Montreal Canadiens vs. (E4) Chicago Black Hawks ===
This was the 14th playoff series between these two teams. Their most recent series previous to this one was in the 1965 Stanley Cup Final, which Montreal won four games to three. Montreal earned fourteen of a possible twenty points from the ten 1967-1968 regular season matchups between the two teams.

The Black Hawks could not provide another upset, and lost to the Canadiens in five games, giving Montreal their only defeat of the playoffs.

April 18	Chicago Black Hawks	2–9	Montreal Canadiens	Montreal Forum	Recap
No scoring		First period	06:37 – Ralph Backstrom (3); 07:31 – Yvan Cournoyer (1); 09:24 – John Ferguson (2)
No scoring		Second period	15:26 – pp – Yvan Cournoyer (2)
Doug Jarrett (2) – 10:20; Gilles Marotte (3) – 11:26		Third period	00:10 – John Ferguson (3); 01:28 – Gilles Tremblay (1); 07:08 – Jacques Lemaire (3); 16:03 – Jean Beliveau (3); 17:50 – Claude Larose (3)
Denis DeJordy 24 saves / 33 shots		Goalie stats	Gump Worsley 32 saves / 34 shots

April 20	Chicago Black Hawks	1–4	Montreal Canadiens	Montreal Forum	Recap
Stan Mikita (4) – pp – 05:03		First period	10:58 – Jean Beliveau (4)
No scoring		Second period	10:04 – pp – Jean Beliveau (5); 15:41 – pp – Jacques Lemaire (4); 17:57 – pp – Jean Beliveau (6)
No scoring		Third period	No scoring
Denis DeJordy 35 saves / 39 shots		Goalie stats	Gump Worsley 23 saves / 24 shots

April 23	Montreal Canadiens	4–2	Chicago Black Hawks	Chicago Stadium	Recap
Jean Beliveau (7) - 00:39		First period	15:25 – Doug Jarrett (3)
Yvan Cournoyer (3) – pp – 02:39; Yvan Cournoyer (4) – 06:11; J. C. Tremblay (1) – 12:05		Second period	10:35 – Doug Jarrett (4)
No scoring		Third period	No scoring
Gump Worsley 39 saves / 41 shots		Goalie stats	Denis DeJordy 29 saves / 33 shots

April 25	Montreal Canadiens	1–2	Chicago Black Hawks	Chicago Stadium	Recap
No scoring		First period	08:57 – Bobby Hull (3)
Henri Richard (2) – 03:37		Second period	06:50 – sh – Bobby Hull (4)
No scoring		Third period	No scoring
Gump Worsley 3 saves / 4 shots Rogie Vachon 29 saves / 30 shots		Goalie stats	Denis DeJordy 28 saves / 29 shots

April 28	Chicago Black Hawks	3–4	OT	Montreal Canadiens	Montreal Forum	Recap
No scoring		First period		08:10 – Bobby Rousseau (1)
Bobby Schmautz (2) – 9:59		Second period		11:15 – sh – J. C. Tremblay (2)
Stan Mikita (5) – pp – 01:23; Wayne Maki (1) – 08:14		Third period		06:38 – pp – Jacques Lemaire (5)
No scoring		First overtime period		02:14 – Jacques Lemaire (6)
Denis DeJordy 40 saves / 44 shots		Goalie stats		Rogie Vachon 24 saves / 27 shots

Montreal won series 4–1

=== (W3) St. Louis Blues vs. (W4) Minnesota North Stars ===
St. Louis earned twelve of twenty points in this year's regular season series.

Ron Schock's goal in double OT, called the "Midnight Goal" by many hockey fans, gave the Blues the series and sent them to the Stanley Cup Final.

April 21	Minnesota North Stars	3–5	St. Louis Blues	St. Louis Arena	Recap
Milan Marcetta (4) – pp – 7:49		First period	14:27 - Tim Ecclestone (1)
Wayne Connelly (5) – 00:49; Wayne Connelly (6) – pp – 15:41		Second period	09:31 – pp – Frank St. Marseille (3); 10:05 – pp – Dickie Moore (3); 12:36 – sh – Bill McCreary Sr. (2)
No scoring		Third period	14:08 – Larry Keenan (4)
Cesare Maniago 28 saves / 33 shots		Goalie stats	Glenn Hall 25 saves / 28 shots

April 22	St. Louis Blues	2–3	OT	Minnesota North Stars	Met Center	Recap
Jimmy Roberts (2) – 12:28		First period		No scoring
No scoring		Second period		No scoring
Frank St. Marseille (4) – pp – 04:58		Third period		02:12 – Milan Marcetta (5); 07:00 – Bill Goldsworthy (4)
No scoring		First overtime period		03:41 – Parker MacDonald (4)
Glenn Hall 24 saves / 27 shots		Goalie stats		Cesare Maniago 23 saves / 25 shots

April 25	Minnesota North Stars	5–1	St. Louis Blues	St. Louis Arena	Recap
Milan Marcetta (6) – 09:38; Bill Goldsworthy (5) – 13:00; J. P. Parise (1) – 19:01		First period	No scoring
Bill Goldsworthy (6) – 16:33		Second period	04:53 – Dickie Moore (4)
Dave Balon (4) – pp – 00:09		Third period	No scoring
Cesare Maniago 30 saves / 31 shots		Goalie stats	Glenn Hall 16 saves / 21 shots

April 27	Minnesota North Stars	3–4	OT	St. Louis Blues	St. Louis Arena	Recap
Walt McKechnie (1) – 04:42; J. P. Parise (2) – pp – 14:40		First period		No scoring
Wayne Connelly (7) – 19:37		Second period		No scoring
No scoring		Third period		11:57 – Jimmy Roberts (3); 12:57 – Dickie Moore (5); 19:49 – Jimmy Roberts (4)
No scoring		First overtime period		01:32 – Gary Sabourin (1)
Cesare Maniago 39 saves / 43 shots		Goalie stats		Glenn Hall 21 saves / 24 shots

April 29	Minnesota North Stars	2–3	OT	St. Louis Blues	St. Louis Arena	Recap
Walt McKechnie (2) – 05:39		First period		01:53 – Bob Plager (1); 10:44 – Gary Sabourin (2)
Bob McCord (2) – 6:31		Second period		No scoring
No scoring		Third period		No scoring
No scoring		First overtime period		17:27 – Bill McCreary Sr. (3)
Cesare Maniago 52 saves / 55 shots		Goalie stats		Glenn Hall 26 saves / 28 shots

May 1	St. Louis Blues	1–5	Minnesota North Stars	Met Center	Recap
No scoring		First period	05:28 – pp – Wayne Connelly (8); 10:54 – Andre Boudrias (3)
Gary Sabourin (3) – 13:53		Second period	06:34 – Bill Goldsworthy (7); 17:16 – Bill Goldsworthy (8)
No scoring		Third period	09:52 – Milan Marcetta (7)
Glenn Hall 12 saves / 15 shots Seth Martin 21 saves / 23 shots		Goalie stats	Cesare Maniago 22 saves / 23 shots

May 3	Minnesota North Stars	1–2	2OT	St. Louis Blues	St. Louis Arena	Recap
No scoring		First period		No scoring
No scoring		Second period		No scoring
Walt McKechnie (3) – 16:49		Third period		17:20 – Dickie Moore (6)
No scoring		Second overtime period		02:50 – Ron Schock (1)
Cesare Maniago 36 saves / 38 shots		Goalie stats		Glenn Hall 44 saves / 45 shots

St. Louis won series 4–3

== Stanley Cup Final ==
The Montreal Canadiens advanced to their fourth consecutive Stanley Cup Final, having won the championship in 1965 and 1966. The St. Louis Blues beat out the five other teams also playing in their inaugural season to reach the Final. Montreal earned seven of eight points in this year's regular season series.

Blues coach Scotty Bowman, a long-time member of the Canadiens organization was unable to spur the Blues to an upset. The Canadiens, led by Jean Beliveau and Henri Richard swept the series in four games.

May 5	Montreal Canadiens	3–2	OT	St. Louis Blues	St. Louis Arena	Recap
Henri Richard (3) – 09:42		First period		09:19 – Barclay Plager (2)
Yvan Cournoyer (5) - 18:14		Second period		08:16 – pp – Dickie Moore (7)
No scoring		Third period		No scoring
Jacques Lemaire (7) – 01:41		First overtime period		No scoring
Gump Worsley 34 saves / 36 shots		Goalie stats		Glenn Hall 35 saves / 38 shots

May 7	Montreal Canadiens	1–0	St. Louis Blues	St. Louis Arena	Recap
No scoring		First period	No scoring
No scoring		Second period	No scoring
Serge Savard (1) – sh – 02:17		Third period	No scoring
Gump Worsley 19 saves / 19 shots		Goalie stats	Glenn Hall 35 saves / 36 shots

May 9	St. Louis Blues	3–4	OT	Montreal Canadiens	Montreal Forum	Recap
Frank St. Marseille (5) – pp – 10:22		First period		14:24 – pp - Yvan Cournoyer (6)
Red Berenson (4) - 03:37		Second period		01:23 – sh – Serge Savard (2)
Red Berenson (5) – sh – 17:25		Third period		11:43 – Ralph Backstrom (4)
No scoring		First overtime period		01:13 – Bobby Rousseau (2)
Glenn Hall 42 saves / 46 shots		Goalie stats		Gump Worsley 12 saves / 15 shots

May 11	St. Louis Blues	2–3	Montreal Canadiens	Montreal Forum	Recap
No scoring		First period	16:47 – Dick Duff (3)
Craig Cameron (1) – 06:53; Gary Sabourin (4) – pp – 07:50		Second period	No scoring
No scoring		Third period	07:24 – Henri Richard (4); 11:40 – J. C. Tremblay (3)
Glenn Hall 28 saves / 31 shots		Goalie stats	Gump Worsley 19 saves / 21 shots

Montreal won series 4–0

== Awards and records ==
Prince of Wales Trophy: (East Division champion)	Montreal Canadiens
Clarence S. Campbell Bowl: (West Division champion)	St. Louis Blues
Conn Smythe Trophy: (Playoff MVP)	Glenn Hall, St. Louis Blues

== See also ==
- 1967–68 NHL season

Preceded by 1967 Stanley Cup playoffs	Stanley Cup playoffs 1968	Succeeded by 1969 Stanley Cup playoffs
