= 1967–68 NHL transactions =

The following is a list of all team-to-team transactions that have occurred in the National Hockey League during the 1967–68 NHL season. It lists what team each player has been traded to, signed by, or claimed by, and for which player(s) or draft pick(s), if applicable.

== Trades between teams ==
=== May ===
| May 15, 1967 | To Toronto Maple Leafs Murray Oliver cash | To Boston Bruins Eddie Shack |
| May 15, 1967 | To Boston Bruins Ken Hodge; Phil Esposito; Fred Stanfield | To Chicago Black Hawks Jack Norris; Pit Martin; Gilles Marotte |

=== June ===
| June, 1967 (exact date unknown) | To Toronto Maple Leafs rights to Pete Conacher | To New York Rangers cash |
| June, 1967 (exact date unknown) | To Minnesota North Stars rights to Marshall Johnston | To New York Rangers cash |
| June 6, 1967 | To St. Louis Blues Tim Ecclestone; Gord Kannegiesser; Bob Plager; Gary Sabourin | To New York Rangers Rod Seiling |
| June 6, 1967 | To Pittsburgh Penguins Paul Andrea; Frank Francis; George Konik; Dunc McCallum | To New York Rangers Larry Jeffrey |
| June 6, 1967 | To Montreal Canadiens Bryan Watson | To Minnesota North Stars Bill Plager rights to Barrie Meissner rights to Leo Thiffault |
| June 6, 1967 | To Montreal Canadiens 1st-rd pick - 1971 Amateur Draft (# 7 - Chuck Arnason) | To Minnesota North Stars Andre Boudrias; Bob Charlebois; Bernard Cote |
| June 6, 1967 | To Toronto Maple Leafs cash | To Minnesota North Stars Barry MacKenzie rights to Gary Dineen |
| June 6, 1967 | To Toronto Maple Leafs cash | To Minnesota North Stars Ken Broderick |
| June 7, 1967 | To Montreal Canadiens cash | To Minnesota North Stars Carl Wetzel |
| June 7, 1967 | To Montreal Canadiens cash | To Minnesota North Stars rights to Bill Masterton |
| June 8, 1967 | To Toronto Maple Leafs Ken Block | To Los Angeles Kings rights to Red Kelly |
| June 14, 1967 | To Montreal Canadiens 1st-rd pick - 1970 Amateur Draft (# 6 - Chuck Lefley) | To Minnesota North Stars rights to Danny O'Shea |
| June 14, 1967 | To Detroit Red Wings cash | To Pittsburgh Penguins Les Binkley |
| June 14, 1967 | To Montreal Canadiens cash | To Minnesota North Stars Mike McMahon Jr. |
| June 14, 1967 | To Montreal Canadiens cash | To St. Louis Blues Ron Attwell; Pat Quinn |
| June 14, 1967 | To Montreal Canadiens Claude Cardin; Phil Obendorf | To St. Louis Blues Bill McCreary Sr. |
| June 16, 1967 | To Los Angeles Kings Trevor Fahey; Jim Murray; Ken Turlik | To New York Rangers Barclay Plager |
| June 21, 1967 | To Montreal Canadiens cash | To St. Louis Blues Claude Cardin |

=== August ===
| August 17, 1967 | To Chicago Black Hawks Paul Shmyr | To New York Rangers Camille Henry |

=== September ===
| September, 1967 (exact date unknown) | To Toronto Maple Leafs cash | To Philadelphia Flyers Al Millar |
| September 7, 1967 | To Detroit Red Wings Roy Edwards | To Pittsburgh Penguins Hank Bassen |

=== October ===
| October, 1967 (exact date unknown) | To Detroit Red Wings cash | To Philadelphia Flyers Dick Sarrazin |
| October 4, 1967 | To Montreal Canadiens cash | To Minnesota North Stars Don Johns |
| October 9, 1967 | To St. Louis Blues Craig Cameron; Don Giesebrecht; Larry Hornung | To Detroit Red Wings John Brenneman |
| October 12, 1967 | To Toronto Maple Leafs Jean-Paul Parise; Bryan Hextall Jr. | To California Seals Gerry Ehman |
| October 18, 1967 | To Boston Bruins 1st-rd pick - 1970 Amateur Draft (# 4 - Rick MacLeish) | To Philadelphia Flyers Rosaire Paiement |
| October 19, 1967 | To Minnesota North Stars Duke Harris; Bob McCord | To Detroit Red Wings Dave Richardson; Jean-Guy Talbot |

=== November ===
| November 27, 1967 | To St. Louis Blues Red Berenson; Barclay Plager | To New York Rangers Ron Attwell; Ron Stewart |

=== December ===
| December, 1967 (exact date unknown) | To California Seals rights to Larry Popein | To New York Rangers cash |
| December 23, 1967 | To Toronto Maple Leafs Murray Hall; Duke Harris; Don Johns; Len Lunde; Ted Taylor loan of Carl Wetzel | To Minnesota North Stars Milan Marcetta; Jean-Paul Parise |

=== January ===
| January 9, 1968 | To Oakland Seals John Brenneman; Ted Hampson; Bert Marshall | To Detroit Red Wings Kent Douglas |
| January 13, 1968 | To Toronto Maple Leafs cash | To Minnesota North Stars Bronco Horvath |

=== February ===
| February 27, 1968 | To Pittsburgh Penguins Wayne Hicks cash | To Philadelphia Flyers Art Stratton |

=== March ===
| March 3, 1968 | To Toronto Maple Leafs Norm Ullman; Floyd Smith; Paul Henderson; Doug Barrie | To Detroit Red Wings Garry Unger; Pete Stemkowski; Frank Mahovlich rights to Carl Brewer |
| March 25, 1968 | To Toronto Maple Leafs Pat Quinn | To St. Louis Blues cash |
