= Claude Cardin =

Canadian former ice hockey left winger

- Born: February 17, 1941 (age 85) Sorel-Tracy, Quebec, Canada
- Height: 5 ft 7 in (170 cm)
- Weight: 160 lb (73 kg; 11 st 6 lb)
- Position: Left wing
- Shot: Left
- Played for: St. Louis Blues
- Playing career: 1963–1971

Joseph Andre Claude Cardin (born February 17, 1941) is a Canadian former ice hockey left winger. He played one game in the National Hockey League with the St. Louis Blues during the 1967–68 season. The rest of his career, which lasted from 1963 to 1971, was spent in the minor leagues.

== Playing career ==
Cardin was signed by the Montreal Canadiens but was traded to the St. Louis Blues and played one game in the National Hockey League for the during their inaugural 1967–68 season, on November 265, 1967 against the Philadelphia Flyers, having spent much of his tenure with the Kansas City Blues. He split the 1970–71 season in the Eastern Hockey League for the Syracuse Blazers and in the International Hockey League for the Des Moines Oak Leafs before retiring.

== Career statistics ==
=== Regular season and playoffs ===
			Regular season					Playoffs
Season	Team	League	GP	G	A	Pts	PIM	GP	G	A	Pts	PIM
1963–64	Sherbrooke Castors	ETSHL	—	—	—	—	—	—	—	—	—	—
1963–64	Quebec Aces	AHL	3	0	0	0	4	—	—	—	—	—
1963–64	Omaha Knights	CHL	—	—	—	—	—	4	0	0	0	0
1964–65	Sherbrooke Castors	ETSHL	—	—	—	—	—	—	—	—	—	—
1964–65	Sherbrooke Castors	Al-Cup	—	—	—	—	—	13	10	9	19	50
1965–66	Sherbrooke Castors	ETSHL	27	12	25	37	77	12	6	7	13	38
1965–66	Sherbrooke Saints	Al-Cup	—	—	—	—	—	19	6	13	19	56
1966–67	Sherbrooke Castors	ETSHL	31	13	34	47	92	10	0	7	7	28
1967–68	St. Louis Blues	NHL	1	0	0	0	0	—	—	—	—	—
1967–68	Kansas City Blues	CHL	63	17	35	52	193	6	3	5	8	23
1968–69	Portland Buckaroos	WHL	5	0	3	3	0	—	—	—	—	—
1968–69	Kansas City Blues	CHL	58	10	34	44	153	4	1	1	2	4
1969–70	Saint-Hyacinthe Saints	QUE Sr	—	—	—	—	—	—	—	—	—	—
1969–70	Kansas City Blues	CHL	3	1	2	3	5	—	—	—	—	—
1970–71	Syracuse Blazers	EHL	16	3	9	12	12	—	—	—	—	—
1970–71	Des Moines Oak Leafs	IHL	29	10	17	27	20	14	3	10	13	34
CHL totals			124	28	71	99	351	14	4	6	10	27
NHL totals			1	0	0	0	0	—	—	—	—	—

== See also ==
- List of players who played only one game in the NHL
