= Glenn Hall =

Canadian ice hockey player (1931–2026)

- Hockey Hall of Fame, 1975
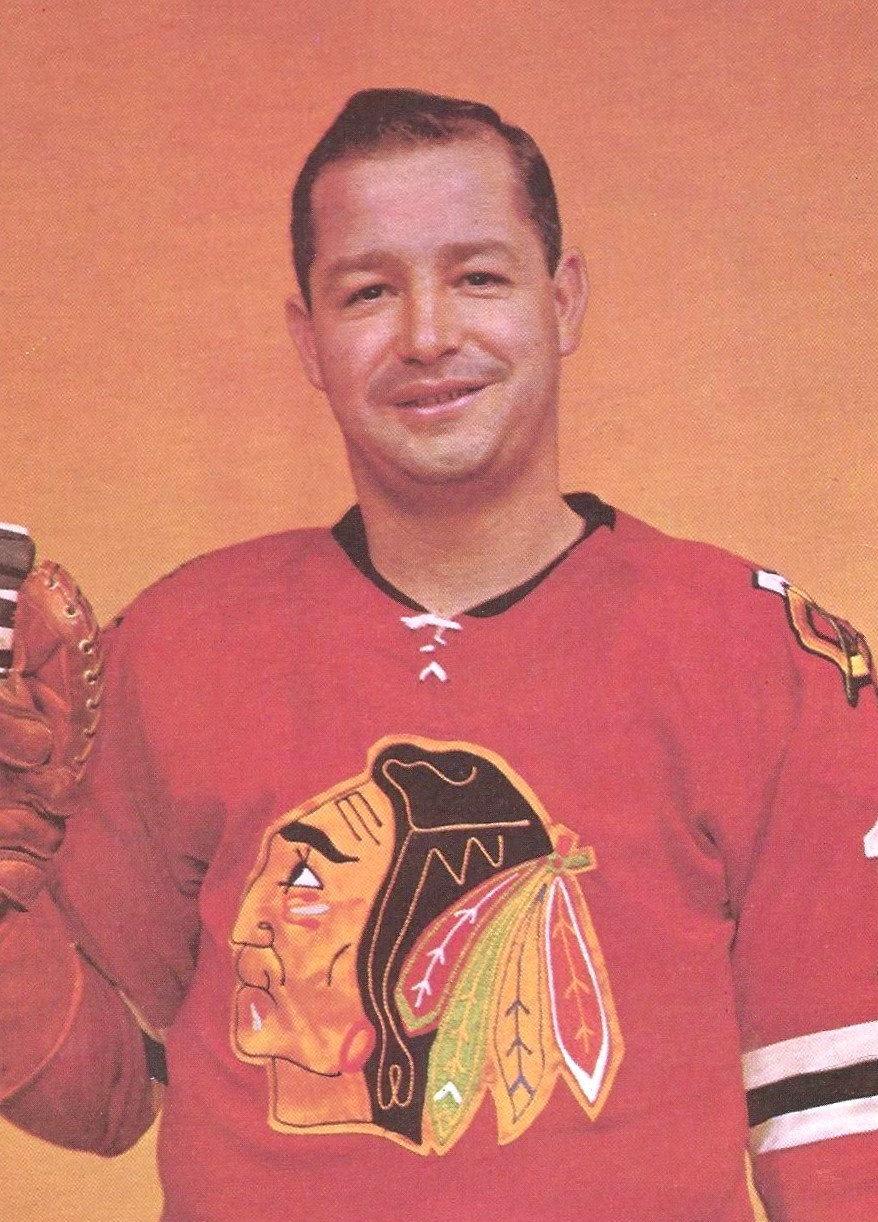
- Hall with the Chicago Black Hawks, c. 1963
- Born: October 3, 1931 Humboldt, Saskatchewan, Canada
- Died: January 7, 2026 (aged 94) Stony Plain, Alberta, Canada
- Height: 5 ft 11 in (180 cm)
- Weight: 190 lb (86 kg; 13 st 8 lb)
- Position: Goaltender
- Caught: Left
- Played for: Detroit Red Wings; Chicago Black Hawks; St. Louis Blues
- Playing career: 1951–1971

Glenn Henry Hall (October 3, 1931 – January 7, 2026) was a Canadian professional ice hockey goaltender. During his National Hockey League (NHL) career, which lasted from 1952 to 1971 with the Detroit Red Wings, Chicago Black Hawks, and St. Louis Blues, Hall set a record with 502 consecutive games played as a goaltender. He won the Vezina Trophy three times, was voted the first team All-Star goaltender seven times, and was awarded the Calder Memorial Trophy as best rookie in 1956. He also won the Stanley Cup with the Black Hawks in 1961. Nicknamed "Mr. Goalie", he was the first goaltender to use the butterfly style. In 2017, Hall was named one of the 100 Greatest NHL Players in history.

== Early life ==
Hall was the second son of Henry and Agnes Hall, born on October 3, 1931 in Humboldt, Saskatchewan. His father worked for Canadian National Railways as a train engineer, but picked up odd jobs in the depth of the Great Depression to ensure his family's wellbeing. As he grew up, he developed a slight speech impediment. Hall began playing ice hockey in the area, initially as a forward, but transitioned to a goaltender at the peewee level, after his team was left with none and everyone else refused to take on the position. Hall married his wife, Pauline, on May 5, 1954. Their first child was stillborn. He had four more children. He purchased a farm in Stony Plain, Alberta, west of Edmonton, where he resided in the offseason.

== Playing career ==
=== Amateur ===
Hall played minor ice hockey with the Humboldt Indians. While with the Indians he registered for a development camp in Saskatoon, Saskatchewan organized by the National Hockey League (NHL)'s Detroit Red Wings. Attended by Red Wings' scout Fred Pinkney, Hall caught his eye when he caught a puck barehanded after the glove that the Red Wings had provided (which did not fit correctly) slipped off his hand during play. Pinkney reported his find to the Red Wings' general manager, Jack Adams.

During the NHL's Original Six era, NHL teams owned their developmental affiliates down to the major junior level. The Red Wings' Ontario Hockey Association (OHA) affiliate, the Windsor Spitfires, were looking for a new goaltender ahead of the 1949–50 season. Adams brought Hall in from Saskatchewan and he established himself in training camp as the team's future goalie. In his first season with Windsor he helped the team to second place in the division with a record of 31 wins, 11 losses and one tie (31–11–1). However, he developed a pre-game ritual that followed him for the rest of his career. Prior to games, Hall would get so anxious that he would vomit. Always a goaltender who relied on his reflexes and preparation, Hall developed his stickhandling with Windsor. The Spitfires qualified for the playoffs and beat the Toronto Marlies in the first round but were knocked out by the Guelph Biltmores in the following round. In his second season in the OHA in 1950–51 he led the league in shutouts with six and earned the Red Tilson Trophy as the league's most valuable player (MVP). In the offseason he attended Chuck Rayner's goaltending camp, called Hockey Haven, where Rayner taught him the importance of skating and puck handling.

=== Professional ===
==== Detroit Red Wings ====
Based on Hall's play with the Spitfires and Terry Sawchuk's play in the American Hockey League (AHL), Detroit chose to trade their starting goalie, Harry Lumley in the 1950 offseason to make way for the two younger goalies. With Sawchuk now with Detroit, the goaltender acquired in the Lumley trade, Jim Henry, had his rights sold to the Boston Bruins in training camp and Hall was assigned to the Red Wings' AHL affiliate, the Indianapolis Capitals for the 1951–52 season. The Capitals finished last, but despite the team's poor play, Hall was routinely complimented for his and given the team MVP honours at season's end. Once the Capitals were eliminated from playoff contention, Hall was recalled by Detroit, but did not appear in their 1952 playoff run. Detroit still put Hall's name on the Stanley Cup, before he had played his first NHL game. The Capitals folded after the season and for the 1952–53 season, Hall was assigned to the Red Wings' new senior affiliate, the Edmonton Flyers of the Western Hockey League (WHL). Despite the team beginning slowly, Hall's play remained above reproach. As the season wore on, the Flyers improved and at Christmas break, Hall was recalled after Sawchuk suffered an injury in practice. Sawchuk was expected to miss two weeks and Hall would be his replacement. Hall arrived in Montreal to find that his equipment had not, and was forced to borrow goaltending gear from the Red Wings' equipment trainer in order to play. He made his NHL debut against the Montreal Canadiens on December 27, 1952, a game that ended in a 2–2 tie despite the Red Wings being outshot 34 to 17. He recorded his first NHL win in the next game, a 7–1 victory over the Boston Bruins. He was only expected to play five games before Sawchuk returned, and in his fifth game, he marked his first NHL and professional shutout in a 2–0 blanking of the Toronto Maple Leafs. Hall played well enough that when Sawchuk said he was not ready to play, Hall played a sixth game before being returned to Edmonton. With Edmonton, Hall and the team finished in fourth place, but qualified for the playoffs. The Flyers advanced to the final where they beat the Saskatoon Quakers to take the league title. Hall was named to the WHL's Second All-Star Team.

While Hall won a championship that season, Sawchuk struggled as the Red Wings were ousted in the first round by the Bruins. This led Jack Adams to declare the goaltending position open to whoever deserved it. However, this was not the case, as Hall was assigned to Edmonton for the entirety of the 1953–54 season and when Sawchuk missed time, he was replaced by career backup Dave Gatherum. Hall continued his excellent play and appeared in all 70 regular season games the Flyers played that season. He was once again named to the league's Second All-Star Team. Edmonton finished fourth again and advanced to the playoff semifinals where they were knocked out by the Calgary Stampeders. In the playoffs, he recorded two shutouts. He returned to Edmonton for the 1954–55 season, leading the league in wins with 38 and was named to the league's First All-Star Team. In February 1955, he was recalled by Detroit after Sawchuk's play was beginning to be affected by his off-ice behaviour. Publicly Adams stated that it was to give Sawchuk a break, but in reality Sawchuk was sent for team-mandated counseling for his alcoholism. The break was supposed to be a three-game stint, however, after winning his first two games, he received word that his wife was in labour and left Detroit to return to Edmonton. He spent the rest of the season in Edmonton, during which the team won the WHL championship. They then took part in the Canadian East versus West championship facing the Quebec Aces. The Flyers lost to the Aces in a controversial nine-game series.

In the offseason, Adams completely remade the Red Wings, trading eleven players off the roster, including Sawchuk who was sent to Boston. Going into training camp Hall was told by head coach Jimmy Skinner that the goaltending position was his to lose. Skinner, Hall's coach in Windsor, had replaced Tommy Ivan as the Red Wings' coach the season prior. The first game of the new season the Stanley Cup champion, the Red Wings, faced off against a team comprising the NHL's all stars from the other teams in the league. As their starting goalie in the 1955–56 season, Hall faced the all-stars in his first game and won 3–1. In that first full season, he established the butterfly style of goaltending that he pioneered. Not yet referred to it as that yet, the style broke two established rules of goaltending: staying on your feet and keeping your legs together. Hall kept his legs in an inverted-V with his pads spaced widely and his stick between his pads in the area known as the "five-hole", where the pads left an open space. The inverted-V allowed Hall to drop to the ice but kept him upright enough to let him stand up quicker. The style was doubted by coaches and older goalies such as Al Rollins, who believed the "stand up" form, which was the dominant form of the time, was better and Hall was blamed for the team's early struggles. However, the team's play turned around and Hall recorded seven shutouts by December, including three in a row. The team finished second in the league behind the Montreal Canadiens. Hall played every game of his first full season, recording twelve shutouts, winning the Calder Memorial Trophy as rookie of the year, and being voted the Second Team All-Star goaltender. He finished second behind Jacques Plante for the Vezina Trophy, awarded to the goaltender with the lowest goals allowed. The team advanced to the 1956 Stanley Cup final, facing Plante's Canadiens, but lost the series. He played in the All-Star Game to start the season again, this time as one of the league's all-stars. During his second full season with Detroit, he again played every game and was voted as the First Team All-Star goaltender after leading the league in wins with 38. He finished runner-up to Plante again for the Vezina Trophy, while the team finished first in the league. However, the season was marred by conflict within the Red Wings organization. Teammate Ted Lindsay moved to form a union for the league's players by utilising the All-Star Game to talk to the NHL teams' other leaders. News reached management of the unionisation attempt and Jack Adams confronted every player on the Red Wings, deciding to try and isolate Lindsay from the team. Hall refused to follow Adams' orders and fell out with the Red Wings' general manager. In the playoffs, the Red Wings faced the Bruins in the first round. The Bruins had lost their starting goaltender and were going with their backup, Don Simmons. Adams saw a path to the Stanley Cup, but a shot cut Hall's face that required 18 stitches to close in the series. Despite having an enormous cut on his face, Hall finished the series but did not play as well as he had during the regular season. After the Bruins eliminated the Red Wings, Adams confronted Hall again and then publicly blamed Hall for the series loss. In the offseason, as Adams once again made over his team, Hall was traded to the Chicago Black Hawks along with Lindsay.

==== Chicago Black Hawks ====
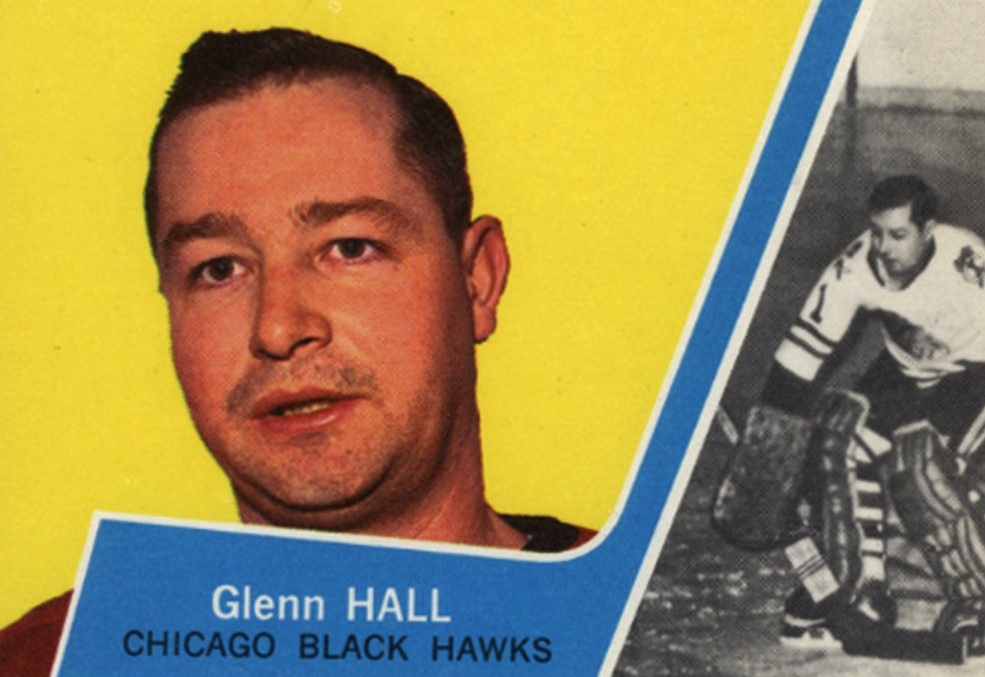
Glenn Hall 1963 trading card

Tommie Ivan, the general manager of Chicago, now had three goalies ahead of training camp: Hall, Harry Lumley, and Al Rollins. To clear a path for Hall, Lumley was sent to the Black Hawks' affiliate in Buffalo and Rollins was not even invited to training camp. Established as the team's goaltender, Hall continued his consecutive game streak in Chicago, playing in all 70 games in the 1957–58 season. It was due to Hall's play that the Black Hawks finished fifth in the league, the first time in four seasons that they did not finish last. As a result, Hall was named a First Team All-Star once again, the first Black Hawks goaltender to be named to any all-star team since Lorne Chabot in 1934–35. He played in his third All-Star game to start the 1958–59 season and went on to appear in every game for the Black Hawks. The team added a flashy new rookie that season, Bobby Hull, and finished third in the league, qualifying for the playoffs. It was the first time in six seasons that the Black Hawks made an appearance in the postseason. However, they faced the league and Stanley Cup champion Montreal Canadiens, who eliminated them. In the 1959–60 season, Chicago added to new impactful players, Stan Mikita and Bill Hay. Mikita lived with Hall and his wife throughout his first season in the league. Hall played every game of the season again, and the Black Hawks finished third. It was during this season that Chicago's arena announcer began introducing Hall before games as "Mr. Goalie". He finished second to Plante for the Vezina and was named to the league's First All-Star Team. Chicago faced Montreal in the playoffs and much like the season before, the Canadiens ended the Black Hawks season.

For the 1960–1961 season, Mikita moved out of Hall's home, sharing a house with Ed Litzenberger a few doors away. Hall opened the season playing in the All-Star Game. He appeared in every game and finished behind Plante for the Vezina while leading the league in shutouts. He was named to the Second All-Star Team as the team finished in third. They faced the champion Canadiens in the semi-finals, but Hall recorded back-to-back shutouts on the way to beating them. Chicago advanced to the 1961 Stanley Cup Final where they faced his former team, the Detroit Red Wings. This was the team's first appearance in the final since 1944. Hall backstopped the Black Hawks to their first Stanley Cup championship since 1938, a 4–2 series victory over Detroit. He began the 1961–62 season in the All-Star Game as part of the champions' team for the second time. After the cup win, he was lauded as the best goaltender in the league by the press. However, the Black Hawks started the season poorly and only won ten games by January 1, 1962. On January 17, Hall played in his 500th consecutive game (including playoffs). In a pre-game ceremony, Chicago awarded Hall with a gold goalie stick and the team's owners, Arthur Wirtz and James D. Norris, gifted him a brand new Chevrolet car that was driven onto the ice. Hall completed the season with nine shutouts, the league lead, finished second to Plante for the Vezina, and was named to the Second All-Star Team. The Black Hawks finished third again in the league and faced the Canadiens for the fourth consecutive season and fifth for Hall personally. The Canadiens were eliminated by the Black Hawks who advanced to face the Toronto Maple Leafs in the 1962 Final. Despite shutting out the Maple Leafs in game three, the Black Hawks lost the series. On November 6, 1962, Hall felt something wrong in his back during practice. The next night, Hall's record streak finally came to an end against the Boston Bruins as he withdrew before the start of the game. Hall's backup Denis DeJordy replaced him. Hall played 502 consecutive regular season games, which spanned eight seasons, an NHL record for goaltenders, along with 50 consecutive playoff games and seven consecutive all-star games. The team had started strong that season, but in the second half, went on a run that saw their league leading record collapse and fall down the standings. They still made the playoffs, but were knocked out by the Red Wings in the semifinals, losing the series after taking the lead early on. Following the season, head coach Rudy Pilous was fired. Hall himself won the Vezina and led the league in shutouts with five. He was named a First Team All-Star.

The league's teams regularly began rostering backup goaltenders and Pilous' replacement, Billy Reay, had DeJordy and Dave Dryden battle for the job of Hall's backup the 1963–64 season. DeJordy won the spot, but despite having a backup, Hall still appeared in 65 of the team's 70 games, along with an All-Star Game appearance. He led the league in wins and shutouts but came in as runner up to the Vezina and was named to the NHL's First All-Star Team. The Black Hawks started out well and led the league until the final weeks of the season when they collapsed again. They faced Detroit in the playoffs and were eliminated for the second consecutive season in the semifinals. He made his now nearly annual appearance in the all-star game to open the 1964–65 season, but Reay came to Hall and informed him that he intended to give DeJordy more time in the net that season. The team finished third and Hall saw his lowest number of games played since his first season supporting Sawchuk making only 41 appearances, while DeJordy made 29. He had an even wins-to-losses record with 18 apiece and for the first time in his career as a starting goaltender, was not named to one of the all-star teams. The team faced Detroit in the playoffs and after losing game one, Hall was replaced as the starter by DeJordy, ending Hall's consecutive playoff game record. Hall returned to the starting net for game three and shined, helping lead the Black Hawks over the Red Wings. The Black Hawks faced the Canadiens in the 1965 Stanley Cup Final, but ultimately lost. Hall was a finalist for the new Conn Smythe Trophy as playoff most valuable player, however, it was awarded to Jean Béliveau of the Canadiens.

In the offseason Hall contemplated retirement and was late showing up to training camp ahead of the 1965–66 season. As his absence extended later and later, rumours of retirement grew. However, Hall did eventually return to the Black Hawks where Dave Dryden had won the backup spot over DeJordy. Hall began the season well, but when star forward Bobby Hull went down with a knee injury, he stepped up his game until Hull's return. However, he was no longer capable of playing every game and mid-season he requested time off, to be replaced by Dryden. Refreshed from his break, Hall went on to lead the league in wins and finished second in shutouts. He was named to the First All-Star Team and the team finished second in the standings. Chicago played Detroit in the semifinals for the third consecutive year. After game two, in which the Black Hawks lost, Hall was stopped by a Red Wings fan who got into an argument with the goaltender and a small scuffle between the two occurred. Ultimately, the Red Wings, playing in front of Roger Crozier who had adopted Hall's play style, bounced the Black Hawks from the playoffs.

After the season, Hall approached Black Hawks' general manager Ivan and informed him he was retiring. Chicago went into the 1966–67 season with DeJordy and Dryden as goaltending options. However, by the end of training camp, the team did not think either was ready to take over the net full time and contacted Hall, offering him a raise if he came back. Hall accepted and operated in a two-goalie system for the season, sharing the duties with DeJordy. Hall made 32 appearances and shared the Vezina Trophy with DeJordy. The team finished first in the standings and faced the Maple Leafs in the playoffs The Black Hawks opted to go with DeJordy as the series starter, but after the first two games were losses, Reay switched to Hall for game three. Chicago was winning the game when in the third period, Hall was struck in the face by a shot, opening a cut that required over twenty stitches to close. As a result, Chicago went back to DeJordy. Ultimately the Maple Leafs triumphed, and Hall played his last game for Chicago in the final game of the series.

==== St. Louis Blues ====
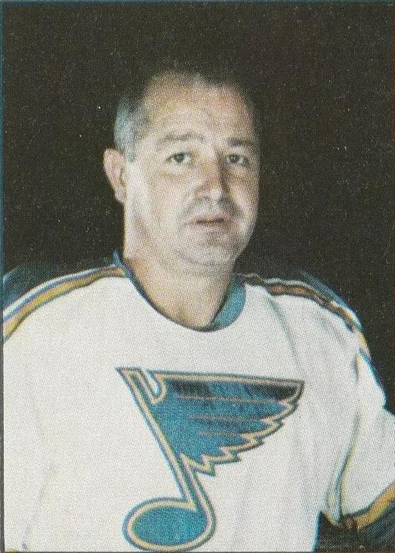
Hall with the St. Louis Blues

For the 1967–68 season, the NHL added six expansion franchises. To provide players for the new teams, the Original Six franchises could only protect 11 skaters each. The league was now split into two divisions, and all six expansion franchises were placed in the Western Division. Hall, who had to be coaxed back to the NHL the previous season, was expected by the Black Hawks to retire and was left unprotected in the 1967 NHL expansion draft. He was selected by the St. Louis Blues and agreed to return to the NHL after general manager and head coach Lynn Patrick agreed to a one-year contract that made him the third-highest paid player in the league behind Bobby Hull and Gordie Howe. Initially, the Blues found themselves at the bottom of the division and in an effort to change the team's fortunes, Patrick relinquished the coaching duties, handing them over to his assistant, Scotty Bowman. Patrick in the meantime went out and acquired key players like Red Berenson and Dickie Moore. Hall had his own struggles, coming to Bowman mid-season and stating that he wished to retire, having lost his edge. Bowman sent him to see the team doctor and his confidence was renewed. He played nearly every game as the playoffs neared and helped the Blues jump into third place in the division. He played in 49 games, recording five shutouts. The playoffs were also modified, as each division playoff winner would advance to the 1968 Stanley Cup Final. The Blues won the West Division Playoffs in two seven-game series. Hall's play led them to the Final. This was Hall's fourth trip to the finals, as the Blues played the Montreal Canadiens. The Blues, who were expected to be soundly beaten by the favourite Canadiens, lost the best-of-seven series in four consecutive one-goal games: (3–2 (OT), 1–0. 4–3 (OT), and 3–2). Hall, who kept the expansion Blues in the series, was awarded the Conn Smythe Trophy as the playoffs' Most Valuable Player.

In 1968, veteran goaltender Jacques Plante joined the Blues, sharing duties with Hall. To keep both older goalies fresh (and happy), Bowman divided the season into thirds for each goalie, in which each goaltender would play two games and then sit for two games while the three younger goaltenders on the team, Robbie Irons, Gary Edwards, and Ted Ouimet, would operate as the backups. The two put together a fine season in 1968–69, and both Hall and Plante were selected to play in the All-Star Game, the first in which the teams were chosen by division. Hall also chose to begin wearing a goalie mask that season. The Blues clinched the division title, and Hall finished the season with 41 appearances including eight shutouts. Hall and Plante were awarded the Vezina Trophy and set a then-Blues' record of 13 shutouts in a season. Hall was voted the First Team All-Star goaltender, his record seventh selection, and the first player to be named with three separate teams. The Blues qualified for the playoffs and Bowman chose Hall to be the team's starting goaltender. In game one of the opening series, Hall pulled his hamstring and was replaced by Plante. The Blues advanced to the 1969 Stanley Cup Final with Plante in net. In the final they faced the Canadiens for the second consecutive year, and Plante's run of good play ran out against his former team. In game four, facing elimination, Hall returned to the next, but it was not enough and the Canadiens won the Stanley Cup again.

Hall retired after the 1968–69 season, but Bowman, thinking that Hall might return and kept him on the protected list. Having lost the final in consecutive years in close games, Bowman acquired Phil Goyette and Andre Boudrias to help the team's offence. Hall returned to St. Louis for the award ceremony to receive the Vezina. While in the city, he was wooed by the Blues' owners, who brought him out of retirement with a two-year contract. Now sharing the net with Plante and Ernie Wakely, Hall appeared in 18 games in 1969–70 season. The team won the division again. The team advanced to the 1970 Final versus the Boston Bruins. In game one, Plante was knocked unconscious by a Fred Stanfield shot that had been tipped upwards towards his head by Phil Esposito. With Plante removed from the game, Bowman turned to Wakely. Wakely did not fare well for the Blues either as Plante's replacement in game one or as the starter in game two. Hall took over the net for game three and was present when the Bruins' Bobby Orr scored the Stanley Cup-clinching goal in game four after 40 seconds of overtime, to eliminate the Blues for the third consecutive season.

In the offseason Plante was traded to Toronto and for the 1970–71 season it was Hall and Wakely in net for the Blues. The team finished second in the division and faced the Minnesota North Stars in the playoffs, who knocked them out of the playoffs. At the end of the season, Hall retired again. The Los Angeles Kings attempted to acquire his rights, having agreed to terms with Hall, but the Blues wanted a first-round draft pick in return, and as part of the agreement with Hall, he would only sign with the Kings if they got him for free, so Hall remained retired.

== Retirement and death ==
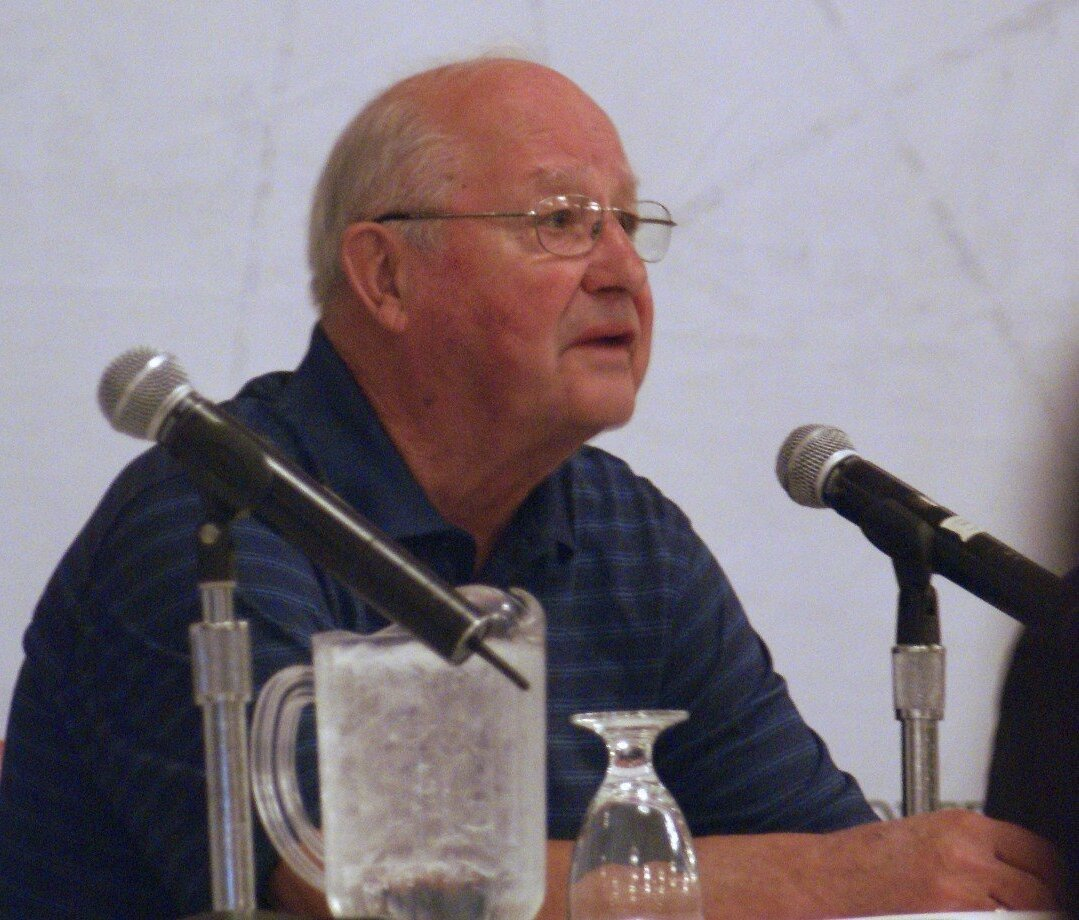
Glenn Hall in 2011

Hall's career ended after the 1970–71 season when he announced his final retirement at the age of 39. In 1972, Hall was approached by Ray Kinesewich, the head coach of the nascent Alberta Oilers of the World Hockey Association to be their goaltending coach. With the Oilers struggling both Hall and Kinesewich were fired in February 1973. That same year Hall faced unproven allegations when one of the informants in a Quebec Police Commission inquiry into organized crime claimed that a Black Hawks goaltender had bet against the team in games against the New York Rangers and Boston Bruins in the 1960s. As Hall was the goaltender of note during that period, suspicion fell upon him, but the allegations were found to be baseless. In 1975–76, Hall was contracted by the Blues as a goaltending consultant, tutoring Ed Staniowski and John Davidson. He then joined the Colorado Rockies as a goaltending consultant and remained with the team until they relocated to become the New Jersey Devils. The Calgary Flames then hired him away and Hall tutored Don Edwards and Mike Vernon, winning the Stanley Cup a third time as the goaltending coach with them in 1989.

In 1975, Hall was elected to the Hockey Hall of Fame, and has also been named to the Saskatchewan Sports Hall of Fame, the St. Louis Sports Hall of Fame, and the Chicago Sports Hall of Fame. In 1988, Hall had his jersey retired by the Black Hawks.

Hall died in Stony Plain, Alberta on January 7, 2026, at age 94. He was the grandfather of Grant Stevenson.

== Legacy ==
Hall was the goaltender that made the butterfly style of goaltending mainstream, and is now widely used. Hall ended his career with 407 wins (13th on the all-time list), 84 shutouts (fourth on the all-time list), a career goals against average of 2.49, and was voted to eleven All-Star Games. Hall is thought of by many as one of the best goalies to ever play the game. At the time of his death Hall still held the record for the most First Team All-Star selections, with seven.

In 1998, Hall was ranked number 16 on The Hockey News' list of the 100 Greatest Hockey Players, a status reaffirmed during the NHL's centennial celebrations when he was named one of the 100 Greatest NHL Players in history. His standing as one of the sport's elite figures is attributed to both his high career winning percentage and his "Iron Man" record of 502 consecutive start, a feat widely considered unbreakable.

Hall's legacy is preserved through significant civic tributes in the communities where he lived and played. In 2005, the City of Humboldt, Saskatchewan, erected a permanent monument in Glenn Hall Park on Highway #5 (Glenn Hall Drive), detailing his career from his junior hockey years in Humboldt through his NHL retirement. Additionally, his career, accomplishments, and local impact are memorialized by the Glenn Hall Centennial Arena in Stony Plain, Alberta, where he resided for several decades until his death.

== Career statistics ==
=== Regular season and playoffs ===
			Regular season									Playoffs
Season	Team	League	GP	W	L	T	MIN	GA	SO	GAA	SV%	GP	W	L	MIN	GA	SO	GAA	SV%
1947–48	Humboldt Indians	N-SJHL	5	5	0	0	300	17	0	3.40	—	2	0	2	120	15	0	7.50	—
1948–49	Humboldt Indians	N-SJHL	24	13	9	2	1420	86	1	3.63	—	7	3	4	420	36	0	5.14	—
1949–50	Windsor Spitfires	OHA-Jr.	43	31	11	1	2580	152	0	3.53	—	11	6	5	660	37	0	3.36	—
1950–51	Windsor Spitfires	OHA-Jr.	54	32	18	4	3240	167	6	3.09	—	8	—	—	480	30	0	3.75	—
1951–52	Indianapolis Capitals	AHL	68	22	40	6	4190	272	0	3.89	—	—	—	—	—	—	—	—	—
1952–53	Edmonton Flyers	WHL	63	27	27	9	3780	207	2	3.29	—	15	10	5	905	53	0	3.51	—
1952–53	Detroit Red Wings	NHL	6	4	1	1	360	10	1	1.67	.931	—	—	—	—	—	—	—	—
1953–54	Edmonton Flyers	WHL	70	29	30	11	4200	259	0	3.70	—	13	7	6	783	44	2	3.37	—
1954–55	Edmonton Flyers	WHL	66	38	18	10	3960	187	5	2.83	—	16	11	5	1000	43	1	2.58	—
1954–55	Detroit Red Wings	NHL	2	2	0	0	120	2	0	1.00	.967	—	—	—	—	—	—	—	—
1955–56	Detroit Red Wings	NHL	70	30	24	16	4200	147	12	2.10	.921	10	5	5	604	28	0	2.78	.908
1956–57	Detroit Red Wings	NHL	70	38	20	12	4200	156	4	2.23	.926	5	1	4	300	15	0	3.00	.884
1957–58	Chicago Black Hawks	NHL	70	24	39	7	4200	200	7	2.86	.908	—	—	—	—	—	—	—	—
1958–59	Chicago Black Hawks	NHL	70	28	29	13	4200	208	1	2.97	.897	6	2	4	360	21	0	3.50	.909
1959–60	Chicago Black Hawks	NHL	70	28	29	13	4200	180	6	2.57	.917	4	0	4	249	14	0	3.37	.892
1960–61	Chicago Black Hawks	NHL	70	29	24	17	4200	176	6	2.51	.920	12	8	4	772	26	2	2.02	.936
1961–62	Chicago Black Hawks	NHL	70	31	26	13	4200	185	9	2.64	.913	12	6	6	720	31	2	2.58	.924
1962–63	Chicago Black Hawks	NHL	66	30	20	15	3910	166	5	2.55	.916	6	2	4	360	25	0	4.17	.896
1963–64	Chicago Black Hawks	NHL	65	34	19	11	3860	148	7	2.30	.930	7	3	4	408	22	0	3.24	.889
1964–65	Chicago Black Hawks	NHL	41	18	17	5	2440	99	4	2.43	.920	13	7	6	760	28	1	2.21	.925
1965–66	Chicago Black Hawks	NHL	64	31	24	7	3747	164	4	2.63	.914	6	2	4	347	22	0	3.80	.874
1966–67	Chicago Black Hawks	NHL	32	19	5	5	1664	66	2	2.38	.920	3	1	2	176	8	0	2.73	.923
1967–68	St. Louis Blues	NHL	49	19	21	9	2858	118	5	2.48	.912	18	8	10	1111	45	1	2.43	.916
1968–69	St. Louis Blues	NHL	41	19	12	8	2354	85	8	2.17	.928	3	0	2	131	5	0	2.29	.931
1969–70	St. Louis Blues	NHL	18	7	8	3	1010	49	1	2.91	.904	7	4	3	421	21	0	2.99	.907
1970–71	St. Louis Blues	NHL	31	13	11	8	1761	71	2	2.42	.917	3	0	3	180	9	0	3.00	.864
NHL totals			906	407	326	162	53,544	2,230	84	2.49	.917	115	49	65	6,899	320	6	2.78	.911

"Hall's stats". The Goaltender Home Page. Archived from the original on August 8, 2017.

== Awards and achievements ==
- Calder Memorial Trophy winner in 1956.
- Played in 1955, 1956, 1957, 1958, 1960, 1961, 1962, 1963, 1964, 1965, 1967, 1968, and 1969 NHL All-Star Games.
- Selected to the NHL first All-Star team in 1957, 1958, 1960, 1963, 1964, 1966, and 1969.
- Selected to the NHL second All-Star team in 1956, 1961, 1962, and 1967.
- Vezina Trophy Winner in 1963, 1967, and 1969.
- Conn Smythe Trophy Winner in 1968.
- Stanley Cup Championship in 1952, 1961, and 1989 (as goaltender coach).
- Holds NHL record for most consecutive games started by a goaltender with 502 games.
- Inducted into the Hockey Hall of Fame in 1975.
- In 1998, he was ranked number 16 on The Hockey News' list of the 100 Greatest Hockey Players.
- In January 2017, Hall was part of the first group of players to be named one of the '100 Greatest NHL Players' in history.
- Chicago Blackhawks Hall of Fame and number retired.
- St. Louis Blues Hall of Fame.

== See also ==
- List of NHL goaltenders with 300 wins

== Sources ==
- Adrahtas, Tom (2002). Glenn Hall, the man they call Mr. Goalie. Vancouver: Greystone Books. ISBN 1-55054-912-X.
- Druzin, Randi (2013). Between the Pipes. Vancouver: Greystone Books. ISBN 978-1-77100-015-4.
- Hunter, Douglas (1995). A Breed Apart: An Illustrated History of Goaltending. Toronto: Viking. ISBN 0-670-86114-6.

Preceded by Dave Keon	Winner of the Conn Smythe Trophy; 1968	Succeeded by Serge Savard
Preceded by Ed Litzenberger	Winner of the Calder Memorial Trophy; 1956	Succeeded by Larry Regan
Preceded by Jacques Plante	Winner of the Vezina Trophy; 1963	Succeeded by Charlie Hodge
Preceded by Gump Worsley and Charlie Hodge	Winner of the Vezina Trophy with Denis DeJordy; 1967	Succeeded by Rogatien Vachon and Gump Worsley
Preceded by Rogatien Vachon and Gump Worsley	Winner of the Vezina Trophy with Jacques Plante; 1969	Succeeded by Tony Esposito
