= 1967–68 NHL season =

National Hockey League season

- League: National Hockey League
- Sport: Ice hockey
- Duration: October 11, 1967 – May 11, 1968
- Games: 74
- Teams: 12
- TV partner(s): CBC, CTV, SRC (Canada); CBS (United States)

Draft
- Top draft pick: Rick Pagnutti
- Picked by: Los Angeles Kings

Regular season
- Season champions: Montreal Canadiens
- Season MVP: Stan Mikita (Black Hawks)
- Top scorer: Stan Mikita (Black Hawks)

Playoffs
- Playoffs MVP: Glenn Hall (Blues)

Stanley Cup
- Champions: Montreal Canadiens
- Runners-up: St. Louis Blues

NHL seasons
- 1966–67 1968–69

The 1967–68 NHL season was the 51st season of the National Hockey League. The league expanded to 12 teams, putting the new six in the newly created West Division, while the "Original Six" were all placed in the newly created East Division. The regular season schedule was expanded to 74 games per team and featured the first time all twelve teams played games on the same day on October 18, 1967. The Montreal Canadiens won the Stanley Cup against the new St. Louis Blues, in four games.

== League business ==
This season saw the NHL expand from the "original six" teams by adding six new franchises, including the St. Louis Blues, California Seals, Philadelphia Flyers, Minnesota North Stars, Pittsburgh Penguins, and Los Angeles Kings. On December 8, 1967, the California Seals were renamed the Oakland Seals before being renamed again to the California Golden Seals in 1970. As a result of the expansion, the League reorganized its teams into two divisions, placing the Original Six teams into the East Division and the expansion franchises into the West Division. The NHL, furthermore, increased its regular season schedule from 70 to 74 games per team with each team playing 50 games against opponents within its own division (10 against each divisional opponent) and 24 games with teams in the opposite division (4 games per opponent). The newly created Clarence S. Campbell Bowl was awarded to the team that finished first in the West Division during the regular season, the Prince of Wales Trophy was likewise awarded the East Division first-place team. A new format for the playoffs would also be introduced which would see the top four teams in each division qualify for the post-season with the first and third and the second and fourth place teams in each respective division pairing off in a divisional semi-final series. The winners of the latter would then compete in their respective divisional final series and a berth in the Stanley Cup finals. All series would be best-of-seven contests.

The 1967 NHL expansion draft was held on June 6, at the Queen Elizabeth Hotel in Montreal, Quebec to fill the rosters of the six expansion teams. The 1967 NHL amateur draft was then held one day later at the same hotel. Under the agreement signed with the Canadian Amateur Hockey Association (CAHA), all players who graduated from junior hockey became eligible for the amateur draft this year, and the minimum age of players subject to amateur draft was changed to 20. The Kings had the first overall picks in both drafts, selecting Terry Sawchuk first overall in the expansion draft, and drafting Rick Pagnutti first overall in the amateur draft.

This season, the NHL also added a new player award called the Bill Masterton Memorial Trophy, named in honour of Bill Masterton who died on January 15, 1968, after sustaining an injury during a game (the first time an NHL player had ever died directly as a result of an on-ice injury).

There were a large number of holdouts this year. Three New York Ranger players, including Rod Gilbert, Arnie Brown and Orland Kurtenbach were fined $500 by their team. However, Ed Van Impe of the Flyers refused to sign his contract, followed by Earl Ingarfield and Al MacNeil also refused to sign, then Tim Horton of Toronto, Norm Ullman of Detroit and Kenny Wharram and Stan Mikita of Chicago. Led by Alan Eagleson, the new National Hockey League Players' Association was up and running.

== Arena changes ==
- The expansion Blues moved into St. Louis Arena.
- The expansion Flyers moved into the Spectrum.
- The expansion Kings played their first two home games at Long Beach Arena in Long Beach, California, then their next 14 at Los Angeles Memorial Sports Arena in Los Angeles before the team's permanent arena, The Forum in Inglewood, California, opened on December 30, 1967.
- The expansion North Stars moved into the Metropolitan Sports Center in Bloomington, Minnesota.
- The Rangers moved from the third Madison Square Garden to the fourth by February 18, 1968.
- The expansion Penguins moved into Pittsburgh Civic Arena.
- The expansion Seals moved into the Oakland–Alameda County Coliseum Arena.

== Regular season ==
=== Highlights ===
All twelve of the League's member teams played games on the same day for the first time on October 18, 1967, competing in six scheduled games — the most the League had ever scheduled on one day.

On October 11, 1967, Jean Beliveau of Montreal scored his 400th career goal on goaltender Hank Bassen of the Pittsburgh Penguins. This also happened to be the first game in Penguins franchise history.

The Canadiens stumbled out of the gate. In their first west coast road trip, the Seals beat them 2–1 and the Kings beat them 4–2. The Habs lost quite a few more and were in last place by December. But by January, Jean Beliveau began to score and others were inspired also. The Habs got very hot, winning 12 consecutive games and then put together 10 more wins to take the East Division lead. Paced by Gump Worsley, who had 6 shutouts and a 1.98 goals against average and backstopped the team to the fewest goals allowed in the league, they managed to keep first place thereafter. Worsley, for the first time, made the first all-star team.

On February 24, 1968, Rogie Vachon of Montreal was the victim of four goals by Rod Gilbert, who set an NHL record with 16 shots on goal.

Eddie Giacomin again led the league with 8 shutouts, and led the Rangers to second place, bolstered by Jean Ratelle's emergence into stardom.

Boston obtained Phil Esposito, Ken Hodge and Fred Stanfield in a blockbuster trade with Chicago. This trade, as shown over time, heavily favored the Bruins. This, coinciding with the rise of Bobby Orr, led to an improvement in Boston's play, and the Bruins led the league in scoring behind Esposito's 84 points and made the playoffs for the first time in nearly a decade. Though he missed action with a knee injury, Orr still won the Norris Trophy as the league's top defenceman.

By contrast, the Chicago Black Hawks fell into a tailspin, and despite the scoring heroics of Bobby Hull and Stan Mikita, were hard pressed to make the playoffs. Mediocre team defence and goaltending was the culprit. However, they were able to beat the Rangers in the quarter-final round, but lost in the semi-final round to eventual Stanley Cup champion Montreal Canadiens.

Roger Crozier felt the strain of goaltending and walked out on Detroit. He came back, but the Red Wings finished last anyway, despite a potent offense led by Gordie Howe, Alex Delvecchio and Norm Ullman. Even a late season trade of Ullman and Paul Henderson for Toronto star Frank Mahovlich and future Blues star Garry Unger was too little, too late. However, on March 24, 1968, Mahovlich became only the 11th player to score 300 goals as he scored both his 300th and 301st goals in a 5–3 win over the Boston Bruins.

Meanwhile, the defending Cup champion Toronto Maple Leafs, still steady on defence in front of elder statesman Johnny Bower and backup Bruce Gamble, had numerous problems. Mahovlich spent time in hospital with a nervous breakdown, and the season was marred by contract disputes and tension with the high-strung coach, Punch Imlach. A late season charge failed to win a playoff berth.

In the West Division, the Philadelphia Flyers became the first regular season champion of the expansion clubs. While their offense was poor (career minor-league Leon Rochefort led the team with just 21 goals), ex-Bruins' goaltenders Bernie Parent and Doug Favell showed form.

The Los Angeles Kings were a team that writers predicted to finish last in the new West Division. Owner Jack Kent Cooke had purchased the American Hockey League's Springfield Indians for $1 million to bolster the Kings roster. Surprisingly, the Kings finished second, just one point out of first. Bill Flett scored 26 goals, while Eddie Joyal scored 23 goals, adding 34 assists for 57 points and was the second leading scorer in the West Division. Among the expansion teams, the Kings had the best record against the established teams, going 10–12–2 vs. the Eastern Division.

Oakland, predicted to finish first, fell far short of the mark, amidst poor attendance. Defenceman Kent Douglas, a former Calder Memorial Trophy winner, played far below expected form and was traded to Detroit for Ted Hampson and defenceman Bert Marshall. The Seals finished last in the West Division.

Glenn Hall may have been deemed too old by the Black Hawks, which left him unprotected in the expansion draft, but not for the St. Louis Blues, who rode his five shutouts to a third-place finish. A surprising benefit was their leading scorer, previously unheralded Red Berenson (with only 45 points in 185 previous NHL games) who exploded into stardom, more than doubling his career total in only 55 games.

By contrast, the Pittsburgh Penguins finished fifth, led by former Ranger star Andy Bathgate. Behind an elderly roster—nine of their top ten scorers and both of their goaltenders were over thirty—they could neither muster much offense nor defence.

The Minnesota North Stars had their bright moments despite finishing fourth in the West Division. On December 30, 1967, Bill Masterton and Wayne Connelly each scored goals in a 5–4 upset win over the Boston Bruins. On January 10, Connelly—who would finish the season with 35 goals to lead his team and the West Division—had a hat trick in a 6–4 win over the West Division power, the Philadelphia Flyers and Masterton was the architect on all three goals.

Tragedy struck the league on January 13, 1968. In a game at the Metropolitan Sports Center in Bloomington, Minnesota, the Oakland Seals were in town to play the North Stars and Bill Masterton led a rush into the Oakland zone. Two defencemen, Larry Cahan and Ron Harris braced for the old fashioned sandwich check and as Masterton fired the puck into the Seals zone, the two hit Masterton hard but cleanly. Masterton flipped backwards and hit his head on the ice. He was removed to a Minneapolis hospital where doctors were prevented from doing surgery by the seriousness of the head injury. Early on the morning of January 15, 1968, Bill Masterton died. He was the first—and as of 2023, the only—player to die as the direct result of injuries suffered in an NHL game, the only such incident in a senior game since 1907.

=== Final standings ===
Note: GP = Games played, W = Wins, L = Losses, T = Ties, Pts = Points, GF = Goals for, GA = Goals against, PIM = Penalties in minutes
Note: Teams that qualified for the playoffs are highlighted in bold

East Division
| | | GP | W | L | T | GF | GA | DIFF | Pts |
|---|---|---|---|---|---|---|---|---|---|
| **1** | **Montreal Canadiens** | **74** | **42** | **22** | **10** | **236** | **167** | **+69** | **94** |
| **2** | **New York Rangers** | **74** | **39** | **23** | **12** | **226** | **183** | **+43** | **90** |
| **3** | **Boston Bruins** | **74** | **37** | **27** | **10** | **259** | **216** | **+43** | **84** |
| **4** | **Chicago Black Hawks** | **74** | **32** | **26** | **16** | **212** | **222** | **−10** | **80** |
| 5 | Toronto Maple Leafs | 74 | 33 | 31 | 10 | 209 | 176 | +33 | 76 |
| 6 | Detroit Red Wings | 74 | 27 | 35 | 12 | 245 | 257 | −12 | 66 |

West Division
| | | GP | W | L | T | GF | GA | DIFF | Pts |
|---|---|---|---|---|---|---|---|---|---|
| **1** | **Philadelphia Flyers** | **74** | **31** | **32** | **11** | **173** | **179** | **−6** | **73** |
| **2** | **Los Angeles Kings** | **74** | **31** | **33** | **10** | **200** | **224** | **−24** | **72** |
| **3** | **St. Louis Blues** | **74** | **27** | **31** | **16** | **177** | **191** | **−14** | **70** |
| **4** | **Minnesota North Stars** | **74** | **27** | **32** | **15** | **191** | **226** | **−35** | **69** |
| 5 | Pittsburgh Penguins | 74 | 27 | 34 | 13 | 195 | 216 | −21 | 67 |
| 6 | Oakland Seals | 74 | 15 | 42 | 17 | 153 | 219 | −66 | 47 |

== Playoffs ==
=== Playoff bracket ===
Under the new postseason format, the top four teams in each division qualified for the playoffs. In the first round, the first-place vs. third-place and second-place vs. fourth-place playoff format that had been in place for the previous 25 seasons was retained within the East and West Divisions. The two winning teams from each division's first round series then met in the Stanley Cup Semifinals. The two winners of the Semifinals then advanced to the Stanley Cup Finals. This guaranteed that an expansion team would at least reach the Finals, but also highlighted the competitive imbalance between the Original Six teams in the East Division and the expansion teams in the West Division.

In each round, teams competed in a best-of-seven series (scores in the bracket indicate the number of games won in each best-of-seven series).

Quarterfinals
1 | Montreal | 4
3 | Boston | 0
East Division
2 | New York | 2
4 | Chicago | 4
1 | Philadelphia | 3
3 | St. Louis | 4
West Division
2 | Los Angeles | 3
4 | Minnesota | 4

Semifinals
1 | Montreal | 4
4 | Chicago | 1
3 | St. Louis | 4
4 | Minnesota | 3

Stanley Cup Finals
E1 | Montreal | 4
W3 | St. Louis | 0

=== Quarterfinals ===
All series but Bruins-Canadiens had a game postponed after the Assassination of Martin Luther King Jr. on April 4.

The Canadiens drew the third-place Boston Bruins in the first round. The Bruins, making their first appearance in the playoffs since 1959, were swept in four games. In the other East series, the second-place Rangers faced off against the fourth-place Chicago Black Hawks. The Black Hawks, led by Bobby Hull and Stan Mikita defeated the Rangers in six to set up a Montreal-Chicago East Division showdown. The Black Hawks could not provide another upset, and lost to the Canadiens in five games, giving Montreal their only defeat of the playoffs.

In the West, all four teams played their first playoff series. The first-place Philadelphia Flyers lost their first-ever playoff series to the Blues, led by goaltender Glenn Hall and coached by future Hall of Fame coach Scotty Bowman in seven games, while the second-place Los Angeles Kings lost to the fourth-place Minnesota North Stars in seven games. The Blues would defeat the North Stars in seven games to advance to their first final.

==== (E1) Montreal Canadiens vs. (E3) Boston Bruins ====
| April 4 | Boston Bruins | 1–2 | Montreal Canadiens | Montreal Forum | Recap |
| Ken Hodge (1) – 04:00 | | First period | 14:08 – pp – Henri Richard (1) |
| No scoring | | Second period | No scoring |
| No scoring | | Third period | 14:40 – Claude Provost (1) |
| Gerry Cheevers 33 saves / 35 shots | | Goalie stats | Gump Worsley 21 saves / 22 shots |

| April 6 | Boston Bruins | 3–5 | Montreal Canadiens | Montreal Forum | Recap |
| Ken Hodge (2) – 13:58 | | First period | 09:33 – Jacques Lemaire (1) |
| Ted Green (1) – pp – 13:06 | | Second period | 04:15 – Jacques Laperriere (1); 09:24 – Jacques Lemaire (2) |
| John McKenzie (1) – 10:47 | | Third period | 10:24 – Dick Duff (1); 17:34 – Jean Beliveau (1) |
| Gerry Cheevers 36 saves / 41 shots | | Goalie stats | Gump Worsley 17 saves / 20 shots |

| April 9 | Montreal Canadiens | 5–2 | Boston Bruins | Boston Garden | Recap |
| Jean Beliveau (2) – pp – 15:35 | | First period | 05:15 – Ed Westfall (1) |
| Claude Provost (2) – pp – 07:39; Ralph Backstrom (1) – 08:41; John Ferguson (1) – 18:23 | | Second period | 19:55 – Tommy Williams (1) |
| Dick Duff (2) – 08:23 | | Third period | No scoring |
| Gump Worsley 25 saves / 27 shots | | Goalie stats | Gerry Cheevers 28 saves / 33 shots |

| April 11 | Montreal Canadiens | 3–2 | Boston Bruins | Boston Garden | Recap |
| No scoring | | First period | No scoring |
| Claude Larose (1) – 12:58 | | Second period | 00:49 – Ed Westfall (2) |
| Claude Larose (2) – 07:20; Ralph Backstrom (2) – 16:33 | | Third period | 18:34 – Ken Hodge (3) |
| Gump Worsley 35 saves / 37 shots | | Goalie stats | Gerry Cheevers 31 saves / 34 shots |

| Montreal won series 4–0 |

==== (E2) New York Rangers vs. (E4) Chicago Black Hawks ====
| April 4 | Chicago Black Hawks | 1–3 | New York Rangers | Madison Square Garden | Recap |
| No scoring | | First period | 11:22 – Orland Kurtenbach (1) |
| No scoring | | Second period | 07:34 – pp – Harry Howell (1) |
| Pierre Pilote (1) – pp – 12:27 | | Third period | 01:36 – Rod Gilbert (1) |
| Denis DeJordy 41 saves / 44 shots | | Goalie stats | Ed Giacomin 31 saves / 32 shots |

| April 9 | Chicago Black Hawks | 1–2 | New York Rangers | Madison Square Garden | Recap |
| No scoring | | First period | 15:57 – Rod Gilbert (2) |
| Bobby Hull (1) – 10:12 | | Second period | No scoring |
| No scoring | | Third period | 12:40 – Donnie Marshall (1) |
| Denis DeJordy 28 saves / 30 shots | | Goalie stats | Ed Giacomin 36 saves / 37 shots |

| April 11 | New York Rangers | 4–7 | Chicago Black Hawks | Chicago Stadium | Recap |
| Vic Hadfield (1) – pp – 16:47 | | First period | 11:35 – Pit Martin (1) |
| Rod Gilbert (3) – 09:32; Rod Gilbert (4) – 09:38 | | Second period | 08:48 – Stan Mikita (1) |
| Rod Seiling (1) – 13:22 | | Third period | 02:36 – Pit Martin (2); 05:25 – pp – Stan Mikita (2); 08:59 – Dennis Hull (1); 18:19 – Doug Mohns (1); 19:42 – Gilles Marotte (1) |
| Ed Giacomin 24 saves / 31 shots | | Goalie stats | Denis DeJordy 29 saves / 33 shots |

| April 13 | New York Rangers | 1–3 | Chicago Black Hawks | Chicago Stadium | Recap |
| Ron Stewart (1) – 17:20 | | First period | 15:33 – Kenny Wharram (1) |
| No scoring | | Second period | 03:33 – Gilles Marotte (2) |
| No scoring | | Third period | 08:24 – Chico Maki (1) |
| Ed Giacomin 41 saves / 44 shots | | Goalie stats | Denis DeJordy 37 saves / 38 shots |

| April 14 | Chicago Black Hawks | 2–1 | New York Rangers | Madison Square Garden | Recap |
| Donnie Marshall (2) – 05:20 | | First period | 16:14 – pp – Bobby Hull (2) |
| No scoring | | Second period | No scoring |
| Bobby Schmautz (1) – 16:46 | | Third period | No scoring |
| Denis DeJordy 32 saves / 33 shots | | Goalie stats | Ed Giacomin 27 saves / 29 shots |

| April 16 | New York Rangers | 1–4 | Chicago Black Hawks | Chicago Stadium | Recap |
| No scoring | | First period | 05:50 – Doug Jarrett (1) |
| Rod Gilbert (5) – 03:15 | | Second period | 19:25 – Chico Maki (2) |
| No scoring | | Third period | 02:39 – Pit Martin (3); 16:35 – Stan Mikita (3) |
| Ed Giacomin 25 saves / 29 shots | | Goalie stats | Denis DeJordy 26 saves / 27 shots |

| Chicago won series 4–2 |

==== (W1) Philadelphia Flyers vs. (W3) St. Louis Blues ====
| April 4 | St. Louis Blues | 1–0 | Philadelphia Flyers | Spectrum | Recap |
| No scoring | | First period | No scoring |
| No scoring | | Second period | No scoring |
| Jimmy Roberts (1) – 14:13 | | Third period | No scoring |
| Glenn Hall 14 saves / 14 shots | | Goalie stats | Bernie Parent 32 saves / 33 shots |

| April 6 | St. Louis Blues | 3–4 | Philadelphia Flyers | Spectrum | Recap |
| Dickie Moore (1) – 07:11 | | First period | 01:32 – Pat Hannigan (1); 18:37 – pp – Don Blackburn (1); 19:10 – Claude Laforge (1) |
| Don McKenney (1) – 04:22; Larry Keenan (1) – 05:46 | | Second period | No scoring |
| No scoring | | Third period | 06:51 – Leon Rochefort (1) |
| Glenn Hall 37 saves / 41 shots | | Goalie stats | Doug Favell 26 saves / 29 shots |

| April 10 | Philadelphia Flyers | 2–3 | 2OT | St. Louis Blues | St. Louis Arena | Recap |
| No scoring | | First period | | No scoring |
| Jean Gauthier (1) – pp – 17:35 | | Second period | | 02:54 – Terry Crisp (1) |
| Joe Watson (1) – 13:54 | | Third period | | 07:38 – Frank St. Marseille (1) |
| No scoring | | Second overtime period | | 04:10 – Larry Keenan (2) |
| Bernie Parent 54 saves / 57 shots | | Goalie stats | | Glenn Hall 33 saves / 35 shots |

| April 11 | Philadelphia Flyers | 2–5 | St. Louis Blues | St. Louis Arena | Recap |
| Andre Lacroix (1) – pp – 02:26 | | First period | 06:52 – sh – Bill McCreary Sr. (1); 13:29 – pp – Red Berenson (1) |
| No scoring | | Second period | 16:55 – Dickie Moore (2) |
| Don Blackburn (2) – 14:04 | | Third period | 00:49 – Red Berenson (2); 16:05 – sh – Barclay Plager (1) |
| Doug Favell 28 saves / 33 shots | | Goalie stats | Glenn Hall 22 saves / 24 shots |

| April 13 | St. Louis Blues | 1–6 | Philadelphia Flyers | Spectrum | Recap |
| No scoring | | First period | 09:01 – Leon Rochefort (2); 13:18 – Rosaire Paiement (1); 15:52 – sh – Forbes Kennedy (1) |
| No scoring | | Second period | 17:00 – Brit Selby (1) |
| Gerry Melnyk (1) – sh – 11:05 | | Third period | 10:27 – pp – Rosaire Paiement (2); 13:26 – pp – Rosaire Paiement (3) |
| Glenn Hall 9 saves / 12 shots Seth Martin 17 saves / 20 shots | | Goalie stats | Bernie Parent 30 saves / 31 shots |

| April 16 | Philadelphia Flyers | 2–1 | 2OT | St. Louis Blues | St. Louis Arena | Recap |
| No scoring | | First period | | 18:06 – pp – Gerry Melnyk (2) |
| No scoring | | Second period | | No scoring |
| Andre Lacroix (2) – 19:45 | | Third period | | No scoring |
| Don Blackburn (3) – 11:18 | | Second overtime period | | No scoring |
| Bernie Parent 63 saves / 64 shots | | Goalie stats | | Glenn Hall 41 saves / 43 shots |

| April 18 | St. Louis Blues | 3–1 | Philadelphia Flyers | Spectrum | Recap |
| Frank St. Marseille (2) – pp – 07:38 | | First period | 18:25 – pp – Bill Sutherland (1) |
| Larry Keenan (3) – pp – 10:45 | | Second period | No scoring |
| Red Berenson (3) – 19:10 | | Third period | No scoring |
| Glenn Hall 26 saves / 27 shots | | Goalie stats | Bernie Parent 28 saves / 30 shots |

| St. Louis won series 4–3 |

==== (W2) Los Angeles Kings vs. (W4) Minnesota North Stars ====
| April 4 | Minnesota North Stars | 1–2 | Los Angeles Kings | The Forum | Recap |
| No scoring | | First period | No scoring |
| No scoring | | Second period | 19:55 – pp – Eddie Joyal (1) |
| Dave Balon (1) – 03:54 | | Third period | 03:13 – Bill White (1) |
| Cesare Maniago 38 saves / 40 shots | | Goalie stats | Terry Sawchuck 30 saves / 31 shots |

| April 6 | Minnesota North Stars | 0–2 | Los Angeles Kings | The Forum | Recap |
| No scoring | | First period | 08:45 – pp – Lowell MacDonald (1) |
| No scoring | | Second period | 18:12 – Eddie Joyal (2) |
| No scoring | | Third period | No scoring |
| Cesare Maniago 37 saves / 39 shots | | Goalie stats | Terry Sawchuck 18 saves / 18 shots |

| April 9 | Los Angeles Kings | 5–7 | Minnesota North Stars | Met Center | Recap |
| Lowell MacDonald (2) – 12:44; Lowell MacDonald (3) – 13:56; Howie Hughes (1) – pp – 15:19 | | First period | 05:51 – Bill Collins (1); 15:48 – Ray Cullen (1); 17:34 – pp – Mike McMahon Jr. (1) |
| No scoring | | Second period | 01:25 – Parker MacDonald (1); 16:56 – ps – Wayne Connelly (1) |
| Ted Irvine (1) – 03:23; Doug Robinson (1) – 04:15 | | Third period | 00:09 – Bill Collins (2); 17:50 – Andre Boudrias (1) |
| Terry Sawchuck 18 saves / 23 shots Wayne Rutledge 9 saves / 11 shots | | Goalie stats | Cesare Maniago 24 saves / 29 shots |

| April 11 | Los Angeles Kings | 2–3 | Minnesota North Stars | Met Center | Recap |
| Bill Flett (1) – 03:37; Bill White (2) – 04:45 | | First period | 11:30 – pp – Ray Cullen (2) |
| No scoring | | Second period | 06:31 – Mike McMahon Jr. (2); 09:27 – Dave Balon (2) |
| No scoring | | Third period | No scoring |
| Terry Sawchuck 31 saves / 34 shots | | Goalie stats | Cesare Maniago 30 saves / 32 shots |

| April 13 | Minnesota North Stars | 2–3 | Los Angeles Kings | The Forum | Recap |
| No scoring | | First period | 02:14 – Gord Labossiere (1); 02:29 – Gord Labossiere (2) |
| No scoring | | Second period | 12:23 – pp – Eddie Joyal (3) |
| Wayne Connelly (2) – 07:15; Wayne Connelly (3) – 14:55 | | Third period | No scoring |
| Cesare Maniago 21 saves / 24 shots | | Goalie stats | Wayne Rutledge 27 saves / 29 shots |

| April 16 | Los Angeles Kings | 3–4 | OT | Minnesota North Stars | Met Center | Recap |
| Doug Robinson (2) – 11:12 | | First period | | 08:05 – sh – Mike McMahon Jr. (3) |
| Real Lemieux (1) – 01:37; Howie Hughes (2) – 04:20 | | Second period | | No scoring |
| No scoring | | Third period | | 07:23 – Bill Goldsworthy (1); 16:39 – Bob McCord (1) |
| No scoring | | First overtime period | | 09:11 – Milan Marcetta (1) |
| Wayne Rutledge 29 saves / 33 shots | | Goalie stats | | Cesare Maniago 33 saves / 36 shots |

| April 18 | Minnesota North Stars | 9–4 | Los Angeles Kings | The Forum | Recap |
| Parker MacDonald (2) – 02:24; Wayne Connelly (4) – pp – 08:05; Bill Goldsworthy (2) – 16:25 | | First period | 02:51 – Doug Robinson (3) |
| Milan Marcetta (2) – 08:45; Parker MacDonald (3) – 11:58; Milan Marcetta (3) – 12:49; Dave Balon (3) – 15:58; Andre Boudrias (2) – 16:12 | | Second period | 05:12 – pp – Eddie Joyal (4); 16:45 – Poul Popiel (1) |
| Bill Goldsworthy (3) – pp – 09:07 | | Third period | 19:36 – Doug Robinson (4) |
| Cesare Maniago 22 saves / 26 shots | | Goalie stats | Terry Sawchuck 24 saves / 33 shots |

| Minnesota won series 4–3 |

=== Semifinals ===
==== (E1) Montreal Canadiens vs. (E4) Chicago Black Hawks ====
| April 18 | Chicago Black Hawks | 2–9 | Montreal Canadiens | Montreal Forum | Recap |
| No scoring | | First period | 06:37 – Ralph Backstrom (3); 07:31 – Yvan Cournoyer (1); 09:24 – John Ferguson (2) |
| No scoring | | Second period | 15:26 – pp – Yvan Cournoyer (2) |
| Doug Jarrett (2) – 10:20; Gilles Marotte (3) – 11:26 | | Third period | 00:10 – John Ferguson (3); 01:28 – Gilles Tremblay (1); 07:08 – Jacques Lemaire (3); 16:03 – Jean Beliveau (3); 17:50 – Claude Larose (3) |
| Denis DeJordy 24 saves / 33 shots | | Goalie stats | Gump Worsley 32 saves / 34 shots |

| April 20 | Chicago Black Hawks | 1–4 | Montreal Canadiens | Montreal Forum | Recap |
| Stan Mikita (4) – pp – 05:03 | | First period | 10:58 – Jean Beliveau (4) |
| No scoring | | Second period | 10:04 – pp – Jean Beliveau (5); 15:41 – pp – Jacques Lemaire (4); 17:57 – pp – Jean Beliveau (6) |
| No scoring | | Third period | No scoring |
| Denis DeJordy 35 saves / 39 shots | | Goalie stats | Gump Worsley 23 saves / 24 shots |

| April 23 | Montreal Canadiens | 4–2 | Chicago Black Hawks | Chicago Stadium | Recap |
| Jean Beliveau (7) – 00:39 | | First period | 15:25 – Doug Jarrett (3) |
| Yvan Cournoyer (3) – pp – 02:39; Yvan Cournoyer (4) – 06:11; J. C. Tremblay (1) – 12:05 | | Second period | 10:35 – Doug Jarrett (4) |
| No scoring | | Third period | No scoring |
| Gump Worsley 39 saves / 41 shots | | Goalie stats | Denis DeJordy 29 saves / 33 shots |

| April 25 | Montreal Canadiens | 1–2 | Chicago Black Hawks | Chicago Stadium | Recap |
| No scoring | | First period | 08:57 – Bobby Hull (3) |
| Henri Richard (2) – 03:37 | | Second period | 06:50 – sh – Bobby Hull (4) |
| No scoring | | Third period | No scoring |
| Gump Worsley 3 saves / 4 shots Rogie Vachon 29 saves / 30 shots | | Goalie stats | Denis DeJordy 28 saves / 29 shots |

| April 28 | Chicago Black Hawks | 3–4 | OT | Montreal Canadiens | Montreal Forum | Recap |
| No scoring | | First period | | 08:10 – Bobby Rousseau (1) |
| Bobby Schmautz (2) – 09:59 | | Second period | | 11:15 – sh – J. C. Tremblay (2) |
| Stan Mikita (5) – pp – 01:23; Wayne Maki (1) – 08:14 | | Third period | | 06:38 – pp – Jacques Lemaire (5) |
| No scoring | | First overtime period | | 02:14 – Jacques Lemaire (6) |
| Denis DeJordy 40 saves / 44 shots | | Goalie stats | | Rogie Vachon 24 saves / 27 shots |

| Montreal won series 4–1 |

==== (W3) St. Louis Blues vs. (W4) Minnesota North Stars ====
| April 21 | Minnesota North Stars | 3–5 | St. Louis Blues | St. Louis Arena | Recap |
| Milan Marcetta (4) – pp – 07:49 | | First period | 14:27 – Tim Ecclestone (1) |
| Wayne Connelly (5) – 00:49; Wayne Connelly (6) – pp – 15:41 | | Second period | 09:31 – pp – Frank St. Marseille (3); 10:05 – pp – Dickie Moore (3); 12:36 – sh – Bill McCreary Sr. (2) |
| No scoring | | Third period | 14:08 – Larry Keenan (4) |
| Cesare Maniago 28 saves / 33 shots | | Goalie stats | Glenn Hall 25 saves / 28 shots |

| April 22 | St. Louis Blues | 2–3 | OT | Minnesota North Stars | Met Center | Recap |
| Jimmy Roberts (2) – 12:28 | | First period | | No scoring |
| No scoring | | Second period | | No scoring |
| Frank St. Marseille (4) – pp – 04:58 | | Third period | | 02:12 – Milan Marcetta (5); 07:00 – Bill Goldsworthy (4) |
| No scoring | | First overtime period | | 03:41 – Parker MacDonald (4) |
| Glenn Hall 24 saves / 27 shots | | Goalie stats | | Cesare Maniago 23 saves / 25 shots |

| April 25 | Minnesota North Stars | 5–1 | St. Louis Blues | St. Louis Arena | Recap |
| Milan Marcetta (6) – 09:38; Bill Goldsworthy (5) – 13:00; J. P. Parise (1) – 19:01 | | First period | No scoring |
| Bill Goldsworthy (6) – 16:33 | | Second period | 04:53 – Dickie Moore (4) |
| Dave Balon (4) – pp – 00:09 | | Third period | No scoring |
| Cesare Maniago 30 saves / 31 shots | | Goalie stats | Glenn Hall 16 saves / 21 shots |

| April 27 | Minnesota North Stars | 3–4 | OT | St. Louis Blues | St. Louis Arena | Recap |
| Walt McKechnie (1) – 04:42; J. P. Parise (2) – pp – 14:40 | | First period | | No scoring |
| Wayne Connelly (7) – 19:37 | | Second period | | No scoring |
| No scoring | | Third period | | 11:57 – Jimmy Roberts (3); 12:57 – Dickie Moore (5); 19:49 – Jimmy Roberts (4) |
| No scoring | | First overtime period | | 01:32 – Gary Sabourin (1) |
| Cesare Maniago 39 saves / 43 shots | | Goalie stats | | Glenn Hall 21 saves / 24 shots |

| April 29 | Minnesota North Stars | 2–3 | OT | St. Louis Blues | St. Louis Arena | Recap |
| Walt McKechnie (2) – 05:39 | | First period | | 01:53 – Bob Plager (1); 10:44 – Gary Sabourin (2) |
| Bob McCord (2) – 06:31 | | Second period | | No scoring |
| No scoring | | Third period | | No scoring |
| No scoring | | First overtime period | | 17:27 – Bill McCreary Sr. (3) |
| Cesare Maniago 52 saves / 55 shots | | Goalie stats | | Glenn Hall 26 saves / 28 shots |

| May 1 | St. Louis Blues | 1–5 | Minnesota North Stars | Met Center | Recap |
| No scoring | | First period | 05:28 – pp – Wayne Connelly (8); 10:54 – Andre Boudrias (3) |
| Gary Sabourin (3) – 13:53 | | Second period | 06:34 – Bill Goldsworthy (7); 17:16 – Bill Goldsworthy (8) |
| No scoring | | Third period | 09:52 – Milan Marcetta (7) |
| Glenn Hall 12 saves / 15 shots Seth Martin 21 saves / 23 shots | | Goalie stats | Cesare Maniago 22 saves / 23 shots |

| May 3 | Minnesota North Stars | 1–2 | 2OT | St. Louis Blues | St. Louis Arena | Recap |
| No scoring | | First period | | No scoring |
| No scoring | | Second period | | No scoring |
| Walt McKechnie (3) – 16:49 | | Third period | | 17:20 – Dickie Moore (6) |
| No scoring | | Second overtime period | | 02:50 – Ron Schock (1) |
| Cesare Maniago 36 saves / 38 shots | | Goalie stats | | Glenn Hall 44 saves / 45 shots |

| St. Louis won series 4–3 |

=== Stanley Cup Finals ===
The Blues faced the Canadiens for the Stanley Cup. Blues coach Bowman, a long-time member of the Canadiens organization was unable to spur the Blues to an upset, but they made it a hard-fought series, with each game being decided by one goal and two going to overtime. However, the Canadiens, led by Jean Beliveau and Henri Richard, were not to be denied and swept the series in four games. Despite this, the exceptional performance of the heavy underdog Blues impressed and surprised most hockey fans who were expecting an utter blowout by the Canadiens, to the point that their goaltender Glenn Hall, who helped lead the team to the Cup Finals, was named the MVP of the playoffs.

| May 5 | Montreal Canadiens | 3–2 | OT | St. Louis Blues | St. Louis Arena | Recap |
| Henri Richard (3) – 09:42 | | First period | | 09:19 – Barclay Plager (2) |
| Yvan Cournoyer (5) – 18:14 | | Second period | | 08:16 – pp – Dickie Moore (7) |
| No scoring | | Third period | | No scoring |
| Jacques Lemaire (7) – 01:41 | | First overtime period | | No scoring |
| Gump Worsley 34 saves / 36 shots | | Goalie stats | | Glenn Hall 35 saves / 38 shots |

| May 7 | Montreal Canadiens | 1–0 | St. Louis Blues | St. Louis Arena | Recap |
| No scoring | | First period | No scoring |
| No scoring | | Second period | No scoring |
| Serge Savard (1) – sh – 02:17 | | Third period | No scoring |
| Gump Worsley 19 saves / 19 shots | | Goalie stats | Glenn Hall 35 saves / 36 shots |

| May 9 | St. Louis Blues | 3–4 | OT | Montreal Canadiens | Montreal Forum | Recap |
| Frank St. Marseille (5) – pp – 10:22 | | First period | | 14:24 – pp – Yvan Cournoyer (6) |
| Red Berenson (4) – 03:37 | | Second period | | 01:23 – sh – Serge Savard (2) |
| Red Berenson (5) – sh – 17:25 | | Third period | | 11:43 – Ralph Backstrom (4) |
| No scoring | | First overtime period | | 01:13 – Bobby Rousseau (2) |
| Glenn Hall 42 saves / 46 shots | | Goalie stats | | Gump Worsley 12 saves / 15 shots |

| May 11 | St. Louis Blues | 2–3 | Montreal Canadiens | Montreal Forum | Recap |
| No scoring | | First period | 16:47 – Dick Duff (3) |
| Craig Cameron (1) – 06:53; Gary Sabourin (4) – pp – 07:50 | | Second period | No scoring |
| No scoring | | Third period | 07:24 – Henri Richard (4); 11:40 – J. C. Tremblay (3) |
| Glenn Hall 28 saves / 31 shots | | Goalie stats | Gump Worsley 19 saves / 21 shots |

| Montreal won series 4–0 |

== Awards ==
1967–68 NHL awards
| Prince of Wales Trophy: (East Division champion, regular season) | Montreal Canadiens |
| Clarence S. Campbell Bowl: (West Division champion, regular season) | Philadelphia Flyers |
| Art Ross Trophy: (Top scorer, regular season) | Stan Mikita, Chicago Black Hawks |
| Bill Masterton Memorial Trophy: (Perseverance, sportsmanship, and dedication) | Claude Provost, Montreal Canadiens |
| Calder Memorial Trophy: (Top first-year player) | Derek Sanderson, Boston Bruins |
| Conn Smythe Trophy: (Most valuable player, playoffs) | Glenn Hall, St. Louis Blues |
| Hart Memorial Trophy: (Most valuable player, regular season) | Stan Mikita, Chicago Black Hawks |
| James Norris Memorial Trophy: (Best defenceman) | Bobby Orr, Boston Bruins |
| Lady Byng Memorial Trophy: (Excellence and sportsmanship) | Stan Mikita, Chicago Black Hawks |
| Vezina Trophy: (Best goaltending record, regular season) | Rogatien Vachon and Gump Worsley, Montreal Canadiens |

=== All-Star teams ===
| First Team | Position | Second Team |
|---|---|---|
| Gump Worsley, Montreal Canadiens | G | Ed Giacomin, New York Rangers |
| Bobby Orr, Boston Bruins | D | J. C. Tremblay, Montreal Canadiens |
| Tim Horton, Toronto Maple Leafs | D | Jim Neilson, New York Rangers |
| Stan Mikita, Chicago Black Hawks | C | Phil Esposito, Boston Bruins |
| Gordie Howe, Detroit Red Wings | RW | Rod Gilbert, New York Rangers |
| Bobby Hull, Chicago Black Hawks | LW | Johnny Bucyk, Boston Bruins |

== Player statistics ==
=== Scoring leaders ===
Note: GP = Games played; G Goals; A = Assists; Pts = Points; PIM = Penalty minutes

| Player | Team | GP | G | A | PTS | PIM |
|---|---|---|---|---|---|---|
| Stan Mikita | Chicago Black Hawks | 72 | 40 | 47 | 87 | 14 |
| Phil Esposito | Boston Bruins | 74 | 35 | 49 | 84 | 21 |
| Gordie Howe | Detroit Red Wings | 74 | 39 | 43 | 82 | 53 |
| Jean Ratelle | New York Rangers | 74 | 32 | 46 | 78 | 18 |
| Rod Gilbert | New York Rangers | 73 | 29 | 48 | 77 | 12 |
| Bobby Hull | Chicago Black Hawks | 71 | 44 | 31 | 75 | 39 |
| Norm Ullman | Toronto Maple Leafs | 71 | 35 | 37 | 72 | 28 |
| Alex Delvecchio | Detroit Red Wings | 74 | 22 | 48 | 70 | 14 |
| Johnny Bucyk | Boston Bruins | 72 | 30 | 39 | 69 | 8 |
| Kenny Wharram | Chicago Black Hawks | 74 | 27 | 42 | 69 | 18 |

Source: NHL.

=== Leading goaltenders ===
Note: GP = Games played; Min = Minutes played; GA = Goals against; GAA = Goals against average; W = Wins; L = Losses; T = Ties; SO = Shutouts

| Player | Team | GP | MIN | GA | GAA | W | L | T | SO |
|---|---|---|---|---|---|---|---|---|---|
| Gump Worsley | Montreal Canadiens | 40 | 2213 | 73 | 1.98 | 19 | 9 | 8 | 6 |
| Johnny Bower | Toronto Maple Leafs | 43 | 2239 | 84 | 2.25 | 14 | 18 | 7 | 4 |
| Doug Favell | Philadelphia Flyers | 37 | 2192 | 83 | 2.27 | 15 | 15 | 6 | 4 |
| Bruce Gamble | Toronto Maple Leafs | 41 | 2204 | 85 | 2.32 | 19 | 13 | 3 | 5 |
| Eddie Giacomin | New York Rangers | 66 | 3940 | 160 | 2.44 | 36 | 20 | 10 | 8 |
| Glenn Hall | St. Louis Blues | 49 | 2858 | 118 | 2.48 | 19 | 21 | 9 | 5 |
| Rogie Vachon | Montreal Canadiens | 39 | 2227 | 92 | 2.48 | 23 | 13 | 2 | 4 |
| Bernie Parent | Philadelphia Flyers | 38 | 2248 | 93 | 2.48 | 16 | 17 | 5 | 4 |
| Seth Martin | St. Louis Blues | 30 | 1552 | 67 | 2.59 | 8 | 10 | 7 | 1 |
| Denis DeJordy | Chicago Black Hawks | 50 | 2838 | 128 | 2.71 | 23 | 15 | 11 | 4 |

=== Other statistics ===
The NHL began tracking the plus-minus statistic this season. It measures the difference between the number of goals scored by a player's team while a player is on the ice against the number of goals scored by the opposing team. Power play goals do not count toward the statistic; it does include short-handed goals scored by the opposing team during power plays.

- Plus-Minus leader: Dallas Smith, Boston Bruins

== Coaches ==
=== East ===
- Boston Bruins: Harry Sinden
- Chicago Black Hawks: Billy Reay
- Detroit Red Wings: Sid Abel
- Montreal Canadiens: Toe Blake
- New York Rangers: Emile Francis
- Toronto Maple Leafs: Punch Imlach

=== West ===
- Los Angeles Kings: Red Kelly
- Minnesota North Stars: Wren Blair
- Oakland Seals: Bert Olmstead and Gord Fashoway
- Philadelphia Flyers: Keith Allen
- Pittsburgh Penguins: George "Red" Sullivan
- St. Louis Blues: Lynn Patrick and Scotty Bowman

== Debuts ==
The following is a list of notable players who played their first NHL game in 1967–68 (listed with their first team, asterisk(*) marks debut in playoffs):

- Bobby Schmautz, Chicago Black Hawks
- Bill White, Los Angeles Kings
- Walt McKechnie, Minnesota North Stars
- Mickey Redmond, Montreal Canadiens
- Jacques Lemaire, Montreal Canadiens
- Garry Monahan, Montreal Canadiens
- Walt Tkaczuk, New York Rangers
- Dennis Hextall*, New York Rangers
- Simon Nolet, Philadelphia Flyers
- Barclay Plager, St. Louis Blues
- Garry Unger, Toronto Maple Leafs

== Last games ==
The following is a list of notable players who played their last game in the NHL in 1967–68 (listed with their last team):

- Bill Masterton, Minnesota North Stars
- Bronco Horvath, Minnesota North Stars
- Bernie Geoffrion, New York Rangers
- Dickie Moore, St. Louis Blues
- Don McKenney, St. Louis Blues
- Al MacNeil. Pittsburgh Penguins

== Broadcasting ==
Hockey Night in Canada on CBC Television televised Saturday night regular season games and Stanley Cup playoff games. HNIC also produced Wednesday night regular season game telecasts for CTV. Games were typically not broadcast in their entirety until the 1968–69 season, and were typically joined in progress.

This was the second season under the U.S. rights agreement with CBS. This season, CBS aired Saturday afternoon games between December 30 and January 20, then Sunday afternoon games from January 28 through March. The network then aired Sunday afternoon playoff games.

== See also ==
- 1967–68 NHL transactions
- 1967 NHL Expansion
- List of Stanley Cup champions
- 1967 NHL amateur draft
- 1967 NHL expansion draft
- 21st National Hockey League All-Star Game
- National Hockey League All-Star Game
- Ice hockey at the 1968 Winter Olympics
- 1967 in sports
- 1968 in sports
