= Gump Worsley =

Canadian ice hockey player (1929–2007)

- Hockey Hall of Fame, 1980
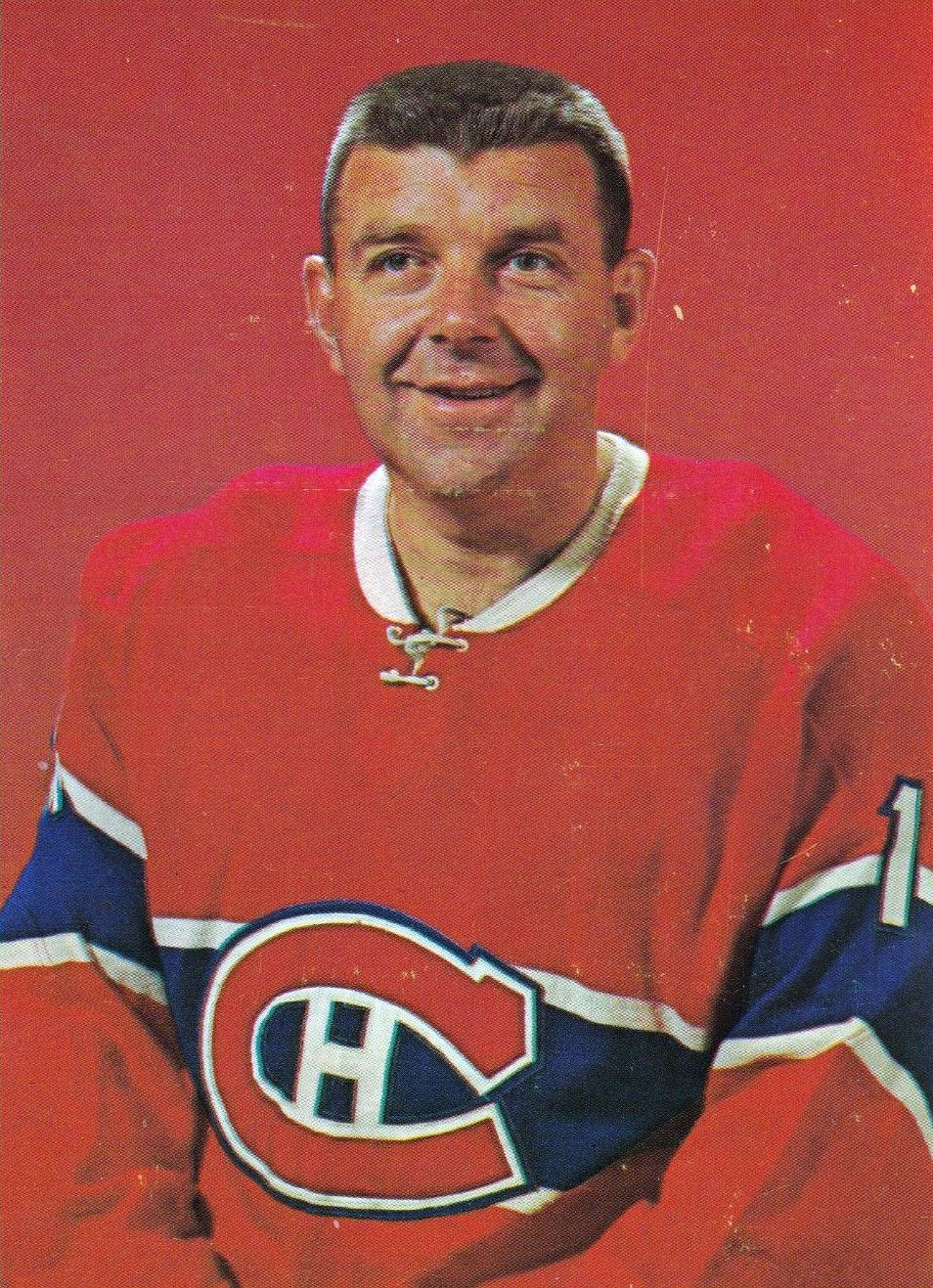
- Worsley with the Montreal Canadiens, c. 1963
- Born: May 14, 1929 Montreal, Quebec, Canada
- Died: January 26, 2007 (aged 77) Beloeil, Quebec, Canada
- Height: 5 ft 7 in (170 cm)
- Weight: 180 lb (82 kg; 12 st 12 lb)
- Position: Goaltender
- Caught: Left
- Played for: New York Rangers; Montreal Canadiens; Minnesota North Stars
- Playing career: 1952–1974

Lorne John "Gump" Worsley (May 14, 1929 – January 26, 2007) was a Canadian professional ice hockey goaltender. Born and raised in Montreal, Quebec, 'Gump' was given his nickname because friends thought he looked like a comic-strip character Andy Gump.

He spent the first seven seasons of his hockey career in various minor leagues before joining the NHL in 1952 with the New York Rangers. He won the Calder Memorial Trophy for his play as a rookie for a team that finished in last place. He was demoted for the following season for trying to ask for a pay raise only to return to the NHL in 1954, where he would spend the next nine years; in ten seasons for New York, they reached the postseason four times. He was traded to the Montreal Canadiens in the summer of 1963. With Montreal, he would go 29–7 in the postseason that saw the Canadiens win the Stanley Cup four times (1965, 1966, 1968, 1969). In tandem with Charlie Hodge for the 1965–66 season and Rogie Vachon for the 1967–68 season, Worsley won the Vezina Trophy for allowing the fewest number of goals during the regular season.

Disputes with management led to his benching and subsequent trade to the Minnesota North Stars late in the 1969–70 season. On March 29, 1970, he became the sixth goaltender to win 300 games. He played regularly for the team until 1974, when he retired at the age of 44. He was inducted into the Hockey Hall of Fame in 1980.

== Career ==
Worsley played his first four years as a professional in the minor leagues, most notably for the New York Rovers of the Eastern Hockey League (EHL), the St. Paul Saints of the United States Hockey League (USHL), and the Saskatoon Quakers of the Western Hockey League (WHL). Between 1950 and 1952 he was named to the First All-Star Team three times and led the league in goaltending.

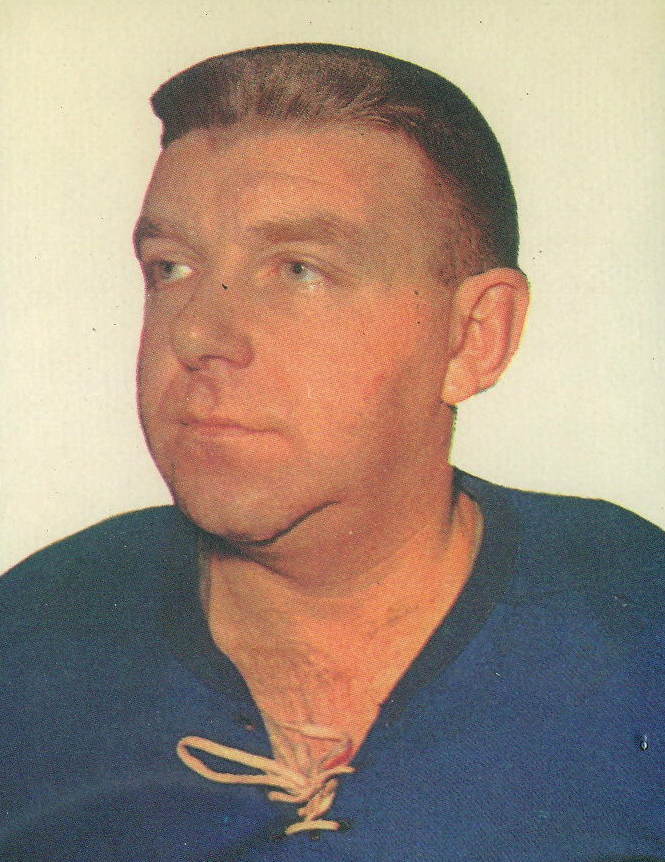
Photo with New York, 1962

In the fall of 1952 he was signed by the New York Rangers of the NHL. Although he played for a last-place team, he won the Calder Memorial Trophy as rookie of the year. However, after asking for a pay increase of $500 a year, he was sent back down to the minor leagues the following season. In 1953-54, playing for the Vancouver Canucks of the WHL, he won the league's most valuable player award.

In 1954-55, Worsley returned to the Rangers, replacing Johnny Bower. He toiled for the Rangers for the next nine seasons, generally playing well for a poor team. In the 1955–56 New York Rangers season opener against the Chicago Blackhawks, Worsley made 43 saves, setting a franchise record. In that season, he set a new league record for most shots allowed (2,574) and most saves (2,376), both of which remain NHL records.

In the summer of 1963, Worsley became involved in the establishment of a players' union, and the Rangers promptly traded him to the Montreal Canadiens. He spent much of the next two seasons in the American Hockey League with the Quebec Aces and was named to the AHL's First All-Star Team in 1964. Returning to the NHL, Worsley played his best years for the Canadiens as the team won the Stanley Cup in 1965, 1966, 1968 and 1969. His best season was 1968, when he won the Vezina Trophy, attained a goals-against average of 1.98 — the lowest in his career — and earned eleven straight wins in the playoffs. In 1969–70, however, he had a dispute with general manager Sam Pollock over being demoted to the minors, and head coach Claude Ruel's decision to favor Rogatien Vachon made Worsley quit in the middle of the season. Pollock suggested Worsley accept a two-week conditioning stint to work his way back to the Canadiens, but the veteran netminder refused. Worsley was suspended for not reporting to the Canadiens' Montreal Voyageurs farm team and told Pollock he intended to retire.

Later in the season, however, the Minnesota North Stars expressed interest in Worsley, and the Canadiens traded him for future considerations on February 27, 1970. He starred with Minnesota for most of the following five years; his best season with the team was 1972, when he came second in the league with a 2.12 goals-against average and was named to play in the 25th National Hockey League All-Star Game. He retired after the 1973–74 season at the age of 44. Worsley was the second goaltender to win 300 games and lose 300 games, after Harry Lumley.

Worsley was known for his wry sense of humour and various eccentricities. Early in his career with the lacklustre Rangers, regularly facing 40 to 50 shots a night, he was asked: "Which team gives you the most trouble?" His reply: "The New York Rangers." Accused by Rangers' coach Phil Watson of having a beer belly, he replied, "Just goes to show you what he knows. I only drink Johnnie Walker Red."

Worsley refused to wear a mask long after almost all other goaltenders adopted one. He was the second-to-last professional hockey goaltender to play without a mask; Andy Brown of the WHA's Indianapolis Racers was the last. Worsley finally put one on in the last six games of his career. Asked why he never wore a mask, Worsley told reporters: "My face is my mask."

Worsley was also well known for his fear of flying. On November 25, 1968, en route to Los Angeles, he suffered a nervous breakdown after a rough flight from Montreal's Dorval Airport to Chicago. It has been reported that a stewardess upon landing came over the PA system and said that if passengers wished to claim refunds for drycleaning they should submit receipts. Worsley is reported to have quipped, "Does that include underwear?" Later, he received psychiatric treatment and missed action. It is said upon emerging from retirement to play for the North Stars he was assured, as Minnesota was in the middle of the continent, the team travelled less than any other in the league.

=== Soccer career ===
Worsley was an excellent soccer player, beginning his career as a junior with Westmount. In 1948 he was a member of the Montreal youth all-star team. As a promising young player, he soon attracted attention; the following year he moved up to McMasterville in the Montreal League. There he was selected to play in a trial game from which the Montreal all-stars were chosen to play the touring English club Fulham FC on May 29, 1951 (the game was drawn 2-2).

In the summer of 1952, while a member of the Saskatoon Quakers, he played centre forward for the Saskatoon All-stars against the touring Tottenham Hotspur football club from England. In 1953, he joined Montréal Hakoah FC and helped his new club to the Canadian final, but they lost the three-game series to the Westminster Royals. In 1954, he played with Montreal Vickers. His father was also an outstanding soccer player and won a Canadian championship medal with Montreal Grand Trunk in 1919.

=== Injuries ===
Worsley suffered many injuries during his career. While with Vancouver of the WHL, he sustained a back injury that nearly ended his career when Gus Kyle hit him from behind. He also suffered a knee problem in the 1956 playoffs that required surgery; a severed tendon in 1960; a blistering shot from Bobby Hull that hit him in the forehead in 1961; a pulled hamstring that same year; another pulled hamstring in 1963–64; knee surgery in 1966; a sprained knee, then a concussion from a hard-boiled egg thrown by a New York fan; a broken finger in the 1969 playoffs; a pulled hamstring in 1972–73 that forced his temporary retirement. The blast to the forehead from Bobby Hull knocked him unconscious and sent him to Montreal's Royal Victoria Hospital. Upon awakening, asked how he was feeling, Gump replied: "Good thing the puck hit me flat!"

== Retirement and death ==
At the time of his retirement, Worsley had played more games than any goalie except Terry Sawchuk and Glenn Hall. He retired with a record of 335 wins, 352 losses and 150 ties, 43 shutouts, and a goals-against average of 2.91.

Worsley suffered a heart attack on January 22, 2007, and died at Hôpital Honoré-Mercier in Saint-Hyacinthe, Quebec on January 26, 2007. He was survived by his wife, Doreen Chapman and his children Lorne, Dean, Drew, and Lianne.

== Legacy ==
Two Canadian indie rock bands recorded tributes to Worsley — Huevos Rancheros released "Gump Worsley's Lament" and The Weakerthans released "Elegy for Gump Worsley". Canadian band Sons of Freedom named their second album Gump after Worsley. In the TV series Law & Order: Criminal Intent a property management company is named "Gump and Worsley." And in the hit 1991 comedy Wayne's World, writer and star Mike Myers - playing Wayne Campbell - refers to his friend Garth Algar (played by Dana Carvey) as Gump Worsley during a game of street hockey, saying, "Gump Worsley cuts down the angle", before their game is interrupted by a passing motorist and the iconic "CAR!" line is uttered.

== Career achievements and facts ==
- Won the Calder Memorial Trophy in 1953.
- Stanley Cup champion in 1965, 1966, 1968, and 1969.
- Won the Vezina Trophy in 1966 and 1968.
- Named to the NHL First All-Star Team in 1968.
- Named to the NHL Second All-Star Team in 1966.
- Played in the NHL All-Star Game in 1961, 1962, 1965, and 1972.
- 5th most career losses, 13th in all-time games played, 28th in career wins and 43rd in shutouts.
- Inducted into the Hockey Hall of Fame in 1980.
- The last goaltender to play in the NHL without a face mask, doing so until his last six games. (Andy Brown continued to play without one in the WHA for some time thereafter.)
- Was affectionately known to Minnesota North Stars fans as "the Gumper".
- The term "stacking the Gumpers," denoting the way a goaltender makes a save by lying on his side and making a "wall" out of his leg pads or "Gumpers," originated with Worsley.
- In the 2009 book 100 Ranger Greats, he was ranked No. 17 of the 901 New York Rangers who had played during the team's first 82 seasons

== Career statistics ==
=== Regular season and playoffs ===
Bold indicates led league

			Regular season									Playoffs
Season	Team	League	GP	W	L	T	MIN	GA	SO	GAA	SV%	GP	W	L	MIN	GA	SO	GAA	SV%
1946–47	Verdun Cyclones	QJHL	25	6	18	1	1500	138	3	5.52	—	—	—	—	—	—	—	—	—
1947–48	Verdun Cyclones	QJHL	29	13	11	5	1740	95	1	3.28	—	5	1	4	317	21	0	3.97	—
1948–49	Montreal St. Francis Xavier	MMJHL	47	24	21	2	2840	122	7	2.58	—	5	2	3	310	16	0	3.10	—
1948–49	New York Rovers	QSHL	2	—	—	—	120	5	0	2.50	—	—	—	—	—	—	—	—	—
1949–50	New York Rovers	EAHL	47	25	17	5	2830	133	7	2.86	—	12	8	2	720	27	1	2.25	—
1949–50	New Haven Ramblers	AHL	2	2	0	0	120	4	0	2.00	—	—	—	—	—	—	—	—	—
1950–51	St. Paul Saints	USHL	64	33	26	5	3920	184	3	2.82	—	4	1	3	257	9	0	2.19	—
1951–52	Saskatoon Quakers	PCHL	66	33	19	14	3960	206	5	3.07	—	13	10	3	818	31	1	2.27	—
1952–53	Saskatoon Quakers	WHL	13	5	7	1	780	50	0	3.84	—	—	—	—	—	—	—	—	—
1952–53	Edmonton Flyers	WHL	1	1	0	0	60	2	0	2.00	—	—	—	—	—	—	—	—	—
1952–53	New York Rangers	NHL	50	13	29	8	3000	153	2	3.06	.901	—	—	—	—	—	—	—	—
1953–54	Vancouver Canucks	WHL	70	39	24	7	4200	168	4	2.40	—	12	7	4	709	29	0	2.45	—
1954–55	New York Rangers	NHL	65	15	33	17	3900	197	4	3.03	.916	—	—	—	—	—	—	—	—
1955–56	New York Rangers	NHL	**70**	32	28	10	**4200**	**198**	4	2.83	.922	3	0	3	190	14	0	4.67	.861
1956–57	New York Rangers	NHL	68	26	28	14	4080	216	3	3.18	.906	5	1	4	316	21	0	3.99	.893
1957–58	New York Rangers	NHL	37	21	10	6	2200	86	4	2.32	**.929**	6	2	4	365	**28**	0	4.60	.872
1957–58	Providence Reds	AHL	25	12	11	2	1528	83	0	3.26	—	—	—	—	—	—	—	—	—
1958–59	New York Rangers	NHL	67	26	30	11	4001	198	2	2.97	.907	—	—	—	—	—	—	—	—
1959–60	New York Rangers	NHL	39	7	23	8	2301	135	0	3.52	.899	—	—	—	—	—	—	—	—
1959–60	Springfield Indians	AHL	15	11	3	1	900	33	3	2.20	—	—	—	—	—	—	—	—	—
1960–61	New York Rangers	NHL	59	20	29	8	3473	190	1	3.28	.912	—	—	—	—	—	—	—	—
1961–62	New York Rangers	NHL	60	22	27	9	3531	172	2	2.92	.912	6	2	4	384	21	0	3.28	.918
1962–63	New York Rangers	NHL	**67**	22	**34**	10	**3980**	**217**	2	3.27	.915	—	—	—	—	—	—	—	—
1963–64	Montreal Canadiens	NHL	8	3	2	2	444	22	1	2.97	.897	—	—	—	—	—	—	—	—
1963–64	Quebec Aces	AHL	47	30	16	1	2820	128	5	2.72	—	9	4	5	543	29	0	3.20	—
1964–65	Quebec Aces	AHL	37	24	12	1	2247	101	2	2.70	—	—	—	—	—	—	—	—	—
1964–65	Montreal Canadiens	NHL	19	10	7	1	1020	50	1	2.94	.906	8	5	3	501	14	**2**	**1.68**	**.936**
1965–66	Montreal Canadiens	NHL	51	29	14	6	2899	114	2	2.36	.920	10	**8**	2	602	20	**1**	**1.99**	**.931**
1966–67	Montreal Canadiens	NHL	18	9	6	2	888	47	1	3.18	.900	2	0	1	80	2	0	**1.50**	.956
1967–68	Montreal Canadiens	NHL	40	19	9	8	2213	73	6	**1.98**	.922	12	**11**	0	672	21	**1**	1.88	.930
1968–69	Montreal Canadiens	NHL	30	19	5	4	1703	64	5	2.25	.920	7	5	1	370	14	0	2.27	.921
1969–70	Montreal Canadiens	NHL	5	3	1	2	360	14	0	2.33	.915	—	—	—	—	—	—	—	—
1969–70	Minnesota North Stars	NHL	8	5	1	1	453	20	1	2.65	.932	3	1	2	180	14	0	4.67	.880
1970–71	Minnesota North Stars	NHL	24	4	10	8	1369	57	0	2.50	.920	4	3	1	240	13	0	3.25	.888
1971–72	Minnesota North Stars	NHL	34	16	10	7	1923	68	2	2.12	.934	4	2	1	194	7	1	2.16	.935
1972–73	Minnesota North Stars	NHL	12	6	2	3	624	30	0	2.88	.906	—	—	—	—	—	—	—	—
1973–74	Minnesota North Stars	NHL	29	8	14	5	1601	86	0	3.22	.901	—	—	—	—	—	—	—	—
NHL totals			861	335	352	150	50,183	2,407	43	2.88	.913	70	40	26	4,084	189	5	2.78	.912

"Gump Worsley's stats". The Goaltender Home Page.

Preceded by Bernie Geoffrion	Winner of the Calder Memorial Trophy; 1953	Succeeded by Camille Henry
Preceded by Johnny Bower and Terry Sawchuk	Winner of the Vezina Trophy with Charlie Hodge; 1966	Succeeded by Denis DeJordy and Glenn Hall
Preceded by Denis DeJordy and Glenn Hall	Winner of the Vezina Trophy with Rogatien Vachon; 1968	Succeeded by Glenn Hall and Jacques Plante
