= Bob McCord =

Canadian ice hockey player

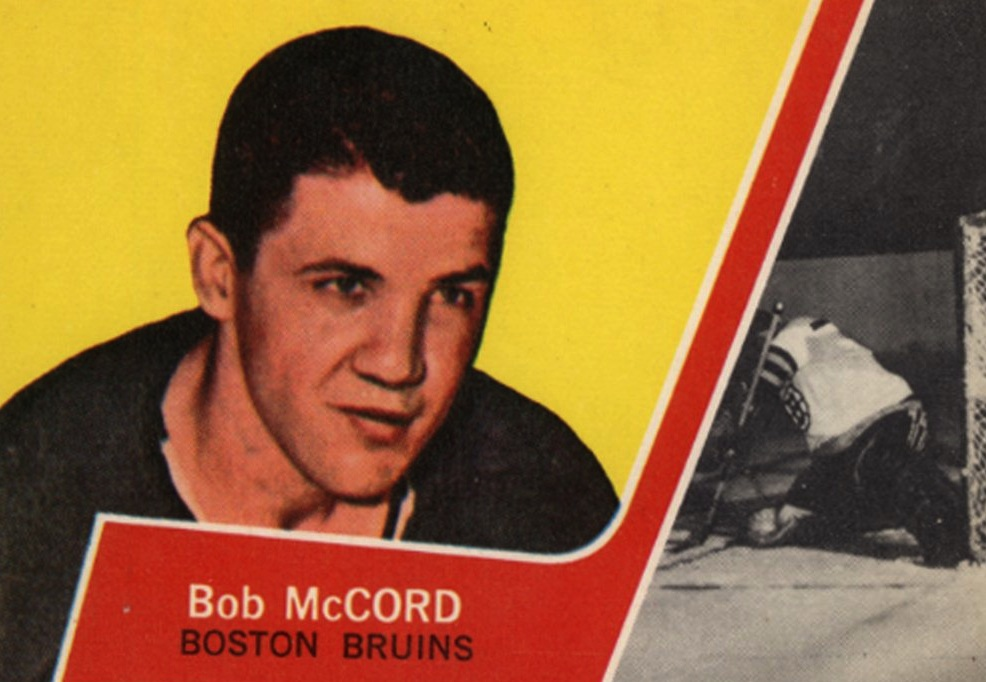
- Born: March 20, 1934 Matheson, Ontario, Canada
- Died: October 21, 2016 (aged 82) Parker, Colorado, U.S.
- Height: 6 ft 1 in (185 cm)
- Weight: 202 lb (92 kg; 14 st 6 lb)
- Position: Defence
- Shot: Right
- Played for: Boston Bruins; Minnesota North Stars; Detroit Red Wings
- Playing career: 1953–1975

Robert Lomer "Bob" McCord (March 20, 1934 – October 21, 2016) was a Canadian professional ice hockey player who played 316 games in the National Hockey League between 1963 and 1973. He played for the Minnesota North Stars, Detroit Red Wings, St. Louis Blues, and Boston Bruins. The rest of his career, which lasted from 1953 to 1975, was spent in various minor leagues, mainly the American Hockey League.

== Career statistics ==
=== Regular season and playoffs ===
			Regular season					Playoffs
Season	Team	League	GP	G	A	Pts	PIM	GP	G	A	Pts	PIM
1951–52	Porcupine Combines	NOJHA	—	—	—	—	—	—	—	—	—	—
1951–52	South Porcupine Combines	M-Cup	—	—	—	—	—	7	3	5	8	4
1952–53	Kitchener Greenshirts	OHA	23	3	7	10	14	—	—	—	—	—
1952–53	Montreal Junior Canadiens	QJHL	21	0	4	4	10	7	2	3	5	6
1953–54	Montreal Junior Canadiens	QJHL	49	11	20	31	84	8	5	4	9	20
1953–54	Montreal Royals	QSHL	3	0	0	0	2	—	—	—	—	—
1954–55	Springfield Indians	AHL	52	5	18	23	32	4	1	1	2	4
1955–56	Springfield Indians	AHL	57	6	21	27	45	—	—	—	—	—
1956–57	Springfield Indians	AHL	59	10	21	31	53	—	—	—	—	—
1957–58	Trois-Rivières Lions	QSHL	19	2	4	6	19	—	—	—	—	—
1957–58	Springfield Indians	AHL	41	0	5	5	38	—	—	—	—	—
1958–59	Springfield Indians	AHL	5	0	0	0	4	—	—	—	—	—
1958–59	Trois-Rivières Lions	QSHL	56	8	21	29	75	8	2	2	4	4
1959–60	Springfield Indians	AHL	70	11	28	39	114	9	0	2	2	8
1960–61	Springfield Indians	AHL	69	12	36	48	51	8	0	4	4	8
1961–62	Springfield Indians	AHL	66	8	29	37	62	11	0	5	5	16
1962–63	Springfield Indians	AHL	69	11	35	46	42	—	—	—	—	—
1963–64	Boston Bruins	NHL	65	1	9	10	49	—	—	—	—	—
1964–65	Boston Bruins	NHL	43	0	6	6	26	—	—	—	—	—
1964–65	Hershey Bears	AHL	24	3	7	10	16	15	1	6	7	44
1965–66	Detroit Red Wings	NHL	9	0	2	2	16	—	—	—	—	—
1965–66	Pittsburgh Hornets	AHL	62	7	26	33	54	3	0	0	0	7
1966–67	Detroit Red Wings	NHL	14	1	2	3	27	—	—	—	—	—
1966–67	Pittsburgh Hornets	AHL	61	8	26	34	40	9	2	4	6	2
1967–68	Detroit Red Wings	NHL	3	0	0	0	2	—	—	—	—	—
1967–68	Minnesota North Stars	NHL	70	3	9	12	39	14	2	5	7	10
1968–69	Minnesota North Stars	NHL	69	4	17	21	70	—	—	—	—	—
1969–70	Phoenix Roadrunners	WHL	63	11	23	34	41	—	—	—	—	—
1970–71	Denver Spurs	WHL	71	7	38	45	54	5	1	1	2	2
1971–72	Denver Spurs	WHL	69	4	29	33	33	9	3	3	6	6
1972–73	St. Louis Blues	NHL	43	1	13	14	33	—	—	—	—	—
1972–73	Denver Spurs	WHL	6	0	1	1	2	—	—	—	—	—
1973–74	Denver Spurs	WHL	32	6	12	18	8	—	—	—	—	—
1974–75	Denver Spurs	CHL	70	8	24	32	39	2	0	0	0	0
AHL totals			635	81	252	333	551	59	4	22	26	89
NHL totals			316	10	58	68	262	14	2	5	7	10
