= Jimmy Roberts =

American sportscaster

Jimmy Roberts (born 1957) is a sportscaster for NBC Sports. Roberts joined NBC in May 2000 after working as a sports reporter for nearly 12 years at ESPN and ABC Sports, winning several Emmy awards throughout his career.

== Early life and career ==
Roberts grew up in White Plains, New York. His father, Ralph, traded securities with the investment firm Moore & Schley in New York. His mother, Betty, taught first grade at the Ridgeway School in White Plains.

While attending White Plains High School, Roberts captained the varsity lacrosse team. He was also the school's morning announcer and occasionally wrote columns for his high-school newspaper, The Orange.

Roberts went on to study at the University of Maryland, College Park. During his time at Maryland, Roberts worked at the popular campus hangout R.J. Bentley's, where one of his Emmy Awards is now displayed. While still at college, he began work at ABC Sports as a production runner, supporting the outside broadcast team as they covered the lacrosse national championship for “Wide World of Sports.”

== ABC, ESPN and NBC Sports ==
Roberts' career has substantially been with NBC as a sports presenter. He began with the network briefly as a production assistant at the 1980 Lake Placid games. He covered the speed skating competition and, witnessing Eric Heiden's record five individual gold medals, came to regard it as history's greatest athletic achievement. Though he regards Dan Jansen's 1,000 metre win at the 1994 Winter Olympics as the most memorable sporting event he has televised.

His first roles as a sports TV writer and associate producer were with ABC, under Howard Cosell, on “SportsBeat,” a 30-minute investigative program. His work won him his first Emmy Award in 1984. He left the network to join ESPN. Having them sent an audition tape, he was hired by John Walsh who was running SportsCenter. The first sporting event he presented was the heavyweight championship bout between Mike Tyson and Michael Spinks in 1988. He became the cable channel's main presenter for boxing, and golf, for the next ten years.

In 1999, NBC approached Roberts as they needed a presenter for the upcoming 2000 Olympic Games in Sydney. In this time, he became known as an essayist with a sense of story, remembered for his Olympic reports on Eric the Eel and other idiosyncratic sports personalities.

He has remained with the network ever since, hosting golf coverage on NBC and its Golf Channel. Other NBC assignments over the years for Roberts include hosting the halftime show for Notre Dame football, being one of the main anchors for NBC's weekend sports updates, anchoring the network's coverage of the French Open, and worked as a field reporter for NBC's coverage of the 2000 American League Championship Series. He has also reported on horse racing for NBC. Roberts hosted and narrated the Outdoor Life Network's coverage of the 2005 Dakar Rally.

In presenting the 2024 Summer Olympics from Paris for NBC, Roberts had covered 20 Olympic Games over his broadcasting career. Roberts has been honoured with 15 Emmy Awards in this time, along with Lincoln Werden Award for golf writers, in 2023.

== Other work ==
In April 2009, Roberts published his first book, Breaking the Slump, which detailed the struggles of many famous golfers, including Jack Nicklaus, Arnold Palmer, George Herbert Walker Bush, and others and how they found their way through the inevitable challenges that plague anyone who plays the game. In 2022, Roberts co-authored “No One Wins Alone” with NHL hall of famer Mark Messier. The book was a memoir about Messier’s career which focused on leadership.

== Personal life ==
Roberts's father, Ralph, had been a US soldier, serving in the regiment which liberated the French town of Farébersviller. The story of the battle was narrated by Jimmy Roberts in a special feature for NBC, which he described as "the best thing I've done."

In 1994, Roberts married Sandra Mayer, a producer for Today and Nightline at NBC. The couple has lived in Rye in Westchester County, New York since then, raising three sons.

Roberts' sister-in-law, Debbie Mayer, worked in the south tower on the 56th floor at New York City's World Trade Center. Immediately after American Airlines Flight 11 (the first aircraft of the September 11, 2001, attacks) struck the north tower, Mayer began going downstairs to leave the building. She had gotten to the 29th floor when the second aircraft struck, hitting the building she worked in. However, Mayer escaped safely before the towers collapsed.

Roberts told of the ordeal to USA Today:

We had a couple of very anxious hours. My wife couldn't get through to Debbie. Finally, she went to her Manhattan apartment to wait for her. And she found her there. Turns out when the first explosion occurred in Building 1, Debbie started down the stairs. She had made it to the 29th floor when the building was shaken when the second plane hit. She was terrified but made it out.
