= Milan Marcetta =

Canadian ice hockey player

- Born: September 19, 1936; Cadomin, Alberta, Canada
- Died: September 18, 2014 (aged 77); Vernon, British Columbia, Canada
- Height: 6 ft 1 in (185 cm)
- Weight: 185 lb (84 kg; 13 st 3 lb)
- Position: Centre
- Shot: Left
- Played for: Toronto Maple Leafs; Minnesota North Stars
- Playing career: 1956–1973

Milan Marcetta (September 19, 1936 – September 18, 2014) was a Canadian professional ice hockey player who played 54 games in the National Hockey League with the Toronto Maple Leafs and Minnesota North Stars between 1967 and 1969. The rest of his career, which lasted from 1956 to 1973, was spent in the minor leagues. He only played three games in the finals in 1967 for Toronto, but earned the right to have his name engraved on the Stanley Cup. He died the day before his 78th birthday, on September 18, 2014.

== Career statistics ==
=== Regular season and playoffs ===
			Regular season					Playoffs
Season	Team	League	GP	G	A	Pts	PIM	GP	G	A	Pts	PIM
1953–54	Medicine Hat Tigers	WCJHL	13	5	3	8	2	10	2	3	5	0
1954–55	Medicine Hat Tigers	WCJHL	40	23	23	46	4	8	7	4	11	2
1955–56	Yorkton Terriers	SJHL	47	34	38	72	37	3	0	0	0	0
1956–57	Calgary Stampeders	WHL	67	27	22	49	20	1	0	0	0	0
1957–58	Buffalo Bisons	AHL	17	1	0	1	8	—	—	—	—	—
1957–58	Calgary Stampeders	WHL	41	11	6	17	14	14	4	0	4	2
1958–59	Springfield Indians	AHL	28	3	6	9	10	—	—	—	—	—
1958–59	Saskatoon Quakers	WHL	20	4	5	9	2	—	—	—	—	—
1959–60	Sault Thunderbirds	EPHL	70	28	55	83	19	—	—	—	—	—
1959–60	Buffalo Bisons	AHL	1	0	1	1	0	—	—	—	—	—
1960–61	Sault Thunderbirds	EPHL	50	8	18	26	59	6	0	0	0	)
1961–62	Sault Thunderbirds	EPHL	69	32	45	77	11	—	—	—	—	—
1962–63	St. Louis Braves	EPHL	20	9	4	13	27	—	—	—	—	—
1962–63	Calgary Stampeders	WHL	44	18	23	41	40	—	—	—	—	—
1963–64	Denver Invaders	WHL	58	23	23	46	19	6	5	1	6	12
1964–65	Victoria Maple Leafs	WHL	70	34	46	80	21	10	2	2	4	6
1965–66	Tulsa Oilers	CHL	8	8	7	15	2	—	—	—	—	—
1965–66	Victoria Maple Leafs	WHL	61	28	54	82	22	14	7	13	20	6
1966–67	Victoria Maple Leafs	WHL	70	40	35	75	2	—	—	—	—	—
1966–67	Toronto Maple Leafs	NHL	—	—	—	—	—	3	0	0	0	0
1967–68	Minnesota North Stars	NHL	36	4	13	17	6	14	7	7	14	4
1967–68	Rochester Americans	AHL	29	18	21	39	4	—	—	—	—	—
1968–69	Minnesota North Stars	NHL	18	3	2	5	4	—	—	—	—	—
1968–69	Memphis South Stars	CHL	22	6	9	15	22	—	—	—	—	—
1968–69	Phoenix Roadrunners	WHL	20	6	8	14	6	—	—	—	—	—
1969–70	Phoenix Roadrunners	WHL	73	34	32	66	14	—	—	—	—	—
1970–71	Phoenix Roadrunners	WHL	12	2	4	6	0	—	—	—	—	—
1970–71	Denver Spurs	WHL	30	6	17	23	2	5	2	6	8	0
1971–72	Denver Spurs	WHL	72	22	45	67	19	9	2	2	4	6
1972–73	Denver Spurs	WHL	52	18	22	40	14	5	2	2	4	2
WHL totals			690	273	342	615	195	64	24	26	50	34
NHL totals			54	7	15	22	10	17	7	7	14	4
