= 1967–68 Oakland Seals season =

NHL season

1967–68 California / Oakland Seals
- Division: 6th West
- 1967–68 record: 15–42–17
- Home record: 12–16–9
- Road record: 3–26–8
- Goals for: 153
- Goals against: 219

Team information
- General manager: Bert Olmstead (Oct–Mar); Frank Selke Jr.(Mar–Apr)
- Coach: Bert Olmstead
- Captain: Bobby Baun
- Alternate captains: Wally Boyer; Billy Harris
- Arena: Oakland Coliseum Arena
- Average attendance: 4,960

Team leaders
- Goals: Bill Hicke (21)
- Assists: Charlie Burns (26)
- Points: Gerry Ehman (44)
- Penalty minutes: Tracy Pratt (90)
- Plus/minus: Wally Boyer (0)
- Wins: Charlie Hodge (13)
- Goals against average: Charlie Hodge (2.86)

The 1967–68 Oakland Seals season was their first season in the National Hockey League (NHL). It began inauspiciously, with the firing of General Manager Rudy Pilous before the expansion draft. The Seals started their inaugural season with Hall of Famer Bert Olmstead as both coach and general manager, assisted by Gord Fashoway.

== Season overview ==
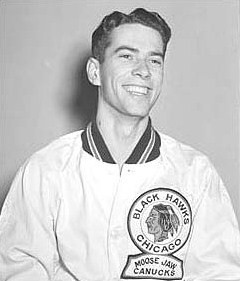
Bert Olmstead, the Seals' first coach and general manager

The team began the season as the California Seals in an attempt to cater to a larger audience, but this did not work; it was changed on December 8, 1967, and the team became known as the Oakland Seals. Despite winning the first two games of the season, the Seals won only 13 more en route to an NHL-worst record of 15–42–17. That gave the Seals 47 points, and they failed to qualify for the playoffs in their inaugural season in the NHL. Bert Olmstead served as the first coach and general manager of the team, though in early February 1968 he gave up coaching to his assistant coach, Gord Fashoway; in 43 games Olstead had a record of 10 wins, 32 losses, and 11 ties.

The team was not strong financially; late in the season the ownership group, led by Barry Van Gerbig began to look at selling. There were several interested groups, though two of them wanted to move the team to Canada, and as the NHL's new television contract called for a team in the San Francisco Bay area that was not possible. Attendance was low, with an average of 4,960 people per game, and the team lost an estimated $1.8 million over the season.

== Offseason ==
=== Expansion draft ===
#	Player	Drafted from
1.	Charlie Hodge (G)	Montreal Canadiens
2.	Gary Smith (G)	Toronto Maple Leafs
3.	Bob Baun (D)	Toronto Maple Leafs
4.	Kent Douglas (D)	Toronto Maple Leafs
5.	Bill Hicke (RW)	New York Rangers
6.	Billy Harris (W)	Detroit Red Wings
7.	Larry Cahan (D)	New York Rangers
8.	Wally Boyer (W)	Chicago Black Hawks
9.	Joe Szura (W)	Montreal Canadiens
10.	Bob Lemieux (D)	Montreal Canadiens
11.	J. P. Parise (LW)	Boston Bruins
12.	Ron Harris (D/W)	Boston Bruins
13.	Terry Clancy (W)	Toronto Maple Leafs
14.	Tracy Pratt (D)	Chicago Black Hawks
15.	Aut Erickson (D)	Toronto Maple Leafs
16.	Ron Boehm (W)	New York Rangers
17.	Alain Caron (W)	Chicago Black Hawks
18.	Mike Laughton (W)	Toronto Maple Leafs
19.	Bryan Hextall (W)	New York Rangers
20.	Gary Kilpatrick (D)	Chicago Black Hawks

=== Amateur draft ===
Round	Pick	Player	Nationality	College/junior/club team
1	3	Ken Hicks	Canada	Brandon Wheat Kings (MJHL)
2	12	Gary Wood	Canada	Fort Frances Royals (MJHL)
3	18	Kevin Smith	Canada	Halifax Colonels (MVJBHL)

== Regular season ==
On January 13, 1968, 4 minutes into a game against the Minnesota North Stars at the Met Center, Bill Masterton was checked by Larry Cahan and Ron Harris, and fell backwards onto the ice. The force of the back of his head hitting the ice caused significant internal bleeding. Masterton lost consciousness and never regained it: he died two days later.

=== Final standings ===
West Division
		GP	W	L	T	GF	GA	DIFF	Pts
1	Philadelphia Flyers	74	31	32	11	173	179	−6	73
2	Los Angeles Kings	74	31	33	10	200	224	−24	72
3	St. Louis Blues	74	27	31	16	177	191	−14	70
4	Minnesota North Stars	74	27	32	15	191	226	−35	69
5	Pittsburgh Penguins	74	27	34	13	195	216	−21	67
6	Oakland Seals	74	15	42	17	153	219	−66	47

=== Record vs. opponents ===
==== Vs. West Division ====
1967–68 NHL records
Team	LAK	MIN	OAK	PHI	PIT	STL	Total
Los Angeles	—	2–6–2	4–4–2	5–4–1	6–4	4–3–3	21–21–8
Minnesota	6–2–2	—	5–2–3	3–6–1	3–4–3	3–5–2	20–19–11
Oakland	4–4–2	2–5–3	—	4–3–3	1–5–4	0–7–3	11–24–15
Philadelphia	4–5–1	6–3–1	3–4–3	—	3–4–3	7–1–2	23–17–10
Pittsburgh	4–6	4–3–3	5–1–4	4–3–3	—	4–6	21–19–10
St. Louis	3–4–3	5–3–2	7–0–3	1–7–2	6–4	—	22–18–10

==== Vs. East Division ====
1967–68 NHL records
Team	BOS	CHI	DET	MTL	NYR	TOR	Total
Los Angeles	1–3	1–2–1	2–1–1	2–2	2–2	2–2	10–12–2
Minnesota	2–2	1–3	2–2	1–2–1	0–2–2	1–2–1	7–13–4
Oakland	2–2	0–3–1	0–3–1	1–3	0–4	1–3	4–18–2
Philadelphia	1–3	1–3	1–3	1–2–1	1–3	3–1	8–15–1
Pittsburgh	2–2	1–2–1	1–3	0–4	0–3–1	2–1–1	6–15–3
St. Louis	1–2–1	0–2–2	1–2–1	0–3–1	1–3	2–1–1	5–13–6

== Schedule and results ==
1967–68 regular season
October

Game	Result	Date	Score	Opponent	Record
1	W	October 11, 1967	5–1	Philadelphia Flyers (1967–68)	1–0–0
2	W	October 14, 1967	6–0	Minnesota North Stars (1967–68)	2–0–0
3	T	October 18, 1967	2–2	Los Angeles Kings (1967–68)	2–0–1
4	L	October 21, 1967	1–3	@ Minnesota North Stars (1967–68)	2–1–1
5	L	October 22, 1967	2–5	@ Philadelphia Flyers (1967–68)	2–2–1
6	L	October 25, 1967	1–4	@ Pittsburgh Penguins (1967–68)	2–3–1
7	L	October 26, 1967	2–8	@ Detroit Red Wings (1967–68)	2–4–1
8	L	October 28, 1967	2–5	@ Toronto Maple Leafs (1967–68)	2–5–1
9	T	October 29, 1967	2–2	@ Philadelphia Flyers (1967–68)	2–5–2

November

Game	Result	Date	Score	Opponent	Record
10	L	November 1, 1967	0–2	New York Rangers (1967–68)	2–6–2
11	L	November 4, 1967	0–1	Pittsburgh Penguins (1967–68)	2–7–2
12	T	November 5, 1967	2–2	Chicago Black Hawks (1967–68)	2–7–3
13	L	November 7, 1967	4–5	@ Los Angeles Kings (1967–68)	2–8–3
14	L	November 8, 1967	1–6	Toronto Maple Leafs (1967–68)	2–9–3
15	L	November 11, 1967	1–2	@ Boston Bruins (1967–68)	2–10–3
16	L	November 12, 1967	3–5	@ New York Rangers (1967–68)	2–11–3
17	W	November 15, 1967	4–1	Los Angeles Kings (1967–68)	3–11–3
18	T	November 16, 1967	1–1	Detroit Red Wings (1967–68)	3–11–4
19	W	November 18, 1967	2–1	Montreal Canadiens (1967–68)	4–11–4
20	L	November 22, 1967	1–3	@ Los Angeles Kings (1967–68)	4–12–4
21	T	November 25, 1967	2–2	Pittsburgh Penguins (1967–68)	4–12–5
22	L	November 29, 1967	1–6	@ Pittsburgh Penguins (1967–68)	4–13–5
23	W	November 30, 1967	3–1	@ Philadelphia Flyers (1967–68)	5–13–5

December

Game	Result	Date	Score	Opponent	Record
24	L	December 2, 1967	0–3	@ Toronto Maple Leafs (1967–68)	5–14–5
25	W	December 6, 1967	4–2	Philadelphia Flyers (1967–68)	6–14–5
26	L	December 9, 1967	0–1	St. Louis Blues (1967–68)	6–15–5
27	L	December 13, 1967	1–3	@ St. Louis Blues (1967–68)	6–16–5
28	W	December 15, 1967	4–1	Boston Bruins (1967–68)	7–16–5
29	L	December 16, 1967	0–1	Minnesota North Stars (1967–68)	7–17–5
30	L	December 19, 1967	1–3	@ Los Angeles Kings (1967–68)	7–18–5
31	L	December 20, 1967	1–2	St. Louis Blues (1967–68)	7–19–5
32	L	December 23, 1967	2–4	@ Montreal Canadiens (1967–68)	7–20–5
33	L	December 25, 1967	3–6	@ Boston Bruins (1967–68)	7–21–5
34	T	December 27, 1967	0–0	@ Pittsburgh Penguins (1967–68)	7–21–6
35	L	December 30, 1967	0–2	@ Montreal Canadiens (1967–68)	7–22–6
36	L	December 31, 1967	0–3	@ Chicago Black Hawks (1967–68)	7–23–6

January

Game	Result	Date	Score	Opponent	Record
37	L	January 3, 1968	0–4	@ St. Louis Blues (1967–68)	7–24–6
38	L	January 4, 1968	3–9	@ Detroit Red Wings (1967–68)	7–25–6
39	T	January 6, 1968	5–5	Minnesota North Stars (1967–68)	7–25–7
40	W	January 7, 1968	6–0	Los Angeles Kings (1967–68)	8–25–7
41	T	January 10, 1968	2–2	St. Louis Blues (1967–68)	8–25–8
42	T	January 13, 1968	2–2	@ Minnesota North Stars (1967–68)	8–25–9
43	L	January 14, 1968	3–6	Philadelphia Flyers (1967–68)	8–26–9
44	T	January 17, 1968	1–1	Pittsburgh Penguins (1967–68)	8–26–10
45	L	January 20, 1968	0–3	New York Rangers (1967–68)	8–27–10
46	W	January 21, 1968	3–0	Los Angeles Kings (1967–68)	9–27–10
47	W	January 24, 1968	4–1	@ Los Angeles Kings (1967–68)	10–27–10
48	L	January 27, 1968	1–3	@ Minnesota North Stars (1967–68)	10–28–10
49	L	January 28, 1968	2–4	@ New York Rangers (1967–68)	10–29–10

February

Game	Result	Date	Score	Opponent	Record
50	T	February 1, 1968	3–3	@ Philadelphia Flyers (1967–68)	10–29–11
51	L	February 3, 1968	1–4	@ St. Louis Blues (1967–68)	10–30–11
52	L	February 4, 1968	3–4	@ Minnesota North Stars (1967–68)	10–31–11
53	L	February 7, 1968	1–4	Pittsburgh Penguins (1967–68)	10–32–11
54	L	February 10, 1968	2–5	Minnesota North Stars (1967–68)	10–33–11
55	W	February 11, 1968	4–3	Toronto Maple Leafs (1967–68)	11–33–11
56	W	February 14, 1968	4–0	Philadelphia Flyers (1967–68)	12–33–11
57	W	February 17, 1968	3–1	Boston Bruins (1967–68)	13–33–11
58	L	February 21, 1968	0–1	Chicago Black Hawks (1967–68)	13–34–11
59	W	February 24, 1968	3–1	@ Pittsburgh Penguins (1967–68)	14–34–11
60	T	February 25, 1968	3–3	@ Minnesota North Stars (1967–68)	14–34–12
61	W	February 28, 1968	6–3	Minnesota North Stars (1967–68)	15–34–12

March

Game	Result	Date	Score	Opponent	Record
62	T	March 2, 1968	6–6	@ Pittsburgh Penguins (1967–68)	15–34–13
63	T	March 3, 1968	1–1	@ Philadelphia Flyers (1967–68)	15–34–14
64	L	March 6, 1968	0–2	Montreal Canadiens (1967–68)	15–35–14
65	L	March 7, 1968	2–9	@ Los Angeles Kings (1967–68)	15–36–14
66	L	March 9, 1968	1–3	@ St. Louis Blues (1967–68)	15–37–14
67	L	March 10, 1968	0–1	St. Louis Blues (1967–68)	15–38–14
68	L	March 13, 1968	2–4	Detroit Red Wings (1967–68)	15–39–14
69	T	March 15, 1968	1–1	@ St. Louis Blues (1967–68)	15–39–15
70	L	March 17, 1968	1–4	@ Chicago Black Hawks (1967–68)	15–40–15
71	L	March 20, 1968	1–5	Philadelphia Flyers (1967–68)	15–41–15
72	T	March 23, 1968	3–3	St. Louis Blues (1967–68)	15–41–16
73	L	March 27, 1968	4–7	Pittsburgh Penguins (1967–68)	15–42–16
74	T	March 30, 1968	2–2	Los Angeles Kings (1967–68)	15–42–17

Legend: Win (2 points) Loss (0 points) Tie (1 point)

== Player statistics ==
=== Skaters ===
Note: GP = Games played; G = Goals; A = Assists; Pts = Points; PIM = Penalties in minutes

		Regular season					Playoffs
Player	#	GP	G	A	Pts	PIM	GP	G	A	Pts	PIM
Gerry Ehman	8	73	19	25	44	20	–	–	–	–	–
Bill Hicke	9	52	21	19	40	32	–	–	–	–	–
Charlie Burns	20	73	9	26	35	20	–	–	–	–	–
Wally Boyer	6	74	13	20	33	44	–	–	–	–	–
Billy Harris	7	62	12	17	29	2	–	–	–	–	–
Ted Hampson^{†}	10	34	8	19	27	4	–	–	–	–	–
Larry Cahan	5	74	9	15	24	80	–	–	–	–	–
Alain Caron	12	58	9	13	22	18	–	–	–	–	–
Larry Popein^{†}	17	47	5	14	19	12	–	–	–	–	–
George Swarbrick	14	49	13	5	18	62	–	–	–	–	–
John Brenneman^{†}	16	31	10	8	18	14	–	–	–	–	–
Kent Douglas^{‡}	19	40	4	11	15	80	–	–	–	–	–
Aut Erickson	4	65	4	11	15	46	–	–	–	–	–
Bob Baun	21	67	3	10	13	81	–	–	–	–	–
Gerry Odrowski	10	42	4	6	10	10	–	–	–	–	–
Ron Harris	15	54	4	6	10	60	–	–	–	–	–
Mike Laughton	22	35	2	6	8	38	–	–	–	–	–
Tracy Pratt	2	34	0	5	5	90	–	–	–	–	–
Joe Szura	18	20	1	3	4	10	–	–	–	–	–
Bert Marshall^{†}	19	20	0	4	4	18	–	–	–	–	–
Ron Boehm	11	16	2	1	3	10	–	–	–	–	–
Tom Thurlby	3	20	1	2	3	4	–	–	–	–	–
Bob Lemieux	2	19	0	1	1	12	–	–	–	–	–
Gary Smith	30	21	0	1	1	4	–	–	–	–	–
Jean Cusson	22	2	0	0	0	0	–	–	–	–	–
Terry Clancy	17	7	0	0	0	2	–	–	–	–	–
Charlie Hodge	1	58	0	0	0	4	–	–	–	–	–

^{†}Denotes player spent time with another team before joining Seals. Stats reflect time with the Seals only. ^{‡}Traded mid-season

=== Goaltenders ===
Note: GP = Games played; TOI = Time on ice (minutes); W = Wins; L= Losses; T = Ties; GA = Goals against; SO = Shutouts; GAA = Goals against average

		Regular season								Playoffs
Player	#	GP	TOI	W	L	T	GA	SO	GAA	GP	TOI	W	L	GA	SO	GAA
Charlie Hodge	1	58	3311	13	29	3	158	3	2.86	–	–	–	–	–	–	–
Gary Smith	30	21	1129	2	13	4	60	1	3.19	–	–	–	–	–	–	–

== Transactions ==
The Seals were involved in the following transactions during the 1967–68 season:

=== Trades ===
October 3, 1967	To California Seals Gerry Ehman	To Toronto Maple Leafs Bryan Hextall Jr. J. P. Parise
December, 1967	To Oakland Seals Larry Popein	To New York Rangers cash
January 9, 1968	To Oakland Seals John Brenneman; Ted Hampson; Bert Marshall	To Detroit Red Wings Kent Douglas
