= 1967–68 St. Louis Blues season =

National Hockey League team season

1967–68 St. Louis Blues
- Division: 3rd West
- 1967–68 record: 27–31–16
- Home record: 18–12–7
- Road record: 9–19–9
- Goals for: 177
- Goals against: 198

Team information
- General manager: Lynn Patrick
- Coach: Lynn Patrick; Scotty Bowman
- Captain: Al Arbour
- Alternate captains: Jim Roberts; Noel Picard; Red Berenson
- Arena: St. Louis Arena

Team leaders
- Goals: Red Berenson (22)
- Assists: Gerry Melnyk (35)
- Points: Red Berenson (51)
- Penalty minutes: Barclay Plager (153)
- Wins: Glenn Hall (19)
- Goals against average: Glenn Hall (2.48)

The 1967–68 St. Louis Blues season was the inaugural season in the history of the franchise. The Blues were one of the six new teams added to the NHL in the 1967 expansion. The other franchises were the Minnesota North Stars, Los Angeles Kings, Philadelphia Flyers, Pittsburgh Penguins, and California Seals (later rebranded to the Oakland Seals during the season before the Blues had a chance to play the Seals while they used their California name). The league doubled in size from its Original Six.

St. Louis was the last of the expansion teams to officially get into the league. The Blues were chosen over Baltimore at the insistence of the Chicago Black Hawks. The Black Hawks were owned at that time by the Wirtz family, who also owned the St. Louis Arena. The team's first owners were insurance tycoon Sid Salomon Jr., his son, Sid Salomon III, and Robert L. Wolfson. Sid Salomon III convinced his initially wary father to make a bid for the team. Salomon then spent several million dollars on renovations for the 38-year-old Arena, which increased the number of seats from 12,000 to 15,000 and provided its first significant maintenance since the 1940s.

Because the playoff format required an expansion team to make it to the Stanley Cup finals, the Blues became the first expansion team to reach that mark. However, they were the last of the still operating 1967 expansion teams to win the cup, which they did in 2019.

== Offseason ==
=== NHL draft ===
The Blues attempted to select Saskatoon Blades forward Dale Fairbrother with their first round pick, but the pick was ruled invalid since Fairbrother was on the Portland Buckaroos' sponsored list. The Blues passed on making selections in the second and third rounds.

== Regular season ==
Original logo of the St. Louis Blues

The franchise's first game was played on October 11, 1967. The Blues and Minnesota North Stars played to a 2–2 tie at the St. Louis Arena, with the Blues' first ever team goal scored by Larry Keenan of North Bay, Ontario. A St. Michaels product, Keenan had his career end prematurely due to injuries. He relocated back to North Bay where he coached a local Midget AAA team for many years.

The Blues were originally coached by Lynn Patrick who resigned in late-November and was replaced by Scotty Bowman. Although the league's rules effectively kept star players with the Original Six teams, the Blues were one of the stronger teams of the West Division. The playoff format required an expansion team to make it to the Stanley Cup finals, and the Blues made it to the final round.

=== Season standings ===
West Division
		GP	W	L	T	GF	GA	DIFF	Pts
1	Philadelphia Flyers	74	31	32	11	173	179	−6	73
2	Los Angeles Kings	74	31	33	10	200	224	−24	72
3	St. Louis Blues	74	27	31	16	177	191	−14	70
4	Minnesota North Stars	74	27	32	15	191	226	−35	69
5	Pittsburgh Penguins	74	27	34	13	195	216	−21	67
6	Oakland Seals	74	15	42	17	153	219	−66	47

=== Record vs. opponents ===
==== Vs. West Division ====
1967–68 NHL records
Team	LAK	MIN	OAK	PHI	PIT	STL	Total
Los Angeles	—	2–6–2	4–4–2	5–4–1	6–4	4–3–3	21–21–8
Minnesota	6–2–2	—	5–2–3	3–6–1	3–4–3	3–5–2	20–19–11
Oakland	4–4–2	2–5–3	—	4–3–3	1–5–4	0–7–3	11–24–15
Philadelphia	4–5–1	6–3–1	3–4–3	—	3–4–3	7–1–2	23–17–10
Pittsburgh	4–6	4–3–3	5–1–4	4–3–3	—	4–6	21–19–10
St. Louis	3–4–3	5–3–2	7–0–3	1–7–2	6–4	—	22–18–10

==== Vs. East Division ====
1967–68 NHL records
Team	BOS	CHI	DET	MTL	NYR	TOR	Total
Los Angeles	1–3	1–2–1	2–1–1	2–2	2–2	2–2	10–12–2
Minnesota	2–2	1–3	2–2	1–2–1	0–2–2	1–2–1	7–13–4
Oakland	2–2	0–3–1	0–3–1	1–3	0–4	1–3	4–18–2
Philadelphia	1–3	1–3	1–3	1–2–1	1–3	3–1	8–15–1
Pittsburgh	2–2	1–2–1	1–3	0–4	0–3–1	2–1–1	6–15–3
St. Louis	1–2–1	0–2–2	1–2–1	0–3–1	1–3	2–1–1	5–13–6

== Playoffs ==
=== Stanley Cup Final ===
The Blues beat the North Stars in a game 7 double overtime and made the Stanley Cup Final. Although they lost in four straight games, they played proudly, as all four games each were decided by just one goal (and two of the four were decided in overtime). Glenn Hall was especially noted for his goaltending, especially in game three when the Blues were outshot 46 to 15. Red Burnett, one of the most prominent hockey writers of the day, said of Hall's playing, "A number of Hall's saves were seemingly impossible. Experts walked out of the Forum convinced no other goaltender had performed so brilliantly in a losing cause." In overtime in game three, Hall made an exceptional save on Dick Duff and then, standing on his head, made another. Burnett said, "It was a heartbreaker to see. After the saves on Duff, Bobby Rousseau came and batted home the second rebound." Hall's playing won him the Conn Smythe Trophy as the most valuable player in the playoffs.

However, Montreal was not to be denied and won the Stanley Cup in game four as J. C. Tremblay fired home the winning goal. When the game ended, the fans came on the ice to celebrate, and balloons, hats and programs were thrown from the stands.

== Schedule and results ==
1967–68 regular season
October

Game	Result	Date	Score	Opponent	Record
1	T	October 11, 1967	2–2	Minnesota North Stars (1967–68)	0–0–1
2	L	October 13, 1967	1–3	Pittsburgh Penguins (1967–68)	0–1–1
3	W	October 14, 1967	4–2	@ Pittsburgh Penguins (1967–68)	1–1–1
4	L	October 18, 1967	1–2	Philadelphia Flyers (1967–68)	1–2–1
5	T	October 21, 1967	3–3	Los Angeles Kings (1967–68)	1–2–2
6	L	October 22, 1967	0–1	@ Detroit Red Wings (1967–68)	1–3–2
7	L	October 25, 1967	2–3	@ Minnesota North Stars (1967–68)	1–4–2
8	L	October 28, 1967	1–4	@ Montreal Canadiens (1967–68)	1–5–2

November

Game	Result	Date	Score	Opponent	Record
9	W	November 1, 1967	5–1	Boston Bruins (1967–68)	2–5–2
10	W	November 4, 1967	3–2	Detroit Red Wings (1967–68)	3–5–2
11	L	November 8, 1967	1–5	@ Minnesota North Stars (1967–68)	3–6–2
12	W	November 11, 1967	5–1	@ Pittsburgh Penguins (1967–68)	4–6–2
13	L	November 12, 1967	2–5	@ Chicago Black Hawks (1967–68)	4–7–2
14	L	November 15, 1967	1–4	Chicago Black Hawks (1967–68)	4–8–2
15	L	November 18, 1967	3–5	Pittsburgh Penguins (1967–68)	4–9–2
16	L	November 19, 1967	2–3	@ Philadelphia Flyers (1967–68)	4–10–2
17	L	November 22, 1967	1–3	Montreal Canadiens (1967–68)	4–11–2
18	L	November 25, 1967	1–2	Philadelphia Flyers (1967–68)	4–12–2
19	L	November 26, 1967	0–1	@ New York Rangers (1967–68)	4–13–2
20	W	November 29, 1967	3–2	Los Angeles Kings (1967–68)	5–13–2

December

Game	Result	Date	Score	Opponent	Record
21	L	December 2, 1967	1–5	Minnesota North Stars (1967–68)	5–14–2
22	L	December 3, 1967	2–4	@ Philadelphia Flyers (1967–68)	5–15–2
23	L	December 6, 1967	2–3	@ Los Angeles Kings (1967–68)	5–16–2
24	W	December 9, 1967	1–0	@ Oakland Seals (1967–68)	6–16–2
25	W	December 10, 1967	2–1	Toronto Maple Leafs (1967–68)	7–16–2
26	W	December 13, 1967	3–1	Oakland Seals (1967–68)	8–16–2
27	T	December 14, 1967	2–2	@ Philadelphia Flyers (1967–68)	8–16–3
28	L	December 16, 1967	0–1	Philadelphia Flyers (1967–68)	8–17–3
29	L	December 17, 1967	3–5	@ New York Rangers (1967–68)	8–18–3
30	W	December 20, 1967	2–1	@ Oakland Seals (1967–68)	9–18–3
31	L	December 23, 1967	0–4	@ Los Angeles Kings (1967–68)	9–19–3
32	W	December 25, 1967	1–0	@ Minnesota North Stars (1967–68)	10–19–3
33	W	December 27, 1967	4–2	Los Angeles Kings (1967–68)	11–19–3
34	W	December 29, 1967	2–1	Pittsburgh Penguins (1967–68)	12–19–3
35	L	December 30, 1967	1–8	@ Toronto Maple Leafs (1967–68)	12–20–3

January

Game	Result	Date	Score	Opponent	Record
36	W	January 3, 1968	4–0	Oakland Seals (1967–68)	13–20–3
37	W	January 6, 1968	2–1	Los Angeles Kings (1967–68)	14–20–3
38	T	January 10, 1968	2–2	@ Oakland Seals (1967–68)	14–20–4
39	T	January 11, 1968	2–2	@ Los Angeles Kings (1967–68)	14–20–5
40	L	January 13, 1968	1–3	New York Rangers (1967–68)	14–21–5
41	T	January 14, 1968	2–2	@ Chicago Black Hawks (1967–68)	14–21–6
42	W	January 17, 1968	5–0	Minnesota North Stars (1967–68)	15–21–6
43	T	January 21, 1968	2–2	@ Philadelphia Flyers (1967–68)	15–21–7
44	W	January 24, 1968	5–2	Minnesota North Stars (1967–68)	16–21–7
45	T	January 25, 1968	4–4	@ Detroit Red Wings (1967–68)	16–21–8
46	W	January 27, 1968	4–3	New York Rangers (1967–68)	17–21–8
47	W	January 31, 1968	9–4	Pittsburgh Penguins (1967–68)	18–21–8

February

Game	Result	Date	Score	Opponent	Record
48	L	February 1, 1968	0–2	@ Pittsburgh Penguins (1967–68)	18–22–8
49	W	February 3, 1968	4–1	Oakland Seals (1967–68)	19–22–8
50	L	February 7, 1968	4–6	Boston Bruins (1967–68)	19–23–8
51	L	February 10, 1968	1–2	Philadelphia Flyers (1967–68)	19–24–8
52	T	February 11, 1968	3–3	@ Boston Bruins (1967–68)	19–24–9
53	T	February 14, 1968	2–2	Los Angeles Kings (1967–68)	19–24–10
54	W	February 16, 1968	3–1	@ Pittsburgh Penguins (1967–68)	20–24–10
55	T	February 17, 1968	2–2	@ Minnesota North Stars (1967–68)	20–24–11
56	W	February 21, 1968	5–1	@ Toronto Maple Leafs (1967–68)	21–24–11
57	L	February 22, 1968	1–2	@ Montreal Canadiens (1967–68)	21–25–11
58	L	February 25, 1968	2–4	@ Los Angeles Kings (1967–68)	21–26–11
59	T	February 28, 1968	3–3	Montreal Canadiens (1967–68)	21–26–12

March

Game	Result	Date	Score	Opponent	Record
60	T	March 2, 1968	3–3	Chicago Black Hawks (1967–68)	21–26–13
61	L	March 3, 1968	3–9	@ Boston Bruins (1967–68)	21–27–13
62	W	March 6, 1968	4–2	Pittsburgh Penguins (1967–68)	22–27–13
63	W	March 9, 1968	3–1	Oakland Seals (1967–68)	23–27–13
64	W	March 10, 1968	1–0	@ Oakland Seals (1967–68)	24–27–13
65	T	March 13, 1968	3–3	Toronto Maple Leafs (1967–68)	24–27–14
66	T	March 15, 1968	1–1	Oakland Seals (1967–68)	24–27–15
67	L	March 16, 1968	3–6	Detroit Red Wings (1967–68)	24–28–15
68	L	March 20, 1968	2–4	@ Pittsburgh Penguins (1967–68)	24–29–15
69	L	March 22, 1968	1–6	@ Los Angeles Kings (1967–68)	24–30–15
70	T	March 23, 1968	3–3	@ Oakland Seals (1967–68)	24–30–16
71	W	March 27, 1968	3–0	Philadelphia Flyers (1967–68)	25–30–16
72	L	March 28, 1968	0–2	@ Philadelphia Flyers (1967–68)	25–31–16
73	W	March 30, 1968	3–2	Minnesota North Stars (1967–68)	26–31–16
74	W	March 31, 1968	5–3	@ Minnesota North Stars (1967–68)	27–31–16

Legend: Win (2 points) Loss (0 points) Tie (1 point)

== Playoffs ==
1968 Stanley Cup playoffs
Quarterfinals vs. (W1) Philadelphia Flyers – Blues win 4–3

Game	Result	Date	Score	Opponent	Record
1	W	April 4, 1968	1–0	@ Philadelphia Flyers	Blues lead 1–0
2	L	April 6, 1968	3–4	@ Philadelphia Flyers	Series tied 1–1
3	W	April 10, 1968	3–2 2OT	Philadelphia Flyers	Blues lead 2–1
4	W	April 11, 1968	5–2	Philadelphia Flyers	Blues lead 3–1
5	L	April 13, 1968	1–6	@ Philadelphia Flyers	Blues lead 3–2
6	L	April 16, 1968	1–2 2OT	Philadelphia Flyers	Series tied 3–2
7	W	April 18, 1968	3–1	@ Philadelphia Flyers	Blues win 4–3

Semifinals vs. (W4) Minnesota North Stars – Blues win 4–3

Game	Result	Date	Score	Opponent	Record
1	W	April 21, 1968	5–3	Minnesota North Stars	Blues lead 1–0
2	L	April 22, 1968	2–3 OT	@ Minnesota North Stars	Series tied 1–1
3	L	April 25, 1968	1–5	Minnesota North Stars	North Stars lead 2–1
4	W	April 27, 1968	4–3 OT	Minnesota North Stars	Series tied 2–2
5	W	April 29, 1968	3–2 OT	Minnesota North Stars	Blues lead 3–2
6	L	May 1, 1968	1–5	@ Minnesota North Stars	Series tied 3–3
7	W	May 3, 1968	2–1 2OT	Minnesota North Stars	Blues win 4–3

Stanley Cup Finals vs. (E1) Montreal Canadiens – Canadiens win 4–0

Game	Result	Date	Score	Opponent	Record
1	L	May 5, 1968	2–3	Montreal Canadiens	Canadiens lead 1–0
2	L	May 7, 1968	0–1	Montreal Canadiens	Canadiens lead 2–0
3	L	May 9, 1968	3–4 OT	@ Montreal Canadiens	Canadiens lead 3–0
4	L	May 11, 1968	2–3	@ Montreal Canadiens	Canadiens win 4–0

Legend: Win Loss

== Player statistics ==
=== Forwards ===
Note: GP= Games played; G= Goals; AST= Assists; PTS = Points; PIM = Points

Player	GP	G	AST	PTS	PIM
Gordon "Red" Berenson	55	22	29	51	22
Gerry Melnyk	73	15	35	50	14
Frank St. Marseille	57	16	16	32	12
Don McKenney	39	9	20	29	4
Terry Crisp	73	9	20	29	10
Bill McCreary	70	13	13	26	22
Gary Sabourin	50	13	10	23	50
Larry Keenan	40	12	8	20	4
Ron Schock	55	9	9	18	17
Tim Ecclestone	50	6	8	14	16
Ron Stewart	19	7	5	12	11
Craig Cameron	32	7	2	9	8
Dickie Moore	27	5	3	8	9
Wayne Rivers	22	4	4	8	8
Ron Attwell	18	1	7	8	6
Roger Picard	15	2	2	4	21
Gary Veneruzzo	5	1	1	2	0
Norm Beaudin	13	1	1	2	4
Claude Cardin	1	0	0	0	0

=== Defensemen ===
Note: GP= Games played; G= Goals; AST= Assists; PTS = Points; PIM = Points

Player	GP	G	AST	PTS	PIM
Jim Roberts	74	14	23	37	66
Barclay Plager	49	5	15	20	153
Fred Hucul	43	2	13	15	30
Noel Picard	66	1	10	11	142
Al Arbour	74	1	10	11	50
Bob Plager	53	2	5	7	86
Jean-Guy Talbot	23	0	4	4	2
Ray Fortin	24	0	2	2	8
Gordon Kannegiesser	19	0	1	1	13
Darryl Edestrand	12	0	0	0	2

=== Goaltending ===
Note: GP= Games played; MIN= Minutes; W= Wins; L= Losses; T = Ties; SO = Shutouts; GAA = Goals against

Player	GP	MIN	W	L	T	SO	GAA
Glenn Hall	49	2858	19	21	9	5	2.48
Seth Martin	30	1552	8	10	7	1	2.59
Don Caley	1	30	0	0	0	0	6.00

== Post-season stats ==
=== Forwards ===
Note: GP= Games played; G= Goals; AST= Assists; PTS = Points; PIM = Points

Player	GP	G	AST	PTS	PIM
Gordon "Red" Berenson	18	5	2	7	9
Gerry Melnyk	17	2	6	8	2
Frank St. Marseille	18	5	8	13	0
Don McKenney	6	1	1	2	2
Terry Crisp	18	1	5	6	6
Bill McCreary	15	3	2	5	0
Gary Sabourin	18	4	2	6	30
Larry Keenan	18	4	5	9	4
Ron Schock	12	1	2	3	0
Tim Ecclestone	12	1	2	3	2
Craig Cameron	14	1	0	1	11
Dickie Moore	18	7	7	14	15
Gary Veneruzzo	9	0	2	2	2

=== Defensemen ===
Note: GP= Games played; G= Goals; AST= Assists; PTS = Points; PIM = Points

Player	GP	G	AST	PTS	PIM
Jim Roberts	18	4	1	5	20
Barclay Plager	18	2	5	7	73
Noel Picard	13	0	3	3	46
Al Arbour	14	0	3	3	10
Bob Plager	18	1	2	3	69
Jean-Guy Talbot	17	0	2	2	8
Ray Fortin	3	0	0	0	2
Doug Harvey	8	0	4	4	12

=== Goaltending ===
Note: GP= Games played; MIN= Minutes; W= Wins; L= Losses; T = Ties; SO = Shutouts; GAA = Goals against; SV% = Save percentage

Player	GP	MIN	W	L	T	SO	GAA	SV%
Glenn Hall	18	535	8	10	–	1	2.44	.916

== Awards and honors ==
- Glenn Hall, Conn Smythe Trophy

== Expansion draft ==
- St. Louis Blues selections

#	Player	Drafted from
1.	Glenn Hall (G)	Chicago Black Hawks
2.	Don Caley (G)	Detroit Red Wings
3.	Jim Roberts (D/W)	Montreal Canadiens
4.	Noel Picard (D)	Montreal Canadiens
5.	Al Arbour (D)	Toronto Maple Leafs
6.	Rod Seiling (D)	New York Rangers
7.	Ron Schock (C)	Boston Bruins
8.	Terry Crisp (C)	Boston Bruins
9.	Don McKenney (C)	Detroit Red Wings
10.	Wayne Rivers (RW)	Boston Bruins
11.	Billy Hay (C)	Chicago Black Hawks
12.	Darryl Edestrand (D)	Toronto Maple Leafs
13.	Norm Beaudin (RW)	Detroit Red Wings
14.	Larry Keenan (LW)	Toronto Maple Leafs
15.	Ron Stewart (C)	Boston Bruins
16.	Fred Hucul (D)	Toronto Maple Leafs
17.	John Brenneman (LW)	Toronto Maple Leafs
18.	Gerry Melnyk (C)	Chicago Black Hawks
19.	Gary Veneruzzo (LW)	Toronto Maple Leafs
20.	Max Mestinsek (RW)	New York Rangers
