= 1967–68 Pittsburgh Penguins season =

NHL team season inaugural

1967–68 Pittsburgh Penguins
- Division: 5th West
- 1967–68 record: 27–34–13
- Home record: 15–12–10
- Road record: 12–22–3
- Goals for: 195
- Goals against: 216

Team information
- General manager: Jack Riley
- Coach: Red Sullivan
- Captain: Ab McDonald
- Alternate captains: Leo Boivin; Earl Ingarfield; Al MacNeil
- Arena: Pittsburgh Civic Arena
- Average attendance: 7,405 (59.2%) (36 games)

Team leaders
- Goals: Ab McDonald (22)
- Assists: Andy Bathgate (39)
- Points: Andy Bathgate (59)
- Penalty minutes: Leo Boivin (74)
- Wins: Les Binkley (20)
- Goals against average: Hank Bassen (2.86)

The 1967–68 Pittsburgh Penguins season was their first in the NHL. Pittsburgh was one of six cities awarded an expansion team during the 1967 NHL expansion.

After deciding on the "Penguin" nickname (which was inspired by the fact that the team was going to play in an "Igloo", the nickname of the Pittsburgh Civic Center), a logo was chosen, that had a penguin in front of a triangle, which is thought to be in tribute to the "Golden Triangle".

== Offseason ==
On February 8, 1966, the NHL awarded a franchise to the Hockey Club of Pittsburgh, Incorporated: a partnership of several investors headed by Pennsylvania State Senator Jack McGregor and his friend and business associate Peter Block. McGregor became the public face of the ownership, as president and chief executive officer, and representing the club at Board of Governors meetings.

Later that year McGregor and Block began assembling their new hockey team. American Hockey League executive Jack Riley was named the club's general manager, and began immediately acquiring the services of players. He signed minor-leaguers Les Binkley, Ted Lanyon, Dick Mattiussi and Bill Speer to contracts before the club had ever taken to the ice.

The name of the new team was chosen by a contest in a local newspaper: on February 10, 1967, the new team became known as the Penguins.

In the 1967 NHL expansion draft Riley chose experienced players, particularly former New York Rangers players. Coincidentally Penguins head coach Red Sullivan was a former Ranger player and head coach. Earl Ingarfield, Ken Schinkel, Val Fonteyne, Mel Pearson, Al MacNeil, Noel Price, Billy Dea and Art Stratton had each spent time in their careers with the Rangers, but the Penguins' most prized acquisition was former Rangers star Andy Bathgate. Bathgate, then 34 years old, was near the end of his career and deemed expendable by the Red Wings, who had previously acquired his rights.

The rest of the roster was filled with minor-leaguers, particularly members of the Pittsburgh Hornets, the American Hockey League club which had served the Pittsburgh market since the late 1930s.

=== Expansion Draft ===
The Pittsburgh Penguins made 20 selections in the 1967 NHL Expansion Draft held in Montreal from June 5–7.

| Round # | Player | Position | Drafted from |
|---|---|---|---|
| 1 | Joe Daley | Goaltender | Detroit Red Wings |
| 2 | Roy Edwards | Goaltender | Chicago Black Hawks |
| 3 | Earl Ingarfield | Center | New York Rangers |
| 4 | Al MacNeil | Defense | New York Rangers |
| 5 | Larry Jeffrey | Left wing | Toronto Maple Leafs |
| 6 | Ab McDonald | Left wing | Detroit Red Wings |
| 7 | Leo Boivin | Defense | Detroit Red Wings |
| 8 | Noel Price | Defense | Montreal Canadiens |
| 9 | Keith McCreary | Right wing | Montreal Canadiens |
| 10 | Ken Schinkel | Right wing | New York Rangers |
| 11 | Bob Dillabough | Center | Boston Bruins |
| 12 | Art Stratton | Center | Chicago Black Hawks |
| 13 | Val Fonteyne | Left wing | Detroit Red Wings |
| 14 | Jeannot Gilbert | Center | Boston Bruins |
| 15 | Tom McCarthy | Left wing | Montreal Canadiens |
| 16 | Billy Dea | Left wing | Chicago Black Hawks |
| 17 | Bob Rivard | Center | Montreal Canadiens |
| 18 | Mel Pearson | Left wing | Chicago Black Hawks |
| 19 | Andy Bathgate | Right wing | Detroit Red Wings |
| 20 | Les Hunt | Defense | New York Rangers |

== Regular season ==
The Penguins' first general manager was Jack Riley. His team (along with the other expansion teams) was hampered by restrictive rules that kept most major talent with the "Original Six." Beyond aging sniper Andy Bathgate and tough defenceman Leo Boivin, the first Penguins team was manned by a cast of former minor-leaguers. The club missed the playoffs, but were a mere six points out of 1st place in the close-fought West Division.

- October 11, 1967 – Andy Bathgate of the Pittsburgh Penguins scores a goal in a 2–1 loss to the Montreal Canadiens. It was the first goal ever scored by a player for an expansion team.

=== Final standings ===
West Division
| | | GP | W | L | T | GF | GA | DIFF | Pts |
|---|---|---|---|---|---|---|---|---|---|
| 1 | Philadelphia Flyers | 74 | 31 | 32 | 11 | 173 | 179 | −6 | 73 |
| 2 | Los Angeles Kings | 74 | 31 | 33 | 10 | 200 | 224 | −24 | 72 |
| 3 | St. Louis Blues | 74 | 27 | 31 | 16 | 177 | 191 | −14 | 70 |
| 4 | Minnesota North Stars | 74 | 27 | 32 | 15 | 191 | 226 | −35 | 69 |
| 5 | Pittsburgh Penguins | 74 | 27 | 34 | 13 | 195 | 216 | −21 | 67 |
| 6 | Oakland Seals | 74 | 15 | 42 | 17 | 153 | 219 | −66 | 47 |

=== Record vs. opponents ===
==== Vs. West Division ====
1967–68 NHL records
| Team | LAK | MIN | OAK | PHI | PIT | STL | Total |
|---|---|---|---|---|---|---|---|
| Los Angeles | — | 2–6–2 | 4–4–2 | 5–4–1 | 6–4 | 4–3–3 | 21–21–8 |
| Minnesota | 6–2–2 | — | 5–2–3 | 3–6–1 | 3–4–3 | 3–5–2 | 20–19–11 |
| Oakland | 4–4–2 | 2–5–3 | — | 4–3–3 | 1–5–4 | 0–7–3 | 11–24–15 |
| Philadelphia | 4–5–1 | 6–3–1 | 3–4–3 | — | 3–4–3 | 7–1–2 | 23–17–10 |
| Pittsburgh | 4–6 | 4–3–3 | 5–1–4 | 4–3–3 | — | 4–6 | 21–19–10 |
| St. Louis | 3–4–3 | 5–3–2 | 7–0–3 | 1–7–2 | 6–4 | — | 22–18–10 |

==== Vs. East Division ====
1967–68 NHL records
| Team | BOS | CHI | DET | MTL | NYR | TOR | Total |
|---|---|---|---|---|---|---|---|
| Los Angeles | 1–3 | 1–2–1 | 2–1–1 | 2–2 | 2–2 | 2–2 | 10–12–2 |
| Minnesota | 2–2 | 1–3 | 2–2 | 1–2–1 | 0–2–2 | 1–2–1 | 7–13–4 |
| Oakland | 2–2 | 0–3–1 | 0–3–1 | 1–3 | 0–4 | 1–3 | 4–18–2 |
| Philadelphia | 1–3 | 1–3 | 1–3 | 1–2–1 | 1–3 | 3–1 | 8–15–1 |
| Pittsburgh | 2–2 | 1–2–1 | 1–3 | 0–4 | 0–3–1 | 2–1–1 | 6–15–3 |
| St. Louis | 1–2–1 | 0–2–2 | 1–2–1 | 0–3–1 | 1–3 | 2–1–1 | 5–13–6 |

== Schedule and results ==
1967–68 regular season
October: 3–6–1 (home: 2–3–1; road: 1–3–0) 7 points

| # | Oct | Visitor | Score | Home | Location/Attendance | Record | Points |
|---|---|---|---|---|---|---|---|
| 1 | 11 | Montreal Canadiens | 2–1 | Pittsburgh Penguins | Civic Arena (9,307) | 0–1–0 | 0 |
| 2 | 13 | Pittsburgh Penguins | 3–1 | St. Louis Blues | St. Louis Arena (5,126) | 1–1–0 | 2 |
| 3 | 14 | St. Louis Blues | 4–2 | Pittsburgh Penguins | Civic Arena (6,166) | 1–2–0 | 2 |
| 4 | 18 | Minnesota North Stars | 3–3 | Pittsburgh Penguins | Civic Arena (3,885) | 1–2–1 | 3 |
| 5 | 19 | Pittsburgh Penguins | 0–1 | Philadelphia Flyers | The Spectrum (7,812) | 1–3–1 | 3 |
| 6 | 21 | Chicago Black Hawks | 2–4 | Pittsburgh Penguins | Civic Arena (9,274) | 2–3–1 | 5 |
| 7 | 22 | Pittsburgh Penguins | 4–6 | New York Rangers | Madison Square Garden (III) (13,706) | 2–4–1 | 5 |
| 8 | 25 | California Seals | 1–4 | Pittsburgh Penguins | Civic Arena (3,819) | 3–4–1 | 7 |
| 9 | 28 | Los Angeles Kings | 5–3 | Pittsburgh Penguins | Civic Arena (6,536) | 3–5–1 | 7 |
| 10 | 29 | Pittsburgh Penguins | 2–4 | Boston Bruins | Boston Garden (13,909) | 3–6–1 | 7 |

November: 6–3–2 (home: 3–1–1; road: 3–2–1) 14 pints

| # | Nov | Visitor | Score | Home | Location/Attendance | Record | Points |
|---|---|---|---|---|---|---|---|
| 11 | 1 | Pittsburgh Penguins | 4–1 | Minnesota North Stars | Met Center (7,535) | 4–6–1 | 9 |
| 12 | 4 | Pittsburgh Penguins | 1–0 | California Seals | Oakland Coliseum Arena (4,549) | 5–6–1 | 11 |
| 13 | 8 | Philadelphia Flyers | 1–1 | Pittsburgh Penguins | Civic Arena (4,719) | 5–6–2 | 12 |
| 14 | 9 | Pittsburgh Penguins | 1–5 | Detroit Red Wings | Olympia Stadium (10,683) | 5–7–2 | 12 |
| 15 | 11 | St. Louis Blues | 5–1 | Pittsburgh Penguins | Civic Arena (7,183) | 5–8–2 | 12 |
| 16 | 15 | Philadelphia Flyers | 0–5 | Pittsburgh Penguins | Civic Arena (6,876) | 6–8–2 | 14 |
| 17 | 18 | Pittsburgh Penguins | 5–3 | St. Louis Blues | St. Louis Arena (7,715) | 7–8–2 | 16 |
| 18 | 22 | Boston Bruins | 1–4 | Pittsburgh Penguins | Civic Arena (9,701) | 8–8–2 | 18 |
| 19 | 24 | Pittsburgh Penguins | 3–5 | Los Angeles Kings | Great Western Forum (6,409) | 8–9–2 | 18 |
| 20 | 25 | Pittsburgh Penguins | 2–2 | California Seals | Oakland Coliseum Arena (5,977) | 8–9–3 | 19 |
| 21 | 29 | California Seals | 1–6 | Pittsburgh Penguins | Civic Arena (4,499) | 9–9–3 | 21 |

December: 4–8–2 (home: 2–3–2; road: 2–5–0) 10 points

| # | Dec | Visitor | Score | Home | Location/Attendance | Record | Points |
|---|---|---|---|---|---|---|---|
| 22 | 2 | New York Rangers | 4–1 | Pittsburgh Penguins | Civic Arena (9,725) | 9–10–3 | 21 |
| 23 | 3 | Pittsburgh Penguins | 1–6 | Detroit Red Wings | Olympia Stadium (12,215) | 9–11–3 | 21 |
| 24 | 6 | Pittsburgh Penguins | 2–7 | Chicago Black Hawks | Chicago Stadium (17,000) | 9–12–3 | 21 |
| 25 | 9 | Pittsburgh Penguins | 3–2 | Minnesota North Stars | Met Center (10,927) | 10–12–3 | 23 |
| 26 | 10 | Minnesota North Stars | 7–4 | Pittsburgh Penguins | Civic Arena (4,662) | 10–13–3 | 23 |
| 27 | 13 | Pittsburgh Penguins | 2–1 | Toronto Maple Leafs | Maple Leaf Gardens (15,718) | 11–13–3 | 25 |
| 28 | 16 | Chicago Black Hawks | 1–1 | Pittsburgh Penguins | Civic Arena (9,174) | 11–13–4 | 26 |
| 29 | 17 | Pittsburgh Penguins | 1–2 | Philadelphia Flyers | The Spectrum (7,522) | 11–14–4 | 26 |
| 30 | 21 | Pittsburgh Penguins | 1–4 | Los Angeles Kings | Great Western Forum (4,013) | 11–15–4 | 26 |
| 31 | 23 | Minnesota North Stars | 0–4 | Pittsburgh Penguins | Civic Arena (7,631) | 12–15–4 | 28 |
| 32 | 25 | Los Angeles Kings | 3–4 | Pittsburgh Penguins | Civic Arena (4,002) | 13–15–4 | 30 |
| 33 | 27 | Oakland Seals | 0–0 | Pittsburgh Penguins | Civic Arena (6,039) | 13–15–5 | 31 |
| 34 | 29 | Pittsburgh Penguins | 1–2 | St. Louis Blues | St. Louis Arena (8,286) | 13–16–5 | 31 |
| 35 | 30 | Detroit Red Wings | 5–2 | Pittsburgh Penguins | Civic Arena (9,041) | 13–17–5 | 31 |

January: 4–7–2 (home: 3–2–1; road: 1–5–1) 10 points

| # | Jan | Visitor | Score | Home | Location/Attendance | Record | Points |
|---|---|---|---|---|---|---|---|
| 36 | 4 | Los Angeles Kings | 3–4 | Pittsburgh Penguins | Civic Arena (4,202) | 14–17–5 | 33 |
| 37 | 6 | Philadelphia Flyers | 2–2 | Pittsburgh Penguins | Civic Arena (7,351) | 14–17–6 | 34 |
| 38 | 7 | Pittsburgh Penguins | 1–3 | Philadelphia Flyers | The Spectrum (7,935) | 14–18–6 | 34 |
| 39 | 10 | Montreal Canadiens | 4–3 | Pittsburgh Penguins | Civic Arena (5,580) | 14–19–6 | 34 |
| 40 | 12 | Toronto Maple Leafs | 3–4 | Pittsburgh Penguins | Civic Arena (8,292) | 15–19–6 | 36 |
| 41 | 13 | Pittsburgh Penguins | 0–7 | Toronto Maple Leafs | Maple Leaf Gardens (15,732) | 15–20–6 | 36 |
| 42 | 17 | Pittsburgh Penguins | 1–1 | Oakland Seals | Oakland Coliseum Arena (2,638) | 15–20–7 | 37 |
| 43 | 18 | Pittsburgh Penguins | 2–3 | Los Angeles Kings | Great Western Forum (5,755) | 15–21–7 | 37 |
| 44 | 20 | Detroit Red Wings | 5–8 | Pittsburgh Penguins | Civic Arena (10,547) | 16–21–7 | 39 |
| 45 | 21 | Pittsburgh Penguins | 3–4 | Minnesota North Stars | Met Center (9,298) | 16–22–7 | 39 |
| 46 | 27 | Los Angeles Kings | 5–3 | Pittsburgh Penguins | Civic Arena (11,156) | 16–23–7 | 39 |
| 47 | 28 | Pittsburgh Penguins | 1–0 | Boston Bruins | Boston Garden (13,909) | 17–23–7 | 41 |
| 48 | 31 | Pittsburgh Penguins | 4–9 | St. Louis Blues | St. Louis Arena (7,748) | 17–24–7 | 41 |

February: 4–5–3 (home: 2–3–3; road: 2–2–0) 11 points

| # | Feb | Visitor | Score | Home | Location/Attendance | Record | Points |
|---|---|---|---|---|---|---|---|
| 49 | 1 | St. Louis Blues | 0–2 | Pittsburgh Penguins | Civic Arena (5,980) | 18–24–7 | 43 |
| 50 | 3 | Toronto Maple Leafs | 3–3 | Pittsburgh Penguins | Civic Arena (12,563) | 18–24–8 | 44 |
| 51 | 7 | Pittsburgh Penguins | 4–1 | Oakland Seals | Oakland Coliseum Arena (5,283) | 19–24–8 | 46 |
| 52 | 8 | Pittsburgh Penguins | 1–3 | Los Angeles Kings | Great Western Forum (6,195) | 19–25–8 | 46 |
| 53 | 10 | New York Rangers | 2–2 | Pittsburgh Penguins | Civic Arena (10,237) | 19–25–9 | 47 |
| 54 | 14 | Minnesota North Stars | 3–6 | Pittsburgh Penguins | Civic Arena (6,133) | 20–25–9 | 49 |
| 55 | 16 | St. Louis Blues | 3–1 | Pittsburgh Penguins | Civic Arena (7,209) | 20–26–9 | 49 |
| 56 | 17 | Pittsburgh Penguins | 3–4 | Montreal Canadiens | Montreal Forum (14,687) | 20–27–9 | 49 |
| 57 | 21 | Philadelphia Flyers | 1–1 | Pittsburgh Penguins | Civic Arena (9,198) | 20–27–10 | 50 |
| 58 | 24 | Oakland Seals | 3–1 | Pittsburgh Penguins | Civic Arena (11,057) | 20–28–10 | 50 |
| 59 | 25 | Pittsburgh Penguins | 2–1 | Philadelphia Flyers | The Spectrum (14,418) | 21–28–10 | 52 |
| 60 | 27 | Boston Bruins | 5–3 | Pittsburgh Penguins | Civic Arena (6,546) | 21–29–10 | 52 |

March: 6–5–3 (home: 3–0–2; road: 3–5–1) 15 points

| # | Mar | Visitor | Score | Home | Location/Attendance | Record | Points |
|---|---|---|---|---|---|---|---|
| 61 | 2 | Oakland Seals | 6–6 | Pittsburgh Penguins | Civic Arena (7,390) | 21–29–11 | 53 |
| 62 | 6 | Pittsburgh Penguins | 2–4 | St. Louis Blues | St. Louis Arena (9,092) | 21–30–11 | 53 |
| 63 | 7 | Pittsburgh Penguins | 2–2 | Minnesota North Stars | Met Center (10,705) | 21–30–12 | 54 |
| 64 | 9 | Los Angeles Kings | 1–3 | Pittsburgh Penguins | Civic Arena (8,176) | 22–30–12 | 56 |
| 65 | 13 | Pittsburgh Penguins | 3–4 | Chicago Black Hawks | Chicago Stadium (16,666) | 22–31–12 | 56 |
| 66 | 16 | Pittsburgh Penguins | 4–6 | Montreal Canadiens | Montreal Forum (15,041) | 22–32–12 | 56 |
| 67 | 17 | Pittsburgh Penguins | 0–3 | New York Rangers | Madison Square Garden (III) (17,250) | 22–33–12 | 56 |
| 68 | 20 | St. Louis Blues | 2–4 | Pittsburgh Penguins | Civic Arena (6,126) | 23–33–12 | 58 |
| 69 | 23 | Pittsburgh Penguins | 0–3 | Minnesota North Stars | Met Center (11,910) | 23–34–12 | 58 |
| 70 | 24 | Minnesota North Stars | 4–4 | Pittsburgh Penguins | Civic Arena (7,229) | 23–34–13 | 59 |
| 71 | 26 | Pittsburgh Penguins | 2–1 | Los Angeles Kings | Great Western Forum (7,057) | 24–34–13 | 61 |
| 72 | 27 | Pittsburgh Penguins | 7–4 | Oakland Seals | Oakland Coliseum Arena (4,365) | 25–34–13 | 63 |
| 73 | 30 | Pittsburgh Penguins | 2–0 | Philadelphia Flyers | at Quebec City (5,569) | 26–34–13 | 65 |
| 74 | 31 | Philadelphia Flyers | 1–5 | Pittsburgh Penguins | Civic Arena (6,756) | 27–34–13 | 67 |

Legend: Win (2 points) Loss (0 points) Tie (1 point)

== Player statistics ==
Skaters

Regular season
| Player | GP | G | A | Pts | +/− | PIM |
|---|---|---|---|---|---|---|
| Andy Bathgate | 74 | 20 | 39 | 59 | -11 | 55 |
| Ab McDonald | 74 | 22 | 21 | 43 | -4 | 38 |
| Ken Schinkel | 57 | 14 | 25 | 39 | -10 | 19 |
| Art Stratton^{‡} | 58 | 16 | 21 | 37 | -6 | 16 |
| Earl Ingarfield | 50 | 15 | 22 | 37 | -8 | 12 |
| Val Fonteyne | 69 | 6 | 28 | 34 | -11 | 0 |
| Gene Ubriaco | 65 | 18 | 15 | 33 | -11 | 16 |
| Noel Price | 70 | 6 | 27 | 33 | -7 | 48 |
| Paul Andrea | 65 | 11 | 21 | 32 | -5 | 2 |
| Billy Dea | 73 | 16 | 12 | 28 | -14 | 6 |
| Keith McCreary | 70 | 14 | 12 | 26 | -3 | 44 |
| Leo Boivin | 73 | 9 | 13 | 22 | -16 | 74 |
| Bob Dillabough | 47 | 7 | 12 | 19 | -6 | 18 |
| Bob Rivard | 27 | 5 | 12 | 17 | 0 | 4 |
| Bill Speer | 68 | 3 | 13 | 16 | -12 | 44 |
| George Konik | 52 | 7 | 8 | 15 | -9 | 26 |
| Al MacNeil | 74 | 2 | 10 | 12 | -5 | 58 |
| Wayne Hicks^{†} | 15 | 4 | 7 | 11 | 2 | 2 |
| Dick Mattiussi | 32 | 0 | 2 | 2 | -9 | 18 |
| Dunc McCallum | 32 | 0 | 2 | 2 | -2 | 36 |
| Mel Pearson | 2 | 0 | 1 | 1 | -1 | 0 |
| Ted Lanyon | 5 | 0 | 0 | 0 | 1 | 4 |
| Total | | 195 | 323 | 518 | — | 540 |

Goaltenders

Regular Season
| Player | GP | GS | TOI | W | L | OT | T | GA | GAA | SA | SV% | SO | G | A | PIM |
|---|---|---|---|---|---|---|---|---|---|---|---|---|---|---|---|
| Les Binkley | 54 | 54 | 3139:01 | 20 | 24 | -- | 10 | 150 | 2.87 | 1585 | 0.905 | 6 | 0 | 0 | 0 |
| Hank Bassen | 25 | 20 | 1295:19 | 7 | 10 | -- | 3 | 62 | 2.87 | 685 | 0.909 | 1 | 0 | 0 | 8 |
| Total | | 74 | 4434:20 | 27 | 34 | 0 | 13 | 212 | 2.87 | 2270 | 0.907 | 7 | 0 | 0 | 8 |

^{†}Denotes player spent time with another team before joining the Penguins. Stats reflect time with the Penguins only.
^{‡}Denotes player was traded mid-season. Stats reflect time with the Penguins only.

== Awards and records ==
- Les Binkley recorded the first shutout in team history with a 1–0 win against Oakland on November 4.
- Andy Bathgate became the first Penguins player to earn 50 points in a season. He did so by recording an assist in a 6–6 tie against Oakland on March 2.
- Andy Bathgate became the first Penguins player to earn 20 goals in a season. He did so by scoring in a 4–6 loss against Montreal on March 16.
- Andy Bathgate, Al MacNeil and Ab McDonald each became the first players to suit up for all of the Penguins' games for an entire season.
- Les Binkley became the first Penguins goaltender to record 20 wins in a season. He did so in a 5–1 win against Philadelphia on March 30.
- By leading the team in scoring in its first season, Andy Bathgate set the Penguin's single season scoring record at 59 points.
- Noel Price became the first Penguin to lead defenseman in scoring. He set the Penguin's single season scoring record at 33 points.
- Leo Boivin set the team record for goals by a defenseman at 9.

== Transactions ==
The Penguins were involved in the following transactions during the 1967–68 season:

=== Trades ===
| September 7, 1967 | To Detroit Red Wings Roy Edwards | To Pittsburgh Penguins Hank Bassen |
| February 27, 1968 | To Philadelphia Flyers Art Stratton | To Pittsburgh Penguins Wayne Hicks cash |
| May 21, 1968 | To Boston Bruins cash | To Pittsburgh Penguins Jean Pronovost; John Arbour |
| June 11, 1968 | To Montreal Canadiens Al MacNeil | To Pittsburgh Penguins Wally Boyer |
| June 11, 1968 | To St. Louis Blues Ab McDonald | To Pittsburgh Penguins Lou Angotti |

=== Additions and subtractions ===
Additions
| Player | Former team | Via |
| Bill LeCaine | Port Huron Flags (IHL) | free agency (1967–08) |
| Marv Edwards | Nashville Dixie Flyers (EHL) | free agency (1967–09) |

Subtractions
| Player | New team | Via |

== Draft picks ==
=== Amateur draft ===
Pittsburgh Penguins' picks at the 1967 NHL Amateur Draft.

| Round | # | Player | Pos | Nationality | College/Junior/Club team |
|---|---|---|---|---|---|
| 1 | 2 | Steve Rexe | Goaltender | Canada | Belleville Seniors |
| 1 | 11 | Bob Smith | Center | Canada | Sault Ste. Marie Greyhounds |
