= 1967–68 Boston Bruins season =

NHL team season

1967–68 Boston Bruins
- Division: 3rd East
- 1967–68 record: 37–27–10
- Home record: 22–9–6
- Road record: 15–18–4
- Goals for: 259
- Goals against: 216

Team information
- General manager: Milt Schmidt
- Coach: Harry Sinden
- Captain: Vacant
- Alternate captains: Johnny Bucyk; Ted Green; Phil Esposito
- Arena: Boston Garden

Team leaders
- Goals: Phil Esposito (35)
- Assists: Phil Esposito (49)
- Points: Phil Esposito (84)
- Penalty minutes: Don Awrey (150)
- Wins: Gerry Cheevers (23)
- Goals against average: Gerry Cheevers (2.83)

The 1967–68 Boston Bruins season was the Bruins' 44th season in the NHL.

== Offseason ==
In 1967, the Black Hawks made a trade with the Boston Bruins that turned out to be one of the most one-sided in the history of the sport. Chicago sent young forwards Phil Esposito, Ken Hodge and Fred Stanfield to Boston in exchange for Pit Martin, Jack Norris and Gilles Marotte.

== Regular season ==
=== Season standings ===
East Division
		GP	W	L	T	GF	GA	DIFF	Pts
1	Montreal Canadiens	74	42	22	10	236	167	+69	94
2	New York Rangers	74	39	23	12	226	183	+43	90
3	Boston Bruins	74	37	27	10	259	216	+43	84
4	Chicago Black Hawks	74	32	26	16	212	222	−10	80
5	Toronto Maple Leafs	74	33	31	10	209	176	+33	76
6	Detroit Red Wings	74	27	35	12	245	257	−12	66

=== Record vs. opponents ===
==== Vs. East Division ====
1967–68 NHL records
Team	BOS	CHI	DET	MTL	NYR	TOR	Total
Boston	—	5–3–2	5–3–2	5–5	6–2–2	2–5–3	23–18–9
Chicago	3–5–2	—	4–3–3	2–6–2	3–4–3	5–4–1	17–22–11
Detroit	3–5–2	3–4–3	—	3–6–1	3–5–2	1–8–1	13–28–9
Montreal	5–5	6–2–2	6–3–1	—	4–4–2	5–3–2	26–17–7
New York	2–6–2	4–3–3	5–3–2	4–4–2	—	7–3	22–19–9
Toronto	5–2–3	4–5–1	8–1–1	3–5–2	3–7	—	23–20–7

==== Vs. West Division ====
1967–68 NHL records
Team	LAK	MIN	OAK	PHI	PIT	STL	Total
Boston	3–1	2–2	2–2	3–1	2–2	2–1–1	14–9–1
Chicago	2–1–1	3–1	3–0–1	3–1	2–1–1	2–0–2	15–4–5
Detroit	1–2–1	2–2	3–0–1	3–1	3–1	2–1–1	14–7–3
Montreal	2–2	2–1–1	3–1	2–1–1	4–0	3–0–1	16–5–3
New York	2–2	2–0–2	4–0	3–1	3–0–1	3–1	17–4–3
Toronto	2–2	2–1–1	3–1	1–3	1–2–1	1–2–1	10–11–3

== Schedule and results ==
1967–68 regular season
October

Game	Result	Date	Score	Opponent	Record
1	T	October 11, 1967	4–4	Detroit Red Wings (1967–68)	0–0–1
2	W	October 15, 1967	6–2	Montreal Canadiens (1967–68)	1–0–1
3	W	October 18, 1967	7–1	@ Chicago Black Hawks (1967–68)	2–0–1
4	W	October 19, 1967	6–3	@ Detroit Red Wings (1967–68)	3–0–1
5	L	October 21, 1967	2–4	@ Montreal Canadiens (1967–68)	3–1–1
6	W	October 26, 1967	2–0	Los Angeles Kings (1967–68)	4–1–1
7	W	October 29, 1967	4–2	Pittsburgh Penguins (1967–68)	5–1–1

November

Game	Result	Date	Score	Opponent	Record
8	L	November 1, 1967	1–5	@ St. Louis Blues (1967–68)	5–2–1
9	T	November 5, 1967	2–2	Toronto Maple Leafs (1967–68)	5–2–2
10	W	November 8, 1967	6–3	@ New York Rangers (1967–68)	6–2–2
11	W	November 11, 1967	2–1	California Seals (1967–68)	7–2–2
12	L	November 12, 1967	2–4	Philadelphia Flyers (1967–68)	7–3–2
13	L	November 15, 1967	2–4	@ Toronto Maple Leafs (1967–68)	7–4–2
14	W	November 18, 1967	3–1	New York Rangers (1967–68)	8–4–2
15	W	November 19, 1967	6–2	Toronto Maple Leafs (1967–68)	9–4–2
16	L	November 22, 1967	1–4	@ Pittsburgh Penguins (1967–68)	9–5–2
17	W	November 23, 1967	4–2	New York Rangers (1967–68)	10–5–2
18	W	November 25, 1967	3–1	@ Montreal Canadiens (1967–68)	11–5–2
19	W	November 26, 1967	7–5	Detroit Red Wings (1967–68)	12–5–2
20	W	November 29, 1967	5–1	Minnesota North Stars (1967–68)	13–5–2

December

Game	Result	Date	Score	Opponent	Record
21	T	December 2, 1967	4–4	Chicago Black Hawks (1967–68)	13–5–3
22	W	December 3, 1967	5–3	Montreal Canadiens (1967–68)	14–5–3
23	W	December 7, 1967	3–1	New York Rangers (1967–68)	15–5–3
24	T	December 9, 1967	3–3	@ Toronto Maple Leafs (1967–68)	15–5–4
25	L	December 10, 1967	1–3	Los Angeles Kings (1967–68)	15–6–4
26	L	December 13, 1967	2–6	Montreal Canadiens (1967–68)	15–7–4
27	L	December 15, 1967	1–4	@ Oakland Seals (1967–68)	15–8–4
28	W	December 16, 1967	5–2	@ Los Angeles Kings (1967–68)	16–8–4
29	L	December 20, 1967	3–6	@ Chicago Black Hawks (1967–68)	16–9–4
30	W	December 23, 1967	4–0	@ New York Rangers (1967–68)	17–9–4
31	W	December 25, 1967	6–3	Oakland Seals (1967–68)	18–9–4
32	W	December 27, 1967	7–2	Chicago Black Hawks (1967–68)	19–9–4
33	L	December 30, 1967	4–5	@ Minnesota North Stars (1967–68)	19–10–4
34	L	December 31, 1967	4–6	@ Detroit Red Wings (1967–68)	19–11–4

January

Game	Result	Date	Score	Opponent	Record
35	T	January 3, 1968	5–5	@ New York Rangers (1967–68)	19–11–5
36	W	January 4, 1968	3–2	@ Philadelphia Flyers (1967–68)	20–11–5
37	T	January 6, 1968	3–3	@ Toronto Maple Leafs (1967–68)	20–11–6
38	L	January 7, 1968	2–4	@ Chicago Black Hawks (1967–68)	20–12–6
39	W	January 11, 1968	5–4	Detroit Red Wings (1967–68)	21–12–6
40	L	January 13, 1968	1–5	@ Montreal Canadiens (1967–68)	21–13–6
41	W	January 14, 1968	9–2	Minnesota North Stars (1967–68)	22–13–6
42	L	January 18, 1968	2–4	Toronto Maple Leafs (1967–68)	22–14–6
43	W	January 20, 1968	4–2	Philadelphia Flyers (1967–68)	23–14–6
44	W	January 21, 1968	6–0	Chicago Black Hawks (1967–68)	24–14–6
45	L	January 24, 1968	1–2	@ New York Rangers (1967–68)	24–15–6
46	L	January 25, 1968	0–2	Montreal Canadiens (1967–68)	24–16–6
47	L	January 27, 1968	2–5	@ Montreal Canadiens (1967–68)	24–17–6
48	L	January 28, 1968	0–1	Pittsburgh Penguins (1967–68)	24–18–6

February

Game	Result	Date	Score	Opponent	Record
49	T	February 1, 1968	4–4	Chicago Black Hawks (1967–68)	24–18–7
50	T	February 3, 1968	3–3	New York Rangers (1967–68)	24–18–8
51	W	February 4, 1968	5–4	Detroit Red Wings (1967–68)	25–18–8
52	W	February 7, 1968	6–4	@ St. Louis Blues (1967–68)	26–18–8
53	T	February 10, 1968	1–1	@ Detroit Red Wings (1967–68)	26–18–9
54	T	February 11, 1968	3–3	St. Louis Blues (1967–68)	26–18–10
55	L	February 14, 1968	1–3	@ Chicago Black Hawks (1967–68)	26–19–10
56	L	February 17, 1968	1–3	@ Oakland Seals (1967–68)	26–20–10
57	W	February 18, 1968	6–5	@ Los Angeles Kings (1967–68)	27–20–10
58	L	February 21, 1968	3–5	@ Minnesota North Stars (1967–68)	27–21–10
59	W	February 22, 1968	3–2	@ Detroit Red Wings (1967–68)	28–21–10
60	L	February 24, 1968	0–1	@ Toronto Maple Leafs (1967–68)	28–22–10
61	W	February 27, 1968	5–3	@ Pittsburgh Penguins (1967–68)	29–22–10
62	W	February 29, 1968	4–1	Toronto Maple Leafs (1967–68)	30–22–10

March

Game	Result	Date	Score	Opponent	Record
63	W	March 3, 1968	9–3	St. Louis Blues (1967–68)	31–22–10
64	W	March 6, 1968	5–3	@ Chicago Black Hawks (1967–68)	32–22–10
65	W	March 7, 1968	2–1	@ Philadelphia Flyers (1967–68)	33–22–10
66	L	March 10, 1968	5–7	Detroit Red Wings (1967–68)	33–23–10
67	W	March 13, 1968	2–1	@ New York Rangers (1967–68)	34–23–10
68	L	March 16, 1968	0–3	@ Toronto Maple Leafs (1967–68)	34–24–10
69	W	March 17, 1968	3–1	Montreal Canadiens (1967–68)	35–24–10
70	W	March 21, 1968	8–0	Chicago Black Hawks (1967–68)	36–24–10
71	L	March 24, 1968	3–5	@ Detroit Red Wings (1967–68)	36–25–10
72	L	March 28, 1968	4–5	New York Rangers (1967–68)	36–26–10
73	W	March 30, 1968	2–1	@ Montreal Canadiens (1967–68)	37–26–10
74	L	March 31, 1968	1–4	Toronto Maple Leafs (1967–68)	37–27–10

Legend: Win (2 points) Loss (0 points) Tie (1 point)

== Player statistics ==
=== Regular season ===
Scoring

Player	Pos	GP	G	A	Pts	PIM	PPG	SHG	GWG
Phil Esposito	C	74	35	49	84	21	9	1	3
John Bucyk	LW	72	30	39	69	8	6	1	4
John McKenzie	RW	74	28	38	66	107	7	0	4
Fred Stanfield	LW	73	20	44	64	10	3	0	1
Ken Hodge	RW	74	25	31	56	31	5	0	3
Tommy Williams	RW	68	18	32	50	14	0	0	4
Derek Sanderson	C	71	24	25	49	98	4	1	6
Ted Green	D	72	7	36	43	133	3	0	0
Eddie Shack	LW	70	23	19	42	107	4	0	6
Ed Westfall	D/RW	73	14	22	36	38	1	2	2
Bobby Orr	D	46	11	20	31	63	3	0	1
Dallas Smith	D	74	4	23	27	65	0	0	1
Glen Sather	LW	65	8	12	20	34	0	2	1
Don Awrey	D	74	3	12	15	150	0	0	0
Skip Krake	C	68	5	7	12	13	0	3	0
Gary Doak	D	59	2	10	12	100	0	0	1
Ross Lonsberry	LW	19	2	2	4	12	0	0	0
Wayne Cashman	LW	12	0	4	4	2	0	0	0
Gerry Cheevers	G	47	0	2	2	8	0	0	0
John Arbour	D	4	0	1	1	11	0	0	0
Ron Murphy	LW	12	0	1	1	4	0	0	0
Barry Gibbs	D	16	0	0	0	2	0	0	0
Andre Gill	G	5	0	0	0	0	0	0	0
Eddie Johnston	G	28	0	0	0	0	0	0	0

Goaltending

Player	MIN	GP	W	L	T	GA	GAA	SO
Gerry Cheevers	2646	47	23	17	5	125	2.83	3
Eddie Johnston	1524	28	11	8	5	73	2.87	0
Andre Gill	270	5	3	2	0	13	2.89	1
Team:	4440	74	37	27	10	211	2.85	4

=== Playoffs ===
Scoring

Player	Pos	GP	G	A	Pts	PIM	PPG	SHG	GWG
Ken Hodge	RW	4	3	0	3	2	0	0	0
Phil Esposito	C	4	0	3	3	0	0	0	0
Ed Westfall	D/RW	4	2	0	2	2	0	0	0
Ted Green	D	4	1	1	2	11	1	0	0
John McKenzie	RW	4	1	1	2	8	0	0	0
John Bucyk	LW	3	0	2	2	0	0	0	0
Bobby Orr	D	4	0	2	2	2	0	0	0
Derek Sanderson	C	4	0	2	2	9	0	0	0
Dallas Smith	D	4	0	2	2	0	0	0	0
Tommy Williams	RW	4	1	0	1	2	0	0	0
Don Awrey	D	4	0	1	1	4	0	0	0
Eddie Shack	LW	4	0	1	1	6	0	0	0
Fred Stanfield	LW	4	0	1	1	0	0	0	0
Wayne Cashman	LW	1	0	0	0	0	0	0	0
Gerry Cheevers	G	4	0	0	0	4	0	0	0
Gary Doak	D	4	0	0	0	4	0	0	0
Skip Krake	C	4	0	0	0	2	0	0	0
Ron Murphy	LW	4	0	0	0	0	0	0	0
Glen Sather	LW	3	0	0	0	0	0	0	0

Goaltending

Player	MIN	GP	W	L	GA	GAA	SO
Gerry Cheevers	240	4	0	4	15	3.75	0
Team:	240	4	0	4	15	3.75	0

Note:

Pos = Position;GP = Games played; G = Goals; A = Assists; Pts = Points; PIM = Penalty minutes; +/- = Plus/minus; PPG = Power-play goals; SHG = Short-handed goals; GWG = Game-winning goals
Pos = Position;GP = Games played; Min, TOI = Minutes played; W = Wins; L = Losses; T,T/OT = Ties; OTL = Overtime losses; GA = Goals-against; GAA = Goals-against average; SO = Shutouts; SA = Shots against; SV = Shots saved;SV% = Save percentage;

== Draft picks ==
Boston's picks at the 1967 NHL entry draft.

Round	#	Player	Position	Nationality	College/junior/club team (league)
1	10	Meehan Bonnar	Right wing	Canada	St. Thomas Stars (WOJBHL)
