= 1967–68 Detroit Red Wings season =

Sports season

1967–68 Detroit Red Wings
- Division: 6th East
- 1967–68 record: 27–35–12
- Home record: 18–15–4
- Road record: 9–20–8
- Goals for: 245
- Goals against: 257

Team information
- General manager: Sid Abel
- Coach: Sid Abel
- Captain: Alex Delvecchio
- Alternate captains: Dean Prentice
- Arena: Detroit Olympia

Team leaders
- Goals: Gordie Howe (39)
- Assists: Alex Delvecchio (48)
- Points: Gordie Howe (82)
- Penalty minutes: Gary Bergman (109)
- Wins: Roy Edwards (15)
- Goals against average: Roger Crozier (3.30)

The 1967–68 Detroit Red Wings season was the franchise's 42nd season of competition, 36th season as the Red Wings. The Wings finished last in the East Division, and missed the play-offs for the second straight season for the first time since the 1929–30 season and the 1930–31 season.

== Regular season ==
=== Final standings ===
East Division
		GP	W	L	T	GF	GA	DIFF	Pts
1	Montreal Canadiens	74	42	22	10	236	167	+69	94
2	New York Rangers	74	39	23	12	226	183	+43	90
3	Boston Bruins	74	37	27	10	259	216	+43	84
4	Chicago Black Hawks	74	32	26	16	212	222	−10	80
5	Toronto Maple Leafs	74	33	31	10	209	176	+33	76
6	Detroit Red Wings	74	27	35	12	245	257	−12	66

=== Record vs. opponents ===
==== Vs. East Division ====
1967–68 NHL records
Team	BOS	CHI	DET	MTL	NYR	TOR	Total
Boston	—	5–3–2	5–3–2	5–5	6–2–2	2–5–3	23–18–9
Chicago	3–5–2	—	4–3–3	2–6–2	3–4–3	5–4–1	17–22–11
Detroit	3–5–2	3–4–3	—	3–6–1	3–5–2	1–8–1	13–28–9
Montreal	5–5	6–2–2	6–3–1	—	4–4–2	5–3–2	26–17–7
New York	2–6–2	4–3–3	5–3–2	4–4–2	—	7–3	22–19–9
Toronto	5–2–3	4–5–1	8–1–1	3–5–2	3–7	—	23–20–7

==== Vs. West Division ====
1967–68 NHL records
Team	LAK	MIN	OAK	PHI	PIT	STL	Total
Boston	3–1	2–2	2–2	3–1	2–2	2–1–1	14–9–1
Chicago	2–1–1	3–1	3–0–1	3–1	2–1–1	2–0–2	15–4–5
Detroit	1–2–1	2–2	3–0–1	3–1	3–1	2–1–1	14–7–3
Montreal	2–2	2–1–1	3–1	2–1–1	4–0	3–0–1	16–5–3
New York	2–2	2–0–2	4–0	3–1	3–0–1	3–1	17–4–3
Toronto	2–2	2–1–1	3–1	1–3	1–2–1	1–2–1	10–11–3

== Schedule and results ==
1967–68 regular season
October

Game	Result	Date	Score	Opponent	Record
1	T	October 11, 1967	4–4	@ Boston Bruins (1967–68)	0–0–1
2	L	October 14, 1967	2–6	@ Montreal Canadiens (1967–68)	0–1–1
3	W	October 15, 1967	3–2	New York Rangers (1967–68)	1–1–1
4	W	October 18, 1967	3–2	@ Toronto Maple Leafs (1967–68)	2–1–1
5	L	October 19, 1967	3–6	Boston Bruins (1967–68)	2–2–1
6	W	October 22, 1967	1–0	St. Louis Blues (1967–68)	3–2–1
7	W	October 26, 1967	8–2	California Seals (1967–68)	4–2–1
8	W	October 28, 1967	3–1	@ Philadelphia Flyers (1967–68)	5–2–1
9	W	October 29, 1967	5–1	Chicago Black Hawks (1967–68)	6–2–1

November

Game	Result	Date	Score	Opponent	Record
10	L	November 2, 1967	3–9	Toronto Maple Leafs (1967–68)	6–3–1
11	L	November 4, 1967	2–3	@ St. Louis Blues (1967–68)	6–4–1
12	L	November 5, 1967	4–6	Los Angeles Kings (1967–68)	6–5–1
13	W	November 9, 1967	5–1	Pittsburgh Penguins (1967–68)	7–5–1
14	W	November 12, 1967	3–1	Montreal Canadiens (1967–68)	8–5–1
15	T	November 16, 1967	1–1	@ California Seals (1967–68)	8–5–2
16	W	November 17, 1967	4–1	@ Los Angeles Kings (1967–68)	9–5–2
17	T	November 19, 1967	2–2	@ Chicago Black Hawks (1967–68)	9–5–3
18	L	November 22, 1967	2–4	@ Philadelphia Flyers (1967–68)	9–6–3
19	L	November 25, 1967	2–3	@ Toronto Maple Leafs (1967–68)	9–7–3
20	L	November 26, 1967	5–7	@ Boston Bruins (1967–68)	9–8–3
21	W	November 29, 1967	3–1	@ New York Rangers (1967–68)	10–8–3
22	T	November 30, 1967	3–3	Toronto Maple Leafs (1967–68)	10–8–4

December

Game	Result	Date	Score	Opponent	Record
23	W	December 3, 1967	6–1	Pittsburgh Penguins (1967–68)	11–8–4
24	T	December 6, 1967	3–3	@ New York Rangers (1967–68)	11–8–5
25	T	December 7, 1967	2–2	@ Montreal Canadiens (1967–68)	11–8–6
26	W	December 9, 1967	3–2	New York Rangers (1967–68)	12–8–6
27	L	December 14, 1967	1–3	Chicago Black Hawks (1967–68)	12–9–6
28	L	December 16, 1967	3–4	@ Montreal Canadiens (1967–68)	12–10–6
29	W	December 17, 1967	8–6	Montreal Canadiens (1967–68)	13–10–6
30	L	December 20, 1967	0–2	@ New York Rangers (1967–68)	13–11–6
31	L	December 23, 1967	3–5	@ Toronto Maple Leafs (1967–68)	13–12–6
32	L	December 25, 1967	1–3	Toronto Maple Leafs (1967–68)	13–13–6
33	W	December 28, 1967	5–3	Philadelphia Flyers (1967–68)	14–13–6
34	W	December 30, 1967	5–2	@ Pittsburgh Penguins (1967–68)	15–13–6
35	W	December 31, 1967	6–4	Boston Bruins (1967–68)	16–13–6

January

Game	Result	Date	Score	Opponent	Record
36	W	January 4, 1968	9–3	Oakland Seals (1967–68)	17–13–6
37	L	January 6, 1968	2–6	@ Chicago Black Hawks (1967–68)	17–14–6
38	L	January 7, 1968	3–4	Montreal Canadiens (1967–68)	17–15–6
39	L	January 10, 1968	1–2	@ Toronto Maple Leafs (1967–68)	17–16–6
40	L	January 11, 1968	4–5	@ Boston Bruins (1967–68)	17–17–6
41	T	January 13, 1968	4–4	Chicago Black Hawks (1967–68)	17–17–7
42	L	January 17, 1968	1–6	@ Montreal Canadiens (1967–68)	17–18–7
43	L	January 20, 1968	5–8	@ Pittsburgh Penguins (1967–68)	17–19–7
44	L	January 21, 1968	0–2	Toronto Maple Leafs (1967–68)	17–20–7
45	W	January 24, 1968	4–2	@ Chicago Black Hawks (1967–68)	18–20–7
46	T	January 25, 1968	4–4	St. Louis Blues (1967–68)	18–20–8
47	W	January 27, 1968	3–2	Philadelphia Flyers (1967–68)	19–20–8
48	L	January 28, 1968	1–2	@ Minnesota North Stars (1967–68)	19–21–8

February

Game	Result	Date	Score	Opponent	Record
49	L	February 1, 1968	6–8	Los Angeles Kings (1967–68)	19–22–8
50	W	February 3, 1968	8–1	Minnesota North Stars (1967–68)	20–22–8
51	L	February 4, 1968	4–5	@ Boston Bruins (1967–68)	20–23–8
52	L	February 8, 1968	2–3	New York Rangers (1967–68)	20–24–8
53	T	February 10, 1968	1–1	Boston Bruins (1967–68)	20–24–9
54	T	February 11, 1968	3–3	@ New York Rangers (1967–68)	20–24–10
55	L	February 15, 1968	0–2	Montreal Canadiens (1967–68)	20–25–10
56	L	February 17, 1968	4–7	Chicago Black Hawks (1967–68)	20–26–10
57	L	February 18, 1968	1–7	@ Chicago Black Hawks (1967–68)	20–27–10
58	L	February 22, 1968	2–3	Boston Bruins (1967–68)	20–28–10
59	W	February 24, 1968	3–1	Minnesota North Stars (1967–68)	21–28–10
60	L	February 29, 1968	2–4	New York Rangers (1967–68)	21–29–10

March

Game	Result	Date	Score	Opponent	Record
61	W	March 3, 1968	5–2	Montreal Canadiens (1967–68)	22–29–10
62	L	March 6, 1968	1–6	@ New York Rangers (1967–68)	22–30–10
63	L	March 9, 1968	5–7	@ Toronto Maple Leafs (1967–68)	22–31–10
64	W	March 10, 1968	7–5	@ Boston Bruins (1967–68)	23–31–10
65	T	March 12, 1968	2–2	@ Los Angeles Kings (1967–68)	23–31–11
66	W	March 13, 1968	4–2	@ Oakland Seals (1967–68)	24–31–11
67	W	March 16, 1968	6–3	@ St. Louis Blues (1967–68)	25–31–11
68	L	March 17, 1968	1–5	@ Minnesota North Stars (1967–68)	25–32–11
69	L	March 21, 1968	2–5	Toronto Maple Leafs (1967–68)	25–33–11
70	L	March 23, 1968	4–7	@ Montreal Canadiens (1967–68)	25–34–11
71	W	March 24, 1968	5–3	Boston Bruins (1967–68)	26–34–11
72	W	March 28, 1968	3–1	Chicago Black Hawks (1967–68)	27–34–11
73	L	March 30, 1968	1–3	New York Rangers (1967–68)	27–35–11
74	T	March 31, 1968	5–5	@ Chicago Black Hawks (1967–68)	27–35–12

Legend: Win (2 points) Loss (0 points) Tie (1 point)

== Player statistics ==
=== Regular season ===
Scoring

Player	Pos	GP	G	A	Pts	PIM	PPG	SHG	GWG
Gordie Howe	RW	74	39	43	82	53	10	0	4
Alex Delvecchio	C/LW	74	22	48	70	14	3	0	2
Norm Ullman	C	58	30	25	55	26	7	0	4
Dean Prentice	LW	69	17	38	55	42	4	1	2
Gary Bergman	D	74	13	28	41	109	5	2	3
Gary Jarrett	LW	68	18	21	39	20	1	0	2
Floyd Smith	RW	57	18	21	39	14	5	1	2
Bruce MacGregor	C	71	15	24	39	13	1	0	0
Paul Henderson	RW	50	13	20	33	35	4	0	2
Ted Hampson	C	37	9	18	27	10	0	0	2
Howie Young	D/RW	62	2	17	19	112	0	0	0
Doug Roberts	RW	37	8	9	17	12	1	0	1
Kent Douglas	D	36	7	10	17	46	0	0	0
Frank Mahovlich	LW	13	7	9	16	2	0	0	1
Bart Crashley	D	57	2	14	16	18	0	0	0
Garry Unger	C	13	5	10	15	2	0	0	0
Jimmy Peters	C	45	5	6	11	8	1	0	1
Pete Mahovlich	C	15	6	4	10	13	0	0	0
Pete Stemkowski	C	13	3	6	9	4	0	0	0
Bert Marshall	D	37	1	5	6	56	0	0	0
Gary Marsh	LW	6	1	3	4	4	0	0	1
Nick Libett	LW	22	2	1	3	12	1	0	0
Bob Falkenberg	D	20	0	3	3	10	0	0	0
Jean-Guy Talbot	D	32	0	3	3	10	0	0	0
Jim Watson	D	61	0	3	3	87	0	0	0
Ron Anderson	RW	18	2	0	2	13	0	0	0
John Brenneman	LW	9	0	2	2	0	0	0	0
Warren Godfrey	D	12	0	1	1	0	0	0	0
Irv Spencer	D	5	0	1	1	4	0	0	0
Roger Crozier	G	34	0	0	0	2	0	0	0
Roy Edwards	G	41	0	0	0	0	0	0	0
George Gardner	G	12	0	0	0	0	0	0	0
Galen Head	RW	1	0	0	0	0	0	0	0
Danny Lawson	RW	1	0	0	0	0	0	0	0
Rick McCann	C	3	0	0	0	0	0	0	0
Bob McCord	D	3	0	0	0	2	0	0	0
Dave Richardson	LW	1	0	0	0	0	0	0	0

Goaltending

Player	MIN	GP	W	L	T	GA	GAA	SO
Roy Edwards	2177	41	15	15	8	127	3.50	0
Roger Crozier	1729	34	9	18	2	95	3.30	1
George Gardner	534	12	3	2	2	32	3.60	0
Team:	4440	74	27	35	12	254	3.43	1

Note: GP = Games played; G = Goals; A = Assists; Pts = Points; +/- = Plus-minus PIM = Penalty minutes; PPG = Power-play goals; SHG = Short-handed goals; GWG = Game-winning goals;
MIN = Minutes played; W = Wins; L = Losses; T = Ties; GA = Goals against; GAA = Goals-against average; SO = Shutouts;

== Draft picks ==
Detroit's draft picks at the 1967 NHL amateur draft held at the Queen Elizabeth Hotel in Montreal.

Round	#	Player	Nationality	College/Junior/Club team (League)
1	9	Ron Barkwell	Canada	Flin Flon Bombers (MJHL)
2	17	Al Karlander	Canada	Michigan Tech Huskies (NCAA)

== See also ==
- 1967–68 NHL season
