= Noel Price =

Canadian ice hockey player (born 1935)

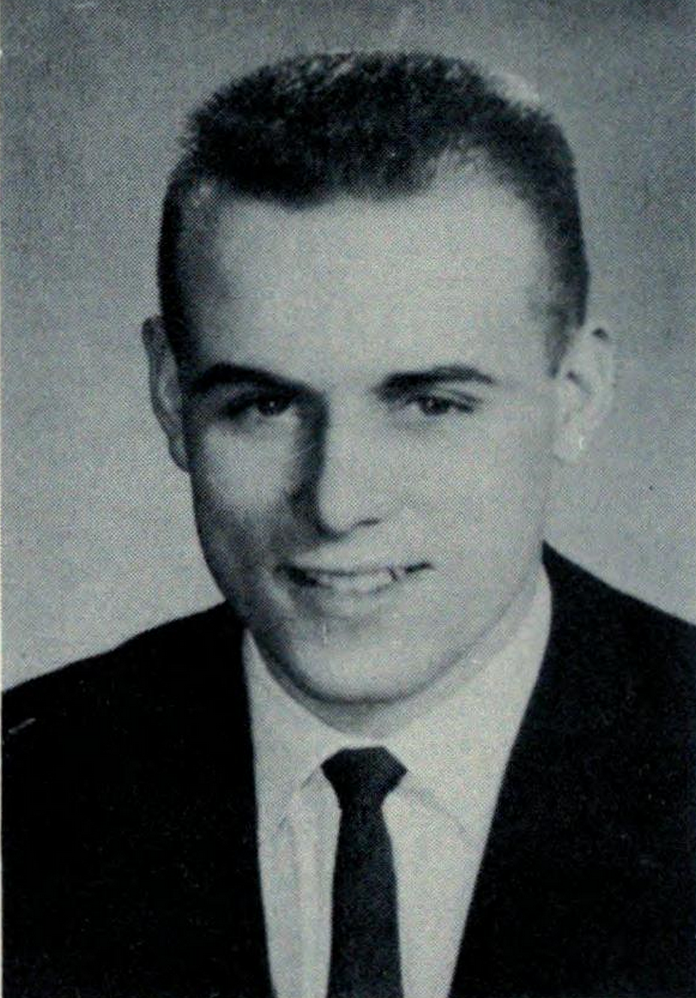
- at St. Michaels College, c. 1955
- Born: December 9, 1935 (age 90) Brockville, Ontario, Canada
- Height: 6 ft 0 in (183 cm)
- Weight: 185 lb (84 kg; 13 st 3 lb)
- Position: Defence
- Shot: Left
- Played for: Toronto Maple Leafs; New York Rangers; Detroit Red Wings; Montreal Canadiens; Los Angeles Kings; Pittsburgh Penguins; Atlanta Flames
- Playing career: 1956–1976

Garry Noel Price (born December 9, 1935) is a Canadian former professional ice hockey defenceman. He played in the National Hockey League with seven teams between 1957 and 1976. He also spent considerable time in the minor American Hockey League during his career, which lasted from 1956 to 1976.

Price started his National Hockey League career with the Toronto Maple Leafs in 1958. He would also play for the New York Rangers, Detroit Red Wings, Montreal Canadiens, Los Angeles Kings, Pittsburgh Penguins and Atlanta Flames. He won one Stanley Cup with Montreal in 1966. He was traded along with Denis DeJordy, Dale Hoganson and Doug Robinson from the Kings to the Canadiens for Rogie Vachon on November 4, 1971. He retired after the 1976 season as the last remaining active member of the Pittsburgh Penguins' 1967–68 expansion team.

== Career statistics ==
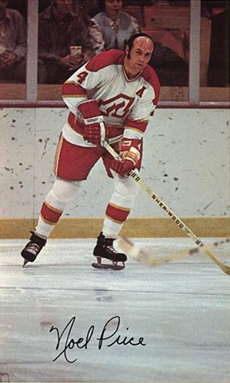
1972 photo of Noel Price for Atlanta Flames

=== Regular season and playoffs ===
			Regular season					Playoffs
Season	Team	League	GP	G	A	Pts	PIM	GP	G	A	Pts	PIM
1952–53	St. Michael's Majors	OHA	44	0	4	4	120	17	1	4	5	28
1953–54	St. Michael's Majors	OHA	58	6	5	11	157	8	1	2	3	31
1954–55	St. Michael's Majors	OHA	47	4	11	15	129	5	1	2	3	12
1955–56	St. Michael's Majors	OHA	46	10	22	32	84	8	1	0	1	8
1956–57	Rochester Americans	AHL	1	1	1	2	0	10	0	1	1	16
1956–57	Winnipeg Warriors	WHL	70	5	22	27	142	—	—	—	—	—
1957–58	Toronto Maple Leafs	NHL	1	0	0	0	5	—	—	—	—	—
1957–58	Rochester Americans	AHL	69	4	20	24	153	—	—	—	—	—
1958–59	Toronto Maple Leafs	NHL	28	0	0	0	4	5	0	0	0	2
1959–60	New York Rangers	NHL	6	0	0	0	2	—	—	—	—	—
1959–60	Springfield Indians	AHL	31	0	6	6	52	10	1	3	4	20
1960–61	New York Rangers	NHL	1	0	0	0	2	—	—	—	—	—
1960–61	Springfield Indians	AHL	71	6	21	27	97	8	1	4	5	30
1961–62	Springfield Indians	AHL	47	4	19	23	75	—	—	—	—	—
1961–62	Detroit Red Wings	NHL	20	0	1	1	6	—	—	—	—	—
1962–63	Baltimore Clippers	AHL	68	7	29	36	103	3	0	0	0	4
1963–64	Baltimore Clippers	AHL	72	6	35	41	109	—	—	—	—	—
1964–65	Baltimore Clippers	AHL	72	4	35	39	78	5	0	2	2	4
1965–66	Montreal Canadiens	NHL	15	0	6	6	8	3	0	1	1	0
1965–66	Quebec Aces	AHL	55	8	20	28	48	—	—	—	—	—
1966–67	Montreal Canadiens	NHL	24	0	3	3	8	—	—	—	—	—
1966–67	Quebec Aces	AHL	47	3	23	26	60	5	1	4	5	2
1967–68	Pittsburgh Penguins	NHL	70	6	27	33	48	—	—	—	—	—
1968–69	Pittsburgh Penguins	NHL	73	2	18	20	61	—	—	—	—	—
1969–70	Springfield Kings	AHL	72	10	44	54	58	14	1	3	4	14
1970–71	Los Angeles Kings	NHL	62	1	19	20	29	—	—	—	—	—
1971–72	Springfield Kings	AHL	9	1	3	4	6	—	—	—	—	—
1971–72	Nova Scotia Voyageurs	AHL	64	3	26	29	81	15	4	7	11	16
1972–73	Atlanta Flames	NHL	54	1	13	14	38	—	—	—	—	—
1973–74	Atlanta Flames	NHL	62	0	13	13	38	4	0	0	0	6
1974–75	Atlanta Flames	NHL	80	4	14	18	82	—	—	—	—	—
1975–76	Atlanta Flames	NHL	3	0	0	0	2	—	—	—	—	—
1975–76	Nova Scotia Voyageurs	AHL	73	2	37	39	55	8	0	7	7	12
AHL totals			751	59	319	378	975	78	8	31	39	118
NHL totals			499	14	114	128	333	12	0	1	1	8

== Awards and achievements ==
- WHL Prairie Division Second All-Star Team (1957)
- AHL Second All-Star Team (1966)
- AHL First All-Star Team (1970, 1972, and 1976)
- Eddie Shore Award (AHL) Outstanding Defenceman (1970, 1972, and 1976)
- Played in NHL All-Star Game (1967)
- American Hockey League [AHL] Calder Cup Champions with Springfield Indians (1960 & 1961) and Halifax Voyageurs (1972 and 1976)
- Inducted into the American Hockey League Hall Of Fame (2008)
