= 1967–68 Montreal Canadiens season =

NHL hockey team season (won Stanley Cup)

1967–68 Montreal Canadiens
- Stanley Cup champions
- East Division champions
- Division: 1st East
- 1967–68 record: 42–22–10
- Home record: 26–5–6
- Road record: 16–17–4
- Goals for: 236
- Goals against: 167

Team information
- General manager: Sam Pollock
- Coach: Toe Blake
- Captain: Jean Beliveau
- Alternate captains: Henri Richard; John Ferguson
- Arena: Montreal Forum

Team leaders
- Goals: Jean Beliveau (31)
- Assists: Bobby Rousseau (46)
- Points: Jean Beliveau (68)
- Penalty minutes: John Ferguson (117)
- Wins: Rogie Vachon (23)
- Goals against average: Gump Worsley (1.98)

The 1967–68 Montreal Canadiens season was the club's 59th season of play. The Canadiens won their 15th Stanley Cup in club history.

== Offseason ==
=== Expansion draft ===
The 1967 NHL expansion draft was held on June 6, 1967, in the ballroom of the Queen Elizabeth Hotel in Montreal. The Canadiens lost 18 players in the NHL Expansion Draft. General manager Sam Pollock helped Clarence Campbell draw up the rules for the draft. The most notable players lost were Charlie Hodge, Jean-Guy Talbot, Dave Balon and Jim Roberts.

== Regular season ==
On March 3, 1968, Jean Beliveau joined Gordie Howe as the only players to have 1000 career points.

=== Final standings ===
East Division
		GP	W	L	T	GF	GA	DIFF	Pts
1	Montreal Canadiens	74	42	22	10	236	167	+69	94
2	New York Rangers	74	39	23	12	226	183	+43	90
3	Boston Bruins	74	37	27	10	259	216	+43	84
4	Chicago Black Hawks	74	32	26	16	212	222	−10	80
5	Toronto Maple Leafs	74	33	31	10	209	176	+33	76
6	Detroit Red Wings	74	27	35	12	245	257	−12	66

=== Record vs. opponents ===
==== Vs. East Division ====
1967–68 NHL records
Team	BOS	CHI	DET	MTL	NYR	TOR	Total
Boston	—	5–3–2	5–3–2	5–5	6–2–2	2–5–3	23–18–9
Chicago	3–5–2	—	4–3–3	2–6–2	3–4–3	5–4–1	17–22–11
Detroit	3–5–2	3–4–3	—	3–6–1	3–5–2	1–8–1	13–28–9
Montreal	5–5	6–2–2	6–3–1	—	4–4–2	5–3–2	26–17–7
New York	2–6–2	4–3–3	5–3–2	4–4–2	—	7–3	22–19–9
Toronto	5–2–3	4–5–1	8–1–1	3–5–2	3–7	—	23–20–7

==== Vs. West Division ====
1967–68 NHL records
Team	LAK	MIN	OAK	PHI	PIT	STL	Total
Boston	3–1	2–2	2–2	3–1	2–2	2–1–1	14–9–1
Chicago	2–1–1	3–1	3–0–1	3–1	2–1–1	2–0–2	15–4–5
Detroit	1–2–1	2–2	3–0–1	3–1	3–1	2–1–1	14–7–3
Montreal	2–2	2–1–1	3–1	2–1–1	4–0	3–0–1	16–5–3
New York	2–2	2–0–2	4–0	3–1	3–0–1	3–1	17–4–3
Toronto	2–2	2–1–1	3–1	1–3	1–2–1	1–2–1	10–11–3

== Schedule and results ==
1967–68 regular season
October

Game	Result	Date	Score	Opponent	Record
1	W	October 11, 1967	2–1	@ Pittsburgh Penguins (1967–68)	1–0–0
2	W	October 14, 1967	6–2	Detroit Red Wings (1967–68)	2–0–0
3	L	October 15, 1967	2–6	@ Boston Bruins (1967–68)	2–1–0
4	T	October 18, 1967	2–2	@ New York Rangers (1967–68)	2–1–1
5	W	October 19, 1967	1–0	Toronto Maple Leafs (1967–68)	3–1–1
6	W	October 21, 1967	4–2	Boston Bruins (1967–68)	4–1–1
7	T	October 26, 1967	1–1	New York Rangers (1967–68)	4–1–2
8	W	October 28, 1967	4–1	St. Louis Blues (1967–68)	5–1–2

November

Game	Result	Date	Score	Opponent	Record
9	L	November 1, 1967	0–5	@ Toronto Maple Leafs (1967–68)	5–2–2
10	L	November 4, 1967	1–4	Philadelphia Flyers (1967–68)	5–3–2
11	T	November 5, 1967	1–1	@ Philadelphia Flyers (1967–68)	5–3–3
12	L	November 8, 1967	2–3	@ Chicago Black Hawks (1967–68)	5–4–3
13	T	November 11, 1967	3–3	Chicago Black Hawks (1967–68)	5–4–4
14	L	November 12, 1967	1–3	@ Detroit Red Wings (1967–68)	5–5–4
15	W	November 15, 1967	5–1	@ Minnesota North Stars (1967–68)	6–5–4
16	L	November 18, 1967	1–2	@ California Seals (1967–68)	6–6–4
17	L	November 19, 1967	2–4	@ Los Angeles Kings (1967–68)	6–7–4
18	W	November 22, 1967	3–1	@ St. Louis Blues (1967–68)	7–7–4
19	W	November 23, 1967	7–0	@ Chicago Black Hawks (1967–68)	8–7–4
20	L	November 25, 1967	1–3	Boston Bruins (1967–68)	8–8–4
21	L	November 29, 1967	1–2	@ Toronto Maple Leafs (1967–68)	8–9–4
22	T	November 30, 1967	1–1	Minnesota North Stars (1967–68)	8–9–5

December

Game	Result	Date	Score	Opponent	Record
23	L	December 2, 1967	2–3	Los Angeles Kings (1967–68)	8–10–5
24	L	December 3, 1967	3–5	@ Boston Bruins (1967–68)	8–11–5
25	T	December 7, 1967	2–2	Detroit Red Wings (1967–68)	8–11–6
26	T	December 9, 1967	2–2	Chicago Black Hawks (1967–68)	8–11–7
27	L	December 10, 1967	2–3	@ New York Rangers (1967–68)	8–12–7
28	W	December 13, 1967	6–2	@ Boston Bruins (1967–68)	9–12–7
29	W	December 16, 1967	4–3	Detroit Red Wings (1967–68)	10–12–7
30	L	December 17, 1967	6–8	@ Detroit Red Wings (1967–68)	10–13–7
31	W	December 20, 1967	5–0	Toronto Maple Leafs (1967–68)	11–13–7
32	W	December 23, 1967	4–2	Oakland Seals (1967–68)	12–13–7
33	L	December 25, 1967	1–3	@ Chicago Black Hawks (1967–68)	12–14–7
34	T	December 27, 1967	2–2	@ Toronto Maple Leafs (1967–68)	12–14–8
35	W	December 28, 1967	6–2	Minnesota North Stars (1967–68)	13–14–8
36	W	December 30, 1967	2–0	Oakland Seals (1967–68)	14–14–8

January

Game	Result	Date	Score	Opponent	Record
37	T	January 3, 1968	1–1	Toronto Maple Leafs (1967–68)	14–14–9
38	W	January 6, 1968	5–2	New York Rangers (1967–68)	15–14–9
39	W	January 7, 1968	4–3	@ Detroit Red Wings (1967–68)	16–14–9
40	W	January 10, 1968	4–3	@ Pittsburgh Penguins (1967–68)	17–14–9
41	W	January 11, 1968	4–2	@ Philadelphia Flyers (1967–68)	18–14–9
42	W	January 13, 1968	5–1	Boston Bruins (1967–68)	19–14–9
43	W	January 17, 1968	6–1	Detroit Red Wings (1967–68)	20–14–9
44	W	January 20, 1968	3–1	Chicago Black Hawks (1967–68)	21–14–9
45	W	January 25, 1968	2–0	@ Boston Bruins (1967–68)	22–14–9
46	W	January 27, 1968	5–2	Boston Bruins (1967–68)	23–14–9
47	W	January 30, 1968	3–0	Toronto Maple Leafs (1967–68)	24–14–9

February

Game	Result	Date	Score	Opponent	Record
48	W	February 1, 1968	5–2	New York Rangers (1967–68)	25–14–9
49	W	February 3, 1968	5–1	Los Angeles Kings (1967–68)	26–14–9
50	L	February 4, 1968	0–3	@ New York Rangers (1967–68)	26–15–9
51	W	February 7, 1968	4–1	Philadelphia Flyers (1967–68)	27–15–9
52	W	February 10, 1968	6–4	Chicago Black Hawks (1967–68)	28–15–9
53	W	February 11, 1968	6–0	@ Chicago Black Hawks (1967–68)	29–15–9
54	W	February 14, 1968	4–2	@ Toronto Maple Leafs (1967–68)	30–15–9
55	W	February 15, 1968	2–0	@ Detroit Red Wings (1967–68)	31–15–9
56	W	February 17, 1968	4–3	Pittsburgh Penguins (1967–68)	32–15–9
57	W	February 21, 1968	7–2	@ New York Rangers (1967–68)	33–15–9
58	W	February 22, 1968	2–1	St. Louis Blues (1967–68)	34–15–9
59	L	February 24, 1968	1–6	New York Rangers (1967–68)	34–16–9
60	T	February 28, 1968	3–3	@ St. Louis Blues (1967–68)	34–16–10

March

Game	Result	Date	Score	Opponent	Record
61	L	March 2, 1968	2–3	@ Minnesota North Stars (1967–68)	34–17–10
62	L	March 3, 1968	2–5	@ Detroit Red Wings (1967–68)	34–18–10
63	W	March 5, 1968	6–2	@ Los Angeles Kings (1967–68)	35–18–10
64	W	March 6, 1968	2–0	@ Oakland Seals (1967–68)	36–18–10
65	W	March 9, 1968	5–0	Chicago Black Hawks (1967–68)	37–18–10
66	W	March 14, 1968	3–1	New York Rangers (1967–68)	38–18–10
67	W	March 16, 1968	6–4	Pittsburgh Penguins (1967–68)	39–18–10
68	L	March 17, 1968	1–3	@ Boston Bruins (1967–68)	39–19–10
69	W	March 20, 1968	3–2	Toronto Maple Leafs (1967–68)	40–19–10
70	W	March 23, 1968	7–4	Detroit Red Wings (1967–68)	41–19–10
71	W	March 24, 1968	7–2	@ Chicago Black Hawks (1967–68)	42–19–10
72	L	March 27, 1968	0–6	@ Toronto Maple Leafs (1967–68)	42–20–10
73	L	March 30, 1968	1–2	Boston Bruins (1967–68)	42–21–10
74	L	March 31, 1968	2–4	@ New York Rangers (1967–68)	42–22–10

Legend: Win (2 points) Loss (0 points) Tie (1 point)

== Playoffs ==
=== Stanley Cup finals ===
This was the first Stanley Cup after the 1967 expansion. Montreal defeated Boston and Chicago to advance to the finals as the East Division champion. St. Louis would defeat Philadelphia and Minnesota to advance to the finals as the West Division champion.

Date	Visitors	Score	Home	Score	Notes
May 5	Montreal	3	St. Louis	2	OT
May 7	Montreal	1	St. Louis	0	
May 9	St. Louis	3	Montreal	4	OT
May 11	St. Louis	2	Montreal	3	

Montreal wins the series 4–0.

== Player statistics ==
=== Regular season ===
==== Scoring ====
Player	Pos	GP	G	A	Pts	PIM	PPG	SHG	GWG
Jean Beliveau	C	59	31	37	68	28	9	0	3
Bobby Rousseau	RW	74	19	46	65	47	7	1	5
Yvan Cournoyer	RW	64	28	32	60	23	7	1	4
Gilles Tremblay	LW	71	23	28	51	8	7	1	2
Dick Duff	LW	66	25	21	46	21	6	0	8
Ralph Backstrom	C	70	20	25	45	14	3	0	5
Claude Provost	RW	73	14	30	44	26	2	3	3
Jacques Lemaire	C	69	22	20	42	16	3	1	3
John Ferguson	LW	61	15	18	33	117	0	0	3
J. C. Tremblay	D	73	4	26	30	18	1	0	1
Henri Richard	C	54	9	19	28	16	2	0	3
Jacques Laperriere	D	72	4	21	25	84	1	0	0
Ted Harris	D	67	5	16	21	78	0	0	1
Serge Savard	D	67	2	13	15	34	1	0	0
Mickey Redmond	RW	41	6	5	11	4	1	0	0
Terry Harper	D	57	3	8	11	66	0	0	1
Claude Larose	RW	42	2	9	11	28	0	0	0
Danny Grant	RW	22	3	4	7	10	0	0	0
Carol Vadnais	D	31	1	1	2	31	0	0	0
Bryan Watson	D	12	0	1	1	9	0	0	0
Garry Monahan	LW	11	0	0	0	8	0	0	0
Rogie Vachon	G	39	0	0	0	2	0	0	0
Gump Worsley	G	40	0	0	0	10	0	0	0

==== Goaltending ====
Player	MIN	GP	W	L	T	GA	GAA	SO
Rogie Vachon	2227	39	23	13	2	92	2.48	4
Gump Worsley	2213	40	19	9	8	73	1.98	6
Team:	4440	74	42	22	10	165	2.23	10

=== Playoffs ===
==== Scoring ====
Player	Pos	GP	G	A	Pts	PIM	PPG	SHG	GWG
Yvan Cournoyer	RW	13	6	8	14	4	3	0	1
Jacques Lemaire	C	13	7	6	13	6	2	0	2
Jean Beliveau	C	10	7	4	11	6	3	0	1
Claude Provost	RW	13	2	8	10	10	1	0	1
J. C. Tremblay	D	13	3	6	9	2	0	1	1
Henri Richard	C	13	4	4	8	4	1	0	0
John Ferguson	LW	13	3	5	8	25	0	0	1
Ralph Backstrom	C	13	4	3	7	4	0	0	2
Dick Duff	LW	13	3	4	7	4	0	0	1
Bobby Rousseau	RW	13	2	4	6	8	0	0	1
Gilles Tremblay	LW	9	1	5	6	2	0	0	0
Claude Larose	RW	12	3	2	5	8	0	0	0
Jacques Laperriere	D	13	1	3	4	20	0	0	0
Ted Harris	D	13	0	4	4	22	0	0	0
Danny Grant	RW	10	0	3	3	5	0	0	0
Serge Savard	D	6	2	0	2	0	0	2	1
Terry Harper	D	13	0	1	1	8	0	0	0
Mickey Redmond	RW	2	0	0	0	0	0	0	0
Rogie Vachon	G	2	0	0	0	0	0	0	0
Carol Vadnais	D	1	0	0	0	0	0	0	0
Gump Worsley	G	12	0	0	0	10	0	0	0

==== Goaltending ====
Player	MIN	GP	W	L	GA	GAA	SO
Gump Worsley	672	12	11	0	21	1.88	1
Rogie Vachon	113	2	1	1	4	2.12	0
Team:	785	13	12	1	25	1.91	1

Note:

Pos = Position;GP = Games played; G = Goals; A = Assists; Pts = Points; PIM = Penalty minutes; +/- = Plus/minus; PPG = Power-play goals; SHG = Short-handed goals; GWG = Game-winning goals
Pos = Position;GP = Games played; Min, TOI = Minutes played; W = Wins; L = Losses; T,T/OT = Ties; OTL = Overtime losses; GA = Goals-against; GAA = Goals-against average; SO = Shutouts; SA = Shots against; SV = Shots saved;SV% = Save percentage;

== Awards and records ==
- Prince of Wales Trophy.
- Jean Beliveau, runner-up, Hart Trophy.
- Claude Provost, Bill Masterton Memorial Trophy.
- J. C. Tremblay, defence, NHL Second Team All-Star.
- J. C. Tremblay, runner-up, Norris Trophy.
- Rogie Vachon and Gump Worsley, Vezina Trophy.
- Gump Worsley, goaltender, NHL First Team All-Star.

== Draft picks ==
Montreal's draft picks at the 1967 NHL amateur draft held at the Queen Elizabeth Hotel in Montreal.

Round	#	Player	Nationality	College/Junior/Club team (League)
1	8	Elgin McCann	Canada	Weyburn Red Wings (WCJHL)

== See also ==
- 1967–68 NHL season
- List of Stanley Cup champions
