= Ron Boehm =

Canadian ice hockey player

- Born: August 14, 1943; Allan, Saskatchewan, Canada
- Died: December 8, 2017 (aged 74); Port Alberni, British Columbia, Canada
- Height: 5 ft 8 in (173 cm)
- Weight: 160 lb (73 kg; 11 st 6 lb)
- Position: Left wing
- Shot: Left
- Played for: Oakland Seals
- Playing career: 1964–1975

Ronald John Boehm (August 14, 1943 – December 8, 2017) was a Canadian professional ice hockey winger. His playing career, which lasted from 1964 to 1975, was mainly spent in various minor leagues, though he also played 16 games in the National Hockey League for the Oakland Seals during the 1967–68 season. He died on December 8, 2017.

== Career statistics ==
=== Regular season and playoffs ===
			Regular season					Playoffs
Season	Team	League	GP	G	A	Pts	PIM	GP	G	A	Pts	PIM
1962–63	Estevan Bruins	SJHL	54	15	31	45	42	11	2	5	7	4
1963–64	Estevan Bruins	SJHL	62	36	57	93	80	11	7	11	18	18
1964–65	Minneapolis Bruins	CHL	49	12	19	31	42	4	0	1	1	2
1965–66	Minnesota Rangers	CHL	70	8	20	28	37	7	0	5	5	4
1966–67	Vancouver Canucks	WHL	71	18	24	42	49	8	2	0	2	2
1967–68	Oakland Seals	NHL	16	2	1	3	10	—	—	—	—	—
1967–68	Vancouver Canucks	WHL	43	5	11	16	34	—	—	—	—	—
1968–69	Omaha Knights	CHL	67	12	16	28	41	7	3	1	4	7
1969–70	Omaha Knights	CHL	65	18	25	43	55	7	1	4	5	2
1970–71	Seattle Totems	WHL	72	10	26	36	39	—	—	—	—	—
1971–72	Boston Braves	AHL	74	18	37	55	61	9	2	3	5	4
1972–73	Boston Braves	AHL	28	6	16	22	28	4	1	0	1	4
1973–74	Boston Braves	AHL	76	18	23	41	60	–	–	–	–	–
1974–75	Broome Dusters	NAHL	39	9	23	32	61	15	3	4	7	4
NHL totals			16	2	1	3	10	—	—	—	—	—
