= Gilles Marotte =

Canadian ice hockey player

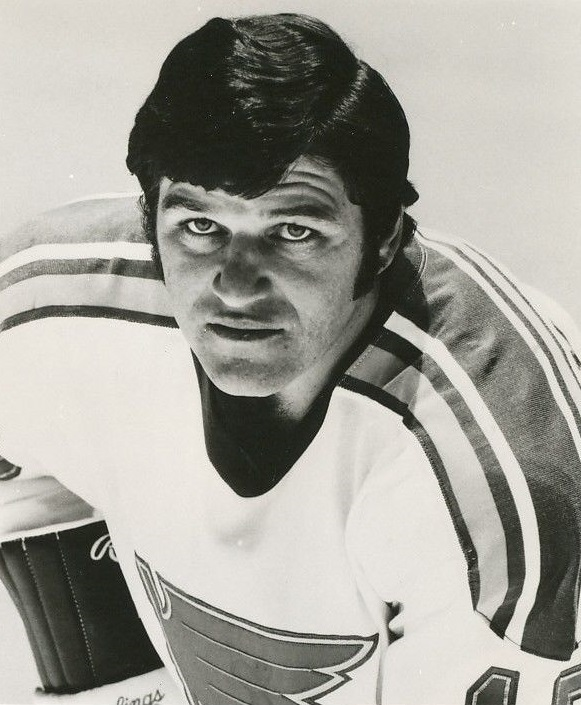
- Born: June 7, 1945 Montreal, Quebec, Canada
- Died: July 26, 2005 (aged 60) Verdun, Quebec, Canada
- Height: 5 ft 9 in (175 cm)
- Weight: 205 lb (93 kg; 14 st 9 lb)
- Position: Defence
- Shot: Left
- Played for: Boston Bruins; Chicago Black Hawks; Los Angeles Kings; New York Rangers; St. Louis Blues; Cincinnati Stingers; Indianapolis Racers
- Playing career: 1965–1978

Jean Gilles "Captain Crunch" Marotte (June 7, 1945 – July 26, 2005) was a Canadian defenceman in the National Hockey League with the Boston Bruins, Chicago Black Hawks, Los Angeles Kings, New York Rangers and St. Louis Blues.

Born in Montreal, Quebec, Marotte played junior hockey for the Victoriaville Bruins in Quebec before joining the Niagara Falls Flyers of the Ontario Hockey Association in 1963. He was a first-team all-star on the Flyers team that won the 1965 Memorial Cup. Both of his junior teams were affiliated with the Boston Bruins, and Marotte began his NHL career with the Bruins in 1965. In May 1967, he was part of one of the biggest trades in NHL history as one of three players sent to Chicago in the deal where Boston acquired Phil Esposito.

Marotte spent most of the next three seasons with the Black Hawks before being traded to the Los Angeles Kings in February 1970. While with the Kings in January 1971, Marotte broke rookie Darryl Sittler's wrist with a cross-check, giving him the most serious injury of his career. Marotte represented the Kings at the 1973 National Hockey League All-Star Game and scored a career-high 45 points that year. The next season, he was sent to the New York Rangers in a trade where the Kings acquired their future captain and coach, Mike Murphy. Marotte played in New York for three years. At the beginning of the 1976–77 season, Marotte was claimed on waivers by the St. Louis Blues, and spent time in the minor leagues for the only time in his career, playing for the Kansas City Blues in the Central Hockey League. The next season, Marotte jumped to the World Hockey Association to join the Cincinnati Stingers. He was traded mid-season to the Indianapolis Racers and finished his career there in 1978, retiring at the age of 33. Over his 13 seasons as a professional, Marotte appeared in 808 NHL games and 73 WHA games.

Marotte died of pancreatic cancer in 2005.

== Awards and achievements ==
- QJHL First All-Star Team (1963)
- OHA-Jr. First All-Star Team (1965)
- Played in NHL All-Star Game (1973)

== Career statistics ==
			Regular season					Playoffs
Season	Team	League	GP	G	A	Pts	PIM	GP	G	A	Pts	PIM
1961–62	Victoriaville Bruins	QJHL	43	15	28	43	—	10	1	3	4	6
1962–63	Victoriaville Bruins	QJHL	52	12	25	37	—	10	1	7	8	20
1963–64	Niagara Falls Flyers	OHA-Jr.	56	12	34	46	160	4	0	0	0	9
1963–64	Niagara Falls Flyers	M-Cup	—	—	—	—	—	13	4	9	13	30
1964–65	Niagara Falls Flyers	OHA-Jr.	52	12	25	37	122	11	2	0	2	50
1965–66	Boston Bruins	NHL	51	3	17	20	52	—	—	—	—	—
1966–67	Boston Bruins	NHL	67	7	8	15	112	—	—	—	—	—
1967–68	Chicago Black Hawks	NHL	73	0	21	21	122	11	3	1	4	14
1968–69	Chicago Black Hawks	NHL	68	5	29	34	120	—	—	—	—	—
1969–70	Chicago Black Hawks	NHL	51	5	13	18	52	—	—	—	—	—
1969–70	Los Angeles Kings	NHL	21	0	6	6	32	—	—	—	—	—
1970–71	Los Angeles Kings	NHL	78	6	27	33	96	—	—	—	—	—
1971–72	Los Angeles Kings	NHL	72	10	24	34	83	—	—	—	—	—
1972–73	Los Angeles Kings	NHL	78	6	39	45	70	—	—	—	—	—
1973–74	Los Angeles Kings	NHL	22	1	11	12	23	—	—	—	—	—
1973–74	New York Rangers	NHL	46	2	17	19	28	12	0	1	1	6
1974–75	New York Rangers	NHL	77	4	32	36	69	3	0	1	1	4
1975–76	New York Rangers	NHL	57	4	17	21	34	—	—	—	—	—
1976–77	St. Louis Blues	NHL	47	3	4	7	26	3	0	0	0	2
1976–77	Kansas City Blues	CHL	26	1	10	11	46	7	2	0	2	2
1977–78	Cincinnati Stingers	WHA	29	1	7	8	58	—	—	—	—	—
1977–78	Indianapolis Racers	WHA	44	2	13	15	18	—	—	—	—	—
NHL totals			808	56	265	321	919	29	3	3	6	26
WHA totals			73	3	20	23	76	—	—	—	—	—
