= 1967–68 Chicago Black Hawks season =

National Hockey League team season

1967–68 Chicago Black Hawks
- Division: 4th East
- 1967–68 record: 32–26–16
- Home record: 20–13–4
- Road record: 12–13–12
- Goals for: 212
- Goals against: 222

Team information
- General manager: Tommy Ivan
- Coach: Billy Reay
- Captain: Pierre Pilote
- Alternate captains: Bobby Hull; Stan Mikita
- Arena: Chicago Stadium

Team leaders
- Goals: Bobby Hull (44)
- Assists: Stan Mikita (47)
- Points: Stan Mikita (87)
- Penalty minutes: Gilles Marotte (122)
- Plus/minus: Bobby Hull (+14)
- Wins: Denis DeJordy (23)
- Goals against average: Denis DeJordy (2.71)

The 1967–68 Chicago Black Hawks season was the Hawks' 42nd season in the NHL. The team was coming off their best regular season in team history. In 1966–67, Chicago finished in first place for the first time in club history with a franchise record 94 points. The Black Hawks were then upset by the Toronto Maple Leafs in six games in the NHL semi-finals.

== Off-season ==
There were many changes in the NHL during the off-season. Most notably the league doubled in size, as six expansion teams began play in the 1967–68 season. The new teams added to the league were the California Seals (renamed to Oakland Seals in November), Los Angeles Kings, Minnesota North Stars, Philadelphia Flyers, Pittsburgh Penguins, and St. Louis Blues. The league placed all of the expansion teams in the new West Division, while the Original Six teams made up a newly created East Division. The NHL schedule also increased from 70 to 74 games.

The Black Hawks saw significant roster changes as they lost a number of players in the 1967 NHL expansion draft. The most noteworthy loss was goaltender Glenn Hall, left unprotected by the Hawks and drafted by the St. Louis Blues. Chicago also made a blockbuster trade, sending Phil Esposito, Ken Hodge, and Fred Stanfield to the Boston Bruins for Pit Martin, Gilles Marotte, and Jack Norris.

== Regular season ==
A six-game losing streak to start the season left the Black Hawks in last place. Chicago then rebounded, going 20–4–12 in their next 36 games. Poor play late in the season left the team with a 32–26–16 mark, good for 80 points and the fourth and final playoff berth from the East Division. It was the team's ninth consecutive postseason appearance.

Stan Mikita led the Hawks offense. His 40 goals and 47 assists (a league-best 87 points) won him both the Art Ross Trophy and Hart Memorial Trophy for the second straight year. Bobby Hull led the league in goals for the sixth time in his career, as he scored 44 times and earned 75 points. Kenny Wharram had another very solid season, earning 69 points, while Doug Mohns finished with 53 points. Pat Stapleton led the defense with 38 points, while Pierre Pilote finished just behind him with 37. Newly acquired Gilles Marotte led the team in penalty minutes with 122.

Denis DeJordy saw most of the action in goal. Playing in 50 games, DeJordy recorded a career high 23 wins, along with a team best 2.71 GAA and four shutouts.

=== Season standings ===
East Division
		GP	W	L	T	GF	GA	DIFF	Pts
1	Montreal Canadiens	74	42	22	10	236	167	+69	94
2	New York Rangers	74	39	23	12	226	183	+43	90
3	Boston Bruins	74	37	27	10	259	216	+43	84
4	Chicago Black Hawks	74	32	26	16	212	222	−10	80
5	Toronto Maple Leafs	74	33	31	10	209	176	+33	76
6	Detroit Red Wings	74	27	35	12	245	257	−12	66

=== Record vs. opponents ===
==== Vs. East Division ====
1967–68 NHL records
Team	BOS	CHI	DET	MTL	NYR	TOR	Total
Boston	—	5–3–2	5–3–2	5–5	6–2–2	2–5–3	23–18–9
Chicago	3–5–2	—	4–3–3	2–6–2	3–4–3	5–4–1	17–22–11
Detroit	3–5–2	3–4–3	—	3–6–1	3–5–2	1–8–1	13–28–9
Montreal	5–5	6–2–2	6–3–1	—	4–4–2	5–3–2	26–17–7
New York	2–6–2	4–3–3	5–3–2	4–4–2	—	7–3	22–19–9
Toronto	5–2–3	4–5–1	8–1–1	3–5–2	3–7	—	23–20–7

==== Vs. West Division ====
1967–68 NHL records
Team	LAK	MIN	OAK	PHI	PIT	STL	Total
Boston	3–1	2–2	2–2	3–1	2–2	2–1–1	14–9–1
Chicago	2–1–1	3–1	3–0–1	3–1	2–1–1	2–0–2	15–4–5
Detroit	1–2–1	2–2	3–0–1	3–1	3–1	2–1–1	14–7–3
Montreal	2–2	2–1–1	3–1	2–1–1	4–0	3–0–1	16–5–3
New York	2–2	2–0–2	4–0	3–1	3–0–1	3–1	17–4–3
Toronto	2–2	2–1–1	3–1	1–3	1–2–1	1–2–1	10–11–3

== Playoffs ==
The Hawks would open the playoffs against the New York Rangers in the East Division semifinals. The Rangers finished the season with 90 points, which was 10 more than Chicago. The series opened up with two games at Madison Square Garden in New York, and the Rangers took control of the series, winning both games for a 2–0 series lead. The series moved to Chicago Stadium for the next two games, and the Hawks responded on their home ice, winning both games to even the series up. The fifth game was played in New York, however, the Black Hawks held off the Rangers, winning the game 2–1, and took a 3–2 series lead. Chicago would wrap up the series in the sixth game at home, easily defeating the Rangers 4–1, and advance to the East Division finals.

Chicago would face the Montreal Canadiens, with the winner advancing to the Stanley Cup Final. The Canadiens had the best record in the NHL, as they earned 94 points. Montreal swept the Boston Bruins in their first playoff round. The series began at the Montreal Forum, and the Canadiens quickly took a 2–0 series lead, as they dominated the Hawks in both games, winning 9–2 and 4–1. The series moved to Chicago for the next two games, however, in the third game of the series, Montreal took a 3–0 series lead, doubling the Hawks 4–2 to put Chicago on the brink of elimination. The Black Hawks staved off elimination in the fourth game, narrowly defeating Montreal 2–1, however, in the fifth game, played in Montreal, the Canadiens ended the series with an overtime winning goal, and advance to the Stanley Cup Final.

== Schedule and results ==
=== Regular season ===
1967–68 regular season
October

Game	Date	Visitor	Score	Home	Record	Points
1	October 11	New York Rangers	6–3	Chicago Black Hawks	0–1–0	0
2	October 14	Chicago Black Hawks	1–5	Toronto Maple Leafs	0–2–0	0
3	October 15	Toronto Maple Leafs	5–3	Chicago Black Hawks	0–3–0	0
4	October 18	Boston Bruins	7–1	Chicago Black Hawks	0–4–0	0
5	October 21	Chicago Black Hawks	2–4	Pittsburgh Penguins	0–5–0	0
6	October 22	Los Angeles Kings	5–3	Chicago Black Hawks	0–6–0	0
7	October 25	Chicago Black Hawks	2–2	New York Rangers	0–6–1	1
8	October 28	Chicago Black Hawks	4–2	Minnesota North Stars	1–6–1	3
9	October 29	Chicago Black Hawks	1–5	Detroit Red Wings	1–7–1	3

November

Game	Date	Visitor	Score	Home	Record	Points
10	November 2	Chicago Black Hawks	3–1	Los Angeles Kings	2–7–1	5
11	November 5	Chicago Black Hawks	2–2	California Seals	2–7–2	6
12	November 8	Montreal Canadiens	2–3	Chicago Black Hawks	3–7–2	8
13	November 11	Chicago Black Hawks	3–3	Montreal Canadiens	3–7–3	9
14	November 12	St. Louis Blues	2–5	Chicago Black Hawks	4–7–3	11
15	November 15	Chicago Black Hawks	4–1	St. Louis Blues	5–7–3	13
16	November 18	Chicago Black Hawks	2–2	Toronto Maple Leafs	5–7–4	14
17	November 19	Detroit Red Wings	2–2	Chicago Black Hawks	5–7–5	15
18	November 22	Chicago Black Hawks	7–1	New York Rangers	6–7–5	17
19	November 23	Montreal Canadiens	7–0	Chicago Black Hawks	6–8–5	17
20	November 25	Chicago Black Hawks	4–1	Minnesota North Stars	7–8–5	19
21	November 26	Minnesota North Stars	1–2	Chicago Black Hawks	8–8–5	21
22	November 29	Philadelphia Flyers	1–3	Chicago Black Hawks	9–8–5	23

December

Game	Date	Visitor	Score	Home	Record	Points
23	December 2	Chicago Black Hawks	2–2	Boston Bruins	9–8–6	24
24	December 3	Minnesota North Stars	4–3	Chicago Black Hawks	9–9–6	24
25	December 6	Pittsburgh Penguins	2–7	Chicago Black Hawks	10–9–6	26
26	December 9	Chicago Black Hawks	2–2	Montreal Canadiens	10–9–7	27
27	December 10	Chicago Black Hawks	3–0	Philadelphia Flyers	11–9–7	29
28	December 13	New York Rangers	2–5	Chicago Black Hawks	12–9–7	31
29	December 14	Chicago Black Hawks	3–1	Detroit Red Wings	13–9–7	33
30	December 16	Chicago Black Hawks	1–1	Pittsburgh Penguins	13–9–8	34
31	December 17	Toronto Maple Leafs	0–2	Chicago Black Hawks	14–9–8	36
32	December 20	Boston Bruins	3–6	Chicago Black Hawks	15–9–8	38
33	December 23	Philadelphia Flyers	2–3	Chicago Black Hawks	16–9–8	40
34	December 25	Montreal Canadiens	1–3	Chicago Black Hawks	17–9–8	42
35	December 27	Chicago Black Hawks	2–7	Boston Bruins	17–10–8	42
36	December 30	Chicago Black Hawks	3–3	New York Rangers	17–10–9	43
37	December 31	Oakland Seals	0–3	Chicago Black Hawks	18–10–9	45

January

Game	Date	Visitor	Score	Home	Record	Points
38	January 6	Detroit Red Wings	2–6	Chicago Black Hawks	19–10–9	47
39	January 7	Boston Bruins	2–4	Chicago Black Hawks	20–10–9	49
40	January 10	New York Rangers	3–3	Chicago Black Hawks	20–10–10	50
41	January 13	Chicago Black Hawks	4–4	Detroit Red Wings	20–10–11	51
42	January 14	St. Louis Blues	2–2	Chicago Black Hawks	20–10–12	52
43	January 17	New York Rangers	4–2	Chicago Black Hawks	20–11–12	52
44	January 20	Chicago Black Hawks	1–3	Montreal Canadiens	20–12–12	52
45	January 21	Chicago Black Hawks	0–6	Boston Bruins	20–13–12	52
46	January 24	Detroit Red Wings	4–2	Chicago Black Hawks	20–14–12	52
47	January 27	Chicago Black Hawks	4–1	Toronto Maple Leafs	21–14–12	54
48	January 28	Toronto Maple Leafs	3–1	Chicago Black Hawks	21–15–12	54
49	January 31	Chicago Black Hawks	3–2	New York Rangers	22–15–12	56

February

Game	Date	Visitor	Score	Home	Record	Points
50	February 1	Chicago Black Hawks	4–4	Boston Bruins	22–15–13	57
51	February 3	Chicago Black Hawks	3–5	Philadelphia Flyers	22–16–13	57
52	February 4	Los Angeles Kings	3–5	Chicago Black Hawks	23–16–13	59
53	February 7	Toronto Maple Leafs	2–3	Chicago Black Hawks	24–16–13	61
54	February 10	Chicago Black Hawks	4–6	Montreal Canadiens	24–17–13	61
55	February 11	Montreal Canadiens	6–0	Chicago Black Hawks	24–18–13	61
56	February 14	Boston Bruins	1–3	Chicago Black Hawks	25–18–13	63
57	February 17	Chicago Black Hawks	7–4	Detroit Red Wings	26–18–13	65
58	February 18	Detroit Red Wings	1–7	Chicago Black Hawks	27–18–13	67
59	February 21	Chicago Black Hawks	1–0	Oakland Seals	28–18–13	69
60	February 24	Chicago Black Hawks	3–3	Los Angeles Kings	28–18–14	70
61	February 28	Chicago Black Hawks	1–0	Toronto Maple Leafs	29–18–14	72

March

Game	Date	Visitor	Score	Home	Record	Points
62	March 2	Chicago Black Hawks	3–3	St. Louis Blues	29–18–15	73
63	March 3	Chicago Black Hawks	0–4	New York Rangers	29–19–15	73
64	March 6	Boston Bruins	5–3	Chicago Black Hawks	29–20–15	73
65	March 9	Chicago Black Hawks	0–5	Montreal Canadiens	29–21–15	73
66	March 10	Toronto Maple Leafs	0–4	Chicago Black Hawks	30–21–15	75
67	March 13	Pittsburgh Penguins	3–4	Chicago Black Hawks	31–21–15	77
68	March 17	Oakland Seals	1–4	Chicago Black Hawks	32–21–15	79
69	March 20	New York Rangers	5–3	Chicago Black Hawks	32–22–15	79
70	March 21	Chicago Black Hawks	0–8	Boston Bruins	32–23–15	79
71	March 24	Montreal Canadiens	7–2	Chicago Black Hawks	32–24–15	79
72	March 28	Chicago Black Hawks	1–3	Detroit Red Wings	32–25–15	79
73	March 30	Chicago Black Hawks	0–3	Toronto Maple Leafs	32–26–15	79
74	March 31	Detroit Red Wings	5–5	Chicago Black Hawks	32–26–16	80

Legend: Win (2 points) Loss (0 points) Tie (1 point)

=== Playoffs ===
1968 Stanley Cup playoffs
Quarterfinals vs. (2) New York Rangers – Black Hawks win 4–2

Game	Date	Visitor	Score	Home	Series
1	April 4	Chicago Black Hawks	1–3	New York Rangers	0–1
2	April 9	Chicago Black Hawks	1–2	New York Rangers	0–2
3	April 11	New York Rangers	4–7	Chicago Black Hawks	1–2
4	April 13	New York Rangers	1–3	Chicago Black Hawks	2–2
5	April 14	Chicago Black Hawks	2–1	New York Rangers	3–2
6	April 16	New York Rangers	1–4	Chicago Black Hawks	4–2

Semifinals vs. (1) Montreal Canadiens – Canadiens win 4–1

Game	Date	Visitor	Score	Home	Series
1	April 18	Chicago Black Hawks	2–9	Montreal Canadiens	0–1
2	April 20	Chicago Black Hawks	1–4	Montreal Canadiens	0–2
3	April 23	Montreal Canadiens	4–2	Chicago Black Hawks	0–3
4	April 25	Montreal Canadiens	1–2	Chicago Black Hawks	1–3
5	April 28	Chicago Black Hawks	3–4	Montreal Canadiens	1–4

Legend: Win Loss

== Player stats ==
=== Scoring leaders ===
Player	GP	G	A	Pts	PIM
Stan Mikita	72	40	47	87	14
Bobby Hull	71	44	31	75	52
Kenny Wharram	74	27	42	69	18
Doug Mohns	65	24	29	53	53
Pat Stapleton	67	4	34	38	34

=== Goaltending ===
Player	GP	TOI	W	L	T	GA	SO	GAA
Denis DeJordy	50	2838	23	15	11	128	4	2.71
Dave Dryden	27	1268	7	8	5	69	1	3.26
Jack Norris	7	334	2	3	0	22	1	3.95

== Playoff stats ==
=== Scoring leaders ===
Player	GP	G	A	Pts	PIM
Stan Mikita	11	5	7	12	6
Bobby Hull	11	4	6	10	15
Pit Martin	11	3	6	9	2
Chico Maki	11	2	5	7	4
Doug Mohns	11	1	5	6	12

=== Goaltending ===
Player	GP	TOI	W	L	GA	SO	GAA
Denis DeJordy	11	662	5	6	34	0	3.08

== Draft picks ==
Chicago's draft picks at the 1967 NHL amateur draft held at the Queen Elizabeth Hotel in Montreal.

Round	#	Player	Nationality	College/Junior/Club team (League)
1	7	Bob Tombari	Canada	Sault Ste. Marie Greyhounds (NOHA)

== Sources ==
- Hockey-Reference
- Rauzulu's Street
- HockeyDB
- National Hockey League Guide & Record Book 2007
