= 1967–68 New York Rangers season =

NHL hockey team season

1967–68 New York Rangers
- Division: 2nd East
- 1967–68 record: 39–23–12
- Home record: 22–8–7
- Road record: 17–15–5
- Goals for: 226
- Goals against: 183

Team information
- General manager: Emile Francis
- Coach: Emile Francis
- Captain: Bob Nevin
- Alternate captains: Harry Howell; Don Marshall
- Arena: Madison Square Garden III; Madison Square Garden IV

Team leaders
- Goals: Jean Ratelle (32)
- Assists: Rod Gilbert (48)
- Points: Jean Ratelle (78)
- Penalty minutes: Reg Fleming (132)
- Wins: Eddie Giacomin (36)
- Goals against average: Gilles Villemure (2.40)

The 1967–68 New York Rangers season was the franchise's 42nd season.

The season was significant for its move from the third Madison Square Garden to the fourth. The Rangers played their last game in the old Garden on Sunday afternoon, February 11 (the day of the official opening of the fourth Garden) when they tied the Detroit Red Wings 3-3. The next Sunday, February 18, the Rangers played their first game at the new Garden, a 3–0 win against the expansion Philadelphia Flyers. In all the Rangers played fourteen of their forty home games at the new Garden, including three playoff games against the Chicago Black Hawks. The Rangers became the first Original Six team to leave their old arena for a modern arena; it would be another eleven years before another of the original six (the Detroit Red Wings) would move to a modern arena.

== Regular season ==
=== Final standings ===
East Division
		GP	W	L	T	GF	GA	DIFF	Pts
1	Montreal Canadiens	74	42	22	10	236	167	+69	94
2	New York Rangers	74	39	23	12	226	183	+43	90
3	Boston Bruins	74	37	27	10	259	216	+43	84
4	Chicago Black Hawks	74	32	26	16	212	222	−10	80
5	Toronto Maple Leafs	74	33	31	10	209	176	+33	76
6	Detroit Red Wings	74	27	35	12	245	257	−12	66

=== Record vs. opponents ===
==== Vs. East Division ====
1967–68 NHL records
Team	BOS	CHI	DET	MTL	NYR	TOR	Total
Boston	—	5–3–2	5–3–2	5–5	6–2–2	2–5–3	23–18–9
Chicago	3–5–2	—	4–3–3	2–6–2	3–4–3	5–4–1	17–22–11
Detroit	3–5–2	3–4–3	—	3–6–1	3–5–2	1–8–1	13–28–9
Montreal	5–5	6–2–2	6–3–1	—	4–4–2	5–3–2	26–17–7
New York	2–6–2	4–3–3	5–3–2	4–4–2	—	7–3	22–19–9
Toronto	5–2–3	4–5–1	8–1–1	3–5–2	3–7	—	23–20–7

==== Vs. West Division ====
1967–68 NHL records
Team	LAK	MIN	OAK	PHI	PIT	STL	Total
Boston	3–1	2–2	2–2	3–1	2–2	2–1–1	14–9–1
Chicago	2–1–1	3–1	3–0–1	3–1	2–1–1	2–0–2	15–4–5
Detroit	1–2–1	2–2	3–0–1	3–1	3–1	2–1–1	14–7–3
Montreal	2–2	2–1–1	3–1	2–1–1	4–0	3–0–1	16–5–3
New York	2–2	2–0–2	4–0	3–1	3–0–1	3–1	17–4–3
Toronto	2–2	2–1–1	3–1	1–3	1–2–1	1–2–1	10–11–3

== Schedule and results ==
1967–68 regular season
October: 5–1–3 (home: 2–0–2; road: 3–1–1)

Game	October	Opponent	Score	Record
1	11	@ Chicago Black Hawks	6–3	1–0–0
2	15	@ Detroit Red Wings	3–2	1–1–0
3	18	Montreal Canadiens	2–2	1–1–1
4	21	@ Toronto Maple Leafs	5–3	2–1–1
5	22	Pittsburgh Penguins	6–4	3–1–1
6	25	Chicago Black Hawks	2–2	3–1–2
7	26	@ Montreal Canadiens	1–1	3–1–3
8	29	Toronto Maple Leafs	3–2	4–1–3
9	31	@ Los Angeles Kings	6–1	5–1–3

November: 4–7–0 (home: 3–3–0; road: 1–4–0)

Game	November	Opponent	Score	Record
10	1	@ California Seals	2–0	6–1–3
11	4	@ Toronto Maple Leafs	4–2	6–2–3
12	8	Boston Bruins	6–3	6–3–3
13	12	California Seals	5–3	7–3–3
14	16	@ Philadelphia Flyers	3–2	7–4–3
15	18	@ Boston Bruins	3–1	7–5–3
16	19	Minnesota North Stars	5–2	8–5–3
17	22	Chicago Black Hawks	7–1	8–6–3
18	23	@ Boston Bruins	4–2	8–7–3
19	26	St. Louis Blues	1–0	9–7–3
20	29	Detroit Red Wings	3–1	9–8–3

December: 7–5–3 (home: 5–1–3; road: 2–4–0)

Game	December	Opponent	Score	Record
21	2	@ Pittsburgh Penguins	4–1	10–8–3
22	3	Los Angeles Kings	4–2	11–8–3
23	6	Detroit Red Wings	3–3	11–8–4
24	7	@ Boston Bruins	3–1	11–9–4
25	9	@ Detroit Red Wings	3–2	11–10–4
26	10	Montreal Canadiens	3–2	12–10–4
27	13	@ Chicago Black Hawks	5–2	12–11–4
28	16	@ Toronto Maple Leafs	4–2	12–12–4
29	17	St. Louis Blues	5–3	13–12–4
30	20	Detroit Red Wings	2–0	14–12–4
31	23	Boston Bruins	4–0	14–13–4
32	25	@ Philadelphia Flyers	3–1	15–13–4
33	27	Minnesota North Stars	3–3	15–13–5
34	30	Chicago Black Hawks	3–3	15–13–6
35	31	Toronto Maple Leafs	4–0	16–13–6

January: 6–4–2 (home: 3–1–1; road: 3–3–1)

Game	January	Opponent	Score	Record
36	3	Boston Bruins	5–5	16–13–7
37	6	@ Montreal Canadiens	5–2	16–14–7
38	7	Toronto Maple Leafs	6–2	17–14–7
39	10	@ Chicago Black Hawks	3–3	17–14–8
40	13	@ St. Louis Blues	3–1	18–14–8
41	17	@ Chicago Black Hawks	4–2	19–14–8
42	19	@ Los Angeles Kings	5–2	19–15–8
43	20	@ Oakland Seals	3–0	20–15–8
44	24	Boston Bruins	2–1	21–15–8
45	27	@ St. Louis Blues	4–3	21–16–8
46	28	Oakland Seals	4–2	22–16–8
47	31	Chicago Black Hawks	3–2	22–17–8

February: 8–2–3 (home: 3–1–1; road: 5–1–2)

Game	February	Opponent	Score	Record
48	1	@ Montreal Canadiens	5–2	22–18–8
49	3	@ Boston Bruins	3–3	22–18–9
50	4	Montreal Canadiens	3–0	23–18–9
51	8	@ Detroit Red Wings	3–2	24–18–9
52	10	@ Pittsburgh Penguins	2–2	24–18–10
53	11	Detroit Red Wings	3–3	24–18–11
54	15	@ Minnesota North Stars	6–2	25–18–11
55	17	@ Toronto Maple Leafs	3–2	26–18–11
56	18	Philadelphia Flyers	3–1	27–18–11
57	21	Montreal Canadiens	7–2	27–19–11
58	24	@ Montreal Canadiens	6–1	28–19–11
59	25	Toronto Maple Leafs	3–1	29–19–11
60	29	@ Detroit Red Wings	4–2	30–19–11

March: 9–4–1 (home: 6–2–0; road: 3–2–1)

Game	March	Opponent	Score	Record
61	2	Philadelphia Flyers	4–0	31–19–11
62	3	Chicago Black Hawks	4–0	32–19–11
63	6	Detroit Red Wings	6–1	33–19–11
64	9	@ Minnesota North Stars	1–1	33–19–12
65	10	Los Angeles Kings	4–3	33–20–12
66	13	Boston Bruins	2–1	33–21–12
67	14	@ Montreal Canadiens	3–1	33–22–12
68	17	Pittsburgh Penguins	3–0	34–22–12
69	20	@ Chicago Black Hawks	5–3	35–22–12
70	23	@ Toronto Maple Leafs	3–1	35–23–12
71	24	Toronto Maple Leafs	4–2	36–23–12
72	28	@ Boston Bruins	5–4	37–23–12
73	30	@ Detroit Red Wings	3–1	38–23–12
74	31	Montreal Canadiens	4–2	39–23–12

Legend: Win (2 points) Loss (0 points) Tie (1 point)

== Playoffs ==
1968 Stanley Cup playoffs
Quarterfinals vs. (E4) Chicago Black Hawks – Black Hawks win 4–2

Game	Date	Visitor	Score	Home	OT	Series
1	April 4	Chicago Black Hawks	1–3	New York Rangers		New York Rangers lead series 1–0
2	April 9	Chicago Black Hawks	1–2	New York Rangers		New York Rangers lead series 2–0
3	April 11	New York Rangers	4–7	Chicago Black Hawks		New York Rangers lead series 2–1
4	April 13	New York Rangers	1–3	Chicago Black Hawks		Series tied 2–2
5	April 14	Chicago Black Hawks	2–1	New York Rangers		Chicago leads series 3–2
6	April 16	New York Rangers	1–4	Chicago Black Hawks		Chicago wins series 4–2

Legend: Win Loss

== Player statistics ==
Skaters

Regular season
Player	GP	G	A	Pts	PIM
Jean Ratelle	74	32	46	78	18
Rod Gilbert	73	29	48	77	12
Phil Goyette	73	25	40	65	10
Bob Nevin	74	28	30	58	20
Donnie Marshall	70	19	30	49	2
Vic Hadfield	59	20	19	39	45
Orland Kurtenbach	73	15	20	35	82
Jim Neilson	67	6	29	35	60
Harry Howell	74	5	24	29	62
Arnie Brown	74	1	25	26	83
Reg Fleming	73	17	7	24	132
Bernie Geoffrion	59	5	16	21	11
Camille Henry	36	8	12	20	0
Rod Seiling	71	5	11	16	44
Ron Stewart^{†}	55	7	7	14	19
Larry Jeffrey	47	2	4	6	15
Wayne Hillman	62	0	5	5	46
Gordon Berenson^{‡}	19	2	1	3	2
Larry Mickey	4	0	2	2	0
Walt Tkaczuk	2	0	0	0	0
Al Hamilton	2	0	0	0	0
Ron Attwell^{†}	4	0	0	0	2

Playoffs
Player	GP	G	A	Pts	PIM
Rod Gilbert	6	5	0	5	4
Jean Ratelle	6	0	4	4	2
Vic Hadfield	6	1	2	3	6
Donnie Marshall	6	2	1	3	0
Bob Nevin	6	0	3	3	4
Ron Stewart	6	1	1	2	2
Rod Seiling	6	0	2	2	4
Reg Fleming	6	0	2	2	4
Jim Neilson	6	1	1	2	4
Bernie Geoffrion	1	0	1	1	0
Arnie Brown	6	0	1	1	8
Harry Howell	6	1	0	1	0
Orland Kurtenbach	6	1	0	1	26
Phil Goyette	6	0	1	1	4
Dennis Hextall	2	0	0	0	0
Wayne Hillman	2	0	0	0	0
Larry Jeffrey	3	0	0	0	0
Camille Henry	6	0	0	0	0

Goaltenders

Regular season
Player	GP	TOI	W	L	T	GA	GAA	SO
Ed Giacomin	66	3940	36	20	10	160	2.44	8
Don Simmons	5	300	2	1	2	13	2.60	0
Gilles Villemure	4	200	1	2	0	8	2.40	1

Playoffs
Player	GP	TOI	W	L	GA	GAA	SO
Ed Giacomin	6	360	2	4	18	3.00	0

^{†}Denotes player spent time with another team before joining Rangers. Stats reflect time with Rangers only.
^{‡}Traded mid-season. Stats reflect time with Rangers only.

Note:

Pos = Position;GP = Games played; G = Goals; A = Assists; Pts = Points; PIM = Penalty minutes; +/- = Plus/minus; PPG = Power-play goals; SHG = Short-handed goals; GWG = Game-winning goals
Pos = Position;GP = Games played; Min, TOI = Minutes played; W = Wins; L = Losses; T,T/OT = Ties; OTL = Overtime losses; GA = Goals-against; GAA = Goals-against average; SO = Shutouts; SA = Shots against; SV = Shots saved;SV% = Save percentage;

== Draft picks ==
New York's picks at the 1967 NHL amateur draft in Montreal, Canada.

Round	#	Player	Position	Nationality	College/Junior/Club team (League)
1	6	Bob Dickson	LW	Canada	Chatham (Junior B)
2	15	Brian Tosh	D	Canada	Smiths Falls Bears (CJAHL)

== See also ==
- 1967–68 NHL season
