= 1967–68 Minnesota North Stars season =

National Hockey League team season

1967–68 Minnesota North Stars
- Division: 4th West
- 1967–68 record: 27–32–15
- Home record: 17–12–8
- Road record: 10–20–7
- Goals for: 191
- Goals against: 226

Team information
- General manager: Wren Blair
- Coach: Wren Blair
- Captain: Bob Woytowich
- Alternate captains: Elmer Vasko; Dave Balon; Mike McMahon Jr.
- Arena: Met Center

Team leaders
- Goals: Wayne Connelly (35)
- Assists: André Boudrias (35)
- Points: Wayne Connelly (56)
- Penalty minutes: Dave Balon (84)
- Wins: Cesare Maniago (21)
- Goals against average: Cesare Maniago (2.77)

The 1967–68 Minnesota North Stars season was the team's inaugural season in the National Hockey League (NHL). They finished fourth in the West Division with a record of 27 wins, 32 losses, and 15 ties for 69 points. In the playoffs, they defeated the Los Angeles Kings in seven games in the Quarter-finals before losing to the St. Louis Blues in the Semi-finals, also in seven games.

== Offseason ==
On March 11, 1965, NHL President Clarence Campbell announced that the league would expand to twelve teams from six through the creation of a new six-team division for the 1967–68 season. In response to Campbell's announcement, a partnership of nine men, led by Walter Bush and John Driscoll, was formed to seek a franchise for the Twin Cities area of Minnesota. Their efforts were successful as the NHL awarded one of six expansion franchises to Minnesota on February 9, 1966. In addition to Minnesota, the five other franchises were California (Oakland), Los Angeles, Philadelphia, Pittsburgh and St. Louis. The "North Stars" name was announced on May 25, 1966, following a public contest. The name is derived from the state's motto "L'Étoile du Nord", which is a French phrase meaning "The Star of the North". Months after the naming of the team, ground was broken on October 3, 1966, for a new hockey arena in Bloomington, Minnesota. The home of the North Stars, the Metropolitan Sports Center (or Met Center for short), was built in 12 months at a cost of US$7 million. The arena was ready for play for the start of the 1967–68 NHL season, but portions of the arena's construction had not been completed. Spectator seats were in the process of being installed as fans arrived at the arena for the opening home game on October 21, 1967.

== Regular season ==
=== Bill Masterton ===
On January 13, 1968, four minutes into a game against the Seals at the Met Center, North Stars center Bill Masterton was checked by Oakland's Larry Cahan and Ron Harris and fell backwards onto the ice head-first. The force of the back of his head hitting the ice damaged the pons and caused severe hemorrhaging, as blood gushed from his mouth and nose. Masterton was taken to hospital where he died two days later, becoming the only player ever to die as a result of an on-ice injury.

=== Final standings ===
West Division
		GP	W	L	T	GF	GA	DIFF	Pts
1	Philadelphia Flyers	74	31	32	11	173	179	−6	73
2	Los Angeles Kings	74	31	33	10	200	224	−24	72
3	St. Louis Blues	74	27	31	16	177	191	−14	70
4	Minnesota North Stars	74	27	32	15	191	226	−35	69
5	Pittsburgh Penguins	74	27	34	13	195	216	−21	67
6	Oakland Seals	74	15	42	17	153	219	−66	47

=== Record vs. opponents ===
==== Vs. West Division ====
1967–68 NHL records
Team	LAK	MIN	OAK	PHI	PIT	STL	Total
Los Angeles	—	2–6–2	4–4–2	5–4–1	6–4	4–3–3	21–21–8
Minnesota	6–2–2	—	5–2–3	3–6–1	3–4–3	3–5–2	20–19–11
Oakland	4–4–2	2–5–3	—	4–3–3	1–5–4	0–7–3	11–24–15
Philadelphia	4–5–1	6–3–1	3–4–3	—	3–4–3	7–1–2	23–17–10
Pittsburgh	4–6	4–3–3	5–1–4	4–3–3	—	4–6	21–19–10
St. Louis	3–4–3	5–3–2	7–0–3	1–7–2	6–4	—	22–18–10

==== Vs. East Division ====
1967–68 NHL records
Team	BOS	CHI	DET	MTL	NYR	TOR	Total
Los Angeles	1–3	1–2–1	2–1–1	2–2	2–2	2–2	10–12–2
Minnesota	2–2	1–3	2–2	1–2–1	0–2–2	1–2–1	7–13–4
Oakland	2–2	0–3–1	0–3–1	1–3	0–4	1–3	4–18–2
Philadelphia	1–3	1–3	1–3	1–2–1	1–3	3–1	8–15–1
Pittsburgh	2–2	1–2–1	1–3	0–4	0–3–1	2–1–1	6–15–3
St. Louis	1–2–1	0–2–2	1–2–1	0–3–1	1–3	2–1–1	5–13–6

== Playoffs ==
The North Stars, having squeaked into the playoffs by two points (having the same number of wins as Pittsburgh but with two more ties) would play the #2 seed in the newly created Western Division side of the postseason bracket, since the expansion from six to twelve teams put all the new teams in the Western that would ensure one of them to play in the Stanley Cup. At any rate, Minnesota would play in five overtime games in their fourteen postseason matches, winning just two of them. The North Stars, facing the chance to go to the Stanley Cup, took the lead in Game 7 on Walt McKechnie's goal with 3:11 to play. However, the Blues followed it up 31 seconds later with a goal from Dickie Moore that would mean overtime. Cesare Maniago and Glenn Hall combined for 80 saves, but Ron Schock's "Midnight Goal" in double-overtime (it would be known as the "Midnight Goal" by numerous fans) to send the Blues to the Final.

In the first round of the Western Division playoffs, the North Stars defeated the Los Angeles Kings in seven games. The second round of the playoff series would be played against the St. Louis Blues and that series would go to seven games as well. The Blues would win the seventh game and advance to face the Montreal Canadiens in the 1968 Stanley Cup Finals.

== Schedule and results ==
1967–68 regular season
October

Game	Result	Date	Score	Opponent	Record
1	T	October 11, 1967	2–2	@ St. Louis Blues (1967–68)	0–0–1
2	L	October 14, 1967	0–6	@ California Seals (1967–68)	0–1–1
3	L	October 15, 1967	3–5	@ Los Angeles Kings (1967–68)	0–2–1
4	T	October 18, 1967	3–3	@ Pittsburgh Penguins (1967–68)	0–2–2
5	W	October 21, 1967	3–1	California Seals (1967–68)	1–2–2
6	W	October 25, 1967	3–2	St. Louis Blues (1967–68)	2–2–2
7	L	October 28, 1967	2–4	Chicago Black Hawks (1967–68)	2–3–2

November

Game	Result	Date	Score	Opponent	Record
8	L	November 1, 1967	1–4	Pittsburgh Penguins (1967–68)	2–4–2
9	W	November 2, 1967	3–1	@ Philadelphia Flyers (1967–68)	3–4–2
10	T	November 4, 1967	2–2	Los Angeles Kings (1967–68)	3–4–3
11	W	November 8, 1967	5–1	St. Louis Blues (1967–68)	4–4–3
12	W	November 11, 1967	2–1	Toronto Maple Leafs (1967–68)	5–4–3
13	L	November 15, 1967	1–5	Montreal Canadiens (1967–68)	5–5–3
14	T	November 18, 1967	2–2	Philadelphia Flyers (1967–68)	5–5–4
15	L	November 19, 1967	2–5	@ New York Rangers (1967–68)	5–6–4
16	L	November 22, 1967	0–3	@ Toronto Maple Leafs (1967–68)	5–7–4
17	L	November 25, 1967	1–4	Chicago Black Hawks (1967–68)	5–8–4
18	L	November 26, 1967	1–2	@ Chicago Black Hawks (1967–68)	5–9–4
19	L	November 29, 1967	1–5	@ Boston Bruins (1967–68)	5–10–4
20	T	November 30, 1967	1–1	@ Montreal Canadiens (1967–68)	5–10–5

December

Game	Result	Date	Score	Opponent	Record
21	W	December 2, 1967	5–1	@ St. Louis Blues (1967–68)	6–10–5
22	W	December 3, 1967	4–3	@ Chicago Black Hawks (1967–68)	7–10–5
23	T	December 6, 1967	1–1	Toronto Maple Leafs (1967–68)	7–10–6
24	L	December 9, 1967	2–3	Pittsburgh Penguins (1967–68)	7–11–6
25	W	December 10, 1967	7–4	@ Pittsburgh Penguins (1967–68)	8–11–6
26	W	December 13, 1967	4–0	Los Angeles Kings (1967–68)	9–11–6
27	W	December 15, 1967	3–0	@ Los Angeles Kings (1967–68)	10–11–6
28	W	December 16, 1967	1–0	@ Oakland Seals (1967–68)	11–11–6
29	L	December 21, 1967	0–6	@ Philadelphia Flyers (1967–68)	11–12–6
30	L	December 23, 1967	0–4	@ Pittsburgh Penguins (1967–68)	11–13–6
31	L	December 25, 1967	0–1	St. Louis Blues (1967–68)	11–14–6
32	T	December 27, 1967	3–3	@ New York Rangers (1967–68)	11–14–7
33	L	December 28, 1967	2–6	@ Montreal Canadiens (1967–68)	11–15–7
34	W	December 30, 1967	5–4	Boston Bruins (1967–68)	12–15–7

January

Game	Result	Date	Score	Opponent	Record
35	W	January 3, 1968	6–0	Los Angeles Kings (1967–68)	13–15–7
36	T	January 6, 1968	5–5	@ Oakland Seals (1967–68)	13–15–8
37	W	January 10, 1968	6–4	Philadelphia Flyers (1967–68)	14–15–8
38	T	January 13, 1968	2–2	Oakland Seals (1967–68)	14–15–9
39	L	January 14, 1968	2–9	@ Boston Bruins (1967–68)	14–16–9
40	L	January 17, 1968	0–5	@ St. Louis Blues (1967–68)	14–17–9
41	L	January 18, 1968	2–4	Philadelphia Flyers (1967–68)	14–18–9
42	L	January 20, 1968	1–5	@ Toronto Maple Leafs (1967–68)	14–19–9
43	W	January 21, 1968	4–3	Pittsburgh Penguins (1967–68)	15–19–9
44	L	January 24, 1968	2–5	@ St. Louis Blues (1967–68)	15–20–9
45	W	January 25, 1968	3–0	@ Philadelphia Flyers (1967–68)	16–20–9
46	W	January 27, 1968	3–1	Oakland Seals (1967–68)	17–20–9
47	W	January 28, 1968	2–1	Detroit Red Wings (1967–68)	18–20–9
48	W	January 31, 1968	6–1	Los Angeles Kings (1967–68)	19–20–9

February

Game	Result	Date	Score	Opponent	Record
49	L	February 3, 1968	1–8	@ Detroit Red Wings (1967–68)	19–21–9
50	W	February 4, 1968	4–3	Oakland Seals (1967–68)	20–21–9
51	W	February 7, 1968	4–2	@ Los Angeles Kings (1967–68)	21–21–9
52	W	February 10, 1968	5–2	@ Oakland Seals (1967–68)	22–21–9
53	L	February 11, 1968	2–3	Philadelphia Flyers (1967–68)	22–22–9
54	L	February 14, 1968	3–6	@ Pittsburgh Penguins (1967–68)	22–23–9
55	L	February 15, 1968	2–6	New York Rangers (1967–68)	22–24–9
56	T	February 17, 1968	2–2	St. Louis Blues (1967–68)	22–24–10
57	W	February 21, 1968	5–3	Boston Bruins (1967–68)	23–24–10
58	L	February 22, 1968	3–7	@ Philadelphia Flyers (1967–68)	23–25–10
59	L	February 24, 1968	1–3	@ Detroit Red Wings (1967–68)	23–26–10
60	T	February 25, 1968	3–3	Oakland Seals (1967–68)	23–26–11
61	L	February 28, 1968	3–6	@ Oakland Seals (1967–68)	23–27–11

March

Game	Result	Date	Score	Opponent	Record
62	W	March 2, 1968	3–2	Montreal Canadiens (1967–68)	24–27–11
63	T	March 7, 1968	2–2	Pittsburgh Penguins (1967–68)	24–27–12
64	T	March 9, 1968	1–1	New York Rangers (1967–68)	24–27–13
65	L	March 10, 1968	0–2	@ Philadelphia Flyers (1967–68)	24–28–13
66	L	March 13, 1968	2–4	Philadelphia Flyers (1967–68)	24–29–13
67	L	March 16, 1968	1–2	Los Angeles Kings (1967–68)	24–30–13
68	W	March 17, 1968	5–1	Detroit Red Wings (1967–68)	25–30–13
69	T	March 20, 1968	3–3	@ Los Angeles Kings (1967–68)	25–30–14
70	W	March 23, 1968	3–0	Pittsburgh Penguins (1967–68)	26–30–14
71	T	March 24, 1968	4–4	@ Pittsburgh Penguins (1967–68)	26–30–15
72	W	March 27, 1968	5–3	@ Los Angeles Kings (1967–68)	27–30–15
73	L	March 30, 1968	2–3	@ St. Louis Blues (1967–68)	27–31–15
74	L	March 31, 1968	3–5	St. Louis Blues (1967–68)	27–32–15

Legend: Win (2 points) Loss (0 points) Tie (1 point)

=== Playoffs ===
1968 Stanley Cup playoffs
Quarterfinals vs. (W2) Los Angeles Kings – North Stars win 4–3

Game	Result	Date	Score	Opponent	Series
1	W	April 4, 1968	1–2	@ Los Angeles Kings	North Stars lead 1–0
2	W	April 6, 1968	0–2	@ Los Angeles Kings	North Stars lead 2–0
3	L	April 9, 1968	7–5	Los Angeles Kings	North Stars lead 2–1
4	L	April 11, 1968	3–2	Los Angeles Kings	Series tied 2–2
5	L	April 13, 1968	2–3	@ Los Angeles Kings	Kings lead 3–2
6	W	April 16, 1968	4–3 (OT)	Los Angeles Kings	Series tied 3–3
7	W	April 18, 1968	9–4	@ Los Angeles Kings	North Stars win 4–3

Semifinals vs. (W3) St. Louis Blues – Blues win 4–3

Game	Result	Date	Score	Opponent	Series
1	W	April 21, 1968	3–5	@ St. Louis Blues	North Stars lead 1–0
2	L	April 22, 1968	3–2 (OT)	St. Louis Blues	Series tied 1–1
3	W	April 25, 1968	5–1	@ St. Louis Blues	North Stars lead 2–1
4	L	April 27, 1968	3–4 (OT)	@ St. Louis Blues	Series tied 2–2
5	L	April 29, 1968	2–3 (OT)	@ St. Louis Blues	Blues lead 3–2
6	W	May 1, 1968	5–1	St. Louis Blues	Series tied 3–3
7	L	May 3, 1968	1–2 (2OT)	@ St. Louis Blues	Blues win 4–3

Legend: Win Loss

== Player statistics ==
=== Forwards ===
Note: GP = Games played; G = Goals; A = Assists; Pts = Points; PIM = Penalty minutes

Player	GP	G	A	Pts	PIM
Wayne Connelly	74	35	21	56	40
Ray Cullen	67	28	25	53	18
Andre Boudrias	74	18	35	53	42
Dave Balon	73	15	32	47	84
Parker MacDonald	69	19	23	42	22
Bill Goldsworthy	68	14	19	33	68
J. P. Parise	43	11	16	27	27
Bill Collins	71	9	11	20	41
Milan Marcetta	36	4	13	17	6
Bill Masterton	38	4	8	12	4
Sandy Fitzpatrick	18	3	6	9	6
Ted Taylor	31	3	5	8	34
Bronco Horvath	14	1	6	7	4
Duke Harris	22	1	4	5	4
Murray Hall	17	2	1	3	10
Ted McCaskill	4	0	2	2	0

=== Defensemen ===
Note: GP = Games played; G = Goals; A = Assists; Pts = Points; PIM = Penalty minutes

Player	GP	G	A	Pts	PIM
Mike McMahon	74	14	33	47	71
Bob Woytowich	66	4	17	21	63
Bob McCord	70	3	9	12	39
Elmer Vasko	70	1	6	7	45
Pete Goegan	46	1	2	3	30
Bill Plager	32	0	2	2	30
Lou Nanne	2	0	1	1	0
Jean-Guy Talbot	4	0	0	0	4
Marshall Johnston	7	0	0	0	0
Don Johns	4	0	0	0	6

=== Goaltending ===
Note: GP = Games played; W = Wins; L = Losses; T = Ties; SO = Shutouts; GAA = Goals against average

Player	GP	MIN	W	L	T	SO	GAA
Gary Bauman	26	1294	4	13	5	0	3.48
Cesare Maniago	52	2877	22	16	9	6	2.77
Carl Wetzel	5	269	1	3	1	0	4.02

== Draft picks ==
=== Expansion draft ===
#	Player	Drafted from
1.	Cesare Maniago (G)	New York Rangers
2.	Garry Bauman (G)	Montreal Canadiens
3.	Dave Balon (LW)	Montreal Canadiens
4.	Ray Cullen (C)	Detroit Red Wings
5.	Bob Woytowich (D)	Boston Bruins
6.	Jean-Guy Talbot (D)	Montreal Canadiens
7.	Wayne Connelly (RW)	Boston Bruins
8.	Ted Taylor (LW)	Detroit Red Wings
9.	Pete Goegan (D)	Detroit Red Wings
10.	Len Lunde (C)	Chicago Black Hawks
11.	Bill Goldsworthy (RW)	Boston Bruins
12.	Andre Pronovost (LW)	Detroit Red Wings
13.	Elmer Vasko (D)	Chicago Black Hawks
14.	Murray Hall (W)	Chicago Black Hawks
15.	Bryan Watson (D/W)	Detroit Red Wings
16.	Bill Collins (C)	New York Rangers
17.	Sandy Fitzpatrick (C)	New York Rangers
18.	Parker MacDonald (C)	Detroit Red Wings
19.	Billy Taylor (C)	Chicago Black Hawks
20.	Dave Richardson (LW)	Chicago Black Hawks

=== Amateur draft ===
Minnesota's draft picks at the 1967 NHL amateur draft held at the Queen Elizabeth Hotel in Montreal.

Round	#	Player	Nationality	College/Junior/Club team (League)
1	4	Wayne Cheesman	Canada	Whitby Dunlops (MetJHL)
2	13	Larry Mick	Canada	Pembroke Lumber Kings (CJAHL)

== See also ==
- 1967–68 NHL season
