= 1967–68 Toronto Maple Leafs season =

NHL hockey team season

1967–68 Toronto Maple Leafs
- Division: 5th East
- 1967–68 record: 33–31–10
- Home record: 24–9–4
- Road record: 9–22–6
- Goals for: 209
- Goals against: 176

Team information
- General manager: Punch Imlach
- Coach: Punch Imlach
- Captain: George Armstrong
- Arena: Maple Leaf Gardens

Team leaders
- Goals: Mike Walton (30)
- Assists: Dave Keon (37)
- Points: Mike Walton (59)
- Penalty minutes: Tim Horton, Pete Stemkowski (82)
- Wins: Bruce Gamble (19)
- Goals against average: Johnny Bower (2.25)

The Maple Leafs entered the season as defending Stanley Cup champions. The franchise hosted the 21st National Hockey League National Hockey League All-Star Game. It was played at Maple Leaf Gardens on January 16, 1968. The Toronto Maple Leafs defeated an all-star team by a score of 4–3. The Leafs missed the playoffs for the first time since the 1957–58 season with a record of 33–31–10 for 76 points for a fifth place in the East Division. The Leafs finished with a better record than any of the six expansion teams that season.

== Offseason ==
=== NHL draft ===
Round	Pick	Player	Nationality	College/junior/club team
2	16	J. Bob Kelly	Canada	Port Arthur Marrs (TBJHL)

=== Players lost in expansion draft ===
The following Maple Leafs were lost to various franchises in the expansion draft.

Player	Position	Drafted to
Al Arbour	(D)	St. Louis Blues
Bob Baun	(D)	Oakland Seals
Don Blackburn	(W)	Philadelphia Flyers
John Brenneman	(LW)	St. Louis Blues
Terry Clancy	(W)	Oakland Seals
Mike Corrigan	(LW)	Los Angeles Kings
Kent Douglas	(D)	Oakland Seals
Darryl Edestrand	(D)	St. Louis Blues
Aut Erickson	(D)	Oakland Seals
Bill Flett	(RW)	Los Angeles Kings
Pat Hannigan	(LW)	Philadelphia Flyers
Fred Hucul	(D)	St. Louis Blues
Larry Jeffrey	(LW)	Pittsburgh Penguins
Ed Joyal	(C)	Los Angeles Kings
Larry Keenan	(LW)	St. Louis Blues
Mike Laughton	(W)	Oakland Seals
Lowell MacDonald	(LW)	Los Angeles Kings
Terry Sawchuk	(G)	Los Angeles Kings
Brit Selby	(W)	Philadelphia Flyers
Gary Smith	(G)	Oakland Seals
Gary Veneruzzo	(LW)	St. Louis Blues

== Regular season ==
=== Season standings ===
East Division
		GP	W	L	T	GF	GA	DIFF	Pts
1	Montreal Canadiens	74	42	22	10	236	167	+69	94
2	New York Rangers	74	39	23	12	226	183	+43	90
3	Boston Bruins	74	37	27	10	259	216	+43	84
4	Chicago Black Hawks	74	32	26	16	212	222	−10	80
5	Toronto Maple Leafs	74	33	31	10	209	176	+33	76
6	Detroit Red Wings	74	27	35	12	245	257	−12	66

=== Record vs. opponents ===
==== Vs. East Division ====
1967–68 NHL records
Team	BOS	CHI	DET	MTL	NYR	TOR	Total
Boston	—	5–3–2	5–3–2	5–5	6–2–2	2–5–3	23–18–9
Chicago	3–5–2	—	4–3–3	2–6–2	3–4–3	5–4–1	17–22–11
Detroit	3–5–2	3–4–3	—	3–6–1	3–5–2	1–8–1	13–28–9
Montreal	5–5	6–2–2	6–3–1	—	4–4–2	5–3–2	26–17–7
New York	2–6–2	4–3–3	5–3–2	4–4–2	—	7–3	22–19–9
Toronto	5–2–3	4–5–1	8–1–1	3–5–2	3–7	—	23–20–7

==== Vs. West Division ====
1967–68 NHL records
Team	LAK	MIN	OAK	PHI	PIT	STL	Total
Boston	3–1	2–2	2–2	3–1	2–2	2–1–1	14–9–1
Chicago	2–1–1	3–1	3–0–1	3–1	2–1–1	2–0–2	15–4–5
Detroit	1–2–1	2–2	3–0–1	3–1	3–1	2–1–1	14–7–3
Montreal	2–2	2–1–1	3–1	2–1–1	4–0	3–0–1	16–5–3
New York	2–2	2–0–2	4–0	3–1	3–0–1	3–1	17–4–3
Toronto	2–2	2–1–1	3–1	1–3	1–2–1	1–2–1	10–11–3

== Schedule and results ==
1967–68 regular season
October

Game	Result	Date	Score	Opponent	Record
1	W	October 14, 1967	5–1	Chicago Black Hawks (1967–68)	1–0–0
2	W	October 15, 1967	5–3	@ Chicago Black Hawks (1967–68)	2–0–0
3	L	October 18, 1967	2–3	Detroit Red Wings (1967–68)	2–1–0
4	L	October 19, 1967	0–1	@ Montreal Canadiens (1967–68)	2–2–0
5	L	October 21, 1967	3–5	New York Rangers (1967–68)	2–3–0
6	W	October 25, 1967	4–2	Los Angeles Kings (1967–68)	3–3–0
7	W	October 28, 1967	5–2	California Seals (1967–68)	4–3–0
8	L	October 29, 1967	2–3	@ New York Rangers (1967–68)	4–4–0

November

Game	Result	Date	Score	Opponent	Record
9	W	November 1, 1967	5–0	Montreal Canadiens (1967–68)	5–4–0
10	W	November 2, 1967	9–3	@ Detroit Red Wings (1967–68)	6–4–0
11	W	November 4, 1967	4–2	New York Rangers (1967–68)	7–4–0
12	T	November 5, 1967	2–2	@ Boston Bruins (1967–68)	7–4–1
13	W	November 8, 1967	6–1	@ California Seals(1967–68)	8–4–1
14	L	November 9, 1967	1–4	@ Los Angeles Kings (1967–68)	8–5–1
15	L	November 11, 1967	1–2	@ Minnesota North Stars (1967–68)	8–6–1
16	W	November 15, 1967	4–2	Boston Bruins (1967–68)	9–6–1
17	T	November 18, 1967	2–2	Chicago Black Hawks (1967–68)	9–6–2
18	L	November 19, 1967	2–6	@ Boston Bruins (1967–68)	9–7–2
19	W	November 22, 1967	3–0	Minnesota North Stars (1967–68)	10–7–2
20	W	November 25, 1967	3–2	Detroit Red Wings (1967–68)	11–7–2
21	W	November 29, 1967	2–1	Montreal Canadiens (1967–68)	12–7–2
22	T	November 30, 1967	3–3	@ Detroit Red Wings (1967–68)	12–7–3

December

Game	Result	Date	Score	Opponent	Record
23	W	December 2, 1967	3–0	California Seals (1967–68)	13–7–3
24	T	December 6, 1967	1–1	@ Minnesota North Stars (1967–68)	13–7–4
25	T	December 9, 1967	3–3	Boston Bruins (1967–68)	13–7–5
26	L	December 10, 1967	1–2	@ St. Louis Blues (1967–68)	13–8–5
27	L	December 13, 1967	1–2	Pittsburgh Penguins (1967–68)	13–9–5
28	W	December 16, 1967	4–2	New York Rangers (1967–68)	14–9–5
29	L	December 17, 1967	0–2	@ Chicago Black Hawks (1967–68)	14–10–5
30	L	December 20, 1967	0–5	@ Montreal Canadiens (1967–68)	14–11–5
31	W	December 23, 1967	5–3	Detroit Red Wings (1967–68)	15–11–5
32	W	December 25, 1967	3–1	@ Detroit Red Wings (1967–68)	16–11–5
33	T	December 27, 1967	2–2	Montreal Canadiens (1967–68)	16–11–6
34	W	December 30, 1967	8–1	St. Louis Blues (1967–68)	17–11–6
35	L	December 31, 1967	0–4	@ New York Rangers (1967–68)	17–12–6

January

Game	Result	Date	Score	Opponent	Record
36	T	January 3, 1968	1–1	@ Montreal Canadiens (1967–68)	17–12–7
37	T	January 6, 1968	3–3	Boston Bruins (1967–68)	17–12–8
38	L	January 7, 1968	2–6	@ New York Rangers (1967–68)	17–13–8
39	W	January 10, 1968	2–1	Detroit Red Wings (1967–68)	18–13–8
40	L	January 12, 1968	3–4	@ Pittsburgh Penguins (1967–68)	18–14–8
41	W	January 13, 1968	7–0	Pittsburgh Penguins (1967–68)	19–14–8
42	W	January 18, 1968	4–2	@ Boston Bruins (1967–68)	20–14–8
43	W	January 20, 1968	5–1	Minnesota North Stars (1967–68)	21–14–8
44	W	January 21, 1968	2–0	@ Detroit Red Wings (1967–68)	22–14–8
45	L	January 24, 1968	1–2	Philadelphia Flyers (1967–68)	22–15–8
46	L	January 27, 1968	1–4	Chicago Black Hawks (1967–68)	22–16–8
47	W	January 28, 1968	3–1	@ Chicago Black Hawks (1967–68)	23–16–8
48	L	January 30, 1968	0–3	@ Montreal Canadiens (1967–68)	23–17–8

February

Game	Result	Date	Score	Opponent	Record
49	T	February 3, 1968	3–3	@ Pittsburgh Penguins (1967–68)	23–17–9
50	L	February 4, 1968	1–4	@ Philadelphia Flyers (1967–68)	23–18–9
51	L	February 7, 1968	2–3	@ Chicago Black Hawks (1967–68)	23–19–9
52	L	February 11, 1968	3–4	@ Oakland Seals (1967–68)	23–20–9
53	L	February 12, 1968	0–2	@ Los Angeles Kings (1967–68)	23–21–9
54	L	February 14, 1968	2–4	Montreal Canadiens (1967–68)	23–22–9
55	L	February 17, 1968	2–3	New York Rangers (1967–68)	23–23–9
56	L	February 21, 1968	1–5	St. Louis Blues (1967–68)	23–24–9
57	W	February 24, 1968	1–0	Boston Bruins (1967–68)	24–24–9
58	L	February 25, 1968	1–3	@ New York Rangers (1967–68)	24–25–9
59	L	February 28, 1968	0–1	Chicago Black Hawks (1967–68)	24–26–9
60	L	February 29, 1968	1–4	@ Boston Bruins (1967–68)	24–27–9

March

Game	Result	Date	Score	Opponent	Record
61	W	March 2, 1968	5–2	Los Angeles Kings (1967–68)	25–27–9
62	W	March 6, 1968	7–2	Philadelphia Flyers (1967–68)	26–27–9
63	W	March 9, 1968	7–5	Detroit Red Wings (1967–68)	27–27–9
64	L	March 10, 1968	0–4	@ Chicago Black Hawks (1967–68)	27–28–9
65	T	March 13, 1968	3–3	@ St. Louis Blues (1967–68)	27–28–10
66	W	March 16, 1968	3–0	Boston Bruins (1967–68)	28–28–10
67	L	March 17, 1968	4–7	@ Philadelphia Flyers (1967–68)	28–29–10
68	L	March 20, 1968	2–3	@ Montreal Canadiens (1967–68)	28–30–10
69	W	March 21, 1968	5–2	@ Detroit Red Wings (1967–68)	29–30–10
70	W	March 23, 1968	3–1	New York Rangers (1967–68)	30–30–10
71	L	March 24, 1968	2–4	@ New York Rangers (1967–68)	30–31–10
72	W	March 27, 1968	6–0	Montreal Canadiens (1967–68)	31–31–10
73	W	March 30, 1968	3–0	Chicago Black Hawks (1967–68)	32–31–10
74	W	March 31, 1968	4–1	@ Boston Bruins (1967–68)	33–31–10

Legend: Win (2 points) Loss (0 points) Tie (1 point)

== Player statistics ==
=== Regular season ===
Scoring

Player	GP	G	A	Pts	PIM
Mike Walton	73	30	29	59	48
Bob Pulford	74	20	30	50	40
Ron Ellis	74	28	20	48	8
Dave Keon	67	11	37	48	4
Murray Oliver	74	16	21	37	18
Frank Mahovlich	50	19	17	36	30
George Armstrong	62	13	21	34	4
Jim Pappin	58	13	15	28	37
Tim Horton	69	4	23	27	82
Brian Conacher	64	11	14	25	31
Pete Stemkowski	60	7	15	22	82
Larry Hillman	55	3	17	20	13
Marcel Pronovost	70	3	17	20	48
Wayne Carleton	65	8	11	19	34
Norm Ullman	13	5	12	17	2
Allan Stanley	64	1	13	14	16
Paul Henderson	13	5	6	11	8
Duane Rupp	71	1	8	9	42
Floyd Smith	6	6	1	7	0
Mike Byers	10	2	2	4	0
Mike Pelyk	24	0	3	3	55
Garry Unger	15	1	1	2	4
Tom Martin	3	1	0	1	0
Jim McKenny	5	1	0	1	0
Johnny Bower	43	0	1	1	14
J.P. Parise	1	0	1	1	0
Bruce Gamble	41	0	0	0	2
Duke Harris	4	0	0	0	0
Andre Hinse	4	0	0	0	0
Darryl Sly	17	0	0	0	4

Goaltending

Player	MIN	GP	W	L	T	GA	GAA	SA	SV	SV%	SO
Bruce Gamble	2201	41	19	13	3	85	2.32				5
Johnny Bower	2239	43	14	18	7	84	2.25				4
Team:	4440	74	33	31	10	169	2.28				9

== Awards and records ==
- Johnny Bower and Bruce Gamble, Runner-up, Vezina Trophy
- Bruce Gamble, All-Star Game MVP
- Tim Horton, 1967–68 NHL First Team All-Star

== Transactions ==
The Maple Leafs were involved in the following transactions during the 1967–68 season.

=== Trades ===
June 6, 1967	To Minnesota North Stars Ken Broderick; Barry MacKenzie; Gary Dineen	To Toronto Maple Leafs Cash
June 8, 1967	To Los Angeles Kings Red Kelly	To Toronto Maple Leafs Ken Block
September 12, 1967	To Philadelphia Flyers Al Millar	To Toronto Maple Leafs Cash
September 12, 1967	To Phoenix Roadrunners (WHL) Tom Polanic	To Toronto Maple Leafs Cash
October 3, 1967	To California Seals Gerry Ehman	To Toronto Maple Leafs Bryan Hextall Jr. J.P. Parise
October 15, 1967	To Phoenix Roadrunners (WHL) Walt McKechnie	To Toronto Maple Leafs Steve Witiuk
December 23, 1967	To Minnesota North Stars J.P. Parise; Milan Marcetta	To Toronto Maple Leafs Ted Taylor; Murray Hall; Don Johns; Len Landle; Duke Harris; Carl Wetzel
January 13, 1968	To Minnesota North Stars Bronco Horvath	To Toronto Maple Leafs Cash
March 3, 1968	To Rochester Americans (AHL) Duke Harris	To Toronto Maple Leafs Cash
March 3, 1968	To Detroit Red Wings Frank Mahovlich; Pete Stemkowski; Garry Unger; Carl Brewer	To Toronto Maple Leafs Doug Barrie; Norm Ullman; Paul Henderson; Floyd Smith
March 25, 1968	To St. Louis Blues Cash	To Toronto Maple Leafs Pat Quinn
May 14, 1968	To Oakland Seals Cash	To Toronto Maple Leafs Terry Clancy
May 23, 1968	To Chicago Black Hawks Jim Pappin	To Toronto Maple Leafs Pierre Pilote
June 6, 1968	To Detroit Red Wings Doug Barrie	To Toronto Maple Leafs Cash
June 6, 1968	To Rochester Americans (AHL) Murray Hall	To Toronto Maple Leafs Cash
June 11, 1968	To Vancouver Canucks (WHL) Bob Barlow	To Toronto Maple Leafs Cash

=== Intra-league draft ===
June 12, 1968	To New York Rangers Brian Conacher
June 12, 1968	To Minnesota North Stars Duane Rupp
June 12, 1968	To New York Rangers Larry Hillman
June 12, 1968	From Minnesota North Stars Bill Plager
June 12, 1968	From New York Rangers Larry Mickey
June 12, 1968	From Minnesota North Stars Bill Sutherland
June 12, 1968	From Detroit Red Wings Gary Marsh

=== Reverse draft ===
June 13, 1968	To Philadelphia Flyers Allan Stanley
June 13, 1968	To Portland Buckaroos (WHL) Rick Foley
June 13, 1968	From Detroit Red Wings George Gardner

=== Free agents ===
Player / Former team; Rene Robert / Undrafted free agent	Player / New team; Dickie Moore / St. Louis Blues
