= List of NHL game sevens =

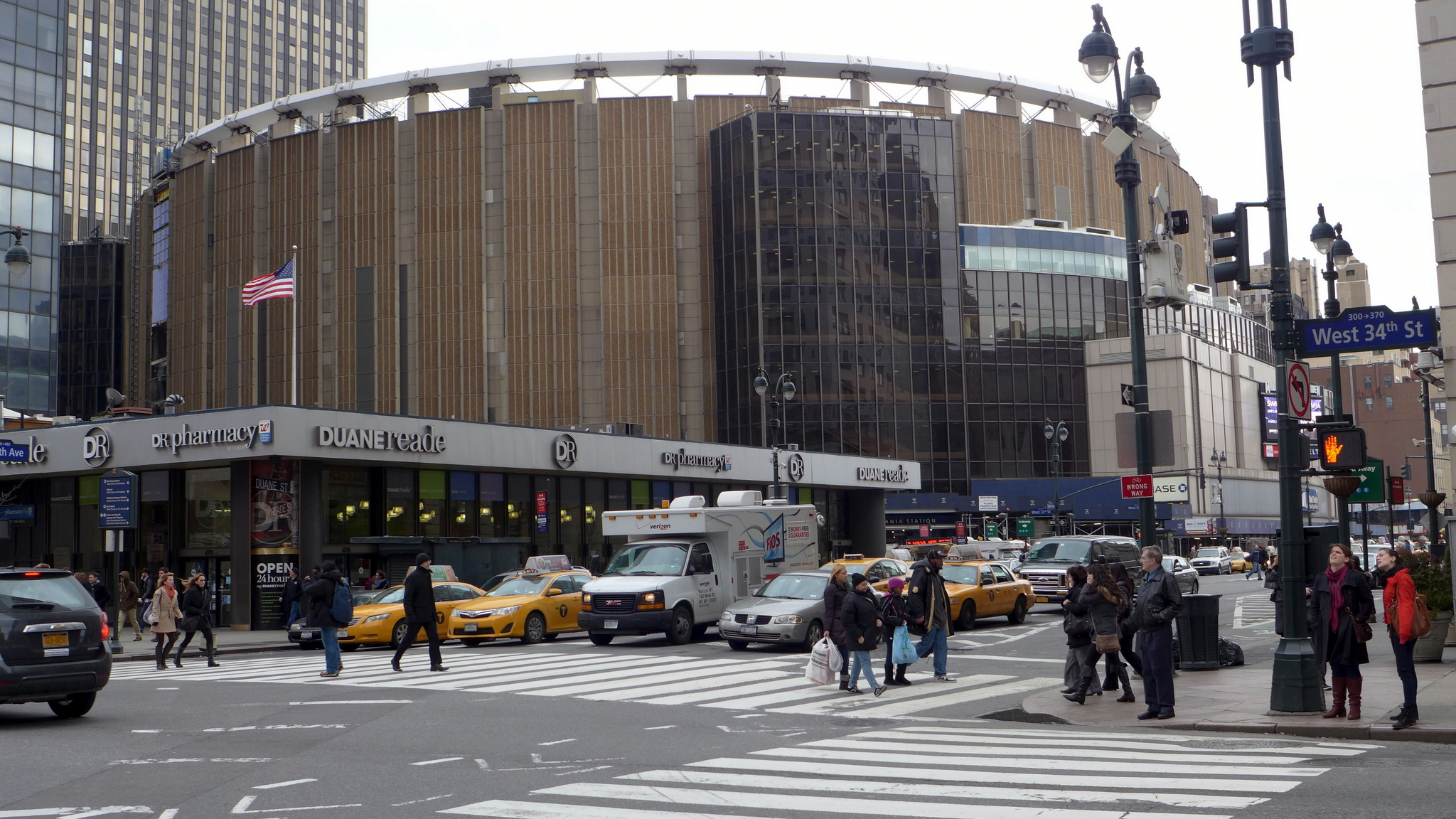
Since its opening in 1968, nine game sevens have been played at Madison Square Garden.

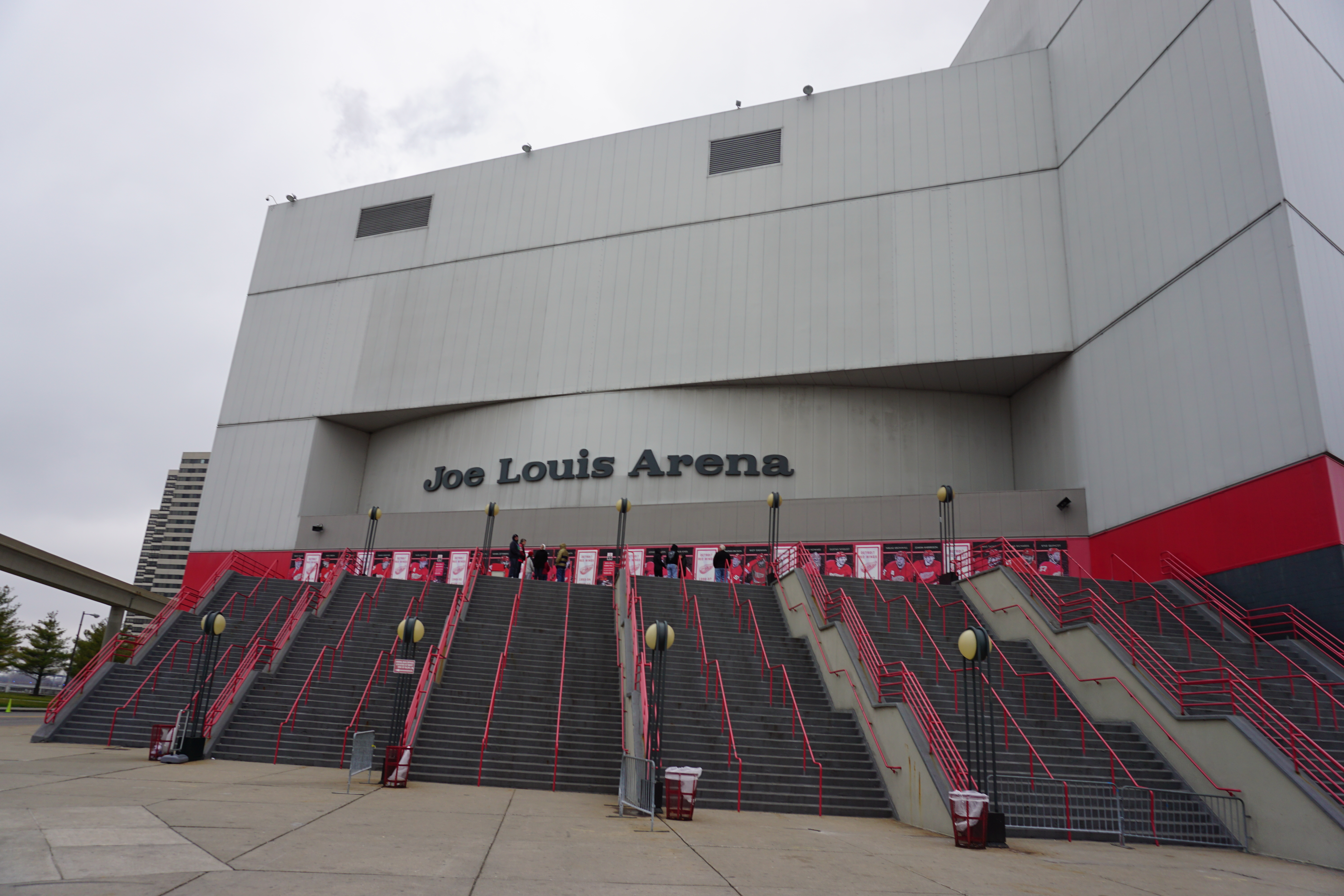
Between 1979 and 2017, Joe Louis Arena hosted eight game sevens, including one in the 2009 final.

In the National Hockey League (NHL), a game seven is the final game in a best-of-seven series in the Stanley Cup playoffs. Based on the playoffs format arrangement, (Note: The home-and-away format in most rounds of the playoffs, is the 2–2–1–1–1 format (the team with home-ice advantage plays on their home ice in games one, two, five and seven, including the Stanley Cup Final). In 1994, playoff series featuring a Central Division team against a Pacific Division team were played using a 2–3–2 format.) it is played in the venue of the team holding home-ice advantage for the series. Game seven is the only game in a best-of-seven series whose necessity cannot be determined until the preceding game is completed.

The Stanley Cup Final first employed the best-of-seven format in 1939. The league's semifinals also used the best-of-seven format beginning that same year, as well as the quarterfinal round that was added in 1968. Beginning in 1982, the playoff format was changed from semifinals and quarterfinals, to conference finals and division finals, respectively. A division semifinal round was also added in 1982, but did not begin to use the best-of-seven format until 1987. Starting in 1994, the division final and division semifinal rounds became the conference semifinal and conference quarterfinal rounds, respectively. Beginning with 2014, these rounds were renamed to simply the "first" and "second" rounds.

Since instituting the best-of-seven format for the 1939 Stanley Cup playoffs, 202 game sevens have been played. Of those, 84 have been won by the road team. There have been 19 seasons in which no game seven was played: 1940, 1943, 1944, 1946, 1947, 1948, 1951, 1956, 1957, 1958, 1960, 1961, 1962, 1963, 1966, 1967, 1970, 1973, and 1977. In 2005, no playoffs were held due to the 2004–05 NHL lockout. The Columbus Blue Jackets and Utah Mammoth are the only active NHL franchises that have not played a game 7. The 1994, 2011, and 2014 playoffs hold the record for most game sevens played, with seven out of a possible fifteen. The Boston Bruins have played in a record 31 game sevens. The Montreal Canadiens hold the record for game seven wins at 17. The Toronto Maple Leafs, Colorado Avalanche, Boston Bruins, and Los Angeles Kings hold the record for most game sevens played in a single season, having played three in 1993, 2002, 2011, and 2014, respectively. The Bruins and Kings won all three.

== Key ==
| OT | Overtime (the number in front indicates the number of overtime periods played, if there were more than one) |
| † | Indicates the team that won a game seven after coming back from an 0–3 series deficit |
| § | Indicates the team that lost a game seven after coming back from an 0–3 series deficit |
| ∞ | Indicates a game seven that was played at a neutral site |
| Road* | Indicates a game seven that was won by the (designated) road team |
| Year (X) | Indicates the number of game sevens played in that year's postseason Each year is linked to an article about that particular NHL season |
| Team (#) | Indicates team and the number of game sevens played by that team at that point |

== All-time game sevens ==
| Year | Playoff round | Date | Venue | Winner | Result | Loser | Ref. |
|---|---|---|---|---|---|---|---|
| 1939 (1) | Semifinals | April 2, 1939 | Boston Garden | Boston Bruins (1) | 2–1 (3OT) | New York Rangers (1)§ | |
| 1941 (1) | Semifinals | April 3, 1941 | Boston Garden | Boston Bruins (2) | 2–1 | Toronto Maple Leafs (1) | |
| 1942 (1) | Final | April 18, 1942 | Maple Leaf Gardens | Toronto Maple Leafs (2)† | 3–1 | Detroit Red Wings (1) | |
| 1945 (1) | Semifinals | April 3, 1945 | Detroit Olympia | Detroit Red Wings (2) | 5–3 | Boston Bruins (3) | |
| 1945 (2) | Final | April 22, 1945 | Detroit Olympia | Toronto Maple Leafs (3) | 2–1* | Detroit Red Wings (3)§ | |
| 1949 (1) | Semifinals | April 5, 1949 | Detroit Olympia | Detroit Red Wings (4) | 3–1 | Montreal Canadiens (1) | |
| 1950 (1) | Semifinals | April 9, 1950 | Detroit Olympia | Detroit Red Wings (5) | 1–0 (OT) | Toronto Maple Leafs (4) | |
| 1950 (2) | Final | April 23, 1950 | Detroit Olympia | Detroit Red Wings (6) | 4–3 (2OT) | New York Rangers (2) | |
| 1952 (1) | Semifinals | April 8, 1952 | Montreal Forum | Montreal Canadiens (2) | 3–1 | Boston Bruins (4) | |
| 1953 (1) | Semifinals | April 7, 1953 | Montreal Forum | Montreal Canadiens (3) | 4–1 | Chicago Black Hawks (1) | |
| 1954 (1) | Final | April 16, 1954 | Detroit Olympia | Detroit Red Wings (7) | 2–1 (OT) | Montreal Canadiens (4) | |
| 1955 (1) | Final | April 14, 1955 | Detroit Olympia | Detroit Red Wings (8) | 3–1 | Montreal Canadiens (5) | |
| 1959 (1) | Semifinals | April 7, 1959 | Boston Garden | Toronto Maple Leafs (5) | 3–2* | Boston Bruins (5) | |
| 1964 (1) | Semifinals | April 9, 1964 | Montreal Forum | Toronto Maple Leafs (6) | 3–1* | Montreal Canadiens (6) | |
| 1964 (2) | Semifinals | April 9, 1964 | Chicago Stadium | Detroit Red Wings (9) | 4–2* | Chicago Black Hawks (2) | |
| 1964 (3) | Final | April 25, 1964 | Maple Leaf Gardens | Toronto Maple Leafs (7) | 4–0 | Detroit Red Wings (10) | |
| 1965 (1) | Semifinals | April 15, 1965 | Detroit Olympia | Chicago Black Hawks (3) | 4–2* | Detroit Red Wings (11) | |
| 1965 (2) | Final | May 1, 1965 | Montreal Forum | Montreal Canadiens (7) | 4–0 | Chicago Black Hawks (4) | |
| 1968 (1) | Quarterfinals | April 18, 1968 | Spectrum | St. Louis Blues (1) | 3–1* | Philadelphia Flyers (1) | |
| 1968 (2) | Quarterfinals | April 18, 1968 | Long Beach Arena | Minnesota North Stars (1) | 9–4* | Los Angeles Kings (1) | |
| 1968 (3) | Semifinals | May 3, 1968 | St. Louis Arena | St. Louis Blues (2) | 2–1 (2OT) | Minnesota North Stars (2) | |
| 1969 (1) | Quarterfinals | April 13, 1969 | Oakland–Alameda County Coliseum Arena | Los Angeles Kings (2) | 5–3* | Oakland Seals (1) | |
| 1971 (1) | Quarterfinals | April 18, 1971 | Boston Garden | Montreal Canadiens (8) | 4–2* | Boston Bruins (6) | |
| 1971 (2) | Semifinals | May 2, 1971 | Chicago Stadium | Chicago Black Hawks (5) | 4–2 | New York Rangers (3) | |
| 1971 (3) | Final | May 18, 1971 | Chicago Stadium | Montreal Canadiens (9) | 3–2* | Chicago Black Hawks (6) | |
| 1972 (1) | Quarterfinals | April 16, 1972 | Metropolitan Sports Center | St. Louis Blues (3) | 2–1 (OT)* | Minnesota North Stars (3) | |
| 1974 (1) | Semifinals | May 5, 1974 | Spectrum | Philadelphia Flyers (2) | 4–3 | New York Rangers (4) | |
| 1975 (1) | Quarterfinals | April 26, 1975 | Civic Arena | New York Islanders (1)† | 1–0* | Pittsburgh Penguins (1) | |
| 1975 (2) | Semifinals | May 13, 1975 | Spectrum | Philadelphia Flyers (3) | 4–1 | New York Islanders (2) § | |
| 1976 (1) | Quarterfinals | April 25, 1976 | Spectrum | Philadelphia Flyers (4) | 7–3 | Toronto Maple Leafs (8) | |
| 1976 (2) | Quarterfinals | April 25, 1976 | Boston Garden | Boston Bruins (7) | 3–0 | Los Angeles Kings (3) | |
| 1978 (1) | Quarterfinals | April 29, 1978 | Nassau Coliseum | Toronto Maple Leafs (9) | 2–1 (OT)* | New York Islanders (3) | |
| 1979 (1) | Semifinals | May 10, 1979 | Montreal Forum | Montreal Canadiens (10) | 5–4 (OT) | Boston Bruins (8) | |
| 1980 (1) | Quarterfinals | April 27, 1980 | Montreal Forum | Minnesota North Stars (4) | 3–2* | Montreal Canadiens (11) | |
| 1981 (1) | Quarterfinals | April 26, 1981 | Spectrum | Calgary Flames (1) | 4–1* | Philadelphia Flyers (5) | |
| 1982 (1) | Division finals | April 25, 1982 | Boston Garden | Quebec Nordiques (1) | 2–1* | Boston Bruins (9) | |
| 1983 (1) | Division finals | April 24, 1983 | Boston Garden | Boston Bruins (10) | 3–2 (OT) | Buffalo Sabres (1) | |
| 1984 (1) | Division finals | April 22, 1984 | Met Center | Minnesota North Stars (5) | 4–3 (OT) | St. Louis Blues (4) | |
| 1984 (2) | Division finals | April 22, 1984 | Northlands Coliseum | Edmonton Oilers (1) | 7–4 | Calgary Flames (2) | |
| 1985 (1) | Division finals | May 2, 1985 | Montreal Forum | Quebec Nordiques (2) | 3–2 (OT)* | Montreal Canadiens (12) | |
| 1986 (1) | Division finals | April 29, 1986 | Montreal Forum | Montreal Canadiens (13) | 2–1 (OT) | Hartford Whalers (1) | |
| 1986 (2) | Division finals | April 30, 1986 | St. Louis Arena | St. Louis Blues (5) | 2–1 | Toronto Maple Leafs (10) | |
| 1986 (3) | Division finals | April 30, 1986 | Northlands Coliseum | Calgary Flames (3) | 3–2* | Edmonton Oilers (2) | |
| 1986 (4) | Conference finals | May 14, 1986 | Olympic Saddledome | Calgary Flames (4) | 2–1 | St. Louis Blues (6) | |
| 1987 (1) | Division semifinals | April 18, 1987 | Capital Centre | New York Islanders (4) | 3–2 (4OT)* | Washington Capitals (1) | |
| 1987 (2) | Division finals | May 2, 1987 | Montreal Forum | Montreal Canadiens (14) | 5–3 | Quebec Nordiques (3) | |
| 1987 (3) | Division finals | May 2, 1987 | Spectrum | Philadelphia Flyers (6) | 5–1 | New York Islanders (5) | |
| 1987 (4) | Division finals | May 3, 1987 | Joe Louis Arena | Detroit Red Wings (12) | 3–0 | Toronto Maple Leafs (11) | |
| 1987 (5) | Final | May 31, 1987 | Northlands Coliseum | Edmonton Oilers (3) | 3–1 | Philadelphia Flyers (7) | |
| 1988 (1) | Division semifinals | April 16, 1988 | Capital Centre | Washington Capitals (2) | 5–4 (OT) | Philadelphia Flyers (8) | |
| 1988 (2) | Division finals | April 30, 1988 | Capital Centre | New Jersey Devils (1) | 3–2* | Washington Capitals (3) | |
| 1988 (3) | Conference finals | May 14, 1988 | Boston Garden | Boston Bruins (11) | 6–2 | New Jersey Devils (2) | |
| 1989 (1) | Division semifinals | April 15, 1989 | Olympic Saddledome | Calgary Flames (5) | 4–3 (OT) | Vancouver Canucks (1) | |
| 1989 (2) | Division semifinals | April 15, 1989 | Great Western Forum | Los Angeles Kings (4) | 6–3 | Edmonton Oilers (4) | |
| 1989 (3) | Division finals | April 29, 1989 | Civic Arena | Philadelphia Flyers (9) | 4–1* | Pittsburgh Penguins (2) | |
| 1990 (1) | Division semifinals | April 16, 1990 | Chicago Stadium | Chicago Blackhawks (7) | 5–2 | Minnesota North Stars (6) | |
| 1990 (2) | Division semifinals | April 16, 1990 | Northlands Coliseum | Edmonton Oilers (5) | 4–1 | Winnipeg Jets (I) (1) | |
| 1990 (3) | Division semifinals | April 17, 1990 | Boston Garden | Boston Bruins (12) | 3–1 | Hartford Whalers (2) | |
| 1990 (4) | Division finals | April 30, 1990 | Chicago Stadium | Chicago Blackhawks (8) | 8–2 | St. Louis Blues (7) | |
| 1991 (1) | Division semifinals | April 15, 1991 | Civic Arena | Pittsburgh Penguins (3) | 4–0 | New Jersey Devils (3) | |
| 1991 (2) | Division semifinals | April 16, 1991 | St. Louis Arena | St. Louis Blues (8) | 3–2 | Detroit Red Wings (13) | |
| 1991 (3) | Division semifinals | April 16, 1991 | Olympic Saddledome | Edmonton Oilers (6) | 5–4 (OT)* | Calgary Flames (6) | |
| 1991 (4) | Division finals | April 29, 1991 | Boston Garden | Boston Bruins (13) | 2–1 | Montreal Canadiens (15) | |
| 1992 (1) | Division semifinals | April 30, 1992 | Joe Louis Arena | Detroit Red Wings (14) | 5–2 | Minnesota North Stars (7) | |
| 1992 (2) | Division semifinals | April 30, 1992 | Pacific Coliseum | Vancouver Canucks (2) | 5–0 | Winnipeg Jets (I) (2) | |
| 1992 (3) | Division semifinals | May 1, 1992 | Montreal Forum | Montreal Canadiens (16) | 3–2 (2OT) | Hartford Whalers (3) | |
| 1992 (4) | Division semifinals | May 1, 1992 | Boston Garden | Boston Bruins (14) | 3–2 | Buffalo Sabres (2) | |
| 1992 (5) | Division semifinals | May 1, 1992 | Madison Square Garden | New York Rangers (5) | 8–4 | New Jersey Devils (4) | |
| 1992 (6) | Division semifinals | May 1, 1992 | Capital Centre | Pittsburgh Penguins (4) | 3–1* | Washington Capitals (4) | |
| 1993 (1) | Division semifinals | May 1, 1993 | Joe Louis Arena | Toronto Maple Leafs (12) | 4–3 (OT)* | Detroit Red Wings (15) | |
| 1993 (2) | Division finals | May 14, 1993 | Civic Arena | New York Islanders (6) | 4–3 (OT)* | Pittsburgh Penguins (5) | |
| 1993 (3) | Division finals | May 15, 1993 | Maple Leaf Gardens | Toronto Maple Leafs (13) | 6–0 | St. Louis Blues (9) | |
| 1993 (4) | Conference finals | May 29, 1993 | Maple Leaf Gardens | Los Angeles Kings (5) | 5–4* | Toronto Maple Leafs (14) | |
| 1994 (1) | Conference quarterfinals | April 29, 1994 | Brendan Byrne Arena | New Jersey Devils (5) | 2–1 | Buffalo Sabres (3) | |
| 1994 (2) | Conference quarterfinals | April 29, 1994 | Boston Garden | Boston Bruins (15) | 5–3 | Montreal Canadiens (17) | |
| 1994 (3) | Conference quarterfinals | April 30, 1994 | Joe Louis Arena | San Jose Sharks (1) | 3–2* | Detroit Red Wings (16) | |
| 1994 (4) | Conference quarterfinals | April 30, 1994 | Olympic Saddledome | Vancouver Canucks (3) | 4–3 (2OT)* | Calgary Flames (7) | |
| 1994 (5) | Conference semifinals | May 14, 1994 | Maple Leaf Gardens | Toronto Maple Leafs (15) | 4–2 | San Jose Sharks (2) | |
| 1994 (6) | Conference finals | May 27, 1994 | Madison Square Garden | New York Rangers (6) | 2–1 (2OT) | New Jersey Devils (6) | |
| 1994 (7) | Final | June 14, 1994 | Madison Square Garden | New York Rangers (7) | 3–2 | Vancouver Canucks (4) | |
| 1995 (1) | Conference quarterfinals | May 18, 1995 | Civic Arena | Pittsburgh Penguins (6) | 3–0 | Washington Capitals (5) | |
| 1995 (2) | Conference quarterfinals | May 19, 1995 | United Center | Chicago Blackhawks (9) | 5–2 | Toronto Maple Leafs (16) | |
| 1995 (3) | Conference quarterfinals | May 19, 1995 | Kiel Center | Vancouver Canucks (5) | 5–3* | St. Louis Blues (10) | |
| 1995 (4) | Conference quarterfinals | May 19, 1995 | Olympic Saddledome | San Jose Sharks (3) | 5–4 (2OT)* | Calgary Flames (8) | |
| 1996 (1) | Conference semifinals | May 16, 1996 | Joe Louis Arena | Detroit Red Wings (17) | 1–0 (2OT) | St. Louis Blues (11) | |
| 1996 (2) | Conference finals | June 1, 1996 | Civic Arena | Florida Panthers (1) | 3–1* | Pittsburgh Penguins (7) | |
| 1997 (1) | Conference quarterfinals | April 29, 1997 | Marine Midland Arena | Buffalo Sabres (4) | 3–2 (OT) | Ottawa Senators (1) | |
| 1997 (2) | Conference quarterfinals | April 29, 1997 | Reunion Arena | Edmonton Oilers (7) | 4–3 (OT)* | Dallas Stars (8) | |
| 1997 (3) | Conference quarterfinals | April 29, 1997 | Arrowhead Pond of Anaheim | Mighty Ducks of Anaheim (1) | 3–0 | Phoenix Coyotes (3) | |
| 1998 (1) | Conference quarterfinals | May 4, 1998 | McNichols Sports Arena | Edmonton Oilers (8) | 4–0* | Colorado Avalanche (4) | |
| 1999 (1) | Conference quarterfinals | May 4, 1999 | Continental Airlines Arena | Pittsburgh Penguins (8) | 4–2* | New Jersey Devils (7) | |
| 1999 (2) | Conference quarterfinals | May 4, 1999 | America West Arena | St. Louis Blues (12) | 1–0 (OT)* | Phoenix Coyotes (4) | |
| 1999 (3) | Conference finals | June 4, 1999 | Reunion Arena | Dallas Stars (9) | 4–1 | Colorado Avalanche (5) | |
| 2000 (1) | Conference quarterfinals | April 25, 2000 | Kiel Center | San Jose Sharks (4) | 3–1* | St. Louis Blues (13) | |
| 2000 (2) | Conference finals | May 26, 2000 | First Union Center | New Jersey Devils (8) | 2–1* | Philadelphia Flyers (10) | |
| 2000 (3) | Conference finals | May 27, 2000 | Reunion Arena | Dallas Stars (10) | 3–2 | Colorado Avalanche (6) | |
| 2001 (1) | Conference semifinals | May 9, 2001 | Continental Airlines Arena | New Jersey Devils (9) | 5–1 | Toronto Maple Leafs (17) | |
| 2001 (2) | Conference semifinals | May 9, 2001 | Pepsi Center | Colorado Avalanche (7) | 5–1 | Los Angeles Kings (6) | |
| 2001 (3) | Conference semifinals | May 10, 2001 | HSBC Arena | Pittsburgh Penguins (9) | 3–2 (OT)* | Buffalo Sabres (5) | |
| 2001 (4) | Final | June 9, 2001 | Pepsi Center | Colorado Avalanche (8) | 3–1 | New Jersey Devils (10) | |
| 2002 (1) | Conference quarterfinals | April 29, 2002 | Pepsi Center | Colorado Avalanche (9) | 4–0 | Los Angeles Kings (7) | |
| 2002 (2) | Conference quarterfinals | April 30, 2002 | Air Canada Centre | Toronto Maple Leafs (18) | 4–2 | New York Islanders (7) | |
| 2002 (3) | Conference semifinals | May 14, 2002 | Air Canada Centre | Toronto Maple Leafs (19) | 3–0 | Ottawa Senators (2) | |
| 2002 (4) | Conference semifinals | May 15, 2002 | Pepsi Center | Colorado Avalanche (10) | 1–0 | San Jose Sharks (5) | |
| 2002 (5) | Conference finals | May 31, 2002 | Joe Louis Arena | Detroit Red Wings (18) | 7–0 | Colorado Avalanche (11) | |
| 2003 (1) | Conference quarterfinals | April 22, 2003 | First Union Center | Philadelphia Flyers (11) | 6–1 | Toronto Maple Leafs (20) | |
| 2003 (2) | Conference quarterfinals | April 22, 2003 | Pepsi Center | Minnesota Wild (1) | 3–2 (OT)* | Colorado Avalanche (12) | |
| 2003 (3) | Conference quarterfinals | April 22, 2003 | GM Place | Vancouver Canucks (6) | 4–1 | St. Louis Blues (14) | |
| 2003 (4) | Conference semifinals | May 8, 2003 | GM Place | Minnesota Wild (2) | 4–2* | Vancouver Canucks (7) | |
| 2003 (5) | Conference finals | May 23, 2003 | Corel Centre | New Jersey Devils (11) | 3–2* | Ottawa Senators (3) | |
| 2003 (6) | Final | June 9, 2003 | Continental Airlines Arena | New Jersey Devils (12) | 3–0 | Mighty Ducks of Anaheim (2) | |
| 2004 (1) | Conference quarterfinals | April 19, 2004 | FleetCenter | Montreal Canadiens (18) | 2–0* | Boston Bruins (16) | |
| 2004 (2) | Conference quarterfinals | April 19, 2004 | GM Place | Calgary Flames (9) | 3–2 (OT)* | Vancouver Canucks (8) | |
| 2004 (3) | Conference quarterfinals | April 20, 2004 | Air Canada Centre | Toronto Maple Leafs (21) | 4–1 | Ottawa Senators (4) | |
| 2004 (4) | Conference finals | May 22, 2004 | St. Pete Times Forum | Tampa Bay Lightning (1) | 2–1 | Philadelphia Flyers (12) | |
| 2004 (5) | Final | June 7, 2004 | St. Pete Times Forum | Tampa Bay Lightning (2) | 2–1 | Calgary Flames (10) | |
| 2006 (1) | Conference quarterfinals | May 3, 2006 | Pengrowth Saddledome | Mighty Ducks of Anaheim (3) | 3–0* | Calgary Flames (11) | |
| 2006 (2) | Conference finals | June 1, 2006 | RBC Center | Carolina Hurricanes (4) | 4–2 | Buffalo Sabres (6) | |
| 2006 (3) | Final | June 19, 2006 | RBC Center | Carolina Hurricanes (5) | 3–1 | Edmonton Oilers (9) | |
| 2007 (1) | Conference quarterfinals | April 23, 2007 | GM Place | Vancouver Canucks (9) | 4–1 | Dallas Stars (11) | |
| 2008 (1) | Conference quarterfinals | April 21, 2008 | Bell Centre | Montreal Canadiens (19) | 5–0 | Boston Bruins (17) | |
| 2008 (2) | Conference quarterfinals | April 22, 2008 | Verizon Center | Philadelphia Flyers (13) | 3–2 (OT)* | Washington Capitals (6) | |
| 2008 (3) | Conference quarterfinals | April 22, 2008 | HP Pavilion at San Jose | San Jose Sharks (6) | 5–3 | Calgary Flames (12) | |
| 2009 (1) | Conference quarterfinals | April 28, 2009 | Verizon Center | Washington Capitals (7) | 2–1 | New York Rangers (8) | |
| 2009 (2) | Conference quarterfinals | April 28, 2009 | Prudential Center | Carolina Hurricanes (6) | 4–3* | New Jersey Devils (13) | |
| 2009 (3) | Conference semifinals | May 13, 2009 | Verizon Center | Pittsburgh Penguins (10) | 6–2* | Washington Capitals (8) | |
| 2009 (4) | Conference semifinals | May 14, 2009 | Joe Louis Arena | Detroit Red Wings (19) | 4–3 | Anaheim Ducks (4) | |
| 2009 (5) | Conference semifinals | May 14, 2009 | TD Banknorth Garden | Carolina Hurricanes (7) | 3–2 (OT)* | Boston Bruins (18) | |
| 2009 (6) | Final | June 12, 2009 | Joe Louis Arena | Pittsburgh Penguins (11) | 2–1* | Detroit Red Wings (20) | |
| 2010 (1) | Conference quarterfinals | April 27, 2010 | Jobing.com Arena | Detroit Red Wings (21) | 6–1* | Phoenix Coyotes (5) | |
| 2010 (2) | Conference quarterfinals | April 28, 2010 | Verizon Center | Montreal Canadiens (20) | 2–1* | Washington Capitals (9) | |
| 2010 (3) | Conference semifinals | May 12, 2010 | Mellon Arena | Montreal Canadiens (21) | 5–2* | Pittsburgh Penguins (12) | |
| 2010 (4) | Conference semifinals | May 14, 2010 | TD Garden | Philadelphia Flyers (14)† | 4–3* | Boston Bruins (19) | |
| 2011 (1) | Conference quarterfinals | April 26, 2011 | Wells Fargo Center | Philadelphia Flyers (15) | 5–2 | Buffalo Sabres (7) | |
| 2011 (2) | Conference quarterfinals | April 26, 2011 | Rogers Arena | Vancouver Canucks (10) | 2–1 (OT) | Chicago Blackhawks (10)§ | |
| 2011 (3) | Conference quarterfinals | April 27, 2011 | TD Garden | Boston Bruins (20) | 4–3 (OT) | Montreal Canadiens (22) | |
| 2011 (4) | Conference quarterfinals | April 27, 2011 | Consol Energy Center | Tampa Bay Lightning (3) | 1–0* | Pittsburgh Penguins (13) | |
| 2011 (5) | Conference semifinals | May 12, 2011 | HP Pavilion at San Jose | San Jose Sharks (7) | 3–2 | Detroit Red Wings (22)§ | |
| 2011 (6) | Conference finals | May 27, 2011 | TD Garden | Boston Bruins (21) | 1–0 | Tampa Bay Lightning (4) | |
| 2011 (7) | Final | June 15, 2011 | Rogers Arena | Boston Bruins (22) | 4–0* | Vancouver Canucks (11) | |
| 2012 (1) | Conference quarterfinals | April 25, 2012 | TD Garden | Washington Capitals (10) | 2–1 (OT)* | Boston Bruins (23) | |
| 2012 (2) | Conference quarterfinals | April 26, 2012 | Madison Square Garden | New York Rangers (9) | 2–1 | Ottawa Senators (5) | |
| 2012 (3) | Conference quarterfinals | April 26, 2012 | BankAtlantic Center | New Jersey Devils (14) | 3–2 (2OT)* | Florida Panthers (2) | |
| 2012 (4) | Conference semifinals | May 12, 2012 | Madison Square Garden | New York Rangers (10) | 2–1 | Washington Capitals (11) | |
| 2013 (1) | Conference quarterfinals | May 12, 2013 | Honda Center | Detroit Red Wings (23) | 3–2* | Anaheim Ducks (5) | |
| 2013 (2) | Conference quarterfinals | May 13, 2013 | TD Garden | Boston Bruins (24) | 5–4 (OT) | Toronto Maple Leafs (22) | |
| 2013 (3) | Conference quarterfinals | May 13, 2013 | Verizon Center | New York Rangers (11) | 5–0* | Washington Capitals (12) | |
| 2013 (4) | Conference semifinals | May 28, 2013 | Staples Center | Los Angeles Kings (8) | 2–1 | San Jose Sharks (8) | |
| 2013 (5) | Conference semifinals | May 29, 2013 | United Center | Chicago Blackhawks (11) | 2–1 (OT) | Detroit Red Wings (24) | |
| 2014 (1) | First round | April 30, 2014 | Madison Square Garden | New York Rangers (12) | 2–1 | Philadelphia Flyers (16) | |
| 2014 (2) | First round | April 30, 2014 | Pepsi Center | Minnesota Wild (3) | 5–4 (OT)* | Colorado Avalanche (13) | |
| 2014 (3) | First round | April 30, 2014 | SAP Center at San Jose | Los Angeles Kings (9)† | 5–1* | San Jose Sharks (9) | |
| 2014 (4) | Second round | May 13, 2014 | Consol Energy Center | New York Rangers (13) | 2–1* | Pittsburgh Penguins (14) | |
| 2014 (5) | Second round | May 14, 2014 | TD Garden | Montreal Canadiens (23) | 3–1* | Boston Bruins (25) | |
| 2014 (6) | Second round | May 16, 2014 | Honda Center | Los Angeles Kings (10) | 6–2* | Anaheim Ducks (6) | |
| 2014 (7) | Conference finals | June 1, 2014 | United Center | Los Angeles Kings (11) | 5–4 (OT)* | Chicago Blackhawks (12) | |
| 2015 (1) | First round | April 27, 2015 | Verizon Center | Washington Capitals (13) | 2–1 | New York Islanders (8) | |
| 2015 (2) | First round | April 29, 2015 | Amalie Arena | Tampa Bay Lightning (5) | 2–0 | Detroit Red Wings (25) | |
| 2015 (3) | Second round | May 13, 2015 | Madison Square Garden | New York Rangers (14) | 2–1 (OT) | Washington Capitals (14) | |
| 2015 (4) | Conference finals | May 29, 2015 | Madison Square Garden | Tampa Bay Lightning (6) | 2–0* | New York Rangers (15) | |
| 2015 (5) | Conference finals | May 30, 2015 | Honda Center | Chicago Blackhawks (13) | 5–3* | Anaheim Ducks (7) | |
| 2016 (1) | First round | April 25, 2016 | Scottrade Center | St. Louis Blues (15) | 3–2 | Chicago Blackhawks (14) | |
| 2016 (2) | First round | April 27, 2016 | Honda Center | Nashville Predators (1) | 2–1* | Anaheim Ducks (8) | |
| 2016 (3) | Second round | May 11, 2016 | American Airlines Center | St. Louis Blues (16) | 6–1* | Dallas Stars (12) | |
| 2016 (4) | Second round | May 12, 2016 | SAP Center at San Jose | San Jose Sharks (10) | 5–0 | Nashville Predators (2) | |
| 2016 (5) | Conference finals | May 26, 2016 | Consol Energy Center | Pittsburgh Penguins (15) | 2–1 | Tampa Bay Lightning (7) | |
| 2017 (1) | Second round | May 10, 2017 | Verizon Center | Pittsburgh Penguins (16) | 2–0* | Washington Capitals (15) | |
| 2017 (2) | Second round | May 10, 2017 | Honda Center | Anaheim Ducks (9) | 2–1 | Edmonton Oilers (10) | |
| 2017 (3) | Conference finals | May 25, 2017 | PPG Paints Arena | Pittsburgh Penguins (17) | 3–2 (2OT) | Ottawa Senators (6) | |
| 2018 (1) | First round | April 25, 2018 | TD Garden | Boston Bruins (26) | 7–4 | Toronto Maple Leafs (23) | |
| 2018 (2) | Second round | May 10, 2018 | Bridgestone Arena | Winnipeg Jets (II) (1) | 5–1* | Nashville Predators (3) | |
| 2018 (3) | Conference finals | May 23, 2018 | Amalie Arena | Washington Capitals (16) | 4–0* | Tampa Bay Lightning (8) | |
| 2019 (1) | First round | April 23, 2019 | TD Garden | Boston Bruins (27) | 5–1 | Toronto Maple Leafs (24) | |
| 2019 (2) | First round | April 23, 2019 | SAP Center at San Jose | San Jose Sharks (11) | 5–4 (OT) | Vegas Golden Knights (1) | |
| 2019 (3) | First round | April 24, 2019 | Capital One Arena | Carolina Hurricanes (8) | 4–3 (2OT)* | Washington Capitals (17) | |
| 2019 (4) | Second round | May 7, 2019 | Enterprise Center | St. Louis Blues (17) | 2–1 (2OT) | Dallas Stars (13) | |
| 2019 (5) | Second round | May 8, 2019 | SAP Center at San Jose | San Jose Sharks (12) | 3–2 | Colorado Avalanche (14) | |
| 2019 (6) | Final | June 12, 2019 | TD Garden | St. Louis Blues (18) | 4–1* | Boston Bruins (28) | |
| 2020 (1) | Second round | September 4, 2020 | Rogers Place∞ | Dallas Stars (14) | 5–4 (OT)* | Colorado Avalanche (15) | |
| 2020 (2) | Second round | September 4, 2020 | Rogers Place∞ | Vegas Golden Knights (2) | 3–0 | Vancouver Canucks (12) | |
| 2020 (3) | Second round | September 5, 2020 | Scotiabank Arena∞ | New York Islanders (9) | 4–0* | Philadelphia Flyers (17) | |
| 2021 (1) | First round | May 28, 2021 | T-Mobile Arena | Vegas Golden Knights (3) | 6–2 | Minnesota Wild (4) | |
| 2021 (2) | First round | May 31, 2021 | Scotiabank Arena | Montreal Canadiens (24) | 3–1* | Toronto Maple Leafs (25) | |
| 2021 (3) | Semifinals | June 25, 2021 | Amalie Arena | Tampa Bay Lightning (9) | 1–0 | New York Islanders (10) | |
| 2022 (1) | First round | May 14, 2022 | PNC Arena | Carolina Hurricanes (9) | 3–2 | Boston Bruins (29) | |
| 2022 (2) | First round | May 14, 2022 | Scotiabank Arena | Tampa Bay Lightning (10) | 2–1* | Toronto Maple Leafs (26) | |
| 2022 (3) | First round | May 14, 2022 | Rogers Place | Edmonton Oilers (11) | 2–0 | Los Angeles Kings (12) | |
| 2022 (4) | First round | May 15, 2022 | Madison Square Garden | New York Rangers (16) | 4–3 (OT) | Pittsburgh Penguins (18) | |
| 2022 (5) | First round | May 15, 2022 | Scotiabank Saddledome | Calgary Flames (13) | 3–2 (OT) | Dallas Stars (15) | |
| 2022 (6) | Second round | May 30, 2022 | PNC Arena | New York Rangers (17) | 6–2* | Carolina Hurricanes (10) | |
| 2023 (1) | First round | April 30, 2023 | TD Garden | Florida Panthers (3) | 4–3 (OT)* | Boston Bruins (30) | |
| 2023 (2) | First round | April 30, 2023 | Ball Arena | Seattle Kraken (1) | 2–1* | Colorado Avalanche (16) | |
| 2023 (3) | First round | May 1, 2023 | Prudential Center | New Jersey Devils (15) | 4–0 | New York Rangers (18) | |
| 2023 (4) | Second round | May 15, 2023 | American Airlines Center | Dallas Stars (16) | 2–1 | Seattle Kraken (2) | |
| 2024 (1) | First round | May 4, 2024 | TD Garden | Boston Bruins (31) | 2–1 (OT) | Toronto Maple Leafs (27) | |
| 2024 (2) | First round | May 5, 2024 | American Airlines Center | Dallas Stars (17) | 2–1 | Vegas Golden Knights (4) | |
| 2024 (3) | Second round | May 20, 2024 | Rogers Arena | Edmonton Oilers (12) | 3–2* | Vancouver Canucks (13) | |
| 2024 (4) | Final | June 24, 2024 | Amerant Bank Arena | Florida Panthers (4) | 2–1 | Edmonton Oilers (13)§ | |
| 2025 (1) | First round | May 3, 2025 | American Airlines Center | Dallas Stars (18) | 4–2 | Colorado Avalanche (17) | |
| 2025 (2) | First round | May 4, 2025 | Canada Life Centre | Winnipeg Jets (2) | 4–3 (2OT) | St. Louis Blues (19) | |
| 2025 (3) | Second round | May 18, 2025 | Scotiabank Arena | Florida Panthers (5) | 6–1* | Toronto Maple Leafs (28) | |
| 2026 (1) | First round | May 3, 2026 | Benchmark International Arena | Montreal Canadiens (25) | 2–1* | Tampa Bay Lightning (11) | |
| 2026 (2) | Second round | May 18, 2026 | KeyBank Center | Montreal Canadiens (26) | 3–2* (OT) | Buffalo Sabres (8) | |

== All-time standings ==
| Team | Games played | Wins | Losses | Win–loss % |
|---|---|---|---|---|
| Boston Bruins | 31 | 16 | 15 | .516 |
| Toronto Maple Leafs | 28 | 12 | 16 | .429 |
| Detroit Red Wings | 25 | 14 | 11 | .560 |
| Montreal Canadiens | 26 | 17 | 9 | .654 |
| St. Louis Blues | 19 | 10 | 9 | .526 |
| New York Rangers | 18 | 11 | 7 | .611 |
| Pittsburgh Penguins | 18 | 10 | 8 | .556 |
| Minnesota North Stars / Dallas Stars | 18 | 9 | 9 | .500 |
| Philadelphia Flyers | 17 | 9 | 8 | .529 |
| Quebec Nordiques / Colorado Avalanche | 17 | 6 | 11 | .353 |
| Washington Capitals | 17 | 5 | 12 | .294 |
| New Jersey Devils | 15 | 8 | 7 | .533 |
| Chicago Black Hawks / Blackhawks | 14 | 7 | 7 | .500 |
| Edmonton Oilers | 13 | 8 | 5 | .615 |
| Calgary Flames | 13 | 6 | 7 | .462 |
| Vancouver Canucks | 13 | 6 | 7 | .462 |
| San Jose Sharks | 12 | 8 | 4 | .667 |
| Los Angeles Kings | 12 | 7 | 5 | .583 |
| Tampa Bay Lightning | 11 | 7 | 4 | .636 |
| Hartford Whalers / Carolina Hurricanes | 10 | 6 | 4 | .600 |
| New York Islanders | 10 | 4 | 6 | .400 |
| Mighty Ducks of Anaheim / Anaheim Ducks | 9 | 3 | 6 | .333 |
| Buffalo Sabres | 7 | 1 | 6 | .143 |
| Ottawa Senators | 6 | 0 | 6 | .000 |
| Florida Panthers | 5 | 4 | 1 | .800 |
| Winnipeg Jets (I) / Phoenix/Arizona Coyotes (inactive) | 5 | 0 | 5 | .000 |
| Minnesota Wild | 4 | 3 | 1 | .750 |
| Vegas Golden Knights | 4 | 2 | 2 | .500 |
| Nashville Predators | 3 | 1 | 2 | .333 |
| Winnipeg Jets (II) | 2 | 2 | 0 | 1.000 |
| Seattle Kraken | 2 | 1 | 1 | .500 |
| Oakland Seals (defunct) | 1 | 0 | 1 | .000 |
Note: Teams that have never played a game seven are excluded. Names of franchises before their relocation are also shown.

== Recurring game seven matchups ==
(*) – Number of overtime periods played in the seventh game.

| Count | Matchup | Record | Years played |
|---|---|---|---|
| 9 | Boston Bruins vs. Montreal Canadiens | Canadiens, 6–3 | 1952, 1971, 1979*, 1991, 1994, 2004, 2008, 2011*, 2014 |
| 6 | Boston Bruins vs. Toronto Maple Leafs | Bruins, 5–1 | 1941, 1959, 2013*, 2018, 2019, 2024* |
| 6 | Detroit Red Wings vs. Toronto Maple Leafs | Maple Leafs, 4–2 | 1942, 1945, 1950*, 1964, 1987, 1993* |
| 5 | Dallas Stars/ Minnesota North Stars vs. St. Louis Blues | Blues, 4–1 | 1968**, 1972*, 1984*, 2016, 2019** |
| 4 | Pittsburgh Penguins vs. Washington Capitals | Penguins, 4–0 | 1992, 1995, 2009, 2017 |
| 4 | Colorado Avalanche vs. Dallas Stars | Stars, 4–0 | 1999, 2000, 2020*, 2025 |
| 4 | New York Rangers vs. Washington Capitals | Rangers, 3–1 | 2009, 2012, 2013, 2015* |
| 3 | Detroit Red Wings vs. Montreal Canadiens | Red Wings, 3–0 | 1949, 1954*, 1955 |
| 3 | Chicago Blackhawks/ Black Hawks vs. Montreal Canadiens | Canadiens, 3–0 | 1953, 1965, 1971 |
| 3 | Chicago Blackhawks/ Black Hawks vs. Detroit Red Wings | Blackhawks, 2–1 | 1964, 1965, 2013* |
| 3 | New York Islanders vs. Philadelphia Flyers | Flyers, 2–1 | 1975, 1987, 2020 |
| 3 | Calgary Flames vs. Edmonton Oilers | Oilers, 2–1 | 1984, 1986, 1991* |
| 3 | Calgary Flames vs. Vancouver Canucks | Flames, 2–1 | 1989*, 1994**, 2004* |
| 3 | New Jersey Devils vs. New York Rangers | Rangers, 2–1 | 1992, 1994**, 2023 |
| 3 | Boston Bruins vs. Carolina Hurricanes/ Hartford Whalers | Hurricanes, 2–1 | 1990, 2009*, 2022 |
| 2 | Montreal Canadiens vs. Toronto Maple Leafs | Tie, 1–1 | 1964, 2021 |
| 2 | New York Rangers vs. Philadelphia Flyers | Tie, 1–1 | 1974, 2014 |
| 2 | New York Islanders vs. Pittsburgh Penguins | Islanders, 2–0 | 1975, 1993* |
| 2 | Philadelphia Flyers vs. Toronto Maple Leafs | Flyers, 2–0 | 1976, 2003 |
| 2 | New York Islanders vs. Toronto Maple Leafs | Maple Leafs, 2–0 | 1978*, 2002 |
| 2 | Boston Bruins vs. Buffalo Sabres | Bruins, 2–0 | 1983*, 1992 |
| 2 | Colorado Avalanche/ Quebec Nordiques vs. Montreal Canadiens | Tie, 1–1 | 1985*, 1987 |
| 2 | Carolina Hurricanes/ Hartford Whalers vs. Montreal Canadiens | Canadiens, 2–0 | 1986*, 1992** |
| 2 | St. Louis Blues vs. Toronto Maple Leafs | Tie, 1–1 | 1986, 1993 |
| 2 | New York Islanders vs. Washington Capitals | Tie, 1–1 | 1987****, 2015 |
| 2 | Philadelphia Flyers vs. Washington Capitals | Tie, 1–1 | 1988*, 2008* |
| 2 | Chicago Blackhawks vs. St. Louis Blues | Tie, 1–1 | 1990, 2016 |
| 2 | Detroit Red Wings vs. St. Louis Blues | Tie, 1–1 | 1991, 1996** |
| 2 | New Jersey Devils vs. Pittsburgh Penguins | Penguins, 2–0 | 1991, 1999 |
| 2 | Detroit Red Wings vs. San Jose Sharks | Sharks, 2–0 | 1994, 2011 |
| 2 | Calgary Flames vs. San Jose Sharks | Sharks, 2–0 | 1995**, 2008 |
| 2 | St. Louis Blues vs. Vancouver Canucks | Canucks, 2–0 | 1995, 2003 |
| 2 | Colorado Avalanche vs. Los Angeles Kings | Avalanche, 2–0 | 2001, 2002 |
| 2 | Colorado Avalanche vs. San Jose Sharks | Tie, 1–1 | 2002, 2019 |
| 2 | Ottawa Senators vs. Toronto Maple Leafs | Maple Leafs, 2–0 | 2002, 2004 |
| 2 | Colorado Avalanche vs. Minnesota Wild | Wild, 2–0 | 2003*, 2014* |
| 2 | Anaheim Ducks vs. Detroit Red Wings | Red Wings, 2–0 | 2009, 2013 |
| 2 | Pittsburgh Penguins vs. Tampa Bay Lightning | Tie, 1–1 | 2011, 2016 |
| 2 | Los Angeles Kings vs. San Jose Sharks | Kings, 2–0 | 2013, 2014 |
| 2 | Edmonton Oilers vs. Los Angeles Kings | Tie, 1–1 | 1989, 2022 |
| 2 | New York Rangers vs. Pittsburgh Penguins | Rangers, 2–0 | 2014, 2022* |
