= 1967–68 Los Angeles Kings season =

National Hockey League team season

1967–68 Los Angeles Kings
- Division: 2nd West
- 1967–68 record: 31–33–10
- Home record: 20–13–4
- Road record: 11–20–6
- Goals for: 200
- Goals against: 224

Team information
- General manager: Larry Regan
- Coach: Red Kelly
- Captain: Bob Wall
- Alternate captains: Bill White; Eddie Joyal
- Arena: Long Beach Arena, Los Angeles Memorial Sports Arena, Los Angeles Forum
- Average attendance: 8,084
- Minor league affiliate: Springfield Indians (AHL)

Team leaders
- Goals: Bill Flett (26)
- Assists: Eddie Joyal (34)
- Points: Eddie Joyal (57)
- Penalty minutes: Dave Amadio (101)
- Wins: Wayne Rutledge (20)
- Goals against average: Wayne Rutledge (2.87)

The 1967–68 Los Angeles Kings season was the first season for the Kings in the National Hockey League (NHL). The Kings qualified for the Stanley Cup playoffs but lost in their first playoff series.

== Offseason ==
The Kings were one of six expansion teams, which doubled the size of the league from six to twelve. While the expected favorite bid in Los Angeles was by Dan Reeves, owner of the Western Hockey League's Los Angeles Blades and the NFL's Los Angeles Rams, the league instead awarded a franchise to Jack Kent Cooke, a Canadian who also owned the National Basketball Association's Los Angeles Lakers. The Kings were placed in the newly established West Division, along with the other expansion teams: the California Seals, Minnesota North Stars, Philadelphia Flyers, Pittsburgh Penguins and St. Louis Blues.

Prior to the 1967 NHL expansion draft, Cooke arranged a deal with Toronto Maple Leafs left wing Red Kelly, who as a player holds the distinction of playing on the most Stanley Cup championship teams without any of them including time in Montreal, and was set for his retirement, to become the Kings' first head coach. During the draft, the Kings picked goaltenders Terry Sawchuk and Wayne Rutledge with their first picks, and once Maple Leafs' general manager Punch Imlach decided to put Kelly on the protected list on the tenth round, Cooke was forced to send one of his picks, Ken Block, in exchange for his future coach. To not rely only on the draft, Cooke purchased the American Hockey League's Springfield Indians for $1 million to bolster the Kings roster. Long-time Indians player Brian Kilrea would score the Kings' first goal.

Cooke invested heavily on promoting his team, inviting Hollywood stars to the arena, and creating nicknames for most players which he required play-by-play announcer Jiggs McDonald to employ in broadcasts. Still, conditions were chaotic. For the first preseason practice in California, The Smothers Brothers Comedy Hour producer Saul Ilson had to bring a puck from his Hollywood office for the Kings to play, as the team's own were unreachable in storage.

== Regular season ==
The Kings played their home games in three locations during that inaugural campaign. Before the brand new arena built by Cooke and known as The Forum would become their permanent home, the team played their first two games at the Long Beach Arena, and 14 more at the Los Angeles Memorial Sports Arena . The season opener was against fellow expansion Philadelphia Flyers, a 4–2 victory in Long Beach. While the Inglewood arena was being finished, the Kings struggled to attract consistent crowds, with sellouts only when the "Original Six" visited. The team still played well, only losing on the sixth game, and in the previous one winning their first confrontation against an Original Six team when visiting the Chicago Black Hawks.

The Forum was opened on December 30, and in the Kings' first game ever there, they lost 2–0 to the Philadelphia Flyers, to their largest crowd that far of 14,366 spectators. Given that aside from California Seals the closest team from Los Angeles were the St. Louis Blues, the Kings had to endure long road trips for away games. A new arena led to bigger and more consistent crowds, with the average of 6,045 tickets in the first 16 games rising to 9,725 at the Forum, for combined totals of 8,037 across the 37 home games. Original Six teams still brought larger audiences, with an average of 12,560 fans compared to the 7,432 when receiving fellow expansion teams. The Kings were predicted by writers to finish last in the new West Division. Surprisingly, the Kings finished second, just one point behind the Flyers. The division lead was taken by the Kings with four games remaining once they beat Philadelphia at The Forum, but Los Angeles slipped down one position by failing to win the final three games. The Kings had the best record of any of the expansion teams against the "Original Six", going a respectable 10–12–2, including winning their first two games ever against the legendary Montreal Canadiens. The home record of the Kings was 20–13–4 in their 37 home games spread over 3 arenas. On the road, Los Angeles posted a record of just 11–20–6.

The goaltending tandem of future hall of famer Terry Sawchuk and Wayne Rutledge allowed the team to stay in most games. The roster invested heavily on depth, with eight players having at least 25 points, and four scoring at least 18 goals. The leaders were Bill Flett, who scored 26 goals, while Eddie Joyal scored 23 goals, adding 34 assists for 57 points and was the second leading scorer in the West Division. Defenseman Bill White had 11 goals and 38 points, and had the second most penalty minutes with 100, just one behind Dave Amadio.

== Playoffs ==
The Kings faced off against the Minnesota North Stars in their first-ever playoff series. Although the Kings had home-ice advantage, the North Stars won the best-of-seven series 4–3. Los Angeles got the first two games at the Forum, lost twice in Minnesota, and had a close 3–2 victory on Game 5 to retain the lead. Afterwards, the North Stars won in overtime to force a Game 7 and dominated at the Forum with a 9–4 win. Doug Robinson and Lowell MacDonald led all Kings playoff scorers with seven points, while Eddie Joyal and Gord Labossiere had five points each.

== Season standings ==
West Division
		GP	W	L	T	GF	GA	DIFF	Pts
1	Philadelphia Flyers	74	31	32	11	173	179	−6	73
2	Los Angeles Kings	74	31	33	10	200	224	−24	72
3	St. Louis Blues	74	27	31	16	177	191	−14	70
4	Minnesota North Stars	74	27	32	15	191	226	−35	69
5	Pittsburgh Penguins	74	27	34	13	195	216	−21	67
6	Oakland Seals	74	15	42	17	153	219	−66	47

=== Record vs. opponents ===
==== Vs. West Division ====
1967–68 NHL records
Team	LAK	MIN	OAK	PHI	PIT	STL	Total
Los Angeles	—	2–6–2	4–4–2	5–4–1	6–4	4–3–3	21–21–8
Minnesota	6–2–2	—	5–2–3	3–6–1	3–4–3	3–5–2	20–19–11
Oakland	4–4–2	2–5–3	—	4–3–3	1–5–4	0–7–3	11–24–15
Philadelphia	4–5–1	6–3–1	3–4–3	—	3–4–3	7–1–2	23–17–10
Pittsburgh	4–6	4–3–3	5–1–4	4–3–3	—	4–6	21–19–10
St. Louis	3–4–3	5–3–2	7–0–3	1–7–2	6–4	—	22–18–10

==== Vs. East Division ====
1967–68 NHL records
Team	BOS	CHI	DET	MTL	NYR	TOR	Total
Los Angeles	1–3	1–2–1	2–1–1	2–2	2–2	2–2	10–12–2
Minnesota	2–2	1–3	2–2	1–2–1	0–2–2	1–2–1	7–13–4
Oakland	2–2	0–3–1	0–3–1	1–3	0–4	1–3	4–18–2
Philadelphia	1–3	1–3	1–3	1–2–1	1–3	3–1	8–15–1
Pittsburgh	2–2	1–2–1	1–3	0–4	0–3–1	2–1–1	6–15–3
St. Louis	1–2–1	0–2–2	1–2–1	0–3–1	1–3	2–1–1	5–13–6

== Schedule and results ==
1967–68 regular season
October

Game	Date	Opponent	Score	Location/attendance	Record
1	14	Philadelphia Flyers	4–2	Long Beach (7,023)	1–0-0
2	15	Minnesota North Stars	5–3	Long Beach (4,289)	2–0-0
3	18	California Seals	2–2	Oakland (3,419)	2-0–1
4	21	St. Louis Blues	3–3	St. Louis (7,127)	2-0–2
5	22	Chicago Black Hawks	5–3	Chicago (16,666)	3–0-2
6	25	Toronto Maple Leafs	2–4	Toronto (15,698)	3–1–2
7	26	Boston Bruins	0–2	Boston (12,973)	3–2–2
8	28	Pittsburgh Penguins	5–3	Pittsburgh (6,536)	4–2-2
9	31	New York Rangers	1–6	Memorial Sports Arena (6,455)	4–3–2

November

Game	Date	Opponent	Score	Location/attendance	Record
10	2	Chicago Black Hawks	1–3	Memorial Sports Arena (8,012)	4–4–2
11	4	Minnesota North Stars	2–2	Minnesota (10,246)	4-4–3
12	5	Detroit Red Wings	6–4	Detroit (12,164)	5–4-3
13	7	California Seals	5–4	Memorial Sports Arena (5,194)	6–4-3
14	9	Toronto Maple Leafs	4–1	Memorial Sports Arena (9,604)	7–4-3
15	15	California Seals	1–4	Oakland (3,256)	7–5–3
16	17	Detroit Red Wings	1–4	Memorial Sports Arena (9,498)	7–6–3
17	19	Montreal Canadiens	4–2	Memorial Sports Arena (9,849)	8–6-3
18	22	California Seals	3–1	Memorial Sports Arena (5,301)	9–6-3
19	24	Pittsburgh Penguins	5–3	Memorial Sports Arena (6,458)	10–6-3
20	26	Philadelphia Flyers	2–7	Philadelphia (11,420)	10–7–3
21	29	St. Louis Blues	2–3	St. Louis (5,583)	10–8–3

December

Game	Date	Opponent	Score	Location/attendance	Record
22	2	Montreal Canadiens	3–2	Montreal (14,584)	11–8-3
23	3	New York Rangers	2–4	New York (14,012)	11–9–3
24	6	St. Louis Blues	3–2	Long Beach (4,323)	12–9-3
25	8	Philadelphia Flyers	0–3	Long Beach (4,624)	12–10–3
26	10	Boston Bruins	3–1	Boston (13,409)	13–10-3
27	13	Minnesota North Stars	0–4	Minnesota (7,749)	13–11–3
28	15	Minnesota North Stars	0–3	Long Beach (7,149)	13–12–3
29	16	Boston Bruins	2–5	Long Beach (6,510)	13–13–3
30	19	Oakland Seals	3–1	Memorial Sports Arena (4,505)	14–13-3
31	21	Pittsburgh Penguins	4–1	Memorial Sports Arena (4,013)	15–13-3
32	23	St. Louis Blues	4–0	Memorial Sports Arena (4,447)	16–13-3
33	25	Pittsburgh Penguins	3–4	Pittsburgh (4,002)	16–14–3
34	27	St. Louis Blues	2–4	St. Louis	16–15–3
35	30	Philadelphia Flyers	0–2	The Forum (14,366)	16–16–3
36	31	Philadelphia Flyers	1–9	Philadelphia (5,643)	16–17–3

January

Game	Date	Opponent	Score	Location/attendance	Record
37	3	Minnesota North Stars	0–6	Minnesota (9,921)	16–18–3
38	4	Pittsburgh Penguins	3–4	Pittsburgh (4,202)	16–19–3
39	6	St. Louis Blues	1–2	St. Louis (7,186)	16–20–3
40	7	Oakland Seals	0–6	Oakland (4,577)	16–21–3
41	11	St. Louis Blues	2–2	The Forum (6,894)	16-21–4
42	18	Pittsburgh Penguins	3–2	The Forum (5,755)	17–21-4
43	19	New York Rangers	5–2	The Forum (11,740)	18–21-4
44	21	Oakland Seals	0–3	Oakland (3,650)	18–22–4
45	24	Oakland Seals	1–4	The Forum (7,553)	18–23–4
46	27	Pittsburgh Penguins	5–3	Pittsburgh (11,156)	19–23-4
47	28	Philadelphia Flyers	2–0	Philadelphia (13,577)	20–23-4
48	31	Minnesota North Stars	1–6	Minnesota (10,751)	20–24–4

February

Game	Date	Opponent	Score	Location/attendance	Record
49	1	Detroit Red Wings	8–6	Detroit (10,257)	21–24-4
50	3	Montreal Canadiens	1–5	Montreal (15,343)	21–25–4
51	4	Chicago Black Hawks	3–5	Chicago (16,666)	21–26–4
52	7	Minnesota North Stars	2–4	The Forum (7,120)	21–27–4
53	8	Pittsburgh Penguins	3–1	The Forum (6,195)	22–27-4
54	12	Toronto Maple Leafs	2–0	The Forum (12,397)	23–27-4
55	14	St. Louis Blues	2–2	St. Louis (7,652)	23-27–5
56	16	Philadelphia Flyers	7–1	The Forum (9,867)	24–27-5
57	18	Boston Bruins	5–6	The Forum (11,066)	24–28–5
58	24	Chicago Black Hawks	3–3	The Forum (15,752)	24-28–6
59	25	St. Louis Blues	4–2	The Forum (7,386)	25–28-6
60	29	Philadelphia Flyers	3–1	Philadelphia (9,115)	26–28-6

March

Game	Date	Opponent	Score	Location/attendance	Record
61	2	Toronto Maple Leafs	2–5	Toronto (15,816)	26–29–6
62	5	Montreal Canadiens	2–6	The Forum (14,450)	26–30–6
63	7	Oakland Seals	9–2	The Forum (6,678)	27–30-6
64	9	Pittsburgh Penguins	1–3	Pittsburgh (8,176)	27–31–6
65	10	New York Rangers	4–3	New York (17,250)	28–31-6
66	12	Detroit Red Wings	2–2	The Forum (10,244)	28-31–7
67	14	Philadelphia Flyers	0–0	Quebec City (4,116)	28-31–8
68	16	Minnesota North Stars	2–1	Minnesota (13,739)	29–31-8
69	20	Minnesota North Stars	3–3	The Forum (9,453)	29-31–9
70	22	St. Louis Blues	6–1	The Forum (8,753)	30–31-9
71	23	Philadelphia Flyers	4–2	The Forum (14,003)	31–31-9
72	26	Pittsburgh Penguins	1–2	The Forum (7,057)	31–32–9
73	27	Minnesota North Stars	3–5	The Forum (8,559)	31–33–9
74	30	Oakland Seals	2–2	Oakland (7,055)	31-33–10

Legend: Win (2 points) Loss (0 points) Tie (1 point)

=== Playoffs ===
==== 1968 NHL Quarterfinals ====
Minnesota North Stars vs. Los Angeles Kings

Date	Away	Score	Home	Score	Notes
April 4	Minnesota	1	Los Angeles	2	
April 6	Minnesota	0	Los Angeles	2	
April 9	Los Angeles	5	Minnesota	7	
April 11	Los Angeles	2	Minnesota	3	
April 13	Minnesota	2	Los Angeles	3	
April 16	Los Angeles	3	Minnesota	4	(OT)
April 18	Minnesota	9	Los Angeles	4	

Minnesota wins best-of-seven series 4–3.

== Player statistics ==
=== Forwards ===
Note: GP = Games played; G = Goals; A = Assists; Pts = Points; PIM = Penalty minutes

Player	GP	G	A	Pts	PIM
Eddie Joyal	74	23	34	57	20
Bill Flett	73	26	20	46	97
Lowell MacDonald	74	21	24	45	12
Ted Irvine	73	18	22	40	26
Gord Labossiere	68	13	27	40	31
Real Lemieux	74	12	23	35	60
Terry Gray	65	12	16	28	22
Howie Menard	35	9	15	24	32
Howie Hughes	74	9	14	23	20
Bryan Campbell	44	6	15	21	16
Brian Smith	58	10	9	19	33
Doug Robinson	34	9	9	18	6
Brian Kilrea	25	3	5	8	12
Jim Anderson	7	1	2	3	2
Bill Inglis	12	1	1	2	0
Mike Corbett	0	0	0	0	0
Mike Corrigan	5	0	0	0	2

=== Defensemen ===
Note: GP = Games played; G = Goals; A = Assists; Pts = Points; PIM = Penalty minutes

Player	GP	G	A	Pts	PIM
Bill White	74	11	27	38	100
Bob Wall	71	5	18	23	66
Dale Rolfe	68	3	13	16	84
Brent Hughes	44	4	10	14	36
Dave Amadio	58	4	6	10	101
Jacques Lemieux	16	0	3	3	8
Jim Murray	30	0	2	2	14
Poul Popiel	1	0	0	0	0
Larry Johnston	4	0	0	0	4

=== Goaltending ===
Note: GP = Games played; MIN = Minutes; W = Wins; L = Losses; T = Ties; SO = Shutouts; GAA = Goals against average

Player	GP	MIN	W	L	T	SO	GAA
Wayne Rutledge	45	2444	20	18	4	2	2.87
Terry Sawchuk	36	1936	11	14	6	2	3.07
Jacques Caron	1	60	0	1	0	0	4.00

== Awards and records ==
=== Records ===
==== Individual ====
- March 10, 1968: Fastest two goals, 6 seconds apart, Bill Flett at 9:14 of first period, and Eddie Joyal at 9:20.

==== Team ====
- Fewest short-handed goals against in season, 3
- Most shutouts against in season, 9

=== Milestones ===
Player is still active or individual record

Regular season
Player	Milestone	Reached
Brian Kilrea	First Kings goal	October 14, 1967

== Transactions ==
The Kings were involved in the following transactions during the 1967–68 season.

=== Trades ===
June 8, 1967	To Los Angeles Kings Red Kelly	To Toronto Maple Leafs Ken Block
June 16, 1967	To Los Angeles Kings Trevor Fahey; Jim Murray; Ken Turlick	To New York Rangers Barclay Plager
October 1, 1967	To Los Angeles Kings Cash	To Vancouver Canucks (WHL) Bill Sweeney; Loan of Mike Corbett; Loan of Larry Mavety

== Draft picks ==
=== NHL draft ===
Round	Pick	Player	Nationality
1	1	Rick Pagnutti	Canada

LA Kings primary logo

- NOTE: Back before 1979, the amateur draft was held with varying rules and procedures. In 1967, teams only needed to select as many player as they wanted to, which is why there was only one Kings player drafted.

=== Expansion draft ===
- Los Angeles Kings selections

#	Player	Drafted from
1.	Terry Sawchuk (G)	Toronto Maple Leafs
2.	Wayne Rutledge (G)	New York Rangers
3.	Gord Labossiere (C)	Montreal Canadiens
4.	Bob Wall (D)	Detroit Red Wings
5.	Ed Joyal (C)	Toronto Maple Leafs
6.	Real Lemieux (W)	Detroit Red Wings
7.	Poul Popiel (D)	Boston Bruins
8.	Terry Gray (RW)	Detroit Red Wings
9.	Bryan Campbell (C)	New York Rangers
10.	Ted Irvine (LW)	Boston Bruins
11.	Howie Hughes (RW)	Montreal Canadiens
12.	Bill Inglis (C)	Montreal Canadiens
13.	Doug Robinson (LW)	New York Rangers
14.	Mike Corrigan (LW)	Toronto Maple Leafs
15.	Jacques Lemieux (LW)	Montreal Canadiens
16.	Lowell MacDonald (LW)	Toronto Maple Leafs
17.	Ken Block (D)	New York Rangers
18.	Bill Flett (RW)	Toronto Maple Leafs
19.	Brent Hughes (D)	Detroit Red Wings
20.	Marc Dufour (RW)	New York Rangers

== Farm teams ==
- Springfield Indians (American Hockey League)

== Broadcasting ==
KNX 1070 was the radio broadcaster in all games. KTLA covered 20 of the 37 away games through a simulcast. CBS broadcast nationally the first game at the Forum.
