= 1960–61 MJHL season =

Manitoba ice hockey season

== League notes ==
The League said it would announce midseason Allstar Teams, starting this year.

== Regular season ==
League Standings	GP	W	L	T	Pts	GF	GA
Brandon Wheat Kings	32	24	8	0	48	219	136
Winnipeg Rangers	32	21	11	0	42	157	120
Winnipeg Braves	32	18	14	0	36	145	117
St. Boniface Canadiens	32	10	21	1	21	141	191
Winnipeg Monarchs	32	6	25	1	13	107	205

== Midseason All-Star Teams ==
First All-Star Team
Goaltender	Ernie Wakely	Winnipeg Braves
Defencemen	Ken Stephanson	Winnipeg Braves
Defencemen	Bob Woytowich	Winnipeg Rangers
Centreman	George Hill	Brandon Wheat Kings
Leftwinger	Dave Richardson	Winnipeg Rangers
Rightwinger	Barry Hogan	Brandon Wheat Kings
Second All-Star Team
Goaltender	Keith Micklash	Winnipeg Rangers
Defencemen	Bob Lindsay	Winnipeg Rangers
Defencemen	George Peary	Brandon Wheat Kings
Centreman	John Russell	St. Boniface Canadiens
Leftwinger	Ted Taylor	Brandon Wheat Kings
Rightwinger	Harry Beuchart	Winnipeg Rangers

== Playoffs ==
Semi-Finals

Brandon defeated Braves 3-games-to-none
Rangers defeated St. Boniface 3-games-to-none

Turnbull Cup Championship

Brandon lost to Rangers 4-games-to-2

Western Memorial Cup Semi-Final

Rangers defeated Fort William Canadiens (TBJHL) 4-games-to-3

Western Memorial Cup Final (Abbott Cup)

Rangers lost to Edmonton Oil Kings (CAHL) 4-games-to-1

== Awards ==
Trophy	Winner	Team
MVP		
Top Goaltender	Ernie Wakely	Winnipeg Braves
Rookie of the Year		
Scoring Champion	George Hill	Brandon Wheat Kings
Most Goals	George Hill	Brandon Wheat Kings
