= Dave Richardson (ice hockey) =

Canadian ice hockey player (1940–2022)

- Born: December 11, 1940; St. Boniface, Manitoba, Canada
- Died: December 27, 2022 (aged 82); Winnipeg, Manitoba, Canada
- Height: 5 ft 9 in (175 cm)
- Weight: 165 lb (75 kg; 11 st 11 lb)
- Position: Left wing
- Shot: Left
- Played for: Chicago Black Hawks; Detroit Red Wings; New York Rangers
- Playing career: 1960–1974

David George Joseph Richardson (December 11, 1940 – December 27, 2022) was a Canadian professional ice hockey winger who played 45 games in the National Hockey League with the Chicago Black Hawks, Detroit Red Wings, and New York Rangers between 1963 and 1967. The rest of his career, which lasted from 1960 to 1974, was spent in various minor leagues.

== Career statistics ==
=== Regular season and playoffs ===
			Regular season					Playoffs
Season	Team	League	GP	G	A	Pts	PIM	GP	G	A	Pts	PIM
1957–58	Brandon Rangers	MJHL	28	3	7	10	39	—	—	—	—	—
1958–59	Winnipeg Rangers	MJHL	31	10	13	23	60	4	0	1	1	9
1959–60	Winnipeg Rangers	MJHL	26	19	17	36	121	12	6	30	36	10
1960–61	Winnipeg Rangers	MJHL	29	17	31	48	65	—	—	—	—	—
1960–61	Seattle Totems	WHL	2	0	0	0	4	—	—	—	—	—
1960–61	Edmonton Oil Kings	M-Cup	—	—	—	—	—	4	2	1	3	0
1960–61	Winnipeg Maroons	Al-Cup	—	—	—	—	—	4	0	2	2	12
1961–62	Los Angeles Blades	WHL	3	0	1	1	0	—	—	—	—	—
1961–62	Fort Wayne Komets	IHL	65	24	47	71	166	—	—	—	—	—
1962–63	Sudbury Wolves	EPHL	72	29	38	67	117	8	3	1	4	8
1963–64	New York Rangers	NHL	34	3	1	4	21	—	—	—	—	—
1963–64	Baltimore Clippers	AHL	37	9	15	24	88	—	—	—	—	—
1964–65	New York Rangers	NHL	7	0	1	1	4	—	—	—	—	—
1964–65	St. Paul Rangers	CHL	8	3	2	5	10	—	—	—	—	—
1964–65	Baltimore Clippers	AHL	47	17	23	40	89	3	0	0	0	2
1965–66	Chicago Black Hawks	NHL	3	0	0	0	2	—	—	—	—	—
1965–66	Buffalo Bisons	AHL	35	11	14	25	58	—	—	—	—	—
1965–66	St. Louis Braves	CHL	6	1	3	4	2	—	—	—	—	—
1966–67	Buffalo Bisons	AHL	71	13	35	48	54	—	—	—	—	—
1967–68	Memphis South Stars	CHL	46	21	28	49	71	13	3	6	9	17
1967–68	Detroit Red Wings	NHL	1	0	0	0	0	—	—	—	—	—
1968–69	San Diego Gulls	WHL	51	9	12	21	55	—	—	—	—	—
1969–70	San Diego Gulls	WHL	24	4	6	10	35	—	—	—	—	—
1971–72	St. Boniface Mohawks	CCHL	—	—	—	—	—	—	—	—	—	—
1972–73	St. Boniface Mohawks	CCHL	24	33	55	88	27	—	—	—	—	—
1973–74	Warroad Lakers	CCHL	24	14	14	28	—	—	—	—	—	—
AHL totals			190	50	87	137	289	3	0	0	0	2
NHL totals			45	3	2	5	27	—	—	—	—	—
