= George Hill (ice hockey) =

Canadian ice hockey player

- Born: February 6, 1941 (age 85) Winnipeg, Manitoba, Canada
- Height: 5 ft 9 in (175 cm)
- Weight: 174 lb (79 kg; 12 st 6 lb)
- Position: Center
- Played for: Michigan Tech; Green Bay Bobcats; Charlotte Checkers; Omaha Knights; Tulsa Oilers; Los Angeles Blades; Buffalo Bisons; Calgary Stampeders
- NHL draft: Undrafted
- Playing career: 1961–1972

George J. Hill (born February 6, 1941) is a Canadian retired ice hockey center and coach who was an All-American for Michigan Tech.

== Early life ==
Hill was born in Winnipeg. In 1960, he led the Brandon Wheat Kings to a first-place finish in the MJHL championship, winning the league scoring title, Rookie of the Year, and MVP. Brandon won the league tournament and advanced all the way to the Abbott Cup final, where they fell to the Edmonton Oil Kings 3–4. Hill's team had a near repeat performance the following year, this time losing to Edmonton, 1–4.

== Career ==
After two junior seasons, Hill was recruited to Michigan Tech by John MacInnes. He played on the freshman team in 1962 and watched the varsity club win the program's first National Championship. Hill led the team in scoring and was named both the WCHA Sophomore of the Year and an All-American. The Huskies were unable to overcome North Dakota in the Conference semifinal and did not compete in the national tournament. Hill was named team captain the following year. While he produced nearly identical numbers, the team was unable to defeat Michigan, losing their two-game series 8–9 on aggregate.

Hill left after his second season and pursued a professional career, playing in several senior and minor leagues over the next eight years. He ended his career in Austria, helping Wiener EV to a runner-up finish in 1972. He was inducted into the Michigan Tech Sports Hall of Fame in 1994.

== Career statistics ==
=== Regular season and playoffs ===
			Regular season					Playoffs
Season	Team	League	GP	G	A	Pts	PIM	GP	G	A	Pts	PIM
1958–59	Flin Flon Bombers	SJHL	—	—	—	—	—	—	—	—	—	—
1959–60	Brandon Wheat Kings	MJHL	—	—	—	—	—	—	—	—	—	—
1960–61	Brandon Wheat Kings	MJHL	—	—	—	—	—	—	—	—	—	—
1962–63	Michigan Tech	WCHA	29	22	20	42	8	—	—	—	—	—
1963–64	Michigan Tech	WCHA	27	20	21	41	10	—	—	—	—	—
1964–65	Green Bay Bobcats	USHL	—	18	19	37	—	—	—	—	—	—
1965–66	Charlotte Checkers	EHL	70	48	57	105	50	—	—	—	—	—
1966–67	Omaha Knights	CPHL	10	3	3	6	0	—	—	—	—	—
1966–67	Tulsa Oilers	CPHL	38	12	11	23	12	—	—	—	—	—
1966–67	Los Angeles Blades	WHL	10	1	2	3	2	—	—	—	—	—
1967–68	Buffalo Bisons	AHL	7	1	2	3	2	—	—	—	—	—
1967–68	Calgary Spurs	WCSHL	—	—	—	—	—	—	—	—	—	—
1968–69	Calgary Stampeders	ASHL	—	—	—	—	—	—	—	—	—	—
1969–70	Calgary Stampeders	ASHL	—	—	—	—	—	—	—	—	—	—
1970–71	Calgary Stampeders	ASHL	—	—	—	—	—	—	—	—	—	—
1971–72	Wiener EV	AUT	26	25	11	36	94	—	—	—	—	—
NCAA Totals			56	42	41	83	18	—	—	—	—	—

== Awards and honors ==
Award	Year
All-WCHA First Team	1962–63
AHCA West All-American	1962–63
All-WCHA Second Team	1963–64

Awards and achievements
Preceded by Gordon Wilkie	WCHA Sophomore of the Year; 1962–63	Succeeded by Tom Polanic
