= Bob Woytowich =

Canadian ice hockey player

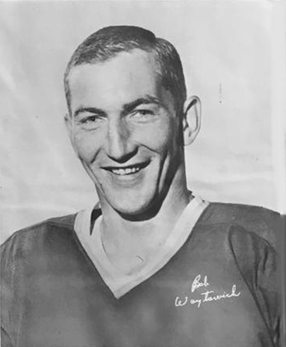
- Born: August 18, 1941 Winnipeg, Manitoba, Canada
- Died: July 30, 1988 (aged 46) near St. Andrews, Manitoba, Canada
- Height: 6 ft 0 in (183 cm)
- Weight: 185 lb (84 kg; 13 st 3 lb)
- Position: Defence
- Shot: Right
- Played for: Boston Bruins; Minnesota North Stars; Pittsburgh Penguins; Los Angeles Kings; Winnipeg Jets (WHA); Indianapolis Racers (WHA)
- Playing career: 1962–1978

Robert Ivan Woytowich (August 18, 1941 – July 30, 1988) was a Canadian ice hockey defenceman. He played for the National Hockey League from 1964 to 1972, and in the World Hockey Association from 1972 to 1976.

== Playing career ==
Woytowich started his National Hockey League career with the Boston Bruins in 1964. He would also play for the Minnesota North Stars, Pittsburgh Penguins, and Los Angeles Kings. He left for World Hockey Association after the 1972 season. He would play for the Winnipeg Jets and Indianapolis Racers.

During Woytowich's tenure in Pittsburgh, he became a favorite of fans who formed a fan club called Woytowich's Polish Army (Woytowich was of Polish descent). The club camped in the upper reaches of the Pittsburgh Civic Arena during weekday home games and filled an entire section during Saturday home games. Despite its name, one did not have to be of Polish descent to be a member of the Polish Army. Members had to have the money to purchase a general admission ticket and were forbidden from saying anything nice about Penguins opponents.

On July 30, 1988, Woytowich suffered a heart attack while driving his car near Winnipeg. The car was involved in an accident and he died.

== Awards and achievements ==
- CPHL First All-Star Team (1964)
- Played in NHL All-Star Game (1970)
- Honoured Member of the Manitoba Hockey Hall of Fame.

== Career statistics ==
=== Regular season and playoffs ===
			Regular season					Playoffs
Season	Team	League	GP	G	A	Pts	PIM	GP	G	A	Pts	PIM
1958–59	Transcona Rangers	MJHL	28	7	3	10	34	4	0	1	1	4
1959–60	Winnipeg Rangers	MJHL	27	7	16	23	68	12	6	2	8	34
1960–61	Winnipeg Rangers	MJHL	30	8	21	29	82	9	3	7	10	6
1960–61	Seattle Totems	WHL	2	0	0	0	0	—	—	—	—	—
1961–62	Winnipeg Rangers	MJHL	40	9	18	27	65	—	—	—	—	—
1961–62	Brandon Wheat Kings	M-Cup	—	—	—	—	—	7	1	3	4	12
1962–63	Sudbury Wolves	EPHL	71	17	27	44	69	8	0	3	3	8
1963–64	St. Paul Rangers	CPHL	68	9	31	40	101	11	2	4	6	8
1964–65	Boston Bruins	NHL	21	2	10	12	16	—	—	—	—	—
1964–65	Hershey Bears	AHL	48	5	21	26	56	—	—	—	—	—
1965–66	Boston Bruins	NHL	68	2	17	19	75	—	—	—	—	—
1966–67	Boston Bruins	NHL	64	2	7	9	43	—	—	—	—	—
1967–68	Minnesota North Stars	NHL	66	4	17	21	63	14	0	1	1	18
1968–69	Pittsburgh Penguins	NHL	71	9	20	29	62	—	—	—	—	—
1969–70	Pittsburgh Penguins	NHL	68	8	25	33	49	10	1	2	3	2
1970–71	Pittsburgh Penguins	NHL	78	4	22	26	30	—	—	—	—	—
1971–72	Pittsburgh Penguins	NHL	31	1	4	5	8	—	—	—	—	—
1971–72	Los Angeles Kings	NHL	36	0	4	4	6	—	—	—	—	—
1972–73	Winnipeg Jets	WHA	62	2	4	6	47	14	1	1	2	4
1973–74	Winnipeg Jets	WHA	72	6	28	34	43	4	0	0	0	0
1974–75	Winnipeg Jets	WHA	24	0	4	4	8	—	—	—	—	—
1974–75	Indianapolis Racers	WHA	42	0	8	8	28	—	—	—	—	—
1975–76	Indianapolis Racers	WHA	42	1	7	8	14	—	—	—	—	—
1976–77	Mohawk Valley Comets	NAHL	37	0	10	10	4	—	—	—	—	—
1977–78	Steinbach Stallions	CCSHL	4	0	1	1	7	—	—	—	—	—
WHA totals			242	9	51	60	140	18	1	1	2	4
NHL totals			503	32	126	158	352	24	1	3	4	20

Preceded by Position created	Minnesota North Stars captain 1967–68	Succeeded by Elmer Vasko
