= Ted Taylor (ice hockey) =

Canadian ice hockey player

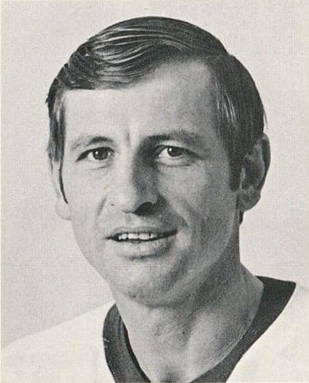
- Born: February 25, 1942 (age 83) Oak Lake, Manitoba, Canada
- Height: 6 ft 0 in (183 cm)
- Weight: 174 lb (79 kg; 12 st 6 lb)
- Position: Left wing
- Shot: Left
- Played for: Houston Aeros (WHA); Vancouver Canucks (NHL); Minnesota North Stars (NHL); Detroit Red Wings (NHL); New York Rangers (NHL)
- Playing career: 1961–1978

Edward Wray Taylor (born February 25, 1942) is a Canadian former professional ice hockey player who played 166 games in the National Hockey League and 421 games in the World Hockey Association. He played with the Detroit Red Wings, New York Rangers, Minnesota North Stars, Vancouver Canucks, and Houston Aeros. Taylor made his professional debut in 1962, spending his first several years in the minor leagues before making his NHL debut in 1965. He would split the next few years between the NHL and minor leagues before playing two full seasons with the Canucks from 1970 to 1972. He then moved to Houston of the upstart World Hockey Association, and played the last six years of his career there, helping the Aeros win the championship Avco World Trophy in both 1974 and 1975, before retiring in 1978.

== Career statistics ==
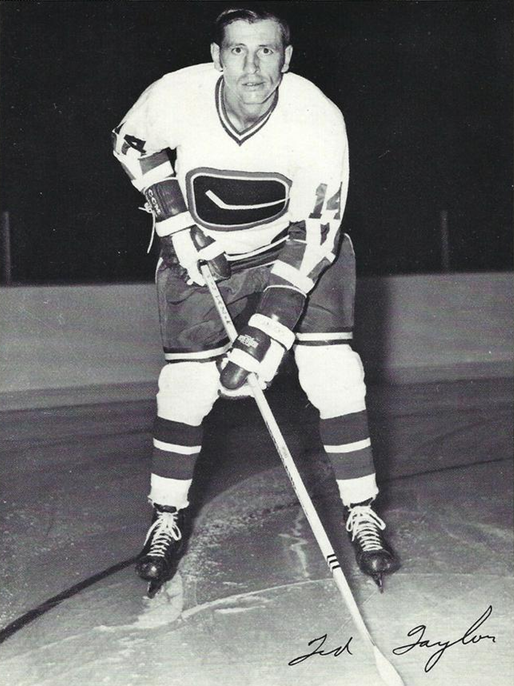
Taylor was a member of the NHL expansion team Vancouver Canucks in 1970

=== Regular season and playoffs ===
			Regular season					Playoffs
Season	Team	League	GP	G	A	Pts	PIM	GP	G	A	Pts	PIM
1959–60	Brandon Wheat Kings	MJHL	32	14	12	26	54	11	2	7	9	2
1960–61	Brandon Wheat Kings	MJHL	32	28	30	58	53	9	5	5	10	18
1960–61	Vancouver Canucks	WHL	1	0	0	0	0	—	—	—	—	—
1961–62	Brandon Wheat Kings	MJHL	40	28	32	60	72	9	6	4	10	13
1962–63	Sudbury Wolves	EPHL	56	22	23	45	76	—	—	—	—	—
1962–63	Baltimore Clippers	AHL	14	5	7	12	17	3	0	0	0	4
1963–64	Baltimore Clippers	AHL	6	0	2	2	6	—	—	—	—	—
1963–64	St. Paul Rangers	CPHL	59	18	30	48	97	11	2	2	4	4
1964–65	New York Rangers	NHL	4	0	0	0	4	—	—	—	—	—
1964–65	Baltimore Clippers	AHL	68	25	28	53	74	3	0	0	0	4
1965–66	New York Rangers	NHL	4	0	1	1	2	—	—	—	—	—
1965–66	Baltimore Clippers	AHL	62	21	30	51	98	—	—	—	—	—
1966–67	Detroit Red Wings	NHL	2	0	0	0	0	—	—	—	—	—
1966–67	Pittsburgh Hornets	AHL	69	20	38	58	91	9	3	2	5	8
1967–68	Minnesota North Stars	NHL	31	3	5	8	34	—	—	—	—	—
1968–69	Vancouver Canucks	WHL	64	15	29	44	121	8	1	4	5	4
1969–70	Vancouver Canucks	WHL	66	36	35	71	97	11	9	8	17	46
1970–71	Vancouver Canucks	NHL	56	11	16	27	53	—	—	—	—	—
1971–72	Vancouver Canucks	NHL	69	9	13	22	88	—	—	—	—	—
1972–73	Houston Aeros	WHA	72	34	42	76	101	10	3	1	4	10
1973–74	Houston Aeros	WHA	75	21	23	44	143	14	4	8	12	60
1974–75	Houston Aeros	WHA	73	26	27	53	130	11	2	5	7	22
1975–76	Houston Aeros	WHA	68	15	26	41	88	11	2	2	4	17
1976–77	Houston Aeros	WHA	78	16	35	51	90	11	4	4	8	28
1977–78	Houston Aeros	WHA	54	11	11	22	46	6	3	1	4	10
WHA totals			420	123	164	287	598	63	18	21	39	147
NHL totals			166	23	35	58	181	—	—	—	—	—

== Awards and achievements ==
- Turnbull Cup MJHL Championship (1960, 1962)
- Avco Cup (WHA) Championships (1974, 1975)
- Member of the Manitoba Hockey Hall of Fame
