= Sandy Fitzpatrick =

Scottish-born Canadian ice hockey player

- Born: December 22, 1944 (age 80) Paisley, Scotland, UK
- Height: 6 ft 1 in (185 cm)
- Weight: 185 lb (84 kg; 13 st 3 lb)
- Position: Centre
- Shot: Left
- Played for: New York Rangers; Minnesota North Stars
- Playing career: 1965–1972

Alexander Stewart Fitzpatrick (born December 22, 1944) is a Canadian former professional ice hockey player. He played 22 games in the National Hockey League with the New York Rangers and Minnesota North Stars during the 1964–65 and 1967–68 seasons. The rest of his career, which lasted from 1965 to 1972, was spent in the minor leagues. He was born in Paisley, Scotland, United Kingdom and raised in Dundas, Ontario.

== Career statistics ==
=== Regular season and playoffs ===
			Regular season					Playoffs
Season	Team	League	GP	G	A	Pts	PIM	GP	G	A	Pts	PIM
1961–62	Guelph Royals	OHA	48	5	7	12	21	—	—	—	—	—
1962–63	Guelph Royals	OHA	50	9	25	34	52	—	—	—	—	—
1963–64	Kitchener Rangers	OHA	56	23	28	51	61	—	—	—	—	—
1964–65	New York Rangers	NHL	4	0	0	0	2	—	—	—	—	—
1964–65	Kitchener Rangers	OHA	56	51	55	106	140	—	—	—	—	—
1964–65	St. Paul Rangers	CHL	—	—	—	—	—	3	0	0	0	0
1965–66	Minnesota Rangers	CHL	68	15	30	45	74	7	5	3	8	4
1966–67	Omaha Knights	CHL	49	7	19	26	57	11	0	0	0	9
1967–68	Minnesota North Stars	NHL	18	3	6	9	6	12	0	0	0	0
1967–68	Memphis South Stars	CHL	56	15	29	44	56	—	—	—	—	—
1968–69	Memphis South Stars	CHL	66	14	26	40	32	—	—	—	—	—
1969–70	San Diego Gulls	WHL	67	17	29	46	16	3	0	0	0	4
1970–71	San Diego Gulls	WHL	70	13	21	34	41	6	0	2	2	2
1971–72	San Diego Gulls	WHL	24	2	5	7	19	—	—	—	—	—
CHL totals			173	37	78	115	187	21	5	3	8	13
NHL totals			22	3	6	9	8	12	0	0	0	0

== See also ==
- List of National Hockey League players from the United Kingdom
