= Dave Amadio =

Canadian ice hockey player (1939–1981)

- Born: April 23, 1939; Glace Bay, Nova Scotia, Canada
- Died: April 10, 1981 (aged 41)
- Height: 6 ft 1 in (185 cm)
- Weight: 207 lb (94 kg; 14 st 11 lb)
- Position: Defence
- Shot: Right
- Played for: Detroit Red Wings; Los Angeles Kings
- Playing career: 1958–1974

David Augustus "Hoss" Amadio (April 23, 1939 – April 10, 1981) was a Canadian professional ice hockey player who played 125 games in the National Hockey League with the Los Angeles Kings and Detroit Red Wings between 1958 and 1969. The rest of his career, which lasted from 1958 to 1974, was spent in various minor leagues.

== Early life ==
Amadio was born in Glace Bay, Nova Scotia, and raised in Donkin, Nova Scotia.

== Career ==
Amadio spent much of his professional career, playing 500 games over eight seasons, with the Springfield Indians of the American Hockey League, including the team's Calder Cup championship in 1961–62. Amadio holds the AHL record for most goals by a defenseman in a game with five, scored against future Hockey Hall of Fame goaltender Gerry Cheevers and the Rochester Americans on February 8, 1964. Amadio scored the first two goals of the next night's match against the Pittsburgh Hornets, for a total of seven goals in less than 40 minutes of play; he scored only four other goals in the entire season.

Following his retirement as a player after the 1974 season, Amadio coached a single season for the Calgary Centennials of the Western Canada Hockey League.

== Death ==
Amadio died of a heart attack in 1981, less than two weeks shy of his 42nd birthday.

== Career statistics ==
=== Regular season and playoffs ===
			Regular season					Playoffs
Season	Team	League	GP	G	A	Pts	PIM	GP	G	A	Pts	PIM
1954–55	Glace Bay Miners	CBJHL	30	7	18	25	50	—	—	—	—	—
1955–56	Burlington Hallidays	COJHL	—	—	—	—	—	—	—	—	—	—
1956–57	Hamilton Tiger Cubs	OHA	44	10	9	19	117	4	0	1	1	2
1957–58	Hamilton Tiger Cubs	OHA	52	13	21	34	122	15	2	5	7	56
1957–58	Detroit Red Wings	NHL	2	0	0	0	2	—	—	—	—	—
1957–58	Hershey Bears	AHL	—	—	—	—	—	1	0	0	0	0
1958–59	Edmonton Flyers	WHL	58	7	7	14	110	3	0	1	1	2
1959–60	Edmonton Flyers	WHL	13	1	4	5	35	—	—	—	—	—
1959–60	Sudbury Wolves	EPHL	50	13	17	30	139	14	3	7	10	14
1960–61	Sudbury Wolves	EPHL	25	2	14	16	50	—	—	—	—	—
1961–62	Sudbury Wolves	EPHL	9	0	5	5	15	—	—	—	—	—
1961–62	Springfield Indians	AHL	58	4	11	15	56	11	0	1	1	19
1962–63	Springfield Indians	AHL	71	8	19	27	95	—	—	—	—	—
1963–64	Springfield Indians	AHL	72	11	24	35	120	—	—	—	—	—
1964–65	Springfield Indians	AHL	72	10	24	34	100	—	—	—	—	—
1965–66	Springfield Indians	AHL	72	9	11	20	124	6	0	3	3	6
1966–67	Springfield Indians	AHL	66	11	29	40	89	—	—	—	—	—
1967–68	Los Angeles Kings	NHL	58	4	6	10	101	7	0	2	2	8
1967–68	Springfield Indians	AHL	17	2	6	8	25	—	—	—	—	—
1968–69	Los Angeles Kings	NHL	65	1	5	6	60	9	1	0	1	10
1969–70	Springfield Kings	AHL	40	4	15	19	78	13	1	1	2	10
1970–71	Kansas City Blues	CHL	30	2	13	15	45	—	—	—	—	—
1970–71	Denver Spurs	WHL	35	0	6	6	42	—	—	—	—	—
1971–72	Salt Lake Golden Eagles	WHL	68	6	22	28	93	—	—	—	—	—
1972–73	Salt Lake Golden Eagles	WHL	72	6	33	39	129	9	3	2	5	16
1973–74	Seattle Totems	WHL	70	6	13	19	60	—	—	—	—	—
AHL totals			468	59	139	198	687	31	1	5	6	35
NHL totals			125	5	11	16	163	16	1	2	3	18
