= Ken Stephanson =

Canadian ice hockey player (1941–2022)

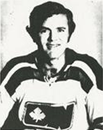
- Stephanson in 1972 photo
- Born: November 13, 1941 Selkirk, Manitoba, Canada
- Died: December 1, 2022 (aged 81)
- Height: 5 ft 11 in (180 cm)
- Weight: 190 lb (86 kg; 13 st 8 lb)
- Position: Defence
- Shot: Left
- Played for: Winnipeg Jets; Ottawa Nationals
- Playing career: 1959–1974

Ken Stephanson (November 13, 1941 – December 1, 2022) was a Canadian professional ice hockey defenceman who played 106 games in the World Hockey Association (WHA) for the Winnipeg Jets and Ottawa Nationals.

== Career statistics ==
=== Regular season and playoffs ===
			Regular season					Playoffs
Season	Team	League	GP	G	A	Pts	PIM	GP	G	A	Pts	PIM
1959–60	Winnipeg Warriors	WHL	4	1	1	2	10	—	—	—	—	—
1960–61	Winnipeg Warriors	WHL	9	0	1	1	2	—	—	—	—	—
1961–62	Kingston Frontenacs	EPHL	33	1	6	7	73	—	—	—	—	—
1962–63	Kingston Frontenacs	EPHL	72	4	18	22	136	5	0	2	2	14
1963–64	Minneapolis Bruins	CPHL	72	3	26	29	175	5	0	1	1	12
1964–65	Minneapolis Bruins	CPHL	70	3	16	19	112	5	0	2	2	23
1965–66	Baltimore Clippers	AHL	55	1	11	12	97	—	—	—	—	—
1966–67	Providence Reds	AHL	72	6	18	24	119	—	—	—	—	—
1968–69	Canadian National Team	Intl	Statistics Unavailable
1969–70	Canadian National Team	Intl	Statistics Unavailable
1970–71	St. Boniface Mohawks	MSHL	Statistics Unavailable
1971–72	St. Boniface Mohawks	CCHL	Statistics Unavailable
1972–73	Ottawa Nationals	WHA	77	3	16	19	93	5	1	1	2	8
1973–74	Winnipeg Jets	WHA	29	0	7	7	24	3	0	2	2	10
WHA totals			106	3	23	26	117	8	1	3	4	18
