= Mike Corrigan =

Canadian ice hockey player

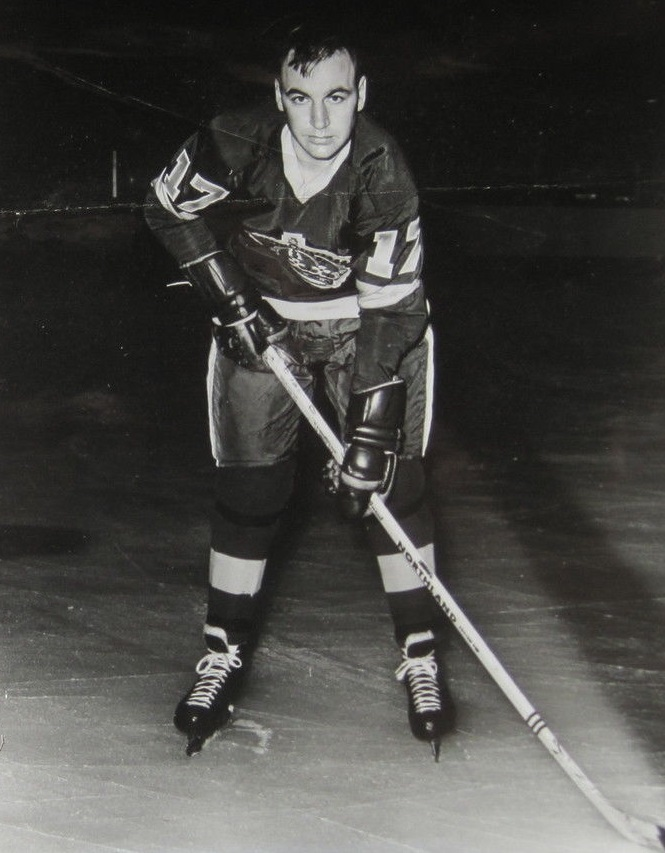
- Born: January 11, 1946 (age 80) Ottawa, Ontario, Canada
- Height: 5 ft 10 in (178 cm)
- Weight: 195 lb (88 kg; 13 st 13 lb)
- Position: Left wing
- Shot: Left
- Played for: NHL; Los Angeles Kings; Vancouver Canucks; Pittsburgh Penguins; AHL; Rochester Americans; Springfield Kings; CHL; Tulsa Oilers; Fort Worth Texans
- Playing career: 1965–1978

Michael Joseph Douglas Corrigan (born January 11, 1946) is a Canadian former professional ice hockey forward who played 594 games in the National Hockey League. He played for the Los Angeles Kings, Vancouver Canucks, and Pittsburgh Penguins. From 1981 until 1984, Corrigan also served as an assistant coach to the Penguins.

Corrigan was born in Ottawa, Ontario. His best season was 1972-73 when he tallied 37 goals for the Kings. He was often paired with Bob Berry and Juha Widing on a line nicknamed "The Hot Line." In the 1975-76 season, he had 22 goals. In a memorable playoff game (game 6 of the quarterfinals) vs. the Boston Bruins, he was tripped but scored while lying on his stomach in the waning moments to tie a game the Kings won in overtime.

== Career statistics ==
			Regular Season					Playoffs
Season	Team	League	GP	G	A	Pts	PIM	GP	G	A	Pts	PIM
1964–65	Toronto Marlboros	OHA	56	30	67	97	0	—	—	—	—	—
1965–66	Toronto Marlboros	OHA	41	25	36	61	70	—	—	—	—	—
1965–66	Rochester Americans	AHL	3	1	0	1	4	—	—	—	—	—
1965–66	Tulsa Oilers	CPHL	—	—	—	—	—	8	1	5	6	5
1966–67	Rochester Americans	AHL	49	11	21	32	34	—	—	—	—	—
1966–67	Tulsa Oilers	CPHL	15	4	3	7	6	—	—	—	—	—
1967–68	Los Angeles Kings	NHL	5	0	0	0	2	—	—	—	—	—
1967–68	Springfield Kings	AHL	58	24	30	54	57	4	1	2	3	13
1968–69	Springfield Kings	AHL	66	17	16	33	85	—	—	—	—	—
1969–70	Los Angeles Kings	NHL	36	6	4	10	30	—	—	—	—	—
1969–70	Springfield Kings	AHL	37	19	23	42	49	14	7	7	14	51
1970–71	Vancouver Canucks	NHL	76	21	28	49	103	—	—	—	—	—
1971–72	Vancouver Canucks	NHL	19	3	4	7	27	—	—	—	—	—
1971–72	Los Angeles Kings	NHL	56	12	22	34	93	—	—	—	—	—
1972–73	Los Angeles Kings	NHL	78	37	30	67	146	—	—	—	—	—
1973–74	Los Angeles Kings	NHL	75	16	26	42	119	3	0	1	1	4
1974–75	Los Angeles Kings	NHL	80	13	21	34	61	3	0	0	0	4
1975–76	Los Angeles Kings	NHL	71	22	21	43	71	9	2	2	4	12
1976–77	Pittsburgh Penguins	NHL	73	14	27	41	36	2	0	0	0	0
1976–77	Fort Worth Texans	CHL	2	1	3	4	2	—	—	—	—	—
1977–78	Pittsburgh Penguins	NHL	25	8	12	20	10	—	—	—	—	—
NHL totals			594	152	195	347	698	17	2	3	5	20
