= 1959–60 MJHL season =

Manitoba ice hockey season

The Transcona Rangers change their name to the Winnipeg Rangers.

== Regular season ==
League Standings	GP	W	L	T	Pts	GF	GA
Brandon Wheat Kings	32	23	6	3	49	185	79
St. Boniface Canadiens	31	21	9	1	43	140	93
Winnipeg Braves	31	16	14	1	33	141	126
Winnipeg Rangers	32	10	21	1	21	100	144
Winnipeg Monarchs	32	5	27	0	10	90	221

== Playoffs ==
Semi-Finals

Brandon defeated Braves 3-games-to-1
St. Boniface lost to Rangers 3-games-to-2

Turnbull Cup Championship

Brandon defeated Rangers 3-games-to-2 with 2 games tied

Western Memorial Cup Semi-Final

Brandon defeated Fort William Hurricanes (TBJHL) 4-games-to-none

Western Memorial Cup Final (Abbott Cup)

Brandon lost to Edmonton Oil Kings (CAHL) 4-games-to-3

== Awards ==
Trophy	Winner	Team
MVP	George Hill	Brandon Wheat Kings
Top Goaltender	Don Holmes	Brandon Wheat Kings
Rookie of the Year	George Hill	Brandon Wheat Kings
Scoring Champion	George Hill	Brandon Wheat Kings
Most Goals	John Ayotte	Winnipeg Braves
