= 1967 NHL expansion draft =

Player selection draft

General information
- Date: June 6, 1967
- Location: Queen Elizabeth Hotel; Montreal, Quebec, Canada

Overview
- League: National Hockey League
- Expansion teams: California Seals; Los Angeles Kings; Minnesota North Stars; Philadelphia Flyers; Pittsburgh Penguins; St. Louis Blues
- Expansion season: 1967–68

The 1967 NHL expansion draft was held on June 6, 1967, in the ballroom of the Queen Elizabeth Hotel in Montreal, Quebec. The draft took place to fill the rosters of the league's six expansion teams for the 1967–68 season: the California Seals, Los Angeles Kings, Minnesota North Stars, Philadelphia Flyers, Pittsburgh Penguins and the St. Louis Blues.

== Rules ==
As this ambitious expansion doubled the league's size from six to twelve teams, a large number of players were needed to fill the rosters of the new franchises. Almost all of the leading professional hockey players in North America were already under contract with the six existing franchises; therefore, the draft was established to equitably distribute players from the Original Six clubs (the Boston Bruins, Chicago Black Hawks, Detroit Red Wings, Montreal Canadiens, New York Rangers, and Toronto Maple Leafs) to the new teams. Each expansion team was to select twenty players from the established clubs: two goaltenders and eighteen forwards and defencemen. Thus, a total of 120 players were selected.

The existing clubs were allowed to exclude a goaltender and eleven other players from eligibility in the draft by naming them to "protected" lists. Also excluded from the draft were Junior players, players who were young enough to play Junior (born on or after June 1, 1946) but who were already playing professionally, and players sold to the minor league Western Hockey League and Central Professional Hockey League before June 1, 1966.

The draft began with the drawing of the draft order. Each of the new teams' names was placed on a paper ballot enclosed in a capsule, which was drawn from the bowl of the Stanley Cup by NHL President Clarence Campbell. Montreal Canadiens general manager Sam Pollock helped Campbell draw up the rules for the draft. This draft order was used in the first round to draft goaltenders. The order was then reversed in the second round, which was again specifically for goaltenders. The third round retained the second round's order, and in every subsequent round the draft order would rotate, such that the team that had picked first in the previous round would pick last in the following round while the other teams moved up to fill its place. Each expansion team had three minutes from the time of the previous selection to make its pick.

After each of the first, third, fourth, seventh and subsequent players lost by any of the established teams, the team in question chose one undrafted player that it had left unprotected and moved him onto their protected lists. Players who had played professionally for the first time in the 1966–67 season were ineligible from being picked until their respective team had filled their protected list with at least two goaltenders and eighteen other players.

=== Protected lists ===
- Boston: goaltender – Gerry Cheevers; skaters – John Bucyk, Ted Green, Ed Westfall, Tom Williams, John McKenzie, Don Awrey, Ken Hodge, Phil Esposito, Fred Stanfield, Eddie Shack and Gary Doak. Among notable players who were initially unprotected but later added to the list as fills were Dallas Smith, Wayne Cashman, Eddie Johnston, Jean Pronovost, Ron Murphy, Glen Sather and Bob Leiter.
- Chicago: goaltender – Denis DeJordy; skaters – Bobby Hull, Dennis Hull, Doug Jarrett, Chico Maki, Gilles Marotte, Pit Martin, Stan Mikita, Doug Mohns, Pierre Pilote, Ken Wharram and Pat Stapleton. Among notable players who were initially unprotected but later added to the list as fills were Eric Nesterenko, Wayne Maki and Dave Dryden.
- Detroit: goaltender – Roger Crozier; skaters – Gordie Howe, Alex Delvecchio, Norm Ullman, Gary Bergman, Paul Henderson, Bruce MacGregor, Ted Hampson, Dean Prentice, Bert Marshall, Doug Roberts and Bob McCord. Among notable players who were initially unprotected but later added to the list as fills were Nick Libett, Howie Young, Gary Jarrett, Floyd Smith and Jim Watson.
- Montreal: goaltender – Lorne Worsley; skaters – Jean Beliveau, Yvan Cournoyer, J. C. Tremblay, Jacques Laperriere, Ted Harris, Terry Harper, John Ferguson, Ralph Backstrom, Henri Richard, Gilles Tremblay and Bobby Rousseau. Among notable players who were initially unprotected but later added to the list as fills were Rogie Vachon, Claude Larose, Dick Duff, Carol Vadnais, Serge Savard, Danny Grant, Jacques Lemaire and Andre Boudrias.
- New York: goaltender – Ed Giacomin; skaters – Jean Ratelle, Rod Gilbert, Vic Hadfield, Phil Goyette, Arnie Brown, Bob Nevin, Jim Neilson, Harry Howell, Don Marshall, Orland Kurtenbach and Wayne Hillman. Among notable players who were initially unprotected but later added to the list as fills were Gilles Villemure, Red Berenson, Reggie Fleming, Gary Sabourin and Bob Plager.
- Toronto: goaltender – Johnny Bower; skaters – Frank Mahovlich, Dave Keon, Tim Horton, Larry Hillman, Bob Pulford, Jim Pappin, Marcel Pronovost, Mike Walton, Ron Ellis, Pete Stemkowski and Brian Conacher. Among notable players who were initially unprotected but later added to the list as fills were Al Smith, George Armstrong, Allan Stanley, Duane Rupp, Murray Oliver, Bronco Horvath, Don Cherry and Red Kelly.

== Draft results ==
The draft began with the picking of the draft order. The Kings picked first, with the North Stars, Flyers, Penguins, Seals and Blues following in that order.

With the first pick in the draft the Kings chose future Hall of Fame goaltender Terry Sawchuk, backbone of the great Detroit Red Wings teams of the 1950s and fresh off a Stanley Cup championship with the Maple Leafs. The first skater chosen was center Gord Labossiere of the Canadiens, also by the Kings, as the 13th selection.

Commentators compared the draft to a rummage sale, with the Original Six losing only unnecessary if not unwanted players. Some of the expansion teams bolstered their rosters before the draft by purchasing minor league teams outright, thus gaining the rights to the players on their rosters, such as the Springfield Indians of the American Hockey League by the Kings and the Quebec Aces of the AHL by the Flyers, while the North Stars purchased the rights to seven amateur members of the Canadian National Team from Toronto. A poll of minor league sportswriters and executives, following the draft, felt that Philadelphia had gotten the best of the selections and Los Angeles the worst, while the Boston Bruins were the hardest hit of existing clubs. Among the Bruins' players drafted were future Hall of Famer Bernie Parent and future All-Stars J. P. Parise, Poul Popiel, Wayne Connelly, Bill Goldsworthy, Gary Dornhoefer, Ron Schock and Wayne Rivers. It was considered that the Canadiens – reported to have made a number of backroom deals to avoid losing valued unprotected players – fared the best of the established clubs, keeping unprotected talent such as Claude Larose, Carol Vadnais, Serge Savard and Danny Grant.

One controversy arose from the retirement of Toronto star Red Kelly, who was expected to become the Kings' coach. As he was still under contract with the Maple Leafs, they had the rights to his services, but Leafs' general manager Punch Imlach insisted that the Kings use one of their picks to select him, and when this did not materialize, Imlach added Kelly to the Leafs' protected list, forcing the Kings to trade their 15th pick, Ken Block, for Kelly.

Bill Flett and Poul Popiel were the last players selected in the draft to be active in the NHL, both playing for the Edmonton Oilers in the 1979–80 season, while Parent, playing in 551 NHL games (not counting his season in the World Hockey Association) had the longest career of any goaltender selected. Popiel was the last player chosen to be active in professional hockey, playing for the Muskegon Mohawks of the International Hockey League in 1982.

By contrast, Don Caley, the 2nd pick of St. Louis, played only a single game for the Blues, the only game of his NHL career. Career Black Hawk Bill Hay, the 11th pick of the Blues, retired before the draft; nineteen other skaters played 20 or fewer NHL games after the draft.

†	NHL All-Star
‡	NHL All-Star and NHL All-Star team
↑	Inducted into the Hockey Hall of Fame

Round	#	Player	Position	Drafted by	Selected from
1	1	Terry Sawchuk↑‡	Goaltender	Los Angeles Kings	Toronto Maple Leafs
1	2	Bernie Parent↑‡	Goaltender	Philadelphia Flyers	Boston Bruins
1	3	Glenn Hall↑‡	Goaltender	St. Louis Blues	Chicago Black Hawks
1	4	Cesare Maniago	Goaltender	Minnesota North Stars	New York Rangers
1	5	Joe Daley	Goaltender	Pittsburgh Penguins	Detroit Red Wings
1	6	Charlie Hodge‡	Goaltender	California Seals	Montreal Canadiens
2	12	Wayne Rutledge	Goaltender	Los Angeles Kings	New York Rangers
2	9	Garry Bauman†	Goaltender	Minnesota North Stars	Montreal Canadiens
2	11	Doug Favell	Goaltender	Philadelphia Flyers	Boston Bruins
2	8	Roy Edwards	Goaltender	Pittsburgh Penguins	Chicago Black Hawks
2	7	Gary Smith†	Goaltender	California Seals	Toronto Maple Leafs
2	10	Don Caley	Goaltender	St. Louis Blues	Detroit Red Wings
3	13	Gord Labossiere	Centre	Los Angeles Kings	Montreal Canadiens
3	14	Dave Balon†	Left wing	Minnesota North Stars	Montreal Canadiens
3	15	Jim Roberts†	Defence	St. Louis Blues	Montreal Canadiens
3	16	Ed Van Impe†	Defence	Philadelphia Flyers	Chicago Black Hawks
3	17	Earl Ingarfield	Centre	Pittsburgh Penguins	New York Rangers
3	18	Bob Baun†	Defence	California Seals	Toronto Maple Leafs
4	19	Bob Wall	Defence	Los Angeles Kings	Detroit Red Wings
4	20	Ray Cullen	Centre	Minnesota North Stars	Detroit Red Wings
4	21	Joe Watson†	Defence	Philadelphia Flyers	Boston Bruins
4	22	Al MacNeil	Defence	Pittsburgh Penguins	New York Rangers
4	23	Kent Douglas†	Defence	California Seals	Toronto Maple Leafs
4	24	Noel Picard†	Defence	St. Louis Blues	Montreal Canadiens
5	25	Eddie Joyal	Centre	Los Angeles Kings	Toronto Maple Leafs
5	26	Bob Woytowich†	Defence	Minnesota North Stars	Boston Bruins
5	27	Brit Selby	Left wing	Philadelphia Flyers	Toronto Maple Leafs
5	28	Larry Jeffrey	Left wing	Pittsburgh Penguins	Toronto Maple Leafs
5	29	Bill Hicke†	Right wing	California Seals	New York Rangers
5	30	Al Arbour†	Defence	St. Louis Blues	Toronto Maple Leafs
6	31	Real Lemieux	Right wing	Los Angeles Kings	Detroit Red Wings
6	32	Jean-Guy Talbot‡	Defence	Minnesota North Stars	Montreal Canadiens
6	33	Lou Angotti	Right wing	Philadelphia Flyers	Chicago Black Hawks
6	34	Ab McDonald†	Left wing	Pittsburgh Penguins	Detroit Red Wings
6	35	Billy Harris†	Centre	California Seals	Detroit Red Wings
6	36	Rod Seiling†	Defence	St. Louis Blues	New York Rangers
7	37	Poul Popiel	Defence	Los Angeles Kings	Boston Bruins
7	38	Wayne Connelly	Right wing	Minnesota North Stars	Boston Bruins
7	39	Leon Rochefort†	Forward	Philadelphia Flyers	Montreal Canadiens
7	40	Leo Boivin↑†	Defence	Pittsburgh Penguins	Detroit Red Wings
7	41	Larry Cahan	Defence	California Seals	New York Rangers
7	42	Ron Schock	Centre	St. Louis Blues	Boston Bruins
8	43	Terry Gray	Right wing	Los Angeles Kings	Detroit Red Wings
8	44	Ted Taylor	Left wing	Minnesota North Stars	Detroit Red Wings
8	45	Don Blackburn	Left wing	Philadelphia Flyers	Toronto Maple Leafs
8	46	Noel Price†	Defence	Pittsburgh Penguins	Montreal Canadiens
8	47	Wally Boyer	Centre	California Seals	Chicago Black Hawks
8	48	Terry Crisp	Centre	St. Louis Blues	Boston Bruins
9	49	Bryan Campbell	Centre	Los Angeles Kings	New York Rangers
9	50	Pete Goegan	Defence	Minnesota North Stars	Detroit Red Wings
9	51	John Miszuk	Defence	Philadelphia Flyers	Chicago Black Hawks
9	52	Keith McCreary	Left wing	Pittsburgh Penguins	Montreal Canadiens
9	53	Joe Szura	Centre	California Seals	Montreal Canadiens
9	54	Don McKenney†	Centre	St. Louis Blues	Detroit Red Wings
10	55	Ted Irvine	Left wing	Los Angeles Kings	Boston Bruins
10	56	Len Lunde	Left wing	Minnesota North Stars	Chicago Black Hawks
10	57	Garry Peters	Centre	Philadelphia Flyers	Montreal Canadiens
10	58	Ken Schinkel†	Right wing	Pittsburgh Penguins	New York Rangers
10	59	Bob Lemieux	Defence	California Seals	Montreal Canadiens
10	60	Wayne Rivers	Right wing	St. Louis Blues	Boston Bruins
11	61	Howie Hughes	Right wing	Los Angeles Kings	Montreal Canadiens
11	62	Bill Goldsworthy†	Right wing	Minnesota North Stars	Boston Bruins
11	63	Dick Cherry	Defence	Philadelphia Flyers	Boston Bruins
11	64	Bob Dillabough	Centre	Pittsburgh Penguins	Boston Bruins
11	65	J. P. Parise†	Left wing	California Seals	Boston Bruins
11	66	Bill Hay†	Centre	St. Louis Blues	Chicago Black Hawks
12	67	Bill Inglis	Centre	Los Angeles Kings	Montreal Canadiens
12	68	Andre Pronovost†	Left wing	Minnesota North Stars	Detroit Red Wings
12	69	Jean Gauthier	Defence	Philadelphia Flyers	Montreal Canadiens
12	70	Art Stratton	Centre	Pittsburgh Penguins	Chicago Black Hawks
12	71	Ron Harris	Defence	California Seals	Boston Bruins
12	72	Darryl Edestrand	Defence	St. Louis Blues	Toronto Maple Leafs
13	73	Doug Robinson	Left wing	Los Angeles Kings	New York Rangers
13	74	Elmer Vasko‡	Defence	Minnesota North Stars	Chicago Black Hawks
13	75	Jim Johnson	Centre	Philadelphia Flyers	New York Rangers
13	76	Val Fonteyne	Left wing	Pittsburgh Penguins	Detroit Red Wings
13	77	Terry Clancy	Right wing	California Seals	Toronto Maple Leafs
13	78	Norm Beaudin	Right wing	St. Louis Blues	Detroit Red Wings
14	79	Mike Corrigan	Left wing	Los Angeles Kings	Toronto Maple Leafs
14	80	Murray Hall†	Right wing	Minnesota North Stars	Chicago Black Hawks
14	81	Gary Dornhoefer†	Right wing	Philadelphia Flyers	Boston Bruins
14	82	Jeannot Gilbert	Centre	Pittsburgh Penguins	Boston Bruins
14	83	Tracy Pratt†	Defence	California Seals	Chicago Black Hawks
14	84	Larry Keenan	Left wing	St. Louis Blues	Toronto Maple Leafs
15	85	Jacques Lemieux	Defence	Los Angeles Kings	Montreal Canadiens
15	86	Bryan Watson	Defence	Minnesota North Stars	Detroit Red Wings
15	87	Forbes Kennedy	Centre	Philadelphia Flyers	Boston Bruins
15	88	Tom McCarthy	Left wing	Pittsburgh Penguins	Montreal Canadiens
15	89	Aut Erickson	Defence	California Seals	Toronto Maple Leafs
15	90	Ron Stewart†	Centre	St. Louis Blues	Boston Bruins
16	91	Lowell MacDonald†	Right wing	Los Angeles Kings	Toronto Maple Leafs
16	92	Bill Collins	Centre	Minnesota North Stars	New York Rangers
16	93	Pat Hannigan	Left wing	Philadelphia Flyers	Chicago Black Hawks
16	94	Billy Dea	Centre	Pittsburgh Penguins	Chicago Black Hawks
16	95	Ron Boehm	Left wing	California Seals	New York Rangers
16	96	Fred Hucul	Defence	St. Louis Blues	Toronto Maple Leafs
17	97	Ken Block	Defence	Los Angeles Kings	New York Rangers
17	98	Sandy Fitzpatrick	Centre	Minnesota North Stars	New York Rangers
17	99	Dwight Carruthers	Defence	Philadelphia Flyers	Detroit Red Wings
17	100	Bobby Rivard	Centre	Pittsburgh Penguins	Montreal Canadiens
17	101	Alain Caron	Right wing	California Seals	Chicago Black Hawks
17	102	John Brenneman	Left wing	St. Louis Blues	Toronto Maple Leafs
18	103	Bill Flett†	Right wing	Los Angeles Kings	Toronto Maple Leafs
18	104	Parker MacDonald	Left wing	Minnesota North Stars	Detroit Red Wings
18	105	Bob Courcy	Centre	Philadelphia Flyers	Montreal Canadiens
18	106	Mel Pearson	Centre	Pittsburgh Penguins	Chicago Black Hawks
18	107	Mike Laughton	Centre	California Seals	Toronto Maple Leafs
18	108	Gerry Melnyk†	Centre	St. Louis Blues	Chicago Black Hawks
19	109	Brent Hughes	Defence	Los Angeles Kings	Detroit Red Wings
19	110	Billy Taylor	Centre	Minnesota North Stars	Chicago Black Hawks
19	111	Keith Wright	Right wing	Philadelphia Flyers	Boston Bruins
19	112	Andy Bathgate↑‡	Centre	Pittsburgh Penguins	Detroit Red Wings
19	113	Bryan Hextall	Forward	California Seals	New York Rangers
19	114	Gary Veneruzzo	Left wing	St. Louis Blues	Toronto Maple Leafs
20	115	Marc Dufour	Right wing	Los Angeles Kings	New York Rangers
20	116	Dave Richardson	Left wing	Minnesota North Stars	Chicago Black Hawks
20	117	Terry Ball	Defence	Philadelphia Flyers	New York Rangers
20	118	Les Hunt	Defence	Pittsburgh Penguins	New York Rangers
20	119	Gary Kilpatrick	Defence	California Seals	Chicago Black Hawks
20	120	Max Mestinsek	Right wing	St. Louis Blues	New York Rangers

== See also ==
- 1967 NHL amateur draft
- 1967–68 NHL season
