= Lowell MacDonald =

Canadian ice hockey player (1941–2025)

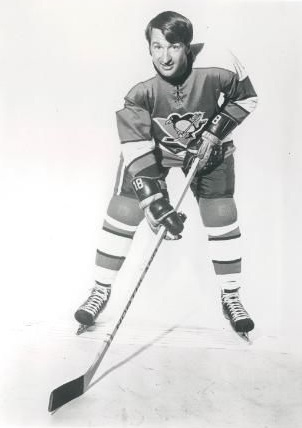
- MacDonald with the Pittsburgh Penguins in the 1970s
- Born: August 30, 1941 Thorburn, Nova Scotia, Canada
- Died: December 28, 2025 (aged 84)
- Height: 5 ft 11 in (180 cm)
- Weight: 185 lb (84 kg; 13 st 3 lb)
- Position: Left wing
- Shot: Right
- Played for: Detroit Red Wings; Los Angeles Kings; Pittsburgh Penguins
- Playing career: 1962–1978

Lowell Wilson MacDonald (August 30, 1941 – December 28, 2025) was a Canadian professional National Hockey League winger who played during the 1960s and 1970s.

== Career ==
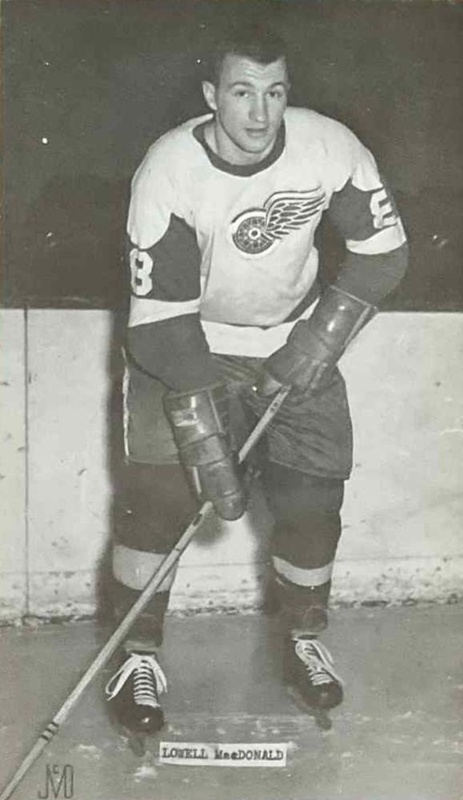
1960s postcard of MacDonald for Detroit Red Wings

MacDonald broke into the NHL with the Detroit Red Wings after being promoted from the AHL's Pittsburgh Hornets. He spent parts of three seasons in the Los Angeles Kings organization but sat out most of the 1970 campaign to work on his college degree. That summer, his former coach with the Kings, Red Kelly, had been hired by the Pittsburgh Penguins and selected MacDonald In the intra-league draft. He played just 10 games for Pittsburgh before an old knee injury flared up and forced him to consider retirement. After sitting out all of the 1971–72 season, his wife, Joyce, cajoled Lowell into attempting a comeback. MacDonald made the Penguins out of training camp and went on to set new career records for goals and points. His stunning return earned MacDonald the 1973 Bill Masterton Memorial Trophy.

In 1973, MacDonald was placed on Pittsburgh's top line alongside Syl Apps Jr. and Jean Pronovost. The 'Century Line', as they would come to be known, would be the driving force for the Penguins for three seasons with MacDonald leading the team in goals in 1974. Unfortunately, his time as a star was cut short when he suffered a seventh knee injury that ended his 1977 season after just 3 games. He returned the following year for a brief stint but ended up retiring before the end of the campaign. In 506 NHL games, MacDonald recorded 180 goals, 210 assists, 390 points, and only 92 penalty minutes.

MacDonald went to college for 14 summers, earning bachelor's and master's degrees, during his playing years. After hanging up his skates, MacDonald became a teacher, hockey head coach and athletic director at the University School of Milwaukee, a prep school in Wisconsin. Over his 18 years with the school, MacDonald compiled a 263–180–17 record and was later inducted into the Wisconsin Hockey Coaches Hall of Fame.

== Personal life and death ==
Two of Lowell's sons had careers involved with ice hockey. Lane had an outstanding college career that saw him win both the NCAA Championship and Hobey Baker Award while at Harvard. Persistent migraines forced Lane to retire in 1991.

Lowell MacDonald died on December 28, 2025, at the age of 84.

== Career statistics ==
			Regular season					Playoffs
Season	Team	League	GP	G	A	Pts	PIM	GP	G	A	Pts	PIM
1959–60	Hamilton Tiger Cubs	OHA-Jr.	48	17	19	36	7	—	—	—	—	—
1960–61	Hamilton Red Wings	OHA-Jr.	48	26	28	54	15	11	6	9	15	4
1961–62	Hamilton Red Wings	OHA-Jr.	50	46	39	85	10	10	7	5	12	8
1961–62	Hamilton Red Wings	M-Cup	—	—	—	—	—	14	17	7	24	14
1961–62	Detroit Red Wings	NHL	1	0	0	0	2	—	—	—	—	—
1962–63	Detroit Red Wings	NHL	26	2	1	3	8	1	0	0	0	2
1962–63	Pittsburgh Hornets	AHL	41	20	19	39	4	—	—	—	—	—
1963–64	Detroit Red Wings	NHL	10	1	4	5	0	—	—	—	—	—
1963–64	Pittsburgh Hornets	AHL	59	31	29	60	6	5	3	1	4	2
1964–65	Detroit Red Wings	NHL	9	2	1	3	0	—	—	—	—	—
1964–65	Pittsburgh Hornets	AHL	59	16	20	36	10	2	0	0	0	0
1965–66	Rochester Americans	AHL	1	0	0	0	0	—	—	—	—	—
1965–66	Tulsa Oilers	CPHL	57	33	25	58	4	11	5	4	9	0
1966–67	Tulsa Oilers	CPHL	33	14	17	31	8	—	—	—	—	—
1967–68	Los Angeles Kings	NHL	74	21	24	45	12	7	3	4	7	2
1968–69	Los Angeles Kings	NHL	58	14	14	28	10	7	2	3	5	0
1968–69	Springfield Kings	AHL	9	6	9	15	0	—	—	—	—	—
1969–70	Springfield Kings	AHL	14	4	3	7	0	3	0	0	0	0
1970–71	Pittsburgh Penguins	NHL	10	0	1	1	0	—	—	—	—	—
1972–73	Pittsburgh Penguins	NHL	78	34	41	75	8	—	—	—	—	—
1973–74	Pittsburgh Penguins	NHL	78	43	39	82	14	—	—	—	—	—
1974–75	Pittsburgh Penguins	NHL	71	27	33	60	24	9	4	2	6	4
1975–76	Pittsburgh Penguins	NHL	69	30	43	73	12	3	1	0	1	0
1976–77	Pittsburgh Penguins	NHL	3	1	1	2	0	3	1	2	3	4
1977–78	Pittsburgh Penguins	NHL	19	5	8	13	2	—	—	—	—	—
NHL totals			506	180	210	390	92	30	11	11	22	12

== Awards ==
- OHA-Jr. First All-Star Team (1962)
- Bill Masterton Memorial Trophy (1973)
- NHL All-Star Game (1973, 1974)

== Transactions ==
- May 20, 1965 – Traded to Toronto by Detroit with Marcel Pronovost, Eddie Joyal, Larry Jeffrey and Aut Erickson for Andy Bathgate, Billy Harris and Gary Jarrett.
- June 6, 1967 – Claimed by Los Angeles from Toronto in 1967 NHL Expansion Draft.
- June 9, 1970 – Claimed by Pittsburgh from Los Angeles in a 1970 NHL Intra-League Draft.
- October 21, 1970 – Missed majority of 1970–71 and entire 1971–72 due to knee injury vs. Los Angeles.
- December 10, 1975 – Missed majority of 1976–77 and 1977–78 due to shoulder injury originally vs. Detroit.
