= Billy Harris (ice hockey, born 1935) =

Canadian ice hockey player (1935–2001)

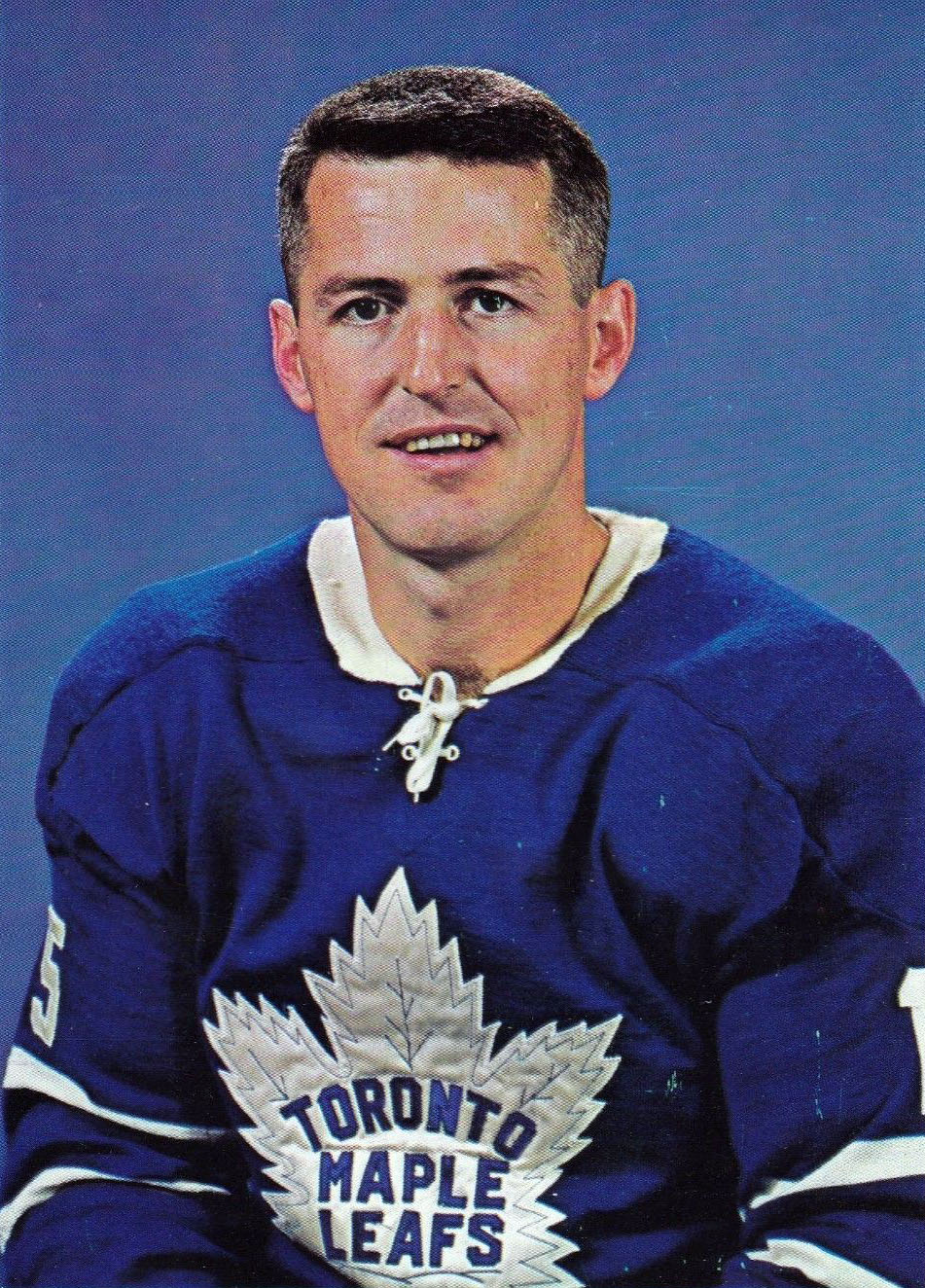
- Billy Harris in the mid 1960s
- Born: July 29, 1935 Toronto, Ontario, Canada
- Died: September 20, 2001 (aged 66) Toronto, Ontario, Canada
- Height: 6 ft 0 in (183 cm)
- Weight: 157 lb (71 kg; 11 st 3 lb)
- Position: Centre
- Shot: Left
- Played for: NHL; Toronto Maple Leafs; Detroit Red Wings; Oakland Seals; Pittsburgh Penguins; AHL; Rochester Americans; Pittsburgh Hornets
- Coached for: Ottawa Nationals; Toronto Toros
- Playing career: 1955–1969
- Coaching career: 1971–1984

William Edward "Hinky" Harris (July 29, 1935 – September 20, 2001) was a Canadian professional ice hockey player in the National Hockey League (NHL) from 1955 to 1969.

== Playing career ==
Harris began his NHL career with the Toronto Maple Leafs in 1955–56. He helped Toronto win 3 straight Stanley Cups in 1962, 1963, and 1964. In total, he played 10 seasons with Toronto before being traded in the off season to the Detroit Red Wings along with Andy Bathgate and Gary Jarrett for Larry Jeffrey, Eddie Joyal, Lowell MacDonald, Marcel Pronovost, and Autry Erickson on May 20, 1965. After playing 24 games for Detroit in 1965–66 he was sent down to the Red Wings AHL affiliate Pittsburgh Hornets. He spent the entire 1966–67 season in the AHL with Pittsburgh leading the team with 34 goals and helping them win the Calder Cup Championship.

The following year the National Hockey League expanded from six teams to twelve and on June 6, 1967 Harris was selected by the Oakland Seals in the expansion draft. During his second season with Oakland he was traded to the Pittsburgh Penguins for Bob Dillabough. Harris would retire from professional hockey at the conclusion of the 1968–69 NHL season.

== Coaching career ==
After finishing his playing career in 1970 with the Canadian national team, Harris became head coach of the Swedish national ice hockey team in 1971–72. He then became the first head coach of the Ottawa Nationals in the WHA's inaugural 1972–73 season and coached Team Canada in the 1974 Summit Series against the Soviet Union.

Harris went on to become an assistant coach with the Edmonton Oilers under Glen Sather for two seasons beginning in 1981–82.

He ended his coaching career after serving as a head coach in the OHL for the Sudbury Wolves in 1982–83 and 1983–84.

In later years, Harris and Dave Keon operated one of Canada's biggest hockey schools.

== Awards and achievements ==
- 1961–62 – Stanley Cup Champion – Toronto Maple Leafs
- 1962–63 – Stanley Cup Champion – Toronto Maple Leafs
- 1963–64 – Stanley Cup Champion – Toronto Maple Leafs
- 1966-67 - AHL Champion – Pittsburgh Hornets

== Transactions ==
- May 20, 1965 – Traded by the Toronto Maple Leafs with Andy Bathgate and Gary Jarrett to the Detroit Red Wings for Larry Jeffrey, Eddie Joyal, Lowell MacDonald, Marcel Pronovost and Aut Erickson
- June 6, 1967 – Claimed by the Oakland Seals from the Detroit Red Wings in NHL expansion draft
- November 28, 1968 – Traded by the Oakland Seals to the Pittsburgh Penguins for Bob Dillabough

== Career statistics ==
=== Regular season and playoffs ===
			Regular season					Playoffs
Season	Team	League	GP	G	A	Pts	PIM	GP	G	A	Pts	PIM
1950–51	Weston Dukes	B10 Jr. B	18	6	14	20	2	12	8	9	17	4
1950–51	Toronto Marlboros	OHA	2	0	1	1	0	—	—	—	—	—
1951–52	Weston Dukes	B10 Jr. B	—	—	—	—	—	—	—	—	—	—
1951–52	Toronto Marlboros	OHA	3	0	1	1	0	—	—	—	—	—
1952–53	Toronto Marlboros	OHA	56	20	31	51	4	7	2	1	3	4
1953–54	Toronto Marlboros	OHA	59	25	39	64	27	15	4	6	10	20
1954–55	Toronto Marlboros	OHA	47	37	29	66	26	13	10	18	28	11
1954–55	Toronto Marlboros	M-Cip	—	—	—	—	—	11	5	6	11	0
1955–56	Toronto Maple Leafs	NHL	70	9	13	22	8	5	1	0	1	4
1956–57	Toronto Maple Leafs	NHL	23	4	6	10	6	—	—	—	—	—
1956–57	Rochester Americans	AHL	43	5	20	25	15	2	0	0	0	4
1957–58	Toronto Maple Leafs	NHL	68	16	28	44	32	—	—	—	—	—
1958–59	Toronto Maple Leafs	NHL	70	22	30	52	29	12	3	4	7	16
1959–60	Toronto Maple Leafs	NHL	70	13	25	38	29	9	0	3	3	4
1960–61	Toronto Maple Leafs	NHL	66	12	27	39	30	5	1	0	1	0
1961–62	Toronto Maple Leafs	NHL	67	15	10	25	14	12	2	1	3	2
1962–63	Toronto Maple Leafs	NHL	65	8	24	32	22	10	0	1	1	0
1963–64	Toronto Maple Leafs	NHL	63	6	12	18	17	9	1	1	2	4
1964–65	Toronto Maple Leafs	NHL	48	1	6	7	0	—	—	—	—	—
1964–65	Rochester Americans	AHL	11	4	10	14	6	10	5	12	17	10
1965–66	Detroit Red Wings	NHL	24	1	4	5	6	—	—	—	—	—
1965–66	Pittsburgh Hornets	AHL	42	15	22	37	2	3	0	0	0	2
1966–67	Pittsburgh Hornets	AHL	70	34	36	70	29	9	2	6	8	6
1967–68	Oakland Seals	NHL	62	12	17	29	2	—	—	—	—	—
1968–69	Oakland Seals	NHL	19	0	4	4	2	—	—	—	—	—
1968–69	Pittsburgh Penguins	NHL	54	7	13	20	8	—	—	—	—	—
NHL totals			769	126	219	345	205	62	8	10	18	30

== Coaching record ==
Team	Year	Regular season						Postseason
Team	Year	G	W	L	T	Pts	Finish	Result
Ottawa Nationals	1972–73	78	35	39	4	74	4th in WHA East	Lost in division semi-finals (1-4 vs. NE)
Toronto Toros	1973–74	78	41	33	4	86	2nd in WHA East	Won in division semi-finals (4-1 vs. CLE); Lost in division finals (3-4 vs. CHI)
Toronto Toros	1974–75	41	23	17	1	(47)	2nd in WHA Canadian	Fired
WHA totals	1972-1975	197	99	89	9	207		8-9 (0.471)

== Death ==
Harris died as a result of cancer / leukemia, in Toronto, Ontario, on September 20, 2001. He was 66 years old.
