= Aut Erickson =

Canadian ice hockey player

- Born: January 25, 1938 Lethbridge, Alberta, Canada
- Died: August 21, 2010 (aged 72) Moreno Valley, California, U.S.
- Height: 6 ft 0 in (183 cm)
- Weight: 180 lb (82 kg; 12 st 12 lb)
- Position: Defence
- Shot: Left
- Played for: Chicago Black Hawks; Boston Bruins; Toronto Maple Leafs; Oakland Seals
- Playing career: 1955–1970

Autry Raymond Erickson (January 25, 1938 – August 21, 2010) was a professional ice hockey player who played 226 games in the National Hockey League. He played with the Chicago Black Hawks, Boston Bruins, Toronto Maple Leafs, and Oakland Seals. He won the Stanley Cup in 1967 with the Toronto Maple Leafs, playing no regular season games, and only three playoff games.

Aut Erickson wore number 11 when he joined the Boston Bruins in 1959-60. The lanky young rearguard, known as a steady, dependable blueliner, would play two full seasons in Boston, establishing his rock solid, robust and rugged minded defensive presence. In May 1965, the Detroit Red Wings traded Erickson, Larry Jeffrey, Marcel Pronovost, Ed Joyal, and Lowell MacDonald to the Toronto Maple Leafs for Andy Bathgate, Billy Harris, and Gary Jarrett. Erickson played in the 1967 Stanley Cup Final while with the Maple Leafs. Erickson was an original member of the expansion Oakland Seals.

Erickson died in August 2010 after a long battle with cancer.

== Career statistics ==
=== Regular season and playoffs ===
| | | | Regular season | | | | | Playoffs |
| Season | Team | League | GP | G | A | Pts | PIM | GP | G | A | Pts | PIM |
|---|---|---|---|---|---|---|---|---|---|---|---|---|
| 1954–55 | Lethbridge Native Sons | WJCHL | 39 | 3 | 2 | 5 | 54 | 11 | 0 | 2 | 2 | 2 |
| 1955–56 | Lethbridge Native Sons | WJCHL | 47 | 6 | 14 | 20 | 75 | 11 | 6 | 2 | 8 | 14 |
| 1955–56 | Saskatoon Quakers | WHL | 1 | 0 | 0 | 0 | 0 | — | — | — | — | — |
| 1956–57 | Prince Albert Mintos | SJHL | 49 | 12 | 15 | 27 | 159 | 13 | 4 | 5 | 9 | 4 |
| 1957–58 | Prince Albert Mintos | SJHL | 47 | 14 | 32 | 46 | 108 | 6 | 0 | 4 | 4 | 7 |
| 1957–58 | Saskatoon Regals/Saint Paul Saints | WHL | 2 | 0 | 0 | 0 | 0 | — | — | — | — | — |
| 1957–58 | Regina Pats | SJHL | — | — | — | — | — | 16 | 6 | 8 | 14 | 16 |
| 1958–59 | Calgary Stampeders | WHL | 62 | 4 | 15 | 19 | 93 | 8 | 0 | 1 | 1 | 4 |
| 1959–60 | Boston Bruins | NHL | 58 | 1 | 6 | 7 | 29 | — | — | — | — | — |
| 1960–61 | Boston Bruins | NHL | 68 | 2 | 6 | 8 | 65 | — | — | — | — | — |
| 1961–62 | Buffalo Bisons | AHL | 64 | 7 | 23 | 30 | 88 | 11 | 1 | 1 | 2 | 6 |
| 1962–63 | Chicago Black Hawks | NHL | 3 | 0 | 0 | 0 | 0 | — | — | — | — | — |
| 1962–63 | Buffalo Bisons | AHL | 68 | 3 | 19 | 22 | 97 | 12 | 0 | 4 | 4 | 25 |
| 1963–64 | Chicago Black Hawks | NHL | 31 | 0 | 1 | 1 | 34 | 6 | 0 | 0 | 0 | 0 |
| 1963–64 | Buffalo Bisons | AHL | 34 | 3 | 13 | 16 | 36 | — | — | — | — | — |
| 1964–65 | Pittsburgh Hornets | AHL | 64 | 3 | 19 | 22 | 94 | 4 | 0 | 0 | 0 | 6 |
| 1965–66 | Victoria Maple Leafs | WHL | 65 | 7 | 14 | 21 | 109 | 14 | 1 | 5 | 6 | 10 |
| 1966–67 | Victoria Maple Leafs | WHL | 70 | 8 | 28 | 36 | 76 | — | — | — | — | — |
| 1966–67 | Toronto Maple Leafs | NHL | — | — | — | — | — | 1 | 0 | 0 | 0 | 2 |
| 1967–68 | California/Oakland Seals | NHL | 65 | 4 | 11 | 15 | 46 | — | — | — | — | — |
| 1968–69 | Phoenix Roadrunners | WHL | 68 | 8 | 29 | 37 | 83 | — | — | — | — | — |
| 1969–70 | Oakland Seals | NHL | 1 | 0 | 0 | 0 | 0 | — | — | — | — | — |
| 1969–70 | Phoenix Roadrunners | WHL | 18 | 0 | 4 | 4 | 8 | — | — | — | — | — |
| NHL totals | | | 226 | 7 | 24 | 31 | 182 | 7 | 0 | 0 | 0 | 2 |
