= Larry Jeffrey =

Canadian ice hockey player (1940–2022)

- Born: October 12, 1940 Goderich, Ontario, Canada
- Died: July 18, 2022 (aged 81) Goderich, Ontario, Canada
- Height: 5 ft 11 in (180 cm)
- Weight: 189 lb (86 kg; 13 st 7 lb)
- Position: Left wing
- Shot: Left
- Played for: Detroit Red Wings; Toronto Maple Leafs; New York Rangers
- Playing career: 1958–1969

Lawrence Joseph Jeffrey (October 12, 1940 – July 18, 2022) was a Canadian professional ice hockey player, who played forward. He played for the Detroit Red Wings, Toronto Maple Leafs, and New York Rangers of the National Hockey League from 1961 to 1969. Jeffrey was a member of the 1967 Stanley Cup-winning Maple Leafs.

== Career ==
Jeffrey was from Goderich, Ontario. He began playing junior ice hockey in 1956, spending five years with the Hamilton Tiger Cubs and Hamilton Red Wings of the Ontario Hockey Association. He then played for the Hershey Bears of the American Hockey League (AHL), and the Edmonton Flyers of the Western Hockey League (WHL). He won the WHL's rookie of the year award. With Hamilton, Jeffrey suffered a knee injury that tore a ligament and required surgery. Jeffrey made his National Hockey League (NHL) debut with the Detroit Red Wings in the 1961–62 season, playing in 18 regular season games. He was injured in a practice and had his second knee surgery to repair a torn ligament.

In May 1965, the Red Wings traded Jeffrey, Marcel Pronovost, Aut Erickson, Eddie Joyal, and Lowell MacDonald to the Toronto Maple Leafs for Andy Bathgate, Billy Harris, and Gary Jarrett. After struggling with coach Punch Imlach for a season, Jeffrey requested a trade, and Toronto assigned Jeffrey to the Rochester Americans of the AHL. After the Americans won the Calder Cup, the Maple Leafs promoted Jeffrey. Jeffrey played for the Maple Leafs in the 1967 Stanley Cup playoffs, though he injured his leg again in the semifinals against the Chicago Black Hawks, before the Maple Leafs defeated the Montreal Canadiens in the 1967 Stanley Cup Final. He participated in the trophy presentation on Maple Leaf Gardens ice following the decisive game six, wearing a suit and on crutches.

The Pittsburgh Penguins selected Jeffrey from the Maple Leafs in the 1967 NHL Expansion Draft and traded him to the New York Rangers for three minor league players. In June 1969, the Rangers traded Jeffrey to the Red Wings for Terry Sawchuk and Sandy Snow. Jeffrey fractured his kneecap during the preseason, requiring surgery, and retired as a player in 1969 due to the worsening chronic pain in his knee. Jeffrey had 11 knee surgeries over the course of nine years, and 14 knee surgeries in total. He played in 368 NHL games, scoring 39 goals and 62 assists. He had four goals and 10 assists in 38 postseason games. Jeffrey worked as a scout for eight years after his playing career.

== Personal life ==
Jeffrey married Sharon Somerville in 1964, and they had two children. He raised horses and Hereford cattle on his 120-acre (49 ha) farm north of Goderich.

Jeffrey died in Goderich on July 18, 2022, at age 81.

== Career statistics ==
=== Regular season and playoffs ===
			Regular season					Playoffs
Season	Team	League	GP	G	A	Pts	PIM	GP	G	A	Pts	PIM
1957–58	Hamilton Kilty B's	OHA-B	—	—	—	—	—	—	—	—	—	—
1957–58	Hamilton Tiger Cubs	OHA	—	—	—	—	—	9	0	0	0	0
1958–59	Hamilton Tiger Cubs	OHA	54	21	20	41	149	—	—	—	—	—
1959–60	Hamilton Tiger Cubs	OHA	46	14	24	38	84	—	—	—	—	—
1959–60	Hershey Bears	AHL	5	0	3	3	2	—	—	—	—	—
1960–61	Hamilton Red Wings	OHA	48	28	32	60	105	12	6	3	9	39
1961–62	Detroit Red Wings	NHL	18	5	3	8	20	—	—	—	—	—
1961–62	Edmonton Flyers	WHL	48	20	22	42	80	—	—	—	—	—
1962–63	Detroit Red Wings	NHL	53	5	11	16	62	9	3	3	6	8
1962–63	Pittsburgh Hornets	AHL	21	14	7	21	12	—	—	—	—	—
1963–64	Detroit Red Wings	NHL	58	10	18	28	87	14	1	6	7	28
1964–65	Detroit Red Wings	NHL	41	4	2	6	48	2	0	0	0	0
1965–66	Toronto Maple Leafs	NHL	20	1	1	2	22	—	—	—	—	—
1965–66	Rochester Americans	AHL	51	10	20	30	36	12	6	5	11	4
1966–67	Toronto Maple Leafs	NHL	56	11	17	28	27	6	0	1	1	4
1967–68	New York Rangers	NHL	47	2	4	6	15	3	0	0	0	0
1968–69	New York Rangers	NHL	75	1	6	7	12	4	0	0	0	2
NHL totals			368	39	62	101	293	38	4	10	14	42
