= 11th National Hockey League All-Star Game =

Professional ice hockey exhibition game

11th NHL All-Star Game
	1	2	3	Total
All-Star team	2	1	2	5
Montreal Canadiens	1	2	0	3
- Date: October 5, 1957
- Arena: Montreal Forum
- City: Montreal
- Attendance: 13,003

The 11th National Hockey League All-Star Game took place at the Montreal Forum, home of the Montreal Canadiens, on October 5, 1957. The Canadiens, winner of the 1957 Stanley Cup Finals, played a team of All-Stars for the second consecutive year, with the All-Stars winning by a 5–3 score.

== Boxscore ==
	NHL All-Stars	Montreal Canadiens
Final score	5	3
Head coach	Milt Schmidt (Boston Bruins)	Toe Blake (Montreal Canadiens)
Lineup	Starting lineup: 1 - G Glenn Hall (Detroit Red Wings); 3 - D Jim Morrison (Toronto Maple Leafs); 4 - D Red Kelly (Detroit Red Wings); 5 - RW Andy Bathgate (New York Rangers); 6 - D Marcel Pronovost (Detroit Red Wings); 7 - LW Ted Lindsay (Detroit Red Wings); 8 - LW Dick Duff (Toronto Maple Leafs); 9 - RW Gordie Howe (Detroit Red Wings); 10 - C Alex Delvecchio (Detroit Red Wings); 11 - LW Ed Litzenberger (Chicago Black Hawks); 12 - LW Real Chevrefils (Boston Bruins); 14 - D Fern Flaman (Boston Bruins); 15 - LW Dean Prentice (New York Rangers); 16 - C Rudy Migay (Toronto Maple Leafs); 17 - RW George Armstrong (Toronto Maple Leafs); 18 - C Don McKenney (Boston Bruins); 19 - D Allan Stanley (Boston Bruins); 24 - D Bill Gadsby (New York Rangers)	Starting lineup: 1 - G Jacques Plante; 2 - D Doug Harvey; 4 - C Jean Beliveau; 6 - RW Floyd Curry; 8 - LW Stan Smrke; 9 - RW Maurice Richard, C; 10 - D Tom Johnson; 11 - D Bob Turner; 12 - RW Dickie Moore; 14 - RW Claude Provost; 15 - LW Bert Olmstead; 16 - C Henri Richard; 17 - D Jean-Guy Talbot; 18 - LW Marcel Bonin; 19 - D Dollard St. Laurent; 20 - C Phil Goyette; 22 - LW Don Marshall; 23 - LW Andre Pronovost
Scoring summary	Kelly (Unassisted), 1:06 1st; Stanley (Prentice, Migay), 19:55 1st (SHG); Bathgate (Litzenberger, Prentice), 18:14 2nd; Howe (Chevrefils, Morrison), 8:11 3rd (PPG); Prentice (Bathgate, Litzenberger), 16:50 3rd	M. Richard (H. Richard, Moore), 10:53 1st; Olmstead, (Johnson), 0:33 2nd; Smrke (Bonin), 9:13 2nd
Penalties	Migay, 5:36 1st; Howe, 15:55 1st; Howe, 19:14 1st; Chevrefils, 12:36 2nd; Flaman, 5:48 3rd; Flaman, 9:46 3rd	Talbot, 14:25 1st; Harvey, 16:05 1st; Talbot, 5:54 2nd; Johnson, 18:59 2nd; Olmstead, 6:24 3rd
Win/loss	W - Glenn Hall	L - Jacques Plante

- Referee: Red Storey
- Linesmen: Doug Davies, Bill Roberts

== Notes ==
- ^1Named to the first All-Star team in 1956–57.
- ^2Named to the second All-Star team in 1956–57.
