= Kent Douglas =

Canadian ice hockey defenseman (1936-2009)

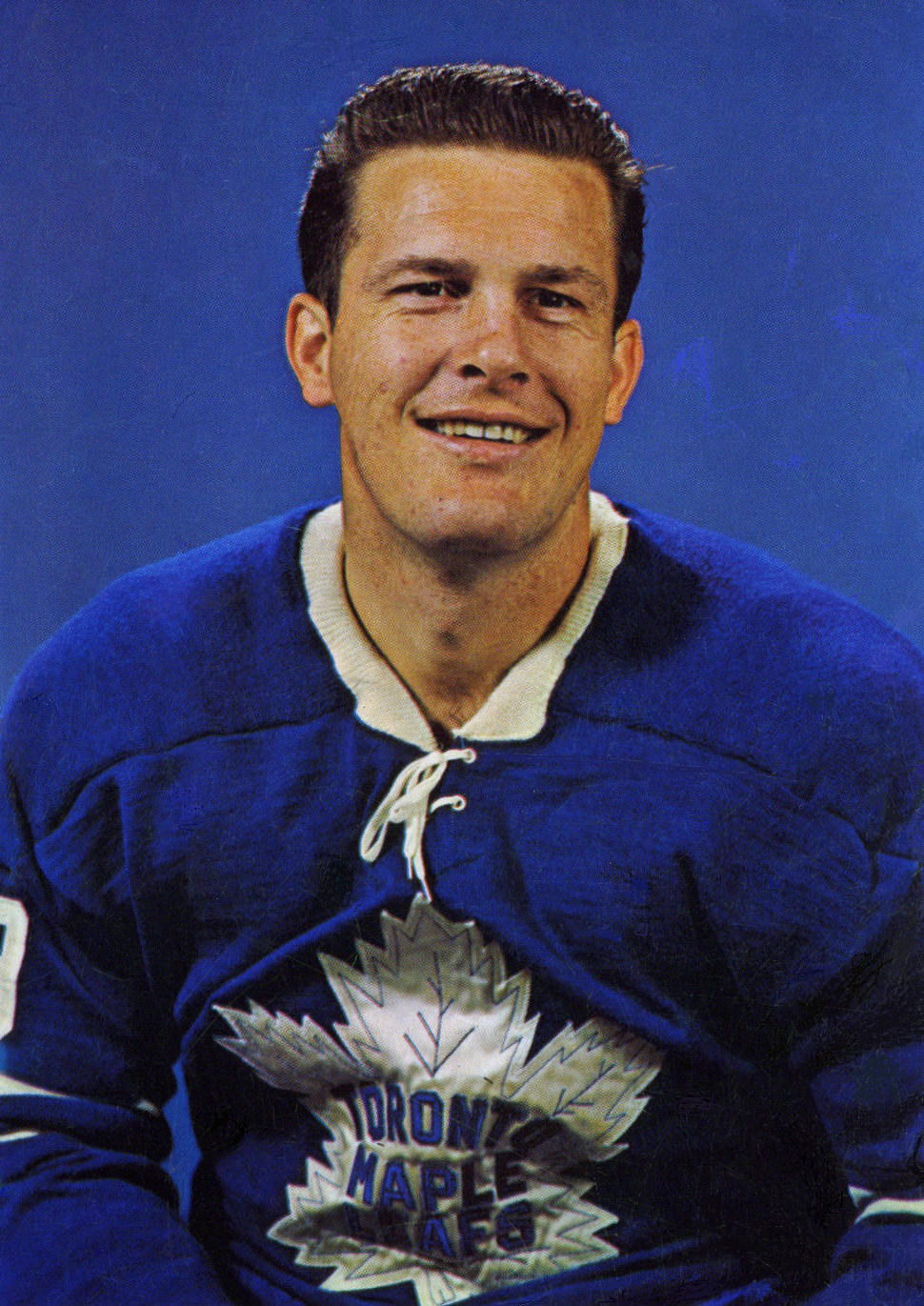
- Born: February 6, 1936 Cobalt, Ontario, Canada
- Died: April 12, 2009 (aged 73) Wasaga Beach, Ontario, Canada
- Height: 5 ft 10 in (178 cm)
- Weight: 180 lb (82 kg; 12 st 12 lb)
- Position: Defence
- Shot: Left
- Played for: Toronto Maple Leafs; Oakland Seals; Detroit Red Wings; New York Raiders
- Playing career: 1956–1976

Kent Gemmell Douglas (February 6, 1936 – April 12, 2009) was a Canadian professional ice hockey defenceman and coach.

== Playing career ==
=== Early career ===
Douglas started his career with the Kitchener Canucks in the Ontario Hockey Association. He spent two seasons with the Canucks and eight seasons in the American Hockey League and the Western Hockey League with the Springfield Indians, Winnipeg Warriors and the Vancouver Canucks. In Springfield, Douglas came under the tutelage of Hall of Famer Eddie Shore, the then owner of the Indians. There, Douglas learned Shore's tough defensive style of play which contributed to the Indians three consecutive Calder Cup championships from 1960 to 1962.

=== Later years ===
In 1962–63, Douglas made his first trip to the National Hockey League. He played with the Toronto Maple Leafs and continued his aggressive style of play during his rookie season in the NHL. In 70 games, Douglas recorded 22 points and 105 PIM. The Leafs, that year, made it to the Stanley Cup Final, where they played the Detroit Red Wings. Toronto defeated the Red Wings in five games, giving Douglas a Stanley Cup in his first season in the NHL. Douglas was also awarded the Calder Memorial Trophy as rookie of the year in the NHL, making him the first defenceman to do so. The following season, Douglas split his time between the Leafs and the Rochester Americans of the AHL. He played 41 games with the Leafs and 27 games with the Americans that season. In his 41 games with the Leafs, he recorded only one point.

Douglas remained with the Leafs organization through the 1966–67 but was not a member of the 1964 and 1967 Stanley Cup teams, as he was assigned to Rochester of the AHL for the playoffs in those two years. In the 1967 expansion draft, Douglas was claimed by the California Seals in the 1967 NHL Expansion Draft. The California Seals changed their name before the start of the 1967-68 season to the Oakland Seals. Douglas played 40 games with the Seals before being traded to the Detroit Red Wings. Douglas played the remainder of the season and the 1968–69 season with the Red Wings. He was sent down to the AHL again the following year with the Rochester Americans. Douglas stayed in the AHL for the next three seasons, making the Calder Cup Finals with the Baltimore Clippers in 1971–72. In 1972–73 Douglas joined the New York Raiders in the World Hockey Association. Douglas played one season with the Raiders before returning to the minor leagues once again. He played three more seasons before retiring.

Douglas died of cancer in 2009 at the age of 73.

== Awards and achievements ==
- Calder Cup Championships (1960, 1961, & 1962)
- AHL First All-Star Team (1962)
- Eddie Shore Award (1962)
- Calder Memorial Trophy (1963)
- Played in NHL All-Star Game (1962, 1963 & 1964)
- Stanley Cup Championship (1963)
- AHL Second All-Star Team (1971)

== Career statistics ==
=== Regular season and playoffs ===
			Regular season					Playoffs
Season	Team	League	GP	G	A	Pts	PIM	GP	G	A	Pts	PIM
1954–55	Kitchener Canucks	OHA-Jr.	21	2	5	7	104	—	—	—	—	—
1955–56	Kitchener Canucks	OHA-Jr.	48	16	22	38	193	8	3	1	4	40
1955–56	Springfield Indians	AHL	3	1	0	1	4	—	—	—	—	—
1956–57	Owen Sound Mercurys	OHA-Sr.	52	9	4	13	205	—	—	—	—	—
1957–58	Winnipeg Warriors	WHL	68	10	24	34	135	7	0	1	1	25
1958–59	Vancouver Canucks	WHL	48	14	12	26	144	—	—	—	—	—
1958–59	Springfield Indians	AHL	9	2	4	6	28	—	—	—	—	—
1959–60	Springfield Indians	AHL	67	12	18	30	157	10	1	4	5	45
1960–61	Springfield Indians	AHL	65	8	28	36	138	8	1	1	2	14
1961–62	Springfield Indians	AHL	59	18	41	59	151	11	2	8	10	10
1962–63	Toronto Maple Leafs	NHL	70	7	15	22	105	10	1	1	2	0
1963–64	Toronto Maple Leafs	NHL	43	0	1	1	29	—	—	—	—	—
1963–64	Rochester Americans	AHL	27	6	13	19	38	2	0	1	1	2
1964–65	Toronto Maple Leafs	NHL	67	5	23	28	129	5	0	1	1	29
1965–66	Toronto Maple Leafs	NHL	64	6	14	20	97	4	0	1	1	12
1966–67	Toronto Maple Leafs	NHL	39	2	12	14	48	—	—	—	—	—
1966–67	Rochester Americans	AHL	11	7	9	16	6	10	3	3	6	6
1966–67	Tulsa Oilers	CPHL	13	1	2	3	21	—	—	—	—	—
1967–68	Oakland Seals	NHL	40	4	11	15	80	—	—	—	—	—
1967–68	Detroit Red Wings	NHL	36	7	10	17	46	—	—	—	—	—
1968–69	Detroit Red Wings	NHL	69	2	29	31	97	—	—	—	—	—
1969–70	Rochester Americans	AHL	64	9	31	40	145	—	—	—	—	—
1970–71	Baltimore Clippers	AHL	71	9	36	45	72	6	1	3	4	16
1971–72	Baltimore Clippers	AHL	75	6	31	37	180	18	0	4	4	26
1972–73	New York Raiders	WHA	60	3	15	18	74	—	—	—	—	—
1972–73	Long Island Ducks	EHL	1	0	0	0	0	—	—	—	—	—
1973–74	Baltimore Clippers	AHL	71	7	46	53	176	9	2	4	6	34
1974–75	Baltimore Clippers	AHL	37	5	19	24	67	—	—	—	—	—
1974–75	Toledo Goaldiggers	IHL	22	2	9	11	10	19	2	7	9	6
1975–76	Baltimore Clippers	AHL	66	5	33	38	140	—	—	—	—	—
AHL totals			625	95	309	404	1302	74	10	28	38	153
WHA totals			60	3	15	18	74	—	—	—	—	—
NHL totals			428	33	115	148	631	19	1	3	4	33

Preceded by Bobby Rousseau	Winner of the Calder Memorial Trophy; 1963	Succeeded by Jacques Laperrière
