= Marcel Pronovost =

Canadian ice hockey player (1930–2015)

- Hockey Hall of Fame, 1978
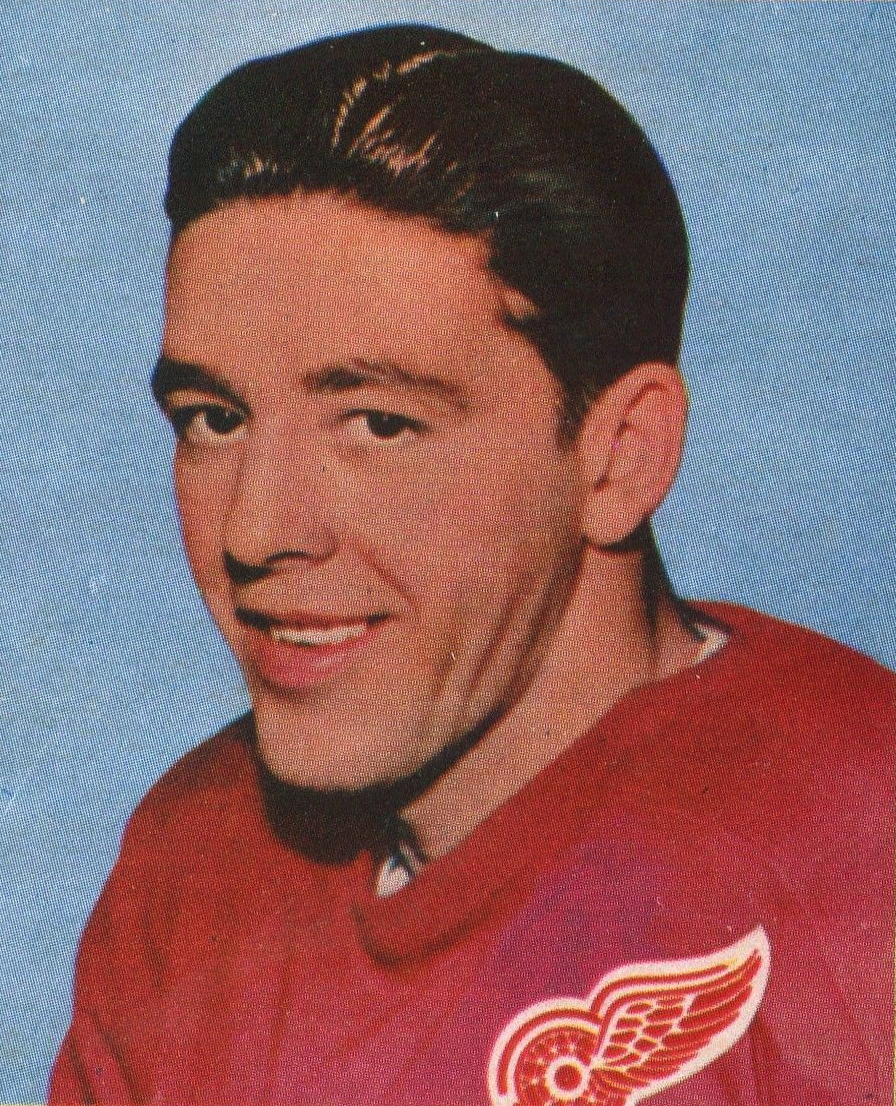
- Pronovost with the Detroit Red Wings in 1957
- Born: June 15, 1930 Lac-à-la-Tortue, Quebec, Canada
- Died: April 26, 2015 (aged 84) Windsor, Ontario, Canada
- Height: 5 ft 11 in (180 cm)
- Weight: 180 lb (82 kg; 12 st 12 lb)
- Position: Defence
- Shot: Left
- Played for: Detroit Red Wings; Toronto Maple Leafs
- Playing career: 1949–1970

Joseph René Marcel Pronovost (June 15, 1930 – April 26, 2015) was a Canadian professional ice hockey player and coach. He played in 1,206 games over 20 National Hockey League (NHL) seasons for the Detroit Red Wings and Toronto Maple Leafs between 1950 and 1970. A top defenceman, Pronovost was named to four post-season NHL All-Star teams and played in 11 All-Star Games. He was a member of four Stanley Cup championship teams with the Red Wings, the first in 1950, and won a fifth title with the Maple Leafs in 1967. Pronovost was inducted into the Hockey Hall of Fame as a player in 1978.

Pronovost began coaching in 1969 and spent several seasons behind the bench of the junior Hull Olympiques and Windsor Spitfires. He was head coach of the Chicago Cougars in the World Hockey Association's inaugural season in 1972–73, coached 104 games in the NHL for the Buffalo Sabres between 1977 and 1978 and was briefly an associate coach of the Red Wings. Pronovost worked for the NHL Central Scouting Bureau for five years until 1990, when he was hired as a scout for the New Jersey Devils, with whom he was a member of three Stanley Cup championship teams, with the last coming in 2003. The 53-year span between his first championship and his last is a Stanley Cup record.

== Early life ==
Pronovost was born June 15, 1930, in the community of Lac-à-la-Tortue, Quebec. He was the third of 12 children, nine boys and three girls, of Leo and Juliette Pronovost. Leo was a construction worker who worked with aluminum and occasionally moved around; the family settled in the nearby town of Shawinigan Falls by the time Marcel was five years old.

Cross-country skiing was Pronovost's first sport, but he quickly developed a passion for hockey. He began skating at the age of three years and was playing competitive hockey by age five. Pronovost played and studied at College Immaculate Conception Superior School (CIC) in Shawinigan Falls where he played centre and left wing. His team won the Quebec provincial midget hockey championship in 1944–45. It was with CIC that Pronovost was discovered by National Hockey League (NHL) scouts. The Detroit Red Wings sent scout Marcel Côté to sign Larry and John Wilson at a Quebec tournament. Larry suggested that Côté observe Pronovost. As a result, he was also signed to the Red Wings.

Hockey was a significant part of life for the Pronovosts, and two of Marcel's brothers followed him to the NHL: Claude was a goaltender who played three games and Jean played nearly 1,000 at forward. In his autobiography, A Life in Hockey, Marcel argued that the NHL having only six teams until 1967 prevented some of his other brothers from reaching the league.

== Playing career ==
The Red Wings placed Pronovost with the Windsor Spitfires, one of their junior teams in the Ontario Hockey Association (OHA), beginning in 1947–48. The Spitfires were a dominant team that season; Windsor finished with the best record in the OHA but lost the championship series to the Barrie Flyers after Detroit was forced to recall Windsor's goaltender, Terry Sawchuk, to one of their minor league teams. Pronovost believed that the Spitfires would have won the league title and gone on to play for the Memorial Cup if they hadn't lost Sawchuk. At the same time, Pronovost also played for the Detroit Auto Club team in the International Hockey League (IHL). At the time an amateur league, the IHL based most of its teams in Detroit or Windsor and the majority of players were affiliated with the Red Wings. Playing in the two leagues prepared Pronovost for the rigors of an NHL schedule. He played 52 games that season, and 51 in 1948–49. Pronovost permanently moved to defence during his tenure with the Spitfires.

Upon starting his professional career in 1949–50, the Red Wings assigned Pronovost to the Omaha Knights of the United States Hockey League (USHL). He appeared in 69 games for the Knights and scored 13 goals and 52 points. Pronovost set a scoring record by a defenceman and was named the USHL's rookie of the year. He was also named to the first All-Star team. At 19 years of age, Pronovost was compared to legendary defenceman Eddie Shore and Detroit coach Jack Adams described him as being "one of those guys who comes around once every 20 years".

=== Detroit Red Wings ===
The Red Wings brought Pronovost to Detroit at the conclusion of his USHL season. Gordie Howe had suffered a serious injury early in Detroit's 1950 Stanley Cup Playoff series against the Toronto Maple Leafs forcing the team to move Red Kelly to forward and insert Pronovost into the lineup at defence. He made his NHL debut on April 6, 1950, in the fifth game of the series. Pronovost appeared in nine playoff games as Detroit eliminated the Maple Leafs then came back from a 3–2 series deficit in the final and defeated the New York Rangers in the final two games of the series to win the Stanley Cup.

The NHL All-Star Game format of the time had the defending champion face a team of the all-stars formed from the remaining teams. The 1950 All-Star Game was played prior to the start of the 1950–51 season and Pronovost played in the contest, a 7–1 victory by Detroit. It was the first of 11 All-Star Games which he would ultimately play. The Red Wings had been promoting Pronovost as their next great defenceman, but he suffered a broken cheekbone and a cracked bone in his ankle in separate incidents during the pre-season. Not wanting to let the team down, he tried to play through the injuries but his performance suffered and by December 1950, the Red Wings demoted him to their American Hockey League (AHL) affiliate, the Indianapolis Capitals. Pronovost scored 32 points in 34 games with Indianapolis before the Red Wings recalled him back to the NHL. Though he played only a half season with the Capitals, he was named an AHL Second Team All-Star on defence. He finished with seven points in 37 games with Detroit and scored his first NHL goal on February 19, 1951, on goaltender Jack Gelineau. It was a last-minute goal that salvaged a 2–2 tie against the Boston Bruins.

The Red Wings again won the Stanley Cup in 1951–52, defeating the Montreal Canadiens in the final. It was Pronovost's first full season in the NHL; he appeared in 69 regular season games and eight more in the playoffs. The Red Wings set a record that post-season by winning all eight games played – four by shutout – and the series spawned the Legend of the Octopus. When an octopus was thrown onto the ice near the end of the clinching game (the eight tentacles meant to represent the eight wins required to win the Stanley Cup at that time), Pronovost was the only player willing to pick it up and remove it. He won his third and fourth Stanley Cup championships in 1953–54 and 1954–55 and played his second and third All-Star Games after each victory. Pronovost's 34 points in 1954–55 were the most of his NHL career. He also played in an ill-fated game in Montreal on March 17, 1955, in which fan anger over the NHL's suspension of Maurice Richard precipitated the Richard Riot. Awarded a forfeit victory in that game, Pronovost and the Red Wings won their final game of the season, also against Montreal, to clinch top spot in the NHL standings for a record seventh consecutive season.

By the 1956–57 season, Pronovost had gained recognition as being one of the NHL's top defencemen. The Red Wings named him an alternate captain of the team, a position he held until 1965. He was named to represent the NHL All-Stars at the 1957 All-Star Game, the first of five consecutive appearances, and was named to the post-season Second All-Star team in both 1958 and 1959. Pronovost scored a career high 11 goals in 1958–59 and was named to the first All-Star team in both 1959–60 and 1960–61. The Canadiens even fêted him by holding "Marcel Pronovost Night" on March 5, 1960, in which he received gifts and was cheered by the opposing Montreal crowd. It was reported as being the first time in NHL history that a team honoured an opposing player.

The Red Wings were unable to duplicate the championship success Pronovost enjoyed in his first six seasons. In 1959, Detroit missed the post-season entirely and Pronovost worked those playoffs as an analyst for Hockey Night in Canada. The team reached, and lost, the Stanley Cup Final to Chicago in 1961. Pronovost suffered a broken bone in his ankle that caused him to miss two games of the series and play the remainder in significant pain. Toronto owner Harold Ballard argued that Detroit would have won the series if Pronovost had been healthy. Detroit also lost in the 1963 and 1964 finals, which marked eight appearances in the final for Pronovost. He is also one of four players in NHL history to play in four game sevens in the Stanley Cup Final.

=== Toronto Maple Leafs ===
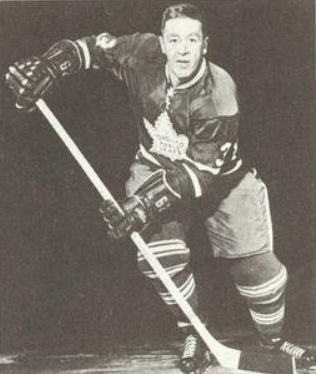
Pronovost in 1965 card for Toronto Maple Leafs

Pronovost's tenure with the Red Wings came to an end on May 20, 1965, as he was involved in an eight-player trade. He was dealt to the Maple Leafs, along with Aut Erickson, Larry Jeffrey, Eddie Joyal and Lowell MacDonald in exchange for Andy Bathgate, Billy Harris and Gary Jarrett. Pronovost, who heard about the trade on the radio before being contacted by either team, was shocked at being dealt away from an organization he played with for 18 years. He adjusted quickly and reached a career milestone early in the 1965–66 season. Pronovost became the seventh player in NHL history to play 1,000 regular season games in a November 28, 1965, contest against the Rangers. He also missed 16 games after suffering strained knee ligaments after colliding with Earl Ingarfield. It was the first of several knee problems that would affect the remainder of Pronovost's career; he also missed games early in the 1966–67 season due to strained knee ligaments.

The 1966–67 Maple Leafs had the oldest roster in the NHL and became known as the "Over the Hill Gang". The team lost ten games in a row at one point, but qualified for the 1967 Stanley Cup playoffs in third place. The Maple Leafs were considered underdogs against both the Chicago Black Hawks in the semi-final and the Canadiens in the final. So much so that organizers at Expo 67 in Montreal built a presentation space for the Stanley Cup in anticipation of victory before the series began. Sports Illustrated writer Pete Axthelm called Pronovost the best defenceman of the Final; he and defensive partner Larry Hillman were on the ice for only one goal against at even strength during the entire post-season. Pronovost also scored a key shorthanded goal in a 4–1 win in the fifth game of the series, and Toronto clinched the Stanley Cup with a 3–1 win at home in game six. It was also his 134th, and ultimately final, playoff game. At the time, only Red Kelly (164) and Gordie Howe (150) had appeared in more.

Pronovost appeared in 70 games for the Maple Leafs in 1967–68 and recorded 20 points, but he was held to only 34 games the following season. He missed the majority of the season to injury, and it was at that time that Maple Leafs president Conn Stafford Smythe suggested Pronovost should be installed as a player-coach of one of Toronto's minor league affiliates. He was offered a position with the Tulsa Oilers of the Central Hockey League (CHL), and though initially reluctant to go, the Oilers organization was able to convince Pronovost and his wife to move to the Oklahoma city. He played and coached for much of the year in Tulsa, but was briefly recalled back to Toronto part way through the 1969–70 NHL season. He recorded one assist in seven games with Toronto, the last of his NHL career.

== Coaching career ==
Supported by Tulsa's general manager Ray Miron, who helped him behind the bench, Pronovost appeared in 53 games for the Oilers in 1969–70 and coached the team to a 35–27–10 record. He ended his playing career after appearing in 17 games for Tulsa in 1970–71, and coached two additional seasons for the Oilers before taking his first major league job. The Chicago Cougars of the newly founded World Hockey Association (WHA) announced Pronovost had signed a two-year contract to become the franchise's first head coach on July 6, 1972. He lasted only one season in Chicago before being fired as the Cougars posted a 26–50–2 record in 1972–73.

Pronovost returned to coaching in 1975 as he was hired mid-season to take over the Hull Festivals of the Quebec Major Junior Hockey League (QMJHL). He remained with Hull, who were renamed the Olympiques, for two seasons before he hired to coach the Buffalo Sabres for the 1977–78 NHL season. Pronovost was reluctant to take the job, and did so only following the encouragement of Hull general manager Norm Baril.

Among the highlights for Pronovost and the Sabres in his first season was Buffalo's first regular season victory in franchise history against the Philadelphia Flyers in Philadelphia, on November 10, 1977. Buffalo had 15 losses and two ties in its previous 17 visits (not counting the 1975 Stanley Cup Final, in which the Sabres won two and lost four). The Sabres finished with a 44–17–19 record and finished second in the Adams Division. They defeated the Rangers in the first round of the playoffs before being eliminated by Philadelphia. However, after the Sabres recorded only eight wins in their first 24 games in 1978–79, the organization fired Pronovost along with general manager Punch Imlach. Pronovost returned to Hull almost immediately, but left the team again in 1979 to become an assistant to head coach Bobby Kromm in Detroit. When Kromm was fired late in the 1979–80 season, general manager Ted Lindsay and Pronovost took over as the team's coaches. Lindsay was the official coach of the team for the final nine games of the season, but Pronovost worked behind the bench as the Red Wings won only two contests and lost seven. Pronovost remained with Detroit as Lindsay's assistant to begin the 1980–81 season, but both were dismissed after Detroit began with a 3–14–3 record.

Returning again to junior hockey, Pronovost was hired as the coach of the Ontario Hockey League's Windsor Spitfires. The team went 22–44–4 in 1981–82, while Pronovost described the following season as being a "disaster". He was given a ten-game suspension for verbally harassing the officials and continuing to coach from the stands after being ejected from a game and was dismissed as Windsor's coach after the team won only two of its first 15 games. Pronovost's final season as a coach came in 1984–85 when he led the junior C Belle River Canadiens to the franchise's first league title and a Clarence Schmalz Cup win as Ontario provincial champions.

== Scouting career ==
Pronovost turned to scouting in 1985 when he joined the NHL Central Scouting Bureau. He already had some experience with the role as one of his duties as coach in Tulsa included searching for talent to improve his team. Pronovost spent five years traveling across North America for the Scouting Bureau. In 1990, he joined the New Jersey Devils as one of the team's scouts. The 2013–14 NHL season was his 24th with the franchise, during which Pronovost has been a member of three Stanley Cup champions, in 1995, 2000 and 2003. New Jersey's goaltender for all three championships was Martin Brodeur, whom Pronovost helped convince the Devils to select with their first pick in the 1990 NHL entry draft.

== Legacy ==
Known as an offensive defenceman at the outset of his NHL career, Pronovost played an aggressive rushing style that led Red Wings fans to call him "Detroit's own Flying Frenchman". He also established a reputation as a physical player who rarely missed time to serious injury. He overcame numerous injuries, including a cracked vertebra suffered in 1954. Among his other injuries, he suffered a broken jaw, broke his wrist twice, separated his shoulder and broke his nose 14 times. By age 32, he had required over 200 stitches to close various cuts and lacerations. Pronovost viewed the injuries as part of the game: "My game is a contact sport. It's a game of men. I expected to get bounced and get my lumps. I also expected to play in every single game."

2012 marked Pronovost's 65th year in professional hockey, tying King Clancy for the longest such tenure by anyone in NHL history., a mark since surpassed by John Bucyk. His name has been inscribed on the Stanley Cup eight times; five as a player and three as a scout. The 53-year span between his first victory in 1950 and most recent in 2003 is a record for the trophy. He published an autobiography in 2012 titled A Life in Hockey that documents his career in the sport.

In 1978, Pronovost was inducted into the Hockey Hall of Fame. He has also been inducted into the Windsor and Essex County Sports Hall of Fame (1995), had his uniform number 4 honoured by the Windsor Spitfires in 2005 and in 2012 was inducted into the Michigan Sports Hall of Fame. The Detroit Red Wings recognized Pronovost's contribution to their organization in 2009 by presenting him with a championship ring from their 2009 title season.

== Personal life ==
Pronovost adopted Windsor as his home having played or worked close to the city for most of his career. He earned a degree in electrical engineering, and during hockey off-seasons drove a truck and did sales for Molson. He met his first wife, Cindy, while playing with her brother on a softball team in Shawinigan. They were married in 1951 and have three children: Michel, Brigitte and Leo. Cindy died of cancer in 1993. Pronovost married his second wife, Eva, in 1994, and he fought his own battle with bladder cancer in 2012. Pronovost died on April 26, 2015, after a brief illness.

== Career statistics ==
=== Regular season and playoffs ===
			Regular season					Playoffs
Season	Team	League	GP	G	A	Pts	PIM	GP	G	A	Pts	PIM
1947–48	Windsor Spitfires	OHA	33	6	18	24	61	12	1	3	4	28
1947–48	Detroit Auto Club	IHL	19	5	3	8	53	—	—	—	—	—
1948–49	Windsor Spitfires	OHA	42	14	23	37	126	4	1	5	6	2
1948–49	Detroit Auto Club	IHL	9	4	4	8	25	6	3	1	4	15
1949–50	Omaha Knights	USHL	69	13	39	52	100	7	4	9	13	9
1949–50	Detroit Red Wings	NHL	—	—	—	—	—	9	0	1	1	10
1950–51	Detroit Red Wings	NHL	37	1	6	7	20	6	0	0	0	0
1950–51	Indianapolis Capitals	AHL	34	9	23	32	44	—	—	—	—	—
1951–52	Detroit Red Wings	NHL	69	7	11	18	50	8	0	1	1	10
1952–53	Detroit Red Wings	NHL	68	8	19	27	72	6	0	0	0	6
1953–54	Detroit Red Wings	NHL	57	6	12	18	50	12	2	3	5	12
1954–55	Detroit Red Wings	NHL	70	9	25	34	90	11	1	2	3	6
1955–56	Detroit Red Wings	NHL	68	4	13	17	46	10	0	2	2	8
1956–57	Detroit Red Wings	NHL	70	7	9	16	38	5	0	0	0	0
1957–58	Detroit Red Wings	NHL	62	2	18	20	52	4	0	1	1	4
1958–59	Detroit Red Wings	NHL	69	11	21	32	44	—	—	—	—	—
1959–60	Detroit Red Wings	NHL	69	7	17	24	38	6	1	1	2	2
1960–61	Detroit Red Wings	NHL	70	6	11	17	44	9	2	3	5	0
1961–62	Detroit Red Wings	NHL	70	4	14	18	38	—	—	—	—	—
1962–63	Detroit Red Wings	NHL	69	4	9	13	48	11	1	4	5	8
1963–64	Detroit Red Wings	NHL	67	3	17	20	42	14	0	2	2	14
1964–65	Detroit Red Wings	NHL	68	1	15	16	45	7	0	3	3	4
1965–66	Toronto Maple Leafs	NHL	54	2	8	10	34	4	0	0	0	6
1966–67	Toronto Maple Leafs	NHL	58	2	12	14	28	12	1	0	1	8
1967–68	Toronto Maple Leafs	NHL	70	3	17	20	48	—	—	—	—	—
1968–69	Toronto Maple Leafs	NHL	34	1	2	3	20	—	—	—	—	—
1969–70	Tulsa Oilers	CHL	53	1	16	17	24	2	0	0	0	0
1969–70	Toronto Maple Leafs	NHL	7	0	1	1	4	—	—	—	—	—
1970–71	Tulsa Oilers	CHL	17	0	0	0	4	—	—	—	—	—
NHL totals			1,206	88	257	345	851	134	8	23	31	104

=== Coaching ===
Season	Team	League	Regular season						Playoffs
Season	Team	League	G	W	L	T	Pct	Division rank	Result
1969–70	Tulsa Oilers	CHL	72	35	27	10	.556	3rd overall	Lost in first round
1970–71	Tulsa Oilers	CHL	72	27	37	8	.431	6th overall	Did not qualify
1971–72	Tulsa Oilers	CHL	72	34	30	8	.528	2nd overall	Lost final
1972–73	Chicago Cougars	WHA	78	26	50	2	.346	6th, West	Did not qualify
1975–76	Hull Festivals	QMJHL	56	23	26	7	.473	4th, West	Lost in first round
1976–77	Hull Olympiques	QMJHL	72	26	37	9	.424	5th, Lebel	Lost in first round
1977–78	Buffalo Sabres	NHL	80	44	19	7	.656	2nd, Adams	Lost Adams Division Final
1978–79	Buffalo Sabres	NHL	24	8	10	6	.458	Fired mid-season	
1978–79	Hull Olympiques	QMJHL	36	4	29	3	.153	5th, Lebel	Did not qualify
1979–80	Hull Olympiques	QMJHL	64	21	33	10	.406	Left mid-season	
1981–82	Windsor Spitfires	OHL	68	22	42	4	.353	6th, Emms	Lost in second round
1982–83	Windsor Spitfires	OHL	15	2	13	0	.133	Fired mid-season	
WHA totals			78	26	50	2	.346		
NHL totals			104	52	29	23	.611		

== Awards and honours ==
Minor professional
Award	Year	Ref.
USHL Rookie of the Year	1949–50	
USHL First Team All-Star	1949–50	
AHL Second Team All-Star	1950–51	

National Hockey League
Award	Year	Ref.
Second team All-Star	1957–58; 1958–59	
First Team All-Star	1959–60; 1961–62	
Played in the NHL All-Star Game	1950, 1954; 1955, 1957; 1958, 1959; 1960, 1961; 1963, 1965; 1968	
Stanley Cup	1950; 1952; 1954; 1955; 1967; *1995; *2000; *2003	

^{*} Stanley cup champion as a scout.

== See also ==
- List of family relations in the NHL

Preceded by Floyd Smith	Head coach of the Buffalo Sabres; 1977–78	Succeeded by Bill Inglis
