= Les Hunt =

Canadian ice hockey player

- Born: April 11, 1937 Schreiber, Ontario, Canada
- Died: November 6, 2013 (aged 76) Thunder Bay, Ontario, Canada
- Height: 5 ft 11 in (180 cm)
- Weight: 180 lb (82 kg; 12 st 12 lb)
- Position: Defence
- Shot: Right
- Played for: Baltimore Clippers; Fort Wayne Komets; Los Angeles Blades; San Diego Gulls; Seattle Americans; Seattle Totems; Thunder Bay Twins; Vancouver Canucks (WHL)
- Playing career: 1957–1971

Leslie Hunt (April 11, 1937 – November 6, 2013) was a Canadian professional ice hockey defenceman who spent the majority of his 14-year career in the Western Hockey League.

== Career ==
Hunt started his career with the Seattle Americans in 1957, and remained with the team when they were renamed the Seattle Totems in 1958. He joined the Los Angeles Blades of the Western Hockey League in 1961. After 24 games, he was traded to the Vancouver Canucks. He led the Canucks in points scored by a defenseman during the 1963-64 season.

He left the Canucks to return to the Seattle Totems in 1965, only to return to the Canucks at the start of the 1966-67 season.

Hunt was selected by the Pittsburgh Penguins during the 1967 NHL Expansion Draft, only to be assigned to the Baltimore Clippers prior to the start of the season. After the 1967-68 season, Hunt split time between the San Diego Gulls and the Fort Wayne Komets before retiring after the 1970-71 season.
