= 1962–63 NHL transactions =

The following is a list of all team-to-team transactions that have occurred in the National Hockey League (NHL) during the 1962–63 NHL season. It lists which team each player has been traded to and for which player(s) or other consideration(s), if applicable.

== Transactions ==
May 30, 1962	To Montreal Canadiens Wayne Hicks	To Chicago Black Hawks Al MacNeil
June, 1962 (exact date unknown)	To Boston Bruins Bob Perreault	To Detroit Red Wings Barry Ashbee; Ed Chadwick
June 5, 1962	To Detroit Red Wings Doug Barkley	To Chicago Black Hawks Len Lunde; John McKenzie
July, 1962 (exact date unknown)	To Boston Bruins cash	To Montreal Canadiens loan of Terry Gray
July, 1962 (exact date unknown)	To Detroit Red Wings cash	To Chicago Black Hawks John Hendrickson
September 13, 1962	To Montreal Canadiens Don Cherry	To Detroit Red Wings cash
October 8, 1962	To Detroit Red Wings Pete Goegan	To New York Rangers Noel Price
November 1, 1962	To Boston Bruins Gary Bergman	To Montreal Canadiens Terry Gray
December 3, 1962	To Boston Bruins Forbes Kennedy	To Detroit Red Wings Andre Pronovost
January 22, 1963^{1}	To Boston Bruins Cecil Hoekstra	To Chicago Black Hawks Al Nicholson
February 6, 1963	To Boston Bruins Dean Prentice	To New York Rangers Don McKenney; Dick Meissner^{2}

Notes

1. Trade voided in January, 1963 (exact date unknown), after Nicholson refused to report to Chicago.
2. Terms of this transaction stipulated that Meissner would report to the Rangers following the 1962–63 season.
