= Don Caley =

Canadian ice hockey player

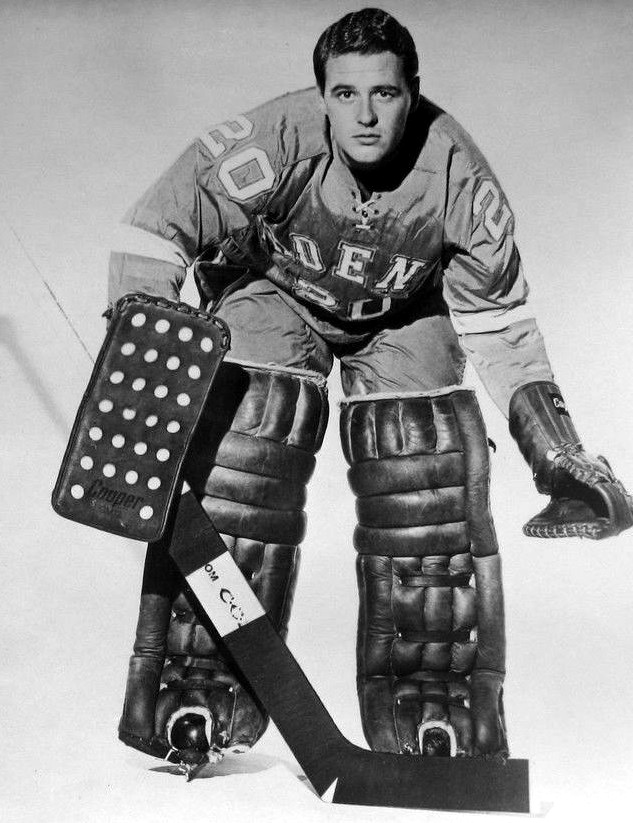
- Caley in 1969
- Born: October 9, 1945; Dauphin, Manitoba, Canada
- Died: January 16, 2016 (aged 70); Phoenix, Arizona, U.S.
- Height: 5 ft 10 in (178 cm)
- Weight: 165 lb (75 kg; 11 st 11 lb)
- Position: Goaltender
- Caught: Left
- Played for: St. Louis Blues
- Playing career: 1966–1974

Donald Thomas Caley (October 9, 1945 – January 16, 2016) was a Canadian professional ice hockey goaltender. He played one game in the National Hockey League with the St. Louis Blues during the 1967–68 season. The rest of his career, which lasted from 1966 to 1974, was spent in the minor leagues.

== Playing career ==
Caley played junior hockey in the Saskatchewan Junior Hockey League for the Weyburn Red Wings for three seasons as well as one game in the Ontario Hockey Association's Junior A division with the Peterborough Petes. On June 6, 1967, Caley was claimed in the 1967 NHL Expansion Draft by the St. Louis Blues and played one game during the 1967–68 season, on December 30, 1967 against the Toronto Maple Leafs. He was traded to the New York Rangers during the off-season but never played for them, instead suiting up for the Omaha Knights as well as one game for the Buffalo Bisons.

On July 3, 1969, Caley was traded to the Western Hockey League's Phoenix Roadrunners where he became their starting goalie. In February 1970, Caley suffered severe whiplash in a car accident and missed the remainder of the season though he recovered in time for the next season. He retired after the 1972–73 season to become a dentist but returned the next season, feeling he could do both jobs at once, but retired for good after seven games and spent the remainder of his life in sales.

Caley died in Phoenix, Arizona in 2016.

== Career statistics ==
=== Regular season and playoffs ===
| | | | Regular season | | | | | | | | | Playoffs |
| Season | Team | League | GP | W | L | T | MIN | GA | SO | GAA | SV% | GP | W | L | MIN | GA | SO | GAA | SV% |
|---|---|---|---|---|---|---|---|---|---|---|---|---|---|---|---|---|---|---|---|
| 1963–64 | Weyburn Red Wings | SJHL | 18 | — | — | — | 1080 | 75 | 0 | 4.16 | — | 5 | 1 | 4 | 300 | 29 | 0 | 5.80 | — |
| 1964–65 | Weyburn Red Wings | SJHL | 54 | 36 | 15 | 3 | 3240 | 188 | 2 | 3.49 | — | 15 | — | — | 900 | 45 | 1 | 3.00 | — |
| 1964–65 | Peterborough T.P.T's | OHA | 1 | 1 | 0 | 0 | 60 | 1 | 0 | 1.00 | — | — | — | — | — | — | — | — | — |
| 1965–66 | Weyburn Red Wings | SJHL | 56 | 36 | 14 | 6 | 3360 | 165 | 4 | 2.95 | — | 12 | — | — | 720 | 29 | 1 | 2.42 | — |
| 1965–66 | Estevan Bruins | M-Cup | — | — | — | — | — | — | — | — | — | 11 | 5 | 6 | 680 | 39 | 0 | 3.44 | — |
| 1966–67 | Pittsburgh Hornets | AHL | 20 | 6 | 11 | 2 | 1122 | 71 | 2 | 3.80 | — | — | — | — | — | — | — | — | — |
| 1967–68 | St. Louis Blues | NHL | 1 | 0 | 0 | 0 | 30 | 3 | 0 | 6.00 | .864 | — | — | — | — | — | — | — | — |
| 1967–68 | Kansas City Blues | CHL | 55 | 26 | 23 | 5 | 3203 | 176 | 1 | 3.30 | — | — | — | — | — | — | — | — | — |
| 1968–69 | Buffalo Bisons | AHL | 1 | 0 | 1 | 0 | 60 | 5 | 0 | 5.00 | — | — | — | — | — | — | — | — | — |
| 1968–69 | Omaha Knights | CHL | 34 | — | — | — | 1899 | 102 | 1 | 3.23 | — | 6 | 3 | 3 | 316 | 14 | 1 | 2.66 | — |
| 1969–70 | Phoenix Roadrunners | WHL | 28 | 8 | 11 | 7 | 1578 | 83 | 0 | 3.16 | — | — | — | — | — | — | — | — | — |
| 1970–71 | Phoenix Roadrunners | WHL | 24 | 9 | 9 | 3 | 1306 | 67 | 2 | 3.08 | — | 4 | 2 | 2 | 207 | 10 | 0 | 2.90 | — |
| 1971–72 | Phoenix Roadrunners | WHL | 44 | 21 | 16 | 2 | 2425 | 129 | 2 | 3.19 | — | 3 | 1 | 2 | 199 | 13 | 0 | 3.91 | — |
| 1972–73 | Phoenix Roadrunners | WHL | 39 | 19 | 11 | 7 | 2236 | 128 | 2 | 3.43 | — | 8 | 7 | 1 | 435 | 23 | 1 | 3.17 | — |
| 1973–74 | Phoenix Roadrunners | WHL | 7 | 4 | 3 | 0 | 427 | 26 | 0 | 3.68 | — | — | — | — | — | — | — | — | — |
| NHL totals | | | 1 | 0 | 0 | 0 | 30 | 3 | 0 | 6.00 | .864 | — | — | — | — | — | — | — | — |

== See also ==
- List of players who played only one game in the NHL
