= 1971–72 Nationalliga A season =

Swiss professional ice hockey season

The 1971–72 Nationalliga A season was the 34th season of the Nationalliga A, the top level of ice hockey in Switzerland. Eight teams participated in the league, and HC La Chaux-de-Fonds won the championship.

== First round ==
Pl.	Team	GP	W	T	L	GF–GA	Pts
1.	HC La Chaux-de-Fonds	14	12	1	1	99:30	25
2.	HC Lugano	14	9	0	5	56:44	18
3.	EHC Kloten	14	8	0	6	76:58	16
4.	HC Servette Genève	14	8	0	6	55:40	16
5.	SC Langnau	14	8	0	6	55:66	16
6.	HC Ambrì-Piotta	14	7	1	6	58:51	15
7.	EHC Visp	14	3	0	11	36:73	6
8.	HC Sierre	14	0	0	14	31:104	0

== Final round ==
Pl.	Team	GP	W	T	L	GF–GA	Pts (B)
1.	HC La Chaux-de-Fonds	8	7	0	1	49:21	17(3)
2.	EHC Kloten	8	4	1	3	47:36	10(1)
3.	HC Servette Genève	8	4	1	3	43:37	9(0)
4.	HC Lugano	8	2	0	6	30:45	6(2)
5.	SC Langnau	8	2	0	6	28:58	4(0)

== Relegation ==
Pl.	Team	GP	W	T	L	GF–GA	Pts (B)
1.	HC Ambrì-Piotta	8	4	3	1	36:24	13(2)
2.	HC Sierre	8	4	1	3	33:32	9(0)
3.	EHC Visp	8	1	2	5	19:32	5(1)
