= 1962–63 NHL season =

National Hockey League season

- League: National Hockey League
- Sport: Ice hockey
- Duration: October 10, 1962 – April 18, 1963
- Games: 70
- Teams: 6
- TV partner(s): CBC, SRC (Canada); None (United States)

Regular season
- Season champion: Toronto Maple Leafs
- Season MVP: Gordie Howe (Red Wings)
- Top scorer: Gordie Howe (Red Wings)

Stanley Cup
- Champions: Toronto Maple Leafs
- Runners-up: Detroit Red Wings

NHL seasons
- ← 1961–62 1963–64 →

The 1962–63 NHL season was the 46th season of the National Hockey League. Six teams played 70 games each. The Toronto Maple Leafs won their second Stanley Cup in a row as they defeated the Detroit Red Wings four games to one. As of 2025, this is the latest season the Leafs had most points in the regular season.

== Regular season ==
Some diversionary news hit the sports pages the day of the All-Star Game when it was reported that Toronto had sold Frank Mahovlich to Chicago for $1 million and James D. Norris produced a cheque for the amount. On the advice of Conn Smythe, Leafs general manager and head coach Punch Imlach declined the deal, saying that a million dollars does not score goals, and Mahovlich would remain a Maple Leaf.

A serious incident took place on October 23 between the Montreal Canadiens and Chicago Black Hawks. A vicious stick-swinging duel took place between Gilles Tremblay and Reg Fleming that was said to be the worst since the Bernie Geoffrion–Ron Murphy fight in 1953. Both players received match penalties and $100 fines. Tremblay emerged with a bad cut on his head that required many stitches. Montreal coach Toe Blake had some caustic remarks for Fleming when he was leaving the ice, which almost resulted in another fight. The Canadiens and Black Hawks played to a 4–4 tie. President Clarence Campbell suspended both Tremblay and Fleming for three games.

Glenn Hall's consecutive game streak came to an end on November 8 when he suffered a pinched nerve in his back and he was relieved by Denis DeJordy in the first period of a game in which Hall's Black Hawks tied Boston 3–3. DeJordy played well in the next game as the Black Hawks beat the Canadiens 3–1.

Chicago was improving and moved into a first-place tie with Detroit when they blanked Boston 5–0 on November 29. Stan Mikita scored two goals and Bobby Hull had one. The same night, the Rangers shut out the Red Wings 5–0 as Gump Worsley played a fine game. Worsley was unlucky in his next game, however, as Chicago beat the Rangers 5–1. Worsley badly injured his shoulder and had to be replaced by Marcel Pelletier. Gump went to the hospital where he would have his shoulder in traction for ten days.

Andy Hebenton had the hat trick on December 16 as the Rangers beat Detroit 5–2 at Madison Square Garden. The game was spoiled by a brawl, the chief participants being Dave Balon, Bill Gadsby, Doug Barkley and Terry Sawchuk. All were fined.

Andy Bathgate got both goals when the Rangers tied Montreal 2–2 at the Montreal Forum on January 5. This was the tenth consecutive game in which he had scored. The streak was terminated when Jacques Plante blanked the Rangers 6–0 in New York.

Jean Beliveau scored his 300th NHL goal on January 26 when the Rangers beat the Canadiens 4–2 at the Forum. Goals had not come very fast this year, and he hinted that this might be his last season. The writers did not take him seriously, however. The next night, the Canadiens beat the Black Hawks 3–1 at Chicago Stadium and Beliveau scored a spectacular goal, giving a beautiful exhibition of stick-handling.

Bernie Geoffrion and Don Marshall were back on January 31, but the Canadiens lost 6–3 to Toronto at the Forum. Coach Toe Blake was not pleased with the officiating and was quoted in a French newspaper that referee Eddie Powers handled the game as if he had bet on the outcome. This attracted the attention of NHL president Clarence Campbell, who said the matter would be investigated. Later, Blake was fined $200 by Campbell. Powers considered the fine inadequate and submitted his resignation as a referee. He cited Red Storey when Campbell would not support decisions he made. Powers then sued Blake for libel.

Bobby Hull scored all three goals as Chicago beat Boston 3–1 on February 17. On the same night, Montreal beat Detroit 6–1 and Howie Young established a penalty record when he high-sticked a Canadiens player and then commenced a tantrum, which drew him a minor, a major, a misconduct and a game misconduct totalling 27 minutes. His season total was now 208 minutes in penalties. NHL president Campbell then tacked on a three-game suspension.

Detroit ousted the Rangers from the playoffs on March 3 with a 3–2 win.

Bernie Geoffrion was in trouble for an incident during a game on March 5 in which Montreal beat Detroit 4–3. Referee Vern Buffey had given Jacques Plante a penalty for slashing Howie Young and then a bench penalty when the Canadiens protested. Geoffrion threw his stick at Buffey and his gloves as well. Geoffrion was given a match penalty and President Campbell assessed Geoffrion a five-game suspension.

The career of the Canadiens' Lou Fontinato came to a tragic end on March 9 when he tried to check Vic Hadfield and instead was thrown headlong into the boards by the Ranger player. Fontinato lay motionless on the ice for some time before being carried off the ice on a stretcher and taken to Montreal General Hospital where the diagnosis was a fractured neck, a crushed cervical vertebra. He gradually recovered from his paralyzed condition, but would never play hockey again. Jacques Laperriere replaced Fontinato on the Canadiens defence.

It was quite a race for playoff positions, as five points separated fourth and first. Gordie Howe led the Red Wings and the NHL as he won his sixth and last Art Ross Trophy and Hart Trophy.

=== Final standings ===
National Hockey League
		GP	W	L	T	GF	GA	DIFF	Pts
1	Toronto Maple Leafs	70	35	23	12	221	180	+41	82
2	Chicago Black Hawks	70	32	21	17	194	178	+16	81
3	Montreal Canadiens	70	28	19	23	225	183	+42	79
4	Detroit Red Wings	70	32	25	13	200	194	+6	77
5	New York Rangers	70	22	36	12	211	233	−22	56
6	Boston Bruins	70	14	39	17	198	281	−83	45

== Playoffs ==
=== Playoff bracket ===
The top four teams in the league qualified for the playoffs. In the semifinals, the first-place team played the third-place team, while the second-place team faced the fourth-place team, with the winners advancing to the Stanley Cup Finals. In both rounds, teams competed in a best-of-seven series (scores in the bracket indicate the number of games won in each best-of-seven series).

Semifinals
1	Toronto	4
3	Montreal	1
2	Chicago	2
4	Detroit	4

Stanley Cup Finals
1	Toronto	4
4	Detroit	1

=== Semifinals ===
==== (1) Toronto Maple Leafs vs. (3) Montreal Canadiens ====
March 26	Montreal Canadiens	1–3	Toronto Maple Leafs	Maple Leaf Gardens	Recap
No scoring		First period	03:30 – Bob Pulford (1)
Jean Beliveau (1) – pp – 08:46		Second period	01:42 – Dick Duff (1); 05:35 – pp – George Armstrong (1)
No scoring		Third period	No scoring
Jacques Plante 31 saves / 34 shots		Goalie stats	Johnny Bower 19 saves / 20 shots

March 28	Montreal Canadiens	2–3	Toronto Maple Leafs	Maple Leaf Gardens	Recap
Jean Beliveau (2) – 06:07		First period	06:54 – George Armstrong (2)
Terry Harper (1) – 06:14		Second period	03:15 – Allan Stanley (1); 16:35 – Dave Keon (1)
No scoring		Third period	No scoring
Jacques Plante 24 saves / 27 shots		Goalie stats	Johnny Bower 29 saves / 31 shots

March 30	Toronto Maple Leafs	2–0	Montreal Canadiens	Montreal Forum	Recap
No scoring		First period	No scoring
Eddie Shack (1) – 13:14		Second period	No scoring
Bob Pulford (2) – 14:16		Third period	No scoring
Johnny Bower 32 saves / 32 shots		Goalie stats	Jacques Plante 20 saves / 22 shots

April 2	Toronto Maple Leafs	1–3	Montreal Canadiens	Montreal Forum	Recap
Ron Stewart (1) – 06:12		First period	No scoring
No scoring		Second period	00:26 – Henri Richard (1); 14:00 – pp – Gilles Tremblay (1)
No scoring		Third period	05:29 – pp – Gilles Tremblay (2)
Johnny Bower 37 saves / 40 shots		Goalie stats	Jacques Plante 23 saves / 24 shots

April 4	Montreal Canadiens	0–5	Toronto Maple Leafs	Maple Leaf Gardens	Recap
No scoring		First period	06:56 – pp – Dave Keon (2); 09:43 – Dick Duff (2); 10:11 – Ron Stewart (2)
No scoring		Second period	16:37 – Dave Keon (3)
No scoring		Third period	11:27 – Kent Douglas (1)
Jacques Plante 27 saves / 32 shots		Goalie stats	Johnny Bower 35 saves / 35 shots

Toronto won series 4–1

==== (2) Chicago Black Hawks vs. (4) Detroit Red Wings ====
March 26	Detroit Red Wings	4–5	Chicago Black Hawks	Chicago Stadium	Recap
Marcel Pronovost (1) – 13:37		First period	09:08 – Bobby Hull (1); 15:02 – pp – Bobby Hull (2)
Vic Stasiuk (1) – 09:50		Second period	08:19 – pp – Ab McDonald (1); 12:50 – Eric Nesterenko (1); 16:46 – Bill Hay (1)
Alex Delvecchio (1) – 01:18; Gordie Howe (1) – 03:05		Third period	No scoring
Terry Sawchuck 31 saves / 36 shots		Goalie stats	Glenn Hall 29 saves / 33 shots

March 28	Detroit Red Wings	2–5	Chicago Black Hawks	Chicago Stadium	Recap
Vic Stasiuk (2) – 10:54		First period	12:58 – pp – Bobby Hull
No scoring		Second period	06:24 – Bill Hay (2); 16:45 – pp – Bill Hay (3)
Gordie Howe (2) – 10:51		Third period	01:56 – pp – Stan Mikita (1); 07:43 – pp – Ab McDonald (2)
Terry Sawchuck		Goalie stats	Glenn Hall

March 31	Chicago Black Hawks	2–4	Detroit Red Wings	Olympia Stadium	Recap
Stan Mikita (2) – pp – 04:31		First period	No scoring
Stan Mikita (3) – 17:33		Second period	10:36 – Gordie Howe (3); 19:40 – pp – Parker MacDonald (1)
No scoring		Third period	06:02 – Alex Faulkner (1); 06:43 – Bruce MacGregor (1)
Glenn Hall 27 saves / 29 shots		Goalie stats	Terry Sawchuck 35 saves / 40 shots

April 2	Chicago Black Hawks	1–4	Detroit Red Wings	Olympia Stadium	Recap
No scoring		First period	12:34 – pp – Alex Faulkner (2)
Bobby Hull (4) – pp – 08:37		Second period	01:11 – pp – Gordie Howe (4); 18:20 – Andre Pronovost (1)
No scoring		Third period	00:18 – Floyd Smith (1)
Glenn Hall 35 saves / 39 shots		Goalie stats	Terry Sawchuck 17 saves / 18 shots

April 4	Detroit Red Wings	4–2	Chicago Black Hawks	Chicago Stadium	Recap
Floyd Smith (2) – 15:51		First period	No scoring
Norm Ullman (1) – 04:53; Parker MacDonald (2) – pp – 19:05		Second period	08:32 – Kenny Wharram (1); 15:17 – Bobby Hull (5)
Norm Ullman (2) – pp – 17:25		Third period	No scoring
Terry Sawchuck 30 saves / 32 shots		Goalie stats	Glenn Hall 43 saves / 47 shots

April 7	Chicago Black Hawks	4–7	Detroit Red Wings	Olympia Stadium	Recap
Bobby Hull (6) – 07:35		First period	05:43 – Parker MacDonald (3); 16:49 – pp – Norm Ullman (3)
Bobby Hull (7) – 03:53; Bobby Hull (8) – 14:34; Eric Nesterenko (2) – 17:43		Second period	04:12 – Larry Jeffrey (1); 05:01 – Alex Delvecchio (2)
No scoring		Third period	07:09 – Alex Faulkner (3); 10:46 – pp – Norm Ullman (4); 16:29 – Bill Gadsby (1)
Glenn Hall 38 saves / 45 shots		Goalie stats	Terry Sawchuck 20 saves / 24 shots

Detroit won series 4–2

=== Stanley Cup Finals ===
April 9	Detroit Red Wings	2–4	Toronto Maple Leafs	Maple Leaf Gardens	Recap
No scoring		First period	00:49 – Dick Duff (3); 01:08 – Dick Duff (4); 14:42 – sh – Bob Nevin (1)
Larry Jeffrey (2) – 05:36; Larry Jeffrey (3) – pp – 08:05		Second period	No scoring
No scoring		Third period	05:08 – Bob Nevin (2)
Terry Sawchuck 23 saves / 27 shots		Goalie stats	Johnny Bower 30 saves / 32 shots

April 11	Detroit Red Wings	2–4	Toronto Maple Leafs	Maple Leaf Gardens	Recap
No scoring		First period	05:31 – Ed Litzenberger (1); 18:42 – Ron Stewart (3)
Gordie Howe (5) – 01:32		Second period	00:49 – Bob Nevin (3); 08:55 – pp – Ron Stewart (4)
Gordie Howe (6) – 02:03		Third period	No scoring
Terry Sawchuck 33 saves / 37 shots		Goalie stats	Johnny Bower 25 saves / 27 shots

April 14	Toronto Maple Leafs	2–3	Detroit Red Wings	Olympia Stadium	Recap
Dave Keon (4) – 14:56		First period	00:33 – Vic Stasiuk (3)
Tim Horton (1) – 13:06		Second period	08:13 – Alex Faulkner (4); 13:39 – Alex Faulkner (5)
No scoring		Third period	No scoring
Johnny Bower 28 saves / 31 shots		Goalie stats	Terry Sawchuck 30 saves / 32 shots

April 16	Toronto Maple Leafs	4–2	Detroit Red Wings	Olympia Stadium	Recap
No scoring		First period	02:54 – Gordie Howe (7)
George Armstrong (3) – 01:17; Red Kelly (1) – 17:41		Second period	02:38 – pp – Eddie Joyal (1)
Dave Keon (5) – 09:42; Red Kelly (2) – pp – 17:45		Third period	No scoring
Johnny Bower 38 saves / 40 shots		Goalie stats	Terry Sawchuck 29 saves / 33 shots

April 18	Detroit Red Wings	1–3	Toronto Maple Leafs	Maple Leaf Gardens	Recap
No scoring		First period	17:44 – sh – Dave Keon (6)
Alex Delvecchio (3) – 00:49		Second period	No scoring
No scoring		Third period	13:28 – Eddie Shack (2); 19:55 – sh – en – Dave Keon (7)
Terry Sawchuck 25 saves / 27 shots		Goalie stats	Johnny Bower 26 saves / 27 shots

Toronto won series 4–1

== Awards ==
1962–63 NHL awards
Prince of Wales Trophy: (Regular season champion)	Toronto Maple Leafs
Art Ross Trophy: (Top scorer)	Gordie Howe, Detroit Red Wings
Calder Memorial Trophy: (Best first-year player)	Kent Douglas, Toronto Maple Leafs
Hart Memorial Trophy: (Most valuable player)	Gordie Howe, Detroit Red Wings
James Norris Memorial Trophy: (Best defenceman)	Pierre Pilote, Chicago Black Hawks
Lady Byng Memorial Trophy: (Excellence and sportsmanship)	Dave Keon, Toronto Maple Leafs
Vezina Trophy: (Goaltender of team with the best goals-against average)	Glenn Hall, Chicago Black Hawks

=== All-Star teams ===
First team	Position	Second team
Glenn Hall, Chicago Black Hawks	G	Terry Sawchuk, Detroit Red Wings
Pierre Pilote, Chicago Black Hawks	D	Tim Horton, Toronto Maple Leafs
Carl Brewer, Toronto Maple Leafs	D	Moose Vasko, Chicago Black Hawks
Stan Mikita, Chicago Black Hawks	C	Henri Richard, Montreal Canadiens
Gordie Howe, Detroit Red Wings	RW	Andy Bathgate, New York Rangers
Frank Mahovlich, Toronto Maple Leafs	LW	Bobby Hull, Chicago Black Hawks

== Player statistics ==
=== Scoring leaders ===
Note: GP = Games played, G = Goals, A = Assists, Pts = Points, PIM = Penalties in minutes

Player	Team	GP	G	A	Pts	PIM
Gordie Howe	Detroit Red Wings	70	38	48	86	100
Andy Bathgate	New York Rangers	70	35	46	81	54
Stan Mikita	Chicago Black Hawks	65	31	45	76	69
Frank Mahovlich	Toronto Maple Leafs	67	36	37	73	56
Henri Richard	Montreal Canadiens	67	23	50	73	57
Jean Beliveau	Montreal Canadiens	69	18	49	67	68
John Bucyk	Boston Bruins	69	27	39	66	36
Alex Delvecchio	Detroit Red Wings	70	20	44	64	8
Bobby Hull	Chicago Black Hawks	65	31	31	62	27
Murray Oliver	Boston Bruins	65	22	40	62	38

=== Leading goaltenders ===
Note: GP = Games played; Min – Minutes played; GA = Goals against; GAA = Goals against average; W = Wins; L = Losses; T = Ties; SO = Shutouts

Player	Team	GP	MIN	GA	GAA	W	L	T	SO
Jacques Plante	Montreal Canadiens	56	3320	138	2.49	22	14	19	5
Don Simmons	Toronto Maple Leafs	28	1680	70	2.50	15	8	5	1
Glenn Hall	Chicago Black Hawks	66	3910	166	2.52	30	20	15	5
Terry Sawchuk	Detroit Red Wings	48	2781	117	2.52	21	17	7	3
Johnny Bower	Toronto Maple Leafs	42	2520	109	2.60	20	15	7	1
Hank Bassen	Detroit Red Wings	16	960	52	3.25	6	5	5	0
Gump Worsley	New York Rangers	67	3980	217	3.27	22	34	10	2
Bob Perreault	Boston Bruins	22	1320	82	3.73	3	12	7	1
Eddie Johnston	Boston Bruins	50	2880	193	4.02	11	27	10	1

== Coaches ==
- Boston Bruins: Milt Schmidt
- Chicago Black Hawks: Rudy Pilous
- Detroit Red Wings: Sid Abel
- Montreal Canadiens: Toe Blake
- New York Rangers: Muzz Patrick and Red Sullivan
- Toronto Maple Leafs: Punch Imlach

== Debuts ==
The following is a list of players of note who played their first NHL game in 1962–63 (listed with their first team, asterisk(*) marks debut in playoffs):

- Eddie Johnston, Boston Bruins
- Paul Henderson, Detroit Red Wings
- Claude Larose, Montreal Canadiens
- Jacques Laperriere, Montreal Canadiens
- Terry Harper, Montreal Canadiens
- Jim Neilson, New York Rangers
- Kent Douglas, Toronto Maple Leafs

== Last games ==
The following is a list of players of note who played their last game in the NHL in 1962–63 (listed with their last team):

- Bob Turner, Chicago Black Hawks
- Jack Evans, Chicago Black Hawks
- Vic Stasiuk, Detroit Red Wings
- Lou Fontinato, Montreal Canadiens

== Broadcasting ==
Hockey Night in Canada on CBC Television televised Saturday night regular season games and Stanley Cup playoff games. Games were not broadcast in their entirety until the 1968–69 season, and were typically joined in progress, while the radio version of HNIC aired games in their entirety.

This was the third consecutive season that the NHL did not have an American national broadcaster until the 1965–66 season.

== See also ==
- 1962–63 NHL transactions
- List of Stanley Cup champions
- National Hockey League All-Star Game
- 1962 in sports
- 1963 in sports
