= Gary Jarrett =

Canadian ice hockey player

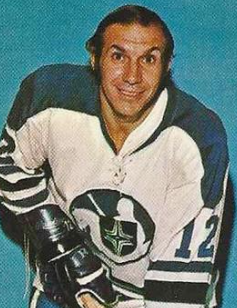
- Jarrett in 1972–73
- Born: September 3, 1942 (age 84) Toronto, Ontario, Canada
- Height: 5 ft 8 in (173 cm)
- Weight: 170 lb (77 kg; 12 st 2 lb)
- Position: Left wing
- Shot: Left
- Played for: Toronto Maple Leafs; Detroit Red Wings; California Golden Seals
- Playing career: 1959–1976

Gary Walter Jarrett (born September 3, 1942) is a Canadian former professional ice hockey forward. He played for the Toronto Maple Leafs, Detroit Red Wings, and Oakland Seals/California Golden Seals between 1960 and 1972, and then spent four seasons in the WHA with the Cleveland Crusaders before retiring after the 1976 season.

== Career statistics ==
=== Regular season and playoffs ===
			Regular season					Playoffs
Season	Team	League	GP	G	A	Pts	PIM	GP	G	A	Pts	PIM
1959–60	Toronto Marlboros	OHA	48	24	28	52	12	4	1	3	4	14
1960–61	Toronto Marlboros	OHA	46	30	20	50	90	—	—	—	—	—
1960–61	Sudbury Wolves	EPHL	1	0	0	0	0	—	—	—	—	—
1960–61	Toronto Maple Leafs	NHL	1	0	0	0	0	—	—	—	—	—
1960–61	Rochester Americans	AHL	6	0	0	0	2	—	—	—	—	—
1961–62	Toronto Marlboros	OHA	31	28	27	55	80	12	11	15	26	41
1961–62	Rochester Americans	AHL	5	3	1	4	6	—	—	—	—	—
1962–63	Sudbury Wolves	EPHL	21	13	14	27	14	—	—	—	—	—
1962–63	Rochester Americans	AHL	47	6	22	28	19	2	1	3	4	0
1963–64	Denver Invaders	WHL	64	22	35	57	37	6	2	0	2	6
1963–64	Rochester Americans	AHL	5	0	1	1	0	—	—	—	—	—
1964–65	Tulsa Oilers	CHL	67	27	29	56	60	12	8	5	13	10
1965–66	Pittsburgh Hornets	AHL	71	24	26	50	30	3	1	0	1	4
1966–67	Detroit Red Wings	NHL	4	0	0	0	0	—	—	—	—	—
1966–67	Pittsburgh Hornets	AHL	68	29	42	71	28	9	6	3	9	11
1967–68	Detroit Red Wings	NHL	68	18	21	39	20	—	—	—	—	—
1968–69	Oakland Seals	NHL	63	22	23	45	22	7	2	1	3	4
1969–70	Oakland Seals	NHL	75	12	19	31	31	4	1	0	1	5
1970–71	California Golden Seals	NHL	75	15	19	34	40	—	—	—	—	—
1971–72	California Golden Seals	NHL	55	5	10	15	18	—	—	—	—	—
1972–73	Cleveland Crusaders	WHA	77	40	38	78	79	9	8	3	11	19
1973–74	Cleveland Crusaders	WHA	75	31	39	70	68	5	1	1	2	13
1974–75	Cleveland Crusaders	WHA	77	17	24	41	70	5	0	1	1	0
1975–76	Cleveland Crusaders	WHA	69	16	17	33	22	3	0	3	3	2
WHA totals			298	104	118	222	239	22	9	8	17	34
NHL totals			341	72	92	164	131	11	3	1	4	9
